= Project Indy =

CART and Indy Racing league team

Project Indy was a car racing team owned by Andreas Leberle that competed in the CART Championship Car series and the Indy Racing League IndyCar Series. Leberle was a former chief mechanic for Euromotorsport, and like Euromotorsport, Project Indy's cars were often driven by pay drivers. The team was founded in 1994 and operated through the 1998 CART season. Their only appearance in the IRL was with Johnny Unser for two of the three races of the 1996 season and the two 1996 races of the 1996–1997 season, which were competed with CART-spec equipment. The best race finish registered by a Project Indy driver was 7th place by Christian Danner in the 1995 Marlboro Grand Prix of Miami. In 1998 the team was known as Project CART due to not being allowed to use the Indianapolis Motor Speedway's "Indy" trademark as the team by then only participated in CART.

The team attempted the Indianapolis 500 several times but only succeeded in making the field in 1996 with Unser; their car did not start due to a broken transmission.

== Drivers ==
=== CART ===
- (Germany) Christian Danner (1994–1995)
- (France) Franck Fréon (1994–1995)
- (United States) Buddy Lazier (1995)
- (Germany) Arnd Meier (1997)
- (Italy) Andrea Montermini (1994)
- (Brazil) Roberto Moreno (1998)
- (Italy) Domenico Schiattarella (1994–1995, 1998)
- (Austria) Hubert Stromberger (1995)
- (United States) Dennis Vitolo (1996–1997)

=== IRL ===
- (United States) Johnny Unser (1996)

== Racing results ==
=== Complete CART FedEx Championship Series results ===
(key)

Year	Chassis	Engine	Tyres	Drivers	No.	1	2	3	4	5	6	7	8	9	10	11	12	13	14	15	16	17	18	19
1994						SFR	PHX	LBH	INDY	MIL	DET	POR	CLE	TOR	MCH	MDO	NHA	VAN	ROA	NAZ	LAG			
1994	Lola T93/06	Ford XB V8t	G	(France) Franck Fréon	64			12				15												
1994	Lola T93/06	Ford XB V8t	G	(Belgium) Didier Theys	64				DNQ															
1994	Lola T93/06	Ford XB V8t	G	(Germany) Christian Danner	64						12		Wth						12					
1994	Lola T93/06	Ford XB V8t	G	(Italy) Domenico Schiattarella	64									26		16		Wth						
1994	Lola T93/06	Ford XB V8t	G	(Italy) Andrea Montermini	64																9			
1995						MIA	SFR	PHX	LBH	NAZ	INDY	MIL	DET	POR	ROA	TOR	CLE	MCH	MDO	NHA	VAN	LAG		
1995	Lola T93/06; Reynard 94i	Ford XB V8t	G	(Germany) Christian Danner	64	7							22											
1995	Reynard 94i	Ford XB V8t	G	(United States) Buddy Lazier	64		21									15								
1995	Reynard 94i	Ford XB V8t	G	(France) Franck Fréon	64				15															
1995	Reynard 94i	Ford XB V8t	G	(United States) Johnny Parsons, Jr.	64						DNQ													
1995	Reynard 94i	Ford XB V8t	G	(Austria) Hubert Stromberger	64										16		Wth		DNQ					
1995	Reynard 94i	Ford XB V8t	G	(Italy) Domenico Schiattarella	64																18	21		
1996						MIA	RIO	SFR	LBH	NAZ	500	MIL	DET	POR	CLE	TOR	MCH	MDO	ROA	VAN	LAG			
1996	Reynard 95i	Ford XB V8t	G	(United States) Dennis Vitolo	64				17															
1997						MIA	SFR	LBH	NAZ	RIO	GAT	MIL	DET	POR	CLE	TOR	MCH	MDO	ROA	VAN	LAG	FON		
1997	Lola T97/00	Ford XD V8t	G	(United States) Dennis Vitolo	64	23		Wth	DNS											27	20			
1997	Lola T97/00	Ford XD V8t	G	(Germany) Arnd Meier	64		16			25	DNS		18	18	22	24	12	16	19			25		
1998						MIA	MOT	LBH	NAZ	RIO	GAT	MIL	DET	POR	CLE	TOR	MCH	MDO	ROA	VAN	LAG	HOU	SFR	FON
1998	Reynard 97i	Mercedes-Benz IC108D V8t	G	(Brazil) Roberto Moreno	15	15	26																	
1998	Reynard 97i	Mercedes-Benz IC108D V8t	G	(Italy) Domenico Schiattarella	15			16																

=== Complete Indy Racing League results ===
(key)

Year	Chassis	Engine	Tyres	Drivers	No.	1	2	3	4	5	6	7	8	9	10
1996						WDW	PHX	INDY							
1996	Reynard 94i Reynard 95i	Ford XB V8t	G	(United States) Johnny Unser	64		9	33							
1996	Lola T93/00	Ford XB V8t	G	(New Zealand) Rob Wilson	46			DNQ							
1996–1997						NHA	LSV	WDW	PHX	INDY	TXS	PPIR	CLT	NHA2	LSV2
1996–1997	Reynard 95i	Ford XB V8t	G	(United States) Johnny Unser	64	DNQ	22								
