= 1998 Honda Indy 300 =

Coordinates: 27°59′17.9″S 153°25′42.1″E

(Australia) 1998 Honda Indy 300
Race details
- Race 18 of 19 in the 1998 CART season
- Map of the track
- Date: 18 October, 1998
- Official name: Honda Indy 300
- Location: Surfers Paradise Street Circuit; Queensland, Australia
- Course: Temporary Street Circuit; 2.795 mi / 4.498 km
- Distance: 62 laps 173.290 mi / 278.876 km
- Weather: Dry

Pole position
- Driver: (United Kingdom) Dario Franchitti (Team KOOL Green)
- Time: 1:32.288

Fastest lap
- Driver: (Italy) Alex Zanardi (Chip Ganassi Racing)
- Time: 1:33.780 (on lap 54 of 62)

Podium
- First: (Italy) Alex Zanardi (Chip Ganassi Racing)
- Second: (United Kingdom) Dario Franchitti (Team KOOL Green)
- Third: (Brazil) Christian Fittipaldi (Newman-Haas Racing)

The 1998 Honda Indy 300 was the eighteenth and penultimate round of the 1998 CART World Series Season, held on 18 October 1998 on the Surfers Paradise Street Circuit, Surfers Paradise, Queensland, Australia. Alex Zanardi won the race, his 15th and final CART victory, after taking the lead from polesitter Dario Franchitti at the first round of pitstops.

== Qualifying results ==
Pos	Nat	Name	Team	Chassis	Time
1	(United Kingdom)	Dario Franchitti	Team Green	Reynard 98i Honda	1:32.288
2	(Italy)	Alex Zanardi	Chip Ganassi Racing	Reynard 98i Honda	1:32.310
3	(Brazil)	Christian Fittipaldi	Newman-Haas Racing	Swift 009.c Ford-Cosworth	1:32.501
4	(Canada)	Paul Tracy	Team Green	Reynard 98i Honda	1:32.583
5	(United States)	Bryan Herta	Team Rahal	Reynard 98i Ford-Cosworth	1:32.588
6	(United States)	Michael Andretti	Newman-Haas Racing	Swift 009.c Ford-Cosworth	1:32.613
7	(United States)	Jimmy Vasser	Chip Ganassi Racing	Reynard 98i Honda	1:32.676
8	(Brazil)	Gil de Ferran	Walker Racing	Reynard 98i Honda	1:32.851
9	(Canada)	Greg Moore	Forsythe Racing	Reynard 98i Mercedes-Benz	1:32.919
10	(Mexico)	Adrián Fernández	Patrick Racing	Reynard 98i Ford-Cosworth	1:33.019
11	(United States)	Bobby Rahal	Team Rahal	Reynard 98i Ford-Cosworth	1:33.068
12	(United States)	Scott Pruett	Patrick Racing	Reynard 98i Ford-Cosworth	1:33.236
13	(Italy)	Max Papis	Arciero-Wells Racing	Reynard 98i Toyota	1:33.375
14	(Brazil)	Tony Kanaan	Tasman Motorsports	Reynard 98i Honda	1:33.543
15	(Finland)	JJ Lehto	Hogan Racing	Reynard 98i Mercedes-Benz	1:33.669
16	(Canada)	Patrick Carpentier	Forsythe Racing	Reynard 98i Mercedes-Benz	1:33.819
17	(United Kingdom)	Mark Blundell	PacWest Racing	Reynard 98i Mercedes-Benz	1:33.820
18	(Brazil)	Hélio Castroneves	Bettenhausen Racing	Reynard 98i Mercedes-Benz	1:34.012
19	(United States)	Al Unser Jr.	Team Penske	Penske PC27 Mercedes-Benz	1:34.260
20	(United States)	Robby Gordon	Arciero-Wells Racing	Reynard 98i Toyota	1:34.344
21	(Brazil)	Maurício Gugelmin	PacWest Racing	Reynard 98i Mercedes-Benz	1:34.375
22	(Brazil)	André Ribeiro	Team Penske	Penske PC27 Mercedes-Benz	1:34.474
23	(United States)	Richie Hearn	Della Penna Motorsports	Swift 009.c Ford-Cosworth	1:34.511
24	(Germany)	Arnd Meier	Davis Racing	Lola T98/00 Ford-Cosworth	1:34.534
25	(Mexico)	Michel Jourdain Jr.	Payton/Coyne Racing	Reynard 98i Ford-Cosworth	1:35.109
26	(United States)	Alex Barron	All American Racers	Eagle 987 Toyota	1:35.285
27	(Italy)	Vincenzo Sospiri	All American Racers	Eagle 987 Toyota	1:36.561
DNQ	(United States)	Dennis Vitolo	Payton/Coyne Racing	Reynard 97i Ford-Cosworth	1:38.726

== Classification ==
=== Race ===
Pos	No	Driver	Team	Laps	Time/retired	Grid	Points
1	1	(Italy) Alex Zanardi	Chip Ganassi Racing	62	2:01:51.170	2	20+1
2	27	(United Kingdom) Dario Franchitti	Team Green	62	+0.322	1	16+1
3	11	(Brazil) Christian Fittipaldi	Newman-Haas Racing	62	+1.029	3	14
4	20	(United States) Scott Pruett	Patrick Racing	62	+6.388	12	12
5	9	(Finland) JJ Lehto	Hogan Racing	62	+10.792	15	10
6	40	(Mexico) Adrián Fernández	Patrick Racing	62	+11.153	10	8
7	21	(Brazil) Tony Kanaan	Tasman Motorsports Group	62	+11.680	14	6
8	99	(Canada) Greg Moore	Forsythe Racing	62	+13.792	9	5
9	33	(Canada) Patrick Carpentier	Forsythe Racing	62	+15.821	16	4
10	8	(United States) Bryan Herta	Team Rahal	62	+16.020	5	3
11	18	(United Kingdom) Mark Blundell	PacWest Racing Group	62	+19.870	17	2
12	17	(Brazil) Maurício Gugelmin	PacWest Racing Group	62	+20.170	21	1
13	3	(Brazil) André Ribeiro	Team Penske	62	+20.729	22	
14	5	(Brazil) Gil de Ferran	Walker Racing	62	+22.072	8	
15	98	(Italy) Vincenzo Sospiri	All American Racing	62	+22.808	27	
16	24	(United States) Robby Gordon	Arciero-Wells Racing	62	+23.747	20	
17	25	(Italy) Max Papis	Arciero-Wells Racing	61	Electrical	13	
18	10	(United States) Richie Hearn	Della Penna Motorsports	60	+2 Laps	23	
19	36	(United States) Alex Barron	All American Racing	59	Contact	26	
20	6	(United States) Michael Andretti	Newman-Haas Racing	59	Contact	6	
21	16	(Brazil) Hélio Castro-Neves	Bettenhausen Racing	54	Contact	18	
22	2	(United States) Al Unser Jr.	Team Penske	53	+9 Laps	19	
23	26	(Canada) Paul Tracy	Team Green	45	Contact	4	
24	12	(United States) Jimmy Vasser	Chip Ganassi Racing	38	Contact	7	
25	7	(United States) Bobby Rahal	Team Rahal	19	Contact	11	
26	19	(Mexico) Michel Jourdain Jr.	Payton/Coyne Racing	11	Contact	25	
27	77	(West Germany) Arnd Meier	Davis Racing	4	Oil leak	24	
DNQ	34	(United States) Dennis Vitolo	Payton/Coyne Racing		Did not Qualify		

== Caution flags ==
Laps	Cause
14–16	Jourdain Jr. (19) contact
21–24	Rahal (7) contact
36–37	Tire wall problem
40–41	Castro-Neves (16), Vasser (12) contact
43–44	Hearn (10) spin
56–58	Castro-Neves (16) contact
61–62	Barron (36), Andretti (6), Hearn (10) contact

== Lap Leaders ==
Laps	Leader
1–13	Dario Franchitti
14–62	Alex Zanardi

Driver	Laps led
Alex Zanardi	49
Dario Franchitti	13

== Point standings after race ==
Pos	Driver	Points
1	(Italy) Alex Zanardi	271
2	(United Kingdom) Dario Franchitti	160
3	(United States) Jimmy Vasser	148
4	(Mexico) Adrián Fernández	142
5	(Canada) Greg Moore	125

Previous race: 1998 Texaco Grand Prix of Houston	CART FedEx Championship Series; 1998 season	Next race: 1998 Marlboro 500 Presented by Toyota
Previous race: 1997 Sunbelt IndyCarnival	Honda Indy 300	Next race: 1999 Honda Indy 300
