= 1998 Motorola 300 =

(United States) 1998 Gateway
Race details
- Race 6 of 19 in the 1998 CART season
- Gateway International Raceway
- Date: May 23, 1998
- Official name: 1998 Motorola 300
- Location: Gateway International Raceway; Madison, Illinois
- Course: Permanent oval course 1.25 mi / 2 km
- Distance: 236 laps 295 mi / 472 km
- Weather: Dry

Pole position
- Driver: (Canada) Greg Moore (Forsythe Racing)
- Time: 25.757

Fastest lap
- Driver: (United States) Jimmy Vasser (Chip Ganassi Racing)
- Time: 26.567 (on lap 26 of 236)

Podium
- First: (Italy) Alex Zanardi (Chip Ganassi Racing)
- Second: (United States) Michael Andretti (Newman-Haas Racing)
- Third: (Canada) Greg Moore (Forsythe Racing)

The 1998 Motorola 300 was the sixth round of the 1998 CART FedEx Champ Car World Series season, held on May 23, 1998, on the Gateway International Raceway in Madison, Illinois. Alex Zanardi came through from 11th on the starting grid to win the race, after a quick pitstop from the Ganassi crew got him out ahead of long-time leader Michael Andretti at the final cycle of stops.

== Classification ==
=== Race ===
Pos	No	Driver	Team	Laps	Time/Retired	Grid	Points
1	1	(Italy) Alex Zanardi	Chip Ganassi Racing	236	2:23:02.140	11	20
2	6	(United States) Michael Andretti	Newman-Haas Racing	236	+0.573	6	16+1
3	99	(Canada) Greg Moore	Forsythe Racing	236	+1.526	1	14+1
4	12	(United States) Jimmy Vasser	Chip Ganassi Racing	236	+17.874	2	12
5	20	(United States) Scott Pruett	Patrick Racing	236	+18.311	17	10
6	5	(Brazil) Gil de Ferran	Walker Racing	236	+18.723	12	8
7	16	(Brazil) Hélio Castro-Neves	Bettenhausen Racing	236	+19.963	8	6
8	7	(United States) Bobby Rahal	Team Rahal	235	+1 Lap	20	5
9	9	(Finland) JJ Lehto	Hogan Racing	235	+1 Lap	4	4
10	18	(United Kingdom) Mark Blundell	PacWest Racing Group	233	+3 Laps	18	3
11	11	(Brazil) Christian Fittipaldi	Newman-Haas Racing	233	+3 Laps	14	2
12	98	(United States) P. J. Jones	All American Racing	232	+4 Laps	21	1
13	24	(United States) Robby Gordon	Arciero-Wells Racing	231	+5 Laps	13	
14	36	(United States) Alex Barron	All American Racing	231	+5 Laps	22	
15	33	(Canada) Patrick Carpentier	Forsythe Racing	231	+5 Laps	16	
16	17	(Brazil) Maurício Gugelmin	PacWest Racing Group	231	+5 Laps	23	
17	19	(Mexico) Michel Jourdain Jr.	Payton/Coyne Racing	230	+6 Laps	25	
18	40	(Mexico) Adrián Fernández	Patrick Racing	206	Engine	10	
19	2	(United States) Al Unser Jr.	Team Penske	169	Contact	9	
20	3	(Brazil) André Ribeiro	Team Penske	106	Transmission	27	
21	77	(West Germany) Arnd Meier	Davis Racing	104	Contact	26	
22	25	(Italy) Max Papis	Arciero-Wells Racing	104	Contact	24	
23	8	(United States) Bryan Herta	Team Rahal	71	Handling	7	
24	21	(Brazil) Tony Kanaan	Tasman Motorsports Group	47	Contact	3	
25	34	(United States) Dennis Vitolo	Payton/Coyne Racing	14	Contact	28	
26	26	(Canada) Paul Tracy	Team Green	2	Contact	15	
27	27	(United Kingdom) Dario Franchitti	Team Green	0	Contact	5	
28	10	(United States) Richie Hearn	Della Penna Motorsports	0	Contact	19	

== Caution flags ==
Laps	Cause
1-11	Franchitti (27), Tracy (26), Carpentier (33), Hearn (10) contact
14-21	Vitolo (34) contact
48-60	Kanaan (21) contact
107-120	Meier (77), Papis (25) contact
172-179	Unser Jr. (2) contact
188-193	Barron (36) spin

== Lap Leaders ==
Laps	Leader
1-42	Jimmy Vasser
43-175	Michael Andretti
176-236	Alex Zanardi

Driver	Laps led
Michael Andretti	133
Alex Zanardi	61
Jimmy Vasser	42

== Point standings after race ==
Pos	Driver	Points
1	(Italy) Alex Zanardi	87
2	(Canada) Greg Moore	86
3	(Mexico) Adrián Fernández	55
4	(United States) Jimmy Vasser	51
5	(United States) Michael Andretti	49
