= 1998 U.S. 500 =

(United States) 1998 U.S. 500
Race details
- Race 12 of 19 in the 1998 CART season
- Michigan International Speedway
- Date: July 26, 1998
- Official name: U.S. 500 Presented by Toyota
- Location: Michigan International Speedway, Brooklyn, Michigan, United States
- Course: Permanent racing facility 2.000 mi / 3.219 km
- Distance: 250 laps 500.000 mi / 804.672 km
- Weather: Dry

Pole position
- Driver: (Mexico) Adrián Fernández (Patrick Racing)
- Time: 31.370

Fastest lap
- Driver: (Canada) Patrick Carpentier (Forsythe Racing)
- Time: 31.508 (on lap 131 of 250)

Podium
- First: (Canada) Greg Moore (Forsythe Racing)
- Second: (United States) Jimmy Vasser (Chip Ganassi Racing)
- Third: (Italy) Alex Zanardi (Chip Ganassi Racing)

The 1998 U.S. 500 was the twelfth round of the 1998 CART FedEx Champ Car World Series season, held on July 26, 1998, at the Michigan International Speedway in Brooklyn, Michigan. The race saw a record 63 lead changes due to the draft of the new Hanford device, and was won by Greg Moore after a thrilling battle in the last five laps with Jimmy Vasser, Alex Zanardi and Scott Pruett.

The race was marred by a crash on lap 175. Adrián Fernández slammed into the outside wall in the fourth turn. His right front wheel was torn off and hurled over the fence into the stands, killing three spectators (Kenneth Fox, Sheryl Laster, and Michael Tautkus) and injuring six others. A subsequent incident in the Indy Racing League's VisionAire 500K the following year resulted in both open-wheel sanctioning bodies (and NASCAR, initially for its Modified Tour series) requiring tethers be installed in wheel hubs, as well as changes to catch fencing on oval tracks, to prevent such re-occurrence.

== Classification ==
=== Race ===
Pos	No	Driver	Team	Laps	Time/Retired	Grid	Points
1	99	(Canada) Greg Moore	Forsythe Racing	250	3:00:48.785	14	20
2	12	(United States) Jimmy Vasser	Chip Ganassi Racing	250	+0.259	2	16
3	1	(Italy) Alex Zanardi	Chip Ganassi Racing	250	+0.267	7	14+1
4	20	(United States) Scott Pruett	Patrick Racing	250	+0.518	6	12
5	10	(United States) Richie Hearn	Della Penna Motorsports	250	+1.356	3	10
6	6	(United States) Michael Andretti	Newman-Haas Racing	250	+1.567	8	8
7	7	(United States) Bobby Rahal	Team Rahal	250	+2.649	12	6
8	33	(Canada) Patrick Carpentier	Forsythe Racing	250	+3.428	21	5
9	26	(Canada) Paul Tracy	Team Green	250	+4.318	15	4
10	8	(United States) Bryan Herta	Team Rahal	250	+26.270	5	3
11	21	(Brazil) Tony Kanaan	Tasman Motorsports Group	249	+1 Lap	20	2
12	16	(Brazil) Hélio Castro-Neves	Bettenhausen Racing	248	+2 Laps	24	1
13	17	(Brazil) Maurício Gugelmin	PacWest Racing Group	248	+2 Laps	17	
14	77	(West Germany) Arnd Meier	Davis Racing	247	+3 Laps	18	
15	36	(United States) Alex Barron	All American Racing	242	+8 Laps	28	
16	5	(Brazil) Gil de Ferran	Walker Racing	240	Engine	10	
17	18	(United Kingdom) Mark Blundell	PacWest Racing Group	240	+10 laps	19	
18	19	(Mexico) Michel Jourdain Jr.	Payton/Coyne Racing	238	+12 Laps	26	
19	25	(Italy) Max Papis	Arciero-Wells Racing	237	Electrical	22	
20	9	(Finland) JJ Lehto	Hogan Racing	223	Contact	13	
21	27	(United Kingdom) Dario Franchitti	Team Green	213	Engine	16	
22	2	(United States) Al Unser Jr.	Team Penske	194	Oil leak	4	
23	40	(Mexico) Adrián Fernández	Patrick Racing	174	Contact	1	1
24	98	(United States) P. J. Jones	All American Racing	111	Engine	27	
25	11	(Brazil) Christian Fittipaldi	Newman-Haas Racing	87	Overheating	9	
26	34	(United States) Dennis Vitolo	Payton/Coyne Racing	85	Contact	25	
27	24	(United States) Robby Gordon	Arciero-Wells Racing	76	Contact	23	
28	3	(Brazil) André Ribeiro	Team Penske	75	Oil leak	11	

== Caution flags ==
Laps	Cause
81-87	Gordon (24) contact
92-100	Vitolo (34) contact
117-123	Jones (98) engine blow-up
176-184	Fernández (40) contact
185-188	Franchitti (27) spin
216-222	Franchitti (27) engine blow-up
227-234	Lehto (9) contact
242-245	de Ferran (5) engine blow-up

== Lap Leaders ==
Laps	Leader
1-2	Al Unser Jr.
3-5	Jimmy Vasser
6-11	Michael Andretti
12-13	Jimmy Vasser
14	Michael Andretti
15-17	Jimmy Vasser
18-30	Michael Andretti
31-34	Gil de Ferran
35-37	Richie Hearn
38-65	Michael Andretti
66-68	Gil de Ferran
69	Adrián Fernández
70	Gil de Ferran
71	Greg Moore
72-75	Richie Hearn
76-83	Michael Andretti
84-89	Greg Moore
90-91	Richie Hearn
92-101	Greg Moore
102	Richie Hearn
103	Greg Moore
104	Richie Hearn
105-118	Greg Moore
119-125	Paul Tracy
126-128	Gil de Ferran
129	Paul Tracy
130-132	Gil de Ferran
133	Paul Tracy
134	Michael Andretti
135-136	Paul Tracy
137-138	Michael Andretti
139-140	Gil de Ferran
141	Michael Andretti
142-145	Gil de Ferran
146	Adrián Fernández
147-150	Gil de Ferran
151-157	Adrián Fernández
158-159	Greg Moore
160-165	Paul Tracy
166-168	Alex Zanardi
169-170	Paul Tracy
171-176	Alex Zanardi
177-178	Michael Andretti
179-190	Alex Zanardi
191	Paul Tracy
192-193	Alex Zanardi
194	Al Unser Jr.
195-196	Alex Zanardi
197	Paul Tracy
198-199	Alex Zanardi
200	Paul Tracy
201-202	Gil de Ferran
203-224	Alex Zanardi
225	Jimmy Vasser
226-237	Alex Zanardi
238	Jimmy Vasser
239	Alex Zanardi
240-245	Jimmy Vasser
246	Alex Zanardi
247	Jimmy Vasser
248	Greg Moore
249	Jimmy Vasser
250	Greg Moore

Driver	Laps led
Alex Zanardi	63
Michael Andretti	62
Greg Moore	36
Gil de Ferran	26
Paul Tracy	22
Jimmy Vasser	18
Richie Hearn	11
Adrián Fernández	9
Al Unser Jr.	3

== Point standings after race ==
Pos	Driver	Points
1	(Italy) Alex Zanardi	190
2	(United States) Jimmy Vasser	122
3	(Canada) Greg Moore	119
4	(United States) Michael Andretti	92
5	(Mexico) Adrián Fernández	90
