= Greg Moore (racing driver) =

Canadian racing driver (1975–1999)

- Moore in 1996
- Nationality: (Canada) Canadian
- Born: Gregory William Moore; April 22, 1975; New Westminster, British Columbia, Canada
- Died: October 31, 1999 (aged 24); Fontana, California, United States
- Cause of death: Blunt force trauma due to racing accident
- Height: 5 ft 11 in (1.80 m)
- Weight: 160 lb (73 kg)
- Achievements: 1995 Indy Lights champion

Champ Car career
- 72 races run over 4 years
- Years active: 1996–1999
- Team: Forsythe Racing
- Best finish: 5th (1998)
- First race: 1996 Marlboro Grand Prix of Miami (Homestead)
- Last race: 1999 Marlboro 500 (California)
- First win: 1997 Milwaukee Miller Lite 200 (Milwaukee)
- Last win: 1999 Marlboro Grand Prix of Miami (Homestead)
Wins	Podiums	Poles
5	17	5

Signature
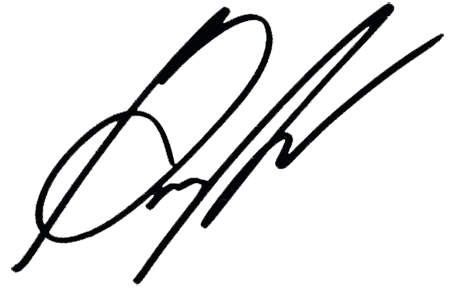

Gregory William Moore (April 22, 1975 – October 31, 1999) was a Canadian professional race car driver who competed in the Indy Lights and Championship Auto Racing Teams (CART) series from 1993 to 1999. He began competitive karting at the age of ten and achieved early success, before progressing to open-wheel car racing in the Canadian Formula Ford Championship in 1991. Moore won the 1992 USAC FF2000 Western Division Championship and the 1995 Indy Lights Championship.

Moore began competing in CART with Forsythe Racing in 1996, finishing ninth in the drivers' championship and was second to Alex Zanardi in the Rookie of the Year standings. The following year, Moore claimed the first two victories of his career to finish seventh in the points' standings. He improved on his performance to place fifth overall with a further two wins in 1998. In 1999, he took another win as his form lowered and fell to tenth. At the season-ending Marlboro 500 at California Speedway, Moore was killed in a violent airborne collision with a concrete barrier on the race's tenth lap. He was the second driver to be killed in CART competition in 1999 after Gonzalo Rodríguez three races earlier at Mazda Raceway Laguna Seca. It was scheduled to be Moore's final race for Forsythe Racing before moving to Team Penske in 2000.

Overall, Moore competed in 72 CART races, winning five and achieving 17 podium finishes. Due to the split between CART and the IRL, Moore never competed in or won the Indianapolis 500. He was a popular figure known as an oval track specialist. Moore's car number 99 was retired from the list of those available to drivers competing in CART and its support series as a mark of respect. Since his death, the Greg Moore Foundation was established in his honour to continue his legacy through charitable causes. Three establishments in British Columbia have been named after the driver. Moore was posthumously inducted into the Canadian Motorsport Hall of Fame and BC Sports Hall of Fame in 2000.

== Early life ==
Gregory William Moore was born in the Vancouver suburb of New Westminster, British Columbia on April 22, 1975. His father, Ric, owned a Chrysler dealership in Maple Ridge, a city close to Vancouver, and raced Can-Am cars at the club level, at tracks such as Westwood Motorsport Park. He divorced his wife Donna when Moore was five years old and Greg lived with his mother until the start of his karting career. He had two siblings: a brother and a sister. Moore was first educated at Meadowridge School. He was transferred to Pitt Meadows Secondary School for the final two years of his education, where he graduated with honours in 1993. (Note: Moore and his father had an agreement he would stop racing if he did not achieve a good academic performance in his final year of schooling.)

Moore often climbed into his father's race car and pretended to race by gripping the steering wheel. That encouraged his interest in auto racing, and his father gave him a go-kart at the age of six. Moore drove the go-kart with a minivan's plastic bodywork around it in the parking lot of his father's dealership. He developed vehicular control on dry slick tyres on a wet track. He began competitive go-kart racing at the age of ten, and joined the Westwood Karting Club soon after. It was there Moore was issued with his car number 99 because he was the club's 99th member; he used it throughout his career. (Note: It is a common misconception that Moore chose number 99 because it was the number worn by hockey player Wayne Gretzky, one of his idols.) His father acted as his manager, tutor and financier and adopted a "no-nonsense" approach to his career.

While he had an inclination towards racing, Moore also played ice hockey. From the age of ten, Moore was a goalie, and began to drive go-karts in 1986. He was twice named Maple Ridge Athlete of the Year and he won the British Columbia Hockey Provincial Championship. Moore played on the same minor ice hockey team as future professional player Paul Kariya. When he was 14, his father urged him to choose between ice hockey and racing if he wanted to further develop in sports. Moore ultimately decided to focus on racing. His sporting idols were ice hockey player Wayne Gretzky and three-time Formula One World Champion Ayrton Senna.

== Junior career ==
In 1989 and 1990, Moore won the North American Enduro Kart Racing Championship. His father wanted to know whether his son's achievements were down to his driving abilities or the equipment. He took Moore to the Spenard-David Racing School in Shannonville, Ontario, in August 1990, where racer David Empringham instructed him. He won a race over 40 drivers. Track owner Richard Spenard was impressed by Moore's ability and invited him to return later that year to partake in a "Top Gun" series. He got a special waiver to enter the school, and won against almost 800 fellow drivers at the conclusion of the school's three-day run-offs. Moore learnt how to select a lower gear, where to locate the apex of a corner, and how to avoid an accident.

Moore made the decision to progress to car racing in 1991, and was assigned Steve Challis as his race engineer and adviser. Moore competed in the eight-round Canadian Formula Ford Championship in a Van Diemen RF91-Ford; his father purchased the car from England and competed against drivers double his age. He won the Shannonville Motorsport Park round, and took a further four top-ten results to finish fourth in the final points' standings with 120 accrued. He was named the series' Rookie of the Year. Moore moved to the higher-tier USAC FF2000 Western Division Championship in 1992 after plans to enter the Canadian F2000 Championship fell through when that series folded. He took four pole positions and four victories en route to taking the championship at the season's final round at Willow Springs. Moore was voted Rookie of the Year at this tier after advancing at the start of the season, and was inducted into the series' Hall of Fame in 1999 as a 1992 graduate. For winning the title, he drove a Formula Atlantic car in California and tested for Van Diemen at Snetterton Circuit in England.

During the off-season, Moore was employed in the service department of a dealership in Duncan, British Columbia. For 1993, his family believed a progression to Formula Atlantic would help his career develop. The series' sanctioning body, the Sports Car Club of America, refused to grant Moore a racing licence because he was under the age of 18 at the time. Moore's father talked to the president and CEO of Indy Lights Roger Bailey in Vancouver, who agreed to grant Moore a provisional racing licence for the 1993 season's first two rounds at Phoenix International Raceway and Long Beach. Because he was 17, he was obliged to remain in his car in the pit lane until he was towed into the paddock, and was then allowed to vacate. Around this time, Moore asked permission from Brian Stewart, owner of Brian Stewart Racing, to retain race number 99 after it was assigned to Stewart's team for the 1992 season. He sought to win Rookie of the Year and finish in the top five in points. In twelve races, Moore took seven top-ten finishes, with a best result of third at Portland International Raceway, and placed ninth in the points' standings with 64 points. He was one of the fastest drivers on oval tracks but was slower on road and street circuits.

Before the 1994 season, Moore did a conditioning program to lose weight and improve his stamina, and his car was rebuilt following analysis. His team had a small budget of US$380,000 and the family home and dealership was mortgaged to allow Moore to continue racing. Their financial situation forced him to drive conservatively to preserve tires three times longer than other drivers, and not strain mechanical parts, since his family lacked the capital to purchase additional equipment. Nevertheless, in the season's opening round at Phoenix, Moore surpassed Paul Tracy's record as the youngest Indy Lights pole position starter at age 18, and became the youngest driver in history to win a Championship Auto Racing Teams (CART)-sanctioned event. He won two more races (at New Hampshire Motor Speedway and Nazareth Speedway) to finish the championship with 154 points and take third in the drivers' standings. In November 1994, Moore undertook a two-day test session with Penske Racing's CART team on a test-specific road course at Nazareth Speedway.

Moore's reputation and recognition of his ability (and lobbying by his father) attracted the attention of Forsythe Racing owner Gerald Forsythe, who sought a Canadian driver for his Indy Lights team in 1995. Forsythe was willing to relieve Moore's financial burdens that had built up when a sponsorship agreement fell through in mid-1994 and had seen his father take out mortgages by incorporating his son into the team, and signing Moore to a five-year contract. Three of Moore's mechanics transferred from his family's team to Forsythe Racing. While his father remained his manager, he did not join the organization as an employee. Driving a Lola T93/20-Buick 3800 V6, he dominated the championship, winning ten of twelve races. He broke the record for consecutive wins at the season's start with the first five races and the most victories in an Indy Lights season, both held by Paul Tracy from the 1990 championship (nine out of fourteen). Moore led a total of 375 out of 583 laps over all twelve races, covering 847.799 miles (1,364.400 km) en route to winning the drivers' championship with a record 242 points scored.

== Championship Auto Racing Teams ==
=== 1996: Debut season ===
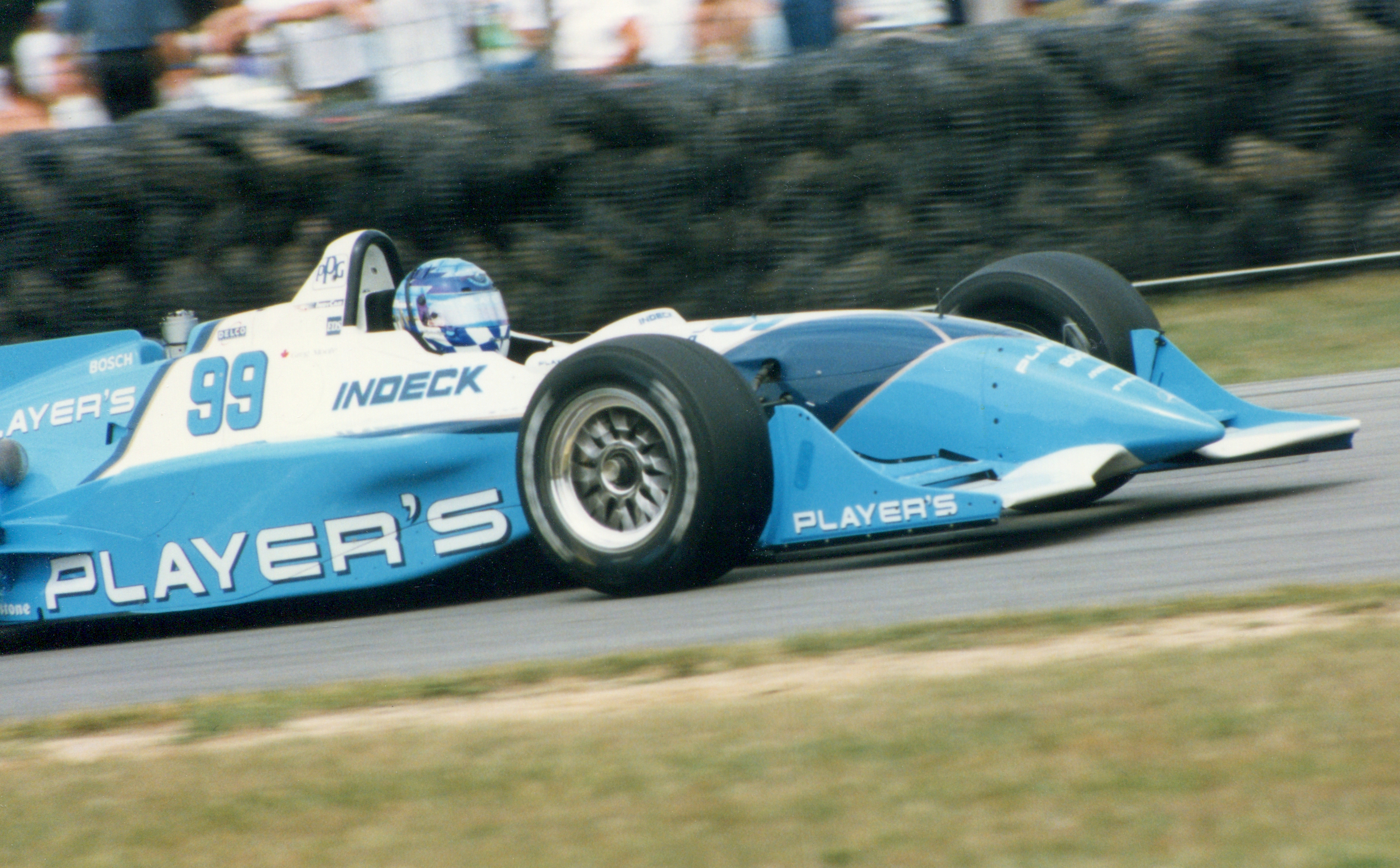
Moore driving for Forsythe Racing during practice for the 1996 Miller 200 at Mid-Ohio Sports Car Course.

After testing for Forsythe Racing at Phoenix International Raceway in September 1995, the team's primary sponsor, Player's, confirmed on October 19 that Moore would replace the outgoing Jacques Villeneuve for the 1996 season after Villenuve decided to go to Formula 1. He spent 30 days testing for the team in the United States, and underwent a conditioning program to prepare himself physically with the 750 hp (560 kW) turbocharged No. 99 Reynard 96I Mercedes-Benz IC108 V8t for the 200-mile (320 km) to 500-mile (800 km) races. Fellow drivers did not give him much advice so Moore observed them. He debuted at the season-opening Grand Prix of Miami at the Homestead–Miami Speedway. Starting in sixth he finished in seventh, after incurring a stop-and-go penalty for an illegal overtake on Juan Manuel Fangio II under yellow flag conditions, and unlapped himself from the race winner, Jimmy Vasser. Two races later, Moore had the first podium of his career (third place) at Surfers Paradise Street Circuit. He bettered that result with a second-place finish at Nazareth Speedway two rounds after that. Although Forsythe Racing had sub-par equipment, he regularly challenged for victories and claimed three podium finishes. Moore finished his rookie season ninth in the drivers' standings with 84 points, and was second to Alex Zanardi in the Rookie of the Year standings.

=== 1997: First two victories ===
For the 1997 CART World Series, Moore drove a 1996 Reynard vehicle after trials of a Lola car in pre-season testing at Homestead–Miami Speedway reduced Forsythe Racing's performance. He began the season with three top-four finishes—including second-places at Surfers Paradise and Autódromo Internacional Nelson Piquet—in the first six races. At the season's seventh race, the Miller Genuine Draft 200 at the Milwaukee Mile, Moore ran the final 92 laps without making a pit stop. He held off Michael Andretti to take his first career victory becoming—at the age of 22 years, 1 month and 10 days—the youngest driver to win a CART race. (Note: The record for the youngest winner of a CART-sanctioned event was broken by Scott Dixon in 2001 and later surpassed by Nelson Philippe in its successor organization Champ Car World Series five years later.) A week later, he won the ITT Automotive Detroit Grand Prix at The Raceway on Belle Isle after PacWest Racing teammates Maurício Gugelmin and Mark Blundell ran out of fuel on the final lap. Thereafter Moore, who was considered a contender for the championship, achieved two top-five finishes at Mid-Ohio Sports Car Course and Portland International Raceway as mechanical attrition and accidents hindered him. He was seventh in the points standings with 111.

=== 1998: Fifth place in points ===
For the 1998 season, Moore drove a Reynard car with a lighter and smaller Mercedes-Benz engine, and built up his endurance for races in training. The season-opening Grand Prix of Miami saw Moore start from pole position for the first time in his career, becoming—at the age of 22 years, 10 months and 18 days—the youngest pole position starter in CART history. He finished the race in second position after an air jack fault during a pit stop dropped him down the order and he gained track position. Nevertheless, Moore continued driving well, taking another three top-ten finishes in the next three races becoming the drivers' championship leader. At the Rio 400, he took his third career victory for an increased points' lead with a pass on Zanardi with five laps to go. Moore took two more pole positions at Gateway International Raceway and The Raceway on Belle Isle, and his second win of 1998 at the U.S. 500 at Michigan International Speedway and the Vanderbilt Cup after a duel between the Chip Ganassi Racing duo of Zanardi and Jimmy Vasser in the final five laps. The rest of his season included five consecutive retirements, and a fourth career pole position at the Grand Prix of Houston, despite his engine lacking traction on road courses. At the season-ending Marlboro 500 at California Speedway, Moore finished second after Vasser passed him before the last lap. He placed fifth in the drivers' standings with 141 points, and his performance throughout the season established him as one of CART's top drivers.

=== 1999: Final season ===
Entering the 1999 season, CART's fanbase and the media considered Moore a favourite to win the title. He spent much of the pre-season testing on road and street courses, telling the New York Daily News his objective for the season was to win as many races as possible and claim the drivers' championship. He led 96 laps in his fifth career win at the season-opening round, the Grand Prix of Miami, from the pole position. Moore said afterward he learned from Alex Zanardi to accept finishing a race without a victory as part of maturing as a driver. He finished in the top ten four more times over the next six races, losing the lead in the points standings after a 12th-place finish at the season's fourth round, the Bosch Spark Plug Grand Prix at Nazareth Speedway. Moore's qualifying performance diminished thereafter, as he fell further in the drivers' championship. He took three additional finishes within the top four in the season's final eleven races, as he drove an under-powered, unreliable car fitted with a Mercedes-Benz engine. He concluded the season tenth with 97 points in the drivers' championship.

=== Contract negotiations for the 2000 season ===
With his five-year contract with Forsythe Racing ending after the 1999 season, Moore began negotiations with several CART teams and other auto racing series. He admitted to being interested in NASCAR, and established friendships with drivers such as Jeff Burton, and discussed competing in stock cars with Bobby Labonte. Moore told USA Today: "I think your career can be longer over there. You can be older and still be competitive because of the way the cars are. It's not as physically demanding. It's more a thinking-man's kind of thing." He discussed driving for Cal Wells' PPI Motorsports team, and with Andy Petree Racing. Moore entered into discussions with Forsythe Racing on June 30. Team owner Gerald Forsythe made him an offer that was rejected because of monetary limitations. In August 1999, Moore signed a $10 million three-year contract to replace Al Unser Jr. at Penske's CART team from 2000 onward alongside Gil de Ferran. (Note: After Moore's death, the contract became controversial after Penske scratched Moore's name and his representatives with those of Hélio Castroneves, so that the team was set by the sponsor-imposed deadline of November. This caused Castroneves to be charged with (and eventually acquitted of) tax evasion in 2009.) According to CART driver Tony Kanaan, Moore planned to spend three to four more years in CART, before entering NASCAR.

== Other racing ventures ==
Frank Williams, the founder and principal of the Williams Formula One team, asked about Moore's services as a test driver, but was told he was under contract to Forsythe Racing. Moore was asked by the Canadian Broadcasting Corporation to fill in for commentator Jackie Stewart for its broadcast of the 1997 Canadian Grand Prix. Formula One officials forbade it because he was a CART driver.

In late 1997, Moore drove for AMG-Mercedes in the FIA GT Championship at the season's final two rounds, the Sebring 3 Hours and the Laguna Seca 3 Hours, sharing the No. 12 Mercedes-Benz CLK GTR with Alexander Wurz in the GT1 category. Their car finished in seventh place in both races. (Note: Moore was originally scheduled to share the car with Klaus Ludwig.) Moore was one of twelve drivers invited to compete in the four-race International Race of Champions (IROC) stock car racing series in 1999. Driving a Pontiac Firebird, he finished 12th (and last) in the points' standings with three top-ten finishes and earned 25 points.

== Death ==
The Marlboro 500 at California Speedway on October 31 was the final race of the 1999 season, and was scheduled to be Moore's last race with Forsythe Racing before moving to Penske in 2000. On the morning of the day before the race, he was knocked off his motor scooter by a paddock vehicle in the hospitality area because its driver was blinded by the rising sun. Moore suffered a deep laceration to his right hand that required fifteen stitches, bruising to his right hip, and a fractured index finger on his right hand. Uncertain whether Moore would participate, Forsythe Racing employed Roberto Moreno as an emergency reserve driver in the event doctors deemed Moore unfit to race. After a six-lap on-track test session, which he was judged to have run at a sufficient pace later that day, and two medical consultations with Steve Olvey, CART's director of medical affairs, he was permitted to drive in a protective hand brace and use a modified steering wheel. Officials required him to start at the back of the grid because he missed qualifying.

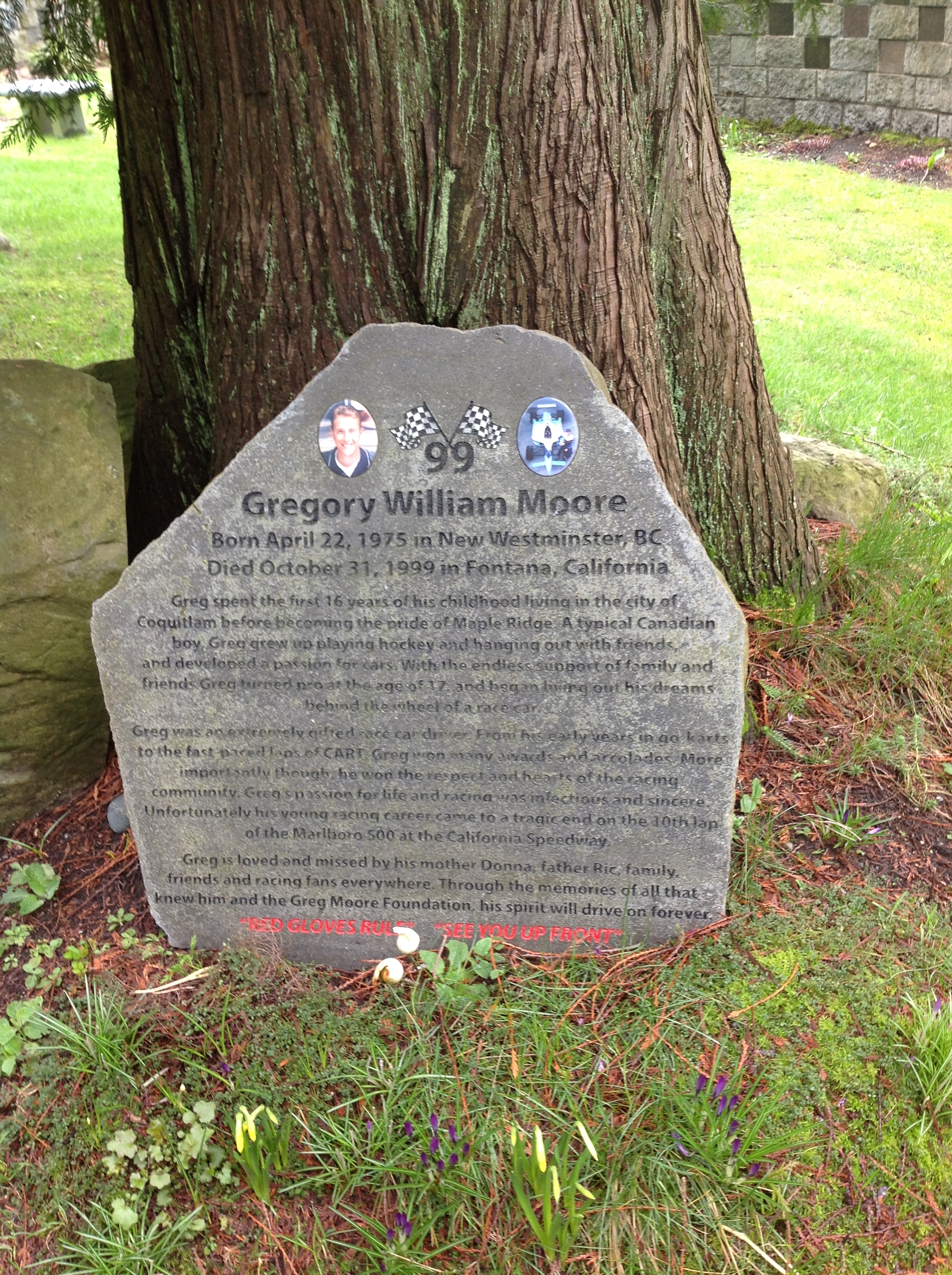
Moore's memorial headstone at Robinson Memorial Park Cemetery

Following an early race rolling restart for a fourth-lap accident for Richie Hearn that entailed five slow laps behind the pace car to allow for Hearn's car to be cleared, on lap 10, Moore was 15th when he lost control of his car midway through turn two, possibly due to losing the slipstream of a car ahead of him. He attempted to regain control but left skid marks on the track as he spun almost 500 ft (150 m) down the circuit, and into the infield grass at more than 220 mph (350 km/h). Moore hit an access road lower than the damp grass he had gone across earlier, went sideways into the air for about 30 feet (9.1 m), barrel rolled and slammed into an immovable infield concrete barrier lacking a tire wall to absorb the impact at unabated speed at a 90-degree angle. The impact, registered at 154 g_{0} (1,510 m/s^{2}) by the vehicle's black box, (Note: The force of the collision was the largest ever recorded by a CART crash data sensor.) split the car in two, scattered a large amount of debris as the open-cockpit compartment seating the driver disintegrated. Moore's helmet struck the ground multiple times before the car rested upside down after spinning four times. He was extricated from it and administered cardiopulmonary resuscitation by circuit medics before being transported by helicopter to Loma Linda University Medical Center. Moore was pronounced dead at 1:21 pm Pacific Standard Time (UTC−08:00) with severe head and internal injuries. He was the second driver to die from injuries sustained in a crash during a CART race that season: Gonzalo Rodríguez died in a practice accident at Mazda Raceway Laguna Seca three races earlier.

At the pronouncement of Moore's death, chief steward Wally Dallenbach Sr. ordered all track flags to be lowered to half staff and no post-race celebrations occurred. The other drivers were not informed of the situation until the event's conclusion. At the request of Moore's father, the CART end-of-season awards banquet at The Century Plaza Hotel continued as scheduled the following night; (Note: The banquet was initially cancelled as a result of a meeting between CART officials and the series' title sponsors.) its format was changed to include a 15-minute tribute to Moore and Rodríguez. Makeshift memorials were built at Pitt Meadows Secondary School and his father's car dealership. The Canadian Motor Sports Hall of Fame had a book of condolence for fans to sign for later delivery to the Moore family. He was cremated on November 2. A private memorial service was held at St. Andrew's-Wesley United Church in downtown Vancouver, attended by 1,200 family members and close friends on the following day. On November 4, a second public memorial service took place at Maple Ridge Baptist Church in Moore's home town of Maple Ridge attended by 1,500 mourners.

CART impounded what was left of Moore's car for an investigation into the cause of the accident, and would review footage of the event. On December 20, CART stated its investigation of Moore's crash found there was no single cause for it. CART engineers obtained and analyzed a plethora of data from equipment installed in Moore's car, discovering he began losing vehicular control halfway in turn two but not why it went airborne on the asphalt access road. Tim Mayer, CART's vice-president of racing operations, commented, "I think the answers we know show that there isn't a clear-cut answer, but he was reacting to a situation that started in the middle of Turn Two, and there's nothing there that seems unusual. We're confident that there was no mechanical failure. The cause of the accident is something of a mystery. I mean that the initial factor that set the chain of events in motion is unknown."

== Driving style and racing overalls ==
Moore was described as having "Gilles Villeneuve-esque car control" that accompanied "his fearless style, and his incredible determination." In his CART career, he was known as an oval track specialist, locating the optimum amount of grip as he drove near to oversteering. Moore refined this ability after having difficulty on oval tracks in his first two years in Indy Lights. He drove the car correctly, always wanting to retain control of the rear end of his car. He learned to drive a "loose" car after his father entered him in some ice races on the advice of race engineer Steve Challis. During practice for the oval track races, he focused on the set-up of his vehicle believing he could pass other drivers in the race.

Moore's Indy Lights helmet design featured a mixture of lightning bolts and a checkered flag. Upon moving to CART, Forsythe Racing's primary sponsor asked for a more subtle and corporate helmet design. Regardless of the blue colour of his team's primary sponsor Player's, Moore wore a pair of red racing gloves to emphasise the pride in his Canadian nationality.

== Personality and legacy ==
Iain MacIntyre of the Vancouver Sun described Moore as "tall and fair-haired with wire-rimmed glasses" and someone who "possessed a wholesome, innocent bearing and boyish enthusiasm that was infectious." Race car driver Mario Andretti described him as articulate, a meaningful speaker, and considered him "very professional and mature for his age". Moore was cordial with the media, and CART fans and fellow drivers regarded him with affection because of his occasional "wacky and over-the-top sense of humour", particularly with children. He was serious while driving, was positive career-wise, played practical jokes on others outside of his profession, and was devoted to his family and fans. Moore admitted to errors he had made, established friendships with several drivers and organized social gatherings. From August 1998 until his death, he led a four-man international group of drivers called "The Brat Pack" with Max Papis, Dario Franchitti, and Tony Kanaan. (Note: "The Brat Pack" was a name derived from the Frank Sinatra-led Rat Pack group of entertainers who enlivened the Hollywood party scene in the 1950s and 1960s.) The quartet had an energetic longing for enjoyment, going to all-night parties, discussing life, and for maintaining close contact with one another.

His talent on track was special, he was bloody good at thinking through a race. The record books only tell half the story, in the way of someone like Gilles Villeneuve. You look at that and go, 'He won how many races?' but he's considered one of the most talented drivers of all time. I think Greg goes down in that same category.

— Dario Franchitti on Moore's legacy as a driver.

As a mark of respect, CART, Indy Lights and Formula Atlantic retired Moore's car number 99 from the list of those available to drivers in all three series. On September 1, 2000, CART established the Greg Moore Legacy Award to honour "the driver who best typifies Moore's legacy of outstanding talent on track as well as displaying a dynamic personality with fans, media and within the CART community." A maximum of four or five drivers were nominated by a panel of experts with at least one competitor representing CART, Indy Lights and Formula Atlantic. Hélio Castroneves was its first recipient in 2000. Others to receive the award include Dario Franchitti in 2001, Sébastien Bourdais in 2003, Ryan Hunter-Reay in 2004, and J. R. Hildebrand when it was limited to Indy Lights drivers in 2009. The 2010 award was presented to James Hinchcliffe, a driver who idolizes Moore and put a pair of Moore's red racing gloves in his race suit in qualifying for the 2012 Indianapolis 500. Others to list Moore as a role model include Jaguar I-Pace eTrophy competitor Stefan Rzadzinski and sports car driver Scott Hargrove.

The Greg Moore Foundation was established by his father to continue his son's legacy through charitable work. It supports scholarships for young people to continue their education after graduating from secondary school, provides funding to five health charities and local hospitals, aids in the development of amateur athletes and works against drunk driving. Moore was posthumously awarded the Jack Diamond Award, which honours "an individual who consistently demonstrated a competitive and co-operative spirit, who excelled in sport and who made a positive contribution to the community". It was collected by his family at a dinner ceremony in Vancouver's Jewish Community Centre on February 15, 2000. He was posthumously inducted into the Canadian Motorsport Hall of Fame and the BC Sports Hall of Fame that year. In 2007, Moore's stepmother opened a glass case gallery containing his racing artifacts in the BC Sports Hall of Fame. A kart track in Chilliwack, a youth centre in Maple Ridge established in October 2001, and the Emergency Department at the Ridge Meadows Hospital inaugurated eight years later by British Columbia Premier Gordon Campbell and the Minister of Health George Abbott are all named after Moore. Turn 2 at Mission Raceway Park is named "Greg Moore Turn", marked by a bronze sign.

Moore was honoured by the organizers of the Molson Indy Vancouver with the words "Courage, Greg Moore No. 99" written in large white block letters across the start/finish line of the Concord Pacific Place temporary street circuit in 2000. Starting from that year's race until its discontinuation in 2004, the pole position starter received the Greg Moore Pole Award. A book Greg Moore: A Legacy of Spirit written by journalists Dan Proudfoot, Jim Taylor and Gordon Kirby was published by Whitecap Books on August 30, 2000. The following year, a documentary to complement the book Greg Moore – A Racer's Story, was narrated and hosted by actress Ashley Judd. It was shown twice on The Sports Network in 2001 and had a subsequent release on VHS. Dario Franchitti dedicated his 2002 Molson Indy Vancouver win to Moore, and again after his 2009 IndyCar Series championship victory. A second documentary, A Hero's Drive: The Greg Moore Tribute, was shown on Sportsnet in May 2013. Two months later, Autosport magazine named Moore one of the 50 greatest drivers to have never raced in Formula One.

== Racing record ==
=== Racing career summary ===
Season	Series	Team	Races	Wins	Podium	Poles	Point	Position
1992	USAC FF2000 Eastern Division Championship	n/a	2	1	2	0	36	8th
1992	USAC FF2000 Western Division Championship	n/a	7	4	5	3	118	**1st**
1993	Firestone Indy Lights Championship	Greg Moore Racing	12	0	1	0	64	9th
1994	Firestone Indy Lights Championship	Greg Moore Racing	12	3	6	2	154	**3rd**
1995	PPG/Firestone Indy Lights Championship	Forsythe Racing	12	10	11	7	242	**1st**
1996	PPG Indy Car World Series	Forsythe Racing	16	0	3	0	84	9th
1997	CART PPG World Series	Forsythe Racing	17	2	5	0	111	7th
1997	FIA GT Championship	AMG-Mercedes	2	0	0	0	0	NC
1998	CART FedEx Championship Series	Forsythe Racing	19	2	6	4	140	5th
1999	FedEx Championship Series	Forsythe Racing	20	1	3	1	97	10th
1999	International Race Of Champions	CART Series	3	0	0	0	25	12th

=== American open-wheel racing results ===
(key) (Races in bold indicate pole position) (Races in italics indicate fastest lap) (Small number denotes finishing position)

==== Indy Lights ====
Year	Team	1	2	3	4	5	6	7	8	9	10	11	12	Rank	Points	Ref
1993	Greg Moore Racing	PHX; 5	LBH; 17	MIL; 5	DET; 8	POR; 3	CLE; 10	TOR; 8	NHA; 16	VAN; 18	MOH; 4	NAZ; 8	LGS; 19	**9th**	**64**	
1994	Greg Moore Racing	**PHX**; 1	LBH; 2	MIL; 3	DET; 7	POR; 5	CLE; 2	**TOR**; 12	MOH; 7	NHA; 1	VAN; 5	NAZ; 1	LGS; 5	**3rd**	**154**	
1995	Player's/Forsythe Racing	**MIA**; 1	PHX; 1	**LBH**; 1	NAZ; 1	MIL; 1	DET; 2	**POR**; 1	**TOR**; 1	**CLE**; 1	NHA; 1	**VAN**; 5	**LGS**; 1	**1st**	**242**	

==== CART ====
Year	Team	Chassis	Engine	1	2	3	4	5	6	7	8	9	10	11	12	13	14	15	16	17	18	19	20	Rank	Points	Ref
1996	Player's/Forsythe Racing	Reynard 96I	Mercedes-Benz IC108C V8 t	MIA; 7	RIO; 18	SRF; 3	LBH; 22	NAZ; 2	US; 13	MIL; 5	DET; 20	POR; 25	CLE; 3	TOR; 4	MIC; 17	MOH; 9	ROA; 23	VAN; 25	LAG; 6					**9th**	**84**	
1997	Player's/Forsythe Racing	Reynard 97I	Mercedes-Benz IC108D V8 t	MIA; 4	SRF; 2	LBH; 23	NAZ; 16	RIO; 2	GAT; 13	MIL; 1	DET; 1	POR; 5	CLE; 24	TOR; 23	MIC; 27	MOH; 2	ROA; 18	VAN; 17	LAG; 24	FON; 13				**7th**	**111**	
1998	Player's/Forsythe Racing	Reynard 98I	Mercedes-Benz IC108E V8 t	**MIA**; 2	MOT; 4	LBH; 6	NAZ; 3	RIO; 1	**GAT**; 3	MIL; 13	**DET**; 5	POR; 27	CLE; 25	TOR; 11	MIC; 1	MOH; 22	ROA; 21	VAN; 20	LAG; 21	**HOU**; 26	SRF; 8	FON; 2		**5th**	**141**	
1999	Player's/Forsythe Racing	Reynard 99I	Mercedes-Benz IC108E V8 t	**MIA**; 1	MOT; 4	LBH; 8	NAZ; 12	RIO; 8	GAT; 6	MIL; 2	POR; 13	CLE; 18	ROA; 4	TOR; 20	MIC; 23	DET; 3	MOH; 11	CHI; 26	VAN; 20	LAG; 23	HOU; 16	SRF; 17	FON; 26	**10th**	**97**	

=== International Race of Champions ===
(key) (Bold – Pole position. * – Most laps led. Small number denotes finishing position)

International Race of Champions results
Year	Make	1	2	3	4	Pos.	Points	Ref
1999	Pontiac	DAY; 5	TAL; 7	MCH; 9	IND; 12	12th	25	

== See also ==
- List of Canadians in Champ Car

== Bibliography ==
- Proudfoot, Dan; Kirby, Gordon; Taylor, Jim (2000). Greg Moore: A Legacy of Spirit. North Vancouver, British Columbia: Whitecap Books Ltd. ISBN 1-55285-139-7 – via Open Library.
- Ferriss, Paul (2001). Never Too Fast: The Paul Tracy Story. Toronto, Canada: ECW Press. ISBN 978-1-55022-469-6 – via Google Books.
- Hummel, Alan (2007). Penske Racing Team: 40 Years of Excellence. Pepin, Wisconsin: Enthusiast Books. p. 219. ISBN 978-1-58388-195-8 – via Open Library.

Preceded by Gonzalo Rodríguez	Fatalities in CART/IndyCar; 1999	Succeeded by Tony Renna
Sporting positions
Preceded by Steve Robertson	Indy Lights Champion; 1995	Succeeded by David Empringham
