= 1998 Medic Drug Grand Prix of Cleveland =

(United States) 1998 Cleveland
Race details
- Race 10 of 19 in the 1998 CART season
- Burke Lakefront Airport track layout
- Date: July 12, 1998
- Official name: 1998 Medic Drug Grand Prix of Cleveland
- Location: Burke Lakefront Airport; Cleveland, Ohio, United States
- Course: Temporary airport course 2.369 mi / 3.790 km
- Distance: 100 laps 236.9 mi / 379 km
- Weather: Dry with temperatures reaching up to 75.9 °F (24.4 °C); wind speeds reaching up to 9.9 miles per hour (15.9 km/h)

Pole position
- Driver: (United States) Jimmy Vasser (Chip Ganassi Racing)
- Time: 56.417

Fastest lap
- Driver: (United States) Bryan Herta (Team Rahal)
- Time: 58.817 (on lap 97 of 100)

Podium
- First: (Italy) Alex Zanardi (Chip Ganassi Racing)
- Second: (United States) Michael Andretti (Newman/Haas Racing)
- Third: (United Kingdom) Dario Franchitti (Team KOOL Green)

The 1998 Medic Drug Grand Prix of Cleveland was the tenth round of the 1998 CART FedEx Champ Car World Series season, held on July 12, 1998, at the Burke Lakefront Airport in Cleveland, Ohio. The race, once again was won by defending champion Alex Zanardi, who dominated the race once he passed his teammate and polesitter Jimmy Vasser (who was suffering from gearbox problems) on a restart. The win was Zanardi's third consecutive of the season.

== Classification ==
=== Race ===
Pos	No	Driver	Team	Laps	Time/Retired	Grid	Points
1	1	(Italy) Alex Zanardi	Chip Ganassi Racing	100	1:52:22.282	3	20+1
2	6	(United States) Michael Andretti	Newman-Haas Racing	100	+8.422	7	16
3	27	(United Kingdom) Dario Franchitti	Team Green	100	+8.901	2	14
4	20	(United States) Scott Pruett	Patrick Racing	100	+18.384	14	12
5	40	(Mexico) Adrián Fernández	Patrick Racing	100	+28.069	17	10
6	5	(Brazil) Gil de Ferran	Walker Racing	100	+28.608	11	8
7	12	(United States) Jimmy Vasser	Chip Ganassi Racing	100	+29.120	1	6+1
8	7	(United States) Bobby Rahal	Team Rahal	100	+31.265	10	5
9	33	(Canada) Patrick Carpentier	Forsythe Racing	100	+36.234	15	4
10	18	(United Kingdom) Mark Blundell	PacWest Racing Group	100	+38.334	6	3
11	11	(Brazil) Christian Fittipaldi	Newman-Haas Racing	100	+43.590	13	2
12	25	(Italy) Max Papis	Arciero-Wells Racing	100	+45.600	18	1
13	8	(United States) Bryan Herta	Team Rahal	99	Spun off	4	
14	21	(Brazil) Tony Kanaan	Tasman Motorsports Group	99	+1 Lap	19	
15	36	(United States) Alex Barron	All American Racing	97	+3 Laps	27	
16	77	(West Germany) Arnd Meier	Davis Racing	97	+3 Laps	25	
17	2	(United States) Al Unser Jr.	Team Penske	96	Shift Linkage	9	
18	10	(United States) Richie Hearn	Della Penna Motorsports	96	+4 Laps	16	
19	26	(Canada) Paul Tracy	Team Green	94	Contact	5	
20	17	(Brazil) Maurício Gugelmin	PacWest Racing Group	85	Cooling	8	
21	98	(United States) P. J. Jones	All American Racing	74	Engine	26	
22	3	(Brazil) André Ribeiro	Team Penske	66	Transmission	24	
23	24	(United States) Robby Gordon	Arciero-Wells Racing	49	Electrical	20	
24	34	(United States) Dennis Vitolo	Payton/Coyne Racing	34	Transmission	28	
25	99	(Canada) Greg Moore	Forsythe Racing	3	Contact	12	
26	19	(Mexico) Michel Jourdain Jr.	Payton/Coyne Racing	3	Contact	22	
27	16	(Brazil) Hélio Castro-Neves	Bettenhausen Racing	3	Contact	23	
28	9	(Finland) JJ Lehto	Hogan Racing	3	Contact	21	

== Caution flags ==
Laps	Cause
4-10	Moore (99), Jourdain Jr. (19), Castro-Neves (16), Lehto (9) contact
26-29	Gugelmin (17) spin
67-71	Debris on track

== Lap Leaders ==
Laps	Leader
1-11	Jimmy Vasser
12-67	Alex Zanardi
68-88	Christian Fittipaldi
89-100	Alex Zanardi

Driver	Laps led
Alex Zanardi	68
Christian Fittipaldi	21
Jimmy Vasser	11

== Point standings after race ==
Pos	Driver	Points
1	(Italy) Alex Zanardi	155
2	(Canada) Greg Moore	97
3	(United States) Jimmy Vasser	92
4	(Mexico) Adrián Fernández	85
5	(United States) Michael Andretti	68
