= 1998 Budweiser/G.I. Joe's 200 =

(United States) 1998 Portland
Race details
- Race 9 of 19 in the 1998 CART season
- Portland International Raceway
- Date: June 21, 1998
- Official name: 1998 Budweiser/G.I. Joe's 200
- Location: Portland International Raceway; Portland, Oregon, United States
- Course: Permanent road course 1.967 mi / 3.17 km
- Distance: 98 laps 192.766 mi / 310.66 km
- Weather: Dry

Pole position
- Driver: (United States) Bryan Herta (Team Rahal)
- Time: 58.348

Fastest lap
- Driver: (Canada) Patrick Carpentier (Forsythe Racing)
- Time: 1:00.880 (on lap 89 of 98)

Podium
- First: (Italy) Alex Zanardi (Chip Ganassi Racing)
- Second: (United States) Scott Pruett (Patrick Racing)
- Third: (United States) Bryan Herta (Team Rahal)

The 1998 Budweiser/G.I. Joe's 200 was the ninth round of the 1998 CART FedEx Champ Car World Series season, held on June 21, 1998, on the Portland International Raceway in Portland, Oregon. Alex Zanardi was the winner of the race.

== Classification ==
=== Race ===
Pos	No	Driver	Team	Laps	Time/Retired	Grid	Points
1	1	(Italy) Alex Zanardi	Chip Ganassi Racing	98	1:54:06.822	5	20+1
2	20	(United States) Scott Pruett	Patrick Racing	98	+6.839	3	16
3	8	(United States) Bryan Herta	Team Rahal	98	+7.109	1	14+1
4	21	(Brazil) Tony Kanaan	Tasman Motorsports Group	98	+12.908	12	12
5	2	(United States) Al Unser Jr.	Team Penske	98	+14.176	18	10
6	7	(United States) Bobby Rahal	Team Rahal	98	+18.390	8	8
7	17	(Brazil) Maurício Gugelmin	PacWest Racing Group	98	+25.576	15	6
8	12	(United States) Jimmy Vasser	Chip Ganassi Racing	98	+27.026	4	5
9	33	(Canada) Patrick Carpentier	Forsythe Racing	98	+27.577	11	4
10	10	(United States) Richie Hearn	Della Penna Motorsports	97	+1 Lap	23	3
11	25	(Italy) Max Papis	Arciero-Wells Racing	97	+1 Lap	22	2
12	77	(West Germany) Arnd Meier	Davis Racing	97	+1 Lap	25	1
13	16	(Brazil) Hélio Castro-Neves	Bettenhausen Racing	97	+1 Lap	19	
14	36	(United States) Alex Barron	All American Racing	97	+1 Lap	27	
15	3	(Brazil) André Ribeiro	Team Penske	95	Transmission	17	
16	98	(United States) P. J. Jones	All American Racing	95	+3 Laps	26	
17	6	(United States) Michael Andretti	Newman-Haas Racing	95	+3 Laps	10	
18	34	(United States) Dennis Vitolo	Payton/Coyne Racing	94	+4 Laps	28	
19	19	(Mexico) Michel Jourdain Jr.	Payton/Coyne Racing	92	Oil Leak	13	
20	5	(Brazil) Gil de Ferran	Walker Racing	79	Contact	9	
21	27	(United Kingdom) Dario Franchitti	Team Green	71	Contact	2	
22	18	(United Kingdom) Mark Blundell	PacWest Racing Group	27	Contact	16	
23	24	(United States) Robby Gordon	Arciero-Wells Racing	17	Fuel pump	21	
24	40	(Mexico) Adrián Fernández	Patrick Racing	10	Contact	6	
25	9	(Finland) JJ Lehto	Hogan Racing	6	Exhaust	24	
26	11	(Brazil) Christian Fittipaldi	Newman-Haas Racing	0	Contact	7	
27	99	(Canada) Greg Moore	Forsythe Racing	0	Contact	14	
28	26	(Canada) Paul Tracy	Team Green	0	Contact	20	

== Caution flags ==
Laps	Cause
1-3	Multi-car collision
10-12	Vasser (12), Fernández (40) contact
14	Gordon (24) spin
73-78	Franchitti (27), Jones (98) contact

== Lap Leaders ==
Laps	Leader
1-13	Bryan Herta
14-35	Dario Franchitti
36	André Ribeiro
37-44	Al Unser Jr.
45-46	Bryan Herta
47-67	Alex Zanardi
68-72	Bryan Herta
73-98	Alex Zanardi

Driver	Laps led
Alex Zanardi	47
Dario Franchitti	22
Bryan Herta	20
Al Unser Jr.	8
André Ribeiro	1

== Point standings after race ==
Pos	Driver	Points
1	(Italy) Alex Zanardi	134
2	(Canada) Greg Moore	97
3	(United States) Jimmy Vasser	85
4	(Mexico) Adrián Fernández	75
5	(Brazil) Gil de Ferran	55
