= 1998 Marlboro Grand Prix of Miami =

(United States) 1998 Marlboro Miami
Race details
- Race 1 of 19 in the 1998 CART season
- Date: March 15, 1998
- Official name: Marlboro Grand Prix of Miami
- Location: Homestead-Miami Speedway, Homestead, Florida, United States
- Course: Permanent oval course 1.5 mi / 2.4 km
- Distance: 150 laps 225 mi / 360 km
- Weather: Temperatures reaching up to 77 °F (25 °C); wind speeds up to 13 miles per hour (21 km/h)

Pole position
- Driver: (Canada) Greg Moore (Forsythe Racing)
- Time: 24.856

Fastest lap
- Driver: (Canada) Greg Moore (Forsythe Racing)
- Time: 26.405 (on lap of 150)

Podium
- First: (United States) Michael Andretti (Newman/Haas Racing)
- Second: (Canada) Greg Moore (Forsythe Racing)
- Third: (Italy) Alex Zanardi (Chip Ganassi Racing)

The 1998 Marlboro Grand Prix of Miami was a CART race which happened at the Homestead-Miami Speedway. It happened on March 15, 1998. It was the 1st round of the 1998 CART season.

== Starting grid ==
1. Greg Moore 217.541 mph / 24.856 seconds (1st CART career pole)
2. André Ribeiro 214.665 mph
3. Jimmy Vasser
4. Christian Fittipaldi
5. Adrian Fernandez
6. Alex Zanardi
7. Mark Blundell
8. Michael Andretti
9. Patrick Carpentier
10. Maurício Gugelmin
11. Gil de Ferran
12. Scott Pruett
13. Dario Franchitti
14. Al Unser Jr.
15. Richie Hearn
16. Bryan Herta
17. Bobby Rahal
18. Tony Kanaan (R)
19. Michel Jourdain Jr.
20. Max Papis
21. Paul Tracy
22. Hélio Castroneves (R)
23. Roberto Moreno
24. Hiro Matsushita
25. Dennis Vitolo (Suffered an awful crash during practice. Suffered a broken finger, but raced.)
26. P. J. Jones
27. Alex Barron (R)
28. Arnd Meier
29. JJ Lehto (No speed due to gearbox problems)

== Race ==
=== Lap 27 ===
Top 6: Greg Moore, Alex Zanardi, Michael Andretti, Christian Fittipaldi, Gil de Ferran and Adrian Fernandez.

=== Lap 34 ===
First full course caution was out, as rookie Tony Kanaan had hit the wall in turn 4.

=== Lap 44 ===
Green flag. de Ferran leads.

=== Lap 57 ===
Top 6: Gil de Ferran, Michael Andretti, Alex Zanardi, Christian Fittipaldi, Patrick Carpentier and Scott Pruett.

=== Lap 67 ===
New leader: Michael Andretti!

=== Lap 75 ===
Second full course caution came out, as Paul Tracy "brushed" the wall in the backstretch.

=== Lap 82 ===
Green flag. de Ferran leads, but, laps later, he lost the lead, due to a pitstop.

=== Lap 97 ===
Top 6: Michael Andretti, Alex Zanardi, Gil de Ferran, Christian Fittipaldi, Dario Franchitti and Scott Pruett.

=== Lap 100 ===
Third full course caution, as another 1998 rookie had "brushed" the wall in turn 1: Hélio Castroneves.

=== Lap 107 ===
Green flag. Alex Zanardi leads.

=== Lap 116 ===
Fourth full course caution came out as Mark Blundell was another victim of the wall. This time in turn 2.

=== Lap 117 ===
Top 6: Andretti, Zanardi, Moore, Fittipaldi, Pruett and Fernandez.

=== Lap 122 ===
Green flag. Andretti once again was leading the race.

=== Lap 130 ===
Fifth full course caution: Hiro Matsushita had hit the wall in turn 2.

=== Lap 140 ===
Green flag. Andretti leads.

== Race results ==
Pos	No	Driver	Team	Laps	Time/Retired	Grid	Points
1	6	(United States) Michael Andretti	Newman-Haas Racing	150	1:33:39.268	8	20+1
2	99	(Canada) Greg Moore	Forsythe Racing	150	+0.075	1	16+1
3	1	(Italy) Alex Zanardi	Chip Ganassi Racing	150	+0.918	6	14
4	11	(Brazil) Christian Fittipaldi	Newman-Haas Racing	150	+3.359	4	12
5	20	(United States) Scott Pruett	Patrick Racing	150	+5.257	12	10
6	40	(Mexico) Adrián Fernández	Patrick Racing	150	+5.926	5	8
7	5	(Brazil) Gil de Ferran	Walker Racing	150	+6.810	11	6
8	8	(United States) Bryan Herta	Team Rahal	150	+9.866	16	5
9	27	(United Kingdom) Dario Franchitti	Team KOOL Green	150	+10.275	13	4
10	17	(Brazil) Maurício Gugelmin	PacWest Racing Group	150	+10.855	10	3
11	33	(Canada) Patrick Carpentier	Forsythe Racing	150	+11.382	9	2
12	18	(United Kingdom) Mark Blundell	PacWest Racing Group	150	+29.029	7	1
13	10	(United States) Richie Hearn	Della Penna Motorsports	149	+1 Lap	15	
14	9	(Finland) JJ Lehto	Hogan Racing	149	+1 Lap	29	
15	15	(Brazil) Roberto Moreno	Project Indy	149	+1 Lap	23	
16	12	(United States) Jimmy Vasser	Chip Ganassi Racing	148	+2 Laps	3	
17	3	(Brazil) André Ribeiro	Marlboro Team Penske	148	+2 Laps	2	
18	36	(United States) Alex Barron	All American Racing	148	+2 Laps	27	
19	7	(United States) Bobby Rahal	Team Rahal	147	+3 Laps	17	
20	98	(United States) P. J. Jones	All American Racing	146	+4 Laps	26	
21	77	(West Germany) Arnd Meier	Davis Racing	136	+14 Laps	28	
22	2	(United States) Al Unser Jr.	Marlboro Team Penske	122	Transmission	14	
23	24	(Japan) Hiro Matsushita	Arciero-Wells Racing	121	Contact	24	
24	16	(Brazil) Hélio Castro-Neves	Bettenhausen Racing	97	Contact	22	
25	34	(United States) Dennis Vitolo	Payton/Coyne Racing	90	Withdrew	25	
26	25	(Italy) Max Papis	Arciero-Wells Racing	83	Wheel Bearing	20	
27	26	(Canada) Paul Tracy	Team KOOL Green	79	Suspension	21	
28	19	(Mexico) Michel Jourdain Jr.	Payton/Coyne Racing	78	Handling	19	
29	21	(Brazil) Tony Kanaan	Tasman Motorsports Group	32	Contact	18	

=== Race statistics ===
Lap Leaders
Laps	Leader
1–36	Greg Moore
37-43	Alex Zanardi
44-65	Gil de Ferran
66-76	Michael Andretti
77-94	Gil de Ferran
95-102	Michael Andretti
103-107	Alex Zanardi
108-150	Michael Andretti

== Final results ==
Top 12

1. Michael Andretti 150 Laps
2. Greg Moore
3. Alex Zanardi
4. Christian Fittipaldi
5. Scott Pruett
6. Adrian Fernandez
7. Gil de Ferran
8. Bryan Herta
9. Dario Franchitti
10. Maurício Gugelmin
11. Patrick Carpentier
12. Mark Blundell

=== Drivers who did not completed the race ===
1. Al Unser Jr. +28 Transmission
2. Hiro Matsushita +29 Contact
3. Hélio Castroneves (R) +53 Contact
4. Dennis Vitolo +60 Withdrawn due to injury
5. Max Papis +67 Wheel bearing
6. Paul Tracy +71 Suspension
7. Michel Jourdain Jr. +72 Handling
8. Tony Kanaan (R) +118 Contact

== Point standings ==
Top 6

1. Andretti 21 points
2. Moore 17 points
3. Zanardi 14 points
4. Fittipaldi 12 points
5. Pruett 10 points
6. Fernandez 8 points

== Notes ==
1. (R) denotes contender for Rookie of the Year award
2. For this race, the Homestead-Miami Speedway was reconfigured for the third time in three years. In the summer of 1997, an $8.2 million reconfiguration project changed the turns from a rectangle to a traditional, continuous turn oval.
3. First pole: Greg Moore
