= 1998 Bosch Spark Plug Grand Prix =

(United States) 1998 Nazareth
Race details
- Race 4 of 19 in the 1998 CART season
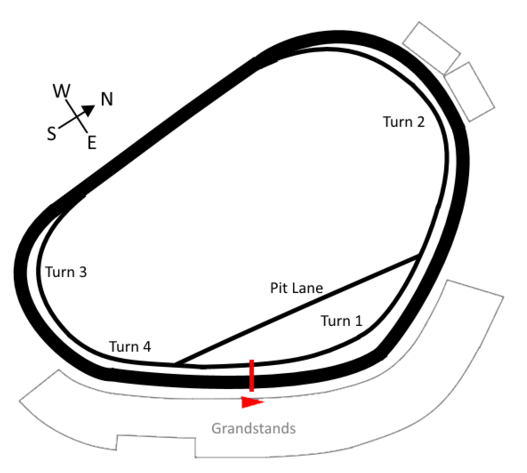
- Nazareth Speedway
- Date: April 27, 1998
- Official name: 1998 Bosch Spark Plug Grand Prix Presented by Toyota
- Location: Nazareth Speedway; Nazareth, Pennsylvania, United States
- Course: Permanent oval course 0.946 mi / 1.522 km
- Distance: 225 laps 212.85 mi / 342.45 km
- Weather: Dry

Pole position
- Driver: (Canada) Patrick Carpentier (Forsythe Racing)
- Time: 18.419

Fastest lap
- Driver: (Canada) Greg Moore (Forsythe Racing)
- Time: 19.514 (on lap 204 of 225)

Podium
- First: (United States) Jimmy Vasser (Chip Ganassi Racing)
- Second: (Italy) Alex Zanardi (Chip Ganassi Racing)
- Third: (Canada) Greg Moore (Forsythe Racing)

The 1998 Bosch Spark Plug Grand Prix Presented by Toyota was the fourth round of the 1998 CART FedEx Champ Car World Series season, in Nazareth, Pennsylvania. The race was won by Jimmy Vasser, his first win on an oval for nearly two years. Vasser won ahead of teammate and reigning champion Alex Zanardi, making it a 1-2 finish for Chip Ganassi Racing.

== Classification ==
=== Race ===
Pos	No	Driver	Team	Laps	Time/Retired	Grid	Points
1	12	(United States) Jimmy Vasser	Chip Ganassi Racing	225	1:57:20.307	5	20
2	1	(Italy) Alex Zanardi	Chip Ganassi Racing	225	+1.400	8	16
3	99	(Canada) Greg Moore	Forsythe Racing	225	+3.610	2	14
4	5	(Brazil) Gil de Ferran	Walker Racing	225	+6.016	4	12
5	26	(Canada) Paul Tracy	Team Green	225	+8.016	10	10
6	7	(United States) Bobby Rahal	Team Rahal	225	+9.618	9	8
7	24	(United States) Robby Gordon	Arciero-Wells Racing	225	+10.167	24	6
8	8	(United States) Bryan Herta	Team Rahal	224	+1 Lap	7	5
9	21	(Brazil) Tony Kanaan	Tasman Motorsports Group	224	+1 Lap	16	4
10	10	(United States) Richie Hearn	Della Penna Motorsports	224	+1 Lap	13	3
11	11	(Brazil) Christian Fittipaldi	Newman-Haas Racing	224	+1 Lap	6	2
12	19	(Mexico) Michel Jourdain Jr.	Payton/Coyne Racing	223	+2 Laps	23	1
13	33	(Canada) Patrick Carpentier	Forsythe Racing	222	+3 Laps	1	1
14	25	(Italy) Max Papis	Arciero-Wells Racing	221	+4 Laps	20	
15	2	(United States) Al Unser Jr.	Team Penske	220	+5 Laps	18	
16	9	(Finland) JJ Lehto	Hogan Racing	218	+7 Laps	15	
17	17	(Brazil) Maurício Gugelmin	PacWest Racing Group	206	Contact	14	
18	6	(United States) Michael Andretti	Newman-Haas Racing	122	Contact	3	1
19	98	(United States) P. J. Jones	All American Racing	107	Brakes	25	
20	18	(United Kingdom) Mark Blundell	PacWest Racing Group	107	Contact	21	
21	27	(United Kingdom) Dario Franchitti	Team Green	80	Contact	17	
22	20	(United States) Scott Pruett	Patrick Racing	68	Fire	12	
23	16	(Brazil) Hélio Castro-Neves	Bettenhausen Racing	62	Contact	19	
24	77	(West Germany) Arnd Meier	Davis Racing	28	Transmission	26	
25	34	(United States) Dennis Vitolo	Payton/Coyne Racing	10	Contact	22	
26	40	(Mexico) Adrián Fernández	Patrick Racing	0	Contact	11	
DNQ	36	(United States) Alex Barron	All American Racing		Did not Qualify		
DNQ	3	(Brazil) André Ribeiro	Team Penske		Did not Qualify		

== Caution flags ==
Laps	Cause
1-9	Fernández (40) contact
14-19	Vitolo (34) contact
63-78	Castro-Neves (16) contact
82-91	Franchitti (27) contact
109-122	Jones (98), Blundell (18) contact
123-132	Andretti (6) contact
207-219	Gugelmin (17) contact

== Lap Leaders ==
Laps	Leader
1-10	Patrick Carpentier
11-112	Michael Andretti
113-154	Bryan Herta
155-164	Jimmy Vasser
165-191	Alex Zanardi
192-194	Greg Moore
195-225	Jimmy Vasser

Driver	Laps led
Michael Andretti	102
Bryan Herta	42
Jimmy Vasser	41
Alex Zanardi	27
Patrick Carpentier	10
Greg Moore	3

== Point standings after race ==
Pos	Driver	Points
1	(Canada) Greg Moore	51
2	(Italy) Alex Zanardi	50
3	(Mexico) Adrián Fernández	41
4	(Brazil) Gil de Ferran	33
5	(United States) Jimmy Vasser	31
