= 1999 Honda Indy 300 =

Coordinates: 27°59′17.9″S 153°25′42.1″E

(Australia) 1999 Surfers Paradise
Race details
- Race 19 of 20 in the 1999 CART season
- Map of the track
- Date: 17 October, 1999
- Official name: Honda Indy 300
- Location: Surfers Paradise Street Circuit; Queensland, Australia
- Course: Temporary Street Circuit; 2.795 mi / 4.498 km
- Distance: 65 laps 181.675 mi / 292.370 km

Pole position
- Driver: (United Kingdom) Dario Franchitti (Team Green)
- Time: 1:31.703

Fastest lap
- Driver: (Italy) Max Papis (Team Rahal)
- Time: 1:34.516 (on lap 44 of 65)

Podium
- First: (United Kingdom) Dario Franchitti (Team Green)
- Second: (Italy) Max Papis (Team Rahal)
- Third: (Mexico) Adrián Fernández (Patrick Racing)

The 1999 Honda Indy 300 was the nineteenth and penultimate round of the 1999 CART season, held on 17 October 1999 on the Surfers Paradise Street Circuit, Surfers Paradise, Queensland, Australia.

== Qualifying results ==
Pos	Nat	Name	Team	Car	Time
1	(United Kingdom)	Dario Franchitti	Team Green	Reynard 99i Honda	1:31.703
2	(United States)	Bryan Herta	Team Rahal	Reynard 99i Ford XD	1:32.595
3	(United States)	Scott Pruett	Arciero-Wells Racing	Reynard 99i Toyota	1:32.616
4	(Canada)	Paul Tracy	Team Green	Reynard 99i Honda	1:32.700
5	(United States)	Michael Andretti	Newman-Haas Racing	Swift 010.c Ford XD	1:32.899
6	(Colombia)	Juan Pablo Montoya	Chip Ganassi Racing	Reynard 99i Honda	1:33.018
7	(Mexico)	Adrián Fernández	Patrick Racing	Reynard 99i Ford XD	1:33.072
8	(Brazil)	Tony Kanaan	Forsythe Championship Racing	Reynard 99i Honda	1:33.233
9	(Brazil)	Maurício Gugelmin	PacWest Racing	Reynard 99i Mercedes-Benz	1:33.271
10	(Brazil)	Cristiano da Matta	Arciero-Wells Racing	Reynard 99i Toyota	1:33.399
11	(Italy)	Max Papis	Team Rahal	Reynard 99i Ford XD	1:33.503
12	(Canada)	Greg Moore	Forsythe Championship Racing	Reynard 99i Mercedes-Benz	1:33.553
13	(Brazil)	Christian Fittipaldi	Newman-Haas Racing	Swift 010.c Ford XD	1:33.577
14	(Brazil)	Gil de Ferran	Walker Racing	Reynard 99i Honda	1:33.702
15	(Canada)	Patrick Carpentier	Forsythe Championship Racing	Reynard 99i Mercedes-Benz	1:33.781
16	(Brazil)	Hélio Castroneves	Hogan Racing	Lola B99/00 Mercedes-Benz	1:33.869
17	(United States)	Jimmy Vasser	Chip Ganassi Racing	Reynard 99i Honda	1:33.969
18	(Mexico)	Michel Jourdain Jr.	Payton/Coyne Racing	Lola B99/00 Ford XD	1:34.074
19	(Denmark)	Jan Magnussen	Patrick Racing	Reynard 99i Ford XD	1:34.099
20	(United Kingdom)	Mark Blundell	PacWest Racing	Reynard 99i Mercedes-Benz	1:34.243
21	(United States)	Memo Gidley	Payton/Coyne Racing	Reynard 99i Ford XD	1:34.309
22	(United States)	Robby Gordon	Team Gordon	Swift 010.c Toyota	1:34.627
23	(Japan)	Naoki Hattori	Walker Racing	Reynard 99i Honda	1:34.847
24	(United States)	Richie Hearn	Della Penna Motorsports	Reynard 99i Toyota	1:35.640
25	(Italy)	Andrea Montermini	All American Racers	Eagle 997 Toyota	1:36.101
26	(United States)	Al Unser Jr.	Team Penske	Penske PC27B-99 Mercedes	1:37.066
27	(Brazil)	Gualter Salles	Bettenhausen Motorsports	Reynard 99i Mercedes	1:37.677

== Race ==
Pos	No	Driver	Team	Laps	Time/retired	Grid	Points
1	27	(United Kingdom) Dario Franchitti	Team Green	65	1:58:40.726	1	22
2	7	(Italy) Max Papis	Team Rahal	65	+2.6 secs	11	16
3	40	(Mexico) Adrián Fernández	Patrick Racing	65	+7.4 secs	7	14
4	8	(United States) Bryan Herta	Team Rahal	65	+10.4 secs	2	12
5	6	(United States) Michael Andretti	Newman-Haas Racing	65	+10.4 secs	5	10
6	44	(Brazil) Tony Kanaan	Forsythe Championship Racing	65	+11.4 secs	8	8
7	26	(Canada) Paul Tracy	Team Green	65	+11.7 secs	4	6
8	22	(United States) Robby Gordon	Team Gordon	65	+19.9 secs	22	5
9	24	(United States) Scott Pruett	Arciero-Wells Racing	65	+21.3 secs	3	4
10	16	(Brazil) Gualter Salles	Bettenhausen Motorsports	65	+26.1 secs	27	3
11	20	(Denmark) Jan Magnussen	Patrick Racing	65	+30.7 secs	19	2
12	19	(Mexico) Michel Jourdain Jr.	Payton/Coyne Racing	65	+33.0 secs	18	1
13	25	(Brazil) Cristiano da Matta	Arciero-Wells Racing	63	Mechanical	10	
14	71	(United States) Memo Gidley	Payton/Coyne Racing	60	Mechanical	21	
15	36	(Italy) Andrea Montermini	All American Racers	60	Mechanical	19	
16	4	(Colombia) Juan Pablo Montoya	Chip Ganassi Racing	48	Contact	6	
17	99	(Canada) Greg Moore	Forsythe Championship Racing	46	Mechanical	12	
18	12	(United States) Jimmy Vasser	Chip Ganassi Racing	44	Mechanical	17	
19	18	(United Kingdom) Mark Blundell	PacWest Racing	33	Contact	23	
20	15	(Japan) Naoki Hattori	Walker Racing	33	Contact	20	
21	9	(Brazil) Hélio Castroneves	Hogan Racing	28	Mechanical	16	
22	2	(United States) Al Unser Jr.	Team Penske	22	Mechanical	26	
23	10	(United States) Richie Hearn	Della Penna Motorsports	21	Mechanical	24	
24	33	(Canada) Patrick Carpentier	Forsythe Championship Racing	20	Contact	15	
25	11	(Brazil) Christian Fittipaldi	Newman-Haas Racing	3	Fire	13	
26	17	(Brazil) Maurício Gugelmin	PacWest Racing	1	Mechanical	9	
27	5	(Brazil) Gil de Ferran	Walker Racing	0	Contact	14	

== Notes ==
- Average Speed 91.849 mph

Previous race: 1999 Texaco Grand Prix of Houston	CART FedEx Championship Series; 1999 season	Next race: 1999 Marlboro 500
Previous race: 1998 Honda Indy 300	Honda Indy 300	Next race: 2000 Honda Indy 300
