= 1996 Grand Prix of Long Beach =

(United States) 1996 Grand Prix of Long Beach
Race details
- Race 4 of 16 in the 1996 IndyCar season
- Date: April 14, 1996
- Official name: Toyota Grand Prix of Long Beach
- Location: Long Beach Street Circuit, California, United States
- Course: Street; 1.586 mi / 2.552 km
- Distance: 105 laps 166.530 mi / 268.004 km
- Weather: Temperatures up to 94 °F (34 °C); wind speeds up to 12 miles per hour (19 km/h)

Pole position
- Driver: (Brazil) Gil de Ferran (Hall Racing)
- Time: 0:52.208

Fastest lap
- Driver: (Canada) Paul Tracy (Penske Racing)
- Time: 0:53.482 (on lap 99 of 105)

Podium
- First: (United States) Jimmy Vasser (Chip Ganassi Racing)
- Second: (United States) Parker Johnstone (Comptech Racing)
- Third: (United States) Al Unser Jr. (Penske Racing)

Chronology
Previous	Next
1995	1997

The 1996 Toyota Grand Prix of Long Beach was the 4th round of the 1996 IndyCar season. It happened on April 14, 1996, on Long Beach Street Circuit.

== Race ==
=== Start ===
At the end of lap 1, de Ferran was leading the race, as he led most laps of the race.

=== Laps 4–39 ===
At lap 4, Brazilian driver André Ribeiro crashed at turn 1. He retired. At lap 14, the top 6 was: Gil de Ferran, Alex Zanardi, Jimmy Vasser, Scott Pruett, Paul Tracy and Parker Johnstone. The 1st caution came out at lap 39, as Zanardi had hit Bobby Rahal at turn 1. Zanardi retired. At the same lap, Robby Gordon had a fire in his pit area. Despite this, Robby did not retire.

=== Laps 41–65 ===
The top 6 at lap 41 was: de Ferran, Vasser, Tracy, Johnstone, Pruett and Greg Moore. At lap 49, the 2nd caution came out, as Moore collided with Christian Fittipaldi at the last turn before the hairpin. Both retired. Emerson Fittipaldi had hit some debris from that collision, thus, damaging the suspension of his car. He also retired. Al Unser Jr. was now in sixth place. Then, at lap 54, Raul Boesel committed a mistake and missed the turn 1. He would do this again laps later. At lap 57, Robby Gordon had hit Bryan Herta at the hairpin. They did not retired. At lap 65, Teo Fabi, who was replacing Mark Blundell, after he suffered a broken foot at the Rio 400, suffered a puncture. The cause of the puncture, probably, was when he collided with Michael Andretti at the opening laps. Andretti had hit Fabi from behind and damaged his front wing.

=== Laps 70–95 ===
The 3rd caution came out, as Robby Gordon had hit the wall. The top 10 was: de Ferran, Tracy, Vasser, Johnstone, Unser Jr., Adrian Fernandez, Andretti, Roberto Moreno, Eddie Lawson and Richie Hearn. At the same lap, Paul Tracy was black flagged after overtaking Vasser during caution. He did a stop-and-go penalty one lap later. At lap 95, Dennis Vitolo retired due to mechanical problems

=== Closing stages ===
With 4 laps to go, de Ferran suffered mechanical problems and lost the lead to Jimmy Vasser. Then, 1 lap later, Bobby Rahal and Bryan Herta collided at the hairpin. Jimmy Vasser won the race.

=== Final results ===
Pos	No	Driver	Team	Laps	Time/Retired	Grid	Points
1	12	(United States) Jimmy Vasser	Chip Ganassi Racing	105	1:44:02.363	3	20
2	49	(United States) Parker Johnstone	Comptech Racing	105	+ 3.447	6	16
3	2	(United States) Al Unser Jr.	Penske Racing	105	+ 4.409	9	14
4	3	(Canada) Paul Tracy	Penske Racing	105	+ 5.000	4	12
5	8	(Brazil) Gil de Ferran	Jim Hall Racing	105	+ 32.073	1	12
6	32	(Mexico) Adrián Fernández	Tasman Motorsports	105	+ 36.322	13	8
7	6	(United States) Michael Andretti	Newman/Haas Racing	104	+ 1 Lap	12	6
8	34	(Brazil) Roberto Moreno	Payton/Coyne Racing	104	+ 1 Lap	18	5
9	10	(United States) Eddie Lawson	Galles Racing International	104	+ 1 Lap	24	4
10	44	(United States) Richie Hearn	Della Penna Motorsports	103	+ 2 Laps	22	3
11	20	(United States) Scott Pruett	Patrick Racing	103	+ 2 Laps	5	2
12	28	(United States) Bryan Herta	Team Rahal	100	+ 5 Laps	17	1
13	5	(United States) Robby Gordon	Walker Racing	98	+ 7 Laps	7	
14	18	(United States) Bobby Rahal	Team Rahal	98	+ 7 Laps	21	
15	17	(Brazil) Maurício Gugelmin	PacWest Racing	97	+ 8 Laps	11	
16	1	(Brazil) Raul Boesel	Team Green	90	+ 15 Laps	16	
17	64	(United States) Dennis Vitolo	Project Indy	87	Electrical	28	
18	21	(Italy) Teo Fabi	PacWest Racing	86	Clutch	19	
19	16	(Sweden) Stefan Johansson	Bettenhausen Racing	50	Engine	20	
20	9	(Brazil) Emerson Fittipaldi	Hogan-Penske Racing	48	Accident	14	
21	11	(Brazil) Christian Fittipaldi	Newman/Haas Racing	47	Accident	10	
22	99	(Canada) Greg Moore	Team Forsythe	47	Accident	8	
23	22	(Mexico) Michel Jourdain Jr.	Team Scandia	46	Radiator	27	
24	4	(Italy) Alex Zanardi	Chip Ganassi Racing	39	Accident	2	
25	36	(Argentina) Juan Fangio II	All American Racers	29	Oil leak	26	
26	25	(United States) Jeff Krosnoff	Arciero/Wells Racing	23	Engine	23	
27	31	(Brazil) André Ribeiro	Tasman Motorsports	4	Accident	15	
28	19	(Japan) Hiro Matsushita	Payton/Coyne Racing	1	Electrical	25	

=== Race statistics ===
Lap Leaders
Laps	Leader
1-38	Gil de Ferran
39	Alex Zanardi
40-101	Gil de Ferran
102-105	Jimmy Vasser

Preceded by 1995 Grand Prix of Long Beach	Grand Prix of Long Beach	Succeeded by 1997 Grand Prix of Long Beach
