= IROC XXIII =

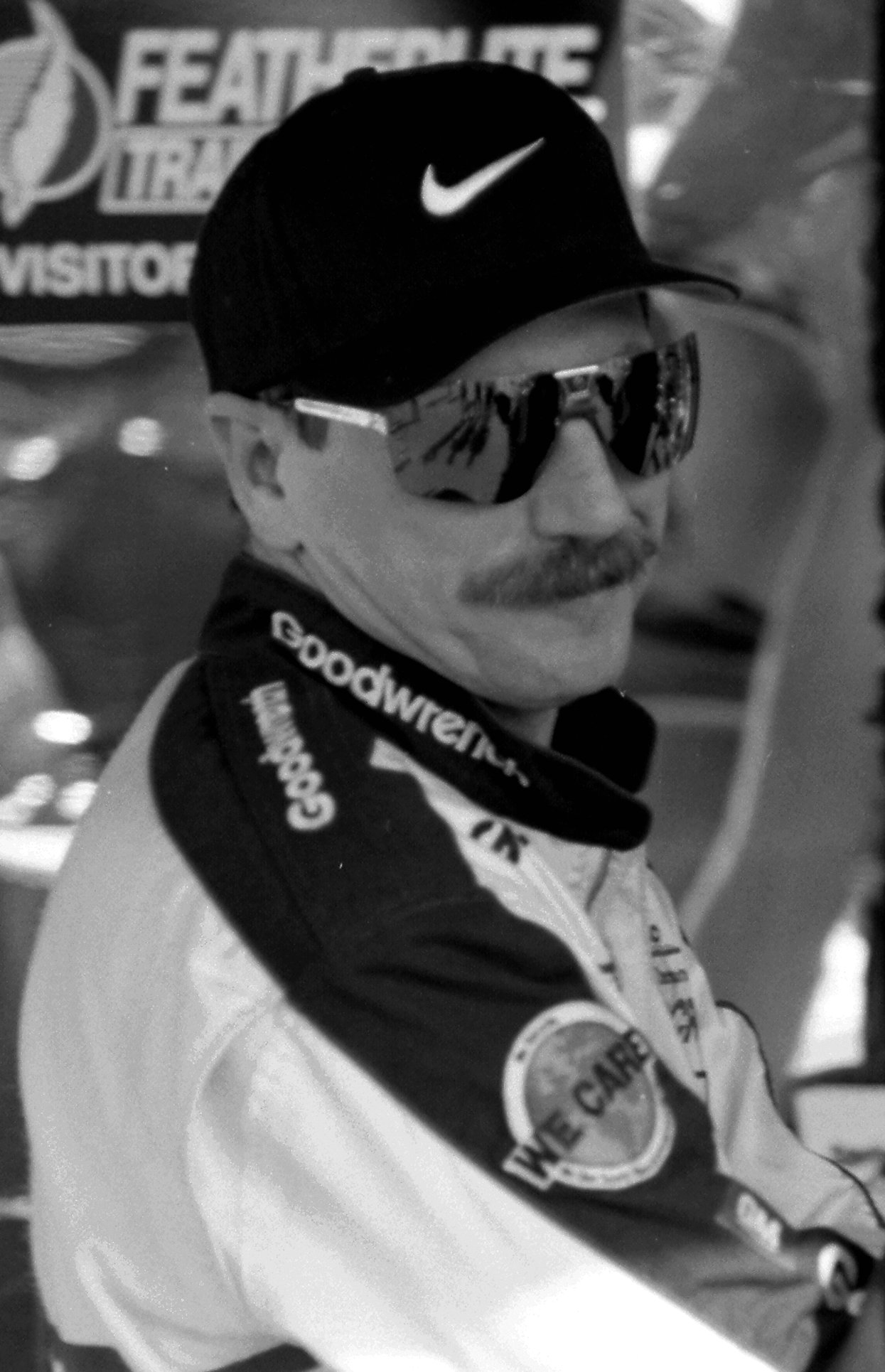
Dale Earnhardt (seen in 1997), the IROC XXIII champion

IROC XXIII was the twenty-third season of IROC, the (International Race Of Champions), which started on February 12, 1999. The series used identically prepared Pontiac Firebird Trans Am race cars, and the contested races were held at Daytona International Speedway, Talladega Superspeedway, Michigan International Speedway, and Indianapolis Motor Speedway. Dale Earnhardt won the first three races of the season, including two last lap passes at Daytona and Talladega, and beating his son Dale Earnhardt Jr. at Michigan in a photo finish, to win the championship and $225,000.

The roster of drivers and final points standings were as follows:

Position	Driver	Points	Winnings	Series
1	(United States) Dale Earnhardt	75	$225,000	NASCAR Winston Cup
2	(United States) Mark Martin	74	$100,000	NASCAR Winston Cup
3	(United States) Bobby Labonte	53	$60,000	NASCAR Winston Cup
4	(United States) Rusty Wallace	50	$50,000	NASCAR Winston Cup
5	(United States) Jeff Gordon	49	$45,000	NASCAR Winston Cup
6	(Sweden) Kenny Bräck	34	$40,000	Indy Racing League
7	(United States) Eddie Cheever	31	$40,000	Indy Racing League
8	(United States) Dale Jarrett	30	$40,000	NASCAR Winston Cup
9	(United States) Dale Earnhardt Jr.	29	$40,000	NASCAR Busch Series
10	(Mexico) Adrian Fernandez^{1}	28	$40,000	FedEx CART World Series
11	(United States) Jeff Burton	26	$40,000	NASCAR Winston Cup
12	(Canada) Greg Moore	25	$40,000	FedEx CART World Series

== Race results ==
=== Daytona International Speedway, Race One ===
1. Dale Earnhardt
2. Bobby Labonte
3. Mark Martin
4. Kenny Bräck
5. Greg Moore
6. Jeff Gordon
7. Adrian Fernandez
8. Dale Jarrett
9. Rusty Wallace
10. Dale Earnhardt Jr.
11. Eddie Cheever
12. Jeff Burton

=== Talladega Superspeedway, Race Two ===
1. Dale Earnhardt
2. Rusty Wallace
3. Mark Martin
4. Jeff Gordon
5. Kenny Bräck
6. Adrian Fernandez
7. Bobby Labonte
8. Eddie Cheever
9. Greg Moore
10. Dale Jarrett
11. Jeff Burton
12. Dale Earnhardt Jr.

=== Michigan International Speedway, Race Three ===
1. Dale Earnhardt
2. Dale Earnhardt Jr.
3. Rusty Wallace
4. Bobby Labonte
5. Mark Martin
6. Jeff Burton
7. Jeff Gordon
8. Kenny Bräck
9. Greg Moore
10. Adrian Fernandez
11. Dale Jarrett
12. Eddie Cheever

=== Indianapolis Motor Speedway, Race Four ===
1. Mark Martin
2. Jeff Gordon
3. Eddie Cheever
4. Bobby Labonte
5. Rusty Wallace
6. Dale Jarrett
7. Jeff Burton
8. Dale Earnhardt
9. Dave Marcis *
10. Kenny Bräck
11. Dale Earnhardt Jr.
12. Greg Moore

== Notes ==
- 1. Dave Marcis drove for Adrian Fernandez in the last race in Indianapolis.
