= 1998 Rio 400 =

(Brazil) 1998 Rio 400
Race details
- Race 5 of 19 in the 1998 CART season
- Date: May 10, 1998
- Official name: Rio 400
- Location: Emerson Fittipaldi Speedway, Rio de Janeiro, Brazil
- Course: Permanent racing facility 1.864 mi / 3.000 km
- Distance: 133 laps 247.912 mi / 398.976 km

Pole position
- Driver: (United Kingdom) Dario Franchitti (Team KOOL Green)
- Time: 39.005

Fastest lap
- Driver: (Italy) Alex Zanardi (Chip Ganassi Racing)
- Time: 39.328 (on lap 131 of 133)

Podium
- First: (Canada) Greg Moore (Forsythe Racing)
- Second: (Italy) Alex Zanardi (Chip Ganassi Racing)
- Third: (Mexico) Adrian Fernández (Patrick Racing)

The 1998 Rio 400 was the fifth round of the 1998 CART World Series Season, held on May 10, 1998, on the Autódromo Internacional Nelson Piquet, Rio de Janeiro, Brazil.

== Qualifying ==
The Scottish driver Dario Franchitti, from Team Green set the pole.

== Race ==
At the start, the Italian driver Alex Zanardi, from Chip Ganassi Racing took the lead. At lap 19, fellow Italian driver Max Papis, from Arciero-Wells Racing retired due to a broken engine. After 21 laps, the top six was: Alex Zanardi, Gil de Ferran, Dario Franchitti, Tony Kanaan, Christian Fittipaldi and Michael Andretti. At lap 30, Kanaan, from Tasman Motorsports, retired due to an engine fire, bringing out the first caution of the race. The lead lap cars went to pit stop at the same lap. Newman-Haas Racing driver Michael Andretti hit a tire in the pits, then he suffered a penalty. The restart came out at lap 37. A few laps later, Team Green driver Paul Tracy was hit by Gil de Ferran, from Walker Racing. 2nd caution. The restart was out at lap 47. Lap 54, the Mexican driver Michel Jourdain Jr., from Payton/Coyne Racing hit the wall, bringing out the third caution. The restart came out at lap 60. Michael Andretti did an overtaking show. He was one lap down in 24th. After some laps, he was in sixth.

With 65 laps to go, Zanardi, Bryan Herta, Adrian Fernández and Greg Moore did their pit stops during green flag. At that time, Fittipaldi, André Ribeiro and Hélio Castroneves were out of the race. Only two Brazilian drivers were in the race at that moment: Maurício Gugelmin and Gualter Salles. At lap 91, Salles retired due to a crash at turn one, bringing out the fourth caution. At the same lap, polesitter Dario Franchitti retired due an engine issue. The restart happened at lap 98. After this lap, Scott Pruett, from Patrick Racing, retired. Player's Forsythe Racing driver Patrick Carpentier, suffered a tire problem at lap 102, and retired. At lap 108, the top 10 was: Zanardi, Moore, Fernandez, Richie Hearn, Herta, Jimmy Vasser, Al Unser Jr., Andretti, Bobby Rahal and Mark Blundell. From lap 116-onwards, the battle for the win was between the Italian Alex Zanardi and the Canadian Greg Moore. At lap 120, Moore almost lost the control of his car, after he went sideways at turn four. With five laps to go, Moore did an amazing overtake manoeuvre on Zanardi, and took the lead. The German driver Arnd Meier, was in front of both. Moore won the race, his first win of the season, the third win of his Champ Car career.

== Classification ==
=== Race ===
Pos	No	Driver	Team	Laps	Time/Retired	Grid	Points
1	99	(Canada) Greg Moore	Forsythe Racing	133	1:52:14.135	7	20
2	1	(Italy) Alex Zanardi	Chip Ganassi Racing	133	+0.427	2	16+1
3	40	(Mexico) Adrián Fernández	Patrick Racing	133	+4.839	12	14
4	8	(United States) Bryan Herta	Team Rahal	133	+12.951	6	12
5	6	(United States) Michael Andretti	Newman-Haas Racing	133	+14.324	8	10
6	12	(United States) Jimmy Vasser	Chip Ganassi Racing	133	+15.251	13	8
7	10	(United States) Richie Hearn	Della Penna Motorsports	133	+15.799	28	6
8	7	(United States) Bobby Rahal	Team Rahal	133	+28.649	10	5
9	17	(Brazil) Maurício Gugelmin	PacWest Racing Group	132	+1 Lap	21	4
10	9	(Finland) JJ Lehto	Hogan Racing	132	+1 Lap	22	3
11	18	(United Kingdom) Mark Blundell	PacWest Racing Group	132	+1 Lap	18	2
12	36	(United States) Alex Barron	All American Racing	131	+2 Laps	24	1
13	98	(United States) P. J. Jones	All American Racing	130	+3 Laps	23	
14	77	(West Germany) Arnd Meier	Davis Racing	130	+3 Laps	19	
15	24	(Japan) Hiro Matsushita	Arciero-Wells Racing	129	+4 Laps	26	
16	2	(United States) Al Unser Jr.	Team Penske	118	Engine	27	
17	33	(Canada) Patrick Carpentier	Forsythe Racing	106	Handling	17	
18	20	(United States) Scott Pruett	Patrick Racing	98	Transmission	15	
19	27	(United Kingdom) Dario Franchitti	Team Green	90	Electrical	1	1
20	34	(Brazil) Gualter Salles	Payton/Coyne Racing	89	Contact	14	
21	11	(Brazil) Christian Fittipaldi	Newman-Haas Racing	78	Fuel system	5	
22	3	(Brazil) André Ribeiro	Team Penske	76	Transmission	16	
23	16	(Brazil) Hélio Castro-Neves	Bettenhausen Racing	54	Engine	11	
24	19	(Mexico) Michel Jourdain Jr.	Payton/Coyne Racing	53	Contact	25	
25	26	(Canada) Paul Tracy	Team Green	39	Contact	9	
26	5	(Brazil) Gil de Ferran	Walker Racing	39	Contact	4	
27	21	(Brazil) Tony Kanaan	Tasman Motorsports Group	28	Engine	3	
28	25	(Italy) Max Papis	Arciero-Wells Racing	17	Engine	20	

== Caution flags ==
Laps	Cause
29-35	Kanaan (21) engine blow-up
39-45	Tracy (26), de Ferran (5) contact
54-58	Jourdain Jr. (19) contact
90-96	Salles (34) contact

== Lap Leaders ==
Laps	Leader
1-77	Alex Zanardi
78-81	Richie Hearn
82-88	Dario Franchitti
89-128	Alex Zanardi
129-133	Greg Moore

Driver	Laps led
Alex Zanardi	117
Dario Franchitti	7
Greg Moore	5
Richie Hearn	4

== Point standings after race ==
Pos	Driver	Points
1	(Canada) Greg Moore	71
2	(Italy) Alex Zanardi	67
3	(Mexico) Adrián Fernández	55
4	(United States) Jimmy Vasser	39
5	(United States) Bryan Herta	37
