= 1998 Texaco Grand Prix of Houston =

(United States) 1998 Houston
Race details
- Race 17 of 19 in the 1998 CART season
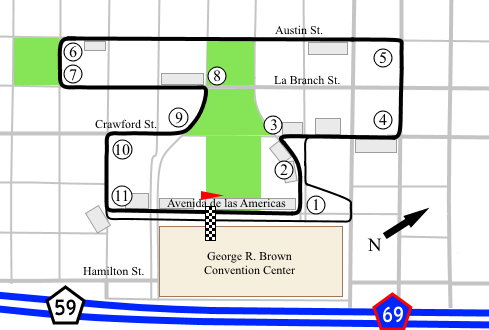
- Original track layout of the Houston Grand Prix.
- Date: October 4, 1998
- Official name: 1998 Texaco Grand Prix of Houston
- Location: George R. Brown Convention Center; Houston, Texas, United States
- Course: Temporary street course 1.527 mi / 2.457 km
- Distance: 70 laps 106.89 mi / 171.99 km
- Weather: Heavy rain

Pole position
- Driver: (Canada) Greg Moore (Forsythe Racing)
- Time: 59.508

Fastest lap
- Driver: (Italy) Alex Zanardi (Chip Ganassi Racing)
- Time: 1:02.797 (on lap 59 of 70)

Podium
- First: (United Kingdom) Dario Franchitti (Team KOOL Green)
- Second: (Italy) Alex Zanardi (Chip Ganassi Racing)
- Third: (Brazil) Tony Kanaan (Tasman Motorsports Group)

The 1998 Texaco Grand Prix of Houston was the seventeenth round of the 1998 CART FedEx Champ Car World Series season, held on October 4, 1998, at a street adjacent to the George R. Brown Convention Center in Houston, Texas. The race was a rain-interrupted race, with the start being delayed 30 minutes due to heavy rain. Another heavy rainshower after 70 laps out of the scheduled 100 forced the race to be stopped, with the win handed to Dario Franchitti, who was leading at the time.

The race was the scene of an infamous Lap 48 collision between winner Franchitti and his Team KOOL Green teammate, Paul Tracy. While running second, Tracy attempted to pass Franchitti on the inside going into the left-handed Turn 6; however, Franchitti was already making the turn, leading to the teammates touching, and Tracy spinning, brushing the inside wall enough to bend his left front suspension, ending his race. This led to a terse conversation over the radio between Tracy and team owner Barry Green. When Tracy returned to pit road, he and Green nearly came to blows in plain view of television cameras and the crowd on the start-finish straight. Ironically, within days of their near fistfight, Tracy and Green agreed to a four-year contract extension.

== Classification ==
=== Race ===
Pos	No	Driver	Team	Laps	Time/Retired	Grid	Points
1	27	(United Kingdom) Dario Franchitti	Team Green	70	1:36:30.979	2	20+1
2	1	(Italy) Alex Zanardi	Chip Ganassi Racing	70	+0.646	8	16
3	21	(Brazil) Tony Kanaan	Tasman Motorsports Group	70	+5.792	11	14
4	12	(United States) Jimmy Vasser	Chip Ganassi Racing	70	+8.342	3	12
5	25	(Italy) Max Papis	Arciero-Wells Racing	70	+11.170	14	10
6	40	(Mexico) Adrián Fernández	Patrick Racing	70	+13.425	12	8
7	2	(United States) Al Unser Jr.	Team Penske	70	+17.725	16	6
8	8	(United States) Bryan Herta	Team Rahal	70	+26.906	6	5
9	10	(United States) Richie Hearn	Della Penna Motorsports	70	+27.812	18	4
10	9	(Finland) JJ Lehto	Hogan Racing	70	+35.089	21	3
11	20	(United States) Scott Pruett	Patrick Racing	69	+1 Lap	19	2
12	36	(United States) Alex Barron	All American Racing	69	+1 Lap	20	1
13	24	(United States) Robby Gordon	Arciero-Wells Racing	69	+1 Lap	24	
14	18	(United Kingdom) Mark Blundell	PacWest Racing Group	68	+2 Laps	22	
15	98	(Italy) Vincenzo Sospiri	All American Racing	68	+2 Laps	28	
16	77	(West Germany) Arnd Meier	Davis Racing	68	+2 Laps	26	
17	3	(Brazil) André Ribeiro	Team Penske	66	+4 Laps	10	
18	17	(Brazil) Maurício Gugelmin	PacWest Racing Group	52	Electrical	16	
19	34	(United States) Dennis Vitolo	Payton/Coyne Racing	49	Electrical	27	
20	26	(Canada) Paul Tracy	Team Green	48	Contact	4	
21	5	(Brazil) Gil de Ferran	Walker Racing	38	Spun off	7	
22	33	(Canada) Patrick Carpentier	Forsythe Racing	36	Contact	25	
23	7	(United States) Bobby Rahal	Team Rahal	35	Suspension	9	
24	16	(Brazil) Hélio Castro-Neves	Bettenhausen Racing	35	Suspension	17	
25	19	(Mexico) Michel Jourdain Jr.	Payton/Coyne Racing	13	Contact	23	
26	99	(Canada) Greg Moore	Forsythe Racing	3	Contact	1	1
27	11	(Brazil) Christian Fittipaldi	Newman-Haas Racing	3	Contact	5	
28	6	(United States) Michael Andretti	Newman-Haas Racing	2	Steering	13	

== Caution flags ==
Laps	Cause
1-3	Multiple cars spinning due to rain
5-9	Moore (99), Fittipaldi (11) contact
14-16	Jourdain Jr. (19), Gordon (24) contact, road block. Later red-flagged.
39-43	Carpentier (33) contact
46	Vitolo (34) contact
68-70	Heavy rain

== Lap Leaders ==
Laps / Leader; 1-70 / Dario Franchitti	Driver / Laps led; Dario Franchitti / 70

== Point standings after race ==
Pos	Driver	Points
1	(Italy) Alex Zanardi	250
2	(United States) Jimmy Vasser	148
3	(United Kingdom) Dario Franchitti	143
4	(Mexico) Adrián Fernández	134
5	(Canada) Greg Moore	120
