= Tasman Motorsports =

Tasman Motorsports Group is a former racing team that was owned by Steve Horne, a long-time motorsport figure who spent most of his career in the United States.

Previously the team was an American-based open-wheel racing team that competed in the Indy Lights series and, most notably, the CART series from 1995 to 1998. Tasman was one of the first teams to successfully field a Honda powered entry. Honda had entered CART the prior year with Rahal-Hogan Racing, with very little success.

In the team's first and only Indianapolis 500 in 1995, Tasman driver Scott Goodyear led the race with 10 laps to go, but was subsequently black-flagged for passing the pace car while it was still on the track at the end of a caution period and relegated to 14th place. André Ribeiro captured the team's first win and Honda's first in CART later that season at the New Hampshire International Speedway.

The following season, Ribeiro won a pair of races and teammate Adrian Fernández won once. They finished eleventh and twelfth in points respectively. However, in 1997, the team's Lola chassis were clearly off the pace and Ribeiro switched to Reynards midway through the season.

The team pared back to a single car in 1998 and hired rookie Tony Kanaan — who captured the Indy Lights championship for Tasman the previous season — to drive. Kanaan finished ninth in points with a best finish of third, winning the Jim Trueman Rookie of the Year award. However, the team lost its LCI sponsorship and 1998 would be its last season in the US.

== Former CART drivers ==
- (Mexico) Adrian Fernández (1996–1997)
- (Canada) Scott Goodyear (1995)
- (Brazil) Tony Kanaan (1998)
- (Brazil) André Ribeiro (1995–1997)

== Racing results ==
=== CART FedEx Championship Series results ===
(key) (results in bold indicate pole position) (results in italics indicate fastest lap)

Year	Chassis	Engine	Tyres	Drivers	No.	1	2	3	4	5	6	7	8	9	10	11	12	13	14	15	16	17	18	19	Pts Pos	Pts
1995						MIA	SFR	PHX	LBH	NAZ	INDY	MIL	DET	POR	ROA	TOR	CLE	MCH	MDO	NHA	VAN	LAG				
1995	Reynard 95i	Honda HRX V8t; Honda HRH V8t	F	(Canada) Scott Goodyear	24						14								12		14				32nd	1
1995	Reynard 95i	Honda HRX V8t; Honda HRH V8t	F	(Brazil) André Ribeiro	31	21	23	26	12	11	18	25	18	14	4	13	27	21*	27	**1***	23	26			17th	38
1996						MIA	RIO	SFR	LBH	NAZ	500	MIL	DET	POR	CLE	TOR	MCH	MDO	ROA	VAN	LAG					
1996	Lola T96/00	Honda HRH V8t	F	(Brazil) André Ribeiro	31	16	1	8	27	12	4	8	24	7	20	**21**	1*	8	19	21	19				11th	76
1996	Lola T96/00	Honda HRH V8t	F	(Mexico) Adrián Fernández	32	11	14	23	6	10	DNS	11	4	12	6	1	20	6	13	8	11				12th	71
1997						MIA	SFR	LBH	NAZ	RIO	GAT	MIL	DET	POR	CLE	TOR	MCH	MDO	ROA	VAN	LAG	FON				
1997	Lola T97/00; Reynard 97i	Honda HRR V8t	F	(Brazil) André Ribeiro	31	12	6	14	26	15	10	26	25	13	14	3	23	10	22	10	4	17*			14th	45
1997	Lola T97/00; Reynard 97i	Honda HRR V8t	F	(Mexico) Adrián Fernández	32	13	11	11	23	26	8	24	27	10	17	14	26	23	12	19	23	3			18th	27
1998						MIA	MOT	LBH	NAZ	RIO	GAT	MIL	DET	POR	CLE	TOR	MCH	MDO	ROA	VAN	LAG	HOU	SFR	FON		
1998	Reynard 98i	Honda HRK V8t	F	(Brazil) Tony Kanaan	21	18	6	5	9	27	24	17	8	4	14	22	11	8	4	18	3	3	7	19	9th	92
