= 1995 Indycar Australia =

Coordinates: 27°59′17.9″S 153°25′42.1″E

(Australia) 1995 Surfers Paradise
Race details
- Race 2 of 17 in the 1995 IndyCar season
- Map of the track
- Date: 19 March, 1995
- Official name: 1995 Gold Coast Indy
- Location: Surfers Paradise Street Circuit; Queensland, Australia
- Course: Temporary Street Circuit; 2.794 mi / 4.496 km
- Distance: 65 laps 181.610 mi / 292.240 km

Pole position
- Driver: (United States) Michael Andretti (Newman-Haas Racing)
- Time: 1:36.770

Fastest lap
- Driver: (United States) Michael Andretti (Newman-Haas Racing)
- Time: 1:37.564 (on lap 40 of 65)

Podium
- First: (Canada) Paul Tracy (Newman-Haas Racing)
- Second: (United States) Bobby Rahal (Rahal/Hogan Racing)
- Third: (United States) Scott Pruett (Patrick Racing)

The 1995 Indycar Australia was the second round of the 1995 CART World Series season, held on 19 March 1995 on the Surfers Paradise Street Circuit, Surfers Paradise, Queensland, Australia.

This event was the first sporting event carried live on the Internet - by Brisbane-based Interactive Presentations - the archived live coverage can be seen at this link.

The winner was Paul Tracy.

== Qualifying results ==
Pos	Nat	Name	Team	Car	Time
1	(United States)	Michael Andretti	Newman-Haas Racing	Lola T95/00 Ford XB Cosworth	1:36.770
2	(Canada)	Jacques Villeneuve	Team Green	Reynard 95I Ford XB Cosworth	1:36.908
3	(United States)	Al Unser Jr.	Team Penske	Penske PC24-95 Mercedes-Benz	1:36.975
4	(Brazil)	Emerson Fittipaldi	Team Penske	Penske PC24-95 Mercedes-Benz	1:37.097
5	(Italy)	Teo Fabi	Forsythe Racing	Reynard 95I Ford XB Cosworth	1:37.135
6	(Brazil)	Gil de Ferran	Jim Hall Racing	Reynard 95I Mercedes-Benz	1:37.343
7	(Sweden)	Stefan Johansson	Bettenhausen Motorsports	Penske PC23-94 Mercedes-Benz	1:37.642
8	(United States)	Jimmy Vasser	Chip Ganassi Racing	Reynard 95I Ford XB Cosworth	1:37.653
9	(Canada)	Paul Tracy	Newman-Haas Racing	Lola T95/00 Ford XB Cosworth	1:37.700
10	(Brazil)	Maurício Gugelmin	PacWest Racing	Reynard 95I Ford XB Cosworth	1:37.802
11	(United States)	Scott Pruett	Patrick Racing	Lola T95/00 Ford XB Cosworth	1:38.057
12	(Mexico)	Adrián Fernández	Galles Racing	Lola T95/00 Mercedes-Benz	1:38.059
13	(United States)	Bobby Rahal	Rahal/Hogan Racing	Lola T95/00 Mercedes-Benz	1:38.113
14	(Brazil)	Christian Fittipaldi	Walker Racing	Reynard 95I Ford XB Cosworth	1:38.180
15	(United States)	Robby Gordon	Walker Racing	Reynard 95I Ford XB Cosworth	1:38.275
16	(Belgium)	Éric Bachelart	Dale Coyne Racing	Lola T94/00 Ford XB Cosworth	1:38.532
17	(United States)	Eddie Cheever	A. J. Foyt Enterprises	Lola T95/00 Ford XB Cosworth	1:38.539
18	(United States)	Bryan Herta	Chip Ganassi Racing	Reynard 95I Ford XB Cosworth	1:38.604
19	(United States)	Danny Sullivan	PacWest Racing	Reynard 95I Ford XB Cosworth	1:38.738
20	(Italy)	Alessandro Zampedri	Dale Coyne Racing	Lola T94/00 Ford XB Cosworth	1:38.738
21	(Brazil)	Raul Boesel	Rahal/Hogan Racing	Lola T95/00 Mercedes-Benz	1:39.313
22	(Brazil)	André Ribeiro	Tasman Motorsports	Reynard 95I Honda	1:39.352
23	(Chile)	Eliseo Salazar	Dick Simon Racing	Lola T95/00 Ford XB Cosworth	1:39.881
24	(United States)	Buddy Lazier	Project Indy	Lola T93/00 Ford XB Cosworth	1:40.250
25	(United States)	Dean Hall	Dick Simon Racing	Lola T95/00 Ford XB Cosworth	1:41.586
26	(Japan)	Hiro Matsushita	Arciero Racing	Reynard 94I Ford XB Cosworth	1:42.253

== Race ==
Pos	No	Driver	Team	Laps	Time/retired	Grid	Points
1	3	(Canada) Paul Tracy	Newman-Haas Racing	65	1:58:26.054	9	20
2	9	(United States) Bobby Rahal	Rahal/Hogan Racing	65	+7.0 secs	13	16
3	20	(United States) Scott Pruett	Patrick Racing	65	+7.7 secs	11	14
4	18	(Brazil) Maurício Gugelmin	PacWest Racing	65	+13.5 secs	10	12
5	17	(United States) Danny Sullivan	PacWest Racing	65	+19.1 secs	19	10
6	1	(United States) Al Unser Jr.	Team Penske	65	+35.3 secs	3	8
7	14	(United States) Eddie Cheever	A. J. Foyt Enterprises	65	+36.3 secs	17	6
8	11	(Brazil) Raul Boesel	Rahal/Hogan Racing	65	+44.5 secs	21	5
9	6	(United States) Michael Andretti	Newman-Haas Racing	64	Contact	1	6
10	7	(Chile) Eliseo Salazar	Dick Simon Racing	64	+ 1 lap	23	3
11	25	(Japan) Hiro Matsushita	Arciero Racing	62	+ 3 laps	26	2
12	99	(United States) Dean Hall	Dick Simon Racing	61	+ 4 laps	25	1
13	33	(Italy) Teo Fabi	Forsythe Racing	60	+ 5 laps	5	
14	5	(United States) Robby Gordon	Walker Racing	59	Electrical	15	
15	4	(United States) Bryan Herta	Chip Ganassi Racing	58	Contact	18	
16	8	(Brazil) Gil de Ferran	Jim Hall Racing	54	Contact	6	
17	16	(Sweden) Stefan Johansson	Bettenhausen Motorsports	53	Transmission	7	
18	2	(Brazil) Emerson Fittipaldi	Team Penske	52	Electrical	4	
19	34	(Italy) Alessandro Zampedri	Dale Coyne Racing	51	+ 14 laps	20	
20	27	(Canada) Jacques Villeneuve	Team Green	38	Transmission	2	
21	64	(United States) Buddy Lazier	Project Indy	32	Transmission	24	
22	19	(Belgium) Éric Bachelart	Dale Coyne Racing	31	Transmission	16	
23	31	(Brazil) André Ribeiro	Tasman Motorsports	23	Transmission	22	
24	12	(United States) Jimmy Vasser	Chip Ganassi Racing	19	Transmission	8	
25	15	(Brazil) Christian Fittipaldi	Walker Racing	11	Transmission	14	
26	10	(Mexico) Adrián Fernández	Galles Racing	3	Contact	12	

== Notes ==
- Average Speed 92.335 mph
- Michael Andretti was being chased by Bobby Rahal for second behind teammate Paul Tracy on the final lap. He caught a bit too much curb in the backstretch chicanes, inducing oversteer, and clipped the barrier.
- Tracy's victory was the fifth in a row for Canadian drivers. Tracy won the final two races of 1994, and Jacques Villeneuve won the race before those two and the 1995 season opener. The next time five or more successive races were won by drivers of the same nationality would be in 1996.

Previous race: 1995 Toyota Grand Prix of Miami	PPG Indy Car World Series; 1995 season	Next race: 1995 Valvoline 200
Previous race: 1994 Australian FAI Indycar Grand Prix	1995 Indycar Australia	Next race: 1996 Bartercard Indycar Australia
