= Gordon Kirby =

Canadian auto racing journalist

Gordon Kirby (born in Brighton, England) is a Canadian auto racing journalist. He is the United States editor for Autocourse since 1973 and Motor Sport since 2008.

Kirby was raised in Toronto and began working in 1968 as Canadian correspondent for British magazine Autosport. He was United States correspondent for Autosport from 1973 to 2004.

Kirby also was co-founder of magazine OnTrack, Indy Car Racing and Racer, editor to AutoWeek, and contributor to Car and Driver and other outlets. He also was ghostwriter for several Indy car drivers.

== Publications ==
- Penske's Maestro: Karl Kainhofer & the History of Penske Racing (Racemaker Press, 2016) ISBN 978-1935240136
- Tony Bettenhausen & Sons: An American Racing Family Album (Racemaker Press, 2016) ISBN 978-1935240129
- Second to One: All But For Indy (co-authored with Joe Freeman; Racemaker Press, 2015) ISBN 978-1935240075
- Jim McGee: Crew Chief of Champions (Racemaker Press, May, 2014) ISBN 978-1935240105
- Rick Mears - Thanks: the story of Rick Mears and the Mears Gang (Crash Media Group/Autocourse, 2008) ISBN 978-1905334308
- A Winning Adventure: Honda's Ten Years in CART (co-authored with John Oreovicz; David Bull Publishing, 2003) ISBN 978-1893618268
- Mario Andretti: A Driving Passion (David Bull Publishing, 2001) ISBN 978-1893618121
- Greg Moore: A Legacy of Spirit (with Dan Proudfoot and Jim Taylor; Whitecap Books, 2000) ISBN 978-1552851395
- Bobby Rahal: The Graceful Champion (David Bull Publishing, 1999) ISBN 978-0964972285
- Unser: An American Family Portrait (Anlon Press / Henry Holt & Co., 1988) ISBN 978-0916105037
- The Art of Motor Racing with Emerson Fittipaldi (Nutmeg Productions, 1987) ASIN B0026KW77G
