= 1998 Marlboro 500 Presented by Toyota =

(United States) 1998 Fontana
Race details
- Race 19 of 19 in the 1998 CART season
- California Speedway
- Date: 1 November, 1998
- Official name: 1998 Marlboro 500 Presented by Toyota
- Location: California Speedway; Fontana, California
- Course: Permanent oval course 2.029 mi / 3.265 km
- Distance: 250 laps 507.25 mi / 816.25 km
- Weather: Temperatures reaching up to 75.9 °F (24.4 °C); wind speeds up to 11.1 miles per hour (17.9 km/h)

Pole position
- Driver: (United States) Scott Pruett (Patrick Racing)
- Time: 31.249

Fastest lap
- Driver: (Canada) Greg Moore (Forsythe Racing)
- Time: 31.119 (on lap 78 of 250)

Podium
- First: (United States) Jimmy Vasser (Chip Ganassi Racing)
- Second: (Canada) Greg Moore (Forsythe Racing)
- Third: (Italy) Alex Zanardi (Chip Ganassi Racing)

The 1998 Marlboro 500 Presented by Toyota was the nineteenth and final time of the 1998 CART FedEx Championship Series season. The race was held 1 November 1998, and was the 2nd running of the Marlboro 500 at California Speedway. It was won by Jimmy Vasser who passed Greg Moore at a final lap restart of a long race, which took well over 3 hours and also had many retirements. This marks the final Champ Car race for the 3-Time Champion Bobby Rahal and also marked the final career podium for the two-time champion Alex Zanardi.

== Qualifying results ==
Pos	Nat	Name	Team	Chassis	Time
1	(United States)	Scott Pruett	Patrick Racing	Reynard 98i Ford-Cosworth	31.249
2	(United States)	Jimmy Vasser	Chip Ganassi Racing	Reynard 98i Honda	31.301
3	(United States)	Michael Andretti	Newman-Haas Racing	Swift 009.c Ford-Cosworth	31.372
4	(United States)	Richie Hearn	Della Penna Motorsports	Swift 009.c Ford-Cosworth	31.377
5	(United States)	Bobby Rahal	Team Rahal	Reynard 98i Ford-Cosworth	31.394
6	(Brazil)	Maurício Gugelmin	PacWest Racing	Reynard 98i Mercedes-Benz	31.429
7	(United Kingdom)	Mark Blundell	PacWest Racing	Reynard 98i Mercedes-Benz	31.441
8	(Scotland)	Dario Franchitti	Team Green	Reynard 98i Honda	31.514
9	(Canada)	Greg Moore	Forsythe Racing	Reynard 98i Mercedes-Benz	31.523
10	(Brazil)	Gil de Ferran	Walker Racing	Reynard 98i Honda	31.619
11	(Brazil)	Christian Fittipaldi	Newman-Haas Racing	Swift 009.c Ford-Cosworth	31.646
12	(Canada)	Paul Tracy	Team Green	Reynard 98i Honda	31.648
13	(United States)	Al Unser Jr.	Team Penske	Penske PC27 Mercedes-Benz	31.650
14	(Canada)	Patrick Carpentier	Forsythe Racing	Reynard 98i Mercedes-Benz	31.688
15	(United States)	Alex Barron	All American Racers	Eagle 987 Toyota	31.699
16	(Brazil)	Hélio Castroneves	Bettenhausen Racing	Reynard 98i Mercedes-Benz	31.754
17	(United States)	Bryan Herta	Team Rahal	Reynard 98i Ford-Cosworth	31.766
18	(Italy)	Alex Zanardi	Chip Ganassi Racing	Reynard 98i Honda	31.824
19	(Brazil)	André Ribeiro	Team Penske	Penske PC27 Mercedes-Benz	31.887
20	(Finland)	JJ Lehto	Hogan Racing	Reynard 98i Mercedes-Benz	31.940
21	(West Germany)	Arnd Meier	Davis Racing	Lola T98/00 Ford-Cosworth	31.973
22	(United States)	Robby Gordon	Arciero-Wells Racing	Reynard 98i Toyota	32.013
23	(Brazil)	Tony Kanaan	Tasman Motorsports	Reynard 98i Honda	32.077
24	(Italy)	Max Papis	Arciero-Wells Racing	Reynard 98i Toyota	32.114
25	(Mexico)	Michel Jourdain Jr.	Payton/Coyne Racing	Reynard 98i Ford-Cosworth	32.462
26	(Italy)	Vincenzo Sospiri	All American Racers	Eagle Toyota	No time
27	(Mexico)	Adrian Fernandez	Patrick Racing	Reynard 98i Ford-Cosworth	No time
28	(United States)	Dennis Vitolo	Payton/Coyne Racing	Reynard 98i Ford-Cosworth	No time

== Classification ==
=== Race ===
Pos	No	Driver	Team	Laps	Time/Retired	Grid	Points
1	12	(United States) Jimmy Vasser	Chip Ganassi Racing	250	3:17:54.639	2	20+1
2	99	(Canada) Greg Moore	Forsythe Racing	250	+0.360	9	16
3	1	(Italy) Alex Zanardi	Chip Ganassi Racing	250	+1.117	18	14
4	40	(Mexico) Adrián Fernández	Patrick Racing	250	+1.137	27	12
5	17	(Brazil) Maurício Gugelmin	PacWest Racing Group	250	+1.164	6	10
6	18	(United Kingdom) Mark Blundell	PacWest Racing Group	250	+1.463	7	8
7	11	(Brazil) Christian Fittipaldi	Newman-Haas Racing	250	+2.486	11	6
8	10	(United States) Richie Hearn	Della Penna Motorsports	250	+11.685	4	5
9	24	(United States) Robby Gordon	Arciero-Wells Racing	249	+1 Lap	22	4
10	16	(Brazil) Hélio Castro-Neves	Bettenhausen Racing	249	+1 Lap	16	3
11	7	(United States) Bobby Rahal	Team Rahal	249	+1 Lap	5	2
12	19	(Mexico) Michel Jourdain Jr.	Payton/Coyne Racing	247	+3 Laps	25	1
13	36	(United States) Alex Barron	All American Racing	246	+4 Laps	15	
14	26	(Canada) Paul Tracy	Team Green	245	Contact	12	
15	8	(United States) Bryan Herta	Team Rahal	239	Contact	17	
16	25	(Italy) Max Papis	Arciero-Wells Racing	239	Contact	24	
17	5	(Brazil) Gil de Ferran	Walker Racing	232	Engine	10	
18	6	(United States) Michael Andretti	Newman-Haas Racing	210	Contact	3	
19	21	(Brazil) Tony Kanaan	Tasman Motorsports Group	171	Wheel Bearing	23	
20	20	(United States) Scott Pruett	Patrick Racing	138	Contact	1	1
21	9	(Finland) JJ Lehto	Hogan Racing	124	Engine	20	
22	27	(Scotland) Dario Franchitti	Team Green	112	Engine	8	
23	98	(Italy) Vincenzo Sospiri	All American Racing	94	Water leak	26	
24	77	(West Germany) Arnd Meier	Davis Racing	85	Engine	21	
25	34	(United States) Dennis Vitolo	Payton/Coyne Racing	66	Suspension	28	
26	33	(Canada) Patrick Carpentier	Forsythe Racing	59	Transmission	14	
27	2	(United States) Al Unser Jr.	Team Penske	33	Oil leak	13	
28	3	(Brazil) André Ribeiro	Team Penske	6	Contact	19	

== Caution flags ==
Laps	Cause
8–17	Ribeiro (3) contact
89–96	Meier (77) engine blow-up
113–121	Franchitti (27) engine blow-up
127–130	Lehto (9) engine blow-up
140–148	Pruett (20) contact
184–193	Hearn (10) spin
212–221	Andretti (6) contact
236–240	de Ferran (5) engine blow-up
241–246	Herta (8), Papis (24) contact
247–249	Tracy (26) contact

== Lap Leaders ==
Laps	Leader
1–2	Jimmy Vasser
3	Michael Andretti
4–24	Jimmy Vasser
25–40	Michael Andretti
41–42	Greg Moore
43–44	Maurício Gugelmin
45–51	Richie Hearn
52–58	Greg Moore
59–70	Michael Andretti
71–80	Greg Moore
81	Maurício Gugelmin
82	Mark Blundell
83–84	Maurício Gugelmin
85–121	Greg Moore
122–130	Maurício Gugelmin
131–141	Paul Tracy
142–150	Michael Andretti
151–181	Jimmy Vasser
182–200	Maurício Gugelmin
201–206	Michael Andretti
207–213	Jimmy Vasser
214–220	Maurício Gugelmin
221–245	Paul Tracy
246–248	Greg Moore
249–250	Jimmy Vasser

Driver	Laps led
Jimmy Vasser	63
Greg Moore	59
Michael Andretti	44
Maurício Gugelmin	40
Paul Tracy	36
Richie Hearn	7
Mark Blundell	1

== Point standings after race ==
Pos	Driver	Points
1	(Italy) Alex Zanardi	285
2	(United States) Jimmy Vasser	169
3	(United Kingdom) Dario Franchitti	160
4	(Mexico) Adrián Fernández	154
5	(Canada) Greg Moore	141
