= André Ribeiro (racing driver) =

Brazilian racing driver (1966–2021)

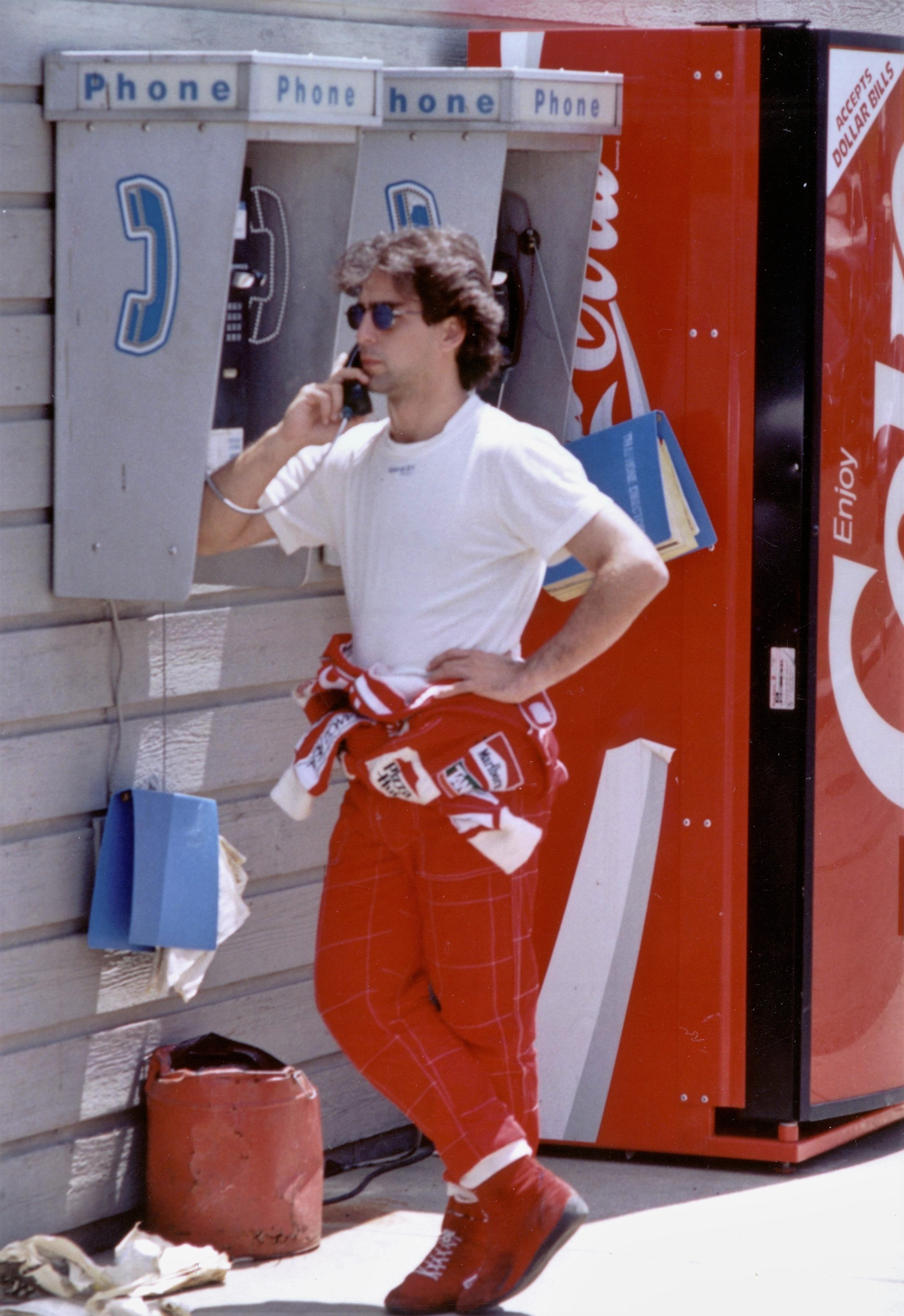
- Ribeiro in 1995
- Born: André Ribeiro da Cunha Pereira; January 18, 1966; São Paulo, Brazil
- Died: May 22, 2021 (aged 55)
- Cause of death: Colorectal cancer

Champ Car career
- 69 races run over 4 years
- Years active: 1995-1998
- Team(s): No. 31 (Tasman Motorsports; 1995-1997); No. 3 (Team Penske; 1998)
- Best finish: 11th (1996)
- First race: 1995 Marlboro Grand Prix of Miami (Bicentennial Park)
- Last race: 1998 Marlboro 500 (California)
- First win: 1995 New England 200 (New Hampshire)
- Last win: 1996 Marlboro 500 (Michigan)
Wins	Podiums	Poles
3	4	2

Previous series
- 1990 1991-1993 1994: Formula Opel; British Formula Three Championship; Indy Lights
- Statistics up to date as of May 31, 2021.

André Ribeiro da Cunha Pereira (Portuguese pronunciation: [ɐ̃ˈdɾɛ ˈʁibejɾu]) (January 18, 1966 – May 22, 2021) was a Brazilian racing driver who raced in CART from 1995 through 1998, where he claimed three wins.

== Career ==
Ribeiro started his career in karting and he finished second in the Paulista Kart Championship, Brazil's national karting championship, for three consecutive years between 1986 and 1988. In 1989, he moved to compete in Formula Ford finishing third in his debut season in Brazil's national Formula Three Championship. In 1990, he moved to Formula Opel where he competed for Team Lotus Nederland. In 1991, he moved to British Formula 3 where he drove first for Paul Stewart Racing and then Fortec Motorsport. In 1994, he drove in Indy Lights for Tasman Motorsports finishing second in his debut 1994 season where he won four races.

Ribeiro remained with Tasman Motorsports when he moved to CART in 1995 and would remain with them until 1997. He finished 18th at the 1995 Indianapolis 500, and got a win at New Hampshire. In 1996, he won two oval races at his homeland Jacarepaguá and at the Michigan summer race, and finished fourth at the U.S. 500. Ribeiro ranked fourth in points. In 1997, he scored a third place finish at Toronto and a fourth place at Laguna Seca. For the 1998 season, Ribeiro remained in CART but moved to Team Penske, where he scored just 13 points with no top-fives. He retired at the end of the 1998 season.

Ribeiro received an offer to work with Roger Penske in South America, with United Auto, running over 15 car dealerships in São Paulo. He also promoted the Brazilian Formula Renault and Renault Clio Cup together with Pedro Paulo Diniz.

Ribeiro died on 22 May 2021, aged 55, from colorectal cancer.

== Racing record ==
=== American open–wheel racing results ===
(key) (Races in bold indicate pole position) (Races in italics indicate fastest lap)

==== Indy Lights ====
Year	Team	1	2	3	4	5	6	7	8	9	10	11	12	Rank	Points
1994	Tasman Motorsports	PHX; 4	LBH; 20	**MIL**; 17	DET; 4	**POR**; 1	CLE; 5	TOR; 2	**MDO**; 1	NHA; 2	VAN; 1	NAZ; 2	**LS**; 1	**2nd**	**170**

==== CART ====
Year	Team	Chassis	Engine	1	2	3	4	5	6	7	8	9	10	11	12	13	14	15	16	17	18	19	Rank	Points	Ref
1995	Tasman Motorsports	Reynard 95i	Honda HRX V8t	MIA; 21	SRF; 23	PHX; 26	LBH; 12	NZR; 11															17th	38	
1995	Tasman Motorsports	Reynard 95i	Honda HRH V8t						INDY; 18	MIL; 25	DET; 18	POR; 14	ROA; 4	TOR; 13	CLE; 27	MIS; 21	MDO; 27	**NHA**; 1	VAN; 23	LS; 26			17th	38	
1996	Tasman Motorsports	Lola T96/00	Honda HRH V8t	MIA; 16	RIO; 1	SRF; 8	LBH; 27	NZR; 12	500; 4	MIL; 8	DET; 24	POR; 7	CLE; 20	**TOR**; 21	MIS; 1	MDO; 8	ROA; 19	VAN; 21	LS; 19				11th	76	
1997	Tasman Motorsports	Lola T97/00	Honda HRR V8t	MIA; 12	SRF; 6	LBH; 14	NZR; 26	RIO; 15	STL; 10	MIL; 26	DET; 25	POR; 13											14th	45	
1997	Tasman Motorsports	Reynard 97i	Honda HRR V8t										CLE; 14	TOR; 3	MIS; 23	MDO; 10	ROA; 22	VAN; 10	LS; 4	FON; 17			14th	45	
1998	Penske Racing	Penske PC-27	Mercedes-Benz IC108E V8t	MIA; 17	MOT; 9	LBH; 22	NZR; DNQ	RIO; 22	STL; 20	MIL; 18	DET; 16	POR; 15	CLE; 22	TOR; 23	MIS; 28	MDO; 10	ROA; 25	VAN; 7	LS; 14	HOU; 17	SRF; 13	FON; 28	22nd	13	
