= Arnd Meier =

German racing driver

Arnd Meier (born March 1, 1973, in Hannover, West Germany) is a former race car driver. After finishing second in the 1996 German Formula Three Championship behind Jarno Trulli, but ahead of teammate Nick Heidfeld, Meier participated in the 1997 and 1998 seasons of the CART World Series for Project Indy and Davis Racing. He led for two laps on his Champ Car debut in Australia, largely as the result of pit strategy. For much of his time in Champ Car, he drove the only Lola chassis in the field, at a time when Lola were struggling to match the pace of the dominant Reynard chassis. Among his 29 starts, his best finish was 10th place at Road America in 1998.

In 1999, Meier returned to Europe to race in F3000 and touring cars.

In 2004, Meier and René Wolff drove a BMW 318i to win the BFGoodrich Long Distance Championship.

== Motorsports Career Results ==
=== American Open Wheel ===
(key)

==== CART ====
Year	Team	1	2	3	4	5	6	7	8	9	10	11	12	13	14	15	16	17	18	19	Rank	Points	Ref
1997	Project Indy	MIA	SRF; 16	LBH	NZR	RIO; 25	STL; DNS	MIL	DET; 18	POR; 18	CLE; 22	TOR; 24	MIS; 12	MDO; 16	ROA; 19	VAN	LS	FON; 25			**30th**	**1**	
1998	Davis Racing	MIA; 21	MOT; 15	LBH; 15	NZR; 24	RIO; 14	STL; 21	MIL; 23	DET; 27	POR; 12	CLE; 16	TOR; 15	MIS; 14	MDO; 18	ROA; 10	VAN; 28	LS; 15	HOU; 16	SRF; 27	FON; 24	**25th**	**4**	

Series Summary

Years	Teams	Starts	Points	Poles	Wins	Podiums (Non-win)	Top 10s (Non-podium)	Championships
2	2	29	5	0	0	0	1	0

=== International Formula 3000 ===
(key) (Races in bold indicate pole position) (Races in italics indicate fastest lap)

Year	Entrant	1	2	3	4	5	6	7	8	9	10	DC	Points
1999	Nordic Racing	IMO	MON	CAT	MAG; DNQ	SIL; DNQ	A1R; DNQ	HOC; DNQ	HUN; DNQ	SPA; DNQ	NÜR; DNQ	NC	0

=== Complete Super Tourenwagen Cup results ===
(key) (Races in bold indicate pole position) (Races in italics indicate fastest lap)

Year	Team	Car	1	2	3	4	5	6	7	8	9	10	11	12	13	14	15	16	17	18	19	20	Pos.	Pts
1999	Jever Audi-Team AZK Phoenix	Audi A4 Quattro	SAC; 1; 13	SAC; 2; 10	ZWE; 1; 8	ZWE; 2; 8	OSC; 1; 9	OSC; 2; 8	NOR; 1; 7	NOR; 2; 8	MIS; 1; 8	MIS; 2; 7	NÜR; 1; 5	NÜR; 2; 7	SAL; 1; 9	SAL; 2 Ret	OSC; 1 Ret	OSC; 2 Ret	HOC; 1; 8	HOC; 2; 5	NÜR; 1; 9	NÜR; 2; 6	9th	331

Sporting positions
Preceded by Thomas Wöhrle	German Formula Renault champion 1993	Succeeded by Marcel Tiemann
