= 1997 Michigan 500 =

Coordinates: 42°03′58.68″N 84°14′29.18″W

(United States) 1997 Michigan 500
Race details
- Race 12 of 17 in the 1997 CART season
- Date: July 27, 1997
- Official name: 1997 U.S. 500 Presented by Toyota
- Location: Michigan International Speedway, Brooklyn, Michigan, United States
- Course: Permanent racing facility 2.000 mi / 3.219 km
- Distance: 250 laps 500.000 mi / 804.672 km
- Weather: Partly Cloudy with temperatures up to 88 °F (31 °C); wind speeds reaching up to 10 miles per hour (16 km/h)

Pole position
- Driver: (United States) Scott Pruett (Patrick Racing)
- Time: 233.857 mph (376.356 km/h)

Podium
- First: (Italy) Alex Zanardi (Chip Ganassi Racing)
- Second: (United Kingdom) Mark Blundell (PacWest Racing)
- Third: (Brazil) Gil de Ferran (Walker Racing)

The 1997 Michigan 500, the seventeenth running of the event, was held at the Michigan International Speedway in Brooklyn, Michigan, on Sunday, July 27, 1997. The race was branded as the 1997 U.S. 500 Presented by Toyota, for sponsorship reasons, and in an attempt to create a link to the 1996 U.S. 500, which had been run on Memorial Day the previous season. The race was won by Alex Zanardi, his first Indy Car victory on an oval. The race was round 12 of 17 in the 1997 CART PPG World Series.

== Background ==
In 1996, CART attempted to compete with the Indy Racing League and the Indianapolis 500 by scheduling the U.S. 500 at Michigan on the same day. While the U.S. 500 had a high amount of spectators and television viewers, CART chose not to compete directly with the Indy 500 again.

In October 1996, CART released the 1997 schedule. The Memorial Day U.S. 500 was not retained for 1997, owing to CART's desire to not have two races at the same venue. Instead, the U.S. 500 name was kept and the July race date, which had been the Michigan 500, was rebranded as the U.S. 500.

The decision for Michigan 500 to take the U.S. 500 name while losing the prestige drew attention to CART's problem of not having a flagship race. "Every series needs a flagship race," team owner John Della Penna said, "I don't think we have one right now."

The 1996 U.S. 500 attracted 110,000 spectators and paid over one million dollars to win. Despite sharing a name, the 1997 U.S. 500 was expected to draw between 50,000 and 60,000 spectators and paid only $100,000 to win. Bobby Rahal said, "My feeling is that you can't just name marquee events. They're created over time." Jimmy Vasser was quoted as saying, "I don't think you can say it is of the same magnitude that it was last year. There is no doubt about it: The U.S. 500 is one of our showcase or premier events, but I don't think you can say that one race stands out as a crown jewel."

Motorsports writer for the Los Angeles Times, Shav Glick, noted that the 1996 U.S. 500 was promoted "as if it were the Super Bowl. This year, it is the track's race is being conducted with no more vigor than any other race at say, Milwaukee, Mid-Ohio or Vancouver."

The difference between the U.S. 500 in 1996 and 1997 highlighted CART's strategy that no race should stand above all others as the flagship race, as President Andrew Craig explained, "While the Indy 500 was a part of the series, it was always a little unclear in peoples' minds as to what was important, winning the Indy 500 or winning the championship. We, as an organization, never really developed a championship to the level of prestige that it should enjoy. So very, very high on my list of priorities is to create the mood and atmosphere of the national championship."

Entering the U.S. 500, CART officials added tunnel blocks to take away downforce and in theory reduce the speeds that had climbed over 235 mph in recent years.

== Practice and Time Trials ==
In Friday's opening practice session, Maurício Gugelmin posted the fastest speed with a lap at 234.283 mph. Raul Boesel was second at 233.971 mph, his teammate Scott Pruett at 233.584 mph. 14 cars went faster than 230 mph.

Scott Pruett won the pole with a speed of 233.857 mph. Despite CART's efforts to slow the cars, Pruett's pole speed was only a tenth of a second slower the track record set by Jimmy Vasser in the 1996 Michigan 500. Mauricio Gugelmin was second at 233.493 mph.

On Sunday morning, the International Race of Champions competed at Michigan. Randy Lajoie won the 100 mile race while Mark Martin won the series championship. Al Unser Jr., Jimmy Vasser, and Alex Zanardi competed in both IROC and CART.

== Race ==
An estimated 85,000 spectators attended the U.S. 500. Hot temperatures raised the track temperature to 135 degrees.

CART returned to a two abreast start for the first time since 1993. Pruett and Gugelmin raced side by side for much of the first lap, with Pruett leading the opening lap by a narrow margin. Gugelmin took the lead with an inside pass into turn one and held the lead for the next 34 laps. Defending winner at Michigan, Andre Ribeiro took the lead at lap 36 and held it for the next 20 laps.

On lap 54, Parker Johnstone cut a tire and crashed in turn two, hitting the wall with the right side of his car. A piece of suspension entered the cockpit and hit Johnstone in the helmet. Aside from a laceration on his forehead, he was uninjured.

Under caution, race leader Ribeiro suffered a transmission failure and retired from the race. At the same time, Jimmy Vasser suffered a similar transmission problem and retired.

Bobby Rahal led 25 laps and was seeking his first win since October 1992. Alex Zanardi, recovering from a penalty for running over pit equipment on lap 33, took the lead from Rahal on lap 119.

Trying to passed the lapped car of Dennis Vitolo on lap 127, Rahal drifted high in turn two and hit the wall with the right side of his car. Rahal suffered a bruised right hip in the incident.

Scott Pruett had led 32 laps but drifted high in turn two on lap 175 and crashed out of the race. Mechanical problems sidelined Michael Andretti, Al Unser Jr., and Dario Franchitti among others.

Zanardi led 93 of the final 98 laps and won the U.S. 500 by 31.737 seconds over Mark Blundell. Only 11 of the 28 starters finished the race.

== Box score ==
Finish	Grid	No	Name	Team	Chassis	Engine	Tire	Laps	Time/Status	Led	Points
1	7	4	(Italy) Alex Zanardi	Chip Ganassi Racing	Reynard 97I	Honda	F	250	2:59:35.579	104	21
2	11	18	(United Kingdom) Mark Blundell	PacWest Racing	Reynard 97I	Mercedes-Benz	F	250	+31.737	0	16
3	10	5	(Brazil) Gil de Ferran	Walker Racing	Reynard 97I	Honda	G	249	+1 Lap	5	14
4	18	3	(Canada) Paul Tracy	Marlboro Team Penske	Penske PC-26	Mercedes-Benz	G	249	+1 Lap	0	12
5	8	8	(United States) Bryan Herta	Team Rahal	Reynard 97I	Ford	G	248	+2 Laps	0	10
6	2	17	(Brazil) Maurício Gugelmin	PacWest Racing	Reynard 97I	Mercedes-Benz	F	244	+6 Laps	34	8
7	27	34	(United States) Dennis Vitolo	Payton-Coyne Racing	Lola T97/00	Ford	F	242	+8 Laps	0	6
8	23	25	(Italy) Max Papis	Arciero-Wells Racing	Reynard 97I	Toyota	F	241	+9 Laps	0	5
9	26	24	(Japan) Hiro Matsushita	Arciero-Wells Racing	Reynard 97I	Toyota	F	241	+9 Laps	0	4
10	20	77	(Brazil) Gualter Salles	Davis Racing	Reynard 97I	Ford	G	240	+10 Laps	0	3
11	25	36	(Argentina) Juan Manuel Fangio II	All American Racers	Reynard 97I	Toyota	G	226	Transmission	0	2
12	28	64	(Germany) Arnd Meier	Project Indy	Lola T97/00	Ford	G	224	+26 Laps	0	1
13	17	19	(Mexico) Michel Jourdain Jr.	Payton-Coyne Racing	Lola T97/00	Ford	F	182	Transmission	0	0
14	1	20	(United States) Scott Pruett	Patrick Racing	Reynard 97I	Ford	F	174	Crash	32	1
15	12	16	(Canada) Patrick Carpentier	Bettenhausen Motorsports	Reynard 97I	Mercedes-Benz	G	144	Electrical	14	0
16	14	11	(Brazil) Christian Fittipaldi	Newman/Haas Racing	Swift 007.i	Ford	G	128	Lost wheel	0	0
17	6	7	(United States) Bobby Rahal	Team Rahal	Reynard 97I	Ford	G	126	Crash	25	0
18	3	40	(Brazil) Raul Boesel	Patrick Racing	Reynard 97I	Ford	F	120	Transmission	0	0
19	13	9	(United Kingdom) Dario Franchitti	Hogan Racing	Reynard 97I	Mercedes-Benz	F	101	Transmission	12	0
20	16	2	(United States) Al Unser Jr.	Marlboro Team Penske	Penske PC-26	Mercedes-Benz	G	97	Engine	0	0
21	19	6	(United States) Michael Andretti	Newman/Haas Racing	Swift 007.i	Ford	G	79	Transmission	3	0
22	22	21	(United States) Richie Hearn	Della Penna Motorsports	Lola T97/00	Ford	G	60	Turbo control	0	0
23	9	31	(Brazil) André Ribeiro	Tasman Motorsports	Reynard 97I	Honda	F	57	Transmission	21	0
24	4	1	(United States) Jimmy Vasser	Chip Ganassi Racing	Reynard 97I	Honda	F	57	Transmission	0	0
25	5	27	(United States) Parker Johnstone	Team Green	Reynard 97I	Honda	F	53	Crash	0	0
26	15	32	(Mexico) Adrián Fernández	Tasman Motorsports	Lola T97/00	Honda	F	46	Electrical	0	0
27	21	99	(Canada) Greg Moore	Forsythe Racing	Reynard 97I	Mercedes-Benz	F	19	Turbo control	0	0
28	24	98	(United States) P. J. Jones	All American Racers	Reynard 97I	Toyota	G	11	Engine	0	0

Tires:

- F - Firestone Tire and Rubber Company
- G - Goodyear Tire and Rubber Company

=== Race statistics ===
Lap Leaders
Laps	Leader
1	Scott Pruett
2–35	Maurício Gugelmin
36–56	André Ribeiro
57–75	Scott Pruett
76–78	Michael Andretti
79–81	Scott Pruett
82–93	Dario Franchitti
94–118	Bobby Rahal
119–129	Alex Zanardi
130–143	Patrick Carpentier
144–152	Scott Pruett
153–214	Alex Zanardi
215–219	Gil de Ferran
220–250	Alex Zanardi

== Broadcasting ==
The Michigan 500 was broadcast live on television by ABC. Bob Varsha was the lead announcer and was joined by Danny Sullivan as color commentator.
