= 1997 Molson Indy Vancouver =

(Canada) 1997 Vancouver
Race details
- Race 15 of 17 in the 1997 CART season
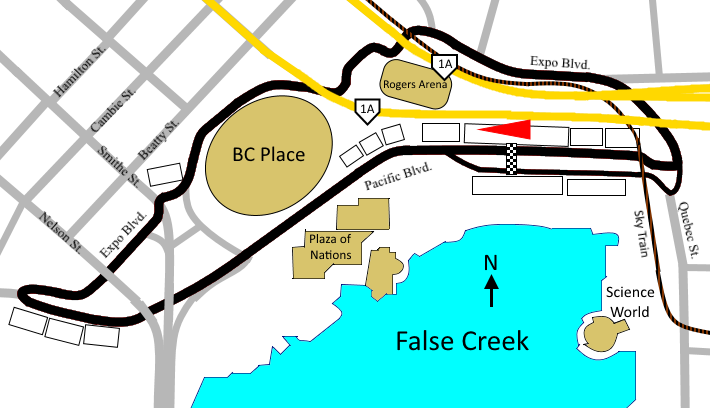
- Date: August 31, 1997
- Official name: Molson Indy Vancouver
- Location: Streets of Vancouver, British Columbia
- Course: Street track 1.653 mi / 2.660 km
- Distance: 100 laps 165.300 mi / 266.000 km
- Weather: Temperatures reaching up to 22.2 °C (72.0 °F) before dropping down to 17.5 °C (63.5 °F) by the end of the event

Pole position
- Driver: (Italy) Alex Zanardi (Chip Ganassi Racing)
- Time: 54.025

Fastest lap
- Driver: (Italy) Alex Zanardi (Chip Ganassi Racing)
- Time: 55.136 (on lap 82 of 100)

Podium
- First: (Brazil) Maurício Gugelmin (PacWest Racing)
- Second: (United States) Jimmy Vasser (Chip Ganassi Racing)
- Third: (Brazil) Gil de Ferran (Walker Racing)

The 1997 Molson Indy Vancouver was the 15th round of the 1997 CART season. At that time, the Italian driver Alex Zanardi was the leader of the standings with 39 points in front of the French-Brazilian driver Gil de Ferran.

== Starting grid ==
1. Alex Zanardi 54.025 seconds
2. Bobby Rahal 54.351 seconds
3. Jimmy Vasser 54.386 seconds
4. Michael Andretti 54.419 seconds
5. Maurício Gugelmin 54.505 seconds
6. Bryan Herta 54.542 seconds
7. Gil de Ferran 54.553 seconds
8. Mark Blundell 54.600 seconds
9. Greg Moore 54.614 seconds
10. Dario Franchitti 54.655 seconds
11. Scott Pruett 54.750 seconds
12. Raul Boesel 55.052 seconds
13. André Ribeiro 55.090 seconds
14. Christian Fittipaldi 55.118 seconds
15. Michel Jourdain Jr. 55.183 seconds
16. Adrian Fernandez 55.315 seconds
17. Paul Tracy 55.535 seconds
18. Parker Johnstone 55.635 seconds
19. Max Papis 55.930 seconds
20. Roberto Moreno 55.962 seconds
21. Richie Hearn 56.027 seconds
22. Al Unser Jr. 56.028 seconds
23. Christian Danner 56.068 seconds
24. Juan Manuel Fangio II 56.241 seconds
25. P. J. Jones 56.373 seconds
26. Hiro Matsushita 58.508 seconds
27. Dennis Vitolo 1:02:557
28. Gualter Salles No time

== Race ==
=== First 30 laps ===
At the start, Dennis Vitolo stalled his engine at turn 3. But he continued in the race. The Penske Racing driver Paul Tracy had a collision with a driver at the chicane. The driver, probably, was André Ribeiro. First caution came out, as Dennis Vitolo had a contact with a tyre wall. P. J. Jones went to the pits at the time of the full course caution. Restart came out very soon, but Michel Jourdain Jr. was spun by Al Unser Jr. in the final corner. But he was back on the field. After 9 laps, the top 6 was: Alex Zanardi, Bobby Rahal, Jimmy Vasser, Maurício Gugelmin, Michael Andretti and Bryan Herta. At lap 16, Zanardi missed the hairpin. When he would come back to the race, his engine had stalled. But he remained in the race, although, lost many positions. At lap 20, P. J. Jones retired due to an engine failure. At lap 26, Vasser took the lead after overtaking Rahal at turn 10.

=== Lap 31 - Lap 60 ===
At lap 35, Bobby Rahal retired after a transmission failure. At lap 47, Richie Hearn was hit by Michel Jourdain Jr. at turn 10. This caused a full course caution. Restart came out at lap 53. At lap 54, Alex Zanardi hit Bryan Herta at turn 10, and, at the chicane, Scott Pruett had hit the back of the car of Adrian Fernandez, resulting in another caution. Restart came at lap 57.

=== Lap 61 - Lap 80 ===
Then, Greg Moore had some damages in his right-front suspension at lap 64. At lap 68, Zanardi did an amazing overtaking manoeuvre on Michael Andretti at Turn 3 (The hairpin). Right after this, Andretti suffered problems on his suspension, and retired from the race.

=== Last 20 laps ===
With 18 laps to go, Alex Zanardi stalled his engine at the hairpin (Turn 3) again. He came back to the race at 10th place. The top 6 at the following lap was: Bryan Herta, Maurício Gugelmin, Jimmy Vasser, Al Unser Jr., Gil de Ferran and Mark Blundell. With 14 laps to go, Zanardi knocked Herta out at the chicane, right after the hairpin. Despite the collision, Herta did not retire. At the last lap, Christian Fittipaldi crashed at turn 10 and retired, but was classified 9th.

== Box score ==
Finish	Grid	No	Name	Team	Chassis	Engine	Tire	Laps	Time/Status	Led	Points
1	5	17	(Brazil) Maurício Gugelmin	PacWest Racing	Reynard 97I	Mercedes-Benz	F	100	1:47:17.995	18	20
2	3	1	(United States) Jimmy Vasser	Chip Ganassi Racing	Reynard 97I	Honda	F	100	+2.872	46	17
3	7	5	(Brazil) Gil de Ferran	Walker Racing	Reynard 97I	Honda	G	100	+3.773	1	14
4	1	4	(Italy) Alex Zanardi	Chip Ganassi Racing	Reynard 97I	Honda	F	100	+7.738	15	13
5	22	2	(United States) Al Unser Jr.	Marlboro Team Penske	Penske PC-26	Mercedes-Benz	G	100	+16.438	0	10
6	12	40	(Brazil) Raul Boesel	Patrick Racing	Reynard 97I	Ford	F	100	+23.160	0	8
7	8	18	(United Kingdom) Mark Blundell	PacWest Racing	Reynard 97I	Mercedes-Benz	F	100	+30.416	0	6
8	6	8	(United States) Bryan Herta	Team Rahal	Reynard 97I	Ford	G	100	+30.467	10	5
9	14	11	(Brazil) Christian Fittipaldi	Newman/Haas Racing	Swift 007.i	Ford	G	99	Crash	0	4
10	13	31	(Brazil) André Ribeiro	Tasman Motorsports	Reynard 97I	Honda	F	99	+1 Lap	0	3
11	18	27	(United States) Parker Johnstone	Team Green	Reynard 97I	Honda	F	99	+1 Lap	0	2
12	24	36	(Argentina) Juan Manuel Fangio II	All American Racers	Reynard 97I	Toyota	G	98	+2 Laps	0	1
13	10	9	(United Kingdom) Dario Franchitti	Hogan Racing	Reynard 97I	Mercedes-Benz	F	95	Crash	0	0
14	26	24	(Japan) Hiro Matsushita	Arciero-Wells Racing	Reynard 97I	Toyota	F	94	+6 Laps	0	0
15	20	16	(Brazil) Roberto Moreno	Bettenhausen Motorsports	Reynard 97I	Mercedes-Benz	G	80	Steering	0	0
16	4	6	(United States) Michael Andretti	Newman/Haas Racing	Swift 007.i	Ford	G	71	Crash	0	0
17	9	99	(Canada) Greg Moore	Forsythe Racing	Reynard 97I	Mercedes-Benz	F	63	Crash	0	0
18	11	20	(United States) Scott Pruett	Patrick Racing	Reynard 97I	Ford	F	52	Crash	0	0
19	16	32	(Mexico) Adrián Fernández	Tasman Motorsports	Lola T97/00	Honda	F	52	Crash	0	0
20	19	25	(Italy) Max Papis	Arciero-Wells Racing	Reynard 97I	Toyota	F	52	Clutch	0	0
21	15	19	(Mexico) Michel Jourdain Jr.	Payton-Coyne Racing	Reynard 97I	Ford	F	46	Crash	0	0
22	21	21	(United States) Richie Hearn	Della Penna Motorsports	Lola T97/00	Ford	G	44	Crash	0	0
23	23	34	(Germany) Christian Danner	Payton-Coyne Racing	Reynard 97I	Ford	F	41	Engine	0	0
24	2	7	(United States) Bobby Rahal	Team Rahal	Reynard 97I	Ford	G	34	Engine	10	0
25	25	98	(United States) P. J. Jones	All American Racers	Reynard 97I	Toyota	G	19	Engine	0	0
26	28	77	(Brazil) Gualter Salles	Davis Racing	Reynard 97I	Ford	G	19	Crash	0	0
27	27	64	(United States) Dennis Vitolo	Project Indy	Lola T97/00	Ford	G	1	Crash	0	0
28	17	3	(Canada) Paul Tracy	Marlboro Team Penske	Penske PC-26	Mercedes-Benz	G	1	Crash	0	0

=== Race statistics ===
Lap Leaders
Laps	Leader
1–15	Alex Zanardi
16–25	Bobby Rahal
26–35	Jimmy Vasser
36–37	Maurício Gugelmin
38–73	Jimmy Vasser
74–75	Maurício Gugelmin
76	Gil de Ferran
77–86	Bryan Herta
87–100	Maurício Gugelmin

Cautions: 4 for 15 laps
Laps	Reason
3–6	Dennis Vitolo accident
48–52	Michel Jourdain Jr. and Richie Hearn accident
55–58	Scott Pruett and Adrián Fernández accident
87–88	Bryan Herta accident

== Notes ==
1. After his collision with Bryan Herta, Alex Zanardi was fined after the race.
2. This was the last time that CART had run in Vancouver's original track. From 1998, CART had used another track.
3. Maurício Gugelmin won for the first and only time in his CART career.
4. Alex Zanardi took his 10th and final Pole Position in his CART career.
