= Paul Jasper =

American former race car driver

Paul Jasper (born November 2, 1974) is an American former race car driver born in Dayton, Ohio. He was the 1996 Rookie of the Year and finished third overall in points as a Toyota Atlantic driver. In 1997 he signed to drive in CART for Dale Coyne Racing, driving the #34 Lola Ford-Cosworth. Coming off of a championship '96 season the '97 Lola was a very uncompetitive and flawed chassis. This resulted in bad timing for Jasper. He attempted six races, but failed to qualify for two, resulting in four race starts. Jasper's best finish was an 18th place in his final start, the Miller 200 at The Milwaukee Mile.

== Career results ==
=== American Open-Wheel racing results ===
(key)

==== Atlantic Championship ====
Year	Team	1	2	3	4	5	6	7	8	9	10	11	12	Rank	Points
1996	BDJS	MIA; 10	LBH; 4	NAZ; 7	MIL; 5	MTR; 4	TOR; 3	TRO; 2	TRO; 2	MOH; 22	ROA; 4	VAN; 3	LAG; 7	3rd	132

==== Indy Lights ====
Year	Team	1	2	3	4	5	6	7	8	9	10	11	12	13	14	Rank	Points
1998	PacWest Racing	MIA	LBH; 17	NAZ	STL	MIL	DET	POR	CLE	TOR	MIS	TRO	VAN	LAG	FON	32nd	0

==== CART ====
Year	Team	Chassis	Engine	1	2	3	4	5	6	7	8	9	10	11	12	13	14	15	16	17	Rank	Points	Ref
1997	Dale Coyne Racing	Lola T97	Ford XD	MIA	SRF; 23	LBH; 19	NZR; DNQ	RIO; 24	STL; Wth	MIL; 18	DET	POR	CLE	TOR	MIS	MOH	ROA	VAN	LS	FON	33rd	0	
