= Lola T98/00 =

Racing car designed and built by Lola Cars

- Category: CART IndyCar
- Constructor: Lola
- Predecessor: Lola T97/00
- Successor: Lola B99/00

Technical specifications
- Length: 4,978 mm (196 in)
- Width: 2,032 mm (80 in)
- Height: 940 mm (37 in)
- Axle track: 1,753 mm (69 in) (Front); 1,638 mm (64 in) (Rear)
- Wheelbase: 2,997 mm (118 in)
- Engine: Ford/Cosworth XB; Honda turbo Indy V8 engine 2.65 L (2,650 cc; 162 cu in) mid-engined
- Transmission: 6-speed manual
- Weight: 1,550 lb (700 kg)
- Fuel: Methanol
- Tyres: Goodyear

Competition history
- Notable drivers: Arnd Meier; Gualter Salles
- Debut: 1998 Marlboro Grand Prix of Miami

The Lola T98/00 is an open-wheel racing car chassis, designed and built by Lola Cars that competed in the CART open-wheel racing series, for competition in the 1998 CART season. The chassis saw very limited use, with only one team - Davis Racing - using it during the 1998 season. The chassis only finished in the top 10 once, with a 10th place scored by Arnd Meier at Road America. It scored only 4 points during the 1998 season, placing it 4th in the chassis' championship, with only the Eagle 987 finishing behind it. It was mainly powered by the 850 hp (630 kW) Ford/Cosworth XB turbo engine.
