= 1997 Marlboro 500 =

(United States) 1997 Fontana
Race details
- Race 17 of 17 in the 1997 CART season
- Date: September 28, 1997
- Official name: Marlboro 500 Presented By Toyota
- Location: California Speedway
- Course: Oval; 2.029 mi / 3.265 km
- Distance: 250 laps 507.250 mi / 816.340 km
- Weather: Temperatures reaching up to 100.4 °F (38.0 °C); wind speeds up to 10.2 miles per hour (16.4 km/h)

Pole position
- Driver: (Brazil) Maurício Gugelmin (PacWest Racing)
- Time: 240.942 mph (387.759 km/h)

Fastest lap
- Driver: (Canada) Greg Moore (Forsythe Racing)
- Time: 236.388 mph (380.430 km/h) (on lap 83 of 250)

Podium
- First: (United Kingdom) Mark Blundell (PacWest Racing)
- Second: (United States) Jimmy Vasser (Chip Ganassi Racing)
- Third: (Mexico) Adrian Fernández (Tasman Motorsports)

The 1997 Marlboro 500 Presented By Toyota was the 17th and last round of the 1997 CART season. It happened on September 28, 1997, at the then brand-new California Speedway.

== Qualifying ==
Brazilian PacWest Racing driver Maurício Gugelmin set the pole with 240.942 mph (387.759 km).

== Race ==
=== Before the start ===
All American Racers's Juan Manuel Fangio II did not start the race due a fire on the back of his car. This brought out the races first caution even before the start.

=== Lap 10 - Lap 52 ===
Chip Ganassi Racing Dutch driver Arie Luyendyk, who was replacing series champion Alex Zanardi, had a pit problem, his car was on fire, but he was able to remain in the race. The restart came out at lap 12. But one lap later, Paul Tracy had a serious crash at turn 4 resulting in the races second caution. It was Tracy's sixth DNF of the season. At lap 14, the top 6 were: Maurício Gugelmin, Jimmy Vasser, Bryan Herta, Michel Jourdain Jr., Michael Andretti and Mark Blundell. The restart came out at lap 23. At lap 40, German driver Arnd Meier spun at turn 4. Arie Luyendyk couldn't avoid him and he hit Arnd's car. Both drivers suffered slight injuries. At lap 47, Al Unser Jr. had a pit problem, just like Arie had laps before. He retired. The restart came out at lap 52, with Andretti leading the field.

=== Lap 59 - Lap 106 ===
The top 6 at lap 59 were: Michael Andretti, Maurício Gugelmin, Jimmy Vasser, André Ribeiro, Mark Blundell and Greg Moore. After pitstops, Ribeiro lead on lap 90. After 106 laps, Michael Andretti retired.

=== Lap 119 - 133 ===
The fourth caution came out at lap 119 because of debris. The restart came out at lap 126. At lap 133, the top 6 were: André Ribeiro, Gil de Ferran, Adrian Fernández, Jimmy Vasser, Greg Moore and Mark Blundell.

=== Closing stages: 98 laps to go until the finish ===
With 98 laps to go, Adrian Fernandez stalled in the pits, but kept the engine running, and remained in the race. With 47 laps to go, André Ribeiro's car ran out of fuel, but he was able to make it back to the pit area, very slow. He came back to the track in sixth, 1 lap behind. But 5 laps later, Ribeiro suffered a bad crash at turn 2 and stopped after crashing in the infield wall. He walked away but this brought out the races fifth caution. With 35 laps to go, Maurício Gugelmin took the lead, as the restart came out. With 32 laps to go the top 10 were: Maurício Gugelmin, Gil de Ferran, Jimmy Vasser, Greg Moore, Mark Blundell, Bobby Rahal, Adrian Fernandez, Christian Fittipaldi, Scott Pruett and Robby Gordon. With 19 laps to go, Gugelmin had tyre problems, and the new leader was Greg Moore, but 8 laps later, Greg Moore had flames on the back of his car. Jimmy Vasser thought the yellow flag was out, but that was not the case, as Mark Blundell took the lead. Blundell won for the last time in CART; his only oval win and only 500-mile race win. Jimmy Vasser would finish second.

== Box Score ==
| Finish | Grid | No | Name | Team | Chassis | Engine | Tire | Laps | Time/Status | Led | Points |
|---|---|---|---|---|---|---|---|---|---|---|---|
| 1 | 8 | 18 | (United Kingdom) Mark Blundell | PacWest Racing | Reynard 97I | Mercedes-Benz | F | 250 | 3:02:42.620 | 11 | 20 |
| 2 | 2 | 1 | (United States) Jimmy Vasser | Chip Ganassi Racing | Reynard 97I | Honda | F | 250 | +0.847 | 2 | 16 |
| 3 | 14 | 32 | (Mexico) Adrián Fernández | Tasman Motorsports | Lola T97/00 | Honda | F | 249 | +1 Lap | 0 | 14 |
| 4 | 1 | 17 | (Brazil) Maurício Gugelmin | PacWest Racing | Reynard 97I | Mercedes-Benz | F | 249 | +1 Lap | 66 | 13 |
| 5 | 10 | 7 | (United States) Bobby Rahal | Team Rahal | Reynard 97I | Ford | G | 249 | +1 Lap | 0 | 10 |
| 6 | 12 | 5 | (Brazil) Gil de Ferran | Walker Racing | Reynard 97I | Honda | G | 249 | +1 Lap | 9 | 8 |
| 7 | 4 | 20 | (United States) Scott Pruett | Patrick Racing | Reynard 97I | Ford | F | 248 | +2 Laps | 0 | 6 |
| 8 | 13 | 9 | (United States) Robby Gordon | Hogan Racing | Reynard 97I | Mercedes-Benz | F | 247 | +3 Laps | 0 | 5 |
| 9 | 16 | 11 | (Brazil) Christian Fittipaldi | Newman/Haas Racing | Swift 007.i | Ford | G | 247 | +3 Laps | 0 | 4 |
| 10 | 21 | 98 | (United States) P. J. Jones | All American Racers | Reynard 97I | Toyota | G | 244 | +6 Laps | 0 | 3 |
| 11 | 15 | 27 | (United States) Parker Johnstone | Team Green | Reynard 97I | Honda | F | 243 | +7 Laps | 0 | 2 |
| 12 | 25 | 25 | (Italy) Max Papis | Arciero-Wells Racing | Reynard 97I | Toyota | F | 242 | +8 Laps | 0 | 1 |
| 13 | 6 | 99 | (Canada) Greg Moore | Forsythe Racing | Reynard 97I | Mercedes-Benz | F | 240 | Engine | 8 | 0 |
| 14 | 26 | 77 | (Brazil) Gualter Salles | Davis Racing | Reynard 97I | Ford | G | 238 | +12 Laps | 0 | 0 |
| 15 | 22 | 21 | (United States) Richie Hearn | Della Penna Motorsports | Lola T97/00 | Ford | G | 238 | +12 Laps | 4 | 0 |
| 16 | 17 | 34 | (United States) Dennis Vitolo | Payton-Coyne Racing | Reynard 97I | Ford | F | 231 | +19 Laps | 0 | 0 |
| 17 | 11 | 31 | (Brazil) André Ribeiro | Tasman Motorsports | Reynard 97I | Honda | F | 207 | Crash | 114 | 1 |
| 18 | 5 | 19 | (Mexico) Michel Jourdain Jr. | Payton-Coyne Racing | Reynard 97I | Ford | F | 195 | Handling | 0 | 0 |
| 19 | 7 | 6 | (United States) Michael Andretti | Newman/Haas Racing | Swift 007.i | Ford | G | 104 | Overheating | 36 | 0 |
| 20 | 9 | 40 | (Brazil) Raul Boesel | Patrick Racing | Reynard 97I | Ford | F | 83 | Electrical | 0 | 0 |
| 21 | 3 | 8 | (United States) Bryan Herta | Team Rahal | Reynard 97I | Ford | G | 80 | Engine | 0 | 0 |
| 22 | 20 | 2 | (United States) Al Unser Jr. | Marlboro Team Penske | Penske PC-26 | Mercedes-Benz | G | 44 | Exhaust | 0 | 0 |
| 23 | 23 | 24 | (Japan) Hiro Matsushita | Arciero-Wells Racing | Reynard 97I | Toyota | F | 40 | Suspension damage | 0 | 0 |
| 24 | 27 | 4 | (Netherlands) Arie Luyendyk | Chip Ganassi Racing | Reynard 97I | Honda | F | 39 | Crash | 0 | 0 |
| 25 | 24 | 64 | (Germany) Arnd Meier | Project Indy | Lola T97/00 | Ford | G | 38 | Crash | 0 | 0 |
| 26 | 19 | 3 | (Canada) Paul Tracy | Marlboro Team Penske | Penske PC-26 | Mercedes-Benz | G | 12 | Crash | 0 | 0 |
| 27 | 18 | 36 | (Argentina) Juan Manuel Fangio II | All American Racers | Reynard 97I | Toyota | G | 0 | Engine | 0 | 0 |

Tires:

- F - Firestone
- G - Goodyear

=== Failed to qualify, withdrawn, or driver change ===
- Driver change: (Italy) Alex Zanardi (#4) - injured in practice crash, replaced by Arie Luyendyk
- Withdrawn: (Canada) Patrick Carpentier (#16) - practice crash

=== Race statistics ===
Lap Leaders
| Laps | Leader |
|---|---|
| 1–43 | Maurício Gugelmin |
| 44–47 | Richie Hearn |
| 48–83 | Michael Andretti |
| 84–87 | André Ribeiro |
| 88–89 | Jimmy Vasser |
| 90–161 | André Ribeiro |
| 162–163 | Gil de Ferran |
| 164–201 | André Ribeiro |
| 202–204 | Gil de Ferran |
| 205–210 | Maurício Gugelmin |
| 211–214 | Gil de Ferran |
| 215–231 | Maurício Gugelmin |
| 232–239 | Greg Moore |
| 240–250 | Mark Blundell |

== Point Standings ==
1. Alex Zanardi 195 points
2. Gil de Ferran 162 points
3. Jimmy Vasser 144 points
4. Maurício Gugelmin 132 points
5. Paul Tracy 121 points
6. Mark Blundell 115 points
7. Greg Moore 111 points
8. Michael Andretti 108 points
9. Scott Pruett 102 points
10. Raul Boesel 91 points
11. Bryan Herta 72 points
12. Bobby Rahal 70 points

== Rookie of the Year standings ==
1. Patrick Carpentier 27 points
2. Gualter Salles 10 points
3. Dario Franchitti 10 points
4. Arnd Meier 1 point

== Notes ==
1. Last win - Mark Blundell
2. Fastest lap - Greg Moore: 30.900 seconds
3. Last Race for Penske Racing - Paul Tracy
4. Last CART Race - Arie Luyendyk, Parker Johnstone, Juan Manuel Fangio II
5. Alex Zanardi was replaced by Arie Luyendyk after two bad crashes on free practice. Rookie of the year, Patrick Carpentier also did not start.
6. Robby Gordon replaced Dario Franchitti in this race.
