= 1999 Budweiser/G.I. Joe's 200 =

(United States) 1999 Portland
Race details
- Race 8 of 20 in the 1999 CART season
- Portland International Raceway
- Date: June 20, 1999
- Official name: 1999 Budweiser/G.I. Joe's 200
- Location: Portland International Raceway; Portland, Oregon, United States
- Course: Permanent road course 1.967 mi / 3.17 km
- Distance: 98 laps 192.766 mi / 310.66 km
- Weather: Dry

Pole position
- Driver: (Colombia) Juan Pablo Montoya (Chip Ganassi Racing)
- Time: 58.193

Fastest lap
- Driver: (United States) Michael Andretti (Newman-Haas Racing)
- Time: 59.749 (on lap 91 of 98)

Podium
- First: (Brazil) Gil de Ferran (Walker Racing)
- Second: (Colombia) Juan Pablo Montoya (Chip Ganassi Racing)
- Third: (United Kingdom) Dario Franchitti (Team KOOL Green)

The 1999 Budweiser/G.I. Joe's 200 was the eighth round of the 1999 CART FedEx Champ Car World Series season, held on June 20, 1999, on the Portland International Raceway in Portland, Oregon.

Gil de Ferran was the winner.

== Report ==
=== Race ===
Searching for his first career win, Hélio Castro-Neves took the lead at the start by going around the outside of polesitter Juan Pablo Montoya in Turn 1. Castro-Neves and Montoya built a gap to the rest of the field and raced on their own in the first stint, with Montoya taking the lead at the first round of pit stops. Castro-Neves stayed with him until an electrical failure slowed him down and ultimately made him retire. This left Montoya with a big lead, but a caution due to Richie Hearn's spin erased it, and Montoya then threw away the lead entirely by spinning at the restart. Gil de Ferran took the lead, but Montoya soon passed him and regained it back, but a slower second pit stop handed the lead back to de Ferran, with Montoya third behind Paul Tracy. Montoya immediately took a second from Tracy, with Dario Franchitti coming up to third. While Montoya, Franchitti, Tracy, and others were conserving fuel, de Ferran went flat out and built up a big enough lead to make a third pit stop for fuel and come out in front of Montoya. He took his first win in three years, with Montoya holding off Franchitti for the second.

== Classification ==
=== Race ===
Pos	No	Driver	Team	Laps	Time/Retired	Grid	Points
1	5	(Brazil) Gil de Ferran	Walker Racing	98	1:47:44.560	3	20+1
2	4	(Colombia) Juan Pablo Montoya	Chip Ganassi Racing	98	+4.393	1	16+1
3	27	(United Kingdom) Dario Franchitti	Team Green	98	+4.996	12	14
4	40	(Mexico) Adrián Fernández	Patrick Racing	98	+13.568	5	12
5	26	(Canada) Paul Tracy	Team Green	98	+20.293	6	10
6	8	(United States) Bryan Herta	Team Rahal	98	+27.931	4	8
7	18	(Brazil) Roberto Moreno	PacWest Racing	98	+28.450	11	6
8	7	(Italy) Max Papis	Team Rahal	98	+30.068	10	5
9	33	(Canada) Patrick Carpentier	Forsythe Racing	98	+30.388	8	4
10	6	(United States) Michael Andretti	Newman-Haas Racing	98	+41.911	14	3
11	25	(Brazil) Cristiano da Matta	Arciero-Wells Racing	98	+41.917	15	2
12	12	(United States) Jimmy Vasser	Chip Ganassi Racing	98	+43.385	7	1
13	99	(Canada) Greg Moore	Forsythe Racing	98	+44.888	13	
14	11	(Brazil) Christian Fittipaldi	Newman-Haas Racing	98	+52.044	9	
15	44	(Brazil) Tony Kanaan	Forsythe Racing	98	+59.048	17	
16	2	(United States) Al Unser Jr.	Team Penske	98	+59.689	26	
17	22	(United States) Robby Gordon	Team Gordon	98	+59.973	20	
18	3	(Brazil) Tarso Marques	Team Penske	97	+1 Lap	18	
19	15	(United States) Memo Gidley	Walker Racing	97	+1 Lap	25	
20	19	(Mexico) Michel Jourdain Jr.	Payton/Coyne Racing	96	+2 Laps	24	
21	20	(United States) P. J. Jones	Patrick Racing	95	+3 Laps	23	
22	10	(United States) Richie Hearn	Della Penna Motorsports	95	+3 Laps	21	
23	71	(Brazil) Luiz Garcia Jr.	Payton/Coyne Racing	95	+3 Laps	27	
24	24	(United States) Scott Pruett	Arciero-Wells Racing	43	Engine	19	
25	17	(Brazil) Maurício Gugelmin	PacWest Racing	42	Turbo	16	
26	9	(Brazil) Hélio Castro-Neves	Hogan Racing	40	Electrical	2	
27	36	(Brazil) Gualter Salles	All American Racing	10	Engine	22	
28	16	(Japan) Shigeaki Hattori	Bettenhausen Racing	8	Retired	28	

== Caution flags ==
Laps	Cause
48-51	Hearn (10) spin
52-54	Montoya (4) spin
60-62	Jones (20) spin

== Lap Leaders ==
Laps	Leader
1-30	Hélio Castro-Neves
31-50	Juan Pablo Montoya
51-54	Gil de Ferran
55-59	Juan Pablo Montoya
60-98	Gil de Ferran

Driver	Laps led
Gil de Ferran	43
Hélio Castro-Neves	30
Juan Pablo Montoya	25

== Point standings after race ==
Pos	Driver	Points
1	(Colombia) Juan Pablo Montoya	90
2	(United Kingdom) Dario Franchitti	85
3	(Brazil) Gil de Ferran	71
4	(Canada) Greg Moore	69
5	(Mexico) Adrián Fernández	65
