= 1997 CART PPG World Series =

American motorsport season

1997 CART season
- PPG CART World Series

Season
- Races: 17
- Start date: March 2
- End date: September 28

Awards
- Drivers' champion: (Italy) Alex Zanardi
- Constructors' Cup: (United Kingdom) Reynard
- Manufacturers' Cup: (Germany) Mercedes
- Nations' Cup: United States
- Rookie of the Year: (Canada) Patrick Carpentier

The 1997 CART PPG World Series season was the nineteenth in the Championship Auto Racing Teams (CART) era of American open-wheel car racing. It consisted of 17 races, beginning in Homestead, Florida on March 2 and concluding in Fontana, California on September 28. The PPG CART World Series Drivers' Champion was Alex Zanardi. Rookie of the Year was Patrick Carpentier. Mercedes-Benz won their first and only CART engine-manufacturer's title.

After a settlement with the Indianapolis Motor Speedway, CART relinquished its license of the "IndyCar" trademark for 1997 and beyond. As a result, the series was renamed for the first time since 1980. The CART term, which had been mostly eschewed since 1992, was brought back and embraced, a new logo was unveiled, and participants were encouraged to refer to the machines of the CART series as "Champ Cars". The revival of the historic term (and curtailing the use of the mostly generic term "Indy cars") helped to differentiate the machines from those of the rival Indy Racing League, and was part of a concerted and necessary effort to distance the series from the Indianapolis 500, to which it no longer had any link. This was also the last year of title sponsorship by PPG Industries, although the Driver's Championship continued to be known as the PPG Cup until 1999. This was the first season since 1983 not to feature Emerson Fittipaldi.

== Drivers and constructors ==
The following teams and drivers competed in the 1997 CART World Series season.

Team	Chassis	Engine	Tires	No	Drivers	Rounds	Primary Sponsors
(United States) Target Chip Ganassi	Reynard 97I	Honda HRR	F	1	(United States) Jimmy Vasser	All	Target
(United States) Target Chip Ganassi	Reynard 97I	Honda HRR	F	4	(Italy) Alex Zanardi	1–16	Target
(United States) Target Chip Ganassi	Reynard 97I	Honda HRR	F	4	(Netherlands) Arie Luyendyk	17	Target
(United States) Marlboro Team Penske	Penske PC-26-97	Ilmor-Mercedes; IC108D	G	2	(United States) Al Unser Jr.	All	Marlboro
(United States) Marlboro Team Penske	Penske PC-26-97	Ilmor-Mercedes; IC108D	G	3	(Canada) Paul Tracy	All	Marlboro
(United States) Walker Racing	Reynard 97I	Honda HRR	G	5	(Brazil) Gil de Ferran	All	Valvoline
(United States) Newman-Haas Racing	Swift 007.i	Ford XD	G	6	(United States) Michael Andretti	All	Texaco-Havoline
(United States) Newman-Haas Racing	Swift 007.i	Ford XD	G	11	(Brazil) Christian Fittipaldi	1–2, 9–17	Budweiser
(United States) Newman-Haas Racing	Swift 007.i	Ford XD	G	11	(Brazil) Roberto Moreno	3–8	Budweiser
(United States) Team Rahal	Reynard 97I	Ford XD	G	7	(United States) Bobby Rahal	All	Miller Lite
(United States) Team Rahal	Reynard 97I	Ford XD	G	8	(United States) Bryan Herta	All	Shell
(United States) Hogan Racing	Reynard 97I	Mercedes IC108D	F	9	(United Kingdom) Dario Franchitti (R)	1–16	Hogan Racing
(United States) Hogan Racing	Reynard 97I	Mercedes IC108D	F	9	(United States) Robby Gordon	17	Hogan Racing
(United States) Bettenhausen Racing	Reynard 97I	Mercedes IC108D	G	16	(Canada) Patrick Carpentier (R)	1–14, 17	Alumax
(United States) Bettenhausen Racing	Reynard 97I	Mercedes IC108D	G	16	(Brazil) Roberto Moreno	15–16	Alumax
(United States) PacWest	Reynard 97I	Mercedes IC108D	F	17	(Brazil) Maurício Gugelmin	All	Hollywood Cigarettes
(United States) PacWest	Reynard 97I	Mercedes IC108D	F	18	(United Kingdom) Mark Blundell	All	Motorola
(United States) Payton/Coyne Racing	Reynard 97I	Ford XD	G	19	(Mexico) Michel Jourdain Jr.	11, 14, 16	Herdez
(United States) Payton/Coyne Racing	Lola T97/00	Ford XD	G	19	(Mexico) Michel Jourdain Jr.	1–10, 12–13, 15, 17	Herdez
(United States) Payton/Coyne Racing	Lola T97/00	Ford XD	G	34	(Brazil) Roberto Moreno	1	Data Control
(United States) Payton/Coyne Racing	Lola T97/00	Ford XD	G	34	(United States) Paul Jasper (R)	2–7	Hype
(United States) Payton/Coyne Racing	Lola T97/00	Ford XD	G	34	(Germany) Christian Danner	8–9	Payton/Coyne Racing
(United States) Payton/Coyne Racing	Lola T97/00	Ford XD	G	34	(United States) Charlie Nearburg (R)	10, 13	Nearburg Exploration
(United States) Payton/Coyne Racing	Lola T97/00	Ford XD	G	34	(United States) Dennis Vitolo	11–12	Payton/Coyne Racing
(United States) Payton/Coyne Racing	Reynard 97I	Ford XD	G	34	(United States) Charlie Nearburg (R)	14, 16	Nearburg Exploration
(United States) Payton/Coyne Racing	Reynard 97I	Ford XD	G	34	(Germany) Christian Danner	15	Payton/Coyne Racing
(United States) Payton/Coyne Racing	Reynard 97I	Ford XD	G	34	(United States) Dennis Vitolo	17	SmithKline Beecham
(United States) Patrick Racing	Reynard 97I	Ford XD	F	20	(United States) Scott Pruett	All	Brahma
(United States) Patrick Racing	Reynard 97I	Ford XD	F	40	(Brazil) Raul Boesel	All	Brahma
(United States) Della Penna Motorsports	Lola T97/00	Ford XD	G	21	(United States) Richie Hearn	1–16	Ralphs
(United States) Della Penna Motorsports	Swift 007.i	Ford XD	G	21	(United States) Richie Hearn	17	Ralphs
(United States) Arciero-Wells Racing	Reynard 97I	Toyota RV8B	F	24	(Japan) Hiro Matsushita	All	Panasonic
(United States) Arciero-Wells Racing	Reynard 97I	Toyota RV8B	F	25	(Italy) Max Papis	All	MCI Worldcom
(United States) Team KOOL Green	Reynard 97I	Honda HRR	F	27	(United States) Parker Johnstone	All	KOOL
(United States) Tasman Motorsports	Reynard 97I	Honda HRR	F	31	(Brazil) André Ribeiro	10–17	LCI Communications
(United States) Tasman Motorsports	Lola T97/00	Honda HRR	F	31	(Brazil) André Ribeiro	1–9	LCI Communications
(United States) Tasman Motorsports	Lola T97/00	Honda HRR	F	32	(Mexico) Adrian Fernández	All	Tecate
(United States) All American Racing	Reynard 96I; Reynard 97I	Toyota RV8B	G	36	(Argentina) Juan Manuel Fangio II	All	Castrol
(United States) All American Racing	Reynard 96I; Reynard 97I	Toyota RV8B	G	98	(United States) P. J. Jones	All	Castrol
(United States) Project Indy	Lola T97/00	Ford XD	G	64	(United States) Dennis Vitolo	1, 3–4, 15–16	SmithKline Beecham
(United States) Project Indy	Lola T97/00	Ford XD	G	64	(Germany) Arnd Meier (R)	2, 5–6, 8–14, 17	Hasseröder
(United States) Davis Racing	Reynard 97I	Ford XD	G	77	(Brazil) Gualter Salles (R)	All	Davis Racing 2 Indusval 15
(United States) Forsythe Racing	Reynard 96I; Reynard 97I	Mercedes IC108D	F	99	(Canada) Greg Moore	All	Player's

== Schedule ==
Icon	Legend
O	Oval/Speedway
R	Road course
S	Street circuit

Rnd	Date	Race Name	Circuit	Location	TV Broadcaster
1	March 2	(United States) Marlboro Grand Prix of Miami	O Homestead Motorsports Complex	Homestead, Florida	ABC
2	April 6	(Australia) Sunbelt IndyCarnival	S Surfers Paradise Street Circuit	Surfers Paradise, Australia	ABC
3	April 13	(United States) Toyota Grand Prix of Long Beach	S Streets of Long Beach	Long Beach, California	ABC
4	April 27	(United States) Bosch Spark Plug Grand Prix	O Nazareth Speedway	Nazareth, Pennsylvania	ABC
5	May 11	(Brazil) Hollywood Rio 400K	O Autódromo de Jacarepaguá	Rio de Janeiro, Brazil	ABC
6	May 24	(United States) Motorola 300	O Gateway International Raceway	Madison, Illinois	ABC
7	June 1	(United States) Miller 200	O Milwaukee Mile	West Allis, Wisconsin	ESPN
8	June 8	(United States) ITT Automotive Detroit Grand Prix	S The Raceway on Belle Isle Park	Detroit, Michigan	ABC
9	June 22	(United States) Budweiser/G. I. Joe's 200	R Portland International Raceway	Portland, Oregon	ESPN
10	July 13	(United States) Medic Drug Grand Prix of Cleveland	S Cleveland Burke Lakefront Airport	Cleveland, Ohio	ABC
11	July 20	(Canada) Molson Indy Toronto	S Exhibition Place	Toronto, Ontario	ABC
12	July 27	(United States) U.S. 500	O Michigan Speedway	Brooklyn, Michigan	ABC
13	August 10	(United States) Miller 200	R Mid-Ohio Sports Car Course	Lexington, Ohio	ABC
14	August 17	(United States) Texaco/Havoline 200	R Road America	Elkhart Lake, Wisconsin	ESPN
15	August 31	(Canada) Molson Indy Vancouver	S Streets of Vancouver	Vancouver, British Columbia	ESPN
16	September 7	(United States) Toyota Grand Prix of Monterey	R Laguna Seca Raceway	Monterey, California	ESPN
17	September 28	(United States) Marlboro 500	O California Speedway	Fontana, California	ESPN

* The Australian Indy Grand Prix was supposed to run 182 miles, but was shortened due to time constraints.
* Portland was supposed to be 193 miles, but was shortened due to rain.

== Results ==
Rnd	Race	Pole position	Fastest lap	Race Winner				Race time	Report
Rnd	Race	Pole position	Fastest lap	Driver	Team	Chassis	Engine	Race time	Report
1	(United States) Homestead	(Italy) Alex Zanardi	(United States) Michael Andretti	(United States) Michael Andretti	Newman/Haas Racing	Swift	Ford	1:38:45	Report
2	(Australia) Surfers Paradise	(Italy) Alex Zanardi	(Italy) Alex Zanardi	(United States) Scott Pruett	Patrick Racing	Reynard	Ford	2:01:04	Report
3	(United States) Long Beach	(Brazil) Gil de Ferran	(Italy) Alex Zanardi	(Italy) Alex Zanardi	Target Chip Ganassi	Reynard	Honda	1:46:17	Report
4	(United States) Nazareth	(Canada) Paul Tracy	(Canada) Paul Tracy	(Canada) Paul Tracy	Marlboro Team Penske	Penske	Mercedes	1:53:31	Report
5	(Brazil) Rio	(Brazil) Maurício Gugelmin	(Brazil) Gil de Ferran	(Canada) Paul Tracy	Marlboro Team Penske	Penske	Mercedes	2:10:47	Report
6	(United States) Gateway	(Brazil) Raul Boesel	(United Kingdom) Dario Franchitti	(Canada) Paul Tracy	Marlboro Team Penske	Penske	Mercedes	2:37:54	Report
7	(United States) Milwaukee	(Canada) Paul Tracy	(Canada) Paul Tracy	(Canada) Greg Moore	Forsythe Racing	Reynard	Mercedes	1:43:32	Report
8	(United States) Belle Isle	(Brazil) Gil de Ferran	(United Kingdom) Dario Franchitti	(Canada) Greg Moore	Forsythe Racing	Reynard	Mercedes	1:52:45	Report
9	(United States) Portland	(United States) Scott Pruett	(Brazil) Raul Boesel	(United Kingdom) Mark Blundell	PacWest	Reynard	Mercedes	2:00:12	Report
10	(United States) Cleveland	(Italy) Alex Zanardi	(Italy) Alex Zanardi	(Italy) Alex Zanardi	Target Chip Ganassi	Reynard	Honda	1:41:40	Report
11	(Canada) Toronto	(United Kingdom) Dario Franchitti	(United Kingdom) Mark Blundell	(United Kingdom) Mark Blundell	PacWest	Reynard	Mercedes	1:45:43	Report
12	(United States) Michigan	(United States) Scott Pruett	(Brazil) Maurício Gugelmin	(Italy) Alex Zanardi	Target Chip Ganassi	Reynard	Honda	2:59:35	Report
13	(United States) Mid-Ohio	(United States) Bryan Herta	(Italy) Alex Zanardi	(Italy) Alex Zanardi	Target Chip Ganassi	Reynard	Honda	1:41:16	Report
14	(United States) Road America	(Brazil) Maurício Gugelmin	(Italy) Alex Zanardi	(Italy) Alex Zanardi	Target Chip Ganassi	Reynard	Honda	1:57:54	Report
15	(Canada) Vancouver	(Italy) Alex Zanardi	(Italy) Alex Zanardi	(Brazil) Maurício Gugelmin	PacWest	Reynard	Mercedes	1:47:17	Report
16	(United States) Laguna Seca	(United States) Bryan Herta	(United Kingdom) Mark Blundell	(United States) Jimmy Vasser	Target Chip Ganassi	Reynard	Honda	1:41:38	Report
17	(United States) Fontana	(Brazil) Maurício Gugelmin	(Canada) Greg Moore	(United Kingdom) Mark Blundell	PacWest	Reynard	Mercedes	3:02:42	Report

=== Final driver standings ===
Pos	Driver	HOM (United States)	SUR (Australia)	LBH (United States)	NAZ (United States)	RIO (Brazil)	GTW (United States)	MIL (United States)	BEL (United States)	POR (United States)	CLE (United States)	TOR (Canada)	MIS (United States)	MOH (United States)	ROA (United States)	VAN (Canada)	LAG (United States)	CAL (United States)	Pts
1	(Italy) Alex Zanardi	**7**	**4**	1*	11	4	4	13	26	11	**1**	2	1*	1*	1	**4**	3	Wth	195
2	(Brazil) Gil de Ferran	22	5	**21**	4	11	3	7	**3***	2	2*	25	3	6	3	3	5	6	162
3	(United States) Jimmy Vasser	3	12	9	5	9	5	3	4	19	13	7	24	5	8	2*	1*	2	144
4	(Brazil) Maurício Gugelmin	6	17	2	9	**22**	6	5	16	6*	15	6	6	7	**2**	1	9	**4**	132
5	(Canada) Paul Tracy	2	19*	7	**1***	1	1	**6**	DNS	7	7	10	4	27	28	28	26	26	121
6	(United Kingdom) Mark Blundell	14	8	13	19	8	24	12	17	1	9	1*	2	26	16*	7	2	1	115
7	(Canada) Greg Moore	4	2	23	16	2	13	1*	1	5	24	23	27	2	18	17	24	13	111
8	(United States) Michael Andretti	1*	3	22	2	21	11*	2	2	8	23	4	21	8	26	16	27	19	108
9	(United States) Scott Pruett	5	1	3	10	3	19	9	24	**17**	8	5	**14**	9	5	18	16	7	102
10	(Brazil) Raul Boesel	17	7	8	8	5	**14**	4	6	3	16	8	18	4	21	6	8	20	91
11	(United States) Bryan Herta	10	22	6	7	6	22	15	7	21	3	17	5	**24**	11	8	**6**	21	72
12	(United States) Bobby Rahal	16	10	10	6	10*	20	11	9	24	5	9	17	3	6	24	19	5	70
13	(United States) Al Unser Jr.	27	27	4	3	7	18	20	8	25	4	20	20	22	7	5	11	22	67
14	(Brazil) André Ribeiro	12	6	14	26	15	10	26	25	13	14	3	23	10	22	10	4	17*	45
15	(Brazil) Christian Fittipaldi	26	28							4	6	11	16	21	4	9	21	9	42
16	(United States) Parker Johnstone	8	21	5	17	12	7	25	20	9	10	12	25	12	23	11	12	11	36
17	(Canada) Patrick Carpentier RY	9	15	15	12	28	2	8	15	16	12	16	15	15	27			Wth	27
18	(Mexico) Adrián Fernández	13	11	11	23	26	8	24	27	10	17	14	26	23	12	19	23	3	27
19	(Brazil) Roberto Moreno	24		24	14	18	25	10	5							15	10		16
20	(Brazil) Gualter Salles R	15	24	18	24	19	12	22	21	23	19	18	10	20	13	26	7	14	10
21	(United States) Richie Hearn	11	13	27	18	14	9	23	23	14	28	27	22	13	9	22	25	15	10
22	(United Kingdom) Dario Franchitti R	25	9	12	13	27	17	16	13	26	11	**26**	19	11	25	13	13		10
23	(Argentina) Juan Manuel Fangio II	20	20	26	15	20	23	21	10	22	21	19	11	25	10	12	15	27	9
24	(Italy) Max Papis	19	14	25	22	13	26	19	11	28	27	15	8	14	15	20	14	12	8
25	(United States) Dennis Vitolo	23		DNS	DNQ							28	7			27	20	16	6
26	(United States) Robby Gordon																	8	5
27	(Japan) Hiro Matsushita	21	25	20	25	23	15	17	19	15	20	22	9	19	24	14	28	23	4
28	(United States) P. J. Jones	28	26	16	21	16	21	14	14	20	25	21	28	17	14	25	17	10	3
29	(Mexico) Michel Jourdain Jr.	18	18	17	20	17	16	27	22	12	18	13	13	18	20	21	22	18	1
30	(Germany) Arnd Meier R		16			25	DNS		18	18	22	24	12	16	19			25	1
31	(Germany) Christian Danner								12	27						23			1
32	(United States) Charlie Nearburg R										26			28	17		18		0
33	(United States) Paul Jasper R		23	19	DNQ	24	Wth	18											0
34	(Netherlands) Arie Luyendyk																	24	0
Pos	Driver	HOM (United States)	SUR (Australia)	LBH (United States)	NAZ (United States)	RIO (Brazil)	GTW (United States)	MIL (United States)	BEL (United States)	POR (United States)	CLE (United States)	TOR (Canada)	MIS (United States)	MOH (United States)	ROA (United States)	VAN (Canada)	LAG (United States)	CAL (United States)	Pts

Color	Result
Gold	Winner
Silver	2nd place
Bronze	3rd place
Green	4th–6th place
Light Blue	7th–12th place
Dark Blue	Finished (Outside Top 12)
Purple	Did not finish
Red	Did not qualify (DNQ)
Brown	Withdrawn (Wth)
Black	Disqualified (DSQ)
White	Did not start (DNS)
Blank	Did not participate (DNP)
Blank	Not competing

**In-line notation**
**Bold**	Pole position
Italics	Ran fastest race lap
*	Led most race laps
RY	Rookie of the Year
R	Rookie

=== Nations' Cup ===
- Top result per race counts towards Nations' Cup.

Pos	Country	Pts
1	United States	252
2	Brazil	238
3	Italy	198
4	Canada	190
5	England	115
6	Mexico	27
7	Scotland	10
8	Argentina	9
9	Japan	4
10	Germany	2
11	Netherlands	0
Pos	Country	Pts

=== Chassis Constructors' Cup ===
Pos	Chassis	Pts	Wins
1	(United Kingdom) Reynard 97I/96I	346	13
2	(United States) Penske PC-26	156	3
3	(United States) Swift 007.i	143	1
4	(United Kingdom) Lola T9700	45	0
Pos	Chassis	Pts	Wins

=== Engine Manufacturers' Cup ===
Pos	Engine	Pts	Wins
1	(Germany) Mercedes	316	9
2	(Japan) Honda	290	6
3	(United States) Ford XD/XB	230	2
4	(Japan) Toyota	15	0
Pos	Engine	Pts	Wins

== See also ==
- 1997 Toyota Atlantic Championship season
- 1997 Indianapolis 500
- 1996–97 Indy Racing League
- 1997 Indy Lights season
- Super Speedway
- CART World Series

== Bibliography ==
- Shaw, Jeremy, ed. (1997). Autocourse Cart World Series 1997-98: Official Yearbook. Richmond, Surrey: Hazleton Publishing. ISBN 978-1-874557-62-3.
