= Juan Manuel Fangio II =

Argentine racing driver (born 1956)

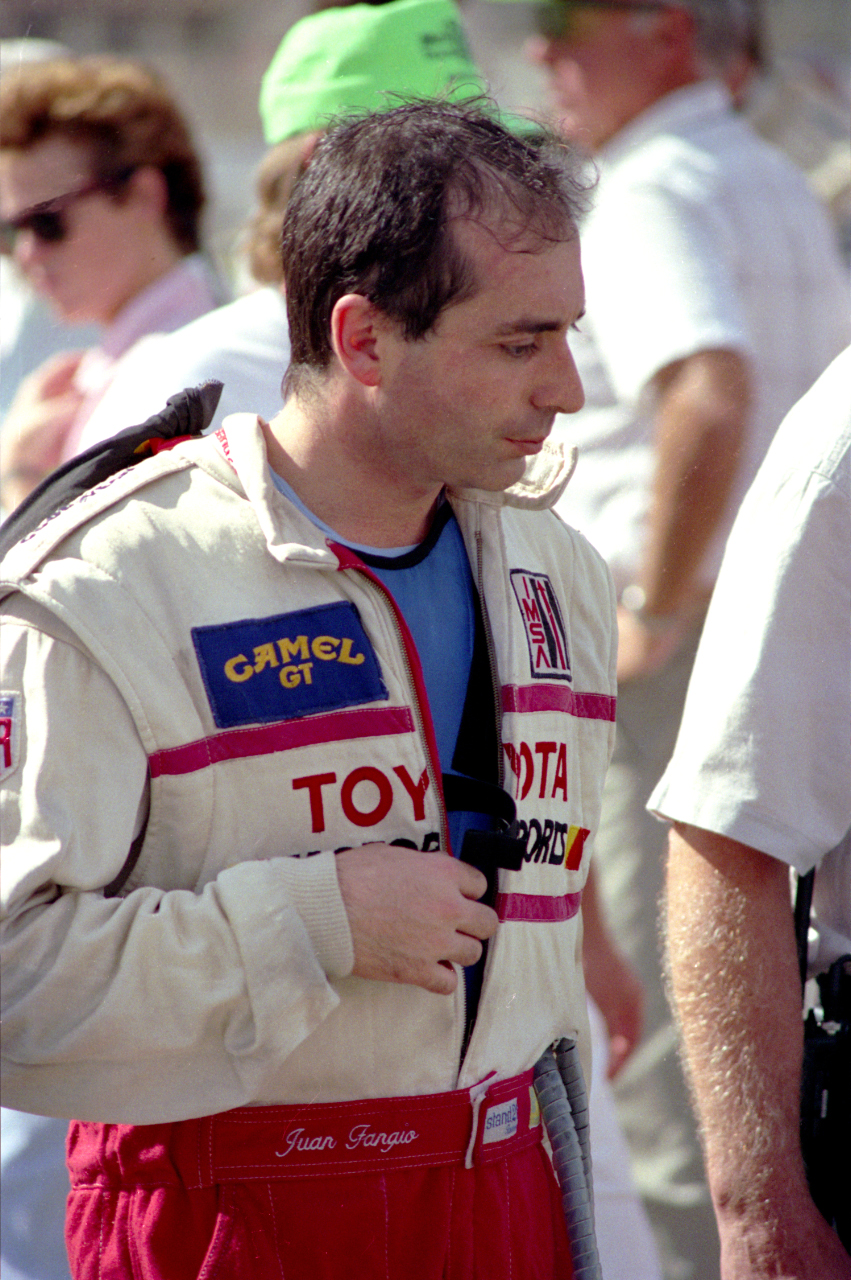
- Fangio at the 1990 IMSA Del Mar Grand Prix
- Full name: Juan Manuel Fangio II
- Born: September 19, 1956 (age 70) Balcarce, Buenos Aires, Argentina

Awards
- 1992 & 1993 IMSA GT Champion

Champ Car career
- 37 races run over 3 years
- Years active: 1995-1997
- Best finish: 23rd (1996 & 1997)
- First race: 1995 Miller Genuine Draft 200 (Mid-Ohio)
- Last race: 1997 Marlboro 500 (California Speedway)

Juan Manuel Fangio II (born 19 September 1956) is an Argentine former auto racing driver. He is the nephew of five-time Formula One champion Juan Manuel Fangio.

After some experience in European Formula Three, Fangio debuted as a professional auto racer in IMSA in 1984 in the Miami Grand Prix in a Porsche 935 with Hugo Gralia. He had an award-winning career, winning two GTP driver's championships, as well as 2 manufacturer titles when he was racing for Toyota and All American Racers. Fangio further established his legacy in the world of auto racing by winning the prestigious 12 Hours of Sebring two times (as did his uncle), posting 21 GTP wins, and establishing an IMSA record with 19 solo victories. His victories came while driving the Eagle HF89/90 and Eagle MkIII GTP cars.

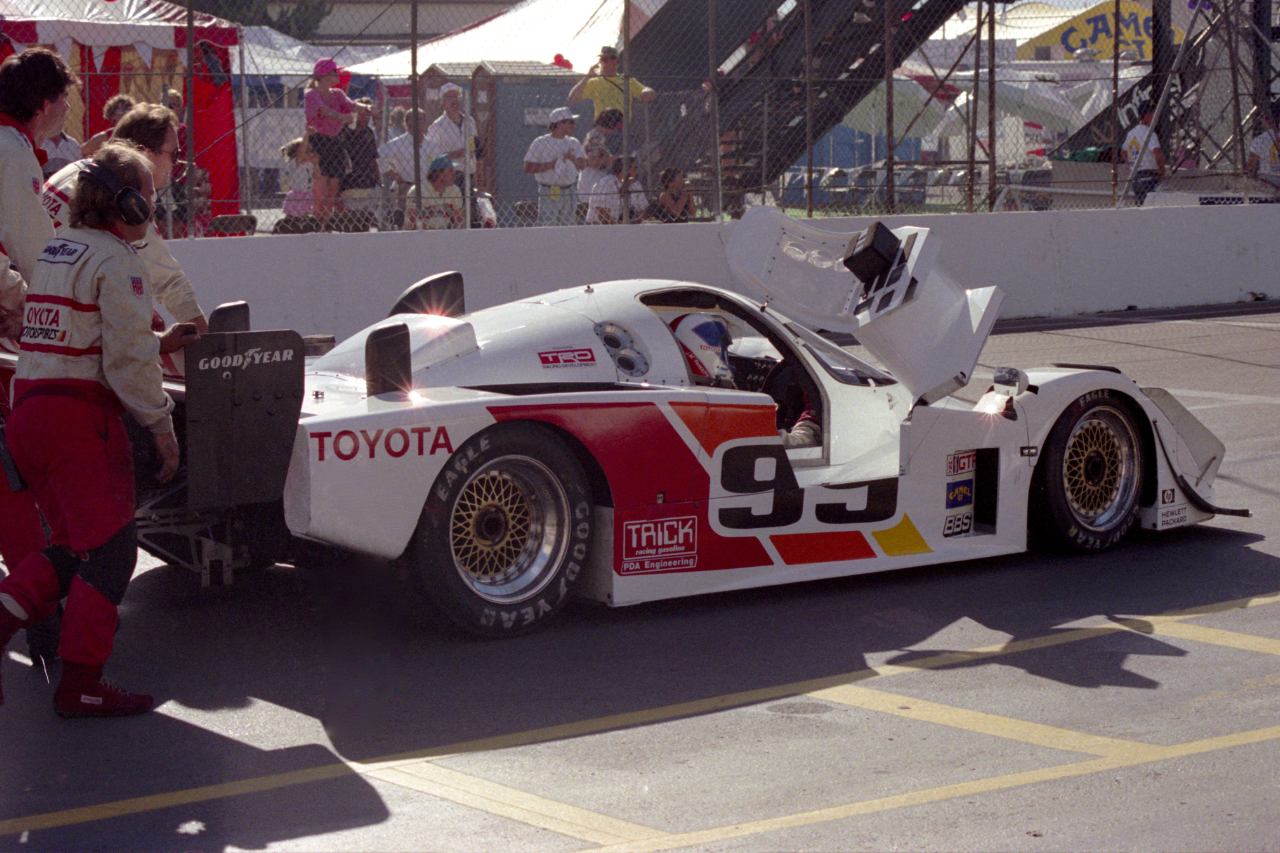
Fangio's 1990 IMSA GTP car

Fangio won ten pole positions during his career. He made most of his driving career in the United States and was chosen in 1992 and 1993 as an "All-American" by the American Auto Racing Writers and Broadcasters Association (AARWBA), an organization which also named Fangio their 1992 driver of the year. He also participated in the CART series, but did not win any races, a fact that he regretted.

Fangio's boss, and also a personal friend, was Dan Gurney. In 1997, Fangio called Gurney to let him know that he was retiring from CART competition. He told Gurney, "I have discovered that regardless of what my passion says, despite what I command my mind to do, I am no longer able to give my whole being, my total focus at the exclusion of everything else to this sport that I love. 99% is not enough, I shall stop." Gurney described Fangio as "A gentleman in a driver's suit with a core of steel exuding an aura of Latin American dignity and honor even in the worst of circumstances will be missing from the grid".

Fangio returned home in 1998 to race in the South American Super Touring Car Championship. He finished fifth in the standings with one win and five podiums at the wheel of a Peugeot 406. Shortly after, he retired from motorsports after a final appearance at the 12 Hours of Sebring in 1999 with a Ferrari 333 SP, finishing in sixth place for Doyle-Risi Racing.

Fangio currently resides in his hometown of Balcarce, Argentina.

== Career results ==
=== Complete International Formula 3000 results ===
(key) (Races in bold indicate pole position; races in italics indicate fastest lap.)

Year	Entrant	1	2	3	4	5	6	7	8	9	10	11	12	Pos.	Pts
1985	Corbari Italia	SIL	THR; Ret	EST; 11	NÜR; C	VAL; Ret	PAU; Ret	SPA; 6	DIJ; 14	PER; Ret	ÖST	ZAN	DON	16th	1

=== Complete 24 Hours of Le Mans results ===
Year	Class	No	Tyres	Car	Team	Co-Drivers	Laps	Pos.	Class Pos.
1993	C1	38	**M**	Toyota TS010; Toyota RV10 3.5L V10	(Japan) Toyota Team Tom's	(United Kingdom) Geoff Lees (Netherlands) Jan Lammers	353	8th	5th

=== Complete IMSA GTP results ===
(key)

Year	Team	1	2	3	4	5	6	7	8	9	10	11	12	13	14	15	Rank	Points
1989	All American Racers	D24	MIA; 18	S12; DNS	ATL	WPB	LRP; 18	MDO; 5	WGI; 3	ROA; 5	PDX; 11	HPT	SAN; 2	SON; 5	TPA; 23	DLM	**13th**	**53**
1990	All American Racers	D24; 35	MIA	S12; 25	ATL; 3	WPB; 13	**HPT**; 1	LRP; 5	MDO; 15	WGI; 11	SON; 1	POR; 13	ROA; 3	SAN; 1	TPA; 6	DLM; 1	**4th**	**115**
1991	All American Racers	D24; 42	WPB; 8	S12; 18	MIA; 25	ATL; DNS	HPT; 4	LRP; 2	MDO; 7	NOR; 16	WGI; 1	LS; 7	POR; 1	ROA; 19	DLM; 1		**5th**	**107**
1992	All American Racers	**D24**; 11	MIA; 14	S12; 1	ATL; 14	LRP; 1	MDO; 2	**NOR**; 1	WGI; 1	LS; 1	**POR**; 2	**ROA**; 1	PHO; 1	**DLM**; 19			**1st**	**215**
1993	All American Racers	D24; 27	**MIA**; 1	**S12**; 1	AMS; 1	LRP; 1	MDO; 1	WGI; 1	ROA	LS; 2	**POR**; 1	PHO; 2					**1st**	**183**

=== American Open-Wheel racing results ===
(key)

==== Indy Lights ====
Year	Team	1	2	3	4	5	6	7	8	9	10	11	12	Rank	Points	Ref
1986	Ralph Sanchez Racing	PHX1	MIL	MEA; 11	TOR; 7	POC; 7								**5th**	**69**	
1986	ProMotion / Manliba						MDO; 8	**ROA**; 11	LS; 3	PHX2; 2	MIA; 2			**5th**	**69**	
1987	TEAMKAR International	PHX; 3	MIL; 7	MEA; 11	CLE	TOR	POC	MDO; 3	NZR	LS	MIA; 1			**7th**	**57**	
1988	TEAMKAR International	PHX	MIL	POR; 2	**CLE**; 1	TOR	MEA; 12							**5th**	**69**	
1988	Leading Edge Motorsport							POC; 4	MDO; 13	ROA; 1	NZR	**LS**; 3	**MIA**; 2	**5th**	**69**	

==== CART ====
Year	Team	Chassis	Engine	1	2	3	4	5	6	7	8	9	10	11	12	13	14	15	16	17	Rank	Points	Ref
1995	PacWest Racing	Reynard 95i	Ford XB V8t	MIA	SRF	PHX	LBH	NZR	INDY	MIL	DET	POR	ROA	TOR	CLE	MIS	MDO; 7	NHM; 15	VAN; 28	LS; 13	**24th**	**6**	
1996	All American Racers	Eagle Mk-V	Toyota RV8A V8t	MIA; 21	RIO; 17	SRF; 15	LBH; 25	NZR; 25	500; 22	MIL; 19	DET; 18	POR; 14	CLE; 13	TOR; 28	MIS; 14	MDO; 20	ROA; 8	VAN; 19	LS; 28		**23rd**	**5**	
1997	All American Racers	Reynard 96i	Toyota RV8A V8t	MIA; 20	SRF; 20	LBH; 26	NZR; 15														**23rd**	**9**	
1997	All American Racers	Reynard 97i	Toyota RV8B V8t					RIO; 20	STL; 23	MIL; 21	DET; 10	POR; 22	CLE; 21	TOR; 19	MIS; 11	MDO; 25	ROA; 10	VAN; 12	LS; 15	FON; 27	**23rd**	**9**	

=== Complete American Le Mans Series results ===
Year	Entrant	Class	Chassis	Engine	Tyres	1	2	3	4	5	6	7	8	Rank	Points	Ref
1999	Doyle-Risi Racing	LMP	Ferrari 333 SP	Ferrari F310E 4.0 L V12	**P**	SEB ovr:6 cls:6	ATL	MOS	SON	POR	PET	MON	LSV	90th	0	

=== International Race of Champions ===
(key) (Bold – Pole position. * – Most laps led.)

International Race of Champions results
Year	Make	1	2	3	4	Pos.	Points	Ref
1993	Dodge	**DAY**; 10	DAR; 6	TAL; 5	MCH	10th	27	

Sporting positions
Preceded by Geoff Brabham	IMSA GT champion 1992–1993	Succeeded by Wayne Taylor
