= Penske PC-26 =

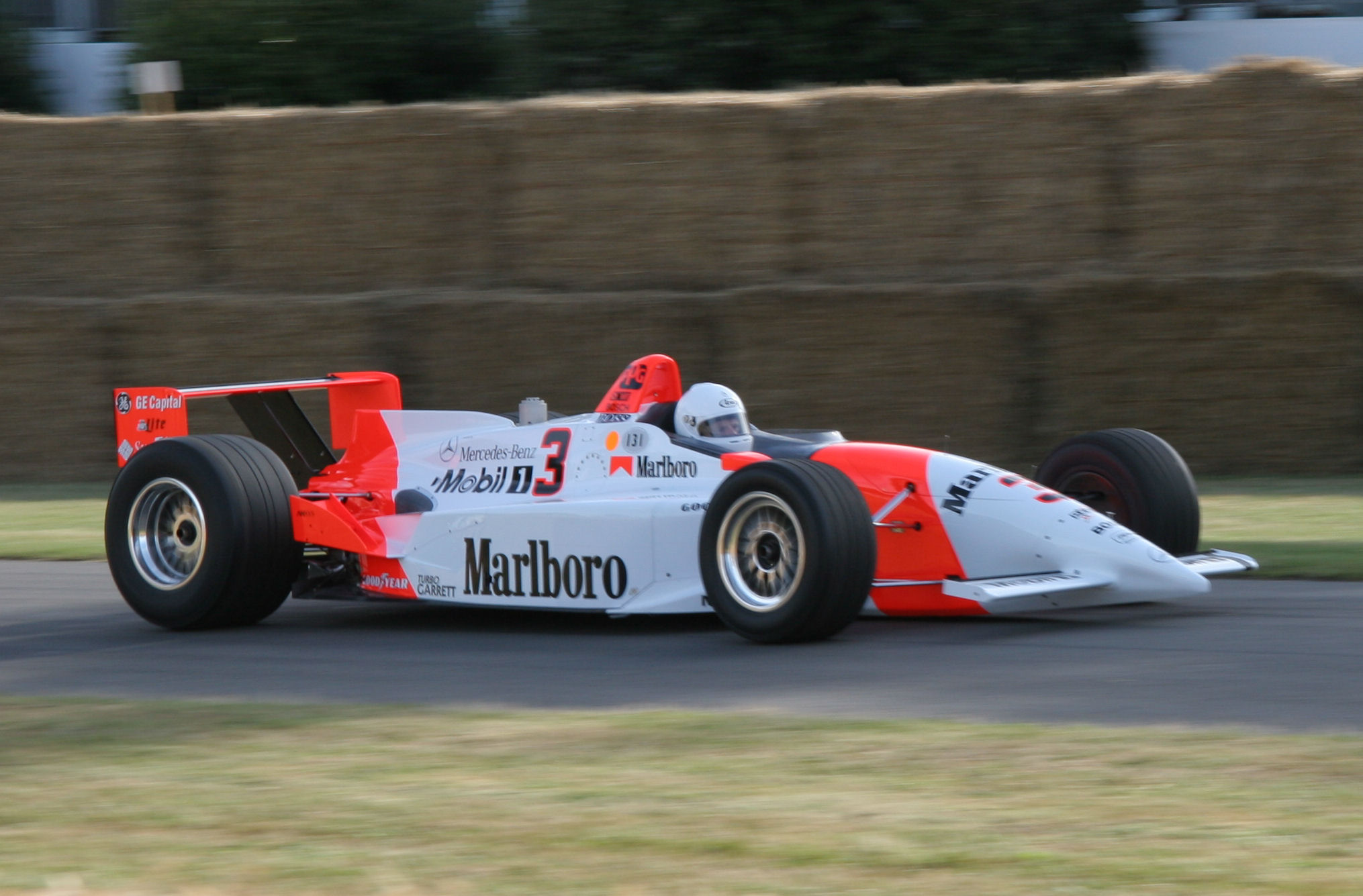
Paul Tracy's 1997 Penske PC-26 Champ Car at the 2006 Goodwood Festival of Speed

The Penske PC-26 was an open-wheel racecar designed by Nigel Bennett and manufactured by Penske Cars in Poole, Dorset, that was used by Team Penske to compete in the 1997 CART Championship. Whilst a development of the PC-25, the PC-26 was designed to address the twitchy nature of the previous year's car.

Five chassis were produced and driven by Al Unser Jr. and Paul Tracy. The Ilmor-produced 850 bhp Mercedes-Benz IC108D engine served as the powerplant, driving through an Xtrac gearbox within a Penske housing. Aerodynamic changes from the previous year's car included revised sidepod inlets and a longer, sharper nose. The Delco Gen V electronics package was carried over from 1996 and remained a Penske-exclusive system.

The PC26 proved to be a formidable short oval car, Paul Tracy recorded three victories in Rio, Nazareth and Gateway. The victory at Gateway marked the 99th for the team and the final victory for a Penske Cars-produced chassis. Penske Racing would have to wait three years to gain its 100th victory. The latter part of the season saw a variety of problems including an eye problem for Tracy as well as a lack of raw pace.

== Complete CART World Series results ==
(key) (Results in bold indicate pole position; results in italics indicate fastest lap)

Year	Team	Engine	Tyres	Driver	No.	1	2	3	4	5	6	7	8	9	10	11	12	13	14	15	16	17	Points	D.C.
1997	Marlboro Team Penske	Mercedes-Benz IC108D V8t	**G**			MIA	SUR	LBH	NAZ	RIO	GAT	MIL	DET	POR	CLE	TOR	MIC	MDO	ROA	VAN	LAG	FON		
1997	Marlboro Team Penske	Mercedes-Benz IC108D V8t	**G**	(United States) Al Unser Jr.	2	27	27	4	3	7	18	20	8	25	4	20	20	22	7	5	11	22	**67**	**13th**
1997	Marlboro Team Penske	Mercedes-Benz IC108D V8t	**G**	(Canada) Paul Tracy	3	2	19*	7	1*	1	1	6	Wth	7	7	10	4	27	28	28	26	26	**121**	**5th**
