= Della Penna Motorsports =

Car racing team

(United States) Della Penna Motorsports
- Founded: 1990
- Folded: 2000
- Base: Indianapolis, Indiana, USA
- Team principal(s): (Argentina) John Della Penna
- Former series: IndyCar Series; CART; Toyota Atlantic
- Drivers' Championships: 1995 Atlantic (Hearn)

Career
- Debut: Toyota Atlantic: 1990 Sonoma (Sonoma Raceway); Indy Racing League: 1996 Walt Disney World (Walt Disney World Speedway); CART: 1996 Grand Prix of Long Beach (Streets of Long Beach)
- Latest race: Toyota Atlantic: 1995 Laguna Seca (Laguna Seca); Indy Racing League: 1996 Las Vegas (Las Vegas Motor Speedway); CART: 2000 Fontana (Auto Club Speedway)
- Race victories: Toyota Atlantic: 14; Indy Racing League: 1 CART: 0
- Pole positions: Toyota Atlantic: 19; Indy Racing League: 1 CART: 0

Della Penna Motorsports was an auto racing team that competed in the Toyota Atlantic, IndyCar, and CART series from 1990 to 2000. The team was founded by Argentinian businessman and engineer John Della Penna, who himself raced in Formula Atlantic during the 1980s. Della Penna got its start in Toyota Atlantic with support from driver Jimmy Vasser in 1990, and by the following season was consistently scoring wins. After Vasser left to drive in CART, Della Penna took a two-year sabbatical from the series, with the hopes of returning with young, untested talent.

In 1994 Della Penna signed Richie Hearn to drive in Toyota Atlantic with the hopes of moving up to CART by 1997. Hearn finished second in points that season and won the championship the following season. Della Penna joined the upstart Indy Racing League in 1996 with the goal of transitioning into CART the following year. In five races between 1996 and 1997, Hearn placed 3rd at the Indianapolis 500, scored a pole position at New Hampshire, and won at Las Vegas. That same year Della Penna ran three races during the 1996 CART season using the same equipment as during the 1996 IRL season.

Della Penna went full-time beginning in 1997, but found itself struggling for points and would never finish higher than 5th, despite major sponsorship deals with Ralphs/Food 4 Less, Budweiser, and Fujifilm. The team formed a close relationship with Toyota in 1999 to test its new racing engine program, but still the team's fortunes did not improve. Finally, in 2000, Hearn left CART to pursue a drive in the IRL and was replaced by ex-Formula One driver Norberto Fontana. Fontana failed to impress early on and was replaced mid-season by Memo Gidley for the rest of the season.

After the 2000 season it was announced that Toyota had ended its partnership with Della Penna, leaving the team without an engine for the 2001 season. Rather than sign with another manufacturer, the team officially folded before the beginning of the season. The team and its assets were sold to Blair Racing while John Della Penna went on to mentor Argentinian driver Pablo Pérez Companc through an open-wheel and sports car career.

== Racing results ==
=== Complete SCCA Toyota Atlantic Championship results ===
(key)

Year	Chassis	Engine	Drivers	No.	1	2	3	4	5	6	7	8	9	10	11	12	13	14	15	Pts Pos	Pos
1990 West					LBH	SON	CGY^{1}		LAG1	WST	VAN	ROA	LAG2								
1990 West	Swift DB-4	Toyota 4A-GE	(United States) Jimmy Vasser	36		16			18			1	17	16						21st	20
1991					LBH	PHX	LIM	MON	WGL	DES	TOR	CGY^{1}		TRI	VAN	MDO	NAZ	LAG			
1991	Swift DB-4	Toyota 4A-GE	(United States) Jamie Galles	35	11	3	14	6	17	8	22			20	2	10	13	5	16	9th	76
1991	Swift DB-4	Toyota 4A-GE	(United States) Jimmy Vasser	36	1	21	22	1	1	1	23			21	7	1	2	27	1	2nd	153
1994					PHX	LBH	MOS	MIL	MON	TOR	TRI	MDO	VAN	NAZ	LAG						
1994	Ralt RT-40/41	Toyota 4A-GE	(United States) Clint Mears	4				6		12		6			5					11th	35
1994	Ralt RT-40/41	Toyota 4A-GE	(United States) Richie Hearn	19	10	1	7	3	1	1	4	2	3	14	1					2nd	160
1995					MIA	PHX	LBH	NAZ	MIL	MON	TOR	TRI		MDO	VAN	LAG					
1995	Ralt RT-40/41	Toyota 4A-GE	(United States) Clint Mears	3	10	19	6	12	7	19	5	7	19	9	6	25				9th	66
1995	Ralt RT-40/41	Toyota 4A-GE	(United States) Richie Hearn	4	3	2	5	2	5	2	1	2	1	1	2	2				1st	201

1. Non-championship event.

=== Complete Indy Racing League results ===
(key)

Year	Chassis	Engine	Tyres	Drivers	No.	1	2	3	4	5	6	7	8	9	10	Pts Pos	Pos
1996						WDW	PHX	INDY									
1996	Reynard 95i	Ford XB V8t	G	(United States) Richie Hearn	4	19	4	3								4th	237
1996	Reynard 95i	Ford XB V8t	G	(United States) Scott Harrington	44			15								31st	20
1996–1997						NHA	LSV	WDW	PHX	INDY	TXS	PPIR	CLT	NHA2	LSV2		
1996–1997	Reynard 95i	Ford XB V8t	G	(United States) Richie Hearn	4	14	1*									33rd	59

=== Complete PPG CART Indycar World Series/CART FedEx Championship Series results ===
(key)

Year	Chassis	Engine	Tyres	Drivers	No.	1	2	3	4	5	6	7	8	9	10	11	12	13	14	15	16	17	18	19	20	Pts Pos	Pos
1996						MIA	RIO	SFR	LBH	NAZ	500	MIL	DET	POR	CLE	TOR	MCH	MDO	ROA	VAN	LAG						
1996	Reynard 95i	Ford XB V8t	G	(United States) Richie Hearn (R)	44				10							25					17					29th	3
1997						MIA	SFR	LBH	NAZ	RIO	GAT	MIL	DET	POR	CLE	TOR	MCH	MDO	ROA	VAN	LAG	FON					
1997	Lola T97/00	Ford XB V8t	G	(United States) Richie Hearn	21	11	13	27	18	14	9	23	23	14	28	27	22	13	9	22	25					21st	10
1997	Swift 007.i	Ford XB V8t	G	(United States) Richie Hearn	21																	15				21st	10
1998						MIA	MOT	LBH	NAZ	RIO	GAT	MIL	DET	POR	CLE	TOR	MCH	MDO	ROA	VAN	LAG	HOU	SFR	FON			
1998	Swift 009.c	Ford XB V8t	F	(United States) Richie Hearn	10	13	27	23	10	7	28	6	23	10	18	7	5	24	13	16	11	9	18	8		16th	47
1998	Swift 007.i	Ford XB V8t	F	(Japan) Hideshi Matsuda	43		18																			34th	0
1999						MIA	MOT	LBH	NAZ	RIO	GAT	MIL	POR	CLE	ROA	TOR	MCH	DET	MDO	CHI	VAN	LAG	HOU	SRF	FON		
1999	Swift 010.c	Toyota RV8D/E V8t	F	(United States) Richie Hearn	10	23	10	11	20	19																22nd	26
1999	Reynard 98i/99i	Toyota RV8D/E V8t	F	(United States) Richie Hearn	10						13	21	22	10	10	16	12	13	12	16	6	16	8	23	27	22nd	26
2000						MIA	LBH	RIO	MOT	NAZ	MIL	DET	POR	CLE	TOR	MCH	CHI	MDO	ROA	VAN	LAG	GAT	HOU	SRF	FON		
2000	Reynard 2Ki	Toyota RV8E V8t	F	(Argentina) Norberto Fontana (R)	10	15	15	23	Wth	20	Wth	14	21	11	20											28th	2
2000	Reynard 2Ki	Toyota RV8E V8t	F	(United States) Memo Gidley	10											10	10	12	6	16	19	22	21		21	20th	20
2000	Reynard 2Ki	Toyota RV8E V8t	F	(Australia) Jason Bright (R)	10																			18		31st	0
