= Walker Racing =

American auto racing team

(United Kingdom) Walker Racing
- Founded: 1991
- Founder(s): Derrick Walker
- Folded: 2016
- Former series: CART; Champ Car World Series; IndyCar Series; American Le Mans Series; United SportsCar Championship
- Noted drivers: (Brazil) Gil de Ferran (Brazil) Christian Fittipaldi (United States) A. J. Foyt (Canada) Scott Goodyear (Japan) Naoki Hattori (United States) Bryan Herta (United States) Buddy Lazier (Japan) Shinji Nakano (France) Simon Pagenaud (Australia) Will Power (Canada) Alex Tagliani (Japan) Tora Takagi (United States) Sarah Fisher

Walker Racing was a racing team founded by Derrick Walker in 1991 racing originally in the CART Championship Car series. It last competed in the United SportsCar Championship under the name of Team Falken Tire until Falken Tire pulled out of not only the series but the team in general at the conclusion of the 2015 United SportsCar Championship season.

== Early success ==
The team was founded by Walker, who purchased the left over assets of the former Porsche Indy team. In the first season, 1991, the team successfully qualified rookie Willy T. Ribbs at the Indy 500.

In 1992, the team fielded Scott Goodyear on a full-time basis who won at Michigan and nearly won the 1992 Indianapolis 500. He was joined beginning with the 1993 Indianapolis 500 by Willy T. Ribbs who raced with the team until the end of the 1994 season. The team ran a third full-time car in 1993 for Hiro Matsushita.

Goodyear was replaced at the beginning of the 1994 season by Robby Gordon who raced with the team with Valvoline sponsorship until 1996. Gordon raced alongside teammate Mark Smith who was a championship contender in Indy Lights and showed promise in his 1993 CART rookie season but had a difficult 1994 season with the Walker Racing team. Smith was replaced by rookie Christian Fittipaldi in 1995 who finished second in the Indy 500 and finished 15th in points.

As a results of the CART–IRL split in 1996, the Walker team elected to participate in both races with Gordon and Fredrik Ekblom driving in the U.S. 500 and Mike Groff racing in the 1996 Indianapolis 500.

In 1997, Gil de Ferran took over the Valvoline car and was the runner up in the championship that year, despite not scoring a victory. De Ferran stayed with the team until 1999, a year where he finally broke through and scored his first victory for the team, the team's first since Gordon's win at Detroit in 1995.

== Downturn ==
With no driver or sponsorship for the 2000 season, the team was forced to take on pay driver Shinji Nakano who finished a disappointing 24th in points. Meanwhile, the team entered the Indy Racing League's IndyCar Series in 2000 with rookie female driver Sarah Fisher who was inconsistent but fast in her two years with the team, scoring a career-best finish of 2nd place at Homestead-Miami Speedway in 2001. Nakano was replaced in the team's CART entry in 2001 by countryman Tora Takagi who brought Pioneer Electronics sponsorship to the team. Takagi managed slightly improved results over Nakano scoring 10 top-10 finishes in his two seasons with the team. The team also attempted to field Oriol Servia in the 2002 Indianapolis 500 but he failed to qualify.

Takagi left to the IRL in 2003 and the void was filled by Mexican driver Rodolfo Lavin who brought Corona sponsorship. Walker ran Darren Manning full-time in a second car with a variety of different sponsors and he finished 9th in points while Lavin only managed 18th.

Both drivers were gone for 2004 as the series morphed into the Champ Car World Series. Brazilian Mario Haberfeld drove the team's only full-time car. Late in that season Australian businessman Craig Gore bought into the team and it became Team Australia.

== Team Australia ==
In 2005 the team took an Australian turn due to its new sponsorship, with the addition of Aussie Vineyards sponsorship and Australian rookie driver Marcus Marshall joining Canadian veteran Alex Tagliani as the team returned to two full-time cars. Will Power made his debut in a third car at the 2005 Lexmark Indy 300 in Australia and replaced Marshall for the season finale in Mexico. The pair of Tagliani and Power continued with the team in 2006 and Tagliani was replaced by 2006 Champ Car Atlantic Series champion Simon Pagenaud in 2007. Power won two races in 2007 including the season opener in Las Vegas, the team's first victory since Gil De Ferran was with the team.

Walker initially indicated that he believed that the Champ Car World Series had run its last race and he was preparing to race in the IRL IndyCar Series in 2008. However, on March 9 the team announced that it would not race in the IndyCar Series in 2008 as it was unable to find adequate funding to do so as sponsor Aussie Vineyards jumped ship to KV Racing. Walker Racing did finally appear in the 2008 season in a joint effort with Vision Racing at Edmonton to run Paul Tracy.

Walker fielded Stefan Wilson for a partial season campaign in Indy Lights in 2009.

== American Le Mans Series ==
In 2011, Derrick Walker joined forces with Team Falken Tire to run a Porsche 997 GT3-RSR in the upcoming American Le Mans Series season in the GT class. Falken's motorsports division made their ALMS début in 2009 racing certain events before entering a full 2010 season. The team took its maiden victory at the 2011 Mid-Ohio Sports Car Challenge in which heavy rain towards the end of the race which favoured the team as the rain tires Falken developed were considerably better than those of Michelin and Dunlop. Wolf Henzler, one of the drivers in the race was in seventh when the rain started falling and went up to fifth before the safety car came out. In the restart, Henzler overtook the next four cars in a single lap to take the lead before the red flags came out around ten minutes before the end of the race. It was also the first win for a team running on Falken Tires and also the first wins for drivers Wolf Henzler and Bryan Sellers. The team also took class wins at the 2011 Baltimore Grand Prix, at the 2012 Baltimore Sports Car Challenge, and at the 2013 Petit Le Mans.

== Ed Carpenter Racing ==
In 2012, Derrick Walker returned to the IndyCar Series as team manager for Ed Carpenter Racing, co-owned by Tony George and driver Ed Carpenter. The team is based in the Walker Racing facility and utilizes Walker Racing's equipment and personnel.

== Closure ==
On November 20, 2016, the team was put up for auction after a year of searching for a replacement sponsor for its IMSA team. On December 6, 2016, after the auction is complete the team will be officially listed as defunct.

== Drivers ==
=== CART/CCWS ===
- (Switzerland) Jon Beekhuis (1992)
- (Australia) David Besnard (2004)
- (Brazil) Gil de Ferran (1997-1999)
- (Mexico) Luis Diaz (2003)
- (Sweden) Fredrik Ekblom (1996)
- (Brazil) Christian Fittipaldi (1995)
- (United States) A. J. Foyt (1992)
- (United States) Memo Gidley (1999)
- (Canada) Scott Goodyear (1991-1993, 1996)
- (United States) Robby Gordon (1994-1996)
- (United States) Mike Groff (1992, 1996)
- (Brazil) Mario Haberfeld (2004)
- (Japan) Naoki Hattori (1999)
- (United States) Bryan Herta (2000)
- (Mexico) Rodolfo Lavín (2003)
- (United States) Buddy Lazier (1991)
- (United Kingdom) Darren Manning (2003)
- (Australia) Marcus Marshall (2005)
- (Japan) Hiro Matsushita (1993)
- (Japan) Shinji Nakano (2000)
- (France) Simon Pagenaud (2007)
- (Australia) Will Power (2005-2007)
- (United States) Willy T. Ribbs (1991-1994)
- (United States) Mark Smith (1994)
- (Canada) Alex Tagliani (2005-2006, 2008)
- (Japan) Tora Takagi (2001-2002)
- (Canada) Michael Valiante (2004)
- (Netherlands) Charles Zwolsman (2005)

=== IRL IndyCar Series ===
- (Canada) Paul Tracy (2008)
- (United States) Sarah Fisher (2000-2001)
- (United States) Mike Groff (1996)

== Racing results ==
=== Complete CART FedEx Championship Series results ===
(key) (results in bold indicate pole position) (results in italics indicate fastest lap)

Year	Chassis	Engine	Tyres	Drivers	No.	1	2	3	4	5	6	7	8	9	10	11	12	13	14	15	16	17	18	19	20	21	Pts Pos	Pos
1991						SFR	LBH	PHX	INDY	MIL	DET	POR	CLE	MEA	TOR	MCH	DEN	VAN	MDO	ROA	NAZ	LAG						
1991	Lola T90/00	Cosworth DFS V8 t	G	(Canada) Scott Goodyear	15	23	7	21	27	9	8	10	19	8	7	15	24	8	11	9	21	11					13th	**42**
1991	Lola T90/00	Cosworth DFS V8 t	G	(United States) Willy T. Ribbs	10						11		22	10			6	21		10	17	12					17th	**17**
1991	Lola T90/00	Buick 3300 V6 t	G	(United States) Willy T. Ribbs	17				32																		17th	**17**
1992						SFR	PHX	LBH	INDY	DET	POR	MIL	NHA	TOR	MCH	CLE	ROA	VAN	MDO	NAZ	LAG							
1992	Lola T91/00; Lola T92/00	Chevrolet 265A V8 t	G	(Canada) Scott Goodyear	15	9	18	5	2	22	8	8	3	6	1*	10	20	5	16	4	26						5th	**108**
1992	Lola T90/00	Cosworth DFS V8 t	G	(United States) A. J. Foyt	17	23																					26th	**4**
1992	Lola T90/00	Cosworth DFS V8 t	G	(Finland) Tero Palmroth	17		DNQ																				58th	**0**
1992	Lola T91/00	Chevrolet 265A V8 t	G	(United States) Johnny Rutherford	17				DNQ																		NC	—
1992	Lola T91/00	Chevrolet 265A V8 t	G	(United States) Mike Groff	17				DNQ	DNS							24										25th	**5**
1992	Lola T91/00	Chevrolet 265A V8 t	G	(Switzerland) Jon Beekhuis	17										21												48th	**0**
1992	Lola T91/00	Chevrolet 265A V8 t	G	(United States) Dennis Vitolo	17														DNS								42nd	**0**
1992	Lola T91/00	Chevrolet 265A V8 t	G	(United States) Willy T. Ribbs	17																25						57th	**0**
1993						SFR	PHX	LBH	INDY	MIL	DET	POR	CLE	TOR	MCH	NHA	ROA	VAN	MDO	NAZ	LAG							
1993	Lola T93/00	Ford XB V8 t	G	(Canada) Scott Goodyear	2	10	**20**	16	7	23	10	12	20	9	5	19	10	**4**	3	2	4						9th	**86**
1993	Lola T93/00	Ford XB V8 t	G	(Japan) Hiro Matsushita	15	11	10	14	18	13	13	21	12	16	14	13	13	12	13	21	19						26th	**7**
1993	Lola T92/00	Ford XB V8 t	G	(United States) Willy T. Ribbs	75				21	11	12	16	27	18	10	15	12	16	11	19	28						20th	**9**
1994						SFR	PHX	LBH	INDY	MIL	DET	POR	CLE	TOR	MCH	MDO	NHA	VAN	ROA	NAZ	LAG							
1994	Lola T94/00	Ford XB V8 t	G	(United States) Robby Gordon	9	23	7	3	5	6	3	4	11	**6**	13	4	13	**2**	25	23	13						5th	**104**
1994	Lola T94/00	Ford XB V8 t	G	(United States) Mark Smith	15	21	Wth	25	DNQ	24	14	16	22	30	5	20	12	8	26	12	14						19th	**17**
1994	Lola T93/00	Ford XB V8 t	G	(United States) Willy T. Ribbs	24	18	28	18	DNQ																		22nd	**12**
1994	Lola T94/00	Ford XB V8 t	G	(United States) Willy T. Ribbs	24				DNQ	25	16	25	12	21	7	28	10	25	24	18	11						22nd	**12**
1995						MIA	SFR	PHX	LBH	NAZ	INDY	MIL	DET	POR	ROA	TOR	CLE	MCH	MDO	NHA	VAN	LAG						
1995	Reynard 95i	Ford XB V8 t	G	(United States) Robby Gordon	5	13	14	1	22	**4**	5	5	**1***	8	26	5	6	DNS	8	9	3	15					5th	**121**
1995	Reynard 95i	Ford XB V8 t	G	(Brazil) Christian Fittipaldi **(R)**	15	5	25	10	14	20	2	7	17	12	8	9	24	9	25	8	24	24					15th	**54**
1996						MIA	RIO	SFR	LBH	NAZ	500	MIL	DET	POR	CLE	TOR	MCH	MDO	ROA	VAN	LAG							
1996	Reynard 96i	Ford XD V8 t	G	(United States) Robby Gordon	5	3	15	16	13	22	20	17	26	10	18	9	8	18	17	10	15						18th	**29**
1996	Reynard 96i	Ford XB V8 t	G	(Canada) Scott Goodyear	15	12	DNS									19				9	18						25th	**5**
1996	Reynard 96i	Ford XB V8 t	G	(United States) Mike Groff	15					14																	34th	**0**
1996	Reynard 96i	Ford XB V8 t	G	(Sweden) Fredrik Ekblom	15						25																40th	**0**
1997						MIA	SFR	LBH	NAZ	RIO	GAT	MIL	DET	POR	CLE	TOR	MCH	MDO	ROA	VAN	LAG	FON						
1997	Reynard 97i	Honda HRR V8 t	G	(Brazil) Gil de Ferran	5	22	5	**21**	4	11	3	7	**3***	2	2*	25	3	6	3	3	5	6					**2nd**	**162**
1998						MIA	MOT	LBH	NAZ	RIO	GAT	MIL	DET	POR	CLE	TOR	MCH	MDO	ROA	VAN	LAG	HOU	SFR	FON				
1998	Reynard 98i	Honda HRK V8 t	G	(Brazil) Gil de Ferran	5	7	3	20*	4	26	6	22	3	20	6	27	16	9	16	13	19	21	14	17			12th	**67**
1999						MIA	MOT	LBH	NAZ	RIO	GAT	MIL	POR	CLE	ROA	TOR	MCH	DET	MDO	CHI	VAN	LAG	HOU	SRF	FON			
1999	Reynard 99i	Honda HRS V8 t	G	(Brazil) Gil de Ferran	5	6	**2**	6	15	10	25	3	1*	2	14	**19**	24	22	6	13	26	6	17	27	9		8th	**108**
1999	Reynard 99i	Honda HRS V8 t	G	(Japan) Naoki Hattori **(R)**	15	25												16	19		27	14	22	20	19		35th	**0**
1999	Reynard 99i	Honda HRS V8 t	G	(United States) Memo Gidley	15								19	11	26	12											29th	**4**
2000						MIA	LBH	RIO	MOT	NAZ	MIL	DET	POR	CLE	TOR	MCH	CHI	MDO	ROA	VAN	LAG	GAT	HOU	SRF	FON			
2000	Reynard 2Ki	Honda HR-0 V8 t	F	(Japan) Shinji Nakano **(R)**	5	8			14		23	15	11	15	14	20	13	19	22	19	26	21	8	21	16		24th	**12**
2000	Reynard 2Ki	Honda HR-0 V8 t	F	(United States) Bryan Herta	5		5	20																			18th	**26**
2001						MTY	LBH	TEX	NAZ	MOT	MIL	DET	POR	CLE	TOR	MCH	CHI	MDO	ROA	VAN	LAU	ROC	HOU	LAG	SRF	FON		
2001	Reynard 01i	Toyota RV8F V8 t	F	(Japan) Toranosuke Takagi **(R)**	5	10	20	C^{1}	14	20	20	20	18	14	22	13	11	21	22	7	6	26	4	13	16	15	21st	**12**
2002						MTY	LBH	MOT	MIL	LAG	POR	CHI	TOR	CLE	VAN	MDO	ROA	MTL	DEN	ROC	MIA	SFR	FON	MXC				
2002	Reynard 02i	Toyota RV8F V8 t	B	(Japan) Toranosuke Takagi	5	14	6	8	14	16	18	4	8	7	15	12	15	14	15	6	15	DNS	18	6			15th	**53**
2003						STP	MTY	LBH	BRH	LAU	MIL	LAG	POR	CLE	TOR	VAN	ROA	MDO	MTL	DEN	MIA	MXC	SFR					
2003	Reynard 02i	Ford XFE V8 t	B	(Mexico) Rodolfo Lavín **(R)**	5	18	15	18	15	9	14	19	11	14	15	8	19	12	15	19	18	18	8				18th	**17**
2003	Reynard 02i	Ford XFE V8 t	B	(United Kingdom) Darren Manning **(R)**	15	13	7	8	10	6	4	18	6	10	8	5	6	8	10	8	11	9	2				9th	**103**
2003	Reynard 02i	Ford XFE V8 t	B	(Mexico) Luis Díaz **(R)**	25																	19					27th	**0**
2004						LBH	MTY	MIL	POR	CLE	TOR	VAN	ROA	DEN	MTL	LAG	LSV	SFR	MXC									
2004	Reynard 02i	Ford XFE V8 t	B	(Brazil) Mario Haberfeld	5	9	15	10	9	14	4	9	11	8	13	7	14	14	15								13th	**157**
2004	Reynard 02i	Ford XFE V8 t	B	(Australia) David Besnard **(R)**	15													7									20th	**18**
2004	Reynard 02i	Ford XFE V8 t	B	(Canada) Michael Valiante **(R)**	15														14								23rd	**7**

1. The Firestone Firehawk 600 was canceled after qualifying due to excessive g-forces on the drivers.

=== Complete IRL IndyCar Series results ===
(key)

Year	Chassis	Engine	Tyres	Drivers	No.	1	2	3	4	5	6	7	8	9	10	11	12	13	14	15	16	17	18	19	Pts Pos	Pos
1996						WDW	PHX	INDY																		
1996	Reynard 95i	Ford XB V8 t	G	(United States) Mike Groff	60			20																	6th	228
1997						NHA	LSV	WDW	PHX	INDY	TXS	PPIR	CLT	NHA2	LSV2											
1997	Reynard 95i	Ford XB V8 t	G	(United States) Robby Gordon	50		14																		37th	27
2000						WDW	PHX	LSV	INDY	TXS	PPIR	ATL	KTY	TXS												
2000	Riley & Scott Mk V	Oldsmobile Aurora V8	F	(United States) Sarah Fisher **(R)**	15		13	17																	18th	124
2000	Dallara IR-00	Oldsmobile Aurora V8	F	(United States) Sarah Fisher **(R)**	15				31	12	25	14	3	11											18th	124
2001						PHX	HMS	ATL	INDY	TXS	PPIR	RIR	KAN	NSH	KTY	GAT	CHI	TXS								
2001	Dallara IR-01	Oldsmobile Aurora V8	F	(United States) Sarah Fisher	15	17	2	11	31	18	10	17	12	19	19	11	24	25							19th	188
2008						HMS	STP	MOT	LBH^{1}	KAN	INDY	MIL	TXS	IOW	RIR	WGL	NSH	MDO	EDM	KTY	SNM	DET	CHI	SRF^{2}		
2008	Panoz DP01	Cosworth XFE V8 t	B	(Canada) Alex Tagliani	15				7																32nd	56
2008	Dallara IR-05	Honda HI7R V8	F	(Canada) Paul Tracy	22														4^{3}						33rd	51

1. Run to Champ Car specifications.
2. Non-points-paying, exhibition race.
3. Run in conjunction with Vision Racing.
