= 1997 Sunbelt IndyCarnival =

Coordinates: 27°59′17.9″S 153°25′42.1″E

(Australia) 1997 Surfers Paradise
Race details
- Race 2 of 17 in the 1997 CART season
- Map of the track
- Date: 6 April, 1997
- Official name: Sunbelt IndyCarnival
- Location: Surfers Paradise Street Circuit; Queensland, Australia
- Course: Temporary Street Circuit; 2.795 mi / 4.498 km
- Distance: 57 laps 159.315 mi / 256.386 km

Pole position
- Driver: (Italy) Alex Zanardi (Target Chip Ganassi)
- Time: 1:35.940

Fastest lap
- Driver: (Italy) Alex Zanardi (Target Chip Ganassi)
- Time: 1:38.026 (on lap 37 of 57)

Podium
- First: (United States) Scott Pruett (Patrick Racing)
- Second: (Canada) Greg Moore (Forsythe Racing)
- Third: (United States) Michael Andretti (Newman-Haas Racing)

The 1997 Sunbelt IndyCarnival was the second round of the 1997 CART World Series Season, held on 6 April 1997 on the Surfers Paradise Street Circuit, Surfers Paradise, Queensland, Australia. Scott Pruett won his 2nd and final victory of his career as a driver in CART.

== Qualifying results ==
Pos	Nat	Name	Team	Chassis	Time
1	(Italy)	Alex Zanardi	Chip Ganassi Racing	Reynard 97I Honda	1:35.940
2	(Canada)	Paul Tracy	Team Penske	Penske PC-26-97 Mercedes-Benz	1:36.140
3	(United States)	Jimmy Vasser	Chip Ganassi Racing	Reynard 97I Honda	1:36.441
4	(Canada)	Greg Moore	Forsythe Racing	Reynard 96I Mercedes-Benz	1:36.754
5	(United Kingdom)	Mark Blundell	PacWest	Reynard 97I Mercedes-Benz	1:36.754
6	(United States)	Parker Johnstone	Team Green	Reynard 97I Honda	1:36.772
7	(United States)	Scott Pruett	Patrick Racing	Reynard 97I Ford XD Cosworth	1:36.831
8	(Brazil)	Maurício Gugelmin	PacWest	Reynard 97I Mercedes-Benz	1:36.896
9	(Brazil)	Christian Fittipaldi	Newman-Haas Racing	Swift 007.i Ford XD Cosworth	1:36.945
10	(United States)	Bobby Rahal	Team Rahal	Reynard 97I Ford XD Cosworth	1:37.078
11	(Brazil)	Gil de Ferran	Walker Racing	Reynard 97I Honda	1:37.324
12	(United States)	Michael Andretti	Newman-Haas Racing	Swift 007.i Ford XD Cosworth	1:37.371
13	(United Kingdom)	Dario Franchitti	Hogan Racing	Reynard 97I Mercedes-Benz	1:37.592
14	(Brazil)	André Ribeiro	Tasman Motorsports	Lola T97/00 Honda	1:37.646
15	(Mexico)	Adrián Fernández	Tasman Motorsports	Lola T97/00 Honda	1:37.819
16	(United States)	Bryan Herta	Team Rahal	Reynard 97I Ford XB Cosworth	1:37.895
17	(United States)	Al Unser Jr.	Team Penske	Penske PC-26-97 Mercedes-Benz	1:38.218
18	(Brazil)	Gualter Salles	Davis Racing	Reynard 97I Ford XD Cosworth	1:38.325
19	(Brazil)	Raul Boesel	Patrick Racing	Reynard 97I Ford XD Cosworth	1:38.521
20	(United States)	Richie Hearn	Della Penna Motorsports	Lola T97/00 Ford XD Cosworth	1:38.990
21	(Canada)	Patrick Carpentier	Bettenhausen Racing	Reynard 97I Mercedes-Benz	1:39.595
22	(Italy)	Max Papis	Arciero-Wells Racing	Reynard 97I Toyota	1:39.927
23	(Argentina)	Juan Manuel Fangio II	All American Racing	Reynard 96I Toyota	1:39.981
24	(United States)	Paul Jasper	Payton/Coyne Racing	Lola T97/00 Ford XD Cosworth	1:40.138
25	(United States)	P. J. Jones	All American Racing	Reynard 96I Toyota	1:40.505
26	(Mexico)	Michel Jourdain Jr.	Payton/Coyne Racing	Lola T97/00 Ford XD Cosworth	1:41.871
27	(Germany)	Arnd Meier	Project Indy	Lola T97/00 Ford XD Cosworth	1:42.316
28	(Japan)	Hiro Matsushita	Arciero-Wells Racing	Reynard 97I Toyota	1:42.795

== Race ==
Pos	No	Driver	Team	Laps	Time/retired	Grid	Points
1	20	(United States) Scott Pruett	Patrick Racing	57	2:01:04.678	7	20
2	99	(Canada) Greg Moore	Forsythe Racing	57	+0.7 secs	4	16
3	6	(United States) Michael Andretti	Newman-Haas Racing	57	+11.3 secs	12	14
4	4	(Italy) Alex Zanardi	Chip Ganassi Racing	57	+14.8 secs	1	13
5	5	(Brazil) Gil de Ferran	Walker Racing	57	+15.6 secs	11	10
6	31	(Brazil) André Ribeiro	Tasman Motorsports	57	+16.8 secs	14	8
7	40	(Brazil) Raul Boesel	Patrick Racing	57	+17.6 secs	19	6
8	18	(United Kingdom) Mark Blundell	PacWest Racing	57	+18.2 secs	5	5
9	9	(United Kingdom) Dario Franchitti	Hogan Racing	57	+23.6 secs	13	4
10	7	(United States) Bobby Rahal	Team Rahal	57	+25.9 secs	11	3
11	32	(Mexico) Adrián Fernández	Tasman Motorsports	57	+29.7 secs	15	2
12	1	(United States) Jimmy Vasser	Chip Ganassi Racing	57	+30.2 secs	3	1
13	10	(United States) Richie Hearn	Della Penna Motorsports	57	+38.2 secs	20	
14	25	(Italy) Max Papis	Arciero-Wells Racing	57	+39.5 secs	22	
15	16	(Canada) Patrick Carpentier	Bettenhausen Racing	57	+41.8 secs	21	
16	64	(Germany) Arnd Meier	Project Indy	57	+58.1 secs	27	
17	17	(Brazil) Maurício Gugelmin	PacWest	57	+1:14.1 secs	8	
18	19	(Mexico) Michel Jourdain Jr.	Payton/Coyne Racing	43	Transmission	26	
19	3	(Canada) Paul Tracy	Team Penske	41	Contact	2	1
20	36	(Argentina) Juan Manuel Fangio II	All American Racing	37	Fire	23	
21	27	(United States) Parker Johnstone	Team Green	35	Broken wheel	6	
22	8	(United States) Bryan Herta	Team Rahal	29	Contact	16	
23	34	(United States) Paul Jasper	Payton/Coyne Racing	24	Broken transmission	24	
24	77	(Brazil) Gualter Salles	Davis Racing	17	Contact	18	
25	24	(Japan) Hiro Matsushita	Arciero-Wells Racing	16	Electrical	28	
26	98	(United States) P. J. Jones	All American Racing	15	Fire	25	
27	2	(United States) Al Unser Jr.	Team Penske	10	Lost wheel	17	
DNS	11	(Brazil) Christian Fittipaldi	Newman-Haas Racing			9	

Christian Fittipaldi started the race but broke his leg in a massive crash on Lap 2. Because the race was restarted, the first start was considered void and thus Fittipaldi was not classified starting the race.

=== Racing Statistics ===
- Average Speed 85.328 mph

=== Race statistics ===
Lap Leaders
Laps	Leader
1–18	Alex Zanardi
19-39	Paul Tracy
40-41	Arnd Meier
42-57	Scott Pruett

Cautions: 7 for 30 laps
Laps	Reason
Pace Laps	Gil de Ferran, Christian Fittipaldi, Michel Jourdain Jr. crash turn 1
6-9	Gualter Salles spun
9-13	Michel Jourdain Jr., Richie Hearn accident
19-23	Gualter Salles accident
30-33	Bryan Herta, Mark Blundell, Parker Johnstone accident
38-41	Juan Manuel Fangio II engine
41-44	Paul Tracy, Alex Zanardi accident
49-52	Mauricio Gugelmin spun

Previous race: 1997 Marlboro Grand Prix of Miami	CART PPG World Series; 1997 season	Next race: 1997 Toyota Grand Prix of Long Beach
Previous race: 1996 Bartercard Indycar Australia	1997 Sunbelt IndyCarnival	Next race: 1998 Honda Indy 300
