= Dennis Vitolo =

American racing driver

- Born: December 18, 1956 (age 69) Massapequa, New York, U.S.
- Retired: 1999

CART World Series
- Years active: 1988–1989, 1991–1999
- Teams: Bettenhausen Racing; Dale Coyne Racing; Walker Racing; Dick Simon Racing; Pagan Racing; Project Indy; Payton/Coyne Racing
- Starts: 36
- Wins: 0
- Poles: 0
- Best finish: 25th in 1997

Previous series
- 1997: Indy Racing League

Dennis Vitolo (born December 18, 1956) is an American former race driver who competed in the CART series. He raced in the 1988 and 1991–1999 seasons with 36 career starts, including the 1994 Indianapolis 500. He was involved in a crash in that race, taking out reigning CART champion Nigel Mansell in an incident that occurred under caution. The field had slowed and Vitolo ran into the rear of John Andretti's car, launched into the air, and landed on Mansell's car on the warm-up lane between turns 1 and 2. Vitolo also raced in the 1997 Indianapolis 500, which by then had become part of the Indy Racing League. His best career CART finish was seventh, in the U.S. 500 at Michigan International Speedway.

Vitolo also mentored NASCAR driver Mike Senica as the two met back in 1994 after the Indianapolis 500.

== Racing record ==
=== American Open Wheel racing results ===
(key)

==== CART ====
Year	Team	No.	1	2	3	4	5	6	7	8	9	10	11	12	13	14	15	16	17	18	19	20	Rank	Points	Ref
1988	Bettenhausen Racing	16	PHX	LBH	INDY	MIL	POR	CLE	TOR	MEA	MIS	POC	MDO	ROA	NZR	LS	MIA; 11						33rd	2	
1989	Bettenhausen Racing	16	PHX	LBH	INDY	MIL	DET; DNQ	POR	CLE	MEA	TOR	MIS	POC	MDO; DNQ	ROA	NZR	LS						NC	-	
1991	Dale Coyne Racing	19	SRF; 24	LBH; 26	PHX	INDY	MIL	DET; 20	POR	CLE	MEA	TOR	MIS	DEN	VAN	MDO	ROA	NZR; 14	LS				37th	0	
1992	Dale Coyne Racing	19	SRF	PHX; 21	LBH	INDY	DET	POR	MIL	NHM; 14	TOR	MIS	CLE	ROA	VAN		NZR; 20	LS; 17					42nd	0	
1992	Walker Motorsport	15														MDO; DNS							42nd	0	
1993	Dale Coyne Racing	19	SRF	PHX	LBH	INDY	MIL	DET; DNQ	POR	CLE	TOR	MIS	NHM	ROA	VAN	MDO	NZR	LS					NC	-	
1994	Dick Simon Racing	79	SRF	PHX	LBH	INDY; 26	MIL	DET	POR	CLE	TOR	MIS	MDO	NHM	VAN	ROA	NZR	LS					53rd	0	
1995	Pagan Racing	21	MIA; 18	SRF	PHX	LBH	NZR	INDY	MIL	DET	POR	ROA	TOR	CLE	MIS	MDO	NHM	VAN	LS				41st	0	
1996	Project Indy	64	MIA	RIO	SRF	LBH; 17	NZR	500	MIL	DET	POR	CLE	TOR	MIS	MDO	ROA	VAN	LS					38th	0	
1997	Project Indy	64	MIA; 23	SRF	LBH; Wth	NZR; DNQ	RIO	GAT	MIL	DET	POR	CLE					VAN; 27	LS; 20					25th	6	
1997	Payton/Coyne Racing	34											TOR; 28	MIS; 7	MDO	ROA			FON; 16				25th	6	
1998	Payton/Coyne Racing	34	MIA; 25	MOT	LBH	NZR; 25	RIO	GAT; 25	MIL; DNQ	DET; 28	POR; 18	CLE; 24	TOR	MIS; 26	MDO	ROA	VAN; 17	LS; 26	HOU; 19	SRF; DNQ	FON; 25		33rd	0	
1999	Payton/Coyne Racing	34	MIA; 16	MOT	LBH	NZR; Wth	RIO	GAT; 24	MIL; 22	POR	CLE	ROA	TOR; 18	MIS; 11	DET	MDO	CHI; 15	VAN	LS	HOU	SRF	FON; 15	30th	2	

==== Indy Racing League ====
Year	Team	No.	Chassis	Engine	1	2	3	4	5	6	7	8	9	10	Rank	Points	Ref
1996-97	Beck Motorsports	54	Dallara IR7	Infiniti	NHM	LVS	WDW	PHX	INDY; 15	TXS	PPIR	CHR	NH2	LV2	45th	20	

==== Indianapolis 500 ====
Year	Chassis	Engine	Start	Finish	Team
1994	Lola T93/00	Ford XB	15	26	Dick Simon Racing
1997	Dallara	Infiniti	28	15	Beck Motorsports
