= Richie Hearn =

American racing driver

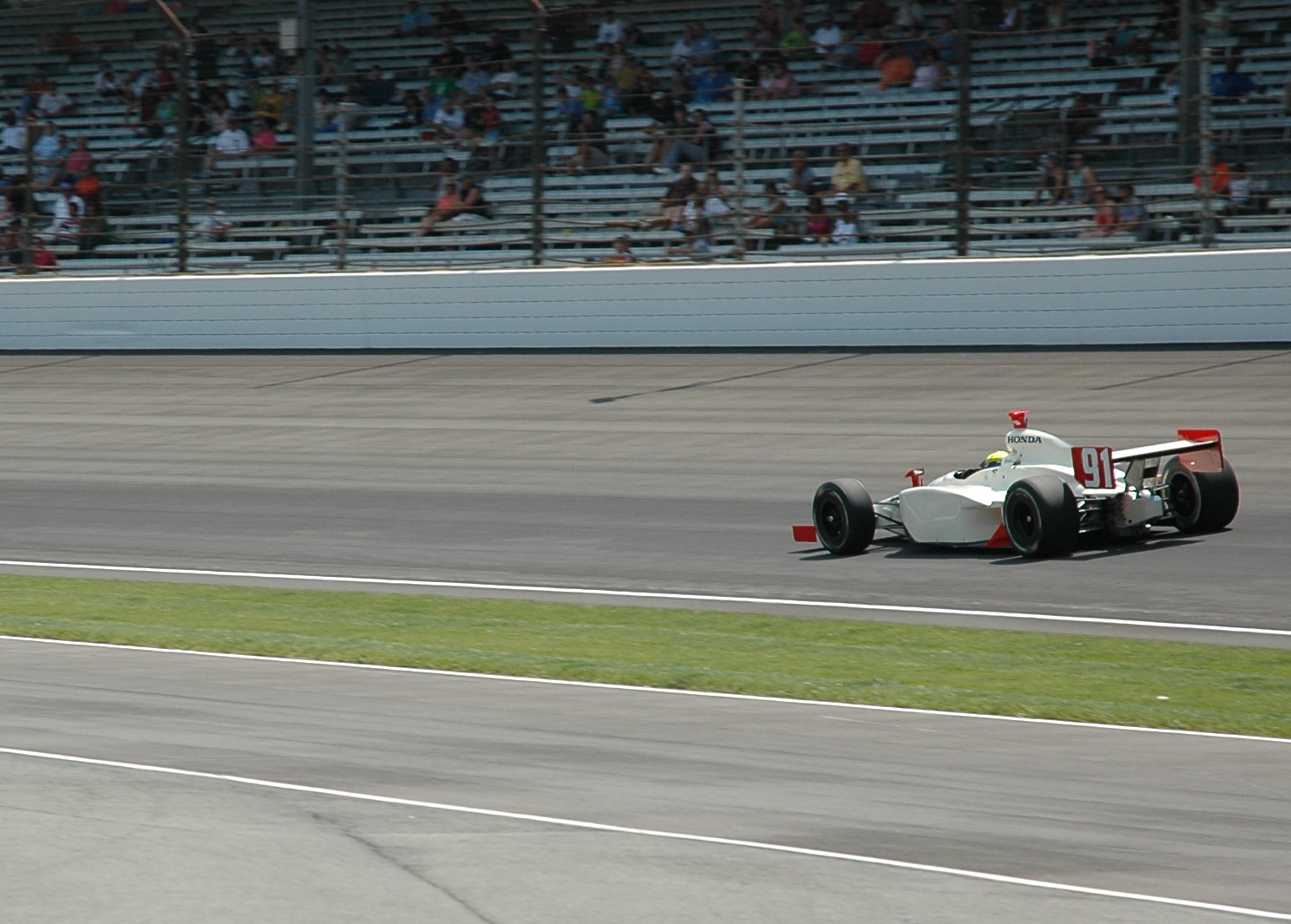
- Hearn practicing for the 2007 Indianapolis 500
- Nationality: American
- Born: Richard Edward Hearn; January 4, 1971 (age 55) Glendale, California, U.S.

Indy Racing League IndyCar Series
- Years active: 1996, 2000–2005, 2007
- Teams: Della Penna Motorsports; Pagan Racing; A. J. Foyt Enterprises; Team Menard; Hemelgarn Racing; Hemelgarn/Racing Professionals
- Starts: 25
- Wins: 1
- Poles: 2
- Best finish: 4th in 1996

CART Championship Car
- Years active: 1996–1999
- Teams: Della Penna Motorsports
- Starts: 59
- Wins: 0
- Poles: 0
- Best finish: 16th in 1998

Previous series
- 1994–1995: Toyota Atlantic

Championship titles
- 1995: Toyota Atlantic Series

Richard Edward Hearn (born January 4, 1971) is an American former racing driver.

Hearn was born in Glendale, California. He ran in the Toyota Atlantic championship for two seasons, winning the title in 1995. In 1996, he began driving for John Della Penna in both the IRL and Champ Car ranks. He won an IRL race at the Las Vegas Motor Speedway to cap off the year and was the highest finishing rookie at the Indianapolis 500, finishing 3rd.

Hearn moved full-time into Champ Car in 1997 for Della Penna with high-profile sponsor Budweiser but failed to post significant results and by 2000 was surplus for sponsored driver Norberto Fontana. He contested a few more Indy 500s, with a best result of sixth in 2002. In 2005 following the Indy 500 he retired as a driver and started Hearn Motorsports LLC that ran in the Star Mazda series. He planned to move the team into Toyota Atlantic competition in 2006. Hearn returned from retirement to qualify on Bump Day of the 2007 Indianapolis 500 in a car jointly entered by Racing Professionals and Hemelgarn Racing.

Hearn is currently a driving instructor at Spring Mountain Motorsports Ranch's Ron Fellows driving school.

== Early life ==
Hearn's parents were also racecar drivers, racing in amateur Sports Car Club of America events on the West Coast. They belonged to the Corvette club, and owned two Corvettes. His father owned a go-kart shop. When he was nine years old, he began racing go-karts. By the time he was twenty, he owned seven International Karting Federation titles.

Hearn then attended the Winfield Racing School at the Paul Ricard circuit in southern France, whose alumni included Alain Prost. His go-kart competitors helped pay for his tuition. He became the only American to qualify for Winfield's school competition. He managed to win, and was able to earn a year of sponsored racing on the Formula Renault circuit, which is several tiers below the Formula One class.

== Professional career ==
=== Toyota Atlantic ===
In 1995, Hearn won the Toyota Atlantic championship.

=== Indy Racing League IndyCar Series ===
In 1996, Hearn won a pole at New Hampshire, won a race at Las Vegas, finished third in his Indianapolis 500 debut (the best rookie finish for that race) and was fourth in series points.

=== CART Championship Car ===
In 1997, Hearn and team owner John Della Penna moved full-time to the CART FedEx Championship Series. That season, he had seventeen starts, but his best finish was ninth.

The following season, Hearn's team made upgrades and he was able to improve in his finishes. In a race in Rio de Janeiro, he finished in a career-best seventh place.

In 1999, Hearn crashed coming off turn two on lap four of the Marlboro 500, bringing out the first caution flag of the race. He was not injured, but several laps later, Greg Moore crashed in the exact same spot and was killed.

Hearn did not return for the 2000 season, as he didn't have a sponsor, and Norberto Fontana replaced him.

=== Return to Indy Racing ===
In 2002, Hearn finished sixth in the Indianapolis 500, his best finish since his rookie season. In 2003, he was hired by Menard Racing, winning the pole for that year's Indy 200.

In 2007, Hearn got a last-minute ride with Jon Herb's backup car with Hemelgarn/Racing Professionals, even though he hadn't raced since the 2005 Indy 500. With it, he qualified 32nd for the Indianapolis 500. That would be the final Indianapolis 500 he competed in. In seven seasons, he drove in 84 races.

== Later life ==
After retiring from racing, Hearn started a racing team. One of its drivers was Alexander Rossi, who would go on to win the 2016 Indy 500. However, the team became unsustainable during the Great Recession. Due to this, he became bankrupt and did odd jobs such as driving a forklift, and coached a successful flag football team. He then got a job at Bobby Flay's restaurant at Caesars Palace. However, this wasn't satisfying for him, so he became a part-time instructor at Spring Mountain Motorsports Ranch's Ron Fellows driving school, and eventually lead instructor once he quit his job at the restaurant.

Hearn still races. In 2014, he competed in the 18th SKUSA SuperNationals. From 2016 to 2017, he competed in the “Indy Legends” Charity Pro-Am. In his free time, he does iRacing, a virtual reality racing video game

=== Personal life ===
Hearn was married, but they divorced when he became bankrupt. He has a daughter.

Hearn attended college classes at Citrus College. Years later, after seeing a commercial for the Cordon Blue Culinary School, he enrolled and earned an associate degree in the culinary arts in two years.

== Motorsports Career Results ==
=== American Open-Wheel racing results ===
(key)

==== CART ====
Year	Team	Chassis	Engine	1	2	3	4	5	6	7	8	9	10	11	12	13	14	15	16	17	18	19	20	Rank	Points	Ref
1996	Della Penna Motorsports	Reynard 95i	Ford XB V8t	MIA	RIO	SRF	LBH; 10	NZR	500	MIL	DET	POR	CLE	TOR; 25	MIS	MDO	ROA	VAN	LS; 17					29th	3	
1997	Della Penna Motorsports	Lola T97/00	Ford XD V8t	MIA; 11	SRF; 13	LBH; 27	NZR; 18	RIO; 14	STL; 9	MIL; 23	DET; 23	POR; 14	CLE; 28	TOR; 27	MIS; 22	MDO; 13	ROA; 9	VAN; 22	LS; 25	FON; 15				21st	10	
1998	Della Penna Motorsports	Swift 009.c	Ford XD V8t	MIA; 13	MOT; 27	LBH; 23	NZR; 10	RIO; 7	STL; 28	MIL; 6	DET; 23	POR; 10	CLE; 18	TOR; 7	MIS; 5	MDO; 24	ROA; 13	VAN; 16	LS; 11	HOU; 9	SRF; 18	FON; 8		16th	47	
1999	Della Penna Motorsports	Swift 010.c	Toyota RV8D V8t	MIA; 23	MOT; 10	LBH; 11	NZR; 20	RIO; 19																22nd	26	
1999	Della Penna Motorsports	Reynard 99i	Toyota RV8D V8t						STL; 13	MIL; 21	POR; 22	CLE; 10	ROA; 10	TOR; 16	MIS; 12	DET; 13	MDO; 12	CHI; 16	VAN; 6	LS; 16	HOU; 8	SRF; 23	FON; 27	22nd	26	

==== IndyCar Series ====
Year	Team	Chassis	No.	Engine	1	2	3	4	5	6	7	8	9	10	11	12	13	14	15	16	17	Rank	Points	Ref
1996	Della Penna Motorsports	Reynard 95i	4	Ford XB V8t	WDW; 19	PHX; 4	INDY; 3															4th	237	
1996–1997	Della Penna Motorsports	Reynard 95i	4	Ford XB V8t	NHM; 14	LVS; 1	WDW	PHX	INDY	TXS	PPIR	CLT	NH2	LV2								33rd	59	
2000	Pagan Racing	Dallara IR-00	75	Oldsmobile Aurora V8	WDW	PHX	LVS	INDY; 27	TXS	PPIR	ATL	KTY	TX2									47th	3	
2001	Tri-Star Motorsports	Dallara IR-01	60	Oldsmobile Aurora V8	PHX	HMS	ATL	INDY; DNQ	TXS													27th	50	
2001	Sam Schmidt Motorsports	Dallara IR-01	99	Oldsmobile Aurora V8						PPIR; 9	RIR	KAN	NSH	KTY	STL	CHI; 6	TX2					27th	50	
2002	Sam Schmidt Motorsports	Dallara IR-02	99	Chevrolet Indy V8	HMS	PHX	FON; 14			TXS; 9												15th	204	
2002	Sam Schmidt Motorsports	Dallara IR-02	20	Chevrolet Indy V8					INDY; 6		PPIR; 12	RIR; 7	KAN; 10	NSH; 4	MIS; 10	KTY; 24	STL	CHI	TX2			15th	204	
2002	A. J. Foyt Enterprises	Dallara IR-02	11	Chevrolet Indy V8				NZR; 14														15th	204	
2003	Sam Schmidt Motorsports	G-Force GF09	99	Toyota Indy V8	HMS	PHX	MOT	INDY; 28	TXS	PPIR	RIR	KAN	NSH	MIS	STL	KTY	NZR					28th	39	
2003	Team Menard	Dallara IR-03	2	Chevrolet Indy V8														CHI; 14				28th	39	
2003	Hemelgarn Racing	Dallara IR-03	91	Chevrolet Indy V8															FON; 21	TX2; 18		28th	39	
2004	Sam Schmidt Motorsports	G-Force GF09B	33	Toyota Indy V8	HMS	PHX	MOT	INDY; 20	TXS	RIR	KAN	NSH	MIL	MIS	KTY	PPIR	NZR	CHI	FON	TX2		30th	12	
2005	Sam Schmidt Motorsports	Panoz GF09C	70	Chevrolet Indy V8	HMS	PHX	STP	MOT	INDY; 25	TXS	RIR	KAN	NSH	MIL	MIS	KTY	PPIR	SNM	CHI	WGL	FON	33rd	10	
2007	Racing Professionals Hemelgarn Racing	Dallara IR-05	91	Honda HI7R V8	HMS	STP	MOT	KAN	INDY; 23	MIL	TXS	IOW	RIR	WGL	NSH	MDO	MIS	KTY	SNM	DET	CHI	31st	12	

Years	Teams	Races	Poles	Wins	Podiums (Non-win)	Top 10s (Non-podium)	Indianapolis 500 Wins	Championships
9	6	25	2	1	1	9	0	0

==== Indianapolis 500 ====
Year	Chassis	Engine	Start	Finish	Team
1996	Reynard	Ford-Cosworth	15th	3rd	Della Penna
2000	Dallara	Oldsmobile	23rd	27th	Pagan
2001	Dallara	Oldsmobile	Failed to Qualify		Tri-Star
2001	Dallara	Oldsmobile	Stood by as relief driver for Tony Stewart		
2002	Dallara	Chevrolet	22nd	6th	Schmidt
2003	G-Force	Toyota	28th	28th	Schmidt
2004	G-Force	Toyota	30th	20th	Schmidt
2005	Panoz	Chevrolet	20th	25th	Schmidt
2007	Dallara	Honda	32nd	23rd	Hemelgarn/Racing Professionals

Sporting positions
Preceded by David Empringham	Toyota Atlantic Champion; 1995	Succeeded by Patrick Carpentier
