= Swift 007.i =

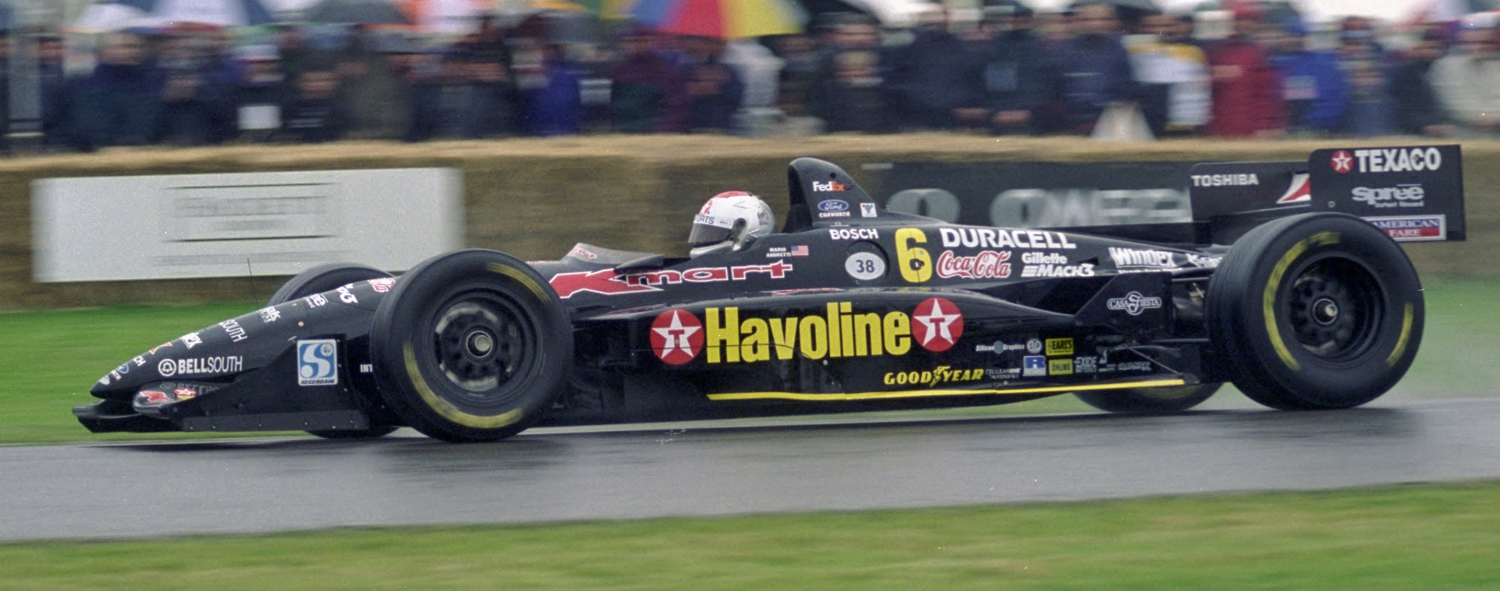
- Category: CART
- Constructor: Swift Engineering
- Designer: David Bruns
- Predecessor: none
- Successor: Swift 008.a

Technical specifications
- Chassis: carbon fiber monocoque
- Engine: Ford-XD 2,650 cc (161.7 cu in) V8 Turbo
- Weight: 1,500 lb (680.4 kg)
- Fuel: Methanol
- Tyres: Goodyear

Competition history
- Notable entrants: Newman-Haas Racing
- Notable drivers: (United States) Michael Andretti (Brazil) Christian Fittipaldi (Brazil) Roberto Moreno
- Debut: 1997 Marlboro Grand Prix of Miami
- First win: 1997 Marlboro Grand Prix of Miami
- Last win: 1997 Marlboro Grand Prix of Miami
- Last event: 1997 Marlboro 500
Races	Wins	Podiums
17	1	5
Poles	F/Laps	Titles
0	1	0
- Constructors' Championships: 3rd
- Drivers' Championships: 8th

The Swift 007.i was the first CART chassis designed and built by Swift Engineering. Newman-Haas Racing entered two cars during the 1997 CART season.

== History ==
Swift Engineering co-founder David Bruns designed the 007.i (i indicating IndyCar, the rival series to CART). The first foundations of designing a Champ Car were laid in 1993 when Swift Engineering built a $5 million windtunnel. Designing the car started in 1994 and the first car was completed in early 1997. The car was advertised as costing $450.000.

Newman-Haas Racing driver Michael Andretti conducted the first tests at Phoenix International Raceway. After the PIR test testing continued at Firebird International Raceway with Andretti and Christian Fittipaldi. In 1997 the Swift 007.i was the only CART chassis constructed in the United States. The Reynard, Lola and Penske chassis were all constructed in England. Newman-Haas Racing fitted the chassis with Ford-Cosworth engines.

Michael Andretti had a spectacular debut during the 1997 Grand Prix of Miami. Andretti won the race and set the fastest lap. It turned out to be the only win for the Swift chassis. Another four podium finishes were scored by Andretti. However, a number of retirements prevented him to be a championship contender. Andretti finished eighth in the championship standings. Teammate Christian Fittipaldi missed six races, his best finish were two fourth places. Roberto Moreno replaced Fittipaldi during six events score a best result of fifth.

== BOSS SuperCup Series ==
One of the Swift 007.i chassis later appeared in historic racing events. Mike Biangardi drove the car at Road Atlanta in the 2004 season.

== Complete CART results ==
(key) (Results in bold indicate pole position; results in italics indicate fastest lap)

Year	Team	Engine	Tyres	Driver	No.	1	2	3	4	5	6	7	8	9	10	11	12	13	14	15	16	17	Points	D.C.
1997	Newman/Haas Racing	Ford XD V8t	**G**			MIA	SRF	LBH	NAZ	RIO	GAT	MIL	DET	POR	CLE	TOR	MIC	MDO	ROA	VAN	LAG	CAL		
1997	Newman/Haas Racing	Ford XD V8t	**G**	(United States) Michael Andretti	6	1*	3	22	2	21	11*	2	2	8	23	4	21	8	26	16	27	19	**108**	**8th**
1997	Newman/Haas Racing	Ford XD V8t	**G**	(Brazil) Christian Fittipaldi	11	26	28							4	6	11	16	21	4	9	21	9	**42**	**15th**
1997	Newman/Haas Racing	Ford XD V8t	**G**	(Brazil) Roberto Moreno	11			24	14	18	25	10	5										**16**	**19th**
