= Gualter Salles =

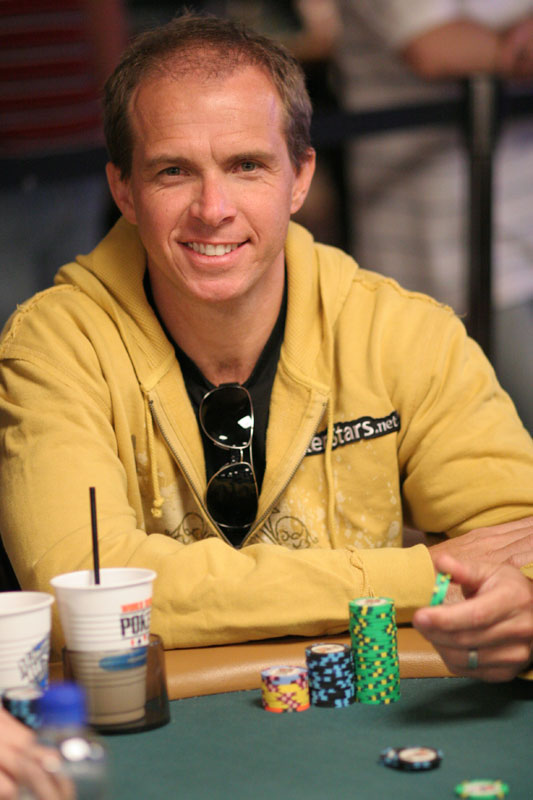
Gualter Salles

Gualter Salles (born September 28, 1970, Rio de Janeiro, Brazil), is an open wheel race car driver. He raced in the 1997-2000 and 2003 CART seasons, as well as one Indy Racing League event, totalling 49 IndyCar starts overall. He also competed in Stock Car Brasil between 2001 and 2007.

== Racing career ==
=== Early career ===
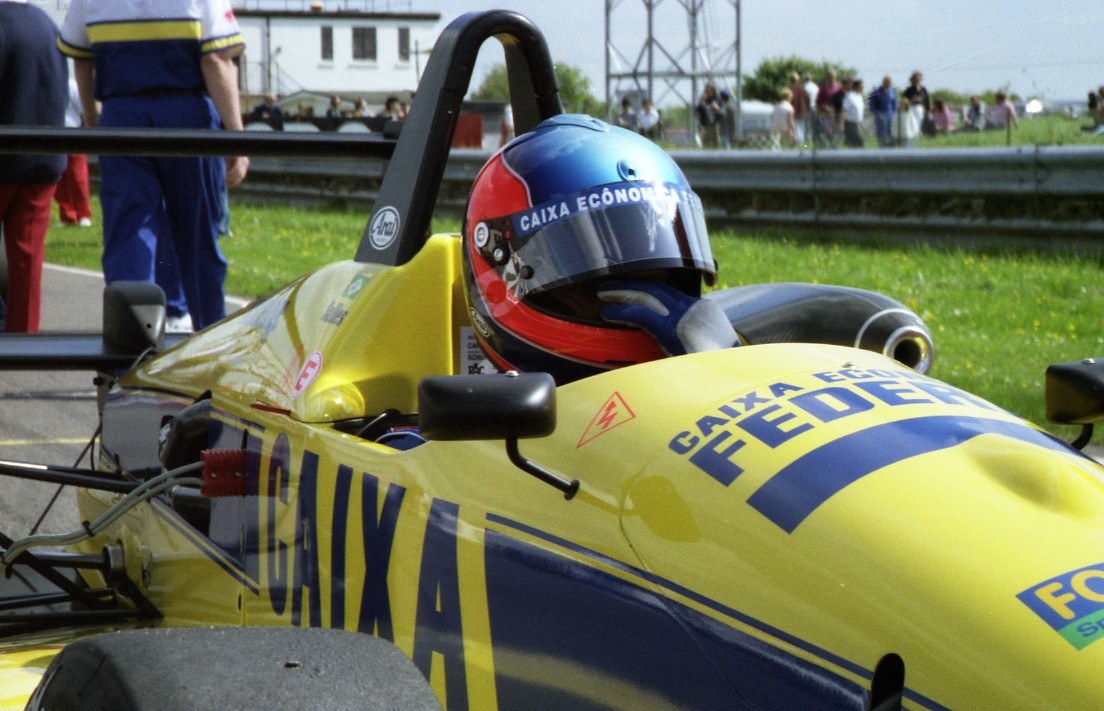
Gualter Salles Thruxton British F3 1994

Salles began his racing career in Europe in 1991 at the age of twenty, finishing eleventh in the Formula Opel Lotus Euroseries. He finished second the following year with two wins behind Gareth Rees. He competed in a handful of Formula 3 races across the British, Italian and South American series before getting a seat in British Formula 3 with West Surrey Racing. He finished tenth in 1994 and switched to Fortec Motorsport for a seventh place finish in 1995 and a lone win at Silverstone.

For 1996, Salles ventured into the United States and signed with Brian Stewart Racing to compete in Indy Lights. He scored a pole position for his second race at Long Beach, where he finished third, and had a three-win streak over the summer at Portland, Cleveland and Toronto that put him ten points adrift championship leader David Empringham. Bad results over the last three races demoted him to third behind fellow Brazilian driver Tony Kanaan.

=== CART ===
While Kanaan stayed one more year in Indy Lights and went on to win the championship, Salles stepped up to Indycars in the CART World Series, driving for the newly found Davis Racing. With the underfunded effort, Salles managed to finish seventh at Laguna Seca and tenth at the Michigan 500, enough for twentieth in the standings. He then went on to drive for Payton/Coyne Racing in a six-race program, sharing the ride with Dennis Vitolo. Salles surprised by qualifying fourth at Long Beach, and scored a single point at Motegi with a 12th place finish.

Salles had a variety of one-off outings in 1999 with Payton/Coyne and Bettenhausen Racing, as well as his lone Indy Racing League start at Tri-Star Motorsports. During the summer, he was hired by All American Racers to obtain feedback on their Eagle 997 chassis, contesting seven races, and finished the year with a top-ten appearance at Surfers Paradise for Bettenhausen.

Salles was hired by Dale Coyne in 2000, but after three retirements due to mechanical failures in an unsponsored car, he was replaced by funded driver Tarso Marques. Nevertheless, he came back to Coyne in the middle of the season after Takuya Kurosawa was ruled out for the rest of the season with an injury. Then again, all three races ended in retirement.

Salles did not find a ride for 2001 and switched his focus onto his native country to compete in Stock Car Brasil, before making a comeback to CART with Coyne in 2003. He first replaced Alex Yoong at Portland after the Malaysian ran into sponsorship issues, and then took over the other spot from Joel Camathias for the rest of the year, except for a couple of races where his stock car commitments took precedence. In his last CART race, he finished in a career-best 6th place at Surfers Paradise.

=== Other series ===
Salles had a brief sportscar foray in 2001, competing in the 24 Hours of Daytona and making a three-race gig with Panoz Motorsports in the American Le Mans Series. Beyond that, he mostly drove in Stock Car Brazil until 2007, driving Chevrolets with very limited success and a lone podium finish over seven seasons.

== Motorsports career results ==
=== American open–wheel racing results ===
(key)

==== Indy Lights ====
Year	Team	1	2	3	4	5	6	7	8	9	10	11	12	Rank	Points	Ref
1996	Brian Stewart Racing	MIA; 6	LBH; 3	NAZ; 11	MIS; 6	MIL; 4	DET; 22	POR; 1	CLE; 1	TOR; 1	TRO; 15	VAN; 21	LAG; 19	3rd	108	

==== CART ====
Year	Team	No.	Chassis	Engine	1	2	3	4	5	6	7	8	9	10	11	12	13	14	15	16	17	18	19	20	Rank	Points	Ref
1997	Davis Racing	77	Reynard 97i	Ford XD V8t	MIA; 15	SRF; 24	LBH; 18	NZR; 24	RIO; 19	STL; 12	MIL; 22	DET; 21	POR; 23	CLE; 19	TOR; 18	MIS; 10	MDO; 20	ROA; 13	VAN; 26	LS; 7	FON; 14				20th	10	
1998	Payton/Coyne Racing	34	Reynard 98i	Ford XD V8t	MIA	MOT; 12	LBH; 13	NZR	RIO; 20	STL	MIL	DET	POR	CLE	TOR; 21	MIS	MDO; 23	ROA; 17	VAN	LS	HOU	SRF	FON		28th	1	
1999	Payton/Coyne Racing	34	Reynard 98i	Ford XD V8t	MIA	MOT	LBH; 27	NZR																	26th	5	
1999	Bettenhausen Racing	16	Reynard 98i	Mercedes-Benz IC108E V8t					RIO; 17	STL	MIL												SRF; 10	FON	26th	5	
1999	All American Racers	36	Eagle 997	Toyota RV8D V8t								POR; 27	CLE; 13	ROA; 20	TOR; 25	MIS; 15	DET; 11	MDO; 18	CHI	VAN	LS	HOU			26th	5	
2000	Dale Coyne Racing	34	Lola B2K/00	Ford XF V8t	MIA; 20	LBH; 22	RIO; 14	MOT	NZR	MIL	DET	POR	CLE	TOR	MIS										30th	0	
2000	Dale Coyne Racing	19	Lola B2K/00	Ford XF V8t												CHI; 22	MDO; 23	ROA; 20	VAN	LS	STL	HOU	SRF	FON	30th	0	
2003	Dale Coyne Racing	11	Lola B02/00	Ford XFE V8t	STP	MTY	LBH	BRH	LAU	MIL; 13	LS														19th	11	
2003	Dale Coyne Racing	19	Lola B02/00	Ford XFE V8t								POR; 18	CLE; 17	TOR	VAN; DNS	ROA; 11	MDO; 17	MTL; 12	DEN; 18	MIA	MXC; 15	SRF; 6	FON; NH		19th	11	

==== Indy Racing League ====
Year	Team	Chassis	Engine	1	2	3	4	5	6	7	8	9	10	11	Rank	Points	Ref
1999	Tri-Star Motorsports	Dallara IR9	Oldsmobile Aurora V8	WDW; 23	PHX	CLT	INDY	TXS	PPIR	ATL	DOV	PPI2	LVS	TX2	44th	7	
