= Lola T97/00 =

Racing car designed and built by Lola Cars

- Category: CART IndyCar
- Constructor: Lola
- Predecessor: Lola T96/00
- Successor: Lola T98/00

Technical specifications
- Length: 4,978 mm (196 in)
- Width: 2,032 mm (80 in)
- Height: 940 mm (37 in)
- Axle track: 1,753 mm (69 in) (Front); 1,638 mm (64 in) (Rear)
- Wheelbase: 3,048 mm (120 in)
- Engine: Ford/Cosworth XB; Honda turbo Indy V8 engine 2.65 L (2,650 cc; 162 cu in) mid-engined
- Transmission: 6-speed manual
- Weight: 1,550 lb (700 kg)
- Fuel: Methanol
- Tyres: Goodyear

Competition history
- Debut: 1997 Grand Prix of Miami

The Lola T97/00 is an open-wheel racing car chassis, designed and built by Lola Cars that competed in the CART open-wheel racing series, for competition in the 1997 IndyCar season. It was not very successful, with Lola scoring no wins or pole positions that season. It was mainly powered by the 850 hp (630 kW) Ford/Cosworth XD turbo engine, but also used the Honda turbo Indy V8 engine.
