= Reynard 97I =

Racing car designed and built by Reynard Racing Cars

- Category: CART IndyCar
- Constructor: Reynard Racing Cars
- Predecessor: Reynard 96I
- Successor: Reynard 98I

Technical specifications
- Engine: Ford/Cosworth XB/XD; Honda Indy V8 turbo Mercedes-Benz IC108; Toyota RV8B 2.65 L (2,650 cc; 162 cu in) V8 mid-engined
- Transmission: 6-speed sequential manual
- Weight: 1,550 lb (700 kg)
- Fuel: Methanol
- Tyres: Goodyear Eagle

Competition history
- Debut: 1997 Grand Prix of Miami; Miami, Florida

The Reynard 97I is an open-wheel racing car designed and built by Reynard Racing Cars that competed in the 1997 IndyCar season. It won the constructors' and drivers' titles later that year, being driven by Alex Zanardi.
