= 1996 Michigan 500 =

Coordinates: 42°03′58.68″N 84°14′29.18″W

(United States) 1996 Michigan 500
Race details
- Race 12 of 16 in the 1996 CART season
- Date: July 28, 1996
- Official name: 1996 Marlboro 500
- Location: Michigan International Speedway, Brooklyn, Michigan, United States
- Course: Permanent racing facility 2.000 mi / 3.219 km
- Distance: 250 laps 500.000 mi / 804.672 km
- Weather: Partly Cloudy with temperatures up to 77 °F (25 °C); wind speeds reaching up to 10 miles per hour (16 km/h)

Pole position
- Driver: (United States) Jimmy Vasser (Chip Ganassi Racing)
- Time: 234.665 mph (377.657 km/h)

Podium
- First: (Brazil) Andre Ribeiro (Tasman Motorsports)
- Second: (United States) Bryan Herta (Rahal Letterman Racing)
- Third: (Brazil) Mauricio Gugelmin (PacWest Racing)

The 1996 Michigan 500, the sixteenth running of the event, was held at the Michigan International Speedway in Brooklyn, Michigan, on Sunday, July 28, 1996. Branded as the 1996 Marlboro 500 for sponsorship reasons, the race was won by Andre Ribeiro, his last Indy Car victory. The event was race number 12 of 16 in the 1996 PPG Indy Car World Series.

== Background ==
Tony George, owner of the Indianapolis Motor Speedway, formed the Indy Racing League as an alternative to CART. While the Indianapolis 500 had continued to be sanctioned by the United States Auto Club (USAC) since the formation of CART in 1979, CART teams and drivers represented the vast majority of the Indy field, and USAC had taken steps to ensure that the technical specifications for Indy did not preclude CART teams from participating. In 1996, however, following his creation of the IRL, George stipulated that 25 of the 33 starting positions at Indy would be reserved for the top 25 cars which ran events in his series. This move created potential scheduling conflicts with CART-sanctioned events.

Interpreting this policy as a lockout of CART teams, the CART board agreed to stage the U.S. 500 at an alternative venue on Memorial Day weekend, the traditional date for the Indianapolis 500. George, on the other hand, viewed the refusal of CART teams to compete for the remaining eight positions on the Indy grid as a walkout/boycott.

On December 18, 1995, CART teams, convinced that they were being deliberately locked out from the 1996 Indy 500, and the victims of a "power grab" by Tony George, announced their intentions to boycott the event. They jointly announced plans for a new race, the Inaugural U.S. 500, to be held at Michigan International Speedway the same day.

The 1996 U.S. 500 was held at Michigan at the same time at the Indianapolis 500. The event was won by Jimmy Vasser. Despite the creation of a second 500-mile race, the Marlboro 500 continued unchanged in late July as it had for the last 16 years. Teams and drivers entered the race with the belief that the event was not as an important as the U.S. 500.

Two weeks before the Marlboro 500, Jeff Krosnoff died in a crash at the 1996 Molson Indy Toronto. On Friday, July 26, a memorial service was held for members of the paddock at Michigan. In addition, flags at the track were raised to half mast in honor of Krosnoff and track worker Gary Avrin who also died in the crash.

On the weekend of the Marlboro 500, the Championship Drivers Association presented the widow of Scott Brayton with an annuity to pay for the college education of Brayton's daughter Carly. With Brayton competing in the Indianapolis 500 while CART was at the U.S. 500, CART drivers were unable to pay tribute to the Michigan native until the Michigan 500.

The track expected an attendance of between 60,000 and 80,000 spectators. 110,000 fans were at the U.S. 500 in May and 127,000 were at NASCAR's Winston Cup race in June.

== Practice and Time Trials ==
In the first day of practice on Friday, July 26, Andre Ribeiro posted the fastest lap with an average speed around the entire track of 235.714 mph. Ribeiro reached a top speed of 251.903 mph at the end of the backstretch. Alex Zanardi was second fastest at 235.329 mph. Team Penske teammates Paul Tracy and Al Unser Jr. were third and fourth respectively. U.S. 500 champion Jimmy Vasser was fifth.

In Saturday morning's practice session, Paul Tracy spun and hit the wall with the rear of his car. He was hospitalized with a chip fracture of the sixth vertebra and withdrawn from the race.

Jimmy Vasser won the pole with a lap of 234.665 mph. The lap broke the track record set by Mario Andretti in the 1993 Michigan 500. Alex Zanardi was second fastest at 233.501 mph. Completing the front row was Greg Moore, also with a speed of 233.501 mph. Al Unser Jr. was fourth, Emerson Fittipaldi was fifth, Adrian Fernandez was sixth.

== Race ==
A crowd estimated at 65,000 attended the Marlboro 500.

When the field came to take the green flag, CART officials did not approve of how far the field was spread out and waved off the green flag. The cars took the green flag the second time around. Emerson Fittipaldi moved to the outside of Greg Moore and attempted to take the third position in turn one. Moore's car slid up the track and hit Fittipaldi's in the left rear and spun him backwards into the wall.

Complaining of back pain, Fittipaldi was airlifted to a local hospital where he was diagnosed with a fractured seventh vertebra and partial collapse of the left lung. Fittipaldi never raced in IndyCar again.

Under caution for Fittipaldi's crash, Andre Ribeiro pitted and returned to the track. New CART rules stated that you could not blend back into the line of cars after exiting the pits, but instead had to wait for the entire field to go by. Ribeiro was unaware of this new rule and angered to be placed behind cars that didn't make a pit stop.

On the restart, Zanardi took the lead from Vasser. Recovering from the crash with Fittipaldi, Greg Moore took the lead on lap 30 with a pass on the outside of Zanardi. After a caution for debris, Moore and Zanardi swapped the lead several times before Moore took the lead. A debris caution on lap 67 returned Zanardi to the lead, which he held for a total of 74 laps.

On lap 128, race-leader Zanardi drifted high and hit the wall in turn four. Zanardi's wheel fell off and hit the right-rear wheel of Vasser's car. The wheel then hit Gil de Ferran's car and broke off his left side mirror, left a tire mark next to his windshield, and tore off the leftside endplate on his rear wing. "It didn't hit my head so I guess it was my lucky day," de Ferran said, "but it was close." Both cars lost several laps making repairs.

Zanardi's crash put Andre Ribeiro in the lead for the first time. Ribeiro led for the next 83 laps until green flag pit stops.

With 20 laps remaining, Ribeiro caught a group of lapped cars and was slowed. Defending Michigan 500 champion, Scott Pruett caught and passed Ribeiro to take the lead.

Ribeiro repassed Pruett for the lead with 16 laps remaining. One lap later, Parker Johnstone crashed in turn four. Johnstone collapsed on the ground next to his car and was airlifted to the hospital with bruised knees and a sore neck. Under caution for the Johnstone crash, Scott Pruett retired from the race with an engine valve problem.

The restart set up an eight lap run to the finish. As Ribeiro pulled away, Bryan Herta passed Mauricio Gugelmin for second. Ribeiro beat Herta by 1.378 seconds. It was his third and final IndyCar win.

== Box score ==
Finish	Grid	No	Name	Team	Chassis	Engine	Tire	Laps	Time/Status	Led	Points
1	8	31	(Brazil) André Ribeiro	Tasman Motorsports	Lola T96/00	Honda	F	250	3:16:33.425	114	21
2	11	28	(United States) Bryan Herta	Team Rahal	Reynard 96I	Mercedes-Benz	G	250	+1.378	0	16
3	13	17	(Brazil) Maurício Gugelmin	PacWest Racing	Reynard 96I	Ford	G	250	+2.292	3	14
4	4	2	(United States) Al Unser Jr.	Marlboro Team Penske	Penske PC-25	Mercedes-Benz	G	249	+1 Lap	0	12
5	14	16	(Sweden) Stefan Johansson	Bettenhausen Motorsports	Reynard 96I	Mercedes-Benz	G	248	+2 Laps	0	10
6	21	21	(United Kingdom) Mark Blundell	PacWest Racing	Reynard 96I	Ford	G	248	+2 Laps	0	8
7	15	1	(Brazil) Raul Boesel	Brahma Sports Team	Reynard 96I	Ford	G	247	+3 Laps	0	6
8	25	5	(United States) Robby Gordon	Walker Racing	Reynard 96I	Ford	G	246	+4 Laps	0	5
9	1	12	(United States) Jimmy Vasser	Chip Ganassi Racing	Reynard 96I	Honda	F	245	+5 Laps	15	5
10	19	11	(Brazil) Christian Fittipaldi	Newman/Haas Racing	Lola T96/00	Ford	G	245	+5 Laps	0	3
11	18	7	(Chile) Eliseo Salazar	Team Scandia	Lola T96/00	Ford	G	245	+5 Laps	0	2
12	17	10	(United States) Davy Jones	Galles Racing	Lola T96/00	Mercedes-Benz	G	242	+8 Laps	0	1
13	7	20	(United States) Scott Pruett	Patrick Racing	Lola T96/00	Ford	F	241	Engine	6	0
14	21	36	(Argentina) Juan Manuel Fangio II	All American Racers	Eagle Mk-V	Toyota	G	240	+10 Laps	0	0
15	20	19	(Japan) Hiro Matsushita	Payton-Coyne Racing	Lola T96/00	Ford	F	240	+10 Laps	0	0
16	24	98	(United States) P. J. Jones	All American Racers	Eagle Mk-V	Toyota	G	234	+16 Laps	0	0
17	3	99	(Canada) Greg Moore	Forsythe Racing	Reynard 96I	Mercedes-Benz	F	227	+23 Laps	31	0
18	10	49	(United States) Parker Johnstone	Brix Comptech Racing	Reynard 96I	Honda	F	220	Crash	0	0
19	16	8	(Brazil) Gil de Ferran	Hall Racing	Reynard 96I	Honda	G	209	Suspension	0	0
20	6	32	(Mexico) Adrián Fernández	Tasman Motorsports	Lola T96/00	Honda	F	169	Clutch	0	0
21	2	4	(Italy) Alex Zanardi	Chip Ganassi Racing	Reynard 96I	Honda	F	128	Crash	74	0
22	12	6	(United States) Michael Andretti	Newman/Haas Racing	Lola T96/00	Ford	G	99	Alternator	7	0
23	22	34	(Brazil) Roberto Moreno	Payton-Coyne Racing	Lola T96/00	Ford	F	93	Crash	0	0
24	9	18	(United States) Bobby Rahal	Team Rahal	Reynard 96I	Mercedes-Benz	G	41	Engine	0	0
25	5	9	(Brazil) Emerson Fittipaldi	Hogan-Penske Racing	Penske PC-25	Mercedes-Benz	G	1	Crash	0	0

=== Failed to qualify ===
- (Canada) Paul Tracy (#3) - withdrawn, injured in practice crash

=== Race statistics ===
Lap Leaders
Laps	Leader
1–15	Jimmy Vasser
16–29	Alex Zanardi
30–45	Greg Moore
46	Michael Andretti
47–48	Alex Zanardi
49	Greg Moore
50–51	Alex Zanardi
52–65	Greg Moore
66–71	Michael Andretti
72–127	Alex Zanardi
128–210	André Ribeiro
211	Scott Pruett
212–214	Maurício Gugelmin
215–229	André Ribeiro
230–234	Scott Pruett
235–250	André Ribeiro

Cautions: 8 for 59 laps
Laps	Reason
1	Start waived off
2–15	Emerson Fittipaldi crash turn 2
40–45	Debris
65–69	Debris
99–106	Roberto Moreno crash turn 4
128–136	Alex Zanardi crash tri-oval
168–174	Debris tri-oval
234–242	Parker Johnstone crash turn 4

== Broadcasting ==
The Michigan 500 was broadcast live on television by ABC. Paul Page was the lead announcer and was joined by Danny Sullivan as color commentator.
