= 1996 ITT Automotive Grand Prix of Detroit =

Coordinates: 42°20′36″N 82°58′28″W

(United States) 1996 ITT Automotive Detroit
Race details
- Race 8 of 16 in the 1996 PPG Indy Car World Series season
- Date: June 9, 1996
- Official name: ITT Automotive Grand Prix of Detroit
- Location: Detroit Belle Isle street circuit, Detroit, United States
- Course: Temporary street course 2.1 mi / 3.4 km
- Distance: 77 (72 laps completed) laps mi / km
- Weather: Temperatures reaching up to 65.8 °F (18.8 °C); wind speeds up to 12.8 miles per hour (20.6 km/h)

Pole position
- Driver: (United States) Scott Pruett (Patrick Racing)
- Time: 1:11:802

Podium
- First: (United States) Michael Andretti (Newman/Haas Racing)
- Second: (Brazil) Christian Fittipaldi (Newman/Haas Racing)
- Third: (Brazil) Gil de Ferran (Jim Hall Racing)

The 1996 ITT Automotive Grand Prix of Detroit was a CART race which happened at the Detroit Belle Isle street circuit. It happened on June 9, 1996. It was the 8th round of the 1996 IndyCar season.

== Race ==
=== Lap 2 ===
Christian Fittipaldi takes the lead from Scott Pruett.

=== Lap 4 ===
Top 6: Christian Fittipaldi, Gil de Ferran, Paul Tracy, Scott Pruett, Robby Gordon and Michael Andretti. First full course caution was out after Gordon had hit the tire wall. Green flag came out on lap 10.

=== Lap 13 ===
Top 12: Christian Fittipaldi, Gil de Ferran, Paul Tracy, Michael Andretti, Scott Pruett, André Ribeiro, Adrian Fernandez, Al Unser Jr., Bobby Rahal, Parker Johnstone, Mark Blundell and Alex Zanardi.

=== Some laps later ===
Second full course caution, as Greg Moore and André Ribeiro crashed. Neither the Canadian, nor the Brazilian had retired. One lap later, Gil de Ferran spun after leaving the pits.

=== Lap 25 ===
Top 6: Christian Fittipaldi, Michael Andretti, Paul Tracy, Gil de Ferran, Al Unser Jr. and Bobby Rahal. Green flag came out on lap 31.

=== Laps 36-37 ===
At the very same curve, Emerson Fittipaldi and André Ribeiro crashed, but not simultaneously. Fittipaldi brushed the wall on lap 36. Ribeiro would do the same on the following lap. Both drivers retired.

=== Lap 46 ===
Shades of 1994 came out, as Al Unser Jr. and Paul Tracy once again were involved into a crash. Two years before, both drivers collided, as Little Al went into the tyre barrier. The same fate happened on lap 46 of the 1996 race. Third caution was out. Green flag came out on lap 53.

=== Lap 57 ===
Top 6: Christian Fittipaldi, Andretti, de Ferran, Rahal, Tracy and Pruett.

=== Lap 61 ===
Fourth caution was out, as Bobby Rahal had a hard crash.

=== Lap 65 ===
Green flag came out. Christian Fittipaldi went wide and Michael Andretti takes the lead. Meanwhile, Paul Tracy crashed very hard. Fifth full course caution. Few laps later, came the green flag.

=== 1 lap after the restart ===
Scott Pruett caused the sixth full course caution as he crashed into the tyre barrier. Green flag came out with two minutes left.

=== Lap 72 ===
As the race completed the 2-hour limit, Michael Andretti won the race on lap 72. 5 laps before the predicted laps.

== Box score ==
Finish	Grid	No	Name	Team	Chassis	Engine	Tire	Laps	Time/Status	Led	Points
1	9	6	(United States) Michael Andretti	Newman/Haas Racing	Lola T96/00	Ford	G	72	2:00:45.451	7	20
2	6	11	(Brazil) Christian Fittipaldi	Newman/Haas Racing	Lola T96/00	Ford	G	72	+1.409	64	17
3	7	8	(Brazil) Gil de Ferran	Hall Racing	Reynard 96I	Honda	G	72	+4.282	0	14
4	3	32	(Mexico) Adrián Fernández	Tasman Motorsports	Lola T96/00	Honda	F	72	+7.428	0	12
5	15	21	(United Kingdom) Mark Blundell	PacWest Racing	Reynard 96I	Ford	G	72	+9.207	0	10
6	23	10	(United States) Eddie Lawson	Galles Racing	Lola T96/00	Mercedes-Benz	G	72	+9.630	0	8
7	22	16	(Sweden) Stefan Johansson	Bettenhausen Motorsports	Reynard 96I	Mercedes-Benz	G	72	+9.867	0	6
8	18	1	(Brazil) Raul Boesel	Brahma Sports Team	Reynard 96I	Ford	G	72	+11.170	0	5
9	25	98	(United States) P. J. Jones	All American Racers	Eagle Mk-V	Toyota	G	72	+15.840	0	4
10	1	20	(United States) Scott Pruett	Patrick Racing	Lola T96/00	Ford	F	72	+25.192	1	4
11	5	4	(Italy) Alex Zanardi	Chip Ganassi Racing	Reynard 96I	Honda	F	71	+1 Lap	0	2
12	20	12	(United States) Jimmy Vasser	Chip Ganassi Racing	Reynard 96I	Honda	F	71	+1 Lap	0	1
13	16	28	(United States) Bryan Herta	Team Rahal	Reynard 96I	Mercedes-Benz	G	71	+1 Lap	0	0
14	4	49	(United States) Parker Johnstone	Brix Comptech Racing	Reynard 96I	Honda	F	71	+1 Lap	0	0
15	21	25	(United States) Jeff Krosnoff	Arciero-Wells Racing	Reynard 96I	Toyota	F	71	+1 Lap	0	0
16	19	17	(Brazil) Maurício Gugelmin	PacWest Racing	Reynard 96I	Ford	G	71	+1 Lap	0	0
17	11	3	(Canada) Paul Tracy	Marlboro Team Penske	Penske PC-25	Mercedes-Benz	G	71	+1 Lap	0	0
18	24	36	(Argentina) Juan Manuel Fangio II	All American Racers	Eagle Mk-V	Toyota	G	71	+1 Lap	0	0
19	26	19	(Japan) Hiro Matsushita	Payton-Coyne Racing	Lola T96/00	Ford	F	69	+3 Laps	0	0
20	14	99	(Canada) Greg Moore	Forsythe Racing	Reynard 96I	Mercedes-Benz	F	67	+5 Laps	0	0
21	8	18	(United States) Bobby Rahal	Team Rahal	Reynard 96I	Mercedes-Benz	G	60	Crash	0	0
22	12	2	(United States) Al Unser Jr.	Marlboro Team Penske	Penske PC-25	Mercedes-Benz	G	46	Crash	0	0
23	13	34	(Brazil) Roberto Moreno	Payton-Coyne Racing	Lola T96/00	Ford	F	41	Exhaust	0	0
24	2	31	(Brazil) André Ribeiro	Tasman Motorsports	Lola T96/00	Honda	F	37	Crash	0	0
25	17	9	(Brazil) Emerson Fittipaldi	Hogan-Penske Racing	Penske PC-25	Mercedes-Benz	G	36	Crash	0	0
26	10	5	(United States) Robby Gordon	Walker Racing	Reynard 96I	Ford	G	3	Crash	0	0

=== Failed to qualify ===
- (Mexico) Michel Jourdain Jr. (#22) - withdrawn after Sunday's warmup (unknown reason)

=== Race statistics ===
Lap Leaders
Laps	Leader
1	Scott Pruett
2–65	Christian Fittipaldi
66–72	Michael Andretti

Cautions: 6 for 24 laps
Laps	Reason
4–9	Robby Gordon crash turn 8
24–30	André Ribeiro and Greg Moore crash turn 13
47–52	Al Unser Jr. crash turn 4
62–65	Bobby Rahal crash turn 13
67	Paul Tracy and Scott Pruett crash turn 7
69–70	Scott Pruett crash turn 4

== Point standings ==
After 8 of 16 races

1. Jimmy Vasser 98 points
2. Al Unser Jr. 75 points
3. Michael Andretti 71 points
4. Christian Fittipaldi 58 points
5. Gil de Ferran 55 points
6. Scott Pruett 54 points
