= 1996 Bosch Spark Plug Grand Prix =

(United States) 1996 Nazareth
Race details
- Race 5 of 16 in the 1996 PPG Indy Car World Series season
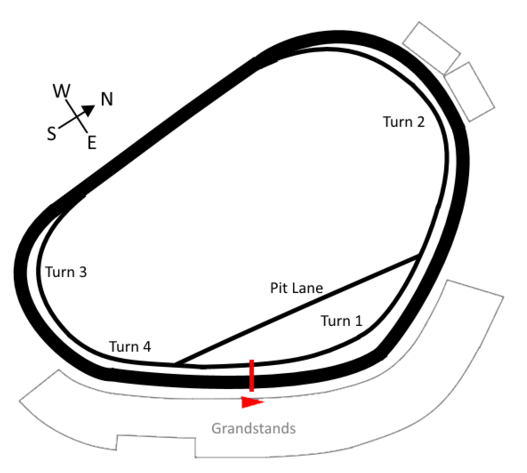
- Map of Nazareth Speedway
- Date: April 28, 1996
- Official name: Bosch Spark Plug Grand Prix
- Location: Nazareth, Pennsylvania, United States
- Course: Oval; 1.000 mi / 1.609 km
- Distance: 200 laps 200.000 mi / 321.869 km

Pole position
- Driver: (Canada) (Canada) Paul Tracy (Marlboro Team Penske)
- Time: 18.874

Fastest lap
- Driver: (Brazil) (Brazil) Emerson Fittipaldi (Hogan-Penske Racing)
- Time: 20.388 (on lap 2 of 200)

Podium
- First: (United States) (United States) Michael Andretti (Newman/Haas Racing)
- Second: (Canada) (Canada) Greg Moore (Forsythe Racing)
- Third: (United States) (United States) Al Unser Jr. (Marlboro Team Penske)

The 1996 Bosch Spark Plug Grand Prix was a CART race which happened at the Nazareth Speedway on April 28, 1996. It was the 5th round of the 1996 PPG Indy Car World Series season.

== Qualifying ==
Penske Racing driver Paul Tracy set the a mph speed of 190.737 mph, and also, the pole. It was a New Track Record.

== Race ==
=== Start - Lap 95 ===
At lap 15, the first caution came out as Hiro Matsushita collided with Juan Manuel Fangio II. The restart came out at lap 22. The top ten at lap 25 were: Paul Tracy, Emerson Fittipaldi, Scott Pruett, Michael Andretti, Jimmy Vasser, Al Unser Jr., Bobby Rahal, Robby Gordon, Greg Moore and Christian Fittipaldi. At lap 53, Hiro Matsushita was the first driver to retire. At lap 79, Andretti stalled his car after a 13.4 pitstop. He continued in the race. At the following lap, the race leader Paul Tracy hit three mechanics in one move then after that he was able to stop his car in his pit stall. The mechanics were not badly injured, but were taken to the hospital. At lap 89, Paul Tracy received a black flag penalty because of the incident with his mechanics. The top six at lap 95 was: Michael Andretti, Al Unser Jr., Greg Moore, Emerson Fittipaldi, Bobby Rahal and Christian Fittipaldi.

=== Lap 115- Lap 141 ===
At lap 115, the second caution came out, as Roberto Moreno lost one of his rear wheels. At the following lap, Gil de Ferran retired after having suspension problems due to colliding with Adrian Fernandez in the pits. The restart came out at lap 128. At lap 141, the top twelve was: Michael Andretti, Emerson Fittipaldi, Al Unser Jr., Greg Moore, Bobby Rahal, Jimmy Vasser, Paul Tracy, Scott Pruett, Christian Fittipaldi, Raul Boesel, Robby Gordon and Adrian Fernandez.

=== Closing stages. 33 laps to go ===
With 33 laps to go, the third caution came out as Robby Gordon hit the wall at turn one. He retired. When the restart would come out, Raul Boesel's engine blew up. The restart came out with 23 laps to go. Andretti's lead was growing and no problems happened to him as he won the race.

== Box score ==
Finish	Grid	No	Name	Team	Chassis	Engine	Tire	Laps	Time/Status	Led	Points
1	5	6	(United States) Michael Andretti	Newman/Haas Racing	Lola T96/00	Ford	G	200	1:25:08.074	113	21
2	13	99	(Canada) Greg Moore	Forsythe Racing	Reynard 96I	Mercedes-Benz	F	200	+12.213	0	16
3	6	2	(United States) Al Unser Jr.	Marlboro Team Penske	Penske PC-25	Mercedes-Benz	G	200	+15.044	0	14
4	2	9	(Brazil) Emerson Fittipaldi	Hogan-Penske Racing	Penske PC-25	Mercedes-Benz	G	200	+15.144	0	12
5	1	3	(Canada) Paul Tracy	Marlboro Team Penske	Penske PC-25	Mercedes-Benz	G	199	+1 Lap	87	11
6	8	18	(United States) Bobby Rahal	Team Rahal	Reynard 96I	Mercedes-Benz	G	199	+1 Lap	0	8
7	3	12	(United States) Jimmy Vasser	Chip Ganassi Racing	Reynard 96I	Honda	F	199	+1 Lap	0	6
8	4	20	(United States) Scott Pruett	Patrick Racing	Lola T96/00	Ford	F	198	+2 Laps	0	5
9	10	11	(Brazil) Christian Fittipaldi	Newman/Haas Racing	Lola T96/00	Ford	G	197	+3 Laps	0	4
10	18	32	(Mexico) Adrián Fernández	Tasman Motorsports	Lola T96/00	Honda	F	196	+4 Laps	0	3
11	12	28	(United States) Bryan Herta	Team Rahal	Reynard 96I	Mercedes-Benz	G	196	+4 Laps	0	2
12	15	31	(Brazil) André Ribeiro	Tasman Motorsports	Lola T96/00	Honda	F	196	+4 Laps	0	1
13	9	4	(Italy) Alex Zanardi	Chip Ganassi Racing	Reynard 96I	Honda	F	193	+7 Laps	0	0
14	20	15	(United States) Mike Groff	Walker Racing	Reynard 96I	Ford	G	192	+8 Laps	0	0
15	16	17	(Brazil) Maurício Gugelmin	PacWest Racing	Reynard 96I	Ford	G	190	+10 Laps	0	0
16	19	21	(Italy) Teo Fabi	PacWest Racing	Reynard 96I	Ford	G	188	+12 Laps	0	0
17	21	10	(United States) Eddie Lawson	Galles Racing	Lola T96/00	Mercedes-Benz	G	186	+14 Laps	0	0
18	23	25	(United States) Jeff Krosnoff	Arciero-Wells Racing	Reynard 96I	Toyota	F	186	+14 Laps	0	0
19	14	16	(Sweden) Stefan Johansson	Bettenhausen Motorsports	Reynard 96I	Mercedes-Benz	G	184	+16 Laps	0	0
20	22	49	(United States) Parker Johnstone	Brix Comptech Racing	Reynard 96I	Honda	F	180	+20 Laps	0	0
21	11	1	(Brazil) Raul Boesel	Brahma Sports Team	Reynard 96I	Ford	G	167	Engine	0	0
22	7	5	(United States) Robby Gordon	Walker Racing	Reynard 96I	Ford	G	164	Crash	0	0
23	17	8	(Brazil) Gil de Ferran	Hall Racing	Reynard 96I	Honda	G	116	Crash	0	0
24	24	34	(Brazil) Roberto Moreno	Payton-Coyne Racing	Lola T96/00	Ford	F	102	Crash	0	0
25	25	36	(Argentina) Juan Manuel Fangio II	All American Racers	Eagle Mk-V	Toyota	G	59	Engine	0	0
26	26	19	(Japan) Hiro Matsushita	Payton-Coyne Racing	Lola T96/00	Ford	F	19	Suspension	0	0

=== Race statistics ===
Lap Leaders
Laps	Leader
1–87	Paul Tracy
88–200	Michael Andretti

Cautions: 4 for 28 laps
Laps	Reason
17–21	Juan Manuel Fangio II spin turn 4
115–127	Roberto Moreno tow-in
167–169	Robby Gordon brushed wall turn 3
170–176	Raul Boesel engine

== Points Standings after 5 races ==
1. Jimmy Vasser 73 points
2. Al Unser Jr. 53 points
3. Scott Pruett 49 points
4. Greg Moore 36 points
5. Gil de Ferran 33 points
6. Christian Fittipaldi 32 points

== Notes ==
1. Last race - Teo Fabi
2. After this race, Mark Blundell, who broke his foot in Brazil was cleared by CART officials to race in the next round: The US 500.
3. For the last time CART decided to run a 200 lap race in Nazareth Speedway. For 1997 until 2002 when CART had its final race there, it was a 225 lap race. After 2002, the race went to Indy Racing League, but it was still a 225 lap race.
