= 1996 Miller Genuine Draft 200 =

(United States) 1996 Miller Genuine Draft 200
Race details
- Race 7 of 16 in the 1996 IndyCar season
- Date: June 2, 1996
- Official name: Miller Genuine Draft 200
- Location: Milwaukee Mile, West Allis, United States
- Course: Permanent racing facility 1.000 mi / 1.609 km
- Distance: 200 laps 200 mi / 321.868 km
- Weather: Temperatures reaching up to 80.1 °F (26.7 °C); wind speeds approaching 15 miles per hour (24 km/h)

Pole position
- Driver: (Canada) Paul Tracy (Penske Racing)
- Time: 176.058 mph

Podium
- First: (United States) Michael Andretti (Newman/Haas Racing)
- Second: (United States) Al Unser Jr. (Penske Racing)
- Third: (Canada) Paul Tracy (Penske Racing)

Chronology
Previous	Next
1995	1997

The 1996 Miller Genuine Draft 200 was a CART race that happened at the Milwaukee Mile. It happened on June 2, 1996. It was the 7th round of the 1996 IndyCar season.

== Race ==
=== Lap 1 ===
At the start of the race, Parker Johnstone spun at turn 2. The first full-course caution was out.

=== Lap 13 ===
Top 6: Paul Tracy, Emerson Fittipaldi, Gil de Ferran, Christian Fittipaldi, Robby Gordon and Michael Andretti.

=== Lap 38 ===
Michael Andretti takes the lead after overtaking Paul Tracy at turn 4.

=== Lap 71 ===
Hiro Matsushita had a fire on the back of his car during his pitstop.

=== Lap 78 ===
After pitstops, Al Unser Jr. leads, with Michael Andretti in second.

=== Lap 100 ===
Halfway through -> Top 6: Al Unser Jr., Michael Andretti, Paul Tracy, Emerson Fittipaldi, Christian Fittipaldi and Greg Moore.

=== Lap 128 ===
Second full course caution was out after Raul Boesel had a big crash on turn 2. The green flag came out at lap 148.

=== Lap 177 ===
Top 6: Al Unser Jr., Michael Andretti, Emerson Fittipaldi, Paul Tracy, Greg Moore and Christian Fittipaldi.

=== Lap 183 ===
Third full course caution came out, as Mark Blundell was the third victim of turn 2 wall.

=== Lap 195. 5 to go ===
The green flag came out. Michael Andretti took the lead from Al Unser Jr. The Penske Racing driver also lost second place for his teammate Paul Tracy.

=== Lap 197. 3 to go ===
Fourth full course caution came out, as Greg Moore nearly lost the car coming out turn 4. The restart came out at lap 199.

=== Lap 200. Last Lap ===
Fifth full-course caution. Parker Johnstone crashed at turn 3. Michael Andretti won under the yellow flag.

== Box score ==
Finish	Grid	No	Name	Team	Chassis	Engine	Tire	Laps	Time/Status	Led	Points
1	5	6	(United States) Michael Andretti	Newman/Haas Racing	Lola T96/00	Ford	G	200	1:33:32.649	59	20
2	11	2	(United States) Al Unser Jr.	Marlboro Team Penske	Penske PC-25	Mercedes-Benz	G	200	+0.146	98	17
3	1	3	(Canada) Paul Tracy	Marlboro Team Penske	Penske PC-25	Mercedes-Benz	G	200	+0.940	43	15
4	2	9	(Brazil) Emerson Fittipaldi	Hogan-Penske Racing	Penske PC-25	Mercedes-Benz	G	200	+1.451	0	12
5	18	99	(Canada) Greg Moore	Forsythe Racing	Reynard 96I	Mercedes-Benz	F	200	+24.580	0	10
6	3	11	(Brazil) Christian Fittipaldi	Newman/Haas Racing	Lola T96/00	Ford	G	199	+1 Lap	0	8
7	13	18	(United States) Bobby Rahal	Team Rahal	Reynard 96I	Mercedes-Benz	G	197	+3 Laps	0	6
8	16	31	(Brazil) André Ribeiro	Tasman Motorsports	Lola T96/00	Honda	F	197	+3 Laps	0	5
9	6	8	(Brazil) Gil de Ferran	Hall Racing	Reynard 96I	Honda	G	196	+4 Laps	0	4
10	14	12	(United States) Jimmy Vasser	Chip Ganassi Racing	Reynard 96I	Honda	F	196	+4 Laps	0	3
11	17	32	(Mexico) Adrián Fernández	Tasman Motorsports	Lola T96/00	Honda	F	196	+4 Laps	0	2
12	15	20	(United States) Scott Pruett	Patrick Racing	Lola T96/00	Ford	F	196	+4 Laps	0	1
13	7	4	(Italy) Alex Zanardi	Chip Ganassi Racing	Reynard 96I	Honda	F	195	+5 Laps	0	0
14	4	28	(United States) Bryan Herta	Team Rahal	Reynard 96I	Mercedes-Benz	G	195	+5 Laps	0	0
15	12	17	(Brazil) Maurício Gugelmin	PacWest Racing	Reynard 96I	Ford	G	194	+6 Laps	0	0
16	19	49	(United States) Parker Johnstone	Brix Comptech Racing	Reynard 96I	Honda	F	193	+7 Laps	0	0
17	10	5	(United States) Robby Gordon	Walker Racing	Reynard 96I	Ford	G	191	+9 Laps	0	0
18	22	25	(United States) Jeff Krosnoff	Arciero-Wells Racing	Reynard 96I	Toyota	F	191	+9 Laps	0	0
19	23	36	(Argentina) Juan Manuel Fangio II	All American Racers	Eagle Mk-V	Toyota	G	187	+13 Laps	0	0
20	25	10	(United States) Eddie Lawson	Galles Racing	Lola T96/00	Mercedes-Benz	G	184	+16 Laps	0	0
21	26	7	(Chile) Eliseo Salazar	Scandia-Simon Racing	Lola T96/00	Ford	G	184	+16 Laps	0	0
22	9	21	(United Kingdom) Mark Blundell	PacWest Racing	Reynard 96I	Ford	G	183	Suspension	0	0
23	24	22	(Mexico) Michel Jourdain Jr.	Scandia-Simon Racing	Lola T96/00	Ford	G	182	+18 Laps	0	0
24	27	98	(United States) P. J. Jones	All American Racers	Eagle Mk-V	Toyota	G	181	+19 Laps	0	0
25	21	34	(Brazil) Roberto Moreno	Payton-Coyne Racing	Lola T96/00	Ford	F	179	+21 Laps	0	0
26	8	1	(Brazil) Raul Boesel	Brahma Sports Team	Reynard 96I	Ford	G	128	Crash	0	0
27	20	16	(Sweden) Stefan Johansson	Bettenhausen Motorsports	Reynard 96I	Mercedes-Benz	G	78	Handling	0	0
28	28	19	(Japan) Hiro Matsushita	Payton-Coyne Racing	Lola T96/00	Ford	F	61	Exhaust	0	0

=== Race statistics ===
Lap Leaders
Laps	Leader
1–38	Paul Tracy
39–71	Michael Andretti
72–76	Paul Tracy
77–137	Al Unser Jr.
138–157	Michael Andretti
158–194	Al Unser Jr.
195–200	Michael Andretti

Cautions: 5 for 35 laps
Laps	Reason
1–4	Parker Johnstone spin turn 2
134–153	Raul Boesel crash turn 2
188–194	Mark Blundell brushed wall
197–199	Greg Moore spin turn 4
200	Parker Johnstone brushed wall turn 1

== Point Standings ==
After 7 of 16 races

1. Jimmy Vasser 95 points
2. Al Unser Jr. 75 points
3. Scott Pruett 51 points
4. Michael Andretti 51 points
5. Greg Moore 46 points
6. Paul Tracy 45 points
7. André Ribeiro 43 points
8. Christian Fittipaldi 41 points
9. Gil de Ferran 41 points
10. Bobby Rahal 32 points
