= 1996 IndyCar Rio 400 =

(Brazil) 1996 Rio 400
Race details
- Race 2 of 16 in the 1996 IndyCar season
- Date: March 17, 1996
- Official name: IndyCar Rio 400
- Location: Emerson Fittipaldi Speedway, Rio de Janeiro, Brazil
- Course: Permanent racing facility 1.864 mi / 3.000 km
- Distance: 133 laps 247.912 mi / 398.976 km

Pole position
- Driver: (Italy) Alex Zanardi (Target Chip Ganassi Racing)
- Time: 167.084 mph

Fastest lap
- Driver: (Brazil) Gil de Ferran (Jim Hall)
- Time: 167.3 mph (on lap of 133)

Podium
- First: (Brazil) André Ribeiro (Tasman Motorsports)
- Second: (United States) Al Unser Jr. (Penske Racing)
- Third: (United States) Scott Pruett (Patrick Racing)

The 1996 Rio 400 was a CART race at the Emerson Fittipaldi Speedway. It happened on March 17, 1996. It was the 2nd round of the 1996 IndyCar season.

== Starting grid ==
1. Alex Zanardi
2. Jimmy Vasser
3. André Ribeiro
4. Greg Moore
5. Parker Johnstone
6. Bobby Rahal
7. Gil de Ferran
8. Adrian Fernandez
9. Maurício Gugelmin
10. Scott Pruett
11. Robby Gordon
12. Al Unser Jr.
13. Emerson Fittipaldi
14. Roberto Moreno
15. Michael Andretti
16. Bryan Herta
17. Carlos Guerrero
18. Mark Blundell
19. Eddie Lawson
20. Hiro Matsushita
21. Stefan Johansson
22. Jeff Krosnoff
23. Marco Greco
24. Juan Manuel Fangio II
25. Paul Tracy
26. Raul Boesel
27. Christian Fittipaldi

=== Did not start ===
1. Scott Goodyear Wrecked during practice; sidelined for most of the season

== Race ==
On lap 11, Mark Blundell had a serious crash in turn 4, suffering a broken foot. The race continued under yellow caution flags until lap 23, with Alex Zanardi leading from Greg Moore and André Ribeiro. De Ferran ran out of fuel on lap 80. Moore had taken the lead, but retired with suspension problems on lap 115. Ribeiro eventually won from Al Unser Jr. and Scott Pruett.

== Box Score ==
Finish	Grid	No	Name	Team	Chassis	Engine	Tire	Laps	Time/Status	Led	Points
1	3	31	(Brazil) André Ribeiro	Tasman Motorsports	Lola T96/00	Honda	F	133	2:06:08.100	19	20
2	12	2	(United States) Al Unser Jr.	Marlboro Team Penske	Penske PC-25	Mercedes-Benz	G	133	+2.141	0	16
3	10	20	(United States) Scott Pruett	Patrick Racing	Lola T96/00	Ford	F	133	+2.732	0	14
4	1	4	(Italy) Alex Zanardi	Chip Ganassi Racing	Reynard 96I	Honda	F	133	+2.767	64	14
5	27	11	(Brazil) Christian Fittipaldi	Newman/Haas Racing	Lola T96/00	Ford	G	133	+3.540	0	10
6	6	18	(United States) Bobby Rahal	Team Rahal	Reynard 96I	Mercedes-Benz	G	133	+4.051	0	8
7	26	1	(Brazil) Raul Boesel	Brahma Sports Team	Reynard 96I	Ford	G	133	+5.110	0	6
8	2	12	(United States) Jimmy Vasser	Chip Ganassi Racing	Reynard 96I	Honda	F	132	+1 Lap	0	5
9	14	34	(Brazil) Roberto Moreno	Payton-Coyne Racing	Lola T96/00	Ford	F	132	+1 Lap	0	4
10	7	8	(Brazil) Gil de Ferran	Hall Racing	Reynard 96I	Honda	G	131	+2 Laps	20	3
11	13	9	(Brazil) Emerson Fittipaldi	Hogan-Penske Racing	Penske PC-25	Mercedes-Benz	G	131	+2 Laps	0	2
12	23	7	(Brazil) Marco Greco	Team Scandia	Lola T96/00	Ford	G	131	+2 Laps	0	1
13	16	28	(United States) Bryan Herta	Team Rahal	Reynard 96I	Mercedes-Benz	G	131	+2 Laps	0	0
14	8	32	(Mexico) Adrián Fernández	Tasman Motorsports	Lola T96/00	Honda	F	126	+7 Laps	0	0
15	11	5	(United States) Robby Gordon	Walker Racing	Reynard 96I	Ford	G	124	Crash	2	0
16	5	49	(United States) Parker Johnstone	Brix Comptech Racing	Reynard 96I	Honda	F	118	Fuel	0	0
17	24	36	(Argentina) Juan Manuel Fangio II	All American Racers	Eagle Mk-V	Toyota	G	118	+15 Laps	0	0
18	4	99	(Canada) Greg Moore	Forsythe Racing	Reynard 96I	Mercedes-Benz	F	116	Engine	28	0
19	25	3	(Canada) Paul Tracy	Marlboro Team Penske	Penske PC-25	Mercedes-Benz	G	102	Crash	0	0
20	17	22	(Mexico) Carlos Guerrero	Team Scandia	Lola T96/00	Ford	G	95	Engine	0	0
21	19	10	(United States) Eddie Lawson	Galles Racing	Lola T96/00	Mercedes-Benz	G	87	Drive line	0	0
22	15	6	(United States) Michael Andretti	Newman/Haas Racing	Lola T96/00	Ford	G	86	Engine	0	0
23	21	16	(Sweden) Stefan Johansson	Bettenhausen Motorsports	Reynard 96I	Mercedes-Benz	G	61	Cooling	0	0
24	20	19	(Japan) Hiro Matsushita	Payton-Coyne Racing	Lola T96/00	Ford	F	53	Header	0	0
25	9	17	(Brazil) Maurício Gugelmin	PacWest Racing	Reynard 96I	Ford	G	49	Suspension	0	0
26	22	25	(United States) Jeff Krosnoff	Arciero-Wells Racing	Reynard 96I	Toyota	F	37	Engine	0	0
27	18	21	(United Kingdom) Mark Blundell	PacWest Racing	Reynard 96I	Ford	G	10	Crash	0	0

=== Did not qualify ===
- (Canada) Scott Goodyear (#15) - withdrawn, injured in practice crash.

=== Race statistics ===
Lap Leaders
Laps	Leader
1–6	Alex Zanardi
7	André Ribeiro
8–60	Alex Zanardi
61–80	Gil de Ferran
81–97	Greg Moore
98–102	Alex Zanardi
103–104	Robby Gordon
105–115	Greg Moore
116–133	André Ribeiro

== Point standings ==
After 2 of 16 races

1. Scott Pruett 26 points
2. Jimmy Vasser 25 points
3. Al Unser Jr. 21 points
4. André Ribeiro 20 points
5. Gil de Ferran 19 points
6. Bobby Rahal 18 points
