= 1996 Molson Indy Toronto =

1996 CART race held at Toronto, Ontario, Canada

(Canada) 1996 Toronto
Race details
- Race 11 of 16 in the 1996 PPG Indy Car World Series season
- Date: July 14th, 1996
- Official name: 1996 Molson Indy Toronto
- Location: Exhibition Place, Toronto, Ontario, Canada
- Course: Toronto Street Circuit; 1.755 mi / 2.824 km
- Distance: 92 laps 164.312 mi / 264.408 km
- Scheduled Distance: 95 laps 169.67 mi / 273.03 km

Pole position
- Driver: (Brazil) André Ribeiro (Tasman Motorsports)
- Time: 0:58.06; 110.616 mph (178.0191959 kph)

Podium
- First: (Mexico) Adrián Fernández (Tasman Motorsports)
- Second: (Italy) Alex Zanardi (Chip Ganassi Racing)
- Third: (United States) Bobby Rahal (Team Rahal)

The 1996 Molson Indy Toronto was a CART race held on the street course at Toronto Street Circuit in Toronto, Ontario, Canada on July 14, 1996. The race was won by Adrian Fernandez, driving the #32 Lola/Honda for Tasman Motorsports (his first career win), but was marred by an accident late in the race which resulted in the deaths of rookie driver Jeff Krosnoff and a track worker.

== Qualifying ==
Twenty-eight drivers qualified for the race. The front row consisted of polesitter Andre Ribeiro, driving the #31 Lola/Honda for Tasman Motorsports, and Alex Zanardi, driving the #4 Honda for Chip Ganassi Racing.

Lineup

Pos	No.	Driver	Tires	Chassis	Engine	Team
1	31	(Brazil) André Ribeiro	Firestone	Lola	Honda	Tasman Motorsports
2	4	(Italy) Alex Zanardi	Firestone	Reynard	Honda	Chip Ganassi Racing
3	32	(Mexico) Adrián Fernández	Firestone	Lola	Honda	Tasman Motorsports
4	20	(United States) Scott Pruett	Firestone	Lola	Cosworth	Patrick Racing
5	99	(Canada) Greg Moore	Firestone	Reynard	Cosworth	Forsythe Racing
6	49	(United States) Parker Johnstone	Firestone	Reynard	Honda	Comptech Racing
7	2	(United States) Al Unser Jr.	Goodyear	Penske	Mercedes-Benz	Team Penske
8	18	(United States) Bobby Rahal	Goodyear	Reynard	Mercedes-Benz	Team Rahal
9	8	(Brazil) Gil de Ferran	Goodyear	Reynard	Honda	Jim Hall Racing
10	6	(United States) Michael Andretti	Goodyear	Lola	Cosworth	Newman/Haas Racing
11	12	(United States) Jimmy Vasser	Firestone	Reynard	Honda	Chip Ganassi Racing
12	28	(United States) Bryan Herta	Goodyear	Reynard	Mercedes-Benz	Team Rahal
13	3	(Canada) Paul Tracy	Goodyear	Penske	Mercedes-Benz	Team Penske
14	11	(Brazil) Christian Fittipaldi	Goodyear	Lola	Cosworth	Newman/Haas Racing
15	9	(Brazil) Emerson Fittipaldi	Goodyear	Penske	Mercedes-Benz	Hogan/Penske Racing
16	21	(United Kingdom) Mark Blundell	Goodyear	Reynard	Cosworth	PacWest Racing
17	17	(Brazil) Maurício Gugelmin	Goodyear	Reynard	Cosworth	PacWest Racing
18	5	(United States) Robby Gordon	Goodyear	Reynard	Cosworth	Walker Racing
19	1	(Brazil) Raul Boesel	Firestone	Reynard	Honda	Brahma Sports Team/Team Green
20	25	(United States) Jeff Krosnoff	Firestone	Reynard	Toyota	Arciero-Wells Racing
21	16	(Sweden) Stefan Johansson	Goodyear	Reynard	Mercedes-Benz	Bettenhausen Racing
22	34	(Brazil) Roberto Moreno	Goodyear	Lola	Cosworth	Payton/Coyne Racing
23	15	(Canada) Scott Goodyear	Goodyear	Reynard	Cosworth	Walker Racing
24	10	(United States) Eddie Lawson	Goodyear	Lola	Mercedes-Benz	Galles Racing
25	98	(United States) P. J. Jones	Goodyear	Eagle	Toyota	All American Racers
26	44	(United States) Richie Hearn	Goodyear	Lola	Cosworth	Della Penna Motorsports
27	36	(Argentina) Juan Manuel Fangio II	Goodyear	Eagle	Toyota	All American Racers
28	19	(Japan) Hiro Matsushita	Firestone	Lola	Cosworth	Payton/Coyne Racing

== Media coverage ==
ABC carried the race in the United States, with Paul Page as the race announcer and former open-wheel series regular Danny Sullivan as the color analyst, with Gary Gerould and Jack Arute as pit reporters.

In Canada, the race was carried live, flag-to-flag, on CBC with Brian Williams providing play-by-play and Bobby Unser as analyst. Jon Beekhuis and Ken Daniels served as pit reporters.

In Europe, the race was carried over Eurosport which utilized ABC's feed.

In Brazil, the race was carried live, flag-to-flag, on SBT with Teo José providing play-by-play and Dede Gomez as analyst. Luiz Carlos Azenha served as pit reporter.

== Race recap ==
Although Ribeiro started on pole, Zanardi (who went on to win the series Rookie of the Year award) quickly passed him and led the first lap. He stayed in front until lap 37 when Greg Moore took the point, but regained the lead two laps later and held until lap 65. Bobby Rahal led lap 66 and Adrian Fernandez took the lead on lap 67. Moore got back in front on lap 68 and led for ten laps until Fernandez once again moved to the front on lap 78.

== Fatal incident ==
On lap 91 of the scheduled 95-lap race, the accident that killed Krosnoff took place. With the field having been bunched up due to a restart a few laps prior, Krosnoff, Ribeiro, and Stefan Johansson were all multiple laps down at this point in the race but were still jockeying for position. Entering turn three of the track, the lapped car of Johansson tried to pass Gil de Ferran. Krosnoff was running next to Johansson and Ribeiro was ahead of all three of those cars.

As Johansson made his turn to pass de Ferran, he clipped Krosnoff's car and sent it flying into the catch fencing lining the side of the course. Krosnoff's car's chassis disintegrated on impact with a tree next to catchfence and split into two pieces. The cockpit of the car landed on the opposite side of the track while the rear wheels and engine rolled forward into the runoff area. When the dust finally settled, both Johansson and Ribeiro had come to rest in the runoff area along with Emerson Fittipaldi, who had been collected by Johansson's car and the remnants of Krosnoff's car, while de Ferran was able to limp around to complete his lap. As the IndyCar safety crew tried to attend to the accident scene, which was littered with debris from Krosnoff's car, Eddie Lawson came barreling toward the scene unaware of what had just taken place. CART officials frantically waved to Lawson to tell him to slow down, which he did just before he reached the scene, and he was able to continue on through the partially blocked track.

Shortly after this, CART officials threw a red flag along with the checkered flag, officially ending the race a few laps before its scheduled finish on lap 92. Krosnoff was removed from the wreck and transported to Toronto's Western Hospital where he was pronounced dead. Dr. Steve Olvey of the CART series and Dr. Hugh Scully of the race medical staff both spoke at the postrace press conference, where Olvey relayed the death was instantaneous and Scully reported that track worker Gary Arvin was also killed in the wreck as a result of being hit by Krosnoff's airborne car.

== Box score ==
Finish	Grid	No	Name	Team	Chassis	Engine	Tire	Laps^{1}	Time/Status	Led	Points
1	3	32	(Mexico) Adrián Fernández	Tasman Motorsports	Lola T96/00	Honda	F	93	1:41:59.809	17	20
2	2	4	(Italy) Alex Zanardi	Chip Ganassi Racing	Reynard 96I	Honda	F	93	+1.951	63	17
3	8	18	(United States) Bobby Rahal	Team Rahal	Reynard 96I	Mercedes-Benz	G	93	+3.570	1	14
4	5	99	(Canada) Greg Moore	Forsythe Racing	Reynard 96I	Mercedes-Benz	F	93	+4.326	12	12
5	13	3	(Canada) Paul Tracy	Marlboro Team Penske	Penske PC-25	Mercedes-Benz	G	93	+5.071	0	10
6	12	28	(United States) Bryan Herta	Team Rahal	Reynard 96I	Mercedes-Benz	G	93	+5.689	0	8
7	14	11	(Brazil) Christian Fittipaldi	Newman/Haas Racing	Lola T96/00	Ford	G	93	+7.313	0	6
8	11	12	(United States) Jimmy Vasser	Chip Ganassi Racing	Reynard 96I	Honda	F	93	+8.458	0	5
9	18	5	(United States) Robby Gordon	Walker Racing	Reynard 96I	Ford	G	93	+18.321	0	4
10	4	20	(United States) Scott Pruett	Patrick Racing	Lola T96/00	Ford	F	93	+19.652	0	3
11	16	21	(United Kingdom) Mark Blundell	PacWest Racing	Reynard 96I	Ford	G	92	+1 Lap	0	2
12	17	17	(Brazil) Maurício Gugelmin	PacWest Racing	Reynard 96I	Ford	G	92	+1 Lap	0	1
13	7	2	(United States) Al Unser Jr.	Marlboro Team Penske	Penske PC-25	Mercedes-Benz	G	92	+1 Lap	0	0
14	15	9	(Brazil) Emerson Fittipaldi	Hogan-Penske Racing	Penske PC-25	Mercedes-Benz	G	90	Crash	0	0
15	24	10	(United States) Eddie Lawson	Galles Racing	Lola T96/00	Mercedes-Benz	G	90	+3 Laps	0	0
16	20	25	(United States) Jeff Krosnoff	Arciero-Wells Racing	Reynard 96I	Toyota	F	89	Fatal crash	0	0
17	21	16	(Sweden) Stefan Johansson	Bettenhausen Mototsports	Reynard 96I	Mercedes-Benz	G	89	Crash	0	0
18	9	8	(Brazil) Gil de Ferran	Hall Racing	Reynard 96I	Honda	G	89	+4 Laps	0	0
19	23	15	(Canada) Scott Goodyear	Walker Racing	Reynard 96I	Ford	G	89	+4 Laps	0	0
20	25	98	(United States) P. J. Jones	All American Racers	Eagle Mk-V	Toyota	G	89	+4 Laps	0	0
21	1	31	(Brazil) André Ribeiro	Tasman Motorsports	Lola T96/00	Honda	F	88	Crash	0	1
22	10	6	(United States) Michael Andretti	Newman/Haas Racing	Lola T96/00	Ford	G	82	Engine	0	0
23	22	34	(Brazil) Roberto Moreno	Payton-Coyne Racing	Lola T96/00	Ford	F	52	Clutch	0	0
24	19	1	(Brazil) Raul Boesel	Brahma Sports Team	Reynard 96I	Ford	G	50	Electrical	0	0
25	26	44	(United States) Richie Hearn	Della Penna Motorsports	Reynard 95I	Ford	G	50	Fatigue	0	0
26	6	49	(United States) Parker Johnstone	Brix Comptech Racing	Reynard 96I	Honda	F	38	Suspension	0	0
27	28	19	(Japan) Hiro Matsushita	Payton-Coyne Racing	Lola T96/00	Ford	F	23	Water pump	0	0
28	27	36	(Argentina) Juan Manuel Fangio II	All American Racers	Eagle Mk-V	Toyota	G	10	Clutch	0	0

- ^{1} Race scheduled for 95 Laps, but ended two laps early due to Jeff Krosnoff's fatal accident.

=== Race statistics ===
Lap Leaders
Laps	Leader
1–36	Alex Zanardi
37–38	Greg Moore
39–65	Alex Zanardi
66	Bobby Rahal
67	Adrián Fernández
68–77	Greg Moore
78–93	Adrián Fernández

== Aftermath ==
Krosnoff's death was the second in American open-wheel racing series in 1996, after Indy Racing League driver Scott Brayton was killed in practice for that year's Indianapolis 500. It was also the last death in what eventually became the Champ Car World Series until 1999- coincidentally, that year also featured two deaths as Gonzalo Rodriguez was killed in a practice crash at Laguna Seca and Greg Moore was killed during the Marlboro 500 at California Speedway.
