= 1999 Marlboro 500 =

CART auto race at California Speedway

(United States) 1999 Marlboro 500 Presented by Toyota
Race details
- Race 20 of 20 in the 1999 CART season
- Track layout
- Date: October 31, 1999
- Official name: 1999 Marlboro 500 Presented by Toyota
- Location: Auto Club Speedway; Fontana, California
- Course: Oval; 2.029 mi / 3.23 km
- Distance: 250 laps 500 mi / 804.672 km
- Weather: Temperatures reaching up to 93.9 °F (34.4 °C); wind speeds approaching 11.1 miles per hour (17.9 km/h)

Pole position
- Driver: (United States) Scott Pruett (Arciero-Wells Racing)
- Time: 31.030 (235.398 MPH)

Fastest lap
- Driver: (Brazil) Christian Fittipaldi (Newman/Haas Racing)
- Time: 31.732 (230.190 MPH) (on lap 224 of 250)

Podium
- First: (Mexico) Adrian Fernandez (Patrick Racing)
- Second: (Italy) Max Papis (Team Rahal)
- Third: (Brazil) Christian Fittipaldi (Newman/Haas Racing)

The 1999 Marlboro 500 Presented by Toyota was held on October 31, 1999, at Auto Club Speedway (then known as California Speedway) in Fontana, California as the final showdown of the 1999 CART World Series season. The race was marred by an accident in the early stages of the race which killed Forsythe Racing driver Greg Moore.

The race was broadcast on ESPN with Paul Page doing play-by-play and Parker Johnstone as the color commentator. Gary Gerould and Jon Beekhuis were in the pits.

Adrian Fernandez, driving the Tecate/Quaker State Ford for Patrick Racing, won the race. It was his second victory of 1999 following his earlier victory at Twin Ring Motegi in Japan and the fifth of his career. It was also the second time that Fernandez won a race where another driver was killed; he won the 1996 Molson Indy Toronto street course event where Jeff Krosnoff and a track worker died.

== Background ==
=== Championship battle ===
The championship entering the race was still to be decided. The two contenders were Dario Franchitti, driver of the #27 Kool Cigarettes Reynard Honda for Team Green, and rookie Juan Pablo Montoya, driving the #4 Target Reynard Honda for Chip Ganassi Racing. Franchitti had just won the previous race at Surfers Paradise and held a nine-point lead in the season points standings over Montoya, who wrecked out and scored no points.

=== End of several eras ===
The season finale was also going to mark several significant lasts in CART, as significant upheaval was in the works for 2000.

Among the changes taking effect:

- Al Unser Jr., the two-time former Indianapolis 500 winner, was running his last race for Penske Racing, for which he had run since 1994. Both of Penske’s cars were going to be filled with new drivers for 2000, as the team signed Gil de Ferran and Greg Moore to take those positions. Unser would ultimately rejoin Galles Racing, for whom he won the 1992 Indianapolis 500, in the Indy Racing League for 2000.
- Scott Pruett was leaving to join his car owner Cal Wells' new team, PPI Motorsports, in NASCAR.
- Hogan Racing was one of several teams shutting their doors; this left its young driver Helio Castroneves without a ride.
- Goodyear would leave open-wheel racing altogether following the conclusion of the race weekend (both CART and the IRL would be finishing their seasons on the same weekend), citing the ongoing battle between both major series.

== Qualifying ==
Scott Pruett won the pole for the race, his 5th and final career pole in CART, his only one of the season, and also for the team. His fastest lap had an average speed of 235.398 miles per hour. The championship contenders Montoya qualified 3rd and Franchitti in 8th. Greg Moore was the only driver that did not make a qualifying run, thus starting at the rear of the field. Moore was not even certain to be in the race due to an accident in the paddock area the weekend before the race, where he was hit by a vehicle while riding his motor scooter. Moore suffered a broken hand in the incident and his team, Forsythe Racing, hired Roberto Moreno (who had served as replacement for both Christian Fittipaldi and Mark Blundell after both suffered injuries earlier in the season) as an emergency backup driver if Moore could not run the entire race. After a medical consultation, and an in-car test, he was allowed to race using a hand brace and had the pain dulled with an injection of medicine.

== Qualification Results ==
- The championship contenders are in **bold**

St	Car	Driver	Time	Speed (mph)
1	24	(United States) Scott Pruett	31.030	235.398
2	7	(Italy) Max Papis	31.143	234.544
3	4	(Colombia) **Juan Pablo Montoya**	31.182	234.251
4	12	(United States) Jimmy Vasser	31.207	234.063
5	8	(United States) Bryan Herta	31.227	233.913
6	6	(United States) Michael Andretti	31.315	233.256
7	33	(Canada) Patrick Carpentier	31.319	233.226
8	27	(United Kingdom) **Dario Franchitti**	31.326	233.174
9	11	(Brazil) Christian Fittipaldi	31.351	232.988
10	2	(United States) Al Unser Jr.	31.363	232.899
11	44	(Brazil) Tony Kanaan	31.371	232.839
12	5	(Brazil) Gil de Ferran	31.388	232.713
13	40	(Mexico) Adrian Fernandez	31.412	232.535
14	3	(United States) Alex Barron	31.429	232.410
15	22	(United States) Robby Gordon	31.432	232.387
16	25	(Brazil) Cristiano da Matta	31.435	232.365
17	17	(Brazil) Maurício Gugelmin	31.462	232.166
18	18	(United Kingdom) Mark Blundell	31.500	231.886
19	26	(Canada) Paul Tracy	31.612	231.064
20	9	(Brazil) Hélio Castroneves	31.635	230.896
21	10	(United States) Richie Hearn	31.713	230.328
22	15	(Japan) Naoki Hattori	31.831	229.474
23	20	(United States) P. J. Jones	31.385	229.446
24	34	(United States) Dennis Vitolo	32.020	228.120
25	36	(Brazil) Raul Boesel	32.159	227.134
26	19	(Mexico) Michel Jourdain Jr.	32.250	226.493
27	99	(Canada) Greg Moore	No Time	No Speed

== Race highlights ==
Pruett led the way in his final CART appearance, but he would not hold the lead for long as he dropped back and fell out of the race later on, while Michael Andretti took control at the start. Two laps later, Richie Hearn, in his final CART race, spun at turn 2 and struck the inside wall; he would walk away. Alex Barron crashed out of the event on the 27th lap; that was the final accident of the event. After leading all but nine of the first seventy-one laps, Andretti's car suffered a fire during his second pit stop, which dropped him out of contention. Dario Franchitti, who was in a championship battle with Juan Pablo Montoya, also had difficulties on pit road; he fell off the pace when his first pit stop led to an improperly fitted right rear wheel, and the replacement tires had incorrect pressure. Raul Boesel, who was running his 3rd race of the season, fell out with an engine blown as he completed 164 laps, this race turned out to be his last of his 173 starts, leaving him with the most starts to never win a CART race. Max Papis led for 111 laps but was forced to make a pit stop near the end for fuel. Adrián Fernández would take the lead and held him off to get the win after successfully stretching his fuel supply to avoid a late pit stop. Fernandez finished the race approximately seven seconds in front of Papis.

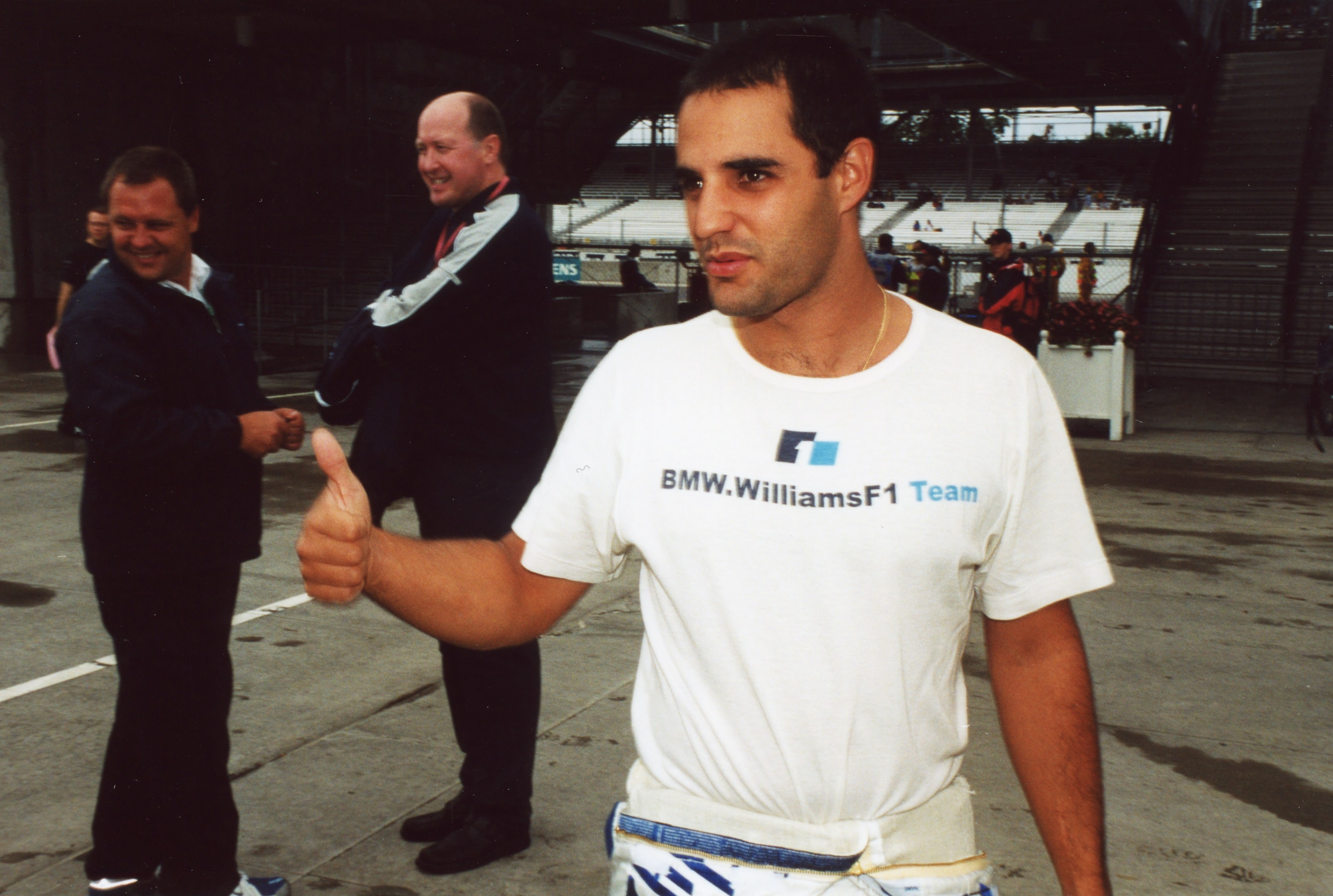
Montoya won the CART World Series championship after winning the tiebreaker from Franchitti, due to his number of wins (Picture shown from 2002).

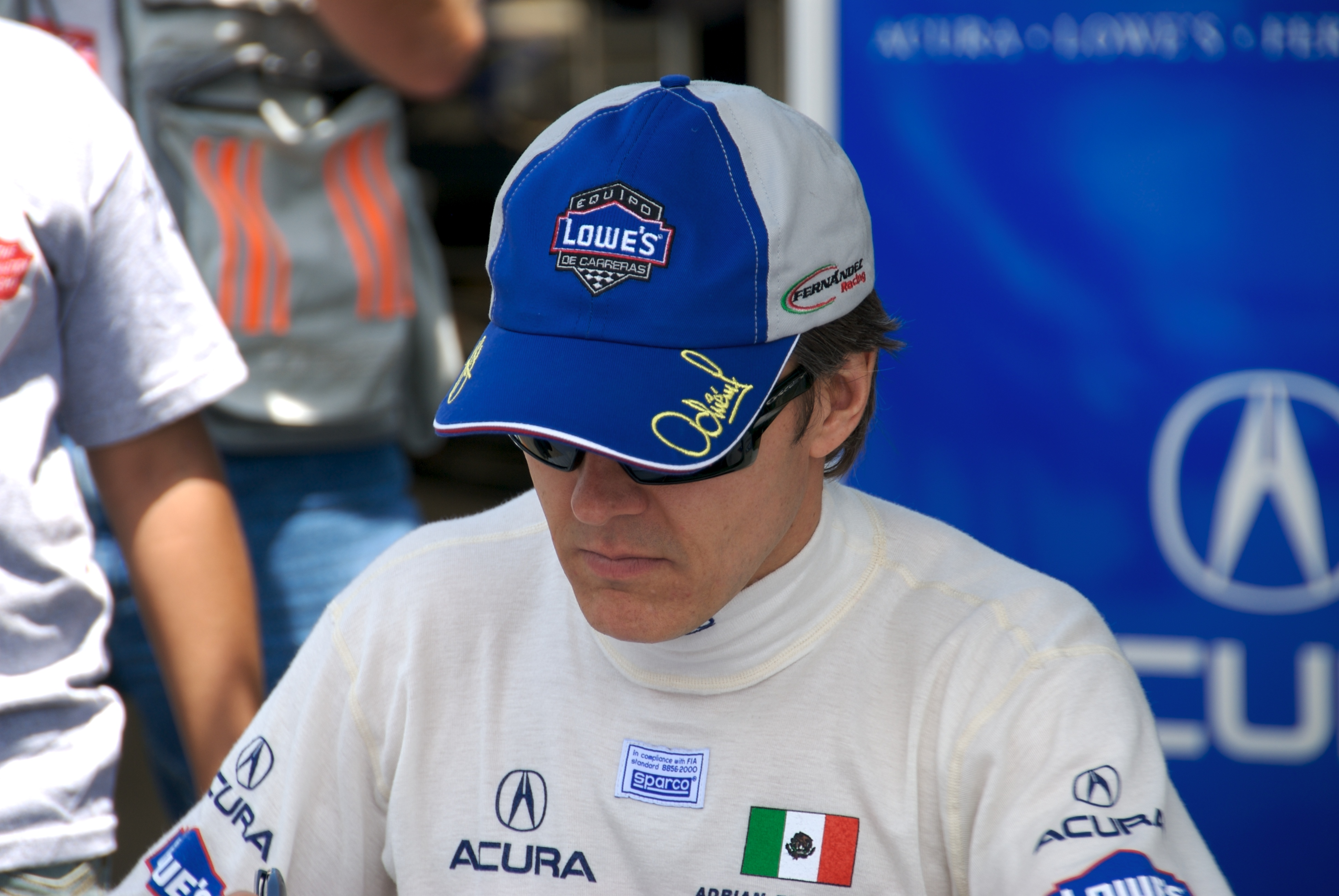
Adrián Fernández won the final race of the year, but for the second time a fatal accident marred an event which he won.

Juan Pablo Montoya and Franchitti ended up in a tie with 212 points. Franchitti had scored more podiums but Montoya won the title by having the most wins with seven to Franchitti's three. The championship was also Chip Ganassi Racing's fourth straight title with three drivers (also including Jimmy Vasser in 1996 and Alex Zanardi in 1997–1998.

== Death of Greg Moore ==
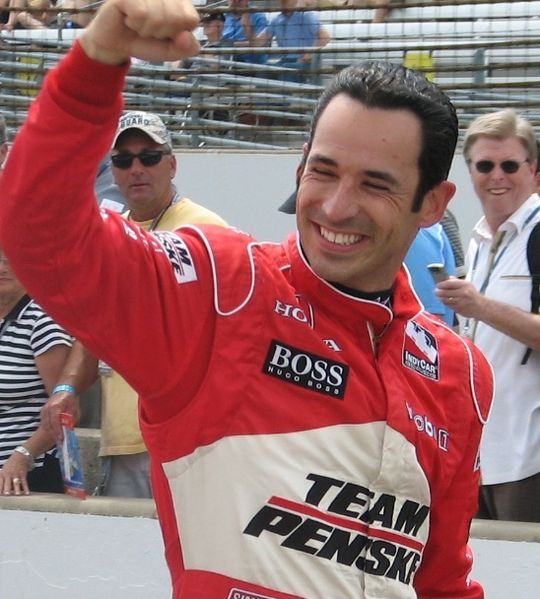
Hélio Castroneves, seen here in 2009, finished 20th in the race. Castroneves began driving for Team Penske the following season, taking the deceased Moore's place, and remained with the team for the next 20 years.

On lap 9, Greg Moore lost control of his car in almost the same area where Richie Hearn had earlier. Hearn was able to slow down significantly as his car came to rest in the backstretch grass near a retaining wall.

Moore's accident, however, was much worse. As he was spinning out, he clipped the edge of the grass on the backstretch. This caused the #99 to be propelled at a high rate of speed toward the retaining wall, striking it at an angle where the cockpit hit first. The violent impact destroyed the car instantly, with what was left of it tumbling down the grass until it landed approximately halfway down the backstretch, upside down.

The track safety crew was on the scene almost immediately along with CART series medical director Steve Olvey and an ambulance. Moore was extricated from the remains of the #99 and Olvey called for an airlift. A Medevac helicopter with Loma Linda University Medical Center trauma surgeon Jeff Grange was dispatched to Fontana, and Moore was placed on the helicopter and flown back with Grange who gave periodic reports to Olvey while en route.

The first major update on the ongoing situation was given by Olvey to Gary Gerould of ESPN as Lap 42 of the race was beginning. Olvey stated that the accident had resulted in Moore suffering a series of massive injuries to his body and was in significant danger of losing his life. He also said he was waiting for further updates from Grange, his colleague, at Loma Linda and would hear from him again shortly.

At 1:20 PM Pacific, doctors at the hospital pronounced Moore dead from his injuries. He was 24 years old, and was the second driver to die in the season; Penske Racing driver Gonzalo Rodríguez had been killed in a practice crash at Laguna Seca Raceway just three races earlier. Word of Moore's death eventually reached Fontana and Olvey, who at 2:07 PM Pacific relayed the news of Moore's death to Gerould and the worldwide television audience.

Upon the announcement, CART steward Wally Dallenbach Sr. instructed track officials to lower the flags flying in the winner's circle (the American flag, the California state flag, and the CART logo flag) to half staff. The race was not stopped, as series officials decided the best way to deal with the situation was to run the race to its conclusion. It was also decided to withhold the information about Moore from the drivers until after the event concluded.

Once the checkered flag fell and all of the drivers completed the final lap, CART ordered all of the cars to return to their pit stalls immediately. It was there that they all learned of Moore's death, and many of them were shaken by the news. There was no postrace celebration for either Fernandez or Montoya.

After the race, ESPN attempted to get interviews with both the series champion and the race winner. An emotional Gary Gerould talked to Montoya and his team owner Chip Ganassi, who with Montoya's title had won a fourth consecutive series title; both men relayed their condolences to Moore's family and gave more muted statements on their accomplishments. Once Fernandez climbed from his car and heard the news, Jon Beekhuis reported that he broke down in tears almost immediately and was not willing to speak to anyone; Fernandez did eventually grant an interview in the post race press conference but was still in significant emotional distress. Some of the drivers and teams gathered in a room in the infield facilities for a prayer, and a service was conducted by one of the series chaplains on pit road for the fans in attendance, many of which chose to stay after the race concluded.

An investigation of the fatal crash said the fatal head injury was caused because the car had flown into the wall with Moore's head smashing into the barrier first at a specific angle. The investigation confirmed that had the car hit the wall differently than Moore's head hitting the wall first, he would have survived. International Speedway Corporation would later pave over the area where Moore initially spun into and eventually pave over the entire backstretch.

As previously mentioned, Moore was leaving Forsythe Racing to take over Penske Racing's other car, which had been driven by a rotating roster of drivers; he was to pair with Gil de Ferran, who was leaving Walker Racing to take over Al Unser Jr.’s car. Moore's death opened the door for Helio Castroneves, who as mentioned was driving for the soon-to-be-defunct Hogan Racing in the Marlboro 500; he would join Penske in place of Moore and drive for the team until 2020.

== Legacy ==
Moore would end up finishing in 10th in the final points standings but soon after his death, the number 99 would be retired by CART in honor of him. Fellow drivers paid tribute to this day, including Dario Franchitti who was one of Moore's best friends when he won at Vancouver in 2002. Franchitti did so again when he won the 2009 IndyCar Series title and the season finale at Homestead-Miami Speedway, where Moore won his final CART victory in the same year of his death. Max Papis to this day still wears red gloves in honor of Moore who wore red gloves during his career.

== Race results ==
Pos	St	Car	Driver	Team	Laps	Led	Margin/Retired	Status	Points
1	13	40	(Mexico) Adrian Fernandez	Patrick Racing	250	10	2hr 57min 17sec 171.666 mph	Running	20
2	2	7	(Italy) Max Papis	Team Rahal	250	112	+7.634 sec	Running	17
3	9	11	(Brazil) Christian Fittipaldi	Newman/Haas Racing	250	37	+8.843 sec	Running	14
4	3	4	(Colombia) Juan Pablo Montoya	Chip Ganassi Racing	250	13	+14.316 sec	Running	12
5	4	12	(United States) Jimmy Vasser	Chip Ganassi Racing	250	0	+20.706 sec	Running	10
6	17	17	(Brazil) Maurício Gugelmin	PacWest	250	2	+44.196 sec	Running	8
7	10	2	(United States) Al Unser Jr.	Team Penske	249	0	+1 lap	Flagged	6
8	11	44	(Brazil) Tony Kanaan	Forsythe Racing	249	0	+1 lap	Flagged	5
9	12	5	(Brazil) Gil de Ferran	Walker Racing	249	0	+1 lap	Flagged	4
10	8	27	(United Kingdom) Dario Franchitti	Team Green	248	0	+2 laps	Flagged	3
11	15	22	(United States) Robby Gordon	Team Gordon	247	0	+3 laps	Flagged	2
12	23	20	(United States) P. J. Jones	Patrick Racing	246	0	+4 laps	Flagged	1
13	26	19	(Mexico) Michel Jourdain Jr.	Dale Coyne Racing	236	5	Engine	OUT	
14	5	8	(United States) Bryan Herta	Team Rahal	235	0	+15 laps	Flagged	
15	24	34	(United States) Dennis Vitolo	Dale Coyne Racing	235	0	+15 laps	Flagged	
16	18	18	(United Kingdom) Mark Blundell	PacWest	193	0	Electrical	OUT	
17	25	36	(Brazil) Raul Boesel	All American Racing	164	0	Engine	OUT	
18	19	26	(Canada) Paul Tracy	Team Green	141	9	Electrical	OUT	
19	22	15	(Japan) Naoki Hattori	Walker Racing	124	0	Electrical	OUT	
20	19	9	(Brazil) Hélio Castroneves	Hogan Racing	111	0	Engine	OUT	
21	6	6	(United States) Michael Andretti	Newman/Haas Racing	71	62	Oil fire	OUT	
22	1	24	(United States) Scott Pruett	Arciero-Wells Racing	48	0	Engine	OUT	1‡
23	16	25	(Brazil) Cristiano da Matta	Arciero-Wells Racing	32	0	Engine	OUT	
24	14	3	(United States) Alex Barron	Team Penske	27	0	Crash	OUT	
25	7	33	(Canada) Patrick Carpentier	Forsythe Racing	21	0	Electrical	OUT	
26	27	99	(Canada) Greg Moore	Forsythe Racing	9	0	Crash (Fatal)	OUT	
27	21	10	(United States) Richie Hearn	Della Penna Motorsports	3	0	Crash	OUT	

- ‡ - Denotes Pole Sitter and earns one point

== Final standings ==
Juan Pablo Montoya and Dario Franchitti ended up tied with 212 points each, Montoya winning the tiebreaker due to his higher number of wins that season with seven. This rare occurrence would happen again in IndyCar in 2006 as another Ganassi Racing driver, Dan Wheldon, and Penske Racing's Sam Hornish Jr. had 475 points each and Hornish Jr. won the tiebreaker with the most wins at the end. In 2015, Montoya (driving for Penske) would lose the IndyCar championship in a tiebreaker to his former team with Scott Dixon clinching his fourth title after winning at Sonoma Raceway to earn a series-leading third win of the season. This also happened previously in the 1996 Indy Racing League season, when Buzz Calkins and Scott Sharp were tied with 246 points. But on that occasion, they were co-champions and only held three events. The NASCAR Cup Series has only had this scenario play out once, in 2011 when Tony Stewart and Carl Edwards were tied in points (2403) but Stewart won that championship due to 5 race wins, all in the ten-race 'Chase' that makes up the season's final 10 races, compared to Edwards' 1 victory at Las Vegas the third race into the season.

Pos	Driver	Points
1	(Colombia) Juan Pablo Montoya	212
2	(United Kingdom) Dario Franchitti	212
3	(Canada) Paul Tracy	161
4	(United States) Michael Andretti	151
5	(Italy) Max Papis	150
6	(Mexico) Adrian Fernandez	140
7	(Brazil) Christian Fittipaldi	121
8	(Brazil) Gil de Ferran	108
9	(United States) Jimmy Vasser	104
10	(Canada) Greg Moore	97

Previous race: 1999 Honda Indy 300	CART FedEx Championship Series; 1999 season	Next race: 2000 Marlboro Grand Prix of Miami presented by Toyota
Previous race: 1998 Marlboro 500 Presented by Toyota	Marlboro 500	Next race: 2000 Marlboro 500
