= Penske PC-25 =

- Category: CART IndyCar
- Constructor: Penske.
- Designer: Nigel Bennett
- Predecessor: Penske PC-24
- Successor: Penske PC-26

Technical specifications
- Chassis: Carbon-fiber monocoque
- Length: 4,973 mm (196 in)
- Axle track: Front: 1,730 mm (68 in); Rear: 1,630 mm (64 in)
- Wheelbase: 2,972 mm (117 in)
- Engine: Mercedes-Benz IC 108C 2.65 L (2,650 cc; 162 cu in) V8, vee angle 72 degrees, 4 valves per cylinder, DOHC single turbocharged Mid-engined, longitudinally mounted
- Transmission: 6-speed sequential manual
- Weight: 703 kg (1,550 lb)
- Fuel: Methanol supplied by 76
- Lubricants: Mobil 1
- Tyres: Goodyear Eagle Speedway Special Radial 25.5in x 9.5in x 15in (front); 27in x 14.5in x 15in (rear)

Competition history
- Notable entrants: Marlboro Team Penske; Hogan Penske Racing
- Notable drivers: (Canada) Paul Tracy (United States) Al Unser Jr. (Brazil) Emerson Fittipaldi (Denmark) Jan Magnussen
- Debut: 1996 Grand Prix of Miami
| Races | Wins | Poles | F/Laps |
|---|---|---|---|
| 16 | 0 | 3 | 2 |
- Teams' Championships: 0
- Constructors' Championships: 0
- Drivers' Championships: 0

The Penske PC-25 was an open-wheel CART racing car that competed in the 1996 IndyCar season with Marlboro Team Penske and Hogan Penske Racing. It was designed by Nigel Bennett.

== Development ==
Roger Penske made several changes for 1996, particularly after the Penske team failed to qualify for the 1995 Indianapolis 500. Some of the differences between the PC-25 and the 1995 car, the Penske PC-24, were that it had better aerodynamics and was powered by the Mercedes-Benz IC 108C turbocharged V8 engine producing 900 brake horsepower. The biggest problem to sort out for 1996 was the drivers; American Al Unser Jr. stayed with Penske but Canadian Paul Tracy rejoined the team and the team gave a PC-25 to Hogan Racing for Brazilian Emerson Fittipaldi to drive and that team was known as Hogan-Penske Racing.

== Racing History ==
=== Marlboro Team Penske ===
The PC-25 made its debut at the first race of the 1996 season, the Marlboro Grand Prix of Miami Presented by Toyota saw Unser Jr finish eighth despite losing his front wing after hitting Carlos Guerrero and Tracy jumped the start but retired with a broken transmission. At the IndyCar Rio 400 the American finished second and the Canadian retired when he crashed into Marco Greco, The Bartercard Indycar Australia saw Unser Jr finish ninth and Tracy retired when he crashed. At the Toyota Grand Prix of Long Beach The American finish third and the Canadian finish fourth, The Bosch Spark Plug Grand Prix saw Unser Jr finish fourth and Tracy finish fifth despite colliding with three Penske mechanics in one move after stopping his car in his pit area. The mechanics were not badly injured, but were taken to the hospital. Then Tracy received a black flag penalty because of the incident with his mechanics. At the U.S. 500 The Canadian finished seventh and the American eighth, The Miller Genuine Draft 200 saw Unser Jr second and Tracy third. Both Penske drivers had a collision at the ITT Automotive Detroit Grand Prix, The American retired but the Canadian continued and then crashed very hard but continued the race and finished 17th. The Texaco/Havoline Presents Budweiser/G. I. Joe's 200 saw Unser Jr finish fourth and Tracy retired with broken suspension, At the Medic Drug Grand Prix of Cleveland the American finish fourth and the Canadian finished ninth. The Molson Indy Toronto saw Unser Jr 13th and Tracy fifth, The Canadian crashed and injured his back injury during practice for the Marlboro 500 and did not start the race and the American finished fourth. Tracy was replaced by Danishman Jan Magnussen for the Miller 200 and finished 14th and Unser Jr retired when he crashed with two laps to the finish, Tracy returned with a heeled back for the Texaco/Havoline 200 and the Canadian finish 12th and the American retired with engine failure on the final lap. The Molson Indy Vancouver saw Unser Jr fifth and Tracy retired when he crashed. The final round of the 1996 season was the Toyota Grand Prix of Monterey Featuring the Bank of America 300 saw the American finish 16th and the Canadian retire when he crashed.

After the season finished, Penske was in an unusual situation for 1996. Penske did not win a CART race, The combination of the PC-25 with the Mercedes-Benz IC 108C engine and the Goodyear Tire and Rubber Company had nothing to challenge the Reynard 96I with the Honda HRH engine and the Firestone Tire and Rubber Company. Penske boss Roger Penske choose to continue with their own car in the 1997 CART season with the Penske PC-26.

=== Hogan Penske Racing ===
The PC-27 made its debut at the first race of the 1996 season, the Marlboro Grand Prix of Miami Presented by Toyota and Fittipaldi finished 13th. The Brazilian finished 11th at the IndyCar Rio 400. Fitipaldi retired from the next two races, Engine failure at the Bartercard Indycar Australia and hit some debris from a collision by Greg Moore and Emerson's nephew Christian Fittipaldi, It damaged the suspension and crashed at the Toyota Grand Prix of Long Beach. The Brazilian finish fourth at the Bosch Spark Plug Grand Prix, Fittipaldi finish tenth at the U.S. 500. The Brazilian finish fourth at the Miller Genuine Draft 200. Fitipaldi retired from the next five races, Crashed at the ITT Automotive Detroit Grand Prix, Broken transmission at the Texaco/Havoline Presents Budweiser/G. I. Joe's 200, Engine failure at the Medic Drug Grand Prix of Cleveland, Crashed at the Molson Indy Toronto and got injured in a crash at the Marlboro 500 ended his CART career. The team skipped the Miller 200 and then hired Danishman Jan Magnussen for the remainder of the season but retired at the next two races, Crashed at the Texaco/Havoline 200 and the car caught on fire at Molson Indy Vancouver. The final round of the 1996 season was the Toyota Grand Prix of Monterey Featuring the Bank of America 300 and the Danishman finish eighth. At the end of the year Hogan Racing boss Carl Hogan choose to enter the Reynard 97I for his team in 1997.

== Complete Indy Car World Series results ==
(key) (Results in bold indicate pole position; results in italics indicate fastest lap)

| Year | Entrant | Engine | Tyres | Driver | No. | 1 | 2 | 3 | 4 | 5 | 6 | 7 | 8 | 9 | 10 | 11 | 12 | 13 | 14 | 15 | 16 | Points | D.C. |
|---|---|---|---|---|---|---|---|---|---|---|---|---|---|---|---|---|---|---|---|---|---|---|---|
| 1996 | Marlboro Team Penske | Mercedes-Benz IC 108C V8t | G | | | MIA | RIO | SFR | LBH | NAZ | 500 | MIL | DET | POR | CLE | TOR | MCH | MDO | ROA | VAN | LAG | | |
| 1996 | Marlboro Team Penske | Mercedes-Benz IC 108C V8t | G | (United States) Al Unser Jr. | 2 | 8 | 2 | 9 | 3 | 3 | 8 | 2 | 22 | 4 | 4 | 13 | 4 | 13 | 10 | 5 | 16 | **4th** | **125** |
| 1996 | Marlboro Team Penske | Mercedes-Benz IC 108C V8t | G | (Canada) Paul Tracy | 3 | **23** | 19 | 22 | 4 | **5** | 7 | **3** | 17 | 27 | 9 | 5 | DNS | | 12 | 18 | 29 | **13th** | **60** |
| 1996 | Marlboro Team Penske | Mercedes-Benz IC 108C V8t | G | (Denmark) Jan Magnussen | 3 | | | | | | | | | | | | | 14 | | | | **24th** | **5** |
| 1996 | Hogan Penske Racing | Mercedes-Benz IC 108C V8t | G | (Denmark) Jan Magnussen | 9 | | | | | | | | | | | | | | 26 | 22 | 8 | **24th** | **5** |
| 1996 | Hogan Penske Racing | Mercedes-Benz IC 108C V8t | G | (Brazil) Emerson Fittipaldi | 9 | 13 | 11 | 25 | 20 | 4 | 10 | 4 | 25 | 20 | 22 | 14 | 25 | | | | | **19th** | **29** |
