= Penske PC-24 =

Racing car

- Category: CART IndyCar
- Constructor: Penske.
- Designer: Nigel Bennett
- Predecessor: Penske PC-23
- Successor: Penske PC-25

Technical specifications
- Chassis: Carbon-fiber monocoque
- Length: 4,973 in (126,314 mm)
- Axle track: Front: 1,730 in (43,942 mm); Rear: 1,630 in (41,402 mm)
- Wheelbase: 2,972 in (75,489 mm)
- Engine: Mercedes-Benz IC 108C 2.65 L (2,650 cc; 162 cu in) V8, vee angle 72 degrees, 4 valves per cylinder, DOHC single-turbocharged Mid-engined, longitudinally mounted
- Transmission: 6-speed sequential manual
- Weight: 703 kg (1,550 lb)
- Fuel: Methanol supplied by 76
- Lubricants: Mobil 1
- Tyres: Goodyear Eagle Speedway Special Radial 25.5in x 9.5in x 15in (front); 27in x 14.5in x 15in (rear)

Competition history
- Notable entrants: Marlboro Team Penske
- Notable drivers: (United States) Al Unser Jr. (Brazil) Emerson Fittipaldi
- Debut: 1995 Grand Prix of Miami
Races	Wins
17	5
- Teams' Championships: 0
- Constructors' Championships: 0
- Drivers' Championships: 0

The Penske PC-24 was an open-wheel CART racing car that competed in the 1995 IndyCar season, fielded exclusively by Marlboro Team Penske. It was designed by Nigel Bennett. It scored a total of 5 wins that season; 4 wins for Al Unser Jr., and 1 win for Emerson Fittipaldi. However, the chassis notably failed to qualify for the 1995 Indianapolis 500, with both Unser Jr. and Fittipaldi struggling to find pace on the high-speed oval circuit. It was powered by the 2.65 L (162 cu in), 800 hp (600 kW), Ilmor-designed and developed Mercedes-Benz IC108 engine.
