= Hogan Racing =

American car racing team

Hogan Racing was a racing team owned by Carl G. Hogan, owner of Hogan Trucking.

== Sports cars ==
Hogan Racing began in the early 1970s racing in the Formula 5000 series out of a shop in Lime Rock, Connecticut across the street from Lime Rock Park. It moved to St. Louis, Missouri in 1973. The team began racing full-time in the Formula 5000 Can-Am series in 1974 with David Hobbs with its own car for the series. The car was later driven by Al Holbert. However, as the 1980s dawned Hogan drifted away from the sport, only to return at the end of the decade when Hogan began working with Chip Ganassi.

== CART Champ Car ==
=== Partnerships with Rahal and Penske ===
The team joined the world of open-wheel racing in December 1991 as Hogan and Bobby Rahal purchased the distressed Patrick Racing CART IndyCar World Series team. The team won the championship in its first try in 1992 with driver Bobby Rahal on the back of four race wins. In late 1992 the team absorbed TrueSports and moved into TrueSports' facility in Ohio and began using TrueSports' proprietary chassis in 1993. However this proved disastrous as Rahal and teammate Mike Groff both failed to qualify for the 1993 Indianapolis 500 in the car. Rahal switched to a Lola chassis for the next race while Groff soldiered on with the RH01 until August.

In 1994, the team was the first to sign on with new engine manufacturer Honda. The team again struggled at Indianapolis and Rahal borrowed cars from Team Penske to get himself and Groff into the field. Rahal finished 3rd and Groff crashed 28 laps into the race.

In 1996, Rahal and Hogan split and Hogan formed Hogan Racing and Rahal led Team Rahal. For 1996 Hogan partnered with Penske Racing to field Emerson Fittipaldi's entry. Fittipaldi was injured in a crash at the Michigan International Speedway and retired from the sport and Jan Magnussen replaced him for the rest of the season. Fittipaldi finished 19th in points and Magnussen 24th in their partial seasons.

=== Independent team ===
For 1997 Hogan went off on his own and signed rookie Dario Franchitti and selected Reynard chassis with Mercedes-Benz-Ilmor power. Franchitti finished 22nd in points with a best finish of 9th and signed with Team KOOL Green before the season's end, prompting Hogan to bench Franchitti and put Robby Gordon in his car for the final race of the season at California Speedway. For 1998 Hogan signed ex-F1 driver JJ Lehto. Lehto, despite his credentials, only managed 20th in points with a best finish of fifth at Surfers Paradise. 1999 brought in second-year driver Hélio Castroneves full-time and pay driver Luiz Garcia Jr. for a handful of late-season road races. Castroneves finished second at Gateway International Raceway and won the pole the following week at the Milwaukee Mile as the highlights of a season where he finished 15th in points. Hogan signed Castroneves under the condition that Castroneves' management team led by Emerson Fittipaldi would generate $3 Million USD in sponsorship for the team. However, the sponsorship did not materialize and Castroneves and Hogan began to be forced to pay for operations out-of-pocket. Due to the mounting losses and little prospects for sponsorship, Hogan decided to shut the team down at the end of the season.

Carl Hogan died in January 2001 at the age of 71

=== Drivers ===
- (Brazil) Emerson Fittipaldi (1996; partnered with Team Penske)
- (Denmark) Jan Magnussen (1996; replaced Fittipaldi after Michigan crash)
- (United Kingdom) Dario Franchitti (1997)
- (United States) Robby Gordon (1997; replaced Franchitti after Franchitti signed contract with Team KOOL Green)
- (Finland) JJ Lehto (1998)
- (Brazil) Hélio Castroneves (1999)
- (Brazil) Luiz Garcia Jr. (1999)

== Racing results ==
=== Complete CART FedEx Championship Series results ===
(key) (results in bold indicate pole position) (results in italics indicate fastest lap)

Year	Chassis	Engine	Tyres	Drivers	No.	1	2	3	4	5	6	7	8	9	10	11	12	13	14	15	16	17	18	19	20	Pts Pos	Pts
1996						MIA	RIO	SFR	LBH	NAZ	500	MIL	DET	POR	CLE	TOR	MCH	MDO	ROA	VAN	LAG						
1996	Penske PC-25	Mercedes-Benz IC108C V8t	G	(Brazil) Emerson Fittipaldi	9	13	11	25	20	4	10	4	25	20	22	14	25									19th	29
1996	Penske PC-25	Mercedes-Benz IC108C V8t	G	(Denmark) Jan Magnussen	9														26	22	8					24th	5
1997						MIA	SFR	LBH	NAZ	RIO	GAT	MIL	DET	POR	CLE	TOR	MCH	MDO	ROA	VAN	LAG	FON					
1997	Reynard 97i	Mercedes-Benz IC108D V8t	F	(United Kingdom) Dario Franchitti	9	25	9	12	13	27	17	16	13	26	11	**26**	19	11	25	13	13					22nd	10
1997	Reynard 97i	Mercedes-Benz IC108D V8t	F	(United States) Robby Gordon	9																	8				26th	5
1998						MIA	MOT	LBH	NAZ	RIO	GAT	MIL	DET	POR	CLE	TOR	MCH	MDO	ROA	VAN	LAG	HOU	SFR	FON			
1998	Reynard 98i	Mercedes-Benz IC108E V8t	F	(Finland) JJ Lehto	9	14	29	18	16	10	9	19	26	25	28	24	20	15	18	8	28	10	5	21		20th	25
1999						MIA	MOT	LBH	NAZ	RIO	GAT	MIL	POR	CLE	ROA	TOR	MCH	DET	MDO	CHI	VAN	LAG	HOU	SRF	FON		
1999	Lola B99/00	Mercedes-Benz IC108E V8t	F	(Brazil) Hélio Castroneves	9	17	9	19	21	25	2	**26**	26	26	16	27	25	7	7	5	8	26	26	21	20	15th	48
1999	Lola B99/00	Mercedes-Benz IC108E V8t	F	(Brazil) Luiz Garcia Jr.	21														24	DNS	16	15	DNS			34th	0
