= PacWest Racing =

Champ Car racing team

- Owner(s): Bruce McCaw
- Principal(s): {{{principals}}}

Career
- Debut: 1993 Australian FAI IndyCar Grand Prix
- Latest race: 2002 Miller Lite 250
- Drivers' Championships: 0
- Indy 500 victories: 0
- Race victories: 5
- Pole positions: 3

PacWest Racing was a Champ Car racing team owned by Bruce McCaw founded in 1993.

== History ==
The team's first full-time season was in 1994, with drivers Dominic Dobson and future Indy Racing League co-champion Scott Sharp. In 1995, the team switched to former Formula One driver Maurício Gugelmin and a fading Danny Sullivan, who would be replaced late in the season by Juan Manuel Fangio II after an injury. In 1996, Mark Blundell took over Fangio's seat.

1997 became PacWest's breakout year, with the team taking four wins - three from Blundell and Gugelmin's sole CART victory at Vancouver. The team was since considered a major team, and was figured to be in contention for the championship in 1998.

The next three years, however, turned out to be a disappointment. 2001 saw Blundell, who retired after the previous season's end, replaced with 2000 Indy Lights Champion Scott Dixon, who earned PacWest's final victory at Nazareth, in which Dixon's teammate Gugelmin withdrew after the death of his son.

2002 was PacWest's final year, in which the troubled team could only obtain associate sponsorship from NTN. The team started four races with Dixon and Oriol Servia. After the third race, Dixon left the team to join Chip Ganassi Racing, and Servia started one more race before McCaw closed the organization.

The team was purchased by Kevin Kalkhoven and Craig Pollock to form PK Racing. The team operated as KV Racing Technology from 2003 until the end of the 2016 season.

The PacWest team's two cars were the cars used by main characters Jimmy Bly (#18) and Joe Tanto (#17) in the 2001 action movie Driven.

== Past drivers ==
- (United Kingdom) Mark Blundell (1996–2000)
- (New Zealand) Scott Dixon (2001–2002)
- (Germany) Dominic Dobson (1993–1994)
- (Italy) Teo Fabi (1996)
- (Argentina) Juan Manuel Fangio II (1995)
- (Brazil) Maurício Gugelmin (1995–2001)
- (Brazil) Roberto Moreno (1999)
- (Spain) Oriol Servia (2002)
- (United States) Scott Sharp (1994)
- (United States) Danny Sullivan (1995)

== Racing results ==
=== Complete CART FedEx Championship Series results ===
(key) (results in bold indicate pole position) (results in italics indicate fastest lap)

Year	Chassis	Engine	Tyres	Drivers	No.	1	2	3	4	5	6	7	8	9	10	11	12	13	14	15	16	17	18	19	20	21	Pts Pos	Pts
1993						SFR	PHX	LBH	INDY	MIL	DET	POR	CLE	TOR	MCH	NHA	ROA	VAN	MDO	NAZ	LAG							
1993	Galmer G92B	Chevrolet 265A V8t	G	(United States) Dominic Dobson	17													14	DNQ								39th	0
1993	Galmer G92B	Chevrolet 265C V8t	G	(United States) Dominic Dobson	17																18						39th	0
1994						SFR	PHX	LBH	INDY	MIL	DET	POR	CLE	TOR	MCH	MDO	NHA	VAN	ROA	NAZ	LAG							
1994	Lola T94/00	Ford XB V8t	G	(United States) Dominic Dobson	17	12	24	17	29	13	25	17	25	11	3	15	6	19	11	19	10						18th	30
1994	Lola T94/00	Ford XB V8t	G	(United States) Scott Sharp	71	11	9	28	16	12	13	18	24	16	12	11	24	12	10	15	21						21st	14
1995						MIA	SFR	PHX	LBH	NAZ	INDY	MIL	DET	POR	ROA	TOR	CLE	MCH	MDO	NHA	VAN	LAG						
1995	Reynard 95i	Ford XB V8t	G	(United States) Danny Sullivan	17	9	5	27	10	18	9	17	12	22	25	18	5	16									19th	32
1995	Reynard 95i	Ford XB V8t	G	(Argentina) Juan Manuel Fangio II	17														7	15	28	13					24th	6
1995	Reynard 95i	Ford XB V8t	G	(Brazil) Maurício Gugelmin	18	2	4	13	5	17	6*	14	15	7	24	12	23	11	6	11	20	3					10th	80
1996						MIA	RIO	SFR	LBH	NAZ	500	MIL	DET	POR	CLE	TOR	MCH	MDO	ROA	VAN	LAG							
1996	Reynard 96i	Ford XB V8t	G	(Brazil) Maurício Gugelmin	17	26	25	4	15	15	2	15	16	16	21	12	3	26	21	24	5						14th	53
1996	Reynard 96i	Ford XB V8t	G	(United Kingdom) Mark Blundell	21	17	27				5	22	5	8	11	11	6	10	20	12	24						16th	41
1996	Reynard 96i	Ford XB V8t	G	(Italy) Teo Fabi	21				18	16	Wth																36th	0
1997						MIA	SFR	LBH	NAZ	RIO	GAT	MIL	DET	POR	CLE	TOR	MCH	MDO	ROA	VAN	LAG	FON						
1997	Reynard 97i	Mercedes-Benz IC108D V8t	F	(Brazil) Maurício Gugelmin	17	6	17	2	9	**22**	6	5	16	6*	15	6	6	7	**2**	1	9	**4**					4th	132
1997	Reynard 97i	Mercedes-Benz IC108D V8t	F	(United Kingdom) Mark Blundell	18	14	8	13	19	8	24	12	17	1	9	1*	2	26	16*	7	2	1					6th	115
1998						MIA	MOT	LBH	NAZ	RIO	GAT	MIL	DET	POR	CLE	TOR	MCH	MDO	ROA	VAN	LAG	HOU	SFR	FON				
1998	Reynard 97i Reynard 98i	Mercedes-Benz IC108D V8t; Mercedes-Benz IC108E V8t	F	(Brazil) Maurício Gugelmin	17	10	20	10	17	9	16	21	19	7	20	12	13	4*	19	6	27	18	12	5			15th	49
1998	Reynard 97i Reynard 98i	Mercedes-Benz IC108D V8t; Mercedes-Benz IC108E V8t	F	(United Kingdom) Mark Blundell	18	12	10	7	20	11	10	12	22	22	10	26	17	19	7	12	25	14	11	6			18th	36
1999						MIA	MOT	LBH	NAZ	RIO	GAT	MIL	POR	CLE	ROA	TOR	MCH	DET	MDO	CHI	VAN	LAG	HOU	SRF	FON			
1999	Reynard 99i	Mercedes-Benz IC108E V8t	F	(Brazil) Maurício Gugelmin	17	11	7	14	18	22	18	8	25	21	12	14	22	24	20	19	4	11	6	26	6		16th	44
1999	Reynard 99i	Mercedes-Benz IC108E V8t	F	(United Kingdom) Mark Blundell	18	8	24	13	17									10	13	21	19	12	24	19	16		23rd	9
1999	Reynard 99i	Mercedes-Benz IC108E V8t	F	(Brazil) Roberto Moreno	18					11	4	12	7	8	19	4	19										14th	58
2000						MIA	LBH	RIO	MOT	NAZ	MIL	DET	POR	CLE	TOR	MCH	CHI	MDO	ROA	VAN	LAG	GAT	HOU	SRF	FON			
2000	Reynard 2Ki	Mercedes-Benz IC108F V8t	F	(Brazil) Maurício Gugelmin	17	16	10	21	22	2	11	16	19	10	15	13	7	20	17	21	7	19	23	10	17		17th	39
2000	Reynard 2Ki	Mercedes-Benz IC108F V8t	F	(United Kingdom) Mark Blundell	18	13	8	7	19	17	17	11	20	12	22	19	23	14	11	25	13	23	20	11	15		21st	18
2001						MTY	LBH	TEX	NAZ	MOT	MIL	DET	POR	CLE	TOR	MCH	CHI	MDO	ROA	VAN	LAU	ROC	HOU	LAG	SRF	FON		
2001	Reynard 01i	Toyota RV8F V8t	F	(Brazil) Maurício Gugelmin	17	15	22	C		12	10	10	20	**10**	7	15	22	14	23	15	16	20	20	16	24	20	24th	17
2001	Reynard 01i	Toyota RV8F V8t	F	(New Zealand) Scott Dixon	18	13	19	C	1	9	3	22	7	20	5	10	4	12	4	13	9	22	18	4	15	17	8th	98
2002						MTY	LBH	MOT	MIL	LAG	POR	CHI	TOR	CLE	VAN	MDO	ROA	MTL	DEN	ROC	MIA	SFR	FON	MXC				
2002	Lola B2/00	Toyota RV8F V8t	B	(New Zealand) Scott Dixon	7	6	18	9																			13th	97
2002	Lola B2/00	Toyota RV8F V8t	B	(Spain) Oriol Servià	17	10	11	6	Wth																		16th	44
