= 1996 Grand Prix of Miami =

(United States) 1996 Homestead
Race details
- Race 1 of 16 in the 1996 IndyCar season
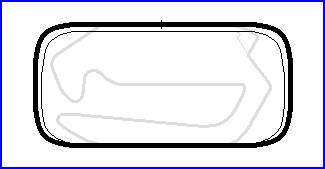
- Date: March 3, 1996
- Official name: Marlboro Grand Prix of Miami
- Location: Homestead, Florida, United States
- Course: Oval; 1.527 mi / 2.457 km
- Distance: 133 laps 203.091 mi / 326.843 km
- Weather: Temperatures reaching up to 66.9 °F (19.4 °C); wind speeds up to 14.7 miles per hour (23.7 km/h)

Pole position
- Driver: (Canada) Paul Tracy (Penske Racing)
- Time: 27.681

Fastest lap
- Driver: (Canada) Greg Moore (Forsythe Racing)
- Time: 28.385 (on lap 131 of 133)

Podium
- First: (United States) Jimmy Vasser (Chip Ganassi Racing)
- Second: (Brazil) Gil de Ferran (Hall Racing)
- Third: (United States) Robby Gordon (Walker Racing)

The 1996 Marlboro Grand Prix of Miami Presented by Toyota was a CART race at the Metro-Dade Homestead Motorsports Complex, held on March 3, 1996. It was the first round of the 1996 IndyCar season, and first CART race since the open-wheel split in 1996. It was preceded in the 1996 racing season by the inaugural Indy Racing League race in Orlando, which was not contested by any of the CART drivers that appeared at Homestead. Jimmy Vasser scored the first win of his CART career. It was also the second major racing event at the recently completed 1.527-mile oval, which had previously hosted a NASCAR Busch Grand National event in November 1995.

== Report ==
=== Qualifying ===
Due to rain on Saturday afternoon, the qualifying session occurred on Sunday morning. Canadian driver Paul Tracy, on his return to Marlboro Team Penske after spending a year at Newman/Haas Racing, set the pole with a lap of 198.590 mph (27.681s) in a Penske PC25-Mercedes car. All of the qualified cars were newly built for the 1996 season, with CART having adopted new technical rules that altered the underbody tunnels and sidepods, and were expected to reduce downforce and increase the focus on mechanical grip.

=== Race ===
On the start, Mark Blundell spun and Roberto Moreno had an unrelated contact with the wall. Then, the start was aborted for the second time, as Tracy was deemed to have jumped the start. At the end of lap 1, another caution came out as Michael Andretti hit Maurício Gugelmin and lost his front wing. After the restart, Tracy continued to lead for 8 laps of racing, until rain began to fall. The cars circulated under caution period conditions until the decision was made to red flag the race with Tracy in the lead.

The race restarted after a half-hour delay, with Tracy continuing to lead the race comfortably while second-place was contested between Gil de Ferran, Vasser, and Scott Pruett. Meanwhile, Al Unser Jr. hit Carlos Guerrero, and fell a lap down to repair his front wing. Andre Ribeiro and Robby Gordon made contact on Lap 82 while fighting for position, bringing out a caution period. During the ensuing pit stops, Tracy retired from the lead due to a transmission failure. On the same lap, rookie Alex Zanardi crashed under caution as his wheel separated following his pit stop.

Light rain again delayed the restart until Lap 102. De Ferran led at the restart, but slower traffic in front of the leaders enabled Vasser to overtake and hold onto the lead until the finish.

Pos	No.	Driver	Team	Chassis	Engine	Tyre	Laps	Time/Retired	Grid	Laps Led	Points
1	12	(United States) Jimmy Vasser	Target/Chip Ganassi Racing	Reynard 96I	Honda	F	133	1:51:23.100	3	32	20
2	8	(Brazil) Gil de Ferran	Hall Racing	Reynard 96I	Honda	G	133	+ 3.156	2	18	16
3	5	(United States) Robby Gordon	Walker Racing	Reynard 96I	Ford XD	G	133	+ 3.740	7	0	14
4	20	(United States) Scott Pruett	Patrick Racing	Lola T95/00	Ford XD	F	133	+ 3.744	4	0	12
5	18	(United States) Bobby Rahal	Team Rahal	Reynard 96I	Mercedes	G	133	+ 4.368	5	0	10
6	11	(Brazil) Christian Fittipaldi	Newman/Haas Racing	Lola T96/00	Ford XD	G	133	+ 16.664	15	0	8
7	99	(Canada) Greg Moore R	Forsythe Racing	Reynard 96I	Mercedes	F	133	+ 20.660	6	0	6
8	2	(United States) Al Unser Jr.	Marlboro Team Penske	Penske PC25	Mercedes	G	132	+ 1 lap	13	0	5
9	6	(United States) Michael Andretti	Newman/Haas Racing	Lola T96/00	Ford XD	G	132	+ 1 lap	10	0	4
10	28	(United States) Bryan Herta	Team Rahal	Reynard 96I	Mercedes	G	131	+ 2 laps	11	0	3
11	32	(Mexico) Adrian Fernandez	Tasman Motorsports	Lola T96/00	Honda	F	131	+ 2 laps	16	0	2
12	15	(Canada) Scott Goodyear	Walker Racing	Reynard 96I	Ford XB	G	131	+ 2 laps	22	0	1
13	9	(Brazil) Emerson Fittipaldi	Hogan Penske Racing	Penske PC25	Mercedes	G	131	+ 2 laps	12	0	0
14	1	(Brazil) Raul Boesel	Brahma Sports Team	Reynard 96I	Ford XD	G	131	+ 2 laps	17	0	0
15	10	(United States) Eddie Lawson R	Galles Racing	Lola T96/00	Mercedes	G	131	+ 2 laps	20	0	0
16	31	(Brazil) Andre Ribeiro	Tasman Motorsports	Lola T96/00	Honda	F	130	+ 3 laps	9	0	0
17	21	(United Kingdom) Mark Blundell R	PacWest Racing Group	Reynard 96I	Ford XB	G	129	+ 4 laps	19	0	0
18	19	(Japan) Hiro Matsushita	Payton/Coyne Racing	Lola T96/00	Ford XB	F	124	+ 9 laps	23	0	0
19	16	(Sweden) Stefan Johansson	Bettenhausen Motorsports	Reynard 96I	Mercedes	G	115	Transmission	18	0	0
20	22	(Mexico) Carlos Guerrero	Scandia/Simon Racing	Lola T96/00	Ford XB	G	112	+ 21 laps	21	0	0
21	36	(Argentina) Juan Manuel Fangio II	All American Racers	Eagle Mk. V	Toyota	G	108	Fuel	26	0	0
22	25	(United States) Jeff Krosnoff R	Arciero-Wells Racing	Reynard 96I	Toyota	F	102	Engine	25	0	0
23	3	(Canada) Paul Tracy	Marlboro Team Penske	Penske PC25	Mercedes	G	84	Transmission	1	83	2
24	4	(Italy) Alex Zanardi R	Target/Chip Ganassi Racing	Reynard 96I	Honda	F	83	Accident	14	0	0
25	7	(Brazil) Marco Greco	Scandia/Simon Racing	Lola T96/00	Ford XB	G	64	Electrical	24	0	0
26	17	(Brazil) Mauricio Gugelmin	PacWest Racing Group	Reynard 96I	Ford XB	G	53	Accident	8	0	0
	34	(Brazil) Roberto Moreno	Payton/Coyne Racing	Lola T96/00	Ford XB	F	0	Accident	27	-	-
	49	(United States) Parker Johnstone	Brix Comptech Racing	Reynard 96I	Honda	F	-	Accident in practice	-	-	-

=== Race statistics ===
Lap Leaders
Laps	Leader
1–83	Paul Tracy
84-101	Gil de Ferran
102-133	Jimmy Vasser

=== Notes ===
- First CART race: Greg Moore, Eddie Lawson, Mark Blundell, Jeff Krosnoff, Alex Zanardi
- Parker Johnstone did not start the race, having suffered a concussion from a practice crash.
- All American Racers returned to CART as a team and a constructor for the first time since 1986.
- This was the first CART race since 1991 that long-time entrant A. J. Foyt Enterprises did not enter, as Foyt had elected to participate in the new Indy Racing League instead.

== Championship standings after the race ==
Drivers' Championship standings

Pos	Driver	Points
1	(United States) Jimmy Vasser	20
2	(Brazil) Gil de Ferran	16
3	(United States) Robby Gordon	14
4	(United States) Scott Pruett	12
5	(United States) Bobby Rahal	10
