= Parker Johnstone =

American race car driver and announcer

Parker Johnstone III
- Nationality: American
- Born: Parker Lochiel Johnstone III; March 27, 1961 (age 65) Ft. Benning, Georgia, U.S.
- Retired: 1997

CART World Series
- Years active: 1994–1997
- Teams: Comptech (1994–1996); Team Green (1997)
- Starts: 48
- Wins: 0
- Poles: 1
- Best finish: 2nd Long Beach Grand Prix in 1996

Previous series
- 1989-1993 1987-1990 1987 1987 1986 1984-1986 1984-1986 1984-1985: IMSA Camel Lights; IMSA International Sedan; Pro Formula Atlantic; Tasman Formula Pacific; SCCA GT-4; Playboy/Escort Series; Firehawk Series; IMSA Renault Cup

Championship titles
- 1991-1993 1987-1988 1986 1985: IMSA Camel Lights Champion; IMSA International Sedan Champion; SCCA GT-4 National Champion; Renault Cup National Champion

Parker Lochiel Johnstone III (born March 27, 1961) is a former race car driver and motorsports announcer from Redmond, Oregon. An accomplished musician, he was the principal trumpet of the International Youth Orchestra, touring Europe, playing with Herbert von Karajan and the Berlin Philharmonic, and famed pianist Van Cliburn. Instead of attending Juilliard School of Music, he went to the engineering school at the University of California, Berkeley, where he received his degree in 1982.

== Early career ==
Johnstone began his amateur racing career while in high school while working as a systems programmer in Silicon Valley part-time to pay for his new hobby, racing automobiles. Winning at SCCA events, he worked as an instructor at the Bob Bondurant School of High Performance Driving after college. He continued to win while driving Corvettes and import sedans. Honda hired him to drive during the 1984 season. He won numerous events in the IMSA Firehawk series. He finished 2nd in the Renault Cup National Championship in 1984, earning a spot with the factory Renault team to race in Europe. He returned to the United States to win the Renault Cup championship in 1985. In 1986 he won the SCCA National Road Racing Championship driving for Honda in the GT-4 class. He also won IMSA championships in International Sedan for Acura in 1987 and 1988. In 1987, he was also the rookie of the year in the pro-Formula Atlantic division. He competed in the Tasman Formula Pacific series in New Zealand in 1987. He won the IMSA Camel Lights sports car championship 3 years in a row, from 1991 to 1993, setting all-time qualifying and race win records, including winning the 24 Hours of Daytona twice, the 12 Hours of Sebring, and 1000km Suzuka event in Japan. He finished second in both 1989 and 1990 in the IMSA International Sedan Championship. He left professional sports car racing having set the all-time IMSA race win record at 54 victories.

=== CART/IndyCar ===
A road course specialist, Johnstone drove in mainly road course races in the 1994 and 1995 CART/IndyCar seasons for Comptech Racing. Significantly, in his oval debut at the 1995 Michigan 500, he qualified on the pole with a new track record, giving Honda its first ever champ car pole position. He dominated the race until sidelined with a mechanical problem. In 1995, he also set the closed course world speed record in excess of 238 mph. He then moved up and ran the full season in 1996. For 1997, he moved to Team Green Racing. Although he led several IndyCar races, his best CART finish was a second place that came in 1996 at the Long Beach Grand Prix.

== Retirement ==
After he retired from professional racing after 21 years, Johnstone became the color analyst commentator for ABC's/ESPN's coverage of IndyCar/CART racing. When ABC stopped covering IndyCar/CART he was moved to cover the pit action and work as the technical pit analyst for the NHRA coverage for ESPN. After three years of covering the NHRA Drag Racing Championship, he left broadcasting to oversee and operate a Honda dealership in Wilsonville, Oregon. Several of his historically significant race cars are on display there. He is currently racing in SCCA competition as well as competing in vintage racing in several different types of cars.

Johnstone is an Eagle Scout. He is an instrument, commercial, certified flight instructor pilot and has competed and won in aerobatic competitions. He is scuba certified. He has appeared in over 50 TV commercials as well as performed as a stuntman in the action film Speed. He is a member of both the Screen Actors Guild (SAG) and the American Federation of Television and Radio Artists (AFTRA). He has competed in triathlons and cycling races. He lives in Wilsonville, where he served as member of the city's Parks and Rec board for five years. He also served on the board of directors for the Children's Cancer Association.

== Racing record ==
=== SCCA National Championship Runoffs ===
Year	Track	Car	Engine	Class	Finish	Start	Status
1986	Road Atlanta	Honda CRX		GT-4	1	1	Running

=== American Open Wheel ===
(key)

==== CART ====
Year	Team	Chassis	Engine	1	2	3	4	5	6	7	8	9	10	11	12	13	14	15	16	17	Rank	Points	Ref
1994	Comptech	Lola T94/00	Honda HRX V8t	SRF	PHX	LBH	INDY	MIL	DET	POR; 19	CLE; 17	TOR; 27	MIS	MDO; 23	NHM	VAN; 13	ROA	NZR	LS; 17		35th	0	
1995	Comptech	Reynard 95i	Honda HRH V8t	MIA	SRF	PHX	LBH	NZR	INDY	MIL	DET; 19	POR	ROA; 12	TOR	CLE; 11	MIS; 22	MDO; 28	NHM	VAN; 11	LS; 17	27th	6	
1996	Comptech	Reynard 96i	Honda HRH V8t	MIA; DNS	RIO; 16	SRF; 24	LBH; 2	NZR; 20	500; 11	MIL; 16	DET; 14	POR; 5	CLE; 25	TOR; 26	MIS; 18	MDO; 12	ROA; 11	VAN; 11	LS; 13		17th	33	
1997	Team Green	Reynard 97i	Honda HRR V8t	MIA; 8	SRF; 21	LBH; 5	NZR; 17	RIO; 12	STL; 7	MIL; 25	DET; 20	POR; 9	CLE; 10	TOR; 12	MIS; 25	MDO; 12	ROA; 23	VAN; 11	LS; 12	FON; 11	16th	36	
