= Jeff Krosnoff =

American racing driver

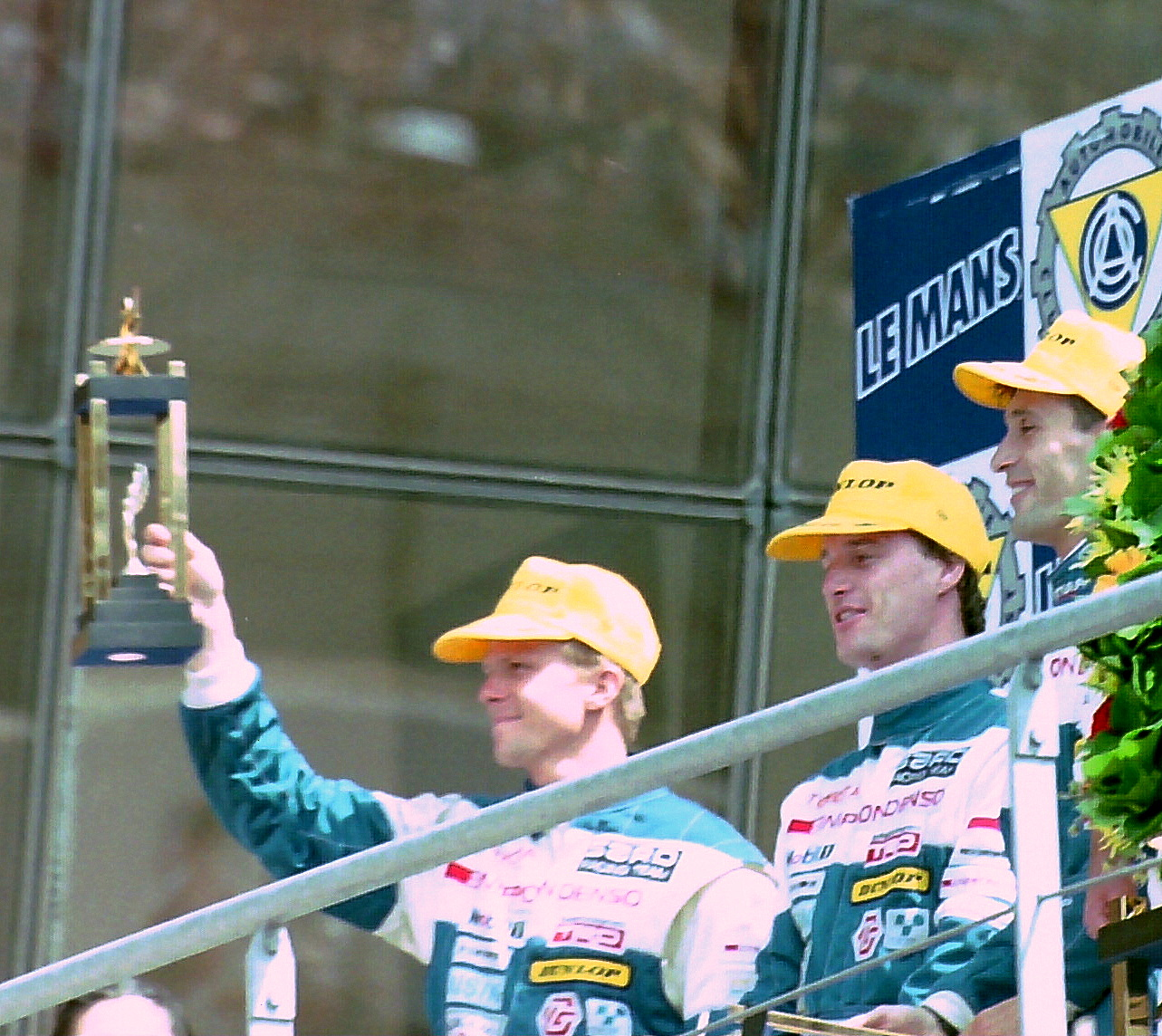
- Krosnoff, Eddie Irvine and Mauro Martini, runners-up at 1994 24 Hours of Le Mans
- Born: Jeffrey John Krosnoff; September 24, 1964; Tulsa, Oklahoma, United States
- Died: July 14, 1996 (aged 31); Toronto, Ontario, Canada
- Cause of death: Racing accident

Champ Car career
- 11 races run over 1 year
- Years active: 1996
- Team: Arciero-Wells
- Best finish: 35th - 1996
- First race: 1996 Marlboro Grand Prix of Miami (Homestead)
- Last race: 1996 Molson Indy Toronto (Exhibition Place)
Wins	Podiums	Poles
0	0	0

Jeffrey John Krosnoff (September 24, 1964 – July 14, 1996) was an American race car driver. A competitor in the CART PPG Indy Car World Series, he was killed in a racing accident during the 1996 Molson Indy Toronto.

== Early life and career ==
Krosnoff was born in Tulsa, Oklahoma, but grew up in La Cañada, California, where he attended Flintridge Preparatory School, a private high school. He then attended the University of California, San Diego for one year beginning in September 1982. Afterward, he transferred to UCLA, where he majored in Business. Throughout his college career, Krosnoff was focused on pursuing his dream of professional racecar driving.

Krosnoff competed in Japan in Formula 3000, where he was active from 1989 to 1995. Krosnoff also competed in the 24 Hours of Le Mans several times, scoring second in 1994. In the 1996 season, he made 11 starts in the CART series, driving a Reynard-Toyota for Arciero-Wells Racing.

== Death ==
On July 14, 1996, with four laps to go in the Molson Indy Toronto at Exhibition Place, Krosnoff's car made wheel-to-wheel contact with the car of Stefan Johansson, sending it into the air, over a concrete barrier, and into the catch fencing lining the street course. The fence did not stop the car enough to keep it from hitting a tree which was outside the fence. The car then rotated into a light post which was located inside the fence near the tree.

The violence of the accident left the car broken in half and sent the cockpit section back across the track, and the race was ended ahead of time due to the amount of debris blocking the course. Even though the paramedics were there almost immediately, Krosnoff died instantly after his head struck the tree and then suffered major internal injuries when his car hit the light post. A track official, Gary Avrin, was also killed in the accident when he was struck by the right front wheel of Krosnoff's then-airborne car. Krosnoff was declared dead minutes later at a local hospital, with the cause of death being listed as "massive head and chest injuries, skeletal injuries, and complete cardiac arrest."

== Career results ==
=== Complete 24 Hours of Le Mans results ===
Year	Class	No	Tyres	Car	Team	Co-Drivers	Laps	Pos.	Class Pos.
1991	C2	36	**G**	Jaguar XJR-12; Jaguar 7.4L V12	(United Kingdom) TWR Suntec Jaguar	(United Kingdom) David Leslie (Italy) Mauro Martini	183	DNF	DNF
1994	LMP1 /C90	1	**D**	Toyota 94C-V; Toyota R36V 3.6 L Turbo V8	(Japan) SARD Company Ltd.	(United Kingdom) Eddie Irvine (Italy) Mauro Martini	343	**2nd**	**1st**
1995	GT1	27	**D**	Toyota Supra LM; Toyota 3S-GTE 2.1L Turbo I4	(Japan) SARD Co. Ltd.	(Italy) Marco Apicella (Italy) Mauro Martini	264	14th	8th

=== Japanese Top Formula Championship results ===
(key) (Races in bold indicate pole position) (Races in italics indicate fastest lap)

Year	Team	1	2	3	4	5	6	7	8	9	10	11	DC	Pts
1988	Speed Star Wheel Racing Team	SUZ	FUJ	MIN	SUZ	SUG	FUJ	SUZ	SUZ; 13				NC	0
1989	Speed Star Wheel Racing Team	SUZ	FUJ; 5	MIN; 9	SUZ; Ret	SUG; Ret	FUJ; 13	SUZ; 9	SUZ; 3				12th	6
1990	Suntec Racing	SUZ; 10	FUJ; Ret	MIN; DNQ	SUZ; 3	SUG; 10	FUJ; Ret	FUJ; 4	SUZ; 5	FUJ; 17	SUZ; 3		7th	13
1991	Suntec Racing	SUZ; 7	AUT; 10	FUJ; 4	MIN; Ret	SUZ; Ret	SUG; 14	FUJ; 17	SUZ; Ret	FUJ; C	SUZ; 9	FUJ; 4	14th	6
1992	Speed Star Wheel Racing Team	SUZ; 12	FUJ; 9	MIN; Ret	SUZ; 13	AUT; 11	SUG; 14	FUJ; Ret	FUJ; 24	SUZ; 10	FUJ	FUJ	NC	0
1993	Speed Star Wheel Racing Team	SUZ; 14	FUJ; 13	MIN; 2	SUZ; 13	AUT; C	SUG; Ret	FUJ; C	FUJ; 11	SUZ; 11	FUJ; 13	SUZ; 15	11th	6
1994	Giza Racing Team	SUZ; 6	FUJ; 11	MIN; Ret									16th	1
1994	Speed Star Wheel Racing Team				SUZ	SUG	FUJ	SUZ; 12	FUJ; 7	FUJ; 16	SUZ; Ret		16th	1
1995	Team 5Zigen	SUZ; 10	FUJ; C	MIN; 9	SUZ; 12	SUG; 9	FUJ; 10	TOK; Ret	FUJ; 12	SUZ; Ret			NC	0

=== All-Japan Sports Prototype Championship results ===
Year	Team	Car	Class	1	2	3	4	5	6	7	DC	Pts
1991	TWR Suntec Jaguar	Jaguar XJR-11	C1	FUJ	FUJ; Ret	FUJ; Ret	SUZ; Ret	SUG; 6	FUJ; 5		18th	12
1991	TWR Suntec Jaguar	Jaguar XJR-14	C1							SUG; 2	18th	12
1992	Nismo	Nissan R92CP	C1	SUZ; 1	FUJ; 4	FUJ; 5	SUG	FUJ			9th	38
1992	Nismo	Nissan NP35	C						MIN; 4		6th	10

=== Complete JGTC results ===
(key) (Races in bold indicate pole position) (Races in italics indicate fastest lap)

Year	Team	Car	Class	1	2	3	4	5	6	DC	Pts
1994	Toyota Team SARD	Toyota Supra	GT1	FUJ	SEN	FUJ	SUG; Ret	MIN; 10		27th	1
1995	Toyota Team SARD	Toyota Supra	GT1	SUZ; 3	FUJ; 12	SEN; 5	FUJ; 16	SUG; 3	MIN; 11	8th	32

=== American Open-Wheel racing results ===
(key)

==== CART ====
Year	Team	1	2	3	4	5	6	7	8	9	10	11	12	13	14	15	16	Rank	Points	Ref
1996	Arciero-Wells Racing	MIA; 22	RIO; 26	SRF; 18	LBH; 26	NZR; 18	500; 18	MIL; 18	DET; 15	POR; 17	CLE; 16	TOR; 16	MIS	MDO	ROA	VAN	LS	**35th**	**0**	
