= Lola T96/00 =

Racing car designed and built by Lola Cars

- Category: CART IndyCar
- Constructor: Lola
- Predecessor: Lola T95/00
- Successor: Lola T97/00

Technical specifications
- Length: 4,978 mm (196 in)
- Width: 2,032 mm (80 in)
- Height: 940 mm (37 in)
- Axle track: 1,753 mm (69 in) (Front); 1,638 mm (64 in) (Rear)
- Wheelbase: 3,048 mm (120 in)
- Engine: Ford/Cosworth XB; Mercedes-Benz IC108; Honda turbo Indy V8 engine 2.65 L (2,650 cc; 162 cu in) mid-engined
- Transmission: 6-speed manual
- Weight: 1,550 lb (700 kg)
- Fuel: Methanol
- Tyres: Goodyear

Competition history
- Debut: 1996 Grand Prix of Miami

The Lola T96/00 is an open-wheel racing car chassis, designed and built by Lola Cars that competed in the CART open-wheel racing series, for competition in the 1996 IndyCar season. It was slightly more competitive than its predecessors, scoring 8 wins that season. It was mainly powered by the 800–850 hp (600–630 kW) Ford/Cosworth XB turbo engine, but also used the Mercedes-Benz IC108 engine, and the Honda turbo Indy V8 engine.
