= Toyota RV8 engine =

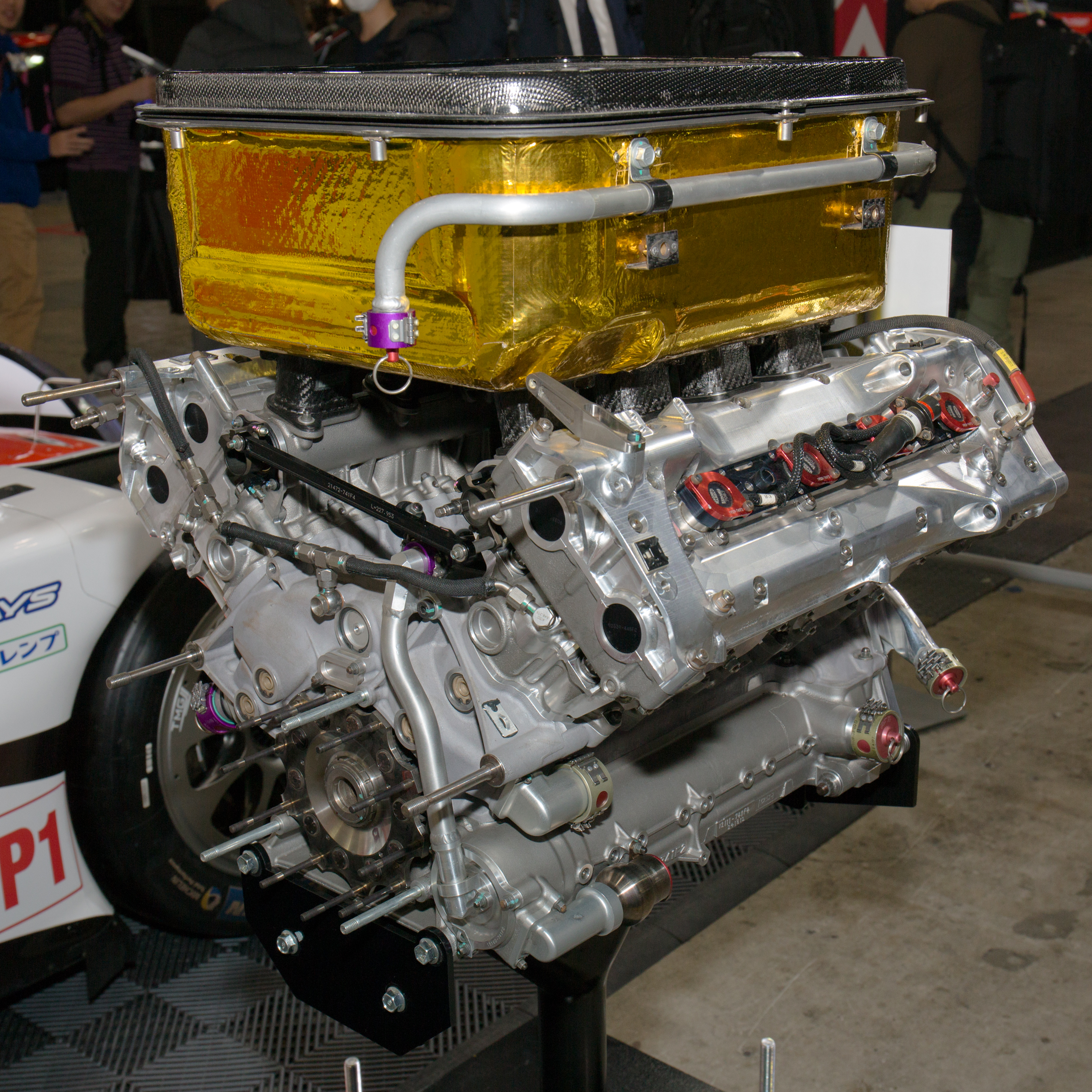
- The RV8 on display at the 2017 Tokyo Auto Salon

Overview
- Manufacturer: TRD
- Production: 1996–2015

Layout
- Configuration: 90° V8
- Displacement: 2.6 L (2,641 cc); 3.0 L (2,998 cc); 3.4 L (3,396 cc); 3.7 L (3,695 cc)
- Cylinder bore: 93 mm (3.66 in)
- Piston stroke: 48.6 mm (1.91 in); 55.16 mm (2.17 in); 62.5 mm (2.46 in); 68 mm (2.68 in)
- Cylinder block material: Aluminum alloy
- Cylinder head material: Aluminum alloy
- Valvetrain: 32-valve (four-valves per cylinder), DOHC

Combustion
- Turbocharger: Only in CART era
- Fuel system: Electronic indirect multi-point port fuel injection
- Management: Pectel MQ12
- Fuel type: Total/Shell V-Power Gasoline; 100% fuel grade Methanol provided by Sunoco (Indy engine)
- Oil system: Dry sump
- Cooling system: Single water pump

Output
- Power output: LMP1: 382–390 kW (520–530 PS; 513–523 hp); CART: 625–677 kW (850–920 PS; 838–907 hp)
- Torque output: 290–354 lb⋅ft (393–480 N⋅m)

Dimensions
- Dry weight: 265 lb (120 kg) excluding headers, clutch, ECU, spark box or filters

Chronology
- Predecessor: Toyota R32V/R36V engine
- Successor: Toyota H8909 engine

The Toyota RV8 engine family is a series of race car engines designed, developed and produced by Toyota Racing Development. They come in 2.65-liter, 3.0-liter and 3.4-liter, turbocharged and naturally-aspirated, V8 racing engine versions. They are used in the CART series, IRL IndyCar Series, Formula Nippon, Super GT, and Le Mans Prototype sports car racing, from 1996 to 2015. The naturally-aspirated engine, formerly used in Formula Nippon and Super GT, is itself derived from the Toyota Indy V8 Indy car racing V8 engine.

== TS030 Hybrid engine ==
The TS030 uses a naturally aspirated gasoline 3.4-litre (210 cu in) V8 power unit, mounted at a 90-degree cylinder bank angle, and produces 530 horsepower (400 kW; 540 PS). Toyota engineers elected to base the engine on their Super GT project instead of constructing a new one. The six-speed sequential gearbox unit was transverse-mounted to the engine and the brakes were constructed from carbon materials.

The TS030 Hybrid featured a Kinetic energy recovery system (KERS) regenerative braking device produced by Toyota Racing Development (the Le Mans organisers, Automobile Club de l'Ouest (ACO), use the alternate name ERS) to charge a super capacitor. The extra power is directed to the rear wheels, giving an automatic horsepower increase of 300 bhp (220 kW; 300 PS). Its motor generator unit acts as a generator under braking; this allows it to harvest direct energy from the drive shaft which slows the car and converts energy into electricity that is stored in the super capacitor, which was supplied by Nisshinbo and mounted in the car's passenger compartment. The result allows for faster lap times when the driver exits track turns and saves fuel by reducing engine usage leaving a corner. Toyota chose Aisin AW to build the front electric motor while Denso were selected to build the rear power unit.

== TS040 Hybrid engine ==
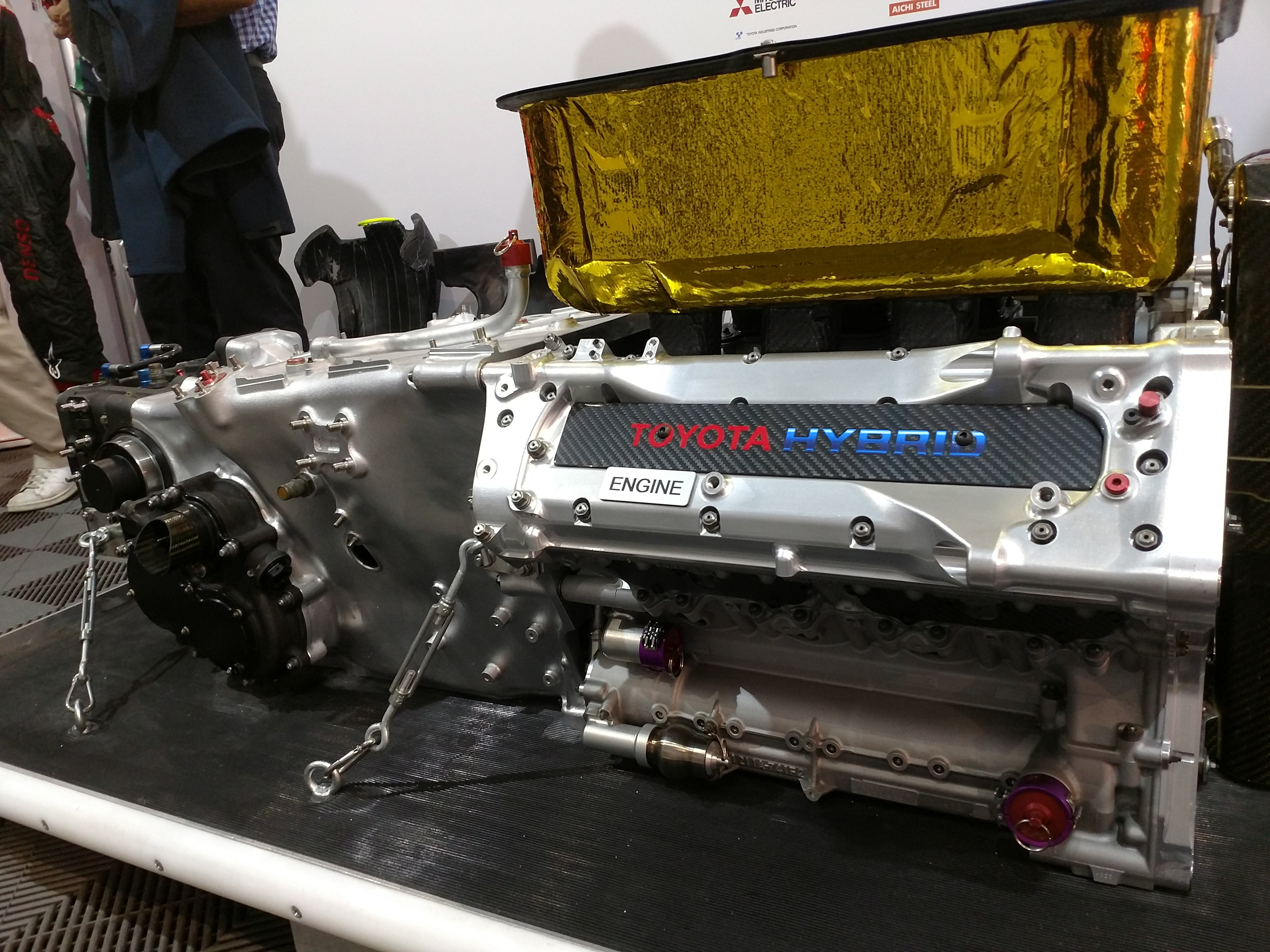
The Toyota TS040 Hybrid 3.7l V8 petrol engine and gearbox assembly on display

The TS040 Hybrid also uses mid-mounted, naturally-aspirated petrol V8 engine, angled at 90 degrees, was carried over from the TS030 Hybrid. Its displacement, increased from 3.4 L (210 cu in) to 3.7 L (230 cu in) by lengthening the stroke for better efficiency, supplies 520 PS (382 kW; 513 hp) to the rear wheels, which combines with the electric motor to produce 1,000 PS (735 kW; 986 hp). The engine was developed to run with a fuel flow metre promoting a concept switch to efficiency from power. The bosses-mounted injection system were in the inlet tract and placed over the angled throttle valves relative to the inlet path. They were fitted with eight solenoid injectors which sent power each of the throttle runners and into the inlet portlets. Toyota installed two systems featuring knock control to detect vibration and real-time combustion pressure sensors to tune the spark timing among other engine components during a race for reliability purposes.

== Applications ==
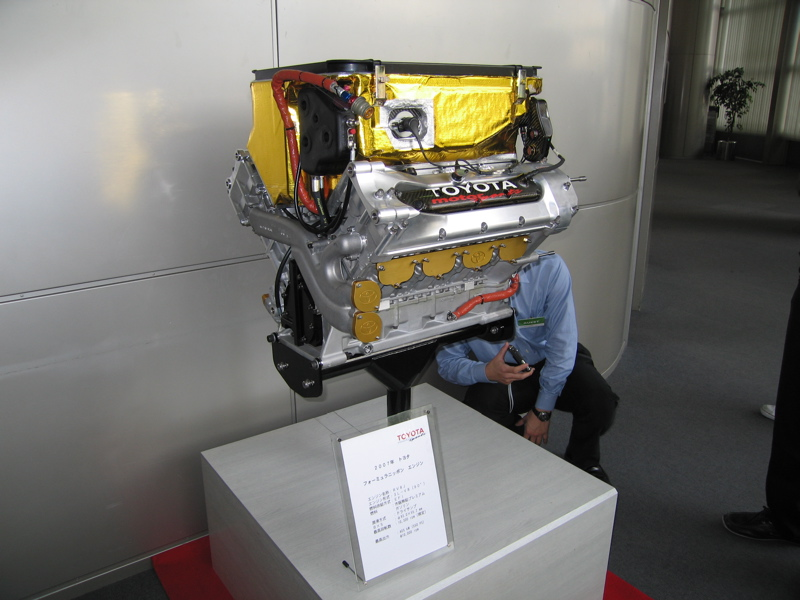
Toyota RV8J engine

=== Formula Nippon/Super Formula ===
- Lola B06/51
- Swift FN09

=== LMP1 ===
- Lola B10/60
- Rebellion R-One (2014)
- Toyota TS030 Hybrid
- Toyota TS040 Hybrid

=== Super GT (GT300) ===
- Toyota Prius APR GT

=== CART/IndyCar series ===
- Reynard 96I
- Reynard 97I
- Reynard 98I
- Eagle MK-V
- Eagle 987
- Eagle 997
- Reynard 02I
- Lola B02/00
- Swift 010.c
