= Mercedes-Benz Indy V8 engine =

Ilmor 265-D (1994) Mercedes-Benz IC108 (1995–2000)

Overview
- Manufacturer: Ilmor-Mercedes
- Production: 1994–2000

Layout
- Configuration: 72°–82° V-8
- Displacement: 2.65 L (161.7 cu in)
- Cylinder bore: 91 mm (3.6 in)
- Piston stroke: 50.9 mm (2.0 in)
- Cylinder block material: Aluminum
- Cylinder head material: Aluminum
- Valvetrain: 16-valve to 32-valve, OHV/DOHC, two-valves per cylinder to four-valves per cylinder
- Compression ratio: 12.4:1

Combustion
- Turbocharger: Garrett single-turbocharger
- Fuel system: Electronic fuel injection
- Fuel type: Methanol
- Oil system: Dry sump
- Cooling system: Liquid cooling

Output
- Power output: 800–1,000 hp (597–746 kW)
- Torque output: 345–540 lb⋅ft (468–732 N⋅m)

Dimensions
- Dry weight: 95–123 kg (209–271 lb)

Chronology
- Predecessor: Ilmor 265-C
- Successor: Chevrolet Indy V8 (2002)

The Mercedes-Benz Indy V8 engine, known as the Ilmor 265-D (1994), and later the Mercedes-Benz IC108 (1995–2000), is a powerful, turbocharged, 2.65-liter, Indy car racing V-8 engine, specially designed, developed, and built by Ilmor, in partnership and collaboration with Mercedes-Benz, to compete in the CART series; between 1994 and 2000.

== Background ==
The 265-D engine was introduced for the 1994 season, which replaced the 265-C, although some of the smaller teams still ran the "C" throughout 1994. Without badging support, the engines were referred to simply as the "Ilmor-C" and the "Ilmor-D". This engine was said to produce about 30 hp (22 kW) more than the Ford-Cosworth XB used at the time.

In 1995, Mercedes-Benz became the badging manufacturer for the Ilmor Indy car engines. The engine continued to be a strong contender on the CART circuit. In 1996, the open-wheel "split" began between CART and the IRL. Ilmor primarily was a provider for CART-based teams, and did not provide engines for any full-time IRL teams. At the 1996 Indy 500, the Ilmor Mercedes-Benz D was used by Galles Racing, and finished second, the powerplant's one and only start in an IRL-sanctioned race. When the IRL switched to normally aspirated engines for 1997, the 265s were no longer permitted in the IRL and the Indy 500, and from that point on raced in the CART series exclusively.

== Applications ==
- Penske PC-22
- Penske PC-23
- Penske PC-24
- Penske PC-25
- Penske PC-26
- Penske PC-27
- Reynard 94I
- Reynard 95I
- Reynard 96I
- Reynard 97I
- Reynard 98I
- Reynard 99I
- Reynard 2KI
- Lola T94/00
- Lola T95/00
- Lola T96/00
- Lola B99/00
- Lola B2K/00
