= Reynard 96I =

Racing car designed and built by Reynard Racing Cars

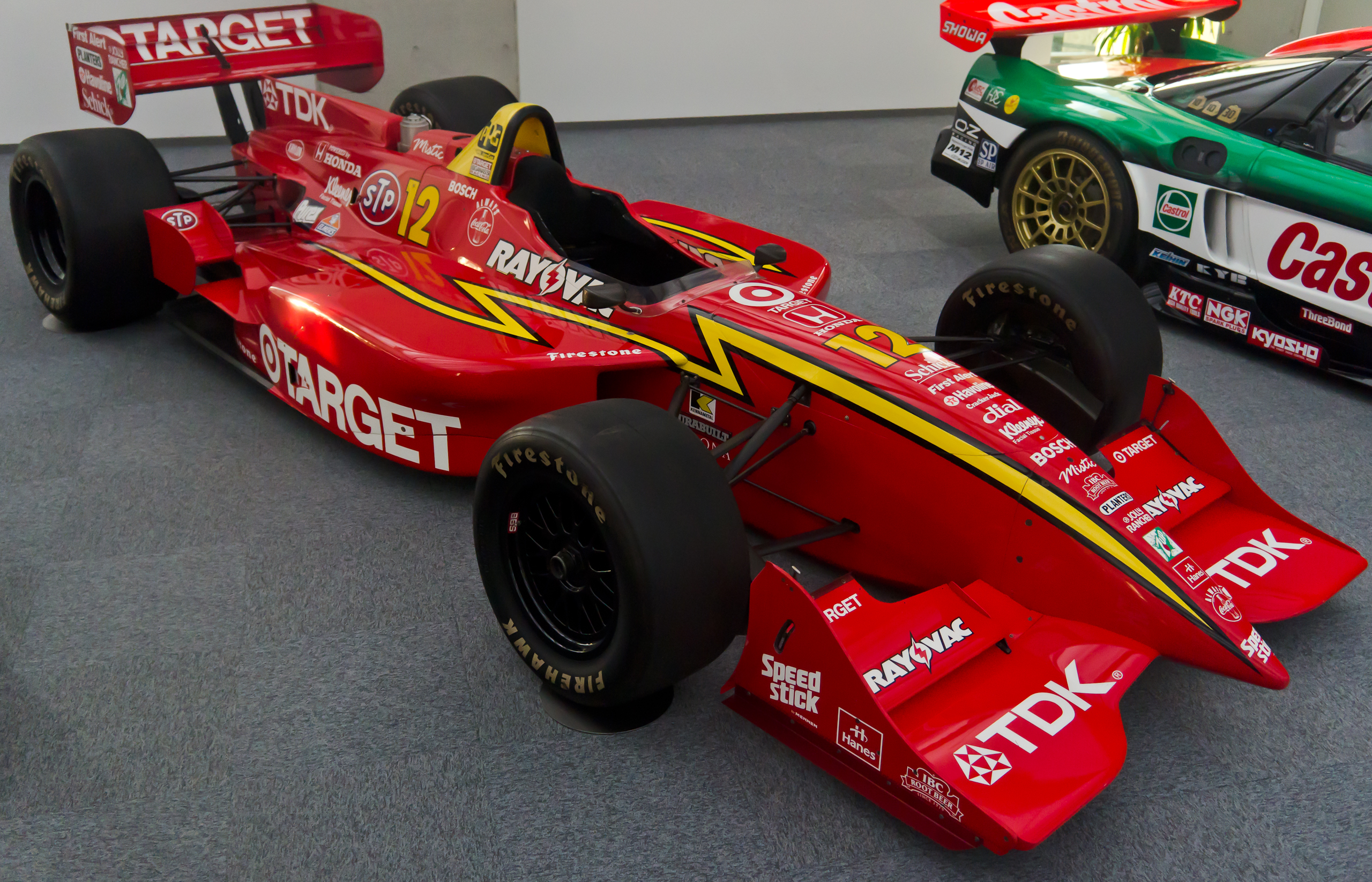
- Category: CART IndyCar
- Constructor: Reynard Racing Cars
- Predecessor: Reynard 95I
- Successor: Reynard 97I

Technical specifications
- Engine: Ford/Cosworth XB/XD; Honda Indy V8 turbo Mercedes-Benz IC108; Toyota RV8A 2.65 L (2,650 cc; 162 cu in) V8 mid-engined
- Transmission: 6-speed sequential manual
- Weight: 1,550 lb (700 kg)
- Fuel: Methanol
- Tyres: Goodyear Eagle; Firestone

Competition history
- Debut: 1996 Grand Prix of Miami; Miami, Florida

The Reynard 96I is an open-wheel racing car designed and built by Reynard Racing Cars that competed in the 1996 and 1997 IndyCar seasons, notable for winning the first CART race it entered, and the constructors' and drivers' titles later that year, being driven by Jimmy Vasser.
