= Penske PC-27 =

Penske PC-27 Penske PC-27B
- Category: CART IndyCar
- Constructor: Penske Cars Ltd.
- Designer: John Travis
- Predecessor: Penske PC-26

Technical specifications
- Chassis: Carbon-fiber monocoque
- Suspension (front): Double wishbone, inboard spring/shock absorber units (operated by push rods)
- Suspension (rear): Double wishbone, inboard spring/shock absorber units (operated by push rods)
- Length: 4,877 mm (192 in)
- Width: 1,994 mm (79 in)
- Axle track: Front: 1,730 mm (68 in); Rear: 1,630 mm (64 in)
- Wheelbase: 2,972 mm (117 in)
- Engine: Mercedes-Benz IC108E 2.65 L (2,650 cc; 162 cu in) V8, DOHC single turbocharged Mid-engined, longitudinally mounted
- Transmission: 6-speed sequential manual
- Weight: 703 kg (1,550 lb)
- Fuel: Methanol supplied by 76
- Lubricants: Mobil 1
- Tyres: Goodyear Eagle Speedway Special Radial 25.5in x 9.5in x 15in (front); 27in x 14.5in x 15in (rear)

Competition history
- Notable entrants: Marlboro Team Penske
- Notable drivers: (United States) Al Unser Jr. (Brazil) Andre Ribeiro (Brazil) Tarso Marques (United States) Alex Barron
- Debut: 1998 Marlboro Grand Prix of Miami
Races	Wins	Poles	F/Laps
30	0	0	0
- Teams' Championships: 0
- Constructors' Championships: 0
- Drivers' Championships: 0

The Penske PC-27 was a CART racing car designed by John Travis and manufactured by Penske Cars in Poole, Dorset. The design was based around the team's 1997 car, the PC-26. It competed in the 1998 CART season and, as the PC-27B, in part of the 1999 season. In the 30 races that it took part in, its best finish was second at the 1998 Budweiser 500k in Japan. The PC-27 was the last CART racing car built by Penske, before the team switched permanently to customer chassis.

== Racing history ==
=== 1998 ===
The PC-27 made its debut at the first race of the 1998 season, the Marlboro Grand Prix of Miami Presented by Toyota, Unser Jr retired with a broken transmission and Ribeiro finished 17th. Both drivers finished the Budweiser 500k, The American second and the Brazilian ninth. Both drivers retired at the Toyota Grand Prix of Long Beach, Unser Jr had contact with Hélio Castroneves and Ribeiro with an oil leak. The Brazilian failed to qualify for the Bosch Spark Plug Grand Prix Presented by Toyota and the American finished 15th. Both drivers retired at the Rio 400, Unser Jr with engine failure and Ribeiro with a broken transmission. For the second race in a row, both drivers retired. it was the Motorola 300, the American had contact and the Brazilian with a broken transmission. Both drivers finished the Miller 200, Unser Jr 3rd and Ribeiro 18th. The American retired with a broken transmission at the ITT Automotive Detroit Grand Prix and the Brazilian finished 16th. Both drivers finished the Budweiser/G. I. Joe's 200 Presented by Texaco/Havoline, Unser Jr finish fifth and Ribeiro 15th despite stopping with three laps to go with a broken transmission. The American finished 17th despite stopping with four laps to go with a broken shift linkage at the Medic Drug Grand Prix of Cleveland Presented by Star Bank and the Brazilian retired with a broken transmission, Unser Jr finished 17th despite a collision with Gualter Salles at the hairpin at the Molson Indy Toronto and Ribeiro retired with a broken transmission. Oil leaks put both drivers out of the U.S. 500 Presented by Toyota. Both drivers finished the Miller Lite 200, the American sixth and the Brazilian tenth. Both drivers retired at the Chicago Tribune Presents Texaco/Havoline 200, Unser Jr had contact with Patrick Carpentier and Ribeiro with engine failure. Both drivers finished the Molson Indy Vancouver, the American fifth and the Brazilian seventh. The second race in a row both drivers finished a race, The Honda Grand Prix of Monterey Featuring the Texaco/Havoline 300, Unser Jr sixth and Ribeiro 14th. The third race in a row both drivers finished a race, The Texaco Grand Prix of Houston, the American seventh and the Brazilian 17th. The fourth race in a row both drivers finished a race, The Honda Indy 300, Unser Jr 22nd and Ribeiro 13th. Both drivers retired at the final round of the 1998 season, the Marlboro 500 presented by Toyota, the Brazilian had contact and the American with an oil leak.

=== 1999 ===
The team modified the PC-27 into the Penske PC-27B and Unser Jr stayed with the team but Penske ran one car for most of the 1999 season as Ribero retired in February 1999. The first race of the season was the Marlboro Grand Prix of Miami Presented by Toyota, Unser Jr crashed and broke his leg. He was replaced by Brazilian Tarso Marques for the Firestone Firehawk 500K and finished 14th. The Brazilian retired at the Toyota Grand Prix of Long Beach after a collision with Hélio Castroneves and Scott Pruett. Unser Jr returned for the Bosch Spark Plug Grand Prix Presented by Toyota but retired with a crash. Two PC-27Bs were entered for the American and the Brazilian for the Grand Prix Telemar Rio 200, with Marques finishing ninth and Unser Jr 12th. Before the Motorola 300 Unser Jr used the Lola B99/00, Marquez continued to use the PC-27B but retired with a crash. The team ran the B99/00 for the next five races: (Miller Lite 225 Presented by Kmart, Texaco/Havoline Presents Budweiser/G.I. Joe's 200, Medic Drug Grand Prix of Cleveland Presented by Firstar, The Chicago Tribune Presents Texaco/Havoline 200 and the Molson Indy Toronto. The PC-27B returned at the U.S. 500 Presented by Toyota with two PC-27Bs entered for Unser Jr and American Alex Barron; engine failures put both drivers out of the race. The team ran the B99/00 for the next five races: (Tenneco Automotive Grand Prix of Detroit, Miller Lite 200, Target Grand Prix Presented by Shell, Molson Indy Vancouver and the Honda Grand Prix of Monterey Featuring The Shell 300). The PC-27B returned at the Texaco/Havoline Grand Prix of Houston with only Unser Jr and finished 15th. Mechanical problems put the American out of the Honda Indy 300. Two PC-27Bs were entered for Unser Jr and Barron for the final round of the 1999 season, the Marlboro 500, Unser Jr finished seventh and Barron retired when he crashed.

== Complete CART World Series results ==
(key) (Results in bold indicate pole position; results in italics indicate fastest lap)

Year	Entrant	Chassis	Engine	Tyres	Driver	No.	1	2	3	4	5	6	7	8	9	10	11	12	13	14	15	16	17	18	19	20	Points	D.C.
1998	Marlboro Team Penske	PC-27	Mercedes-Benz IC108E V8t	G			MIA	MOT	LBH	NAZ	RIO	GAT	MIL	DET	POR	CLE	TOR	MCH	MDO	ROA	VAN	LAG	HOU	SFR	FON			
1998	Marlboro Team Penske	PC-27	Mercedes-Benz IC108E V8t	G	(United States) Al Unser Jr.	2	Ret	2	Ret	15	Ret	Ret	3	Ret	5	Ret	17	Ret	6	Ret	5	6	7	22	Ret		72	11th
1998	Marlboro Team Penske	PC-27	Mercedes-Benz IC108E V8t	G	(Brazil) Andre Ribeiro	3	17	9	Ret	DNQ	Ret	Ret	18	16	15	Ret	Ret	Ret	10	Ret	7	14	17	13	Ret		13	22nd
1999	Marlboro Team Penske	PC-27B	Mercedes-Benz IC108E V8t	G			MIA	MOT	LBH	NAZ	RIO	GAT	MIL	POR	CLE	ROA	TOR	MCH	DET	MDO	CHI	VAN	LAG	HOU	SRF	FON		
1999	Marlboro Team Penske	PC-27B	Mercedes-Benz IC108E V8t	G	(United States) Al Unser Jr.	2	Ret			Ret	12							Ret						15	Ret	7	26^{1}	21st^{1}
1999	Marlboro Team Penske	PC-27B	Mercedes-Benz IC108E V8t	G	(Brazil) Tarso Marques	2		14	Ret																		4^{1}	27th^{1}
1999	Marlboro Team Penske	PC-27B	Mercedes-Benz IC108E V8t	G	(Brazil) Tarso Marques	3					9	Ret		18													4^{1}	27th^{1}
1999	Marlboro Team Penske	PC-27B	Mercedes-Benz IC108E V8t	G	(United States) Alex Barron	3												Ret								Ret	4	27th

^1 Unser Jr and Marques scored points in the Lola B99/00.
