= Eagle 997 =

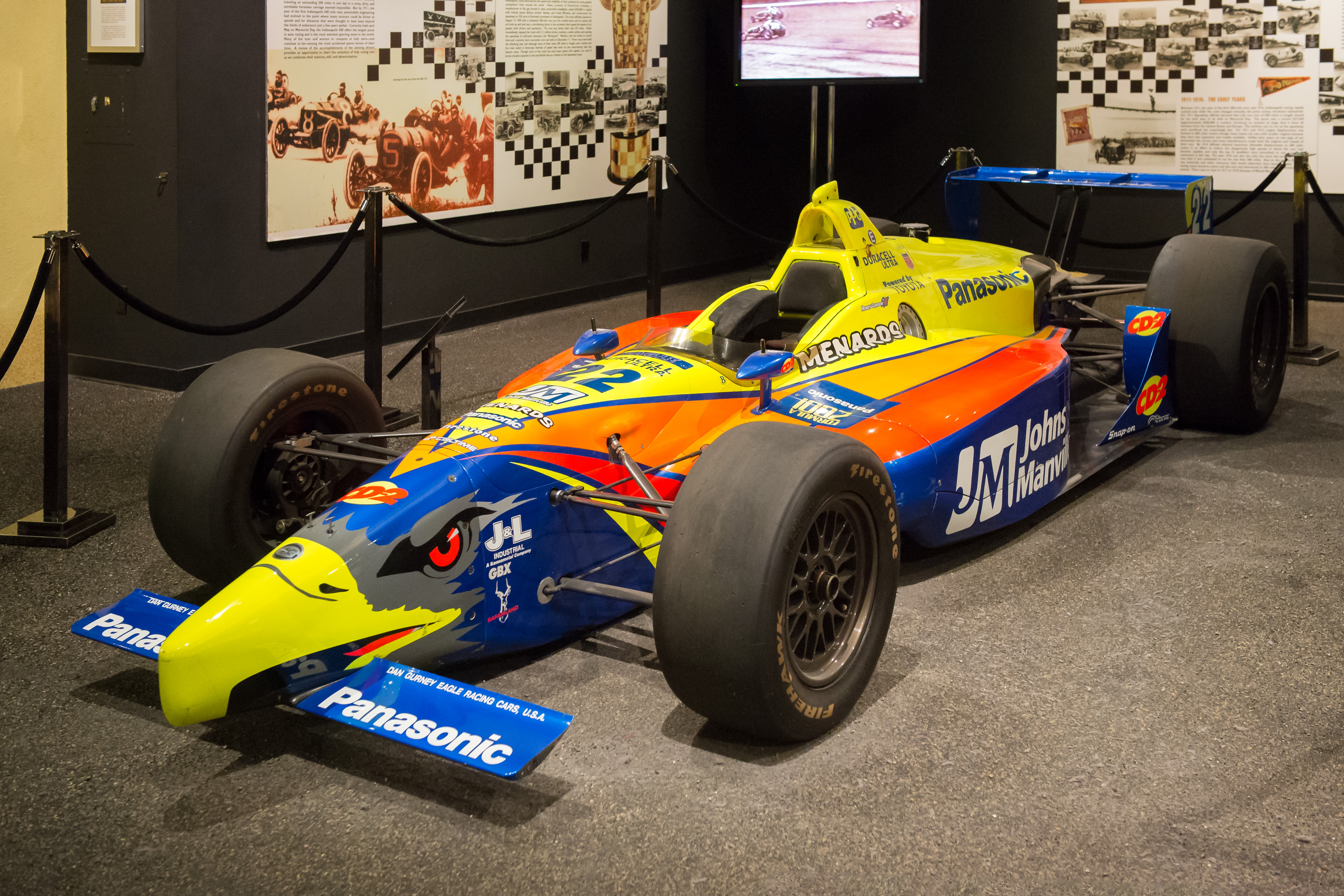
- Category: IndyCar
- Designer: Mark Page
- Predecessor: Eagle 987

Technical specifications
- Length: 4,830 millimetres (190.2 in)
- Width: 2,040 millimetres (80.3 in)
- Height: 940 millimetres (37.0 in)
- Wheelbase: 2,900 millimetres (114.2 in)
- Engine: Toyota RV8D and E 2,650 cubic centimetres (162 cu in) V8 Single Turbo Mid engine, RWD
- Transmission: Xtrac 6-speed Manual
- Power: 900 horsepower (912.5 PS; 671.1 kW) @ 10,300 rpm 625 newton-metres (461.0 lb⋅ft) @ 8,500 rpm
- Weight: 1,550 pounds (703 kg)
- Tires: Goodyear

Competition history
- Notable drivers: (United States) Alex Barron (Brazil) Gualter Salles (Brazil) Raul Boesel (Italy) Andrea Montermini
- Debut: 1999 Miami Grand Prix
- Last event: 1999 Marlboro 500
Entries	Races	Wins	Podiums
20	20	0	0
Poles	F/Laps	Titles	
0	0	0	
- Teams' Championships: 0
- Constructors' Championships: 0
- Drivers' Championships: 0

The Eagle 997 was the final built CART chassis by All American Racers. The car was used in the 1999 CART FedEx Championship Series and was primarily campaigned by All American Racers. Robby Gordon also used a privately entered Eagle 997 in select races in the later half of the 1999 season.

== Development history ==
The car would be the first CART/IndyCar race car to be designed using Computational fluid dynamics. This would lead to the car having significantly more down force then the other cars on the grid, the winning Reynard 99I of the year would make ~4,300 lb (1,950 kg) of down force at 200 mph (321.9 km/h), where as the 997 would produce 5,000 lb (2,268 kg) of down force at 200 mph (321.9 km/h). This would lead the car to be exceptionally good in the corners, but have extremely low top speed for its time, meaning that this car would have its top speed limited to 197 mph (317 km/h), versus the ~225 mph (362 km/h) of the aforementioned 99I, this lowered top speed would allow for significantly lower gearing for the car, meaning that even though it would be more than 0.3 seconds quicker to 60 mph (96.6 km/h) then the 99I, with the 997's 0-60 mph (96.6 km/h), with the 997 capable of 2.8 seconds to 60 mph (96.6 km/h), however that was only simulated, and it was capable of only around 3 seconds, meaning it was only 0.1 seconds quicker then the 99I which is a negligible difference because off the line performance rarely matters in rolling race starts which most Indycar races are.

== CART/Champ car results ==
Year	Tires	Drivers	No.	1	2	3	4	5	6	7	8	9	10	11	12	13	14	15	16	17	18	19	20	Ref
1999				MIA	MOT	LBH	NAZ	RIO	GAT	MIL	POR	CLE	ROA	TOR	MCH	DET	MDO	CHI	VAN	LAG	HOU	SRF	FON	
1999	G	(United States) Alex Barron	36	15	17	23	9	23	16	14														
1999	G	(Brazil) Gualter Salles	36								27	13	20	25	15	11	18							
1999	G	(Brazil) Raul Boesel	36															12					17	
1999	G	(Italy) Andrea Montermini	36																11	24	23	15		
