= Hawaiian Super Prix =

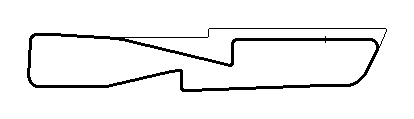

CART FedEx Championship
- Location: Hawaii; 21°18′26″N 158°04′13″W
- First race: 1999 (cancelled)
- Duration: Two 60-minutes periods

Circuit information
- Length: 1.800 mi (2.897 km)
- Turns: 11

The Hawaiian Super Prix was a proposed CART FedEx Championship Series exhibition race scheduled for Saturday November 13, 1999. It was to be the final race of the 1999 FedEx Championship Series season, as well as the season ending event for 2000 and beyond. It was to be held on a temporary circuit at the Kalaeloa Airport on the island of Oahu, near Honolulu, Hawaiʻi. The invitation-only event was to utilize an all-star format featuring the top drivers on the circuit. The organizers advertised a $10 million purse – including $5 million to the winner, the largest single-day payout in the history of motorsports to date.

25 days prior to its scheduled running, the race was cancelled by the promoters. Lack of revenue, poor decisions and missteps by management and series officials, and labor dispute involving local stevedores were cited as causes.

The failure of the Hawaiian Super Prix was a PR "black eye" for the CART series.

== Background ==
Indy car racing had never visited Hawaii before, but had achieved success with other events across the Pacific Ocean at Australia and Japan. Hawaii Raceway Park had been open since 1962, but no major stateside series had competed there. A history of outsiders and "carpetbaggers" coming to Hawaii to put on major events had made winning local support difficult. Hawaii was also considered by some to be hostile to outside businesses.

The promoters were optimistic that a major automobile series could host a successful race in Hawaii, despite the remote location, especially given the favorable economic climate of the late 1990s, and strong tourism industry. A crowd of up to 100,000 spectators was estimated, with over 20,000 coming from the mainland. Despite initial skepticism from city and state leaders, the event eventually gained local support. A potential of $80 million in tourist-based revenue helped gain support.

The idea for a major Hawaiian auto racing event began as early as 1993, with Dick Rutherford as the promoter. Rutherford had been involved with Indy car racing since 1971, a close friend of car owner U.E. "Pat" Patrick. He also ran the ARS series from 1986–1987.

A street course race was planned at Aloha Stadium, featuring an all-star format of drivers from several top disciplines, similar to the IROC format. The race was to be contested with Shelby Can-Am cars, and thirteen top drivers signed on to enter. However, it never turned a wheel.

Rutherford shifted his focus, and re-booted the idea around 1996. By 1998, he began leaking details about his plans, but had no firm location for the race, nor a sanctioning body on board. He eventually forged a partnership with the CART series, and moved ahead with the plans.

=== Announcement ===
The inaugural Hawaiian Super Prix was officially announced on February 25, 1999 at a press conference attended by Hawaii governor Ben Cayetano, CART chairman and CEO Andrew Craig, and Dick Rutherford, co-founder of the Hawaiian Super Prix. The race was scheduled for 1 p.m. HST (6 p.m. EST), Saturday November 13, 1999. Kalaeloa Airport was named as the venue. The initial contract called for a three-year deal.

Mario Andretti became the spokesperson for the event.

== Race details ==
Rutherford initially envisioned a large-scale, championship-style finale for the CART series, however, the Hawaiian Super Prix would not be a true, points-paying championship race. The actual points championship would be decided two weeks earlier at the Marlboro 500 at Fontana. The Super Prix would be a post-season invitation-only exhibition race, with large cash prizes the primary draw. With the regular season concluded, and no points on the line, the format encouraged more "all-out" racing.

The last time the CART series held a non-points all-star exhibition event was 1992, with the final running of the Marlboro Challenge. That event had run for six years, but was cancelled after waning popularity. A unique race format was planned for the Super Prix, similar to other non-points exhibition races, such as NASCAR's all-star race, The Winston. The sixteen-car field would be an invitation-only grid, with the top 12 drivers from the 1999 CART points standings, along with four at-large participants (possibily from Formula One and NASCAR).

=== Course ===
The proposed circuit was located at the Kalaeloa Airport (Barber's Point). The layout was a 1.800 mile (2.897 km), ten-turn, temporary course consisting of one of the airport's main runways and one of the taxiways. The course resembled a rectangular shape, with four 90° turns in each corner. A large fading kink with a sharp left/right series of turns was to be located on the start/finish straight, along with a quick right/left kink on the backstretch.

The wide nature of the track, particularly the backstretch, would resemble the characteristics of Cleveland, the popular race held at Burke Lakefront Airport.

In the months leading up to the scheduling running, portions of the course had already been repaved. The kinks/chicanes on the front and backstretch, as well as a long pit lane, had been constructed. Grandstand seating for a total of 50,000 spectators was planned along the lengths of both straights. In early demonstration tests, Mario Andretti and Maurício Gugelmin gave the course layout positive reviews.

=== Participants ===
The final official list of participants was never announced, however, according to the published plans, the field would have consisted of the following drivers:

| Pos | No. | Driver | Team |
|---|---|---|---|
| 1 | 4 | (Colombia) Juan Pablo Montoya | Chip Ganassi Racing |
| 2 | 27 | (United Kingdom) Dario Franchitti | Team KOOL Green |
| 3 | 26 | (Canada) Paul Tracy | Team KOOL Green |
| 4 | 6 | (United States) Michael Andretti | Newman/Haas Racing |
| 5 | 7 | (Italy) Max Papis | Team Rahal |
| 6 | 40 | (Mexico) Adrián Fernández | Patrick Racing |
| 7 | 11 | (Brazil) Christian Fittipaldi | Newman/Haas Racing |
| 8 | 5 | (Brazil) Gil de Ferran | Walker Racing |
| 9 | 12 | (United States) Jimmy Vasser | Chip Ganassi Racing |
| 11 | 44 | (Brazil) Tony Kanaan | Forsythe/Pettit Racing |
| 12 | 8 | (United States) Bryan Herta | Team Rahal |

The 10th-place driver in the final standing, Greg Moore was fatally injured in a crash at the Marlboro 500 at Fontana on October 31. The 13th-place driver, his Forsythe Racing teammate Patrick Carpentier, likely would have taken his spot.

The four "wild card", at-large spots could be filled at the promoter's option. Popular drivers outside the top 12 in points would be given first consideration. Candidates included Al Unser Jr., Scott Pruett, Robby Gordon, and several others. Early ideas included extending invitations to retired drivers, and former CART drivers participating in other disciplines (namely F1 drivers Jacques Villeneuve or Alex Zanardi). However, CART officials eventually vetoed the idea of an outsider coming in and potentially beating the series regulars.

One premise for the four at-large slots was to encourage teams and drivers that were outside of the running for the championship, to stay motivated and "race their way in" by performing well or even being victorious in the final race(s) of the regular season.

=== Race format ===
The event would be held over three days, with practice Thursday, time trials on Friday, and the race itself on Saturday. Time trials might have been done with a special "knockout" style format, a format adopted by IndyCar over a decade later.

The race was scheduled to have a unique three-hour, "twin race" format. The competition would consist of two 60-minute heats, with an hour-long half-time intermission. Points would be accumulated based on their finishing positions in each half. Bonus points would be awarded for the total number of cars passed and the fastest lap. The driver with the most combined points from the two heats would be declared the overall winner.

The drivers would be able to rest, and the pit crews would be able to work on the cars during the halftime break. The starting lineup for the second heat would be reverse finishing order from the first heat.

The halftime show was planned to be an elaborate, glitzy, star-studded entertainment program, along the lines of the Super Bowl. Along with popular music acts, an air show, a Hawaiian Tropic beauty contest, and a $1 million prize giveaway for a lucky television viewer were planned. A concert the night before was to feature LeAnn Rimes, Sugar Ray and Big Bad Voodoo Daddy.

=== Prize money ===
Perhaps the largest attention was given to the unprecedented $10 million advertised purse. Since no championship points would be awarded, prize money was the primary draw. The promoters announced a $10 million total purse, with $5 million going to the overall race winner. A bonus of $250,000 would go to the pole position winner, and another cash bonus would go to the driver who ran the fastest lap during the race.

Compared to other events at the time, the Hawaiian Super Prix would have the largest cash prize in motorsports history. The highest payout at the time in Indy car racing had come at the 1999 Indianapolis 500, which had a total purse of $9,047,150. The highest single payout belonged to Arie Luyendyk, who collected $1,568,150 from the 1997 race. The highest single payout for a CART-sanctioned race was the 1996 U.S. 500, where Jimmy Vasser collected $1,145,000.

The record in NASCAR at the time belonged to the 1999 Daytona 500. Race winner Jeff Gordon collected a prize of $2,172,246 (including a one million dollar bonus from the Winston No Bull 5) out of a total purse of over $9 million.

== Demise ==
Immediately after the race was announced on February 25, 1999, some experts and pundits in the industry were skeptical about its potential success, and some considered it "doomed from the start". Its late announcement would require an aggressive marketing campaign, as well as an accelerated schedule for logistical concerns. Poor marketing and the unpopular idea of televising the race on pay-per-view were contributing factors. However, the underlying reason for certain failure was the lack of revenue, in both sponsorship dollars and ticket sales.

=== Revenue and sponsorship ===
The promoters sought a title sponsorship deal, worth $5 million. However, the late announcement of the race meant that it was too late for most major potential advertisers to budget the funds necessary. Most corporate advertisers would ordinarily allocate their advertising budget months or even a year ahead of time. No major sponsor, even those already involved with the sport, stepped up to the event. The only sponsors that did sign on were mostly local advertisers, which collectively amounted to nowhere near the $5 million sought by organizers.

With the lack of interest among the corporate world, including advertisers already linked to the sport, skepticism about the well-being of the event began to grow.

=== Television coverage ===
In the 1999 season, CART races were covered on ABC and ESPN. Neither network was able to cover the race, due to conflicts with college football. The Hawaiian Super Prix thus did not have a television contract when it was announced, and promoters planned to air it on Showtime pay-per-view, which caused a considerable amount of controversy and complaints from fans who were unwilling to pay the expected $19.95 for the broadcast. Auto racing fans in general were not accustomed to watching events on PPV. The only races in recent history that were covered on PPV were a few NASCAR Winston Cup events at Pocono, for a brief time in 1986–1987, which was considered unsuccessful.

After months of growing uncertainty and internal research, Showtime dropped the rights to the event in September. Also creating a conflict was the upcoming pay-per-view coverage of the Holyfield–Lewis II match in Las Vegas, which was to occur the same day.

Eventually, a last-minute deal was made with Speedvision. At the time, it was available in only a small number of households. The deal, however, was never publicly announced prior to the cancellation of the event.

=== Poor promotion ===
From the time it was announced, the race was poorly promoted to the public. The CART marketing department did little if any in-house promoting, leaving race organizers and volunteers to fend for themselves. Further hurting the marketing efforts, ABC/ESPN refused to allow the producers the rights to video footage of their CART broadcasts, and did not acknowledge the existence of the Super Prix during their own telecasts since they were not going to cover the event.

=== Labor dispute ===
Further complicating the tight schedule was an untimely labor dispute and pending strike involving the local stevedores. Since nearly 90% of goods and materials are delivered to the state of Hawaii via ships, a labor slowdown was crippling to all industries. Though the union never went to a strike, they did conduct a work slowdown which put all shipments to the state considerably behind schedule.

Some of the materials needed to construct the course, particularly grandstands and catch fencing, arrived behind schedule, or never arrived at all. The aluminum needed for the bleachers sat dockside for two weeks before it was delivered to the site, and some of the other containers sat on a freighter still floating in the Pacific. Meanwhile, the catch fencing never left the mainland.

It was estimated that even if the event was not cancelled, since the labor dispute was not settled until October 25, that less than half of the grandstands would have been finished by race day. The cars and team equipment would arrive by air, in conjunction with series sponsor Fed Ex. However, if the course was not prepared, the safe arrival of the teams and drivers would be moot.

=== Ticket sales ===
Ticket sales were low, with fewer than 20,000 sold by the time the event was cancelled. A last-minute ad campaign called for $10 discounts on all seats, but it was too late to be effective. An infomercial ran on a local station, but subsequent reruns were cancelled when the event's finances started drying up.

=== Collapse ===
By late summer, the Super Prix had spent over $10 million in marketing and operational costs. At that point, they would not have enough money left to pay the advertised purse, the sanctioning fee, and final construction contract costs. It also would preclude them from an autumn "ad blitz" planned to help sell off the remaining tickets. It was not unusual for first-year races to operate in the red, but to start netting a profit in subsequent years. However, the serious financial peril of the Super Prix was starting to become evident to all parties involved.

The event was bonded for $30 million, which theoretically would have covered all the costs, despite low ticket sales, lack of sponsorship, and lack of television revenue. The event was underwritten by investment banking firm CNB Capital of New Hampshire. An insurance policy for $5 million through Frontier Insurance of Nashville was secured and payable to CART to cover the sanctioning fee.

CNB initially announced they would pay the policy. However, in early October, talks collapsed and the bank terminated the investment.

=== Cancellation ===
A last-ditch effort to find investors to bail out the event and secure working capital failed. They sought a $15 million high-interest loan to cover the costs of the prize money, and to complete the construction of the course. Even a plan to reduce the purse to $8 million and remove the "wild card" participants did nothing to change the situation. During a meeting on October 19, race organizers voted to cancel the event.

On the afternoon of October 19, the Hawaiian Super Prix released a statement, cancelling the race. David Grayson, president of HSP LLC, and general manager Phil Heard announced they had sent a letter to CART stating "HSP would not be able to meet its financial obligations to CART."

CART president Andrew Craig released a statement, "We are disappointed to have to make this announcement, however, the Hawaiian Super Prix has been unable to secure the necessary funding to make the required payment of the purse and other fees to CART."

== See also ==
The following Indy car races in modern times were also cancelled outright or were cancelled before completing an official distance:

- Five events from the 1980 USAC season (including a proposed race at Talladega Superspeedway) after schedule reorganization
- 1999 VisionAire 500K – race cancelled after 79 laps due to spectator fatalities
- 2001 Firestone Firehawk 600 – race cancelled due to driver safety concerns
- 2003 King Taco 500 – race cancelled due to the Old Fire
- The entirety of the 2008 Champ Car season (except Long Beach and Edmonton) due to unification with the IndyCar Series
- 2011 IZOD IndyCar World Championship – race cancelled after 11 laps due to the death of Dan Wheldon
- 2012 Indy Qingdao 600 – race cancelled by promoters
- 2016 Grand Prix of Boston – race cancelled by organizers due to disagreements with promoters
- Eight events from the 2020 IndyCar Series season due to the COVID-19 pandemic in the United States
