= 1999 ITT Automotive Detroit Grand Prix =

(United States) 1999 Detroit
Race details
- Race 13 of 20 in the 1999 CART season
- The Raceway on Belle Isle
- Date: August 8, 1999
- Official name: 1999 ITT Automotive Detroit Grand Prix
- Location: The Raceway on Belle Isle Park; Detroit, Michigan, Detroit, United States
- Course: Temporary street circuit 2.346 mi / 3.776 km
- Distance: 71 laps 166.566 mi / 268.096 km
- Weather: Dry with temperatures reaching up to 77 °F (25 °C); wind speeds up to 17.6 miles per hour (28.3 km/h)

Pole position
- Driver: (Colombia) Juan Pablo Montoya (Chip Ganassi Racing)
- Time: 1:13.585

Fastest lap
- Driver: (Colombia) Juan Pablo Montoya (Chip Ganassi Racing)
- Time: 1:15.701 (on lap 49 of 71)

Podium
- First: (United Kingdom) Dario Franchitti (Team KOOL Green)
- Second: (Canada) Paul Tracy (Team KOOL Green)
- Third: (Canada) Greg Moore (Forsythe Racing)

The 1999 ITT Automotive Detroit Grand Prix was the thirteenth round of the 1999 CART FedEx Champ Car World Series season, held on August 8, 1999, on The Raceway on Belle Isle in Detroit, Michigan. The race marks the 17th and final career podium for Greg Moore, who finished third.

== Report ==
=== Race ===
Championship leader Juan Pablo Montoya took his fifth pole of the season, and he dominated the early stages of the race, rapidly building a 6-second lead. Paul Tracy ran second early on, although it did not last for long as his teammate Dario Franchitti passed him. Franchitti was able to pull away from Tracy but had no answer for Montoya, whose lead was up to 10 seconds before a caution caused by a coming together between Robby Gordon and Jan Magnussen triggered the first round of pit stops, with the top three remained unchanged. Montoya continued to dominate once the green flag was brought out, although a miscommunication meant that he did not enter the pits when another caution period caused by Memo Gidley's car failure. The other drivers were all able to make their second stops and effectively gained a free pitstop on him. Montoya stayed out in an attempt to get as big a lead as possible once the track went green. He built a lead of 15 seconds before he made his pitstop, but rejoined only eighth, as Franchitti was handed the lead. Franchitti, despite more caution periods, went on to win the race ahead of teammate Tracy in another Team Green 1-2, with Greg Moore taking the final spot on the podium. The win handed Franchitti the championship lead as well, as Montoya was taken out of the race by Hélio Castroneves after the latter misjudged a restart attempt.

== Classification ==
=== Qualifying ===
August 7, 1999 - Qualifying Speeds
Grid	Driver	Team	Lap Time	Leader	Speed (mph)
1	(Colombia) Juan Pablo Montoya	Chip Ganassi Racing	1:13,585		114,773
2	(Canada) Paul Tracy	Team Green	1:13.611	+0.026	114,733
3	(Brazil) Gil de Ferran	Walker Racing	1:13.789	+0.204	114,456
4	(Scotland) Dario Franchitti	Team Green	1:13.792	+0.207	114,451
5	(Brazil) Roberto Moreno	Newman-Haas Racing	1:13.865	+0.280	114,338
6	(Brazil) Tony Kanaan	Forysthe Championship Racing	1:13.958	+0.373	114,195
7	(Canada) Greg Moore	Forsythe Racing	1:14.020	+0.435	114,099
8	(United States) Michael Andretti	Newman-Haas Racing	1:14.039	+0.454	114,070
9	(Canada) Patrick Carpentier	Forsythe Racing	1:14.090	+0.505	113,991
10	(Italy) Max Papis	Team Rahal	1:14.215	+0.630	113,799
11	(United States) Bryan Herta	Team Rahal	1:14.222	+0.637	113,788
12	(United States) Jimmy Vasser	Chip Ganassi Racing	1:14.355	+0.770	113,585
13	(Brazil) Mauricio Gugelmin	PacWest Racing Group	1:14.530	+0.945	113,381
14	(Brazil) Cristiano da Matta	Arciero-Wells Racing	1:14.753	+1.168	112,980
15	(United Kingdom) Mark Blundell	PacWest Racing Group	1:14.877	+1.292	112,793
16	(Uruguay) Gonzalo Rodriguez	Team Penske	1:15.034	+1.449	112,557
17	(United States) Scott Pruett	Arciero-Wells Racing	1:15.059	+1.474	112,519
18	(Brazil) Helio Castroneves	Hogan Racing	1:15.095	+1.510	112,466
19	(United States) Robby Gordon	Team Gordon	1:15.101	+1.516	112,457
20	(United States) Al Unser Jr.	Team Penske	1:15.495	+1.910	111,870
21	(United States) Richie Hearn	Della Penna Motorsports	1:15.650	+2.065	111,640
22	(Denmark) Jan Magnussen	Patrick Racing	1:15.749	+2.164	111,495
23	(Mexico) Michel Jourdain Jr.	Payton-Coyne Racing	1:15.807	+2.222	111,409
24	(United States) Memo Gidley	Payton-Coyne Racing	1:16.372	+2.787	110,585
25	(Brazil) Gualter Salles	All-American Racers	1:16.452	+2.867	110,469
26	(Japan) Naoki Hattori	Walker Racing	1:17.005	+3.420	109,679

=== Race ===
Pos	No	Driver	Team	Laps	Time/Retired	Grid	Points
1	27	(United Kingdom) Dario Franchitti	Team Green	71	2:02:24.662	4	20
2	26	(Canada) Paul Tracy	Team Green	71	+0.135	2	16
3	99	(Canada) Greg Moore	Forsythe Racing	71	+0.530	7	14
4	6	(United States) Michael Andretti	Newman-Haas Racing	71	+1.471	8	12
5	12	(United States) Jimmy Vasser	Chip Ganassi Racing	71	+2.594	12	10
6	44	(Brazil) Tony Kanaan	Forsythe Racing	71	+3.652	6	8
7	9	(Brazil) Hélio Castro-Neves	Hogan Racing	71	+4.802	18	6
8	24	(United States) Scott Pruett	Arciero-Wells Racing	71	+6.750	17	5
9	8	(United States) Bryan Herta	Team Rahal	71	+7.211	11	4
10	18	(United Kingdom) Mark Blundell	PacWest Racing	71	+8.230	15	3
11	36	(Brazil) Gualter Salles	All American Racing	71	+9.220	25	2
12	3	(Uruguay) Gonzalo Rodríguez	Team Penske	71	+14.473	16	1
13	10	(United States) Richie Hearn	Della Penna Motorsports	71	+15.831	21	
14	11	(Brazil) Roberto Moreno	Newman-Haas Racing	70	+1 Lap	5	
15	2	(United States) Al Unser Jr.	Team Penske	70	+1 Lap	20	
16	15	(Japan) Naoki Hattori	Walker Racing	70	+1 Lap	26	
17	4	(Colombia) Juan Pablo Montoya	Chip Ganassi Racing	68	Contact	1	1+1
18	20	(Denmark) Jan Magnussen	Patrick Racing	68	+3 Laps	22	
19	25	(Brazil) Cristiano da Matta	Arciero-Wells Racing	65	Contact	14	
20	71	(United States) Memo Gidley	Payton/Coyne Racing	42	Transmission	24	
21	19	(Mexico) Michel Jourdain Jr.	Payton/Coyne Racing	41	Transmission	23	
22	5	(Brazil) Gil de Ferran	Walker Racing	32	Contact	3	
23	33	(Canada) Patrick Carpentier	Forsythe Racing	27	Contact	9	
24	17	(Brazil) Maurício Gugelmin	PacWest Racing	27	Contact	13	
25	22	(United States) Robby Gordon	Team Gordon	23	Contact	19	
26	7	(Italy) Max Papis	Team Rahal	0	Contact	10	
DNS	40	(Mexico) Adrián Fernández	Patrick Racing		Injury		

== Caution flags ==
Laps	Cause
2-3	Carpentier (33), Papis (7) contact
24-27	Gordon (22), Magnussen (20) contact
29-33	Carpentier (33), Gugelmin (17) contact
34-35	de Ferran (5) contact
45-46	Gidley (71) stopped on course
64-65	Moreno (11), Montoya (4) contact
67-69	da Matta (25) contact, Unser Jr. (2) spin
70-71	Montoya (4), Castro-Neves (9) contact

== Lap Leaders ==
Laps	Leader
1-58	Juan Pablo Montoya
59-71	Dario Franchitti

Driver	Laps led
Juan Pablo Montoya	58
Dario Franchitti	13

== Point standings after race ==
Pos	Driver	Points
1	(United Kingdom) Dario Franchitti	136
2	(Colombia) Juan Pablo Montoya	131
3	(United States) Michael Andretti	119
4	(Canada) Paul Tracy	106
5	(Brazil) Christian Fittipaldi	101

Previous race: 1999 U.S. 500; Presented by Toyota	CART FedEx Championship Series; 1999 season	Next race: 1999 Miller Lite 200
Previous race: 1998 ITT Automotive; Detroit Grand Prix	Detroit Grand Prix	Next race: 2000 Tenneco Automotive; Grand Prix of Detroit
