= 1999 CART FedEx Championship Series =

American motorsport season

1999 CART season
- FedEx Championship Series

Season
- Races: 20
- Start date: March 21
- End date: October 31

Awards
- Drivers' champion: (Colombia) Juan Pablo Montoya
- Constructors' Cup: (United Kingdom) Reynard
- Manufacturers' Cup: (Japan) Honda
- Nations' Cup: Brazil
- Rookie of the Year: (Colombia) Juan Pablo Montoya

The 1999 FedEx Championship Series season was the twenty-first in the Championship Auto Racing Teams (CART) era of American open-wheel car racing. It consisted of 20 races, beginning in Homestead, Florida on March 21 and concluding in Fontana, California on October 31. The season was marred by the fatal accidents of Gonzalo Rodríguez during practice for the Laguna Seca round and Greg Moore at the final round, in addition to various injuries that took several drivers out of championship contention.

Juan Pablo Montoya, in his first CART season after two successful seasons in International Formula 3000, won the championship and the Rookie of the Year honors, the second and final driver to win both awards in the same season, after Nigel Mansell in 1993. The season ended in a tie, with Montoya and Dario Franchitti both having 212 championship points, though Montoya broke the tie-breaker due to having seven wins, over Franchitti's three.

With Al Unser Jr. running his final season in the series, 1999 was the last year in which the Al Unser name was on the CART grid. Also, this was the first season without Bobby Rahal on the grid. Mercedes-Benz scored their final pole and victory with Greg Moore at the season opener before they ended their participation in American open-wheel racing at the end of 2000.

== Constructors ==
The following teams and drivers competed in the 1999 CART Championship Series season. For the first time since 1987, Team Penske decided to use customer chassis, running Lola B99/00 cars alongside their own PC-27B.

| Team | Chassis | Engine | Tyre | No | Drivers | Races | Primary Sponsors |
|---|---|---|---|---|---|---|---|
| (United States) Marlboro Team Penske | Lola B99/00 | Mercedes IC 108E3 | G | 2 | (United States) Al Unser Jr. | 6–11, 13–17 | Marlboro |
| (United States) Marlboro Team Penske | Penske PC-27B | Mercedes IC 108E3 | G | 2 | (United States) Al Unser Jr. | 1, 4–5, 12, 18–20 | Marlboro |
| (United States) Marlboro Team Penske | Penske PC-27B | Mercedes IC 108E3 | G | 2 | (Brazil) Tarso Marques | 2–3 | Marlboro |
| (United States) Marlboro Team Penske | Penske PC-27B | Mercedes IC 108E3 | G | 3 | (Brazil) Tarso Marques | 5–6, 8 | Marlboro |
| (United States) Marlboro Team Penske | Lola B99/00 | Mercedes IC 108E3 | G | 3 | (Brazil) Tarso Marques | 9 | Marlboro |
| (United States) Marlboro Team Penske | Lola B99/00 | Mercedes IC 108E3 | G | 3 | (Uruguay) Gonzalo Rodríguez | 13, 17 | Marlboro |
| (United States) Marlboro Team Penske | Penske PC-27B | Mercedes IC 108E3 | G | 3 | (United States) Alex Barron | 12, 20 | Marlboro |
| (United States) Chip Ganassi Racing | Reynard 99i | Honda HRS | F | 4 | (Colombia) Juan Pablo Montoya | All | Target |
| (United States) Chip Ganassi Racing | Reynard 99i | Honda HRS | F | 12 | (United States) Jimmy Vasser | All | Target |
| (United States) Walker Racing | Reynard 99i | Honda HRS | G | 5 | (Brazil) Gil de Ferran | All | Valvoline |
| (United States) Walker Racing | Reynard 99i | Honda HRS | G | 15 | (Japan) Naoki Hattori | 1, 13–14, 16–20 | Alpine |
| (United States) Walker Racing | Reynard 99i | Honda HRS | G | 15 | (United States) Memo Gidley | 8–11 | Alpine |
| (United States) Newman/Haas Racing | Swift 010.c | Ford-Cosworth XD | F | 6 | (United States) Michael Andretti | All | Texaco-Havoline |
| (United States) Newman/Haas Racing | Swift 010.c | Ford-Cosworth XD | F | 11 | (Brazil) Christian Fittipaldi | 1–12, 18–20 | Big Kmart |
| (United States) Newman/Haas Racing | Swift 010.c | Ford-Cosworth XD | F | 11 | (Brazil) Roberto Moreno | 13–17 | Big Kmart |
| (United States) Team Rahal | Reynard 99i | Ford-Cosworth XD | F | 7 | (Italy) Max Papis | All | Miller Lite |
| (United States) Team Rahal | Reynard 99i | Ford-Cosworth XD | F | 8 | (United States) Bryan Herta | All | Shell |
| (United States) Hogan Racing | Lola B99/00 | Mercedes IC 108E3 | F | 9 | (Brazil) Hélio Castroneves | All | Hogan Motor Leasing |
| (United States) Hogan Racing | Lola B99/00 | Mercedes IC 108E3 | F | 21 | (Brazil) Luiz Garcia Jr. | 14, 16–17 | Tang |
| (United States) Della Penna Motorsports | Swift 010.c | Toyota RV8D | F | 10 | (United States) Richie Hearn | 1–5 | Budweiser |
| (United States) Della Penna Motorsports | Reynard 99i | Toyota RV8D | F | 10 | (United States) Richie Hearn | 6–20 | Budweiser |
| (United States) Bettenhausen Racing | Reynard 99i | Mercedes IC 108E3 | F | 16 | (Japan) Shigeaki Hattori | 2–4, 6–8, 11, 15, 17 | Epson |
| (United States) Bettenhausen Racing | Reynard 99i | Mercedes IC 108E3 | F | 16 | (Brazil) Gualter Salles | 5, 19 | Epson |
| (United States) PacWest Racing | Reynard 99i | Mercedes IC 108E3 | F | 17 | (Brazil) Maurício Gugelmin | All | Hollywood Cigarettes |
| (United States) PacWest Racing | Reynard 99i | Mercedes IC 108E3 | F | 18 | (United Kingdom) Mark Blundell | 1–4, 13–20 | Motorola |
| (United States) PacWest Racing | Reynard 99i | Mercedes IC 108E3 | F | 18 | (Brazil) Roberto Moreno | 5–12 | Motorola |
| (United States) Payton/Coyne Racing | Lola B99/00 | Ford-Cosworth XD | F | 19 | (Mexico) Michel Jourdain Jr. | All | Herdez |
| (United States) Payton/Coyne Racing | Reynard 99i | Ford-Cosworth XD | F | 34 | (United States) Dennis Vitolo | 1, 4, 6–7, 12, 15, 20 | NicoDerm |
| (United States) Payton/Coyne Racing | Reynard 99i | Ford-Cosworth XD | F | 34 | (Brazil) Gualter Salles | 3 | Refrigicent |
| (United States) Payton/Coyne Racing | Reynard 99i | Ford-Cosworth XD | F | 71 | (Brazil) Luiz Garcia Jr. | 1–3, 5, 8–10 | Tang |
| (United States) Payton/Coyne Racing | Reynard 99i | Ford-Cosworth XD | F | 71 | (United States) Dennis Vitolo | 11 | Tang |
| (United States) Payton/Coyne Racing | Reynard 99i | Ford-Cosworth XD | F | 71 | (United States) Memo Gidley | 13–14, 16–19 | Herdez |
| (United States) Patrick Racing | Reynard 99i | Ford-Cosworth XD | F | 40 | (Mexico) Adrian Fernández | 1–12, 17–20 | Tecate Beer |
| (United States) Patrick Racing | Reynard 99i | Ford-Cosworth XD | F | 40 | (United States) P. J. Jones | 14–16 | Tecate Beer |
| (United States) Patrick Racing | Reynard 99i | Ford-Cosworth XD | F | 20 | (United States) P. J. Jones | 1–2 | Visteon |
| (United States) Patrick Racing | Swift 010.c | Ford-Cosworth XD | F | 20 | (United States) P. J. Jones | 3–12, 20 | Visteon |
| (United States) Patrick Racing | Swift 010.c | Ford-Cosworth XD | F | 20 | (Denmark) Jan Magnussen | 13 | Visteon |
| (United States) Patrick Racing | Reynard 99i | Ford-Cosworth XD | F | 20 | (Denmark) Jan Magnussen | 14–19 | Visteon |
| (United States) Team Gordon | Swift 010.c | Toyota RV8D | F | 22 | (United States) Robby Gordon | 1–14, 19 | Johns Manville |
| (United States) Team Gordon | Eagle 997 | Toyota RV8D | F | 22 | (United States) Robby Gordon | 15–18, 20 | Johns Manville |
| (United States) Arciero-Wells Racing | Reynard 99i | Toyota RV8D | F | 24 | (United States) Scott Pruett | All | Pioneer |
| (United States) Arciero-Wells Racing | Reynard 99i | Toyota RV8D | F | 25 | (Brazil) Cristiano da Matta | All | MCI WorldCom |
| (United States) Team KOOL Green | Reynard 99i | Honda HRS | F | 26 | (Brazil) Raul Boesel | 1 | KOOL |
| (United States) Team KOOL Green | Reynard 99i | Honda HRS | F | 26 | (Canada) Paul Tracy | 2–20 | KOOL |
| (United States) Team KOOL Green | Reynard 99i | Honda HRS | F | 27 | (United Kingdom) Dario Franchitti | All | KOOL |
| (United States) Forsythe Racing | Reynard 99i | Mercedes IC 108E3 | F | 33 | (Canada) Patrick Carpentier | 1–13, 15–20 | Player's |
| (United States) Forsythe Racing | Reynard 99i | Mercedes IC 108E3 | F | 99 | (Canada) Greg Moore | All | Player's |
| (United States) Forsythe Championship Racing | Reynard 99i | Honda HRS | F | 44 | (Brazil) Tony Kanaan | All | McDonald's |
| (United States) All American Racing | Eagle 997 | Toyota RV8D | G | 36 | (United States) Alex Barron | 1–7 | Castrol |
| (United States) All American Racing | Eagle 997 | Toyota RV8D | G | 36 | (Brazil) Gualter Salles | 8–14 | Castrol |
| (United States) All American Racing | Eagle 997 | Toyota RV8D | G | 36 | (Brazil) Raul Boesel | 15, 20 | Castrol |
| (United States) All American Racing | Eagle 997 | Toyota RV8D | G | 36 | (Italy) Andrea Montermini | 16–19 | Castrol |

== Schedule ==
| Icon | Legend |
|---|---|
| O | Oval/Speedway |
| R | Road course |
| S | Street circuit |

| Rnd | Date | Race Name | Circuit | Location |
|---|---|---|---|---|
| 1 | March 21 | (United States) Marlboro Grand Prix of Miami, presented by Toyota | O Homestead-Miami Speedway | Homestead, Florida |
| 2 | April 10 | (Japan) Firestone Firehawk 500K | O Twin Ring Motegi | Motegi, Japan |
| 3 | April 18 | (United States) Toyota Grand Prix of Long Beach | S Streets of Long Beach | Long Beach, California |
| 4 | May 2 | (United States) Bosch Spark Plug Grand Prix | O Nazareth Speedway | Nazareth, Pennsylvania |
| 5 | May 15 | (Brazil) Telemar Rio 200 | O Autódromo de Jacarepaguá | Rio de Janeiro, Brazil |
| 6 | May 29 | (United States) Motorola 300 | O Gateway International Raceway | Madison, Illinois |
| 7 | June 6 | (United States) Miller Lite 225 | O Milwaukee Mile | West Allis, Wisconsin |
| 8 | June 20 | (United States) Budweiser/G. I. Joe's 200 | R Portland International Raceway | Portland, Oregon |
| 9 | June 27 | (United States) Medic Drug Grand Prix of Cleveland | R Cleveland Burke Lakefront Airport | Cleveland, Ohio |
| 10 | July 11 | (United States) Texaco/Havoline 200 | R Road America | Elkhart Lake, Wisconsin |
| 11 | July 18 | (Canada) Molson Indy Toronto | S Exhibition Place | Toronto, Ontario |
| 12 | July 25 | (United States) U.S. 500 | O Michigan Speedway | Brooklyn, Michigan |
| 13 | August 8 | (United States) Tenneco Automotive Grand Prix of Detroit | S The Raceway on Belle Isle Park | Detroit, Michigan |
| 14 | August 15 | (United States) Miller Lite 200 | R Mid-Ohio Sports Car Course | Lexington, Ohio |
| 15 | August 22 | (United States) Target Grand Prix of Chicago | O Chicago Motor Speedway | Cicero, Illinois |
| 16 | September 5 | (Canada) Molson Indy Vancouver | S Concord Pacific Place | Vancouver, British Columbia |
| 17 | September 12 | (United States) Honda Grand Prix of Monterey, featuring The Shell 300 | R Laguna Seca Raceway | Monterey, California |
| 18 | September 26 | (United States) Texaco Grand Prix of Houston | S George R. Brown Convention Center | Houston, Texas |
| 19 | October 17 | (Australia) Honda Indy 300 | S Surfers Paradise Street Circuit | Surfers Paradise, Australia |
| 20 | October 31 | (United States) Marlboro 500 | O California Speedway | Fontana, California |

– Cleveland was scheduled for 211 miles, but was shortened due to the 2-hour time limit.
– Detroit was scheduled for 176 miles, but was shortened due to the 2-hour time limit.
– Vancouver was scheduled for 160 miles, but was shortened due to the 2-hour time limit.

== Results ==
| Round | Race | Pole position | Fastest lap | Race Winner | | | | Race Time | Report |
| Round | Race | Pole position | Fastest lap | Driver | Team | Chassis | Engine | Race Time | Report |
|---|---|---|---|---|---|---|---|---|---|
| 1 | (United States) Homestead | (Canada) Greg Moore | (United Kingdom) Dario Franchitti | (Canada) Greg Moore | Forsythe Racing | Reynard | Mercedes | 1:38:54 | Report |
| 2 | (Japan) Motegi | (Brazil) Gil de Ferran | (Brazil) Hélio Castroneves | (Mexico) Adrián Fernández | Patrick Racing | Reynard | Ford | 1:46:01 | Report |
| 3 | (United States) Long Beach | (Brazil) Tony Kanaan | (Colombia) Juan Pablo Montoya | (Colombia) Juan Pablo Montoya | Chip Ganassi Racing | Reynard | Honda | 1:45:48 | Report |
| 4 | (United States) Nazareth | (Colombia) Juan Pablo Montoya | (Brazil) Hélio Castroneves | (Colombia) Juan Pablo Montoya | Chip Ganassi Racing | Reynard | Honda | 1:46:13 | Report |
| 5 | (Brazil) Rio | (Brazil) Christian Fittipaldi | (Colombia) Juan Pablo Montoya | (Colombia) Juan Pablo Montoya | Chip Ganassi Racing | Reynard | Honda | 1:36:32 | Report |
| 6 | (United States) Gateway | (Colombia) Juan Pablo Montoya | (Brazil) Hélio Castroneves | (United States) Michael Andretti | Newman/Haas Racing | Swift 010.c | Ford | 2:25:35 | Report |
| 7 | (United States) Milwaukee | (Brazil) Hélio Castroneves | (Brazil) Hélio Castroneves | (Canada) Paul Tracy | Team KOOL Green | Reynard | Honda | 1:48:49 | Report |
| 8 | (United States) Portland | (Colombia) Juan Pablo Montoya | (United States) Michael Andretti | (Brazil) Gil de Ferran | Walker Racing | Reynard | Honda | 1:47:44 | Report |
| 9 | (United States) Cleveland | (Colombia) Juan Pablo Montoya | (Brazil) Gil de Ferran | (Colombia) Juan Pablo Montoya | Chip Ganassi Racing | Reynard | Honda | 2:01:04 | Report |
| 10 | (United States) Road America | (United States) Michael Andretti | (Brazil) Hélio Castroneves | (Brazil) Christian Fittipaldi | Newman/Haas Racing | Swift 010.c | Ford | 1:37:00 | Report |
| 11 | (Canada) Toronto | (Brazil) Gil de Ferran | (United Kingdom) Dario Franchitti | (United Kingdom) Dario Franchitti | Team KOOL Green | Reynard | Honda | 1:56:27 | Report |
| 12 | (United States) U.S. 500 | (United States) Jimmy Vasser | (United States) Jimmy Vasser | (Brazil) Tony Kanaan | Forsythe Racing | Reynard | Honda | 2:41:42 | Report |
| 13 | (United States) Belle Isle | (Colombia) Juan Pablo Montoya | (Colombia) Juan Pablo Montoya | (United Kingdom) Dario Franchitti | Team KOOL Green | Reynard | Honda | 2:02:24 | Report |
| 14 | (United States) Mid-Ohio | (United Kingdom) Dario Franchitti | (Colombia) Juan Pablo Montoya | (Colombia) Juan Pablo Montoya | Chip Ganassi Racing | Reynard | Honda | 1:42:08 | Report |
| 15 | (United States) Chicago | (Italy) Max Papis | (Brazil) Roberto Moreno | (Colombia) Juan Pablo Montoya | Chip Ganassi Racing | Reynard | Honda | 1:53:38 | Report |
| 16 | (Canada) Vancouver | (Colombia) Juan Pablo Montoya | (Colombia) Juan Pablo Montoya | (Colombia) Juan Pablo Montoya | Chip Ganassi Racing | Reynard | Honda | 2:01:08 | Report |
| 17 | (United States) Laguna Seca | (United States) Bryan Herta | (Brazil) Tony Kanaan | (United States) Bryan Herta | Team Rahal | Reynard | Ford | 1:49:20 | Report |
| 18 | (United States) Houston | (Colombia) Juan Pablo Montoya | (Colombia) Juan Pablo Montoya | (Canada) Paul Tracy | Team KOOL Green | Reynard | Honda | 1:55:31 | Report |
| 19 | (Australia) Surfers Paradise | (United Kingdom) Dario Franchitti | (Italy) Max Papis | (United Kingdom) Dario Franchitti | Team KOOL Green | Reynard | Honda | 1:58:40 | Report |
| 20 | (United States) Fontana | (United States) Scott Pruett | (Brazil) Christian Fittipaldi | (Mexico) Adrián Fernández | Patrick Racing | Reynard | Ford | 2:57:17 | Report |
| NC | (United States) Hawaiian Super Prix | Event cancelled | | | | | | | |

Non-championship race

== Scoring system ==
Points were awarded to the top twelve classified drivers in every race, using the following system:

1999 CART Championship points system
| Positions | 1st | 2nd | 3rd | 4th | 5th | 6th | 7th | 8th | 9th | 10th | 11th | 12th |
| Points | 20 | 16 | 14 | 12 | 10 | 8 | 6 | 5 | 4 | 3 | 2 | 1 |

=== Final driver standings ===
| Pos | Driver | HOM (United States) | MOT (Japan) | LBH (United States) | NAZ (United States) | RIO (Brazil) | GTW (United States) | MIL (United States) | POR (United States) | CLE (United States) | ROA (United States) | TOR (Canada) | MIS (United States) | BEL (United States) | MOH (United States) | CMS (United States) | VAN (Canada) | LAG (United States) | HOU (United States) | SUR (Australia) | CAL (United States) | Pts |
|---|---|---|---|---|---|---|---|---|---|---|---|---|---|---|---|---|---|---|---|---|---|---|
| 1 | (Colombia) Juan Pablo Montoya RY | 10 | 13 | 1 | **1*** | 1* | **11** | 10* | **2** | **1*** | 13* | 22 | 2 | **17*** | 1 | 1* | **1*** | 8 | **25** | 16 | 4 | 212 |
| 2 | (United Kingdom) Dario Franchitti | 3 | 22 | 2 | 8 | 2 | 3 | 7 | 3 | 25 | 18 | 1* | 5 | 1 | **3*** | 2 | 10 | 25 | 2 | **1*** | 10 | 212 |
| 3 | (Canada) Paul Tracy | | 11 | 21 | 3 | 15 | 19 | 1 | 5 | 4 | 11 | 2 | 3 | 2 | 2 | 23 | 18 | 4 | 1* | 7 | 18 | 161 |
| 4 | (United States) Michael Andretti | 2 | 5 | 7 | 6 | 26 | 1* | 15 | 10 | 3 | **2** | 26 | 4 | 4 | 8 | 22 | 14 | 10 | 3 | 5 | 21 | 151 |
| 5 | (Italy) Max Papis | 5 | 16 | 9 | 13 | 4 | 5 | 13 | 8 | 16 | 5 | 5 | 7* | 26 | 5 | **4** | 23 | 3 | 4 | 2 | 2* | 150 |
| 6 | (Mexico) Adrián Fernández | 20 | 1* | 4 | 5 | 20 | 21 | 5 | 4 | 19 | 3 | 6 | 6 | Wth | | | | 5 | 12 | 3 | 1 | 140 |
| 7 | (Brazil) Christian Fittipaldi | 9 | 3 | 5 | 7 | **3** | 9 | 6 | 14 | 12 | 1 | 3 | 8 | | | | | | 7 | 25 | 3 | 121 |
| 8 | (Brazil) Gil de Ferran | 6 | **2** | 6 | 15 | 10 | 25 | 3 | 1* | 2 | 14 | **19** | 24 | 22 | 6 | 13 | 26 | 6 | 17 | 27 | 9 | 108 |
| 9 | (United States) Jimmy Vasser | 4 | 12 | 10 | 11 | 27 | 10 | 4 | 12 | 23 | 23 | 8 | **9** | 5 | 4 | 3 | 3 | 18 | 20 | 18 | 5 | 104 |
| 10 | (Canada) Greg Moore † | **1*** | 4 | 8 | 12 | 8 | 6 | 2 | 13 | 18 | 4 | 20 | 23 | 3 | 11 | 26 | 20 | 23 | 16 | 17 | 26 | 97 |
| 11 | (Brazil) Tony Kanaan | 21 | 6 | **22*** | 23 | 5 | 7 | 18 | 15 | 22 | 6 | 17 | 1 | 6 | 23 | 11 | 9 | 21 | 9 | 6 | 8 | 85 |
| 12 | (United States) Bryan Herta | 12 | 23 | 3 | 22 | 13 | 23 | 25 | 6 | 6 | 15 | 15 | 20 | 9 | 21 | 8 | 24 | **1*** | 5 | 4 | 14 | 84 |
| 13 | (Canada) Patrick Carpentier | 7 | 26 | 17 | 14 | 6 | 22 | 9 | 9 | 7 | 22 | 11 | 10 | 23 | | 6 | 2 | 9 | 19 | 24 | 25 | 61 |
| 14 | (Brazil) Roberto Moreno | | | | | 11 | 4 | 12 | 7 | 8 | 19 | 4 | 19 | 14 | 16 | 9 | 15 | 2 | | | | 58 |
| 15 | (Brazil) Hélio Castroneves | 17 | 9 | 19 | 21 | 25 | 2 | **26** | 26 | 26 | 16 | 27 | 25 | 7 | 7 | 5 | 8 | 26 | 26 | 21 | 20 | 48 |
| 16 | (Brazil) Maurício Gugelmin | 11 | 7 | 14 | 18 | 22 | 18 | 8 | 25 | 21 | 12 | 14 | 22 | 24 | 20 | 19 | 4 | 11 | 6 | 26 | 6 | 44 |
| 17 | (United States) P. J. Jones | 13 | 15 | 12 | 2 | 7 | 8 | 20 | 21 | 15 | 17 | 10 | 16 | | 15 | 7 | 21 | | | | 12 | 38 |
| 18 | (Brazil) Cristiano da Matta R | 14 | 25 | 20 | 4 | 21 | 17 | 11 | 11 | 20 | 21 | 24 | 17 | 19 | 9 | 14 | 5 | 22 | 11 | 13 | 23 | 32 |
| 19 | (United States) Scott Pruett | 22 | 21 | 15 | 10 | 24 | 14 | 17 | 24 | 17 | 25 | 7 | 14 | 8 | 17 | 20 | 13 | 7 | 10 | 9 | **22** | 28 |
| 20 | (United States) Robby Gordon | 19 | 8 | 16 | 19 | 14 | 27 | 24 | 17 | 9 | 8 | 13 | 26 | 25 | 10 | 10 | 22 | 19 | 21 | 8 | 11 | 27 |
| 21 | (United States) Al Unser Jr. | 26 | | | 24 | 12 | 12 | 19 | 16 | 5 | 9 | 9 | 13 | 15 | 25 | 25 | 25 | DNS | 15 | 22 | 7 | 26 |
| 22 | (United States) Richie Hearn | 23 | 10 | 11 | 20 | 19 | 13 | 21 | 22 | 10 | 10 | 16 | 12 | 13 | 12 | 16 | 6 | 16 | 8 | 23 | 27 | 26 |
| 23 | (United Kingdom) Mark Blundell | 8 | 24 | 13 | 17 | | | | | | | | | 10 | 13 | 21 | 19 | 12 | 24 | 19 | 16 | 9 |
| 24 | (Denmark) Jan Magnussen | | | | | | | | | | | | | 18 | 14 | 24 | 7 | 17 | 13 | 11 | | 8 |
| 25 | (Mexico) Michel Jourdain Jr. | 18 | 18 | 18 | 16 | 16 | 20 | 16 | 20 | 27 | 7 | 21 | 21 | 21 | 26 | 18 | 17 | 20 | 18 | 12 | 13 | 7 |
| 26 | (Brazil) Gualter Salles | | | 27 | | 17 | | | 27 | 13 | 20 | 25 | 15 | 11 | 18 | | | | | 10 | | 5 |
| 27 | (United States) Alex Barron | 15 | 17 | 23 | 9 | 23 | 16 | 14 | | | | | 18 | | | | | | | | 24 | 4 |
| 28 | (Brazil) Tarso Marques R | | 14 | 25 | | 9 | 26 | | 18 | 24 | | | | | | | | | | | | 4 |
| 29 | (United States) Memo Gidley R | | | | | | | | 19 | 11 | 26 | 12 | | 20 | 22 | | 12 | 13 | 14 | 14 | | 4 |
| 30 | (United States) Dennis Vitolo | 16 | | | DNS | | 24 | 22 | | | | 18 | 11 | | | 15 | | | | | 15 | 2 |
| 31 | (Italy) Andrea Montermini | | | | | | | | | | | | | | | | 11 | 24 | 23 | 15 | | 2 |
| 32 | (Brazil) Raul Boesel | 27 | | | | | | | | | | | | | | 12 | | | | | 17 | 1 |
| 33 | (Uruguay) Gonzalo Rodríguez † R | | | | | | | | | | | | | 12 | | | | DNS1 | | | | 1 |
| 34 | (Brazil) Luiz Garcia Jr. R | 24 | 19 | 24 | | 18 | | | 23 | 14 | 24 | | | | 24 | DNS | 16 | 15 | | | | 0 |
| 35 | (Japan) Naoki Hattori R | 25 | | | | | | | | | | | | 16 | 19 | | 27 | 14 | 22 | 20 | 19 | 0 |
| 36 | (Japan) Shigeaki Hattori R | Wth | 20 | 26 | Wth | | 15 | 23 | 28 | | | 23 | | | | 17 | | DNS | | | | 0 |
| Pos | Driver | HOM (United States) | MOT (Japan) | LBH (United States) | NAZ (United States) | RIO (Brazil) | GTW (United States) | MIL (United States) | POR (United States) | CLE (United States) | ROA (United States) | TOR (Canada) | MIS (United States) | BEL (United States) | MOH (United States) | CMS (United States) | VAN (Canada) | LAG (United States) | HOU (United States) | SUR (Australia) | CAL (United States) | Pts |

| Color | Result |
|---|---|
| Gold | Winner |
| Silver | 2nd place |
| Bronze | 3rd place |
| Green | 4th–6th place |
| Light Blue | 7th–12th place |
| Dark Blue | Finished (Outside Top 12) |
| Purple | Did not finish |
| Red | Did not qualify (DNQ) |
| Brown | Withdrawn (Wth) |
| Black | Disqualified (DSQ) |
| White | Did not start (DNS) |
| Blank | Did not participate (DNP) |
| Blank | Not competing |

**In-line notation**
| **Bold** | Pole position |
| Italics | Ran fastest race lap |
| * | Led most race laps |
| ^{†} | Fatal accident |
| RY | Rookie of the Year |
| R | Rookie |

Note:

- ^{1} Gonzalo Rodríguez died in qualifying at Laguna Seca Raceway after his car crashed into a barrier and flipped while trying to navigate the track's Corkscrew turn, suffering a fatal basilar skull fracture. He was 28 years old.
- ^{2} Greg Moore died in the season finale at California Speedway after a crash in the early laps. His car lost control coming off Turn 2, flipped over, impacted the inside wall, and flipped several more times. Moore suffered fatal head and internal injuries from the accident. He was 24 years old.

=== Nations' Cup ===
- Top result per race counts towards Nations' Cup.

| Pos | Country | HOM (United States) | MOT (Japan) | LBH (United States) | NAZ (United States) | RIO (Brazil) | GTW (United States) | MIL (United States) | POR (United States) | CLE (United States) | ROA (United States) | TOR (Canada) | MCH (United States) | BEL (United States) | MOH (United States) | CMS (United States) | VAN (Canada) | LAG (United States) | HOU (United States) | SUR (Australia) | CAL (United States) | Pts |
|---|---|---|---|---|---|---|---|---|---|---|---|---|---|---|---|---|---|---|---|---|---|---|
| 1 | Brazil | 6 | 2 | 5 | 4 | 3 | 2 | 3 | 1 | 2 | 1 | 3 | 1 | 6 | 6 | 5 | 4 | 2 | 6 | 6 | 3 | 264 |
| 2 | United States | 2 | 5 | 3 | 2 | 7 | 1 | 4 | 6 | 3 | 2 | 7 | 4 | 4 | 4 | 3 | 3 | 1 | 3 | 4 | 5 | 258 |
| 3 | Canada | 1 | 4 | 8 | 3 | 6 | 6 | 1 | 5 | 4 | 4 | 2 | 3 | 2 | 2 | 6 | 2 | 4 | 1 | 7 | 18 | 245 |
| 4 | Scotland | 3 | 22 | 2 | 8 | 2 | 3 | 7 | 3 | 25 | 18 | 1 | 5 | 1 | 3 | 2 | 10 | 25 | 2 | 1 | 10 | 207 |
| 5 | Colombia | 10 | 13 | 1 | 1 | 1 | 11 | 10 | 2 | 1 | 13 | 22 | 2 | 17 | 1 | 1 | 1 | 8 | 25 | 16 | 4 | 197 |
| 6 | Italy | 5 | 16 | 9 | 13 | 4 | 5 | 13 | 8 | 16 | 5 | 5 | 7 | 26 | 5 | 4 | 11 | 3 | 4 | 2 | 2 | 149 |
| 7 | Mexico | 18 | 1 | 4 | 5 | 16 | 20 | 5 | 4 | 19 | 3 | 6 | 6 | 21 | 26 | 18 | 17 | 5 | 12 | 3 | 1 | 139 |
| 8 | England | 8 | 24 | 13 | 17 | | | | | | | | | 10 | 13 | 21 | 19 | 12 | 24 | 19 | 16 | 9 |
| 9 | Denmark | | | | | | | | | | | | | 18 | 14 | 24 | 7 | 17 | 13 | 11 | | 8 |
| 10 | Uruguay | | | | | | | | | | | | | 12 | | | | Wth | | | | 1 |
| 11 | Japan | 25 | 20 | 26 | Wth | | 15 | 23 | 28 | | | 23 | | 16 | 19 | 17 | 27 | 14 | 22 | 20 | 19 | 0 |
| Pos | Country | HOM (United States) | MOT (Japan) | LBH (United States) | NAZ (United States) | RIO (Brazil) | GTW (United States) | MIL (United States) | POR (United States) | CLE (United States) | ROA (United States) | TOR (Canada) | MCH (United States) | BEL (United States) | MOH (United States) | CMS (United States) | VAN (Canada) | LAG (United States) | HOU (United States) | SUR (Australia) | CAL (United States) | Pts |

=== Chassis Constructors' Cup ===
| Pos | Chassis | Pts | Wins |
|---|---|---|---|
| 1 | (United Kingdom) Reynard 99I/98I | 424 | 18 |
| 2 | (United States) Swift 010.c | 241 | 2 |
| 3 | (United Kingdom) Lola T9900 | 69 | 0 |
| 4 | (United States) Eagle 997 | 13 | 0 |
| 5 | (United States) Penske PC-27B-99 | 10 | 0 |

=== Engine Manufacturers' Cup ===
| Pos | Engine | Pts | Wins |
|---|---|---|---|
| 1 | (Japan) Honda | 383 | 14 |
| 2 | (United States) Ford XB | 301 | 5 |
| 3 | (Germany) Mercedes | 193 | 1 |
| 4 | (Japan) Toyota | 80 | 0 |

=== Driver Breakdown ===
| Pos | Driver | Team | Entries | Wins | Podiums | Top 5s | Top 10s | Poles | Points |
|---|---|---|---|---|---|---|---|---|---|
| 1 | (Colombia) Montoya | (United States) Chip Ganassi Racing | 20 | 7 | 9 | 10 | 13 | 7 | 212 |
| 2 | (Scotland) Franchitti | (United States) Team KOOL Green | 20 | 3 | 11 | 12 | 16 | 2 | 212 |
| 3 | (Canada) Tracy | (United States) Team KOOL Green | 20 | 2 | 7 | 10 | 11 | 0 | 161 |
| 4 | (United States) Andretti | (United States) Newman-Haas Racing | 20 | 1 | 5 | 9 | 14 | 1 | 151 |
| 5 | (Italy) Papis | (United States) Team Rahal | 20 | 0 | 3 | 11 | 14 | 1 | 150 |
| 6 | (Mexico) Fernandez | (United States) Patrick Racing | 16 | 2 | 4 | 9 | 11 | 0 | 140 |
| 7 | (Brazil) Fittipaldi | (United States) Newman-Haas Racing | 15 | 1 | 5 | 6 | 12 | 1 | 121 |
| 8 | (Brazil) de Ferran | (United States) Walker Racing | 20 | 1 | 4 | 4 | 10 | 2 | 108 |
| 9 | (United States) Vasser | (United States) Chip Ganassi Racing | 20 | 0 | 2 | 7 | 11 | 1 | 104 |
| 10 | (Canada) Moore | (United States) Forsythe Racing | 20 | 1 | 3 | 5 | 8 | 1 | 97 |
| 11 | (Brazil) Kanaan | (United States) Forsythe Racing (United States) Team Rahal | 20 | 1 | 1 | 2 | 10 | 1 | 85 |
| 12 | (United States) Herta | (United States) Team Rahal | 20 | 1 | 2 | 4 | 8 | 1 | 84 |
| 13 | (Canada) Carpentier | (United States) Forsythe Racing | 19 | 0 | 1 | 1 | 9 | 0 | 61 |
| 14 | (Brazil) Moreno | (United States) Newman-Haas Racing (United States) Patrick Racing (United States) PacWest Racing | 13 | 0 | 1 | 3 | 6 | 0 | 58 |
| 15 | (Brazil) Castroneves | (United States) Bettenhausen Racing | 20 | 0 | 1 | 2 | 6 | 1 | 48 |
| 16 | (Brazil) Gugelmin | (United States) PacWest Racing | 20 | 0 | 0 | 1 | 5 | 0 | 44 |
| 17 | (United States) Jones | (United States) All American Racing (United States) Patrick Racing | 16 | 0 | 1 | 4 | 5 | 0 | 38 |
| 18 | (Brazil) da Matta | (United States) Newman-Haas Racing (United States) Arciero-Wells Racing (United States) PPI Motorsports | 20 | 0 | 0 | 2 | 3 | 0 | 32 |
| 19 | (United States) Pruett | (United States) Arciero-Wells Racing (United States) PPI Motorsports | 20 | 0 | 0 | 0 | 6 | 1 | 28 |
| 20 | (United States) Gordon | (United States) Team Gordon | 20 | 0 | 0 | 0 | 6 | 0 | 27 |
| 21 | (United States) Hearn | (United States) Della Penna Motorsports | 20 | 0 | 0 | 0 | 5 | 0 | 26 |
| 21 | (United States) Unser Jr. | (United States) Marlboro Team Penske | 17 | 0 | 0 | 1 | 4 | 0 | 26 |
| 23 | (United Kingdom) Blundell | (United States) PacWest Racing | 12 | 0 | 0 | 0 | 2 | 0 | 9 |
| 24 | (Denmark) Magnussen | (United States) Patrick Racing | 7 | 0 | 0 | 0 | 1 | 0 | 8 |
| 25 | (Mexico) Jourdain Jr. | (United States) Dale Coyne Racing | 20 | 0 | 0 | 0 | 1 | 0 | 7 |
| 26 | (Brazil) Salles | (United States) All American Racing (United States) Bettenhausen Racing | 10 | 0 | 0 | 0 | 1 | 0 | 5 |
| 27 | (United States) Barron | (United States) All American Racing (United States) Marlboro Team Penske | 9 | 0 | 0 | 0 | 1 | 0 | 4 |
| 27 | (Brazil) Marques | (United States) Marlboro Team Penske | 6 | 0 | 0 | 0 | 1 | 0 | 4 |
| 27 | (United States) Gidley | (United States) Dale Coyne Racing (United States) Bettenhausen Racing (United States) Walker Racing | 10 | 0 | 0 | 0 | 0 | 0 | 4 |
| 30 | (United States) Vitolo | (United States) Dale Coyne Racing | 7 | 0 | 0 | 0 | 0 | 0 | 2 |
| 30 | (Italy) Montermini | (United States) All American Racing | 4 | 0 | 0 | 0 | 0 | 0 | 2 |
| 32 | (Brazil) Boesel | (United States) All American Racing | 3 | 0 | 0 | 0 | 0 | 0 | 1 |
| 32 | (Uruguay) Rodríguez | (United States) Marlboro Team Penske | 1 | 0 | 0 | 0 | 0 | 0 | 1 |
| 34 | (Brazil) Garcia Jr. | (United States) Dale Coyne Racing (United States) Hogan Racing | 9 | 0 | 0 | 0 | 0 | 0 | 0 |
| 34 | (Japan) N. Hattori | (United States) Walker Racing | 8 | 0 | 0 | 0 | 0 | 0 | 0 |
| 34 | (Japan) S. Hattori | (United States) Bettenhausen Racing | 7 | 0 | 0 | 0 | 0 | 0 | 0 |

== Media ==
In the United States, CART continued its coverage on ESPN, but the broadcast booth changed voices. Paul Page handled lap-by-lap commentary, taking over for Bob Varsha, who had departed for Speed Channel. Newly-retired racer Parker Johnstone joined him with color commentary. During his suspension from the first race of the season, Paul Tracy joined Page and Johnstone in the booth. Jon Beekhuis and Gary Gerould were pit reporters.

== See also ==
- 1999 Toyota Atlantic Championship season
- 1999 Indianapolis 500
- 1999 Indy Racing League
- 1999 Indy Lights season

== Bibliography ==
- Shaw, Jeremy, ed. (2000). Autocourse Cart Official Champ Car Yearbook 1999-2000. Richmond, Surrey: Hazleton Publishing. ISBN 978-1-874557-44-9.
- Oreovicz, John (October 7, 2025). Class of '99: Triumph and Tragedy in the 1999 CART Indy Car Series. Octane Press. ISBN 978-1642341812.
