= 1999 Molson Indy Vancouver =

Coordinates: 49°16′34″N 123°6′24″W

(Canada) 1999 Molson Indy Vancouver
Race details
- Race 16 of 20 in the 1999 CART season
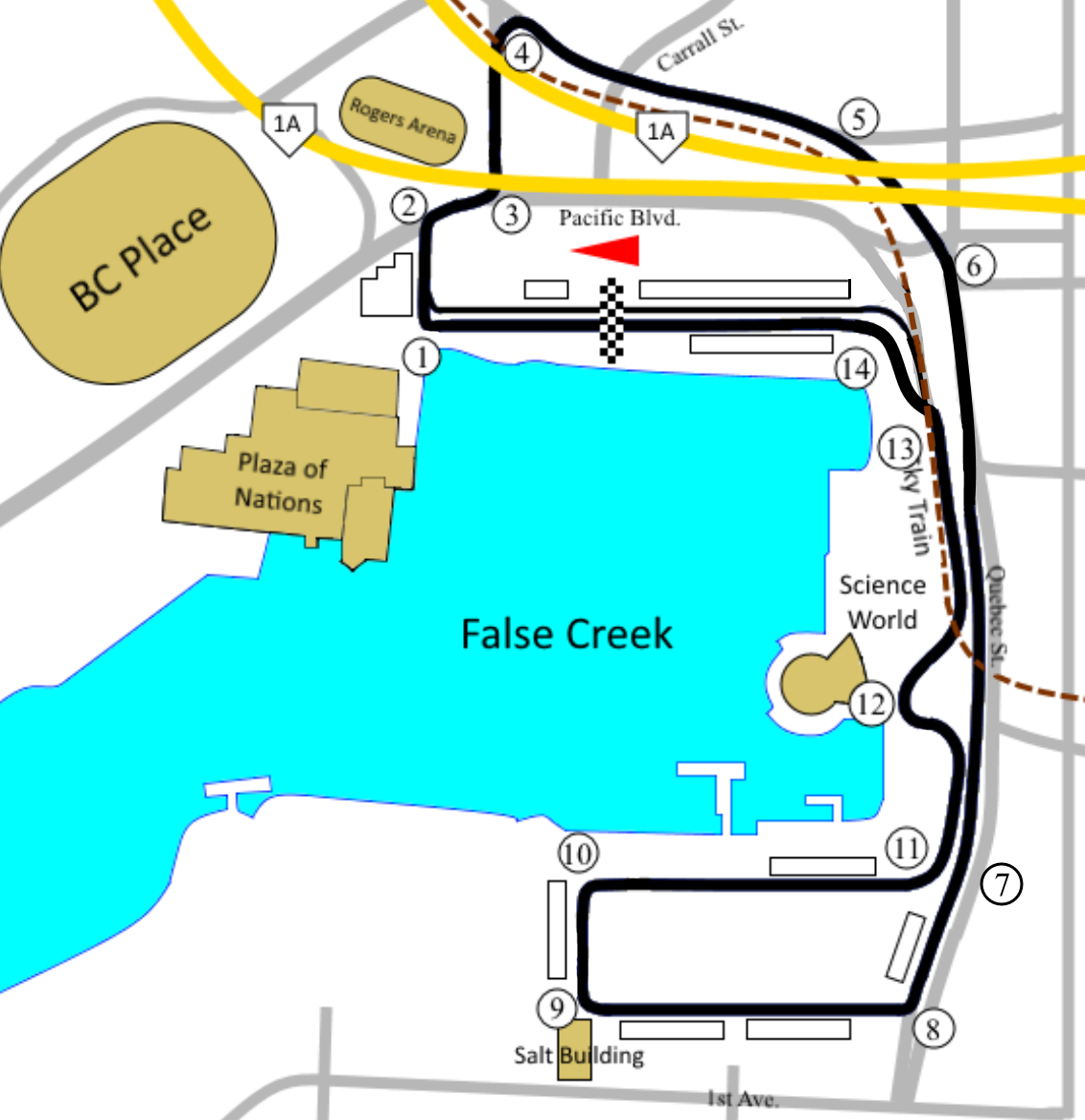
- Date: September 5, 1999
- Official name: 1999 Molson Indy Vancouver
- Location: Concord Pacific Place, Vancouver, British Columbia, Canada
- Course: Temporary Street Course; 1.780 mi / 2.865 km
- Distance: 74 (shortened from 90) laps 131.72 mi / 212.01 km
- Weather: Cloudy and wet with temperatures reaching up to 18.8 °C (65.8 °F)

Pole position
- Driver: (Colombia) (Colombia) Juan Pablo Montoya (Chip Ganassi Racing)
- Time: 1:00.641

Fastest lap
- Driver: (Colombia) Juan Pablo Montoya (Chip Ganassi Racing)
- Time: (on lap of 74 (shortened from 90))

Podium
- First: (Colombia) (Colombia) Juan Pablo Montoya (Chip Ganassi Racing)
- Second: (Canada) (Canada) Patrick Carpentier (Forsythe Racing)
- Third: (United States) (United States) Jimmy Vasser (Chip Ganassi Racing)

The 1999 Molson Indy Vancouver was a Championship Auto Racing Teams (CART) motor race held on September 5, 1999, at Concord Pacific Place in Vancouver, British Columbia, Canada. It was the 16th round of the 1999 CART season. Juan Pablo Montoya won the race from pole position and led nearly every lap en route to his seventh win of the season, followed by Patrick Carpentier and Jimmy Vasser.

Despite leading all but one lap during the race, Montoya was hampered by the wet racetrack and the pace of his championship rival Dario Franchitti; at one point, both drivers touched on track, spinning Franchitti out and ending his chances at winning the race. The race also saw multiple crashes as drivers struggled to navigate around the soaking wet racetrack.

== Qualifying ==
September 4, 1999 - Qualifying Speeds
Rank	Driver	Time	Leader	Speed (mph)	Team
1	(Colombia) Juan Pablo Montoya (R)	1:00.641	—	105.730	Chip Ganassi Racing
2	(United States) P. J. Jones	1:00.877	+0.236	105.321	Patrick Racing
3	(Canada) Paul Tracy	1:00.913	+0.272	105.258	Team Green
4	(Scotland) Dario Franchitti	1:00.952	+0.311	105.191	Team Green
5	(United Kingdom) Mark Blundell	1:00.957	+0.316	105.191	PacWest Racing
6	(Brazil) Roberto Moreno	1:00.976	+0.335	105.150	Newman-Haas Racing
7	(Brazil) Gil de Ferran	1:00.999	+0.358	105.110	Walker Racing
8	(United States) Michael Andretti	1:01.160	+0.358	104.833	Newman-Haas Racing
9	(Canada) Greg Moore	1:01.467	+0.826	104.310	Forsythe Racing
10	(Brazil) Maurício Gugelmin	1:01.483	+0.842	104.282	PacWest Racing
11	(Canada) Patrick Carpentier	1:01.483	+0.842	104.282	Forsythe Racing
12	(Italy) Max Papis	1:01.503	+0.862	104.249	Team Rahal
13	(United States) Bryan Herta	1:01.588	+0.947	104.105	Team Rahal
14	(United States) Scott Pruett	1:01.784	+1.143	103.774	Arciero-Wells Racing
15	(Brazil) Tony Kanaan	1:01.817	+1.176	103.719	Forsythe Racing
16	(United States) Jimmy Vasser	1:01.855	+1.214	103.655	Chip Ganassi Racing
17	(Brazil) Cristiano da Matta (R)	1:01.976	+1.335	103.453	Arciero-Wells Racing
18	(Mexico) Michel Jourdain Jr.	1:02.092	+1.451	103.260	Dale Coyne Racing
19	(United States) Robby Gordon	1:02.104	+1.463	103.240	Team Gordon
20	(United States) Memo Gidley (R)	1:02.337	+1.696	102.854	Dale Coyne Racing
21	(Denmark) Jan Magnussen	1:02.420	+1.779	102.717	Patrick Racing
22	(United States) Richie Hearn	1:02.522	+1.881	102.550	Della Penna Motorsports
23	(Japan) Naoki Hattori (R)	1:02.647	+2.006	102.345	Walker Racing
24	(United States) Al Unser Jr.	1:02.822	+2.181	102.060	Team Penske
25	(Italy) Andrea Montermini	1:03.306	+2.665	101.279	All American Racing
26	(Brazil) Luiz Garcia Jr. (R)	1:03.844	+3.203	100.426	Hogan Racing
27	(Brazil) Hélio Castroneves	No time		No speed	Hogan Racing

== Race ==
Pos	No	Driver	Team	Laps	Time/retired	Grid	Points
1	4	(Colombia) Juan Pablo Montoya (R)	Chip Ganassi Racing	74	2:01:08.183	1	22^{1}
2	33	(Canada) Patrick Carpentier	Forsythe Racing	74	+7.585	11	16
3	12	(United States) Jimmy Vasser	Chip Ganassi Racing	74	+7.964	16	14
4	17	(Brazil) Maurício Gugelmin	PacWest Racing	74	+13.043	10	12
5	25	(Brazil) Cristiano da Matta (R)	Arciero-Wells Racing	74	+14.001	17	10
6	10	(United States) Richie Hearn	Della Penna Motorsports	74	+14.292	22	8
7	20	(Denmark) Jan Magnussen	Patrick Racing	74	+15.243	21	6
8	9	(Brazil) Hélio Castroneves	Hogan Racing	74	+15.317	27	5
9	44	(Brazil) Tony Kanaan	Forsythe Racing	74	+16.665	15	4
10	27	(Scotland) Dario Franchitti	Team Green	74	+19.017	4	3
11	36	(Italy) Andrea Montermini	All American Racing	74	+34.018	25	2
12	71	(United States) Memo Gidley (R)	Dale Coyne Racing	74	+35.667	20	1
13	24	(United States) Scott Pruett	Arciero-Wells Racing	74	+39.281	14	—
14	6	(United States) Michael Andretti	Newman-Haas Racing	73	+1 Lap	8	—
15	11	(Brazil) Roberto Moreno	Newman-Haas Racing	71	+4 Laps	6	—
16	21	(Brazil) Luiz Garcia Jr. (R)	Hogan Racing	71	+4 Laps	26	—
17	19	(Mexico) Michel Jourdain Jr.	Dale Coyne Racing	64	Contact	18	—
18	26	(Canada) Paul Tracy	Team Green	59	Contact	3	—
19	18	(United Kingdom) Mark Blundell	PacWest Racing	59	Contact	5	—
20	99	(Canada) Greg Moore	Forsythe Racing	52	Contact	9	—
21	40	(United States) P. J. Jones	Patrick Racing	49	Contact	2	—
22	22	(United States) Robby Gordon	Team Gordon	41	Contact	19	—
23	7	(Italy) Max Papis	Team Rahal	39	Contact	12	—
24	8	(United States) Bryan Herta	Team Rahal	35	Contact	13	—
25	2	(United States) Al Unser Jr.	Team Penske	12	Contact	24	—
26	5	(Brazil) Gil de Ferran	Walker Racing	12	Contact	7	—
27	15	(Japan) Naoki Hattori (R)	Walker Racing	4	Brakes	23	—

- ^{1}– Includes two bonus points for leading the most laps and being the fastest qualifier.

== Race statistics ==
- Lead changes: 2 among 2 drivers

Lap Leaders
Laps	Leader
1–35	Juan Pablo Montoya
36	Paul Tracy
36-74	Juan Pablo Montoya

Total laps led
Leader	Laps
Juan Pablo Montoya	73
Paul Tracy	1

== Standings after the race ==
Drivers' standings

Pos	+/-	Driver	Points
1		(Colombia) Juan Pablo Montoya	194
2		(Scotland) Dario Franchitti	171
3		(United States) Michael Andretti	124
4		(Canada) Paul Tracy	122
5		(Brazil) Christian Fittipaldi	101

Previous race: 1999 Target Grand Prix of Chicago	CART FedEx Championship Series; 1999 season	Next race: 1999 Honda Grand Prix of Monterey
Previous race: 1998 Molson Indy Vancouver	Molson Indy Vancouver	Next race: 2000 Molson Indy Vancouver
