= 1999 Honda Grand Prix of Monterey =

CART FedEx Champ Car World Series race

(United States) 1999 Laguna Seca
Race details
- Race 17 of 20 in the 1999 CART season
- Mazda Raceway Laguna Seca
- Date: September 12, 1999
- Official name: 1999 Honda Grand Prix of Monterey
- Location: Mazda Raceway Laguna Seca; Monterey, California
- Course: Permanent road course 2.238 mi / 3.602 km
- Distance: 83 laps 185.754 mi / 298.966 km

Pole position
- Driver: (United States) Bryan Herta (Team Rahal)
- Time: 1:08.334

Fastest lap
- Driver: (Brazil) Tony Kanaan (Forsythe Racing)
- Time: 1:10.662 (on lap ? of 83)

Podium
- First: (United States) Bryan Herta (Team Rahal)
- Second: (Brazil) Roberto Moreno (Newman Haas Racing)
- Third: (Italy) Max Papis (Team Rahal)

The 1999 Honda Grand Prix of Monterey was the seventeenth round of the 1999 CART World Series season, held on September 12, 1999, at the Mazda Raceway Laguna Seca in Monterey, California. The event was marred when driver Gonzalo Rodríguez died after he was in a practice crash.

The race's winner was American driver Bryan Herta which made 7 career Poles (and of which was his last). This was Herta's 2nd and final victory in CART. Adrian Fernandez broke his wrist during the race but still managed to finish in 5th place.

== Race ==
| Pos | No | Driver | Team | Laps | Time/Retired | Grid | Points |
|---|---|---|---|---|---|---|---|
| 1 | 8 | (United States) Bryan Herta | Team Rahal | 83 | 1:49:20.898 | 1 | 20+1+1 |
| 2 | 11 | (Brazil) Roberto Moreno | Newman Haas Racing | 83 | +1.825 | 14 | 16 |
| 3 | 7 | (Italy) Max Papis | Team Rahal | 83 | +3.618 | 3 | 14 |
| 4 | 26 | (Canada) Paul Tracy | Team Green | 83 | +8.044 | 11 | 12 |
| 5 | 40 | (Mexico) Adrián Fernández | Patrick Racing | 83 | +15.741 | 7 | 10 |
| 6 | 5 | (Brazil) Gil de Ferran | Walker Racing | 83 | +16.489 | 9 | 8 |
| 7 | 24 | (United States) Scott Pruett | Arciero-Wells Racing | 83 | +17.305 | 8 | 6 |
| 8 | 26 | (Colombia) Juan Pablo Montoya | Chip Ganassi Racing | 83 | +17.865 | 16 | 5 |
| 9 | 33 | (Canada) Patrick Carpentier | Forsythe Racing | 83 | +18.346 | 15 | 4 |
| 10 | 6 | (United States) Michael Andretti | Newman Haas Racing | 83 | +18.846 | 5 | 3 |
| 11 | 17 | (Brazil) Maurício Gugelmin | PacWest Racing | 83 | +20.530 | 6 | 2 |
| 12 | 18 | (United Kingdom) Mark Blundell | PacWest Racing | 83 | +22.451 | 20 | 1 |
| 13 | 71 | (United States) Memo Gidley | Dale Coyne Racing | 83 | +33.751 | 22 | |
| 14 | 15 | (Japan) Naoki Hattori | Walker Racing | 83 | +54.231 | 25 | |
| 15 | 21 | (Brazil) Luiz Garcia Jr. | Hogan Racing | 82 | +2 Laps | 24 | |
| 16 | 10 | (United States) Richie Hearn | Della Penna Motorsports | 80 | +3 Laps | 26 | |
| 17 | 20 | (Denmark) Jan Magnussen | Patrick Racing | 69 | Transmission | 23 | |
| 18 | 12 | (United States) Jimmy Vasser | Chip Ganassi | 62 | Water leak | 13 | |
| 19 | 22 | (United States) Robby Gordon | Robby Gordon Motorsports | 56 | Crash | 18 | |
| 20 | 19 | (Mexico) Michel Jourdain Jr. | Dale Coyne Racing | 53 | Transmission | 19 | |
| 21 | 44 | (Brazil) Tony Kanaan | Forsythe Racing | 44 | Transmission | 2 | |
| 22 | 25 | (Brazil) Cristiano da Matta | Arciero-Wells Racing | 40 | Oil pressure | 17 | |
| 23 | 99 | (Canada) Greg Moore | Forsythe Racing | 32 | Transmission | 4 | |
| 24 | 36 | (Italy) Andrea Montermini | All American Racing | 31 | Crash | 21 | |
| 25 | 27 | (United Kingdom) Dario Franchitti | Team Green | 31 | Crash | 12 | |
| 26 | 9 | (Brazil) Helio Castroneves | Hogan Racing | 29 | Throttle cable | 10 | |
| DNS | 16 | (Japan) Shigeaki Hattori | Tony Bettenhausen Jr. | 0 | License revoked | 27 | |
| DNS | 2 | (United States) Al Unser Jr. | Team Penske | | Withdrew due to death of teammate | | |
| DNS | 3 | (Uruguay) Gonzalo Rodríguez | Team Penske | | Fatal practice accident | | |
