= 1999 Molson Indy Toronto =

1999 CART race held at Toronto, Ontario, Canada

(Canada) 1999 Molson Indy Toronto
Race details
- Race 11 of 20 in the 1999 CART season
- Exhibition Place track layout
- Date: July 18, 1999
- Official name: Molson Indy Toronto
- Location: Exhibition Place; Toronto, Ontario, Canada
- Course: Temporary Street Course; 1.755 mi / 2.824 km
- Distance: 95 laps 166.725 mi / 268.318 km
- Weather: Temperatures reaching up to 31 °C (88 °F); wind speeds up to 15 kilometres per hour (9.3 mph)

Pole position
- Driver: (Brazil) Gil de Ferran (Walker Racing)
- Time: 57.143

Fastest lap
- Driver: (United Kingdom) Dario Franchitti (Team KOOL Green)
- Time: 59.361 (on lap 88 of 95)

Podium
- First: (United Kingdom) Dario Franchitti (Team KOOL Green)
- Second: (Canada) Paul Tracy (Team KOOL Green)
- Third: (Brazil) Christian Fittipaldi (Newman-Haas Racing)

The 1999 Molson Indy Toronto was the eleventh round of the 1999 CART season and took place on July 18, 1999, at the 2.824-kilometre (1.755 mi) Exhibition Place temporary street circuit in Toronto, Ontario, Canada.

== Report ==
=== Race ===
Gil de Ferran took pole in qualifying by a considerable margin, but his lead did not last long as Dario Franchitti passed him at Turn 3 on the first lap. It was a lead which he did not relinquish. De Ferran ran second and Jimmy Vasser third early on. By lap 11, Helio Castroneves was out with a small engine fire. At about the same time, Michael Andretti ran into the back of Greg Moore pushing them both into the runoff area at turn 3, forcing Andretti to retire with suspension damage. The combination of incidents brought out a full course caution and the first round of pitstops as some backmarkers looked to make up track position by using alternate pit strategies. At the restart on lap 17, Franchitti got a great jump and pulled away from de Ferran easily. Further back, Tony Kanaan passed Paul Tracy for fifth in turn 1 with Juan Pablo Montoya also looking for a way around Tracy. Tracy and Kanaan would continue to battle until Tracy successfully retook fifth position two laps later in turn 3. Bryan Herta spun with 76 laps to go, also in the third turn, but only drew a local yellow. He would rejoin the race two laps down. Shortly before the leaders first pitstops, Christian Fittipaldi passed Vasser for third place. The top ten running order on the 28th lap was Franchitti, de Ferran, Fittipaldi, Tracy, Vasser, Kanaan, season points leader Montoya, Patrick Carpentier, Memo Gidley, and Scott Pruett.

Jimmy Vasser was the first of the leaders to come in for a pitstop, as he felt his rear tires were too worn to continue. As he left the pits, the full course caution came out due to a turn one incident between Richie Hearn and Cristiano da Matta, which was caused by an over eager Hearn lunging for 13th position and put his left front tire into the side pod of da Matta. This left only a single lane for the field to go through. At this point, Montoya was given a penalty and sent to the back of the field for running over an airgun hose from the pitbox in front of his. After the first pitstop, Roberto Moreno ran second behind Franchitti by following an alternate strategy (he had pitted during the first full course caution), but it meant that he had to make his second stop earlier than others. After the restart, Greg Moore was spun by Al Unser Jr. in turn 3 which brought a full course caution back out. After the subsequent restart, Vasser had to pit again for what he thought was a cut tire, but turned out to be significant buildup from the rubber "marbles" that had worn off everyone's tires. The order on lap 42 was now Franchitti still out front, followed by Moreno, de Ferran, Mauricio Gugelmin (Moreno's teammate and on the same alternate strategy), P. J. Jones, Fittipaldi, Tracy, Robby Gordon, Kanaan, and Adrian Fernandez who'd steadily worked his way into the top ten. Scott Pruett and Max Papis rounded out the points paying positions. Montoya had made up four places to retake 15th position, while his teammate Vasser languished at the tail end of the lead lap.

By the 57th lap, Franchitti had pulled nearly nine seconds clear of second placed Moreno, running a green flag race average of 102.188 mph. Both the PacWest cars of Moreno and Gugelmin would pit on this lap, giving up second and fourth places respectively. Polesitter de Ferran took second place during this exchange, but was 11.2 seconds behind Franchitti, with Fittipaldi another six seconds behind de Ferran. On lap 61, Montoya and Michel Jourdain Jr. got together in turn 4. The two tried to go side by side through 4, but Montoya pinched Jourdain into the concrete wall. Jourdain was turned by the wall into Montoya, who was launched a short distance through the air. Both cars ended up in the outside wall of turn 4 with suspension damage, race done.

Team Kool Green took advantage of the full course caution to bring in race leader Franchitti for a 12 second pitstop. Most of the other leaders, including de Ferran, Fittipaldi, and Franchitti's teammate Tracy, pitted as well. Tracy was able to get past Fittipaldi in the race to the pit exit line, putting him effectively third. De Ferran, however, clipped one of Fittipaldi's tires on his way out of the pits. He was sent to the back of the lead lap by CART officials. At the restart on lap 68, Tracy immediately passed Carpentier, who was second behind Franchitti, in Turn 1. Fittipaldi followed Tracy by Carpentier in turn 3, and Moreno also passed Carpentier in the same lap. While the lead cars strung out ahead, Max Papis and Tony Kanaan tried desperately to pass Carpentier, who was struggling with old tires. A short time later, Greg Moore retired with engine woes, while in the background, de Ferran locked up his brakes while trying to avoid a slow pack of cars entering turn 3. He spun and clipped the outside wall several times, ending his race.

At the restart, Fernandez took 6th place from Kanaan, but most other cars held station, as the marble buildup off racing line was becoming significant. With 8 laps to go, Franchitti was 2.7 seconds ahead of teammate Tracy, followed by Fittipaldi, Moreno, Papis, the charging Adrian Fernandez, Pruett, Kanaan, Gugelmin, and Unser Jr., who'd started 25th. The end of the race would see significant changes to the running order, however. In the final corner with three laps to go, Kanaan hit the wall and took himself out of the race. Gugelmin ended up in the runoff area at turn 3 and dropped from 9th to 14th. Jimmy Vasser moved from 12th to 8th in the final few laps to recover from what could have been a disastrous day. Franchitti and Tracy were unaffected by the action behind them, and delivered the first one-two finish for Team Kool Green in its history.

== Classification ==
=== Race ===
| Pos | No | Driver | Team | Laps | Time/Retired | Grid | Points |
|---|---|---|---|---|---|---|---|
| 1 | 27 | (United Kingdom) Dario Franchitti | Team Green | 95 | 1:56:27.550 | 2 | 20+1 |
| 2 | 26 | (Canada) Paul Tracy | Team Green | 95 | +2.624 | 6 | 16 |
| 3 | 11 | (Brazil) Christian Fittipaldi | Newman-Haas Racing | 95 | +6.987 | 5 | 14 |
| 4 | 18 | (Brazil) Roberto Moreno | PacWest Racing | 95 | +10.735 | 17 | 12 |
| 5 | 7 | (Italy) Max Papis | Team Rahal | 95 | +15.480 | 18 | 10 |
| 6 | 40 | (Mexico) Adrián Fernández | Patrick Racing | 95 | +22.903 | 23 | 8 |
| 7 | 24 | (United States) Scott Pruett | Arciero-Wells Racing | 95 | +24.256 | 11 | 6 |
| 8 | 12 | (United States) Jimmy Vasser | Chip Ganassi Racing | 95 | +33.394 | 4 | 5 |
| 9 | 2 | (United States) Al Unser Jr. | Team Penske | 95 | +35.109 | 25 | 4 |
| 10 | 20 | (United States) P. J. Jones | Patrick Racing | 95 | +36.015 | 20 | 3 |
| 11 | 33 | (Canada) Patrick Carpentier | Forsythe Racing | 95 | +36.478 | 12 | 2 |
| 12 | 15 | (United States) Memo Gidley | Walker Racing | 95 | +42.111 | 15 | 1 |
| 13 | 22 | (United States) Robby Gordon | Team Gordon | 95 | +48.163 | 22 | |
| 14 | 17 | (Brazil) Maurício Gugelmin | PacWest Racing | 95 | +51.827 | 16 | |
| 15 | 8 | (United States) Bryan Herta | Team Rahal | 93 | +2 Laps | 9 | |
| 16 | 10 | (United States) Richie Hearn | Della Penna Motorsports | 93 | +2 Laps | 21 | |
| 17 | 44 | (Brazil) Tony Kanaan | Forsythe Racing | 92 | Contact | 7 | |
| 18 | 71 | (United States) Dennis Vitolo | Payton/Coyne Racing | 82 | Transmission | 27 | |
| 19 | 5 | (Brazil) Gil de Ferran | Walker Racing | 71 | Contact | 1 | 1 |
| 20 | 99 | (Canada) Greg Moore | Forsythe Racing | 66 | Cooling | 10 | |
| 21 | 19 | (Mexico) Michel Jourdain Jr. | Payton/Coyne Racing | 59 | Contact | 19 | |
| 22 | 4 | (Colombia) Juan Pablo Montoya | Chip Ganassi Racing | 59 | Contact | 8 | |
| 23 | 16 | (Japan) Shigeaki Hattori | Bettenhausen Racing | 56 | Spun off | 26 | |
| 24 | 25 | (Brazil) Cristiano da Matta | Arciero-Wells Racing | 29 | Contact | 13 | |
| 25 | 36 | (Brazil) Gualter Salles | All American Racing | 25 | Engine | 24 | |
| 26 | 6 | (United States) Michael Andretti | Newman-Haas Racing | 11 | Contact | 3 | |
| 27 | 9 | (Brazil) Hélio Castro-Neves | Hogan Racing | 10 | Transmission | 14 | |

== Caution flags ==
| Laps | Cause |
|---|---|
| 13-17 | Moore (99), Andretti (6) contact |
| 31-35 | da Matta (25), Hearn (10) contact |
| 38-40 | Unser Jr. (2), Moore (99) contact |
| 61-67 | Jourdain Jr. (19), Montoya (4) contact |
| 72-76 | de Ferran (5) contact |

== Lap Leaders ==
| Laps / Leader; 1-95 / Dario Franchitti | Driver / Laps led; Dario Franchitti / 95 |

== Point standings after race ==
| Pos | Driver | Points |
|---|---|---|
| 1 | (Colombia) Juan Pablo Montoya | 113 |
| 2 | (United Kingdom) Dario Franchitti | 106 |
| 3 | (Brazil) Christian Fittipaldi | 96 |
| 4 | (United States) Michael Andretti | 95 |
| 5 | (Brazil) Gil de Ferran | 88 |
