= 1999 Grand Prix Telemar Rio 200 =

(Brazil) 1999 Rio
Race details
- Race 5 of 20 in the 1999 CART season
- Date: May 15, 1999
- Official name: 1999 Grand Prix Telemar Rio 200
- Location: Emerson Fittipaldi Speedway, Rio de Janeiro, Brazil
- Course: Permanent racing facility 1.864 mi / 3.000 km
- Distance: 108 laps 201.312 mi / 323.978 km
- Weather: Light rain

Pole position
- Driver: (Brazil) Christian Fittipaldi (Newman-Haas Racing)
- Time: 38.565

Fastest lap
- Driver: (Colombia) Juan Pablo Montoya (Chip Ganassi Racing)
- Time: 38.891 (on lap 107 of 108)

Podium
- First: (Colombia) Juan Pablo Montoya (Chip Ganassi Racing)
- Second: (United Kingdom) Dario Franchitti (Team KOOL Green)
- Third: (Brazil) Christian Fittipaldi (Newman-Haas Racing)

The 1999 Grand Prix Telemar Rio 200 was the fifth round of the 1999 CART World Series Season, held on May 15, 1999, on the Autódromo Internacional Nelson Piquet in Rio de Janeiro, Brazil. Christian Fittipaldi won his first and only Pole Position of his career.

== Report ==
=== Race ===
The race was delayed due to rain, and the drivers had to wait for the track to dry out. On the second attempt to start, Juan Pablo Montoya dived past front-row starters Christian Fittipaldi and Dario Franchitti to take the lead. The trio quickly pulled away from the rest of the field with Franchitti taking second from Fittipaldi at the first round of pit stops, only for Fittipaldi to reverse the order a few laps later by passing Franchitti on the track. Neither, despite staying within two seconds of Montoya, were able to give a serious challenge to him, the Colombian taking his third successive win. The battle for second eventually went to Franchitti who beat Fittipaldi with a quicker second pitstop.

== Classification ==
=== Race ===
Pos	No	Driver	Team	Laps	Time/Retired	Grid	Points
1	4	(Colombia) Juan Pablo Montoya	Chip Ganassi Racing	108	1:36:32.233	3	20+1
2	27	(United Kingdom) Dario Franchitti	Team Green	108	+1.736	2	16
3	11	(Brazil) Christian Fittipaldi	Newman-Haas Racing	108	+3.954	1	14+1
4	7	(Italy) Max Papis	Team Rahal	108	+4.930	13	12
5	44	(Brazil) Tony Kanaan	Forsythe Racing	108	+7.036	7	10
6	33	(Canada) Patrick Carpentier	Forsythe Racing	108	+7.618	9	8
7	20	(United States) P. J. Jones	Patrick Racing	108	+8.057	16	6
8	99	(Canada) Greg Moore	Forsythe Racing	108	+8.304	10	5
9	3	(Brazil) Tarso Marques	Team Penske	108	+10.688	8	4
10	5	(Brazil) Gil de Ferran	Walker Racing	108	+11.241	4	3
11	18	(Brazil) Roberto Moreno	PacWest Racing	108	+11.717	23	2
12	2	(United States) Al Unser Jr.	Team Penske	108	+12.215	19	1
13	8	(United States) Bryan Herta	Team Rahal	108	+14.138	5	
14	22	(United States) Robby Gordon	Team Gordon	108	+17.470	26	
15	26	(Canada) Paul Tracy	Team Green	108	+20.214	12	
16	19	(Mexico) Michel Jourdain Jr.	Payton/Coyne Racing	107	+1 Lap	24	
17	16	(Brazil) Gualter Salles	Bettenhausen Racing	107	+1 Lap	21	
18	71	(Brazil) Luiz Garcia Jr.	Payton/Coyne Racing	102	+6 Laps	27	
19	10	(United States) Richie Hearn	Della Penna Motorsports	101	Cooling	18	
20	40	(Mexico) Adrián Fernández	Patrick Racing	83	Contact	17	
21	25	(Brazil) Cristiano da Matta	Arciero-Wells Racing	81	Turbo	14	
22	17	(Brazil) Maurício Gugelmin	PacWest Racing	61	Cooling	25	
23	36	(United States) Alex Barron	All American Racing	58	Overheating	22	
24	24	(United States) Scott Pruett	Arciero-Wells Racing	49	Turbo	20	
25	9	(Brazil) Hélio Castro-Neves	Hogan Racing	32	Turbo	11	
26	6	(United States) Michael Andretti	Newman-Haas Racing	28	Engine	15	
27	12	(United States) Jimmy Vasser	Chip Ganassi Racing	23	Electrical	6	

== Caution flags ==
Laps	Cause
1	Field not aligned
30-36	Andretti (6) engine blow-up
50-55	Pruett (24) engine blow-up
85-90	Fernández (40) contact
91-95	Rain
98-102	Gordon (22), Jourdain Jr. (19) contact

== Lap Leaders ==
Laps	Leader
1	Christian Fittipaldi
2-72	Juan Pablo Montoya
73	Christian Fittipaldi
74-76	Dario Franchitti
77-86	Al Unser Jr.
87-108	Juan Pablo Montoya

Driver	Laps led
Juan Pablo Montoya	93
Al Unser Jr.	10
Dario Franchitti	3
Christian Fittipaldi	2

== Point standings after race ==
Pos	Driver	Points
1	(Colombia) Juan Pablo Montoya	66
2	(United Kingdom) Dario Franchitti	51
3	(Brazil) Christian Fittipaldi	49
4	(Canada) Greg Moore	45
5	(Mexico) Adrián Fernández	43
