= 1999 Miller Lite 200 =

(United States) 1999 Mid-Ohio
Race details
- Race 14 of 20 in the 1999 CART season
- Mid-Ohio Sports Car Course
- Date: August 15, 1999
- Official name: 1999 Miller Lite 200
- Location: Mid-Ohio Sports Car Course; Lexington, Ohio, United States
- Course: Permanent road course 2.258 mi / 3.634 km
- Distance: 83 laps 187.414 mi / 301.622 km
- Weather: Dry

Pole position
- Driver: (United Kingdom) Dario Franchitti (Team KOOL Green)
- Time: 1:05.347

Fastest lap
- Driver: (Colombia) Juan Pablo Montoya (Chip Ganassi Racing)
- Time: 1:06.788 (on lap 76 of 83)

Podium
- First: (Colombia) Juan Pablo Montoya (Chip Ganassi Racing)
- Second: (Canada) Paul Tracy (Team KOOL Green)
- Third: (United Kingdom) Dario Franchitti (Team KOOL Green)

The 1999 Miller Lite 200 was the fourteenth round of the 1999 CART FedEx Champ Car World Series season, held on August 15, 1999, at the Mid-Ohio Sports Car Course in Lexington, Ohio.

== Report ==
=== Race ===
Dario Franchitti, the championship leader took his first pole of the season after the Saturday qualifying was washed out due to rain, which meant that the grid was decided by Friday qualifying times. Franchitti led away at the start followed by Bryan Herta, although Paul Tracy soon passed Herta and took second. The Team Green duo of Franchitti and Tracy then pulled away from the field, building a lead of 12 seconds. After the first round of pit stops, Franchitti and Tracy stayed 1-2, but Juan Pablo Montoya was up to third after a quick stop. He was 15 seconds behind the Team Green cars, but he was unfazed by that and set about closing it down, and did so rapidly such that the top three cars were nose to tail before the second round of pit stops. Franchitti pitted, handing Tracy the lead, but that did not last for long as he was immediately passed by Montoya. Montoya and Tracy both made their second pit stops and both joined ahead of Franchitti before a caution due to Luiz Garcia Jr.'s spin bunched the field up. Tracy and Franchitti were quicker than anyone else on the track, but both were absolutely no match for Montoya, who set a stunning pace in the final stint once the track went green, and won by over 10 seconds. Tracy finished second and Franchitti third, which was enough for him to keep his championship lead, although it was down to 1 point.

== Classification ==
=== Race ===
Pos	No	Driver	Team	Laps	Time/Retired	Grid	Points
1	4	(Colombia) Juan Pablo Montoya	Chip Ganassi Racing	83	1:42:03.808	8	20
2	26	(Canada) Paul Tracy	Team Green	83	+10.927	3	16
3	27	(United Kingdom) Dario Franchitti	Team Green	83	+12.313	1	14+1+1
4	12	(United States) Jimmy Vasser	Chip Ganassi Racing	83	+14.728	5	12
5	7	(Italy) Max Papis	Team Rahal	83	+19.899	9	10
6	5	(Brazil) Gil de Ferran	Walker Racing	83	+23.682	6	8
7	9	(Brazil) Hélio Castro-Neves	Hogan Racing	83	+25.097	7	6
8	6	(United States) Michael Andretti	Newman-Haas Racing	83	+31.299	11	5
9	25	(Brazil) Cristiano da Matta	Arciero-Wells Racing	83	+31.877	14	4
10	22	(United States) Robby Gordon	Team Gordon	83	+32.822	10	3
11	99	(Canada) Greg Moore	Forsythe Racing	83	+33.262	25	2
12	10	(United States) Richie Hearn	Della Penna Motorsports	83	+35.317	12	1
13	18	(United Kingdom) Mark Blundell	PacWest Racing	83	+35.775	26	
14	20	(Denmark) Jan Magnussen	Patrick Racing	83	+43.215	15	
15	40	(United States) P. J. Jones	Patrick Racing	83	+43.694	21	
16	11	(Brazil) Roberto Moreno	Newman-Haas Racing	83	+44.565	19	
17	24	(United States) Scott Pruett	Arciero-Wells Racing	82	+1 Lap	20	
18	36	(Brazil) Gualter Salles	All American Racing	82	+1 Lap	16	
19	15	(Japan) Naoki Hattori	Walker Racing	82	+1 Lap	23	
20	17	(Brazil) Maurício Gugelmin	PacWest Racing	76	Engine	17	
21	8	(United States) Bryan Herta	Team Rahal	72	Engine	2	
22	71	(United States) Memo Gidley	Payton/Coyne Racing	69	Fire	13	
23	44	(Brazil) Tony Kanaan	Forsythe Racing	58	Fuel system	4	
24	21	(Brazil) Luiz Garcia Jr.	Hogan Racing	56	Clutch	24	
25	2	(United States) Al Unser Jr.	Team Penske	54	Contact	22	
26	19	(Mexico) Michel Jourdain Jr.	Payton/Coyne Racing	54	Transmission	18	

== Caution flags ==
Laps	Cause
60-65	Garcia Jr. (21) spin

== Lap Leaders ==
Laps	Leader
1-54	Dario Franchitti
55	Paul Tracy
56-83	Juan Pablo Montoya

Driver	Laps led
Dario Franchitti	54
Juan Pablo Montoya	28
Paul Tracy	1

== Point standings after race ==
Pos	Driver	Points
1	(United Kingdom) Dario Franchitti	152
2	(Colombia) Juan Pablo Montoya	151
3	(United States) Michael Andretti	124
4	(Canada) Paul Tracy	122
5	(Brazil) Christian Fittipaldi	101

Previous race: 1999 ITT Automotive Detroit Grand Prix	CART FedEx Championship Series; 1999 season	Next race: 1999 Target Grand Prix of Chicago
Previous race: 1998 Miller Lite 200	Miller Lite 200	Next race: 2000 Miller Lite 200
