= 1999 Motorola 300 =

(United States) 1999 Gateway
Race details
- Race 6 of 20 in the 1999 CART season
- Gateway International Raceway
- Date: May 29, 1999
- Official name: 1999 Motorola 300
- Location: Gateway International Raceway; Madison, Illinois, United States
- Course: Permanent oval course 1.25 mi / 2 km
- Distance: 236 laps 295 mi / 472 km
- Weather: Dry

Pole position
- Driver: (Colombia) Juan Pablo Montoya (Chip Ganassi Racing)
- Time: 25.014

Fastest lap
- Driver: (Brazil) Hélio Castro-Neves (Hogan Racing)
- Time: 26.180 (on lap 165 of 236)

Podium
- First: (United States) Michael Andretti (Newman-Haas Racing)
- Second: (Brazil) Hélio Castro-Neves (Hogan Racing)
- Third: (United Kingdom) Dario Franchitti (Team KOOL Green)

The 1999 Motorola 300 was the sixth round of the 1999 CART FedEx Champ Car World Series season, held on May 29, 1999, on the Gateway International Raceway in Madison, Illinois.

Michael Andretti was the winner.

== Report ==
=== Race ===
Juan Pablo Montoya, looking for a record-equalling fourth consecutive series win, led from pole in the early stages of the race from Paul Tracy. After a caution caused due to a crash by Tarso Marques, the leaders came in for stops, and Roberto Moreno led on an alternate pit strategy. Moreno led for a period of time and then pitted, handing Tracy the lead ahead of Michael Andretti, although the second period of stops reversed the order, whereas Montoya lost a lap and dropped out of contention after a fuel miscalculation. Andretti led until another caution came after Tracy and teammate Dario Franchitti collided while battling for second. This led to another round of stops from certain drivers, including Andretti, whereas Hélio Castro-Neves stayed out and took the lead. Castro-Neves led comfortably till lap 189 when the final round of pit stops took place. Castro-Neves, being on older tires and having his last pit stop well back had to put on new tires and more fuel, as did all behind him. Andretti and others who pitted on lap 152, did not have to put on new tires, and also required less fuel, resulting in a much faster stop. This meant that Andretti led after the stops, with Moreno up to second, and P. J. Jones in third. Both Castro-Neves and Franchitti took advantage of the newer tires to pass everyone in front of them and move up to second and third behind Andretti. Andretti, however, was able to hold them off and take his first win in over a year, with Castro-Neves settling for second and Franchitti third.

== Classification ==
=== Race ===
Pos	No	Driver	Team	Laps	Time/Retired	Grid	Points
1	6	(United States) Michael Andretti	Newman-Haas Racing	236	2:25:35.829	11	20+1
2	9	(Brazil) Hélio Castro-Neves	Hogan Racing	236	+0.329	3	16
3	27	(United Kingdom) Dario Franchitti	Team Green	236	+1.047	5	14
4	18	(Brazil) Roberto Moreno	PacWest Racing	236	+5.735	19	12
5	7	(Italy) Max Papis	Team Rahal	236	+10.977	13	10
6	99	(Canada) Greg Moore	Forsythe Racing	236	+11.203	6	8
7	44	(Brazil) Tony Kanaan	Forsythe Racing	236	+16.851	7	6
8	20	(United States) P. J. Jones	Patrick Racing	236	+25.769	16	5
9	11	(Brazil) Christian Fittipaldi	Newman-Haas Racing	236	+25.981	8	4
10	12	(United States) Jimmy Vasser	Chip Ganassi Racing	236	+26.531	10	3
11	4	(Colombia) Juan Pablo Montoya	Chip Ganassi Racing	236	+27.305	1	2+1
12	2	(United States) Al Unser Jr.	Team Penske	235	+1 Lap	24	1
13	10	(United States) Richie Hearn	Della Penna Motorsports	234	+2 Laps	25	
14	24	(United States) Scott Pruett	Arciero-Wells Racing	234	+2 Laps	20	
15	16	(Japan) Shigeaki Hattori	Bettenhausen Racing	229	+7 Laps	26	
16	36	(United States) Alex Barron	All American Racing	212	Electrical	23	
17	25	(Brazil) Cristiano da Matta	Arciero-Wells Racing	185	Engine	12	
18	17	(Brazil) Maurício Gugelmin	PacWest Racing	161	Fuel Pressure	21	
19	26	(Canada) Paul Tracy	Team Green	147	Contact	2	
20	19	(Mexico) Michel Jourdain Jr.	Payton/Coyne Racing	141	Electrical	22	
21	40	(Mexico) Adrián Fernández	Patrick Racing	132	Clutch	7	
22	33	(Canada) Patrick Carpentier	Forsythe Racing	114	Contact	4	
23	8	(United States) Bryan Herta	Team Rahal	113	Contact	17	
24	34	(United States) Dennis Vitolo	Payton/Coyne Racing	62	Handling	27	
25	5	(Brazil) Gil de Ferran	Walker Racing	36	Pit incident	15	
26	3	(Brazil) Tarso Marques	Team Penske	31	Contact	18	
27	22	(United States) Robby Gordon	Team Gordon	10	Contact	9	

== Caution flags ==
Laps	Cause
1	Field not aligned
12-26	Gordon (22) contact
33-44	Marques (3) contact
107-115	Gugelmin (17) stopped on track
116-130	Carpentier (33), Herta (8) contact
149-159	Tracy (26), Franchitti (27) contact
186-193	da Matta (25) engine blow-up

== Lap Leaders ==
Laps	Leader
1-36	Juan Pablo Montoya
37-74	Roberto Moreno
75-85	Al Unser Jr.
86-89	Roberto Moreno
90-102	Paul Tracy
103-104	Michael Andretti
105	Patrick Carpentier
106-109	Greg Moore
110-151	Michael Andretti
152-189	Hélio Castro-Neves
190-236	Michael Andretti

Driver	Laps led
Michael Andretti	91
Roberto Moreno	42
Hélio Castro-Neves	38
Juan Pablo Montoya	36
Paul Tracy	13
Al Unser Jr.	11
Greg Moore	4
Patrick Carpentier	1

== Point standings after race ==
Pos	Driver	Points
1	(Colombia) Juan Pablo Montoya	69
2	(United Kingdom) Dario Franchitti	65
3	(United States) Michael Andretti	61
4	(Canada) Greg Moore	53
5	(Brazil) Christian Fittipaldi	53
