= 1999 Texaco/Havoline 200 =

(United States) 1999 Road America
Race details
- Race 10 of 20 in the 1999 CART season
- Road America
- Date: July 11, 1999
- Official name: 1999 Texaco/Havoline 200
- Location: Road America; Elkhart Lake, Wisconsin, United States
- Course: Permanent road course 4.048 mi / 6.515 km
- Distance: 55 laps 222.64 mi / 358.325 km
- Weather: Dry

Pole position
- Driver: (United States) Michael Andretti (Newman-Haas Racing)
- Time: 1:40.206

Fastest lap
- Driver: (Brazil) Hélio Castro-Neves (Hogan Racing)
- Time: 1:41.984 (on lap 24 of 55)

Podium
- First: (Brazil) Christian Fittipaldi (Newman-Haas Racing)
- Second: (United States) Michael Andretti (Newman-Haas Racing)
- Third: (Mexico) Adrián Fernández (Patrick Racing)

The 1999 Texaco/Havoline 200 was the tenth round of the 1999 CART FedEx Champ Car World Series season, held on July 11, 1999, at Road America in Elkhart Lake, Wisconsin. Michael Andretti won his 32nd and final Pole Position of his career.

Christian Fittipaldi was the winner.

== Report ==
=== Race ===
The race was red-flagged on the first lap as the start saw six drivers being taken out in two separate incidents at different locations of the track. The race was restarted entirely, with the drivers involved being in their spare cars. Michael Andretti got a jump on the others from pole, but Juan Pablo Montoya simply drove around him at the first corner and took the lead. Andretti ran second early on, but he lost the spot to teammate Christian Fittipaldi at the first round of pit stops. Andretti wasted no time in passing his teammate for the second, with Adrián Fernández doing the same soon after and then attacking Andretti. That did not work out as Adrián Fernández spun and dropped back to fifth. By now, Montoya had a 12-second lead, but he started suffering from gearbox problems and started to lose time. Fittipaldi got the better of Andretti on the second pit stop as well, and kept the place this time, before closing Montoya down. He closed to within 1.5 seconds to Montoya, but the latter was able to nurse the car and maintain the gap. The third round of stops changed nothing, and Montoya was able to keep Fittipaldi at arm's length and nurse the car, but the gearbox broke entirely with seven laps left. Fittipaldi was handed the lead and took his first career win ahead of teammate Andretti, with Fernández completing the podium.

== Classification ==
=== Race ===
Pos	No	Driver	Team	Laps	Time/Retired	Grid	Points
1	11	(Brazil) Christian Fittipaldi	Newman-Haas Racing	55	1:37:00.799	4	20
2	6	(United States) Michael Andretti	Newman-Haas Racing	55	+1.060	1	16+1
3	40	(Mexico) Adrián Fernández	Patrick Racing	55	+17.427	5	14
4	99	(Canada) Greg Moore	Forsythe Racing	55	+19.397	8	12
5	7	(Italy) Max Papis	Team Rahal	55	+34.493	14	10
6	44	(Brazil) Tony Kanaan	Forsythe Racing	55	+58.434	10	8
7	19	(Mexico) Michel Jourdain Jr.	Payton/Coyne Racing	54	+1 Lap	18	6
8	22	(United States) Robby Gordon	Team Gordon	54	+1 Lap	23	5
9	2	(United States) Al Unser Jr.	Team Penske	54	+1 Lap	19	4
10	10	(United States) Richie Hearn	Della Penna Motorsports	54	+1 Lap	24	3
11	26	(Canada) Paul Tracy	Team Green	54	+1 Lap	9	2
12	17	(Brazil) Maurício Gugelmin	PacWest Racing	54	+1 Lap	13	1
13	4	(Colombia) Juan Pablo Montoya	Chip Ganassi Racing	49	Transmission	2	1
14	5	(Brazil) Gil de Ferran	Walker Racing	41	Engine	3	
15	8	(United States) Bryan Herta	Team Rahal	41	Electrical	12	
16	9	(Brazil) Hélio Castro-Neves	Hogan Racing	38	Suspension	20	
17	20	(United States) P. J. Jones	Patrick Racing	36	Contact	21	
18	27	(United Kingdom) Dario Franchitti	Team Green	34	Turbo	7	
19	18	(Brazil) Roberto Moreno	PacWest Racing	31	Engine	16	
20	36	(Brazil) Gualter Salles	All American Racing	31	Engine	25	
21	25	(Brazil) Cristiano da Matta	Arciero-Wells Racing	19	Transmission	11	
22	33	(Canada) Patrick Carpentier	Forsythe Racing	17	Engine	17	
23	12	(United States) Jimmy Vasser	Chip Ganassi Racing	15	Spun off	6	
24	71	(Brazil) Luiz Garcia Jr.	Payton/Coyne Racing	13	Engine	26	
25	24	(United States) Scott Pruett	Arciero-Wells Racing	6	Engine	22	
26	15	(United States) Memo Gidley	Walker Racing	3	Engine	15	

== Caution flags ==
No cautions.

== Lap Leaders ==
Laps	Leader
1-31	Juan Pablo Montoya
32-33	Greg Moore
34-48	Juan Pablo Montoya
49-55	Christian Fittipaldi

Driver	Laps led
Juan Pablo Montoya	46
Christian Fittipaldi	7
Greg Moore	2

== Point standings after race ==
Pos	Driver	Points
1	(Colombia) Juan Pablo Montoya	113
2	(United States) Michael Andretti	95
3	(Brazil) Gil de Ferran	87
4	(United Kingdom) Dario Franchitti	85
5	(Brazil) Christian Fittipaldi	82
