= 1999 Medic Drug Grand Prix of Cleveland =

(United States) 1999 Cleveland
Race details
- Race 9 of 20 in the 1999 CART season
- Burke Lakefront Airport track layout
- Date: June 27, 1999
- Official name: 1999 Medic Drug Grand Prix of Cleveland
- Location: Burke Lakefront Airport; Cleveland, Ohio, United States
- Course: Temporary airport course 2.369 mi / 3.790 km
- Distance: 90 laps 213.21 mi / 341.1 km
- Weather: Rain

Pole position
- Driver: (Colombia) Juan Pablo Montoya (Chip Ganassi Racing)
- Time: 56.813

Fastest lap
- Driver: (Brazil) Gil de Ferran (Walker Racing)
- Time: 58.790 (on lap 27 of 90)

Podium
- First: (Colombia) Juan Pablo Montoya (Chip Ganassi Racing)
- Second: (Brazil) Gil de Ferran (Walker Racing)
- Third: (United States) Michael Andretti (Newman-Haas Racing)

The 1999 Medic Drug Grand Prix of Cleveland was the ninth round of the 1999 CART FedEx Champ Car World Series season, held on June 27, 1999, at the Burke Lakefront Airport in Cleveland, Ohio.

== Report ==
=== Race ===
Pole Sitter and championship leader Juan Pablo Montoya led the early stages of the race until it was struck by a heavy rain shower on lap 33. Multiple cars crashed into the wall or spun, and the race ran under caution while the rain stopped, with Montoya leading from Paul Tracy and Gil de Ferran. When the race went green, de Ferran passed Tracy and then Montoya to take the lead. After the drivers changed to slick tires, Montoya came back at de Ferran and passed him on a restart on lap 69. He was able to pull away and win, the race being stopped on the 2-hour time limit. De Ferran finished second, and Michael Andretti third after a slow second pitstop for Tracy.

== Classification ==
=== Race ===
| Pos | No | Driver | Team | Laps | Time/Retired | Grid | Points |
|---|---|---|---|---|---|---|---|
| 1 | 4 | (Colombia) Juan Pablo Montoya | Chip Ganassi Racing | 90 | 2:01:04.277 | 1 | 20+1+1 |
| 2 | 5 | (Brazil) Gil de Ferran | Walker Racing | 90 | +10.604 | 2 | 16 |
| 3 | 6 | (United States) Michael Andretti | Newman-Haas Racing | 90 | +12.697 | 3 | 14 |
| 4 | 26 | (Canada) Paul Tracy | Team Green | 90 | +17.849 | 8 | 12 |
| 5 | 2 | (United States) Al Unser Jr. | Team Penske | 90 | +19.209 | 14 | 10 |
| 6 | 8 | (United States) Bryan Herta | Team Rahal | 90 | +19.754 | 4 | 8 |
| 7 | 33 | (Canada) Patrick Carpentier | Forsythe Racing | 90 | +20.596 | 6 | 6 |
| 8 | 18 | (Brazil) Roberto Moreno | PacWest Racing | 90 | +23.702 | 5 | 5 |
| 9 | 22 | (United States) Robby Gordon | Team Gordon | 89 | +1 Lap | 24 | 4 |
| 10 | 10 | (United States) Richie Hearn | Della Penna Motorsports | 88 | +2 Laps | 25 | 3 |
| 11 | 15 | (United States) Memo Gidley | Walker Racing | 88 | +2 Laps | 21 | 2 |
| 12 | 11 | (Brazil) Christian Fittipaldi | Newman-Haas Racing | 88 | +2 Laps | 11 | 1 |
| 13 | 36 | (Brazil) Gualter Salles | All American Racing | 88 | +2 Laps | 26 | |
| 14 | 71 | (Brazil) Luiz Garcia Jr. | Payton/Coyne Racing | 87 | +3 Laps | 27 | |
| 15 | 20 | (United States) P. J. Jones | Patrick Racing | 86 | +4 Laps | 16 | |
| 16 | 7 | (Italy) Max Papis | Team Rahal | 86 | +4 Laps | 22 | |
| 17 | 24 | (United States) Scott Pruett | Arciero-Wells Racing | 70 | Engine | 18 | |
| 18 | 99 | (Canada) Greg Moore | Forsythe Racing | 64 | Exhaust | 7 | |
| 19 | 40 | (Mexico) Adrián Fernández | Patrick Racing | 63 | Contact | 12 | |
| 20 | 25 | (Brazil) Cristiano da Matta | Arciero-Wells Racing | 37 | Suspension | 13 | |
| 21 | 17 | (Brazil) Maurício Gugelmin | PacWest Racing | 34 | Contact | 9 | |
| 22 | 44 | (Brazil) Tony Kanaan | Forsythe Racing | 33 | Contact | 19 | |
| 23 | 12 | (United States) Jimmy Vasser | Chip Ganassi Racing | 33 | Contact | 15 | |
| 24 | 3 | (Brazil) Tarso Marques | Team Penske | 32 | Contact | 23 | |
| 25 | 27 | (United Kingdom) Dario Franchitti | Team Green | 19 | Throttle | 10 | |
| 26 | 9 | (Brazil) Hélio Castro-Neves | Hogan Racing | 19 | Linkage | 17 | |
| 27 | 19 | (Mexico) Michel Jourdain Jr. | Payton/Coyne Racing | 2 | Transmission | 20 | |

== Caution flags ==
| Laps | Cause |
|---|---|
| 35-50 | Kanaan (44) contact, Vasser (12) contact, Marques (3) contact, Heavy rain |
| 66-69 | Fernández (40) contact |

== Lap Leaders ==
| Laps | Leader |
|---|---|
| 1-30 | Juan Pablo Montoya |
| 31 | Roberto Moreno |
| 32 | Juan Pablo Montoya |
| 33-34 | Roberto Moreno |
| 35-57 | Juan Pablo Montoya |
| 58-61 | Gil de Ferran |
| 62 | Paul Tracy |
| 63 | Michael Andretti |
| 64-68 | Gil de Ferran |
| 69-90 | Juan Pablo Montoya |

| Driver | Laps led |
|---|---|
| Juan Pablo Montoya | 76 |
| Gil de Ferran | 9 |
| Roberto Moreno | 3 |
| Michael Andretti | 1 |
| Paul Tracy | 1 |

== Point standings after race ==
| Pos | Driver | Points |
|---|---|---|
| 1 | (Colombia) Juan Pablo Montoya | 112 |
| 2 | (Brazil) Gil de Ferran | 87 |
| 3 | (United Kingdom) Dario Franchitti | 85 |
| 4 | (United States) Michael Andretti | 78 |
| 5 | (Canada) Greg Moore | 69 |
