= 1999 Bosch Spark Plug Grand Prix =

(United States) 1999 Nazareth
Race details
- Race 4 of 20 in the 1999 CART season
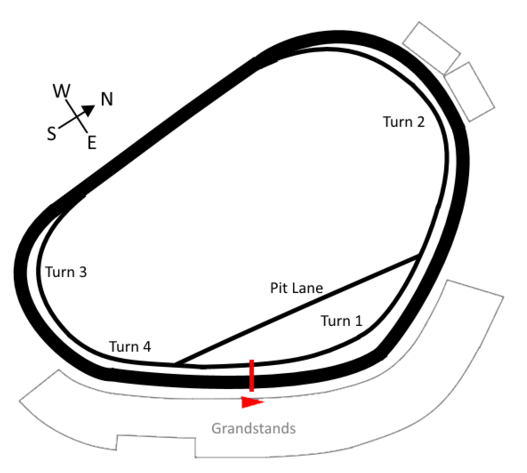
- Nazareth Speedway
- Date: May 2, 1999
- Official name: 1999 Bosch Spark Plug Grand Prix
- Location: Nazareth Speedway; Nazareth, Pennsylvania, United States
- Course: Permanent oval course 0.946 mi / 1.522 km
- Distance: 225 laps 212.85 mi / 342.45 km
- Weather: Dry

Pole position
- Driver: (Colombia) Juan Pablo Montoya (Chip Ganassi Racing)
- Time: 19.600

Fastest lap
- Driver: (Brazil) Hélio Castro-Neves (Hogan Racing)
- Time: 21.106 (on lap 19 of 225)

Podium
- First: (Colombia) Juan Pablo Montoya (Chip Ganassi Racing)
- Second: (United States) P. J. Jones (Patrick Racing)
- Third: (Canada) Paul Tracy (Team KOOL Green)

The 1999 Bosch Spark Plug Grand Prix was the fourth round of the 1999 CART FedEx Champ Car World Series season, held on May 2, 1999, on the Nazareth Speedway in Nazareth, Pennsylvania.

== Report ==
=== Race ===
Juan Pablo Montoya followed up on his win in Long Beach by taking his first CART pole in Nazareth, beating Hélio Castro-Neves by the minute margin of one-thousandth of a second. Montoya led the early stages of the race until Castro-Neves passed him in traffic on lap 39, however, a quicker pitstop by Montoya's Ganassi team got Montoya back out in front again. Montoya led for the next 95 laps, but Castro-Neves stayed on his tail all the time, the duo being much quicker than anyone else. Castro-Neves again passed Montoya on lap 145, only for the pit stops to reverse the order. On the resulting restart, Castro-Neves was caught out and passed by P. J. Jones, and later while trying to get the place back, he spun and lost two laps, before eventually crashing out. Montoya cruised to victory ahead of Jones and Paul Tracy, which also gave him the championship lead.

== Classification ==
=== Race ===
Pos	No	Driver	Team	Laps	Time/Retired	Grid	Points
1	4	(Colombia) Juan Pablo Montoya	Chip Ganassi Racing	225	1:46:13.527	1	20+1+1
2	20	(United States) P. J. Jones	Patrick Racing	225	+5.103	8	16
3	26	(Canada) Paul Tracy	Team Green	225	+5.880	4	14
4	25	(Brazil) Cristiano da Matta	Arciero-Wells Racing	225	+6.305	17	12
5	40	(Mexico) Adrián Fernández	Patrick Racing	225	+16.401	9	10
6	6	(United States) Michael Andretti	Newman-Haas Racing	225	+16.719	14	8
7	11	(Brazil) Christian Fittipaldi	Newman-Haas Racing	225	+20.624	12	6
8	27	(United Kingdom) Dario Franchitti	Team Green	225	+21.836	3	5
9	36	(United States) Alex Barron	All American Racing	224	+1 Lap	18	4
10	24	(United States) Scott Pruett	Arciero-Wells Racing	224	+1 Lap	21	3
11	12	(United States) Jimmy Vasser	Chip Ganassi Racing	224	+1 Lap	11	2
12	99	(Canada) Greg Moore	Forsythe Racing	224	+1 Lap	10	1
13	7	(Italy) Max Papis	Team Rahal	224	+1 Lap	7	
14	33	(Canada) Patrick Carpentier	Forsythe Racing	224	+1 Lap	6	
15	5	(Brazil) Gil de Ferran	Walker Racing	224	+1 Lap	13	
16	19	(Mexico) Michel Jourdain Jr.	Payton/Coyne Racing	224	+1 Lap	22	
17	18	(United Kingdom) Mark Blundell	PacWest Racing	223	+2 Laps	5	
18	17	(Brazil) Maurício Gugelmin	PacWest Racing	222	+3 Laps	15	
19	22	(United States) Robby Gordon	Team Gordon	220	+5 Laps	24	
20	10	(United States) Richie Hearn	Della Penna Motorsports	212	Oil Pressure	19	
21	9	(Brazil) Hélio Castro-Neves	Hogan Racing	175	Contact	2	
22	8	(United States) Bryan Herta	Team Rahal	77	Handling	16	
23	44	(Brazil) Tony Kanaan	Forsythe Racing	51	Engine	20	
24	2	(United States) Al Unser Jr.	Team Penske	44	Contact	23	
WD	34	(United States) Dennis Vitolo	Payton/Coyne Racing		Withdrew		
WD	16	(Japan) Shigeaki Hattori	Bettenhausen Racing		Withdrew		

== Caution flags ==
Laps	Cause
12-17	Tracy (26) spin
46-59	Unser Jr. (2) contact
146-154	Jones (20) spin
171-176	Castro-Neves (9) spin
179-199	Castro-Neves (9) contact

== Lap Leaders ==
Laps	Leader
1-38	Juan Pablo Montoya
39-49	Hélio Castro-Neves
50-144	Juan Pablo Montoya
145-148	Hélio Castro-Neves
149-225	Juan Pablo Montoya

Driver	Laps led
Juan Pablo Montoya	210
Hélio Castro-Neves	15

== Point standings after race ==
Pos	Driver	Points
1	(Colombia) Juan Pablo Montoya	45
2	(Mexico) Adrián Fernández	43
3	(Canada) Greg Moore	40
4	(United States) Michael Andretti	40
5	(United Kingdom) Dario Franchitti	35
