= 1999 U.S. 500 =

(United States) 1999 U.S. 500
Race details
- Race 12 of 20 in the 1999 CART season
- Michigan International Speedway
- Date: July 25, 1999
- Official name: U.S. 500 Presented by Toyota
- Location: Michigan International Speedway, Brooklyn, Michigan, United States
- Course: Permanent racing facility 2.000 mi / 3.219 km
- Distance: 250 laps 500.000 mi / 804.672 km
- Weather: Dry

Pole position
- Driver: (United States) Jimmy Vasser (Chip Ganassi Racing)
- Time: 31.358 (229.6 mph)

Fastest lap
- Driver: (United States) Jimmy Vasser (Chip Ganassi Racing)
- Time: 31.778 (on lap 236 of 250)

Podium
- First: (Brazil) Tony Kanaan (Forsythe Racing)
- Second: (Colombia) Juan Pablo Montoya (Chip Ganassi Racing)
- Third: (Canada) Paul Tracy (Team KOOL Green)

The 1999 U.S. 500 was the twelfth round of the 1999 CART FedEx Champ Car World Series season, held on July 25, 1999 at the Michigan International Speedway in Brooklyn, Michigan.

== Report ==
=== Race ===
The qualifying saw Jimmy Vasser take the pole with Adrián Fernández alongside, but at the second attempt to start (the first was called off due to field alignment issues), it was the second-row starters Juan Pablo Montoya and Michael Andretti who raced away into the first two spots. In the early stages, the duo exchanged the lead many times (most unofficial, though) before Andretti was able to build a lead. He led until the second round of pit stops when a caution due to Gil de Ferran's crash bunched the field up, allowing second-placed Montoya to close and pass him on the restart. The duo again battled for the lead, but then Max Papis surged bast both of them and began to pull away. Papis led comfortably until a crash for P. J. Jones erased a nine-second lead and allowed Andretti to jump him in the pit stops. The restart saw Papis battle with Andretti and Dario Franchitti for a few laps before breaking away again, only for another caution caused by Scott Pruett's crash to again bring the field closer to him. Once again Papis was able to pull away from his pursuers when the race went green, as an epic battle for second commenced between the Team Green duo of Franchitti and Paul Tracy, and the Newman-Haas duo of Andretti and Christian Fittipaldi, which was later joined by Montoya and Tony Kanaan as well. After the final round of pit stops, Papis continued to lead, though Kanaan, on an alternate strategy was able to run 5-7 laps longer than other frontrunners and thus had a shorter stop and was up to second, only three seconds behind Papis, and well ahead of a battle between Andretti, Franchitti, and Tracy for third. Kanaan initially closed up on Papis, but Papis was able to pull away again, and, behind them, the Ganassi drivers, Montoya and Jimmy Vasser started to set a searing pace. Both passed Andretti, Franchitti, and Tracy and set off after Kanaan, lapping much quicker than anyone else. However, Vasser had to pit for more fuel after a problem with the fuel rig, and this also made Montoya's task harder as he now had to chase Kanaan on his own without his teammate's help. Papis continued to lead and was well set to take his first career win only for his car to run out of fuel midway through the last lap. Kanaan went by but Montoya was right with him and attempted to pass him at the line. Kanaan however, held on to beat Montoya by 0.032 seconds, with Tracy taking the final step of the podium after passing Andretti at the line.

== Classification ==
=== Race ===
Pos	No	Driver	Team	Laps	Time/Retired	Grid	Points
1	44	(Brazil) Tony Kanaan	Forsythe Racing	250	2:41:12.632	11	20
2	4	(Colombia) Juan Pablo Montoya	Chip Ganassi Racing	250	+0.032	3	16
3	26	(Canada) Paul Tracy	Team Green	250	+8.453	8	14
4	6	(United States) Michael Andretti	Newman-Haas Racing	250	+8.506	4	12
5	27	(United Kingdom) Dario Franchitti	Team Green	250	+9.137	9	10
6	40	(Mexico) Adrián Fernández	Patrick Racing	250	+9.521	2	8
7	7	(Italy) Max Papis	Team Rahal	250	+10.343	6	6+1
8	11	(Brazil) Christian Fittipaldi	Newman-Haas Racing	250	+15.410	16	5
9	12	(United States) Jimmy Vasser	Chip Ganassi Racing	249	+1 Lap	1	4+1
10	33	(Canada) Patrick Carpentier	Forsythe Racing	248	+2 Laps	12	3
11	34	(United States) Dennis Vitolo	Payton/Coyne Racing	232	+18 Laps	23	2
12	10	(United States) Richie Hearn	Della Penna Motorsports	207	Electrical	20	1
13	2	(United States) Al Unser Jr.	Team Penske	206	Engine	13	
14	24	(United States) Scott Pruett	Arciero-Wells Racing	183	Contact	5	
15	36	(Brazil) Gualter Salles	All American Racing	146	Engine	24	
16	20	(United States) P. J. Jones	Patrick Racing	132	Contact	22	
17	25	(Brazil) Cristiano da Matta	Arciero-Wells Racing	126	Electrical	10	
18	3	(United States) Alex Barron	Team Penske	120	Engine	18	
19	18	(Brazil) Roberto Moreno	PacWest Racing	113	Handling	13	
20	8	(United States) Bryan Herta	Team Rahal	92	Suspension	7	
21	19	(Mexico) Michel Jourdain Jr.	Payton/Coyne Racing	80	Driveshaft	26	
22	17	(Brazil) Maurício Gugelmin	PacWest Racing	64	Radiator	14	
23	99	(Canada) Greg Moore	Forsythe Racing	63	Transmission	21	
24	5	(Brazil) Gil de Ferran	Walker Racing	59	Contact	15	
25	9	(Brazil) Hélio Castro-Neves	Hogan Racing	47	Electrical	19	
26	22	(United States) Robby Gordon	Team Gordon	33	Handling	25	

== Caution flags ==
Laps	Cause
1	Field not aligned
61-71	de Ferran (5) contact
137-144	Jones (20) contact
185-193	Pruett (24) contact

== Lap Leaders ==
Laps	Leader
1	Jimmy Vasser
2-7	Juan Pablo Montoya
8	Michael Andretti
9-18	Juan Pablo Montoya
19-36	Michael Andretti
37-38	Paul Tracy
39-70	Michael Andretti
71-72	Juan Pablo Montoya
73	Michael Andretti
74	Juan Pablo Montoya
75	Michael Andretti
76-83	Juan Pablo Montoya
84-105	Max Papis
106-107	Michael Andretti
108-139	Max Papis
140-144	Michael Andretti
145-147	Max Papis
148	Dario Franchitti
149-151	Max Papis
152	Dario Franchitti
153	Michael Andretti
154-177	Max Papis
178	Dario Franchitti
179-182	Michael Andretti
183-220	Max Papis
221	Juan Pablo Montoya
222	Dario Franchitti
223-228	Tony Kanaan
229-249	Max Papis
250	Tony Kanaan

Driver	Laps led
Max Papis	143
Michael Andretti	65
Juan Pablo Montoya	28
Tony Kanaan	7
Dario Franchitti	4
Paul Tracy	2
Jimmy Vasser	1

== Point standings after race ==
Pos	Driver	Points
1	(Colombia) Juan Pablo Montoya	129
2	(United Kingdom) Dario Franchitti	116
3	(United States) Michael Andretti	107
4	(Brazil) Christian Fittipaldi	101
5	(Mexico) Adrián Fernández	95
