= Chip Ganassi Racing =

American auto racing team

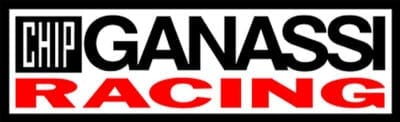
- Owner(s): Chip Ganassi
- Principal(s): Mike Hull
- Base: Indianapolis, Indiana
- Series: IndyCar Series; Indy NXT
- Race drivers: IndyCar: 8. (Cayman Islands) Kyffin Simpson; 9. (Denmark) Christian Lundgaard; 10. (Spain) Álex Palou; Indy NXT; 8. TBA; 9. TBA; 10. (Argentina) Alessandro de Tullio; 11. (United States) Carson Etter
- Manufacturer: Honda

Career
- Debut: CART/CCWS: 1990 Autoworks 200; IndyCar: 2000 Indianapolis 500; NASCAR (Cup Series): 1989 Motorcraft Quality Parts 500 (Atlanta) (Note: Running as SABCO Racing.); 2001 Daytona 500 (Daytona) (Note: Running as Chip Ganassi Racing with Felix Sabates.); NASCAR (Busch/Nationwide/Xfinity Series): 2004 Kroger 200 Presented by Tom Raper RVs (Note: Previously ran in the series as SABCO Racing.)
- Drivers' Championships: Total: 23; Champ Car: 4 IndyCar: 14; Grand-Am: 5
- Indy 500 victories: 6 (2000, 2008, 2010, 2012, 2022, 2025)
- Race victories: Total: 281; CART/CCWS: 40; IndyCar: 111; NASCAR Cup Series: 27 (Note: 7 wins for SABCO Racing, 15 for Chip Ganassi Racing and 5 for Earnhardt Ganassi Racing.); NASCAR Xfinity Series: 22 (Note: 1 win for SABCO Racing, 1 for HScott Motorsports with Chip Ganassi and 20 for Chip Ganassi Racing.); ARCA Racing Series: 5 Rolex: 41; IMSA: 26 (Note: Prototype: 5, GTLM: 13, DPi: 5, GTP: 3); WEC: 6 Global RallyCross Championship: 2 Extreme E: 1

Chip Ganassi Racing, LLC (CGR, also sometimes branded as Chip Ganassi Racing Teams), is an American auto racing organization competing in the NTT IndyCar Series. They have formerly competed in the NASCAR Cup and Xfinity Series, Global Rallycross Championship, Extreme E, Rolex Sports Car Series, IMSA WeatherTech SportsCar Championship and the FIA World Endurance Championship. It was founded in 1990 by businessman and former racecar driver Chip Ganassi from the assets of Patrick Racing to compete in the CART IndyCar World Series.

After winning four consecutive CART championships from 1996 to 1999 with drivers Jimmy Vasser, Alex Zanardi and Juan Pablo Montoya, in 2000 Ganassi became the first CART organization to return to the Indianapolis 500 after the open-wheel "split" between CART and the Indy Racing League in 1996. A dominant victory with Montoya would foresee the team's permanent switch to the IRL (now IndyCar Series), where further championships would be won with Scott Dixon, Dario Franchitti and Álex Palou, including another four straight from 2008 to 2011. In 2026, the team fielded the Nos. 8, 9 and 10 Dallara-Hondas for Kyffin Simpson, Dixon, and Palou full-time in the IndyCar Series, and the Nos. 8, 9, 10 and 11 Dallaras for James Roe, Bryce Aron, Niels Koolen and Carson Etter in the Indy NXT Series.

In 2001, Ganassi bought a majority stake in Felix Sabates' Team SABCO NASCAR team, which had operated since 1989, marking his entry into that championship as Chip Ganassi Racing with Felix Sabates and inheriting that organizations history, while also partnering to compete in the Grand-Am Rolex Sports Car Series. In 2009, Ganassi partnered with Dale Earnhardt, Inc. owner Teresa Earnhardt to merge their NASCAR operations into Ganassi's shop and run under the banner of Earnhardt Ganassi Racing with Felix Sabates. The NASCAR team dropped the Earnhardt name in 2014, and Ganassi revealed that Teresa was never truly involved with the team. Rob Kauffman, chairman of the Race Team Alliance, purchased a stake in the team in 2015. Sabates retired from his ownership role after the 2020 season. In 2021, Ganassi accepted an unsolicited offer from former CGR Xfinity Series driver Justin Marks to sell the entire NASCAR operation to Marks' Trackhouse Racing Team, with the deal finalized after that season. The NASCAR program fielded full-time entries for notable drivers including Kyle Petty, Joe Nemechek, Sterling Marlin, Jimmy Spencer, Casey Mears, Juan Pablo Montoya, Jamie McMurray, Kyle Larson, Kurt Busch and Ross Chastain

Together, they have won 18 Open Wheel titles (4 in CART, 14 in IndyCar), 7 Grand-Am sports car championships, and wins in the Indianapolis 500 (six times), Daytona 500, Brickyard 400, 24 Hours of Daytona, 12 Hours of Sebring, Petit Le Mans and a 24 Hours of Le Mans class win, and over 275 wins across all categories.

== American open-wheel racing history ==
=== Drivers ===
==== Current ====
- 8 (Cayman Islands) Kyffin Simpson
- 9 (New Zealand) Scott Dixon
- 10 (Spain) Álex Palou

==== Drivers (chronological) ====
- (United States) Eddie Cheever (1990–1992)
- (Netherlands) Arie Luyendyk (1992–1993, 1997)
- (United States) Robby Gordon (1992)
- (Belgium) Didier Theys (1992)
- (United States) Michael Andretti (1994)
- (Brazil) Maurício Gugelmin (1994)
- (United States) Bryan Herta (1995)
- (United States) Mike Groff (1995: Indianapolis 500 only)
- (United States) Jimmy Vasser (1995–2000, 2001: Indianapolis 500 only)
- (Italy) Alex Zanardi (1996–1998)
- (Colombia) Juan Pablo Montoya (1999–2000)
- (France) Nicolas Minassian (2001)
- (Mexico) Memo Gidley (2001)
- (United States) Tony Stewart (2001: Indianapolis 500 only)
- (Brazil) Bruno Junqueira (2001–2002)
- (United States) Jeff Ward (2002)
- (Sweden) Kenny Bräck (2002)
- (New Zealand) Scott Dixon (2002–2026)
- (South Africa) Tomas Scheckter (2003)
- (United States) Tony Renna (2004) (Note: Renna never drove a race for the team, because he died during a tire test in Indianapolis Motor Speedway on October 22, 2003. He was replaced by Darren Manning.)
- (United Kingdom) Darren Manning (2004–2005)
- (United States) Jaques Lazier (2005) (Note: Hired by the team as an injury replacement.)
- (Italy) Giorgio Pantano (2005, 2012)
- (Australia) Ryan Briscoe (2005, 2013: Indianapolis 500 only, 2014)
- (United Kingdom) Dan Wheldon (2006–2008)
- (United Kingdom) Dario Franchitti (2008–2013)
- (United States) Graham Rahal (2011–2012)
- (United States) Charlie Kimball (2011–2017)
- (Canada) Alex Tagliani (2013)
- (Brazil) Tony Kanaan (2014–2017, 2021, 2022: Indianapolis 500 only)
- (United States) Sage Karam (2015)
- (Colombia) Sebastián Saavedra (2015)
- (United Kingdom) Max Chilton (2016–2017)
- (United Arab Emirates) Ed Jones (2018)
- (Sweden) Felix Rosenqvist (2019–2020)
- (Sweden) Marcus Ericsson (2020–2023)
- (Spain) **Álex Palou (2021–present)**
- (United States) Jimmie Johnson (2021–2022)
- (New Zealand) Marcus Armstrong (2023–2024)
- (Japan) Takuma Sato (2023)
- (Sweden) Linus Lundqvist (2024)
- (Cayman Islands) **Kyffin Simpson (2024–present)**
- (Denmark) **Christian Lundgaard (beginning 2027)**

=== CART history ===
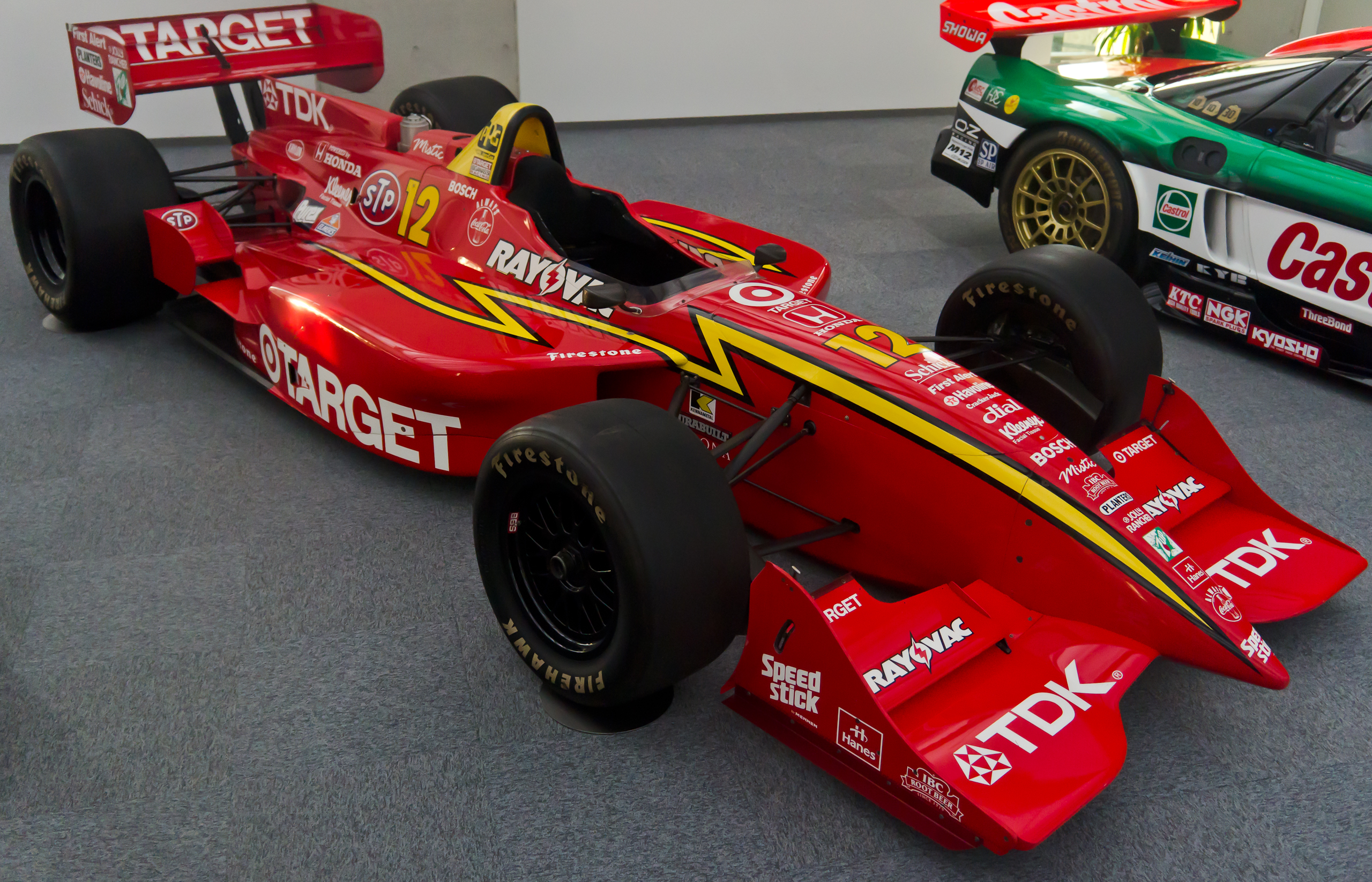
Jimmy Vasser's Reynard 96I in a Honda Collection Hall.

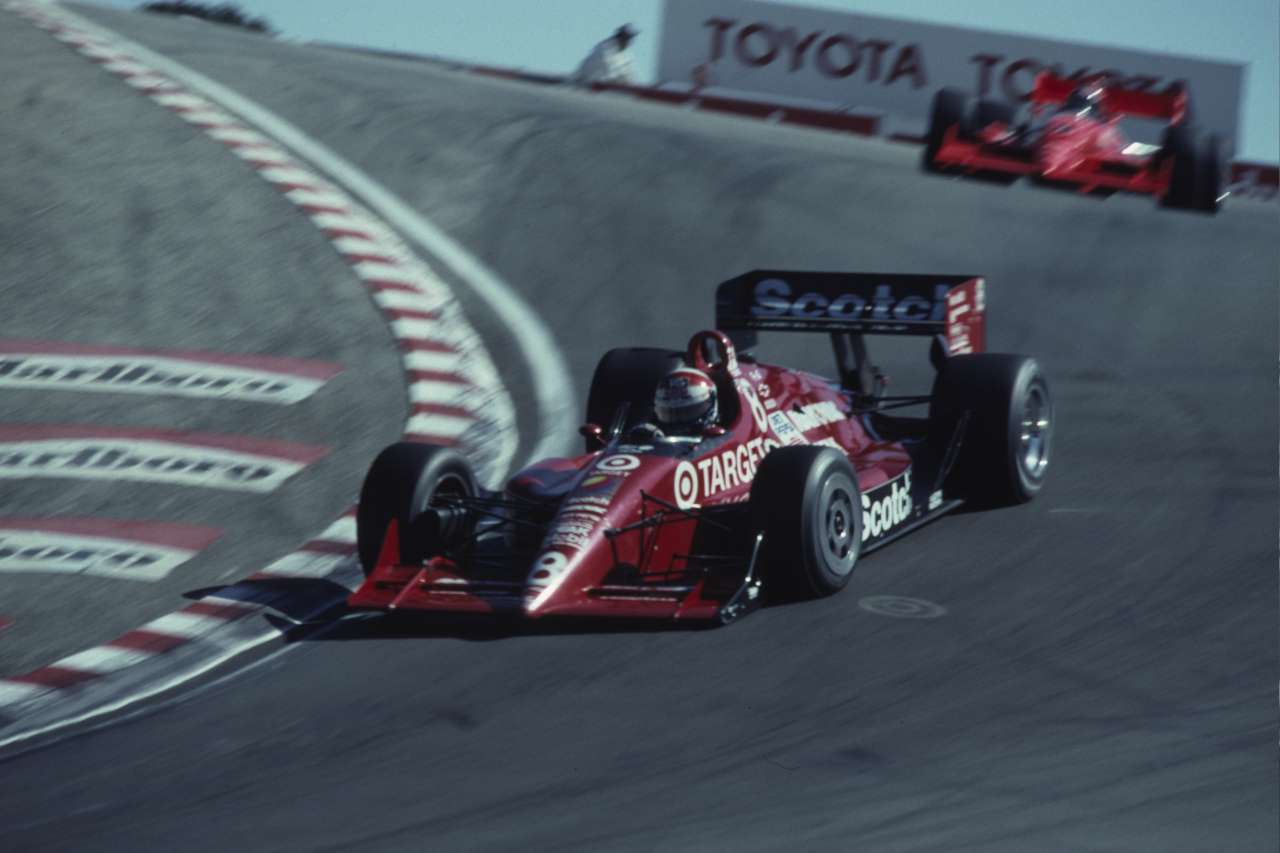
Eddie Cheever at Laguna Seca in 1991.

In 1989, Chip Ganassi, who had driven in the IndyCar World Series but had his career cut short due to a crash at Michigan in 1984, joined Pat Patrick as co-owner for Emerson Fittipaldi's Marlboro IndyCar team. Patrick had announced he was going to retire at the end of the year, and the team would go completely to Ganassi. The team won the Indy 500 and the IndyCar Championship.

By season's end, Patrick had second thoughts. Instead of retracting the sale of the team to Ganassi, he went ahead with the deal as planned and instead restarted his team by taking over the upstart Alfa Romeo IndyCar effort for 1990. Fittipaldi took the Marlboro sponsorship to Team Penske, an arrangement that was also pre-planned (Penske had supplied Patrick with a fleet of Penske chassis for 1989 as part of the deal).

Ganassi officially took over the remaining assets of the team (including the 1989 Penske chassis) and renamed it Chip Ganassi Racing. He signed former Formula One driver Eddie Cheever and raced full-time in the IndyCar World series with Target as the primary sponsor.

In 1992, Ganassi expanded to a two-car effort for the Indy 500, adding Arie Luyendyk for the Indy-only entry. Later Ganassi debuted rookie Robby Gordon in selected events. For 1993, Luyendyk replaced Cheever full-time. Luyendyk won the pole position for the Indy 500 and finished second to Fittipaldi, Ganassi's former driver in his partnership with Patrick. For 1994, Michael Andretti joined the team, immediately after returning from his failed transition to Formula One in 1993. Prior to the 1994 season, Ganassi speculated that if the team couldn't win with Michael Andretti, perhaps he shouldn't be a team owner, "We had to stretch to get Michael Andretti, and we stretched. I knew then we had a guy that could win races. I thought, 'If I have a guy in the car that can win races and we don't win races, who are they going to look at?'" At the opening race of the 1994 season Andretti scored Ganassi's first IndyCar victory at Surfers Paradise.

Target continued to sponsor Ganassi's operation through the decade, and by the mid part of the decade, the team had risen to the top of the series. Perhaps the most impressive was Juan Pablo Montoya winning the championship in his rookie season in 1999. They won four consecutive series championships, with Jimmy Vasser (1996), Alex Zanardi (1997–1998), and Montoya in 1999, becoming the first car owner to win four consecutive CART championships. In 2000, Ganassi became the first CART team to break ranks and return to race in the Indianapolis 500, part of the rival Indy Racing League. The team saw instant success as Montoya dominated the race. Montoya also became the first driver to win the Indianapolis 500 and the Michigan 500 in the same year since Rick Mears in 1991. However, he was unable to duplicate his championship success of 1999.

The switch from Honda to Toyota was responsible for Montoya's drop-off. He matched his 1999 total with seven pole positions. He again led the series with 867 laps led, nearly matching his 1999 total. Reliability issues limited Montoya to 3 wins and a 9th-place finish in the championship. With double digit DNFs, mechanical failures cost him the opportunity to defend his title.

Vasser's performance steadily dwindled, as his lone victory at Houston was his first in nearly two years.

The team ran from 1992 to 2002 before moving into the Indy Racing League full-time. They had run one IRL entry for former motocross racer Jeff Ward in 2002, in which Ward won one race at Texas in one of the closest finishes in IRL history.

=== IndyCar Series history ===
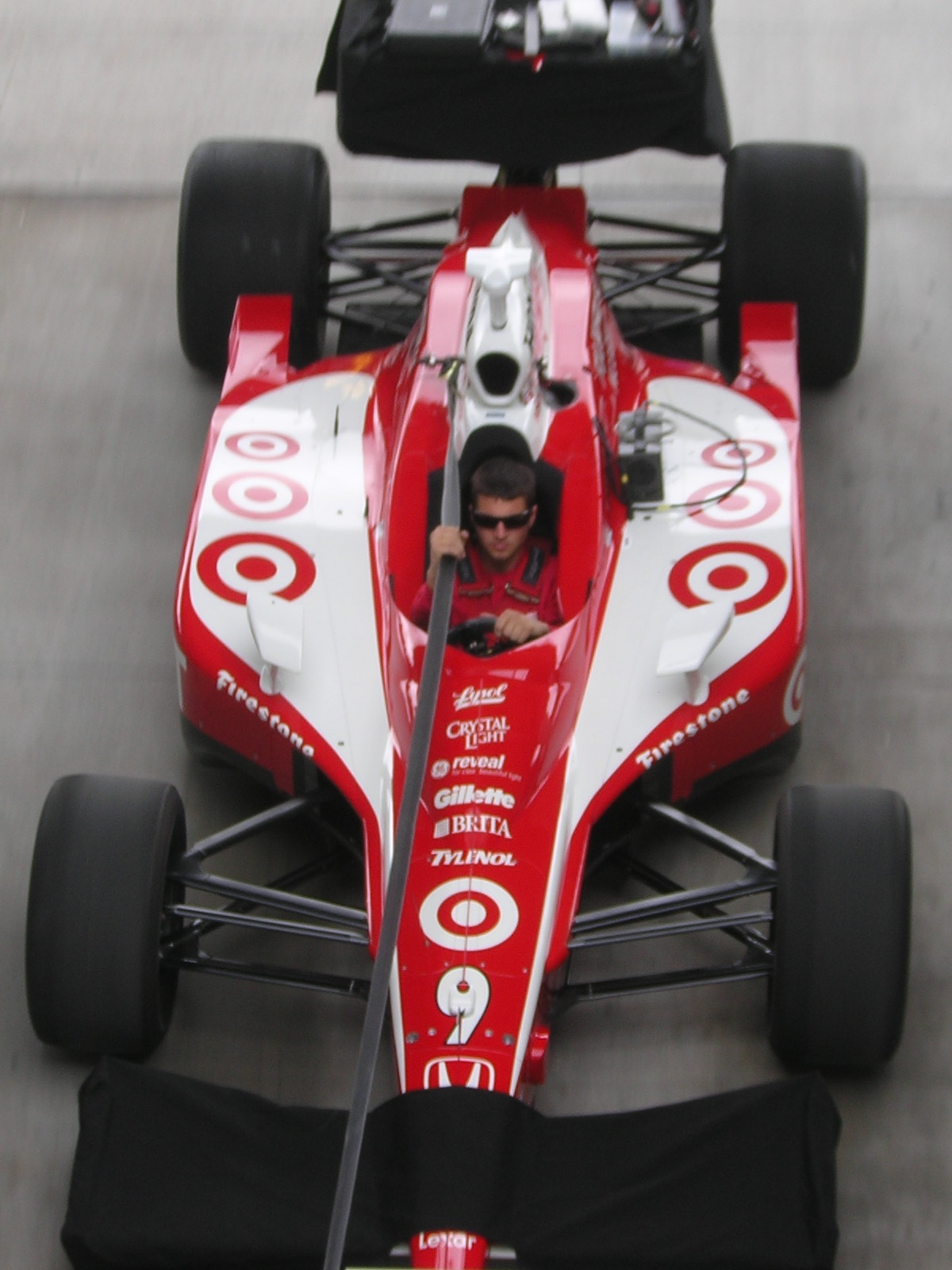
Ganassi's No. 9 car of Scott Dixon preparing for practice

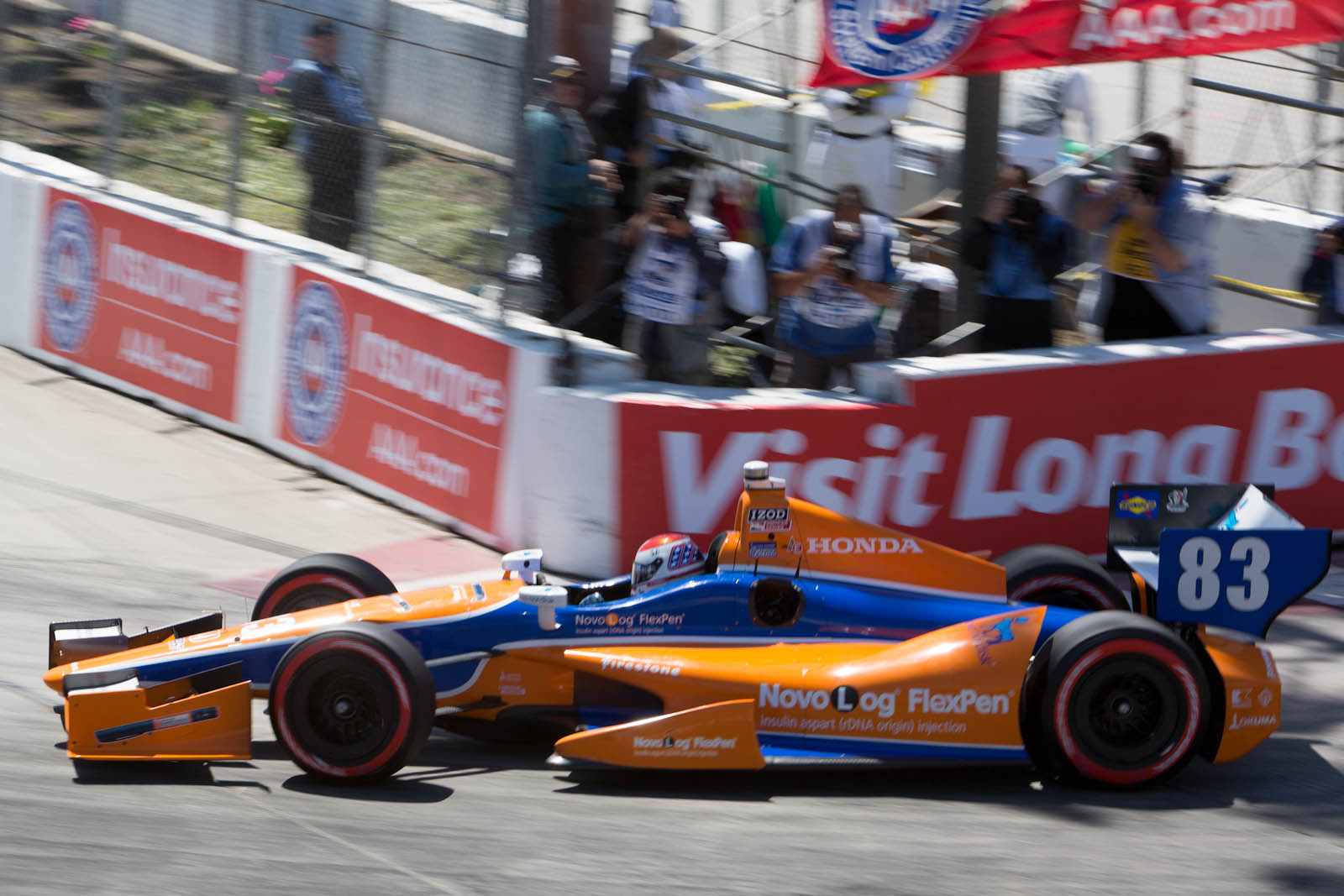
Charlie Kimball at the 2012 Toyota Grand Prix of Long Beach.

Chip Ganassi Racing initially entered the Indy Racing League (IRL) with Juan Pablo Montoya and Jimmy Vasser in the 2000 Indianapolis 500 won by rookie Montoya. In 2001, they returned to Indy with Vasser, Bruno Junqueira, Nicolas Minassian, and NASCAR's Tony Stewart, who would also compete in that evening's Coca-Cola 600. But in neither year did they run the entire IndyCar Series season.

For 2002, Ganassi made the jump to the IndyCar Series full-time with Jeff Ward driving one car, with the addition of Ganassi's two CART Championship drivers Kenny Bräck and Bruno Junqueira at Indianapolis. None of those three would drive for Ganassi in 2003; the replacements were Scott Dixon – a midseason addition to Ganassi's Champ Car team in 2002 – and Tomas Scheckter. Dixon won three races and the series championship while Scheckter struggled and was released from his contract. Tony Renna was due to replace him, but was killed in a testing crash at Indianapolis. Englishman Darren Manning wound up in the seat for 2004. The team's performance suffered the next two seasons and when Manning was fired, a bevy of drivers ran in Ganassi's cars, among them former Formula One test drivers Ryan Briscoe and Giorgio Pantano, and Jaques Lazier. For 2006, Ganassi scaled back to two cars, with Dixon returning along with 2005 Indianapolis 500 Champion Dan Wheldon, whom Ganassi signed away from Andretti Green Racing in the offseason. The team also changed to Honda engines (due to series engine supplier standardization from 2006 to 2011 seasons), along with all other IndyCar teams, and Dallara chassis for 2006.

The 2007 IndyCar Series season showed promise for Ganassi, as Dixon took 4 wins at Watkins Glen, Nashville, Mid Ohio, and Sonoma and Wheldon took 2 additional wins at Homestead and Kansas. The 2008 IndyCar season was even stronger for the team with eventual champion Dixon taking wins at Homestead, Indianapolis, Texas, Nashville, Edmonton, and Kentucky, and teammate Wheldon finishing 4th overall after winning at Kansas again and at Iowa. Shortly before the conclusion of the season it was announced that Wheldon would not return as Dixon's teammate in 2009, a role taken by 2007 IndyCar Champion and Indy 500 winner Dario Franchitti of Scotland. Franchitti teamed with Dixon for the non-championship race at Surfers' Paradise at the end of 2008.

The Target Chip Ganassi car driven by Franchitti won the 94th running of the Indianapolis 500 on Sunday May 30, 2010.

For 2011, Ganassi expanded, to add an additional 2-car team for Graham Rahal and Charlie Kimball housed in the race shop of NHRA drag racer Kenny Bernstein.

Ganassi announced that in 2012, all 4 cars would be powered by Honda engines after the series decided to have multiple engine manufacturers (Honda, Chevrolet, and Lotus) for the first time since 2005.

The Ganassi cars driven by Franchitti and Dixon came in first and second in the 2012 Indianapolis 500 on Sunday, May 27, 2012. It was Franchitti's third Indianapolis 500 win and his second win with Ganassi. Rahal left Ganassi following the season for his father's team, Rahal Letterman Lanigan Racing. In 2013, the team was dominant for the second half of the year, with Kimball's first win at Mid-Ohio, and Dixon adding four wins to overtake Hélio Castroneves for his third IndyCar title. The team also ran a fourth car, the No. 8, at Indianapolis for Briscoe, sponsored by NTT DATA. Despite the title, Ganassi was dealt a major blow when Franchitti was medically forced into retirement following a crash at Race 2 in Houston. Alex Tagliani replaced Franchitti at Auto Club.

In 2014, Ganassi switched to Chevrolet engines. In a twist, Ganassi would hire 2013 Indy 500 winner Tony Kanaan to drive the No. 10 Target car, while Briscoe and NTT Data signed on for a full season in the No. 8 car. The team once again struggled during the first half of the season, but hit its stride during the second half, with Dixon winning at Mid-Ohio and Sonoma, while Kanaan won the season finale at Auto Club. For 2015, the team would sign Indy Lights champion Sage Karam to share the No. 8 with Sebastián Saavedra. Dixon would claim his fourth title in a tiebreaker with Juan Pablo Montoya on the strength of three wins at Long Beach, Texas, and Sonoma. Kanaan would not win that year but had two runner-up finishes at Texas and Fontana. Both Karam and Saavedra would struggle in the No. 8, save for a lone podium by Karam at Iowa. For 2016, Ganassi would replace Karam and Saavedra with former Formula 1 driver Max Chilton. 2016 would be a down year for the team, with Dixon winning twice at Phoenix and Watkins Glen, while Kanaan had only two podiums while Chilton and Kimball struggled.

Beginning in the 2017 season, Ganassi changed engine suppliers back to full-works Honda in a bid for serious title contender, retaining their four drivers and thus earned full-factory support from Honda. Also, 2017 marked the end of Target sponsorship in Indycar, as a new chairman elected to change the retail giant's sporting sponsorships.

For 2018, Ganassi would downsize to two cars, with Kimball and Chilton taking their sponsorship over to Carlin due to the team's cost-efficiency. Scott Dixon remains in the No. 9 with sponsorship from PNC Bank. In addition, Ganassi signed the 2017 Indycar Rookie of the Year Ed Jones to drive the No. 10 car in 2018, with sponsorship from NTT Data, replacing Tony Kanaan. Dixon would win his fifth IndyCar title on the strength of wins at Detroit, Texas, and Toronto. Jones would only have two podiums and was released at season's end in favor of Formula E driver Felix Rosenqvist.

For the 2019 season, Dixon would again find victory at Detroit as well as Mid-Ohio, but an inconsistent season would leave him a distant fourth in points. Rosenqvist would have a consistent season, fending off Colton Herta for Rookie of the Year honors. The 2020 season saw the return of its No. 8 entry, driven by former Alfa Romeo Racing driver Marcus Ericsson.

Scott Dixon started the delayed 2020 season very strong, winning the first three races at Texas, Indianapolis, and Road America. Dixon also went on to win at Gateway en route to his 6th Indycar championship. In the No. 10, Rosenqvist would score his first win at Road America.

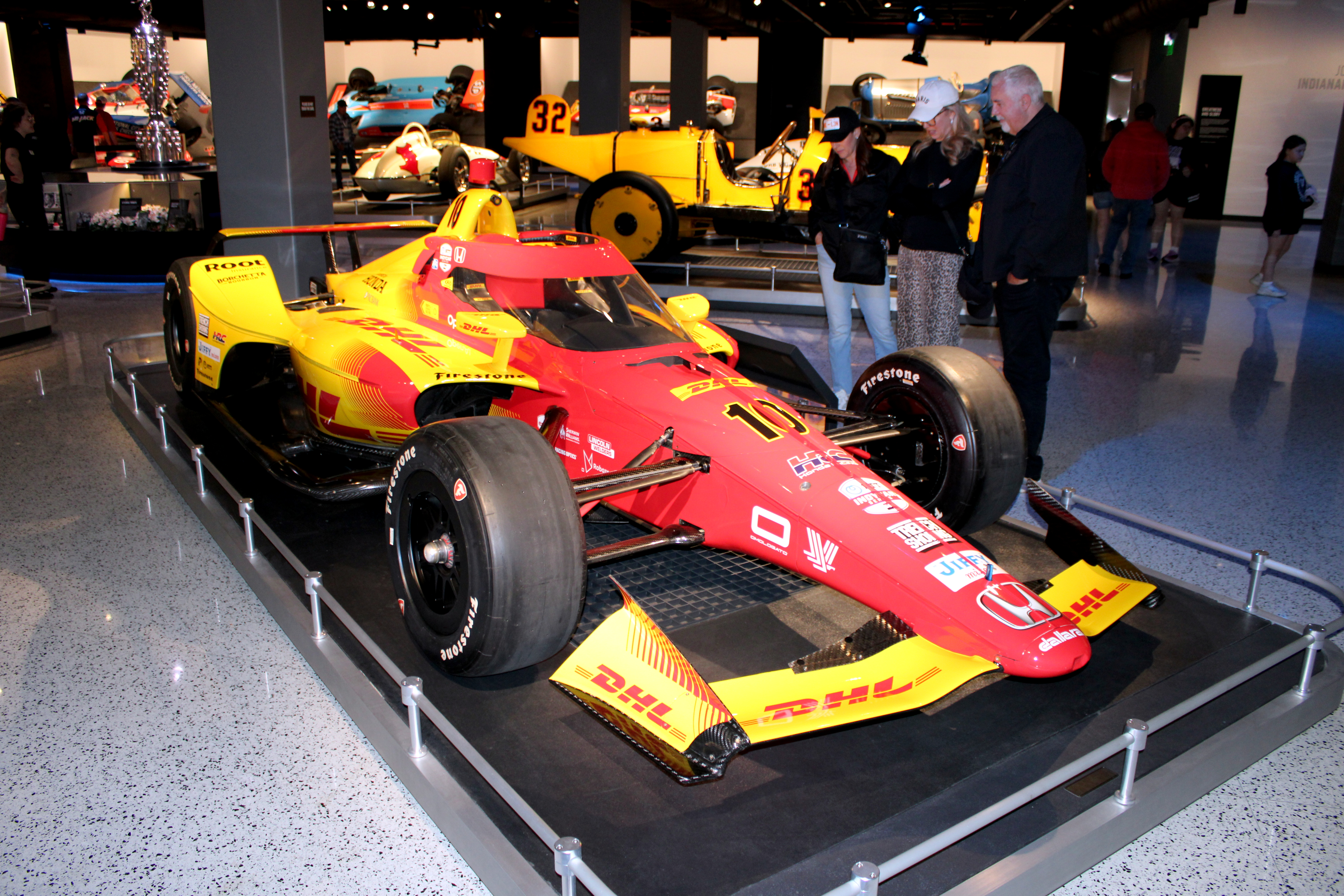
Álex Palou's 2025 DHL Chip Ganassi Racing Dallara IR-18 on display at the Indianapolis Motor Speedway Museum

For 2021, Felix Rosenqvist left the team to join Arrow McLaren SP with Alex Palou taking his seat. The team also expanded to 4 cars for the first time since 2017 with 7 time NASCAR Cup Series champion Jimmie Johnson driving the road and street courses in the No. 48 car. For the ovals, they have former driver Tony Kanaan. The team scored the most wins by any team in the IndyCar series. Dixon would take only one win on the season and was not able his title. His teammates Palou and Ericsson had breakout years. Ericsson took wins at Detroit and the inaugural round at Nashville while Palou would take wins at Barber, Road America, and Portland to win his first IndyCar championship. Palou would become the third Ganassi driver to win the IndyCar Series championship since the team joined the IndyCar Series and the first one other than Dixon since 2011.

After 26 years together, Scott Dixon parted ways with the team, leaving the no. 9 PNC Bank Honda vacant for 2027.

=== IndyCar champions ===
| Year | Champion | Wins | Chassis | Engine | Tyres |
|---|---|---|---|---|---|
| 1996 | (United States) Jimmy Vasser | 4 | Reynard 96I | Honda HRH V8t | Firestone |
| 1997 | (Italy) Alex Zanardi | 5 | Reynard 97i | Honda HRR V8t | Firestone |
| 1998 | (Italy) Alex Zanardi (2) | 7 | Reynard 98i | Honda HRK V8t | Firestone |
| 1999 | (Colombia) Juan Pablo Montoya **(R)** | 7 | Reynard 99i | Honda HRS V8t | Firestone |
| 2003 | (New Zealand) Scott Dixon | 3 | G-Force GF09 | Toyota Indy V8 | Firestone |
| 2008 | (New Zealand) Scott Dixon (2) | 6 | Dallara IR-05 | Honda HI8R | Firestone |
| 2009 | (United Kingdom) Dario Franchitti | 5 | Dallara IR-05 | Honda HI9R | Firestone |
| 2010 | (United Kingdom) Dario Franchitti (2) | 3 | Dallara IR-05 | Honda HI10R | Firestone |
| 2011 | (United Kingdom) Dario Franchitti (3) | 4 | Dallara IR-05 | Honda HI11R | Firestone |
| 2013 | (New Zealand) Scott Dixon (3) | 4 | Dallara DW12 | Honda HI13TT V6t | Firestone |
| 2015 | (New Zealand) Scott Dixon (4) | 3 | Dallara DW12 | Chevrolet IndyCar V6t | Firestone |
| 2018 | (New Zealand) Scott Dixon (5) | 3 | Dallara DW12 | Honda HI18TT V6t | Firestone |
| 2020 | (New Zealand) Scott Dixon (6) | 4 | Dallara DW12 | Honda HI20TT V6t | Firestone |
| 2021 | (Spain) Álex Palou | 3 | Dallara DW12 | Honda HI21TT V6t | Firestone |
| 2023 | (Spain) Álex Palou (2) | 5 | Dallara DW12 | Honda HI23TT V6t | Firestone |
| 2024 | (Spain) Álex Palou (3) | 2 | Dallara DW12 | Honda HI24TT V6t | Firestone |
| 2025 | (Spain) Álex Palou (4) | 8 | Dallara DW12 | Honda HI25TT V6t | Firestone |
| 2026 | (Spain) Álex Palou (5) | 6 | Dallara DW12 | Honda HI26TT V6t | Firestone |

=== Indianapolis 500 victories ===
| Year | Champion | Chassis | Engine | Tyres |
|---|---|---|---|---|
| 2000 | (Colombia) Juan Pablo Montoya **(R)** | G-Force GF05 | Oldsmobile Aurora V8 | Firestone |
| 2008 | (New Zealand) Scott Dixon | Dallara IR-05 | Honda HI8R | Firestone |
| 2010 | (United Kingdom) Dario Franchitti | Dallara IR-05 | Honda HI9R | Firestone |
| 2012 | (United Kingdom) Dario Franchitti (2) | Dallara DW12 | Honda HI12TT V6t | Firestone |
| 2022 | (Sweden) Marcus Ericsson | Dallara DW12 | Honda HI22TT V6t | Firestone |
| 2025 | (Spain) Álex Palou | Dallara DW12 | Honda HI25TT V6t | Firestone |

=== Indy NXT / Indy Lights ===
On December 20, 2006, Chip Ganassi Racing announced that it would field an Indy Lights team for the first time in 2007, with drivers Chris Festa and Pablo Pérez. Perez was severely injured in a crash in the opening race of the Indy Lights season and was not replaced. Festa finished 10th in points without winning a race in a season dominated by Alex Lloyd who was signed by Chip Ganassi Racing at the end of the season. The team partnered with Integra Motorsports in 2008 fielding a variety of development drivers, notably New Zealanders Marc Williams, and Jonny Reid.

In 2025, the team returned INDY NXT in a two-car effort, fielding Jonathan Browne, Bryce Aron and Niels Koolen and placing the Nos. 9 and 10 into 10th and eighth in the entrants point standings. In December 2025, the team announced an expansion to four cars in 2026, adding James Roe and Carson Etter full-time to the lineup alongside Aron and Koolen.

=== Racing results ===
==== Complete CART FedEx Championship Series results ====
(key) (results in bold indicate pole position; results in italics indicate fastest lap)

| Year | Chassis | Engine | Drivers | No. | 1 | 2 | 3 | 4 | 5 | 6 | 7 | 8 | 9 | 10 | 11 | 12 | 13 | 14 | 15 | 16 | 17 | 18 | 19 | 20 | 21 | Pts Pos | Pos |
|---|---|---|---|---|---|---|---|---|---|---|---|---|---|---|---|---|---|---|---|---|---|---|---|---|---|---|---|
| 1990 | | | | | PHX | LBH | INDY | MIL | DET | POR | CLE | MEA | TOR | MCH | DEN | VAN | MOH | ROA | NAZ | LAG | | | | | | | |
| 1990 | Penske PC-18; Lola T90/00 | Chevrolet 265A V8t | (United States) Eddie Cheever **(R)** | 15 | 7 | 13 | | 11 | 3 | 19 | 16 | 21 | 3 | 4 | 20 | 14 | 4 | 9 | 6 | 10 | | | | | | 10th | 80 |
| 1990 | Penske PC-18; Lola T90/00 | Chevrolet 265A V8t | (United States) Eddie Cheever **(R)** | 25 | | | 8 | | | | | | | | | | | | | | | | | | | 10th | 80 |
| 1991 | | | | | SFR | LBH | PHX | INDY | MIL | DET | POR | CLE | MEA | TOR | MCH | DEN | VAN | MOH | ROA | NAZ | LAG | | | | | | |
| 1991 | Lola T91/00 | Chevrolet 265A V8t | (United States) Eddie Cheever | 8 | 15 | 3 | 8 | 31 | 7 | 12 | 9 | 8 | 5 | 17 | 7 | 4 | 12 | 8 | 7 | 6 | 6 | | | | | 9th | 91 |
| 1992 | | | | | SFR | PHX | LBH | INDY | DET | POR | MIL | NHA | TOR | MCH | CLE | ROA | VAN | MOH | NAZ | LAG | | | | | | | |
| 1992 | Lola T91/00; Lola T92/00 | Ford XB V8t | (Netherlands) Arie Luyendyk | 6 | | | | 15 | | | | | | 14 | | | | | | | | | | | | 41st | 0 |
| 1992 | Lola T91/00; Lola T92/00 | Ford XB V8t | (United States) Robby Gordon **(R)** | 6 | | | | | 17 | 13 | 21 | | 8 | | 8 | 18 | 17 | | | | | | | | | 20th | 10 |
| 1992 | Lola T91/00; Lola T92/00 | Chevrolet 265A V8t | (Belgium) Didier Theys | 6 | | | | | | | | | | | | | | | | 13 | | | | | | 40th | 0 |
| 1992 | Lola T91/00; Lola T92/00 | Ford XB V8t | (United States) Eddie Cheever | 9 | 8 | 2 | 22 | 4 | 11 | 4 | 5 | 16 | 9 | 20 | 11 | 23 | 16 | 12 | 9 | 4 | | | | | | 10th | 80 |
| 1993 | | | | | SFR | PHX | LBH | INDY | MIL | DET | POR | CLE | TOR | MCH | NHA | ROA | VAN | MOH | NAZ | LAG | | | | | | | |
| 1993 | Lola T93/00 | Ford XB V8t | (Netherlands) Arie Luyendyk | 10 | 5 | 6 | 11 | **2** | 22 | 17 | 10 | 10 | 22 | 3 | 25 | 9 | 25 | 5 | 8 | 3 | | | | | | 8th | 90 |
| 1994 | | | | | SFR | PHX | LBH | INDY | MIL | DET | POR | CLE | TOR | MCH | MOH | NHA | VAN | ROA | NAZ | LAG | | | | | | | |
| 1994 | Reynard 94i | Ford XB V8t | (United States) Michael Andretti | 8 | 1* | 20 | 6 | 6 | 4 | 5 | 31 | 18 | 1* | 22 | 5 | 5 | 3 | 17 | 9 | 28 | | | | | | 4th | 118 |
| 1994 | Reynard 94i | Ford XB V8t | (Brazil) Maurício Gugelmin | 88 | 6 | 15 | 7 | 11 | 15 | 8 | 30 | 8 | 20 | 15 | 25 | 14 | 5 | 19 | 10 | 22 | | | | | | 16th | 39 |
| 1995 | | | | | MIA | SFR | PHX | LBH | NAZ | INDY | MIL | DET | POR | ROA | TOR | CLE | MCH | MOH | NHA | VAN | LAG | | | | | | |
| 1995 | Reynard 95i | Ford XB V8t | (United States) Bryan Herta | 4 | 10 | 15 | **20** | 26 | 23 | 13 | 24 | 27 | 26 | 14 | 27 | 2 | 15 | 5 | 19 | 16 | 25 | | | | | 20th | 30 |
| 1995 | Reynard 95i | Ford XB V8t | (United States) Mike Groff | 4T | | | | | | Wth | | | | | | | | | | | | | | | | N/A | 0 |
| 1995 | Reynard 95i | Ford XB V8t | (United States) Jimmy Vasser | 12 | 8 | 24 | 23 | 23 | 24 | 22 | 9 | 2 | 2 | 3 | 17 | 3 | 7 | 9 | 6 | 27 | 8 | | | | | 8th | 92 |
| 1996 | | | | | MIA | RIO | SFR | LBH | NAZ | 500 | MIL | DET | POR | CLE | TOR | MCH | MOH | ROA | VAN | LAG | | | | | | | |
| 1996 | Reynard 96i | Honda HRH V8t | (Italy) Alex Zanardi **(R)** | 4 | 24 | **4*** | 21 | 24 | 13 | 17* | 13 | 11 | **1*** | 2 | 2* | 21 | **1*** | **3** | **26** | **1*** | | | | | | 3rd | 132 |
| 1996 | Reynard 96i | Honda HRH V8t | (United States) Jimmy Vasser | 12 | 1 | 8 | **1*** | 1 | 7 | **1** | 10 | 12 | 13 | **10** | 8 | **9** | 2 | 6 | 7 | 4 | | | | | | 1st | 154 |
| 1997 | | | | | MIA | SFR | LBH | NAZ | RIO | GAT | MIL | DET | POR | CLE | TOR | MCH | MOH | ROA | VAN | LAG | FON | | | | | | |
| 1997 | Reynard 97i | Honda HRR V8t | (United States) Jimmy Vasser | 1 | 3 | 12 | 9 | 5 | 9 | 5 | 3 | 4 | 19 | 13 | 7 | 24 | 5 | 8 | 2* | 1* | 2 | | | | | 3rd | 144 |
| 1997 | Reynard 97i | Honda HRR V8t | (Italy) Alex Zanardi | 4 | **7** | **4** | 1* | 11 | 4 | 4 | 13 | 26 | 11 | **1** | 2 | 1* | 1* | 1 | **4** | 3 | DNS | | | | | 1st | 195 |
| 1997 | Reynard 97i | Honda HRR V8t | (Netherlands) Arie Luyendyk | 4 | | | | | | | | | | | | | | | | | 24 | | | | | 34th | 0 |
| 1998 | | | | | MIA | MOT | LBH | NAZ | RIO | GAT | MIL | DET | POR | CLE | TOR | MCH | MOH | ROA | VAN | LAG | HOU | SFR | FON | | | | |
| 1998 | Reynard 98i | Honda HRK V8t | (Italy) Alex Zanardi | 1 | 3 | 23 | 1 | 2 | 2* | 1 | 8 | 1* | 1* | 1* | 1 | 3* | 12 | 2 | 4 | 2 | 2 | 1* | 3 | | | 1st | 285 |
| 1998 | Reynard 98i | Honda HRK V8t | (United States) Jimmy Vasser | 12 | 16 | **7** | 8 | 1 | 6 | 4 | 1* | 6 | 8 | **7** | 3 | 2 | 27 | 9 | 26 | 5 | 4 | 24 | 1* | | | 2nd | 169 |
| 1999 | | | | | MIA | MOT | LBH | NAZ | RIO | GAT | MIL | POR | CLE | ROA | TOR | MCH | DET | MOH | CHI | VAN | LAG | HOU | SRF | FON | | | |
| 1999 | Reynard 99i | Honda HRS V8t | (Colombia) Juan Pablo Montoya **(R)** | 4 | 10 | 13 | 1 | **1*** | 1* | **11** | 10* | **2** | **1*** | 13* | 22 | 2 | **17*** | 1 | 1* | **1*** | 8 | **25** | 16 | 4 | | 1st | 212 |
| 1999 | Reynard 99i | Honda HRS V8t | (United States) Jimmy Vasser | 12 | 4 | 12 | 10 | 11 | 27 | 10 | 4 | 12 | 23 | 23 | 8 | **9** | 5 | 4 | 3 | 3 | 18 | 20 | 18 | 5 | | 9th | 104 |
| 2000 | | | | | MIA | LBH | RIO | MOT | NAZ | MIL | DET | POR | CLE | TOR | MCH | CHI | MOH | ROA | VAN | LAG | GAT | HOU | SRF | FON | | | |
| 2000 | Lola B2K/00 | Toyota RV8E V8t | (Colombia) Juan Pablo Montoya | 1 | 23 | 19 | 22 | **7*** | **4*** | **1*** | **18*** | 17 | 6 | 24 | 1 | **12*** | 24 | 16 | 17 | 6 | **1** | 2 | **24** | 10 | | 9th | 126 |
| 2000 | Lola B2K/00 | Toyota RV8E V8t | (United States) Jimmy Vasser | 12 | 4 | 3 | 2 | 21 | 7 | 13 | 7 | 24 | 8 | 9 | 21 | 8 | 21 | 5 | 6 | 8 | 7 | 1 | 3 | 22 | | 6th | 131 |
| 2001 | | | | | MTY | LBH | TEX | NAZ | MOT | MIL | DET | POR | CLE | TOR | MCH | CHI | MOH | ROA | VAN | LAU | ROC | HOU | LAG | SRF | FON | | |
| 2001 | Lola B01/00 | Toyota RV8F V8t | (Brazil) Bruno Junqueira **(R)** | 4 | 22 | 9 | C^{1} | **7** | 24 | 4 | 19 | 23 | 23 | 13 | 9 | 17 | 13 | 1 | 12 | 11 | 25 | 23 | 7 | 21 | 4 | 16th | 68 |
| 2001 | Lola B01/00 | Toyota RV8F V8t | (France) Nicolas Minassian **(R)** | 12 | 11 | 8 | C^{1} | 18 | 15 | 19 | 17 | | | | | | | | | | | | | | | 27th | 7 |
| 2001 | Lola B01/00 | Toyota RV8F V8t | (United States) Memo Gidley | 12 | | | | | | | | 25 | 2* | 17 | 14 | 5 | 11 | 20 | 10 | 14 | 18 | 3 | 2 | 10 | 14 | 17th | 65 |
| 2002 | | | | | MTY | LBH | MOT | MIL | LAG | POR | CHI | TOR | CLE | VAN | MOH | ROA | MTL | DEN | ROC | MIA | SFR | FON | MXC | | | | |
| 2002 | Lola B02/00 | Toyota RV8F V8t | (Brazil) Bruno Junqueira | 4 | 11 | 17 | **1** | 10 | 4 | 2 | 2 | 14 | 13 | 9 | 4 | **3** | 13 | **1*** | 5 | 5 | 14 | 9 | **3** | | | 2nd | 164 |
| 2002 | Lola B02/00 | Toyota RV8F V8t | (Sweden) Kenny Bräck | 12 | 18 | 5 | 17 | 8 | 3 | 15 | 18 | 2 | 4 | 18 | 6 | 14 | 18 | 7 | **8*** | 13 | 4 | 12 | 1 | | | 6th | 114 |
| 2002 | Lola B02/00 | Toyota RV8F V8t | (New Zealand) Scott Dixon | 44 | | | | 6 | 6 | 7 | 6 | 5 | 15 | 16 | 5 | 17 | 10 | 2 | 12 | 18 | 15 | 6 | 7 | | | 13th | 85 |

- ^{1} The Firestone Firehawk 600 was canceled after qualifying due to excessive g-forces on the drivers.

==== Complete IndyCar Series results ====
(key)

| Year | Chassis | Engine | Drivers | No. | 1 | 2 | 3 | 4 | 5 | 6 | 7 | 8 | 9 | 10 | 11 | 12 | 13 | 14 | 15 | 16 | 17 | 18 | 19 | Pts Pos | Pos |
|---|---|---|---|---|---|---|---|---|---|---|---|---|---|---|---|---|---|---|---|---|---|---|---|---|---|
| 2000 | | | | | WDW | PHX | LSV | INDY | TXS | PPIR | ATL | KTY | TXS | | | | | | | | | | | | |
| 2000 | G-Force GF05 | Oldsmobile Aurora V8 | (Colombia) Juan Pablo Montoya | 9 | | | | 1* | | | | | | | | | | | | | | | | 25th | 54 |
| 2000 | G-Force GF05 | Oldsmobile Aurora V8 | (United States) Jimmy Vasser | 10 | | | | 7 | | | | | | | | | | | | | | | | 32nd | 26 |
| 2001 | | | | | PHX | HMS | ATL | INDY | TXS | PPIR | RIR | KAN | NSH | KTY | GAT | CHI | TXS | | | | | | | | |
| 2001 | G-Force GF05B | Oldsmobile Aurora V8 | (United States) Tony Stewart | 33 | | | | 6 | | | | | | | | | | | | | | | | 39th | 28 |
| 2001 | G-Force GF05B | Oldsmobile Aurora V8 | (United States) Jimmy Vasser | 44 | | | | 4 | | | | | | | | | | | | | | | | 36th | 32 |
| 2001 | G-Force GF05B | Oldsmobile Aurora V8 | (France) Nicolas Minassian | 49 | | | | 29 | | | | | | | | | | | | | | | | 47th | 1 |
| 2001 | G-Force GF05B | Oldsmobile Aurora V8 | (Brazil) Bruno Junqueira | 50 | | | | 5 | | | | | | | | | | | | | | | | 37th | 30 |
| 2002 | | | | | HMS | PHX | FON | NAZ | INDY | TXS | PPIR | RIR | KAN | NSH | MCH | KTY | GAT | CHI | TXS | | | | | | |
| 2002 | G-Force GF05C | Chevrolet Indy V8 | (United States) Jeff Ward | 9 | 4 | 18 | 10 | 19 | 9 | 1 | 20 | 8 | 12 | 11 | 25 | 16 | 13 | 21 | 25 | | | | | 11th | 268 |
| 2002 | G-Force GF05C | Chevrolet Indy V8 | (Sweden) Kenny Bräck | 22 | | | | | 11 | | | | | | | | | | | | | | | 42nd | 19 |
| 2002 | G-Force GF05C | Chevrolet Indy V8 | (Brazil) Bruno Junqueira | 33 | | | | | **31** | | | | | | | | | | | | | | | 51st | 1 |
| 2003 | | | | | HMS | PHX | MOT | INDY | TXS | PPIR | RIR | KAN | NSH | MCH | GAT | KTY | NAZ | CHI | FON | TXS | | | | | |
| 2003 | G-Force GF09 | Toyota Indy V8 | (New Zealand) Scott Dixon | 9 | 1 | 20 | **15** | 17 | 6 | 1* | **1*** | **6** | **2** | 5 | 15 | 2 | **16** | 2 | 2 | 2 | | | | 1st | 507 |
| 2003 | G-Force GF09 | Toyota Indy V8 | (South Africa) Tomas Scheckter | 10 | 8 | 15 | 16 | 4* | **18*** | 8 | 18 | 9 | 10 | **3** | 4 | 10 | 19 | 5* | 5* | 15 | | | | 7th | 356 |
| 2004 | | | | | HMS | PHX | MOT | INDY | TXS | RIR | KAN | NSH | MIL | MCH | KTY | PPIR | NAZ | CHI | FON | TXS | | | | | |
| 2004 | G-Force GF09B | Toyota Indy V8 | (New Zealand) Scott Dixon | 1 | 18 | 2 | 5 | 8 | 14 | 8 | 12 | 8 | DNS | 7 | 13 | 20 | 9 | 7 | 8 | 6 | | | | 10th | 355 |
| 2004 | G-Force GF09B | Toyota Indy V8 | (United Kingdom) Darren Manning | 10 | 6 | 5 | 4 | 25 | 8 | 20 | 11 | 4 | 19 | 13 | 10 | 4 | 6 | 15 | DNS | | | | | 11th | 323 |
| 2005 | | | | | HMS | PHX | STP | MOT | INDY | TXS | RIR | KAN | NSH | MIL | MCH | KTY | PPIR | SNM | CHI | WGL | FON | | | | |
| 2005 | Panoz GF09C; Dallara IR-05 | Toyota Indy V8 | (New Zealand) Scott Dixon | 9 | 16 | 12 | 6 | 21 | 24 | 11 | 22 | 18 | 6 | 13 | 19 | 23 | 16 | 7 | 19 | 1* | 10 | | | 13th | 321 |
| 2005 | Panoz GF09C; Dallara IR-05 | Toyota Indy V8 | (United Kingdom) Darren Manning | 10 | 6 | 8 | 9 | 8 | 29 | 17 | 15 | 7 | 20 | 20 | | | | | | | | | | 21st | 186 |
| 2005 | Panoz GF09C; Dallara IR-05 | Toyota Indy V8 | (United States) Jaques Lazier | 10 | | | | | | | | | | | 17 | 15 | DNS | | 16 | | 17 | | | 24th | 67 |
| 2005 | Panoz GF09C; Dallara IR-05 | Toyota Indy V8 | (Italy) Giorgio Pantano | 10 | | | | | | | | | | | | | | 14 | | 4 | | | | 26th | 48 |
| 2005 | Panoz GF09C; Dallara IR-05 | Toyota Indy V8 | (Australia) Ryan Briscoe | 33 | 20 | 19 | 14* | 12 | 10 | 12 | 21 | 21 | 8 | DNS | 10 | 13 | 20 | **19** | 22 | | | | | 19th | 232 |
| 2006 | | | | | HMS | STP | MOT | INDY | WGL | TXS | RIR | KAN | NSH | MIL | MCH | KTY | SNM | CHI | | | | | | | |
| 2006 | Dallara IR-05; Panoz GF09C | Honda HI6R V8 | (New Zealand) Scott Dixon | 9 | 5 | 2 | 9 | 6 | 1 | 2 | 11 | 4 | 1 | 10 | 16 | 2 | **4*** | 2 | | | | | | 4th | 460 |
| 2006 | Dallara IR-05; Panoz GF09C | Honda HI6R V8 | (United Kingdom) Dan Wheldon | 10 | 1 | 16 | 2 | 4* | 15* | 3* | 9 | **2** | **2*** | 8 | 3 | 4* | 6 | 1* | | | | | | 2nd | 475 |
| 2007 | | | | | HMS | STP | MOT | KAN | INDY | MIL | TXS | IOW | RIR | WGL | NSH | MOH | MCH | KTY | SNM | DET | CHI | | | | |
| 2007 | Dallara IR-05 | Honda HI7R V8 | (New Zealand) Scott Dixon | 9 | 2 | 2 | 4 | 4 | 2 | 4 | 12 | **10** | 2 | 1* | **1*** | 1 | 10 | 2 | 1 | 8 | 2 | | | 2nd | 624 |
| 2007 | Dallara IR-05 | Honda HI7R V8 | (United Kingdom) Dan Wheldon | 10 | **1*** | 9 | 2* | 1* | 22 | 3 | 15 | 11 | 3 | 7 | 8 | 10 | 12 | 17 | 7 | 3 | 13 | | | 4th | 466 |
| 2008 | | | | | HMS | STP | MOT | LBH | KAN | INDY | MIL | TXS | IOW | RIR | WGL | NSH | MOH | EDM | KTY | SNM | DET | CHI | SRF^{1} | | |
| 2008 | Dallara IR-05 | Honda HI8R V8 | (New Zealand) Scott Dixon | 9 | **1** | 22 | 3* | | **3*** | **1*** | 2* | **1** | **4** | 3 | 11 | 1 | 3 | 1 | **1*** | 12 | **5** | 2 | 2 | 1st | 646 |
| 2008 | Dallara IR-05 | Honda HI8R V8 | (United Kingdom) Dan Wheldon | 10 | 3 | 12 | 4 | | 1 | 12 | 4 | 4 | 1 | 4 | 24 | 2 | 17 | 7 | 5 | 4 | 20 | 6 | | 4th | 492 |
| 2008 | Dallara IR-05 | Honda HI8R V8 | (United Kingdom) Dario Franchitti | 10 | | | | | | | | | | | | | | | | | | | 16 | N/A | 0 |
| 2009 | | | | | STP | LBH | KAN | INDY | MIL | TXS | IOW | RIR | WGL | TOR | EDM | KTY | MOH | SNM | CHI | MOT | HMS | | | | |
| 2009 | Dallara IR-05 | Honda HI9R V8 | (New Zealand) Scott Dixon | 9 | 16 | 15 | 1* | 6* | 1 | 3 | 5 | 1* | 3 | 4 | 3 | **7*** | 1* | 13 | 2 | **1*** | 3 | | | 2nd | 605 |
| 2009 | Dallara IR-05 | Honda HI9R V8 | (United Kingdom) Dario Franchitti | 10 | 4 | 1* | 18 | 7 | 3 | **5** | 1 | **2** | 15 | **1*** | 5 | 6 | 3 | **1*** | 4 | 2 | **1** | | | 1st | 616 |
| 2010 | | | | | SAO | STP | ALA | LBH | KAN | INDY | TXS | IOW | WGL | TOR | EDM | MOH | SNM | CHI | KTY | MOT | HMS | | | | |
| 2010 | Dallara IR-05 | Honda HI10R V8 | (New Zealand) Scott Dixon | 9 | 6 | 18 | 2 | 4 | 1* | 5 | 4 | 6 | 8 | 20 | 1 | 5 | 2 | 8 | 7 | 6 | 1 | | | 3rd | 547 |
| 2010 | Dallara IR-05 | Honda HI10R V8 | (United Kingdom) Dario Franchitti | 10 | **7*** | 5 | 3 | 12 | 2 | 1* | 5 | 18* | 3 | 2 | 3 | 1 | 3 | 1 | 5 | 2 | **8*** | | | 1st | 602 |
| 2011 | | | | | STP | ALA | LBH | SAO | INDY | TXS | | MIL | IOW | TOR | EDM | MOH | NHM | SNM | BAL | MOT | KTY | LSV | | | |
| 2011 | Dallara IR-05 | Honda HI11R V8 | (New Zealand) Scott Dixon | 9 | 16 | 2 | 18 | 12 | 5* | 2 | 2 | 7 | 3 | 2 | 23 | **1*** | 3 | 5 | 5 | **1*** | 3 | C^{2} | | 3rd | 518 |
| 2011 | Dallara IR-05 | Honda HI11R V8 | (United Kingdom) Dario Franchitti | 10 | 1* | 3 | 3 | 4 | 12 | 1* | 7 | **1*** | 5* | 1 | 3 | 2 | **20*** | 4 | 4 | 8 | 2* | C^{2} | | 1st | 573 |
| 2011 | Dallara IR-05 | Honda HI11R V8 | (United States) Graham Rahal | 38 | 17 | 18 | 13 | 2 | 3 | 9 | 30 | 2 | 15 | 13 | 25 | 24 | 26 | 8 | 10 | 12 | 12 | C^{2} | | 9th | 320 |
| 2011 | Dallara IR-05 | Honda HI11R V8 | (United States) Charlie Kimball | 83 | 22 | 10 | 24 | 16 | 13 | 30 | 23 | 14 | 22 | 21 | 19 | 11 | 9 | 26 | 21 | 23 | 13 | C^{2} | | 19th | 233 |
| 2012 | | | | | STP | ALA | LBH | SAO | INDY | DET | TEX | MIL | IOW | TOR | EDM | MOH | SNM | BAL | FON | | | | | | |
| 2012 | Dallara DW12 | Honda HI12TT V6t | (New Zealand) Scott Dixon | 9 | 2* | 2* | 23 | 17 | 2 | **1*** | 18* | 11 | 4 | 25 | 10 | 1 | 13 | 4 | 3 | | | | | 3rd | 435 |
| 2012 | Dallara DW12 | Honda HI12TT V6t | (United Kingdom) Dario Franchitti | 10 | 13 | 10 | 15 | 5 | | 2 | 14 | **19** | **25** | **17** | 6 | 17 | 3 | 13 | 2 | | | | | 7th | 363 |
| 2012 | Dallara DW12 | Honda HI12TT V6t | (United Kingdom) Dario Franchitti | 50 | | | | | 1 | | | | | | | | | | | | | | | 7th | 363 |
| 2012 | Dallara DW12 | Honda HI12TT V6t | (United States) Graham Rahal | 38 | 12 | 4 | 24 | 16 | 13 | 19 | 2 | 9 | 9 | 23 | 4 | 11 | 5 | 11 | 6 | | | | | 10th | 333 |
| 2012 | Dallara DW12 | Honda HI12TT V6t | (United States) Charlie Kimball | 83 | 9 | 25 | 18 | 8 | 8 | 8 | 23 | 17 | 11 | 2 | 19 | | 21 | 18 | 10 | | | | | 19th | 260 |
| 2012 | Dallara DW12 | Honda HI12TT V6t | (Italy) Giorgio Pantano | 83 | | | | | | | | | | | | 14 | | | | | | | | 31st | 16 |
| 2013 | | | | | STP | ALA | LBH | SAO | INDY | DET | | TXS | MIL | IOW | POC | TOR | | MOH | SNM | BAL | HOU | | FON | | |
| 2013 | Dallara DW12 | Honda HI13TT V6t | (Australia) Ryan Briscoe | 8 | | | | | 12 | | | | | | | | | | | | | | | 26th | 22 |
| 2013 | Dallara DW12 | Honda HI13TT V6t | (New Zealand) Scott Dixon | 9 | 5 | 2 | 11 | 18 | 14 | 4 | 4 | 23 | 6 | 16 | 1 | 1 | **1*** | 7 | 15* | **19** | 1* | 2 | 5 | 1st | 577 |
| 2013 | Dallara DW12 | Honda HI13TT V6t | (United Kingdom) Dario Franchitti | 10 | 25 | 25 | **4** | 7 | 23 | **6** | 5 | 6 | 8 | 20 | 3 | **3** | 4 | 3 | **3** | 21 | 15 | 15 | | 10th | 418 |
| 2013 | Dallara DW12 | Honda HI13TT V6t | (Canada) Alex Tagliani | 10 | | | | | | | | | | | | | | | | | | | 14 | 24th | 16 |
| 2013 | Dallara DW12 | Honda HI13TT V6t | (United States) Charlie Kimball | 83 | 12 | 4 | 21 | 10 | 9 | 14 | 7 | 17 | 17 | 12 | 2 | 21 | 6 | 1* | 20 | 6 | 11 | 8 | 10 | 9th | 427 |
| 2014 | | | | | STP | LBH | ALA | IMS | INDY | DET | | TXS | HOU | | POC | IOW | TOR | | MOH | MIL | SNM | FON | | | |
| 2014 | Dallara DW12 | Chevrolet IndyCar V6t | (Australia) Ryan Briscoe | 8 | 10 | 17 | 11 | 6 | 18 | 15 | 10 | 9 | 12 | 8 | 4 | 9 | 12 | 11 | 8 | 6 | 17 | 7 | | 11th | 461 |
| 2014 | Dallara DW12 | Chevrolet IndyCar V6t | (New Zealand) Scott Dixon | 9 | 4 | 12 | 3 | 15 | 29 | 11 | 4 | 5 | 19 | 18 | 5 | **4** | 5 | 7 | 1* | 4 | 1 | 2 | | 3rd | 604 |
| 2014 | Dallara DW12 | Chevrolet IndyCar V6t | (Brazil) Tony Kanaan | 10 | 6 | 18 | 9 | 10 | 26 | 3 | 9 | 6 | 13 | 10 | 11* | 3* | 3 | 2 | 21 | 3 | 13 | 1 | | 7th | 544 |
| 2014 | Dallara DW12 | Chevrolet IndyCar V6t | (United States) Charlie Kimball | 83 | 20 | 23 | 10 | 5 | 31 | 9 | 3 | 10 | 18 | 4 | 17 | 10 | 7 | 4 | 7 | 16 | 21 | 12 | | 14th | 402 |
| 2015 | | | | | STP | NOL | LBH | ALA | IMS | INDY | DET | | TXS | TOR | FON | MIL | IOW | MOH | POC | SNM | | | | | |
| 2015 | Dallara DW12 | Chevrolet IndyCar V6t | (United States) Sage Karam | 8 | 19 | 18 | | 18 | | 32 | 16 | 12 | 12 | | 5 | 19 | 3 | 22 | 14 | | | | | 20th | 197 |
| 2015 | Dallara DW12 | Chevrolet IndyCar V6t | (Colombia) Sebastián Saavedra | 8 | | | 10 | | 17 | | | | | 16 | | | | | | 13 | | | | 25th | 96 |
| 2015 | Dallara DW12 | Chevrolet IndyCar V6t | (Colombia) Sebastián Saavedra | 17 | | | | | | 23 | | | | | | | | | | | | | | 25th | 96 |
| 2015 | Dallara DW12 | Chevrolet IndyCar V6t | (New Zealand) Scott Dixon | 9 | 15 | 11 | 1* | 3 | 10 | **4*** | 5 | 20 | 1* | 8 | 6 | 7 | 18 | **4** | 9 | 1* | | | | 1st | 556 |
| 2015 | Dallara DW12 | Chevrolet IndyCar V6t | (Brazil) Tony Kanaan | 10 | 3 | 6 | 5 | 13 | 7 | 26 | 20 | 13 | 2 | 6 | 2 | 6 | 21 | 5 | 19 | 4 | | | | 8th | 431 |
| 2015 | Dallara DW12 | Chevrolet IndyCar V6t | (United States) Charlie Kimball | 83 | 21 | 14 | 15 | 12 | 5 | 3 | 22 | 11 | 7 | 20 | 8 | 12 | 22 | 23 | 12 | 3 | | | | 12th | 372 |
| 2016 | | | | | STP | PHX | LBH | ALA | IMS | INDY | DET | | ROA | IOW | TOR | MOH | POC | TXS | WGL | SNM | | | | | |
| 2016 | Dallara DW12 | Chevrolet IndyCar V6t | (United Kingdom) Max Chilton | 8 | 17 | 7 | 14 | 21 | 14 | 15 | 21 | 22 | 20 | 19 | 18 | 16 | 13 | 15 | 10 | 16 | | | | 19th | 267 |
| 2016 | Dallara DW12 | Chevrolet IndyCar V6t | (New Zealand) Scott Dixon | 9 | 7 | 1* | 2 | 10 | 7 | 8 | 19 | 5 | 22 | 3 | **8*** | 22 | 6 | 19 | **1*** | 17 | | | | 6th | 477 |
| 2016 | Dallara DW12 | Chevrolet IndyCar V6t | (Brazil) Tony Kanaan | 10 | 9 | 4 | 6 | 8 | 25 | 4 | 9 | 7 | 2 | 7 | 4 | 12 | 9 | 3 | 12 | 13 | | | | 7th | 461 |
| 2016 | Dallara DW12 | Chevrolet IndyCar V6t | (United States) Charlie Kimball | 42 | | | | | | 5 | | | | | | | | | | | | | | 9th | 433 |
| 2016 | Dallara DW12 | Chevrolet IndyCar V6t | (United States) Charlie Kimball | 83 | 10 | 12 | 11 | 9 | 5 | | 8 | 16 | 6 | 10 | 11 | 8 | 15 | 6 | 6 | 9 | | | | 9th | 433 |
| 2017 | | | | | STP | LBH | ALA | PHX | IMS | INDY | DET | | TEX | ROA | IOW | TOR | MOH | POC | GAT | WGL | SNM | | | | |
| 2017 | Dallara DW12 | Honda HI17TT V6t | (United Kingdom) Max Chilton | 8 | 16 | 14 | 12 | 20 | 7 | 4* | 11 | 15 | 8 | 9 | 14 | 7 | 15 | 18 | 17 | 8 | 12 | | | 11th | 396 |
| 2017 | Dallara DW12 | Honda HI17TT V6t | (New Zealand) Scott Dixon | 9 | 3 | 4* | 2 | 5 | 2 | **32** | 2 | 6 | 9 | 1* | 8 | 10 | 9 | 6* | 2 | 2 | 4 | | | 3rd | 621 |
| 2017 | Dallara DW12 | Honda HI17TT V6t | (Brazil) Tony Kanaan | 10 | 12 | 15 | 7 | 6 | 20 | 5 | 15 | 10 | 2 | 21 | 9 | 19 | 16 | 5 | 16 | 20 | 16 | | | 10th | 403 |
| 2017 | Dallara DW12 | Honda HI17TT V6t | (United States) Charlie Kimball | 83 | 18 | 21 | 15 | 8 | 21 | 25 | 21 | 8 | **21** | 6 | 15 | 12 | 13 | 16 | 7 | 7 | 11 | | | 17th | 327 |
| 2018 | | | | | STP | PHX | LBH | ALA | IMS | INDY | DET | | TXS | ROA | IOW | TOR | MOH | POC | GAT | POR | SNM | | | | |
| 2018 | Dallara DW12 | Honda HI18TT V6t | (New Zealand) Scott Dixon | 9 | 6 | 4 | 11 | 6 | 2 | 3 | 1* | 4 | 1* | 3 | 12 | 1* | 5 | 3 | **3*** | 5 | 2 | | | 1st | 678 |
| 2018 | Dallara DW12 | Honda HI18TT V6t | (United Arab Emirates) Ed Jones | 10 | 8 | 20 | 3 | 20 | 22 | 31 | 6 | 3 | 9 | 9 | 13 | 12 | 15 | 12 | 8 | 24 | 10 | | | 13th | 343 |
| 2019 | | | | | STP | COA | ALA | LBH | IMS | INDY | DET | | TXS | ROA | TOR | IOW | MOH | POC | GAT | POR | LAG | | | | |
| 2019 | Dallara DW12 | Honda HI19TT V6t | (New Zealand) Scott Dixon | 9 | 2 | 13 | 2 | 3 | 2* | 17 | 22 | 1* | 17 | 5 | 2 | 2 | 1* | 2 | 20 | 16 | 3 | | | 4th | 578 |
| 2019 | Dallara DW12 | Honda HI19TT V6t | (Sweden) Felix Rosenqvist **(R)** | 10 | 4 | 23 | 10 | 10 | **8** | 28 | 4 | 16 | 12 | 6 | 5 | 14 | 2 | 22 | 11 | 2 | 5 | | | 6th | 425 |
| 2020 | | | | | TXS | IMS | ROA | | IOW | | INDY | GAT | | MOH | | IMS | | STP | | | | | | | |
| 2020 | Dallara DW12 | Honda HI20TT V6t | (Sweden) Marcus Ericsson | 8 | 19 | 6 | 10 | 4 | 9 | 9 | 32 | 5 | 23 | 15 | 5 | 10 | 15 | 7 | | | | | | 12th | 291 |
| 2020 | Dallara DW12 | Honda HI20TT V6t | (New Zealand) Scott Dixon | 9 | 1* | 1 | 1 | 12 | 2 | 5 | 2* | 1 | 5 | 10 | 10 | 9 | 8 | 3 | | | | | | 1st | 537 |
| 2020 | Dallara DW12 | Honda HI20TT V6t | (Sweden) Felix Rosenqvist | 10 | 20 | 15 | 18 | 1 | 14 | 15 | 12 | 8 | 7 | 6 | 22 | 5 | 11 | 18 | | | | | | 11th | 306 |
| 2021 | | | | | ALA | STP | TXS | | IMS | INDY | DET | | ROA | MOH | NSH | IMS | GAT | POR | LAG | LBH | | | | | |
| 2021 | Dallara DW12 | Honda HI21TT V6t | (Sweden) Marcus Ericsson | 8 | 8 | 7 | 19 | 12 | 10 | 11 | 1 | 9 | 6 | 2 | 1 | 9 | 9 | 7 | 6 | 28 | | | | 6th | 435 |
| 2021 | Dallara DW12 | Honda HI21TT V6t | (New Zealand) Scott Dixon | 9 | 3 | 5 | 1* | **4*** | 9 | **17** | 8 | 7 | 4 | 4 | 2 | 17 | 19 | 3 | 13 | 3 | | | | 4th | 481 |
| 2021 | Dallara DW12 | Honda HI21TT V6t | (Spain) Álex Palou | 10 | 1* | 17 | **4** | 7 | 3 | 2 | 15 | 3 | 1 | 3 | 7 | 27 | 20 | **1** | 2 | 4 | | | | 1st | 549 |
| 2021 | Dallara DW12 | Honda HI21TT V6t | (United States) Jimmie Johnson **(R)** | 48 | 19 | 22 | | | 24 | | 24 | 21 | 22 | 22 | 26 | 19 | | 20 | 17 | 17 | | | | 26th | 108 |
| 2021 | Dallara DW12 | Honda HI21TT V6t | (Brazil) Tony Kanaan | 48 | | | 11 | 15 | | 10 | | | | | | | 13 | | | | | | | 28th | 96 |
| 2022 | | | | | STP | TXS | LBH | ALA | IMS | INDY | DET | ROA | MOH | TOR | IOW | | IMS | NSH | GAT | POR | LAG | | | | |
| 2022 | Dallara DW12 | Honda HI22TT V6t | (Brazil) Tony Kanaan | 1 | | | | | | 3 | | | | | | | | | | | | | | 26th | 78 |
| 2022 | Dallara DW12 | Honda HI22TT V6t | (Sweden) Marcus Ericsson | 8 | 9 | 3 | 22 | 12 | 4 | 1 | 7 | 2 | 6 | 5 | 8 | 6 | 11 | 14 | 7 | 11 | 9 | | | 6th | 506 |
| 2022 | Dallara DW12 | Honda HI22TT V6t | (New Zealand) Scott Dixon | 9 | 8 | 5 | 6 | 5 | 10 | **21*** | 3 | 9 | 5 | 1* | 5 | 4 | 8 | 1 | 8 | 3 | 12 | | | 3rd | 521 |
| 2022 | Dallara DW12 | Honda HI22TT V6t | (Spain) Álex Palou | 10 | 2 | 7 | 3 | 2 | 18 | 9 | 6 | 27 | 2 | 6 | 6 | 13 | 10 | 3* | 9 | 12 | 1* | | | 5th | 510 |
| 2022 | Dallara DW12 | Honda HI22TT V6t | (United States) Jimmie Johnson | 48 | 23 | 6 | 20 | 24 | 22 | 28 | 22 | 24 | 16 | 21 | 11 | 5 | 22 | 18 | 14 | 24 | 16 | | | 21st | 214 |
| 2023 | | | | | STP | TXS | LBH | ALA | IMS | INDY | DET | ROA | MOH | TOR | IOW | | NSH | IMS | GAT | POR | LAG | | | | |
| 2023 | Dallara DW12 | Honda HI23TT V6t | (Sweden) Marcus Ericsson | 8 | 1 | 8 | 3 | 10 | 8 | 2 | 9 | 6 | 27 | 11 | 4 | 9 | 7 | 10 | 10 | 7 | 15 | | | 6th | 438 |
| 2023 | Dallara DW12 | Honda HI23TT V6t | (New Zealand) Scott Dixon | 9 | 3 | 5 | 27 | 7 | 6 | 6 | 4 | 4 | 2 | 4 | 6 | 6 | 5 | 1 | 1* | 3 | 1 | | | 2nd | 578 |
| 2023 | Dallara DW12 | Honda HI23TT V6t | (Spain) Álex Palou | 10 | 8 | 3 | 5 | 5 | 1* | **4** | **1*** | 1 | 1 | 2 | 8 | 3 | 3 | 7 | 7 | 1* | 3* | | | 1st | 656 |
| 2023 | Dallara DW12 | Honda HI23TT V6t | (New Zealand) Marcus Armstrong **(R)** | 11 | 11 | | 8 | 11 | 15 | | 8 | 24 | 9 | 7 | | | 13 | 24 | | 19 | 8 | | | 20th | 214 |
| 2023 | Dallara DW12 | Honda HI23TT V6t | (Japan) Takuma Sato | 11 | | 28 | | | | 7 | | | | | 9 | 25 | | | 26 | | | | | 29th | 70 |
| 2024 | | | | | STP | THE^{1} | LBH | ALA | IMS | INDY | DET | ROA | LAG | MOH | IOW | | TOR | GAT | POR | MIL | | NSH | | | |
| 2024 | Dallara DW12 | Honda HI24TT V6t | (Cayman Islands) Kyffin Simpson **(R)** | 4 | 12 | DNQ | 19 | 14 | 15 | 21 | 24 | 27 | 23 | 21 | 14 | 18 | 22 | 25 | 16 | 25 | 13 | 22 | | 21st | 182 |
| 2024 | Dallara DW12 | Honda HI24TT V6t | (Sweden) Linus Lundqvist **(R)** | 8 | 21 | 6 | 13 | 3 | 24 | 28 | 22 | **12** | 17 | 15 | 21 | 12 | 13 | 3 | 23 | 6 | 20 | 8 | | 16th | 279 |
| 2024 | Dallara DW12 | Honda HI24TT V6t | (New Zealand) Scott Dixon | 9 | 7 | DNQ | 1* | 15 | 4 | 3 | 1* | 21 | 6 | 27 | 4 | 4 | 3 | 11 | 28 | 10 | 2 | 17 | | 6th | 456 |
| 2024 | Dallara DW12 | Honda HI24TT V6t | (Spain) Álex Palou | 10 | 4 | **1*** | 3 | 5 | **1*** | 5 | 16 | 4 | **1*** | **2*** | 23 | 2* | 4 | 4 | 2 | 5 | 19 | 11 | | 1st | 544 |
| 2024 | Dallara DW12 | Honda HI24TT V6t | (New Zealand) Marcus Armstrong | 11 | 25 | 5 | 12 | 9 | 5 | 30 | 3 | 26 | 22 | 17 | 10 | 19 | 5 | 8 | 5 | 21 | 26 | 7 | | 14th | 298 |
| 2025 | | | | | STP | THE | LBH | ALA | IGP | INDY | DET | GAT | ROA | MOH | IOW | | TOR | LAG | POR | MIL | NSH | | | | |
| 2025 | Dallara DW12 | Honda HI25TT V6t | (Cayman Islands) Kyffin Simpson | 8 | 18 | 15 | 10 | 21 | 27 | 25 | 5 | 15 | 6 | 10 | 18 | 13 | 3 | 27 | 21 | 20 | 4 | | | 17th | 282 |
| 2025 | Dallara DW12 | Honda HI25TT V6t | (New Zealand) Scott Dixon | 9 | 2 | 10 | 8 | 12 | 5 | 20 | 11 | 4 | 9* | 1 | 10 | 2 | 10 | 5 | 11 | 9 | 12 | | | 3rd | 452 |
| 2025 | Dallara DW12 | Honda HI25TT V6t | (Spain) Álex Palou | 10 | 1 | 1 | 2 | **1*** | **1** | 1 | 25 | 8 | 1 | **2*** | 5 | **1*** | 12* | **1*** | 3 | **2*** | 2 | | | 1st | 711 |
| 2026 | | | | | STP | PHX | ARL | ALA | LBH | IMS | INDY | DET | GAT | ROA | MOH | NSH | POR | MAR | D.C. | MIL | | LAG | | | |
| 2026 | Dallara DW12 | Honda HI26TT V6t | (Cayman Islands) Kyffin Simpson | 8 | 15 | 10 | 20 | 20 | 10 | 12 | 14 | 9 | 21 | 4 | 15 | 9 | 10 | 14 | 5 | 16 | 19 | 10 | | 13th | 327 |
| 2026 | Dallara DW12 | Honda HI26TT V6t | (New Zealand) Scott Dixon | 9 | 23 | 7 | 8 | 7 | 3 | 6 | 15 | 24 | 12 | 11 | 17 | 18 | 14 | 18 | 7 | 18 | 15 | 17 | | 12th | 331 |
| 2026 | Dallara DW12 | Honda HI26TT V6t | (Spain) Álex Palou | 10 | 1* | 24 | 2 | **1*** | 1 | **5** | **7*** | **1*** | **17** | **5** | 5 | 1* | 1* | 5 | **20** | 10 | **5*** | 8 | | 1st | 631 |

* Season still in progress

1. Non-points-paying, exhibition race.
2. The final race at Las Vegas was canceled due to Dan Wheldon's death.

==== IndyCar wins ====
IndyCar wins
| # | Season | Date | Sanction | Track / Race | No. | Winning driver | Chassis | Engine | Tire | Grid | Laps Led |
|---|---|---|---|---|---|---|---|---|---|---|---|
| 1 | 1994 | March 20 | CART | Gold Coast Indy 300 **(S)** | 8 | (United States) Michael Andretti | Reynard 94i | Ford XB V8t | Goodyear | 2 | 55 |
| 2 | 1994 | July 17 | CART | Exhibition Place, Toronto **(S)** | 8 | (United States) Michael Andretti (2) | Reynard 94i | Ford XB V8t | Goodyear | 6 | 71 |
| 3 | 1996 | March 3 | CART | Grand Prix of Miami **(O)** | 12 | (United States) Jimmy Vasser | Reynard 96i | Honda HRH V8t | Firestone | 3 | 32 |
| 4 | 1996 | March 31 | CART | Gold Coast Indy 300 **(S)** | 12 | (United States) Jimmy Vasser (2) | Reynard 96i | Honda HRH V8t | Firestone | **Pole** | 60 |
| 5 | 1996 | April 14 | CART | Grand Prix of Long Beach **(S)** | 12 | (United States) Jimmy Vasser (3) | Reynard 96i | Honda HRH V8t | Firestone | 3 | 4 |
| 6 | 1996 | May 26 | CART | U.S. 500 **(O)** | 12 | (United States) Jimmy Vasser (4) | Reynard 96i | Honda HRH V8t | Firestone | **Pole** | 35 |
| 7 | 1996 | June 23 | CART | Grand Prix of Portland **(R)** | 4 | (Italy) Alex Zanardi **(R)** | Reynard 96i | Honda HRH V8t | Firestone | **Pole** | 95 |
| 8 | 1996 | August 11 | CART | Mid-Ohio Sports Car Course **(R)** | 4 | (Italy) Alex Zanardi **(R)** (2) | Reynard 96i | Honda HRH V8t | Firestone | **Pole** | 79 |
| 9 | 1996 | September 8 | CART | Laguna Seca Raceway **(R)** | 4 | (Italy) Alex Zanardi **(R)** (3) | Reynard 96i | Honda HRH V8t | Firestone | **Pole** | 41 |
| 10 | 1997 | April 13 | CART | Grand Prix of Long Beach **(S)** | 4 | (Italy) Alex Zanardi (4) | Reynard 97i | Honda HRR V8t | Firestone | 2 | 41 |
| 11 | 1997 | July 13 | CART | Grand Prix of Cleveland **(S)** | 4 | (Italy) Alex Zanardi (5) | Reynard 97i | Honda HRR V8t | Firestone | **Pole** | 30 |
| 12 | 1997 | July 27 | CART | Michigan 500 **(O)** | 4 | (Italy) Alex Zanardi (6) | Reynard 97i | Honda HRR V8t | Firestone | 7 | 104 |
| 13 | 1997 | August 10 | CART | Mid-Ohio Sports Car Course **(R)** | 4 | (Italy) Alex Zanardi (7) | Reynard 97i | Honda HRR V8t | Firestone | 2 | 56 |
| 14 | 1997 | August 17 | CART | Road America **(R)** | 4 | (Italy) Alex Zanardi (8) | Reynard 97i | Honda HRR V8t | Firestone | 3 | 15 |
| 15 | 1997 | September 7 | CART | Laguna Seca Raceway **(R)** | 1 | (United States) Jimmy Vasser (5) | Reynard 97i | Honda HRR V8t | Firestone | 6 | 58 |
| 16 | 1998 | April 5 | CART | Grand Prix of Long Beach **(S)** | 1 | (Italy) Alex Zanardi (9) | Reynard 98i | Honda HRK V8t | Firestone | 11 | 2 |
| 17 | 1998 | April 27 | CART | Nazareth Speedway **(O)** | 12 | (United States) Jimmy Vasser (6) | Reynard 98i | Honda HRK V8t | Firestone | 5 | 41 |
| 18 | 1998 | May 23 | CART | Gateway International Raceway **(O)** | 1 | (Italy) Alex Zanardi (10) | Reynard 98i | Honda HRK V8t | Firestone | 11 | 61 |
| 19 | 1998 | May 31 | CART | Milwaukee Mile **(O)** | 12 | (United States) Jimmy Vasser (7) | Reynard 98i | Honda HRK V8t | Firestone | 5 | 77 |
| 20 | 1998 | June 7 | CART | Detroit Belle Isle Grand Prix **(S)** | 1 | (Italy) Alex Zanardi (11) | Reynard 98i | Honda HRK V8t | Firestone | 2 | 50 |
| 21 | 1998 | June 21 | CART | Grand Prix of Portland **(R)** | 1 | (Italy) Alex Zanardi (12) | Reynard 98i | Honda HRK V8t | Firestone | 5 | 47 |
| 22 | 1998 | July 12 | CART | Grand Prix of Cleveland **(S)** | 1 | (Italy) Alex Zanardi (13) | Reynard 98i | Honda HRK V8t | Firestone | 3 | 68 |
| 23 | 1998 | July 19 | CART | Exhibition Place, Toronto **(S)** | 1 | (Italy) Alex Zanardi (14) | Reynard 98i | Honda HRK V8t | Firestone | 2 | 3 |
| 24 | 1998 | October 18 | CART | Surfers Paradise **(S)** | 1 | (Italy) Alex Zanardi (15) | Reynard 98i | Honda HRK V8t | Firestone | 2 | 49 |
| 25 | 1998 | November 1 | CART | Fontana 500 **(O)** | 12 | (United States) Jimmy Vasser (8) | Reynard 98i | Honda HRK V8t | Firestone | 2 | 63 |
| 26 | 1999 | April 18 | CART | Grand Prix of Long Beach **(S)** | 4 | (Colombia) Juan Pablo Montoya **(R)** | Reynard 99i | Honda HRS V8t | Firestone | 5 | 40 |
| 27 | 1999 | May 2 | CART | Nazareth Speedway **(O)** | 4 | (Colombia) Juan Pablo Montoya **(R)** (2) | Reynard 99i | Honda HRS V8t | Firestone | **Pole** | 210 |
| 28 | 1999 | May 15 | CART | Rio 200 **(O)** | 4 | (Colombia) Juan Pablo Montoya **(R)** (3) | Reynard 99i | Honda HRS V8t | Firestone | 3 | 93 |
| 29 | 1999 | June 27 | CART | Grand Prix of Cleveland **(S)** | 4 | (Colombia) Juan Pablo Montoya **(R)** (4) | Reynard 99i | Honda HRS V8t | Firestone | **Pole** | 76 |
| 30 | 1999 | August 15 | CART | Mid-Ohio Sports Car Course **(R)** | 4 | (Colombia) Juan Pablo Montoya **(R)** (5) | Reynard 99i | Honda HRS V8t | Firestone | 8 | 28 |
| 31 | 1999 | August 22 | CART | Chicago Motor Speedway **(O)** | 4 | (Colombia) Juan Pablo Montoya **(R)** (6) | Reynard 99i | Honda HRS V8t | Firestone | 10 | 132 |
| 32 | 1999 | September 5 | CART | Streets of Vancouver **(S)** | 4 | (Colombia) Juan Pablo Montoya **(R)** (7) | Reynard 99i | Honda HRS V8t | Firestone | **Pole** | 73 |
| 33 | 2000 | May 28 | IRL | Indianapolis 500 **(O)** | 9 | (Colombia) Juan Pablo Montoya **(R)** (8) | G-Force GF05 | Oldsmobile Aurora V8 | Firestone | 2 | 167 |
| 34 | 2000 | June 5 | CART | Milwaukee Mile **(O)** | 1 | (Colombia) Juan Pablo Montoya (9) | Lola B2K/00 | Toyota RV8E V8t | Firestone | **Pole** | 179 |
| 35 | 2000 | July 23 | CART | Michigan 500 **(O)** | 1 | (Colombia) Juan Pablo Montoya (10) | Lola B2K/00 | Toyota RV8E V8t | Firestone | 7 | 39 |
| 36 | 2000 | September 17 | CART | Gateway Motorsports Park **(O)** | 1 | (Colombia) Juan Pablo Montoya (11) | Lola B2K/00 | Toyota RV8E V8t | Firestone | **Pole** | 83 |
| 37 | 2000 | October 1 | CART | Grand Prix of Houston **(S)** | 12 | (United States) Jimmy Vasser (9) | Lola B2K/00 | Toyota RV8E V8t | Firestone | 3 | 31 |
| 38 | 2001 | August 19 | CART | Road America **(R)** | 4 | (Brazil) Bruno Junqueira **(R)** | Lola B01/00 | Toyota RV8F V8t | Firestone | 10 | 11 |
| 39 | 2002 | April 27 | CART | Twin Ring Motegi **(O)** | 4 | (Brazil) Bruno Junqueira (2) | Lola B02/00 | Toyota RV8F V8t | Bridgestone | **Pole** | 54 |
| 40 | 2002 | June 8 | IRL | Texas Motor Speedway **(O)** | 9 | (United States) Jeff Ward | G-Force GF05C | Chevrolet Indy V8 | Firestone | 7 | 1 |
| 41 | 2002 | September 2 | CART | Grand Prix of Denver **(S)** | 4 | (Brazil) Bruno Junqueira (3) | Lola B02/00 | Toyota RV8F V8t | Bridgestone | **Pole** | 100 |
| 42 | 2002 | November 17 | CART | Gran Premio de México **(R)** | 12 | (Sweden) Kenny Bräck | Lola B02/00 | Toyota RV8F V8t | Bridgestone | 6 | 12 |
| 43 | 2003 | March 2 | IndyCar | Homestead–Miami Speedway **(O)** | 9 | (New Zealand) Scott Dixon | G-Force GF09 | Toyota Indy V8 | Firestone | 12 | 53 |
| 44 | 2003 | June 15 | IndyCar | Pikes Peak International Raceway **(O)** | 9 | (New Zealand) Scott Dixon (2) | G-Force GF09 | Toyota Indy V8 | Firestone | 6 | 89 |
| 45 | 2003 | June 28 | IndyCar | Richmond International Raceway **(O)** | 9 | (New Zealand) Scott Dixon (3) | G-Force GF09 | Toyota Indy V8 | Firestone | **Pole** | 206 |
| 46 | 2005 | September 25 | IndyCar | Watkins Glen International **(R)** | 9 | (New Zealand) Scott Dixon (4) | Panoz G-Force GF09C | Toyota Indy V8 | Firestone | 4 | 25 |
| 47 | 2006 | March 26 | IndyCar | Homestead–Miami Speedway **(O)** | 10 | (United Kingdom) Dan Wheldon | Dallara IR-05 | Honda HI6R V8 | Firestone | 6 | 8 |
| 48 | 2006 | June 4 | IndyCar | Watkins Glen International **(R)** | 9 | (New Zealand) Scott Dixon (5) | Panoz G-Force GF09C | Honda HI6R V8 | Firestone | 4 | 9 |
| 49 | 2006 | July 15 | IndyCar | Nashville Superspeedway **(O)** | 9 | (New Zealand) Scott Dixon (6) | Dallara IR-05 | Honda HI6R V8 | Firestone | 3 | 69 |
| 50 | 2006 | September 10 | IndyCar | Chicagoland Speedway **(O)** | 10 | (United Kingdom) Dan Wheldon (2) | Dallara IR-05 | Honda HI6R V8 | Firestone | 3 | 166 |
| 51 | 2007 | March 24 | IndyCar | Homestead–Miami Speedway **(O)** | 10 | (United Kingdom) Dan Wheldon (3) | Dallara IR-05 | Honda HI7R V8 | Firestone | **Pole** | 179 |
| 52 | 2007 | April 29 | IndyCar | Kansas Speedway **(O)** | 10 | (United Kingdom) Dan Wheldon (4) | Dallara IR-05 | Honda HI7R V8 | Firestone | 4 | 177 |
| 53 | 2007 | July 8 | IndyCar | Watkins Glen International **(R)** | 9 | (New Zealand) Scott Dixon (7) | Dallara IR-05 | Honda HI7R V8 | Firestone | 2 | 23 |
| 54 | 2007 | July 15 | IndyCar | Nashville Superspeedway **(O)** | 9 | (New Zealand) Scott Dixon (8) | Dallara IR-05 | Honda HI7R V8 | Firestone | **Pole** | 105 |
| 55 | 2007 | July 22 | IndyCar | Mid-Ohio Sports Car Course **(R)** | 9 | (New Zealand) Scott Dixon (9) | Dallara IR-05 | Honda HI7R V8 | Firestone | 6 | 29 |
| 56 | 2007 | August 26 | IndyCar | Sonoma Raceway **(R)** | 9 | (New Zealand) Scott Dixon (10) | Dallara IR-05 | Honda HI7R V8 | Firestone | 5 | 15 |
| 57 | 2008 | March 29 | IndyCar | Homestead–Miami Speedway **(O)** | 9 | (New Zealand) Scott Dixon (11) | Dallara IR-05 | Honda HI8R V8 | Firestone | **Pole** | 68 |
| 58 | 2008 | April 27 | IndyCar | Kansas Speedway **(O)** | 10 | (United Kingdom) Dan Wheldon (5) | Dallara IR-05 | Honda HI8R V8 | Firestone | 2 | 49 |
| 59 | 2008 | May 25 | IndyCar | Indianapolis 500 **(O)** | 9 | (New Zealand) Scott Dixon (12) | Dallara IR-05 | Honda HI8R V8 | Firestone | **Pole** | 115 |
| 60 | 2008 | June 7 | IndyCar | Texas Motor Speedway **(O)** | 9 | (New Zealand) Scott Dixon (13) | Dallara IR-05 | Honda HI8R V8 | Firestone | **Pole** | 58 |
| 61 | 2008 | June 22 | IndyCar | Iowa Speedway **(O)** | 10 | (United Kingdom) Dan Wheldon (6) | Dallara IR-05 | Honda HI8R V8 | Firestone | 3 | 61 |
| 62 | 2008 | July 12 | IndyCar | Nashville Superspeedway **(O)** | 9 | (New Zealand) Scott Dixon (14) | Dallara IR-05 | Honda HI8R V8 | Firestone | 5 | 53 |
| 63 | 2008 | July 26 | IndyCar | Edmonton Indy **(S)** | 9 | (New Zealand) Scott Dixon (15) | Dallara IR-05 | Honda HI8R V8 | Firestone | 4 | 30 |
| 64 | 2008 | August 9 | IndyCar | Kentucky Speedway **(O)** | 9 | (New Zealand) Scott Dixon (16) | Dallara IR-05 | Honda HI8R V8 | Firestone | **Pole** | 151 |
| 65 | 2009 | April 19 | IndyCar | Grand Prix of Long Beach **(S)** | 10 | (United Kingdom) Dario Franchitti | Dallara IR-05 | Honda HI9R V8 | Firestone | 2 | 51 |
| 66 | 2009 | April 26 | IndyCar | Kansas Speedway **(O)** | 9 | (New Zealand) Scott Dixon (17) | Dallara IR-05 | Honda HI9R V8 | Firestone | 4 | 134 |
| 67 | 2009 | May 31 | IndyCar | Milwaukee Mile **(O)** | 9 | (New Zealand) Scott Dixon (18) | Dallara IR-05 | Honda HI9R V8 | Firestone | 4 | 27 |
| 68 | 2009 | June 21 | IndyCar | Iowa Speedway **(O)** | 10 | (United Kingdom) Dario Franchitti (2) | Dallara IR-05 | Honda HI9R V8 | Firestone | 4 | 68 |
| 69 | 2009 | June 27 | IndyCar | Richmond International Raceway **(O)** | 9 | (New Zealand) Scott Dixon (19) | Dallara IR-05 | Honda HI9R V8 | Firestone | 2 | 161 |
| 70 | 2009 | July 12 | IndyCar | Exhibition Place, Toronto **(S)** | 10 | (United Kingdom) Dario Franchitti (3) | Dallara IR-05 | Honda HI9R V8 | Firestone | **Pole** | 45 |
| 71 | 2009 | August 9 | IndyCar | Mid-Ohio Sports Car Course **(R)** | 9 | (New Zealand) Scott Dixon (20) | Dallara IR-05 | Honda HI9R V8 | Firestone | 3 | 51 |
| 72 | 2009 | August 23 | IndyCar | Sonoma Raceway **(R)** | 10 | (United Kingdom) Dario Franchitti (4) | Dallara IR-05 | Honda HI9R V8 | Firestone | **Pole** | 75 |
| 73 | 2009 | September 18 | IndyCar | Twin Ring Motegi **(O)** | 9 | (New Zealand) Scott Dixon (21) | Dallara IR-05 | Honda HI9R V8 | Firestone | **Pole** | 139 |
| 74 | 2009 | October 10 | IndyCar | Homestead–Miami Speedway **(O)** | 10 | (United Kingdom) Dario Franchitti (5) | Dallara IR-05 | Honda HI9R V8 | Firestone | **Pole** | 25 |
| 75 | 2010 | May 1 | IndyCar | Kansas Speedway **(O)** | 9 | (New Zealand) Scott Dixon (22) | Dallara IR-05 | Honda HI10R V8 | Firestone | 2 | 167 |
| 76 | 2010 | May 30 | IndyCar | Indianapolis 500 **(O)** | 10 | (United Kingdom) Dario Franchitti (6) | Dallara IR-05 | Honda HI10R V8 | Firestone | 3 | 155 |
| 77 | 2010 | July 25 | IndyCar | Edmonton Indy **(S)** | 9 | (New Zealand) Scott Dixon (23) | Dallara IR-05 | Honda HI10R V8 | Firestone | 3 | 2 |
| 78 | 2010 | August 8 | IndyCar | Mid-Ohio Sports Car Course **(R)** | 10 | (United Kingdom) Dario Franchitti (7) | Dallara IR-05 | Honda HI10R V8 | Firestone | 2 | 29 |
| 79 | 2010 | August 28 | IndyCar | Chicagoland Speedway **(O)** | 10 | (United Kingdom) Dario Franchitti (8) | Dallara IR-05 | Honda HI10R V8 | Firestone | 2 | 28 |
| 80 | 2010 | October 2 | IndyCar | Homestead–Miami Speedway **(O)** | 9 | (New Zealand) Scott Dixon (24) | Dallara IR-05 | Honda HI10R V8 | Firestone | 2 | 47 |
| 81 | 2011 | March 27 | IndyCar | Grand Prix of St. Petersburg **(S)** | 10 | (United Kingdom) Dario Franchitti (9) | Dallara IR-05 | Honda HI11R V8 | Firestone | 2 | 94 |
| 82 | 2011 | June 11 | IndyCar | Texas Motor Speedway **(O)** | 10 | (United Kingdom) Dario Franchitti (10) | Dallara IR-05 | Honda HI11R V8 | Firestone | 2 | 110 |
| 83 | 2011 | June 19 | IndyCar | Milwaukee Mile **(O)** | 10 | (United Kingdom) Dario Franchitti (11) | Dallara IR-05 | Honda HI11R V8 | Firestone | **Pole** | 161 |
| 84 | 2011 | July 10 | IndyCar | Exhibition Place, Toronto **(S)** | 10 | (United Kingdom) Dario Franchitti (12) | Dallara IR-05 | Honda HI11R V8 | Firestone | 3 | 30 |
| 85 | 2011 | August 7 | IndyCar | Mid-Ohio Sports Car Course **(R)** | 9 | (New Zealand) Scott Dixon (25) | Dallara IR-05 | Honda HI11R V8 | Firestone | **Pole** | 50 |
| 86 | 2011 | September 18 | IndyCar | Twin Ring Motegi **(R)** | 9 | (New Zealand) Scott Dixon (26) | Dallara IR-05 | Honda HI11R V8 | Firestone | **Pole** | 62 |
| 87 | 2012 | May 27 | IndyCar | Indianapolis 500 **(O)** | 50 | (United Kingdom) Dario Franchitti (13) | Dallara DW12 | Honda HI12TT V6t | Firestone | 16 | 23 |
| 88 | 2012 | June 3 | IndyCar | Detroit Belle Isle Grand Prix **(S)** | 9 | (New Zealand) Scott Dixon (27) | Dallara DW12 | Honda HI12TT V6t | Firestone | **Pole** | 60 |
| 89 | 2012 | August 5 | IndyCar | Mid-Ohio Sports Car Course **(R)** | 9 | (New Zealand) Scott Dixon (28) | Dallara DW12 | Honda HI12TT V6t | Firestone | 4 | 26 |
| 90 | 2013 | July 7 | IndyCar | Pocono Raceway **(O)** | 9 | (New Zealand) Scott Dixon (29) | Dallara DW12 | Honda HI13TT V6t | Firestone | 17 | 38 |
| 91 | 2013 | July 13 | IndyCar | Exhibition Place Race 1 **(S)** | 9 | (New Zealand) Scott Dixon (30) | Dallara DW12 | Honda HI13TT V6t | Firestone | 5 | 14 |
| 92 | 2013 | July 14 | IndyCar | Exhibition Place, Toronto Race 2 **(S)** | 9 | (New Zealand) Scott Dixon (31) | Dallara DW12 | Honda HI13TT V6t | Firestone | **Pole** | 81 |
| 93 | 2013 | August 4 | IndyCar | Mid-Ohio Sports Car Course **(R)** | 83 | (United States) Charlie Kimball | Dallara DW12 | Honda HI13TT V6t | Firestone | 5 | 46 |
| 94 | 2013 | October 5 | IndyCar | Grand Prix of Houston Race 1 **(S)** | 9 | (New Zealand) Scott Dixon (32) | Dallara DW12 | Honda HI13TT V6t | Firestone | 3 | 44 |
| 95 | 2014 | August 3 | IndyCar | Mid-Ohio Sports Car Course **(R)** | 9 | (New Zealand) Scott Dixon (33) | Dallara DW12 | Chevrolet IndyCar V6t | Firestone | 22 | 45 |
| 96 | 2014 | August 24 | IndyCar | Sonoma Raceway **(R)** | 9 | (New Zealand) Scott Dixon (34) | Dallara DW12 | Chevrolet IndyCar V6t | Firestone | 3 | 3 |
| 97 | 2014 | August 30 | IndyCar | Auto Club Speedway 500 **(O)** | 10 | (Brazil) Tony Kanaan | Dallara DW12 | Chevrolet IndyCar V6t | Firestone | 7 | 64 |
| 98 | 2015 | April 19 | IndyCar | Grand Prix of Long Beach **(S)** | 9 | (New Zealand) Scott Dixon (35) | Dallara DW12 | Chevrolet IndyCar V6t | Firestone | 3 | 44 |
| 99 | 2015 | June 6 | IndyCar | Texas Motor Speedway **(O)** | 9 | (New Zealand) Scott Dixon (36) | Dallara DW12 | Chevrolet IndyCar V6t | Firestone | 7 | 97 |
| 100 | 2015 | August 30 | IndyCar | Sonoma Raceway **(R)** | 9 | (New Zealand) Scott Dixon (37) | Dallara DW12 | Chevrolet IndyCar V6t | Firestone | 9 | 34 |
| 101 | 2016 | April 2 | IndyCar | Phoenix International Raceway **(O)** | 9 | (New Zealand) Scott Dixon (38) | Dallara DW12 | Chevrolet IndyCar V6t | Firestone | 6 | 155 |
| 102 | 2016 | September 4 | IndyCar | Watkins Glen International **(R)** | 9 | (New Zealand) Scott Dixon (39) | Dallara DW12 | Chevrolet IndyCar V6t | Firestone | **Pole** | 50 |
| 103 | 2017 | June 25 | IndyCar | Road America **(R)** | 9 | (New Zealand) Scott Dixon (40) | Dallara DW12 | Honda HI17TT V6t | Firestone | 5 | 24 |
| 104 | 2018 | June 2 | IndyCar | Detroit Belle Isle Grand Prix Race 1 **(S)** | 9 | (New Zealand) Scott Dixon (41) | Dallara DW12 | Honda HI18TT V6t | Firestone | 2 | 39 |
| 105 | 2018 | June 9 | IndyCar | Texas Motor Speedway **(O)** | 9 | (New Zealand) Scott Dixon (42) | Dallara DW12 | Honda HI18TT V6t | Firestone | 7 | 119 |
| 106 | 2018 | July 15 | IndyCar | Exhibition Place, Toronto **(S)** | 9 | (New Zealand) Scott Dixon (43) | Dallara DW12 | Honda HI18TT V6t | Firestone | 2 | 49 |
| 107 | 2019 | June 2 | IndyCar | Detroit Belle Isle Grand Prix Race 2 **(S)** | 9 | (New Zealand) Scott Dixon (44) | Dallara DW12 | Honda HI19TT V6t | Firestone | 6 | 44 |
| 108 | 2019 | July 29 | IndyCar | Mid-Ohio Sports Car Course **(R)** | 9 | (New Zealand) Scott Dixon (45) | Dallara DW12 | Honda HI19TT V6t | Firestone | 8 | 38 |
| 109 | 2020 | June 6 | IndyCar | Texas Motor Speedway **(O)** | 9 | (New Zealand) Scott Dixon (46) | Dallara DW12 | Honda HI20TT V6t | Firestone | 2 | 157 |
| 110 | 2020 | July 4 | IndyCar | Grand Prix of Indianapolis **(R)** | 9 | (New Zealand) Scott Dixon (47) | Dallara DW12 | Honda HI20TT V6t | Firestone | 7 | 26 |
| 111 | 2020 | July 11 | IndyCar | Road America Race 1 **(R)** | 9 | (New Zealand) Scott Dixon (48) | Dallara DW12 | Honda HI20TT V6t | Firestone | 9 | 16 |
| 112 | 2020 | July 12 | IndyCar | Road America Race 2 **(R)** | 10 | (Sweden) Felix Rosenqvist | Dallara DW12 | Honda HI20TT V6t | Firestone | 7 | 8 |
| 113 | 2020 | August 29 | IndyCar | World Wide Technology Raceway Race 1 **(O)** | 9 | (New Zealand) Scott Dixon (49) | Dallara DW12 | Honda HI20TT V6t | Firestone | 3 | 28 |
| 114 | 2021 | April 18 | IndyCar | Barber Motorsports Park **(R)** | 10 | (Spain) Álex Palou | Dallara DW12 | Honda HI21TT V6t | Firestone | 3 | 56 |
| 115 | 2021 | May 1 | IndyCar | Texas Motor Speedway Race 1 **(O)** | 9 | (New Zealand) Scott Dixon (50) | Dallara DW12 | Honda HI21TT V6t | Firestone | 3 | 206 |
| 116 | 2021 | June 12 | IndyCar | Detroit Belle Isle Grand Prix Race 1 **(S)** | 8 | (Sweden) Marcus Ericsson | Dallara DW12 | Honda HI21TT V6t | Firestone | 15 | 5 |
| 117 | 2021 | June 20 | IndyCar | Road America **(R)** | 10 | (Spain) Álex Palou (2) | Dallara DW12 | Honda HI21TT V6t | Firestone | 5 | 5 |
| 118 | 2021 | August 8 | IndyCar | Nashville Street Circuit **(S)** | 8 | (Sweden) Marcus Ericsson (2) | Dallara DW12 | Honda HI21TT V6t | Firestone | 18 | 37 |
| 119 | 2021 | September 12 | IndyCar | Grand Prix of Portland **(R)** | 10 | (Spain) Álex Palou (3) | Dallara DW12 | Honda HI21TT V6t | Firestone | **Pole** | 29 |
| 120 | 2022 | May 29 | IndyCar | Indianapolis Motor Speedway **(O)** | 8 | (Sweden) Marcus Ericsson (3) | Dallara DW12 | Honda HI22TT V6t | Firestone | 5 | 13 |
| 121 | 2022 | July 17 | IndyCar | Exhibition Place, Toronto **(S)** | 9 | (New Zealand) Scott Dixon (51) | Dallara DW12 | Honda HI22TT V6t | Firestone | 2 | 40 |
| 122 | 2022 | August 7 | IndyCar | Nashville Street Circuit **(S)** | 9 | (New Zealand) Scott Dixon (52) | Dallara DW12 | Honda HI22TT V6t | Firestone | 14 | 15 |
| 123 | 2022 | September 11 | IndyCar | WeatherTech Raceway Laguna Seca **(R)** | 10 | (Spain) Álex Palou (4) | Dallara DW12 | Honda HI22TT V6t | Firestone | 11 | 67 |
| 124 | 2023 | March 5 | IndyCar | Grand Prix of St. Petersburg **(S)** | 8 | (Sweden) Marcus Ericsson (4) | Dallara DW12 | Honda HI23TT V6t | Firestone | 4 | 4 |
| 125 | 2023 | May 13 | IndyCar | Grand Prix of Indianapolis **(R)** | 10 | (Spain) Álex Palou (5) | Dallara DW12 | Honda HI23TT V6t | Firestone | 3 | 52 |
| 126 | 2023 | June 4 | IndyCar | Detroit Grand Prix **(S)** | 10 | (Spain) Álex Palou (6) | Dallara DW12 | Honda HI23TT V6t | Firestone | **Pole** | 74 |
| 127 | 2023 | June 18 | IndyCar | Road America **(R)** | 10 | (Spain) Álex Palou (7) | Dallara DW12 | Honda HI23TT V6t | Firestone | 3 | 10 |
| 128 | 2023 | July 2 | IndyCar | Mid-Ohio Sports Car Course **(R)** | 10 | (Spain) Álex Palou (8) | Dallara DW12 | Honda HI23TT V6t | Firestone | 4 | 48 |
| 129 | 2023 | August 12 | IndyCar | Grand Prix of Indianapolis **(R)** | 9 | (New Zealand) Scott Dixon (53) | Dallara DW12 | Honda HI23TT V6t | Firestone | 15 | 34 |
| 130 | 2023 | August 27 | IndyCar | World Wide Technology Raceway **(O)** | 9 | (New Zealand) Scott Dixon (54) | Dallara DW12 | Honda HI23TT V6t | Firestone | 16 | 123 |
| 131 | 2023 | September 3 | IndyCar | Grand Prix of Portland **(R)** | 10 | (Spain) Álex Palou (9) | Dallara DW12 | Honda HI23TT V6t | Firestone | 5 | 69 |
| 132 | 2023 | September 10 | IndyCar | WeatherTech Raceway Laguna Seca **(R)** | 9 | (New Zealand) Scott Dixon (55) | Dallara DW12 | Honda HI23TT V6t | Firestone | 11 | 20 |
| **NC** | 2024 | March 24 | IndyCar | $1 Million Challenge **(R)** | 10 | (Spain) Álex Palou | Dallara DW12 | Honda HI24TT V6t | Firestone | **Pole** | 20 |
| 133 | 2024 | April 21 | IndyCar | Grand Prix of Long Beach **(S)** | 9 | (New Zealand) Scott Dixon (56) | Dallara DW12 | Honda HI24TT V6t | Firestone | 8 | 42 |
| 134 | 2024 | May 11 | IndyCar | Grand Prix of Indianapolis **(R)** | 10 | (Spain) Álex Palou (10) | Dallara DW12 | Honda HI24TT V6t | Firestone | **Pole** | 39 |
| 135 | 2024 | June 2 | IndyCar | Detroit Grand Prix **(S)** | 9 | (New Zealand) Scott Dixon (57) | Dallara DW12 | Honda HI24TT V6t | Firestone | 5 | 35 |
| 136 | 2024 | June 23 | IndyCar | Grand Prix of Monterey **(R)** | 10 | (Spain) Álex Palou (11) | Dallara DW12 | Honda HI24TT V6t | Firestone | **Pole** | 48 |
| 137 | 2025 | March 2 | IndyCar | Grand Prix of St. Petersburg **(R)** | 10 | (Spain) Álex Palou (12) | Dallara DW12 | Honda HI25TT V6t | Firestone | 8 | 25 |
| 138 | 2025 | March 23 | IndyCar | Thermal Club IndyCar Grand Prix **(R)** | 10 | (Spain) Álex Palou (13) | Dallara DW12 | Honda HI25TT V6t | Firestone | 3 | 13 |
| 139 | 2025 | May 4 | IndyCar | Children's of Alabama Indy Grand Prix **(R)** | 10 | (Spain) Álex Palou (14) | Dallara DW12 | Honda HI25TT V6t | Firestone | **Pole** | 81 |
| 140 | 2025 | May 10 | IndyCar | Sonsio Grand Prix **(R)** | 10 | (Spain) Álex Palou (15) | Dallara DW12 | Honda HI25TT V6t | Firestone | **Pole** | 29 |
| 141 | 2025 | May 25 | IndyCar | Indianapolis 500 **(O)** | 10 | (Spain) Álex Palou (16) | Dallara DW12 | Honda HI25TT V6t | Firestone | 6 | 14 |
| 142 | 2025 | June 22 | IndyCar | XPEL Grand Prix at Road America **(R)** | 10 | (Spain) Álex Palou (17) | Dallara DW12 | Honda HI25TT V6t | Firestone | 2 | 6 |
| 143 | 2025 | July 6 | IndyCar | Honda Indy 200 **(R)** | 9 | (New Zealand) Scott Dixon (58) | Dallara DW12 | Honda HI25TT V6t | Firestone | 9 | 11 |
| 144 | 2025 | July 13 | IndyCar | Farm to Finish 275 **(O)** | 10 | (Spain) Álex Palou (18) | Dallara DW12 | Honda HI25TT V6t | Firestone | **Pole** | 194 |
| 145 | 2025 | July 27 | IndyCar | Java House Grand Prix of Monterey **(R)** | 10 | (Spain) Álex Palou (19) | Dallara DW12 | Honda HI25TT V6t | Firestone | **Pole** | 84 |
| 146 | 2026 | March 1 | IndyCar | Grand Prix of St. Petersburg **(R)** | 10 | (Spain) Álex Palou (20) | Dallara DW12 | Honda HI26TT V6t | Firestone | 4 | 59 |
| 147 | 2026 | March 29 | IndyCar | Children's of Alabama Indy Grand Prix **(R)** | 10 | (Spain) Álex Palou (21) | Dallara DW12 | Honda HI26TT V6t | Firestone | **Pole** | 79 |
| 148 | 2026 | April 19 | IndyCar | Grand Prix of Long Beach **(S)** | 10 | (Spain) Álex Palou (22) | Dallara DW12 | Honda HI26TT V6t | Firestone | 3 | 32 |
| 149 | 2026 | May 31 | IndyCar | Detroit Grand Prix **(S)** | 10 | (Spain) Álex Palou (23) | Dallara DW12 | Honda HI26TT V6t | Firestone | **Pole** | 71 |
| 150 | 2026 | July 20 | IndyCar | Borchetta Bourbon Music City Grand Prix **(O)** | 10 | (Spain) Álex Palou (24) | Dallara DW12 | Honda HI26TT V6t | Firestone | 4 | 97 |
| 151 | 2026 | August 9 | IndyCar | OnlyBulls Grand Prix of Portland **(R)** | 10 | (Spain) Álex Palou (25) | Dallara DW12 | Honda HI26TT V6t | Firestone | 2 | 60 |

==== Complete Indy Lights / Indy NXT Results ====
(key) (results in bold indicate pole position; results in italics indicate fastest lap)

| Year | Chassis | Engine | Drivers | No. | 1 | 2 | 3 | 4 | 5 | 6 | 7 | 8 | 9 | 10 | 11 | 12 | 13 | 14 | 15 | 16 | 17 | Position | Points |
|---|---|---|---|---|---|---|---|---|---|---|---|---|---|---|---|---|---|---|---|---|---|---|---|
| 2007 | | | | | HMS | STP | | INDY | MIL | IMS | | IOW | WGL | | NSH | MOH | KTY | SNM | | CHI | | | |
| 2007 | Dallara | TWR | (United States) Chris Festa | 9 | **2** | 8 | 12 | 2 | 21 | 11 | 14 | 16 | 21 | 17 | 9 | 13 | 4 | 13 | 19 | 19 | | 10th | **313** |
| 2007 | Dallara | TWR | (Argentina) Pablo Pérez Companc R | 10 | 18 | | | | | | | | | | | | | | | | | 39th | 12 |
| 2025 | | | | | STP | ALA | IMS | | DET | GAT | ROA | MOH | IOW | LAG | | POR | MIL | NSH | | | | | |
| 2025 | Dallara IL-15 | AER 2.0 L Turbo I4 | (Republic of Ireland) Jonathan Browne | 9 | 7 | | | | | | | | | | | | | | | | | 25th | **26** |
| 2025 | Dallara IL-15 | AER 2.0 L Turbo I4 | (United States) Bryce Aron | 9 | | 15 | 15 | 15 | 10 | 14 | 9 | 12 | 9 | 10 | 19 | 19 | 5 | 6 | | | | 11th | **260** |
| 2025 | Dallara IL-15 | AER 2.0 L Turbo I4 | (Netherlands) Niels Koolen | 10 | 21 | 13 | 18 | 6 | 9 | 10 | 15 | 14 | 5 | 11 | 6 | 6 | 12 | 7 | | | | 8th | **288** |
| 2026 | | | | | STP | ARL | BAR | | IMS | | DET | GAT | ROA | | MOH | | NSS | POR | MIL | LAG | | | |
| 2026 | Dallara IL-15 | AER 2.0 L Turbo I4 | (Republic of Ireland) James Roe | 8 | 21 | 17 | 23 | 12 | 10 | 22 | 18 | 18 | 15 | 19 | 20 | 19 | 16 | 14 | 15 | 21 | 16 | 20th | **214** |
| 2026 | Dallara IL-15 | AER 2.0 L Turbo I4 | (United States) Bryce Aron | 9 | 18 | 18 | 8 | 7 | 22 | 12 | 8 | 23 | 21 | 10 | 16 | 14 | 10 | 16 | 8 | 6 | 9 | 14th | **298** |
| 2026 | Dallara IL-15 | AER 2.0 L Turbo I4 | (Netherlands) Niels Koolen | 10 | 22 | 13 | 17 | 20 | 8 | 14 | 23 | 4 | 11 | 9 | 13 | 13 | 21 | 17 | 23 | 5 | 23 | 15th | **268** |
| 2026 | Dallara IL-15 | AER 2.0 L Turbo I4 | (United States) Carson Etter | 11 | 24 | 19 | 21 | 21 | 17 | 19 | 19 | 16 | 16 | 13 | 21 | 23 | 20 | 24 | 16 | 20 | 19 | 22nd | **182** |

== Sports car entries ==
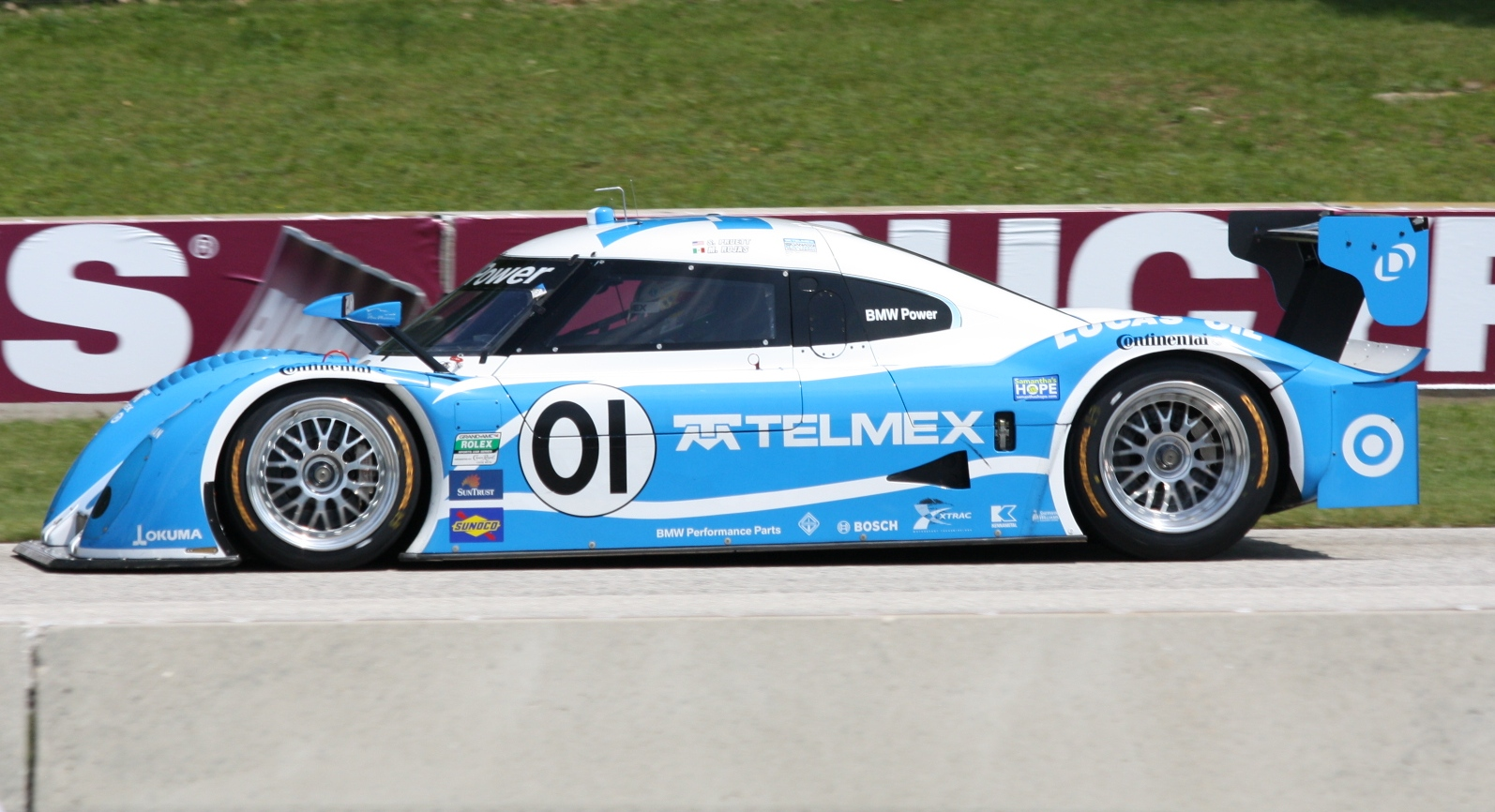
2011 Daytona Prototype at Road America

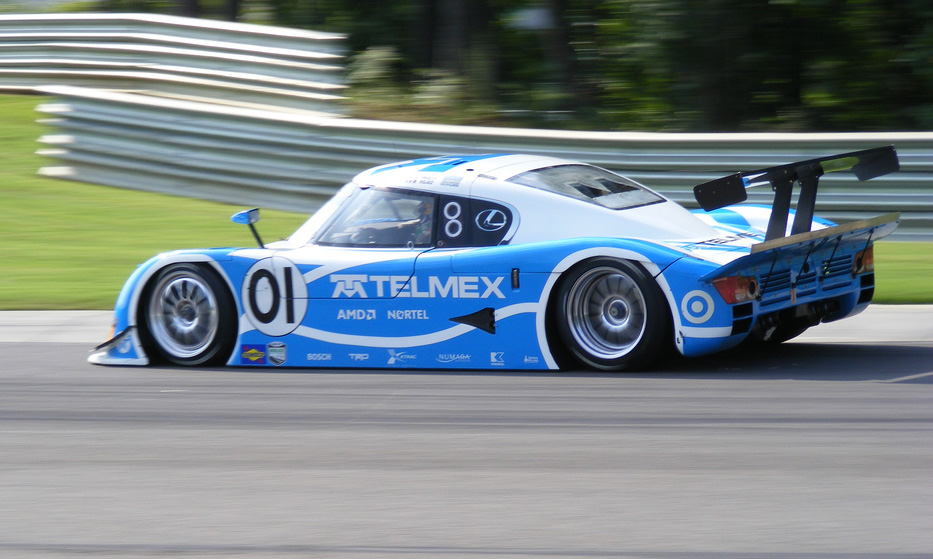
Lexus-Riley prototype driven by Chip Ganassi Racing driver Scott Pruett

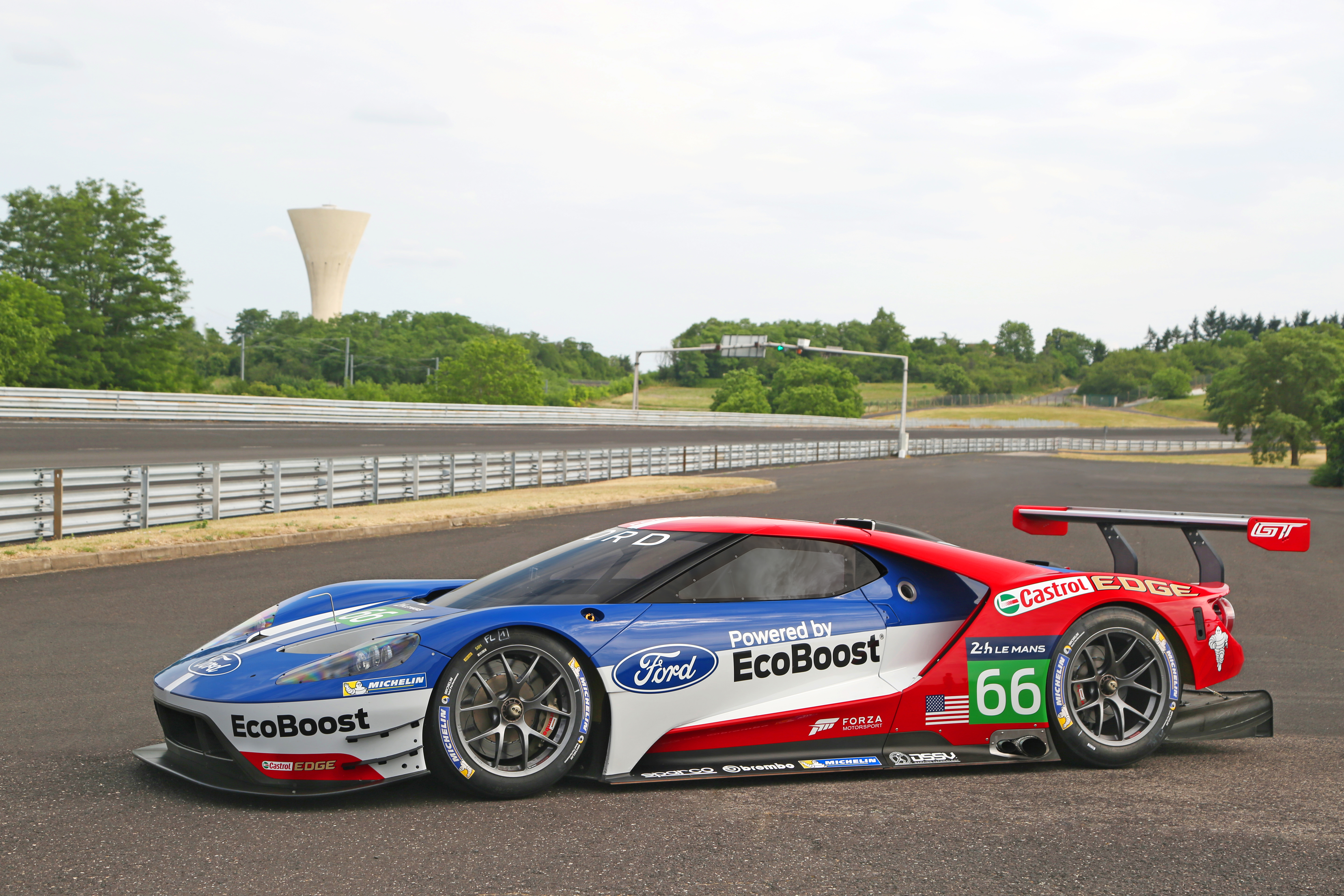
Ford GT GTE-Pro, which competed in the FIA World Endurance Championship from 2016 until the end of the 2018–19 season and the WeatherTech SportsCar Championship from the 2016 season until the end of the 2019 season.

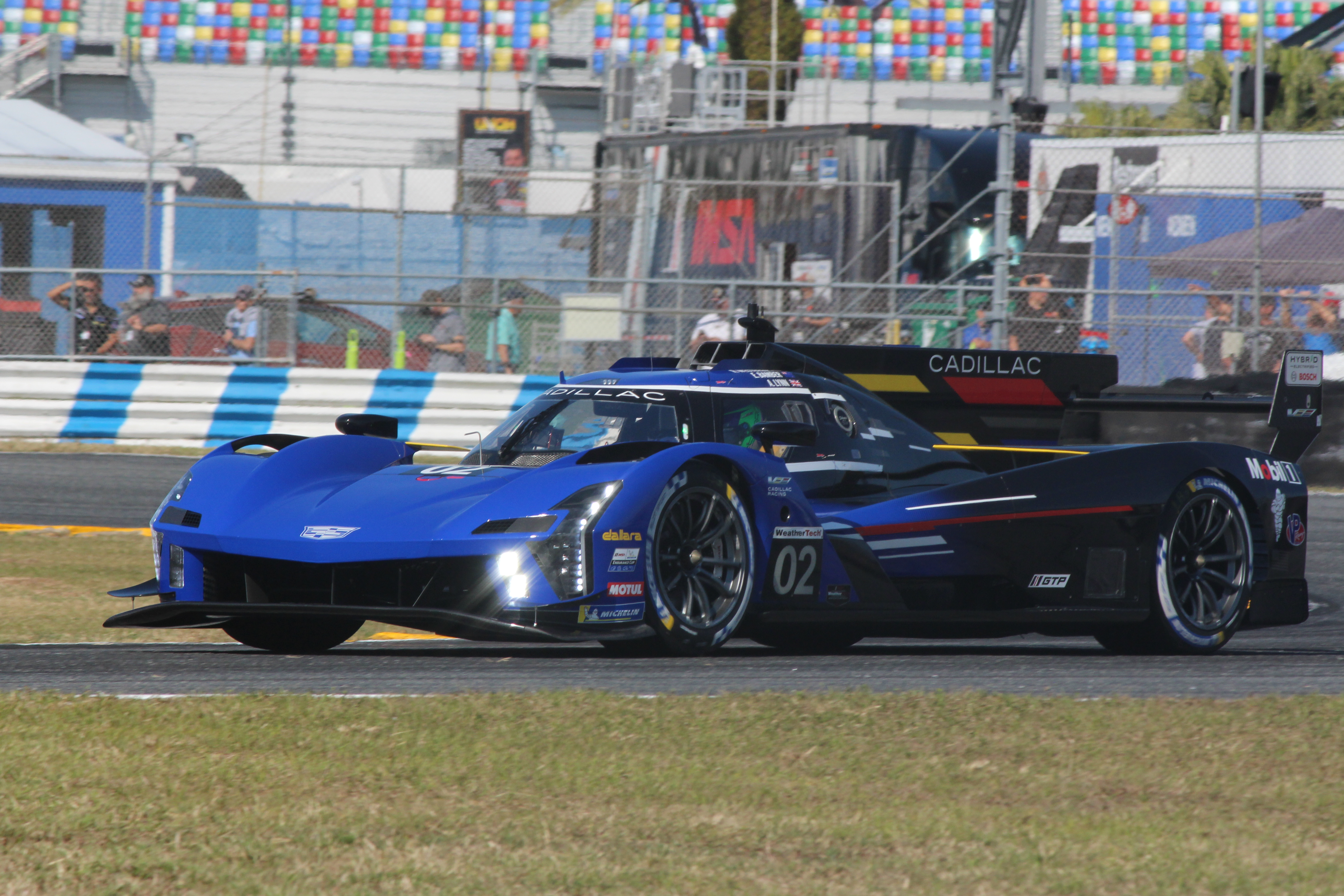
2023 V-Series.R LMDh at Daytona International Speedway.

=== Grand-Am ===
Initially, CGR fielded the 01 Lexus-rebadged Toyota-Riley car driven by Scott Pruett and Max Papis. Their second team car, the 02, was driven by Jimmy Morales and Luis Diaz. CGR won the 2006 24 Hours of Daytona with Ganassi IRL drivers Dan Wheldon and Scott Dixon along with NASCAR driver Casey Mears. In 2007, Ganassi won the race again, this time with Pruett, former Formula 1 driver Juan Pablo Montoya, and Salvador Duran, making him the first owner to win it in back to back years since Al Holbert in 1986–87. In 2008 Chip Ganassi Racing won a third Daytona 24 in a row. Also in 2008, Chip Ganassi Racing won their 3rd Grand-Am Championship, with drivers Scott Pruett, and Memo Rojas. It was Pruett's 8th Road Racing Championship. Also participating was Memo Rojas, the first Mexican to win a major Road Racing title in North America. For the 2010 Grand-Am season the team switched from Lexus-Riley to BMW-Riley. Rojas and Pruett won 9 out of 12 races and eventually won the Grand-Am championship.

==== 2011 Rolex 24 victory ====
Ganassi's Grand-Am Series team started 2011 in the best possible fashion, earning a one-two finish in the Rolex 24 Hours of Daytona endurance race. Ganassi's two cars ran towards the front of the field for the majority of the race, and driver Scott Pruett, having started third, defeated Scott Dixon by a margin of victory of over two seconds in a one-lap sprint to the finish after a late caution period.

The victory made Ganassi the first racing team owner to win the four of the most important races in North American auto racing, the Daytona 500, Indianapolis 500, Brickyard 400, and 24 Hours of Daytona, within the same 12-month span. It was Pruett's fourth win in the event; for co-driver Memo Rojas, his second victory, while co-drivers Joey Hand and Graham Rahal won for the first time, the latter thirty years after his father, Bobby Rahal, won the event.

=== IMSA WeatherTech SportsCar Championship ===
CGR would field a Riley-Ford Daytona Prototype in the inaugural season of the merged United SportsCar Championship for Scott Pruett and Memo Rojas, winning three races. In 2015, Rojas was replaced by ex-BMW works driver Joey Hand, and the team fielded an "all-star car" at Daytona consisting of the teams IndyCar and NASCAR drivers.

For 2016, the team would move to the GTLM class with the brand new Ford GT, and thus the Daytona Prototype programme officially disbanded. Long time Ganassi driver Pruett would no longer have a place on the team, as Hand would partner with Dirk Müller (another ex-BMW works driver), while Ryan Briscoe and Richard Westbrook were hired to drive the second GT. For Daytona, the team would bring out the Riley DPs one last time, the IndyCar/NASCAR "all-star car" being joined by a team of Alexander Wurz, Brendon Hartley, Andy Priaulx, and future Formula One driver Lance Stroll, in the last Rolex 24 of the DP era.

==== IMSA Race Results ====
| Year | Chassis | Engine | Team | No. | Drivers | 1 | 2 | 3 | 4 | 5 | 6 | 7 | 8 | 9 | 10 | 11 | 12 |
|---|---|---|---|---|---|---|---|---|---|---|---|---|---|---|---|---|---|
| 2016 | Riley; Mk XXVI; Daytona Prototype | Ford; 3.5 L EcoBoost; V6 | | | | DAY | SEB | LGB | LGA | DET | WTK | MOS | LMR | ELK | VIR | COTA | PETIT |
| 2016 | Riley; Mk XXVI; Daytona Prototype | Ford; 3.5 L EcoBoost; V6 | Ford; Chip; Ganassi; Racing | 01 | (Canada) Lance Stroll | 5 | | | | | | | | | | | |
| 2016 | Riley; Mk XXVI; Daytona Prototype | Ford; 3.5 L EcoBoost; V6 | Ford; Chip; Ganassi; Racing | 01 | (Austria) Alexander Wurz | 5 | | | | | | | | | | | |
| 2016 | Riley; Mk XXVI; Daytona Prototype | Ford; 3.5 L EcoBoost; V6 | Ford; Chip; Ganassi; Racing | 01 | (New Zealand) Brendon Hartley | 5 | | | | | | | | | | | |
| 2016 | Riley; Mk XXVI; Daytona Prototype | Ford; 3.5 L EcoBoost; V6 | Ford; Chip; Ganassi; Racing | 01 | (United Kingdom) Andy Priaulx | 5 | | | | | | | | | | | |
| 2016 | Riley; Mk XXVI; Daytona Prototype | Ford; 3.5 L EcoBoost; V6 | Ford; Chip; Ganassi; Racing | 02 | (New Zealand) Scott Dixon | 7 | | | | | | | | | | | |
| 2016 | Riley; Mk XXVI; Daytona Prototype | Ford; 3.5 L EcoBoost; V6 | Ford; Chip; Ganassi; Racing | 02 | (Brazil) Tony Kanaan | 7 | | | | | | | | | | | |
| 2016 | Riley; Mk XXVI; Daytona Prototype | Ford; 3.5 L EcoBoost; V6 | Ford; Chip; Ganassi; Racing | 02 | (United States) Jamie McMurray | 7 | | | | | | | | | | | |
| 2016 | Riley; Mk XXVI; Daytona Prototype | Ford; 3.5 L EcoBoost; V6 | Ford; Chip; Ganassi; Racing | 02 | (United States) Kyle Larson | 7 | | | | | | | | | | | |
| 2016 | | Ford; 3.5 L EcoBoost; V6 | Ford; Chip; Ganassi; Racing | | | DAY | SEB | LGB | LGA | DET | WTK | MOS | LMR | ELK | VIR | COTA | PETIT |
| 2016 | Ford GT | Ford; 3.5 L EcoBoost; V6 | Ford; Chip; Ganassi; Racing | 66 | (United States) Joey Hand | 7 | 8 | 9 | 1 | | 2 | 5 | 5 | 9 | 2 | 6 | 2 |
| 2016 | Ford GT | Ford; 3.5 L EcoBoost; V6 | Ford; Chip; Ganassi; Racing | 66 | (Germany) Dirk Müller | 7 | 8 | 9 | 1 | | 2 | 5 | 5 | 9 | 2 | 6 | 2 |
| 2016 | Ford GT | Ford; 3.5 L EcoBoost; V6 | Ford; Chip; Ganassi; Racing | 66 | (France) Sébastien Bourdais | 7 | 8 | | 1 | | | | | | | | 2 |
| 2016 | Ford GT | Ford; 3.5 L EcoBoost; V6 | Ford; Chip; Ganassi; Racing | 67 | (Australia) Ryan Briscoe | 9 | 5 | 2 | 3 | | 1 | 1 | 3 | 2 | 4 | 9 | 7 |
| 2016 | Ford GT | Ford; 3.5 L EcoBoost; V6 | Ford; Chip; Ganassi; Racing | 67 | (United Kingdom) Richard Westbrook | 9 | 5 | 2 | 3 | | 1 | 1 | 3 | 2 | 4 | 9 | 7 |
| 2016 | Ford GT | Ford; 3.5 L EcoBoost; V6 | Ford; Chip; Ganassi; Racing | 67 | (Germany) Stefan Mücke | 9 | | | | | | | | | | | |
| 2016 | Ford GT | Ford; 3.5 L EcoBoost; V6 | Ford; Chip; Ganassi; Racing | 67 | (New Zealand) Scott Dixon | | 5 | | 3 | | | | | | | | 7 |
| 2017 | Ford GT | Ford; 3.5 L EcoBoost; V6 | Ford; Chip; Ganassi; Racing | | | DAY | SEB | LGB | COTA | DET | WTK | MOS | LMR | ELK | VIR | LGA | PETIT |
| 2017 | Ford GT | Ford; 3.5 L EcoBoost; V6 | Ford; Chip; Ganassi; Racing | 66 | (United States) Joey Hand | 1 | 2 | 8 | 5 | | 4 | 5 | 7 | 1 | 5 | 6 | 7 |
| 2017 | Ford GT | Ford; 3.5 L EcoBoost; V6 | Ford; Chip; Ganassi; Racing | 66 | (Germany) Dirk Müller | 1 | 2 | 8 | 5 | | 4 | 5 | 7 | 1 | 5 | 6 | 7 |
| 2017 | Ford GT | Ford; 3.5 L EcoBoost; V6 | Ford; Chip; Ganassi; Racing | 66 | (France) Sébastien Bourdais | 1 | 2 | | | | | | | | | | 7 |
| 2017 | Ford GT | Ford; 3.5 L EcoBoost; V6 | Ford; Chip; Ganassi; Racing | 67 | (Australia) Ryan Briscoe | 10 | 4 | 2 | 6 | | 2 | 3 | 5 | 3 | 2 | 5 | 8 |
| 2017 | Ford GT | Ford; 3.5 L EcoBoost; V6 | Ford; Chip; Ganassi; Racing | 67 | (United Kingdom) Richard Westbrook | 10 | 4 | 2 | 6 | | 2 | 3 | 5 | 3 | 2 | 5 | 8 |
| 2017 | Ford GT | Ford; 3.5 L EcoBoost; V6 | Ford; Chip; Ganassi; Racing | 67 | (New Zealand) Scott Dixon | 10 | 4 | | | | | | | | | | 8 |
| 2017 | Ford GT | Ford; 3.5 L EcoBoost; V6 | Ford; Chip; Ganassi; Team; UK | 68 | (France) Olivier Pla | 7 | 5 | | | | | | | | | | |
| 2017 | Ford GT | Ford; 3.5 L EcoBoost; V6 | Ford; Chip; Ganassi; Team; UK | 68 | (Germany) Stefan Mücke | 7 | 5 | | | | | | | | | | |
| 2017 | Ford GT | Ford; 3.5 L EcoBoost; V6 | Ford; Chip; Ganassi; Team; UK | 68 | (United States) Billy Johnson | 7 | 5 | | | | | | | | | | |
| 2017 | Ford GT | Ford; 3.5 L EcoBoost; V6 | Ford; Chip; Ganassi; Team; UK | 69 | (United Kingdom) Andy Priaulx | 5 | | | | | | | | | | | |
| 2017 | Ford GT | Ford; 3.5 L EcoBoost; V6 | Ford; Chip; Ganassi; Team; UK | 69 | (United Kingdom) Harry Tincknell | 5 | | | | | | | | | | | |
| 2017 | Ford GT | Ford; 3.5 L EcoBoost; V6 | Ford; Chip; Ganassi; Team; UK | 69 | (Brazil) Tony Kanaan | 5 | | | | | | | | | | | |
| 2018 | Ford GT | Ford; 3.5 L EcoBoost; V6 | | | | DAY | SEB | LGB | MOH | DET | WTK | MOS | LMR | ELK | VIR | LGA | PETIT |
| 2018 | Ford GT | Ford; 3.5 L EcoBoost; V6 | Ford; Chip; Ganassi; Racing | 66 | (United States) Joey Hand | 2 | 9 | 3 | 4 | | 1 | 5 | 1 | 7 | 4 | 7 | 7 |
| 2018 | Ford GT | Ford; 3.5 L EcoBoost; V6 | Ford; Chip; Ganassi; Racing | 66 | (Germany) Dirk Müller | 2 | 9 | 3 | 4 | | 1 | 5 | 1 | 7 | 4 | 7 | 7 |
| 2018 | Ford GT | Ford; 3.5 L EcoBoost; V6 | Ford; Chip; Ganassi; Racing | 66 | (France) Sébastien Bourdais | 2 | 9 | | | | | | | | | | 7 |
| 2018 | Ford GT | Ford; 3.5 L EcoBoost; V6 | Ford; Chip; Ganassi; Racing | 67 | (Australia) Ryan Briscoe | 1 | 4 | 2 | 5 | | 6 | 1 | 6 | 1 | 7 | 6 | 5 |
| 2018 | Ford GT | Ford; 3.5 L EcoBoost; V6 | Ford; Chip; Ganassi; Racing | 67 | (United Kingdom) Richard Westbrook | 1 | 4 | 2 | 5 | | 6 | 1 | 6 | 1 | 7 | 6 | 5 |
| 2018 | Ford GT | Ford; 3.5 L EcoBoost; V6 | Ford; Chip; Ganassi; Racing | 67 | (New Zealand) Scott Dixon | 1 | 4 | | | | | | | | | | 5 |
| 2019 | Ford GT | Ford; 3.5 L EcoBoost; V6 | | | | DAY | SEB | LGB | MOH | DET | WTK | MOS | LMR | ELK | VIR | LGA | PETIT |
| 2019 | Ford GT | Ford; 3.5 L EcoBoost; V6 | Ford; Chip; Ganassi; Racing | 66 | (United States) Joey Hand | 7 | 2 | | | | 4 | 6 | 3 | 2 | 6 | 1 | 8 |
| 2019 | Ford GT | Ford; 3.5 L EcoBoost; V6 | Ford; Chip; Ganassi; Racing | 66 | (Germany) Dirk Müller | 7 | 2 | 4 | 7 | | 4 | 6 | 3 | 2 | 6 | 1 | 8 |
| 2019 | Ford GT | Ford; 3.5 L EcoBoost; V6 | Ford; Chip; Ganassi; Racing | 66 | (France) Sébastien Bourdais | 7 | 2 | 4 | 7 | | | | | | | | 8 |
| 2019 | Ford GT | Ford; 3.5 L EcoBoost; V6 | Ford; Chip; Ganassi; Racing | 67 | (Australia) Ryan Briscoe | 4 | 6 | 6 | 5 | | 3 | 5 | 1 | 1 | 5 | 6 | 2 |
| 2019 | Ford GT | Ford; 3.5 L EcoBoost; V6 | Ford; Chip; Ganassi; Racing | 67 | (United Kingdom) Richard Westbrook | 4 | 6 | 6 | 5 | | 3 | 5 | 1 | 1 | 5 | 6 | 2 |
| 2019 | Ford GT | Ford; 3.5 L EcoBoost; V6 | Ford; Chip; Ganassi; Racing | 67 | (New Zealand) Scott Dixon | 4 | 6 | | | | | | | | | | 2 |
| 2021 | Cadillac DPi-V.R | Cadillac 5.5 L V8 | | | | DAY | SEB | MOH | BEL | WGL1 | WGL2 | LIM | ELK | LGA | LBH | VIR | PETIT |
| 2021 | Cadillac DPi-V.R | Cadillac 5.5 L V8 | Cadillac; Chip; Ganassi; Racing | 01 | (Denmark) Kevin Magnussen | 5 | 5 | 5 | 1 | 6 | 2 | | 3 | 2 | 2 | | |
| 2021 | Cadillac DPi-V.R | Cadillac 5.5 L V8 | Cadillac; Chip; Ganassi; Racing | 01 | (Netherlands) Renger van der Zande | 5 | 5 | 5 | 1 | 6 | 2 | | 3 | 2 | 2 | | 5 |
| 2021 | Cadillac DPi-V.R | Cadillac 5.5 L V8 | Cadillac; Chip; Ganassi; Racing | 01 | (New Zealand) Scott Dixon | 5 | 5 | | | | | | | | | | 5 |
| 2021 | Cadillac DPi-V.R | Cadillac 5.5 L V8 | Cadillac; Chip; Ganassi; Racing | 01 | (New Zealand) Earl Bamber | | | | | | | | | | | | 5 |
| 2022 | Cadillac DPi-V.R | Cadillac 5.5 L V8 | | | | DAY | SEB | LBH | LGA | MOH | BEL | WGL | MOS | ELK | PETIT | | |
| 2022 | Cadillac DPi-V.R | Cadillac 5.5 L V8 | Cadillac; Chip; Ganassi; Racing | 01 | (France) Sébastien Bourdais | 7 | 7 | 1 | 6 | 5 | 1 | 3 | 1 | 3 | 4 | | |
| 2022 | Cadillac DPi-V.R | Cadillac 5.5 L V8 | Cadillac; Chip; Ganassi; Racing | 01 | (Netherlands) Renger van der Zande | 7 | 7 | 1 | 6 | 5 | 1 | 3 | 1 | 3 | 4 | | |
| 2022 | Cadillac DPi-V.R | Cadillac 5.5 L V8 | Cadillac; Chip; Ganassi; Racing | 01 | (New Zealand) Scott Dixon | 7 | | | | | | | | | 4 | | |
| 2022 | Cadillac DPi-V.R | Cadillac 5.5 L V8 | Cadillac; Chip; Ganassi; Racing | 01 | (Spain) Álex Palou | 7 | | | | | | | | | | | |
| 2022 | Cadillac DPi-V.R | Cadillac 5.5 L V8 | Cadillac; Chip; Ganassi; Racing | 01 | (United States) Ryan Hunter-Reay | | 7 | | | | | | | | | | |
| 2022 | Cadillac DPi-V.R | Cadillac 5.5 L V8 | Cadillac; Chip; Ganassi; Racing | 02 | (New Zealand) Earl Bamber | 6 | 1 | 2 | 5 | 4 | 3 | 4 | 4 | 2 | 5 | | |
| 2022 | Cadillac DPi-V.R | Cadillac 5.5 L V8 | Cadillac; Chip; Ganassi; Racing | 02 | (United Kingdom) Alex Lynn | 6 | 1 | 2 | 5 | 4 | 3 | 4 | 4 | 2 | 5 | | |
| 2022 | Cadillac DPi-V.R | Cadillac 5.5 L V8 | Cadillac; Chip; Ganassi; Racing | 02 | (Sweden) Marcus Ericsson | 6 | | | | | | | | | | | |
| 2022 | Cadillac DPi-V.R | Cadillac 5.5 L V8 | Cadillac; Chip; Ganassi; Racing | 02 | (Denmark) Kevin Magnussen | 6 | | | | | | | | | | | |
| 2022 | Cadillac DPi-V.R | Cadillac 5.5 L V8 | Cadillac; Chip; Ganassi; Racing | 02 | (Switzerland) Neel Jani | | 1 | | | | | | | | | | |
| 2022 | Cadillac DPi-V.R | Cadillac 5.5 L V8 | Cadillac; Chip; Ganassi; Racing | 02 | (United States) Ryan Hunter-Reay | | | | | | | | | | 5 | | |
| 2023 | Cadillac V-Series.R | Cadillac LMC55R 5.5 L V8 | | | | DAY | SEB | LBH | LGA | WGL | MOS | ELK | IMS | PETIT | | | |
| 2023 | Cadillac V-Series.R | Cadillac LMC55R 5.5 L V8 | Cadillac; Chip; Ganassi; Racing | 01 | (France) Sébastien Bourdais | 3 | 7 | 8 | 1 | 5 | 9 | 4 | 7 | 2 | | | |
| 2023 | Cadillac V-Series.R | Cadillac LMC55R 5.5 L V8 | Cadillac; Chip; Ganassi; Racing | 01 | (Netherlands) Renger van der Zande | 3 | 7 | 8 | 1 | 5 | 9 | 4 | 7 | 2 | | | |
| 2023 | Cadillac V-Series.R | Cadillac LMC55R 5.5 L V8 | Cadillac; Chip; Ganassi; Racing | 01 | (New Zealand) Scott Dixon | 3 | 7 | | | | | | | 2 | | | |
| 2023 | Cadillac V-Series.R | Cadillac LMC55R 5.5 L V8 | Cadillac; Chip; Ganassi; Racing | 02 | (New Zealand) Earl Bamber | 4 | | | | | | | | | | | |
| 2023 | Cadillac V-Series.R | Cadillac LMC55R 5.5 L V8 | Cadillac; Chip; Ganassi; Racing | 02 | (United Kingdom) Alex Lynn | 4 | | | | | | | | | | | |
| 2023 | Cadillac V-Series.R | Cadillac LMC55R 5.5 L V8 | Cadillac; Chip; Ganassi; Racing | 02 | (United Kingdom) Richard Westbrook | 4 | | | | | | | | | | | |
| 2024 | Cadillac V-Series.R | Cadillac LMC55R 5.5 L V8 | | | | DAY | SEB | LBH | LGA | DET | WGL | ELK | IMS | PETIT | | | |
| 2024 | Cadillac V-Series.R | Cadillac LMC55R 5.5 L V8 | Cadillac; Chip; Ganassi; Racing | 01 | (France) Sébastien Bourdais | 10 | 2 | 1 | 5 | 3 | 2 | 9 | 8 | 1 | | | |
| 2024 | Cadillac V-Series.R | Cadillac LMC55R 5.5 L V8 | Cadillac; Chip; Ganassi; Racing | 01 | (Netherlands) Renger van der Zande | 10 | 2 | 1 | 5 | 3 | 2 | 9 | 8 | 1 | | | |
| 2024 | Cadillac V-Series.R | Cadillac LMC55R 5.5 L V8 | Cadillac; Chip; Ganassi; Racing | 01 | (New Zealand) Scott Dixon | 10 | 2 | | | | | | | 1 | | | |
| 2024 | Cadillac V-Series.R | Cadillac LMC55R 5.5 L V8 | Cadillac; Chip; Ganassi; Racing | 01 | (Spain) Álex Palou | 10 | | | | | | | | | | | |

==== WeatherTech SportsCar Championship wins ====
| # | Season | Date | Classes | Track / Race | No. | Winning driver | Chassis | Engine |
|---|---|---|---|---|---|---|---|---|
| 1 | 2014 | March 15 | Prototype | Sebring | 01 | (United Kingdom) Marino Franchitti / (United States) Scott Pruett / (Mexico) Memo Rojas | Ford EcoBoost Riley DP | Ford Ecoboost 3.5 L V6 Turbo |
| 2 | 2014 | April 12 | Prototype | Long Beach | 01 | (United States) Scott Pruett / (Mexico) Memo Rojas | Ford EcoBoost Riley DP | Ford Ecoboost 3.5 L V6 Turbo |
| 3 | 2014 | September 20 | Prototype | Austin | 01 | (United States) Scott Pruett / (Mexico) Memo Rojas | Ford EcoBoost Riley DP | Ford Ecoboost 3.5 L V6 Turbo |
| 4 | 2015 | January 24–25 | Prototype | Daytona | 02 | (New Zealand) Dixon / (Brazil) Kanaan / (United States) Larson / (United States) McMurray | Ford EcoBoost Riley DP | Ford Ecoboost 3.5 L V6 Turbo |
| 5 | 2015 | September 19 | Prototype | Austin | 01 | (United States) Joey Hand / (United States) Scott Pruett | Ford EcoBoost Riley DP | Ford Ecoboost 3.5 L V6 Turbo |
| 6 | 2021 | June 12 | DPI | Belle Isle | 01 | (Denmark) Kevin Magnussen / (Netherlands) Renger van der Zande | Cadillac DPi-V.R | Cadillac 5.5 L V8 |
| 7 | 2022 | March 19 | DPI | Sebring | 02 | (New Zealand) Earl Bamber / (Switzerland) Neel Jani / (United Kingdom) Alex Lynn | Cadillac DPi-V.R | Cadillac 5.5 L V8 |
| 8 | 2022 | April 9 | DPI | Long Beach | 01 | (France) Sébastien Bourdais / (Netherlands) Renger van der Zande | Cadillac DPi-V.R | Cadillac 5.5 L V8 |
| 9 | 2022 | June 4 | DPI | Belle Isle | 01 | (France) Sébastien Bourdais / (Netherlands) Renger van der Zande | Cadillac DPi-V.R | Cadillac 5.5 L V8 |
| 10 | 2022 | July 3 | DPI | Mosport | 01 | (France) Sébastien Bourdais / (Netherlands) Renger van der Zande | Cadillac DPi-V.R | Cadillac 5.5 L V8 |
| 11 | 2023 | May 14 | GTP | Laguna Seca | 01 | (France) Sébastien Bourdais / (Netherlands) Renger van der Zande | Cadillac V-Series.R | Cadillac LMC55R 5.5 L V8 |
| 11 | 2024 | April 20 | GTP | Long Beach | 01 | (France) Sébastien Bourdais / (Netherlands) Renger van der Zande | Cadillac V-Series.R | Cadillac LMC55R 5.5 L V8 |
| 12 | 2024 | October 12 | GTP | Road Atlanta | 01 | (France) Sébastien Bourdais / (New Zealand) Scott Dixon / (Netherlands) Renger van der Zande | Cadillac V-Series.R | Cadillac LMC55R 5.5 L V8 |

=== FIA World Endurance Championship ===
On 12 June 2015, at Le Mans, it was announced that Ford would return to the 2016 24 Hours of Le Mans in 2016 with a factory-supported, four-car effort operating as Ford Chip Ganassi Racing and thus marked Ford's return to international automobile road racing as a full-factory entrant since 2004 Formula One season but under Jaguar Racing F1 Team banner after eleven-year absence. The cars would be campaigned by Chip Ganassi Racing in the IMSA WeatherTech SportsCar Championship, and by Multimatic Motorsports Europe (joint-venture) in the FIA World Endurance Championship under the Ford Chip Ganassi Team UK banner.

With the Chip Ganassi teams racing their GT, Ford had podium wins in the FIA GT manufacturer's category both years that it competed in.

==== Notable Team Chip Ganassi UK/US Accomplishments ====
FIA World Endurance Cup for GT Manufacturers
2016 3rd Place: Ford
2017 2nd Place: Ford

FIA Endurance Trophy for LMGTE Pro Teams
2016 2nd Place: Car #67
2016 4th Place: Car #66
2017 2nd Place: Car #67
2017 7th Place: Car #66

World Endurance Cup for GT Drivers
2016: S. Mücke & O. Pla ranked 4th
2016: A. Priaulx, H. Tincknell ranked 5th
2016: B. Johnson ranked 9th
2016: M. Franchitti 13th
2017: A. Priaulx, H. Tincknell ranked 3rd
2017: S. Mücke & O. Pla ranked 8th
2017: L. Derani ranked 10th
2017: B. Johnson ranked 12th

Pole Positions
2016 6 Hours of Fuji: #66 Car (Mücke, Pla)
2016 6 Hours of Shanghai: #67 Car (Priaulx, Tincknell)
2017 6 Hours of Silverstone: #67 Car (Priaulx, Tincknell, Derani)
2018 6 Hours of Spa-Francorchamps: #67 Car (Priaulx, Tincknell, Kanaan)

Fastest Laps
2016 Le Mans 24 Hours: Scott Dixon in #69 at 3:51.514
2016 6 Hours of Circuit of the Americas: Olivier Pla at in #66 2:05.244
2016 6 Hours of Fuji: Harry Tincknell in #67 at 1:38.575
2017 6 Hours of Silverstone: Andy Priaulx in #67 at 1:57.416
2017 6 Hours of Shanghai: Olivier Pla in #66 at 2:02.154

==== FIA World Endurance Championship Race Results ====
| Year | Chassis | Engine | Team | No. | Drivers | 1 | 2 | 3 | 4 | 5 | 6 | 7 | 8 | 9 |
|---|---|---|---|---|---|---|---|---|---|---|---|---|---|---|
| 2016 | Ford; GT | Ford; 3.5 L EcoBoost; V6 | | | | (United Kingdom); SIL | (Belgium); SPA | (France); LMS | (Germany); NÜR | (Mexico); MEX | (United States); COA | (Japan); FUJ | (China); SHA | (Bahrain); BHR |
| 2016 | Ford; GT | Ford; 3.5 L EcoBoost; V6 | Ford; Chip; Ganassi; UK | 66 | (France) Olivier Pla | 5 | 6 | 4 | 4 | 7 | 7 | 2 | 2 | 6 |
| 2016 | Ford; GT | Ford; 3.5 L EcoBoost; V6 | Ford; Chip; Ganassi; UK | 66 | (Germany) Stefan Mücke | 5 | 6 | 4 | 4 | 7 | 7 | 2 | 2 | 6 |
| 2016 | Ford; GT | Ford; 3.5 L EcoBoost; V6 | Ford; Chip; Ganassi; UK | 66 | (United States) Billy Johnson | 5 | 6 | 4 | | | | | | |
| 2016 | Ford; GT | Ford; 3.5 L EcoBoost; V6 | Ford; Chip; Ganassi; UK | 67 | (United Kingdom) Andy Priaulx | 4 | 2 | 9 | 7 | 5 | 4 | 1 | 1 | 4 |
| 2016 | Ford; GT | Ford; 3.5 L EcoBoost; V6 | Ford; Chip; Ganassi; UK | 67 | (United Kingdom) Harry Tincknell | 4 | 2 | 9 | 7 | 5 | 4 | 1 | 1 | 4 |
| 2016 | Ford; GT | Ford; 3.5 L EcoBoost; V6 | Ford; Chip; Ganassi; UK | 67 | (United Kingdom) Marino Franchitti | 4 | 2 | 9 | 7 | 5 | 4 | | | |
| 2016 | Ford; GT | Ford; 3.5 L EcoBoost; V6 | Ford; Chip; Ganassi; USA | 68 | (United States) Joey Hand | | | 1 | | | | | | |
| 2016 | Ford; GT | Ford; 3.5 L EcoBoost; V6 | Ford; Chip; Ganassi; USA | 68 | (Germany) Dirk Müller | | | 1 | | | | | | |
| 2016 | Ford; GT | Ford; 3.5 L EcoBoost; V6 | Ford; Chip; Ganassi; USA | 68 | (France) Sébastien Bourdais | | | 1 | | | | | | |
| 2016 | Ford; GT | Ford; 3.5 L EcoBoost; V6 | Ford; Chip; Ganassi; USA | 69 | (Australia) Ryan Briscoe | | | 3 | | | | | | |
| 2016 | Ford; GT | Ford; 3.5 L EcoBoost; V6 | Ford; Chip; Ganassi; USA | 69 | (United Kingdom) Richard Westbrook | | | 3 | | | | | | |
| 2016 | Ford; GT | Ford; 3.5 L EcoBoost; V6 | Ford; Chip; Ganassi; USA | 69 | (New Zealand) Scott Dixon | | | 3 | | | | | | |
| 2017 | Ford; GT | Ford; 3.5 L EcoBoost; V6 | | | | (United Kingdom); SIL | (Belgium); SPA | (France); LMS | (Germany); NÜR | (Mexico); MEX | (United States); COA | (Japan); FUJ | (China); SHA | (Bahrain); BHR |
| 2017 | Ford; GT | Ford; 3.5 L EcoBoost; V6 | Ford; Chip; Ganassi; UK | 66 | (France) Olivier Pla | 4 | 3 | 10 | 6 | 7 | 8 | 4 | 4 | 5 |
| 2017 | Ford; GT | Ford; 3.5 L EcoBoost; V6 | Ford; Chip; Ganassi; UK | 66 | (Germany) Stefan Mücke | 4 | 3 | 10 | 6 | 7 | 8 | 4 | 4 | 5 |
| 2017 | Ford; GT | Ford; 3.5 L EcoBoost; V6 | Ford; Chip; Ganassi; UK | 66 | (United States) Billy Johnson | 4 | 3 | 10 | | | | | | |
| 2017 | Ford; GT | Ford; 3.5 L EcoBoost; V6 | Ford; Chip; Ganassi; UK | 67 | (United Kingdom) Andy Priaulx | 1 | 4 | 2 | 5 | 4 | 7 | 8 | 1 | 3 |
| 2017 | Ford; GT | Ford; 3.5 L EcoBoost; V6 | Ford; Chip; Ganassi; UK | 67 | (United Kingdom) Harry Tincknell | 1 | 4 | 2 | 5 | 4 | 7 | 8 | 1 | 3 |
| 2017 | Ford; GT | Ford; 3.5 L EcoBoost; V6 | Ford; Chip; Ganassi; UK | 67 | (Brazil) Pipo Derani | 1 | 4 | 2 | | | | | | |
| 2017 | Ford; GT | Ford; 3.5 L EcoBoost; V6 | Ford; Chip; Ganassi; USA | 68 | (United States) Joey Hand | | | 6 | | | | | | |
| 2017 | Ford; GT | Ford; 3.5 L EcoBoost; V6 | Ford; Chip; Ganassi; USA | 68 | (Germany) Dirk Müller | | | 6 | | | | | | |
| 2017 | Ford; GT | Ford; 3.5 L EcoBoost; V6 | Ford; Chip; Ganassi; USA | 68 | (Brazil) Tony Kanaan | | | 6 | | | | | | |
| 2017 | Ford; GT | Ford; 3.5 L EcoBoost; V6 | Ford; Chip; Ganassi; USA | 69 | (Australia) Ryan Briscoe | | | 7 | | | | | | |
| 2017 | Ford; GT | Ford; 3.5 L EcoBoost; V6 | Ford; Chip; Ganassi; USA | 69 | (United Kingdom) Richard Westbrook | | | 7 | | | | | | |
| 2017 | Ford; GT | Ford; 3.5 L EcoBoost; V6 | Ford; Chip; Ganassi; USA | 69 | (New Zealand) Scott Dixon | | | 7 | | | | | | |
| 2018-19 | Ford; GT | Ford; 3.5 L EcoBoost; V6 | | | | (Belgium); SPA | (France); LMS | (United Kingdom); SIL | (Japan); FUJ | (China); SHA | (United States); SEB | (Belgium); SPA | (France); LMS | |
| 2018-19 | Ford; GT | Ford; 3.5 L EcoBoost; V6 | Ford; Chip; Ganassi; UK | 66 | (France) Olivier Pla | 1 | 6 | 6 | 8 | 7 | 11 | 10 | 6 | |
| 2018-19 | Ford; GT | Ford; 3.5 L EcoBoost; V6 | Ford; Chip; Ganassi; UK | 66 | (Germany) Stefan Mücke | 1 | 6 | 6 | 8 | 7 | 11 | 10 | 6 | |
| 2018-19 | Ford; GT | Ford; 3.5 L EcoBoost; V6 | Ford; Chip; Ganassi; UK | 66 | (United States) Billy Johnson | 1 | 6 | | | | 11 | | 6 | |
| 2018-19 | Ford; GT | Ford; 3.5 L EcoBoost; V6 | Ford; Chip; Ganassi; UK | 67 | (United Kingdom) Andy Priaulx | 8 | 12 | 2 | 3 | 10 | 3 | 5 | 4 | |
| 2018-19 | Ford; GT | Ford; 3.5 L EcoBoost; V6 | Ford; Chip; Ganassi; UK | 67 | (United Kingdom) Harry Tincknell | 8 | 12 | 2 | 3 | 10 | 3 | 5 | 4 | |
| 2018-19 | Ford; GT | Ford; 3.5 L EcoBoost; V6 | Ford; Chip; Ganassi; UK | 67 | (United States) Jonathan Bomarito | | | | | | 3 | | 4 | |
| 2018-19 | Ford; GT | Ford; 3.5 L EcoBoost; V6 | Ford; Chip; Ganassi; UK | 67 | (Brazil) Tony Kanaan | 8 | 12 | | | | | | | |
| 2018-19 | Ford; GT | Ford; 3.5 L EcoBoost; V6 | Ford; Chip; Ganassi; USA | 68 | (United States) Joey Hand | | 3 | | | | | | 17 | |
| 2018-19 | Ford; GT | Ford; 3.5 L EcoBoost; V6 | Ford; Chip; Ganassi; USA | 68 | (Germany) Dirk Müller | | 3 | | | | | | 17 | |
| 2018-19 | Ford; GT | Ford; 3.5 L EcoBoost; V6 | Ford; Chip; Ganassi; USA | 68 | (France) Sébastien Bourdais | | 3 | | | | | | 17 | |
| 2018-19 | Ford; GT | Ford; 3.5 L EcoBoost; V6 | Ford; Chip; Ganassi; USA | 69 | (Australia) Ryan Briscoe | | 14 | | | | | | 5 | |
| 2018-19 | Ford; GT | Ford; 3.5 L EcoBoost; V6 | Ford; Chip; Ganassi; USA | 69 | (United Kingdom) Richard Westbrook | | 14 | | | | | | 5 | |
| 2018-19 | Ford; GT | Ford; 3.5 L EcoBoost; V6 | Ford; Chip; Ganassi; USA | 69 | (New Zealand) Scott Dixon | | 14 | | | | | | 5 | |
| 2023 | Cadillac; V-Series.R | Cadillac; LMC55R; 5.5 L V8 | | | | (United States); SEB | (Portugal); POR | (Belgium); SPA | (France); LMS | (Italy); MZA | (Japan); FUJ | (Bahrain); BHR | | |
| 2023 | Cadillac; V-Series.R | Cadillac; LMC55R; 5.5 L V8 | Cadillac; Racing | 2 | (United Kingdom) Alex Lynn | 4 | 4 | 5 | 3 | 10 | 10 | 11 | | |
| 2023 | Cadillac; V-Series.R | Cadillac; LMC55R; 5.5 L V8 | Cadillac; Racing | 2 | (United Kingdom) Richard Westbrook | 4 | 4 | 5 | 3 | 10 | 10 | 11 | | |
| 2023 | Cadillac; V-Series.R | Cadillac; LMC55R; 5.5 L V8 | Cadillac; Racing | 2 | (New Zealand) Earl Bamber | 4 | 4 | 5 | 3 | 10 | 10 | 11 | | |
| 2024 | Cadillac; V-Series.R | Cadillac; LMC55R; 5.5 L V8 | Cadillac; Racing | | | (Qatar); QAT | (Italy); ITA | (Belgium); SPA | (France); LMS | (Brazil); BRA | (United States); USA | (Japan); FUJ | (Bahrain); BHR | |
| 2024 | Cadillac; V-Series.R | Cadillac; LMC55R; 5.5 L V8 | Cadillac; Racing | 2 | (United Kingdom) Alex Lynn | DSQ | 10 | Ret | 7 | 13 | 4 | Ret | | |
| 2024 | Cadillac; V-Series.R | Cadillac; LMC55R; 5.5 L V8 | Cadillac; Racing | 2 | (New Zealand) Earl Bamber | DSQ | 10 | Ret | 7 | 13 | 4 | Ret | | |
| 2024 | Cadillac; V-Series.R | Cadillac; LMC55R; 5.5 L V8 | Cadillac; Racing | 2 | (Spain) Alex Palou | | | | 7 | | | | | |
| 2024 | Cadillac; V-Series.R | Cadillac; LMC55R; 5.5 L V8 | Cadillac; Racing | 3 | (France) Sebastien Bourdais | | | | 19 | | | | | |
| 2024 | Cadillac; V-Series.R | Cadillac; LMC55R; 5.5 L V8 | Cadillac; Racing | 3 | (New Zealand) Scott Dixon | | | | 19 | | | | | |
| 2024 | Cadillac; V-Series.R | Cadillac; LMC55R; 5.5 L V8 | Cadillac; Racing | 3 | (Netherlands) Renger van der Zande | | | | 19 | | | | | |

=== 24 Hours of Le Mans ===
| Year | Entrant | No. | Car | Drivers | Class | Laps | Pos. | Class Pos. |
|---|---|---|---|---|---|---|---|---|
| 2016 | (United States) Ford Chip Ganassi Team UK | 66 | Ford GT | (United States) Billy Johnson (Germany) Stefan Mücke (France) Olivier Pla | LMGTE Pro | 339 | 21st | 4th |
| 2016 | (United States) Ford Chip Ganassi Team UK | 67 | Ford GT | (United Kingdom) Marino Franchitti (United Kingdom) Andy Priaulx (United Kingdom) Harry Tincknell | LMGTE Pro | 306 | 40th | 9th |
| 2016 | (United States) Ford Chip Ganassi Team USA | 68 | Ford GT | (France) Sébastien Bourdais (United States) Joey Hand (Germany) Dirk Müller | LMGTE Pro | 340 | 18th | 1st |
| 2016 | (United States) Ford Chip Ganassi Team USA | 69 | Ford GT | (Australia) Ryan Briscoe (New Zealand) Scott Dixon (United Kingdom) Richard Westbrook | LMGTE Pro | 340 | 20th | 3rd |
| 2017 | (United States) Ford Chip Ganassi Team UK | 66 | Ford GT | (United States) Billy Johnson (Germany) Stefan Mücke (France) Olivier Pla | LMGTE Pro | 332 | 27th | 10th |
| 2017 | (United States) Ford Chip Ganassi Team UK | 67 | Ford GT | (Brazil) Pipo Derani (United Kingdom) Andy Priaulx (United Kingdom) Harry Tincknell | LMGTE Pro | 340 | 18th | 2nd |
| 2017 | (United States) Ford Chip Ganassi Team USA | 68 | Ford GT | (United States) Joey Hand (Brazil) Tony Kanaan (Germany) Dirk Müller | LMGTE Pro | 339 | 22nd | 6th |
| 2017 | (United States) Ford Chip Ganassi Team USA | 69 | Ford GT | (Australia) Ryan Briscoe (New Zealand) Scott Dixon (United Kingdom) Richard Westbrook | LMGTE Pro | 337 | 23rd | 7th |
| 2018 | (United States) Ford Chip Ganassi Team UK | 66 | Ford GT | (United States) Billy Johnson (Germany) Stefan Mücke (France) Olivier Pla | LMGTE Pro | 340 | 21st | 6th |
| 2018 | (United States) Ford Chip Ganassi Team UK | 67 | Ford GT | (Brazil) Tony Kanaan (United Kingdom) Andy Priaulx (United Kingdom) Harry Tincknell | LMGTE Pro | 332 (Note: The No. 67 Ford was penalised 11 laps and 1:23.499 by the stewards following the race for Tony Kanaan failing to meet the minimum overall drive time of six hours.) | 36th | 12th |
| 2018 | (United States) Ford Chip Ganassi Team USA | 68 | Ford GT | (France) Sébastien Bourdais (United States) Joey Hand (Germany) Dirk Müller | LMGTE Pro | 343 | 17th | 3rd |
| 2018 | (United States) Ford Chip Ganassi Team USA | 69 | Ford GT | (Australia) Ryan Briscoe (New Zealand) Scott Dixon (United Kingdom) Richard Westbrook | LMGTE Pro | 309 (Note: The No. 69 Ford was penalised 2 laps and 1:42.968 by the stewards following the race for Scott Dixon failing to meet the minimum overall drive time of six hours.) | 39th | 14th |
| 2019 | (United States) Ford Chip Ganassi Team UK | 66 | Ford GT | (United States) Billy Johnson (Germany) Stefan Mücke (France) Olivier Pla | LMGTE Pro | 340 | 25th | 6th |
| 2019 | (United States) Ford Chip Ganassi Team UK | 67 | Ford GT | (United States) Jonathan Bomarito (United Kingdom) Andy Priaulx (United Kingdom) Harry Tincknell | LMGTE Pro | 342 | 23rd | 4th |
| 2019 | (United States) Ford Chip Ganassi Team USA | 68 | Ford GT | (France) Sébastien Bourdais (United States) Joey Hand (Germany) Dirk Müller | LMGTE Pro | 342 | DSQ | DSQ |
| 2019 | (United States) Ford Chip Ganassi Team USA | 69 | Ford GT | (Australia) Ryan Briscoe (New Zealand) Scott Dixon (United Kingdom) Richard Westbrook | LMGTE Pro | 341 | 24th | 5th |
| 2023 | (United States) Cadillac Racing | 2 | Cadillac V-Series.R | (New Zealand) Earl Bamber (United Kingdom) Alex Lynn (United Kingdom) Richard Westbrook | Hypercar | 341 | 3rd | 3rd |
| 2023 | (United States) Cadillac Racing | 3 | Cadillac V-Series.R | (France) Sébastien Bourdais (New Zealand) Scott Dixon (Netherlands) Renger van der Zande | Hypercar | 340 | 4th | 4th |
| 2024 | (United States) Cadillac Racing | 2 | Cadillac V-Series.R | (New Zealand) Earl Bamber (United Kingdom) Alex Lynn (Spain) Álex Palou | Hypercar | 311 | 7th | 7th |
| 2024 | (United States) Cadillac Racing | 3 | Cadillac V-Series.R | (France) Sébastien Bourdais (New Zealand) Scott Dixon (Netherlands) Renger van der Zande | Hypercar | 223 | DNF | DNF |

== Global RallyCross Championship ==
Ganassi expressed plans to start a team in the AMA Supercross Championship, but in late 2014, Ganassi attended the Global RallyCross Championship's season-ending race in Las Vegas, and as a result, expressed interest in fielding a GRC team. On March 18, 2015, Ganassi announced the creation of a team that began competing in the GRC in 2015. The team is based in the NASCAR shop in Concord, North Carolina, and is led by former Ford World Rally Team engineer Carl Goodman. The team hired former JR Motorsports NASCAR driver Steve Arpin and 13-time X Games medalist Brian Deegan to run the No. 00 and 38 M-Sport Ford Fiestas, respectively. Arpin contested the full season, while Deegan competed in seven of the season's twelve races.

In 2016 Arpin and Deegan were back full-time. Arpin earned the team's first win at Daytona.

In 2017, Ganassi announced he would shut down the Global RallyCross program to focus on other series. The team's assets were acquired by Loenbro Motorsports.

=== Complete Global RallyCross Championship results ===
==== Supercar ====
| Year | Entrant | Car | No. | Driver | 1 | 2 | 3 | 4 | 5 | 6 | 7 | 8 | 9 | 10 | 11 | 12 | GRC | Points |
|---|---|---|---|---|---|---|---|---|---|---|---|---|---|---|---|---|---|---|
| 2015 | Chip Ganassi Racing | Ford Fiesta ST | 00 | (Canada) Steve Arpin | FTA; 7 | DAY1; 5 | DAY2; 3 | MCAS; 5 | DET1; 7 | DET2; 11 | DC; 4 | LA1; 5 | LA2; 5 | BAR1; 8 | BAR2; 4 | LV; 4 | 6th | 357 |
| 2015 | Chip Ganassi Racing | Ford Fiesta ST | 38 | (United States) Brian Deegan | FTA | DAY1 | DAY2 | MCAS; 10 | DET1; 4 | DET2; 5 | DC | LA1; 6 | LA2; 2 | BAR1; 6 | BAR2; 9 | LV; 5 | 10th | 229 |
| 2015 | Chip Ganassi Racing | Ford Fiesta ST | 360 | (United States) Jeff Ward | FTA | DAY1; 6 | DAY2; 4 | MCAS | DET1 | DET2 | DC; 9 | LA1 | LA2 | BAR1 | BAR2 | LV | NC | - |
| 2016 | Chip Ganassi Racing | Ford Fiesta ST | 00 | (Canada) Steve Arpin | PHO1; 4 | PHO2; 5 | DAL; 2 | DAY1; 1 | DAY2; 6 | MCAS1; 3 | MCAS2^{†} | DC; 6 | AC; 5 | SEA; 5 | LA1; 3 | LA2; 10 | 4th | 461 |
| 2016 | Chip Ganassi Racing | Ford Fiesta ST | 38 | (United States) Brian Deegan | PHO1; 3 | PHO2; 6 | DAL; 7 | DAY1; 2 | DAY2; 5 | MCAS1; 2 | MCAS2^{†} | DC; 4 | AC; 3 | SEA; 7 | LA1; 4 | LA2; 1 | 3rd | 473 |

^{†}Race cancelled.

== Extreme E ==
In May 2020, CGR joined the Extreme E electric racing series for its inaugural season in 2021. A month later, the team signed Sara Price to race one of two entries, making her the first confirmed Extreme E racer and the first female driver in team history. Lucas Oil Off Road Racing Series champion Kyle LeDuc joined CGR in July. In December, Sycamore Entertainment signed a multiyear sponsorship deal with CGR, where the team entered the 2021 season as Segi TV Chip Ganassi Racing. In January 2021, GMC announced a multiyear sponsorship deal with CGR which sees the team rebranded as GMC Hummer EV Chip Ganassi Racing and the team's Spark ODYSSEY 21 body styled as the Hummer EV for the 2022 season onwards. CGR's Extreme E team picked up their first series victory on July 7, 2022, with Price becoming the first woman in the organization's history to drive a race-winning car.

CGR left Extreme E after the 2023 season.

=== Racing overview ===
| Year | Name | Car | Tyres | No. | Drivers | Rounds | Pts. | Pos. |
|---|---|---|---|---|---|---|---|---|
| 2021 | (United States) Segi TV Chip Ganassi Racing | Spark Odyssey 21 | **C** | 99. | (United States) Kyle LeDuc (United States) Sara Price | (1–5) (1–5) | 74 | 8th |
| 2022 | (United States) Chip Ganassi Racing / GMC Hummer EV Chip Ganassi Racing | Spark Odyssey 21 | **C** | 99. | (United States) RJ Anderson (United States) Kyle LeDuc (United States) Sara Price | (5) (1–4) (1–5) | 63 | 4th |
| 2023 | (United States) GMC Hummer EV Chip Ganassi Racing | Spark Odyssey 21 | **C** | 99. | (United States) RJ Anderson (United States) Amanda Sorensen | (1–6) (1–6) | 95 | 5th |

* Season still in progress

=== Racing summary ===
| Year | Series | Races | Wins | Pod. | B/Qual. | S/S | Pts. | Pos. |
|---|---|---|---|---|---|---|---|---|
| 2021 | Extreme E | 5 | 0 | 0 | 0 | 1 | 74 | 8th |
| 2022 | Extreme E | 5 | 1 | 1 | 0 | 0 | 63 | 4th |
| 2023 | Extreme E | 10 | 0 | 2 | 1 | 2 | 95 | 5th |

* Season still in progress

=== Complete Extreme E results ===
(Races in bold indicate best qualifiers; races in italics indicate fastest super sector; H indicate Heat race win)

| Year | Entrant | 1 | 2 | 3 | 4 | 5 | 6 | 7 | 8 | 9 | 10 | Pts. | Pos. |
|---|---|---|---|---|---|---|---|---|---|---|---|---|---|
| 2021 | Segi TV Chip Ganassi Racing | DES (Saudi Arabia); 8 | OCE (Senegal); 7 | ARC (Greenland); 9 | ISL (Italy); 4 | JUR (United Kingdom); 8 | | | | | | 74 | 8th |
| 2022 | Chip Ganassi Racing / GMC Hummer EV Chip Ganassi Racing | DES (Saudi Arabia); 4 | ISL1 (Italy); 1 | ISL2 (Italy); 7 | COP (Chile); 4 | ENE (Uruguay); 6 | | | | | | 63 | 4th |
| 2023 | GMC Hummer EV Chip Ganassi Racing | DES1 (Saudi Arabia); 5^{H} | DES2 (Saudi Arabia); 5 | HYD1 (United Kingdom); 4 | HYD2 (United Kingdom); **3**^{HH} | ISL1 (Italy); 3^{H} | ISL2 (Italy); 4 | ISL3 (Italy); 8 | ISL4 (Italy); 4^{H} | COP1 (Chile); 7 | COP2 (Chile); 6 | 95 | 5th |

* Season still in progress
