= Stephen Olvey =

American racing medical director (born 1943)

- Born: Stephen Earl Olvey; March 24, 1943 (age 83); Indianapolis, Indiana, U.S.
- Education: Indiana University School of Medicine
- Occupation: Neurosurgeon
- Years active: 1969–
- Known for: USAC Championship Car Series Medical Director (1975–1978); CART Medical Director (1979–2003)
- Awards: Inducted into the Motorsports Hall of Fame of America (2023)

Stephen Earl Olvey (born March 24, 1943) is an American neurosurgeon, professor, and former medical director of the United States Auto Club (USAC) Championship Car Series from 1975 to 1978 and Championship Auto Racing Teams (CART) from 1979 to 2003.

== Early life ==
Stephen Olvey was born on March 24, 1943, in Indianapolis, Indiana. Olvey developed an interest in Indy car racing at a young age when he would listen to radio broadcasts of the Indianapolis 500 and Bill Vukovich became his favorite racing driver. Olvey attended his first Indianapolis 500 in 1955 where Vukovich would be fatally injured in a crash on lap 57.

Olvey graduated from Hanover College in 1965 and the Indiana University School of Medicine in 1969.

== USAC and CART ==
After graduating from the Indiana University School of Medicine in 1969, Olvey volunteered to help the Indianapolis Motor Speedway medical staff at that years' Indianapolis 500. Olvey noticed the lack of adequate equipment to treat potential injured drivers and would quickly build a relationship with track medical director Dr. Tom Hanna to introduce proper medical equipment to the medical building. Olvey worked with Hanna to begin assigning doctors to response vehicles for the first time at the Indianapolis Motor Speedway.

In 1975, Olvey was hired by USAC as medical director to implement standards–such as permanent medical buildings and standardized rescue vehicles–that would be used at every USAC Champ Car race for the first time, not solely the Indianapolis 500.

In 1977, Olvey was contacted as a second opinion involving Pancho Carter's serious injury during a sprint car test at Phoenix International Raceway. A local hospital was considering amputating Carter's damaged leg, however, Olvey intervened and recommended that Carter be transferred against medical advice to Indianapolis. Carter's leg was not amputated and he would continue to race for several years, later winning a CART race at Michigan in 1981.

In 1979, when CART was formed and split away from USAC, Olvey was hired to be CART's medical director, a position he would hold until 2004. Under his direction, Olvey advocated for and implemented several rule changes to improve the safety of drivers. Following Johnny Rutherford's crash at Phoenix in 1980, Olvey pushed for a rule change to prevent pit crew members from running on to the race track to assist drivers involved in accidents. Olvey pushed CART to standardize medical helicopters at every event after A.J. Foyt was seriously injured at the 1981 Michigan 500 and was transported in Roger Penske's private helicopter.

"On the way [to the care center] I performed a cursory examination and realized that nearly every bone in [Smiley's] body was shattered. He had a gaping wound in his side that looked as if he had been attacked by a large shark. I had never seen such trauma."

— Stephen Olvey, Rapid Response: My Inside Story as a Motor Racing Life-Saver

Olvey was at the scene of Gordon Smiley's fatal accident during qualifying at the 1982 Indianapolis 500. Olvey was deeply disturbed after the accident and seriously contemplated retiring from working in motorsport.

In 1984, after Rick Mears' accident at Sanair Super Speedway, doctors at a local Montreal hospital recommended the amputation of his right foot because of the severe damage. Like Carter seven years prior, Olvey transferred Mears back to Indianapolis where future partner Dr. Terry Trammell worked to save Mears' foot.

Olvey played a major role in the recovery of Roberto Guerrero after a crash testing at the Indianapolis Motor Speedway in 1987. Guerrero suffered a diffuse axonal injury; Olvey placed Guerrero under a coma for 17 days to reduce the swelling of his brain, with the medication used dropping Guerrero's blood pressure dangerously low. Guerrero would recover from his injury and would continue his racing career.

In 1999, Olvey introduced the concept of installing micro-accelerometers in drivers' earplugs to measure the g-forces of a driver at any given time. Development lasted for three years and was implemented for every driver in CART and the Indy Racing League for their respective 2003 seasons.

Following the deaths of Jovy Marcelo in 1992, Gonzalo Rodríguez and Greg Moore in 1999 due to head injuries, Olvey worked with Christian Fittipaldi during off-season testing to introduce the HANS device to CART for the 2000 season. CART would be the first racing series in the world to mandate the use of the HANS device in 2001.

=== 2001 Texas race cancellation ===
A situation developed on Friday of this weekend that in the 25 years I've been involved with motorsports, I have never heard of and have never seen at any other racing venue.

— Stephen Olvey, at CART's official postponement announcement

A race at Texas Motor Speedway was scheduled to take place during the 2001 season for the first time in CART history. After concerns that the cars were too fast for a high-banked oval like Texas, numerous tests had lap speeds between 215 mph (346 km/h) and 226 mph (364 km/h). On race weekend, top practice lap speeds were in excess of 236 mph (380 km/h) with Kenny Brack qualifying first with a lap speed of 233.447 mph (375.697 km/h).

Concerns of the speeds started after Friday practice. Olvey initially thought that two drivers who had pulled in to the pits during Friday practice were experiencing inner-ear problems after flying. On Saturday afternoon, when Patrick Carpentier visited Olvey for a check up, Carpentier noted that he could not walk or stand for four minutes after exiting his car. Data pulled found that drivers were experiencing lateral g-forces in excess of 4 g and vertical g-forces in excess of 3 g, above the amount that humans can tolerate without a G-suit according to former NASA flight director Dr. Richard Jennings, who Olvey had contacted. Olvey polled all 25 drivers in the field and found 21 drivers experienced vision and balance problems after running more than 10 laps.

Despite efforts to slow the cars down, CART made the decision to postpone and eventually cancel the race over concerns that drivers may experience G-LOC. In a press conference, Olvey said "[CART] couldn't send drivers in a situation that is totally unknown." The 2001 Firestone Firehawk 600 would be the only race in CART history to be cancelled for safety concerns.

=== Zanardi crash ===
"...I couldn't be any more proud of CART and the system we have and the safety team. It's unbelievable to see this today. We were really worried...but it shows how strong a person Alex is. He's just a wonderful, wonderful person and really a [sic] strong guy."

— Stephen Olvey, interview during Alex Zanardi's ceremonial laps before the 2003 German 500.

On lap 142 of the 2001 American Memorial, Alex Zanardi lost control of his car exiting the pit lane onto the race track. Zanardi was hit broadside by Alex Tagliani and split Zanardi's car in two. Both of Zanardi's legs were traumatically amputated as a result of the impact.

Olvey, watching from the infield care center, immediately thought he witnessed a double-fatality. When Zanardi was brought to the medical helicopter, he had lost three-fourths of his blood volume and went into cardiac arrest. Olvey made the decision to send the medical helicopter carrying Zanardi to Klinikum Berlin-Marzahn, 60 miles away from the track, rather than near-by Dresden. Because the Klinikum Berlin-Marzahn is a level I trauma center, Olvey thought it would be better equipped to handle trauma at this severity.

Zanardi survived the flight to Berlin and the three hour procedure that followed. Zanardi was not deterred by his accident and began rehabilitating and training to drive again. On May 11, 2003, before the German 500, Zanardi ran 13 ceremonial laps before the start of the race. Using hand controls to accelerate and brake, Zanardi's fastest lap would have qualified fifth for the race. Olvey gave an emotional interview during Zanardi's run, crediting the safety team and Zanardi's perseverance.

== Outside racing and post-CART career ==
In 1977, Olvey was one of three doctors at the Indianapolis Methodist Hospital to recommend a state bill allowing patients to refuse life-prolonging procedures in the event of a terminal condition.

In 1991, Olvey moved to Miami, Florida to become associate professor of clinical neurosurgery and neurology at University of Miami's Miller School of Medicine as well as director of the neuroscience intensive care unit at Jackson Memorial Hospital. Olvey was involved in procedures following John Nemechek's fatal crash at Homestead-Miami Speedway in 1997.

Olvey would hold medical positions in other motorsports after CART. In 2005, Olvey was named medical director of the short-lived Grand Prix Masters. In 2011, Olvey was named Director of Medical Services for the Circuit of the Americas to advise medical services and buildings under construction.

Olvey was a consultant for Dario Franchitti after suffering a concussion on the final lap of the second race of the 2013 Shell-Pennzoil Grand Prix of Houston, ultimately advising that Franchitti retire from racing.

== Personal life and legacy ==
Olvey has been diagnosed with Alzheimer's disease after first experiencing symptoms in 2020. In 2023, Olvey and his wife Lynne moved from Miami to Indianapolis to be closer to family.

Olvey is credited with saving the lives of Roberto Guerrero and Alex Zanardi. Olvey and Trammell were co-inductees into the Motorsports Hall of Fame of America in 2023.

== List of works ==
=== Bibliography ===
- Olvey, Stephen (2006). Rapid Response - My Inside Story as a Motor Racing Life-Saver. Haynes. ISBN 9781844253395.
- Olvey, Stephen (2008). The Man Who Would Not Die - The Remarkable Life of Herschel McKee. Haynes. ISBN 9781844255108.

=== Academic journals ===
- Trammell, T R; Olvey, S E; Reed, D B (May 1986). "Championship Car Racing Accidents and Injuries". The Physician and Sportsmedicine. doi:10.1080/00913847.1986.11709074. PMID 27442937.
- Olvey, S E (May 1987). "Auto racing. Is there a lesson to be learned?". Indiana Medicine: The Journal of the Indiana State Medical Association. PMID 3584951.
- Jacobs, Patrick L.; Olvey, Stephen E; Johnson, Brad M; Cohn, Kelly (December 2002). "Physiological responses to high-speed, open-wheel racecar driving". Medicine and Science in Sports and Exercise. doi:10.1097/00005768-200212000-00033. PMID 12471320.
- Olvey, Stephen E; Knox, Ted; Cohn, Kelly A (March 2004). "The development of a method to measure head acceleration and motion in high-impact crashes". Neurosurgery. doi:10.1227/01.neu.0000108782.68099.29. PMID 15028143.
- Sabra, John P; Cabanas, Jose G; Bedolla, John; Borgmann, Shirley; Hawley, James; Craven, Kevin; Brown, Carlos; Ziebell, Chris; Olvey, Steve (August 2014). "Medical support at a large-scale motorsports mass-gathering event: the inaugural Formula One United States Grand Prix in Austin, Texas". Prehospital and Disaster Medicine. doi:10.1017/S1049023X14000636. PMID 25068212.
- Bedolla, John; Santelli, Jaron; Sabra, John; Cabanas, Jose G; Ziebell, Chris; Olvey, Stephen (September 2016). "Elite Motorcycle Racing: Crash Types and Injury Patterns in the MotoGP Class". The American Journal of Emergency Medicine. doi:10.1016/j.ajem.2016.07.005. PMID 27431735.
