= German 500 =

- Venue: EuroSpeedway Lausitz
- First race: 2001
- Last race: 2003
- Distance: 311.542 miles
- Laps: 154
- Previous names: American Memorial (2001); German 500 (2003)
- Most wins (driver): Kenny Bräck (1); Sébastien Bourdais (1)
- Most wins (team): Team Rahal (1); Newman/Haas Racing (1)
- Most wins (manufacturer): Chassis: Lola (2); Engine: Cosworth (2)

The German 500 was an automobile race sanctioned by CART held at EuroSpeedway Lausitz Tri-Oval in Eastern Germany as German 500 The American Memorial on 15 September 2001, and again two years later as 2003 German 500.

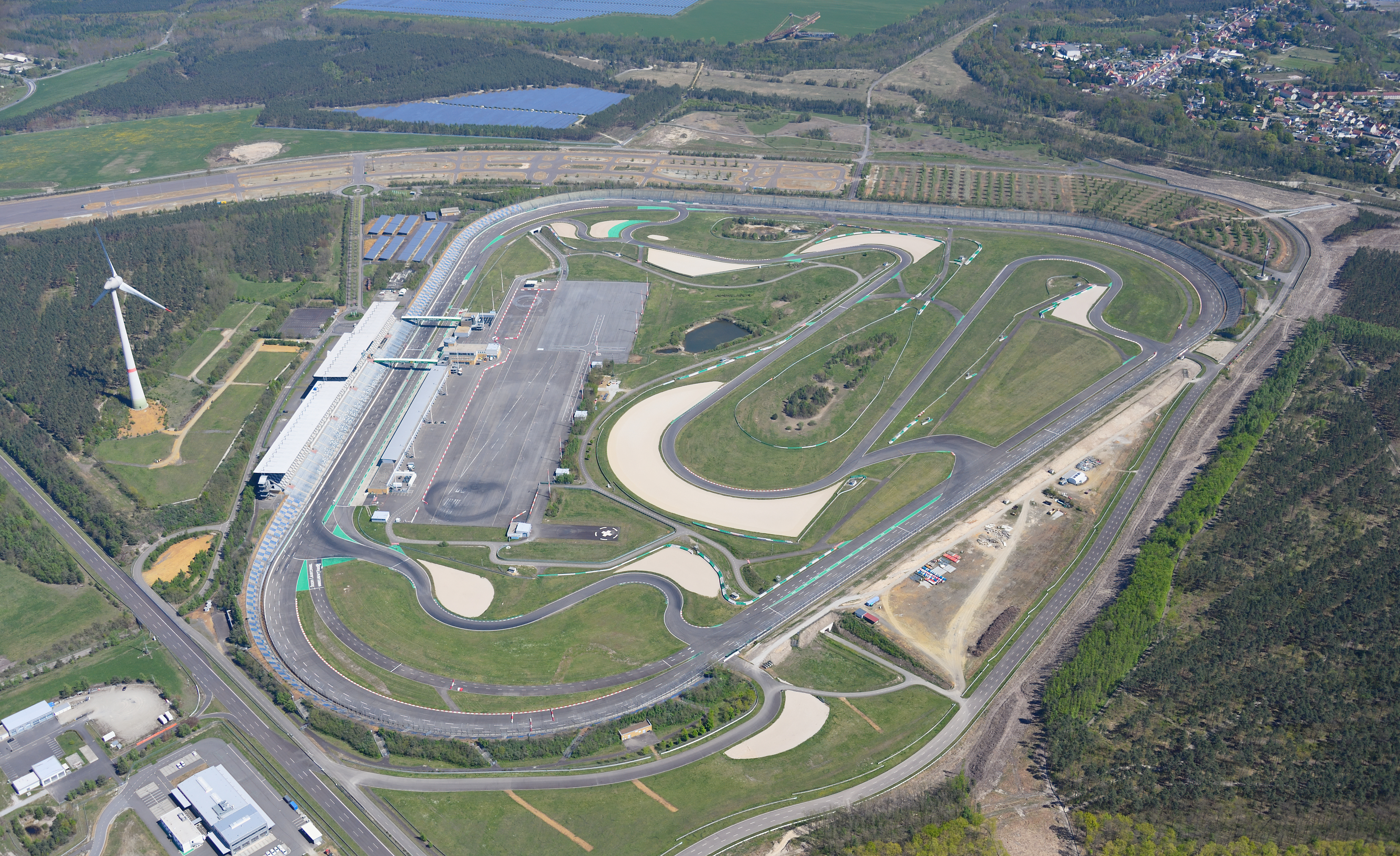
Aerial image of Lausitzring EuroSpeedway tri-oval in 2025

== History ==
US Oval track racing, with Indy 500 single seaters or NASCAR stock cars, was occasionally shown in Europe, with the 1950s Race of Two Worlds in Monza even run as competitions. The 1978 USAC Championship Car season in October raced at Silverstone Circuit and Brands Hatch. The Championship Auto Racing Teams (CART) since 1979 often sourced drivers, chassis makers and engines from Europe, ran the Rio 200 in Brazil since 1996 and the Indy Japan 300 since 1998, while the competing IndyCar Series (IRL) focused on the US and the Indy 500. As two oval race tracks had been built in Europe, the 2001 CART season added a German 500 on the schedule as the first CART race ever to be held in Europe as the beginning of a ten day two race European stretch for the series in late September 2001, with the Rockingham 500 was held at Rockingham Motor Speedway in Corby, England one week later.

Following the September 2 2001 Molson Indy Vancouver, most of the team equipment was shipped to Germany and already there when the September 11 attacks occurred on Tuesday. Practise should begin on Thursday 13 with race on Saturday, September 15. With North American airspace closed drivers and other personnel barely arrived in time.

Most major American sporting events scheduled on the same weekend as the German 500 to be postponed, including National Football League and Major League Baseball games and a NASCAR Winston Cup Series race, the New Hampshire 300 at New Hampshire Motor Speedway. The Italian Grand Prix, a Formula One race, was held that weekend.

According to Ronald Richards, the vice president of CART, the series decided to continue with the race prior to the cancellation of that week's NFL games, a decision followed by other American leagues. Richards acknowledged that "We wish we would have had the input regarding the NFL's decision prior to making our decision." In remembrance of the September 11 attacks' victims, and in a desire to avoid criticism for holding the German 500 so soon afterward, CART changed the race's name to the 2001 American Memorial. The series also held tributes on the day of the race, and made a $500,000 donation to the World Trade Center Relief Fund, matching the event's prize fund.

Practise on the new 2-mile tri-oval had been limited by absence and weather, and the grid was determined by standings, not by performance. Thus, faster cars, like Alex Zanardi, had to catch up from behind. Leading the race 13 laps before the end, he left pits and spun out from the infield onto Turn 1. Some cars could evade, but Alex Tagliani split Zanardi's car in half, severing his lower legs. Under yellow flags, and with German TV having ended the coverage, the marred race was won by Kenny Bräck in a Lola B01/00.

In 2002, the 2002 Sure for Men Rockingham 500 was run but the German 500, originally scheduled for September 21st, was cancelled as EuroSpeedway had filed for insolvency in June.

In 2003, both European races returned, moved to May and to a new track. The 2003 London Champ Car Trophy was held on the Brands Hatch short 1.2-mile Indy track road course, merely a parade. Unlike the British oval, the EuroSpeedway Lausitz and the 2003 German 500 returned, and so did Alex Zanardi, who drove a specially adapted 2001 car prior to the race, doing 13 laps to represent those that he did not complete in 2001. Sébastien Bourdais won the race but CART dropped EuroSpeedway Lausitz and Europe after the 2003 CART season as the 2004 Champ Car World Series re-focussed on North America, plus one event in Australia.

== Race winners ==
Year	Date	Driver	Team	Chassis	Engine	Race Distance		Race Time	Average Speed (mph)	Report	Ref
Year	Date	Driver	Team	Chassis	Engine	Laps	Miles (km)	Race Time	Average Speed (mph)	Report	Ref
2001	15 September	(Sweden) Kenny Bräck	Team Rahal	Lola B01/00	Ford-Cosworth	154	311.542 (501.378)	2:00:20	155.319	Report	
2002	Cancelled after EuroSpeedway Lausitz filed for insolvency										
2003	11 May	(France) Sébastien Bourdais	Newman/Haas Racing	Lola	Ford-Cosworth	154	312.069 (502.226)	1:58:44	170.903	Report	
