= 2001 American Memorial =

Motor race held in 2001

Coordinates: 51°32′0″N 13°55′10″E

(Germany) 2001 American Memorial
Race details
- Race 16 of 21 in the 2001 CART season
- Map of the track
- Date: September 15, 2001
- Official name: The American Memorial
- Location: EuroSpeedway Lausitz; Klettwitz, Brandenburg, Germany
- Course: Oval; 2.023 mi / 3.256 km
- Distance: 154 laps 311.54 mi / 501.42 km

Pole position
- Driver: Gil de Ferran (Brazil) (Team Penske)
- Time: No time trials

Fastest lap
- Driver: Tony Kanaan (Brazil) (Mo Nunn Racing)
- Time: 34.747 (on lap 96 of 154)

Podium
- First: Kenny Bräck (Sweden) (Team Rahal)
- Second: Max Papis (Italy) (Team Rahal)
- Third: Patrick Carpentier (Canada) (Forsythe Racing)

The 2001 American Memorial (German: Amerikanisches Denkmal 2001) was a Championship Auto Racing Teams (CART) motor race held on September 15, 2001, at the EuroSpeedway Lausitz in Klettwitz, Brandenburg, Germany. It was the 16th round of the 2001 CART season and the first race in the series to be held in Europe. Originally known as the German 500, the event's name was changed by CART in the aftermath of the September 11 attacks.

Kenny Bräck, driving the #8 Ford-Cosworth for Team Rahal, won with his teammate Max Papis finished in second place in the #7 Ford-Cosworth. Patrick Carpentier, driving the #32 Ford-Cosworth for Forsythe Racing, finished third to give Ford all three podium positions.

The race was run under caution for the final twelve laps due to a massive accident involving Alex Zanardi, driving the #66 Honda for Mo Nunn Racing, and Alex Tagliani, Carpentier's teammate and driver of the #33 Forsythe Racing car. The crash resulted in a traumatic amputation of both of Zanardi’s legs and nearly resulted in his death.

== Report ==
=== Background ===
The German 500 was the first CART race ever to be held in Europe. It was the beginning of a two-week European stretch for the series; the Rockingham 500 was held at Rockingham Motor Speedway in Corby, England one week later. EuroSpeedway chairman Hans-Jörg Fischer hoped for a crowd of 70,000 at the track, which had a capacity of 90,000.

Entering the German 500, the 16th round of the 2001 CART season, Gil de Ferran held the lead in the season's points standings with 115 points. Bräck and Hélio Castroneves were joint second on 110 points, and Michael Andretti was fourth, seven points further back.

Four days before the race, the September 11 attacks took place, causing most major American sporting events scheduled on the same weekend as the German 500 to be postponed, including National Football League (NFL) and Major League Baseball (MLB) games and the New Hampshire 300 NASCAR Winston Cup Series race at New Hampshire Motor Speedway. The Italian Grand Prix, a Formula One race, was held that weekend. According to CART vice president Ronald Richards, the series decided to continue with the race prior to the cancellation of that week's NFL games, a decision followed by other American leagues. Richards acknowledged that "We wish we would have had the input regarding the NFL's decision prior to making our decision."

In remembrance of the September 11 attacks' victims, and desirous of avoiding criticism for holding the German 500 so soon afterward, CART changed the race's name to the American Memorial. The series also held tributes on the day of the race, and made a $500,000 donation to the World Trade Center Relief Fund, matching the event's prize fund.

=== Practice and qualifying ===
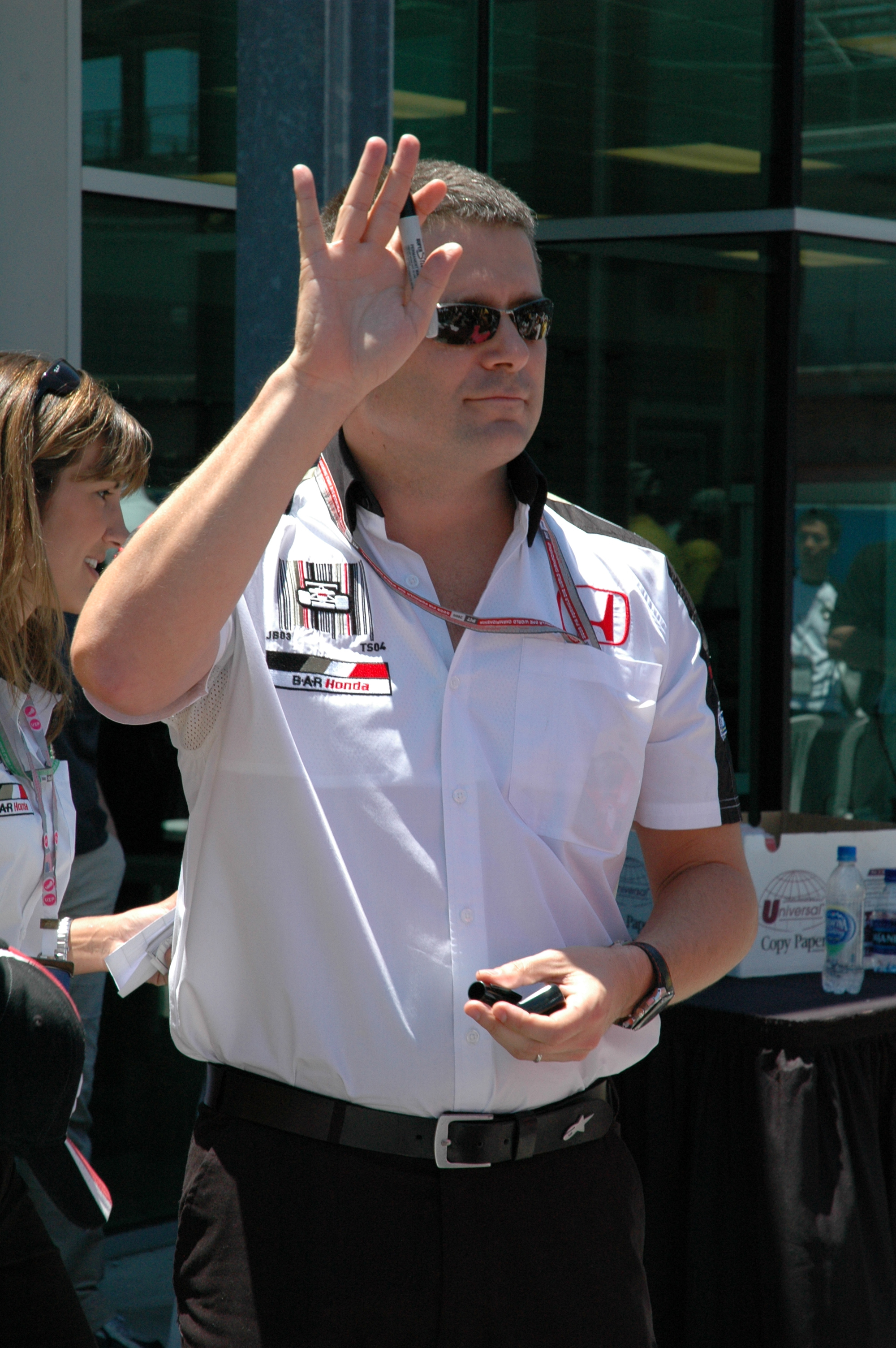
Gil de Ferran (pictured in 2005) was awarded pole position as the leader of the Drivers' Championship standings.

The first day of practice for the American Memorial was scheduled on September 13, but was cancelled because of rain. Practice was held the following day, and Tony Kanaan of Mo Nunn Racing recorded the fastest lap of 34.624 seconds. Teammate Zanardi had a lap of 34.991 seconds for the second-fastest time; he was followed by Carpentier, Bräck, and Bruno Junqueira.

As of September 13, Andretti was unable to travel to Germany from his Nazareth, Pennsylvania residence, since his planned September 11 flight had been grounded. Andretti was able to arrange a charter flight to Germany and landed in Dresden the next day.

Due to the rainout and the drivers' lack of familiarity with the EuroSpeedway, CART cancelled qualifying for the American Memorial. The starting grid was determined by drivers' order in the season points standings. The pole position went to de Ferran, though due to the lack of qualifying, he was not awarded a point in the standings as was customary for pole winners. Bräck earned second position since he held a tie-breaker over Castroneves, who started third, and Andretti began the race in fourth.

=== Race ===
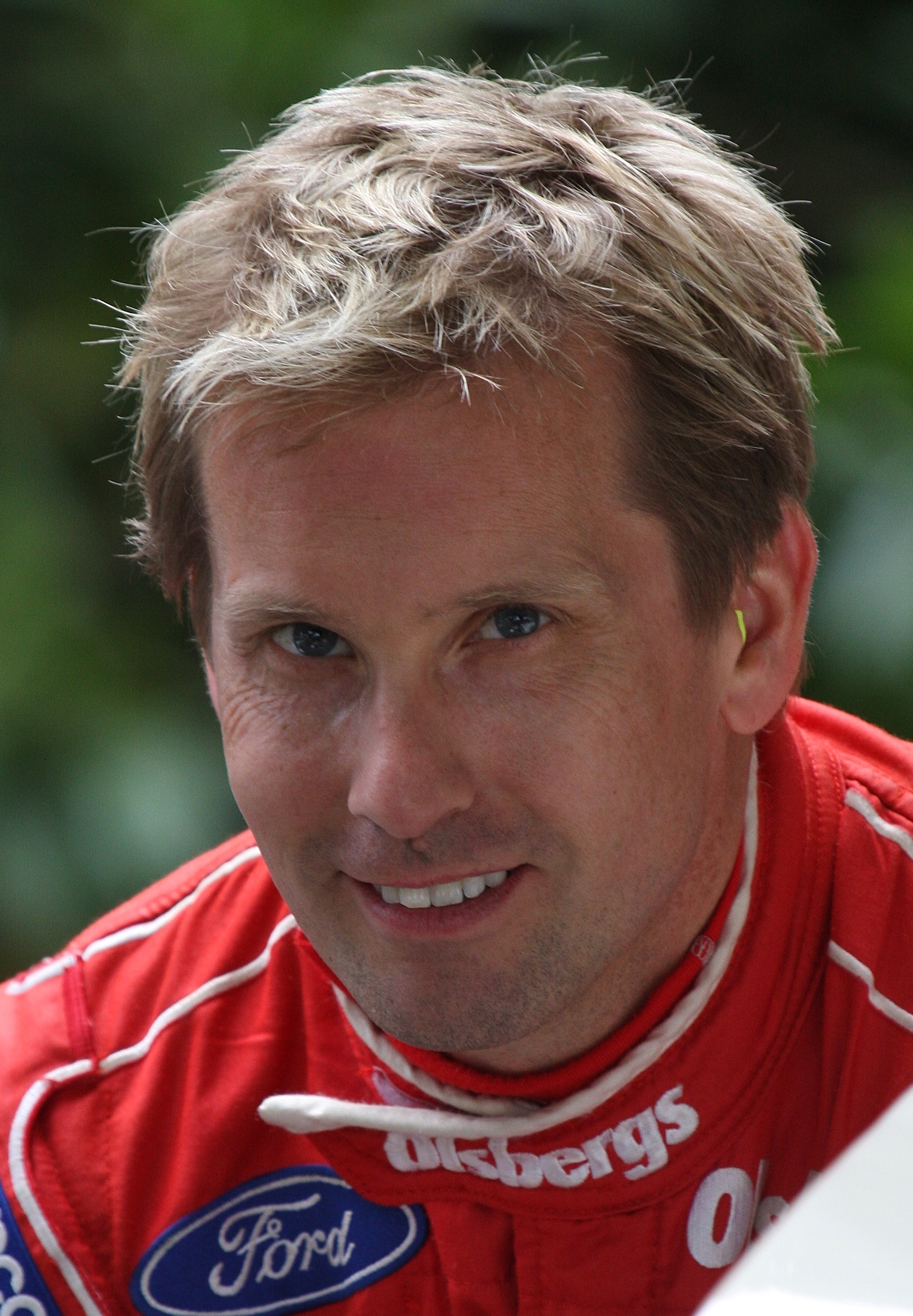
Kenny Bräck (pictured in 2011) won the race, which finished under caution due to Zanardi's accident.

On race day, a 30-minute warm-up session was held before the event began; Kanaan again posted the fastest time (35.288 seconds), followed by Zanardi and Paul Tracy. The 154-lap race began at 1:56 p.m. local time; Bräck immediately took the lead, and Andretti went into second coming out of the first turn. They remained the top two in lap 20, with Dario Franchitti in third. Six laps later, Andretti passed Franchitti to reclaim second when the latter was unable to pass a slower car. Drivers near the lead begin making their first round of pit stops on lap 35, and continued doing so through lap 40. Around that time, Bryan Herta and Cristiano da Matta experienced problems with their cars and became the first two drivers to retire from the race. By lap 60, Bräck had built a lead of more than seven seconds. Carpentier had moved into second place, and Andretti, Tagliani, and Franchitti rounded out the top five. Bräck relinquished his lead on lap 64, when he went off course while attempting to lap Junqueira. The first caution flag of the day came out, but not before Carpentier took the lead as Bräck regained control of his car and re-entered the track in second place. Pit stops took place during the caution, with Carpentier, Bräck, and Andretti still in the top three positions.

Green flag racing resumed on lap 70, and Kanaan began moving toward the front of the field; he passed Andretti for third place on lap 73, and took second from Bräck four laps later. The second caution of the race occurred on lap 80, when Junqueira and Toranosuke Takagi collided; Takagi spun off the track, but was able to continue. Andretti and Franchitti made pit stops during the caution, and the green flag came out on lap 85. Kanaan passed Carpentier on lap 95, and Zanardi went into second shortly afterward, as Carpentier tried conserving fuel to complete the race with one fewer pit stop than the other contenders. Kanaan, Zanardi, and Bräck made pit stops from laps 105 to 113, and Andretti inherited the lead. Franchitti suffered a "mechanical problem" on lap 116 and had to retire from the race. More pit stops occurred from laps 121 to 123, and Zanardi claimed the lead over Kanaan. The two contested the lead, and Kanaan was two-tenths of a second behind Zanardi when he made a pit stop for the final time on lap 141. Bräck moved up to second, and was followed by Carpentier and Tagliani.

=== Zanardi accident and finish ===
Zanardi went onto pit road for his last stop on lap 142. When attempting to re-enter the track, "he seemed to accelerate too early", according to the Associated Press' recap. Zanardi could not control his vehicle's rear end, and the car slid sideways onto the track, after having gone through grass. After Carpentier veered up the track to narrowly miss Zanardi's car, Tagliani drove straight into it at an estimated speed of 200 mph (320 km/h). The impact split Zanardi's chassis into two pieces and littered the circuit with debris. The drivers were taken by airlift to the Klinikum Berlin-Marzahn hospital. Following the accident, the last 12 laps were run under a caution flag. There was one further retirement, on lap 153; Christian Fittipaldi made a pit stop due to a fire in the back of his car and dropped out. Bräck won the race, finishing ahead of Papis and Carpentier, who were second and third respectively. Andretti took fourth place, followed by Oriol Servià in fifth, Takagi in sixth, and Kanaan in seventh. De Ferran, Scott Dixon, and Tracy rounded out the top ten.

=== Post-race ===
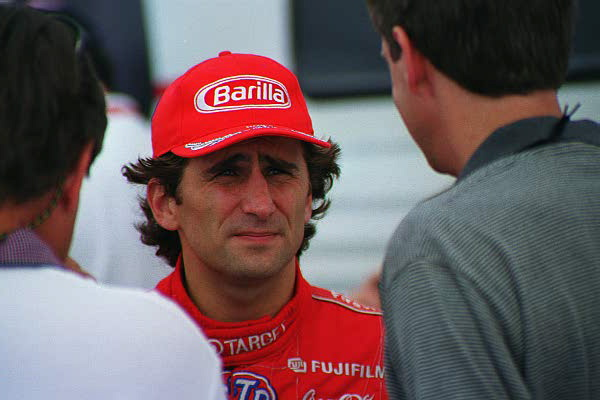
Alex Zanardi (center, pictured in 1998) was involved in a life-threatening accident with 12 laps remaining.

According to CART physician Dr. Steve Olvey, Zanardi's condition when he left the track was "extremely critical". The crash had been life-threatening. It caused a traumatic amputation of both of his legs, the entire left leg from the thigh down and the right leg from the knee down. This resulted in the loss of 75% of his blood volume; last rites were given to him afterward. Upon arriving at Klinikum Berlin-Marzahn, Zanardi underwent a three-hour surgery to clean and close the wounds. He also fractured his pelvis and suffered a concussion. Tagliani had a sore back as a result of the accident, and was released from the hospital after one day. On September 17, one of Zanardi's doctors said that his life was not in danger, although he had been placed under an induced coma in an attempt to prevent trauma shock. Doctors took Zanardi off the coma three days later, and he left Klinikum Berlin-Marzahn on October 30.

Johnny Herbert, who had previously been Zanardi's teammate in Formula One, said of the incident, "It's a big shock to everybody. You have accidents, yes, but you don't expect something this gruesome." Laz Denes, a spokesman for Zanardi's Mo Nunn Racing team, said the impact was "immense, almost harder than anything I've ever seen." According to Denes, the point of contact "was about 12 inches past the cockpit," and he called Zanardi's survival a "miracle". Tagliani commented several days after the crash that Zanardi was constantly in his thoughts. During his hospital stay, Zanardi contacted Tagliani and told him that he was not at fault.

With his victory, Bräck claimed the lead in the points competition; with five races left in the season, he had 131 points. De Ferran was in second, 11 points behind Bräck, and Andretti was five points further back. Castroneves was 20 points out of the lead, in fourth place. Dixon trailed Bräck by 45 points, and was in front of Franchitti by one point. Carpentier's top-three finish left him in seventh, with 83 points, while Cristiano da Matta was five points behind him.

In 2002, the German 500 was not held after the EuroSpeedway filed for insolvency. The race returned to EuroSpeedway the following year, as did Zanardi, who ran 13 demonstration laps to represent those that he never completed in 2001.

== Classification ==
=== Race ===
Race results
Pos	No.	Driver	Team	Laps	Time/retired	Grid	Points
1	8	Kenny Bräck (Sweden)	Team Rahal	154	2:00:20.940	2	21
2	7	Max Papis (Italy)	Team Rahal	154	+0.154	16	16
3	32	Patrick Carpentier (Canada)	Forsythe Racing	154	+2.804	9	14
4	39	Michael Andretti (US)	Team Motorola	154	+4.699	4	12
5	22	Oriol Servià (Spain)	Sigma Autosport	154	+5.225	20	10
6	5	Toranosuke Takagi (Japan)	Walker Racing	154	+6.410	26	8
7	55	Tony Kanaan (Brazil)	Mo Nunn Racing	154	+6.647	10	6
8	1	Gil de Ferran (Brazil)	Team Penske	154	+9.262	1	5
9	18	Scott Dixon (New Zealand)	PacWest Racing	154	+9.893	6	4
10	26	Paul Tracy (Canada)	Team Green	154	+10.324	11	3
11	4	Bruno Junqueira (Brazil)	Chip Ganassi Racing	154	+12.987	15	2
12	3	Hélio Castroneves (Brazil)	Team Penske	154	+14.929	3	1
13	19	Townsend Bell (US)	Patrick Racing	154	+18.469	27	—
14	12	Memo Gidley (US)	Chip Ganassi Racing	153	+1 lap	18	—
15	40	Jimmy Vasser (US)	Patrick Racing	153	+1 lap	14	—
16	17	Maurício Gugelmin (Brazil)	PacWest Racing	152	+2 laps	23	—
17	16	Michel Jourdain Jr. (Mexico)	Bettenhausen Racing	151	+3 laps	21	—
18	25	Max Wilson (Brazil)	Arciero-Blair Racing	149	+5 laps	24	—
19	11	Christian Fittipaldi (Brazil)	Newman-Haas Racing	148	Engine	12	—
20	66	Alex Zanardi (Italy)	Mo Nunn Racing	142	Collision	22	—
21	33	Alex Tagliani (Canada)	Forsythe Racing	142	Collision	13	—
22	52	Shinji Nakano (Japan)	Fernández Racing	142	Electrical	25	—
23	20	Roberto Moreno (Brazil)	Patrick Racing	130	Engine	8	—
24	51	Adrián Fernández (Mexico)	Fernandez Racing	120	Engine	17	—
25	27	Dario Franchitti (UK)	Team Green	115	Engine	5	—
26	6	Cristiano da Matta (Brazil)	Newman-Haas Racing	37	Gearbox	7	—
27	77	Bryan Herta (US)	Forsythe Racing	31	Electrical	19	—

== Standings after the race ==
Drivers' Championship standings
Rank	+/–	Driver	Points
1	2	Kenny Bräck (Sweden)	131
2	1	Gil de Ferran (Brazil)	120
3	1	Michael Andretti (US)	115
4	2	Hélio Castroneves (Brazil)	111
5	1	Scott Dixon (New Zealand)	86

Constructors' standings
Rank	+/–	Constructor	Points
1		Reynard (UK)	286
2		Lola (UK)	244

Manufacturers' standings
Rank	+/–	Manufacturer	Points
1		Honda (Japan)	257
2	1	Ford Cosworth (UK)	224
3	1	Toyota (Japan)	222
Sources:

- Note: Only the top five positions are included for the drivers' standings.

Previous race: 2001 Molson Indy Vancouver	CART FedEx Championship Series; 2001 season	Next race: 2001 Rockingham 500
Previous race: N/A	2001 American Memorial	Next race: 2003 German 500
