= Bruno Junqueira =

Brazilian racing driver

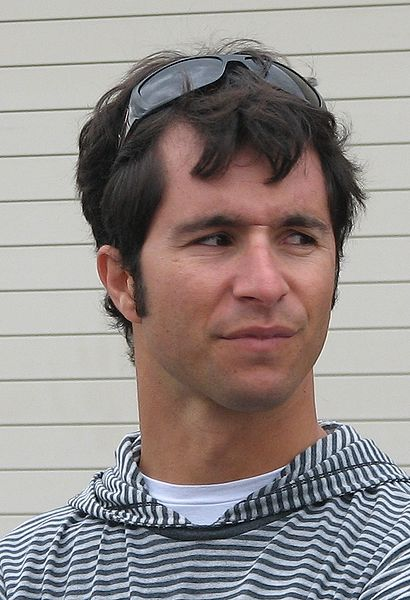
- Junqueira at the Indianapolis Motor Speedway, May 2009
- Nationality: (Brazil) Brazilian
- Born: Bruno Furtado Junqueira; November 4, 1976 (age 50) Belo Horizonte, Brazil

IRL IndyCar Series career
- Debut season: 2001
- Current team: FAZZT Race Team
- Categorisation: FIA Gold (until 2019); FIA Silver (2024–)
- Car number: 33
- Former teams: Dale Coyne Racing; Chip Ganassi Racing; Newman/Haas Racing
- Starts: 23
- Wins: 0
- Poles: 1
- Fastest laps: 0
- Best finish: 20th in 2008

CART/Champ Car World Series
- Years active: 2001–2007
- Teams: Chip Ganassi Racing; Newman/Haas Racing; Dale Coyne Racing
- Starts: 101
- Wins: 8
- Poles: 9
- Best finish: 2nd in 2002, 2003, 2004

Previous series
- 1998–2000 1995–1997: International Formula 3000; Formula Three Sudamericana

Championship titles
- 2000 1997: International Formula 3000; Formula Three Sudamericana

Bruno Furtado Junqueira (born November 4, 1976) is a Brazilian professional racing driver who most recently competed in the IRL IndyCar Series. He is a former Formula 3000 champion and three-time runner-up in the Champ Car World Series.

== Racing career ==
=== Early career ===
Junqueira started racing karts in Brazil and dominated Formula Three Sudamericana before moving to Formula 3000. He tested for the Williams Formula One team for many years, and came close to landing a race drive in 2000, losing out to Jenson Button. He rebounded from this setback, winning that year's International Formula 3000 Championship.

=== Champ Car ===
In 2001, Junqueira joined the CART Championship Car series driving for Chip Ganassi Racing where he had immediate success, capturing a win in his fourteenth race and finished second in points with two wins the following year. In 2003 Ganassi left to the rival Indy Racing League and Junqueira joined Newman/Haas Racing, the top team remaining in what was now the Champ Car World Series. He captured series runner up honors in both 2003 and 2004, capturing two wins in each of those seasons. He also drove in the Indianapolis 500 four times for both Ganassi and Newman/Haas in one-off appearances. In 2002, he qualified for the pole position, and he twice finished fifth in the race.

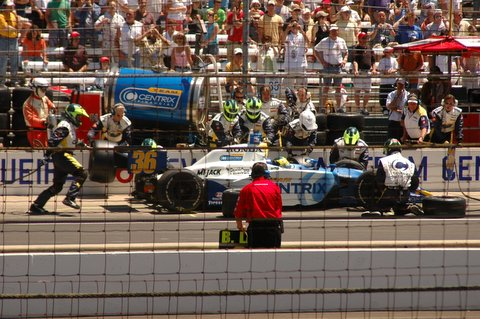
Junqueira at the 2005 Indy 500

In the 2005 Indianapolis 500, Junqueira crashed head-on into the turn two wall after he passed backmarker A. J. Foyt IV, but Foyt inattentively did not see Junqueira's car under him and struck his right-rear corner. He suffered a concussion and a fractured vertebrae and missed the remainder of the 2005 Champ Car season. Junqueira was the Champ Car points leader at the time, having won the second race of the year in Monterrey, Mexico. Veteran Oriol Servia took his place and finished runner-up in the standings.

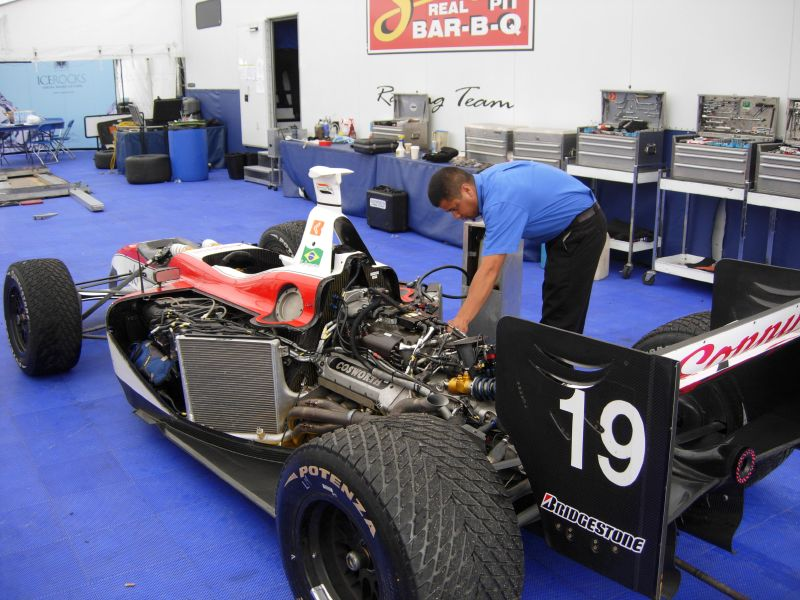
Junqueira's 2007 Champ Car

In 2006, Junqueira returned to the cockpit at Newman/Haas but for the first time in his career he did not win a race and only finished fifth in the championship while his teammate Sébastien Bourdais won his third straight title. He was replaced in the second Newman/Haas car in 2007 by rookie Graham Rahal and Junqueira signed to drive for Dale Coyne Racing as teammate to the inexperienced Katherine Legge. Junquiera finished seventh in the championship including three consecutive podium finishes late in the season.

=== IndyCar Series ===
Prior to the 2008 Indycar Series Season, Champ Car unified with the rival Indy Racing League. Junqueira drove the No. 18 car for the Coyne team's first season in the new series, alongside Brazilian rookie countryman Mario Moraes. His Indianapolis 500 was ruined by a mirror falling off, causing him to lose three laps during repairs. His season was not a great success, as he finished twentieth overall with only two top-ten finishes, both on road courses.

Junqueira was out of a drive for 2009. He made a deal with Conquest Racing for the Indianapolis 500 and qualified the car on Bump Day, but was asked to withdraw for the team's regular driver Alex Tagliani, who had failed to qualify his car due to a technical failure.

In 2011, driving for A. J. Foyt Racing, Junqueira qualified his car for the 500 in nineteenth position, only to once again have to give up his chance to drive in the actual race. Foyt sold the unsponsored car's entry to Andretti Autosport, whose driver Ryan Hunter-Reay had been the final car bumped from the field. In 2012, he entered in for an injured Josef Newgarden at the first Grand Prix of Baltimore.

== Racing record ==
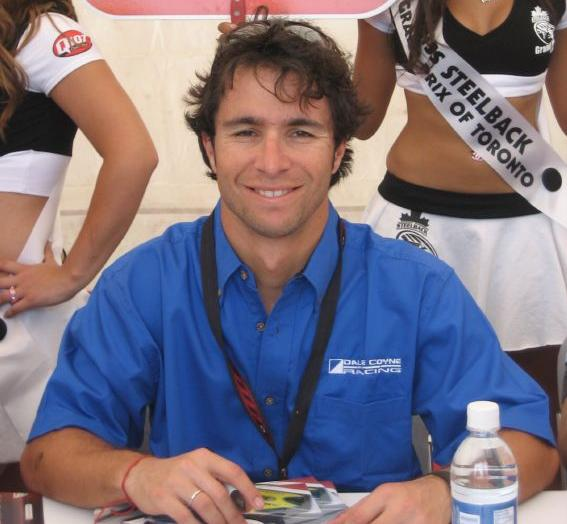
Junqueira in 2007

=== Career summary ===
Season	Series	Team name	Races	Poles	Wins	Points	Position
1997	Formula Three Sudamericana	PropCar Racing	12	4	7	171	**1st**
1998	Intl. Formula 3000	Draco Racing	12	0	0	3	14th
1999	Intl. Formula 3000	Den Blå Avis	10	1	1	20	5th
1999	Intl. Formula 3000	Petrobras Junior Team	10	1	1	20	5th
1999	Formula One	Williams-Supertec	Test driver				
2000	Intl. Formula 3000	Petrobras Junior Team	10	2	4	48	**1st**
2001	CART World Series	Ganassi	20	1	1	68	16th
2001	Indy Racing League	Ganassi	1	0	0	30	37th
2002	CART World Series	Ganassi	19	4	2	164	**2nd**
2002	Indy Racing League	Ganassi	1	1	0	1	51st
2003	CART World Series	Newman/Haas	18	2	2	199	**2nd**
2004	Champ Car World Series	Newman/Haas	14	1	2	341	**2nd**
2004	IndyCar Series	Newman/Haas	1	0	0	30	28th
2005	Champ Car World Series	Newman/Haas	2	0	1	59	19th
2005	IndyCar Series	Newman/Haas	1	0	0	10	36th
2006	Champ Car World Series	Newman/Haas	14	1	0	219	5th
2006–07	A1 Grand Prix	A1 Team Brazil	6	0	0	9	18th
2007	Champ Car World Series	Dale Coyne	14	0	0	233	7th
2007–08	A1 Grand Prix	A1 Team Brazil	4	0	0	44	14th
2008	IndyCar Series	Dale Coyne	17	0	0	256	20th
2010	IndyCar Series	FAZZT Race Team	1	0	0	13	39th
2010	Fórmula Truck	DF Motorsport	10	0	0	22	17th
2011	American Le Mans Series - GT	RSR Racing	8	0	0	6	26th
2011	Stock Car Brasil	Bassani	2	0	0	2	29th
2012	American Le Mans Series - PC	RSR Racing	10	0	1	118	**3rd**
2012	Stock Car Brasil	Bassani	1	0	0	2	34st
2013	American Le Mans Series - PC	RSR Racing	9	0	1	95	7th
2014	United SportsCar Championship - PC	RSR Racing	10	0	0	201	10th
2014	Stock Car Brasil	Full Time Sports	1	0	0	0	NC
2015	United SportsCar Championship - PC	RSR Racing	10	1	2	301	**3rd**
2016	IMSA SportsCar Championship - PC	BAR1 Motorsports	2	0	0	56	21st
2017	IMSA SportsCar Championship - PC	BAR1 Motorsports	1	0	0	32	18th
2017	NASCAR Whelen Euro Series - Elite 1	Mishumotors	2	0	0	57	37th
2018	IMSA SportsCar Championship - GTD	3GT Racing	1	0	0	16	59th
2026	Michelin Pilot Challenge - TCR	Baker Racing					

* Includes points scored by other Team Brazil drivers.

=== Complete International Formula 3000 results ===
(key) (Races in bold indicate pole position; races in italics indicate fastest lap.)

Year	Entrant	1	2	3	4	5	6	7	8	9	10	11	12	DC	Points
1998	Draco Engineering	OSC; Ret	IMO; 16	CAT; 16	SIL; 9	MON; Ret	PAU; Ret	A1R; 6	HOC; 5	HUN; Ret	SPA; Ret	PER; 18	NÜR; Ret	18th	3
1999	Den Blå Avis Petrobras Junior Team	IMO; Ret	MON; 6	CAT; 4	**MAG**; Ret	SIL; 2	A1R; DNQ	HOC; 1	HUN; 15	SPA; Ret	NÜR; 16			5th	20
2000	Petrobras Junior Team	**IMO**; 2	SIL; 5	CAT; 1	NÜR; 1	MON; 1	MAG; 13	A1R; 7	HOC; Ret	**HUN**; 1	SPA; 9			**1st**	**48**

=== American open–wheel racing results ===
(key)

==== CART/Champ Car Series ====
Year	Team	No.	Chassis	Engine	1	2	3	4	5	6	7	8	9	10	11	12	13	14	15	16	17	18	19	20	21	Rank	Points	Ref
2001	Chip Ganassi Racing	4	Lola B01/00	Toyota RV8E	MTY; 22	LBH; 9	TXS; NH	**NZR**; 7	MOT; 24	MIL; 4	DET; 19	POR; 23	CLE; 23	TOR; 13	MIS; 9	CHI; 17	MDO; 13	ROA; 1	VAN; 12	LAU; 11	ROC; 25	HOU; 23	LS; 7	SRF; 21	FON; 4	16th	**68**	
2002	Target Chip Ganassi Racing	4	Lola B02/00	Toyota	MTY; 11	LBH; 17	**MOT**; 1	MIL; 10	LS; 4	POR; 2	CHI; 2	TOR; 14	CLE; 13	VAN; 9	MDO; 4	**ROA**; 3	MTL; 13	**DEN**; 1	ROC; 5	MIA; 5	SRF; 14	FON; 9	**MXC**; 3			2nd	**164**	
2003	Newman/Haas Racing	1	Lola B02/00	Ford XFE	STP; 3	MTY; 5	LBH; 3	BRH; 2	LAU; 4	MIL; 17	LS; 2	POR; 4	CLE; 3	TOR; 3	VAN; 2	**ROA**; 1	MDO; 13	MTL; 13	**DEN**; 1	MIA; 9	MXC; 7	SRF; 15	FON; NH			2nd	**199**	
2004	Newman/Haas Racing	6	Lola B02/00	Ford XFE	**LBH**; 2	MTY; 2	MIL; 6	POR; 2	CLE; 2	TOR; 18	VAN; 4	ROA; 15	DEN; 3	MTL; 1	LS; 2	LSV; 2	SRF; 1	MXC; 2								2nd	**341**^{^}	
2005	Newman/Haas Racing	2	Lola B02/00	Ford XFE	LBH; 3	MTY; 1	MIL	POR	CLE	TOR	EDM	SJO	DEN	MTL	LSV	SRF	MXC									19th	**59**	
2006	Newman/Haas Racing	2	Lola B02/00	Ford XFE	LBH; 15	HOU; 10	MTY; 10	MIL; 15	**POR**; 4	CLE; 2	TOR; 8	EDM; 15	SJO; 17	DEN; 2	MTL; 12	ROA; 2	SRF; 6	MXC; 4								5th	**219**	
2007	Dale Coyne Racing	19	Panoz DP01	Cosworth XFE	LSV; 7	LBH; 6	HOU; 7	POR; 13	CLE; 16	MTL; 17	TOR; 5	EDM; 7	SJO; 7	ROA; 9	ZOL; 2	ASN; 3	SRF; 3	MXC; 7								7th	**233**	

^ New points system implemented in 2004.

==== IndyCar Series ====
Year	Team	No.	Chassis	Engine	1	2	3	4	5	6	7	8	9	10	11	12	13	14	15	16	17	18	19	Rank	Points	Ref
2001	Chip Ganassi Racing	50	G-Force	Oldsmobile	PHX	HMS	ATL	INDY; 5	TXS	PPIR	RIR	KAN	NSH	KTY	STL	CHI	TX2							37th	30	
2002	Chip Ganassi Racing	33	G-Force	Chevrolet	HMS	PHX	FON	NZR	**INDY**; 31	TXS	PPIR	RIR	KAN	NSH	MIS	KTY	STL	CHI	TX2					51st	1	
2004	Newman/Haas Racing	36	G-Force	Honda	HMS	PHX	MOT	INDY; 5	TXS	RIR	KAN	NSH	MIL	MIS	KTY	PPIR	NZR	CHI	FON	TX2				28th	30	
2005	Newman/Haas Racing	36	Panoz	Honda	HMS	PHX	STP	MOT	INDY; 30	TXS	RIR	KAN	NSH	MIL	MIS	KTY	PPIR	SNM	CHI	WGL	FON			36th	10	
2008	Dale Coyne Racing	18	Dallara	Honda	HMS; 23	STP; 24	MOT^{1} DNP		KAN; 15	INDY; 20	MIL; 18	TXS; 15	IOW; DNS	RIR; 23	WGL; 6	NSH; 15	MDO; 13	EDM; 14	KTY; 14	SNM; 17	DET; 7	CHI; 20	SRF^{2} 15	20th	256	
2008	Dale Coyne Racing	18	Panoz DP01	Cosworth XFE				LBH^{1} 12																20th	256	
2009	Conquest Racing	36	Dallara	Honda	STP	LBH	KAN	INDY; Rpl	MIL	TXS	IOW	RIR	WGL	TOR	EDM	KTY	MDO	SNM	CHI	MOT	HMS			NC	-	
2010	FAZZT Race Team	33	Dallara	Honda	SAO	STP	ALA	LBH	KAN	INDY; 32	TXS	IOW	WGL	TOR	EDM	MDO	SNM	CHI	KTY	MOT	HMS			39th	13	
2011	A. J. Foyt Enterprises	41	Dallara	Honda	STP	ALA	LBH	SAO	INDY; Rpl	TXS1	TXS2	MIL	IOW	TOR	EDM	MDO	NHM	SNM	BAL	MOT	KTY	LVS		47th	4	
2012	Sarah Fisher Hartman Racing	67	Dallara DW12	Honda	STP	ALA	LBH	SAO	INDY	DET	TXS	MIL	IOW	TOR	EDM	MDO	SNM	BAL; 19	FON					35th	12	

^{1} Races run on same day.
^{2} Non-points-paying, exhibition race.

Years	Teams	Races	Poles	Wins	Podiums (Non-win)	Top 10s (Non-podium)	Indianapolis 500 Wins	Championships
9	7	26	1	0	0	4	0	0

==== Indianapolis 500 ====
Year	Chassis	Engine	Start	Finish	Team
2001	G-Force	Oldsmobile	20	5	Chip Ganassi Racing
2002	G-Force	Chevrolet	**1**	31	Chip Ganassi Racing
2004	G-Force	Honda	4	5	Newman/Haas Racing
2005	Panoz	Honda	12	30	Newman/Haas Racing
2008	Dallara	Honda	15	20	Dale Coyne Racing
2009	Dallara	Honda	Replaced by A. Tagliani		Conquest Racing
2010	Dallara	Honda	25	32	FAZZT Race Team
2011	Dallara	Honda	Replaced by R. Hunter-Reay		A. J. Foyt Enterprises

=== Complete American Le Mans Series results ===
Year	Entrant	Class	Chassis	Engine	Tyres	1	2	3	4	5	6	7	8	9	10	Rank	Points
2006	Multimatic Motorsports Team Panoz	GT2	Panoz Esperante GT-LM	Ford (Élan) 5.0L V8	**P**	SEB ovr:Ret cls:Ret	TEX	MID	LIM	UTA	POR	AME	MOS	PET	MON	NC	-
2011	Jaguar RSR	GT	Jaguar XKR GT2	Jaguar 5.0 L V8	**D**	SEB ovr:Ret cls:Ret	LNB ovr:12 cls:6	LIM ovr:Ret cls:Ret	MOS ovr:29 cls:15	MID ovr:21 cls:12	AME ovr:Ret cls:Ret	BAL ovr:DNS cls:DNS	MON ovr:Ret cls:Ret	PET ovr:Ret cls:Ret		26th	6
2012	RSR Racing	PC	Oreca FLM09	Chevrolet LS3 6.2 L V8	**M**	SEB ovr:51 cls:7	LNB ovr:30 cls:7	MON ovr:4 cls:2	LIM ovr:27 cls:5	MOS ovr:6 cls:1	MID ovr:10 cls:4	AME ovr:8 cls:4	BAL ovr:10 cls:2	VIR ovr:12 cls:4	PET ovr:8 cls:2	**3rd**	**118**
2013	RSR Racing	PC	Oreca FLM09	Chevrolet LS3 6.2 L V8	**C**	SEB ovr:12 cls:4	LNB ovr:5 cls:3	MON ovr:29 cls:7	LIM ovr:5 cls:1	MOS ovr:21 cls:5	AME ovr:3 cls:1	BAL ovr:Ret cls:Ret	COTA ovr:12 cls:6	VIR	PET ovr:Ret cls:Ret	7th	95

=== Complete A1 Grand Prix results ===
(key) (Races in bold indicate pole position) (Races in italics indicate fastest lap)

Year	Entrant	1	2	3	4	5	6	7	8	9	10	11	12	13	14	15	16	17	18	19	20	21	22	DC	Points
2006–07	Brazil	NED; SPR	NED; FEA	CZE; SPR	CZE; FEA	BEI; SPR	BEI; FEA	MYS; SPR	MYS; FEA	IDN; SPR	IDN; FEA	NZL; SPR	NZL; FEA	AUS; SPR	AUS; FEA	RSA; SPR; 17	RSA; FEA; 7	MEX; SPR; Ret	MEX; FEA; 13	SHA; SPR	SHA; FEA	GBR; SPR; 12	GBR; SPR; Ret	18th	9
2007–08	Brazil	NED; SPR	NED; FEA	CZE; SPR	CZE; FEA	MYS; SPR	MYS; FEA	ZHU; SPR	ZHU; FEA	NZL; SPR	NZL; FEA	AUS; SPR	AUS; FEA	RSA; SPR; Ret	RSA; FEA; 9	MEX; SPR; 10	MEX; FEA; 8	SHA; SPR	SHA; FEA	GBR; SPR	GBR; SPR			11th	44

=== Complete Stock Car Brasil results ===
Year	Team	Car	1	2	3	4	5	6	7	8	9	10	11	12	13	14	15	16	17	18	19	20	21	Rank	Points
2011	RC3 Bassani	Peugeot 408	CTB	INT	RBP	VEL	CGD	RIO	INT	SAL	SCZ	LON	BSB; 14	VEL; 22										30th	2
2012	RC3 Bassani	Peugeot 408	INT	CTB	VEL	RBP	LON	RIO	SAL; 19	CAS	TAR	CTB	BSB	INT										34th	2
2014	Full Time Sports	Chevrolet Sonic	INT; 1 Ret	SCZ; 1	SCZ; 2	BRA; 1	BRA; 2	GOI; 1	GOI; 2	GOI; 1	CAS; 1	CAS; 2	CUR; 1	CUR; 2	VEL; 1	VEL; 2	SCZ; 1	SCZ; 2	TAR; 1	TAR; 2	SAL; 1	SAL; 2	CUR; 1	NC†	0†

† Ineligible for championship points.

=== Complete WeatherTech SportsCar Championship results ===
Year	Team	Class	Chassis	Engine	1	2	3	4	5	6	7	8	9	10	11	Rank	Points
2014	RSR Racing	PC	Oreca FLM09	Chevrolet LS3 6.2 L V8	DAY; 9†	**SEB**; 2	**LGA**; 3	KAN; 6	WGL; 9	IMS; 2	**ELK**; 9†	VIR; 4	AUS; 11†	ATL; 9		10th	201
2015	RSR Racing	PC	Oreca FLM09	Chevrolet LS3 6.2 L V8	DAY; 4	SEB; 6	LGA; 1	BEL; 5	WGL; 6	MOS; 4	LIM; 2	ELK; 1	AUS; 2	ATL; 6		3rd	301
2016	BAR1 Motorsports	PC	Oreca FLM09	Chevrolet LS3 6.2 L V8	DAY	SEB	LBH	LGA	BEL	WGL	MOS	LIM	ELK; 5	AUS; 4	ATL	21st	56
2017	BAR1 Motorsports	PC	Oreca FLM09	Chevrolet LS3 6.2 L V8	DAY	SEB	AUS	BEL; 2	WGL	MOS	ELK	ATL				18th	32
2018	3GT Racing	GTD	Lexus RC F GT3	Lexus 5.0 L V8	DAY; 15	SEB	MOH	BEL	WGL	MOS	LIM	ELK	VIR	LGA	ATL	59th	16

† Did not complete sufficient laps in order to score points.

Sporting positions
Preceded by Gabriel Furlán	Formula Three Sudamericana Champion; 1997	Succeeded by Gabriel Furlán
Preceded by Nick Heidfeld	International Formula 3000 Champion; 2000	Succeeded by Justin Wilson
