= 2003 London Champ Car Trophy =

Fourth race of the 2003 CART season

(United Kingdom) 2003 Brands Hatch
Race details
- Race 4 of 18 in the 2003 CART season
- Brands Hatch Indy Circuit Layout
- Date: 5 May, 2003
- Official name: The London Champ Car Trophy
- Location: Brands Hatch Indy Circuit, West Kingsdown, Kent, England, United Kingdom
- Course: Permanent Road Course; 1.192 mi / 1.918 km
- Distance: 165 laps 196.680 mi / 316.470 km
- Weather: Partly Cloudy

Pole position
- Driver: (Canada) Paul Tracy (Forsythe Racing)
- Time: 37.006

Fastest lap
- Driver: (Mexico) Adrián Fernández (Fernández Racing)
- Time: 38.210 (on lap 152 of 165)

Podium
- First: (France) Sébastien Bourdais (Newman/Haas Racing)
- Second: (Brazil) Bruno Junqueira (Newman/Haas Racing)
- Third: (Mexico) Mario Domínguez (Herdez Competition)

The 2003 London Champ Car Trophy was a Championship Auto Racing Teams (CART) open-wheel race held on 5 May 2003 at the Brands Hatch Indy Circuit in West Kingsdown, Kent, England in front of a crowd of just under 40,000 spectators. It was the fourth round of the 2003 Champ Car World Series, the first American open wheel car race at the track since 1978, and the first of two European races of the season. Newman/Haas Racing's Sébastien Bourdais won the 165-lap race starting from second position. His teammate Bruno Junqueira finished second and Mario Domínguez of Herdez Competition took third.

Paul Tracy, the pre-race points leader, won his first pole position in three years by posting the fastest lap in qualifying and he maintained the lead for the next 54 laps before entering the pit lane for fuel and tyres. Bourdais remained on the circuit for one extra lap because he had conserved fuel and had a faster pit stop than his teammate, who was delayed by the slower car of Rodolfo Lavín, to take the lead. Bourdais and Tracy exchanged the fastest lap of the race as they stayed within a second of each other until Tracy's engine failed on the 118th lap. Bourdais was unchallenged for the remainder of the race as he scythed his way past slower traffic to achieve his first CART victory. There were two cautions and three lead changes amongst three different drivers during the course of the race.

The final positions meant Tracy still led the Drivers' Championship with 65 points but Junqueira lowered it to 11 points. Michel Jourdain Jr. maintained third position with fellow Mexican Adrián Fernández remaining in fourth place and Patrick Carpentier fifth. With 88 points, Lola increased their Constructors' Championship lead over Reynard to 54 points with 14 races left in the season.

== Background ==
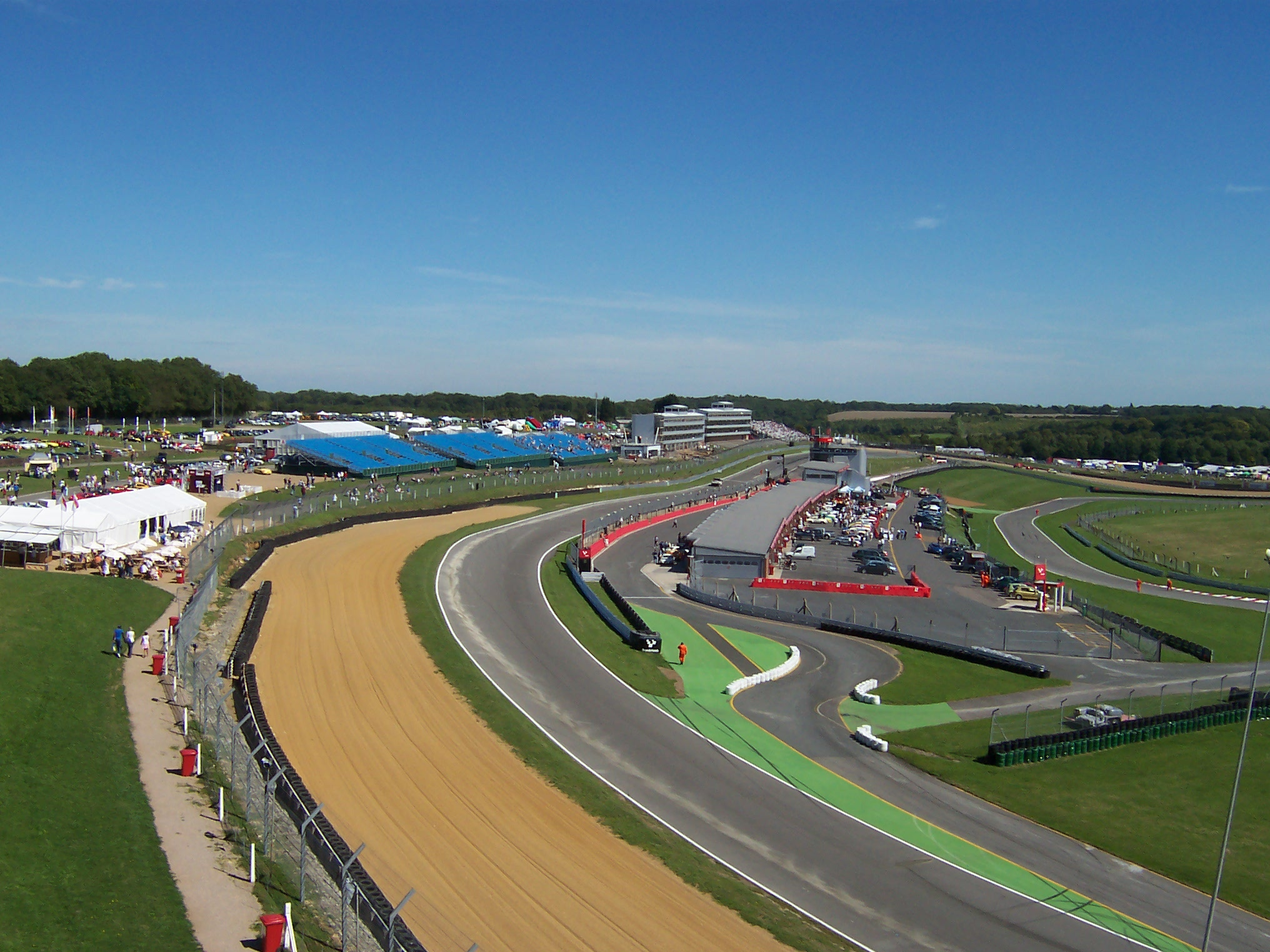
Brands Hatch (pictured in 2005), where the race was held

The 2003 London Champ Car Trophy was the inaugural running of the event, and the start of a two-week European stretch for the Championship Auto Racing Teams (CART) series; the German 500 was held at EuroSpeedway Lausitz in Klettwitz, Germany one week later. It was the fourth round of 18 in the 2003 Champ Car World Series and was held at the 1.172 mi (1.886 km) Brands Hatch road course circuit in West Kingsdown, Kent, England on 5 May 2003 over 165 laps. The British Formula Ford Championship, the British Touring Car Championship, Formula Renault, Porsche Cup and Renault Clio Cup UK held support races during the weekend. Entering the race, Paul Tracy led the Drivers' Championship with 64 points, ahead of Bruno Junqueira with 38 points and Michel Jourdain Jr. with 34. Adrián Fernández was fourth with 28 points, and Jimmy Vasser was fifth with 20 points. With 66 points, Lola led their rivals Reynard in the Manufacturers' Championship by 36 points.

CART had not visited Brands Hatch since 1978 when Rick Mears won for Team Penske. The series held two previous events in the United Kingdom at the Rockingham Motor Speedway in Corby, which was dropped from the season schedule in November 2002 because of poor attendance and inclement weather. Brands Hatch's return was publicly announced at the Autosport International Show in Birmingham on 9 January 2003, and it was held on the Indy configuration. CART president and CEO Chris Pook cited the track's proximity from London and the history of the Brands Hatch circuit as the primary reasons of hosting the race there. He also stated that the Brands Hatch Grand Prix configuration could not be used because of the high cost of upgrading it to CART standards. It was part of CART's desire to distance itself from the Indy Racing League by holding races outside the United States.

Brands Hatch and CART invested $2 million in enhancing the track's safety standards; 2 mi (3.2 km) of fencing was erected around each side of the Indy layout, around 38,000 tyres were used to construct barriers and most of the guard-railing alongside the circuit was reconstructed. The improvements were completed on the day before the official announcement of the race. Tim Mayer, CART's international and development liaison officer, admitted more efforts were needed to upgrade the track to obtain an FIA Grade 2 licence for a potential future event on the Grand Prix layout and noted that its history had to be regarded when altering it for increased space:

"We have garages here that are twenty-six feet long and we have cars that are sixteen feet long and each team brings two cars. So you figure out very quickly that the garages are not big enough. You look at the paddock and realize that it’s going to be tight getting all our equipment in there. And of course we’ve done a lot of work to get enough barrier protection around the track. A lot of people have worked very hard to get it done."

Championship leader Tracy said he was excited to race at Brands Hatch and felt the circuit would be challenging to drive. He had won the previous three races of the season, and aimed to secure his fourth consecutive victory, but said he was not thinking about his recent success. After starting from pole position in two of the three opening rounds of the season but retiring from the lead in both races, Sébastien Bourdais of Newman/Haas Racing said he wanted to win the race because of its proximity to his home country France. He felt the two qualifying sessions would be influential in deciding its outcome and believed overtakes would be sparse. Walker Racing's Darren Manning said that he hoped he would perform well at the circuit since Brands Hatch was the only track on the CART schedule he had previously raced on.

== Practice and qualifying ==
Two 50-minute practice sessions on 3 May and a third 75-minute session on the morning of 4 May preceded the race. Manning lapped fastest in the first practice session at 37.953 seconds, ahead of Junqueira and Tracy. Tiago Monteiro spun at Surtees corner but avoided damaging his car. Fernández caused the session to be suspended when he spun backwards into a tyre barrier at Surtees corner, which caused heavy damage to his car's rear; he was unhurt. Tracy led the second practice session, at 37.263 seconds. Bourdais finished with the second-fastest time with Alex Tagliani in third. Junqueira and Manning were fourth and fifth, their best times two thousandths of a second apart. Two red flags came out during the session: the first was for Tracy who spun exiting Druids hairpin, removing the front wing of his car in a collision with a tyre barrier, the second when Tagliani spun at the pit lane entrance midway through practice.

The two 60-minute qualifying sessions took place on Saturday and Sunday afternoon with one driver allowed on the track at any time. The Saturday qualifying order would be set in reverse of the day's earlier practice sessions with Sunday's running order based on Saturday qualifying results. Each driver was allowed a total of six laps, four of which were timed, and the starting order was determined by their fastest lap times. The fastest drivers of both sessions received one championship point, and were guaranteed to start on the grid's front row for Monday's race. This was the first time this format was used on a road course in CART after drivers voiced concerns over their ability to achieve a lap time without encountering traffic. The first qualifying session had track temperatures lower than observed in the morning and drivers could not get the optimum tyre temperature. This meant they could only go faster on their final attempts.

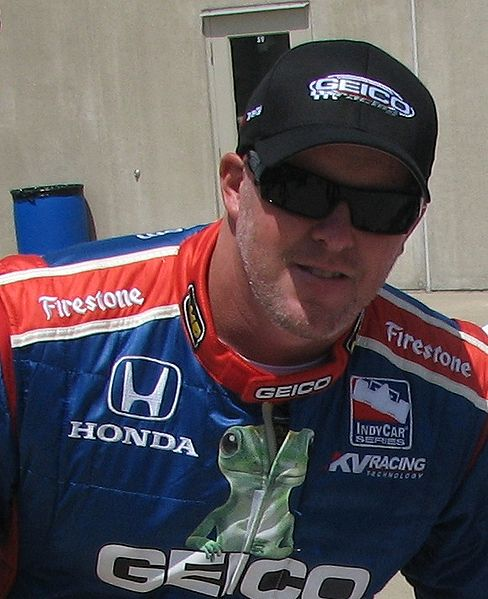
Paul Tracy (pictured in 2009) took his first pole position for three years with a new track record of the Brands Hatch Indy Circuit.

Tracy took provisional pole by recording the only lap close to 36 seconds with a new track record of 37.006 seconds on his last attempt, 0.016 seconds ahead of Junqueira who led until Tracy's time. Junquiera's performance was compromised as he had an altered car with better straightline speed but was slower in the corners. Bourdais ended the session third with Oriol Servià fourth and Manning fifth. Following him were the Canadian duo of Patrick Carpentier in sixth and Tagliani seventh. Fernández switched to a back-up car for the rest of the race meeting. His team altered its setup, but he used too much kerb at Clearways corner and was left eighth. Two other Mexican drivers, Jourdain and Mario Domínguez, were ninth and tenth. Vasser in 11th was followed by Monteiro and Mário Haberfeld. Alex Yoong recovered from gear linkage issues from practice, but an error at Druids hairpin left him 14th. Patrick Lemarié, Rodolfo Lavín, Joël Camathias and Roberto Moreno were in the next four provisional positions. Ryan Hunter-Reay did not set a lap after spinning on the front straight before starting his first timed lap. He was sent to the rear of the qualifying line and could not manage a second run. Monteiro and Camathias made two outings because of a miscommunication between their respective teams and completed three timed laps on the first runs. Both drivers were allowed back on the track later in the session and warmed up their tyres to gain the optimum running temperature. Monteiro and Camathias ran four out-laps before their final attempt.

In the third practice session, Fernández was quickest early on until Bourdais suprassed him. Tracy then took over the top spot, but Bourdais responded with a last minute lap of 37.379 seconds. Tracy was 0.120 seconds slower in second. Fernández and Servià were third and fourth and Junqueira fifth. Several incidents took place during the session. Lavin lost control under braking for Druids hairpin and was beached in the turn's gravel trap causing the session's first stoppage; he was imposed an eight-minute penalty. Yoong locked his brakes and struck the left-hand side tyre barrier at Druids hairpin, necessitating a second red flag. Camathias prompted the final stoppage after he spun at Clark Curve, which ended the session with two minutes left.

"I'm really happy to get the pole because it's been a long time since I had a pole. It's a relief. I think the last pole I had was at the Michigan oval in 2000 and I can't even remember the last time I had a road course pole. I've been stuck on 13 poles for a long time so it's great to finally get off that number."

— Paul Tracy, on taking his first pole position in CART for three years.

The weather was hot and sunny with a slight breeze, and it was expected that lap times would improve, since teams were more knowledgeable of the track conditions and more rubber had been laid on the racing line. Bourdais looked set to challenge Tracy, but he ran wide leaving Paddock Hill bend on his last qualifying lap and put the left-hand side of his car into the gravel, creating enough decompression to pull his hand off his steering wheel. When Tracy learned of this, he went slower and used scrubbed tyres to save an additional set for the race. Tracy thus took the 14th pole position of his career, his first since the 2000 Michigan 500, and his first on a road course since the 1994 Grand Prix of Monterey. Third-placed Junqueira altered his car, but the changes created excess understeer he and could not push hard. Servia remained in fourth position while Tagliani made downforce changes to his back-up car and moved from seventh to fifth. Fernández was another driver to move up two positions from his Saturday qualifying result and started sixth. He was followed by fellow Mexican Domínguez in seventh. Manning elected to push harder than any other driver but was unable to better his time and fell to eighth. Carpentier and Jourdain were ninth and tenth. Haberfeld gained two places from first qualifying to begin eleventh. Moreno was the biggest mover as he gained six places to 12th while Yoong took 13th. Following him was Vasser, Monteiro, Hunter-Reay, Lemarié and Camathias. Lavín was slowest overall and was on a faster lap when he made a minor driving error going into Clark Curve and lost around three-tenths of a second.

=== Qualifying classification ===
Qualifying results
| Pos | No. | Driver | Team | Q1 Time | Q2 Time | Best | Gap |
|---|---|---|---|---|---|---|---|
| 1 | 3 | Paul Tracy (CAN) | Forsythe Racing | 37.006 | 43.133 | 37.006 | — |
| 2 | 2 | Sébastien Bourdais (FRA) | Newman/Haas Racing | 37.112 | 37.044 | 37.044 | +0.038 |
| 3 | 1 | Bruno Junqueira (BRA) | Newman/Haas Racing | 37.022 | 37.225 | 37.022 | +0.016 |
| 4 | 20 | Oriol Servià (ESP) | Patrick Racing | 37.254 | 37.442 | 37.254 | +0.248 |
| 5 | 33 | Alex Tagliani (CAN) | Rocketsports Racing | 37.790 | 37.422 | 37.422 | +0.416 |
| 6 | 51 | Adrián Fernández (MEX) | Fernández Racing | 37.871 | 37.468 | 37.468 | +0.462 |
| 7 | 55 | Mario Domínguez (MEX) | Herdez Competition | 37.978 | 37.544 | 37.544 | +0.538 |
| 8 | 15 | Darren Manning (UK) | Walker Racing | 37.565 | 37.596 | 37.565 | +0.559 |
| 9 | 32 | Patrick Carpentier (CAN) | Forsythe Racing | 37.580 | 37.735 | 37.580 | +0.574 |
| 10 | 9 | Michel Jourdain Jr. (MEX) | Team Rahal | 37.928 | 37.705 | 37.705 | +0.699 |
| 11 | 34 | Mário Haberfeld (BRA) | Mi-Jack Conquest Racing | 38.199 | 37.719 | 37.719 | +0.713 |
| 12 | 4 | Roberto Moreno (BRA) | Herdez Competition | 40.726 | 37.730 | 37.730 | +0.724 |
| 13 | 11 | Alex Yoong (MYS) | Dale Coyne Racing | 38.233 | 37.865 | 37.865 | +0.859 |
| 14 | 12 | Jimmy Vasser (USA) | American Spirit Team Johansson | 37.982 | 38.472 | 37.982 | +0.976 |
| 15 | 7 | Tiago Monteiro (PRT) | Fittipaldi-Dingman Racing | 38.073 | 38.174 | 38.073 | +1.067 |
| 16 | 31 | Ryan Hunter-Reay (USA) | American Spirit Team Johansson | — | 38.115 | 38.115 | +1.109 |
| 17 | 27 | Patrick Lemarié (FRA) | PK Racing | 38.497 | 38.286 | 38.286 | +1.280 |
| 18 | 19 | Joël Camathias (SUI) | Dale Coyne Racing | 39.212 | 38.290 | 38.290 | +1.284 |
| 19 | 5 | Rodolfo Lavín (MEX) | Walker Racing | 38.803 | 38.423 | 38.423 | +1.417 |

== Warm-up ==
The drivers took to the track at 10:00 British Summer Time (BST) (UTC+1) for a 30-minute warm-up session. Weather conditions were overcast, and a slight wind could be felt. Drivers used the session to practice pit stops and scrub their tyres. Carpentier was running faster than in the previous two days and lapped fastest at 37.885 seconds. Bourdais continued his strong form by going second-fastest, and Hunter-Reay was third. Lemarié drifted wide onto the left-hand grass between the McLaren and Clearways corners. Camathias caused the session's sole stoppage by going straight into a gravel trap at Druids hairpin after locking his brakes. He required extraction by marshals to enable his return to the pit lane.

== Race ==
The race started before just under 40,000 spectators at 14:00 BST on 5 May. Close to the start, weather conditions were partly cloudy with the air temperature ranging between 63 and 65 °F (17 and 18 °C). Drivers were required to make two pit stops during green flag running and could make pit stops for fuel under caution. Former racing drivers Damon Hill, Emerson Fittipaldi and Mario Andretti commanded the drivers to start their engines. The first caution was triggered on the first lap when the drivers in the first two rows of the grid were not alongside each other. Competitive racing began at the start of lap two, and Tracy maintained his pole position advantage heading into the first corner. Farther back, Fernández collided with Tagliani and drifted wide to the left side of the track but managed to continue. Vasser drove into the pit lane and got out of his car to retire with left-front suspension damage caused by his front tyre turning in. Tracy began to pull away from the rest of the field, extending his lead to 2.08 seconds over Bourdais by the start of the 11th lap. Junqueira maintained third position, followed by Tagliani in fourth and Servià in fifth. Four laps later, Carpentier slowed momentarily and was overtaken by Fernández on the backstraight for eighth place.

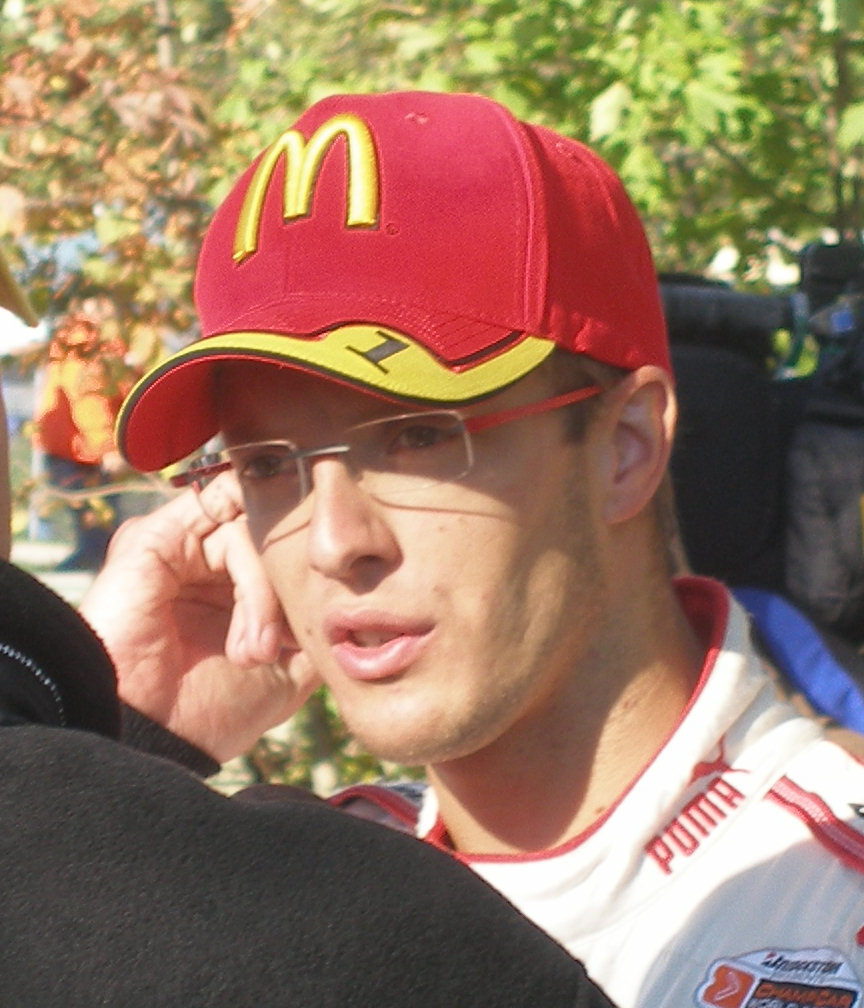
Sébastien Bourdais (pictured in 2007) got ahead of Tracy during the first round of pit stops and led a race-high 95 laps to claim his first CART victory.

At the front of the field, Bourdais and Junqueira began catching Tracy. Junqueira lowered Tracy's lead to 1.4 seconds as the race's fastest lap at the time was set by Carpentier who completed a circuit in 38.515 seconds on his 18th lap. The first round of green flag pit stops began on lap 49 when Tagliani, Monteiro and Lavín entered the pit lane for fuel and tyres. During this period, Manning ran off the circuit and into a gravel trap at Paddock Hill bend. Haberfeld, caught out by his cold tyres, went wide into some grass at Graham Hill bend. Tracy ran more downforce than his nearest rivals and used more fuel as a consequence. He was delayed by the slower Lavín losing two seconds before he made his pit stop on the 55th lap. Bourdais spent one extra lap on the track with a low amount of fuel when he entered pit lane on the following lap. The additional time Bourdais spent on the circuit, and his teammate Tracy being delayed, enabled him to assume the lead with a seven-tenths of a second advantage over Tracy after all pit stops had been completed. Bourdais and Tracy ran within about a half second of each other during the following 24 laps before a second caution was necessitated for an accident on lap 80.

Yoong was behind Moreno in 11th, and in front of Jourdain in 12th, when he locked his brakes into Druids corner and drifted wide onto the dirty side of the track. He then ran into the left-hand side tyre barrier at the turn becoming the second retirement of the race. During the caution, Manning and Tagliani, made pit stops for fuel because they wanted to push harder than the rest of the field. Doing this, however, required them to make an additional pit stop due to the mandatory two pit stop regulation enacted by CART. The safety car was withdrawn at the conclusion of lap 85 and racing resumed. Bourdais led and was followed by Tracy in second as the entire field went through Paddock Hill bend without incident. Bourdais and Tracy exchanged the race's fastest lap as the margin between the two drivers was consistently a second. Junqueira was a further five seconds adrift in third while Domínguez moved ahead of Servià and into fourth. On lap 107, Lemarié and Hunter-Reay began the second phase of green flag pit stops by entering the pit lane. A light spray of fluid was observed at the rear of Tracy's car as he made his pit stop on the 112th lap. Bourdais made his second pit stop five laps later and Tagliani led the field for the next 16 laps.

In the meantime on lap 118, Tracy's car caught fire at the rear because his gearbox failed after he crossed the start/finish line. He pulled over to the right-hand side of the track at Druids corner to become the event's last retirement. On lap 132, Fernández and Hunter-Reay made contact, and debris was left just off the racing line. Fernández shattered his front wing while Hunter-Reay picked up a rear-right puncture. Tagliani made his final pit stop on the following lap, handing the lead back to Bourdais. Unhindered in the final 33 laps, Bourdais maintained his lead while scything his way through slower traffic on the track's tight confines to claim his first CART victory. Junqueira followed 7.835 seconds later in second, and Domínguez completed the podium in third. Off the podium, Servià finished fourth and Carpentier took fifth. Rounding out the top ten were Jourdain, Moreno, Tagliani, Haberfeld and Manning. The final finishers were Lemarié, Fernández, Camathias, Monteiro, Lavín and Hunter-Reay. There were two cautions and three lead changes amongst three different drivers during the course of the race. Bourdais led twice for a total of 95 laps, more than any other driver.

=== Post-race ===
The top three drivers appeared on the podium to collect their trophies and spoke to the media at a later press conference. Bourdais said of his maiden success in the series, "We made it. It was difficult but we made it. We would probably have been the winner in two races already. It's been frustrating after the first events. The worm turned. Paul had trouble today and we got a bit lucky." He added that the victory satisfied him and his team after as be believed he could have won races earlier in the season. Second-placed Junqueira was pleased with advancing his position in the points' standings and had hoped the pit stop phase would fall in his favour during the race, saying, "I am closer now but I know that if I want to win the championship I am going to have to pull a few wins out of the bag." Domínguez said that his team worked hard to produce his third-place result and spoke of his feeling that his performance at Brands Hatch was better than winning the 2002 Honda Indy 300. He revealed that he acquainted himself with the circuit's optimum line by trailing Manning during Saturday's free practice sessions, "He's got lots of little tricks. The guy's who've been here before, they know their way around. Even though it's a small track, it has a very particular driving style."

Tracy's retirement from a broken gearbox was his first of the season. He commented on the championship situation, "It's never good to give away points like this. Now we don't have a cushion. This DNF is very costly. It's disappointing to have a failure like that. We would have been content to finish on the podium, but the engine let go on us." Tracy said his gearbox shifted by itself three to four laps and heard noises and spoke emitting from his car before his retirement, "When I was rolling down the hill, I had no gearbox. Otherwise, the car was running good." Manning said a poor fuel mileage led to him making three pit stops during the race. He admitted that his team compromised the racing set-up for the season's European leg and that he lost six seconds of time behind Monteiro and a group of slower cars, "We were running a weird kind of set-up for this track, which is not really an oval, but we always knew we would be compromised round here. We're also giving something away to the Lola chassis at the moment, but having said that, we expect to go better in Germany."

Media reaction to the race was largely negative. Derick Allsop of The Independent argued that the Brands Hatch Indy Circuit was too restrictive for Champ Cars with overtaking "virtually impossible", "A crowd of nearly 40,000 witnessed Cart's latest attempt to find a home in this country and could be forgiven for wondering why the series still claims to represent racing at its most thrilling. For two hours they watched the cars circulating the 1.2-mile Indy track, nestling in the natural amphitheatre here, and waited in vain for the much-vaunted spectacle to materialise." The Guardian's Richard Polkey wrote the spectators were "entitled to feel let down" after fuel economy created a processional event, "It was hardly the way to help spread the gospel of Cart – Championship Auto Racing Teams – around the globe, which was the reason they were here – and at Rockingham in the past two years". The correspondent for The Times said, "It was never the pulsating spectacle the pre-race propaganda had promised", and argued that the Grand Prix layout would have provided better racing to sustain public interest.

The result kept Tracy in the Drivers' Championship led with 65 points but his lead over Junqueira was reduced to 11 points. With 42 points, Jourdain kept third place as Fernández maintained fourth position with 29 points. Carpentier was fifth with 28 points. In the Manufacturers' Championship, Lola further extended their lead over Reynard to 54 points with 14 races left in the season.

=== Race classification ===
Race results
| Pos | No | Driver | Team | Laps | Time/Retired | Grid | Points |
|---|---|---|---|---|---|---|---|
| 1 | 2 | Sébastien Bourdais (FRA) | Newman/Haas Racing | 165 | 1:51:56.987 | 2 | 22 |
| 2 | 1 | Bruno Junqueira (BRA) | Newman/Haas Racing | 165 | +7.835 | 3 | 16 |
| 3 | 55 | Mario Domínguez (MEX) | Herdez Competition | 165 | +11.524 | 7 | 14 |
| 4 | 20 | Oriol Servià (ESP) | Patrick Racing | 165 | +14.385 | 4 | 12 |
| 5 | 32 | Patrick Carpentier (CAN) | Forsythe Racing | 165 | +15.035 | 9 | 10 |
| 6 | 9 | Michel Jourdain Jr. (MEX) | Team Rahal | 165 | +30.703 | 10 | 8 |
| 7 | 4 | Roberto Moreno (BRA) | Herdez Competition | 165 | +36.997 | 12 | 6 |
| 8 | 33 | Alex Tagliani (CAN) | Rocketsports Racing | 165 | +38.762 | 5 | 5 |
| 9 | 34 | Mário Haberfeld (BRA) | Mi-Jack Conquest Racing | 164 | +1 Lap | 11 | 4 |
| 10 | 15 | Darren Manning (UK) | Walker Racing | 164 | +1 Lap | 8 | 3 |
| 11 | 27 | Patrick Lemarié (FRA) | PK Racing | 163 | +2 Laps | 17 | 2 |
| 12 | 51 | Adrián Fernández (MEX) | Fernández Racing | 163 | +2 Laps | 6 | 1 |
| 13 | 19 | Joël Camathias (SUI) | Dale Coyne Racing | 163 | +2 Laps | 18 | 0 |
| 14 | 7 | Tiago Monteiro (PRT) | Fittipaldi-Dingman Racing | 163 | +2 Laps | 15 | 0 |
| 15 | 5 | Rodolfo Lavín (MEX) | Walker Racing | 162 | +3 Laps | 19 | 0 |
| 16 | 31 | Ryan Hunter-Reay (USA) | American Spirit Team Johansson | 162 | +3 Laps | 16 | 0 |
| 17 | 3 | Paul Tracy (CAN) | Forsythe Racing | 118 | Mechanical | 1 | 1 |
| 18 | 11 | Alex Yoong (MYS) | Dale Coyne Racing | 78 | Contact | 13 | 0 |
| 19 | 12 | Jimmy Vasser (USA) | American Spirit Team Johansson | 1 | Mechanical | 14 | 0 |

== Standings after the race ==
Drivers' Championship standings
| Rank | +/– | Driver | Points |
|---|---|---|---|
| 1 | | Paul Tracy (CAN) | 65 |
| 2 | | Bruno Junqueira (BRA) | 54 (−11) |
| 3 | | Michel Jourdain Jr. (MEX) | 42 (−23) |
| 4 | | Adrián Fernández (MEX) | 29 (−36) |
| 5 | 2 | Patrick Carpentier (CAN) | 28 (−37) |

Constructors' standings
| Rank | +/– | Constructor | Points |
|---|---|---|---|
| 1 | | Lola (UK) | 88 |
| 2 | | Reynard (UK) | 34 (−54) |
Sources:

- Note: Only the top five positions are included for the drivers' standings.

| Previous race: 2003 Toyota Grand Prix of Long Beach | Champ Car World Series; 2003 season | Next race: 2003 German 500 |
| Previous race: 1978 Brands Hatch Indy Trophy | 2003 London Champ Car Trophy | Next race: Not Held |
