= 2003 German 500 =

Open-wheel race held in Klettwitz, Germany

(Germany) 2003 German 500
Race details
Race 5 of 18 in the 2003 CART season
← Previous race	Next race →
- Layout of EuroSpeedway Lausitz
- Date: May 11, 2003
- Official name: German 500
- Location: EuroSpeedway Lausitz; Klettwitz, Brandenburg, Germany
- Course: Permanent racing circuit 2.023 mi / 3.256 km
- Distance: 154 laps 311.542 mi / 501.378 km
- Weather: Mostly cloudy

Pole position
- Driver: (France) Sébastien Bourdais (Newman/Haas Racing)
- Time: 37.000

Fastest lap
- Driver: (Mexico) Michel Jourdain Jr. (Team Rahal)
- Time: 36.721 (on lap 133 of 154)

Podium
- First: (France) Sébastien Bourdais (Newman/Haas Racing)
- Second: (Mexico) Mario Domínguez (Herdez Competition)
- Third: (Mexico) Michel Jourdain Jr. (Team Rahal)

The 2003 German 500 was a Championship Auto Racing Teams (CART) open-wheel race that was held on May 11, 2003 at EuroSpeedway Lausitz in Klettwitz, Brandenburg, Germany. It was the fifth round of the 2003 Champ Car World Series and the second and final running of the event. The 154-lap race was won by Newman/Haas Racing driver Sébastien Bourdais. Mario Domínguez of Herdez Competition finished second and Team Rahal's Michel Jourdain Jr. came in third.

Bourdais set the fastest time of qualifying and won the pole position. Prior to the race, Alex Zanardi drove 13 laps around the circuit in honor of the laps he never completed in the 2001 American Memorial due to his near-fatal crash. Bourdais and his teammate Bruno Junqueira traded the lead several times before Domínguez passed them both on lap 35. Domínguez's blocking tactics against Bourdais were deemed too aggressive by CART and he was issued a penalty, allowing Bourdais and Junqueira to continue their battle for the lead. After the final round of pit stops, Bourdais reclaimed the lead, but received immense pressure from Domínguez's multiple attempts to pass him. Bourdais ultimately fended off Domínguez and earned his second CART victory.

With Paul Tracy struggling to materialize a fast pace due to an overabundance of downforce on his car, he was left tied with Junqueira for the lead in the Drivers' Championship. Bourdais' win boosted him from sixth to fourth place in the standings. Lola widened their lead over Reynard in the Constructors' Championship with 13 races left in the season.

== Background ==
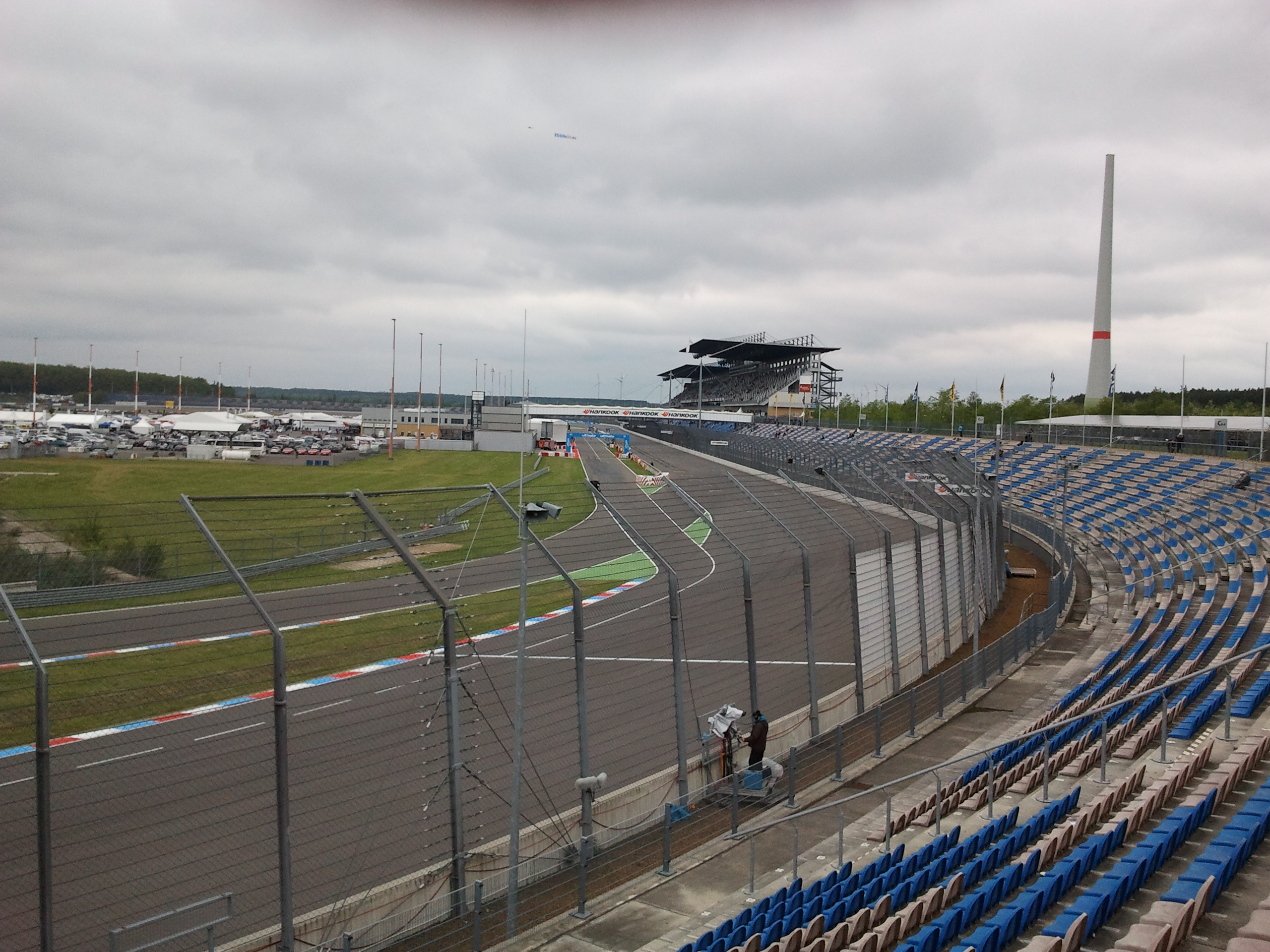
The EuroSpeedway Lausitz (pictured in 2012), where the race was held.

The German 500 was the fifth of 18 scheduled open-wheel races for the 2003 Champ Car World Series, the second edition of the event, and the second and last race in Championship Auto Racing Teams (CART)'s European swing; the London Champ Car Trophy was held at Brands Hatch in England the week prior. It was held on May 11, 2003 at EuroSpeedway Lausitz, a three-turn 2.023 mi (3.256 km) superspeedway, in Klettwitz, Brandenburg, Germany, and was contested over 154 laps and 311.542 miles (501.378 km). The FIA Sportscars and German Formula Three Championship held support races that same weekend. Heading into the race, Paul Tracy held the lead in the Drivers' Championship with 65 points, eleven more than Bruno Junqueira in second. Michel Jourdain Jr. held third on 42 points, ahead of fourth-placed Adrián Fernández with 29 and fifth-placed Patrick Carpentier with 28. In the Constructors' Cup standings, Lola led with 88 points, while Reynard stood second on 34.

CART's last race at Lausitz, held four days after the September 11 attacks in 2001, was overshadowed by a severe crash which left Alex Zanardi losing both legs. One month after track promoters filed for insolvency, the event was dropped from the series' schedule in 2002, despite CART's expectations that the race would be held as scheduled. The race was again omitted from the schedule in 2003, although an event in Europe was tentatively listed. On January 10, 2003, CART president and chief executive officer (CEO) Chris Pook and track CEO Hans-Jörg Fischer announced the series' return to Lausitz; additionally, all tickets sold to the cancelled 2002 event would be honored for the 2003 event. CART required each team not to change their aerodynamic configuration from the previous round at Brands Hatch. The road course aero package was expected to decrease speeds below 200 mph (320 km/h) and create close pack racing.

Sébastien Bourdais, the winner of the preceding London Champ Car Trophy, expressed anticipation for the German 500 and admitted that he underestimated the skills necessary to compete on an oval track until he completed a preseason test at Phoenix International Raceway. Championship leader Tracy acknowledged the adversity of altering the racing setup from that of a road course like Brands Hatch to a superspeedway like Lausitz, but assured that he would finish well in the race. Junqueira conversely believed that Forsythe Racing's overuse of downforce may place Tracy and Carpentier at a disadvantage compared to other teams. Jourdain Jr. was confident that he could perform well at Lausitz due to Team Rahal's success on superspeedways over the past five years, including a win at the track with Kenny Bräck in 2001.

== Practice and qualifying ==
One 160-minute practice session on Saturday morning preceded the race on Sunday. The first 25 minutes were exclusively reserved for the nine rookie drivers, while the last 135 minutes were open to all competitors. Bourdais set the quickest time of the session at 36.794 seconds, almost a tenth of a second quicker than Newman/Haas Racing teammate Junqueira in second. Mario Domínguez, Alex Tagliani, and Jourdain Jr. rounded out the top-five. The session featured several stoppages for Darren Manning, Rodolfo Lavín, and Tagliani, all of whom slowed to a halt on the track. Debris from Tracy and Oriol Servià's cars also paused the session.

It’s great to win the pole on my first trip to an oval. It was not really my job -- the engineers did a wonderful job to make the car where I could run flat out. I think we have had a strong car since the beginning of the season. We were quick at Brands Hatch so I didn’t think we prepared the cars enough for this event since we had to make a compromise and have one set-up that would work on the road course and the oval. It was fairly easy to stay flat all the way around. We definitely have a good chance to be on pace at all of the races.

— Sébastien Bourdais, following the qualifying session.

During the qualifying session on Saturday afternoon, the slowest driver of the practice session went out on track first, while the quickest driver went last. Each driver was allowed to complete up to four warm-up laps before running two timed laps, with the fastest of the two determining their starting position. The session was held under cloudy and lukewarm conditions. Bourdais earned the third pole position of his career with a time of 37.000 seconds. He was joined on the grid's front row by Junqueira, who clinched his best qualifying performance of the season thus far, but was displeased that his lap was two tenths of a second slower than Bourdais'. With Bourdais starting first and Junqueira second, Newman/Haas Racing earned their first one-two qualifying effort since the 1995 Toyota Grand Prix of Long Beach.

Jourdain Jr. qualified third; however, CART officials noted a modification to his car's air inlet in post-qualifying technical inspection. Because this was a violation of CART's rules, Jourdain Jr. was required to start at the back of the grid and Team Rahal was fined $10,000. The team immediately filed a protest and the series judges ruled in favor of them, meaning that all penalties were revoked and Jourdain Jr. kept the third starting position. Mário Haberfeld and Manning took the remaining positions in the top five, and Domínguez, Servià, Lavín, Tagliani, and Patrick Lemarié took positions sixth through tenth. Many drivers who qualified outside the top ten complained of an excessive amount of drag which hampered their cars. Jimmy Vasser took 11th, ahead of Roberto Moreno in 12th, Alex Yoong in 13th, Tiago Monteiro in 14th, and Ryan Hunter-Reay in 15th. Forsythe Racing teammates Tracy and Carpentier expectedly struggled in qualifying and started 16th and 17th, with Joël Camathias and Fernández taking the last two spots on the grid in 18th and 19th, respectively.

=== Qualifying classification ===
Final qualifying results
Pos	No.	Driver	Team	Time	Speed	Grid
1	2	(France) Sébastien Bourdais	Newman/Haas Racing	37.000	196.832	1
2	1	(Brazil) Bruno Junqueira	Newman/Haas Racing	37.211	195.716	2
3	9	(Mexico) Michel Jourdain Jr.	Team Rahal	37.274	195.386	3
4	34	(Brazil) Mario Haberfeld	Conquest Racing	37.392	194.769	4
5	15	(United Kingdom) Darren Manning	Walker Racing	37.532	194.042	5
6	55	(Mexico) Mario Domínguez	Herdez Competition	37.690	193.229	6
7	20	(Spain) Oriol Servià	Patrick Racing	37.702	193.167	7
8	5	(Mexico) Rodolfo Lavín	Walker Racing	37.717	193.091	8
9	33	(Canada) Alex Tagliani	Rocketsports Racing	37.732	193.014	9
10	27	(France) Patrick Lemarié	PK Racing	37.806	192.636	10
11	12	(United States) Jimmy Vasser	American Spirit Team Johansson	37.911	192.103	11
12	4	(Brazil) Roberto Moreno	Herdez Competition	38.057	191.366	12
13	11	(Malaysia) Alex Yoong	Dale Coyne Racing	38.152	190.889	13
14	7	(Portugal) Tiago Monteiro	Fittipaldi-Dingman Racing	38.196	190.669	14
15	31	(United States) Ryan Hunter-Reay	American Spirit Team Johansson	38.220	190.549	15
16	3	(Canada) Paul Tracy	Forsythe Racing	38.244	190.430	16
17	32	(Canada) Patrick Carpentier	Forsythe Racing	38.286	190.221	17
18	19	(Switzerland) Joël Camathias	Dale Coyne Racing	38.558	188.879	18
19	51	(Mexico) Adrian Fernández	Fernández Racing	38.666	188.352	19

== Warm-up ==
The drivers took to the track on Sunday at 10:00 a.m. local time (UTC+01:00) for a 30-minute warm-up session under cloudy conditions. Servià set the fastest time of the session at 37.344 seconds, quicker than his qualifying lap. Jourdain Jr. was eight hundredths of a second slower than Servià in second, with Bourdais, Junqueira, and Yoong occupying the next three positions. Lavín and Junqueira both slowed on the circuit, bringing out two red flags in the session.

== Race ==
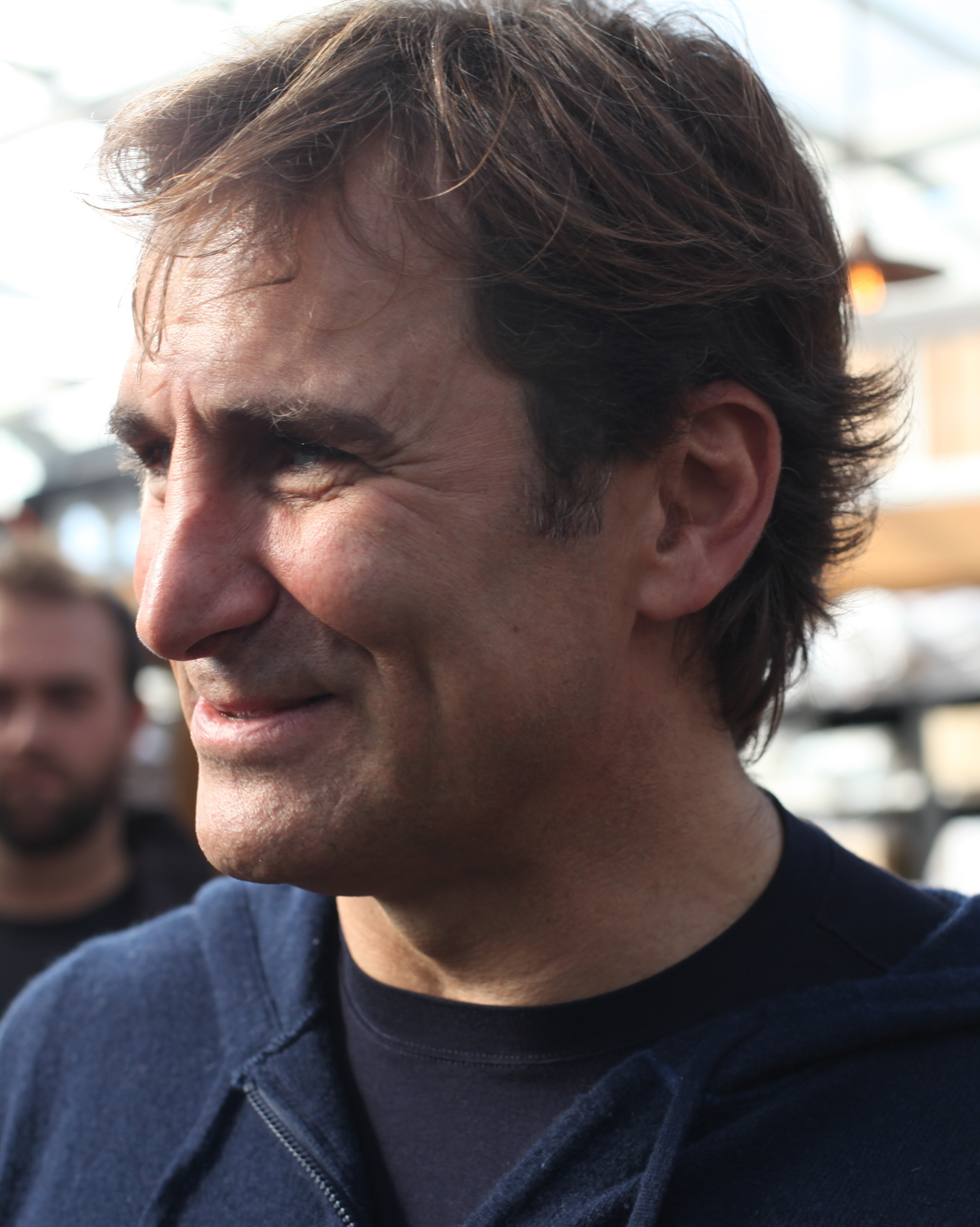
Alex Zanardi (pictured in 2011) completed 13 laps prior to the race to symbolize the laps he never finished in the 2001 American Memorial.

Pre-race festivities began with an emotional tone as Alex Zanardi completed 13 ceremonial laps around Lausitz, symbolizing the number of laps he failed to complete in the 2001 American Memorial due to his near-fatal crash. He had also ran 40 laps around the track on Friday evening to assess the car's speed. Zanardi drove a modified 2002 Reynard-built Ford-Cosworth car that was fitted with a hand-controlled accelerator and a boxed pedal assembly which allowed him to apply the brakes with his hip and thigh. The car featured the same livery that Zanardi sported in the 2001 season prior to his accident. Zanardi's 13th lap was his quickest, timing in at 37.487 seconds, which would have placed him fifth on the grid for the forthcoming race. He later stated that he was appreciative of the fans and drivers' support and revealed the creation of his Michigan-based charity, the Alex Zanardi Foundation.

Weather conditions remained hazy around the beginning of the race, although air temperatures improved to between 70 and 74 °F (21 and 23 °C) and track temperatures to between 85 and 103 °F (29 and 39 °C). Approximately 68,000 people attended the race. Zanardi commanded the drivers to start their engines and series starter J. D. Wilbur waved the green flag at 2:15 p.m. to start the race. Junqueira pulled ahead of pole sitter Bourdais in the second turn to take the lead. By the third lap, Tracy utilized the outside line to improve his position from 16th to 9th. Bourdais used the draft from Junqueira's car on the back stretch and reclaimed the lead on the fourth lap. Jourdain Jr. slowly reached Junqueira and attempted to pass him on lap 12, but failed and was passed by Domínguez for third place. Junqueira reclaimed the first position from Bourdais seven laps later. The first caution flag of the race was issued on lap 23 when debris was spotted on the second turn. All the leaders elected to make pit stops. As Jourdain Jr. exited his pit stall, he knocked Lavín into Lemarié, who resultantly slammed the inside wall and sustained damage to the right side of his suspension.

Junqueira led the field back up to speed at the restart on lap 28. Domínguez steered to Bourdais' left side and overtook him for second place. Behind the leaders, Tagliani became the race's second retiree that same lap due to a gearbox failure. Bourdais fell to fourth on the 33rd lap as he was passed by Servià in turn two, though Bourdais quickly reclaimed third. Two laps later, Domínguez charged past Junqueira to take the lead. Junqueira was passed by Bourdais and Servià on lap 38, dropping him to fourth place. Over the next 15 laps, Bourdais remained second, but engaged in an intense battle with Domínguez for the lead. On the 51st lap, Bourdais dove to the blend line in an attempt to overtake Domínguez, but quickly turned right and rejoined the track without losing a position. Domínguez led the field into pit road on lap 53 for the second round of pit stops as mandated by CART. He exited pit road first and retained the lead, but was warned by CART officials for blocking Bourdais. Jourdain Jr. was also assessed a 15-second penalty by CART for hitting Lavín and Lemarié on his previous stop.

Domínguez's 0.8-second lead on lap 56 had been reduced to less than a tenth of a second as Bourdais continued their battle for the first position. On the 75th lap, Domínguez nearly forced Bourdais into the inside wall on the front stretch. During the third cycle of pit stops on lap 81, Domínguez was mandated by officials to stay in his pit stall an additional five seconds for aggressive blocking; he rejoined the race in fifth place as Bourdais took the lead. The second caution flag was issued on the 83rd lap for debris, while Yoong retired from the race with mechanical issues. Most of the 16 remaining drivers elected not to make pit stops, with the exceptions of Carpentier, Vasser, Monteiro, and Haberfeld. Green-flag racing resumed on lap 89, and Junqueira promptly overtook Servià for second place. Monteiro made contact with the outside wall on lap 93 and continued without further incident. Junqueira drove alongside Bourdais to take the lead on the 99th lap; the two drivers remained side-by-side with each other, with Bourdais leading on lap 102 and Junqueira on lap 103. The battle concluded a lap later as Junqueira backed off the throttle and fell to fourth place, while Bourdais took the lead once again.

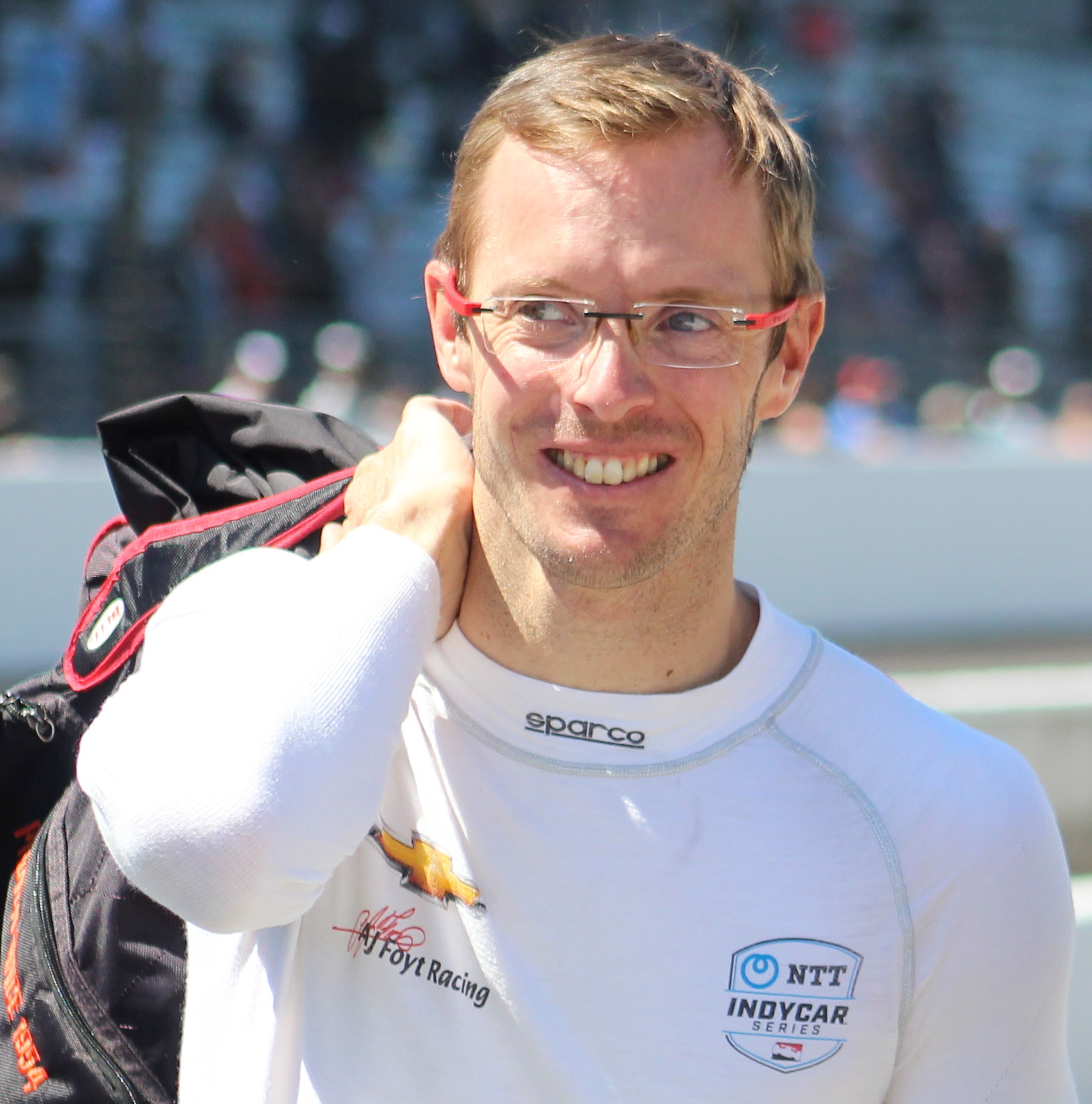
Sébastien Bourdais (pictured in 2021) held off Mario Domínguez to earn his second win in CART.

Bourdais led most of the field into pit road on lap 109, allowing Carpentier to assume the lead, and nearly spun into the grass after overapplying the brakes. Jourdain Jr. beat Bourdais out of pit road to take third place, but Bourdais reclaimed the position a lap later. He then took the lead as Vasser, who passed Carpentier on the 112th lap, made a pit stop with Carpentier and stalled. Eight laps later, Junqueira passed Servià on his inside for the fourth position. Domínguez got by Jourdain Jr. for second place on the 129th lap as they maneuvered around Tracy and Monteiro, both of whom had been lapped by this point. Bourdais conceded the lead to Carpentier on lap 138 to make his final pit stop of the race along with several of the leaders. Jourdain Jr. and Domínguez rejoined the track ahead of Bourdais, but by the 142nd lap, Bourdais passed them both to retake the lead as Carpentier made his final stop. Domínguez overtook Jourdain Jr. for second place and followed closely behind Bourdais. For the final six laps, Domínguez made several attempts to pass Bourdais on the outside line, but Bourdais successfully defended his position and earned the second CART victory of his career and the season. Domínguez finished second, 0.084 seconds behind Bourdais, while Jourdain Jr. completed the podium. Junqueira finished fourth after passing Servià on lap 153, with Manning, Carpentier, Vasser, Lavín, and Moreno rounding out the top-ten. The remaining classified finishers were Hunter-Reay, Tracy, Monteiro, Haberfeld, Fernández, and Camathias.

=== Post-race ===
Bourdais performed a burnout in front of the spectators before joining Domínguez and Jourdain Jr. in podium celebrations. In a post-race press conference, Bourdais regarded the racing as "fun" and stated: "When we arrived in traffic, the race started properly. I learned quite a lot racing with Mario. I wasn't quite fast enough to overtake when I was side-by-side. But in the last stint, I learned to get through traffic better and the inside line was better. It was a high-speed game but I think I did pretty well." Second-placed Domínguez thanked his team for providing quick pit stops, but opined that his penalty early in the race was unfair: "I'm just very disappointed with the people with CART and the officials because I got a penalty, and they say that I got a penalty for blocking. As far as I'm concerned, I didn't do anything wrong. Sébastien (Bourdais), when I was behind him, he was doing exactly the same thing I was doing, which is okay with me. But, you know, why should I get a penalty for something? I didn't do anything wrong." Jourdain Jr., who finished third, talked about his struggles throughout the race and acknowledged that "I just didn't have anything for (Bourdais and Domínguez), you know.”

Fourth-place finisher Junqueira was disappointed and felt his car wasn't fast enough to challenge Bourdais or Domínguez for the win: "Although there is a spec engine in the series, the power varies. Sébastien and Mario (Domínguez) had the power but not as much experience and it made a difference. [...] Newman/Haas (Racing) is one of the best teams in racing so I am sure we can improve on this.” Despite Servià's fifth-place finish, he was still underwhelmed because he believed his team could win: "The Visteon/Patrick Racing team had two good performances in Europe. We scored a lot of points and moved up several places in the championship standings. However, we are still not happy with our results. The Visteon/Patrick Racing team is capable of winning races and contending for the championship. We just have to keep working hard and improving." Tracy lamented his lackluster performance in the race, which, according to him, was caused by his aero package: "Team Player’s underestimated how the car was going to react on the German superspeedway. And I certainly didn’t expect the car would be this slow. We just weren’t competitive, and it’s hard to compete if your car isn’t on the same level as the others."

The final result left Tracy and Junqueira tied for the lead in the Drivers' Championship as both drivers earned 66 points. Third-placed Jourdain Jr. was ten points in arrears, while Fernández fell to seventh as Bourdais took fourth, Domínguez fifth, and Carpentier sixth. Lola continued to top the standings in the Constructors' Cup standings with 110 points, 68 more than Reynard, as 13 races remained in the season. This was the last CART race at EuroSpeedway Lausitz because the sanctioning body and its successor, Champ Car, could no longer afford to host races in Europe.

=== Race classification ===
Drivers who scored championship points are denoted in bold.

Final race results
Pos	No.	Driver	Team	Laps	Time/Retired	Grid	Points
1	2	**(France) Sébastien Bourdais**	**Newman/Haas Racing**	154	1:49:22.498	1	**22**^{1}^{2}
2	55	**(Mexico) Mario Domínguez**	**Herdez Competition**	154	+0.084	6	**16**
3	9	**(Mexico) Michel Jourdain Jr.**	**Team Rahal**	154	+0.245	3	**14**
4	1	**(Brazil) Bruno Junqueira**	**Newman/Haas Racing**	154	+12.042	2	**12**
5	20	**(Spain) Oriol Servià**	**Patrick Racing**	154	+12.055	7	**10**
6	15	**(United Kingdom) Darren Manning**	**Walker Racing**	154	+24.602	5	**8**
7	32	**(Canada) Patrick Carpentier**	**Forsythe Racing**	153	+1 lap	17	**6**
8	12	**(United States) Jimmy Vasser**	**American Spirit Team Johansson**	153	+1 lap	11	**5**
9	5	**(Mexico) Rodolfo Lavín**	**Walker Racing**	153	+1 lap	8	**4**
10	4	**(Brazil) Roberto Moreno**	**Herdez Competition**	153	+1 lap	12	**3**
11	31	**(United States) Ryan Hunter-Reay**	**American Spirit Team Johansson**	152	+2 laps	15	**2**
12	3	**(Canada) Paul Tracy**	**Forsythe Racing**	152	+2 laps	16	**1**
13	7	(Portugal) Tiago Monteiro	Fittipaldi-Dingman Racing	152	+2 laps	14	
14	34	(Brazil) Mario Haberfeld	Conquest Racing	152	+2 laps	4	
15	51	(Mexico) Adrian Fernández	Fernández Racing	152	+2 laps	19	
16	19	(Switzerland) Joël Camathias	Dale Coyne Racing	152	+2 laps	18	
17	11	(Malaysia) Alex Yoong	Dale Coyne Racing	81	Mechanical	13	
18	33	(Canada) Alex Tagliani	Rocketsports Racing	28	Mechanical	9	
19	27	(France) Patrick Lemarié	PK Racing	25	Contact	10	

Notes

- **^1** — Includes one bonus point for being the fastest qualifier.
- **^2** — Includes one bonus point for leading the most laps.

== Standings after the race ==
Drivers' Championship standings
	Pos.	Driver	Points
	1	(Canada) Paul Tracy	66
	2	(Brazil) Bruno Junqueira	66 (–0)
	3	(Mexico) Michel Jourdain Jr.	56 (–10)
2	4	(France) Sébastien Bourdais	49 (–17)
3	5	(Mexico) Mario Domínguez	40 (–26)

Constructors' Cup standings
Pos.	Constructor	Points
1	(United Kingdom) Lola	110
2	(United Kingdom) Reynard	42 (–68)

- Note: Only the top five positions are included for the Drivers' Championship standings.

Previous race: 2003 London Champ Car Trophy	Champ Car World Series; 2003 season	Next race: 2003 Milwaukee Mile Centennial 250
Previous race: 2001 American Memorial	German 500	Next race: —
