= Unfallkrankenhaus Berlin =

Specialised trauma hospital in Berlin, Germany

Unfallkrankenhaus Berlin (ukb)

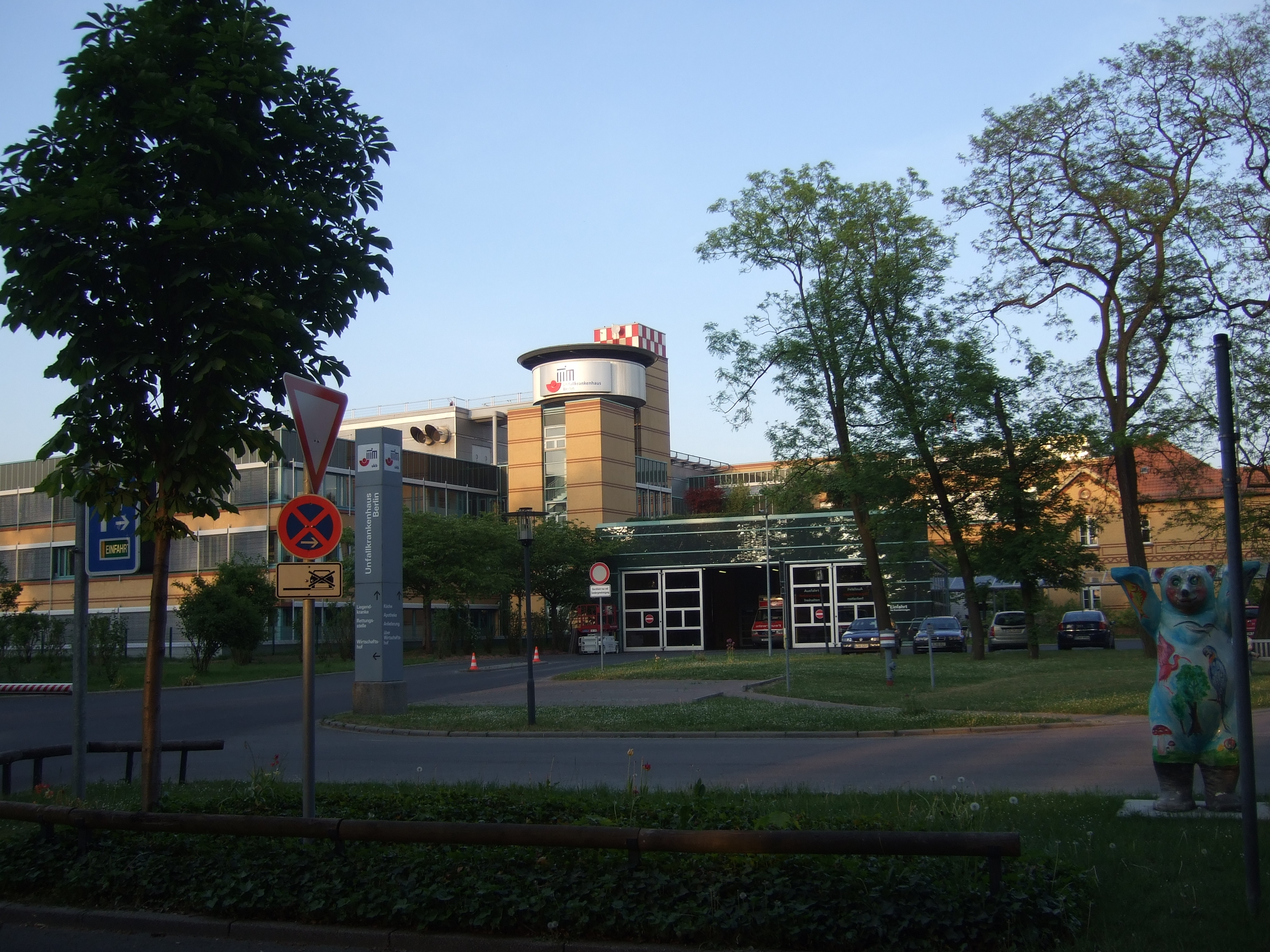
- The Unfallkrankenhaus Berlin (2008)

- Location in Berlin

Geography
- Location: Warener Straße 7, 12683 Berlin, Germany
- Coordinates: 52°31′08″N 13°33′57″E

Organisation
- Care system: Public / statutory accident insurance (BG Kliniken)
- Type: Trauma / specialist hospital
- Affiliated university: Charité – Universitätsmedizin Berlin

Services
- Emergency department: Yes (trauma / shock room)
- Beds: 588

Helipads
- Helipad: Yes (Christoph Berlin)

History
- Founded: 3 September 1997

Links
- Website: www.ukb.de

The Unfallkrankenhaus Berlin (ukb), Accident Hospital Berlin, is a specialised trauma, acute care, and rehabilitation hospital located in the Biesdorf–Marzahn-Hellersdorf district of Berlin, Germany. It is part of the BG Kliniken network (hospitals of the statutory accident insurance) and serves as one of the major trauma centers for Berlin and the surrounding region.

== History ==
=== Antecedent sites and legacy ===
The ukb campus includes many historic buildings that originally belonged to the Wilhelm-Griesinger Hospital (Wilhelm-Griesinger-Krankenhaus) in Biesdorf. The institution began as the Anstalt für Epileptische Wuhlgarten bei Biesdorf, officially opened on 18 November 1893, and over time the site was expanded through multiple construction phases. Architectural plans at the time included not only wards and residential houses for staff, but also a dedicated hospital chapel (Krankenhauskirche) and an institutional cemetery. The remodeled church on the grounds later adopted a basilica form and held around 500 seats.

The Unfallkrankenhaus Berlin itself was formally established in 1997, merging new infrastructure with the existing site. The official opening took place on 3 September 1997. Initially it was co-owned by the State of Berlin and the statutory accident insurers (Berufsgenossenschaften). On 1 July 2003 Berlin withdrew, leaving the insurers as sole sponsor. In 2016, ukb was integrated into the BG Kliniken GmbH group.

=== Expansion and new facilities ===
Between 2012 and 2016, the ukb underwent a major expansion, including a new clinic annex, a five-storey specialist outpatient center (Ärztehaus, the "Gesundheitszentrum am ukb"), and a multi-storey car park with around 243–246 spaces.

The Gesundheitszentrum am ukb (Medical center) opened in October 2014 and houses specialist practices, outpatient care, and allied services such as pharmacy and physiotherapy.

In 2021, the ukb inaugurated a new rehabilitation clinic with 151 beds for neurological rehabilitation, respiratory weaning, and sports medicine.

== Functions and services ==
The ukb is a maximum-level trauma center (German: Zentrum für Schwerverletzte) specialising in the rescue, acute treatment, and rehabilitation of severely injured patients. It is equipped for burn injuries, spinal cord injuries, hand surgery, reconstructive and neurosurgery, orthopaedics, and complex trauma.

The emergency department operates 24/7 with shock-room capacity and helipads for air rescue. The air rescue helicopter Christoph Berlin is stationed on the rooftop. On New Year’s Eve 2024/2025, the ukb reported treating 42 patients with severe firework injuries, many caused by so-called Kugelbomben (aerial shells), including cases of amputations and burns.

Each year, the ukb treats over 100,000 patients (inpatients and outpatients combined).

The ukb is an academic teaching hospital associated with the Charité – Universitätsmedizin Berlin.

== Transport ==
Public transport connections include bus lines 154 and X69 (stop "Rapsweg/Unfallkrankenhaus"), as well as the U-Bahn and S-Bahn station Wuhletal, about a ten-minute walk away.

== Gallery ==
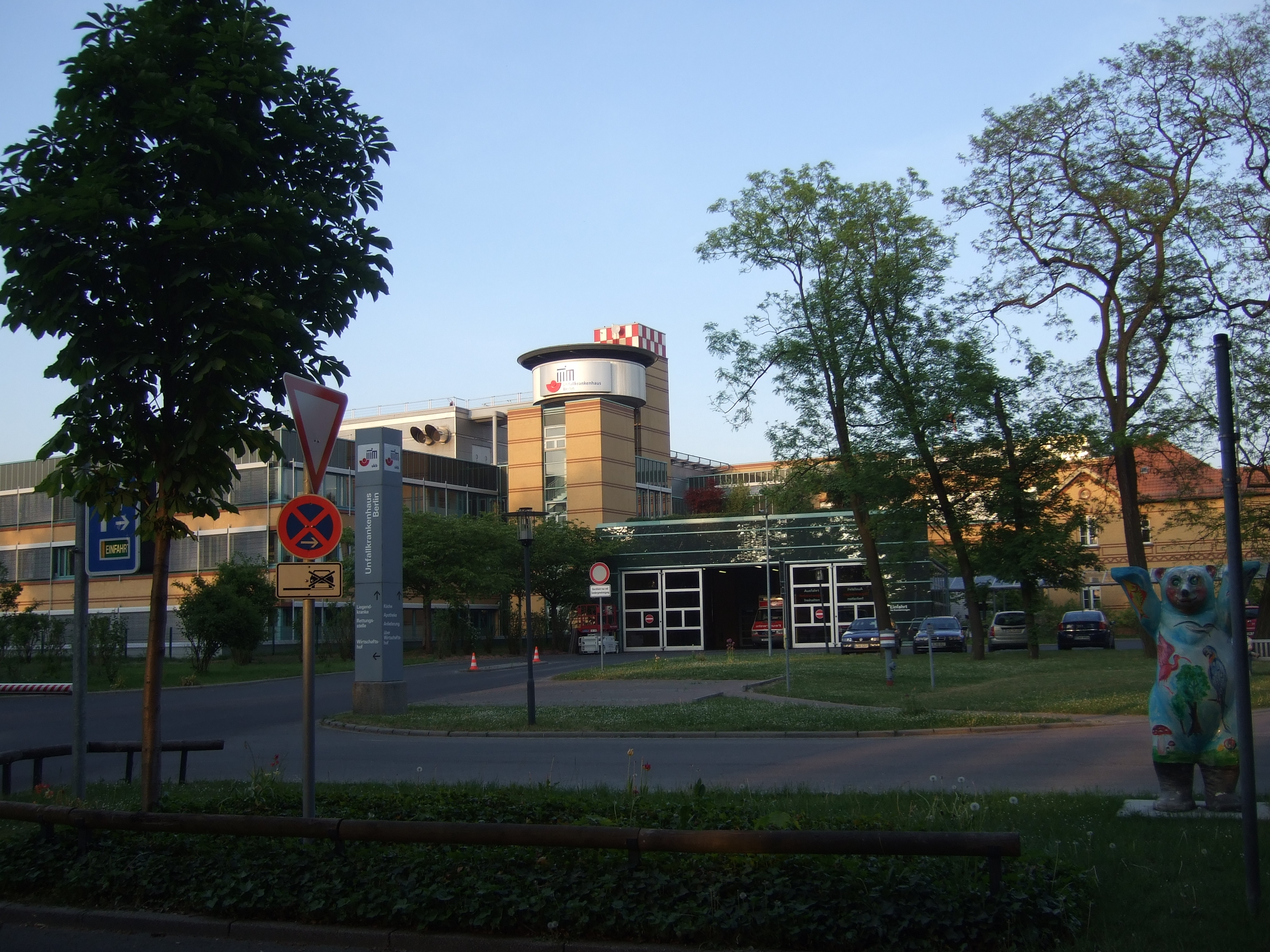
Main building (2008)

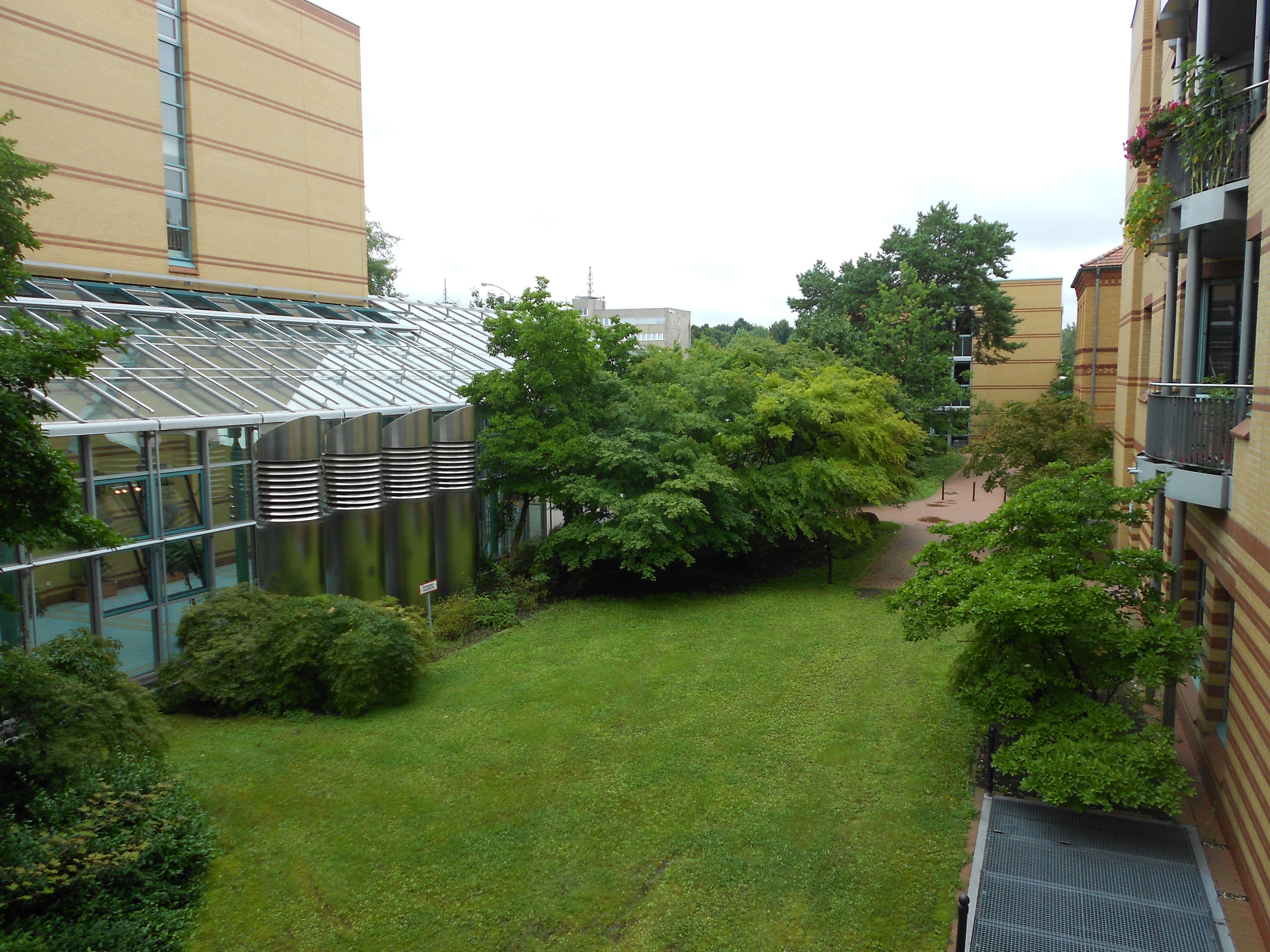
Clinic building (2012)

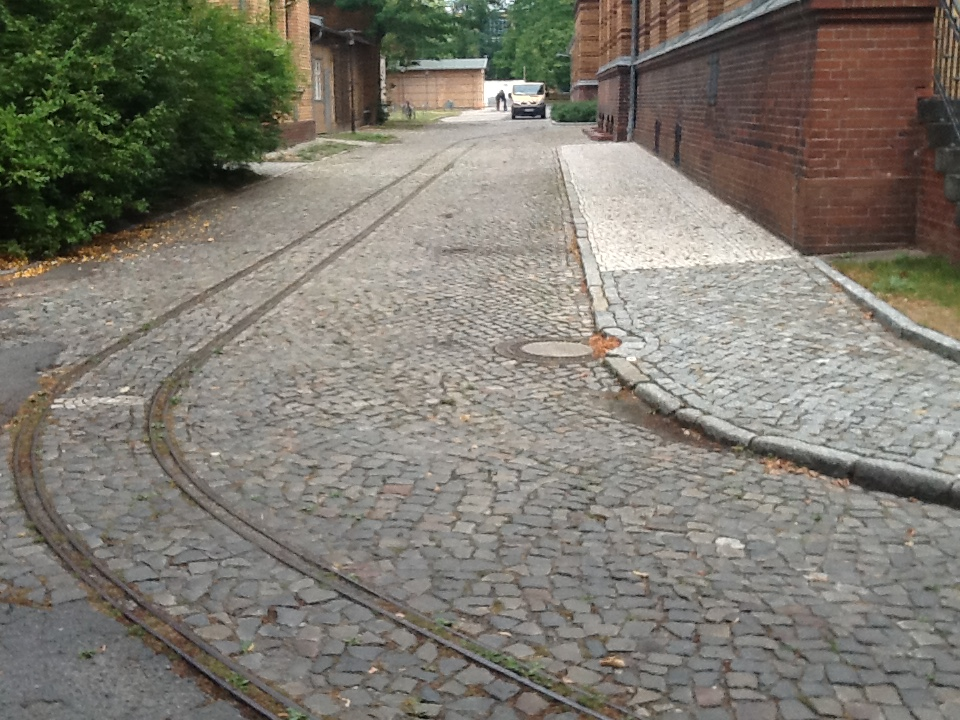
Hospital view from Warener Straße (2015)

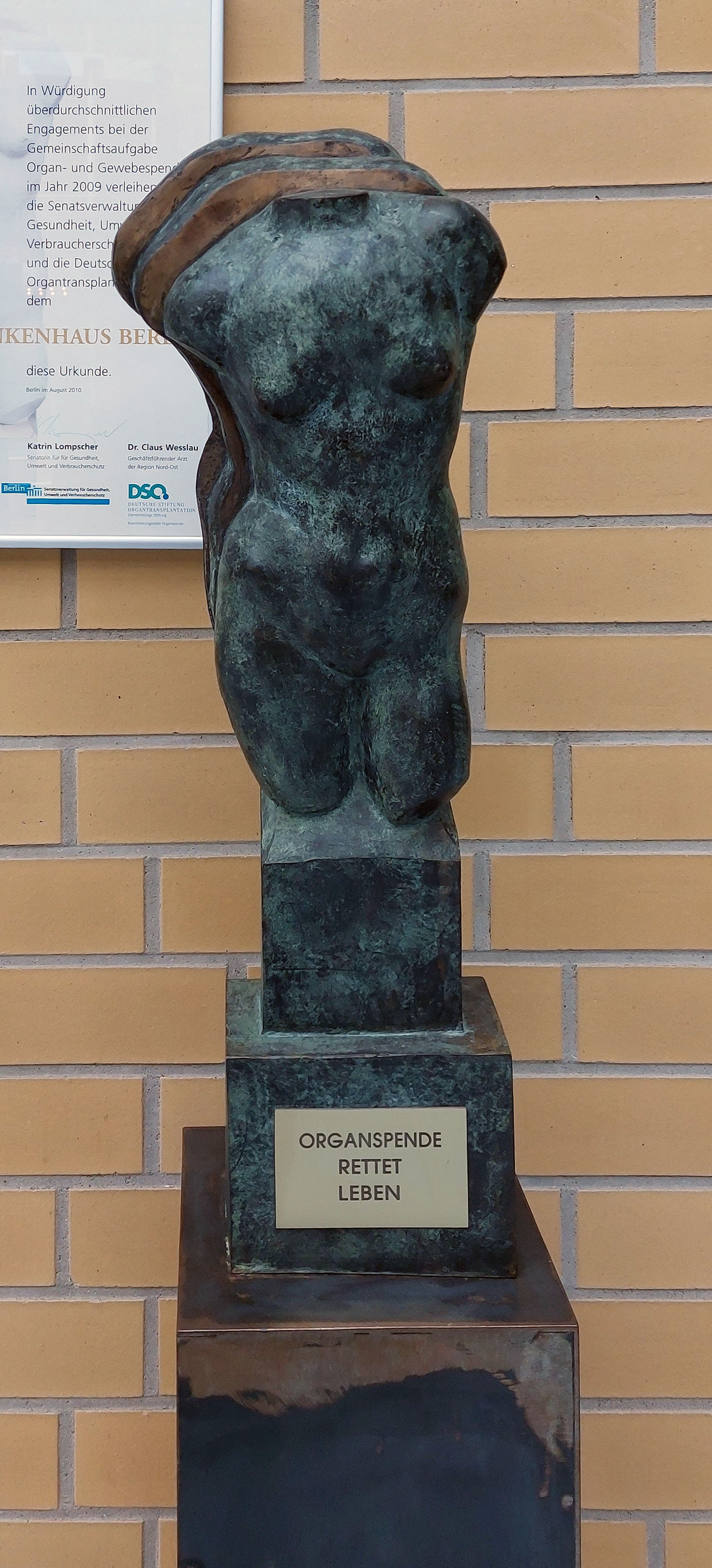
Sculpture on organ donation at the entrance

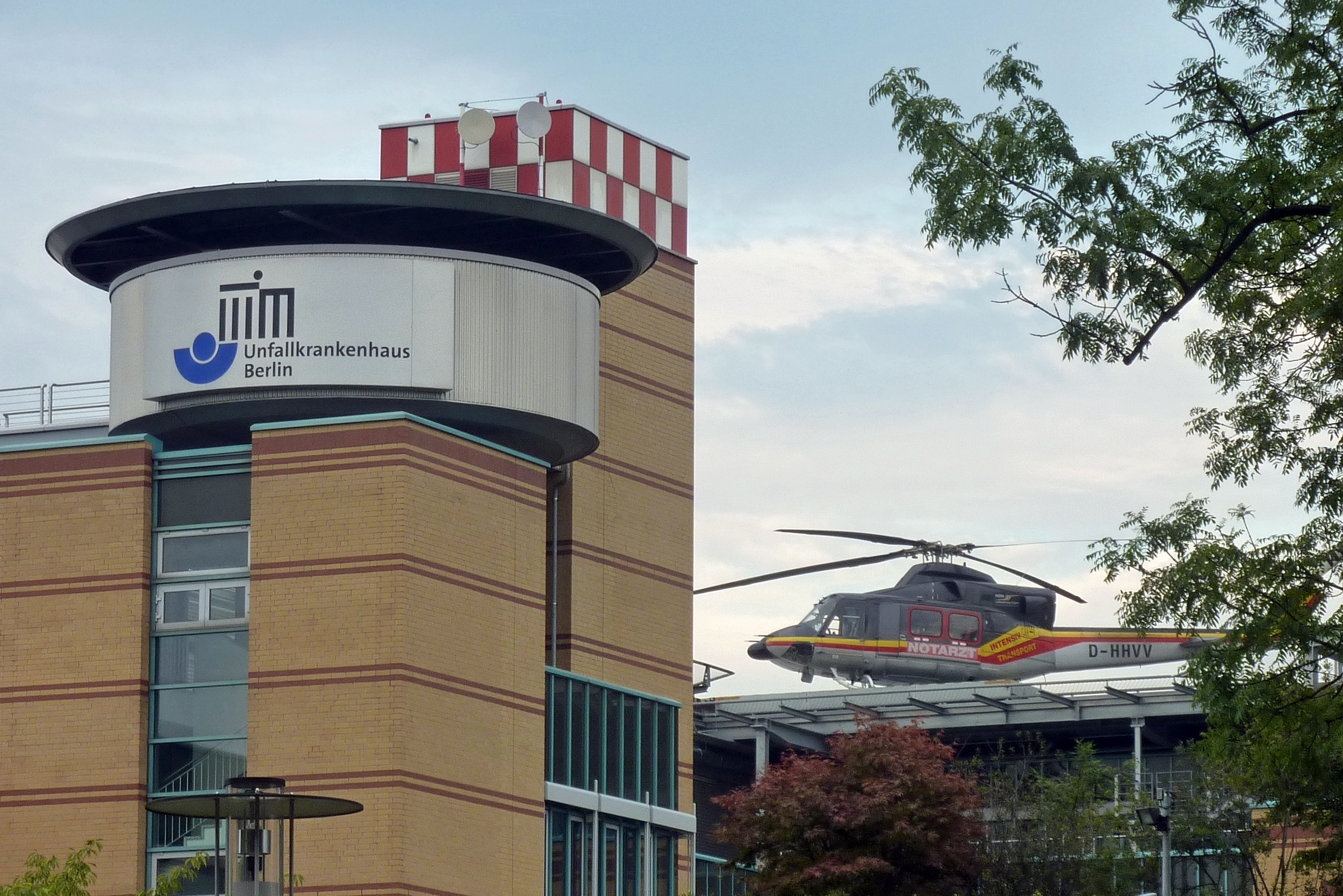
Rooftop with rescue helicopter (2011)

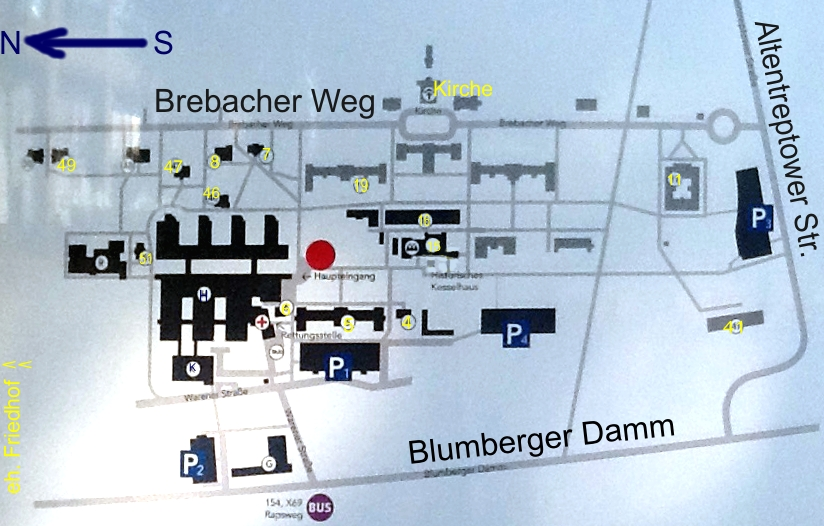
Campus site plan
