= 2006 Lexmark Indy 300 =

Motor race held in Queensland, Australia

Coordinates: 27°59′17.9″S 153°25′42.1″E

(Australia) 2006 Lexmark Indy 300
Race details
- Race 13 of 14 in the 2006 Champ Car World Series season
- Map of the Surfers Paradise Street Circuit
- Date: 21 October, 2006
- Official name: Lexmark Indy 300
- Location: Surfers Paradise Street Circuit; Queensland, Australia
- Course: Temporary street circuit 2.795 mi / 4.498 km
- Distance: 59 laps 164.905 mi / 265.382 km
- Weather: Partly cloudy, intermittent rain showers

Pole position
- Driver: Will Power (Team Australia)
- Time: 1:31.403

Fastest lap
- Driver: (Canada) Paul Tracy (Forsythe Championship Racing)
- Time: 1:33.776 (on lap 39 of 59)

Podium
- First: (France) Nelson Philippe (CTE Racing - HVM)
- Second: (Mexico) Mario Domínguez (Rocketsports Racing)
- Third: (Canada) Alex Tagliani (Team Australia)

The 2006 Lexmark Indy 300 was a Champ Car World Series motor race that was held on 21 October 2006, at the Surfers Paradise Street Circuit in Queensland, Australia in front of 101,066 spectators. It was the 13th and penultimate round of the 2006 Champ Car World Series and the 16th running of the event. Nelson Philippe of CTE Racing - HVM won the 59-lap race from the fifth position. Rocketsports Racing driver Mario Domínguez finished second and Team Australia's Alex Tagliani took third.

Will Power posted the fastest timed laps of both qualifying sessions on Friday and Saturday and earned his first career pole position; it was the first pole for an Australian driver in the series since 1981. He pulled away from the other drivers and led the first 13 laps before making a pit stop. His performance was later hindered because of a lap-28 collision with Sébastien Bourdais. With varying pit stop strategies between teams, Jan Heylen, Charles Zwolsman Jr., Oriol Servià, Philippe, Paul Tracy, Domínguez, and Antônio Pizzonia all inherited the lead for at least one lap. After Pizzonia's stop, Philippe held off a hard charge from Domínguez to take his first (and only) career victory, becoming the youngest winner in Champ Car World Series history at 20 years, two months, and 29 days old. There were five caution flags and eight lead changes during the race.

Entering the race, Bourdais, A. J. Allmendinger, and Justin Wilson were mathematically eligible to win the Drivers' Championship. However, Wilson was eliminated from contention when he suffered a wrist injury from contacting a tyre wall in a pre-qualifying practice session. During the race, Allmendinger crashed into a barrier on lap 19. These two incidents, coupled with Bourdais' eighth-place finish, ensured Bourdais the Drivers' Championship for the third consecutive year, a feat which had not been achieved since Ted Horn did so from 1946 to 1948.

== Background ==
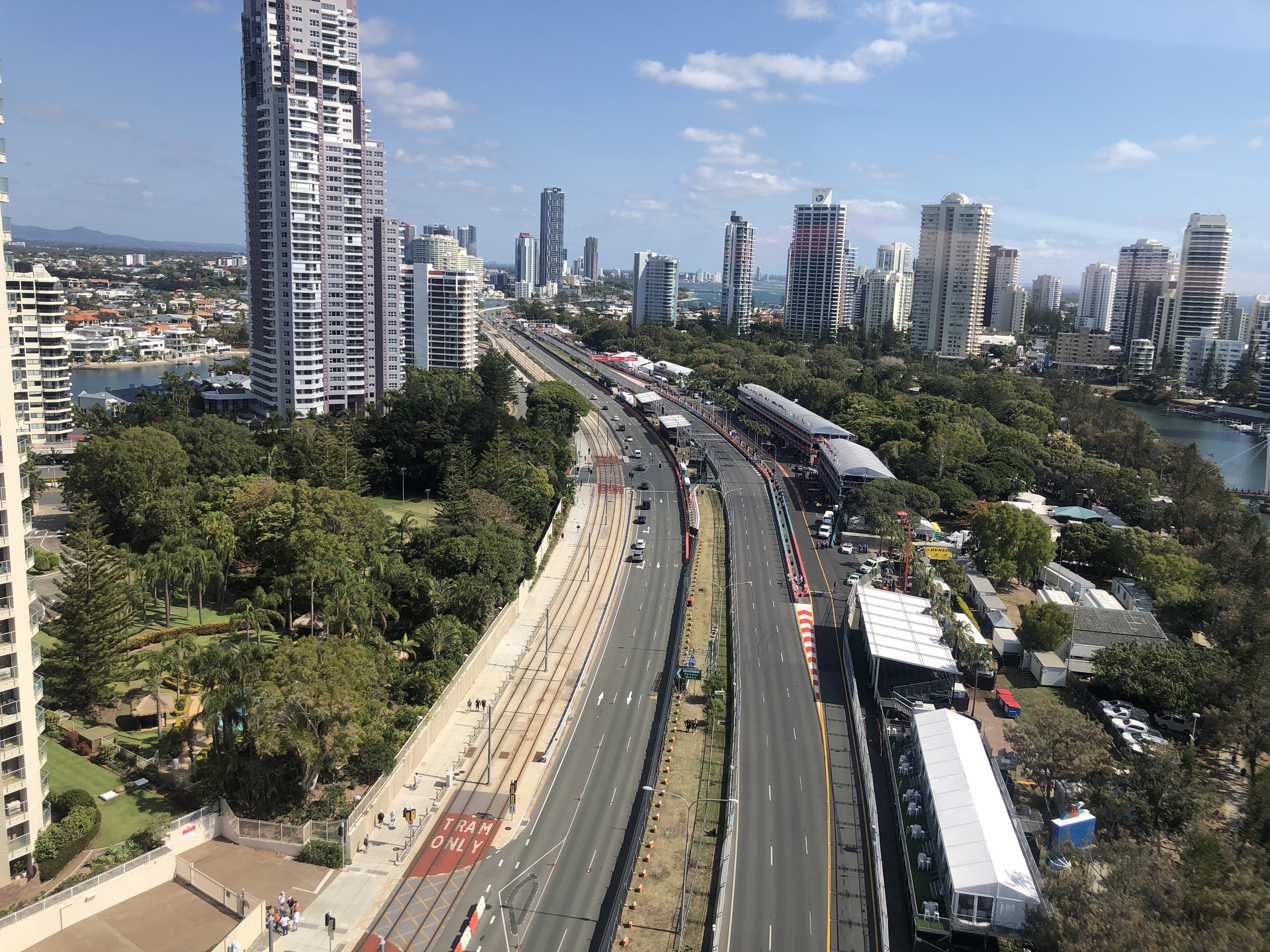
The Surfers Paradise Street Circuit (pictured in 2019), where the race was held.

The 2006 Lexmark Indy 300 was the 13th and penultimate round of the 2006 Champ Car World Series and the only race of the season to be held outside of the Americas. The 16th running of the event dating back to 1991, it was confirmed to be included in the Champ Car World Series' 2006 schedule in August 2005 and was held at the 12-turn 4.498 km (2.795 mi) Surfers Paradise Street Circuit in Queensland, Australia on 21 October 2006. The V8 Supercars, V8 Utes, Aussie Racing Cars, and Carrera Cup hosted support races that same weekend. Tyre supplier Bridgestone brought two types of dry tyres (the harder-tread Standard and the softer-tread Alternate) and grooved-tread rain tyres.

Heading into the race, Sébastien Bourdais held the lead in the Drivers' Championship with 338 points, 58 ahead of second-placed A. J. Allmendinger and 69 more than third-placed Justin Wilson. Paul Tracy was fourth on 184 points, while Nelson Philippe's 182 points gave him the fifth position in the standings. Because a maximum of 70 points were available over the season's last two races, only the top-three drivers — Bourdais, Allmendinger, and Wilson — mathematically had a chance to win the championship. Bourdais needed to finish ninth or better to clinch his third successive title, no matter where Allmendinger or Wilson finished. Though he hoped to back up his win the previous year, Bourdais simply hoped to have a peaceful weekend: "I'd be happy to repeat last year's race where we clinched the championship with a win, but I just hope we enjoy ourselves, that is our main focus."

Three driver changes occurred prior to the race. Antônio Pizzonia replaced Tõnis Kasemets in Rocketsports Racing's No. 18 car, marking his first start in the series since he finished 11th in the Champ Car Grand Prix de Montreal in August despite issues with his team's radio communications. Andreas Wirth, who won two races and finished third in the 2006 Atlantic Championship standings, made his Champ Car World Series debut with Dale Coyne Racing, taking the seat of Juan Cáceres. For the remainder of the season, series debutant Ryan Briscoe joined RuSPORT in their secondary No. 10 car, which they fielded for the first time since its primary driver, 2002 series champion Cristiano da Matta, suffered life-threatening injuries in a testing crash at Road America two months prior. Briscoe had competed in several racing series in 2006, including the IRL IndyCar Series, A1 Grand Prix, and the Rolex Grand Am Series' 24 Hours of Daytona. He was one of two Australian drivers that took part in the Lexmark Indy 300, along with Will Power.

== Practice and qualifying ==
=== Friday, 19 October ===
Two practice sessions were held prior to the race on Sunday, one 75-minute session on Friday and one 60-minute session on Saturday. Bourdais set the fastest lap of the session after the checkered flag was flown with a time of 1 minute and 33.441 seconds, beating Alex Tagliani, Wilson, Power, and Tracy. Wilson failed to post a quicker lap when he applied the brakes too late in turn one and stalled, as did Allmendinger in turn three earlier in the session. Two red flags paused the session: the first was for Wirth skidding into a tyre barrier and the second was for Tracy slamming into a left-side wall at the chicane in turn seven after one of his tyres punctured.

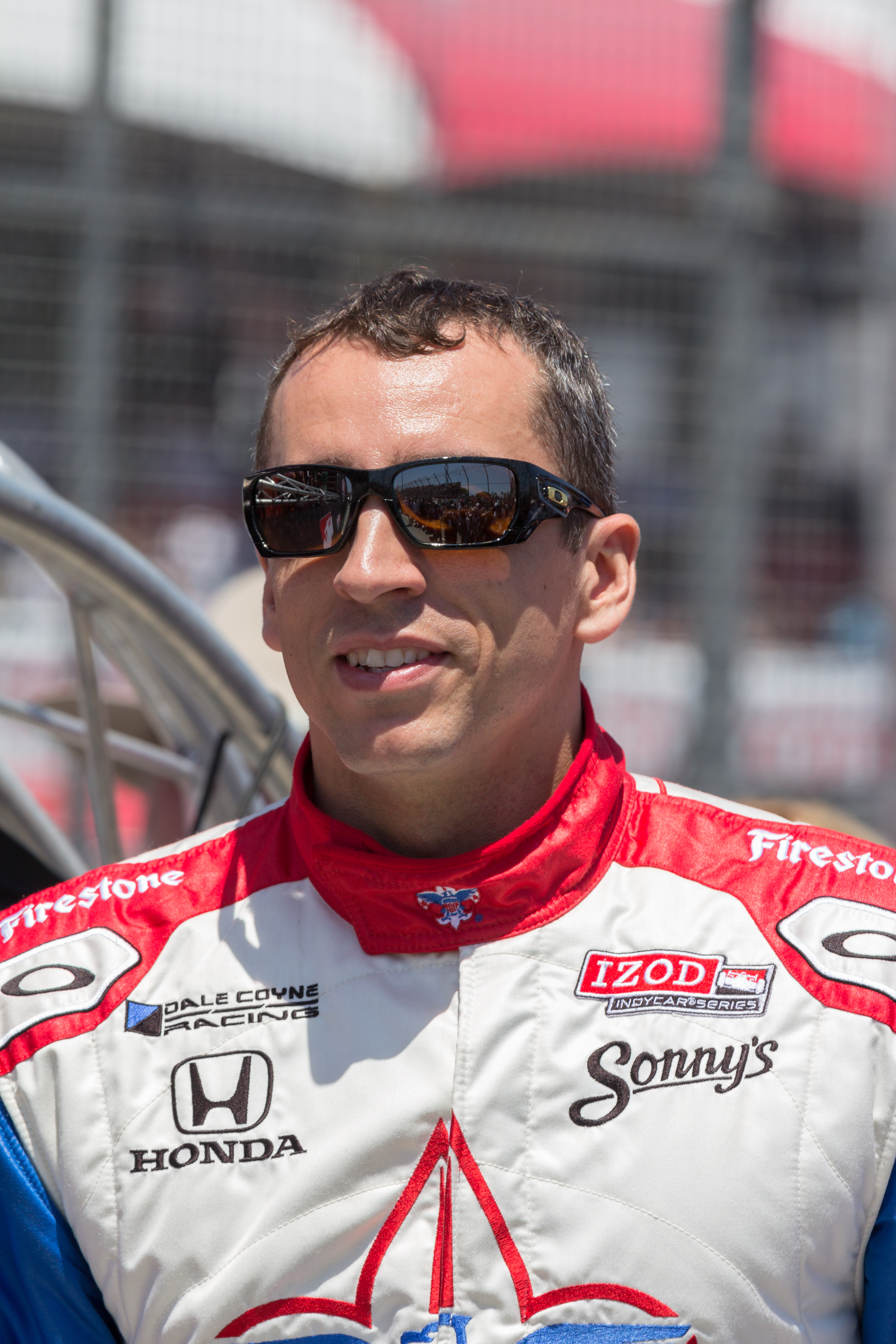
Justin Wilson (pictured in 2013) did not start the race because of a wrist injury he suffered after contacting a tyre wall.

Two qualifying sessions were held on Friday and Saturday afternoon. Each session was divided into three segments; the first was a 15-minute preliminary practice session, the second was a 10-minute break, and the third was 30-minute open qualifications. At least 20 minutes of the qualifications were required to be held under green flag conditions, and the segment was allowed to be extended until the 20-minute requirement was met. The drivers' fastest overall time of the two sessions would determine their starting position. The fastest driver(s) at the end of the qualifying sessions were ensured a front-row starting position and earned one championship point.

Allmendinger was the fastest driver of the first preliminary practice segment at 1 minute and 33.420 seconds, with Bourdais in second, Mario Domínguez in third, Philippe in fourth, and Oriol Servià in fifth. The session was stopped when Briscoe crashed into the wall at the turn-two chicane and was assisted out of his car by track marshals, while Jan Heylen's car came to a standstill. Wilson also made slight contact with a tire wall on the inside of the chicane, which caused the handlebars of his steering wheel to slip out of his hands and sprain his right wrist. The Champ Car medical staff forced him not to partake in the qualifying session, thus preventing him from potentially gaining a championship point and eliminating him from championship contention.

Power set the fastest time of the Friday qualifying session, held under sunny skies, at 1 minute and 31.403 seconds and earned the provisional pole position, much to the delight of the Australian spectators. Because of the qualifying procedure, Power was guaranteed to start on the front row for the race, becoming the first Australian driver to do so in the history of the Lexmark Indy 300. Bourdais, in second, was 0.371 seconds slower; during an on-track run, he experienced a tyre lock-up as he made an adjustment in his cockpit which forced him off-course. The cars that he let by were slower than him and impended him from recording a faster lap. Bruno Junqueira took third while driving on the Standard tyres. As he ran with his Alternates, he clipped the tyre wall in turn seven and bent his steering column. Servià took fourth, but his last lap was nullified by a red flag with two minutes remaining that was caused by fifth-place qualifier Allmendinger, who crashed in the chicane with two minutes left. The top-ten positions were completed by Phillipe, Dan Clarke, Tagliani, Domínguez, and Pizzonia; Andrew Ranger, Haylen, Charles Zwolsman Jr., and Wirth, who caused a red flag halfway through the session when he stalled, occupied the next four positions. Tracy's team unloaded a spare car, but an oil leak prevented Tracy from driving it during qualifying. Along with Wilson and Briscoe, who did not qualify because of their practice incidents, Katherine Legge was also sidelined because she suffered engine issues that her team was unable to resolve in time.

After the session, it was announced that Wilson had suffered a broken metacarpal bone in his practice crash. His team, RuSPORT, resultantly withdrew him from the race.

=== Saturday, 20 October ===
Allmendinger led the second practice session on Saturday morning with a 1 minute, 32.929 second-lap, while his Forsythe Championship Racing teammate Tracy took second. The Newman/Haas Racing pair of Junqueira and Bourdais was third and fourth, respectively, and Pizzonia was fifth-quickest. The session was held under overcast skies and sporadic rainfall. Wirth stalled his car after skidding off-course and lost eight minutes of on-track time for prompting a red flag. With twenty minutes left in the session, Legge caused the second stoppage when she slid into a tire barrier. Briscoe spun in turn 12, causing the third and final red flag with less than six minutes left.

After the session, a larger rain shower fell over the circuit, but dissipated by the time the second pre-qualifying practice segment began. Junqueira was quickest in the session at 1 minute and 34.162 seconds; Allmendinger, Power, Phillipe, and Servià rounded out the top-five. The session was put on hold halfway through when Pizzonia crashed into a tyre wall in the twelfth corner. Domínguez, Pizzonia's Rocketsports Racing teammate, simultaneously went off-track in turn six and refired his car with help from track marshals.

"I feel awesome actually. It's great for Team Australia and to be in Australia and be an Australian driver, couldn't have hoped for anything better. The good thing is the car is quick. I think when we did a long run in practice today, and the car was very consistent; I think in the race tomorrow we can maintain a good speed."

— Will Power after earning his first career pole position.

The second qualifying session was held under partly cloudy conditions. Many drivers set lap times early in the session in anticipation of rain, which ultimately never came. Power only began his qualifying attempt with eight minutes left in the session. His last lap, timed at 1 minute and 31.839 seconds, earned him his first career pole position. It was the first time that an Australian driver won the pole for a Champ Car World Series race since Geoff Brabham in the 1981 Los Angeles Times 500. Immediately after Bourdais set the session's top time (1:31.536), he hit a tyre bundle to the right of the kerb in turn one and crashed hard into the left-side wall. Because the red flag was issued for his incident, his time was erased. However, he still started in second on account of his fastest time from the Friday qualifying session. The placement of the tyre bundle near the kerb prompted criticism from Bourdais, Tracy, Wilson, and others after the session.

Tracy led for most of the qualifying session, but his guaranteed front-row position was denied from him when Power set his quick time, 0.120 seconds faster than Tracy; he was thus lined up in third place. Junqueira took fourth, Phillipe fifth, and Servià sixth. Allmendinger's time of 1:31.405 at the session's end, which would have placed him second place, was quickly negated because it was completed during a red flag period caused by Legge spinning in turn four, dropping him to seventh as a result. Clarke, Tagliani, and Domínguez took the remaining positions in the top ten, and Briscoe, Ranger, Pizzonia, Heylen, Zwolsman, Legge, and Wirth completed the starting grid for the race.

=== Qualifying classification ===
Final qualifying results
Pos	No.	Driver	Team	Q1	Q2	Best	Grid
1	5	(Australia) Will Power	Team Australia	1:31.403	1:31.839	1:31.403	1
2	1	(France) Sébastien Bourdais	Newman/Haas Racing	1:31.774	1:32.212	1:31.774	2
3	3	(Canada) Paul Tracy	Forsythe Championship Racing	—	1:31.959	1:31.959	3
4	2	(Brazil) Bruno Junqueira	Newman/Haas Racing	1:32.265	1:32.809	1:32.265	4
5	4	(France) Nelson Philippe	CTE Racing - HVM	1:32.783	1:32.348	1:32.348	5
6	6	(Spain) Oriol Servià	PKV Racing	1:32.371	1:33.674	1:32.371	6
7	7	(United States) A. J. Allmendinger	Forsythe Championship Racing	1:32.536	1:33.761	1:32.536	7
8	14	(United Kingdom) Dan Clarke	CTE Racing - HVM	1:32.821	1:33.750	1:32.821	8
9	15	(Canada) Alex Tagliani	Team Australia	1:32.933	1:32.845	1:32.845	9
10	8	(Mexico) Mario Domínguez	Rocketsports Racing	1:33.267	1:32.974	1:32.974	10
11	10	(Australia) Ryan Briscoe	RuSPORT	—	1:33.043	1:33.043	11
12	27	(Canada) Andrew Ranger	Conquest Racing	1:34.155	1:33.564	1:33.564	12
13	18	(Brazil) Antônio Pizzonia	Rocketsports Racing	1:33.736	—	1:33.736	13
14	11	(Belgium) Jan Heylen	Dale Coyne Racing	1:34.593	1:34.182	1:34.182	14
15	34	(Netherlands) Charles Zwolsman Jr.	Conquest Racing	1:35.017	1:34.282	1:34.282	15
16	20	(United Kingdom) Katherine Legge	PKV Racing	—	1:34.634	1:34.634	16
17	19	(Germany) Andreas Wirth	Dale Coyne Racing	1:37.300	1:35.176	1:35.176	17
WD	9	(United Kingdom) Justin Wilson	RuSPORT	—	—	No time	—^{1}

Notes

- ^1 — Justin Wilson was withdrawn from the race after suffering a wrist injury in the pre-qualifying practice session on Friday.

== Warm-up ==
A 30-minute warm-up session was scheduled to begin at 09:00 Australian Eastern Standard Time (UTC+10:00) on Sunday to allow teams to make their final preparations prior to the race. However, the session was delayed by 11 minutes and shortened to a 25-minute duration because of a large oil slick that was laid on the circuit by a car in a support race. Tracy set the fastest time of the session at 1 minute and 34.847 seconds, outpacing Power, Allmendinger, Clarke, and Phillipe. The session was only stopped once, when Wirth spun and stalled in the ninth corner.

== Race ==
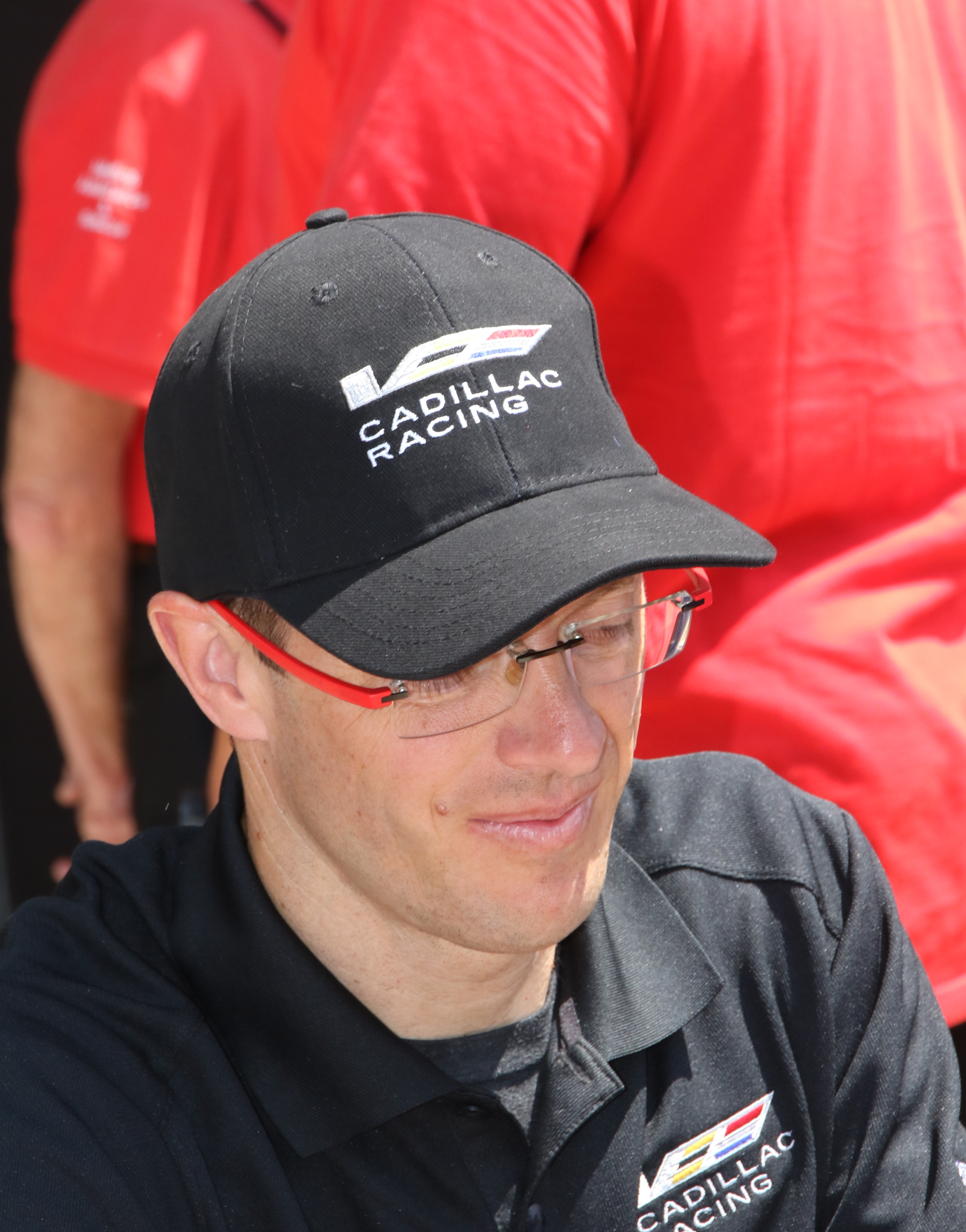
Sébastien Bourdais (pictured in 2023) earned his third consecutive Champ Car World Series title.

Towards the start of the 59-lap, 265.389 km (164.905 mi) race, weather conditions had improved from Saturday with sunny skies, ambient temperatures of 23 to 25 °C (73 to 77 °F), and track temperatures of 30 to 41 °C (86 to 106 °F). An estimated 101,066 people spectated the race. The race began at 13:10 local time; the first lap of the race was held under caution-flag conditions because half of the field had not lined up properly. Champ Car officials ordered a single-file rolling start to prevent an accident in turn one. The procedure worked, marking the first clean start of the race since 1999 and allowing all of the drivers to maintain their starting grid positions. Allmendinger drove hot on Servià's trail until he out-braked him in the first turn to take sixth place on lap nine. That same lap, Legge skidded into the run-off area in turn eight. Junqueira lost the fourth position to Philippe in turn one on lap 10 and the fifth position to Allmendinger in turn five on lap 12. Meanwhile, Zwolsman made his first pit stop of the race on lap 11 as part of his team's strategy to make up positions. On lap 13, Tracy passed Bourdais for second place in turn eight.

A full-course caution flag was issued for the second time on lap 14, when Clarke oversteered into a tyre wall in turn 12. All of the leaders elected to make stops under caution except Heylen and Zwolsman, both of whom inherited the top-two positions. As Tracy exited his pit stall, he collided with Power, which punctured Tracy's right-rear tyre and damaged Power's front wing. Tracy's Forsythe Championship Racing teammate Allmendinger suffered similar misfortune. He drove off of pit road, unaware that a fuel hose was attached to his car; the hose was resultantly ripped open, igniting a methanol fire that was quickly extinguished by the pit crews of Allmendinger and Junqueira, costing the latter driver several positions. No one was injured in the fire. Both drivers were forced to make a second stop on lap 15 in order to repair their cars. The green flag was waved on lap 17, with Heylen leading Zwolsman, Power, Bourdais, and Philippe. Briscoe slowed to a stop in turn eight, barely avoiding making contact with a right-side barrier, and Legge did the same while trying to maneuver around him. Both cars were restarted and drove away.

On the 19th lap, Allmendinger slammed the right-side barrier exiting turn three and parked his car on the short straight away before turn four. The third caution was flown a lap later to retrieve his car. Allmendinger was the only other championship contender besides Bourdais that competed in the race, so with his retirement, Bourdais was ensured his third Champ Car World Series title. As the skies grew cloudier around the circuit, Heylen dove into pit road under the caution along with Tracy, Domínguez, Junqueira, and Briscoe, thus handing the lead to Zwolsman ahead of the lap-24 restart. Four laps later, Bourdais experienced brake lock-up entering turn three as he attempted to pass Power for second place and careened into Power's left-front tyre. Power came to a stop at the scene of the collision, prompting the fourth caution, before driving off with suspension damage. During the caution, Zwolsman, Bourdais, Pizzonia, Heylen, and Briscoe made stops for new tyres and fuel, while Power pitted twice to alleviate his damage. Servià inherited the lead because of Zwolsman's stop and was followed by Philippe, Tagliani, Ranger, and Tracy for the restart on the 33rd lap. Bourdais was issued a drive-through penalty for what Champ Car officials deemed "avoidable contact" with Power. Both Conquest Racing drivers endured hindrances during the restart; Zwolsman collided with a wall in turn four, while Ranger fell to 12th after spinning in turn 12. On lap 35, Philippe overtook Servià for the lead on the front stretch. As Servià entered the first turn, he locked his brakes and made slight contact with the rear of Philippe's car, though neither car sustained any damage. Two laps later, Tagliani passed Servià in the fifth turn for second place. Tracy then made an aggressive pass on Servià to drop him to fourth on the 38th lap, which caused Servià's tyres to flat-spot and allowed Junqueira to close in on him.

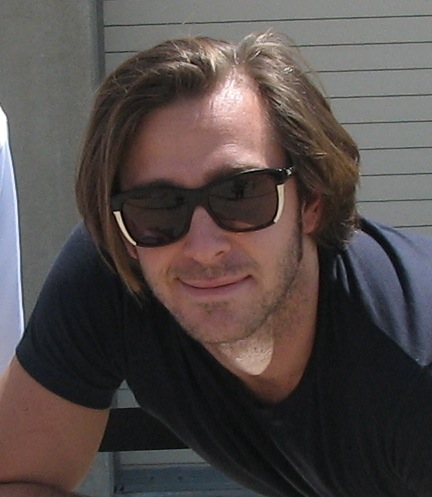
Nelson Philippe (pictured in 2009) became the youngest winner in Champ Car World Series history.

Philippe ceded the lead to Tracy on lap 40 during a cycle of green-flag pit stops. Tracy had previously set the fastest lap of the race the lap prior with a time of 1 minute, 33.776 seconds. Domínguez assumed the lead for the first and only time on the 43rd lap, giving up the position to Pizzonia the following lap. Servià, meanwhile, was black-flagged for leaking oil on the circuit. The fifth (and final) caution flag was issued on lap 44 for Heylen crashing into the tyre wall in-between the 11th and 12th corners. Legge had also crashed into a wall in the seventh turn. It is believed that these two crashes were caused by light precipitation around the track. The only driver to make a stop under the caution was Briscoe; Servià had retired from the race due to a mechanical issue. Pizzonia led the field back up to speed for the lap-50 restart. Tracy attempted to pass Domínguez for third place after he failed to pass Philippe on the front stretch, but ran out of room and drove through the turn one chicane. Though Tracy did not advance his position, officials felt that he made up unfair ground on fifth-placed Tagliani and was ordered to give up his position to him, which he eventually did on lap 53. A lap prior, Pizzonia pitted, allowing Philippe to take the lead.

Domínguez made a hard charge on Philippe in the closing laps, even using all of his push-to-pass boost on the final lap. It was to no avail, however, as Philippe held onto the lead and earned his first career victory in his 37th Champ Car World Series start. At 20 years, two months, and 29 days old, Philippe became the youngest winner in series history, surpassing the record set by Scott Dixon in the 2001 Lehigh Valley Grand Prix. He was also the 16th different winner in the 16-year history of the Lexmark Indy 300. Domínguez finished runner-up, 0.728 seconds behind Philippe, with Tagliani completing the podium finishers. Tracy came in fourth, Ranger fifth, Junqueira sixth, and Zwolsman seventh. By virtue of his eighth-place finish, Bourdais clinched his third consecutive Drivers' Championship in the Champ Car World Series, becoming the first driver to accomplish the feat in top-level American open-wheel car racing since Ted Horn in 1946–1948. Wirth, Pizzonia, Briscoe, and Power were the last classified finishers. During the course of the race, there were eight lead changes among eight different drivers. Philippe and Power each led 13 laps, more than any other driver.

=== Post-race ===
In a press conference after the race, Philippe expressed disbelief and jubilance in his first win, saying: "I can't believe this day has arrived! I'm almost sick from it, I could have thrown up. The team and my engineer Will Phillips gave me a great car. The strategy was superb and I just gave it my all. I came to Champ Car as a seventeen-year-old with not much experience in motor racing, but I worked hard and improved on and off the track. I knew I could do it and now that I've succeeded, I just want to work even harder for even more success." In his five American open-wheel car racing starts since this race, Philippe never won again. Second-placed Domínguez congratulated Philippe for his win and was pleased to bring positive momentum into the season-ending Gran Premio Telmex during what he described as "the worst year of my life." Tagliani felt empathetic for Power's troubles in his home race because: "I've been there in Montreal, being on the pole and could win the race and something goes wrong. So for our team it was quite important to try to come home with a podium finish." He also revealed that his car had low battery voltage, which forced him to save lots of fuel towards the end of the race and cost him a shot at a potential win.

After the race, Bourdais was awarded the Vanderbilt Cup for earning his third Champ Car World Series title. In regards to his race, he described his mindset as "win or nothing" after Allmendinger's crash and spoke on his collision with Power, "I don't know what happened, but the car started to run really, really hard over the bumps in the middle of the track, and as soon as I touched the brakes, the right front (tyre) locked and I was never going to stop the car so I just bailed out. And unfortunately Will either thought I was going to make the corner or I don't know what." Allmendinger was very disappointed with his early accident and revealed that him ripping the fuel hose hindered the car's handling, which is why he crashed. He was, however, pleased that none of his pit crew members were injured. This wound up being Allmendinger's last race in the Champ Car World Series before he entered NASCAR and was fired from Forsythe Championship Racing as a result.

Power was left subdued with his poor result and blamed Bourdais for their collision. For the 2007 event, he joked that he would look in his mirrors more. The co-owners of Team Australia agreed with Power, as Craig Gore considered it a "stupid move" and Derrick Walker called it an "uncharacteristic move" by Bourdais. Tracy was "so pissed off" with his late-race penalty, stating: "I tried to pass Domínguez, he nearly ran me off the track and I short-cut the chicane. I didn’t gain any time, I didn’t gain a position and I have to give up a spot to a guy who was four seconds behind me?!" He believed that Champ Car officials only penalized him so that a Team Australia car could finish on the podium in their home race. Briscoe expressed delight with his first Champ Car World Series race because he had gained experience and set his fastest lap towards the end of the race.

With one race remaining in the season, Bourdais had 353 points and an insurmountable 68-point advantage over second-place Allmendinger, which earned him the Drivers' Championship. Wilson was third on 269 points, while Philippe's 214 points were enough to overtake Tracy, who had 209 points, for fourth in the standings.

=== Race classification ===
Final race results
Pos	No.	Driver	Team	Laps	Time/retired	Grid	Laps led	Points
1	4	(France) Nelson Philippe	CTE Racing - HVM	59	1:50:50.985	5	13	32^{1}
2	8	(Mexico) Mario Domínguez	Rocketsports Racing	59	+0.727	10	1	29^{1}^{2}
3	15	(Canada) Alex Tagliani	Team Australia	59	+6.053	9	0	25
4	3	(Canada) Paul Tracy	Forsythe Championship Racing	59	+7.238	3	3	25^{1}^{3}
5	27	(Canada) Andrew Ranger	Conquest Racing	59	+9.376	12	0	21
6	2	(Brazil) Bruno Junqueira	Newman/Haas Racing	59	+10.246	4	0	19
7	34	(Netherlands) Charles Zwolsman Jr.	Conquest Racing	59	+16.848	15	10	18^{1}
8	1	(France) Sébastien Bourdais	Newman/Haas Racing	59	+18.978	2	0	15
9	19	(Germany) Andreas Wirth	Dale Coyne Racing	59	+22.195	17	0	13
10	18	(Brazil) Antônio Pizzonia	Rocketsports Racing	59	+44.085	13	8	12^{1}
11	10	(Australia) Ryan Briscoe	RuSPORT	58	+1 lap	11	0	10
12	5	(Australia) Will Power	Team Australia	58	+1 lap	1	13	12^{1}^{4}^{5}
13	6	(Spain) Oriol Servià	PKV Racing	43	Gearbox	6	4	9^{1}
14	11	(Belgium) Jan Heylen	Dale Coyne Racing	42	Contact	14	7	8^{1}
15	20	(United Kingdom) Katherine Legge	PKV Racing	42	Contact	16	0	6
16	7	(United States) A. J. Allmendinger	Forsythe Championship Racing	18	Contact	7	0	5
17	14	(United Kingdom) Dan Clarke	CTE Racing - HVM	12	Contact	8	0	4

Notes

- ^1 — Includes one bonus point for leading at least one lap.
- ^2 — Includes one bonus point for gaining the most positions from starting position to finishing position.
- ^3 — Includes one bonus point for recording the fastest race lap.
- ^4 — Includes one bonus point for being the fastest qualifier in the Friday qualifying session.
- ^5 — Includes one bonus point for being the fastest qualifier in the Saturday qualifying session.

== Championship standings after the race ==
Drivers' Championship standings
+/-	Pos	Driver	Points
	1	(France) **Sébastien Bourdais**	353
	2	(United States) A. J. Allmendinger	285 (–68)
	3	(United Kingdom) Justin Wilson	269 (–84)
1	4	(France) Nelson Philippe	214 (–139)
1	5	(Canada) Paul Tracy	209 (–144)

- Note: Only the top five positions are included.
- **Bold** indicates the national champion.

Previous race: 2006 Grand Prix of Road America	Champ Car World Series; 2006 season	Next race: 2006 Gran Premio Telmex
Previous race: 2005 Lexmark Indy 300	Lexmark Indy 300	Next race: 2007 Lexmark Indy 300
