= Alex Tagliani =

Canadian racing driver (born 1972)

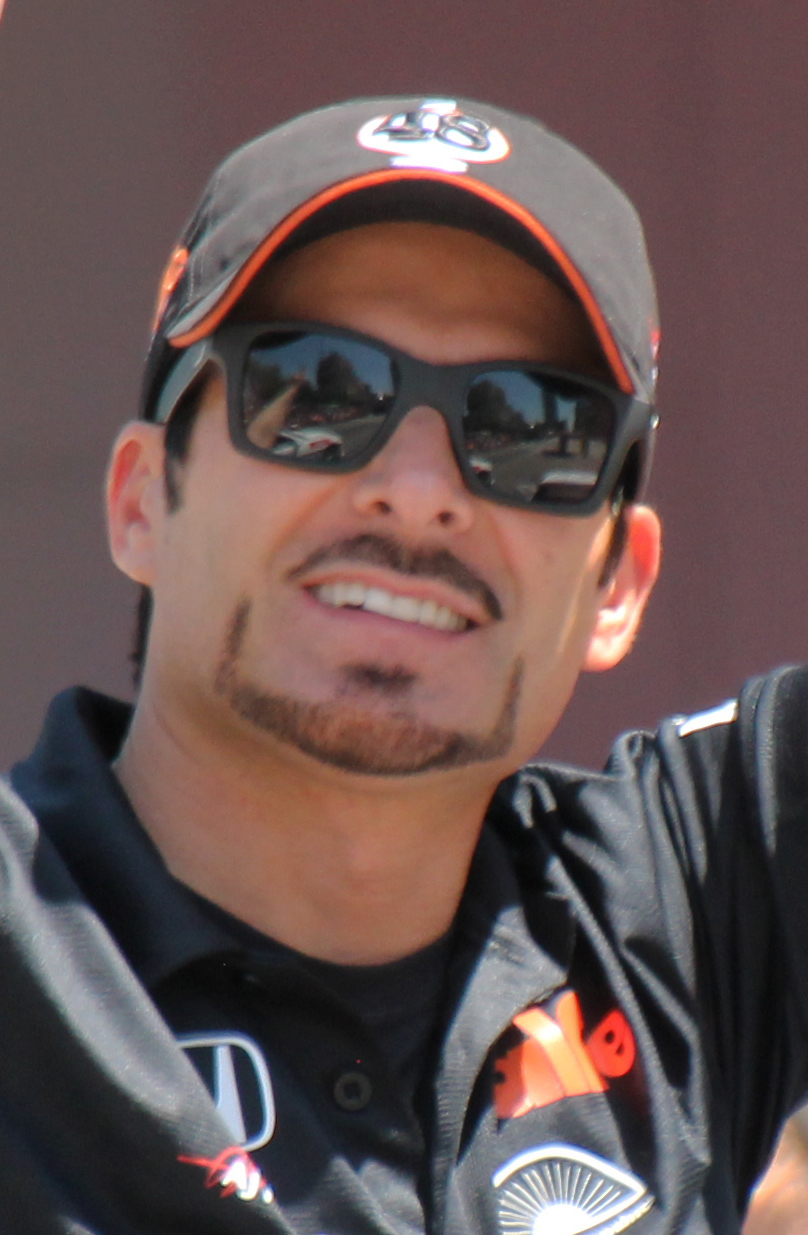
- Alex Tagliani at the 2015 500 Festival Parade in Indianapolis, Indiana
- Nationality: (Canada) Canadian
- Born: Alexandre Tagliani; October 18, 1972 (age 54); Lachenaie, Quebec, Canada
- Awards: 2009 Indianapolis 500 Rookie of the Year

IndyCar Series career
- 73 races run over 9 years
- 2016 position: 31st
- Best finish: 13th (2010)
- First race: 2008 Toyota Grand Prix of Long Beach (Long Beach)
- Last race: 2016 Indianapolis 500 (Indianapolis)
Wins	Podiums	Poles
0	0	3

Champ Car career
- 131 races run over 8 years
- Best finish: 7th (2004, 2005)
- First race: 2000 Marlboro Grand Prix of Miami (Homestead)
- Last race: 2007 Gran Premio Tecate (Mexico City)
- First win: 2004 Champ Car Grand Prix of Road America (Road America)
Wins	Podiums	Poles
1	14	5

NASCAR O'Reilly Auto Parts Series career
- 8 races run over 6 years
- 2016 position: 56th
- Best finish: 39th (2014)
- First race: 2009 NAPA Auto Parts 200 (Montreal)
- Last race: 2016 Road America 180 (Road America)
Wins	Top tens	Poles
0	5	4

NASCAR FedEx Freight Truck Series career
- 6 races run over 6 years
- 2020 position: 65th
- Best finish: 56th (2019)
- First race: 2014 Chevrolet Silverado 250 (Mosport)
- Last race: 2020 Sunoco 159 (Daytona RC)
Wins	Top tens	Poles
0	3	2

NASCAR Canada Series career
- 145 races run over 18 years
- Car no., team: No. 3 (Ed Hakonson Racing); No. 80 (Theetge Motorsports)
- 2026 position: 7th
- Best finish: 2nd (2018)
- First race: 2007 NAPA Autopro 100 (Montreal)
- Last race: 2026 NTN BCA 200 (Delaware)
- First win: 2008 Edmonton 100 (Edmonton Airport)
- Last win: 2026 NAPA 150 (Calabogie)
Wins	Top tens	Poles
13	100	12
- Statistics up to date as of September 20, 2026.

Alexandre Tagliani (/tæɡlɪˈɑːnɪ/; born October 18, 1972), nicknamed "Tag", is a Canadian professional racing driver. He competes full-time in the NASCAR Canada Series, driving the No. 3 Chevrolet Camaro for Ed Hakonson Racing and the No. 80 Chevrolet Camaro for Theetge Motorsports.

Tagliani has competed in a variety of disciplines including open-wheel, stock car, and sports car racing. He has raced in the Atlantic Championship, Champ Car, IndyCar Series, NASCAR Canada Series, and NASCAR Xfinity Series.

== Racing career ==
=== Atlantic Championship ===
Tagliani debuted in the Atlantic Championship in 1996 with P-1 Racing, where he finished seventh in the overall points standings. Switching to Forsythe Racing, he finished third in 1997, fourth in 1998, and fourth in 1999, claiming two wins in each season.

=== Champ Car ===
Tagliani raced in the Champ Car series from 2000, when it was still known as CART, until its demise in 2007. He was signed by Forsythe Racing for the 2000 season replacing Greg Moore.

Tagliani came close to obtaining his first victory in his third start, after taking pole position at Brazil and leading most of the race, but spun out from the lead with nine laps to go.

In 2001, Tagliani was involved in the collision with Alex Zanardi at the Lausitzring that resulted in the loss of Zanardi's legs.

Tagliani remained at Forsythe until the end of 2002, when he was substituted by Paul Tracy. Tagliani found a job with the Rocketsports team in 2003, and remained there for the 2004 season, in which he earned his first and only Champ Car victory at Road America.

In 2005, Tagliani joined Team Australia, which was a rebranding of Derrick Walker's long-running team with the support of Australian businessman Craig Gore, and finished seventh in the championship despite lacking a race engineer. The seventh-place finish would equal the best of his three top-ten championship points finishes.

Tagliani returned to Rocketsports for the 2007 season, and finished tenth in points with a best finish of fourth in the first race of the season. He earned four pole positions during his Champ Car career.

Tagliani, along with many other 2007 Champ Car Drivers, has stated the Panoz DP01 was "one of" the best American Open Wheel Racers he ever drove during his career. This is among the collection of open-wheel cars he drove from the 1990s to modern day, and continues to do so, with less frequency into the 2020s. In the mid 2010s, his career began a focus on stock car racing rather than a large frequency of open-wheel.

=== IndyCar ===
In 2008, after the Rocketsports team decided not to take part in the IndyCar Series, Tagliani made the transition to stock cars and began racing in the NASCAR Canadian Tire Series. He also drove for Conquest Racing in the IndyCar Series Detroit Grand Prix, replacing the injured Enrique Bernoldi. Tagliani continued in the seat for the last two races of the season.

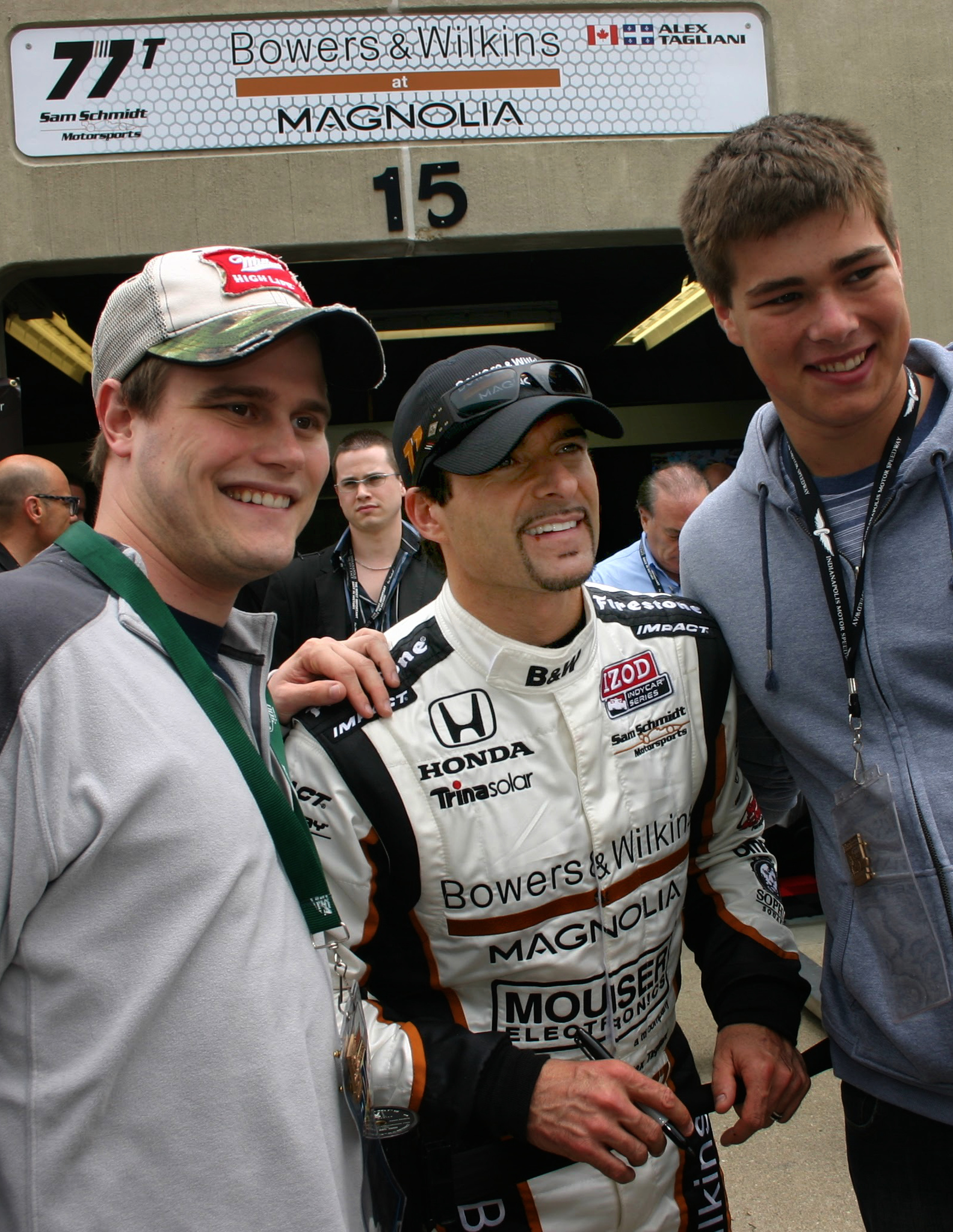
Tagliani with fans at Indianapolis Motor Speedway after winning the pole position for the 2011 Indianapolis 500

Conquest Racing announced that Tagliani would return as a full-time driver for the 2009 season. However, the team ultimately concentrated on road and street course races after the Indianapolis 500; ninth place in Toronto proved his best result. Tagliani left Conquest Racing after the 2009 Rexall Edmonton Indy race in Edmonton, Alberta, Canada.

It was announced on August 28, 2009, that Tagliani had signed a four-year deal with an option for a fifth year to drive for start-up FAZZT Race Team in the IZOD IndyCar Series beginning in 2010.

After a successful 2010 campaign with Tagliani, FAZZT Race Team was looking forward to an even more successful 2011 season, along with the possible expansion on the grid with a second entry. However, the team was purchased by Sam Schmidt on March 1, 2011, and was absorbed into Sam Schmidt Motorsports. Tagliani was retained, along with all sponsors, for a full-time entry during the 2011 season, racing alongside his new teammates Townsend Bell, Wade Cunningham, and Jay Howard.

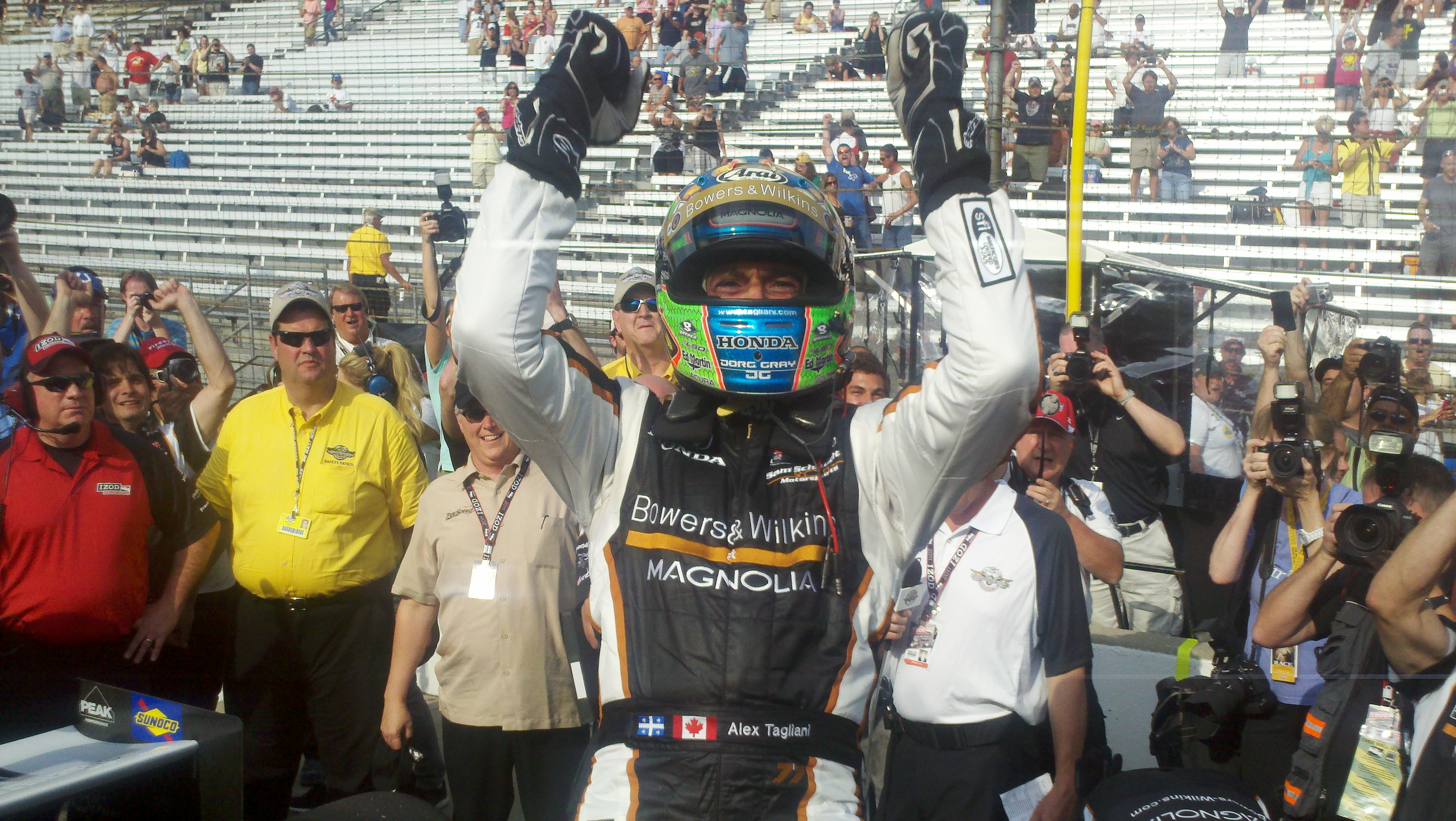
Tagliani celebrating after winning 2011 Indianapolis 500 pole

In 2011, for the 100th anniversary of the first running of the Indianapolis 500, Tagliani qualified on the pole position with a four-lap average of 227.472 mph, besting Scott Dixon in the last run of the day. Unfortunately for Tagliani, he would run wide in turn 4 on lap 147 and make contact with the outside wall, inflicting damage upon the car which would force him to retire from the race the following lap.

To date, Tagliani's best finish in the Indianapolis 500 is tenth, which he achieved in 2010 while driving for FAZZT Race Team. His best performance was arguably the 2016 event when he charged hard from 33rd starting position to lead 11 laps, matching a record set by Tom Sneva in 1980.

=== NASCAR Xfinity and Truck Series ===
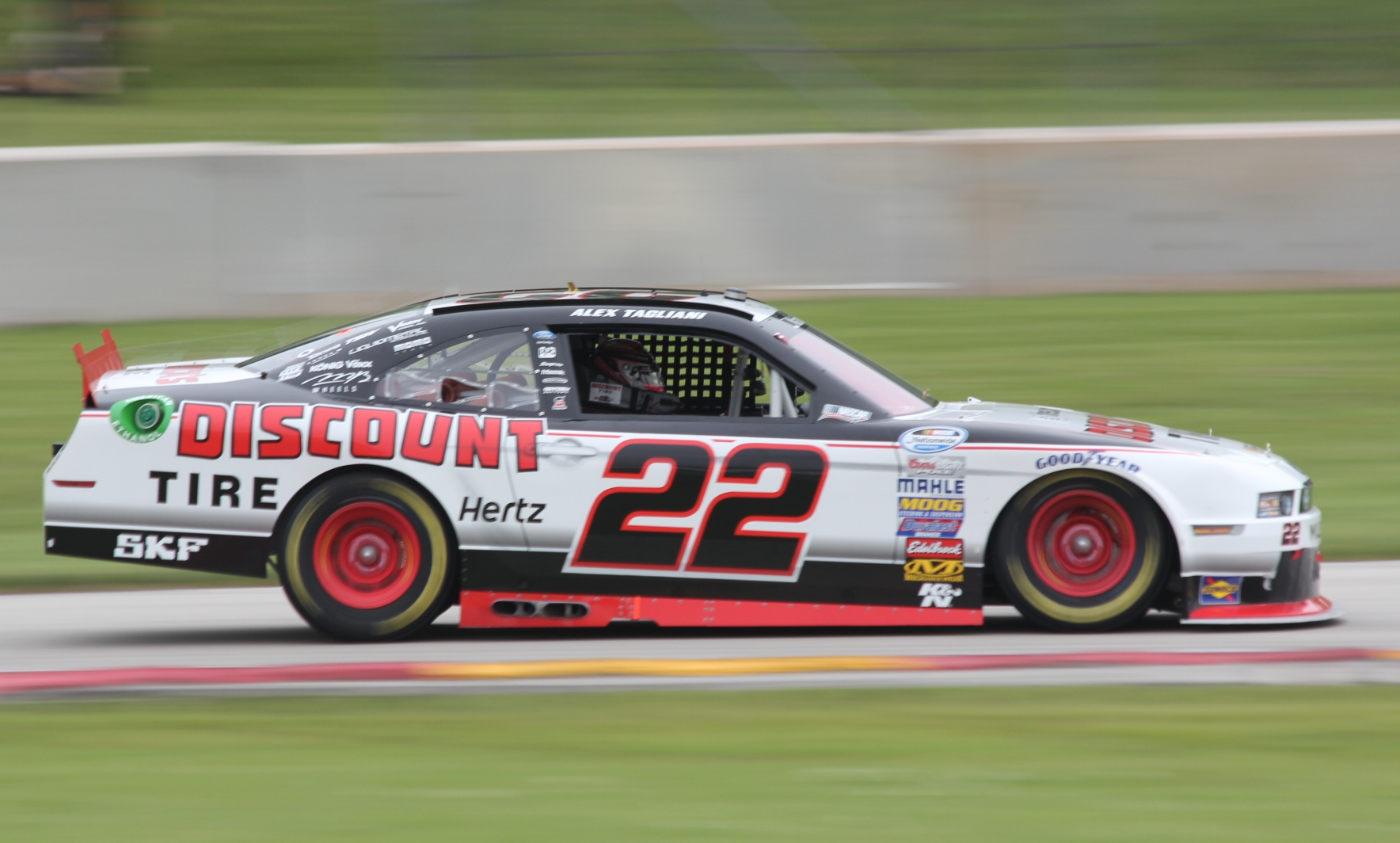
2014 NASCAR Nationwide Series car at Road America

Tagliani has run selected races in the NASCAR Xfinity Series since 2009. That year he entered the Montreal and Phoenix rounds with Pat MacDonald. He drove at Montreal in 2011 for Team Penske and 2012 for Steve Turner. He did not enter any race in 2013.

In 2014, Tagliani announced that he would drive in two races in the series for Team Penske. At Road America for the Gardner Denver 200, Tagliani won the pole position driving Penske's No. 22. Tagliani nearly won his first NNS race leading the second half. However, it was questionable with ten laps to go if Tagliani had enough fuel. A caution came out before the final lap and just as the yellow period began, Tagliani ran out of gas in the extended race and stalled at the start/finish line. Tagliani switched to dry (slick) tires with most of the field on wet tires (on a drying track); he restarted in 23rd place and recovered for second place. At Mid-Ohio, he finished fifth without leading any lap.

Later in 2014, Tagliani was announced as the driver for Brad Keselowski Racing's No. 19 in the Camping World Truck Series event at Canadian Tire Motorsport Park. Despite the race being his very first Truck Series start, he earned the pole position and led the first seven laps. However, he would finish the race in sixteenth.

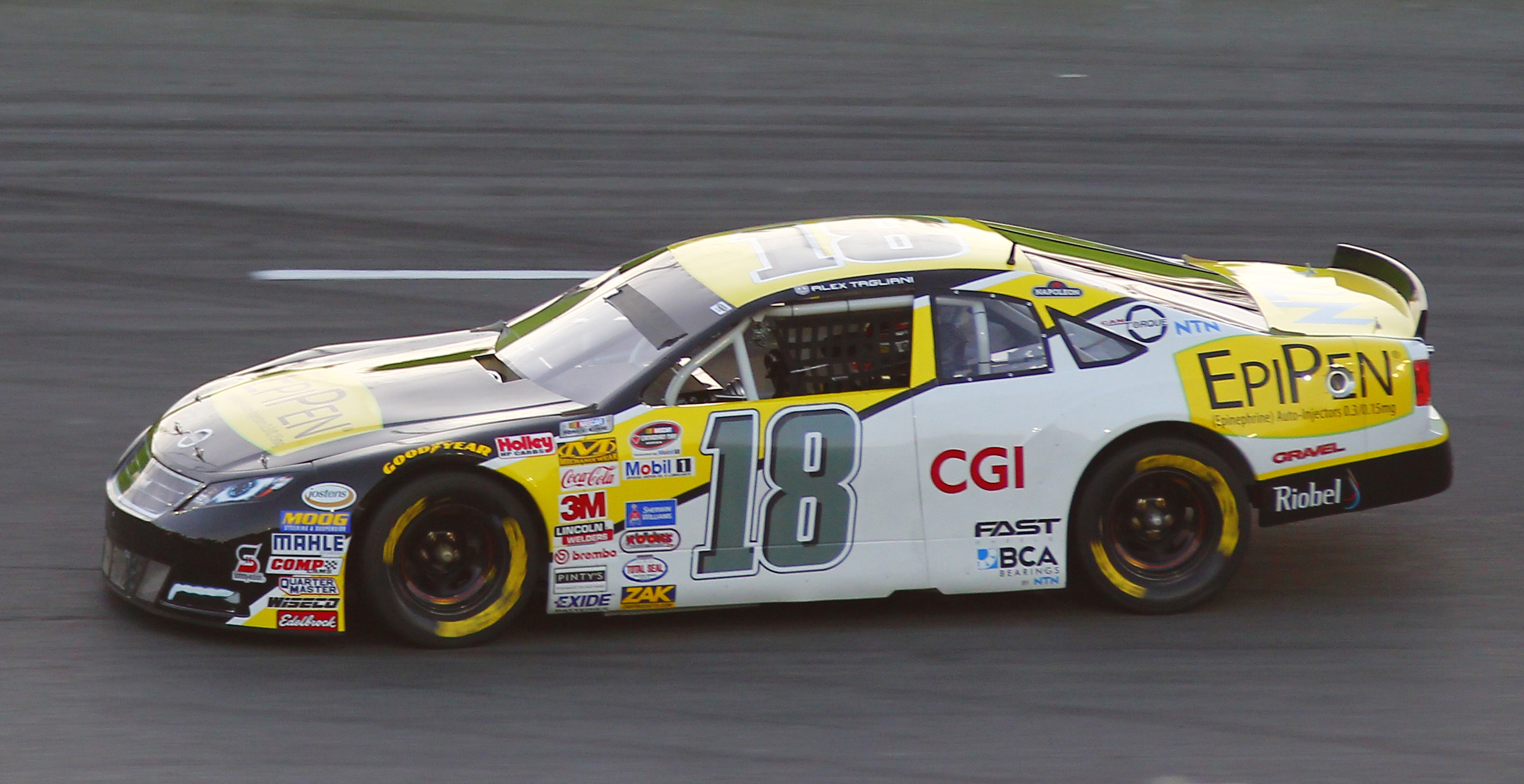
Autodrome Chaudière 2015 - NASCAR Canadian Tire Series (Photo Paul-Émile Poulin-Jacques)

In 2015, Tagliani drove one race for Team Penske in the Xfinity Series race at Mid-Ohio Sports Car Course. He earned the pole and was in contention for the victory, losing the lead in the second-to-final corner of the race after being hit by eventual winner Regan Smith. Two weeks later, Tagliani drove the No. 29 truck for Brad Keselowski Racing at Mosport, leading a total of eight laps and finishing fifth after battling Erik Jones for the lead late in the race.

In 2016, Tagliani made a one-off appearance in the No. 22 for Team Penske at Road America in the Xfinity Series, and earned the pole for the race. He would lead 17 laps and score a seventh-place finish. Tagliani would part ways with Penske at year's end, to make way for other Penske drivers such as Austin Cindric.

Tagliani returned to the Truck Series for the 2017 Mosport race, driving the No. 02 for Young's Motorsports.

For the 2019 Chevrolet Silverado 250, he moved to Kyle Busch Motorsports' No. 51 Toyota. He returned to the team in August 2020 at the Daytona International Speedway road course.

=== NASCAR Canada Series ===
In 2007, Tagliani debuted in the NASCAR Canadian Tire Series, entering two rounds with Dave Jacombs. In 2008, he raced in nine out of 13 races with that team, scoring a win at Edmonton Airport.

Tagliani competed at two NASCAR Canada Series races in 2009, two in 2013 and one in 2013. He scored four pole positions, but his best finishes were fifth.

Tagliani returned as a full-time driver in 2014 with his own team. Again, his best results were fifth, and ended ninth in the overall standings. In 2015, he joined Colin Livingston's team, where he claimed his second win at Sunset and two third-place finishes. In 2016, he scored three wins at Sunset, Toronto and Edmonton International Raceway, and finished third in points.

Tagliani joined Scott Steckly's 22 Racing team in 2017. In 2018, he finished second in the standings behind Louis-Philippe Dumoulin. During the 2019 season, he scored a win at Toronto and was running in points until myocarditis forced him out of competing in the Autodrome St. Eustache round, effectively ending his championship hopes.

=== Sports cars ===
Tagliani has competed in sports cars since the mid-2000s. He finished 59th in GRAND-AM Rolex Sports Car Series GT class points in 2007, with a best finish of 13th at Autodromo Hermanos Rodriguez in Mexico City. In 2013, he drove driving a Ferrari GRAND-AM GT in the Rolex Sports Car Series. Later, Rocketsports Racing announced that it had signed Tagliani for the full 2014 United SportsCar Championship season to drive an Oreca FLM09.

== Personal life ==
Tagliani has severe food allergies and suffered several episodes of anaphylaxis. He has promoted public awareness through the Food Allergy Canada and personal sponsor Pfizer.

Tagliani is also an advocate for young go-karting talent and the go-karting hobby around the world, from Briggs to Shifters to KZ. This is reflected in some of his businesses and initiatives, such as Tag E-Karting and Amusement located in Sainte-Thérèse, Quebec.

In 2023, Tagliani discussed his career in the NASCAR Pinty's Series, including experiences racing in Saskatoon and other Canadian venues. He recorded his first victory in Saskatoon in 2022 andlater won at Honda Indy Toronto in 2023, held at Exhibition place in Toronto.

== Motorsports career results ==
=== Career summary ===
Season	Series	Team name	No.	Races	Poles	Wins	Pts	Final placing
1995	Esso Protec F1600 Series	?		?	?	1	?	4th
1996	Atlantic Championship	P-1 Racing	90	12	0	0	70	7th
1997	Atlantic Championship	Forsythe Championship Racing		11	2	2	123	**3rd**
1998	Atlantic Championship	Forsythe Championship Racing		13	3	2	130	5th
1999	Atlantic Championship	Forsythe Championship Racing		12	3	2	118	4th
2000	CART Series	Forsythe Championship Racing	33	20	1	0	53	16th
2001	CART Series	Forsythe Championship Racing	33	20	2	0	80	11th
2002	CART Series	Forsythe Championship Racing	33	19	0	0	111	8th
2003	CART Series	Rocketsports Racing	33	18	2	0	97	10th
2004	Champ Car	Rocketsports Racing	8	14	0	1	218	7th
2005	Champ Car	Team Australia	15	13	0	0	207	7th
2005	V8 Supercars	WPS Racing	8	2	0	0	144	53rd
2006	Champ Car	Team Australia	15	14	0	0	205	8th
2006	Grand-Am Cup			3	0	0	45	59th
2007	Champ Car	RSPORTS	8	12	0	0	70	7th
2007	NASCAR Canadian Tire Series	Jacombs Racing		2	0	0	182	35th
2008	NASCAR Canadian Tire Series	Jacombs Racing		9	0	1	1091	19th
2008	IndyCar Series	Walker Racing	36	4	0	0	56	32nd
2008	IndyCar Series	Conquest Racing	15	4	0	0	56	32nd
2009	IndyCar Series	Conquest Racing	34	6	0	0	114	22nd
2009	NASCAR Nationwide Series	MacDonald Motorsports	81	2	0	0	134	115th
2009	NASCAR Canadian Tire Series	Stockton Racing	3/81	2	2	0	184	40th
2010	IndyCar Series	FAZZT Race Team	77	17	0	0	302	13th
2010	V8 Supercar Championship Series	Kelly Racing	11	2	0	0	72	NC
2011	IndyCar Series	Bryan Herta Autosport	98	16	2	0	296	15th
2011	IndyCar Series	Sam Schmidt Motorsports	77	16	2	0	296	15th
2011	NASCAR Nationwide Series	Penske Racing	12	1	0	0	43	64th
2011	NASCAR Canadian Tire Series	Jacombs Racing	12	2	1	0	307	37th
2011	International V8 Supercar Championship	Kelly Racing	16	2	0	0	120	68th
2012	IndyCar Series	Bryan Herta Autosport	98	14	1	0	272	17th
2012	NASCAR Xfinity Series	Turner Motorsports	30	1	1	0	23	66th
2013	IndyCar Series	Barracuda Racing	98	10	0	0	180	24th
2013	IndyCar Series	Chip Ganassi Racing	10	10	0	0	180	24th
2013	NASCAR Canadian Tire Series	DJK Racing		1	0	0	40	45th
2014	IndyCar Series	Sarah Fisher Hartman Racing	68	1	0	0	28	31st
2014	NASCAR Xfinity Series	Penske Racing	22	2	0	0	82	39th
2014	NASCAR Camping World Truck Series	Brad Keselowski Racing	19	1	1	0	0	103rd
2014	NASCAR Canadian Tire Series	Tagliani AutoSports	18	9	0	0	273	9th
2015	IndyCar Series	A. J. Foyt Enterprises	48	1	0	0	27	37th
2015	NASCAR Xfinity Series	Penske Racing	22	1	1	0	44	55th
2015	NASCAR Camping World Truck Series	Brad Keselowski Racing	29	1	1	0	0	91st
2015	NASCAR Canadian Tire Series	Tagliani AutoSports	18	9	0	1	356	9th
2016	IndyCar Series	A. J. Foyt Enterprises	48	2	0	0	35	31st
2016	NASCAR Xfinity Series	Penske Racing	22	1	1	0	35	56th
2016	NASCAR Canadian Tire Series	Tagliani AutoSports	18	11	1	3	446	**3rd**
2016	24H Series - 991	HRT Performance						
2017	FRD LMP3 Series	Craft-Bamboo Racing						
2024	GT World Challenge America - Pro-Am	Montreal Motorsport Group						
2025	NASCAR Canada Series	Group Theetge	80	5	0	0	172	12th
2026	NASCAR Canada Series	Ed Hakonson Racing; Theetge Motorsports	3/80	14	0	1	455	7th

=== American open-wheel racing results ===
(key)

==== CART/Champ Car ====
Champ Car results
Year	Team	No.	Chassis	Engine	1	2	3	4	5	6	7	8	9	10	11	12	13	14	15	16	17	18	19	20	21	Rank	Points	Ref
2000	Player's	33	Reynard 2Ki	Ford XF	MIA; 9	LBH; 4	**RIO**; 13	MOT; 15	NAZ; 19	MIL; 22	DET; 6	POR; 13	CLE; 16	TOR; 5	MIS; 16	CHI; 9	MOH; 9	ROA; 14	VAN; 18	LS; 23	GAT; 14	HOU; 16	SRF; 22	FON; 6		16th	**53**	
2001	Player's	33	Reynard 2Ki	Ford XF	MTY; 21	LBH; 18	TXS; NH	NAZ; 22	MOT; 22	MIL; 12	DET; 21	POR; 12	CLE; 9	TOR; 2	MIS; 6	CHI; 6	MOH; 7	ROA; 8	**VAN**; 23	LAU; 21	ROC; 14	HOU; 19	LS; 15	SRF; 3	**FON**; 3	11th	**80**	
2002	Player's	33	Reynard 2Ki	Ford XF	MTY; 5	LBH; 16	MOT; 2	MIL; 19	LS; 10	POR; 12	CHI; 7	TOR; 7	CLE; 5	VAN; 7	MOH; 7	ROA; 2	MTL; 11	DEN; 12	ROC; 18	MIA; 4	SRF; 6	FON; 8	MXC; 10			8th	**111**	
2003	Rocketsports Racing	33	Lola B02/00	Ford XFE	STP; 19	MTY; 3	LBH; 10	BRH; 8	LAU; 18	**MIL**; 5	LS; 14	POR; 3	CLE; 8	TOR; 17	VAN; 14	ROA; 3	MOH; 6	**MTL**; 4	DEN; 9	MIA; 13	MXC; 16	SRF; 7	FON; NH			10th	**97**	
2004	Rocketsports Racing	8	Lola B02/00	Ford XFE	LBH; 8	MTY; 5	MIL; 13	POR; 7	CLE; 3	TOR; 7	VAN; 7	ROA; 1	DEN; 10	MTL; 7	LS; 6	LVG; 16	SRF; 19	MXC; 11								7th	**218**^	
2005	Team Australia	15	Lola B02/00	Ford XFE	LBH; 15	MTY; 3	MIL; 10	POR; 18	CLE; 4	TOR; 3	EDM; 7	SJO; 9	DEN; 14	MTL; 5	LVG; 7	SRF; 4	MXC; 8									7th	**207**	
2006	Team Australia	15	Lola B02/00	Ford XFE	LBH; 3	HOU; 11	MTY; 5	MIL; Wth	POR; 11	CLE; 4	TOR; 6	EDM; 12	SJO; 14	DEN; 16	MTL; 7	ROA; 11	SRF; 3	MXC; 5								8th	**205**	
2007	RSPORTS	8	Panoz DP01	Cosworth XFE	LVG; 4	LBH; 5	HOU; 9	POR; 5	CLE; 6	MTT; 8	TOR; 8	EDM; 14	SJO; 15	ROA; 5												10th	**205**	
2007	Rocketsports Racing	8	Panoz DP01	Cosworth XFE											ZOL; 9	ASN; 15	SRF; 7	MXC; 13								10th	**205**	

- ^ New points system implemented in 2004

==== IndyCar Series ====
IndyCar Series results
Year	Team	No.	Chassis	Engine	1	2	3	4	5	6	7	8	9	10	11	12	13	14	15	16	17	18	19	Rank	Points	Ref
2008	Walker Racing	15	Panoz	Cosworth	HMS	STP	MOT^{1}	LBH^{1} 7	KAN	INDY	MIL	TXS	IOW	RIR	WGL	NSH	MOH	EDM	KTY	SNM				32nd	56	
2008	Conquest Racing	36	Dallara	Honda																	DET; 22	CHI; 12	SRF^{2} 4	32nd	56	
2009	Conquest Racing	34	Dallara	Honda	STP; 10	LBH; 10	KAN	INDY; DNQ	MIL	TXS; 14	IOW	RIR	WGL	TOR; 9	EDM; 13	KTY	MOH	SNM	CHI	MOT	HMS			22nd	114	
2009	Conquest Racing	36	Dallara	Honda				INDY; 11																22nd	114	
2010	FAZZT Race Team	77	Dallara	Honda	SAO; 19	STP; 6	ALA; 10	LBH; 21	KAN; 8	INDY; 10	TXS; 18	IOW; 12	WGL; 17	TOR; 17	EDM; 23	MOH; 4*	SNM; 14	CHI; 25	KTY; 15	MOT; 13	HMS; 14			13th	302	
2011	Sam Schmidt Motorsports	77	Dallara	Honda	STP; 6	ALA; 15	LBH; 5	SAO; 19	**INDY**; 28	**TXS**; 4	TXS; 14	MIL; 18	IOW; 16	TOR; 23	EDM; 17	MOH; 6	NHM; 19	SNM; 20	BAL; 7	MOT; 4	KTY			15th	296	
2011	Bryan Herta Autosport	98	Dallara	Honda																		LVS; C^{3}		15th	296	
2012	Bryan Herta Autosport	98	Dallara DW12	Lotus	STP; 15	ALA; 26	LBH; 21	SAO																17th	272	
2012	Bryan Herta Autosport	98	Dallara DW12	Honda					INDY; 12	DET; 10	**TXS**; 9	MIL; 7	IOW; 16	TOR; 10	EDM; 5	MOH; 10	SNM; 9	BAL; 8	FON; 20					17th	272	
2013	Barracuda Racing	98	Dallara DW12	Honda	STP; 10	ALA; 11	LBH; 19	SAO; 12	INDY; 24	DET; 23	DET; 21	TXS; 22	MIL; 23	IOW; 24	POC; 17	TOR; 17	TOR; 10	MOH	SNM	BAL	HOU	HOU		24th	180	
2013	Chip Ganassi Racing	10	Dallara DW12	Honda																			FON; 14	24th	180	
2014	Sarah Fisher Hartman Racing	68	Dallara DW12	Honda	STP	LBH	ALA	IMS	INDY; 13	DET	DET	TXS	HOU	HOU	POC	IOW	TOR	TOR	MOH	MIL	SNM	FON		31st	28	
2015	A. J. Foyt Enterprises	48	Dallara DW12	Honda	STP	NLA	LBH	ALA	IMS	INDY; 17	DET	DET	TXS	TOR	FON	MIL	IOW	MOH	POC	SNM				37th	27	
2016	A. J. Foyt Enterprises	35	Dallara DW12	Honda	STP	PHX	LBH	ALA	IMS; 23	INDY; 17	DET	DET	RDA	IOW	TOR	MOH	POC	TXS	WGL	SNM				31st	35	

^{1} Run on same day.
^{2} Non-points-paying, exhibition race.
^{3} The Las Vegas Indy 300 was abandoned after Dan Wheldon died from injuries sustained in a 15-car crash on lap 11.

Years	Teams	Races	Poles	Wins	Podiums (Non-win)	Top 10s (Non-podium)	Indianapolis 500 wins	Championships
6	6	72	3	0	0	26	0	0

** Podium (Non-win) indicates 2nd or 3rd place finishes.
*** Top 10s (Non-podium) indicates 4th through 10th place finishes.

==== Indianapolis 500 ====
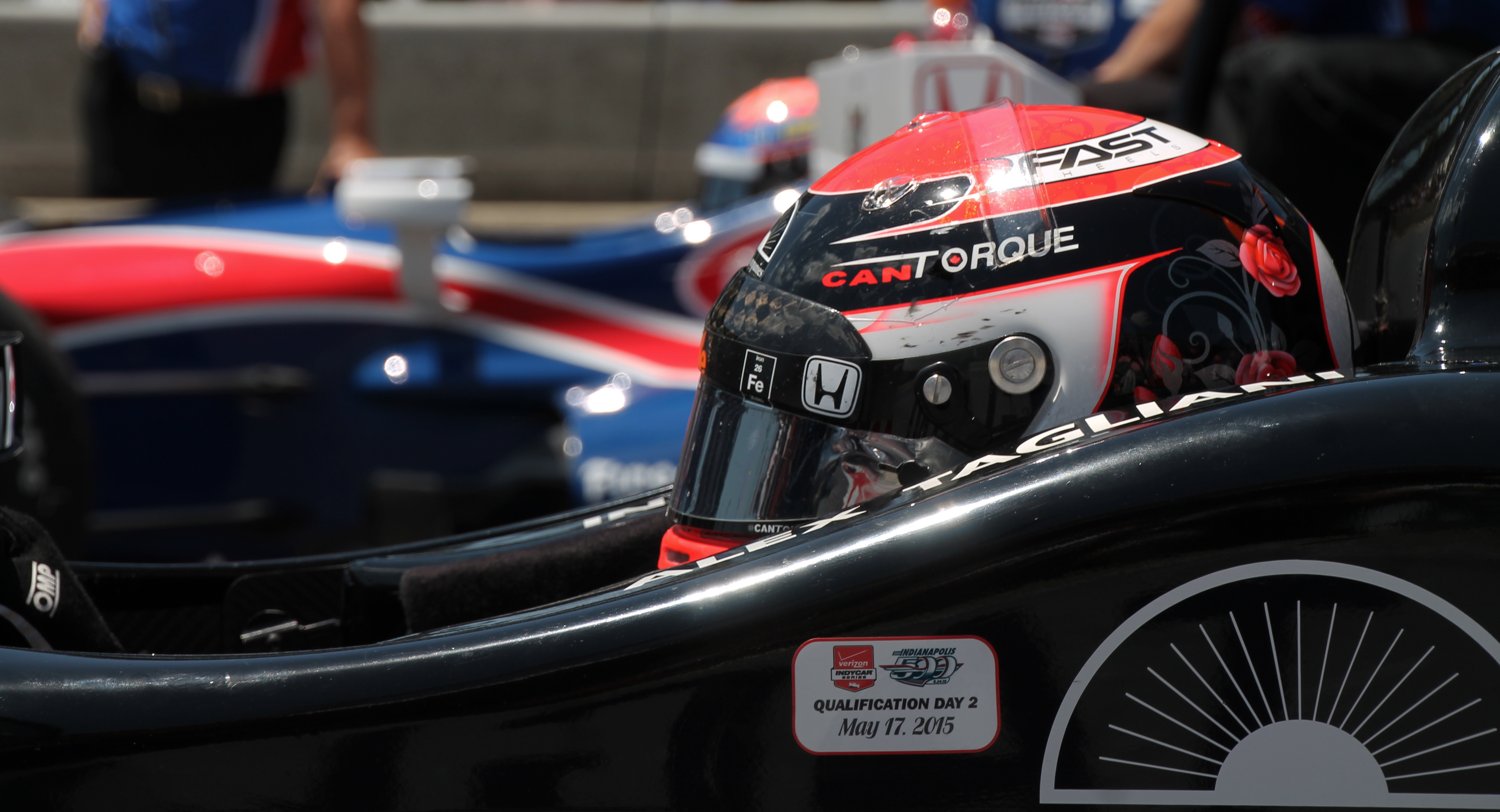
Alex Tagliani participating in the Pit Stop Challenge at the Indianapolis Motor Speedway, 2015

Year	Chassis	Engine	Start	Finish	Team
2009	Dallara	Honda	33	11	Conquest Racing
2010	Dallara	Honda	5	10	FAZZT Race Team
2011	Dallara	Honda	**1**	28	Sam Schmidt Motorsports
2012	Dallara	Honda	11	12	Team Barracuda – BHA
2013	Dallara	Honda	11	24	Barracuda Racing
2014	Dallara	Honda	24	13	Sarah Fisher Hartman Racing
2015	Dallara	Honda	21	17	A. J. Foyt Enterprises
2016	Dallara	Honda	33	17	A. J. Foyt Enterprises

=== NASCAR ===
(key) (Bold – Pole position awarded by qualifying time. Italics – Pole position earned by points standings or practice time. * – Most laps led.)

==== Xfinity Series ====
NASCAR Xfinity Series results
Year	Team	No.	Make	1	2	3	4	5	6	7	8	9	10	11	12	13	14	15	16	17	18	19	20	21	22	23	24	25	26	27	28	29	30	31	32	33	34	35	NXSC	Pts	Ref
2009	MacDonald Motorsports	81	Dodge	DAY	CAL	LVS	BRI	TEX	NSH	PHO	TAL	RCH	DAR	CLT	DOV	NSH	KEN	MLW	NHA	DAY	CHI	GTY	IRP	IOW	GLN	MCH	BRI	CGV; 26	ATL	RCH	DOV	KAN	CAL	CLT	MEM	TEX	PHO; 38	HOM	116th	134	
2011	Penske Racing	12	Dodge	DAY	PHO	LVS	BRI	CAL	TEX	TAL	NSH	RCH	DAR	DOV	IOW	CLT	CHI	MCH	ROA	DAY	KEN	NHA	NSH	IRP	IOW	GLN	CGV; 2	BRI	ATL	RCH	CHI	DOV	KAN	CLT	TEX	PHO	HOM		64th	43	
2012	Turner Motorsports	30	Chevy	DAY	PHO	LVS	BRI	CAL	TEX	RCH	TAL	DAR	IOW	CLT	DOV	MCH	ROA	KEN	DAY	NHA	CHI	IND	IOW	GLN	**CGV**; 22	BRI	ATL	RCH	CHI	KEN	DOV	CLT	KAN	TEX	PHO	HOM			66th	23	
2014	Team Penske	22	Ford	DAY	PHO	LVS	BRI	CAL	TEX	DAR	RCH	TAL	IOW	CLT	DOV	MCH	**ROA**; 2	KEN	DAY	NHA	CHI	IND	IOW	GLN	MOH; 5	BRI	ATL	RCH	CHI	KEN	DOV	KAN	CLT	TEX	PHO	HOM			39th	82	
2015	Team Penske	22	Ford	DAY	ATL	LVS	PHO	CAL	TEX	BRI	RCH	TAL	IOW	CLT	DOV	MCH	CHI	DAY	KEN	NHA	IND	IOW	GLN	**MOH**; 2*	BRI	ROA	DAR	RCH	CHI	KEN	DOV	CLT	KAN	TEX	PHO	HOM			55th	44	
2016	Team Penske	22	Ford	DAY	ATL	LVS	PHO	CAL	TEX	BRI	RCH	TAL	DOV	CLT	POC	MCH	IOW	DAY	KEN	NHA	IND	IOW	GLN	MOH	BRI	**ROA**; 7	DAR	RCH	CHI	KEN	DOV	CLT	KAN	TEX	PHO	HOM			56th	35	

==== Gander RV & Outdoors Truck Series ====
NASCAR Gander RV & Outdoors Truck Series results
Year	Team	No.	Make	1	2	3	4	5	6	7	8	9	10	11	12	13	14	15	16	17	18	19	20	21	22	23	NGTC	Pts	Ref
2014	Brad Keselowski Racing	19	Ford	DAY	MAR	KAN	CLT	DOV	TEX	GTW	KEN	IOW	ELD	POC	MCH	BRI	**MSP**; 16	CHI	NHA	LVS	TAL	MAR	TEX	PHO	HOM		99th	0^{1}	
2015	Brad Keselowski Racing	29	Ford	DAY	ATL	MAR	KAN	CLT	DOV	TEX	GTW	IOW	KEN	ELD	POC	MCH	BRI	**MSP**; 5	CHI	NHA	LVS	TAL	MAR	TEX	PHO	HOM	91st	0^{1}	
2017	Young's Motorsports	02	Chevy	DAY	ATL	MAR	KAN	CLT	DOV	TEX	GTW	IOW	KEN	ELD	POC	MCH	BRI	MSP; 19	CHI	NHA	LVS	TAL	MAR	TEX	PHO	HOM	63rd	18	
2018	Young's Motorsports	12	Chevy	DAY	ATL	LVS	MAR	DOV	KAN	CLT	TEX	IOW	GTW	CHI	KEN	ELD	POC	MCH	BRI	MSP; 10	LVS	TAL	MAR	TEX	PHO	HOM	65th	27	
2019	Kyle Busch Motorsports	51	Toyota	DAY	ATL	LVS	MAR	TEX	DOV	KAN	CLT	TEX	IOW	GTW	CHI	KEN	POC	ELD	MCH	BRI	MSP; 2	LVS	TAL	MAR	PHO	HOM	56th	38	
2020	Kyle Busch Motorsports	51	Toyota	DAY	LVS	CLT	ATL	HOM	POC	KEN	TEX	KAN	KAN	MCH	DAY; 22	DOV	GTW	DAR	RCH	BRI	LVS	TAL	KAN	TEX	MAR	PHO	65th	18	

==== Canada Series ====
NASCAR Canada Series results
Year	Team	No.	Make	1	2	3	4	5	6	7	8	9	10	11	12	13	14	NCSC	Pts	Ref
2007	Jacombs Racing	8	Chevy	HAM	MOS	BAR	MPS	EDM	MTL; 25	MOS	CTR; 23	HAM	BAR2	RIS	KWA			35th	182	
2008	Jacombs Racing	7	Ford	HAM; 20	MOS; 5	BAR; 7	ASE; 24	MPS; 17	EDM; 1*	MTL; 29	MOS; 18	CTR; 18	HAM	BAR	RIS	KWA		19th	1091	
2009	Stockton Racing	03	Chevy	ASE	DEL	MOS	ASE	MPS	EDM	SAS	MOS	**CTR**; 22						40th	184	
2009	Stockton Racing	81	Chevy										**MTL**; 27	BAR	RIS	KWA		40th	184	
2011	Jacombs Racing	12	Dodge	MOS	**ICAR**; 8*	DEL	MOS	TOR	MPS	SAS	CTR	MTL; 5	BAR	RIS	KWA			37th	307	
2013	DJK Racing	28	Dodge	MOS	DEL	MOS	ICAR	MPS	SAS	ASE	**CTR**; 5	RIS	MOS	BAR	KWA			45th	40	
2014	Tagliani AutoSport	18	Dodge	MOS	ACD; 14	ICAR; 5	**EIR**; 13*	SAS; 5	ASE; 12	CTR; 25	RIS	MOS; 20	BAR; 10	KWA; 21				9th	273	
2015	Tagliani AutoSport	18	Chevy	MOS	ACD; 5	SSS; 1*	**ICAR**; 3	EIR; 7	SAS; 7	ASE; 6	CTR; 3	RIS	MOS; 8	KWA; 7				9th	356	
2016	Tagliani AutoSport	18	Chevy	MOS	SSS; 1*	ACD; 3	ICAR; 6	TOR; 1*	EIR; 1*	SAS; 4	CTR; 3	RIS; 9*	**MOS**; 17	ASE; 5	KWA; 8			3rd	446	
2017	Tagliani AutoSport	18	Dodge	MOS; 18	DEL; 2	ACD; 7												6th	477	
2017	22 Racing	18	Dodge				**ICAR**; 5*	TOR; 15	SAS; 20	SAS2; 9	EIR; 4	CTR; 1*	RIS; 6	MOS; 2	ASE; 10	JUK; 6		6th	477	
2018	22 Racing	18	Chevy	MSP; 14	JUK; 3	ACD; 11	**TOR**; 2*	SAS; 3	SAS; 6	EIR; 3	CTR; 1*	RIS; 5	**MSP**; 1*	ASE; 2	NHA; 7	JUK; 13		2nd	516	
2019	22 Racing	18	Chevy	MSP; 11	JUK; 5	ACD; 5	**TOR**; 1*	SAS; 11	SAS; 6	EIR; 8	CTR; 2*	RIS; 2	MSP; 3*	ASE	NHA	JUK		10th	394	
2020	22 Racing	18	Chevy	SUN	SUN	FLA; 4	FLA; 6	JUK; 14	JUK; 5									12th	147	
2021	22 Racing	18	Chevy	SUN; 3	SUN; 9	CTR; 1*	ICAR; 4	MSP; 4	MSP; 2*	FLA; 4	DEL; 14	DEL; 18	DEL; 17					4th	371	
2022	22 Racing	18	Chevy	SUN; 7	MSP; 2	ACD; 5	AVE; 15	TOR; 5	**EDM**; 18	SAS; 7	SAS; 1*	CTR; 4	OSK; 5	ICAR; 7	MSP; 6	DEL; 20		5th	476	
2025	Group Theetge	80	Chevy	MSP; 18	RIS	EIR	SAS	CMP; 6	ACD	CTR; 20	ICAR; 3	MSP; 4	DEL	DEL	AMS			12th	172	
2026	Group Theetge	80	Chevy	MSP; 24						CMP; 1*			CTR; 24	MAR; 16	ICAR; 5	MSP; 10		7th	455	
2026	Ed Hakonson Racing	3	Chevy		ACD; 17	ACD; 17	RIS; 11	AMS; 7	AMS; 8		EIR; 12	EIR; 8					DEL; 9	7th	455	

^{*} Season still in progress
^{1} Ineligible for series points

=== Touring/sports car racing ===
(Races in bold indicate pole position)

==== V8 Supercar results ====
V8 Supercars results
Year	Team	1	2	3	4	5	6	7	8	9	10	11	12	13	14	15	16	17	18	19	20	21	22	23	24	25	26	27	28	Final pos	Points
2005	WPS Team Australia	ADL	PUK	BAR	ECR	SHA	HDV	QUE	ORP	SAN; 22	BAT; 13	SUR	SYP	PHI																54th	144
2010	Rock Racing	YMC; R1	YMC; R2	BHR; R3	BHR; R4	ADE; R5	ADE; R6	HAM; R7	HAM; R8	QLD; R9	QLD; R10	WIN; R11	WIN; R12	HDV; R13	HDV; R14	TOW; R15	TOW; R16	PHI; R17	BAT; R18	SUR; R19; 11	SUR; R20; 20	SYM; R21	SYM; R22	SAN; R23	SAN; R24	SYD; R25	SYD; R26			NC	72 +
2011	Stratco Racing	YMC; R1	YMC; R2	ADE; R3	ADE; R4	HAM; R5	HAM; R6	PER; R7	PER; R8	PER; R9	WIN; R10	WIN; R11	HDV; R12	HDV; R13	TOW; R14	TOW; R15	QLD; R16	QLD; R17	QLD; R18	PHI; R19	BAT; R20	SUR; R21; 19	SUR; R22; 11	SYM; R23	SYM; R24	SAN; R25	SAN; R26	SYD; R27	SYD; R28	68th	120

+ International driver, not eligible for points in 2010 format. Points listed is team points for driver Jason Bargwanna in the two races where Tagliani was co-driver for the #11 Kelly Racing Holden.

== See also ==
- List of Canadians in Champ Car

Awards and achievements
Preceded by Ryan Hunter-Reay	Indianapolis 500; Rookie of the Year; 2009	Succeeded by Simona de Silvestro
