= 2007 Bavaria Champ Car Grand Prix =

(Netherlands) 2007 Dutch Champ Car Grand Prix
Race details
- Race 12 of 14 in the 2007 Champ Car season
- TT Circuit Assen Layout
- Date: September 2, 2007
- Official name: Bavaria Champ Car Grand Prix Presented by Audi, Gant, Hertz, Pioneer and Jumbo
- Location: TT Circuit Assen, Assen, Netherlands
- Course: Permanent Road Course; 2.830 mi / 4.554 km
- Distance: 69 laps 195.270 mi / 314.226 km
- Weather: Mostly Cloudy

Pole position
- Driver: (France) Sébastien Bourdais (N/H/L Racing)
- Time: 1:18.765

Fastest lap
- Driver: (United Kingdom) Dan Clarke (Minardi Team USA)
- Time: 1:20.727 (on lap 66 of 69)

Podium
- First: (United Kingdom) Justin Wilson (RuSPORT)
- Second: (Belgium) Jan Heylen (Conquest Racing)
- Third: (Brazil) Bruno Junqueira (Dale Coyne Racing)

The 2007 Bavaria Champ Car Grand Prix was the twelfth round of the 2007 Champ Car World Series Season. It was held on September 2 at TT Circuit Assen in Assen, Netherlands. The race was won by Justin Wilson. It is the most recent race of the IndyCar Series and its predecessors to have taken place in Europe, until the IndyCar Grand Prix of Barcelona debuts in 2027.

== Background ==
On January 16, 2007 the Champ Car World Series announced a multi-year agreement that briefly saw the return of Champ Car to Europe for the first time since 2003 with inaugural races in the Netherlands and Belgium. These events added to the Champ Car calendar took place August 26 at the Zolder circuit in Belgium and September 2 at the TT Circuit in Assen, Netherlands. This marked the first time that Champ Car has raced in either of the two European nations.

=== Title sponsor ===
On July 12, 2007, at a press conference held in Lieshout, Netherlands, Bart Rietbergen of the Dutch Champ Car Grand Prix, Jos Vaessen, Chairman of TT Circuit Assen, and Peer Swinkels, chairman of the Bavaria Beer company, announced that Bavaria Brewery, the second largest brewer in the Netherlands, would be the title sponsor of the 2007 Grand Prix event. Officials also announced the signing of three associate sponsors of the event; those being Audi, Gant, and Hertz. Promotional events leading up to the Grand Prix included driver appearances and track performances of a Champ Car at the Bavaria City Racing held in Rotterdam and at the Rizla Racing Days weekend at the TT Circuit.

The official name of the event was the "Bavaria Champ Car Grand Prix Powered by Audi, Gant & Hertz."

== Qualifying results ==
| Pos | Nat | Name | Team | Qual 1 | Qual 2 | Best |
|---|---|---|---|---|---|---|
| 1 | (France) | Sébastien Bourdais | N/H/L Racing | 1:32.244 | 1:18.765 | 1:18.765 |
| 2 | (United Kingdom) | Justin Wilson | RuSPORT | 1:30.656 | 1:19.710 | 1:19.710 |
| 3 | (France) | Tristan Gommendy | PKV Racing | 1:31.874 | 1:19.025 | 1:19.025 |
| 4 | (Switzerland) | Neel Jani | PKV Racing | 1:33.043 | 1:19.302 | 1:19.302 |
| 5 | (France) | Simon Pagenaud | Team Australia | 1:31.550 | 1:19.353 | 1:19.353 |
| 6 | (United States) | Graham Rahal | N/H/L Racing | 1:31.858 | 1:19.373 | 1:19.373 |
| 7 | (Belgium) | Jan Heylen | Conquest Racing | 1:33.769 | 1:19.412 | 1:19.412 |
| 8 | (Australia) | Will Power | Team Australia | 1:32.473 | 1:19.415 | 1:19.415 |
| 9 | (Netherlands) | Robert Doornbos | Minardi Team USA | 1:32.343 | 1:19.612 | 1:19.612 |
| 10 | (United Kingdom) | Dan Clarke | Minardi Team USA | 1:33.722 | 1:19.718 | 1:19.718 |
| 11 | (Brazil) | Bruno Junqueira | Dale Coyne Racing | 1:33.299 | 1:19.813 | 1:19.813 |
| 12 | (Canada) | Alex Tagliani | Rocketsports | 1:32.607 | 1:19.934 | 1:19.934 |
| 13 | (Spain) | Oriol Servià | Forsythe Racing | 1:31.900 | 1:20.033 | 1:20.033 |
| 14 | (United Kingdom) | Katherine Legge | Dale Coyne Racing | 1:36.110 | 1:20.548 | 1:20.548 |
| 15 | (United Kingdom) | Ryan Dalziel | Pacific Coast Motorsports | 1:34.136 | 1:20.744 | 1:20.744 |
| 16 | (United States) | Alex Figge | Pacific Coast Motorsports | 1:33.710 | 1:21.039 | 1:21.039 |
| 17 | (Canada) | Paul Tracy | Forsythe Racing | 1:32.719 | 1:22.936 | 1:22.936 |

Sébastien Bourdais won his third consecutive pole position and came closer to clinching his fourth consecutive Champ Car title. Justin Wilson was fastest in the wet on Friday to secure the front row spot beside him. Dan Clarke was reinstated from his suspension by Champ Car race director Tony Cotman, meaning the usual 17 drivers would start the race on Sunday.

== Race ==
| Pos | Nat | Name | Team | Laps | Time/Retired | Grid | Points |
|---|---|---|---|---|---|---|---|
| 1 | (United Kingdom) | Justin Wilson | RuSPORT | 69 | 1:46:02.236 | 2 | 32 |
| 2 | (Belgium) | Jan Heylen | Conquest Racing | 69 | +7.227 | 7 | 27 |
| 3 | (Brazil) | Bruno Junqueira | Dale Coyne Racing | 69 | +8.419 | 11 | 26 |
| 4 | (France) | Tristan Gommendy | PKV Racing | 69 | +9.037 | 3 | 23 |
| 5 | (Switzerland) | Neel Jani | PKV Racing | 69 | +22.262 | 4 | 21 |
| 6 | (France) | Simon Pagenaud | Team Australia | 69 | +22.698 | 5 | 19 |
| 7 | (France) | Sébastien Bourdais | N/H/L Racing | 69 | +22.955 | 1 | 18 |
| 8 | (Spain) | Oriol Servià | Forsythe Racing | 69 | +23.406 | 13 | 15 |
| 9 | (United States) | Graham Rahal | N/H/L Racing | 69 | +23.949 | 6 | 13 |
| 10 | (United Kingdom) | Ryan Dalziel | Pacific Coast Motorsports | 69 | +29.554 | 15 | 11 |
| 11 | (United Kingdom) | Dan Clarke | Minardi Team USA | 69 | +38.903 | 10 | 11 |
| 12 | (United Kingdom) | Katherine Legge | Dale Coyne Racing | 69 | +44.860 | 14 | 9 |
| 13 | (Netherlands) | Robert Doornbos | Minardi Team USA | 69 | +1:00.638 | 9 | 8 |
| 14 | (Australia) | Will Power | Team Australia | 69 | +1:01.204 | 8 | 7 |
| 15 | (Canada) | Alex Tagliani | Rocketsports | 68 | + 1 Lap | 12 | 6 |
| 16 | (United States) | Alex Figge | Pacific Coast Motorsports | 68 | + 1 Lap | 16 | 5 |
| 17 | (Canada) | Paul Tracy | Forsythe Racing | 14 | Mechanical | 17 | 4 |

Starting on the front row beside pole sitter Sébastien Bourdais, Justin Wilson drove into the lead in the first corner. Bourdais then began to lose multiple positions when a software bug in his car's ECU engaged the pit speed limiter when he pressed the power to pass button. He was able to save losing further positions when a spin by Paul Tracy brought out a full course yellow.

Wilson settled into the lead followed by PKV teammates Neel Jani and Tristan Gommendy, Graham Rahal and then Bourdais. Almost unnoticed, Bruno Junqueira pitted under green on lap 8. When a caution came out for debris on lap 14 and the rest of the field pitted for the first time Junqueira took the lead, which he held until he pitted on lap 26.

By this point in the race it was determined that other cars were suffering the same power to pass glitch as Bourdais and Champ Car sent out an edict that all drivers must refrain from using "the button" for the remainder of the race.

A second debris caution brought the field save Junquiera into the pits on lap 31 and once again Junquiera came out of the caution in the lead. After providing Dale Coyne Racing with its best ever finish with a second place the previous week at Zolder, it began to look as if Bruno would follow up with Coyne's first victory as he extended his lead over Wilson.

Junquiera pitted for the final time on lap 49. With a clean pit stop he should have cycled back to the lead when Wilson came in for his final stop on lap 51. However, when the stops were finished he found himself in third behind Wilson and Jan Heylen. It was later determined that on his final stop, his pit lane limiter did not properly activate, causing him to spend eight extra seconds on pit lane. This glitch likely cost him the victory.

As it was, Justin Wilson led the final 20 laps in front of Heylen and Junquiera to take the win. It was Justin's first race win since the 2006 Edmonton Grand Prix. Heylen's second place was his best ever Champ Car result and tied the best ever result for Conquest Racing.

Bourdais' race never really got going after the trouble at the start. He was forced to battle back through the entire field after stalling his car during his second pit stop and dropping back to 16th place. His seventh-place finish wasn't good enough to seal his fourth consecutive Champ Car championship, extending the fading hopes of his competitors for at least one more race.

== Caution flags ==
| Laps | Cause |
|---|---|
| 1-3 | Tracy (3) spin/stall |
| 14-16 | Debris |
| 30-33 | Debris |

== Notes ==
| Laps | Leader |
|---|---|
| 1-15 | Justin Wilson |
| 16-28 | Bruno Junqueira |
| 29-31 | Justin Wilson |
| 32-48 | Bruno Junqueira |
| 49-69 | Justin Wilson |

| Driver | Laps led |
|---|---|
| Justin Wilson | 39 |
| Bruno Junqueira | 30 |

- New Race Record Justin Wilson : 1:46:02.236
- Average Speed 110.491 mph

== Championship standings after the race ==
Drivers' Championship standings

| | Pos | Driver | Points |
|---|---|---|---|
| | 1 | (France) Sébastien Bourdais | 301 |
| 2 | 2 | (United Kingdom) Justin Wilson | 243 |
| 1 | 3 | (Netherlands) Robert Doornbos | 238 |
| 1 | 4 | (Australia) Will Power | 228 |
| | 5 | (United States) Graham Rahal | 209 |

- Note: Only the top five positions are included.

== Attendance ==
Attendance for the 2007 Bavaria Champ Car Grand Prix was 74,900 over the race weekend, with 61,200 fans attending the main race day Sunday event.

| Previous race: 2007 Belgian Champ Car Grand Prix | Champ Car World Series; 2007 season | Next race: 2007 Lexmark Indy 300 |
| Previous race: First Event | 2007 Bavaria Champ Car Grand Prix | Next race: 2008 Netherlands Champ Car Grand Prix of Holland cancelled by IndyCar/Champ Car merger |
