= 2007 Lexmark Indy 300 =

Coordinates: 27°59′17.9″S 153°25′42.1″E

(Australia) 2007 Surfers Paradise
Race details
- Race 13 of 14 in the 2007 Champ Car season
- Track map of the Surfers Paradise street circuit at Surfers Paradise, Australia.
- Date: 21 October, 2007
- Official name: Lexmark Indy 300
- Location: Surfers Paradise Street Circuit; Queensland, Australia
- Course: Temporary Street Circuit; 2.795 mi / 4.498 km
- Distance: 61 laps 170.495 mi / 274.378 km
- Weather: Dry and sunny with temperatures reaching up to 26.2 °C (79.2 °F)

Pole position
- Driver: Will Power (Team Australia)
- Time: 1:30.054

Fastest lap
- Driver: (United States) Graham Rahal (N/H/L Racing)
- Time: 1:31.093 (on lap 59 of 61)

Podium
- First: (France) Sébastien Bourdais (N/H/L Racing)
- Second: (United Kingdom) Justin Wilson (RuSPORT)
- Third: (Brazil) Bruno Junqueira (Dale Coyne Racing)

The 2007 Lexmark Indy 300 was the thirteenth and penultimate round of the 2007 Champ Car World Series Season. It was held on 21 October 2007 on the Surfers Paradise Street Circuit in Queensland, Australia. The race was won by Sébastien Bourdais, who also claimed his fourth consecutive Champ Car title, becoming the first man to achieve that distinction.

== Qualifying results ==
Pos	Nat	Name	Team	Qual 1	Qual 2	Best
1	(Australia)	Will Power	Team Australia	1:30.895	1:30.054	1:30.054
2	(Spain)	Oriol Servià	PKV Racing	1:30.862	1:30.693	1:30.693
3	(Canada)	Paul Tracy	Forsythe Racing	1:31.820	1:30.426	1:30.426
4	(France)	Sébastien Bourdais	N/H/L Racing	1:32.883	1:30.438	1:30.438
5	(United Kingdom)	Justin Wilson	RuSPORT	1:31.365	1:30.586	1:30.586
6	(France)	Simon Pagenaud	Team Australia	1:33.018	1:31.038	1:31.038
7	(Brazil)	Bruno Junqueira	Dale Coyne Racing	1:32.875	1:31.212	1:31.212
8	(Switzerland)	Neel Jani	PKV Racing	1:32.520	1:31.281	1:31.281
9	(United States)	Graham Rahal	N/H/L Racing	1:34.049	1:31.347	1:31.347
10	(United Kingdom)	Dan Clarke	Minardi Team USA	1:33.866	1:31.413	1:31.413
11	(Canada)	Alex Tagliani	Rocketsports Racing	3:20.825	1:31.664	1:31.664
12	(Mexico)	Mario Domínguez	Pacific Coast Motorsports	4:27.161	1:31.746	1:31.746
13	(France)	Nelson Philippe	Conquest Racing	1:33.187	1:31.842	1:31.842
14	(Netherlands)	Robert Doornbos	PKV Racing	1:32.675	1:31.969	1:31.969
15	(United States)	Alex Figge	Pacific Coast Motorsports	1:44.381	1:32.458	1:32.458
16	(United Kingdom)	Katherine Legge	Dale Coyne Racing	1:33.986	1:32.694	1:32.694
17	(Mexico)	David Martínez	Forsythe Racing	1:35.578	1:33.892	1:33.892

Oriol Servià, driving a car for PKV this weekend, nipped local hero Will Power on Friday, snagging the provisional pole position by .033 seconds and locking in a front row starting spot for Sunday's race. Power got revenge on Saturday when he broke the Surfers Paradise track record in winning his fourth pole position of the season by .372 seconds.

== Race ==
Will Power led away from the standing start, continuing to show the unmatched speed he showed in qualifying on Saturday. But the Australian's race would quickly end in tears. After debris brought out a caution flag on lap 9, Power led the front-runners into the pits for the first stop of the day. The lollipop man released Power back into the pit lane just as David Martínez was entering the pit stall in front of him. Power ran into the back of Martínez's car, damaging his right front suspension. Power was forced to return to the pits for repairs, leaving him at the back of the field. Power's day ended for good on lap 19 when he clouted Katherine Legge while trying to pass her, leaving him with a broken car and a very sore wrist.

As is often the case in Champ Car races, the early debris caution led to three drivers rolling the dice on strategy. Paul Tracy (who spun on lap 1), Bruno Junqueira (who had stalled on the grid), and Robert Doornbos (who had a lousy qualifying) stayed out rather than pit. Doornbos led until he pitted on lap 18, with Paul Tracy leading for a lap until he drove for the pits on lap 19.

Sébastien Bourdais inherited the lead from Tracy. Bourdais had jumped around Oriol Servià in the first pit stop. Servià took the lead when Bourdais pitted on lap 32, who in turn gave up the lead on lap later to Paul Tracy, who was now leading the alternate strategy cars.

Bourdais was running in second behind Tracy until a rare event happened on lap 39, he was passed on the track by Justin Wilson. So when Tracy pitted on lap 40 Wilson took over the lead. Both Wilson and Bourdais had one more pit stop to make. Wilson stopped first on lap 44, but Bourdais extended his stop until lap 48, setting down some scorching laps on low tanks in the meantime. Bourdais easily came out in front of Wilson after completing his final pit stop.

With first and second places pretty much decided, an interesting battle was shaping up between alternate strategy runners Tracy and Junqueira for the final podium spot. Tracy was looking to redeem a rough patch of races while Junqueira was looking for his third consecutive podium finish. Unfortunately for Tracy, he used too much fuel to stay ahead and had to dive to the pits for fuel on the white flag lap. To add insult to injury he stalled the car and ended the race in ninth, the last lead lap runner.

With the victory, Bourdais clinched his fourth consecutive Champ Car title, a feat that has never been done before. He also became the first man to repeat as winner in the 17-year history of the Surfers Paradise event.

== Race result ==
Pos	No	Driver	Team	Laps	Time/retired	Grid	Points
1	1	(France) Sébastien Bourdais	N/H/L Racing	61	1:45:49.318	4	31
2	9	(United Kingdom) Justin Wilson	RuSPORT	61	+6.776	5	27
3	19	(Brazil) Bruno Junqueira	Dale Coyne Racing	61	+50.896	7	25
4	14	(Netherlands) Robert Doornbos	Minardi Team USA	61	+1:02.641	14	24
5	15	(France) Simon Pagenaud	Team Australia	61	+1:03.411	6	21
6	34	(France) Nelson Philippe	Conquest Racing	61	+1:09.011	13	19
7	8	(Canada) Alex Tagliani	Rocketsports Racing	61	+1:12.291	11	17
8	21	(Switzerland) Neel Jani	PKV Racing	61	+1:29.789	8	15
9	3	(Canada) Paul Tracy	Forsythe Racing	61	+1:48.614	3	13
10	7	(Mexico) David Martínez	Forsythe Racing	60	+ 1 lap	17	11
11	2	(United States) Graham Rahal	N/H/L Racing	60	+ 1 lap	9	11
12	28	(Mexico) Mario Domínguez	Pacific Coast Motorsports	59	+ 2 laps	12	9
13	29	(United States) Alex Figge	Pacific Coast Motorsports	59	+ 2 laps	15	8
14	22	(Spain) Oriol Servià	PKV Racing	58	+ 3 laps	2	8
15	11	(United Kingdom) Katherine Legge	Dale Coyne Racing	57	Engine	16	6
16	5	(Australia) Will Power	Team Australia	18	Collision	1	6
17	4	(United Kingdom) Dan Clarke	Minardi Team USA	12	Accident	10	4

== Caution flags ==
Laps	Cause
9-11	Debris
13-15	Figge (29) spin/stall
19-22	Power (5) & Legge (11) contact

== Notes ==
Laps	Leader
1-10	Will Power
11-18	Robert Doornbos
19	Paul Tracy
20-31	Sébastien Bourdais
32-33	Oriol Servià
34-39	Paul Tracy
40-43	Justin Wilson
44-61	Sébastien Bourdais

Driver	Laps led
Sébastien Bourdais	30
Will Power	10
Robert Doornbos	8
Paul Tracy	7
Justin Wilson	4
Oriol Servià	2

- New Track Record Will Power 1:30.054 (Qualification Session #2)
- New Lap Record Graham Rahal 1:31.093
- New Race Record Sébastien Bourdais 1:45:49.318
- Average Speed 96.669 mph

== Championship standings after the race ==
- Bold indicates the Season Champion.

Drivers' Championship standings

Pos	Driver	Points
1	(France) **Sébastien Bourdais**	332
2	(United Kingdom) Justin Wilson	270
3	(Netherlands) Robert Doornbos	262
4	(Australia) Will Power	234
5	(United States) Graham Rahal	220

- Note: Only the top five positions are included.

Previous race: 2007 Bavaria Champ Car Grand Prix of Holland	Champ Car World Series; 2007 season	Next race: 2007 Gran Premio Tecate
Previous race: 2006 Lexmark Indy 300	2007 Lexmark Indy 300	Next race: 2008 Nikon Indy 300; IndyCar Series event
