= Derrick Walker =

British racing team owner

Derrick Walker (born 8 April 1945 in Leven, Scotland) is a former British auto racing team owner. In May 2013 Walker became President of operations and competition of IndyCar until the finalization of the 2015 IndyCar season.

== Formula One ==
He started in auto racing as a chief mechanic for the Brabham Formula One team from 1970 to 1975.

== Penske and IndyCars ==
When Penske left F1, Penske hired Walker as a mechanic. He stayed with Penske in some capacity until 1987. From 1977 until 1980 he was the general manager of Penske Cars' manufacturing facility in Poole, England. He became Penske's Vice President of racing, and watched the team win four PPG Cups (series championships) and four Indianapolis 500 races. Some of the most successful American drivers came through the Penske program during that period, including Rick Mears, Bobby Unser, Al Unser Sr. and Danny Sullivan.

== Porsche and team ownership ==
In 1988 the lone Porsche Indy Car team suffered a tragic loss with the death of team owner Al Holbert. Walker took over team management. With driver Teo Fabi, they won the Mid-Ohio Sports Car Course, the only one in the storied marque's Indy Car career. When the team went under, Walker purchased their assets, renamed Walker Motorsports.

Walker ran Willy T. Ribbs sporadically until 1994, but enjoyed his best success in the early seasons with Scott Goodyear. Goodyear came second to Al Unser Jr. in the 1992 Indianapolis 500 by 0.043 seconds, the closest finish to date in the race's history, and later won the 1992 Michigan 500 for Walker over then-Penske newcomer Paul Tracy. Goodyear and Robby Gordon spent large amounts of time with Walker, with 1996 their last season. Gordon left to pursue a further NASCAR career with Goodyear in the new Indy Racing League. Walker hired Gil de Ferran, who came close to winning the 1997 title without winning a single race. He ran a second car for Naoki Hattori and Memo Gidley in 1999 but neither did well. Walker also ran a team in the Indy Racing League for Sarah Fisher in 2000 and 2001 with limited success.

In 2000 Goodyear, Walker's tire supplier, pulled out of Indy Car racing and moved with de Ferran off to Penske. Walker was forced to hire a pay-driver and found one in F1 refugee Shinji Nakano. Nakano did a fair job, placing better than was expected despite missing a couple of races due to a testing accident. Bryan Herta filled in but was unavailable to run full-time in 2001. Walker hired another Japanese ex-F1 driver in Toranosuke Takagi, who brought sponsorship from Pioneer. Takagi stayed two seasons with Rodolfo Lavin and Darren Manning, running out-dated Reynard chassis in 2003. The team ran a third car for Luis Diaz at Mexico City. Manning scored the team's best result of the year, finishing 2nd in a bizarre race at Surfers Paradise. Unfortunately he left for Chip Ganassi Racing and Walker downsized to one car, running a lone Reynard for Mario Haberfeld.

== Team Australia ==
Following the 2004 season, Walker sold a share of the team to Australian businessmen Craig Gore and John Fish, rebranding the team as Team Australia. The team signed Alex Tagliani and Marcus Marshall to run Aussie Vineyards-sponsored Lola chassis for the 2005 season, with Walker remaining at the helm. In late 2005 Will Power was drafted in place of Marshall, with the Power/Tagliani combination proving a solid one as the team rises with the added stability and increased funding under the Team Australia relationship.

In 2006 Team Australia established a Champ Car Atlantic Championship team for drivers James Davison and Simon Pagenaud. Walker is also co-owner of Formula BMW USA team Walker Haberfeld Racing, with former Walker driver Mario Haberfeld for drivers Marco Santos and David Rangel.

On 7 April 2007, Walker won his first race as a team owner since 1999. Team Australia's Will Power won the inaugural Las Vegas GP.

== Ed Carpenter Racing ==
In 2012, Derrick Walker returned to the IndyCar Series as team manager for Ed Carpenter Racing, co-owned by Tony George and driver Ed Carpenter. The team is based in the Walker Racing facility and utilizes Walker Racing's equipment and personnel.
