= Team Australia =

Auto racing team

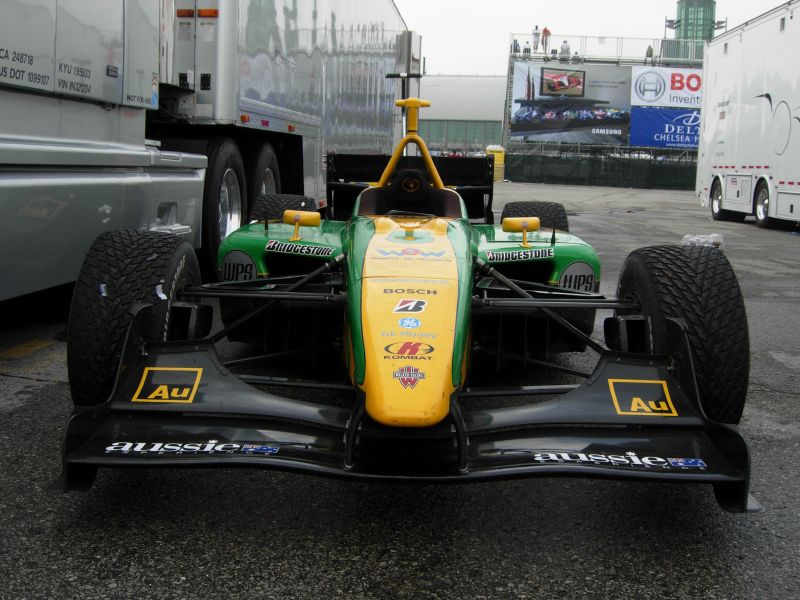
- Founded: 2005
- Founder(s): Craig Gore; John Fish
- Folded: 2008
- Former series: V8 Supercars; Champ Car World Series; Champ Car Atlantic Series
- Noted drivers: (Australia) Will Power (Australia) Owen Kelly (Malaysia) Alex Yoong (Canada) Alex Tagliani (France) Simon Pagenaud (Switzerland) Simona de Silvestro
- Drivers' Championships: Champ Car Atlantic Series: 2006: Simon Pagenaud

Team Australia was an auto racing team competing in the V8 Supercars and Champ Car World Series. It was created in early 2005 when two Australian businessmen Craig Gore and John Fish bought into Derrick Walker's Walker Racing operation. After the 2007 the operation was scaled back to just Will Power who joined KV Racing, before ending entirely a year later.

== Origins ==
After sponsoring young Australian driver Josh Hunt in the Toyota Atlantic Championship, Australian millionaire Craig Gore began to investigate fielding a Champ Car team. His empire already included a V8 Supercar team competing in Australia, and at the 2004 Surfers Paradise round of the CCWS, on the Gold Coast, Australia, Gore's V8 driver David Besnard made his debut with a WPS sponsored Walker Racing Champ Car. He finished a creditable 7th place, and the seeds were sewn for Gore's assault on the Champ Car series.

In late 2004 and early 2005 Gore, his associate John Fish and long time Champ Car World Series team owner Derrick Walker, created the Team Australia race program. Obsolete Reynard chassis were replaced with bespoke Lola units, and the team signed Canadian Champ Car veteran Alex Tagliani and Australian Formula 3 driver Marcus Marshall for the 2005 season.

== Champ Car Series ==
=== 2005 ===
With a new chassis to learn, Team Australia was hardly going to upset the establishment in 2005. However, Tagliani's consistent, solid drives took the team to many top-ten finishes and several podiums through the year. Tagliani finished the season in seventh place, equaling his career best finish. Marshall, by contrast, was unspectacular, struggling to break the top ten. By Team Australia's homecoming at the 2005 Surfer's Paradise race, they had announced that a third car would be run for Australian international driver Will Power. Power outpaced both teammates before a collision with Tagliani took him out of the race. Amongst some controversy it was announced that Marshall's contract had been cut, and he was to leave the team. His attempt to appeal this in court was unsuccessful, and he was dropped in favour of Power, who signed a three-year contract. The team ran their third car again in the season finale at Mexico, where newly crowned Atlantics champion Dutchman Charles Zwolsman made his debut.

=== 2006 ===
Rumours that Ryan Briscoe would be taking the #15 car were crushed when Tagliani re-signed prior to Long Beach. In 2006, Team Australia's commitment extended not only to two Champ Cars, but a two-car Atlantic squad, all aimed at fostering young talent. The team showed fantastic pace at the opening round at Long Beach, with Tagliani and Power running third and fourth respectively before a forced error dropped him down the order. He then suffered from brake problems but finished a competitive 9th, while Tagliani took a podium.

The team had consistent top-ten finishes, never really achieving more until Will Power took a pole position at his home race at Surfer's Paradise. He led the race comfortably until Sébastien Bourdais made a move on Power which damaged both cars. Power finished well down the order, but made up for it with a podium at the season finale in Mexico. He also won the Roshfrans Rookie of the Year title, as well as the Bridgestone Passion for Excellence award, the first driver other than Bourdais to win it.

== NASCAR Craftsman Truck Series ==
Craig Gore expanded the Team Australia stable of global motorsport interests with a partnership with Wood Brothers/JTG Racing that included the naming-rights sponsorship of Marcos Ambrose's entry in the NASCAR Craftsman Truck Series in 2006.

The sponsorship was weaved into a nationwide marketing campaign designed to promote quality Australian and Australian-themed products and Australia as a tourism destination. The new green and gold Ford F-150 truck carried Team Australia, Aussie Vineyards and R. M. Williams signage.

Driving the #20 Aussie Vineyards Ford F-150, Ambrose had best finishes of 3rd in Kansas and Nashville and took the pole position in Kentucky.

== Atlantic series ==
In their first year of Atlantic, the team won their first title, with young French driver Simon Pagenaud. He was partnered by James Davison initially, until the underperforming Australian was dropped in favour of countrymate Michael Patrizi.

== Team details ==
The team gained most of its sponsorship from the businesses of Gore and Fish. Gore's financial company, Wright Patton Shakespeare, features on the sides and nosecone of the cars, Fish Liquor are sponsors and their wine business Aussie Vineyards was the title sponsor. The team was also sponsored by the Queensland State Government, Visa credit cards, R. M. Williams, and Qantas. The relationship ended in early 2008 and Gore, Fish and Walker are no longer directly involved, with Walker announcing that Walker Racing will not contest the unified 2008 IRL season. Gore has taken driver Will Power and the Team Australia name to KV Racing.

=== Drivers who have driven for Team Australia ===
IndyCar (2008) (KV Racing)

- (Australia) Will Power (2008)

Champ Car (2005–2007) (Walker Racing)

- (Australia) David Besnard (2004)
- (Canada) Alex Tagliani (2005–2006)
- (Australia) Marcus Marshall (2005)
- (Australia) Will Power (2005–2007)
- (Netherlands) Charles Zwolsman (2005)
- (France) Simon Pagenaud (2007)

V8 Supercars (2004–2007) (WPS Racing)

- (Australia) David Besnard (2004–2006)
- (Australia) Mark Noske (2004)
- (Australia) Owen Kelly (2004)
- (Malaysia) Alex Yoong (2004)
- (Australia) Charlie O'Brien (2004)
- (Australia) Neil McFadyen (2004)
- (New Zealand) John McIntyre (2004)
- (Australia) Marcus Marshall (2005)
- (Canada) Alex Tagliani (2005)
- (New Zealand) Craig Baird (2005–2006)
- (Brazil) Max Wilson (2006–2007)
- (Australia) Jason Bargwanna (2006–2007)
- (Australia) Michael Caruso (2007)
- (Australia) Grant Denyer (2007)

Champ Car Atlantics (2006–2007) (Walker Racing)

- (France) Simon Pagenaud (2006)
- (Australia) James Davison (2006)
- (Australia) Michael Patrizi (2006)
- (United Kingdom) Ryan Lewis (2007)
- (Switzerland) Simona de Silvestro (2007)

NASCAR Craftsman Truck Series (2006) (Wood Brothers/JTG Racing)

- (Australia) Marcos Ambrose (2006)

NASCAR Busch Series (2007) (Wood Brothers/JTG Racing)

- (Australia) Marcos Ambrose (2007)

== Complete motorsport results ==
=== V8 Supercar ===
(key) (Results in bold indicate pole position, results in italics indicate fastest lap)

Year	Drivers	1	2	3	4	5	6	7	8	9	10	11	12	13	14	Pos	Pts
2004		(Australia); ADL	(Australia); ECR	(New Zealand); PUK	(Australia); HDV	(Australia); BAR	(Australia); QUE	(Australia); WIN	(Australia); ORP	(Australia); SAN	(Australia); BAT	(Australia); SUR	(Australia); SYP	(Australia); ECR			
2004	(Australia) Besnard	13	17	25	29	30	19	32	31	16	Ret		12	13		**30th**	790
2004	(Australia) Noske				28	20	20	21	30							**35th**	304
2004	(Australia) O'Brien									16						**60th**	132
2004	(New Zealand) McIntyre									21	Ret	18				**46th**	199
2004	(Malaysia) Yoong									21	15	28				**36th**	278
2004	(Australia) McFadyen										15					**43rd**	226
2004	(Australia) Kelly												21	33		**44th**	214
2005		(Australia); ADL	(New Zealand); PUK	(Australia); BAR	(Australia); ECR	(China); SHA	(Australia); HDV	(Australia); QUE	(Australia); ORP	(Australia); SAN	(Australia); BAT	(Australia); SUR	(Australia); SYP	(Australia); PHI			
2005	(Australia) Besnard	23	32	16	29	32	32	13	16	19	8	21	29	27		**25th**	904
2005	(New Zealand) Baird	28	28	19	15	20	23	16	33	19	8	14	23	31		**23rd**	980
2005	(Canada) Tagliani									22	13					**54th**	144
2005	(Australia) Marshall									22	13					**53rd**	144
2006		(Australia); ADL	(New Zealand); PUK	(Australia); BAR	(Australia); WIN	(Australia); HDV	(Australia); QUE	(Australia); ORP	(Australia); SAN	(Australia); BAT	(Australia); SUR	(Australia); SYP	(Bahrain); BAH	(Australia); PHI			
2006	(Brazil) Wilson	9	22	23	10	17	12	29	11	14	17	13	16	17		**15th**	2038
2006	(Australia) Bargwanna	25	14	17	24	10	26	7	7	10	8	15	22	10		**14th**	2053
2006	(Australia) Besnard								11	14						**45th**	220
2006	(New Zealand) Baird								7	10						**38th**	287
2007		(Australia); ADL	(Australia); BAR	(New Zealand); PUK	(Australia); WIN	(Australia); ECR	(Australia); HDV	(Australia); QUE	(Australia); ORP	(Australia); SAN	(Australia); BAT	(Australia); SUR	(Bahrain); BAH	(Australia); SYP	(Australia); PHI		
2007	(Brazil) Wilson	26	18	15	18	23	13	19	13	Ret	7	10	25	24	19	**17th**	110
2007	(Australia) Bargwanna	19	25	30	20	15	18	22	21	Ret	7	11	10	29	21	**18th**	109
2007	(Australia) Caruso									Ret	15					**49th***	6
2007	(Australia) Denyer									Ret	15					**50th**	6

=== Champ Car Atlantic Championship ===
(key) (Results in bold indicate pole position, results in italics indicate fastest lap)

Year	Car	Drivers	No.	1	2	3	4	5	6	7	8	9	10	11	12	D.C.	Points
2006	Swift-Mazda Cosworth			LBH	HOU	MTY	POR	CLE1	CLE2	TOR	EDM	SJO	DEN	MTL	ROA		
2006	Swift-Mazda Cosworth	(Australia) James Davison	5	13	10	21	25	13	13	12	13	7	22			17th	69
2006	Swift-Mazda Cosworth	(Australia) Michael Patrizi	5											8	15	25th	21
2006	Swift-Mazda Cosworth	(France) Simon Pagenaud	15	4	2	2	23	2	**5**	4	1	9	3	2	17	**1st**	**258**
2007	Swift-Mazda Cosworth			LVG	LBH	HOU	POR1	POR2	CLE	MTT	TOR	EDM1	EDM2	SJO	ROA		
2007	Swift-Mazda Cosworth	(Switzerland) Simona de Silvestro	5	17	28	15	16	16	11	7	18	13	22	10	22	19th	69
2007	Swift-Mazda Cosworth	(United Kingdom) Ryan Lewis	15	Wth	25	27	3	5	21	13	5	9	13	23	10	12th	107

=== Champ Car World Series ===
(key) (Results in bold indicate pole position, results in italics indicate fastest lap)

Year	Chassis	Engine	Drivers	No.	1	2	3	4	5	6	7	8	9	10	11	12	13	14	D.C.	Points
2005					LBH	MTY	MIL	POR	CLE	TOR	EDM	SJO	DEN	MTL	LSV	SRF	MXC			
2005	Lola B02/00	Ford XFE V8 t	(Canada) Alex Tagliani	15	15	3	10	18	4	3	7	9	14	5	7	4	8		7th	207
2005	Lola B02/00	Ford XFE V8 t	(Australia) Marcus Marshall	5	14	16	13	14	12	14	8	12	12	16	9	11			16th	104
2005	Lola B02/00	Ford XFE V8 t	(Australia) Will Power	5													10		22nd	17
2005	Lola B02/00	Ford XFE V8 t	(Australia) Will Power	25												15			22nd	17
2005	Lola B02/00	Ford XFE V8 t	(Netherlands) Charles Zwolsman Jr.	25													13		27th	8
2006					LBH	HOU	MTY	MIL	POR	CLE	TOR	EDM	SJO	DEN	MTL	ROA	SRF	MXC		
2006	Lola B02/00	Ford XFE V8 t	(Australia) Will Power	5	9	7	11	11	18	9	7	6	6	4	5	13	**12**	3	6th	213
2006	Lola B02/00	Ford XFE V8 t	(Canada) Alex Tagliani	15	3	11	5	Wth	11	4	6	12	14	16	7	11	3	5	8th	205
2007					LSV	LBH	HOU	POR	CLE	MTT	TOR	EDM	SJO	ROA	ZOL	ASN	SFR	MXC		
2007	Panoz DP01	Cosworth XFE V8 t	(Australia) Will Power	5	**1***	3	**11**	4	10*	3	1	**15**	4	16	4	14	**16**	**2**	4th	262
2007	Panoz DP01	Cosworth XFE V8 t	(France) Simon Pagenaud	15	12	14	5	8	5	4	4	4	10	11	12	6	5	6	8th	232

=== NASCAR ===
(key) (Bold – Pole position awarded by qualifying time. Italics – Pole position earned by points standings or practice time. * – Most laps led.)

==== Craftsman Truck Series ====
NASCAR Craftsman Truck Series results
Season	Driver	No.	Make	1	2	3	4	5	6	7	8	9	10	11	12	13	14	15	16	17	18	19	20	21	22	23	24	25	NCTC	Pts
2006	(Australia) Ambrose	20	Ford	DAY	CAL	ATL	MAR; 33	GTY; 34	CLT; 36	MFD; 23	DOV; 26	TEX; 27	MCH; 26	MLW; 18	KAN; 3	**KEN**; 19	MEM; 34	IRP; 22	NSH; 3	BRI; 26	NHA; 23	LVS; 7	TAL; 17	MAR; 25	ATL; 16	TEX; 10	PHO; 15	HOM; 27	21st	2228

==== Busch Series ====
NASCAR Busch Series results
Season	Driver	No.	Make	1	2	3	4	5	6	7	8	9	10	11	12	13	14	15	16	17	18	19	20	21	22	23	24	25	26	27	28	29	30	31	32	33	34	35	NBSC	Pts
2007	(Australia) Ambrose	59	Ford	DAY; 16	CAL; 25	MXC; 8	LVS; 10	ATL; 28	BRI; 28	NSH; 17	TEX; 31	PHO; 22	TAL; 25	RCH; 26	DAR; 19	CLT; 20	DOV; 6	NSH; 36	KEN; 11	MLW; 15	NHA; 30	DAY; 35	CHI; 37	GTY; 18	IRP; 32	CGV; 7	GLN; 13	MCH; 19	BRI; 37	CAL; 13	RCH; 15	DOV; 20	KAN; 39	CLT; 40	**MEM**; 4	TEX; 30	PHO; 15	HOM; 10	8th	3477

=== Overall stats ===
Series	Seasons	Races	Poles	Wins	Podiums (Non-win)	Point Finishes (Non-podium)	Total points	Championships	Best finish (Championship)
**Champ Car**	4	69	3	2	7	47	1,054	0	**6th (2006)**
**Champ Car Atlantic**	2	35	1	1	5	17	473	1	**1st (2006)**
**NASCAR Truck**	1	22	1	0	2	18	2,228	0	**21st (2006)**
**NASCAR Busch**	1	20	0	0	0	17	1,939	0	**N/A**
