= Hope Harbour =

Harbour on West Falkland, Falkland Islands

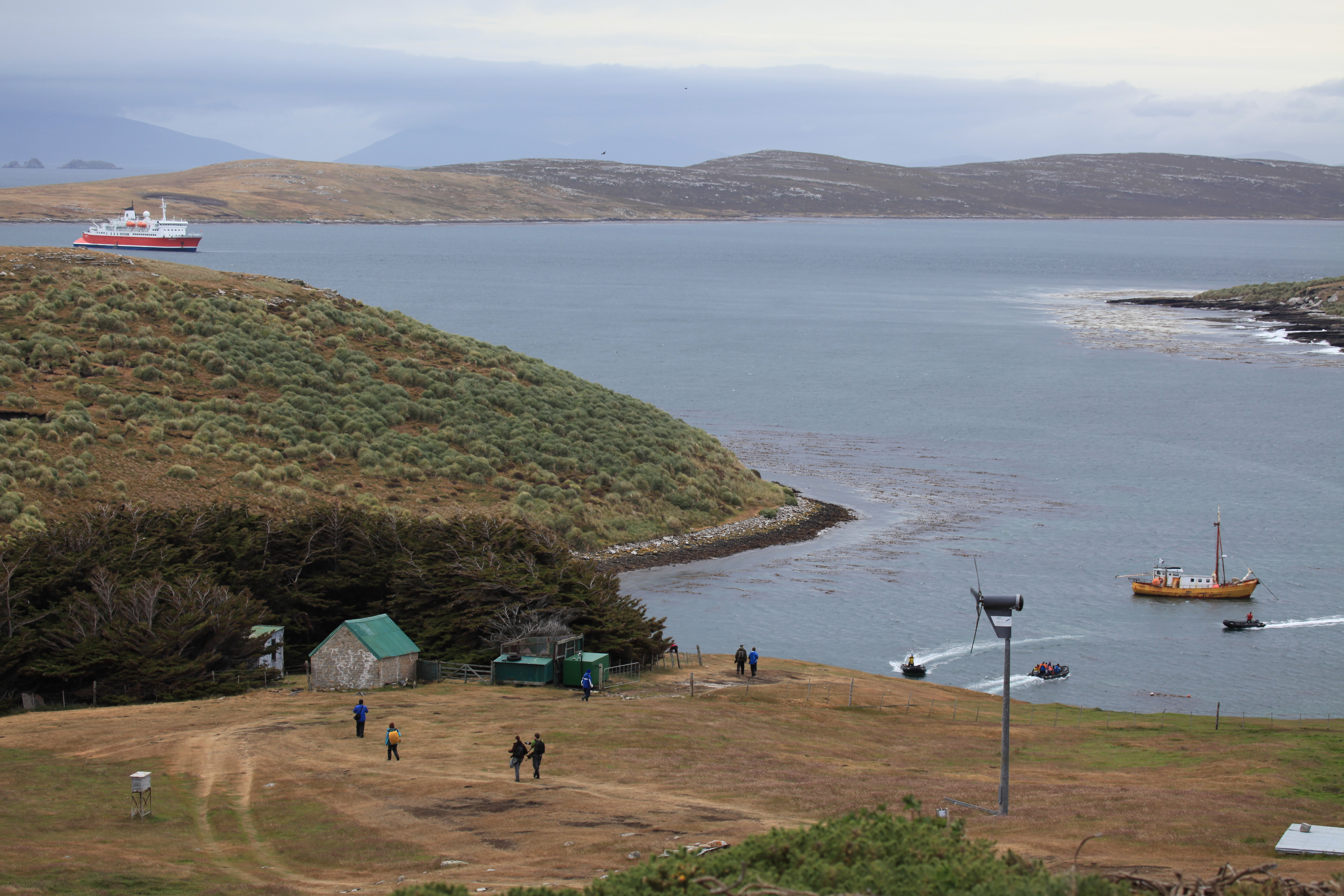
View towards Hope Harbour, looking east from West Point Island

Hope Harbour is an inlet at the north-west of West Falkland in the Falkland Islands of the South Atlantic Ocean at 51°21′13″S 60°38′30″W. About 4 kilometres (2 mi) long and 1.3 kilometres (1 mi) wide, it is sheltered by the promontory of Grave Cove Camp in the south, a narrow ridge terminating in Hope Point to the north, Bramble Point Camp to the east, and West Point Island at its entrance to the west. Carcass Island lies 8 kilometres (5 mi) north-east of Hope Point. The water in the harbour is around 4 fathoms (7.3 m) deep, and a small stream feeds the head of the harbour (at the eastern end) which has attracted mullet.

== Important Bird Area ==
The inlet and its surrounds have been identified by BirdLife International as an Important Bird Area (IBA) under the code FK)19. Birds for which the site is of conservation significance include Falkland steamer ducks, ruddy-headed geese, gentoo penguins, western rockhopper penguins, Magellanic penguins, black-browed albatrosses, and white-bridled finches. Upland geese and long-tailed meadowlarks have been recorded. The area has been overgrazed in the past, with little remaining tussac cover, and suffering from soil erosion, whilst the albatrosses nesting sites on the cliffs are threatened from cliff erosion. The gentoo penguins at Hope Harbour suffer from predation by skuas, which take the young chicks, striated caracara which take eggs, and sea lions which will take adults or chicks alike.

In the 1920s, phoenicopterus chilensis (Chilean flamingos) were spotted in the harbour, and although an occasional visitor, sightings of cattle egrets increased in the 1980s.
