= Craig Gore (businessman) =

Craig Gore Businessman

Craig Gore is an entrepreneur and bankrupt from Sydney, Australia.

== Career ==
In late 1996 Gore meet partner, Sydney accountant John Atkinson, and established a home loan company called Right Home Loans. This business later became known as Wright Patton Shakespeare Financial Services Group. Known as WPS, the business grew into one of Australia's largest independent financial Services companies, with more than 400 employees and licence holders Australia wide. WPS established offices in Sydney, Melbourne, Brisbane, Adelaide and Perth. Gore, as one of the founders and former owner of the Australian Financial Planning chain "WPS", sold his interest in WPS to British Author Lord Michael Ashcroft for $160M AUD.

=== WPSFSG ===
Shane Stone served as Chairman of WPSFSG for two years before Gore merged his companies with an Ashcroft Entity creating a new company,International Marina Development and Management Pty Ltd, with a focus on purchasing marina developments. Stone served as chairman of the merged group. This company made a number of acquisitions in a slowing economy, these included Hope Harbour Marina, The Townsville Ocean Terminal and Breakwater Marina in Townsville. The sale of WPSFG and other assets to Ashcroft entities was later to become central to a dispute between Gore and Ashcroft and the focus of the Insolvency trustees report to creditors, which claimed, Mayfair Ltd Uk, a company owned and controlled by Ashcroft, owed Gore more than 100M AUD.

=== Atkinson Gore Group ===
Gore was also the co-founder of property development company Atkinson Gore Group,. Atkinson Gore group developed predominantly residential properties on the east coast of Australia, in New South Wales, Victoria and Queensland, including the Hope Island Canal adjacent to his late father's Sanctuary Cove development. Gore was instrumental in establishing the masterplan for the Hope Island Canal development, a development that now houses more than 15000 residents. Gore also developed high rise apartment buildings on The Gold Coast, In Sydney and Melbourne CBD.

Gore also established Big State Earth Moving a company that completed the earth works to the Hope Island Canal, as well as contracting to large developers to complete civil and residential development sites. Gore planned to develop the Hope Island site into Australia first Adult Community However Gore later sold part of this site to Australand Ltd for A$90m in 2003. Gore also founded a wine exporting company called "Aussie Vineyards", which at the time was Queensland Largest exporter of wine. He was ranked sixth on the Business Review Weekly young rich list in 2006 with an estimated wealth of A$160 million. The following year he appeared 199th in the BRW Rich 200 list with an estimated wealth of A$183 million.

=== Motorsport ===
Gore has sponsored and owned V8 Supercars and IndyCar and Champ Car racing teams such as Team Australia racing. As a result, Gore played a part in the careers of two of Australia's Motorsport exports Marcos Ambrose (NASCAR) and Will Power (INDYCAR). In 2004 Gore, at the request of the Queensland Government, invested in Australian driver David Besnard, who drove in the INDY 300 classic on the Gold Coast drawing one of the biggest one day crowds to a motorsport event in Australian history. Crag Gore has business interest in Australia, the United States and Europe, mostly in the property development sector.

== Insolvency and bankruptcy ==
Gore was bankrupted in 1992 after the failure of his advertising agency and the failure of his father's business. Gore's bankruptcy was later annulled after a meeting of creditors was called by the public trustee. In 2008, Secured Capital & Finance, a firm jointly owned by Gore and John Atkinson froze redemptions to its clients. The appointed liquidator CRSWarnerKugel found that Wright Patton Shakespeare, a financial advice firm then owned by the duo, had recommended that their clients invest in SC&F. The liquidator went on to describe the arrangement to "something akin to a Ponzi scheme", something denied by Gore. The liquidators investigations suggested that between 2001 and 2004, Secured Capital & Finance used investors' money to make interest payments to other investors, forward money to other companies with the Atkinson Gore Group owned by Gore and Atkinson. None of the liquidators claims were tested in a court nor was any public examination undertaken to test the veracity of the liquidators claims.

Wright Patton Shakespeare, which had been subsequently acquired by British Author Lord Michael Ashcroft, after negotiations with Gore, to settle claims by investors, offered to pay investors 10¢ in the dollar and take over their debts, before paying out 60¢ in the dollar over four years.

Gore's creditors accepted an offer which provided for a payment of 3 million dollars, over three years, and 30% of all profits from a Gore-controlled trust on 18 November 2010. His creditors decided to terminate the PIA on 24 February 2012. after the appointment of CRS Krugel were appointed as trustee to Gore Bankruptcy, which Gore contested was a direct conflict of interest as CRSWarnerKrugel had previously made unfounded claims against Gore and business partner Atkinson. Gore declared himself bankrupt and the Public Trustee ITSA consented to on act as official trustee 18 April 2012. Creditors concerned about the contents of the official trustees' report, voted to terminate the official trustees appointment and voted in Gregory Moloney of Ferrier Hodgson on 19 September 2012. Gore was released from bankruptcy in April 2015, after concluding no evidence existed to properly extend Gore's bankruptcy. Craig Gore has been associated with a number of large scale property developments since he release. On 27 October 2020, following an earlier five-day judge-alone trial at the Brisbane District Court, Mr Craig Kirrin Gore was found guilty of six counts of fraud.
