= Katherine Legge =

British racing driver (born 1980)

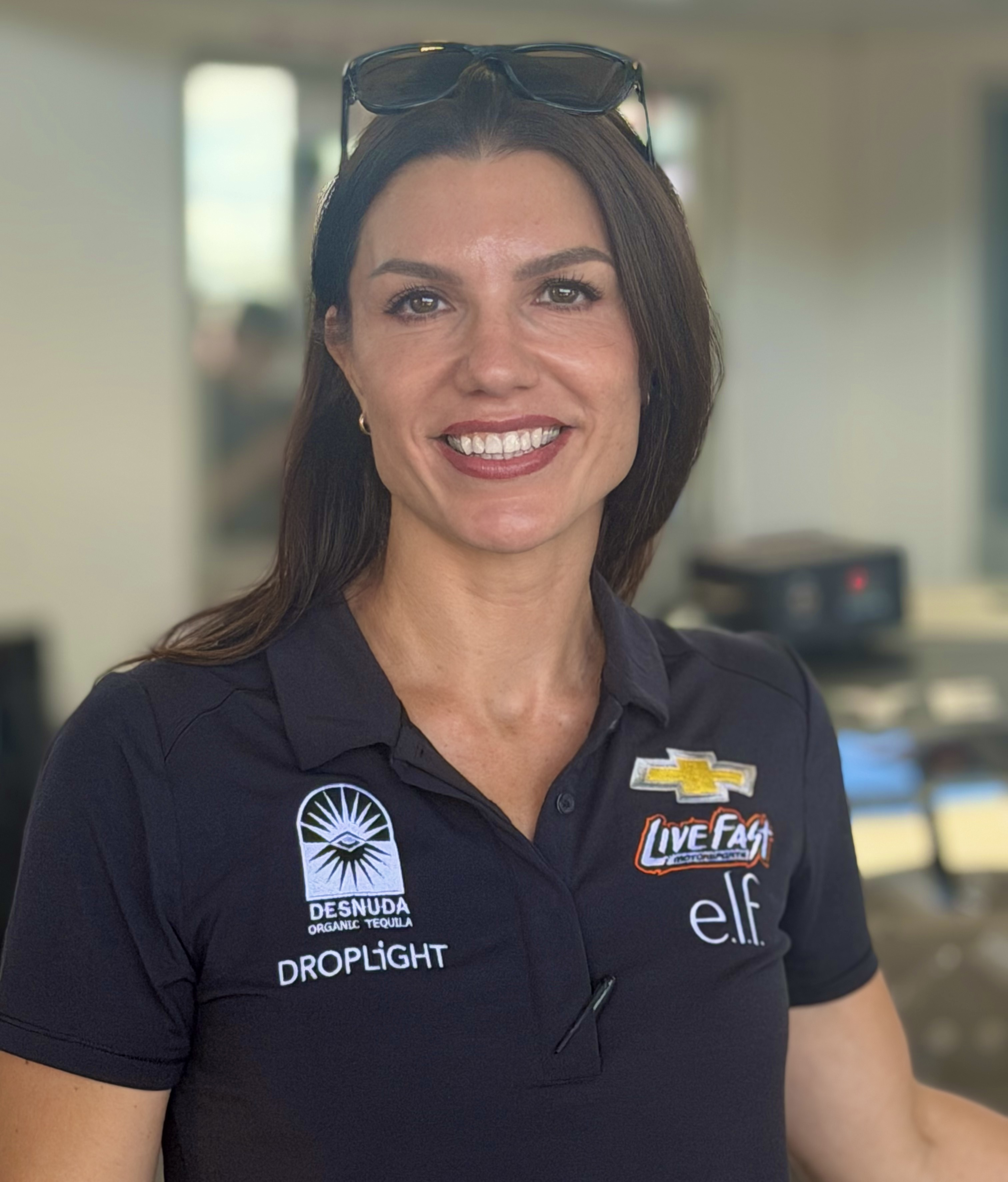
- Legge in 2025
- Nationality: (United Kingdom) British
- Born: Katherine Anne Legge; 12 July 1980 (age 46); Guildford, Surrey, England

IndyCar Series career
- 20 races run over 5 years
- Best finish: 26th (2012)
- First race: 2012 Honda Grand Prix of St. Petersburg (St. Petersburg)
- Last race: 2026 Indianapolis 500 (Indianapolis)
Wins	Podiums	Poles
0	0	0

Champ Car career
- 28 races run over 2 years
- Best finish: 15th (2007)
- First race: 2006 Toyota Grand Prix of Long Beach (Long Beach)
- Last race: 2007 Gran Premio Tecate (Mexico City)
Wins	Podiums	Poles
0	0	0

Formula E career
- Debut season: 2014–15
- Categorisation: FIA Gold (until 2015, 2019–); FIA Silver (2016–2018)
- Former teams: Amlin Aguri
- Starts: 2
- Championships: 0
- Wins: 0
- Poles: 0
- Fastest laps: 0
- Best finish: 34th in 2014–15
- Finished last season: 34th

Previous series
- 2001–2004 2003 2005 2008–2010: Formula Renault UK; British Formula Three; Atlantic Championship; Deutsche Tourenwagen Masters

NASCAR Cup Series career
- 9 races run over 2 years
- 2026 position: 40th
- Best finish: 37th (2025)
- First race: 2025 Shriners Children's 500 (Phoenix)
- Last race: 2026 Coca-Cola 600 (Charlotte)
Wins	Top tens	Poles
0	0	0

NASCAR O'Reilly Auto Parts Series career
- 11 races run over 3 years
- 2023 position: 71st
- Best finish: 51st (2018)
- First race: 2018 Rock N Roll Tequila 170 (Mid-Ohio)
- Last race: 2025 Pennzoil 250 (Indianapolis)
Wins	Top tens	Poles
0	0	0

ARCA Menards Series career
- 1 race run over 1 year
- Best finish: 143rd (2025)
- First race: 2025 Ride the 'Dente 200 (Daytona)
Wins	Top tens	Poles
0	0	0
- Statistics up to date as of 8 November 2026.

Katherine Anne Legge (/ˈlɛɡ/ LEG; born 12 July 1980) is a British racing driver. Legge has competed in the highest levels of global motorsport, including NASCAR, IndyCar, Formula E, DTM and IMSA, and tested for Minardi in Formula One. She became the first woman to win a major open-wheel race in North America in 2005, and holds the record for the fastest qualifying effort for a woman in Indianapolis 500 history, set in 2023. She is the first woman to attempt Double Duty, having competed in the 2026 Indianapolis 500 and the 2026 Coca-Cola 600 on the same day. In NASCAR, Legge is the most recent woman to start a NASCAR Cup Series race.

== Racing career ==
=== Early racing and Atlantics ===
Prior to joining the Toyota Atlantic series, Guildford-born Legge raced in several developmental open-wheel series in Britain, including Formula Three, Formula Renault and Formula Ford. In 2000, she was the first woman to achieve a pole in a Zetec race. In 2001, she beat Kimi Räikkönen's lap record and achieved a pole, and she was the first woman to receive the BRDC's "Rising Star" accolade.

Legge's move to the United States came about in 2004, when, after running out of finances to continue her racing career, she visited the UK offices of Cosworth, refusing to leave until she had met Cosworth boss Kevin Kalkhoven. Kalkhoven sent his daughter to speak to Legge to get her to leave: after a brief conversation with Legge, she instead told Kalkhoven that he should meet with her. Kalkhoven then offered her a drive in the first three rounds of the 2005 Toyota Atlantic Championship with Polestar Motor Racing: this was her first full-time drive. She won the series opener at Long Beach in her first career Atlantic start. In doing so, she became the first woman to win a developmental open-wheel race in North America. Legge went on to take her second and third wins of the season at Edmonton and San Jose. She finished the season third in the championship with three wins and five podiums. She also received the Toyota Atlantic BBS Rising Star 2005 Award.

In November 2005, Legge became the first woman to test a Formula One car since Sarah Fisher in 2002, when she tested on the second and third days (22 and 23 November) of the Minardi team's final testing session at Vallelunga. After she crashed after two laps on her first run on the track, it was decided to postpone the test until the following day, on which she completed 27 laps with a best lap time of 1:21.176. She was also the first woman to test an A1 Grand Prix car, on 9–11 December 2005 with A1 Team Great Britain.

Legge received the 2005 RACER Magazine "Most Promising Road Racer of The Year" award.

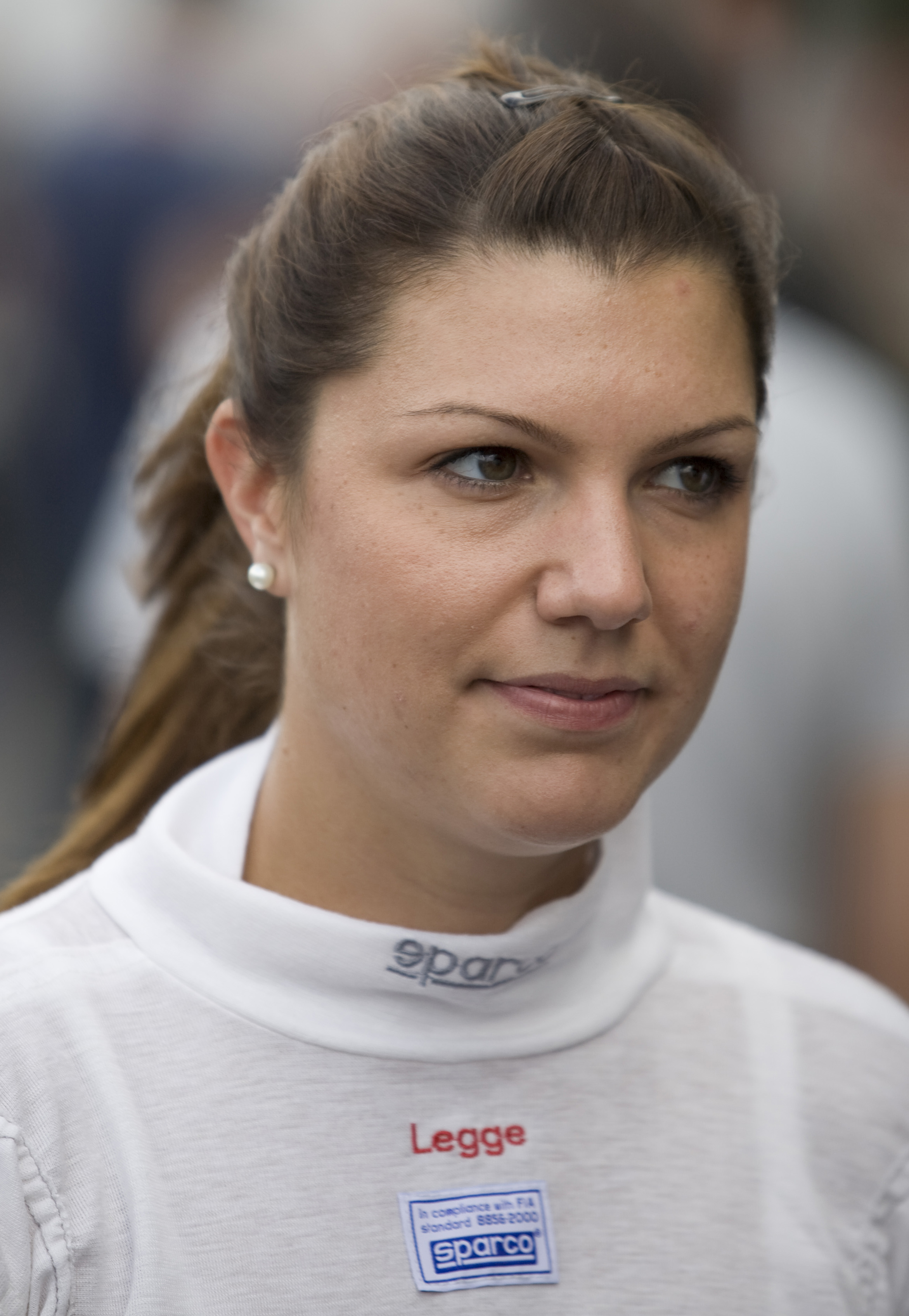
Legge in 2009

=== Champ Car ===
In the 2005–2006 off-season, Legge tested a Champ Car once for Rocketsports Racing and twice for PKV Racing. In February 2006, it was announced that she would drive for PKV Racing in the 2006 Champ Car season. In June, she became the first woman to lead a lap in series history, leading twelve laps at Milwaukee. Legge suffered a violent accident at the 2006 Grand Prix of Road America when the rear wing of her car broke; she was able to walk away from the car unharmed.

Legge drove for Dale Coyne Racing in 2007, and her best result in the series was sixth place twice.

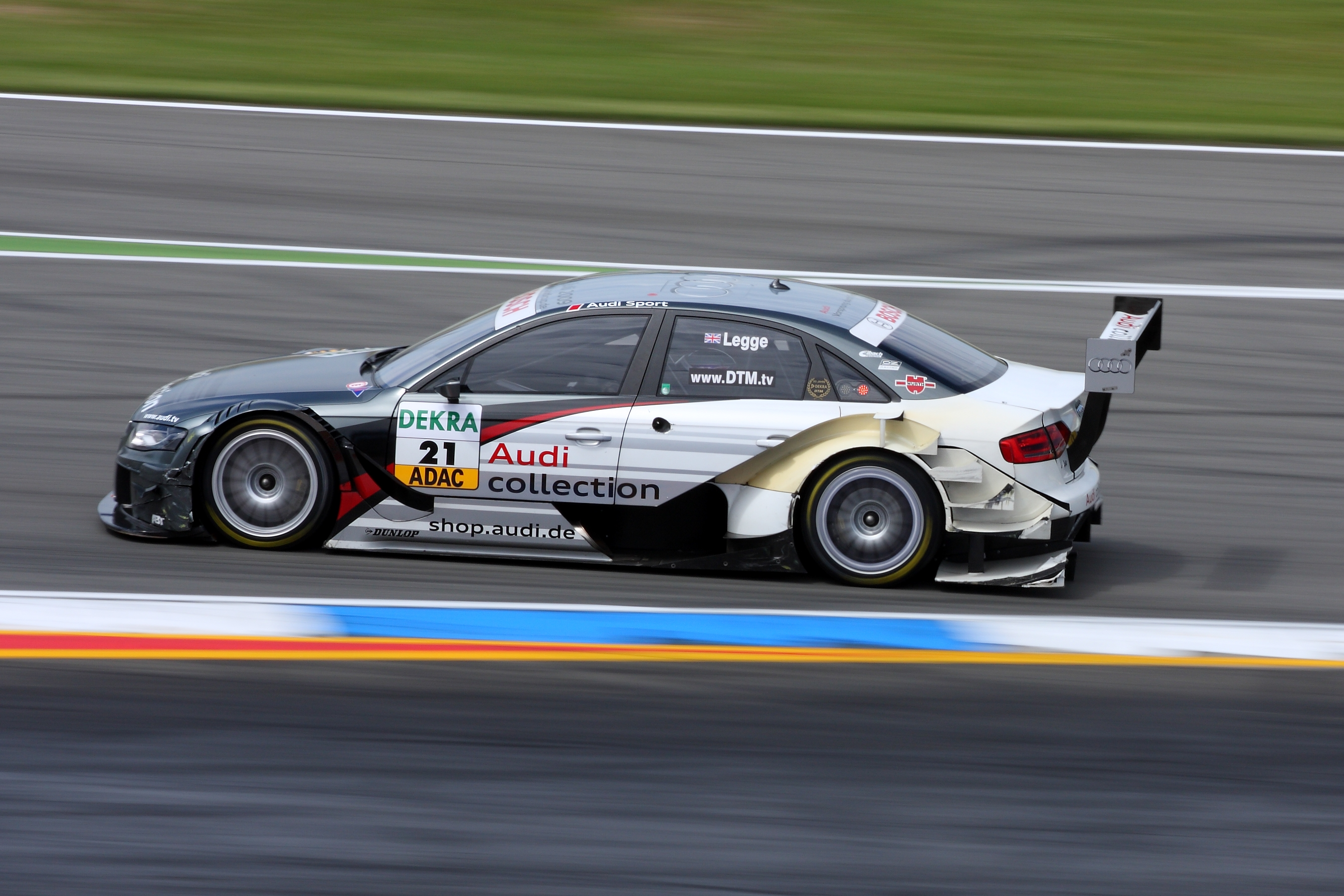
Legge competing at the Hockenheimring, during the 2009 Deutsche Tourenwagen Masters season.

=== DTM ===
In 2008, Legge moved to the Deutsche Tourenwagen Masters series, driving for Colin Kolles' Futurecom TME Audi team. For 2009 and 2010, she raced for the Abt Sportsline team, who were the 2008 champions. For 2009, she was the only one of the five drivers in the Abt Sportline team using the previous year's car.

=== IndyCar ===
In January 2012, Legge signed with Dragon Racing in the IndyCar Series, alongside Frenchman Sébastien Bourdais. However, since the Lotus engines were shown to be uncompetitive, the team made a change to Chevrolet engines. But team owner Jay Penske could only procure one Chevrolet engine lease agreement for the team, so they could only enter one car per race after Indianapolis. Therefore, for the remainder of 2012, Dragon entered Bourdais at the road and street courses, and Legge at oval tracks, except for Sonoma Raceway where both drivers were able to compete. Legge finished 26th in points, competing in ten of the fifteen races, and had a best finish of ninth in the 2012 MAVTV 500 IndyCar World Championships at Auto Club Speedway.

Legge participated in the 2013 Indianapolis 500 race as a joint venture between Schmidt Peterson Motorsports and Team Pelfrey. She took her first practice laps on bump day and qualified 33rd. She ended the race in 26th.

In May 2015, Legge announced her involvement with the Grace Autosport project to enter the 2016 Indianapolis 500 race. Working with the support of the FIA's Women in Motorsport Commission, the all-female team set out to promote technology and engineering as a career for young women. The team was unable to acquire a chassis, and subsequently did not enter the race.

Legge entered the 2023 Indianapolis 500, ten years after her previous entry. She qualified 30th, setting a new qualifying speed record for female drivers (231.070 mph/371.871 km/h). She out-qualified her three full-time Rahal Letterman Lanigan teammates, and she avoided "Last Chance Qualifying," a session where drivers compete for the final three spots in the 33-car Indy 500 starting field. Ultimately, her teammate, 16-time Indy 500 competitor Graham Rahal, was bumped from the field at the end of the session. Legge suffered multiple mechanical issues and a crash in the days leading up to the race. On lap 35, she lost control, leaving the pit lane and hitting the inside pit wall. She tried to continue the race, but was forced to retire on lap 41.

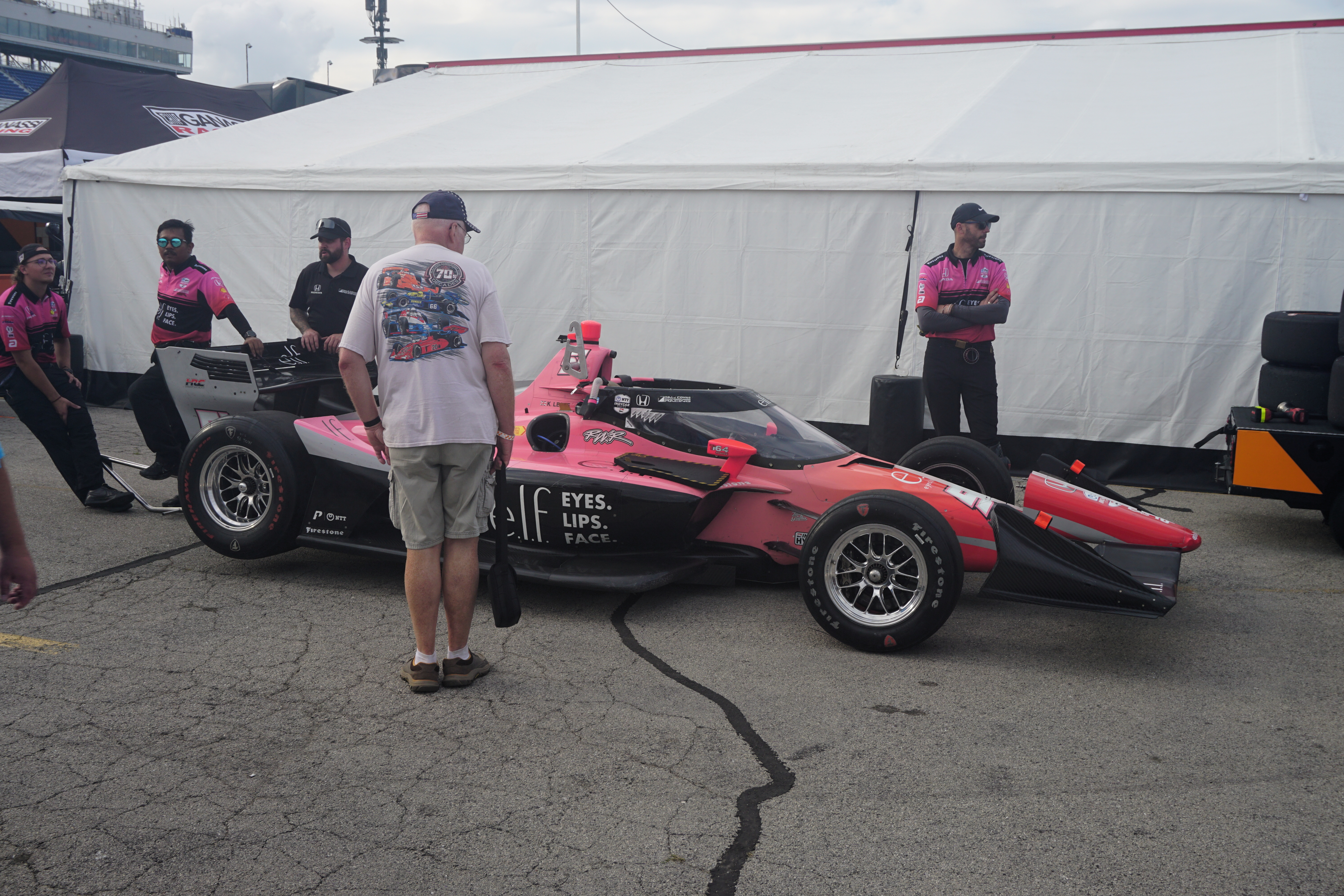
Katherine Legge's car before the 2024 Hy-Vee Milwaukee Mile 250s

For the 2024 Indianapolis 500, Legge drove for Dale Coyne Racing with Rick Ware Racing. On bump day, she brushed the wall on her last lap, but kept her foot on the gas. During "Last Chance Qualifying," she was the fastest of the four drivers fighting for the final three spots in the race. Her 19-year-old rookie teammate Nolan Siegel was ultimately bumped from the field of 33, with 2022 Indy 500 winner Marcus Ericsson and Rahal qualifying in the remaining two spots after Legge's 31st position. Her race ended when she suffered an engine failure on lap 23. Legge returned to the team for the balance of the six oval races that season.

Legge entered the 2026 Indianapolis 500, driving the No. 11 Dallara DW12 for A.J. Foyt Racing. On Lap 18, Ryan Hunter-Reay spun in front of her, and with nowhere to go, the two collided ending each driver's day, and become the first two drivers to exit the race.

=== IMSA SportsCar Championship ===
In 2013, Legge left IndyCar to join the DeltaWing program in the United SportsCar Championship. Legge competed in the 2014 and 2015 seasons for DeltaWing.

Legge joined Michael Shank Racing in 2017 to drive an Acura NSX GT3 at the IMSA SportsCar Championship.

In the 2019 24 Hours of Daytona, Legge raced as part of an all-female team alongside Simona de Silvestro, Christina Nielsen, and Ana Beatriz, having placed second in class the previous year. She was placed fifteenth in their class after Legge brushed a wall and damaged the car's suspension.

=== Formula E ===
In 2014, Legge signed for the Amlin Aguri team to compete in the inaugural season of the Formula E electric open-wheel series. She raced in the first two races before being dropped for Salvador Durán.

=== European Le Mans Series ===
In July 2020, while participating in the pre-race testing at Paul Ricard ahead of the European Le Mans Series, Legge was injured in a crash, suffering a broken wrist and leg. Legge was part of the all-female Richard Mille Racing team along with Sophia Flörsch and Tatiana Calderón.

=== NASCAR ===
==== Xfinity Series ====
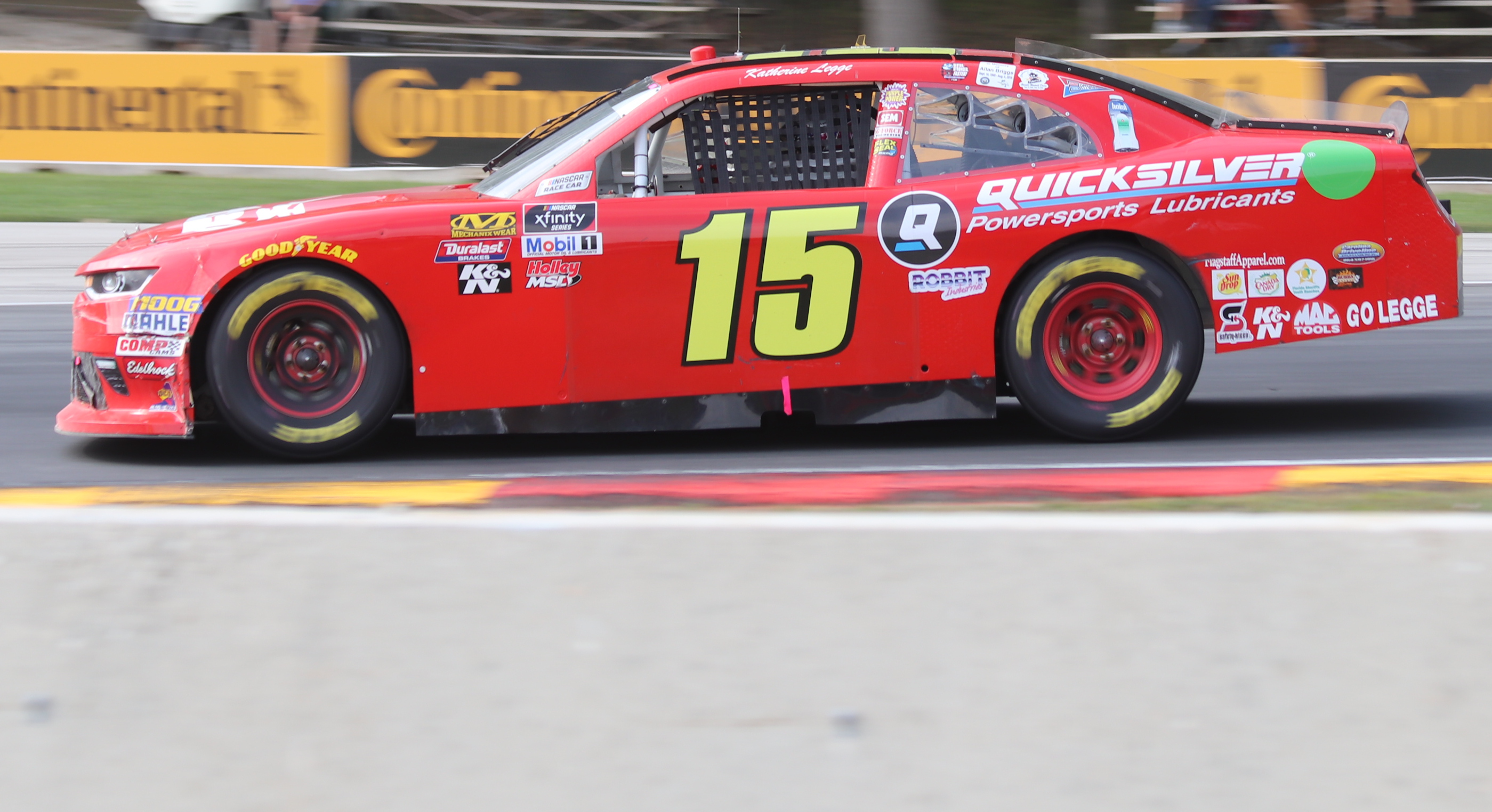
Legge's No. 15 NASCAR Xfinity car at Road America in 2018

In August 2018, Legge joined JD Motorsports for her NASCAR Xfinity Series debut at Mid-Ohio Sports Car Course, driving the No. 15 Chevrolet Camaro. As part of a two-race schedule with the team, she also competed at Road America. Legge later made her oval debut at Richmond Raceway.

On 27 July 2023, it was announced that Legge would return to NASCAR and the Xfinity Series, driving the No. 07 car for SS-Green Light Racing in the road course races at Road America, the Indianapolis road course, Watkins Glen and the Charlotte Roval. However, she only ended up running the race at Road America after her sponsor did not want to be on the car for the remaining races due to their members' connection with the writers' strike going on at the time.

On 19 April 2025, Legge put up a qualifying lap of 23.397 in her No. 32 Chevy, beating five other cars qualifying times, but due to a lack of car owner points (NASCAR's Owner Points Provisional Rule) she was one of two cars bumped out by teams with guaranteed starting spots based on points for the North Carolina Education Lottery 250 at Rockingham Speedway. Then it was announced that she would race the No. 53 car for Joey Gase Motorsports, in place of J. J. Yeley, who had already qualified the day prior, secured a 31st-place start. Legge finished 36th after William Sawalich got into the back of her car, which sent her spinning, and Kasey Kahne had nowhere to go on lap 52.

In her second straight Xfinity effort following a week that saw her receive death threats and throngs of inappropriate sexual comments, she qualified for the 2025 Ag-Pro 300 at Talladega Superspeedway on 25 April by clocking in a faster time than 14 cars, including two of her teammates to secure her 27th place in the field. Before the race, NASCAR Commissioner Steve Phelps spoke to CNN about Legge and the abuse she had suffered, condemning fans' behavior towards her while defending her against critics who thinks she is somehow undeserving of her place in NASCAR. During the race, she became the fourth woman in history to lead an Xfinity Series race — and the second at Talladega, taking the lead on Lap 75, equaling Danica Patrick’s one-lap out front at Talladega in 2012. While running fifteenth on lap 100, she was collected in an accident triggered by Aric Almirola, who later apologized, saying miscommunication with his spotter led to the high-speed miscue. She finished 34th.

==== Cup Series ====
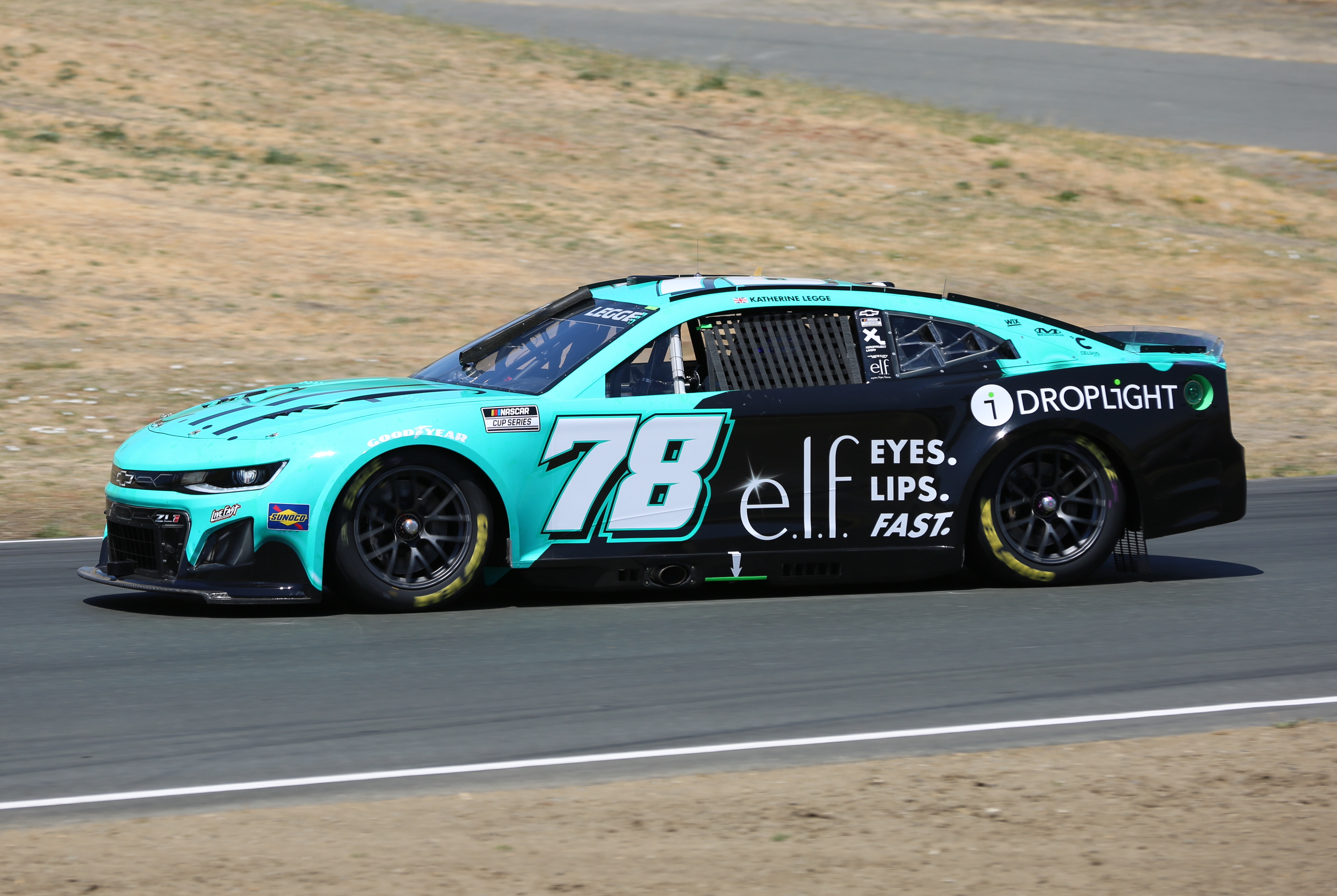
Legge's No. 78 car at Sonoma Raceway in 2025

On 3 March 2025, it was announced that Legge would make her NASCAR Cup Series debut at Phoenix Raceway, driving the No. 78 Chevrolet for Live Fast Motorsports, where she crashed during lap 210. This made her the first woman to compete in the Cup Series since Danica Patrick in the 2018 Daytona 500. It was also the first time that the oldest driver in the field was a female in series history. On 6 July 2025, she scored a top-20 finish on the Chicago Street Course, the best result for a woman in Cup since Patrick eight years prior — crossing the line in 19th for her best-ever result in the series.

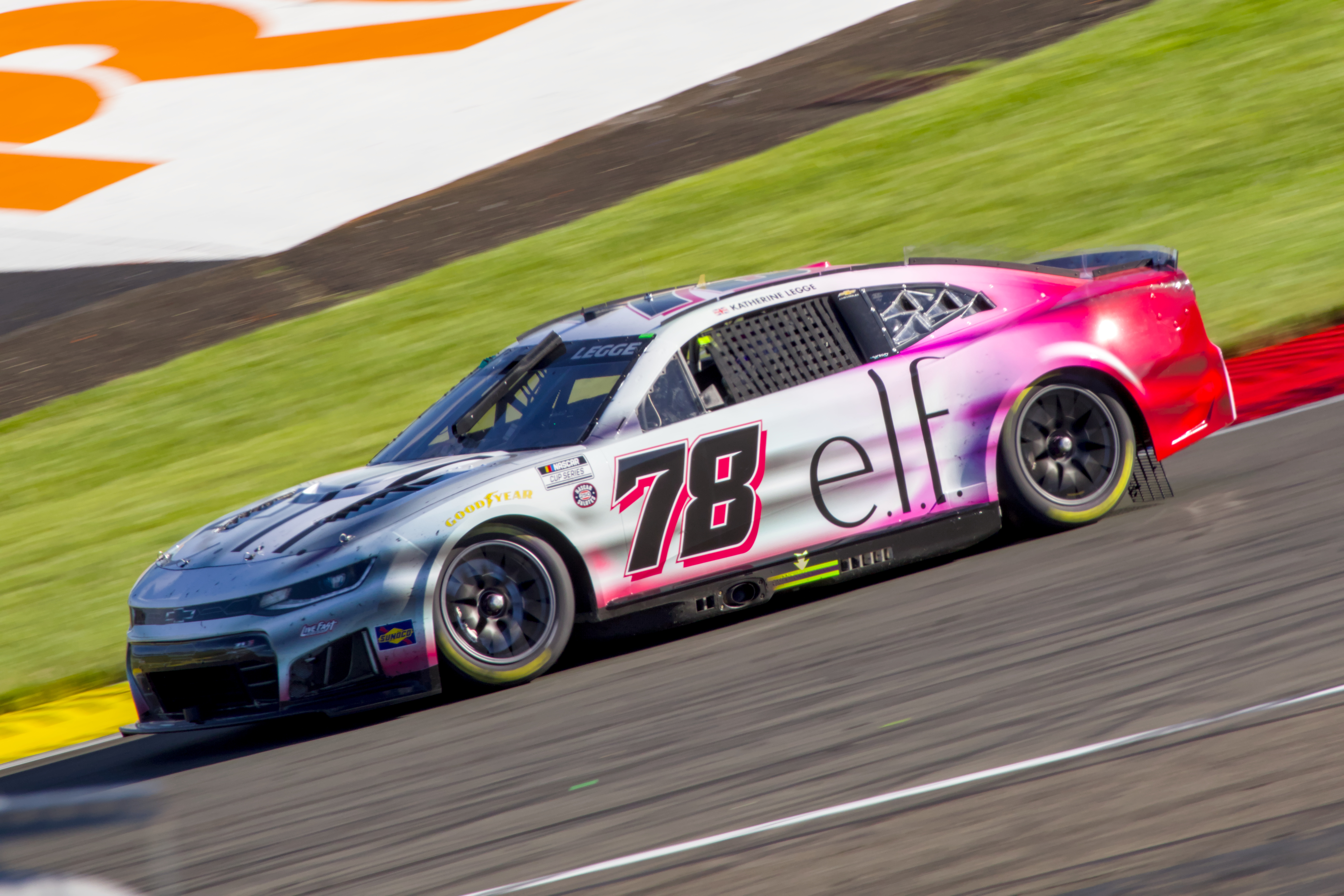
Legge's No. 78 car at Watkins Glen International in 2026

During the 2026 season, Legge drove the Live Fast Motorsports No. 78 car at the 2026 Coca-Cola 600 after the Indy 500. This made her the first woman to attempt "The Double"; and at age 45, the oldest driver to do so as well. Legge finished the race after she lost a tire during the race causing her to be penalized, sending her many laps down to finish 31st.

==== ARCA ====
On 7 January 2025, it was announced that Legge would make her ARCA debut in the 2025 season-opener at Daytona in the No. 23 car for Sigma Performance Services. She finished 39th after being involved in an early wreck.

=== Pikes Peak International Hill Climb ===
Legge took part in the 2024 Pikes Peak International Hill Climb, driving an Acura Integra Type S DE5 in the Time Attack 1 category. She placed 27th overall, and fifth of eleven in her division.

== Personal life ==
Legge is a member of the Women in Motorsport Commission of the FIA (Federation Internationale de l'Automobile).

Legge was briefly engaged to German racing driver Peter Terting.

On 18 April 2024, Legge was inducted into the Long Beach Motorsports Walk of Fame, the first woman to earn the honor.

== Motorsports career results ==
=== Racing career summary ===
Season	Series	Team	Races	Wins	Poles	F/Laps	Podiums	Points	Position
2000	British Formula Ford Championship	?	1	0	0	0	0	0	?
2000	Avon Junior Zetec Challenge	?	?	?	?	?	?	?	?
2000	Formula Ford Zetec – Kent County	?	?	?	?	?	?	?	?
2001	Formula Renault 2.0 UK	Falcon Motorsport	1	0	0	0	0	3	39th
2001	Formula Renault Winter Championship	Falcon Motorsport	4	0	0	0	0	0	0
2002	Formula Renault 2.0 UK	Fortec Motorsport	4	0	1	0	0	5	37th
2002	BWRDC Monoposto Trophy	?	3	?	?	?	?	18	**3rd**
2002	BWRDC Goodwin Trophy	?	3	?	?	?	?	18	12th
2003	British Formula 3 Championship	Team SYR	4	0	0	0	0	0	32nd
2004	Formula Renault 2.0 UK	Motaworld Racing	4	0	0	0	0	9	36th
2004	North American Formula Renault 2000	?	?	0	0	?	0	54	10th
2005	Atlantic Championship	Polestar Racing Group	12	3	0	0	5	267	**3rd**
2005	Formula One	Minardi Cosworth	Test driver						
2006	Champ Car World Series	PKV Racing	14	0	0	0	0	133	16th
2007	Champ Car World Series	Dale Coyne Racing	14	0	0	0	0	108	15th
2007	Rolex Sports Car Series – DP	Robinson Racing	1	0	0	0	0	16	70th
2008	Deutsche Tourenwagen Masters	Futurecom TME	11	0	0	0	0	0	19th
2009	Deutsche Tourenwagen Masters	Abt Sportsline	10	0	0	1	0	0	18th
2010	Deutsche Tourenwagen Masters	Team Rosberg	10	0	0	0	0	0	18th
2012	IndyCar Series	Lotus-Dragon Racing	4	0	0	0	0	137	26th
2012	IndyCar Series	Dragon Racing	6	0	0	0	0	137	26th
2013	American Le Mans Series – LMP1	DeltaWing Racing Cars	7	0	0	0	2	26	7th
2013	Rolex Sports Car Series – DP	Starworks Motorsport	1	0	0	0	0	0	NC
2013	IndyCar Series	Schmidt Peterson Motorsports	1	0	0	0	0	8	37th
2014	United SportsCar Championship – Prototype	DeltaWing Racing Cars	6	0	0	0	0	131	19th
2014	Continental Tire Sports Car Challenge – ST	Compass360 Racing	1	0	0	0	0	22	64th
2014–15	Formula E	Amlin Aguri	2	0	0	0	0	0	34th
2015	United SportsCar Championship – Prototype	DeltaWing Racing Cars w/ Claro/TracFone	9	0	0	0	0	207	8th
2016	IMSA SportsCar Championship – Prototype	Panoz DeltaWing Racing	9	0	0	0	0	247	10th
2016	IMSA SportsCar Championship – Prototype	Michael Shank Racing w/ Curb Agajanian	1	0	0	0	0	247	10th
2017	IMSA SportsCar Championship – GTD	Michael Shank Racing w/ Curb Agajanian	12	2	0	0	4	286	6th
2017	Lamborghini Super Trofeo North America – Pro	Prestige Performance	2	0	0	0	0	0	NC
2017	Lamborghini Super Trofeo World Final – Pro	Wayne Taylor Racing	2	0	0	0	0	N/A	NC
2018	IMSA SportsCar Championship – GTD	Michael Shank Racing w/ Curb Agajanian	11	2	1	0	7	329	**2nd**
2018	NASCAR Xfinity Series	JD Motorsports	4	0	0	N/A	N/A	46	51st
2018–19	Jaguar I-Pace eTrophy – Pro	Rahal Letterman Lanigan Racing	10	1	1	1	3	86	5th
2018–19	Asian Le Mans Series – LMP3	R24	1	0	0	0	0	4	13th
2019	IMSA SportsCar Championship – GTD	Heinricher Racing w/ Meyer Shank Racing	11	0	0	0	0	221	9th
2020	IMSA SportsCar Championship – GTD	GEAR Racing powered by GRT Grasser	1	0	0	0	0	15	59th
2021	IMSA SportsCar Championship – GTD	Team Hardpoint EBM	12	0	0	0	0	2400	9th
2021	FIA World Endurance Championship – LMGTE Am	Iron Lynx	3	0	0	0	0	14	19th
2021	GT World Challenge Europe Endurance Cup	Iron Lynx	1	0	0	0	0	0	NC
2021	GT World Challenge Europe Endurance Cup – Pro-Am	Iron Lynx	1	0	0	0	0	9	28th
2022	IMSA SportsCar Championship – GTD	Team Hardpoint	0	0	0	0	1292	16th	
2023	IMSA SportsCar Championship – GTD	Gradient Racing	11	0	0	1	0	2552	11th
2023	IndyCar Series	Rahal Letterman Lanigan Racing	1	0	0	0	0	5	37th
2023	NASCAR Xfinity Series	SS-Green Light Racing	1	0	0	N/A	N/A	1	71st
2024	IMSA SportsCar Championship – GTD	Gradient Racing	2	0	0	0	0	309	51st
2024	IndyCar Series	Dale Coyne Racing with Rick Ware Racing	7	0	0	0	0	61	29th
2025	NASCAR Cup Series	Live Fast Motorsports	7	0	0	0	N/A	56	37th
2025	NASCAR Xfinity Series	Joey Gase Motorsports with Scott Osteen	1	0	0	0	N/A	0	NC
2025	NASCAR Xfinity Series	Jordan Anderson Racing	5	0	0	0	N/A	0	NC
2025	ARCA Menards Series	Sigma Performance Services	1	0	0	N/A	N/A	5	143rd
2026	IndyCar Series	HMD Motorsports with A. J. Foyt Racing	1	0	0	0	0	5	33rd
2026	NASCAR Cup Series	Live Fast Motorsports	2	0	0	0	N/A	8	40th

^{*} Season still in progress

=== Complete American open-wheel racing results ===
(key)

==== Atlantic Championship ====
Year	Team	1	2	3	4	5	6	7	8	9	10	11	12	Rank	Points
2005	Polestar Racing Group	LBH; 1	MTY; 5	POR1; 9	POR2; 3	CLE1; 16	CLE2; 5	TOR; 6	EDM; 1	SJO; 1	DEN; 17	ROA; 2	MTL; 4	**3rd**	**267**

Years	Teams	Races	Poles	Wins	Podiums (Non-win)**	Top 10s (Non-podium)***	Championships
1	1	12	0	3	2	5	0

** Podium (Non-win) indicates 2nd or 3rd place finishes.
*** Top 10s (Non-podium) indicates 4th through 10th place finishes.

==== Champ Car ====
Year	Team	No.	Chassis	Engine	1	2	3	4	5	6	7	8	9	10	11	12	13	14	Rank	Points	Ref
2006	PKV Racing	21	Lola B02/00	Ford XFE	LBH; 8	HOU; 14	MTY; 14	MIL; 6	POR; 13	CLE; 8	TOR; 14	EDM; 13	SJO; 12	DEN; 9	MTL; 13	ROA; 16	SRF; 15	MXC; 16	**16th**	**133**	
2007	Dale Coyne Racing	11	Panoz DP01	Cosworth XFE	LVG; 6	LBH; 10	HOU; 16	POR; 17	CLE; 15	MTT; 11	TOR; 16	EDM; 16	SJO; 16	ROA; 15	ZOL; 11	ASN; 12	SRF; 15	MXC; 15	**15th**	**108**	

Years	Teams	Races	Poles	Wins	Podiums (Non-win)**	Top 10s (Non-podium)***	Championships
2	2	28	0	0	0	6	0

** Podium (Non-win) indicates 2nd or 3rd place finishes.
*** Top 10s (Non-podium) indicates 4th through 10th place finishes.

==== IndyCar Series ====
Year	Team	No.	Chassis	Engine	1	2	3	4	5	6	7	8	9	10	11	12	13	14	15	16	17	18	19	Rank	Points	Ref
2012	Lotus-Dragon Racing	6	Dallara DW12	Lotus	STP; 23	ALA; 23	LBH; 19	SAO; 26																26th	137	
2012	Dragon Racing	6	Dallara DW12	Chevrolet					INDY; 22	DET	TXS; 15	MIL; 18	IOW; 15	TOR	EDM	MOH	SNM; 24	BAL	FON; 9					26th	137	
2013	Schmidt Peterson Hamilton HP Motorsports	81	Dallara DW12	Honda	STP	ALA	LBH	SAO	INDY; 26	DET	DET	TXS	MIL	IOW	POC	TOR	TOR	MOH	SNM	BAL	HOU	HOU	FON	37th	8	
2023	Rahal Letterman Lanigan Racing	44	Dallara DW12	Honda	STP	TXS	LBH	ALA	IMS	INDY; 33	DET	ROA	MOH	TOR	IOW	IOW	NSH	IMS	GTW	POR	LAG			37th	5	
2024	Dale Coyne Racing	51	Dallara DW12	Honda	STP	THE	LBH	ALA	IMS	INDY; 29	DET	ROA	LAG	MOH	IOW; 17	IOW; 24	TOR	GTW; 27	POR	MIL; 19	MIL; 15	NSH; 26		29th	61	
2026	HMD Motorsports w/ A. J. Foyt Racing	11	Dallara DW12	Chevrolet	STP	PHX	ARL	ALA	LBH	IMS	INDY; 33	DET	GTW	ROA	MOH	NSH	POR	MRK	WSH	MIL	MIL	LAG		33rd	5	

Years	Teams	Races	Poles	Wins	Podiums (Non-win)**	Top 10s (Non-podium)***	Championships
5	5	20	0	0	0	1	0

** Podium (Non-win) indicates 2nd or 3rd place finishes.
*** Top 10s (Non-podium) indicates 4th through 10th place finishes.

==== Indianapolis 500 ====
Year	Chassis	Engine	Start	Finish	Team
2012	Dallara	Chevrolet	30	22	Dragon Racing
2013	Dallara	Honda	33	26	Schmidt Peterson Motorsports
2023	Dallara	Honda	29	33	Rahal Letterman Lanigan Racing
2024	Dallara	Honda	31	29	Dale Coyne Racing
2026	Dallara	Chevrolet	26	33	HMD Motorsports w/ A. J. Foyt Racing

=== Complete A1 Grand Prix results ===
(key)

Year	Entrant	1	2	3	4	5	6	7	8	9	10	11	12	13	14	15	16	17	18	19	20	21	22	DC	Points
2005–06	Great Britain	GBR; SPR	GBR; FEA	GER; SPR	GER; FEA	POR; SPR	POR; FEA	AUS; SPR	AUS; FEA	MYS; SPR	MYS; FEA	UAE; SPR; PO	UAE; FEA; PO	RSA; SPR	RSA; FEA	IDN; SPR	IDN; FEA	MEX; SPR	MEX; FEA	USA; SPR	USA; FEA	CHN; SPR	CHN; FEA	**3rd**	**97**

=== Complete Deutsche Tourenwagen Masters results ===
(key) (Races in italics indicate fastest lap)

Year	Team	Car	1	2	3	4	5	6	7	8	9	10	11	Rank	Points
2008	Futurecom TME	Audi A4 DTM 2006	HOC; 18	OSC; 17	MUG; 18	LAU; 15	NOR; 15	ZAN; 16†	NÜR; Ret	BRH; 19	CAT; Ret	LMS; 16	HOC; NC	19th	0
2009	Abt Sportsline	Audi A4 DTM 2008	HOC; 12	LAU; Ret	NOR; 12	ZAN; Ret	OSC; 17†	NÜR; Ret	BRH; 15	CAT; Ret	DIJ; 16	HOC; 17†		18th	0
2010	Team Rosberg	Audi A4 DTM 2008	HOC; 14	VAL; DNS	LAU; 14	NOR; 16	NÜR; 15	ZAN; 14	BRH; 14	OSC; Ret	HOC; Ret	ADR; 15	SHA; 14	18th	0

- † — Retired, but was classified as she completed 90% of the winner's race distance.

=== Complete Formula E results ===
(key) (Races in bold indicate pole position; races in italics indicate fastest lap)

Year	Team	Chassis	Powertrain	1	2	3	4	5	6	7	8	9	10	11	Pos	Points
2014–15	Amlin Aguri	Spark SRT01-e	SRT01-e	BEI; 15	PUT; 15	PDE	BUE	MIA	LBH	MCO	BER	MSC	LDN	LDN	34th	0

=== Complete IMSA SportsCar Championship results ===
(key) (Races in bold indicate pole position) (Races in italics indicate fastest lap)

Year	Entrant	Class	Make	Engine	1	2	3	4	5	6	7	8	9	10	11	12	Rank	Points
2014	DeltaWing Racing Cars	P	DeltaWing DWC13	Élan (Mazda) 1.9 L I4 Turbo	DAY; 16	SEB; 15	LBH	LGA; 9	DET	WGL; 12	MOS; DNS	IMS	ELK; 6	COA	PET; 4		19th	131
2015	DeltaWing Racing Cars with Claro/TracFone	P	DeltaWing DWC13	Élan (Mazda) 1.9 L I4 Turbo	DAY; 15	SEB; 12	LBH; 9	LGA; 8	DET	WGL; 8	MOS; 8	ELK; 6	COA; 7	PET; 8			8th	207
2016	Panoz DeltaWing Racing	P	DeltaWing DWC13	Élan (Mazda) 1.9 L I4 Turbo	DAY; 12	SEB; 9	LBH; 8	LGA; 5		WGL; 7	MOS; 7	ELK; 7	COA; 5	PET; 8			10th	247
2016	Michael Shank Racing with Curb Agajanian	P	Ligier JS P2	Honda HR28TT 2.8 L V6 Turbo					DET; 5								10th	247
2017	Michael Shank Racing	GTD	Acura NSX GT3	Acura 3.5 L Turbo V6	DAY; 11	SEB; 14	LBH; 7	COA; 15	DET; 1	WGL; 1	MOS; 2	LIM; 5	ELK; 15	VIR; 15	LGA; 2	PET; 14	6th	286
2018	Michael Shank Racing with Curb-Agajanian	GTD	Acura NSX GT3	Acura 3.5 L Turbo V6	DAY; 2	SEB; 8	MOH; 2	DET; 1	WGL; 2	MOS; 5	LIM; 4	ELK; 7	VIR; 3	**LGA**; 1	PET; 2		2nd	329
2019	Heinricher Racing with Meyer Shank Racing	GTD	Acura NSX GT3	Acura 3.5 L Turbo V6	DAY; 12	SEB; 8	MOH; 10	DET; 9†	WGL; 4	MOS; 6	LIM; 12	ELK; 13	VIR; 12	LGA; 6	PET; 7		9th	221
2020	GEAR Racing powered by GRT Grasser	GTD	Lamborghini Huracán GT3 Evo	Lamborghini 5.2 L V10	DAY; 16	DAY	SEB	ELK	VIR	ATL	MOH	CLT	PET	LGA	SEB		57th	15
2021	Team Hardpoint EBM	GTD	Porsche 911 GT3 R	Porsche 4.0 L Flat-6	DAY; 10	SEB; 5	MOH; 11	DET; 11†	WGL; 10	WGL; 8†	LIM; 12	ELK; 8	LGA; 8	LBH; 9	VIR; 10	PET; 8	9th	2400
2022	Team Hardpoint	GTD	Porsche 911 GT3 R	Porsche MA1.76/MDG.G 4.0 L Flat-6	DAY; 10	SEB; 8	LBH; 7†	LGA; 10	MOH	DET	WGL; 14	MOS	LIM	ELK	VIR; 10	PET; 12	16th	1292
2023	Gradient Racing	GTD	Acura NSX GT3 Evo22	Acura 3.5 L Turbo V6	DAY; 4	SEB; 12	LBH; 9	LGA; 13	WGL; 5	MOS; 11	LIM; 6	ELK; 10	VIR; 10	IMS; 13	PET; 15		11th	2552
2024	Gradient Racing	GTD	Acura NSX GT3 Evo22	Acura 3.5 L Turbo V6	DAY; 19	SEB; 17	LBH	LGA	WGL	MOS	ELK	VIR	IMS	PET			51st	309

^{†} Points only counted towards the WeatherTech Sprint Cup and not the overall GTD Championship.

==== 24 Hours of Daytona results ====
Year	Class	No	Team	Car	Co-drivers	Laps	Position	Class Pos.
2007	DP	84	(United States) Robinson Racing	Riley Mk XI	(United States) George Robinson (United States) Wally Dallenbach Jr. (United States) Paul Dallenbach	596	25	15
2014	P	0	(United States) DeltaWing Racing Cars	DeltaWing DWC13	(Colombia) Gabby Chaves (United States) Alexander Rossi (United Kingdom) Andy Meyrick	288	61 ^{DNF}	17 ^{DNF}
2015	P	0	(United States) Claro/TracFone DeltaWing Racing	DeltaWing DWC13	(Colombia) Gabby Chaves (Mexico) Memo Rojas (United Kingdom) Andy Meyrick	42	53 ^{DNF}	16 ^{DNF}
2016	P	0	(United States) Panoz DeltaWing Racing	DeltaWing DWC13	(United States) Sean Rayhall (United Kingdom) Andy Meyrick (Germany) Andreas Wirth	119	53 ^{DNF}	12 ^{DNF}
2017	GTD	93	(United States) Michael Shank Racing with Curb-Agajanian	Acura NSX GT3	(United States) Andy Lally (United States) Graham Rahal (Canada) Mark Wilkins	617	29	11
2018	GTD	86	(United States) Michael Shank Racing with Curb-Agajanian	Acura NSX GT3	(United States) A. J. Allmendinger (United States) Trent Hindman (Portugal) Álvaro Parente	751	22	2
2019	GTD	57	(United States) Heinricher Racing with Meyer Shank Racing	Acura NSX GT3	(Switzerland) Simona de Silvestro (Denmark) Christina Nielsen (Brazil) Bia Figueiredo	550	32	12
2020	GTD	19	(United States) GEAR Racing powered by GRT Grasser	Lamborghini Huracán GT3	(Denmark) Christina Nielsen (Colombia) Tatiana Calderón (Switzerland) Rahel Frey	471	35 ^{DNF}	16 ^{DNF}
2021	GTD	88	(United States) Team Hardpoint EBM	Porsche 911 GT3	(New Zealand) Earl Bamber (United States) Rob Ferriol (Denmark) Christina Nielsen	737	32	10
2022	GTD	99	(United States) Team Hardpoint	Porsche 911 GT3	(United States) Nick Boulle (United States) Rob Ferriol (United Kingdom) Stefan Wilson	672	37	10
2023	GTD	66	(United States) Gradient Racing	Acura NSX GT3 Evo22	(Germany) Mario Farnbacher (United States) Marc Miller (United States) Sheena Monk	729	22	4
2024	GTD	66	(United States) Gradient Racing	Acura NSX GT3 Evo22	(Colombia) Tatiana Calderón (United Kingdom) Stevan McAleer (United States) Sheena Monk	368	49 ^{DNF}	19 ^{DNF}

=== Complete FIA World Endurance Championship results ===
(key) (Races in bold indicate pole position) (Races in italics indicate fastest lap)

Year	Entrant	Class	Car	Engine	1	2	3	4	5	6	Rank	Points
2021	Iron Lynx	LMGTE Am	Ferrari 488 GTE Evo	Ferrari F154CB 3.9 L Turbo V8	SPA; 8	ALG	MNZ	LMS	BHR; 8	BHR; 8	19th	14

=== NASCAR ===
(key) (Bold – Pole position awarded by qualifying time. Italics – Pole position earned by points standings or practice time. * – Most laps led.)

==== Cup Series ====
NASCAR Cup Series results
Year	Team	No.	Make	1	2	3	4	5	6	7	8	9	10	11	12	13	14	15	16	17	18	19	20	21	22	23	24	25	26	27	28	29	30	31	32	33	34	35	36	NCSC	Pts	Ref
2025	Live Fast Motorsports	78	Chevy	DAY	ATL	COA	PHO; 30	LVS	HOM	MAR	DAR	BRI	TAL	TEX	KAN	CLT	NSH	MCH	MXC; 32	POC	ATL	CSC; 19	SON; 31	DOV	IND; 17	IOW	GLN; 36	RCH	DAY	DAR	GTW	BRI	NHA	KAN	ROV	LVS; 31	TAL	MAR	PHO	37th	63	
2026	Live Fast Motorsports	78	Chevy	DAY	ATL	COA	PHO	LVS	DAR	MAR	BRI	KAN	TAL	TEX	GLN; 35	CLT; 31	NSH	MCH	POC	COR	SON	CHI	ATL	NWS	IND	IOW	RCH	NHA	DAY	DAR	GTW	BRI	KAN	LVS	CLT	PHO	TAL	MAR	HOM	40th	8	

==== Xfinity Series ====
NASCAR Xfinity Series results
Year	Team	No.	Make	1	2	3	4	5	6	7	8	9	10	11	12	13	14	15	16	17	18	19	20	21	22	23	24	25	26	27	28	29	30	31	32	33	NXSC	Pts	Ref
2018	JD Motorsports	15	Chevy	DAY	ATL	LVS	PHO	CAL	TEX	BRI	RCH	TAL	DOV	CLT	POC	MCH	IOW	CHI	DAY	KEN	NHA	IOW	GLN	MOH; 30	BRI	ROA; 14	DAR	IND	LVS	RCH; 28	ROV; 33	DOV	KAN	TEX	PHO	HOM	51st	46	
2023	SS-Green Light Racing	07	Chevy	DAY	CAL	LVS	PHO	ATL	COA	RCH	MAR	TAL	DOV	DAR	CLT	PIR	SON	NSH	CSC	ATL	NHA	POC	ROA; 38	MCH	IRC	GLN	DAY	DAR	KAN	BRI	TEX	ROV	LVS	HOM	MAR	PHO	71st	1	
2025	Jordan Anderson Racing	32	Chevy	DAY	ATL	COA	PHO	LVS	HOM	MAR	DAR	BRI	CAR; DNQ	TAL; 34	TEX; 32	CLT; 34	NSH; DNQ	MXC	POC	ATL; 34	CSC	SON	DOV	IND; 37	IOW	GLN	DAY	PIR	GTW	BRI	KAN	ROV	LVS	TAL	MAR	PHO	102nd	0^{1}	
2025	Joey Gase Motorsports with Scott Osteen	53	Chevy										CAR; 36																								102nd	0^{1}	

^{*} Season still in progress
^{1} Ineligible for series points

=== ARCA Menards Series ===
(key) (Bold – Pole position awarded by qualifying time. Italics – Pole position earned by points standings or practice time. * – Most laps led.)

ARCA Menards Series results
Year	Team	No.	Make	1	2	3	4	5	6	7	8	9	10	11	12	13	14	15	16	17	18	19	20	AMSC	Pts	Ref
2025	Sigma Performance Services	23	Chevy	DAY; 39	PHO	TAL	KAN	CLT	MCH	BLN	ELK	LRP	DOV	IRP	IOW	GLN	ISF	MAD	DSF	BRI	SLM	KAN	TOL	143rd	5	

== See also ==
- List of female Indianapolis 500 drivers
- List of female NASCAR drivers
