= Falcon F7 =

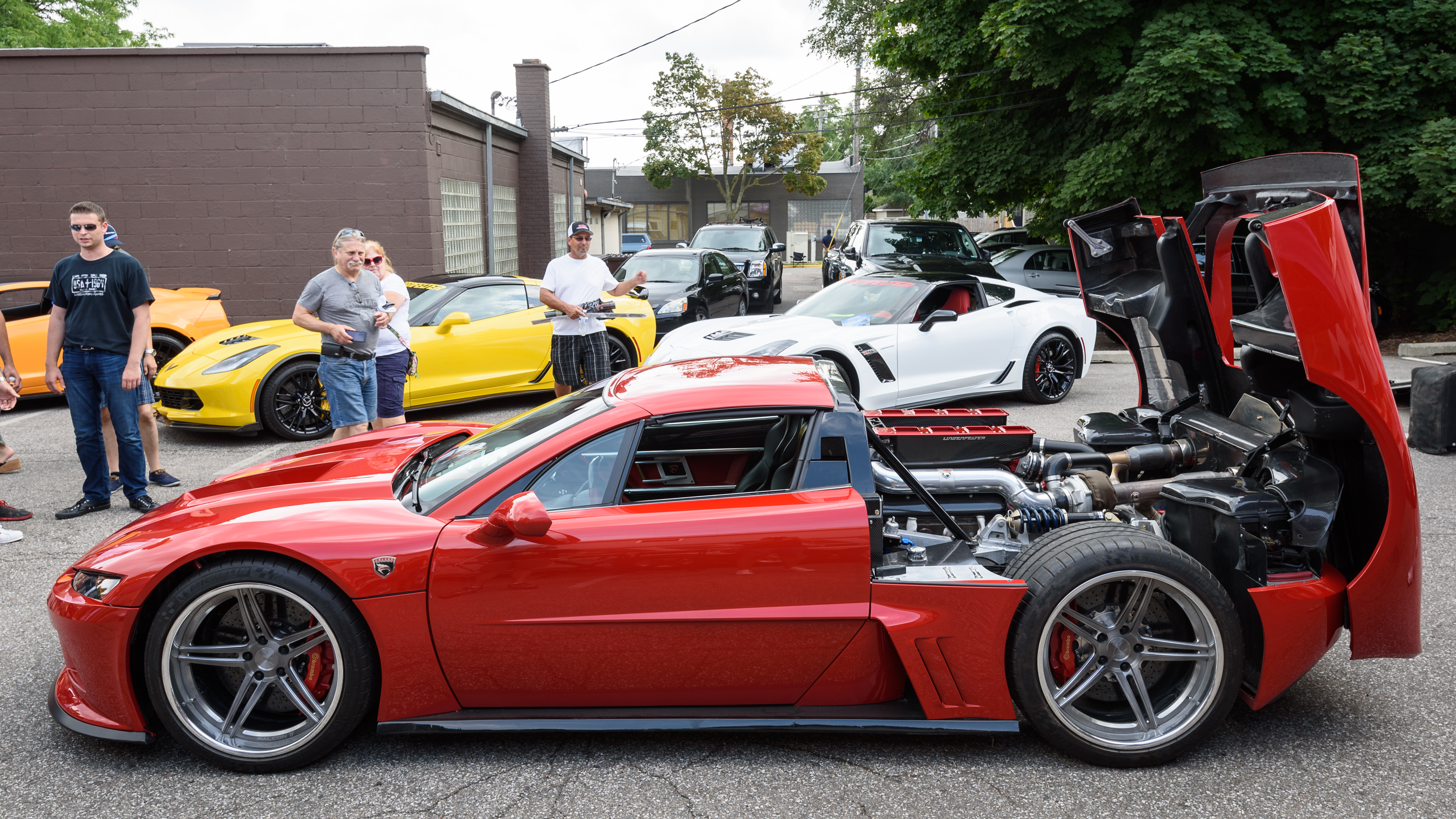

Overview
- Manufacturer: Falcon Motorsports
- Production: 2012–2017 (7 produced)
- Assembly: Holly, Michigan, USA
- Designer: Jeff Lemke

Body and chassis
- Class: Sports car (S)
- Body style: 2-door coupe
- Layout: Rear mid-engine, rear-wheel drive

Powertrain
- Engine: 7.0 L LS7 V8
- Power output: 629 hp (469 kW)
- Transmission: 6-speed manual transmission

Dimensions
- Wheelbase: 2,670 mm (105.1 in)
- Length: 4,420 mm (174.0 in)
- Width: 1,980 mm (78.0 in)
- Height: 1,120 mm (44.1 in)
- Kerb weight: 1,263 kg (2,784 lb)

The Falcon F7 is a sports car manufactured by Falcon Motorsports.

== Overview ==
The design process of the supercar according to the concept of American designer Jeff Lemke began in 2009, in parallel with the founding of Falcon Motorsports. The premiere of the vehicle was preceded by the debut of the pre-production prototype at the North American International Auto Show, and finally the production model, the F7, was presented at the same exhibition two years later.

Visually, the Falcon F7 was distinguished by an aggressively styled silhouette with a low-set front apron decorated with two wide air inlets and narrow, upturned headlights. The two-door, two-seater body was equipped with the function of a removable roof on the section from the glass to the seats.

The F7 was powered by a 7.0 L LS7 V8 engine, which had a capacity of 7 liters and a power of 629 HP, transferring power to the rear axle in cooperation with a 6-speed manual transmission. The car reached 0–60 mph (0–97 km/h) in 3.3 seconds, and the maximum speed was about 200 mph (320 km/h).

== Production ==
The Falcon F7 was a limited production car, with only 7 examples produced after its debut in 2012. At the time of its release, the price of the F7 was $225,000.
