= 2025 Shriners Children's 500 =

NASCAR Cup Series race

Race details
- Race 4 of 36 in the 2025 NASCAR Cup Series
- Date: March 9, 2025
- Location: Phoenix Raceway in Avondale, Arizona
- Course: Permanent racing facility
- Course length: 1.022 miles (1.645 km)
- Distance: 312 laps, 312 mi (502.115 km)
- Average speed: 92.141 miles per hour (148.287 km/h)

Pole position
Driver	William Byron	Hendrick Motorsports
- Time: 26.930

Most laps led
Driver	Christopher Bell	Joe Gibbs Racing
- Laps: 105

Fastest lap
Driver	Michael McDowell	Spire Motorsports
- Time: 27.020

Winner
No. 20	Christopher Bell	Joe Gibbs Racing

Television in the United States
- Network: FS1
- Announcers: Mike Joy, Clint Bowyer, and Kevin Harvick
- Nielsen ratings: 2.818 million

Radio in the United States
- Radio: MRN
- Booth announcers: Alex Hayden, Mike Bagley, and Todd Gordon
- Turn announcers: Dan Hubbard (1 & 2) and Tim Catafalmo (3 & 4)

The 2025 Shriners Children's 500 was a NASCAR Cup Series race held on March 9, 2025, at Phoenix Raceway in Avondale, Arizona. Contested over 312 laps on the one mile (1.6 km) oval, it was the fourth race of the 2025 NASCAR Cup Series season.

Christopher Bell won the race. Denny Hamlin finished 2nd, and Kyle Larson finished 3rd. Josh Berry and Chris Buescher rounded out the top five, and William Byron, Alex Bowman, Kyle Busch, Zane Smith, and Chase Elliott rounded out the top ten.

== Report ==
=== Background ===
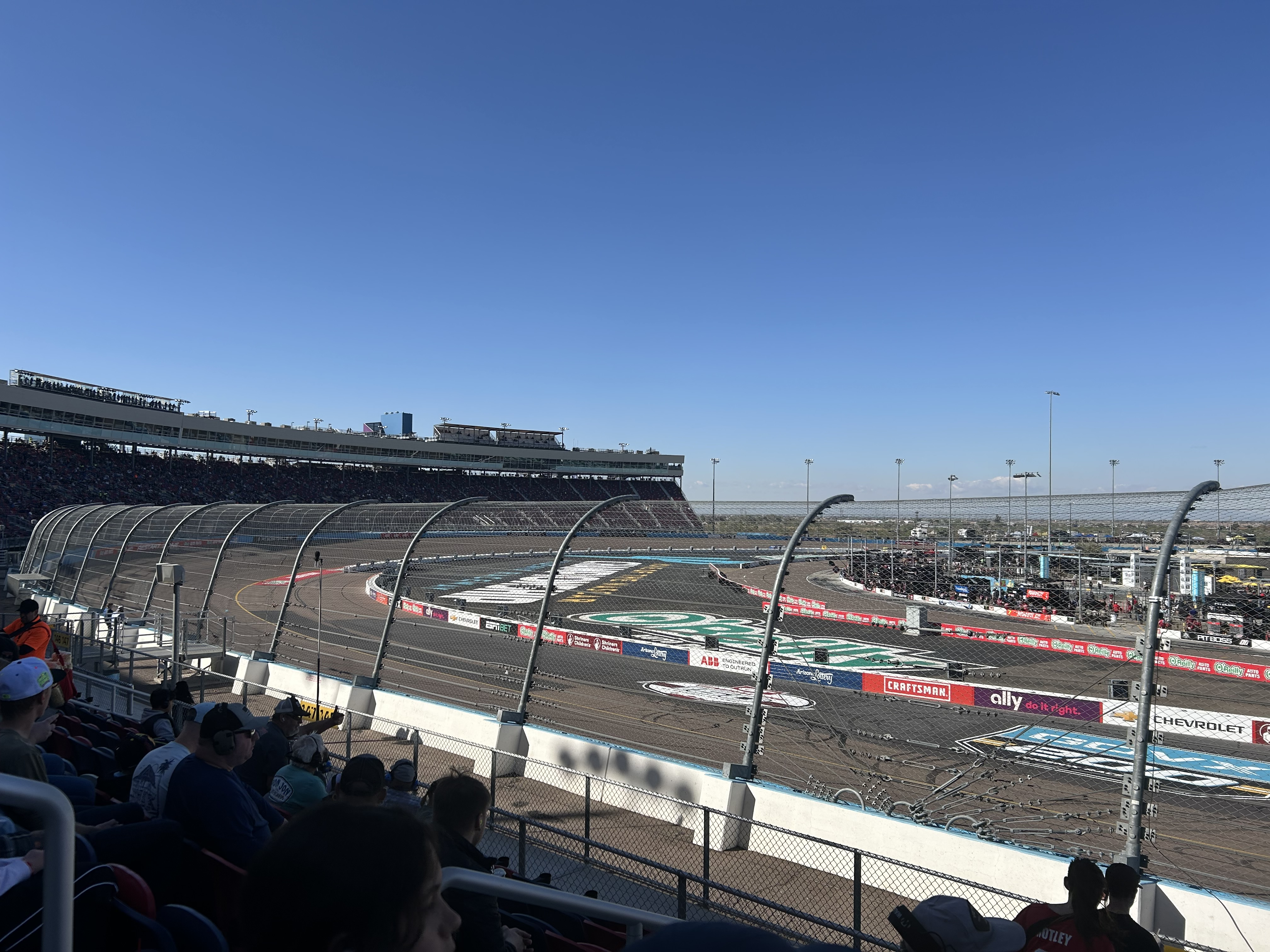
Phoenix Raceway, the track where the race was held.

Phoenix Raceway is a 1-mile, low-banked tri-oval race track located in Avondale, Arizona, near Phoenix. The motorsport track opened in 1964 and currently hosts two NASCAR race weekends annually including the final championship race since 2020. Phoenix Raceway has also hosted the CART, IndyCar Series, USAC and the WeatherTech SportsCar Championship. The raceway is currently owned and operated by NASCAR.

On January 22, 2025, NASCAR, along with Goodyear, announced the option tire will be used for the spring race at Phoenix. The option tire was previously used during the 2024 NASCAR All-Star Race and the Richmond summer race.

==== Entry list ====
- (R) denotes rookie driver.
- (i) denotes driver who is ineligible for series driver points.

No.	Driver	Team	Manufacturer
1	Ross Chastain	Trackhouse Racing	Chevrolet
2	Austin Cindric	Team Penske	Ford
3	Austin Dillon	Richard Childress Racing	Chevrolet
4	Noah Gragson	Front Row Motorsports	Ford
5	Kyle Larson	Hendrick Motorsports	Chevrolet
6	Brad Keselowski	RFK Racing	Ford
7	Justin Haley	Spire Motorsports	Chevrolet
8	Kyle Busch	Richard Childress Racing	Chevrolet
9	Chase Elliott	Hendrick Motorsports	Chevrolet
10	Ty Dillon	Kaulig Racing	Chevrolet
11	Denny Hamlin	Joe Gibbs Racing	Toyota
12	Ryan Blaney	Team Penske	Ford
16	A. J. Allmendinger	Kaulig Racing	Chevrolet
17	Chris Buescher	RFK Racing	Ford
19	Chase Briscoe	Joe Gibbs Racing	Toyota
20	Christopher Bell	Joe Gibbs Racing	Toyota
21	Josh Berry	Wood Brothers Racing	Ford
22	Joey Logano	Team Penske	Ford
23	Bubba Wallace	23XI Racing	Toyota
24	William Byron	Hendrick Motorsports	Chevrolet
34	Todd Gilliland	Front Row Motorsports	Ford
35	Riley Herbst (R)	23XI Racing	Toyota
38	Zane Smith	Front Row Motorsports	Ford
41	Cole Custer	Haas Factory Team	Ford
42	John Hunter Nemechek	Legacy Motor Club	Toyota
43	Erik Jones	Legacy Motor Club	Toyota
45	Tyler Reddick	23XI Racing	Toyota
47	Ricky Stenhouse Jr.	Hyak Motorsports	Chevrolet
48	Alex Bowman	Hendrick Motorsports	Chevrolet
51	Cody Ware	Rick Ware Racing	Ford
54	Ty Gibbs	Joe Gibbs Racing	Toyota
60	Ryan Preece	RFK Racing	Ford
71	Michael McDowell	Spire Motorsports	Chevrolet
77	Carson Hocevar	Spire Motorsports	Chevrolet
78	Katherine Legge	Live Fast Motorsports	Chevrolet
88	Shane van Gisbergen (R)	Trackhouse Racing	Chevrolet
99	Daniel Suárez	Trackhouse Racing	Chevrolet
Official entry list

== Practice ==
Carson Hocevar was the fastest in the practice session with a time of 27.163 seconds and a speed of 132.533 mph (213.291 km/h).

=== Practice results ===
Pos	No.	Driver	Team	Manufacturer	Time	Speed
1	77	Carson Hocevar	Spire Motorsports	Chevrolet	27.163	132.533
2	71	Michael McDowell	Spire Motorsports	Chevrolet	27.165	132.523
3	45	Tyler Reddick	23XI Racing	Toyota	27.170	132.499
Official practice results

== Qualifying ==
William Byron scored the pole for the race with a time of 26.930 and a speed of 133.680 mph (215.137 km/h).

=== Qualifying results ===
Pos	No.	Driver	Team	Manufacturer	Time	Speed
1	24	William Byron	Hendrick Motorsports	Chevrolet	26.930	133.680
2	22	Joey Logano	Team Penske	Ford	27.028	133.195
3	77	Carson Hocevar	Spire Motorsports	Chevrolet	27.043	133.121
4	21	Josh Berry	Wood Brothers Racing	Ford	27.088	132.900
5	43	Erik Jones	Legacy Motor Club	Toyota	27.091	132.885
6	9	Chase Elliott	Hendrick Motorsports	Chevrolet	27.099	132.846
7	71	Michael McDowell	Spire Motorsports	Chevrolet	27.099	132.846
8	7	Justin Haley	Spire Motorsports	Chevrolet	27.111	132.787
9	45	Tyler Reddick	23XI Racing	Toyota	27.113	132.778
10	11	Denny Hamlin	Joe Gibbs Racing	Toyota	27.150	132.597
11	20	Christopher Bell	Joe Gibbs Racing	Toyota	27.153	132.582
12	12	Ryan Blaney	Team Penske	Ford	27.157	132.563
13	17	Chris Buescher	RFK Racing	Ford	27.168	132.509
14	2	Austin Cindric	Team Penske	Ford	27.170	132.499
15	8	Kyle Busch	Richard Childress Racing	Chevrolet	27.189	132.406
16	16	A. J. Allmendinger	Kaulig Racing	Chevrolet	27.221	132.251
17	5	Kyle Larson	Hendrick Motorsports	Chevrolet	27.222	132.246
18	35	Riley Herbst (R)	23XI Racing	Toyota	27.226	132.227
19	23	Bubba Wallace	23XI Racing	Toyota	27.258	132.071
20	6	Brad Keselowski	RFK Racing	Ford	27.284	131.945
21	3	Austin Dillon	Richard Childress Racing	Chevrolet	27.322	131.762
22	47	Ricky Stenhouse Jr.	Hyak Motorsports	Chevrolet	27.334	131.704
23	41	Cole Custer	Haas Factory Team	Ford	27.340	131.675
24	1	Ross Chastain	Trackhouse Racing	Chevrolet	27.350	131.627
25	10	Ty Dillon	Kaulig Racing	Chevrolet	27.364	131.560
26	38	Zane Smith	Front Row Motorsports	Ford	27.372	131.521
27	34	Todd Gilliland	Front Row Motorsports	Ford	27.458	131.109
28	60	Ryan Preece	RFK Racing	Ford	27.464	131.081
29	88	Shane van Gisbergen (R)	Trackhouse Racing	Chevrolet	27.480	131.004
30	19	Chase Briscoe	Joe Gibbs Racing	Toyota	27.520	130.814
31	99	Daniel Suárez	Trackhouse Racing	Chevrolet	27.555	130.648
32	48	Alex Bowman	Hendrick Motorsports	Chevrolet	27.647	130.213
33	4	Noah Gragson	Front Row Motorsports	Ford	27.660	130.152
34	54	Ty Gibbs	Joe Gibbs Racing	Toyota	27.681	130.053
35	51	Cody Ware	Rick Ware Racing	Ford	27.826	129.375
36	42	John Hunter Nemechek	Legacy Motor Club	Toyota	27.842	129.301
37	78	Katherine Legge	Live Fast Motorsports	Chevrolet	28.060	128.297
Official qualifying results

== Race ==
=== Race results ===
==== Stage Results ====
Stage One Laps: 60

Pos	No	Driver	Team	Manufacturer	Points
1	24	William Byron	Hendrick Motorsports	Chevrolet	10
2	45	Tyler Reddick	23XI Racing	Toyota	9
3	60	Ryan Preece	RFK Racing	Ford	8
4	20	Christopher Bell	Joe Gibbs Racing	Toyota	7
5	12	Ryan Blaney	Team Penske	Ford	6
6	21	Josh Berry	Wood Brothers Racing	Ford	5
7	77	Carson Hocevar	Spire Motorsports	Chevrolet	4
8	11	Denny Hamlin	Joe Gibbs Racing	Toyota	3
9	9	Chase Elliott	Hendrick Motorsports	Chevrolet	2
10	5	Kyle Larson	Hendrick Motorsports	Chevrolet	1
Official stage one results

Stage Two Laps: 125

Pos	No	Driver	Team	Manufacturer	Points
1	20	Christopher Bell	Joe Gibbs Racing	Toyota	10
2	22	Joey Logano	Team Penske	Ford	9
3	24	William Byron	Hendrick Motorsports	Chevrolet	8
4	12	Ryan Blaney	Team Penske	Ford	7
5	45	Tyler Reddick	23XI Racing	Toyota	6
6	11	Denny Hamlin	Joe Gibbs Racing	Toyota	5
7	2	Austin Cindric	Team Penske	Ford	4
8	99	Daniel Suárez	Trackhouse Racing	Chevrolet	3
9	5	Kyle Larson	Hendrick Motorsports	Chevrolet	2
10	21	Josh Berry	Wood Brothers Racing	Ford	1
Official stage two results

=== Final Stage Results ===
Stage Three Laps: 127

Pos	Grid	No	Driver	Team	Manufacturer	Laps	Points
1	11	20	Christopher Bell	Joe Gibbs Racing	Toyota	312	57
2	10	11	Denny Hamlin	Joe Gibbs Racing	Toyota	312	43
3	17	5	Kyle Larson	Hendrick Motorsports	Chevrolet	312	37
4	4	21	Josh Berry	Wood Brothers Racing	Ford	312	39
5	13	17	Chris Buescher	RFK Racing	Ford	312	32
6	1	24	William Byron	Hendrick Motorsports	Chevrolet	312	49
7	32	48	Alex Bowman	Hendrick Motorsports	Chevrolet	312	30
8	15	8	Kyle Busch	Richard Childress Racing	Chevrolet	312	29
9	26	38	Zane Smith	Front Row Motorsports	Ford	312	28
10	6	9	Chase Elliott	Hendrick Motorsports	Chevrolet	312	29
11	24	1	Ross Chastain	Trackhouse Racing	Chevrolet	312	26
12	21	3	Austin Dillon	Richard Childress Racing	Chevrolet	312	25
13	2	22	Joey Logano	Team Penske	Ford	312	33
14	36	42	John Hunter Nemechek	Legacy Motor Club	Toyota	312	23
15	28	60	Ryan Preece	RFK Racing	Ford	312	30
16	25	10	Ty Dillon	Kaulig Racing	Chevrolet	312	21
17	27	34	Todd Gilliland	Front Row Motorsports	Ford	312	20
18	5	43	Erik Jones	Legacy Motor Club	Toyota	312	19
19	14	2	Austin Cindric	Team Penske	Ford	312	22
20	9	45	Tyler Reddick	23XI Racing	Toyota	312	32
21	22	47	Ricky Stenhouse Jr.	Hyak Motorsports	Chevrolet	311	16
22	16	16	A. J. Allmendinger	Kaulig Racing	Chevrolet	311	15
23	31	99	Daniel Suárez	Trackhouse Racing	Chevrolet	308	17
24	35	51	Cody Ware	Rick Ware Racing	Ford	306	13
25	34	54	Ty Gibbs	Joe Gibbs Racing	Toyota	304	12
26	33	4	Noah Gragson	Front Row Motorsports	Ford	303	11
27	7	71	Michael McDowell	Spire Motorsports	Chevrolet	290	11
28	12	12	Ryan Blaney	Team Penske	Ford	289	22
29	19	23	Bubba Wallace	23XI Racing	Toyota	264	8
30	37	78	Katherine Legge	Live Fast Motorsports	Chevrolet	210	7
31	29	88	Shane van Gisbergen (R)	Trackhouse Racing	Chevrolet	100	6
32	23	41	Cole Custer	Haas Factory Team	Ford	99	5
33	20	6	Brad Keselowski	RFK Racing	Ford	99	4
34	8	7	Justin Haley	Spire Motorsports	Chevrolet	98	3
35	30	19	Chase Briscoe	Joe Gibbs Racing	Toyota	98	2
36	3	77	Carson Hocevar	Spire Motorsports	Chevrolet	98	5
37	18	35	Riley Herbst (R)	23XI Racing	Toyota	98	1
Official race results

=== Race statistics ===
- Lead changes: 17 among 6 different drivers
- Cautions/Laps: 10 for 73
- Red flags: 0
- Time of race: 3 hours, 23 minutes and 10 seconds
- Average speed: 92.141 miles per hour (148.287 km/h)

== Media ==
=== Television ===
Fox Sports covered the race at the Phoenix Raceway. Mike Joy, Clint Bowyer, and nine-time Phoenix winner Kevin Harvick called the race from the broadcast booth. Jamie Little and Regan Smith handled pit road for the television side, and Larry McReynolds provided insight on-site during the race.

FS1
Booth announcers	Pit reporters	In-race analyst
Lap-by-lap: Mike Joy; Color-commentator: Clint Bowyer; Color-commentator: Kevin Harvick	Jamie Little; Regan Smith	Larry McReynolds

=== Radio ===
MRN covered the radio action for the race which was also simulcasted on Sirius XM NASCAR Radio. Alex Hayden, Mike Bagley, and former crew chief Todd Gordon called the race when the field races past the start/finish line. Dan Hubbard called the action from turns 1 & 2, and Tim Catafalmo called the action from turns 3 & 4. Pit lane was manned by Lead MRN Pit Reporter Steve Post, Chris Wilner, and Jacklyn Drake.

MRN
Booth announcers	Turn announcers	Pit reporters
Lead announcer: Alex Hayden; Announcer: Mike Bagley; Announcer: Todd Gordon	Turns 1 & 2: Dan Hubbard; Turns 3 & 4: Tim Catafalmo	Steve Post; Chris Wilner; Jacklyn Drake

== Standings after the race ==
Drivers' Championship standings

	Pos	Driver	Points
	1	William Byron	165
2	2	Christopher Bell	152 (–13)
	3	Tyler Reddick	143 (–22)
2	4	Ryan Blaney	136 (–29)
	5	Chase Elliott	124 (–41)
1	6	Alex Bowman	117 (–48)
10	7	Denny Hamlin	110 (–55)
1	8	Kyle Busch	110 (–55)
3	9	Joey Logano	110 (–55)
1	10	Chris Buescher	109 (–56)
5	11	Kyle Larson	108 (–57)
6	12	Bubba Wallace	102 (–63)
	13	John Hunter Nemechek	99 (–66)
4	14	Ricky Stenhouse Jr.	96 (–69)
7	15	Michael McDowell	96 (–69)
4	16	Ross Chastain	88 (–77)
Official driver's standings

Manufacturers' Championship standings

Pos	Manufacturer	Points
1	Toyota	155
2	Chevrolet	144 (–11)
3	Ford	126 (–29)

- Note: Only the first 16 positions are included for the driver standings.

Previous race: 2025 EchoPark Automotive Grand Prix	NASCAR Cup Series; 2025 season	Next race: 2025 Pennzoil 400
