= 2023 BitNile.com Grand Prix of Portland =

Indycar race held in Portland, Oregon

(United States) 2023 BitNile.com Grand Prix of Portland
Race details
16th round of the 2023 IndyCar season
| ← Previous race | Next race → |
- Layout of the Portland International Raceway
- Date: September 3, 2023
- Official name: BitNile.com Grand Prix of Portland
- Location: Portland International Raceway, Portland, Oregon
- Course: Permanent road course 1.964 mi / 3.161 km
- Distance: 110 laps 216.04 mi / 347.68 km

Pole position
- Driver: (United States) Graham Rahal (Rahal Letterman Lanigan Racing)
- Time: 00:58.3195

Fastest lap
- Driver: (United States) Josef Newgarden (Team Penske)
- Time: 00:59.3817 (on lap 28 of 110)

Podium
- First: (Spain) Álex Palou (Chip Ganassi Racing)
- Second: (Sweden) Felix Rosenqvist (Arrow McLaren)
- Third: (New Zealand) Scott Dixon (Chip Ganassi Racing)

Chronology
| Previous | Next |
|---|---|
| 2022 | 2024 |

The 2023 BitNile.com Grand Prix of Portland was the penultimate round of the 2023 IndyCar season. The race was held on September 3, 2023, in Portland, Oregon at the Portland International Raceway; and was won for a second time by Álex Palou who qualified fifth and led 69 of 110 laps in his Chip Ganassi Racing number 10 Honda.

Arrow McLaren's Felix Rosenqvist finished second while Palou's veteran teammate Scott Dixon came in third. Graham Rahal qualified on the pole and finished twelfth.

By virtue of his race win, Palou wrapped up the championship before the final race of the season, a feat last accomplished by Sébastien Bourdais when he won the 2007 Champ Car championship in the penultimate race.

== Entry list ==
| Key | Meaning |
|---|---|
| R | Rookie |
| W | Past winner |

| No. | Driver | Team | Engine |
|---|---|---|---|
| 2 | (United States) Josef Newgarden | Team Penske | Chevrolet |
| 3 | (New Zealand) Scott McLaughlin W | Team Penske | Chevrolet |
| 5 | (Mexico) Pato O'Ward | Arrow McLaren | Chevrolet |
| 06 | (Brazil) Hélio Castroneves | Meyer Shank Racing | Honda |
| 6 | (Sweden) Felix Rosenqvist | Arrow McLaren | Chevrolet |
| 7 | (United States) Alexander Rossi | Arrow McLaren | Chevrolet |
| 8 | (Sweden) Marcus Ericsson | Chip Ganassi Racing | Honda |
| 9 | (New Zealand) Scott Dixon | Chip Ganassi Racing | Honda |
| 10 | (Spain) Álex Palou W | Chip Ganassi Racing | Honda |
| 11 | (New Zealand) Marcus Armstrong R | Chip Ganassi Racing | Honda |
| 12 | (Australia) Will Power W | Team Penske | Chevrolet |
| 14 | (United States) Santino Ferrucci | A. J. Foyt Enterprises | Chevrolet |
| 15 | (United States) Graham Rahal | Rahal Letterman Lanigan Racing | Honda |
| 18 | (United States) David Malukas | Dale Coyne Racing with HMD Motorsports | Honda |
| 20 | (United States) Ryan Hunter-Reay | Ed Carpenter Racing | Chevrolet |
| 21 | (Netherlands) Rinus VeeKay | Ed Carpenter Racing | Chevrolet |
| 26 | (United States) Colton Herta | Andretti Autosport with Curb-Agajanian | Honda |
| 27 | (United States) Kyle Kirkwood | Andretti Autosport | Honda |
| 28 | (France) Romain Grosjean | Andretti Autosport | Honda |
| 29 | (Canada) Devlin DeFrancesco | Andretti Steinbrenner Autosport | Honda |
| 30 | (Estonia) Jüri Vips R | Rahal Letterman Lanigan Racing | Honda |
| 45 | (Denmark) Christian Lundgaard | Rahal Letterman Lanigan Racing | Honda |
| 51 | (United States) Sting Ray Robb R | Dale Coyne Racing with Rick Ware Racing | Honda |
| 55 | (Denmark) Benjamin Pedersen R | A. J. Foyt Enterprises | Chevrolet |
| 60 | (United Kingdom) Tom Blomqvist R | Meyer Shank Racing | Honda |
| 77 | (United Kingdom) Callum Ilott | Juncos Hollinger Racing | Chevrolet |
| 78 | (Argentina) Agustín Canapino R | Juncos Hollinger Racing | Chevrolet |

== Practice ==
=== Practice 1 ===
Top Practice Speeds
| Pos | No. | Driver | Team | Engine | Lap Time |
|---|---|---|---|---|---|
| 1 | 45 | (Denmark) Christian Lundgaard | Rahal Letterman Lanigan Racing | Honda | 00:58.1776 |
| 2 | 27 | (United States) Kyle Kirkwood | Andretti Autosport | Honda | 00:58.3246 |
| 3 | 10 | (Spain) Álex Palou W | Chip Ganassi Racing | Honda | 00:58.3555 |

=== Practice 2 ===
Top Practice Speeds
| Pos | No. | Driver | Team | Engine | Lap Time |
|---|---|---|---|---|---|
| 1 | 3 | (New Zealand) Scott McLaughlin W | Team Penske | Chevrolet | 00:58.1516 |
| 2 | 2 | (United States) Josef Newgarden | Team Penske | Chevrolet | 00:58.2695 |
| 3 | 9 | (New Zealand) Scott Dixon | Chip Ganassi Racing | Honda | 00:58.2785 |

== Qualifying ==
Qualifying started at 12:30 PM PT on September 2, 2023.

=== Qualifying classification ===
| Pos | No. | Driver | Team | Engine | Time | | | | Final grid |
| Pos | No. | Driver | Team | Engine | Round 1 | | Round 2 | Round 3 | Final grid |
| Pos | No. | Driver | Team | Engine | Group 1 | Group 2 | Round 2 | Round 3 | Final grid |
|---|---|---|---|---|---|---|---|---|---|
| 1 | 15 | (United States) Graham Rahal | Rahal Letterman Lanigan Racing | Honda | 00:58.1612 | N/A | 00:58.3248 | **00:58.3195** | 1 |
| 2 | 3 | (New Zealand) Scott McLaughlin **W** | Team Penske | Chevrolet | N/A | 00:58.0525 | **00:58.0777** | 00:58.3525 | 2 |
| 3 | 26 | (United States) Colton Herta | Andretti Autosport with Curb-Agajanian | Honda | 00:58.0843 | N/A | 00:58.2338 | 00:58.4576 | 3 |
| 4 | 9 | (New Zealand) Scott Dixon | Chip Ganassi Racing | Honda | N/A | 00:58.3701 | 00:58.2653 | 00:58.5803 | 4 |
| 5 | 10 | (Spain) Álex Palou **W** | Chip Ganassi Racing | Honda | N/A | **00:57.9651** | 00:58.3232 | 00:58.6492 | 5 |
| 6 | 5 | (Mexico) Pato O'Ward | Arrow McLaren | Chevrolet | N/A | 00:58.1025 | 00:58.2579 | 00:58.6737 | 6 |
| 7 | 12 | (Australia) Will Power **W** | Team Penske | Chevrolet | 00:58.1913 | N/A | 00:58.3779 | N/A | 7 |
| 8 | 77 | (United Kingdom) Callum Ilott | Juncos Hollinger Racing | Chevrolet | 00:58.3075 | N/A | 00:58.4973 | N/A | 8 |
| 9 | 7 | (United States) Alexander Rossi | Arrow McLaren | Chevrolet | N/A | 00:58.4637 | 00:58.5023 | N/A | 9 |
| 10 | 8 | (Sweden) Marcus Ericsson | Chip Ganassi Racing | Honda | N/A | 00:58.5952 | 00:58.5479 | N/A | 10 |
| 11 | 6 | (Sweden) Felix Rosenqvist | Arrow McLaren | Chevrolet | **00:57.8967** | N/A | 00:59.3053 | N/A | 11 |
| 12 | 2 | (United States) Josef Newgarden | Team Penske | Chevrolet | 00:58.0890 | N/A | No Time | N/A | 12 |
| 13 | 21 | (Netherlands) Rinus VeeKay | Ed Carpenter Racing | Chevrolet | 00:58.3240 | N/A | N/A | N/A | 13 |
| 14 | 11 | (New Zealand) Marcus Armstrong **R** | Chip Ganassi Racing | Honda | N/A | 00:58.6652 | N/A | N/A | 14 |
| 15 | 28 | (France) Romain Grosjean | Andretti Autosport | Honda | 00:58.3522 | N/A | N/A | N/A | 15 |
| 16 | 27 | (United States) Kyle Kirkwood | Andretti Autosport | Honda | N/A | 00:58.6835 | N/A | N/A | 16 |
| 17 | 45 | (Denmark) Christian Lundgaard | Rahal Letterman Lanigan Racing | Honda | 00:58.3678 | N/A | N/A | N/A | 17 |
| 18 | 30 | (Estonia) Jüri Vips **R** | Rahal Letterman Lanigan Racing | Honda | N/A | 00:58.7454 | N/A | N/A | 18 |
| 19 | 20 | (United States) Ryan Hunter-Reay | Ed Carpenter Racing | Chevrolet | 00:58.6529 | N/A | N/A | N/A | 25 (Note: Ryan Hunter-Reay received a six-place grid penalty due to an unapproved engine change after the Bommarito 500.) |
| 20 | 78 | (Argentina) Agustín Canapino **R** | Juncos Hollinger Racing | Chevrolet | N/A | 00:58.7753 | N/A | N/A | 19 |
| 21 | 29 | (Canada) Devlin DeFrancesco | Andretti Steinbrenner Autosport | Honda | 00:58.6748 | N/A | N/A | N/A | 20 |
| 22 | 06 | (Brazil) Hélio Castroneves | Meyer Shank Racing | Honda | N/A | 00:58.8006 | N/A | N/A | 21 |
| 23 | 14 | (United States) Santino Ferrucci | A. J. Foyt Enterprises | Chevrolet | 00:59.0633 | N/A | N/A | N/A | 22 |
| 24 | 18 | (United States) David Malukas | Dale Coyne Racing with HMD Motorsports | Honda | N/A | 00:58.9016 | N/A | N/A | 23 |
| 25 | 51 | (United States) Sting Ray Robb **R** | Dale Coyne Racing with Rick Ware Racing | Honda | 00:59.2642 | N/A | N/A | N/A | 24 |
| 26 | 55 | (Denmark) Benjamin Pedersen **R** | A. J. Foyt Enterprises | Chevrolet | N/A | 00:59.2175 | N/A | N/A | 26 |
| 27 | 60 | (United Kingdom) Tom Blomqvist **R** | Meyer Shank Racing | Honda | N/A | 00:59.4364 | N/A | N/A | 27 (Note: Tom Blomqvist received a six-place grid penalty due to an unapproved engine change after qualifying.) |

Notes

- **Bold text** indicates fastest time set in session.

== Warmup ==
Top Practice Speeds
| Pos | No. | Driver | Team | Engine | Lap Time |
|---|---|---|---|---|---|
| 1 | 2 | (United States) Josef Newgarden | Team Penske | Chevrolet | 00:59.4533 |
| 2 | 77 | (United Kingdom) Callum Ilott | Juncos Hollinger Racing | Chevrolet | 00:59.5342 |
| 3 | 10 | (Spain) Álex Palou W | Chip Ganassi Racing | Honda | 00:59.5716 |

== Race ==
The race started at 12:30 PM PT on September 3, 2023.

=== Race classification ===
| Pos | No. | Driver | Team | Engine | Laps | Time/Retired | Pit Stops | Grid | Laps Led | Pts. |
|---|---|---|---|---|---|---|---|---|---|---|
| 1 | 10 | (Spain) Álex Palou W | Chip Ganassi Racing | Honda | 110 | 01:57:01.9814 | 3 | 5 | 69 | 53 |
| 2 | 6 | (Sweden) Felix Rosenqvist | Arrow McLaren | Chevrolet | 110 | +5.4353 | 3 | 11 | 3 | 41 |
| 3 | 9 | (New Zealand) Scott Dixon | Chip Ganassi Racing | Honda | 110 | +8.0669 | 3 | 4 | 15 | 36 |
| 4 | 5 | (Mexico) Pato O'Ward | Arrow McLaren | Chevrolet | 110 | +19.0572 | 3 | 6 | | 32 |
| 5 | 2 | (United States) Josef Newgarden | Team Penske | Chevrolet | 110 | +21.0831 | 3 | 12 | | 30 |
| 6 | 21 | (Netherlands) Rinus VeeKay | Ed Carpenter Racing | Chevrolet | 110 | +21.8799 | 3 | 13 | | 28 |
| 7 | 8 | (Sweden) Marcus Ericsson | Chip Ganassi Racing | Honda | 110 | +30.5820 | 3 | 10 | | 26 |
| 8 | 18 | (United States) David Malukas | Dale Coyne Racing with HMD Motorsports | Honda | 110 | +32.6211 | 4 | 23 | 2 | 25 |
| 9 | 3 | (New Zealand) Scott McLaughlin W | Team Penske | Chevrolet | 110 | +33.0282 | 3 | 2 | | 22 |
| 10 | 27 | (United States) Kyle Kirkwood | Andretti Autosport | Honda | 110 | +33.7836 | 3 | 16 | | 20 |
| 11 | 45 | (Denmark) Christian Lundgaard | Rahal Letterman Lanigan Racing | Honda | 110 | +34.4757 | 3 | 17 | | 19 |
| 12 | 15 | (United States) Graham Rahal | Rahal Letterman Lanigan Racing | Honda | 110 | +38.6995 | 3 | 1 | 21 | 20 |
| 13 | 26 | (United States) Colton Herta | Andretti Autosport with Curb-Agajanian | Honda | 110 | +39.7582 | 4 | 3 | | 17 |
| 14 | 06 | (Brazil) Hélio Castroneves | Meyer Shank Racing | Honda | 100 | +40.3373 | 3 | 21 | | 16 |
| 15 | 77 | (United Kingdom) Callum Ilott | Juncos Hollinger Racing | Chevrolet | 110 | +40.4769 | 3 | 8 | | 15 |
| 16 | 14 | (United States) Santino Ferrucci | A. J. Foyt Enterprises | Chevrolet | 110 | +41.1279 | 3 | 22 | | 14 |
| 17 | 29 | (Canada) Devlin DeFrancesco | Andretti Steinbrenner Autosport | Honda | 110 | +42.5578 | 3 | 20 | | 13 |
| 18 | 30 | (Estonia) Jüri Vips R | Rahal Letterman Lanigan Racing | Honda | 109 | +1 Lap | 3 | 18 | | 12 |
| 19 | 11 | (New Zealand) Marcus Armstrong R | Chip Ganassi Racing | Honda | 109 | +1 Lap | 3 | 14 | | 11 |
| 20 | 7 | (United States) Alexander Rossi | Arrow McLaren | Chevrolet | 109 | +1 Lap | 4 | 9 | | 10 |
| 21 | 20 | (United States) Ryan Hunter-Reay | Ed Carpenter Racing | Chevrolet | 109 | +1 Lap | 4 | 25 | | 9 |
| 22 | 55 | (Denmark) Benjamin Pedersen R | A. J. Foyt Enterprises | Chevrolet | 109 | +1 Lap | 3 | 26 | | 8 |
| 23 | 51 | (United States) Sting Ray Robb R | Dale Coyne Racing with Rick Ware Racing | Honda | 109 | +1 Lap | 3 | 24 | | 7 |
| 24 | 60 | (United Kingdom) Tom Blomqvist R | Meyer Shank Racing | Honda | 109 | +1 Lap | 4 | 27 | | 6 |
| 25 | 12 | (Australia) Will Power W | Team Penske | Chevrolet | 108 | +2 Laps | 3 | 7 | | 5 |
| 26 | 78 | (Argentina) Agustín Canapino R | Juncos Hollinger Racing | Chevrolet | 82 | Mechanical | 3 | 19 | | 5 |
| 27 | 28 | (France) Romain Grosjean | Andretti Autosport | Honda | 31 | Contact | 2 | 15 | | 5 |
Fastest lap: (United States) Josef Newgarden (Team Penske) – 00:59.3817 (lap 28)

== Championship standings after the race ==
Drivers' Championship standings

| | Pos. | Driver | Points |
|---|---|---|---|
| Unchanged | 1 | (Spain) Álex Palou^ | 618 |
| Unchanged | 2 | (New Zealand) Scott Dixon | 527 |
| Unchanged | 3 | (United States) Josef Newgarden | 470 |
| Unchanged | 4 | (Mexico) Pato O'Ward | 461 |
| Unchanged | 5 | (New Zealand) Scott McLaughlin | 448 |

Engine manufacturer standings

| | Pos. | Manufacturer | Points |
|---|---|---|---|
| Unchanged | 1 | Honda | 1362 |
| Unchanged | 2 | Chevrolet | 1346 |

^ = clinched season championship

- Note: Only the top five positions are included.

== Footnotes ==
| Previous race: 2023 Bommarito Automotive Group 500 | NTT IndyCar Series; 2023 season | Next race: 2023 Firestone Grand Prix of Monterey |
| Previous race: 2022 Grand Prix of Portland | BitNile.com Grand Prix of Portland | Next race: 2024 Grand Prix of Portland |
