= 2023 Firestone Grand Prix of Monterey =

Indycar race held in Monterey, California

(United States) 2023 Firestone Grand Prix of Monterey
Race details
17th round of the 2023 IndyCar season
← Previous race
- Layout of the WeatherTech Raceway Laguna Seca
- Date: September 10, 2023
- Official name: Firestone Grand Prix of Monterey
- Location: WeatherTech Raceway Laguna Seca, Monterey, California
- Course: Permanent racing facility 2.238 mi / 3.602 km
- Distance: 95 laps 212.61 mi / 342.163 km

Pole position
- Driver: (Sweden) Felix Rosenqvist (Arrow McLaren)
- Time: 01:06.6416

Fastest lap
- Driver: (Spain) Álex Palou (Chip Ganassi Racing)
- Time: 01:08.4168 (on lap 52 of 95)

Podium
- First: (New Zealand) Scott Dixon (Chip Ganassi Racing)
- Second: (New Zealand) Scott McLaughlin (Team Penske)
- Third: (Spain) Álex Palou (Chip Ganassi Racing)

Chronology
Previous	Next
2022	2024

The 2023 Firestone Grand Prix of Monterey was the seventeenth and final round of the 2023 IndyCar season. The race was held on September 10, 2023, in Monterey, California at the WeatherTech Raceway Laguna Seca. The race consisted of 95 laps and was won by Scott Dixon.

Álex Palou entered the race having clinched the 2023 championship.

== Entry list ==
Key	Meaning
R	Rookie
W	Past winner

No.	Driver	Team	Engine
2	(United States) Josef Newgarden	Team Penske	Chevrolet
3	(New Zealand) Scott McLaughlin	Team Penske	Chevrolet
5	(Mexico) Pato O'Ward	Arrow McLaren	Chevrolet
06	(Brazil) Hélio Castroneves W	Meyer Shank Racing	Honda
6	(Sweden) Felix Rosenqvist	Arrow McLaren	Chevrolet
7	(United States) Alexander Rossi	Arrow McLaren	Chevrolet
8	(Sweden) Marcus Ericsson	Chip Ganassi Racing	Honda
9	(New Zealand) Scott Dixon	Chip Ganassi Racing	Honda
10	(Spain) Álex Palou W	Chip Ganassi Racing	Honda
11	(New Zealand) Marcus Armstrong R	Chip Ganassi Racing	Honda
12	(Australia) Will Power	Team Penske	Chevrolet
14	(United States) Santino Ferrucci	A. J. Foyt Enterprises	Chevrolet
15	(United States) Graham Rahal	Rahal Letterman Lanigan Racing	Honda
18	(United States) David Malukas	Dale Coyne Racing with HMD Motorsports	Honda
20	(United States) Ryan Hunter-Reay	Ed Carpenter Racing	Chevrolet
21	(Netherlands) Rinus VeeKay	Ed Carpenter Racing	Chevrolet
26	(United States) Colton Herta W	Andretti Autosport with Curb-Agajanian	Honda
27	(United States) Kyle Kirkwood	Andretti Autosport	Honda
28	(France) Romain Grosjean	Andretti Autosport	Honda
29	(Canada) Devlin DeFrancesco	Andretti Steinbrenner Autosport	Honda
30	(Estonia) Jüri Vips R	Rahal Letterman Lanigan Racing	Honda
45	(Denmark) Christian Lundgaard	Rahal Letterman Lanigan Racing	Honda
51	(United States) Sting Ray Robb R	Dale Coyne Racing with Rick Ware Racing	Honda
55	(Denmark) Benjamin Pedersen R	A. J. Foyt Enterprises	Chevrolet
60	(United Kingdom) Tom Blomqvist R	Meyer Shank Racing	Honda
77	(United Kingdom) Callum Ilott	Juncos Hollinger Racing	Chevrolet
78	(Argentina) Agustín Canapino R	Juncos Hollinger Racing	Chevrolet

== Practice ==
=== Practice 1 ===
Top Practice Speeds
Pos	No.	Driver	Team	Engine	Lap Time
1	26	(United States) Colton Herta W	Andretti Autosport with Curb-Agajanian	Honda	01:07.5382
2	5	(Mexico) Pato O'Ward	Arrow McLaren	Chevrolet	01:07.5911
3	7	(United States) Alexander Rossi	Arrow McLaren	Chevrolet	01:07.6336

=== Practice 2 ===
Top Practice Speeds
Pos	No.	Driver	Team	Engine	Lap Time
1	45	(Denmark) Christian Lundgaard	Rahal Letterman Lanigan Racing	Honda	01:07.6154
2	21	(Netherlands) Rinus VeeKay	Ed Carpenter Racing	Chevrolet	01:07.6546
3	10	(Spain) Álex Palou W	Chip Ganassi Racing	Honda	01:07.7993

== Qualifying ==
Qualifying started at 2:00 PM PT on September 9, 2023.

=== Qualifying classification ===
Pos	No.	Driver	Team	Engine	Time				Final grid
Pos	No.	Driver	Team	Engine	Round 1		Round 2	Round 3	Final grid
Pos	No.	Driver	Team	Engine	Group 1	Group 2	Round 2	Round 3	Final grid
1	6	(Sweden) Felix Rosenqvist	Arrow McLaren	Chevrolet	01:07.2403	N/A	01:06.7574	**01:06.6416**	1
2	3	(New Zealand) Scott McLaughlin	Team Penske	Chevrolet	N/A	01:06.8761	01:06.5662	01:06.6513	2
3	45	(Denmark) Christian Lundgaard	Rahal Letterman Lanigan Racing	Honda	N/A	01:06.8777	**01:06.4610**	01:06.7478	3
4	2	(United States) Josef Newgarden	Team Penske	Chevrolet	N/A	01:07.1254	01:06.7824	01:06.7937	4
5	9	(New Zealand) Scott Dixon	Chip Ganassi Racing	Honda	**01:07.0002**	N/A	01:06.7786	01:07.0171	11 (Note: Scott Dixon, Santino Ferrucci and rookies Jüri Vips and Agustín Canapino each received a six-place grid penalty due to unapproved engine change throughout the weekend.)
6	10	(Spain) Álex Palou **W**	Chip Ganassi Racing	Honda	N/A	01:07.1605	01:06.6158	01:07.2846	5
7	30	(Estonia) Jüri Vips **R**	Rahal Letterman Lanigan Racing	Honda	01:07.1305	N/A	01:06.8300	N/A	13
8	21	(Netherlands) Rinus VeeKay	Ed Carpenter Racing	Chevrolet	01:07.2675	N/A	01:06.9172	N/A	6
9	12	(Australia) Will Power	Team Penske	Chevrolet	N/A	01:07.1686	01:06.9282	N/A	7
10	28	(France) Romain Grosjean	Andretti Autosport	Honda	01:07.0668	N/A	01:07.1292	N/A	8
11	14	(United States) Santino Ferrucci	A. J. Foyt Enterprises	Chevrolet	01:07.1470	N/A	01:07.4479	N/A	17
12	5	(Mexico) Pato O'Ward	Arrow McLaren	Chevrolet	N/A	**01:06.8459**	01:07.9392	N/A	9
13	78	(Argentina) Agustín Canapino **R**	Juncos Hollinger Racing	Chevrolet	01:07.4009	N/A	N/A	N/A	19
14	15	(United States) Graham Rahal	Rahal Letterman Lanigan Racing	Honda	N/A	01:07.2323	N/A	N/A	10
15	26	(United States) Colton Herta **W**	Andretti Autosport with Curb-Agajanian	Honda	01:07.4666	N/A	N/A	N/A	12
16	11	(New Zealand) Marcus Armstrong **R**	Chip Ganassi Racing	Honda	N/A	01:07.3726	N/A	N/A	14
17	7	(United States) Alexander Rossi	Arrow McLaren	Chevrolet	01:07.5425	N/A	N/A	N/A	15
18	27	(United States) Kyle Kirkwood	Andretti Autosport	Honda	N/A	01:07.4029	N/A	N/A	16
19	8	(Sweden) Marcus Ericsson	Chip Ganassi Racing	Honda	01:07.6149	N/A	N/A	N/A	18
20	77	(United Kingdom) Callum Ilott	Juncos Hollinger Racing	Chevrolet	N/A	01:07.5183	N/A	N/A	20
21	60	(United Kingdom) Tom Blomqvist **R**	Meyer Shank Racing	Honda	01:07.7419	N/A	N/A	N/A	21
22	18	(United States) David Malukas	Dale Coyne Racing with HMD Motorsports	Honda	N/A	01:07.7816	N/A	N/A	22
23	55	(Denmark) Benjamin Pedersen **R**	A. J. Foyt Enterprises	Chevrolet	01:07.7583	N/A	N/A	N/A	23
24	51	(United States) Sting Ray Robb **R**	Dale Coyne Racing with Rick Ware Racing	Honda	N/A	01:07.8639	N/A	N/A	24
25	20	(United States) Ryan Hunter-Reay	Ed Carpenter Racing	Chevrolet	01:11.0620	N/A	N/A	N/A	25
26	29	(Canada) Devlin DeFrancesco	Andretti Steinbrenner Autosport	Honda	N/A	01:07.9083	N/A	N/A	26
27	06	(Brazil) Hélio Castroneves **W**	Meyer Shank Racing	Honda	N/A	No Time	N/A	N/A	27

Notes

- **Bold text** indicates fastest time set in session.

== Warmup ==
Top Practice Speeds
Pos	No.	Driver	Team	Engine	Lap Time
1	27	(United States) Kyle Kirkwood	Andretti Autosport	Honda	01:07.8939
2	8	(Sweden) Marcus Ericsson	Chip Ganassi Racing	Honda	01:08.0855
3	78	(Argentina) Agustín Canapino R	Juncos Hollinger Racing	Chevrolet	01:08.0856

== Race ==
The race started at 11:30 PM PT on September 10, 2023.

=== Race classification ===
Pos	No.	Driver	Team	Engine	Laps	Time/Retired	Pit Stops	Grid	Laps Led	Pts.
1	9	(New Zealand) Scott Dixon	Chip Ganassi Racing	Honda	95	02:17:41.6400	3	11	20	51
2	3	(New Zealand) Scott McLaughlin	Team Penske	Chevrolet	95	+7.3180	4	2		40
3	10	(Spain) Álex Palou W	Chip Ganassi Racing	Honda	95	+10.6111	2	5	51	38
4	12	(Australia) Will Power	Team Penske	Chevrolet	95	+14.6669	4	7		32
5	77	(United Kingdom) Callum Ilott	Juncos Hollinger Racing	Chevrolet	95	+21.1289	6	20		30
6	45	(Denmark) Christian Lundgaard	Rahal Letterman Lanigan Racing	Honda	95	+21.3750	5	3		28
7	7	(United States) Alexander Rossi	Arrow McLaren	Chevrolet	95	+22.2153	4	15		26
8	11	(New Zealand) Marcus Armstrong R	Chip Ganassi Racing	Honda	95	+27.1310	4	14		24
9	5	(Mexico) Pato O'Ward	Arrow McLaren	Chevrolet	95	+28.3907	3	9	15	23
10	20	(United States) Ryan Hunter-Reay	Ed Carpenter Racing	Chevrolet	95	+32.3407	3	25		20
11	28	(France) Romain Grosjean	Andretti Autosport	Honda	95	+39.0207	3	8	2	20
12	51	(United States) Sting Ray Robb R	Dale Coyne Racing with Rick Ware Racing	Honda	95	+43.9875	3	24		18
13	06	(Brazil) Hélio Castroneves W	Meyer Shank Racing	Honda	95	+58.3175	4	27		17
14	78	(Argentina) Agustín Canapino R	Juncos Hollinger Racing	Chevrolet	95	+61.1843	2	19		16
15	8	(Sweden) Marcus Ericsson	Chip Ganassi Racing	Honda	94	+1 Lap	5	18		15
16	55	(Denmark) Benjamin Pedersen R	A. J. Foyt Enterprises	Chevrolet	94	+1 Lap	6	23		14
17	14	(United States) Santino Ferrucci	A. J. Foyt Enterprises	Chevrolet	94	+1 Lap	5	17		13
18	21	(Netherlands) Rinus VeeKay	Ed Carpenter Racing	Chevrolet	93	+2 Laps	5	6		12
19	6	(Sweden) Felix Rosenqvist	Arrow McLaren	Chevrolet	93	+2 Laps	5	1	6	13
20	18	(United States) David Malukas	Dale Coyne Racing with HMD Motorsports	Honda	93	+2 Laps	5	22		10
21	2	(United States) Josef Newgarden	Team Penske	Chevrolet	91	+4 Laps	9	4		9
22	29	(Canada) Devlin DeFrancesco	Andretti Steinbrenner Autosport	Honda	91	+4 Laps	4	26		8
23	26	(United States) Colton Herta W	Andretti Autosport with Curb-Agajanian	Honda	80	Contact	5	12	1	8
24	30	(Estonia) Jüri Vips R	Rahal Letterman Lanigan Racing	Honda	71	+24 Laps	3	13		6
25	27	(United States) Kyle Kirkwood	Andretti Autosport	Honda	65	+30 Laps	3	16		5
26	60	(United Kingdom) Tom Blomqvist R	Meyer Shank Racing	Honda	61	Contact	2	21		5
27	15	(United States) Graham Rahal	Rahal Letterman Lanigan Racing	Honda	0	Contact	0	10		5
Fastest lap: (Spain) Álex Palou (Chip Ganassi Racing) – 01:08.4168 (lap 52)

== Championship standings after the race ==
Drivers' Championship standings

	Pos.	Driver	Points
Unchanged	1	(Spain) Álex Palou	656
Unchanged	2	(New Zealand) Scott Dixon	578
2	3	(New Zealand) Scott McLaughlin	488
Unchanged	4	(Mexico) Pato O'Ward	484
2	5	(United States) Josef Newgarden	479

Engine manufacturer standings

	Pos.	Manufacturer	Points
1	1	Chevrolet	1437
1	2	Honda	1425

- Note: Only the top five positions are included.

== Footnotes ==
Previous race: 2023 BitNile.com Grand Prix of Portland	IndyCar Series; 2023 season	Next race: 2024 Firestone Grand Prix of St. Petersburg
Previous race: 2022 Firestone Grand Prix of Monterey	Firestone Grand Prix of Monterey	Next race: 2024 Firestone Grand Prix of Monterey
