= Falcon Motorsports =

American manufacturer of high performance automobiles

- Industry: Automotive
- Founded: 2009
- Founder: Jeff Lemke
- Headquarters: Holly, Michigan, U.S.
- Website: https://falconf7.com/

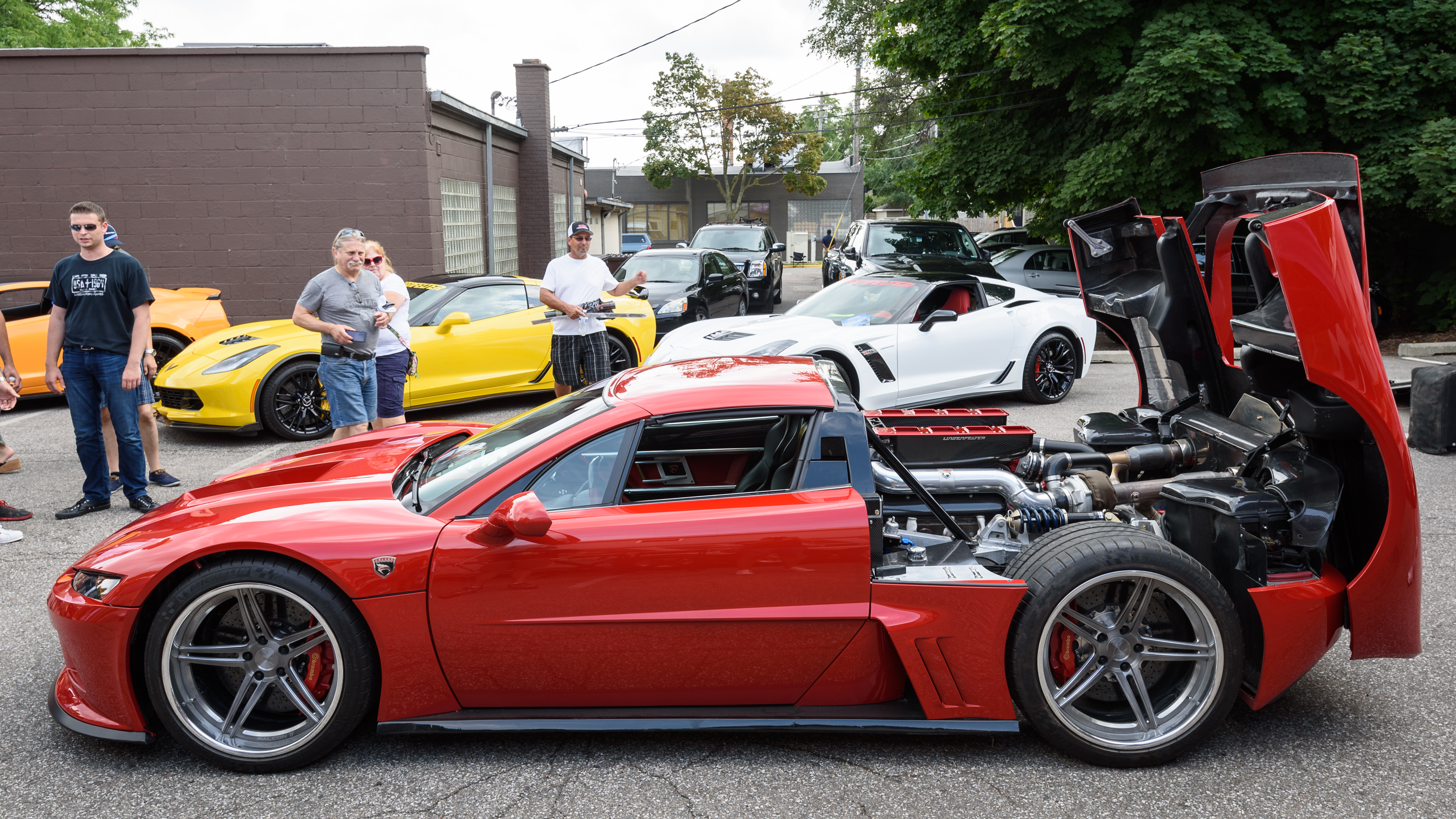
2013 Falcon F7

Falcon Motorsports is an American manufacturer of high performance automobiles, most notably the Falcon F series Falcon F5 and Falcon F7. The Michigan-based company was founded in 2009 by American automotive designer and engineer Jeff Lemke.

A prototype was first shown to the public at the 2010 North American International Auto Show.

In 2012, Falcon presented the production version of the Falcon F7 to the international automotive press. This was the company's inaugural vehicle. The F7 is a mid engine rear-wheel-drive two seat sports car with a monocoque chassis built from aluminum, carbon fiber and Kevlar. In its base configuration the car is powered by a naturally aspirated 427 cubic inch all aluminum dry-sump V8 (LS7-derived), delivering between 620 and 680 hp which enables the 2,750 lb. car to accelerate from a standstill to 60 mph in 3.3 - 3.6 seconds.

The company later introduced an evolution model of the Falcon F7 that utilizes forced induction, i.e. a twin turbo system on its 427 cubic inch V8, bringing the output of the car to 1,100 hp to the wheels. This version will accelerate from 0–60 in 2.7 seconds. The powertrain was developed in co-operation with Lingenfelter Performance Engineering.

The Falcon F7 supercar received critical attention from automotive enthusiasts, test drivers and journalists, but the company was only able to build seven examples, one of which was profiled in episode 19 of the second season of Discovery's TV show How it's Made: Dream Cars.
