= Patrick Lemarié =

French racing driver (born 1968)

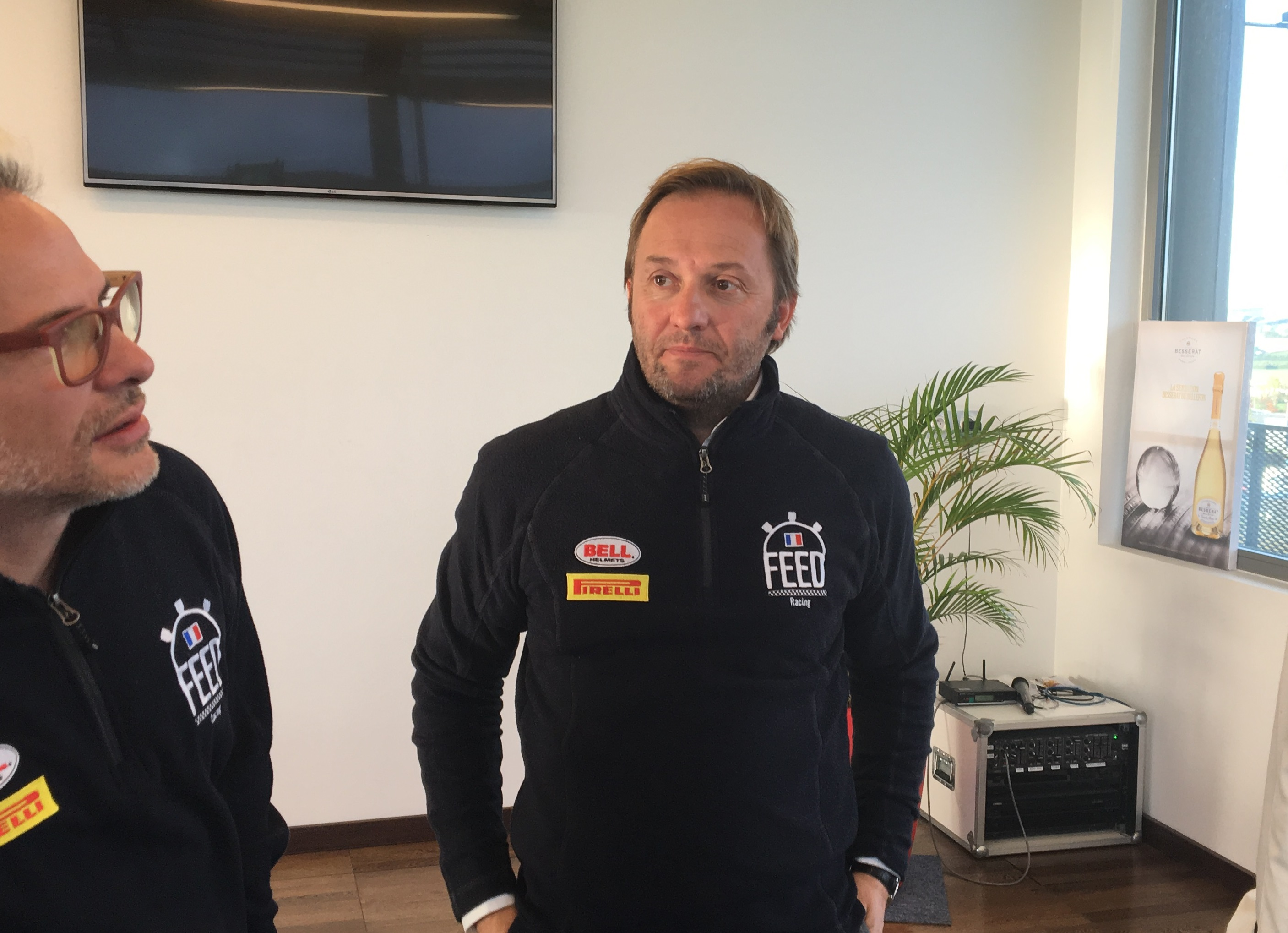
- Nationality: (France) French
- Born: Patrick Lemarié; February 6, 1968 (age 58); Paris, Île-de-France

Champ Car career
- 6 races run over 1 year
- Years active: 2003
- Team: PK Racing
- Best finish: 21st (2003)
- First race: 2003 Grand Prix of St. Petersburg (St. Petersburg)
- Last race: 2003 Milwaukee Mile Centennial 250 (Milwaukee)
Wins	Podiums	Poles
0	0	0

NASCAR Whelen Euro Series career
- Debut season: 2020
- Current team: Academy Motorsport
- Car number: 1
- Former teams: FEED Vict Racing, DF1 Racing
- Starts: 29
- Championships: 0
- Wins: 1
- Poles: 0
- Fastest laps: 0
- Best finish: 7th in 2022

Previous series
- 2003 2001 2001 1996-97 1993-94 1988, 1990, 1992 1989-91: CART; European Le Mans Series; American Le Mans Series; International Formula 3000; Formula Atlantic; Formula 3 France; Formula Ford 1600 France

24 Hours of Le Mans career
- Years: 2000–2001
- Teams: Debora, Audi
- Best finish: DNF (2000, 2001)
- Class wins: 0

Patrick Lemarié is a French auto racing driver born February 6, 1968, in Paris. He currently competes in the NASCAR Whelen Euro Series, driving the No. 5 car for Academy Motorsport in the EuroNASCAR PRO class having previously competed for FEED Vict Racing and DF1 Racing. The son of Jean Pierre Lemarié (1941–2016), he spent four years performing testing work for the British American Racing Formula One team but was never considered for a race seat due to his lack of experience. Lemarié's manager, Craig Pollock, hired him to drive for the new PK Racing Champ Car team in 2003. He scored two tenth-place finishes in the first two events but was replaced after six races for Mazda Raceway Laguna Seca expert Bryan Herta. Lemarié has also competed in the 24 Hours of Le Mans, American Le Mans series, Indy Lights, Toyota Atlantic and Formula 3000.

In 2022, Lemarié became the oldest winner in NASCAR Whelen Euro Series by winning the final round of the season at 54 years old.

== Racing record ==
=== Complete International Formula 3000 results ===
(key) (Races in bold indicate pole position) (Races in italics indicate fastest lap)

Year	Entrant	1	2	3	4	5	6	7	8	9	10	DC	Points
1996	Pacific Racing	NÜR; 12	PAU; 5	PER; 13	HOC; 10	SIL; 8	SPA; Ret	MAG; 8	EST; 15	MUG; Ret	HOC; 8	15th	2
1997	Ravarotto Racing	SIL; 6	PAU; 13	HEL; 4	NÜR; 13	PER	HOC; Ret	A1R	SPA			16th	4
1997	D.C. Cook Motorsport									MUG; 14	JER; DNQ	16th	4

=== Le Mans 24 Hours results ===
Year	Team	Co-Drivers	Car	Class	Laps	Pos.	Class Pos.
2000	(France) Didier Bonnet Racing	(France) Jean-François Yvon (France) Yann Goudy	Debora LMP2000-BMW	LMP675	24	DNF	DNF
2001	(United Kingdom) Johansson Motorsport	(Sweden) Stefan Johansson (Netherlands) Tom Coronel	Audi R8	LMP900	35	DNF	DNF

=== Complete American Le Mans Series results ===
Year	Entrant	Class	Chassis	Engine	1	2	3	4	5	6	7	8	9	10	Rank	Points
2001	Johansson Motorsport Arena Motorsport	LMP900	Audi R8	Audi 3.6L Turbo V8	TEX	SEB	DON	JAR	SON	POR	MOS	MID	MON; 3	PET; 2	18th	46

=== Complete CART results ===
(key)

Year	Team	No.	Chassis	Engine	1	2	3	4	5	6	7	8	9	10	11	12	13	14	15	16	17	18	19	Rank	Points	Ref
2003	PK Racing	27	Lola B02/00	Ford XFE V8t	STP; 10	MTY; 10	LBH; 13	BRH; 11	LAU; 19	MIL; 18	LS	POR	CLE	TOR	VAN	ROA	MDO	MTL	DEN	MIA	MXC	SRF	FON	21st	8	

=== Complete NASCAR results ===
==== Whelen Euro Series - EuroNASCAR PRO ====
(key) Bold - Pole position awarded by fastest qualifying time (in Race 1) or by previous race's fastest lap (in Race 2). Italics - Fastest lap. * – Most laps led. ^ – Most positions gained.)

NASCAR Whelen Euro Series - EuroNASCAR PRO results
Year	Team	No.	Make	1	2	3	4	5	6	7	8	9	10	11	12	13	NWES	Pts
2020	FEED Vict Racing	6	EuroNASCAR FJ	ITA; 11	ITA; 10	BEL; 20	BEL; 16	CRO	CRO	ESP; 17	ESP; 16	ESP; 13	ESP; 9				17th	242
2021	DF1 Racing	66	Chevy	ESP; 23	ESP; DNS	GBR	GBR	CZE; 20	CZE; 19	CRO; 11	CRO; 21			ITA; 8	ITA; DNS		18th	223
2021	Academy Motorsport	5	EuroNASCAR FJ									BEL; 6	BEL; 18				18th	223
2022	Academy Motorsport	5	EuroNASCAR FJ	ESP; 17	ESP; 23	GBR; 9	GBR; 8	ITA; 6	ITA; DNS	CZE; 27	CZE; 7^	BEL; 9	BEL; 24	CRO; 3	CRO; 1		7th	345
2024	Academy Motorsport	1	Ford	ESP; 8	ESP; 21	ITA	ITA	GBR	GBR	NED	CZE	CZE	GER	GER	BEL	BEL	29th	44
