= Geoff Boss =

American racing driver

- Nationality: United States of America
- Born: 26 April 1969 (age 57) Narragansett, Rhode Island, U.S.

Champ Car career
- 12 races run over 1 year
- Team: Dale Coyne Racing
- Best finish: 20th (2003)
- First race: 2003 Grand Prix of Monterey (Laguna Seca)
- Last race: 2003 Lexmark Indy 300 (Surfers Paradise)

Geoff Boss (born April 26, 1969) is an American racing driver best known for his appearance in the 2003 CART season for Dale Coyne Racing. Boss also competed across five years in Indy Lights where he won the Toronto Grand Prix from pole position and had four additional podiums in Long Beach and Detroit. He most recently competed in the 2018 Porsche GT3 Challenge for JDX Racing.

== Racing history ==
Boss competed in the Formula Ford Festival at Brands Hatch in 1992 with Team USA Scholarship. He won the Skip Barber Formula Ford Series three times, twice in 1992 (East and Midwest) and again in 1993 (South), becoming the first driver to win three Championships. He also competed in the 12 Hours of Sebring in 1994 in a Nissan for Leitzinger Racing with his brother Andy. He competed in the Barber Dodge Pro Series from 1993 to 1996, winning races at Miami, Sears Point, Phoenix, Watkins Glen, and Reno. He was runner-up in the 1995 Championship to Jaki Scheckter. He ran in the Indy Lights series from 1997 to 2001, winning the 1999 Toronto Grand Prix from the Pole position. He also had podium finishes at Long Beach (twice) and Detroit (twice). Boss joined Dale Coyne Racing after a third of the season to replace Joel Camathias in the 11 car during the 2003 CART season. In a total of 12 starts, he finished in the points three times, with a best of ninth place at the Lexmark Indy 300 in Australia. Boss competed in the 2018 Porsche GT3 Challenge for JDX Racing achieving a best finish of 6th on three occasions, at Sebring, Mid-Ohio and Watkins Glen.

== Racing record ==
=== Complete American open-wheel racing results ===
(key)

==== Indy Lights ====
Year	Team	1	2	3	4	5	6	7	8	9	10	11	12	13	14	Rank	Points
1997	Team Medlin	MIA; 10	LBH; 24	NAZ; 17	SAV; 20	STL; 21	MIL; 20	DET; 3	POR; 10	TOR; 14	TRO; 11	VAN; 9	LS; 9	FON		17th	30
1998	Lucas Place Motorsports	MIA; 9	LBH; 2	NAZ; 12	STL; 15	MIL; 4	DET; 3	POR; 11	CLE; 20	TOR; 19	MIS; 14	TRO; 19	VAN; 7	LS; 4	FON; 18	9th	67
1999	Lucas Motorsports	MIA; 8	LBH; 3	NAZ; 13	MIL; 14	POR; 12	CLE; 13	TOR; 1	MIS; 9	DET; 6	CHI; 11	LS; 14	FON; 11			12th	58
2000	Lucas Motorsports	LBH; 8	MIL; 11	DET; 11	POR; 9	MIS; 6	CHI; 12	MOH; 8	VAN; 11	LS; 12	STL; 12	HOU; 4	FON; DNS			12th	43
2001	Dorricott Racing	MTY	LBH	TXS	MIL	POR	KAN	TOR; 6	MOH; 10	STL	ATL	LS	FON			13th	11

==== CART World Series ====
Year	Team	No.	Chassis	Engine	1	2	3	4	5	6	7	8	9	10	11	12	13	14	15	16	17	18	19	Rank	Points	Ref
2003	Dale Coyne Racing	11	Lola B02/00	Ford XFE V8t	STP	MTY	LBH	BRH	LAU	MIL	LS; 16	POR; 13	CLE; 16	TOR; 14	VAN; DNS	ROA; 13	MOH; 14	MTL; 14	DEN; 12	MIA; 10	MXC; 20	SRF; 9	FON; NH	20th	8	
