= 2003 Champ Car World Series =

American motorsport season

2003 CART season
- Bridgestone Presents the Champ Car World Series Powered by Ford

Season
- Races: ~~19~~ 18
- Start date: February 23
- End date: October 26

Awards
- Drivers' champion: (Canada) Paul Tracy
- Constructors' Cup: (United Kingdom) Lola
- Nations' Cup: Canada
- Rookie of the Year: (France) Sébastien Bourdais

The 2003 Champ Car World Series, the twenty-fifth and final in the Championship Auto Racing Teams (CART) era of American open-wheel car racing, consisted of 18 races, beginning in St. Petersburg, Florida, United States on February 23 and concluding in Surfers Paradise, Queensland, Australia on October 26. For sponsorship purposes, it was branded as Bridgestone Presents the Champ Car World Series Powered by Ford.

The intended final event, scheduled to be held in Fontana, California, on November 9 was canceled due to wildfires, one of which was known as the "Grand Prix Fire", burning in and around San Bernardino County.

The Drivers' Champion was Paul Tracy. Rookie of the Year was Sébastien Bourdais. At the end of the season, the operations of a now bankrupt CART were assumed by Open Wheel Racing Series LLC, which continued to brand its top series as the Champ Car World Series. Cosworth (backed by Ford) became the series' sole engine supplier for this season following defection of Honda and Toyota to the rival IRL series for 2003.

The season was the first since 1993 not to feature Michael Andretti.

== Drivers and teams ==
With the departure of Honda and Toyota to the Indy Racing League (IRL) for the 2003 season, Cosworth became the exclusive engine supplier for the CART series. Their turbocharged 2.65L XFE V8 engine continued to be badged by Ford. Bridgestone continued on as the exclusive tire supplier for the series. Starting in 2003, CART began branding itself as the Champ Car World Series, and a marketing agreement between CART and the two suppliers resulted in the full branding of "Bridgestone Presents the Champ Car World Series Powered by Ford."

Unlike previous years, due to the declining fortunes of CART, teams did not build or buy new chassis. The Lola B02/00 and Reynard 02I continued to be used until 2006

The following teams and drivers competed in the 2003 Champ Car World Series season.

Team	Chassis	No	Drivers	Races	Primary Sponsors
(United States) Newman/Haas Racing	Lola B02/00	1	(Brazil) Bruno Junqueira	All	PacifiCare
(United States) Newman/Haas Racing	Lola B02/00	2	(France) Sébastien Bourdais R	All	Eli Lilly 13; McDonald's 3 Cialis 1 ConnectED 1
(United States) Team Player's	Lola B02/00	3	(Canada) Paul Tracy	All	Player's 16; It's Your World 2 LastLap.ca16-18
(United States) Team Player's	Lola B02/00	32	(Canada) Patrick Carpentier	All	Player's 16; It's Your World 2 LastLap.ca16-18
(Mexico) Herdez Competition	Lola B02/00	4	(Brazil) Roberto Moreno	1–16, 18	Herdez
(Mexico) Herdez Competition	Lola B02/00	4	(Mexico) Roberto González R	17	Herdez
(Mexico) Herdez Competition	Lola B02/00	55	(Mexico) Mario Domínguez	All	Herdez
(United States) Walker Racing	Reynard 02I	5	(Mexico) Rodolfo Lavín R	All	Corona
(United States) Walker Racing	Reynard 02I	15	(United Kingdom) Darren Manning R	All	RAC AutoWindscreens 6 U.S. Air Force 1 Air China 6 Sportsbook.com 5
(United States) Walker Racing	Reynard 02I	25	(Mexico) Luis Díaz R	17	Sun Microsystems
(United States) Fittipaldi-Dingman Racing	Reynard 02I	7	(Portugal) Tiago Monteiro R	All	Laureus 2 World Childhood Foundation 8 O2 Diesel 7 AllSlots.com 1
(United States) Team Rahal	Lola B02/00	9	(Mexico) Michel Jourdain Jr.	All	Gigante 17; Office Depot 1
(United States) Dale Coyne Racing	Lola B02/00	11	(Mexico) Roberto González R	1	Lotto Speed 2 Snap-On Tools 1 Malaysia Airlines 2
(United States) Dale Coyne Racing	Lola B02/00	11	(Malaysia) Alex Yoong R	2–5	Lotto Speed 2 Snap-On Tools 1 Malaysia Airlines 2
(United States) Dale Coyne Racing	Lola B02/00	11	(Brazil) Gualter Salles	6	Alpina
(United States) Dale Coyne Racing	Lola B02/00	11	(United States) Geoff Boss R	7–18	Lacoste
(United States) Dale Coyne Racing	Lola B02/00	19	(Switzerland) Joël Camathias R	1–7	City of Lugano
(United States) Dale Coyne Racing	Lola B02/00	19	(Brazil) Gualter Salles	8–9, 11–15, 17–18	Alpina
(United States) Dale Coyne Racing	Lola B02/00	19	(Brazil) Alex Sperafico R	10, 16	Dale Coyne Racing
(United States) American Spirit Team Johansson	Reynard 02I	12	(United States) Jimmy Vasser	All	American Spirit Team Johansson 17; Gonher de Mexico 1
(United States) American Spirit Team Johansson	Reynard 02I	31	(United States) Ryan Hunter-Reay R	All	American Spirit Team Johansson 17; Gonher de Mexico 1
(United States) Patrick Racing	Lola B02/00	20	(Spain) Oriol Servià	All	Visteon
(United States) PK Racing	Lola B02/00	27	(France) Patrick Lemarié R	1–6	Scientific Atlanta 17; Yalumba 1
(United States) PK Racing	Lola B02/00	27	(United States) Bryan Herta	7	Scientific Atlanta 17; Yalumba 1
(United States) PK Racing	Lola B02/00	27	(Italy) Max Papis	8-14	Scientific Atlanta 17; Yalumba 1
(United States) PK Racing	Lola B02/00	27	(Finland) Mika Salo R	15–18	Scientific Atlanta 17; Yalumba 1
(United States) Rocketsports Racing	Lola B02/00	33	(Canada) Alex Tagliani	All	Johnson Controls
(United States) Mi-Jack Conquest Racing	Reynard 02I	34	(Brazil) Mário Haberfeld R	All	Mi-Jack
(Mexico) Fernández Racing	Lola B02/00	51	(Mexico) Adrián Fernández	All	Tecate

R Eligible for Rookie of the Year

=== Team changes ===
With the departure of Honda and Toyota to the IRL for the 2003 season, four CART teams joined them in the rival series as well. Chip Ganassi Racing, Andretti Green Racing (a merger of the former Team Green and Michael Andretti's Team Motorola) and Mo Nunn Racing became full-time IRL competitors for the 2003 season. Meanwhile, Mi-Jack Conquest Racing went against flow and jumped from the IRL to CART. Team Rahal and Fernández Racing split their efforts between the two series, each reducing their Champ Car teams to a single car. Dale Coyne Racing returned to full-time status after a partial season effort in 2002.

Four new teams joined the series. Businessman Kevin Kalkhoven and Craig Pollock, who previously managed the British American Racing team in Formula One, started the PK Racing team. Long-time Trans-Am competitor Paul Gentilozzi expanded his Rocketsports Racing team to include a Champ Car effort. Kalkhoven and Gentilozzi would go on to become two of the owners of the series in 2004 after the CART organization went bankrupt. Formula One and Champ Car champion Emerson Fittipaldi and businessman Jamie Dingman formed Fittipaldi-Dingman Racing while Formula One and Champ Car veteran Stefan Johansson formed American Spirit Team Johansson.

=== Driver changes ===
Along with the major changes to the team lineup to the series, a great many new faces made their debut in 2003. Of the nineteen drivers at the season opener in St. Petersburg, nine were rookies. Most notable was 2002 Formula 3000 champion Sébastien Bourdais who joined Newman/Haas Racing. Bourdais would impress immediately by taking pole in his first race, winning his fourth race, and finishing fourth in the season championship. Walker Racing had a lineup of two rookies, Rodolfo Lavín and Darren Manning, who actually debuted at the 2002 race at the Rockingham Motor Speedway in Corby, England but was still considered a series rookie. Three rookie teams campaigned with rookie drivers. Fittipaldi-Dingman Racing ran Tiago Monteiro, Mi-Jack Conquest Racing chose Mário Haberfeld, while PK Racing began the year with Patrick Lemarié.

Familiar Champ Car drivers also found themselves in new surroundings for 2003. With Chip Ganassi Racing gone to the IRL, Bruno Junqueira took over the #1 car at Newman-Haas, replacing Cristiano da Matta who moved on to Formula One after winning the 2002 CART championship. With Team Green also gone to the IRL, Paul Tracy moved over to Team Player's. Tracy would reward his new team with the season championship. Alex Tagliani lost his Player's seat to Tracy but found a ride with the new Rocketsports Racing team. Champ Car's elder statesman Jimmy Vasser joined the new American Spirit Team Johansson team after Team Rahal downsized to a single car. His teammate there was series rookie Ryan Hunter-Reay. Herdez Competition tabbed veteran Roberto Moreno for their expanded two car team.

The list of drivers not changing teams was short. Patrick Carpentier at Player's, Mario Domínguez at Herdez, Michel Jourdain Jr. at Team Rahal, Oriol Servia at Patrick Racing, and Adrian Fernández continued to drive his own car.

=== Mid-season changes ===
- Alex Yoong, a former Formula One pay driver, took over the Dale Coyne Racing #11 car from Roberto González starting with the 2nd race of the season in Monterrey.
- Sponsorship problems caused Yoong to lose his race seat to Champ Car veteran Gualter Salles at Milwaukee. This marked Salles's first Champ Car start since Road America in August 2000.
- After a series of disappointing results to open the season, PK Racing replaced Patrick Lemarié with noted Laguna Seca expert Bryan Herta for the race there. Herta's full-time job in 2003 was driving in the IRL for Andretti Green Racing so Max Papis took over the car starting with the following round at Portland.
- Also at Laguna, the revolving door at Coyne continued with Geoff Boss taking over the #11 from Salles.
- The shuffle at Coyne did not stop at Portland as Gualter Salles returned, taking over the #19 car from Joël Camathias. Salles remained in the #19 for the rest of the year with two exceptions: Alex Sperafico took over the car at Toronto and Miami because Salles had previous commitments those weekends.
- PK Racing brought in Formula One veteran Mika Salo for the final four races of the year starting with the race in Denver.
- Two extra Mexican drivers were brought in for the race in Mexico City. Herdez Competition gave away Roberto Moreno's car to Roberto González for the race, while Walker Racing ran a third car for Luis Díaz.

== Schedule ==
Icon	Legend
O	Oval/Speedway
R	Road course
S	Street circuit
C	Cancelled race

Rnd	Date	Race Name	Circuit	City/Location
1	February 23	(United States) Grand Prix of St. Petersburg	S St. Petersburg Street Circuit	St. Petersburg, Florida
2	March 23	(Mexico) Tecate/Telmex Grand Prix	R Fundidora Park	Monterrey, Mexico
3	April 13	(United States) Toyota Grand Prix of Long Beach	S Streets of Long Beach	Long Beach, California
4	May 5	(United Kingdom) London Champ Car Trophy	R Brands Hatch	Longfield, United Kingdom
5	May 11	(Germany) German 500	O EuroSpeedway Lausitz	Klettwitz, Germany
6	May 31	(United States) Milwaukee Mile Centennial 250	O Milwaukee Mile	West Allis, Wisconsin
7	June 15	(United States) Grand Prix of Monterey	R Mazda Raceway Laguna Seca	Monterey, California
8	June 22	(United States) G.I. Joe's 200	R Portland International Raceway	Portland, Oregon
9	July 5	(United States) Cleveland Grand Prix	R Cleveland Burke Lakefront Airport	Cleveland, Ohio
10	July 13	(Canada) Molson Indy Toronto	S Exhibition Place	Toronto, Ontario
11	July 27	(Canada) Molson Indy Vancouver	S Concord Pacific Place	Vancouver, British Columbia
12	August 3	(United States) Mario Andretti Grand Prix at Road America	R Road America	Elkhart Lake, Wisconsin
13	August 10	(United States) Champ Car Grand Prix of Mid-Ohio	R Mid-Ohio Sports Car Course	Lexington, Ohio
14	August 24	(Canada) Molson Indy Montreal	R Circuit Gilles Villeneuve	Montreal, Quebec
15	August 31	(United States) Centrix Financial Grand Prix of Denver	S Denver Civic Center	Denver, Colorado
16	September 28	(United States) Grand Prix Americas	S Miami Bayfront Park Street Circuit	Miami, Florida
17	October 12	(Mexico) Gran Premio Telmex-Gigante	R Autódromo Hermanos Rodríguez	Mexico City, Mexico
18	October 26	(Australia) Lexmark Indy 300	S Surfers Paradise Street Circuit	Surfers Paradise, Australia
C	November 9	(United States) King Taco 500	O California Speedway	Fontana, California

== Results ==
Rnd	Race Name	Pole position	Fastest lap	Lead most laps	Winning driver	Winning team	Report
1	(United States) St. Petersburg	(France) Sébastien Bourdais	(France) Sébastien Bourdais	(Canada) Paul Tracy	(Canada) Paul Tracy	Team Player's	Report
2	(Mexico) Monterrey	(France) Sébastien Bourdais	(Brazil) Bruno Junqueira	(Canada) Paul Tracy	(Canada) Paul Tracy	Team Player's	Report
3	(United States) Long Beach	(Mexico) Michel Jourdain Jr.	(Mexico) Michel Jourdain Jr.	(Mexico) Michel Jourdain Jr.	(Canada) Paul Tracy	Team Player's	Report
4	(United Kingdom) Brands Hatch	(Canada) Paul Tracy	(Mexico) Adrián Fernández	(France) Sébastien Bourdais	(France) Sébastien Bourdais	Newman/Haas Racing	Report
5	(Germany) EuroSpeedway	(France) Sébastien Bourdais	(Mexico) Michel Jourdain Jr.	(France) Sébastien Bourdais	(France) Sébastien Bourdais	Newman/Haas Racing	Report
6	(United States) Milwaukee	(Canada) Alex Tagliani	(Canada) Patrick Carpentier	(Mexico) Michel Jourdain Jr.	(Mexico) Michel Jourdain Jr.	Team Rahal	Report
7	(United States) Laguna Seca	(Canada) Patrick Carpentier	(Canada) Patrick Carpentier	(Canada) Patrick Carpentier	(Canada) Patrick Carpentier	Team Player's	Report
8	(United States) Portland	(Canada) Paul Tracy	(Canada) Alex Tagliani	(Canada) Paul Tracy (Mexico) Michel Jourdain Jr.	(Mexico) Adrián Fernández	Fernández Racing	Report
9	(United States) Cleveland	(France) Sébastien Bourdais	(France) Sébastien Bourdais	(Canada) Paul Tracy	(France) Sébastien Bourdais	Newman/Haas Racing	Report
10	(Canada) Toronto	(Canada) Paul Tracy	(Canada) Paul Tracy	(Canada) Paul Tracy	(Canada) Paul Tracy	Team Player's	Report
11	(Canada) Vancouver	(Canada) Paul Tracy	(France) Sébastien Bourdais	(Canada) Paul Tracy	(Canada) Paul Tracy	Team Player's	Report
12	(United States) Road America	(Brazil) Bruno Junqueira	(France) Sébastien Bourdais	(Brazil) Bruno Junqueira	(Brazil) Bruno Junqueira	Newman/Haas Racing	Report
13	(United States) Mid-Ohio	(Canada) Paul Tracy	(United States) Jimmy Vasser	(Canada) Paul Tracy	(Canada) Paul Tracy	Team Player's	Report
14	(Canada) Montreal	(Canada) Alex Tagliani	(Brazil) Bruno Junqueira	(Canada) Alex Tagliani	(Mexico) Michel Jourdain Jr.	Team Rahal	Report
15	(United States) Denver	(Brazil) Bruno Junqueira	(Brazil) Mário Haberfeld	(Brazil) Bruno Junqueira	(Brazil) Bruno Junqueira	Newman/Haas Racing	Report
16	(United States) Miami	(Mexico) Adrián Fernández	(Mexico) Adrián Fernández	(Mexico) Adrián Fernández	(Mexico) Mario Domínguez	Herdez Competition	Report
17	Mexico City	(Canada) Paul Tracy	(United States) Ryan Hunter-Reay	(Canada) Paul Tracy	(Canada) Paul Tracy	Team Player's	Report
18	(Australia) Surfers Paradise	(France) Sébastien Bourdais	(Brazil) Roberto Moreno	(Brazil) Bruno Junqueira	(United States) Ryan Hunter-Reay	American Spirit Team Johansson	Report
19	(United States) Fontana	Race cancelled due to wildfires					Report

=== Final driver standings ===
Pos	Driver	STP (United States)	FUN (Mexico)	LBH (United States)	BRH (United Kingdom)	LAU (Germany)	MIL (United States)	LAG (United States)	POR (United States)	CLE (United States)	TOR (Canada)	VAN (Canada)	ROA (United States)	MOH (United States)	CGV (Canada)	DEN (United States)	BAY (United States)	MXC (Mexico)	SUR (Australia)	Pts
1	(Canada) Paul Tracy	1*	1*	1	**17**	12	12	3	**2***	2*	**1***	**1***	15	**1***	6	4	16	**1***	13	226
2	(Brazil) Bruno Junqueira	3	5	3	2	4	17	2	4	3	3	2	**1***	13	13	**1***	9	7	15*	199
3	(Mexico) Michel Jourdain Jr.	2	2	**15***	6	3	1*	4	12	7	2	4	16	4	1	6	7	4	4	195
4	(France) Sébastien Bourdais RY	**11**	**17**	16	1*	**1***	9	17	14	**1**	4	3	2	5	19	2	17	2	**17**	159
5	(Canada) Patrick Carpentier	8	8	6	5	7	3	**1***	16	4	7	13	5	2	3	17	6	14	5	146
6	(Mexico) Mario Domínguez	14	13	5	3	2	8	10	10	5	12	10	14	16	5	7	1	3	10	118
7	(Spain) Oriol Servià	12	18	12	4	5	2	6	5	6	5	16	18	18	2	3	19	13	19	108
8	(Mexico) Adrián Fernández	15	4	2	12	15	6	7	1	11	9	12	12	7	8	5	**8***	8	12	105
9	(United Kingdom) Darren Manning R	13	7	8	10	6	4	18	6	10	8	5	6	8	10	8	11	9	2	103
10	(Canada) Alex Tagliani	19	3	10	8	18	**5**	14	3	8	17	14	3	6	**4***	9	13	16	7	97
11	(United States) Jimmy Vasser	6	14	4	19	8	11	8	7	13	13	11	9	15	16	11	4	17	3	72
12	(Brazil) Mário Haberfeld R	4	16	9	9	14	7	5	8	15	19	7	8	10	11	10	5	12	14	71
13	(Brazil) Roberto Moreno	5	6	17	7	10	19	15	9	18	6	17	7	19	7	16	2		16	67
14	(United States) Ryan Hunter-Reay R	16	12	7	16	11	16	12	17	9	11	6	10	3	17	15	12	11	1	64
15	(Portugal) Tiago Monteiro R	7	19	11	14	13	10	9	19	Wth	10	15	17	11	18	13	15	6	18	29
16	(Finland) Mika Salo R															14	3	5	11	26
17	(Italy) Max Papis								15	12	16	9	4	9	9					25
18	(Mexico) Rodolfo Lavín R	18	15	18	15	9	14	19	11	14	15	8	19	12	15	19	18	18	8	17
19	(Brazil) Gualter Salles						13		18	17		18	11	17	12	18		15	6	11
20	(United States) Geoff Boss R							16	13	16	14	19	13	14	14	12	10	20	9	8
21	(France) Patrick Lemarié R	10	10	13	11	19	18													8
22	(Switzerland) Joël Camathias R	9	11	14	13	16	15	13												6
23	(Malaysia) Alex Yoong R		9	19	18	17														4
24	(Mexico) Roberto González R	17																10		3
25	(United States) Bryan Herta							11												2
26	(Brazil) Alex Sperafico R										18						14			0
27	(Mexico) Luis Díaz R																	19		0
Pos	Driver	STP (United States)	FUN (Mexico)	LBH (United States)	BRH (United Kingdom)	LAU (Germany)	MIL (United States)	LAG (United States)	POR (United States)	CLE (United States)	TOR (Canada)	VAN (Canada)	ROA (United States)	MOH (United States)	CGV (Canada)	DEN (United States)	BAY (United States)	MXC (Mexico)	SUR (Australia)	Pts

Color	Result
Gold	Winner
Silver	2nd place
Bronze	3rd place
Green	4th-6th place
Light Blue	7th-12th place
Dark Blue	Finished (Outside Top 12)
Purple	Did not finish
Red	Did not qualify (DNQ)
Brown	Withdrawn (Wth)
Black	Disqualified (DSQ)
White	Did not start (DNS)
Blank	Did not participate (DNP)
Blank	Not competing

**In-line notation**
**Bold**	Pole position
Italics	Ran fastest race lap
*	Led most race laps
RY	Rookie of the Year
R	Rookie

=== Nations' Cup ===
- Top result per race counts towards Nations' Cup.

Pos	Country	STP (United States)	FUN (Mexico)	LBH (United States)	BRH (United Kingdom)	LAU (Germany)	MIL (United States)	LAG (United States)	POR (United States)	CLE (United States)	TOR (Canada)	VAN (Canada)	ROA (United States)	MOH (United States)	CGV (Canada)	DEN (United States)	BAY (United States)	MXC (Mexico)	SUR (Australia)	Pts
1	Canada	1	1	1	5	7	3	1	2	2	1	1	3	1	3	4	6	1	5	298
2	Mexico	2	2	2	3	2	1	4	1	5	2	4	12	4	1	5	1	3	4	262
3	Brazil	3	5	3	2	4	7	2	4	3	3	2	1	10	7	1	2	7	6	228
4	France	10	10	13	1	1	9	17	14	1	4	3	2	5	19	2	17	2	17	161
5	United States	6	12	4	16	8	11	8	7	9	11	6	9	3	14	11	4	11	1	107
6	Spain	12	18	12	4	5	2	6	5	6	5	16	18	18	2	3	19	13	19	106
7	England	13	7	8	10	6	4	18	6	10	8	5	6	8	10	8	11	9	2	103
8	Portugal	7	19	11	14	13	10	9	19	Wth	10	15	17	11	18	13	15	6	18	28
9	Finland															14	3	5	11	26
10	Italy								15	12	16	9	4	9	9					25
11	Switzerland	9	11	14	13	16	15	13												6
12	Malaysia		9	19	18	17														4
Pos	Country	STP (United States)	FUN (Mexico)	LBH (United States)	BRH (United Kingdom)	LAU (Germany)	MIL (United States)	LAG (United States)	POR (United States)	CLE (United States)	TOR (Canada)	VAN (Canada)	ROA (United States)	MOH (United States)	CGV (Canada)	DEN (United States)	BAY (United States)	MXC (Mexico)	SUR (Australia)	Pts

=== Chassis Constructors' Cup ===
Pos	Chassis	Pts
1	(United Kingdom) Lola	387
2	(United Kingdom) Reynard	161
Pos	Chassis	Pts

=== Driver breakdown ===
Pos	Driver	Team	Entries	Wins	Podiums	Top 5s	Top 10s	Poles	Laps Lead	Points
1	(Canada) Tracy	(United States) Team Player's	18	7	10	11	12	6	658	226
2	(Brazil) Junqueira	(United States) Newman-Haas Racing	18	2	9	12	14	2	184	199
3	(Mexico) Jourdain Jr.	(United States) Team Rahal	18	2	6	11	15	1	350	195
4	(France) Bourdais R	(United States) Newman-Haas Racing	18	3	7	9	10	5	254	159
5	(Canada) Carpentier	(United States) Team Player's	18	1	4	8	14	1	107	146
6	(Mexico) Domínguez	(Mexico) Herdez Competition	18	1	4	7	13	--	76	118
7	(Spain) Servià	(United States) Patrick Racing	18	--	3	7	9	--	37	108
8	(Mexico) Fernández	(Mexico) Fernández Racing	18	1	2	4	11	1	123	105
9	(United Kingdom) Manning R	(United States) Walker Racing	18	--	1	3	15	--	4	103
10	(Canada) Tagliani	(United States) Rocketsports Racing	18	--	3	5	11	1*	70	97
11	(United States) Vasser	(United States) American Spirit Team Johansson	18	--	1	3	8	--	18	72
12	(Brazil) Haberfeld R	(United States) Mi-Jack Conquest Racing	18	--	--	3	11	--	--	71
13	(Brazil) Moreno	(Mexico) Herdez Competition	17	--	1	2	9	--	6	67
14	(United States) Hunter-Reay R	(United States) American Spirit Team Johansson	18	1	2	2	6	--	15	64
15	(Portugal) Monteiro R	(United States) Fittipaldi-Dingman Racing	18	--	--	--	5	--	14	29
16	(Finland) Salo R	(United States) PK Racing	4	--	1	2	2	--	6	26
17	(Italy) Papis	(United States) PK Racing	7	--	--	1	4	--	--	25
18	(Mexico) Lavín R	(United States) Walker Racing	18	--	--	--	3	--	--	17
19	(Brazil) Salles	(United States) Dale Coyne Racing	9	--	--	--	1	--	--	11
20	(United States) Boss R	(United States) Dale Coyne Racing	11	--	--	--	2	--	--	8
21	(France) Lemarié R	(United States) PK Racing	6	--	--	--	2	--	--	8
22	(Switzerland) Camathias R	(United States) Dale Coyne Racing	7	--	--	--	1	--	--	6
23	(Malaysia) Yoong R	(United States) Dale Coyne Racing	4	--	--	--	1	--	--	4
24	(Mexico) Roberto González R	(Mexico) Herdez Competition (United States) Dale Coyne Racing	2	--	--	--	1	--	--	3
25	(United States) Herta	(United States) PK Racing	1	--	--	--	--	--	--	2
26	(Brazil) Sperafico R	(United States) Dale Coyne Racing	2	--	--	--	--	--	--	0
27	(Mexico) Díaz R	(United States) Walker Racing	1	--	--	--	--	--	--	0

* Alex Tagliani started on pole at Milwaukee but was not awarded the bonus point for it when the qualification session was rained out. The grid was set by practice times. This result is not counted in Tagliani's season total in this table.

== See also ==
- 2003 Toyota Atlantic Championship season
- 2003 Indianapolis 500
- 2003 IndyCar Series
- 2003 Infiniti Pro Series season

== Bibliography ==
- Shaw, Jeremy, ed. (2004). Autocourse Champ Car Official Yearbook 2003-2004. Richmond, Surrey: Hazleton Publishing. ISBN 978-1-903135-33-4.
