= 2003 Centrix Financial Grand Prix of Denver =

(United States) 2003 Denver
Race details
- Race 15 of 18 in the 2003 CART season
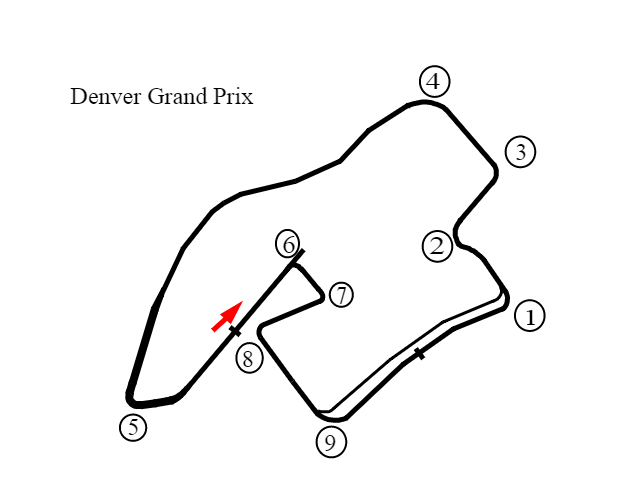
- Date: August 31, 2003
- Official name: 2003 Centrix Financial Grand Prix of Denver
- Location: Streets of Denver; Denver, Colorado, United States
- Course: Temporary Street Course; 1.647 mi / 2.651 km
- Distance: 106 laps 174.582 mi / 281.006 km
- Weather: Mostly cloudy with temperatures reaching up to 70 °F (21 °C); wind speeds approaching 9.9 miles per hour (15.9 km/h)

Pole position
- Driver: (Brazil) Bruno Junqueira (Newman/Haas Racing)
- Time: 1:01.438

Fastest lap
- Driver: (Brazil) Mario Haberfeld (Mi-Jack Conquest Racing)
- Time: 1:02.082 (on lap 100 of 106)

Podium
- First: (Brazil) Bruno Junqueira (Newman/Haas Racing)
- Second: (France) Sébastien Bourdais (Newman/Haas Racing)
- Third: (Spain) Oriol Servià (Patrick Racing)

The 2003 Centrix Financial Grand Prix of Denver was the fifteenth round of the 2003 CART World Series season, held on August 31, 2003 on the streets of Denver, Colorado.

== Qualifying results ==
Pos	Nat	Name	Team	Qual 1	Qual 2	Best
1	(Brazil)	Bruno Junqueira	Newman/Haas Racing	1:01.438	-	1:01.438
2	(Spain)	Oriol Servià	Patrick Racing	1:02.303	1:01.477	1:01.477
3	(France)	Sébastien Bourdais	Newman/Haas Racing	1:02.262	1:01.547	1:01.547
4	(Mexico)	Adrian Fernández	Fernández Racing	1:01.583	1:03.821	1:01.583
5	(Portugal)	Tiago Monteiro	Fittipaldi-Dingman Racing	1:02.281	1:01.628	1:01.628
6	(Canada)	Patrick Carpentier	Team Player's	1:02.165	1:01.804	1:01.804
7	(United Kingdom)	Darren Manning	Walker Racing	1:01.869	1:02.005	1:01.869
8	(Brazil)	Mario Haberfeld	Mi-Jack Conquest Racing	1:02.100	1:02.050	1:02.050
9	(Canada)	Paul Tracy	Team Player's	1:02.056	1:03.001	1:02.056
10	(Mexico)	Michel Jourdain Jr.	Team Rahal	1:02.381	1:02.141	1:02.141
11	(Canada)	Alex Tagliani	Rocketsports Racing	1:03.463	1:02.287	1:02.287
12	(United States)	Ryan Hunter-Reay	American Spirit Team Johansson	1:03.053	1:02.447	1:02.447
13	(United States)	Jimmy Vasser	American Spirit Team Johansson	1:02.944	1:03.290	1:02.944
14	(Mexico)	Mario Domínguez	Herdez Competition	1:03.732	1:02.993	1:02.993
15	(Mexico)	Rodolfo Lavín	Walker Racing	1:03.166	1:03.913	1:03.166
16	(Brazil)	Roberto Moreno	Herdez Competition	1:03.275	1:03.296	1:03.275
17	(Finland)	Mika Salo	PK Racing	1:03.875	1:04.645	1:03.875
18	(Brazil)	Gualter Salles	Dale Coyne Racing	1:03.891	1:09.964	1:03.891
19	(United States)	Geoff Boss	Dale Coyne Racing	1:04.193	1:06.592	1:04.193

== Race ==
Pos	No	Driver	Team	Laps	Time/Retired	Grid	Points
1	1	(Brazil) Bruno Junqueira	Newman/Haas Racing	106	2:03:10.259	1	22
2	2	(France) Sébastien Bourdais	Newman/Haas Racing	106	+0.335 secs	3	16
3	20	(Spain) Oriol Servià	Patrick Racing	106	+12.495 secs	2	15
4	3	(Canada) Paul Tracy	Team Player's	106	+13.318 secs	9	12
5	51	(Mexico) Adrian Fernández	Fernández Racing	106	+17.715 secs	4	10
6	9	(Mexico) Michel Jourdain Jr.	Team Rahal	106	+18.781 secs	10	8
7	55	(Mexico) Mario Domínguez	Herdez Competition	106	+19.263 secs	14	6
8	15	(United Kingdom) Darren Manning	Walker Racing	106	+25.590 secs	7	5
9	33	(Canada) Alex Tagliani	Rocketsports Racing	106	+26.916 secs	11	4
10	34	(Brazil) Mario Haberfeld	Mi-Jack Conquest Racing	106	+50.699 secs	8	3
11	12	(United States) Jimmy Vasser	American Spirit Team Johansson	106	+55.233 secs	13	2
12	11	(United States) Geoff Boss	Dale Coyne Racing	101	+ 5 Laps	19	1
13	7	(Portugal) Tiago Monteiro	Fittipaldi-Dingman Racing	86	Contact	5	0
14	27	(Finland) Mika Salo	PK Racing	84	Contact	17	0
15	31	(United States) Ryan Hunter-Reay	American Spirit Team Johansson	80	Fire	12	0
16	4	(Brazil) Roberto Moreno	Herdez Competition	77	Contact	16	0
17	32	(Canada) Patrick Carpentier	Team Player's	61	Contact	6	0
18	19	(Brazil) Gualter Salles	Dale Coyne Racing	33	Mechanical	18	0
19	5	(Mexico) Rodolfo Lavín	Walker Racing	2	Contact	15	0

== Caution flags ==
Laps	Cause
1	Yellow start
3-5	Domínguez (55), Lavín (5) & Moreno (4) contact
61-64	Carpentier (32) contact
78-83	Moreno (4) contact; Hunter-Reay (31) pit fire; Salo (27) contact

== Notes ==
Laps	Leader
1-32	Bruno Junqueira
33-62	Oriol Servià
63-106	Bruno Junqueira

Driver	Laps led
Bruno Junqueira	76
Oriol Servià	30

- New Track Record Bruno Junqueira 1:01.438 (Qualification Session #1)
- New Race Record Bruno Junqueira 2:03:10.259
- Average Speed 85.044 mph

Previous race: 2003 Molson Indy Montreal	Champ Car World Series; 2003 season	Next race: 2003 Grand Prix Americas
Previous race: 2002 Shell Grand Prix of Denver	2003 Centrix Financial Grand Prix of Denver	Next race: 2004 Centrix Financial Grand Prix of Denver
