= 2003 Milwaukee Mile Centennial 250 =

(United States) 2003 Milwaukee
Race details
- Race 6 of 18 in the 2003 CART season
- Milwaukee Mile Track Layout
- Date: May 31, 2003
- Official name: Milwaukee Mile Centennial 250 Presented by Miller Lite and Argent Mortgage
- Location: Milwaukee Mile, West Allis, Wisconsin, United States
- Course: 1 Mile Oval; 1.000 mi / 1.609 km
- Distance: 250 laps 250 mi / 402.336 km
- Weather: Clear and Cold (Night Race)

Pole position
- Driver: No Pole Awarded (Rain)

Fastest lap
- Driver: (Canada) Patrick Carpentier (Team Player's)
- Time: 21.820 (on lap 246 of 250)

Podium
- First: (Mexico) Michel Jourdain Jr. (Team Rahal)
- Second: (Spain) Oriol Servià (Patrick Racing)
- Third: (Canada) Patrick Carpentier (Team Player's)

Chronology
Previous	Next
2002	2004

The 2003 Milwaukee Mile Centennial 250 was the sixth round of the 2003 CART World Series season, held on May 31, 2003 at the Milwaukee Mile in West Allis, Wisconsin. The race was the first night race in CART history.

== Qualifying results ==
The qualification session was rained out, so the grid was set by times from the first practice session, which was led by Alex Tagliani. The usual point for pole was not awarded.

== Race ==
=== Box Score ===
Pos	No	Driver	Team	Laps	Time/Retired	Grid	Points
1	9	(Mexico) Michel Jourdain Jr.	Team Rahal	250	2:16:45.692	2	21 (1)
2	20	(Spain) Oriol Servià	Patrick Racing	250	+0.5 secs	7	16
3	32	(Canada) Patrick Carpentier	Team Player's	250	+0.7 secs	4	14
4	15	(United Kingdom) Darren Manning	Walker Racing	250	+1.2 secs	11	12
5	33	(Canada) Alex Tagliani	Rocketsports Racing	250	+2.2 secs	1	10
6	51	(Mexico) Adrian Fernández	Fernández Racing	250	+3.1 secs	5	8
7	34	(Brazil) Mario Haberfeld	Mi-Jack Conquest Racing	250	+4.2 secs	10	6
8	55	(Mexico) Mario Domínguez	Herdez Competition	250	+5.6 secs	12	5
9	2	(France) Sébastien Bourdais	Newman/Haas Racing	250	+5.9 secs	13	4
10	7	(Portugal) Tiago Monteiro	Fittipaldi-Dingman Racing	250	+7.7 secs	9	3
11	12	(United States) Jimmy Vasser	American Spirit Team Johansson	250	+9.1 secs	6	2
12	3	(Canada) Paul Tracy	Team Player's	249	+ 1 Lap	3	1
13	11	(Brazil) Gualter Salles	Dale Coyne Racing	240	+ 10 Laps	18	0
14	5	(Mexico) Rodolfo Lavín	Walker Racing	225	Accident	14	0
15	19	(Switzerland) Joël Camathias	Dale Coyne Racing	150	Accident	19	0
16	31	(United States) Ryan Hunter-Reay	American Spirit Team Johansson	85	Accident	17	0
17	1	(Brazil) Bruno Junqueira	Newman/Haas Racing	3	Accident	8	0
18	27	(France) Patrick Lemarié	PK Racing	3	Accident	16	0
19	4	(Brazil) Roberto Moreno	Herdez Competition	3	Accident	15	0

- Average Speed: 113.190 mph (182.162 km/h)
- (1) indicates the point total includes 1 bonus polint for leading the most laps.

=== Caution flags ===
From lap	To lap	Total laps	Reason
1	2	2	Yellow start
4	18	15	Junqueira (1), Moreno (4) & Lemarié (27) accident
86	107	22	Hunter-Reay (31) accident
154	168	15	Camathias (19) Accident
214	224	10	Tracy (3) loose wheel
226	238	13	Lavín (5) contact
239	239	1	Yellow restart

=== Lap Leaders ===
From lap	To lap	Total laps	Leader
1	2	2	Alex Tagliani
3	59	57	Michel Jourdain Jr.
60	72	13	Patrick Carpentier
73	73	1	Mario Domínguez
74	250	177	Michel Jourdain Jr.

=== Total laps led ===
Driver	Laps led
Michel Jourdain Jr.	234
Patrick Carpentier	13
Alex Tagliani	2
Mario Domínguez	1

== Standings after the race ==
Drivers' Championship standings
Rank	+/–	Driver	Points
1	2	(Mexico) Michel Jourdain Jr.	77
2		(Canada) Paul Tracy	67 (−10)
3	2	(Brazil) Bruno Junqueira	66 (−11)
4		(France) Sébastien Bourdais	53 (−24)
5	1	(Canada) Patrick Carpentier	48 (−29)

- Note: Only the top five positions are included for the drivers' standings.

Previous race: 2003 German 500	Champ Car World Series; 2003 season	Next race: 2003 Grand Prix of Monterey
Previous race: 2002 Miller Lite 250	Milwaukee Mile	Next race: 2004 Time Warner Cable Road Runner 250
