= 2003 Grand Prix of Monterey =

(United States) 2003 Laguna Seca
Race details
- Race 7 of 18 in the 2003 CART season
- Laguna Seca Track Layout
- Date: June 15, 2003
- Official name: Grand Prix of Monterey
- Location: Mazda Raceway Laguna Seca, Monterey, California, United States
- Course: Permanent Road Course; 2.238 mi / 3.602 km
- Distance: 87 laps 194.706 mi / 313.374 km
- Weather: Clear and Cool

Pole position
- Driver: (Canada) Patrick Carpentier (Team Player's)
- Time: 1:09.575

Fastest lap
- Driver: (Canada) Patrick Carpentier (Team Player's)
- Time: 1:11.898 (on lap 81 of 87)

Podium
- First: (Canada) Patrick Carpentier (Team Player's)
- Second: (Brazil) Bruno Junqueira (Newman/Haas Racing)
- Third: (Canada) Paul Tracy (Team Player's)

The 2003 Grand Prix of Monterey was the seventh round of the 2003 CART World Series season, held on June 15, 2003 at Mazda Raceway Laguna Seca in Monterey, California.

== Qualifying results ==
Pos	Nat	Name	Team	Qual 1	Qual 2	Best
1	(Canada)	Patrick Carpentier	Team Player's	1:10.314	1:09.575	1:09.575
2	(Brazil)	Bruno Junqueira	Newman/Haas Racing	1:10.040	1:09.794	1:09.794
3	(Canada)	Paul Tracy	Team Player's	1:10.341	1:09.671	1:09.671
4	(France)	Sébastien Bourdais	Newman/Haas Racing	1:10.701	1:10.099	1:10.099
5	(Mexico)	Adrian Fernández	Fernández Racing	1:10.846	1:10.228	1:10.228
6	(Brazil)	Mario Haberfeld	Mi-Jack Conquest Racing	1:10.753	1:10.244	1:10.244
7	(United Kingdom)	Darren Manning	Walker Racing	1:11.786	1:10.531	1:10.531
8	(United States)	Jimmy Vasser	American Spirit Team Johansson	1:11.222	1:10.538	1:10.538
9	(Brazil)	Roberto Moreno	Herdez Competition	1:11.298	1:10.573	1:10.573
10	(Spain)	Oriol Servià	Patrick Racing	1:11.227	1:10.597	1:10.597
11	(Mexico)	Mario Domínguez	Herdez Competition	1:11.210	1:10.800	1:10.800
12	(United States)	Bryan Herta	PK Racing	1:11.297	1:10.943	1:10.943
13	(Mexico)	Michel Jourdain Jr.	Team Rahal	1:10.970	-**	1:10.970
14	(Canada)	Alex Tagliani	Rocketsports Racing	1:11.593	1:11.025	1:11.025
15	(Portugal)	Tiago Monteiro	Fittipaldi-Dingman Racing	-*	1:11.354	1:11.354
16	(Mexico)	Rodolfo Lavín	Walker Racing	1:12.302	1:11.430	1:11.430
17	(United States)	Ryan Hunter-Reay	American Spirit Team Johansson	1:12.614	1:11.450	1:11.450
18	(Switzerland)	Joël Camathias	Dale Coyne Racing	1:12.453	1:11.455	1:11.455
19	(United States)	Geoff Boss	Dale Coyne Racing	1:13.975	1:12.802	1:12.802

*Tiago Montiero did not set a time in the first qualification session after damaging his car prior to the session. He used his backup car in the second qualification session.
**Michel Jourdain set the fastest time in the second qualification session (1:09.530) but his time was disallowed after his car was found to be underweight during tech inspection.

== Race ==
Pos	No	Driver	Team	Laps	Time/Retired	Grid	Points
1	32	(Canada) Patrick Carpentier	Team Player's	87	1:48:11.023	1	22
2	1	(Brazil) Bruno Junqueira	Newman/Haas Racing	87	+0.8 secs	2	17
3	3	(Canada) Paul Tracy	Team Player's	87	+28.6 secs	3	14
4	9	(Mexico) Michel Jourdain Jr.	Team Rahal	87	+40.8 secs	13	12
5	34	(Brazil) Mario Haberfeld	Mi-Jack Conquest Racing	87	+42.1 secs	6	10
6	20	(Spain) Oriol Servià	Patrick Racing	87	+1:00.2	10	8
7	51	(Mexico) Adrian Fernández	Fernández Racing	87	+1:01.4	5	6
8	12	(United States) Jimmy Vasser	American Spirit Team Johansson	87	+1:01.8	8	5
9	7	(Portugal) Tiago Monteiro	Fittipaldi-Dingman Racing	86	+ 1 Lap	15	4
10	55	(Mexico) Mario Domínguez	Herdez Competition	86	+ 1 Lap	11	3
11	27	(United States) Bryan Herta	PK Racing	86	+ 1 Lap	12	2
12	31	(United States) Ryan Hunter-Reay	American Spirit Team Johansson	86	+ 1 Lap	17	1
13	19	(Switzerland) Joël Camathias	Dale Coyne Racing	85	+ 2 Laps	18	0
14	33	(Canada) Alex Tagliani	Rocketsports Racing	85	+ 2 Laps	14	0
15	4	(Brazil) Roberto Moreno	Herdez Competition	85	+ 2 Laps	9	0
16	11	(United States) Geoff Boss	Dale Coyne Racing	83	Mechanical	19	0
17	2	(France) Sébastien Bourdais	Newman/Haas Racing	77	Mechanical	4	0
18	15	(United Kingdom) Darren Manning	Walker Racing	12	Mechanical	7	0
19	5	(Mexico) Rodolfo Lavín	Walker Racing	10	Mechanical	16	0

== Caution flags ==
Laps	Cause
1	Yellow start

== Notes ==
Laps / Leader; 1-87 / Patrick Carpentier	Driver / Laps led; Patrick Carpentier / 87

- New Race Record Patrick Carpentier 1:48:11.023
- Average Speed 107.986 mph

Previous race: 2003 Milwaukee Mile Centennial 250	Champ Car World Series; 2003 season	Next race: 2003 G.I. Joe's 200
Previous race: 2002 Bridgestone Grand Prix of Monterey	2003 Grand Prix of Monterey	Next race: 2004 Bridgestone Grand Prix of Monterey
