= 2003 G.I. Joe's 200 =

(United States) 2003 Portland
Race details
- Race 8 of 18 in the 2003 CART season
- Portland International Raceway Track Layout
- Date: June 22, 2003
- Official name: 2003 G.I. Joe's 200
- Location: Portland International Raceway; Portland, Oregon, United States
- Course: Permanent Road Course; 1.969 mi / 3.169 km
- Distance: 100 laps 196.900 mi / 316.900 km
- Weather: Cloudy and Cool

Pole position
- Driver: (Canada) Paul Tracy (Team Player's)
- Time: 58.793

Fastest lap
- Driver: (Canada) Alex Tagliani (Rocketsports Racing)
- Time: 1:00.875 (on lap 95 of 100)

Podium
- First: (Mexico) Adrian Fernández (Fernández Racing)
- Second: (Canada) Paul Tracy (Team Player's)
- Third: (Canada) Alex Tagliani (Rocketsports Racing)

The 2003 G.I. Joe's 200 was the eighth round of the 2003 CART World Series season, held on June 22, 2003 at Portland International Raceway in Portland, Oregon.

== Qualifying results ==
Pos	Nat	Name	Team	Qual 1	Qual 2	Best
1	(Canada)	Paul Tracy	Team Player's	59.730	58.793	58.793
2	(Mexico)	Michel Jourdain Jr.	Team Rahal	59.397	58.838	58.838
3	(Mexico)	Adrian Fernández	Fernández Racing	59.538	58.948	58.948
4	(France)	Sébastien Bourdais	Newman/Haas Racing	59.943	58.976	58.976
5	(Canada)	Alex Tagliani	Rocketsports Racing	59.935	59.061	59.061
6	(Spain)	Oriol Servià	Patrick Racing	59.519	59.218	59.218
7	(United States)	Ryan Hunter-Reay	American Spirit Team Johansson	-*	59.219	59.219
8	(United Kingdom)	Darren Manning	Walker Racing	59.597	59.225	59.225
9	(United States)	Jimmy Vasser	American Spirit Team Johansson	59.433	59.392	59.392
10	(Canada)	Patrick Carpentier	Team Player's	1:00.324	59.455	59.455
11	(Brazil)	Bruno Junqueira	Newman/Haas Racing	59.639	59.464	59.464
12	(Brazil)	Mario Haberfeld	Mi-Jack Conquest Racing	1:00.638	59.505	59.505
13	(Mexico)	Rodolfo Lavín	Walker Racing	1:00.695	59.522	59.522
14	(Brazil)	Roberto Moreno	Herdez Competition	1:00.301	59.616	59.616
15	(Italy)	Max Papis	PK Racing	59.989	59.704	59.704
16	(Mexico)	Mario Domínguez	Herdez Competition	1:00.299	59.811	59.811
17	(Portugal)	Tiago Monteiro	Fittipaldi-Dingman Racing	1:00.371	-**	1:00.371
18	(United States)	Geoff Boss	Dale Coyne Racing	1:01.872	1:00.699	1:00.699
19	(Brazil)	Gualter Salles	Dale Coyne Racing	1:01.124	1:00.741	1:00.741

*Ryan Hunter-Reay's time in the first qualification session was disallowed after the car was found to be underweight during tech inspection.
**Tiago Montiero did not set a time in the second qualification session after his gearbox failed on his first lap.

== Race ==
Pos	No	Driver	Team	Laps	Time/Retired	Grid	Points
1	51	(Mexico) Adrian Fernández	Fernández Racing	100	1:56:16.626	3	20
2	3	(Canada) Paul Tracy	Team Player's	100	+2.3 secs	1	18
3	33	(Canada) Alex Tagliani	Rocketsports Racing	100	+4.5 secs	5	14
4	1	(Brazil) Bruno Junqueira	Newman/Haas Racing	100	+8.6 secs	11	12
5	20	(Spain) Oriol Servià	Patrick Racing	100	+10.0 secs	6	10
6	15	(United Kingdom) Darren Manning	Walker Racing	100	+10.9 secs	8	8
7	12	(United States) Jimmy Vasser	American Spirit Team Johansson	100	+11.2 secs	9	6
8	34	(Brazil) Mario Haberfeld	Mi-Jack Conquest Racing	100	+13.3 secs	12	5
9	4	(Brazil) Roberto Moreno	Herdez Competition	100	+14.5 secs	14	4
10	55	(Mexico) Mario Domínguez	Herdez Competition	100	+14.9 secs	16	3
11	5	(Mexico) Rodolfo Lavín	Walker Racing	100	+17.9 secs	13	2
12	9	(Mexico) Michel Jourdain Jr.	Team Rahal	99	+ 1 Lap	2	2
13	11	(United States) Geoff Boss	Dale Coyne Racing	96	+ 4 Laps	18	0
14	2	(France) Sébastien Bourdais	Newman/Haas Racing	91	Engine	4	0
15	27	(Italy) Max Papis	PK Racing	87	Contact	15	0
16	32	(Canada) Patrick Carpentier	Team Player's	73	Contact	10	0
17	31	(United States) Ryan Hunter-Reay	American Spirit Team Johansson	21	Clutch	7	0
18	19	(Brazil) Gualter Salles	Dale Coyne Racing	16	Oil leak	19	0
19	7	(Portugal) Tiago Monteiro	Fittipaldi-Dingman Racing	5	Gearbox	17	0

== Caution flags ==
Laps	Cause
1-2	Yellow start
15-18	Boss (11) off course
45-47	Tracy (3) & Jourdain (9) contact
74-77	Carpentier (32) contact
82-83	Debris
88-89	Papis (27) contact

== Notes ==
Laps	Leader
1-2	Paul Tracy
3-44	Michel Jourdain Jr.
45-72	Paul Tracy
73	Sébastien Bourdais
74-85	Paul Tracy
86-100	Adrian Fernández

Driver	Laps led
Paul Tracy	42
Michel Jourdain Jr.	42
Adrian Fernández	15
Sébastien Bourdais	1

- New Race Record Adrian Fernández 1:56:16.626
- Average Speed 101.602 mph

Previous race: 2003 Grand Prix of Monterey	Champ Car World Series; 2003 season	Next race: 2003 U.S. Bank Cleveland Grand Prix
Previous race: 2002 G.I. Joe's 200	2003 G.I. Joe's 200	Next race: 2004 Champ Car Grand Prix of Portland
