= 2003 Grand Prix of St. Petersburg =

Coordinates: 27°46′0.4″N 82°37′54.3″W

(United States) 2003 St. Petersburg
Race details
- Race 1 of 18 in the 2003 CART season
- St. Petersburg Track Layout
- Date: February 23, 2003
- Official name: Grand Prix of St. Petersburg
- Location: Albert Whitted Airport; St. Petersburg, Florida, United States
- Course: Temporary airport & street circuit 1.806 mi / 2.906 km
- Distance: 105 laps 189.630 mi / 305.130 km
- Weather: Sunny with ambient temperatures reaching 79.0 °F (26.1°C); Wind speeds reaching 11.10 mph (17.86 km/h).

Pole position
- Driver: (France) Sébastien Bourdais (Newman/Haas Racing)
- Time: 1:00.928

Fastest lap
- Driver: (France) Sébastien Bourdais (Newman/Haas Racing)
- Time: 1:01.825 (on lap 29 of 105)

Podium
- First: (Canada) Paul Tracy (Team Player's)
- Second: (Mexico) Michel Jourdain Jr. (Team Rahal)
- Third: (Brazil) Bruno Junqueira (Newman/Haas Racing)

Chronology
Next
2005

The 2003 Grand Prix of St. Petersburg was the first round of the 2003 CART World Series season, held on February 23, 2003, at Albert Whitted Airport and the surrounding streets of St. Petersburg, Florida.

== Report ==
French rookie Sébastien Bourdais took pole position at an average speed of 106.710 mph (171.733 km/h) for the Newman/Haas Racing team. Paul Tracy lined up alongside him, with Adrian Fernández and Patrick Carpentier on row two.

The race began under green, with Bourdais leading into turn one ahead of Tracy. At the end of the first lap, an incident between Bruno Junqueira and rookie Mario Haberfeld occurred when Haberfeld pushed Junqueira along the pit wall, and nearly drove straight into Michel Jourdain Jr. when the Mexican was turning into the first corner. On the third lap, Alex Tagliani struck the tire wall at turn 10, bringing out the first caution of the race.

Bourdais led until lap 31, when he lost the lead to Tiago Monteiro in the first scheduled pit stops. Tracy had pushed enough laps to come out ahead of Bourdais when the pack was finally shuffled after the stops. On lap 42, the Frenchman damaged his car into a concrete wall and had to pit for repairs, leaving him several laps down. This left Tracy unchallenged, the Canadian scoring the first victory of the 2003 season in his first race driving for Team Player's. Jourdain was second and Junqueira finished third.

== Qualifying results ==
Pos	Nat	Name	Team	Qual 1	Qual 2	Best
1	(France)	Sébastien Bourdais	Newman/Haas Racing	1:01.676	1:00.928	1:00.928
2	(Canada)	Paul Tracy	Team Player's	1:03.031	1:01.476	1:01.476
3	(Mexico)	Adrian Fernández	Fernández Racing	1:02.719	1:01.749	1:01.749
4	(Canada)	Patrick Carpentier	Team Player's	1:02.350	1:01.759	1:01.759
5	(Mexico)	Michel Jourdain Jr.	Team Rahal	1:02.512	1:01.812	1:01.812
6	(Brazil)	Mario Haberfeld	Mi-Jack Conquest Racing	1:02.720	1:01.865	1:01.865
7	(Brazil)	Bruno Junqueira	Newman/Haas Racing	1:01.918	1:01.980	1:01.918
8	(United States)	Jimmy Vasser	American Spirit Team Johansson	1:03.438	1:01.994	1:01.994
9	(Spain)	Oriol Servià	Patrick Racing	1:02.062	1:02.847	1:02.062
10	(Mexico)	Mario Domínguez	Herdez Competition	1:02.280	1:02.101	1:02.101
11	(United Kingdom)	Darren Manning	Walker Racing	1:03.448	1:02.239	1:02.239
12	(United States)	Ryan Hunter-Reay	American Spirit Team Johansson	1:04.347	1:02.306	1:02.306
13	(Canada)	Alex Tagliani	Rocketsports Racing	1:02.822	1:02.523	1:02.523
14	(France)	Patrick Lemarié	PK Racing	1:06.232	1:02.953	1:02.953
15	(Brazil)	Roberto Moreno	Herdez Competition	1:04.946	1:03.050	1:03.050
16	(Portugal)	Tiago Monteiro	Fittipaldi-Dingman Racing	1:05.170	1:03.987	1:03.987
17	(Switzerland)	Joël Camathias	Dale Coyne Racing	1:04.773	1:04.241	1:04.241
18	(Mexico)	Roberto González	Dale Coyne Racing	1:06.799	1:04.948	1:04.948
19	(Mexico)	Rodolfo Lavín	Walker Racing	-*	1:06.527	1:06.527

* Rodolfo Lavin's time from the first qualification session was withdrawn when he changed to a backup car for the second session.

== Race ==
Pos	No	Driver	Team	Laps	Time/Retired	Grid	Points
1	3	(Canada) Paul Tracy	Team Player's	105	2:04:28.904	2	21
2	9	(Mexico) Michel Jourdain Jr.	Team Rahal	105	+12.1 secs	5	16
3	1	(Brazil) Bruno Junqueira	Newman/Haas Racing	105	+16.6 secs	7	14
4	34	(Brazil) Mario Haberfeld	Mi-Jack Conquest Racing	105	+41.4 secs	6	12
5	4	(Brazil) Roberto Moreno	Herdez Competition	105	+56.8 secs	15	10
6	12	(United States) Jimmy Vasser	American Spirit Team Johansson	104	+ 1 Lap	8	8
7	7	(Portugal) Tiago Monteiro	Fittipaldi-Dingman Racing	104	+ 1 Lap	16	6
8	32	(Canada) Patrick Carpentier	Team Player's	103	+ 2 Laps	4	5
9	19	(Switzerland) Joël Camathias	Dale Coyne Racing	103	+ 2 Laps	17	4
10	27	(France) Patrick Lemarié	PK Racing	102	+ 3 Laps	14	3
11	2	(France) Sébastien Bourdais	Newman/Haas Racing	97	+ 8 Laps	1	4
12	20	(Spain) Oriol Servià	Patrick Racing	96	+ 9 Laps	9	1
13	15	(United Kingdom) Darren Manning	Walker Racing	75	Clutch	11	0
14	55	(Mexico) Mario Domínguez	Herdez Competition	71	Contact	10	0
15	51	(Mexico) Adrian Fernández	Fernández Racing	69	Contact	3	0
16	31	(United States) Ryan Hunter-Reay	American Spirit Team Johansson	61	Contact	12	0
17	11	(Mexico) Roberto González	Dale Coyne Racing	21	Off Course	18	0
18	5	(Mexico) Rodolfo Lavín	Walker Racing	12	Contact	19	0
19	33	(Canada) Alex Tagliani	Rocketsports Racing	3	Contact	13	0

== Caution flags ==
Laps	Cause
5-7	Tagliani (33) contact
13-14	Lavín (5) spin
16-17	Lemarié (27) spin
48-50	Carpentier (32) contact
62-67	Hunter-Reay (31) contact

== Notes ==
Laps	Leader
1-30	Sébastien Bourdais
31-34	Tiago Monteiro
35-105	Paul Tracy

Driver	Laps led
Paul Tracy	71
Sébastien Bourdais	30
Tiago Monteiro	4

- New Track Record Sébastien Bourdais 1:00.928 (Qualification Session #2)
- New Race Record Paul Tracy 2:04:28.904
- Average Speed 91.401 mph

Previous race: 2002 Gran Premio Telmex-Gigante; Previous Season	Champ Car World Series; 2003 season	Next race: 2003 Tecate Telmex Monterrey Grand Prix
Previous race: First Event	2003 Grand Prix of St. Petersburg	Next race: 2005 Honda Grand Prix of St. Petersburg; IndyCar Series event
