= 2003 Molson Indy Vancouver =

(Canada) 2003 Vancouver
Race details
- Race 10 of 18 in the 2003 CART season
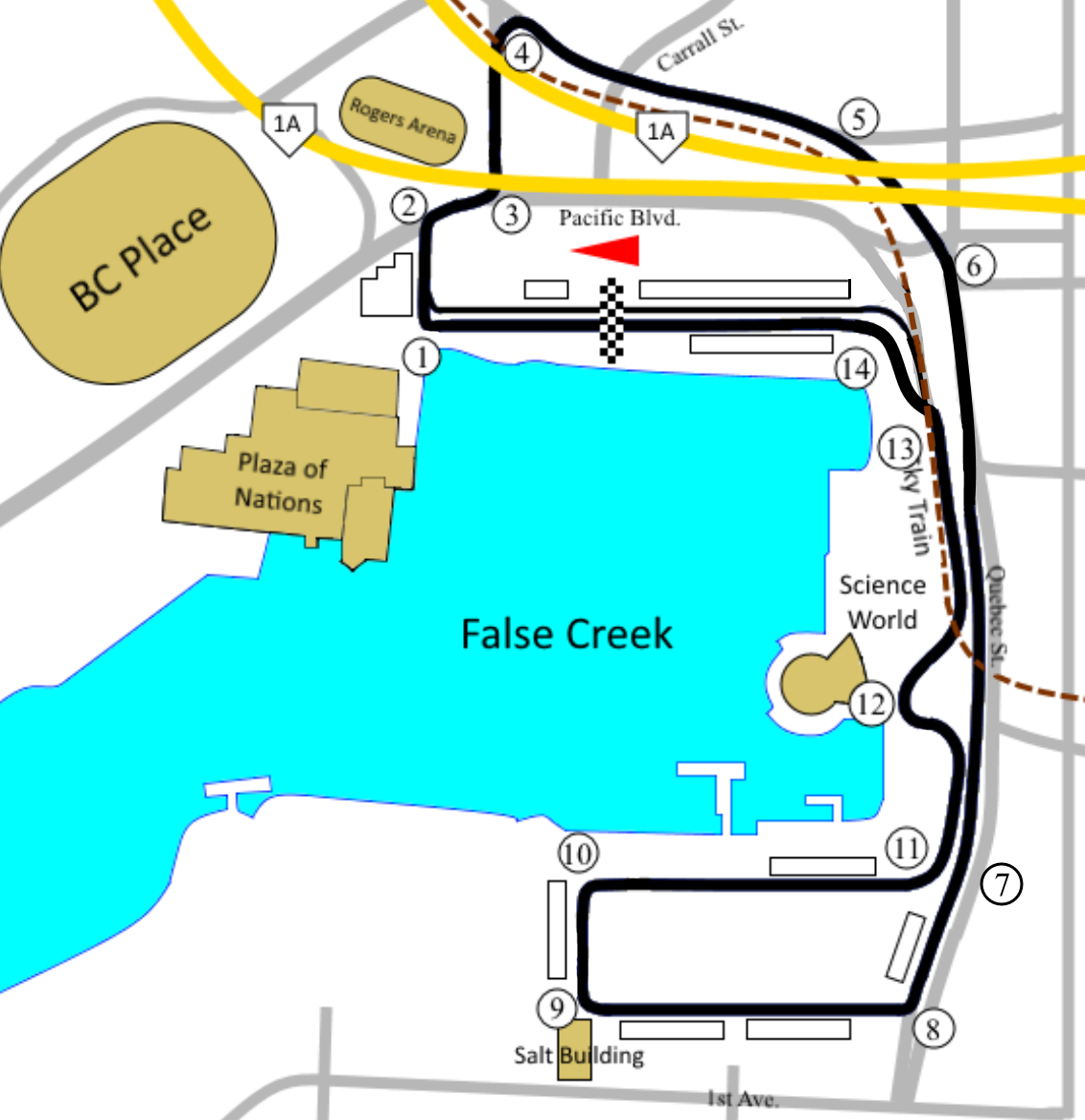
- Date: July 27, 2003
- Official name: 2003 Molson Indy Vancouver
- Location: Concord Pacific Place; Vancouver, British Columbia, Canada
- Course: Temporary Street Circuit; 1.781 mi / 2.866 km
- Distance: 100 laps 178.100 mi / 286.600 km
- Weather: Clear skies with temperatures reaching a high of 25.6 °C (78.1 °F); dropping down to 19.4 °C (66.9 °F) by the end of the event

Pole position
- Driver: (Canada) Paul Tracy (Team Player's)
- Time: 1:00.926

Fastest lap
- Driver: (France) Sébastien Bourdais (Newman/Haas Racing)
- Time: 1:02.011 (on lap 98 of 100)

Podium
- First: (Canada) Paul Tracy (Team Player's)
- Second: (Brazil) Bruno Junqueira (Newman/Haas Racing)
- Third: (France) Sébastien Bourdais (Newman/Haas Racing)

The 2003 Molson Indy Vancouver was the eleventh round of the 2003 CART World Series season, held on July 27, 2003 on the streets of Concord Pacific Place in Vancouver, British Columbia, Canada.

== Qualifying results ==
Pos	Nat	Name	Team	Qual 1	Qual 2	Best
1	(Canada)	Paul Tracy	Team Player's	1:01.862	1:00.926	1:00.926
2	(Brazil)	Bruno Junqueira	Newman/Haas Racing	1:01.845	1:01.070	1:01.070
3	(Brazil)	Roberto Moreno	Herdez Competition	1:02.216	1:01.172	1:01.172
4	(Mexico)	Michel Jourdain Jr.	Team Rahal	1:02.350	1:01.582	1:01.582
5	(France)	Sébastien Bourdais	Newman/Haas Racing	1:01.921	1:01.617	1:01.617
6	(Canada)	Patrick Carpentier	Team Player's	1:02.348	1:01.691	1:01.691
7	(Canada)	Alex Tagliani	Rocketsports Racing	1:02.032	1:01.816	1:01.816
8	(United Kingdom)	Darren Manning	Walker Racing	1:02.222	1:02.032	1:02.032
9	(Spain)	Oriol Servià	Patrick Racing	1:02.103	1:02.063	1:02.063
10	(Brazil)	Mario Haberfeld	Mi-Jack Conquest Racing	1:02.838	1:02.344	1:02.344
11	(Portugal)	Tiago Monteiro	Fittipaldi-Dingman Racing	1:05.754	1:02.351	1:02.351
12	(Mexico)	Mario Domínguez	Herdez Competition	1:03.033	1:02.373	1:02.373
13	(United States)	Jimmy Vasser	American Spirit Team Johansson	1:03.461	1:02.458	1:02.458
14	(Mexico)	Adrian Fernández	Fernández Racing	1:02.469	1:02.902	1:02.469
15	(Italy)	Max Papis	PK Racing	1:02.999	1:02.800	1:02.800
16	(United States)	Ryan Hunter-Reay	American Spirit Team Johansson	1:03.317	1:03.347	1:03.317
17	(Brazil)	Gualter Salles	Dale Coyne Racing	1:03.928	1:03.388	1:03.388
18	(Mexico)	Rodolfo Lavín	Walker Racing	1:03.437	1:03.705	1:03.437
19	(United States)	Geoff Boss	Dale Coyne Racing	1:04.316	1:04.259	1:04.259

== Race ==
Pos	No	Driver	Team	Laps	Time/Retired	Grid	Points
1	3	(Canada) Paul Tracy	Team Player's	100	1:57:54.322	1	22
2	1	(Brazil) Bruno Junqueira	Newman/Haas Racing	100	+17.8 secs	2	17
3	2	(France) Sébastien Bourdais	Newman/Haas Racing	100	+25.7 secs	5	14
4	9	(Mexico) Michel Jourdain Jr.	Team Rahal	100	+45.4 secs	4	12
5	15	(United Kingdom) Darren Manning	Walker Racing	98	+ 2 Laps	8	10
6	31	(United States) Ryan Hunter-Reay	American Spirit Team Johansson	98	+ 2 Laps	16	8
7	34	(Brazil) Mario Haberfeld	Mi-Jack Conquest Racing	98	+ 2 Laps	10	6
8	5	(Mexico) Rodolfo Lavín	Walker Racing	98	+ 2 Laps	17	5
9	27	(Italy) Max Papis	PK Racing	98	+ 2 Laps	15	4
10	55	(Mexico) Mario Domínguez	Herdez Competition	96	+ 4 Laps	12	3
11	12	(United States) Jimmy Vasser	American Spirit Team Johansson	90	Mechanical	13	2
12	51	(Mexico) Adrian Fernández	Fernández Racing	72	Mechanical	14	1
13	32	(Canada) Patrick Carpentier	Team Player's	60	Contact	6	0
14	33	(Canada) Alex Tagliani	Rocketsports Racing	30	Contact	7	0
15	7	(Portugal) Tiago Monteiro	Fittipaldi-Dingman Racing	27	Contact	11	0
16	20	(Spain) Oriol Servià	Patrick Racing	4	Contact	9	0
17	4	(Brazil) Roberto Moreno	Herdez Competition	3	Contact	3	0
18	19	(Brazil) Gualter Salles	Dale Coyne Racing	0	DNS Contact	-	0
19	11	(United States) Geoff Boss	Dale Coyne Racing	0	DNS Contact	-	0

== Caution flags ==
Laps	Cause
1-2	Yellow start - Salles (19) contact during warmup
4-6	Bourdais (2) & Moreno (4) contact; Monteiro (7) & Domínguez (55) contact
31-36	Monteiro (7) & Tagliani (33) contact

== Notes ==
Laps	Leader
1-2	Paul Tracy
3-23	Bruno Junqueira
24-60	Paul Tracy
61-62	Sébastien Bourdais
63-100	Paul Tracy

Driver	Laps led
Paul Tracy	77
Bruno Junqueira	21
Sébastien Bourdais	2

- New Race Record Paul Tracy 1:57:54.322
- Average Speed 90.632 mph

Previous race: 2003 Molson Indy Toronto	Champ Car World Series; 2003 season	Next race: 2003 Mario Andretti Grand Prix at Road America
Previous race: 2002 Molson Indy Vancouver	2003 Molson Indy Vancouver	Next race: 2004 Molson Indy Vancouver
