= 2003 Tecate Telmex Monterrey Grand Prix =

(Mexico) 2003 Monterrey
Race details
- Race 2 of 18 in the 2003 CART season
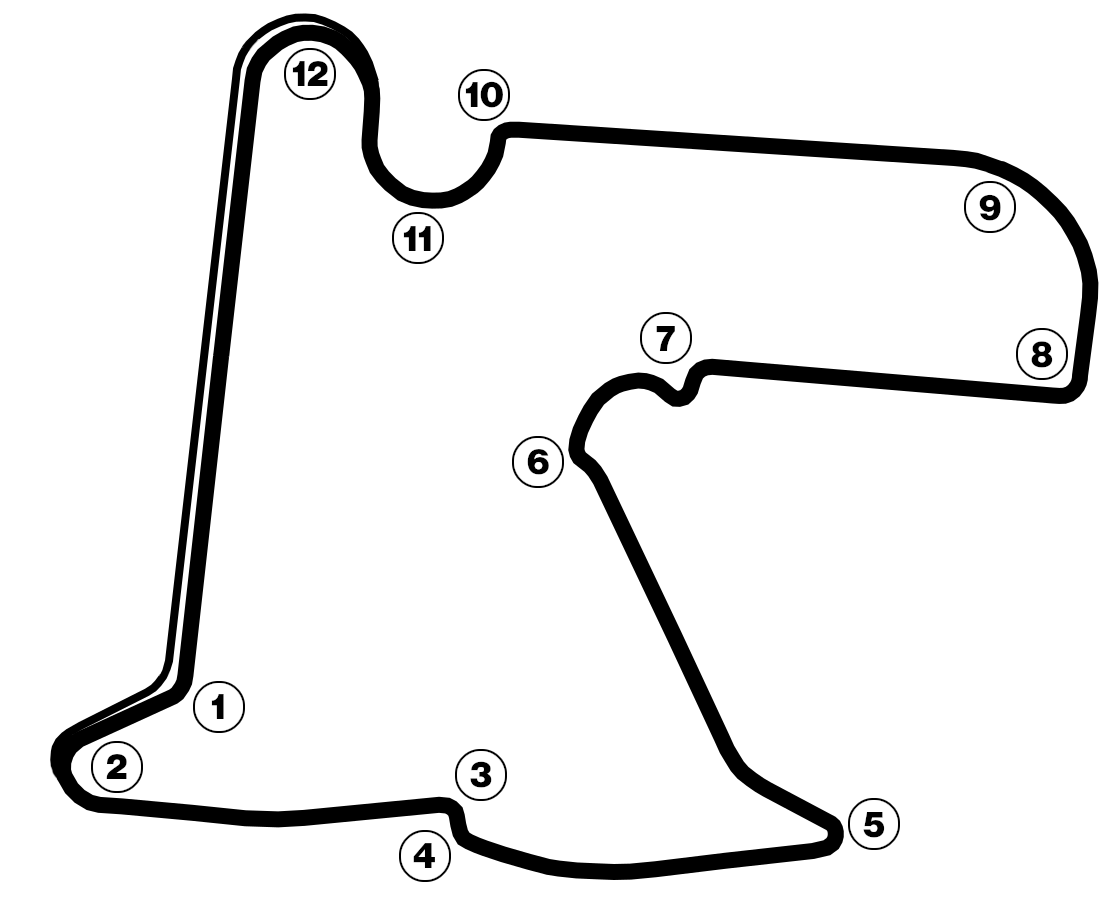
- Fundidora Park track layout
- Date: March 23, 2003
- Official name: Tecate Telmex Monterrey Grand Prix
- Location: Parque Fundidora; Monterrey, Nuevo León, Mexico
- Course: Temporary street circuit 2.104 mi / 3.386 km
- Distance: 85 laps 178.840 mi / 287.810 km
- Weather: Sunny

Pole position
- Driver: (France) Sébastien Bourdais (Newman/Haas Racing)
- Time: 1:14.938

Fastest lap
- Driver: (Brazil) Bruno Junqueira (Newman/Haas Racing)
- Time: 1:15.700 (on lap 59 of 85)

Podium
- First: (Canada) Paul Tracy (Team Player's)
- Second: (Mexico) Michel Jourdain Jr. (Team Rahal)
- Third: (Canada) Alex Tagliani (Rocketsports Racing)

The 2003 Tecate Telmex Monterrey Grand Prix was the second round of the 2003 CART World Series season, held on March 23, 2003 on the streets of Parque Fundidora in Monterrey, Nuevo León, Mexico.

== Qualifying results ==
Pos	Nat	Name	Team	Qual 1	Qual 2	Best
1	(France)	Sébastien Bourdais	Newman/Haas Racing	1:17.536	1:14.938	1:14.938
2	(Canada)	Paul Tracy	Team Player's	1:17.220	-	1:17.220
3	(Canada)	Alex Tagliani	Rocketsports Racing	1:17.555	1:15.437	1:15.437
4	(Spain)	Oriol Servià	Patrick Racing	1:17.373	1:15.476	1:15.476
5	(Mexico)	Michel Jourdain Jr.	Team Rahal	1:17.526	1:15.869	1:15.869
6	(Mexico)	Adrian Fernández	Fernández Racing	1:17.790	1:15.938	1:15.938
7	(Brazil)	Bruno Junqueira	Newman/Haas Racing	1:17.476	1:16.018	1:16.018
8	(Mexico)	Mario Domínguez	Herdez Competition	1:17.701	1:16.120	1:16.120
9	(United States)	Ryan Hunter-Reay	American Spirit Team Johansson	1:18.982	1:16.533	1:16.533
10	(Portugal)	Tiago Monteiro	Fittipaldi-Dingman Racing	1:19.949	1:16.554	1:16.554
11	(Brazil)	Mario Haberfeld	Mi-Jack Conquest Racing	1:18.524	1:16.911	1:16.911
12	(France)	Patrick Lemarié	PK Racing	1:19.541	1:16.931	1:16.931
13	(United Kingdom)	Darren Manning	Walker Racing	1:17.989	1:16.954	1:16.954
14	(Brazil)	Roberto Moreno	Herdez Competition	1:19.035	1:17.205	1:17.205
15	(Canada)	Patrick Carpentier	Team Player's	1:17.391	-	1:17.391
16	(United States)	Jimmy Vasser	American Spirit Team Johansson	1:18.038	-	1:18.038
17	(Malaysia)	Alex Yoong	Dale Coyne Racing	1:23.241	1:18.350	1:18.350
18	(Mexico)	Rodolfo Lavín	Walker Racing	1:21.292	1:18.593	1:18.593
19	(Switzerland)	Joël Camathias	Dale Coyne Racing	1:21.294	1:19.305	1:19.305

Paul Tracy and Jimmy Vasser missed the second qualification session after crashes damaged their cars during practice. Patrick Carpentier missed the same session because of an illness, choosing to rest for the race on Sunday.

== Race ==
Pos	No	Driver	Team	Laps	Time/Retired	Grid	Points
1	3	(Canada) Paul Tracy	Team Player's	85	2:03:04.677	2	22
2	9	(Mexico) Michel Jourdain Jr.	Team Rahal	85	+2.0 secs	5	16
3	33	(Canada) Alex Tagliani	Rocketsports Racing	85	+12.0 secs	3	14
4	51	(Mexico) Adrian Fernández	Fernández Racing	85	+14.2 secs	6	12
5	1	(Brazil) Bruno Junqueira	Newman/Haas Racing	85	+14.9 secs	7	10
6	4	(Brazil) Roberto Moreno	Herdez Competition	85	+30.9 secs	14	8
7	15	(United Kingdom) Darren Manning	Walker Racing	85	+35.2 secs	13	6
8	32	(Canada) Patrick Carpentier	Team Player's	84	+ 1 Lap	15	5
9	11	(Malaysia) Alex Yoong	Dale Coyne Racing	84	+ 1 Lap	17	4
10	27	(France) Patrick Lemarié	PK Racing	84	+ 1 Lap	12	3
11	19	(Switzerland) Joël Camathias	Dale Coyne Racing	84	+ 1 Lap	19	2
12	31	(United States) Ryan Hunter-Reay	American Spirit Team Johansson	83	+ 2 Laps	9	1
13	55	(Mexico) Mario Domínguez	Herdez Competition	83	+ 2 Laps	8	0
14	12	(United States) Jimmy Vasser	American Spirit Team Johansson	83	+ 2 Laps	16	0
15	5	(Mexico) Rodolfo Lavín	Walker Racing	81	+ 4 Laps	18	0
16	34	(Brazil) Mario Haberfeld	Mi-Jack Conquest Racing	67	Contact	11	0
17	2	(France) Sébastien Bourdais	Newman/Haas Racing	40	Contact	1	1
18	20	(Spain) Oriol Servià	Patrick Racing	38	Contact	4	0
19	7	(Portugal) Tiago Monteiro	Fittipaldi-Dingman Racing	2	Mechanical	10	0

== Caution flags ==
Laps	Cause
4-6	Monteiro (7) off course
14-15	Lemarié (27) stalled on course
17-18	Lavín (5) spin/stall
39-43	Servià (20) off course
78-80	Carpentier (32) stalled off course

== Notes ==
Laps	Leader
1-16	Sébastien Bourdais
17-85	Paul Tracy

Driver	Laps led
Paul Tracy	69
Sébastien Bourdais	16

- New Track Record Sébastien Bourdais 1:14.938 (Qualification Session #2)
- Average Speed 87.184 mph

Previous race: 2003 Grand Prix of St. Petersburg	Champ Car World Series; 2003 season	Next race: 2003 Toyota Grand Prix of Long Beach
Previous race: 2002 Tecate/Telmex Monterrey Grand Prix	2003 Tecate Telmex Monterrey Grand Prix	Next race: 2004 Tecate/Telmex Grand Prix of Monterrey
