= 2003 Gran Premio Telmex-Gigante =

2003 Mexico City
Race details
- Race 17 of 18 in the 2003 CART season
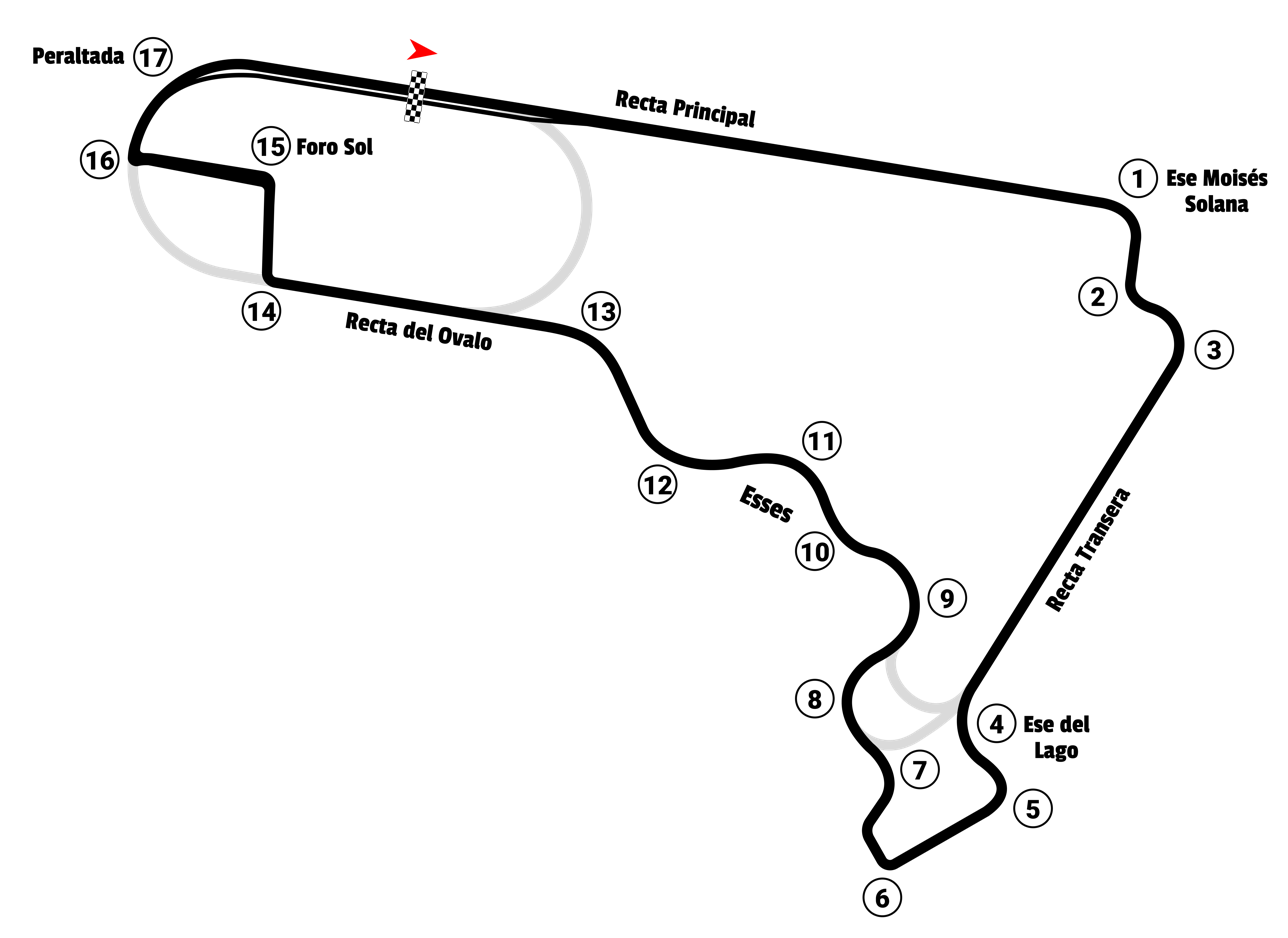
- Autódromo Hermanos Rodríguez Track Layout
- Date: October 12, 2003
- Official name: 2003 Gran Premio Telmex-Gigante Presented by Banamex/VISA
- Location: Autódromo Hermanos Rodríguez; Mexico City, Mexico
- Course: Permanent Road Course; 2.786 mi / 4.484 km
- Distance: 70 laps 195.020 mi / 313.880 km

Pole position
- Driver: (Canada) Paul Tracy (Team Player's)
- Time: 1:28.842

Fastest lap
- Driver: (United States) Ryan Hunter-Reay (American Spirit Team Johansson)
- Time: 1:29.066 (on lap 63 of 70)

Podium
- First: (Canada) Paul Tracy (Team Player's)
- Second: (France) Sébastien Bourdais (Newman/Haas Racing)
- Third: (Mexico) Mario Domínguez (Herdez Competition)

The 2003 Gran Premio Telmex-Gigante was the seventeenth round of the 2003 CART World Series season, held on October 12, 2003 at the Autódromo Hermanos Rodríguez in Mexico City, Mexico.

== Qualifying results ==
Pos	Nat	Name	Team	Qual 1	Qual 2	Best
1	(Canada)	Paul Tracy	Team Player's	1:28.842	1:29.201	1:28.842
2	(Portugal)	Tiago Monteiro	Fittipaldi-Dingman Racing	1:29.687	1:29.042	1:29.042
3	(Brazil)	Bruno Junqueira	Newman/Haas Racing	1:28.905	1:29.351	1:28.905
4	(France)	Sébastien Bourdais	Newman/Haas Racing	1:29.110	1:29.235	1:29.110
5	(United States)	Ryan Hunter-Reay	American Spirit Team Johansson	1:29.498	1:29.191	1:29.191
6	(United Kingdom)	Darren Manning	Walker Racing	1:29.580	1:29.193	1:29.193
7	(United States)	Jimmy Vasser	American Spirit Team Johansson	1:29.315	1:29.504	1:29.315
8	(Mexico)	Michel Jourdain Jr.	Team Rahal	1:29.387	1:29.375	1:29.375
9	(Canada)	Patrick Carpentier	Team Player's	1:29.616	1:29.449	1:29.449
10	(Mexico)	Luis Díaz	Walker Racing	1:30.478	1:29.546	1:29.546
11	(Mexico)	Mario Domínguez	Herdez Competition	1:29.890	1:29.611	1:29.611
12	(Finland)	Mika Salo	PK Racing	1:30.558	1:29.761	1:29.761
13	(Canada)	Alex Tagliani	Rocketsports Racing	1:29.882	1:30.383	1:29.882
14	(Brazil)	Mario Haberfeld	Mi-Jack Conquest Racing	1:30.096	1:29.958	1:29.958
15	(Mexico)	Adrian Fernández	Fernández Racing	1:30.044	1:30.372	1:30.044
16	(Spain)	Oriol Servià	Patrick Racing	1:30.383	1:30.510	1:30.383
17	(Mexico)	Rodolfo Lavín	Walker Racing	1:30.584	1:30.827	1:30.584
18	(Mexico)	Roberto González	Herdez Competition	1:31.162	1:31.687	1:31.162
19	(Brazil)	Gualter Salles	Dale Coyne Racing	1:31.927	1:31.442	1:31.442
20	(United States)	Geoff Boss	Dale Coyne Racing	1:31.847	1:31.626	1:31.626

== Race ==
Pos	No	Driver	Team	Laps	Time/Retired	Grid	Points
1	3	(Canada) Paul Tracy	Team Player's	70	1:56:51.396	1	22
2	2	(France) Sébastien Bourdais	Newman/Haas Racing	70	+1.782 secs	4	16
3	55	(Mexico) Mario Domínguez	Herdez Competition	70	+3.254 secs	11	14
4	9	(Mexico) Michel Jourdain Jr.	Team Rahal	70	+12.118 secs	8	12
5	27	(Finland) Mika Salo	PK Racing	70	+13.787 secs	12	10
6	7	(Portugal) Tiago Monteiro	Fittipaldi-Dingman Racing	70	+17.744 secs	2	9
7	1	(Brazil) Bruno Junqueira	Newman/Haas Racing	70	+18.080 secs	3	6
8	51	(Mexico) Adrian Fernández	Fernández Racing	70	+19.679 secs	15	5
9	15	(United Kingdom) Darren Manning	Walker Racing	70	+27.476 secs	6	4
10	4	(Mexico) Roberto González	Herdez Competition	70	+42.989 secs	18	3
11	31	(United States) Ryan Hunter-Reay	American Spirit Team Johansson	70	+52.190 secs	5	2
12	34	(Brazil) Mario Haberfeld	Mi-Jack Conquest Racing	70	+56.996 secs	14	1
13	20	(Spain) Oriol Servià	Patrick Racing	69	+ 1 Lap	16	0
14	32	(Canada) Patrick Carpentier	Team Player's	68	Mechanical	9	0
15	19	(Brazil) Gualter Salles	Dale Coyne Racing	53	Mechanical	19	0
16	33	(Canada) Alex Tagliani	Rocketsports Racing	40	Contact	13	0
17	12	(United States) Jimmy Vasser	American Spirit Team Johansson	40	Contact	7	0
18	5	(Mexico) Rodolfo Lavín	Walker Racing	20	Mechanical	17	0
19	25	(Mexico) Luis Díaz	Walker Racing	12	Mechanical	10	0
20	11	(United States) Geoff Boss	Dale Coyne Racing	4	Off course	20	0

== Caution flags ==
Laps	Cause
1	Yellow start
2	Vasser (12), Manning (15) & Fernández (51) contact
40-44	Vasser (12) & Tagliani (33) contact
46-47	Manning (15) & Gonzalez (4) contact

== Notes ==
Laps	Leader
1-57	Paul Tracy
58-63	Adrian Fernández
64-70	Paul Tracy

Driver	Laps led
Paul Tracy	64
Adrian Fernández	6

- New Race Record Paul Tracy 1:56:51.396
- Average Speed 100.133 mph

Previous race: 2003 Grand Prix Americas	Champ Car World Series; 2003 season	Next race: 2003 Lexmark Indy 300
Previous race: 2002 Gran Premio Telmex-Gigante	2003 Gran Premio Telmex-Gigante	Next race: 2004 Gran Premio Telmex/Tecate
