= 2003 Champ Car Grand Prix of Mid-Ohio =

(United States) 2003 Mid-Ohio
Race details
- Race 13 of 18 in the 2003 CART season
- Mid-Ohio Sports Car Course Track Layout
- Date: August 10, 2003
- Official name: 2003 Champ Car Grand Prix of Mid-Ohio
- Location: Mid-Ohio Sports Car Course, Lexington, Ohio, United States
- Course: Permanent Road Course; 2.258 mi / 3.634 km
- Distance: 92 laps 207.736 mi / 334.328 km
- Weather: Scattered Clouds

Pole position
- Driver: (Canada) Paul Tracy (Team Player's)
- Time: 1:07.058

Fastest lap
- Driver: (United States) Jimmy Vasser (American Spirit Team Johansson)
- Time: 1:08.366 (on lap 60 of 92)

Podium
- First: (Canada) Paul Tracy (Team Player's)
- Second: (Canada) Patrick Carpentier (Team Player's)
- Third: (United States) Ryan Hunter-Reay (American Spirit Team Johansson)

The 2003 Champ Car Grand Prix of Mid-Ohio was the thirteenth round of the 2003 CART World Series season, held on August 10, 2003 at the Mid-Ohio Sports Car Course in Lexington, Ohio. It was the last of 22 Champ Car events to take place at the track which was a fixture in the CART calendar for most of its history.

== Qualifying results ==
Pos	Nat	Name	Team	Qual 1	Qual 2	Best
1	(Canada)	Paul Tracy	Team Player's	1:07.204	1:07.058	1:07.058
2	(United States)	Ryan Hunter-Reay	American Spirit Team Johansson	1:07.875	1:07.074	1:07.074
3	(France)	Sébastien Bourdais	Newman/Haas Racing	1:07.699	1:07.130	1:07.130
4	(Mexico)	Michel Jourdain Jr.	Team Rahal	1:07.696	1:07.236	1:07.236
5	(Canada)	Patrick Carpentier	Team Player's	1:07.611	1:07.296	1:07.296
6	(Brazil)	Bruno Junqueira	Newman/Haas Racing	1:08.012	1:07.300	1:07.300
7	(Canada)	Alex Tagliani	Rocketsports Racing	1:07.477	1:07.739	1:07.477
8	(Spain)	Oriol Servià	Patrick Racing	1:07.801	1:07.529	1:07.529
9	(Mexico)	Mario Domínguez	Herdez Competition	1:07.652	1:07.798	1:07.652
10	(Mexico)	Adrian Fernández	Fernández Racing	1:08.052	1:07.678	1:07.678
11	(Brazil)	Roberto Moreno	Herdez Competition	1:07.804	1:08.070	1:07.804
12	(Portugal)	Tiago Monteiro	Fittipaldi-Dingman Racing	1:08.112	1:07.914	1:07.914
13	(United Kingdom)	Darren Manning	Walker Racing	1:08.002	1:07.964	1:07.964
14	(United States)	Jimmy Vasser	American Spirit Team Johansson	1:08.125	-	1:08.125
15	(Brazil)	Mario Haberfeld	Mi-Jack Conquest Racing	1:08.153	1:08.385	1:08.153
16	(Italy)	Max Papis	PK Racing	1:08.359	1:08.382	1:08.359
17	(Mexico)	Rodolfo Lavín	Walker Racing	1:08.585	1:08.461	1:08.461
18	(United States)	Geoff Boss	Dale Coyne Racing	1:08.777	1:10.157	1:08.777
19	(Brazil)	Gualter Salles	Dale Coyne Racing	1:09.021	1:08.785	1:08.785

== Race ==
Pos	No	Driver	Team	Laps	Time/Retired	Grid	Points
1	3	(Canada) Paul Tracy	Team Player's	92	1:56:45.737	1	23
2	32	(Canada) Patrick Carpentier	Team Player's	92	+0.610 secs	5	16
3	31	(United States) Ryan Hunter-Reay	American Spirit Team Johansson	92	+1.972 secs	2	14
4	9	(Mexico) Michel Jourdain Jr.	Team Rahal	92	+3.205 secs	4	12
5	2	(France) Sébastien Bourdais	Newman/Haas Racing	92	+4.054 secs	3	10
6	33	(Canada) Alex Tagliani	Rocketsports Racing	92	+7.925 secs	7	8
7	51	(Mexico) Adrian Fernández	Fernández Racing	92	+8.713 secs	10	6
8	15	(United Kingdom) Darren Manning	Walker Racing	92	+9.162 secs	13	5
9	27	(Italy) Max Papis	PK Racing	92	+10.508 secs	16	4
10	34	(Brazil) Mario Haberfeld	Mi-Jack Conquest Racing	92	+12.414 secs	15	3
11	7	(Portugal) Tiago Monteiro	Fittipaldi-Dingman Racing	91	+ 1 Lap	12	2
12	5	(Mexico) Rodolfo Lavín	Walker Racing	91	+ 1 Lap	17	1
13	1	(Brazil) Bruno Junqueira	Newman/Haas Racing	90	+ 2 Laps	6	0
14	11	(United States) Geoff Boss	Dale Coyne Racing	90	+ 2 Laps	18	0
15	12	(United States) Jimmy Vasser	American Spirit Team Johansson	82	Contact	14	0
16	55	(Mexico) Mario Domínguez	Herdez Competition	71	Mechanical	9	0
17	19	(Brazil) Gualter Salles	Dale Coyne Racing	46	Off course	19	0
18	20	(Spain) Oriol Servià	Patrick Racing	13	Contact	8	0
19	4	(Brazil) Roberto Moreno	Herdez Competition	9	Contact	11	0

== Caution flags ==
Laps	Cause
9-11	Moreno (4) contact
13-16	Servià (20) & Junqueira (1) contact
83-86	Vasser (12) contact

== Notes ==
Laps	Leader
1-24	Paul Tracy
25-37	Adrian Fernández
38-48	Paul Tracy
49-58	Tiago Monteiro
59-92	Paul Tracy

Driver	Laps led
Paul Tracy	69
Adrian Fernández	13
Tiago Monteiro	10

- Average Speed 106.251 mph

Previous race: 2003 Mario Andretti Grand Prix at Road America	Champ Car World Series; 2003 season	Next race: 2003 Molson Indy Montreal
Previous race: 2002 CART Grand Prix of Mid-Ohio	2003 Champ Car Grand Prix of Mid-Ohio	Next race: 2007 Honda 200; IndyCar Series Event
