= 2003 Lexmark Indy 300 =

Coordinates: 27°59′17.9″S 153°25′42.1″E

(Australia) 2003 Surfers Paradise
Race details
- Race 18 of 19 in the 2003 CART season
- Track map of the Surfers Paradise street circuit at Surfers Paradise, Australia.
- Date: 26 October, 2003
- Official name: Lexmark Indy 300
- Location: Surfers Paradise Street Circuit; Queensland, Australia
- Course: Temporary Street Circuit; 2.795 mi / 4.498 km
- Distance: 47 laps 131.365 mi / 211.406 km
- Weather: Thunderstorms with temperatures reaching up to 27.4 °C (81.3 °F)

Pole position
- Driver: (France) Sébastien Bourdais (Newman/Haas Racing)
- Time: 1:31.718

Fastest lap
- Driver: (Brazil) Roberto Moreno (Herdez Competition)
- Time: 1:35.561 (on lap 10 of 47)

Podium
- First: (United States) Ryan Hunter-Reay (American Spirit Team Johansson)
- Second: (United Kingdom) Darren Manning (Walker Racing)
- Third: (United States) Jimmy Vasser (American Spirit Team Johansson)

The 2003 Lexmark Indy 300 was the eighteenth last race of the 2003 CART World Series season, held on 26 October 2003 on the Surfers Paradise Street Circuit, Queensland, Australia. A hail storm 20 minutes into the race caused an hour long red flag period and shortened the race to 47 laps from the scheduled 65.

Ryan Hunter-Reay won the race, his first victory in top-level American open wheel racing, and Reynard's final win in CART competition (sweeping the podium positions). Neither of the two drivers who could still win the season championship, leader Paul Tracy and second-place Bruno Junqueira, finished in the Top 12 points-paying positions (though Junqueira received two bonus points on the weekend: one for having the fastest lap in Friday qualifying, and the other for leading the most laps in the race), meaning Tracy had a big enough lead to clinch the championship with one race to go.

== Final CART event ==
The event was to have been the penultimate race of the 2003 season, but it later became the final round after the 2003 King Taco 500 was canceled because of a wildfire near to the California Speedway venue. In December 2003 the CART World Series declared bankruptcy and as a result went out of business. Therefore, this race became the final completed CART sanctioned event, although the series would be reborn under new ownership as the Champ Car World Series in 2004.

== Qualifying results ==
Pos	Nat	Driver	Team	Car	Qual 1	Qual 2	Best
1	(France)	Sébastien Bourdais	Newman/Haas Racing	Lola B2/00 Ford-Cosworth	1:33.321	1:31.718	1:31.718
2	(Brazil)	Bruno Junqueira	Newman-Haas Racing	Lola B2/00 Ford-Cosworth	1:32.708	1:31.994	1:31.994
3	(Canada)	Paul Tracy	Team Player's	Lola B2/00 Ford-Cosworth	1:34.161	1:32.000	1:32.000
4	(Canada)	Alex Tagliani	Rocketsports Racing	Lola B2/00 Ford-Cosworth	-	1:32.135	1:32.135
5	(Mexico)	Adrian Fernández	Fernández Racing	Lola B2/00 Ford-Cosworth	1:33.668	1:32.436	1:32.436
6	(Spain)	Oriol Servià	Patrick Racing	Lola B2/00 Ford-Cosworth	1:34.317	1:32.731	1:32.731
7	(Brazil)	Roberto Moreno	Herdez Competition	Lola B2/00 Ford-Cosworth	1:34.313	1:32.732	1:32.732
8	(Mexico)	Mario Domínguez	Herdez Competition	Lola B2/00 Ford-Cosworth	1:35.017	1:32.908	1:32.908
9	(Mexico)	Michel Jourdain Jr.	Team Rahal	Lola B2/00 Ford-Cosworth	1:34.447	1:33.112	1:33.112
10	(Finland)	Mika Salo	PK Racing	Lola B2/00 Ford-Cosworth	1:35.506	1:33.187	1:33.187
11	(Canada)	Patrick Carpentier	Team Player's	Lola B2/00 Ford-Cosworth	1:34.808	1:33.437	1:33.437
12	(United States)	Ryan Hunter-Reay	American Spirit Team Johansson	Reynard 02i Ford-Cosworth	1:36.398	1:33.542	1:33.542
13	(Portugal)	Tiago Monteiro	Fittipaldi-Dingman Racing	Reynard 02i Ford-Cosworth	1:35.379	1:33.857	1:33.857
14	(United Kingdom)	Darren Manning	Walker Racing	Reynard 02i Ford-Cosworth	1:35.425	1:33.922	1:33.922
15	(United States)	Jimmy Vasser	American Spirit Team Johansson	Reynard 02i Ford-Cosworth	1:34.266	1:35.425	1:34.266
16	(Brazil)	Mario Haberfeld	Mi-Jack Conquest Racing	Reynard 02i Ford-Cosworth	1:35.821	1:34.299	1:34.299
17	(Brazil)	Gualter Salles	Dale Coyne Racing	Lola B2/00 Ford-Cosworth	1:36.495	1:34.646	1:34.646
18	(Mexico)	Rodolfo Lavín	Walker Racing	Reynard 02i Ford-Cosworth	-	1:36.075	1:36.075
19	(United States)	Geoff Boss	Dale Coyne Racing	Lola B2/00 Ford-Cosworth	-	1:37.247	1:37.247

== Race ==
Pos	No	Driver	Team	Laps	Time/retired	Grid	Points
1	31	(United States) Ryan Hunter-Reay	American Spirit Team Johansson	47	1:49:02.803	12	20
2	15	(United Kingdom) Darren Manning	Walker Racing	47	+1.546 secs	14	16
3	12	(United States) Jimmy Vasser	American Spirit Team Johansson	47	+3.792 secs	15	14
4	9	(Mexico) Michel Jourdain Jr.	Team Rahal	47	+5.315 secs	9	12
5	32	(Canada) Patrick Carpentier	Team Player's	47	+5.837 secs	11	10
6	19	(Brazil) Gualter Salles	Dale Coyne Racing	47	+8.180 secs	17	8
7	33	(Canada) Alex Tagliani	Rocketsports Racing	47	+10.131 secs	4	6
8	5	(Mexico) Rodolfo Lavín	Walker Racing	47	+11.673 secs	18	5
9	11	(United States) Geoff Boss	Dale Coyne Racing	47	+50.728 secs	19	4
10	55	(Mexico) Mario Domínguez	Herdez Competition	46	+ 1 Lap	8	3
11	27	(Finland) Mika Salo	PK Racing	46	+ 1 Lap	10	2
12	51	(Mexico) Adrian Fernández	Fernández Racing	46	+ 1 Lap	5	1
13	3	(Canada) Paul Tracy	Team Player's	45	+ 2 Laps	3	0
14	34	(Brazil) Mario Haberfeld	Mi-Jack Conquest Racing	43	+ 4 Laps	16	0
15	1	(Brazil) Bruno Junqueira	Newman/Haas Racing	36	Contact	2	2
16	4	(Brazil) Roberto Moreno	Herdez Competition	23	Contact	7	0
17	2	(France) Sébastien Bourdais	Newman-Haas Racing	11	Contact	1	1
18	7	(Portugal) Tiago Monteiro	Fittipaldi-Dingman Racing	3	Mechanical	13	0
19	20	(Spain) Oriol Servià	Patrick Racing	1	Contact	6	0

== Caution flags ==
Laps	Cause
1	Yellow start
2	Servià (20) contact
11-13	Bourdais (2) contact
14-15	Restart after red flag (rain)
16-17	Salo (27) spun/stalled
19-20	Tracy (3), Tagliani (33), Manning (15), Salles (19) & Moreno (4) contact
31-34	Tagliani (33) & Haberfeld (34) spun/stalled; Domínguez (55) loose wheel
37-39	Junqueira (1) & Haberfeld (34) contact; Haberfeld (34) stopped on course
41-42	Fernández (51) spun/stalled

== Notes ==
Laps	Leader
1-29	Bruno Junqueira
30-32	Michel Jourdain Jr.
33-47	Ryan Hunter-Reay

Driver	Laps led
Bruno Junqueira	29
Ryan Hunter-Reay	15
Michel Jourdain Jr.	2

- New Race Record Ryan Hunter-Reay 1:49:02.803
- Average Speed 72.280 mph

Previous race: 2003 Gran Premio Telmex-Gigante	Champ Car World Series; 2003 season	Next race: 2003 King Taco 500
Previous race: 2002 Honda Indy 300	2003 Lexmark Indy 300	Next race: 2004 Lexmark Indy 300
