= 2003 Toyota Grand Prix of Long Beach =

(United States) 2003 Long Beach
Race details
- Race 3 of 18 in the 2003 CART season
- Long Beach Track Layout
- Date: April 13, 2003
- Official name: Toyota Grand Prix of Long Beach
- Location: Long Beach Street Circuit; Long Beach, California, United States
- Course: Temporary street circuit 1.968 mi / 3.167 km
- Distance: 90 laps 177.120 mi / 285.030 km
- Weather: Mostly Cloudy

Pole position
- Driver: (Mexico) Michel Jourdain Jr. (Team Rahal)
- Time: 1:08.177

Fastest lap
- Driver: (Mexico) Michel Jourdain Jr. (Team Rahal)
- Time: 1:09.050 (on lap 77 of 90)

Podium
- First: (Canada) Paul Tracy (Team Player's)
- Second: (Mexico) Adrian Fernández (Fernández Racing)
- Third: (Brazil) Bruno Junqueira (Newman/Haas Racing)

Chronology
Previous	Next
2002	2004

The 2003 Toyota Grand Prix of Long Beach was the third round of the 2003 CART World Series season, held on April 13, 2003 on the Long Beach Street Circuit. This race was a new low in TV ratings for the series. Only 69,000 people watched the race on SPEED Channel, less than the 95,000 who attended the race.

== Qualifying results ==
Pos	Nat	Name	Team	Qual 1	Qual 2	Best
1	(Mexico)	Michel Jourdain Jr.	Team Rahal	1:09.530	1:08.177	1:08.177
2	(Canada)	Paul Tracy	Team Player's	1:09.079	1:08.729	1:09.079
3	(Canada)	Alex Tagliani	Rocketsports Racing	1:09.752	1:08.371	1:08.371
4	(Brazil)	Bruno Junqueira	Newman/Haas Racing	1:09.120	1:08.537	1:08.537
5	(France)	Sébastien Bourdais	Newman/Haas Racing	1:09.242	1:08.549	1:08.549
6	(Canada)	Patrick Carpentier	Team Player's	1:09.406	1:08.660	1:08.660
7	(Mexico)	Adrian Fernández	Fernández Racing	1:09.432	1:08.784	1:08.784
8	(Spain)	Oriol Servià	Patrick Racing	1:09.546	1:08.821	1:08.821
9	(Brazil)	Roberto Moreno	Herdez Competition	1:10.086	1:09.028	1:09.028
10	(United Kingdom)	Darren Manning	Walker Racing	1:10.707	1:09.135	1:09.135
11	(Mexico)	Mario Domínguez	Herdez Competition	1:09.993	1:09.222	1:09.222
12	(United States)	Ryan Hunter-Reay	American Spirit Team Johansson	1:10.408	1:09.359	1:09.359
13	(France)	Patrick Lemarié	PK Racing	1:11.026	1:09.736	1:09.736
14	(United States)	Jimmy Vasser	American Spirit Team Johansson	1:10.083	1:09.765	1:09.765
15	(Brazil)	Mario Haberfeld	Mi-Jack Conquest Racing	1:10.834	1:10.014	1:10.014
16	(Portugal)	Tiago Monteiro	Fittipaldi-Dingman Racing	1:10.459	1:10.092	1:10.092
17	(Mexico)	Rodolfo Lavín	Walker Racing	–	1:11.082	1:11.082
18	(Switzerland)	Joël Camathias	Dale Coyne Racing	1:12.281	1:11.303	1:11.303
19	(Malaysia)	Alex Yoong	Dale Coyne Racing	1:12.393	1:11.566	1:11.566

Rodolfo Lavín missed the first qualification session after a crashing during practice.

== Race ==
Pos	No	Driver	Team	Laps	Time/Retired	Grid	Points
1	3	(Canada) Paul Tracy	Team Player's	90	1:56:01.792	2	21
2	51	(Mexico) Adrian Fernández	Fernández Racing	90	+4.5 secs	7	16
3	1	(Brazil) Bruno Junqueira	Newman/Haas Racing	90	+13.7 secs	4	14
4	12	(United States) Jimmy Vasser	American Spirit Team Johansson	90	+21.0 secs	14	12
5	55	(Mexico) Mario Domínguez	Herdez Competition	90	+22.2 secs	11	10
6	32	(Canada) Patrick Carpentier	Team Player's	90	+22.7 secs	6	8
7	31	(United States) Ryan Hunter-Reay	American Spirit Team Johansson	90	+25.7 secs	12	6
8	15	(United Kingdom) Darren Manning	Walker Racing	90	+33.4 secs	10	5
9	34	(Brazil) Mario Haberfeld	Mi-Jack Conquest Racing	90	+48.6 secs	15	4
10	33	(Canada) Alex Tagliani	Rocketsports Racing	89	+ 1 Lap	3	3
11	7	(Portugal) Tiago Monteiro	Fittipaldi-Dingman Racing	88	+ 2 Laps	16	2
12	20	(Spain) Oriol Servià	Patrick Racing	87	Out of Fuel	8	1
13	27	(France) Patrick Lemarié	PK Racing	87	+ 3 Lap	13	0
14	19	(Switzerland) Joël Camathias	Dale Coyne Racing	84	+ 6 Laps	18	0
15	9	(Mexico) Michel Jourdain Jr.	Team Rahal	83	Gearbox	1	2
16	2	(France) Sébastien Bourdais	Newman/Haas Racing	70	Engine	5	0
17	4	(Brazil) Roberto Moreno	Herdez Competition	36	Collision	9	0
18	5	(Mexico) Rodolfo Lavín	Walker Racing	35	Collision	17	0
19	11	(Malaysia) Alex Yoong	Dale Coyne Racing	32	Accident	19	0

== Caution flags ==
Laps	Cause
28–30	Lemarié (27) stalled on course
33–35	Yoong (11) contact
37–40	Lavín (5) & Moreno (4) contact

== Lap leaders ==
Laps	Leader
1–26	Paul Tracy
27–56	Michel Jourdain Jr.
57–61	Oriol Servià
62	Adrian Fernández
63–65	Sébastien Bourdais
66–83	Michel Jourdain Jr.
84–90	Paul Tracy

Driver	Laps led
Michel Jourdain Jr.	48
Paul Tracy	33
Oriol Servià	5
Sébastien Bourdais	3
Adrian Fernández	1

- New Race Record Paul Tracy 1:56:01.792
- Average Speed 91.590 mph

Previous race: 2003 Tecate Telmex Monterrey Grand Prix	Champ Car World Series; 2003 season	Next race: 2003 London Champ Car Trophy
Previous race: 2002 Toyota Grand Prix of Long Beach	2003 Toyota Grand Prix of Long Beach	Next race: 2004 Toyota Grand Prix of Long Beach
