= 2003 U.S. Bank Cleveland Grand Prix =

Coordinates: 41°31′2.3″N 81°40′58.5″W

(United States) 2003 Cleveland
Race details
- Race 9 of 18 in the 2003 CART season
- Burke Lakefront Airport Track Layout
- Date: July 5, 2003
- Official name: 2003 U.S. Bank Presents the Cleveland Grand Prix
- Location: Burke Lakefront Airport; Cleveland, Ohio, United States
- Course: Temporary Airport Circuit; 2.106 mi / 3.389 km
- Distance: 115 laps 242.190 mi / 389.735 km
- Weather: Overcast with Scattered Thunderstorms in 30 miles far from race zone, luckily (Night Race)

Pole position
- Driver: (France) Sébastien Bourdais (Newman/Haas Racing)
- Time: 58.014

Fastest lap
- Driver: (France) Sébastien Bourdais (Newman/Haas Racing)
- Time: 58.949 (on lap 41 of 115)

Podium
- First: (France) Sébastien Bourdais (Newman/Haas Racing)
- Second: (Canada) Paul Tracy (Team Player's)
- Third: (Brazil) Bruno Junqueira (Newman/Haas Racing)

The 2003 U.S. Bank Cleveland Grand Prix was the ninth round of 18 of the 2003 CART World Series season, held on July 5, 2003 at Burke Lakefront Airport in Cleveland, Ohio. It was the first road course race to be held at night in CART history.

== Qualifying results ==
Pos	Nat	Name	Team	Qual 1	Qual 2	Best
1	(France)	Sébastien Bourdais	Newman/Haas Racing	59.163	58.014	58.014
2	(Canada)	Paul Tracy	Team Player's	58.405	1:01.294	58.405
3	(Canada)	Patrick Carpentier	Team Player's	58.868	58.449	58.449
4	(Spain)	Oriol Servià	Patrick Racing	59.186	58.502	58.502
5	(Brazil)	Bruno Junqueira	Newman/Haas Racing	59.804	58.506	58.506
6	(Mexico)	Michel Jourdain Jr.	Team Rahal	59.223	58.700	58.700
7	(Canada)	Alex Tagliani	Rocketsports Racing	59.247	58.718	58.718
8	(Mexico)	Mario Domínguez	Herdez Competition	59.535	58.724	58.724
9	(Brazil)	Roberto Moreno	Herdez Competition	59.954	58.845	58.845
10	(United States)	Jimmy Vasser	American Spirit Team Johansson	59.382	58.861	58.861
11	(United States)	Ryan Hunter-Reay	American Spirit Team Johansson	59.989	59.073	59.073
12	(Brazil)	Mario Haberfeld	Mi-Jack Conquest Racing	1:00.333	59.141	59.141
13	(United Kingdom)	Darren Manning	Walker Racing	59.776	59.167	59.167
14	(Mexico)	Adrian Fernández	Fernández Racing	59.340	59.306	59.306
15	(Mexico)	Rodolfo Lavín	Walker Racing	1:00.670	59.531	59.531
16	(Portugal)	Tiago Monteiro	Fittipaldi-Dingman Racing	1:00.003	59.822	59.822
17	(Brazil)	Gualter Salles	Dale Coyne Racing	1:01.778	59.968	59.968
18	(Italy)	Max Papis	PK Racing	1:00.020	1:00.080	1:00.020
19	(United States)	Geoff Boss	Dale Coyne Racing	1:01.103	1:01.525	1:01.103

== Race ==
Pos	No	Driver	Team	Laps	Time/Retired	Grid	Points
1	2	(France) Sébastien Bourdais	Newman/Haas Racing	115	2:03:51.974	1	21
2	3	(Canada) Paul Tracy	Team Player's	115	+2.2 secs	2	18
3	1	(Brazil) Bruno Junqueira	Newman/Haas Racing	115	+3.0 secs	5	14
4	32	(Canada) Patrick Carpentier	Team Player's	115	+7.8 secs	3	12
5	55	(Mexico) Mario Domínguez	Herdez Competition	115	+8.2 secs	8	10
6	20	(Spain) Oriol Servià	Patrick Racing	115	+9.9 secs	4	8
7	9	(Mexico) Michel Jourdain Jr.	Team Rahal	115	+10.5 secs	6	6
8	33	(Canada) Alex Tagliani	Rocketsports Racing	115	+13.0 secs	7	5
9	31	(United States) Ryan Hunter-Reay	American Spirit Team Johansson	115	+15.4 secs	11	4
10	15	(United Kingdom) Darren Manning	Walker Racing	115	+22.2 secs	13	3
11	51	(Mexico) Adrian Fernández	Fernández Racing	114	+ 1 Lap	14	2
12	27	(Italy) Max Papis	PK Racing	114	+ 1 Lap	17	1
13	12	(United States) Jimmy Vasser	American Spirit Team Johansson	113	+ 2 Laps	10	0
14	5	(Mexico) Rodolfo Lavín	Walker Racing	112	+ 3 Laps	15	0
15	34	(Brazil) Mario Haberfeld	Mi-Jack Conquest Racing	110	+ 5 Laps	12	0
16	11	(United States) Geoff Boss	Dale Coyne Racing	36	Mechanical	18	0
17	19	(Brazil) Gualter Salles	Dale Coyne Racing	18	Mechanical	16	0
18	4	(Brazil) Roberto Moreno	Herdez Competition	16	Contact	9	0
-	7	(Portugal) Tiago Monteiro	Fittipaldi-Dingman Racing	-	Withdrawn*	-	0

*Tiago Monteiro suffered a mild concussion after a pre-race practice crash and was not allowed to start by the CART medical officials.

== Caution flags ==
Laps	Cause
15-17	Vasser (12) & Moreno (4) contact
20-21	Salles (19) contact
57-59	Lavín (5) spin/stall
112-113	Vasser (12) spin/stall

== Notes ==
Laps	Leader
1-67	Paul Tracy
68-82	Jimmy Vasser
83-115	Sébastien Bourdais

Driver	Laps led
Paul Tracy	67
Sébastien Bourdais	33
Jimmy Vasser	15

- Average Speed 117.315 mph

Previous race: 2003 G.I. Joe's 200	Champ Car World Series; 2003 season	Next race: 2003 Molson Indy Toronto
Previous race: 2002 Marconi Grand Prix of Cleveland	2003 U.S. Bank Cleveland Grand Prix	Next race: 2004 U.S. Bank Champ Car Grand Prix of Cleveland
