= 2003 Molson Indy Toronto =

(Canada) 2003 Toronto
Race details
- Race 10 of 18 in the 2003 CART season
- Exhibition Place track layout
- Date: July 13, 2003
- Official name: 2003 Molson Indy Toronto
- Location: Exhibition Place; Toronto, Ontario, Canada
- Course: Temporary Street Circuit; 1.755 mi / 2.824 km
- Distance: 112 laps 196.560 mi / 316.288 km
- Weather: Clear

Pole position
- Driver: (Canada) Paul Tracy (Team Player's)
- Time: 58.839

Fastest lap
- Driver: (Canada) Paul Tracy (Team Player's)
- Time: 1:00.527 (on lap 11 of 112)

Podium
- First: (Canada) Paul Tracy (Team Player's)
- Second: (Mexico) Michel Jourdain Jr. (Team Rahal)
- Third: (Brazil) Bruno Junqueira (Newman/Haas Racing)

The 2003 Molson Indy Toronto was the tenth round of the 2003 CART World Series season, held on July 13, 2003 on the streets of Exhibition Place in Toronto, Ontario, Canada.

== Qualifying results ==
Pos	Nat	Name	Team	Qual 1	Qual 2	Best
1	(Canada)	Paul Tracy	Team Player's	59.803	58.839	58.839
2	(Brazil)	Bruno Junqueira	Newman/Haas Racing	59.486	59.332	59.332
3	(Mexico)	Michel Jourdain Jr.	Team Rahal	1:00.002	59.218	59.218
4	(Canada)	Alex Tagliani	Rocketsports Racing	1:00.221	59.261	59.261
5	(Canada)	Patrick Carpentier	Team Player's	1:00.438	59.364	59.364
6	(France)	Sébastien Bourdais	Newman/Haas Racing	1:00.674	59.421	59.421
7	(Brazil)	Roberto Moreno	Herdez Competition	1:00.627	59.870	59.870
8	(Spain)	Oriol Servià	Patrick Racing	1:00.009	59.875	59.875
9	(United States)	Jimmy Vasser	American Spirit Team Johansson	1:01.132	1:00.045	1:00.045
10	(Mexico)	Adrian Fernández	Fernández Racing	1:00.410	1:00.095	1:00.095
11	(United Kingdom)	Darren Manning	Walker Racing	1:00.586	1:00.283	1:00.283
12	(Mexico)	Mario Domínguez	Herdez Competition	1:01.242	1:00.487	1:00.487
13	(Portugal)	Tiago Monteiro	Fittipaldi-Dingman Racing	1:01.481	1:00.615	1:00.615
14	(United States)	Ryan Hunter-Reay	American Spirit Team Johansson	1:02.402	1:00.944	1:00.944
15	(Italy)	Max Papis	PK Racing	1:01.307	1:00.987	1:00.987
16	(Brazil)	Mario Haberfeld	Mi-Jack Conquest Racing	1:01.998	1:01.023	1:01.023
17	(Mexico)	Rodolfo Lavín	Walker Racing	1:02.035	1:01.555	1:01.555
18	(Brazil)	Alex Sperafico	Dale Coyne Racing	1:02.387	1:01.930	1:01.930
19	(United States)	Geoff Boss	Dale Coyne Racing	1:03.731	1:02.564	1:02.564

== Race ==
Pos	No	Driver	Team	Laps	Time/Retired	Grid	Points
1	3	(Canada) Paul Tracy	Team Player's	112	2:02:36.488	1	22
2	9	(Mexico) Michel Jourdain Jr.	Team Rahal	112	+4.5 secs	3	16
3	1	(Brazil) Bruno Junqueira	Newman/Haas Racing	112	+8.6 secs	2	15
4	2	(France) Sébastien Bourdais	Newman/Haas Racing	112	+10.7 secs	6	12
5	20	(Spain) Oriol Servià	Patrick Racing	112	+11.3 secs	8	10
6	4	(Brazil) Roberto Moreno	Herdez Competition	112	+14.3 secs	7	8
7	32	(Canada) Patrick Carpentier	Team Player's	112	+15.4 secs	5	6
8	15	(United Kingdom) Darren Manning	Walker Racing	112	+15.7 secs	11	5
9	51	(Mexico) Adrian Fernández	Fernández Racing	112	+1:01.0	10	4
10	7	(Portugal) Tiago Monteiro	Fittipaldi-Dingman Racing	110	+ 2 Laps	13	3
11	31	(United States) Ryan Hunter-Reay	American Spirit Team Johansson	110	+ 2 Laps	14	2
12	55	(Mexico) Mario Domínguez	Herdez Competition	109	+ 3 Laps	12	1
13	12	(United States) Jimmy Vasser	American Spirit Team Johansson	109	+ 3 Laps	9	0
14	11	(United States) Geoff Boss	Dale Coyne Racing	106	+ 6 Laps	19	0
15	5	(Mexico) Rodolfo Lavín	Walker Racing	105	+ 7 Laps	17	0
16	27	(Italy) Max Papis	PK Racing	36	Mechanical	15	0
17	33	(Canada) Alex Tagliani	Rocketsports Racing	28	Contact	4	0
18	19	(Brazil) Alex Sperafico	Dale Coyne Racing	5	Contact	18	0
19	34	(Brazil) Mario Haberfeld	Mi-Jack Conquest Racing	5	Contact	16	0

== Caution flags ==
Laps	Cause
1-3	Vasser (12) & Fernández (51) contact
6	Haberfeld (34) & Sperafico (19) contact
77-83	Vasser (12) & Domínguez (55) contact
84	Yellow restart

== Notes ==
Laps / Leader; 1-112 / Paul Tracy	Driver / Laps led; Paul Tracy / 112

- Average Speed 96.189 mph

Previous race: 2003 U.S. Bank Cleveland Grand Prix	Champ Car World Series; 2003 season	Next race: 2003 Molson Indy Vancouver
Previous race: 2002 Molson Indy Toronto	2003 Molson Indy Toronto	Next race: 2004 Molson Indy Toronto
