= 2003 Grand Prix Americas (Champ Car) =

(United States) 2003 Miami
Race details
- Race 16 of 18 in the 2003 CART season
- Date: September 28, 2003
- Official name: 2003 Grand Prix Americas Presented by Sportsbook.com
- Location: Bayfront Park; Miami, Florida, United States
- Course: Temporary Street Course; 1.150 mi / 1.851 km
- Distance: 135 laps 155.250 mi / 249.885 km
- Weather: Mostly cloudy with temperatures reaching up to 90 °F (32 °C); wind speeds approaching 11.1 miles per hour (17.9 km/h)

Pole position
- Driver: (Mexico) Adrian Fernández (Fernández Racing)
- Time: 44.253

Fastest lap
- Driver: (Mexico) Adrian Fernández (Fernández Racing)
- Time: 45.010 (on lap 89 of 135)

Podium
- First: (Mexico) Mario Domínguez (Herdez Competition)
- Second: (Brazil) Roberto Moreno (Herdez Competition)
- Third: (Finland) Mika Salo (PK Racing)

The 2003 Grand Prix Americas was the sixteenth round of the 2003 CART World Series season, held on September 28, 2003, on the streets of downtown Miami, Florida.

== Qualifying results ==
Pos	Nat	Name	Team	Qual 1	Qual 2	Best
1	(Mexico)	Adrian Fernández	Fernández Racing	46.306	44.253	44.253
2	(Brazil)	Bruno Junqueira	Newman/Haas Racing	45.024	45.639	45.024
3	(Spain)	Oriol Servià	Patrick Racing	46.319	44.289	44.289
4	(France)	Sébastien Bourdais	Newman/Haas Racing	45.770	44.609	44.609
5	(Canada)	Paul Tracy	Team Player's	47.401	44.768	44.768
6	(Mexico)	Michel Jourdain Jr.	Team Rahal	46.033	44.939	44.939
7	(Brazil)	Roberto Moreno	Herdez Competition	46.773	45.140	45.140
8	(Mexico)	Mario Domínguez	Herdez Competition	46.379	45.157	45.157
9	(Portugal)	Tiago Monteiro	Fittipaldi-Dingman Racing	47.845	45.318	45.318
10	(Canada)	Alex Tagliani	Rocketsports Racing	46.328	45.372	45.372
11	(United States)	Jimmy Vasser	American Spirit Team Johansson	46.530	45.380	45.380
12	(United Kingdom)	Darren Manning	Walker Racing	47.119	45.430	45.430
13	(Brazil)	Mario Haberfeld	Mi-Jack Conquest Racing	51.950	45.441	45.441
14	(United States)	Ryan Hunter-Reay	American Spirit Team Johansson	46.470	45.652	45.652
15	(Finland)	Mika Salo	PK Racing	45.686	45.731	45.686
16	(Mexico)	Rodolfo Lavín	Walker Racing	48.398	46.319	46.319
17	(United States)	Geoff Boss	Dale Coyne Racing	48.765	46.446	46.446
18	(Canada)	Patrick Carpentier	Team Player's	46.765	49.267	46.765
19	(Brazil)	Alex Sperafico	Dale Coyne Racing	48.871	-	48.871

== Race ==
Pos	No	Driver	Team	Laps	Time/Retired	Grid	Points
1	55	(Mexico) Mario Domínguez	Herdez Competition	135	2:03:19.401	8	20
2	4	(Brazil) Roberto Moreno	Herdez Competition	135	+5.241 secs	7	16
3	27	(Finland) Mika Salo	PK Racing	135	+7.988 secs	15	14
4	12	(United States) Jimmy Vasser	American Spirit Team Johansson	135	+9.208 secs	11	12
5	34	(Brazil) Mario Haberfeld	Mi-Jack Conquest Racing	135	+9.483 secs	13	10
6	32	(Canada) Patrick Carpentier	Team Player's	135	+10.257 secs	18	8
7	9	(Mexico) Michel Jourdain Jr.	Team Rahal	135	+19.174 secs	6	6
8	51	(Mexico) Adrian Fernández	Fernández Racing	134	+ 1 Lap	1	7
9	1	(Brazil) Bruno Junqueira	Newman/Haas Racing	131	+ 4 Laps	2	5
10	11	(United States) Geoff Boss	Dale Coyne Racing	129	+ 6 Laps	17	3
11	15	(United Kingdom) Darren Manning	Walker Racing	123	Mechanical	12	2
12	31	(United States) Ryan Hunter-Reay	American Spirit Team Johansson	114	Contact	14	1
13	33	(Canada) Alex Tagliani	Rocketsports Racing	101	Contact	10	0
14	19	(Brazil) Alex Sperafico	Dale Coyne Racing	98	Contact	19	0
15	7	(Portugal) Tiago Monteiro	Fittipaldi-Dingman Racing	91	Contact	9	0
16	3	(Canada) Paul Tracy	Team Player's	69	Contact	5	0
17	2	(France) Sébastien Bourdais	Newman/Haas Racing	69	Contact	4	0
18	5	(Mexico) Rodolfo Lavín	Walker Racing	56	Contact	16	0
19	20	(Spain) Oriol Servià	Patrick Racing	43	Contact	3	0

== Caution flags ==
Laps	Cause
39-43	Boss (11) stopped on course
44-52	Servià (20) contact
68-72	Tracy (3) & Bourdais (2) contact
93-99	Junqueira (1), Fernández (51) & Monteiro (7) contact
100-105	Sperafico (19) contact
118-121	Hunter-Reay (31) contact

== Notes ==
Laps	Leader
1	Bruno Junqueira
2-89	Adrian Fernández
90-95	Mika Salo
96-103	Michel Jourdain Jr.
104-107	Darren Manning
108-135	Mario Domínguez

Driver	Laps led
Adrian Fernández	88
Mario Domínguez	28
Michel Jourdain Jr.	8
Mika Salo	6
Darren Manning	4
Bruno Junqueira	1

- New Track Record Adrian Fernández 44.253 (Qualification Session #2)
- New Race Record Mario Domínguez 2:03:19.401
- Average Speed 75.533 mph

Previous race: 2003 Centrix Financial Grand Prix of Denver	Champ Car World Series; 2003 season	Next race: 2003 Gran Premio Telmex-Gigante
Previous race: 2002 Grand Prix Americas	2003 Grand Prix Americas	Next race: Final Event
