= 2003 Molson Indy Montreal =

(Canada) 2003 Montreal
Race details
- Race 14 of 18 in the 2003 CART season
- Circuit Gilles Villeneuve Track Layout
- Date: August 24, 2003
- Official name: 2003 Molson Indy Montreal
- Location: Circuit Gilles Villeneuve; Montreal, Quebec, Canada
- Course: Permanent Road Course; 2.709 mi / 4.360 km
- Distance: 75 laps 203.175 mi / 327.000 km
- Weather: Partly Cloudy

Pole position
- Driver: (Canada) Alex Tagliani (Rocketsports Racing)
- Time: 1:19.665

Fastest lap
- Driver: (Brazil) Bruno Junqueira (Newman/Haas Racing)
- Time: 1:20.634 (on lap 69 of 75)

Podium
- First: (Mexico) Michel Jourdain Jr. (Team Rahal)
- Second: (Spain) Oriol Servià (Patrick Racing)
- Third: (Canada) Patrick Carpentier (Team Player's)

The 2003 Molson Indy Montreal was the fourteenth round of the 2003 CART World Series season, held on August 24, 2003 at the Circuit Gilles Villeneuve in Montreal, Quebec, Canada. Michel Jourdain, Jr won his 2nd and final Champ Car victory.

This marks the Final Champ Car race for Max Papis

== Qualifying results ==
Pos	Nat	Name	Team	Qual 1	Qual 2	Best
1	(Canada)	Alex Tagliani	Rocketsports Racing	1:21.542	1:19.665	1:19.665
2	(Spain)	Oriol Servià	Patrick Racing	1:21.112	1:19.757	1:19.757
3	(Brazil)	Bruno Junqueira	Newman/Haas Racing	1:21.476	1:19.671	1:19.671
4	(Mexico)	Michel Jourdain Jr.	Team Rahal	1:22.095	1:19.751	1:19.751
5	(Canada)	Patrick Carpentier	Team Player's	-	1:19.810	1:19.810
6	(France)	Sébastien Bourdais	Newman/Haas Racing	1:21.495	1:19.818	1:19.818
7	(United States)	Jimmy Vasser	American Spirit Team Johansson	1:22.171	1:19.882	1:19.882
8	(Canada)	Paul Tracy	Team Player's	1:21.405	1:20.015	1:20.015
9	(United Kingdom)	Darren Manning	Walker Racing	1:21.833	1:20.308	1:20.308
10	(Mexico)	Mario Domínguez	Herdez Competition	1:22.125	1:20.360	1:20.360
11	(Portugal)	Tiago Monteiro	Fittipaldi-Dingman Racing	1:22.069	1:20.360	1:20.360
12	(Brazil)	Mario Haberfeld	Mi-Jack Conquest Racing	1:22.589	1:20.639	1:20.639
13	(Brazil)	Roberto Moreno	Herdez Competition	1:22.918	1:20.826	1:20.826
14	(United States)	Ryan Hunter-Reay	American Spirit Team Johansson	1:21.846	1:20.963	1:20.963
15	(Italy)	Max Papis	PK Racing	1:23.093	1:21.116	1:21.116
16	(Mexico)	Adrian Fernández	Fernández Racing	1:22.354	1:21.237	1:21.237
17	(Brazil)	Gualter Salles	Dale Coyne Racing	1:23.074	1:21.497	1:21.497
18	(Mexico)	Rodolfo Lavín	Walker Racing	1:23.337	1:21.718	1:21.718
19	(United States)	Geoff Boss	Dale Coyne Racing	1:23.865	1:22.177	1:22.177

== Race ==
Pos	No	Driver	Team	Laps	Time/Retired	Grid	Points
1	9	(Mexico) Michel Jourdain Jr.	Team Rahal	75	1:54:23.210	4	20
2	20	(Spain) Oriol Servià	Patrick Racing	75	+1.277 secs	2	17
3	32	(Canada) Patrick Carpentier	Team Player's	75	+2.099 secs	5	14
4	33	(Canada) Alex Tagliani	Rocketsports Racing	75	+7.219 secs	1	14
5	55	(Mexico) Mario Domínguez	Herdez Competition	75	+10.010 secs	10	10
6	3	(Canada) Paul Tracy	Team Player's	75	+14.911 secs	8	8
7	4	(Brazil) Roberto Moreno	Herdez Competition	75	+16.833 secs	13	6
8	51	(Mexico) Adrian Fernández	Fernández Racing	75	+37.195 secs	16	5
9	27	(Italy) Max Papis	PK Racing	75	+37.543 secs	15	4
10	15	(United Kingdom) Darren Manning	Walker Racing	75	+38.417 secs	9	3
11	34	(Brazil) Mario Haberfeld	Mi-Jack Conquest Racing	75	+38.827 secs	12	2
12	19	(Brazil) Gualter Salles	Dale Coyne Racing	75	+50.546 secs	17	1
13	1	(Brazil) Bruno Junqueira	Newman/Haas Racing	74	+ 1 Lap	3	0
14	11	(United States) Geoff Boss	Dale Coyne Racing	74	+ 1 Lap	19	0
15	5	(Mexico) Rodolfo Lavín	Walker Racing	74	+ 1 Lap	18	0
16	12	(United States) Jimmy Vasser	American Spirit Team Johansson	72	Mechanical	7	0
17	31	(United States) Ryan Hunter-Reay	American Spirit Team Johansson	60	Mechanical	14	0
18	7	(Portugal) Tiago Monteiro	Fittipaldi-Dingman Racing	49	Contact	11	0
19	2	(France) Sébastien Bourdais	Newman/Haas Racing	28	Mechanical	6	0

== Caution flags ==
Laps	Cause
7-9	Hunter-Reay (31) spin/stall
45-47	Junqueira (1) spin/stall
50-51	Monteiro (7) & Hunter-Reay (31) contact

== Notes ==
Laps	Leader
1-18	Alex Tagliani
19-20	Oriol Servià
21-37	Alex Tagliani
38-40	Michel Jourdain Jr.
41-57	Alex Tagliani
58-59	Michel Jourdain Jr.
60-65	Roberto Moreno
66-75	Michel Jourdain Jr.

Driver	Laps led
Alex Tagliani	52
Michel Jourdain Jr.	15
Roberto Moreno	6
Oriol Servià	2

- New Race Record Michel Jourdain Jr. 1:54:23.210
- Average Speed 106.573 mph

Previous race: 2003 Champ Car Grand Prix of Mid-Ohio	Champ Car World Series; 2003 season	Next race: 2003 Centrix Financial Grand Prix of Denver
Previous race: 2002 Molson Indy Montreal	2003 Molson Indy Montreal	Next race: 2004 Molson Indy Montreal
