= 2003 Mario Andretti Grand Prix at Road America =

(United States) 2003 Road America
Race details
- Race 12 of 18 in the 2003 CART season
- Road America Track Layout
- Date: August 3, 2003
- Official name: 2003 Mario Andretti Grand Prix at Road America Presented by Briggs & Stratton
- Location: Road America, Elkhart Lake, Wisconsin, United States
- Course: Permanent Road Course; 4.048 mi / 6.515 km
- Distance: 34 laps 137.632 mi / 221.510 km
- Weather: Cool and wet with scattered thunderstorms (Rain shortened, race scheduled for 60 laps)

Pole position
- Driver: (Brazil) Bruno Junqueira (Newman/Haas Racing)
- Time: 1:43.703

Fastest lap
- Driver: (France) Sébastien Bourdais (Newman/Haas Racing)
- Time: 1:58.187 (on lap 33 of 34)

Podium
- First: (Brazil) Bruno Junqueira (Newman/Haas Racing)
- Second: (France) Sébastien Bourdais (Newman/Haas Racing)
- Third: (Canada) Alex Tagliani (Rocketsports Racing)

The 2003 Mario Andretti Grand Prix at Road America Presented by Briggs & Stratton was the twelfth round of the 2003 CART World Series season, held on August 3, 2003 at the Road America circuit in Elkhart Lake, Wisconsin.

The race was shortened to 34 laps from the scheduled 60 after the race was red-flagged twice because of rain. The first stoppage lasted 20 minutes after only 1 lap and the second lasted 2 hours and 40 minutes after lap 7. With darkness impending at the restart after the second red flag period, the race had to be shortened from its original length.

== Race cancellation and rescheduling ==
This race was canceled in March 2003 (along with the planned race for 2004) after a legal dispute developed between the Road America's owner George Bruggenthies and CART. However, Mario Andretti was able to negotiate an agreement between the parties and the race was restored to CART's schedule in April. The race was then named in Andretti's honor.

== Qualifying results ==
Pos	Nat	Name	Team	Qual 1	Qual 2	Best
1	(Brazil)	Bruno Junqueira	Newman/Haas Racing	1:43.917	1:43.703	1:43.703
2	(France)	Sébastien Bourdais	Newman/Haas Racing	1:44.722	1:44.242	1:44.242
3	(Canada)	Patrick Carpentier	Team Player's	1:44.814	1:44.306	1:44.306
4	(Spain)	Oriol Servià	Patrick Racing	1:45.654	1:44.314	1:44.314
5	(Mexico)	Mario Domínguez	Herdez Competition	1:45.682	1:44.378	1:44.378
6	(Canada)	Paul Tracy	Team Player's	1:44.725	1:44.519	1:44.519
7	(United States)	Jimmy Vasser	American Spirit Team Johansson	1:45.098	1:44.545	1:44.545
8	(United States)	Ryan Hunter-Reay	American Spirit Team Johansson	1:45.442	1:44.551	1:44.551
9	(Mexico)	Adrian Fernández	Fernández Racing	1:44.735	1:44.620	1:44.620
10	(Mexico)	Michel Jourdain Jr.	Team Rahal	1:45.188	1:44.752	1:44.752
11	(Portugal)	Tiago Monteiro	Fittipaldi-Dingman Racing	1:45.715	1:44.778	1:44.778
12	(Brazil)	Roberto Moreno	Herdez Competition	-	1:45.021	1:45.021
13	(Canada)	Alex Tagliani	Rocketsports Racing	-	1:45.044	1:45.044
14	(United Kingdom)	Darren Manning	Walker Racing	1:45.076	1:45.583	1:45.076
15	(Brazil)	Mario Haberfeld	Mi-Jack Conquest Racing	-	1:45.173	1:45.173
16	(Italy)	Max Papis	PK Racing	1:46.681	1:45.728	1:45.728
17	(Mexico)	Rodolfo Lavín	Walker Racing	1:46.013	1:46.847	1:46.013
18	(Brazil)	Gualter Salles	Dale Coyne Racing	1:47.418	1:47.003	1:47.003
19	(United States)	Geoff Boss	Dale Coyne Racing	1:48.727	1:47.446	1:47.446

== Race ==
Pos	No	Driver	Team	Laps	Time/Retired	Grid	Points
1	1	(Brazil) Bruno Junqueira	Newman/Haas Racing	34	1:35:28.491	1	23
2	2	(France) Sébastien Bourdais	Newman/Haas Racing	34	+0.703 secs	2	16
3	33	(Canada) Alex Tagliani	Rocketsports Racing	34	+10.883 secs	13	14
4	27	(Italy) Max Papis	PK Racing	34	+14.943 secs	16	12
5	32	(Canada) Patrick Carpentier	Team Player's	34	+19.494 secs	3	10
6	15	(United Kingdom) Darren Manning	Walker Racing	34	+19.592 secs	14	8
7	4	(Brazil) Roberto Moreno	Herdez Competition	34	+21.298 secs	12	6
8	34	(Brazil) Mario Haberfeld	Mi-Jack Conquest Racing	34	+31.541 secs	15	5
9	12	(United States) Jimmy Vasser	American Spirit Team Johansson	34	+34.982 secs	7	4
10	31	(United States) Ryan Hunter-Reay	American Spirit Team Johansson	34	+41.025 secs	8	3
11	19	(Brazil) Gualter Salles	Dale Coyne Racing	34	+45.278 secs	18	2
12	51	(Mexico) Adrian Fernández	Fernández Racing	34	+59.576 secs	9	1
13	11	(United States) Geoff Boss	Dale Coyne Racing	34	+1:35.018	19	0
14	55	(Mexico) Mario Domínguez	Herdez Competition	18	Off course	5	0
15	3	(Canada) Paul Tracy	Team Player's	10	Contact	6	0
16	9	(Mexico) Michel Jourdain Jr.	Team Rahal	10	Contact	10	0
17	7	(Portugal) Tiago Monteiro	Fittipaldi-Dingman Racing	10	Contact	11	0
18	20	(Spain) Oriol Servià	Patrick Racing	7	Contact	4	0
19	5	(Mexico) Rodolfo Lavín	Walker Racing	0	Contact	17	0

== Caution flags ==
Laps	Cause
1	Yellow start
2-7	Yellow restart after red flag (20:44)
8-9	Yellow restart after red flag (2:40:56)
11-13	Tracy (3) contact; Jourdain Jr. (9), Monteiro (7), Manning (15) & Moreno (4) contact
19-21	Domínguez (55) spun off course

== Notes ==
Laps / Leader; 1-34 / Bruno Junqueira	Driver / Laps led; Bruno Junqueira / 34

- Average Speed 86.493 mph

Previous race: 2003 Molson Indy Vancouver	Champ Car World Series; 2003 season	Next race: 2003 Champ Car Grand Prix of Mid-Ohio
Previous race: 2002 Grand Prix at Road America	2003 Mario Andretti Grand Prix at Road America	Next race: 2004 Grand Prix of Road America
