= Adrián Fernández =

Mexican professional racing driver and team owner

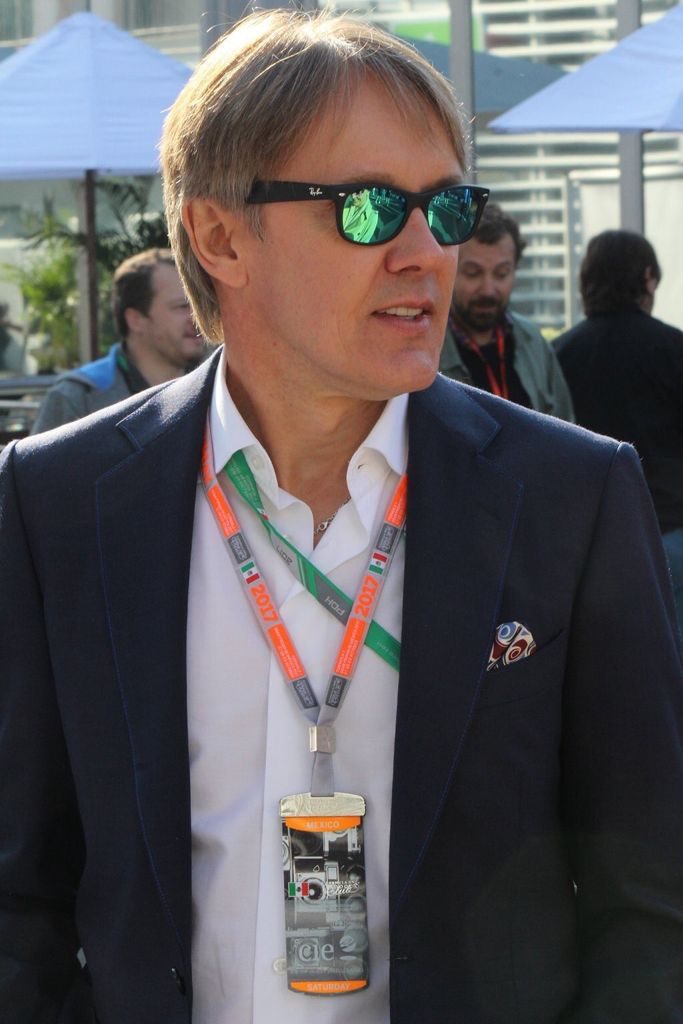
- Fernández at Autódromo Hermanos Rodríguez, Mexico City
- Born: April 20, 1963 (age 63) Mexico City, Mexico

Previous series
- 1981–1983, 1984–1986, 1987–1989, 1990–1991, 1992, 1993–2003, 2004–2005, 2006, 2007–2011: Mexican Touring Car Racing, Formula Vee, Formula K, Benelux Formula Ford, British Formula Ford, Mexican Formula Three, Indy Lights, CART World Series, IndyCar Series, Rolex Sports Car Series, American Le Mans Series, Le Mans Series, Intercontinental Le Mans Cup

Championship titles
- 1983, 1991, 2009: Mexican Formula Vee Champion, Mexican Formula Three Champion, American Le Mans Series LMP2 Class Champion

24 Hours of Le Mans career
- Years: 2007, 2010–2012
- Teams: Barazi-Epsilon, Aston Martin Racing
- Best finish: 2nd (2007)

NASCAR O'Reilly Auto Parts Series career
- 10 races run over 4 years
- Best finish: 74th (2005)
- First race: 2005 Telcel Motorola 200 (Mexico City)
- Last race: 2008 Corona Mexico 200 (Mexico City)
Wins	Top tens	Poles
	2

Adrián Fernández Mier (born April 20, 1963) is a Mexican former professional race car driver and co-owner of the Fernandez Racing team.

== Racing career ==
=== Early career ===
Fernández was born in Mexico City and began his career in Mexico at the age of eight. He entered his first auto race in 1981 at the "24 Hours of Mexico" race in Mexico City. At the age of fifteen, he made the permanent transition to cars in 1982. From 1982 to 1984, Fernández competed in the Formula Vee Championship, winning the title in both 1983 and 1984. He also raced in the Formula K Series in 1984, continuing in that series until 1986, and finished in the top four in the standings all three years in Formula K.

In 1987, Fernández participated in the Benelux Formula Ford 1600 Championship, one race in the British RAC Formula Ford 1600 Championship, and competed in the Formula Ford Festival at Brands Hatch. From 1988 to 1989, he took part in the British RAC and Esso Formula Ford 1600 Championship series before moving to the Mexican F3 Championship in 1990 and 1991, winning the title in 1991.

In 1992, Fernández moved to the United States to compete in the Firestone Indy Lights Championship, now known as Indy NXT. He finished third in points, winning four races, a rookie record, setting a rookie record, and earned the honors of "Indy Lights Rookie of the Year," along with accumulating more than two million dollars in prize earnings.

=== CART, IROC, and IRL (1993–2004) ===
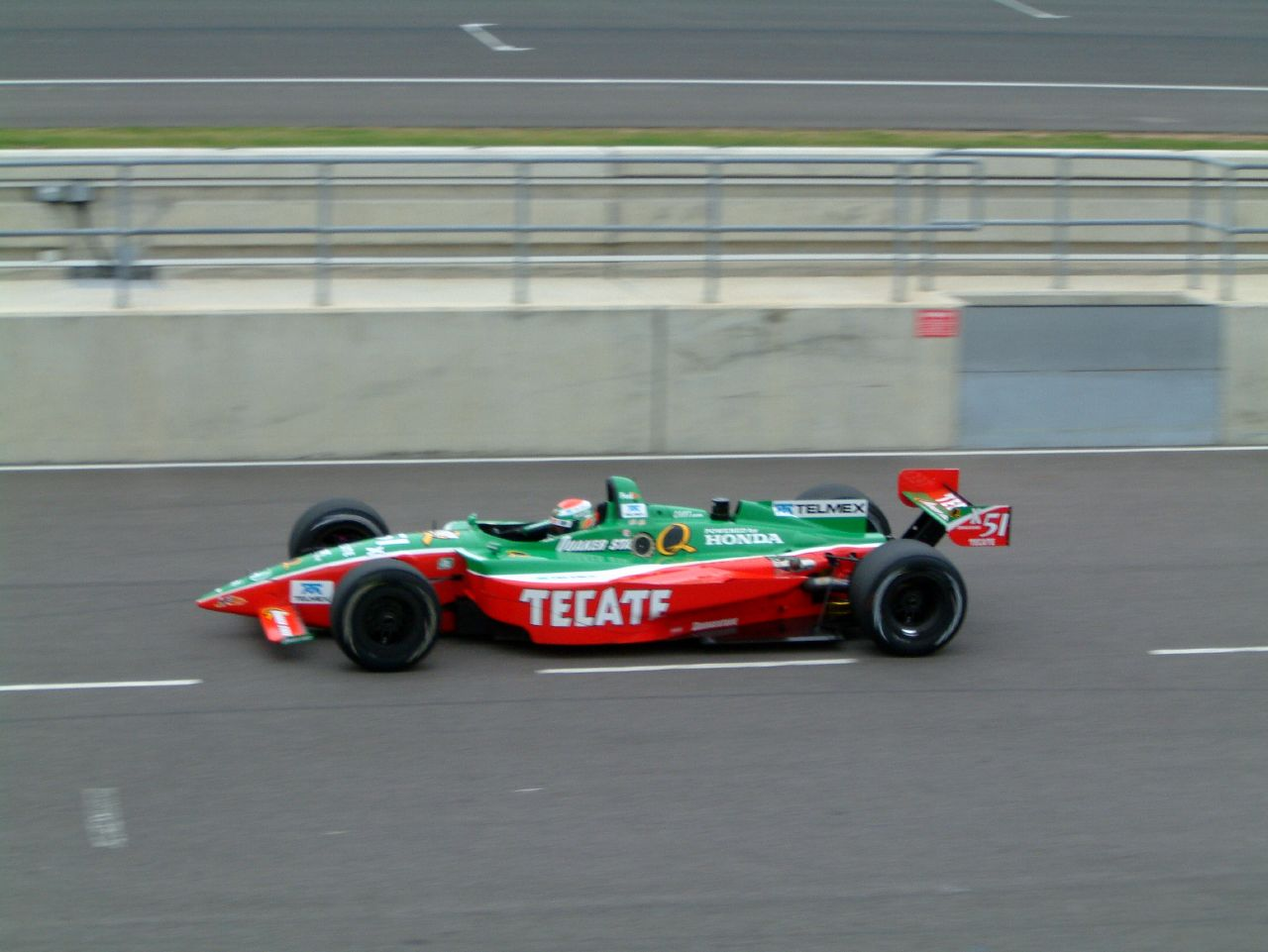
Fernández competing at Rockingham Motor Speedway in 2002.

In 1993, Fernández made the jump to the CART IndyCar World Series, competing in five races for Galles Racing International. He participated in his first full season in 1994, with Galles finishing 13th and capturing the "Marco Magaña" and "Luchador Olmeca" awards along with the "JAC" trophy for "Best Driver" outside Mexico. Competing again with Galles in 1995, Fernández finished twelfth in the standings, placing with nine top-ten finishes.

Fernández moved to Tasman Motorsports in 1996. He had six top-ten finishes, including his first career CART victory at Toronto. Unfortunately, his delight at taking his first win was dampened by the fatal accident suffered by Jeff Krosnoff late in the race. The win in Toronto made him the first Mexican to win a CART event since Héctor Rebaque in 1982. Fernández went on to finish twelfth in the season's points tally. 1997 was a disappointing season for Fernández. The Tasman team ran a Lola chassis, which failed to perform to expectations. Through force of will, determination, and talent, Fernández battled to three top-ten finishes and 18th place in the PPG Cup standings.

Fernández joined Patrick Racing for the 1998 season and proved his ability to challenge for the championship. He enjoyed 14 top-ten finishes with eight top-five placements and two victories, Japan and Mid-Ohio, en route to a fourth place showing in the PPG Cup race during the 1998 FedEx Championship. He captured his first career pole at Michigan and led the championship race for the first time in his career. Unfortunately, Fernández was once again touched by tragedy — a crash at Michigan resulted in an errant wheel from his car flying into the stands and killing three spectators. However, it was his victory during the Miller Lite 200 that gave Patrick Racing one of its most memorable moments, when Fernández stood atop the podium next to his teammate Scott Pruett. Fernández was also named the "Athlete of the Year" in Mexico.

In 1999, Fernandez enjoyed his most successful season so far in the series. Fernández, behind the wheel of the No. 40 Tecate/Quaker State Reynard Ford-Cosworth, completed the year sixth in the championship battle. He led the points' series early in the season for the first time in his CART career. However, an accident at Belle Isle Park resulted in a fracture in one of his hands, forcing him to sit out for several races. Undeterred, he later won at Motegi, Japan at the Firestone Firehawk 500 and at the Marlboro 500 in Fontana, California — a race marred by the death of good friend Greg Moore.

Later in 1999, Fernández was selected to participate in the IROC series, where he competed against many top-tier drivers, including NASCAR drivers Jeff Gordon, Terry Labonte, and Dale Earnhardt. Fernández had 80 total starts in the series. Of those starts, he finished in the top-ten 41 times throughout his seven-year career.

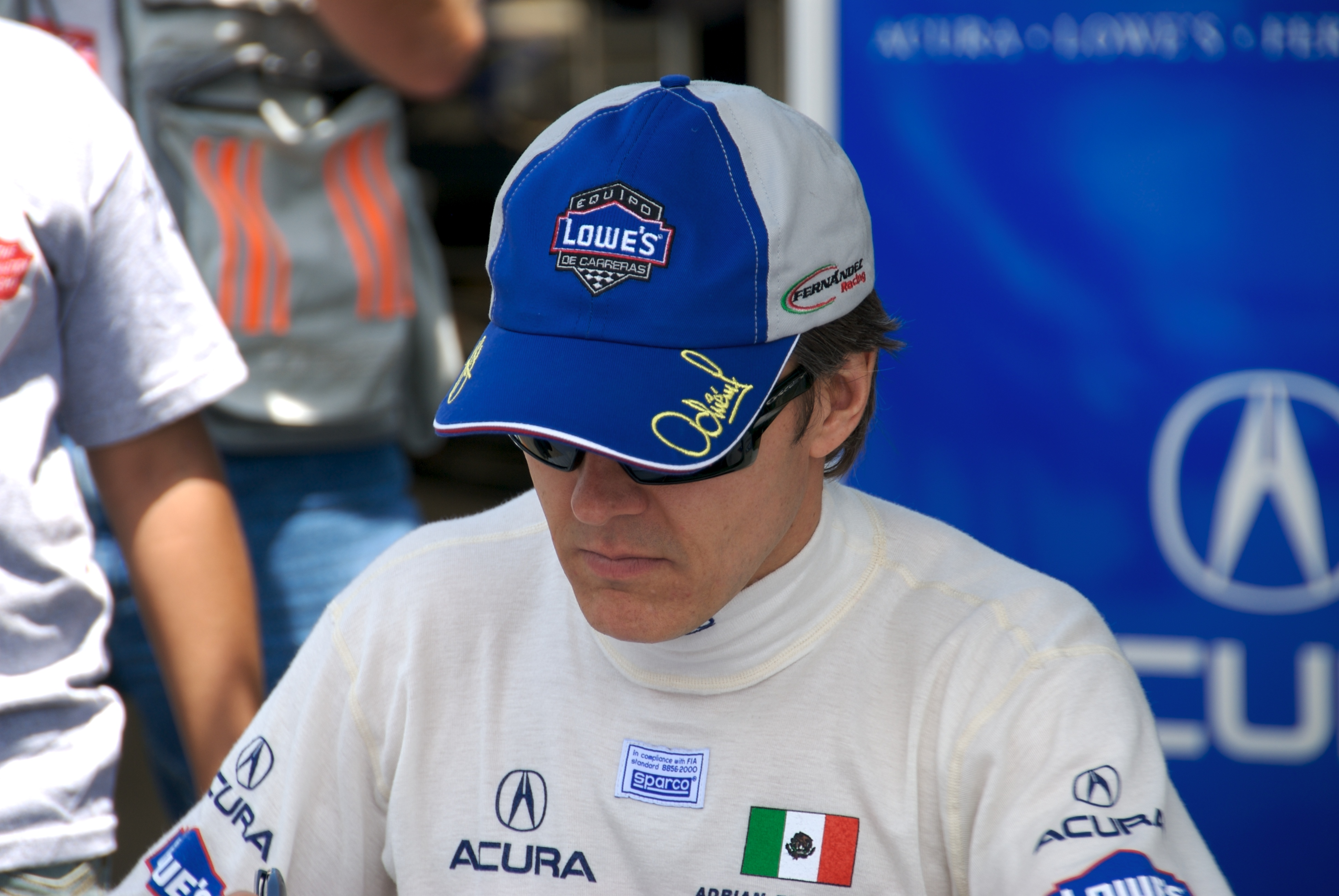
Adrián Fernández

In 2000, Fernández had his best season in the CART series, coming close to winning the championship despite not starting on the front row all season. He scored points in seventeen of the twenty races, including two wins at Rio de Janeiro, Brazil and Australia, and three further podium results. He finished second to Gil de Ferran in the championship.

In 2001, Fernández founded his own team, Fernandez Racing, with former Ganassi manager Tom Anderson as his partner and ex-F1 driver Shinji Nakano as his teammate. He finished third twice and took two poles that year, but his team's first victory came at Portland in 2003, the first win for an owner-driver since Bobby Rahal achieved the feat in 1992. That year, he also ran an Indy Racing League (IRL) entry for Asian-American Roger Yasukawa, in partnership with Aguri Suzuki, and in 2004, he moved the whole team to the series. Despite taking three wins and finishing fourth overall in the 2004 IRL championship, he was unable to secure funding to race in 2005. Delphi was driver Scott Sharp's personal sponsor, while engine suppliers Honda insisted on Japanese driver Kosuke Matsuura in the second car.

=== Busch Series (2005–06) ===
In 2005, Fernández drove the No. 5 Lowe's / Hitachi Chevrolet in Mexico for Hendrick Motorsports in the first NASCAR Busch Series race held outside the United States. In this race (called the Telcel-Motorola 200), Fernández raced in a one-time race to help promote NASCAR racing to the local fans. He led several laps in the race before giving up the lead to eventual race winner Martin Truex Jr. It was announced that he would run four more races in the Busch Series for Hendrick Motorsports, but he did not run up front at any of those races. In 2006, he competed in two Busch races for Hendrick and competed full time in the Grand-Am series for his own team with Lowe's sponsorship.

=== ALMS (2007–present) ===
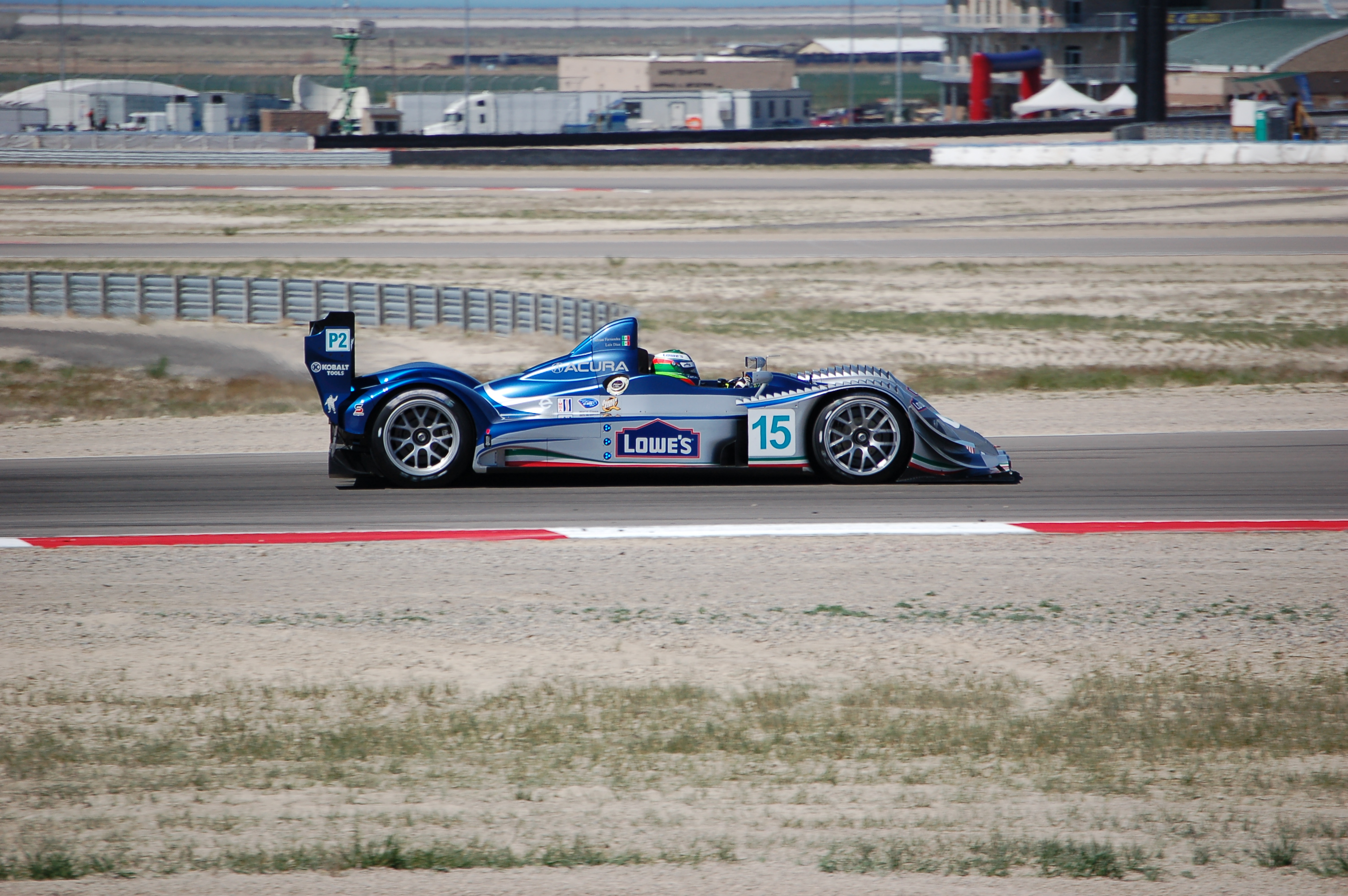
Adrián Fernández in the Acura ARX-01B in 2008

In 2007, Fernández moved to American Le Mans Series LMP2 class as an Acura factory team. His teammate was fellow Mexican and Grand-Am veteran Luis Díaz.

On October 10, 2009, Fernández and his co-driver Luis Díaz won at the Mazda Raceway Laguna Seca in Monterey, California. With this victory, the Lowe's Fernandez Racing Acura ARX-01B concludes the season with the drivers' championship and teams' championship of the American Le Mans Series in the LMP2 category.

=== 24 Hours of Le Mans ===
In 2007, Fernández made his debut with a second place in the LMP2 category in the famous race with the Barazi-Epsilon team Zytek aboard a 07S/2 3.4-liter V8 prototype. His teammates were Haruki Kurosawa and Robbie Kerr. This was the first podium for a Mexican at the Circuit de la Sarthe in many years, to remember those achieved by Ricardo and Pedro Rodríguez in 1962 and 1968 respectively. The English-French team took pole position on its category.

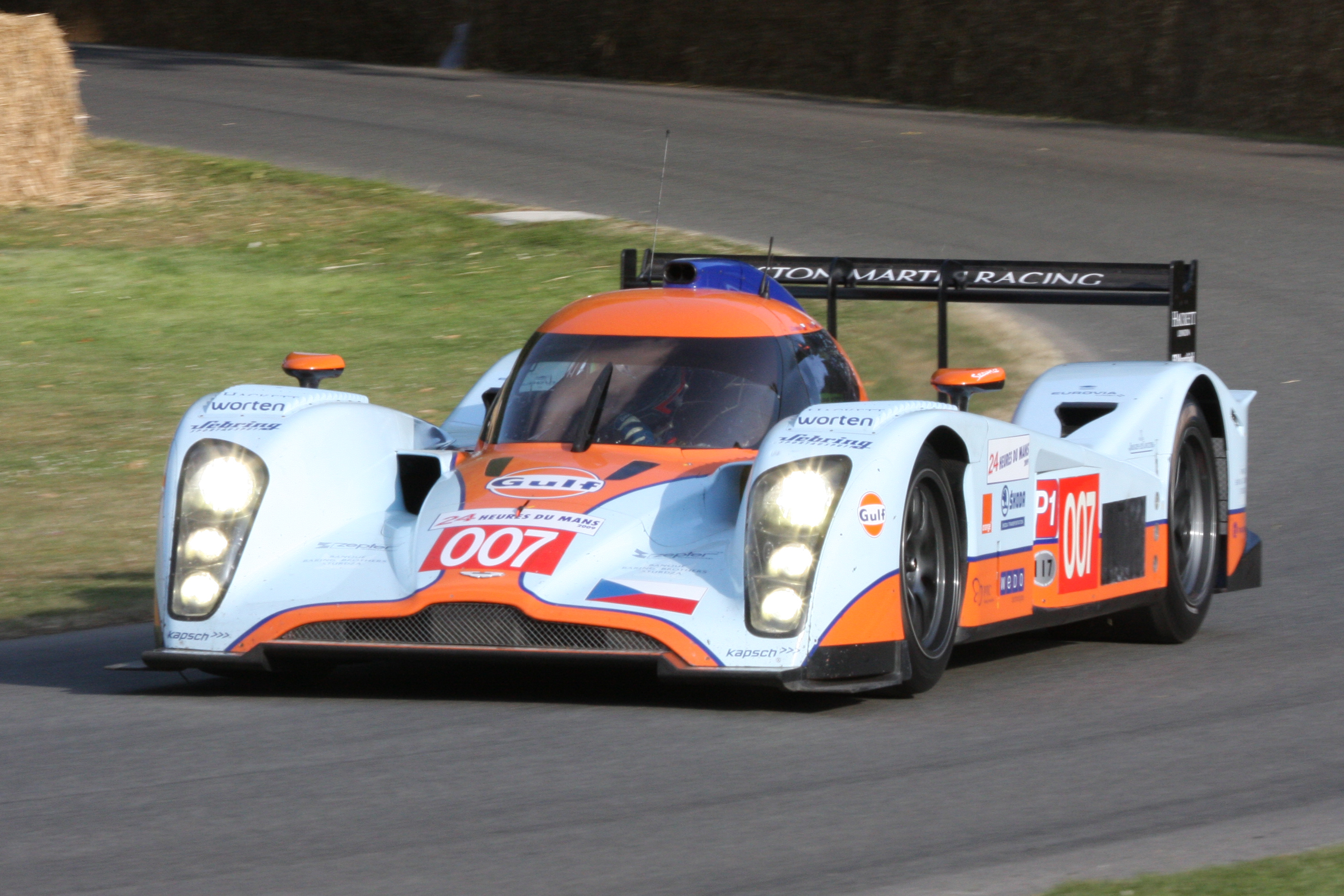
The Lola-Aston Martin B09/60

After three years of absence, Fernández competed in 2010, this time in LMP1 class with Aston Martin Racing. He finished fifth in his category (sixth absolute) with a Lola-Aston Martin B09/60 with co-drivers Harold Primat and Stefan Mücke.

The luck did not favor Fernández in 2011, when his team, the Aston Martin Racing in LMP1 class, could barely afford two laps with their Aston Martin AMR-One and leave the test due to problems with the engine running at the 56th site.

In the 80th edition of 2012, Fernández and the Aston Martin Racing Team got third place in the GTE-Pro class, along with his co-drivers Stefan Mücke and Darren Turner, Their Aston Martin Vantage 4.5 L-V8 covered a total of 332 laps (2,811.65 miles), on the Circuit de la Sarthe without failure or serious mechanical problems. Also, the team achieved the fastest lap of the category with 3 minutes and 54,928 seconds. Fernández had the honor to drive the last stage of the competition.

On September 12, 2012, Fernández announced that his participation in the FIA World Endurance Championship would conclude at the end of the season, as well his relationship with the Aston Martin Racing team that started in 2010. He would focus on competitions in the United States.

=== Sergio Pérez's manager ===
On September 28, 2012, Formula One driver Sergio Pérez announced that Fernández would be his manager.

=== Turn 12 Adrián Fernández ===
In September 2016, Autodromo Hermanos Rodriguez honored Fernández when they named Turn 12 of the circuit after him.

== BRM P153 ==
In 2024, Fernández acquired the legendary BRM P153/05 from a private collector. This Formula One car won the 1970 Belgian Grand Prix under the command of Mexican idol Pedro Rodríguez.

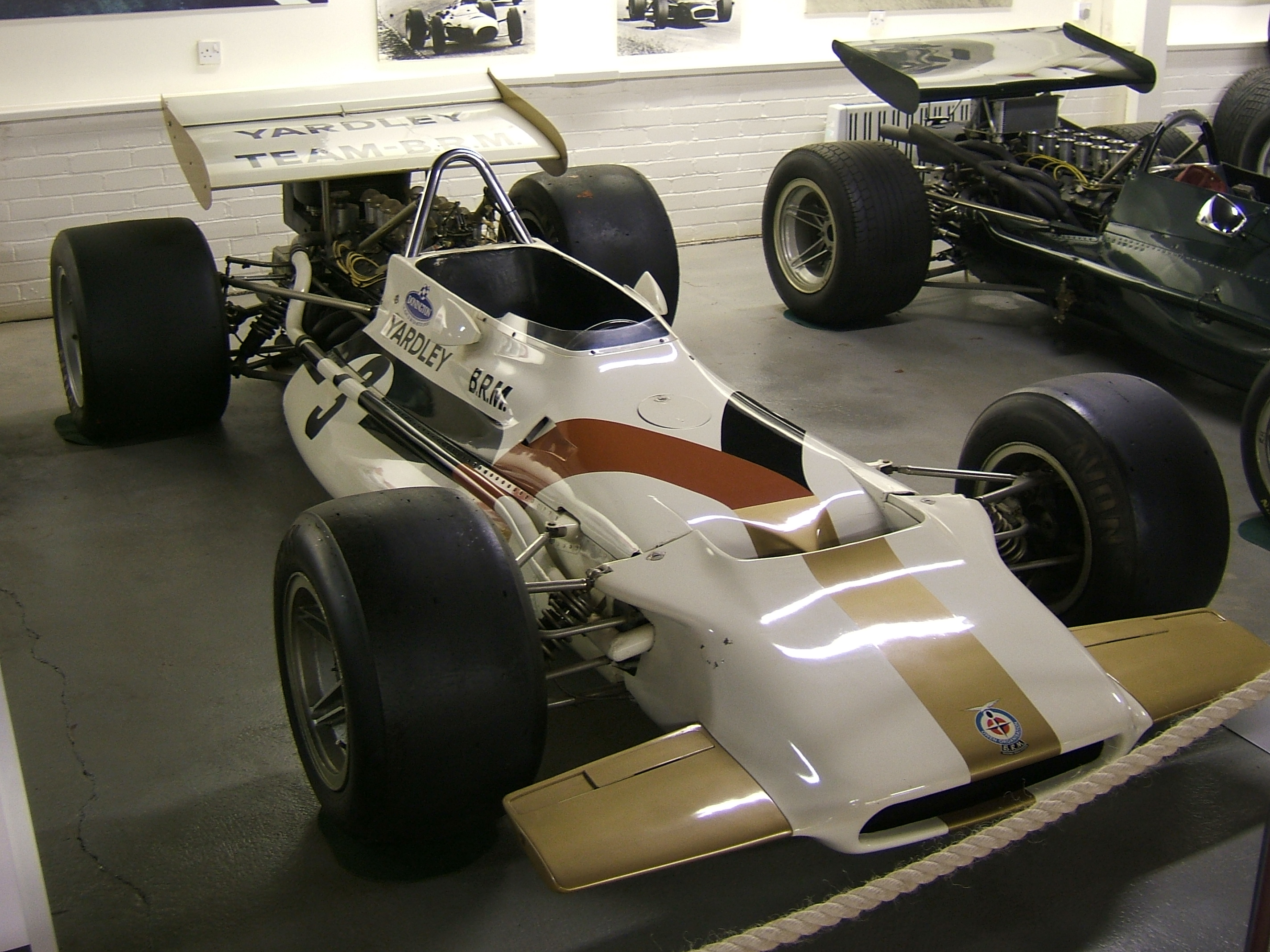
BRM P153 on display

== Personal life ==
Fernández retired from motorsports in 2012. He has two children: Valentina and Niko Fernández, and he married longtime girlfriend, former beauty queen, author, and retired actress Priscila Perales on October 21, 2017. They got married on May 4, 2018, in Miami Beach, Florida. The couple announced their son, Adrián Fernández Jr. was born on October 29, 2020.

== Motorsports career results ==
=== American Open-Wheel ===
(key)

==== CART results ====
Year	Team	No.	1	2	3	4	5	6	7	8	9	10	11	12	13	14	15	16	17	18	19	20	21	Rank	Points	Ref
1993	Galles Racing	11	SRF	PHX	LBH; 23	INDY	MIL; 21	DET; 7	POR	CLE	TOR	MIS; DNS	NHM	ROA; 29	VAN	MOH	NZR	LS; 12						24th	7	
1994	Galles Racing	7	SRF; 13	PHX; 10	LBH; 8	INDY; 28	MIL; 16	DET; 23	POR; 10	CLE; 7	TOR; 13	MIS; 23	MOH; 6	NHM; 8	VAN; 22	ROA; 5	NZR; 21	LS; 7						13th	46	
1995	Galles Racing	10	MIA; 11	SRF; 26	PHX; 12	LBH; 18	NZR; 9	INDY; 21	MIL; 10	DET; 6	POR; 9	ROA; 6	TOR; 7	CLE; 12	MIS; 3	MOH; 4	NHM; 26	VAN; 22	LS; 10					12th	66	
1996	Tasman Motorsports	32	MIA; 11	RIO; 14	SRF; 23	LBH; 6	NZR; 10	500; DNS	MIL; 11	DET; 4	POR; 12	CLE; 6	TOR; 1	MIS; 20	MOH; 6	ROA; 13	VAN; 8	LS; 11						12th	71	
1997	Tasman Motorsports	32	MIA; 13	SRF; 11	LBH; 11	NZR; 23	RIO; 26	STL; 8	MIL; 24	DET; 27	POR; 10	CLE; 17	TOR; 14	MIS; 26	MOH; 23	ROA; 12	VAN; 19	LS; 23	FON; 3					18th	27	
1998	Patrick Racing	40	MIA; 6	MOT; 1*	LBH; 4	NZR; 26	RIO; 3	STL; 18	MIL; 9	DET; 2	POR; 24	CLE; 5	TOR; 9	**MIS**; 23	MOH; 1	ROA; 5	VAN; 15	LS; 7	HOU; 6	SRF; 6	FON; 4			4th	154	
1999	Patrick Racing	40	MIA; 20	MOT; 1*	LBH; 4	NZR; 5	RIO; 20	STL; 21	MIL; 5	POR; 4	CLE; 19	ROA; 3	TOR; 6	MIS; 6	DET; DNS	MOH; Inj	CHI; Inj	VAN; Inj	LS; 5	HOU; 12	SRF; 3	FON; 1		6th	140	
2000	Patrick Racing	40	MIA; 21	LBH; 24	RIO; 1	MOT; 10	NZR; 5	MIL; 8	DET; 21	POR; 12	CLE; 7	TOR; 2	MIS; 6	CHI; 5	MOH; 6	ROA; 2	VAN; 3	LS; 12	STL; 10	HOU; 7	SRF; 1	FON; 5		2nd	158	
2001	Fernández Racing	51	MTY; 19	LBH; 16	TXS; NH	NZR; 19	MOT; 16	MIL; 5	DET; 12	POR; 19	CLE; 21	TOR; 3	MIS; 25	CHI; 10	MOH; 22	ROA; 3	VAN; 21	LAU; 24	ROC; 23	HOU; 14	LS; 10	SRF; 19	FON; 18	18th	45	
2002	Fernández Racing	51	**MTY**; 13	LBH; 10	MOT; 7	**MIL**; 2	LS; 18	POR; 14	CHI; 13	TOR; 9	CLE; 11	VAN; 8	MOH; Inj	ROA; 18	MTL; 12	DEN; 4	ROC; 14	MIA; 7	SRF; 17	FON; Inj	MXC; Inj			14th	59	
2003	Fernández Racing	51	STP; 15	MTY; 4	LBH; 2	BRH; 12	LAU; 15	MIL; 6	LS; 7	POR; 1	CLE; 11	TOR; 9	VAN; 12	ROA; 12	MOH; 7	MTL; 8	DEN; 5	**MIA**; 8*	MXC; 8	SRF; 12	FON; NH			8th	105	

==== IndyCar Series results ====
Year	Team	No.	1	2	3	4	5	6	7	8	9	10	11	12	13	14	15	16	17	Rank	Points	Ref
2004	Aguri-Fernández Racing	5	HMS	PHX; 20	MOT; 18	INDY; 7	TXS; 5	RIR; 7	KAN; 6	NSH; 10	MIL; 8	MIS; 12	KTY; 1	PPIR; 2	NZR; 7	CHI; 1	FON; 1	TX2; 5		**5th**	**445**	
2005	Aguri-Fernández Racing	5	HMS	PHX	STP	MOT	INDY; 14	TXS	RIR	KAN	NSH	MIL	MIS	KTY	PPIR	SNM	CHI	WGL	FON	**29th**	**16**	

=== Complete American Le Mans Series results ===
Year	Entrant	Class	Chassis	Engine	Tires	1	2	3	4	5	6	7	8	9	10	11	12	Rank	Points	Ref
2007	Lowe's Fernández Racing	LMP2	Lola B06/43	Acura 3.4L V8	M	SEB ovr:3 cls:2	STP ovr:6 cls:4	LNB ovr:8 cls:7	TEX ovr:8 cls:7	UTA ovr:7 cls:5	LIM ovr:Ret cls:Ret	MID ovr:4 cls:3	AME ovr:8 cls:6	MOS ovr:8 cls:6	DET ovr:6 :cls:4	PET ovr:Ret cls:Ret	MON ovr:5 cls:3	11th	102	
2008	Lowe's Fernandez Racing	LMP2	Acura ARX-01b	Acura 3.4L V8	M	SEB ovr:DSQ cls:DSQ	STP ovr:10 cls:7	LNB ovr:8 cls:6	UTA ovr:5 cls:5	LIM ovr:5 cls:4	MID ovr:5 cls:3	AME ovr:Ret cls:Ret	MOS ovr:4 cls:2	DET ovr:23 cls:9	PET ovr:Ret cls:Ret	MON ovr:9 cls:7		12th	88	
2009	Lowe's Fernández Racing	LMP2	Acura ARX-01b	Acura 3.4L V8	M	SEB ovr:4 cls:1	STP ovr:2 cls:1	LNB ovr:3 cls:1	UTA ovr:3 cls:1	LIM ovr:7 cls:2	MID ovr:3 cls:1	AME ovr:3 cls:1	MOS ovr:3 cls:1	PET ovr:21 cls:2	MON ovr:2 cls:1			**1st**	**217**	
2010	Aston Martin Racing	LMP1	Lola-Aston Martin B09/60	Aston Martin 6.0 L V12	M	SEB ovr:3 cls:3								PET				NC	-	
2010	Aston Martin Racing	LMP	Lola-Aston Martin B09/60	Aston Martin 6.0 L V12	M		LNB ovr:2 cls:2	MON	UTA	LIM	MID	AME	MOS					NC	-	
2011	Aston Martin Racing	LMP1	Lola-Aston Martin B09/60	Aston Martin 6.0 L V12	M	SEB	LNB	LIM	MOS	MID	AME	BAL	MON ovr:1 cls:1	PET ovr:3 cls:3				7th	25	
2012	Aston Martin Racing	LMGTE Pro	Aston Martin Vantage GTE	Aston Martin 4.5 L V8	M	SEB ovr:34 cls:3												NC	-	
2012	Aston Martin Racing	GT	Aston Martin Vantage GTE	Aston Martin 4.5 L V8	M		LNB ovr:11 cls:5	MON ovr:17 cls:8	LIM	MOS	MID	AME	BAL	VIR	PET			NC	-	

=== 24 Hours of Le Mans results ===
Year	Team	Co-Drivers	Car	Class	Laps	Pos.	Class Pos.
2007	(France) Barazi-Epsilon (United Kingdom) Zytek Engineering	(Japan) Haruki Kurosawa (United Kingdom) Robbie Kerr	Zytek 07S/2	LMP2	301	27th	**2nd**
2010	(United Kingdom) Aston Martin Racing	(Switzerland) Harold Primat (Germany) Stefan Mücke	Lola-Aston Martin B09/60	LMP1	365	6th	5th
2011	(United Kingdom) Aston Martin Racing	(Switzerland) Harold Primat (United Kingdom) Andy Meyrick	Aston Martin AMR-One	LMP1	2	DNF	DNF
2012	(United Kingdom) Aston Martin Racing	(Germany) Stefan Mücke (United Kingdom) Darren Turner	Aston Martin Vantage GTE	GTE; Pro	332	19th	**3rd**

=== NASCAR ===
(key) (Bold – Pole position awarded by qualifying time. Italics – Pole position earned by points standings or practice time. * – Most laps led.)

==== Nationwide Series ====
NASCAR Nationwide Series results
Year	Team	No.	Make	1	2	3	4	5	6	7	8	9	10	11	12	13	14	15	16	17	18	19	20	21	22	23	24	25	26	27	28	29	30	31	32	33	34	35	NNSC	Pts	Ref
2005	Hendrick Motorsports	5	Chevy	DAY	CAL	MXC; 10	LVS	ATL	NSH	BRI	TEX	PHO	TAL	DAR	RCH	CLT	DOV	NSH	KEN	MLW	DAY	CHI	NHA	PPR	GTY	IRP	GLN	MCH	BRI	CAL; 28	RCH	DOV	KAN	CLT; 40	MEM	TEX; 43	PHO; 28	HOM; 42	74th	411	
2006	Hendrick Motorsports	57	Chevy	DAY	CAL	MXC; 12	LVS	ATL	BRI	TEX	NSH	PHO	TAL	RCH	DAR	CLT	DOV	NSH	KEN	MLW	DAY	CHI	NHA	MAR	GTY	IRP	GLN; 17	MCH	BRI	CAL	RCH	DOV	KAN	CLT	MEM	TEX	PHO	HOM	87th	239	
2007	Hendrick Motorsports	5	Chevy	DAY	CAL	MXC; 9	LVS	ATL	BRI	NSH	TEX	PHO	TAL	RCH	DAR	CLT	DOV	NSH	KEN	MLW	NHA	DAY	CHI	GTY	IRP	CGV	GLN	MCH	BRI	CAL	RCH	DOV	KAN	CLT	MEM	TEX	PHO	HOM	115th	138	
2008	JR Motorsports	5	Chevy	DAY	CAL	LVS	ATL	BRI	NSH	TEX	PHO	MXC; 14	TAL	RCH	DAR	CLT	DOV	NSH	KEN	MLW	NHA	DAY	CHI	GTY	IRP	CGV	GLN	MCH	BRI	CAL	RCH	DOV	KAN	CLT	MEM	TEX	PHO	HOM	110th	121	

=== International Race of Champions ===
(key) (Bold – Pole position. * – Most laps led.)

International Race of Champions results
Year	Make	1	2	3	4	Pos.	Points	Ref
1999	Pontiac	DAY; 7	TAL; 6	MCH; 10	IND	10th	28	

== Bibliography ==
- CART Communications Staff (2002). CART FedEx Championship Series Media Guide. Championship Auto Racing Teams, Inc.

Sporting positions
Preceded by Carlos Guerrero	Mexican Formula Three Champion; 1991	Succeeded by César Tiberio Jiménez
