= 2001 Honda Indy 300 =

Coordinates: 27°59′17.9″S 153°25′42.1″E

(Australia) 2001 Surfer's Paradise
Race details
- Race 20 of 21 in the 2001 CART season
- Map of the track
- Date: 28 October, 2001
- Official name: Honda Indy 300
- Location: Surfers Paradise Street Circuit; Queensland, Australia
- Course: Temporary Street Circuit; 2.795 mi / 4.498 km
- Distance: 65 laps 181.675 mi / 292.370 km
- Weather: Sunny

Pole position
- Driver: (Brazil) Roberto Moreno (Patrick Racing)
- Time: 1:30.204

Fastest lap
- Driver: (United States) Jimmy Vasser (Patrick Racing)
- Time: 1:34.113 (on lap 57 of 65)

Podium
- First: (Brazil) Cristiano da Matta (Newman/Haas Racing)
- Second: (United States) Michael Andretti (Team Motorola)
- Third: (Canada) Alex Tagliani (Forsythe Racing)

The 2001 Honda Indy 300 was a Championship Auto Racing Teams (CART) motor race held on 28 October 2001, at the Surfers Paradise Street Circuit, in Surfers Paradise, Queensland, before 110,187 people. It was the 20th and penultimate round of the 2001 CART FedEx Championship Series, the 11th iteration of the Honda Indy 300 and the last race of 2001 to be held outside the United States. Cristiano da Matta of the Newman/Haas Racing team won the 65-lap race from third. Michael Andretti finished second for Team Motorola and Forsythe Racing's Alex Tagliani took third.

Roberto Moreno won the second pole position of his career by recording the fastest lap in qualifying but de Ferran passed him on lap one. De Ferran pulled away from the rest of the field and retained the lead until the first round of pit stops. Moreno retook first by staying on the track for a lap longer than de Ferran. He lost the lead when he retired with a gear selection problem on lap 54. Da Matta assumed the lead and remained there for the remainder of the race to achieve his second victory of the season and the third of his career. Andretti drew closer to da Matta, but he was instructed to manage his fuel usage and took second place. There were two cautions and eight lead changes among five drivers during the race.

The result won Ferran his second consecutive CART Drivers' Championship as Kenny Bräck could not match his points total this late in the season. Hélio Castroneves maintained third despite not scoring any points but was now tied with Andretti as Da Matta overtook Dario Franchitti for fifth. Honda had already won the Manufacturers' Championship at the preceding Honda Grand Prix of Monterey as Toyota passed Ford Cosworth for second. Reynard still led the Constructors' Championship but Lola lowered the advantage by two points with one race left in the season.

== Background ==
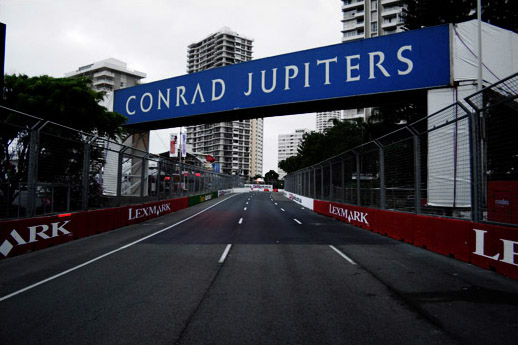
The Surfers Paradise Street Circuit (pictured in 2006), where the race was held.

The Honda Indy 300 was confirmed as part of CART's 2001 schedule for the series in August 2000. It was the 11th consecutive year the race was held as part of the series, and the seventh (and last) round of 2001 to be held outside the United States. The 2001 Honda Indy 300 was the 20th and penultimate race scheduled for 2001 by CART. It was held on 28 October 2001, at the 2.795 mi (4.498 km) 12-turn Surfers Paradise Street Circuit, Queensland. The Australian press anticipated that 300,000 people would visit the track during the weekend. After organisers of the race voiced concerns over the possibility that it would be cancelled if the Government of the United States barred air travel to Australia had the invasion of Afghanistan deteriorated, CART executives stated that the round would proceed as scheduled but with increased security. The chairman of the race Geoff Jones stated, "CART's outlook has been business as usual, they won't be bowing to terrorism." The Gillette Young Guns, GT Performance, Nations Cup, V8 Brutes and V8 Supercars held support races during the weekend.

Entering the race from Laguna Seca two weeks earlier, Team Penske driver Gil de Ferran led the Drivers' Championship with 179 points, 26 ahead of Kenny Bräck of Team Rahal in second. With 141 points, Hélio Castroneves in the second Penske car was third, with Team Motorola's Michael Andretti placed fourth with 125 points and Dario Franchitti of Team Green fifth with 105 points. There were 44 points available for the final two rounds of the season, which meant de Ferran could win his second successive championship if he was 23 or more points ahead of Bräck leaving Australia. Honda had already won the Manufacturers' Championship at the Honda Grand Prix of Monterey as it had an unassailable lead of 316 points. Ford Cosworth and Toyota were equal on points with 266 apiece in second place. With 345 points, Reynard led the Constructors' Championship with an unchallenged advantage of 51 points over Lola.

De Ferran began his charge to the Drivers' Championship lead at the Grand Prix of Chicago in July. He achieved consecutive wins at the Rockingham 500 and the Grand Prix of Houston in the second half of the season to claim the points lead. Although he had not completed a single lap of the Surfers Paradise circuit in 1999 and 2000, de Ferran said he was aware that the race would be of a significant performance to the title battle noting, "The situation is looking relatively good for Marlboro Team Penske, but it's not decided by any means. Heading into Australia last year, we were also in a good position but didn't get through the first corner. Hopefully, we'll be more successful this year." Bräck commented he had not conceded the championship despite having won all four of his races on oval tracks in 2001.

This thing is not over 'til it's over. Sure I'd like to be leading, but I have been in enough championship races to know that we can still pull it off. Actually, we were further behind Gil last year going into Surfers Paradise than we are this year (32 points versus 26 points). So nothing is out of the question. But I would like to score a win and go to California with a strong shot at the championship."

There was one change of driver going into the round. Alex Barron, the 1997 Atlantic champion, replaced Max Wilson in the No. 25 Arciero-Blair Racing car for the final two races of the season. Team owner Larry Blair made the change based on Barron's performance in the final two rounds of the 2000 season at Surfers Paradise and Fontana and because his experience and input were required to help the team advance. Barron said in a press release that he was looking forward to competing for Arciero-Blair Racing. "Last year, I was in contention to win both events – then we had a mechanical problem. 2001 has been a long year not racing a Champ Car. But I have kept myself in shape by working out, testing the 2002 Atlantic chassis and testing for Firestone at the new tracks in Germany and England. It will be good to be back in CART competition and to race for this new team."

== Practice ==
There were three practice sessions preceding Sunday's race. The first practice session on Friday lasted 105 minutes, the second practice running for 90 minutes was held in the afternoon, and the final session took place on Saturday morning lasting 75 minutes. A rain shower on Thursday night made the track slightly wet. Most drivers began on dry slick tyres with a few using wet-weather tyres as they optimised the set-up of their cars. Light drizzle returned to the area 41 minutes into practice, which later turned to a deluge and flooded the track. Jimmy Vasser set the fastest lap of the session with a time of 1:36.911, almost one tenth of a second faster than Castroneves in second. Adrián Fernández, Roberto Moreno, Christian Fittipaldi, Cristiano da Matta, Patrick Carpentier, Bryan Herta, Memo Gidley and Michel Jourdain Jr. filled positions three to ten. Carpentier braked too late for the third corner and slid onto a run-off area but avoided striking the wall and reversed onto the track. The first red flag was waved for two minutes as Scott Dixon lost traction at the rear of his vehicle and went broadside into the turn one chicane. Dixon made minor contact with the barrier and stalled his car, requiring assistance from course officials. Carpentier spun for a second time at turn seven and briefly went airborne after driving over a kerb, breaking a front suspension wishbone. Da Matta ran deep at the turn fourteen hairpin and stalled, stopping the session for four minutes as course officials restarted his car.

The rain eased during the interval between the end of the first practice session and the start of the second session and it appeared that efforts to dry the track would commence. However, heavy rain returned to the area 15 minutes before second practice commenced and yellow flags were necessitated when it began, leading CART and track officials to try to stem the amount of running water on the track by sweeping it to the gutters and using a jet dryer to push it off the groove. The track was made drive-able as a consequence of the officials' work. The green flag was waved by series starter Jim Swintal 50 minutes after the session began to signal the start of practice at racing speeds. Five drivers elected to venture onto the track while the rest of the field stayed in the pit lane to be conservative. Casey Mears was fastest with a 1:57.751 lap on his fourth try, more than 20 seconds slower than Vasser's first practice session lap. Tony Kanaan checked the functionality of his gearbox and was second-quickest, and Fittipaldi completed the lap-setting drivers.

The rain continued until 02:00 Australian Eastern Standard Time (UTC+10:00) and the track was entirely dry with sunny skies before the start of the third practice session. Shinji Nakano and Kanaan went onto the run-off areas at turns eight and nine before the first red flag came for the latter when he slid entering turn two and collided heavily with the left-hand tyre barrier with his car's left-front corner and broke the suspension. A second red flag was necessitated when Tora Takagi slid through the left-hand turn four and glanced the right-hand barrier with his vehicle's right-front corner. Carpentier triggered the third stoppage after stalling in the centre of the circuit between turns four and five and his car was extricated by course officials. The final red flag was needed with 15 minutes left when Herta ran out of fuel and stalled leaving the fourth turn. Paul Tracy spun onto the turn three run-off area but avoid stalling his engine and continued without vehicle damage. De Ferran led the third practice session with a late lap time of 1:33.511, followed by Moreno, Franchitti, Castroneves, da Matta, Alex Tagliani, Max Papis, Oriol Servià, Vasser and Nakano.

== Qualifying ==
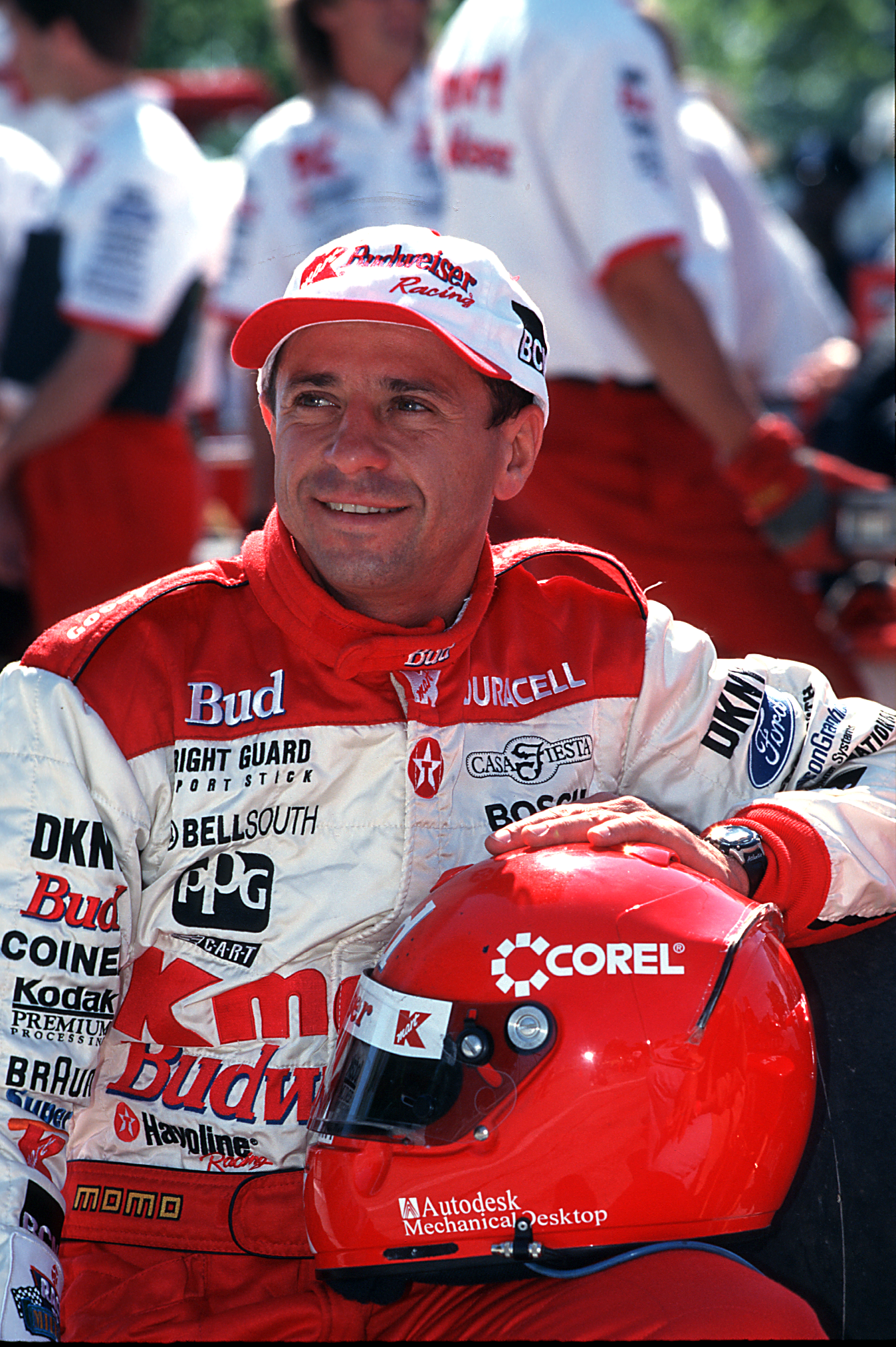
Roberto Moreno (pictured in 1997) took the second pole position of his career in his 100th start in CART.

Saturday afternoon's 75-minute qualifying session saw cars were divided into two groups of thirteen: group one had drivers ranked 13th through 26th in the points standings and those in 1st to 12th with the fastest non-top-12 drivers from the previous road course race in group two. Both groups were allowed half an hour of on-track time with a 15-minute interval between the two groups recording their fastest lap times to determine the event's starting order. Vasser was the first driver to record a benchmark lap when the first of five red flags was necessitated for Takagi who slid straight across the turn eight left-hander and into the right-hand tyre wall, damaging his car's right-front corner. The second came five minutes after the session restarted when Maurício Gugelmin lost traction in his car on the run into the eighth corner and made broad contact with a retaining wall with his car's right-hand side. Gugelmin was transported to hospital for a fractured bone in his right wrist. Barron went airborne when he rode the kerbs at the turn seven chicane and over-corrected en route to hitting the right-hand barrier. His car trailed fire with a broken oil line and the third red flag was consequently waved. The fourth stoppage was caused by Vasser who lost control of his car on the turn five kerbing and slid broadside into the left-hand wall, breaking his car's left-rear suspension and gearbox. Papis caused the final stoppage when he slid into the turn eleven tyre wall, removing his car's front-left wheel.

In his 100th CART start, Moreno took his second career pole position with a time of 1:32.095 which he set on the session's final lap. He was joined on the grid's front row by de Ferran whose best time was 0.311 seconds slower and had the pole until Moreno's lap as de Ferran served an eight-minute penalty. Da Matta used his best tyres early on but it left him third since the maximum amount of tyre grip was lost due to the session's disruptions. Tracy took fourth on his final timed lap while Franchitti over-drove and locked his brakes for fifth. Andretti talked to his chief engineer Eddie Jones about changing his car setup during the interval between third practice and qualifying. He was cautious because he did not want to make an error and had not set a fast enough lap en route to sixth. Tagliani was on a new set of tyres towards qualifying's end when his engine lost around 100 hp (75 kW) due to a wedged butterfly engine valve leaving him seventh. Dixon was the highest-placed rookie in eighth and Carpentier qualified ninth. Vasser took tenth and Castroneves eleventh with Serviá 12th. Bräck qualified 13th after changing his car's front wheel and front-left suspension wishbone due to damage from an accident on his first lap. Behind them the rest of the field lined up as Papis, Fittipaldi, Jourdain, the Fernández Racing duo of Fernández and Nakano, Kanaan, Takagi, Bruno Junqueira, Herta, Gidley, Mears, Gugelmin and Barron.

=== Qualifying classification ===
Qualifying results
Pos	No.	Driver	Team	Time	Speed	Gap
1	20	Roberto Moreno (BRA)	Patrick Racing	1:32.095	109.257	—
2	1	Gil de Ferran (BRA)	Team Penske	1:32.406	108.889	+0.311
3	6	Cristiano da Matta (BRA)	Newman/Haas Racing	1:32.552	108.717	+0.447
4	26	Paul Tracy (CAN)	Team Green	1:32.605	108.655	+0.510
5	27	Dario Franchitti (GBR)	Team Green	1:32.760	108.473	+0.665
6	39	Michael Andretti (USA)	Team Motorola	1:32.971	108.227	+0.866
7	33	Alex Tagliani (CAN)	Forsythe Racing	1:33.137	108.034	+1.042
8	18	Scott Dixon (NZL)	PacWest Racing	1:33.209	107.951	+1.114
9	32	Patrick Carpentier (CAN)	Forsythe Racing	1:33.360	107.776	+1.265
10	40	Jimmy Vasser (USA)	Patrick Racing	1:33.447	107.676	+1.352
11	3	Hélio Castroneves (BRA)	Team Penske	1:33.476	107.643	+1.381
12	22	Oriol Servià (ESP)	Sigma Autosport	1:33.738	107.342	+1.643
13	8	Kenny Bräck (SWE)	Team Rahal	1:33.753	107.325	+1.658
14	7	Max Papis (ITA)	Team Rahal	1:33.843	107.227	+1.748
15	11	Christian Fittipaldi (BRA)	Newman/Haas Racing	1:33.947	107.103	+1.852
16	16	Michel Jourdain Jr. (MEX)	Bettenhausen Racing	1:33.998	107.045	+1.903
17	51	Adrián Fernández (MEX)	Fernández Racing	1:34.035	107.003	+1.940
18	52	Shinji Nakano (JPN)	Fernández Racing	1:34.143	106.880	+2.038
19	55	Tony Kanaan (BRA)	Mo Nunn Racing	1:34.319	106.681	+2.224
20	5	Toranosuke Takagi (JPN)	Walker Racing	1:34.355	106.640	+2.260
21	4	Bruno Junqueira (BRA)	Chip Ganassi Racing	1:34.476	106.503	+2.381
22	77	Bryan Herta (USA)	Forsythe Racing	1:34.721	106.228	+2.626
23	12	Memo Gidley (USA)	Chip Ganassi Racing	1:34.754	106.191	+2.659
24	66	Casey Mears (USA)	Mo Nunn Racing	1:35.401	105.471	+3.306
25	17	Maurício Gugelmin (BRA)	PacWest Racing	1:35.567	105.287	+3.471
26	25	Alex Barron (USA)	Arciero-Blair Racing	1;36.867	103:874	+4.772

== Warm-up ==
The cars took to the track in dry, warm and clear weather at 10:00 local time for a half-hour warm-up session. Gugelmin was cleared to partake in the event by CART director of medical affairs Steve Olvey following fitness tests. Although he glanced the turn two left-hand barrier and punctured his front-left tyre five minutes in, Jourdain lapped fastest at 1:34.934. The Brazilian pair of Castroneves and Moreno were second and third. Serviá, da Matta, Carpentier, Vasser, Dixon, Bräck and Tracy made up positions four to ten. Carpentier ended the session two minutes early when he slid onto a run-off area at the third turn and stalled his engine.

== Race ==
The weather at the start were dry and sunny, with an ambient temperature from 76 to 78 °F (24 to 26 °C) and the track temperature between 114 and 128 °F (46 and 53 °C). Approximately 110,187 people were in attendance. Starter Jim Swintal waved the green flag at 13:57 local time to signal begin the race. De Ferran accelerated faster than Moreno off the line and was ahead of him into the first corner. On the lap, the first caution was displayed when Mears tried to overtake Gidley on the right but braked too late and locked his tyres to avoid striking the rear of Herta's car. He spun on the outside at the turn one chicane and damaged the right-front corner of his car in an impact with a wall. Mears retired due to the damage to his car. He was transported to Allamanda Private Hospital for a precautionary x-ray and treatment to a swollen right index finger. Racing resumed at the start of the third lap as de Ferran led Moreno. On that lap, da Matta out-braked Tracy to pass on the left for fourth at turn three. De Ferran and Moreno began pulling away from the rest of the field, increasing their lead over da Matta to 3.473 seconds by the start of lap ten. Da Matta in turn drew clear from Tracy and Franchitti as Tagliani could not match the Team Green cars' pace. He was 12 seconds behind by lap 12.

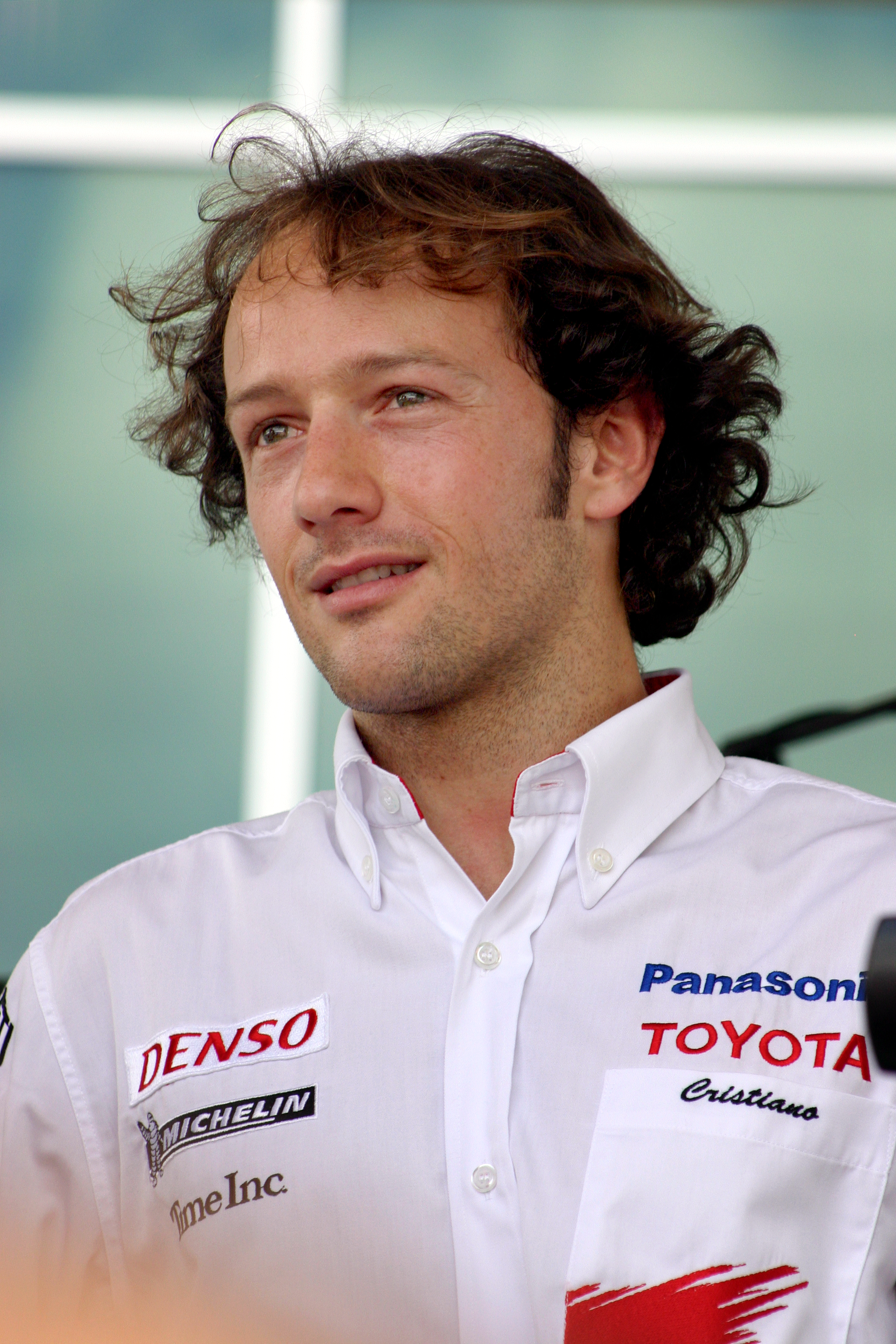
Cristiano da Matta (pictured in 2004) took his second victory of the season and third of his career.

In the meantime, 11th-placed Serviá informed his race engineer Phil Howard of a mechanical failure and stopped his car between turns five and six with a gearbox failure on lap eleven. Five laps later, Castroneves tried to pass Carpentier at turn five but locked his tyres and narrowly avoided hitting the rear of his car. He braked hard to pull back in line to protect eleventh from Bräck. Green flag pit stops began on lap 20 when Junqeuira entered the pit lane. Franchitti did the same on the next lap when a fuel pressure problem caused his engine to misfire forcing him to make his first stop three laps early. He glanced the turn eight barrier on lap 22 but continued without sustaining major car damage. De Ferran made his pit stop from first on the lap and gave the lead back to Moreno. He led lap 23 before entering the pit lane and relinquishing the lead to Dixon. The extra lap Moreno spent on the circuit put him ahead of de Ferran. On lap 24, the second caution was shown for an incident at turn four. Franchitti sought to recover lost ground when he glanced the turn four left wall and spun under heavy acceleration leaving the corner. He could not reverse out of the area and his car overheated. Franchitti's car was extricated by course officials to allow him to continue driving.

CART chief steward Chris Kneifel barred entry to the pit lane to all racers until the pace car picked up the race leader. Third-placed Carpentier was caught out by this and was sent to the rear of the pack. Takagi did the same but avoided a penalty because he drove through pit road. Moreno retook first place when Dixon made his pit stop for fuel and tyres on the 25th lap. Two laps later, the pace car was withdrawn and Moreno retained the lead with de Ferran second and da Matta third. Moreno began pulling away from the rest of the field. A frustrated Bräck attempted to pass Castroneves on the right but was forced onto the inside of the first chicane. This manoeuvre did not lose or gain any time for Bräck who overtook Castroneves soon after. Franchitti became the third retirement with an engine failure on lap 36. He pulled off onto the turn three run-off area so he could leave his car. On the 40th lap, Castroneves was in seventh when he spun onto the turn eight outside run-off area after brake locking. CART safety officials moved Castroneves' vehicle behind the wall, so his engine could be restarted. He fell to 22nd and a lap behind Moreno. De Ferran lowered Moreno's lead to 4.6 seconds by lap 46. Moreno slowed greatly on the backstraight leaving turn four after losing the use of second gear after feeling a vibration.

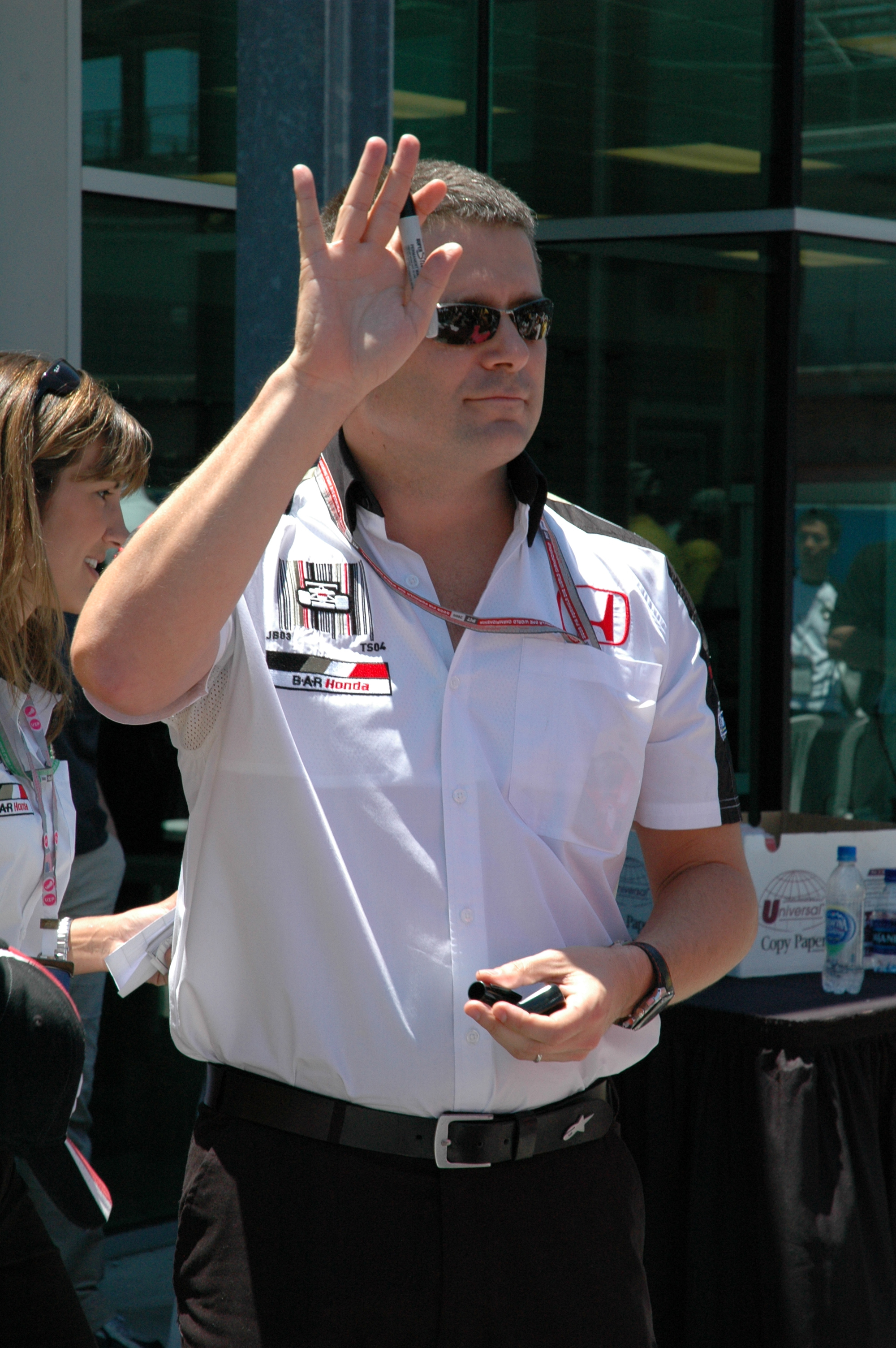
Gil de Ferran (pictured in 2005) won his second consecutive CART Drivers' Championship by finishing fourth.

The second round of green flag pit stops began on the same lap when de Ferran and Tracy entered the pit lane. On lap 47, Moreno lost the lead to da Matta who overtook him on the left of turn five. Andretti and Tagliani made their pit stops from fourth and fifth on lap 48, exiting in sixth and eighth respectively. Da Matta and Moreno entered the pit lane the lap after and returned to the track in fourth and sixth respectively. Vasser led the next two laps until he made his pit stop and Dixon took over the position for one lap. After the pit stops ended on the 52nd lap, da Matta regained the lead by 6.3 seconds over Andretti. On lap 53, Moreno began to slow because his gearbox lost oil pressure and he was instructed to retire for safety reasons on the next lap. Tagliani overtook de Ferran for second leaving turn four on lap 54 as the Penske experienced brake fade. Tracy passed de Ferran for fifth on the 55th lap. Team Penske owner Roger Penske suggested that de Ferran fall behind Bräck; de Ferran was hesitant to do so as he felt he was faster than Bräck despite his braking problems. Two laps later, Junqueira struck the right-hand barrier going into turn three and, onto a nearby run-off area and retired due to car damage. He was unhurt. By this point, Andretti reduced da Matta's lead to 4.6 seconds, but his team radioed Andretti that he needed to conserve fuel to finish.

With two laps to go, Dixon slowed with a gearbox problem exiting turn three and fell from eighth to fifteenth. On the final lap, Tracy's car had a sudden rear bay fire in turn eight and he stopped on the start/finish straight. Tracy exited his vehicle, and CART safety officials quickly extinguished the fire. Unchallenged in the final five laps, da Matta crossed the start/finish line after 65 laps to claim his second victory of the season and the third of his career. Andretti followed 5.786 seconds later in second with Tagliani third. De Ferran finished fourth to win the CART Drivers' Champion for the second successive year as Bräck could not catch his points total with one race remaining. Bräck, Vasser, Jourdain, Fittipaldi, Papis and Gidley rounded out the top ten. Carpentier, Nakano, Barron and Tracy filled positions eleven to fourteen. Although Dixon came 15th and scored no points, he won the Rookie of the Year award. The final finishers were Takagi, Kanaan, Herta, Fernández and Castroneves. There were eight lead changes among five different drivers. Moreno led the most laps of any other driver, with 24. Da Matta led twice for a total of 16 laps.

=== Post-race ===
"It's a dream come true. It really means a lot to me. I guess I still think of myself as this 14-year-old kid that was racing in go-karts and trying to break through. So for me to be sitting here as a two-time champion of a series that I have a very high opinion of is really unbelievable because I look at it from the view of that 14-year-old boy.

— Gil de Ferran on winning his second consecutive CART Drivers' Championship.

Da Matta earned $100,000 for winning the race. He said, "I think my performance is related to the number of people at the races. There were a lot of people in Mexico as well as here today. I think I'm the kind of guy that likes to show off. It's awesome to win in front of a bunch of people. You can feel the excitement. I'm still looking for my big win of the season in the United States though. I'll go back to Fontana for my last chance to do it this season. The team really needed the win and we hope to carry the momentum to the end of the year." Andretti congratulated de Ferran on his championship victory but had mixed feelings over finishing second, "It was a pretty good day. It was a pretty quiet day, but we got pretty lucky before that first yellow. A lot of guys got caught when they closed the pits, but that helped us a little bit." Third-placed Tagliani spoke of his satisfaction with his performance, "I worked real hard for this one, and my crew did its usual outstanding job. Over the last eight qualifying sessions, I’ve been able to be in the fast group and that has enabled me to start closer to the front. Plus, we’ve had a very competitive car for practically every race. If we start next season the way we’re ending this year, we should be in for a great season."

After finishing the race, de Ferran began celebrating his second consecutive CART Drivers' Championship, earning him $1 million. During the celebration, team owner Roger Penske commended de Ferran's perseverance, "Gil did a super job. He came from behind in the points and was fast and consistent when he needed to be. Gil had a lot of pressure on him. It's nice that the championship didn't go down to the wire." De Ferran stated he was "living in a dream" and saw his CART success as comparable to winning the Formula One World Championship, "Certainly, my career was all geared toward going F1, but I can't complain because any driver wants to drive for an operation such as Penske or (F1 front-runners) Williams, Ferrari and McLaren. In a way, I see the Penske organization in a similar light. Penske has not operated in F1 since 1976, but it's a great racing group." Bräck said he was disappointed to lose the championship and put it down to his lack of road course success. Nevertheless, he praised de Ferran and vowed to return to contention in the 2002 season, "We came up short and that's not good, but there are still have a lot of good things from this season that will carry through for me. We'll have to try to win it next year.

The result of the race won de Ferran the Drivers' Championship with 191 points. Bräck was second with 28 less points; Castroneves maintained third position, but Andretti's second-place finish tied him with Castroneves on points. Da Matta overtook Franchitti for fifth with 120 points. In the Manufacturers' Championship, Toyota passed Ford Cosworth for second as leaders Honda led by 34 points. Reynard still led the Manufacturers' Championship with an unchallenged lead of 49 points over Lola with one race remaining in the season.

=== Race classification ===
Race results
Pos	No.	Driver	Team	Laps	Time/retired	Grid	Points
1	6	Cristiano da Matta (BRA)	Newman/Haas Racing	65	1:51:47.260	3	20
2	39	Michael Andretti (USA)	Team Motorola	65	+5.786	6	16
3	33	Alex Tagliani (CAN)	Forsythe Racing	65	+7.526	7	14
4	1	Gil de Ferran (BRA)	Team Penske	65	+20.936	2	12
5	8	Kenny Bräck (SWE)	Team Rahal	65	+22.574	13	10
6	40	Jimmy Vasser (USA)	Patrick Racing	65	+24.706	10	8
7	16	Michel Jourdain Jr. (MEX)	Bettenhausen Racing	65	+39.492	16	6
8	11	Christian Fittipaldi (BRA)	Newman/Haas Racing	65	+40.467	15	5
9	7	Max Papis (ITA)	Team Rahal	65	+42.565	14	4
10	12	Memo Gidley (USA)	Chip Ganassi Racing	65	+42.888	23	3
11	32	Patrick Carpentier (CAN)	Forsythe Racing	65	+46.650	9	2
12	52	Shinji Nakano (JPN)	Fernández Racing	65	+46.871	18	1
13	25	Alex Barron (USA)	Arciero-Blair Racing	65	+59.654	26	—
14	26	Paul Tracy (CAN)	Team Green	65	+1:02.611	4	—
15	18	Scott Dixon (NZL)	PacWest Racing	65	+1:11.993	8	—
16	5	Toranosuke Takagi (JPN)	Walker Racing	65	+1:21.847	20	—
17	55	Tony Kanaan (BRA)	Mo Nunn Racing	65	+1:22.013	3	—
18	77	Bryan Herta (USA)	Forsythe Racing	65	+1:22.370	22	—
19	51	Adrián Fernández (MEX)	Fernández Racing	65	+1:40.263	17	—
20	3	Hélio Castroneves (BRA)	Team Penske	64	+ 1 lap	11	—
21	4	Bruno Junqueira (BRA)	Chip Ganassi Racing	56	Contact	21	—
22	20	Roberto Moreno (BRA)	Patrick Racing	54	Gearbox	1	2^{1}^{2}
23	27	Dario Franchitti (GBR)	Team Green	35	Engine	5	—
24	17	Maurício Gugelmin (BRA)	PacWest Racing	34	Gearbox	25	—
25	22	Oriol Servià (ESP)	Sigma Autosport	10	Gearbox	12	—
26	66	Casey Mears (USA)	Mo Nunn Racing	0	Accident	24	—

- ^1—Includes one bonus point for leading the most laps.
- ^2—Includes one bonus point for being the fastest qualifier.

== Standings after the race ==
Drivers' Championship standings
Rank	+/–	Driver	Points
1		Gil de Ferran (BRA)	191
2		Kenny Bräck (SWE)	163 (−28)
3		Hélio Castroneves (BRA)	141 (−50)
4		Michael Andretti (USA)	141 (−50)
5	1	Cristiano da Matta (BRA)	120 (−71)

Constructors' standings
Rank	+/–	Constructor	Points
1		Reynard (GBR)	363
2		Lola (GBR)	314 (−49)

Manufacturers' standings
Rank	+/–	Manufacturer	Points
1		Honda (JPN)	316
2	1	Toyota (JPN)	288 (−44)
3	1	Ford Cosworth (GBR)	280 (−52)

- Note: Only the top five positions are included for the drivers' standings.

Previous race: 2001 Honda Grand Prix of Monterey	CART FedEx Championship Series; 2001 season	Next race: 2001 Marlboro 500
Previous race: 2000 Honda Indy 300	2001 Honda Indy 300	Next race: 2002 Honda Indy 300
