= 2002 Honda Indy 300 =

Coordinates: 27°59′14″S 153°25′40″E

(Australia) 2002 Honda Indy 300
Race details
- Race 17 of 19 in the 2002 CART season
- Layout of the Surfers Paradise Street Circuit
- Date: October 27, 2002
- Official name: Honda Indy 300
- Location: Surfers Paradise Street Circuit; Queensland, Australia
- Course: Temporary street circuit 2.795 mi / 4.498 km
- Distance: 40 laps 111.800 mi / 179.920 km
- Weather: Wet; persistent rain

Pole position
- Driver: (Brazil) Cristiano da Matta (Newman-Haas Racing)
- Time: 1:30.204

Fastest lap
- Driver: (Brazil) Cristiano da Matta (Newman-Haas Racing)
- Time: 1:56.457 (on lap 7 of 40)

Podium
- First: (Mexico) Mario Domínguez (Herdez Competition)
- Second: (Canada) Patrick Carpentier (Forsythe Racing)
- Third: (Canada) Paul Tracy (Team Green)

The 2002 Honda Indy 300 was a Championship Auto Racing Teams (CART) motor race held on October 27, 2002 at the Surfers Paradise Street Circuit in Queensland, Australia in front of 103,351 fans. It was the seventeenth round of the 2002 CART season, the twelfth running of the event, and the only race of the year to be held in Australia. Herdez Competition driver Mario Domínguez earned his first career CART win in the shortened 40-lap race. Patrick Carpentier, driving for Forsythe Racing, finished second, and Paul Tracy brought home the third position for Team Kool Green.

The race, originally scheduled to be 70 laps, was marred by extremely wet conditions. The initial start saw a multi-car crash injuring Adrián Fernández and Tora Takagi. CART officials shortened the race to 50 laps and allowed teams to repair their cars or pull out backups. After a long delay, the race was restarted on lap 3 with slightly improved conditions. Pole sitter Cristiano da Matta led the first 10 laps. Bruno Junqueira took the lead as da Matta and several other drivers took their first mandatory pit stop under caution, though he gave the lead back to da Matta on lap 18 after making his pit stop. Da Matta led the next eleven laps until he pitted again on lap 30. Michael Andretti inherited the lead thereafter, and he and his team believed they were in position to win once the race reached official race status of the full lap past the halfway point (35 laps plus one) of the original distance (70 laps), since they had already pitted once. However, CART officials made the controversial decision to wait until lap 40 to end the race, which meant that most teams would be forced to pit twice. After Andretti pitted on lap 36, Domínguez inherited the lead and led the final four laps en route to victory.

The finishing order of the race led to da Matta, who had already clinched the Drivers' Championship after Miami, extending his lead to 75 points over Junqueira with two races remaining in the season. Dario Franchitti, Carpentier, and Christian Fittipaldi rounded out the top five. Lola, which also clinched the Constructors' Championship at Denver, lengthened their lead over Reynard to 148 points. With Kenny Bräck's fourth-place finish, Toyota secured the Manufacturers' Championship with a 46-point lead over Honda. The race was criticized for its officiating, and marked another dent in CART's reputation.

== Background ==
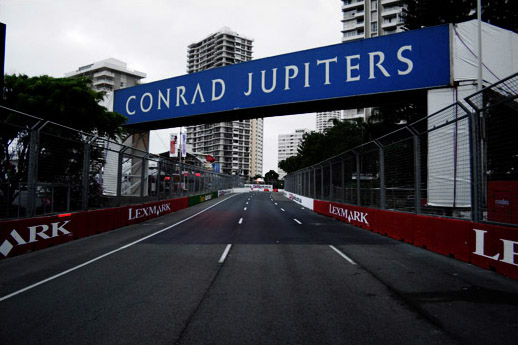
The Surfers Paradise Street Circuit (pictured in 2006), where the race was held.

The Honda Indy 300 was confirmed as part of CART's 2002 schedule in November 2001. It was the 17th of 19 scheduled races by CART, and was held on October 27, 2002 at the Surfers Paradise Street Circuit in Surfers Paradise, Queensland, Australia. The track is a street circuit which features 12 turns and is 2.795 miles (4.498 km) in length. This was the twelfth annual edition of the event, dating back to 1991. Cristiano da Matta was the defending race winner. Over 300,000 people were expected to attend the event, and track organizers erected several new grandstands due to the growing ticket demand for the race. Preluding festivities for the event began on October 20, a week prior to the race, as fans were allowed to spend the day on pit road. Because of the success of the event, CART and the track organizers announced the signing of a new contract on October 24, which allowed the event to be held every year through 2008.

Heading into the event, Newman/Haas Racing driver da Matta had already clinched the Drivers' Championship due to his win in the Grand Prix Americas at Miami the race prior. He earned 212 points at this point in the season, 69 ahead of Bruno Junqueira. Dario Franchitti sat in third with 129 points, while Patrick Carpentier, with 115 points, and Christian Fittipaldi, with 114 points, rounded out the top five. Lola had also clinched the Constructors' Championship with Junqueira's win at Denver, gaining a total of 335 points. Reynard held second with 193 points. As for the Manufacturers' Championship, Toyota obtained 287 points and extended their lead to 46 points over Honda. Ford was 81 points behind Toyota and was eliminated from championship contention after Miami. Toyota had a chance to lock up the championship by scoring at least 20 points in the remaining three races.

Da Matta was relived that he had clinched his first CART championship. He admitted that he felt "lighter" after winning the championship and focused his efforts on winning the final three races of the season, starting with Surfers Paradise. On October 24, da Matta honored his championship efforts by donning the #1 on his car, which remained from Surfers Paradise to the season finale in Mexico. Fittipaldi, da Matta's teammate, reminisced about his various experiences in Australia, including his severe crash during the event in 1997 and his podium finish a year later. Numerous drivers, such as Team KOOL Green teammates Paul Tracy and Dario Franchitti, Oriol Servià, Michael Andretti, and Jimmy Vasser all sung their praises about the track and its fans.

Despite the excitement leading up to the race, CART had suffered a big loss in sponsorship. On October 25, CART president Chris Pook announced that FedEx would no longer be the series' title sponsor after 2002. Pook explained: "As a series sponsor, we loved them. But the fact of the matter is in these sort of series, you have to have a series sponsor who activates to the retail market. That was not FedEx's game plan, that was never their game plan." FedEx pulling their sponsorship was another huge blow to CART, which had suffered from a string of drivers, teams, and engine manufacturers switching to CART's rival sanctioning body, the Indy Racing League, in the past two years.

Pook also played down the rumors about a possible merger between CART and Formula One in 2003, saying he only talked to F1 executive Bernie Ecclestone for advice: "I'm not going to deny to anybody that I've talked with Bernie Ecclestone. He's a friend. He's also the most intelligent man in motor racing in the world. And there is no doubt that I am rebuilding this series. So it's logical that I would go to someone like that and say, 'Hey, am I going in the right direction?' That's what's going on." He went on to call the rumors "flattering from [CART's] point of view, but also very embarrassing", and firmly denied them.

== Practice and qualifying ==
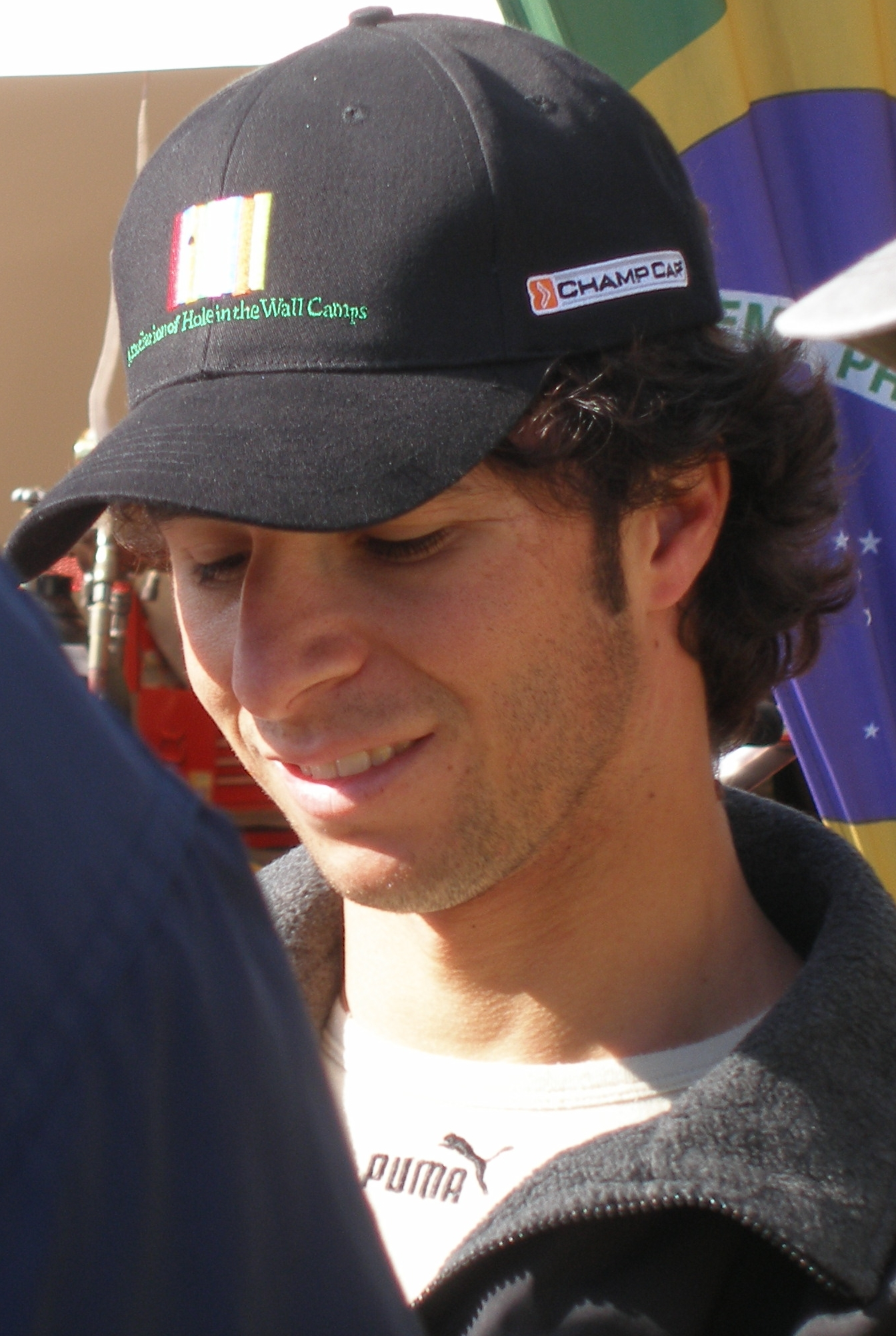
Bruno Junqueira (pictured in 2006) lost the pole position by one hundredth of a second.

There were two practice sessions that preceded the race on Sunday. The first session on Friday morning ran for 80 minutes, and the final session on Saturday morning ran for 75 minutes. Luminous skies befitted the Surfers Paradise race course on Friday, with temperatures in excess of 80 °F (27 °C). Cristiano da Matta set the fastest lap of the session, with a time of 1 minute and 32.977 seconds, ahead of Adrián Fernández in second. Jimmy Vasser, Paul Tracy, and Michel Jourdain Jr. rounded out the top five. Dario Franchitti, who was sixteenth fastest, only completed seven laps before clutch issues prematurely ended his practice session. Three red flags were issued during this session. The first red flag occurred ten minutes into the session and lasted for two minutes, when Tora Takagi spun and had to be restarted by the CART safety team. Da Matta stopped the session for five minutes after he lost power at the runoff area in turn three. With eighteen minutes left, the session was paused for the final time as course officials checked a surface condition in the first turn.

The next morning, skies remained sunny as temperatures reached 86 °F (30 °C). Da Matta led the field again in the final practice session, setting a time of 1 minute and 31.514 seconds. Kenny Bräck, Scott Dixon, Bruno Junqueira, and Fernández were second through fifth. The session featured three stoppages, two of which were due to incidents. Eleven minutes in, several cones were knocked over at the apex of turn six, which exposed the bolts in the asphalt that secured them to the surface. After Christian Fittipaldi spun without contact in turn one, CART officials extended the red flag in order for course officials to make further repairs to the surface near turn six. Takagi later drove into the runoff area in turn three and was not able to engage reverse gear.

Qualifying was divided into two sessions, one on Friday afternoon and one on Saturday afternoon. The fastest driver in each session would be awarded one championship point and was guaranteed a front-row starting position, regardless of the results of the other session. One preliminary practice session was held for each qualifying session. Tony Kanaan was fastest in the fifteen-minute practice session on Friday, which was brought to a brief halt four minutes in when Domínguez slammed head-on into the tire barrier near turn one. Domínguez was uninjured, and his team was able to repair his car in time for qualifying. The qualifying session on Friday, which lasted for 35 minutes, saw three red flags. The first red flag was flown for Vasser, who was fourth quickest at the time, stop his car in turn one with heavy damage. Vasser was uninjured, but lost his fastest lap. Four minutes after the session went back to green flag conditions, Franchitti crashed in turn eight, sustaining heavy right-side damage. Finally, with twelve minutes remaining, Carpentier locked up his brakes and crashed into the tire barriers in turn one. By the end of the session, Junqueira had won the provisional pole position, with a time of 1 minute and 31.515 seconds. Junqueira's lap was just six hundredths of a second quicker than Tracy's fastest lap, and he didn't set the lap until there was only seven minutes remaining. Tracy qualified second, and Dixon, da Matta, and Kanaan took positions three through five. Junqueira's lap also established a new track record for the Surfers Paradise Street Circuit. After qualifying, Junqueira attributed his fastest lap to a setup change that his team made following Friday morning's practice session.

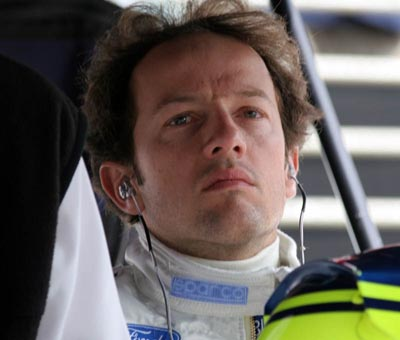
Cristiano da Matta (pictured in 2006) won the pole position.

In the ten-minute preliminary practice session on Saturday afternoon, da Matta put down the fastest lap, with a time of 1 minute and 31.251 seconds, improving from his previous fastest lap of the weekend. Dixon and Jourdain Jr. were second and third quickest. The 40-minute qualifying session that followed only featured only one stoppage, which occurred eight minutes in when Fittipaldi spun without contact in turn one and stalled his car. Tracy also briefly got airborne after missing a chicane, and ended his qualifying run two laps later due to suspension issues. Just before the halfway mark of the session, Bräck set the fastest lap of either qualifying session, which was nearly six tenths quicker than Junqueira's lap the day prior. However, Bräck was almost immediately outshined by da Matta, who set a lap two tenths faster than Bräck's. With thirteen minutes remaining, Junqueira defended his provisional pole by setting the new fastest lap over da Matta. However, with under six minutes left, da Matta returned to the track one last time and put down a lap which was one hundredth of a second quicker than Junqueira. Da Matta's fastest lap time of 1 minute and 30.204 seconds awarded him the pole position for Sunday's race, marking his seventh (and final) pole position of the 2002 season and his CART career. It also set a new track record for Surfers Paradise, besting Junqueira's lap from Friday's qualifying and Franchitti's track record set in 1999. Junqueira joined him on the front row. Da Matta's record-setting lap was nearly one-and-a-half seconds faster than Franchitti's record-setting lap, and many drivers credited the increase in speed to the slight changes in the course. Prior to the race, the wall on the left side of the exit of the first turn was moved back four feet, which led to drivers racing 10 miles per hour (16 km/h) faster than in previous years.

=== Qualifying classification ===
Pos	No.	Driver	Team	Time		Grid
Pos	No.	Driver	Team	Round 1	Round 2	Grid
1	1	(Brazil) Cristiano da Matta	Newman/Haas Racing	1:32.162	1:30.204	1
2	4	(Brazil) Bruno Junqueira	Target Chip Ganassi Racing	1:31.515	1:30.214	2
3	10	(Brazil) Tony Kanaan	Mo Nunn Racing	1:32.267	1:30.427	3
4	12	(Sweden) Kenny Bräck	Target Chip Ganassi Racing	1:32.900	1:30.616	4
5	26	(Canada) Paul Tracy	Team KOOL Green	1:31.575	1:30.731	5
6	44	(New Zealand) Scott Dixon	Target Chip Ganassi Racing	1:32.143	1:30.810	6
7	52	(Japan) Shinji Nakano	Fernández Racing	1:32.663	1:30.936	7
8	27	(United Kingdom) Dario Franchitti	Team KOOL Green	1:35.278	1:31.040	8
9	20	(Spain) Oriol Servià	Visteon/Patrick Racing	1:32.794	1:31.087	9
10	51	(Mexico) Adrián Fernández	Fernández Racing	1:32.301	1:31.351	17^{1}
11	8	(United States) Jimmy Vasser	Team Rahal	1:32.428	1:31.369	10
12	9	(Mexico) Michel Jourdain Jr.	Team Rahal	1:32.384	1:31.709	11
13	11	(Brazil) Christian Fittipaldi	Newman/Haas Racing	10:26.085	1:32.223	12
14	33	(Canada) Alex Tagliani	Team Player's	1:33.770	1:32.300	13
15	32	(Canada) Patrick Carpentier	Team Player's	1:33.506	1:32.367	14
16	39	(United States) Michael Andretti	Team Motorola	1:32.574	1:32.439	15
17	5	(Japan) Tora Takagi	Walker Racing	1:32.710	1:32.522	18^{1}
18	55	(Mexico) Mario Domínguez	Herdez Competition	1:35.161	1:33.655	16

Notes

- ^1 – When the race began, Adrián Fernández and Tora Takagi were injured in a massive pileup. While the others drivers involved were able to race their backup cars, Fernández and Takagi forfeited their starting positions and did not start.

== Warm-up ==
The drivers took to the track on Sunday at 10:00 local time for the thirty-minute warm-up session. For the first time all weekend, rain began pouring on the track, and teams had to use rain tires to suit the track conditions. The slick racing surface caused numerous spins and crashes involving drivers such as Paul Tracy, Michel Jourdain Jr., Mario Domínguez, and Dario Franchitti. Other drivers also drove into the runoff areas, but continued. At the end of the session, only two drivers, Christian Fittipaldi and Tora Takagi, were able to complete a full lap. Fittipaldi was fastest over Takagi with a lap of 2 minutes and 12.443 seconds.

== Race ==
The race's broadcast began at 2:00 PM local time on Sunday, October 27. It was televised live on the Speed Channel, with Bob Varsha serving as the play-by-play commentator, and Tommy Kendall and Scott Pruett taking the roles of the color commentators. The rain at Surfers Paradise had only worsened, and air temperatures decreased to 71 °F (22 °C). 103,351 fans were in attendance for the race. Due to the immense rain, CART officials mandated a single-file rolling start for the drivers' safety. The green flag was waved by CART Series Starter Jim Swintal at 2:05 PM, and Junqueira immediately made a pass on pole sitter da Matta for the race lead. As the leaders approached the first corner, a massive crash had occurred behind them and the red flag was quickly issued, signaling drivers to stop the race. The crash was seemingly sparked by Vasser making contact with the rear of Fernández's car as he slowed on the frontstretch. The course was blocked, and several drivers piled into the crash. Andretti slammed into the back of Alex Tagliani's car, which launched him into the air and upside-down. Takagi and Carpentier, both of whom were already caught up in the crash, were T-boned at full speed by Domínguez. When the dust had settled, it was reported that Vasser, Jourdain Jr., Carpentier, Tagliani, Fernández, Andretti, Franchitti, Domínguez, and Takagi were all involved in the crash. Vasser and Takagi both landed upside-down. While Vasser and most other drivers involved were uninjured, Fernández and Takagi were carried out of their cars in stretchers and taken to the Gold Coast Hospital. Takagi underwent precautionary X-rays after complaining about pain in his pelvis.

During the red flag, many drivers stated that the visibility was far too low, which is what contributed to the pileup. CART officials announced that the start of the race was waved off and every driver who was involved in the crash (except Fernández and Takagi, as they were still being treated for injuries) would be permitted to use their backup cars for the upcoming start. Most teams pulled out their backup cars, while Domínguez's team repaired the suspension damage to his primary car. The race had also been shortened to 50 laps, and 35 laps (half of the originally scheduled distance) were required to be completed in order for the race to be declared official. Postponing the race was not an option due to international travel logistics, as cars had to get to Fontana, California by Tuesday to allow for conversion to superspeedway configuration and the 500-mile oval race scheduled the following weekend. Logistics of the street course circuit also played a factor, as organizers were contractually required to have the entire course cleared by the next morning. During the red flag, CART president Chris Pook held a meeting with its drivers to discuss safety concerns ahead of the event. After an 81-minute delay to clean the course, the sixteen remaining drivers showed up to the starting grid and refired their engines to start the race again. With rain finally clearing up, the race began under yellow flag conditions for the first three laps. The green flag was waved at 3:43 PM on lap 4 to mark the beginning of the race, and pole sitter da Matta promptly fired away from the rest of the field. Bräck also outbraked and made a pass on Kanaan for third position. The race went without any incidents until the sixth lap, when Domínguez went into the runoff area in turn eight, but continued. A lap later, Tracy spun in turn nine and made slight contact with the wall and Tagliani, but continued. The lap after that, course officials threw local caution flags in turn eight for reported rain. The rain would soon fall across the entire course again and visibility began to deteriorate, leading to a full-course caution being issued on lap 10. From this point until the race's end, the green flag was not displayed and the last thirty-one laps were run under caution.

Da Matta, the race leader, was among the many drivers that chose to pit on lap 11, thus forfeiting the lead to Junqueira, who was originally running in second. On lap 11, Servià's engine compartment went ablaze and he drove into the runoff area in turn four for safety. He quickly exited his car and subsequently retired from the race, becoming the first retiree of the sixteen remaining drivers. As the race continued under yellow-flag conditions, jet dryers were sent out to clean the course on the first turn. Teams also figured that standing water would soon become an issue, and strategy began coming into play. Andretti, believing that the race would be called on lap 36 (the halfway mark of the originally scheduled distance), pitted on lap 16 so that the race would end before he reached the maximum number of laps before a mandatory pit stop under CART's pit window rule. Da Matta, who ran second after pitting, reassumed the first position after Junqueira made his first mandatory pit stop on lap 19. Meanwhile, Dixon reported a loss of voltage within his car and entered pit road on lap 21. Three laps later, he retired from the race for mechanical issues. Da Matta continued leading until lap 30. Since it had been twenty laps since his last pit stop, he and other front-runners were required to reenter pit road. Da Matta later spun on lap 34, ending any hopes he had of winning. With the halfway point of the race quickly drawing near, this put Andretti and his team right where they had hoped: the race lead. However, on or around lap 35, CART officials finally announced that the race would end after 40 laps to ensure that every driver would pit twice. This ruined Andretti and many other teams' strategies, and they were all forced to pit on lap 37. This gave Domínguez, who pitted four times, with his last pit stop occurring on lap 22, the race lead. Since Domínguez's last stop was within 20 laps of the finish, he was able to lead the final four laps and cruise to the victory.

Domínguez's win was not only the first win of his career, but also the first win for Herdez Competition since the team first entered CART in 1986. Canadian drivers Carpentier and Tracy finished second and third. Bräck and Kanaan rounded out the top five, and Tagliani, Franchitti, da Matta, Andretti, and Jourdain Jr. took positions six through ten. Fittipaldi, Vasser, Nakano, and Junqueiro were the last classified drivers. Due to the abundance of caution laps, Domínguez's average speed was 55.849 miles per hour (89.880 km/h), the slowest winning average speed in a Champ car race (excluding the Pikes Peak Hill Climb) since 1926.

=== Post-race ===
Domínguez, Carpentier, and Tracy all appeared on the podium to celebrate their finishing positions. Domínguez earned $100,000 in race winnings. During post-race celebrations, Domínguez was in disbelief and thanked his team for the successful strategy: "I feel like the luckiest man in the world at the moment, but I had great strategy from my team and they really deserve this." He also commented on the circumstances surrounding the win: "A win is a win. You have to take it any way it comes. We had so many opportunities for good results this year but we had a lot of bad luck. Obviously this wasn't the best way to win it, but the team deserves the result." Tracy was disappointed by how the race played out: "I've never seen anything like this. It's such a shame for CART and the teams and all of the Gold Coast fans who came out here. Mother Nature really dealt us a bad hand today."

Andretti, who finished ninth in what was his final race at Surfers Paradise, was very upset about the ending of the race: "This is a real disappointment. The conditions were horrible. I could barely see the car in front of me. I thought Team Motorola made the right call bringing me in on Lap 16 because then I would not have had to pit before the race became official. This is just terribly disappointing." His team co-owner, Kim Green, was furious with CART's officiating: "CART made it clear after the restart the race would be 36 laps so we played our strategy accordingly. We felt like we won but CART obviously decided something different and it's the worst officiating I've ever seen." Several of Green's crew members felt that CART deliberately extended the race from 36 laps to 40 laps in order for Andretti to lose the race, as he had already announced his switch to the rival sanctioning body, the Indy Racing League, in 2003. Robin Miller of ESPN was equally as critical of the finish, stating in an article: "Mario Dominguez will be credited with a victory in the CART record book but, trust me, there were no winners in this embarrassing mess." He continued by calling Domínguez's celebration on the podium "nearly as embarrassing as this dreary chapter in CART's history", and considered it to be "one of the reasons why manufacturers like Honda and Toyota are leaving CART at the end of 2002."

CART chief steward Chris Kneifel justified his ruling of the race's finish in a post-race conference with reporters: "I would venture to guess no matter what lap we picked, there was going to be people that were happy and people that were not happy, and possibly even more than unhappy. I think that goes without saying. It's not our job to worry about who we please and who we don't please, nor is it our job to look and see who might win, who might not win, based on the different strategies that play out." He also denied the allegations of rigging the race in order for Andretti to lose: "Any insinuation that we did something wrong to Michael because he's going to another series is ludicrous. No matter what lap we picked to stop the race we could not make everyone happy but it's not our job to worry about who we please. We made every attempt to make a decision based on integrity and fair play." For the 2003 season and beyond, the rulebook was changed to allow races to be called prior to halfway with only half points being awarded.

After the race, it was announced that Fernández had suffered two thoracic fractures from his first-lap crash. Dr. Steve Olvey, CART's director of medical affairs, stated that the fractures did not require surgery and Fernández had already been released from the hospital; however, he was required to wear a cervical collar for comfort. He was also unable to run the following race at Auto Club. It was later announced on November 14 that he was also prohibited from running in the season finale at Mexico City. As for Takagi, he had suffered minor fractures to his pelvis but drove in the final two races of the season.

The complete finishing order resulted in da Matta gaining a total of 219 points in the Drivers' Championship, which he had already clinched. He widened his championship lead to 75 points over Junqueira. Franchitti maintained third with 135 points. Carpentier, with 131 points, and Fittipaldi, with 116 points, rounded out the top five. In the Constructors' Championship, Lola, which also clinched the championship several races prior, earned a total of 357 points, 148 more than Reynard. In the Manufacturers' Championship, Toyota managed to secure the championship on account of Bräck's fourth-place finish in this race. They earned 301 points with two races to go, while Honda earned 255 points.

=== Race classification ===
Pos	No.	Driver	Team	Laps	Time/Retired	Grid	Points
1	55	(Mexico) Mario Domínguez	Herdez Competition	40	2:00:06.524	16	20
2	32	(Canada) Patrick Carpentier	Team Player's	40	+2.177	14	16
3	26	(Canada) Paul Tracy	Team KOOL Green	40	+2.549	5	14
4	12	(Sweden) Kenny Bräck	Target Chip Ganassi Racing	40	+2.747	4	12
5	10	(Brazil) Tony Kanaan	Mo Nunn Racing	40	+4.794	3	10
6	33	(Canada) Alex Tagliani	Team Player's	40	+7.828	13	8
7	27	(United Kingdom) Dario Franchitti	Team KOOL Green	40	+9.940	8	6
8	1	(Brazil) Cristiano da Matta	Newman/Haas Racing	40	+12.338	1	7^{2}
9	39	(United States) Michael Andretti	Team Motorola	40	+13.511	15	4
10	9	(Mexico) Michel Jourdain Jr.	Team Rahal	40	+13.644	11	3
11	11	(Brazil) Christian Fittipaldi	Newman/Haas Racing	40	+14.792	12	2
12	8	(United States) Jimmy Vasser	Team Rahal	40	+16.232	10	1
13	52	(Japan) Shinji Nakano	Fernández Racing	40	+17.570	7	—
14	4	(Brazil) Bruno Junqueira	Target Chip Ganassi Racing	40	+18.106	2	1^{3}
15	44	(New Zealand) Scott Dixon	Target Chip Ganassi Racing	24	Electrical	6	—
16	20	(Spain) Oriol Servià	Visteon/Patrick Racing	11	Fire	9	—
17	51	(Mexico) Adrián Fernández	Fernández Racing	0	Did not start	17	—
18	5	(Japan) Tora Takagi	Walker Racing	0	Did not start	18	—

Notes

- ^2 — Includes two bonus points for winning the pole position and leading the most laps.
- ^3 — Includes one bonus point for leading the slowest qualifying group.

== Championship standings after the race ==
Drivers' Championship standings
Pos.	Driver	Points
1	(Brazil) Cristiano da Matta	219
2	(Brazil) Bruno Junqueira	144 (−75)
3	(United Kingdom) Dario Franchitti	135 (−84)
4	(Canada) Patrick Carpentier	131 (−88)
5	(Brazil) Christian Fittipaldi	116 (−103)

Constructors' standings
Pos.	Constructor	Points
1	(United Kingdom) Lola	357
2	(United Kingdom) Reynard	209 (−148)

Manufacturers' standings
Pos.	Manufacturer	Points
1	(Japan) Toyota	301
2	(Japan) Honda	255 (−46)
3	(United Kingdom) Ford-Cosworth	226 (−75)

- Note: Only the top five positions are included for the drivers' standings.

Previous race: 2002 Grand Prix Americas	CART FedEx Championship Series; 2002 season	Next race: 2002 The 500
Previous race: 2001 Honda Indy 300	Gold Coast Indy 300	Next race: 2003 Lexmark Indy 300
