= Fernández Racing =

Mexican motor racing team

(Mexico) Fernández Racing
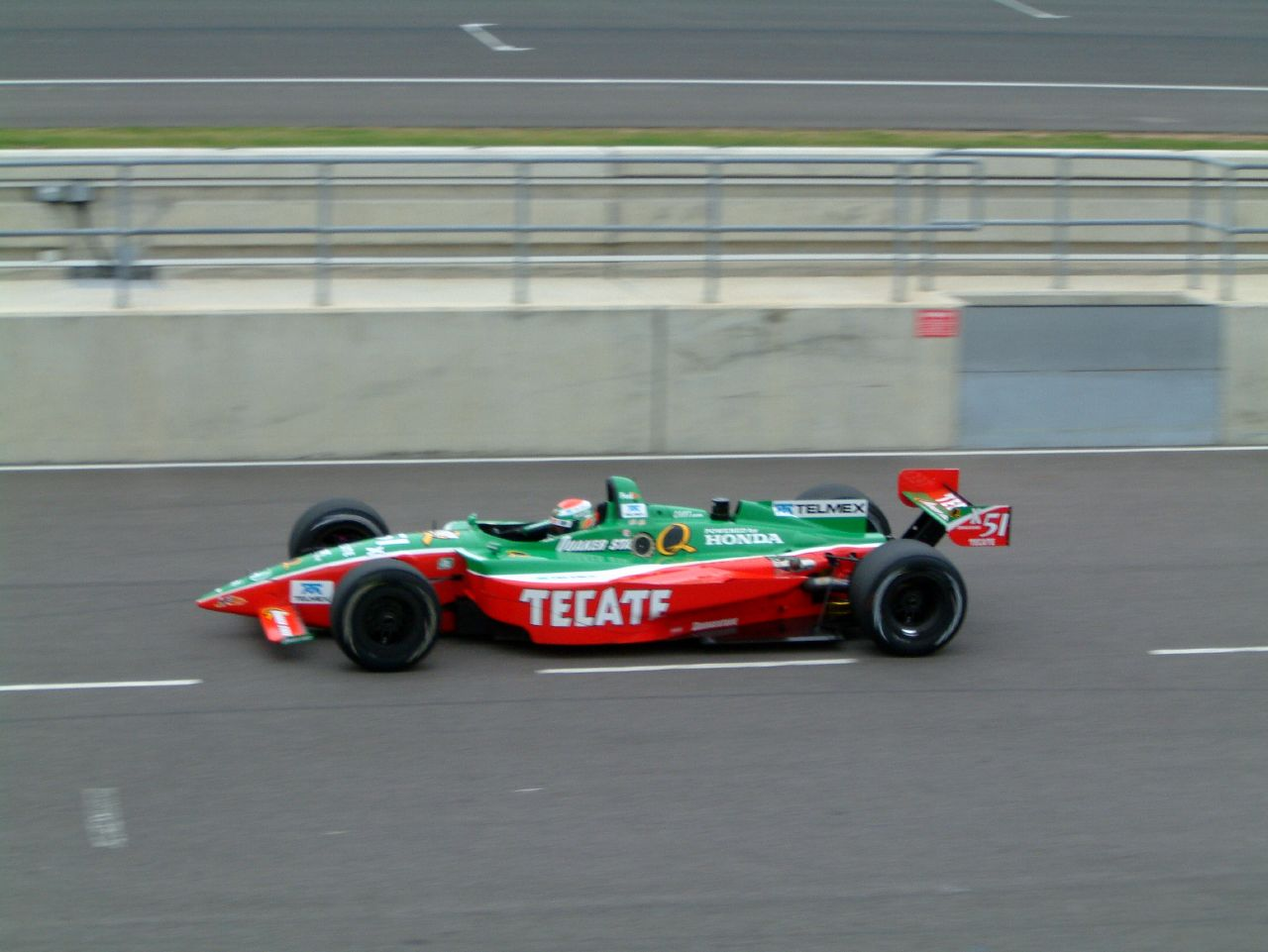
- Founded: 2001
- Team principal(s): Adrian Fernández; Tom Anderson
- Former series: IndyCar Series; American Le Mans Series; Champ Car; Rolex Sports Car Series
- Teams' Championships: 2009 American Le Mans Series
- Drivers' Championships: 2009 American Le Mans Series: Adrián Fernández, Luis Díaz

Fernández Racing was a Mexican motor racing team that competed in the American Le Mans Series, Champ Car, the IRL IndyCar Series, and the Rolex Sports Car Series. The team was co-founded by Adrian Fernández and Tom Anderson in 2001.

== Open wheel ==
The team competed in the Champ Car ranks with Fernández and Shinji Nakano driving. In 2003 they downsized to one car, dropping Nakano, but scored their first victory at Portland International Raceway. A late decision just prior to the start of 2004 saw Fernández Racing switch ranks, as many other teams did during a tumultuous two-year period, from Champ Car to the IndyCar Series. Fernández won three races that year, at Kentucky Speedway, Chicagoland Speedway and California Speedway.

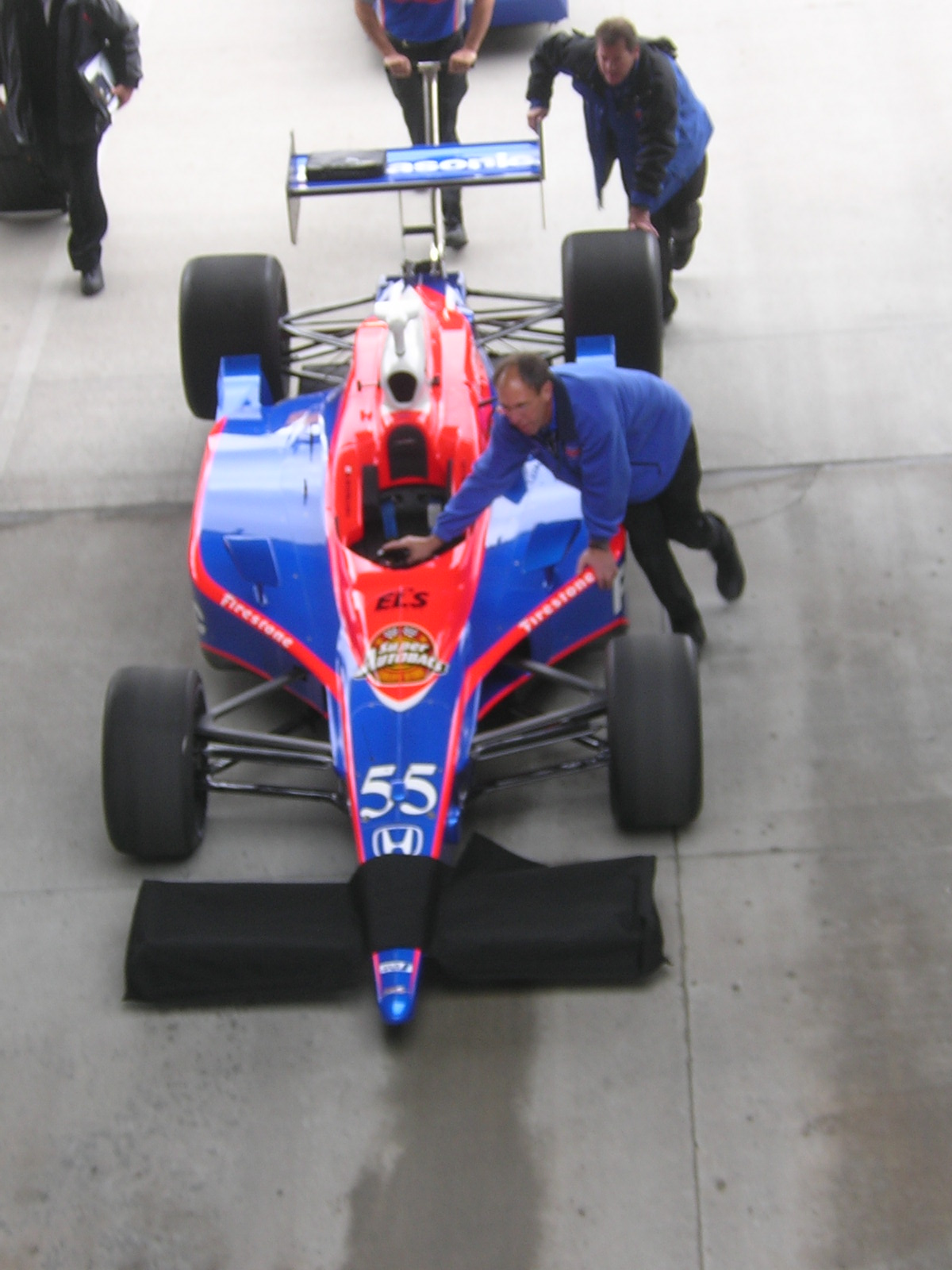
Super Aguri Fernández Racing's #55 car driven by Kosuke Matsuura

In 2005 Fernández himself only drove at the Indianapolis 500 in a joint effort with Mo Nunn Racing. The team had two branches under their banner: Delphi Fernandez Racing, which ran Scott Sharp, and Super Aguri Fernandez Racing, co-owned by Aguri Suzuki, that ran Kosuke Matsuura. The team has also branched into the Grand-Am ranks, under the Lowe's Fernandez Racing guise, fielding a Daytona Prototype for drivers Fernandez and Mario Haberfeld.

For 2007, Fernández ended his involvement in both the IndyCar Series and Grand-Am series, with his partner Aguri Suzuki and driver Kosuke Matsuura leaving to join Panther Racing in the IndyCar Series.

== American Le Mans Series ==
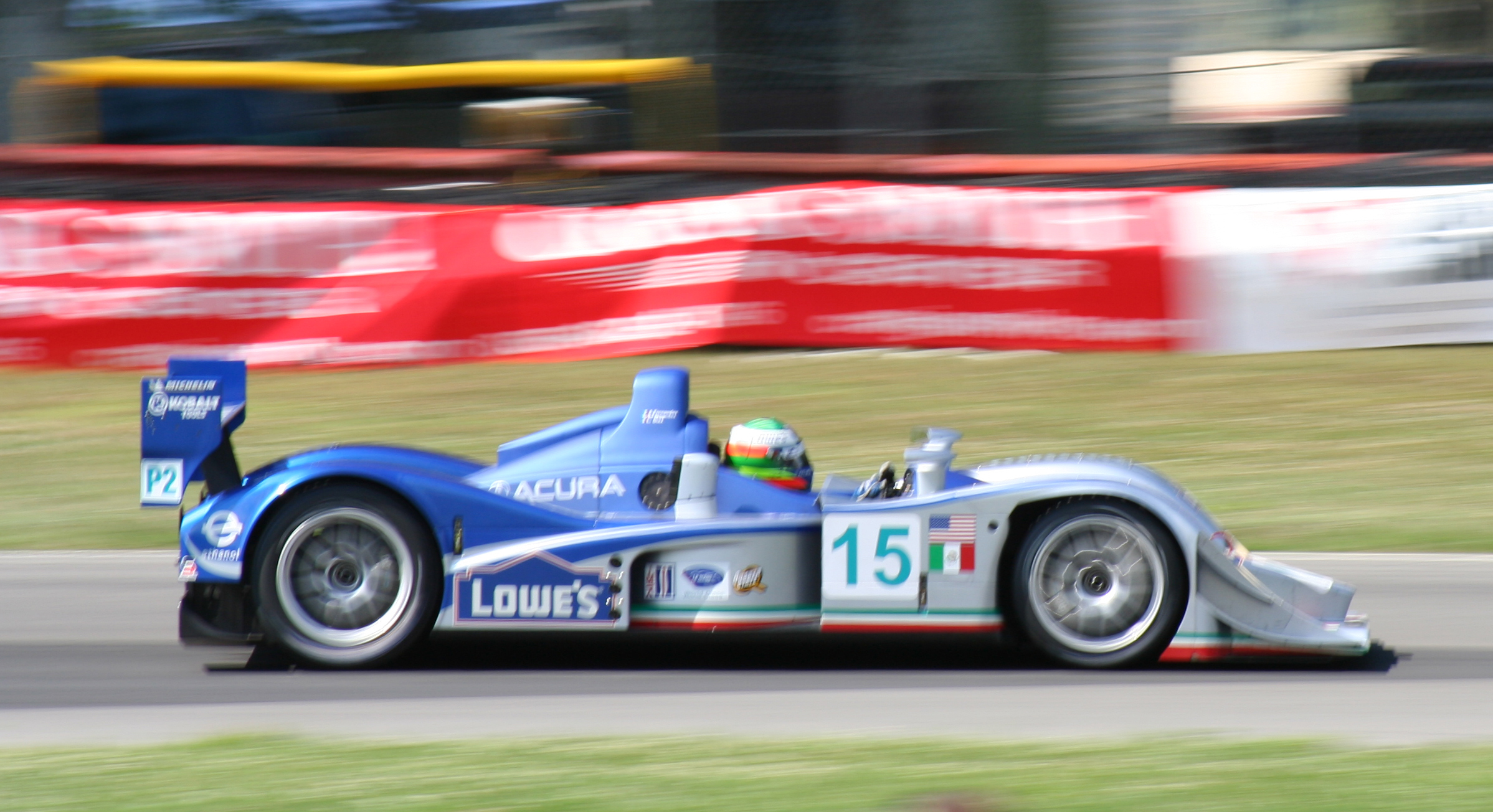
Fernández's Lowe's-sponsored Lola B06/43-Acura at Mid-Ohio.

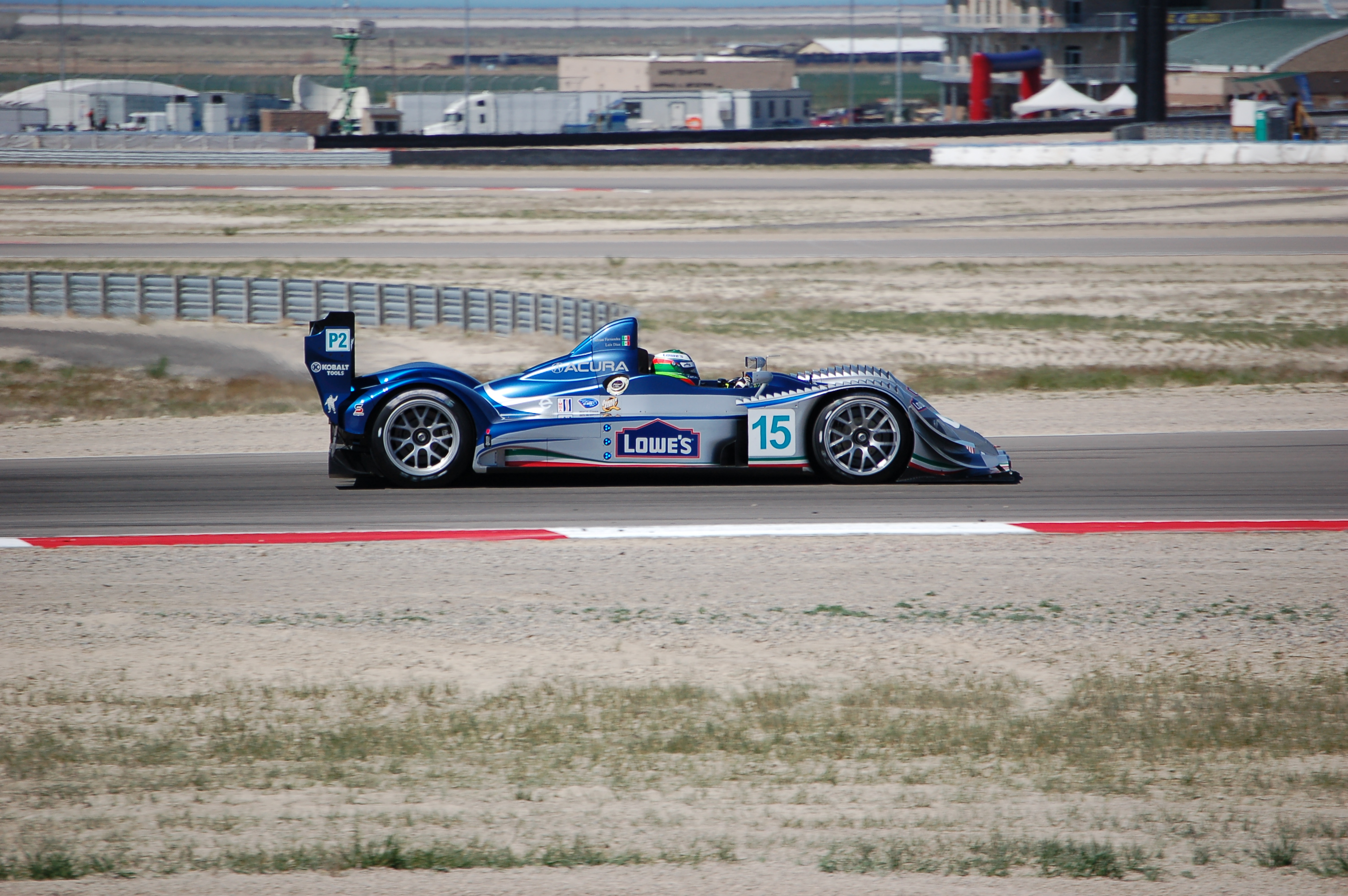
Fernández Racing's Acura ARX-01b at Miller Motorsports Park.

In 2007, Fernández Racing became one of three factory supported teams in Acura's new LMP2 project in the American Le Mans Series. Fernández was chosen as the primary engine development team. Through the 2007 season, the team ran a Lola B07/40 chassis, with Highcroft Racing and Andretti Green Racing running heavily modified Courage chassis in order to compare the engine's performance relative to other Lola teams. In the team's ALMS debut at the 2007 12 Hours of Sebring, drivers Adrian Fernández and Luis Díaz finished third overall and second in the LMP2 class, behind the Andretti-Green Acura. After a strong start to the 2008 season for Acura, the Penske Racing Porsche RS Spyders would dominate the rest of the season claiming the next eleven races including eight overall victories. The team finished their debut season fourth in the LMP2 Teams' Championship with Fernández and Díaz eleventh in the Drivers' Championship.

For 2008, the team raced the updated Courage-derived Acura ARX-01b just as the other Acura teams. The 2008 season saw titanic battle between the LMP2 Acura and Porsche teams, and the LMP1 Factory Audi Sport North America team. Despite their consistent pace, the team's best result came as a second place at Mosport. The team finished the season 5th in the LMP2 Teams' Championship with Adrian Fernández and Luis Díaz 12th in the Drivers' Championship.

In 2009, Highcroft Racing and de Ferran Motorsports moved up to the LMP1 class, leaving Fernández Racing as the only Acura team in LMP2. By season's end, the team finished first in the P2 Teams' Championship ahead of their main rival Dyson Racing with Fernández and Díaz first in the Drivers' Championship. 2009 would be the final season of competition for the Fernández Racing with the team leaving American Le Mans Series competition. However, HPD would continue to develop the ARX line of LMP1 and LMP2 prototypes.

== Drivers ==
=== CART ===
- (Mexico) Adrian Fernández
- (Japan) Shinji Nakano
- (Italy) Max Papis
- (Mexico) Luis Díaz (2 races)

=== IRL IndyCar Series ===
- (United States) Scott Sharp
- (Japan) Kosuke Matsuura
- (Mexico) Adrian Fernández

=== Grand-Am/ALMS ===
- (Mexico) Adrian Fernández (Grand Am & ALMS 2006-)
- (Brazil) Mario Haberfeld (Grand-Am)
- (Mexico) Luis Díaz (ALMS 2007-)

== Racing results ==
=== Complete CART FedEx Championship Series results ===
(key) (results in bold indicate pole position) (results in italics indicate fastest lap)

Year	Chassis	Engine	Tyres	Drivers	No.	1	2	3	4	5	6	7	8	9	10	11	12	13	14	15	16	17	18	19	20	21	Pts Pos	Pts
2001						MTY	LBH	TEX	NAZ	MOT	MIL	DET	POR	CLE	TOR	MCH	CHI	MOH	ROA	VAN	LAU	ROC	HOU	LAG	SRF	FON		
2001	Reynard 01i	Honda HR-1 V8t	F	(Mexico) Adrián Fernández	51	19	16	C^{1}	19	16	5	12	19	21	3	25	10	22	3	21	24	23	14	10	19	18	18th	45
2001	Reynard 01i	Honda HR-1 V8t	F	(Japan) Shinji Nakano	52	18	12	C^{1}	15	8	16	13	22	22	9	22	16	18	15	14	22	17	15	21	12	21	26th	11
2002						MTY	LBH	MOT	MIL	LAG	POR	CHI	TOR	CLE	VAN	MOH	ROA	MTL	DEN	ROC	MIA	SFR	FON	MXC				
2002	Lola B02/00	Honda HR-2 V8t	B	(Mexico) Adrián Fernández	51	**13**	10	7	**2**	18	14	13	9	11	8		18	12	4	14	7	DNS					14th	59
2002	Lola B02/00	Honda HR-2 V8t	B	(Italy) Max Papis	51											15							14				19th	32
2002	Lola B02/00	Honda HR-2 V8t	B	(Mexico) Luis Díaz	51																			19			23rd	0
2002	Lola B02/00	Honda HR-2 V8t	B	(Japan) Shinji Nakano	52	15	12	10	18	14	11	5	4	10	11	9	11	9	16	16	14	13	15	14			17th	43
2003						STP	MTY	LBH	BRH	LAU	MIL	LAG	POR	CLE	TOR	VAN	ROA	MOH	MTL	DEN	MIA	MXC	SFR					
2003	Lola B02/00	Ford XFE V8t	B	(Mexico) Adrián Fernández	51	15	4	2	12	15	6	7	1	11	9	12	12	7	8	5	**8***	8	12				8th	105

1. The Firestone Firehawk 600 was canceled after qualifying due to excessive g-forces on the drivers.

=== Complete IRL IndyCar Series results ===
(key)

Year	Chassis	Engine	Tyres	Drivers	No.	1	2	3	4	5	6	7	8	9	10	11	12	13	14	15	16	17	Pts Pos	Pts
2003						HMS	PHX	MOT	INDY	TXS	PPIR	RIR	KAN	NSH	MCH	GAT	KTY	NAZ	CHI	FON	TXS			
2003	Dallara IR-03	Honda HI3R V8	F	(United States) Roger Yasukawa	55	14	17	21	10	9	17	11	7	15	8	18	12	8	8	7	10		12th	301
2004						HMS	PHX	MOT	INDY	TXS	RIR	KAN	NSH	MIL	MCH	KTY	PPIR	NAZ	CHI	FON	TXS			
2004	G-Force GF09B	Honda HI4R V8	F	(Mexico) Adrián Fernández	5		20	18	7	5	7	6	10	8	12	1	2	7	1*	1	5		5th	445
2004	G-Force GF09B	Honda HI4R V8	F	(Japan) Kosuke Matsuura	55	11	11	8	11	16	14	18	9	10	17	4	13	21	21	13	19		14th	280
2005						HMS	PHX	STP	MOT	INDY	TXS	RIR	KAN	NSH	MIL	MCH	KTY	PPIR	SNM	CHI	WGL	FON		
2005	Panoz GF09C	Honda HI5R V8	F	(Mexico) Adrián Fernández	5					14													29th	16
2005	Panoz GF09C	Honda HI5R V8	F	(United States) Scott Sharp	8	13	5	18	2	7	4	17	6	4	10	7	1	9	12	8	9	4	5th	444
2005	Panoz GF09C	Honda HI5R V8	F	(Japan) Kosuke Matsuura	55	12	10	13	9	17	7	9	20	14	11	16	8	13	6	23	6	19	14th	320
2006						HMS	STP	MOT	INDY	WGL	TXS	RIR	KAN	NSH	MIL	MCH	KTY	SNM	CHI					
2006	Dallara IR-05; Panoz GF09C	Honda HI6R V8	F	(United States) Scott Sharp	8	7	10	16	9	9	5	5	18	17	12	6	16	14	9				12th	287
2006	Dallara IR-05; Panoz GF09C	Honda HI6R V8	F	(Japan) Kosuke Matsuura	55	6	7	7	15	18	8	12	8	13	17	9	19	13	11				13th	273

== IndyCar wins ==
#	Season	Date	Sanction	Track / Race	No.	Winning driver	Chassis	Engine	Tire	Grid	Laps Led
1	2003	June 22	CART	Portland International Raceway (R)	51	(Mexico) Adrián Fernández	Lola B02/00	Ford XFE V8t	Bridgestone	3	15
2	2004	August 15	IRL	Kentucky Speedway (O)	5	(Mexico) Adrián Fernández (2)	G-Force GF09B	Honda HI4R V8	Firestone	4	51
3	2004	September 12	IRL	Chicagoland Speedway (O)	5	(Mexico) Adrián Fernández (3)	G-Force GF09B	Honda HI4R V8	Firestone	10	83
4	2004	October 3	IRL	Auto Club Speedway (O)	5	(Mexico) Adrián Fernández (4)	G-Force GF09B	Honda HI4R V8	Firestone	4	18
5	2005	August 14	IRL	Kentucky Speedway (O)	8	(United States) Scott Sharp	Panoz G-Force GF09C	Honda HI5R V8	Firestone	7	60
