= Shinji Nakano =

Japanese racing driver (born 1971)

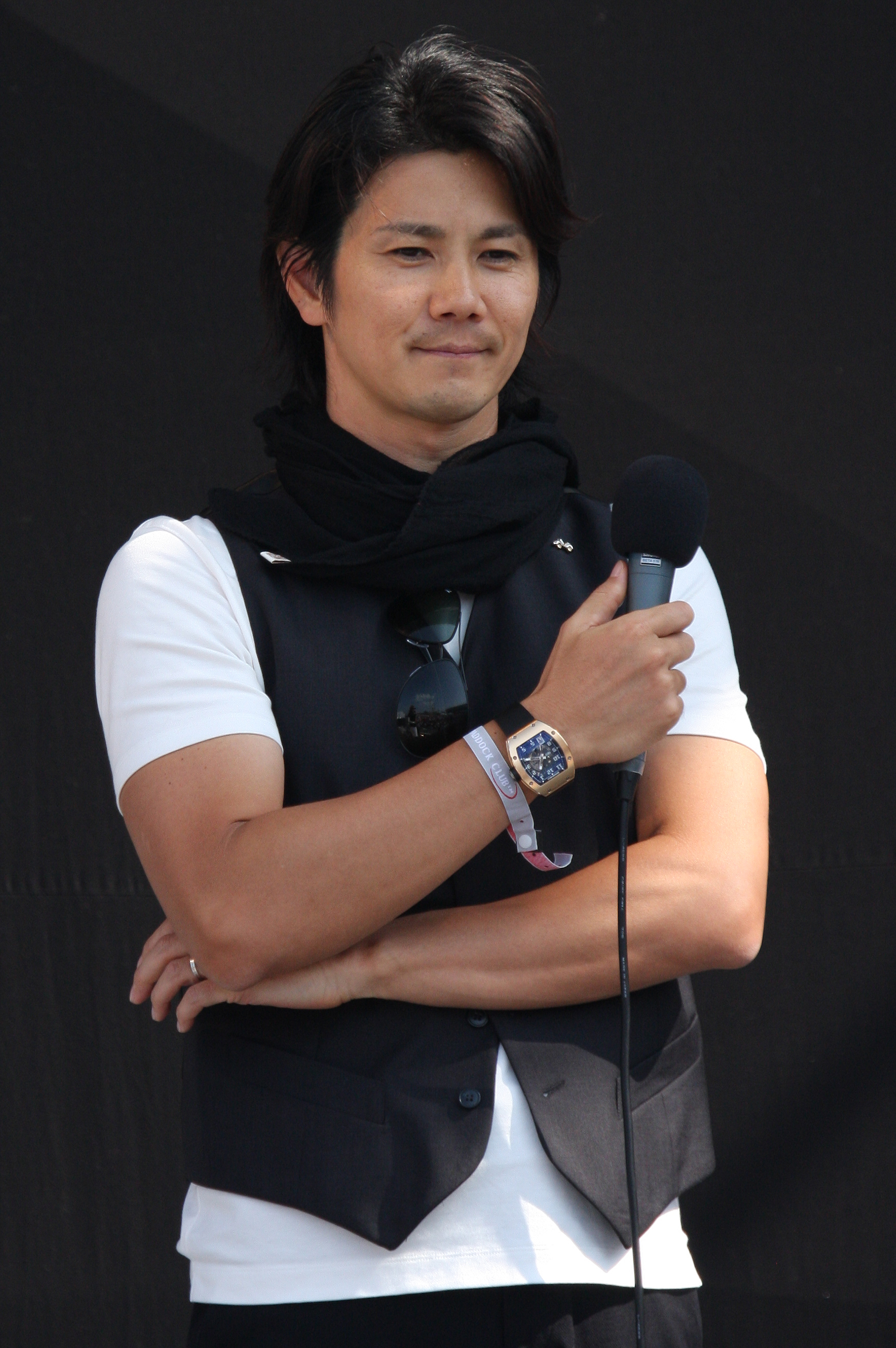
- Nakano in 2009
- Born: 1 April 1971 (age 55); Takatsuki, Osaka, Japan

Formula One World Championship career
- Nationality: (Japan) Japanese
- Active years: 1997–1998
- Team(s): Prost, Minardi, Jordan (Test Driver)
- Entries: 33
- Championships: 0
- Wins: 0
- Podiums: 0
- Career points: 2
- Pole positions: 0
- Fastest laps: 0
- First entry: 1997 Australian Grand Prix
- Last entry: 1998 Japanese Grand Prix

24 Hours of Le Mans career
- Years: 2005–2008, 2011–2014, 2016
- Teams: Courage Compétition, Creation Autosportif, Epsilon Euskadi, OAK Racing
- Best finish: 14th (2011)
- Class wins: 0
- Categorisation: FIA Platinum

Shinji Nakano (中野 信治, born 1 April 1971) is a Japanese professional racing driver.

Nakano's father, Tsuneharu, was also a racing driver. He competed in the All-Japan Formula Three Championship.

== Formula One career ==
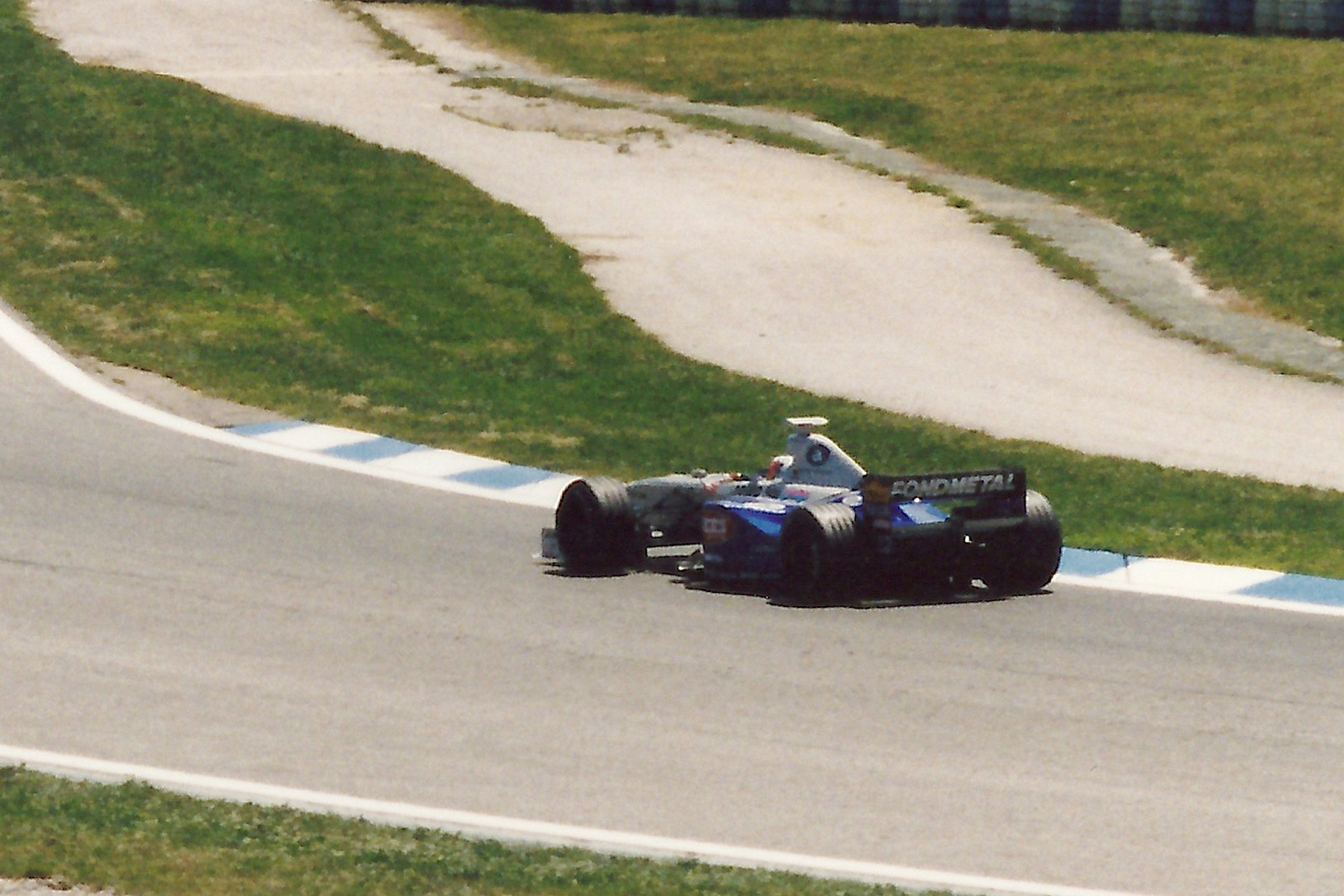
Nakano in the 1998 Spanish Grand Prix, driving a Minardi.

Nakano made his debut at the 1997 Australian Grand Prix in Melbourne for the Prost Grand Prix team, owned by legendary four times Formula One World Champion Alain Prost. The 1997 season saw him score two world championship points with a pair of sixth places.

With his place at Prost heavily reliant on their engine partners Mugen-Honda, Nakano was dropped in favour of Jarno Trulli, with the second cockpit taken by Olivier Panis, when Prost switched to Peugeot engines. He subsequently joined Minardi for the 1998 season, alongside Esteban Tuero.

Nakano struggled in the under-powered, under-financed Italian team. He failed to score any points in 1998 and bowed out of Formula One racing for good at his home Grand Prix at Suzuka, Japan, having contested a total of 33 Grands Prix. He spent 1999 as an occasional test driver for the Jordan team, which also used Mugen-Honda engines.

== After Formula One ==
After Formula One, Nakano went to race in CART for Walker Racing and Fernandez Racing. He made 56 starts from 2000 to 2002 with a best points finish of seventeenth in 2002 and a best race result of fourth at the 2002 Molson Indy Toronto. He also started fifteenth in the 2003 Indianapolis 500 for Beck Motorsports, finishing fourteenth. He competed in the 2006 and 2008 24 Hours of Le Mans races and returned to the event in 2011 with OAK Racing and 2012 with the Boutsen Ginon squad.

== Helmet ==
Nakano's helmet was black with a black circle on the top surrounded by a white halo, with a red and silver flame design surrounding the visor and a black and silver checkered flag behind of it, in CART he changed the black for white, the halo became blue, the black circle became red, the checkered flag disappeared and the flame became red with blue outline. in Le Mans, he added more flames in the point where the checkered flag was.

== Media appearances ==
Since 2016, Nakano has served as a commentator on Formula One races for DAZN Japan. He was a guest on the TV Asahi variety programme Aruaru Gijido in March 2017.

== Career statistics ==
=== Pre-Formula One career summary ===
Year	Series	Team	Pos.
1986	All Japan Karting Championship		9th
1987	All Japan Karting Championship		**2nd**
1987	International Kart Grand Prix		**1st**
1988	All Japan Karting Championship		**3rd**
1989	Japanese Formula Three		7th
1990	Formula Vauxhall Lotus		5th
1990	Formula Opel Lotus		17th
1991	Formula Opel Lotus		12th
1992	Japanese Formula Three		24th
1992	Japanese Formula 3000	Nakajima Racing	NC
1993	Japanese Formula Three		5th
1994	Japanese Formula Three		**3rd**
1994	Japanese Formula 3000	Team Nova / Nakajima racing	NC
1995	Japanese Formula 3000	Speed Star Wheel Racing	11th
1996	Formula Nippon	Team Dome Mugen	6th

=== Complete Japanese Formula 3000/Formula Nippon results ===
(key) (Races in bold indicate pole position; races in italics indicate fastest lap)

Year	Entrant	1	2	3	4	5	6	7	8	9	10	11	DC	Points
1992	Nakajima Racing	SUZ; DNQ	FUJ; 12	MIN; Ret	SUZ; DNQ	AUT; Ret	SUG; Ret	FUJ; 12	FUJ; 13	SUZ; 14	FUJ; 16	SUZ; 9	NC	0
1994	Team Nova	SUZ	FUJ	MIN	SUZ	SUG	FUJ	SUZ; Ret	FUJ	FUJ			NC	0
1994	Nakajima Racing										SUZ; Ret		NC	0
1995	Speed Star Wheel Racing	SUZ; Ret	FUJ; C	MIN; 7	SUZ; Ret	SUG; 3	FUJ; Ret	TOK; 5	FUJ; 9	SUZ; 8			11th	6
1996	Team DomeMugen	SUZ; 2	MIN; 13	FUJ; Ret	TOK; 9	SUZ; 6	SUG; 7	FUJ; 3	MIN; 2	SUZ; 9	FUJ; 4		6th	20

=== Complete Formula One results ===
(key)

Year	Team	Chassis	Engine	1	2	3	4	5	6	7	8	9	10	11	12	13	14	15	16	17	WDC	Points
1997	Prost Gauloises Blondes	Prost JS45	Mugen-Honda MF-301HB 3.0 V10	AUS; 7	BRA; 14	ARG; Ret	SMR; Ret	MON; Ret	ESP; Ret	CAN; 6	FRA; Ret	GBR; 11^{†}	GER; 7	HUN; 6	BEL; Ret	ITA; 11	AUT; Ret	LUX; Ret	JPN; Ret	EUR; 10	18th	2
1998	Fondmetal Minardi Team SpA	Minardi M198	Ford JD Zetec-R 3.0 V10	AUS; Ret	BRA; Ret	ARG; 13	SMR; Ret	ESP; 14	MON; 9	CAN; 7	FRA; 17^{†}	GBR; 8	AUT; 11	GER; Ret	HUN; 15	BEL; 8	ITA; Ret	LUX; 15	JPN; Ret		18th	0

^{†} Driver did not finish the Grand Prix, but was classified as they had completed over 90% of the race distance.

=== Complete American Open-Wheel Racing results ===
(key)

==== CART ====
Year	Team	No.	Chassis	Engine	1	2	3	4	5	6	7	8	9	10	11	12	13	14	15	16	17	18	19	20	21	Rank	Points	Ref
2000	Walker Racing	5	Reynard 2Ki	Honda HR-0 V8t	MIA; 8	LBH	RIO	MOT; 14	NZR; Wth	MIL; 23	DET; 15	POR; 11	CLE; 15	TOR; 14	MIS; 20	CHI; 13	MDO; 19	ROA; 22	VAN; 19	LS; 26	STL; 21	HOU; 8	SRF; 21	FON; 16		**24th**	**12**	
2001	Fernández Racing	52	Reynard 01i	Honda HR-1 V8t	MTY; 18	LBH; 12	TXS; NH	NZR; 15	MOT; 8	MIL; 16	DET; 13	POR; 22	CLE; 22	TOR; 9	MIS; 22	CHI; 16	MDO; 18	ROA; 15	VAN; 14	LAU; 22	ROC; 17	HOU; 15	LS; 21	SRF; 12	FON; 21	**26th**	**11**	
2002	Fernández Racing	52	Lola B02/00	Honda HR-2 V8t	MTY; 15	LBH; 12	MOT; 10	MIL; 18	LS; 14	POR; 11	CHI; 5	TOR; 4	CLE; 10	VAN; 11	MDO; 9	ROA; 11	MTL; 9	DEN; 16	ROC; 16	MIA; 14	SRF; 13	FON; 15	MXC; 14			**17th**	**43**	

==== IRL IndyCar Series ====
Year	Team	No.	Chassis	Engine	1	2	3	4	5	6	7	8	9	10	11	12	13	14	15	16	Rank	Points	Ref
2003	Beck Motorsports	54	Dallara IR-03	Honda	HMS	PHX	MOT; 11	INDY; 14	TXS	PPIR	RIR	KAN	NSH	MIS	STL	KTY	NZR	CHI	FON	TX2	**29th**	**35**	

=== Complete JGTC results ===
(key) (Races in bold indicate pole position) (Races in italics indicate fastest lap)

Year	Team	Car	Class	1	2	3	4	5	6	7	DC	Points
2004	Team Kunimitsu with Mooncraft	Honda NSX	GT500	TAI; Ret	SUG; 8	SEP; 15	TOK; 10	MOT; 9	AUT; 10	SUZ; 9	13th	9

=== 24 Hours of Le Mans results ===
Year	Team	Co-Drivers	Car	Class	Laps	Pos.	Class Pos.
2005	(France) Courage Compétition	(France) Jonathan Cochet (France) Bruce Jouanny	Courage C60H-Judd	LMP1	52	DNF	DNF
2006	(France) Courage Compétition	(France) Jean-Marc Gounon (Japan) Haruki Kurosawa	Courage LC70-Mugen	LMP1	35	DNF	DNF
2007	(United Kingdom) Creation Autosportif Ltd.	(United Kingdom) Jamie Campbell-Walter (Switzerland) Felipe Ortiz	Creation CA07-Judd	LMP1	55	DNF	DNF
2008	(Spain) Epsilon Euskadi	(Sweden) Stefan Johansson (France) Jean-Marc Gounon	Epsilon Euskadi EE1-Judd	LMP1	158	DNF	DNF
2011	(France) OAK Racing	(Belgium) Nicolas de Crem (Czech Republic) Jan Charouz	OAK Pescarolo 01 Evo-Judd	LMP2	313	14th	5th
2012	(Belgium) Boutsen Ginion Racing	(France) Bastien Brière (Germany) Jens Petersen	Oreca 03-Nissan	LMP2	325	24th	10th
2013	(United Kingdom) Delta-ADR	(Thailand) Tor Graves (United Kingdom) Archie Hamilton	Oreca 03-Nissan	LMP2	101	DNF	DNF
2014	(Japan) Team Taisan	(United Kingdom) Martin Rich (Germany) Pierre Ehret	Ferrari 458 Italia GT2	GTE; Am	327	28th	8th
2016	(Switzerland) Race Performance	(Switzerland) Nicolas Leutwiler (United Kingdom) James Winslow	Oreca 03R-Judd	LMP2	289	44th	17th

=== Complete FIA World Endurance Championship results ===
Year	Entrant	Class	Car	Engine	1	2	3	4	5	6	7	8	9	Rank	Points
2012	ADR-Delta	LMP2	Oreca 03	Nissan VK45DE 4.5 L V8	SEB	SPA	LMS	SIL	SÃO	BHR	FUJ; 8	SHA		41st	4
2013	ADR-Delta	LMP2	Oreca 03	Nissan VK45DE 4.5 L V8	SIL	SPA	LMS; Ret	SÃO	COA	FUJ; 4	SHA	BHR		26th	6
2016	Manor	LMP2	Oreca 05	Nissan VK45DE 4.5 L V8	SIL	SPA	LMS	NÜR	MEX	COA	FUJ; 11	SHA	BHR	32nd	0.5
