= Sigma Autosport =

Racing team

Sigma Autosport was a CART Champ Car racing team that competed in 2001 and 2002. It was owned by former Toyota Atlantic driver Tom Wieringa.

Sigma competed in the 2001 CART season with driver Oriol Servià. Servià finished 19th in points with two fifth-place finishes. In the off-season, Wieringa drove in a test himself on the Homestead-Miami Speedway road course. For the 2002 CART season, Sigma hired veteran Max Papis, who had recently been let go from Team Rahal. The team reportedly missed a payment to engine supplier Cosworth and was forced to miss a practice session at the Long Beach Grand Prix, the second race of the season. In the sixth race of the season, the team was again in arrears to Cosworth and was denied an engine and the team was forced to miss the race. The team shut down shortly thereafter, reporting that the reason was that several of their sponsors had failed to make their agreed payments to the team. Papis sat sixth in points after his last race start at Laguna Seca, having scored third-place finishes at Long Beach and the Milwaukee Mile. He finished the season in 19th after making two starts later in the season for Fernandez Racing.

The team also fielded a Toyota Atlantic car for Tom Wieringa's son David, who completed the 2002 season with the team finishing 16th in points with a best finish of tenth at Toronto.

Tom Wieringa later appeared competing in the Indy Pro Series/Indy Lights, competing in sixteen races from 2006 to 2008, primarily competing for Guthrie Racing rather than his own team.

== Complete CART FedEx Championship Series results ==
(key) (results in bold indicate pole position) (results in italics indicate fastest lap)

Year	Chassis	Engine	Tyres	Drivers	No.	1	2	3	4	5	6	7	8	9	10	11	12	13	14	15	16	17	18	19	20	21	Pts Pos	Pts
2001						MTY	LBH	TEX	NAZ	MOT	MIL	DET	POR	CLE	TOR	MCH	CHI	MDO	ROA	VAN	LAU	ROC	HOU	LAG	SRF	FON		
2001	Lola B1/00	Ford XF V8t	**F**	(Spain) Oriol Servià	22	14	14	C	9	14	14	16	9	17	23	11	18	9	10	5	5	10	26	17	25	11	19th	**42**
2002						MTY	LBH	MOT	MIL	LAG	POR	CHI	TOR	CLE	VAN	MDO	ROA	MTL	DEN	ROC	MIA	SFR	FON	MXC				
2002	Lola B2/00	Ford XF V8t	**B**	(Italy) Max Papis	22	9	3	18	3	13																	19th	**32**
