= Indy Japan 300 =

Grand Prix circuit

IndyCar Series
- Venue: Twin Ring Motegi
- First race: 1998
- First IRL race: 2003
- Last race: 2011
- Distance: 304 miles (489 km)
- Laps: 200
- Previous names: Fuji 200 (1966); Budweiser 500k (1998); Firestone Firehawk 500k (1999–2001); Bridgestone Potenza 500k (2002); Indy Japan 300 (2003-2010); Indy Japan: The Final (2011)

The Indy Japan 300 presented by Bridgestone was an Indy Racing League IndyCar Series race held at Twin Ring Motegi in Motegi, Japan. The 2008 race marked the historic first ever win for a woman driver in American open-wheel racing when Danica Patrick of Andretti-Green Racing took the checkered flag.

The first American open-wheel race in Japan was held in 1966 at Fuji Speedway. Jackie Stewart won the Fuji Japan 200, which was held as an exhibition race, and no championship points were awarded. USAC did not return.

For a short period in the late 1980s and early 1990s the CART series explored the prospects of holding a race in Japan. Possible locations would be either Suzuka, Fuji, or a street course in another city. The FIA objected, citing conflicts with Formula One and other interests. In addition, rules were put into place requiring that any CART race outside of North America be held on an oval. Despite the objections, in 1991 CART made their first trip across the Pacific Ocean, and held a street race at Surfer's Paradise, Australia. The plans for a race in Japan were scrapped.

In 1994, Honda joined the CART series, and by 1996, was widely successful. Interest in holding a race in Japan resurfaced, and upon the completion of the Twin Ring Motegi oval, a race was first held in 1998 without FIA objection. The race continued as a CART event through 2002. In 2003, Honda switched alliances to the Indy Racing League, and the race became an IndyCar Series event. On February 9, 2011, it was announced that the series would not return to Motegi for the 2012 season.

== Scheduling ==
From 2003 to 2006, the race marked the final IRL race before the Indianapolis 500. The extended travel time required typically found the race held the weekend before or after Easter, leaving one or two weeks of travel and rest time until practice began at Indianapolis in early May. This situation was widely unpopular for fans, and for television, because it left a large gap in the schedule, and disrupted continuity leading to the series' premier event. In 2007, the race at Kansas Speedway was moved immediately after Motegi to be the race preceding the Indianapolis 500.

In 2008, following the open wheel unification, the race served as part of the unique "doubleheader" weekend with the Grand Prix of Long Beach. Existing IRL teams raced at Motegi, and former Champ Car teams raced at Long Beach. For 2009, in an effort to reorganize the IndyCar schedule, the race was moved to September (swapping with the MotoGP event) on the Respect-for-the-Aged Day and autumnal equinox public holidays, also kept for 2010.

Following the 2011 earthquake and tsunami in Japan, it was announced that the 2011 event would be moved to the 2.98 mile road course (used by MotoGP but utilized oval pit lane rather than traditional pit lane due to lack of room) due to damage to the oval. The 2011 event was the final running, a decision made before, and unrelated to, the earthquake and tsunami.

== Past winners ==
Season	Date	Driver	Team	Chassis	Engine	Race Distance		Race Time	Average Speed (mph)	Report	Refs
Season	Date	Driver	Team	Chassis	Engine	Laps	Miles (km)	Race Time	Average Speed (mph)	Report	Refs
CART/Champ Car history
1998	March 28	(Mexico) Adrian Fernández	Patrick Racing	Reynard	Ford-Cosworth	201	311.349 (501.067)	1:57:12	159.393	Report	
1999	April 10	(Mexico) Adrian Fernández	Patrick Racing	Reynard	Ford-Cosworth	201	311.349 (501.067)	1:46:01	176.195	Report	
2000	May 13	(United States) Michael Andretti	Newman/Haas Racing	Lola	Ford-Cosworth	201	311.349 (501.067)	1:58:52	157.154	Report	
2001	May 19	(Sweden) Kenny Bräck	Team Rahal	Lola	Ford-Cosworth	201	311.349 (501.067)	1:44:48	178.113	Report	
2002	April 27	(Brazil) Bruno Junqueira	Chip Ganassi Racing	Lola	Toyota	201	311.349 (501.067)	2:00:05	155.447	Report	
IRL/IndyCar Series history
2003	April 13	(United States) Scott Sharp	Kelley Racing	Dallara	Toyota	200	309.8 (498.574)	2:21:18	129.09	Report	
2004	April 16	(United Kingdom) Dan Wheldon	Andretti Green Racing	Dallara	Honda	200	309.8 (498.574)	1:49:48	166.114	Report	
2005	April 30	(United Kingdom) Dan Wheldon	Andretti Green Racing	Dallara	Honda	200	309.8 (498.574)	2:16:46	133.365	Report	
2006	April 22	(Brazil) Hélio Castroneves	Penske Racing	Dallara	Honda	200	309.8 (498.574)	1:59:01	153.248	Report	
2007	April 21	(Brazil) Tony Kanaan	Andretti Green Racing	Dallara	Honda	200	309.8 (498.574)	1:52:23	162.295	Report	
2008	April 20	(United States) Danica Patrick	Andretti Green Racing	Dallara	Honda	200	309.8 (498.574)	1:51:03	164.258	Report	
2009	September 19	(New Zealand) Scott Dixon	Chip Ganassi Racing	Dallara	Honda	200	309.8 (498.574)	1:51:38	163.401	Report	
2010	September 18	(Brazil) Hélio Castroneves	Penske Racing	Dallara	Honda	200	309.8 (498.574)	2:04:04	147.008	Report	
2011	September 17	(New Zealand) Scott Dixon	Chip Ganassi Racing	Dallara	Honda	63	187.929 (302.442)	1:56:41	96.635	Report	

=== Notes ===
- Qualifying record: Gil de Ferran, 219.000 mph (359.606 km/h), 1999
- Race record: Kenny Brack, 178.113 mph (292.468 km/h), 2001
- 2008: Held on same day as Long Beach Grand Prix due to scheduling conflict as a result of reunification.
- 2011: Race held on road course due to track damage on the oval from the earthquake.

== See also ==
- Japanese Grand Prix
