= 2002 CART FedEx Championship Series =

American motorsport season

2002 CART season
- FedEx Championship Series

Season
- Races: ~~20~~ 19
- Start date: March 10
- End date: November 17

Awards
- Drivers' champion: (Brazil) Cristiano da Matta
- Constructors' Cup: (United Kingdom) Lola
- Manufacturers' Cup: (Japan) Toyota
- Nations' Cup: Brazil
- Rookie of the Year: (Mexico) Mario Domínguez

The 2002 FedEx Championship Series season, the twenty-fourth in the Championship Auto Racing Teams (CART) era of American open-wheel car racing, consisted of 19 races, beginning in Monterrey, Mexico on March 10 and concluding in Mexico City on November 17. The FedEx Championship Series Drivers' Champion was Cristiano da Matta. Rookie of the Year was Mario Domínguez.

Sports television channel ESPN dropped CART coverage for the 2002 season. CBS and Speed Channel took its place for two seasons. This reflected a continued decline for the series in a year saw which saw the German 500 cancelled due to the fact the planned host venue for that round, Eurospeedway Lausitz was at that time suffering from financial problems, as well as a controversial round at Surfers Paradise where two drivers (Adrián Fernández and Toranosuke Takagi) were injured in a start crash and as well as there being some contentious decisions from race officials in relation to the running of that race particularly regarding its conclusion. In addition Chip Ganassi Racing would withdraw from the CART series at the end of the season just as Team Penske had done at the end of the season prior, with the Ganassi operation choosing to completely defect to the IRL from 2003 onwards having run entries in concurrently in CART and the IRL during 2002. Michael Andretti would also complete a buyout of Team Green with that team also defecting to the rival IRL series for 2003. In a further financial blow to the series, freight company FedEx which had been title sponsor of the CART series since the 1998 season ended their title sponsorship deal with CART at the end of the year. Engine manufacturers Honda and Toyota would also pull out of CART and move across to the IRL at the end of the season leaving Ford-Cosworth as the sole engine supplier for 2003. Cosworth would remain the sole supplier for the series ( which be formally rebranded as the Champ Car World Series from 2004 to 2007) until the series ended following the reunification of American-open wheel racing in 2008.

== Drivers and teams ==
Bridgestone became the exclusive tire supplier for CART, replacing Firestone, an association that would continue until the final Champ Car season in 2007. The 2002 season was the last to feature multiple engine manufacturers.

The following teams and drivers competed in the 2002 CART Championship Series season.

Team	Chassis	Engine	No	Drivers	Races	Primary Sponsors
(United States) Target Chip Ganassi Racing	Lola B02/00	Toyota	4	(Brazil) Bruno Junqueira	All	Target; Coors Light 1
(United States) Target Chip Ganassi Racing	Lola B02/00	Toyota	12	(Sweden) Kenny Bräck	All	Target; Coors Light 1
(United States) Target Chip Ganassi Racing	Lola B02/00	Toyota	44	(New Zealand) Scott Dixon	4–19	Target; Coors Light 1
(United States) Walker Racing	Reynard 02i	Toyota	5	(Japan) Toranosuke Takagi	All	Pioneer
(United States) Newman/Haas Racing	Lola B02/00	Toyota	6	(Brazil) Cristiano da Matta	All	Havoline 12; Chevron 7
(United States) Newman/Haas Racing	Lola B02/00	Toyota	11	(Brazil) Christian Fittipaldi	All	Eli Lilly
(United States) PWR Championship Racing	Lola B02/00	Toyota	7	(New Zealand) Scott Dixon	1–3	PWR Championship Racing
(United States) PWR Championship Racing	Lola B02/00	Toyota	17	(Spain) Oriol Servià	1–3	Air Eight
(United States) Team Rahal	Lola B02/00	Ford-Cosworth	8	(United States) Jimmy Vasser	All	Shell
(United States) Team Rahal	Lola B02/00	Ford-Cosworth	9	(Mexico) Michel Jourdain Jr.	All	Gigante
(United States) Mo Nunn Racing	Reynard 02i	Honda	10	(Brazil) Tony Kanaan	1–3	Pioneer
(United States) Mo Nunn Racing	Lola B02/00	Honda	10	(Brazil) Tony Kanaan	4–19	Pioneer
(Mexico) Herdez Competition	Lola B02/00	Ford-Cosworth	16	(Mexico) Mario Domínguez R	1–4	Herdez
(Mexico) Herdez Competition	Lola B02/00	Ford-Cosworth	55	(Mexico) Mario Domínguez R	5–19	Herdez
(United Kingdom) Team St. George (United States) Dale Coyne Racing	Lola B02/00	Ford-Cosworth	19	(United Kingdom) Darren Manning R	15	RAC AutoWindscreens
(United Kingdom) Team St. George (United States) Dale Coyne Racing	Lola B02/00	Ford-Cosworth	19	(Germany) André Lotterer R	19	J.A.G. Sports
(United States) Patrick Racing	Reynard 02i	Toyota	20	(United States) Townsend Bell R	1–9	Visteon
(United States) Patrick Racing	Reynard 02i	Toyota	20	(Spain) Oriol Servià	10–19	Visteon
(United States) Sigma Autosport	Lola B02/00	Ford-Cosworth	22	(Italy) Max Papis	1–5	Rockwell FirstPoint
(United States) Team KOOL Green	Reynard 02i	Honda	26	(Canada) Paul Tracy	1–2	KOOL 18; Team Green 1
(United States) Team KOOL Green	Lola B02/00	Honda	26	(Canada) Paul Tracy	3–19	KOOL 18; Team Green 1
(United States) Team KOOL Green	Reynard 02i	Honda	27	(United Kingdom) Dario Franchitti	1–3	KOOL 18; Team Green 1
(United States) Team KOOL Green	Lola B02/00	Honda	27	(United Kingdom) Dario Franchitti	4–19	KOOL 18; Team Green 1
(United States) Team Motorola	Reynard 02i	Honda	39	(United States) Michael Andretti	1–2	Motorola
(United States) Team Motorola	Lola B02/00	Honda	39	(United States) Michael Andretti	3–19	Motorola
(United States) Team Player's	Reynard 02i	Ford-Cosworth	32	(Canada) Patrick Carpentier	All	Player's 18; It's Your World 1
(United States) Team Player's	Reynard 02i	Ford-Cosworth	33	(Canada) Alex Tagliani	All	Player's 18; It's Your World 1
(Mexico) Fernández Racing	Lola B02/00	Honda	51	(Mexico) Adrián Fernández	1–10, 12–17	Tecate
(Mexico) Fernández Racing	Lola B02/00	Honda	51	(Italy) Max Papis	11, 18	Tecate
(Mexico) Fernández Racing	Lola B02/00	Honda	51	(Mexico) Luis Díaz R	19	Tecate
(Mexico) Fernández Racing	Lola B02/00	Honda	52	(Japan) Shinji Nakano	All	Alpine

R Eligible for Rookie of the Year

=== Team changes ===
The biggest change to the team lineup in the 2002 CART season was the defection of Team Penske to the rival Indy Racing League. The departure of Team Penske, a CART stalwart from its earliest days, was an early sign of a major shift in the CART-IRL rivalry. Several other major CART powers would follow Penske to the IRL for the 2003 season. Target Chip Ganassi Racing and Mo Nunn Racing both set up separate IRL teams in 2002, but continued to compete in CART for the time being, though Mo Nunn downsized his team to a single car. They would be among the teams to leave CART for the IRL in 2003. Blair Racing also left CART for IRL. Patrick Racing downsized their effort to a single car, while Forsythe Racing shut down their third car driven by Bryan Herta in 2001 for lack of sponsorship.

=== Driver changes ===
1996 series champion Jimmy Vasser, one of two former champions in the 2002 field (the other being Michael Andretti), left Patrick Racing for Team Rahal. Joining him at Rahal was Michel Jourdain Jr. who left Herdez Competition. Rahal's 2001 drivers, Kenny Bräck and Max Papis moved to Target Chip Ganassi Racing and Sigma Autosport. Papis took the seat previously occupied by Oriol Servià, who replaced the retiring Maurício Gugelmin at PWR Championship Racing. The 2002 season started with two rookies. 2001 Dayton Indy Lights champion Townsend Bell led a one car effort at Patrick Racing. Mario Domínguez signed on for another single car effort with Herdez Competition.

=== In-season changes ===
- Lack of sponsorship led to the shutdown of PWR Championship Racing after the third race in Motegi, Japan. Scott Dixon landed in a third car at Target Chip Ganassi Racing, while Oriol Servià was sidelined for the time being.
- Having already dropped the Bettenhausen name from its team name with the conclusion of the 2001 season, Herdez Competition changed their car number from 16 to 55 beginning with the fifth round at Mazda Raceway Laguna Seca. #16 had long been associated with Tony Bettenhausen Jr. and his race team.
- The fifth race at Laguna Seca was the last appearance for Sigma Autosport, which, like PWR earlier in the season, found their sponsorship well run dry, leaving Max Papis without a ride.
- A run of disappointing performances and a two probation sanctions from CART Chief Steward Wally Dallenbach Sr. led to the firing of Townsend Bell from Patrick Racing after the ninth round at Cleveland. Oriol Servià drove the #20 car for the remainder of the season.
- Adrián Fernández fractured his hip in a crash in the tenth race at Vancouver and sat out the following race at Mid-Ohio. Max Papis substituted for him.
- Dale Coyne helped put together what was described as an "all-England" team named Team St. George for a one shot effort for the fifteenth race at Rockingham, England. Darren Manning was chosen to be the driver. The team used Coyne's traditional #19 car.
- After clinching the season championship by winning the sixteenth race in Miami Cristiano da Matta ran with #1 on his car for the rest of the season.
- Adrian Fernández was involved in a crash in the seventeenth race at Surfer's Paradise, Australia and suffered two thoracic fractures, which forced him to sit out the final two races of the season. Max Papis sat in for him again at Fontana and Luis Díaz substituted at Mexico City.
- Dale Coyne Racing reappeared under its own name and ran André Lotterer at the final race of the season at Mexico City.

== Rule changes ==
- The biggest rule change was the implementation of mandatory pit windows.
  - A maximum pit window was established; meaning each car go no further than a specified number of laps without pitting. As a result, there were a minimum number of pit stops per race.
  - To count as a mandatory stop, all 4 tires had to be changed. Adding fuel on a pit stop was officially optional to encourage teams to go off sequence with an early stop.
  - Failure to pit within the specified number of laps resulted in a drive-through penalty in addition to the mandatory stop.
  - The rule closing pit road when a full course caution flag was displayed was eliminated to prevent teams from missing their window due to a caution flag coming out.
  - All mandated pit stops must be completed before the white flag lap.
  - The goal of the rule was to eliminate fuel economy runs and allow drivers to run as hard as they could the entire run as they had all the fuel needed to do so. However, teams ended up changing their strategy to conserve fuel so they could release the car from their pit stops as soon as the tire changes were complete. This led to a series of incidents where cars were being released back on track before the tire changes were complete and loose wheels coming off cars once back on track. To deter this CART instituted a mid-season 1-lap penalty and $5,000 fine for any car losing a wheel after a pit stop in addition to the time lost recovering the car to remount the tire.
- Traction control was formally legalized after CART officials determined they could not successfully enforce a ban.
- After several controversies with changing turbo boost in recent years, CART and its engine manufacturers agreed to a reduction of the boost to 34" to remain in place for the entire 2002 season. While technically a reduction by 2" from where engines ended in 2001, lap times and horsepower numbers were still on par and in most cases faster and higher than the previous year.
- Road & Street course qualifying was changed. The race weekend would feature two qualifying sessions, one on Friday and one on Saturday. The fastest driver in each session received one championship point and was guaranteed a front-row start regardless of the results of the other session (the front row guarantee was added at Long Beach).
  - For Rounds 1–12, Each session was 60 minutes in length with 45 minutes of guaranteed green flag running. Teams could complete a maximum of 15 green flag laps per session, though causing a yellow/red flag would result in the loss of your fastest lap.
  - Starting at Montreal for the rest of the season, following numerous events where cars waited until the second half of the session to go out, CART officials changed the 60 minute session to be a 15-minute practice, followed by a 10-minute break, followed by 35 minutes of qualifying with 30 minutes of green-flag running guaranteed.
- In the event of a late-race caution, CART officials were allowed to use the red flag to stop the race, clean up the crash, and attempt a green-flag finish.
- Starting at the Mid-Ohio round, cars that spun off track into the gravel trap were allowed to be pushed back on track by the safety team and get back into the race as long as there was not other significant race-ending damage to the car. Previously a car stuck in a gravel trap would be ruled out of the event.
- Following suit with other motorsports series in the aftermath of the death of Dale Earnhardt, the HANS Device became mandatory at all events, and all pit crew members were required to wear helmets.

== Schedule ==
Icon	Legend
O	Oval/Speedway
R	Road course
S	Street circuit
C	Cancelled race

Rnd	Date	Race Name	Circuit	City/Location
1	March 10	(Mexico) Tecate/Telmex Grand Prix of Monterrey	R Fundidora Park	Monterrey, Mexico
2	April 14	(United States) Toyota Grand Prix of Long Beach	S Streets of Long Beach	Long Beach, California
3	April 27	(Japan) Bridgestone Potenza 500	O Twin Ring Motegi	Motegi, Japan
4	June 2	(United States) Miller Lite 250	O Milwaukee Mile	West Allis, Wisconsin
5	June 9	(United States) Bridgestone Grand Prix of Monterey	R Mazda Raceway Laguna Seca	Monterey, California
6	June 16	(United States) G.I. Joe's 200	R Portland International Raceway	Portland, Oregon
7	June 30	(United States) CART Grand Prix of Chicago	O Chicago Motor Speedway	Cicero, Illinois
8	July 7	(Canada) Molson Indy Toronto	S Exhibition Place	Toronto, Ontario
9	July 14	(United States) Marconi Grand Prix of Cleveland	R Cleveland Burke Lakefront Airport	Cleveland, Ohio
10	July 28	(Canada) Molson Indy Vancouver	S Concord Pacific Place	Vancouver, British Columbia
11	August 11	(United States) CART Grand Prix of Mid-Ohio	R Mid-Ohio Sports Car Course	Lexington, Ohio
12	August 18	(United States) Motorola 220	R Road America	Elkhart Lake, Wisconsin
13	August 25	(Canada) Molson Indy Montreal	R Circuit Gilles Villeneuve	Montreal, Quebec
14	September 1	(United States) Shell Grand Prix of Denver	S Denver Civic Center	Denver, Colorado
15	September 14	(United Kingdom) Sure for Men Rockingham 500	O Rockingham Motor Speedway	Corby, United Kingdom
C	September 21	(Germany) German 500	O EuroSpeedway Lausitz	Klettwitz, Germany
16	October 6	(United States) Grand Prix Americas	S Miami Bayfront Park Street Circuit	Miami, Florida
17	October 27	(Australia) Honda Indy 300	S Surfers Paradise Street Circuit	Surfers Paradise, Australia
18	November 3	(United States) The 500	O California Speedway	Fontana, California
19	November 17	(Mexico) Gran Premio Telmex-Gigante	R Autódromo Hermanos Rodríguez	Mexico City, Mexico

== Results ==
Rnd	Race Name	Pole position	Fastest lap	Lead most laps	Winning driver	Winning team	Report
1	(Mexico) Monterrey	(Mexico) Adrián Fernández	(Brazil) Cristiano da Matta	(Brazil) Cristiano da Matta	(Brazil) Cristiano da Matta	Newman/Haas Racing	Report
2	(United States) Long Beach	(United States) Jimmy Vasser	(Brazil) Bruno Junqueira	(United States) Michael Andretti	(United States) Michael Andretti	Team Motorola	Report
3	(Japan) Motegi	(Brazil) Bruno Junqueira	(Brazil) Tony Kanaan	(Brazil) Tony Kanaan	(Brazil) Bruno Junqueira	Target Chip Ganassi Racing	Report
4	(United States) Milwaukee	(Mexico) Adrián Fernández	(Sweden) Kenny Bräck	(Canada) Paul Tracy	(Canada) Paul Tracy	Team KOOL Green	Report
5	(United States) Laguna Seca	(Brazil) Cristiano da Matta	(Brazil) Cristiano da Matta	(Brazil) Cristiano da Matta	(Brazil) Cristiano da Matta	Newman/Haas Racing	Report
6	(United States) Portland	(Brazil) Cristiano da Matta	(Brazil) Bruno Junqueira	(Brazil) Cristiano da Matta (Sweden) Kenny Bräck	(Brazil) Cristiano da Matta	Newman/Haas Racing	Report
7	(United States) Chicago	(United Kingdom) Dario Franchitti	(Canada) Paul Tracy	(Brazil) Cristiano da Matta	(Brazil) Cristiano da Matta	Newman/Haas Racing	Report
8	(Canada) Toronto	(Brazil) Cristiano da Matta	(Brazil) Cristiano da Matta	(Brazil) Cristiano da Matta	(Brazil) Cristiano da Matta	Newman/Haas Racing	Report
9	(United States) Cleveland	(Brazil) Cristiano da Matta	(Canada) Paul Tracy	(Canada) Patrick Carpentier	(Canada) Patrick Carpentier	Team Player's	Report
10	(Canada) Vancouver	(Brazil) Cristiano da Matta	(Brazil) Cristiano da Matta	(Canada) Paul Tracy	(United Kingdom) Dario Franchitti	Team KOOL Green	Report
11	(United States) Mid-Ohio	(Canada) Patrick Carpentier	(Brazil) Cristiano da Matta	(Canada) Patrick Carpentier	(Canada) Patrick Carpentier	Team Player's	Report
12	(United States) Road America	(Brazil) Bruno Junqueira	(Brazil) Bruno Junqueira	(Canada) Paul Tracy	(Brazil) Cristiano da Matta	Newman/Haas Racing	Report
13	(Canada) Montreal	(Brazil) Cristiano da Matta	(United Kingdom) Dario Franchitti	(United Kingdom) Dario Franchitti	(United Kingdom) Dario Franchitti	Team KOOL Green	Report
14	(United States) Denver	(Brazil) Bruno Junqueira	(Sweden) Kenny Bräck	(Brazil) Bruno Junqueira	(Brazil) Bruno Junqueira	Target Chip Ganassi Racing	Report
15	(United Kingdom) Rockingham	(Sweden) Kenny Bräck	(United States) Jimmy Vasser	(Sweden) Kenny Bräck	(United Kingdom) Dario Franchitti	Team KOOL Green	Report
16	(United States) Miami	(Brazil) Tony Kanaan	(Brazil) Christian Fittipaldi	(Brazil) Cristiano da Matta	(Brazil) Cristiano da Matta	Newman/Haas Racing	Report
17	(Australia) Surfers Paradise	(Brazil) Cristiano da Matta	(Brazil) Cristiano da Matta	(Brazil) Cristiano da Matta	(Mexico) Mario Domínguez	Herdez Competition	Report
18	(United States) Fontana	(Brazil) Tony Kanaan	(Spain) Oriol Servià	(United States) Jimmy Vasser	(United States) Jimmy Vasser	Team Rahal	Report
19	Mexico City	(Brazil) Bruno Junqueira	(Japan) Shinji Nakano	(Brazil) Tony Kanaan	(Sweden) Kenny Bräck	Target Chip Ganassi Racing	Report

=== Final driver standings ===
Pos	Driver	FUN (Mexico)	LBH (United States)	MOT (Japan)	MIL (United States)	LAG (United States)	POR (United States)	CMS (United States)	TOR (Canada)	CLE (United States)	VAN (Canada)	MOH (United States)	ROA (United States)	CGV (Canada)	DEN (United States)	ROC (United Kingdom)	BAY (United States)	SUR (Australia)	CAL (United States)	MXC (Mexico)	Pts
1	(Brazil) Cristiano da Matta	1*	8	13	11	**1***	**1***	1*	**1***	**16**	**12**	13	1	**2**	3	2	1*	**8***	11	2	237
2	(Brazil) Bruno Junqueira	11	17	**1**	10	4	2	2	14	13	9	4	**3**	13	**1***	5	5	14	9	**3**	164
3	(Canada) Patrick Carpentier	7	19	4	15	5	5	16	10	1*	5	**1***	7	15	17	3	16	2	3	4	157
4	(United Kingdom) Dario Franchitti	2	9	3	12	19	3	**3**	13	14	1	17	12	1*	18	1	10	7	10	5	148
5	(Brazil) Christian Fittipaldi	3	13	12	4	2	13	14	3	12	13	2	6	7	5	17	2	11	7	15	122
6	(Sweden) Kenny Bräck	18	5	17	8	3	15	18	2	4	18	6	14	18	7	**8***	13	4	12	1	114
7	(United States) Jimmy Vasser	20	**2**	20	9	8	16	17	6	6	17	8	5	5	10	7	3	12	1*	11	114
8	(Canada) Alex Tagliani	5	16	2	19	10	12	7	7	5	7	7	2	11	12	18	4	6	8	10	111
9	(United States) Michael Andretti	12	1*	16	7	11	9	15	11	2	6	3	10	8	13	10	8	9	2	17	110
10	(Mexico) Michel Jourdain Jr.	4	4	5	5	9	6	10	12	9	4	11	9	6	9	11	6	10	13	13	105
11	(Canada) Paul Tracy	8	7	19	1*	17	17	9	16	3	2*	18	13*	4	8	19	12	3	17	16	101
12	(Brazil) Tony Kanaan	16	20	15*	16	12	8	8	17	8	3	14	4	3	6	15	**9**	5	**4**	8*	99
13	(New Zealand) Scott Dixon	6	18	9	6	6	7	6	5	15	16	5	17	10	2	12	18	15	6	7	97
14	(Mexico) Adrián Fernández	**13**	10	7	**2**	18	14	13	9	11	8		18	12	4	14	7	17			59
15	(Japan) Toranosuke Takagi	14	6	8	14	16	18	4	8	7	15	12	15	14	15	6	15	18	18	6	53
16	(Spain) Oriol Servià	10	11	6							14	10	16	16	11	4	17	16	5	9	44
17	(Japan) Shinji Nakano	15	12	10	18	14	11	5	4	10	11	9	11	9	16	16	14	13	15	14	43
18	(Mexico) Mario Domínguez RY	17	14	11	17	15	10	11	18	17	10	16	8	17	14	13	11	1	16	18	37
19	(Italy) Max Papis	9	3	18	3	13						15							14		32
20	(United States) Townsend Bell R	19	15	14	13	7	4	12	15	18											19
21	(United Kingdom) Darren Manning R															9					4
22	(Germany) André Lotterer R																			12	1
23	(Mexico) Luis Díaz R																			19	0
Pos	Driver	FUN (Mexico)	LBH (United States)	MOT (Japan)	MIL (United States)	LAG (United States)	POR (United States)	CMS (United States)	TOR (Canada)	CLE (United States)	VAN (Canada)	MOH (United States)	ROA (United States)	CGV (Canada)	DEN (United States)	ROC (United Kingdom)	BAY (United States)	SUR (Australia)	CAL (United States)	MXC (Mexico)	Pts

Color	Result
Gold	Winner
Silver	2nd place
Bronze	3rd place
Green	4th–6th place
Light Blue	7th–12th place
Dark Blue	Finished (Outside Top 12)
Purple	Did not finish
Red	Did not qualify (DNQ)
Brown	Withdrawn (Wth)
Black	Disqualified (DSQ)
White	Did not start (DNS)
Blank	Did not participate (DNP)
Blank	Not competing

**In-line notation**
**Bold**	Pole position
Italics	Ran fastest race lap
*	Led most race laps
RY	Rookie of the Year
R	Rookie

=== Nations' Cup ===
- Top result per race counts towards Nations' Cup.

Pos	Country	FUN (Mexico)	LBH (United States)	MOT (Japan)	MIL (United States)	LAG (United States)	POR (United States)	CMS (United States)	TOR (Canada)	CLE (United States)	VAN (Canada)	MOH (United States)	ROA (United States)	CGV (Canada)	DEN (United States)	ROC (United Kingdom)	BAY (United States)	SUR (Australia)	CAL (United States)	MEX (Mexico)	Pts
1	Brazil	1	8	1	4	1	1	1	1	8	3	2	1	2	1	2	1	5	4	2	325
2	Canada	5	7	2	1	5	5	7	7	1	2	1	2	4	8	3	4	2	3	4	247
3	United States	12	1	14	7	7	4	12	6	2	6	3	5	5	10	7	3	9	1	11	164
4	United Kingdom	2	9	3	12	19	3	3	13	14	1	17	12	1	18	1	10	7	10	5	148
5	Mexico	4	4	5	2	9	6	10	9	9	4	11	8	6	4	11	6	1	13	13	142
6	Sweden	18	5	17	8	3	15	18	2	4	18	6	14	18	7	8	13	4	12	1	113
7	New Zealand	6	18	9	6	6	7	6	5	15	16	5	17	10	2	12	18	15	6	7	96
8	Japan	14	6	8	14	14	11	4	4	7	11	9	11	9	15	6	14	13	15	6	73
9	Spain	10	11	6							14	10	16	16	11	4	17	16	5	9	44
10	Italy	9	3	18	3	13						15							14		32
11	Germany																			12	1
Pos	Country	FUN (Mexico)	LBH (United States)	MOT (Japan)	MIL (United States)	LAG (United States)	POR (United States)	CMS (United States)	TOR (Canada)	CLE (United States)	VAN (Canada)	MOH (United States)	ROA (United States)	CGV (Canada)	DEN (United States)	ROC (United Kingdom)	BAY (United States)	SUR (Australia)	CAL (United States)	MEX (Mexico)	Pts

=== Chassis Constructors' Cup ===
Pos	Chassis	Pts
1	(United Kingdom) Lola	401
2	(United Kingdom) Reynard	235
Pos	Chassis	Pts

=== Engine Manufacturers' Cup ===
Pos	Engine	Pts
1	(Japan) Toyota	332
2	(Japan) Honda	283
3	(United States) / (United Kingdom) Ford-Cosworth	259
Pos	Engine	Pts

=== Driver breakdown ===
Pos	Driver	Team	Entries	Wins	Podiums	Top 5s	Top 10s	Poles	Laps Led	Points
1	(Brazil) da Matta	(United States) Newman-Haas Racing	19	7	11	11	13	7	619	237
2	(Brazil) Junqueira	(United States) Target Chip Ganassi Racing	19	2	6	10	12	4	196	164
3	(Canada) Carpentier	(United States) Team Player's	19	2	5	10	13	1	159	157
4	(United Kingdom) Franchitti	(United States) Team KOOL Green	19	3	7	8	11	1	252	148
5	(Brazil) Fittipaldi	(United States) Newman-Haas Racing	19	0	5	7	11	1	18	122
6	(Sweden) Bräck	(United States) Target Chip Ganassi Racing	19	1	3	6	10	1	268	114
7	(United States) Vasser	(United States) Team Rahal	19	1	3	5	12	1	162	114
8	(Canada) Tagliani	(United States) Team Player's	19	0	2	5	12	0	115	111
9	(United States) Andretti	(United States) Team Motorola	19	1	3	3	11	0	90	110
10	(Mexico) Jourdain Jr.	(United States) Team Rahal	19	0	0	5	14	0	24	105
11	(Canada) Tracy	(United States) Team KOOL Green	19	1	4	5	9	0	314	101
12	(Brazil) Kanaan	(United States) Mo Nunn Racing	19	0	2	5	11	2	145	99
13	(New Zealand) Dixon	(United States) PWR Championship Racing (United States) Target Chip Ganassi Racing	19	0	1	3	12	0	0	97
14	(Mexico) Fernández	(Mexico) Fernández Racing	16	0	1	2	6	2	15	57
15	(Japan) Takagi	(United States) Walker Motorsport	19	0	0	1	7	0	0	53
16	(Spain) Servià	(United States) PWR Championship Racing (United States) Patrick Racing	13	0	0	2	6	0	0	44
17	(Japan) Nakano	(Mexico) Fernández Racing	19	0	0	2	6	0	10	43
18	(Mexico) Domínguez R	(Mexico) Herdez Competition	19	1	1	1	3	0	5	37
19	(Italy) Papis	(United States) Sigma Autosport (Mexico) Fernández Racing	7	0	2	2	3	0	1	32
20	(United States) Bell R	(United States) Patrick Racing	9	0	0	1	2	0	0	19
21	(United Kingdom) Manning R	(United Kingdom) Team St. George	1	0	0	0	1	0	18	4
22	(Germany) Lotterer R	(United States) Dale Coyne Racing	1	0	0	0	0	0	0	1
23	(Mexico) Díaz R	(Mexico) Fernández Racing	1	0	0	0	0	0	0	0

== See also ==
- 2002 Toyota Atlantic Championship season
- 2002 Indianapolis 500
- 2002 Indy Racing League
- 2002 Infiniti Pro Series season

== Bibliography ==
- Shaw, Jeremy, ed. (2003). Autocourse Cart Official Champ Car Yearbook 2002-2003. Richmond, Surrey: Hazleton Publishing. ISBN 978-1-903135-17-4.
