= 2001 Miller Lite 225 =

Coordinates: 43.02°N 88.01°W

(United States) 2001 Miller Lite 225
Race details
- Race 6 of 21 in the 2001 CART season
- Date: June 3, 2001
- Official name: 2001 Miller Lite 225
- Location: Milwaukee Mile, West Allis, Wisconsin, United States
- Course: Oval; 1 mi / 1.6 km
- Distance: 225 laps 225 mi / 362.102 km

Pole position
- Driver: (Sweden) Kenny Bräck (Team Rahal)
- Time: No time

Fastest lap
- Driver: (Scotland) Dario Franchitti (Team Green)
- Time: 23.277 (on lap 201 of 225)

Podium
- First: (Sweden) Kenny Bräck (Team Rahal)
- Second: (United States) Michael Andretti (Team Motorola)
- Third: (New Zealand) Scott Dixon (PacWest Racing)

Chronology
Previous	Next
2000	2002

The 2001 Miller Lite 225 was a Championship Auto Racing Teams (CART) motor race held on June 3, 2001, at the Milwaukee Mile in West Allis, Wisconsin, USA. It was the 6th round of the 2001 CART FedEx Championship Series season. Team Rahal's Kenny Bräck scored his second career and second consecutive CART race win ahead of a resurgent Michael Andretti and rookie Scott Dixon.

Bräck's second win in a row cemented his status at the top of the drivers' standings, now thirty points ahead of 2nd place Hélio Castroneves. This was Andretti's first podium of the year and his first after leaving Newman/Haas Racing; he was the only car that seemed capable of challenging Bräck for the win as the race went on. Dixon, who had won at Nazareth earlier in the season, picked up his second career podium and PacWest Racing's final podium in the series.

The race saw multiple crashes take out several championship contenders, as Cristiano da Matta, in a repeat of the previous race at Motegi, crashed on Lap 1 with Castroneves; Paul Tracy then crashed a few laps later. Jimmy Vasser, who was running 3rd, was taken out by Tora Takagi while trying to lap him on Lap 132; Takagi would be disqualified two laps later for his role in the accident. Finally, Christian Fittipaldi and Nicolas Minassian collided near the end of the race, which would prompt Chip Ganassi Racing to drop the latter after the next race in Detroit.

== Qualifying ==
Qualifying was rained out; the lineup was determined by points standings.

Qualifying not held — Starting lineup
Rank	Driver	Team
1	(Sweden) Kenny Bräck	Team Rahal
2	(Brazil) Hélio Castroneves	Team Penske
3	(Brazil) Cristiano da Matta	Newman-Haas Racing
4	(Canada) Paul Tracy	Team Green
5	(United States) Jimmy Vasser	Patrick Racing
6	(Brazil) Gil de Ferran	Team Penske
7	(Brazil) Tony Kanaan	Mo Nunn Racing
8	(New Zealand) Scott Dixon (R)	PacWest Racing
9	(Brazil) Christian Fittipaldi	Newman-Haas Racing
10	(United States) Michael Andretti	Team Motorola
11	(Scotland) Dario Franchitti	Team Green
12	(Brazil) Bruno Junqueira (R)	Chip Ganassi Racing
13	(Italy) Max Papis	Team Rahal
14	(France) Nicolas Minassian (R)	Chip Ganassi Racing
15	(Italy) Alex Zanardi	Mo Nunn Racing
16	(Japan) Shinji Nakano	Fernandez Racing
17	(Brazil) Roberto Moreno	Patrick Racing
18	(Spain) Oriol Servià	Sigma Autosport
19	(Japan) Tora Takagi (R)	Walker Motorsport
20	(United States) Bryan Herta	Forsythe Racing
21	(Mexico) Michel Jourdain Jr.	Bettenhausen Racing
22	(Brazil) Maurício Gugelmin	PacWest Racing
23	(Mexico) Adrian Fernández	Fernandez Racing
24	(Brazil) Max Wilson (R)	Arciero Racing
25	(Canada) Alex Tagliani	Forsythe Racing
26	(Canada) Patrick Carpentier	Forsythe Racing

== Race ==
Pos	No	Driver	Team	Laps	Time/retired	Grid	Points
1	8	(Sweden) Kenny Bräck	Team Rahal	225	1:54:08.097	1	21^{1}
2	39	(United States) Michael Andretti	Team Motorola	225	+1.307	10	16
3	18	(New Zealand) Scott Dixon (R)	PacWest Racing	225	+3.001	8	14
4	4	(Brazil) Bruno Junqueira (R)	Chip Ganassi Racing	225	+6.714	12	12
5	51	(Mexico) Adrian Fernández	Fernandez Racing	225	+9.702	23	10
6	55	(Brazil) Tony Kanaan	Mo Nunn Racing	225	+10.291	7	8
7	1	(Brazil) Gil de Ferran	Team Penske	225	+12.821	6	6
8	7	(Italy) Max Papis	Team Rahal	225	+17.780	13	5
9	27	(Scotland) Dario Franchitti	Team Green	224	+1 Lap	11	4
10	17	(Brazil) Maurício Gugelmin	PacWest Racing	224	+1 Lap	22	3
11	66	(Italy) Alex Zanardi	Mo Nunn Racing	224	+1 Lap	15	2
12	33	(Canada) Alex Tagliani	Forsythe Racing	224	+1 Lap	25	1
13	16	(Mexico) Michel Jourdain Jr.	Bettenhausen Racing	224	+1 Lap	21	—
14	22	(Spain) Oriol Servià	Sigma Autosport	224	+1 Lap	18	—
15	20	(Brazil) Roberto Moreno	Patrick Racing	224	+1 Lap	17	—
16	52	(Japan) Shinji Nakano	Fernandez Racing	224	+1 Lap	16	—
17	32	(Canada) Patrick Carpentier	Forsythe Racing	223	+2 Laps	26	—
18	11	(Brazil) Christian Fittipaldi	Newman-Haas Racing	204	Contact	9	—
19	12	(France) Nicolas Minassian (R)	Chip Ganassi Racing	203	Contact	14	—
20	5	(Japan) Tora Takagi (R)	Walker Motorsport	134	Disqualified	19	—
21	40	(United States) Jimmy Vasser	Patrick Racing	132	Contact	5	—
22	77	(United States) Bryan Herta	Forsythe Racing	73	Spark plug	20	—
23	25	(Brazil) Max Wilson (R)	Arciero Racing	43	Electrical	24	—
24	26	(Canada) Paul Tracy	Team Green	11	Contact	4	—
25	6	(Brazil) Cristiano da Matta	Newman-Haas Racing	1	Contact	3	—
26	3	(Brazil) Hélio Castroneves	Team Penske	0	Contact	2	—

- ^{1}– Includes one bonus point for leading the most laps.
- *The bonus point for pole position was not awarded as qualifying was rained out.

== Race statistics ==
- Lead changes: 12 among 9 drivers

Lap Leaders
Laps	Leader
1–80	Kenny Bräck
81–90	Michael Andretti
91–92	Jimmy Vasser
93–100	Tony Kanaan
101–102	Scott Dixon
103	Alex Tagliani
104	Patrick Carpentier
105	Michel Jourdain Jr.
106–110	Adrian Fernández
111–128	Michael Andretti
129–135	Kenny Bräck
136–182	Michael Andretti
183–225	Kenny Bräck

Total laps led
Leader	Laps
Kenny Bräck	130
Michael Andretti	75
Tony Kanaan	8
Adrian Fernández	5
Scott Dixon	2
Jimmy Vasser	2
Alex Tagliani	1
Patrick Carpentier	1
Michel Jourdain Jr.	1

Cautions: 5 for 48 laps
Laps	Reason
0–11	da Matta and Castroneves crash
11–20	Paul Tracy crashes
108–120	Zanardi crashes in Turn 4
132–142	Jimmy Vasser crashes
205–218	Fittipaldi and Minassian crash

== Standings after the race ==
Drivers' standings

Pos	+/-	Driver	Points
1		(Sweden) Kenny Bräck	70
2		(Brazil) Hélio Castroneves	47
3		(Brazil) Cristiano da Matta	40
—		(Canada) Paul Tracy	40
—		(United States) Jimmy Vasser	40

Constructors' standings

Pos	+/–	Constructor	Points
1		(United Kingdom) Lola	98
2	1	(United Kingdom) Reynard	93

Manufacturer's Standings

Pos	+/-	Manufacturer	Points
1		(Japan) Honda	86
2		(Japan) Toyota	84
3		(United Kingdom) Ford-Cosworth	73
4		(United Kingdom) Phoenix	0

Previous race: 2001 Firestone Firehawk 500	CART FedEx Championship Series; 2001 season	Next race: 2001 Tenneco Automotive Grand Prix of Detroit
Previous race: 2000 Miller Lite 225	Milwaukee Mile	Next race: 2002 Miller Lite 250
