= 2002 Bridgestone Grand Prix of Monterey =

(United States) 2002 Monterey
Race details
- Race 5 of 19 in the 2002 CART season
- Laguna Seca track layout
- Date: June 9, 2002
- Official name: Bridgestone Grand Prix of Monterey Featuring the Shell 300
- Location: Mazda Raceway Laguna Seca, Monterey, California, United States
- Course: Permanent road course 2.238 mi / 3.602 km
- Distance: 87 laps 194.706 mi / 313.374 km
- Weather: Sunny and cool

Pole position
- Driver: (Brazil) Cristiano da Matta (Newman/Haas Racing)
- Time: 1:09.473

Fastest lap
- Driver: (Brazil) Cristiano da Matta (Newman/Haas Racing)
- Time: 1:11.369 (on lap 71 of 87)

Podium
- First: (Brazil) Cristiano da Matta (Newman/Haas Racing)
- Second: (Brazil) Christian Fittipaldi (Newman/Haas Racing)
- Third: (Sweden) Kenny Bräck (Target Chip Ganassi Racing)

The 2002 Bridgestone Grand Prix of Monterey was the fifth round of the 2002 CART FedEx Champ Car World Series season, held on June 9, 2002 at Mazda Raceway Laguna Seca in Monterey, California.

The winner was Cristiano da Matta.

== Qualifying results ==
Pos	Nat	Name	Team	Qual 1	Qual 2	Best
1	(Brazil)	Cristiano da Matta	Newman/Haas Racing	1:10.103	1:09.473	1:09.473
2	(Sweden)	Kenny Bräck	Target Chip Ganassi Racing	1:10.066	1:09.575	1:09.575
3	(Brazil)	Bruno Junqueira	Target Chip Ganassi Racing	1:10.476	1:09.759	1:09.759
4	(Brazil)	Tony Kanaan	Mo Nunn Racing	1:10.264	1:10.043	1:10.043
5	(Brazil)	Christian Fittipaldi	Newman/Haas Racing	1:10.322	1:10.184	1:10.184
6	(Canada)	Patrick Carpentier	Team Player's	1:10.218	1:10.255	1:10.218
7	(Canada)	Alex Tagliani	Team Player's	1:10.652	1:10.269	1:10.269
8	(Japan)	Tora Takagi	Walker Racing	1:11.196	1:10.288	1:10.288
9	(New Zealand)	Scott Dixon	Target Chip Ganassi Racing	1:11.289	1:10.290	1:10.290
10	(United States)	Townsend Bell	Patrick Racing	1:10.721	1:10.357	1:10.357
11	(Mexico)	Michel Jourdain Jr.	Team Rahal	1:11.378	1:10.389	1:10.389
12	(Mexico)	Mario Domínguez	Herdez Competition	1:11.123	1:10.415	1:10.415
13	(Mexico)	Adrian Fernández	Fernández Racing	1:11.081	1:10.449	1:10.449
14	(United Kingdom)	Dario Franchitti	Team KOOL Green	1:12.102	1:10.596	1:10.596
15	(United States)	Jimmy Vasser	Team Rahal	1:10.920	1:10.612	1:10.612
16	(Canada)	Paul Tracy	Team KOOL Green	1:11.172	1:10.616	1:10.616
17	(Italy)	Max Papis	Sigma Autosport	1:11.127	1:10.681	1:10.681
18	(Japan)	Shinji Nakano	Fernández Racing	1:12.056	1:11.319	1:11.319
19	(United States)	Michael Andretti	Team Motorola	1:11.577	1:11.497	1:11.497

== Race ==
Pos	No	Driver	Team	Laps	Time/Retired	Grid	Points
1	6	(Brazil) Cristiano da Matta	Newman/Haas Racing	87	1:55:28.745	1	22
2	11	(Brazil) Christian Fittipaldi	Newman/Haas Racing	87	+19.087	5	16
3	12	(Sweden) Kenny Bräck	Target Chip Ganassi Racing	87	+19.410	2	15
4	4	(Brazil) Bruno Junqueira	Target Chip Ganassi Racing	87	+34.255	3	12
5	32	(Canada) Patrick Carpentier	Team Player's	87	+35.095	6	10
6	44	(New Zealand) Scott Dixon	Target Chip Ganassi Racing	87	+1:11.956	9	8
7	20	(United States) Townsend Bell	Patrick Racing	87	+1:12.431	10	6
8	8	(United States) Jimmy Vasser	Team Rahal	86	+ 1 Lap	15	5
9	9	(Mexico) Michel Jourdain Jr.	Team Rahal	86	+ 1 Lap	11	4
10	33	(Canada) Alex Tagliani	Team Player's	86	+ 1 Lap	7	3
11	39	(United States) Michael Andretti	Team Motorola	86	+ 1 Lap	19	2
12	10	(Brazil) Tony Kanaan	Mo Nunn Racing	86	+ 1 Lap	4	1
13	22	(Italy) Max Papis	Sigma Autosport	86	+ 1 Lap	17	0
14	52	(Japan) Shinji Nakano	Fernández Racing	86	+ 1 Lap	18	0
15	55	(Mexico) Mario Domínguez	Herdez Competition	84	+ 3 Laps	12	0
16	5	(Japan) Tora Takagi	Walker Racing	83	Spun off	8	0
17	26	(Canada) Paul Tracy	Team KOOL Green	15	Contact/ Wheel	16	0
18	51	(Mexico) Adrian Fernández	Fernández Racing	0	Contact	13	0
19	27	(United Kingdom) Dario Franchitti	Team KOOL Green	0	Contact	14	0

== Caution flags ==
Laps	Cause
1-5	Vasser (8), Bell (20), Franchitti (27), Fernández (51) & Domínguez (55) contact
17-19	Tracy (26) contact

== Notes ==
Laps	Leader
1-61	Cristiano da Matta
62	Kenny Bräck
63-66	Christian Fittipaldi
67-87	Cristiano da Matta

Driver	Laps led
Cristiano da Matta	82
Christian Fittipaldi	4
Kenny Bräck	1

- New Race Record Cristiano da Matta 1:55:28.745
- Average Speed 101.164 mph

Previous race: 2002 Miller Lite 250	CART FedEx Championship Series; 2002 season	Next race: 2002 G.I. Joe's 200
Previous race: 2001 Honda Grand Prix of Monterey	Bridgestone Grand Prix of Monterey 300	Next race: 2003 Grand Prix of Monterey
