= 2001 Firestone Firehawk 500 =

Coordinates: 36°32′01″N 140°13′39″E

(Japan) 2001 Firestone Firehawk 500
Race details
- Race 5 of 21 in the 2001 CART season
- Date: May 19, 2001
- Official name: 2001 Firestone Firehawk 500
- Location: Twin Ring Motegi, Tochigi, Japan
- Course: Oval; 1.549 mi / 2.493 km
- Distance: 201 laps 311.349 mi / 501.067 km

Pole position
- Driver: (Brazil) (Brazil) Hélio Castroneves (Team Penske)
- Time: 25.849

Fastest lap
- Driver: (Italy) (Italy) Alex Zanardi (Mo Nunn Racing)
- Time: 26.715 (on lap 184 of 201)

Podium
- First: (Sweden) (Sweden) Kenny Bräck (Team Rahal)
- Second: (Brazil) (Brazil) Hélio Castroneves (Team Penske)
- Third: (Brazil) (Brazil) Tony Kanaan (Mo Nunn Racing)

The 2001 Firestone Firehawk 500 was a Championship Auto Racing Teams (CART) motor race held on May 19, 2001 at Twin Ring Motegi in Tochigi, Japan. It was the 5th round of the 2001 CART FedEx Championship Series season. Team Rahal driver Kenny Bräck scored his first career win in CART despite not starting on the front row for the first time that season. Polesitter Hélio Castroneves finished 2nd and Tony Kanaan took 3rd.

Bräck's win moved him five spots into 1st place in the drivers' standings, where he would remain for much of the season. It was Team Rahal's first win of the season and their first since 2000 at Miami-Homestead. Castroneves' podium put him at 2nd place overall in the standings; he and Bräck would continue to battle for 1st place for much of the season. Kanaan's podium was his first since his win at the 1999 U.S. 500 in Michigan and would be his and Mo Nunn Racing's only podium in 2001.

The race was a testament to Bräck and Castroneves' blistering race pace, as both were the only ones still on the lead lap at the end of the race; this was partially the result of the long, uninterrupted stretch of green-flag running between Laps 8 and 194. Throughout the race Brack was the last of the leaders to pit during each round of stops. He thus needed less fuel at his final pit stop and saved enough time to leap from third to first place. The race also saw heavy attrition, as almost half of the entrants ultimately retired with a variety of issues. Points leader Cristiano da Matta was taken out on Lap 1 by rookie Bruno Junqueira, who spun coming out of Turn 2. This dropped the points leader into a tie for 3rd in the standings.

== Qualifying ==
May 18, 2001 - Qualifying Speeds
Rank	Driver	Time	Leader	Speed (mph)	Team
1	(Brazil) Hélio Castroneves	25.849	—	215.591	Team Penske
2	(Scotland) Dario Franchitti	25.991	+0.142	214.413	Team Green
3	(Brazil) Gil de Ferran	25.993	+0.144	214.396	Team Penske
4	(Brazil) Tony Kanaan	26.022	+0.173	214.157	Mo Nunn Racing
5	(Brazil) Bruno Junqueira (R)	26.035	+0.186	214.050	Chip Ganassi Racing
6	(Sweden) Kenny Bräck	26.044	+0.195	213.976	Team Rahal
7	(Mexico) Michel Jourdain Jr.	26.057	+0.208	213.870	Bettenhausen Racing
8	(Italy) Alex Zanardi	26.088	+0.239	213.615	Mo Nunn Racing
9	(Mexico) Adrian Fernández	26.097	+0.248	213.542	Fernandez Racing
10	(Canada) Patrick Carpentier	26.147	+0.298	213.132	Forsythe Racing
11	(United States) Michael Andretti	26.215	+0.366	212.581	Team Motorola
12	(Brazil) Cristiano da Matta	26.274	+0.425	212.103	Newman-Haas Racing
13	(Japan) Shinji Nakano	26.280	+0.431	212.055	Fernandez Racing
14	(Brazil) Christian Fittipaldi	26.366	+0.517	211.363	Newman-Haas Racing
15	(France) Nicolas Minassian (R)	26.378	+0.529	211.267	Chip Ganassi Racing
16	(Canada) Paul Tracy	26.432	+0.583	210.835	Team Green
17	(Italy) Max Papis	26.452	+0.603	210.676	Team Rahal
18	(Spain) Oriol Servià	26.528	+0.679	210.072	Sigma Autosport
19	(Canada) Alex Tagliani	26.530	+0.681	210.057	Forsythe Racing
20	(New Zealand) Scott Dixon (R)	26.587	+0.738	209.606	PacWest Racing
21	(United States) Jimmy Vasser	26.600	+0.751	209.504	Patrick Racing
22	(United States) Bryan Herta	26.786	+0.937	208.049	Forsythe Racing
23	(Brazil) Roberto Moreno	26.800	+0.951	207.940	Patrick Racing
24	(Japan) Tora Takagi (R)	26.840	+0.991	207.630	Walker Motorsport
25	(Brazil) Maurício Gugelmin	26.860	+1.011	207.476	PacWest Racing

== Race ==
Pos	No	Driver	Team	Laps	Time/retired	Grid	Points
1	8	(Sweden) Kenny Bräck	Team Rahal	201	1:44:48.888; 178.113 mph	6	20
2	3	(Brazil) Hélio Castroneves	Team Penske	201	+3.650	1	18^{1}
3	55	(Brazil) Tony Kanaan	Mo Nunn Racing	200	+1 Lap	4	14
4	11	(Brazil) Christian Fittipaldi	Newman-Haas Racing	200	+1 Lap	14	12
5	40	(United States) Jimmy Vasser	Patrick Racing	200	+1 Lap	21	10
6	7	(Italy) Max Papis	Team Rahal	200	+1 Lap	17	8
7	66	(Italy) Alex Zanardi	Mo Nunn Racing	199	+2 Laps	8	6
8	52	(Japan) Shinji Nakano	Fernandez Racing	199	+2 Laps	13	5
9	18	(New Zealand) Scott Dixon (R)	PacWest Racing	198	+3 Laps	20	4
10	20	(Brazil) Roberto Moreno	Patrick Racing	198	+3 Laps	23	3
11	16	(Mexico) Michel Jourdain Jr.	Bettenhausen Racing	197	+4 Laps	7	2
12	17	(Brazil) Maurício Gugelmin	PacWest Racing	197	+4 Laps	25	1
13	1	(Brazil) Gil de Ferran	Team Penske	194	Oil line	3	—
14	22	(Spain) Oriol Servià	Sigma Autosport	191	+7 Laps	18	—
15	12	(France) Nicolas Minassian (R)	Chip Ganassi Racing	190	Contact	15	—
16	51	(Mexico) Adrian Fernández	Fernandez Racing	148	Electrical	9	—
17	27	(Scotland) Dario Franchitti	Team Green	126	Header	2	—
18	26	(Canada) Paul Tracy	Team Green	77	Gearbox	16	—
19	32	(Canada) Patrick Carpentier	Forsythe Racing	54	Oil tank	10	—
20	5	(Japan) Tora Takagi (R)	Walker Motorsport	51	Throttle	24	—
21	77	(United States) Bryan Herta	Forsythe Racing	50	Header	22	—
22	33	(Canada) Alex Tagliani	Forsythe Racing	40	Gearbox	19	—
23	39	(United States) Michael Andretti	Team Motorola	33	Gearbox	11	—
24	4	(Brazil) Bruno Junqueira (R)	Chip Ganassi Racing	1	Contact	5	—
25	6	(Brazil) Cristiano da Matta	Newman-Haas Racing	0	Contact	12	—

- ^{1}– Includes two bonus points for leading the most laps and being the fastest qualifier.

== Race statistics ==
- Lead changes: 9 among 5 drivers

Lap Leaders
Laps	Leader
1–50	Helio Castroneves
51-54	Kenny Bräck
55	Scott Dixon
56-84	Helio Castroneves
85-96	Kenny Bräck
97	Dario Franchitti
98-104	Kenny Bräck
105-144	Tony Kanaan
145-149	Helio Castroneves
150-201	Kenny Bräck

Total laps led
Leader	Laps
Helio Castroneves	84
Kenny Bräck	75
Tony Kanaan	40
Scott Dixon	1
Dario Franchitti	1

Cautions: 2 for 13 laps
Laps	Reason
1-8	Junqueira and da Matta crash
194-200	Minassian hits the wall in Turn 4

== Standings after the race ==
Drivers' standings

Pos	+/-	Driver	Points
1	5	(Sweden) Kenny Bräck	49
2	3	(Brazil) Hélio Castroneves	47
3	2	(Brazil) Cristiano da Matta	40
—	1	(Canada) Paul Tracy	40
—		(United States) Jimmy Vasser	40

Constructors' standings

Pos	+/–	Constructor	Points
1	1	(United Kingdom) Lola	77
—		(United Kingdom) Reynard	77

Manufacturer's Standings

Pos	+/-	Manufacturer	Points
1		(Japan) Honda	71
2		(Japan) Toyota	70
3		(United Kingdom) Ford-Cosworth	52
4		(United Kingdom) Phoenix	0

Previous race: 2001 Lehigh Valley Grand Prix	CART FedEx Championship Series; 2001 season	Next race: 2001 Miller Lite 225
Previous race: 2000 Firestone Firehawk 500	Firestone Firehawk 500	Next race: 2002 Bridgestone Potenza 500
