= 2002 Miller Lite 250 =

(United States) 2002 Milwaukee
Race details
- Race 4 of 19 in the 2002 CART season
- Milwaukee Mile track layout
- Date: June 2, 2002
- Official name: 2002 Miller Lite 250
- Location: Milwaukee Mile, West Allis, Wisconsin, United States
- Course: 1 mile oval 20 mi / 1.609 km
- Distance: 250 laps 250 mi / 402.336 km
- Weather: Temperatures reaching up to 68 °F (20 °C); wind speeds up to 15 miles per hour (24 km/h)

Pole position
- Driver: (Mexico) Adrian Fernández (Fernández Racing)
- Time: 22.176

Fastest lap
- Driver: (Sweden) Kenny Bräck (Target Chip Ganassi Racing)
- Time: 22.998 (on lap 124 of 250)

Podium
- First: (Canada) Paul Tracy (Team KOOL Green)
- Second: (Mexico) Adrian Fernández (Fernández Racing)
- Third: (Italy) Max Papis (Sigma Autosport)

Chronology
Previous	Next
2001	2003

The 2002 Miller Lite 250 was the fourth round of the 2002 CART FedEx Champ Car World Series season, held on June 2, 2002 at the Milwaukee Mile oval in West Allis, Wisconsin.

The winner was Paul Tracy.

== Qualifying results ==
Pos	Nat	Name	Team	Time
1	(Mexico)	Adrian Fernández	Fernández Racing	22.176
2	(Canada)	Paul Tracy	Team KOOL Green	22.205
3	(Canada)	Patrick Carpentier	Team Player's	22.324
4	(New Zealand)	Scott Dixon	Target Chip Ganassi Racing	22.357
5	(Brazil)	Bruno Junqueira	Target Chip Ganassi Racing	22.376
6	(Japan)	Shinji Nakano	Fernández Racing	22.383
7	(Brazil)	Cristiano da Matta	Newman/Haas Racing	22.394
8	(Brazil)	Tony Kanaan	Mo Nunn Racing	22.398
9	(United Kingdom)	Dario Franchitti	Team KOOL Green	22.448
10	(Japan)	Tora Takagi	Walker Racing	22.486
11	(Canada)	Alex Tagliani	Team Player's	22.511
12	(United States)	Jimmy Vasser	Team Rahal	22.542
13	(United States)	Michael Andretti	Team Motorola	22.559
14	(Sweden)	Kenny Bräck	Target Chip Ganassi Racing	22.595
15	(Brazil)	Christian Fittipaldi	Newman/Haas Racing	22.640
16	(Mexico)	Mario Domínguez	Herdez Competition	22.653
17	(Italy)	Max Papis	Sigma Autosport	22.789
18	(Mexico)	Michel Jourdain Jr.	Team Rahal	22.916
19	(United States)	Townsend Bell	Patrick Racing	22.927

== Race ==
Pos	No	Driver	Team	Laps	Time/Retired	Grid	Points
1	26	(Canada) Paul Tracy	Team KOOL Green	250	1:59:27.602	2	21
2	51	(Mexico) Adrian Fernández	Fernández Racing	250	+0.638	1	17
3	22	(Italy) Max Papis	Sigma Autosport	250	+1.719	17	14
4	11	(Brazil) Christian Fittipaldi	Newman/Haas Racing	250	+8.360	15	12
5	9	(Mexico) Michel Jourdain Jr.	Team Rahal	250	+18.016	18	10
6	44	(New Zealand) Scott Dixon	Target Chip Ganassi Racing	250	+18.228	4	8
7	39	(United States) Michael Andretti	Team Motorola	250	+22.030	13	6
8	12	(Sweden) Kenny Bräck	Target Chip Ganassi Racing	250	+22.192	14	5
9	8	(United States) Jimmy Vasser	Team Rahal	249	+ 1 Lap	12	4
10	4	(Brazil) Bruno Junqueira	Target Chip Ganassi Racing	249	+ 1 Lap	5	3
11	6	(Brazil) Cristiano da Matta	Newman/Haas Racing	244	+ 6 Laps	7	2
12	27	(United Kingdom) Dario Franchitti	Team KOOL Green	188	Contact	9	1
13	20	(United States) Townsend Bell	Patrick Racing	131	Contact	19	0
14	5	(Japan) Tora Takagi	Walker Racing	110	Contact	10	0
15	32	(Canada) Patrick Carpentier	Team Player's	100	Electrical	3	0
16	10	(Brazil) Tony Kanaan	Mo Nunn Racing	92	Engine	8	0
17	16	(Mexico) Mario Domínguez	Herdez Competition	74	Fuel system	16	0
18	52	(Japan) Shinji Nakano	Fernández Racing	43	Brakes	6	0
19	33	(Canada) Alex Tagliani	Team Player's	39	Electrical	11	0

== Caution flags ==
Laps	Cause
61-69	Domínguez (16) contact
109-114	Takagi (5) contact
115-119	Andretti (39) spin
181-187	Dixon (44) off line
189-199	Franchitti (27) contact

== Notes ==
Laps	Leader
1-113	Paul Tracy
114-116	Christian Fittipaldi
117-120	Bruno Junqueira
121-179	Kenny Bräck
180-250	Paul Tracy

Driver	Laps led
Paul Tracy	184
Kenny Bräck	59
Bruno Junqueira	4
Christian Fittipaldi	3

- Average Speed 129.583 mph

Previous race: 2002 Bridgestone Potenza 500	CART FedEx Championship Series; 2002 season	Next race: 2002 Bridgestone Grand Prix of Monterey
Previous race: 2001 Miller Lite 225	Milwaukee Mile	Next race: 2003 Milwaukee Mile Centennial 250
