= 2002 Bridgestone Potenza 500 =

(Japan) 2002 Motegi
Race details
- Race 3 of 19 in the 2002 CART season
- Twin Ring Motegi track layout
- Date: April 27, 2002
- Official name: 2002 Bridgestone Potenza 500
- Location: Twin Ring Motegi; Motegi, Tochigi, Japan
- Course: 1.5-mile oval 1.548 mi / 2.491 km
- Distance: 201 laps 311.148 mi / 500.691 km

Pole position
- Driver: (Brazil) Bruno Junqueira (Target Chip Ganassi Racing)
- Time: 25.907

Fastest lap
- Driver: (Brazil) Tony Kanaan (Mo Nunn Racing)
- Time: 26.425 (on lap 31 of 201)

Podium
- First: (Brazil) Bruno Junqueira (Target Chip Ganassi Racing)
- Second: (Canada) Alex Tagliani (Team Player's)
- Third: (United Kingdom) Dario Franchitti (Team KOOL Green)

The 2002 Bridgestone Potenza 500 was the third round of the 2002 CART FedEx Champ Car World Series season, held on April 27, 2002, on the oval at Twin Ring Motegi in Motegi, Japan.

The winner was Bruno Junqueira.

This marked the final Champ Car race for PacWest Racing. It also marked the final time Champ Car would compete in Japan as next years event was contested by the Indy Racing League.

== Qualifying results ==
Pos	Nat	Name	Team	Time
1	(Brazil)	Bruno Junqueira	Target Chip Ganassi Racing	25.907
2	(Brazil)	Tony Kanaan	Mo Nunn Racing	26.051
3	(Canada)	Paul Tracy	Team KOOL Green	26.059
4	(Sweden)	Kenny Bräck	Target Chip Ganassi Racing	26.133
5	(United Kingdom)	Dario Franchitti	Team KOOL Green	26.173
6	(Canada)	Patrick Carpentier	Team Player's	26.206
7	(United States)	Michael Andretti	Team Motorola	26.292
8	(Brazil)	Cristiano da Matta	Newman/Haas Racing	26.300
9	(United States)	Jimmy Vasser	Team Rahal	26.337
10	(United States)	Townsend Bell	Patrick Racing	26.376
11	(Japan)	Tora Takagi	Walker Racing	26.398
12	(Canada)	Alex Tagliani	Team Player's	26.412
13	(Mexico)	Michel Jourdain Jr.	Team Rahal	26.430
14	(Mexico)	Adrian Fernández	Fernández Racing	26.485
15	(New Zealand)	Scott Dixon	PWR Championship Racing	26.502
16	(Brazil)	Christian Fittipaldi	Newman/Haas Racing	26.594
17	(Italy)	Max Papis	Sigma Autosport	26.655
18	(Japan)	Shinji Nakano	Fernández Racing	26.791
19	(Mexico)	Mario Domínguez	Herdez Competition	26.847
20	(Spain)	Oriol Servià	PWR Championship Racing	26.951

== Race ==
Pos	No	Driver	Team	Laps	Time/Retired	Grid	Points
1	4	(Brazil) Bruno Junqueira	Target Chip Ganassi Racing	201	2:00:05.882	1	21
2	33	(Canada) Alex Tagliani	Team Player's	201	+12.282	12	16
3	27	(United Kingdom) Dario Franchitti	Team KOOL Green	200	+ 1 Lap	5	14
4	32	(Canada) Patrick Carpentier	Team Player's	199	+ 2 Laps	6	12
5	9	(Mexico) Michel Jourdain Jr.	Team Rahal	199	+ 2 Laps	13	10
6	17	(Spain) Oriol Servià	PWR Championship Racing	199	+ 2 Laps	20	8
7	51	(Mexico) Adrian Fernández	Fernández Racing	199	+ 2 Laps	14	6
8	5	(Japan) Tora Takagi	Walker Racing	199	+ 2 Laps	11	5
9	7	(New Zealand) Scott Dixon	PWR Championship Racing	198	+ 3 Laps	15	4
10	52	(Japan) Shinji Nakano	Fernández Racing	198	+ 3 Laps	18	3
11	16	(Mexico) Mario Domínguez	Herdez Competition	197	+ 4 Laps	19	2
12	11	(Brazil) Christian Fittipaldi	Newman/Haas Racing	193	+ 8 Laps	16	1
13	6	(Brazil) Cristiano da Matta	Newman/Haas Racing	186	Pulled in	8	0
14	20	(United States) Townsend Bell	Patrick Racing	136	Contact	10	0
15	10	(Brazil) Tony Kanaan	Mo Nunn Racing	121	Engine	2	1
16	39	(United States) Michael Andretti	Team Motorola	115	Gearbox	7	0
17	12	(Sweden) Kenny Bräck	Target Chip Ganassi Racing	101	Engine	4	0
18	22	(Italy) Max Papis	Sigma Autosport	94	Brakes	17	0
19	26	(Canada) Paul Tracy	Team KOOL Green	84	Wheel bearing	3	0
20	8	(United States) Jimmy Vasser	Team Rahal	38	Fire	9	0

== Caution flags ==
Laps	Cause
40-45	Vasser (8) tow-in
90-97	Debris
139-155	Bell (20) contact
157-161	Nakano (52) lost wheel

== Notes ==
Laps	Leader
1-38	Tony Kanaan
39-76	Paul Tracy
77-80	Kenny Bräck
81-83	Michael Andretti
84-100	Tony Kanaan
101	Bruno Junqueira
102-118	Tony Kanaan
119-143	Bruno Junqueira
144-166	Alex Tagliani
167-190	Bruno Junqueira
191-197	Dario Franchitti
198-201	Bruno Junqueira

Driver	Laps led
Tony Kanaan	72
Bruno Junqueira	54
Paul Tracy	38
Alex Tagliani	23
Dario Franchitti	7
Kenny Bräck	4
Michael Andretti	3

- Average Speed 155.447 mph

Previous race: 2002 Toyota Grand Prix of Long Beach	CART FedEx Championship Series; 2002 season	Next race: 2002 Miller Lite 250
Previous race: 2001 Firestone Firehawk 500	2002 Bridgestone Potenza 500	Next race: 2003 Indy Japan 300; IndyCar Series event
