= 2002 Tecate/Telmex Monterrey Grand Prix =

1st round of the 2002 CART season

(Mexico) 2002 Tecate/Telmex Monterrey Grand Prix
Race details
1st round of the 2002 CART season
← Previous race	Next race →
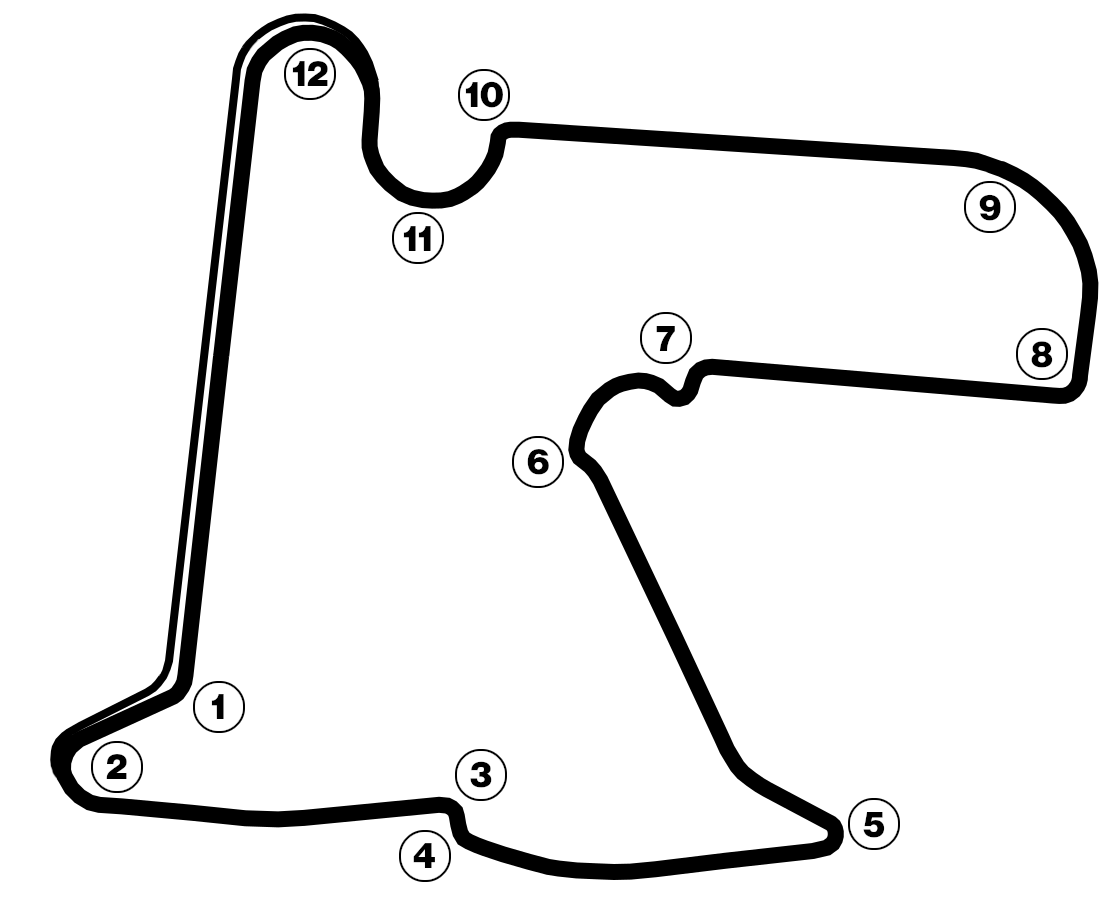
- Layout of the Fundidora Park circuit
- Date: March 10, 2002
- Official name: Tecate/Telmex Monterrey Grand Prix
- Location: Parque Fundidora, Monterrey, Nuevo León, Mexico
- Course: Permanent racing facility 2.104 mi / 3.386 km
- Distance: 85 laps 178.840 mi / 287.810 km

Pole position
- Driver: (Mexico) Adrian Fernández (Fernández Racing)
- Time: 1:18.929

Fastest lap
- Driver: (Brazil) Cristiano da Matta (Newman/Haas Racing)
- Time: 1:15.386 (on lap 74 of 85)

Podium
- First: (Brazil) Cristiano da Matta (Newman/Haas Racing)
- Second: (United Kingdom) Dario Franchitti (Team KOOL Green)
- Third: (Brazil) Christian Fittipaldi (Newman/Haas Racing)

Chronology
Previous	Next
2001	2003

The 2002 Tecate/Telmex Monterrey Grand Prix was the first round of the 2002 CART season. The race was held on March 10, 2002, in Monterrey, Mexico at Parque Fundidora. The race was contested of 85 laps. Cristiano da Matta won the race, marking his second straight win in the event. Dario Franchitti finished 2nd, and Christian Fittipaldi finished 3rd. Michel Jourdain Jr. and Alex Tagliani rounded out the top five, and Scott Dixon, Patrick Carpentier, Paul Tracy, Max Papis, and Oriol Servià rounded out the top ten.

== Qualifying results ==
Pos	Nat	Name	Team	Qual 1	Qual 2	Best
1	(Mexico)	Adrian Fernández	Fernández Racing	1:18.929	1:46.320	1:18.929
2	(United Kingdom)	Dario Franchitti	Team KOOL Green	1:19.202	-	1:19.202
3	(Canada)	Alex Tagliani	Team Player's	1:19.241	1:51.165	1:19.241
4	(Brazil)	Christian Fittipaldi	Newman/Haas Racing	1:19.270	-	1:19.270
5	(Brazil)	Cristiano da Matta	Newman/Haas Racing	1:19.275	-	1:19.275
6	(Mexico)	Michel Jourdain Jr.	Team Rahal	1:19.326	-	1:19.326
7	(Brazil)	Bruno Junqueira	Target Chip Ganassi Racing	1:19.480	-	1:19.480
8	(Sweden)	Kenny Bräck	Target Chip Ganassi Racing	1:19.491	-	1:19.491
9	(United States)	Townsend Bell	Patrick Racing	1:19.682	-	1:19.682
10	(United States)	Jimmy Vasser	Team Rahal	1:19.832	-	1:19.832
11	(Spain)	Oriol Servià	PWR Championship Racing	1:19.878	-	1:19.878
12	(Mexico)	Mario Domínguez	Herdez Competition	1:19.982	-	1:19.982
13	(Brazil)	Tony Kanaan	Mo Nunn Racing	1:19.985	-	1:19.985
14	(New Zealand)	Scott Dixon	PWR Championship Racing	1:20.224	-	1:20.224
15	(Japan)	Tora Takagi	Walker Racing	1:20.400	-	1:20.400
16	(United States)	Michael Andretti	Team Motorola	1:20.473	1:49.075	1:20.473
17	(Canada)	Patrick Carpentier	Team Player's	1:20.712	-	1:20.712
18	(Italy)	Max Papis	Sigma Autosport	1:21.992	-	1:21.992
19	(Canada)	Paul Tracy	Team KOOL Green	1:22.347	-	1:22.347
20	(Japan)	Shinji Nakano	Fernández Racing	1:20.419	-	-*

* Nakano ran his backup car in the qualification 2 session (but was unable to complete a lap), thus forfeiting the qualifying time he set in his primary car on Friday.

== Race ==
Pos	No	Driver	Team	Laps	Time/Retired	Grid	Points
1	6	(Brazil) Cristiano da Matta	Newman/Haas Racing	85	1:58:30.642	5	21
2	27	(United Kingdom) Dario Franchitti	Team KOOL Green	85	+1.679	2	16
3	11	(Brazil) Christian Fittipaldi	Newman/Haas Racing	85	+3.244	4	14
4	9	(Mexico) Michel Jourdain Jr.	Team Rahal	85	+3.785	6	12
5	33	(Canada) Alex Tagliani	Team Player's	85	+7.261	3	10
6	7	(New Zealand) Scott Dixon	PWR Championship Racing	85	+9.427	14	8
7	32	(Canada) Patrick Carpentier	Team Player's	85	+9.937	17	6
8	26	(Canada) Paul Tracy	Team KOOL Green	85	+10.318	19	5
9	22	(Italy) Max Papis	Sigma Autosport	85	+11.076	18	4
10	17	(Spain) Oriol Servià	PWR Championship Racing	85	+12.717	11	3
11	4	(Brazil) Bruno Junqueira	Target Chip Ganassi Racing	84	Off course	7	2
12	39	(United States) Michael Andretti	Team Motorola	84	+ 1 Lap	16	1
13	51	(Mexico) Adrian Fernández	Fernández Racing	84	+ 1 Lap	1	2
14	5	(Japan) Tora Takagi	Walker Racing	83	+ 2 Laps	15	0
15	52	(Japan) Shinji Nakano	Fernández Racing	83	+ 2 Laps	20	0
16	10	(Brazil) Tony Kanaan	Mo Nunn Racing	75	Contact	13	0
17	16	(Mexico) Mario Domínguez	Herdez Competition	23	Mechanical	12	0
18	12	(Sweden) Kenny Bräck	Target Chip Ganassi Racing	1	Contact	8	0
19	20	(United States) Townsend Bell	Patrick Racing	0	Contact	9	0
20	8	(United States) Jimmy Vasser	Team Rahal	0	Contact	10	0

== Caution flags ==
Laps	Cause
1-3	Bell (20), Vasser (8), Junqueira (4) & Bräck (12) contact
77-81	Takagi (5) & Kanaan (10) contact

== Notes ==
Laps	Leader
1-14	Adrian Fernández
15-27	Alex Tagliani
28-31	Patrick Carpentier
32-50	Cristiano da Matta
51	Dario Franchitti
52	Max Papis
53-85	Cristiano da Matta

Driver	Laps led
Cristiano da Matta	52
Adrian Fernández	14
Alex Tagliani	13
Patrick Carpentier	4
Dario Franchitti	1
Max Papis	1

- New Race Lap Record Cristiano da Matta 1:15.386
- New Race Record Cristiano da Matta 1:58:30.642
- Average Speed 90.544 mph
- CART's first race after the departure of Team Penske for the archrival Indy Racing League.

Previous race: 2001 Marlboro 500	CART FedEx Championship Series; 2002 season	Next race: 2002 Toyota Grand Prix of Long Beach
Previous race: 2001 Tecate/Telmex Monterrey Grand Prix	Tecate/Telmex Grand Prix of Monterrey	Next race: 2003 Tecate Telmex Monterrey Grand Prix
