= 2002 Marconi Grand Prix of Cleveland =

(United States) 2002 Cleveland
Race details
- Race 9 of 19 in the 2002 CART season
- Burke Lakefront Airport track layout
- Date: July 14, 2002
- Official name: 2002 Marconi Grand Prix of Cleveland Presented by U.S. Bank
- Location: Burke Lakefront Airport; Cleveland, Ohio, United States
- Course: Temporary airport course 2.106 mi / 3.389 km
- Distance: 115 laps 242.190 mi / 389.735 km
- Weather: Sunny

Pole position
- Driver: (Brazil) Cristiano da Matta (Newman/Haas Racing)
- Time: 57.040

Fastest lap
- Driver: (Canada) Paul Tracy (Team KOOL Green)
- Time: 58.473 (on lap 72 of 115)

Podium
- First: (Canada) Patrick Carpentier (Team Player's)
- Second: (United States) Michael Andretti (Team Motorola)
- Third: (Canada) Paul Tracy (Team KOOL Green)

The 2002 Marconi Grand Prix of Cleveland was the ninth round of the 2002 CART FedEx Champ Car World Series season, held on July 14, 2002 at Burke Lakefront Airport in Cleveland, Ohio, USA.

The major story coming into the race weekend was Cristiano da Matta going for a CART record 5th consecutive win. However, engine failure on lap 20 ended his race. After Dario Franchitti suffered similar engine woes, the lead was turned over to Patrick Carpentier who led all but one of the remaining laps en route to victory.

== Qualifying results ==
Pos	Nat	Name	Team	Qual 1	Qual 2	Best
1	(Brazil)	Cristiano da Matta	Newman/Haas Racing	57.641	57.040	57.040
2	(Canada)	Patrick Carpentier	Team Player's	58.688	57.470	57.470
3	(United Kingdom)	Dario Franchitti	Team KOOL Green	58.515	57.482	57.482
4	(Brazil)	Christian Fittipaldi	Newman/Haas Racing	58.211	57.499	57.499
5	(United States)	Michael Andretti	Team Motorola	58.111	57.645	57.645
6	(Brazil)	Tony Kanaan	Mo Nunn Racing	58.092	57.713	57.713
7	(United States)	Jimmy Vasser	Team Rahal	58.477	57.731	57.731
8	(Brazil)	Bruno Junqueira	Target Chip Ganassi Racing	58.550	57.751	57.751
9	(Sweden)	Kenny Bräck	Target Chip Ganassi Racing	58.713	57.797	57.797
10	(Japan)	Tora Takagi	Walker Racing	58.804	57.798	57.798
11	(Canada)	Paul Tracy	Team KOOL Green	58.648	57.827	57.827
12	(New Zealand)	Scott Dixon	Target Chip Ganassi Racing	58.094	57.913	57.913
13	(Mexico)	Mario Domínguez	Herdez Competition	59.376	58.050	58.050
14	(Canada)	Alex Tagliani	Team Player's	58.757	58.058	58.058
15	(United States)	Townsend Bell	Patrick Racing	58.758	58.304	58.304
16	(Mexico)	Michel Jourdain Jr.	Team Rahal	58.873	58.326	58.326
17	(Mexico)	Adrian Fernández	Fernández Racing	59.297	58.546	58.546
18	(Japan)	Shinji Nakano	Fernández Racing	59.660	58.559	58.559

== Race ==
Pos	No	Driver	Team	Laps	Time/Retired	Grid	Points
1	32	(Canada) Patrick Carpentier	Team Player's	115	2:00:05.785	2	21
2	39	(United States) Michael Andretti	Team Motorola	115	+17.059	5	16
3	26	(Canada) Paul Tracy	Team KOOL Green	115	+28.295	11	14
4	12	(Sweden) Kenny Bräck	Target Chip Ganassi Racing	115	+32.526	9	12
5	33	(Canada) Alex Tagliani	Team Player's	115	+37.152	14	10
6	8	(United States) Jimmy Vasser	Team Rahal	115	+50.604	7	8
7	5	(Japan) Tora Takagi	Walker Racing	115	+51.896	10	6
8	10	(Brazil) Tony Kanaan	Mo Nunn Racing	115	+57.236	6	5
9	9	(Mexico) Michel Jourdain Jr.	Team Rahal	114	+ 1 Lap	16	4
10	52	(Japan) Shinji Nakano	Fernández Racing	114	+ 1 Lap	18	3
11	51	(Mexico) Adrian Fernández	Fernández Racing	111	+ 4 Laps	17	2
12	11	(Brazil) Christian Fittipaldi	Newman/Haas Racing	96	Out of fuel	4	1
13	4	(Brazil) Bruno Junqueira	Target Chip Ganassi Racing	87	Engine	8	0
14	27	(United Kingdom) Dario Franchitti	Team KOOL Green	69	Engine	3	0
15	44	(New Zealand) Scott Dixon	Target Chip Ganassi Racing	27	Drive shaft	12	0
16	6	(Brazil) Cristiano da Matta	Newman/Haas Racing	21	Engine	1	2
17	55	(Mexico) Mario Domínguez	Herdez Competition	1	Contact	13	0
18	20	(United States) Townsend Bell	Patrick Racing	1	Contact	15	0

== Caution flags ==
Laps	Cause
0-1	Yellow start
2-4	Vasser (8), Takagi (8), Bell (20) & Domínguez (55) contact

== Notes ==
Laps	Leader
1-19	Cristiano da Matta
20-48	Dario Franchitti
49-74	Patrick Carpentier
75	Michael Andretti
76-115	Patrick Carpentier

Driver	Laps led
Patrick Carpentier	66
Dario Franchitti	29
Cristiano da Matta	19
Michael Andretti	1

- New race lap record Paul Tracy 58.473
- New race record Patrick Carpentier 2:00:05.785
- Average speed 120.998 mph

Previous race: 2002 Molson Indy Toronto	CART FedEx Championship Series; 2002 season	Next race: 2002 Molson Indy Vancouver
Previous race: 2001 Marconi Grand Prix of Cleveland	2002 Marconi Grand Prix of Cleveland	Next race: 2003 U.S. Bank Cleveland Grand Prix
