= 2002 G.I. Joe's 200 =

(United States) 2002 Portland
Race details
- Race 6 of 19 in the 2002 CART season
- Portland International Raceway track layout
- Date: June 16, 2002
- Official name: 2002 G.I. Joe's 200
- Location: Portland International Raceway; Portland, Oregon, United States
- Course: Permanent road course 1.969 mi / 3.169 km
- Distance: 110 laps 216.590 mi / 348.590 km
- Weather: Mostly Cloudy - Air temp: 18.3°C (65°F)

Pole position
- Driver: (Brazil) Cristiano da Matta (Newman/Haas Racing)
- Time: 58.679

Fastest lap
- Driver: (Brazil) Bruno Junqueira (Target Chip Ganassi Racing)
- Time: 1:00.801 (on lap 108 of 110)

Podium
- First: (Brazil) Cristiano da Matta (Newman/Haas Racing)
- Second: (Brazil) Bruno Junqueira (Target Chip Ganassi Racing)
- Third: (United Kingdom) Dario Franchitti (Team KOOL Green)

The 2002 G.I. Joe's 200 was the sixth round of the 2002 CART FedEx Champ Car World Series season, held on June 16, 2002 at Portland International Raceway in Portland, Oregon.

== Qualifying results ==
Pos	Nat	Name	Team	Qual 1	Qual 2	Best
1	(Brazil)	Cristiano da Matta	Newman/Haas Racing	59.083	58.679	58.679
2	(Sweden)	Kenny Bräck	Target Chip Ganassi Racing	59.168	58.963	58.963
3	(Brazil)	Bruno Junqueira	Target Chip Ganassi Racing	59.506	59.026	59.026
4	(Canada)	Alex Tagliani	Team Player's	59.604	59.185	59.185
5	(Brazil)	Christian Fittipaldi	Newman/Haas Racing	59.215	59.242	59.215
6	(United States)	Townsend Bell	Patrick Racing	59.426	59.226	59.226
7	(United Kingdom)	Dario Franchitti	Team KOOL Green	59.403	59.365	59.365
8	(Japan)	Tora Takagi	Walker Racing	59.476	59.398	59.398
9	(Canada)	Paul Tracy	Team KOOL Green	59.581	59.454	59.454
10	(United States)	Jimmy Vasser	Team Rahal	59.744	59.455	59.455
11	(New Zealand)	Scott Dixon	Target Chip Ganassi Racing	59.479	59.825	59.479
12	(United States)	Michael Andretti	Team Motorola	1:00.177	59.484	59.484
13	(Canada)	Patrick Carpentier	Team Player's	59.785	59.600	59.600
14	(Brazil)	Tony Kanaan	Mo Nunn Racing	1:00.062	59.629	59.629
15	(Mexico)	Adrian Fernández	Fernández Racing	59.650	59.653	59.650
16	(Japan)	Shinji Nakano	Fernández Racing	1:00.579	59.888	59.888
17	(Mexico)	Michel Jourdain Jr.	Team Rahal	59.985	59.978	59.978
18	(Mexico)	Mario Domínguez	Herdez Competition	1:00.968	1:00.583	1:00.583

== Race ==
Pos	No	Driver	Team	Laps	Time/Retired	Grid	Points
1	6	(Brazil) Cristiano da Matta	Newman/Haas Racing	110	2:03:19.113	1	23
2	4	(Brazil) Bruno Junqueira	Target Chip Ganassi Racing	110	+0.625	3	16
3	27	(United Kingdom) Dario Franchitti	Team KOOL Green	110	+7.761	7	14
4	20	(United States) Townsend Bell	Patrick Racing	110	+8.455	6	12
5	32	(Canada) Patrick Carpentier	Team Player's	110	+21.475	13	10
6	9	(Mexico) Michel Jourdain Jr.	Team Rahal	110	+34.991	17	8
7	44	(New Zealand) Scott Dixon	Target Chip Ganassi Racing	110	+39.707	11	6
8	10	(Brazil) Tony Kanaan	Mo Nunn Racing	110	+44.604	14	5
9	39	(United States) Michael Andretti	Team Motorola	110	+56.776	12	4
10	55	(Mexico) Mario Domínguez	Herdez Competition	109	+ 1 Lap	18	3
11	52	(Japan) Shinji Nakano	Fernández Racing	109	+ 1 Lap	16	2
12	33	(Canada) Alex Tagliani	Team Player's	109	+ 1 Lap	4	1
13	11	(Brazil) Christian Fittipaldi	Newman/Haas Racing	93	Suspension	5	0
14	51	(Mexico) Adrian Fernández	Fernández Racing	86	Contact	15	0
15	12	(Sweden) Kenny Bräck	Target Chip Ganassi Racing	60	Wheel	2	0
16	8	(United States) Jimmy Vasser	Team Rahal	48	Engine	10	0
17	26	(Canada) Paul Tracy	Team KOOL Green	33	Contact	9	0
18	5	(Japan) Tora Takagi	Walker Racing	12	Contact	8	0

== Caution flags ==
Laps	Cause
1-2	Yellow start
4-6	Dixon (44), Fernández (51) & Takagi (5) contact
61-63	Bräck (12) mechanical

== Notes ==
Laps	Leader
1-3	Cristiano da Matta
4-29	Kenny Bräck
30	Cristiano da Matta
31-59	Kenny Bräck
60-110	Cristiano da Matta

Driver	Laps led
Cristiano da Matta	55
Kenny Bräck	55

- New Race Record Cristiano da Matta 2:03:19.113
- Average Speed 105.381 mph

Previous race: 2002 Bridgestone Grand Prix of Monterey	CART FedEx Championship Series; 2002 season	Next race: 2002 CART Grand Prix of Chicago
Previous race: 2001 Freightliner/G.I. Joe's 200	2002 G.I. Joe's 200	Next race: 2003 G.I. Joe's 200
