= 2002 CART Grand Prix of Chicago =

(United States) 2002 Chicago
Race details
- Race 7 of 19 in the 2002 CART season
- Date: June 30, 2002
- Official name: 2002 CART Grand Prix of Chicago
- Location: Chicago Motor Speedway, Cicero, Illinois, United States
- Course: 1 Mile Oval; 1.029 mi / 1.656 km
- Distance: 250 laps 257.250 mi / 414.000 km
- Weather: 93 degrees Fahrenheit (33.8 Celsius), 50% humidity, partly cloudy

Pole position
- Driver: (United Kingdom) Dario Franchitti (Team Green)
- Time: 23.428

Fastest lap
- Driver: (Canada) Paul Tracy (Team Green)
- Time: 24.192 (on lap 230 of 250)

Podium
- First: (Brazil) Cristiano da Matta (Newman/Haas Racing)
- Second: (Brazil) Bruno Junqueira (Chip Ganassi Racing)
- Third: (United Kingdom) Dario Franchitti (Team Green)

The 2002 CART Grand Prix of Chicago was the seventh round of the 2002 CART FedEx Champ Car World Series season, held on June 30, 2002, at the Chicago Motor Speedway in Cicero, Illinois, this was the fourth and final running of the event. 26,000 attended the race. Cristiano da Matta of Newman/Haas Racing, the championship leader going into the event, won the race from the third position. Chip Ganassi Racing's Bruno Junqueira finished in second and Team Green driver Dario Franchitti came in third after winning the eleventh pole position of his career in qualifying.

== Qualifying results ==
Pos	Nat	Name	Team	Time
1	(United Kingdom)	Dario Franchitti	Team Green	23.428
2	(Canada)	Alex Tagliani	Forsythe Racing	23.434
3	(Brazil)	Cristiano da Matta	Newman/Haas Racing	23.443
4	(Brazil)	Tony Kanaan	Mo Nunn Racing	23.526
5	(Brazil)	Bruno Junqueira	Chip Ganassi Racing	23.545
6	(Mexico)	Adrian Fernández	Fernández Racing	23.611
7	(Canada)	Patrick Carpentier	Forsythe Racing	23.629
8	(Japan)	Tora Takagi	Walker Racing	23.674
9	(New Zealand)	Scott Dixon	Chip Ganassi Racing	23.723
10	(United States)	Jimmy Vasser	Team Rahal	23.732
11	(Brazil)	Christian Fittipaldi	Newman/Haas Racing	23.785
12	(Sweden)	Kenny Bräck	Chip Ganassi Racing	23.791
13	(Canada)	Paul Tracy	Team Green	23.847
14	(United States)	Michael Andretti	Team Motorola	23.884
15	(Mexico)	Mario Domínguez	Herdez Competition	23.890
16	(Japan)	Shinji Nakano	Fernández Racing	23.905
17	(United States)	Townsend Bell	Patrick Racing	24.174
18	(Mexico)	Michel Jourdain Jr.	Team Rahal	24.319

== Race ==
Pos	No	Driver	Team	Laps	Time/Retired	Grid	Points
1	6	(Brazil) Cristiano da Matta	Newman/Haas Racing	250	2:07:00.698	3	21
2	4	(Brazil) Bruno Junqueira	Chip Ganassi Racing	250	+0.639	5	16
3	27	(United Kingdom) Dario Franchitti	Team Green	250	+3.444	1	15
4	5	(Japan) Tora Takagi	Walker Racing	250	+11.992	8	12
5	52	(Japan) Shinji Nakano	Fernández Racing	250	+12.458	16	10
6	44	(New Zealand) Scott Dixon	Chip Ganassi Racing	250	+12.970	9	8
7	33	(Canada) Alex Tagliani	Forsythe Racing	249	+ 1 Lap	2	6
8	10	(Brazil) Tony Kanaan	Mo Nunn Racing	249	+ 1 Lap	4	5
9	26	(Canada) Paul Tracy	Team Green	249	+ 1 Lap	13	4
10	9	(Mexico) Michel Jourdain Jr.	Team Rahal	249	+ 1 Lap	18	3
11	55	(Mexico) Mario Domínguez	Herdez Competition	249	+ 1 Lap	15	2
12	20	(United States) Townsend Bell	Patrick Racing	248	+ 2 Laps	17	1
13	51	(Mexico) Adrian Fernández	Fernández Racing	241	+ 9 Laps	6	0
14	11	(Brazil) Christian Fittipaldi	Newman/Haas Racing	141	Lost wheel	11	0
15	39	(United States) Michael Andretti	Team Motorola	79	Engine	14	0
16	32	(Canada) Patrick Carpentier	Forsythe Racing	48	Gearbox	7	0
17	8	(United States) Jimmy Vasser	Team Rahal	0	Contact	10	0
18	12	(Sweden) Kenny Bräck	Chip Ganassi Racing	0	Contact	12	0

== Caution flags ==
Laps	Cause
1-12	Vasser (8) & Bräck (12) contact
13	No restart
142-155	Fittipaldi (11) lost wheel
157-161	Tracy (26) & Tagliani (33) contact, spin
163-167	Bell (20) & Jourdain Jr. (9) contact

== Notes ==
Laps	Leader
1-67	Dario Franchitti
68	Alex Tagliani
69-72	Michel Jourdain Jr.
73-75	Christian Fittipaldi
76-133	Alex Tagliani
134-136	Cristiano da Matta
137-141	Christian Fittipaldi
142-204	Cristiano da Matta
205-214	Shinji Nakano
215-234	Alex Tagliani
235-250	Cristiano da Matta

Driver	Laps led
Cristiano da Matta	82
Alex Tagliani	79
Dario Franchitti	67
Shinji Nakano	10
Christian Fittipaldi	8
Michel Jourdain Jr.	4

- New Race Record Cristiano da Matta 2:07:00.698
- Average Speed 121.524 mph

Previous race: 2002 G.I. Joe's 200	CART FedEx Championship Series; 2002 season	Next race: 2002 Molson Indy Toronto
Previous race: 2001 Target Grand Prix	2002 CART Grand Prix of Chicago	Next race: Final Event
