= 2002 Gran Premio Telmex-Gigante =

Final round of the 2002 CART FedEx Champ Car World Series

2002 Mexico City
Race details
- Race 19 of 19 in the 2002 CART season
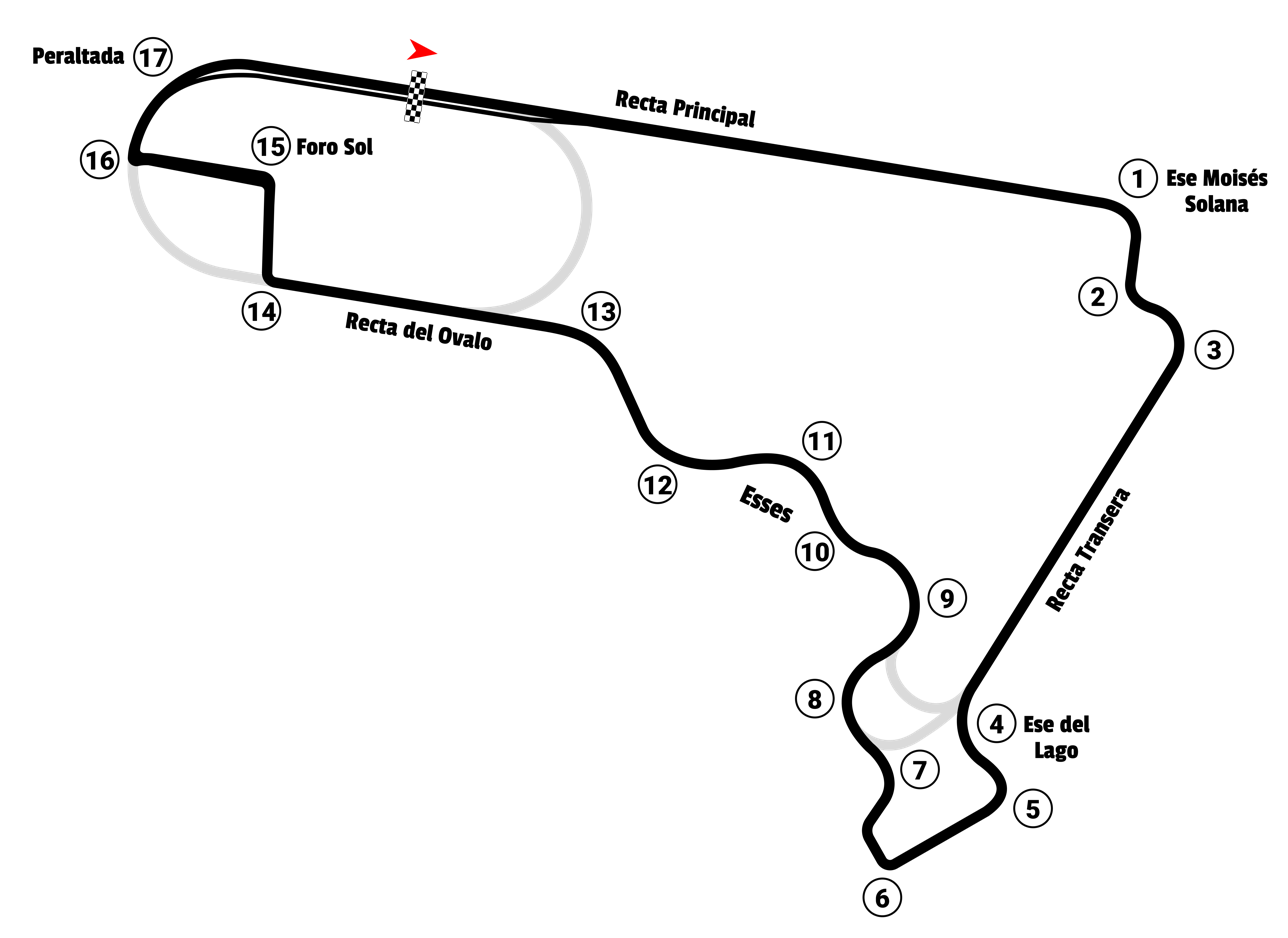
- Autódromo Hermanos Rodríguez track layout
- Date: November 17, 2002
- Official name: 2002 Gran Premio Telmex-Gigante Presented by Banamex/Visa
- Location: Autódromo Hermanos Rodríguez; Mexico City, Mexico
- Course: Permanent Road Course; 2.786 mi / 4.484 km
- Distance: 73 laps 203.378 mi / 327.332 km
- Weather: Hazy

Pole position
- Driver: (Brazil) Bruno Junqueira (Target Chip Ganassi Racing)
- Time: 1:25.941

Fastest lap
- Driver: (Japan) Shinji Nakano (Fernández Racing)
- Time: 1:27.248 (on lap 70 of 73)

Podium
- First: (Sweden) Kenny Bräck (Target Chip Ganassi Racing)
- Second: (Brazil) Cristiano da Matta (Newman/Haas Racing)
- Third: (Brazil) Bruno Junqueira (Target Chip Ganassi Racing)

The 2002 Gran Premio Telmex-Gigante was the nineteenth and final round of the 2002 CART FedEx Champ Car World Series season, held on November 17, 2002, at the Autódromo Hermanos Rodríguez in Mexico City, Mexico. It was the first Champ Car race at the track since the 1981 season. The race preceded a mass exodus of significant drivers and teams who all competed in their final Champ Car event, most of whom knew beforehand that they would not return. Most rued the fact that they were leaving for the rival Indy Racing League, wishing to continue in CART rather than endure a more stable future in the IRL. CART's winningest driver (42 wins), Michael Andretti, along with Kenny Brack, Scott Dixon, Dario Franchitti, Tony Kanaan, and Japan's most successful driver in U.S. open wheel racing Tora Takagi would all bid CART adieu in favor of the IRL. Other entities leaving CART included 1996-1999 champions Chip Ganassi Racing, 1995 champions Team KOOL Green, and Mo Nunn Racing permanently switched to the IRL, and Japanese automotive industry giants Honda and Toyota likewise left CART for the IRL. Season champion Cristiano da Matta was set to leave CART for Formula One with his engine supplier's F1 team, and Christian Fittipaldi attempted a stock car career.

== Qualifying results ==
Pos	Nat	Name	Team	Qual 1	Qual 2	Best
1	(Brazil)	Bruno Junqueira	Target Chip Ganassi Racing	1:25.941	1:26.126	1:25.941
2	(Brazil)	Christian Fittipaldi	Newman/Haas Racing	1:26.027	1:27.670	1:26.027
3	(United Kingdom)	Dario Franchitti	Team KOOL Green	1:26.147	1:26.891	1:26.147
4	(Brazil)	Tony Kanaan	Mo Nunn Racing	1:26.719	1:26.394	1:26.394
5	(United States)	Jimmy Vasser	Team Rahal	1:26.703	—	1:26.703
6	(Sweden)	Kenny Bräck	Target Chip Ganassi Racing	1:27.147	1:26.786	1:26.786
7	(Canada)	Patrick Carpentier	Team Player's	1:26.904	1:27.322	1:26.904
8	(Canada)	Paul Tracy	Team KOOL Green	1:26.971	1:27.573	1:26.971
9	(Mexico)	Mario Domínguez	Herdez Competition	1:27.344	1:26.975	1:26.975
10	(United States)	Michael Andretti	Team Motorola	1:27.355	1:27.053	1:27.053
11	(Japan)	Tora Takagi	Walker Racing	1:27.144	1:27.150	1:27.144
12	(Brazil)	Cristiano da Matta	Newman/Haas Racing	1:27.174	1:27.405	1:27.174
13	(Japan)	Shinji Nakano	Fernández Racing	1:27.245	1:27.919	1:27.245
14	(Canada)	Alex Tagliani	Team Player's	1:27.483	1:27.437	1:27.437
15	(New Zealand)	Scott Dixon	Target Chip Ganassi Racing	1:27.525	1:27.447	1:27.447
16	(Spain)	Oriol Servià	Patrick Racing	1:29.659	1:27.727	1:27.727
17	(Mexico)	Michel Jourdain Jr.	Team Rahal	1:27.923	1:27.807	1:27.807
18	(Germany)	André Lotterer	Dale Coyne Racing	1:28.058	1:27.898	1:27.898
19	(Mexico)	Luis Díaz	Fernández Racing	1:27.992	1:27.969	1:27.969

== Race ==
Pos	No	Driver	Team	Laps	Time/Retired	Grid	Points
1	12	(Sweden) Kenny Bräck	Target Chip Ganassi Racing	73	1:56:48.475	6	20
2	1	(Brazil) Cristiano da Matta	Newman/Haas Racing	73	+3.987 secs	12	16
3	4	(Brazil) Bruno Junqueira	Target Chip Ganassi Racing	73	+5.073 secs	1	16
4	32	(Canada) Patrick Carpentier	Team Player's	73	+10.842 secs	7	12
5	27	(United Kingdom) Dario Franchitti	Team KOOL Green	73	+12.548 secs	3	10
6	5	(Japan) Tora Takagi	Walker Racing	73	+16.762 secs	11	8
7	44	(New Zealand) Scott Dixon	Target Chip Ganassi Racing	73	+23.622 secs	15	6
8	10	(Brazil) Tony Kanaan	Mo Nunn Racing	73	+25.846 secs	4	6
9	20	(Spain) Oriol Servià	Patrick Racing	73	+28.034 secs	16	4
10	33	(Canada) Alex Tagliani	Team Player's	73	+29.949 secs	14	3
11	8	(United States) Jimmy Vasser	Team Rahal	73	+30.628 secs	5	2
12	19	(Germany) André Lotterer	Dale Coyne Racing	73	+31.426 secs	18	1
13	9	(Mexico) Michel Jourdain Jr.	Team Rahal	73	+32.055 secs	17	0
14	52	(Japan) Shinji Nakano	Fernández Racing	73	+50.219 secs	13	0
15	11	(Brazil) Christian Fittipaldi	Newman/Haas Racing	67	Engine	2	0
16	26	(Canada) Paul Tracy	Team KOOL Green	61	Suspension	8	0
17	39	(United States) Michael Andretti	Team Motorola	50	Contact	10	0
18	55	(Mexico) Mario Domínguez	Herdez Competition	16	Suspension	9	0
19	51	(Mexico) Luis Díaz	Fernández Racing	1	Engine	19	0

== Caution flags ==
Laps	Cause
1-2	Tracy (26) & Vasser (8) contact
51-55	Andretti (39) contact

== Notes ==
Laps	Leader
1-40	Tony Kanaan
41-52	Dario Franchitti
53-61	Michel Jourdain Jr.
62-73	Kenny Bräck

Driver	Laps led
Tony Kanaan	40
Kenny Bräck	12
Dario Franchitti	12
Michel Jourdain Jr.	9

- New Track Record Bruno Junqueira 1:25.941 (Qualification session #1)
- New Race Record Kenny Bräck 1:56:48.475
- Average Speed 104.468 mph

Previous race: 2002 The 500	CART FedEx Championship Series; 2002 season	Next race: 2003 Grand Prix of St. Petersburg; Next season
Previous race: 1981 Copa México 150	2002 Gran Premio Telmex-Gigante	Next race: 2003 Gran Premio Telmex-Gigante
