= 2002 CART Grand Prix of Mid-Ohio =

(United States) 2002 Mid-Ohio
Race details
- Race 11 of 19 in the 2002 CART season
- Mid-Ohio Sports Car Course track layout
- Date: August 11, 2002
- Official name: 2002 CART Grand Prix of Mid-Ohio
- Location: Mid-Ohio Sports Car Course, Lexington, Ohio, United States
- Course: Permanent road course 2.258 mi / 3.634 km
- Distance: 92 laps 207.736 mi / 334.328 km
- Weather: Sunny and warm

Pole position
- Driver: (Canada) Patrick Carpentier (Team Player's)
- Time: 1:06.128

Fastest lap
- Driver: (Brazil) Cristiano da Matta (Newman/Haas Racing)
- Time: 1:07.966 (on lap 67 of 92)

Podium
- First: (Canada) Patrick Carpentier (Team Player's)
- Second: (Brazil) Christian Fittipaldi (Newman/Haas Racing)
- Third: (United States) Michael Andretti (Team Motorola)

The 2002 CART Grand Prix of Mid-Ohio was the eleventh round of the 2002 CART FedEx Champ Car World Series season, held on August 11, 2002 at the Mid-Ohio Sports Car Course in Lexington, Ohio.

== Qualifying results ==
Pos	Nat	Name	Team	Qual 1	Qual 2	Best
1	(Canada)	Patrick Carpentier	Team Player's	1:07.040	1:06.128	1:06.128
2	(Brazil)	Christian Fittipaldi	Newman/Haas Racing	1:07.436	1:06.263	1:06.263
3	(Brazil)	Cristiano da Matta	Newman/Haas Racing	1:07.095	1:06.394	1:06.394
4	(Sweden)	Kenny Bräck	Target Chip Ganassi Racing	1:07.828	1:06.434	1:06.434
5	(Brazil)	Tony Kanaan	Mo Nunn Racing	1:07.515	1:06.631	1:06.631
6	(Brazil)	Bruno Junqueira	Target Chip Ganassi Racing	1:07.928	1:06.714	1:06.714
7	(Canada)	Alex Tagliani	Team Player's	1:07.440	1:06.722	1:06.722
8	(United States)	Michael Andretti	Team Motorola	1:07.714	1:06.822	1:06.822
9	(Canada)	Paul Tracy	Team KOOL Green	1:08.784	1:06.867	1:06.867
10	(Japan)	Tora Takagi	Walker Racing	1:07.740	1:06.897	1:06.897
11	(United Kingdom)	Dario Franchitti	Team KOOL Green	1:07.958	1:06.961	1:06.961
12	(Spain)	Oriol Servià	Patrick Racing	1:08.087	1:07.058	1:07.058
13	(United States)	Jimmy Vasser	Team Rahal	1:07.992	1:07.177	1:07.177
14	(Italy)	Max Papis	Fernández Racing	1:08.815	1:07.410	1:07.410
15	(New Zealand)	Scott Dixon	Target Chip Ganassi Racing	1:07.668	1:07.520	1:07.520
16	(Mexico)	Michel Jourdain Jr.	Team Rahal	1:09.068	1:07.570	1:07.570
17	(Japan)	Shinji Nakano	Fernández Racing	1:09.031	1:07.905	1:07.905
18	(Mexico)	Mario Domínguez	Herdez Competition	1:08.404	1:08.236	1:08.236

== Race ==
Pos	No	Driver	Team	Laps	Time/Retired	Grid	Points
1	32	(Canada) Patrick Carpentier	Team Player's	92	1:56:17.573	1	23
2	11	(Brazil) Christian Fittipaldi	Newman/Haas Racing	92	+3.213	2	16
3	39	(United States) Michael Andretti	Team Motorola	92	+4.733	8	14
4	4	(Brazil) Bruno Junqueira	Target Chip Ganassi Racing	92	+5.733	6	12
5	44	(New Zealand) Scott Dixon	Target Chip Ganassi Racing	92	+8.586	15	10
6	12	(Sweden) Kenny Bräck	Target Chip Ganassi Racing	92	+15.513	4	8
7	33	(Canada) Alex Tagliani	Team Player's	92	+19.854	7	6
8	8	(United States) Jimmy Vasser	Team Rahal	92	+23.241	13	5
9	52	(Japan) Shinji Nakano	Fernández Racing	92	+24.166	17	4
10	20	(Spain) Oriol Servià	Patrick Racing	92	+26.371	12	3
11	9	(Mexico) Michel Jourdain Jr.	Team Rahal	92	+29.564	16	2
12	5	(Japan) Tora Takagi	Walker Racing	92	+30.526	10	1
13	6	(Brazil) Cristiano da Matta	Newman/Haas Racing	91	+ 1 Lap	3	0
14	10	(Brazil) Tony Kanaan	Mo Nunn Racing	78	Gearbox	5	0
15	51	(Italy) Max Papis	Fernández Racing	47	Gearbox	14	0
16	55	(Mexico) Mario Domínguez	Herdez Competition	46	Contact	18	0
17	27	(United Kingdom) Dario Franchitti	Team KOOL Green	38	Engine	11	0
18	26	(Canada) Paul Tracy	Team KOOL Green	23	Engine	9	0

== Caution flags ==
Laps	Cause
47-51	Domínguez (55) contact
52	No restart
69-72	da Matta (6) off course

== Notes ==
Laps	Leader
1-25	Patrick Carpentier
26	Christian Fittipaldi
27-47	Patrick Carpentier
48	Cristiano da Matta
49-69	Patrick Carpentier
70	Christian Fittipaldi
71-92	Patrick Carpentier

Driver	Laps led
Patrick Carpentier	89
Christian Fittipaldi	2
Cristiano da Matta	1

- New Race Record Patrick Carpentier 1:56:17.573
- Average Speed 106.680 mph

Previous race: 2002 Molson Indy Vancouver	CART FedEx Championship Series; 2002 season	Next race: 2002 Grand Prix at Road America
Previous race: 2001 Miller Lite 200	2002 CART Grand Prix of Mid-Ohio	Next race: 2003 Champ Car Grand Prix of Mid-Ohio
