= 2002 Molson Indy Toronto =

(Canada) 2002 Toronto
Race details
- Race 8 of 19 in the 2002 CART season
- Exhibition Place track layout
- Date: July 7, 2002
- Official name: 2002 Molson Indy Toronto
- Location: Exhibition Place; Toronto, Ontario, Canada
- Course: Temporary street course 1.755 mi / 2.824 km
- Distance: 112 laps 196.560 mi / 316.288 km
- Weather: Partly cloudy

Pole position
- Driver: (Brazil) Cristiano da Matta (Newman/Haas Racing)
- Time: 58.135

Fastest lap
- Driver: (Brazil) Cristiano da Matta (Newman/Haas Racing)
- Time: 58.806 (on lap 108 of 112)

Podium
- First: (Brazil) Cristiano da Matta (Newman/Haas Racing)
- Second: (Sweden) Kenny Bräck (Target Chip Ganassi Racing)
- Third: (Brazil) Christian Fittipaldi (Newman/Haas Racing)

The 2002 Molson Indy Toronto was the eighth round of the 2002 CART FedEx Champ Car World Series season, held on July 7, 2002, on the streets of Exhibition Place in Toronto, Ontario, Canada.

== Qualifying results ==
Pos	Nat	Name	Team	Qual 1	Qual 2	Best
1	(Brazil)	Cristiano da Matta	Newman/Haas Racing	58.487	58.135	58.135
2	(Canada)	Paul Tracy	Team KOOL Green	58.953	58.172	58.172
3	(Brazil)	Bruno Junqueira	Target Chip Ganassi Racing	58.724	58.256	58.256
4	(Sweden)	Kenny Bräck	Target Chip Ganassi Racing	58.984	58.334	58.334
5	(Brazil)	Christian Fittipaldi	Newman/Haas Racing	59.082	58.477	58.477
6	(United Kingdom)	Dario Franchitti	Team KOOL Green	59.016	58.488	58.488
7	(Japan)	Shinji Nakano	Fernández Racing	59.400	58.554	58.554
8	(United States)	Jimmy Vasser	Team Rahal	59.102	58.577	58.577
9	(New Zealand)	Scott Dixon	Target Chip Ganassi Racing	59.034	58.677	58.677
10	(Brazil)	Tony Kanaan	Mo Nunn Racing	59.379	58.706	58.706
11	(Canada)	Alex Tagliani	Team Player's	59.390	58.864	58.864
12	(Japan)	Tora Takagi	Walker Racing	59.935	58.930	58.930
13	(Mexico)	Adrian Fernández	Fernández Racing	59.479	59.051	59.051
14	(Canada)	Patrick Carpentier	Team Player's	59.359	59.108	59.108
15	(Mexico)	Michel Jourdain Jr.	Team Rahal	59.585	59.146	59.146
16	(United States)	Townsend Bell	Patrick Racing	59.484	59.293	59.293
17	(Mexico)	Mario Domínguez	Herdez Competition	59.719	59.673	59.673
18	(United States)	Michael Andretti	Team Motorola	59.760	59.981	59.760

== Race ==
Pos	No	Driver	Team	Laps	Time/Retired	Grid	Points
1	6	(Brazil) Cristiano da Matta	Newman/Haas Racing	112	2:06:19.372	1	23
2	12	(Sweden) Kenny Bräck	Target Chip Ganassi Racing	112	+4.398	4	16
3	11	(Brazil) Christian Fittipaldi	Newman/Haas Racing	112	+11.357	5	14
4	52	(Japan) Shinji Nakano	Fernández Racing	112	+12.475	7	12
5	44	(New Zealand) Scott Dixon	Target Chip Ganassi Racing	112	+14.102	9	10
6	8	(United States) Jimmy Vasser	Team Rahal	112	+23.942	8	8
7	33	(Canada) Alex Tagliani	Team Player's	112	+24.423	11	6
8	5	(Japan) Tora Takagi	Walker Racing	112	+38.647	12	5
9	51	(Mexico) Adrian Fernández	Fernández Racing	111	+ 1 Lap	13	4
10	32	(Canada) Patrick Carpentier	Team Player's	111	+ 1 Lap	14	3
11	39	(United States) Michael Andretti	Team Motorola	110	+ 2 Laps	18	2
12	9	(Mexico) Michel Jourdain Jr.	Team Rahal	109	+ 3 Laps	15	1
13	27	(United Kingdom) Dario Franchitti	Team KOOL Green	101	Mechanical	6	0
14	4	(Brazil) Bruno Junqueira	Target Chip Ganassi Racing	92	Contact	3	0
15	20	(United States) Townsend Bell	Patrick Racing	92	Excluded*	16	0
16	26	(Canada) Paul Tracy	Team KOOL Green	88	Brakes	2	0
17	10	(Brazil) Tony Kanaan	Mo Nunn Racing	60	Gearbox	10	0
18	55	(Mexico) Mario Domínguez	Herdez Competition	29	Engine	17	0

* Townsend Bell was excluded from the race after making contact with Bruno Junqueira on lap 93. He was fined $10,000 and placed on probation.

== Caution flags ==
Laps	Cause
0-1	Yellow start
62-70	Kanaan (10) stopped on course
87-90	Tracy (26) contact
93-95	Junqueira (4) & Bell (20) contact

== Notes ==
Laps / Leader; 1-112 / Cristiano da Matta	Driver / Laps led; Cristiano da Matta / 112

- New Race Record Cristiano da Matta 2:06:19.372
- Average Speed 93.361 mph

Previous race: 2002 CART Grand Prix of Chicago	CART FedEx Championship Series; 2002 season	Next race: 2002 Marconi Grand Prix of Cleveland
Previous race: 2001 Molson Indy Toronto	2002 Molson Indy Toronto	Next race: 2003 Molson Indy Toronto
