= 2002 Grand Prix Americas =

(United States) 2002 Miami
Race details
- Race 16 of 19 in the 2002 CART season
- Date: October 6, 2002
- Official name: 2002 Grand Prix Americas
- Location: Bayfront Park; Miami, Florida, United States
- Course: Temporary Street Circuit; 1.387 mi / 2.232 km
- Distance: 105 laps 145.635 mi / 234.360 km
- Weather: Partly cloudy with temperatures reaching up to 88 °F (31 °C); wind speeds approaching 12 miles per hour (19 km/h)

Pole position
- Driver: (Brazil) Tony Kanaan (Mo Nunn Racing)
- Time: 1:01.264

Fastest lap
- Driver: (Brazil) Christian Fittipaldi (Newman/Haas Racing)
- Time: 1:02.906 (on lap 34 of 105)

Podium
- First: (Brazil) Cristiano da Matta (Newman/Haas Racing)
- Second: (Brazil) Christian Fittipaldi (Newman/Haas Racing)
- Third: (United States) Jimmy Vasser (Team Rahal)

The 2002 Grand Prix Americas was the sixteenth round of the 2002 CART FedEx Champ Car World Series season, held on October 6, 2002, on the Bayfront Park street circuit in Miami, Florida. Cristiano da Matta won the race and clinched the season championship.

== Qualifying results ==
| Pos | Nat | Name | Team | Qual 1 | Qual 2 | Best |
|---|---|---|---|---|---|---|
| 1 | (Brazil) | Tony Kanaan | Mo Nunn Racing | 1:01.264 | - | 1:01.264 |
| 2 | (New Zealand) | Scott Dixon | Target Chip Ganassi Racing | 1:01.444 | 1:09.786 | 1:01.444 |
| 3 | (Japan) | Tora Takagi | Walker Racing | 1:02.039 | 1:12.188 | 1:02.039 |
| 4 | (Sweden) | Kenny Bräck | Target Chip Ganassi Racing | 1:02.165 | 1:11.397 | 1:02.165 |
| 5 | (Canada) | Alex Tagliani | Team Player's | 1:02.304 | 1:13.479 | 1:02.304 |
| 6 | (Brazil) | Cristiano da Matta | Newman/Haas Racing | 1:02.348 | 1:11.346 | 1:02.348 |
| 7 | (United Kingdom) | Dario Franchitti | Team KOOL Green | 1:02.369 | 1:20.566 | 1:02.369 |
| 8 | (Brazil) | Christian Fittipaldi | Newman/Haas Racing | 1:02.523 | 1:10.497 | 1:02.523 |
| 9 | (Mexico) | Adrian Fernández | Fernández Racing | 1:02.543 | 1:12.526 | 1:02.543 |
| 10 | (Brazil) | Bruno Junqueira | Target Chip Ganassi Racing | 1:02.607 | 1:13.579 | 1:02.607 |
| 11 | (Japan) | Shinji Nakano | Fernández Racing | 1:02.750 | 1:14.896 | 1:02.750 |
| 12 | (United States) | Jimmy Vasser | Team Rahal | 1:02.860 | 1:11.460 | 1:02.860 |
| 13 | (Spain) | Oriol Servià | Patrick Racing | 1:02.891 | 1:11.831 | 1:02.891 |
| 14 | (United States) | Michael Andretti | Team Motorola | 1:03.052 | 1:15.396 | 1:03.052 |
| 15 | (Mexico) | Michel Jourdain Jr. | Team Rahal | 1:03.055 | 1:12.401 | 1:03.055 |
| 16 | (Canada) | Paul Tracy | Team KOOL Green | 1:03.134 | 1:20.563 | 1:03.134 |
| 17 | (Canada) | Patrick Carpentier | Team Player's | 1:04.135 | 1:13.974 | 1:04.135 |
| 18 | (Mexico) | Mario Domínguez | Herdez Competition | 1:04.326 | 1:11.318 | 1:04.326 |

== Race ==
| Pos | No | Driver | Team | Laps | Time/Retired | Grid | Points |
|---|---|---|---|---|---|---|---|
| 1 | 6 | (Brazil) Cristiano da Matta | Newman/Haas Racing | 105 | 2:07:09.003 | 6 | 21 |
| 2 | 11 | (Brazil) Christian Fittipaldi | Newman/Haas Racing | 105 | +0.734 | 8 | 16 |
| 3 | 8 | (United States) Jimmy Vasser | Team Rahal | 105 | +1.343 | 12 | 14 |
| 4 | 33 | (Canada) Alex Tagliani | Team Player's | 105 | +2.597 | 5 | 12 |
| 5 | 4 | (Brazil) Bruno Junqueira | Target Chip Ganassi Racing | 105 | +15.548 | 10 | 10 |
| 6 | 9 | (Mexico) Michel Jourdain Jr. | Team Rahal | 104 | + 1 Lap | 15 | 8 |
| 7 | 51 | (Mexico) Adrian Fernández | Fernández Racing | 104 | + 1 Lap | 9 | 6 |
| 8 | 39 | (United States) Michael Andretti | Team Motorola | 103 | Contact | 14 | 5 |
| 9 | 10 | (Brazil) Tony Kanaan | Mo Nunn Racing | 103 | Contact | 1 | 5 |
| 10 | 27 | (United Kingdom) Dario Franchitti | Team KOOL Green | 103 | + 2 Laps | 7 | 3 |
| 11 | 55 | (Mexico) Mario Domínguez | Herdez Competition | 99 | + 6 Laps | 18 | 2 |
| 12 | 26 | (Canada) Paul Tracy | Team KOOL Green | 98 | Contact | 16 | 1 |
| 13 | 12 | (Sweden) Kenny Bräck | Target Chip Ganassi Racing | 70 | Differential | 4 | 0 |
| 14 | 52 | (Japan) Shinji Nakano | Fernández Racing | 66 | Fire | 11 | 0 |
| 15 | 5 | (Japan) Tora Takagi | Walker Racing | 39 | Gearbox | 3 | 0 |
| 16 | 32 | (Canada) Patrick Carpentier | Team Player's | 34 | Contact | 17 | 0 |
| 17 | 20 | (Spain) Oriol Servià | Patrick Racing | 29 | Suspension | 13 | 0 |
| 18 | 44 | (New Zealand) Scott Dixon | Target Chip Ganassi Racing | 19 | Contact | 2 | 1 |

== Caution flags ==
| Laps | Cause |
|---|---|
| 1-2 | Servià (20) spin on course |
| 3-5 | Domínguez (55) & Carpentier (32) contact |
| 19-23 | Kanaan (10) & Dixon (44) contact |
| 90-92 | Franchitti (27) contact |
| 94-95 | Junqueira (4) & Kanaan (10) off course |
| 99-100 | Vasser (8), Jourdain (9) & Tracy (26) contact |

== Notes ==
| Laps | Leader |
|---|---|
| 1-23 | Tony Kanaan |
| 24-41 | Cristiano da Matta |
| 42-45 | Paul Tracy |
| 46-61 | Bruno Junqueira |
| 62-83 | Cristiano da Matta |
| 84-87 | Paul Tracy |
| 88-105 | Cristiano da Matta |

| Driver | Laps led |
|---|---|
| Cristiano da Matta | 58 |
| Tony Kanaan | 23 |
| Bruno Junqueira | 16 |
| Paul Tracy | 8 |

- New Track Record Tony Kanaan 1:01.264 (Qualifying Session #1)
- New Race Record Cristiano da Matta 2:07:09.003
- Average Speed 68.723 mph
