= 2002 Grand Prix at Road America =

(United States) 2002 Road America
Race details
- Race 12 of 19 in the 2002 CART season
- Road America track layout
- Date: August 18, 2002
- Official name: 2002 Grand Prix at Road America Featuring the Motorola 220
- Location: Road America, Elkhart Lake, Wisconsin, United States
- Course: Permanent road course 4.048 mi / 6.515 km
- Distance: 60 laps 242.880 mi / 390.900 km
- Weather: Rain with temperatures reaching up to 77 °F (25 °C); wind speeds approaching 11.1 miles per hour (17.9 km/h)

Pole position
- Driver: (Brazil) Bruno Junqueira (Target Chip Ganassi Racing)
- Time: 1:42.151

Fastest lap
- Driver: (Brazil) Bruno Junqueira (Target Chip Ganassi Racing)
- Time: 1:43.792 (on lap 59 of 60)

Podium
- First: (Brazil) Cristiano da Matta (Newman/Haas Racing)
- Second: (Canada) Alex Tagliani (Team Player's)
- Third: (Brazil) Bruno Junqueira (Target Chip Ganassi Racing)

The 2002 Grand Prix at Road America was the twelfth round of the 2002 CART FedEx Champ Car World Series season, held on August 18, 2002, at Road America in Elkhart Lake, Wisconsin.

== Qualifying results ==
Pos	Nat	Name	Team	Qual 1	Qual 2	Best
1	(Brazil)	Bruno Junqueira	Target Chip Ganassi Racing	1:42.744	1:42.151	1:42.151
2	(Brazil)	Cristiano da Matta	Newman/Haas Racing	1:42.640	1:43.024	1:42.640
3	(Canada)	Alex Tagliani	Team Player's	1:43.184	1:42.684	1:42.684
4	(Canada)	Paul Tracy	Team KOOL Green	1:43.287	1:42.927	1:42.927
5	(New Zealand)	Scott Dixon	Target Chip Ganassi Racing	1:43.083	1:42.983	1:42.983
6	(United Kingdom)	Dario Franchitti	Team KOOL Green	1:42.990	1:43.651	1:42.990
7	(Sweden)	Kenny Brack	Target Chip Ganassi Racing	1:44.103	1:43.001	1:43.001
8	(Mexico)	Adrian Fernández	Fernández Racing	1:43.053	1:43.462	1:43.053
9	(Spain)	Oriol Servià	Patrick Racing	1:43.394	1:43.118	1:43.118
10	(Japan)	Shinji Nakano	Fernández Racing	1:43.884	1:43.195	1:43.195
11	(Brazil)	Christian Fittipaldi	Newman/Haas Racing	1:43.261	1:43.243	1:43.243
12	(Canada)	Patrick Carpentier	Team Player's	1:44.404	1:43.296	1:43.296
13	(Japan)	Tora Takagi	Walker Racing	1:43.992	1:43.394	1:43.394
14	(United States)	Michael Andretti	Team Motorola	1:43.431	1:43.395	1:43.395
15	(United States)	Jimmy Vasser	Team Rahal	1:44.253	1:43.980	1:43.980
16	(Mexico)	Michel Jourdain Jr.	Team Rahal	1:44.542	1:44.261	1:44.261
17	(Mexico)	Mario Domínguez	Herdez Competition	1:45.196	1:47.507	1:45.196
18	(Brazil)	Tony Kanaan	Mo Nunn Racing	4:56.153	-	4:56.153

== Race ==
Pos	No	Driver	Team	Laps	Time/Retired	Grid	Points
1	6	(Brazil) Cristiano da Matta	Newman/Haas Racing	60	1:56:43.030	2	21
2	33	(Canada) Alex Tagliani	Team Player's	60	+0.805	3	16
3	4	(Brazil) Bruno Junqueira	Target Chip Ganassi Racing	60	+1.530	1	15
4	10	(Brazil) Tony Kanaan	Mo Nunn Racing	60	+7.147	18	12
5	8	(United States) Jimmy Vasser	Team Rahal	60	+11.489	15	10
6	11	(Brazil) Christian Fittipaldi	Newman/Haas Racing	60	+12.391	11	8
7	32	(Canada) Patrick Carpentier	Team Player's	60	+13.112	12	6
8	55	(Mexico) Mario Domínguez	Herdez Competition	60	+23.548	17	5
9	9	(Mexico) Michel Jourdain Jr.	Team Rahal	60	+24.138	16	4
10	39	(United States) Michael Andretti	Team Motorola	58	+ 2 Laps	14	3
11	52	(Japan) Shinji Nakano	Fernández Racing	58	+ 2 Laps	10	2
12	27	(United Kingdom) Dario Franchitti	Team KOOL Green	43	Engine	6	1
13	26	(Canada) Paul Tracy	Team KOOL Green	39	Contact	4	1
14	12	(Sweden) Kenny Brack	Target Chip Ganassi Racing	39	Contact	7	0
15	5	(Japan) Tora Takagi	Walker Racing	36	Contact	13	0
16	20	(Spain) Oriol Servià	Patrick Racing	35	Out of fuel	9	0
17	44	(New Zealand) Scott Dixon	Target Chip Ganassi Racing	26	Fire	5	0
18	51	(Mexico) Adrian Fernández	Fernández Racing	26	Engine	8	0

== Caution flags ==
Laps	Cause
1	Andretti (39) off course
40-42	Tracy (26) & Bräck (12) contact
50-51	Nakano (52) off course

== Notes ==
Laps	Leader
1-24	Paul Tracy
25-38	Bruno Junqueira
39-60	Cristiano da Matta

Driver	Laps led
Paul Tracy	24
Cristiano da Matta	22
Bruno Junqueira	14

- New Race Record Cristiano da Matta 1:56:43.030
- Average Speed 124.856 mph

Previous race: 2002 CART Grand Prix of Mid-Ohio	CART FedEx Championship Series; 2002 season	Next race: 2002 Molson Indy Montreal
Previous race: 2001 Motorola 220	2002 Grand Prix at Road America	Next race: 2003 Mario Andretti Grand Prix at Road America
