= 2002 Molson Indy Montreal =

(Canada) 2002 Montreal
Race details
- Race 13 of 19 in the 2002 CART season
- Circuit Gilles Villeneuve track layout
- Date: August 25, 2002
- Official name: 2002 Molson Indy Montreal
- Location: Circuit Gilles Villeneuve; Montreal, Quebec, Canada
- Course: Permanent road course 2.709 mi / 4.360 km
- Distance: 80 laps 216.72 mi / 348.800 km
- Weather: Partly cloudy with temperatures reaching up to 25 °C (77 °F); maximum wind speeds of 5.1 kilometres per hour (3.2 mph) reported throughout the day

Pole position
- Driver: (Brazil) Cristiano da Matta (Newman/Haas Racing)
- Time: 1:18.959

Fastest lap
- Driver: (United Kingdom) Dario Franchitti (Team KOOL Green)
- Time: 1:20.238 (on lap 39 of 80)

Podium
- First: (United Kingdom) Dario Franchitti (Team KOOL Green)
- Second: (Brazil) Cristiano da Matta (Newman/Haas Racing)
- Third: (Brazil) Tony Kanaan (Mo Nunn Racing)

The 2002 Molson Indy Montreal was the thirteenth round of the 2002 CART FedEx Champ Car World Series season, held on August 25, 2002 at Circuit Gilles Villeneuve in Montreal, Quebec, Canada. It was the first Champ Car event to take place on the circuit best known for hosting the Formula One Canadian Grand Prix.

== Qualifying results ==
Pos	Nat	Name	Team	Qual 1	Qual 2	Best
1	(Brazil)	Cristiano da Matta	Newman/Haas Racing	1:19.465	1:18.959	1:18.959
2	(United Kingdom)	Dario Franchitti	Team KOOL Green	1:20.820	1:19.334	1:19.334
3	(Brazil)	Bruno Junqueira	Target Chip Ganassi Racing	1:20.199	1:19.347	1:19.347
4	(Canada)	Patrick Carpentier	Team Player's	1:20.504	1:19.510	1:19.510
5	(Sweden)	Kenny Bräck	Target Chip Ganassi Racing	1:19.873	1:19.625	1:19.625
6	(United States)	Jimmy Vasser	Team Rahal	1:20.532	1:19.704	1:19.704
7	(New Zealand)	Scott Dixon	Target Chip Ganassi Racing	1:19.755	1:20.216	1:19.755
8	(Canada)	Alex Tagliani	Team Player's	1:21.370	1:19.841	1:19.841
9	(Japan)	Shinji Nakano	Fernández Racing	1:20.172	1:19.870	1:19.870
10	(Canada)	Paul Tracy	Team KOOL Green	1:20.982	1:19.871	1:19.871
11	(Brazil)	Christian Fittipaldi	Newman/Haas Racing	1:20.125	1:19.893	1:19.893
12	(Japan)	Tora Takagi	Walker Racing	1:19.981	1:20.173	1:19.981
13	(Brazil)	Tony Kanaan	Mo Nunn Racing	1:20.788	1:20.010	1:20.010
14	(Spain)	Oriol Servià	Patrick Racing	1:20.161	1:20.831	1:20.161
15	(Mexico)	Michel Jourdain Jr.	Team Rahal	1:20.660	1:20.162	1:20.162
16	(Mexico)	Adrian Fernández	Fernández Racing	1:20.855	1:20.756	1:20.756
17	(Mexico)	Mario Domínguez	Herdez Competition	1:21.065	1:21.067	1:21.065
18	(United States)	Michael Andretti	Team Motorola	1:20.732	1:21.670	1:21.670

== Race ==
Pos	No	Driver	Team	Laps	Time/Retired	Grid	Points
1	27	(United Kingdom) Dario Franchitti	Team KOOL Green	80	1:59:40.938	2	21
2	6	(Brazil) Cristiano da Matta	Newman/Haas Racing	80	+2.588	1	18
3	10	(Brazil) Tony Kanaan	Mo Nunn Racing	80	+4.612	13	14
4	26	(Canada) Paul Tracy	Team KOOL Green	80	+6.266	10	12
5	8	(United States) Jimmy Vasser	Team Rahal	80	+6.808	6	10
6	9	(Mexico) Michel Jourdain Jr.	Team Rahal	80	+8.104	15	8
7	11	(Brazil) Christian Fittipaldi	Newman/Haas Racing	80	+13.021	11	6
8	39	(United States) Michael Andretti	Team Motorola	80	+13.503	18	5
9	52	(Japan) Shinji Nakano	Fernández Racing	79	+ 1 Lap	9	4
10	44	(New Zealand) Scott Dixon	Target Chip Ganassi Racing	77	Gearbox	7	3
11	33	(Canada) Alex Tagliani	Team Player's	77	+ 3 Laps	8	2
12	51	(Mexico) Adrian Fernández	Fernández Racing	69	Contact	16	1
13	4	(Brazil) Bruno Junqueira	Target Chip Ganassi Racing	68	Gearbox	3	0
14	5	(Japan) Tora Takagi	Walker Racing	64	Brakes	12	0
15	32	(Canada) Patrick Carpentier	Team Player's	27	Gearbox	4	0
16	20	(Spain) Oriol Servià	Patrick Racing	13	Drive shaft	14	0
17	55	(Mexico) Mario Domínguez	Herdez Competition	11	Engine	17	0
18	12	(Sweden) Kenny Bräck	Target Chip Ganassi Racing	0	Contact	5	0

== Caution flags ==
Laps	Cause
1-2	Bräck (12) contact
12-13	Domínguez (55) stopped on course
70-73	Fernández (51) contact

== Notes ==
Laps	Leader
1-11	Cristiano da Matta
12-20	Dario Franchitti
21	Adrian Fernández
22	Michel Jourdain Jr.
23-32	Cristiano da Matta
33-41	Dario Franchitti
42-50	Cristiano da Matta
51-62	Dario Franchitti
63-67	Cristiano da Matta
68-80	Dario Franchitti

Driver	Laps led
Dario Franchitti	43
Cristiano da Matta	35
Michel Jourdain Jr.	1
Adrian Fernández	1

- New Track Record Cristiano da Matta 1:18.959 (Qualification Session #2)
- New Race Lap Record Dario Franchitti 1:20.238
- New Race Record Dario Franchitti 1:59:40.938
- Average Speed 108.648 mph

Previous race: 2002 Grand Prix at Road America	CART FedEx Championship Series; 2002 season	Next race: 2002 Shell Grand Prix of Denver
Previous race: 1986 Molson Indy Montreal at Sanair Super Speedway	2002 Molson Indy Montreal	Next race: 2003 Molson Indy Montreal
