= 2002 Shell Grand Prix of Denver =

(United States) 2002 Denver
Race details
- Race 14 of 19 in the 2002 CART season
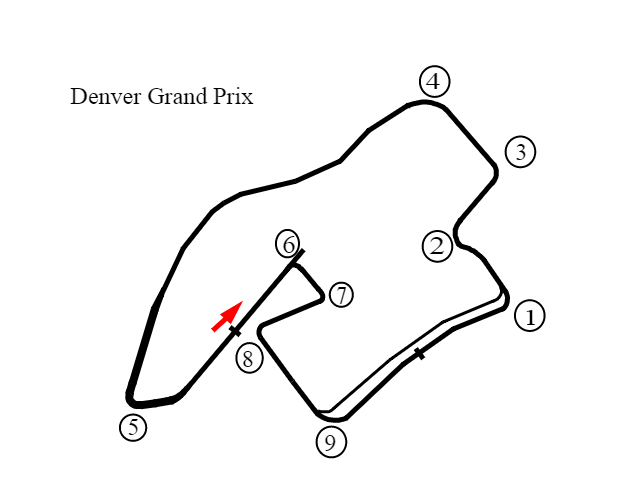
- Date: September 1, 2002
- Official name: 2002 Shell Grand Prix of Denver
- Location: Streets of Denver; Denver, Colorado, United States
- Course: Temporary street course 1.647 mi / 2.651 km
- Distance: 100 laps 164.700 mi / 265.100 km
- Weather: Mostly cloudy with temperatures reaching up to 87.1 °F (30.6 °C); wind speeds approaching 9.9 miles per hour (15.9 km/h)

Pole position
- Driver: (Brazil) Bruno Junqueira (Target Chip Ganassi Racing)
- Time: 1:01.703

Fastest lap
- Driver: (Sweden) Kenny Bräck (Target Chip Ganassi Racing)
- Time: 1:01.648 (on lap 85 of 100)

Podium
- First: (Brazil) Bruno Junqueira (Target Chip Ganassi Racing)
- Second: (New Zealand) Scott Dixon (Coors Light/Target Chip Ganassi Racing)
- Third: (Brazil) Cristiano da Matta (Newman/Haas Racing)

The 2002 Shell Grand Prix of Denver was the fourteenth round of the 2002 CART FedEx Champ Car World Series season, held on September 1, 2002 on the streets of Denver, Colorado around Pepsi Center. It was the first Champ Car event in Denver since a 1991 street course event in Denver's Civic Center.

== Qualifying results ==
Pos	Nat	Name	Team	Qual 1	Qual 2	Best
1	(Brazil)	Bruno Junqueira	Target Chip Ganassi Racing	1:02.950	1:01.703	1:01.703
2	(Mexico)	Adrian Fernández	Fernández Racing	1:02.073	1:02.311	1:02.073
3	(Japan)	Shinji Nakano	Fernández Racing	1:03.659	1:01.808	1:01.808
4	(New Zealand)	Scott Dixon	Coors Light/Target Chip Ganassi Racing	1:02.468	1:01.888	1:01.888
5	(Brazil)	Christian Fittipaldi	Newman/Haas Racing	1:02.440	1:01.992	1:01.992
6	(Sweden)	Kenny Bräck	Target Chip Ganassi Racing	1:03.254	1:02.049	1:02.049
7	(Brazil)	Cristiano da Matta	Newman/Haas Racing	1:02.810	1:02.149	1:02.149
8	(Canada)	Patrick Carpentier	Team Player's	1:04.760	1:02.181	1:02.181
9	(Brazil)	Tony Kanaan	Mo Nunn Racing	1:02.454	1:02.184	1:02.184
10	(Mexico)	Michel Jourdain Jr.	Team Rahal	1:03.940	1:02.244	1:02.244
11	(United States)	Jimmy Vasser	Team Rahal	1:03.204	1:02.305	1:02.305
12	(Canada)	Alex Tagliani	Team Player's	1:04.516	1:02.471	1:02.471
13	(Spain)	Oriol Servià	Patrick Racing	1:03.156	1:02.476	1:02.476
14	(United Kingdom)	Dario Franchitti	Team KOOL Green	1:03.619	1:02.601	1:02.601
15	(Canada)	Paul Tracy	Team KOOL Green	1:03.632	1:02.726	1:02.726
16	(Mexico)	Mario Domínguez	Herdez Competition	1:04.558	1:02.762	1:02.762
17	(United States)	Michael Andretti	Team Motorola	1:03.432	1:02.817	1:02.817
18	(Japan)	Tora Takagi	Walker Racing	1:03.538	1:03.200	1:03.200

== Race ==
Pos	No	Driver	Team	Laps	Time/Retired	Grid	Points
1	4	(Brazil) Bruno Junqueira	Target Chip Ganassi Racing	100	1:49:22.547	1	22
2	44	(New Zealand) Scott Dixon	Coors Light/Target Chip Ganassi Racing	100	+0.282	4	16
3	6	(Brazil) Cristiano da Matta	Newman/Haas Racing	100	+8.191	7	14
4	51	(Mexico) Adrian Fernández	Fernández Racing	100	+11.911	2	13
5	11	(Brazil) Christian Fittipaldi	Newman/Haas Racing	100	+12.562	5	10
6	10	(Brazil) Tony Kanaan	Mo Nunn Racing	100	+13.288	9	8
7	12	(Sweden) Kenny Bräck	Target Chip Ganassi Racing	100	+13.705	6	6
8	26	(Canada) Paul Tracy	Team KOOL Green	100	+14.496	15	5
9	9	(Mexico) Michel Jourdain Jr.	Team Rahal	100	+15.497	10	4
10	8	(United States) Jimmy Vasser	Team Rahal	100	+16.586	11	3
11	20	(Spain) Oriol Servià	Patrick Racing	100	+26.507	13	2
12	33	(Canada) Alex Tagliani	Team Player's	99	+ 1 Lap	12	1
13	39	(United States) Michael Andretti	Team Motorola	99	+ 1 Lap	17	0
14	55	(Mexico) Mario Domínguez	Herdez Competition	97	+ 3 Laps	16	0
15	5	(Japan) Tora Takagi	Walker Racing	85	Contact	18	0
16	52	(Japan) Shinji Nakano	Fernández Racing	64	Gearbox	3	0
17	32	(Canada) Patrick Carpentier	Team Player's	61	Contact	8	0
18	27	(United Kingdom) Dario Franchitti	Team KOOL Green	0	Contact	14	0

== Caution flags ==
Laps	Cause
88-92	Takagi (5) & Domínguez (55) contact

== Notes ==
Laps / Leader; 1-100 / Bruno Junqueira	Driver / Laps led; Bruno Junqueira / 100

- New Race Lap Record Kenny Bräck 1:01.648
- New Race Record Bruno Junqueira 1:49:22.547
- Average Speed 90.349 mph

Previous race: 2002 Molson Indy Montreal	CART FedEx Championship Series; 2002 season	Next race: 2002 Sure for Men Rockingham 500
Previous race: 1991 Texaco/Havoline Grand Prix of Denver at Civic Center	2002 Shell Grand Prix of Denver	Next race: 2003 Centrix Financial Grand Prix of Denver
