= 2001 Rockingham 500 =

Coordinates: 52.5150°N 0.6575°W

(United Kingdom) 2001 Rockingham 500
Race details
- Race 17 of 21 in the 2001 CART season
- Map of the track
- Date: 22 September, 2001
- Official name: Rockingham 500K
- Location: Rockingham Motor Speedway, Corby, Northamptonshire, England
- Course: Permanent racing facility 1.479 mi / 2.380 km
- Distance: 140 laps 207.060 mi / 333.230 km
- Weather: Partly Cloudy

Pole position
- Driver: (Sweden) Kenny Bräck (Team Rahal)
- Time: No Time Trials

Fastest lap
- Driver: (Canada) Patrick Carpentier (Forsythe Racing)
- Time: 25.251 (on lap 134 of 140)

Podium
- First: (Brazil) Gil de Ferran (Team Penske)
- Second: (Sweden) Kenny Bräck (Team Rahal)
- Third: (Brazil) Cristiano da Matta (Newman/Haas Racing)

The 2001 Rockingham 500 was a Championship Auto Racing Teams (CART) open-wheel race held on 22 September 2001 at the Rockingham Motor Speedway in Corby, Northamptonshire, England before 38,000 people. It was the 17th race of the 2001 CART FedEx Championship Series, the second (and final) event of the year to be held in Europe, and the series' first visit to the United Kingdom. Team Penske driver Gil de Ferran won the 140-lap race starting from second position. Kenny Bräck finished second for Team Rahal, and Newman/Haas Racing driver Cristiano da Matta was third.

Bräck led the Drivers' Championship entering the event. Drainage problems with the circuit caused the first two days of the event to be cancelled. Bräck — the season points leader heading into the race — was awarded the pole position. Due to a compacted schedule the original distance of the race was reduced from 210 laps to 168. Bräck lost the lead on the first lap to de Ferran, who held it for the next 44 laps. Bräck passed de Ferran to reclaim the lead on the 45th lap and remained the leader until the second round of pit stops. The race distance was further reduced by series race director Chris Kneifel from 168 to 140 laps because of fading daylight. De Ferran held the first position until a slower car delayed him and allowed Bräck to retake the lead on the race's penultimate lap. He held it until de Ferran made a race-winning overtake on the final lap. It was de Ferran's first victory of the season, his second on an oval track, and the sixth of his career. There were three cautions and five lead changes during the race.

The result lowered Bräck's advantage over de Ferran in the Drivers' Championship to six points. Michael Andretti remained in third position though the revised gap to Hélio Castroneves in the battle for the position was two points. Da Matta's third-placed finish moved him from eighth to fifth. Honda's increased its lead over Ford Cosworth in the Manufacturers' Championship, while Toyota maintained third place, with four races left in the season.

== Background ==
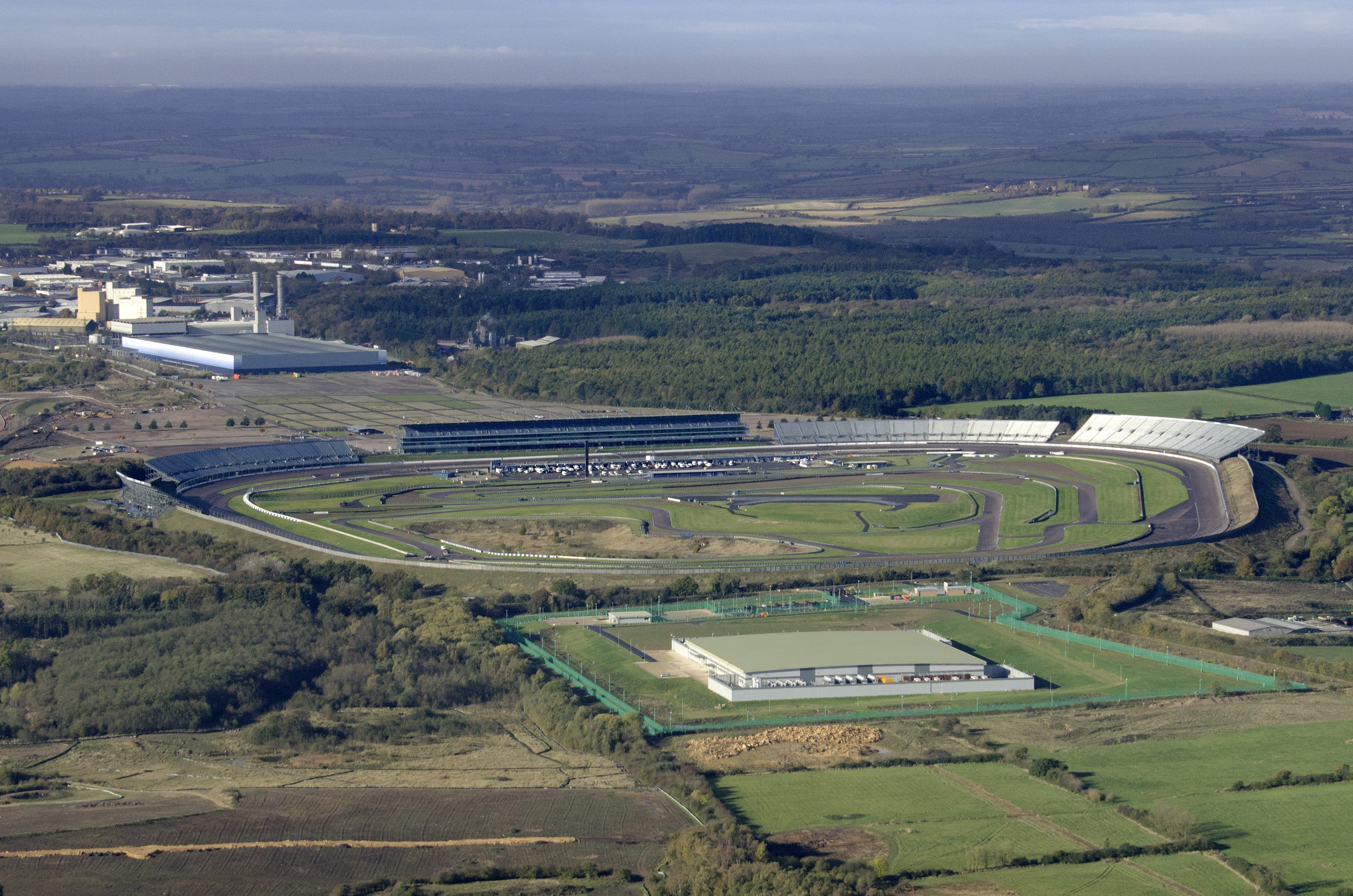
Rockingham Motor Speedway, where the race was held.

The Rockingham 500 was confirmed as part of CART's 2001 series' schedule in July 2000. It was the conclusion of a two-week European stretch for the series; the American Memorial was held at EuroSpeedway Lausitz in Klettwitz, Germany one week earlier. The Rockingham 500 was the 17th of 21 scheduled races for 2001 by CART, the first edition of the event, and was held on 22 September at the Rockingham Motor Speedway in Corby, Northamptonshire, England. It was the first time that CART had visited the United Kingdom. CART hoped for a crowd of 40,000 at the track, which had a capacity of 52,000. The track is a four-turn 1.479-mile (2.380 km) rectangular oval that has banking of up to 7.9 degrees. Prior to the race, Team Rahal driver Kenny Bräck led the Drivers' Championship on 131 points, ahead of Gil de Ferran in second and Michael Andretti third. Hélio Castroneves was close behind in fourth with 111 points, ahead of fifth-placed Scott Dixon with 86 points. Honda led the Constructors' Championship with 257 points; Ford Cosworth were in second on 224 points, two ahead of Toyota in third place.

Bräck said his car's engine and chassis had been fast on oval tracks and felt that he and his team would compete for the victory at Rockingham. Da Matta mentioned he had good results in the lower category formulas at English racing circuits, and he had good memories about competing in the country, and hoped the race at Rockingham would be "interesting" having heard of a smooth track surface. Following a major accident involving Alex Zanardi at the season's previous race in which Zanardi lost both of his legs when he was struck by another driver, his team Mo Nunn Racing announced they would participate at Rockingham but entered only one car. All crew members who worked on Zanardi's car were sent to the United States to recover from the incident, although his wife protested the decision. Mo Nunn Racing announced that the car would return for the next race of the year (at the Grand Prix of Houston), and revealed the week after Rockingham that Indy Lights Series driver Casey Mears would participate in the season's four remaining races.

== Practice and qualifying ==
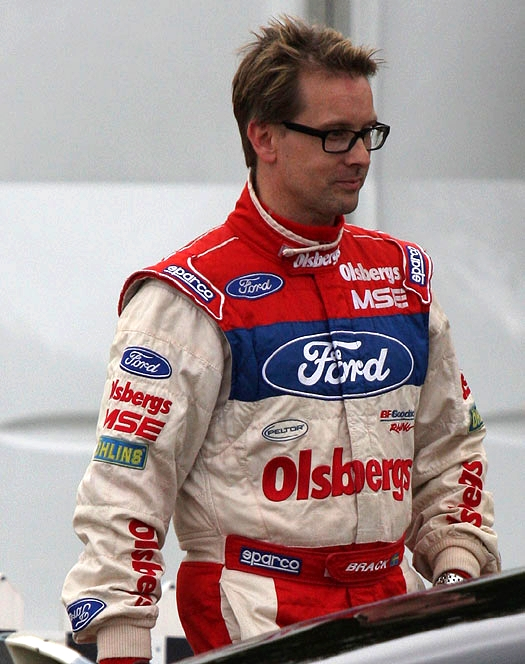
Kenny Bräck (pictured in 2011) was awarded pole position as the leader of the Drivers' Championship standings.

A total of three practice sessions were scheduled to be held before the Sunday race: two on Thursday and one on Friday. The first session was due to last 105 minutes, and the second and third sessions 90 minutes. Heavy rain three days beforehand meant the local clay absorbed a large amount of water. Only a small amount of evaporation had occurred due to low ambient temperatures. Race officials examined water that emerged through the track's surface in several areas on Thursday. The track surface had been drilled through overnight in an effort to drain collected water and prevent further seepage. Later, CART's jet dryer was used on the track. Although a dry surface was created, water continued to appear through it. CART chief steward Chris Kneifel drove the pace car onto the track at 3:00 p.m. British Summer Time (UTC+1) along with 26 cars and 23 secondary vehicles under caution for five installation laps in separate groups. No improvement was reported, and CART cancelled remainder of the day's activities an hour later.

Course officials resumed work by drilling shafts into the surface to form a well in an attempt to reduce the drainage problem before the start of Friday's scheduled sessions. It was mooted by some British press publications that the race would be moved to the track's infield road course. This was unfeasible since the circuit did not hold a licence from motorsport's world governing body, the Fédération Internationale de l'Automobile, to race on it, and the teams had not brought a suitable aerodynamic package. Drainage problems continued to affect the track and the qualifying session was cancelled. The starting order was determined by the drivers order in the points' standings. The pole position was awarded to Bräck, his sixth of the season. He was joined on the grid's front row by de Ferran. Andretti, Castroneves, Dixon, Dario Franchitti, Patrick Carpentier, Cristiano da Matta, Roberto Moreno and Tony Kanaan completed the top ten. Drying efforts continued overnight with additional equipment and extra workers from across England brought in to improve the track's drainage. Five jet dryers were taken onto the circuit with additional fuel transported from Sywell Aerodrome to help them carry out their operation. Additionally, thousands of small holes were created in the track's surface to release moisture.

Rockingham Motor Speedway's chief executive David Grace apologised for the delays and denied the anticipation of a drainage problem. He added that the operators were advised by experts. CART's chairman and CEO Joseph Heitzler rejected suggestions that it was the incorrect decision to hold the race in September as he had been informed that the month was one of the driest of the year. Carpentier argued that circuit personnel should have been prepared a month beforehand, while Kanaan voiced his concerns about the situation for everybody. The 15,000 spectators who were in attendance on Thursday were issued cash refunds.

== Race ==
Problems on the back straight had been mostly rectified although a damp track surface in the first and fourth turns was created by water coming from under the grandstands. Race officials deliberated on the morning of the race and declared the track safe after repairs were completed. The drivers took to the track at 11:15 a.m local time for a ten-minute practice session. Carpentier set the fastest time of 27.075 seconds; Franchitti and Jimmy Vasser were second and third. A second 90-minute session began at 12:20 p.m. local time. Kanaan recorded the session's quickest lap at 24.719 seconds, ahead of Bräck and Tracy in second and third. Three yellow caution flags were shown: the first was for Max Papis who cut his right-rear tyre, the second was for Maurício Gugelmin who slid out of the groove and hit the turn one outside barrier. His car slid across the wall and stopped at the corner's exit. The final stoppage was for a track inspection after Castroneves' pit crew reported a cut right rear tyre.

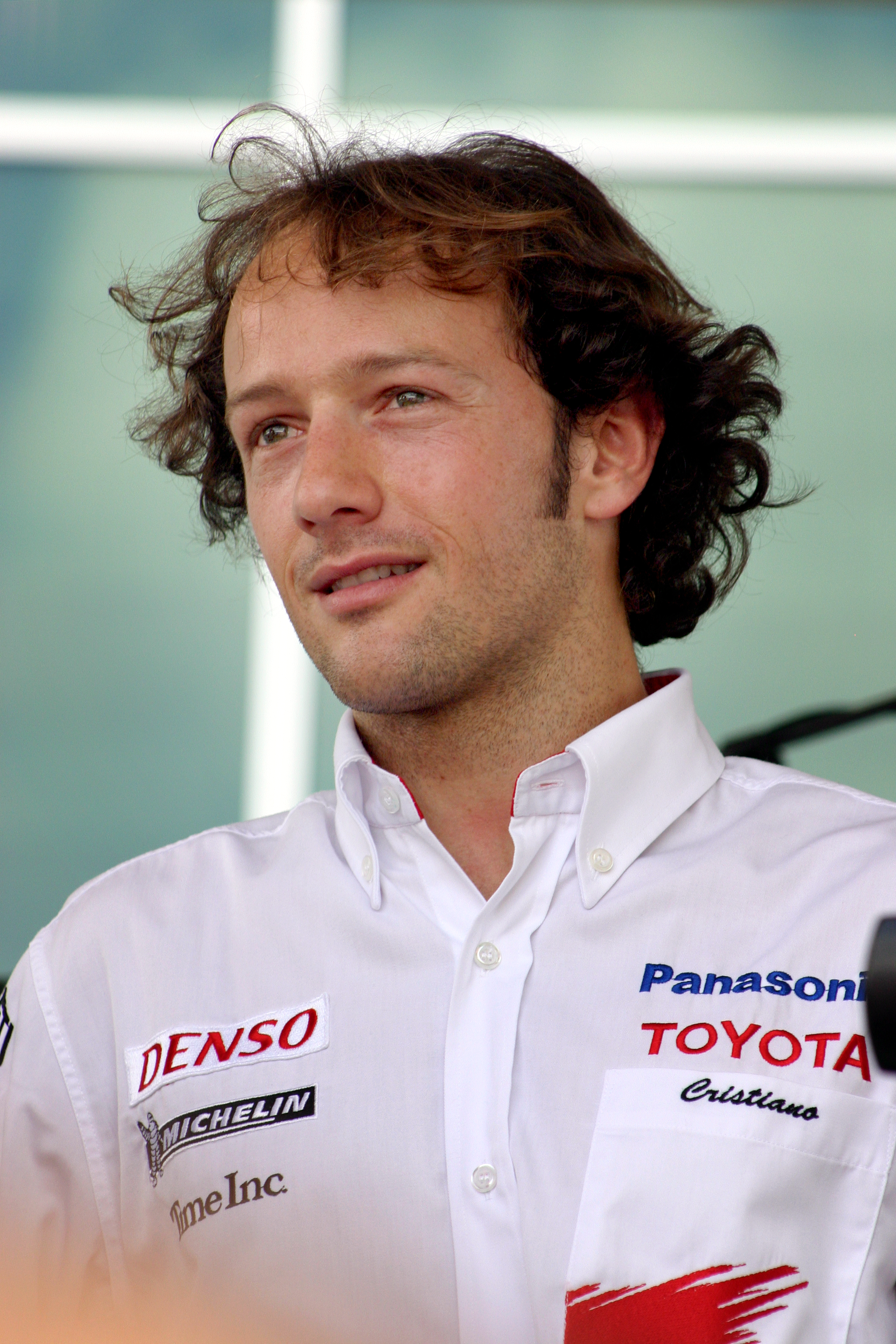
Cristiano da Matta (pictured in 2004) finished in third place.

All drivers participated in an eight-minute installation session which saw Kanaan continue his good form by setting the fastest lap, ahead of Tracy and Dixon. Weather conditions to start the race were partly cloudy and mild with an air temperature ranging from 11 to 19 °C (52 to 66 °F), and a track temperature between 16 and 20 °C (61 and 68 °F). The race was due to be held over 210 laps originally but the compacted schedule reduced it to 168. Oriol Servià's car failed to start and his pit crew worked quickly to allow him to take the start. Michel Jourdain Jr. had problems starting his engine but was able to join the field. The race started before approximately 38,000 spectators at 4:45 p.m. local time. Bräck maintained his pole position advantage heading into the first turn with de Ferran driving to the outside. De Ferran passed Bräck on the back straight to take over first place and held it to lead the first lap.

The race's first caution was necessitated on the same lap when Papis spun on the frontstretch, and slid backwards towards the first corner before getting his car facing in the racing direction. Vasser made contact with Tora Takagi who was sent into the frontstretch barrier. Bruno Junqueira and Memo Gidley spun in avoidance; the latter regained control of his car while Junqueira struck the outside wall, causing him to become the race's first retirement. Max Wilson spun while gaining optimum tyre temperature and fell to the rear of the field. The race restarted on the ninth lap with de Ferran leading Bräck and Andretti. Wilson delayed Bräck on the 23rd lap allowing de Ferran to establish a two-second lead over him. Wilson received a warning from the series' race control. Franchitti passed Castroneves for fourth seven laps later. Christian Fittipaldi attempted to lap Gidley on lap 37, but the latter drove defensively, causing Fittipaldi to slow, and Vasser, Adrián Fernández, and Carpentier overtook him.

Bräck closed the gap with de Ferran over the next 15 laps as they moved towards slower cars. Bräck got a run on de Ferran and overtook him at the bottom of the first turn to take the lead on lap 46, while Andretti lost fourth place to Franchitti on the same lap. Jourdain's car generated oversteer and he spun leaving turn four, and slid down the frontstretch triggering the second caution on the 50th lap. Franchitti drove right in avoidance. Castroneves avoided hitting Jourdain's car, which remained at the bottom of the first turn and, though his vehicle lost a shock cover, he regained control of his car and continued. Fittipaldi reported to his team that he had a problem with either his gearbox or drivetrain and drove slowly into the pit lane on lap 53 becoming the race's second retirement. The leaders elected to make pit stops on the same lap under caution. Da Matta gained the most positions, moving from sixth to third, and Bräck remained the leader at the lap-57 restart. Bräck pulled away from the rest of the field, until de Ferran drew closer to him by the start of the 80th lap.

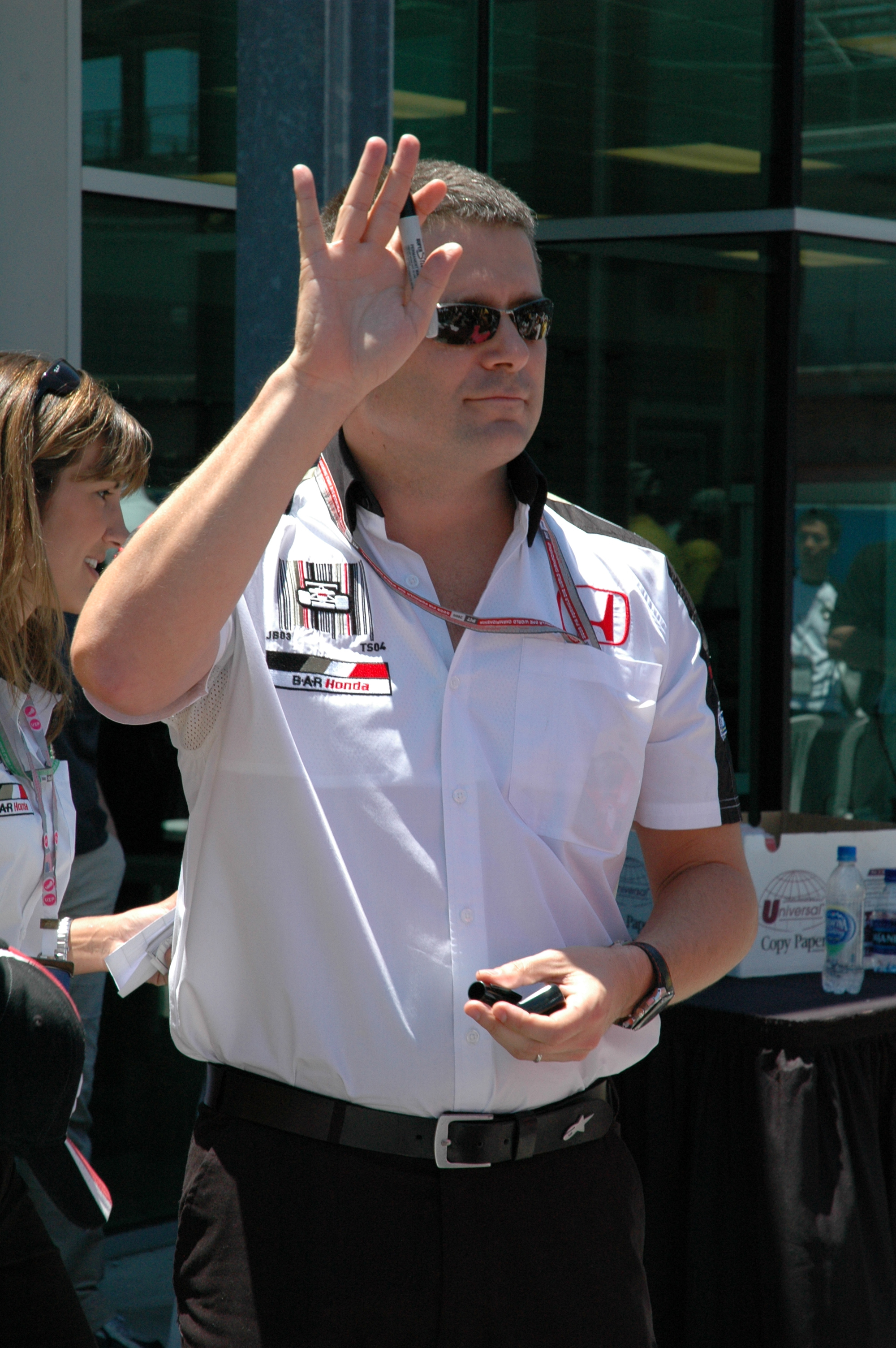
Gil de Ferran (pictured in 2005) clinched his first victory of the season, and the sixth of his career.

Da Matta, Andretti, and Franchitti contended for third position until the field closed up because of the presence of slower cars. The third caution was shown 14 laps later when Adrián Fernández lost engine power driving into the second turn; he steered to the bottom of the track on the backstretch to retire. Oil was laid on the track heading into turn two, and marshals were required to dry it. Kniefel announced on lap 90 that he had reduced the number of laps to be run from 168 to 140 because of fading sunlight. All of the leaders (including Bräck) chose to make pit stops for fuel and tyres under caution on lap 100. Castroneves passed da Matta and Andretti on the inside in the pit lane and Newman/Haas Racing believed he had committed an infraction. The team informed CART of Castroneves' passing, which was observed by their co-owner Paul Newman.

De Ferran gained the lead and maintained it at the lap-104 restart. Bräck attempted to pass de Ferran on the outside of the first turn for first place but was unable to get ahead. De Ferran pulled away from the rest of the field. Dixon drove into the pit lane and became the race's fifth (and final) retirement on the 106th lap. His pit crew claimed his car was damaged following contact with Servià during the caution period. Kanaan was closely following Andretti but was held up by the driver, which allowed Paul Tracy to pass him. The move caused Kannan's car to develop understeer and Vasser overtook him. Carpentier set the race's fastest lap during the 134th lap, completing a circuit in 25.521 seconds. On lap 138, Bräck drafted slower cars while Papis slowed de Ferran in turn four. Bräck passed de Ferran on the outside driving into the first turn to take the lead on the same lap. On the final lap, Bräck led de Ferran by two-tenths of a second. As the two drivers entered the back straight, De Ferran drafted up to the outside of Bräck and closed up to him in the second and third corners. De Ferran steered right and overtook Bräck for the lead in the fourth turn's entrance. Both drivers avoided making contact at the corner's edge; de Ferran defended and Bräck slowed to avoid a collision with him.

De Ferran remained the leader for the rest of the final lap to claim his first victory of the season, his second on an oval track, and the sixth of his career. He became the 11th driver to win a race in 2001, tying a record established in the 2000 season. Bräck finished second, ahead of Castroneves in third. Da Matta, Andretti, Tracy, Vasser, Kanaan, Franchitti, Servià, Papis, Townsend Bell, Moreno, Alex Tagliani, Bryan Herta, Carpentier, Shinji Nakano, Gidley, Jourdain, Gugelmin and Wilson were the final classified finishers. There were five lead changes in the race; two drivers reached the front of the field. De Ferran's led three times for a total of 84 laps, which was the highest of any competitor. The attrition rate was low, with 21 of the 26 starters finishing the race.

=== Post-race ===
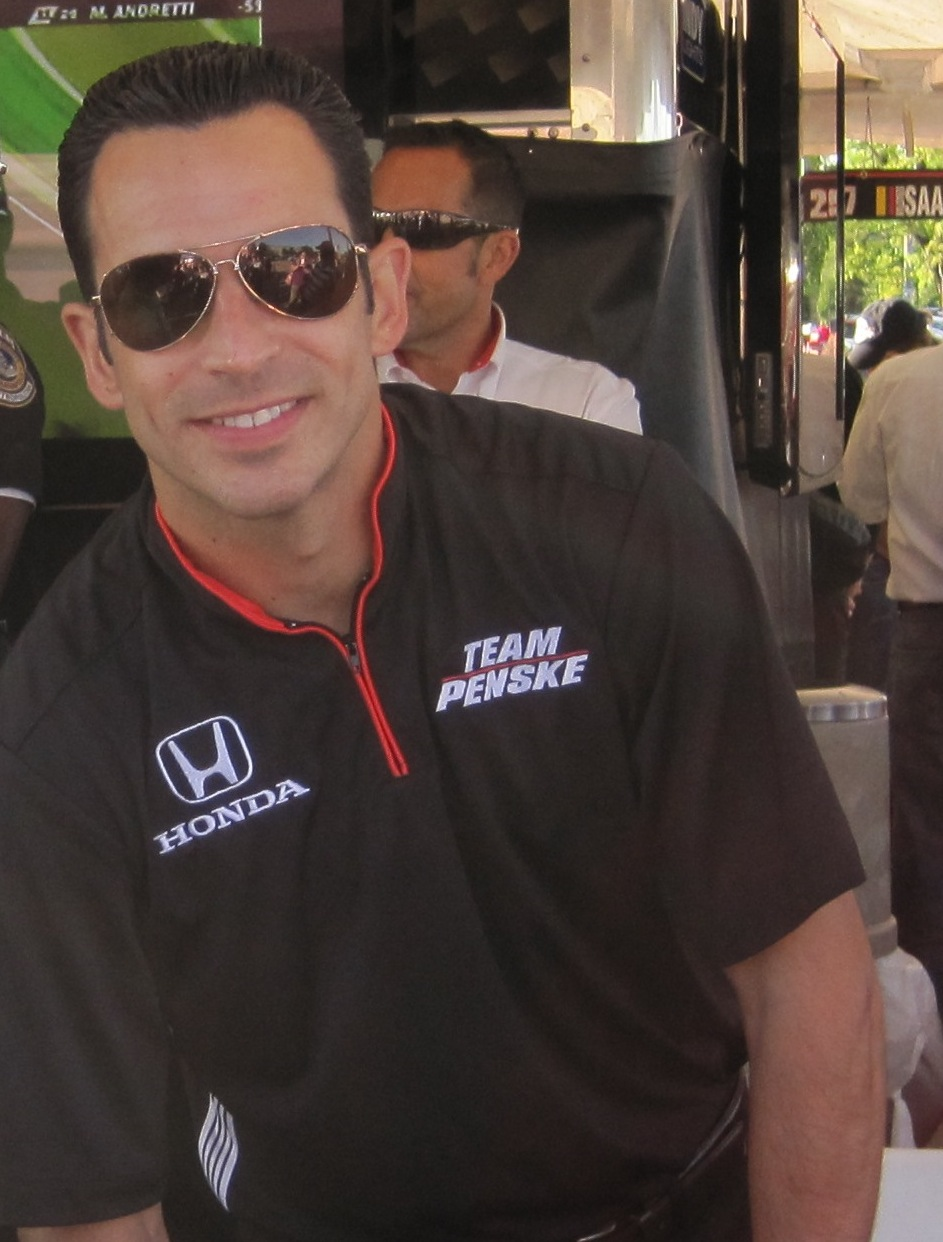
Hélio Castroneves (pictured in 2010) was demoted from third to fourth after he was judged to have passed two cars under caution.

The top three drivers appeared on the podium to collect their trophies and in a later press conference. De Ferran stated that: "I think first of all, I'd like to say that we're still running under a little bit of a cloud with all of the things that happened in the U.S. last week and what happened to (Alex) Zanardi is still in all of our minds." He said that he was "glad" to have taken part in the race and that the victory was special for him because his wife is from England. De Ferran earned US$100,000 (£68,600) for the victory. Bräck said that he had no complaint over the last-lap loss and that it was a "tough" and "exciting" race. He said the season's final four races were "crucial" and that the "very close" battle for the championship was not over. He stated that he was looking forward to those events and hoped they would play into his favour. Castroneves congratulated de Ferran on securing the victory, saying that it was "a quick and busy day" for the people who were involved in the event. He was glad that the race was able to be held, and hoped to achieve a good result at the season's following round in Houston.

The circuit received a mixed response from the drivers. De Ferran described it as "very, very fast" and felt the first and second turns was similar to the Indianapolis Motor Speedway. The fourth corner reminded him of Homestead–Miami Speedway and what the former Club corner at the Silverstone Circuit used to be like. Da Matta said the circuit was faster than the drivers anticipated though he felt car speeds exceeded those normally considered safe and that overtaking was difficult. Tracy stated the Rockingham Motor Speedway was a good track to drive on, and felt it would be "a great facility" to show CART in the United Kingdom. Drivers did not criticise the problems that affected the event. De Ferran stated that similar problems had occurred at several race tracks across the United States. He said that the advice he would give to CART was to avoid holding the race in September. Bräck stated he did not know of a similar event where it had taken longer than expected to dry the track. Heitzler said the series would return to Rockingham Motor Speedway in 2002, and pledged that any problems with circuit drainage would not reoccur.

Two hours after the race, Castroneves was deemed to have overtaken under caution and was demoted from third to fourth. Castroneves stated that he did not understand why the non-appealable penalty was issued after the race and that it appeared "very unfair". Da Matta believed Castroneves had not abided by the series' regulations and forgot a change in the pit lane speed limit. Nevertheless, he was happy to finish third, and revealed that his team held their own celebration after learning about the penalty. Although Servià finished tenth, race officials had recorded his result as 15th. His team manager Phil Howard met with CART officials to discuss the issue and Servià's final finishing position was corrected to tenth. Ninth-place finisher Franchitti said his car was good in the first half, although as the temperature dropped it became "nervous" entering and exiting the track's turns in the race's second stint, and stated he could have dealt with his result had he gained his desired finishing position.

Media reactions to the race were positive. Kevin Eason of The Times said, "What the inaugural Rockingham 500 CART FedEx race in Britain lacked in quantity, it made up for with driving of the highest quality." He reserved praise for de Ferran's last lap overtake on Bräck, calling it "astonishing". Writing for The Sunday Telegraph, Brough Scott stated, "Births have always come with their share of noise, difficulty, danger and the odd touch of absurdity. But never can all the elements have been mixed as heavily as in yesterday's much-delayed launch of the Rockingham 500, which opened and closed with overtaking manoeuvres dramatic enough to take your breath away." Richard Williams of The Guardian wrote, "the 38,000 people who had battled against uncertainty and Silverstone-style traffic jams to see US single-seater cars racing on a banked oval track for the first time in Britain were rewarded with a race that fully reflected the present strengths of a branch of motor sport that can trace its roots back to the first running of the Indianapolis 500 race in 1911." The Associated Press stated that despite the race almost being cancelled it became "one of CART's most dramatic of the season."

The result meant de Ferran reduced Bräck's Drivers' Championship lead to six points. Andretti remained in third, but his advantage over Castroneves was reduced to two points. Da Matta's third-place finish advanced him from eighth to fifth. Honda increased their advantage over Ford Cosworth in the Manufacturers' Championship to 38 points, while Toyota remained in third with four races left in the season. Highlights of the race were broadcast the day after on the BBC Two sports programme Sunday Grandstand with commentary from Leigh Diffey and former racing driver Mark Blundell. It was due to be broadcast live in the United States on ESPN but was moved to ESPN2. Despite being set for a tape delay broadcast at 12 a.m. Eastern Daylight Time, the race was eventually carried live as the start was postponed an hour further.

=== Race classification ===
Race results
Pos	No	Driver	Team	Laps	Time/retired	Grid	Points
1	1	Gil de Ferran (BRA)	Team Penske	140	1:20:59.050	2	21^{1}
2	8	Kenny Bräck (SWE)	Team Rahal	140	+0.634	1	16
3	6	Cristiano da Matta (BRA)	Newman/Haas Racing	140	+14.663	8	14
4	3	Hélio Castroneves (BRA)	Team Penske	140	+16.335	4	12^{2}
5	39	Michael Andretti (USA)	Team Motorola	140	+17.056	3	10
6	26	Paul Tracy (CAN)	Team Green	140	+18.919	11	8
7	40	Jimmy Vasser (USA)	Patrick Racing	140	+19.060	16	6
8	55	Tony Kanaan (BRA)	Mo Nunn Racing	140	+19.740	10	5
9	27	Dario Franchitti (GBR)	Team Green	140	+20.281	6	4
10	22	Oriol Servià (ESP)	Sigma Autosport	140	+26.431	18	3
11	7	Max Papis (ITA)	Team Rahal	140	+26.794	12	2
12	19	Townsend Bell (USA)	Patrick Racing	139	+1 Lap	26	1
13	20	Roberto Moreno (BRA)	Patrick Racing	139	+1 Lap	9	—
14	33	Alex Tagliani (CAN)	Forsythe Racing	139	+1 Lap	14	—
15	77	Bryan Herta (USA)	Forsythe Racing	139	+1 Lap	20	—
16	32	Patrick Carpentier (CAN)	Forsythe Racing	138	+2 Laps	7	—
17	52	Shinji Nakano (JPN)	Fernández Racing	138	+2 Laps	25	—
18	12	Memo Gidley (USA)	Chip Ganassi Racing	137	+3 Laps	19	—
19	16	Michel Jourdain Jr. (MEX)	Bettenhausen Racing	137	+3 Laps	21	—
20	17	Maurício Gugelmin (BRA)	PacWest Racing	135	+5 Laps	24	—
21	25	Max Wilson (BRA)	Arciero-Blair Racing	135	+5 Laps	23	—
22	18	Scott Dixon (NZL)	PacWest Racing	106	Contact	5	—
23	51	Adrián Fernández (MEX)	Fernández Racing	92	Mechanical	17	—
24	11	Christian Fittipaldi (BRA)	Newman/Haas Racing	52	Driveshaft	13	—
25	4	Bruno Junqueira (BRA)	Chip Ganassi Racing	1	Contact	15	—
26	5	Toranosuke Takagi (JPN)	Walker Racing	1	Contact	22	—

Notes

- ^1— Includes one bonus point for leading the most laps.
- ^2— Helio Castroneves was demoted from third to fourth for passing under yellow flag caution conditions.

== Standings after the race ==
Drivers' Championship standings
Rank	+/–	Driver	Points
1		Kenny Bräck (SWE)	147
2		Gil de Ferran (BRA)	141 (−6)
3		Michael Andretti (USA)	125 (−22)
4		Hélio Castroneves (BRA)	123 (−24)
5	3	Cristiano da Matta (BRA)	92 (−55)

Constructors' standings
Rank	+/–	Constructor	Points
1		Reynard (UK)	307
2		Lola (UK)	260 (−47)

Manufacturers' standings
Rank	+/–	Manufacturer	Points
1		Honda (Japan)	278
2		Ford Cosworth (UK)	240 (−38)
3		Toyota (Japan)	236 (−42)
Sources:

- Note: Only the top five positions are included for the drivers' standings.

Previous race: 2001 American Memorial	CART FedEx Championship Series; 2001 season	Next race: 2001 Grand Prix of Houston
Previous race: N/A	2001 Rockingham 500	Next race: 2002 Sure for Men Rockingham 500
