= 2002 Sure for Men Rockingham 500 =

(United Kingdom) 2002 Rockingham
Race details
- Race 15 of 19 in the 2002 CART season
- Rockingham Motor Speedway Oval Course
- Date: 14 September, 2002
- Official name: 2002 Sure for Men Rockingham 500
- Location: Rockingham Motor Speedway, Corby, Northamptonshire, England
- Course: Permanent racing facility 1.479 mi / 2.380 km
- Distance: 211 laps 312.069 mi / 502.18 km
- Weather: Cloudy, Cool

Pole position
- Driver: (Sweden) Kenny Bräck (Chip Ganassi Racing)
- Time: 24.908

Fastest lap
- Driver: (United States) Jimmy Vasser (Team Rahal)
- Time: 25.217 (on lap 210 of 211)

Podium
- First: (United Kingdom) Dario Franchitti (Team Green)
- Second: (Brazil) Cristiano da Matta (Newman/Haas Racing)
- Third: (Canada) Patrick Carpentier (Forysthe Racing)

The 2002 Sure for Men Rockingham 500 was a Championship Auto Racing Teams (CART) open-wheel race held on 14 September 2002 at the Rockingham Motor Speedway in Corby, Northamptonshire, England in front of an estimated crowd of 38,000 people. It was the 15th round of the 2002 CART FedEx Championship Series, the second Rockingham 500, and the only race of the year to be held in Europe due to the cancellation of the German 500 when the EuroSpeedway Lausitz filed for insolvency. Team Green driver Dario Franchitti won the 211-lap race starting from fifth position. Cristiano da Matta finished second for Newman/Haas Racing, and Forsythe Racing's Patrick Carpentier was third.

Da Matta led the Drivers' Championship going into the race. Kenny Bräck won the pole position by setting the fastest lap in the qualifying session and maintained his advantage heading into the first lap. He led for a total of 134 laps, more than any other driver. Franchitti employed a strategy that enabled him to drive in clean air while other drivers made pit stops. Bräck reclaimed the lead for the lap-163 restart, but lost it six laps later when a crew member dropped a wheel nut, which cost him time. Franchitti took the lead and held it for the remainder of the event to achieve his third victory of the season, his first on an oval track, and the tenth of his CART career. There were five cautions and nine lead changes during the course of the race.

The result put da Matta 58 points ahead of Bruno Junqueira in the Drivers' Championship. Franchitti maintained third place but was closer to Junqueira, with Carpentier and Christian Fittipaldi fourth and fifth. Toyota extended their advantage over Honda in the Manufacturers' Championship while Ford Cosworth remained in third, with four races left in the season. The race attracted 60 million worldwide television viewers. It was the final United Kingdom CART race to be held at Rockingham Motor Speedway as it moved to Brands Hatch, Kent in 2003.

== Background ==
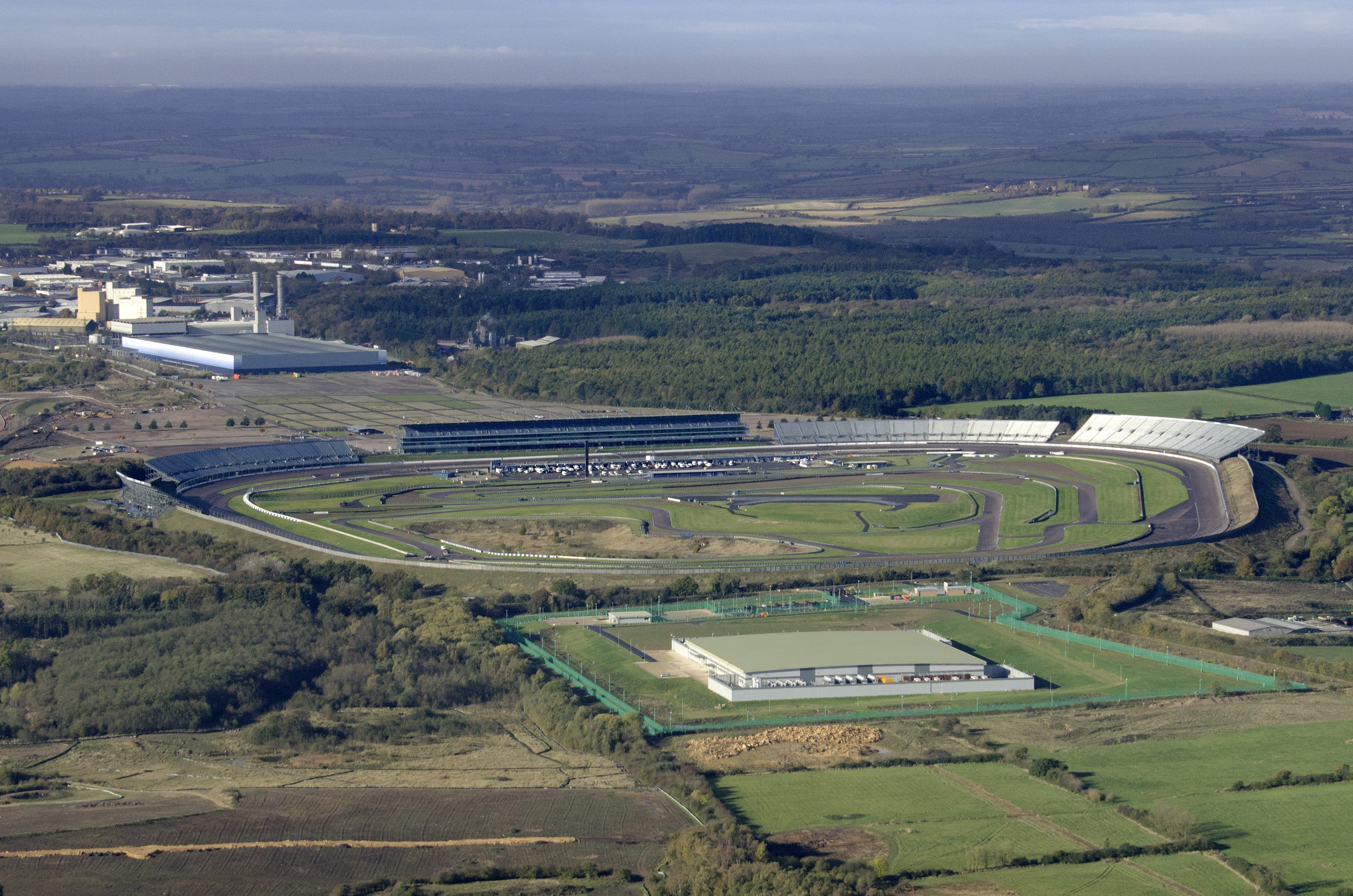
Rockingham Motor Speedway, where the race was held.

The Sure for Men Rockingham 500 was confirmed as part of CART's 2002 schedule in November 2001. It was the 15th of 19 scheduled races by CART, and was held on 14 September at the 1.479 mi (2.380 km) rectangular Rockingham Motor Speedway oval track in Corby, Northamptonshire, England over 211 laps and a distance of 312.069 mi (502.226 km). It was the second consecutive year the race was held at Rockingham, and the only event of 2002 to be held in Europe. It was expected there would be an attendance of 52,000, the track's maximum capacity. The track is a four-turn 1.479-mile (2.380 km) oval that has banking of up to 7.9 degrees. The ASCAR Racing Series held support races during the weekend. Before the race, Newman/Haas Racing driver Cristiano da Matta led the Drivers' Championship with 175 points, ahead of Bruno Junqueira in second, and Dario Franchitti in third. Patrick Carpentier was fourth on 101 points, and Christian Fittipaldi was a further three points behind in fifth. Toyota led the Manufacturers' Championship with 248 points, Honda were second on 214 points, and Ford Cosworth were in third on 178. Gil de Ferran was the race's defending champion from the 2001 event.

Following the cancellation of the German 500 at EuroSpeedway Lausitz due to financial difficulties, it was announced that the race at Rockingham was going ahead as scheduled. David Grace, the track's chief executive, invited German CART fans to attend the Rockingham 500. Franchitti, considered by the media to be the pre-race favourite, said a victory at Rockingham would be the highlight of his season and that he wanted to entertain the spectators. Having finished second in the 2001 race, Kenny Bräck believed he could continue his good run of results in Europe and wanted competitive racing. Da Matta said his team had made a large number of adjustments to his racing setup on ovals and hoped his vehicle would be better than it was in Motegi. He believed the race was important and wanted to finish in the first three places. Carpentier said although he was disappointed with his 2001 result at the track, he was convinced he could improve his performance.

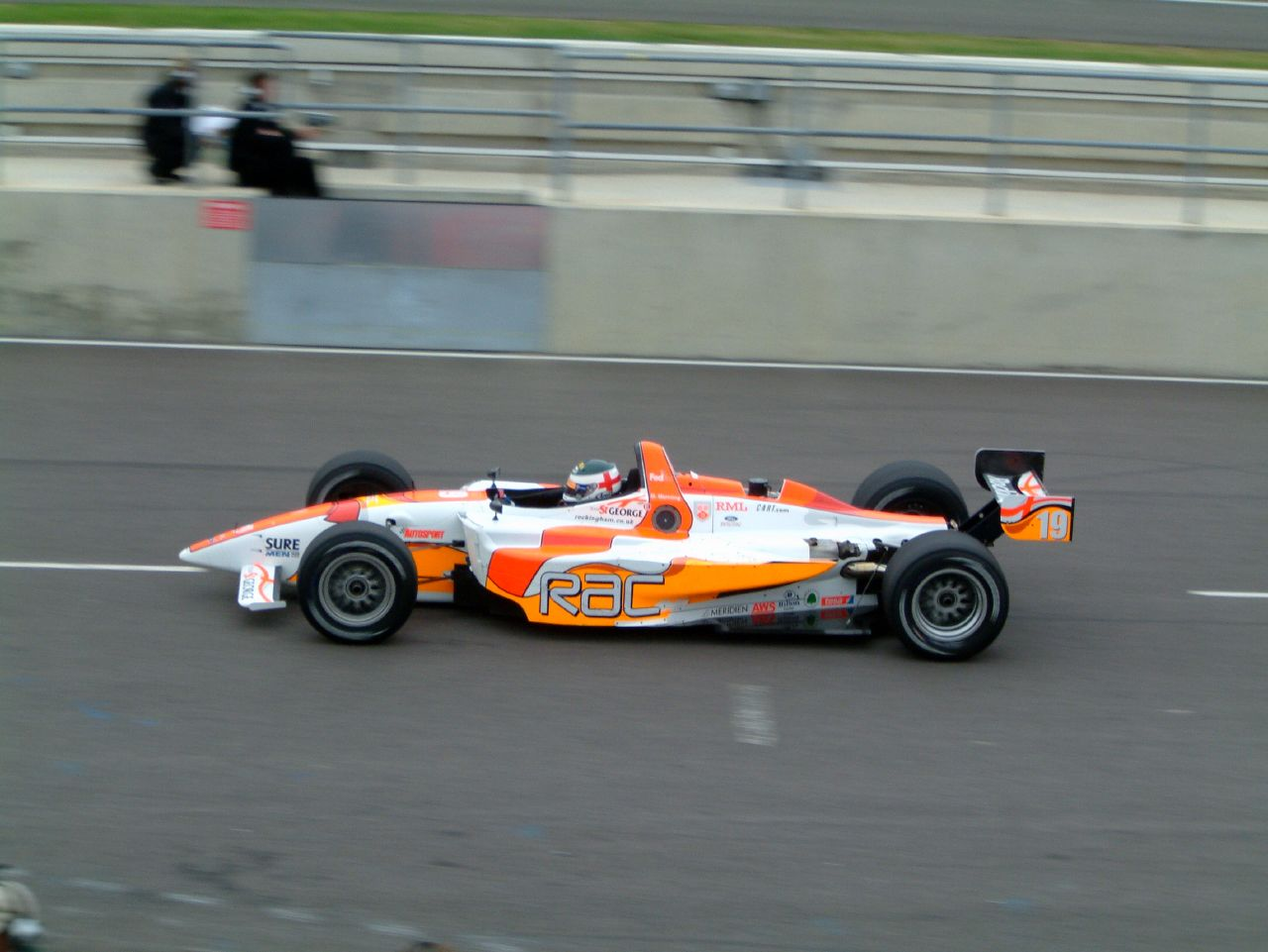
Darren Manning made his CART début at the race for Team St. George

One driver made his début at the race. Dale Coyne Racing (DCR) was formed in what was described as an "all-England" team named Team St. George for a one-race deal with British American Racing Formula One test driver and ASCAR series competitor Darren Manning. He performed 200 miles (320 km) of shakedown running which included a mandatory 100-mile (160 km) test for rookie drivers observed by former CART driver Nicolas Minassian. Manning said of the decision to drive DCR's No. 10 car: "It's something special, a dream come true. To drive a Champ Car is a dream in itself, it's really got some horsepower. But the special thing here is to be a part of Team St. George." He commented he wanted to impress other teams but admitted to having a disadvantage in that he had not competed in the series beforehand.

After heavy rain resulted in drainage problems that affected the previous year's event, workers employed by the track's owners sealed its tarmac surface and added an extra layer of 35 mm (3.5 cm) above it with a sealant allowing for the drainage of standing water. Grace said they had more knowledge of how the track behaved and expected the race to run more smoothly. He noted that people expected more in its second year. Rockingham Motor Speedway's facilities underwent improvements which included the addition of access roads and signage for visiting spectators.

== Practice ==
A single 135-minute practice session on Friday morning preceded Saturday's afternoon race. Alex Tagliani was fastest in the session, which took place in dry, warm weather, with a lap of 24.811 seconds; Tora Takagi, da Matta, Franchitti and Carpentier were in second through fifth. Seven yellow caution flags were shown: the first two were for track inspections, the next two were for debris located in turns three and four. The fifth caution was for Shinji Nakano who stopped at the bottom of turns three and four with smoke billowing from his engine and dropped oil on the track that was cleaned. The sixth was caused by Michel Jourdain Jr. whose engine failed and he stopped between turns three and four; his car was extricated from the circuit. The last was for Scott Dixon who slowed with a loss of engine power on the backstretch.

== Qualifying ==
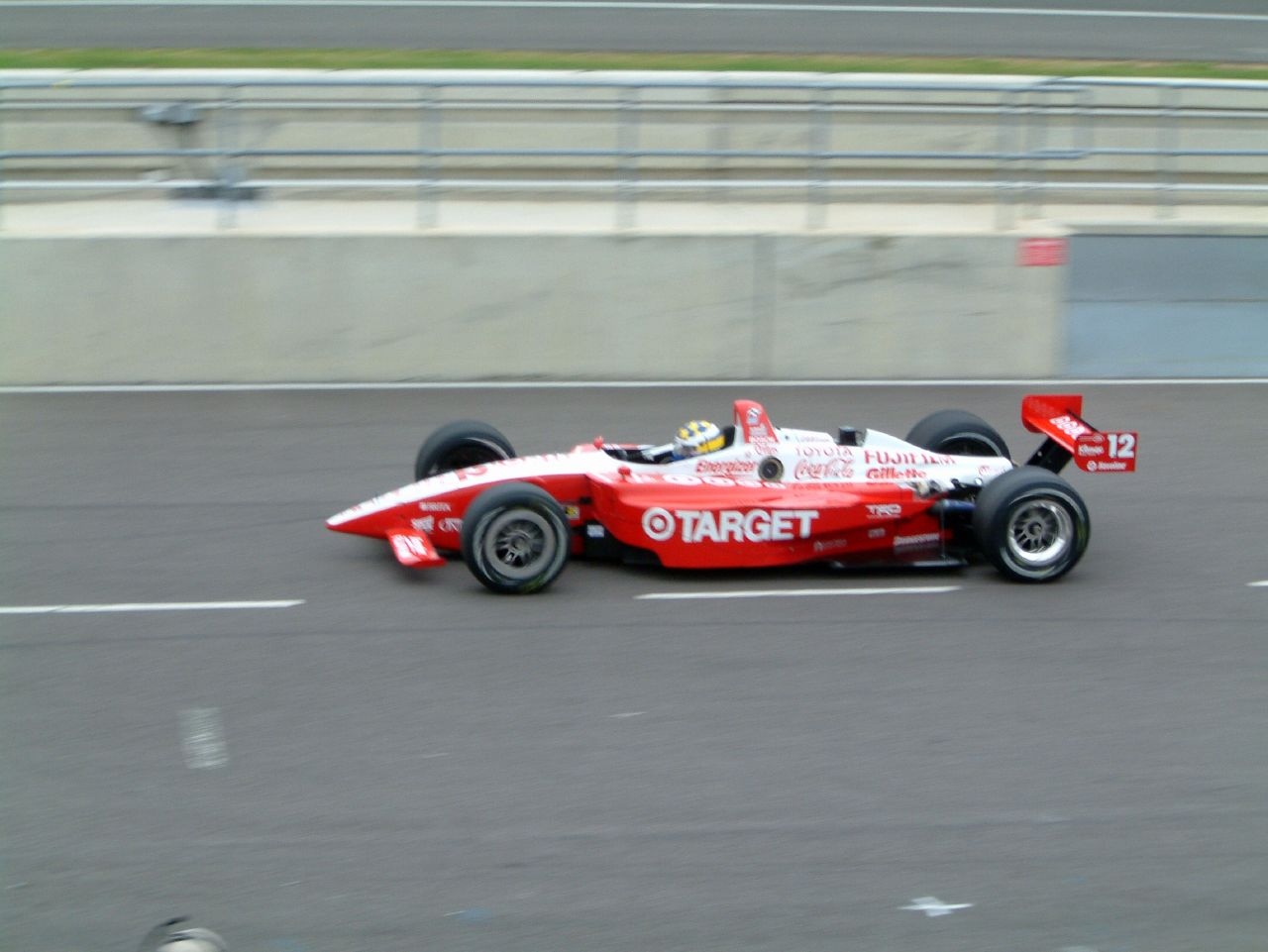
Kenny Bräck had the seventh pole position of his career.

Friday afternoon's 90-minute qualifying session permitted one car on the track in reverse order of the fastest combined practice laps. Each driver ran two laps, with the starting order determined by their fastest times. The session took place in dry and sunny weather. Bräck set the track speed record at Rockingham Motor Speedway to secure his first pole position of the season, the seventh of his CART career, and his second at the circuit, with a time of 24.908 seconds. He was joined on the grid's front row by Michael Andretti who was two-hundredths of a second slower. Da Matta qualified third after removing his foot from the accelerator pedal driving through the fourth turn. Takagi took fourth, and Franchitti started fifth after steering right to the outside on his second lap due to an oversteer that slowed him. Junqueira's car was set up with a large amount of downforce and qualified in sixth. Paul Tracy secured seventh after sliding in the third and fourth turns. Tony Kanaan switched to a back-up car and qualified eighth.

Forsythe Racing teammates Tagliani and Carpentier were ninth and tenth; an electrical problem overheated Carpentier's engine and he was unable to go faster when his blowoff valve opened between the first and second turns. Adrián Fernández was the fastest driver not to qualify in the top ten; his best lap time was more than two-tenths of a second slower than Bräck. Excess oversteer slowed Fittipaldi in turn four and he took 12th. Jimmy Vasser and Oriol Servià took 13th and 14th positions; Servià's car had oversteer after his first timed lap and entered the pit lane for car adjustments to make him faster on his second attempt. Nakano, 15th, had excess understeer which slowed him in turn four. Dixon moved from his back-up car to his primary vehicle for qualifying and took 16th. Manning, 17th, worked on his racing setup though gearbox issues before qualifying prevented his team from focusing on a qualifying tune. Mario Domínguez and Jourdain completed the qualifiers; Jourdain slowed through the third and fourth turns after an oversteer though his reduced speed prevented him from spinning.

=== Qualifying classification ===
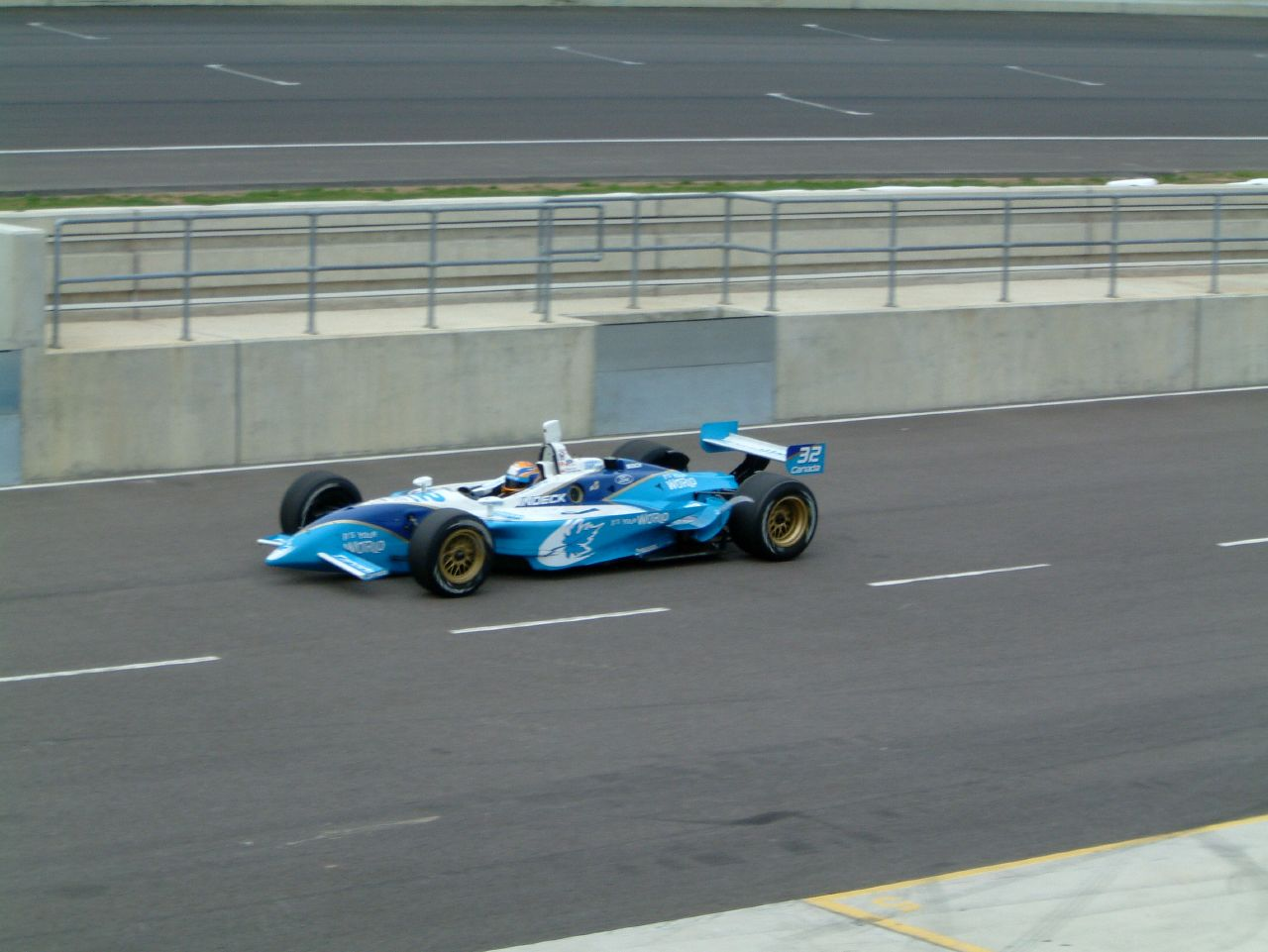
Patrick Carpentier was restricted to qualifying tenth due to an electrical issue affecting the engine but ran strongly in the race to finish third.

Qualifying results
Pos	No.	Driver	Team	Time	Speed	Gap
1	12	Kenny Bräck (SWE)	Chip Ganassi Racing	24.908	213.763	—
2	39	Michael Andretti (USA)	Team Green	24.928	213.591	+0.020
3	6	Cristiano da Matta (BRA)	Newman/Haas Racing	24.954	213.369	+0.046
4	5	Tora Takagi (JPN)	Walker Racing	24.958	213.334	+0.050
5	27	Dario Franchitti (UK)	Team Green	25.001	212.967	+0.093
6	3	Bruno Junqueira (BRA)	Chip Ganassi Racing	25.003	212.950	+0.095
7	26	Paul Tracy (CAN)	Team Green	25.034	212.687	+0.126
8	10	Tony Kanaan (BRA)	Mo Nunn Racing	25.048	212.568	+0.140
9	33	Alex Tagliani (CAN)	Forsythe Racing	25.158	211.638	+0.250
10	32	Patrick Carpentier (CAN)	Forsythe Racing	25.182	211.437	+0.274
11	51	Adrián Fernández (MEX)	Fernández Racing	25.228	211.051	+0.320
12	11	Christian Fittipaldi (BRA)	Newman/Haas Racing	25.251	210.859	+0.343
13	8	Jimmy Vasser (USA)	Team Rahal	25.260	210.784	+0.352
14	20	Oriol Servià (ESP)	Patrick Racing	25.292	210.517	+0.384
15	52	Shinji Nakano (JPN)	Fernández Racing	25.300	210.451	+0.392
16	44	Scott Dixon (NZL)	Chip Ganassi Racing	25.362	209.936	+0.454
17	19	Darren Manning (UK)	Team St. George	25.441	209.284	+0.533
18	55	Mario Domínguez (MEX)	Herdez Competition	25.592	208.049	+0.684
19	9	Michel Jourdain Jr. (MEX)	Team Rahal	25.616	207.854	+0.708

== Warm-up ==
The drivers took to the track at 09:30 British Summer Time (UTC+01:00) for a 30-minute warm-up session in cloudy weather. Andretti continued his strong form by recording the session's fastest lap of 25.205 seconds. Takagi continued to drive quickly and was second-fastest ahead of Carpentier. After the session ended, Franchitti said he felt the race's first laps would be treacherous as the ASCAR support race laid rubber that made the track slippery. He stated his belief that most of the overtaking would occur in the pit lane.

== Race ==
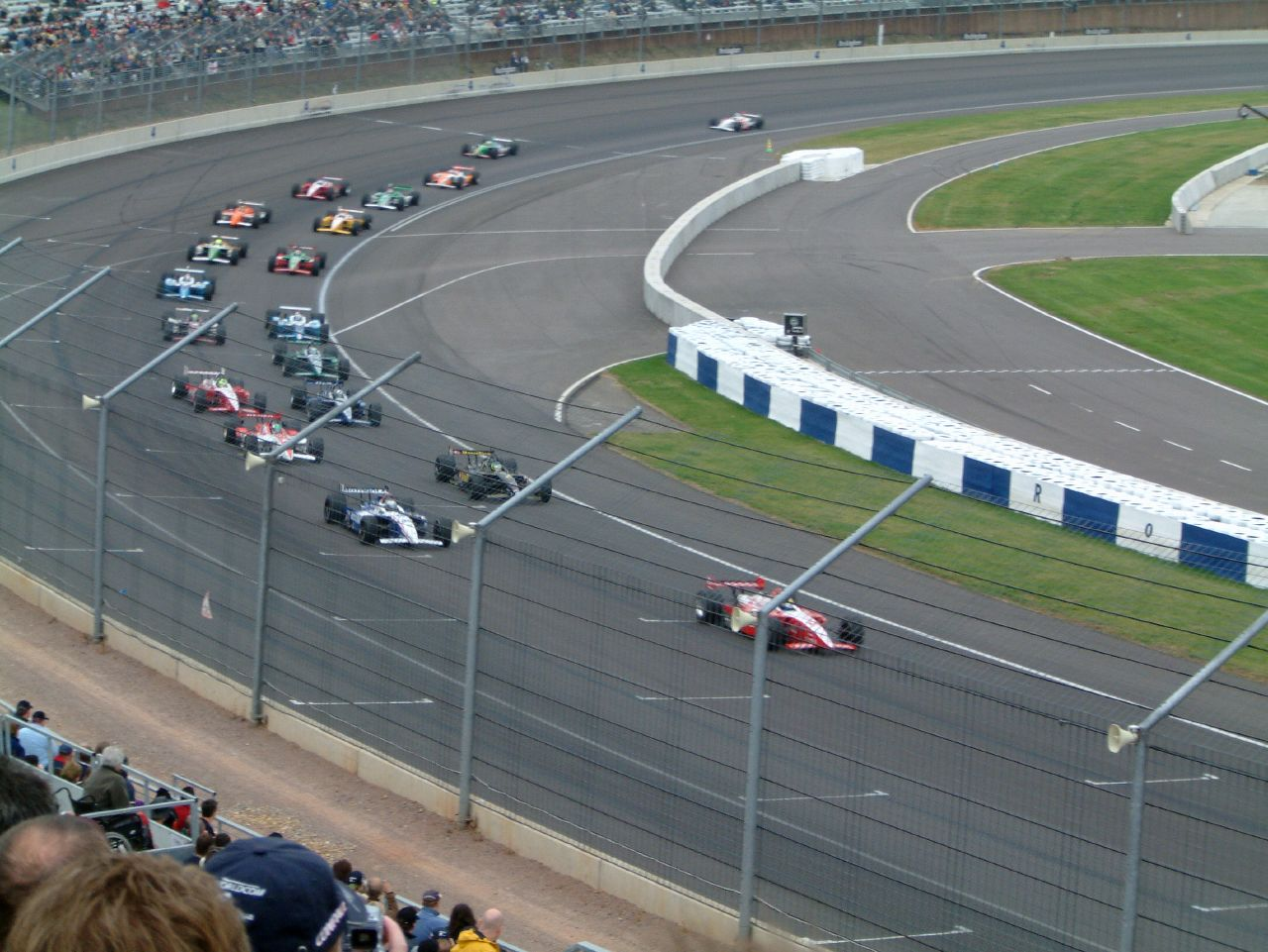
The start of the race.

The weather at the start was cloudy with an air temperature between 16 and 18 °C (61 and 64 °F) and a track temperature from 18 and 20 °C (64 and 68 °F). CART set the mandatory pit stop window to a maximum of 47 laps, requiring every driver to make at least four pit stops. Grace commanded the drivers to start their engines. The race began before an estimated 30,000 spectators at 1:36 p.m. local time. Bräck maintained the lead into the first turn. Tagliani drove alongside his teammate Carpentier and overtook him for ninth place. Serviá moved from 14th to tenth by the end of the first lap, but fell to 11th when another car passed him. He returned to tenth soon after. Junqueira was passed by Tagliani for seventh on lap three. After starting from 12th, Fittipaldi dropped to the rear of the field and was slower than the leading drivers. Tracy slowed without warning on lap 13 in the second turn with a power steering issue, and the first caution of the race was displayed two laps later when he stopped under the white line on the back straight with a gearbox problem requiring course officials to remove his car from the track. His engine's telemetry stopped working indicating a crank sensor failure, possibly caused by his gearbox problem.

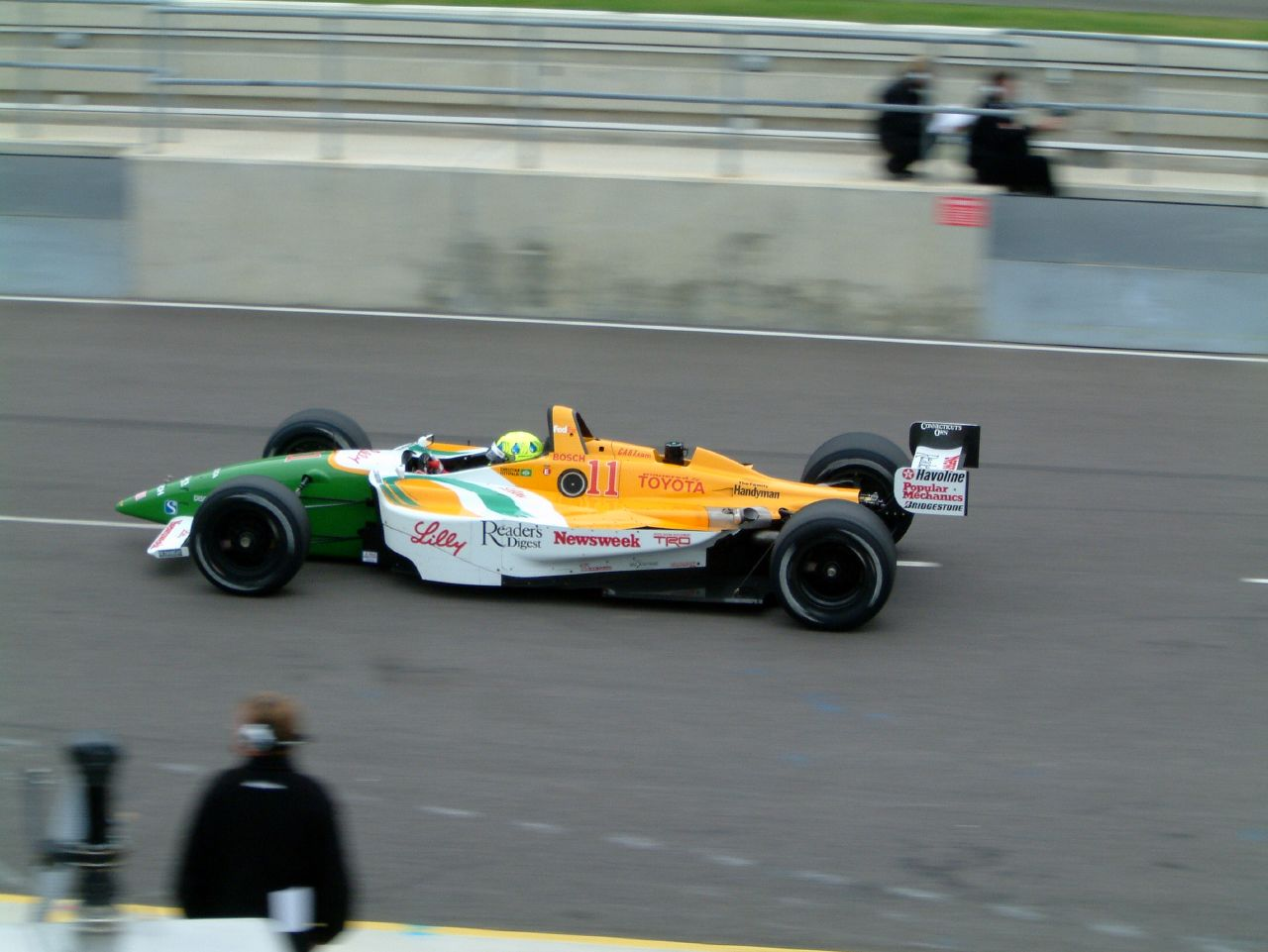
Christian Fittipaldi retired on lap 44 due to engine problems.

Some drivers elected to make pit stops under caution. Fittipaldi had his engine control unit and spark box changed on lap 17 after he reported a problem with his car. Bräck remained the leader at the lap-21 restart and pulled away from the rest of the field. Andretti began to close up to Bräck between laps 31 and 33. Tagliani slowed between the second and third turns on lap 42, and was ordered by his engineer to enter the pit lane. His crew removed his car's left sidepod and retired on the next lap with a battery problem. A second caution was necessitated on the 46th lap when debris was located in turn two. The leaders made their pit stops because of the mandatory pit stop window. Fittipaldi's car problem re-emerged on the 44th lap despite having his vehicle's coils and springs changed; he drove to the pit lane to retire because his team's mechanics could not rectify the issue. Franchitti stalled his car because of a clutch issue. Bräck maintained the lead at the lap-52 restart, followed by Takagi. Nine laps later, Takagi attempted to overtake Bräck on the outside for the lead but was unsuccessful due to the presence of slower cars.

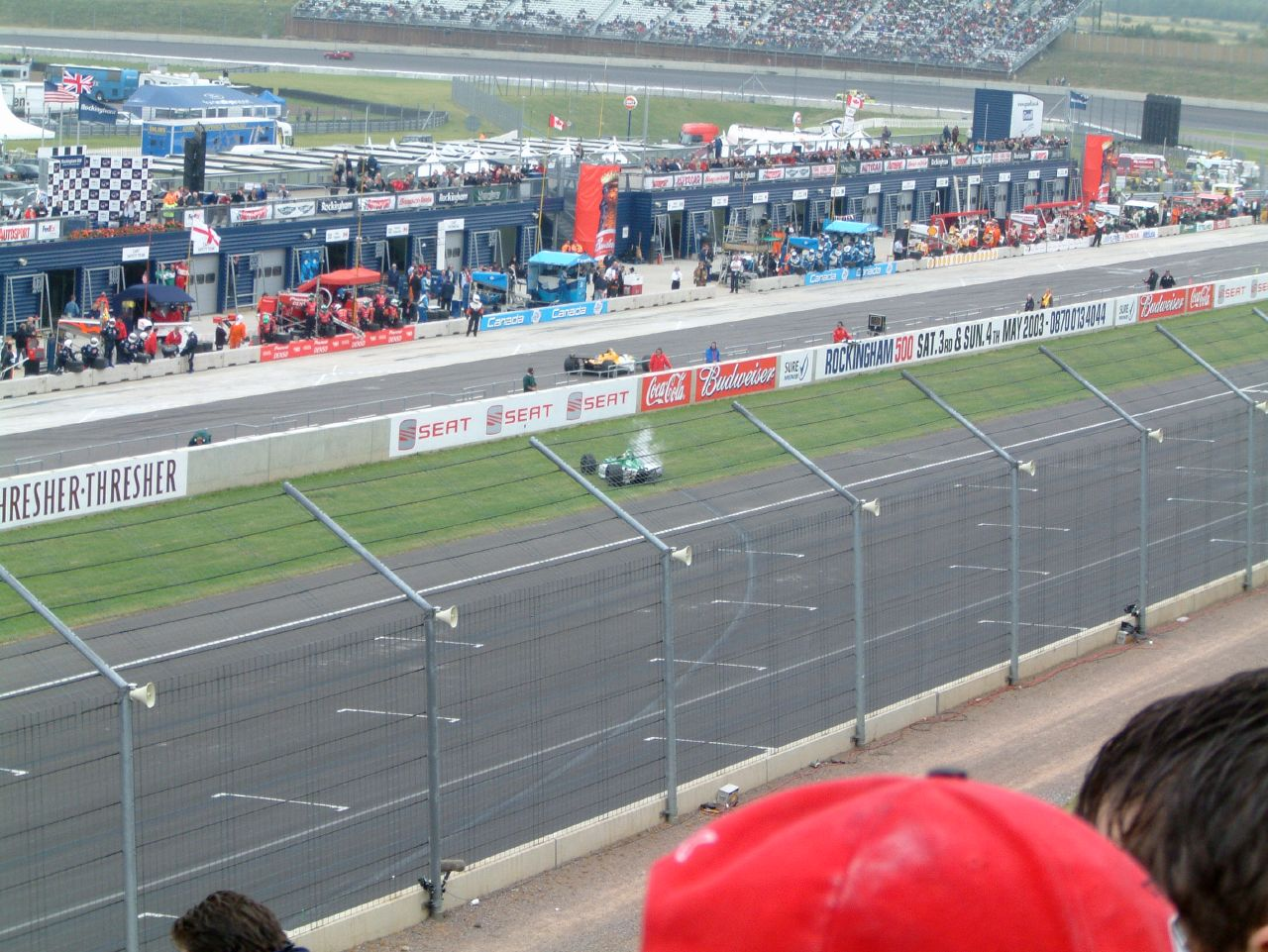
Shinji Nakano crashed after completing 61 laps.

Nakano lost grip in the front of his vehicle and went straight into the turn four wall on the same lap. He heavily damaged his car's right-hand side prompting a third caution. Nakano slid through the infield and stopped unhurt on the frontstretch. Bräck led the field back up to speed at the lap-70 restart, with Takagi in second. Green-flag pit stops began on lap 94, with Bräck stopping on the same lap and Franchitti became the leader. It was part of Franchitti's strategy, devised by his team manager Kyle Moyer, to drive in clean air. Andretti was required to serve a stop-and-go penalty, which he took on the 103rd lap, after he was observed speeding in the pit lane. Franchitti made his pit stop four laps later and Manning took the lead. Manning made his pit stop on lap 114 and Bräck reclaimed the lead. After starting from 16th, Dixon was running in sixth by the 126th lap. He served two stop-and-go penalties because he was twice observed exceeding the pit lane speed limit, while Domínguez was similarly penalised.

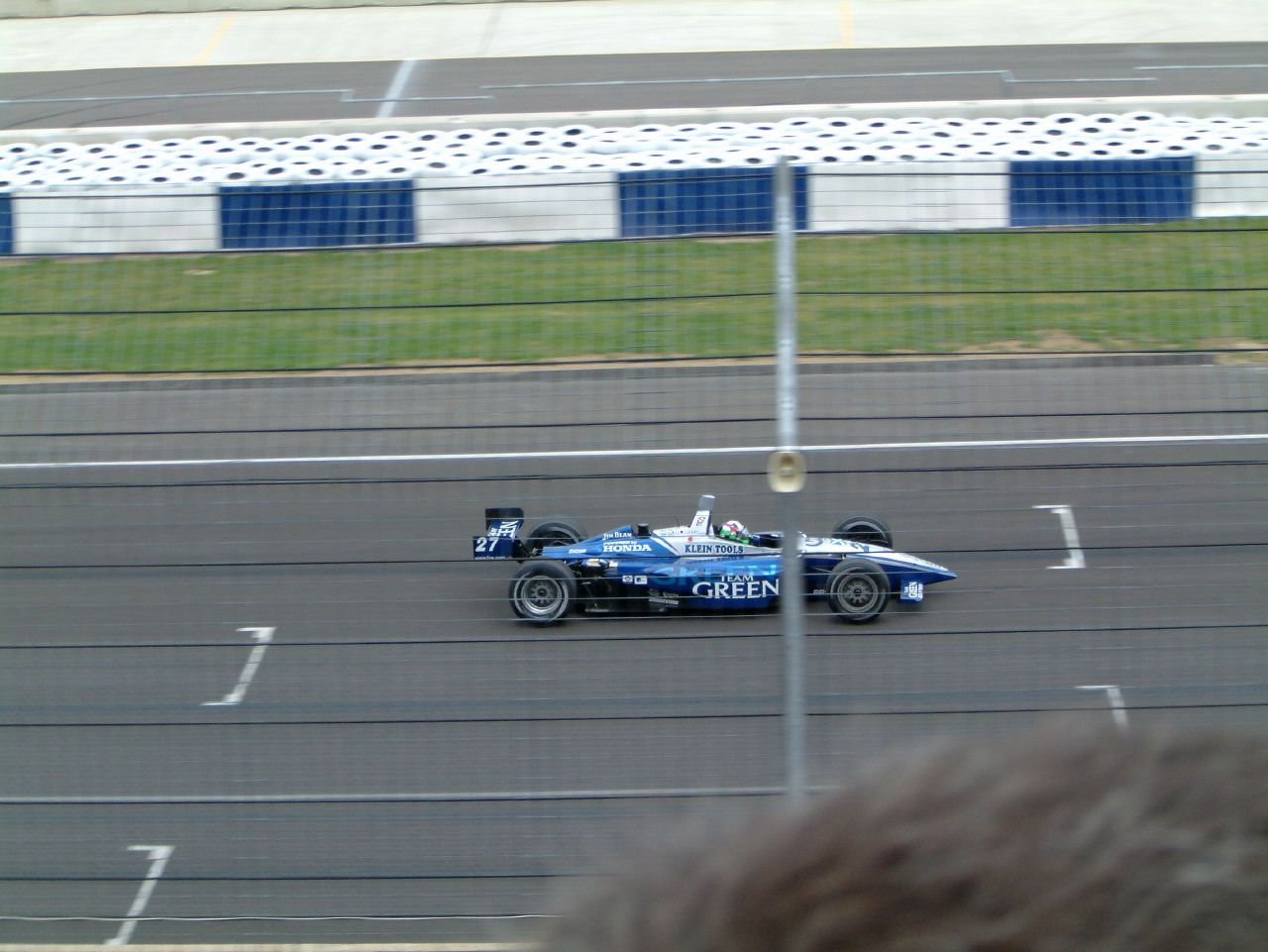
Dario Franchitti clinched his third victory of the season, and his first on an oval track.

The third round of green-flag pit stops commenced fifteen laps later when Bräck became the first driver to stop. Franchitti inherited the lead until he made his pit stop on lap 143, handing it to Manning. This meant Manning became the first driver to lead on his début CART race twice. The fourth caution was necessitated on the 155th lap when Manning's right-hand rear wing endplate detached and landed on the track between the first and second turns. Manning made a pit stop but his crew elected not to repair his rear wing. It assisted in making his car develop less understeer and slightly improved its balance. Racing resumed on lap 163 with Bräck leading a single-file restart. The left side of Kanaan's car collided heavily with the wall on the backstraight six laps later, triggering the fifth (and final) caution. All drivers including Bräck made pit stops under caution. A crew member on Bräck's team dropped a left-rear wheel nut dropping him to ninth. Fernández was observed speeding and was required to move to the rear of the field. Da Matta's team were slow to fit his right-rear tyre preventing him from taking the lead and he emerged in second.

Franchitti gained the lead and held it at the lap-180 restart. Junqueira attempted to pass Servià on the inside for fourth but was unsuccessful. Carpentier attempted to pressure da Matta towards the end but found it difficult to overtake and he did not want to be aggressive by going off the racing line. Vasser set the race's fastest lap during the 210th (and penultimate) lap, competing a circuit of 25.217 seconds. Franchitti maintained the lead for the remainder of the race and crossed the start-finish line after 211 laps to take his third victory of the season, his first on an oval track in CART, and the tenth of his career. Da Matta was second, ahead of Carpentier in third, Servià was fourth and Junqueira fifth. Takagi, Vasser, Bräck, Manning, and Andretti rounded out the top ten finishers. Jourdain, Dixon, and Domínguez were the final classified finishers. There were nine lead changes in the race; four drivers reached the front of the field. Bräck's total of 134 laps led was the highest of any competitor. Franchitti led three times, for a total of 58 laps.

=== Post-race ===
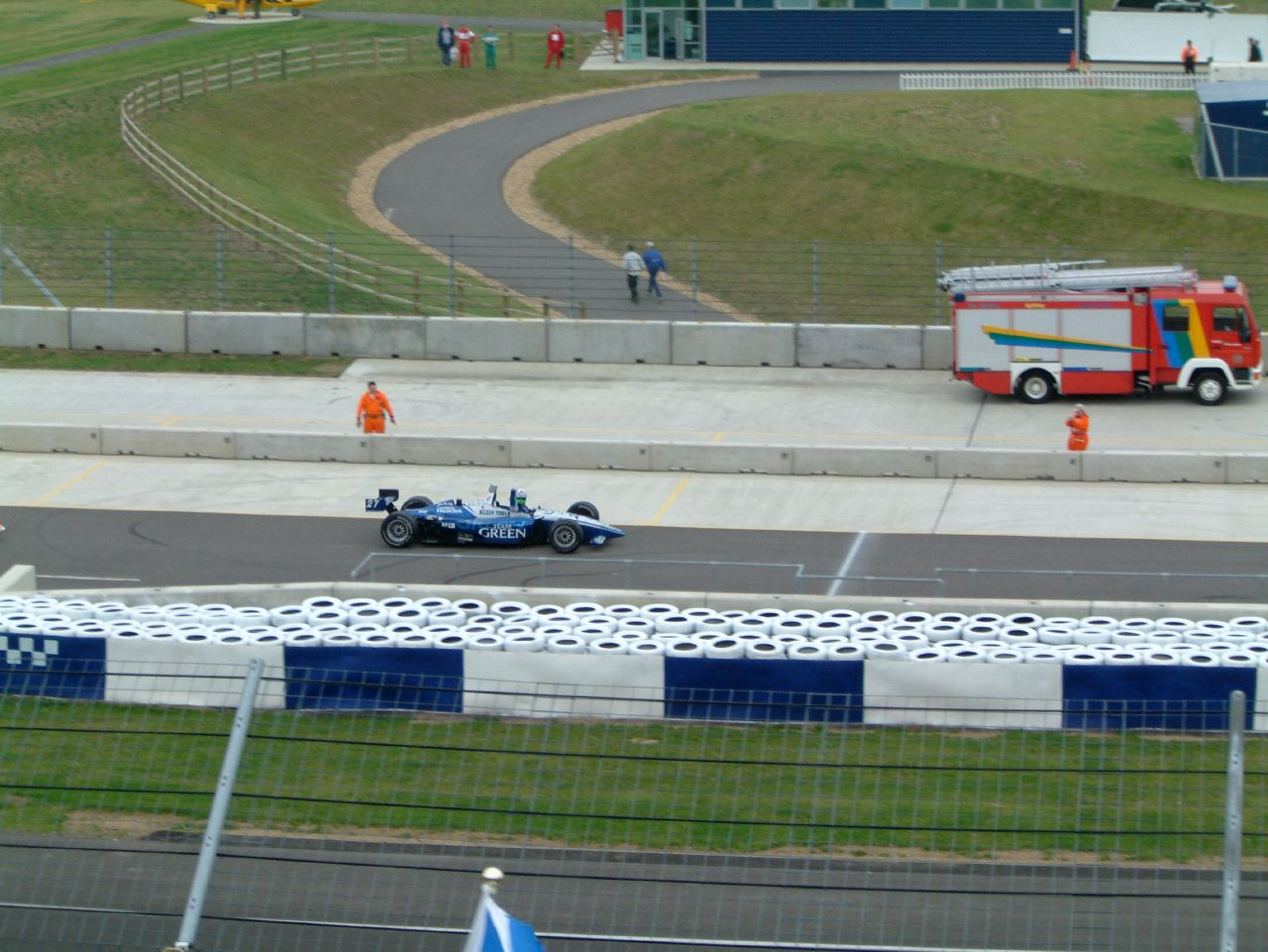
Franchitti celebrating winning the event.

The top three drivers appeared on the podium to collect their trophies and spoke to the media at a press conference. Franchitti was happy with the victory, saying that he did not believe that it would be different to win at the track but that it was "very, very special" despite thinking after his first pit stop he would not achieve victory. Da Matta stated that he was worried about his advantage in the points standings and felt he had the car to win the race. He added that he could not relax because other drivers still had a mathematical chance of clinching the championship, though he was pleased with the result. Third-place finisher Carpentier said he was happy with his position and that it was a good day for his team. He revealed that changes made to his aerodynamic setup worked on the rolling restarts although it slowed him on the backstraight. Franchitti's race engineer Allen McDonald praised his driver, saying his first victory on an oval track was one that he would remember and that it was an "unbelievable day".

Manning said while finishing ninth in his début race was one his team felt was a "fantastic result", he was disappointed that he was unable to get practice runs before qualifying as he felt that he could have started in a higher position. Bräck stated that he lost the chance of victory when a crew member dropped a wheel nut on his final pit stop, saying: "There is something hanging over us. I do my part, they do their part. When everyone is having a good day you win. If not, you lose." Fernández was angry with the pit lane speeding penalty, saying he felt he could have achieved a better finishing position and that the rule on pit lane speeding could "ruin your day". After the race, he spent several hours discussing the penalty with race officials. John Lopes, the CART Vice President of Racing Operations, later stated that the series would investigate the rules regarding pit lane speeding penalties but affirmed that no action could be taken until after the season's end.

Rick Broadbent, writing in The Times, said that due to his victory, Franchitti should have become "a household name" and felt that his future career prospects would be unhindered. Mike Nicks in The Observer called Franchitti's win "the greatest of his career", while Jim McGill of Scotland on Sunday noted that while Formula One was promoted as the fastest and most glamorous motorsport, he wrote of his feeling that Franchitti's victory allowed CART to showcase its more "dramatic" action. Grace remarked on the possible implications of Franchitti's success on the promotion of CART in the United Kingdom, "If that doesn't sell this sport to Britain then I don't know what will." The Stamford Mercury & Citizen said the sound of the cars at the circuit was "one of those sporting moments which stand up the hairs on the back of your head."

The result increased da Matta's advantage over Junqueira in the Drivers' Championship by five points. Franchitti remained in third but decreased his deficit to sit seven points behind Junqueira. Carpentier maintained fourth with 115 points, and Fittipaldi remained in fifth on 98 points. Toyota extended their lead over Honda in the Manufacturers' Championship to 32 points. Ford Cosworth maintained third position on 192 points, with four races left in the season. Highlights of the event were shown the day after in the United Kingdom on the BBC Two sports programme Sunday Grandstand with commentary provided by former racing drivers Johnny Herbert and Charlie Cox. A total of 60 million television viewers in 190 countries watched the race. The event was the last to be held at the Rockingham Motor Speedway as the United Kingdom race was moved to Brands Hatch, Kent for 2003.

=== Race classification ===
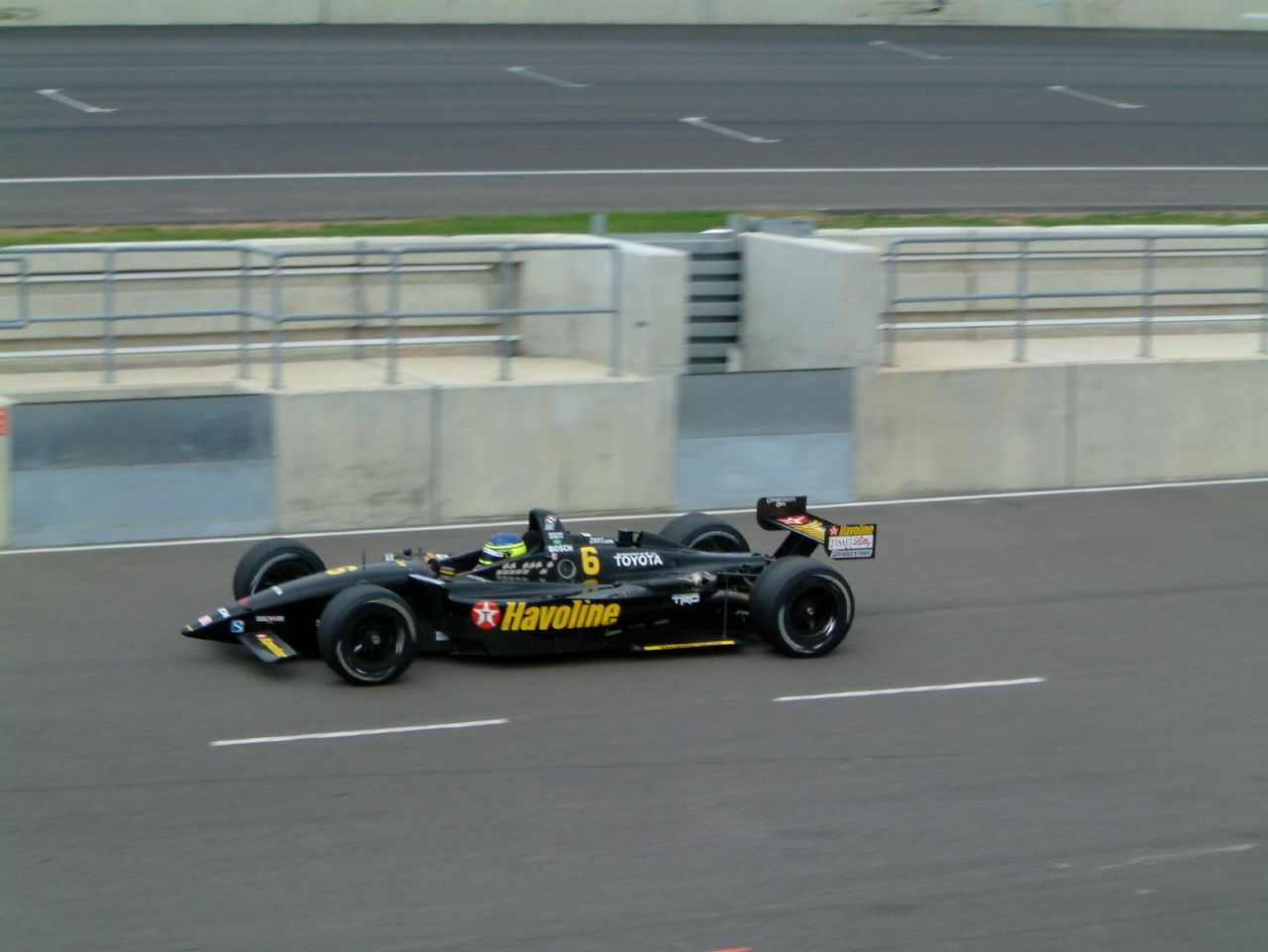
Cristiano da Matta started from third and finished in second place to increase his Drivers' Championship advantage.

Race results
Pos	No.	Driver	Team	Laps	Time/Retired	Grid	Points
1	27	Dario Franchitti (UK)	Team Green	211	1:58:44.754	5	20
2	6	Cristiano da Matta (BRA)	Newman/Haas Racing	211	+0.986	3	16
3	32	Patrick Carpentier (CAN)	Forsythe Racing	211	+2.785	10	14
4	20	Oriol Servià (ESP)	Patrick Racing	211	+3.757	14	12
5	4	Bruno Junqueira (BRA)	Chip Ganassi Racing	211	+4.281	6	10
6	5	Tora Takagi (JPN)	Walker Racing	211	+4.778	4	8
7	8	Jimmy Vasser (USA)	Team Rahal	211	+5.132	13	6
8	12	Kenny Bräck (SWE)	Chip Ganassi Racing	211	+13.912	1	7
9	19	Darren Manning (UK)	Team St. George	211	+15.863	17	4
10	39	Michael Andretti (USA)	Team Green	209	+ 2 Laps	2	3
11	9	Michel Jourdain Jr. (MEX)	Team Rahal	209	+ 2 Laps	19	2
12	44	Scott Dixon (NZL)	Chip Ganassi Racing	209	+ 2 Laps	16	1
13	55	Mario Domínguez (MEX)	Herdez Competition	209	+ 2 Laps	18	0
14	51	Adrián Fernández (MEX)	Fernández Racing	186	Retired	11	0
15	10	Tony Kanaan (BRA)	Mo Nunn Racing	167	Contact	8	0
16	52	Shinji Nakano (JPN)	Fernández Racing	61	Contact	15	0
17	11	Christian Fittipaldi (BRA)	Newman/Haas Racing	44	Engine	12	0
18	33	Alex Tagliani (CAN)	Forsythe Racing	42	Battery lead	9	0
19	26	Paul Tracy (CAN)	Team Green	12	Gearbox	7	0

== Standings after the race ==
Drivers' Championship standings
Rank	+/–	Driver	Points
1		Cristiano da Matta (BRA)	191
2		Bruno Junqueira (BRA)	133 (−58)
3		Dario Franchitti (GBR)	126 (−65)
4		Patrick Carpentier (CAN)	115 (−76)
5		Christian Fittipaldi (BRA)	98 (−93)

Constructors' standings
Rank	+/–	Constructor	Points
1		Lola (UK)	313
2		Reynard (UK)	181 (−132)

Manufacturers' standings
Rank	+/–	Manufacturer	Points
1		Toyota (JPN)	266
2		Honda (JPN)	234 (−32)
3		Ford Cosworth (GBR)	192 (−74)

- Note: Only the top five positions are included for the drivers' standings.

Previous race: 2002 Shell Grand Prix of Denver	CART FedEx Championship Series; 2002 season	Next race: 2002 Grand Prix Americas
Previous race: 2001 Rockingham 500	2002 Sure for Men Rockingham 500	Next race: Final Event
