= Rockingham Motor Speedway =

Racetrack

- The "oval" speedway (2001–2018)

- International Super Sports Car Circuit (2001–2018)
- Location: Rockingham, Northamptonshire, England, United Kingdom
- Coordinates: 52°30′54″N 0°39′27″W
- Capacity: 52,000
- Broke ground: 1999
- Opened: 15 January 2001; 25 years ago
- Closed: 24 November 2018; 7 years ago
- Major events: Former: CART; Rockingham 500 (2001–2002); BTCC (2003, 2007–2018); British GT (2001–2003, 2006–2018); BRDC British F3 (2015–2018); British F3 (2002–2003, 2007–2014); BSB (2001–2003); ASCAR (2001–2008); EuroBOSS (2001)

Oval Circuit (2001–2018)
- Surface: Tarmac
- Length: 1.479 mi (2.380 km)
- Turns: 4
- Banking: 3.5 – 7.9º
- Race lap record: 0:25.217 (211.144 mph (339.803 km/h)) ( (United States) Jimmy Vasser, Lola B02/00, 2002, CART)

International Super Sports Car Long Circuit (2001–2018)
- Surface: Tarmac
- Length: 2.050 mi (3.299 km)
- Turns: 13
- Banking: 7.0º (turn 1)
- Race lap record: 1:18.627 ( (United Kingdom) Jack Harvey, Dallara F312, 2012, F3)

International Super Sports Car Circuit (2001–2018)
- Surface: Tarmac
- Length: 1.940 mi (3.122 km)
- Turns: 12
- Race lap record: 1:12.620 ( (Estonia) Marko Asmer, Dallara F307, 2007, F3)

International Long Circuit (2001–2018)
- Surface: Tarmac
- Length: 2.560 mi (4.120 km)
- Turns: 16
- Race lap record: 1:32.880 ( (United Kingdom) Tony Worswick, Jordan 194, 2001, F1)

International Short Circuit (2001–2018)
- Surface: Tarmac
- Length: 2.436 mi (3.920 km)
- Turns: 14
- Race lap record: 1:29.183 ( (Brazil) Nelson Piquet Jr., Dallara F303, 2002, F3)

Superbike Circuit (2001–2018)
- Surface: Tarmac
- Length: 1.740 mi (2.800 km)
- Turns: 13
- Race lap record: 1:09.893 ( (Japan) Yukio Kagayama, Suzuki GSX-R1000, 2003, SBK)

National Circuit (2001–2018)
- Surface: Tarmac
- Length: 1.700 mi (2.736 km)
- Turns: 9

Lake Circuit (2001–2018)
- Surface: Tarmac
- Length: 0.670 mi (1.078 km)
- Turns: 5

Handling Circuit (2001–2018)
- Surface: Tarmac
- Length: 0.970 mi (1.561 km)
- Turns: 4

Rockingham Motor Speedway was a motorsport racing venue in Rockingham, Northamptonshire, England, near the town of Corby. The venue sits unused due to private ownership by Constellation Automotive. It hosted professional and club races, as well as testing, track days, driver training, exhibitions and conferences. The speedway claimed to be Europe's fastest racing circuit, and was the first banked oval constructed in Britain since the closure of Brooklands in 1939.

The venue entered administration in 2017 and hosted its final motor race in November 2018. In 2021, the facility was purchased by Constellation Automotive for £80 million.

== History ==
Construction of Rockingham started late in 1999, with the opening meeting planned for May 2001.

Rockingham Motor Speedway was constructed on a British Steel works brown field site known as the Deene Iron Ore Quarry which gave the facility its original name of Deene Raceway. The Speedway was built as a banked oval with the intention of bringing the American oval racing, both NASCAR Stock Cars and the CART Indycars, across the Atlantic for the first time. The opportunity was also taken to use the vast infield to build a combination of road circuits (most as Rovals using parts of the Speedway) aimed at both national and international use.

After almost ten years of planning and 23 months of construction work, Rockingham opened for business on Monday 15 January 2001. It was formally opened by Queen Elizabeth II on 26 May 2001.

After the sale of the venue, Rockingham held a "super send-off" to mark its final day as a racing circuit on 24 November 2018. The circuit was sold to Rockingham Automotive Limited, who used the facility for vehicle storage and logistics. In mid-2021, Constellation Automotive, who own brands such as Cinch and We Buy Any Car, purchased the site.

Since then, Constellation Automotive's online car sales brand, Cinch, has used the circuit to film YouTube content, including car reviews and lap time challenges, titled on its channel as 'Fast Laps'. Cinch Motoring Editor, Sam Sheehan, has driven cars ranging from the Hyundai i20N hot hatch to a road-legal track car produced by Spartan Motor Company.

Sheehan used the Spartan to set an overall lap record for Rockingham's National Circuit on 26 May 2023, beating the previous fastest time of 1:14.20, set by a Palmer Jaguar JP1 prototype, by five-hundredths of a second.

== The circuit ==
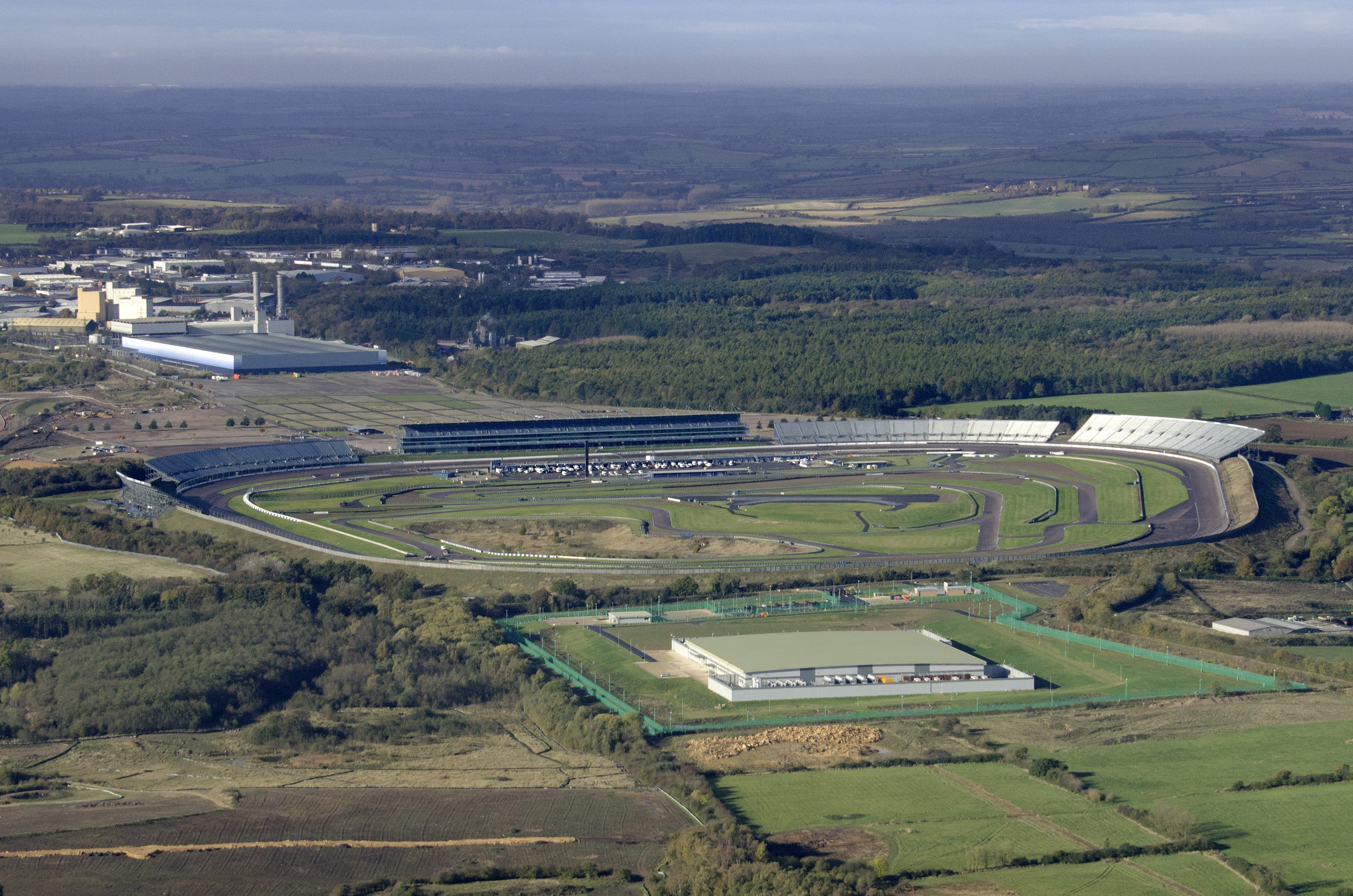
Aerial view of Rockingham Motor Speedway

Rockingham had 13 configurations of track, which could be used for anything from touring cars to motorcycles to rally cars. The circuit was overlooked by the 6280 seat Rockingham Building, a steel-framed, glass-fronted grandstand building containing suites, offices, bars and kitchens, and by four grandstands. Together, the building and grandstands offered a total seating capacity of 52,000. The inner pit and paddock complex was accessed from the Rockingham Building via two pedestrian tunnels and there was a further spectator viewing area on top of the pit garages.

=== The oval circuit ===
The 1.479 mi (2.380 km) American-style banked oval circuit was 60 ft (18.3 m) wide and had a maximum bank angle of seven degrees and comprised four very distinct corners. Rockingham's oval was unique in the UK and one of only two speedways in Europe (the other being Lausitzring). The oval circuit could also be converted to a road course layout for events by positioning temporary chicanes and curves both on the main area and apron of the circuit.

In early September 2001, the Champ cars came to Germany and England for the first time, to contest oval racing at the German 500 (kilometer, not miles) and the Rockingham 500, rounds of the 2001 CART season (Championship Auto Racing Teams) FedEx Championship Series. After the 11 September terrorist attacks and subsequent closing of airspaces, but with most equipment and personnel already being in continental Europe, the first ever German 500 was held under difficult circumstances. Unreliable weather and a bad crash of Alex Zanardi did not help, either.

The British round at the weekend of 20–22 September was in jeopardy, too. However, the logistics were worked out, with many of the teams stripping off their sponsors' logos ("livery") as a mark of respect for the victims of the attacks. The race distance was also shortened to 300 km. Victory was snatched on the exit of Turn Four of the last lap by Gil de Ferran driving the Marlboro Team Penske Honda–powered Reynard 01I at a race average speed of 153.41 mph (246.89 km/h) from Kenny Bräck at the wheel of the Team Rahal Lola-Ford Cosworth B1/00, and the Newman-Haas Racing Lola-Toyota B1/00 driven by Cristiano da Matta. The fastest lap, and therefore outright lap record, was set by Patrick Carpentier in 25.551secs (210.59 mph (338.91 km/h)) in the Player's Forsythe Racing Reynard-Cosworth. Carpentier became the first Canadian to ever hold the outright lap record at an English circuit.

The US-based series returned in September 2002. This was the last time Champ Cars raced at this facility. The race ran over the full distance of 500 km, Scotland's Dario Franchitti took the chequered flag in his Team KOOL Green Lola-Honda, beating Cristiano da Matta by just 0.986 of a second.

=== The International Super Sportscar Circuit (ISSC) ===
The ISSC was 1.940 mi (3.122 km) long and between 36 and 60 ft (11 and 18.3 m) wide, with a maximum bank angle of seven degrees at turn one. Rockingham's International Super Sportscar Circuit was used by the Dunlop MSA British Touring Car Championship, as well as for most other car race events. The circuit combined long straights, sweeping high-speed bends (including the infamous Turn 1 and Gracelands) with a lower speed, highly technical infield layout. Average lap speeds around the circuit ranged from 1m 24s in the BTCC to 1m 12s in British F3.

=== Wet handling facility ===
The site had a wet handling area with a kick plate which was used to simulate a variety of driving conditions including ice, rain and slippery wet leaves. These different road conditions were simulated at much slower speeds than in normal driving and in a fully controlled environment. The area was designed to give drivers a greater understanding of the latest ABS, traction control and crash mitigating technologies, and the way that they affect vehicle control.

=== Layout configurations ===
Oval Circuit (2001–2018)

International Super Sports Car Circuit (2001–2018)

International Long Circuit (2001–2018)

International Short Circuit (2001–2018)

National Circuit (2001–2018)

== Lap records ==
Rockingham is Europe's fastest banked oval racing circuit, with the unofficial lap record for the 1.479 mi (2.380 km) oval set at 0:24.719 by Tony Kanaan in his Lola B01/00 Champ Car on 22 September 2001 – an average speed of 215.397 mph (346.648 km/h). Rockingham was the first purpose-built banked oval in the UK since Brooklands in 1907. It has an all-seating capacity of 52,000 and has both an oval and a racing circuit. The fastest official race lap records at Rockingham Motor Speedway are listed as:

Category	Time	Driver	Vehicle	Event
Oval (2001–2018): 1.479 mi (2.380 km)
Champ Car	0:25.217	(United States) Jimmy Vasser	Lola B02/00	2002 Sure for Men Rockingham 500
Stock car racing	0:34.475	(United Kingdom) Ben Collins	Chevrolet Monte Carlo	2003 6th Rockingham ASCAR round
Pickup truck racing	0:40.391	(United Kingdom) Michael Smith	PickupSport Pickup 2.0 16v	2009 Rockingham Pickup Truck Racing round
International Super Sports Car Circuit (2001–2018): 1.940 mi (3.122 km)
Formula Three	1:12.620	(Estonia) Marko Asmer	Dallara F307	2007 Rockingham British F3 round
Formula Palmer Audi	1:17.329	(Spain) José Alonso Liste	Formula Palmer Audi car	2010 Rockingham Formula Palmer Audi round
GT3	1:17.769	(Denmark) Marco Sorensen	Aston Martin V12 Vantage GT3	2018 Rockingham British GT round
Formula 4	1:18.898	(United Kingdom) Lando Norris	Mygale M14-F4	2015 Rockingham MSA Formula round
Formula BMW	1:20.978	(United Kingdom) Henry Surtees	Mygale FB02	2007 Rockingham Formula BMW UK round
Formula Ford	1:21.633	(United Kingdom) Callum MacLeod	Mygale SJ07	2007 Rockingham British Formula Ford round
GT2	1:22.872	(United Kingdom) Luke Hines	Panoz Esperante GTLM	2006 Rockingham British GT round
NGTC	1:23.193	(United Kingdom) Gordon Shedden	Honda Civic Type R (FK2)	2015 Rockingham BTCC round
GT4	1:23.642	(Denmark) Patrik Matthiesen	Ginetta G55 GT4	2018 Rockingham British GT round
Super 2000	1:24.588	(United Kingdom) Jason Plato	Chevrolet Cruze	2011 Rockingham BTCC round
BTC Touring	1:24.698	(United Kingdom) Tom Onslow-Cole	BTC-T Vauxhall Vectra	2008 Rockingham BTCC round
SEAT León Supercopa	1:48.334	(Republic of Ireland) Gavin Smith	SEAT León Cupra R	2003 Rockingham SEAT Cupra Championship round
International Super Sports Car Long Circuit (2001–2018): 2.050 mi (3.299 km)
Formula Three	1:18.627	(United Kingdom) Jack Harvey	Dallara F312	2012 Rockingham British F3 round
LMP675	1:23.803	(United Kingdom) Mike Millard	Rapier SR2	2013 Rockingham Britcar Endurance GT round
GT3	1:25.145	(United Kingdom) Phil Keen	Porsche 911 (997) GT3-R	2012 Rockingham British GT round
GT4	1:31.164	(United Kingdom) Philip Glew	Lotus Evora GT4	2012 Rockingham British GT round
International Short Road Course (2001–2018): 2.436 mi (3.920 km)
Formula Three	1:29.183	(Brazil) Nelson Piquet Jr.	Dallara F303	2003 Rockingham British F3 round
GT1	1:37.918	(United Kingdom) Colin Blower	Ultima GTR	2003 Rockingham British GT round
Formula BMW	1:38.790	(United Kingdom) Matthew Howson	Mygale FB02	2005 Rockingham Formula BMW UK round
Formula Ford	1:39.217	(United Kingdom) Tom Gaymor	Van Diemen RF03	2003 Rockingham British Formula Ford round
Porsche Carrera Cup	1:40.310	(United Kingdom) Barry Horne	Porsche 911 (996) GT3 Cup	2003 Rockingham Porsche Carrera Cup GB round
BTC Touring	1:43.592	(United Kingdom) Alan Morrison	BTC-T Honda Civic Type-R	2003 Rockingham BTCC round
International Long Road Course (2001–2018): 2.560 mi (4.120 km)
Formula One	1:32.880	(United Kingdom) Tony Worswick	Jordan 194	2001 Rockingham EuroBOSS round
Formula Three	1:33.817	(United Kingdom) Robbie Kerr	Dallara F302	2002 Rockingham British F3 round
GT1 (GTS)	1:41.536	(United Kingdom) Ian McKellar	Saleen S7-R	2002 Rockingham British GT round
GT2	1:43.211	(United Kingdom) Tim Sugden	Porsche 911 (996) GT3-R	2002 Rockingham British GT round
Superbike Course (2001–2018): 1.740 mi (2.800 km)
SBK	1:09.893	(Japan) Yukio Kagayama	Suzuki GSX-R1000	2003 Rockingham BSB round
Supersport	1:11.429	(United Kingdom) Stuart Easton	Ducati 748 R	2003 Rockingham BSB round

== Major racing results ==
=== CART Championship ===
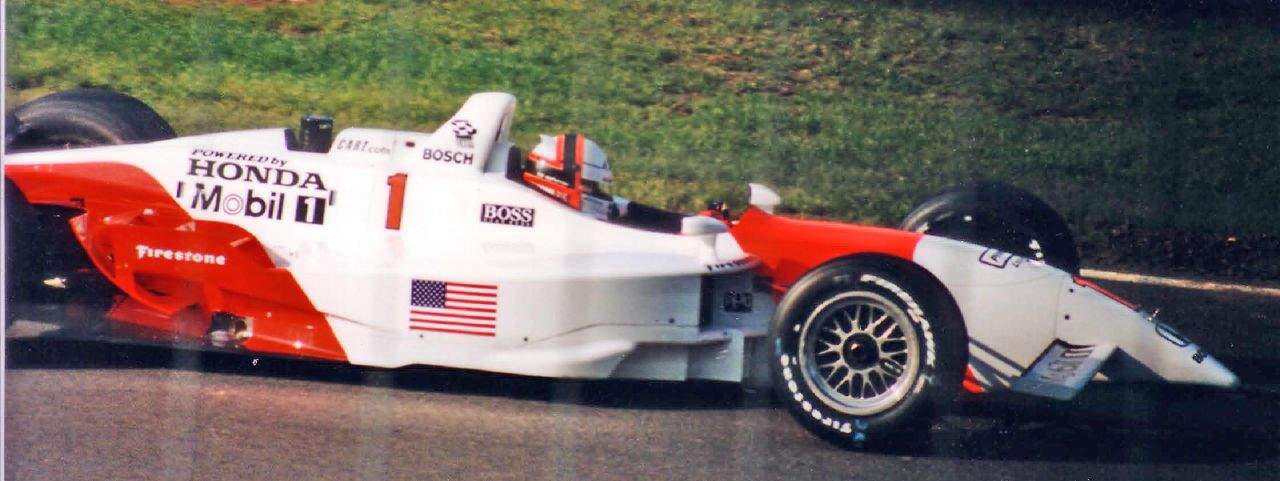
Gil de Ferran on his way to victory in the 2001 Rockingham 500

Year	Race	Driver	Constructor
2001	Rockingham 500 +	(Brazil) Gil de Ferran	Reynard 01I
2002	Sure For Men Rockingham 500	(Scotland) Dario Franchitti	Lola B02/00

+ Race shortened due to lack of practice.

=== British Formula Three season ===
Year	Race	Driver	Car
2002	Green Flag British F3 Championship, Rd 17	(Japan) Shinya Hosokawa	Dallara-Mugen-Honda F302
	Green Flag British F3 Championship, Rd 18	(England) Robbie Kerr	Dallara-Mugen-Honda F302
2003	Green Flag British F3 Championship, Rd 15	(Brazil) Nelson Piquet Jr.	Dallara-Mugen-Honda F303
	Green Flag British F3 Championship, Rd 16	(England) Jamie Green	Dallara-Mugen-Honda F303
2007	Lloyds TSB Insurance British F3 Championship, Rd 21	(Estonia) Marko Asmer	Dallara-Mercedes F307
	Lloyds TSB Insurance British F3 Championship, Rd 22	(Germany) Maro Engel	Dallara-Mugen-Honda F307
2008	British F3 Championship, Rd 7	(Finland) Atte Mustonen	Dallara-Mercedes F308
	British F3 Championship, Rd 8	(Sweden) Sebastian Hohenthal	Dallara-Mercedes F308
2009	Cooper Tires British F3 Championship, Rd 5	(England) Nick Tandy	Mygale-Mercedes M-08 F3
	Cooper Tires British F3 Championship, Rd 6	(Sweden) Marcus Ericsson	Dallara-Mercedes F309
2010	Cooper Tires British F3 Championship, Rd 13	(France) Jean-Éric Vergne	Dallara-Volkswagen F310
	Cooper Tires British F3 Championship, Rd 14	(England) Daniel McKenzie	Dallara-Mercedes F310
	Cooper Tires British F3 Championship, Rd 15	(Brazil) Felipe Nasr	Dallara-Volkswagen F308
2011	Cooper Tires British F3 Championship, Rd 22	(Brazil) Pietro Fantin	Dallara-Volkswagen F308
	Cooper Tires British F3 Championship, Rd 23	(Australia) Scott Pye	Dallara-Mercedes F308
	Cooper Tires British F3 Championship, Rd 24	(Denmark) Kevin Magnussen	Dallara-Volkswagen F308
2012	Cooper Tires British F3 Championship, Rd 9	(Malaysia) Jazeman Jaafar	Dallara-Volkswagen F312
	Cooper Tires British F3 Championship, Rd 10	(England) Harry Tincknell	Dallara-Volkswagen F312
	Cooper Tires British F3 Championship, Rd 11	(England) Jack Harvey	Dallara-Volkswagen F312
2014	Cooper Tires British F3 Championship, Rd 1 Race 1	(United Kingdom) Sam MacLeod	Dallara-Mercedes F312
	Cooper Tires British F3 Championship, Rd 1 Race 2	(United Kingdom) Sam MacLeod	Dallara-Mercedes F312
	Cooper Tires British F3 Championship, Rd 1 Race 3	(United Kingdom) Matt Rao	Dallara-Mercedes F312
2016	BRDC British F3 Championship Rd.7	(United Kingdom) Lando Norris	Tatuus-Cosworth F4-016
	BRDC British F3 Championship Rd.8	(Australia) Thomas Randle	Tatuus-Cosworth F4-016
	BRDC British F3 Championship Rd.9	(United Kingdom) Ricky Collard	Tatuus-Cosworth F4-016
2017	BRDC British F3 Championship Rd.4	(United Kingdom) Enaam Ahmed	Tatuus-Cosworth F4-016
	BRDC British F3 Championship Rd.5	(United States) Cameron Das	Tatuus-Cosworth F4-016
	BRDC British F3 Championship Rd.6	(United Kingdom) Ben Hingeley	Tatuus-Cosworth F4-016

=== British Touring Car Championship ===
Year	Race	Driver	Car
2003	Green Flag MSA British Touring Car Championship, Rd 9	(England) Matt Neal	Honda Civic Type-R
	Green Flag MSA British Touring Car Championship, Rd 10	(France) Yvan Muller	Vauxhall Astra Coupé
2007	Dunlop MSA British Touring Car Championship, Rd 4	(Italy) Fabrizio Giovanardi	Vauxhall Vectra
	Dunlop MSA British Touring Car Championship, Rd 5	(Italy) Fabrizio Giovanardi	Vauxhall Vectra
	Dunlop MSA British Touring Car Championship, Rd 6	(England) Jason Plato	SEAT León
2008	HiQ MSA British Touring Car Championship, Rd 4	(Scotland) Gordon Shedden	Honda Civic
	HiQ MSA British Touring Car Championship, Rd 5	(England) Mat Jackson	BMW 320si
	HiQ MSA British Touring Car Championship, Rd 6	(England) Matt Neal	Vauxhall Vectra
2009	HiQ MSA British Touring Car Championship, Rd 25	(England) Stephen Jelley	BMW 320si
	HiQ MSA British Touring Car Championship, Rd 26	(England) Jason Plato	Chevrolet Lacetti
	HiQ MSA British Touring Car Championship, Rd 27	(England) Stephen Jelley	BMW 320si
2010	Dunlop MSA British Touring Car Championship, Rd 4	(England) Matt Neal	Honda Civic
	Dunlop MSA British Touring Car Championship, Rd 5	(England) Jason Plato	Chevrolet Cruze
	Dunlop MSA British Touring Car Championship, Rd 6	(England) Matt Neal	Honda Civic
2011	Dunlop MSA British Touring Car Championship, Rd 22	(England) Jason Plato	Chevrolet Cruze LT
	Dunlop MSA British Touring Car Championship, Rd 23	(Scotland) Gordon Shedden	Honda Civic
	Dunlop MSA British Touring Car Championship, Rd 24	(England) James Nash	Vauxhall Vectra
2012	Dunlop MSA British Touring Car Championship, Rd 22	(England) Jason Plato	MG6 GT
	Dunlop MSA British Touring Car Championship, Rd 23	(Scotland) Gordon Shedden	Honda Civic
	Dunlop MSA British Touring Car Championship, Rd 24	(Scotland) Gordon Shedden	Honda Civic
2013	Dunlop MSA British Touring Car Championship, Rd 22	(England) Andrew Jordan	Honda Civic
	Dunlop MSA British Touring Car Championship, Rd 23	(England) Rob Austin	Audi A4
	Dunlop MSA British Touring Car Championship, Rd 24	(England) Andrew Jordan	Honda Civic
2014	Dunlop MSA British Touring Car Championship, Rd 22	(Northern Ireland) Colin Turkington	BMW 125i M Sport
	Dunlop MSA British Touring Car Championship, Rd 23	(Northern Ireland) Colin Turkington	BMW 125i M Sport
	Dunlop MSA British Touring Car Championship, Rd 24	(England) Rob Austin	Audi A4
2015	Dunlop MSA British Touring Car Championship, Rd 22	(England) Mat Jackson	Ford Focus ST
	Dunlop MSA British Touring Car Championship, Rd 23	(Scotland) Gordon Shedden	Honda Civic Type R
	Dunlop MSA British Touring Car Championship, Rd 24	(England) Jason Plato	Volkswagen CC
2016	Dunlop MSA British Touring Car Championship, Rd 22	(Scotland) Gordon Shedden	Honda Civic Type R
	Dunlop MSA British Touring Car Championship, Rd 23	(England) Sam Tordoff	BMW 125i M Sport
	Dunlop MSA British Touring Car Championship, Rd 24	(Republic of Ireland) Árón Smith	Volkswagen CC
2017	Dunlop MSA British Touring Car Championship, Rd 22	(England) James Cole	Subaru Levorg GT
	Dunlop MSA British Touring Car Championship, Rd 23	(England) Ashley Sutton	Subaru Levorg GT
	Dunlop MSA British Touring Car Championship, Rd 24	(England) Andrew Jordan	BMW 125i M Sport
2018	Dunlop MSA British Touring Car Championship, Rd 19	(England) Adam Morgan	Mercedes-Benz A-Class
	Dunlop MSA British Touring Car Championship, Rd 20	(England) Ashley Sutton	Subaru Levorg GT
	Dunlop MSA British Touring Car Championship, Rd 21	(Northern Ireland) Chris Smiley	Honda Civic Type R

=== British Superbike Championship ===
Year	Race	Rider	Manufacturer
2001	2001 British Superbike Championship Rd.23	(England) Sean Emmett	996cc Ducati 996
	2001 British Superbike Championship Rd.24	(England) Michael Rutter	750cc Kawasaki ZX-7RR
2002	2002 British Superbike Championship Rd.13	(England) Michael Rutter	996cc Ducati 996 RS
	2002 British Superbike Championship Rd.14	(England) Michael Rutter	996cc Ducati 996 RS
2003	2003 British Superbike Championship Rd.13 +	(Japan) Yukio Kagayama	999cc Suzuki GSX-R1000
	2003 British Superbike Championship Rd.14	(Japan) Yukio Kagayama	999cc Suzuki GSX-R1000

+ Qualification cancelled due to dangerous track conditions, grid decided by championship positions.

=== The Rockingham Stages ===
On 12 December 2004, the first Stage Rally, the Rockingham Stages, was held at the venue. This was jointly promoted by Middlesex County Automobile Club and Thame Motorsport Club. The two day event rapidly grew to be one of the favourite events on the British stage rally calendar. For several years it was a round of the MSN (Motor Sports News) Circuit Rally Championship. The 2018 Rockingham Stages was the last competitive motorsport event to be held at the Speedway.

Year	Overall winner	co-driver	Car
2004	John Stone	Lee Carter	MG Metro 6R4
2004	John Stone	Lee Carter	MG Metro 6R4
2005	Steve Simpson	Mark Booth	Hyundai Accent WRC
2006	Steve Simpson	Simon Hunter	Hyundai Accent WRC
2007	Steve Simpson	Simon Hunter	Hyundai Accent WRC
2008	Steve Simpson	Simon Hunter	Hyundai Accent WRC
2009	Steve Simpson	Simon Hunter	Hyundai Accent WRC
2010	Tony Racey	Paul Heath	Subaru Impreza
2011	Pete Rayner	Aron Rayner	Ford Escort Mk.II
2012	Paul King	Alicia Miles	Ford Escort RS
2013	Paul King	Fiona Scarrett	Ford Escort RS
2014	David Tinn	Marc Fowler	Proton Satria Neo Millington
2015	David Tinn	Giles Dykes	Proton Satria Neo Millington
2016	Rhys Yates	Tom Woodburn	Ford Fiesta R5
2017	William Hill	Richard Crozier	Ford Fiesta R5
2018	Paul King	Alicia Miles	Ford Escort RS

=== Oval racing ===
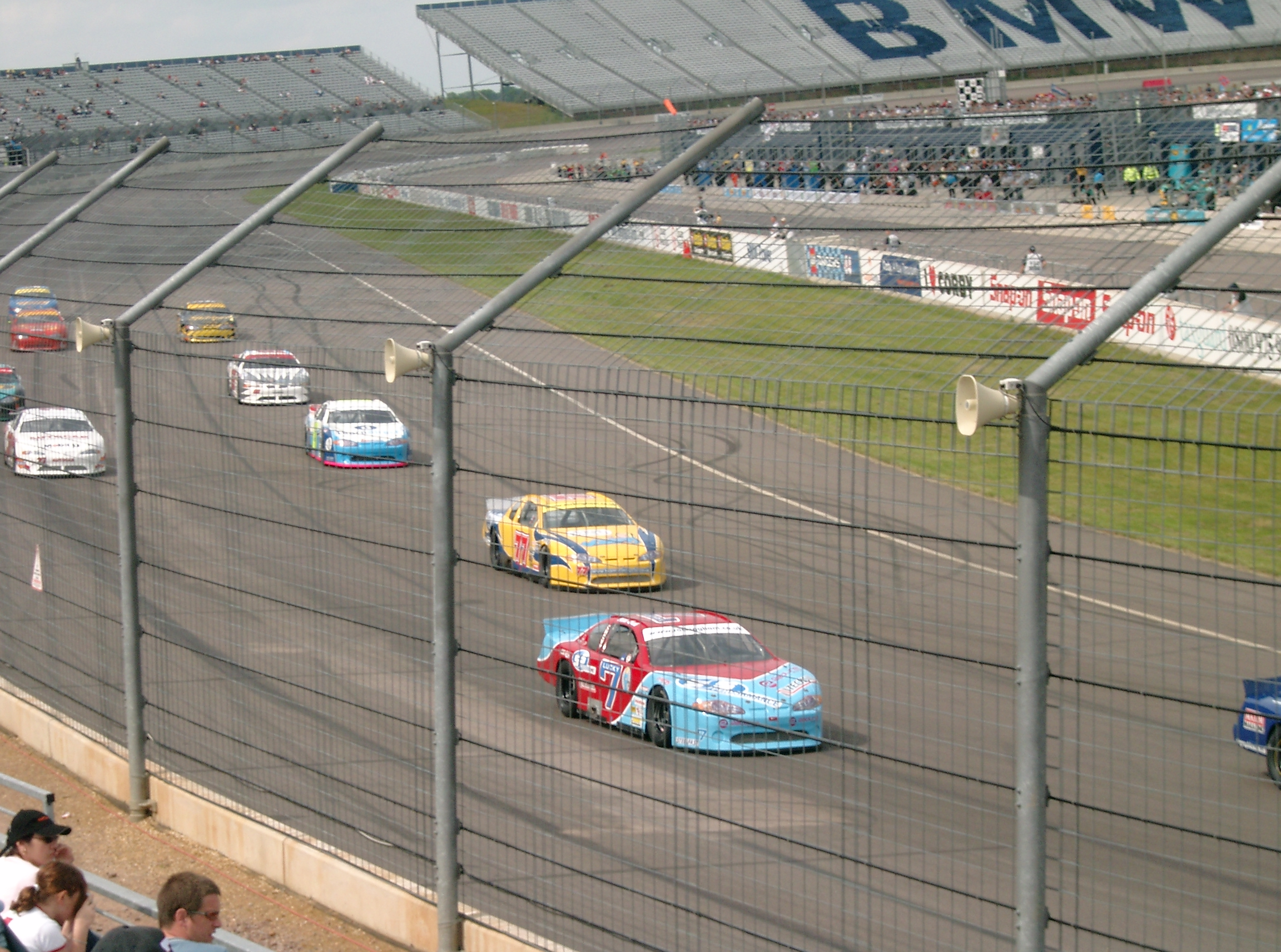
Days of Thunder race cars on a warmup lap for a race at Rockingham in 2004

From 2001 to the end of 2007, Rockingham organised and funded American-style Stockcar racing on the oval. Originally known as ASCAR, the series changed name to "Days of Thunder", and then to SCSA (Stock Car Speed Association), before re-branding to the MAC Tools V8 Trophy for its final season in 2007. All cars were UK variants of the American "ASA National-Tour" Howe Racing chassis, running with either Ford, Chevrolet or Pontiac bodies. A change of circuit ownership for 2006 saw the end of promotion and funding for the series, and low grids in 2007 led the organising club (BRSCC) to amalgamate it with a road course series, and eventually to the demise of both championships before the end of 2008.

== Other activities ==
The circuit was operational 356 days a year and the majority of events that took place at the venue were not motorsport competitions. Events ranged from manufacturer product launches to dealer training, track days and testing, and corporate and experience days.

The City Auction Group holds an auction weekly at the circuit.

The Learning Grid Rockingham Festival in the first week of July promotes science and engineering to school pupils.

The venue had a sizeable showground area which has hosted the following shows:

- The French Car Show
- The Site Equipment Demonstration (SED) Show
- Greenfleet
- The LCV Show
- Stobart Fest
- Japfest 2

== Media appearances ==
=== Television ===
- Fifth Gear
- Wheeler Dealers
- Saturday Night Takeaway
- The Grand Tour
- Top Gear
- Scrapheap Challenge

=== Magazines and newspapers ===
The Telegraph and Fiat held a track day at Rockingham in 2012 and published a number of articles featuring the circuit. Autosport's Caterham SP300R video review was made on the ISSC, and Car Magazine did a track test on the Nissan GT-R vs Porsche 911 Turbo in 2012 and a McLaren supercar group test in 2010. Car Dealer magazine reviewed the BMW M5 at Rockingham and compared it with a Mercedes E63 AMG, a Lexus ISF, a Porsche Panamera and an Infiniti M35h. The circuit also features on the Pistonheads website with videos showing the Caterham SP300 R and the new Astra VXR. Chris Harris on Cars showcased the BAC Mono.
