= Rockingham 500 =

Motor race held in Corby, England

Coordinates: 52.5150°N 0.6575°W

CART FedEx Championship Series
- Venue: Rockingham Motor Speedway
- Location: Corby, Northamptonshire, England, United Kingdom
- Corporate sponsor: Sure For Men (2002)
- First race: 2001
- Last race: 2002
- Previous names: Sure For Men Rockingham 500 (2002)
- Most wins (driver): Gil de Ferran (1); Dario Franchitti (1)
- Most wins (team): Team Penske (1); Team Green (1)
- Most wins (manufacturer): Reynard (1); Lola (1)

Circuit information
- Surface: Tarmac
- Length: 2.380 km (1.479 mi)
- Turns: 4
- Lap record: 25.217 (Jimmy Vasser, Lola-Ford, 2002)

The Rockingham 500 was an annual Championship Auto Racing Teams (CART) open-wheel race held in 2001 and 2002 at the Rockingham Motor Speedway, an oval track located in Corby, Northamptonshire, England, United Kingdom. The event was the first major motor race in the United Kingdom to be held on an oval track with Champ cars. It was created in the hope of competing with the Formula One British Grand Prix, but CART had difficulty publicising the event.

The first race, in 2001, was marred by drainage issues and won by Team Penske's Gil de Ferran. It was last held the following year, when the track was hampered by a poor trading environment and inclement weather. For 2003, the race was relocated to Brands Hatch in Kent and renamed the London Champ Car Trophy. The race helped Rockingham Motor Speedway establish itself on the global motorsport scene, and it introduced a new type of racing to the UK.

== History ==
During the construction of the Rockingham Motor Speedway in October 1999, former property developer Peter Davies revealed publicly a plan to hold a CART motor race there. In July 2000, it was announced that Rockingham would hold a race for the 2001 season. The event would be Europe's second, following the German 500 at the EuroSpeedway Lausitz in Klettwitz, Germany. The event would take place on a four-turn 1.479-mile (2.380 km) oval track that has banking of up to 7.9 degrees. The organisers signed a five-year contract with CART to hold the event. Champ Cars would race in Europe for the first time since 1978, and on a British oval track for the first time. Several observers questioned CART's chances of staging a race in England, noting that previous similar schemes were unsuccessful. It was started in the hope of competing with the British Grand Prix.

CART encountered difficulties in promoting the race early on. They were unable to adequately educate British motor racing fans about the series. The owners of Rockingham attempted to display an advertisement at the 2001 British Grand Prix, but the owner of Formula One's commercial rights, Bernie Ecclestone, cancelled the plan shortly before it was to take place. In response, a major marketing strategy was implemented. The Michaelides & Bednash agency oversaw the advertising, which began in the printed press in August and included two television commercials and an official poster. The event was hampered by drainage issues on the new track, which forced the cancellation of the practise sessions. The starting order was determined by the drivers' points standings. Its length was reduced from 210 to 140 laps due to a lack of practice and darkness, and Team Penske driver Gil de Ferran won after overtaking pole position starter Kenny Bräck of Team Rahal on the final lap. Most drivers praised the circuit but did not criticise the problems affecting it. Despite two days of practice and qualifying rounds being cancelled because of the drainage issues, 38,000 spectators attended the race. The track later had an extra layer added along with a sealant to allow it to drain water.

During the 2002 race preparations, it was announced that a provisional date for 2003 had been set at 4 May. The circuit's chief executive, David Grace, said it provided an opportunity to hold the event at the start of summer, giving motor racing fans "the ideal start" to the season. He noted that moving the dates did not increase the risk of inclement weather because meteorological data for the track showed that the months of May and September were the driest of the year. The 2002 event had improved weather but fewer attendees. Dario Franchitti of Team Green won the race. Dale Coyne Racing formed a "all-England" team called Team St. George with British American Racing Formula One test driver and ASCAR Days of Thunder series competitor Darren Manning in an attempt to promote the race. Some journalists speculated that the race might not be held because of the cancellation of the German 500 due to financial difficulties. Rockingham renegotiated its sanctioning fee from $4.2 million to $2.8 million, claiming that the German 500's had harmed the event's reputation.

Rockingham Motor Speedway CEO Ashley Power began talks with CART officials in November 2002, hoping to end the race's five-year contract early due to a poor trading environment and inclement weather. He also stated that Rockingham would lose money, contradicting a prediction made by its former chairman Peter Middleton in January. This was due in part to the track financing Team St. George, though Rockingham sold sponsorship to recoup some of its losses. On November 25, it was announced that Rockingham Motor Speedway would not hold its scheduled 2003 race, but CART and track personnel stated their intention to look into holding similar events in the future. It was revealed that the track lacked the resources and time to create a marketing programme and find a new title sponsor. The postponement until 2004 would allow them to meet those targets. According to Crash, the race established Rockingham in world motor sport and provided a new attraction for British motor racing enthusiasts. For 2003, it was moved to the Brands Hatch Indy circuit in Kent and renamed the London Champ Car Trophy.

== Race winners ==
Year	Date	Driver	Team	Chassis	Engine	Race Distance		Race Time	Average Speed (mph)	Report	Ref
Year	Date	Driver	Team	Chassis	Engine	Laps	Miles (km)	Race Time	Average Speed (mph)	Report	Ref
2001	22 September	Gil de Ferran (BRA)	Team Penske	Reynard	Honda	140*	207.06 (333.23)	1:20:59	153.408	Report	
2002	14 September	Dario Franchitti (GBR)	Team Green	Lola	Honda	211	312.069 (502.226)	1:58:44	157.682	Report	

- 2001: 210 laps were originally planned for the race. Due to a lack of practice, the race was shortened to 168 laps and was subsequently cut short because of darkness.
