= 901 (disambiguation) =

901 may refer to:

- 901 (year)
- 901 (number)
- Area code 901
- Porsche 901
- NGC 901
- Leyton House CG901
