= 1998 Honda Grand Prix of Monterey =

(United States) 1998 Laguna Seca
Race details
- Race 16 of 19 in the 1998 CART season
- Mazda Raceway Laguna Seca
- Date: September 13, 1998
- Official name: 1998 Honda Grand Prix of Monterey Featuring The Texaco Havoline 300
- Location: Mazda Raceway Laguna Seca; Monterey, California
- Course: Permanent road course 2.238 mi / 3.602 km
- Distance: 83 laps 185.754 mi / 298.966 km
- Weather: Dry

Pole position
- Driver: (United States) Bryan Herta (Team Rahal)
- Time: 1:08.146

Fastest lap
- Driver: (Brazil) Tony Kanaan (Tasman Motorsports Group)
- Time: 1:10.824 (on lap 51 of 83)

Podium
- First: (United States) Bryan Herta (Team Rahal)
- Second: (Italy) Alex Zanardi (Chip Ganassi Racing)
- Third: (Brazil) Tony Kanaan (Tasman Motorsports Group)

The 1998 Honda Grand Prix of Monterey Featuring The Texaco-Havoline 300 was the sixteenth round of the 1998 CART FedEx Champ Car World Series season, held on September 13, 1998, at the Mazda Raceway Laguna Seca in Monterey, California. Bryan Herta led the race from start to finish with the exception of pit stops, and held off Alex Zanardi at the end to take his first ever CART win.

== Classification ==
=== Race ===
Pos	No	Driver	Team	Laps	Time/Retired	Grid	Points
1	8	(United States) Bryan Herta	Team Rahal	83	1:55:13.472	1	20+1+1
2	1	(Italy) Alex Zanardi	Chip Ganassi Racing	83	+0.343	5	16
3	21	(Brazil) Tony Kanaan	Tasman Motorsports Group	83	+3.779	14	14
4	27	(United Kingdom) Dario Franchitti	Team Green	83	+4.402	2	12
5	12	(United States) Jimmy Vasser	Chip Ganassi Racing	83	+7.174	3	10
6	2	(United States) Al Unser Jr.	Team Penske	83	+7.863	7	8
7	40	(Mexico) Adrián Fernández	Patrick Racing	83	+9.129	6	6
8	26	(Canada) Paul Tracy	Team Green	83	+9.278	18	5
9	11	(Brazil) Christian Fittipaldi	Newman-Haas Racing	83	+9.666	13	4
10	6	(United States) Michael Andretti	Newman-Haas Racing	83	+10.193	12	3
11	10	(United States) Richie Hearn	Della Penna Motorsports	83	+10.881	17	2
12	25	(Italy) Max Papis	Arciero-Wells Racing	83	+11.649	16	1
13	24	(United States) Robby Gordon	Arciero-Wells Racing	83	+12.024	24	
14	3	(Brazil) André Ribeiro	Team Penske	83	+12.571	22	
15	77	(West Germany) Arnd Meier	Davis Racing	82	+1 Lap	26	
16	7	(United States) Bobby Rahal	Team Rahal	80	+3 Laps	19	
17	33	(Canada) Patrick Carpentier	Forsythe Racing	76	Contact	20	
18	20	(United States) Scott Pruett	Patrick Racing	76	Contact	8	
19	5	(Brazil) Gil de Ferran	Walker Racing	76	Contact	10	
20	36	(United States) Alex Barron	All American Racing	71	Contact	23	
21	99	(Canada) Greg Moore	Forsythe Racing	70	Off course	4	
22	16	(Brazil) Hélio Castro-Neves	Bettenhausen Racing	70	Contact	21	
23	98	(Italy) Vincenzo Sospiri	All American Racing	64	Brakes	27	
24	19	(Mexico) Michel Jourdain Jr.	Payton/Coyne Racing	39	Engine	25	
25	18	(United Kingdom) Mark Blundell	PacWest Racing Group	31	Throttle	15	
26	34	(United States) Dennis Vitolo	Payton/Coyne Racing	20	Spun off	28	
27	17	(Brazil) Maurício Gugelmin	PacWest Racing Group	13	Cooling	9	
28	9	(Finland) JJ Lehto	Hogan Racing	1	Suspension	11	

== Caution flags ==
Laps	Cause
22-24	Vitolo (34) spin
68-76	Sospiri (98) spin, Moore (99) off course, Barron (36), Castro-Neves (16) contact
78-81	Carpentier (33), Pruett (20), de Ferran (5) contact

== Lap Leaders ==
Laps	Leader
1-51	Bryan Herta
52-53	Dario Franchitti
54-83	Bryan Herta

Driver	Laps led
Bryan Herta	81
Dario Franchitti	2

== Point standings after race ==
Pos	Driver	Points
1	(Italy) Alex Zanardi	234
2	(United States) Jimmy Vasser	136
3	(Mexico) Adrián Fernández	126
4	(United Kingdom) Dario Franchitti	122
5	(Canada) Greg Moore	119
