= 1998 Texaco/Havoline 200 =

(United States) 1998 Road America
Race details
- Race 14 of 19 in the 1998 CART season
- Road America
- Date: August 16, 1998
- Official name: 1998 Texaco/Havoline 200
- Location: Road America; Elkhart Lake, Wisconsin
- Course: Permanent road course 4.048 mi / 6.515 km
- Distance: 50 laps 202.4 mi / 325.75 km
- Weather: Temperatures reaching up to 73.4 °F (23.0 °C); wind speeds up to 12 miles per hour (19 km/h)

Pole position
- Driver: (United States) Michael Andretti (Newman-Haas Racing)
- Time: 1:39.988

Fastest lap
- Driver: (Italy) Alex Zanardi (Chip Ganassi Racing)
- Time: 1:41.874 (on lap 49 of 50)

Podium
- First: (United Kingdom) Dario Franchitti (Team KOOL Green)
- Second: (Italy) Alex Zanardi (Chip Ganassi Racing)
- Third: (Brazil) Christian Fittipaldi (Newman-Haas Racing)

The 1998 Texaco/Havoline 200 was the fourteenth round of the 1998 CART FedEx Champ Car World Series season, held on August 16, 1998, at Road America in Elkhart Lake, Wisconsin. Dario Franchitti won the race, his first career win in CART. The race was also notable for a crash in which Alex Barron ended up on top of Bryan Herta.

== Classification ==
=== Race ===
Pos	No	Driver	Team	Laps	Time/Retired	Grid	Points
1	27	(United Kingdom) Dario Franchitti	Team Green	50	1:35:30.767	6	20+1
2	1	(Italy) Alex Zanardi	Chip Ganassi Racing	50	+7.102	11	16
3	11	(Brazil) Christian Fittipaldi	Newman-Haas Racing	50	+43.922	7	14
4	21	(Brazil) Tony Kanaan	Tasman Motorsports Group	50	+46.134	12	12
5	40	(Mexico) Adrián Fernández	Patrick Racing	50	+47.097	9	10
6	26	(Canada) Paul Tracy	Team Green	50	+52.003	17	8
7	18	(United Kingdom) Mark Blundell	PacWest Racing Group	50	+52.167	15	6
8	7	(United States) Bobby Rahal	Team Rahal	50	+1:06.372	3	5
9	12	(United States) Jimmy Vasser	Chip Ganassi Racing	50	+1:07.084	14	4
10	77	(West Germany) Arnd Meier	Davis Racing	50	+1:07.598	27	3
11	25	(Italy) Max Papis	Arciero-Wells Racing	50	+1:14.329	19	2
12	24	(United States) Robby Gordon	Arciero-Wells Racing	50	+1:15.697	23	1
13	10	(United States) Richie Hearn	Della Penna Motorsports	50	+1:19.336	25	
14	19	(Mexico) Michel Jourdain Jr.	Payton/Coyne Racing	50	+1:38.024	24	
15	6	(United States) Michael Andretti	Newman-Haas Racing	49	Tyre/Contact	1	1
16	5	(Brazil) Gil de Ferran	Walker Racing	43	Engine	5	
17	34	(Brazil) Gualter Salles	Payton/Coyne Racing	41	Engine	20	
18	9	(Finland) JJ Lehto	Hogan Racing	32	Exhaust	18	
19	17	(Brazil) Maurício Gugelmin	PacWest Racing Group	29	Brakes	21	
20	20	(United States) Scott Pruett	Patrick Racing	24	Engine	4	
21	99	(Canada) Greg Moore	Forsythe Racing	18	Transmission	8	
22	98	(United States) P. J. Jones	All American Racing	14	Spun off	28	
23	8	(United States) Bryan Herta	Team Rahal	10	Contact	2	
24	36	(United States) Alex Barron	All American Racing	10	Contact	26	
25	3	(Brazil) André Ribeiro	Team Penske	7	Engine	13	
26	16	(Brazil) Hélio Castro-Neves	Bettenhausen Racing	2	Header	22	
27	2	(United States) Al Unser Jr.	Team Penske	0	Contact	10	
28	33	(Canada) Patrick Carpentier	Forsythe Racing	0	Contact	16	

== Caution flags ==
Laps	Cause
10	Ribeiro (3) stalled on course
12-14	Herta (8), Barron (36) contact

== Lap Leaders ==
Laps	Leader
1-9	Michael Andretti
10	Bryan Herta
11-16	Greg Moore
17-25	Michael Andretti
26-27	Dario Franchitti
28	JJ Lehto
29	Bobby Rahal
30-50	Dario Franchitti

Driver	Laps led
Dario Franchitti	23
Michael Andretti	18
Greg Moore	6
Bobby Rahal	1
JJ Lehto	1
Bryan Herta	1

== Point standings after race ==
Pos	Driver	Points
1	(Italy) Alex Zanardi	206
2	(United States) Jimmy Vasser	126
3	(Mexico) Adrián Fernández	120
4	(Canada) Greg Moore	119
5	(United States) Michael Andretti	93
