= 1998 Molson Indy Toronto =

1998 CART Fed/Ex Champ Car World Series race held at Toronto, Ontario, Canada

(Canada) 1998 Toronto
Race details
- Race 11 of 19 in the 1998 CART season
- Exhibition Place track layout
- Date: July 19, 1998
- Official name: 1998 Molson Indy Toronto
- Location: Exhibition Place; Toronto, Ontario, Canada
- Course: Temporary street course 1.755 mi / 2.824 km
- Distance: 95 laps 166.725 mi / 268.28 km
- Weather: Temperatures reaching up to 25 °C (77 °F); wind speeds up to 14 kilometres per hour (8.7 mph)

Pole position
- Driver: (United Kingdom) Dario Franchitti (Team KOOL Green)
- Time: 58.694

Fastest lap
- Driver: (Brazil) Christian Fittipaldi (Newman/Haas Racing)
- Time: 59.924 (on lap 75 of 95)

Podium
- First: (Italy) Alex Zanardi (Chip Ganassi Racing)
- Second: (United States) Michael Andretti (Newman/Haas Racing)
- Third: (United States) Jimmy Vasser (Chip Ganassi Racing)

The 1998 Molson Indy Toronto was the eleventh round of the 1998 CART FedEx Champ Car World Series season, held on July 19, 1998, on the streets of Exhibition Place in Toronto, Ontario, Canada. Alex Zanardi passed Michael Andretti with three laps to go to win the race, after Andretti had inherited the lead when pole-sitter Dario Franchitti retired due to a brake failure.

== Starting grid ==
1. Dario Franchitti (second straight pole in Toronto)
2. Alex Zanardi
3. Michael Andretti
4. Gil de Ferran
5. Christian Fittipaldi
6. Jimmy Vasser
7. Tony Kanaan (R)
8. Scott Pruett
9. Bobby Rahal
10. Paul Tracy
11. André Ribeiro
12. Greg Moore
13. Richie Hearn
14. Al Unser Jr.
15. Mark Blundell
16. Adrian Fernandez
17. Bryan Herta
18. Patrick Carpentier
19. Maurício Gugelmin
20. Max Papis
21. Hélio Castroneves (R)
22. Robby Gordon
23. P. J. Jones
24. Michel Jourdain Jr.
25. Arnd Meier
26. JJ Lehto (R)
27. Alex Barron (R)
28. Gualter Salles

== Race ==
=== Lap 17 ===
Richie Hearn locked up the right front tire and spun on turn 1. Top 6 was composed by: Dario Franchitti, Alex Zanardi, Michael Andretti, Gil de Ferran, Jimmy Vasser and Paul Tracy.

=== Lap 26 ===
First full course caution. Michel Jourdain Jr. and Alex Barron collided at the hairpin. Arnd Meier stalled the car metres in front and started a jampack. Meanwhile, Gil de Ferran retired after an incident in the pits. Christian Fittipaldi had problems, also, but did not retire.

=== Lap 27 ===
Top 6: Dario Franchitti, Michael Andretti, Jimmy Vasser, Paul Tracy, Alex Zanardi and Tony Kanaan.

=== Lap 30 ===
Before going green, Patrick Carpentier collided with Mark Blundell on turn 9.

=== Lap 32 ===
Second full course caution, as Blundell's car stalled on turn 9, following the collision with Carpentier. On lap 36, green flag came out.

=== Lap 38 ===
JJ Lehto had a big crash. Third full course caution. Green flag came out some laps later.

=== Lap 52 ===
Top 6: Dario Franchitti, Michael Andretti, Jimmy Vasser, Alex Zanardi, Tony Kanaan and Paul Tracy.

=== Lap 61 ===
Tony Kanaan had a pit fire. Meanwhile, in the hairpin, Alex Zanardi had a collision with his teammate Jimmy Vasser.

=== Lap 68 ===
Gualter Salles had a collision at the hairpin with Al Unser Jr. and went airborne.

=== 16 laps to go ===
Dario Franchitti spun and stalled, ending his day. Paul Tracy slightly t-boned him. Fourth full course caution was out. Green flag came out with 11 laps to go.

=== 8 laps to go ===
Top 6: Michael Andretti, Alex Zanardi, Jimmy Vasser, Bobby Rahal, Bryan Herta and Scott Pruett.

=== 5 laps to go ===
Paul Tracy and Adrian Fernandez collided on turn 1 while they were battling for 9th place.

=== 3 laps to go ===
Alex Zanardi overtakes Michael Andretti at the hairpin.

== Classification ==
=== Race ===
Pos	No	Driver	Team	Laps	Time/Retired	Grid	Points
1	1	(Italy) Alex Zanardi	Chip Ganassi Racing	95	1:52:24.080	2	20
2	6	(United States) Michael Andretti	Newman-Haas Racing	95	+1.921	3	16
3	12	(United States) Jimmy Vasser	Chip Ganassi Racing	95	+6.702	6	14
4	7	(United States) Bobby Rahal	Team Rahal	95	+8.078	9	12
5	8	(United States) Bryan Herta	Team Rahal	95	+12.984	17	10
6	20	(United States) Scott Pruett	Patrick Racing	95	+14.607	8	8
7	10	(United States) Richie Hearn	Della Penna Motorsports	95	+15.305	13	6
8	25	(Italy) Max Papis	Arciero-Wells Racing	95	+24.676	20	5
9	40	(Mexico) Adrián Fernández	Patrick Racing	95	+31.923	16	4
10	16	(Brazil) Hélio Castro-Neves	Bettenhausen Racing	95	+32.691	21	3
11	99	(Canada) Greg Moore	Forsythe Racing	95	+34.926	12	2
12	17	(Brazil) Maurício Gugelmin	PacWest Racing Group	95	+37.640	19	1
13	24	(United States) Robby Gordon	Arciero-Wells Racing	94	+1 Lap	22	
14	26	(Canada) Paul Tracy	Team Green	94	+1 Lap	10	
15	77	(West Germany) Arnd Meier	Davis Racing	94	+1 Lap	25	
16	11	(Brazil) Christian Fittipaldi	Newman-Haas Racing	93	+2 Laps	5	
17	2	(United States) Al Unser Jr.	Team Penske	93	+2 Laps	14	
18	19	(Mexico) Michel Jourdain Jr.	Payton/Coyne Racing	93	+2 Laps	24	
19	98	(United States) P. J. Jones	All American Racing	84	Suspension	23	
20	27	(United Kingdom) Dario Franchitti	Team Green	79	Brakes	1	1+1
21	34	(Brazil) Gualter Salles	Payton/Coyne Racing	65	Contact	28	
22	21	(Brazil) Tony Kanaan	Tasman Motorsports Group	61	Fire	7	
23	3	(Brazil) André Ribeiro	Team Penske	54	Transmission	11	
24	9	(Finland) JJ Lehto	Hogan Racing	37	Contact	26	
25	33	(Canada) Patrick Carpentier	Forsythe Racing	33	Suspension	18	
26	18	(United Kingdom) Mark Blundell	PacWest Racing Group	30	Electrical	15	
27	5	(Brazil) Gil de Ferran	Walker Racing	26	Contact	4	
28	36	(United States) Alex Barron	All American Racing	25	Contact	27	

== Caution flags ==
Laps	Cause
25-29	Multi-car contact at hairpin
33-34	Blundell (18) stopped on track
40-43	Lehto (9) contact
79-83	Franchitti (27) contact, Tracy (26) stall

== Lap leaders ==
Laps	Leader
1-65	Dario Franchitti
66	Bobby Rahal
67	Bryan Herta
68	Christian Fittipaldi
69-79	Dario Franchitti
80-92	Michael Andretti
93-95	Alex Zanardi

Driver	Laps led
Dario Franchitti	76
Michael Andretti	13
Alex Zanardi	3
Bobby Rahal	1
Bryan Herta	1
Christian Fittipaldi	1

== Point standings after race ==
Pos	Driver	Points
1	(Italy) Alex Zanardi	175
2	(United States) Jimmy Vasser	106
3	(Canada) Greg Moore	99
4	(Mexico) Adrián Fernández	89
5	(United States) Michael Andretti	84

== Broadcasting ==
=== Television ===
==== United States ====
The Molson Indy Torento was carried live flag-to-flag coverage in the United States on ABC. Bob Varsha and Danny Sullivan called the race from the broadcast booth. Jack Arute and Gary Gerould handled pit road for the television side.

ABC
Booth announcers		Pit reporters
Lap-by-lap	Color-commentators	Pit reporters
Bob Varsha	Danny Sullivan	Jack Arute; Gary Gerould

==== Canada ====
The Molson Indy Torento was carried live flag-to-flag coverage in Canada on CBC. Brian Williams and Bobby Unser called the race from the broadcast booth. Jon Beekhuis and Greg Creamer handled pit road for the television side.

CBC
Booth announcers		Pit reporters
Lap-by-lap	Color-commentators	Pit reporters
Brian Williams	Bobby Unser	Jon Beekhuis; Greg Creamer
