= Forsythe Championship Racing =

American auto racing team

(United States) Forsythe Championship Racing
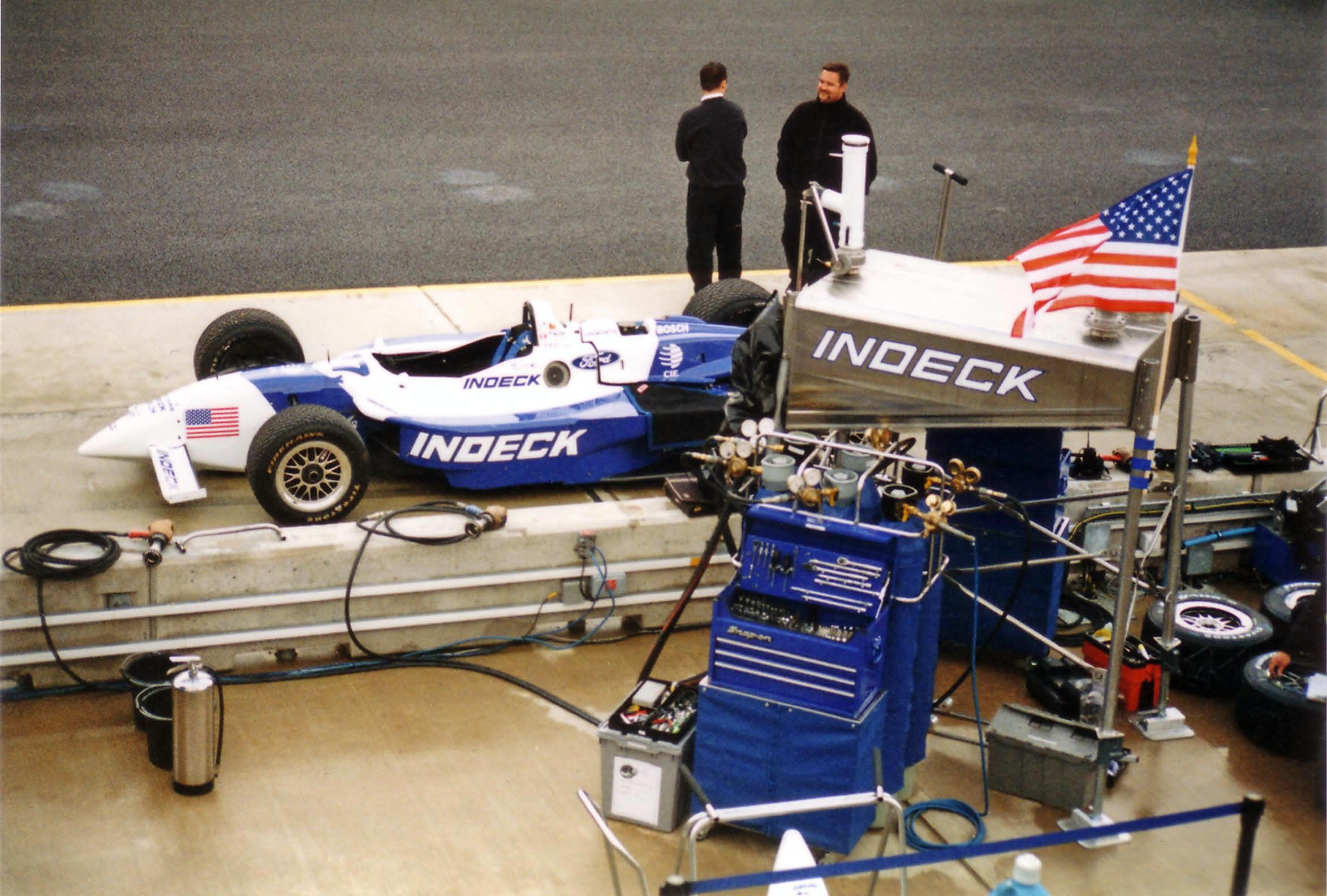
- Founded: 1982
- Folded: 2008
- Team principal(s): Gerald Forsythe
- Former series: Champ Car World Series; Indy Lights; Champ Car Atlantic Championship
- Noted drivers: (United States) Danny Sullivan (United States) Al Unser Jr. (Italy) Teo Fabi (Canada) Jacques Villeneuve (Canada) Greg Moore (Brazil) Tony Kanaan (Canada) Patrick Carpentier (Canada) Alex Tagliani (United States) Bryan Herta (Canada) Paul Tracy (United States) A. J. Allmendinger
- Drivers' Championships: Champ Car World Series: 2003: (Canada) Paul Tracy; Indy Lights: 1995: (Canada) Greg Moore; 1996: (Canada) David Empringham; Atlantic Championship: 1998: (Canada) Lee Bentham

Forsythe Championship Racing was an American racing team that competed in the Champ Car World Series owned by Gerald Forsythe. The Champ Car effort ceased operations after the 2008 unification of North American open wheel racing. The team won the 2003 championship with driver Paul Tracy.

== History ==
=== 1981–1985 ===
Forsythe Racing began sponsoring Lee Brayton's entry for his son Scott in 1981. Forsythe later started his own team, racing in CART part-time in 1982 with Héctor Rebaque and Danny Sullivan who drove for the team in the 1982 Indianapolis 500 and finished 13th and 14th, respectively. Later that season Rebaque won at Road America. Before Indy, Sullivan finished third at Atlanta Motor Speedway. Also that season Al Unser Jr. made his CART debut for the team at Riverside International Raceway and finished fifth. Moderate success continued from 1983 to 1985, most notably with rookie driver Teo Fabi who won four races in 1983, and started on the pole position at Indianapolis.

=== 1994–1997 ===
The team returned in 1994 as Forsythe-Green Racing with co-owner Barry Green, but by the next year the two had split and Green took their driver Jacques Villeneuve and Canadian cigarette sponsor Player's LTD to his new Team Green and won the 1995 Indianapolis 500 and CART championship. Forsythe reunited with Teo Fabi in a full-time effort in 1995 with Combustion Engineering sponsoring their team. Forsythe did keep sponsor Player's LTD for his Indy Lights team and Canadian Greg Moore brought home the 1995 Indy Lights championship for Forsythe. Moore tested a Champ Car for Team Penske late in 1995 so Forsythe quickly signed Moore to run their single 1996 Champ Car entry with Player's moving back from the Team Green squad as Villeneuve who was contracted to race for them for 1996 had his contracted brought out by Williams to race in Formula One that year. Moore would drive with Forsythe for the five seasons in total, one in Indy Lights where he would win 10 of 12 races, and four in Champ Car until his death at the end of the 1999 season. In Champ Car, Moore would capture five wins and place a best of fifth in the 1998 points standings, all with Forsythe Racing.

=== 1998–2008 ===
In 1998, the team expanded to two cars by adding Patrick Carpentier to the all-Canadian squad. Carpentier would drive for Forsythe through 2004 when he was hired by Cheever Racing of the rival Indy Racing League for 2005. Patrick captured five wins with the team. For 2000, Forsythe tabbed rookie Alex Tagliani to drive alongside Carpentier. In three seasons, Tagliani scored three poles and five podiums but no wins, so Alex was replaced by veteran Paul Tracy for the 2003 season. Tracy would win seven races on his way to bringing Forsythe its first CART championship in CART's final year of operations. In 2006, Mario Domínguez, who had replaced Carpentier, was fired mid-season and Forsythe brought in displaced American A. J. Allmendinger. Allmendinger proceeded to win his first three races with the team, his first Champ Car victories. Allmendinger was teammates with Paul Tracy who finished fourth in points in 2004 and 2005 after his championship-winning season. However, Allmendinger and the team were not able to come to terms for 2007 and Allmendinger announced he would be going to NASCAR Nextel Cup with Team Red Bull. Forsythe would later announce Dominguez's return to his team on March 30. Dominguez, however, was replaced by Oriol Servià on a race by race basis until Servia was hired full-time. For the 2008 season, Jerry Forsythe and former RuSPORT owner Dan Pettit, were to merge their teams into Forsythe/Pettit Racing to field at least two cars. However, changes brought about the unification of open wheel racing into the IndyCar Series. This made competitive racing financially unviable in the eyes of Forsythe and he elected not to race in the IndyCar Series in 2008. The team's Atlantic operation, Forsythe Racing continued to contest that series through the end of the 2008 season and the team fielded three of the team's Panoz DP01 chassis in the 2008 Toyota Grand Prix of Long Beach.

On July 15, 2008 Forsythe Racing announced that they would return to the Firestone Indy Lights Series grid in 2009. According to additional reports, Forsythe Racing were close to finalizing IRL IndyCar Series and American Le Mans Series programs for 2009, according to team manager Ken Swieck. Swieck confirmed that Forsythe intended to compete in both series rather than choosing one or the other. However, Forsythe never fielded any entries in either series.

== Statistics ==
The Forsythe team and its derivatives have amassed 34 CART and Champ Car victories and single championship in 2003 with Canadian Paul Tracy.

== Drivers who competed for Forsythe ==
- (United States) A. J. Allmendinger (2006)
- (Canada) Patrick Carpentier (1998–2004)
- (United States) Kevin Cogan (1984)
- (Mexico) Mario Domínguez (2005–2007)
- (Italy) Corrado Fabi (1984)
- (Italy) Teo Fabi (1983–1984, 1995)
- (Mexico) Memo Gidley (2000)
- (United States) Bryan Herta (2000–2001)
- (United States) Howdy Holmes (1985)
- (Brazil) Tony Kanaan (1999)
- (Mexico) Rodolfo Lavin (2004)
- (Mexico) David Martínez (2006–2008)
- (France) Franck Montagny (2008)
- (Canada) Greg Moore (1996–1999)
- (Netherlands) Jan Lammers (1985)
- (United States) John Paul Jr. (1985)
- (Mexico) Héctor Rebaque (1982)
- (United States) Buddy Rice (2006)
- (Spain) Oriol Servià (2007)
- (United States) Danny Sullivan (1982)
- (Canada) Alex Tagliani (2000–2002)
- (Canada) Paul Tracy (2003–2008)
- (United States) Al Unser Jr. (1982)
- (Canada) Jacques Villeneuve (1994)
- (Canada) Lee Bentham (1997-1999)

== Racing results ==
=== Complete CART / Champ Car World Series results ===
(key) (results in bold indicate pole position) (results in italics indicate fastest lap)

Year	Chassis	Engine	Tyres	Drivers	No.	1	2	3	4	5	6	7	8	9	10	11	12	13	14	15	16	17	18	19	20	21	Pts Pos	Pts
1982						PHX	ATL	MIL	CLE	MCH	MIL	POC	RIV	ROA	MCH	PHX												
1982	March 82C	Cosworth DFX V8t	G	(Mexico) Héctor Rebaque	32		13	DNS	18	25	DNP		20	1													15th	48
1982	March 82C	Cosworth DFX V8t	G	(United States) Danny Sullivan	33		3	21																			22nd	28
1982	March 82C	Cosworth DFX V8t	G	(United States) Al Unser Jr.	33								5														21st	30
1983						ATL	INDY	MIL	CLE	MCH	ROA	POC	RIV	MDO	MCH	CPL	LAG	PHX										
1983	March 83C	Cosworth DFX V8t	G	(Italy) Teo Fabi	33	20	**26**	**4**	3	**15**	15	1*	**2**	1*	3	25	**1***	**1***									**2nd**	146
1984						LBH	PHX	INDY	MIL	POR	MEA	CLE	MCH	ROA	POC	MDO	SAN	MCH	PHX	LAG	CPL							
1984	March 84C	Cosworth DFX V8t	G	(Italy) Teo Fabi	33	Ret	Ret	Ret	12	3	Ret	13															25th	15
1984	March 84C	Cosworth DFX V8t	G	(United States) Kevin Cogan	33								8	10	DNQ												24th	17
1984	Lola T800	Cosworth DFX V8t	G	(Italy) Corrado Fabi	33											Ret	10		6		Ret						28th	11
1984	Lola T800	Cosworth DFX V8t	G	(United Kingdom) Kenneth Acheson	33															DNQ							40th	0
1985						LBH	INDY	MIL	POR	MEA	CLE	MCH	ROA	POC	MDO	SAN	MCH	LAG	PHX	MIA								
1985	Lola T900	Cosworth DFX V8t	G	(Netherlands) Jan Lammers	32													5	20								26th	11
1985	Lola T900	Cosworth DFX V8t	G	(Netherlands) Jan Lammers	33															13							26th	11
1985	Lola T900	Cosworth DFX V8t	G	(United States) Howdy Holmes	33	14	10	11	17	13	22	9	10	21	16	21	18	DNS									25th	12
1995						MIA	SFR	PHX	LBH	NAZ	INDY	MIL	DET	POR	ROA	TOR	CLE	MCH	MDO	NHA	VAN	LAG						
1995	Reynard 95i	Ford XB V8t	G	(Italy) Teo Fabi	33	16	13	7	3	7	8	**4**	7	23	9	4	19	4	17	12	19	9					9th	83
1996						MIA	RIO	SFR	LBH	NAZ	500	MIL	DET	POR	CLE	TOR	MCH	MDO	ROA	VAN	LAG							
1996	Reynard 96i	Mercedes-Benz IC108C V8t	F	(Canada) Greg Moore	99	7	18	3	22	2	13	5	20	25	3	4	17	9	23	25	6						9th	84
1997						MIA	SFR	LBH	NAZ	RIO	GAT	MIL	DET	POR	CLE	TOR	MCH	MDO	ROA	VAN	LAG	FON						
1997	Reynard 97i	Mercedes-Benz IC108D V8t	F	(Canada) Greg Moore	99	4	2	23	16	2	13	1*	1	5	24	23	27	2	18	17	24	13					7th	111
1998						MIA	MOT	LBH	NAZ	RIO	GAT	MIL	DET	POR	CLE	TOR	MCH	MDO	ROA	VAN	LAG	HOU	SFR	FON				
1998	Reynard 98i	Mercedes-Benz IC108E V8t	F	(Canada) Patrick Carpentier	33	11	19	28	**13**	17	15	**25**	15	9	9	25	8	7	28	27	17	22	9	26			19th	27
1998	Reynard 98i	Mercedes-Benz IC108E V8t	F	(Canada) Greg Moore	99	**2**	4	6	3	1	**3**	13	**5**	27	25	11	1	22	21	20	21	**26**	8	2			5th	141
1999						MIA	MOT	LBH	NAZ	RIO	GAT	MIL	POR	CLE	ROA	TOR	MCH	DET	MDO	CHI	VAN	LAG	HOU	SRF	FON			
1999	Reynard 99i	Mercedes-Benz IC108E V8t	F	(Canada) Patrick Carpentier	33	7	26	17	14	6	22	9	9	7	22	11	10	23		6	2	9	19	24	25		13th	61
1999	Reynard 99i	Mercedes-Benz IC108E V8t	F	(Canada) Greg Moore	99	**1***	4	8	12	8	6	2	13	18	4	20	23	3	11	26	20	23	16	17	26		10th	97
1999	Reynard 99i	Honda HRS V8t	F	(Brazil) Tony Kanaan	44	21	6	**22***	23	5	7	18	15	22	6	17	1	6	23	11	9	21	9	6	8		11th	85
2000						MIA	LBH	RIO	MOT	NAZ	MIL	DET	POR	CLE	TOR	MCH	CHI	MDO	ROA	VAN	LAG	GAT	HOU	SRF	FON			
2000	Reynard 2Ki	Ford XF V8t	F	(Canada) Patrick Carpentier	32	5				21	3	5	10	5	7	4	14	7	21	24	9	2	19	5	14		11th	101
2000	Reynard 2Ki	Ford XF V8t	F	(United States) Memo Gidley	32		21	8	18																		20th	20
2000	Reynard 2Ki	Ford XF V8t	F	(Canada) Alex Tagliani	33	9	4	**13***	15	19	22	6	13	16	5	16	9	9	14*	18	23	14	16	22	6		16th	53
2000	Reynard 2Ki	Ford XF V8t	F	(United States) Bryan Herta	77																4						18th	26
2001						MTY	LBH	TXS	NAZ	MOT	MIL	DET	POR	CLE	TOR	MCH	CHI	MDO	ROA	VAN	LAU	ROC	HOU	LAG	SRF	FON		
2001	Reynard 01i	Ford XF V8t	F	(Canada) Patrick Carpentier	32	25	23	C^{1}	25	19	17	8	5	26	21	1	2	3	9	16	3	16	10	26	11	10	10th	91
2001	Reynard 01i	Ford XF V8t	F	(Canada) Alex Tagliani	33	21	18	C^{1}	22	22	12	21	12	9	2	6	6	7	8	**23***	21	14	19	15	3	**3**	11th	80
2001	Reynard 01i	Ford XF V8t	F	(United States) Bryan Herta	77	16	10	C^{1}	21	21	22	15	14	3	18	5	21	25	24	17	27	15	13	12	18	25	22nd	28
2002						MTY	LBH	MOT	MIL	LAG	POR	CHI	TOR	CLE	VAN	MDO	ROA	MTL	DEN	ROC	MIA	SFR	FON	MXC				
2002	Reynard 02i	Ford XF V8t	B	(Canada) Patrick Carpentier	32	7	19	4	15	5	5	16	10	1*	5	**1***	7	15	17	3	16	2	3	4			**3rd**	157
2002	Reynard 02i	Ford XF V8t	B	(Canada) Alex Tagliani	33	5	16	2	19	10	12	7	7	5	7	7	2	11	12	18	4	6	8	10			8th	111
2003						STP	MTY	LBH	BRH	LAU	MIL	LAG	POR	CLE	TOR	VAN	ROA	MDO	MTL	DEN	MIA	MXC	SFR					
2003	Lola B02/00	Ford XFE V8t	B	(Canada) Paul Tracy	3	1*	1*	1	**17**	12	12	3	**2***	2*	**1***	**1***	15	**1***	6	4	16	**1***	13				**1st**	226
2003	Lola B02/00	Ford XFE V8t	B	(Canada) Patrick Carpentier	32	8	8	6	5	7	3	**1***	16	4	7	13	5	2	3	17	6	14	5				5th	146
2004						LBH	MTY	MIL	POR	CLE	TOR	VAN	ROA	DEN	MTL	LAG	LSV	SFR	MXC									
2004	Lola B02/00	Ford XFE V8t	B	(Canada) Paul Tracy	1	1*	7	17	3	**17**	5	**1***	12	2*	4	10	18	**4***	10								4th	254
2004	Lola B02/00	Ford XFE V8t	B	(Mexico) Rodolfo Lavín	3	10	13	9	18	9	14	15	2	11	11	12	4	15	13								14th	156
2004	Lola B02/00	Ford XFE V8t	B	(Canada) Patrick Carpentier	7	4	4	2	4	16	3	16	14	9	2	1*	**3**	16	6								**3rd**	266
2005						LBH	MTY	MIL	POR	CLE	TOR	EDM	SJO	DEN	MTL	LSV	SRF	MXC										
2005	Lola B02/00	Ford XFE V8t	B	(Canada) Paul Tracy	3	**2**	15	1*	3	**1***	16	3	2	**16***	8	17*	17	3									4th	246
2005	Lola B02/00	Ford XFE V8t	B	(Mexico) Mario Domínguez	7	5	13	7	4	17	13	5	5	2	10	4	18	12									9th	198
2006						LBH	HOU	MTY	MIL	POR	CLE	TOR	EDM	SJO	DEN	MTL	ROA	SRF	MXC									
2006	Lola B02/00	Ford XFE V8t	B	(Canada) Paul Tracy	3	17	2	4	16	7	16	2	5	15	6	2	10	4									7th	209
2006	Lola B02/00	Ford XFE V8t	B	(Mexico) David Martínez	3														9								22nd	13
2006	Lola B02/00	Ford XFE V8t	B	(Mexico) Mario Domínguez	7	4	**3***	6	14																		9th	202
2006	Lola B02/00	Ford XFE V8t	B	(United States) A. J. Allmendinger	7					1*	**1***	1*	3	7	1*	17	1	16									**3rd**	285
2006	Lola B02/00	Ford XFE V8t	B	(United States) Buddy Rice	7														10								23rd	11
2007						LSV	LBH	HOU	POR	CLE	MTT	TOR	EDM	SJO	ROA	ZOL	ASN	SFR	MXC									
2007	Panoz DP01	Cosworth XFE V8t	B	(Canada) Paul Tracy	3	3			10	1	15	14	5	11	12	10	17	9	5								11th	171
2007	Panoz DP01	Cosworth XFE V8t	B	(Spain) Oriol Servià	3		2	4																			6th	237
2007	Panoz DP01	Cosworth XFE V8t	B	(Spain) Oriol Servià	7				11	7	9	10*	6	3*	4	6	8										6th	237
2007	Panoz DP01	Cosworth XFE V8t	B	(Mexico) Mario Domínguez	7	9	17	6																			18th	78
2007	Panoz DP01	Cosworth XFE V8t	B	(Mexico) David Martínez	7													10	14								20th	18

1. The Firestone Firehawk 600 was canceled after qualifying due to excessive g-forces on the drivers.

=== Complete IndyCar Series results ===
(key)

Year	Chassis	Engine	Tyres	Drivers	No.	1	2	3	4	5	6	7	8	9	10	11	12	13	14	15	16	17	18	19	Pts Pos	Pos
2008						HMS	STP	MOT	LBH^{1}	KAN	INDY	MIL	TXS	IOW	RIR	WGL	NSH	MDO	EDM	KTY	SNM	DET	CHI	SRF^{2}		
2008	Panoz DP01	Cosworth XFE V8t	**B**	(Canada) Paul Tracy	3				11																33rd	**51**
2008	Panoz DP01	Cosworth XFE V8t	**B**	(France) Franck Montagny	7				2																NC	—
2008	Panoz DP01	Cosworth XFE V8t	**B**	(Mexico) David Martínez	37				8																NC	—

1. Run to Champ Car specifications.
2. Non-points-paying, exhibition race.

== IndyCar wins ==
#	Season	Date	Sanction	Track / Race	No.	Winning driver	Chassis	Engine	Tire	Grid	Laps Led
1	1982	September 19	CART	Road America (R)	32	(Mexico) Héctor Rebaque (R)	March 82C	Cosworth DFX V8t	Goodyear	9	1
2	1983	August 14	CART	Pocono 500 (O)	33	(Italy) Teo Fabi (R)	March 83C	Cosworth DFX V8t	Goodyear	2	116
3	1983	September 11	CART	Mid-Ohio Sports Car Course (R)	33	(Italy) Teo Fabi (R) (2)	March 83C	Cosworth DFX V8t	Goodyear	2	40
4	1983	October 23	CART	Laguna Seca Raceway (R)	33	(Italy) Teo Fabi (R) (3)	March 83C	Cosworth DFX V8t	Goodyear	Pole	95
5	1983	October 29	CART	Phoenix International Raceway (O)	33	(Italy) Teo Fabi (R) (4)	March 83C	Cosworth DFX V8t	Goodyear	Pole	138
6	1997	June 1	CART	Milwaukee Mile (O)	99	(Canada) Greg Moore	Reynard 97i	Mercedes-Benz IC108D V8t	Firestone	5	104
7	1997	June 8	CART	Detroit Belle Isle Grand Prix (S)	99	(Canada) Greg Moore (2)	Reynard 97i	Mercedes-Benz IC108D V8t	Firestone	7	20
8	1998	May 10	CART	Rio 200 (O)	99	(Canada) Greg Moore (3)	Reynard 98i	Mercedes-Benz IC108E V8t	Firestone	7	5
9	1998	July 26	CART	Michigan 500 (O)	99	(Canada) Greg Moore (4)	Reynard 98i	Mercedes-Benz IC108E V8t	Firestone	14	36
10	1999	March 21	CART	Homestead–Miami Speedway (O)	99	(Canada) Greg Moore (5)	Reynard 99i	Mercedes-Benz IC108E V8t	Firestone	Pole	96
11	1999	July 25	CART	Michigan 500 (O)	44	(Brazil) Tony Kanaan	Reynard 99i	Honda HRS V8t	Firestone	11	7
12	2001	July 22	CART	Michigan 500 (O)	32	(Canada) Patrick Carpentier	Reynard 01i	Ford XF V8t	Firestone	21	3
13	2002	July 14	CART	Grand Prix of Cleveland (S)	32	(Canada) Patrick Carpentier (2)	Reynard 02i	Ford XF V8t	Bridgestone	2	66
14	2002	August 11	CART	Mid-Ohio Sports Car Course (R)	32	(Canada) Patrick Carpentier (3)	Reynard 02i	Ford XF V8t	Bridgestone	Pole	89
15	2003	February 23	CART	Grand Prix of St. Petersburg (S)	3	(Canada) Paul Tracy	Lola B02/00	Ford XFE V8t	Bridgestone	2	71
16	2003	March 23	CART	Fundidora Park (S)	3	(Canada) Paul Tracy (2)	Lola B02/00	Ford XFE V8t	Bridgestone	2	69
17	2003	April 13	CART	Grand Prix of Long Beach (S)	3	(Canada) Paul Tracy (3)	Lola B02/00	Ford XFE V8t	Bridgestone	2	33
18	2003	June 15	CART	Laguna Seca Raceway (R)	32	(Canada) Patrick Carpentier (4)	Lola B02/00	Ford XFE V8t	Bridgestone	Pole	87
19	2003	July 13	CART	Exhibition Place, Toronto (S)	3	(Canada) Paul Tracy (4)	Lola B02/00	Ford XFE V8t	Bridgestone	Pole	112
20	2003	July 27	CART	Streets of Vancouver (S)	3	(Canada) Paul Tracy (5)	Lola B02/00	Ford XFE V8t	Bridgestone	Pole	77
21	2003	August 10	CART	Mid-Ohio Sports Car Course (R)	3	(Canada) Paul Tracy (6)	Lola B02/00	Ford XFE V8t	Bridgestone	Pole	69
22	2003	October 12	CART	Autódromo Hermanos Rodríguez (R)	3	(Canada) Paul Tracy (7)	Lola B02/00	Ford XFE V8t	Bridgestone	Pole	64
23	2004	April 18	CART	Grand Prix of Long Beach (S)	1	(Canada) Paul Tracy (8)	Lola B02/00	Ford XFE V8t	Bridgestone	3	78
24	2004	July 25	CART	Streets of Vancouver (S)	1	(Canada) Paul Tracy (9)	Lola B02/00	Ford XFE V8t	Bridgestone	Pole	81
25	2004	September 12	CART	Laguna Seca Raceway (R)	7	(Canada) Patrick Carpentier (5)	Lola B02/00	Ford XFE V8t	Bridgestone	2	40
26	2005	June 4	CART	Milwaukee Mile (O)	3	(Canada) Paul Tracy (10)	Lola B02/00	Ford XFE V8t	Bridgestone	5	192
27	2005	June 26	CART	Grand Prix of Cleveland (S)	3	(Canada) Paul Tracy (11)	Lola B02/00	Ford XFE V8t	Bridgestone	Pole	46
28	2006	June 18	CART	Grand Prix of Portland (R)	7	(United States) A. J. Allmendinger	Lola B02/00	Ford XFE V8t	Bridgestone	2	100
29	2006	June 25	CART	Grand Prix of Cleveland (S)	7	(United States) A. J. Allmendinger (2)	Lola B02/00	Ford XFE V8t	Bridgestone	Pole	36
30	2006	July 9	CART	Exhibition Place, Toronto (S)	7	(United States) A. J. Allmendinger (3)	Lola B02/00	Ford XFE V8t	Bridgestone	2	38
31	2006	August 13	CART	Grand Prix of Denver (S)	7	(United States) A. J. Allmendinger (4)	Lola B02/00	Ford XFE V8t	Bridgestone	2	45
32	2006	September 24	CART	Road America (R)	7	(United States) A. J. Allmendinger (5)	Lola B02/00	Ford XFE V8t	Bridgestone	5	7
33	2007	June 24	CART	Grand Prix of Cleveland (S)	3	(Canada) Paul Tracy (12)	Panoz DP01	Cosworth XFE V8t	Bridgestone	7	26

- Note: this does not include the win achieved by Jacques Villeneuve at Road America in 1994 as a driver of Forsythe-Green Racing.
