= 1998 CART FedEx Championship Series =

American motorsport season

1998 CART season
- FedEx Championship Series

Season
- Races: 19
- Start date: March 15
- End date: November 1

Awards
- Drivers' champion: (Italy) Alex Zanardi
- Constructors' Cup: (United Kingdom) Reynard
- Manufacturers' Cup: (Japan) Honda
- Nations' Cup: United States
- Rookie of the Year: (Brazil) Tony Kanaan

The 1998 FedEx Championship Series season was the twentieth in the Championship Auto Racing Teams (CART) era of American open-wheel car racing. It consisted of 19 races, beginning in Homestead, Florida on March 15 and concluding in Fontana, California on November 1. The FedEx Championship Series Drivers' Champion was Alex Zanardi, his second consecutive championship, while the series' Rookie of the Year was Tony Kanaan. This was the first of five years of sponsorship by FDX Corporation, who became FedEx Corporation in 2000.

The season was marred by a deadly crash on lap 175 of the U.S. 500. Adrián Fernández slammed into the outside wall in the fourth turn of Michigan International Speedway. His right front wheel was torn off and hurled over the fence into the stands, killing three spectators (Kenneth Fox, Sheryl Laster, and Michael Tautkus) and injuring six others. Fernández was uninjured.

This was the final season with Bobby Rahal, Hiro Matsushita and André Ribeiro on the CART grid. Other notable events of the 1998 season include first wins for Bryan Herta and future Indycar Series and Indianapolis 500 champion Dario Franchitti. Mexican driver Adrián Fernández got his second career win at Twin Ring Motegi, the first race run there by Champ Cars.

== Drivers and constructors ==
The following teams and drivers competed in the 1998 CART Championship Series season.

Team	Chassis	Engine	Tires	No	Drivers	Rounds	Primary Sponsors
(United States) Chip Ganassi Racing	Reynard 98I	Honda HRK	F	1	(Italy) Alex Zanardi	All	Target
(United States) Chip Ganassi Racing	Reynard 98I	Honda HRK	F	12	(United States) Jimmy Vasser	All	Target
(United States) Marlboro Team Penske	Penske PC-27	Mercedes IC108E	G	2	(United States) Al Unser Jr.	All	Marlboro
(United States) Marlboro Team Penske	Penske PC-27	Mercedes IC108E	G	3	(Brazil) André Ribeiro	All	Marlboro
(United States) Walker Racing	Reynard 98I	Honda HRK	G	5	(Brazil) Gil de Ferran	All	Valvoline
(United States) Newman-Haas Racing	Swift 009.c	Ford XB	G	6	(United States) Michael Andretti	All	Texaco-Havoline
(United States) Newman-Haas Racing	Swift 009.c	Ford XB	G	11	(Brazil) Christian Fittipaldi	1–6, 8–19	Kmart
(United States) Newman-Haas Racing	Swift 009.c	Ford XB	G	11	(Brazil) Roberto Moreno	7	Kmart
(United States) Team Rahal	Reynard 98I	Ford XB	F	7	(United States) Bobby Rahal	All	Miller Lite
(United States) Team Rahal	Reynard 98I	Ford XB	F	8	(United States) Bryan Herta	All	Shell
(United States) Hogan Racing	Reynard 98I	Mercedes IC108E	F	9	(Finland) JJ Lehto	All	Hogan Motor Leasing
(United States) Della Penna Motorsports	Swift 009.c	Ford XB	F	10	(United States) Richie Hearn	All	Budweiser
(United States) Della Penna Motorsports	Swift 009.c	Ford XB	F	43	(Japan) Hideshi Matsuda	2	BMB Mini-Juke
(United States) Project CART	Reynard 98I	Mercedes IC108E	G	15	(Brazil) Roberto Moreno	1–2	Hawaiian Tropic
(United States) Project CART	Reynard 98I	Mercedes IC108E	G	15	(Italy) Domenico Schiattarella	3	Hawaiian Tropic
(United States) Bettenhausen Racing	Reynard 98I	Mercedes IC108E	G	16	(Brazil) Hélio Castroneves	All	Alumax
(United States) PacWest Racing Group	Reynard 97I	Mercedes IC108E	F	17	(Brazil) Maurício Gugelmin	1–3	Hollywood Cigarettes
(United States) PacWest Racing Group	Reynard 97I	Mercedes IC108E	F	17	(Brazil) Maurício Gugelmin	3–19	Hollywood Cigarettes
(United States) PacWest Racing Group	Reynard 98I	Mercedes IC108E	F	18	(United Kingdom) Mark Blundell	1–3	Motorola
(United States) PacWest Racing Group	Reynard 98I	Mercedes IC108E	F	18	(United Kingdom) Mark Blundell	3–19	Motorola
(United States) Payton/Coyne Racing	Reynard 98I	Ford XB	F	19	(Mexico) Michel Jourdain Jr.	All	Herdez
(United States) Payton/Coyne Racing	Reynard 98I	Ford XB	F	34	(United States) Dennis Vitolo	1, 4, 6–10, 12, 15–19	SmithKline Beecham 15; Payton/Coyne Racing 3 Banco Cacique 1
(United States) Payton/Coyne Racing	Reynard 98I	Ford XB	F	34	(Brazil) Gualter Salles	2–3, 5, 11, 13–14	SmithKline Beecham 15; Payton/Coyne Racing 3 Banco Cacique 1
(United States) Patrick Racing	Reynard 98I	Ford XB	F	20	(United States) Scott Pruett	All	Visteon
(United States) Patrick Racing	Reynard 98I	Ford XB	F	40	(Mexico) Adrián Fernández	All	Tecate Beer
(United States) Tasman Motorsports Group	Reynard 98I	Honda HRK	F	21	(Brazil) Tony Kanaan	All	LCI
(United States) Arciero-Wells Racing	Reynard 98I	Toyota RV8C	F	24	(Japan) Hiro Matsushita	1–3, 5	Panasonic
(United States) Arciero-Wells Racing	Reynard 98I	Toyota RV8C	F	24	(United States) Robby Gordon	4, 6–19	Panasonic
(United States) Arciero-Wells Racing	Reynard 98I	Toyota RV8C	F	25	(Italy) Max Papis	All	MCI Worldcom
(United States) Team KOOL Green	Reynard 98I	Honda HRK	F	26	(Canada) Paul Tracy	All	KOOL
(United States) Team KOOL Green	Reynard 98I	Honda HRK	F	27	(United Kingdom) Dario Franchitti	All	KOOL
(United States) Forsythe Racing	Reynard 98I	Mercedes IC108E	F	33	(Canada) Patrick Carpentier	All	Player's
(United States) Forsythe Racing	Reynard 98I	Mercedes IC108E	F	99	(Canada) Greg Moore	All	Player's
(United States) All American Racing	Reynard	Toyota RV8C	G	98	(United States) P. J. Jones	1–15	Castrol
(United States) All American Racing	Reynard	Toyota RV8C	G	36	(United States) Alex Barron	1–12	Castrol
(United States) All American Racing	Eagle 987	Toyota RV8C	G	36	(United States) Alex Barron	13–19	Castrol
(United States) All American Racing	Eagle 987	Toyota RV8C	G	98	(Italy) Vincenzo Sospiri	16–19	Castrol
(United States) Davis Racing	Lola T98/00	Ford XB	G	77	(Germany) Arnd Meier	All	BAAN Business Software 8 Hasseröder 11

== Schedule ==
Icon	Legend
O	Oval/Speedway
R	Road course
S	Street circuit

Rnd	Date	Race Name	Circuit	Location
1	March 15	(United States) Marlboro Grand Prix of Miami	O Homestead-Miami Speedway	Homestead, Florida
2	March 28	(Japan) Budweiser 500K	O Twin Ring Motegi	Motegi, Japan
3	April 5	(United States) Toyota Grand Prix of Long Beach	S Streets of Long Beach	Long Beach, California
4	April 27*	(United States) Bosch Spark Plug Grand Prix	O Nazareth Speedway	Nazareth, Pennsylvania
5	May 10	(Brazil) Rio 400K	O Autódromo de Jacarepaguá	Rio de Janeiro, Brazil
6	May 23	(United States) Motorola 300	O Gateway International Raceway	Madison, Illinois
7	May 31	(United States) Miller Lite 200	O Milwaukee Mile	West Allis, Wisconsin
8	June 7	(United States) ITT Automotive Detroit Grand Prix	S The Raceway on Belle Isle Park	Detroit, Michigan
9	June 21	(United States) Budweiser/G. I. Joe's 200	R Portland International Raceway	Portland, Oregon
10	July 12	(United States) Medic Drug Grand Prix of Cleveland	R Cleveland Burke Lakefront Airport	Cleveland, Ohio
11	July 19	(Canada) Molson Indy Toronto	S Exhibition Place	Toronto, Ontario
12	July 26	(United States) U.S. 500	O Michigan Speedway	Brooklyn, Michigan
13	August 9	(United States) Miller Lite 200	R Mid-Ohio Sports Car Course	Lexington, Ohio
14	August 16	(United States) Texaco/Havoline 200	R Road America	Elkhart Lake, Wisconsin
15	September 6	(Canada) Molson Indy Vancouver	S Streets of Vancouver	Vancouver, British Columbia
16	September 13	(United States) Honda Grand Prix of Monterey	R Laguna Seca Raceway	Monterey, California
17	October 4	(United States) Texaco Grand Prix of Houston	S George R. Brown Convention Center	Houston, Texas
18	October 18	(Australia) Honda Indy 300	S Surfers Paradise Street Circuit	Surfers Paradise, Australia
19	November 1	(United States) Marlboro 500	O California Speedway	Fontana, California

* The Nazareth race was scheduled for April 26, but postponed due to rain.
* The Houston race was scheduled for 153 miles, but was shortened due to poor visibility.

== Results ==
Round	Race	Pole position	Fastest lap	Race Winner				Race Time	Report
Round	Race	Pole position	Fastest lap	Driver	Team	Chassis	Engine	Race Time	Report
1	(United States) Homestead	(Canada) Greg Moore	(Canada) Greg Moore	(United States) Michael Andretti	Newman-Haas Racing	Swift	Ford	1:33:39	Report
2	(Japan) Motegi	(United States) Jimmy Vasser	(United States) Jimmy Vasser	(Mexico) Adrián Fernández	Patrick Racing	Reynard	Ford	1:57:12	Report
3	(United States) Long Beach	(United States) Bryan Herta	(United States) Bobby Rahal	(Italy) Alex Zanardi	Chip Ganassi Racing	Reynard	Honda	1:51:29	Report
4	(United States) Nazareth	(Canada) Patrick Carpentier	(Canada) Greg Moore	(United States) Jimmy Vasser	Chip Ganassi Racing	Reynard	Honda	1:57:20	Report
5	(Brazil) Rio	(United Kingdom) Dario Franchitti	(Italy) Alex Zanardi	(Canada) Greg Moore	Forsythe Racing	Reynard	Mercedes	1:52:14	Report
6	(United States) Gateway	(Canada) Greg Moore	(United States) Jimmy Vasser	(Italy) Alex Zanardi	Chip Ganassi Racing	Reynard	Honda	2:23:02	Report
7	(United States) Milwaukee	(Canada) Patrick Carpentier	(United States) Scott Pruett	(United States) Jimmy Vasser	Chip Ganassi Racing	Reynard	Honda	1:34:17	Report
8	(United States) Belle Isle	(Canada) Greg Moore	(Italy) Alex Zanardi	(Italy) Alex Zanardi	Chip Ganassi Racing	Reynard	Honda	1:41:17	Report
9	(United States) Portland	(United States) Bryan Herta	(Canada) Patrick Carpentier	(Italy) Alex Zanardi	Chip Ganassi Racing	Reynard	Honda	1:54:06	Report
10	(United States) Cleveland	(United States) Jimmy Vasser	(United States) Bryan Herta	(Italy) Alex Zanardi	Chip Ganassi Racing	Reynard	Honda	1:52:22	Report
11	(Canada) Toronto	(United Kingdom) Dario Franchitti	(Brazil) Christian Fittipaldi	(Italy) Alex Zanardi	Chip Ganassi Racing	Reynard	Honda	1:52:24	Report
12	(United States) Michigan	(Mexico) Adrián Fernández	(Canada) Patrick Carpentier	(Canada) Greg Moore	Forsythe Racing	Reynard	Mercedes	3:00:48	Report
13	(United States) Mid-Ohio	(United Kingdom) Dario Franchitti	(Canada) Greg Moore	(Mexico) Adrián Fernández	Patrick Racing	Reynard	Ford	1:53:39	Report
14	(United States) Road America	(United States) Michael Andretti	(Italy) Alex Zanardi	(United Kingdom) Dario Franchitti	Team KOOL Green	Reynard	Honda	1:35:30	Report
15	(Canada) Vancouver	(United Kingdom) Dario Franchitti	(Brazil) Hélio Castroneves	(United Kingdom) Dario Franchitti	Team KOOL Green	Reynard	Honda	2:00:37	Report
16	(United States) Laguna Seca	(United States) Bryan Herta	(Brazil) Tony Kanaan	(United States) Bryan Herta	Team Rahal	Reynard	Ford	1:55:13	Report
17	(United States) Houston	(Canada) Greg Moore	(Italy) Alex Zanardi	(United Kingdom) Dario Franchitti	Team KOOL Green	Reynard	Honda	1:36:30	Report
18	(Australia) Surfers Paradise	(United Kingdom) Dario Franchitti	(Italy) Alex Zanardi	(Italy) Alex Zanardi	Chip Ganassi Racing	Reynard	Honda	2:01:51	Report
19	(United States) Fontana	(United States) Scott Pruett	(Canada) Greg Moore	(United States) Jimmy Vasser	Chip Ganassi Racing	Reynard	Honda	3:17:54	Report

=== Final driver standings ===
Pos	Driver	HOM (United States)	MOT (Japan)	LBH (United States)	NAZ (United States)	RIO (Brazil)	GTW (United States)	MIL (United States)	BEL (United States)	POR (United States)	CLE (United States)	TOR (Canada)	MIS (United States)	MOH (United States)	ROA (United States)	VAN (Canada)	LAG (United States)	HOU (United States)	SUR (Australia)	CAL (United States)	Pts
1	(Italy) Alex Zanardi	3	23	1	2	2*	1	8	1*	1*	1*	1	3*	12	2	4	2	2	1*	3	285
2	(United States) Jimmy Vasser	16	**7**	8	1	6	4	1*	6	8	**7**	3	2	27	9	26	5	4	24	1*	169
3	(United Kingdom) Dario Franchitti	9	8	2	21	**19**	27	4	4	21	3	**20***	21	**26**	1*	**1***	4	1*	**2**	22	160
4	(Mexico) Adrián Fernández	6	1*	4	26	3	18	9	2	24	5	9	**23**	1	5	15	7	6	6	4	154
5	(Canada) Greg Moore	**2**	4	6	3	1	**3**	13	**5**	27	25	11	1	22	21	20	21	**26**	8	2	141
6	(United States) Scott Pruett	5	21	12	22	18	5	10	9	2	4	6	4	2	20	3	18	11	4	**20**	121
7	(United States) Michael Andretti	1*	14	21	18*	5	2*	26	10	17	2	2	6	21	**15**	2	10	28	20	18	112
8	(United States) Bryan Herta	8	28	**3**	8	4	23	11	21	**3**	13	5	10	25	23	22	**1***	8	10	15	97
9	(Brazil) Tony Kanaan RY	29	6	5	9	27	24	17	8	4	14	22	11	8	4	18	3	3	7	19	92
10	(United States) Bobby Rahal	19	17	17	6	8	8	5	11	6	8	4	7	3	8	25	16	23	25	11	82
11	(United States) Al Unser Jr.	22	2	29	15	16	19	3	24	5	17	17	22	6	27	5	6	7	22	27	72
12	(Brazil) Gil de Ferran	7	3	20*	4	26	6	22	3	20	6	27	16	9	16	13	19	21	14	17	67
13	(Canada) Paul Tracy	27	5	25	5	25	26	7	7	28	19	14	9	5	6	11	8	20	23	14	61
14	(Brazil) Christian Fittipaldi	4	25	26	11	21	11	Wth	17	26	11	16	25	13	3	14	9	27	3	7	56
15	(Brazil) Maurício Gugelmin	10	20	10	17	9	16	21	19	7	20	12	13	4*	19	6	27	18	12	5	49
16	(United States) Richie Hearn	13	27	23	10	7	28	6	23	10	18	7	5	24	13	16	11	9	18	8	47
17	(Brazil) Hélio Castroneves R	24	11	9	23	23	7	2	12	13	27	10	12	17	26	24	23	24	21	10	36
18	(United Kingdom) Mark Blundell	12	10	7	20	11	10	12	22	22	10	26	17	19	7	12	25	14	11	6	36
19	(Canada) Patrick Carpentier	11	19	28	**13**	17	15	**25**	15	9	9	25	8	7	28	27	17	22	9	26	27
20	(Finland) JJ Lehto R	14	29	18	16	10	9	19	26	25	28	24	20	15	18	8	28	10	5	21	25
21	(Italy) Max Papis	26	13	24	14	28	22	16	18	11	12	8	19	14	11	9	12	5	17	16	25
22	(Brazil) André Ribeiro	17	9	22	DNQ	22	20	18	16	15	22	23	28	10	25	7	14	17	13	28	13
23	(United States) Robby Gordon				7		13	20	14	23	23	13	27	11	12	23	13	13	16	9	13
24	(Mexico) Michel Jourdain Jr.	28	22	27	12	24	17	15	13	19	26	18	18	28	14	10	24	25	26	12	5
25	(Germany) Arnd Meier	21	15	15	24	14	21	23	27	12	16	15	14	18	10	28	15	16	27	24	4
26	(United States) P. J. Jones	20	30	11	19	13	12	14	25	16	21	19	24	20	22	21					3
27	(United States) Alex Barron R	18	24	14	DNQ	12	14	DNQ	20	14	15	28	15	16	24	19	20	12	19	13	2
28	(Brazil) Gualter Salles		12	13		20						21		23	17						1
29	(Italy) Vincenzo Sospiri R																22	15	15	23	0
30	(Japan) Hiro Matsushita	23	16	19		15															0
31	(Brazil) Roberto Moreno	15	26					24													0
32	(Italy) Domenico Schiattarella			16																	0
33	(United States) Dennis Vitolo	25			25		25	DNQ	28	18	24		26			17	26	19	DNQ	25	0
34	(Japan) Hideshi Matsuda		18																		0
Pos	Driver	HOM (United States)	MOT (Japan)	LBH (United States)	NAZ (United States)	RIO (Brazil)	GTW (United States)	MIL (United States)	BEL (United States)	POR (United States)	CLE (United States)	TOR (Canada)	MIS (United States)	MOH (United States)	ROA (United States)	VAN (Canada)	LAG (United States)	HOU (United States)	SUR (Australia)	CAL (United States)	Pts

Color	Result
Gold	Winner
Silver	2nd place
Bronze	3rd place
Green	4th–6th place
Light Blue	7th–12th place
Dark Blue	Finished (Outside Top 12)
Purple	Did not finish
Red	Did not qualify (DNQ)
Brown	Withdrawn (Wth)
Black	Disqualified (DSQ)
White	Did not start (DNS)
Blank	Did not participate (DNP)
Blank	Not competing

**In-line notation**
**Bold**	Pole position
Italics	Ran fastest race lap
*	Led most race laps
RY	Rookie of the Year
R	Rookie

=== Nations' Cup ===
- Top result per race counts towards Nations' Cup.

Pos	Country	HOM (United States)	MOT (Japan)	LBH (United States)	NAZ (United States)	RIO (Brazil)	GTW (United States)	MIL (United States)	BEL (United States)	POR (United States)	CLE (United States)	TOR (Canada)	MIS (United States)	MOH (United States)	ROA (United States)	VAN (Canada)	LAG (United States)	HOU (United States)	SUR (Australia)	CAL (United States)	Pts
1	United States	1	2	3	1	4	2	1	6	2	2	2	2	2	8	2	1	4	4	1	303
2	Italy	3	13	1	2	2	1	8	1	1	1	1	3	12	2	4	2	2	1	3	285
3	Brazil	4	3	5	4	9	6	2	3	4	6	10	11	4	3	6	3	3	3	5	203
4	Canada	2	4	6	3	1	3	7	5	9	9	11	1	5	6	11	8	20	8	2	182
5	United Kingdom	9	8	2	20	11	10	4	4	21	3	20	17	19	1	1	4	1	2	6	168
6	Mexico	6	1	4	12	3	17	9	2	19	5	9	18	1	5	10	7	6	6	4	158
7	Finland	14	29	18	16	10	9	19	26	25	28	24	20	15	18	8	28	10	5	21	25
8	Germany	21	15	15	24	14	21	23	27	12	16	15	14	18	10	28	15	16	27	24	4
9	Japan	23	16	19		15															0
Pos	Country	HOM (United States)	MOT (Japan)	LBH (United States)	NAZ (United States)	RIO (Brazil)	GTW (United States)	MIL (United States)	BEL (United States)	POR (United States)	CLE (United States)	TOR (Canada)	MIS (United States)	MOH (United States)	ROA (United States)	VAN (Canada)	LAG (United States)	HOU (United States)	SUR (Australia)	CAL (United States)	Pts

=== Chassis Constructors' Cup ===
Pos	Chassis	Pts	Wins
1	(United Kingdom) Reynard 98I	409	18
2	(United States) Swift 009.c	167	1
3	(United States) Penske PC-27	72	0
4	(United Kingdom) Lola T98/00	4	0
5	(United States) Eagle 987	1	0
Pos	Chassis	Pts	Wins

=== Engine Manufacturers' Cup ===
Pos	Engine	Pts	Wins
1	(Japan) Honda	365	13
2	(United States) Ford XB	293	4
3	(Germany) Mercedes	226	2
4	(Japan) Toyota	41	0
Pos	Engine	Pts	Wins

=== Driver breakdown ===
Pos	Driver	Team	Entries	Wins	Podiums	Top 5s	Top 10s	Poles	Points
1	(Italy) Zanardi	(United States) Chip Ganassi Racing	19	7	15	16	17	0	285
2	(United States) Vasser	(United States) Chip Ganassi Racing	19	3	5	8	15	2	169
3	(United Kingdom) Franchitti	(United States) Team KOOL Green	19	3	6	9	11	5	160
4	(Mexico) Fernandez	(United States) Patrick Racing	19	2	4	8	14	1	154
5	(Canada) Moore	(United States) Forsythe Racing	19	2	6	8	10	4	141
6	(United States) Pruett	(United States) Patrick Racing	19	0	3	8	11	1	121
7	(United States) Andretti	(United States) Newman-Haas Racing	19	1	5	6	9	1	112
8	(United States) Herta	(United States) Team Rahal	19	1	3	5	10	3	97
9	(Brazil) Kanaan	(United States) Tasman Racing	19	0	2	5	10	0	92
10	(United States) Rahal	(United States) Team Rahal	19	0	1	3	10	0	82
11	(United States) Unser Jr.	(United States) Marlboro Team Penske	19	0	2	4	7	0	72
12	(Brazil) de Ferran	(United States) Walker Racing	19	0	2	3	7	0	67
13	(Canada) Tracy	(United States) Team KOOL Green	19	0	0	3	8	0	61
14	(Brazil) Fittipaldi	(United States) Newman-Haas Racing	18	0	2	3	5	0	56
15	(Brazil) Gugelmin	(United States) PacWest Racing	19	0	0	2	7	0	49
16	(United States) Hearn	(United States) Della Penna Motorsports	19	0	0	1	8	0	47
17	(Brazil) Castroneves	(United States) Bettenhausen Racing	19	0	1	1	5	0	36
17	(United Kingdom) Blundell	(United States) PacWest Racing	19	0	0	0	6	0	36
19	(Canada) Carpentier	(United States) Forsythe Racing	19	0	0	0	5	2	27
20	(Finland) Lehto	(United States) Hogan Racing	19	0	0	1	5	0	25
20	(Italy) Papis	(United States) Arciero-Wells Racing	19	0	0	1	3	0	25
22	(Brazil) Ribeiro	(United States) Marlboro Team Penske	18	0	0	0	3	0	13
22	(United States) Gordon	(United States) Arciero-Wells Racing	15	0	0	0	2	0	13
24	(Mexico) Jourdain Jr.	(United States) Dale Coyne Racing	19	0	0	0	1	0	5
25	(Germany) Meier	(United States) Davis Racing	19	0	0	0	1	0	4
26	(United States) Jones	(United States) All American Racing	15	0	0	0	0	0	3
27	(United States) Barron	(United States) All American Racing	17	0	0	0	0	0	2
28	(Brazil) Salles	(United States) Dale Coyne Racing	6	0	0	0	0	0	1
29	(United States) Vitolo	(United States) Dale Coyne Racing	11	0	0	0	0	0	0
29	(Italy) Sospiri	(United States) All American Racing	4	0	0	0	0	0	0
29	(Japan) Matsushita	(United States) Arciero-Wells Racing	4	0	0	0	0	0	0
29	(Brazil) Moreno	(United States) Newman-Haas Racing (United States) Project CART	3	0	0	0	0	0	0
29	(Italy) Schiattarella	(United States) Project CART	1	0	0	0	0	0	0
29	(Japan) Matsuda	(United States) Beck Motorsports	1	0	0	0	0	0	0

== Bibliography ==
- Shaw, Jeremy, ed. (1998). Autocourse Cart 1998-99: Official Champ Car Yearbook. Richmond, Surrey: Hazleton Publishing. ISBN 978-1-874557-33-3.

== See also ==
- 1998 Toyota Atlantic Championship season
- 1998 Indianapolis 500
- 1998 Indy Racing League
- 1998 Indy Lights season
