= 1998 Budweiser 500k =

(Japan) 1998 Budweiser 500k
Race details
- Race 2 of 19 in the 1998 CART season
- Layout of the track
- Date: March 28, 1998
- Official name: Budweiser 500k
- Location: Twin Ring Motegi, Motegi, Japan
- Course: Permanent racing facility 1.520 mi / 2.493 km
- Distance: 201 laps 311.3 mi / 500.988 km

Pole position
- Driver: (United States) Jimmy Vasser (Chip Ganassi Racing)
- Time: No time trials

Podium
- First: (Mexico) Adrián Fernández (Patrick Racing)
- Second: (United States) Al Unser Jr. (Marlboro Team Penske)
- Third: (Brazil) Gil de Ferran (Walker Racing)

The 1998 Budweiser 500K was a CART race that took place at the Twin Ring Motegi in Motegi, Japan on March 28, 1998. It was the 2nd round of the 1998 CART season.

== Race results ==
Pos	No	Driver	Team	Laps	Time/Retired	Grid	Points
1	40	(Mexico) Adrián Fernández	Patrick Racing	201	1:57:12.016	2	21
2	2	(United States) Al Unser Jr.	Team Penske	201	+1.086	15	16
3	5	(Brazil) Gil de Ferran	Walker Racing	201	+5.388	3	14
4	99	(Canada) Greg Moore	Forsythe Racing	201	+7.923	5	12
5	26	(Canada) Paul Tracy	Team Green	201	+8.150	16	10
6	21	(Brazil) Tony Kanaan	Tasman Motorsports Group	200	+1 Lap	10	8
7	12	(United States) Jimmy Vasser	Chip Ganassi Racing	200	+1 Lap	1	6
8	27	(United Kingdom) Dario Franchitti	Team Green	200	+1 Lap	6	5
9	3	(Brazil) André Ribeiro	Team Penske	199	+2 Lap	8	4
10	18	(United Kingdom) Mark Blundell	PacWest Racing Group	199	+2 Laps	7	3
11	16	(Brazil) Hélio Castro-Neves	Bettenhausen Racing	198	+3 Laps	26	2
12	34	(Brazil) Gualter Salles	Payton/Coyne Racing	198	+3 Laps	13	1
13	25	(Italy) Max Papis	Arciero-Wells Racing	197	+4 Laps	23	
14	6	(United States) Michael Andretti	Newman-Haas Racing	195	+6 Laps	14	
15	77	(Germany) Arnd Meier	Davis Racing	195	+6 Laps	27	
16	24	(Japan) Hiro Matsushita	Arciero-Wells Racing	188	+13 Laps	30	
17	7	(United States) Bobby Rahal	Team Rahal	185	Contact	17	
18	43	(Japan) Hideshi Matsuda	Della Penna Motorsports	185	+16 Laps	25	
19	33	(Canada) Patrick Carpentier	Forsythe Racing	163	Wheel Bearing	20	
20	17	(Brazil) Maurício Gugelmin	PacWest Racing Group	147	Wheel Bearing	11	
21	20	(United States) Scott Pruett	Patrick Racing	146	Engine	12	
22	19	(Mexico) Michel Jourdain Jr.	Payton/Coyne Racing	121	Engine	24	
23	1	(Italy) Alex Zanardi	Chip Ganassi Racing	118	Contact	4	
24	36	(United States) Alex Barron	All American Racing	108	Transmission	28	
25	11	(Brazil) Christian Fittipaldi	Newman-Haas Racing	98	Engine	19	
26	15	(Brazil) Roberto Moreno	Project Indy	86	Transmission	22	
27	10	(United States) Richie Hearn	Della Penna Motorsports	74	Engine	21	
28	8	(United States) Bryan Herta	Team Rahal	49	Clutch	9	
29	9	(Finland) JJ Lehto	Hogan Racing	45	Electrical	18	
30	98	(United States) P. J. Jones	All American Racing	16	Oil Leak	29	

=== Race statistics ===
Lap Leaders
Laps	Leader
1–22	Adrian Fernandez
23-44	Jimmy Vasser
45-47	Adrian Fernandez
48-69	Jimmy Vasser
70-86	Michael Andretti
87-95	Al Unser Jr.
96-99	Adrian Fernandez
100-116	Al Unser Jr.
117-159	Adrian Fernandez
160-163	Paul Tracy
164-167	Gil de Ferran
168-171	Greg Moore
172-201	Adrian Fernandez

Cautions: 3 for 37 laps
Laps	Reason
101-115	Christian Fittipaldi car smoke
120-130	Alex Zanardi accident turn 2
186-196	Bobby Rahal accident turn 2

== Standings after the race ==
Drivers' Championship standings

Pos	Driver	Points
1	(Mexico) Adrian Fernandez	29
2	(Canada) Greg Moore	29
3	(United States) Michael Andretti	21
4	(Brazil) Gil de Ferran	20
5	(United States) Al Unser Jr.	16

Previous race: 1998 Marlboro Grand Prix of Miami	CART FedEx Championship Series; 1998 season	Next race: 1998 Toyota Grand Prix of Long Beach
Previous race: 1966 Fuji 200	Budweiser 500k	Next race: 1999 Firestone Firehawk 500K
