= 1985 Macau Grand Prix =

Formula Three motor race

Race details
Date	24 November 1985
Location	Guia Circuit, Macau
Course	Temporary street circuit 6.120 km (3.803 mi)
Distance	Leg 1; 12 laps, 73.44 km (45.63 mi); Leg 2; 15 laps, 91.8 km (57.0 mi)
- Leg 1

Pole
Driver	(Brazil) Maurício Gugelmin
Time	2:23.19

Fastest Lap
Driver	(Brazil) Maurício Gugelmin
Time	2:23.94

Podium
First	(Brazil) Maurício Gugelmin
Second	(New Zealand) Mike Thackwell
Third	(Netherlands) Jan Lammers
- Leg 2

Pole
Driver	(Brazil) Maurício Gugelmin

Fastest Lap
Driver	(New Zealand) Mike Thackwell
Time	2:22.91

Podium
First	(Brazil) Maurício Gugelmin
Second	(New Zealand) Mike Thackwell
Third	(Colombia) Roberto Guerrero
- Overall Results
First	(Brazil) Maurício Gugelmin
Second	(New Zealand) Mike Thackwell
Third	(Netherlands) Jan Lammers

The 1985 Macau Grand Prix Formula Three was the 32nd Macau Grand Prix race to be held on the streets of Macau on 24 November 1985. It was the second edition for Formula Three cars. The race was won by Brazilian driver Mauricio Gugelmin, driving a Ralt RT30-Volkswagen.

== Entry list ==
Team	No	Driver	Vehicle	Engine
(British Hong Kong) Marlboro Theodore Racing w/ Eddie Jordan Racing	1	(New Zealand) Mike Thackwell	Ralt RT30	Volkswagen
(British Hong Kong) Marlboro Theodore Racing w/ Eddie Jordan Racing	2	(Italy) Emanuele Pirro	Ralt RT30	Volkswagen
(British Hong Kong) Marlboro Theodore Racing w/ West Surrey Racing	3	(Brazil) Maurício Gugelmin	Ralt RT30	Volkswagen
(United Kingdom) Viceroy David Price Racing	5	(United Kingdom) Martin Brundle	Reynard 853	Volkswagen
(United Kingdom) Viceroy David Price Racing	6	(Colombia) Roberto Guerrero	Reynard 853	Volkswagen
(United Kingdom) Viceroy David Price Racing	7	(United Kingdom) Johnny Dumfries	Reynard 853	Volkswagen
(United Kingdom) Watsons Water Intersport Racing	8	(Denmark) John Nielsen	Ralt RT30	Volkswagen
(United Kingdom) Watsons Water Intersport Racing	18	(Netherlands) Jan Lammers	Ralt RT30	Volkswagen
(United Kingdom) Murray Taylor Racing	9	(France) René Arnoux	Ralt RT30	Volkswagen
(Austria) Walter Funda Racing	10	(Austria) Jo Gartner	Ralt RT30	Volkswagen
(Japan) Nova Engineering	11	(United Kingdom) Kenny Acheson	Reynard 853	Toyota
(Germany) West Bertram Schäfer Racing	12	(Germany) Christian Danner	Ralt RT30	Volkswagen
(Germany) West Bertram Schäfer Racing	15	(Denmark) Kris Nissen	Ralt RT30	Volkswagen
(Belgium) Serge Saulnier	16	(Belgium) Didier Theys	Martini MK45	Alfa Romeo
(France) ORECA	17	(France) Pierre-Henri Raphanel	Martini MK45	Alfa Romeo
(Sweden) Chantaler Avia	19	(Sweden) Slim Borgudd	Ralt RT30	Volkswagen
(Italy) Forti Corse	21	(Switzerland) Franco Forini	Dallara 385	Volkswagen
(Italy) Forti Corse	22	(Spain) Adrián Campos	Dallara 385	Volkswagen
(Italy) Venturini Racing	23	(Italy) Fabrizio Barbazza	Dallara 385	Alfa Romeo
(Italy) Apicella Racing	25	(Italy) Marco Apicella	Dallara 385	Alfa Romeo
(Germany) Werner Schröder	26	(Germany) Volker Weidler	Ralt RT30	Volkswagen
(United Kingdom) Swallow Racing	27	(United Kingdom) Andy Wallace	Reynard 853	Volkswagen
(United Kingdom) Swallow Racing	28	(Austria) Franz Konrad	Reynard 853	Volkswagen
(Japan) Nissan Motorsport	29	(Japan) Hideshi Matsuda	Ralt RT30	Nissan
(Japan) Nissan Motorsport	32	(Japan) Aguri Suzuki	Ralt RT30	Nissan
(United Kingdom) Warmastyle Team	30	(United Kingdom) Russell Spence	Ralt RT30	Volkswagen
(United Kingdom) Madgwick Motorsport	31	(Sweden) Thomas Danielsson	Reynard 853	Volkswagen
(Japan) Team Kitamura	33	(Japan) Shuji Hyodo	Hayashi 330	Toyota
(United Kingdom) Mint Engineering	35	(United Kingdom) David Scott	Ralt RT30	Volkswagen
(United Kingdom) Valour Racing	66	(United States) Ross Cheever	Ralt RT30	Volkswagen

== Classification ==
=== Race ===
Pos.	No.	Driver	Team	Laps	Race Time
1	3	(Brazil) Maurício Gugelmin	Marlboro Theodore Racing w/ West Surrey Racing	27	1:05:17.080
2	1	(New Zealand) Mike Thackwell	Marlboro Theodore Racing w/ Eddie Jordan Racing	27	+9.530
3	18	(Netherlands) Jan Lammers	Watsons Water Intersport Racing	27	+19.670
4	6	(Colombia) Roberto Guerrero	David Price Racing	27	+22.700
5	8	(Denmark) John Nielsen	Intersport Racing	27	+28.360
6	9	(France) René Arnoux	Murray Taylor Racing	27	+52.400
7	26	(Germany) Volker Weidler	Werner Schröder	27	+52.930
8	27	(United Kingdom) Andy Wallace	Swallow Racing	27	+1:03.140
9	30	(United Kingdom) Russell Spence	Warmastyle Team	27	+1:06.450
10	10	(Austria) Jo Gartner	Walter Funda Racing	27	+1:33.730
11	19	(Sweden) Slim Borgudd	Chantaler Avia	27	+2:08.490
12	7	(United Kingdom) Johnny Dumfries	David Price Racing	25	+2 laps
13	33	(Japan) Shuji Hyodo	Team Kitamura	24	+3 laps
14	11	(United Kingdom) Kenny Acheson	Nova Engineering	24	+3 laps
15	28	(Austria) Franz Konrad	Swallow Racing	24	+3 laps
16	17	(France) Pierre-Henri Raphanel	ORECA	23	+4 laps
17	2	(Italy) Emanuele Pirro	Marlboro Theodore Racing w/ Eddie Jordan Racing	22	+5 laps
18	12	(Germany) Christian Danner	Bertram Schäfer Racing	21	+6 laps
19	35	(United Kingdom) Dave Scott	Mint Engineering	21	-
DNF	16	(Belgium) Didier Theys	Serge Saulnier	17	-
DNF	25	(Italy) Marco Apicella	Venturini Racing	15	-
DNF	32	(Japan) Aguri Suzuki	Nissan Motorsport	14	-
DNF	23	(Italy) Fabrizio Barbazza	Venturini Racing	13	-
DNF	22	(Spain) Adrián Campos	Forti Corse	12	-
DNF	66	(United States) Ross Cheever	Valour Racing	12	-
DNF	21	(Switzerland) Franco Forini	Forti Corse	2	-
DNF	15	(Denmark) Kris Nissen	Bertram Schäfer Racing	-	-
DNF	5	(United Kingdom) Martin Brundle	David Price Racing	-	-
DNF	31	(Sweden) Thomas Danielsson	Madgwick Motorsport	-	-
DNF	29	(Japan) Hideshi Matsuda	Nissan Motorsport	-	-
