= Jimmy Vasser =

American racecar driver and team owner (born 1965)

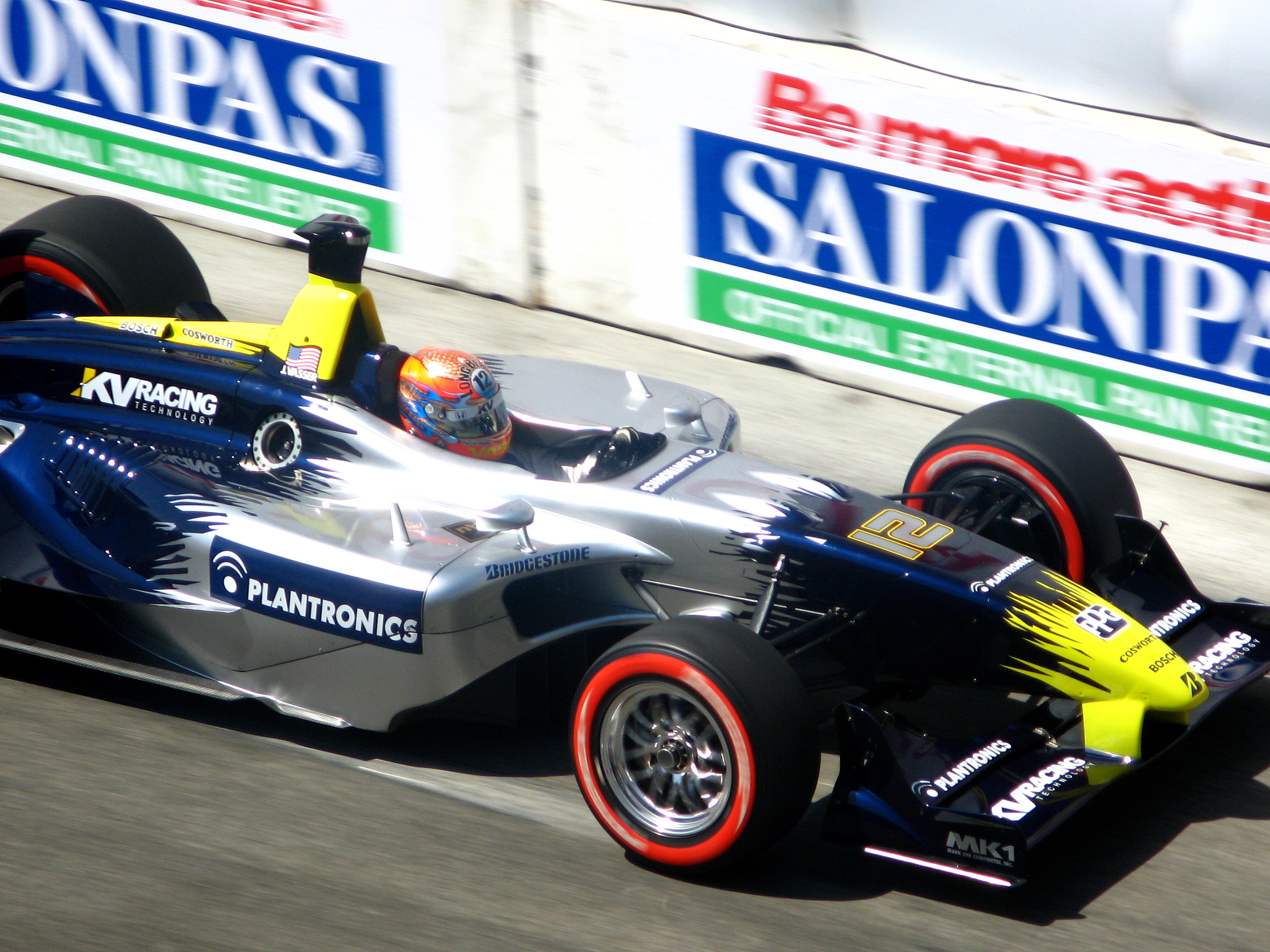
- Vasser at Long Beach, 2008
- Born: James Edward Vasser Jr. November 20, 1965 (age 60) Canoga Park, California, U.S.

Championship titles
- 1996 PPG Indy Car World Series Champion
Jimmy Vasser
Champ Car career
- 233 races run over 16 years
- Years active: 1992–2006, 2008
- Team(s): Hayhoe/Cole Racing (1992–1994); Target Chip Ganassi Racing (1995–2000); Patrick Racing (2001); Rahal Letterman Racing (2002); American Spirit Team Johansson (2003); PKV Racing (2004–2006); KV Racing (2008)
- Best finish: 1st (1996)
- First race: 1992 Dailkyo IndyCar Grand Prix (Surfers Paradise)
- Last race: 2008 Toyota Grand Prix of Long Beach (Long Beach)
- First win: 1996 Marlboro Grand Prix of Miami (Homestead)
- Last win: 2002 The 500 Presented by Toyota (California)
Wins	Podiums	Poles
10	33	8
NASCAR O'Reilly Auto Parts Series career
- 2 races run over 1 year
- Best finish: 97th (2003)
- First race: 2003 Koolerz 300 (Daytona)
- Last race: 2003 GNC Live Well 250 (Milwaukee)
Wins	Top tens	Poles
0	0	0

James Edward Vasser Jr. (born November 20, 1965) is an American former racing driver who competed primarily in the CART series and Champ Car. Vasser won ten CART series races and won the 1996 CART championship with Chip Ganassi Racing. Vasser was the last American to win the CART title. Vasser won the 1996 U.S. 500, and had a best finish of fourth at the Indianapolis 500 twice (1994 and 2001).

Vasser was co-owner of KV Racing Technology, winning the 2013 Indianapolis 500 with driver Tony Kanaan. He currently co-owns Vasser Sullivan Racing, claiming the GTD Pro teams title at the 2023 IMSA SportsCar Championship.

== Driving career ==
Vasser made his CART debut in 1992 and qualified for the Indianapolis 500, as the fastest rookie qualifier. While he become a top driver on the open-wheel circuit, his rise to prominence overlapped with the IRL-CART "Split". Vasser's best years were mostly spent away from the Indy 500, although he did race at Indy on a one-off basis a few times after the Split.

In 1995, Vasser joined Chip Ganassi Racing. At the Indianapolis 500 he was battling for the lead when he crashed with just thirty laps to go. Later in the season, Vasser finished second at both Detroit and Portland. But at Portland, race winner Al Unser Jr.'s car failed post-race inspection due to insufficient ground clearance. Unser was stripped of the victory, and Vasser was elevated to the winner, tentatively his first-career Indy car triumph. A protest and appeals process dragged out through the summer, and in September Unser was reinstated the win. Vasser would finish the 1995 season eighth in points.

In 1996, Vasser won the CART season opener at Homestead, officially his first win in Indy/Champ Car competition. He won four races, including the U.S. 500 at Michigan. He built a large points lead during the first half of the season, with seven top-tens in the first seven races. He clinched the championship at the season's final race, scoring points in every race except one.

Vasser finished third in points in 1997 with one race win. He finished second in points with three wins in 1998, including the Marlboro 500 at Fontana. But teammate Alex Zanardi would outshine him over those two seasons, winning the points championship both years. Vasser teamed with Juan Pablo Montoya in 1999. He was once again outperformed by his teammate and Montoya won the championship in his rookie season. In 2000, his last year with Chip Ganassi Racing, Vasser won the Houston Grand Prix for his first victory since 1998. In that year, Ganassi also became the first major CART major team to crossover to the IRL and compete at the Indianapolis 500. It was Vasser's first appearance at Indy since 1995. Vasser and Montoya were well-received by fans, and were quickly up to speed with the IRL regulars. Vasser led 5 laps, but slipped to 7th at the finish. Montoya dominated the race en route to victory.

For 2001, Vasser moved to the Patrick Racing team to drive the No. 40 Reynard Toyota. Despite having limited sponsorship for the car at first, Vasser started the season strong with four straight finishes of fourth to sixth place. Continuing the strong start to 2001, Vasser was reunited with Target Chip Ganassi Racing driving for them in the Indianapolis 500. Vasser ran well and finished in fourth place as CART drivers swept the top-five spots at the 500. However, once returning to the CART circuit, back to back crashes in race No. 5 at Milwaukee and race No. 6 at Detroit seemed to derail the season as Vasser finished the final sixteen races of the season with only four more finishes of fifth to seventh.

After a disappointing year without even a podium, Vasser was able to secure the seat of the No. 8 Shell Lola Ford with Rahal Letterman Racing for 2002 which had finished second in CART points the previous season. In the Shell car, Vasser showed some muscle at Long Beach scoring the pole, leading laps late, and finishing 2nd behind Michael Andretti. Vasser and Rahal Letterman also crossed over into the IRL where they ran the IRL race in Fontana to prepare for Indianapolis and then the Indianapolis 500. Success was limited as Vasser scored only a ninth at Fontana and a gearbox failure cut short his Indy 500 race. Vasser's 2002 season in the Shell car was much improved over the previous year with Patrick Racing. Vasser really finished the year strong with scoring points in each of the final nine races including a podium at Miami and a dominating win at Fontana after a late-race pass of Andretti. Vasser's Fontana win was to be the final win of his CART career.

Without sponsorship at Rahal for 2003, Vasser had to look for opportunities with other teams and without many seats available for the 38-year-old he ended up with Stefan Johansson's startup American Spirit team. The team was not fully funded and they ran the Reynard chassis which were not up to the pace of the current Lola chassis cars. Additionally, Reynard had gone bankrupt so further development of the chassis had to be taken on by the teams so the performance gap to the Lolas continue to widen during the season. Except for a couple of fourth-place finishes, leading fifteen laps at Cleveland, and podium at Surfer's Paradise in a wet/dry race the season was not very successful as rookie teammate Ryan Hunter-Reay was outpacing Vasser. Vasser reunited with Rahal Letterman for his final run at an Indianapolis 500 win but was again sidelined with gearbox failure during the race.

In 2004, Vasser became co-owner of PKV Racing (later renamed to KV Racing Technology) along with Dan Pettit and Kevin Kalkhoven and was a driver for the team. In 2004, he broke the modern CART–Champ Car record for the most consecutive starts. Vasser retired from open wheel racing in 2006, but remains active in his ownership role. He temporarily came out of retirement to drive in the final Champ Car World Series event at the 2008 Toyota Grand Prix of Long Beach.

In 2006, Vasser competed in three Grand-Am Rolex Sports Car Series races, including the 24 Hours of Daytona, driving for GAINSCO/Blackhawk Racing. In 2007, he again drove for the renamed GAINSCO/Bob Stallings Racing at the 24 Hours of Daytona, and on Sept. 4, 2007, it was announced that he would return to the team for the season-ending Sunchaser 1000 km. Vasser drove again for Stallings' team beginning at Laguna Seca in May 2008, pairing with fellow Champ Car champion Cristiano da Matta.

In 2013, Vasser joined the Stadium Super Trucks and was scheduled to make his debut at Honda Indy Toronto. However, he was injured prior to the race and was replaced by Davey Hamilton.

== Early career ==
- Won the 1986 Formula Ford National Championship, SCCA.
- Competed in the 1988 Corvette Challenge.
- Competed in the 1989 and 1990 Pro F-2000 Canadian Championship. Vasser and his teammate Ken Murillo were sponsored by Lucasfilm.
- Competed in Atlantic Championship in 1990 and 1991 for Genoa Racing / Della Penna Motorsports.
- Won the Formula Atlantic East/West Challenge in 1990.
- Finished Runner-up (by four points Jovy Marcelo) in the 1991 season, six wins and seven pole positions.

== Motorsports career results ==
=== SCCA National Championship Runoffs ===
Year	Track	Car	Engine	Class	Finish	Start	Status
1985	Road Atlanta	Swift DB1	Ford	Formula Ford	25	5	Running
1986	Road Atlanta	Swift DB1	Ford	Formula Ford	1	2	Running

=== American open-wheel racing results ===
(key)

==== Indy Lights ====
Year	Team	1	2	3	4	5	6	7	8	9	10	11	12	Rank	Points
1988	R & K Racing	PHX	MIL	POR	CLE	TOR	MEA; 10	POC	MDO	ROA	NAZ	LAG	MIA	**26th**	**3**
1989	Barclay Racing	PHX	LBH	MIL	DET	POR	MEA	TOR	POC	MDO	ROA	NAZ	LAG; 8	**24th**	**5**

==== CART/Champ Car ====
Year	Team	No.	Chassis	Engine	1	2	3	4	5	6	7	8	9	10	11	12	13	14	15	16	17	18	19	20	21	Rank	Points	Ref
1992	Hayhoe-Cole Racing	47	Lola T91/00	Chevrolet 265A	SRF; 15	PHX; 15	LBH; 7	INDY; 21	DET	POR; 23	MIL	NHA	TOR; 12	MCH	CLE; 14	ROA	VAN; 18	MDO; 25	NAZ; Wth	LAG; 12						22nd	**8**	
1993	Hayhoe-Cole Racing	18	Lola T92/00	Chevrolet 265A	SRF; 24	PHX; 3	LBH; 22		MIL; 8	DET; 16	POR; 11	CLE														16th	**30**	
1993	Hayhoe-Cole Racing	18	Lola T92/00	Ford XB V8t				INDY; 13					TOR; 11	MCH	NHA; 9	ROA	VAN; 18	MDO; 10	NAZ	LAG; 21						16th	**30**	
1994	Hayhoe-Cole Racing	18	Reynard 94i	Ford XB V8t	SRF; 4	PHX; 5	LBH; 24	INDY; 4	MIL; 11	DET; 20	POR; 32	CLE; 31	TOR; 25	MCH; 25	MDO; 14	NHA; 7	VAN; 15	ROA; 28	NAZ; 13	LAG; 26						15th	**42**	
1995	Chip Ganassi Racing	12	Reynard 95i	Ford XB V8t	MIA; 8	SRF; 24	PHX; 23	LBH; 23	NAZ; 24	INDY; 22	MIL; 9	DET; 2	POR; 2	ROA; 3	TOR; 17	CLE; 3	MCH; 7	MDO; 9	NHA; 6	VAN; 27	LAG; 8					8th	**92**	
1996	Chip Ganassi Racing	12	Reynard 96i	Honda HRH V8t	MIA; 1	RIO; 8	**SRF**; 1	LBH; 1	NAZ; 7	**500**; 1	MIL; 10	DET; 12	POR; 13	**CLE**; 10	TOR; 8	**MCH**; 9	MDO; 2	ROA; 6	VAN; 7	LAG; 4						1st	**154**	
1997	Chip Ganassi Racing	1	Reynard 97i	Honda HRR V8t	MIA; 3	SRF; 12	LBH; 9	NAZ; 5	RIO; 9	GAT; 5	MIL; 3	DET; 4	POR; 19	CLE; 13	TOR; 7	MCH; 24	MDO; 5	ROA; 8	VAN; 2	LAG; 1	FON; 2					3rd	**144**	
1998	Chip Ganassi Racing	12	Reynard 98i	Honda HRK V8t	MIA; 16	**MOT**; 7	LBH; 8	NAZ; 1	RIO; 6	GAT; 4	MIL; 1	DET; 6	POR; 8	**CLE**; 7	TOR; 3	MCH; 2	MDO; 27	ROA; 9	VAN; 26	LAG; 5	HOU; 4	SRF; 24	FON; 1			2nd	**169**	
1999	Chip Ganassi Racing	12	Reynard 99i	Honda HRS V8t	MIA; 4	MOT; 12	LBH; 10	NAZ; 11	RIO; 27	GAT; 10	MIL; 4	POR; 12	CLE; 23	ROA; 23	TOR; 8	**MCH**; 9	DET; 5	MDO; 4	CHI; 3	VAN; 3	LAG; 18	HOU; 20	SRF; 18	FON; 5		9th	**104**	
2000	Chip Ganassi Racing	12	Lola B2K/00	Toyota RVA V8t	MIA; 4	LBH; 3	RIO; 2	MOT; 21	NAZ; 7	MIL; 13	DET; 7	POR; 24	CLE; 8	TOR; 9	MCH; 21	CHI; 8	MDO; 21	ROA; 5	VAN; 6	LAG; 8	GAT; 7	HOU; 1	SRF; 3	FON; 22		6th	**131**	
2001	Patrick Racing	40	Reynard 01i	Toyota RV8F V8t	MTY; 6	LBH; 5	TXS; C	NAZ; 4	MOT; 5	MIL; 21	DET; 18	POR; 16	CLE; 5	TOR; 26	MCH; 23	CHI; 14	MDO; 23	ROA; 21	VAN; 19	LAU; 15	ROC; 7	HOU; 11	LAG; 5	SRF; 6	FON; 12	12th	**77**	
2002	Team Rahal	8	Lola B02/00	Ford XF V8t	MTY; 20	**LBH**; 2	MOT; 20	MIL; 9	LAG; 8	POR; 16	CHI; 17	TOR; 6	CLE; 6	VAN; 17	MDO; 8	ROA; 5	MTL; 5	DEN; 10	ROC; 7	MIA; 3	SRF; 12	FON; 1	MXC; 11			7th	**114**	
2003	American Spirit Team Johansson	12	Reynard 02i	Ford XFE V8t	STP; 6	MTY; 14	LBH; 4	BRH; 19	LAU; 8	MIL; 11	LAG; 8	POR; 7	CLE; 13	TOR; 13	VAN; 11	ROA; 9	MDO; 15	MTL; 16	DEN; 11	MIA; 4	MXC; 17	SRF; 3	FON; NH			11th	**72**	
2004	PKV Racing	12	Lola B02/00	Ford XFE V8t	LBH; 16	MTY; 12	MIL; 4	POR; 8	CLE; 5	TOR; 2	VAN; 10	ROA; 8	DEN; 17	MTL; 8	LAG; 17	LVG; 5	SRF; 12	MXC; 5								8th	**201**^	
2005	PKV Racing	12	Lola B02/00	Ford XFE V8t	LBH; 9	MTY; 14	**MIL**; 5	POR; 6	CLE; 6	TOR; 4	EDM; 11	SJO; 11	DEN; 15	MTL; 7	LVG; 3	SRF; 3	MXC; 6									6th	**217**	
2006	PKV Racing	12	Lola B03/00	Ford XFE V8t	LBH; 14	HOU	MTY	MIL	POR	CLE	TOR	EDM	SJO	DEN	MTL	ROA	SRF	MXC								24th	**7**	

- ^ New points system implemented in 2004

==== IndyCar ====
Year	Team	No.	Chassis	Engine	1	2	3	4	5	6	7	8	9	10	11	12	13	14	15	16	17	18	19	Rank	Points	Ref
2000	Target Chip Ganassi Racing	10	G-Force GF01C	Oldsmobile Aurora V8	WDW	PHX	LVS	INDY; 7	TXS	PPIR	ATL	KTY	TX2											32nd	26	
2001	Target Chip Ganassi Racing	44	G-Force GF05B	Oldsmobile Aurora V8	PHX	HMS	ATL	INDY; 4	TXS	PPIR	RIR	KAN	NSH	KTY	GAT	CHI	TX2							36th	32	
2002	Team Rahal	19	Dallara IR-02	Chevrolet Indy V8	HMS	PHX	FON; 9	NAZ	INDY; 30	TXS	PPIR	RIR	KAN	NSH	MCH	KTY	GAT	CHI	TX2					40th	23	
2003	Team Rahal	19	Dallara IR-03	Toyota V8	HMS	PHX	MOT	INDY; 26	TXS	PPIR	RIR	KAN	NSH	MCH	GAT	KTY	NAZ	CHI	FON	TX2				36th	4	
2008	KV Racing Technology	12	Panoz DP01	Ford XFE V8t	HMS	STP	MOT^{1} DNP	LBH^{1} 10	KAN	INDY	MIL	TXS	IOW	RIR	WGL	NSH	MDO	EDM	KTY	SNM	DET	CHI	SRF^{2}	42nd	0	

^{1} Run on same day.
^{2} Non-points-paying, exhibition race.

=== Indianapolis 500 results ===
Year	Chassis	Engine	Start	Finish	Reason out	Team
1992	Lola	Chevrolet	28th	21st	Crash	Hayhoe
1993	Lola	Ford-Cosworth	19th	13th	Running	Hayhoe
1994	Reynard	Ford-Cosworth	16th	4th	Running	Hayhoe
1995	Reynard	Ford-Cosworth	9th	22nd	Crash	Ganassi
2000	G-Force	Oldsmobile	7th	7th	Running	Ganassi
2001	G-Force	Oldsmobile	12th	4th	Running	Ganassi
2002	Dallara	Chevrolet	19th	30th	Gearbox	Rahal
2003	Dallara	Honda	27th	26th	Gearbox	Rahal

==== Notes ====
- Winner of fastest CART race: Fontana 2002, Average Speed: 197.995 mph (318.642 km/h)

=== NASCAR ===
(key) (Bold – Pole position awarded by qualifying time. Italics – Pole position earned by points standings or practice time. * – Most laps led.)

==== Busch Series ====
NASCAR Busch Series results
Year	Team	No.	Make	1	2	3	4	5	6	7	8	9	10	11	12	13	14	15	16	17	18	19	20	21	22	23	24	25	26	27	28	29	30	31	32	33	34	NBSC	Pts	Ref
2003	Braun Racing	30	Dodge	DAY; 28	CAR	LVS	DAR	BRI	TEX	TAL	NSH	CAL	RCH	GTY	NZH	CLT	DOV	NSH	KEN	MLW; 25	DAY	CHI	NHA	PPR	IRP	MCH	BRI	DAR	RCH	DOV	KAN	CLT	MEM	ATL	PHO	CAR	HOM	97th	167	

Sporting positions
Preceded by Jacques Villeneuve	CART Series; Champion; 1996	Succeeded by Alex Zanardi
