= Reynard 98I =

Racing car designed and built by Reynard Racing Cars

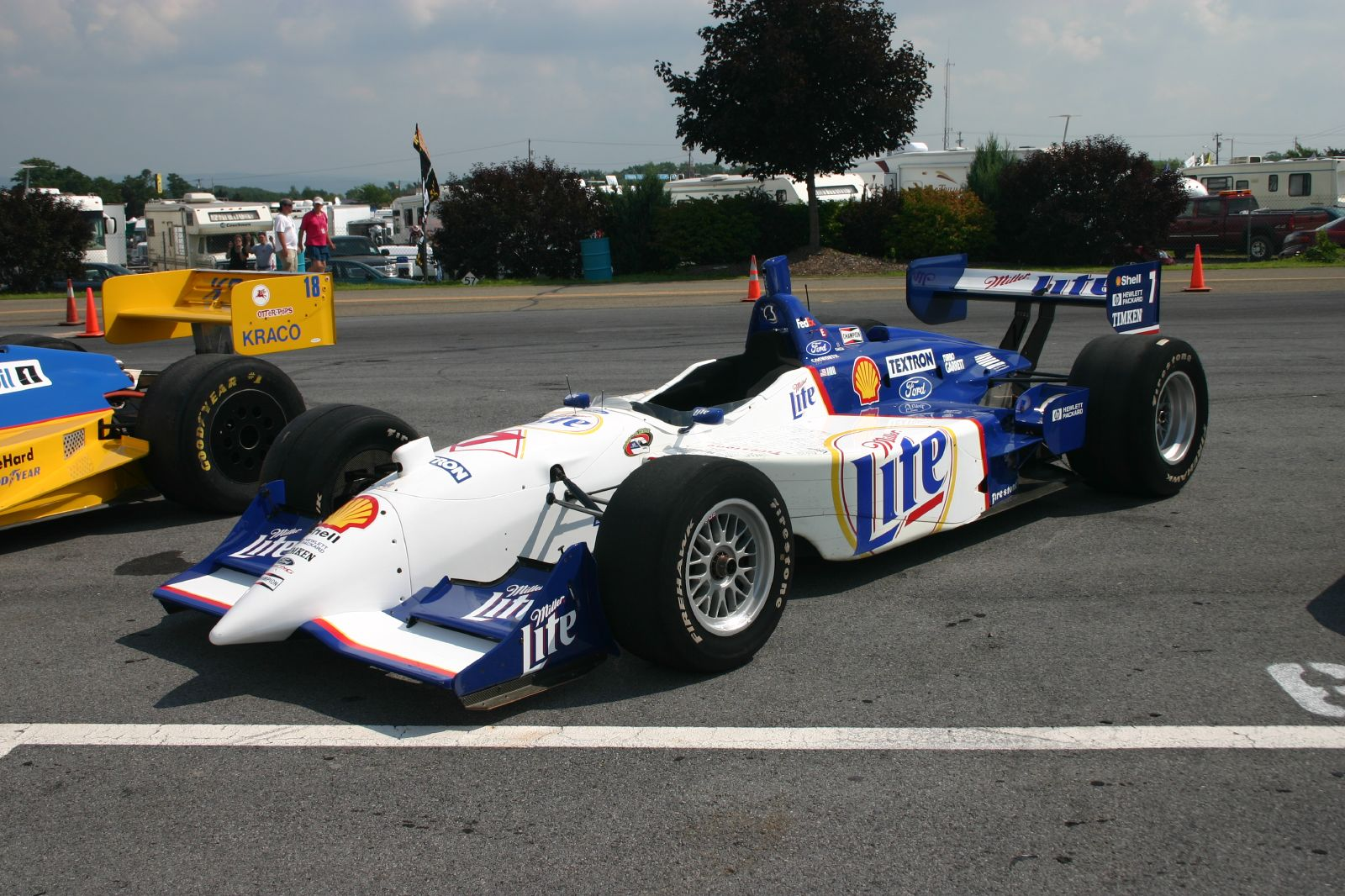
- Category: CART IndyCar
- Constructor: Reynard Racing Cars
- Predecessor: Reynard 97I
- Successor: Reynard 99I

Technical specifications
- Length: 190 in (4,826 mm)
- Width: 78–80 in (1,981–2,032 mm)
- Height: 37 in (940 mm)
- Axle track: 68 in (1,727 mm) (Front); 68 in (1,727 mm) (Rear)
- Wheelbase: 116 in (2,946 mm)
- Engine: Honda Indy V8 turbo Mercedes-Benz IC108; Toyota RV8C; Ford/Cosworth XB 2.65 L (2,650 cc; 162 cu in) V8 mid-engined
- Transmission: 6-speed sequential manual
- Power: 850–900 hp (630–670 kW)
- Weight: 1,550 lb (700 kg)
- Fuel: Methanol
- Tyres: Firestone; Goodyear Eagle

Competition history
- Debut: 1998 Marlboro Grand Prix of Miami; Miami, Florida

The Reynard 98I is an open-wheel racing car designed and built by Reynard Racing Cars that competed in the 1998 IndyCar season. It won the constructors' and drivers' titles later that year, being driven by Alex Zanardi.
