= Leyton House CG901 =

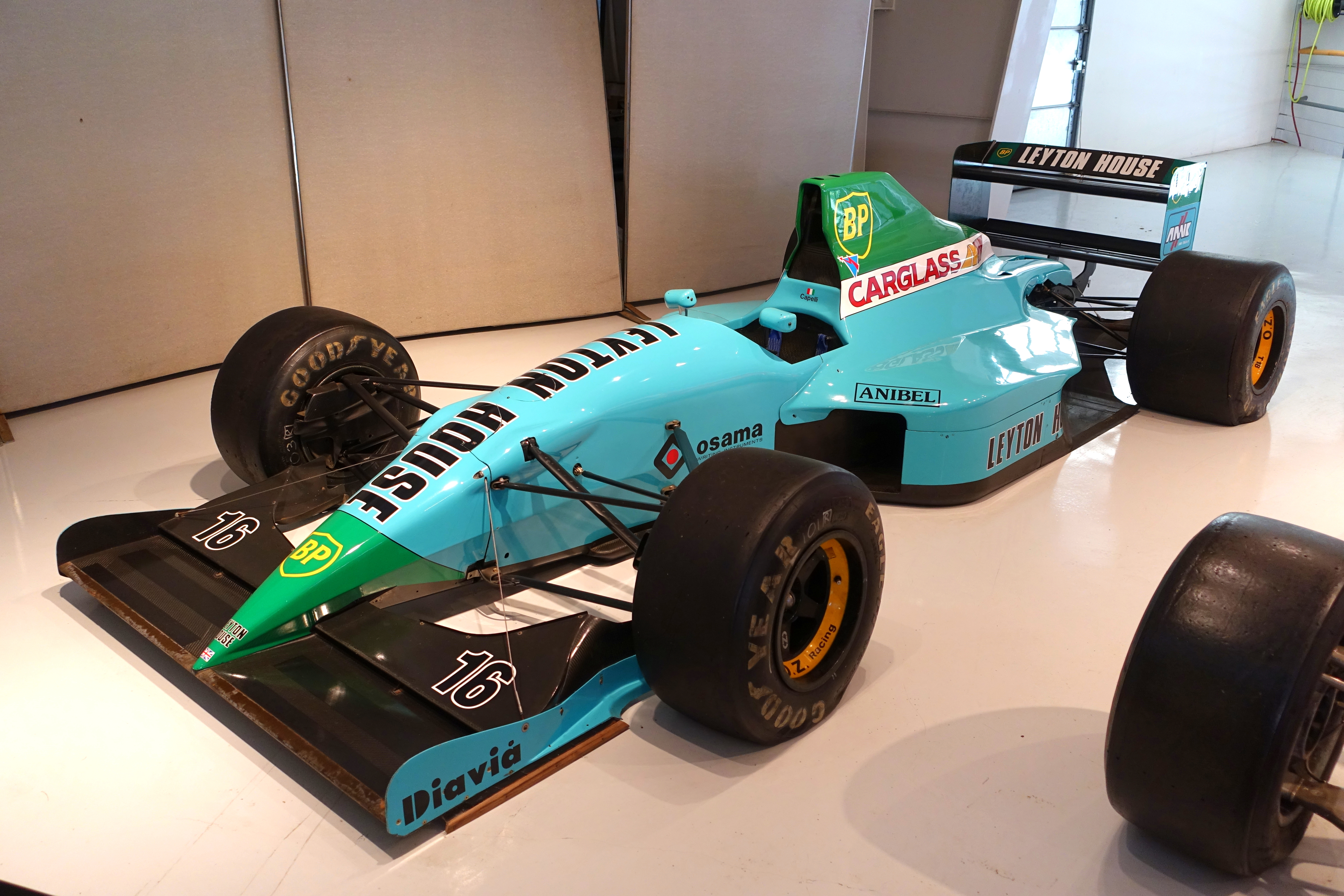
- Category: Formula One
- Constructor: Leyton House Racing
- Designer: Adrian Newey
- Predecessor: March CG891
- Successor: Leyton House CG911

Technical specifications
- Chassis: Carbon fibre monocoque
- Suspension (front): Double wishbones, push-rod and rocker actuated coil springs over dampers, anti-roll bar
- Suspension (rear): Double wishbones, push-rod and rocker actuated coil springs over dampers, anti-roll bar
- Engine: Judd EV, 3,496 cc (213.3 cu in), 76° V8, NA mid-engine, longitudinally mounted
- Transmission: March 6 speed manual
- Fuel: BP
- Tyres: Goodyear

Competition history
- Notable entrants: Leyton House Racing
- Notable drivers: 15. (Brazil) Maurício Gugelmin; 16. (Italy) Ivan Capelli
- Debut: 1990 San Marino Grand Prix
Races	Wins	Poles	F/Laps
14	0	0	0
- Constructors' Championships: 0
- Drivers' Championships: 0

The Leyton House CG901 was a Formula One racing car designed by Adrian Newey for the 1990 Formula One World Championship. Five chassis were built and were powered by the Judd EV 3.5 litre V8 engine. Chassis 001 was subsequently modified mid-season to accommodate the Ilmor 2175A engine the team used in 1991. The drivers for 1990 were the highly rated Ivan Capelli and Maurício Gugelmin. The CG in the name stood for Cesare Gariboldi, a March Leyton team manager who was killed in a road accident in 1989.

== Design ==
The CG901 appeared in two distinct specifications, the early season A spec and the mid to late season B spec. The change was largely an aerodynamic update to correct design errors incurred as a result of erroneous data from the team's wind tunnel. The basis for the car was an evolution of the CG891 of 1989 but with even less compromise from an aerodynamic stand point. This approach caused the car to be extremely sensitive to pitch and roll necessitating a very stiff set-up.

The "tub" is a monocoque type of carbon fibre construction encapsulating the driver, front suspension dampers and fuel cell. The cockpit area was reputed to be very small and cramped, in fact on the lower portion of the tub two external blisters are visible to allow the driver's heels to fit into the narrow space. The dampers were located in front of the driver's feet and were of 2 way adjustable Koni type. The dampers were actuated via rockers by pushrods from the front uprights. The detachable nose section incorporates the front wing which was bolted from the underside and sat proud of the nose itself.

The engine is attached to the tub via studs and nuts and acted as a fully stressed member. The cooling system was configured in a similar manner to that of the Indycars Newey had designed prior to his involvement with Formula One. The water system is composed of two large coolers that fed through a water oil heat exchanger in the right hand sidepod.

The gearbox was attached to the engine through a bell housing that formed the lower part of the engine oil tank, the upper part being a sculpted carbon fibre affair. Of six speed longitudinal configuration the gearbox differed to most conventional layouts in that the selector mechanism was located at the front of the assembly. The rear suspension like the front utilised pushrods compressing the horizontally mounted Koni dampers via rockers.

The most striking feature of the CG901 was its aerodynamics, it was if nothing else a very beautiful car. The B specification update included a new design of floor building on the established practice of an exhaust fed diffuser. The engine cover was extremely small and very narrow following the curves of the tub.

The electronics package was principally supplied by Zytek Engineering however the car did utilize a Marelli ignition package for at least part of the season.

== Racing history ==
The performance of the CG901 was very poor before the introduction of the B specification car at the French Grand Prix of 1990. In both France and Britain both Capelli and Gugelmin showed dominant form bewildering their much better-funded rivals. For the remainder of the season performance remained patchy and was plagued with reliability problems.

== Complete Formula One results ==
(key)

Year	Team	Engine	Tyres	Drivers	1	2	3	4	5	6	7	8	9	10	11	12	13	14	15	16	Pts.	WCC
1990	Leyton House Racing	Judd EV; V8	G		USA	BRA	SMR	MON	CAN	MEX	FRA	GBR	GER	HUN	BEL	ITA	POR	ESP	JPN	AUS	7	7th
1990	Leyton House Racing	Judd EV; V8	G	Maurício Gugelmin	14	DNQ	Ret	DNQ	DNQ	DNQ	Ret	DNS	Ret	8	6	Ret	12	8	Ret	Ret	7	7th
1990	Leyton House Racing	Judd EV; V8	G	Ivan Capelli	Ret	DNQ	Ret	Ret	10	DNQ	2	Ret	7	Ret	7	Ret	Ret	Ret	Ret	Ret	7	7th
