= Maurício Gugelmin =

Brazilian racing driver (born 1963)

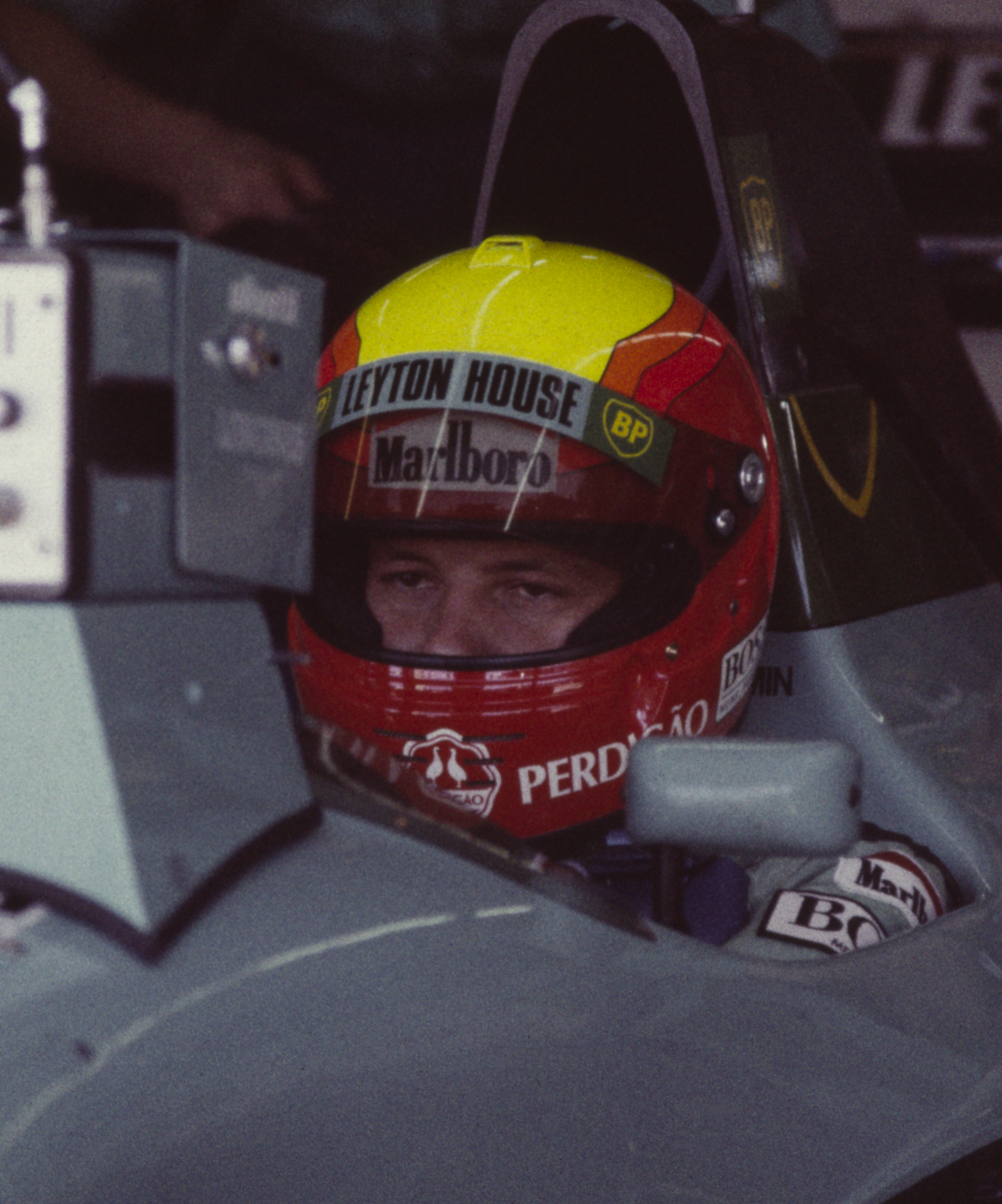
- Gugelmin at the 1991 United States Grand Prix
- Born: 20 April 1963 (age 63); Joinville, Santa Catarina, Brazil
- Spouse: Stella Maris
- Children: 3

Formula One World Championship career
- Nationality: (Brazil) Brazilian
- Active years: 1988–1992
- Team(s): March, Leyton House, Jordan
- Entries: 80 (74 starts)
- Championships: 0
- Wins: 0
- Podiums: 1
- Career points: 10
- Pole positions: 0
- Fastest laps: 1
- First entry: 1988 Brazilian Grand Prix
- Last entry: 1992 Australian Grand Prix

Champ Car career
- 147 races run over 8 years
- Years active: 1993–2001
- Teams: Dick Simon, CGR, PacWest
- Best finish: 4th (1997)
- First race: 1993 Pioneer Electronics 200 (Mid-Ohio)
- Last race: 2001 Marlboro 500 (Fontana)
- First win: 1997 Molson Indy Vancouver (Vancouver)
Wins	Podiums	Poles
1	8	2

Maurício Gugelmin (born 20 April 1963) is a Brazilian former racing driver and businessman, who competed in Formula One from 1988 to 1992, and CART from 1993 to 2001.

Born and raised in Joinville, Gugelmin began competitive kart racing aged seven, winning several regional and national titles. He progressed to Formula Ford in 1982, dominating the British and European championships. Gugelmin then won the 1985 British Formula Three Championship, further winning the Macau Grand Prix to emulate Ayrton Senna two years prior. Gugelmin signed for March in 1988, making his Formula One debut at his home Grand Prix in Brazil. In his rookie season, he scored points finishes at the British and Hungarian Grands Prix, driving the Adrian Newey-designed 881. Retaining his seat for 1989, Gugelmin achieved his only career podium finish at the season-opening Brazilian Grand Prix. After two further seasons at the re-branded Leyton House—including a non-classified championship finish in 1991—Gugelmin moved to Jordan for his 1992 campaign, but was unable to score points again and departed at the end of the season.

After exiting Formula One, Gugelmin competed in CART IndyCar from 1993 to 2001. Across 147 races, Gugelmin achieved eight podiums, including one victory at the Molson Indy Vancouver in 1997, finishing a career-best fourth in the standings that year. His best result at the Indianapolis 500 came in 1995, where he finished sixth after leading 59 laps. For a period, he held the world speed record for a closed race track, set at California Speedway in 1997 at a speed of 240.942 mph (387.759 km/h). Gugelmin retired from motor racing at the end of 2001 following the death of his son.

== Personal and early life ==
Gugelmin was born to a wealthy family in Joinville, Brazil on 20 April 1963. His father is a timber merchant and a collector of antique cars. Gugelmin is married to Stella Maris, and they have two sons, Bernardo and Gabriel. Their third son, Giuliano, who was Bernardo's twin, died from cerebral palsy in April 2001 at the age of six.

== Career ==
=== Before Formula One ===
Gugelmin started racing go-karts as a child in Brazil in 1971, winning his local championship nine years in a row from 1971 to 1979. He progressed to the Brazilian national championship in 1980, which he also won. He progressed to single-seater racing cars in 1981, when he won the Brazilian Formula Fiat Championship.

In 1982, Gugelmin, like many Brazilian drivers of his generation, moved to the United Kingdom to further his racing career. He was a longtime friend of future Formula One world champion Ayrton Senna, who was already racing in the country, and the two shared a house from 1982 to 1987. Senna, having previously been a Formula Ford driver with the Van Diemen team, used his influence within the organisation to secure Gugelmin a race seat with them for 1982. By the end of the year, Gugelmin was the British Formula Ford 1600 cc champion with 13 race wins and 90 points scored. He followed this up by finishing as runner-up in the British Formula Ford 2000 cc series the following year. He moved to the European Formula Ford series in 1984, and won the title at his first attempt. A progression to Formula Three followed in 1985 with West Surrey Racing, winning the British championship and the season-ending Macau Grand Prix. Gugelmin subsequently spent two years in International Formula 3000 (F3000), the final step before Formula One, competing with sponsorship backing for the 1986 season. He took one victory in F3000, at Silverstone in 1987 while driving for the Ralt factory team.

=== Formula One ===
Gugelmin entered Formula One, the highest category of circuit racing defined by the Fédération Internationale de l'Automobile (FIA), motorsport's world governing body, with the March team in the 1988 season, as team-mate to Ivan Capelli. He had previously been in contention for a drive with Lotus in the 1986 championship at the request of his friend Ayrton Senna, however the British team could not promote two Brazilian drivers and he was overlooked in favour of Johnny Dumfries. Gugelmin began the season with five retirements from the first six races due to mechanical failure, but soon afterwards he took his first points scoring finish with fourth place at the British Grand Prix. Gugelmin scored points in one other race with a fifth-place finish at the Hungarian Grand Prix. He finished the season as the highest-scoring newcomer in the Formula One World Championship, ending the year in 13th position overall.

The 1989 championship was barren for the March team, and Gugelmin took their only points scoring finish of the year at the Brazilian Grand Prix. He finished in third position; an excellent result given that March were financially troubled. At the French Grand Prix, Gugelmin was involved in a large accident at the start of the race which resulted in a spectacular barrel roll. A photograph of the accident was later selected for a London Exhibition as one of Formula One's most striking photographs. The race was stopped as a result; Gugelmin took the restart from the pit lane and set the race's fastest lap, the only one of his F1 career.

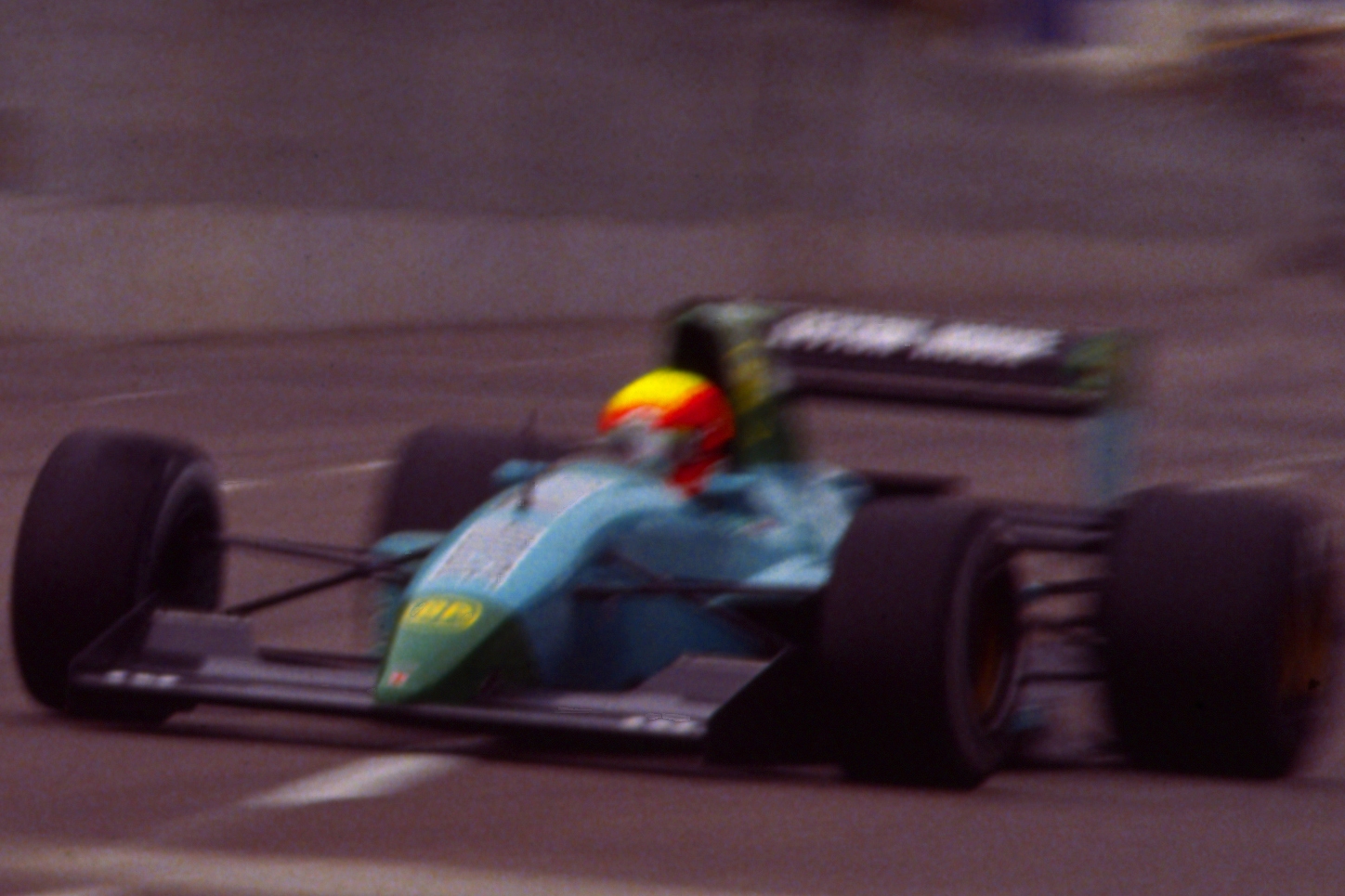
Gugelmin at the 1991 US Grand Prix.

In 1990, the March team was sold, and became known as Leyton House. Gugelmin was once again partnered by Capelli, but the team's CG901 chassis proved troublesome, and between them they failed to qualify six times during the season, including at the Mexican Grand Prix. However, at the next race, the French Grand Prix, modifications had been made to the car, which improved the performance. Running the whole race without changing their tyres, Capelli and Gugelmin ran first and second during the race. Gugelmin retired from fourth position mid-race with engine problems but he went on to score a single point for finishing in sixth place in the Belgian Grand Prix later in the season.

The 1991 championship saw internal turmoil at the team with several key staff leaving. The car lacked pace and both Gugelmin and Capelli struggled; the team scored just one point all season. Gugelmin's best result amounted to three seventh-place finishes, although he retired from eight of the season's sixteen races. In September, the team's principal, Akira Akagi, was arrested on suspicion of fraud. Money was tight, and Gugelmin made the decision to leave the team at the end of the year. A switch to the Jordan team for the 1992 season did not improve Gugelmin's fortunes. The team struggled with financial difficulties and scored only one point all year. The team's Yamaha engine was underpowered, and the car was unreliable. Gugelmin failed to finish eleven out of the sixteen races, and scored no points.

=== Champ Car ===
Gugelmin signed with Dick Simon Racing to take part in the North American Championship Auto Racing Teams (CART) racing series for the last three races of 1993. Although races at Mid Ohio and Nazareth resulted in non-finishes, Gugelmin finished 13th at Laguna Seca although this was not high enough to receive any points. Despite this, Gugelmin demonstrated promise. In the 1994 season, Gugelmin signed with Chip Ganassi Racing to partner Michael Andretti who returned to the series after a season in Formula One. Andretti was more successful than Gugelmin, and took two wins, including Reynard's first win in Champ Car at Surfers Paradise. Gugelmin was hindered by a lack of cooperation between his and Andretti's crews, and his first full-time year in the Champ Car World Series resulted in seven points finishes and 16th in the points standings.

The 1995 season commenced with Gugelmin finishing in second place to Jacques Villeneuve in the first round of the year at Miami. He went on to finish in sixth position at the Indianapolis 500 after leading the most laps of any driver. Eight additional points finishes, including a third place at the final round at Laguna Seca, meant he finished tenth in the final drivers' points standings, nine positions ahead of his experienced teammate and former series champion Danny Sullivan.

For the 1996 championship, Gugelmin was partnered at PacWest by the British driver Mark Blundell. He established a reputation for being quick at superspeedway tracks after taking a second and a third place at the two events at Michigan International Speedway. On top of this he took four other points finishes, finishing the season in 14th place. For the 1997 season, Gugelmin had lost 40 lb (18 kg) under a fitness programme, and the PacWest team switched to using Firestone tyres and Mercedes-Benz engines. The package was competitive throughout the year and Gugelmin and Blundell finished fourth and sixth in the championship respectively. Gugelmin's notable races of the year include the Detroit Indy Grand Prix, where Gugelmin was leading the race on the last lap when he ran out of fuel, and the Molson Indy Vancouver, where Gugelmin won his first Champ Car race. One of the most popular men in the championship, virtually the entire pit-lane was full of happiness for him. In qualifying for the final race of the season at the California Speedway, Gugelmin set a world record for the fastest ever lap of a closed race track at 240.942 mph (387.759 km/h). This record stood until 2000 when Gil de Ferran surpassed it with a lap of 241.428 mph (388.541 km/h), also at California Speedway. Gugelmin went on to finish the race in fourth place.

The 1998 championship proved not to be as successful. Setbacks plagued the team and they struggled to get to grips with the new chassis. Gugelmin showed determination, and scored nine points-scoring finishes. A highlight was Gugelmin leading 40 laps during the final event at California Speedway, en route to finishing in fifth place. Gugelmin was unable to reproduce his race-winning form, and finished no higher than 15th position in the final points standings over the next three years. In the 2000 season, Gugelmin was named as the chairman of the Championship Drivers Association, the organisation set up to represent the interests of the drivers in the CART series. That year, his best finish was a second place at Nazareth Speedway and was 17th in the points standings.

The 2001 season saw PacWest switch engine manufacturers from Mercedes to Toyota and Gugelmin would be partnered by Indy Lights champion Scott Dixon. During the practice session for the race at Texas Motor Speedway, Gugelmin crashed after he lost control in the second turn and hit the wall with the acceleration peaked at 66.2 g, before a second impact with the wall where acceleration peaked at 113.1 g. The event was eventually cancelled after drivers complained of dizziness, nausea and blurred vision, which were caused by the high g-forces experienced when driving at speed on the track. During the week before the race at Nazareth Speedway, Gugelmin's son, Giuliano, died from respiratory complications. Giuliano was quadriplegic and a lifelong sufferer from cerebral palsy owing to complications at birth. As a result, he did not take part in the race after PacWest Racing withdrew his entry as a mark of respect. He qualified on pole position for the Grand Prix of Cleveland later in the season. At the end of 2001, Gugelmin decided to retire from the sport, stating "I definitely want to spend more time with my family. After those two big accidents, and Alex [Zanardi]'s deal in Germany, I said, 'That's it. Forget it.' "

=== After Champ Car ===
In 2003, Gugelmin was announced as a competitor by the organizers of the new Renault Megane Super Cup in his native Brazil. However, the series did not launch and since then Gugelmin has made no competitive appearances in motorsport. Following his retirement, Gugelmin put his Florida mansion in Coral Gables up for sale for $17 million, and moved back to live in Brazil full-time. He runs the family business along with his brother, Alceu, and has also done consultancy work for Mercedes-Benz subsidiary AMG. Both his surviving sons compete in go-kart events.

== Racing record ==
=== Career summary ===
Season	Series	Team	Races	Wins	Poles	F/Laps	Podiums	Points	Position
1982	Formula Ford 1600	Van Diemen	22	13	8	8	16	?	**1st**
1983	Formula Ford 2000	Van Diemen	23	6	6	6	12	?	**2nd**
1984	Formula Ford 2000 Europe	Rushen Green	24	3	6	6	12	128	**1st**
1985	British Formula Three	West Surrey Racing	18	3	5	9	12	84	**1st**
1985	Macau Grand Prix	West Surrey Racing w/ Theodore Racing	1	1	1	0	1	N/A	**1st**
1986	International Formula 3000	West Surrey Racing	9	0	0	0	0	4	13th
1987	International Formula 3000	Team Ralt	11	1	2	0	5	29	4th
1988	Formula One	Leyton House March Racing Team	16	0	0	0	0	5	13th
1989	Formula One	Leyton House Racing	15	0	0	1	1	4	16th
1990	Formula One	Leyton House	11	0	0	0	0	1	18th
1991	Formula One	Leyton House	16	0	0	0	0	0	NC
1992	Formula One	Sasol Jordan Yamaha	16	0	0	0	0	0	NC
1993	PPG Indy Car World Series	Dick Simon Racing	3	0	0	0	0	0	NC
1994	PPG Indy Car World Series	Chip Ganassi Racing	16	0	0	0	0	39	16th
1995	PPG Indy Car World Series	PacWest Racing	17	0	0	0	2	80	10th
1996	PPG Indy Car World Series	PacWest Racing	16	0	0	0	2	53	14th
1997	CART PPG World Series	PacWest Racing	17	1	3	0	3	132	4th
1998	CART FedEx Championship Series	PacWest Racing	19	0	0	0	0	49	15th
1999	CART FedEx Championship Series	PacWest Racing	20	0	0	0	0	44	16th
2000	CART FedEx Championship Series	PacWest Racing	20	0	0	0	1	39	17th
2001	CART FedEx Championship Series	PacWest Racing	19	0	1	0	0	17	24th

=== Complete British Formula Three Championship results ===
(key) (Races in bold indicate pole position; races in italics indicate fastest lap; small number denotes finishing position.)

Year	Entrant	1	2	3	4	5	6	7	8	9	10	11	12	13	14	15	16	17	18	Pos.	Pts
1985	West Surrey Racing	SIL; 3	THU; 3	SIL; 3	THU; 4	DON; 2	ZOL; 4	**THU**; 7	THU; Ret	**SIL**; 1	BRH; 3	**SIL**; 3	**DON**; 3	SNE; 2	OUL; 2	SIL; 5	SPA; 7	ZAN; 1	**SIL**; 1	**1st**	**84**

=== Complete Macau Grand Prix results ===
Year	Team	Chassis/Engine	Qualifying	Race1	Race2	Overall ranking	Ref
1985	(United Kingdom) West Surrey Racing w/ Theodore Racing	Ralt・Toyota	1st	**1**	**1**	**1st**	

=== Complete International Formula 3000 results ===
(key) (Races in bold indicate pole position; races in italics indicate fastest lap; small number denotes finishing position.)

Year	Entrant	Chassis	Engine	1	2	3	4	5	6	7	8	9	10	11	Pos.	Pts
1986	West Surrey Racing	March 86B	Cosworth V8	SIL; 14	VAL; 4	PAU; DNS	SPA; 7	IMO; Ret	MUG; DNQ	PER; Ret	ÖST; 8	BIR; 14	BUG; 9	JAR; 6	13th	4
1987	Team Ralt	Ralt RT21	Honda V8	SIL; 1	VAL; 3	SPA; Ret	PAU; Ret	DON; Ret	**PER**; Ret	BRH; 2	**BIR**; 3	IMO; 7	BUG; 10	JAR; 2	4th	29

=== Complete Formula One results ===
(key) (Races in bold indicate pole position, races in italics indicate fastest lap; small number indicates finishing position)

Year	Entrant	Chassis	Engine	1	2	3	4	5	6	7	8	9	10	11	12	13	14	15	16	WDC	Pts
1988	Leyton House March Racing Team	March 881	Judd CV 3.5 V8	BRA; Ret	SMR; 15	MON; Ret	MEX; Ret	CAN; Ret	DET; Ret	FRA; 8	GBR; 4	GER; 8	HUN; 5	BEL; Ret	ITA; 8	POR; Ret	ESP; 7	JPN; 10	AUS; Ret	13th	5
1989	Leyton House Racing	March 881	Judd CV 3.5 V8	BRA; 3	SMR; Ret															16th	4
1989	Leyton House Racing	March CG891	Judd EV 3.5 V8			MON; Ret	MEX; DNQ	USA; DSQ	CAN; Ret	FRA; NC	GBR; Ret	GER; Ret	HUN; Ret	BEL; 7	ITA; Ret	POR; 10	ESP; Ret	JPN; 7	AUS; 7	16th	4
1990	Leyton House	Leyton House CG901	Judd EV 3.5 V8	USA; 14	BRA; DNQ	SMR; Ret	MON; DNQ	CAN; DNQ	MEX; DNQ	FRA; Ret	GBR; DNS	GER; Ret	HUN; 8	BEL; 6	ITA; Ret	POR; 12	ESP; 8	JPN; Ret	AUS; Ret	18th	1
1991	Leyton House	Leyton House CG911	Ilmor 2175A 3.5 V10	USA; Ret	BRA; Ret	SMR; 12	MON; Ret	CAN; Ret	MEX; Ret	FRA; 7	GBR; Ret	GER; Ret	HUN; 11	BEL; Ret	ITA; 15	POR; 7	ESP; 7	JPN; 8	AUS; 14	NC	0
1992	Sasol Jordan Yamaha	Jordan 192	Yamaha OX99 3.5 V12	RSA; 11	MEX; Ret	BRA; Ret	ESP; Ret	SMR; 7	MON; Ret	CAN; Ret	FRA; Ret	GBR; Ret	GER; 15	HUN; 10	BEL; 14	ITA; Ret	POR; Ret	JPN; Ret	AUS; Ret	NC	0

=== American open-wheel racing results ===
(key) (Races in bold indicate pole position; small number denotes finishing position)

==== CART ====
Year	Team	No.	Chassis	Engine	1	2	3	4	5	6	7	8	9	10	11	12	13	14	15	16	17	18	19	20	21	Rank	Points	Ref
1993	Dick Simon Racing	90	Lola T93/00	Ford XB V8t	SRF	PHX	LBH	INDY	MIL	DET	POR	CLE	TOR	MIC	NHM	ROA	VAN	MID; 21	NZR; 24	LAG; 13						-	0	
1994	Chip Ganassi Racing	88	Reynard 94I	Ford XB V8t	SRF; 6	PHX; 15	LBH; 7	INDY; 11	MIL; 15	DET; 8	POR; 30	CLE; 8	TOR; 20	MIC; 15	MID; 25	NHS; 14	VAN; 5	ROA; 19	NZR; 10	LAG; 22						**16th**	**39**	
1995	PacWest Racing	18	Reynard 95I	Ford XB V8t	MIA; 2	SRF; 4	PHX; 13	LBH; 5	NZR; 17	INDY; 6	MIL; 14	DET; 15	POR; 7	ROA; 24	TOR; 12	CLE; 23	MIC; 11	MID; 6	NHS; 11	VAN; 20	LAG; 3					**10th**	**80**	
1996	PacWest Racing	17	Reynard 96I	Ford XB V8t	MIA; 26	RIO; 25	SRF; 4	LBH; 15	NZR; 15	MIC; 2	MIL; 15	DET; 16	POR; 16	CLE; 21	TOR; 12	MIC; 3	ROA; 26	MID; 21	VAN; 24	LAG; 5						**14th**	**53**	
1997	PacWest Racing	17	Reynard 97I	Mercedes-Benz IC108D V8t	MIA; 6	SRF; 17	LBH; 2	NZR; 9	**RIO**; 22	GAT; 6	MIL; 5	DET; 16	POR; 6	CLE; 15	TOR; 6	MIC; 6	MID; 7	**ROA**; 2	VAN; 1	LAG; 9	**FON**; 4					**4th**	**132**	
1998	PacWest Racing	17	Reynard 97I	Mercedes-Benz IC108D V8t	MIA; 10	MOT; 20	LBH; 10																			**15th**	**49**	
1998	PacWest Racing	17	Reynard 98I	Mercedes-Benz IC108E V8t				NZR; 17	RIO; 9	GAT; 16	MIL; 21	DET; 19	POR; 7	CLE; 20	TOR; 12	MIC; 13	MID; 4	ROA; 19	VAN; 6	LAG; 27	HOU; 18	SRF; 12	FON; 5			**15th**	**49**	
1999	PacWest Racing	17	Reynard 99I	Mercedes-Benz IC108E V8t	MIA; 11	MOT; 7	LBH; 14	NZR; 18	RIO; 22	GAT; 18	MIL; 8	POR; 25	CLE; 21	ROA; 12	TOR; 14	MIC; 22	DET; 24	MID; 20	CHI; 19	VAN; 4	LAG; 11	HOU; 6	SRF; 26	FON; 6		**16th**	**44**	
2000	PacWest Racing	17	Reynard 2KI	Mercedes-Benz IC108F V8t	MIA; 16	LBH; 10	RIO; 21	MOT; 22	NZR; 2	MIL; 11	DET; 16	POR; 19	CLE; 10	TOR; 15	MIC; 13	CHI; 7	MID; 20	ROA; 17	VAN; 21	LAG; 7	GAT; 19	HOU; 23	SRF; 10	FON; 17		**17th**	**39**	
2001	PacWest Racing	17	Reynard 01I	Toyota RV8F V8t	MON; 15	LBH; 22	TEX; C	NZR; DNP	MOT; 12	MIL; 10	DET; 10	POR; 20	**CLE**; 10	TOR; 7	MIC; 15	CHI; 22	MID; 14	ROA; 23	VAN; 15	LAU; 16	ROC; 20	HOU; 20	LAG; 16	SRF; 24	FON; 20	**24th**	**17**	

==== Indianapolis 500 ====
Year	Chassis	Engine	Start	Finish	Team
1994	Reynard 94I	Ford XB V8t	28	11	Chip Ganassi Racing
1995	Reynard 95I	Ford XB V8t	6	6	PacWest Racing

Sporting positions
Preceded by Johnny Dumfries	British Formula Three Champion; 1985	Succeeded by Andy Wallace
Preceded by John Nielsen	Macau Grand Prix winner 1985	Succeeded by Andy Wallace
