= NGC 901 =

Elliptical galaxy in the constellation Aries

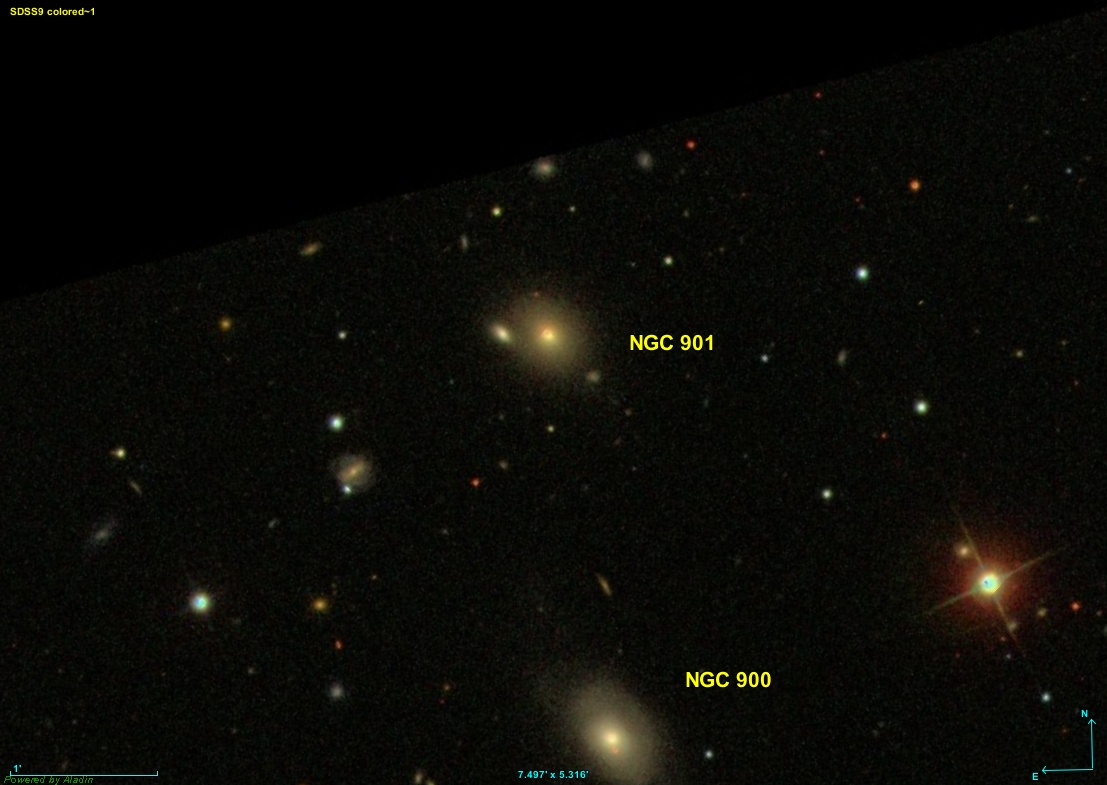
- SDSS image of NGC 901

Observation data (J2000 epoch)
- Constellation: Aries
- Right ascension: 02^{h} 23^{m} 34.09^{s}
- Declination: +26° 33′ 25.4″
- Redshift: 0.0326
- Heliocentric radial velocity: 9774 km/s
- Distance: 458.6 ± 32.1 Mly (140.60 ± 9.85 Mpc)
- Apparent magnitude (B): 15.66

Characteristics
- Type: E

Other designations
- PGC 212967

NGC 901 is an elliptical galaxy in the constellation Aries. It is estimated to be 441 million light years from the Milky Way and has a diameter of approximately 50,000 ly. NGC 901 was discovered on September 5, 1864, by Albert Marth.

== See also ==
- List of NGC objects (1–1000)
