= Pat Patrick =

Pat Patrick is the name of:

- Pat Patrick (musician) (Laurdine Kenneth Patrick Jr., 1929–1991), jazz saxophonist and bassist
- Pat Patrick (auto racing) (Ueal Eugene Patrick, 1929–2021), auto racing team owner
