= P. J. Jones =

American racing driver (born 1969)

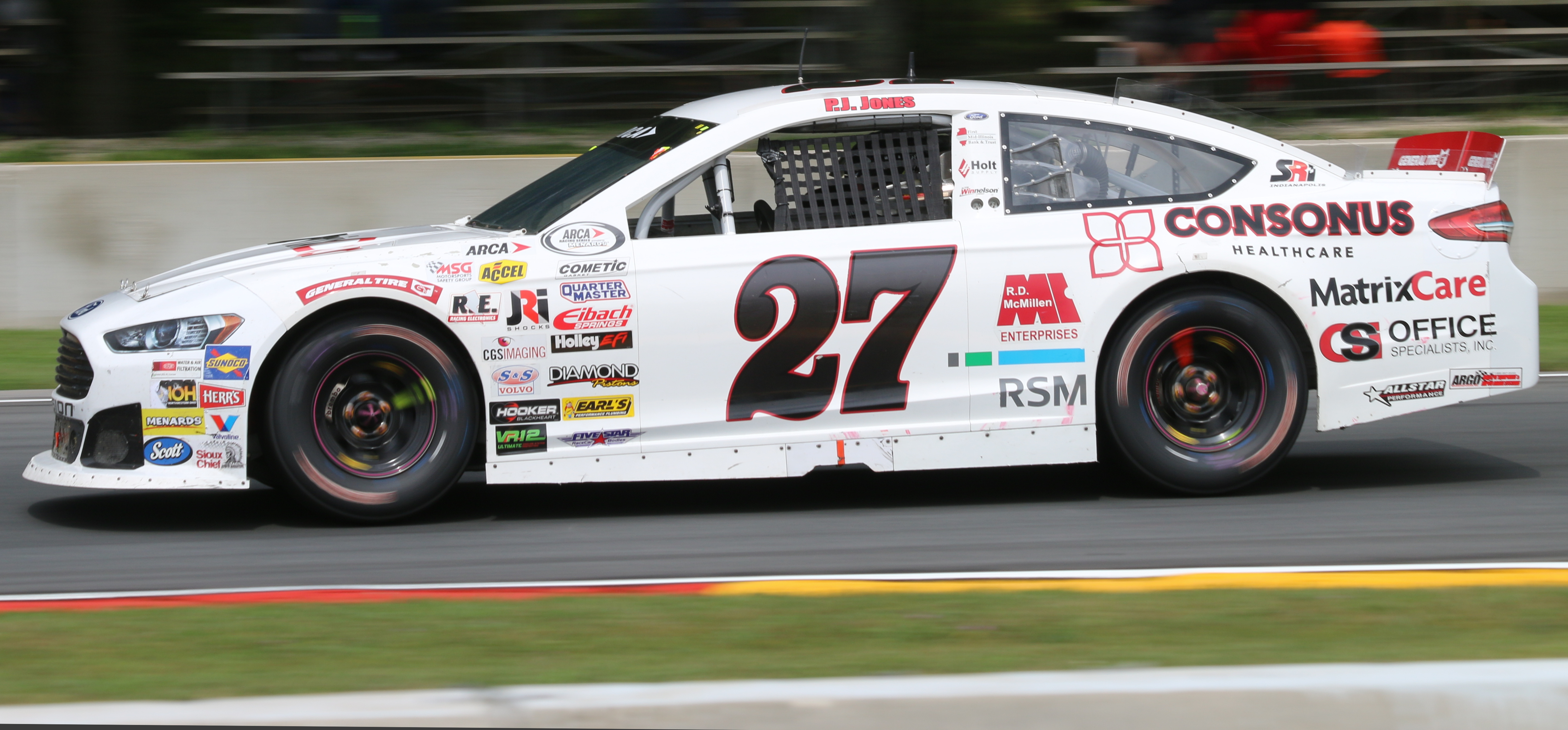
- Jones' No. 27 ARCA Racing Series car at Road America in 2017
- Born: Parnell Velko Jones; April 23, 1969 (age 57); Torrance, California, U.S.
- Achievements: 1993 24 Hours of Daytona winner

NASCAR Cup Series career
- 33 races run over 13 years
- 2011 position: 80th
- Best finish: 42nd (1993)
- First race: 1993 Save Mart Supermarkets 300K (Sears Point)
- Last race: 2011 Toyota/Save Mart 350 (Sonoma)
Wins	Top tens	Poles
0	2	0

NASCAR O'Reilly Auto Parts Series career
- 32 races run over 6 years
- 2017 position: 114th
- Best finish: 38th (2000)
- First race: 2000 NAPA Auto Parts 300 (Daytona)
- Last race: 2008 Zippo 200 (Watkins Glen)
Wins	Top tens	Poles
0	1	0

NASCAR FedEx Freight Truck Series career
- 18 races run over 4 years
- 2008 position: 72nd
- Best finish: 17th (1995)
- First race: 1995 Skoal Bandit Copper World Classic (Phoenix)
- Last race: 2008 Sam's Town 400 (Texas)
Wins	Top tens	Poles
0	4	0

IndyCar Series career
- 2 races run over 2 years
- Best finish: 33rd (2006)
- First race: 2004 Indianapolis 500 (Indy)
- Last race: 2006 Indianapolis 500 (Indy)
Wins	Podiums	Poles
0	0	0

Champ Car career
- 58 races run over 4 years
- Best finish: 17th (1999)
- First race: 1996 Miller Genuine Draft 200 (Milwaukee)
- Last race: 1999 Marlboro 500 (California)
Wins	Podiums	Poles
0	1	0
- Statistics up to date as of June 20, 2013.

Parnell Velko "P. J." Jones (born April 23, 1969) is an American professional racing driver. He has contested in multiple disciplines, including NASCAR, IndyCar, IMSA GT Championship, the American Le Mans Series, USAC, the Chili Bowl, and the Stadium Super Trucks.

Jones was runner-up at the GTP class of the IMSA GT Championship in 1993 and fourth in 1992. He also finished fourth at the 2002 NASCAR Winston Cup Series race at Watkins Glen, and second at the 1999 CART race at Nazareth. His father is Indianapolis 500 winner Parnelli Jones, his brother is Page Jones, a former racing driver, and one of his sons, Jagger Jones, currently races in the Mazda MX-5 Cup. He is also a winner of the 24 Hours of Daytona, which he won in 1993.

== Racing career ==
=== Early career and 1980s ===
Jones' preliminary efforts in racing were focused on go-karting. Upon graduation from his introductory-level competitions, Jones began to enter the oval races at Ascot Park, much as his father did decades prior. Accumulating experience and accolades, Jones would progress vertically to United States Auto Club-sanctioned events. From numerous choices within USAC's open-wheel divisions, Jones opted to participate in the West Coast Midget category in 1986, earning the rookie of the year title in that class.

As Jones continued to compete in USAC, he began to dabble in IMSA GT. At this stage, Jones was participating in the GTO and GTU classes with Clayton-Cunningham Racing and their stable of Mazda RX-7 vehicles. A partial season in both GTO and GTU left Jones just fourteenth and twenty-seventh in the respective standings. Despite low rankings, 1988 was highlighted by a podium finish in one of the GTU races, and a victory in a world championship sprint car race in Auckland.

Before the end of the decade, Jones switched to the American Racing Series with its turbocharged Buick formula cars. Jones triumphed on the Mid-Ohio Sports Car Course as he scored a victory to crown the season, which would culminate in a sixth-place final classification. In the same year, Jones was suspended for thirty days from USAC competition after deliberately colliding with a competitor's vehicle.

=== 1990s ===
Jones returned to the American Racing Series in 1990. Though with the same team, and utilizing the same March/Buick package, Jones failed to score a single race victory. Jones also had an unsuccessful foray into what is now the ARCA Menards Series West and a handful of forgettable trials at the wheel of a Ford Ranger in SCCA's Racetruck Challenge.

Jones' 1991 season began in GTP, running the 24 Hours of Daytona for Dan Gurney and his All American Racers squad, which fielded a Toyota-powered Eagle HF90 in the race, but his focus remained on the American Racing Series. Jones scored two victories in twelve races, both on street circuits in Toronto and Denver, on route to a third place finish in the standings. Prior to the year's end, Jones participated in an ice race.

In 1992, Jones became a full-fledged professional racing driver, now joining Gurney's team for a full season's run in IMSA GTP piloting the brand-new Eagle MkIII. As a rookie in prototype racing, Jones finished fourth in points with two wins, although he was outclassed by his more experienced teammate, Juan Manuel Fangio II, who took the series title. All American Racers retained Jones for 1993 and swept the championship and vice-championship positions in IMSA's GTP category with Jones trailing Fangio. Jones capitalized on his second year of GTP experience by winning the season-opening 24 Hours of Daytona along co-drivers Mark Dismore and Rocky Moran. Later in the season, Jones rewrote the track record of Lime Rock Park with a lap of 43.112 seconds, which stands as of 2024 as the fastest lap ever recorded at the track.

Always willing to broaden his résumé, Jones participated in NASCAR Winston Cup action when such events did not conflict with his sports car exploits. While limited in stock car experience, Jones was able to qualify for six of the eleven races he entered, collecting a top ten finish at historic Watkins Glen International in the No. 9 Ford for Melling Racing. Jones also contested the Chili Bowl in 1993 and many other midget races in 1994, often with his brother Page. In the USAC Silver Crown Series event on the IRP facility, P.J. would score a respectable second-place finish behind Mike Bliss, then the dominant driver on that particular circuit, after starting from the pole position.

At that point, Jones was at a crossroads between stock cars and his childhood dream of open wheel racing, having unofficially tested a CART engine for Toyota and Dan Gurney. After getting his first stock car win in a Winston West series event at Phoenix International Raceway, Jones joined the newly stablished NASCAR SuperTruck division, which was set to begin in 1995, contesting the exhibition races in 1994 and 1995. Racing seven times for Scoop Vessels, Jones picked up two victories (in Mesa Marin and again in Phoenix) which were underscored by a further pair of second-place finishes and another two third-place results. His seventh race ended outside of the top ten. After his good performances, Jones secured the ride for 1995, as the original driver (his brother, Page) was recovering from injuries sustained in a midget crash. In official Truck Series running, Jones was less successful, scoring just two top ten finishes in thirteenth starts. After being released from the team, Jones switched gears again.

With the Toyota engine now an official entrant in CART for 1996, Jones was hired as a driver for the All American Racers team and its Eagle MK-V Champ Car for an abbreviated season that would begin on the Milwaukee Mile. In his second CART race, Jones finished ninth at the Belle Isle street course, with the first points ever scored by a Toyota-powered car in CART competition. Jones continued with this program through 1998; success was largely nonexistent, and would only score points at three other races.

In 1999, Jones switched to the Patrick Racing team, abandoning one motorsport legend in Gurney to join another in Pat Patrick. With better equipment at his disposal, Jones had four consecutive points-scoring finishes from Long Beach to Gateway, including a career-best runner-up result on the Nazareth Speedway, in a year that saw two other top ten classifications in Toronto and Chicago's races.

=== 2000s ===
As with Scott Pruett and Robby Gordon, Jones decided to leave open-wheel racing and make a full-time switch to NASCAR. Unlike the other two former CART competitors, Jones would focus on the Busch Series rather than the premier Cup division, where he would enter just two races. One of those was a relief driver for Gordon, who was participating in the rain-delayed 2000 Indianapolis 500 while the Coca-Cola 600 commenced with Jones in the cockpit of the No. 13 Burger King Ford.

Jones' season started with BACE Motorsports, a team which had won three Busch Series titles from 1995 to 1997, in a Chevrolet Monte Carlo. It was not to be a championship effort, however; with no results better than the twenty-fourth spot by the end of seven races, Jones was relieved of his driving duties. David Ridling was impressed with Jones, and signed him right away to drive his No. 19, bettering his performances to include a seventeenth-place run on Loudon's Magic Mile and a top-ten in the Watkins Glen event, a race Jones believed he and the team "should have won". Jones would return to Watkins Glen in August for the second of his two Winston Cup races; he was quietly twenty-first for Felix Sabates and SABCO Racing as a substitute driver for Ted Musgrave, himself a replacement to the late Kenny Irwin Jr., against whom Jones had raced in USAC.

After rumors circulated about Jones joining a newly formed Galaxy Motorsports and Robert Yates Racing conglomerate for the next season, Jones remained in the Busch Series and signed with Phoenix Racing. Qualifying third for the season-starting Daytona race and scoring a best result of seventeenth on the Atlanta Motor Speedway's oval, Jones was ousted for Jimmy Spencer, significant in that Spencer would later succeed him at both Ultra Motorsports and the Arnold Development team.

After 2001's disappointment, Jones spent 2002 in a variety of series, including the USAC Silver Crown Series where he had found success earlier in his career. Jones parlayed this into a chance to run the Indianapolis 500-mile race with Team Menard; it was to be his Indy Racing League debut and return to top-level North American open-wheel racing in a competitive mount, but misfortune struck when he suffered a neck injury in a crash during May's practice runs and was ruled out for the rest of the month; his replacement, Raul Boesel, placed the car on the front row. The Menards chain would also sponsor him later in the year for a Busch Series race at Phoenix.

Between these events, A. J. Foyt selected Jones to drive the No. 14 Conseco Pontiac in NASCAR Winston Cup competition at the Brickyard 400, where he failed to qualify, and at the SIRIUS Satellite Radio at the Glen, where he earned his best ever result in the series with a fourth place finish. Jones would be invited to return to the Foyt team in 2003, this time for the Dodge/Save Mart 350 to be held on the Sonoma Raceway. For the second time in three attempts with Foyt, Jones failed to qualify for the race, frustrating Foyt to the point that Jones would not be welcomed back to defend his top five from 2002. Instead, Jones would race a Pontiac Grand Prix for Morgan-McClure Motorsports, finishing in an unremarkable 24th place.

Jones made his Craftsman Truck Series return at the 2003 season-closer at Homestead–Miami Speedway and scored a top ten finish for Jim Smith, who brought him back for the Fontana and Phoenix races in 2004, scoring another top ten in the latter. In May 2004, Jones was finally able to make his debut in the Indianapolis 500, a race his father won in 1963. The rain-shortened race was reduced in length for all competitors, but even more so for Jones, who crashed. During the year, Jones also drove five NASCAR Nextel Cup races in Don Arnold's Dodge; further starts came in 2005 for MACH 1 Motorsports, failing to qualify for ten races in fourteen attempts, and the Morgan-McClure ride for the road courses, where he struggled mightily.

Jones made his Craftsman Truck Series return at the 2003 season-closer at Homestead–Miami Speedway and scored a top-ten finish for Jim Smith, who brought him back for the Fontana and Phoenix races in 2004, scoring another top-ten in the latter. In May 2004, Jones was finally able to make his debut in the Indianapolis 500, a race his father won in 1963. The rain-shortened race was reduced in length for all competitors, but even more so for Jones, who crashed. During the year, Jones also drove five NASCAR Nextel Cup races in Don Arnold's Dodge; further starts came in 2005 for MACH 1 Motorsports, failing to qualify for ten races in fourteen attempts, and the Morgan-McClure ride for the road courses, where he struggled mightily.

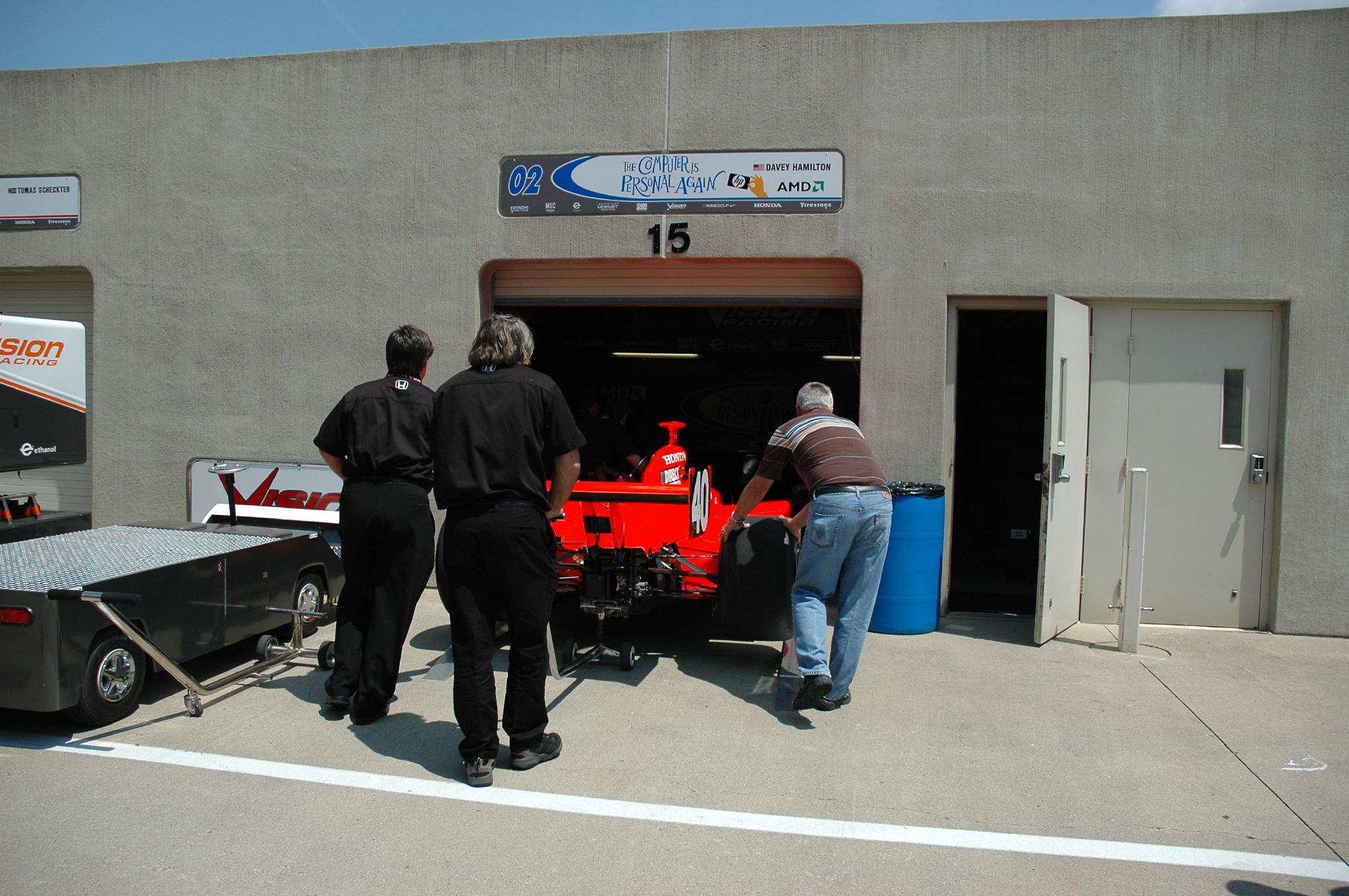
Jones' 2007 Indy 500 entry rests in the garage

2006 began in May for Jones, once again in the Indianapolis 500. Beck Motorsports hired Jones to pilot the No. 98 Curb Records entry, identical in sponsor and number to the 2004 special Jones had driven. Running a Panoz chassis, widely regarded as inferior to the Dallara which populated a greater portion of the field, Jones lacked pace and only managed to qualify on the final row. However, a nineteenth-place result was salvaged. The next stop on the Jones racing calendar was Sonoma, now becoming a tradition with Jones characterized in NASCAR as a road course ringer. Jones did not see the race out to its completion in his Morgan-McClure Chevrolet due to rear end failure, and would not return to the NEXTEL Cup Series that season. Instead, he retreated to the Busch division, between Mike Curb's team and a single start for Johnny Davis Motorsports in Watkins Glen.

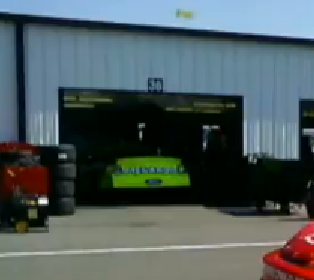
Jones' car prior to the 2007 Pocono race.

As NASCAR Busch Series left the United States for the Autódromo Hermanos Rodríguez in 2007, Richard Childress Racing brought Jones with their team for the road course event Later on, he failed to qualify for the 2007 Indianapolis 500. His No. 40 car had been painted to resemble the one his father used in the 1967 Indianapolis 500 forty years prior. That year, Jones drove the NASCAR road course races with Michael Waltrip Racing's Toyota for a twelfth place finish at Sonoma, and subbed in the Pennsylvania 500 for Robby Gordon Motorsports after the driver for which the team was named was suspended for actions detrimental to stock car racing.

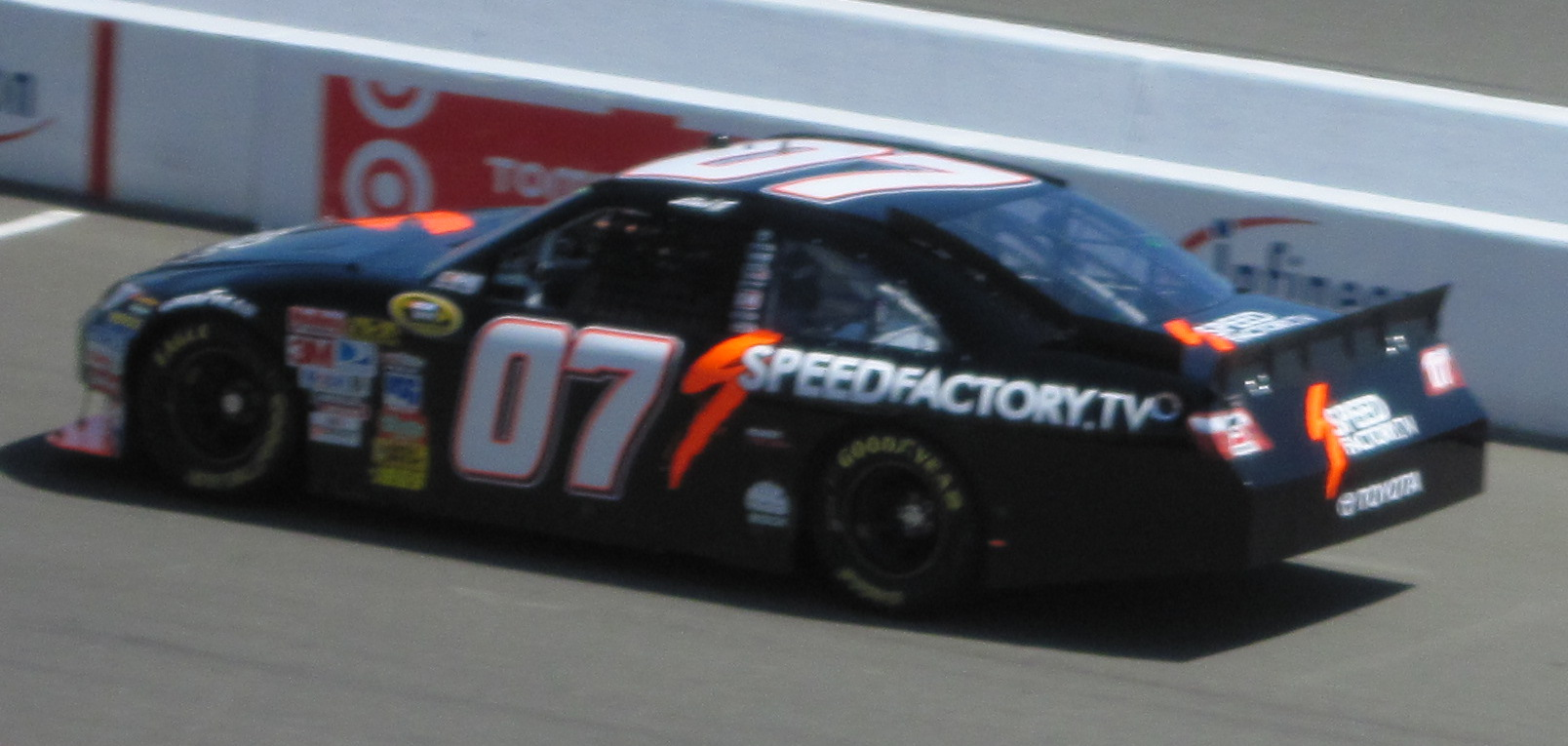
Jones' No. 07 car at Sonoma Raceway in 2010

Jones made his final Nationwide and Truck starts in 2008, and remained as a road course ringer in Sprint Cup competition, driving for Robby Gordon Motorsports in that capacity between 2009 and 2011 in a start-and-park entry.

=== 2010s ===
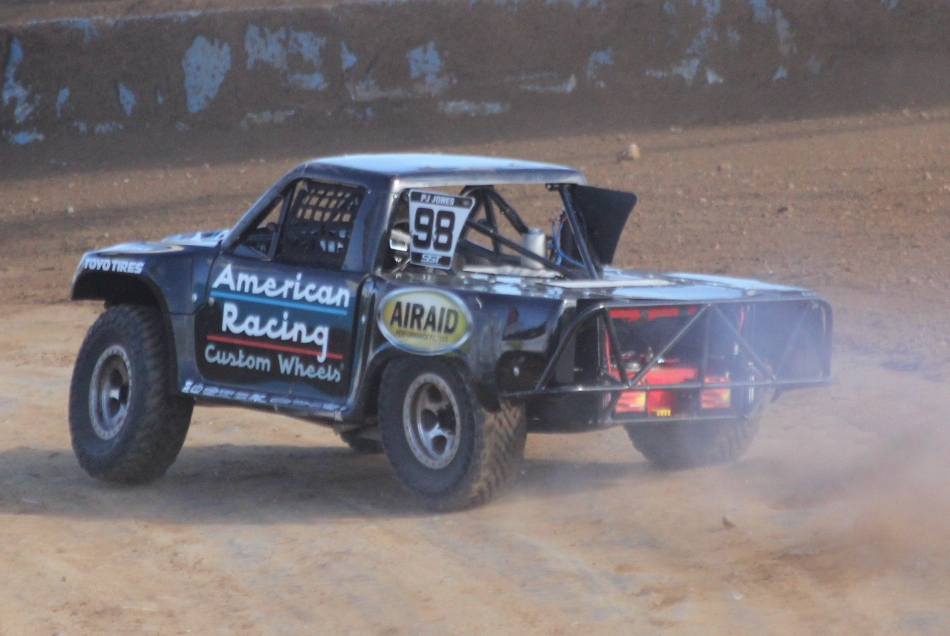
Jones' 2013 Stadium Super Truck

His focus in 2011 had not been the Cup side, though. Rocketsports Racing hired Jones to race with Rocky Moran Jr. in their factory Jaguar XKR GT program in the American Le Mans Series. The car's performance was woeful, and no points were scored, even in rounds where fewer than ten cars had entered, as the car often failed to complete 70% of the class winner's distance due to chronic mechanical issues. Despite Moran's indications that the two would be paired again in 2012, Rocketsports and Jaguar disbanded the team and moved to the LMPC class without either driver.

Jones joined the General Tire Trophylite Race Series off-road truck division for 2012, finding a place to utilize his Baja 1000 experience. In Henderson, Nevada, Jones was victorious.

The 2013 season began at the Chili Bowl midget car race for Jones. He won the seventh heat race on opening night in his RFMS Racing entry. By the week's end, he had been eliminated from contention, and did not feature in the main event. Later in the year, he finished fourth in the inaugural Stadium Super Trucks race at University of Phoenix Stadium. He continued to race in SST that season, resulting fourth in the standings with a win at Las Vegas.

Jones continued racing in the Stadium Super Trucks—albeit on a part-time basis—from 2014 to 2017. He scored race wins at the Grand Prix of St. Petersburg in 2014, the OC Fair & Event Center's Sand Sports Super Show in 2015, and Texas Motor Speedway in 2017.

In 2017, Jones returned to NASCAR, racing in the Xfinity Series race at Watkins Glen International in Chris Cockrum Racing's No. 25 car.

== Personal life ==
Jones was a proficient ice hockey player, scoring ninety-eight goals (coincidentally, Jones often wears this number when racing) in thirty games when he was just short of one decade old and playing peewee hockey in California. He and his team were state champions that year. Any ideas of a professional career in Jones' other sport were hindered by a surgery six years after the championship; following another two years of play, Jones ceased participation in ice hockey of all kinds.

In his late teens and early twenties, Jones enrolled in several courses at El Camino College. While there, he studied various subsets in the overarching field of business education.

Jones has an interest in aircraft. His biography in CART media materials often indicated that Jones was an avid flyer, holding a pilot's license at the time. As far as religion, Jones is irreligious.

In addition to being an auto racer, Jones also runs PJ’s Performance, a garage that caters to UTVs, because he no longer races professionally.

Married to Jolaina, Jones is the father of Jagger and Jace Jones. His residence has been established in Scottsdale, Arizona.

== Motorsports career results ==
=== American Open-Wheel racing results ===
(key) (Races in bold indicate pole position)

==== American Racing Series/Indy Lights ====
American Racing Series / Indy Lights results
Year	Team	1	2	3	4	5	6	7	8	9	10	11	12	13	14	Rank	Points
1989	P.I.G. Racing	PHX; 14	LBH; 2	MIL; 9	DET; 14	POR; 10	MEA; 9	TOR; 2	POC; 9	MOH; 1	ROA; 9	NAZ; 9	LS; 3			**6th**	**90**
1990	P.I.G. Racing	PHX; 13	LBH; 17	MIL; 5	DET; 12	POR; 2	CLE; 2	MEA; 12	TOR; 3	**DEN**; 12	VAN; 11	MOH; 12	ROA; 13	NAZ; 8	LS; 13	**9th**	**68**
1991	Landford Racing	LBH; 15	PHX; 10	MIL; 4	DET; 14	**POR**; 5	CLE; 14	MEA; 2	TOR; 1	DEN; 1	MOH; 4	NAZ; 2	LS; 5			**3rd**	**123**

==== CART ====
CART IndyCar Series results
Year	Team	No.	Chassis	Engine	1	2	3	4	5	6	7	8	9	10	11	12	13	14	15	16	17	18	19	20	Rank	Points	Ref
1996	All American Racers	98	Eagle Mk-V	Toyota RV8A V8t	MIA	RIO	SRF	LBH	NZR	500; Wth	MIL; 24	DET; 9	POR; 24	CLE; 23	TOR; 20	MIS; 16	MOH; 25	ROA; 18	VAN; 13	LS; 27					26th	4	
1997	All American Racers	98	Reynard 96i	Toyota RV8A V8t	MIA; 28	SRF; 26	LBH; 16	NZR; 21																	28th	3	
1997	All American Racers	98	Reynard 97i	Toyota RV8B V8t					RIO; 16	STL; 21	MIL; 14	DET; 14	POR; 20	CLE; 25	TOR; 21	MIS; 28	MOH; 17	ROA; 14	VAN; 25	LS; 17	FON; 10				28th	3	
1998	All American Racers	98	Reynard 98i	Toyota RV8C V8t	MIA; 20	MOT; 30	LBH; 11	NZR; 19	RIO; 13	STL; 12	MIL; 14	DET; 25	POR; 16	CLE; 21	TOR; 19	MIS; 24	MOH; 20	ROA; 22	VAN; 21	LS	HOU	SRF	FON		26th	3	
1999	Patrick Racing	20	Reynard 98i	Ford XD V8t	MIA; 13	MOT; 15																			17th	38	
1999	Patrick Racing	20	Swift 010.c	Ford XD V8t			LBH; 12	NZR; 2	RIO; 7	STL; 8	MIL; 20	POR; 21	CLE; 15	ROA; 17	TOR; 10	MIS; 16	DET							FON; 12	17th	38	
1999	Patrick Racing	40	Reynard 98i	Ford XD V8t														MOH; 15	CHI; 7	VAN; 21	LS	HOU	SRF		17th	38	

==== IRL IndyCar Series ====
Year	Team	No.	Chassis	Engine	1	2	3	4	5	6	7	8	9	10	11	12	13	14	15	16	17	Rank	Points	Ref
2002	Team Menard	2	Dallara	Chevrolet	HOM	PHX	CAL	NAZ	INDY; DNQ	TEX	PIK	RIR	KAN	NSH	MIS	KTY	GAT	CHI	TEX			-	0	
2004	CURB/Agajanian/Beck Motorsports	98	Dallara	Chevrolet	HMS	PHX	MOT	INDY; 28	TXS	RIR	KAN	NSH	MIL	MIS	KTY	PPI	NZR	CHI	FON	TX2		35th	10	
2006	Team Leader Motorsports	98	Panoz	Honda	HMS	STP	MOT	INDY; 19	WGL	TXS	RIR	KAN	NSH	MIL	MIS	KTY	SNM	CHI				33rd	12	
2007	Team Leader/Dollander Racing	40	Dallara	Honda	HMS	STP	MOT	KAN	INDY; DNQ	MIL	TXS	IOW	RIR	WGL	NSH	MOH	MIS	KTY	SNM	DET	CHI	-	0	

==== Indianapolis 500 ====
Year	Chassis	Engine	Start	Finish	Team
2002	Dallara IR-02	Chevrolet Indy V8	Wth		Team Menard
2004	Dallara IR-04	Chevrolet Indy V8	31	28	CURB/Agajanian/Beck Motorsports
2006	Panoz GF09C	Honda HI6R V8	32	19	CURB/Agajanian/Beck Motorsports
2007	Dallara IR-05	Honda HI7R V8	DNQ		Team Leader Motorsports

=== NASCAR ===
(key) (Bold – Pole position awarded by qualifying time. Italics – Pole position earned by points standings or practice time. * – Most laps led.)

==== Sprint Cup Series ====
NASCAR Sprint Cup Series results
Year	Team	No.	Make	1	2	3	4	5	6	7	8	9	10	11	12	13	14	15	16	17	18	19	20	21	22	23	24	25	26	27	28	29	30	31	32	33	34	35	36	NSCC	Pts	Ref
1993	Melling Racing	9	Ford	DAY	CAR	RCH	ATL	DAR	BRI	NWS	MAR; DNQ	TAL; DNQ	SON; 25	CLT	DOV; 34	POC	MCH; 38	DAY; 30	NHA	POC	TAL	GLN; 8	MCH; 26	BRI; DNQ	DAR	RCH	DOV; DNQ	MAR	NWS	CLT	CAR	PHO	ATL; DNQ							42nd	498	
1994	Stroppe Motorsports	38	Ford	DAY	CAR	RCH	ATL	DAR	BRI	NWS	MAR	TAL	SON	CLT	DOV	POC	MCH	DAY	NHA	POC	TAL	IND; DNQ																		59th	134	
1994	Jasper Motorsports	88	Ford																				GLN; 35	MCH	BRI	DAR	RCH	DOV	MAR	NWS	CLT	CAR								59th	134	
1994	Ultra Motorsports	06	Ford																														PHO; 29	ATL						59th	134	
2000	Team Menard	13	Ford	DAY	CAR	LVS	ATL	DAR	BRI	TEX	MAR	TAL	CAL	RCH	CLT; 35	DOV	MCH	POC	SON	DAY	NHA	POC	IND																	58th	158	
2000	Team SABCO	01	Chevy																					GLN; 21	MCH	BRI	DAR	RCH	NHA	DOV	MAR	CLT	TAL	CAR	PHO	HOM	ATL			58th	158	
2002	A. J. Foyt Enterprises	50	Pontiac	DAY	CAR	LVS	ATL	DAR	BRI	TEX	MAR	TAL	CAL	RCH	CLT	DOV	POC	MCH	SON	DAY	CHI	NHA	POC	IND; DNQ																60th	160	
2002	A. J. Foyt Enterprises	14	Pontiac																						GLN; 4	MCH	BRI	DAR	RCH	NHA	DOV	KAN	TAL	CLT	MAR	ATL	CAR	PHO	HOM	60th	160	
2003	A. J. Foyt Enterprises	14	Dodge	DAY	CAR	LVS	ATL	DAR	BRI	TEX	TAL	MAR	CAL	RCH	CLT	DOV	POC	MCH	SON; DNQ	DAY	CHI	NHA	POC	IND																64th	91	
2003	Morgan-McClure Motorsports	4	Pontiac																						GLN; 24	MCH	BRI	DAR	RCH	NHA	DOV	TAL	KAN	CLT	MAR	ATL	PHO	CAR	HOM	64th	91	
2004	Arnold Motorsports	50	Dodge	DAY	CAR	LVS	ATL	DAR	BRI	TEX	MAR	TAL	CAL	RCH	CLT	DOV	POC; 22	MCH; 25	SON; 39	DAY	CHI; 39	NHA	POC; 43	IND	GLN	MCH	BRI	CAL	RCH	NHA	DOV	TAL	KAN	CLT	MAR	ATL	PHO	DAR	HOM	54th	316	
2005	Mach 1 Motorsports	34	Chevy	DAY	CAL	LVS	ATL	BRI	MAR	TEX	PHO	TAL	DAR	RCH	CLT	DOV	POC; DNQ	MCH; DNQ		DAY	CHI; DNQ	NHA	POC; 41	IND; DNQ		MCH; DNQ	BRI; DNQ	CAL; DNQ	RCH	NHA	DOV	TAL								62nd	189	
2005	Morgan-McClure Motorsports	4	Chevy																SON; 32						GLN; 42															62nd	189	
2005	Front Row Motorsports	92	Dodge																														KAN; 41							62nd	189	
2005	Front Row Motorsports	92	Chevy																															CLT; DNQ	MAR	ATL	TEX; DNQ	PHO; DNQ	HOM	62nd	189	
2006	Morgan-McClure Motorsports	4	Chevy	DAY	CAL	LVS	ATL	BRI	MAR	TEX	PHO	TAL	RCH	DAR	CLT	DOV	POC	MCH	SON; 36	DAY	CHI	NHA	POC	IND	GLN	MCH	BRI	CAL	RCH	NHA	DOV	KAN	TAL	CLT	MAR	ATL	TEX	PHO	HOM	70th	55	
2007	Michael Waltrip Racing	00	Toyota	DAY	CAL	LVS	ATL	BRI	MAR	TEX	PHO	TAL	RCH	DAR	CLT	DOV	POC	MCH	SON; 12	NHA	DAY	CHI	IND		GLN; 25	MCH	BRI	CAL	RCH	NHA	DOV	KAN	TAL	CLT	MAR	ATL	TEX	PHO	HOM	55th	267	
2007	Robby Gordon Motorsports	7	Ford																					POC; 37																55th	267	
2008	Hall of Fame Racing	96	Toyota	DAY	CAL	LVS	ATL	BRI	MAR	TEX	PHO	TAL	RCH	DAR	CLT	DOV	POC	MCH	SON	NHA	DAY	CHI	IND	POC	GLN; 37	MCH	BRI	CAL	RCH	NHA	DOV	KAN	TAL	CLT	MAR	ATL	TEX	PHO	HOM	67th	52	
2009	Robby Gordon Motorsports	04	Toyota	DAY	CAL	LVS	ATL	BRI	MAR	TEX	PHO	TAL	RCH	DAR	CLT	DOV	POC	MCH	SON; 43	NHA	DAY	CHI	IND	POC	GLN; 41	MCH	BRI	ATL	RCH	NHA	DOV	KAN	CAL	CLT	MAR	TAL	TEX	PHO	HOM	64th	40	
2010	Robby Gordon Motorsports	07	Toyota	DAY	CAL	LVS	ATL	BRI	MAR	PHO	TEX	TAL	RCH	DAR	DOV	CLT	POC	MCH	SON; 41	NHA	DAY	CHI	IND		GLN; 41															56th	190	
2010	Robby Gordon Motorsports	7	Toyota																					POC; 35		MCH; 37	BRI	ATL	RCH	NHA	DOV	KAN	CAL	CLT	MAR	TAL	TEX	PHO	HOM	56th	190	
2011	Robby Gordon Motorsports	77	Dodge	DAY	PHO	LVS	BRI	CAL	MAR	TEX	TAL	RCH	DAR	DOV	CLT	KAN	POC	MCH	SON; 43	DAY	KEN	NHA	IND	POC	GLN; DNQ	MCH	BRI	ATL	RCH	CHI	NHA	DOV	KAN	CLT	TAL	MAR	TEX	PHO	HOM	80th	0^{1}	

==== Xfinity Series ====
NASCAR Xfinity Series results
Year	Team	No.	Make	1	2	3	4	5	6	7	8	9	10	11	12	13	14	15	16	17	18	19	20	21	22	23	24	25	26	27	28	29	30	31	32	33	34	35	NXSC	Pts	Ref
2000	BACE Motorsports	74	Chevy	DAY; 40	CAR; 35	LVS; 35	ATL; 24	DAR; 27	BRI; 39	TEX; 31																													38th	1262	
2000	Ridling Motorsports	19	Chevy								NSV; DNQ	TAL; 38	CAL; 42	RCH; DNQ	NHA; 17	CLT; DNQ	DOV; 40	SBO; 35	MYB; 41	GLN; 9	MLW; 38	NZH; 39	PPR; 40	GTY; 37	IRP; 26	MCH; DNQ	BRI; DNQ	DAR	RCH	DOV; DNQ	CLT	CAR	MEM	PHO					38th	1262	
2000	Phoenix Racing	1	Chevy																																HOM; 37				38th	1262	
2001	Phoenix Racing	1	Chevy	DAY; 27	CAR; 37	LVS; 27	ATL; 17	DAR	BRI	TEX	NSH	TAL	CAL	RCH	NHA	NZH	CLT	DOV	KEN	MLW	GLN	CHI	GTY	PPR	IRP	MCH	BRI	DAR	RCH	DOV	KAN	CLT	MEM	PHO	CAR	HOM			65th	328	
2002	Tuttle Motorsports	97	Chevy	DAY	CAR	LVS	DAR	BRI	TEX	NSH	TAL	CAL	RCH	NHA	NZH	CLT	DOV	NSH	KEN	MLW	DAY	CHI	GTY	PPR	IRP	MCH	BRI	DAR	RCH	DOV	KAN	CLT	MEM	ATL	CAR	PHO; 35	HOM		115th	58	
2006	Curb-Agajanian Motorsports	43	Dodge	DAY	CAL	MXC	LVS	ATL	BRI	TEX	NSH	PHO	TAL	RCH	DAR	CLT	DOV	NSH	KEN	MLW	DAY; 13	CHI	NHA	MAR	GTY	IRP; 39				CAL; 22	RCH	DOV	KAN	CLT	MEM	TEX	PHO; 21	HOM	75th	376	
2006	Davis Motorsports	0	Chevy																								GLN; 43	MCH	BRI										75th	376	
2007	Richard Childress Racing	21	Chevy	DAY	CAL	MXC; 24	LVS	ATL	BRI	NSH	TEX	PHO	TAL	RCH	DAR	CLT	DOV	NSH	KEN	MLW	NHA	DAY	CHI	GTY	IRP	CGV	GLN	MCH	BRI	CAL	RCH	DOV	KAN	CLT	MEM	TEX	PHO	HOM	131st	91	
2008	MacDonald Motorsports	81	Dodge	DAY	CAL	LVS	ATL	BRI	NSH	TEX	PHO	MXC	TAL	RCH	DAR	CLT	DOV	NSH	KEN	MLW	NHA	DAY	CHI	GTY	IRP	CGV	GLN; 38	MCH	BRI	CAL	RCH	DOV	KAN	CLT	MEM	TEX	PHO	HOM	141st	49	
2017	Chris Cockrum Racing	25	Chevy	DAY	ATL	LVS	PHO	CAL	TEX	BRI	RCH	TAL	CLT	DOV	POC	MCH	IOW	DAY	KEN	NHA	IND	IOW	GLN; DNQ	MOH	BRI	ROA	DAR	RCH	CHI	KEN	DOV	CLT	KAN	TEX	PHO	HOM			114th	0	

==== Craftsman Truck Series ====
NASCAR Craftsman Truck Series results
Year	Team	No.	Make	1	2	3	4	5	6	7	8	9	10	11	12	13	14	15	16	17	18	19	20	21	22	23	24	25	NCTC	Pts	Ref
1995	Vestar Motorsports	1	Chevy	PHO; 16	TUS; 2	SGS; 16	MMR; 14	POR; 17	EVG; 6	I70; 20	LVL; 12	BRI; 16	MLW; 23	CNS; 11	HPT; 22	IRP; 31	FLM	RCH	MAR	NWS	SON	MMR	PHO						17th	1519	
2003	Ultra Motorsports	27	Dodge	DAY	DAR	MMR	MAR	CLT	DOV	TEX	MEM	MLW	KAN	KEN	GTW	MCH	IRP	NSH	BRI	RCH	NHA	CAL	LVS	SBO	TEX	MAR	PHO	HOM; 9	92nd	138	
2004	Ultra Motorsports	2	Dodge	DAY	ATL	MAR	MFD	CLT	DOV	TEX	MEM	MLW	KAN	KEN	GTW	MCH	IRP	NSH	BRI	RCH	NHA	LVS	CAL; 14	TEX	MAR	PHO; 8	DAR	HOM	58th	263	
2008	MB Motorsports	63	Ford	DAY; 35	CAL	ATL	MAR	KAN	CLT	MFD	DOV																		72nd	152	
2008	MB Motorsports	63	Chevy									TEX; 23	MCH	MLW	MEM	KEN	IRP	NSH	BRI	GTW	NHA	LVS	TAL	MAR	ATL	TEX	PHO	HOM	72nd	152	

^{*} Season still in progress
^{1} Ineligible for series points

=== ARCA Racing Series ===
(key) (Bold – Pole position awarded by qualifying time. Italics – Pole position earned by points standings or practice time. * – Most laps led.)

ARCA Racing Series results
Year	Team	No.	Make	1	2	3	4	5	6	7	8	9	10	11	12	13	14	15	16	17	18	19	20	ARSC	Pts	Ref
2017	RFMS Racing	27	Ford	DAY	NSH	SLM	TAL	TOL	ELK	POC	MCH	MAD	IOW	IRP	POC	WIN	ISF	ROA; 3	DSF	SLM	CHI	KEN	KAN	76th	220	

=== Stadium Super Trucks ===
(key) (Bold – Pole position. Italics – Fastest qualifier. * – Most laps led.)

Stadium Super Trucks results
Year	1	2	3	4	5	6	7	8	9	10	11	12	13	14	15	16	17	18	19	20	21	22	SSTC	Pts	Ref
2013	PHO; 5	LBH; 5	LAN; 3	SDG; 5	SDG; 8	STL; 11	TOR; 5	TOR; 6	CRA; 9	CRA; 10	OCF; 9	OCF; 5	OCF; 3	CPL; 1*									4th	289	
2014	STP; 7	STP; 1*	LBH; 4	IMS	IMS	DET	DET	DET	AUS	TOR	TOR	OCF	OCF; 4	CSS	LVV	LVV; 6							14th	88	
2015	ADE	ADE	ADE	STP	STP	LBH	DET; 7^{†}	DET; 4^{†}	DET; 4^{†}	AUS	TOR	TOR	OCF; 1*	OCF; 4^{†}	OCF; 5^{†}	SRF	SRF	SRF	SRF	SYD	LVV	LVV	37th	-	
2016	ADE	ADE	ADE	STP	STP	LBH	LBH	DET	DET	DET	TOW	TOW	TOW	TOR; 7	TOR; 8	CLT	CLT	OCF; 2	OCF; 4	SRF; 2	SRF; 8	SRF; 12	12th	129	
2017	ADE	ADE	ADE	STP; 4	STP; 5	LBH; 9	LBH	PER	PER	PER	DET	DET	TEX; 1*	TEX; 6	HID	HID	HID	BEI	GLN	GLN	ELS	ELS	13th	99	
† – Replaced Sheldon Creed and Keegan Kincaid at Detroit and OC Fair, respectively, points went to them
