= 1998 Toyota Grand Prix of Long Beach =

(United States) 1998 Long Beach
Race details
- Race 3 of 19 in the 1998 CART season
- Date: April 5, 1998
- Official name: 1998 Toyota Grand Prix of Long Beach
- Location: Streets of Long Beach; Long Beach, California, United States
- Course: Temporary street circuit 1.586 mi / 2.552 km
- Distance: 105 laps 166.530 mi / 268.004 km
- Weather: Dry

Pole position
- Driver: (United States) Bryan Herta (Team Rahal)
- Time: 0:50.945

Fastest lap
- Driver: (United States) Bobby Rahal (Team Rahal)
- Time: 0:51.333 (on lap 96 of 105)

Podium
- First: (Italy) Alex Zanardi (Chip Ganassi Racing)
- Second: (United Kingdom) Dario Franchitti (Team KOOL Green)
- Third: (United States) Bryan Herta (Team Rahal)

Chronology
Previous	Next
1997	1999

The 1998 Toyota Grand Prix of Long Beach was the third round of the 1998 CART FedEx Champ Car World Series season, held on April 5, 1998, on the Long Beach Street Circuit. Alex Zanardi won the race, even though he was a lap down at one point.

This is the last Grand Prix of Long Beach to have Al Unser Jr and Bobby Rahal.

== Classification ==
=== Race ===
Pos	No	Driver	Team	Laps	Time/Retired	Grid	Points
1	1	(Italy) Alex Zanardi	Chip Ganassi Racing	105	1:51:29.113	11	20
2	27	(United Kingdom) Dario Franchitti	Team Green	105	+2.917	8	16
3	8	(United States) Bryan Herta	Team Rahal	105	+4.336	1	14+1
4	40	(Mexico) Adrián Fernández	Patrick Racing	105	+5.885	3	12
5	21	(Brazil) Tony Kanaan	Tasman Motorsports Group	105	+15.905	13	10
6	99	(Canada) Greg Moore	Forsythe Racing	105	+19.357	14	8
7	18	(United Kingdom) Mark Blundell	PacWest Racing Group	105	+21.158	23	6
8	12	(United States) Jimmy Vasser	Chip Ganassi Racing	105	+24.602	20	5
9	16	(Brazil) Hélio Castro-Neves	Bettenhausen Racing	105	+37.374	15	4
10	17	(Brazil) Maurício Gugelmin	PacWest Racing Group	105	+51.452	22	3
11	98	(United States) P. J. Jones	All American Racing	104	+1 Lap	25	2
12	20	(United States) Scott Pruett	Patrick Racing	104	+1 Lap	7	1
13	34	(Brazil) Gualter Salles	Payton/Coyne Racing	104	+1 Lap	4	
14	36	(United States) Alex Barron	All American Racing	103	+2 Laps	27	
15	77	(Germany) Arnd Meier	Davis Racing	102	+3 Laps	21	
16	15	(Italy) Domenico Schiattarella	Project Indy	101	Contact	28	
17	7	(United States) Bobby Rahal	Team Rahal	101	+4 Laps	2	
18	9	(Finland) JJ Lehto	Hogan Racing	99	+6 Laps	16	
19	24	(Japan) Hiro Matsushita	Arciero-Wells Racing	98	+7 Laps	29	
20	5	(Brazil) Gil de Ferran	Walker Racing	94	Transmission	5	1
21	6	(United States) Michael Andretti	Newman-Haas Racing	55	Tire	6	
22	3	(Brazil) André Ribeiro	Team Penske	55	Oil leak	17	
23	10	(United States) Richie Hearn	Della Penna Motorsports	53	Transmission	19	
24	25	(Italy) Max Papis	Arciero-Wells Racing	37	Contact	24	
25	26	(Canada) Paul Tracy	Team Green	19	Contact	9	
26	11	(Brazil) Christian Fittipaldi	Newman-Haas Racing	19	Contact	12	
27	19	(Mexico) Michel Jourdain Jr.	Payton/Coyne Racing	14	Contact	17	
28	33	(Canada) Patrick Carpentier	Forsythe Racing	8	Contact	26	
29	2	(United States) Al Unser Jr.	Team Penske	0	Contact	10	

== Caution flags ==
Laps	Cause
1–3	Unser Jr. (2), Castroneves (16) contact
15–18	Jourdain Jr. (19) contact
20–23	Tracy (26), Fittipaldi (11) contact
26–28	Jones (98), Rahal (7), Andretti (6) contact
30–33	Matsushita (24), Salles (34) contact
39–42	Papis (25), Barron (36) contact
55–61	Andretti (6) contact

== Lap leaders ==
Laps	Leader
1–20	Bryan Herta
21–25	JJ Lehto
26–39	Hélio Castroneves
40–80	Gil de Ferran
81–82	Hélio Castroneves
83–92	Gil de Ferran
93	Bryan Herta
94–95	Dario Franchitti
96	Adrián Fernández
97–98	Greg Moore
99–103	Bryan Herta
104–105	Alex Zanardi

Driver	Laps led
Gil de Ferran	51
Bryan Herta	26
Hélio Castroneves	16
JJ Lehto	5
Alex Zanardi	2
Dario Franchitti	2
Greg Moore	2
Adrián Fernández	1

== Point standings after race ==
Pos	Driver	Points
1	(Mexico) Adrián Fernández	41
2	(Canada) Greg Moore	37
3	(Italy) Alex Zanardi	34
4	(United Kingdom) Dario Franchitti	25
5	(United States) Michael Andretti	21

Preceded by 1997 Grand Prix of Long Beach	Grand Prix of Long Beach	Succeeded by 1999 Toyota Grand Prix of Long Beach
