= 2002 Sirius Satellite Radio at The Glen =

22nd race of the 2002 NASCAR Winston Cup Series

Race details
- Race 22 of 36 in the 2002 NASCAR Winston Cup Series
- The 2002 Sirius Satellite Radio at The Glen program cover, featuring Jeff Gordon.
- Date: August 11, 2002
- Official name: 17th Annual Sirius Satellite Radio at The Glen
- Location: Watkins Glen, New York, Watkins Glen International
- Course: Permanent racing facility
- Course length: 2.454 miles (3.949 km)
- Distance: 90 laps, 220.5 mi (354.86 km)
- Scheduled distance: 90 laps, 220.5 mi (354.86 km)
- Average speed: 82.208 miles per hour (132.301 km/h)

Pole position
Driver	Ricky Rudd	Robert Yates Racing
- Time: 1:11.885

Most laps led
Driver	Tony Stewart	Joe Gibbs Racing
- Laps: 34

Winner
No. 20	Tony Stewart	Joe Gibbs Racing

Television in the United States
- Network: NBC
- Announcers: Allen Bestwick, Benny Parsons, Wally Dallenbach Jr.

Radio in the United States
- Radio: Motor Racing Network

The 2002 Sirius Satellite Radio at The Glen was the 22nd stock car race of the 2002 NASCAR Winston Cup Series and the 17th iteration of the event. The race was held on Sunday, August 11, 2002, at the shortened layout of Watkins Glen International, a 2.454 miles (3.949 km) permanent road course layout. The race took the scheduled 90 laps to complete. At race's end, Tony Stewart, driving for Joe Gibbs Racing, would hold off the field on a restart with one to go to win his 15th career NASCAR Winston Cup Series win and his second and final win of the season. To fill out the podium, Ryan Newman of Penske Racing and Robby Gordon of Richard Childress Racing would finish second and third, respectively.

== Background ==
The layout of Watkins Glen International NASCAR uses.

Watkins Glen International (nicknamed "The Glen") is an automobile race track located in Watkins Glen, New York at the southern tip of Seneca Lake. It was long known around the world as the home of the Formula One United States Grand Prix, which it hosted for twenty consecutive years (1961–1980), but the site has been home to road racing of nearly every class, including the World Sportscar Championship, Trans-Am, Can–Am, NASCAR Sprint Cup Series, IMSA and the IndyCar Series.

Initially, public roads in the village were used for the race course. In 1956 a permanent circuit for the race was built. In 1968 the race was extended to six hours, becoming the 6 Hours of Watkins Glen. The circuit's current layout has more or less been the same since 1971, although a chicane was installed at the uphill Esses in 1975 to slow cars through these corners, where there was a fatality during practice at the 1973 United States Grand Prix. The chicane was removed in 1985, but another chicane called the "Inner Loop" was installed in 1992 after J. D. McDuffie's fatal accident during the previous year's NASCAR Winston Cup event.

The circuit is known as the Mecca of North American road racing and is a very popular venue among fans and drivers. The facility is currently owned by NASCAR.

=== Entry list ===
- (R) denotes rookie driver.

#	Driver	Team	Make
1	Steve Park	Dale Earnhardt, Inc.	Chevrolet
2	Rusty Wallace	Penske Racing	Ford
4	Mike Skinner	Morgan–McClure Motorsports	Chevrolet
5	Terry Labonte	Hendrick Motorsports	Chevrolet
6	Mark Martin	Roush Racing	Ford
7	Casey Atwood	Ultra-Evernham Motorsports	Dodge
8	Dale Earnhardt Jr.	Dale Earnhardt, Inc.	Chevrolet
9	Bill Elliott	Evernham Motorsports	Dodge
09	Shane Lewis	Otto Motorsports	Ford
10	Johnny Benson Jr.	MBV Motorsports	Pontiac
11	Brett Bodine	Brett Bodine Racing	Ford
12	Ryan Newman (R)	Penske Racing	Ford
14	P. J. Jones	A. J. Foyt Enterprises	Pontiac
15	Michael Waltrip	Dale Earnhardt, Inc.	Chevrolet
17	Matt Kenseth	Roush Racing	Ford
18	Bobby Labonte	Joe Gibbs Racing	Pontiac
19	Jeremy Mayfield	Evernham Motorsports	Dodge
20	Tony Stewart	Joe Gibbs Racing	Pontiac
21	Elliott Sadler	Wood Brothers Racing	Ford
22	Ward Burton	Bill Davis Racing	Dodge
23	Tom Hubert	Bill Davis Racing	Dodge
24	Jeff Gordon	Hendrick Motorsports	Chevrolet
25	Joe Nemechek	Hendrick Motorsports	Chevrolet
26	Todd Bodine	Haas-Carter Motorsports	Ford
28	Ricky Rudd	Robert Yates Racing	Ford
29	Kevin Harvick	Richard Childress Racing	Chevrolet
30	Jeff Green	Richard Childress Racing	Chevrolet
31	Robby Gordon	Richard Childress Racing	Chevrolet
32	Ricky Craven	PPI Motorsports	Ford
36	Ken Schrader	MB2 Motorsports	Pontiac
40	Sterling Marlin	Chip Ganassi Racing	Dodge
41	Scott Pruett	Chip Ganassi Racing	Dodge
42	Jimmy Spencer	Chip Ganassi Racing	Dodge
43	John Andretti	Petty Enterprises	Dodge
44	Jerry Nadeau	Petty Enterprises	Dodge
45	Kyle Petty	Petty Enterprises	Dodge
46	Justin Bell	Ash Motorsports	Ford
48	Jimmie Johnson (R)	Hendrick Motorsports	Chevrolet
55	Bobby Hamilton	Andy Petree Racing	Chevrolet
62	Austin Cameron	Orleans Racing	Chevrolet
67	Boris Said	Jasper Motorsports	Ford
74	Joe Varde	BACE Motorsports	Chevrolet
77	Dave Blaney	Jasper Motorsports	Ford
88	Dale Jarrett	Robert Yates Racing	Ford
97	Kurt Busch	Roush Racing	Ford
98	Kenny Wallace	Innovative Motorsports	Chevrolet
99	Jeff Burton	Roush Racing	Ford
Official entry list

== Practice ==
=== First practice ===
The first practice session was held on Friday, August 9, at 11:20 AM EST, and would last for 2 hours. Scott Pruett of Chip Ganassi Racing would set the fastest time in the session, with a lap of 1:11.661 and an average speed of 123.079 miles per hour (198.076 km/h).

Pos.	#	Driver	Team	Make	Time	Speed
1	41	Scott Pruett	Chip Ganassi Racing	Dodge	1:11.661	123.079
2	31	Robby Gordon	Richard Childress Racing	Chevrolet	1:11.686	123.037
3	20	Tony Stewart	Joe Gibbs Racing	Pontiac	1:11.904	122.664
Full first practice results

=== Second practice ===
The second practice session was held on Saturday, August 10, at 9:30 AM EST, and would last for 45 minutes. Tony Stewart of Joe Gibbs Racing would set the fastest time in the session, with a lap of 1:12.600 and an average speed of 121.488 miles per hour (195.516 km/h).

Pos.	#	Driver	Team	Make	Time	Speed
1	20	Tony Stewart	Joe Gibbs Racing	Pontiac	1:12.600	121.488
2	67	Boris Said	Jasper Motorsports	Ford	1:12.646	121.411
3	31	Robby Gordon	Richard Childress Racing	Chevrolet	1:12.671	121.369
Full second practice results

=== Final practice ===
The final practice session was held on Saturday, August 10, at 11:15 AM EST, and would last for 45 minutes. Matt Kenseth of Roush Racing would set the fastest time in the session, with a lap of 1:12.753 and an average speed of 121.232 miles per hour (195.104 km/h).

Pos.	#	Driver	Team	Make	Time	Speed
1	17	Matt Kenseth	Roush Racing	Ford	1:12.753	121.232
2	41	Scott Pruett	Chip Ganassi Racing	Dodge	1:12.806	121.144
3	24	Jeff Gordon	Hendrick Motorsports	Chevrolet	1:12.838	121.091
Full Final practice results

== Qualifying ==
Qualifying was held on Friday, August 9, at 3:05 PM EST. Drivers would each have one lap to set a lap time. Positions 1-36 would be decided on time, while positions 37-43 would be based on provisionals. Six spots are awarded by the use of provisionals based on owner's points. The seventh is awarded to a past champion who has not otherwise qualified for the race. If no past champion needs the provisional, the next team in the owner points will be awarded a provisional.

Ricky Rudd of Robert Yates Racing would win the pole, setting a time of 1:11.885 and an average speed of 122.696 miles per hour (197.460 km/h).

Four drivers would fail to qualify: Austin Cameron, Shane Lewis, Justin Bell, and Jimmy Spencer.

=== Full qualifying results ===
Pos.	#	Driver	Team	Make	Time	Speed
1	28	Ricky Rudd	Robert Yates Racing	Ford	1:11.885	122.696
2	15	Michael Waltrip	Dale Earnhardt, Inc.	Chevrolet	1:11.921	122.635
3	20	Tony Stewart	Joe Gibbs Racing	Pontiac	1:12.009	122.485
4	9	Bill Elliott	Evernham Motorsports	Dodge	1:12.044	122.425
5	12	Ryan Newman (R)	Penske Racing	Ford	1:12.058	122.401
6	29	Kevin Harvick	Richard Childress Racing	Chevrolet	1:12.113	122.308
7	31	Robby Gordon	Richard Childress Racing	Chevrolet	1:12.148	122.249
8	17	Matt Kenseth	Roush Racing	Ford	1:12.212	122.140
9	97	Kurt Busch	Roush Racing	Ford	1:12.256	122.066
10	2	Rusty Wallace	Penske Racing	Ford	1:12.302	121.988
11	55	Bobby Hamilton	Andy Petree Racing	Chevrolet	1:12.316	121.965
12	48	Jimmie Johnson (R)	Hendrick Motorsports	Chevrolet	1:12.329	121.943
13	26	Todd Bodine	Haas-Carter Motorsports	Ford	1:12.356	121.897
14	14	P. J. Jones	A. J. Foyt Enterprises	Pontiac	1:12.434	121.766
15	6	Mark Martin	Roush Racing	Ford	1:12.455	121.731
16	30	Jeff Green	Richard Childress Racing	Chevrolet	1:12.513	121.633
17	88	Dale Jarrett	Robert Yates Racing	Ford	1:12.523	121.617
18	22	Ward Burton	Bill Davis Racing	Dodge	1:12.611	121.469
19	41	Scott Pruett	Chip Ganassi Racing	Dodge	1:12.612	121.467
20	77	Dave Blaney	Jasper Motorsports	Ford	1:12.654	121.397
21	8	Dale Earnhardt Jr.	Dale Earnhardt, Inc.	Chevrolet	1:12.658	121.391
22	4	Mike Skinner	Morgan–McClure Motorsports	Chevrolet	1:12.664	121.381
23	24	Jeff Gordon	Hendrick Motorsports	Chevrolet	1:12.737	121.259
24	18	Bobby Labonte	Joe Gibbs Racing	Pontiac	1:12.864	121.047
25	99	Jeff Burton	Roush Racing	Ford	1:12.909	120.973
26	7	Casey Atwood	Ultra-Evernham Motorsports	Dodge	1:12.947	120.910
27	43	John Andretti	Petty Enterprises	Dodge	1:12.977	120.860
28	40	Sterling Marlin	Chip Ganassi Racing	Dodge	1:12.983	120.850
29	67	Boris Said	Jasper Motorsports	Ford	1:12.989	120.840
30	19	Jeremy Mayfield	Evernham Motorsports	Dodge	1:12.990	120.839
31	11	Brett Bodine	Brett Bodine Racing	Ford	1:13.034	120.766
32	21	Elliott Sadler	Wood Brothers Racing	Ford	1:13.059	120.724
33	25	Joe Nemechek	Hendrick Motorsports	Chevrolet	1:13.098	120.660
34	45	Kyle Petty	Petty Enterprises	Dodge	1:13.149	120.576
35	44	Jerry Nadeau	Petty Enterprises	Dodge	1:13.385	120.188
36	1	Steve Park	Dale Earnhardt, Inc.	Chevrolet	1:13.425	120.123
Provisionals
37	32	Ricky Craven	PPI Motorsports	Ford	1:14.012	119.170
38	5	Terry Labonte	Hendrick Motorsports	Chevrolet	1:13.438	120.101
39	10	Johnny Benson Jr.	MBV Motorsports	Pontiac	1:14.453	118.464
40	23	Tom Hubert	Bill Davis Racing	Dodge	1:14.017	119.162
41	36	Ken Schrader	MB2 Motorsports	Pontiac	1:13.751	119.592
42	98	Kenny Wallace	Innovative Motorsports	Chevrolet	1:13.775	119.553
43	74	Joe Varde	BACE Motorsports	Chevrolet	1:13.885	119.375
Failed to qualify
44	62	Austin Cameron	Orleans Racing	Chevrolet	1:14.118	118.999
45	09	Shane Lewis	Otto Motorsports	Ford	1:14.376	118.587
46	46	Justin Bell	Ash Motorsports	Ford	1:15.860	116.267
47	42	Jimmy Spencer	Chip Ganassi Racing	Dodge	1:16.262	115.654
Official qualifying results

== Race results ==
Fin	St	#	Driver	Team	Make	Laps	Led	Status	Pts	Winnings
1	3	20	Tony Stewart	Joe Gibbs Racing	Pontiac	90	34	running	185	$165,303
2	5	12	Ryan Newman (R)	Penske Racing	Ford	90	11	running	175	$107,725
3	7	31	Robby Gordon	Richard Childress Racing	Chevrolet	90	21	running	170	$108,706
4	14	14	P. J. Jones	A. J. Foyt Enterprises	Pontiac	90	0	running	160	$65,950
5	1	28	Ricky Rudd	Robert Yates Racing	Ford	90	3	running	160	$109,867
6	19	41	Scott Pruett	Chip Ganassi Racing	Dodge	90	0	running	150	$66,690
7	25	99	Jeff Burton	Roush Racing	Ford	90	0	running	146	$93,927
8	13	26	Todd Bodine	Haas-Carter Motorsports	Ford	90	0	running	142	$73,572
9	2	15	Michael Waltrip	Dale Earnhardt, Inc.	Chevrolet	90	1	running	143	$54,505
10	15	6	Mark Martin	Roush Racing	Ford	90	0	running	134	$83,998
11	27	43	John Andretti	Petty Enterprises	Dodge	90	0	running	130	$72,288
12	16	30	Jeff Green	Richard Childress Racing	Chevrolet	90	0	running	127	$44,475
13	29	67	Boris Said	Jasper Motorsports	Ford	90	0	running	124	$40,425
14	6	29	Kevin Harvick	Richard Childress Racing	Chevrolet	90	0	running	121	$85,938
15	30	19	Jeremy Mayfield	Evernham Motorsports	Dodge	90	9	running	123	$53,795
16	12	48	Jimmie Johnson (R)	Hendrick Motorsports	Chevrolet	90	0	running	115	$44,000
17	10	2	Rusty Wallace	Penske Racing	Ford	90	5	running	117	$83,905
18	20	77	Dave Blaney	Jasper Motorsports	Ford	90	0	running	109	$64,010
19	11	55	Bobby Hamilton	Andy Petree Racing	Chevrolet	90	5	running	111	$61,230
20	18	22	Ward Burton	Bill Davis Racing	Dodge	90	0	running	103	$85,670
21	4	9	Bill Elliott	Evernham Motorsports	Dodge	90	0	running	100	$68,436
22	23	24	Jeff Gordon	Hendrick Motorsports	Chevrolet	90	0	running	97	$91,928
23	24	18	Bobby Labonte	Joe Gibbs Racing	Pontiac	90	0	running	94	$84,598
24	40	23	Tom Hubert	Bill Davis Racing	Dodge	90	0	running	91	$41,925
25	39	10	Johnny Benson Jr.	MBV Motorsports	Pontiac	90	0	running	88	$68,930
26	35	44	Jerry Nadeau	Petty Enterprises	Dodge	90	0	running	85	$49,999
27	26	7	Casey Atwood	Ultra-Evernham Motorsports	Dodge	90	0	running	82	$41,490
28	41	36	Ken Schrader	MB2 Motorsports	Pontiac	90	0	running	79	$48,920
29	34	45	Kyle Petty	Petty Enterprises	Dodge	90	0	running	76	$38,350
30	28	40	Sterling Marlin	Chip Ganassi Racing	Dodge	90	1	running	78	$81,097
31	38	5	Terry Labonte	Hendrick Motorsports	Chevrolet	90	0	running	70	$67,043
32	31	11	Brett Bodine	Brett Bodine Racing	Ford	89	0	running	67	$38,135
33	8	17	Matt Kenseth	Roush Racing	Ford	89	0	running	64	$56,075
34	37	32	Ricky Craven	PPI Motorsports	Ford	89	0	running	61	$46,040
35	21	8	Dale Earnhardt Jr.	Dale Earnhardt, Inc.	Chevrolet	84	0	running	58	$57,605
36	42	98	Kenny Wallace	Innovative Motorsports	Chevrolet	82	0	crash	55	$37,945
37	17	88	Dale Jarrett	Robert Yates Racing	Ford	75	0	transmission	52	$57,860
38	33	25	Joe Nemechek	Hendrick Motorsports	Chevrolet	69	0	crash	49	$45,800
39	36	1	Steve Park	Dale Earnhardt, Inc.	Chevrolet	65	0	running	46	$67,640
40	22	4	Mike Skinner	Morgan–McClure Motorsports	Chevrolet	63	0	engine	43	$37,705
41	9	97	Kurt Busch	Roush Racing	Ford	51	0	engine	40	$45,660
42	43	74	Joe Varde	BACE Motorsports	Chevrolet	49	0	clutch	37	$37,610
43	32	21	Elliott Sadler	Wood Brothers Racing	Ford	35	0	clutch	34	$45,583
Official race results

Previous race: 2002 Brickyard 400	NASCAR Winston Cup Series; 2002 season	Next race: 2002 Pepsi 400 presented by Farmer Jack
