= 1999 Firestone Firehawk 500K =

(Japan) 1999 Firestone Firehawk 500K
Race details
- Race 2 of 20 in the 1999 CART season
- Twin Ring Motegi
- Date: April 10, 1999
- Official name: 1999 Firestone Firehawk 500K
- Location: Twin Ring Motegi, Motegi, Tochigi, Japan
- Course: Permanent oval course 1.549 mi / 2.493 km
- Distance: 201 laps 311.349 mi / 501.093 km
- Weather: Dry

Pole position
- Driver: (Brazil) Gil de Ferran (Walker Racing)
- Time: 25.463

Fastest lap
- Driver: (Brazil) Hélio Castro-Neves (Hogan Racing)
- Time: 25.830 (on lap 136 of 201)

Podium
- First: (Mexico) Adrián Fernández (Patrick Racing)
- Second: (Brazil) Gil de Ferran (Walker Racing)
- Third: (Brazil) Christian Fittipaldi (Newman-Haas Racing)

The 1999 Firestone Firehawk 500K was the second round of the 1999 CART FedEx Champ Car World Series season, held on April 9, 1999, on the Twin Ring Motegi in Motegi, Tochigi, Japan.

This was the first Champ Car race since the 1995 Indianapolis 500, in which Al Unser Jr. is absent on the starting grid.

== Report ==
=== Race ===
There was drama at the start when polesitter Gil de Ferran spun while taking the green flag. As a result, the start was delayed, and de Ferran was able to take back his starting position: pole. He led the early stages but then began to drop back with tire problems and Maurício Gugelmin took the lead. Gugelmin led comfortably until the first round of stops, when he overshot his pitlane, losing time. He was also given a black flag for running over pit equipment, which put him a lap down and out of contention. Adrián Fernández took the lead and led comfortably until Juan Pablo Montoya closed right up to him. Fernández held him off, and Montoya's challenge was ended when he lost three laps due to a fuel pick-up problem. In the final stages of the race, it seemed clear that everyone had to pit for fuel, and a caution brought out by Max Papis's spin was ideal. All the leaders pitted, except Fernández who for some reason stayed out. It seemed to be a mistake, as the race went green with 4 laps left, and he did not have enough fuel for 4 green-flag laps. However, Greg Moore, running second, spun while lapping backmarkers, which resulted in Richie Hearn crashing, and the caution came out again. Whereas the spin dropped Moore to fourth, the caution was till the end of the race, which meant that Fernández did not have to stop, and thus won the race. de Ferran recovered to finish second, and Christian Fittipaldi completed the podium.

== Classification ==
=== Race ===
Pos	No	Driver	Team	Laps	Time/Retired	Grid	Points
1	40	(Mexico) Adrián Fernández	Patrick Racing	201	1:46:01.463	4	20+1
2	5	(Brazil) Gil de Ferran	Walker Racing	201	+6.347	1	16+1
3	11	(Brazil) Christian Fittipaldi	Newman-Haas Racing	201	+7.669	7	14
4	99	(Canada) Greg Moore	Forsythe Racing	201	+38.027	6	12
5	6	(United States) Michael Andretti	Newman-Haas Racing	200	+1 Lap	5	10
6	44	(Brazil) Tony Kanaan	Forsythe Racing	200	+1 Lap	17	8
7	17	(Brazil) Maurício Gugelmin	PacWest Racing	200	+1 Lap	2	6
8	22	(United States) Robby Gordon	Team Gordon	200	+1 Lap	14	5
9	9	(Brazil) Hélio Castro-Neves	Hogan Racing	199	+2 Laps	18	4
10	10	(United States) Richie Hearn	Della Penna Motorsports	198	Contact	21	3
11	26	(Canada) Paul Tracy	Team Green	198	+3 Laps	10	2
12	12	(United States) Jimmy Vasser	Chip Ganassi Racing	198	+3 Laps	12	1
13	4	(Colombia) Juan Pablo Montoya	Chip Ganassi Racing	197	+4 Laps	15	
14	2	(Brazil) Tarso Marques	Team Penske	197	+4 Laps	22	
15	20	(United States) P. J. Jones	Patrick Racing	196	+5 Laps	9	
16	7	(Italy) Max Papis	Team Rahal	196	+5 Laps	3	
17	36	(United States) Alex Barron	All American Racing	195	+6 Laps	19	
18	19	(Mexico) Michel Jourdain Jr.	Payton/Coyne Racing	188	+13 Laps	26	
19	71	(Brazil) Luiz Garcia Jr.	Payton/Coyne Racing	184	Engine	25	
20	16	(Japan) Shigeaki Hattori	Bettenhausen Racing	140	Clutch	24	
21	24	(United States) Scott Pruett	Arciero-Wells Racing	106	Fire	20	
22	27	(United Kingdom) Dario Franchitti	Team Green	91	Contact	11	
23	8	(United States) Bryan Herta	Team Rahal	84	Electrical	8	
24	18	(United Kingdom) Mark Blundell	PacWest Racing	78	Handling	16	
25	25	(Brazil) Cristiano da Matta	Arciero-Wells Racing	39	Transmission	23	
26	33	(Canada) Patrick Carpentier	Forsythe Racing	10	Fuel pressure	13	

== Caution flags ==
Laps	Cause
1-4	de Ferran (5) spin
89-96	Franchitti (27) contact
140-148	Debris on track
194-198	Papis (7) spin
200-201	Moore (99) spin

== Lap Leaders ==
Laps	Leader
1	Maurício Gugelmin
2-26	Gil de Ferran
27-46	Maurício Gugelmin
47-50	Adrián Fernández
51-52	Scott Pruett
53-201	Adrián Fernández

Driver	Laps led
Adrián Fernández	153
Gil de Ferran	25
Maurício Gugelmin	21
Scott Pruett	2

== Point standings after race ==
Pos	Driver	Points
1	(Canada) Greg Moore	34
2	(United States) Michael Andretti	26
3	(Brazil) Gil de Ferran	25
4	(Mexico) Adrián Fernández	21
5	(Brazil) Christian Fittipaldi	18
