= 1998 Miller Lite 200 =

(United States) 1998 Mid-Ohio
Race details
- Race 13 of 19 in the 1998 CART season
- Mid-Ohio Sports Car Course
- Date: August 9, 1998
- Official name: 1998 Miller Lite 200
- Location: Mid-Ohio Sports Car Course; Lexington, Ohio, United States
- Course: Permanent road course 2.258 mi / 3.634 km
- Distance: 83 laps 187.414 mi / 301.622 km
- Weather: Dry

Pole position
- Driver: (United Kingdom) Dario Franchitti (Team KOOL Green)
- Time: 1:05.679

Fastest lap
- Driver: (Canada) Greg Moore (Forsythe Racing)
- Time: 1:08.287 (on lap 47 of 83)

Podium
- First: (Mexico) Adrián Fernández (Patrick Racing)
- Second: (United States) Scott Pruett (Patrick Racing)
- Third: (United States) Bobby Rahal (Team Rahal)

The 1998 Miller Lite 200 was the thirteenth round of the 1998 CART FedEx Champ Car World Series season, held on August 9, 1998, at the Mid-Ohio Sports Car Course in Lexington, Ohio. The race was notable for many crashes, including one involving Michael Andretti and P. J. Jones that sent the former into a series of barrel rolls, although he walked out unhurt. It was won by Adrián Fernández, his third career win and second of the season and giving Ford Cosworth their 300th career win. Also this marks the 88th and final podium for Bobby Rahal.

== Classification ==
=== Race ===
Pos	No	Driver	Team	Laps	Time/Retired	Grid	Points
1	40	(Mexico) Adrián Fernández	Patrick Racing	83	1:53:39.270	5	20
2	20	(United States) Scott Pruett	Patrick Racing	83	+0.247	11	16
3	7	(United States) Bobby Rahal	Team Rahal	83	+2.417	16	14
4	17	(Brazil) Maurício Gugelmin	PacWest Racing Group	83	+8.806	4	12+1
5	26	(Canada) Paul Tracy	Team KOOL Green	83	+9.983	21	10
6	2	(United States) Al Unser Jr.	Marlboro Team Penske	83	+13.291	7	8
7	33	(Canada) Patrick Carpentier	Forsythe Racing	83	+13.790	21	6
8	21	(Brazil) Tony Kanaan	Tasman Motorsports Group	83	+14.654	18	5
9	5	(Brazil) Gil de Ferran	Walker Racing	83	+19.208	12	4
10	3	(Brazil) André Ribeiro	Marlboro Team Penske	83	+20.785	14	3
11	24	(United States) Robby Gordon	Arciero-Wells Racing	83	+21.269	25	2
12	1	(Italy) Alex Zanardi	Chip Ganassi Racing	83	+27.994	13	
13	11	(Brazil) Christian Fittipaldi	Newman-Haas Racing	83	+30.454	19	
14	25	(Italy) Max Papis	Arciero-Wells Racing	83	+31.000	24	
15	9	(Finland) JJ Lehto	Hogan Racing	82	+1 Lap	17	
16	36	(United States) Alex Barron	All American Racing	81	+2 Laps	26	
17	16	(Brazil) Hélio Castro-Neves	Bettenhausen Racing	80	Contact	20	
18	77	(West Germany) Arnd Meier	Davis Racing	75	+8 Laps	27	
19	18	(United Kingdom) Mark Blundell	PacWest Racing Group	70	Spun off	8	
20	98	(United States) P. J. Jones	All American Racing	55	Contact	28	
21	6	(United States) Michael Andretti	Newman-Haas Racing	55	Contact	10	
22	99	(Canada) Greg Moore	Forsythe Racing	52	Contact	6	
23	34	(Brazil) Gualter Salles	Payton/Coyne Racing	35	Spun off	23	
24	10	(United States) Richie Hearn	Della Penna Motorsports	30	Transmission	15	
25	8	(United States) Bryan Herta	Team Rahal	2	Radiator	3	
26	27	(United Kingdom) Dario Franchitti	Team KOOL Green	0	Contact	1	1
27	12	(United States) Jimmy Vasser	Chip Ganassi Racing	0	Contact	2	
28	19	(Mexico) Michel Jourdain Jr.	Payton/Coyne Racing	0	Contact	22	

Notes

1. – Alex Zanardi finished 12th, which would usually yield 1 point, but race officials docked him of the point for dangerous driving.

== Caution flags ==
Laps	Cause
1-5	Franchitti (27), Vasser (12), Herta (8), Jourdan Jr. (19), Papis (25) contact
15	Meier (77) spin
37-40	Salles (34) spin
53-54	Barron (36) spin
58-63	Jones (98), Andretti (6), Blundell (18) contact

== Lap Leaders ==
Laps	Leader
1-29	Maurício Gugelmin
30-52	Greg Moore
53-57	Gil de Ferran
58-83	Adrián Fernández

Driver	Laps led
Maurício Gugelmin	29
Adrián Fernández	26
Greg Moore	23
Gil de Ferran	5

== Point standings after race ==
Pos	Driver	Points
1	(Italy) Alex Zanardi	190
2	(United States) Jimmy Vasser	122
3	(Canada) Greg Moore	119
4	(Mexico) Adrián Fernández	110
5	(United States) Michael Andretti	92
