= Patrick Racing =

American automobile racing team

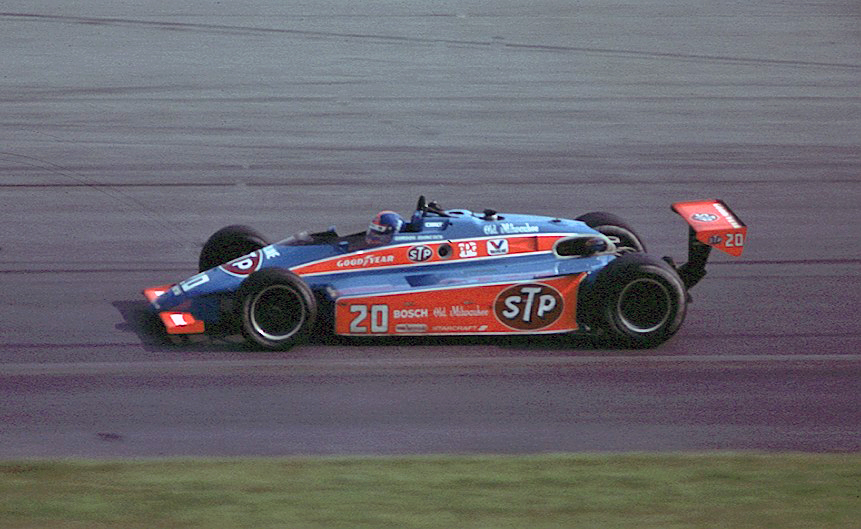
Gordon Johncock driving for Patrick Racing at Pocono in the familiar red and blue STP colors.

Patrick Racing was an auto racing team in USAC, CART, Champ Car and the Indy Racing League. Patrick Racing was started by U.E. "Pat" Patrick in the 1970s. The team is best known for winning the Indianapolis 500 on three occasions (1973, 1982, 1989), and the Indy car title twice (1976, 1989). Patrick Racing achieved 45 Indy car wins (19 in USAC and 26 in CART).

Noteworthy drivers that competed for Patrick include Gordon Johncock, Wally Dallenbach, Mario Andretti, Emerson Fittipaldi, Danny Sullivan, Roberto Guerrero, Scott Pruett, and Adrián Fernández. The team nearly notched a fourth victory at Indianapolis (with Andretti), the controversial 1981 race. After a lengthy protest and appeals process, Andretti eventually was placed second; Patrick would record three runner-up finishes at Indy (1981, 1986, 1988) alongside their three wins. The team fielded its own cars from 1975 to 1983 under the name Wildcat, and on a couple of occasions, fielded unique powerplants (the DGS and the Alfa-Romeo).

Over its history, the team had three distinct manifestations. The current-day Chip Ganassi Racing and Rahal Letterman Lanigan Racing are direct spin-offs from the first and second Patrick Racing organizations, respectively.

== Team statistics ==
=== Indy car champions ===
Year	Champion	Wins	Chassis	Engine	Tyres
1976	(United States) Gordon Johncock	2	Wildcat Mk I Wildcat Mk II	DGS	Goodyear
1989	(Brazil) Emerson Fittipaldi	5	Penske PC-17; Penske PC-18	Chevrolet A	Goodyear

=== Indianapolis 500 victories ===
Year	Champion	Chassis	Engine	Tyres
1973	(United States) Gordon Johncock	Eagle 72	Offenhauser	Goodyear
1982	(United States) Gordon Johncock (2)	Wildcat Mk.VIIIB	Cosworth DFX	Goodyear
1989	(Brazil) Emerson Fittipaldi	Penske PC-18	Chevrolet A	Goodyear

== History ==
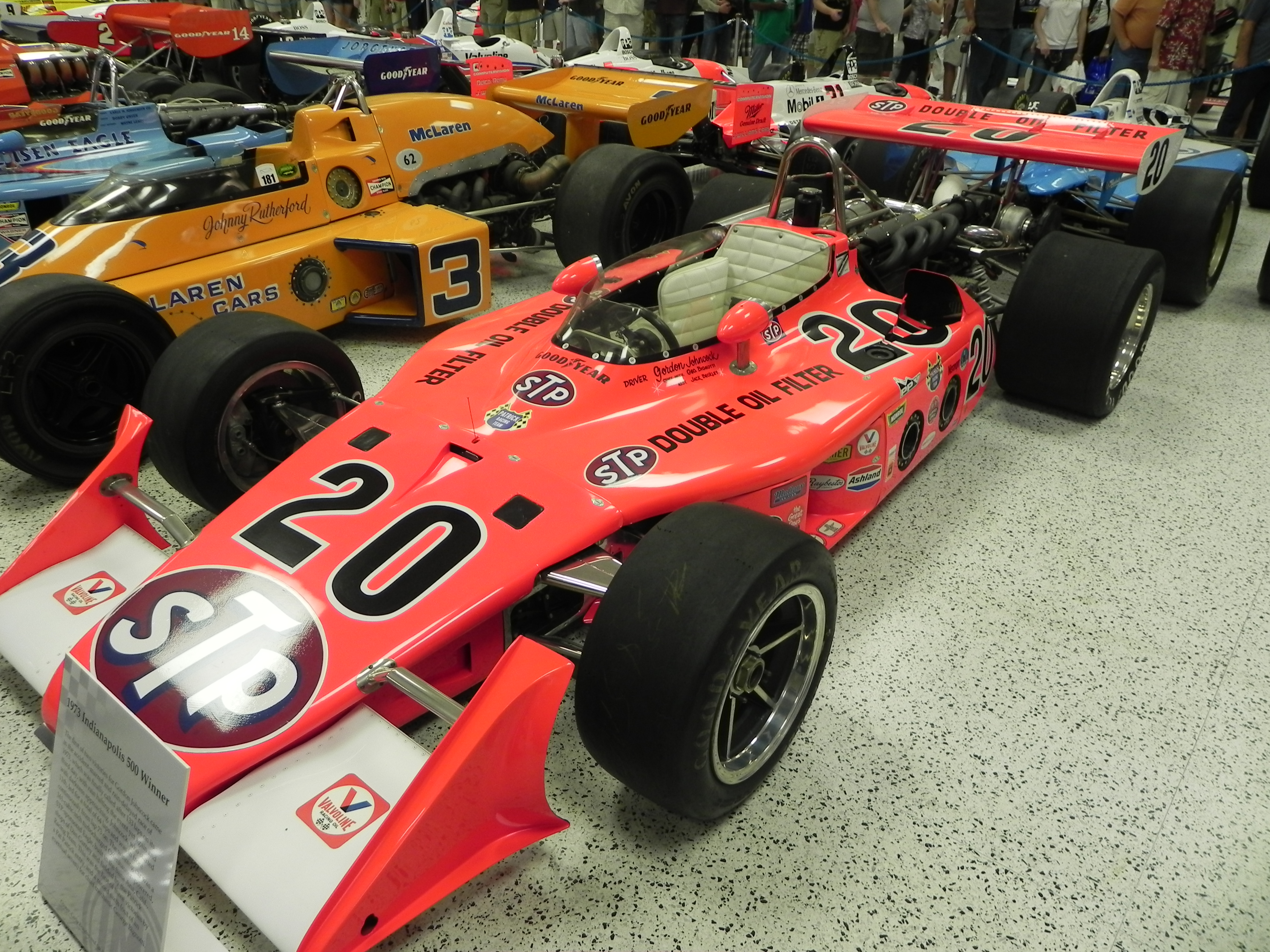
Gordon Johncock's 1973 Indianapolis 500 winning car.

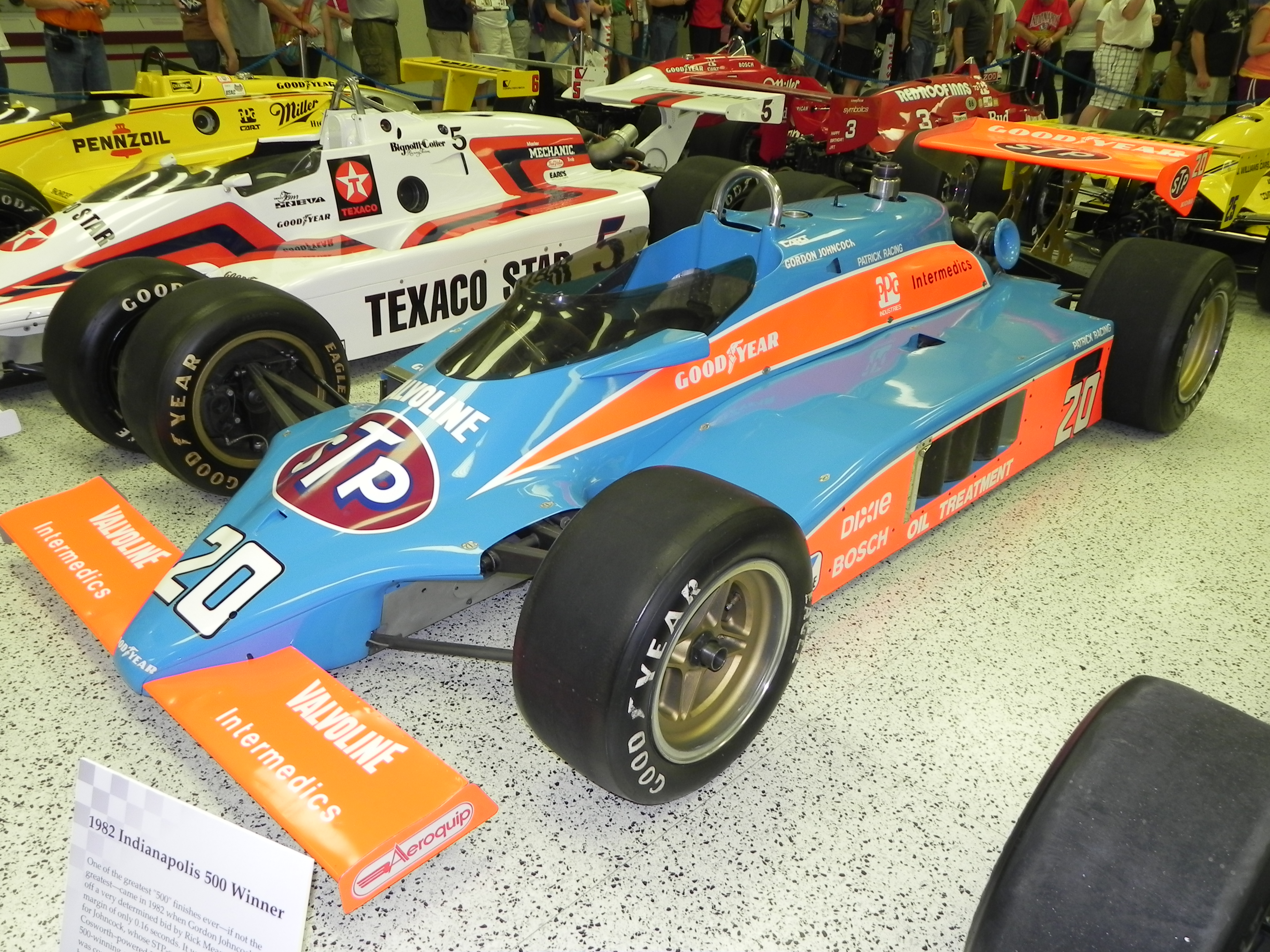
Gordon Johncock's 1982 Indianapolis 500 winning car.

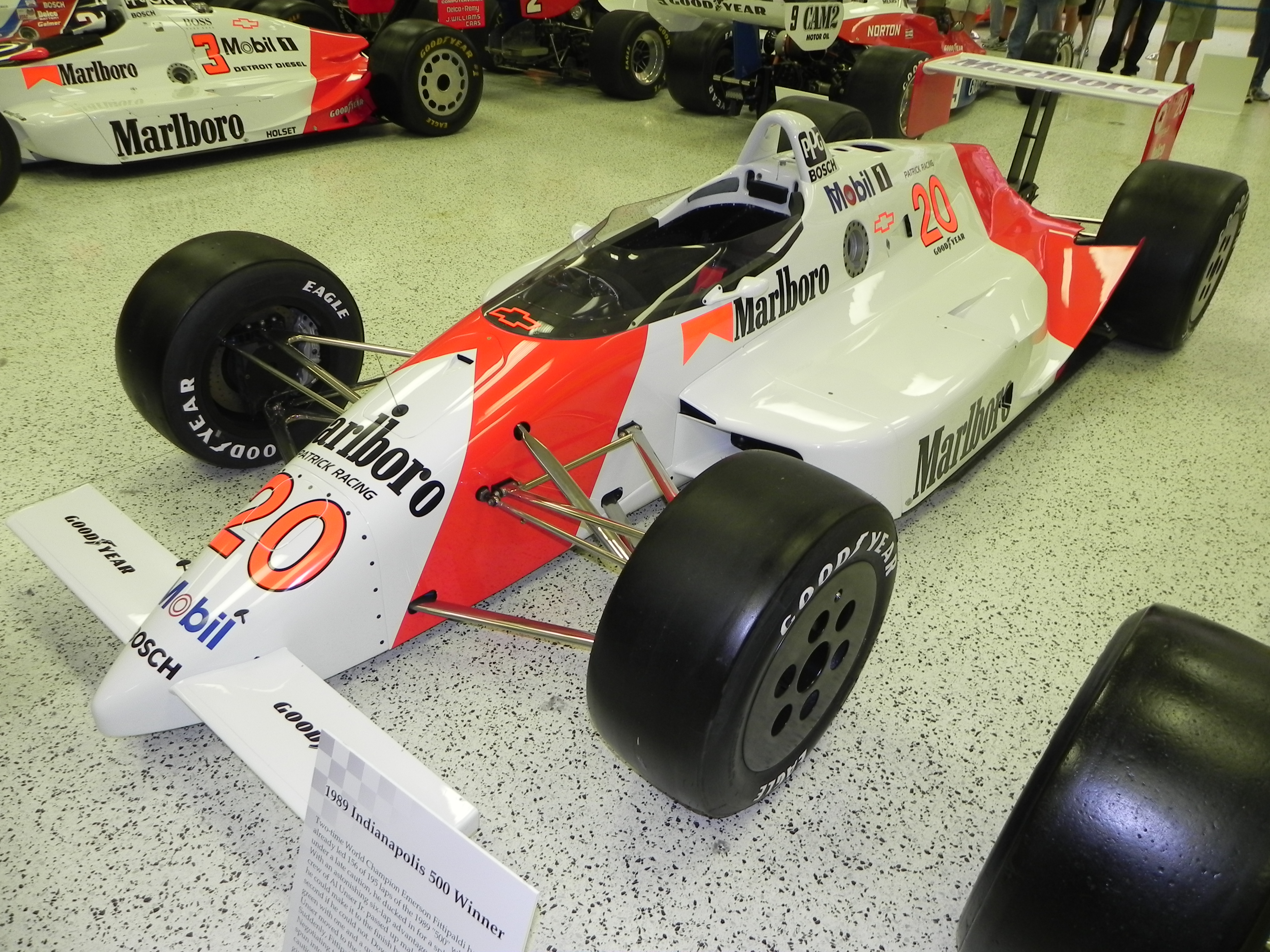
Emerson Fittipaldi's 1989 Indianapolis 500 winning car.

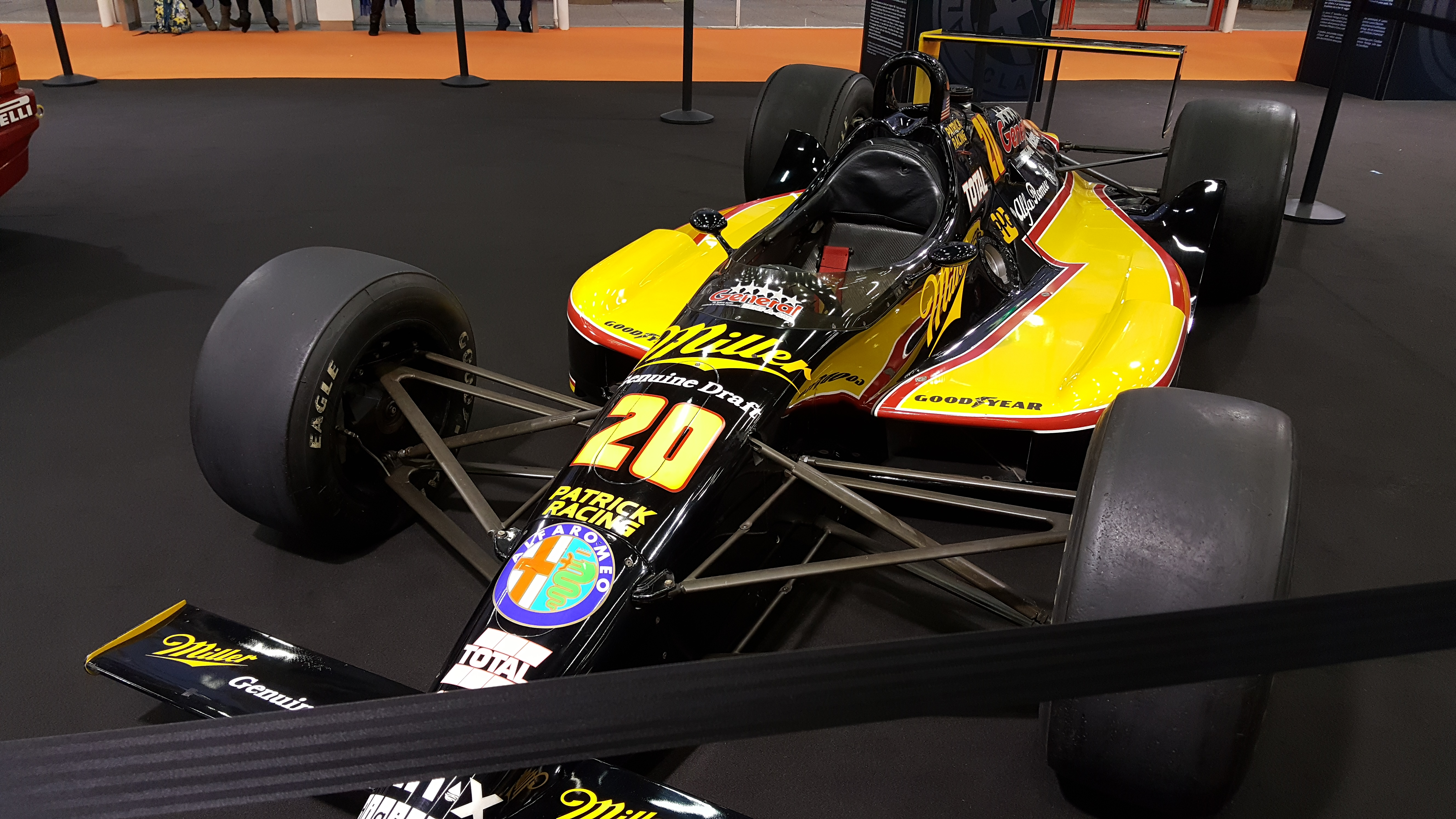
Danny Sullivan's car for the 1991 CART season

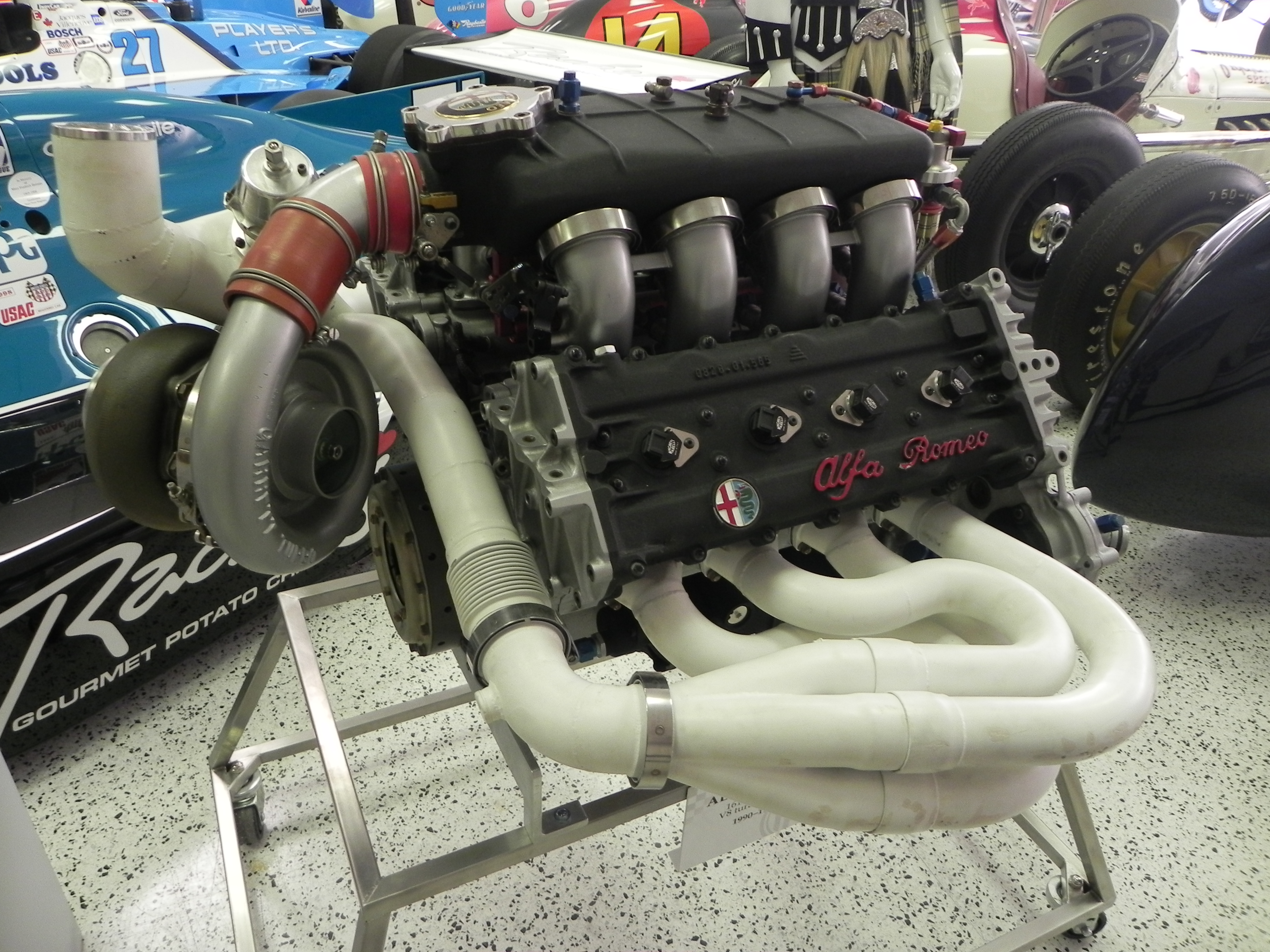
Alfa Romeo Indycar engine

=== First stint ===
Pat Patrick started his Indy Car racing career as a sponsor of the team fielded by fellow Jackson oilman Walt Michner in 1967. He became a co-owner of the team in 1970 and established Patrick Racing. Legendary chief mechanic George Bignotti joined the team in 1973–1980. During the 1970s and 1980s, Patrick Racing was often considered a chief rival to Penske Racing. The two teams battled one another, especially at Indianapolis, on multiple occasions.

The team won the 1973 and 1982 Indianapolis 500 with driver Gordon Johncock. Johncock also won the 1976 USAC National Championship. The team was closely associated with STP sponsorship, and was associated with Andy Granatelli during the time of the 1973 win. The 1973 win was tragic, however, as team driver Swede Savage suffered a devastating crash, and died about a month after the race. During the immediate aftermath of Savage's crash, pit crew member Armando Teran (of Graham McRae's car) was struck by a fire truck racing to the scene, and was fatally injured.

In 1975, Patrick Racing started an in-house chassis project, naming the car the Wildcat. It was powered by the DGS engine (Drake-Goossen-Sparks), which was an updated version of the venerable turbocharged 4-cyclinder Offenhauser. Wally Dallenbach came close to victory at Indianapolis. In 1975, he was leading the race when he suffered engine failure on lap 162. Just 12 laps later, the race ended early due to rain. In 1977, Gordon Johncock was leading late in the race, but dropped out with only 16 laps to go with a broken crankshaft.

In 1979, Pat Patrick was one of the founding owners of CART.

George Bignotti departed in 1981 to set up his own team, and was replaced by Jim McGee. Mario Andretti joined the team in 1981, and finished second at the controversial 1981 Indianapolis 500. Bobby Unser (Penske Racing) won the race, but Andretti was declared the winner when official results were posted the following morning. Unser was penalized for passing cars under the yellow on lap 149, elevating Andretti to first place. After a lengthy protest and appeals process, Unser was reinstated the victory in October of that year. In 1982, Andretti became caught up in the controversial Kevin Cogan crash at the start. Andretti was out of the race before the green flag. Gordon Johncock, however, avoided the melee and went on to win the race. It was widely considered one of the greatest Indy 500s in history, as Johncock held off Rick Mears (Penske Racing) by 0.16 seconds, the closest finish in Indy history to that point.

Gordon Johncock's final win with the team came in 1983 at Atlanta. Later in the season, he suffered season ending injuries in a crash at Michigan. Johncock would come back for 1984, but suffered another injury in a crash at Indy. He abruptly announced his retirement in 1985. Patrick would utilize several drivers in 1983–1985, including Chip Ganassi, Danny Ongais, Bruno Giacomelli, and Johnny Rutherford. Ganassi suffered a violent, nearly career-ending crash at Michigan in 1984. In late 1984, two-time World Driving champion Emerson Fittipaldi was hired as a replacement for Ganassi in the #40 car. After a three-year sabbatical from racing, Fittipaldi had come to Indy cars in 1984, attempting to restart his driving career.

Stability started to return to the team in 1985–1986. The Wildcat chassis program was retired, and the team switched to the customer March chassis. The team continued to run two cars, eventually settling on drivers Emerson Fittipaldi and Kevin Cogan. The team parted ways with STP, and 7-Eleven became their primary sponsor for 1985. In 1986, Marlboro joined the team, their first Indy car sponsorship program since 1971. Cogan achieved his first and only win of his career in 1986 at Phoenix. Fittipaldi won his first CART race, the Michigan 500, in 1985. Cogan finished a heartbreaking second place in the 1986 Indianapolis 500, after being passed with just over two laps to go.

For 1987, the team secured the use of the new Ilmor-Chevrolet V8 engine. Fittipaldi won two races, and finished 10th in points. Kevin Cogan on the other hand, had a disappointing season full of retirements, and parted ways with the team at season's end. After dropping back down to a one-car effort, Fittipaldi won two more races in 1988, finished 2nd at Indianapolis, and improved to 7th in points. The team was strengthened by the arrival of engineer Mo Nunn.

==== 1989–1990 "Trade" deal ====
In 1988, Chip Ganassi joined Pat Patrick as co-owner at Patrick Racing for Fittipaldi's #20 Marlboro entry. Speculation was emerging that Pat Patrick was planning to phase out his full-time ownership role, perhaps pursue a leadership position in CART, or even retire. Patrick himself mostly rebuffed the rumors, stating that bringing in Ganassi as an investor was merely a "business decision". Meanwhile, team sponsor Marlboro was nearing the end of their contract. Patrick was still in good standing with Ilmor, and would continue to field the Chevrolet engine.

A complex and multi-faceted "trade" deal between Patrick Racing and Penske Racing unfolded over a period of about two years, involving sponsors, drivers, and cars. There were persistent discussions about Marlboro departing Patrick, their desire to move over to Penske, and taking driver Emerson Fittipaldi with them. For 1989, an agreement was reached whereby Marlboro would stay for another season at Patrick and Penske would supply Patrick with two PC-18 chassis for Fittipaldi. In return, Penske would receive interim Marlboro sponsorship to field a third car for Al Unser Sr. at the three 500-mile races in 1989 (Indianapolis, Michigan, and Pocono).

The Patrick Racing team experienced dominating success in the 1989 CART season. Fittipaldi won the 1989 Indianapolis 500 and the 1989 CART championship. By the end of the season, Pat Patrick was faced with increasing uncertainty for 1990. Phillip Morris announced that the Marlboro sponsorship was moving over permanently to Penske. In October, just days after the season finale, Fittipaldi officially signed with Penske for 1990. That left Patrick without a driver and without sponsorship.

Over the next several weeks, Patrick Racing attempted to reorganize. Patrick had made a tentative handshake deal to take over the Alfa Romeo engine project from Alex Morales Motorsports. As a result, he would be dropping the dominant Ilmor-Chevrolet powerplant. Uninterested in taking on a risky upstart engine development program, Chip Ganassi (already the majority team owner) withdrew his support. By December, Pat Patrick and Chip Ganassi amicably split, and the original Patrick Racing team was sold outright to Ganassi.

In January 1990, Chip Ganassi took over the assets and the shop of the original Patrick Racing team including the two PC-18 chassis, and reinstated the Ilmor-Chevrolet engine lease. He hired former Formula One driver Eddie Cheever, secured sponsorship from Target, and renamed the outfit Chip Ganassi Racing.

=== Second stint ===
Almost immediately after splitting with Ganassi, Pat Patrick announced he was taking over the upstart Alfa Romeo Indy car project previously run by Alex Morales Motorsports. Roberto Guerrero signed on as primary driver with Al Unser Sr. scheduled to drive a second car at the Indianapolis 500 and the Michigan 500. The new Patrick Racing team landed primary sponsorship from Miller Genuine Draft. It was effectively another "trade" between Penske and Patrick, as Miller (previously with Penske) and Marlboro (now over at Penske) were owned by the same parent company, Phillip Morris. The services of Al Unser Sr. were yet another "trade" between the two outfits, as Unser had driven for Penske from 1983 to 1989. Guerrero, meanwhile, had been with Alex Morales Motorsports running the Alfa Romeo on a part-time schedule in 1989. Patrick moved into the shop formerly occupied by Morales in early 1990.

The team saw little on-track success, and even less in terms of engine development. This despite a significant investment by Alfa Romeo, and the retention of key crew members including Jim McGee and Mo Nunn. Like they had done for the Porsche Indy car team, March constructed a chassis specifically for the Alfa Romeo, the 90CA. By the halfway point of the season, however, Patrick dropped the uncompetitive March and switched to the Lola. Al Unser had to sit out the Michigan 500 after he wrecked in practice. He suffered a broken collarbone and a fractured right leg, then subsequently quit the team. Guerrero managed three top tens and placed 16th in points.

For 1991, Danny Sullivan took over as primary driver (also another former Penske driver), and the team continued to fail miserably. Guerrero stayed on as a second driver for the Indy 500 and other selected races. That year, Guerrero would be involved in a controversial crash at Indianapolis with Kevin Cogan. By the end of the 1991 CART season, Patrick was in financial and legal trouble. Rumors surfaced that the Patrick team had shipped one of the Ilmor Chevrolet V-8 engines over to the Alfa Romeo engine developers in Italy, who in turn, tore the engine down to examine it and allegedly stole design ideas. It was returned in pieces and infuriated Ilmor officials.

At the conclusion of the 1991 season, Danny Sullivan left the team, and was replaced by Bobby Rahal. Sullivan went to Rahal's old seat at Galles-Kraco Racing. Patrick's contractual obligations with Alfa Romeo had ended, so the team attempted to re-sign with Ilmor, or possibly acquire older Ilmor engines from Newman/Haas. Due to the possible fraudulent actions by Patrick against Ilmor, the team was refused an Ilmor Chevrolet engine lease, despite inking the popular Rahal. Facing a decidedly uncompetitive powerplant situation for 1992, and escalating legal problems, in December 1991, Patrick sold the team outright to Bobby Rahal and his partner Carl Hogan. They formed Rahal-Hogan Racing, which is now known as Rahal Letterman Lanigan Racing.

=== Third stint ===
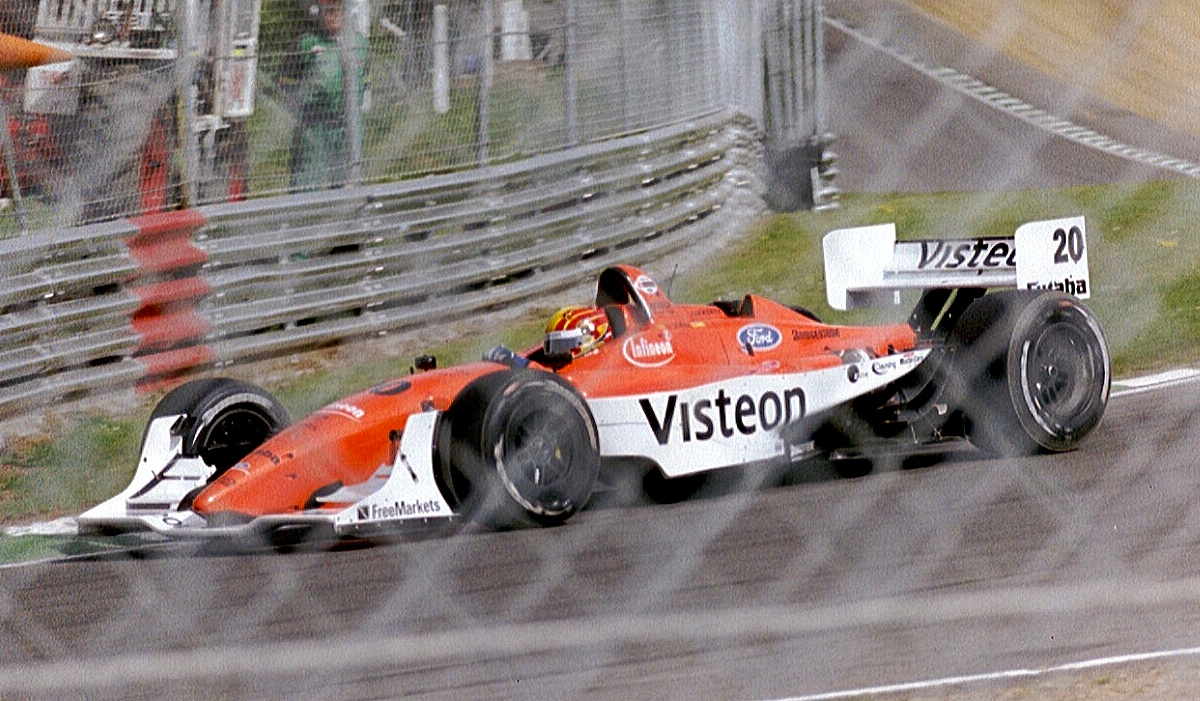
Oriol Servià competing for Patrick Racing at Brands Hatch in 2003.

In the mid-1990s, Patrick began to rebuild his team from scratch. In 1994, Patrick formed a testing team for Firestone tires, spearheading Firestone's return to Indy car racing. They did not enter any races in 1994, instead operated all year as a non-competing factory test outfit. Scott Pruett signed on as the driver. In 1995, they returned full time to CART competition, as the Firestone works team. A few other smaller teams ran Firestones as well. Pruett won the 1995 Marlboro 500, had three other podium finishes, and placed 7th in points.

In the next few years, Patrick experienced moderate success in CART. Pruett also won the 1997 Surfers Paradise event. After the 1999 season, Goodyear tires dropped out of Indy car racing. Firestone effectively became the exclusive tire supplier for both CART and IRL. As of 2025, Firestone continues to maintain that distinction in IndyCar.

Due to money issues and the constant uncertainty of racing in Champ Car, Patrick Racing jumped over the IRL in 2004. They ran Al Unser Jr. until his mid-season retirement and then Jeff Simmons, Jaques Lazier, and Tomáš Enge. With no sponsorship for 2005, the team ceased operations and the assets were put up for sale.

== CART drivers ==
- (United States) Mario Andretti (1981–1982)
- (United States) Tom Bagley (1980)
- (United States) Townsend Bell (2001–2002)
- (Brazil) Raul Boesel (1997)
- (United States) Pancho Carter (1984)
- (United States) Kevin Cogan (1986–1987)
- (United States) Wally Dallenbach Sr. (1979)
- (Mexico) Adrian Fernandez (1998–2000)
- (Brazil) Emerson Fittipaldi (1984–1990)
- (United States) Chip Ganassi (1983–1984)
- (United States) Spike Gehlhausen (1979)
- (Italy) Bruno Giacomelli (1984–1985)
- (Colombia) Roberto Guerrero (1990–1991)
- (United States) Gordon Johncock (1979–1984)
- (United States) P. J. Jones (1999)
- (United States) Steve Krisiloff (1981)
- (Denmark) Jan Magnussen (1999)
- (United States) Roger Mears (1979)
- (Brazil) Roberto Moreno (2000-2001)
- (United States) Danny Ongais (1983)
- (United States) John Paul Jr. (1984)
- (United States) Scott Pruett (1995–1998)
- (United States) Johnny Rutherford (1983)
- (Spain) Oriol Servia (2002–2003)
- (United States) Gordon Smiley (1980)
- (United States) Danny Sullivan (1991)
- (United States) Sammy Swindell (1985)
- (United States) Al Unser (1990)
- (United States) Jimmy Vasser (2001)
- (United States) Rich Vogler (1985)
- (United States) Don Whittington (1985)

== IRL drivers ==
- (Czech Republic) Tomáš Enge
- (United States) Jaques Lazier
- (United States) Jeff Simmons
- (United States) Al Unser Jr.

All IRL drivers drove in 2004 only.

== Racing results ==
=== Complete CART Series results ===
(key) (results in bold indicate pole position) (results in italics indicate fastest lap)

Year	Chassis	Engine	Drivers	No.	1	2	3	4	5	6	7	8	9	10	11	12	13	14	15	16	17	18	19	20	21	Pts Pos	Pos
1979					PHX	ATL		INDY	TRT		MCH		WGL	TRT	ONT	MCH	ATL	PHX									
1979	Penske PC-6	Cosworth DFX V8t	(United States) Gordon Johncock	20	1	4	9		**3**	5	1	**4**	3	16	15	13	2	4								3rd	**2,211**
1979	Penske PC-6	Cosworth DFX V8t	(United States) Gordon Johncock	3				6																		3rd	**2,211**
1979	Penske PC-6	Cosworth DFX V8t	(United States) Wally Dallenbach	6				27																		9th	**1,149**
1979	Penske PC-6	Cosworth DFX V8t	(United States) Wally Dallenbach	40					4	2	5	10		4	24	6	4	12								9th	**1,149**
1979	Wildcat Mk.V	Cosworth DFX V8t	(United States) Wally Dallenbach	40	7	11	8						14													9th	**1,149**
1979	Penske PC-6	Cosworth DFX V8t	(United States) Roger Mears	60											13											NC	—
1979	Penske PC-6	Cosworth DFX V8t	(United States) Steve Krisiloff	60												6										19th	**279**
1980					ONT	INDY	MIL	POC	MDO	MCH	WGL	MIL	ONT	MCH	MXC	PHX											
1980	Wildcat Mk.VI	Cosworth DFX V8t	(United States) Gordon Johncock	20	3																					6th	**1,572**
1980	Penske PC-6	Cosworth DFX V8t	(United States) Gordon Johncock	20		4				5																6th	**1,572**
1980	Phoenix 80	Cosworth DFX V8t	(United States) Gordon Johncock	20			**3**	DNQ	2		21	23	23	24	19	24										6th	**1,572**
1980	Penske PC-6	Cosworth DFX V8t	(United States) Tom Bagley	40	5																					11th	794
1980	Wildcat Mk.VI	Cosworth DFX V8t	(United States) Tom Bagley	40		28		29		8			15	8												11th	794
1980	Phoenix 80	Cosworth DFX V8t	(United States) Tom Bagley	40			23		DNS		6	4			18	16										11th	794
1980	Penske PC-6	Cosworth DFX V8t	(United States) Gordon Smiley	60	6																					33rd	**176**
1980	Phoenix 80	Cosworth DFX V8t	(United States) Gordon Smiley	70		25																				33rd	**176**
1981					PHX	MIL	ATL		MCH	RIV	MIL	MCH	WGL	MXC	PHX												
1981	Wildcat Mk.VIII	Cosworth DFX V8t	(United States) Gordon Johncock	20	6	**16**	4	4	36	2	6	5	10	3	3											4th	**142**
1981	Wildcat Mk.VIII	Cosworth DFX V8t	(United States) Mario Andretti	40	11	3	3	2				2*	**16***		4											11th	**81**
1981	Wildcat Mk.VIII	Cosworth DFX V8t	(United States) Steve Krisiloff	40					17		7															25th	**18**
1982					PHX	ATL	MIL	CLE	MCH	MIL	POC	RIV	ROA	MCH	PHX												
1982	Wildcat Mk.VIIIB	Cosworth DFX V8t	(United States) Gordon Johncock	20	5	2	**1***	5	1	11	6	26	22	15	23											4th	**186**
1982	Wildcat Mk.VIIIB	Cosworth DFX V8t	(United States) Mario Andretti	40	2	11	9	2	2	3	14	23	14	2	3											3rd	**188**
1983					ATL	INDY	MIL	CLE	MCH	ROA	POC	RIV	MDO	MCH	CPL	LAG	PHX										
1983	Wildcat Mk.IX	Cosworth DFX V8t	(United States) Gordon Johncock	20	1	14																				16th	**20**
1983	March 83C	Cosworth DFX V8t	(United States) Gordon Johncock	20			23	26	26																	16th	**20**
1983	Wildcat Mk.IX	Cosworth DFX V8t	(United States) Chip Ganassi	20						21																9th	**56**
1983	Wildcat Mk.IXB	Cosworth DFX V8t	(United States) Chip Ganassi	20										6	3	3	5									9th	**56**
1983	Wildcat Mk.IX	Cosworth DFX V8t	(United States) Chip Ganassi	60		8		13	8		26		25													9th	**56**
1983	Wildcat Mk.IX	Cosworth DFX V8t	(United States) Danny Ongais	60			12																			20th	**14**
1983	March 83C	Cosworth DFX V8t	(United States) Danny Ongais	20							24	10	5													20th	**14**
1983	March 83C	Cosworth DFX V8t	(United States) Danny Ongais	40				28	23	18																20th	**14**
1983	Wildcat Mk.IX	Cosworth DFX V8t	(United States) Johnny Rutherford	40	18	DNQ																				46th	**0**
1983	Wildcat Mk.IXB	Cosworth DFX V8t	(United States) Johnny Rutherford	40							21		DNP	23	24		20									46th	**0**
1984					LBH	PHX	INDY	MIL	POR	MEA	CLE	MCH	ROA	POC	MDO	SAN	MCH	PHX	LAG	CPL							
1984	Wildcat Mk.X	Cosworth DFX V8t	(United States) Gordon Johncock	20	11																					14th	**39**
1984	March 84C	Cosworth DFX V8t	(United States) Gordon Johncock	20		10	25	6	9	12	18	4	9	11	10	17	DNQ	13		DNS						14th	**39**
1984	Wildcat Mk.X	Cosworth DFX V8t	(United States) Chip Ganassi	40	25	11		11																		20th	**24**
1984	March 84C	Cosworth DFX V8t	(United States) Chip Ganassi	40			28		15	9	2	27														20th	**24**
1984	March 84C	Cosworth DFX V8t	(United States) John Paul Jr.	40									6													17th	**28**
1984	March 84C	Cosworth DFX V8t	(United States) Pancho Carter	40														7								21st	**22**
1984	March 84C	Cosworth DFX V8t	(Italy) Bruno Giacomelli	40															8							32nd	**5**
1984	March 84C	Cosworth DFX V8t	(Brazil) Emerson Fittipaldi	40											4	18	12			13						15th	**30**
1985					LBH	INDY	MIL	POR	MEA	CLE	MCH	ROA	POC	MDO	SAN	MCH	LAG	PHX	MIA								
1985	March 85C	Cosworth DFX V8t	(Italy) Bruno Giacomelli	20	18			10	5	10		22		6	16		6		14							19th	**32**
1985	March 85C	Cosworth DFX V8t	(United States) Gordon Johncock	20		Wth																				NC	—
1985	March 85C	Cosworth DFX V8t	(United States) Don Whittington	20		24	DNQ									20		24								50th	**0**
1985	March 85C	Cosworth DFX V8t	(United States) Sammy Swindell	20							23		25													53rd	**0**
1985	March 85C	Cosworth DFX V8t	(Brazil) Emerson Fittipaldi	40	2	13	8	3	2	8	1	5	6	8	25	13	24	8	26							6th	**104**
1985	March 85C	Cosworth DFX V8t	(United States) Rich Vogler	60		23																				54th	**0**
1986					PHX	LBH	INDY	MIL	POR	MEA	CLE	TOR	MCH	POC	MDO	SAN	MCH	ROA	LAG	PHX	MIA						
1986	March 86C	Cosworth DFX V8t	(United States) Kevin Cogan	7	1	17	2	12	14	21	23	5	22	2	4	4	4	20	9	14	4					6th	**115**
1986	March 86C	Cosworth DFX V8t	(Brazil) Emerson Fittipaldi	20	3	16	7	24	**12**	2	13	**17**	20	19	21	3	3	1	7	5	20					7th	**103**
1987					LBH	PHX	INDY	MIL	POR	MEA	CLE	TOR	MCH	POC	ROA	MDO	NAZ	LAG	MIA								
1987	March 86C	Buick 3300 V6t	(United States) Gordon Johncock	2			22																			46th	**0**
1987	March 86C	Buick 3300 V6t	(United Kingdom) Jim Crawford	2			Inj																			NC	—
1987	March 87C	Chevrolet 265A V8t	(United States) Kevin Cogan	7	18	21	31	18		12	21	13	27	9	19	5	5	18	21							16th	**25**
1987	March 87C	Chevrolet 265A V8t	(Brazil) Emerson Fittipaldi	20	19	18	16	7	14	3	1	1*	7	18	18	6	21	20	10							10th	**78**
1988					PHX	LBH	INDY	MIL	POR	CLE	TOR	MEA	MCH	POC	MDO	ROA	NAZ	LAG	MIA								
1988	March 88C	Chevrolet 265A V8t	(Brazil) Emerson Fittipaldi	20	21	16	2	3	3																	7th	**105**
1988	Lola T88/00	Chevrolet 265A V8t	(Brazil) Emerson Fittipaldi	20						19	4		19													7th	**105**
1988	Lola T87/00	Chevrolet 265A V8t	(Brazil) Emerson Fittipaldi	20								**14***		21	1*	1*	8	16	20							7th	**105**
1989					PHX	LBH	INDY	MIL	DET	POR	CLE	MEA	TOR	MCH	POC	MDO	ROA	NAZ	LAG								
1989	Penske PC-17	Chevrolet 265A V8t	(Brazil) Emerson Fittipaldi	20	5	3																				1st	**196**
1989	Penske PC-18	Chevrolet 265A V8t	(Brazil) Emerson Fittipaldi	20			1*	16	1	1*	1*	**2**	**2**	**14**	**19**	4	5	1*	5							1st	**196**
1990					PHX	LBH	INDY	MIL	DET	POR	CLE	MEA	TOR	MCH	DEN	VAN	MDO	ROA	NAZ	LAG							
1990	March 90CA	Alfa Romeo Indy V8t	(Colombia) Roberto Guerrero	20	16	14	23	18	21	8	19	15														16th	**24**
1990	Lola T90/00	Alfa Romeo Indy V8t	(Colombia) Roberto Guerrero	20										5	17	24	26	8	9	18						16th	**24**
1990	Lola T90/00	Alfa Romeo Indy V8t	(United States) Al Unser	40										DNS												35th	**0**
1990	March 90CA	Alfa Romeo Indy V8t	(United States) Al Unser	40			13																			35th	**0**
1991					SFR	LBH	PHX	INDY	MIL	DET	POR	CLE	MEA	TOR	MCH	DEN	VAN	MDO	ROA	NAZ	LAG						
1991	Lola T91/00	Alfa Romeo Indy V8t	(United States) Danny Sullivan	20	4	11	7	10	5	10	21	9	6	14	18	18	9	17	16	20	9					11th	**56**
1991	Lola T91/00	Alfa Romeo Indy V8t	(Colombia) Roberto Guerrero	40				30																		37th	**0**
1995					MIA	SFR	PHX	LBH	NAZ	INDY	MIL	DET	POR	ROA	TOR	CLE	MCH	MDO	NHA	VAN	LAG						
1995	Lola T95/00	Ford XB V8t	(United States) Scott Pruett	20	4	3	9	2	8	19	12	3	13	7	25	16	1	11	24	6	5					7th	**112**
1996					MIA	RIO	SFR	LBH	NAZ	500	MIL	DET	POR	CLE	TOR	MCH	MDO	ROA	VAN	LAG							
1996	Lola T96/00	Ford XD V8t	(United States) Scott Pruett	20	4	3	2	11	8	26	12	**10**	23	8	10	13	21	7	20	3						10th	**82**
1997					MIA	SFR	LBH	NAZ	RIO	GAT	MIL	DET	POR	CLE	TOR	MCH	MDO	ROA	VAN	LAG	FON						
1997	Reynard 97i	Ford XD V8t	(United States) Scott Pruett	20	5	1	3	10	3	19	9	24	**17**	8	5	**14**	9	5	18	16	7					9th	**102**
1997	Reynard 97i	Ford XD V8t	(Brazil) Raul Boesel	40	17	7	8	8	5	**14**	4	6	3	16	8	18	4	21	6	8	20					10th	**91**
1998					MIA	MOT	LBH	NAZ	RIO	GAT	MIL	DET	POR	CLE	TOR	MCH	MDO	ROA	VAN	LAG	HOU	SFR	FON				
1998	Reynard 98i	Ford XD V8t	(United States) Scott Pruett	20	5	21			18	5		9	2			4	2									6th	**121**
1998	Reynard 97i	Ford XD V8t	(United States) Scott Pruett	20			12	22			10			4	6			20	3	18	11	4	**20**			6th	**121**
1998	Reynard 97i	Ford XD V8t	(Mexico) Adrián Fernández	40			4		3			2	24			**23**			15							4th	**154**
1998	Reynard 98i	Ford XD V8t	(Mexico) Adrián Fernández	40	6	1*		26		18	9			5	9		1	5		7	6	6	4			4th	**154**
1999					MIA	MOT	LBH	NAZ	RIO	GAT	MIL	POR	CLE	ROA	TOR	MCH	DET	MDO	CHI	VAN	LAG	HOU	SRF	FON			
1999	Swift 010.c	Ford XD V8t	(Denmark) Jan Magnussen	20													18									24th	**8**
1999	Reynard 97i/98i/99i^{1}	Ford XD V8t	(Denmark) Jan Magnussen	20														14	24	7	17	13	11			24th	**8**
1999	Reynard 97i/98i/99i^{1}	Ford XD V8t	(United States) P. J. Jones	20	13	15																		12		17th	**38**
1999	Swift 010.c	Ford XD V8t	(United States) P. J. Jones	20			12	2	7	8	20	21	15	17	10	16										17th	**38**
1999	Reynard 97i/98i/91^{1}	Ford XD V8t	(United States) P. J. Jones	40														15	7	21						17th	**38**
1999	Reynard 97i/98i/91^{1}	Ford XD V8t	(Mexico) Adrián Fernández	40	20	1*		5	20	21	5	4	19	3	6	6	DNS				5	12	3	1		6th	**140**
1999	Swift 010.c	Ford XD V8t	(Mexico) Adrián Fernández	40			4																			6th	**140**
2000					MIA	LBH	RIO	MOT	NAZ	MIL	DET	POR	CLE	TOR	MCH	CHI	MDO	ROA	VAN	LAG	GAT	HOU	SRF	FON			
2000	Reynard 2Ki	Ford XF V8t	(Brazil) Roberto Moreno	20	2	9	6	3	14	5	17	2	**1***	13	23	6	11	4	10	25	3	11	19	2		3rd	**147**
2000	Reynard 2Ki	Ford XF V8t	(Mexico) Adrián Fernández	40	21	24	1	10	5	8	21	12	7	2	6	5	6	2	3	12	10	7	1*	5		2nd	**158**
2001					MTY	LBH	TXS	NAZ	MOT	MIL	DET	POR	CLE	TOR	MCH	CHI	MDO	ROA	VAN	LAU	ROC	HOU	LAG	SRF	FON		
2001	Reynard 01i	Toyota RV8F V8t	(United States) Townsend Bell	19																13	12					30th	**1**
2001	Reynard 01i	Toyota RV8F V8t	(Brazil) Roberto Moreno	20	27	11	C^{2}	12	10	15	3	2	8	11	12	20	6	11	1	23	13	22	22	**22***	19	13th	**76**
2001	Reynard 01i	Toyota RV8F V8t	(United States) Jimmy Vasser	40	6	5	C^{2}	4	5	21	18	16	5	26	23	14	23	21	19	15	7	11	5	6	12	12th	**77**
2002					MTY	LBH	MOT	MIL	LAG	POR	CHI	TOR	CLE	VAN	MDO	ROA	MTL	DEN	ROC	MIA	SFR	FON	MXC				
2002	Reynard 02i	Toyota RV8F V8t	(United States) Townsend Bell	20	19	15	14	13	7	4	12	15	18													20th	**19**
2002	Reynard 02i	Toyota RV8F V8t	(Spain) Oriol Servià	20										14	10	16	16	11	4	17	16	5	9			16th	**44**
2003					STP	MTY	LBH	BRH	LAU	MIL	LAG	POR	CLE	TOR	VAN	ROA	MDO	MTL	DEN	MIA	MXC	SFR					
2003	Lola B02/00	Ford XFE V8t	(Spain) Oriol Servià	20	12	18	12	4	5	2	6	5	6	5	16	18	18	2	3	19	13	19				7th	**108**

1. Patrick Racing used pieces of Reynard's 97i, 98i, and 99i chassis to create their own unique setup rather than the stock 99i. This setup became known as the "Franken-chassis."
2. The Firestone Firehawk 600 was canceled after qualifying due to excessive g-forces on the drivers.

=== Complete IRL IndyCar Series results ===
(key)

Year	Chassis	Engine	Drivers	No.	1	2	3	4	5	6	7	8	9	10	11	12	13	14	15	16	Pts Pos	Pos
2004					HMS	PHX	MOT	INDY	TXS	RIR	KAN	NSH	MIL	MCH	KTY	PPIR	NAZ	CHI	FON	TXS		
2004	Dallara IR-04	Chevrolet Indy V8	(United States) Al Unser Jr.	20				17	11	21											25th	**44**
2004	Dallara IR-04	Chevrolet Indy V8	(United States) Jeff Simmons **(R)**	20							19										29th	**26**
2004	Dallara IR-04	Chevrolet Indy V8	(United States) Jaques Lazier	20								21	17	18	15	8	14	18			22nd	**104**
2004	Dallara IR-04	Chevrolet Indy V8	(Czech Republic) Tomáš Enge **(R)**	20															16	13	27th	**31**

== IndyCar wins ==
#	Season	Date	Sanction	Track / Race	No.	Winning driver	Chassis	Engine	Tire	Grid	Laps Led
1	1973	May 30	USAC	Indianapolis 500 (O)	20	(United States) Gordon Johncock	Eagle 72	Offenhauser L4t 159 ci	G	11	64
2	1973	August 12	USAC	Milwaukee Mile (O)	40	(United States) Wally Dallenbach	Eagle 72	Offenhauser L4t 159 ci	G	Pole	50
3	1973	August 26	USAC	Ontario 500 Qualification Heat 1 (O)	40	(United States) Wally Dallenbach (2)	Eagle 72	Offenhauser L4t 159 ci	G	5	5
4	1973	September 2	USAC	Ontario 500 (O)	40	(United States) Wally Dallenbach (3)	Eagle 72	Offenhauser L4t 159 ci	G	5	49
5	1973	September 23	USAC	Trenton International Speedway (O)	20	(United States) Gordon Johncock (2)	Eagle 73	Offenhauser L4t 159 ci	G	Pole	81
6	1973	November 3	USAC	Phoenix International Raceway (O)	20	(United States) Gordon Johncock (3)	Eagle 73	Offenhauser L4t 159 ci	G	Pole	71
7	1974	August 11	USAC	Milwaukee Mile (O)	20	(United States) Gordon Johncock (4)	Eagle 74	Offenhauser L4t 159 ci	G	4	60
8	1974	November 2	USAC	Phoenix International Raceway (O)	20	(United States) Gordon Johncock (5)	Eagle 74	Offenhauser L4t 159 ci	G	4	74
9	1975	March 2	USAC	Ontario 500 Qualification Heat 2 (O)	40	(United States) Wally Dallenbach (4)	Eagle 74	Offenhauser L4t 159 ci	G	3	19
10	1975	September 21	USAC	Trenton International Speedway (O)	20	(United States) Gordon Johncock (6)	Wildcat I	DGS L4t 158 ci	G	3	33
11	1976	July 18	USAC	Michigan (O)	20	(United States) Gordon Johncock (7)	Wildcat II	DGS L4t 158 ci	G	2	44
12	1976	August 15	USAC	Trenton International Speedway (O)	20	(United States) Gordon Johncock (8)	Wildcat I	DGS L4t 158 ci	G	2	58
13	1977	April 30	USAC	Trenton International Speedway (O)	40	(United States) Wally Dallenbach (5)	Wildcat II	DGS L4t 158 ci	G	7	6
14	1977	September 14	USAC	Michigan (O)	20	(United States) Gordon Johncock (9)	Wildcat II	DGS L4t 158 ci	G	7	6
15	1977	October 29	USAC	Phoenix International Raceway (O)	20	(United States) Gordon Johncock (10)	Wildcat II	DGS L4t 158 ci	G	6	64
16	1978	March 18	USAC	Phoenix International Raceway (O)	20	(United States) Gordon Johncock (11)	Wildcat II	DGS L4t 158 ci	G	2	121
17	1978	April 23	USAC	Trenton International Speedway (O)	20	(United States) Gordon Johncock (12)	Wildcat II	DGS L4t 158 ci	G	4	79
18	1979	March 11	CART	Phoenix International Raceway (O)	20	(United States) Gordon Johncock (13)	Penske PC-6	Cosworth DFX V8t	G	8	33
19	1979	July 15	CART	Michigan (O)	20	(United States) Gordon Johncock (14)	Penske PC-6	Cosworth DFX V8t	G	3	20
20	1982	May 30	USAC	Indianapolis 500 (O)	20	(United States) Gordon Johncock (15)	Wildcat VIIIB	Cosworth DFX V8t	G	5	57
21	1982	June 13	CART	Milwaukee Mile (O)	20	(United States) Gordon Johncock (16)	Wildcat VIIIB	Cosworth DFX V8t	G	Pole	139
22	1982	July 18	CART	Michigan 500 (O)	20	(United States) Gordon Johncock (17)	Wildcat VIIIB	Cosworth DFX V8t	G	2	117
23	1983	April 17	CART	Atlanta Motor Speedway (O)	20	(United States) Gordon Johncock (18)	Wildcat IX	Cosworth DFX V8t	G	3	36
24	1985	July 28	CART	Michigan 500 (O)	40	(Brazil) Emerson Fittipaldi	March 85C	Cosworth DFX V8t	G	19	29
25	1986	April 6	CART	Phoenix International Raceway (O)	7	(United States) Kevin Cogan	March 86C	Cosworth DFX V8t	G	4	59
26	1986	October 4	CART	Road America (R)	20	(Brazil) Emerson Fittipaldi (2)	March 86C	Cosworth DFX V8t	G	5	7
27	1987	July 5	CART	Grand Prix of Cleveland (S)	20	(Brazil) Emerson Fittipaldi (3)	March 87C	Chevrolet V8t	G	5	37
28	1987	July 19	CART	Exhibition Place, Toronto (S)	20	(Brazil) Emerson Fittipaldi (4)	March 87C	Chevrolet V8t	G	3	67
29	1988	September 4	CART	Mid-Ohio Sports Car Course (R)	20	(Brazil) Emerson Fittipaldi (5)	Lola T87/00	Chevrolet V8t	G	6	62
30	1988	September 11	CART	Road America (R)	20	(Brazil) Emerson Fittipaldi (6)	Lola T87/00	Chevrolet V8t	G	4	35
31	1989	May 28	USAC	Indianapolis 500 (O)	20	(Brazil) Emerson Fittipaldi (7)	Penske PC-18	Chevrolet V8t	G	3	158
32	1989	June 18	CART	Detroit street circuit (S)	20	(Brazil) Emerson Fittipaldi (8)	Penske PC-18	Chevrolet V8t	G	3	4
33	1989	June 25	CART	Portland International Raceway (R)	20	(Brazil) Emerson Fittipaldi (9)	Penske PC-18	Chevrolet V8t	G	2	62
34	1989	July 2	CART	Grand Prix of Cleveland (S)	20	(Brazil) Emerson Fittipaldi (10)	Penske PC-18	Chevrolet V8t	G	2	54
35	1989	September 24	CART	Nazareth Speedway (O)	20	(Brazil) Emerson Fittipaldi (11)	Penske PC-18	Chevrolet V8t	G	2	123
36	1995	July 30	CART	Michigan 500 (O)	20	(United States) Scott Pruett	Lola T95/00	Ford-Cosworth XB V8t	F	12	58
37	1997	April 6	CART	Gold Coast Indy 300 (S)	20	(United States) Scott Pruett (2)	Reynard 97i	Ford-Cosworth XD V8t	F	7	16
38	1998	March 28	CART	Twin Ring Motegi (O)	40	(Mexico) Adrián Fernández	Reynard 98i	Ford-Cosworth XD V8t	F	2	102
39	1998	August 9	CART	Mid-Ohio Sports Car Course (R)	40	(Mexico) Adrián Fernández (2)	Reynard 98i	Ford-Cosworth XD V8t	F	5	26
40	1999	April 10	CART	Twin Ring Motegi (O)	40	(Mexico) Adrián Fernández (3)	Reynard 97i	Ford-Cosworth XD V8t	F	4	153
41	1999	October 31	CART	Auto Club Speedway (O)	40	(Mexico) Adrián Fernández (4)	Reynard 97i	Ford-Cosworth XD V8t	F	13	10
42	2000	April 30	CART	Autódromo de Jacarepaguá (O)	40	(Mexico) Adrián Fernández (5)	Reynard 2Ki	Ford-Cosworth XF V8t	F	16	11
43	2000	July 2	CART	Grand Prix of Cleveland (S)	20	(Brazil) Roberto Moreno	Reynard 2Ki	Ford XF V8t	F	Pole	91
44	2000	October 15	CART	Gold Coast Indy 300 (S)	40	(Mexico) Adrián Fernández (6)	Reynard 2Ki	Ford XF V8t	F	17	17
45	2001	September 2	CART	Streets of Vancouver (S)	20	(Brazil) Roberto Moreno (2)	Reynard 01i	Toyota RV8E V8t	F	7	10
