= 1999 Toyota Grand Prix of Long Beach =

(United States) 1999 Long Beach
Race details
- Race 3 of 20 in the 1999 CART season
- Long Beach track layout
- Date: April 18, 1999
- Official name: 1999 Toyota Grand Prix of Long Beach
- Location: Streets of Long Beach; Long Beach, California, United States
- Course: Temporary street circuit 1.824 mi / 2.935 km
- Distance: 85 laps 155.04 mi / 249.51 km
- Weather: Dry

Pole position
- Driver: (Brazil) Tony Kanaan (Forsythe Racing)
- Time: 1:01.109

Fastest lap
- Driver: (Colombia) Juan Pablo Montoya (Chip Ganassi Racing)
- Time: 1:02.779 (on lap 63 of 85)

Podium
- First: (Colombia) Juan Pablo Montoya (Chip Ganassi Racing)
- Second: (United Kingdom) Dario Franchitti (Team KOOL Green)
- Third: (United States) Bryan Herta (Team Rahal)

Chronology
Previous	Next
1998	2000

The 1999 Toyota Grand Prix of Long Beach was the third round of the 1999 CART FedEx Champ Car World Series season, held on April 18, 1999, on the streets of Long Beach, California.

This marks the first Long Beach Grand Prix without former Long Beach winners Bobby Rahal and Al Unser Jr. Rahal retired at the end of 1998, and Al Unser was injured in the inaugural race of the season.

== Report ==
=== Race ===
In qualifying, Tony Kanaan, the Rookie of the Year in 1998, took his first CART career pole after a close battle with Dario Franchitti. At the start, it was Bryan Herta who took the lead after passing both Kanaan and Franchitti at the first corner, but that did not last long, as both Kanaan and Franchitti passed Herta on the second lap. The duo pulled away and built a gap, whereas Herta was passed later in the stint by Juan Pablo Montoya. Montoya was running very quickly, and passed Franchitti at a restart later on and put pressure on Kanaan. As the laps went by, it was clear that Montoya was faster, and that Kanaan was under increasing pressure. On lap 46, the pressure told, as Kanaan made a mistake and crashed at Turn 6. Montoya took the lead and dominated the rest of the race to take his first career win ahead of Franchitti and Herta.

== Classification ==
=== Race ===
Pos	No	Driver	Team	Laps	Time/Retired	Grid	Points
1	4	(Colombia) Juan Pablo Montoya	Chip Ganassi Racing	85	1:45:48.688	5	20
2	27	(United Kingdom) Dario Franchitti	Team Green	85	+2.805	2	16
3	8	(United States) Bryan Herta	Team Rahal	85	+7.003	3	14
4	40	(Mexico) Adrián Fernández	Patrick Racing	85	+8.610	6	12
5	11	(Brazil) Christian Fittipaldi	Newman-Haas Racing	85	+8.831	11	10
6	5	(Brazil) Gil de Ferran	Walker Racing	85	+13.566	7	8
7	6	(United States) Michael Andretti	Newman-Haas Racing	85	+15.594	13	6
8	99	(Canada) Greg Moore	Forsythe Racing	85	+17.399	8	5
9	7	(Italy) Max Papis	Team Rahal	85	+17.718	4	4
10	12	(United States) Jimmy Vasser	Chip Ganassi Racing	85	+22.128	9	3
11	10	(United States) Richie Hearn	Della Penna Motorsports	85	+23.621	24	2
12	20	(United States) P. J. Jones	Patrick Racing	84	+1 Lap	15	1
13	18	(United Kingdom) Mark Blundell	PacWest Racing	84	+1 Lap	12	
14	17	(Brazil) Maurício Gugelmin	PacWest Racing	84	+1 Lap	14	
15	24	(United States) Scott Pruett	Arciero-Wells Racing	84	+1 Lap	20	
16	22	(United States) Robby Gordon	Team Gordon	84	+1 Lap	21	
17	33	(Canada) Patrick Carpentier	Forsythe Racing	84	+1 Lap	17	
18	19	(Mexico) Michel Jourdain Jr.	Payton/Coyne Racing	82	Fuel	23	
19	9	(Brazil) Hélio Castro-Neves	Hogan Racing	76	+9 Laps	18	
20	25	(Brazil) Cristiano da Matta	Arciero-Wells Racing	75	Contact	16	
21	26	(Canada) Paul Tracy	Team Green	48	Suspension	10	
22	44	(Brazil) Tony Kanaan	Forsythe Racing	45	Contact	1	1+1
23	36	(United States) Alex Barron	All American Racing	34	Brakes	22	
24	71	(Brazil) Luiz Garcia Jr.	Payton/Coyne Racing	28	Off course	27	
25	2	(Brazil) Tarso Marques	Team Penske	24	Contact	19	
26	16	(Japan) Shigeaki Hattori	Bettenhausen Racing	21	Contact	16	
27	34	(Brazil) Gualter Salles	Payton/Coyne Racing	17	Wing	25	

== Caution flags ==
Laps	Cause
24–26	Hattori (16) contact
28–31	Castro-Neves (9), Pruett (24), Marques (2) contact
47–52	Kanaan (44) contact
56–57	Jones (20) spin
78–81	da Matta (25) contact

== Lap leaders ==
Laps	Leader
1	Bryan Herta
2–45	Tony Kanaan
46–85	Juan Pablo Montoya

Driver	Laps led
Tony Kanaan	44
Juan Pablo Montoya	40
Bryan Herta	1

== Point standings after race ==
Pos	Driver	Points
1	(Canada) Greg Moore	39
2	(Mexico) Adrián Fernández	33
3	(Brazil) Gil de Ferran	33
4	(United States) Michael Andretti	32
5	(United Kingdom) Dario Franchitti	30

Preceded by 1998 Toyota Grand Prix of Long Beach	Grand Prix of Long Beach	Succeeded by 2000 Grand Prix of Long Beach
