= Pat Patrick (auto racing) =

American auto racing team owner (1929–2021)

Ueal Eugene "Pat" Patrick (March 10, 1929 – January 5, 2021) was an American racing team owner. He was the founder and owner of Patrick Racing, a team that competed in Indy car racing. Patrick was also one of the founding members of Championship Auto Racing Teams (CART) in 1978, and the Indy Lights series in 1986. In addition, he and LeRoy Scott were founders of Patrick Petroleum in 1962.

== Early life ==
Ueal Patrick was born in Kentucky in 1929, and moved at a young age to Jackson, Michigan. Patrick was initially an accountant, but left the field to go into oil exploration. Striking oil on its 19th attempt, Patrick Petroleum (later known as Patrick Energy) became a financial success.

== Motorsports career ==
Patrick started his Indy car racing career as a sponsor of the team fielded by fellow Jackson oilman Walt Michner in 1967. He became a co-owner of the team in 1970 and established Patrick Racing with LeRoy Scott, his partner in the oil business.

The Patrick Racing team won the 1973, 1982 and 1989 Indianapolis 500. Emerson Fittipaldi won the Indy car title for Pat in 1989. Drivers Adrian Fernandez and Roberto Moreno finished second and third in the 2000 series, which was the last time his cars were front-runners. He ran a car for Al Unser Jr. in the Indy Racing League in 2004, but after Unser's retirement, Patrick put the team up for sale at the end of the year.

Patrick resided in Jackson, Michigan, and Phoenix, Arizona. He died in Phoenix at 91 years old.

== Awards ==
Patrick was inducted into the Motorsports Hall of Fame of America in 2018.
