= Bryan Herta =

American racing driver (born 1970)

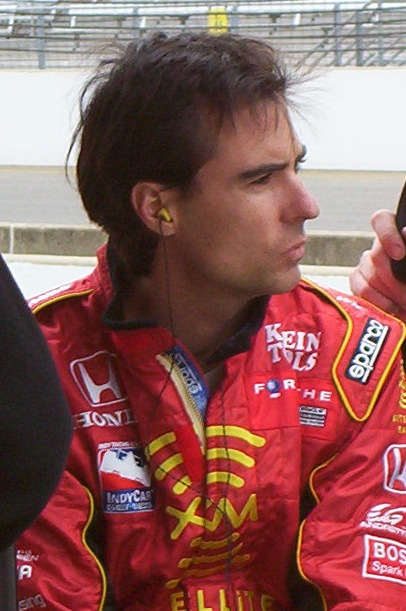
- Herta at the 2004 Indianapolis 500
- Nationality: (United States) American
- Born: Bryan John Herta; May 23, 1970 (age 56) Warren, Michigan, U.S.
- Relatives: Colton Herta (son)

Indy Racing League IndyCar Series
- Years active: 2003–2006
- Teams: Andretti Green Racing
- Starts: 58
- Wins: 2
- Poles: 3
- Best finish: 8th in 2005

CART Championship Car
- Years active: 1994–2001, 2003
- Teams: A. J. Foyt Enterprises; Chip Ganassi Racing; Team Rahal; Walker Racing; Mo Nunn Racing; Zakspeed/Forsythe Racing; PK Racing
- Starts: 121
- Wins: 2
- Poles: 7
- Best finish: 8th in 1996 & 1998

Previous series
- 2005–2006 1992–1993 1990–1991: A1 Grand Prix; Indy Lights; Barber Saab Pro Series

Championship titles
- 1993 1991: Indy Lights champion Barber Saab Pro Series champion

Bryan John Herta (born May 23, 1970) is an American race strategist and former race car driver. He currently runs his own team, Bryan Herta Autosport in the NTT IndyCar Series and is the strategist for the No. 27 for Andretti Autosport in the same series. His team won the 2011 Indianapolis 500 with driver Dan Wheldon and the 2016 Indianapolis 500 with driver Alexander Rossi. He is the father and former strategist of former IndyCar and now F2 driver Colton Herta.

== Racing career ==
=== CART/Champ Cars/IndyCars ===
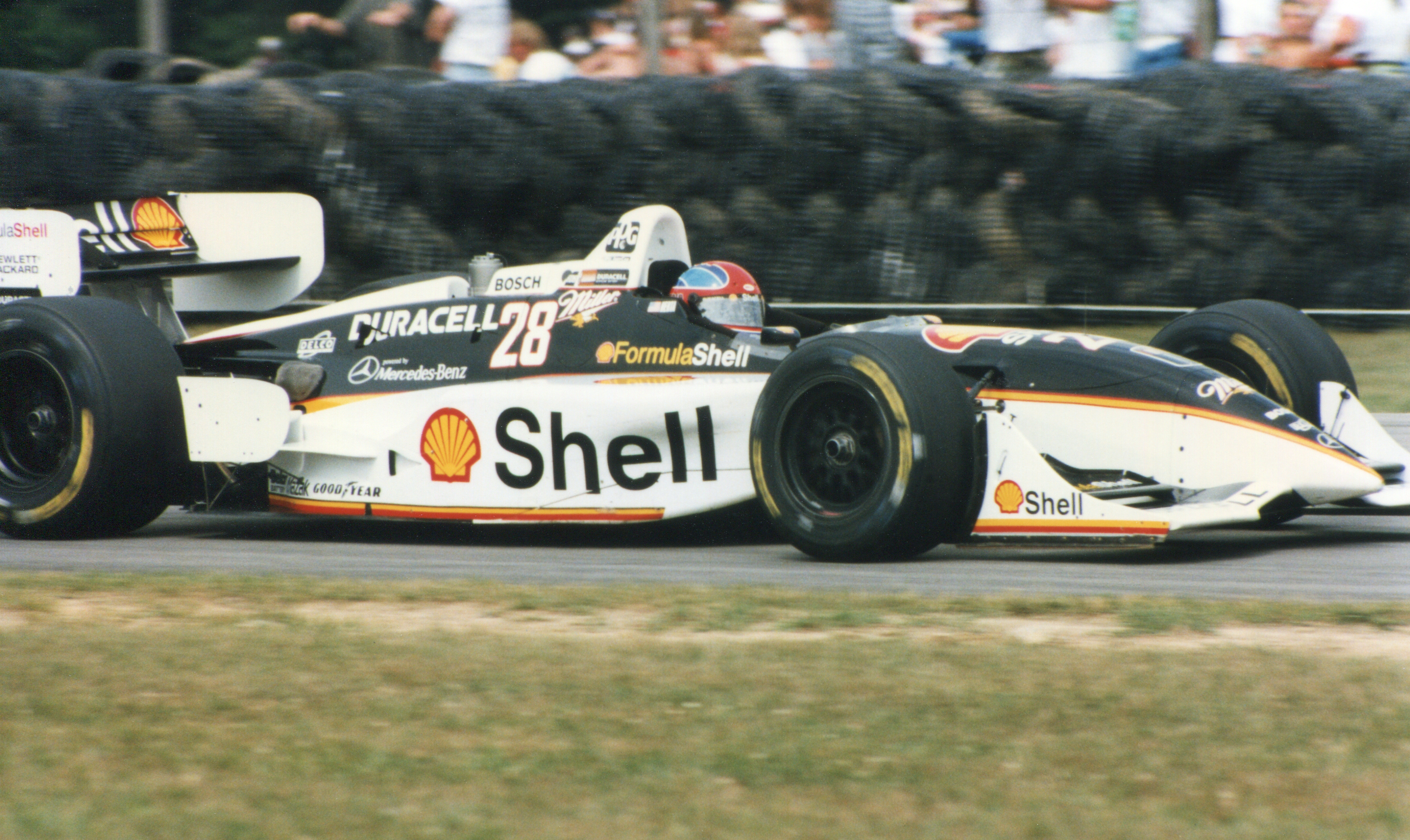
Bryan Herta driving for Team Rahal at Mid-Ohio Sports Car Course in 1996

Herta enjoyed considerable success in the lower formulae, winning the Barber Formula Ford and Barber Saab Pro Series, and dominating the 1993 Indy Lights championship with Tasman Motorsports, race engineered by Gerald Tyler.

Herta graduated to IndyCar racing in 1994 with team owner A. J. Foyt, where he had several promising races before suffering a season-ending injury at Toronto.

In 1995, Herta was hired to drive for Chip Ganassi Racing. Despite a pole at Phoenix, the association was unsuccessful, with Herta managing only a twentieth place in the series standings while his teammate Jimmy Vasser finished 8th. Even so, Herta landed a top ride with Team Rahal for the 1996 season.

During the next few years, Herta developed a reputation for his prowess on road courses, especially at Laguna Seca Raceway. In 1996, he was the leader until the last lap, when Alex Zanardi made a pass through the "Corkscrew" chicane and took the victory. Herta, who rarely qualified below the first row at Laguna Seca, won two events at the circuit in 1998 and 1999. At the height of Herta's career, fan interest in the Shell-sponsored driver was dubbed "Hertamania" by team owner David Letterman.

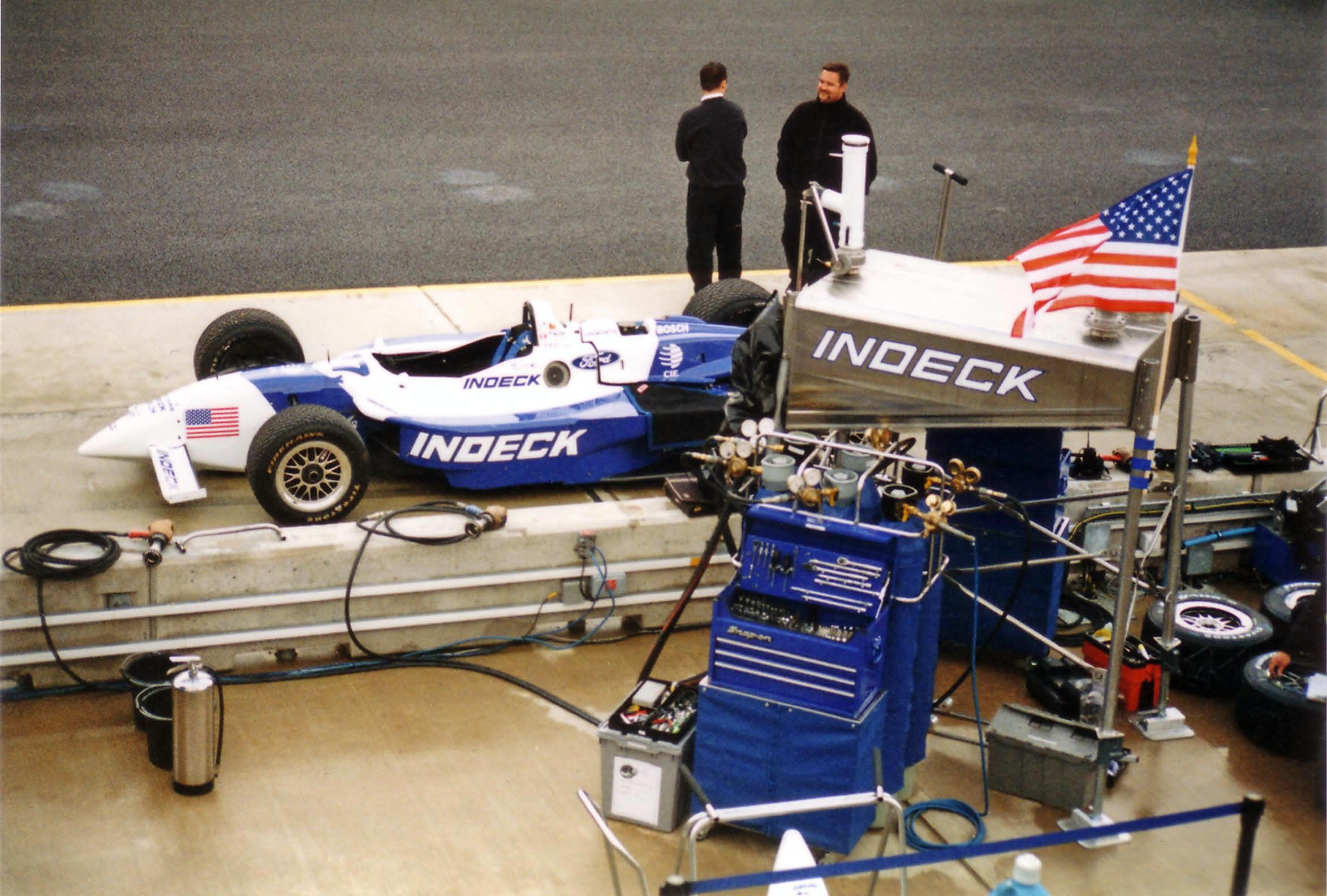
Bryan Herta's #77 Forsythe Championship Racing car in 2001

In the opening laps of the 1998 event at Elkhart Lake, Wisconsin's Road America circuit, Herta was involved in a major accident. In the 4-mile (6.4 km) road course's fifth turn, Herta got too close to the back of the car of co-owner Rahal, and spun out into a paved runoff area, facing oncoming traffic. A few seconds later, Alex Barron slid into the front of Herta's car and rode up on top of it. Both drivers were uninjured; Herta reported that Barron's car had actually hit his hands, only inches from his face.

From 2000 to 2003, Herta drove for a variety of Champ Car teams including Forsythe Championship Racing, Mo Nunn Racing, and PK Racing, but never quite regained his form from the late 1990s. In 2002, Herta drove an F1 car for the first time, piloting a Minardi at the "Thunder in the Park" event held at Donington Park. This led to speculation that he would test and even race for Minardi in F1.

=== IRL IndyCar Series ===
After dabbling in sports cars, Herta revitalized his open-wheel racing career by substituting for an injured Dario Franchitti halfway through the 2003 IRL season.

In just his third IRL start, Herta picked up his first IndyCar Series win at Kansas Speedway for Andretti Green Racing. He was retained in an expanded four-car squad in 2004, usually running development engines. On July 31, 2005, Herta took his second and final IndyCar Series win, defeating AGR teammate Dan Wheldon in a close finish in the Firestone Indy 400 at the Michigan International Speedway.

In early 2006, Herta drove at Mazda Raceway Laguna Seca and Fundidora Park for A1 Team USA in the A1 Grand Prix series before returning to Andretti Green for the IRL season.

Across his career, Herta started in the Indianapolis 500 five times (1994–1995, 2004–2006) with three top-ten finishes, including a best of third in 2005. Herta had his helmets painted by AliveDesignCo.com.

=== Sports cars ===
On October 31, 2006, Herta was confirmed as a driver for Andretti Green Racing's new Acura Le Mans prototype program for the 2007 American Le Mans Series season. He shared the car with Marino Franchitti, brother of his former teammate Dario Franchitti. On January 3, 2007, it was announced that Dario would also drive a limited ALMS programme with both Marino and Herta. Herta finished the season seventh in driver points with one class win. He also drove for A1 Team USA. At the event in Australia, Herta scored a tenth place finish.

== After racing ==
Since retiring from racing, Herta served as a driver coach for Vision Racing and founded a Firestone Indy Lights Series team named Bryan Herta Autosport, which has a technical alliance with Vision Racing's Indy Lights team. In 2009, the team fielded a full-time entry for Daniel Herrington. The team campaigned Sebastián Saavedra for eleven races of the 2010 Firestone Indy Lights season and the Indianapolis 500. In 2011 the team fielded a car for Dan Wheldon in the 2011 Indianapolis 500 which resulted in a stunning victory, and a full-time entry in Indy Lights for Duarte Ferreira.

For the 2012 IZOD IndyCar Series season, Alex Tagliani ran the 500. The team switched to a Honda powered DW12 in May 2012 for the remainder of the season.

In 2016, Herta partnered with Michael Andretti as a co-owner and won the 2016 Indianapolis 500. Their car was driven by series rookie Alexander Rossi.

Herta's son, Colton, is also a racing driver, and made his IndyCar debut in 2019 with Harding Steinbrenner Racing. In March 2019, Colton became the youngest ever IndyCar winner in the second round at the Circuit of the Americas.

Herta is now the race strategist of his son's teammate, Kyle Kirkwood.

== Personal life ==
Herta and his wife Janette Michele (née Fountaine) have three children: Calysta, Colton, and Caden.

== Career racing results ==
=== American Open Wheel ===
(key)

==== Indy Lights ====
Year	Team	1	2	3	4	5	6	7	8	9	10	11	12	Rank	Points
1992	Landford Racing	PHX; 16	LBH; 13	DET; 7	POR; 7	MIL; 6	NHA; 4	TOR; 1	CLE; 2	VAN; 5	MDO; 4	NAZ; 3	LS; 2	**5th**	**120**
1993	Tasman Motorsports	**PHX**; 2	LBH; 3	MIL; 1	**DET**; 2	**POR**; 4	**CLE**; 1	TOR; 1	**NHA**; 13	VAN; 1	**MDO**; 1	**NAZ**; 1	**LS**; 1	**1st**	**213**

==== CART results ====
Year	Team	No.	Chassis	Engine	1	2	3	4	5	6	7	8	9	10	11	12	13	14	15	16	17	18	19	20	21	Rank	Points	Ref
1994	A. J. Foyt Enterprises	14	Lola T94/00	Ford XB V8t	SRF	PHX	LBH	INDY; 9	MIL; 10	DET; 9	POR; 27	CLE; 13	TOR; DNS	MIS	MDO	NHM	VAN	ROA	NZR	LS						23rd	11	
1995	Chip Ganassi Racing	4	Reynard 95i	Ford XB V8t	MIA; 10	SRF; 15	**PHX**; 20	LBH; 26	NZR; 23	INDY; 13	MIL; 24	DET; 27	POR; 26	ROA; 14	TOR; 27	CLE; 2	MIS; 15	MDO; 5	NHM; 19	VAN; 16	LS; 25					20th	30	
1996	Team Rahal	28	Reynard 96i	Mercedes-Benz IC108C V8t	MIA; 10	RIO; 13	SRF; 17	LBH; 12	NZR; 11	500; 15	MIL; 14	DET; 13	POR; 26	CLE; 5	TOR; 6	MIS; 2	MDO; 4	ROA; 5	VAN; 6	LS; 2						8th	86	
1997	Team Rahal	8	Reynard 97i	Ford XD V8t	MIA; 10	SRF; 22	LBH; 6	NZR; 7	RIO; 6	STL; 22	MIL; 15	DET; 7	POR; 21	CLE; 3	TOR; 17	MIS; 5	**MDO**; 24	ROA; 11	VAN; 8	**LS**; 6	FON; 21					11th	72	
1998	Team Rahal	8	Reynard 98i	Ford XD V8t	MIA; 8	MOT; 28	**LBH**; 3	NZR; 8	RIO; 4	STL; 23	MIL; 11	DET; 21	**POR**; 3	CLE; 13	TOR; 5	MIS; 10	MDO; 25	ROA; 23	VAN; 22	**LS**; 1*	HOU; 8	SRF; 10	FON; 15			8th	97	
1999	Team Rahal	8	Reynard 99i	Ford XD V8t	MIA; 12	MOT; 23	LBH; 3	NZR; 22	RIO; 13	STL; 23	MIL; 25	POR; 6	CLE; 6	ROA; 15	TOR; 15	MIS; 20	DET; 9	MDO; 21	CHI; 8	VAN; 24	**LS**; 1*	HOU; 5	SRF; 4	FON; 14		12th	84	
2000	Walker Racing	5	Reynard 2Ki	Honda HR-0 V8t	MIA	LBH; 5	RIO; 20	MOT	NZR	MIL	DET															18th	26	
2000	Mo Nunn Racing	55	Reynard 2Ki	Mercedes-Benz IC108F V8t								POR; 16	CLE; 9	TOR; 18	MIS	CHI	MDO	ROA	VAN							18th	26	
2000	Forsythe Championship Racing	77	Reynard 2Ki	Ford XF V8t																LS; 4	STL	HOU	SRF	FON		18th	26	
2001	Zakspeed Forsythe Championship Racing	77	Reynard 01i	Ford XF V8t	MTY; 16	LBH; 10	TXS; NH	NZR; 21	MOT; 21	MIL; 22	DET; 15	POR; 14	CLE; 3	TOR; 18												22nd	28	
2001	Forsythe Championship Racing	77	Reynard 01i	Ford XF V8t											MIS; 5	CHI; 21	MDO; 25	ROA; 24	VAN; 17	LAU; 27	ROC; 15	HOU; 13	LS; 12	SRF; 18	FON; 25	22nd	28	
2003	PK Racing	27	Lola B02/00	Ford XFE V8t	STP	MTY	LBH	BRH	LAU	MIL	LS; 11	POR	CLE	TOR	VAN	ROA	MDO	MTL	DEN	MIA	MXC	SRF				25th	2	

==== CART career summary ====
Year	Team	Wins	Points	Championship Finish
1994	A. J. Foyt Enterprises	0	11	23rd
1995	Chip Ganassi Racing	0	30	20th
1996	Team Rahal	0	86	8th
1997	Team Rahal	0	72	11th
1998	Team Rahal	1	97	8th
1999	Team Rahal	1	84	12th
2000	Forsythe/Walker/Mo Nunn	0	26	18th
2001	Forsythe Championship Racing	0	28	22nd
2003	PK Racing	0	2	25th

2 wins, Best championship result: 8th

==== IndyCar Series results ====
Year	Team	No.	Chassis	Engine	1	2	3	4	5	6	7	8	9	10	11	12	13	14	15	16	17	Rank	Points	Ref
2003	Andretti Green Racing	27	Dallara IR-03	Honda HI3R V8	HMS	PHX	MOT	INDY	TXS; 5	PPIR	RIR; 14	KAN; 1	NSH; 12	MIS; 19	STL; 21	KTY; 3	NZR; 3	CHI; 3	FON; 22	TX2; 5		13th	277	
2004	Andretti Green Racing	7	Dallara IR-04	Honda HI4R V8	HMS; 13	PHX; 7	MOT; 14	INDY; 4	TXS; 19	RIR; 4	KAN; 5	NSH; 18	MIL; 9	MIS; 6	KTY; 9	PPIR; 9	NZR; 8	CHI; 2	FON; 17	TX2; 16		9th	362	
2005	Andretti Green Racing	7	Dallara IR-05	Honda HI5R V8	HMS; 14	**PHX**; 7	**STP**; 4	MOT; 5	INDY; 3	TXS; 10	RIR; 8	KAN; 15	NSH; 22	MIL; 6	**MIS**; 1	KTY; 19	PPIR; 12	SNM; 13	CHI; 14	WGL; 8	FON; 11	8th	397	
2006	Andretti Green Racing	7	Dallara IR-05	Honda HI6R V8	HMS; 13	STP; 4	MOT; 6	INDY; 20	WGL; 13	TXS; 11	RIR; 6	KAN; 13	NSH; 11	MIL; 7	MIS; 11	KTY; 10	SNM; 10	CHI; 15				11th	289	

==== IndyCar Series career summary ====
Year	Team	Wins	Points	Championship Finish
2003	Andretti Green Racing	1	277	13th
2004	Andretti Green Racing	0	362	9th
2005	Andretti Green Racing	1	397	8th
2006	Andretti Green Racing	0	289	11th

2 wins, best championship result: 8th

==== Indianapolis 500 ====
Year	Chassis	Engine	Start	Finish	Team
1994	Lola T94/00	Ford XB V8t	22	9	A. J. Foyt Enterprises
1995	Reynard 95i	Ford XB V8t	33	13	Chip Ganassi Racing
2004	Dallara IR-04	Honda HI4R V8	23	4	Andretti Green Racing
2005	Dallara IR-05	Honda HI5R V8	18	3	Andretti Green Racing
2006	Dallara IR-05	Honda HI6R V8	16	20	Andretti Green Racing

=== Complete American Le Mans Series results ===
Year	Entrant	Class	Chassis	Engine	Tyres	1	2	3	4	5	6	7	8	9	10	11	12	Rank	Points
2002	Panoz Motor Sports	LMP900	Panoz LMP01 Evo	Élan 6L8 6.0L V8	M	SEB ovr:8 cls:7	SON ovr:3 cls:3	MID ovr:4 cls:4	AME ovr:Ret cls:Ret	WAS ovr:6 cls:6	TRO ovr:4 cls:4	MOS ovr:5 cls:5	MON ovr:6 cls:6	MIA ovr:11 cls:8	PET ovr:5 cls:5			10th	153
2003	Team Nasamax	LMP900	Reynard 01Q	Cosworth XDE 2.6L Turbo V8 (Bio-ethanol)	G	SEB ovr:Ret cls:Ret	ATL	SON	TRO	MOS	AME	MON	MIA	PET				NC	0
2007	Andretti Green Racing	LMP2	Acura ARX-01a	Acura 3.4L V8	M	SEB ovr:2 cls:1	STP ovr:21 cls:7	LNB ovr:6 cls:6	TEX ovr:2 cls:2	UTA ovr:Ret cls:Ret	LIM ovr:7 cls:6	MID ovr:10 cls:7	AME ovr:9 cls:7	MOS ovr:5 cls:3	DET ovr:19 cls:8	PET ovr:Ret cls:Ret	MON ovr:6 cls:4	13th	98
2008	Andretti Green Racing	LMP2	Acura ARX-01b	Acura 3.4L V8	M	SEB ovr:18 cls:6	STP ovr:6 cls:5	LNB ovr:6 cls:4	UTA ovr:8 cls:7	LIM	MID	AME	MOS	DET	PET	MON		24th	38

=== 24 Hours of Le Mans results ===
Year	Team	Co-Drivers	Car	Class	Laps	Pos.	Class Pos.
2002	(United States) Panoz Motor Sports	(Australia) David Brabham (Denmark) Jan Magnussen	Panoz LMP01 Evo	LMP900	90	DNF	DNF

=== Complete A1 Grand Prix results ===
(key) (Races in bold indicate pole position) (Races in italics indicate fastest lap)

Year	Entrant	1	2	3	4	5	6	7	8	9	10	11	12	13	14	15	16	17	18	19	20	21	22	DC	Points
2005–06	USA	GBR; SPR	GBR; FEA	GER; SPR	GER; FEA	POR; SPR	POR; FEA	AUS; SPR; 15	AUS; FEA; 10	MYS; SPR; 10	MYS; FEA; 7	UAE; SPR	UAE; FEA	RSA; SPR	RSA; FEA	IDN; SPR	IDN; FEA	MEX; SPR; 6	MEX; FEA; 13	USA; SPR; 9	USA; FEA; Ret	CHN; SPR	CHN; FEA	16th	23

Sporting positions
Preceded by Rob Wilson	Barber Saab Pro Series Champion; 1991	Succeeded by Robert Amren
Preceded by Robbie Buhl	Indy Lights Champion; 1993	Succeeded by Steve Robertson
