= 1998 ITT Automotive Detroit Grand Prix =

(United States) 1998 Detroit Grand Prix
Race details
- Race 8 of 19 in the 1998 CART season
- The Raceway on Belle Isle
- Date: June 7, 1998
- Official name: 1998 ITT Automotive Detroit Grand Prix
- Location: Detroit Belle Isle street circuit
- Course: Temporary street circuit 2.346 mi / 3.776 km
- Distance: 72 laps 168.912 mi / 271.872 km
- Weather: Dry with temperatures reaching up to 64.4 °F (18.0 °C); wind speeds up to 11.6 miles per hour (18.7 km/h)

Pole position
- Driver: (Canada) Greg Moore (Forsythe Racing)
- Time: 1:13.530

Fastest lap
- Driver: (Italy) Alex Zanardi (Chip Ganassi Racing)
- Time: 1:16.280 (on lap 64 of 72)

Podium
- First: (Italy) Alex Zanardi (Chip Ganassi Racing)
- Second: (Mexico) Adrián Fernández (Patrick Racing)
- Third: (Brazil) Gil de Ferran (Walker Racing)

The 1998 ITT Automotive Detroit Grand Prix was a Championship Auto Racing Teams (CART) race that was held on June 7, 1998, on the Raceway on Belle Isle in Detroit, Michigan. It was the eighth race of the 1998 CART FedEx Champ Car World Series season. The race was won by Alex Zanardi for Chip Ganassi Racing. Adrián Fernández finished second, and Gil de Ferran clinched third.

== Classification ==
=== Race ===
| Pos | No | Driver | Team | Laps | Time/Retired | Grid | Points |
|---|---|---|---|---|---|---|---|
| 1 | 1 | (Italy) Alex Zanardi | Chip Ganassi Racing | 72 | 1:41:17.673 | 2 | 20+1 |
| 2 | 40 | (Mexico) Adrián Fernández | Patrick Racing | 72 | +6.624 | 3 | 16 |
| 3 | 5 | (Brazil) Gil de Ferran | Walker Racing | 72 | +7.511 | 9 | 14 |
| 4 | 27 | (United Kingdom) Dario Franchitti | Team Green | 72 | +8.347 | 8 | 12 |
| 5 | 99 | (Canada) Greg Moore | Forsythe Racing | 72 | +9.784 | 1 | 10+1 |
| 6 | 12 | (United States) Jimmy Vasser | Chip Ganassi Racing | 72 | +10.408 | 7 | 8 |
| 7 | 26 | (Canada) Paul Tracy | Team Green | 72 | +12.141 | 15 | 6 |
| 8 | 21 | (Brazil) Tony Kanaan | Tasman Motorsports Group | 72 | +17.185 | 6 | 5 |
| 9 | 20 | (United States) Scott Pruett | Patrick Racing | 72 | +21.291 | 17 | 4 |
| 10 | 6 | (United States) Michael Andretti | Newman-Haas Racing | 72 | +22.398 | 11 | 3 |
| 11 | 7 | (United States) Bobby Rahal | Team Rahal | 72 | +22.903 | 12 | 2 |
| 12 | 16 | (Brazil) Hélio Castro-Neves | Bettenhausen Racing | 72 | +24.402 | 14 | 1 |
| 13 | 19 | (Mexico) Michel Jourdain Jr. | Payton/Coyne Racing | 72 | +35.526 | 18 | |
| 14 | 24 | (United States) Robby Gordon | Arciero-Wells Racing | 72 | +36.054 | 20 | |
| 15 | 33 | (Canada) Patrick Carpentier | Forsythe Racing | 72 | +36.883 | 16 | |
| 16 | 3 | (Brazil) André Ribeiro | Team Penske | 71 | +1 Lap | 25 | |
| 17 | 11 | (Brazil) Christian Fittipaldi | Newman-Haas Racing | 71 | +1 Lap | 10 | |
| 18 | 25 | (Italy) Max Papis | Arciero-Wells Racing | 71 | +1 Lap | 19 | |
| 19 | 17 | (Brazil) Maurício Gugelmin | PacWest Racing Group | 71 | +1 Lap | 22 | |
| 20 | 36 | (United States) Alex Barron | All American Racing | 70 | +2 Laps | 26 | |
| 21 | 8 | (United States) Bryan Herta | Team Rahal | 69 | Engine | 5 | |
| 22 | 18 | (United Kingdom) Mark Blundell | PacWest Racing Group | 56 | Contact | 21 | |
| 23 | 10 | (United States) Richie Hearn | Della Penna Motorsports | 50 | Turbo | 4 | |
| 24 | 2 | (United States) Al Unser Jr. | Team Penske | 46 | Transmission | 13 | |
| 25 | 98 | (United States) P. J. Jones | All American Racing | 40 | Transmission | 24 | |
| 26 | 9 | (Finland) JJ Lehto | Hogan Racing | 17 | Handling | 23 | |
| 27 | 77 | (West Germany) Arnd Meier | Davis Racing | 9 | Engine | 27 | |
| 28 | 34 | (United States) Dennis Vitolo | Payton/Coyne Racing | 6 | Electrical | 28 | |

== Caution flags ==
| Laps | Cause |
|---|---|
| 43-45 | Fittipaldi (11) spin |
| 51-54 | Hearn (10) engine blow-up |

== Lap Leaders ==
| Laps | Leader |
|---|---|
| 1-22 | Greg Moore |
| 23-72 | Alex Zanardi |

| Driver | Laps led |
|---|---|
| Alex Zanardi | 50 |
| Greg Moore | 22 |

== Point standings after race ==
| Pos | Driver | Points |
|---|---|---|
| 1 | (Italy) Alex Zanardi | 113 |
| 2 | (Canada) Greg Moore | 97 |
| 3 | (United States) Jimmy Vasser | 80 |
| 4 | (Mexico) Adrián Fernández | 75 |
| 5 | (Brazil) Gil de Ferran | 55 |

| Previous race: 1998 Miller 200 | CART FedEx Championship Series; 1998 season | Next race: 1998 Budweiser/G.I. Joe's 200 |
| Previous race: 1997 ITT Automotive; Detroit Grand Prix | ITT Automotive; Detroit Grand Prix | Next race: 1999 ITT Automotive; Detroit Grand Prix |
