= Michael Andretti =

American racing driver (born 1962)

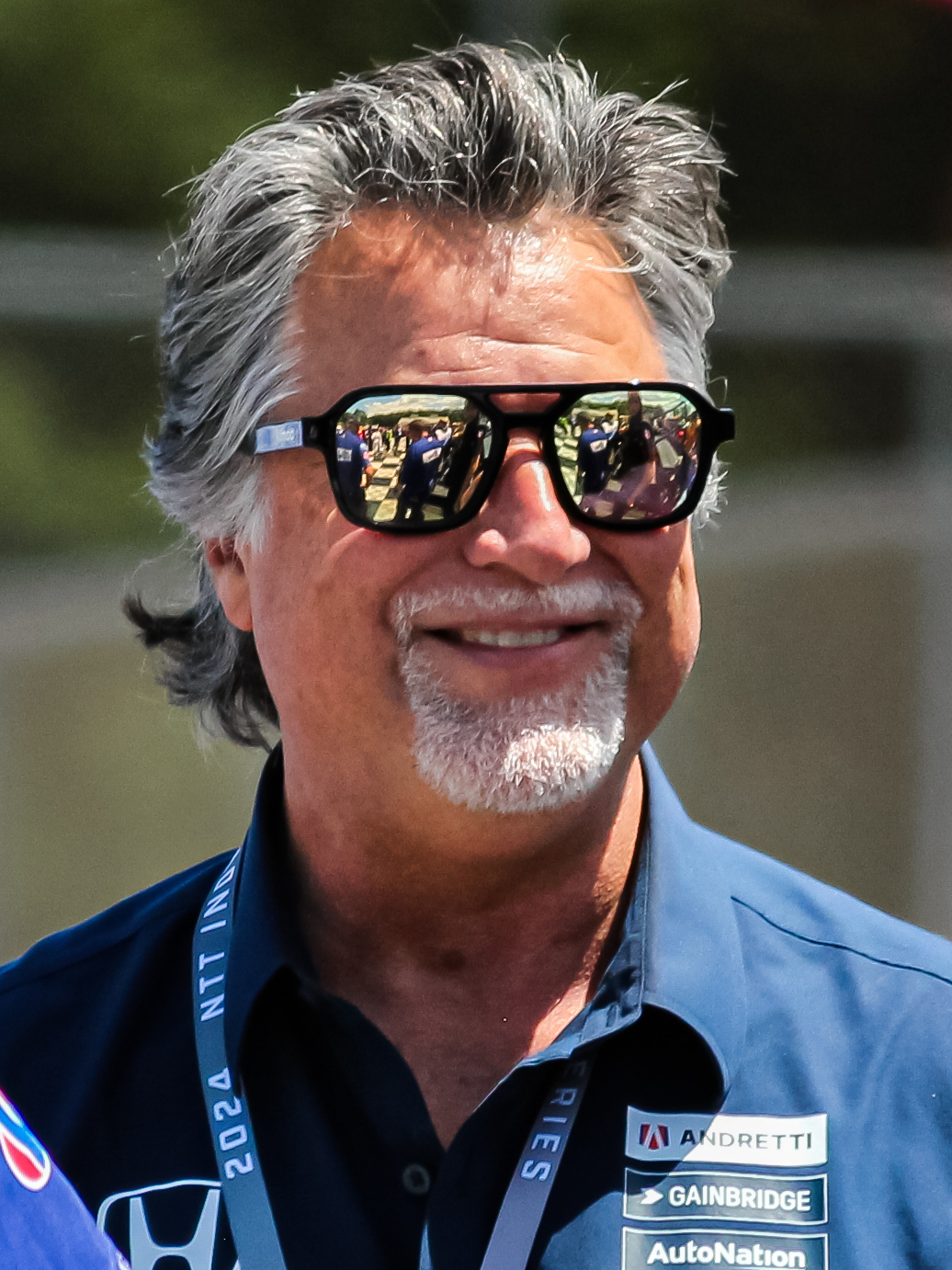
- Andretti at Road America in 2024
- Born: Michael Mario Andretti; October 5, 1962 (age 64) Bethlehem, Pennsylvania, U.S.

Championship titles
- CART Championship Car (1991); Major victories Long Beach Grand Prix (1986, 2002); Michigan 500 (1987, 1989)

Champ Car career
- 309 races run over 19 years
- Best finish: 1st (1991)
- First race: 1983 Caesars Palace Grand Prix (Caesars Palace)
- Last race: 2002 Gran Premio Telmex-Gigante (Mexico City)
- First win: 1986 Long Beach Grand Prix (Long Beach)
- Last win: 2002 Long Beach Grand Prix (Long Beach)
Wins	Podiums	Poles
42	98	32

IndyCar Series career
- 8 races run over 5 years
- Best finish: 24th (2003, 2006)
- First race: 2001 Indianapolis 500 (Indianapolis)
- Last race: 2007 Indianapolis 500 (Indianapolis)
Wins	Podiums	Poles
0	2	0

Formula One World Championship career
- Nationality: (United States) American
- Active years: 1993
- Team: McLaren
- Entries: 13
- Championships: 0
- Wins: 0
- Podiums: 1
- Career points: 7
- Pole positions: 0
- Fastest laps: 0
- First entry: 1993 South African Grand Prix
- Last entry: 1993 Italian Grand Prix

24 Hours of Le Mans career
- Years: 1982–1983, 1988, 1997
- Teams: Grand Touring, Porsche-Kremer, Porsche AG, Courage
- Best finish: 3rd (1983)
- Class wins: 0

Michael Mario Andretti (born October 5, 1962) is an American former racing driver, and current team owner. Statistically one of the most successful drivers in the history of American open-wheel car racing, Andretti won the 1991 CART championship, and amassed 42 race victories, the most in the CART era and fifth-most all time. Since his retirement, Andretti has owned Andretti Autosport, which has won four IndyCar Series championships and five Indianapolis 500 races. He is the son of Mario Andretti, a multi-time champion, and is the father of IndyCar Series driver Marco Andretti.

== Early life and education ==
Andretti was born on October 5, 1962, in Bethlehem, Pennsylvania, in the Lehigh Valley region of eastern Pennsylvania to race car driver Mario Andretti, a four-time IndyCar champion and one-time Formula One champion and his wife, Dee Ann (née Hoch). His brother Jeff Andretti competed in IndyCar. His uncle, Aldo Andretti, was an open wheel racer until an accident ended his racing career. Aldo's son John Andretti raced in IndyCar before he became a NASCAR regular. He returned to IndyCar in 2007, 2008, 2009, 2010 and 2011, where he raced in the Indy 500. Aldo's other son, Adam, is also a racing driver. In 2006 Michael's eldest son, Marco, made his debut in the IndyCar Series. The Andretti family became the first family to have five members (Michael, Mario, Marco, Jeff, and John) compete in the same series (CART/Champ Car/IndyCar).

Andretti graduated from Nazareth Area High School in Nazareth, Pennsylvania, and then attended Northampton Community College in Bethlehem.

== Career ==
Following a successful career racing karts, winning fifty of his 75 races over eight years, Andretti moved into racing cars. He obtained his SCCA National License in 1980, then won six races to claim the SCCA's Northeast Division Formula Ford championship in 1981. He also drove in a number of Formula Vee races in regional SCCA events.

In 1982, Andretti won six of the eleven races on his way to winning the Robert Bosch US Formula Super Vee Championship. He also won the opening race of the 1983 Super Vee season before he moved up to drive in Formula Atlantic, and won his second title by winning the FIA Formula Mondial North American Cup the following season. Although he made his international sports car debut at the 1982 24 Hours of Le Mans, he was denied the opportunity to race, as the Mirage M12 he had chosen to race with his father was disqualified eighty minutes before the race was due to start. The father and son partnership returned to the Circuit de la Sarthe the following year, and were joined by Philippe Alliot in the Porsche Kremer Racing's Porsche 956, taking third place. Andretti also raced alongside his father in the Riverside 6 Hours where they were joined by A. J. Foyt and Preston Henn, but the Porsche 935 failed to finish. The father and son duo paired up again the 1984 24 Hours of Daytona, this time in a full-works Porsche 962, which made its race debut. They took pole position, but during the race, the engine broke.

=== CART ===
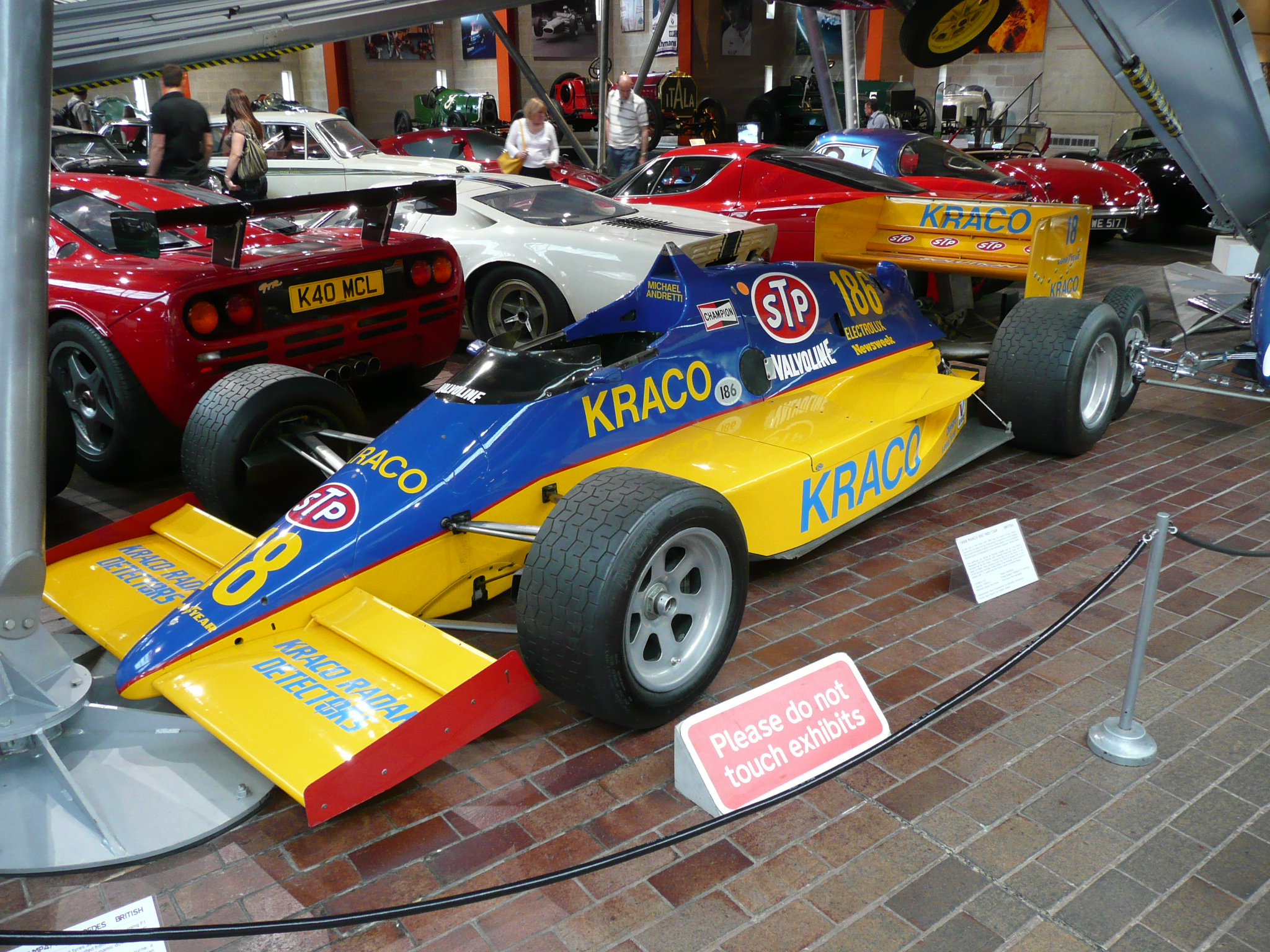
Andretti's first race winning IndyCar, now on display at National Motor Museum in Beaulieu, Hampshire, England

Andretti made his CART debut in 1983, racing for the Kraco Enterprises team. He re-signed for Kraco for the 1984 season, where he managed five third-place finishes and ended his rookie season in seventh overall. In the Indianapolis 500, he finished fifth and shared the Rookie of the Year award with Roberto Guerrero. He went on to win his first IndyCar race in 1986 in the Toyota Grand Prix of Long Beach. The season became a two-man battle for the championship title, between Andretti and Bobby Rahal. Andretti would take the points lead with his victory on the Milwaukee Mile. A week later, on Father's Day, Andretti was leading on the final lap at Portland, when his March-Cosworth 86C ran out of fuel, allowing his father Mario to beat him by just 0.07 seconds. It was one of the most shocking finishes in the history of IndyCar, and the closest finish until 1997. With Rahal continuing to win races, Andretti's consistent finishing only allowed Rahal a nine-point lead in the standing with two races remaining. Andretti won a key victory in at Phoenix. Going into the season finale at Tamiami Park, Andretti was just three points behind Rahal, but neither driver were a factor in the race, with Andretti retiring with a broken halfshaft.

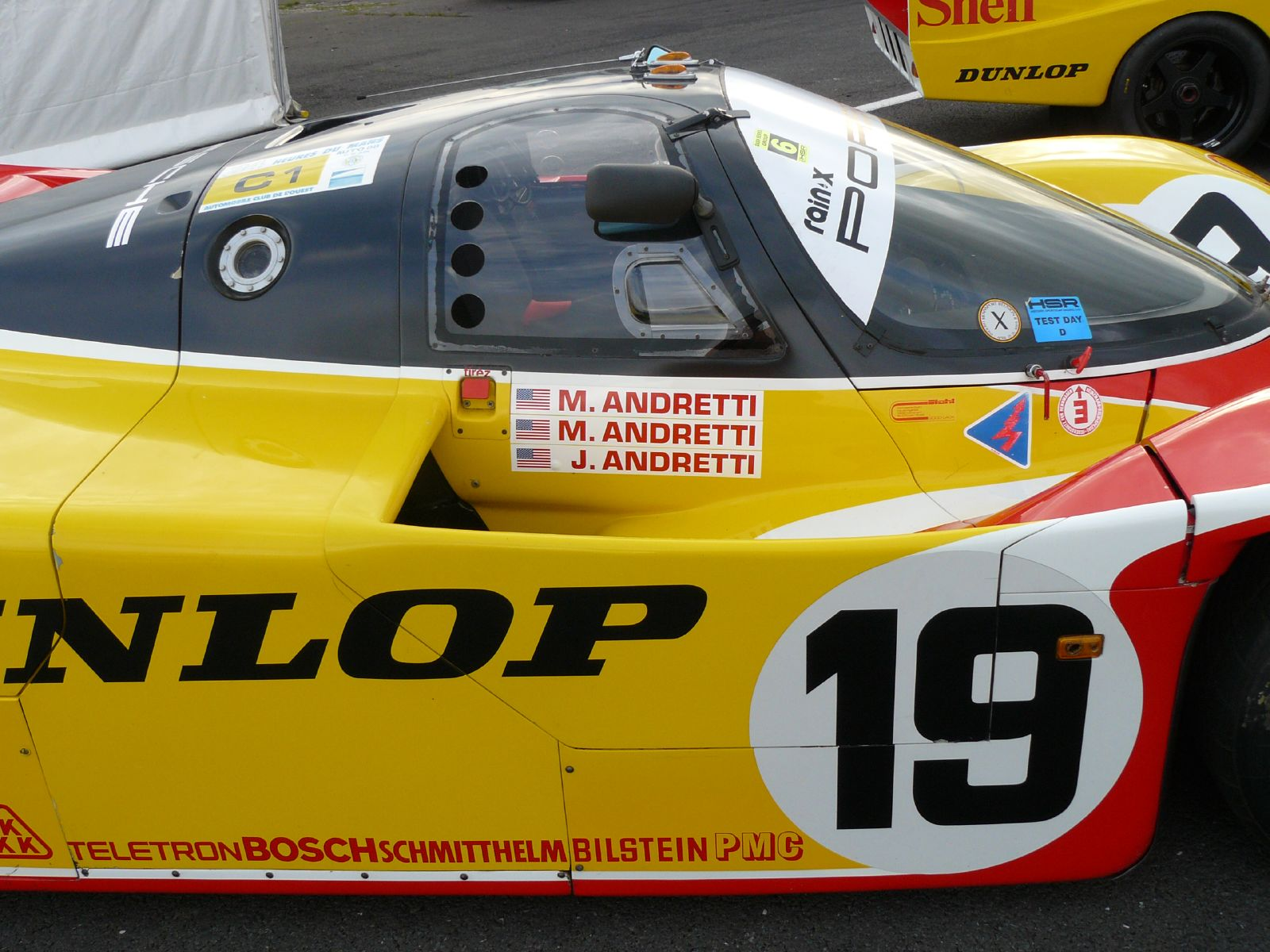
The Andretti family's 962C, 24 Hours of Le Mans in 1988

In a one-off race with Alfa Corse, Andretti took part in the inaugural World Touring Car race, 500 km di Monza. Paired with Alessandro Nannini, they finished sixteenth overall, second in class. Back in CART, he continued with Kraco in 1987, and like 1986, the championship was between Andretti and Rahal. Andretti would win the 1987 Marlboro 500, drawing within nine points of Rahal. With him winning in dominating fashion at Nazareth Speedway, his championship hopes remained alive, although Rahal clinched the championship at the next race. Andretti would also win the season finale, Tamiami Park. He would finish runner-up for the second season in a row. Back in June 1987, Andretti joined Hendrick Motorsport to race a Chevrolet Corvette GTP in the Mid-Ohio 500 km, this time joined by his cousin, John Andretti, where they finished eleventh. Following Porsche's defeat in the 1988 Daytona 24 Hours, Porsche entered a 962C at Le Mans for Michael, Mario, and John. They were competitive in the first half of the race until the Andretti family's car needed minor repairs before lapsing on to five cylinders, finishing sixth overall. Michael and Mario join Busby Racing for 1989 Daytona 24 Hours, only for their 962 to retire with brakes problems.

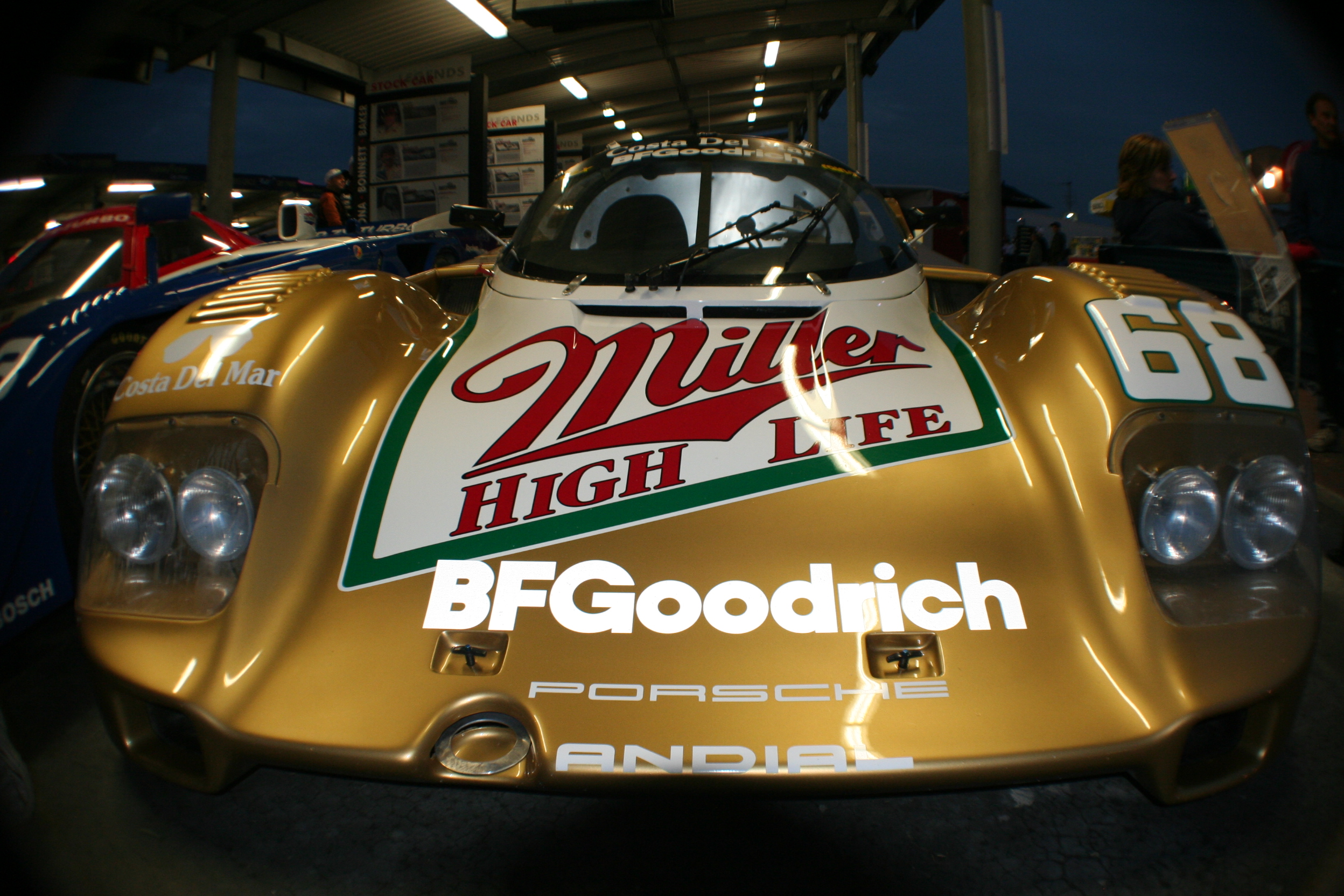
Michael and Mario's 1989 Porsche 962, driven in the 24 Hours of Daytona

The 1988 CART season was a lean year for Andretti. He remained with Kraco and won only a single race, the Marlboro Challenge, for which no championship points were awarded. For the 1989 season, Andretti signed with Newman/Haas Racing, partnering him with his father. He won two races that season, Molson Indy Toronto and the 1989 Marlboro 500 at the Michigan International Speedway, placing third in points. For 1990, Al Unser Jr. would become champion, Andretti was his nearest competitor, winning five races and four poles. In the second-to-last race of the season at Nazareth, Unser crashed out, giving Andretti a huge opportunity to close the gap. Andretti managed only a sixth-place finish, and could not capitalize on Unser's misfortune. Unser left Nazareth with a 27-point lead, enough to clinch the championship. Andretti would finish runner-up once again. For the 1991 24 Hours of Daytona, Andretti was joined by his brother, Jeff Andretti. Piloting a Jochen Dauer Racing entered Porsche 962, they were classified fifth overall, despite not finishing the race.

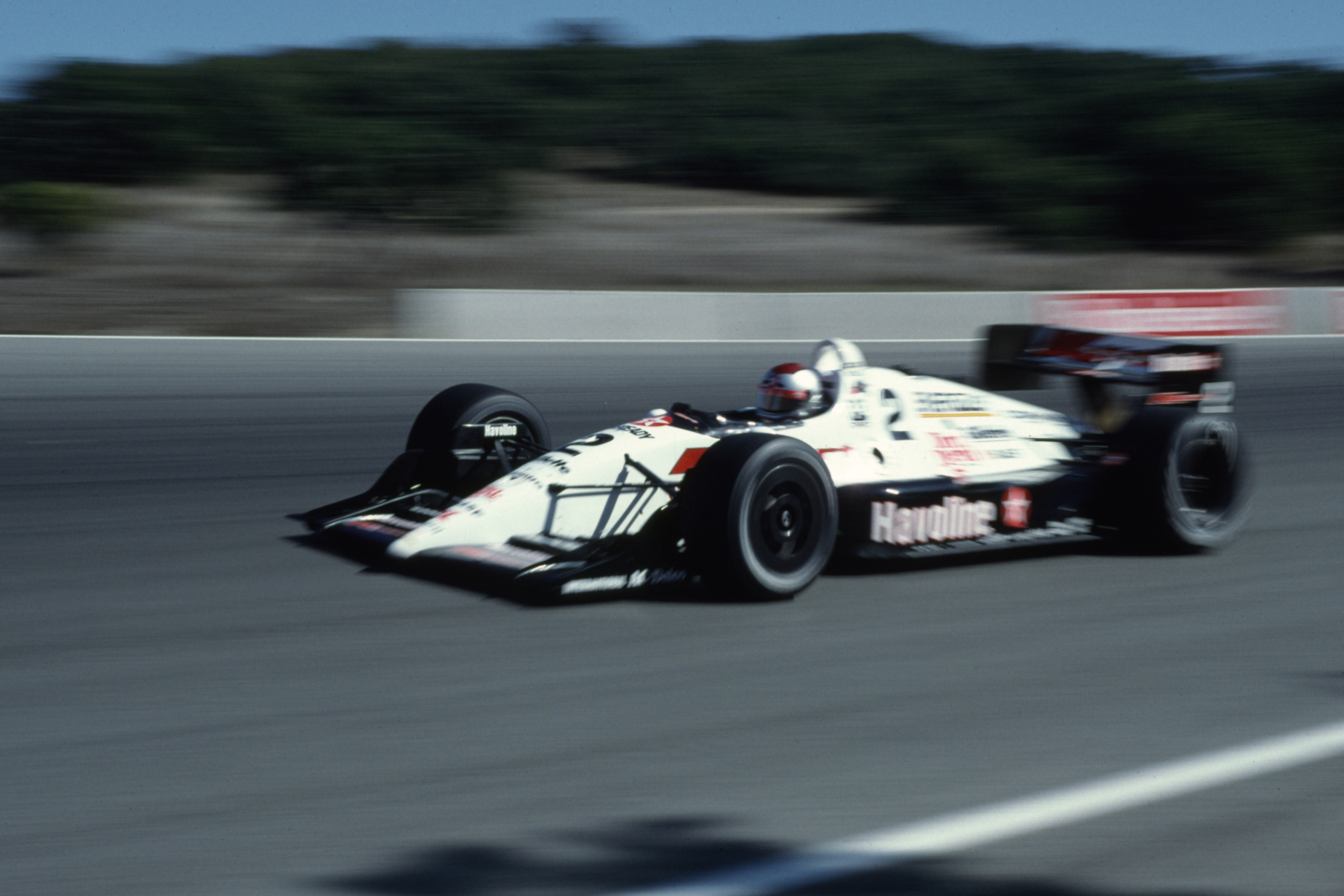
Andretti racing at Monterey, California in October 1991

Andretti was the drivers' champion of the 1991 CART PPG Indy Car World Series. He won a total eight of seventeen races, eight poles and led more than half of the laps during the season, but Rahal still took the championship battle down to the final race of the season. Andretti's season started slowly, recording DNFs in the opening two events, then the heartbreaking second place at the Indy 500. He recovered from this, winning four of the last five races of the season and with Rahal retiring during the title decider at Laguna Seca, he cruised to the title. The day before, he won the non-championship, Marlboro Challenge for a second time.

Remaining with Newman/Haas for 1992, Andretti's season started slowly, but then won three races out of four during the mid-season. Despite taking two more wins later in the year, including the season finale at Laguna Seca, Rahal beat him again to the title by just four points. He would leave for Formula One at the end of the year, with his seat going to the reigning Formula One World Champion Nigel Mansell, who would win the 1993 CART title in his rookie season. For four seasons between 1989 and 1992, Andretti had his father as his teammate at Newman/Haas. Together, they established a number of firsts, including the first father-son front row, for the 1986 Dana 200 for Special Olympics at Phoenix, and the first of 15 father-son podiums in the 1984 Cribari Wines 300K at Laguna Seca, with the last coming nearly a decade later in the 1992 Daikyo IndyCar Grand Prix, around the street of Surfers Paradise.

=== Racing record at Indianapolis ===
Andretti holds the record for most laps led in the Indy 500 without having achieved a victory. The Andretti family's bad luck at the Indianapolis Motor Speedway is known as the Andretti curse. He shared Rookie of the Year honours with Guerrero in 1984, when he finished fifth. In 1991, he led with 12 laps remaining, but finished second to Rick Mears after battling the multiple Indy 500 winner. The pair of them traded late-lap outside passes for the lead in Turn One. In 1992, he dominated the race, leading four-fifths of the laps, but, with 11 laps remaining after holding a two-lap lead, his fuel pump failed, and his car coasted to a stop. He was classified in 13th place. He also dropped out while leading the Indy 500 in 1989, 1995 and 2003.

=== Formula One ===
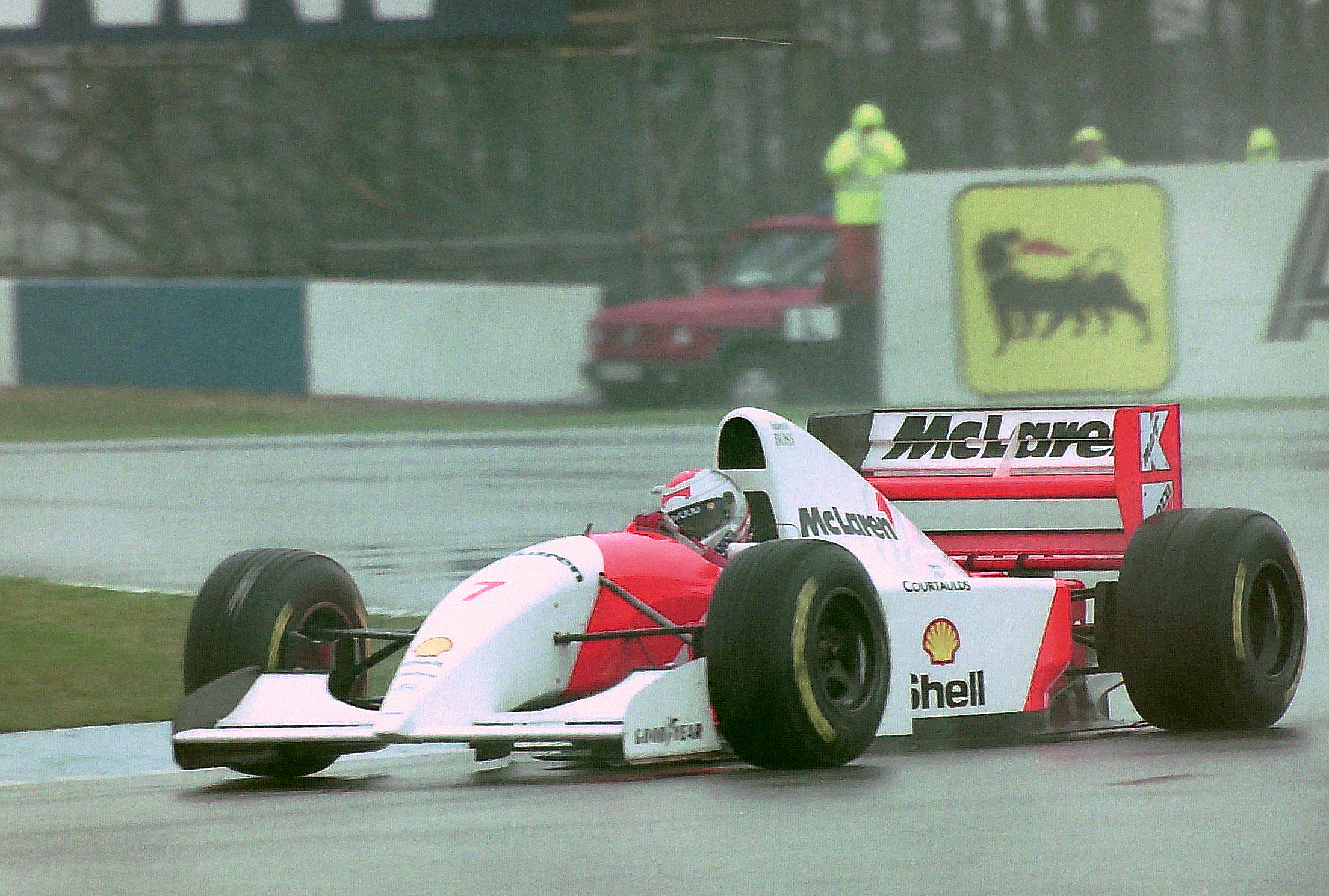
Andretti driving for McLaren at the 1993 European Grand Prix in Donington Park

Andretti's first prospects for a Formula One drive came about in mid-1986. The American owned and sponsored, but English based, Haas Lola team, competing in their first (and only) full season of F1, needed a driver for the 1986 Detroit Grand Prix as one of their regular drivers, Frenchman Patrick Tambay, had a broken foot from the previous race in Canada and could not drive. Team owner Carl Haas had originally wanted his CART driver and 1978 World Drivers' Champion Mario Andretti to drive in Detroit in Tambay's place. However, Mario was not interested in a return to F1, but instead pushed for his son Michael to get the drive, to which Haas agreed. Unfortunately however, at the time the sports governing body FISA somewhat controversially refused to grant the younger Andretti the Super Licence required to drive in Formula One. As a result, the drive went to the only other American in Formula One during the 1980s, Eddie Cheever who was spending 1986 driving Jaguar sportscars in the World Sports Prototype Championship.

For the 1993 season, Andretti signed for Marlboro McLaren to partner with the triple World Drivers' Champion Ayrton Senna in their Ford HBD V8-powered MP4/8. He signed during the summer of 1992 and the deal was announced at Monza over the weekend of the 1992 Italian Grand Prix. Ron Dennis, McLaren's team principal, said: "I think he can win Grands Prix and become the World Champion. It's not a question of which country you come from. It's how you demonstrate your desire to win." There were practical factors that mitigated against Andretti being able to show competitive form in his debut season in Formula One. The rule changes introduced that season destroyed his hopes of unrestricted laps in free practice during which he could learn the tracks, as most were unfamiliar to him. From the start of 1993, just 23 laps were allowed in the morning's untimed session and only twelve in the qualifying session.

With the pressure intensifying, Andretti began the year with crashes in at Kyalami and at Interlagos. In the latter of these two, he had a massive collision at the start with Gerhard Berger in a Ferrari. He then qualified sixth for the Sega European Grand Prix at Donington Park but collided with Karl Wendlinger's Sauber on the opening lap. Next time out at Imola, he again fell foul of Wendlinger after a drive that might have ended with a visit to the podium, and many critics cited this as the key turning point for the American. In the 1993 Spanish Grand Prix, Andretti finally completed a race, finishing fifth amongst the established front runners. His showing was criticized by former McLaren World Champion James Hunt because Andretti was lapped by his teammate Senna, though Andretti countered by saying that he had been under a lot of pressure to not just finish a Grand Prix, but to also finish in the points so he basically drove within himself in order to finish.

Andretti finished in the points on three occasions but not consistently. He never fully got to grips with the McLaren MP4/8. Highly technical aspects which he was not used to in the technologically simpler Indy cars such as active suspension and traction control hampered Andretti's chances as did the standing starts used in F1. Some in the industry, including former F1 driver and multiple Le Mans winner Derek Bell who mentioned it while doing guest commentary at the Italian Grand Prix for American television broadcaster ESPN, also felt that since he commuted to races and test sessions from the United States, rather than relocating full-time to Europe, this was also a contributing factor to his lack of success in Formula One. At the time, McLaren's Special Projects Manager and long-time Andretti family friend Tyler Alexander, who had been involved in Formula One since the mid-1960s, had urged him to relocate to England as he knew times had changed from when his father had raced to the 1978 World Championship. He finished third at Monza, which would prove to be his last Formula One race; with three races remaining, he left the team and the championship by mutual agreement after the race.

According to Andretti's son Marco, the McLaren team "sabotaged" his father's chances at being competitive in order to replace him with the team's test driver Mika Häkkinen, who would require a smaller salary. In 2008, Marco said: "The reality of it was, they had Mika Häkkinen ready to come in for a lot less than what my dad was getting paid, and that's all it was. Right then and there, they had to make him look [bad]. They would make the car do weird things in the corner electronically, stuff out of his control." Andretti still had problems in practice for the Italian Grand Prix, and both he and Senna spun off with brake balance problems early in the race. Andretti was able to continue and fought back up to third, holding off Wendlinger. Throughout the season, Senna experienced similar reliability problems to Andretti, mainly electronic gremlins, particularly in San Marino, Canada, Hungary, and Belgium, although Häkkinen equalled Andretti's third place Monza finish in Japan, while Senna won both the Japanese Grand Prix and the season ending Australian Grand Prix, his final race for McLaren.

According to Häkkinen in a much later interview, Andretti's commuting to Europe from the United States meant he was not in Europe enough when testing needed to be done, allowing Häkkinen to consistently show his speed and build a relationship with the team. Häkkinen had also said that Andretti's mental approach was wrong, and he did not realize the kind of sacrifices one needed to make in order to succeed in Formula One. It has also been reported that at the start of the 1993 season, Dennis signed Häkkinen as a backup to Senna, who was initially reluctant to commit to the team for the whole season; Senna's move to Williams had to wait until the next season because his rival Alain Prost was having his retirement season there and had it written into his contract that they could not sign Senna as his teammate. This created a difficult atmosphere for Andretti, who would be in the shadow of Senna, and also faced the threat of being replaced by Häkkinen.

Some commentators have suggested that if Andretti had remained with McLaren for the 1994 season, when most electronic driver aids were banned except semi-automatic transmissions, the cars would have been closer in specification to those used in CART. They argue that, combined with his growing familiarity with most Formula One circuits, he might have been able to demonstrate the form that initially brought him into Formula One. Mario Andretti has also expressed regret that his son pursued opportunities in the United States rather than continuing his Formula One career for a longer period.

=== Return to CART ===
Andretti returned to the IndyCar racing after his unsuccessful season in Formula One with Target Chip Ganassi Racing, where he once again proved successful. He went on to win in his very first race back in the series at the 1994 Australian FAI Indycar Grand Prix, around the Surfers Paradise Street Circuit in Queensland, Australia, having led every lap along the way. That win also got Reynard's first win in CART in their debut. He also won again in the Molson Indy Toronto, taking a record fourth win. By the time he retired, he had won seven times at Exhibition Place.

In 1995, Andretti returned to Newman/Haas Racing after the team had parted ways with former F1 world champion Nigel Mansell. Taking only one win in Toronto, he had a consistent season, scoring points in every round which resulted in Andretti claiming fourth overall in the points standing. The following season, he would finish as runner-up to Jimmy Vasser, in a season marred by the death of Jeff Krosnoff and split with Indy Racing League, visiting victory lane on five occasions. Newman/Haas began a new relationship with Swift which did not prove to be very successful in 1997–1999. In 2000 the team used Lola chassis and Andretti won the Firestone Firehawk 300 held at Twin Ring Motegi in Japan, and again in Toronto.

Andretti tried again to win Le Mans in 1997, again alongside his father, but joined on this occasion by Olivier Grouillard. Following an accident during the night, the trio were forced to retire their Courage C36. He would not return to la Sarthe as a driver. For 2001, Andretti made the decision to move to Team Green as he wanted to try to win the Indianapolis 500 and Newman/Haas refused to enter the Indy Racing League event. Andretti ran in a third Team Green car with Motorola sponsorship and ran at Indianapolis. He led 16 laps, and was leading the race during a rain delay just beyond the halfway point. Had the race been halted due to the rain, he could have been declared the winner. The red flag, however, did not come out at the time and the race resumed. A punctured tyre, and a minor collision in the pits with eventual winner Hélio Castroneves, driving for car owner Roger Penske, slowed him down, and at the end of the day, Andretti settled for third place. In July, it was announced that he had bought the team and intended to shift the entire operation (which was renamed Andretti Green Racing) to the IRL.

Andretti's career in CART ended in 2002, in which he took his 42nd and final career victory at the Toyota Grand Prix of Long Beach. placing him in third place for all-time victories in championship car racing behind his father (52 wins) and A. J. Foyt (67 wins). Andretti is also tied with Al Unser Jr. for the most wins in a CART/IndyCar season with eight victories. He achieved this during his championship-winning season of 1991. Throughout his time in IndyCar, he retained a consistent and impressive record, finishing in the top ten of the championship on seventeen occasions.

== Semi-retirement and team owner ==
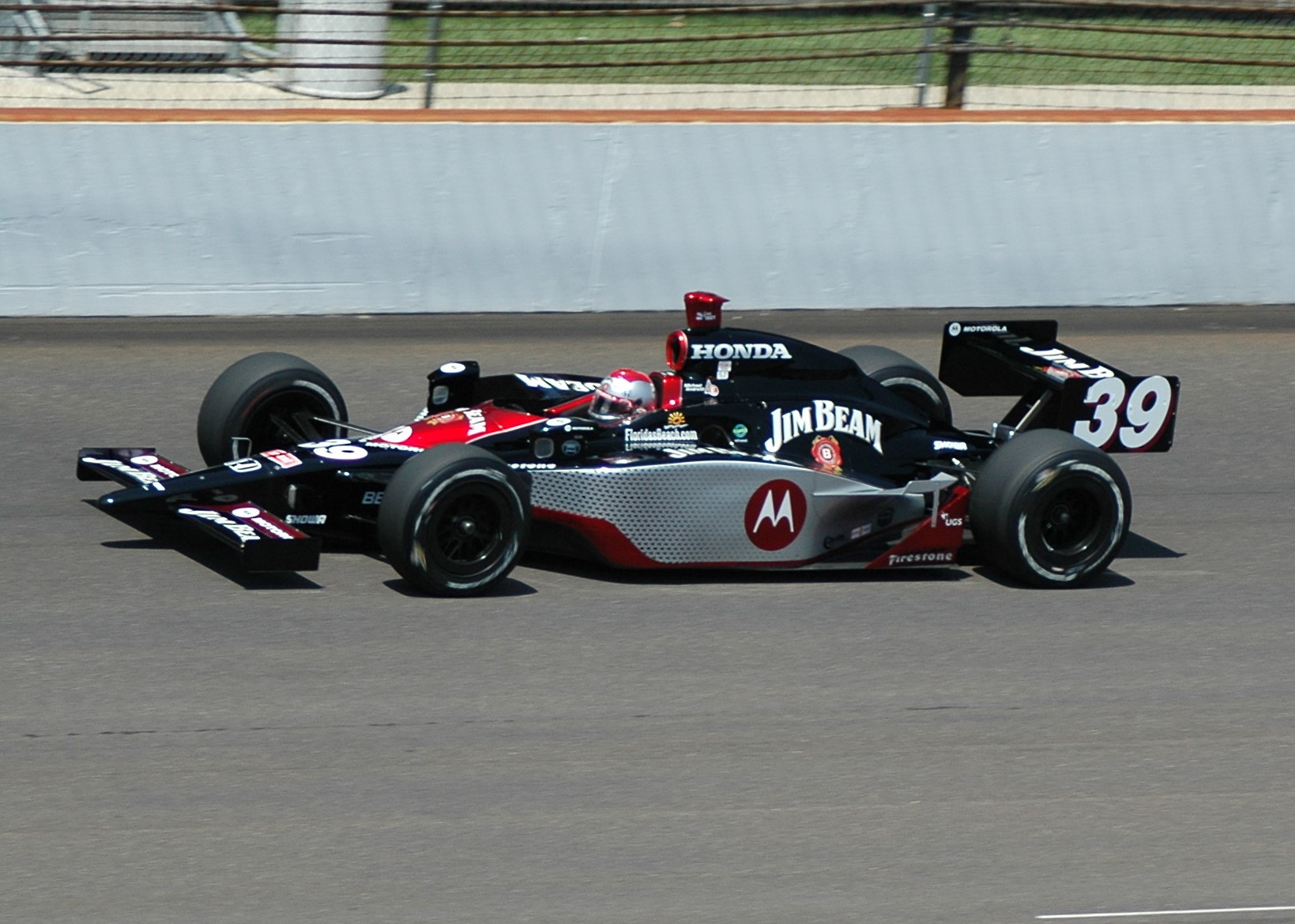
Andretti practicing for the 2007 Indianapolis 500

Andretti entered in the first four IRL events in 2003, culminating with the 2003 Indianapolis 500, after which he retired from full-time IndyCar racing. He led the race for 28 of the opening 94 laps before a throttle linkage failure put him out of contention once again. That year he bought into the "Team Green" squad run by brothers Kim and Barry Green in CART. It became Andretti Green Racing and for 2003, the team moved to the Indy Racing League IndyCar Series. The team claimed consecutive IndyCar Series titles in 2004 and 2005, with Tony Kanaan and Dan Wheldon respectively, winning eleven of the seventeen races, including the Indianapolis 500. The 2007 season enhanced the Andretti legacy, when Dario Franchitti captured a third Series title for Andretti Green Racing in four seasons, and its second Indianapolis 500 win.

Andretti returned to the driver's seat for the 2006 Indianapolis 500 in a one-time effort to assist the development of his son, Marco, an IndyCar rookie for the 2006 season. Andretti led the race with four laps to go, before falling to second behind his son a lap later. He went on to finish third, while Marco only just missed out on the 500 victory after he was passed just before the start/finish line on the last lap by three-time IndyCar champion, Sam Hornish Jr. After qualifying his car in eleventh place for the 2007 Indianapolis 500, Andretti went on to finish thirteenth. He then announced that this would be his last Indy 500 as a driver. Andretti leaves driving competition at Indy with a frustrating distinction: the driver who led the most laps (431) without winning the race. He competed in 16 Indy 500s, with a top finish of second in 1991, but led the race nine times.

By 2012, Andretti's team was racing under the name of Andretti Autosport. He served as the team owners and strategist on Ryan Hunter-Reay's four race victories. Hunter-Reay captured the 2014 Indianapolis 500, with a close victory over Hélio Castroneves. At the beginning of 2018, Andretti partnered with Ryan Walkinshaw's Walkinshaw Racing and Zak Brown's United Autosports to create Walkinshaw Andretti United which competes in the Australian Supercars Championship. Andretti United expanded into Extreme E in 2021. On February 18, 2022, it was announced that Andretti had submitted a request with the FIA to enter Formula 1 under "Andretti Global". Formula One announced on January 31, 2024, that it had rejected Andretti's latest bid to join the sport by 2026, but that it was leaving the door open for an admission from 2028.

In October 2024, Andretti stepped down as CEO of Andretti Global, with the company announcing that he will remain involved in a strategic advisory capacity while the search for a new CEO begins.

== Other activities ==
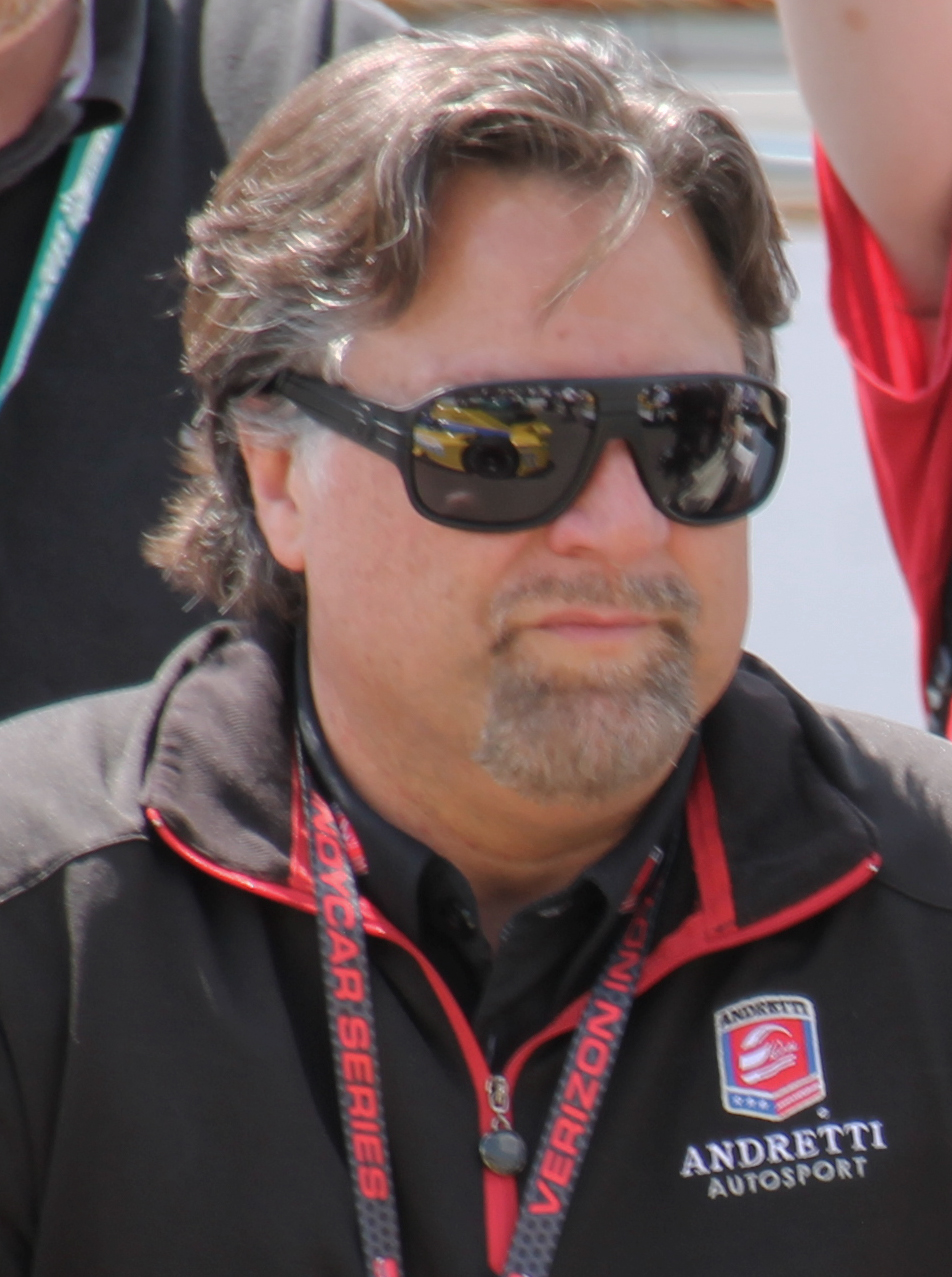
Andretti at the Indianapolis Motor Speedway in May 2015

In 1996, Andretti invested in a Toyota dealership in his home state of Pennsylvania. Among his personal appearances, Andretti appeared as a contestant on season 5 of the reality TV series The Celebrity Apprentice, which debuted in February 2012. Andretti joined the show as a last-minute replacement for his son Marco, who dropped out when Marco's friend Dan Wheldon was killed in the 2011 IZOD IndyCar World Championship hours before Apprentice filming was scheduled to begin. Andretti was fired in the fourth episode, after a presentation for Buick executives of the Buick Verano. In March 2012, Andretti Sports Marketing took over as promoter of the Milwaukee Mile IndyCar race. The company also promoted the Indy Grand Prix of Louisiana, the Miami ePrix and the Global RallyCross Championship events at Washington and New York.

== Personal life ==
Andretti was married to Sandra "Sandy" Spinozzi from November 1985 to 1996 and they had two children, son Marco (born March 13, 1987) and daughter Marissa (born October 31, 1990). He remarried on December 24, 1997, to Leslie Wood. They had a son, Lucca, born September 16, 1999. Andretti officially separated from Wood in 2003, and filed for divorce on September 7, 2004. Two years later, on July 15, 2006, Andretti announced his engagement to former Miss Oregon Teen USA 1994, Playboy Playmate of the Year 1999, model and actress Jodi Ann Paterson. The couple were married on October 7, 2006, at the Andretti Winery in Napa Valley, California. They have twin children, Mario and Miati (Mia), born February 13, 2014. The couple currently resides in Fishers, Indiana.

== Awards ==
Andretti was inducted into National Italian American Sports Hall of Fame in 2002, the Motorsports Hall of Fame of America in 2008, the Long Beach Grand Prix Walk of Fame in 2010, the Canadian Motorsports (International Division) Hall of Fame in 2012, and the Indianapolis Motor Speedway Hall of Fame in 2012.

== Racing record ==
=== Career summary ===
Season	Series	Pos	Team	Car
1981	SCCA National Championship Runoffs Formula F	8th		Van Diemen RF81
1982	Robert Bosch/VW Super Vee Championship	1st	Arciero Racing	Ralt-Volkswagen RT5/81; Ralt-Volkswagen RT5/82
	SCCA National Championship Runoffs Formula F	3rd		Lola T640
1983	Formula Mondial North American Cup	1st	Conte Racing	Ralt-Ford RT4
	24 Heures du Mans	3rd	Kremer Racing	Porsche 956
	Robert Bosch/VW Super Vee Championship	18th		Ralt-Volkswagen RT5/82
	FIA World Endurance Championship	25th	Kremer Racing	Porsche 956
	PPG Indy Car World Series	27th	Kraco Racing	March-Cosworth 83C
	European Endurance Championship	28th	Kremer Racing	Porsche 956
1983/4	USAC Gold Crown Series	5th	Kraco Racing	March-Cosworth 84C
1984	PPG Indy Car World Series	7th	Kraco Racing	March-Cosworth 83C
1985	USAC Gold Crown Series	8th	Kraco Racing	March-Cosworth 84C
	PPG Indy Car World Series	9th	Kraco Racing	March-Cosworth 85C
1986	PPG Indy Car World Series	2nd	Kraco Racing	March-Cosworth 86C
	USAC Gold Crown Series	6th	Kraco Racing	March-Cosworth 86C
1987	PPG Indy Car World Series	2nd	Kraco Racing	March-Cosworth 87C
	International Race of Champions	7th		Chevrolet Camaro
	USAC Gold Crown Series	29th	Kraco Racing	March-Cosworth 87C
	World Touring Car Championship	38th	Alfa Corse	Alfa Romeo 75 Turbo
	Camel GTP Championship	40th	Conte Racing; Hendrick Motorsport	March-Buick 86G; Chevrolet Corvette GTP
1988	Marlboro Challenge	1st	Kraco Racing	Lola-Cosworth T88/00
	USAC Gold Crown Series	4th	Kraco Racing	March-Cosworth 88C
	PPG Indy Car World Series	6th	Kraco Racing	March-Cosworth 88C; Lola-Cosworth T88/00
	World Sports Prototype Championship for Drivers	44th	Porsche AG	Porsche 962C
1989	PPG Indy Car World Series	3rd	Newman/Haas Racing	Lola-Chevrolet T89/00
	USAC Gold Crown Series	17th	Newman/Haas Racing	Lola-Chevrolet T89/00
1990	PPG Indy Car World Series	2nd	Newman/Haas Racing	Lola-Chevrolet T90/00
	USAC Gold Crown Series	20th	Newman/Haas Racing	Lola-Chevrolet T90/00
1991	PPG Indy Car World Series	1st	Newman/Haas Racing	Lola-Chevrolet T91/00
	Marlboro Challenge	1st	Newman/Haas Racing	Lola-Chevrolet T91/00
	USAC Gold Crown Series	2nd	Newman/Haas Racing	Lola-Chevrolet T91/00
	Camel GTP Championship	29th	Jochen Dauer Racing	Porsche 962C
1992	PPG Indy Car World Series	2nd	Newman/Haas Racing	Lola-Ford T91/00; Lola-Ford T92/00
	Marlboro Challenge	2nd	Newman/Haas Racing	Lola-Ford T92/00
	USAC Gold Crown Series	13th	Newman/Haas Racing	Lola-Ford T92/00
1993	FIA Formula One World Championship	11th	Marlboro McLaren	McLaren-Ford MP4/8
1994	PPG Indy Car World Series	4th	Target Chip Ganassi Racing	Reynard-Ford 94I
	USAC Gold Crown Series	6th	Target Chip Ganassi Racing	Reynard-Ford 94I
1995	PPG Indy Car World Series	4th	Newman/Haas Racing	Lola-Ford T95/00
	USAC Gold Crown Series	25th	Newman/Haas Racing	Lola-Ford T95/00
1996	PPG Indy Car World Series	2nd	Newman/Haas Racing	Lola-Ford T96/00
1997	PPG CART World Series	8th	Newman/Haas Racing	Swift-Ford 007i
1998	FedEx Championship Series	7th	Newman/Haas Racing	Swift-Ford 009.c
1999	FedEx Championship Series	4th	Newman/Haas Racing	Swift-Ford 010.c
2000	FedEx Championship Series	8th	Newman/Haas Racing	Lola-Ford B2K/00
2001	FedEx Championship Series	3rd	Team Green	Reynard-Honda 01i
	Indy Racing Northern Lights Series	34th	Team Green	Dallara-Oldsmobile IR1
2002	FedEx Championship Series	9th	Team Motorola	Reynard-Honda 02i Lola-Honda B2/00
	Firestone Indy Racing League	38th	Team Green	Dallara-Chevrolet IR2
2003	IndyCar Series	24th	Andretti Green Racing	Dallara-Honda IR2
2006	IndyCar Series	24th	Andretti Green Racing	Dallara-Honda IR4
2007	IndyCar Series	27th	Andretti Green Racing	Dallara-Honda IR4

=== SCCA National Championship Runoffs ===
Year	Track	Car	Engine	Class	Finish	Start	Status
1981	Road Atlanta	Van Diemen RF81	Ford	Formula Ford	8		Running
1982	Road Atlanta	Lola T640	Ford	Formula Ford	3	1	Running

=== Complete 24 Hours of Le Mans results ===
Year	Team	Co-Drivers	Car	Class	Laps	Pos.	Class Pos.
1982	(United States) Grand Touring Cars Inc.	(United States) Mario Andretti	Mirage-Cosworth M12	C	0	DNS (DSQ)	DNS (DSQ)
1983	(West Germany) Porsche Kremer Racing	(United States) Mario Andretti (France) Philippe Alliot	Porsche 956	C	364	3rd	3rd
1988	(West Germany) Porsche A.G.	(United States) Mario Andretti (United States) John Andretti	Porsche 962C	C1	375	6th	6th
1997	(France) Courage Compétition	(United States) Mario Andretti (France) Olivier Grouillard	Courage-Porsche C36	LMP	197	DNF	DNF

=== Complete 24 Hours of Daytona results ===
Year	Team	Co-Drivers	Car	Class	Laps	Pos.	Class Pos.
1984	(West Germany) Dr. Ing. H. C. F. Porsche	(United States) Mario Andretti	Porsche 962	GTP	127	66th (DNF)	25th (DNF)
1989	(United States) Busby Racing	(United States) Mario Andretti	Porsche 962	GTP	237	47th (DNF)	16th (DNF)
1991	(West Germany) Jochen Dauer Racing	(United States) Mario Andretti (United States) Jeff Andretti	Porsche 962C	GTP	663	5th (DNF)	3rd (DNF)

=== Complete 12 Hours of Sebring results ===
Year	Team	Co-Drivers	Car	Class	Laps	Pos.	Class Pos.
1983	(United States) Henn's Swap Shop Racing	(United Kingdom) Derek Bell (United States) John Paul, Jr.	Porsche 935L	GTP	125	56th (DNF)	9th (DNF)

=== Formula One ===
(key)

Year	Entrant	Chassis	Engine	1	2	3	4	5	6	7	8	9	10	11	12	13	14	15	16	WDC	Points
1993	Marlboro McLaren	McLaren MP4/8	Ford V8	RSA; Ret	BRA; Ret	EUR; Ret	SMR; Ret	ESP; 5	MON; 8	CAN; 14	FRA; 6	GBR; Ret	GER; Ret	HUN; Ret	BEL; 8	ITA; 3	POR	JPN	AUS	11th	7

=== American Open Wheel racing results ===
(key)

==== Formula Super Vee ====
Formula Super Vee results
Year	Team	Chassis	Engine	1	2	3	4	5	6	7	8	9	10	11	Rank	Points
1982	Arciero Racing	Ralt RT5/82	VW Brabham	PHX; 1	CLT; 1	DET; 17	MIL; 14	ROA; 3	MIL; 1	MSP; 1	MCH; Ret	RIV; 1	LS; 2	PHX; 1	1st	152

==== USAC ====
Year	Team	1	2	Rank	Points	Ref
1983-84	Kraco Racing	DQSF	INDY; 5	5th	500	

==== CART ====
Year	Team	No.	Chassis	Engine	1	2	3	4	5-	6	7	8	9	10	11	12	13	14	15	16	17	18	19	20	21	Rank	Points	Ref
1983	Kraco Racing	99	March 83C	Cosworth DFX V8t	ATL	INDY	MIL	CLE	MIS1	ROA	POC	RIV	MDO	MIS2	LVG; 19	LS; 24	PHX; 9									T-26th	4	
1984	Kraco Racing	99	March 84C	Cosworth DFX V8t	LBH; 10	PHX1; 3	INDY; 5	MIL; 4	POR; 12	MEA; 13	CLE; 3	MIS1; 20	ROA; 16	POC; 23	MDO; 16	SAN; 3	MIS2; 7	PHX2; 3	LS; 3	LVG; 24						7th	102	
1985	Kraco Racing	99	March 85C	Cosworth DFX V8t	LBH; 19	INDY; 8	MIL; 19	POR; 28	MEA; 4	CLE; 7	MIS1; 27	ROA; 2	POC; 13	MDO; 14	SAN; 19	MIS2; 25	LS; 9	PHX; 5	MIA; 25							9th	53	
1986	Kraco Racing	18	March 86C	Cosworth DFX V8t	PHX1; 15	LBH; 1	INDY; 6	MIL; 1	POR; 2	MEA; 20	CLE; 2	TOR; 19	MIS1; 11	POC; 11	MDO; 10	SAN; 6	MIS2; 2	ROA; 2	LS; 3	PHX2; 1	MIA; 18					2nd	171	
1987	Kraco Racing	18	March 87C	Cosworth DFX V8t	LBH; 4	PHX; 4	INDY; 29	MIL; 1	POR; 2	MEA; 5	CLE; 6	TOR; 5	MIS; 1	POC; 8	ROA; 16	MDO; 13	NAZ; 1	LS; 22	MIA; 1							2nd	158	
1988	Kraco Racing	18	March 88C	Cosworth DFX V8t	PHX; 3	LBH; 7	INDY; 4	MIL; 7	POR; 11	CLE; 14	TOR; 3	MEA; 6														6th	119	
1988	Kraco Racing	18	Lola T88/00	Cosworth DFX V8t									MIS; 3	POC; 25	MDO; 26	ROA; 5	NAZ; 2	LS; 2	MIA; 17							6th	119	
1989	Newman/Haas Racing	6	Lola T89/00	Chevrolet 265A V8t	PHX; 4	LBH; 2	INDY; 17	MIL; 2	DET; 13	POR; 6	CLE; 18	MEA; 18	TOR; 1	MIS; 1	POC; 3	MDO; 3	ROA; 6	NAZ; 5	LS; 7							3rd	150	
1990	Newman/Haas Racing	3	Lola T90/00	Chevrolet 265A V8t	PHX; 20	LBH; 4	INDY; 20	MIL; 5	DET; 1	POR; 1	CLE; 25	MEA; 1	TOR; 2	MIS; 15	DEN; 5	VAN; 20	MDO; 1	ROA; 1	NAZ; 5	LS; 3						2nd	181	
1991	Newman/Haas Racing	2	Lola T91/00	Chevrolet 265A V8t	SRF; 14	LBH; 16	PHX; 4	INDY; 2	MIL; 1	DET; 19	POR; 1	CLE; 1	MEA; 16	TOR; 1	MIS; 14	DEN; 3	VAN; 1	MDO; 1	ROA; 1	NAZ; 3	LS; 1					1st	234	
1992	Newman/Haas Racing	1	Lola T91/00	Ford XB V8t	SRF; 17	PHX; 10																				2nd	192	
1992	Newman/Haas Racing	1	Lola T92/00	Ford XB V8t			LBH; 16	INDY; 13	DET; 4	POR; 1	MIL; 1	NHM; 2	TOR; 1	MIS; 18	CLE; 2	ROA; 4	VAN; 1	MDO; 21	NAZ; 2	LS; 1						2nd	192	
1994	Chip Ganassi Racing	8	Reynard 94i	Ford XB V8t	SRF; 1	PHX; 20	LBH; 6	INDY; 6	MIL; 4	DET; 5	POR; 31	CLE; 18	TOR; 1	MIS; 22	MDO; 5	NHM; 5	VAN; 3	ROA; 17	NAZ; 9	LS; 28						4th	118	
1995	Newman/Haas Racing	6	Lola T95/00	Ford XB V8t	MIA; 20	SRF; 9	PHX; 2	LBH; 9	NAZ; 22	INDY; 25	MIL; 3	DET; 4	POR; 4	ROA; 27	TOR; 1	CLE; 7	MIS; 25	MDO; 19	NHM; 2	VAN; 21	LS; 4					4th	123	
1996	Newman/Haas Racing	6	Lola T96/00	Ford XD V8t	MIA; 9	RIO; 22	SRF; 19	LBH; 7	NAZ; 1	MIS1; 23	MIL; 1	DET; 1	POR; 11	CLE; 19	TOR; 22	MIS2; 22	MDO; 3	ROA; 1	VAN; 1	LS; 9						2nd	132	
1997	Newman/Haas Racing	6	Swift 007.i	Ford XD V8t	MIA; 1	SRF; 3	LBH; 22	NAZ; 2	RIO; 21	GAT; 11	MIL; 2	DET; 2	POR; 8	CLE; 23	TOR; 4	MIS; 21	MDO; 8	ROA; 26	VAN; 16	LS; 27	FON; 19					8th	108	
1998	Newman/Haas Racing	6	Swift 009.c	Ford XD V8t	MIA; 1	MOT; 14	LBH; 21	NAZ; 18	RIO; 5	GAT; 2	MIL; 26	DET; 10	POR; 17	CLE; 2	TOR; 2	MIS; 6	MDO; 21	ROA; 15	VAN; 2	LS; 10	HOU; 28	SRF; 20	FON; 18			7th	112	
1999	Newman/Haas Racing	6	Swift 010.c	Ford XD V8t	MIA; 2	MOT; 5	LBH; 7	NAZ; 6	RIO; 26	GAT; 1	MIL; 15	POR; 10	CLE; 3	ROA; 2	TOR; 26	MIS; 4	DET; 4	MDO; 8	CHI; 22	VAN; 14	LS; 10	HOU; 3	SRF; 5	FON; 21		4th	151	
2000	Newman/Haas Racing	6	Lola B2K/00	Ford XF V8t	MIA; 22	LBH; 14	RIO; 9	MOT; 1	NAZ; 6	MIL; 2	DET; 13	POR; 4	CLE; 4	TOR; 1	MIS; 2	CHI; 2	MDO; 8	ROA; 19	VAN; 12	LS; 14	GAT; 20	HOU; 13	SRF; 20	FON; 19		8th	127	
2001	Team Motorola	39	Reynard 01i	Honda HR-1 V8t	MTY; 4	LBH; 28	TXS; NH	NAZ; 6	MOT; 23	MIL; 2	DET; 4	POR; 8	CLE; 15	TOR; 1	MIS; 19	CHI; 24	MDO; 26	ROA; 2	VAN; 3	LAU; 4	ROC; 5	HOU; 21	LS; 14	SRF; 2	FON; 7	3rd	147	
2002	Team Motorola	39	Reynard 02i	Honda HR-2 V8t	MTY; 12	LBH; 1*																				9th	110	
2002	Team Motorola	39	Lola B02/00	Honda HR-2 V8t			MOT; 16	MIL; 7	LS; 11	POR; 9	CHI; 15	TOR; 11	CLE; 2	VAN; 6	MDO; 3	ROA; 10	MTL; 8	DEN; 13	ROC; 10	MIA; 8	SRF; 9	FON; 2	MEX; 17			9th	110	

(Event)^{1} : non-championship, exhibition race held day preceding next championship race.

==== IndyCar Series ====
Year	Team	Chassis	No.	Engine	1	2	3	4	5	6	7	8	9	10	11	12	13	14	15	16	17	Rank	Points	Ref
2001	Team Motorola	Dallara IR-01	39	Oldsmobile Aurora V8	PHX	HMS	ATL	INDY; 3	TXS	PPIR	RIR	KAN	NSH	KTY	STL	CHI	TX2					34th	35	
2002	Team Green	Dallara IR-02	39	Chevrolet Indy V8	HMS	PHX	FON	NAZ	INDY; 7	TXS	PPIR	RIR	KAN	NSH	MIS	KTY	STL	CHI	TX2			38th	26	
2003	Andretti Green Racing	Dallara IR-03	7	Honda HI3R V8	HMS; 6	PHX; 13	MOT; 4	INDY; 27	TXS	PPIR	RIR	KAN	NSH	MIS	STL	KTY	NAZ	CHI	FON	TX2		24th	80	
2006	Andretti Green Racing	Dallara IR-05	1	Honda HI6R V8	HMS	STP	MOT	INDY; 3	WGL	TXS	RIR	KAN	NSH	MIL	MIS	KTY	SNM	CHI				24th	35	
2007	Andretti Green Racing	Dallara IR-05	39	Honda HI7R V8	HMS	STP	MOT	KAN	INDY; 13	MIL	TXS	IOW	RIR	WGL	NSH	MDO	MIS	KTY	SNM	DET	CHI	27th	17	

==== Indianapolis 500 results ====
Year	Chassis	Engine	Start	Finish	Team
1984	March	Cosworth	4	5	Kraco
1985	Lola	Cosworth	15	8	Kraco
1986	March	Cosworth	3	6	Kraco
1987	March	Cosworth	9	29	Kraco
1988	March	Cosworth	10	4	Kraco
1989	Lola	Chevrolet	21	17	Newman/Haas
1990	Lola	Chevrolet	5	20	Newman/Haas
1991	Lola	Chevrolet	5	2	Newman/Haas
1992	Lola	Ford-Cosworth	6	13	Newman/Haas
1994	Reynard	Ford-Cosworth	5	6	Ganassi
1995	Lola	Ford-Cosworth	4	25	Newman/Haas
2001	Dallara	Oldsmobile	21	3	Team Green
2002	Dallara	Chevrolet	25	7	Team Green
2003	Dallara	Honda	13	27	Andretti Green
2006	Dallara	Honda	13	3	Andretti Green
2007	Dallara	Honda	11	13	Andretti Green

== See also ==
- Michael Andretti's World GP, a video game that licensed his name

Sporting positions
Preceded by Al Unser Jr.	Robert Bosch US Formula Super Vee; Champion; 1982	Succeeded by Ed Pimm
Preceded by Dave McMillan	FIA Formula Mondial North American Cup; Champion; 1983	Succeeded by Dan Marvin
Preceded by Teo Fabi	Indianapolis 500; Rookie of the Year; 1984; With: Roberto Guerrero	Succeeded by Arie Luyendyk
Preceded by Bobby Rahal	Marlboro Challenge; Winner; 1988	Succeeded by Al Unser Jr.
Preceded by Rick Mears	Marlboro Challenge; Winner; 1991	Succeeded by Emerson Fittipaldi
Preceded by Al Unser Jr.	CART Series; Champion; 1991	Succeeded by Bobby Rahal
