= 1999 Miller Lite 225 =

(United States) 1999 Milwaukee
Race details
- Race 7 of 20 in the 1999 CART season
- Milwaukee Mile
- Date: June 6, 1999
- Official name: 1999 Miller Lite 225 Presented by Kmart
- Location: Milwaukee Mile; West Allis, Wisconsin, West Allis, United States
- Course: Permanent oval course 1 mi / 1.6 km
- Distance: 225 laps 225 mi / 362.102 km
- Weather: Temperatures reaching up to 89.6 °F (32.0 °C); wind speeds up to 25.1 miles per hour (40.4 km/h)

Pole position
- Driver: (Brazil) Hélio Castro-Neves (Hogan Racing)
- Time: 21.931

Fastest lap
- Driver: (Brazil) Hélio Castro-Neves (Hogan Racing)
- Time: 23.517 (on lap 10 of 225)

Podium
- First: (Canada) Paul Tracy (Team KOOL Green)
- Second: (Canada) Greg Moore (Forsythe Racing)
- Third: (Brazil) Gil de Ferran (Walker Racing)

Chronology
Previous	Next
1998	2000

The 1999 Miller Lite 225 Presented by Kmart was the seventh round of the 1999 CART FedEx Champ Car World Series season, held on June 6, 1999, on the Milwaukee Mile in West Allis, Wisconsin.

== Report ==
=== Race ===
After taking his first career pole, Hélio Castro-Neves led the early stages of the race but he then began to slow due to a boost failure and dropped back down the field and eventually retired. The lead went to Jimmy Vasser, but when he got stuck up behind traffic, he was passed by Dario Franchitti. Michael Andretti was charging up through the field and soon took the lead for himself, until he ran over a crew member at the first round of pit stops. The crew member suffered minor injuries, but Andretti lost two laps in getting his car restarted, and another lap due to the black flag. With Franchitti also penalized for running over an air hose and being sent to the back of the cars on the lead lap, Paul Tracy led, but before the stint was over, the Ganassi cars of Vasser and Juan Pablo Montoya both passed him. Montoya jumped Vasser at the next round of stops. They dominated most of the race after that, but Montoya had to pit for fuel with 15 laps left, and Vasser had to do the same 4 laps later. Tracy, helped by a caution period, was able to stretch his fuel and win ahead of Greg Moore, who was also able to do the same, and Gil de Ferran.

== Classification ==
=== Race ===
Pos	No	Driver	Team	Laps	Time/Retired	Grid	Points
1	26	(Canada) Paul Tracy	Team Green	225	1:48:49.169	6	20
2	99	(Canada) Greg Moore	Forsythe Racing	225	+5.880	3	16
3	5	(Brazil) Gil de Ferran	Walker Racing	225	+6.456	16	14
4	12	(United States) Jimmy Vasser	Chip Ganassi Racing	225	+7.937	2	12
5	40	(Mexico) Adrián Fernández	Patrick Racing	225	+9.929	18	10
6	11	(Brazil) Christian Fittipaldi	Newman-Haas Racing	225	+11.251	13	8
7	27	(United Kingdom) Dario Franchitti	Team Green	225	+12.578	4	6
8	17	(Brazil) Maurício Gugelmin	PacWest Racing	225	+15.223	12	5
9	33	(Canada) Patrick Carpentier*	Forsythe Racing	224	+1 Lap	8	4
10	4	(Colombia) Juan Pablo Montoya*	Chip Ganassi Racing	224	+1 Lap	5	3+1
11	25	(Brazil) Cristiano da Matta	Arciero-Wells Racing	224	+1 Lap	7	2
12	18	(Brazil) Roberto Moreno	PacWest Racing	223	+2 Laps	9	1
13	7	(Italy) Max Papis	Team Rahal	222	+3 Laps	17	
14	36	(United States) Alex Barron	All American Racing	222	+3 Laps	10	
15	6	(United States) Michael Andretti	Newman-Haas Racing	222	+3 Laps	11	
16	19	(Mexico) Michel Jourdain Jr.	Payton/Coyne Racing	222	+3 Laps	21	
17	24	(United States) Scott Pruett	Arciero-Wells Racing	222	+3 Laps	15	
18	44	(Brazil) Tony Kanaan	Forsythe Racing	221	+4 Laps	20	
19	2	(United States) Al Unser Jr.	Team Penske	221	+4 Laps	22	
20	20	(United States) P. J. Jones	Patrick Racing	219	+6 Laps	14	
21	10	(United States) Richie Hearn	Della Penna Motorsports	219	+6 Laps	19	
22	34	(United States) Dennis Vitolo	Payton/Coyne Racing	212	+13 Laps	26	
23	16	(Japan) Shigeaki Hattori	Bettenhausen Racing	118	Contact	24	
24	22	(United States) Robby Gordon	Team Gordon	83	Electrical	23	
25	8	(United States) Bryan Herta	Team Rahal	81	Handling	25	
26	9	(Brazil) Hélio Castro-Neves	Hogan Racing	30	Turbo boost	1	1

Notes

1. – Patrick Carpentier and Juan Pablo Montoya were both penalized one lap for passing under yellow. This demoted Carpentier from 4th to 9th and Montoya from 6th to 10th.

== Caution flags ==
Laps	Cause
1	Field not aligned
2-7	Jones (20) spin
62-73	Debris on track
121-130	Hattori (16) contact
211-220	Moreno (18) spin

== Lap Leaders ==
Laps	Leader
1-14	Hélio Castro-Neves
15-46	Jimmy Vasser
47-49	Dario Franchitti
50-65	Michael Andretti
66-105	Paul Tracy
106-124	Jimmy Vasser
125-208	Juan Pablo Montoya
209-212	Jimmy Vasser
213-225	Paul Tracy

Driver	Laps led
Juan Pablo Montoya	84
Jimmy Vasser	55
Paul Tracy	53
Michael Andretti	16
Hélio Castro-Neves	14
Dario Franchitti	3

== Point standings after race ==
Pos	Driver	Points
1	(Colombia) Juan Pablo Montoya	73
2	(United Kingdom) Dario Franchitti	71
3	(Canada) Greg Moore	69
4	(United States) Michael Andretti	61
5	(Brazil) Christian Fittipaldi	61
