= 1998 Miller 200 =

(United States) 1998 Milwaukee
Race details
- Race 7 of 19 in the 1998 CART season
- Milwaukee Mile
- Date: May 31, 1998
- Official name: 1998 Miller 200
- Location: Milwaukee Mile; West Allis, Wisconsin, West Allis, United States
- Course: Permanent oval course 1 mi / 1.6 km
- Distance: 200 laps 200 mi / 321.868 km
- Weather: Temperatures reaching up to 73.4 °F (23.0 °C); wind speeds up to 15 miles per hour (24 km/h)

Pole position
- Driver: (Canada) Patrick Carpentier (Forsythe Racing)
- Time: 20.028

Fastest lap
- Driver: (United States) Scott Pruett (Patrick Racing)
- Time: 21.519 (on lap 109 of 200)

Podium
- First: (United States) Jimmy Vasser (Chip Ganassi Racing)
- Second: (Brazil) Hélio Castro-Neves (Bettenhausen Racing)
- Third: (United States) Al Unser Jr. (Marlboro Team Penske)

Chronology
Previous	Next
1997	1999

The 1998 Miller 200 was the seventh round of the 1998 CART FedEx Champ Car World Series season, held on May 31, 1998, on the Milwaukee Mile in West Allis, Wisconsin. The race was a fuel economy run where fuel conservation was a serious factor, and Jimmy Vasser dominated it and won by over seven seconds, the win being his second of the season.

== Classification ==
=== Race ===
Pos	No	Driver	Team	Laps	Time/Retired	Grid	Points
1	12	(United States) Jimmy Vasser	Chip Ganassi Racing	200	1:34:17.011	5	20+1
2	16	(Brazil) Hélio Castro-Neves	Bettenhausen Racing	200	+7.673	10	16
3	2	(United States) Al Unser Jr.	Team Penske	200	+7.706	7	14
4	27	(United Kingdom) Dario Franchitti	Team Green	200	+11.291	6	12
5	7	(United States) Bobby Rahal	Team Rahal	200	+25.179	12	10
6	10	(United States) Richie Hearn	Della Penna Motorsports	199	+1 Lap	24	8
7	26	(Canada) Paul Tracy	Team Green	199	+1 Lap	14	6
8	1	(Italy) Alex Zanardi	Chip Ganassi Racing	199	+1 Lap	9	5
9	40	(Mexico) Adrián Fernández	Patrick Racing	199	+1 Lap	23	4
10	20	(United States) Scott Pruett	Patrick Racing	199	+1 Lap	13	3
11	8	(United States) Bryan Herta	Team Rahal	198	+2 Laps	21	2
12	18	(United Kingdom) Mark Blundell	PacWest Racing Group	196	+4 Laps	18	1
13	99	(Canada) Greg Moore	Forsythe Racing	195	+5 Laps	2	
14	98	(United States) P. J. Jones	All American Racing	195	+5 Laps	22	
15	19	(Mexico) Michel Jourdain Jr.	Payton/Coyne Racing	194	+6 Laps	25	
16	25	(Italy) Max Papis	Arciero-Wells Racing	194	+6 Laps	19	
17	21	(Brazil) Tony Kanaan	Tasman Motorsports Group	192	+8 Laps	26	
18	3	(Brazil) André Ribeiro	Team Penske	189	+11 Laps	3	
19	9	(Finland) JJ Lehto	Hogan Racing	119	Overheating	8	
20	24	(United States) Robby Gordon	Arciero-Wells Racing	118	Contact	16	
21	17	(Brazil) Maurício Gugelmin	PacWest Racing Group	102	Electrical	11	
22	5	(Brazil) Gil de Ferran	Walker Racing	88	Engine	15	
23	77	(West Germany) Arnd Meier	Davis Racing	82	Handling	20	
24	11	(Brazil) Roberto Moreno	Newman-Haas Racing	49	Electrical	11	
25	33	(Canada) Patrick Carpentier	Forsythe Racing	16	Contact	1	1
26	6	(United States) Michael Andretti	Newman-Haas Racing	16	Contact	4	
DNQ	34	(United States) Dennis Vitolo	Payton/Coyne Racing		Did not Qualify		
DNQ	36	(United States) Alex Barron	All American Racing		Did not Qualify		

== Caution flags ==
Laps	Cause
16-24	Carpentier (33), Andretti (6) contact
28-32	Moreno (11) spin
89-100	de Ferran (5) engine blow-up
119-129	Gordon (24) contact

== Lap Leaders ==
Laps	Leader
1-16	Patrick Carpentier
17-71	Greg Moore
72-73	Jimmy Vasser
74	Hélio Castro-Neves
75-76	Scott Pruett
77-95	Richie Hearn
96-121	Paul Tracy
122-125	Richie Hearn
126-200	Jimmy Vasser

Driver	Laps led
Jimmy Vasser	77
Greg Moore	55
Paul Tracy	26
Richie Hearn	23
Patrick Carpentier	16
Scott Pruett	2
Hélio Castro-Neves	1

== Point standings after race ==
Pos	Driver	Points
1	(Italy) Alex Zanardi	92
2	(Canada) Greg Moore	86
3	(United States) Jimmy Vasser	72
4	(Mexico) Adrián Fernández	59
5	(United States) Michael Andretti	49
