= PPI Motorsports =

Former American racing team

- Owner: Cal Wells
- Base: Charlotte, North Carolina
- Series: Winston/Nextel Cup Series, NASCAR Busch Series
- Manufacturer: Ford, Pontiac, Chevrolet
- Opened: 1979
- Closed: 2006

Career
- Drivers' Championships: 0
- Race victories: 2

PPI Motorsports was an American racing team which competed in CART, NASCAR and various off-road racing circuits. The team had one of the few remaining single car operations in NASCAR until 2006.

== Early years ==
PPI, short for Precision Preparation, Inc., was a company founded by team owner Cal Wells in 1979 in Westminster, California.

At the time, Toyota Motor Sales U.S.A. needed to promote their technology driven line of trucks through participation in Off-Road Championships, the Score Desert Series, including the Baja 500 and Baja 1000, and the Mickey Thompson Entertainment Group stadium truck series. Wells had already been successful in winning off-road races in the U.S. and Mexico and Toyota selected him to personally lead their foray into truck racing in the American market. With Off-Road legend Ivan "Ironman" Stewart, internationally successful brothers Steve and Rod Millen and off-road, IndyCar and NASCAR winner Robby Gordon, PPI and Toyota won 88 races, 11 manufacturer championships including three Baja 1000s, 11 Baja 500s and five Mint 400s.

The company provided parts for off-road racing teams. Over time, PPI eventually began its own off-road team, with help with Toyota Racing Development. PPI fielded off-road trucks for Mickey Thompson's SCORE series and then later fielded trucks which competed in outdoor events such as the Baja 1000. Notable drivers for PPI include Ivan Stewart and a young Robby Gordon (who also drove in CART for the team in 1998).

== CART years ==
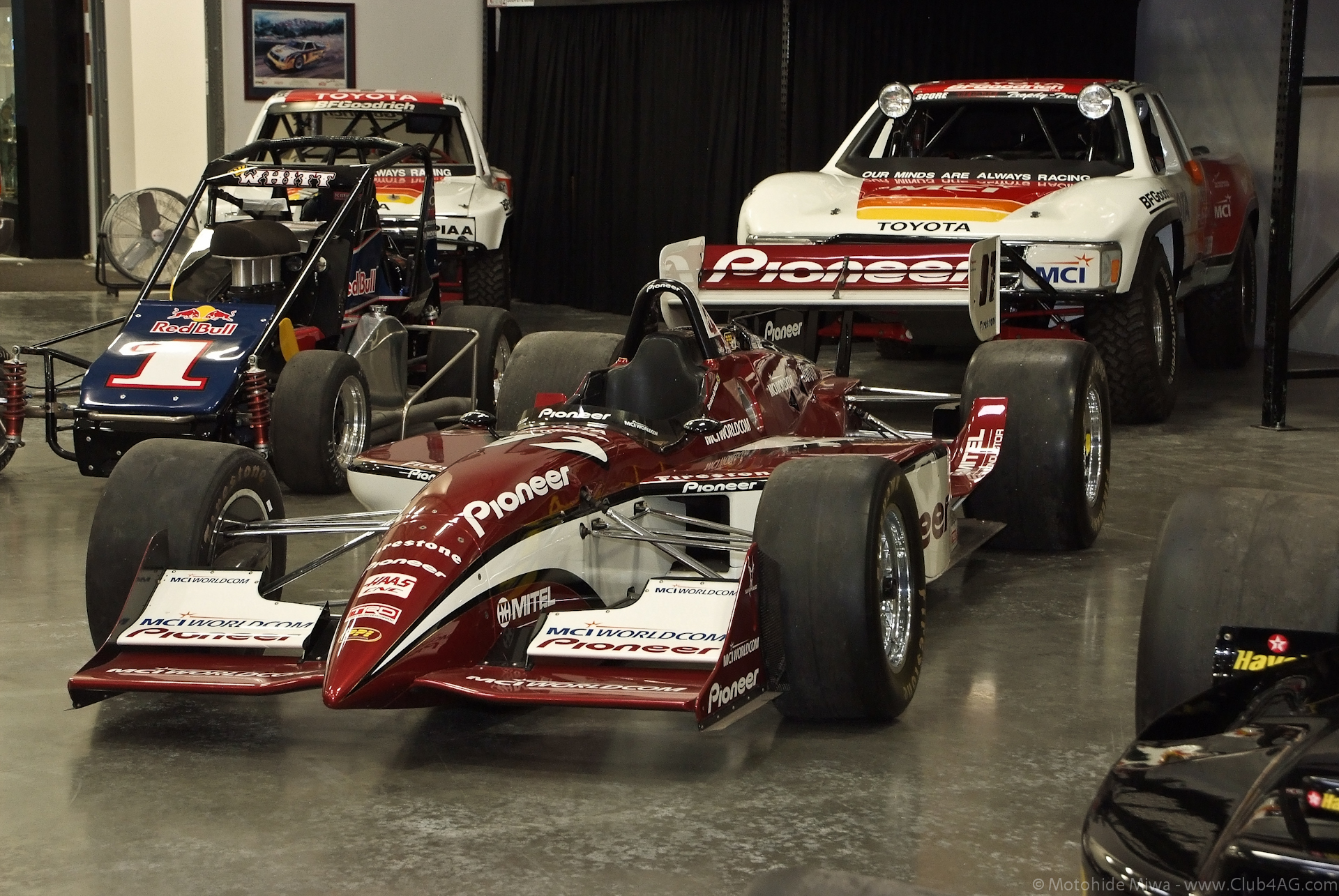
The car from PPI's winning CART effort

In 1995, Wells formed a CART team with Frank Arciero, signing with Toyota in 1996. Their initial driver was Hiro Matsushita. Known as Arciero-Wells, the CART team lasted for 5 years but only a managed a best finish of 4th in 1999 with rookie Cristiano da Matta. In 1996, they began the CART season with Jeff Krosnoff driving, but he died in a tragic accident during the Toronto street race. All PPI cars subsequently carried a decal commemorating Krosnoff's memory.

After Arciero left in 2000, the team was rebranded as PPI Motorsports, and da Matta gave the team its first (and only) career victory in CART. During this time, the team also ran a program in the Toyota Atlantic series, and had success in 2000 with rookie of the year Dan Wheldon. Following the 2000 season, however, PPI shut down its open-wheel and off-road programs, ended its relationship with Toyota, and shifted its focus exclusively on NASCAR.

PPI also competed in Toyota Atlantic from 1998 to 2000, winning races with Anthony Lazzaro, Andrew Bordin, and Dan Wheldon. Lazzaro won the championship for the team in 1999.

== NASCAR years ==
PPI Motorsports was notable in being the first NASCAR team to require pit crew members to wear helmets before the series mandated wearing helmets starting with the 2002 season.

=== Car No. 32 history ===
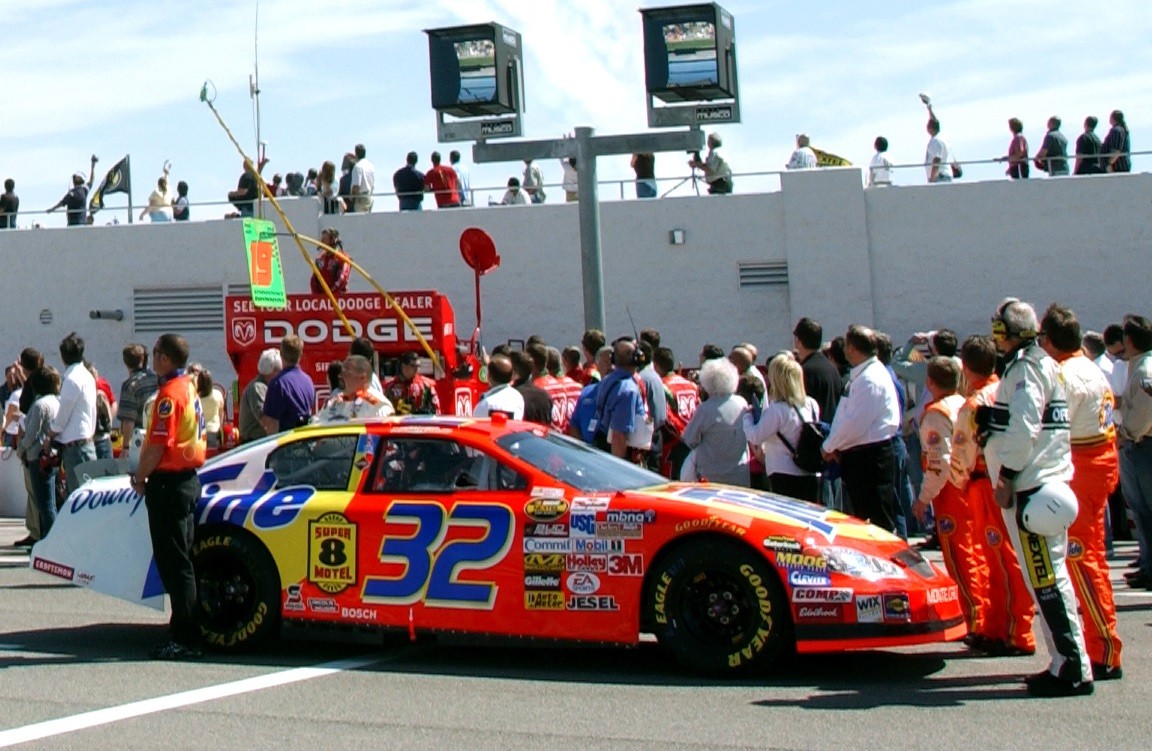
The No. 32 Tide car in 2005

PPI Motorsports started its first Cup team during the 2000 season with open-wheel and Trans Am standout Scott Pruett behind the wheel of the No.32 Tide Ford. The team was hardly a success in its first year, finishing in 37th place and failing to qualify for six races. Pruett was released at the end of the season.

With the team focusing exclusively on NASCAR in 2001, PPI fielded a two-car Winston Cup effort, with Ricky Craven taking over in the 32. Craven had a number of strong races, which he capped giving the team its first career victory at Martinsville in October. He finished 21st in the points standings that year.

Craven ran strong in 2002 and, although he failed to win a race for the team, he managed to improve his point championship standing and finishing 15th overall. This was the team's last season in a Ford, as they switched to Pontiac the next season.

Craven started 2003 the same way, with a strong Top 5 at Rockingham and a famous victory at Darlington, in which he beat Kurt Busch to the finish by 0.002 seconds, which still stands today as one of the smallest margins of victory in NASCAR Cup Series history. It also turned out to be Pontiac's last win in the Winston Cup Series. However, a series of DNF's dropped Craven to 27th in points.

PPI showed clear signs of struggling in 2004 as Craven was unable to give the team a single Top 10 finish through the first 24 races. Wells and Craven parted ways due to lack of results and Busch Series driver Bobby Hamilton Jr. took Craven's place. Hamilton Jr. drove the car for the entire 2005 season. However, he failed to score a Top 10 during the year, and eventually finished 36th. Wells did have some success after replacing Hamilton with road course ringer Ron Fellows at Infineon, with Fellows giving the team an eighth-place finish. Hamilton was replaced by Travis Kvapil, who drove the car for the 2006 season, only to have five DNQ's. Ron Fellows competed in the two road course races at Sonoma and Watkins Glen. After originally finishing 10th at the Glen, Fellows was penalised for skipping a portion of the track and dropped to 32nd.

At the end of the 2006 season, Tide left NASCAR as a full-time sponsor. Unable to find a new sponsor, Wells shut down the team before the 2007 season and sold his owner points to Michael Waltrip Racing.

==== No. 32 Car Results ====
NASCAR Winston/Nextel Cup Series results
Year	Driver	No.	Make	1	2	3	4	5	6	7	8	9	10	11	12	13	14	15	16	17	18	19	20	21	22	23	24	25	26	27	28	29	30	31	32	33	34	35	36	NSCC	Pts!
2000	Scott Pruett	32	Ford	DAY; 19	CAR; DNQ	LVS; 42	ATL; 41	DAR; DNQ	BRI; DNQ	TEX; 27	MAR; 32	TAL; 20	CAL; 34	RCH; 27	CLT; 41	DOV; 38	MCH; 19	POC; 31	SON; 39	DAY; 40	NHA; 30	POC; 36	IND; 10	GLN; DNQ	MCH; 17	BRI; 38	DAR; 24	RCH; 16	NHA; 41	DOV; 42	MAR; DNQ	CLT; DNQ	TAL; 39	CAR; 30	PHO; 34	HOM; 43	ATL; 32			37th	1929
2001	Ricky Craven	32	Ford	DAY; 23	CAR; 5	LVS; 41	ATL; 13	DAR; 27	BRI; 23	TEX; 27	MAR; 28	TAL; 15	CAL; 41	RCH; 43	CLT; 31	DOV; 4	MCH; 35	POC; 43	SON; 16	DAY; 33	CHI; 21	NHA; 38	POC; 10	IND; 9	GLN; 35	MCH; 2	BRI; 38	DAR; 18	RCH; 11	DOV; 26	KAN; 21	CLT; 35	MAR; 1*	TAL; 24	PHO; 8	CAR; 12	HOM; 30	ATL; 38	NHA; 38	21st	3379
2002	Ricky Craven	32	Ford	DAY; 17	CAR; 5	LVS; 31	ATL; 5	DAR; 41	BRI; 13	TEX; 14	MAR; 30	TAL; 18	CAL; 37	RCH; 9	CLT; 3	DOV; 7	POC; 14	MCH; 15	SON; 19	DAY; 23	CHI; 20	NHA; 21	POC; 17	IND; 33	GLN; 34	MCH; 17	BRI; 16	DAR; 14	RCH; 21	NHA; 6	DOV; 9	KAN; 38	TAL; 15	CLT; 36	MAR; 7	ATL; 21	CAR; 9	PHO; 34	HOM; 24	15th	3888
2003	Ricky Craven	32	Pontiac	DAY; 26	CAR; 4	LVS; 36	ATL; 12	DAR; 1	BRI; 15	TEX; 21	TAL; 4	MAR; 27	CAL; 15	RCH; 38	CLT; 38	DOV; 8	POC; 10	MCH; 15	SON; 21	DAY; 43	CHI; 25	NHA; 21	POC; 40	IND; 17	GLN; 28	MCH; 40	BRI; 8	DAR; 8	RCH; 30	NHA; 38	DOV; 40	TAL; 8	KAN; 41	CLT; 19	MAR; 32	ATL; 35	PHO; 38	CAR; 39	HOM; 29	27th	3334
2004	Ricky Craven	32	Chevy	DAY; 23	CAR; 35	LVS; 25	ATL; 22	DAR; 36	BRI; 22	TEX; 28	MAR; 16	TAL; 43	CAL; 18	RCH; 26	CLT; 24	DOV; 16	POC; 34	MCH; 29	SON; 16	DAY; 38	CHI; 38	NHA; 38	POC; 20	IND; 24	GLN; 32	MCH; 35	BRI; 34			NHA; 17										34th	2903
2004	Bobby Hamilton Jr.	32	Chevy																									CAL; 38	RCH; 11		DOV; 29	TAL; 43	KAN; 23	CLT; 15	MAR; 36	ATL; 38	PHO; 16	DAR; 31	HOM; 21	34th	2903
2005	Bobby Hamilton Jr.	32	Chevy	DAY; 35	CAL; 20	LVS; 11	ATL; 38	BRI; 39	MAR; 40	TEX; 39	PHO; 35	TAL; 40	DAR; 30	RCH; 36	CLT; DNQ	DOV; 21	POC; 23	MCH; 31		DAY; 38	CHI; 21	NHA; 28	POC; 23	IND; 39		MCH; 35	BRI; 35	CAL; 23	RCH; 43	NHA; 29	DOV; 33	TAL; DNQ	KAN; 43	CLT; 41	MAR; 30	ATL; DNQ	TEX; 38	PHO; 35	HOM; 36	37th	2348
2005	Ron Fellows	32	Chevy																SON; 8						GLN; 25															37th	2348
2006	Travis Kvapil	32	Chevy	DAY; 27	CAL; DNQ	LVS; 39	ATL; DNQ	BRI; 40	MAR; 34	TEX; 27	PHO; 21	TAL; 19	RCH; 27	DAR; 30	CLT; 22	DOV; 29	POC; 19	MCH; 21		DAY; 30	CHI; 37	NHA; 35	POC; 27	IND; 25		MCH; 21	BRI; 20	CAL; 34	RCH; 28	NHA; 27	DOV; 39	KAN; 19	TAL; DNQ	CLT; 20	MAR; 40	ATL; 32	TEX; 28	PHO; 30	HOM; 27	37th	2648
2006	Ron Fellows	32	Chevy																SON; 37						GLN; 32															37th	2648

=== Car No. 96 history ===
Later in 2000, PPI started a second Cup Series team with backing from Ronald McDonald House Charities. Truck Series driver Andy Houston was to drive the #96 Ford for five races toward the end of the 2000 season, with the intent being for the team to run the full 2001 schedule.

Houston finished no better than 26th in his five starts, but the team still entered the 2001 season having picked up sponsorship from McDonald's, which had been sponsoring Bill Elliott for the previous several years in his owner-driver venture.

The #96 struggled to find its footing. After qualifying ninth for the Daytona 500, Houston fell two laps down before being collected in a massive wreck on lap 175. He then failed to qualify for the next two races at Rockingham and Las Vegas.

Houston would record his best finish at Martinsville in April, where he finished 17th and was the last car running on the lead lap. Two races later he recorded his second top twenty finish, a 19th place run at California Speedway.

After that, Houston's performance declined significantly. He failed to qualify for the races at Michigan, Pocono, and Sears Point in June, and the #96 was entered in neither the July New Hampshire or Pocono races nor the road course event at Watkins Glen. Houston also missed the Southern 500 at Darlington, having failed to qualify for either event there, and the fall race at Richmond.

In the races he did manage to qualify for, Houston also struggled to perform. Although he qualified well again at Daytona in July, he was again collected in a crash. He qualified in the top 15 at both Chicagoland and Indianapolis, but Houston's engine blew three laps into the former event and he crashed on the opening lap in the latter. In all three of these races, Houston finished 43rd and last. In fact, after his top 20 run at California, Houston finished 40th or worse seven times.

McDonald's eventually cooled to the idea of continuing to sponsor Houston because of his poor performances and during the week leading up to the race at Indianapolis, they announced that they would be dropping their full-time sponsorship of the #96 after the inaugural race at Kansas in the fall. Houston finished eighteenth in that race, failing to finish on the lead lap. He was released following the event as no sponsor signed on to replace McDonald's, resulting in the team being shut down.

==== No. 96 Car Results ====
NASCAR Winston Cup Series results
Year	Driver	No.	Make	1	2	3	4	5	6	7	8	9	10	11	12	13	14	15	16	17	18	19	20	21	22	23	24	25	26	27	28	29	30	31	32	33	34	35	36	NWCC	Pts
2000	Andy Houston	96	Ford	DAY	CAR	LVS	ATL	DAR	BRI	TEX	MAR	TAL	CAL	RCH	CLT	DOV	MCH	POC	SON	DAY	NHA	POC	IND	GLN	MCH; 35	BRI	DAR	RCH	NHA	DOV	MAR	CLT; 26	TAL	CAR; 28	PHO; 36	HOM; 42	ATL			55th	314
2001	Andy Houston	96	Ford	DAY; 38	CAR; DNQ	LVS; DNQ	ATL; 21	DAR; DNQ	BRI; 39	TEX; 32	MAR; 17	TAL; 21	CAL; 19	RCH; 42	CLT; 41	DOV; 23	MCH; DNQ	POC; DNQ	SON; DNQ	DAY; 43	CHI; 43	NHA	POC	IND; 43	GLN	MCH; 31	BRI; 40	DAR; DNQ	RCH; DNQ	DOV; 40	KAN; 18	CLT	MAR	TAL	PHO	CAR	HOM	ATL	NHA	46th	1187

== Driver history ==
=== CART ===
- (Japan) Hiro Matsushita (1995, 1997–1998)
- (United States) Jeff Krosnoff (1996)
- (Italy) Max Papis (1996–1998)
- (United States) Robby Gordon (1998)
- (Brazil) Cristiano da Matta (1999–2000)
- (United States) Scott Pruett (1999)
- (Spain) Oriol Servia (2000)

=== NASCAR Winston/Nextel Cup Series ===
- (United States) Scott Pruett (2000)
- (United States) Andy Houston (2000–2001)
- (United States) Ricky Craven (2001–2004)
- (United States) Bobby Hamilton Jr. (2004–2005)
- (Canada) Ron Fellows (2005–2006; road courses only)
- (United States) Travis Kvapil (2006)

=== NASCAR Busch Series ===
- (United States) Anthony Lazzaro (2000)
- (United States) Scott Pruett (2000)
- (United States) Chad Little (2000; one-off race)

(key)

=== Complete CART Results ===
Year	Chassis	Engine	Drivers	No.	1	2	3	4	5	6	7	8	9	10	11	12	13	14	15	16	17	18	19	20	21	Pts Pos	Pos
Arciero Racing
1982					PHX	ATL	MIL	CLE	MCH	MIL	POC	RIV	ROA	MCH	PHX												
1982	Eagle 81	Chevy V8	(United States) Pete Halsmer (R)	66								24	19		24											43	2
1983					ATL	INDY	MIL	CLE	MCH	ROA	POC	RIV	MDO	MCH	CPL	LAG	PHX										
1983	Penske PC-10/82	Cosworth DFX	(United States) Pete Halsmer	66	4	DNQ	9	2	33	14	14	27	24	14	5	20	7									11th	48
1983	Penske PC-10/82	Cosworth DFX	(United States) Johnny Parsons Jr.	66		22																				50th	0
1984					LBH	PHX	INDY	MIL	POR	MEA	CLE	MCH	ROA	POC	MDO	SAN	MCH	PHX	LAG	CPL							
1984	Penske PC-10/82	Cosworth DFX	(United States) Pete Halsmer	11	8	14	DNQ	DNQ												9						29th	9
1984	March 84C	Cosworth DFX	(United States) Pete Halsmer	11					22	26		14		18	13	24	18	18	26							29th	9
1985					LBH	INDY	MIL	POR	MEA	CLE	MCH	ROA	POC	MDO	SAN	MCH	LAG	PHX	MIA								
1985	Lola T900	Cosworth DFX	(United States) Bill Whittington	12	16		DNS	26	16	24							DNQ									21st	15
1985	March 85C	Cosworth DFX	(United States) Bill Whittington	12		14						24		5		17			8							21st	15
1985	Lola T900	Cosworth DFX	(United States) Randy Lanier	12														17								41st	0
1985	Lola T900	Cosworth DFX	(United States) Randy Lanier	57	24	DNQ		22	22	20		14		20			13		15							41st	0
1986					PHX	LBH	INDY	MIL	POR	MEA	CLE	TOR	MCH	POC	MDO	SAN	MCH	ROA	LAG	PHX	MIA						
1986	March 86C	Cosworth DFX	(United States) Randy Lanier	12	11	13	10	20	9	6	9	21	19													20th	21
1986	March 86C	Cosworth DFX	(United States) Jeff MacPherson	12											22			15	13	DNQ						37th	0
1986	March 86C	Cosworth DFX	(United States) Steve Chassey	12													17									44th	0
1986	March 86C	Cosworth DFX	(United States) Eddie Cheever	12																	27					49th	0
1987					LBH	PHX	INDY	MIL	POR	MEA	CLE	TOR	MCH	POC	ROA	MDO	NAZ	LAG	MIA								
1987	March 87C	Cosworth DFX	(Italy) Fabrizio Barbazza (R)	12	17	12	3	14	4	16	24	11	6	14	8	24	13									12th	42
1987	March 87C	Cosworth DFX	(Canada) Ludwig Heimrath	12														23	DNQ							34th	5
1988					PHX	LBH	INDY	MIL	POR	CLE	TOR	MEA	MCH	POC	MDO	ROA	NAZ	LAG	MIA								
1988	March 88C	Cosworth DFX	(Canada) John Jones (R)	12	20	12	DNQ	14	8	7	7	7	8	8	7	13	11	11	16							11th	44
1988	March 88C	Cosworth DFX	(United States) Johnny Parsons Jr.	12			DNQ																			NC	—
1988	March 87C	Cosworth DFX	(United States) Steve Bren	43														17								40th	0
1989					PHX	LBH	INDY	MIL	DET	POR	CLE	MEA	TOR	MCH	POC	MDO	ROA	NAZ	LAG								
1989	Penske PC-17/88	Cosworth DFX	(Belgium) Didier Theys	12	20	23	20	17																		21st	9
1989	Penske PC-17/88	Cosworth DFX	(Italy) Fabrizio Barbazza	12					20	21	26	24	8			20	12		21							24th	6
1989	Penske PC-17/88	Cosworth DFX	(United States) Rich Vogler	12										28												25th	5
1990					PHX	LBH	INDY	MIL	DET	POR	CLE	MEA	TOR	MCH	DEN	VAN	MDO	ROA	NAZ	LAG							
1990	Penske PC-17/88	Buick 3300 V6 tc	(United States) Randy Lewis	12	21	22	14	14	12	16	21	22	17	12	16	17	28	21	20							28th	2
1990	Penske PC-17/88	Cosworth DFX	(United States) Randy Lewis	12																22						28th	2
1990	Penske PC-17/88	Buick 3300 V6 tc	(United States) Rich Vogler	12			DNQ																			NC	—
1990	Penske PC-17/88	Buick 3300 V6 tc	(United States) Rich Vogler	8			DNQ																			NC	—
1990	Penske PC-17/88	Cosworth DFX	(United States) Steve Bren	24		25																				42nd	0
1990	Penske PC-17/88	Buick 3300 V6 tc	(United States) Buddy Lazier (R)	24										26												30th	1
1991					SFR	LBH	PHX	INDY	MIL	DET	POR	CLE	MEA	TOR	MCH	DEN	VAN	MDO	ROA	NAZ	LAG						
1991	Penske PC-17/88	Buick 3300 V6 tc	(United States) Mark Dismore (R)	12	20	21	15	DNQ																		38th	0
1991	Penske PC-17/88	Buick 3300 V6 tc	(United States) Jeff Wood	12						24	20															31st	0
1991	Penske PC-17/88	Buick 3300 V6 tc	(United States) Pancho Carter	12					14																	26th	3
1991	Lola T89/00	Buick 3300 V6 tc	(United States) Pancho Carter	12				21																		26th	3
1991	Lola T89/00	Buick 3300 V6 tc	(Canada) John Jones	12								21	19	10	8	11	15	21	21	13	21					18th	10
1992					SFR	PHX	LBH	INDY	DET	POR	MIL	NHA	TOR	MCH	CLE	ROA	VAN	MDO	NAZ	LAG							
1992	Lola T90/00	Buick 3300 V6 tc	(Italy) Fabrizio Barbazza	30	12	20	21	DNQ																		35th	1
1992	Lola T90/00	Buick 3300 V6 tc	(United States) Johnny Parsons Jr.	30				DNQ																		NC	—
1992	Lola T91/00	Buick 3300 V6 tc	(United States) Jeff Wood	34				DNQ																		34th	1
1992	Lola T91/00	Buick 3300 V6 tc	(United States) Jeff Wood	30					13	19	19	15	13	12												34th	1
1992	Lola T91/00	Buick 3300 V6 tc	(Canada) Jacques Villeneuve, Sr.	30											22	22										52nd	0
1992	Lola T91/00	Buick 3300 V6 tc	(Canada) John Jones	30													12	23	22							36th	1
1992	Lola T91/00	Buick 3300 V6 tc	(Finland) Tero Palmroth	30																28						58th	0
1993					SFR	PHX	LBH	INDY	MIL	DET	POR	CLE	TOR	MCH	NHA	ROA	VAN	MDO	NAZ	LAG							
1993	Penske 21/92	Chevrolet 265B	(United States) Mark Smith (R)	25	18	9	10	DNQ		27	29	15	23			24	22	19	12	17						22nd	8
1994					SFR	PHX	LBH	INDY	MIL	DET	POR	CLE	TOR	MCH	MDO	NHA	VAN	ROA	NAZ	LAG							
1994	Lola T94/00	Ford XB V8t	(Brazil) Marco Greco	25	DNQ	16	23	27	20	24	20	26	15	11	DNQ	16	16	21	17	24						29th	2
Arciero-Wells Racing
1995					MIA	SFR	PHX	LBH	NAZ	INDY	MIL	DET	POR	ROA	TOR	CLE	MCH	MDO	NHA	VAN	LAG						
1995	Reynard 94i	Ford XB	(Japan) Hiro Matsushita	25	26	11	22	19	DNS	10	19	14	17	13	19	13	20	15	22	17	22					28th	5
1996					MIA	RIO	SFR	LBH	NAZ	500	MIL	DET	POR	CLE	TOR	MCH	MDO	ROA	VAN	LAG							
1996	Reynard 96i	Toyota	(United States) Jeff Krosnoff (R)	25	22	26	18	26	18	18	18	15	17	16	16^{1}											35th	0
1996	Reynard 96i	Toyota	(Italy) Max Papis	25													24	9		22						27th	4
1997					MIA	SFR	LBH	NAZ	RIO	GAT	MIL	DET	POR	CLE	TOR	MCH	MDO	ROA	VAN	LAG	FON						
1997	Reynard 97i	Toyota	(Japan) Hiro Matsushita	24	21	25	20	25	23	15	17	19	15	20	22	9	19	24	14	28	23					27th	4
1997	Reynard 97i	Toyota	(Italy) Max Papis	25	19	14	25	22	13	26	19	11	28	27	15	8	14	15	20	14	12					24th	8
1998					MIA	MOT	LBH	NAZ	RIO	GAT	MIL	DET	POR	CLE	TOR	MCH	MDO	ROA	VAN	LAG	HOU	SFR	FON				
1998	Reynard 98i	Toyota	(Japan) Hiro Matsushita	24	23	16	19		15																	30th	0
1998	Reynard 98i	Toyota	(United States) Robby Gordon	24				7		13	20	14	23	23	13	27	11	12	23	13	13	16	9			23rd	13
1998	Reynard 98i	Toyota	(Italy) Max Papis	25	26	13	24	14	28	22	16	18	11	12	8	19	14	11	9	12	5	17	16			21st	25
1999					MIA	MOT	LBH	NAZ	RIO	GAT	MIL	POR	CLE	ROA	TOR	MCH	DET	MDO	CHI	VAN	LAG	HOU	SRF	FON			
1999	Reynard 99i	Toyota	(United States) Scott Pruett	24	22	21	15	10	24	14	17	24	17	25	7	14	8	17	20	13	7	10	9	22		19th	28
1999	Reynard 99i	Toyota	(Brazil) Cristiano da Matta (R)	25	14	25	20	4	21	17	11	11	20	21	24	17	19	9	14	5	22	11	13	23		18th	32
PPI/Wells Racing
2000					MIA	LBH	RIO	MOT	NAZ	MIL	DET	POR	CLE	TOR	MCH	CHI	MDO	ROA	VAN	LAG	GAT	HOU	SRF	FON			
2000	Reynard 2Ki	Toyota RVA	(Spain) Oriol Servià (R)	96	19	6	25	24	9	19	3	8	23	11	8	15	10	10	11	17	5	9	9^{2}	20		15th	60
2000	Reynard 2Ki	Toyota RVA	(Brazil) Cristiano da Matta	97	12	25	4	4	13	14	23	5	3	4*	17	1	17	13	7	15	4	14	4	25		10th	112
Arciero-Blair Racing
2000					MIA	LBH	RIO	MOT	NAZ	MIL	DET	POR	CLE	TOR	MCH	CHI	MDO	ROA	VAN	LAG	GAT	HOU	SRF	FON			
2000	Reynard 2Ki	Mercedes-Benz IC108E V8t	(Brazil) Luiz Garcia Jr.	25	17	12	12	23	15	21	22	14	20	12	11	17	25	24	15	20	25	22	12	DNS		27th	6
2001					MTY	LBH	TEX	NAZ	MOT	MIL	DET	POR	CLE	TOR	MCH	CHI	MDO	ROA	VAN	LAU	ROC	HOU	LAG	SRF	FON		
2001	Lola B2K/00	Phoenix	(Brazil) Max Wilson	25	28	21	C^{3}	17																		25th	12
2001	Lola B2K/00	Ford XF V8t	(Brazil) Max Wilson	25						23	23	4	19	25			15	25	25	18	21	16	24			25th	12
2001	Lola B2K/00	Ford XF V8t	(United States) Alex Barron	25																				13	9	29th	4

1. Jeff Krosnoff died in an accident at the Molson Indy Toronto.
2. Oriol Servià was penalized 4 points for rough driving in Surfers Paradise.
3. The Firestone Firehawk 600 was canceled after qualifying due to excessive g-forces on the drivers.

==== IndyCar win ====
#	Season	Date	Sanction	Track	No.	Winning driver	Chassis	Engine	Tire	Grid	Laps Led	Victory Margin
1	2000	July 30	CART	Chicago Motor Speedway	97	(Brazil) Cristiano da Matta	Reynard 2Ki	Toyota RVA	Firestone	5	51	1.690 sec

==== NASCAR Winston Cup wins ====
#	Season	Date	Track	No.	Winning driver	Chassis	Grid	Laps Led	Victory Margin	Report
1	2001	October 15	Martinsville Speedway	32	Ricky Craven	Ford	6	94	0.141 sec	report
2	2003	March 16	Darlington Raceway	32	Ricky Craven	Pontiac	31	1	0.002 sec	report
