= 505 (disambiguation) =

505 (DV) is a year in the Gregorian calendar (A.D.; Anno Domini; CE; Common Era).

505 may also refer to:

- 505 (dinghy), a sailboat class
- 505 Games, a European video game publisher
- 505 (Nashville), a skyscraper in Nashville, Tennessee, US
- 505 (number)
- "505" (song), a song by Arctic Monkeys from Favourite Worst Nightmare
- Area code 505 in northwest New Mexico
- Indy 505, the 1995 edition of the Indianapolis 500
- Peugeot 505, a large family car
- Fiat 505, a passenger car produced by Fiat between 1919 and 1925
- Roland TR-505 Rhythm Composer, 1986 drum machine and MIDI sequencer

== See also ==
- 505th (disambiguation)
- 500 (disambiguation)
- 100 (disambiguation)
- 5 (disambiguation)
- DV (disambiguation)
