= D5 =

D5 or D05 may refer to:

== Arts and fiction ==
- Dedication 5, a 2013 mixtape by American rapper Lil Wayne
- D5 class Klingon starships, in the Star Trek science fiction series
- Dimension Delete and Deadly Destruction Day, featured in Digimon Xros Wars

== Aviation, transport, vehicles, communications ==
- Albatros D.V, a German World War I fighter plane
- Caterpillar D5
- Citroën D5
- Dauair (IATA code D5)
- Dublin 5, an Irish postal district
- Identification symbol for Nachtjagdgeschwader 3, a Luftwaffe night fighter-wing of World War II
- Land Rover D5 - Land Rover Discovery 5
- Trident D5 ballistic missile
- Volvo D5 engine, an engine family made by Volvo Cars

=== Roads ===
- D5 motorway (Czech Republic)
- D5 road (Croatia), a state road
- Detour for the M5 South Western Motorway, Sydney, Australia

== Substances ==
- Vitamin D_{5}
- D5, also known as DRD5, a subtype of dopamine receptors
- A 5% dextrose solution, a type of intravenous fluid
- Decamethylcyclopentasiloxane, an organosilicon compound
- ATC code D05, Antipsoriatics, a subgroup of the Anatomical Therapeutic Chemical Classification System
- D5, slang for a 5-milligram diazepam tablet

== Other uses ==
- Digital 5, a network of leading digital governments
- D-5 (Panasonic), a professional digital video format
- Demand 5, a video on demand website
- The fifth D: All Things Digital, conference
- Nikon D5, a 20.9 megapixel DSLR camera

== See also ==
- 5D (disambiguation)
- DV (disambiguation)
