= Dimension 5 =

Dimension 5 may refer to:

- Dimension 5 (music group), a Goa trance project from England
- Dimension 5 (album), a 1981 album by John Lindberg
- Dimension 5 (film), a 1966 science fiction/espionage film

== See also ==
- Fifth Dimension (disambiguation)
