= List of Mexican Formula Two champions =

The Mexican Formula 2 championship ran for 12 seasons between 1984 and 1995. In 1996, the championship became known as the Formula 3000 series and ran for 2 years between 1996 and 1997.

| Season | Driver | Car |
Formula K
| 1984 | (Mexico) Enrique Contreras | Enco |
| 1985 | (Mexico) Gilberto Jimenez | CDD Lider |
| 1986 | (Mexico) Gilberto Jimenez | CDD Lider |
| 1987 | (Mexico) Gerardo Martinez | Martiga |
| 1988 | (Mexico) Oscar Manautou | Martiga |
| 1989 | (Mexico) Gerardo Martinez | Martiga |
Formula 2
| 1990 | (Mexico) Enrique Contreras | March |
| 1991 | (Mexico) Carlos Guerrero | March |
| 1992 | (Mexico) Carlos Guerrero | March |
| 1993 | (Canada) Allen Berg | Ralt |
| 1994 | (Mexico) Fernando Plata | Ralt |
| 1995 | (Mexico) Jimmy Morales | Ralt |
| 1996 | (Mexico) David Martinez | Ralt |
| 1997 | (Mexico) Ricardo Pérez | Ralt |
Formula 3000
| 1996 | (Mexico) Jaime Cordero | Lola T96/70-Chrysler V6 |
| 1997 | (Mexico) Jimmy Morales | Lola T96/70-Chrysler V6 |
Indy Lights
| 1998 | (Brazil) Osvaldo Negri | Lola |
| 1999 | (Argentina) Waldemar Coronas | Lola |
| 2000 | (Argentina) Waldemar Coronas | Lola |
| 2001 | (Canada) Allen Berg | Lola |
