= Mario Domínguez (racing driver) =

Mexican racing driver

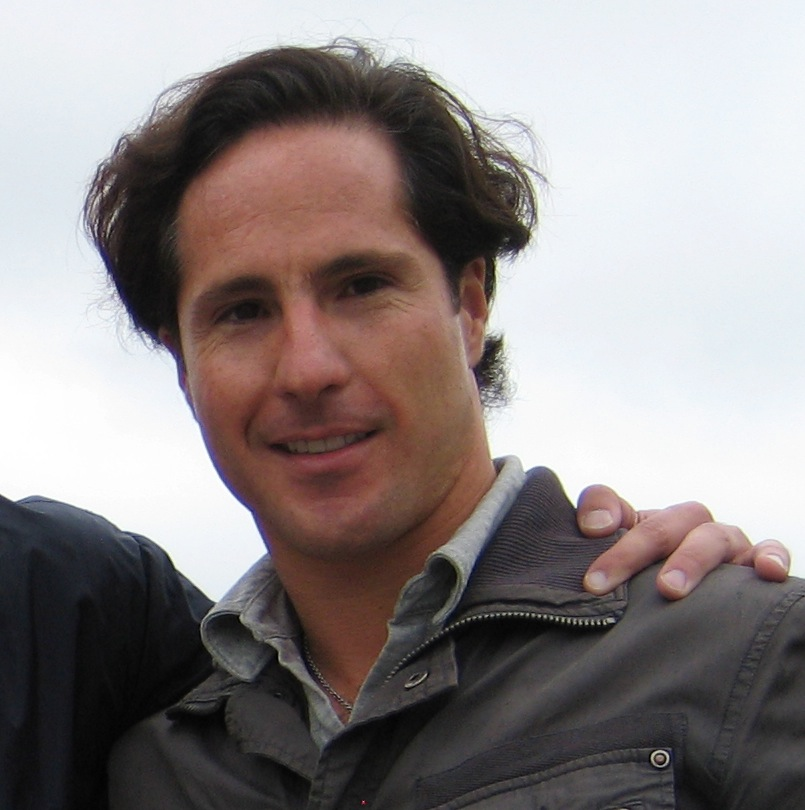
- Mario Domínguez at the Indianapolis Motor Speedway in 2008
- Nationality: Mexican
- Born: Mario Domínguez; December 1, 1975 (age 50) Mexico City

IRL IndyCar Series career
- Debut season: 2008
- Categorisation: FIA Silver
- Starts: 7
- Wins: 0
- Poles: 0
- Best finish: 27th in 2008

CART/CCWS Championship Car
- Years active: 2002-2007
- Teams: Herdez Competition; Forsythe Championship Racing; Dale Coyne Racing; Rocketsports Racing; PKV Racing; Minardi Team USA; Pacific Coast Motorsports
- Starts: 86
- Wins: 2
- Poles: 1
- Best finish: 5th in 2004

Previous series
- 1999-2001 1993, 1998 1996-1997 1994-1995 1992: Indy Lights; Mexican Formula Three Championship; Mexican Formula 3000 Championship; Mexican Formula Three Nissan Championship; U.S. Formula Russell Mazda Championship

Championship titles
- 1998 1992: Mexican Formula Three Championship; U.S. Formula Russell Mazda Championship

Awards
- 2002: CART Champ Car Rookie of the Year

Mario Domínguez (born December 1, 1975, in Mexico City) is a Mexican racing driver. He has competed in the CART and CCWS Champ Car series and later the IndyCar Series.

== Early career ==
Domínguez first began racing in 1987 driving go-karts. He won three go-karting championships and represented Mexico in the World Karting Championships in Spain (1989), Italy (1990) and France (1991). He then raced in numerous developmental series in Mexico, eventually winning the Mexican Formula Three Championship in 1998 and moving to the American Indy Lights series full-time in 1999, finishing eighth in the championship in 2000 and fourth in the series' final year, 2001. He was slated to make his Champ Car debut in the first race of the 2001 season in his home county's race in Monterrey for the new Millennium Motorsports team, but the car never appeared.

== CART/Champ Car ==
Domínguez made his CART/Champ Car debut the following year in 2002 and became Rookie of the Year, with his first Champ Car victory in 2002 at the Honda Indy 300, although this was in a rain-shortened race largely dictated by the safety car. He was more competitive in 2003, winning the Grand Prix Americas in Miami. In 2004, Domínguez had his best season to date by finishing fifth in the final standings. This success with Herdez Competition allowed him to sign with the Forsythe team for 2005. However, Domínguez saw limited success at Forsythe. After the first four races of the 2006 season where he crashed into his teammate Paul Tracy on the first lap twice, Domínguez and Forsythe parted ways. Before the next Champ Car race in Portland, Domínguez signed on to Dale Coyne Racing to drive the Sonny's BBQ Ford Lola-Cosworth. For the final three races of the season, Domínguez secured sponsorship from Mexican state-owned petroleum company Pemex to race for the slightly more competitive Rocketsports team. Along with Champ Car racing, Mario tested a Jordan Grand Prix Formula One racing car at the Silverstone circuit in Northamptonshire, England, in 2005.

In 2007, Domínguez signed with Forsythe for the first three races of the season after obtaining sponsorship from Telmex, but was dropped after just a few rounds in favour of Oriol Servià. He remained out of a Champ Car ride until he replaced an injured Tristan Gommendy at PKV Racing at the Rexall Grand Prix of Edmonton. The following week at the San Jose Grand Prix, he signed on with Pacific Coast Motorsports to fill in for Ryan Dalziel, who was injured in a bicycling accident. Dalziel recovered enough to return to racing two weeks later at Generac Grand Prix at Road America, returning Domínguez to the sidelines. But at the Belgian Grand Prix at Zolder, Mario was again called on as a substitute after Dan Clarke of Minardi Team USA was suspended for the weekend after causing a multi-car crash in a practice session.

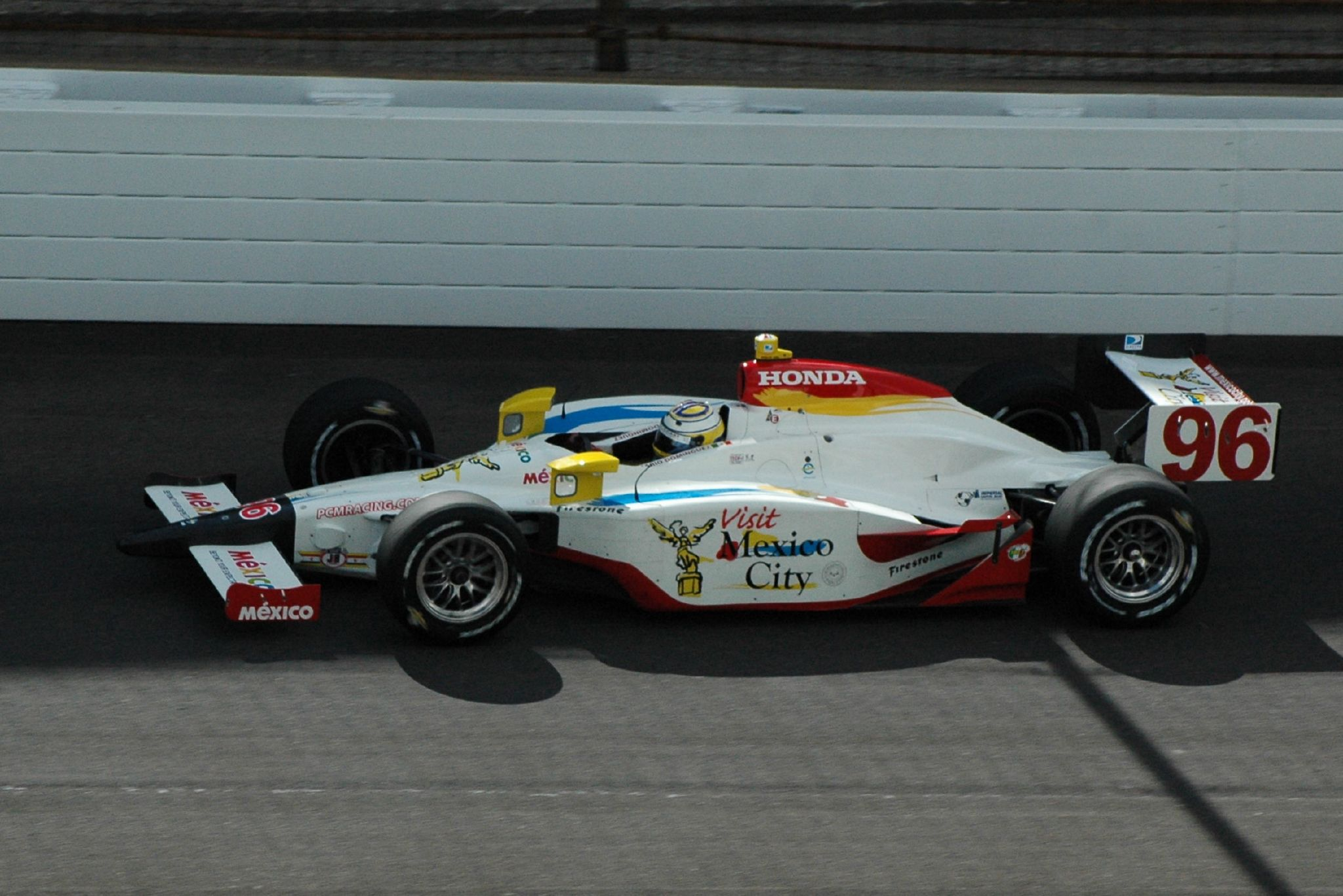
Dominguez practicing for the 2008 Indy 500 - he ultimately crashed during his last qualification attempt

== IndyCar Series ==
In 2008, Domínguez announced that he would enter the remainder of the 2008 IndyCar Series season with Pacific Coast Motorsports, after placing third in the final Champ Car race at Long Beach. He was bumped from the field at the 2008 Indianapolis 500 and made his first true start in the series in the following race at the Milwaukee Mile. Since his 21st place finish at Texas Motor Speedway in June, Domínguez's team skipped the next events to re-evaluate their program to be more competitive when they return. They returned on a road course only schedule and participated in the Watkins Glen, Mid-Ohio, Edmonton, and Infineon races to close out the season. His best finish of the season came at Watkins Glen in thirteenth place. He finished 27th in points.

== FIA GT ==
In 2009, Domínguez was offered a drive for the K Plus K Motorsport team without needing to bring sponsorship. This was not his first sportscar event, since he raced for Risi Competizione in the American Le Mans Series team in 2006.

== Motorsports career results ==
=== American open–wheel racing results ===
(key) (Races in bold indicate pole position) (Races in italics indicate fastest lap)

==== Indy Lights ====
Year	Team	1	2	3	4	5	6	7	8	9	10	11	12	13	14	Rank	Points	Ref
1992	Landford Racing	PHX	LBH	DET	POR	MIL	NHA	TOR	CLE	VAN	MDO	NAZ	LS; 17			NC	0	
1998	Herdez Competition Team	MIA	LBH	NAZ	STL	MIL	DET	POR	CLE	TOR	MIS	TRO	VAN; 14	LS; 7	FON	**25th**	**6**	
1999	Team Mexico Quaker Herdez	**MIA**; 1	LBH; 6	NAZ; 17	MIL; 16	POR; 15	CLE; 9	TOR; 20	MIS; 4	DET; 17	CHI; 5	LS; 16	FON; 5			**11th**	**66**	
2000	Team Mexico Quaker Herdez	LBH; 10	MIL; 3	DET; 5	POR; 6	MIS; 7	CHI; 11	MDO; 11	VAN; 5	LS; 10	STL; 6	HOU; 12	FON; 16			**8th**	**67**	
2001	PacWest Lights	MTY; 4	**LBH**; 4	TXS; 6	MIL; 2	POR; 11	**KAN**; 10	TOR; 2	MDO; 6	STL; 2	ATL; 4	LS; 10	FON; 5			**4th**	**120**	

==== CART/Champ Car ====
Year	Team	No.	Chassis	Engine	1	2	3	4	5	6	7	8	9	10	11	12	13	14	15	16	17	18	19	Rank	Points	Ref
2002	Herdez Competition	16	Lola B02/00	Ford XF	MTY; 17	LBH; 14	MOT; 11	MIL; 17																18th	**37**	
2002	Herdez Competition	55	Lola B02/00	Ford XF					LS; 15	POR; 10	CHI; 11	TOR; 18	CLE; 17	VAN; 10	MDO; 16	ROA; 8	MTL; 17	DEN; 14	ROC; 13	MIA; 11	SRF; 1	FON; 16	MXC; 18	18th	**37**	
2003	Herdez Competition	55	Lola B02/00	Ford XFE	STP; 14	MTY; 13	LBH; 5	BRH; 3	LAU; 2	MIL; 8	LS; 10	POR; 10	CLE; 5	TOR; 12	VAN; 10	ROA; 14	MDO; 16	MTL; 5	DEN; 7	MIA; 1	MXC; 3	SRF; 10		6th	**118**	
2004	Herdez Competition	55	Lola B02/00	Ford XFE	LBH; 5	MTY; 3	MIL; 8	POR; 17	CLE; 8	TOR; 17	VAN; 6	ROA; 5	DEN; 4	MTL; 3	LS; 11	LVS; 7	SRF; 3	MXC; 8						5th	**244**^	
2005	Forsythe Racing	7	Lola B02/00	Ford XFE	LBH; 5	MTY; 13	MIL; 7	POR; 4	CLE; 17	TOR; 13	EDM; 5	SJO; 5	DEN; 2	MTL; 10	LVS; 4	SRF; 18	MXC; 12							9th	**198**	
2006	Forsythe Racing	7	Lola B02/00	Ford XFE	LBH; 4	**HOU**; 3	MTY; 6	MIL; 14																9th	**202**	
2006	Dale Coyne Racing	19	Lola B02/00	Ford XFE					POR; 14	CLE; 6	TOR; 11	EDM; 8	SJO; 5	DEN; 13	MTL; 10									9th	**202**	
2006	Rocketsports Racing	8	Lola B02/00	Ford XFE												ROA; 12	SRF; 2	MXC; 17						9th	**202**	
2007	Forsythe Racing	7	Panoz DP01	Cosworth XFE	LVS; 9	LBH; 17	HOU; 6	POR	CLE	MTT	TOR													18th	**78**	
2007	PKV Racing	22	Panoz DP01	Cosworth XFE								EDM; 17												18th	**78**	
2007	Pacific Coast Motorsports	28	Panoz DP01	Cosworth XFE									SJO; 12	ROA			SRF; 12	MXC; 8						18th	**78**	
2007	Minardi Team USA	4	Panoz DP01	Cosworth XFE											ZOL; 17	ASN								18th	**78**	

- ^ New points system implemented in 2004

==== IndyCar Series ====
Year	Team	No.	Chassis	Engine	1	2	3	4	5	6	7	8	9	10	11	12	13	14	15	16	17	18	19	Rank	Points	Ref
2008	Pacific Coast Motorsports	96	Panoz DP01	Cosworth XFE	HMS	STP	MOT^{1} DNP	LBH^{1} 3	KAN															27th	112	
2008	Pacific Coast Motorsports	96	Dallara	Honda						INDY; DNQ	MIL; 26	TXS; 21	IOW	RIR	WGL; 13	NSH	MDO; 19	EDM; 24	KTY	SNM; 16	DET	CHI	SRF^{2}	27th	112	

^{1} Run on same day.
^{2} Non-points-paying, exhibition race.

Years	Teams	Races	Poles	Wins	Podiums (Non-win)	Top 10s (Non-podium)	Indianapolis 500 Wins	Championships
1	1	7	0	0	1	0	0	0

=== Complete TCR World Tour results ===
(key) (Races in bold indicate pole position) (Races in italics indicate fastest lap)

Year	Team	Car	1	2	3	4	5	6	7	8	9	10	11	12	13	14	15	16	17	18	19	20	21	DC	Points
2025	Apycsa Racing Team	Audi RS 3 LMS TCR	AHR; 1; 23	AHR; 2	AHR; 3	CRT; 1	CRT; 2	CRT; 3	MNZ; 1	MNZ; 2	CVR; 1	CVR; 2	BEN; 1	BEN; 2	BEN; 3	INJ; 1	INJ; 2	INJ; 3	ZHZ; 1	ZHZ; 2	ZHZ; 3	MAC; 1	MAC; 2	NC†	0†

^{†} As Domínguez was a TCR National Series entry, he was ineligible for points.

Sporting positions
Preceded by Scott Dixon	CART Rookie of the Year; 2002	Succeeded by Sébastien Bourdais
