= DVS =

DVS may refer to:

== Organizations and companies ==
- Delta Valley and Southern Railway (DVS), Wilson, Arkansas, US, a short-line railroad
- Descriptive Video Service, a US producer of video for the visually impaired
- Deutsche Verkehrsfliegerschule, a German military flight training school (1925–1945)
- Digital Video Systems, a German digital cinema company
- DVS Records, a Dutch record label
- DVS Shoes
- D.V.S. Senior Honor Society, at Emory University, Atlanta, Georgia, US
- Driver and Vehicle Services, a division of the Minnesota Department of Public Safety

== Technology and science ==
- Digital vinyl system, a turntable interface allowing DJs to control digital music
- Divinyl sulfide, an organic compound
- Distributed vibration sensing
- Dynamic vapor sorption, a chemistry measurement method
- Dynamic vision sensor, a digital camera which responds to local changes in brightness
- Dynamic voltage scaling, a computer power management technique

== Other uses ==
- D.V.S* (Derek VanScoten, active since 2009), American electronic music producer / guitarist

== See also ==
- Developing Virtue Secondary School (DVSS), Talmage, California, US
- DV (disambiguation)
