= 505th =

505th may refer to:

- 505th Bombardment Group, inactive United States Air Force unit
- 505th Bombardment Squadron, part of the 319th Air Refueling Wing at Grand Forks Air Force Base, North Dakota
- 505th Brigade, Brigade of the Army of the Republic of Bosnia and Herzegovina
- 505th Command and Control Wing, organized under the USAF Warfare Center
- 505th Fighter Squadron or 138th Fighter Squadron, squadron of the United States Air Force
- 505th Infantry Regiment (United States), an airborne forces regiment of the US Army

== See also ==
- 505 (number)
- 505, the year 505 (DV) of the Julian calendar
- 505 BC
