= 2001 Indy Lights season =

- PPG/Dayton Indy Lights Championship Powered by Buick

Season
- Races: 12
- Start date: March 11
- End date: November 4

Awards
- Drivers' champion: (United States) Townsend Bell
- Teams' champion: (United States) Dorricott Racing
- Rookie of the Year: (United Kingdom) Dan Wheldon

The 2001 CART PPG/Dayton Indy Lights Championship Powered By Buick consisted of 12 races. It was dominated by Townsend Bell who captured six victories on his way to the championship. It was the last Indy Lights season, as the series organizer, CART, decided to drop the Indy Lights series and concentrate its efforts on the Toyota Atlantic Championship. Most former Indy Lights teams that wished to stay in business went either to the Atlantic series, which replaced Indy Lights as the support race at most CART events, or the new Infiniti Pro Series, which ran in support of Indy Racing League events.

All teams used the Lola T97/20-Buick spec car. Each round of the championship seldom had more than 12 entries.

The scoring system was 20-16-14-12-10-8-6-5-4-3-2-1 points awarded to the first 12 (twelve) finishers, with 1 (one) extra point given to the driver who took pole-position, and another extra point given to the driver who led most laps in the race.

== Team and driver chart ==
All teams utilized Lola T97/20 chassis with Buick V6 engines.

Team	No.	Drivers	Round(s)
Brian Stewart Racing	2	(United States) Larry Mason	2
Brian Stewart Racing	3	(New Zealand) Andy Booth	2
Conquest Racing	11	(Denmark) Kristian Kolby	1–8
Conquest Racing	11	(New Zealand) Matt Halliday	12
Conquest Racing	21	(New Zealand) Matt Halliday	4–11
Conquest Racing	21	(Brazil) Nilton Rossoni	1
Dorricott Racing	30	(United States) Townsend Bell	All
Dorricott Racing	31	(Republic of Ireland) Damien Faulkner	All
Dorricott Racing	32	(United States) Jon Fogarty	1–4, 10–11
Dorricott Racing	32	(United States) Geoff Boss	7–8
Indy Regency Racing	12	(United States) Cory Witherill	1–2, 4–12
Mexpro Racing	15	(Mexico) Rudy Junco Jr.	1–6, 8–9, 11–12
Mexpro Racing	16	(Republic of Ireland) Derek Higgins	All
PacWest Lights	1	(United Kingdom) Dan Wheldon	All
PacWest Lights	17	(Mexico) Mario Domínguez	All
Roquin Motorsports	64	(Mexico) Rolando Quintanilla	All
Roquin Motorsports	65	(Mexico) Luis Díaz	All

== Schedule ==
Rd.	Date	Track	Location
1	March 11	R Fundidora Park	Monterrey, Mexico
2	April 8	R Long Beach street circuit	Long Beach, California
3	April 28	O Texas Motor Speedway	Fort Worth, Texas
4	June 3	O Milwaukee Mile	West Allis, Wisconsin
5	June 24	R Portland International Raceway	Portland, Oregon
6	July 8	O Kansas Speedway	Kansas City, Kansas
7	July 15	R Exhibition Place	Toronto, Canada
8	August 12	R Mid-Ohio Sports Car Course	Lexington, Ohio
9	August 26	O Gateway International Raceway	Madison, Illinois
10	October 5	R Road Atlanta	Braselton, Georgia
11	October 14	R Laguna Seca Raceway	Monterey, California
12	November 4	O California Speedway	Fontana, California

== Race results ==
Round	Circuit	Pole position	Fastest lap	Most laps led	Race winner	
Round	Circuit	Pole position	Fastest lap	Most laps led	Driver	Team
1	(Mexico) Fundidora Park	(Republic of Ireland) Derek Higgins	(Mexico) Mario Domínguez	(Republic of Ireland) Derek Higgins	(Republic of Ireland) Derek Higgins	Mexpro Racing
2	(United States) Long Beach street circuit	(Mexico) Mario Domínguez	(United States) Townsend Bell	(United Kingdom) Dan Wheldon	(United States) Townsend Bell	Dorricott Racing
3	(United States) Texas Motor Speedway	(Republic of Ireland) Damien Faulkner	(United States) Jon Fogarty	(Republic of Ireland) Damien Faulkner	(Republic of Ireland) Damien Faulkner	Dorricott Racing
4	(United States) Milwaukee Mile	(United States) Townsend Bell (Note: Qualifying was cancelled due to rain. The grid was set by entrant points entering the race.)	(United States) Townsend Bell	(United States) Townsend Bell	(United States) Townsend Bell	Dorricott Racing
5	(United States) Portland International Raceway	(United States) Townsend Bell	(United States) Townsend Bell	(Republic of Ireland) Damien Faulkner	(Republic of Ireland) Damien Faulkner	Dorricott Racing
6	(United States) Kansas Speedway	(Mexico) Mario Domínguez	(Republic of Ireland) Damien Faulkner	(United States) Townsend Bell	(Denmark) Kristian Kolby	Conquest Racing
7	(Canada) Exhibition Place	(United States) Townsend Bell	(United States) Townsend Bell	(United States) Townsend Bell	(United States) Townsend Bell	Dorricott Racing
8	(United States) Mid-Ohio Sports Car Course	(United States) Townsend Bell	(United States) Townsend Bell	(United States) Townsend Bell	(United States) Townsend Bell	Dorricott Racing
9	(United States) Gateway International Raceway	(United States) Townsend Bell	(United Kingdom) Dan Wheldon	(United States) Townsend Bell	(United Kingdom) Dan Wheldon	PacWest Lights
10	(United States) Road Atlanta	(United States) Townsend Bell	(United States) Jon Fogarty	(United States) Townsend Bell	(United Kingdom) Dan Wheldon	PacWest Lights
11	(United States) Laguna Seca Raceway	(United States) Townsend Bell	(Mexico) Luis Díaz	(United States) Townsend Bell	(United States) Townsend Bell	Dorricott Racing
12	(United States) California Speedway	(United States) Townsend Bell	(Mexico) Mario Domínguez	(United States) Townsend Bell	(United States) Townsend Bell	Dorricott Racing

== Race summaries ==
=== Monterrey ===
- March 11, 2001
- Fundidora Park, Monterrey, Mexico
- Pole position: Derek Higgins, 1:25.345, 88.750 mph (142.829 km/h)

Top Five Finishers
Fin. Pos	St. Pos	Car No.	Driver	Team	Laps	Time	Laps Led	Points
1	1	16	(Republic of Ireland) Derek Higgins	Mexpro Racing	35	54:48.128	35	22
2	3	30	(United States) Townsend Bell	Dorricott Racing	35	+0.179	0	16
3	5	32	(United States) Jon Fogarty	Dorricott Racing	35	+5.799	0	14
4	4	17	(Mexico) Mario Domínguez	PacWest Lights	35	+6.334	0	12
5	10	1	(United Kingdom) Dan Wheldon	PacWest Lights	35	+9.437	0	10
Race average speed: 80.625 mph (129.753 km/h)
Lead changes: 0
Cautions: 0

=== Long Beach ===
- April 8, 2001
- Long Beach street circuit, Long Beach, California
- Pole position: Mario Domínguez, 1:15.968, 93.260 mph (150.087 km/h)

Top Five Finishers
Fin. Pos	St. Pos	Car No.	Driver	Team	Laps	Time	Laps Led	Points
1	6	30	(United States) Townsend Bell	Dorricott Racing	38	57:13.430	5	20
2	3	1	(United Kingdom) Dan Wheldon	PacWest Lights	38	+3.775	33	17
3	5	16	(Republic of Ireland) Derek Higgins	Mexpro Racing	38	+5.342	0	14
4	1	17	(Mexico) Mario Domínguez	PacWest Lights	38	+5.862	0	13
5	7	11	(Denmark) Kristian Kolby	Conquest Racing	38	+12.326	0	10
Race average speed: 78.412 mph (126.192 km/h)
Lead changes: 1 between 2 drivers
Cautions: 3 for 11 laps

=== Texas ===
- April 28, 2001
- Texas Motor Speedway, Fort Worth, Texas
- Pole position: Damien Faulkner, 0:29:060, 183.593 mph (295.464 km/h)
- The CART race that weekend was cancelled due to track incompatibility, so this was the only race completed that weekend.

Top Five Finishers
Fin. Pos	St. Pos	Car No.	Driver	Team	Laps	Time	Laps Led	Points
1	1	31	(Republic of Ireland) Damien Faulkner	Dorricott Racing	67	39:35.632	65	22
2	4	16	(Republic of Ireland) Derek Higgins	Mexpro Racing	67	+0.349	1	16
3	3	11	(Denmark) Kristian Kolby	Conquest Racing	67	+0.529	0	14
4	7	65	(Mexico) Luis Díaz	Roquin Motorsports	67	+0.737	0	12
5	10	64	(Mexico) Rolando Quintanilla	Roquin Motorsports	67	+1.127	0	10
Race average speed: 150.491 mph (242.192 km/h)
Lead changes: 3 between 3 drivers
Cautions: 2 for 8 laps

=== Milwaukee ===
- June 3, 2001
- Milwaukee Mile, West Allis, Wisconsin
- Pole position: Townsend Bell (qualifying rained out; grid determined by championship points)

Top Five Finishers
Fin. Pos	St. Pos	Car No.	Driver	Team	Laps	Time	Laps Led	Points
1	1	30	(United States) Townsend Bell	Dorricott Racing	100	43:27.503	100	21
2	6	17	(Mexico) Mario Domínguez	PacWest Lights	99	-1 lap	0	16
3	5	1	(United Kingdom) Dan Wheldon	PacWest Lights	98	-2 laps	0	14
4	9	65	(Mexico) Luis Díaz	Roquin Motorsports	97	-3 laps	0	12
5	8	15	(Mexico) Rudy Junco Jr.	Mexpro Racing	97	-3 laps	0	10
Race average speed: 142.481 mph (229.301 km/h)
Lead changes: none
Cautions: 1 for 4 laps

=== Portland ===
- June 24, 2001
- Portland International Raceway, Portland, Oregon
- Pole position: Townsend Bell, 1:04.991, 109.067 mph (175.526 km/h)

Top Five Finishers
Fin. Pos	St. Pos	Car No.	Driver	Team	Laps	Time	Laps Led	Points
1	3	31	(Republic of Ireland) Damien Faulkner	Dorricott Racing	38	58:58.791	16	21
2	8	15	(Mexico) Rudy Junco Jr.	Mexpro Racing	38	+16.134	0	16
3	7	13	(Republic of Ireland) Derek Higgins	Mexpro Racing	38	+20.501	0	14
4	10	21	(New Zealand) Matt Halliday	Conquest Racing	38	28.936	0	12
5	9	64	(Mexico) Rolando Quintanilla	Roquin Motorsports	38	+28.936	0	10
Race average speed: 76.116 mph (122.497 km/h)
Lead changes: 1 between 2 drivers
Cautions: 3 for 8 laps

=== Kansas ===
- July 8, 2001
- Kansas Speedway, Kansas City, Kansas
- Pole position: Mario Domínguez, 0:30.252, 180.881 mph (291.100 km/h)

Top Five Finishers
Fin. Pos	St. Pos	Car No.	Driver	Team	Laps	Time	Laps Led	Points
1	6	11	(Denmark) Kristian Kolby	Conquest Racing	67	40:25.322	19	20
2	7	31	(Republic of Ireland) Damien Faulkner	Dorricott Racing	67	+0.001	0	16
3	4	1	(United Kingdom) Dan Wheldon	PacWest Lights	67	+0.213	0	14
4	3	21	(New Zealand) Matt Halliday	Conquest Racing	67	+0.962	3	12
5	2	30	(United States) Townsend Bell	Dorricott Racing	67	+0.017‡	27	11
Race average speed: 151.323 mph (243.531 km/h)
Lead changes: 9 between 4 drivers
Cautions: 2 for 7 laps

‡Townsend Bell was penalized two positions for aggressive driving.

=== Toronto ===
- July 15, 2001
- Exhibition Place, Toronto, Ontario
- Pole position: Townsend Bell, 1:04.202, 98.408 mph (158.372 km/h)

Top Five Finishers
Fin. Pos	St. Pos	Car No.	Driver	Team	Laps	Time	Laps Led	Points
1	1	30	(United States) Townsend Bell	Dorricott Racing	43	51:18.593	43	22
2	1	17	(Mexico) Mario Domínguez	PacWest Lights	43	+7.002	0	16
3	4	31	(Republic of Ireland) Damien Faulkner	Dorricott Racing	43	?	0	14
4	9	21	(New Zealand) Matt Halliday	Conquest Racing	43	+8.333	0	12
5	6	65	(Mexico) Luis Díaz	Roquin Motorsports	43	+10.658	0	10
Race average speed: 88.959 mph (143.166 km/h)
Lead changes: none
Cautions: 3 for 6 laps

=== Mid-Ohio ===
- August 12, 2001
- Mid-Ohio Sports Car Course, Lexington, Ohio
- Pole position: Townsend Bell, 1:13.809, 110.133 mph (177.242 km/h)

Top Five Finishers
Fin. Pos	St. Pos	Car No.	Driver	Team	Laps	Time	Laps Led	Points
1	1	30	(United States) Townsend Bell	Dorricott Racing	34	50:19.940	34	22
2	2	1	(United Kingdom) Dan Wheldon	PacWest Lights	34	+0.235	0	16
3	3	31	(Republic of Ireland) Damien Faulkner	Dorricott Racing	34	+0.466	0	14
4	4	11	(Denmark) Kristian Kolby	Conquest Racing	34	+1.771	0	12
5	5	21	(New Zealand) Matt Halliday	Conquest Racing	34	+2.148	0	10
Race average speed: 91.518 mph (147.284 km/h)
Lead changes: none
Cautions: 3 for 9 laps

=== Gateway ===
- August 26, 2001
- Gateway International Raceway, Madison, Illinois
- Pole position: Townsend Bell (qualifying rained out; grid determined by championship points)

Top Five Finishers
Fin. Pos	St. Pos	Car No.	Driver	Team	Laps	Time	Laps Led	Points
1	3	1	(United Kingdom) Dan Wheldon	PacWest Lights	80	43:31.081	11	20
2	4	17	(Mexico) Mario Domínguez	PacWest Lights	80	+23.822	0	16
3	8	21	(New Zealand) Matt Halliday	Conquest Racing	80	+624.573	0	14
4	5	16	(Republic of Ireland) Derek Higgins	Mexpro Racing	79	-1 lap	0	12
5	2	31	(Republic of Ireland) Damien Faulkner	Dorricott Racing	79	-1 lap	0	10
Race average speed: 140.080 mph (225.437 km/h)
Lead changes: 1 between 2 drivers
Cautions: 1 for 6 laps

=== Road Atlanta ===
- October 5, 2001
- Road Atlanta, Braselton, Georgia
- Pole position: Townsend Bell, 1:14.883, 122.110 mph (196.517 km/h)

Top Five Finishers
Fin. Pos	St. Pos	Car No.	Driver	Team	Laps	Time	Laps Led	Points
1	6	1	(United Kingdom) Dan Wheldon	PacWest Lights	29	42:57.299	1	20
2	1	30	(United States) Townsend Bell	Dorricott Racing	29	+0.256	28	18
3	3	31	(Republic of Ireland) Damien Faulkner	Dorricott Racing	29	+2.536	0	14
4	5	17	(Mexico) Mario Domínguez	PacWest Lights	29	+4.780	0	12
5	2	32	(United States) Jon Fogarty	Dorricott Racing	29	+5.791	0	10
Race average speed: 102.889 mph (165.584 km/h)
Lead changes: 1 between 2 drivers
Cautions: 1 for 4 laps

=== Laguna Seca ===
- October 14, 2001
- Mazda Raceway Laguna Seca, Monterey, California
- Pole position: Townsend Bell, 1:16.313, 105.576 mph (169.908 km/h)

Top Five Finishers
Fin. Pos	St. Pos	Car No.	Driver	Team	Laps	Time	Laps Led	Points
1	1	30	(United States) Townsend Bell	Dorricott Racing	34	44:34.521	34	22
2	2	32	(United States) Jon Fogarty	Dorricott Racing	34	+2.963	0	16
3	4	65	(Mexico) Luis Díaz	Roquin Motorsports	34	+9.974	0	14
4	6	31	(Republic of Ireland) Damien Faulkner	Dorricott Racing	34	+16.433	0	12
5	5	1	(United Kingdom) Dan Wheldon	PacWest Lights	34	+17.532	0	10
Race average speed: 102.423 mph (164.834 km/h)
Lead changes: none
Cautions: none

=== Fontana ===
- November 4, 2001
- California Speedway, Fontana, California
- Pole position: Townsend Bell (qualifying rained out; grid determined by championship points)
- This was the last CART-sanctioned Indy Lights race.

Top Five Finishers
Fin. Pos	St. Pos	Car No.	Driver	Team	Laps	Time	Laps Led	Points
1	1	30	(United States) Townsend Bell	Dorricott Racing	44	29:22.667	44	21
2	5	1	(United Kingdom) Dan Wheldon	PacWest Lights	44	+0.051	0	16
3	7	11	(New Zealand) Matt Halliday	Conquest Racing	44	+17.354	0	14
4	8	16	(Republic of Ireland) Derek Higgins	Mexpro Racing	44	+17.356	0	12
5	9	17	(Mexico) Mario Domínguez	PacWest Lights	44	+17.361	0	10
Race average speed: 182.334 mph (293.438 km/h)
Lead changes: none
Cautions: 1 for 3 laps

== Championship standings ==
=== Drivers' championship ===
Scoring system

Position	**1st**	**2nd**	**3rd**	**4th**	**5th**	**6th**	**7th**	**8th**	**9th**	**10th**	**11th**	**12th**
Points	20	16	14	12	10	8	6	5	4	3	2	1

- The driver who qualifies on pole is awarded one additional point.
- An additional point is awarded to the driver who leads the most laps in a race.

Pos	Driver	MTY (Mexico)	LGB (United States)	TEX (United States)	MIL (United States)	POR (United States)	KAN (United States)	TOR (Canada)	MOH (United States)	GAT (United States)	ATL (United States)	LAG (United States)	FON (United States)	Points
1	(United States) Townsend Bell	2	1	8	**1***^{1}	**6**	5*	**1***	**1***	**9***^{1}	**2***	**1***	**1***^{1}	192
2	(United Kingdom) Dan Wheldon	5	2*	10	3	10	3	7	2	1	1	5	2	149
3	(Republic of Ireland) Damien Faulkner	7	13	**1***	7	1*	2	3	3	5	3	4	7	141
4	(Mexico) Mario Domínguez	4	**4**	6	2	11	**10**	2	6	2	4	10	5	120
5	(Republic of Ireland) Derek Higgins	**1***	3	2	DNS	3	11	9	12	4	6	6	4	113
6	(New Zealand) Matt Halliday				9	4	4	4	5	3	8	7	3	89
7	(Mexico) Luis Díaz	11	9	4	4	9	7	5	11	6	7	3	6	88
8	(Denmark) Kristian Kolby	6	5	3	6	8	1	10	4					80
9	(Mexico) Rudy Junco Jr.	8	8	7	5	2	9		7	7		9	8	67
10	(Mexico) Rolando Quintanilla	10	11	5	8	5	8	8	9	8	9	8	9	62
11	(United States) Jon Fogarty	3	12	9	10						5	2		48
12	(United States) Cory Witherill	9	7		11	7	6	11	8	10	10	11	10	44
13	(United States) Geoff Boss							6	10					11
14	(New Zealand) Andy Booth		6											8
15	(United States) Larry Mason		10											3
16	(Brazil) Nilton Rossoni	12												1
Pos	Driver	MTY (Mexico)	LGB (United States)	TEX (United States)	MIL (United States)	POR (United States)	KAN (United States)	TOR (Canada)	MOH (United States)	GAT (United States)	ATL (United States)	LAG (United States)	FON (United States)	Points

Color	Result
Gold	Winner
Silver	2nd place
Bronze	3rd place
Green	4th & 5th place
Light Blue	6th–10th place
Dark Blue	Finished (Outside Top 10)
Purple	Did not finish
Red	Did not qualify (DNQ)
Brown	Withdrawn (Wth)
Black	Disqualified (DSQ)
White	Did not start (DNS)
Blank	Did not participate (DNP)
Blank	Not competing

**In-line notation**
**Bold**	Pole position (1 point)
Italics	Ran fastest race lap
*	Led most race laps (1 point)
^{1}	Qualifying cancelled no bonus point awarded

- Ties in points broken by number of wins, or best finishes.

== See also ==
- 2001 CART season
- 2001 Formula Atlantic season
