= Derek Higgins =

Irish former race car driver (born 1964)

Derek Higgins (Irish: Ruaridh Ó hUiginn; born June 12, 1964) is an Irish former race car driver. He was born in Dublin.

== Career ==
Higgins was a two-time winner of the Mexican Formula 3 championship in 1995 and 1997 before moving to the American Indy Lights series in 1998. After two successful seasons where he racked up four wins and finished fifth and seventh in series points, he completed his Indy Racing League rookie test at Walt Disney World Speedway with McCormack Motorsports, expecting to find a ride in the series. However, he was unable sign a deal with a team and returned to Indy Lights for a partial season in 2000 and a complete season in 2001, the series' last. After Indy Lights he competed in a few Toyota Atlantic races in 2002 and has not competed in a notable professional race since. Higgins then became the Assistant Team Manager to Conquest Racing which races in the Indy Racing League. He then moved on to work for Panther Racing. Higgins has also worked as a spotter, notably spotting for driver Townsend Bell in the 2013 Indianapolis 500 and driver Juan Pablo Montoya in the 2014 Indianapolis 500.

== Racing record ==
=== Complete American Open Wheel racing results ===
(key)

==== Indy Lights ====
Year	Team	1	2	3	4	5	6	7	8	9	10	11	12	13	14	Rank	Points	Ref
1998	Quaker State Team Go	HMS; 7	LBH; 21	NAZ; 15	GAT; 6	MIL; 1	DET; 12	POR; 10	CLE; 2	TOR; 17	MIS; 13	TRO; 10	VAN; 2	LAG; 3	FON; 7	5th	94	
1999	Team México Quaker State	HMS; DNS	LBH; 19	NAZ; 11	MIL; 1	POR; 16	CLE; 1	TOR; 12	MIS; 11	DET; 1	CHI; 6	LAG; 19	FON; 15			7th	76	
2000	Dorricott Racing	LBH	MIL	DET	POR	MIS	CHI; 13									18th	12	
2000	Mexpro Racing							MOH; 7	VAN; 7	LAG; 14	GAT	HOU; 14	FON; 17			18th	12	
2001	Mexpro Racing	MTY; 1	LBH; 3	TXS; 2	MIL; DNS	POR; 3	KAN; 11	TOR; 9	MOH; 12	GAT; 4	ATL; 6	LAG; 6	FON; 4			5th	113	

Sporting positions
Preceded by Eddie Irvine	British Formula Ford; Champion; 1988	Succeeded by Bernard Dolan
Preceded by Carlos Guerrero	Mexican Formula Three Champion; 1995	Succeeded by Rod McLeod
Preceded by Rod McLeod	Mexican Formula Three Champion; 1997	Succeeded by Carlos Perea
