= Carlos Guerrero (racing driver) =

Mexican racing driver (born 1957)

Carlos Guerrero (born November 20, 1957, Mexico City, Mexico) is a retired Mexican racing driver. He was a multiple-time Formula Three and Formula Two champion in his native Mexico. Guerrero later raced in the 1995 and 1996 CART seasons with 17 career starts, including the 1995 Indianapolis 500. He was eliminated in a crash on the first lap, becoming one of a handful of drivers to qualify for only one Indianapolis 500 and fail to complete a lap. His best career finish in CART was 11th position at the 1995 Toyota Grand Prix of Long Beach.

Guerrero is not related to fellow racing driver Roberto Guerrero, who is Colombian.

== Racing record ==
=== American Open Wheel ===
(key)

==== CART ====
Year	Team	1	2	3	4	5	6	7	8	9	10	11	12	13	14	15	16	17	Rank	Points	Ref
1995	Dick Simon Racing	MIA	SRF	PHX	LBH; 11	NZR; 14	INDY; 33	MIL; 15	DET; 21	POR; 24	ROA; 19	TOR; 24	CLE; 17	MIS; 26	MDO; 18	NHM; 16	VAN; 15	LS; 18	30th	2	
1996	Dick Simon Racing	MIA; 20	RIO; 20	SRF; 14	LBH	NZR	500	MIL	DET	POR	CLE	TOR	MIS	MDO	ROA	VAN	LS		33rd	0	

Sporting positions
Preceded by None	Mexican Formula Three Champion; 1990	Succeeded by Adrian Fernández
Preceded by Enrique Contreras	Mexican Formula Two Champion; 1991-1992	Succeeded by Allen Berg
Preceded by César Tiberio Jiménez	Mexican Formula Three Champion; 1993-1994	Succeeded by Derek Higgins
