= Fifth Dimension =

Fifth Dimension or fifth dimension may refer to:

- Five-dimensional space, a mathematical concept or construct
- The 5th Dimension, a pop music vocal group debuting in the 1960s
- 5th Dimension (album), a 2013 album by Momoiro Clover Z
- Fifth Dimension (album), a 1966 album by the Byrds
  - "5D (Fifth Dimension)", a 1966 song by the Byrds
- Fifth Dimension, a program in the Radio Tales series for National Public Radio
- The 5th Dimension, the fictional home dimension of DC Comics villain Mister Mxyzptlk
- The 5th Dimension (ride), an amusement park ride

== See also ==
- Dimension 5 (disambiguation)
- 5D (disambiguation)
- Fourth dimension in literature, discusses dimensions 4 and up
