= Dimension 5 (group) =

Dimension 5 is a British Goa trance project. Dimension 5 was one of the first Goa trance groups and released vinyl and CDs. The group started in 1989, and around 1994 they released their first early Goa trance recordings, which they described as "space techno". Back then the group existed of four members: Charlie Clarke, Graham Franklin, Kerry Palmer and Nick Wenham. They started their own label, Intastella Records, in 1996 to have total musical freedom.

This resulted in the making of their first full album, Transdimensional in 1997. The album was in demand but never widely distributed. The project's music was not just released on Intastella Records. Many of their tunes made between 1995 and 1998 were also featured on compilations of other labels (Transient Records, Psychic Deli, Leguan, Phantasm Records, BNE and others).

In 1998, the group got an extra member, Christer Børge Lunde (also known as Ra, Electron Wave and Outzider). This resulted in another album Second Phaze (2000), released by Blue Moon in Thailand. The CD was re-released by the German labels Velvet Inc/Nova Tekk. After this album, Dimension 5 stopped making music.

== Activity ==
=== 1990s: Releases ===
Dimension 5 released several tracks categorized as hardcore, hard trance and trance before they became known for their Goa trance. These were released between 1991 and 1995. In 1996, the group released three 12" Goa trance discs and followed with two more in 1997 along with their first album, Transdimensional. This album is generally regarded as their best work and one of the top Goa trance albums.

Dimension 5 described their music as "space techno psychedelic trance" around the time of their debut album and cited Hawkwind, Gong, Tim Blake and Tangerine Dream as some of their major influences.

=== 2000: Releases ===
The group's second album, Second Phaze, was released in 2000. For this release they were joined by the Norwegian, Christer Børge Lunde. In the same year, Christer and Lars Lind, who was not part of Dimension 5, released their own debut album, To Sirius under the alias Ra. This album contained credited collaboration from Clarke in several tracks and gave special thanks to several other Dimension 5 members. In addition to these two releases, the year 2000 saw Børge Lunde and Clarke release The Uncertainty Principle, under the alias Electron Wave. Wenham and Clarke released Magick Universe under the alias Hunab Ku.

=== 2001: Reissues ===
In 2001, due to popularity and the going under of the Blue Moon Productions UK label, Second Phaze, To Sirius and The Uncertainty Principle were all remastered and re-released on Velvet. Inc, a division of GNT, a sublabel of Nova Tekk Records. Magick Universe remains one of the most rare and sought after Goa trance albums.

=== 2007: Anniversary of Transdimensional ===
To commemorate the tenth anniversary of their debut album, Dimension 5 regrouped to play a gig in Antwerp, Belgium. Due to a resurgence of interest in Goa trance and its popularity and fame, Transdimensional was remastered and reissued by Suntrip Records of Belgium in 2007.

=== Demise ===
Dimension 5 has released no new material since 2000, barring a couple of promotional tracks issued in 2002 by Wenham and Clarke billed as Hunab Ku. Børge Lunde and Lind became active again and released a second album under their alias Ra titled 9th (2008).

== Discography ==
=== Singles and EPs ===
- Utopia EP (Perception Records 1991)
- Utopia - Remixes (Perception Records 1991)
- "Light Sensitive Data" (D5 Records 1995)
- "Trance Express" / "Tracefix" / "Cranial Meltdown" (D5 Records 1995)
- "UFO" / "Light Sensitive Data" (D5 Records 1995)
- "Iron Sun" / "Intastella" (Intastella Records 1995)
- "Iron Sun" (remix) / "Harmonic Convergence" / "Antidote" (Intastella Records 1995)
- "Blue Pyramid" / "Purple Om" (Intastella Records 1996)
- "Psychic Influence" / "Ganymede" (Intastella Records 1996)
- "Deep Space 5D" / "Temple of Chaos" (Intastella Records 1997)
- "Tribes of the Moon" / "Limitless Dimension" (Blue Moon Productions UK 1997)

=== Albums ===
- Transdimensional (Intastella Records 1997)
- Second Phase (Blue Moon Productions UK 2000)
- Second Phase (Velvet Inc. 2001)
- Transdimensional (Remastered) (Suntrip Records 2007)
- TransAddendum (Suntrip Records 2013)
- TransStellar (Suntrip Records 2013)
