= Mexican Formula Three Championship =

- Category: Single-seaters
- Country: Mexico
- Inaugural season: 1990
- Folded: 2002
- Last Drivers' champion: (Mexico) Guillermo Zapata
- Last Makes' champion: Dallara-Volkswagen

Mexican Formula Three Championship is the name of a former Mexican Formula Three racing competition. In 2003 was changed to Mexican Formula Renault.

== Champions ==
| Season | Driver | Car |
|---|---|---|
| 1990 | (Mexico) Carlos Guerrero | Reynard-Alfa Romeo |
| 1991 | (Mexico) Adrián Fernández | Reynard-Volkswagen |
| 1992 | (Mexico) César Tiberio Jiménez | Reynard-Alfa Romeo |
| 1993 | (Mexico) Carlos Guerrero | Reynard-Alfa Romeo |
| 1994 | (Mexico) Carlos Guerrero | Reynard-Alfa Romeo |
| 1995 | (Republic of Ireland) Derek Higgins | Reynard-Alfa Romeo |
| 1996 | (United Kingdom) Rod MacLeod | Reynard-Alfa Romeo |
| 1997 | (Republic of Ireland) Derek Higgins | Reynard-Alfa Romeo |
| 1998 | (Mexico) Carlos Perea | Dallara-Volkswagen |
| 1999 | (Mexico) Eduardo Oliveira | Dallara-Volkswagen |
| 2000 | (Mexico) José Antonio Ramos | Dallara-Volkswagen |
| 2001 | (Mexico) Gilberto Jiménez | Dallara-Volkswagen |
| 2002 | (Mexico) Guillermo Zapata | Dallara-Volkswagen |
