= DV =

DV may refer to:

== Arts and media ==
- D.V., a 1984 autobiography of fashion icon Diana Vreeland
- DV (newspaper), an Icelandic newspaper, formerly Dagblaðið Vísir
- DV, or Diari de Vilanova, a Catalan newspaper
- DV (Digital Video magazine), from NewBay Media

== Law and government ==
- Diversity Immigrant Visa, US lottery program
- Domestic violence
- Dating violence

== Science and technology ==
- DV (video format), digital video format
- Delta-v, change in velocity
- Reference Daily Intake or Daily Value, in nutrition
- DESQview, a DOS multitasking environment
- Distance vector, in network routing
- Distant vision, in eyeglass prescriptions
- Dolby Vision

== Other uses ==
- DV is 505 in Roman numerals
- Dei verbum, a document by the Second Vatican Council
- Deo volente, Latin for 'God willing'
- Maldivian language, and dialects Dhivehi and Mahl (ISO 639-1 alpha-2 code DV)
- Albatros D.V, a German World War I fighter plane
- SCAT Airlines, by IATA airline code
- Dhruv Vikram, Indian actor, singer and lyricist
- William G. Davis Building (DV), University of Toronto Mississauga

== See also ==
- D5 (disambiguation)
- 505 (disambiguation)
- DVS (disambiguation)
- VD (disambiguation)
- D (disambiguation)
- V (disambiguation)
