= 5D =

5D or 5-D may refer to:

== Math, science, and technology ==
- Five-dimensional space
- Canon cameras:
  - Canon EOS 5D
  - Canon EOS 5D Mark II
  - Canon EOS 5D Mark III
  - Canon EOS 5D Mark IV
- Konica Minolta Maxxum 5D, Dynax 5D, or DG-5D, a digital camera
- Little finger, the fifth digit (abbreviated 5D) of the hand

== Arts and media ==
- Yu-Gi-Oh! 5D's, a Japanese anime series
- "5D", a song by Death Grips on their 2011 mixtape Exmilitary
- "5D (Fifth Dimension)", a 1966 song by the Byrds
- 5D (film), an Indian Kannada-language film

== Other uses ==
- Aeroméxico Connect (IATA code D5)

== See also ==
- D5 (disambiguation)
- Fifth Dimension (disambiguation)
