= 1995 Indianapolis 500 =

American motor race

79th Indianapolis 500
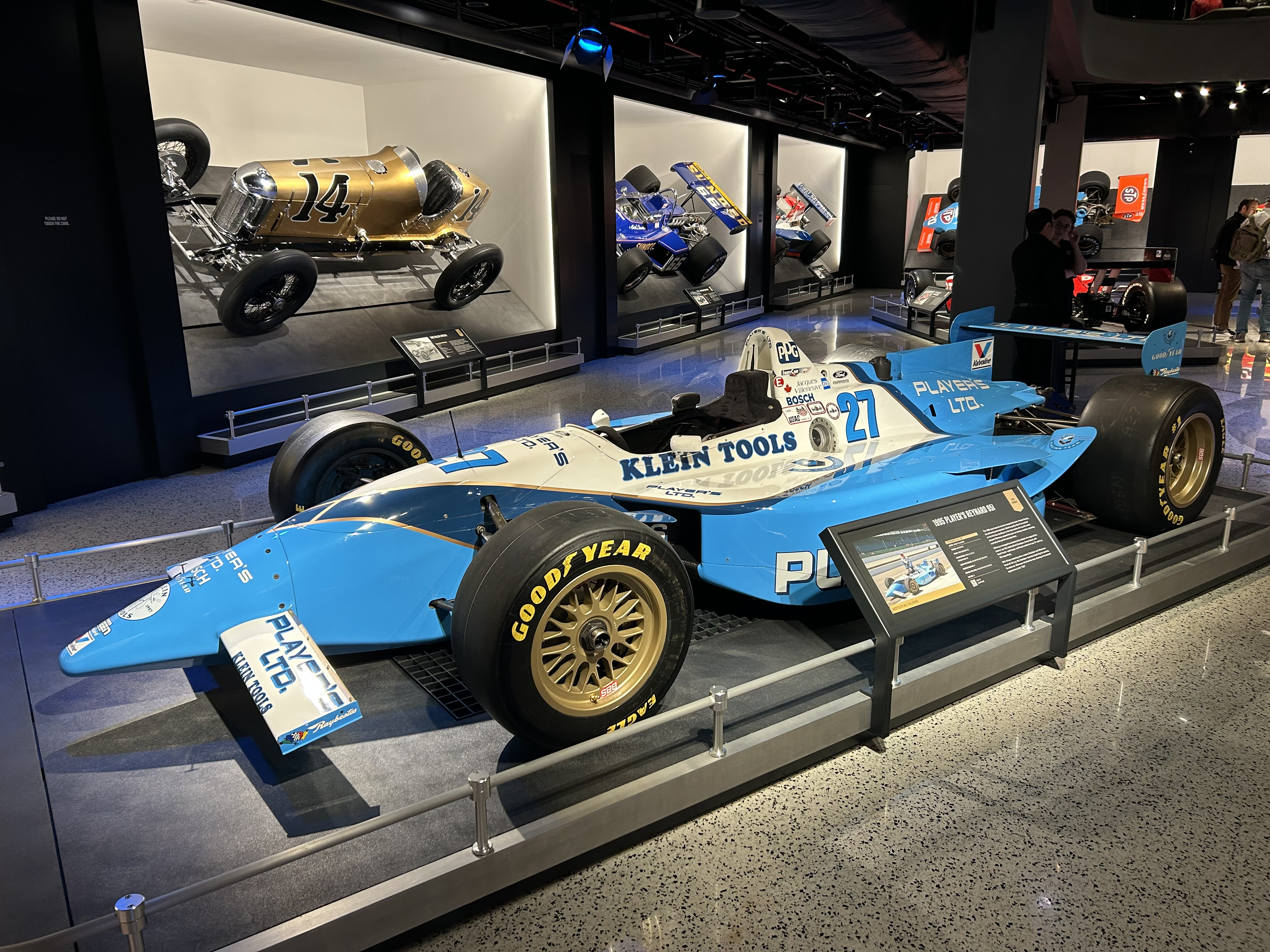

Indianapolis Motor Speedway

Indianapolis 500
- Sanctioning body: USAC
- Season: 1995 CART season
- Date: May 28, 1995
- Winner: (Canada) Jacques Villeneuve
- Winning team: Team Green
- Winning Chief Mechanic: Kyle Moyer
- Time of race: 3:15:17.561
- Average speed: 153.616 mph (247.221 km/h)
- Pole position: (United States) Scott Brayton
- Pole speed: 231.604 mph (372.731 km/h)
- Fastest qualifier: (United States) Scott Brayton
- Rookie of the Year: (Brazil) Christian Fittipaldi
- Most laps led: (Brazil) Maurício Gugelmin (59)

Pre-race ceremonies
- National anthem: Florence Henderson
- "Back Home Again in Indiana": Jim Nabors
- Starting command: Mary F. Hulman
- Pace car: Chevrolet Corvette
- Pace car driver: Jim Perkins
- Starter: Duane Sweeney
- Estimated attendance: 375,000

Television in the United States
- Network: ABC
- Announcers: Host/Lap-by-lap: Paul Page; Color Analyst: Sam Posey; Color Analyst/Turn 2: Bobby Unser
- Nielsen ratings: 9.4 / 26

Chronology
Previous	Next
1994	1996

The 79th Indianapolis 500 was held at the Indianapolis Motor Speedway in Speedway, Indiana on Sunday, May 28, 1995. Sanctioned by USAC, it was part of the 1995 CART PPG Indy Car World Series season. Jacques Villeneuve was victorious in his second start, the first Canadian to win the "500". Villeneuve would go on to win the 1995 CART Championship, before leaving the series to race in Formula One with Williams for 1996.

After dominating the 1994 race and the 1994 season, Marlboro Team Penske failed to qualify for the race. Two-time and defending Indy 500 winner Al Unser Jr. (too slow) and two-time winner Emerson Fittipaldi (bumped) could not get their cars up to speed. A noticeable period of decline followed for the team, including being absent from Indianapolis from 1996 to 2000 due to the forthcoming open wheel "Split". The team returned to their winning ways in 2000 when Gil de Ferran won the CART championship. They then made a victorious return to Indianapolis in 2001.

On lap 190, with the field coming back to green on a restart, race leader Scott Goodyear passed the pace car in turn four, and was assessed a stop-and-go penalty. Goodyear refused to serve the penalty, claiming that the green light was on, and he stayed out on the track. Per the black flag rules, officials ceased scoring Goodyear five laps later (lap 195), which handed Jacques Villeneuve the lead of the race, and ultimately, a controversial victory. Examination of video evidence after the race proved that Goodyear passed the pace car while the yellow caution light was on, and his team declined to protest the ruling. Villeneuve's winning car was powered by the Ford Cosworth XB engine, the powerplant's first Indy victory in its fourth attempt. The win broke a seven-year winning streak by Ilmor-constructed engines. It was the first Cosworth-built engine to win since 1987, and the first Ford-badged engine to win since 1971. With Goodyear's disqualification, Honda was effectively denied their first Indy victory, and did not win at Indianapolis until 2004 with Buddy Rice.

Race winner Jacques Villeneuve's day was not without incident, as he was issued a two-lap penalty for inadvertently passing the pace car during a caution period on lap 38. Through both strategy and luck, the young driver made up the deficit during the course of the race, earning the "Indy 505" sobriquet. (Note: Villeneuve's 2-lap penalty was applied by subtracting 2 laps from his total, rather than by holding him in the pits for a period of time, so he completed 202 laps/505 miles during the race.) In addition to the race controversies, the day was marred by a multi-car crash on the opening lap involving Stan Fox, Eddie Cheever, and others. Fox suffered career-ending head injuries.

The race was held under a growing cloud of uncertainty about the future of the sport of open wheel racing in the United States. Since the early 1980s, the sport had operated in relative harmony, with an arrangement such that CART sanctioned the season-long Indy car national championship, and USAC sanctioned the Indy 500 singly. The Speedway's management, led by Tony George, had already announced the formation of the rival Indy Racing League for 1996, and the Indy 500 was to be its centerpiece. Competitors, fans, and media alike, were apprehensive about the event's future beyond 1995. The 1995 race was the final Indy 500 that featured a field of CART-based drivers and teams.

Due to injuries, retirements, and the open wheel "Split" months later, the race was the final Indy 500 for several drivers, including Bobby Rahal, Danny Sullivan, Teo Fabi, Scott Pruett, Stan Fox, Hiro Matsushita, Stefan Johansson, and others. Emerson Fittipaldi (who failed to qualify) suffered career ending injuries at Michigan in 1996, and never raced at Indy again.

The 1995 month of May celebrated the 50th anniversary of Hulman/George family ownership of the Speedway.

== Race schedule ==
Race schedule – April/May 1995
Sun	Mon	Tue	Wed	Thu	Fri	Sat
23; Nazareth	24	25	26	27	28	29; ROP
30; ROP	1	2	3	4	5	6 Practice
7 Practice	8 Practice	9 Practice	10; Practice	11; Practice	12; Practice	13; Pole Day
14; Time Trials	15; Practice	16; Practice	17; Practice	18; Practice	19; Practice	20; Time Trials
21; Bump Day	22	23	24	25; Carb Day	26	27; Parade
28; Indy 500	29; Memorial Day	30	31			

Color	Notes
Green	Practice
Dark Blue	Time trials
Silver	Race day
Red	Rained out*
Blank	No track activity

* Includes days where track
activity was significantly
limited due to rain

ROP — denotes Rookie
Orientation Program

== Background ==
=== Rule changes ===
Team Penske dominated the 1994 race with the 209-cid Mercedes-Benz 500I purpose-built pushrod engine. Fearing an unfair advantage, and the possibility of escalating costs, both USAC and CART separately evaluated the situation. Two weeks after the 1994 race, USAC announced that for 1995, the 209 cid purpose-built pushrod engines were allowed 52 inHG of "boost" (down from 55 inHG). The traditional "stock block" production-based engines (e.g., Buick and Menard) were still allowed 55 inHG. Meanwhile, the mainstay overhead cam 2.65L V-8 engines stayed at 45 inHG.

During the summer of 1994, Tony George announced his plans to start the Indy Racing League in 1996, with an emphasis on cost-saving measures. On August 11, 1994, USAC changed its decision, and scaled back the boost for the purpose-built pushrod engines further to 48 inches; and outlawing it outright for 1996. The move was considered by Roger Penske as "politically motivated", and ultimately set back the Penske Team going into 1995.

Marlboro Team Penske won 12 (of 16) races in 1994, including five 1-2-3 finishes, and swept the top 3 in the final 1994 CART championship points standings. As the 1995 season started, Penske drivers Al Unser Jr. and Emerson Fittipaldi each won a race prior to Indy with their 2.65L Mercedes-branded engine (a rebranded version of the Ilmor engine). Despite the outward appearance that the team was still at the top of their game entering Indianapolis, insiders at the team were growing apprehensive, and were concerned that they were ill-prepared. A private test yielded poor results related to the chassis handling, and it was becoming increasingly apparent that the team had lost considerable ground after losing the use of the Mercedes-Benz 500I. A test in mid-April yielded speeds of 228 mph (367 km/h), which would have been enough to make the race, though not put either car on the front row.

Other changes for 1995 included an updated Honda V-8 engine, and the heralded return of Firestone tires, which had last competed in 1974. Firestone arrived at the Speedway with two tire compounds, a hard and soft option. Most teams used the soft option for qualifying, and switched to the hard compound on race day. Goodyear started the month with only one compound, but introduced a soft option tire four days before the race.

=== Team and driver changes ===
Rahal-Hogan Racing dropped the Honda program, and instead, Tasman Motorsports became the prominent team involved. Honda introduced a new engine for the 1995 race, the aluminum alloy block HRH V-8, replacing the older iron block HRX V-8. After a one-year sabbatical (spending time in broadcasting and in NASCAR), Danny Sullivan returned to Indy for PacWest Racing. Michael Andretti, after one year at Ganassi, returned to his familiar spot at Newman/Haas, alongside Paul Tracy, who moved over to that team from Penske.

A re-booted Patrick Racing arrived at Indy with driver Scott Pruett. During the previous year, the team had served as a non-competing factory test outfit for Firestone.

Davy Jones announced plans to attempt "Double Duty". He qualified at Indy, but ultimately failed to make the field at Charlotte.

== Practice – week 1 ==
=== Saturday May 6 ===
Opening day saw the Menard cars of Arie Luyendyk (233.281 mph) and Scott Brayton (232.408 mph) lead the speed chart for the day.

=== Sunday May 7 ===
Menard cars once again were the top 2, with Luyendyk (232.715 mph) best of the day. Penske drivers Emerson Fittipaldi and defending Indy 500 winner Al Unser Jr. took their first practice laps of the month, but neither were among the top ten.

=== Monday May 8 ===
Arie Luyendyk posted the fastest practice lap in Indy history, 234.107 mph. With Scott Brayton second, Paul Tracy also was over 230 mph.

=== Tuesday May 9 ===
Scott Brayton finally bumped Luyendyk off the top spot, with a lap of 231.410 mph for the day. Teo Fabi (230.716 mph) became the fourth driver over 230 mph for the month.

=== Wednesday 10 ===
Rain delayed the start of practice until shortly after 1:30 p.m. Arie Luyendyk again led the speed charts at 232.468 mph.

At 3:31 p.m., Davey Hamilton crashed in turn four, suffering a broken ankle. The brief practice session was ended around 4 p.m. due to rain.

=== Thursday May 11 ===
Arie Luyendyk upped the fastest practice lap in Indy history to 234.322 mph. Scott Brayton later bettered the time with a lap of 234.656 mph. Eight drivers were over 230 mph for the day.

=== Friday, May 12 ===
At 5:12 p.m., Jacques Villeneuve went high in turn 2 and crashed into the outside wall. The car was heavily damaged, but Villeneuve was not seriously injured.

Arie Luyendyk set yet another unofficial track record, with a practice lap of 234.913 mph. The top nine drivers were all over 231 mph.

== Time trials – weekend 1 ==
=== Pole day – Saturday May 13 ===
Rain delayed the start of time trials until late in the afternoon. At 4:45 p.m., pole day qualifying began. Arie Luyendyk in a Menard entry, took the provisional pole at 231.031 mph. A tight schedule saw several cars take runs, including Eddie Cheever (226.314 mph) and Paul Tracy (225.795 mph)

At 5:16 p.m., Scott Brayton, also driving for Menard, secured the pole position with a run of 231.604 mph. Before the close of the day, Michael Andretti (229.294 mph) tentatively squeezed his way onto the front row.

When the 6 o'clock gun sounded, 11 cars were in the field, and several drivers were still in the qualifying line. Pole day qualifying would be extended into the next day.

=== Pole Day conclusion & Second day – Sunday May 14 ===
A windy but warm day was observed for the second day of time trials. Pole qualifying continued from the previous day. Several cars qualified, with Jacques Villeneuve leading the early cars at 228.397 mph.

At 1:07 p.m., Scott Goodyear (230.759 mph) qualified his Honda-powered machine for the third starting position, bumping Michael Andretti to the second row. At 1:12 p.m., the original pole day qualifying order was exhausted, and Scott Brayton was officially awarded the pole position. Among the cars who had not qualified included Rahal-Hogan drivers Bobby Rahal & Raul Boesel. Neither Penske entry (Emerson Fittipaldi & Al Unser Jr.) made an attempt in the pole round.

Second day qualifying started at just before 1:30 p.m. Among the quicker runs were Hideshi Matsuda, Bobby Rahal and Raul Boesel. Buddy Lazier joined the two previous Menard entries and put a third team car in the field. At the close of the second day of time trials, the field was filled to 25 cars (8 vacant). After continuing problems getting up to speed, neither Penske entry attempted to qualify all weekend.

== Practice – week 2 ==
=== Monday May 15 ===
Team Menard cars took their first day off since the Speedway opened for the month. Paul Tracy (228.339 mph) led the speed chart for the day. The fastest non-qualified car was Éric Bachelart at 227.261 mph.

At Team Penske, Emerson Fittipaldi wheeled out a year-old Penske chassis and practiced for 59 laps, with a top lap of 220.745 mph.

=== Tuesday May 16 ===
Rain kept the track closed until 2:11 p.m. Team Penske borrowed a Reynard chassis from Roberto Guerrero's team, and Al Unser Jr. took his first laps in the car. In 44 laps, Unser posted a top lap of 218.050 mph.

At 4:45 p.m., Bryan Herta spun and crashed hard in turn 2. The car became slightly airborne, and Herta momentarily lost consciousness. Herta was diagnosed with a minor concussion, and was sidelined for several days.

Teo Fabi (226.998 mph) posted the fastest lap of the day.

=== Wednesday May 17 ===
Rain closed the track for the day.

Off the track, Rahal-Hogan Racing announced that they would supply Marlboro Team Penske with back-up Lola chassis, in a goodwill effort to help Penske's drivers get up to speed. A year earlier, Penske had loaned chassis to Rahal's team, when they were struggling to qualify the 1994 Honda-powered machines.

=== Thursday May 18 ===
Driving the newly acquired Lola, Emerson Fittipaldi was quickly up to 223.775 mph. Al Unser Jr., however, remained in the Penske chassis, and was mired back at only 218.510 mph.

The practice session was brief, as rain kept the track closed until 2 p.m. Green flag conditions only lasted 53 minutes, and the track closed for rain at 3:21 p.m.

=== Friday May 19 ===
The final full day of practice saw heavy action. Adrian Fernandez (228.397 mph) led the speed chart for the non-qualified cars. The attention of the afternoon was focused again on Team Penske, as they were making their final efforts to get their cars up to speed.

Emerson Fittipaldi driving the Rahal back-up car, quickly began to find speed, and within 10 minutes, was over 226 mph. At 11:26 a.m., Fittipaldi turned a lap of 227.814 mph, his fastest lap of the month, and the fastest lap by that car all month.

Al Unser Jr., however, was still trying to salvage speed out of the Penske car. After several inconsistent times throughout the day, his best lap of 219.085 mph was completed with five minutes left in the session. That night, Rahal offered a second chassis to Penske for Unser Jr. to drive.

== Time trials – weekend 2 ==
=== Third Day – Saturday May 20 ===
At 5 p.m., Al Unser Jr. made his first attempt to qualify in a Rahal back-up car. Unser had practiced just minutes earlier at over 227 mph. After two laps in the 224 mph range, the run was waved off.

Scott Sharp, in a Foyt backup also waved off his first attempt. At 5:14 p.m., Emerson Fittipaldi made his first attempt in a Rahal backup car. His third lap was up to 226.097 mph, but the crew waved off the run. The move angered Fittipaldi, and proved unwise, as the speed would have been fast enough to qualify.

Most cars failed to complete their attempts, as conditions were unfavorable for speeds. Al Unser Jr. returned to the track for his second attempt at 5:46 p.m. This run, however, slower, and even more inconsistent, and the team waved it off as well.

Franck Fréon completed a slow run of 224.432 mph, and tentatively placed himself as slowest in the field. Scott Sharp made one last attempt as time expired, but the crew again waved off the run.

The day ended with the field filled to 30 cars. Both Penske cars, along with Sharp, were still not qualified.

=== Bump Day – Sunday May 21 ===
With only three positions remaining, bump day began with both Penske drivers struggling to get their cars up to speed. At noon, Carlos Guerrero completed a run of 225.831 mph, and filled the field to 31 cars. Davy Jones waved off a run, and the early qualifiers were through.

Over the next four hours, the Penske team practiced, in a futile search for speed. Fittipaldi completed one lap at 228.017 mph, while Unser Jr. managed only 222.206 all afternoon.

At 5:07 p.m., qualifying resumed. Scott Sharp completed a run of 225.711 mph, slightly faster than his waved off run a day before. With only one position open, Emerson Fittipaldi took to the track. It was his second attempt to qualify. His four-lap run of 224.907 mph put him 32nd-fastest, and filled the field to 33 cars. Minutes later, Davy Jones completed a run of 225.135 mph, and bumped out Franck Fréon. The move put Fittipaldi on the bubble.

After surviving two attempts, Fittipaldi still clung to the 33rd starting position at 5:30 p.m. His teammate Al Unser Jr. then took to the track in his third and final attempt. He faced the grim possibility of missing the field, or bumping out his teammate to make the field. Unser's first lap of 221.992 mph drastically pulled down his average, and his speed was too slow to bump out Fittipaldi.

Fittipaldi survived three more attempts, and with 12 minutes left in the day, Stefan Johansson took to the track. Johansson's speed of 225.547 mph bumped out Fittipaldi. The Penske team had three cars left in the qualifying line, but none had a realistic chance of bumping their way in, or even making it to the front of the line. As the 6 o'clock gun sounded, Fittipaldi and Unser Jr., the winners of the previous three Indy 500s, were out of time, and had failed to qualify. It was the first time since 1968 that Penske Racing had failed to qualify a single car in the Indianapolis 500.

Post-race Roger Penske quoted, "I've got to take the responsibility for not getting into the race, but a lot of my fellow team owners came up to me and offered me help and I want to thank them for that from the bottom of my heart. We are not going to buy our way into this race. We had an opportunity to compete on a level playing field and we did not get the job done."

== Carburetion Day ==
During the week, Chip Ganassi Racing announced that Bryan Herta would be switching to a back-up car on race day. The car was moved to the back of the field, and Herta was cleared to drive in time for Carbueration Day. In addition, Team Penske withdrew Emerson Fittipaldi as the driver of the #9T, forfeiting his status as the first alternate. The car went back to Rahal-Hogan Racing, with no driver listed.

The final practice session was held Thursday May 25. Rain delayed the start of the session until 12:27 p.m. All 33 qualified cars turned laps along with the first and second alternate. Scott Goodyear (228.392 mph) the fastest of the day. Carlos Guerrero suffered from a smoking turbocharger, while both Alessandro Zampedri and Raul Boesel stalled out on the track out of fuel. Bobby Rahal took laps in his primary car and the #56 back-up car, which was the first alternate (the #9T car with which Emerson Fittipaldi was bumped from the field) and Frank Freon (second alternate) took 23 laps.

The top two race qualifiers, polesitter Scott Brayton and his Menard teammate Arie Luyendyk were noticeably off the pace. Car owner John Menard accused USAC of providing them with defective or malfunctioning pop-off valves. The team reported they were not achieving the allotted 55 inHG, permitted for the V-6 stock block engines. USAC denied the allegations. Many years later, the boost discrepancy was attributed to an alleged rules infraction during time trials, and subsequent technical penalty.

Davy Jones was absent, as he was at Charlotte attempting (unsuccessfully) to qualify for the Coca-Cola 600. Eliseo Salazar shook down the #77 machine that belonged to Jones.

=== Pit Stop Contest ===
The elimination rounds for the 19th annual Miller Genuine Draft Pit Stop Contest were held on Thursday May 25. The top three race qualifiers and their respective pit crews were automatically eligible: Scott Brayton, Arie Luyendyk, and Scott Goodyear. However, Goodyear's crew declined the invitation. Michael Andretti (who qualified 4th) took that empty spot. Two additional quarterfinal spots would be filled by preliminaries scheduled for May 17–18, for a total of five participants.

Rain delayed the preliminaries until Friday May 19. The results were as follows: Jacques Villeneuve (11.762 seconds), Adrián Fernández (12.723 seconds), Raul Boesel (12.971 seconds), Teo Fabi (14.325 seconds), Bobby Rahal (stalled engine), Eric Bachelart (stalled engine). Villeneuve and Fernández advanced to the quarterfinal bracket.

Jacques Villeneuve defeated Adrián Fernández to advance the semifinal bracket. Villeneuve then beat race pole-sitter Scott Brayton in the semifinals. Michael Andretti won the other semifinal match over Arie Luyendyk. Andretti was issued a 3-second penalty due to having a crew member out of the pit box. However, Luyendyk's car was disqualified when he stalled the engine and failed to leave his pit box. Both Team Menard entries were defeated in the semifinals.

In the final round matchup, Jacques Villeneuve, led by chief mechanic Kyle Moyer faced Michael Andretti, led by chief mechanic Tim Bumps. In the closest finish in the history of the event, Villeneuve and Andretti raced to a tie (13.982 seconds). Officials elected to re-run the final in order to break the tie. In the tiebreaker match, Villeneuve edged out Andretti by a mere 0.104 seconds to win the event for the second year in a row.

Quarterfinals
27	Jacques Villeneuve (Team Green)	13.490
10	Adrián Fernández (Galles Racing)	15.220

Semifinals
27	Jacques Villeneuve (Team Green)	13.676
60	Scott Brayton (Team Menard)	16.946
6	Michael Andretti (Newman/Haas)	19.984
40	Arie Luyendyk (Team Menard)	stalled

Finals
27	Jacques Villeneuve (Team Green)	13.982	14.556
6	Michael Andretti (Newman/Haas)	13.982	14.660

== Starting grid ==
Row	Inside		Middle		Outside	
1	60	(United States) Scott Brayton; Quaker State; Team Menard; Lola T9500, Menard V-6; 231.604 mph (372.731 km/h)	40	(Netherlands) Arie Luyendyk W Glidden; Team Menard; Lola T9500, Menard V-6; 231.031 mph (371.808 km/h)	24	(Canada) Scott Goodyear; Tasman Motorsports; Tasman Motorsports; Reynard 95I, Honda; 230.759 mph (371.371 km/h)
2	6	(United States) Michael Andretti; Kmart/Texaco Havoline; Newman/Haas Racing; Lola T9500, Ford-Cosworth XB; 229.294 mph (369.013 km/h)	27	(Canada) Jacques Villeneuve; Player's Ltd. Team Green; Reynard 95I, Ford-Cosworth XB; 228.397 mph (367.569 km/h)	18	(Brazil) Maurício Gugelmin; Hollywood/PacWest; PacWest Racing; Reynard 95I, Ford-Cosworth XB; 227.923 mph (366.807 km/h)
3	5	(United States) Robby Gordon; Valvoline/Cummins; Walker Racing; Reynard 95I, Ford-Cosworth XB; 227.531 mph (366.176 km/h)	20	(United States) Scott Pruett; Firestone/Patrick Racing; Patrick Racing; Lola T9500, Ford-Cosworth XB; 227.403 mph (365.970 km/h)	12	(United States) Jimmy Vasser; Target/STP; Chip Ganassi Racing; Reynard 95I, Ford-Cosworth XB; 227.350 mph (365.884 km/h)
4	25	(Japan) Hiro Matsushita; Panasonic/Duskin/Arciero; Arciero-Wells Racing; Reynard 95I, Ford-Cosworth XB; 226.867 mph (365.107 km/h)	91	(United States) Stan Fox; Delta Faucet/Bowling; Hemelgarn Racing; Reynard 95I, Ford-Cosworth XB; 226.588 mph (364.658 km/h)	31	(Brazil) André Ribeiro R LCI; Tasman Motorsports; Reynard 95I, Honda; 226.495 mph (364.508 km/h)
5	21	(Colombia) Roberto Guerrero; Upper Deck/Gen Comp; Pagan Racing; Reynard 94I, Mercedes Benz; 226.402 mph (364.359 km/h)	14	(United States) Eddie Cheever; A. J. Foyt Copenhagen; A. J. Foyt Enterprises; Lola T9500, Ford-Cosworth XB; 226.314 mph (364.217 km/h)	33	(Italy) Teo Fabi; Combustion Engineering/Indeck; Forsythe Racing; Reynard 95I, Ford-Cosworth XB; 225.911 mph (363.569 km/h)
6	3	(Canada) Paul Tracy; K-Mart/Budweiser; Newman/Haas Racing; Lola T95000, Ford-Cosworth XB; 225.795 mph (363.382 km/h)	34	(Italy) Alessandro Zampedri R The MI-JACK Car; Payton/Coyne; Lola T9400, Ford-Cosworth XB; 225.753 mph (363.314 km/h)	17	(United States) Danny Sullivan W VISA/PacWest; PacWest Racing; Reynard 95I, Ford-Cosworth XB; 225.496 mph (362.901 km/h)
7	8	(Brazil) Gil de Ferran R Pennzoil; Hall/VDS Racing; Reynard 95I, Mercedes Benz; 225.437 mph (362.806 km/h)	54	(Japan) Hideshi Matsuda; Zunne Group; Beck Motorsports; Lola T9400, Ford-Cosworth XB; 227.818 mph (366.638 km/h)	9	(United States) Bobby Rahal W Miller Genuine Draft; Rahal/Hogan; Lola T9500, Mercedes Benz; 227.081 mph (365.451 km/h)
8	11	(Brazil) Raul Boesel; Duracell Charger; Rahal/Hogan; Lola T9500, Mercedes Benz; 226.028 mph (363.757 km/h)	80	(United States) Buddy Lazier; Quaker State; Team Menard; Lola T9500, Menard V-6; 226.017 mph (363.739 km/h)	7	(Chile) Eliseo Salazar R Cristal/Mobil 1/Copec; Dick Simon Racing; Lola T9500, Ford-Cosworth XB; 225.023 mph (362.139 km/h)
9	10	(Mexico) Adrian Fernández; Tecate Beer/Quaker State; Galles Racing; Lola T9500, Mercedes Benz; 227.803 mph (366.613 km/h)	19	(Belgium) Éric Bachelart; The AGFA Car; Payton/Coyne; Lola T9400, Ford-Cosworth XB; 226.875 mph (365.120 km/h)	15	(Brazil) Christian Fittipaldi R Marlboro/Chapeco; Walker Racing; Reynard 95I, Ford-Cosworth XB; 226.375 mph (364.315 km/h)
10	90	(United States) Lyn St. James; Whitlock Auto Supply; Dick Simon Racing; Lola T9500, Ford-Cosworth XB; 225.346 mph (362.659 km/h)	22	Carlos Guerrero R Herdez-Viva Mexico! Dick Simon Racing; Lola T9500, Ford-Cosworth XB; 225.831 mph (363.440 km/h)	41	(United States) Scott Sharp; Copenhagen Racing Team; A. J. Foyt Enterprises; Lola T9500, Ford-Cosworth XB; 225.711 mph (363.247 km/h)
11	16	(Sweden) Stefan Johansson; Team Alumax; Bettenhausen Racing; Reynard 95I, Mercedes-Benz; 225.547 mph (362.983 km/h)	77	(United States) Davy Jones; Byrd's/Bryant Heating; Dick Simon Racing; Lola T9500, Ford-Cosworth XB; 225.135 mph (362.320 km/h)	4	(United States) Bryan Herta; Target/Scotch Video; Chip Ganassi Racing; Reynard 95I, Ford-Cosworth XB; 225.551 mph (362.989 km/h)

- Note: Bryan Herta crashed his already-qualified primary car during practice. He started the race in a back-up car; the car was moved to the 33rd starting position on race day.

=== Alternates ===
- First alternate: Emerson Fittipaldi (#9T) – Bumped; Fittipaldi was not listed as the first alternate driver. On race day, Fittipaldi would announce the race for Brazilian television network Sistema Brasileiro de Televisao alongside Teo José and Dede Gomez.
- Second alternate: Franck Fréon (#92) – Bumped

=== Failed to qualify ===
Driver	#	Chassis	Engine	Tire	Entrant	Qual Speed
(Brazil) Emerson Fittipaldi W	2	Penske PC-24	Mercedes Benz	G	Penske Racing	Did not attempt
(Brazil) Emerson Fittipaldi W	89	Penske PC-23	Mercedes Benz	G	Penske Racing	Did not attempt
(Brazil) Emerson Fittipaldi W	9T	Lola T9500	Mercedes Benz	G	Rahal/Hogan Racing	224.907
(France) Franck Fréon R	92	Lola T9200	Menard V-6	F	Autosport Racing Team	224.432
(United States) Al Unser Jr. W	1	Penske PC-24	Mercedes Benz	G	Penske Racing	Did not attempt
(United States) Al Unser Jr. W	11T	Lola T9500	Mercedes Benz	G	Rahal/Hogan Racing	224.101
(United States) Al Unser Jr. W	21T	Reynard 94I	Mercedes Benz	G	Pagan Racing	Did not attempt
(Brazil) Marco Greco	55	Lola T9500	Mercedes Benz	G	Galles Racing	Waved off
(Brazil) Marco Greco	10T	Lola T9500	Mercedes Benz	G	Galles Racing	Waved off
(United States) Davey Hamilton R	95	Reynard 94I	Ford-Cosworth XB	F	Hemelgarn Racing	Wrecked in practice
(United States) Davey Hamilton R	95T	Reynard 94I	Ford Cosworth XB	F	Hemelgarn Racing	Waved off
(United States) Jeff Ward R	44	Lola T9400	Ford-Cosworth XB	F	Arizona Motorsports	Waved off
(United States) Johnny Parsons Jr.	64	Reynard 94I	Ford-Cosworth XB	G	Project Indy	Waved off
(United Kingdom) Jim Crawford	96	Lola T9200	Buick V-6	F	Hemelgarn Racing	Did not attempt
(United States) Michael Greenfield R	42	Lola T9300	Greenfield V-8	F	Greenfield Racing	Wrecked in practice
(United States) Mike Groff	4T	Reynard 95I	Ford-Cosworth XB	G	Chip Ganassi Racing	Waved off
(United States) Dean Hall	90T	Lola T9200	Buick V-6	G	Dick Simon Racing	Did not attempt
(United States) Dean Hall	99T	Lola T9400	Ford-Cosworth XB	G	Dick Simon Racing	Waved off
(Finland) Tero Palmroth	90T	Lola T9200	Buick V-6	G	Dick Simon Racing	Did not attempt

W Former Indianapolis 500 winner

R Indianapolis 500 Rookie

== Race summary ==
=== Start and Stan Fox accident ===
Rain fell the night before the race, and moisture continued throughout the early morning hours. The rain stopped, however, and the track was dried. The start of the race was delayed by only about five minutes.

At the start, Scott Goodyear swept into the lead from the outside of the front row. Seconds later, Stan Fox dipped low to the inside, hit the rumble strips, became loose and spun a half turn. The car shot directly into the outside wall in turn one. The car was demolished, the nose was ripped off, and Fox's legs and body were exposed as the car crashed up into the catch fence. Eddie Cheever, Lyn St. James, and Carlos Guerrero were caught up in the accident. Gil de Ferran ran over a piece of debris, breaking the front suspension. He limped back to the pits, but dropped out when it was determined the damage was too much to repair. A long caution was needed for cleanup, and Fox was critically injured with a closed head injury due to g-forces. Despite his exposed extremities, however, he suffered no major injuries to his arms or legs. Fox was transported to Methodist Hospital, and after several months, he recovered, but would never race again.

On lap 10, the race finally got restarted. Arie Luyendyk got the jump on the green flag, and took the lead.

=== Jacques Villeneuve penalty ===
On lap 37, Arie Luyendyk was trying to get by the car of Scott Sharp. Luyendyk felt that Sharp was blocking him, and as they went into turn 1, Luyendyk gave him the finger. In the process, he knocked off his helmet headrest cushion. It flew out of the cockpit and landed on the racing surface. It brought out the yellow flag for debris. The yellow came out during a sequence of green-flag pit stops, the field was hectically shuffling in and out of the pit area.

By rule, the pits were immediately closed at the onset of yellow, and Jacques Villeneuve became scored as the leader on lap 38. A few cars, including Villeneuve, Scott Pruett and others, had not made their scheduled pit stop yet, and were getting precariously close to running out of fuel. Villeneuve was not aware he was actually leading the pack. The pace car came out to pick up the field, and by rule, was supposed to get directly in front of Villeneuve as the leader. But Villeneuve went by the pace car twice, not knowing they were trying to pick him up. Finally, the officials sorted out the field, the pit area was opened, and Villeneuve immediately went to the pits for service. He suffered a slow stop with several errors. He nearly pulled away with the fuel hose attached, then subsequently stalled as he pulled away.

A few minutes after the race went back to green, USAC assessed Jacques Villeneuve a two-lap penalty for passing the pace car twice as they were trying to pick him up. The penalty dropped him from 3rd place to 24th. The two laps were effectively deleted from his scoring serial.

=== Remainder of the first half ===
Michael Andretti led 45 laps in the first half but on lap 77, he was abruptly knocked out of the race. Maurício Gugelmin was leading in turn four, and Andretti was behind him in second place. Andretti caught him in turn four, as Gugelmin was slowing down to make a pit stop. Andretti tried to go around him on the outside, but got up into the "marbles" and brushed the wall exiting turn four, damaging the suspension. He veered across the track to enter the pits, to have the crew look over the car. The rear wishbone suspension was bent, and Andretti climbed out of the car, out of the race.

As Andretti was climbing from his car, Scott Sharp spun and wrecked in turn four.

By the time the field went back to green on lap 84, Jacques Villeneuve had made up one of his laps. He was running 20th, one lap down.

=== Second half ===
On lap 124, Andre Ribeiro stalled on the track with an electrical problem. By that time, Jacques Villeneuve had gotten his second lap back, and was now on the lead lap in 12th place. Villeneuve caught another break when Paul Tracy slowed on the backstretch with electrical problems, bringing out another caution.

Maurício Gugelmin led the most laps (59) but did not manage to lead again after lap 138. The leaders were now Jimmy Vasser, Scott Pruett, and Scott Goodyear. Jacques Villeneuve was now up to 6th place. After Vasser pitted while leading on lap 157, Villeneuve retook the lead for the first time since his penalty.

On lap 162, Davy Jones crashed in turn 2 as Villeneuve was preparing to pit. The race restarted on lap 169. Vasser led following pit stops by most of the drivers during the caution. A lap later, Scott Pruett passed him going down the backstretch for the lead. Vasser got high and hit the outside wall in the north chute, leading Vasser to give Pruett a hand gesture under the caution. Pruett held point until shortly after the restart on lap 176 when Goodyear passed him.

By this stage of the race, the winds began to gust over 30 mph. On lap 184, with Goodyear still in front by almost a second, Pruett got high in turn 2 and bounced off the outside wall. Pruett's car spun across the backstretch, got airborne and backed into the catchfence, demolishing the rear end.

=== Scott Goodyear penalty and finish ===
With eleven laps to go, Scott Goodyear led Jacques Villeneuve, Eliseo Salazar and Christian Fittipaldi under caution. The field prepared to go back to green on lap 190. Down the backstretch, Goodyear held back a little bit and allowed the pace car to clear ahead. United States Auto Club (USAC) official Don Bailey was driving the Corvette pace car, which was entering turn four. At the entrance of turn three, Goodyear and Villeneuve both accelerated, leaving a trail of tire marks behind. Villeneuve was right on his tail. Entering turn four, Goodyear continued to accelerate, but Villeneuve suddenly backed off to avoid passing the pace car. The two cars had caught up to the pace car in the middle of turn four, and it had not yet entered the pits. Scott Goodyear did not lift, blew by the pace car and proceeded to race down the front stretch. The rest of the field checked up and a gaggle of six cars nearly collided to avoid the pace car as it pulled into the pits.

USAC flagman Duane Sweeney put out the green flag, with Goodyear now well ahead of the rest of the cars. Villeneuve emerged from the melee still in second, and the rest of the field diced down the front stretch and funneled into turn one without incident.

A few moments later, USAC race control announced that Scott Goodyear was being assessed a stop-and-go penalty for passing the pace car on the restart. Goodyear was in disbelief on his radio, insisting that he did not do anything wrong. He claimed that the green light was on, and many felt the pace car was going too slow. The black flag was waved at Goodyear but he kept racing and chose not to acknowledge it. Team owner Steve Horne told Goodyear to keep going to the end believing they could protest the penalty after the race. Per the black flag rules, Goodyear had a window of five laps to serve the penalty before disqualification.

Since he failed to heed the penalty, USAC ceased scoring Goodyear after lap 195. Therefore, when Jacques Villeneuve came around to complete lap 196, he was scored officially in the lead, with Christian Fittipaldi second and Bobby Rahal now third. Villeneuve led the rest of the way to win the race. On the last lap, Arie Luyendyk passed Villeneuve at the stripe to un-lap himself, and finished 7th on the lead lap. With his lap total stopped at 195 for ignoring the penalty, Goodyear sank through the standings to 15th place, five laps down.

Pole-sitter Scott Brayton's day ended ten laps down in 17th place. His car was down on turbocharger boost, and after the race he quipped that he was so slow he felt he "was in the way." Years later, it would be revealed that Brayton (and his teammate Arie Luyendyk), were secretly being penalized by USAC for illegally over-boosting their turbocharger plenums and tampering with the pop-off valves during practice and qualifying.

Scott Goodyear was visibly upset in an interview as he said to reporters: "Disbelief is the best word to describe how I feel. I feel like I won this race. The pace car was going too slow. ... I almost hit it. Scott Pruett almost hit it, Villeneuve almost hit it. He wasn't on the gas and I saw the green lights turn on and that meant go. That's all I can say. I stayed out because in my eyes it was perfect ... and if I came in and later found I didn't make a mistake then what are you going to do? It would have been too late and you won't get it back."

=== Aftermath and legacy ===
The finish was highly controversial, with Scott Goodyear passing the pace car emerging as the story of the race. Goodyear claimed that he saw the green light on when he blew by the pace car, and the team threatened to protest. Video footage, however, was found that showed the yellow light was still on when it happened.

In addition, scoring transponders in the pace car and the race cars showed the following:

- At the end of the backstretch, the pace car, turning its lights off, was clocked at 77 mph. Goodyear was slightly slower at 68 mph.
- At the entry of turn three, where the pace car had been clocked at 83 mph, Goodyear and Villeneuve flew by at 117 mph and 118 mph respectively.
- Through the north chute, Goodyear increased his speed to about 166 mph. The pace car was in the middle of turn 4.
- By the exit of turn four, Goodyear blew by the pace car going about 193 mph. The pace car was speeding up from about 98 mph to over 117 mph as it entered the pits. Villeneuve, anticipating the situation, quickly slowed back down to about 142 mph.

After video and timing and scoring evidence came out that was not supportive of Goodyear's case, the team (Tasman Motorsports) decided not to file a protest. Goodyear stated that he stayed out (and did not serve the stop-and-go penalty) because if he was in the right, and stayed out, he could still be scored as the winner. If he came in, he would have lost the theoretical lead, and would have had no chance of claiming victory. In such case, he most likely would have finished 7th, the last car on the lead lap (except for Luyendyk, who un-lapped himself on the final lap).

Largely overlooked was Bobby Rahal's charge from 21st starting position to 3rd – the second year in a row he greatly improved on his starting position (in 1994, he started 28th and finished 3rd). It was also the first time in an odd year that Rahal finished the race. From 1982 to 1994, Rahal had a notable "odd-even/good-bad" streak at Indy. In even years, he had good finishes, and in odd years, his results were poor. Rahal's result was also accomplished in spite of a pit lane speeding penalty assessed during the race, a penalty that Rahal disputed in his post race television interview, as his car's on board speedometer had said that he was traveling 91 mph, safely under the 100 mph speed limit; Rahal called the penalty 'balderdash'. This would end up being his final Indy 500 as a driver. He returned to Indy seven years later as an owner in 2002.

Arie Luyendyk's pass of Jacques Villeneuve at the start-finish line was noteworthy as it allowed him to complete the full 500 miles. He became the second and final driver to complete the full 500 miles in a Buick/Menard-powered car. Luyendyk's 7th-place finish was the third-highest all-time for the Buick/Menard V6, surpassed only by the 3rd place of Al Unser Sr. in 1992, and the 6th place by Jim Crawford in 1988.

Jacques Villeneuve went on to win the 1995 CART championship, and subsequently left the series to join Formula One with Williams the next year. With a growing cloud of controversy and uncertainty over a potential and looming open wheel "split", the 1995 Indianapolis 500 marked a turning point in the sport. Within months, and by the 1996 race, the landscape and organizational harmony of Indy car racing would change drastically. Villeneuve was the first, and as of 2024, is still the only Canadian to win the Indy 500.

Al Unser Jr., who notably failed to qualify, would like others, not be able to return to the 500 for several years, due mostly to the upcoming open wheel "split". The devastating result helped exacerbate an existing downward spiral that was involving his personal life. Unser Jr. returned to the Speedway for the first time in August of 1998, and competed in the inaugural IROC at Indy, finishing a close second to Mark Martin. He attended a practice session for the 1999 Indy 500, and was warmly welcomed by fans. For 2000, he switched full-time to the IRL, and finally got a chance to avenge his 1995 failure.

== Box score ==
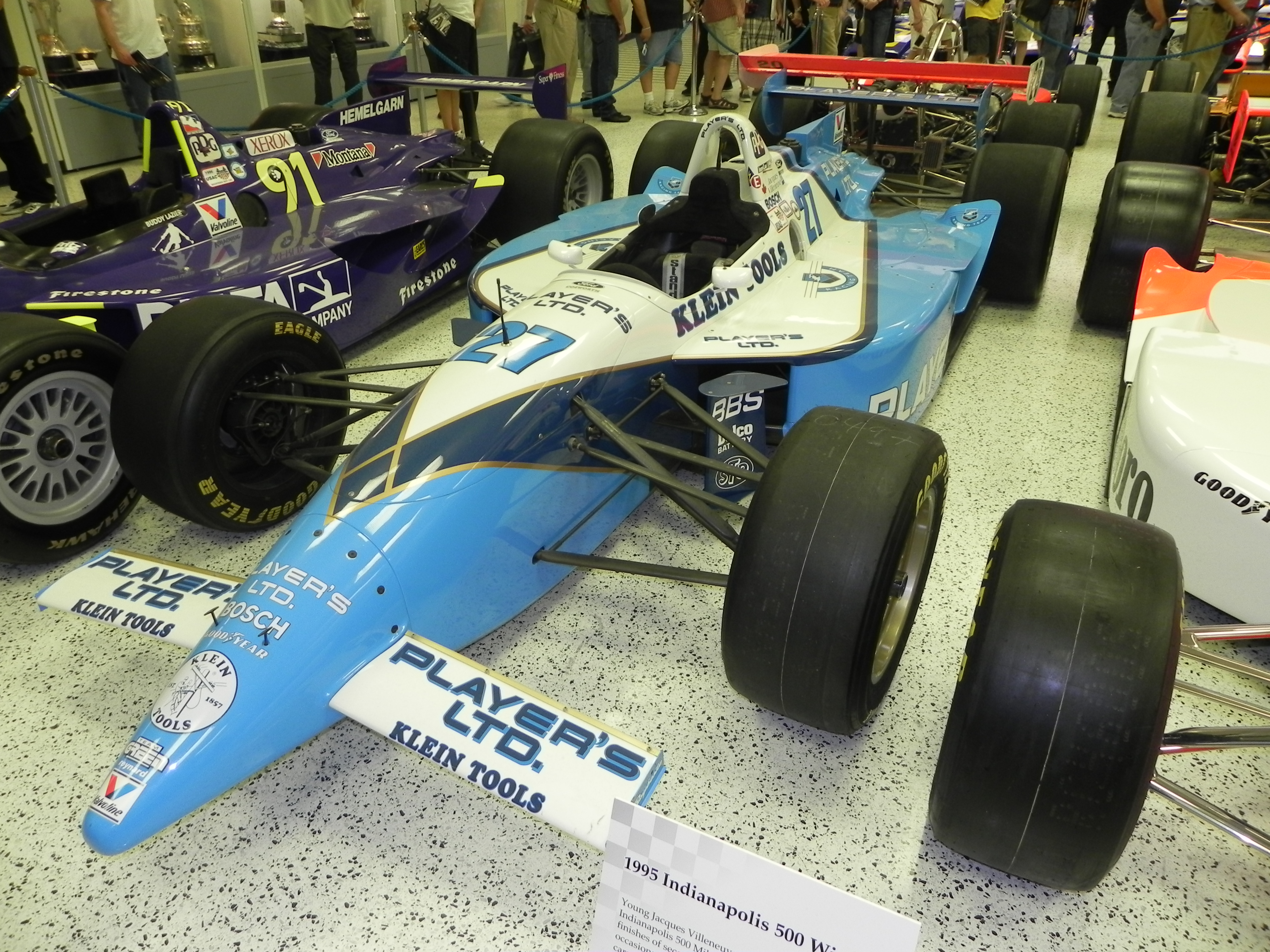

Finish	Start	No	Driver	Entrant	Chassis	Engine	Tire	Laps	Status	Points
1	5	27	(Canada) Jacques Villeneuve	Team Green	Reynard 95I	Ford-Cosworth XB	G	200	153.616 mph	20
2	27	15	(Brazil) Christian Fittipaldi R	Walker Racing	Reynard 95I	Ford-Cosworth XB	G	200	+2.481	16
3	21	9	(United States) Bobby Rahal W	Rahal/Hogan Racing	Lola T95/00	Mercedes-Benz Ilmor D	G	200	+2.966	14
4	24	7	(Chile) Eliseo Salazar R	Dick Simon Racing	Lola T95/00	Ford-Cosworth XB	G	200	+4.768	12
5	7	5	(United States) Robby Gordon	Walker Racing	Reynard 95I	Ford-Cosworth XB	G	200	+14.905	10
6	6	18	(Brazil) Maurício Gugelmin	PacWest Racing	Reynard 95I	Ford-Cosworth XB	G	200	+17.077	9
7	2	40	(Netherlands) Arie Luyendyk W	Team Menard	Lola T95/00	Menard V-6	G	200	+41.959	6
8	15	33	(Italy) Teo Fabi	Forsythe Racing	Reynard 95I	Ford-Cosworth XB	G	199	-1 Lap	5
9	18	17	(United States) Danny Sullivan W	PacWest Racing	Reynard 95I	Ford-Cosworth XB	G	199	-1 Lap	4
10	10	25	(Japan) Hiro Matsushita	Arciero/Wells Racing	Reynard 95I	Ford-Cosworth XB	F	199	-1 Lap	3
11	17	34	(Italy) Alessandro Zampedri R	Payton/Coyne Racing	Lola T94/00	Ford-Cosworth XB	F	198	-2 Laps	2
12	13	21	(Colombia) Roberto Guerrero	Pagan Racing	Reynard 94I	Mercedes-Benz Ilmor D	G	198	-2 Laps	1
13	33	4	(United States) Bryan Herta	Chip Ganassi Racing	Reynard 95I	Ford-Cosworth XB	G	198	-2 Laps	
14	3	24	(Canada) Scott Goodyear	Tasman Motorsports	Reynard 95I	Honda HRH	F	195	Black flag†	
15	20	54	(Japan) Hideshi Matsuda	Beck Motorsports	Lola T94/00	Ford-Cosworth XB	F	194	-6 Laps	
16	31	16	(Sweden) Stefan Johansson	Bettenhausen Racing	Reynard 94I	Ford-Cosworth XB	G	192	-8 Laps	
17	1	60	(United States) Scott Brayton	Team Menard	Lola T95/00	Menard V-6	G	190	-10 Laps	1
18	12	31	(Brazil) André Ribeiro R	Tasman Motorsports	Reynard 95I	Honda HRH	F	187	-13 Laps	
19	8	20	(United States) Scott Pruett	Patrick Racing	Lola T95/00	Ford-Cosworth XB	F	184	Accident T2	
20	22	11	(Brazil) Raul Boesel	Rahal/Hogan Racing	Lola T95/00	Mercedes-Benz Ilmor D	G	184	Oil Line	
21	25	10	(Mexico) Adrian Fernández	Galles Racing	Lola T95/00	Mercedes-Benz Ilmor D	G	176	Engine	
22	9	12	(United States) Jimmy Vasser	Chip Ganassi Racing	Reynard 95I	Ford-Cosworth XB	G	170	Accident T3	
23	32	77	(United States) Davy Jones	Dick Simon Racing	Lola T95/00	Ford-Cosworth XB	G	161	Accident T2	
24	16	3	(Canada) Paul Tracy	Newman/Haas Racing	Lola T95/00	Ford-Cosworth XB	G	136	Electrical	
25	4	6	(United States) Michael Andretti	Newman/Haas Racing	Lola T95/00	Ford-Cosworth XB	G	77	Suspension	
26	30	41	(United States) Scott Sharp	A. J. Foyt Enterprises	Lola T95/00	Ford-Cosworth XB	G	74	Accident T4	
27	23	80	(United States) Buddy Lazier	Team Menard	Lola T95/00	Menard V-6	G	45	Fuel System	
28	26	19	(Belgium) Éric Bachelart	Payton/Coyne Racing	Lola T94/00	Ford-Cosworth XB	F	6	Mechanical	
29	19	8	(Brazil) Gil de Ferran R	Jim Hall Racing	Reynard 95I	Mercedes-Benz Ilmor D	G	1	Accident T1	
30	11	91	(United States) Stan Fox	Hemelgarn Racing	Reynard 95I	Ford-Cosworth XB	F	0	Accident T1	
31	14	14	(United States) Eddie Cheever	A. J. Foyt Enterprises	Lola T95/00	Ford-Cosworth XB	G	0	Accident T1	
32	28	90	(United States) Lyn St. James	Dick Simon Racing	Lola T95/00	Ford-Cosworth XB	G	0	Accident T1	
33	29	22	(Mexico) Carlos Guerrero R	Dick Simon Racing	Lola T95/00	Ford-Cosworth XB	G	0	Accident T1	

W Former Indianapolis 500 winner

R Indianapolis 500 Rookie

† Scott Goodyear was given the black flag on lap 191, but he did not serve the stop-and-go penalty. By rule, after five laps officials ceased scoring his car, and he was credited with 195 laps.

=== Race statistics ===
Lap Leaders
Laps	Leader
1–9	Scott Goodyear
10–16	Arie Luyendyk
17–32	Michael Andretti
33–35	Scott Goodyear
36–38	Jacques Villeneuve
39–66	Michael Andretti
67	Scott Goodyear
68–76	Maurício Gugelmin
77	Michael Andretti
78–81	Scott Goodyear
82–116	Maurício Gugelmin
117–120	Scott Goodyear
121	Bobby Rahal
122–123	Raul Boesel
124–138	Maurício Gugelmin
139	Scott Goodyear
140–155	Jimmy Vasser
156–162	Jacques Villeneuve
163–165	Scott Pruett
166	Robby Gordon
167–170	Jimmy Vasser
171–175	Scott Pruett
176–195	Scott Goodyear
196–200	Jacques Villeneuve

Total laps led
Driver	Laps
Maurício Gugelmin	59
Michael Andretti	45
Scott Goodyear	42
Jimmy Vasser	20
Jacques Villeneuve	15
Scott Pruett	8
Arie Luyendyk	7
Raul Boesel	2
Bobby Rahal	1
Robby Gordon	1

Cautions: 9 for 58 laps
Laps	Reason
1–9	Fox, Cheever, St. James, Guerrero, de Ferran crash in turn 1
37–44	Debris in turn 1
80–86	Scott Sharp crash in turn 4
89–95	Stefan Johansson spin in turn 4
123–126	André Ribeiro tow-in
138–141	Paul Tracy tow-in
163–169	Davy Jones crash in turn 4
171–176	Jimmy Vasser crash in turn 3
185–190	Scott Pruett crash in turn 2

Tire participation chart
Supplier	No. of starters
Goodyear	25 *
Firestone	8
* – Denotes race winner

== CART Points standings after the race ==
Rank	Driver	Points	Difference	Position Change
1	Jacques Villeneuve	67	Leader	+ 1
2	Bobby Rahal	52	15	+ 1
3	Scott Pruett	51	20	2
4	Mauricio Gugelmin	47	20	1
5	Robby Gordon	43	24	+ 2

- Note: Only the top five positions are included for the standings.

== 1994–95 USAC Gold Crown Championship ==
1994–95 USAC Championship Car season
- USAC Gold Crown Championship

Season
- Races: 1

Awards
- National champion: (Canada) Jacques Villeneuve

The 1994–95 USAC Gold Crown Championship season consisted of one sanctioned race. The schedule was based on a split-calendar, beginning in June 1994 and running through May 1995. Starting in 1981, USAC scaled back their participation in top-level Indy car racing, and ultimately ceased sanctioning races outside of the Indianapolis 500 following their 1983–84 season. Subsequently, the Gold Crown Championship would consist of only one event annually; the winner of the Indianapolis 500 would be the de facto Gold Crown champion, as it was their lone points-paying event. The preeminent national championship season was instead sanctioned by CART, and the Indy 500 paid championship points separately (on a different scale) toward the CART championship as well.

Jacques Villeneuve, by virtue of winning the 1995 Indianapolis 500, also won the 1994–95 USAC Championship. This would be the final Gold Crown title awarded. USAC would sanction the newly created Indy Racing League championship in 1996.

=== Final points standings (Top five) ===
Pos	Driver	INDY (United States)	Pts
1	(Canada) Jacques Villeneuve	1	1000
2	(Brazil) Christian Fittipaldi	2	800
3	(United States) Bobby Rahal	3	700
4	(Chile) Eliseo Salazar	4	600
5	(United States) Robby Gordon	5	500

== Broadcasting ==
=== Radio ===
The race was carried live on the IMS Radio Network. Bob Jenkins served as chief announcer for the sixth year. Johnny Rutherford served as "driver expert". Brian Hammons and Chris McClure departed, which shuffled the assignments slightly. Newcomer Ken Double took the turn two location, and Mike King debuted as a pit reporter. Gary Lee shifted to the pits, and Chris Economaki joined the booth to offer commentary and observations during the pre-race, near the halfway point, and in the post-race.

This would be the final 500 on the broadcast for Bob Forbes, Larry Henry, and Sally Larvick. Forbes died in 2005, and Henry died in 2025. Both Henry and Larvick would instead work the U.S. 500 in 1996.

Indianapolis Motor Speedway Radio Network
Booth Announcers	Turn Reporters	Pit/garage reporters
Chief Announcer: Bob Jenkins; Driver expert: Johnny Rutherford; Statistician: Howdy Bell; Historian: Donald Davidson; Commentary: Chris Economaki	Turn 1: Jerry Baker; Turn 2: Ken Double R Turn 3: Larry Henry; Turn 4: Bob Lamey	Bob Forbes (north pits); Gary Lee (north-center pits); Sally Larvick (south-center pits); Mike King R (south pits); Chuck Marlowe (garages)

=== Television ===
The race was carried live flag-to-flag coverage in the United States on ABC Sports. Paul Page served as host and play-by-play announcer. Bobby Unser (turn 2) and Sam Posey (booth) served as color commentators. Danny Sullivan left the broadcast and returned to the cockpit for the 1995 race.

For the first time since 1970, as well as the first time since going to a live broadcast, the telecast was billed as a presentation of ABC's Wide World of Sports.

With the exception of Sullivan, the on-air crew remained the same for the sixth straight year (from 1990 to 1995). This would be the final 500 for Sam Posey. He would leave ABC after the IndyCar season to join Speedvision for their Formula One coverage. After failing to qualify for the race, Emerson Fittipaldi served as an analyst for the race coverage on Brazilian television SBT.

ABC Television
Booth Announcers	Pit/garage reporters
Host/Announcer: Paul Page; Color: Sam Posey; Color/Turn 2: Bobby Unser	Jack Arute; Gary Gerould; Dr. Jerry Punch

== Gallery ==
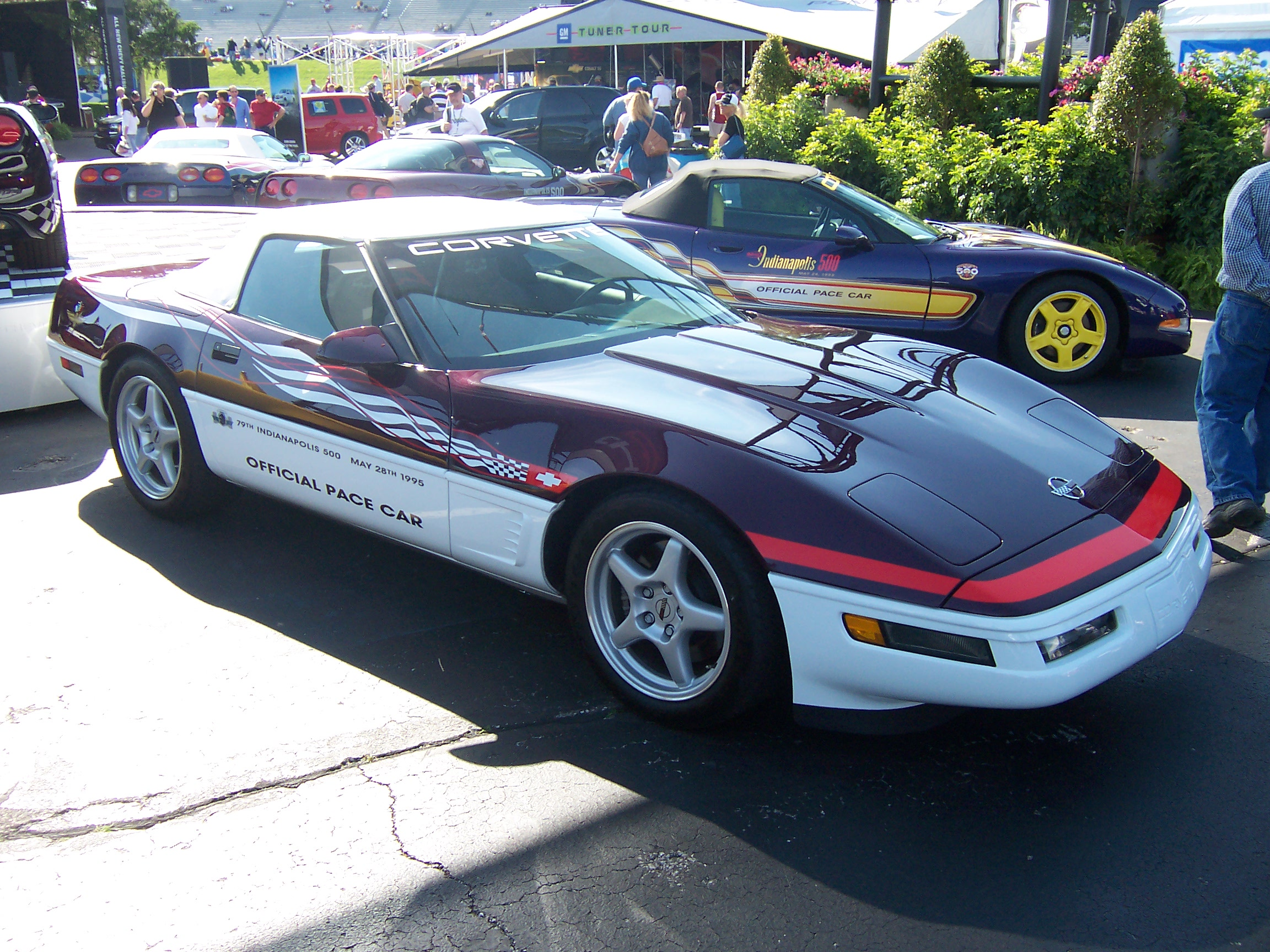
1995 Chevrolet Corvette pace car

== See also ==
- 1995 Indianapolis 500 Radio Broadcast, Indianapolis Motor Speedway Radio Network

== Notes ==
=== Works cited ===
- 1995 Indianapolis 500 Day-By-Day Trackside Report for the Media
- Indianapolis 500 History: Race & All-Time Stats – Official Site
- Month of Mayhem

== Bibliography ==
- Bair, Dawn M., ed. (1995). Indy Review, Volume 5: 79th Indianapolis 500. Osceola, WI: Indy 500 Publications / Indianapolis Motor Speedway Corporation. ISBN 978-1-880526-04-0.

1994 Indianapolis 500; Al Unser Jr.	1995 Indianapolis 500; Jacques Villeneuve	1996 Indianapolis 500; Buddy Lazier
