= Dauair =

German regional airline

DauAir

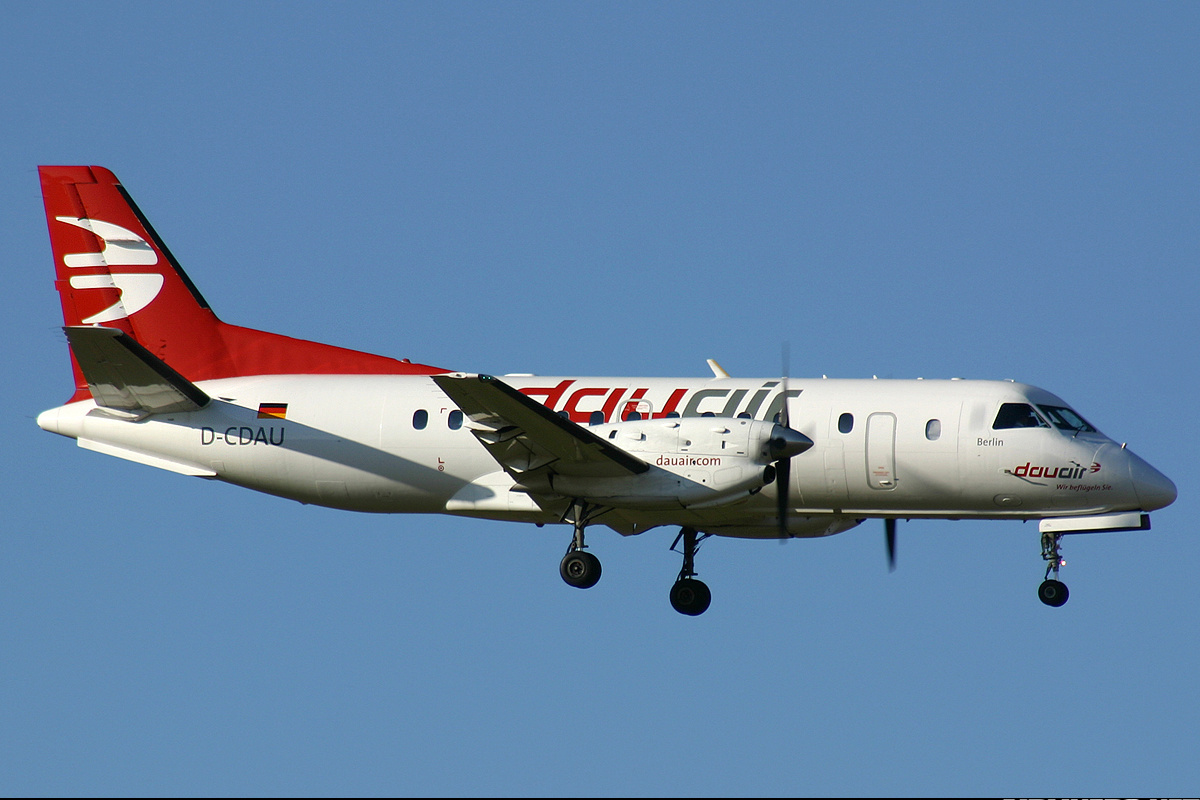
- Saab 340B
IATA	ICAO	Call sign
D5	DAU	DAUAIR
- Founded: 2005
- Commenced operations: April 18, 2005
- Ceased operations: August 16, 2006
- Operating bases: Dortmund Airport
- Headquarters: Lübeck, Germany
- Website: dauair.com

Dauair was a low-cost regional airline based in Lübeck, Germany. It operated domestic and international services. Its main base was Dortmund Airport.

== History ==
Founded in 2005, the airline began scheduled flights in April to some domestic destinations and in the neighboring countries. The operations were not met with success, and following the withdrawal of its licence by Germany's Federal Office of Aviation on August 9, 2006 the company invoked an insolvency procedure with the Lübeck district court on August 16, 2006 and stopped flying.

== Destinations ==
Dauair served the following scheduled destinations:

- Austria — Innsbruck, Salzburg, Vienna
- Germany — Dortmund, Hanover, Nuremberg, Munich
- Poland — Poznan, Warsaw
- Switzerland — Zurich, Geneva, Basel
- United Kingdom — Fairford

== Fleet ==
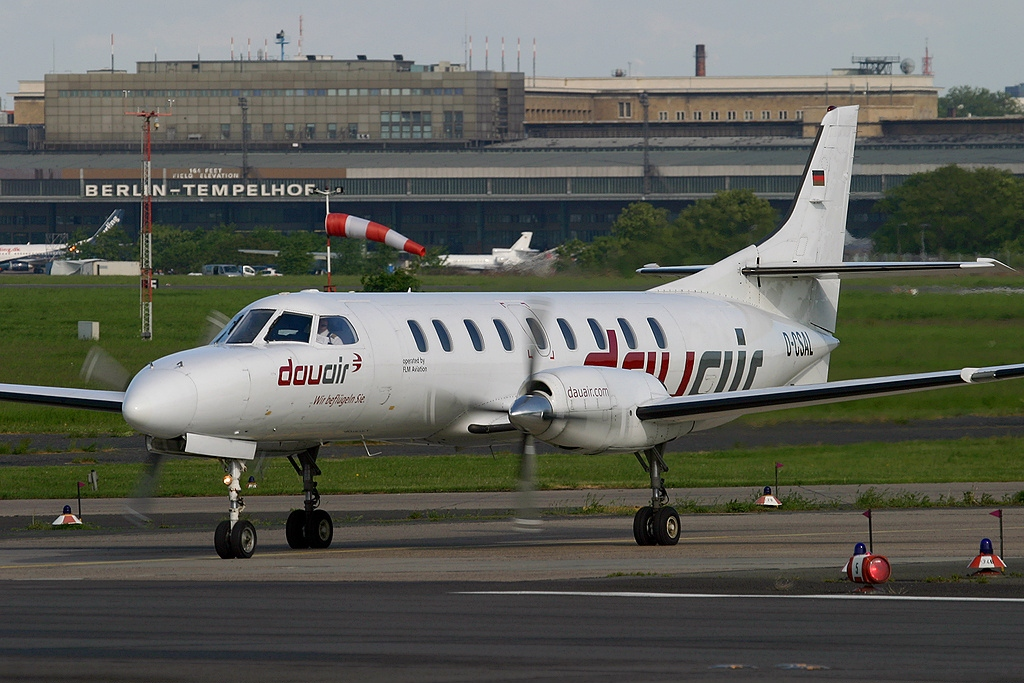
Fairchild Metro III

As of August 2006 the dauair fleet included the following aircraft:

- 3 x Saab 340 (taken over from Carpatair)
- 1 x Fairchild Metro III
