= Dynamic vapor sorption =

Gravimetric technique

Dynamic vapor sorption (DVS) is a gravimetric technique that measures how quickly and how much of a solvent is absorbed by a sample such as a dry powder absorbing water. It does this by varying the vapor concentration surrounding the sample and measuring the change in mass which this produces. The technique is mostly used for water vapor, but is suitable for a wide range of organic solvents. Daryl Williams, founder of Surface Measurement Systems Ltd, developed Dynamic Vapor Sorption in 1991; the first instrument was delivered to Pfizer UK in 1992. DVS was originally developed to replace the time and labor-intensive desiccators and saturated salt solutions used to measure water vapor sorption isotherms.

== Water sorption isotherms ==
The main application of DVS is to measure water sorption isotherms. In general, a vapor sorption isotherm shows the equilibrium amount of vapor sorbed as a function of steady state relative vapor pressure at a constant temperature. For water sorption isotherms, water-relative vapor pressure is more commonly expressed as relative humidity. This is accomplished in a DVS measurement by exposing a sample to a series of step changes in relative humidity and monitoring the mass change as a function of time. The sample mass must be allowed to reach gravimetric equilibrium at each step change in humidity before progressing to the next humidity level. Then, the equilibrium mass values at each relative humidity step are used to generate the isotherm. Isotherms are typically divided into two components: sorption for increasing humidity steps, and desorption for decreasing humidity steps. Sorption can be further divided into adsorption (sorbate located on the surface) and absorption (sorbate penetrates the bulk).

== Typical results ==
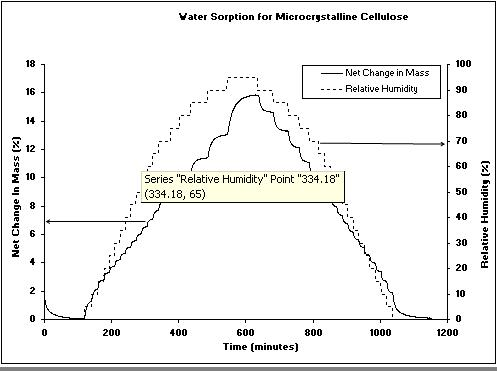
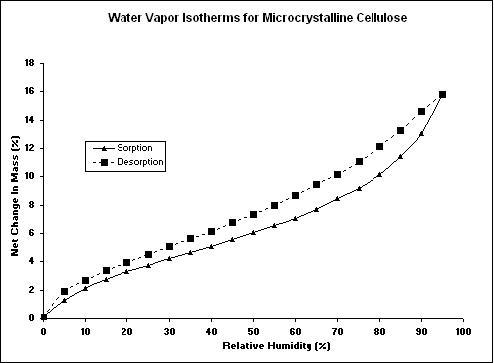
Figure 1. Water vapor sorption kinetic (a.) and isotherm (b.) plot for microcrystalline cellulose at 25.0 °C.

Figure 1 shows a typical water sorption result from a DVS measurement for a microcrystalline cellulose sample. The kinetic data (Figure 1a) shows the change in mass and humidity as a function of time. From the kinetic results, the rate of water uptake and water diffusion coefficients can be determined. The equilibrium mass values at the end of each humidity step were used to calculate the sorption and desorption isotherms (Figure 1b). The difference in water vapor uptake between the sorption and desorption isotherms is called the hysteresis. The shape and location of the isotherm hysteresis can elucidate information about the sorption mechanism and sample porosity. Although an isotherm experiment is the most common use of a DVS instrument, humidity- or other vapor-ramping experiments can be performed to investigate vapor-induced phase changes. These changes include: glassy to rubbery transitions, amorphous to crystalline conversions, and sample deliquescence.

== Applications ==
DVS measurement has applications over a wide range of industries. Both equilibrium vapor sorption isotherms and vapor sorption kinetic results can yield vital information for materials ranging from pharmaceuticals to fuel cells. Although water sorption experiments are most common, the use of organic vapor in DVS experiments can reveal additional sample properties. The below sections highlight how DVS experiments are utilized in several industries.

=== Pharmaceuticals ===
The moisture sorption properties of pharmaceutical materials such as excipients, drug formulations and packaging films are recognized as critical factors in determining their storage, stability, processing and application performance. Further, vapor sorption experiments can be used to study hydrate and solvate formation. Gravimetric vapor sorption experiments are one of the most sensitive methods for determining amorphous contents, which may have a detrimental impact on the stability, manufacturability and dissolution characteristics of the formulated drug product.

=== Food science ===
The moisture sorption properties of food products are recognized as critical factors in determining their storage, stability, processing and application performance. DVS is also used to measure moisture and flavor diffusion properties for packaging and barrier applications. Further, moisture sorption plays critical roles in the storage and performance of agricultural products like pesticides, herbicides, fertilizers, and seeds.

=== Personal care products ===
DVS experiments have been widely used in the study of personal care materials. For instance, the moisturization of hair samples with different chemical (i.e. conditioning, coloring, and bleaching) and mechanical (i.e. perming, combing, and blow-drying) treatments. The hydration behavior of skin samples has also been studied by DVS. Other moisture sorption applications related to the personal care industry include the dehydration of contact lenses and superabsorbent polymers.

=== Building materials ===
In particular to building materials, moisture sorption has significant implications for cements, woods, insulation materials, and fibers. Moisture damage is a significant factor limiting a building's lifespan. As well, moisture infusion through a building's outer structure can have a significant effect on indoor air quality and air-conditioning load.

=== Proton exchange membranes ===
A critical parameter affecting the performance of proton exchange membranes is the water content. Water is typically supplied to the fuel cell by humidifying the gas feed stream. The level of hydration within the proton exchange membrane is vital to its performance: if the hydration level is too low, the polymers exhibit greatly reduced ionic conductivity; if hydration level is too high, excess water can flood the pores in the gas diffusion layer and impede mass transport within the electrode structure. For these reasons, DVS has been used to study the water sorption and transport properties of proton exchange membranes.

== See also ==
- Hygroscopy
- Moisture sorption isotherm
- Water content
