= Suntrip Records =

Suntrip Records VOF
- Company type: Vennootschap onder firma
- Industry: Music & entertainment
- Founded: 2004
- Headquarters: Maarkedal, Belgium
- Key people: Joske Vranken and Chris Roquet.
- Products: Music & entertainment
- Website: www.suntriprecords.com

Suntrip Records is a Belgian record label, releasing all forms of Goa trance, acid trance and melodic psychedelic trance. Suntrip Records was set up in the summer of 2004 by Fabien "Mars" Marsaud, one of the founders of the Psynews.org website and Joske "Anoebis" Vranken, a famous Belgian DJ and party-organiser.

In 2002, the first ideas for founding a melodic Goa trance label arose. It would offer an alternative to modern Full on psychedelic trance, a music style that branched off Goa trance. The idea was to release new Goa trance music similar to its style in 1995–1998, but with modern production.

== Timeline ==
The Suntrip Association was officially created under French law on 17 July 2004, its office situated in Malakoff, France, and its board comprised four people. The first album to be released on Suntrip Records was Sky Input by Swedish composer Filteria in November 2004.

On 16 October 2007, Suntrip became a Belgian company as a Vennootschap onder firma. Its office used to be situated in Gentbrugge and moved to Maarkedal in 2018.

In 2017, Chris Roquet, joined this core team to take care of the bookings' activity, 604 bookings.

In 2019, Suntrip Records started the sublabel Classic Goa Trax with the help of Kobi Harosh. This label focuses on digital rereleases of 90s music.

In 2022, Fabien Marsaud left the label and sold his shares of the company to Chris Roquet.

In 2025 Suntrip Records started the sublabel Ooze Tale. A sublabel, focusing on melodic forest and other experimental forms of melodic psychedelic trance.

== Releases ==
The label became the leading Goa trance label in the world with over 80 CD-releases and over 10 LPs and EPs by 2025. Their releases include world known artists such as Filteria, Astral Projection, Mindsphere, Battle of the Future Budddhas and many more.

On their sublabel Classic Goa Trax, over 100 full albums of the '90s were digitally rereleased and several physical vinyl Eps were released in collaboration with Flatlife Records.

Suntrip releases mostly melodic & acidic Goa trance, but their music became more varied over the years. They occasionally offer music close to the Dark genres as well as Ambient music.

== Other information ==
Suntrip Records is the organiser of Apsara Festival. Three editions of this festivals happened so far. One in Romania in 2018 and two in Hungary in 2023 and 2025

Suntrip Records is hosting a stage on Surya Spirits festival in Gent and they organise the final day on Biennially festival ZNA gathering in Portugal

In January 2024 Joske Anoebis was diagnosed with leukemia.

== See also ==
- List of record labels
