= 505 =

Calendar year

505 in various calendars
- Gregorian calendar: 505; DV
- Ab urbe condita: 1258
- Assyrian calendar: 5255
- Balinese saka calendar: 426–427
- Bengali calendar: −89 – −88
- Berber calendar: 1455
- Buddhist calendar: 1049
- Burmese calendar: −133
- Byzantine calendar: 6013–6014
- Chinese calendar: 甲申年 (Wood Monkey); 3202 or 2995 — to — 乙酉年 (Wood Rooster); 3203 or 2996
- Coptic calendar: 221–222
- Discordian calendar: 1671
- Ethiopian calendar: 497–498
- Hebrew calendar: 4265–4266
- Hindu calendars
- Vikram Samvat: 561–562
- Shaka Samvat: 426–427
- Kali Yuga: 3605–3606
- Holocene calendar: 10505
- Iranian calendar: 117 BP – 116 BP
- Islamic calendar: 121 BH – 120 BH
- Javanese calendar: 391–392
- Julian calendar: 505; DV
- Korean calendar: 2838
- Minguo calendar: 1407 before ROC 民前1407年
- Nanakshahi calendar: −963
- Seleucid era: 816/817 AG
- Thai solar calendar: 1047–1048
- Tibetan calendar: ཤིང་ཕོ་སྤྲེ་ལོ་ (male Wood-Monkey); 631 or 250 or −522 — to — ཤིང་མོ་བྱ་ལོ་ (female Wood-Bird); 632 or 251 or −521

Year 505 (DV) was a common year starting on Saturday of the Julian calendar. At the time, it was known as the Year of the Consulship of Theodorus and Sabinianus (or, less frequently, year 1258 Ab urbe condita). The denomination 505 for this year has been used since the early medieval period, when the Anno Domini calendar era became the prevalent method in Europe for naming years.

== Events ==
=== By place ===
==== Byzantine Empire ====
- Emperor Anastasius I agrees to pay his share of the cost of defending the Caucasian Gates, against nomadic invasions from East Asia.
- Anastasius I decides to rebuild the village of Dara (Northern Mesopotamia). He constructs a new strategic fortress to guard the frontier.
- The white Huns (Hephthalites) from the Caucasus invade the Persian Empire.

==== Vietnam ====
- Lý Nguyên Khải, Jiaozhou's governor, rebels against the Liang dynasty, but is suppressed by Lý Tắc, a state official, and subsequently prosecuted.

== Births ==
- Belisarius, Byzantine general (d. 565)
- Dorotheus of Gaza, Christian monk and abbot (approximate date)
- Dynod Bwr, king of Hen Ogledd (approximate date)
- Varāhamihira, Indian astronomer and mathematician (d. 587)
- Saint Yared, Axumite composer (d. 571)

== Deaths ==
- Eugenius, bishop of Carthage
- John I, Coptic Orthodox patriarch of Alexandria
