= Gilberto Jiménez =

Mexican footballer (born 1973)

Personal information
- Full name: Gilberto Raúl Jiménez Narváez
- Date of birth: 4 February 1973 (age 53)
- Place of birth: Mexico City, Mexico
- Position: Defender

Senior career*
Years	Team	Apps	(Gls)
1991–1997	Puebla		
1997–1998	Atlante		
1999–2002	Puebla		
2003	Cruz Azul		
2003–2004	Puebla		
2004	Club Nacional		
2005	Toluca		

International career
1997–2000	Mexico	3	(0)
- * Club domestic league appearances and goals

Gilberto Raúl Jiménez Narváez (born 4 February 1973) is a Mexican former footballer. He played in three matches for the Mexico national football team from 1997 to 2000. He was also part of Mexico's squad for the 1997 Copa América tournament.
