= Roth Racing =

Racing team

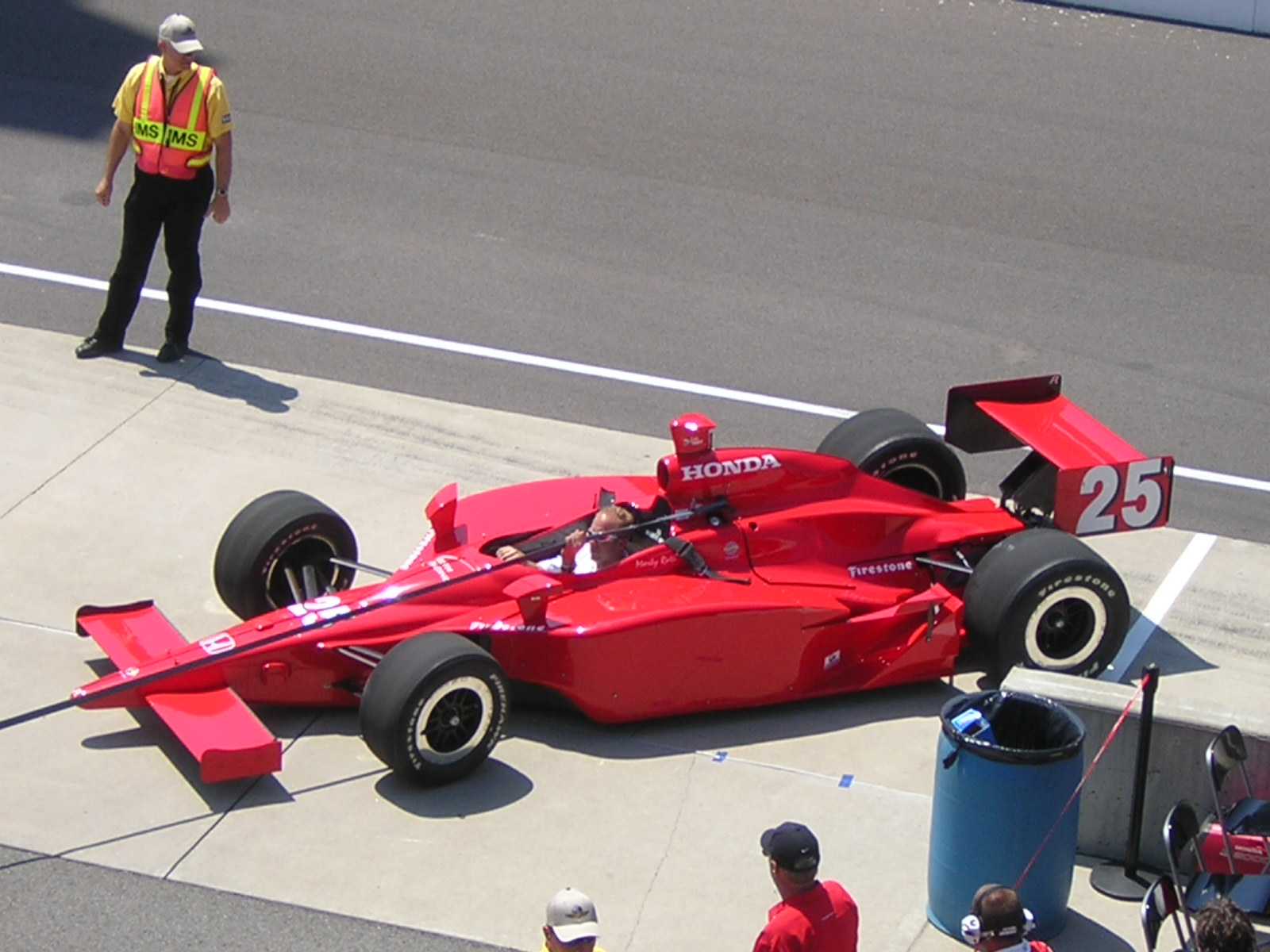
Roth's car after practicing for the 2007 Indy 500.

Roth Racing was a race team owned by Canadian real estate magnate and racecar driver Marty Roth. It competed in the Indy Racing League IndyCar Series.

== 2004-2005 ==
The team was founded in 2004 when Marty Roth purchased the Indy Pro Series equipment of Panther Racing and a new Dallara IndyCar chassis and competed in three Pro Series events and the Indianapolis 500 with himself doing the driving. The team ran a full Pro Series schedule with Roth finishing 8th in points in 2005 as well as the Indy 500 in conjunction with PDM Racing where Roth provided his chassis and funding and PDM provided their Chevrolet engine lease and technical expertise.

== 2006 ==
Roth sold his Pro Series equipment following the St. Petersburg race in April 2006 to focus on IndyCars and specifically his attempt to qualify for the 2006 Indianapolis 500. However, the team never managed to hit on a comfortable set-up for the race car and Roth crashed on bump day trying to find the speed necessary to bump PDM Racing rookie Thiago Medeiros from the field. The team then regrouped and participated in several tests on intermediate and large ovals and returned to the series at Michigan International Speedway in July and ran at Kentucky and Chicagoland to close out the season. Sponsored by Barabco, Roth managed to finish all three of the races he competed in though his best finish was eighteenth. Roth ended up twenty second in points just behind P. J. Chesson.

== 2007 ==
The team returned in 2007 to race on specific ovals and ran at Homestead and Kansas sponsored by Fountain Powerboats. Handling problems forced him to withdraw early from both races. Roth Racing returned to Indianapolis but wrecked the car on the 148th lap. Shortly after Indy, the team decided to participate in the IRL's new TEAM program to race full-time. Roth then decided to purchase Sam Schmidt Motorsports' IndyCar equipment and move into a larger shop in Indianapolis with the goal of expanding to a two-car operation. The team returned to the series in the 2007 finale at Chicagoland Speedway with the second car driven by P. J. Chesson and both cars finished the race, although several laps down. The team was sponsored by Dussault Apparel's Gene Simmons "Moneybag" clothing line.

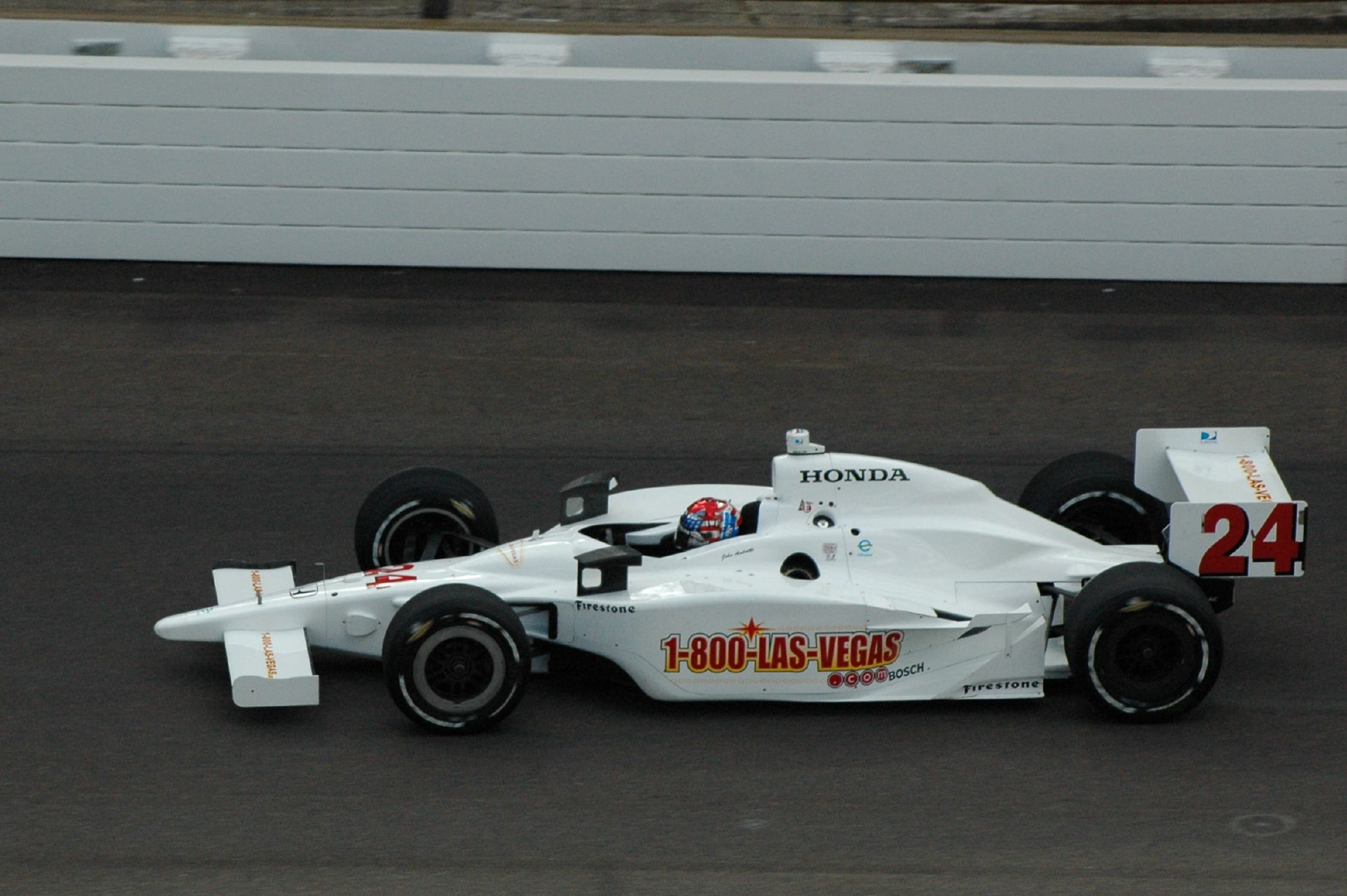
John Andretti driving the team's #24 car in practice for the 2008 Indianapolis 500

== 2008 ==
The team announced on November 26, 2007, that they had signed Jay Howard to drive their second car for the 2008 IndyCar Series season and that Marty Roth would compete full-time in 2008 Sponsored by Cirrus Aircraft. Roth qualified well at Homestead starting eighth but Howard crashed while qualifying. The team began to struggle with finding sponsors after a three race deal with Cirrus Aircraft ran out. Lids and 1-800-Las Vegas sponsored the 25 and 24 cars at Indy but the team was without sponsors until Men's Wearhouse came aboard at Infineon. The team engineer David Cripps left after the Kansas race and was replaced by Vision Racing's Larry Curry who left the team after Watkins Glen. On the morning of Pole Day Roth hired veteran John Andretti to drive the team's #24 car replacing Jay Howard and he quickly posted the team's highest speeds of the month. Team president Margaret Roth confirmed that Howard will return after the Indy 500. However, on May 30 it was announced that Andretti would continue in the #24 car in the Milwaukee Mile and Texas Motor Speedway races. Andretti also stayed to drive at Iowa and Richmond. Due to lack of sponsorship the team ran one car and the team only fielded Jay Howard in the 24 car at Watkins Glen. In Nashville Roth drove the 24 car and the #25 car did not make an appearance. Roth drove the #25 car in the majority of the season's remaining races. Following being informed that his league license would not be renewed in 2009, Roth placed the team up for sale in October 2008.

It was rumored that former Champ Car World Series driver Nelson Philippe, brother Richard Philippe and their family had bought the team's equipment and race shop and would continue the team as Team France, but this did not come to fruition.

== 2009 ==
Roth Racing entered two cars in the 2009 Indianapolis 500, number 25 and 52. Neither car actually appeared at the track, although Roth Racing banners had been placed above the garages.

In August 2009, the teams' race equipment was sold to the new FAZZT Race Team.

== Driver History ==
- (Canada) Marty Roth (2004-2008)
- (United States) P. J. Chesson (2007)
- (United Kingdom) Jay Howard (2008)
- (United States) John Andretti (2008)

== Racing results ==
=== Complete IRL IndyCar Series results ===
(key)

Year	Chassis	Engine	Drivers	No.	1	2	3	4	5	6	7	8	9	10	11	12	13	14	15	16	17	18	19
2004					HMS	PHX	MOT	INDY	TXS	RIR	KAN	NSH	MIL	MCH	KTY	PPIR	NAZ	CHI	FON	TXS			
2004	Dallara IR-04	Toyota Indy V8	(Canada) Marty Roth	25				24															
2005					HMS	PHX	STP	MOT	INDY	TXS	RIR	KAN	NSH	MIL	MCH	KTY	PPIR	SNM	CHI	WGL	FON		
2005	Dallara IR-05	Chevrolet Indy V8	(Canada) Marty Roth	25					31														
2006					HMS	STP	MOT	INDY	WGL	TXS	RIR	KAN	NSH	MIL	MCH	KTY	SNM	CHI					
2006	Dallara IR-05	Honda HI6R V8	(Canada) Marty Roth	25				DNQ							18	18		19					
2007					HMS	STP	MOT	KAN	INDY	MIL	TXS	IOW	RIR	WGL	NSH	MDO	MCH	KTY	SNM	DET	CHI		
2007	Dallara IR-05	Honda HI7R V8	(Canada) Marty Roth	25	15			21	28												14		
2007	Dallara IR-05	Honda HI7R V8	(United States) P. J. Chesson	76																	19		
2008					HMS	STP	MOT	LBH	KAN	INDY	MIL	TXS	IOW	RIR	WGL	NSH	MDO	EDM	KTY	SNM	DET	CHI	SRF^{1}
2008	Dallara IR-05	Honda HI7R V8	(United Kingdom) Jay Howard	24	22	14	13		13						26								
2008	Dallara IR-05	Honda HI7R V8	(United States) John Andretti	24						16	19	16	11	21									
2008	Dallara IR-05	Honda HI7R V8	(Canada) Marty Roth	25	21	DNS	17		26	32	DNS	22	DNS	19		13	21	21	23	26	DNS	16	

1. Non-points-paying exhibition race.
