= Jimmy Kite =

American racing driver

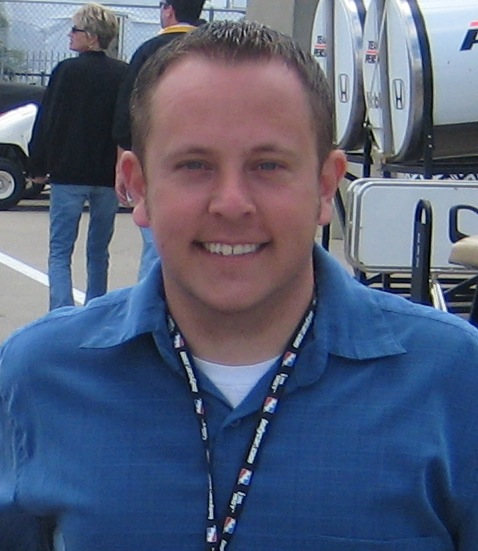
- Kite at the Indianapolis Motor Speedway in 2008
- Born: February 18, 1976 (age 50) Effingham, Illinois, U.S.

IRL IndyCar Series
- Years active: 1997–2003, 2005, 2007
- Former teams: Team Scandia; Sinden Racing; McCormack Motorsports; Blueprint Racing; Sam Schmidt Motorsports; PDM Racing; Hemelgarn Racing
- Starts: 34
- Wins: 0
- Poles: 0
- Best finish: 22nd in 2005

Previous series
- 2007 2005 1998 1994-1995, 1997, 1999-2001, 2002-2003, 2005: Indy Lights; Craftsman Truck Series; ARCA Racing Series; USAC Silver Crown Series

Awards
- 1997: USAC Sliver Crown Rookie of the Year

NASCAR FedEx Freight Truck Series career
- 4 races run over 1 year
- Best finish: 49th (2005)
- First race: 2005 World Financial Group 200 (Atlanta)
- Last race: 2005 O'Reilly Auto Parts 250 (Kansas)
Wins	Top tens	Poles
0	0	0

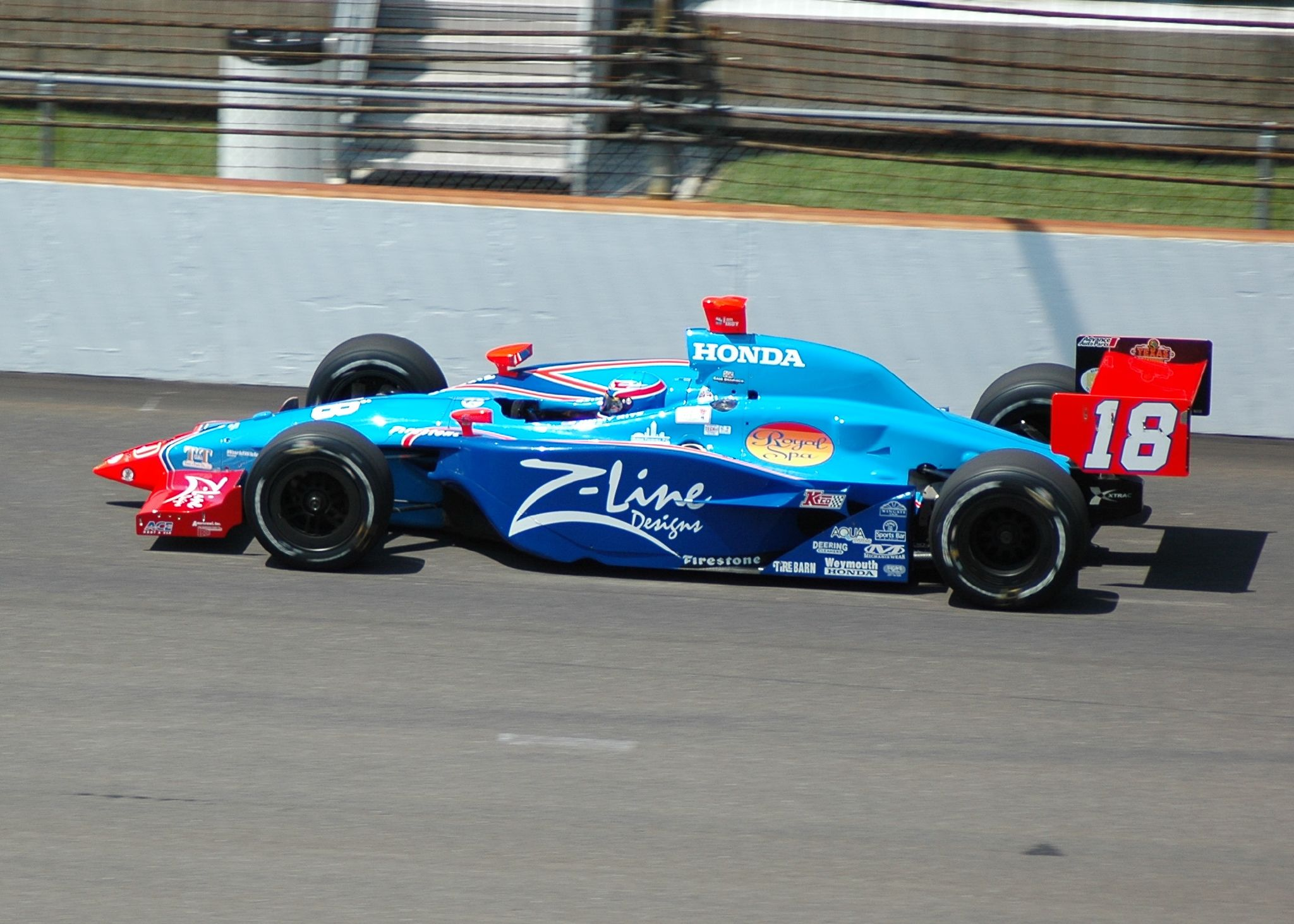
Practicing for the 2007 Indianapolis 500

Jimmy Kite (born February 18, 1976, in Effingham, Illinois) is a retired American race car driver. He debuted in the Indy Racing League IndyCar Series in 1997 and has competed in 34 IndyCar races, including five Indianapolis 500s.

In 2005, Kite intended to compete in the NASCAR Craftsman Truck Series and he made four starts before being called to replace the injured Paul Dana for Hemelgarn Racing in the IRL, where he completed the season after the Indy 500.

Largely out of racing since the end of the 2005 season, Kite founded JK Hobby World in November 2006. He failed in his attempt to qualify for the 2007 Indianapolis 500 in the PDM Racing No. 18 Panoz and failed to secure a ride for the 2008 race.

== Motorsports career results ==
=== American open-wheel ===
(key) (Races in bold indicate pole position)

==== IndyCar ====
Year	Team	1	2	3	4	5	6	7	8	9	10	11	12	13	14	15	16	17	Rank	Points	Ref
1996-97	Team Scandia	NHM	LVS	WDW	PHX	INDY	TXS	PPIR; 20	CLT; 15	NH2; 23	LV2; 6								27th	76	
1998	Team Scandia	WDW; 16	PHX; 18	INDY; 11	TXS; Wth	NHM	DOV												31st	52	
1998	Sinden Racing Services							CLT; 23	PPIR	ATL	TX2	LVS							31st	52	
1999	McCormack Motorsports	WDW	PHX	CLT	INDY; 24	TXS; 25	PPIR; 15	ATL; 9	DOV; 16	PPIR; 8	LVS	TX2							24th	86	
2000	Blueprint Racing	WDW	PHX; 16	LSV; 16	INDY; 30	TXS; 16	PPIR; 24	ATL; 12	KTY; 17	TX2; 21									24th	79	
2001	McCormack Motorsports	PHX	HMS	ATL	INDY; DNQ	TXS	PPIR	RIR	KAN	NSH	KTY	STL	CHI	TX2					NC	-	
2002	Sam Schmidt Motorsports	HMS	PHX	FON	NAZ	INDY; DNQ	TXS	PPIR	RIR	KAN	NSH	MCH	KTY	GAT	CHI	TX2			NC	-	
2003	PDM Racing	HMS	PHX	MOT	INDY; 13	TXS	PPIR	RIR	KAN	NSH	MCH	STK	KTY	NAZ	CHI	FON	TX2		32nd	17	
2005	Hemelgarn	HMS	PHX	STP	MOT	INDY; 32	TXS; 22	RIR; 13	KAN; 19	NSH; 13	MIL; 14	MCH; 13	KTY; 10	PPIR; 17	SNM	CHI; 18	WGL	FON; 13	22nd	163	
2007	PDM Racing	HMS	STP	MOT	KAN	INDY; DNQ	MIL	TXS	IOW	RIR	WGL	NSH	MOH	MCH	KTY	SNM	DET	CHI	NC	-	

Years	Teams	Races	Poles	Wins	Podiums (Non-win)	Top 10s (Non-podium)	Indianapolis 500 Wins	Championships
9	7	34	0	0	0	4	0	0

==== Indy 500 results ====
Year	Chassis	Engine	Start	Finish	Team
1998	Dallara	Oldsmobile	26th	11th	Scandia
1999	G-Force	Oldsmobile	28th	24th	McCormack
2000	G-Force	Oldsmobile	25th	30th	Blueprint Racing
2001	G-Force	Oldsmobile	Failed to Qualify		McCormack
2002	Dallara	Chevrolet	Failed to Qualify		Schmidt
2003	Dallara	Chevrolet	32nd	13th	PDM
2005	Dallara	Toyota	32nd	32nd	Hemelgarn
2007	Panoz	Honda	Failed to Qualify		PDM

==== Indy Lights ====
Year	Team	1	2	3	4	5	6	7	8	9	10	11	12	13	14	15	16	Rank	Points
2007	SWE Racing	HMS	STP1	STP2	INDY	MIL	IMS1	IMS2	IOW	WGL1	WGL2	NSH	MOH	KTY	SNM1	SNM2	CHI; 10	36th	20

=== NASCAR ===
(key) (Bold – Pole position awarded by qualifying time. Italics – Pole position earned by points standings or practice time. * – Most laps led.)

==== Craftsman Truck Series ====
NASCAR Craftsman Truck Series results
Year	Team	No.	Make	1	2	3	4	5	6	7	8	9	10	11	12	13	14	15	16	17	18	19	20	21	22	23	24	25	NCTC	Pts	Ref
2005	MRD Motorsports	06	Chevy	DAY	CAL	ATL; 19	MAR	GTY; 18	MFD	CLT; DNQ	DOV	TEX; 24	MCH	MLW	KAN; 22	KEN	MEM	IRP	NSH	BRI	RCH	NHA	LVS	MAR	ATL	TEX	PHO	HOM	49th	403	

=== ARCA Bondo/Mar-Hyde Series ===
(key) (Bold – Pole position awarded by qualifying time. Italics – Pole position earned by points standings or practice time. * – Most laps led.)

ARCA Bondo/Mar-Hyde Series results
Year	Team	No.	Make	1	2	3	4	5	6	7	8	9	10	11	12	13	14	15	16	17	18	19	20	21	22	ARSC	Pts	Ref
1998	Andy Evans	45	Ford	DAY	ATL; 19	SLM	CLT	MEM	MCH; 14	POC	SBS	TOL	PPR	POC	KIL	FRS	ISF	ATL	DSF	SLM	TEX	WIN	CLT	TAL	ATL	NA	-	
