= Team Leader Motorsports =

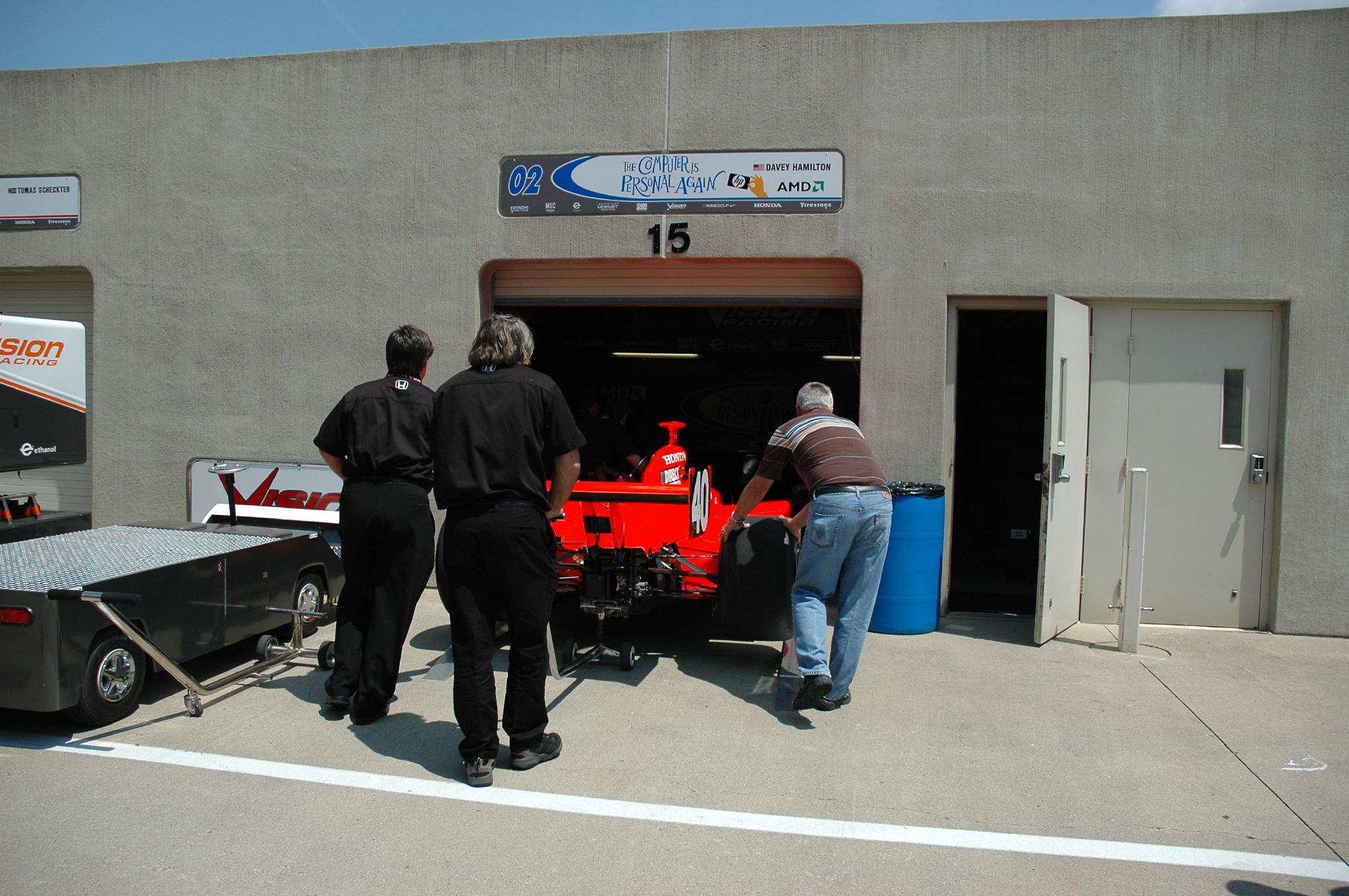
The team's car prior to qualifying for the 2007 Indianapolis 500

Team Leader Motorsports was a racing team owned by R. Kent Baker in the Indy Racing League IndyCar Series that participated in the 2006 Indianapolis 500 and entered the 2007 race. Team Leader participated in the 2006 race in partnership with CURB/Agajanian/Beck Motorsports. In 2007 the two teams became separate entities. Their 2007 entry was modeled to appear similar to driver P. J. Jones' father Parnelli Jones' STP-Paxton Turbocar that he drove in the 1967 race. Jones and the team were unable to find enough speed to qualify for the 2007 race. The team did not make an appearance in 2008.

Baker previously owned R. Kent Baker Racing which was active from 1988 to 1991.

== Past drivers ==
=== R. Kent Baker Racing ===
- (United States) Phil Krueger (1988)
- (United States) John Paul Jr. (1989)
- (United States) Steve Chassey (1989)
- (United States) Stan Fox (1990)
- (United States) Dean Hall (1991)

=== Team Leader Motorsports ===
- (France) Stephan Gregoire (2006)
- (United States) P. J. Jones (2006)
- (United States) R. Kent Baker (2008–2009 SCCA/DSR)
- (United States) R. Kent Baker (2012–2016 SVRA/GTP3)

== Complete IRL IndyCar Series results ==
(key) (Results in bold indicate pole position; results in italics indicate fastest lap)

Year	Chassis	Engine	Drivers	No.	1	2	3	4	5	6	7	8	9	10	11	12	13	14	15	16	17
2006					HMS	STP	MOT	INDY^{1}	WGL	TXS	RIR	KAN	NSH	MIL	MCH	KTY	SNM	CHI			
2006	Panoz	Honda HI6R V8	(France) Stéphan Grégoire	97				29													
2006	Panoz	Honda HI6R V8	(United States) P. J. Jones	98				19													
2007					HMS	STP	MOT	KAN	INDY	MIL	TXS	IOW	RIR	WGL	NSH	MDO	MCH	KTY	SNM	DET	CHI
2007	Dallara IR-05	Honda HI7R V8	(United States) P. J. Jones	40					DNQ												

1. In conjunction with Curb-Agajanian-Beck Motorsports.
