= Marty Roth =

Canadian open-wheel racing driver

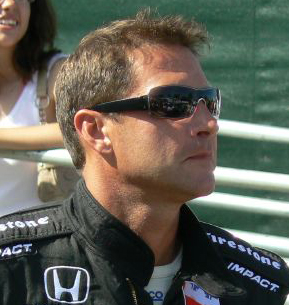
- Roth at the 2008 Honda Grand Prix of St. Petersburg
- Born: December 15, 1958 (age 67) Toronto, Ontario, Canada

IRL IndyCar Series
- Years active: 2004–2008
- Teams: Roth Racing
- Starts: 21
- Wins: 0
- Poles: 0
- Fastest laps: 0
- Best finish: 21st in 2007

Previous series
- 2002–2006 1988–1991: Indy Pro Series; Indy Lights

Marty Roth (born December 15, 1958) is a Canadian former race car driver who last competed in 2008 in the IndyCar Series where he owned his own team, Roth Racing.

Born in Toronto, Ontario, Canada, Roth was a successful land developer in the Toronto area before becoming involved in professional motorsports. He made starts in both the 2004 and 2005 Indy 500 races, as well as competing full-time in both of those seasons in the Indy Pro Series after acquiring the IPS assets of Panther Racing in 2003.

In April 2006, Roth sold his Pro Series equipment and announced that he would move up to the IndyCar Series full-time, starting with the 2006 Indianapolis 500, however Roth failed to qualify for the 500 after crashing his car in practice late on Bump Day before achieving a qualifying run. He returned to the series at Michigan International Speedway in July and ran two more races at the end of the year.

In 2007, Roth ran the Indy 500 and two previous races.

Roth made twelve starts in the 2008 IndyCar Series season. In five other races he crashed (sometimes several times) and failed to start the race. At season's end, he was reportedly told by league management that his license would not be renewed for 2009 leaving his career in the series in doubt. Roth reportedly placed his team up for sale and later sold it to the new FAZZT Race Team.

== Racing record ==
=== American open–wheel racing results ===
(key)

==== Indy Lights ====
Year	Team	1	2	3	4	5	6	7	8	9	10	11	12	13	14	Rank	Points	Ref
1988	TEAMKAR International	PHX	MIL	POR	CLE	TOR; 11	MWL	POC	MDO	ROA	NAZ	LAG	MIA			28th	2	
1989	TEAMKAR International	PHX	LBH	MIL	DET; DNS	POR	MWL; 16	TOR; 17	POC	MDO	ROA					20th	12	
1989	Stuart Moore Racing											NAZ; 4	LAG			20th	12	
1990	Stuart Moore Racing	PHX; 5	LBH; 24	MIL; 16	DET; 6	POR; 14	CLE; 14	MWL; 7	TOR; 7	DEN; 4	VAN; 3	MDO; 10	ROA	NAZ	LAG	11th	59	
1991	Roquin Motorsports	LBH; 11	PHX	MIL	DET	POR	CLE	MWL	TOR	DEN	MDO	NAZ	LAG			22nd	2	

==== Indy Pro Series ====
Year	Team	1	2	3	4	5	6	7	8	9	10	11	12	13	14	Rank	Points	Ref
2002	Brian Stewart Racing	KAN; 6	NSH; 9	MIS; 11	KTY; 13	STL	CHI; 4	TXS; 10								10th	138	
2003	Brian Stewart Racing	HMS; 9	PHX; 11	INDY	PPIR	KAN	NSH	MIS; 6	STL	KTY	CHI; 10	FON; 13	TXS; 12			15th	124	
2004	Roth Racing	HMS; 7	PHX; 10	INDY; 16	KAN	NSH	MIL	MIS	KTY	PPIR	CHI					17th	79	
2004	Brian Stewart Racing											FON; 11	TXS			17th	79	
2005	Roth Racing	HMS; 7	PHX; 10	STP; 9	INDY; 5	TXS; 6	IMS; 8	NSH; 11	MIL; 9	KTY; 7	PPIR; 7	SNM; 7	CHI; 2	WGL; 10	FON; 7	8th	355	
2006	Roth Racing	HMS; 9	STP1; 14	STP2; 12	INDY	WGL	IMS	NSH	MIL	KTY	SNM1	SNM2	CHI			24th	56	

==== IndyCar Series ====
Year	Team	No.	1	2	3	4	5	6	7	8	9	10	11	12	13	14	15	16	17	18	19	Rank	Points	Ref
2004	Roth Racing	25	HMS	PHX	MOT	INDY; 24	TXS	RIR	KAN	NSH	MIL	MIS	KTY	PPIR	NZR	CHI	FON	TX2				34th	12	
2005	Roth Racing	25	HMS	PHX	STP	MOT	INDY; 31	TXS	RIR	KAN	NSH	MIL	MIS	KTY	PPIR	SNM	CHI	WGL	FON			37th	10	
2006	Roth Racing	25	HMS	STP	MOT	INDY; DNQ	WGL	TXS	RIR	KAN	NSH	MIL	MIS; 18	KTY; 18	SNM	CHI; 19						23rd	36	
2007	Roth Racing	25	HMS; 15	STP	MOT	KAN; 21	INDY; 28	MIL	TXS	IOW	RIR	WGL	NSH	MDO	MIS	KTY	SNM	DET	CHI; 14			21st	53	
2008	Roth Racing	25	HMS; 21	STP; DNS	MOT^{1} 17	LBH^{1} DNP	KAN; 26	INDY; 32	MIL; DNS	TXS; 22	IOW; DNS	RIR; 19	WGL; Wth	NSH; 13	MDO; 21	EDM; 21	KTY; 23	SNM; 26	DET; DNS	CHI; 16	SRF^{2}	24th	166	

^{1} Run on same day.
^{2} Non-points paying, exhibition race.

Years	Teams	Races	Poles	Wins	Podiums (Non-win)	Top 10s (Non-podium)	Indianapolis 500 Wins	Championships
5	1	21	0	0	0	0	0	0

==== Indianapolis 500 ====
Year	Chassis	Engine	Start	Finish	Team
2004	Dallara	Toyota	32	24	Roth Racing
2005	Dallara	Chevrolet	29	31	Roth/PDM Racing
2006	Dallara	Honda	DNQ		Roth Racing
2007	Dallara	Honda	30	28	Roth Racing
2008	Dallara	Honda	33	32	Roth Racing
