= 2007 IndyCar Series =

American motor racing season

2007 IndyCar season
- IndyCar Series

Season
- Races: 17
- Start date: March 24
- End date: September 9

Awards
- Drivers' champion: (United Kingdom) Dario Franchitti
- Rookie of the Year: (United States) Ryan Hunter-Reay
- Indianapolis 500 winner: (United Kingdom) Dario Franchitti

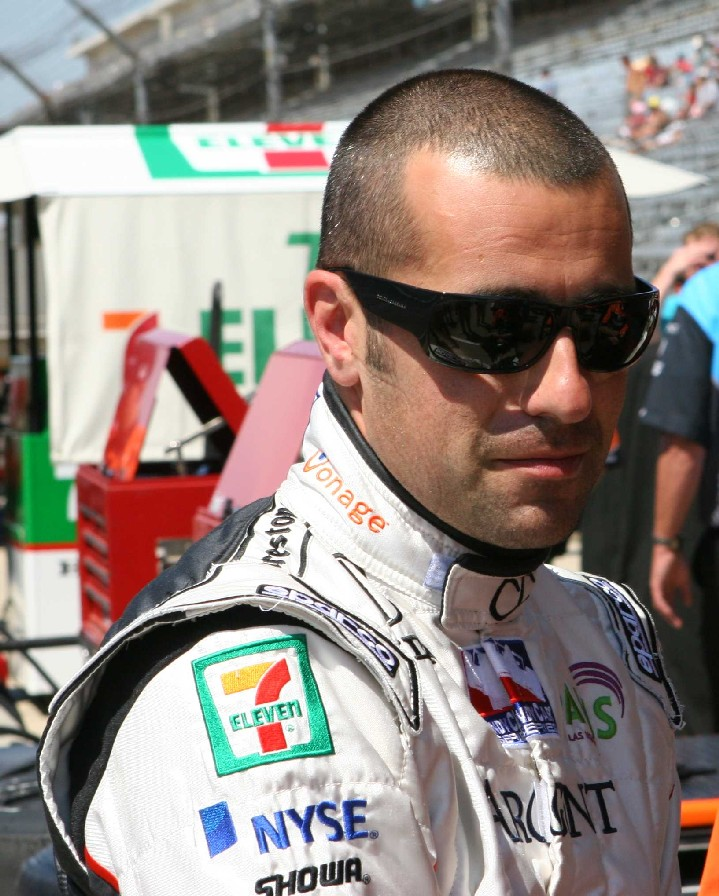
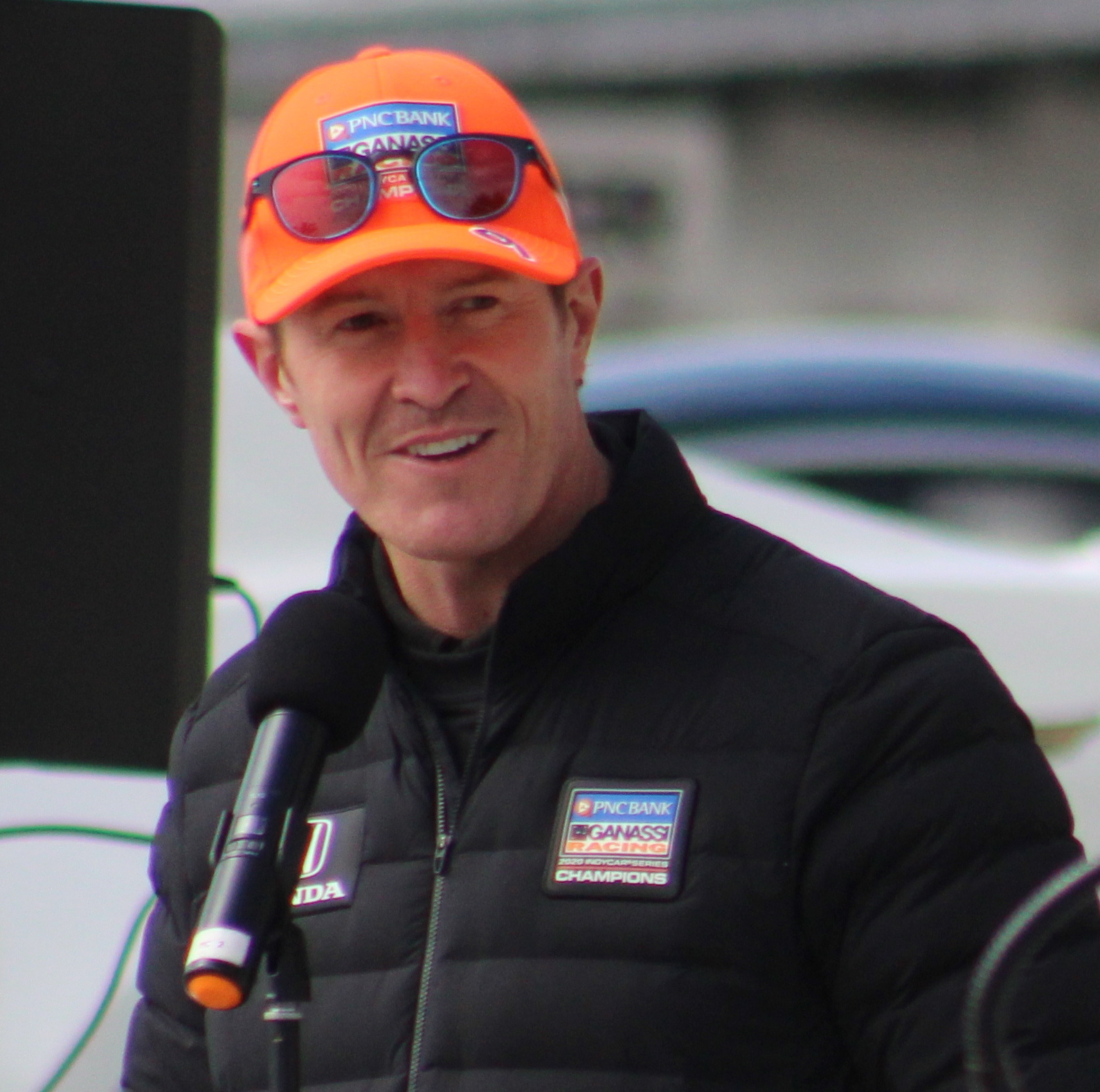
Dario Franchitti (left) won his first Drivers' Championship while Scott Dixon (right) finished second, 13 points behind.

The 2007 IndyCar Series was the 12th season of the IndyCar Series, a motor racing series recognized by its sanctioning body, the Indy Racing League (IRL), as a top-class American open-wheel car racing formula. It encompassed the 96th national open-wheel championship season with the rival Champ Car World Series' 2007 season. The season was contested over 17 races, beginning at Homestead on March 24 and ending at Chicagoland on September 9. Teams and drivers competed for the Drivers', Entrants', and Chassis Manufacturers' Championships, respectively won by Dario Franchitti, Andretti Green Racing, and Dallara. Ryan Hunter-Reay won the Rookie of the Year title.

The schedule saw the additions of the newly built Iowa Speedway, the Mid-Ohio Sports Car Course, and the Raceway at Belle Isle Park; the latter two tracks were former mainstays on the Champ Car World Series calendar, but had not hosted an American open-wheel car race since 2003 and 2001, respectively. The 'IRL' moniker was also dropped from the series' name because of its negative connotation among American open-wheel car racing fans.

Franchitti gradually built momentum in the first half of the season, winning three races—including the series' most prestigious event, the 91st Indianapolis 500—and widening his championship advantage to as much as 65 points after the SunTrust Indy Challenge. However, during the summer months, Franchitti's lead dwindled as he was set back by two flips in successive races, while Scott Dixon took four victories, the last of which allowed him to take the championship lead with two races left. Franchitti reclaimed the top spot despite a controversial crash with Dixon at the Detroit Indy Grand Prix and won his first of four IndyCar Series Drivers' Championships after Dixon ran out of fuel on the final lap of the Peak Antifreeze Indy 300.

Sam Hornish Jr. entered the season as the three-time and reigning titlist and finished fifth in the championship standings. It wound up being the final season of his IndyCar Series career before moving to NASCAR in 2008. Franchitti also sought a career in NASCAR and chose not to defend his title, but he returned to the IndyCar Series in 2009 after an underwhelming tenure.

== Teams and drivers ==
The following teams and drivers competed in the 2007 IndyCar Series. All teams competed with tires supplied by Firestone and Honda Indy V8 engines.

Team	Chassis	No.	Driver	Rounds
A. J. Foyt Enterprises	Dallara	14	(United Kingdom) Darren Manning	All
A. J. Foyt Enterprises	Dallara	50	(United States) Al Unser Jr.	5
Andretti Green Racing	Dallara	7	(United States) Danica Patrick	All
Andretti Green Racing	Dallara	11	(Brazil) Tony Kanaan	All
Andretti Green Racing	Dallara	26	(United States) Marco Andretti	All
Andretti Green Racing	Dallara	27	(United Kingdom) Dario Franchitti	All
Andretti Green Racing	Dallara	39	(United States) Michael Andretti	5
Chastain Motorsports	Panoz	77	(France) Stéphan Grégoire	5
Chastain Motorsports	Panoz	77	(Brazil) Roberto Moreno	5
Target Chip Ganassi Racing	Dallara	9	(New Zealand) Scott Dixon	All
Target Chip Ganassi Racing	Dallara	10	(United Kingdom) Dan Wheldon	All
CURB/Agajanian/Beck Motorsports	Dallara	98	(United States) Alex Barron	1, 4–5
AAMCO/Dreyer & Reinbold Racing; Dreyer & Reinbold Racing	Dallara	5	(United States) Sarah Fisher	All
AAMCO/Dreyer & Reinbold Racing; Dreyer & Reinbold Racing	Dallara	15	(United States) Buddy Rice	All
AAMCO/Dreyer & Reinbold Racing; Dreyer & Reinbold Racing	Dallara	24	(United States) Roger Yasukawa	5
Hemelgarn/Racing Professionals	Dallara	91	(United States) Richie Hearn	5
Racing Professionals	Dallara	19	(United States) Jon Herb	5, 7, 13
Luczo Dragon Racing	Dallara	12	(Australia) Ryan Briscoe	5
Camping World Panther Racing; Delphi Panther Racing; Super Aguri Panther Racing	Dallara	4	(Brazil) Vítor Meira	All
Camping World Panther Racing; Delphi Panther Racing; Super Aguri Panther Racing	Dallara	33	(United States) John Andretti	5
Camping World Panther Racing; Delphi Panther Racing; Super Aguri Panther Racing	Dallara	55	(Japan) Kosuke Matsuura	All
Camping World Panther Racing; Delphi Panther Racing; Super Aguri Panther Racing	Dallara	60	(Japan) Hideki Mutoh R	17
PDM Racing	Panoz	18	(United States) Jimmy Kite	5
Playa Del Racing	Panoz	21	(United States) Jaques Lazier	5
Playa Del Racing	Panoz	31	(United States) Phil Giebler R	5
Rahal Letterman Racing	Dallara	8	(United States) Scott Sharp	All
Rahal Letterman Racing	Dallara	17	(United States) Jeff Simmons	1–11
Rahal Letterman Racing	Dallara	17	(United States) Ryan Hunter-Reay R	12–17
Roth Racing	Dallara	25	(Canada) Marty Roth	1, 4–5, 17
Roth Racing	Dallara	76	(United States) P. J. Chesson R	17
Sam Schmidt Motorsports	Dallara	99	(United States) Buddy Lazier	5
SAMAX Motorsport	Dallara	23	(Venezuela) Milka Duno R	4–5, 7–9, 13, 17
Team Leader/Dollander Racing	Dallara	40	(United States) P. J. Jones	5
Team Penske	Dallara	3	(Brazil) Hélio Castroneves	All
Team Penske	Dallara	6	(United States) Sam Hornish Jr.	All
Vision Racing	Dallara	02	(United States) Davey Hamilton	5
Vision Racing	Dallara	2	(South Africa) Tomas Scheckter	All
Vision Racing	Dallara	20	(United States) Ed Carpenter	All
Vision Racing	Dallara	22	(United States) A. J. Foyt IV	All

Key
Symbol	Meaning
R	Eligible for Rookie of the Year

=== Team and driver changes ===
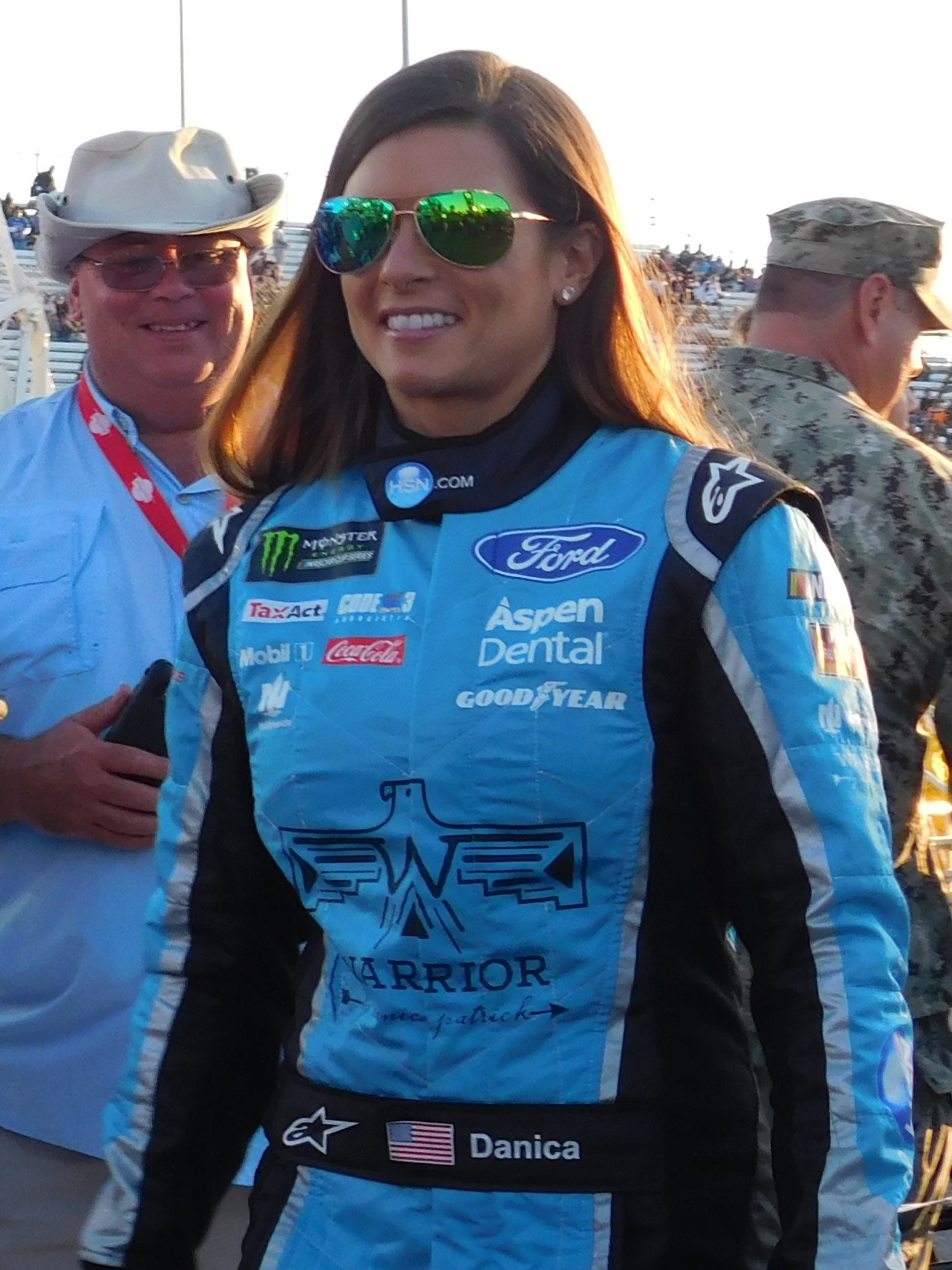
Danica Patrick (pictured in 2017) joined Andretti Green Racing after two seasons with Rahal Letterman Racing.

The future of Fernández Racing was in serious doubt when twenty-seven of their employees were laid off after both of their drivers, Scott Sharp and Kosuke Matsuura, departed the team to join Rahal Letterman Racing and Panther Racing, respectively. Sharp had ended his nine-year partnership with sponsor Delphi due to concerns about the company's financial future, though Delphi went on to sponsor Matsuura's teammate Vítor Meira, who signed a two-year extension deal with Panther Racing. Fernández Racing considered signing sprint car driver P. J. Chesson for the 2007 season, but ultimately moved to the American Le Mans Series (ALMS).

Rahal Letterman Racing downsized to two cars and retained Jeff Simmons along with Sharp ahead of 2007. Two of their drivers left the team in the off-season. With Bryan Herta leaving the IndyCar Series to join Andretti Green Racing's ALMS program, 2005 Rookie of the Year Danica Patrick took his seat. 2004 Indianapolis 500 winner Buddy Rice was released from Rahal Letterman Racing with one year left on his contract with the team and competed in the Champ Car World Series race at Mexico City in hopes to replace the outgoing A. J. Allmendinger at Forsythe Championship Racing, but was later employed to drive for Dreyer & Reinbold Racing with Sarah Fisher, who initially intended on only competing in the twelve oval track races before opting to enter all seventeen events on the schedule. Former Ford Motor Company engineer Jay O'Connell also joined Rahal Letterman Racing as their technical director.

Darren Manning, who had not raced in the IndyCar Series since he was fired by Chip Ganassi Racing midway through the 2005 season, returned to the series with A. J. Foyt Enterprises. Larry Foyt, son of team owner and four-time Indianapolis 500 winner A. J. Foyt, was hired as team director.

Vision Racing expanded to three full-time cars and hired A. J. Foyt IV for their new third entry. Foyt had previously left his grandfather's team at the end of 2005 to attempt a switch to the NASCAR Busch Series the next year, but underperformed in his few outings.

==== Mid-season changes ====
After a year in the Champ Car Atlantic series, Alex Barron was hired to drive for CURB/Agajanian/Beck Motorsports in the races at Homestead, Kansas, and Indianapolis. Marty Roth drove for his Roth Racing team in the same three rounds, but for the season-ending Peak Antifreeze Indy 300, he entered two cars for himself and the 2007 Indy Pro Series champion, who wound up being Alex Lloyd. However, Lloyd's chance to test at Chicagoland Speedway was hindered by a scheduling conflict, so Chesson was chosen to compete in his first race since the previous year's Indianapolis 500.

Grand-Am Rolex Sports Car Series driver Milka Duno entered ten IndyCar Series races with SAMAX Motorsport, beginning at Kansas. Duno and had initially signed with Cahill Racing before their deal fell apart for unknown reasons in February 2007. However, a crash during testing at Nashville Superspeedway prevented her from racing in the Nashville and Mid-Ohio races, and she was barred from competing in the Meijer Indy 300 after being placed on probation by Indy Racing League (IRL) chief steward Brian Barnhart.

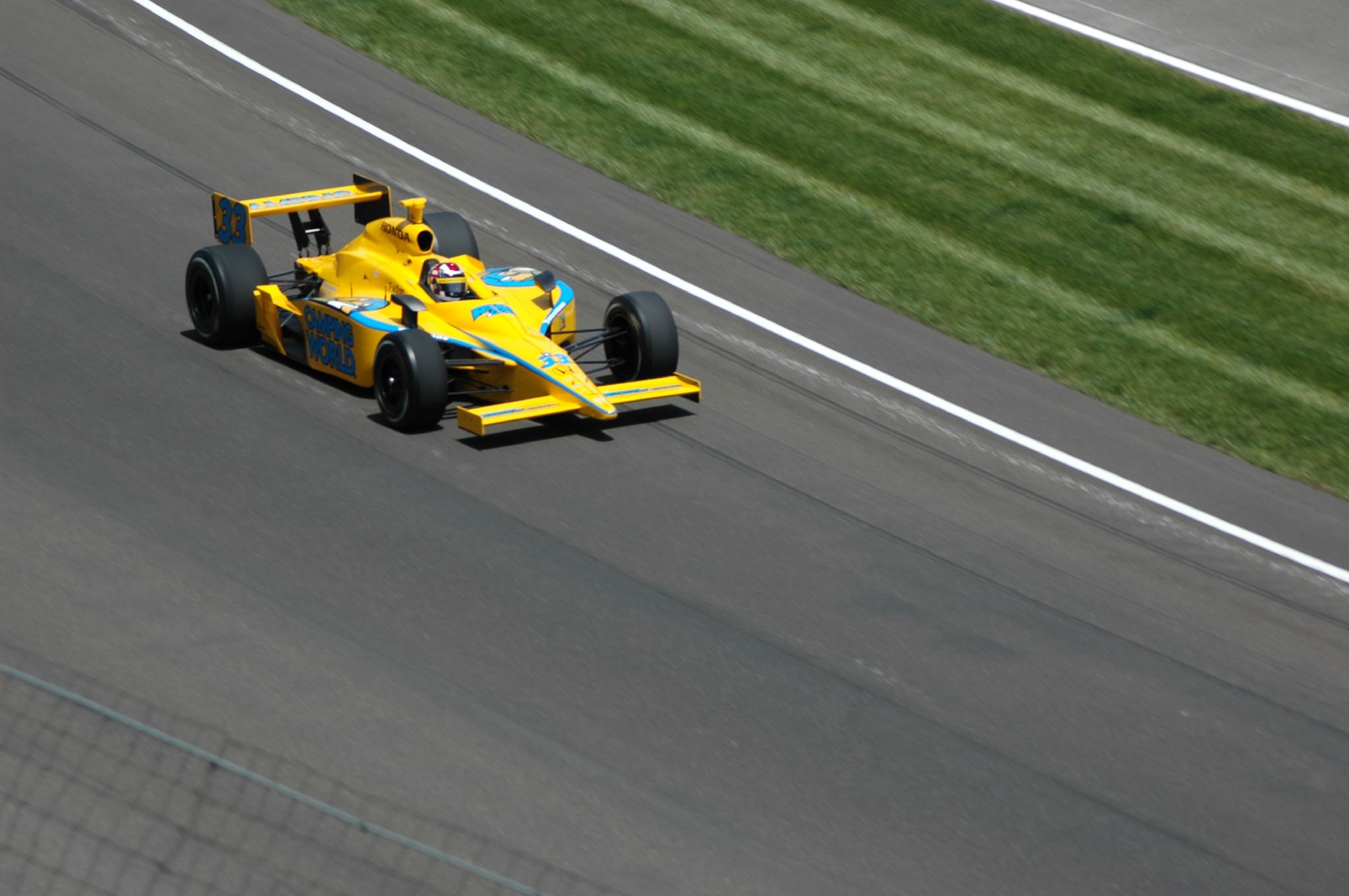
John Andretti was employed by Panther Racing for his first Indianapolis 500 start in 13 years.

Several teams fielded one-off entries for the Indianapolis 500:

- Two-time Indianapolis 500 winner Al Unser Jr. teamed with A. J. Foyt Racing and drove a No. 50 car in honor of A. J. Foyt's 50th anniversary in American open-wheel car racing.
- Andretti Green Racing owner Michael Andretti came out of retirement for the second time since 2003 to compete in the race after finishing third in the 2006 Indianapolis 500.
- With aid from the Linux computer operating system, Chastain Motorsports celebrated the tenth anniversary of the team's founding by reuniting with Stéphan Grégoire; however, after Grégoire suffered an endplate fracture of the T3 vertebrae in a practice crash, Roberto Moreno took his seat for the rest of the month of May, marking his first start in the event since 1999.
- Dreyer & Reinbold Racing entered a third car for the Indianapolis 500 for Roger Yasukawa, who previously ran for the team in 2005.
- Indianapolis 500 veteran Richie Hearn returned to the event in a joint effort with Hemelgarn Racing and Racing Professionals. The latter team's owner–driver Jon Herb also competed in the race and the rounds at Texas and Michigan.
- Ryan Briscoe's relationship with Roger Penske in the ALMS earned him a ride with his son Jay's team, Luczo Dragon Racing, which leased one of Team Penske's Dallara-Honda chassis.
- John Andretti returned to the Indianapolis 500 for the first time since 1994 in a third entry for Panther Racing.
- PDM Racing teamed with Jimmy Kite, who previously ran for the team in 2002 and 2003.
- Indy Pro Series racer Phil Giebler debuted in the Indianapolis 500 with Playa Del Racing and was teamed with veteran Jaques Lazier.
- 1996 Indianapolis 500 winner and 2000 IndyCar Series champion Buddy Lazier drove for successful Indy Pro Series team Sam Schmidt Motorsports.
- P. J. Jones joined Team Leader/Dollander Racing and honored his father Parnelli's near-victory in the 1967 Indianapolis 500 with a paint scheme that resembled the car he drove.
- After years of rehabilitation from severe foot injuries that he sustained in a race at Texas Motor Speedway in 2001, Davey Hamilton made a long-awaited comeback to the IndyCar Series with Vision Racing.

At Rahal Letterman Racing, Simmons was replaced by former Champ Car driver Ryan Hunter-Reay ahead of the Mid-Ohio race because the team felt it was necessary to revitalize their past race-winning performance. Two-time Indy Pro Series race winner Hideki Mutoh made his IndyCar Series debut in a third Panther Racing car at the Chicagoland season finale after completing a rookie test at the track in August.

== Schedule ==
Rather than a single schedule announcement, the events for the 2007 IndyCar Series schedule were revealed one-by-one over the course of several months in 2006. The schedule was finalized with the reinstatement of the Firestone Indy 400 on October 13, 2006.

Round	Date	Race	Track	Location
1	March 24	XM Satellite Radio Indy 300	O Homestead–Miami Speedway	Homestead, Florida
2	April 1	Honda Grand Prix of St. Petersburg	S Streets of St. Petersburg	St. Petersburg, Florida
3	April 21	Indy Japan 300	O Twin Ring Motegi	Motegi, Japan
4	April 29	Kansas Lottery Indy 300	O Kansas Speedway	Kansas City, Kansas
5	May 27	Indianapolis 500	O Indianapolis Motor Speedway	Speedway, Indiana
6	June 3	ABC Supply Company A. J. Foyt 225	O Milwaukee Mile	West Allis, Wisconsin
7	June 9	Bombardier Learjet 550	O Texas Motor Speedway	Fort Worth, Texas
8	June 24	Iowa Corn Indy 250	O Iowa Speedway	Newton, Iowa
9	June 30	SunTrust Indy Challenge	O Richmond International Raceway	Richmond, Virginia
10	July 8	Camping World Watkins Glen Grand Prix	R Watkins Glen International	Watkins Glen, New York
11	July 15	Firestone Indy 200	O Nashville Superspeedway	Lebanon, Tennessee
12	July 22	The Honda Indy 200 at Mid-Ohio	R Mid-Ohio Sports Car Course	Lexington, Ohio
13	August 5	Firestone Indy 400	O Michigan International Speedway	Brooklyn, Michigan
14	August 11	Meijer Indy 300	O Kentucky Speedway	Sparta, Kentucky
15	August 26	Motorola Indy 300	R Infineon Raceway	Sonoma, California
16	September 2	Detroit Indy Grand Prix	S Raceway at Belle Isle Park	Detroit, Michigan
17	September 9	Peak Antifreeze Indy 300	O Chicagoland Speedway	Joliet, Illinois

Key
Symbol	Track type
O	Oval track
R	Road course
S	Street circuit

=== Schedule changes ===
The Raceway at Belle Isle Park was the second street circuit to host an IndyCar Series race.

All fourteen tracks that hosted an IndyCar Series race in the 2006 season returned for 2007, while three new events were added to the schedule. Iowa Speedway, a short track co-designed by former NASCAR driver Rusty Wallace, debuted on the calendar after Scott Dixon and Indy Pro Series driver Wade Cunningham completed a compatibility test at the track and confirmed it to be race-ready. The Mid-Ohio Sports Car Course held their debut IndyCar Series event, the first American open-wheel car race at the circuit since 2003. Due to the success of Super Bowl XL in the city of Detroit, Roger Penske led successful efforts to bring back the Detroit Grand Prix for the first time since it was a Champ Car World Series event in 2001 on the Raceway at Belle Isle Park, which had been modified to give drivers more passing opportunities.

Several of the returning races were also rescheduled or altered. The Homestead and Kentucky races both became nighttime events. Kansas Speedway's event was moved to April 29 as the final race before the Indianapolis 500 because of high humidity during previous races at the track held in July, while the race at Watkins Glen International was rescheduled from June to July 8, the date originally intended for Kansas. The Milwaukee Mile's event attained its traditional role as the first race after the Indianapolis 500. The Texas round was lengthened from 200 to 228 laps, totaling an extended distance of 550 kilometres (340 miles).

The IRL almost dropped Michigan International Speedway from their calendar in favor of a triple-header weekend at Circuit Gilles Villeneuve with the NASCAR Busch Series and Grand-Am Rolex Sports Car Series, but the weekend plan ultimately failed to materialize and Michigan remained on the schedule, though its race date was pushed back from July 22 to August 5 in order to accommodate for the new Mid-Ohio event.

In December 2006, The Indianapolis Star reported that Marquis Sports Marketing, a Dallas-based company, was in coordination to add a non-championship race on the streets of Biloxi, Mississippi for September or October 2007 as an effort to revitalize the hurricane-ravaged Gulf Coast. The event would have been the first step towards building an oval track in the area by 2009. However, the race was quietly cancelled for unknown reasons. Brian Barnhart stated that a race in Portugal was in consideration for the fall of 2007, but it also never developed further.

== Rule changes ==
=== Technical ===
Every car utilized a 100% ethanol blend beginning in 2007 after a mixture of 90% methanol and 10% ethanol was used the season prior, thus making the IndyCar Series the first series in motorsports to use a renewable fuel. To offset the improved fuel mileage experienced by ethanol, the capacity of the cars' fuel cells was downsized from 30 U.S. gal (110 L) to 22 U.S. gal (83 L). The IRL also reinstated the 3.5 L (0.92 U.S. gal) engine displacement that had been in use before the 2004 season in order to provide longer engine life between rebuilds and increase low-range torque for short ovals and road courses.

All cars carried a rear-mounted safety light on the attenuators and were controlled by race officials; it also served as a rain light on road courses. For short oval or road course events, teams were permitted to use any wing angle for the front wing plane between negative and positive five degrees.

=== Sporting ===
Warm-up practice sessions on the morning of oval track races were eliminated, though in order to maintain track time, pre-qualifying practice sessions were extended by fifteen minutes. If qualifications had been cancelled, the starting grid would be determined by Entrants' Championship standings, unlike in previous seasons where it was set by speeds from preceding practice sessions. IRL officials were allowed to determine the rookie status of any driver, regardless of how many races they started in previous seasons.

== Season report ==
=== Pre-season testing ===
The first pre-season open test of the year took place on a ten-turn, 2.72 mi (4.38 km) modified layout of the Daytona International Speedway road course from January 31 to February 1, 2007. It marked the first time drivers could assess their ethanol-powered engines and smaller fuel cells. Tony Kanaan topped the two-day test with a lap time of 1 minute, 12.2493 seconds. The test sparked rumors of a potential IndyCar Series race at Daytona, though nothing ever materialized. A second test was conducted at Homestead–Miami Speedway on February 21–22 to familiarize teams with nighttime race conditions. Dan Wheldon set the quickest time of the test at 24.8816 seconds, but crashed in turn two on the first day.

=== Opening rounds ===
Dan Wheldon (pictured at the Motorola Indy 300) opened the season by winning at Homestead–Miami Speedway for the third time in as many years.

The 2007 season began with the XM Satellite Radio Indy 300 at Homestead, which gave the IndyCar Series the distinction of being the first open-wheel racing series in history to open their season with a nighttime race. After a 45-minute rain delay, pole-sitter Wheldon fended off reigning Drivers' Champion Sam Hornish Jr. in the early portions of the race as they opened a lead of up to 11 seconds over their fellow competitors. However, during a mid-race caution period, both drivers lost several positions because of pit stop blunders, allowing Dixon to assume the lead. It only took Wheldon ten laps to overtake Dixon for the top position, which he maintained for the last 80 laps to achieve his third consecutive victory at Homestead, becoming the first driver in series history to win at the same track for three consecutive years. Dixon finished in second to complete a Chip Ganassi Racing one-two result. All four Andretti Green Racing cars struggled with handling; although Kanaan finished fifth and Dario Franchitti seventh, Patrick crashed at the entry of pit road and Marco Andretti retired after numerous pit stops failed to alleviate his handling issues.

The IndyCar Series teams remained in the state of Florida for the second round, the Honda Grand Prix of St. Petersburg. From pole position, Hélio Castroneves only relinquished the lead when he and others pitted under caution, while Wheldon stayed on-track. During the ensuing restart on lap 35, Castroneves knocked Wheldon out of line and reclaimed the lead, prompting criticism from Wheldon's team owner Chip Ganassi. Despite a faulty transmission in the waning laps, Castroneves took his second straight victory at St. Petersburg by six-tenths of a second over Dixon. Kanaan and Franchitti recovered from a first-lap collision to finish in third and fifth place, respectively. Down the running order, Manning earned A. J. Foyt Enterprises a fifth-place starting position, the team's best qualifying result since 2004, but he spun from the fourth position on lap 75 and fell a lap behind the leaders by the time his car was restarted to finish in 12th. Matsuura, the 17th-place finisher, was upset at Simmons for crashing into him on the opening lap after the two previously collided at Homestead. He used vulgar language in his interviews with ESPN and the Indianapolis Motor Speedway Radio Network after the race, for which he was fined an undisclosed amount of money by the IRL and later apologized.

The Indy Japan 300 was the only race of the season to be held outside of the United States. Castroneves took another pole position and held the lead until he was passed by Wheldon during the first pit stop sequence. Wheldon seemed poised to win at Twin Ring Motegi for a third time, leading a race-high 126 laps, but Kanaan saved enough fuel to take on a smaller fuel load than Wheldon on his final pit stop with ten laps left, giving him a one-second advantage over Wheldon when he rejoined the track. The margin between the two diminished to four tenths of a second by the final lap, but Kanaan held on for the win, his first since July 2005. Though Wheldon claimed the Drivers' Championship lead with his second-place finish, he felt that his performance was hindered by a loss of his team's radio communication early in the race. Wheldon rebounded from his Motegi loss in the Kansas Lottery Indy 300 at Kansas Speedway, where he led 177 of 200 laps en route to become the seventh different winner in as many IndyCar Series races at the track. Much to his frustration, Kanaan—who qualified on pole position for the first time since the 2005 Indianapolis 500— sustained left-front suspension damage from colliding with Patrick on pit road and finished 15th, costing him three positions in the championship standings. With Duno making her debut alongside series regulars Fisher and Patrick, the race gained prominence as the first of any major open-wheel series to feature three female drivers.

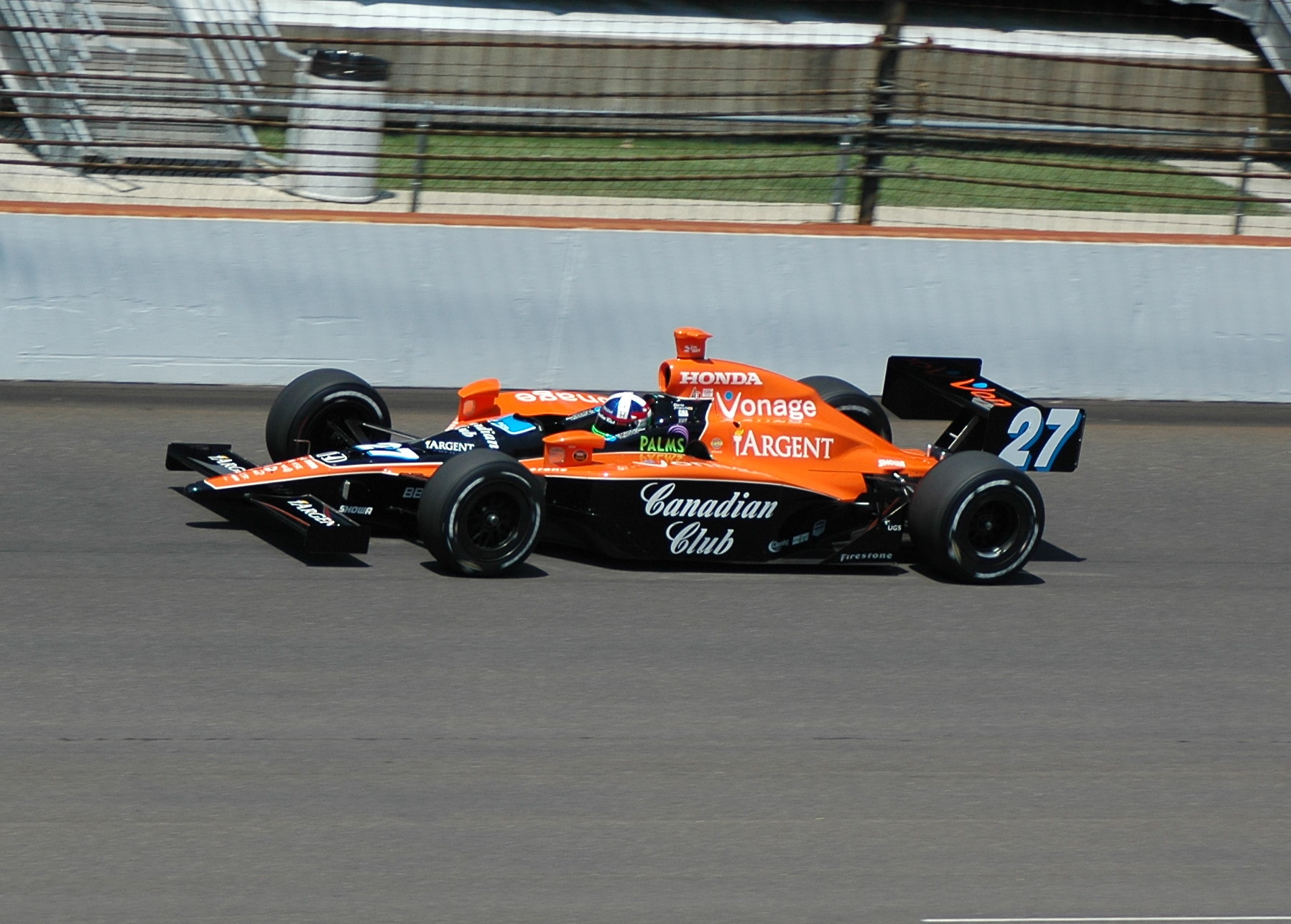
Dario Franchitti won four races, including the 91st Indianapolis 500 at which he is pictured, and his first Drivers' Championship.

Opening Day at Indianapolis Motor Speedway on May 6 marked the beginning of preparations for the 91st Indianapolis 500. On Pole Day qualifications, Franchitti provisionally held pole position for nearly the entire session until Castroneves withdrew his previous attempt that secured him a spot on the second row of the grid in order to improve on his starting position with seven minutes remaining. The risky decision paid off, as Castroneves took the pole with a four-lap average speed of 225.817 mph (363.417 km/h). Kanaan also made a second qualifying attempt at the end of the session, but came up just six-hundredths of a mile per hour short of Castroneves' pole speed. The final day of qualifying, Bump Day, saw Giebler overcome a crash the day prior to bump Kite from the race's 33-car grid.

Despite rain showers that began the night before the race and continued into the morning, the race began as scheduled. Kanaan traded the lead with Castroneves several times before Castroneves fell to 29th because a piece of his refueling system had malfunctioned during his second pit stop. Andretti Green Racing soon became the race's dominant team, as four of their five cars were within the top-five when the race was interrupted by rain for nearly three hours on lap 113. Franchitti lined up in fifth for the upcoming restart, but pitted for a punctured right-rear tire, forcing the team into a pit strategy that was out of sequence with the leaders, but eventually gave him the lead on the 155th lap. Eight laps later, Wheldon and Marco Andretti's wheels collided on the back stretch, causing the latter driver to briefly become airborne and roll several times; he escaped injury. Rain soon returned under caution and the race was deemed official after 166 of the intended 200 laps were completed, with Franchitti declared the victor. As a result, Andretti Green Racing became the winningest team in IndyCar Series history at 25 race wins, surpassing Team Penske's 24 victories. Dixon's runner-up finish earned him the Drivers' Championship lead with 184 points, one ahead of teammate Wheldon and three more than Franchitti.

=== Mid-season rounds ===
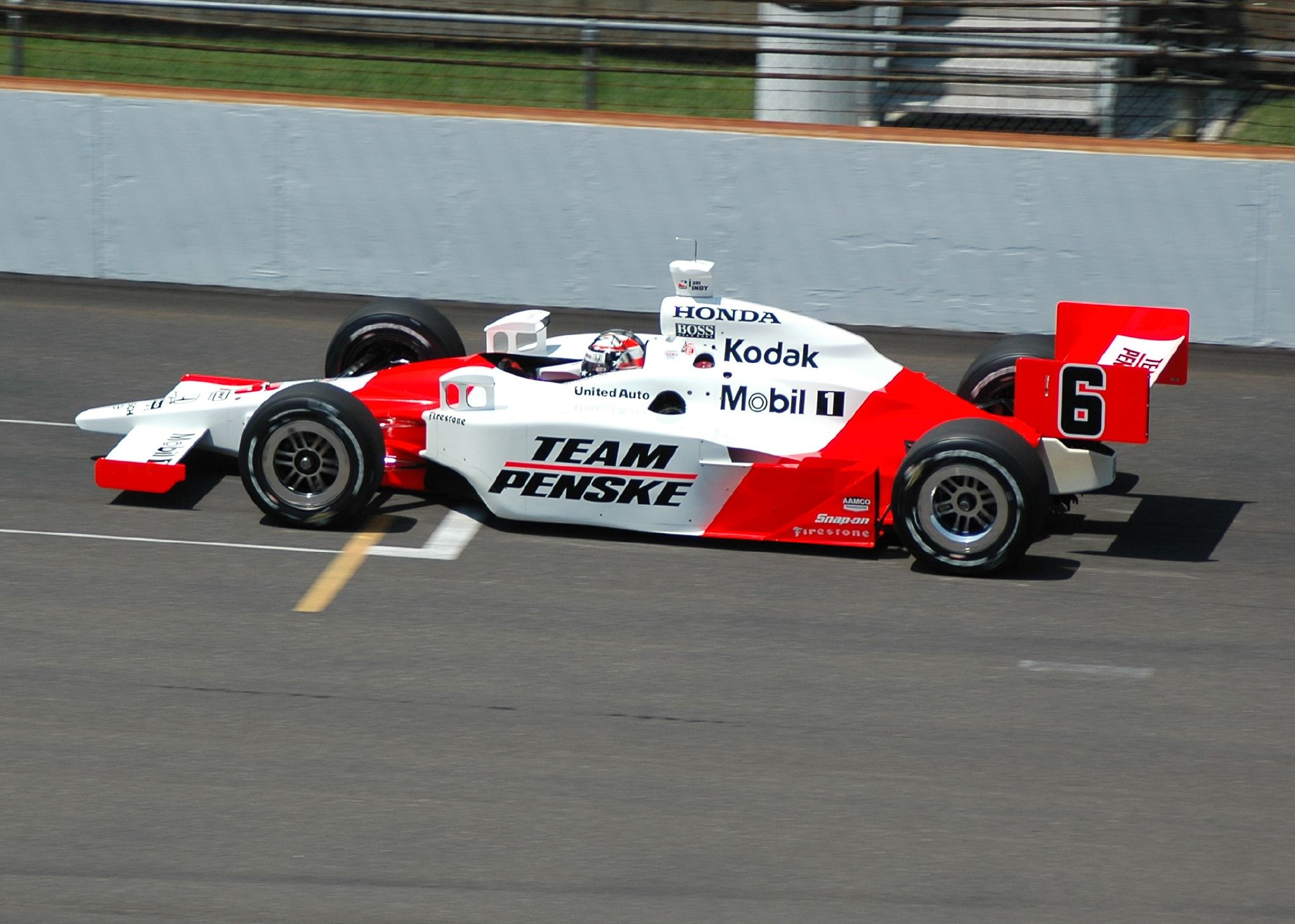
Sam Hornish Jr. (pictured at the Indianapolis 500) earned his 19th and final IndyCar Series win in the Bombardier Learjet 550.

The season's sixth round was the ABC Supply Company A. J. Foyt 225 at the Milwaukee Mile, which began with the event's namesake A. J. Foyt commanding the drivers to start their engines. Castroneves qualified on pole position and led 126 laps, more than any other driver, but hopes for a win were dashed when his rear wing snapped on lap 201, causing his car to spin into the inside front stretch wall. During the resulting caution period, Hornish, who was in second place, had a similar issue and dropped to ninth. From that point, Kanaan assumed the lead and held it to the checkered flag for his second consecutive victory at Milwaukee, while teammate Franchitti came in second to take over the championship lead. After the race, Patrick confronted Wheldon for sending her spinning at the first turn on lap 89, which resulted in her falling a lap behind as her team replaced a damaged steering arm. Patrick grabbed Wheldon's arm and lightly shoved him during the confrontation, but the IRL decided not to penalize her.

At Texas Motor Speedway, Sharp achieved his first pole position since August 2001 for the Bombardier Learjet 550. However, Sharp failed to lead a single lap and lost six positions by the 15th lap, which led to speculation that his pole speed was falsely generated to appease his sponsor. Hornish was the clear threat to win, having opened a sizable lead over his fellow competitors before Foyt IV lost his right-rear tire on lap 196, setting off a multi-car pileup at the turn-four exit which took five drivers out of the race. Andretti Green Racing teammates Kanaan and Patrick attempted to mount a charge on Hornish over the final 21 laps, but Hornish was able to defend his position to take his first victory of the season by seven-hundredths of a second over Kanaan, with Patrick taking her career-best result in third place. Hornish became the first driver to win three IndyCar Series races at Texas.

Iowa Speedway's inaugural IndyCar Series event was one of attrition; over half of the 19-car field was eliminated from crashes or mechanical failures within the first 100 laps of the Iowa Corn Indy 250, including eight of the top ten competitors in the championship standings. Franchitti managed to avoid the chaos and took the lead from Meira with a quick pit stop on lap 152, whereafter he fended off Andretti for the victory. With Franchitti on the bottom line, Andretti was forced outside and resultantly unable to overtake his teammate, trailing him by under seven-hundredths of a second at the finish. The win made Franchitti the most successful Honda driver in American open-wheel car racing, eclipsing Alex Zanardi's 15-win mark, and padded out his championship advantage to 51 points over Kanaan. Meira's bid at his first career win ended prematurely on the 216th lap, when his left-front suspension collapsed under braking while running in third place.

With qualifying rained out, Franchitti inherited pole position for the SunTrust Indy Challenge at Richmond International Raceway. He went on to dominate the race, leading a series-record 241 of 250 laps. Both Chip Ganassi Racing drivers began closing in on Franchitti's lead as he saved fuel towards the end, but he used lapped cars to maintain his gap over them. Even after a collision between Matsuura and Hornish created a six-lap shootout to the finish, Franchitti quickly pulled away from the field to win his third race of the season, further consolidating his lead in the championship to 65 points over Dixon, who took second place in the standings from Kanaan.

Castroneves broke the track record for the pole position and led Dixon on the first 19 laps of the next round, the Camping World Watkins Glen Grand Prix, before crashing in the 11th turn on lap 20. Dixon remained largely unchallenged from that point on, as he held the top position for a total of 23 laps—including the final 18—to achieve his third consecutive victory at Watkins Glen International. However, the win was marred by a post-race confrontation on pit road between second-place Hornish and fourth-place Kanaan, which stemmed from the former contacting the latter in turn six on the 29th lap. The argument turned violent when Hornish's father shoved Kanaan and was subsequently tackled to the ground by an unidentified man. Marco Andretti attempted to pull away his father and Andretti Green Racing team owner Michael from the fight. The consequences of the brawl included $25,000 fines to Team Penske and Andretti Green Racing, unspecified fines to Kanaan and Hornish, and a one-race pit road ban to Hornish's father.

The following race at Nashville Superspeedway was the first in seven years to be pushed back a day because of rain. Dixon, who qualified on pole position, relinquished the lead to Franchitti on the opening lap, but reclaimed the position with a maneuver to the inside line over Franchitti and Wheldon in the third turn on lap 89. Apart from pit stop cycles, Dixon remained in control for the rest of the way to become the first repeat winner of the Firestone Indy 200. His two successive wins whittled down Franchitti's title advantage by 31 points with six races left in the season. Meanwhile, Hunter-Reay finished a strong seventh in his series debut with Rahal Letterman Racing after the team replaced Simmons.

=== Closing rounds ===
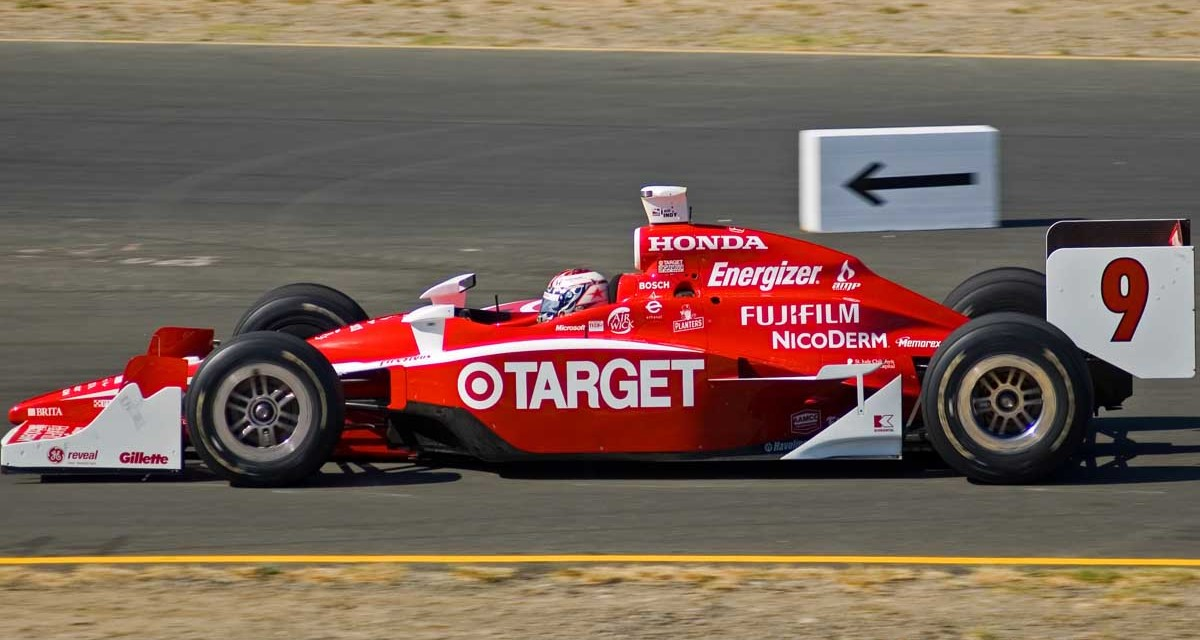
Scott Dixon (pictured at the Motorola Indy 300) finished second in the Drivers' Championship with four wins.

On his 27th birthday, Dixon extended his winning streak to three races in the inaugural Honda Indy 200 at the Mid-Ohio Sports Car Course, tying a record previously set by Kenny Bräck in 1998 and Wheldon in 2005. He started sixth in the race, but vaulted to second place after a first-lap crash which saw Andretti flip upside-down from contact with Kanaan in turn four; he was uninjured. After Dixon made his first pit stop on lap 30, he began trading the lead with pole-sitter Castroneves and Kanaan, the latter of whom attempted to build enough of a lead to retain his position following his last pit stop but rejoined the track in sixth on lap 60 and only improved two positions. Franchitti attempted a similar pit strategy, but resumed in second place on lap 76 and finished the race over two-and-a-half seconds behind Dixon. The win trimmed another ten points from Franchitti in the championship.

The Firestone Indy 400 was the final IndyCar Series race at Michigan International Speedway because of scheduling conflicts between IRL and track officials, ending a partnership between American open-wheel car racing and the track which dated back to 1968, the year the track opened. The race began nearly five hours past its scheduled start time due to rain showers. Franchitti was the quickest driver in the field, taking the pole position and improving 16 positions in the span of nine laps after he stalled his engine at the exit of pit road on the 48th lap. However, he was taken out of the race on lap 144, when his car was turned sideways by Wheldon on the back stretch and pirouetted in the air before landing upside-down and getting hit by Dixon and Foyt IV. All of the drivers involved in the crash escaped without injury; Dixon, Foyt IV, and Hornish had even briefly rejoined the race to gain extra points. The final 20-lap stint saw Andretti make several failed attempts to overtake Kanaan, who claimed his third win of the season. Patrick held the third position until she was forced to replace her deflating right-rear tire with 13 laps left, dropping her to seventh at the finish. Dixon completed enough laps to move ahead of 13th-place Franchitti before retiring, but the gap between the two remained at 24 points because Franchitti earned the three bonus points for leading the most race laps.

On the Friday before the Meijer Indy 300 at Kentucky Speedway, Franchitti publicly blamed Wheldon for his crash at Michigan, to which Wheldon responded that he "expected more from [...] somebody I would have considered a friend." Kanaan continued his momentum in the race, leading 139 laps and winning from pole position, allowing him to cut his gap behind Franchitti from 81 to 52 points. Franchitti vied for the lead early on, but slid up the track in turn four while battling Dixon for second on lap 166 and lost four positions. He then sustained heavy front wing damage from hitting a pylon while avoiding a collision with his teammate Patrick at the entrance of pit road on lap 178. As Franchitti crossed the start/finish line in eighth place, he rapidly closed in on 11th-place Matsuura and drove over his rear tire, catapulting him into the air for the second time in six days. He landed upright after crashing into the turn-one wall and neither driver was hurt. Dixon's second-place finish reeled him to within eight points of Franchitti in the championship, while all three Vision Racing cars finished in the top ten for the first time since the team's inception, with Foyt IV a career-best third, Tomas Scheckter fifth, and Ed Carpenter seventh.

Franchitti appeared to have a competitive edge over his fellow drivers at Infineon Raceway by testing at the circuit ten days prior to the Motorola Indy 300, and further proved so by earning the pole and leading 62 laps in the 80-lap event. However, at the end of the last pit stop sequence, Franchitti collided with Andretti, who had just exited pit road, and sent him spinning into the gravel trap in turn two. The incident left Franchitti with a damaged left-front wing, and on the next restart on lap 73, he was quickly overtaken by Dixon and Castroneves. Dixon beat Castroneves to the checkered flag by five-tenths of a second, the closest road/street course finish in series history, to take his fourth win of the season and the championship lead. Kanaan decided not to overtake third-place Franchitti to assist him in his title bid, which drew ire from Dixon. Michael Andretti commented that Franchitti should have been more patient with his son, sparking tension within the team.

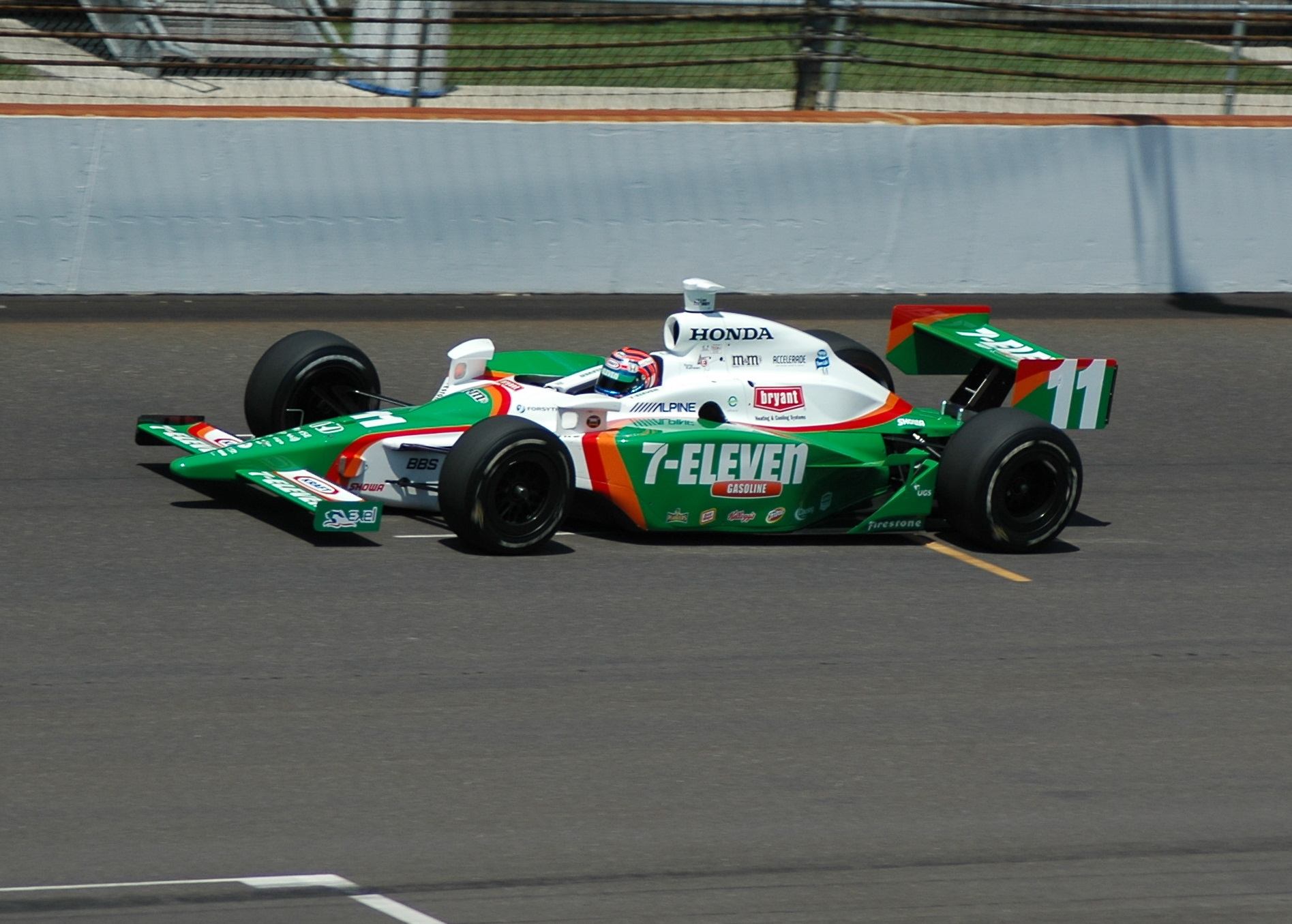
Tony Kanaan (pictured at the Indianapolis 500) finished third in the Drivers' Championship with a season-high five wins.

The first Detroit Indy Grand Prix in six years saw 2000 race winner Castroneves qualify on pole position for the seventh time in the season, breaking the previous single-season pole record of six that was set by Billy Boat in 1998. He held his position until he made his first pit stop on the 25th lap, allowing Franchitti to assume the lead for much of the middle portion. After a late-race caution for a crash between Castroneves and Scheckter sent most of the drivers to pit road, Kanaan chose to stay out and remained in front when the IRL announced that the race would end once it reached a two-hour, ten-minute duration, which ultimately cut the race a lap short of its scheduled 90-lap distance. On the penultimate lap, Rice—headed for a season-best finish of second—ran out of fuel on the 13th turn and was hit by Dixon before crashing into a tire barrier. Dixon then spun and blocked the track surface, collecting Franchitti in the process, but Franchitti restarted his car to finish sixth and reclaim the championship lead. Michael Andretti felt that Dixon purposefully wrecked Franchitti to hamper his title hopes, and Andretti Green Racing co-owner Kevin Savoree confronted Chip Ganassi on pit road. Ganassi was reportedly held back from punching Savoree by Chip Ganasssi Racing managing director Mike Hull. The championship implications of the crash overshadowed Kanaan's fifth win of the season. Despite the widening of the Belle Isle street circuit to provide drivers with more passing opportunities, the only lead changes of the race occurred during pit stop cycles.

=== Championship conclusion ===
Franchitti entered the season finale at Chicagoland Speedway with a lead of three points over Dixon and 39 over Kanaan; with a maximum of 53 points available for the race, all three drivers had a mathematical chance of winning the title, though Kanaan's hopes were slim as he needed a strong finish and issues for Franchitti and Dixon to win the championship. Franchitti won the pole position, but fell behind the Team Penske drivers and Dixon for the first half of the race as he struggled with his car's handling. After Meira crashed hard into the turn-four SAFER barrier on the 137th lap, however, the resulting caution was extended for track officials to repair the barrier, allowing Franchitti and Dixon to top off their fuel tanks ten laps later, thus placing them at a different pit strategy from their competitors. Dixon still remained ahead of Franchitti until a caution issued on lap 194 set up a two-lap finish for the two title contenders as they elected not to pit and lapped the field as a result. During the final restart, Franchitti pulled alongside Dixon, who had the advantage on the inside line until he ran out of fuel as he approached the third turn on the last lap. Franchitti slipped by the slowing Dixon to win the race and the first Drivers' Championship of his 23-year motor racing career by 13 points. Hornish rounded out the podium in what turned out to be the final race of his IndyCar Series career before diverting to the NASCAR Sprint Cup Series the following year.

"The biggest mental challenge this year was jumping in the car in Kentucky, five days after flipping the car in Michigan. To get over that barrier, I thought if I can do that, I can handle anything that's thrown at me."

— Dario Franchitti discussing his mindset after flipping at Michigan and Kentucky.

Franchitti earned 637 points in the 2007 season, besting Wheldon's 628-point mark in 2005 with the most championship points accumulated in a single IndyCar Series season until Dixon won the 2008 title with 646 points. Two days after the season finale, Franchitti was awarded a $1 million check and a mini championship trophy by Brian Barnhardt. Andretti Green Racing also became the first team to win three Entrants' Championships, while Dallara won the Chassis Manufacturers' Championship. Hunter-Reay won the Rookie of the Year title by finishing highest of the rookies in the Drivers' Championship despite only starting six races. For the third straight year, Patrick was voted Most Popular Driver by fans of the series.

== Results and standings ==
=== Races ===
Round	Race	Pole position	Fastest lap	Most laps led	Race winner			Report
Round	Race	Pole position	Fastest lap	Most laps led	Driver	Team	Chassis	Report
1	Homestead	(United Kingdom) Dan Wheldon	(United Kingdom) Dan Wheldon	(United Kingdom) Dan Wheldon	(United Kingdom) Dan Wheldon	Target Chip Ganassi Racing	Dallara	Report
2	St. Petersburg	(Brazil) Hélio Castroneves	(United States) Marco Andretti	(Brazil) Hélio Castroneves	(Brazil) Hélio Castroneves	Team Penske	Dallara	Report
3	Motegi	(Brazil) Hélio Castroneves	(Brazil) Hélio Castroneves	(United Kingdom) Dan Wheldon	(Brazil) Tony Kanaan	Andretti Green Racing	Dallara	Report
4	Kansas	(Brazil) Tony Kanaan	(United Kingdom) Dan Wheldon	(United Kingdom) Dan Wheldon	(United Kingdom) Dan Wheldon	Target Chip Ganassi Racing	Dallara	Report
5	Indianapolis	(Brazil) Hélio Castroneves	(Brazil) Tony Kanaan	(Brazil) Tony Kanaan	(United Kingdom) Dario Franchitti	Andretti Green Racing	Dallara	Report
6	Milwaukee	(Brazil) Hélio Castroneves	(United Kingdom) Dan Wheldon	(Brazil) Hélio Castroneves	(Brazil) Tony Kanaan	Andretti Green Racing	Dallara	Report
7	Texas	(United States) Scott Sharp	(United States) Marco Andretti	(United States) Sam Hornish Jr.	(United States) Sam Hornish Jr.	Team Penske	Dallara	Report
8	Iowa	(New Zealand) Scott Dixon	(Brazil) Hélio Castroneves	(United Kingdom) Dario Franchitti	(United Kingdom) Dario Franchitti	Andretti Green Racing	Dallara	Report
9	Richmond	(United Kingdom) Dario Franchitti	(United Kingdom) Dan Wheldon	(United Kingdom) Dario Franchitti	(United Kingdom) Dario Franchitti	Andretti Green Racing	Dallara	Report
10	Watkins Glen	(Brazil) Hélio Castroneves	(United Kingdom) Dario Franchitti	(New Zealand) Scott Dixon	(New Zealand) Scott Dixon	Target Chip Ganassi Racing	Dallara	Report
11	Nashville	(New Zealand) Scott Dixon	(United Kingdom) Dan Wheldon	(New Zealand) Scott Dixon	(New Zealand) Scott Dixon	Target Chip Ganassi Racing	Dallara	Report
12	Mid-Ohio	(Brazil) Hélio Castroneves	(United Kingdom) Dario Franchitti	(Brazil) Hélio Castroneves	(New Zealand) Scott Dixon	Target Chip Ganassi Racing	Dallara	Report
13	Michigan	(United Kingdom) Dario Franchitti	(United States) Danica Patrick	(United Kingdom) Dario Franchitti	(Brazil) Tony Kanaan	Andretti Green Racing	Dallara	Report
14	Kentucky	(Brazil) Tony Kanaan	(United Kingdom) Dan Wheldon	(Brazil) Tony Kanaan	(Brazil) Tony Kanaan	Andretti Green Racing	Dallara	Report
15	Sonoma	(United Kingdom) Dario Franchitti	(Brazil) Tony Kanaan	(United Kingdom) Dario Franchitti	(New Zealand) Scott Dixon	Target Chip Ganassi Racing	Dallara	Report
16	Detroit	(Brazil) Hélio Castroneves	(United Kingdom) Dario Franchitti	(United Kingdom) Dario Franchitti	(Brazil) Tony Kanaan	Andretti Green Racing	Dallara	Report
17	Chicagoland	(United Kingdom) Dario Franchitti	(Japan) Hideki Mutoh	(United States) Sam Hornish Jr.	(United Kingdom) Dario Franchitti	Andretti Green Racing	Dallara	Report

=== Scoring system ===
Points were awarded to the competitors of each race using the following structure:

Position	**1st**	**2nd**	**3rd**	**4th**	**5th**	**6th**	**7th**	**8th**	**9th**	**10th**	**11th**	**12th**	**13th**	**14th**	**15th**	**16th**	**17th**	**18th–24th**	**25th–33rd**
Points	50	40	35	32	30	28	26	24	22	20	19	18	17	16	15	14	13	12	10

Three bonus points were awarded to the driver that led the most race laps. In the event that a driver participated in an event but could not start the race, the driver and its entry would be classified in the final starting position and receive half points.

=== Drivers' Championship standings ===
Pos.	Driver	HOM	STP	MOT	KAN	IND	MIL	TMS	IOW	RIC	WGL	NSS	MOH	MIS	KEN	SON	BEL	CHI	Points
1	(United Kingdom) Dario Franchitti	7	5	3	2	1	2	4	1*	**1***	3	2	2	**13***	8	**3***	6*	**1**	637
2	(New Zealand) Scott Dixon	2	2	4	4	2	4	12	**10**	2	1*	**1***	1	10	2	1	8	2	624
3	(Brazil) Tony Kanaan	5	3	1	**15**	12*	1	2	16	4	4	18	4	1	**1***	4	1	6	576
4	(United Kingdom) Dan Wheldon	**1***	9	2*	1*	22	3	15	11	3	7	8	10	12	17	7	3	13	466
5	(United States) Sam Hornish Jr.	3	7	5	6	4	9	1*	14	15	2	4	14	9	18	5	12	3*	465
6	(Brazil) Hélio Castroneves	9	**1***	**7**	3	**3**	**16***	16	8	11	**18**	6	**3***	17	9	2	**14**	4	446
7	(United States) Danica Patrick	14	8	11	7	8	8	3	13	6	11	3	5	7	16	6	2	11	424
8	(United States) Scott Sharp	12	11	6	13	6	6	**7**	3	8	14	7	11	3	6	14	11	5	412
9	(United States) Buddy Rice	10	10	10	20	25	18	8	4	5	6	17	8	5	12	11	7	9	360
10	(South Africa) Tomas Scheckter	8	6	9	5	7	17	14	19	7	13	11	9	11	5	8	13	20	357
11	(United States) Marco Andretti	20	4	16	19	24	15	19	2	12	5	5	18	2	4	16	17	22	350
12	(Brazil) Vítor Meira	4	16	17	8	10	5	5	9	9	17	10	17	18	10	9	15	18	334
13	(United Kingdom) Darren Manning	13	12	12	11	20	11	13	5	14	9	9	6	15	13	12	4	21	332
14	(United States) A. J. Foyt IV	18	13	13	9	14	13	17	12	13	15	12	13	8	3	15	9	10	315
15	(United States) Ed Carpenter	6	18	15	17	17	7	18	6	10	12	13	16	14	7	13	10	16	309
16	(Japan) Kosuke Matsuura	16	17	18	18	16	12	9	15	17	8	16	12	4	11	10	5	17	303
17	(United States) Sarah Fisher	11	15	14	12	18	14	10	7	16	16	15	15	16	14	17	16	12	275
18	(United States) Jeff Simmons	17	14	8	10	11	10	6	17	18	10	14							201
19	(United States) Ryan Hunter-Reay RY												7	6	15	18	18	7	119
20	(Venezuela) Milka Duno R				14	31		11	18	19				19				15	96
21	(Canada) Marty Roth	15			21	28												14	53
22	(United States) Alex Barron	19			16	15													41
23	(United States) Jon Herb					32		20						20					34
24	(Australia) Ryan Briscoe					5													30
25	(Japan) Hideki Mutoh R																	8	24
26	(United States) Davey Hamilton					9													22
27	(United States) Michael Andretti					13													17
28	(United States) Buddy Lazier					19													12
29	(United States) P. J. Chesson R																	19	12
30	(United States) Roger Yasukawa					21													12
31	(United States) Richie Hearn					23													12
32	(United States) Al Unser Jr.					26													10
33	(United States) Jaques Lazier					27													10
34	(United States) Phil Giebler R					29													10
35	(United States) John Andretti					30													10
36	(Brazil) Roberto Moreno					33													10
—	(United States) P. J. Jones					DNQ													0
—	(United States) Jimmy Kite					DNQ													0
—	(France) Stéphan Grégoire					Wth													0
Pos.	Driver	HOM	STP	MOT	KAN	IND	MIL	TMS	IOW	RIC	WGL	NSS	MOH	MIS	KEN	SON	BEL	CHI	Points

Color	Result
Gold	Winner
Silver	2nd place
Bronze	3rd place
Green	4th & 5th place
Light Blue	6th–10th place
Dark Blue	Other finishing position
Purple	Did not finish
Red	Did not qualify (DNQ)
Brown	Withdrawn (Wth)
Black	Disqualified (DSQ)
White	Did not start (DNS)
Blank	Did not participate

**In-line notation**
**Bold**	Pole position
Italics	Ran fastest race lap
*	Led most race laps
RY	Rookie of the Year
R	Rookie

=== Entrants' Championship standings ===
Entrants' Championship points were scored with the same system as the Drivers' Championship.

Pos.	No.	Entrant	HOM	STP	MOT	KAN	IND	MIL	TMS	IOW	RIC	WGL	NSS	MOH	MIS	KEN	SON	BEL	CHI	Points
1	27	Andretti Green Racing	7	5	3	2	1	2	4	1*	**1***	3	2	2	**13***	8	**3***	6*	**1**	637
2	9	Target Chip Ganassi Racing	2	2	4	4	2	4	12	**10**	2	1*	**1***	1	10	2	1	8	2	624
3	11	Andretti Green Racing	5	3	1	**15**	12*	1	2	16	4	4	18	4	1	**1***	4	1	6	576
4	10	Target Chip Ganassi Racing	**1***	9	2*	1*	22	3	15	11	3	7	8	10	12	17	7	3	13	466
5	6	Team Penske	3	7	5	6	4	9	1*	14	15	2	4	14	9	18	5	12	3*	465
6	3	Team Penske	9	**1***	**7**	3	**3**	**16***	16	8	11	**18**	6	**3***	17	9	2	**14**	4	446
7	7	Andretti Green Racing	14	8	11	7	8	8	3	13	6	11	3	5	7	16	6	2	11	424
8	8	Rahal Letterman Racing	12	11	6	13	6	6	**7**	3	8	14	7	11	3	6	14	11	5	412
9	15	Dreyer & Reinbold Racing	10	10	10	20	25	18	8	4	5	6	17	8	5	12	11	7	9	360
10	2	Vision Racing	8	6	9	5	7	17	14	19	7	13	11	9	11	5	8	13	20	357
11	26	Andretti Green Racing	20	4	16	19	24	15	19	2	12	5	5	18	2	4	16	17	22	350
12	4	Delphi Panther Racing	4	16	17	8	10	5	5	9	9	17	10	17	18	10	9	15	18	334
13	14	A. J. Foyt Enterprises	13	12	12	11	20	11	13	5	14	9	9	6	15	13	12	4	21	332
14	17	Rahal Letterman Racing	17	14	8	10	11	10	6	17	18	10	14	7	6	15	18	18	7	320
15	22	Vision Racing	18	13	13	9	14	13	17	12	13	15	12	13	8	3	15	9	10	315
16	20	Vision Racing	6	18	15	17	17	7	18	6	10	12	13	16	14	7	13	10	16	309
17	55	Super Aguri Panther Racing	16	17	18	18	16	12	9	15	17	8	16	12	4	11	10	5	17	303
18	5	AAMCO/Dreyer & Reinbold Racing	11	15	14	12	18	14	10	7	16	16	15	15	16	14	17	16	12	275
19	23	SAMAX Motorsport				14	31		11	18	19				19				15	96
20	25	Roth Racing	15			21	28												14	53
21	98	CURB/Agajanian/Beck Motorsports	19			16	15													41
22	19	Racing Professionals					32		20						20					34
23	12	Luczo Dragon Racing					5													30
24	60	Super Aguri Panther Racing																	8	24
25	02	Vision Racing					9													22
26	39	Andretti Green Racing					13													17
27	99	Sam Schmidt Motorsports					19													12
28	76	Roth Racing																	19	12
29	24	Dreyer & Reinbold Racing					21													12
30	91	Hemelgarn/Racing Professionals					23													12
31	50	A. J. Foyt Enterprises					26													10
32	21	Playa Del Racing					27													10
33	31	Playa Del Racing					29													10
34	33	Camping World Panther Racing					30													10
35	77	Chastain Motorsports					33													10
Pos.	No.	Entrant	HOM	STP	MOT	KAN	IND	MIL	TMS	IOW	RIC	WGL	NSS	MOH	MIS	KEN	SON	BEL	CHI	Points

=== Chassis Manufacturers' Championship standings ===
The Chassis Manufacturers' Championship utilized a different scoring system from the Drivers' and Entrants' Championships; the highest-finishing chassis would earn ten points and the second-highest would earn seven.

Pos.	Manufacturer	HOM	STP	MOT	KAN	IND	MIL	TMS	IOW	RIC	WGL	NSS	MOH	MIS	KEN	SON	BEL	CHI	Points
1	Dallara	1	1	1	1	1	1	1	1	1	1	1	1	1	1	1	1	1	170
2	G-Force	—	—	—	—	27	—	—	—	—	—	—	—	—	—	—	—	—	7
Pos.	Manufacturer	HOM	STP	MOT	KAN	IND	MIL	TMS	IOW	RIC	WGL	NSS	MOH	MIS	KEN	SON	BEL	CHI	Points
