= 2008 Meijer Indy 300 =

Motor racing meeting

The layout of Kentucky Speedway

The 2008 Meijer Indy 300 was the fourteenth round of the 2008 IndyCar Series season. It took place on August 9, 2008. This was the eighth time that IndyCar went to Kentucky Speedway.

== Race ==
| Pos | No | Driver | Team | Laps | Time/Retired | Grid | Laps Led | Points |
|---|---|---|---|---|---|---|---|---|
| 1 | 9 | (New Zealand) Scott Dixon | Chip Ganassi Racing | 200 | 1:36:42.3467 | 1 | 151 | 50+3 |
| 2 | 3 | (Brazil) Hélio Castroneves | Team Penske | 200 | +0.5532 | 6 | 5 | 40 |
| 3 | 26 | (United States) Marco Andretti | Andretti Green Racing | 200 | +0.5707 | 9 | 38 | 35 |
| 4 | 4 | (Brazil) Vítor Meira | Panther Racing | 200 | +0.9102 | 2 | 5 | 32 |
| 5 | 10 | (United Kingdom) Dan Wheldon | Chip Ganassi Racing | 200 | +2.1472 | 3 | 0 | 30 |
| 6 | 20 | (United States) Ed Carpenter | Vision Racing | 200 | +5.9531 | 8 | 0 | 28 |
| 7 | 6 | (Australia) Ryan Briscoe | Team Penske | 200 | +6.2271 | 5 | 0 | 26 |
| 8 | 11 | (Brazil) Tony Kanaan | Andretti Green Racing | 200 | +7.0932 | 7 | 0 | 24 |
| 9 | 17 | (United States) Ryan Hunter-Reay | Rahal Letterman Racing | 200 | +10.9526 | 14 | 0 | 22 |
| 10 | 15 | (United States) Buddy Rice | Dreyer & Reinbold Racing | 200 | +21.6858 | 15 | 0 | 20 |
| 11 | 7 | (United States) Danica Patrick | Andretti Green Racing | 199 | +1 Lap | 26 | 1 | 19 |
| 12 | 5 | (Spain) Oriol Servià | KV Racing Technology | 199 | +1 Lap | 12 | 0 | 18 |
| 13 | 33 | (Venezuela) E. J. Viso (R) | HVM Racing | 198 | +2 Laps | 21 | 0 | 17 |
| 14 | 18 | (Brazil) Bruno Junqueira | Dale Coyne Racing | 198 | +2 Laps | 25 | 0 | 16 |
| 15 | 67 | (United States) Sarah Fisher | Sarah Fisher Racing | 198 | +2 Laps | 16 | 0 | 15 |
| 16 | 34 | (Brazil) Jaime Camara (R) | Conquest Racing | 197 | +3 Laps | 22 | 0 | 14 |
| 17 | 19 | (Brazil) Mario Moraes (R) | Dale Coyne Racing | 195 | +5 Laps | 23 | 0 | 13 |
| 18 | 27 | (Japan) Hideki Mutoh (R) | Andretti Green Racing | 157 | Mechanical | 4 | 0 | 12 |
| 19 | 14 | (United Kingdom) Darren Manning | A. J. Foyt Racing | 147 | Mechanical | 17 | 0 | 12 |
| 20 | 2 | (United States) A. J. Foyt IV | Vision Racing | 136 | Mechanical | 10 | 0 | 12 |
| 21 | 23 | (Venezuela) Milka Duno | Dreyer & Reinbold Racing | 130 | Contact | 18 | 0 | 12 |
| 22 | 36 | (Brazil) Enrique Bernoldi | Conquest Racing | 124 | Handling | 24 | 0 | 12 |
| 23 | 25 | (Canada) Marty Roth | Roth Racing | 98 | Mechanical | 11 | 0 | 12 |
| 24 | 02 | (United Kingdom) Justin Wilson (R) | Newman/Haas/Lanigan Racing | 82 | Mechanical | 19 | 0 | 12 |
| 25 | 06 | (United States) Graham Rahal (R) | Newman/Haas/Lanigan Racing | 28 | Mechanical | 20 | 0 | 10 |
| 26 | 8 | (Australia) Will Power (R) | KV Racing Technology | 5 | Mechanical | 13 | 0 | 10 |

| Previous race: 2008 Rexall Edmonton Indy | IndyCar Series; 2008 season | Next race: 2008 Peak Antifreeze Indy Grand Prix |
| Previous race: 2007 Meijer Indy 300 | Kentucky Indy 300 | Next race: 2009 Meijer Indy 300 |
