= 2007 Kansas Lottery Indy 300 =

Indycar race held in Kansas City, Kansas

The layout of Kansas Speedway

The 2007 Kansas Lottery Indy 300 was a race in the 2007 IRL IndyCar Series, held at Kansas Speedway. It was held over the weekend of 27–29 April 2007, as the fourth round of the seventeen-race calendar in the 2007 IndyCar championship.

== Results ==
Fin. Pos	Car No.	Driver	Team	Laps	Time/Retired	Grid	Laps Led	Points
1	10	(United Kingdom) Dan Wheldon	Chip Ganassi Racing	200	1:36:56.0586	4	177	50+3
2	27	(United Kingdom) Dario Franchitti	Andretti Green	200	+18.4830	6	0	40
3	3	(Brazil) Hélio Castroneves	Team Penske	200	+33.2280	3	0	35
4	9	(New Zealand) Scott Dixon	Chip Ganassi Racing	200	+34.4208	5	16	32
5	2	(South Africa) Tomas Scheckter	Vision Racing	199	+1 lap	7	0	30
6	6	(United States) Sam Hornish Jr.	Team Penske	199	+1 lap	2	0	28
7	7	(United States) Danica Patrick	Andretti Green	198	+2 laps	10	0	26
8	4	(Brazil) Vítor Meira	Panther Racing	198	+2 laps	8	0	24
9	22	(United States) A. J. Foyt IV	Vision Racing	198	+2 laps	15	0	22
10	17	(United States) Jeff Simmons	Rahal Letterman	198	+2 laps	16	0	20
11	14	(United Kingdom) Darren Manning	A.J. Foyt Racing	198	+2 laps	11	0	19
12	5	(United States) Sarah Fisher	Dreyer & Reinbold Racing	196	+4 laps	17	0	18
13	8	(United States) Scott Sharp	Rahal Letterman	195	Accident	14	0	17
14	23	(Venezuela) Milka Duno	SAMAX Motorsport	194	+6 laps	21	0	16
15	11	(Brazil) Tony Kanaan	Andretti Green Racing	192	+8 laps	1	7	15
16	98	(United States) Alex Barron	CURB/Agajanian/Beck	191	+9 laps	20	0	14
17	20	(United States) Ed Carpenter	Vision Racing	99	Accident	13	0	13
18	55	(Japan) Kosuke Matsuura	Panther Racing	57	Mechanical	12	0	12
19	26	(United States) Marco Andretti	Andretti Green Racing	43	Mechanical	9	0	12
20	15	(United States) Buddy Rice	Dreyer & Reinbold Racing	37	Mechanical	18	0	12
21	25	(Canada) Marty Roth	Roth Racing	24	Handling	19	0	12

Preceded by 2007 Indy Japan 300	IRL IndyCar Series round 4; 2007	Succeeded by 2007 Indianapolis 500
