= 2007 Meijer Indy 300 =

Indycar race held in Sparta, Kentucky

The layout of Kentucky Speedway

The 2007 Meijer Indy 300 was a race in the 2007 IRL IndyCar Series, held at Kentucky Speedway. It was held over 9 -August 11, 2007, as the fourteenth round of the seventeen-race calendar. It was the fourth and final night race of the season. After the checkered flag, Dario Franchitti crashed and flipped his car flipped for the second race in succession, as he mistakenly thought there was another lap left of the race, and went over the back of Kosuke Matsuura's car.

== Classification ==
Fin. Pos	Car No.	Driver	Team	Laps	Time/Retired	Grid	Laps Led	Points
1	11	(Brazil) Tony Kanaan	Andretti Green Racing	200	1:38:21.7078	1	131	50+3
2	9	(New Zealand) Scott Dixon	Chip Ganassi Racing	200	+1.7457	4	4	40
3	22	(United States) A. J. Foyt IV	Vision Racing	200	+2.1070	10	13	35
4	26	(United States) Marco Andretti	Andretti Green Racing	200	+2.2998	15	0	32
5	2	(South Africa) Tomas Scheckter	Vision Racing	200	+2.3660	6	0	30
6	8	(United States) Scott Sharp	Rahal Letterman Racing	200	+2.6491	3	0	28
7	20	(United States) Ed Carpenter	Vision Racing	200	+2.8150	9	0	26
8	27	(United Kingdom) Dario Franchitti	Andretti Green Racing	200	+6.2839	2	52	24
9	3	(Brazil) Hélio Castroneves	Team Penske	199	+1 Lap	13	0	22
10	4	(Brazil) Vítor Meira	Panther Racing	199	+1 Lap	12	0	20
11	55	(Japan) Kosuke Matsuura	Panther Racing	199	+1 Lap	17	0	19
12	15	(United States) Buddy Rice	Dreyer & Reinbold Racing	199	+1 Lap	16	0	18
13	14	(United Kingdom) Darren Manning	A.J. Foyt Racing	198	+2 Laps	18	0	17
14	5	(United States) Sarah Fisher	Dreyer & Reinbold Racing	197	+3 Laps	14	0	16
15	17	(United States) Ryan Hunter-Reay	Rahal Letterman Racing	183	+17 Laps	8	0	15
16	7	(United States) Danica Patrick	Andretti Green Racing	180	Accident	11	0	14
17	10	(United Kingdom) Dan Wheldon	Chip Ganassi Racing	37	Collision	5	0	13
18	6	(United States) Sam Hornish Jr.	Team Penske	35	Collision	7	0	12
Lead changes: 11 between 4 drivers

Previous race: 2007 Firestone Indy 400	IndyCar Series; 2007 season	Next race: 2007 Motorola Indy 300
Previous race: 2006 Meijer Indy 300	Kentucky Indy 300	Next race: 2008 Meijer Indy 300
