= 2007 Honda 200 =

Indycar race held in Lexington, Ohio

The layout of Mid-Ohio Sports Car Course

The 2007 Honda 200 was a race in the 2007 IndyCar Series, held at Mid-Ohio Sports Car Course. It was held over the weekend of 20 -July 22, 2007, as the twelfth round of the seventeen-race calendar. It was the inaugural race for the IndyCar Series at the track. Eventual 2012 IndyCar Series champion Ryan Hunter-Reay made his IndyCar debut at this race.

== Classification ==
Fin. Pos	Car No.	Driver	Team	Laps	Time/Retired	Grid	Laps Led	Points
1	9	(New Zealand) Scott Dixon	Chip Ganassi Racing	85	1:47:24.2663	6	29	50
2	27	(United Kingdom) Dario Franchitti	Andretti Green Racing	85	+2.6917	5	6	40
3	3	(Brazil) Hélio Castroneves	Team Penske	85	+8.6783	1	37	35+3
4	11	(Brazil) Tony Kanaan	Andretti Green Racing	85	+8.9611	3	13	32
5	7	(United States) Danica Patrick	Andretti Green Racing	85	+25.2578	2	0	30
6	14	(United Kingdom) Darren Manning	A.J. Foyt Racing	85	+30.4606	8	0	28
7	17	(United States) Ryan Hunter-Reay	Rahal Letterman Racing	85	+44.5001	10	0	26
8	15	(United States) Buddy Rice	Dreyer & Reinbold Racing	85	+49.9197	9	0	24
9	2	(South Africa) Tomas Scheckter	Vision Racing	85	+54.5332	12	0	22
10	10	(United Kingdom) Dan Wheldon	Chip Ganassi Racing	85	+55.1833	11	0	20
11	8	(United States) Scott Sharp	Rahal Letterman Racing	84	+1 Lap	15	0	19
12	55	(Japan) Kosuke Matsuura	Panther Racing	84	+1 Lap	13	0	18
13	22	(United States) A. J. Foyt IV	Vision Racing	84	+1 Lap	14	0	17
14	6	(United States) Sam Hornish Jr.	Team Penske	84	+1 Lap	7	0	16
15	5	(United States) Sarah Fisher	Dreyer & Reinbold Racing	83	+2 Laps	17	0	15
16	20	(United States) Ed Carpenter	Vision Racing	82	+3 Laps	16	0	14
17	4	(Brazil) Vítor Meira	Panther Racing	54	Mechanical	18	0	13
18	26	(United States) Marco Andretti	Andretti Green Racing	0	Collision	4	0	12
Lead changes: 9 between 4 drivers
