= 2007 Camping World Watkins Glen Grand Prix =

Indycar race held in Watkins Glen, New York

Track map of Watkins Glen International

The 2007 Camping World Watkins Glen Grand Prix was a race in the 2007 IRL IndyCar Series, held at Watkins Glen International. It was held over the weekend of July 6–8, 2007, as the tenth round of the seventeen-race calendar.

== Race Summary ==
Hélio Castroneves started on pole, but after leading the first 19 laps, dropped out under heavy pressure from Scott Dixon. Dixon, who led 23 laps, held off Sam Hornish Jr. to win the race.

Tony Kanaan was angry with Hornish Jr. for a previous wreck and said he wanted to talk with Hornish after the race. On pit road Kanaan and Hornish walked up to have a civil talk about their incident when Sam Hornish Sr. tried to defend his son by wrestling Tony Kanaan. A brawl broke out and Sam Hornish Sr. had to be physically restrained by IndyCar officials and security. Michael Andretti tried to get into the brawl but Marco Andretti held his father back while driver Dan Wheldon helped Kanaan out of the brawl.

For punching Kanaan and interfering with the intended civil discussion, Sam Hornish Sr. was fined $25,000 and banned from the garages for one race. Kanaan and Hornish Jr. were both fined $25,000 and put on indefinite probation.

== Classification ==
Fin. Pos	Car No.	Driver	Team	Laps	Time/Retired	Grid	Laps Led	Points
1	9	(New Zealand) Scott Dixon	Chip Ganassi Racing	60	1:43:51.5094	2	23	50+3
2	6	(United States) Sam Hornish Jr.	Team Penske	60	+6.2591	5	0	40
3	27	(United Kingdom) Dario Franchitti	Andretti Green Racing	60	+9.7492	3	0	35
4	11	(Brazil) Tony Kanaan	Andretti Green Racing	60	+14.4830	4	0	32
5	26	(United States) Marco Andretti	Andretti Green Racing	60	+15.4749	6	9	30
6	15	(United States) Buddy Rice	Dreyer & Reinbold Racing	60	+26.9171	7	0	28
7	10	(United Kingdom) Dan Wheldon	Chip Ganassi Racing	60	+35.3515	10	1	26
8	55	(Japan) Kosuke Matsuura	Panther Racing	60	+40.7037	11	0	24
9	14	(United Kingdom) Darren Manning	A.J. Foyt Racing	60	+47.6893	9	0	22
10	17	(United States) Jeff Simmons	Rahal Letterman Racing	60	+54.8895	12	0	20
11	7	(United States) Danica Patrick	Andretti Green Racing	60	+57.0833	15	0	19
12	20	(United States) Ed Carpenter	Vision Racing	60	+1:06.9352	17	0	18
13	2	(South Africa) Tomas Scheckter	Vision Racing	60	+1:07.7275	13	0	17
14	8	(United States) Scott Sharp	Rahal Letterman Racing	60	+1:10.3164	14	0	16
15	22	(United States) A. J. Foyt IV	Vision Racing	60	+1:25.2853	16	0	15
16	5	(United States) Sarah Fisher	Dreyer & Reinbold Racing	58	+2 Laps	18	0	14
17	4	(Brazil) Vítor Meira	Panther Racing	58	+2 Laps	8	8	13
18	3	(Brazil) Hélio Castroneves	Team Penske	19	Crash	1	19	12
Lead changes: 6 between 5 drivers

== Full Course Caution Periods ==
There were three full course caution periods during the race, with a total of seven laps run under full course yellow.

Laps	Cause
20-22	Hélio Castroneves crash in turn 11
25	A.J. Foyt IV spin in turn 8
33-35	Vítor Meira tow-in from turn 4
