= 2007 ABC Supply Company A.J. Foyt 225 =

Indycar race held in West Allis, Wisconsin

The layout of the Milwaukee Mile

The 2007 ABC Supply Company/A.J. Foyt 225 was a race in the 2007 IRL IndyCar Series, held at the Milwaukee Mile. It took place over the weekend of June 1–3, 2007, as the sixth round of the seventeen-race season.

== Classification ==
Fin. Pos	Car No.	Driver	Team	Laps	Time/Retired	Grid	Laps Led	Points
1	11	(Brazil) Tony Kanaan	Andretti Green Racing	225	1:47:42.4393	3	25	50
2	27	(United Kingdom) Dario Franchitti	Andretti Green Racing	225	+2.5707	10	0	40
3	10	(United Kingdom) Dan Wheldon	Chip Ganassi Racing	225	+3.1149	4	37	35
4	9	(New Zealand) Scott Dixon	Chip Ganassi Racing	225	+3.4026	2	0	32
5	4	(Brazil) Vítor Meira	Panther Racing	225	+5.2684	9	0	30
6	8	(United States) Scott Sharp	Rahal Letterman Racing	225	+6.8359	11	0	28
7	20	(United States) Ed Carpenter	Vision Racing	225	+7.0360	8	0	26
8	7	(United States) Danica Patrick	Andretti Green Racing	225	+8.0205	17	0	24
9	6	(United States) Sam Hornish Jr.	Team Penske	224	+1 Lap	5	0	22
10	17	(United States) Jeff Simmons	Rahal Letterman Racing	224	+1 Lap	18	0	20
11	14	(United Kingdom) Darren Manning	A.J. Foyt Racing	224	+1 Lap	15	0	19
12	55	(Japan) Kosuke Matsuura	Panther Racing	223	+2 Laps	6	0	18
13	22	(United States) A. J. Foyt IV	Vision Racing	222	+3 Laps	12	0	17
14	5	(United States) Sarah Fisher	Dreyer & Reinbold Racing	221	+4 Laps	16	0	16
15	26	(United States) Marco Andretti	Andretti Green Racing	209	Accident	14	0	15
16	3	(Brazil) Hélio Castroneves	Team Penske	201	Rear Wing/ Accident	1	126	14+3
17	2	(South Africa) Tomas Scheckter	Vision Racing	159	Mechanical	13	0	13
18	15	(United States) Buddy Rice	Dreyer & Reinbold Racing	156	Accident	7	37	12
Lead changes: 9 between 4 drivers

Preceded by 2007 Indianapolis 500	IRL IndyCar Series round 6; 2007	Succeeded by 2007 Bombardier Learjet 550
