= 2007 Indy Japan 300 =

(Japan) 2007 Motegi
Race details
- 3rd round of the 2007 IndyCar Series season
- Map of the track
- Date: April 21, 2007
- Official name: Indy Japan 300
- Location: Twin Ring Motegi
- Course: Permanent racing facility 1.520 mi / 2.446 km
- Distance: 200 laps 304.000 mi / 489.241 km
- Weather: Cloudy

Pole position
- Driver: (Brazil) Hélio Castroneves (Team Penske)
- Time: 26.6416

Fastest lap
- Driver: (Brazil) Hélio Castroneves (Team Penske)
- Time: 27.1247 (on lap 14 of 200)

Podium
- First: (Brazil) Tony Kanaan (Andretti Green Racing)
- Second: (United Kingdom) Dan Wheldon (Chip Ganassi Racing)
- Third: (United Kingdom) Dario Franchitti (Andretti Green Racing)

The 2007 Indy Japan 300 was an IndyCar Series motor race held on April 21, 2007, at the Twin Ring Motegi in Motegi, Tochigi, Japan. It was the third race of the 2007 IndyCar Series season, the fifth annual edition of the Indy Japan 300 in the IndyCar Series, and the tenth anniversary running of the race (including its five years on the Championship Auto Racing Teams (CART) schedule). Andretti Green Racing driver Tony Kanaan won the race with a 0.4828 second margin of victory over Chip Ganassi Racing's Dan Wheldon. Dario Franchitti, Scott Dixon, and Sam Hornish Jr. rounded out the top five.

Hélio Castroneves, the defending champion of the Indy Japan 300, won the pole position by posting the fastest lap in qualifying. In the race, Wheldon gained the lead from Castroneves on lap 44 and led for more than half of the 200 laps, but a pit stop with 14 laps remaining forced him to relinquish the top position. Kanaan took the lead because of a late pit stop by Dixon, and held off a late challenge by Wheldon to secure first place.

There were four cautions and nine lead changes among five different drivers during the race. It was Kanaan's first win of the season, and the eighth of his career. The result moved Wheldon into the lead of the Drivers' Championship, three points ahead of Kanaan. Dixon, who led the championship before the race, dropped to third.

== Background ==
The Indy Japan 300 was confirmed as a part of the Indy Racing League's (IRL) 2007 schedule for the IndyCar Series in September 2006. It was to be the fifth consecutive year the race was held in the series, and the tenth Indy Japan 300, counting the period from 1998 to 2002 when it was a CART event. Uniquely in the 2007 season, the race took place at a non-American location. The Indy Japan 300 was the third race scheduled for 2007 by the IRL, out of 17. At this early stage in the season, Dixon held the lead in the point standings with 80 points. Castroneves and Wheldon were tied for second with 75 points, and Kanaan and Hornish Jr. were fourth and fifth on 65 and 61 points, respectively.

== Practice ==
Two days before the race, on April 19, a pair of two-hour practice sessions were held at the Twin Ring Motegi. The racers were split into two groups, which were each allowed to run laps for one hour per session. The first practice session began at 10:30 a.m. Japan Standard Time (JST); five minutes later a yellow caution flag came out due to a crash by Vítor Meira, who was forced into a backup car when he returned later in the day. A second caution flag was shown at noon local time to allow for an inspection of the track; 30 minutes later the session came to an end. From 1:30 to 3:30 p.m JST, the second practice session of the day took place. Danica Patrick posted the fastest lap of the day, going around the circuit in 26.9585 seconds in an average speed of 202.979 miles per hour (326.663 km/h). Japanese driver Kosuke Matsuura, who called the Indy Japan 300 his "most important" race of the season, had the second-fastest lap time of the day, followed by Castroneves, Kanaan, and Wheldon.

Before qualifying took place on April 20, there was a third round of practice from 10:30 a.m. to 12:05 p.m JST; the drivers were each allowed 45 minutes of track time. Two caution flags came out; the first came half an hour into the session when Jeff Simmons spun out coming off the track's fourth turn. The other caution was a track inspection, which came 18 minutes into the second group's allotted time. Kanaan had the best lap of the session; his average speed of 204.465 miles per hour (329.055 km/h) topped Patrick's leading mark from the previous day.

== Qualifying ==
An hour and 25 minutes after the last practice session ended, the 18 drivers determined the starting grid through qualifying. Each driver ran two laps, with the starting order determined by the competitors' fastest times. Castroneves, the winner of the 2006 Indy Japan 300, gained pole position with a lap time of 26.6416 seconds; it was the second consecutive year he qualified first. Two-time race winner Wheldon earned the other front-row starting position; his lap was .0328 seconds slower than Castroneves'. Kanaan and Patrick qualified third and fourth, respectively; they were followed by Hornish Jr., who suffered a tire vibration, and Dixon, who would start in the third row. Dario Franchitti and Tomas Scheckter qualified in the fourth row, while Matsuura and Marco Andretti rounded out the top 10. The difference between the first and tenth-best lap times was less than three-tenths of a second.

=== Qualifying classification ===
Qualifying results
Pos	No.	Driver	Team	Time	Speed
1	3	Hélio Castroneves (BRA)	Team Penske	26.6416	205.393
2	10	Dan Wheldon (UK)	Chip Ganassi Racing	26.6744	205.141
3	11	Tony Kanaan (BRA)	Andretti Green Racing	26.7217	204.777
4	7	Danica Patrick (USA)	Andretti Green Racing	26.7881	204.270
5	6	Sam Hornish Jr. (USA)	Team Penske	26.8495	203.803
6	9	Scott Dixon (NZL)	Chip Ganassi Racing	26.8561	203.753
7	27	Dario Franchitti (UK)	Andretti Green Racing	26.8600	203.723
8	2	Tomas Scheckter (RSA)	Vision Racing	26.8773	203.592
9	55	Kosuke Matsuura (JPN)	Panther Racing	26.9374	203.138
10	26	Marco Andretti (USA)	Andretti Green Racing	26.9386	203.129
11	15	Buddy Rice (USA)	Dreyer & Reinbold Racing	26.9945	202.708
12	8	Scott Sharp (USA)	Rahal Letterman Racing	27.0035	202.640
13	4	Vítor Meira (BRA)	Panther Racing	27.0523	202.275
14	22	A. J. Foyt IV (USA)	Vision Racing	27.0757	202.100
15	5	Sarah Fisher (USA)	Dreyer & Reinbold Racing	27.1064	201.871
16	20	Ed Carpenter (USA)	Vision Racing	27.1375	201.640
17	17	Jeff Simmons (USA)	Rahal Letterman Racing	27.4175	199.581
18	14	Darren Manning (UK)	A.J. Foyt Racing	27.4341	199.460

== Race ==
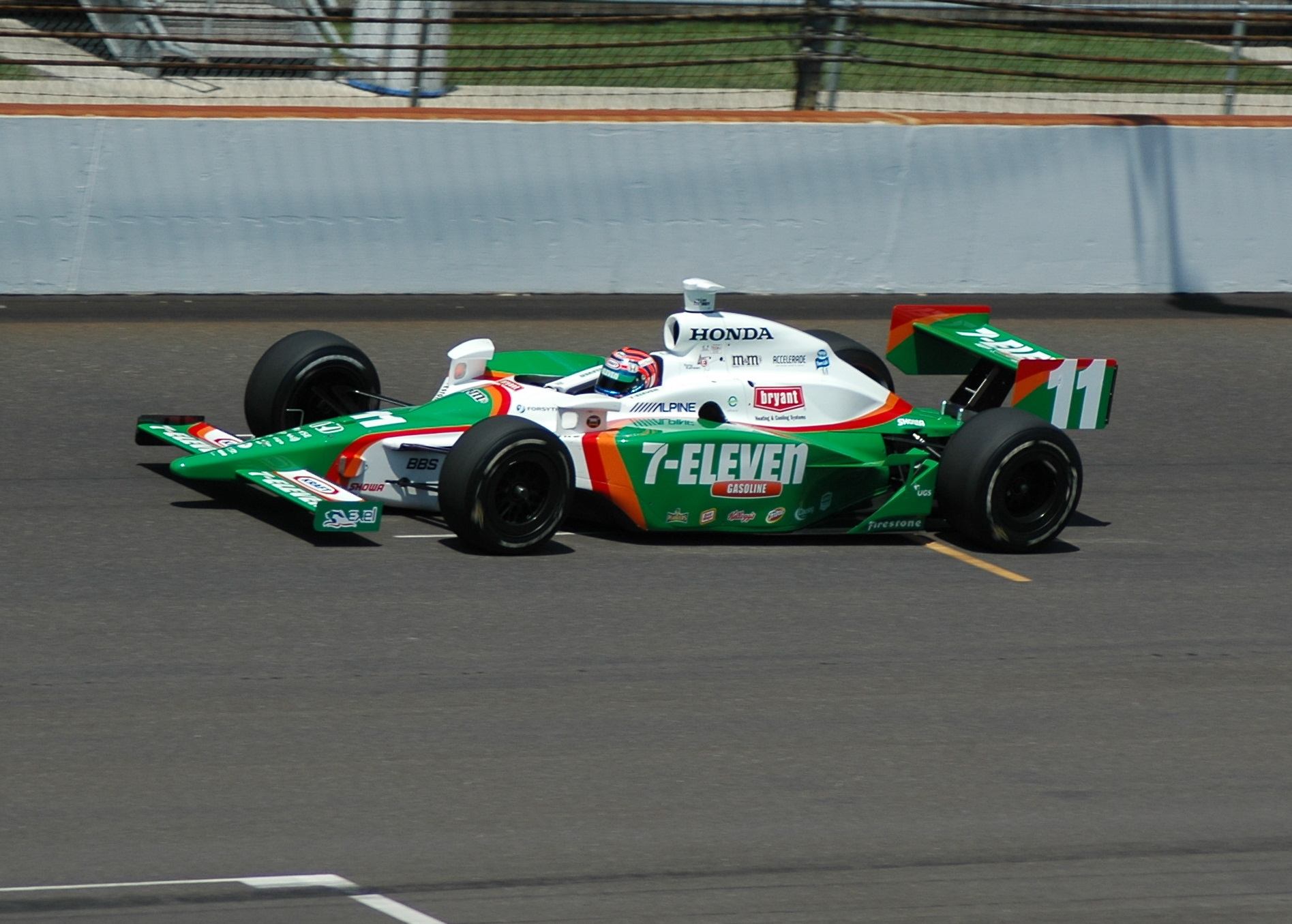
Tony Kanaan won the race after gaining the lead with four laps remaining.

The conditions on the grid were dry but cloudy before the event with an air temperature between 70–74 °F (21–23 °C) and a track temperature of 80 °F (27 °C). Bridgestone CEO Soshi Arakawa commanded the drivers to start their engines. The race began at 1:00 p.m. JST, as Tomikazu Fukuda, governor of Tochigi Prefecture (location of the Twin Ring Motegi track), waved the opening green flag to signify the start. Shortly afterward, however, Matsuura suffered an accident; he crashed into the turn two wall during the first lap after he spun, and did not return to the race. A caution flag came out as a result of the incident; several drivers made pit stops for new tires, fuel and car adjustments during the caution, and Meira made two stops. On lap 9, the field returned to green flag racing, and Castroneves maintained his lead, which reached nearly three seconds by lap 25. The second caution flag of the race was flown on lap 31, to allow for the removal of debris on the track in the fourth turn. A round of pit stops occurred during the caution; Castroneves held on to the lead, with Wheldon and Kanaan in second and third. The green flag came back out on lap 39, and Hornish Jr. immediately took third place from Kanaan. Lap 44 saw a lead change as Wheldon passed Castroneves; he would go on to lead 126 of the race's 200 laps. Wheldon gradually increased the lead to almost two seconds by lap 80. Kanaan had risen to second by this point, ahead of Franchitti and Castroneves.

From laps 81 to 90, pit stops were made by all the drivers. After Ed Carpenter's stop, one of his wheels came off while he attempted to return to the track; he would ultimately finish 15th, eight laps behind. At the end of this series of pit stops under the green flag, Wheldon remained out in front, ahead of Kanaan. By the halfway point of the race, Kanaan had begun to narrow his deficit, which by lap 115 was less than a second. Wheldon, meanwhile, was faced with a mechanical problem—his radio was malfunctioning, preventing him from talking to his pit crew; he later said that he and his team "lost radio contact early on". On lap 122, Kanaan made a pass while coming out of turn two, taking the lead from Wheldon. Soon after, the drivers began their third round of pit stops, and Wheldon took back the lead before Andretti was afflicted with oversteer and crashed into the turn four inside wall on lap 135, bringing out a caution flag. The yellow flag period saw pit stops continue. Castroneves stopped twice on pit lane on top of a prior stop just before the caution; during the second yellow flag stop, he overshot his designated area on pit road, and his car needed to be pushed into position by crew members. With 51 laps left, the caution period ended, and Wheldon slowly built a gap over Kanaan of 1.8834 seconds entering the final 20 laps.

Wheldon had to make a pit stop for fuel on lap 186, giving Kanaan, who had been conserving fuel since early in the race, the lead. Four laps later, Kanaan stopped, and the lead briefly went to Hornish Jr., before he too pitted and Dixon assumed the top spot. On lap 196, however, Dixon was also forced into the pits. Kanaan had come off pit road ahead of Wheldon after his stop, and therefore was in position to assume the lead. Wheldon closed in on Kanaan, and by the final lap was less than four-tenths of a second behind. Kanaan, though, held off Wheldon to win the race with a .4828 of a second margin of victory. Third place went to Franchitti, who was over 11 seconds off the pace. Dixon was fourth, followed by Hornish Jr., who finished one lap behind the leaders, having stalled his engine on pit road in the closing laps. Scott Sharp was the sixth-place finisher, and early leader Castroneves wound up seventh. Simmons, Scheckter, and Buddy Rice finished eighth through tenth; all other drivers ended the race two or more laps behind.

There were nine lead changes in the race; five drivers reached the front of the field. Wheldon's total of 126 laps led was the highest of any competitor. Kanaan led four different times, for a total of 26 laps. The victory was the eighth of Kanaan's IRL career and the first of a series-high five wins he posted in the 2007 season.

=== Post-race ===
In interviews after the race, Kanaan credited his team's fuel strategy for being the main factor in his victory. During many of the laps that Wheldon led, Kanaan drafted behind him to use less fuel than normal, and he was able to stay on the track longer than other drivers as a result. He said of the strategy, "that's what probably gave me the win." On the other hand, Wheldon later said that his radio problem forced more "conservative" pit stop planning by himself and his team. Third-place finisher Franchitti said: "We had to take the gamble to try to get the win. I thought we had as good a car as TK (Tony Kanaan) and Dan (Wheldon). I think I could have hung with them, but I don't think I could have caught up with them." Matsuura admitted his first-lap accident was his fault and apologized to his Japanese fans. After his accident on the 135th lap, Andretti was taken to the track's infield care center for a precautionary X-ray scan of his right shoulder which showed a negative result. He said that he struggled with controlling his car but was happy. With his second-place finish, Wheldon gained the season points lead with 118, three ahead of Kanaan and six in front of Dixon. The standings were closely contested, with the top six drivers separated by 27 points.

=== Race classification ===
Race results
Pos	No.	Driver	Team	Laps	Time/retired	Grid	Laps led	Points
1	11	Tony Kanaan (BRA)	Andretti Green Racing	200	1:52:23.2574	3	26	50
2	10	Dan Wheldon (UK)	Chip Ganassi Racing	200	+ 0.4828	2	126	43^{1}
3	27	Dario Franchitti (UK)	Andretti Green Racing	200	+ 11.5538	7	0	35
4	9	Scott Dixon (NZL)	Chip Ganassi Racing	200	+ 13.0623	6	2	32
5	6	Sam Hornish Jr. (USA)	Team Penske	199	Running	5	3	30
6	8	Scott Sharp (USA)	Rahal Letterman Racing	199	Running	12	0	28
7	3	Hélio Castroneves (BRA)	Team Penske	199	Running	1	43	26
8	17	Jeff Simmons (USA)	Rahal Letterman Racing	199	Running	17	0	24
9	2	Tomas Scheckter (RSA)	Vision Racing	199	Running	8	0	22
10	15	Buddy Rice (USA)	Dreyer & Reinbold Racing	199	Running	11	0	20
11	7	Danica Patrick (USA)	Andretti Green Racing	198	Running	4	0	19
12	14	Darren Manning (UK)	A.J. Foyt Racing	198	Running	18	0	18
13	22	A. J. Foyt IV (USA)	Vision Racing	197	Running	14	0	17
14	5	Sarah Fisher (USA)	Dreyer & Reinbold Racing	197	Running	15	0	16
15	20	Ed Carpenter (USA)	Vision Racing	192	Running	16	0	15
16	26	Marco Andretti (USA)	Andretti Green Racing	134	Contact	10	0	14
17	4	Vítor Meira (BRA)	Panther Racing	50	Handling	13	0	13
18	55	Kosuke Matsuura (JPN)	Panther Racing	0	Contact	9	0	12
^{1} Includes three bonus points for leading the most laps

== Standings after the race ==
Drivers' Championship standings
Pos	+/–	Driver	Points
1	1	Dan Wheldon (UK)	118
2	2	Tony Kanaan (BRA)	115
3	2	Scott Dixon (NZL)	112
4	2	Hélio Castroneves (BRA)	101
5	1	Dario Franchitti (UK)	91
Sources:

- Note: Only the top five positions are included for the drivers' standings.

Previous race: 2007 Honda Grand Prix of St. Petersburg	IndyCar Series; 2007 season	Next race: 2007 Kansas Lottery Indy 300
Previous race: 2006 Indy Japan 300	Indy Japan 300	Next race: 2008 Indy Japan 300
