= 2007 Honda Grand Prix of St. Petersburg =

(United States) 2007 St. Petersburg
Race details
- 2nd round of the 2007 IndyCar Series season
- Date: April 1, 2007
- Official name: Honda Grand Prix of St. Petersburg
- Location: Streets of St. Petersburg
- Course: Temporary Street Circuit; 1.800 mi / 2.897 km
- Distance: 100 laps 180.000 mi / 289.682 km
- Weather: 79 °F (26 °C), Sunny

Pole position
- Driver: (Brazil) Hélio Castroneves (Team Penske)
- Time: 1:01.6839

Fastest lap
- Driver: (United States) Marco Andretti (Andretti Green Racing)
- Time: 1:02.965 (on lap 86 of 100)

Podium
- First: (Brazil) Hélio Castroneves (Team Penske)
- Second: (New Zealand) Scott Dixon (Chip Ganassi Racing)
- Third: (Brazil) Tony Kanaan (Andretti Green Racing)

Chronology
Previous	Next
2006	2008

The 2007 Honda Grand Prix of St. Petersburg was the second round of the 2007 IndyCar Series season. It took place on April 1, 2007.

== Results ==
Pos.	No.	Driver	Team	Laps	Time/Retired	Grid	Laps Led	Points
1	3	(Brazil) Hélio Castroneves	Team Penske	100	2:01:07.3512	1	95	50+3
2	9	(New Zealand) Scott Dixon	Chip Ganassi Racing	100	+0.6007	4	0	40
3	11	(Brazil) Tony Kanaan	Andretti Green Racing	100	+7.9130	6	0	35
4	26	(United States) Marco Andretti	Andretti Green Racing	100	+13.5090	2	3	32
5	27	(United Kingdom) Dario Franchitti	Andretti Green Racing	100	+14.5935	3	0	30
6	2	(South Africa) Tomas Scheckter	Vision Racing	100	+25.3109	8	0	28
7	6	(United States) Sam Hornish Jr.	Team Penske	100	+27.0722	7	0	26
8	7	(United States) Danica Patrick	Andretti Green Racing	100	+28.0378	11	0	24
9	10	(United Kingdom) Dan Wheldon	Chip Ganassi Racing	100	+34.3899	14	2	22
10	15	(United States) Buddy Rice	Dreyer & Reinbold Racing	100	+46.9180	13	0	20
11	8	(United States) Scott Sharp	Rahal Letterman Racing	100	+48.0980	15	0	19
12	14	(United Kingdom) Darren Manning	A. J. Foyt Racing	99	+1 Lap	5	0	18
13	22	(United States) A. J. Foyt IV	Vision Racing	98	+2 Laps	17	0	17
14	17	(United States) Jeff Simmons	Rahal Letterman Racing	97	+3 Laps	12	0	16
15	5	(United States) Sarah Fisher	Dreyer & Reinbold Racing	97	+3 Laps	18	0	15
16	4	(Brazil) Vítor Meira	Panther Racing	96	+4 Laps	9	0	14
17	55	(Japan) Kosuke Matsuura	Panther Racing	83	+17 Laps	10	0	13
18	20	(United States) Ed Carpenter	Vision Racing	45	Accident	16	0	12

Preceded by XM Satellite Radio Indy 300	IRL IndyCar Series round 2; 2007	Succeeded by Indy Japan 300
