= 2007 Motorola Indy 300 =

IndyCar layout of Infineon Raceway (2005-2011)

The 2007 Motorola Indy 300 was a race in the 2007 IRL IndyCar Series, held at Infineon Raceway. It was held over the weekend of 24 -August 26, 2007, as the fifteenth round of the seventeen-race calendar.

== Classification ==
Fin. Pos	Car No.	Driver	Team	Laps	Time/Retired	Grid	Laps Led	Points
1	9	(New Zealand) Scott Dixon	Chip Ganassi Racing	80	1:51:58.5533	5	15	50
2	3	(Brazil) Hélio Castroneves	Team Penske	80	+0.5449	4	0	40
3	27	(United Kingdom) Dario Franchitti	Andretti Green Racing	80	+8.3814	1	62	35+3
4	11	(Brazil) Tony Kanaan	Andretti Green Racing	80	+8.9864	3	1	32
5	6	(United States) Sam Hornish Jr.	Team Penske	80	+9.9473	6	0	30
6	7	(United States) Danica Patrick	Andretti Green Racing	80	+10.3725	2	0	28
7	10	(United Kingdom) Dan Wheldon	Chip Ganassi Racing	80	+10.8098	10	0	26
8	2	(South Africa) Tomas Scheckter	Vision Racing	80	+12.6855	11	0	24
9	4	(Brazil) Vítor Meira	Panther Racing	80	+12.9782	13	0	22
10	55	(Japan) Kosuke Matsuura	Panther Racing	80	+14.9708	12	0	20
11	15	(United States) Buddy Rice	Dreyer & Reinbold Racing	79	+1 Lap	9	0	19
12	14	(United Kingdom) Darren Manning	A.J. Foyt Racing	79	+1 Lap	16	0	18
13	20	(United States) Ed Carpenter	Vision Racing	79	+1 Lap	14	0	17
14	8	(United States) Scott Sharp	Rahal Letterman Racing	79	+1 Lap	17	0	16
15	22	(United States) A. J. Foyt IV	Vision Racing	71	Accident	15	0	15
16	26	(United States) Marco Andretti	Andretti Green Racing	68	Accident	8	2	14
17	5	(United States) Sarah Fisher	Dreyer & Reinbold Racing	28	Mechanical	18	0	13
18	17	(United States) Ryan Hunter-Reay	Rahal Letterman Racing	5	Handling	7	0	12
Lead changes: 10 between 4 drivers
