= 2005 IndyCar Series =

American auto racing season

2005 IndyCar season
- IndyCar Series

Season
- Races: 17
- Start date: March 6
- End date: October 16

Awards
- Drivers' champion: (United Kingdom) Dan Wheldon
- Manufacturers' Cup: (Japan) Honda
- Rookie of the Year: (United States) Danica Patrick
- Indianapolis 500 winner: (United Kingdom) Dan Wheldon

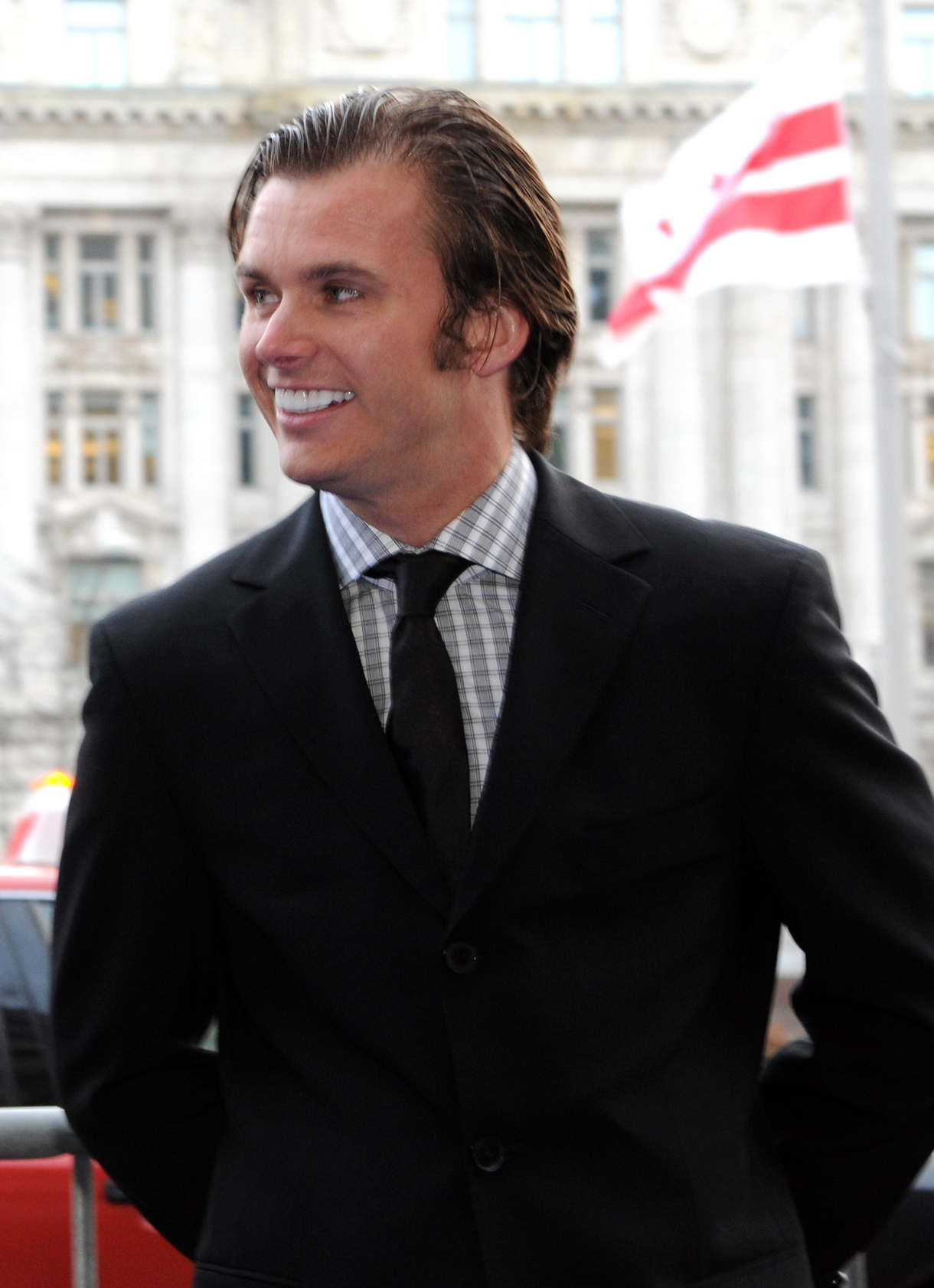
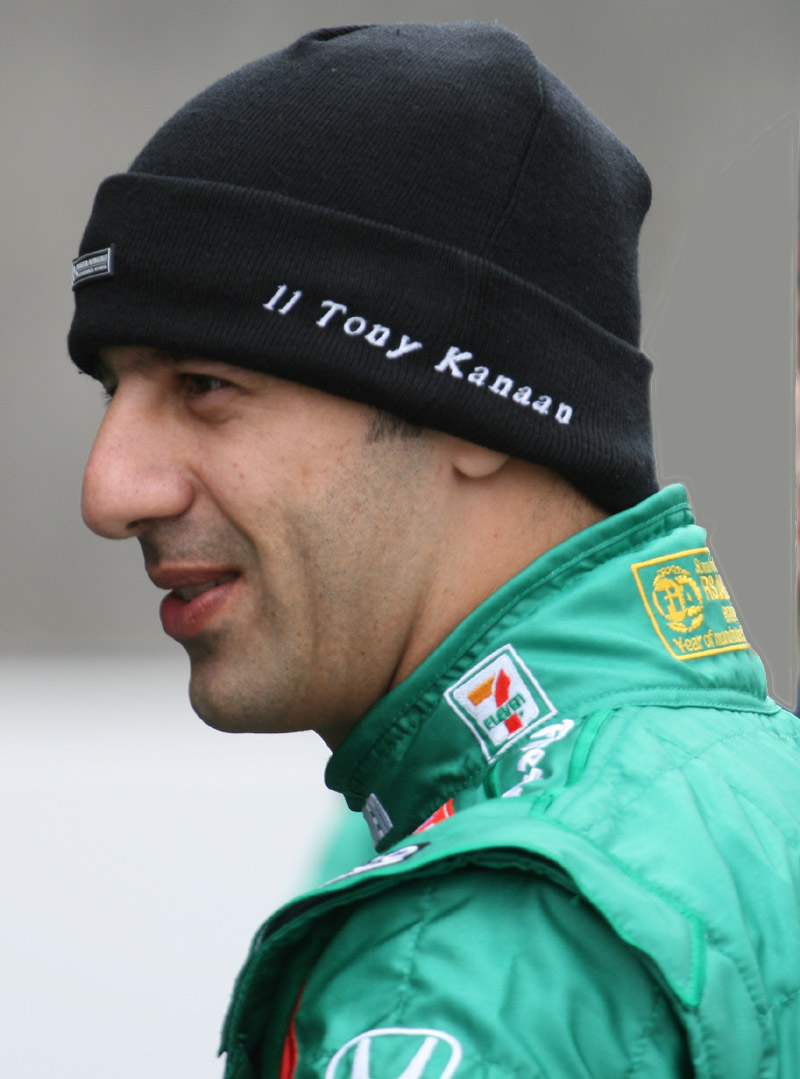
Dan Wheldon (left) won the drivers champion in the Indianapolis 500, while Tony Kanaan (right) finished second in points.

The 2005 IRL IndyCar Series began on Sunday, March 6 and ended on Sunday, October 16. The season, which consisted of 17 races, was the 10th season of the IRL IndyCar Series since it split from CART in 1995.

Dan Wheldon was the dominant driver in the series in 2005, winning six races, including the 89th running of the Indianapolis 500, setting the record for most victories in an IRL season. However, the big story of the season was that of Rahal Letterman Racing's Danica Patrick, the fourth woman to compete in the Indy 500 and the first to lead a lap. She would eventually wind up in fourth. Danica's presence was a boost to the IRL's television ratings. The Indy 500's ratings were up 40% from the year before and subsequent races also saw a boost in ratings. Dan Wheldon also became the first IndyCar driver to win the Indianapolis 500 and IndyCar Series overall driver's title, respectively, in the same season since Jacques Villeneuve in the 1995 PPG IndyCar World Series season and also the first in the Indy Racing League era.

The season was the first to introduce road courses and street circuits when the series held races at the Streets of St. Petersburg, Infineon Raceway and Watkins Glen International, where the series was previously known to have held events exclusively on oval tracks since the IRL/CART split in 1996. Wheldon also became the series' first road/street course winner when he won in St. Petersburg.

The season was also the last for Chevrolet in the series, who confirmed in August that they would not return to the IRL (Chevrolet returned in 2012). At the start of the season, only Panther Racing's Tomas Scheckter and Tomáš Enge raced Chevrolet powered cars (although A. J. Foyt IV also started racing for Chevy beginning with the AMBER Alert Portal Indy 300 at Kentucky). The manufacturer situation within the IRL was the hot issue during the second half of the season and continued into the off-season. Toyota announced that they would leave the series shortly after the 2005 season ended, leaving Honda as the only remaining manufacturer in the IRL. Honda extended their engine supply contract through 2009, despite expressly saying that they did not wish to be IRL's only supplier. The IRL announced that they extended their chassis supply contract with Panoz and Dallara through 2006.

== Rule changes for 2005 ==
- A mandated switch to the single-point re-fueling systems used by some teams in 2004. The IRL only approved one type of fueling probe and buckeye, and these only work as a single-point system. In the approved system, two hoses coming from the storage tank combined at the fueling mechanism, handled by the fueler. The crew member previously responsible for the operation of the vent and jack was now free to operate only the jack.
- Cars raced on all ovals in the same configuration introduced at the 88th Indianapolis 500 in May 2004 with minimal aerodynamic changes. The changes were limited to specific areas of the underwing and sidepods. The IRL required teams to use the same engine cover as the previous year without modifications.

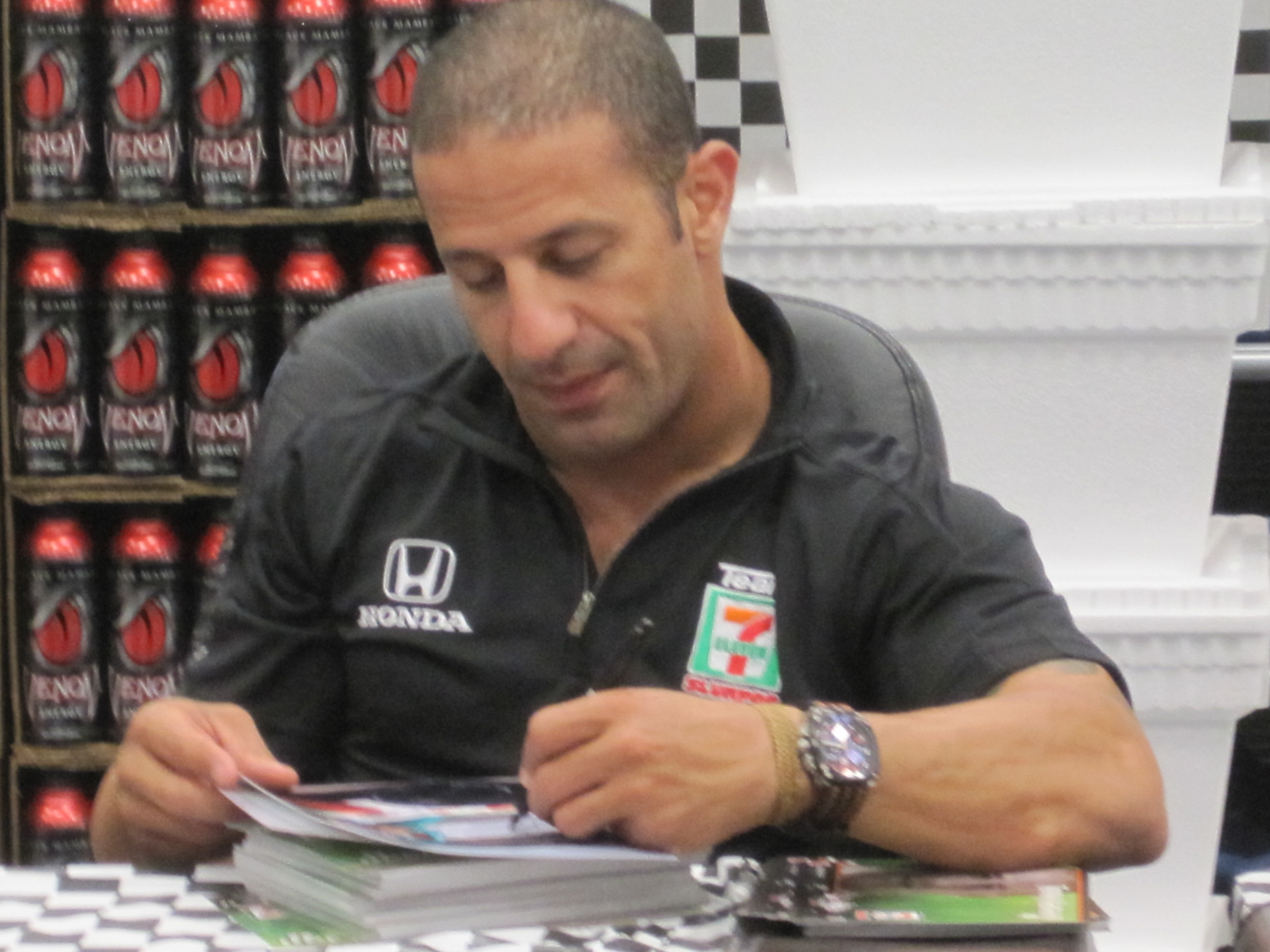
Defending champion Tony Kanaan finished second in the championship.

- Teams were allowed to change engines prior to qualifying without penalty at the following events, which were scheduled to be three-day events: Homestead, St. Petersburg, Motegi, Texas, Milwaukee, Infineon, Watkins Glen, and California.
- The amount of methanol that teams were allowed to have in their trackside tanks was changed. Teams were allowed to carry 85 gallons for 187.5-mile races, 90 gallons for 200-mile events, 100 gallons for 225-mile events, 125 gallons for 260-mile races, 135 gallons for 300-mile events, 175 gallons for 400-mile events and 225 gallons for 500-mile events.
- The mandatory minimum weight of cars was 1,600 pounds, 75 pounds heavier than the oval minimum weight. The additional weight was attributed to the brake system, which consisted of an aluminum brake caliper, steel rotor and pad as specified by the IRL, as well as the limited slip differential in the gearbox.
- For the first time Firestone introduced the treaded rain tires only for road and street courses races if in case of rain weather.

== Confirmed entries ==
Team	Chassis	Engine	No	Drivers	Rounds
A. J. Foyt Enterprises	Dallara; Panoz (Note: Used by A. J. Foyt IV in St. Petersburg and by Felipe Giaffone.)	Toyota; Chevrolet (Note: Used from Kentucky onwards.)	14	(United States) A. J. Foyt IV	1–13, 15, 17
A. J. Foyt Enterprises	Dallara; Panoz	Toyota; Chevrolet	14	(United States) Jeff Bucknum (R)	14, 16
A. J. Foyt Enterprises	Dallara; Panoz	Toyota; Chevrolet	41	(United States) Larry Foyt (R)	5
A. J. Foyt Enterprises	Dallara; Panoz	Toyota; Chevrolet	48	(Brazil) Felipe Giaffone (Note: Replaced Scott Mayer, who failed to pass his rookie test.)	5
Aguri-Fernández Racing; Delphi Fernández Racing	Panoz	Honda	5	(Mexico) Adrián Fernández	5
Aguri-Fernández Racing; Delphi Fernández Racing	Panoz	Honda	8	(United States) Scott Sharp	All
Aguri-Fernández Racing; Delphi Fernández Racing	Panoz	Honda	55	(Japan) Kosuke Matsuura	All
Andretti Green Racing	Dallara	Honda	7	(United States) Bryan Herta	All
Andretti Green Racing	Dallara	Honda	11	(Brazil) Tony Kanaan	All
Andretti Green Racing	Dallara	Honda	26	(United Kingdom) Dan Wheldon	All
Andretti Green Racing	Dallara	Honda	27	(United Kingdom) Dario Franchitti	All
Cheever Racing	Dallara	Toyota	51	(United States) Alex Barron	All
Cheever Racing	Dallara	Toyota	83	(Canada) Patrick Carpentier	All
CURB/Agajanian/Beck Motorsports	Dallara	Chevrolet	98	(Netherlands) Arie Luyendyk Jr. (R)	5
Dreyer & Reinbold Racing	Dallara	Honda	24	(United States) Roger Yasukawa	All
Dreyer & Reinbold Racing	Dallara	Honda	44	(United States) Jeff Bucknum (R)	4–5
Dreyer & Reinbold Racing	Dallara	Honda	44	(Brazil) Thiago Medeiros (R)	17
Hemelgarn Racing	Dallara	Toyota	91	(United States) Paul Dana (R)	1–2, 4
Hemelgarn Racing	Dallara	Toyota	91	(United States) Jimmy Kite	5–13, 15, 17
Marlboro Team Penske	Dallara	Toyota	3	(Brazil) Hélio Castroneves	All
Marlboro Team Penske	Dallara	Toyota	6	(United States) Sam Hornish Jr.	All
Newman/Haas Racing	Panoz	Honda	36	(Brazil) Bruno Junqueira	5
Newman/Haas Racing	Panoz	Honda	37	(France) Sébastien Bourdais	5
Panther Racing	Dallara	Chevrolet	2	(Czech Republic) Tomáš Enge (R)	1–9, 12–17
Panther Racing	Dallara	Chevrolet	2	(United States) Buddy Lazier	10
Panther Racing	Dallara	Chevrolet	2	(United States) Townsend Bell	11
Panther Racing	Dallara	Chevrolet	4	(South Africa) Tomas Scheckter	All
Panther Racing	Dallara	Chevrolet	95	(United States) Buddy Lazier	5, 9, 11–12, 15
Playa del Racing	Panoz	Toyota	21	(United States) Jaques Lazier	5
Rahal Letterman Racing	Panoz	Honda	15	(United States) Buddy Rice	1–4, 6–17
Rahal Letterman Racing	Panoz	Honda	15	(Sweden) Kenny Bräck	5
Rahal Letterman Racing	Panoz	Honda	16	(United States) Danica Patrick (R)	All
Rahal Letterman Racing	Panoz	Honda	17	(Brazil) Vítor Meira	All
Roth Racing	Dallara	Chevrolet	25	(Canada) Marty Roth (R)	5
Sam Schmidt Motorsports	Panoz	Chevrolet	70	(United States) Richie Hearn	5
Target Chip Ganassi Racing	Dallara	Toyota	9	(New Zealand) Scott Dixon	4
Target Chip Ganassi Racing	Panoz	Toyota	9	(New Zealand) Scott Dixon	1–3, 5–17
Target Chip Ganassi Racing	Panoz	Toyota	10	(United Kingdom) Darren Manning	1–10
Target Chip Ganassi Racing	Panoz	Toyota	10	(United States) Jaques Lazier	11–13, 15, 17
Target Chip Ganassi Racing	Panoz	Toyota	10	(Italy) Giorgio Pantano (R)	14, 16
Target Chip Ganassi Racing	Panoz	Toyota	33	(Australia) Ryan Briscoe (R)	1–15
Vision Racing	Dallara	Toyota	20	(United States) Ed Carpenter	All
Vision Racing	Dallara	Toyota	22	(United States) Jeff Ward	5

== Schedule ==
Icon	Legend
O	Oval/Speedway
R	Road course
S	Street circuit

Rnd	Date	Race Name	Track	Location
1	March 6	Toyota Indy 300	O Homestead-Miami Speedway	Homestead, Florida
2	March 19	XM Satellite Radio Indy 200	O Phoenix International Raceway	Phoenix, Arizona
3	April 3	Honda Grand Prix of St. Petersburg	S Streets of St. Petersburg	St. Petersburg, Florida
4	April 30	Indy Japan 300	O Twin Ring Motegi	Motegi, Japan
5	May 29	89th Indianapolis 500	O Indianapolis Motor Speedway	Speedway, Indiana
6	June 11	Bombardier Learjet 500	O Texas Motor Speedway	Fort Worth, Texas
7	June 25	SunTrust Indy Challenge	O Richmond International Raceway	Richmond, Virginia
8	July 3	Argent Mortgage Indy 300	O Kansas Speedway	Kansas City, Kansas
9	July 16	Firestone Indy 200	O Nashville Superspeedway	Lebanon, Tennessee
10	July 24	ABC Supply Company A. J. Foyt 225	O The Milwaukee Mile	West Allis, Wisconsin
11	July 31	Firestone Indy 400	O Michigan International Speedway	Brooklyn, Michigan
12	August 14	AMBER Alert Portal Indy 300	O Kentucky Speedway	Sparta, Kentucky
13	August 21	Honda Indy 225	O Pikes Peak International Raceway	Fountain, Colorado
14	August 28	Argent Mortgage Indy Grand Prix	R Infineon Raceway	Sonoma, California
15	September 11	Peak Antifreeze Indy 300	O Chicagoland Speedway	Joliet, Illinois
16	September 25	Watkins Glen Indy Grand Prix	R Watkins Glen International	Watkins Glen, New York
17	October 16	Toyota Indy 400	O California Speedway	Fontana, California

== Results ==
Rd.	Race	Pole position	Fastest lap	Most laps led	Race winner			
Rd.	Race	Pole position	Fastest lap	Most laps led	Driver	Team	Chassis	Engine
1	Homestead	(South Africa) Tomas Scheckter	(United States) Buddy Rice	(United Kingdom) Dan Wheldon	(United Kingdom) Dan Wheldon	Andretti Green Racing	Dallara	Honda
2	Phoenix	(United States) Bryan Herta	(United Kingdom) Dario Franchitti	(United Kingdom) Dan Wheldon	(United States) Sam Hornish Jr.	Team Penske	Dallara	Toyota
3	St. Petersburg	(United States) Bryan Herta	(United Kingdom) Dario Franchitti	(Australia) Ryan Briscoe	(United Kingdom) Dan Wheldon	Andretti Green Racing	Dallara	Honda
4	Motegi	(United States) Sam Hornish Jr.	(United Kingdom) Dan Wheldon	(United Kingdom) Dario Franchitti	(United Kingdom) Dan Wheldon	Andretti Green Racing	Dallara	Honda
5	Indianapolis	(Brazil) Tony Kanaan	(Brazil) Tony Kanaan	(United States) Sam Hornish Jr.	(United Kingdom) Dan Wheldon	Andretti Green Racing	Dallara	Honda
6	Texas	(South Africa) Tomas Scheckter	(Czech Republic) Tomáš Enge	(South Africa) Tomas Scheckter	(South Africa) Tomas Scheckter	Panther Racing	Dallara	Chevrolet
7	Richmond	(United States) Sam Hornish Jr.	(Japan) Kosuke Matsuura	(Brazil) Hélio Castroneves	(Brazil) Hélio Castroneves	Team Penske	Dallara	Toyota
8	Kansas	(United States) Danica Patrick	(Australia) Ryan Briscoe	(United Kingdom) Dan Wheldon	(Brazil) Tony Kanaan	Andretti Green Racing	Dallara	Honda
9	Nashville	(South Africa) Tomas Scheckter	(United States) Scott Sharp	(Brazil) Tony Kanaan	(United Kingdom) Dario Franchitti	Andretti Green Racing	Dallara	Honda
10	Milwaukee	(United States) Sam Hornish Jr.	(South Africa) Tomas Scheckter	(United States) Sam Hornish Jr.	(United States) Sam Hornish Jr.	Team Penske	Dallara	Toyota
11	Michigan	(United States) Bryan Herta	(United States) Townsend Bell	(United States) Bryan Herta	(United States) Bryan Herta	Andretti Green Racing	Dallara	Honda
12	Kentucky	(United States) Danica Patrick	(United States) Danica Patrick	(United Kingdom) Dan Wheldon	(United States) Scott Sharp	Fernández Racing	Panoz	Honda
13	Pikes Peak	(Brazil) Hélio Castroneves	(United Kingdom) Dario Franchitti	(United States) Sam Hornish Jr.	(United Kingdom) Dan Wheldon	Andretti Green Racing	Dallara	Honda
14	Sonoma	(Australia) Ryan Briscoe	(Brazil) Tony Kanaan	(Brazil) Tony Kanaan	(Brazil) Tony Kanaan	Andretti Green Racing	Dallara	Honda
15	Chicagoland	(United States) Danica Patrick	(United Kingdom) Dario Franchitti	(United Kingdom) Dan Wheldon	(United Kingdom) Dan Wheldon	Andretti Green Racing	Dallara	Honda
16	Watkins Glen	(Brazil) Hélio Castroneves	(New Zealand) Scott Dixon	(New Zealand) Scott Dixon	(New Zealand) Scott Dixon	Chip Ganassi Racing	Panoz	Toyota
17	California	(United Kingdom) Dario Franchitti	(United Kingdom) Dan Wheldon	(South Africa) Tomas Scheckter	(United Kingdom) Dario Franchitti	Andretti Green Racing	Dallara	Honda

== Race summaries ==
=== Toyota Indy 300 ===
On March 6, at Homestead-Miami Speedway, Dan Wheldon led 158 of 200 laps to get the victory. Tomas Scheckter sat on the pole.

Top Ten Results

1. 26- Dan Wheldon
2. 6- Sam Hornish Jr.
3. 11- Tony Kanaan
4. 17- Vítor Meira
5. 3- Hélio Castroneves
6. 10- Darren Manning
7. 83- Patrick Carpentier
8. 51- Alex Barron
9. 14- A. J. Foyt IV
10. 91- Paul Dana

=== XM Satellite Radio Indy 200 ===
On March 19, at Phoenix International Raceway, Sam Hornish Jr. won his first race of the season. Bryan Herta sat on the pole. This would be the last time IndyCar would compete at Phoenix until the race was revived in 2016.

Top Ten Results

1. 6- Sam Hornish Jr.
2. 3- Hélio Castroneves
3. 11- Tony Kanaan
4. 27- Dario Franchitti
5. 8- Scott Sharp
6. 26- Dan Wheldon
7. 7- Bryan Herta
8. 10- Darren Manning
9. 83- Patrick Carpentier
10. 55- Kosuke Matsuura

=== Honda Grand Prix of St. Petersburg ===
On April 3, the Honda Grand Prix on the Streets of St. Petersburg (Florida) marked the first non-oval event for the IndyCar Series. Dan Wheldon won his second race of the year. Bryan Herta sat on the pole. Andretti Green Racing drivers swept the top 4 finishing positions.

Top Ten Results

1. 26- Dan Wheldon
2. 11- Tony Kanaan
3. 27- Dario Franchitti
4. 7- Bryan Herta
5. 17- Vítor Meira
6. 9- Scott Dixon
7. 15- Buddy Rice
8. 83- Patrick Carpentier
9. 10- Darren Manning
10. 51- Alex Barron

=== Indy Japan 300 ===
On April 30, at Twin Ring Motegi in Motegi, Tochigi, Japan, Dan Wheldon won his third race of the season. Sam Hornish Jr. sat on the pole.

Top Ten Results

1. 26- Dan Wheldon
2. 8- Scott Sharp
3. 15- Buddy Rice
4. 16- Danica Patrick
5. 7- Bryan Herta
6. 11- Tony Kanaan
7. 6- Sam Hornish Jr.
8. 10- Darren Manning
9. 55- Kosuke Matsuura
10. 4- Tomas Scheckter

=== 89th Indianapolis 500 ===
On May 29, at the Indianapolis Motor Speedway, Dan Wheldon won his first Indy 500 and his fourth race of the season. However, the focus of the race was on Danica Patrick who led 19 laps, the first time a woman has ever led a lap at Indy. Tony Kanaan sat on the pole.

Top Ten Results

1. 26- Dan Wheldon
2. 17- Vítor Meira
3. 7- Bryan Herta
4. 16- Danica Patrick
5. 95- Buddy Lazier
6. 27- Dario Franchitti
7. 8- Scott Sharp
8. 11- Tony Kanaan
9. 3- Hélio Castroneves
10. 33- Ryan Briscoe

=== Bombardier Learjet 500 ===
On June 11, at Texas Motor Speedway, Tomas Scheckter won his first race of the season, sitting on the pole and leading for 119 of 200 laps. This was the last victory for Chevrolet engine in the series before the temporary withdrawal until 2011.

Top Ten Results

1. 4- Tomas Scheckter
2. 6- Sam Hornish Jr.
3. 11- Tony Kanaan
4. 8- Scott Sharp
5. 3- Hélio Castroneves
6. 26- Dan Wheldon
7. 55- Kosuke Matsuura
8. 27- Dario Franchitti
9. 17- Vítor Meira
10. 7- Bryan Herta

=== SunTrust Indy Challenge ===
On June 25, at Richmond International Raceway, Hélio Castroneves won his first race of the season. Sam Hornish Jr. sat on the pole.

Top Ten Results

1. 3- Hélio Castroneves
2. 27- Dario Franchitti
3. 83- Patrick Carpentier
4. 4- Tomas Scheckter
5. 26- Dan Wheldon
6. 51- Alex Barron
7. 2- Tomáš Enge
8. 7- Bryan Herta
9. 55- Kosuke Matsuura
10. 16- Danica Patrick

=== Argent Mortgage Indy 300 ===
On July 3, at Kansas Speedway, Tony Kanaan won by a fraction of a second over Dan Wheldon and Vítor Meira. Danica Patrick won her first career IndyCar Series pole.

Top Ten Results

1. 11- Tony Kanaan
2. 26- Dan Wheldon
3. 17- Vítor Meira
4. 27- Dario Franchitti
5. 4- Tomas Scheckter
6. 8- Scott Sharp
7. 10- Darren Manning
8. 3- Hélio Castroneves
9. 16- Danica Patrick
10. 15- Buddy Rice

=== Firestone Indy 200 ===
On July 16 at Nashville Superspeedway, Dario Franchitti won, leading 74 of 200 laps. Tomas Scheckter sat on the pole. Tomas Enge fractured his back in a lap 27 crash in turn 1 and would miss the next 2 races.

Top Ten Results

1. 27- Dario Franchitti
2. 6- Sam Hornish Jr.
3. 83- Patrick Carpentier
4. 8- Scott Sharp
5. 3- Hélio Castroneves
6. 9- Scott Dixon
7. 16- Danica Patrick
8. 33- Ryan Briscoe
9. 95- Buddy Lazier
10. 20- Ed Carpenter

=== ABC Supply Company A. J. Foyt 225 ===
On July 24 at The Milwaukee Mile, Sam Hornish Jr. won from the pole, leading 123 of 225 laps.

Top Ten Results

1. 6- Sam Hornish Jr.
2. 27- Dario Franchitti
3. 4- Tomas Scheckter
4. 11- Tony Kanaan
5. 26- Dan Wheldon
6. 7- Bryan Herta
7. 83- Patrick Carpentier
8. 51- Alex Barron
9. 17- Vítor Meira
10. 8- Scott Sharp

=== Firestone Indy 400 ===
On July 31 at Michigan International Speedway, Bryan Herta won from the pole, leading 159 of 200 laps.

Top Ten Results

1. 7- Bryan Herta
2. 26- Dan Wheldon
3. 4- Tomas Scheckter
4. 11- Tony Kanaan
5. 6- Sam Hornish Jr.
6. 15- Buddy Lazier
7. 8- Scott Sharp
8. 27- Dario Franchitti
9. 83- Patrick Carpentier
10. 33- Ryan Briscoe

=== AMBER Alert Portal Indy 300 ===
On August 14 at Kentucky Speedway, Scott Sharp won for the first time since 2003 at Twin Ring Motegi, holding off Vítor Meira for the last laps to win. Danica Patrick sat on the pole for the second time in the season after rain washed out qualifying and the starting grid was determined by the fastest times in practice. Tomas Enge returned from injury to finish 11th.

Top Ten Results

1. 8- Scott Sharp
2. 17- Vítor Meira
3. 26- Dan Wheldon
4. 51- Alex Barron
5. 3- Hélio Castroneves
6. 95- Buddy Lazier
7. 6- Sam Hornish Jr.
8. 55- Kosuke Matsuura
9. 14- A. J. Foyt IV
10. 91- Jimmy Kite

=== Honda Indy 225 ===
On August 21 at Pikes Peak International Raceway, Penske Racing teammates Hélio Castroneves and Sam Hornish Jr. started 1–2. Dan Wheldon won his fifth race of the season, tying Sam Hornish Jr.'s record for most victories in a season. This was the final IRL race at PPIR as the track was sold to International Speedway Corporation for intent to be shut down as ISC looked for a new Denver-area circuit. However, plans failed and the track was sold for testing purposes, but cannot be used for competition per ISC regulations.

Top Ten Results

1. 26- Dan Wheldon
2. 6- Sam Hornish Jr.
3. 11- Tony Kanaan
4. 3- Hélio Castroneves
5. 17- Vítor Meira
6. 2- Tomáš Enge
7. 27- Dario Franchitti
8. 16- Danica Patrick
9. 8- Scott Sharp
10. 83- Patrick Carpentier

=== Argent Mortgage Indy Grand Prix ===
On August 28 at the circuit's inaugural race at Infineon Raceway, Tony Kanaan won the race, taking the lead on lap 52 from points leader Dan Wheldon, who was hampered by fuel problems all day and finished out of the race in 18th. Ryan Briscoe sat on the pole, but caused a three-car accident on lap 20 that also eliminated Hélio Castroneves and Danica Patrick from the race.

Top Ten Results

1. 11- Tony Kanaan
2. 15- Buddy Rice
3. 51- Alex Barron
4. 83- Patrick Carpentier
5. 2- Tomáš Enge
6. 55- Kosuke Matsuura
7. 9- Scott Dixon
8. 27- Dario Franchitti
9. 17- Vítor Meira
10. 14- Jeff Bucknum

=== Peak Antifreeze Indy 300 ===
On September 11 at Chicagoland Speedway, Dan Wheldon won his sixth race, breaking the all-time record for most wins in an IRL season. Ryan Briscoe originally won the pole but was disqualified for a technical infraction and sent to the back of the grid. The pole winner after this became Danica Patrick for her third (and final) IndyCar pole. Briscoe's weekend got significantly worse as he was involved in a fiery crash with Alex Barron on lap 20. Briscoe was taken by helicopter to a Chicago-area hospital with head and back pain, but was alert. He suffered a concussion, two broken collarbones, a bruised lung and contusions to his arms and legs. The accident resulted in a 16-minute red flag.

Top Ten Results

1. 26- Dan Wheldon
2. 3- Hélio Castroneves
3. 6- Sam Hornish Jr.
4. 4- Tomas Scheckter
5. 11- Tony Kanaan
6. 16- Danica Patrick
7. 17- Vítor Meira
8. 8- Scott Sharp
9. 83- Patrick Carpentier
10. 95- Buddy Lazier

=== Watkins Glen Indy Grand Prix ===
On September 25 at Watkins Glen International, Scott Dixon won his first race since his 2003 IndyCar Series Championship season. Hélio Castroneves sat on the pole. This was the first major open-wheel race at Watkins Glen since 1981 and Dixon's first road course victory. As of 2024, this was the final IndyCar Series victory for Toyota engine to date.

Top Ten Results

1. 9- Scott Dixon
2. 11- Tony Kanaan
3. 27- Dario Franchitti
4. 10- Giorgio Pantano
5. 26- Dan Wheldon
6. 55- Kosuke Matsuura
7. 6- Sam Hornish Jr.
8. 7- Bryan Herta
9. 8- Scott Sharp
10. 83- Patrick Carpentier

=== Toyota Indy 400 ===
On October 16 at California Speedway, Dario Franchitti won his second race of the year over Tony Kanaan by 0.111 s. Chevrolet powered cars finished 7th and 8th in their final IRL race while Toyota powered cars had a best finish of 5th in theirs. IndyCar would not return to this track until 2012.

Last competition victory for Honda in the series until 2012 Indianapolis 500.

Top Ten Results

1. 27- Dario Franchitti
2. 11- Tony Kanaan
3. 17- Vítor Meira
4. 8- Scott Sharp
5. 6- Sam Hornish Jr.
6. 26- Dan Wheldon
7. 4- Tomas Scheckter
8. 2- Tomáš Enge
9. 3- Hélio Castroneves
10. 9- Scott Dixon

== Points standings ==
Pos	Driver	HOM	PHX	STP	MOT	INDY	TMS	RIC	KAN	NSS	MIL	MIS	KEN	PPR	SON	CHI	WGL	CAL	Pts
1	(United Kingdom) Dan Wheldon	1*	6*	1	1	1	6	5	2*	21	5	2	3*	1	18	1*	5	6	628
2	(Brazil) Tony Kanaan	3	3	2	6	**8**	3	19	1	19*	4	4	20	3	1*	5	2	2	548
3	(United States) Sam Hornish Jr.	2	1	15	**7**	23*	2	**18**	12	2	**1***	5	7	2*	17	3	7	5	512
4	(United Kingdom) Dario Franchitti	22	4	3	17*	6	8	2	4	1	2	8	18	7	8	12	3	**1**	498
5	(United States) Scott Sharp	13	5	18	2	7	4	17	6	4	10	7	1	9	12	8	9	4	444
6	(Brazil) Hélio Castroneves	5	2	20	11	9	5	1*	8	5	16	21	5	**4**	21	2	**12**	9	440
7	(Brazil) Vítor Meira	4	11	5	15	2	9	20	3	16	9	14	2	5	9	7	18	3	422
8	(United States) Bryan Herta	14	**7**	**4**	5	3	10	8	15	22	6	**1***	19	12	13	14	8	11	397
9	(South Africa) Tomas Scheckter	**11**	17	17	10	20	**1***	4	5	**17**	3	3	21	14	16	4	20	7*	390
10	(Canada) Patrick Carpentier	7	9	8	13	21	16	3	14	3	7	9	12	10	4	9	10	15	376
11	(United States) Alex Barron	8	13	10	19	13	14	6	13	15	8	11	4	18	3	21	17	14	329
12	(United States) Danica Patrick RY	15	15	12	4	4	13	10	**9**	7	19	20	**16**	8	20	**6**	16	18	325
13	(New Zealand) Scott Dixon	16	12	6	21	24	11	22	18	6	13	19	23	16	7	19	1*	10	321
14	(Japan) Kosuke Matsuura	12	10	13	9	17	7	9	20	14	11	16	8	13	6	23	6	19	320
15	(United States) Buddy Rice	19	22	7	3	Wth	21	11	10	18	17	22	14	11	2	13	19	12	295
16	(Czech Republic) Tomáš Enge R	21	20	16	DNS	19	19	7	11	23			11	6	5	20	13	8	261
17	(United States) Roger Yasukawa	17	18	11	18	18	15	16	22	11	15	18	17	15	11	15	15	16	246
18	(United States) Ed Carpenter	18	16	19	16	11	20	12	17	10	12	23	22	19	15	17	14	20	244
19	(Australia) Ryan Briscoe R	20	19	14*	12	10	12	21	21	8	Wth	10	13	20	**19**	22			232
20	(United States) A. J. Foyt IV	9	14	21	14	28	18	14	16	12	21	12	9	21		11		21	231
21	(United Kingdom) Darren Manning	6	8	9	8	29	17	15	7	20	20								186
22	(United States) Jimmy Kite					32	22	13	19	13	14	13	10	17		18		13	163
23	(United States) Buddy Lazier					5				9	18	6	6			10			140
24	(United States) Jaques Lazier					16						17	15	Wth		16		17	81
25	(United States) Jeff Bucknum R				22	22									10		11		63
26	(Italy) Giorgio Pantano R														14		4		48
27	(United States) Paul Dana R	10	21		20	Wth													44
28	(France) Sébastien Bourdais					12													18
29	(Mexico) Adrián Fernández					14													16
30	(United States) Townsend Bell											15							15
31	(Brazil) Felipe Giaffone					15													15
32	(Brazil) Thiago Medeiros R																	Wth	12
33	(United States) Richie Hearn					25													10
34	(Sweden) Kenny Bräck					26													10
35	(United States) Jeff Ward					27													10
36	(Brazil) Bruno Junqueira					30													10
37	(Canada) Marty Roth R					31													10
38	(United States) Larry Foyt R					33													10
—	(Netherlands) Arie Luyendyk Jr. R					DNQ													0
—	(United States) Scott Mayer R					Wth													0
Pos	Driver	HOM	PHX	STP	MOT	INDY	TMS	RIC	KAN	NSS	MIL	MIS	KEN	PIK	SON	CHI	WGL	CAL	Pts

Color	Result
Gold	Winner
Silver	2nd place
Bronze	3rd place
Green	4th & 5th place
Light Blue	6th–10th place
Dark Blue	Finished (Outside Top 10)
Purple	Did not finish (Ret)
Red	Did not qualify (DNQ)
Brown	Withdrawn (Wth)
Black	Disqualified (DSQ)
White	Did not start (DNS)
Blank	Did not participate (DNP)
Blank	Not competing

**In-line notation**
**Bold**	Pole position
Italics	Ran fastest race lap
*	Led most race laps (3 points)
DNS	Any driver who qualifies but does not start (DNS), earns all the points had they taken part.
RY Rookie of the Year
R Rookie

- Ties in points broken by number of wins, followed by number of 2nds, 3rds, etc., and then by number of pole positions, followed by number of times qualified 2nd, etc.

== See also ==
- 2005 Indianapolis 500
- 2005 Infiniti Pro Series season
- 2005 Champ Car season
- 2005 Toyota Atlantic Championship season
