= A. J. Foyt IV =

American football scout and former racing driver (born 1984)

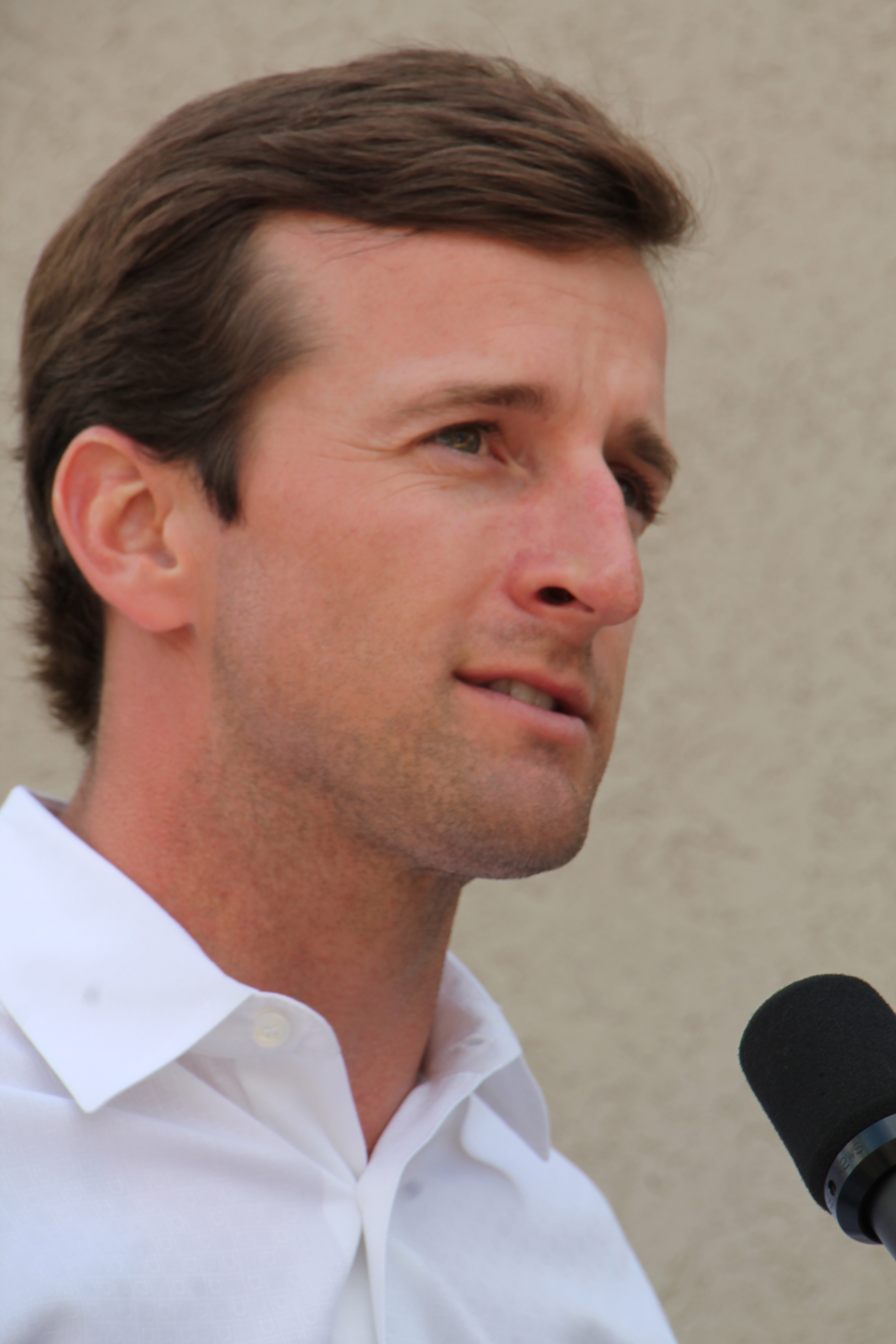
- Foyt at the opening of the Foyt Wine Vault in Speedway, Indiana, in 2015
- Born: Anthony Joseph Foyt IV; May 25, 1984 (age 42); Louisville, Kentucky, U.S.
- Achievements: 2002 Firestone Indy Lights Series champion

IndyCar Series career
- 84 races run over 7 years
- Best finish: 14th (2007)
- First race: 2003 Toyota Indy 300 (Homestead)
- Last race: 2009 Bombardier Learjet 550 (Texas)
Wins	Podiums	Poles
0	1	0

NASCAR O'Reilly Auto Parts Series career
- 11 races run over 2 years
- Best finish: 74th (2006)
- First race: 2005 Sam's Town 250 (Memphis)
- Last race: 2006 O'Reilly 300 (Texas)
Wins	Top tens	Poles
0	0	0
- Football career

Indianapolis Colts
- Title: Scouting assistant

Career history
- Indianapolis Colts (2010–present) Scouting assistant

Anthony Joseph Foyt IV (born May 25, 1984) is an American professional football scout and former racing driver. He is a scouting assistant for the Indianapolis Colts, and drove in the IndyCar Series and briefly the NASCAR Busch Series. He is the third generation of the famous Foyt family and is married to the daughter of late Colts owner Jim Irsay.

Foyt began his career racing karts. He moved up through the open wheel racing ranks, winning the 2002 Infiniti Pro Series. When Foyt made his first Indianapolis 500 race in 2003, he became the youngest driver to start in the event. He continued in IndyCar for two more years until his back was injured at the 2005 Indianapolis 500. Later that season he made several NASCAR Busch Series starts. He was scheduled to continue in the Busch Series in 2006, but the team was bought out and his contract prevented him from driving a non-Dodge car. He returned to IndyCar late that season. He has not raced since 2009, although he drove for his grandfather's A. J. Foyt Enterprises team in trials for the 2010 Indianapolis 500.

== Personal life ==
Foyt was born on May 25, 1984, in Louisville, Kentucky, but lists his hometown as Hockley, Texas, the long-time residence of his grandfather and four-time Indianapolis 500 winner A. J. Foyt, who guided him through much of his career. He is the son of Nancy and thoroughbred trainer Anthony Joseph Foyt III. His cousin, Larry Foyt, also raced cars. He spent much of his early years working with some horses trained by his father at the horse stables of Churchill Downs before his family relocated to Texas when he was six years old. Foyt is a June 2002 graduate of Waller High School.

Foyt appeared in the 2005 film, The Dukes of Hazzard, and is an avid Texas Longhorns fan. He married Indianapolis Colts vice-president Casey Irsay, daughter of team owner Jim Irsay, in July 2009. They have five children.

== Early career in IndyCar ==
Foyt began racing Junior Dragsters as a nine-year-old after a family friend and his uncle purchased a dragster for him and won two championships with it. He progressed to racing karts on paved road courses and dirt tracks where he remained for the following six years, before going on to drive formula race cars in 2001. In 2001, he won six of nine SCCA events to claim the Southwest Regional championship. He finished third in SCCA's national point championships and was the series' Rookie of the Year. That same year, he competed at the World Karting Association's Dirt World Championships at Daytona Beach, Florida and finished second in the Briggs Heavy feature event. Foyt competed in his first USAC Silver Crown event that August. In early 2002, he worked for his grandfather's team A. J. Foyt Enterprises in its race shop and as a pit lane crew member for driver Airton Daré. Foyt was later signed to drive for the team in the newly formed Infiniti Pro Series in mid-year. Foyt won the championship with four wins and four pole positions in seven events.

After passing his rookie test at Texas Motor Speedway on October 31, 2002, allowing him to obtain an Indy Racing League (IRL) racing license, Foyt progressed to Foyt Enterprises' IRL IndyCar Series team for the 2003 season, finishing 21st in the final standings. Foyt currently holds the record for the youngest driver to race in the Indy 500. His rookie race in 2003 occurred on his nineteenth birthday. He took the record from Josele Garza who was slightly over two months older for his first start in 1981.

Foyt continued to struggle in the IndyCar Series, finishing 18th overall in the 2004 season points and falling to twentieth in the 2005 series. In the 2005 Indianapolis 500 Foyt was involved in an accident with Champ Car World Series driver Bruno Junqueira, who sustained a fractured back. The season did not improve as the team switched from Toyota to Chevrolet power mid-season and Foyt was replaced for the late-season road course events by Jeff Bucknum.

== NASCAR ==
In October 2005, Foyt announced that at the end of the 2005 season, he would leave Foyt Enterprises and drive in the NASCAR Busch Series for the No. 38 Akins Motorsports team and was signed as a developmental driver for Evernham Motorsports. He competed in the final four rounds of the 2005 Busch Series in the No. 38 car, and finished outside the top twenty in all of them. After the season, he moved from Texas to Charlotte, North Carolina, and was scheduled to run the entire Busch Series schedule in the No. 38 and be a competitor for the Rookie of the Year award. However, early in the 2006 season, Akins was purchased by Braun Racing, which switched the No. 38 from a Dodge to a Chevrolet. Foyt had an exclusive contract with Dodge that prevented him from continuing with the team. After seven races, he was released by the team due to poor performances, Atkins merging with Braun and changing manufacturers to Chevrolet. Ray Evernham found Foyt employment driving FitzBradshaw Racing's No. 14 car, but Foyt failed to qualify for his first race at Richmond International Raceway with the team and has not attempted a NASCAR race since.

== Return to IndyCar ==
=== 2006 ===
On September 5, 2006, Foyt was tapped by the 2005 IndyCar Championship team, Andretti Green Racing, to replace injured regular AGR driver Dario Franchitti. Foyt drove the No. 27 Dallara Honda in the IRL season's final event at Chicagoland Speedway and finished 14th.

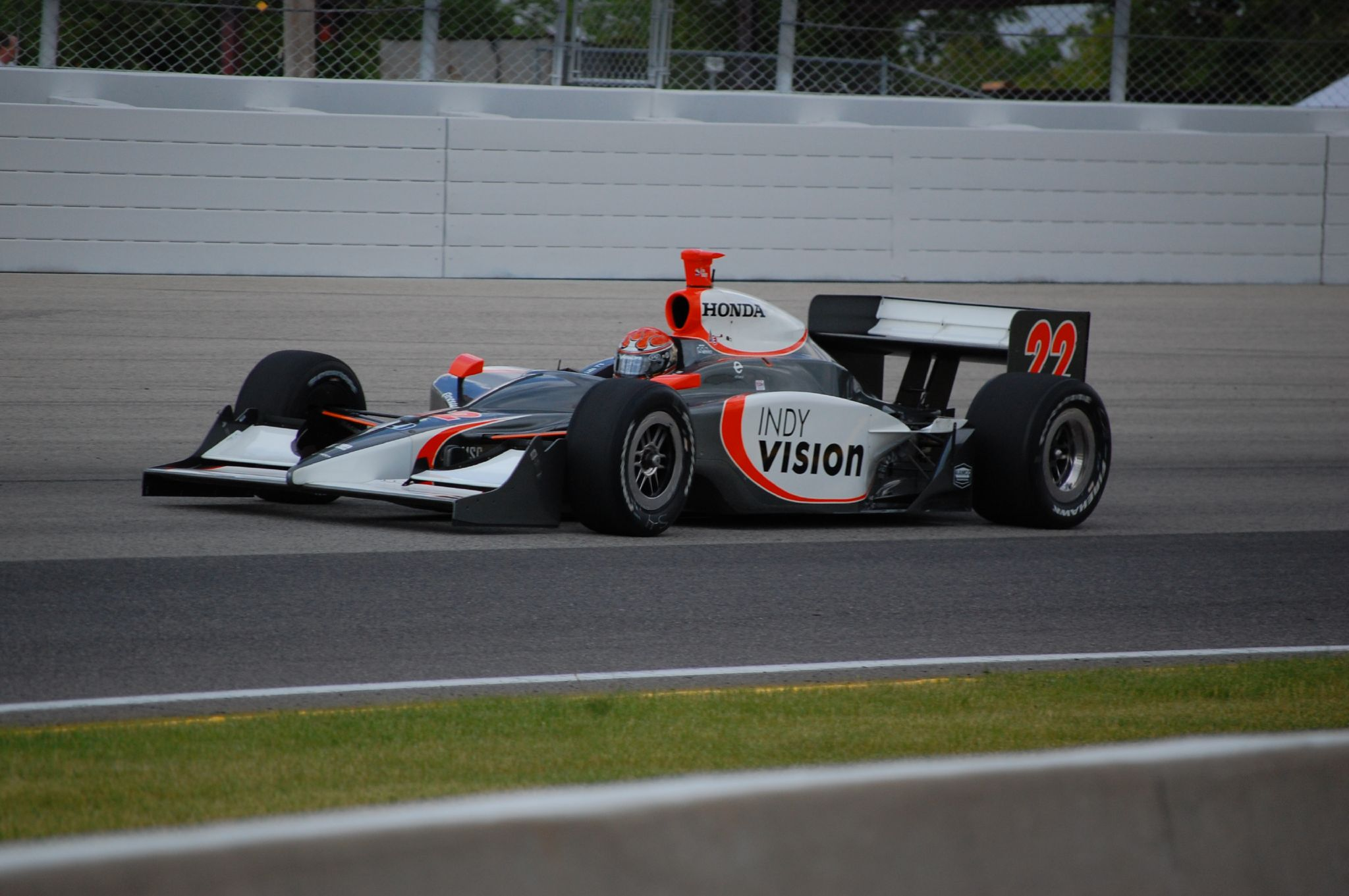
Foyt Driving at the Milwaukee Mile in 2007

=== 2007 ===
In January 2007, Foyt signed with Vision Racing to return to the IRL for the 2007 season as well as drive with the team in the 2007 24 Hours of Daytona.

On August 5, 2007, during the Firestone Indy 400, Foyt was involved in a seven-car accident in which Dario Franchitti's vehicle was sent airborne and then came down on Foyt's car. While Foyt was uninjured, Franchitti's car left visible tire marks on Foyt's helmet. Foyt's crew was able to repair the car and get him back on the track where he completed enough laps to finish eighth. The following week at the Meijer Indy 300, Foyt's crew gave him great pit stops which allowed him to take to lead with ten laps remaining. Even though Foyt was passed a few laps later by Tony Kanaan and Scott Dixon, he managed to hold on the rest of the way and drive to a career-best 3rd-place finish, the first Top-5 finish of his career. It was also the best finish in Vision Racing's team history, tying Tomas Scheckter's third-place finish at the Milwaukee Mile in 2006.

=== 2008 ===
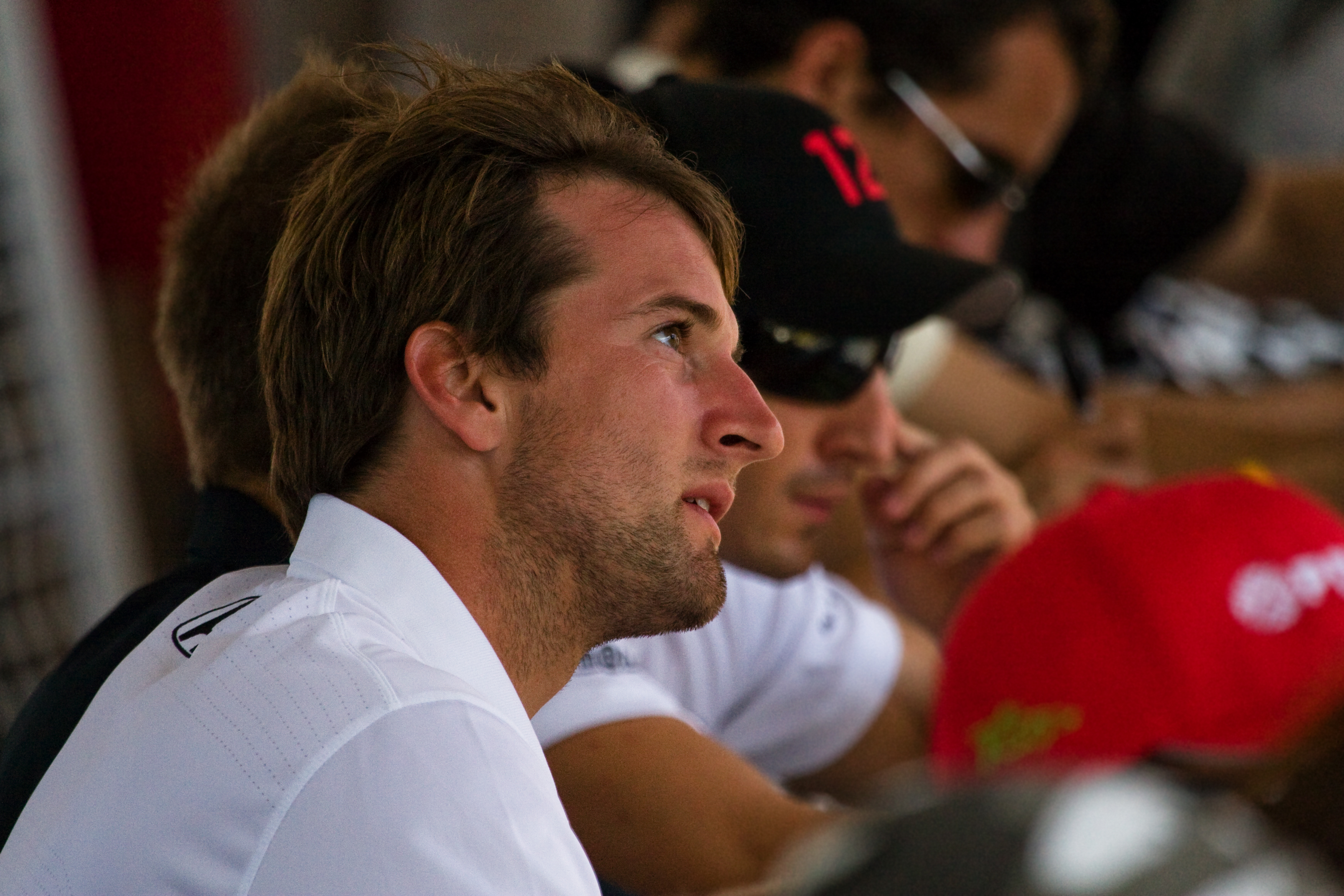
Signing autographs in 2008

Foyt returned to be one of Vision Racing's drivers in the 2008 24 Hours of Daytona. He returned to the Vision team for the 2008 IndyCar Series driving the No. 2 car that was formerly driven by Tomas Scheckter.

On March 28, Foyt seemed to have earned a career best start for an IndyCar Series race at Homestead-Miami Speedway for the 2008 GAINSCO Auto Insurance Indy 300 with the third best qualifying time. His Vision Racing teammate, Ed Carpenter also earned a career best start with the second best qualifying time. However, both cars failed technical inspection, meaning they had to start at the rear of the field. Foyt drove his No. 2 entry from the last position (25th) to a ninth-place finish in the race.

Two races later at Twin Ring Motegi in Japan, Foyt had his first top-ten start of the season for the Indy Japan 300 when qualifying was rained out. The starting grid was based on driver points standings. Of the drivers there, Foyt was eighth in the championship points standings. He was helped with some drivers ahead of him racing in the Grand Prix of Long Beach. Foyt had contact with the wall, forcing him to retire from the race early, with a 15th-place finish.

The following week at Kansas Speedway, Foyt and his teammate Ed Carpenter shared the third row, with Foyt qualifying fifth. It was his best career start and second top-10 start in a row. In the RoadRunner Turbo Indy 300, Foyt had his chances of a high finish end as his car was caught in the pits when an accident involving Buddy Rice occurred. Foyt would drive to an eighth-place finish. Foyt's best finish of the season came in the Iowa Corn Indy 250 in June at the Iowa Speedway where he finished fifth. Foyt finished the season 19th in the points standings.

=== 2009–2010 ===
Vision Racing was unable to secure sponsorship to run a second car in 2009, leaving Foyt out of a ride. He returned to the Foyt-Greer Racing team for the 2009 Indianapolis 500, driving the No. 41 vehicle. Foyt finished 16th on the lead lap as his teammate Vítor Meira was injured in a late-race crash. Paul Tracy was drafted as the substitute driver for Meira at the next race, but Foyt stepped into the car for his home race at Texas Motor Speedway. Ryan Hunter-Reay drove the car for the rest of the season and Texas would be Foyt's last race of 2009.

In 2010, Foyt was again entered in a second Foyt Enterprises car for the Indy 500. After the morning practice session on the final day of qualifying, Foyt and his grandfather got in an argument regarding the car's setup resulting in the younger A. J. quitting the team. Jaques Lazier was drafted in on short notice to qualify the car but was not fast enough to make the field.

== Post-racing career ==
Foyt has been employed by the Indianapolis Colts since 2010 as a scouting assistant, and married Casey Irsay, the daughter of late owner Jim Irsay. He also went into partnership with his cousin Larry Foyt in the wine business following the conclusion of his racing career, opening the Foyt Wine Collective in May 2015, with locations in Speedway, Indiana, Fredericksburg, Texas and Sonoma County, California with the support of A. J. Foyt.

== Motorsports career results ==
=== American Open-Wheel racing results ===
(key)

==== Indy Lights ====
Year	Team	1	2	3	4	5	6	7	Rank	Points	Ref
2002	A. J. Foyt Enterprises	**KAN**; 1	NSH; 4	MIS; 1	**KTY**; 1	STL; 9	**CHI**; 6	**TXS**; 1	**1st**	**290**	

==== IRL IndyCar Series ====
Year	Team	No.	Chassis	Engine	1	2	3	4	5	6	7	8	9	10	11	12	13	14	15	16	17	18	19	Rank	Points	Ref
2003	A. J. Foyt Enterprises	14	Dallara IR-03	Toyota Indy V8	HMS; 17	PHX; 18		INDY; 18		PPIR; 22			NSH; 17		STL; 17		NZR; 11	CHI; 17						21st	198	
2003	A. J. Foyt Enterprises	14	G-Force GF09	Toyota Indy V8			MOT; 18		TXS; 21		RIR; 21	KAN; 15		MIS; 14		KTY; 17			FON; 17	TX2; 22				21st	198	
2004	A. J. Foyt Enterprises	14	Dallara IR-04	Toyota Indy V8	TXS; 15	PHX; 14	MOT; 15	INDY; 33	TXS; 22	RIR; 11	KAN; 13	NSH; 16	MIL; 16	MIS; 15	KTY; 18	PPIR; 21	NZR; 15	CHI; 16	FON; 19	TX2; 10				18th	232	
2005	A. J. Foyt Enterprises	14	Dallara IR-05	Toyota Indy V8	HMS; 9	PHX; 14	STP; 21	MOT; 14	INDY; 28	TXS; 18	RIR; 14	KAN; 16	NSH; 12	MIL; 21	MIS; 12									20th	231	
2005	A. J. Foyt Enterprises	14	Dallara IR-05	Chevrolet Indy V8												KTY; 9	PPIR; 21	SNM	CHI; 11	WGL	FON; 21			20th	231	
2006	Andretti Green Racing	27	Dallara IR-05	Honda HI6R V8	HMS	STP	MOT	INDY	WGL	TXS	RIR	KAN	NSH	MIL	MIS	KTY	SNM	CHI; 14						26th	16	
2007	Vision Racing	22	Dallara IR-05	Honda HI7R V8	HMS; 18	STP; 13	MOT; 13	KAN; 9	INDY; 14	MIL; 13	TXS; 17	IOW; 12	RIR; 13	WGL; 15	NSH; 12	MDO; 13	MIS; 8	KTY; 3	SNM; 15	DET; 9	CHI; 10			14th	315	
2008	Vision Racing	2	Dallara IR-05	Honda HI7R V8	HMS; 9	STP; 11	MOT^{1} 15	LBH^{1} DNP	KAN; 8	INDY; 21	MIL; 17	TXS; 12	IOW; 5	RIR; 24	WGL; 19	NSH; 22	MDO; 18	EDM; 12	KTY; 20	SNM; 20	DET; 10	CHI; 13	SRF^{2} 17	19th	280	
2009	A. J. Foyt Enterprises	41	Dallara IR-05	Honda HI7R V8	STP	LBH	KAN	INDY; 16	MIL															33rd	26	
2009	A. J. Foyt Enterprises	14	Dallara IR-05	Honda HI7R V8						TXS; 20	IOW	RIR	WGL	TOR	EDM	KTY	MDO	SNM	CHI	MOT	HMS			33rd	26	
2010	A. J. Foyt Enterprises	41	Dallara IR-05	Honda HI7R V8	SAO	STP	ALA	LBH	KAN	INDY; Wth^{3}	TXS	IOW	WGL	TOR	EDM	MDO	SNM	CHI	KTY	MOT	HMS			NC	–	

^{1} Run on same day.
^{2} Non-points paying, exhibition race.
^{3} Foyt was entered, practiced, and made a qualifying attempt on Pole Day, but failed to make the top 24. On Bump Day, he quit the team and was replaced by Jaques Lazier.

Years	Teams	Races	Poles	Wins	Podiums (Non-win)	Top 10s (Non-podium)	Indianapolis 500 Wins	Championships
7	3	84	0	0	1	8	0	0

=== Indy 500 results ===
Year	Chassis	Engine	Start	Finish	Team
2003	Dallara	Toyota	23	18	Foyt
2004	Dallara	Toyota	21	33	Foyt
2005	Dallara	Toyota	28	28	Foyt
2007	Dallara	Honda	18	14	Vision
2008	Dallara	Honda	31	21	Vision
2009	Dallara	Honda	25	16	Foyt
2010	Dallara	Honda	DNQ		Foyt

=== NASCAR ===
(key) (Bold – Pole position awarded by qualifying time. Italics – Pole position earned by points standings or practice time. * – Most laps led; small number denotes finishing position.)

==== Busch Series ====
NASCAR Busch Series results
Year	Team	No.	Make	1	2	3	4	5	6	7	8	9	10	11	12	13	14	15	16	17	18	19	20	21	22	23	24	25	26	27	28	29	30	31	32	33	34	35	NBSC	Pts	Ref
2005	Akins Motorsports	38	Dodge	DAY	CAL	MXC	LVS	ATL	NSH	BRI	TEX	PHO	TAL	DAR	RCH	CLT	DOV	NSH	KEN	MLW	DAY	CHI	NHA	PPR	GTY	IRP	GLN	MCH	BRI	CAL	RCH	DOV	KAN	CLT	MEM; 32	TEX; 39	PHO; 42	HOM; 24	87th	241	
2006	Braun-Akins Racing	38	Dodge	DAY; 42	CAL; 38	MXC; 21	LVS; 37	ATL; 33	BRI; 35	TEX; 41	NSH	PHO	TAL																										74th	400	
2006	FitzBradshaw Racing	14	Dodge											RCH; DNQ	DAR	CLT	DOV	NSH	KEN	MLW	DAY	CHI	NHA	MAR	GTY	IRP	GLN	MCH	BRI	CAL	RCH	DOV	KAN	CLT	MEM	TEX	PHO	HOM	74th	400	

Sporting positions
Preceded by Townsend Bell (Indy Lights)	Infiniti Pro Series Champion; 2002	Succeeded by Mark Taylor
