= 2003 IndyCar Series =

American auto racing season

2003 IndyCar season
- IndyCar Series

Season
- Races: 16
- Start date: March 2
- End date: October 17

Awards
- Drivers' champion: (New Zealand) Scott Dixon
- Manufacturers' Cup: (Japan) Toyota
- Rookie of the Year: (United Kingdom) Dan Wheldon
- Indianapolis 500 winner: (Brazil) Gil de Ferran

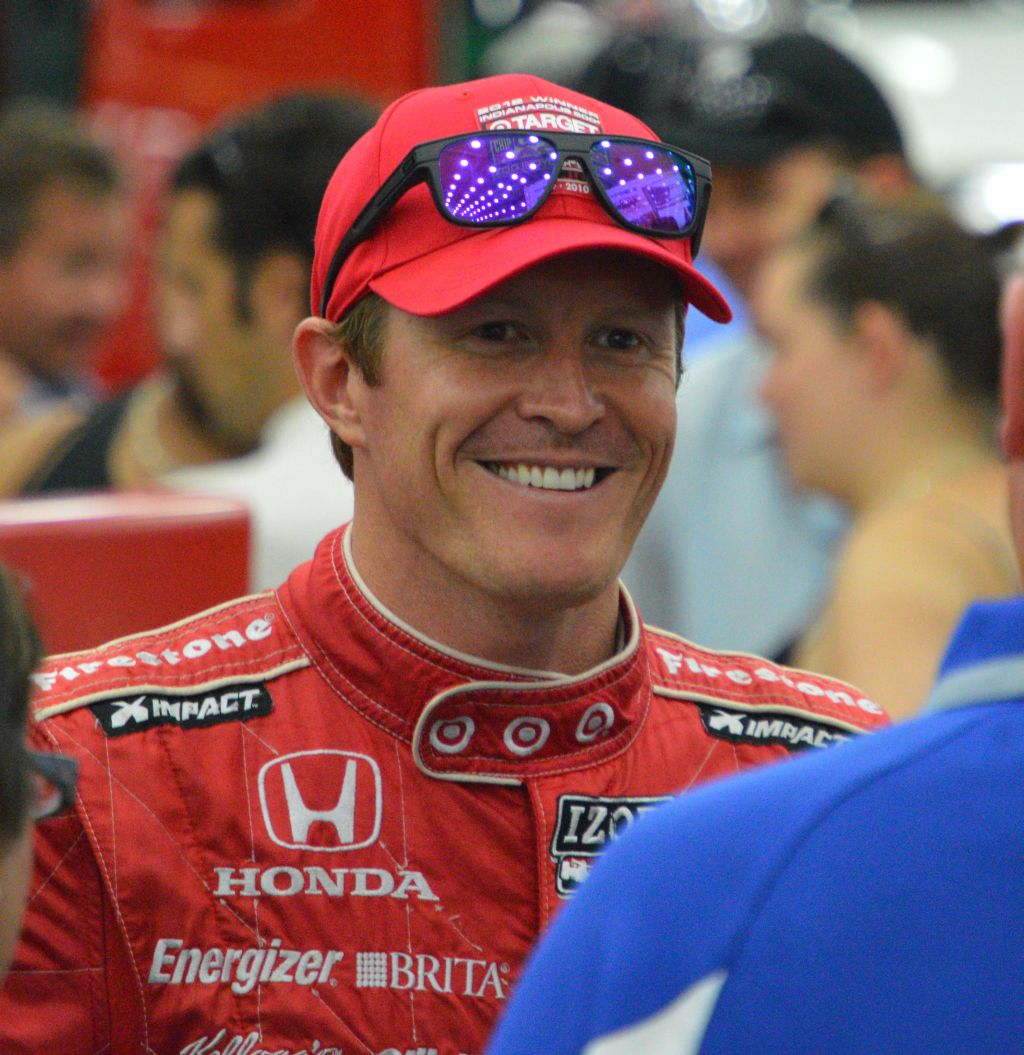
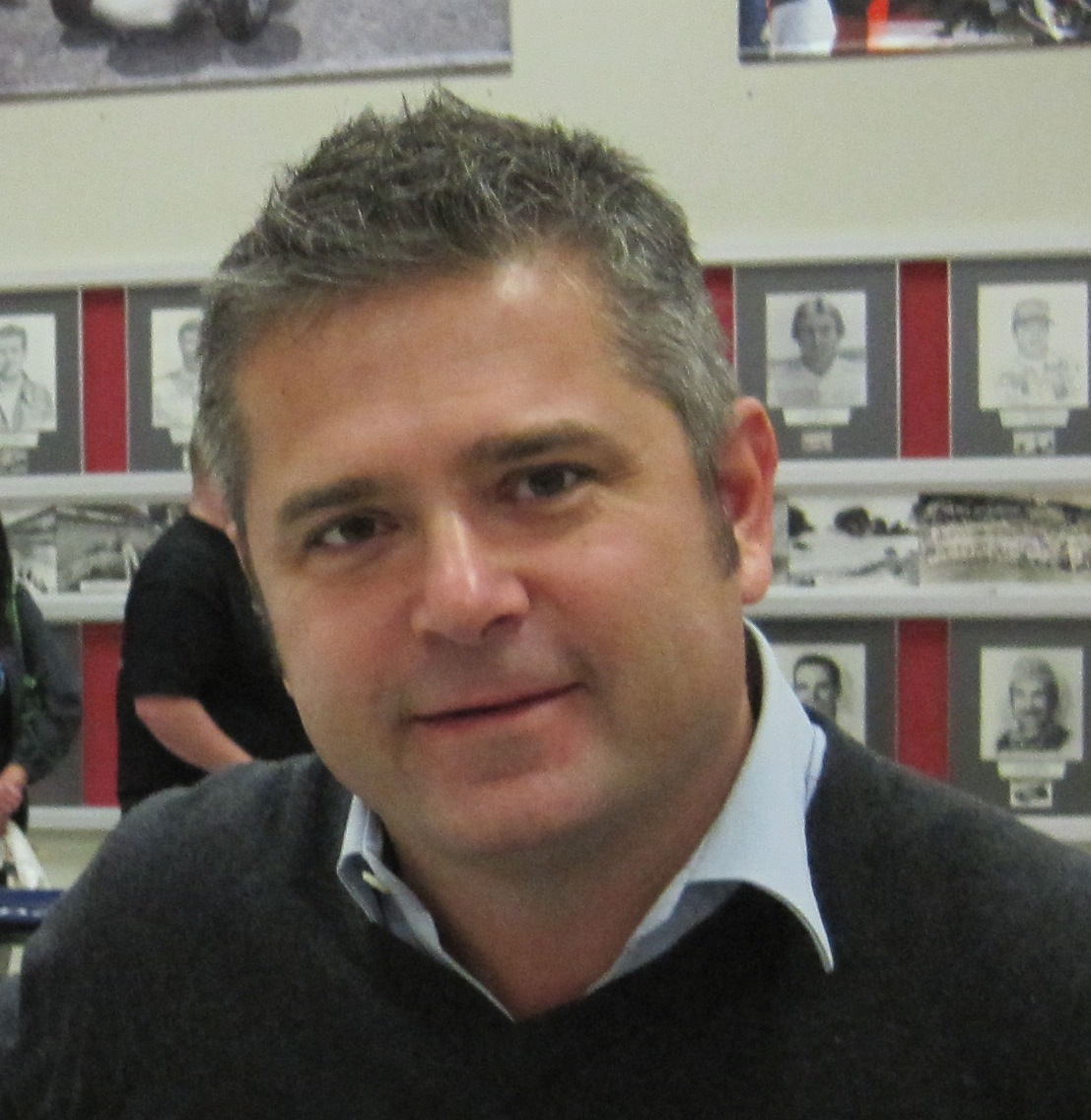
Scott Dixon (left) won his first Drivers' Championship while Gil de Ferran (right) finished second in the championship while winning the 2003 Indianapolis 500.

The 2003 IndyCar Series was the 92nd official championship season of American open-wheel racing and the 8th season under Indy Racing League sanction. Its showcase event was the 87th running of the Indianapolis 500, which was won by Team Penske driver Gil de Ferran for his first and only time. Sam Hornish Jr. entered the season as the back-to-back defending champion.

== Season summary ==
The 2003 IRL IndyCar Series brought some of the biggest changes in its history. The league adopted the name IndyCar Series, after a settlement with CART prohibiting its use had expired. Several former CART teams brought their full operations to the IRL, most notably major squads Chip Ganassi Racing and Andretti Green Racing, as well as former CART engine manufacturers Toyota and Honda, replacing Infiniti who shifted its efforts to the new feeder series Infiniti Pro Series. Many of the IRL's old guard including Robbie Buhl, Greg Ray, and Buddy Lazier had difficulty competing in this new manufacturer-driven landscape. The league also added its first international race this year, taking over the CART date at Twin Ring Motegi.

The season's most successful entrants were Ganassi and Team Penske that had made the switch already the year before. New Zealander Scott Dixon won the opening race of the season at Homestead and ran very consistently all year long to win his first title at the age of 23. Gil de Ferran won Penske's third consecutive Indianapolis 500 in May and finished second to Dixon in the title race. The finale however was marred by a severe incident that nearly killed former series' champion and Indy 500 winner Kenny Bräck. De Ferran won the race with Dixon in second being well enough to seal the title. Bräck would eventually recover; however, Tony Renna, a Ganassi development driver, lost his life in a test crash at Indianapolis after the season had officially ended.

2003 was also the first and only engine title for Toyota and also the first Asian and Japanese car manufacturer to win an IndyCar Series IRL-era engine manufacturer's title and thus ending a seven-year American engine manufacturer's supremacy. As of 2024, 2003 was also the last chassis manufacturer title victory for G-Force Technologies to date.

== Confirmed entries ==
Team	Chassis	Engine	No	Drivers	Rounds
A. J. Foyt Enterprises	Dallara; G-Force (Note: Used by Daré, by Hattori at Homestead and Motegi, and by Foyt IV in seven rounds: Motegi, Texas 1 and 2, Kansas, Michigan, Kentucky and Fontana.)	Toyota	5	(Japan) Shigeaki Hattori	1–4
A. J. Foyt Enterprises	Dallara; G-Force	Toyota	5	(Brazil) Airton Daré (Note: Injured during a practice crash at Texas.)	5
A. J. Foyt Enterprises	Dallara; G-Force	Toyota	5	(United States) Jaques Lazier	5–8
A. J. Foyt Enterprises	Dallara; G-Force	Toyota	14	(United States) A. J. Foyt IV	All
A. J. Foyt Enterprises	Dallara; G-Force	Toyota	41	(Brazil) Airton Daré	4
Access Motorsports	G-Force	Honda	13	(United States) Greg Ray	3–16
Andretti Green Racing	Dallara	Honda	7	(United States) Michael Andretti	1–4
Andretti Green Racing	Dallara	Honda	7	(United Kingdom) Dan Wheldon	16
Andretti Green Racing	Dallara	Honda	11	(Brazil) Tony Kanaan	All
Andretti Green Racing	Dallara	Honda	26	(United Kingdom) Dan Wheldon	4–15
Andretti Green Racing	Dallara	Honda	27	(United Kingdom) Dan Wheldon	3
Andretti Green Racing	Dallara	Honda	27	(United Kingdom) Dario Franchitti	1–2, 6
Andretti Green Racing	Dallara	Honda	27	(United States) Robby Gordon	4
Andretti Green Racing	Dallara	Honda	27	(United States) Bryan Herta	5, 7–16
Beck Motorsports	Dallara	Honda	54	(Japan) Shinji Nakano	3–4
Dreyer & Reinbold Racing	Dallara	Chevrolet	23	(United States) Sarah Fisher	All
Dreyer & Reinbold Racing	Dallara	Chevrolet	24	(United States) Robbie Buhl	All
Fernández Racing	Dallara	Honda	55	(United States) Roger Yasukawa	All
Hemelgarn Racing	Dallara	Chevrolet	91	(United States) Buddy Lazier	2–14
Hemelgarn Racing	Dallara	Chevrolet	91	(United States) Richie Hearn	15–16
Kelley Racing	Dallara	Toyota	8	(United States) Scott Sharp	All
Kelley Racing	Dallara	Toyota	31	(United States) Al Unser Jr.	All
Kelley Racing	Dallara	Toyota	32	(United States) Tony Renna	4
Marlboro Team Penske	Dallara	Toyota	3	(Brazil) Hélio Castroneves	All
Marlboro Team Penske	Dallara	Toyota	6	(Brazil) Gil de Ferran	1–2, 6–14, 16
Marlboro Team Penske	G-Force	Toyota	6	(Brazil) Gil de Ferran	4–5, 15
Marlboro Team Penske	G-Force	Toyota	6	(United States) Alex Barron	3
Mo Nunn Racing	Dallara	Toyota	12	(Japan) Tora Takagi	11–12
Mo Nunn Racing	G-Force	Toyota	12	(Japan) Tora Takagi	1–10, 13–16
Mo Nunn Racing	G-Force	Toyota	20	(Netherlands) Arie Luyendyk (Note: Injured during a practice crash at Indianapolis.)	4
Mo Nunn Racing	G-Force	Toyota	20	(United States) Alex Barron	4
Mo Nunn Racing	G-Force	Toyota	21	(Brazil) Felipe Giaffone	1–8, 14–16
Mo Nunn Racing	G-Force	Toyota	21	(United States) Alex Barron	9–13
Panther Racing	Dallara	Chevrolet	4	(United States) Sam Hornish Jr.	All
Panther Racing	Dallara	Chevrolet	44	(United States) Robby McGehee	4
Panther Racing	Dallara	Chevrolet	98	(United States) Billy Boat	4
PDM Racing	Dallara	Chevrolet	18	(United States) Scott Mayer	1–3
PDM Racing	Dallara	Chevrolet	18	(United States) Jimmy Kite	4
PDM Racing	Dallara	Chevrolet	18	(United States) Ed Carpenter	14–16
Red Bull Cheever Racing	Dallara	Chevrolet	52	(United States) Buddy Rice	1–13
Red Bull Cheever Racing	Dallara	Chevrolet	52	(United States) Alex Barron	14–16
Sam Schmidt Motorsports	G-Force	Toyota	99	(United States) Richie Hearn	4
Target Chip Ganassi Racing	G-Force	Toyota	9	(New Zealand) Scott Dixon	All
Target Chip Ganassi Racing	G-Force	Toyota	10	(South Africa) Tomas Scheckter	All
Team Menard	Dallara	Chevrolet	2	(United States) Jaques Lazier	1–4, 13
Team Menard	Dallara	Chevrolet	2	(Brazil) Vítor Meira	5–12, 15–16
Team Menard	Dallara	Chevrolet	2	(United States) Richie Hearn	14
Team Menard	Dallara	Chevrolet	22	(Brazil) Vítor Meira	4
Team Rahal	Dallara	Honda	15	(Sweden) Kenny Bräck	All
Team Rahal	Dallara	Honda	19	(United States) Jimmy Vasser	4

== Schedule ==
Rnd	Date	Race Name	Track	Location
1	March 2	Toyota Indy 300	Homestead-Miami Speedway	Homestead, Florida
2	March 23	Purex Dial Indy 200	Phoenix International Raceway	Phoenix, Arizona
3	April 13	Indy Japan 300	Twin Ring Motegi	Motegi, Japan
4	May 25	87th Indianapolis 500	Indianapolis Motor Speedway	Speedway, Indiana
5	June 7	Bombardier 500	Texas Motor Speedway	Fort Worth, Texas
6	June 15	Honda Indy 225	Pikes Peak International Raceway	Fountain, Colorado
7	June 28	SunTrust Indy Challenge	Richmond International Raceway	Richmond, Virginia
8	July 6	Kansas Indy 300	Kansas Speedway	Kansas City, Kansas
9	July 19	Firestone Indy 200	Nashville Superspeedway	Lebanon, Tennessee
10	July 27	Firestone Indy 400	Michigan International Speedway	Brooklyn, Michigan
11	August 10	Emerson Indy 250	Gateway International Raceway	Madison, Illinois
12	August 17	Belterra Casino Indy 300	Kentucky Speedway	Sparta, Kentucky
13	August 24	Firestone Indy 225	Nazareth Speedway	Nazareth, Pennsylvania
14	September 7	Delphi Indy 300	Chicagoland Speedway	Joliet, Illinois
15	September 21	Toyota Indy 400	California Speedway	Fontana, California
16	October 12	Chevy 500	Texas Motor Speedway	Fort Worth, Texas

== Results ==
Rd.	Race	Pole position	Fastest lap	Most laps led	Race winner			
Rd.	Race	Pole position	Fastest lap	Most laps led	Driver	Team	Chassis	Engine
1	Homestead	(Brazil) Tony Kanaan	(Brazil) Tony Kanaan	(Brazil) Gil de Ferran	(New Zealand) Scott Dixon	Chip Ganassi Racing	G-Force	Toyota
2	Phoenix	(Brazil) Tony Kanaan	(New Zealand) Scott Dixon	(Brazil) Tony Kanaan	(Brazil) Tony Kanaan	Andretti Green Racing	Dallara	Honda
3	Motegi	(New Zealand) Scott Dixon	(South Africa) Tomas Scheckter	(Brazil) Tony Kanaan	(United States) Scott Sharp	Kelley Racing	Dallara	Toyota
4	Indianapolis	(Brazil) Hélio Castroneves	(Brazil) Tony Kanaan	(South Africa) Tomas Scheckter	(Brazil) Gil de Ferran	Team Penske	G-Force	Toyota
5	Texas 1	(South Africa) Tomas Scheckter	(Brazil) Felipe Giaffone	(South Africa) Tomas Scheckter	(United States) Al Unser Jr.	Kelley Racing	Dallara	Toyota
6	Pikes Peak	(Brazil) Tony Kanaan	(Brazil) Tony Kanaan	(New Zealand) Scott Dixon	(New Zealand) Scott Dixon	Chip Ganassi Racing	G-Force	Toyota
7	Richmond	(New Zealand) Scott Dixon	(South Africa) Tomas Scheckter	(New Zealand) Scott Dixon	(New Zealand) Scott Dixon	Chip Ganassi Racing	G-Force	Toyota
8	Kansas	(New Zealand) Scott Dixon	(Brazil) Tony Kanaan	(Brazil) Gil de Ferran	(United States) Bryan Herta	Andretti Green Racing	Dallara	Honda
9	Nashville	(New Zealand) Scott Dixon	(United States) Sam Hornish Jr.	(Brazil) Tony Kanaan	(Brazil) Gil de Ferran	Team Penske	Dallara	Toyota
10	Michigan	(South Africa) Tomas Scheckter	(United States) Bryan Herta	(United States) Sam Hornish Jr.	(United States) Alex Barron	Mo Nunn Racing	G-Force	Toyota
11	Gateway	(Brazil) Hélio Castroneves	(New Zealand) Scott Dixon	(Brazil) Hélio Castroneves	(Brazil) Hélio Castroneves	Team Penske	Dallara	Toyota
12	Kentucky	(United States) Sam Hornish Jr.	(United States) Sarah Fisher	(United States) Sam Hornish Jr.	(United States) Sam Hornish Jr.	Panther Racing	Dallara	Chevrolet
13	Nazareth	(New Zealand) Scott Dixon	(United States) Sam Hornish Jr.	(Brazil) Hélio Castroneves	(Brazil) Hélio Castroneves	Team Penske	Dallara	Toyota
14	Chicagoland	(United States) Richie Hearn	(United States) Bryan Herta	(South Africa) Tomas Scheckter	(United States) Sam Hornish Jr.	Panther Racing	Dallara	Chevrolet
15	Fontana	(Brazil) Hélio Castroneves	(New Zealand) Scott Dixon	(South Africa) Tomas Scheckter	(United States) Sam Hornish Jr.	Panther Racing	Dallara	Chevrolet
16	Texas 2	(Brazil) Gil de Ferran	(Brazil) Tony Kanaan	(Brazil) Gil de Ferran	(Brazil) Gil de Ferran	Team Penske	Dallara	Toyota

== Race summaries ==
=== Toyota Indy 300 ===
This race was held March 2 at Homestead-Miami Speedway. Tony Kanaan won the pole.

Top ten results

1. 9- Scott Dixon
2. 6- Gil de Ferran
3. 3- Hélio Castroneves
4. 11- Tony Kanaan
5. 8- Scott Sharp
6. 7- Michael Andretti
7. 27- Dario Franchitti
8. 10- Tomas Scheckter
9. 21- Felipe Giaffone
10. 4- Sam Hornish Jr.

=== Purex Dial Indy 200 ===
This race was held March 23 at Phoenix International Raceway. Tony Kanaan won the pole.

Top ten results

1. 11- Tony Kanaan
2. 3- Hélio Castroneves
3. 21- Felipe Giaffone
4. 31- Al Unser Jr.
5. 15- Kenny Bräck
6. 2- Jaques Lazier
7. 8- Scott Sharp
8. 23- Sarah Fisher
9. 52- Buddy Rice
10. 5- Shigeaki Hattori

=== Inaugural Indy Japan 300 ===
This race was held April 13 at Twin Ring Motegi. Scott Dixon won the pole.

Top ten results

1. 8- Scott Sharp
2. 15- Kenny Bräck
3. 21- Felipe Giaffone
4. 7- Michael Andretti
5. 31- Al Unser Jr.
6. 4- Sam Hornish Jr.
7. 27- Dan Wheldon
8. 12- Tora Takagi
9. 13- Greg Ray
10. 24- Robbie Buhl

=== 87th Indianapolis 500 ===
The 87th Indy 500 was held May 25 at the Indianapolis Motor Speedway. Hélio Castroneves sat on pole.

Top ten results

1. 6- Gil de Ferran
2. 3- Hélio Castroneves
3. 11- Tony Kanaan
4. 10- Tomas Scheckter
5. 12- Tora Takagi
6. 20- Alex Barron
7. 32- Tony Renna
8. 13- Greg Ray
9. 31- Al Unser Jr.
10. 55- Roger Yasukawa
- Hélio Castroneves came up just short of the three-peat in the 500. He got hung up in lap traffic which enabled Gil de Ferran to get by and lead the final 30 laps for his only 500 triumph.

=== Bombardier 500 ===
This race was held June 7 at Texas Motor Speedway. Tomas Scheckter won the pole.

Top ten results

1. 31- Al Unser Jr.
2. 11- Tony Kanaan
3. 12- Tora Takagi
4. 15- Kenny Bräck
5. 27- Bryan Herta
6. 9- Scott Dixon
7. 3- Hélio Castroneves
8. 6- Gil de Ferran
9. 12- Roger Yasukawa
10. 4- Sam Hornish Jr.

=== Honda Indy 225 ===
This race was held June 15 at Pikes Peak International Raceway. Tony Kanaan won the pole.

Top ten results

1. 9- Scott Dixon
2. 11- Tony Kanaan
3. 6- Gil de Ferran
4. 27- Dario Franchitti
5. 4- Sam Hornish Jr.
6. 12- Tora Takagi
7. 15- Kenny Bräck
8. 10- Tomas Scheckter
9. 52- Buddy Rice
10. 91- Buddy Lazier

=== SunTrust Indy Challenge ===
This race was held June 28 at Richmond International Raceway. Scott Dixon won the pole.

Top ten results

1. 9- Scott Dixon
2. 3- Hélio Castroneves
3. 6- Gil de Ferran
4. 4- Sam Hornish Jr.
5. 11- Tony Kanaan
6. 21- Felipe Giaffone
7. 15- Kenny Bräck
8. 26- Dan Wheldon
9. 52- Buddy Rice
10. 31- Al Unser Jr.
- The race was originally scheduled for 250 laps, but shortened to 206 laps due to rain.

=== Kansas Indy 300 ===
This race was held July 6 at Kansas Speedway. Scott Dixon won the pole.

Top ten results

1. 27- Bryan Herta
2. 3- Hélio Castroneves
3. 6- Gil de Ferran
4. 11- Tony Kanaan
5. 15- Kenny Bräck
6. 9- Scott Dixon
7. 55- Roger Yasukawa
8. 13- Greg Ray
9. 10- Tomas Scheckter
10. 5- Jaques Lazier

=== Firestone Indy 200 ===
This race was held July 19 at Nashville Superspeedway. Scott Dixon won the pole.

Top ten results

1. 6- Gil de Ferran
2. 9- Scott Dixon
3. 3- Hélio Castroneves
4. 26- Dan Wheldon
5. 21- Alex Barron
6. 15- Kenny Bräck
7. 12- Tora Takagi
8. 31- Al Unser Jr.
9. 11- Tony Kanaan
10. 10- Tomas Scheckter

=== Firestone Indy 400 ===
This race was held July 27 at Michigan International Speedway. Tomas Scheckter won the pole.

Top ten results

1. 21- Alex Barron
2. 4- Sam Hornish Jr.
3. 10- Tomas Scheckter
4. 8- Scott Sharp
5. 9- Scott Dixon
6. 12- Tora Takagi
7. 6- Gil de Ferran
8. 55- Roger Yasukawa
9. 31- Al Unser Jr.
10. 13- Greg Ray

=== Emerson Indy 250 ===
This race was held August 10 at Gateway International Raceway. Hélio Castroneves won the pole.

Top ten results

1. 3- Hélio Castroneves
2. 11- Tony Kanaan
3. 6- Gil de Ferran
4. 10- Tomas Scheckter
5. 26- Dan Wheldon
6. 4- Sam Hornish Jr.
7. 12- Tora Takagi
8. 13- Greg Ray
9. 2- Vítor Meira
10. 8- Scott Sharp

=== Belterra Casino Indy 300 ===
This race was held August 17 at Kentucky Speedway. Sam Hornish Jr. won the pole.

Top ten results

1. 4- Sam Hornish Jr.
2. 9- Scott Dixon
3. 27- Bryan Herta
4. 31- Al Unser Jr.
5. 3- Hélio Castroneves
6. 11- Tony Kanaan
7. 24- Robbie Buhl
8. 26- Dan Wheldon
9. 6- Gil de Ferran
10. 10- Tomas Scheckter

=== Firestone Indy 225 ===
This race was held August 24 at Nazareth Speedway. Scott Dixon won the pole.

Top ten results

1. 3- Hélio Castroneves
2. 4- Sam Hornish Jr.
3. 27- Bryan Herta
4. 6- Gil de Ferran
5. 15- Kenny Bräck
6. 31- Al Unser Jr.
7. 26- Dan Wheldon
8. 55- Roger Yasukawa
9. 24- Robbie Buhl
10. 91- Buddy Rice

=== Delphi Indy 300 ===
This race was held September 7 at Chicagoland Speedway. Richie Hearn won the pole.

Top ten results

1. 4- Sam Hornish Jr.
2. 9- Scott Dixon
3. 27- Bryan Herta
4. 26- Dan Wheldon
5. 10- Tomas Scheckter
6. 11- Tony Kanaan
7. 52- Alex Barron
8. 55- Roger Yasukawa
9. 12- Tora Takagi
10. 24- Robbie Buhl

=== Toyota Indy 400 ===
This race was held September 21 at California Speedway. Hélio Castroneves won the pole.

Top ten results

1. 4- Sam Hornish Jr.
2. 9- Scott Dixon
3. 11- Tony Kanaan
4. 26- Dan Wheldon
5. 10- Tomas Scheckter
6. 3- Hélio Castroneves
7. 55- Roger Yasukawa
8. 8- Scott Sharp
9. 31- Al Unser Jr.
10. 52- Alex Barron
- This race was the fastest circuit race ever in motorsport history, with an average speed of 207.151 mph (333.306 km/h) over 400 miles (643.6 km). This also makes it the de facto fastest ever 400 mile motor race beating the NASCAR record set during the 1999 Kmart 400.

=== Chevy 500 ===
This race was held October 12 at Texas Motor Speedway. Gil de Ferran won the pole.

Top ten results

1. 6- Gil de Ferran
2. 9- Scott Dixon
3. 7- Dan Wheldon
4. 2- Vítor Meira
5. 27- Bryan Herta
6. 8- Scott Sharp
7. 12- Tora Takagi
8. 13- Greg Ray
9. 31- Al Unser Jr.
10. 55- Roger Yasukawa
- The race was memorable for a five-way championship duel involving de Ferran, Scott Dixon, Hélio Castroneves, Tony Kanaan, and two-time titlist Sam Hornish Jr.
- The race was also notable for a frightening, but non-fatal, accident involving Tomas Scheckter and 1999 Indianapolis 500 champion Kenny Bräck. Scheckter was uninjured, but the Swede was launched into the air after wheel-to-wheel contact on the backstretch and violently clobbered the catch fencing. Debris was scattered across the track, and the already long period of yellow flag laps prompted IRL race control to end the race at lap 195 of 200. Because the race reached 1 lap past the halfway point the race was considered official. Gil de Ferran, Bräck's former title rival in CART, won in his final IndyCar race, joining Ray Harroun and Sam Hanks (both of whom retired immediately after winning an Indianapolis 500) as drivers who retired from U.S. open wheel competition in the winner's circle.
- Scott Dixon won the IRL title in his first season in the IndyCar Series (having spent two seasons in CART) and Englishman Dan Wheldon beat Roger Yasukawa for Bombardier Rookie of the Year honors.

== Points standings ==
Pos	Driver	HOM	PHX	MOT	INDY	TMS1	PPR	RIC	KAN	NSS	MIS	GTW	KEN	NAZ	CHI	CAL	TMS2	Pts
1	(New Zealand) Scott Dixon	1	20	**15**	17	6	1*	**1***	**6**	**2**	5	15	2	**16**	2	2	2	507
2	(Brazil) Gil de Ferran	2*	14		1	8	3	3	3*	1	7	3	9	4	12	15	**1***	489
3	(Brazil) Hélio Castroneves	3	2	22	**2**	7	12	2	2	3	17	**1***	5	1*	20	**6**	13	484
4	(Brazil) Tony Kanaan	**4**	**1***	14*	3	2	**2**	5	4	9*	16	2	6	18	6	3	14	476
5	(United States) Sam Hornish Jr.	10	21	6	15	10	5	4	17	11	2*	6	**1***	2	1	1	17	461
6	(United States) Al Unser Jr.	13	4	5	9	1	14	10	14	8	9	20	4	6	19	9	9	374
7	(South Africa) Tomas Scheckter	8	15	16	4*	**18***	8	18	9	10	**3**	4	10	19	5*	5*	15	356
8	(United States) Scott Sharp	5	7	1	20	16	11	17	16	13	4	10	13	12	11	8	6	351
9	(Sweden) Kenny Bräck	11	5	2	16	4	7	7	5	6	18	19	19	5	21	20	16	342
10	(Japan) Tora Takagi	12	22	8	5	3	6	13	18	7	6	7	18	14	9	18	7	317
11	(United Kingdom) Dan Wheldon RY			7	19	20	19	8	21	4	20	5	8	7	4	4	3	312
12	(United States) Roger Yasukawa R	14	17	21	10	9	17	11	7	15	8	18	12	8	8	7	10	301
13	(United States) Bryan Herta					5		14	1	12	19	21	3	3	3	22	5	277
14	(United States) Robbie Buhl	19	12	10	23	22	15	15	12	21	13	12	7	9	10	12	11	261
15	(United States) Greg Ray			9	8	11	18	12	8	16	10	8	15	17	Wth	14	8	253
16	(United States) Buddy Rice	16	9	13	11	14	9	9	19	18	11	14	11	10				229
17	(United States) Alex Barron			17	6					5	1	16	20	15	7	10	20	216
18	(United States) Sarah Fisher	15	8	23	31	15	20	19	11	20	15	13	14	DNS	18	19	12	211
19	(United States) Buddy Lazier		11	19	21	13	10	20	13	14	12	11	16	13	16			201
20	(Brazil) Felipe Giaffone	9	3	3	33	17	13	6	22						15	16	19	199
21	(United States) A. J. Foyt IV R	17	18	18	18	21	22	21	15	17	14	17	17	11	17	17	22	198
22	(Brazil) Vítor Meira				12	12	16	22	20	19	21	9	Wth			11	4	170
23	(United States) Jaques Lazier	20	6	12	29	19	21	16	10					Wth				120
24	(United States) Michael Andretti	6	13	4	27													80
25	(United Kingdom) Dario Franchitti	7	16				4											72
26	(Japan) Shigeaki Hattori	18	10	20	30													43
27	(United States) Ed Carpenter R														13	13	21	43
28	(United States) Richie Hearn				28										**14**	21	18	39
29	(Japan) Shinji Nakano			11	14													35
30	(United States) Tony Renna				7													26
31	(United States) Scott Mayer R	21	19	24														26
32	(United States) Jimmy Kite				13													17
33	(United States) Robby Gordon				22													8
34	(Brazil) Airton Daré				24	Wth												6
35	(United States) Robby McGehee				25													5
36	(United States) Jimmy Vasser				26													4
37	(United States) Billy Boat				32													1
-	(Netherlands) Arie Luyendyk				Wth													0
Pos	Driver	HOM	PHX	MOT	INDY	TMS1	PPR	RIC	KAN	NSS	MIS	GTW	KEN	NAZ	CHI	CAL	TMS2	Pts

Color	Result
Gold	Winner
Silver	2nd place
Bronze	3rd place
Green	4th & 5th place
Light Blue	6th–10th place
Dark Blue	Finished (Outside Top 10)
Purple	Did not finish (Ret)
Red	Did not qualify (DNQ)
Brown	Withdrawn (Wth)
Black	Disqualified (DSQ)
White	Did not start (DNS)
Blank	Did not participate (DNP)
Blank	Not competing

**In-line notation**
**Bold**	Pole position
Italics	Ran fastest race lap
*	Led most race laps (2 points)
DNS	Any driver who qualifies but does not start (DNS), earns all the points had they taken part.
RY	Rookie of the Year
R	Rookie

- Ties in points broken by number of wins, followed by number of 2nds, 3rds, etc., and then by number of pole positions, followed by number of times qualified 2nd, etc.

Note: ^{1} Tora Takagi had 23 points deducted at Texas Motor Speedway due to unacceptable driving.

== See also ==
- 2003 Indianapolis 500
- 2003 Infiniti Pro Series season
- 2003 CART season
- 2003 Toyota Atlantic Championship season

== Bibliography ==
- Small, Steve, ed. (2004). Autocourse Indianapolis 500 & Indy Racing League Indycar Series Official Yearbook 2003. Richmond, UK: Hazleton Publishing. ISBN 978-1-903135-34-1.
