= Indy Richmond 300 =

IndyCar race

IndyCar Series
- Venue: Richmond International Raceway
- Corporate sponsor: SunTrust Banks (2001–2009)
- First race: 2001
- Last race: 2009
- Distance: 225 miles (362 km)
- Laps: 300
- Previous names: SunTrust Indy Challenge Presented by XM Satellite Radio (2006–2007); SunTrust Indy Challenge (2001–2005, 2008–2009)
- Most wins (driver): Sam Hornish Jr. (2); Scott Dixon (2)
- Most wins (team): Andretti Green Racing (3)
- Most wins (manufacturer): Chassis: Dallara (8); Engine: Honda (5)

The Indy Richmond 300 (formally known as the SunTrust Indy Challenge) was an IndyCar Series race held at Richmond Raceway near Richmond, Virginia from 2001 to 2009. From 2001 to 2007, the race was scheduled for 250 laps (187.5 miles); from 2008 to 2009, the race distance was extended to 300 laps (225 miles).

The event debuted as a Saturday night race in 2001. The event became one of the more popular races on the schedule, and was arguably the most successful IndyCar race held in traditional "NASCAR Country". The race hearkened back to the classic short track "bull ring" style of racing known for during the AAA and USAC eras of Indy car racing.

ISC traditionally paired the race with other open-wheeled racing. The NASCAR Whelen Modified Tour once accompanied the race, but in later years USAC open-wheel short track racing had been on the undercard.

AAA held two National Championship sprint car races at the track when it was still a half-mile dirt track under the name Strawberry Hill Speedway. Later, NASCAR sanctioned two Championship Car events at nearby Martinsville Speedway in 1952 and 1953.

On July 30, 2009, RIR track President Doug Fritz announced that the SunTrust Indy Challenge would not be on the 2010 IndyCar Series schedule. The cost to put on the event and possible loss of sponsorship was cited as the reason for the Indy Racing League (IRL) and the Raceway to not be able to come to an agreement on the event.

On August 28, 2019, it was announced that the IndyCar Series would be returning to Richmond in 2020, replacing the ABC Supply 500 at Pocono Raceway. However, due to schedule changes brought on by the COVID-19 pandemic and "local restrictions", IndyCar announced on May 21 that the race had been canceled.

== Past winners ==
Season	Date	Driver	Team	Chassis	Engine	Race Distance		Race Time	Average Speed (mph)	Report
Season	Date	Driver	Team	Chassis	Engine	Laps	Miles (km)	Race Time	Average Speed (mph)	Report
AAA Championship Car history
1946	October 12	(United States) Ted Horn	Ted Horn Engineering		Offy	20	10 (16.093)	0:07:27	80.537	
1946	November 10	(United States) Tommy Hinnershitz	Ted Horn Engineering			25	12.5 (20.116)			
1947 – 2000	Not held									
IndyCar Series history
2001	June 30	(United States) Buddy Lazier	Hemelgarn Racing	Dallara	Oldsmobile	250	187.5 (301.752)	1:55:27	97.435	Report
2002	June 29	(United States) Sam Hornish Jr.	Panther Racing	Dallara	Chevrolet	250	187.5 (301.752)	1:53:30	99.124	Report
2003	June 28	(New Zealand) Scott Dixon	Chip Ganassi Racing	G-Force	Toyota	206*	154.5 (248.643)	1:26:48	106.798	Report
2004	June 26	(United Kingdom) Dan Wheldon	Andretti Green Racing	Dallara	Honda	250	187.5 (301.752)	1:38:11	114.589	Report
2005	June 25	(Brazil) Hélio Castroneves	Team Penske	Dallara	Toyota	250	187.5 (301.752)	1:38:33	114.153	Report
2006	June 24	(United States) Sam Hornish Jr.	Team Penske	Dallara	Honda	250	187.5 (301.752)	1:26:49	129.572	Report
2007	June 30	(United Kingdom) Dario Franchitti	Andretti Green Racing	Dallara	Honda	250	187.5 (301.752)	1:24:20	133.408	Report
2008	June 28	(Brazil) Tony Kanaan	Andretti Green Racing	Dallara	Honda	300	225 (362.102)	2:04:06	108.79	Report
2009	June 27	(New Zealand) Scott Dixon	Chip Ganassi Racing	Dallara	Honda	300	225 (362.102)	1:48:02	124.952	Report
2010 – 2019	Not held									
2020	Canceled due to the COVID-19 pandemic.									

- 2003: Race shortened due to rain.

== Support race winners ==
NASCAR Whelen Modified Tour
Season	Date	Driver	Race Distance	
Season	Date	Driver	Laps	Miles (km)
2001	June 29	Tony Hirschman	156	117 mi (188 km)
2002	June 28	Todd Szegedy	150	112.50 mi (181.05 km)

USAC Silver Crown Series
Season	Date	Driver	Race Distance	
Season	Date	Driver	Laps	Miles (km)
2001	June 30	Aaron Fike	100	75 mi (121 km)
2002	June 29	Dave Steele	100	75 mi (121 km)
2003	June 28	Dave Steele	100	75 mi (121 km)
2004	June 26	Bobby East	100	75 mi (121 km)
2005	June 25	Dave Steele	100	75 mi (121 km)
2006	June 24	Bud Kaeding	100	75 mi (121 km)
2007	June 30	Brian Tyler	100	75 mi (121 km)
2008	June 28	Chet Fillip	100	75 mi (121 km)
2009	June 27	Brian Tyler	100	75 mi (121 km)

USAC National Sprint Car Series
Season	Date	Driver	Race Distance	
Season	Date	Driver	Laps	Miles (km)
2004	June 25	Jason McCord	60	45 mi (72 km)
2005	June 24	Ron Gregory	60	45 mi (72 km)
2006	June 23	Brian Tyler	60	45 mi (72 km)
2007	June 30	Bobby East	30	22.50 mi (36.21 km)
2008	June 27	Jerry Coons Jr	60	45 mi (72 km)
2009	June 25	Bobby Santos III	60	45 mi (72 km)
