= Toyota Indy V8 =

Overview
- Manufacturer: (United States) / (Japan) TRD
- Production: 2003–2005

Layout
- Configuration: 90° V8
- Displacement: 3.5 L (214 cu in) (2003); 3.0 L (183 cu in) (2004–2005)
- Cylinder bore: 93 mm (3.66 in)
- Piston stroke: 55.1 mm (2.17 in)
- Cylinder block material: Aluminum alloy
- Cylinder head material: Aluminum alloy
- Valvetrain: 32-valve (four-valves per cylinder), DOHC

Combustion
- Fuel system: Electronic indirect multi-point port fuel injection
- Management: Denso (2003–2005)
- Fuel type: 100% fuel grade Ethanol provided by Sunoco
- Oil system: Dry sump
- Cooling system: Single water pump

Output
- Power output: 670–690 hp (500–515 kW) (2003); 650 hp (485 kW) (2004-2005)
- Torque output: Approx. 434–488 N⋅m (320–360 ft⋅lbf) @ 10,300 rpm

Dimensions
- Dry weight: 280 lb (127 kg) excluding headers, clutch, ECU, spark box or filters

Chronology
- Predecessor: Toyota RV8F turbo (2002)

The Toyota Indy V8 is a 3-litre and 3.5-litre, naturally-aspirated racing engine, designed, developed and produced by Toyota Racing Development, for use in the IRL IndyCar Series, from 2003 to 2005.

== Background ==
The Toyota Indy V8 is an all-new engine designed from a "clean sheet of paper" for competition in the Indy Racing League (IRL) IndyCar Series beginning in 2003 although not closely resembled to Toyota RV8 series engines. The 3.5-liter, naturally aspirated power plant would make its racing debut in the 2003 season-opening Toyota Indy 300 at Homestead-Miami Speedway in March. The Toyota Indy V8 was designed, built and developed by Toyota Racing Development (TRD), U.S.A. in its 47,000 square-foot Costa Mesa, Calif., facility. Dynamometer testing began in February 2002, and the engine was tested in a race car for the first time in July 2002.

Design of the Toyota Indy V8 draws heavily on experience gained with Toyota's successful CART racing engines. The high-rpm, turbocharged engines earned 21 victories and 23 pole positions from 1999 to 2002, including the CART FedEx Championship Series Driver's (Cristiano da Matta) and Manufacturer's Championships in 2002. The Toyota RV8F and its predecessor, the Toyota RV8E (used in competition in 2000) are the only American-designed and built engines to win in CART competition during the past 22 years.

Following the 2005 IndyCar Series, Team Penske and Target Chip Ganassi Racing announced they would switch to Honda engines, leaving Toyota with no championship contenders. As a result of this and their intent to re-allocate resources for NASCAR, Toyota announced they would leave the IndyCar Series prematurely during the off-season.
