= Dallara IR-03 =

Open-wheel formula racing car built by Dallara

Dallara IR-03/04/05 Dallara IR-05
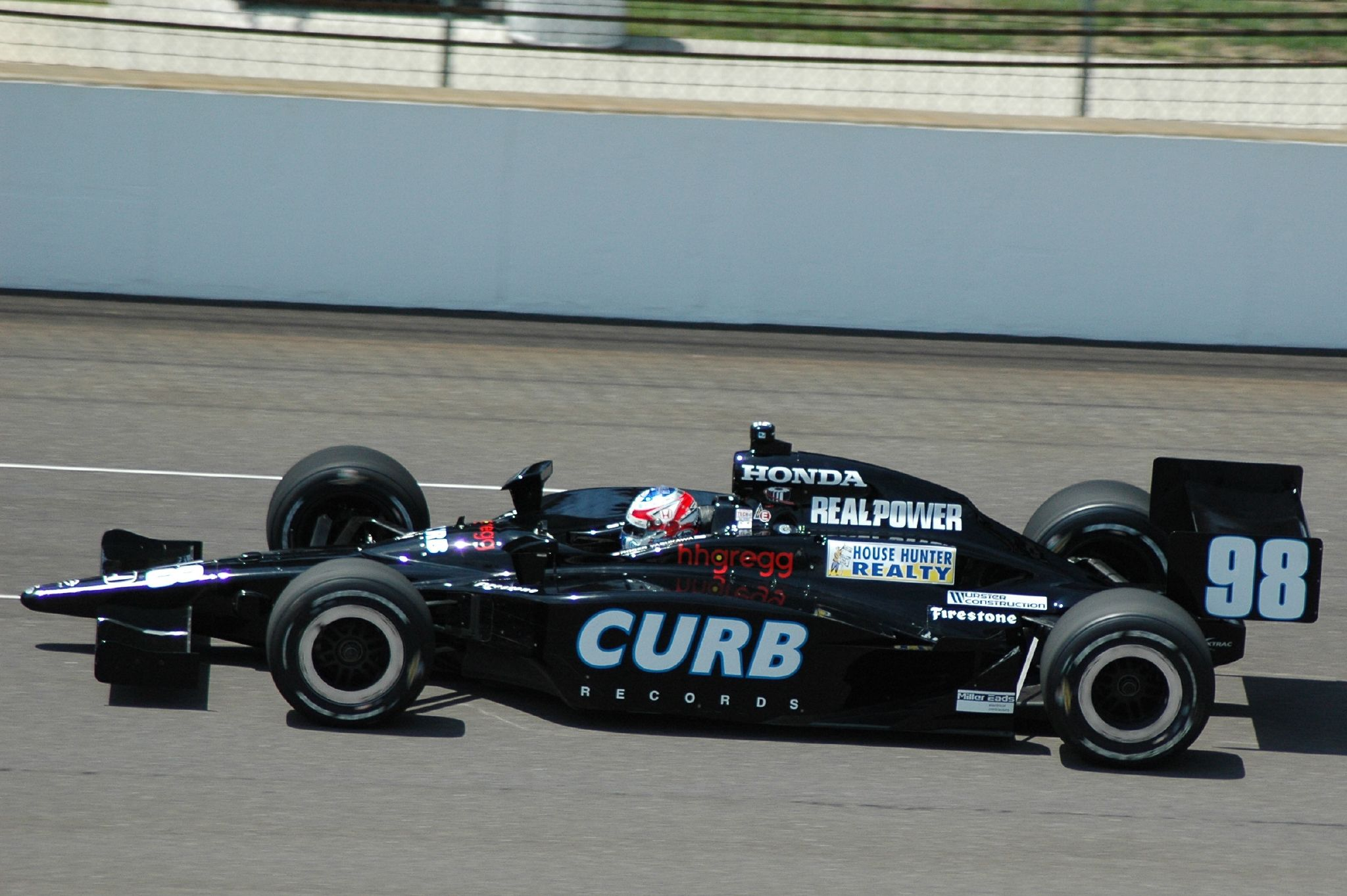
- Category: IndyCar Series
- Constructor: Dallara
- Predecessor: Dallara IR-02
- Successor: Dallara DW12

Technical specifications
- Chassis: Carbon fiber monocoque with honeycomb structure
- Suspension (front): double wishbones, pull rod actuated coil springs over shock absorbers
- Suspension (rear): double wishbones, push rod actuated coil springs over shock absorbers
- Length: 192 in (4,877 mm) on medium and long ovals; 196 in (4,978 mm) on short ovals and road/street courses
- Width: 77.5–78.5 in (1,968–1,994 mm) minimum (Road/Street)
- Wheelbase: 118–122 in (2,997–3,099 mm)
- Engine: Chevrolet Indy V8 (2003-2005), Honda Indy V8 (2003-2011) Toyota Indy V8 (2003-2005) 3.0–3.5 L (183–214 cu in) 90° N/A V8 with 4-stroke piston Otto cycle mid-engined, longitudinally-mounted
- Transmission: Xtrac #P295 6-speed sequential (2003-2008) later sequential semi-automatic paddle-shift (2008-2011) + no reverse (2003-2009), later 1 reverse (must have reverse only for road/street courses; 2010-2011)
- Power: ~ 650 horsepower (485 kilowatts) (2003-2008); 650 horsepower (485 kilowatts) + 20 horsepower (15 kilowatts) on push-to-pass (2009); 650 horsepower (485 kilowatts) + 40 horsepower (30 kilowatts) on push-to-pass 500.0 newton-metres (368.8 pound force-feet)
- Weight: 1,525–1,565 lb (692–710 kg) on ovals; 1,600–1,640 lb (726–744 kg) (road and street courses)
- Fuel: 100% methanol (2003-2005); EPIC 10% ethanol + 90% methanol (2006); EPIC 98% ethanol + 2% gasoline (2007-2009); Sunoco 98% ethanol + 2% gasoline (2010-2011)
- Lubricants: Various per teams
- Tyres: Firestone Firehawk

Competition history
- Debut: 2003 Toyota Indy 300
- Last event: IZOD IndyCar World Championship

The Dallara IR-03, and its evolution, the Dallara IR-04/05, is an open-wheel formula racing car developed and produced by Italian manufacturer Dallara for use in the IndyCar Series, between 2003 and 2011.

Starting from 2007 season, all IndyCar Series entrants (outside the Indy 500) utilized the IR-05 chassis version after Panoz defected to Champ Car World Series to replace Lola as the spec chassis supplier for that series in the same season. In 2009 one year after IndyCar unified with Champ Car all entrants (including entrants for the Indy 500) used the IR-05 making it the only chassis used in IndyCar from 2009 to 2011.

== Gallery ==
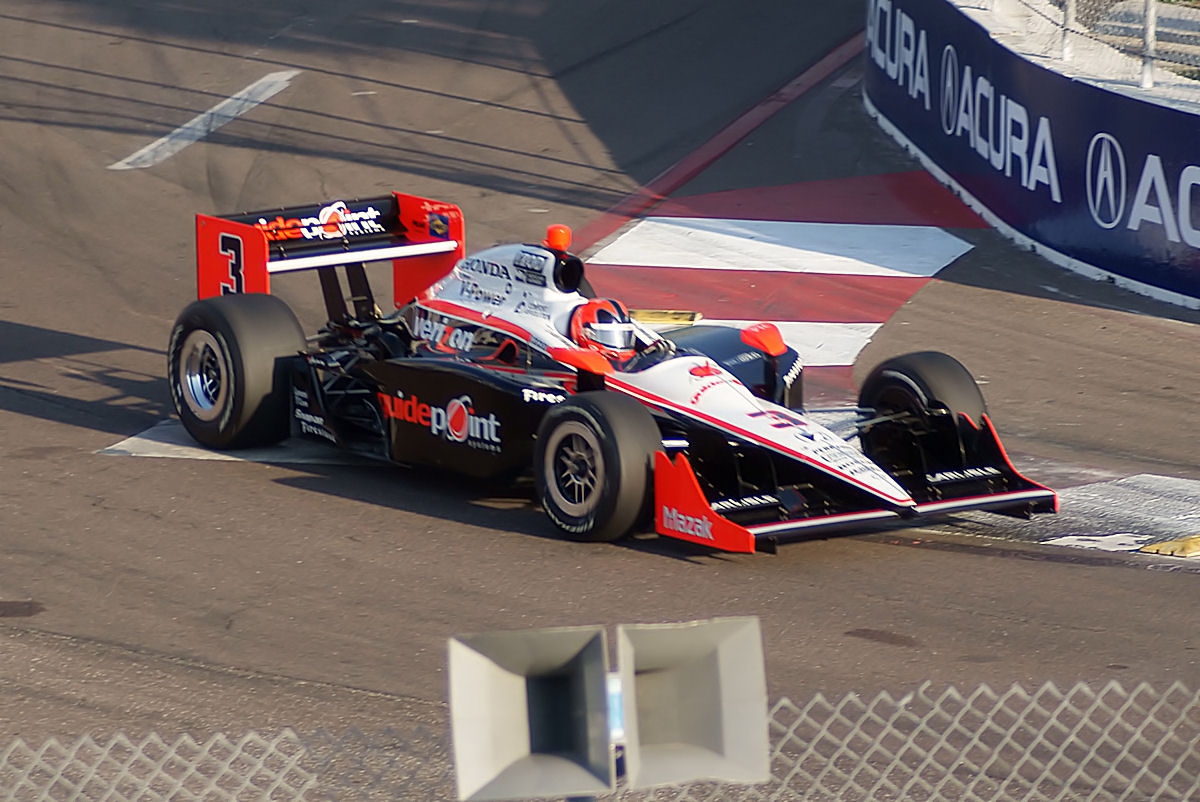
Helio's Castroneves' car

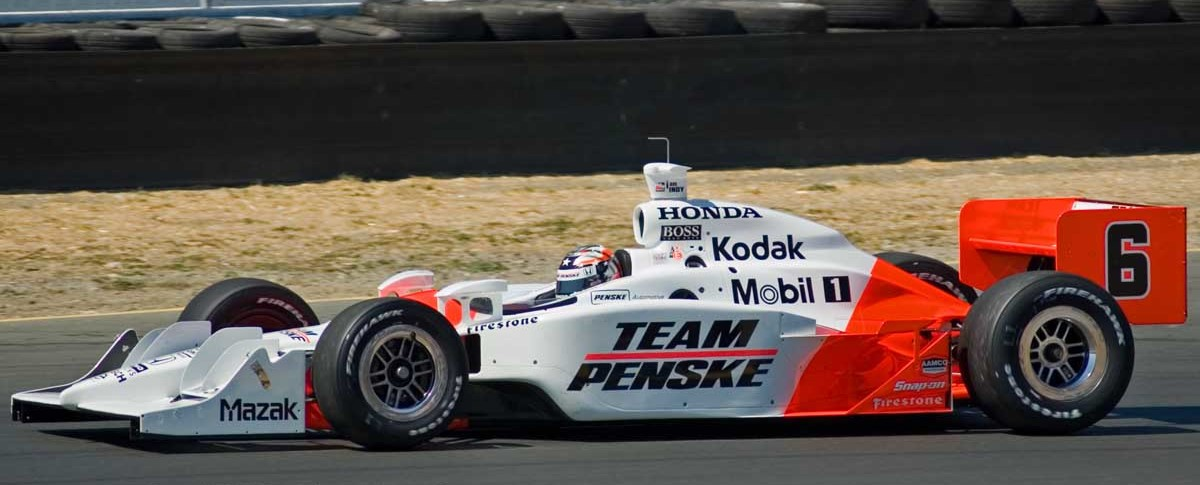
Sam Hornish Jr. at Sonoma Raceway in 2007

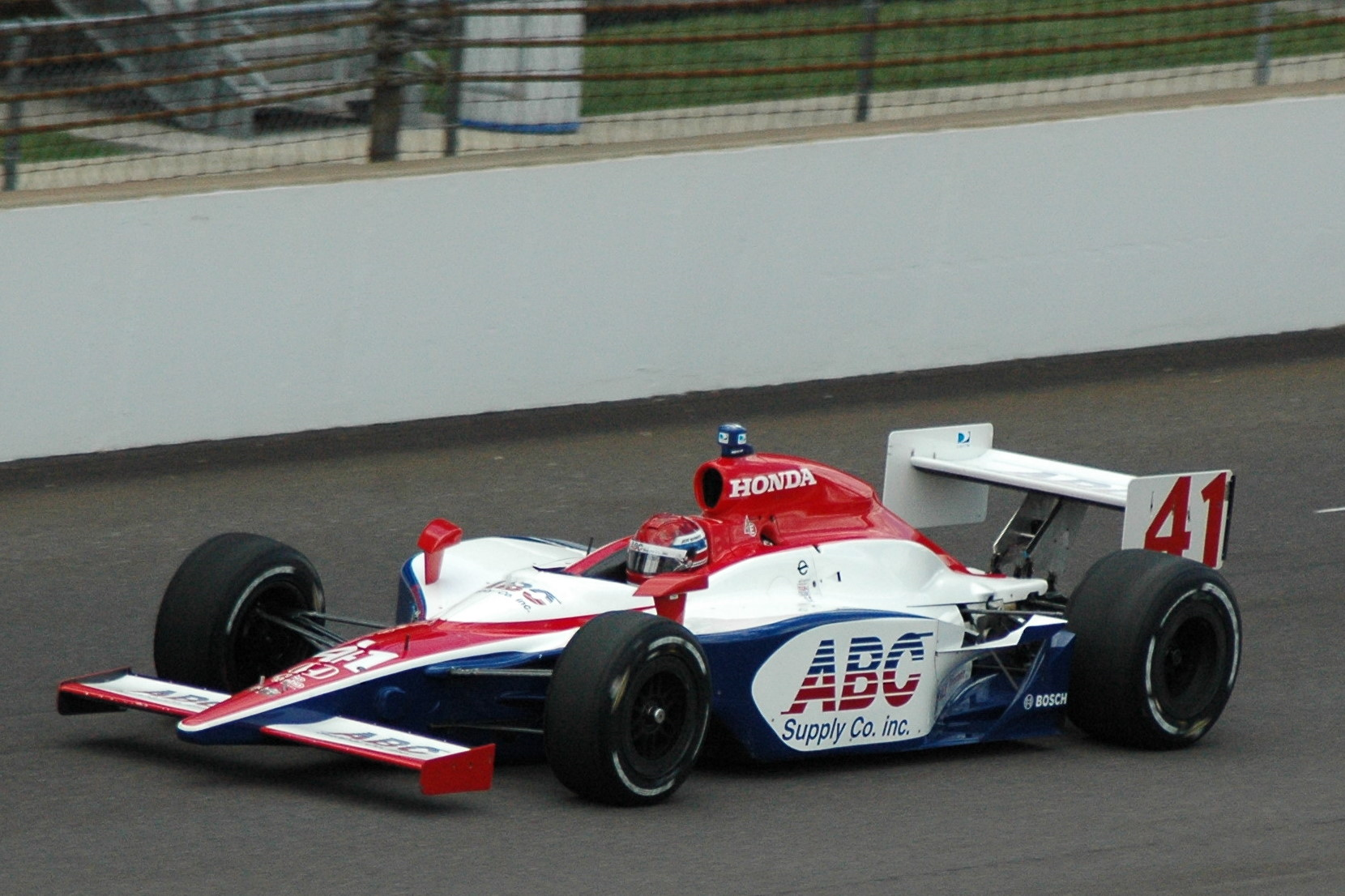
Jeff Simmon's car

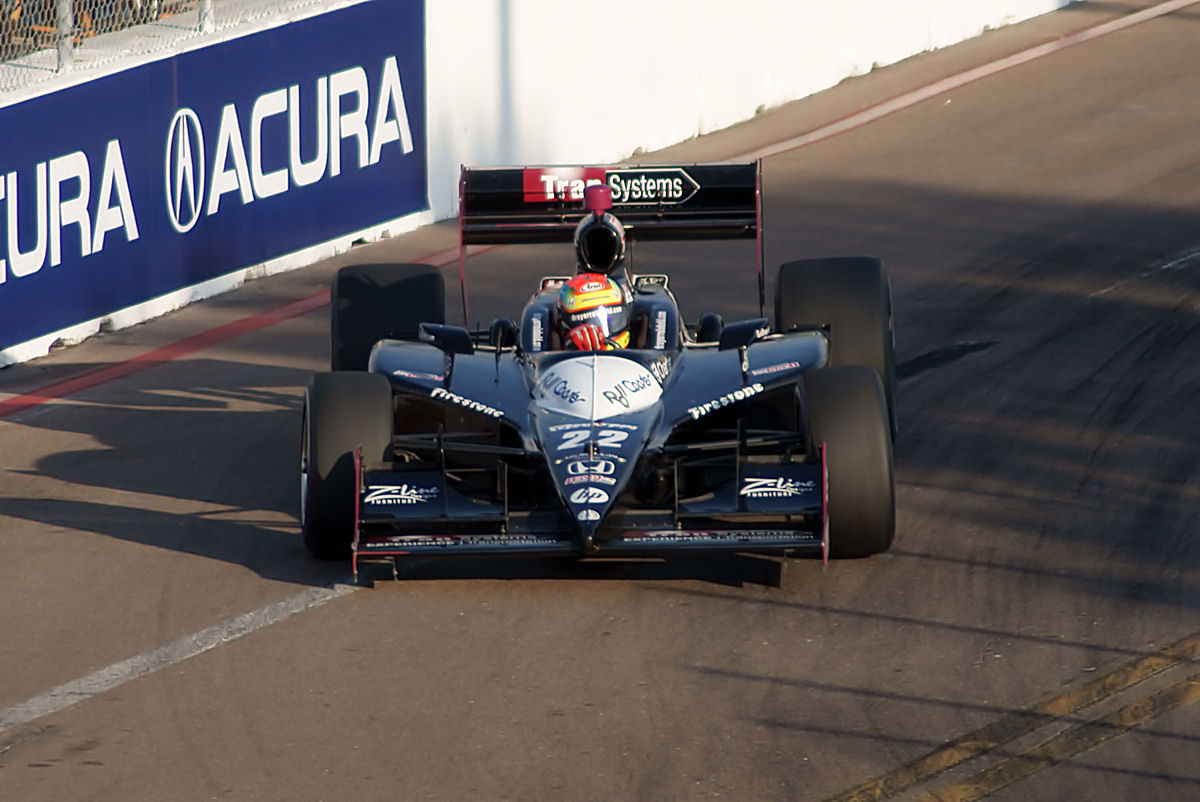
Justin Wilson's car

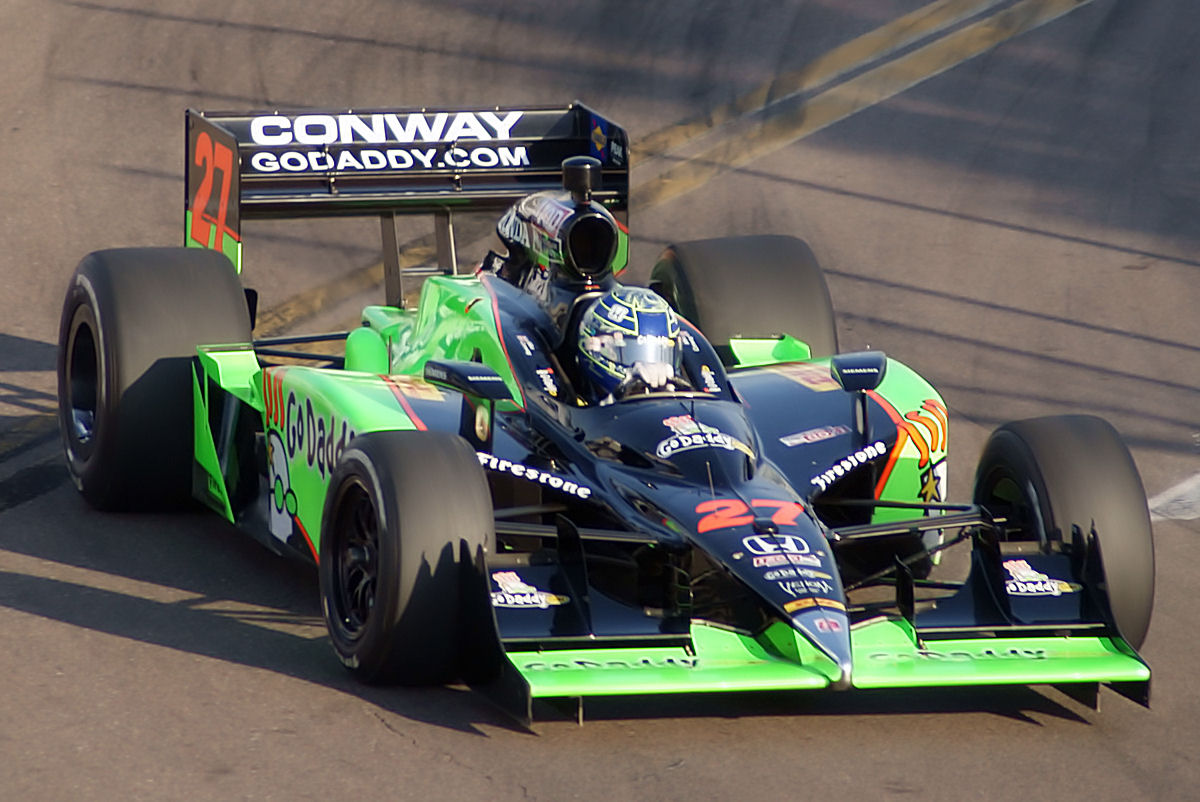
Mike Conway's car

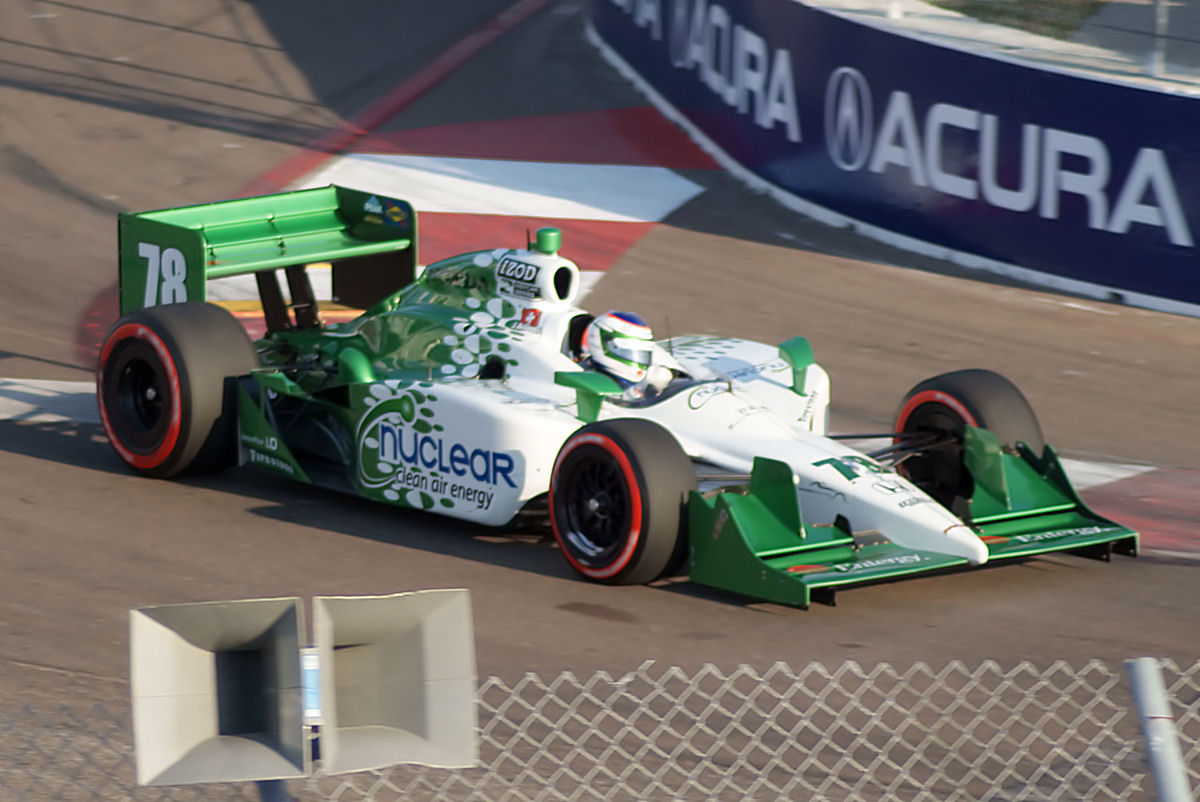
Simona De Silvestro's car

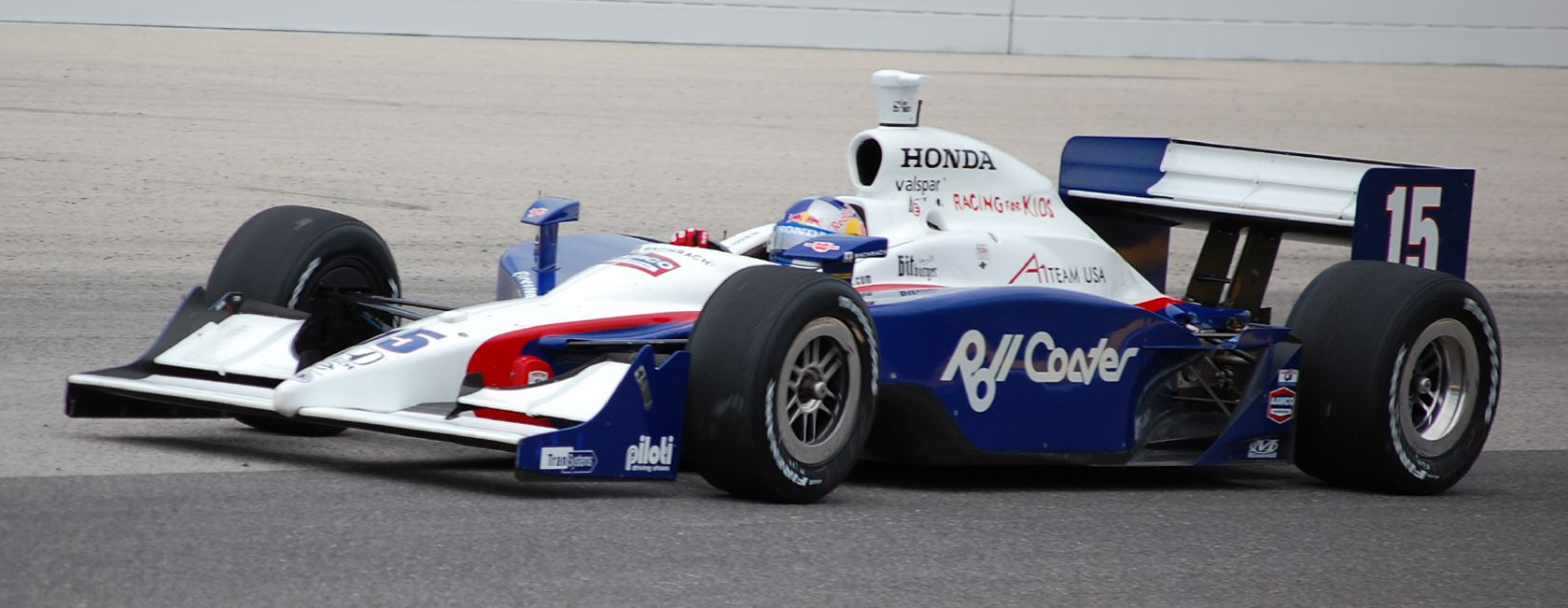
Dallara IR-05 at the Milwaukee Mile in 2007.

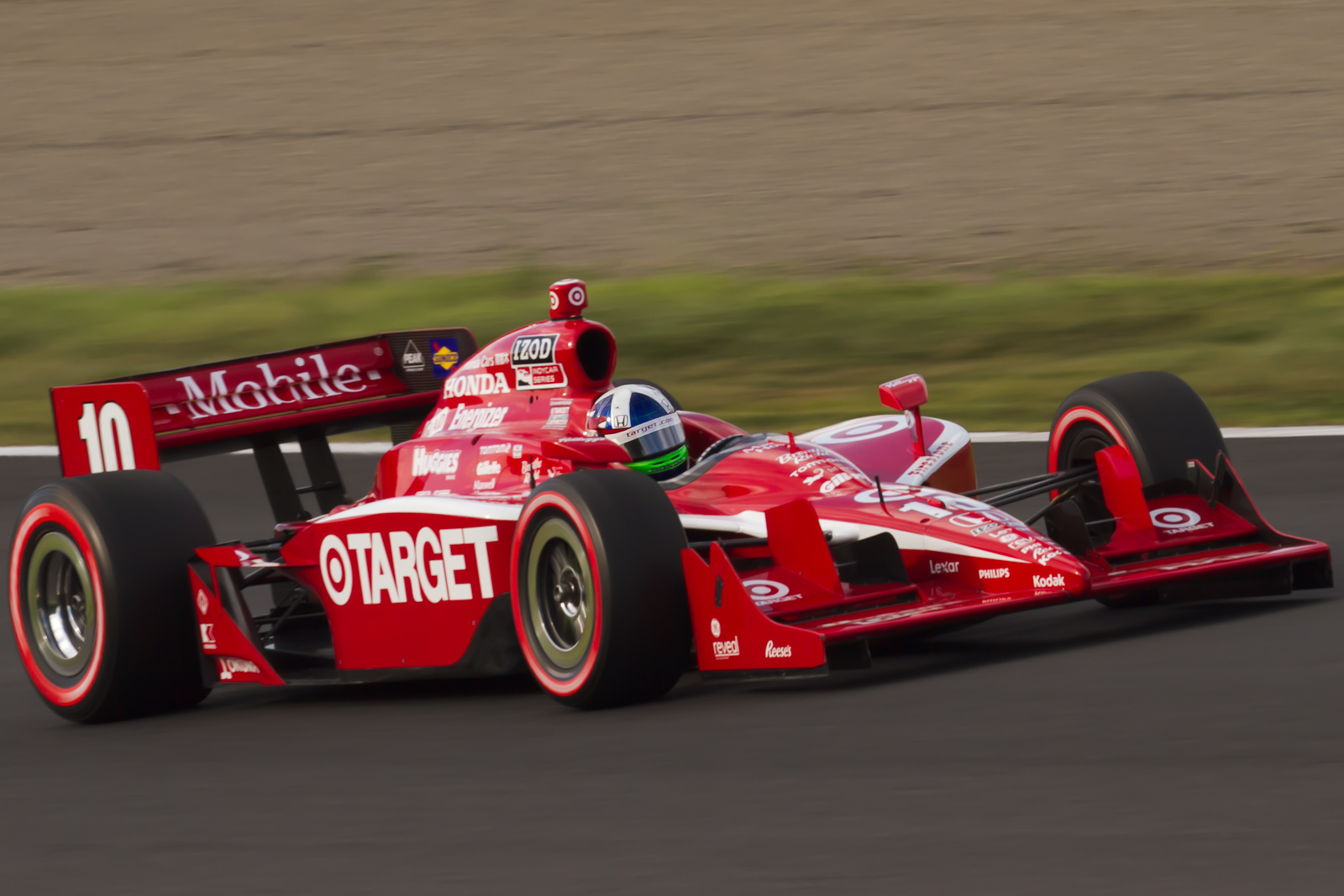
Dallara IR-05 qualifying at the 2011 Indy Japan 300

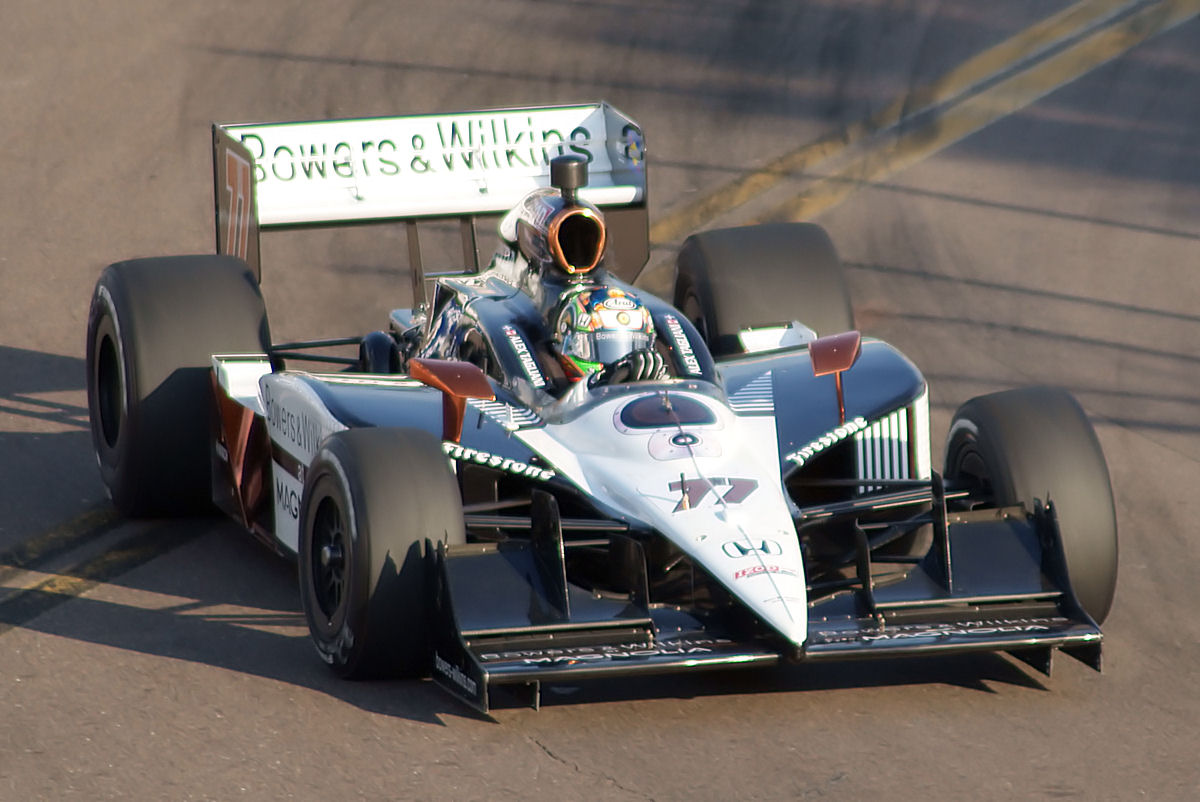
Alex Tagliani's car

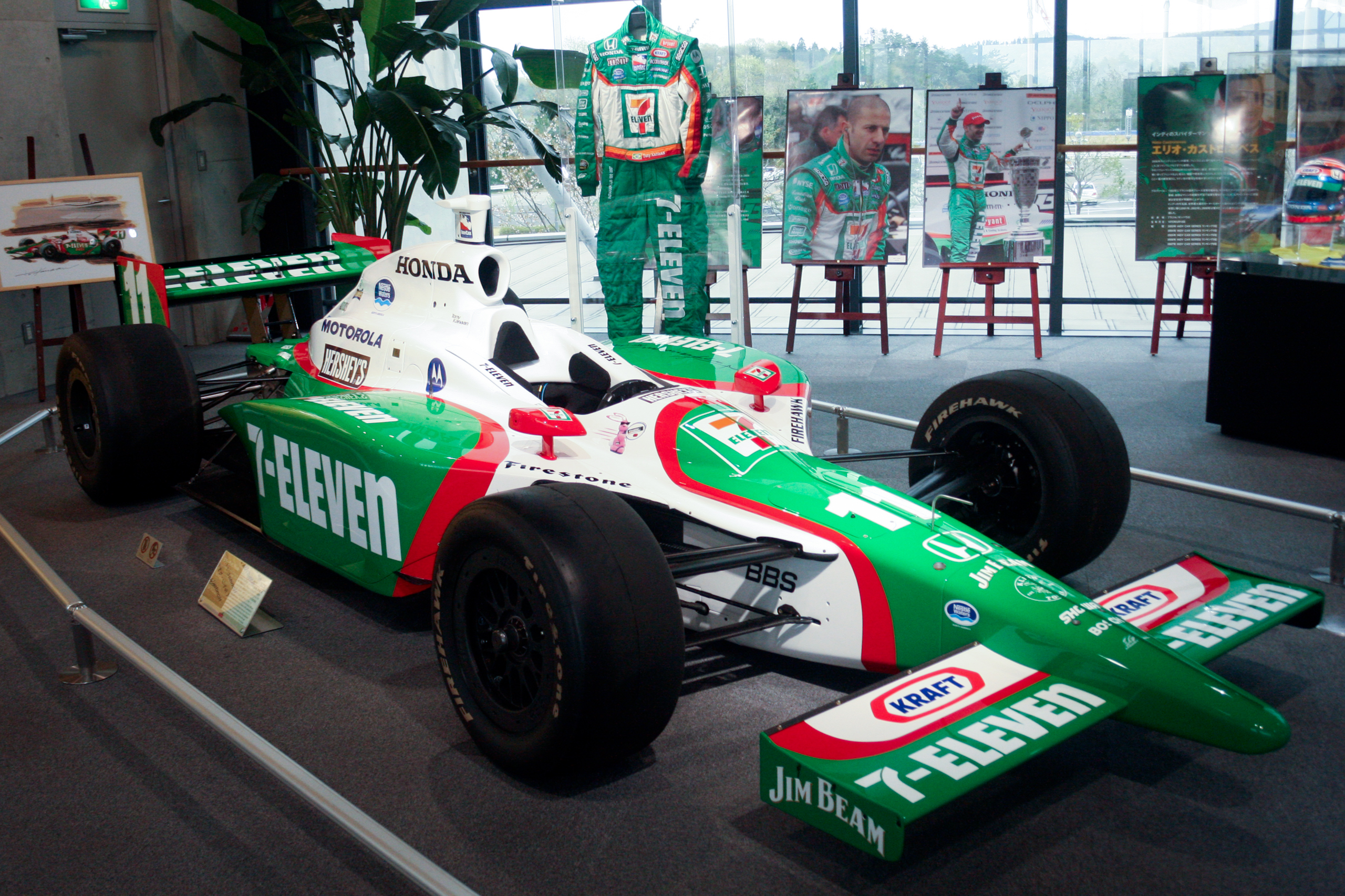
Tony Kanaan's 2004 car

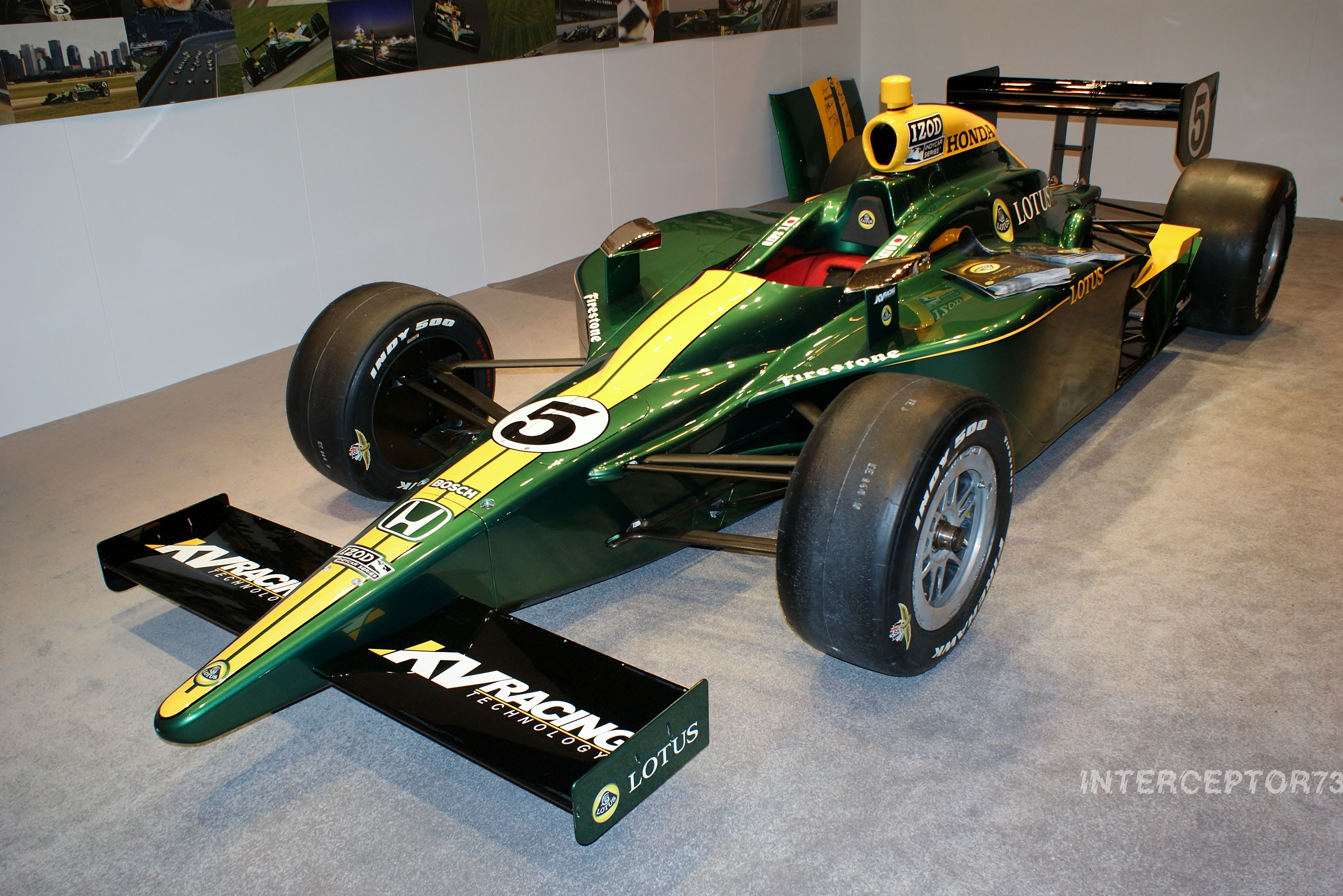
Takuma Sato's car
