= Gavin Ward =

Gavin Ward may refer to:

- Gavin Ward (footballer) (born 1970), English footballer
- Gavin Ward (musician), guitarist of Bolt Thrower
- Gavin Ward (engineer) (born 1984), Canadian engineer
