= 2005 Infiniti Pro Series =

2005 Infiniti Pro Series season
- Infiniti Pro Series

Season
- Races: 14
- Start date: March 6
- End date: October 16

Awards
- Drivers' champion: (New Zealand) Wade Cunningham
- Teams' champion: (United States) Brian Stewart Racing
- Rookie of the Year: (New Zealand) Wade Cunningham

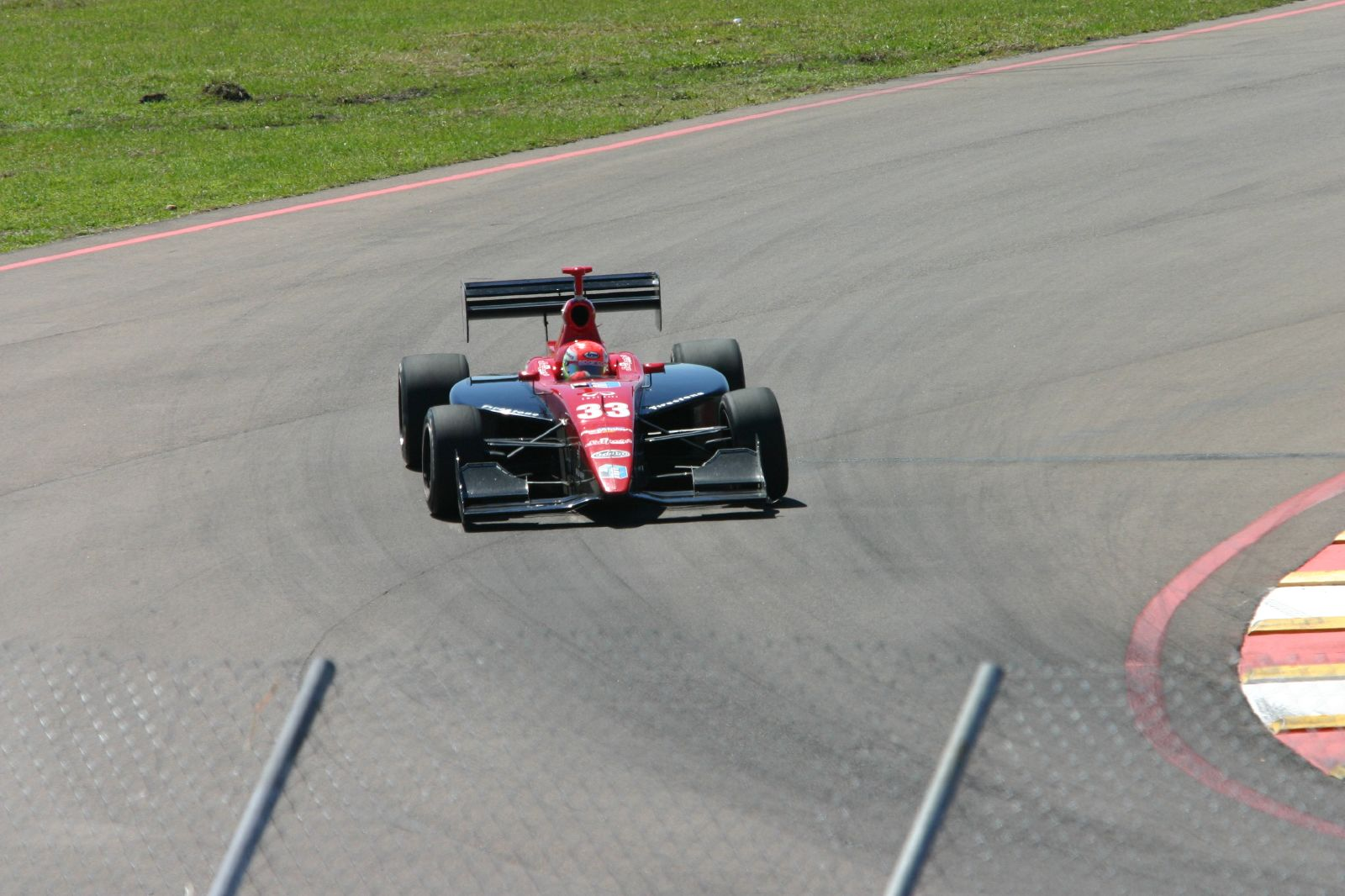
Champion Wade Cunningham at St. Petersburg

Infiniti Pro Series logo.

The 2005 Menards Infiniti Pro Series was the fourth season of the series under the Indy Racing League ownership, and the 20th in Indy NXT combined history, as officially recognized by IndyCar. All teams used Dallara IL-02 chassis and Infiniti engines, a combination that was raced for the first time on road courses.

In a consistent, and almost winless, rookie year, Wade Cunningham became the champion by scoring his only win of the year in the final round at California Speedway. Driving for the storied Brian Stewart Racing, Cunningham led the championship from the sixth round, despite not scoring a win or a pole position in the first 12 races. At the end of the year, he had a total of 10 podium finishes, seven of those in second place.

Jeff Simmons returned to the series full-time, and recovered from a bad first half of the season to score four wins. He repeated his second place finish in the standings from 2003 by beating Travis Gregg, who scored a field-record six pole positions and won three races with defending champions Sam Schmidt Motorsports. Jaime Camara, also driving for Schmidt, won the Freedom 100 from pole position ahead of Cunningham, adding another win at Nashville to finish fifth behind fellow rookie Nick Bussell.

With the introduction of road course racing in the IRL IndyCar Series, the Infiniti Pro Series followed suit with four road course races, including his first race outside of the IndyCar bill, the Liberty Challenge held at the Indianapolis road course during the controversial U. S. Grand Prix weekend. Driving a partial schedule, 18-year old Marco Andretti set the standard at the road course races with three wins, being only beaten by Simmons at Watkins Glen. These results, along with a podium finish at Kentucky, were enough to finish 10th in the standings before his IndyCar promotion.

Five years after Team Green left Indy Lights, Andretti Green Racing entered the Infiniti Pro Series for the first time at selected rounds. Newly formed IndyCar team Vision Racing also entered the series, while Roth Racing and Racing Professionals went on to contest the full season. Genoa Racing returned and J. L. West Motorsports also entered from the beginning with both teams downsizing halfway through the year, while Michael Crawford Motorsports also debuted with a partial schedule. On the other hand, Mo Nunn Racing's Pro Series operation was disbanded along with the main team, and both Keith Duesenberg Racing and Roquin Motorsports left the series.

The series had at least 11 drivers at each round, with 15 competitors at Phoenix and 18 drivers in the Freedom 100. Eight drivers competed in every race, plus Jay Drake at all but one race. At Chicagoland, Sarah McCune became the first woman in series history to score a pole, this being the only start of her career. Marty Roth competed again in both the Indianapolis 500 and the Freedom 100, where he was one of three starters with previous IndyCar experience along with Simmons and Jon Herb, the winner at Phoenix earlier in the year.

== Team and driver chart ==
Team	No.	Drivers	Rounds
Sam Schmidt Motorsports	1	(Brazil) Jaime Camara	All
Sam Schmidt Motorsports	7	(United States) Travis Gregg	All
Sam Schmidt Motorsports	8	(United States) Sarah McCune	12
Sam Schmidt Motorsports	11	(Canada) Tom Wood	4
Sam Schmidt Motorsports	11	(United States) P. J. Abbott	5, 14
Sam Schmidt Motorsports	11	(United States) Rocco DeSimone	13
Sam Schmidt Motorsports	19	(United States) Chris Festa	All
Brian Stewart Racing	3	(United States) Alfred Unser	1–4
Brian Stewart Racing	3	(Netherlands) Arie Luyendyk Jr.	5–10
Brian Stewart Racing	3	(United States) Bobby Wilson	11–14
Brian Stewart Racing	33	(New Zealand) Wade Cunningham	All
Roth Racing	4	(Canada) Marty Roth	All
AFS Racing	5	(Netherlands) Arie Luyendyk Jr.	2–3
AFS Racing	25	(Netherlands) Arie Luyendyk Jr.	14
AFS Racing	27	(United States) G. J. Mennen	2
AFS Racing	27	(United States) Rocky Moran Jr.	4
AFS Racing	27	(United States) Geoff Dodge	14
Racing Professionals	6	(United States) Jon Herb	All
Vision Racing	9	(United States) Ed Carpenter	6
Vision Racing	9	(United States) Nick Bussell	7–14
Vision Racing	20	(United States) Jay Drake	1–12, 14
Vision Racing	20	(United States) Phil Giebler	13
Michael Crawford Motorsports	11	(United States) Scott Mayer	2, 8, 11–12
J. L. West Motorsports	21	(United States) Nick Bussell	1–6
Dave McMillan Racing	22	(United Kingdom) Scott Mansell	11, 13
Bullet-Team Motorsports	23	(United States) Taylor Fletcher	4, 14
Kenn Hardley Racing	24	(United States) Jeff Simmons	All
Kenn Hardley Racing	42	(Mexico) Germán Quiroga	4
Kenn Hardley Racing	42	(Canada) Tom Wood	7, 10
Andretti Green Racing	26	(United States) Marco Andretti	3–4, 6, 9, 11, 13
Genoa Racing	36	(United States) P. J. Chesson	1–3
Genoa Racing	36	(India) Imran Husain	4
Genoa Racing	36	(United States) Larry Connor	6, 13
Hemelgarn Racing	42	(United States) Mishael Abbott	1
Hemelgarn Racing	91	(United States) Mishael Abbott	2, 4, 6
Hemelgarn Racing	91	(United States) Jerry Coons Jr.	7
American Revolution Racing	77	(United States) Cole Carter	4

== Schedule ==
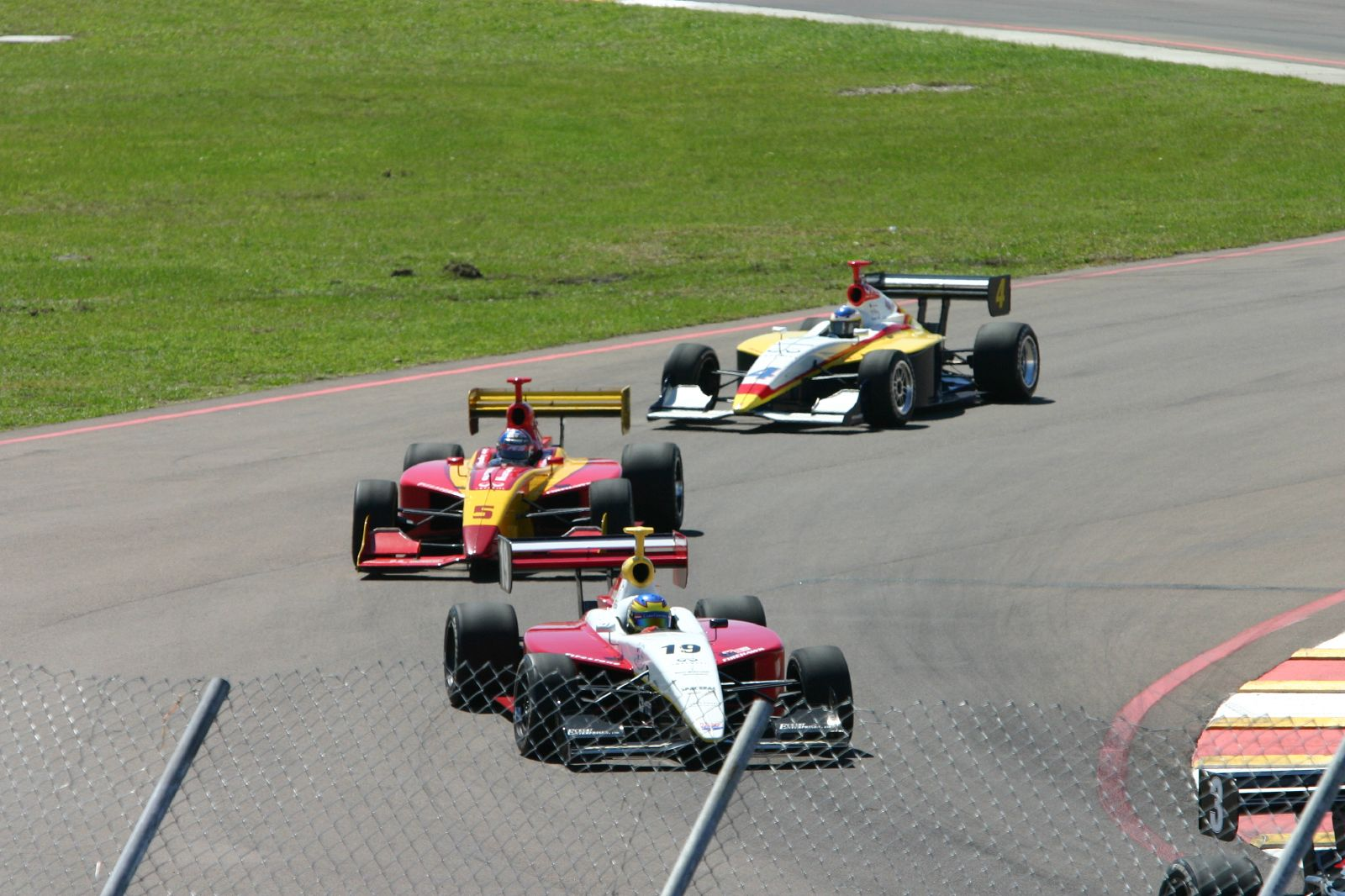
Chris Festa, Arie Luyendyk Jr., and Marty Roth

The Infiniti Pro Series accompanied the new IndyCar road course events at St. Petersburg, Sonoma and Watkins Glen, while also adding a fourth road course event in Indianapolis as part of the Formula 1 United States Grand Prix bill. The oval races at Kansas and Michigan were removed from the schedule, which grew from 12 events to 14. The Texas date was moved to June after the fall event was discontinued by IndyCar, with California Speedway serving as the venue for the season finale.

Rd.	Date	Race name	Track	Location
1	March 6	Homestead-Miami 100	O Homestead–Miami Speedway	Homestead, Florida
2	March 19	Phoenix 100	O Phoenix International Raceway	Avondale, Arizona
3	April 3	Grand Prix of St. Petersburg	R Streets of St. Petersburg	St. Petersburg, Florida
4	May 27	Futaba Freedom 100	O Indianapolis Motor Speedway	Speedway, Indiana
5	June 11	Firestone 100	O Texas Motor Speedway	Fort Worth, Texas
6	June 18	Liberty Challenge	R Indianapolis Motor Speedway road course	Speedway, Indiana
7	July 16	Cleanevent 100	O Nashville Superspeedway	Lebanon, Tennessee
8	July 24	Milwaukee 100	O Milwaukee Mile	West Allis, Wisconsin
9	August 13	Bluegrass 100	O Kentucky Speedway	Sparta, Kentucky
10	August 21	Pikes Peak 100	O Pikes Peak International Raceway	Fountain, Colorado
11	August 28	Sonoma 100	R Infineon Raceway	Sonoma, California
12	September 11	Chicagoland 100	O Chicagoland Speedway	Joliet, Illinois
13	September 25	Corning 100	R Watkins Glen International	Watkins Glen, New York
14	October 16	California 100	O California Speedway	Fontana, California

O Oval/Speedway
R Road/Street course

== Race results ==
Round	Race	Pole position	Fastest lap	Most laps led	Race Winner	
Round	Race	Pole position	Fastest lap	Most laps led	Driver	Team
1	Homestead–Miami Speedway	(United States) Travis Gregg	(New Zealand) Wade Cunningham	(United States) Travis Gregg	(United States) Travis Gregg	Sam Schmidt Motorsports
2	Phoenix International Raceway	(United States) Travis Gregg	(United States) Chris Festa	(United States) Jon Herb	(United States) Jon Herb	Racing Professionals
3	Streets of St. Petersburg	(United States) Marco Andretti	(New Zealand) Wade Cunningham	(United States) Marco Andretti	(United States) Marco Andretti	Andretti Green Racing
4	Indianapolis Motor Speedway	(Brazil) Jaime Camara	(United States) Jon Herb	(Brazil) Jaime Camara	(Brazil) Jaime Camara	Sam Schmidt Motorsports
5	Texas Motor Speedway	(United States) Travis Gregg	(United States) Nick Bussell	(United States) Travis Gregg	(United States) Travis Gregg	Sam Schmidt Motorsports
6	Indianapolis Motor Speedway Road Course	(United States) Marco Andretti	(United States) Marco Andretti	(United States) Marco Andretti	(United States) Marco Andretti	Andretti Green Racing
7	Nashville Superspeedway	(Brazil) Jaime Camara	(Netherlands) Arie Luyendyk Jr.	(Brazil) Jaime Camara	(Brazil) Jaime Camara	Sam Schmidt Motorsports
8	Milwaukee Mile	(Brazil) Jaime Camara	(United States) Jay Drake	(New Zealand) Wade Cunningham	(United States) Jeff Simmons	Kenn Hardley Racing
9	Kentucky Speedway	(United States) Travis Gregg	(United States) Jay Drake	(United States) Travis Gregg	(United States) Travis Gregg	Sam Schmidt Motorsports
10	Pikes Peak International Raceway	(United States) Travis Gregg	(United States) Travis Gregg	(United States) Jeff Simmons	(United States) Jeff Simmons	Kenn Hardley Racing
11	Infineon Raceway	(United States) Marco Andretti	(United States) Jeff Simmons	(United States) Marco Andretti	(United States) Marco Andretti	Andretti Green Racing
12	Chicagoland Speedway	(United States) Sarah McCune	(United States) Jon Herb	(United States) Jeff Simmons	(United States) Jeff Simmons	Kenn Hardley Racing
13	Watkins Glen International	(New Zealand) Wade Cunningham	(New Zealand) Wade Cunningham	(United States) Marco Andretti	(United States) Jeff Simmons	Kenn Hardley Racing
14	California Speedway	(United States) Travis Gregg	(United States) Jeff Simmons	(New Zealand) Wade Cunningham	(New Zealand) Wade Cunningham	Brian Stewart Racing

== Championship standings ==
=== Drivers' Championship ===
Scoring system

Position	**1st**	**2nd**	**3rd**	**4th**	**5th**	**6th**	**7th**	**8th**	**9th**	**10th**	**11th**	**12th**	**13th**	**14th**	**15th**	**16th**	**17th**	**18th**	**19th**
Points	50	40	35	32	30	28	26	24	22	20	19	18	17	16	15	14	13	12	11

- The driver who starts on pole is awarded one point.
- The driver who leads the most laps in a race is awarded two additional points.

Pos	Driver	HOM	PHX	STP	INDY	TXS	IMS	NSH	MIL	KEN	PIK	SON	CHI	WGL	FON	Points
1	(New Zealand) Wade Cunningham RY	4	3	2	2	2	2	4	2*	2	5	2	10	**3**	1*	504 (Note: 15 point deduction for reckless and overly-aggressive driving at California)
2	(United States) Jeff Simmons	9	12	12	7	8	13	2	1	5	1*	3	1*	1	2	474
3	(United States) Travis Gregg R	**1***	**6**	6	6	**1***	7	10	8	**1***	**3**	6	5	12	**3**	462
4	(United States) Nick Bussell R	6	5	3	15	5	4	5	3	6	2	4	3	5	5	430
5	(Brazil) Jaime Camara R	2	11	13	**1***	9	5	**1***	**5**	8	9	12	6	7	10	403
6	(United States) Chris Festa	10	2	8	8	3	3	7	10	9	6	5	11	4	4	387
7	(United States) Jon Herb	3	1*	11	13	7	9	6	4	11	11	9	4	11	9	364
8	(Canada) Marty Roth	7	10	9	5	6	8	11	9	7	7	7	2	10	7	355
9	(United States) Jay Drake R	5	13	10	3	4	10	3	6	4	8	8	7		12	341
10	(United States) Marco Andretti R			**1***	16		**1***			3		**1***		2*		250
11	(Netherlands) Arie Luyendyk Jr.		4	5		10	6	8	7	10	10				6	228
12	(United States) Alfred Unser	12	8	4	4											106
13	(United States) Mishael Abbott R	8	9		11		12									83
14	(United States) Bobby Wilson R											11	8	9	13	82
15	(United States) Scott Mayer R		7						11			13	12			80
16	(Canada) Tom Wood				12			12			4					68
17	(United States) P. J. Chesson	11	14	7												61
18	(United States) P. J. Abbott R					11									8	43
19	(United States) Taylor Fletcher				9										11	41
20	(United States) Larry Connor R						14							8		40
21	(United Kingdom) Scott Mansell R											10		14		36
22	(United States) Phil Giebler													6		28
23	(United States) Sarah McCune R												**9**			23
24	(United States) Jerry Coons Jr. R							9								22
25	(Mexico) Germán Quiroga R				10											20
26	(United States) Ed Carpenter						11									19
27	(United States) Rocco DeSimone R													13		17
28	(India) Imran Husain R				14											16
29	(United States) Geoff Dodge R														14	16
30	(United States) G. J. Mennen		15													15
31	(United States) Rocky Moran Jr.				17											13
32	(United States) Cole Carter R				18											12
Pos	Driver	HOM	PHX	STP	INDY	TXS	IMS	NSH	MIL	KEN	PIK	SON	CHI	WGL	FON	Points

Color	Result
Gold	Winner
Silver	2nd place
Bronze	3rd place
Green	4th & 5th place
Light Blue	6th–10th place
Dark Blue	Finished (Outside Top 10)
Purple	Did not finish
Red	Did not qualify (DNQ)
Brown	Withdrawn (Wth)
Black	Disqualified (DSQ)
White	Did not start (DNS)
Blank	Did not participate (DNP)
Blank	Not competing

**In-line notation**
**Bold**	Pole position (1 point)
Italics	Ran fastest race lap
*	Led most race laps (2 points)
^{1}	Qualifying cancelled

- Ties in points broken by number of wins, or best finishes.
