= Arrow McLaren =

American racecar team

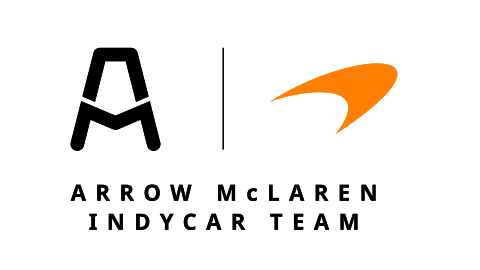
- Owner(s): McLaren Racing
- Principal(s): Zak Brown (chairman); Tony Kanaan (team principal)
- Base: Indianapolis, Indiana, United States
- Series: IndyCar Series
- Race drivers: 5. (Mexico) Pato O'Ward; 6. (New Zealand) Scott Dixon; 7. (Sweden) Felix Rosenqvist; 31. (United States) Ryan Hunter-Reay (part-time)
- Manufacturer: Chevrolet

Career
- Debut: 2001 Pennzoil Copper World Indy 200 (Phoenix)
- Latest race: 2026 Mission Grand Prix of Monterey (Laguna Seca)
- Drivers' Championships: Indy Lights: 2004: Thiago Medeiros; 2006: Jay Howard; 2007: Alex Lloyd; 2010: Jean-Karl Vernay; 2011: Josef Newgarden; 2012: Tristan Vautier; 2013: Sage Karam
- Indy 500 victories: 0
- Race victories: 12
- Pole positions: 11

The IndyCar Series operation of McLaren, competing as Arrow McLaren IndyCar Team due to sponsorship, is based in Indianapolis and was founded by former IndyCar driver Sam Schmidt in 2001 as Sam Schmidt Motorsports (SSM). The team operates the Nos. 5, 6 and 7 Dallara-Chevrolet entries for Pato O'Ward, Scott Dixon, and Felix Rosenqvist respectively.

After initial struggles as SSM, the organization would find moderate success after former IndyCar driver Davey Hamilton brought enough sponsorship to run a full schedule, then Canadian businessman Ric Peterson purchased a stake in the team. In this period, from 2012 to 2019, the organization would score seven wins with drivers Simon Pagenaud and James Hinchcliffe.

McLaren has a history of competing in American open wheel racing, as both an entrant and a chassis constructor. As an entrant, McLaren won the Indianapolis 500 in 1974 and 1976, with a McLaren chassis also winning in 1972. Following one-off Indy 500 returns in 2017 and 2019, the latter of which they did not qualify for, McLaren announced plans to compete in the full IndyCar Series starting in 2020 in partnership with the Schmidt Peterson team.

Following two wins in 2021 with O'Ward, McLaren Racing announced it had purchased a 75% stake in Schmidt Peterson Motorsports with its CEO Zak Brown named chairman, increasing to 100% after 2024.

== History ==
=== Schmidt's injury and team origins ===
On January 6, 2000, Sam Schmidt was in Orlando, Florida practicing at the Walt Disney World Speedway when his car crashed exiting turn two, hitting the outside wall at approximately 180 mph. Schmidt was airlifted to a nearby hospital in extremely critical condition. He was diagnosed as a quadriplegic, the result of a severe injury to his spinal cord at the C-3/C-4 levels and was on a respirator for 5 months. In 2001, 14 months after his accident, Schmidt announced the formation of Sam Schmidt Motorsports.

=== Ownership and name changes ===
In 2012, the team was renamed to Schmidt Hamilton Motorsports after fellow ex-driver Davey Hamilton brought the team enough sponsorship to continue racing in IndyCar full-time. Canadian businessman Ric Peterson purchased a stake in the team in 2013 to form Schmidt Peterson Motorsports. In 2019, primary sponsor Arrow Electronics became the title sponsor for the team, resulting in the Arrow Schmidt Peterson Motorsports banner for that year.

For 2020, the team reached an agreement with McLaren Racing to become a joint entry, with the combined team being known as Arrow McLaren SP. Schmidt and Peterson remained as the sole co-owners until McLaren purchased a 75% stake after the 2021 season, with McLaren CEO Zak Brown installed as chairman. Schmidt and Peterson held the remaining 25% stake in the team through 2024. For the 2023 season, the team dropped the "SP" branding to become Arrow McLaren IndyCar Team. In January 2025, McLaren purchased all remaining stakes from Schmidt and Peterson to complete their takeover of the team.

=== Facilities and Team Infrastructure ===
In 2026, Arrow McLaren expanded its Indianapolis base with the opening of the McLaren Racing Center, a newly renovated $30 million facility that increased the team's footprint from approximately 33,000 sq ft to around 86,000 sq ft to support improved workflow and collaboration among mechanics, engineers, and other staff. The new McLaren Racing Center also features 12 dedicated car bays, indoor space for all team haulers, a pit-stop practice area, office space, and an integrated gym and recovery facility for athletes.

== IndyCar Series ==
Davey Hamilton began 2001 in the car and drove five races, including the team's first Indianapolis 500, ending with an injury at Texas Motor Speedway. He was replaced by Jaques Lazier who drove four races and three other drivers who drove a few races each. Richie Hearn made nine starts for the team in 2002 as he switched between the team's two cars, the No. 99 and No. 20. Anthony Lazzaro drove in the first three races of the year in the No. 99, but handed over Indy 500 driving duties to Mark Dismore, who made his only start for the team in that year's '500'.

Also, in 2002, the Indy Pro Series was founded and Schmidt eventually refocused its efforts on that series, running only the Indy 500 as its sole IndyCar series race with a car driven from 2003 to 2005 by Hearn and in 2006 by Airton Daré. In 2007 the team fielded a car in the Indy 500 for Buddy Lazier. In 2008, while the team did not field a car of its own, it prepared and engineered Rubicon Race Team's entry for Max Papis that failed to qualify after suffering numerous gearbox problems during qualifying. The team made a joint entry with Chip Ganassi Racing for the 2009 Indianapolis 500, piloted by Alex Lloyd. The arrangement with Chip Ganassi continued in 2010 for the Indy 500 with Townsend Bell driving.

For 2011, SSM purchased the assets of FAZZT Race Team, retaining some of the personnel and all sponsors, including Alex Tagliani. Townsend Bell, Jay Howard, and Wade Cunningham also drove for SSM in the 2011 IndyCar Series season.

Chris Griffis, the team manager for Sam Schmidt Motorsports' Indy Lights team, died on September 12, 2011. He was 46. Just over a month later, at the 2011 season finale, Dan Wheldon died after he was involved in a 15-car wreck at Las Vegas Motor Speedway. Wheldon was driving the No. 77 in a joint deal between SSM and Bryan Herta Autosport.

In 2012 SSM fielded a car for Frenchman Simon Pagenaud for the full season backed by Hewlett-Packard. Davey Hamilton joined Schmidt to field the number 77 car. Pagenaud went on to win the IZOD IndyCar Rookie of the Year Award. Pagenaud would score four podiums that year, while Bell returned for the Indianapolis 500" finishing 9th.

In 2013, Pagenaud would be teamed with another Frenchman, Tristan Vautier, for the season. Schmidt would also bring on another investor, former Champ Car Atlantic owner Ric Peterson. While Vautier had a best finish of 10th, Pagenaud would score two wins for Schmidt at Detroit Round 2 and Baltimore, finishing third in points. Vautier was released at the end of 2013 and replaced by Russian driver Mikhail Aleshin. Pagenaud would go on to win the inaugural GP of Indianapolis and finish 5th in points. Aleshin would carry multiple top-10 finishes with a best finish of second at Houston round 2. However, a crash at Fontana ruled him out of the finale, and visa restrictions forced Aleshin to sit out 2015. Pagenaud would leave for Team Penske, with SPM taking on James Hinchcliffe and James Jakes. While the team would have a 1-3 finish at 2015 Indy Grand Prix of Louisiana with Hinchcliffe winning, the season would come undone at Indianapolis. During qualifying. Hinchcliffe crashed hard in turns 1-2 and was airlifted to a hospital. Eventually forced out due to his injuries, Ryan Briscoe and Conor Daly (who drove a No. 43 car at the Indy 500) shared the car for the remainder of the year.

For 2016, Hinchcliffe and Aleshin (who drove a third No. 77 car at the 2015 season finale at Sonoma) would return to SPM. While neither driver scored a victory, Hinchcliffe would lose a close battle in Texas to Graham Rahal, while Aleshin would win his first pole at Pocono Raceway and Hinchcliffe sat on the pole for the 100th Indianapolis 500. The No. 77 would return for Indy, with Jay Howard driving with support from Tony Stewart. The team's lineup would remain unchanged for 2017. While Hinchcliffe would win at Long Beach, Aleshin would struggle heavily during his second year. During the Road America weekend, Aleshin was delayed by visa issues coming from France (where he participated in the 24 Hours of Le Mans). Deutsche Tourenwagen Masters driver Robert Wickens filled in for Aleshin during practice, though Aleshin later arrived at the track and raced. By Toronto, Aleshin was parked by SPM and replaced by Sebastián Saavedra. It was announced on August 12 that Aleshin would no longer race for SPM and would be replaced by Saavedra and Jack Harvey for the remainder of the season.

In 2018, SPM announced it had extended James Hinchcliffe's contract, as well as signing fellow Canadian Robert Wickens to drive the No. 7 (later renumbered to No. 6) for 2018. Leena Gade became Hinchcliffe's lead race engineer for the 2018 season, becoming the first female lead race engineer in Indycar. Wickens then suffered a horrific crash during the 2018 ABC Supply 500 at Pocono Raceway, a crash that left him a paraplegic. Wickens issued a further statement clarifying that he was hopeful to be able to walk again, due to his spinal cord being bruised rather than completely severed and that he had felt 'some feeling and movement' back in his legs although the nerves were not in a state to walk, with Wickens hoping that he will be able to walk on his own within two years of the accident.

In 2019, Arrow became title sponsor of SPM, with the team name changing to Arrow Schmidt Peterson Motorsports. In addition, the team also signed former Sauber Formula One driver Marcus Ericsson to become one of the team's drivers for the 2019 season. He drove the No. 7 as the No. 6 is reserved for Wickens should he be able to make a return in 2019.

=== McLaren partnership and ownership (2020–) ===
In August 2019, SPM entered into a collaboration with McLaren for the 2020 season onwards, with the team named Arrow McLaren SP.

Ericsson would leave the team at the end of the season for Chip Ganassi Racing and Hinchcliffe would be dropped; Pato O'Ward and Oliver Askew drove for the team in 2020. During the COVID-19 pandemic that disrupted the season, the team was revealed to have received a loan from the Paycheck Protection Program along with numerous other race teams and race tracks to keep employees on the payroll and protect from any potential loss of sponsors. Askew was let go by the team after the season and was replaced by Felix Rosenqvist.

In 2021, Arrow McLaren SP became the first Chevrolet powered team other than Team Penske to win an IndyCar race since 2016, when Pato O'Ward took his first IndyCar series victory at Texas Motor Speedway. This was also Schmidt Peterson's first victory since 2018 and McLaren's first open wheel racing victory since 2012. O'Ward would take a second victory on the season at Race 2 in Detroit, the first time the team had two wins in a season since 2014 and their first road or street course win since 2017. For the 105th Indianapolis 500 the team would expand to three cars, with Juan Pablo Montoya driving the third car. Oliver Askew returned to the team briefly for Race 2 in Detroit after Rosenqvist was injured in a crash the previous day while former McLaren F1 driver Kevin Magnussen would fill in for Rosenqvist at Road America. On August 8, 2021, McLaren announced they had purchased a 75% ownership stake in the team, with Schmidt and Peterson sharing a 25% stake in the team and remaining on the team's board of governors. Lead sponsor Arrow Electronics also signed an extension with the team that would have them as the primary sponsor through the 2029 season.

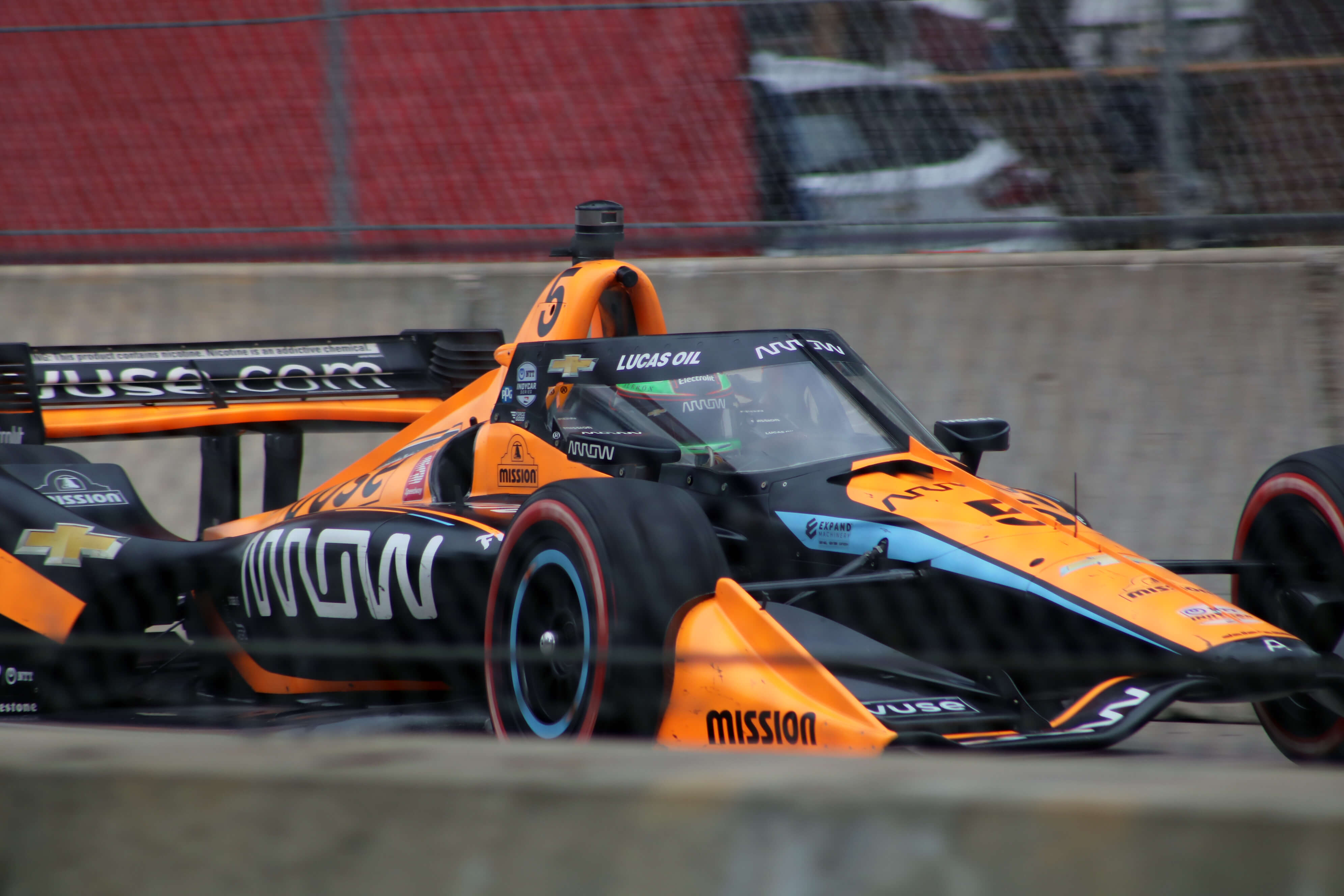
Pato O'Ward in the #5 Arrow-McLaren Dallara during the 2022 Chevy Detroit Grand Prix.

For the 2022 IndyCar Series, the team's first under McLaren ownership, both O'Ward and Rosenqvist would return to the team as full time entries. The No. 6 car would again return on a part-time basis for the GMR Grand Prix and the 2022 Indianapolis 500 driven by Juan Pablo Montoya. O'Ward and Rosenqvist would finish second and fourth in the Indianapolis 500 respectively, the team's best finish at Indianapolis to date. The team announced they had signed Alexander Rossi to drive a third full time car from 2023 and beyond.

For 2023, the team announced they had signed Alexander Rossi to drive a third full time car. Additionally, team president Taylor Kiel left the team. His duties were parsed and redistributed between Brian Barnhart, who joins the team with Rossi from Andretti Autosport as General Manager, and Gavin Ward. In conjunction with McLaren's 60th anniversary celebration, the team raced a special livery for the 2023 Indianapolis 500 to celebrate McLaren's Triple Crown achievement. The liveries of the Nos. 7, 6 and 5 were painted as the McLaren M16C/D that won the 1974 Indianapolis 500, the McLaren MP4/2 that won the 1984 Monaco Grand Prix, and the McLaren F1 GTR that won the 1995 24 Hours of Le Mans respectively to honor the three winning McLaren cars that forms the Triple Crown. In October 2023, McLaren entered into a strategic alliance with Juncos Hollinger Racing.

For 2024, Rosenqvist moved to Meyer Shank Racing and was replaced by David Malukas who moved from Dale Coyne Racing. Malukas was released by the team after breaking his wrist in a pre-season accident and missing four races without a recovery timeline. Callum Ilott and Theo Pourchaire would sub for Malukas before his release, with McLaren later signing Pourchaire for the remainder of the season, bar the Indy 500. The team would sever its ties with Juncos Hollinger Racing following a social media controversy that involved Juncos Hollinger driver Agustin Canapino sending death threats to Pourchaire following the 2024 Chevrolet Detroit Grand Prix. Pourchaire was soon dropped by the team, who signed Nolan Siegel in his place.

On July 6, 2026, Arrow McLaren announced that they had signed six-time IndyCar Champion Scott Dixon and brought back 2026 Indianapolis 500 winner Felix Rosenqvist

== Indy Lights ==
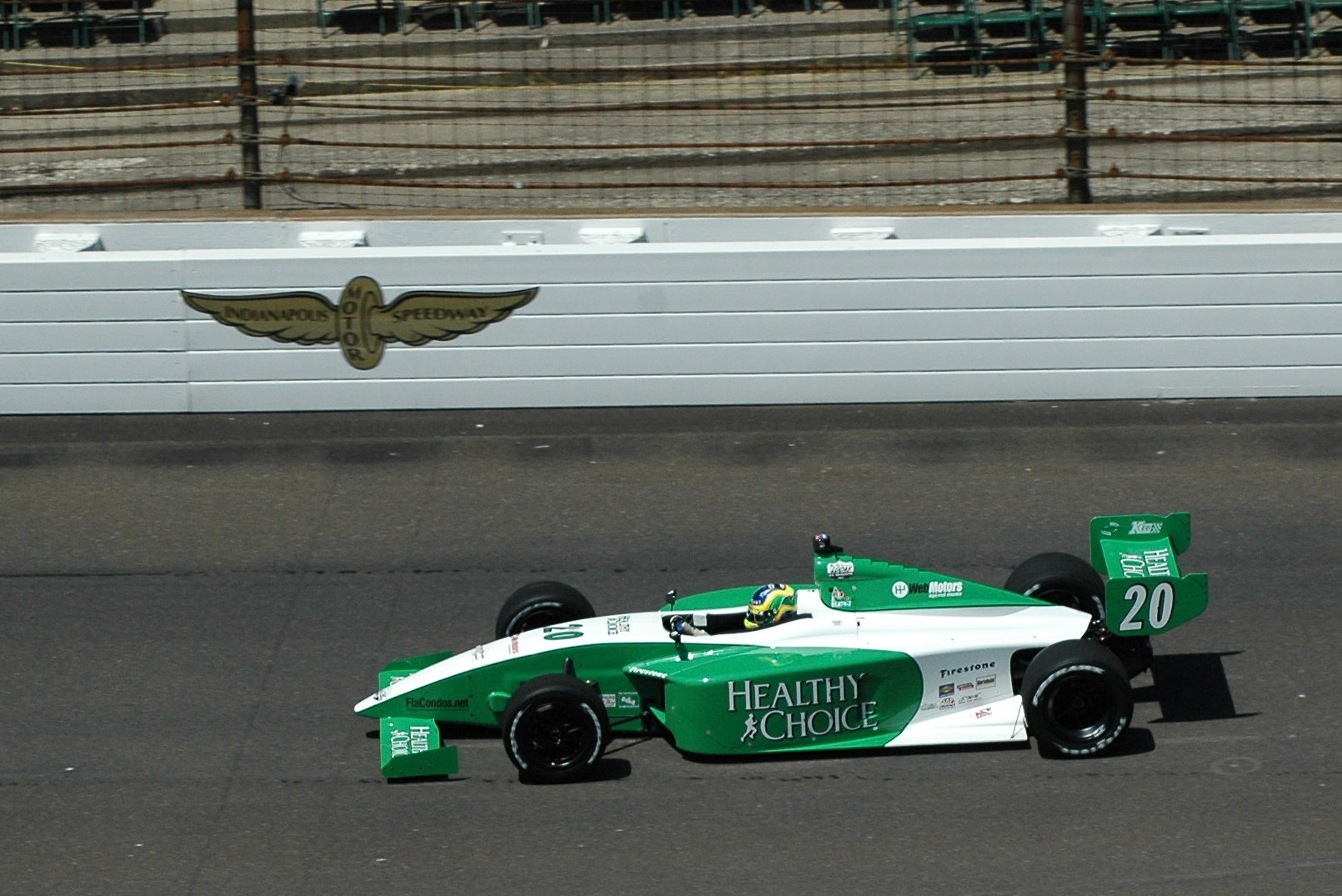
Ana Beatriz during 2008 Freedom 100

Schmidt's Indy Pro Series – later Indy Lights – program has been one of the most successful in the series' recent history, winning the 2004 championship with Thiago Medeiros, the 2006 title with Jay Howard, and the 2007 title with Alex Lloyd. After two less successful seasons, it captured its third championship in 2010 with Jean-Karl Vernay. Once again on top, the team took home a 2012 Lights championship title with Tristan Vautier. For 2013 the team's Indy Lights drivers were Jack Hawksworth, Gabby Chaves, and Sage Karam. Karam won the championship in 2013, becoming the eighth rookie to become series champion.

Schmidt fielded four drivers in 2014. Jack Harvey was runner-up with four wins and ten podiums in fourteen races. Luiz Razia ended fifth with one win and five podiums. Juan Pablo García finished sixth and Juan Piedrahita was seventh, both with no podiums. In 2015, Harvey was runner-up again with two wins and eight podiums in sixteen races. RC Enerson finished fourth with one win and five podiums. Scott Anderson and Ethan Ringel ended ninth and eleventh respectively with one podium each.

For 2016, Schmidt would field cars for Santiago Urrutia and André Negrão. While Urrutia would win the most races of any driver, he would lose the Lights title to Ed Jones of Carlin. In late 2016, Schmidt announced that he would end his Indy Lights program, wanting to divert resources to the team's IndyCar program.

In April 2017, Schmidt Peterson announced a driver development program partnership with the Indy Lights team Belardi Auto Racing. As part of the deal, Schmidt Peterson sponsor Arrow Electronics will also sponsor Belardi driver Santiago Urrutia.

== Racing results ==
=== IndyCar Series ===
(key)

Year	Chassis	Engine	Drivers	No.	1	2	3	4	5	6	7	8	9	10	11	12	13	14	15	16	17	18	19	Pos	Pts
Sam Schmidt Motorsports
2001					PHX	HMS	ATL	INDY	TXS	PPIR	RIR	KAN	NSH	KTY	GAT	CHI	TXS								
2001	Dallara IR-01	Oldsmobile Aurora V8	(United States) Davey Hamilton	99	12	19	18	23	24															26th	54
2001	Dallara IR-01	Oldsmobile Aurora V8	(United States) Richie Hearn	99						9						6								27th	50
2001	Dallara IR-01	Oldsmobile Aurora V8	(United States) Jaques Lazier	99							19	18	3	12										17th	195
2001	Dallara IR-01	Oldsmobile Aurora V8	(United States) Alex Barron	99											21									44th	9
2001	Dallara IR-01	Oldsmobile Aurora V8	(United States) Anthony Lazzaro	44											18		13							38th	29
2002					HMS	PHX	FON	NAZ	INDY	TXS	PPIR	RIR	KAN	NSH	MCH	KTY	GAT	CHI	TXS						
2002	Dallara IR-02	Chevrolet Indy V8	(United States) Mark Dismore	99					32															29th	73
2002	Dallara IR-02	Chevrolet Indy V8	(United States) Jimmy Kite	99					DNQ															NC	—
2002	Dallara IR-02	Chevrolet Indy V8	(United States) Anthony Lazzaro	99	9	17		9	DNQ															30th	70
2002	Dallara IR-02	Chevrolet Indy V8	(United States) Anthony Lazzaro	55							22													30th	70
2002	Dallara IR-02	Chevrolet Indy V8	(United States) Anthony Lazzaro	20													DNS							30th	70
2002	Dallara IR-02	Chevrolet Indy V8	(United States) Greg Ray	20														17	14					23rd	128
2002	Dallara IR-02	Chevrolet Indy V8	(United States) Richie Hearn	20					6		12	7	10	4	10	24								15th	204
2002	Dallara IR-02	Chevrolet Indy V8	(United States) Richie Hearn	99			14			9														15th	204
2003					HMS	PHX	MOT	INDY	TXS	PPIR	RIR	KAN	NSH	MCH	GAT	KTY	NAZ	CHI	FON	TXS					
2003	G-Force GF09	Toyota Indy V8	(United States) Richie Hearn	99				28																28th	39
2004					HMS	PHX	MOT	INDY	TXS	RIR	KAN	NSH	MIL	MCH	KTY	PPIR	NAZ	CHI	FON	TXS					
2004	G-Force GF09B	Toyota Indy V8	(United States) Richie Hearn	33				20																30th	12
2005					HMS	PHX	STP	MOT	INDY	TXS	RIR	KAN	NSH	MIL	MCH	KTY	PPIR	SNM	CHI	WGL	FON				
2005	Panoz GF09C	Chevrolet Indy V8	(United States) Richie Hearn	70					25															33rd	10
2006					HMS	STP	MOT	INDY	WGL	TXS	RIR	KAN	NSH	MIL	MCH	KTY	SNM	CHI							
2006	Dallara IR-05	Honda HI6R V8	(Brazil) Airton Daré	88				18																31st	12
2007					HMS	STP	MOT	KAN	INDY	MIL	TXS	IOW	RIR	WGL	NSH	MOH	MCH	KTY	SNM	DET	CHI				
2007	Dallara IR-05	Honda HI7R V8	(United States) Buddy Lazier	99					19															29th	12
2009					STP	LBH	KAN	INDY	MIL	TXS	IOW	RIR	WGL	TOR	EDM	KTY	MOH	SNM	CHI	MOT	HMS				
2009	Dallara IR-05	Honda HI9R V8	(United Kingdom) Alex Lloyd^{1}	99				13																30th	41
2010					SAO	STP	ALA	LBH	KAN	INDY	TXS	IOW	WGL	TOR	EDM	MOH	SNM	CHI	KTY	MOT	HMS				
2010	Dallara IR-05	Honda HI10R V8	(United States) Townsend Bell^{1}	99						16														38th	18
2011					STP	ALA	LBH	SAO	INDY	TXS		MIL	IOW	TOR	EDM	MOH	NHM	SNM	BAL	MOT	KTY	LSV			
2011	Dallara IR-05	Honda HI11R V8	(Canada) Alex Tagliani	77	6	15	5	19	28	4	14	18	16	23	17	6	19	20	7	4				15th	296
2011	Dallara IR-05	Honda HI11R V8	(United Kingdom) Dan Wheldon^{2}	77																	14	C^{†}		28th	75
2011	Dallara IR-05	Honda HI11R V8	(United Kingdom) Jay Howard^{4}	88					30	15	20													40th	27
2011	Dallara IR-05	Honda HI11R V8	(United States) Townsend Bell	99					26															35th	40
2011	Dallara IR-05	Honda HI11R V8	(New Zealand) Wade Cunningham^{5}	99						29	26													37th	36
2011	Dallara IR-05	Honda HI11R V8	(New Zealand) Wade Cunningham^{5}	17																	7	C^{6}		37th	36
2011	Dallara IR-05	Honda HI11R V8	(United Kingdom) Martin Plowman^{7}	17												18		12	11					33rd	49
2011	Dallara IR-05	Honda HI11R V8	(Japan) Hideki Mutoh^{5}	17																18				43rd	12
Schmidt-Hamilton Motorsports
2012					STP	ALA	LBH	SAO	INDY	DET	TXS	MIL	IOW	TOR	EDM	MOH	SNM	BAL	FON						
2012	Dallara DW12	Honda HI12TT V6 t	(France) Simon Pagenaud	77	6	5	2	12	16	3	6	12	5	12	20	3	7	3	15					5th	387
2012	Dallara DW12	Honda HI12TT V6 t	(United States) Townsend Bell	99					9															30th	26
Schmidt Peterson Hamilton HP Motorsports
2013					STP	ALA	LBH	SAO	INDY	DET		TXS	MIL	IOW	POC	TOR		MOH	SNM	BAL	HOU		FON		
2013	Dallara DW12	Honda HI13TT V6 t	(France) Tristan Vautier	55	21	10	17	16	16	11	14	18	21	13	19	19	16	21	12	11	22	11	21	20th	266
2013	Dallara DW12	Honda HI13TT V6 t	(France) Simon Pagenaud	77	24	6	8	9	8	12	1	13	12	6	6	9	12	2	5	1	4	6	13	3rd	508
2013	Dallara DW12	Honda HI13TT V6 t	(United Kingdom) Katherine Legge^{8}	81					26															37th	8
Schmidt Peterson Motorsports
2014					STP	LBH	ALA	IMS	INDY	DET		TXS	HOU		POC	IOW	TOR		MOH	MIL	SNM	FON			
2014	Dallara DW12	Honda HI14TT V6 t	(Canada) Jacques Villeneuve^{8}	5					14															30th	29
2014	Dallara DW12	Honda HI14TT V6 t	(Russia) Mikhail Aleshin^{9}	7	12	6	22	25	21	17	7	9	23	2	7	21	11	23	14	8	7	DNS		16th	372
2014	Dallara DW12	Honda HI14TT V6 t	(France) Simon Pagenaud	77	5	5	4	1	12	22	6	4	16	1*	6	11	4	22	9	7	3	20		5th	565
2015					STP	NOL	LBH	ALA	IMS	INDY	DET		TXS	TOR	FON	MIL	IOW	MOH	POC	SNM					
2015	Dallara DW12	Honda HI15TT V6 t	(Canada) James Hinchcliffe	5	16	1	12	7	12	Wth														23rd	129
2015	Dallara DW12	Honda HI15TT V6 t	(Australia) Ryan Briscoe	5						12			8		15	21	8	18	8	5				18th	205
2015	Dallara DW12	Honda HI15TT V6 t	(United States) Conor Daly	5							19	6		12										28th	81
2015	Dallara DW12	Honda HI15TT V6 t	(United States) Conor Daly	43						33														28th	81
2015	Dallara DW12	Honda HI15TT V6 t	(United Kingdom) James Jakes	7	22	3	19	22	18	18	12	15	9	21	7	23	15	16	10	25				16th	257
2015	Dallara DW12	Honda HI15TT V6 t	(Russia) Mikhail Aleshin^{9}	77																10				33rd	40
2016					STP	PHX	LBH	ALA	IMS	INDY	DET		ROA	IOW	TOR	MOH	POC	TXS	WGL	SNM					
2016	Dallara DW12	Honda HI16TT V6 t	(Canada) James Hinchcliffe	5	19	18	8	6	3	7	18	21	14	9	3	5	10	2*	18	12				13th	416
2016	Dallara DW12	Honda HI16TT V6 t	(Russia) Mikhail Aleshin^{9}	7	5	17	16	17	13	27	15	17	16	5	6	17*	2*	16	22	11				15th	347
2016	Dallara DW12	Honda HI16TT V6 t	(Spain) Oriol Servià	77						12														24th	72
2017					STP	LBH	ALA	PHX	IMS	INDY	DET		TXS	ROA	IOW	TOR	MOH	POC	GAT	WGL	SNM				
2017	Dallara DW12	Honda HI17TT V6 t	(Canada) James Hinchcliffe	5	9	1	7	12	13	22	3	20	14	20	10	3	11	20	8	21	22			13th	376
2017	Dallara DW12	Honda HI17TT V6 t	(Russia) Mikhail Aleshin^{9}	7	14	12	10	17	18	13	6	16	15	10	21		14							19th	237
2017	Dallara DW12	Honda HI17TT V6 t	(Colombia) Sebastián Saavedra^{5}	7												11		21	11					26th	80
2017	Dallara DW12	Honda HI17TT V6 t	(United Kingdom) Jack Harvey	7																14	18			28th	57
2017	Dallara DW12	Honda HI17TT V6 t	(United Kingdom) Jay Howard	77						33														32nd	24
2018					STP	PHX	LBH	ALA	IMS	INDY	DET		TXS	ROA	IOW	TOR	MOH	POC	GAT	POR	SNM				
2018	Dallara DW12	Honda HI18TT V6 t	(Canada) James Hinchcliffe	5	4	6	9	3	7	DNQ	11	16	4	10	1	4	14	20	15	22	15			10th	391
2018	Dallara DW12	Honda HI18TT V6 t	(Canada) Robert Wickens	6	18*	2	22	4	3	9	8	6	19	5	5	3	2	19						11th	391
2018	Dallara DW12	Honda HI18TT V6 t	(Colombia) Carlos Muñoz	6																12	18			25th	95
2018	Dallara DW12	Honda HI18TT V6 t	(United Kingdom) Jay Howard^{5}	7						24														39th	12
2018	Dallara DW12	Honda HI18TT V6 t	(United Kingdom) Jack Harvey^{10}	60	23		12			16							20			16	17			24th	103
Arrow Schmidt Peterson Motorsports
2019					STP	COA	ALA	LBH	IMS	INDY	DET		TXS	ROA	TOR	IOW	MOH	POC	GAT	POR	LAG				
2019	Dallara DW12	Honda HI19TT V6 t	(Canada) James Hinchcliffe	5	6	16	6	9	16	11	9	18	19	7	6	3	22	20	12	20	9			12th	370
2019	Dallara DW12	Honda HI19TT V6 t	(Sweden) Marcus Ericsson	7	20	15	7	20	24	23	13	2	7	13	20	11	23	12	16		11			17th	290
2019	Dallara DW12	Honda HI19TT V6 t	(United States) Conor Daly	7																21				24th	149
2019	Dallara DW12	Honda HI19TT V6 t	(United Kingdom) Jack Harvey^{10}	60	10	10	13	22	3	21				15			10			19	19			21st	186
2019	Dallara DW12	Honda HI19TT V6 t	(Spain) Oriol Servià^{11}	77						22														34th	16
Arrow McLaren SP
2020					TXS	IMS	ROA		IOW		INDY	GAT		MOH		IMS		STP							
2020	Dallara DW12	Chevrolet IndyCar V6 t	(Mexico) Patricio O'Ward	5	12	8	8	2*	4	12	6	3*	2	11	9	22	5	2						4th	416
2020	Dallara DW12	Chevrolet IndyCar V6 t	(United States) Oliver Askew R	7	9	26	15	21	3	6	30	14	17	19	15			16						19th	195
2020	Dallara DW12	Chevrolet IndyCar V6 t	(Brazil) Hélio Castroneves	7												20	21							27th	57
2020	Dallara DW12	Chevrolet IndyCar V6 t	(Spain) Fernando Alonso	66							21													31st	18
2021					ALA	STP	TXS		IMS	INDY	DET		ROA	MOH	NSH	IMS	GAT	POR	LAG	LBH					
2021	Dallara DW12	Chevrolet IndyCar V6 t	(Mexico) Patricio O'Ward	5	4	19	3	1	15	4	3	1	9	8	13	5	2	14	5	27				3rd	487
2021	Dallara DW12	Chevrolet IndyCar V6 t	(Sweden) Felix Rosenqvist	7	21	12	13	16	17	27	25			23	8	13	16	6	19	13				21st	205
2021	Dallara DW12	Chevrolet IndyCar V6 t	(United States) Oliver Askew	7								25												29th	61
2021	Dallara DW12	Chevrolet IndyCar V6 t	(Denmark) Kevin Magnussen R	7									24											42nd	7
2021	Dallara DW12	Chevrolet IndyCar V6 t	(Colombia) Juan Pablo Montoya	86					21	9														31st	53
2022					STP	TXS	LBH	ALA	IMS	INDY	DET	ROA	MOH	TOR	IOW		IMS	NSH	GAT	POR	LAG				
2022	Dallara DW12	Chevrolet IndyCar V6t	(Mexico) Patricio O'Ward	5	12	15	5	1	19	2	5	26	24	11	2	1	12	24	4	4	8			7th	480
2022	Dallara DW12	Chevrolet IndyCar V6t	(Colombia) Juan Pablo Montoya	6					24	11														31st	44
2022	Dallara DW12	Chevrolet IndyCar V6t	(Sweden) Felix Rosenqvist	7	17	21	11	16	6	4	10	6	27	3	26	7	9	7	16	10	4			8th	393
Arrow McLaren
2023					STP	TXS	LBH	ALA	IMS	INDY	DET	ROA	MOH	TOR	IOW		NSH	IMS	GAT	POR	LAG				
2023	Dallara DW12	Chevrolet IndyCar V6t	(Mexico) Pato O'Ward	5	2	2	17	4	2	24*	26	3	8	8	3	10	8	3	2	4	9			4th	484
2023	Dallara DW12	Chevrolet IndyCar V6t	(Sweden) Felix Rosenqvist	6	19	26	7	9	5	27	3	20	25	10	13	4	22	27	8	2	19			12th	324
2023	Dallara DW12	Chevrolet IndyCar V6t	(United States) Alexander Rossi	7	4	22	22	8	3	5	5	10	10	16	10	15	19	5	4	20	7			9th	375
2023	Dallara DW12	Chevrolet IndyCar V6t	(Brazil) Tony Kanaan	66						16														32nd	18
2024					STP	THE^{15}	LBH	ALA	IMS	INDY	DET	ROA	LAG	MOH	IOW		TOR	GAT	POR	MIL		NSH			
2024	Dallara DW12	Chevrolet IndyCar V6t	(Mexico) Pato O'Ward	5	1	DNQ	16	23	13	2	7	8	8	1	2	6	17	26	15	1*	24	2		5th	460
2024	Dallara DW12	Chevrolet IndyCar V6t	(United Kingdom) Callum Ilott	6	11	DNQ				11														33rd	39
2024	Dallara DW12	Chevrolet IndyCar V6t	(United States) Nolan Siegel R	6									12	20	12	14	18	7	21	17	25	18		23rd	154
2024	Dallara DW12	Chevrolet IndyCar V6t	(France) Théo Pourchaire R	6			11	22	19		10	13												28th	91
2024	Dallara DW12	Chevrolet IndyCar V6t	(France) Théo Pourchaire R	7													14							28th	91
2024	Dallara DW12	Chevrolet IndyCar V6t	(United States) Alexander Rossi	7	6	7	10	25	8	4	5	18	3	6	8	15	Wth	19	12	7	6	15		10th	366
2024	Dallara DW12	Chevrolet IndyCar V6t	(United States) Kyle Larson^{13} R	17						18														36th	21
2025					STP	THE	LBH	ALA	IMS	INDY	DET	GAT	ROA	MOH	IOW		TOR	LAG	POR	MIL	NSH				
2025	Dallara DW12	Chevrolet IndyCar V6t	(Mexico) Pato O'Ward	5	11	2*	13	6	2	3	7	2	17	5	1	5	1	4	25	5	24*			2nd	515
2025	Dallara DW12	Chevrolet IndyCar V6t	(United States) Nolan Siegel	6	25	19	20	9	13	13	19	19	8	11	24	DNS	18	18	16	27	17			22nd	213
2025	Dallara DW12	Chevrolet IndyCar V6t	(Denmark) Christian Lundgaard	7	8	3	3	2	16	7	8	14	24	3	21	6	13	2	2	6	25			5th	431
2025	Dallara DW12	Chevrolet IndyCar V6t	(United States) Kyle Larson^{13} R	17					24															24th	6
2026					STP	PHX	ARL	ALA	LBH	IMS	INDY	DET	GAT	ROA	MOH	NSH	POR	MAR	D.C.	MIL		LAG			
2026	Dallara DW12	Chevrolet IndyCar V6t	(Mexico) Pato O'Ward	5	5	4	5	17	5	18	4	4	11	12	1	7	11	5	16	1	1	11		4th	522
2026	Dallara DW12	Chevrolet IndyCar V6t	(United States) Nolan Siegel	6	20	20	24	18	12	10	11	15	24	21	10	11	18	12	6	13	17	24		20th	259
2026	Dallara DW12	Chevrolet IndyCar V6t	(Denmark) Christian Lundgaard	7	3	13	7	2	20	1	17	5	10	1	2	16	9	6	2	3	6^{L}	6		3rd	535
2026	Dallara DW12	Chevrolet IndyCar V6t	(United States) Ryan Hunter-Reay^{14}	31							32													32nd	5

R Eligible for Rookie of the Year

* Season still in progress

1. In conjunction with Chip Ganassi Racing.
2. In conjunction with Bryan Herta Autosport.
3. Dan Wheldon was killed during the running of the 2011 IZOD IndyCar World Championship.
4. In conjunction with Rahal Letterman Lanigan Racing.
5. In conjunction with AFS Racing.
6. The final race at Las Vegas was canceled due to Dan Wheldon's death.
7. In conjunction with AFS Racing and Kingdom Racing.
8. In conjunction with Team Pelfrey.
9. In conjunction with SMP Racing.
10. In conjunction with Meyer Shank Racing
11. In conjunction with MotoGator Team Stange Racing
12. In conjunction with McLaren Racing
13. In conjunction with Hendrick Motorsports
14. In conjunction with Legacy Motor Club
15. Non-points-paying, exhibition race

==== IndyCar Series wins ====
#	Season	Date	Sanction	Track / Race	No.	Winning driver	Chassis	Engine	Tire	Grid	Laps Led
1	2013	June 2	IndyCar	R Detroit Belle Isle Grand Prix	77	(France) Simon Pagenaud	Dallara DW12	Honda HI13TT V6 t	Firestone	6	18
2	2013	September 1	IndyCar	R Grand Prix of Baltimore	77	(France) Simon Pagenaud (2)	Dallara DW12	Honda HI13TT V6 t	Firestone	3	7
3	2014	May 10	IndyCar	R Grand Prix of Indianapolis	77	(France) Simon Pagenaud (3)	Dallara DW12	Honda HI14TT V6 t	Firestone	4	6
4	2014	June 29	IndyCar	R Grand Prix of Houston	77	(France) Simon Pagenaud (4)	Dallara DW12	Honda HI14TT V6 t	Firestone	3	43
5	2015	April 12	IndyCar	R Indy Grand Prix of Louisiana	5	(Canada) James Hinchcliffe	Dallara DW12	Honda HI15TT V6 t	Firestone	16	15
6	2017	April 9	IndyCar	R Toyota Grand Prix of Long Beach	5	(Canada) James Hinchcliffe (2)	Dallara DW12	Honda HI17TT V6 t	Firestone	4	25
7	2018	July 8	IndyCar	O Iowa Speedway	5	(Canada) James Hinchcliffe (3)	Dallara DW12	Honda HI18TT V6 t	Firestone	11	45
8	2021	May 2	IndyCar	O Texas Motor Speedway	5	(Mexico) Pato O'Ward	Dallara DW12	Chevrolet IndyCar V6 t	Firestone	4	25
9	2021	June 13	IndyCar	R Detroit Grand Prix	5	(Mexico) Pato O'Ward (2)	Dallara DW12	Chevrolet IndyCar V6 t	Firestone	16	3
10	2022	May 1	IndyCar	R Honda Indy Grand Prix of Alabama	5	(Mexico) Pato O'Ward (3)	Dallara DW12	Chevrolet IndyCar V6 t	Firestone	2	27
11	2022	July 24	IndyCar	O Iowa Speedway	5	(Mexico) Pato O'Ward (4)	Dallara DW12	Chevrolet IndyCar V6 t	Firestone	7	66
12	2024	March 10	IndyCar	R Grand Prix of St. Petersburg	5	(Mexico) Pato O'Ward (5)	Dallara DW12	Chevrolet IndyCar V6 t	Firestone	3	0 (Note: O'Ward was awarded the win after another driver was disqualified)
13	2024	July 7	IndyCar	R Mid-Ohio Sports Car Course	5	(Mexico) Pato O'Ward (6)	Dallara DW12	Chevrolet IndyCar V6 t	Firestone	2	24
14	2024	August 31	IndyCar	O Milwaukee Mile Race 1	5	(Mexico) Pato O'Ward (7)	Dallara DW12	Chevrolet IndyCar V6 t	Firestone	6	133
15	2025	July 12	IndyCar	O Iowa Speedway Race 1	5	(Mexico) Pato O'Ward (8)	Dallara DW12	Chevrolet IndyCar V6 t	Firestone	5	33
16	2025	July 20	IndyCar	R Exhibition Place	5	(Mexico) Pato O'Ward (9)	Dallara DW12	Chevrolet IndyCar V6 t	Firestone	10	30
17	2026	May 9	IndyCar	R Grand Prix of Indianapolis	7	(Denmark) Christian Lundgaard	Dallara DW12	Chevrolet IndyCar V6 t	Firestone	4	20
18	2026	June 21	IndyCar	R XPEL Grand Prix at Road America	7	(Denmark) Christian Lundgaard (2)	Dallara DW12	Chevrolet IndyCar V6 t	Firestone	12	7
19	2026	July 5	IndyCar	R Mid-Ohio Sports Car Course	5	(Mexico) Pato O'Ward (10)	Dallara DW12	Chevrolet IndyCar V6 t	Firestone	2	45
20	2026	August 30	IndyCar	O Milwaukee Mile Race 2	5	(Mexico) Pato O'Ward (11)	Dallara DW12	Chevrolet IndyCar V6 t	Firestone	2	55
21	2026	August 30	IndyCar	O Milwaukee Mile Race 1	5	(Mexico) Pato O'Ward (12)	Dallara DW12	Chevrolet IndyCar V6 t	Firestone	Pole	119

O Short oval/Superspeedway
R Road/street course

=== Complete Indy Lights results ===
(key)

Indy Lights results
Year	Chassis	Engine	Drivers	No.	1	2	3	4	5	6	7	8	9	10	11	12	13	14	15	16	17	18	Points		Position	
2002					KAN	NSH	MCH	KTY	GAT	CHI	TXS												D.C.	T.C.	D.C.	T.C.
2002	Dallara	Infiniti	(United States) Jeff Tillman	9			12																18	—	20th	—
2002	Dallara	Infiniti	(Canada) Tom Wood	9				10		3	6												83	—	15th	—
2002	Dallara	Infiniti	(United States) Curtis Francois	9					5														30	—	18th	—
2002	Dallara	Infiniti	(United States) G.J. Mennen	99	8	8	9	15	4	9	9												161	—	8th	—
2003					HMS	PHX	INDY	PPIR	KAN	NSH	MCH	GAT	KTY	CHI	FON	TXS							D.C.	T.C.	D.C.	T.C.
2003	Dallara	Infiniti	(United States) Lloyd Mack	6	DNS																		14	—	29th	—
2003	Dallara	Infiniti	(United States) Ross Fonferko	6						3	13												52	—	18th	—
2003	Dallara	Infiniti	(Italy) Marco Cioci	6			9																40	—	21st	—
2003	Dallara	Infiniti	(Italy) Marco Cioci	99										12									40	—	21st	—
2003	Dallara	Infiniti	(United States) Brandon Erwin	99	3	4	11	11	6	10	12	10	9										213	—	11th	—
2003	Dallara	Infiniti	(United States) Brad Pollard	99											11	15							34	—	23rd	—
2003	Dallara	Infiniti	(Canada) Tom Wood	9	6	15	13	10	3	2	5	5	10										235	—	8th	—
2003	Dallara	Infiniti	(United States) Taylor Fletcher	9										14	12	17							47	—	20th	—
2004					HMS	PHX	INDY	KAN	NSH	MIL	MCH	KTY	PPIR	CHI	FON	TXS							D.C.	T.C.	D.C.	T.C.
2004	Dallara	Infiniti	(Netherlands) Arie Luyendyk Jr.	5	9	2	3	7	11	9	8												330	—	3rd	—
2004	Dallara	Infiniti	(United States) Travis Gregg	5								5		13		2							89	—	15th	—
2004	Dallara	Infiniti	(Japan) Shinji Kajima	5											13								17	—	26th	—
2004	Dallara	Infiniti	(Brazil) Thiago Medeiros	11	2*	1*	1*	1*	1*	6*	2*	6	3	1*	9*	1*							513	—	1st	—
2004	Dallara	Infiniti	(United States) Brad Pollard	64				5	8	5													152	—	11th	—
2004	Dallara	Infiniti	(United States) Scott Mayer	64										12		10							38	—	22nd	—
2004	Dallara	Infiniti	(United States) P.J. Abbott	64											7								48	—	20th	—
2005					HMS	PHX	STP	INDY	TEX	IMS	NSH	MIL	KTY	PPIR	SNM	CHI	WGL	FON					D.C.	T.C.	D.C.	T.C.
2005	Dallara	Infiniti	(Brazil) Jaime Camara	1	2	11	13	1*	9	5	1*	5	8	9	12	6	7	10					403	—	5th	—
2005	Dallara	Infiniti	(United States) Travis Gregg	7	1*	6	6	6	1*	7	10	8	1*	3	6	5	12	3					462	—	3rd	—
2005	Dallara	Infiniti	(United States) Sarah McCune	8												9							23	—	23rd	—
2005	Dallara	Infiniti	(United States) Scott Mayer	11		7						11			DNS	DNS							80	—	15th	—
2005	Dallara	Infiniti	(Canada) Tom Wood	11				12															68	—	16th	—
2005	Dallara	Infiniti	(United States) P.J. Abbott	11					11									8					43	—	18th	—
2005	Dallara	Infiniti	(United States) Rocco DeSimone	11													13						17	—	27th	—
2005	Dallara	Infiniti	(United States) Chris Festa	19	10	2	8	8	3	3	7	10	9	6	5	11	4	4					387	—	6th	—
2006					HMS	STP		INDY	WGL	IMS	NSH	MIL	KTY	SNM		CHI							D.C.	T.C.	D.C.	T.C.
2006	Dallara	Nissan VRH	(United Kingdom) Jay Howard	7	3	3	2	2	6	18	1	7	1	10	5	3							390	—	1st	—
2006	Dallara	Nissan VRH	(Brazil) Jaime Camara	11	11	12	13	3	4	13	2	1	14	7	14	16							298	—	6th	—
2006	Dallara	Nissan VRH	(United States) Ryan Justice	38										8	8								48	—	26th	—
2006	Dallara	Nissan VRH	(United States) Travis Gregg	77									4										67	—	23rd	—
2006	Dallara	Nissan VRH	(Japan) Akihara Okamoto	77												14							16	—	40th	—
2007					HMS	STP		INDY	MIL	IMS		IOW	WGL		NSH	MOH	KTY	SNM		CHI			D.C.	T.C.	D.C.	T.C.
2007	Dallara	Nissan VRH	(United Kingdom) Alex Lloyd	7	1*	1*	1	1*	1*	2	2	1	3	1*	11*	22	2	1*	DNS	2*			652	—	1st	—
2007	Dallara	Nissan VRH	(United States) Logan Gomez	23	16	14	18	12	18	9	6	6	14	15	2	10	13	6	4	1			368	—	7th	—
2007	Dallara	Nissan VRH	(United States) Ryan Justice	38	25			13	6	8	4	4	23	23	8	11	15	8	2*				276	—	13th	—
2007	Dallara	Nissan VRH	(United States) Travis Gregg	38																16			34	—	32nd	—
2007	Dallara	Nissan VRH	(United States) Leilani Münter	57													16			13			31	—	33rd	—
2008					HMS	STP		KAN	INDY	MIL	IOW	WGL		NSH	MOH		KTY	SNM		CHI			D.C.	T.C.	D.C.	T.C.
2008	Dallara	Nissan VRH	(United States) Richard Antinucci	7	2*	2	1	13	2	16	9	2	1*	12	3	14	4	3	2	21			478	—	2nd	—
2008	Dallara	Nissan VRH	(Australia) James Davison	11	22	13	14	11	17	6	15	DNS	11	16	7	1	2	14	13	5			333	—	9th	—
2008	Dallara	Nissan VRH	(Brazil) Ana Beatriz	20	7	3	16	14	5	19	3	4	3	1*	14	5	16	6	3	2			449	—	3rd	—
2008	Dallara	Nissan VRH	(United States) Jon Brownson	34	23			21	27	DNS													23	—	36th	—
2008	Dallara	Nissan VRH	(United States) Travis Gregg	34							21									24			15	—	38th	—
2008	Dallara	Nissan VRH	(New Zealand) Jonny Reid	77					20	15	19	10	21	17	4	9		9	19	11			186	—	18th	—
2009					STP		LBH	KAN	INDY	MIL	IOW	WGL	TOR	EDM	KTY	MOH	SNM	CHI	HMS				D.C.	T.C.	D.C.	T.C.
2009	Dallara	Nissan VRH	(Canada) James Hinchcliffe	7	6	3	3	12	16	7	3	21	3	4	7	2	6	12	14				395	—	5th	—
2009	Dallara	Nissan VRH	(New Zealand) Wade Cunningham	11	16	11	20	2	1	6	2*	19	7	6	1	14	12	4*	6				416	—	4th	—
2009	Dallara	Nissan VRH	(Brazil) Ana Beatriz	20	4	23	5	4	17		1	9	13	12	3	12	5	14					320	—	8th	—
2009	Dallara	Nissan VRH	(United States) Logan Gomez	20															9				33	—	28th	—
2009	Dallara	Nissan VRH	(Colombia) Gustavo Yacamán	44	12	9	9	17	18	4	5	7	8	16	19	10	19		16				269	—	12th	—
2010					STP	ALA	LBH	INDY	IOW	WGL	TOR	EDM	MOH	SNM	CHI	KTY	HMS						D.C.	T.C.	D.C.	T.C.
2010	Dallara	Nissan VRH	(France) Jean-Karl Vernay	7	1*	1*	3	13	3	1	1*	2	8	1*	4	3	15						494	—	1st	—
2010	Dallara	Nissan VRH	(United Kingdom) Pippa Mann	11	13	12	8	16	8	14	8	11		5	2*	1*	5						313	—	5th	—
2010	Dallara	Nissan VRH	(Canada) Philip Major	49	14	10	7	6	6	6	12	10	10	11	3	13	8						299	—	9th	—
2010	Dallara	Nissan VRH	(United Kingdom) James Winslow	77	7	15	12			5	11	DNP	9										130	—	14	—
2010	Dallara	Nissan VRH	(New Zealand) Wade Cunningham	77				1*									3						87	—	15th	—
2010	Dallara	Nissan VRH	(Canada) Alex Ellis	77										14									16	—	33rd	—
2011					STP	ALA	LBH	INDY	MIL	IOW	TOR	EDM		TRO	NHA	BAL	KTY	LSV					D.C.	T.C.	D.C.	T.C.
2011	Dallara	Nissan VRH	(Brazil) Victor Carbone	3	9	14	6	18	6	7	9	11	4	10	10	3	7	1					357	—	6th	—
2011	Dallara	Nissan VRH	(Argentina) Esteban Guerrieri	7	6	15	2	2	1*	12	4	1*	14	1*	5	12	10	2					459	—	2nd	—
2011	Dallara	Nissan VRH	(United States) Josef Newgarden	11	1*	6	13*	1*	2	1*	8	2	1*	3	1*	2	2	9*					553	—	1st	—
2011	Dallara	Nissan VRH	(United States) Conor Daly	77	2	11	1							13		14*							145	—	13th	—
2011	Dallara	Nissan VRH	(United States) Bryan Clauson	77				5	4	3					7		5	13					170	—	12th	—
2011	Dallara	Nissan VRH	(United States) Daniel Herrington	77							12	9	7										66	—	21st	—
2012					STP	ALA	LBH	INDY	DET	MIL	IOW	TOR	EDM	TRO	BAL	FON							D.C.	T.C.	D.C.	T.C.
2012	Dallara	Nissan VRH	(Brazil) Victor Carbone	3	5	5	4	6*	4	6	3	3	8	8	DNS	5							340	—	6th	—
2012	Dallara	Nissan VRH	(United Kingdom) Oliver Webb	7	4	13	6	15	3*	12	12	5	4	5	6	8							310	—	7th	—
2012	Dallara	Nissan VRH	(Argentina) Esteban Guerrieri	11	2	3	1*	1	7	3	1	6	3	4	3	3							453	—	2nd	—
2012	Dallara	Nissan VRH	(France) Tristan Vautier	77	1*	2	3	3	5	1*	4*	11	6	1*	1*	4							461	—	1st	—
2013					STP	ALA	LBH	INDY	MIL	IOW	POC	TOR	MOH	BAL	HOU	FON							D.C.	T.C.	D.C.	T.C.
2013	Dallara	Nissan VRH	(Colombia) Gabby Chaves	7	8	3	2	2	4	2	3	3	1*	3	2	2							449	—	2nd	—
2013	Dallara	Nissan VRH	(United States) Sage Karam	8	3	4	3	3	1	1*	2	6	8	2	1*	3							460	—	1st	—
2013	Dallara	Nissan VRH	(United States) Kyle O'Gara	67				11								8							43	—	12th	—
2013	Dallara	Nissan VRH	(United Kingdom) Jack Hawksworth	77	1*	2	8	10	8	3	5	1*	3	1*	6	9							412	—	4th	—
2014					STP	LBH	ALA		IMS		INDY	POC	TOR	MOH		MIL	SNM						D.C.	T.C.	D.C.	T.C.
2014	Dallara	Nissan VRH	(Brazil) Luiz Razia	7	5	5	2	4	2	1*	4	8	12	3	11	8	3	4					403	403	5th	1st
2014	Dallara	Nissan VRH	(Mexico) Juan Pablo Garcia	10	7	8	7	6	6	6	6	4	8	10	6	7	4	9					372	403	6th	1st
2014	Dallara	Nissan VRH	(United Kingdom) Jack Harvey	42	3	4	3	5	3	2	5	3	3	1*	1*	5	1*	1*					547	403	2nd	1st
2014	Dallara	Nissan VRH	(Colombia) Juan Piedrahita	77	6	7	10	7	8	11	8	7	7	9	5	6	5	7					337	403	7th	1st
2015					STP		LBH	ALA		IMS		INDY	TOR		MIL	IOW	MOH		LAG				D.C.	T.C.	D.C.	T.C.
2015	Dallara IL-15	Mazda-AER MZR-R 2.0 Turbo I4	(United States) RC Enerson	7	9	13	4	3	7	5	2	4	8	5	2*	3	1*	4	6	6			295	407	4th	1st
2015	Dallara IL-15	Mazda-AER MZR-R 2.0 Turbo I4	(South Korea) Heamin Choi	21															12	11			19	407	16th	1st
2015	Dallara IL-15	Mazda-AER MZR-R 2.0 Turbo I4	(United Kingdom) Jack Harvey	42	2	2	10	2	2	1*	5	1	2	2	4	5	11	10	5	9			330	407	2nd	1st
2015	Dallara IL-15	Mazda-AER MZR-R 2.0 Turbo I4	(United States) Ethan Ringel	71	8	12	7	10	9	10	10	2*	6	11	10	11	12	7	10	12			197	407	11th	1st
2015	Dallara IL-15	Mazda-AER MZR-R 2.0 Turbo I4	(United States) Scott Anderson	77	7	10	6	11	5	6	9	3	9	10	5	6	7	8	9	13			219	407	9th	1st
2016					STP		PHX	ALA		IMS		INDY	ROA		IOW	TOR		MOH		WGL	LAG		D.C.	T.C.	D.C.	T.C.
2016	Dallara IL-15	Mazda-AER MZR-R 2.0 Turbo I4	(United States) RC Enerson	7	5	12	3	6	4	8	15	11											111	384	14th	2nd
2016	Dallara IL-15	Mazda-AER MZR-R 2.0 Turbo I4	(Brazil) André Negrão	17	6	5	6	8	11	9	16	15	10	2	13	11	2	2	3	3	9	6	268	384	7th	2nd
2016	Dallara IL-15	Mazda-AER MZR-R 2.0 Turbo I4	(Uruguay) Santiago Urrutia	55	4	13	4	11	1*	2	2	14	9	1*	5	4	4	1*	1*	12	5	2	361	384	2nd	2nd
2016	Dallara IL-15	Mazda-AER MZR-R 2.0 Turbo I4	(United States) Scott Anderson	77	13	9		10	13	12	8												61	384	17th	2nd
2016	Dallara IL-15	Mazda-AER MZR-R 2.0 Turbo I4	(South Korea) Heamin Choi	77			16					12			10						15	12	40	384	18th	2nd

== See also ==
- Lucas Dumbrell Motorsport – Another motorsport team founded by a quadriplegic ex-racing driver.
- Walkinshaw Andretti United
