= Nick Bussell =

American racing driver

- Nationality: American
- Born: Nicholas Paul Bussell; April 1, 1983 (age 43) Ionia, Michigan, U.S.

Indy Pro Series
- Years active: 2005-2006
- Teams: J. L. West Motorsports; Vision Racing; Cheever Racing
- Starts: 26
- Wins: 0
- Poles: 0
- Best finish: 4th in 2005

Previous series
- 2003: Fran-Am 2000 North America

Nicholas Paul Bussell (born April 1, 1983) is an American racing driver from Ionia, Michigan.

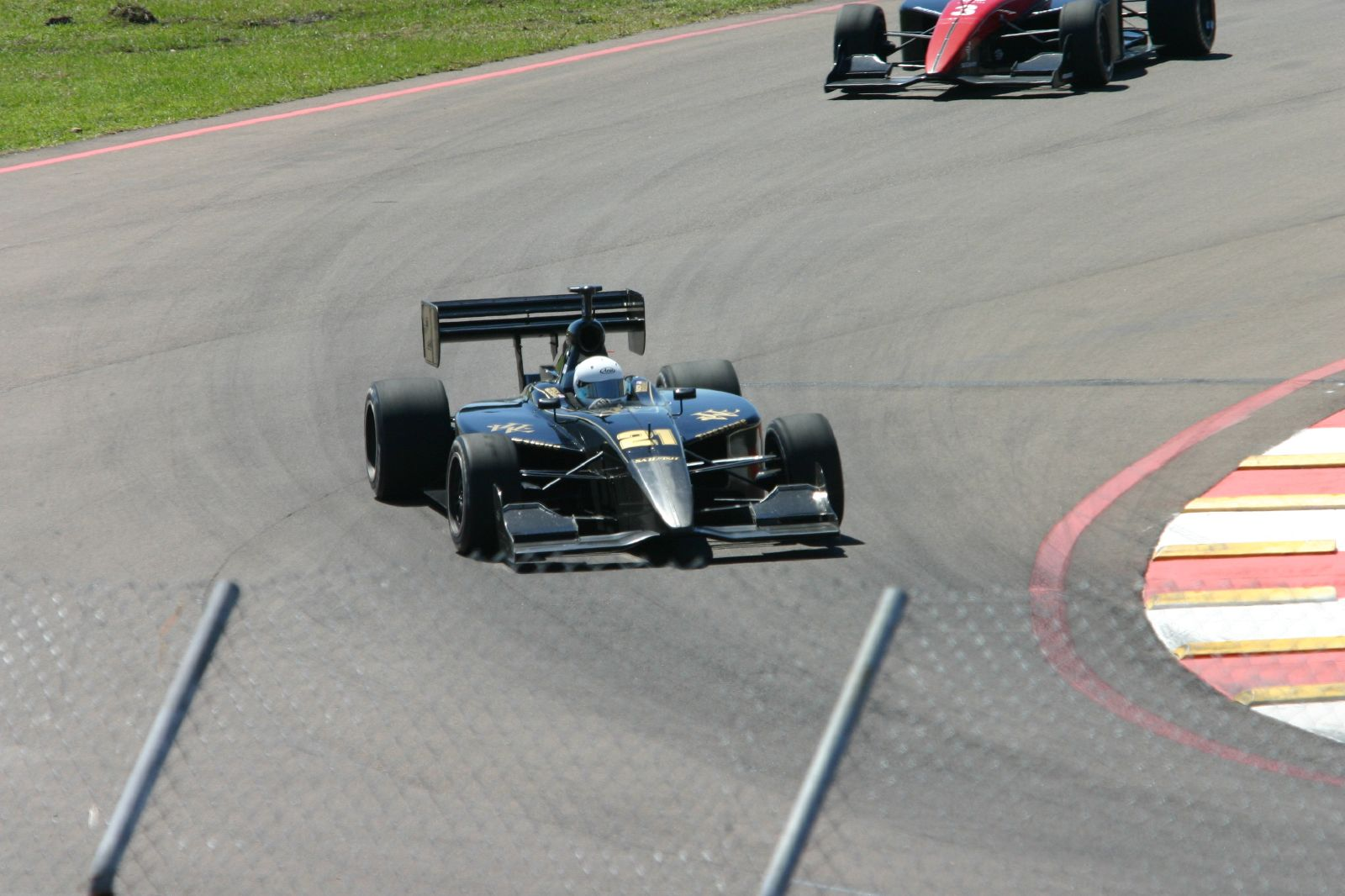
Bussell driving on the Streets of St. Petersburg in 2005

After karting, Bussell joined the Fran-Am 2000 North American Pro Championship series in 2003 where he finished tenth in points. He took most of 2004 off of racing while he worked in race car fabrication in Indianapolis. In 2005 he joined the Indy Pro Series with J. L. West Motorsports but switched teams to Vision Racing after six races. He completed all but two laps all season and finished fourth in points with a best finish of second at Pikes Peak International Raceway. He returned to the series in 2006 to race for Cheever Racing. He finished fifth in points in 2006 with a best finish of second in the season opener at Homestead Miami Speedway. According to his website, he and his manager attempted to find a team to race with in 2007 but were apparently unable to as Bussell has not competed in a professional race since the close of the 2006 Pro Series season.

== Motorsport career ==
=== American open-wheel results ===
(key) (Races in bold indicate pole position) (Races in italics indicate fastest lap)

==== Indy Pro Series ====
Year	Team	1	2	3	4	5	6	7	8	9	10	11	12	13	14	Rank	Points
2005	Vision Racing	HMS; 6	PHX; 5	STP; 3	INDY; 15	TXS; 5	IMS; 4	NSH; 5	MIL; 3	KTY; 6	PPIR; 2	SNM; 4	CHI; 3	WGL; 5	FON; 5	**4th**	**430**
2006	Cheever Racing	HMS; 2	STP1; 4	STP2; 10	INDY; 10	WGL; 15	IMS; 5	NSH; 6	MIL; 5	KTY; 6	SNM1; 3	SNM2; 13	CHI; 8			**5th**	**319**
