= Jaime Camara =

Brazilian race car driver (born 1980)

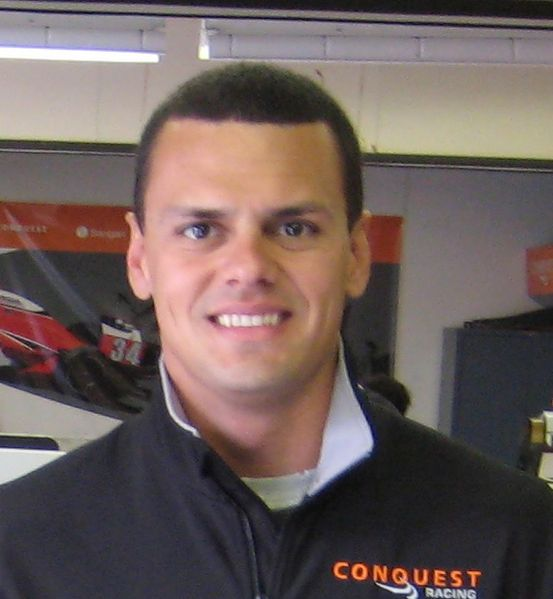
- Jaime Camara at the Indianapolis Motor Speedway in May 2008.
- Nationality: (Brazil) Brazilian
- Born: Jaime Câmara Neto; November 5, 1980 (age 46) Goiânia, Goiás, Brazil

IndyCar Series
- Years active: 2008
- Teams: Conquest Racing
- Starts: 14
- Wins: 0
- Poles: 0

Previous series
- 2005-2007 2002-2004: Indy Pro Series; Formula Three Sudamericana

Jaime Câmara Neto (born November 5, 1980, in Goiânia) is a Brazilian race car driver, who in 2008 competed in the IndyCar Series for Conquest Racing.

== Motorsports career ==
=== Indy Racing League ===
Camara previously competed in the 2005 and 2006 seasons of the Indy Racing League's Indy Pro Series and finished fifth and sixth in series points, respectively. He has also won the 2005 Freedom 100, the Indy Pro Series' biggest race, from the pole.

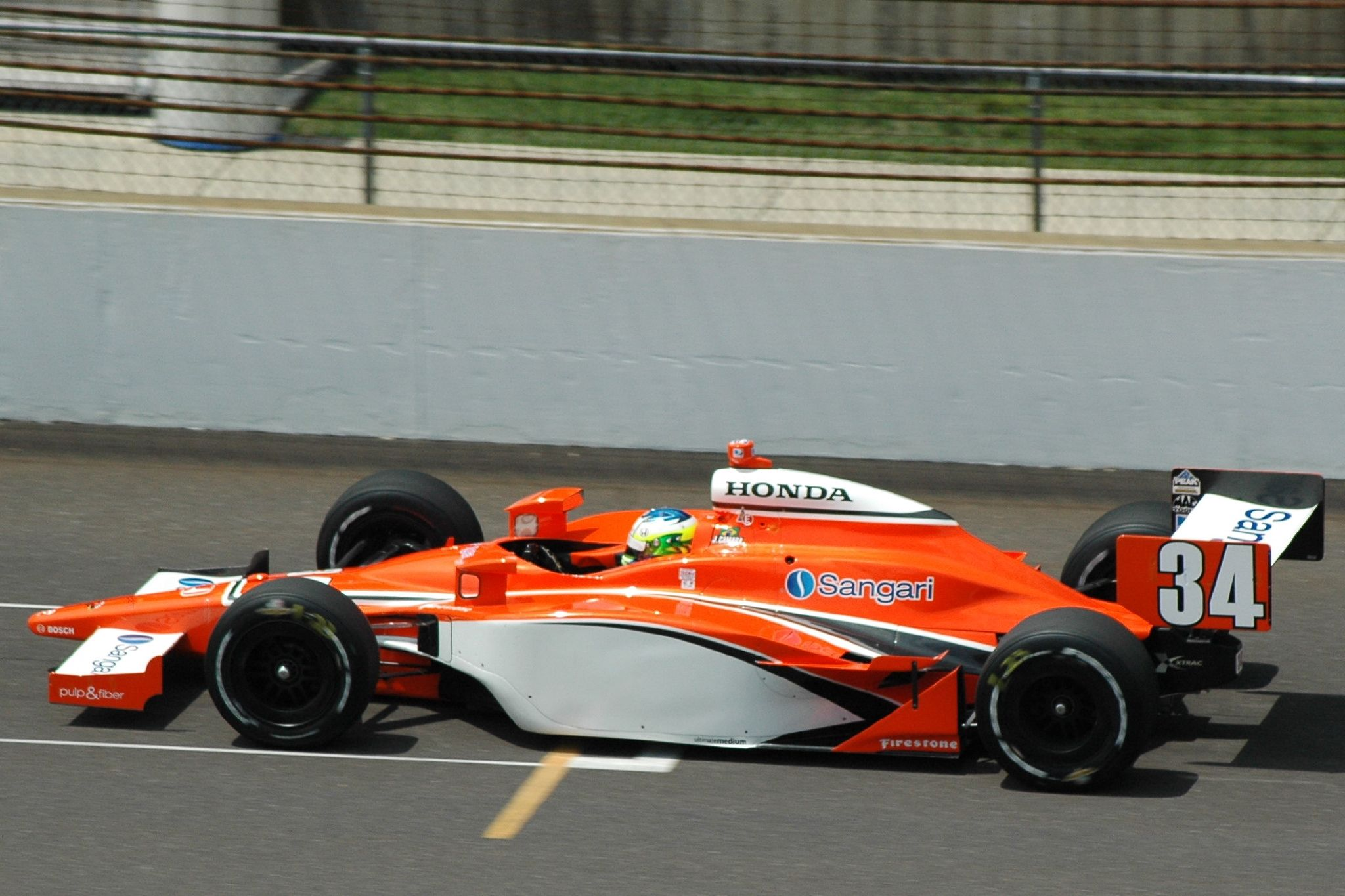
Camara practices for the 2008 Indianapolis 500.

Camara sought a ride in the Indy Racing League IndyCar Series during the 2006-2007 offseason, but could not put a deal together and returned to the IPS and Andretti Green Racing for the 2007 season. He finished sixth in points for the second year in a row without scoring a win.

On April 24, 2008, Camara was announced as the driver of the No. 34 Conquest Racing entry in the IndyCar Series beginning with the RoadRunner Turbo Indy 300 at Kansas Speedway and will remain through the balance of the season. At the Indianapolis 500, he pulled into the wrong pit box, delaying teammate Enrique Bernoldi in the process; he later crashed out in a single-car incident. After a very strong run at Richmond International Raceway, where he moved from a starting position of 24th up to first where he led 44 laps, he crashed out in another single-car incident. He finished the season 23rd in points. He participated in a test with the Conquest team prior to the 2009 season, but Alex Tagliani was named the driver for the team's single car prior to the beginning of the season.

== Motorsports career results ==
=== American Open-Wheel racing results ===
(key) (Races in bold indicate pole position)

==== Indy Lights ====
Year	Team	1	2	3	4	5	6	7	8	9	10	11	12	13	14	15	16	Rank	Points	Ref
2005	Sam Schmidt Motorsports	HMS; 2	PHX; 11	STP; 13	**INDY**; 1	TXS; 9	IMS; 5	**NSH**; 1	**MIL**; 5	KTY; 8	PPIR; 9	SNM; 12	CHI; 6	WGL; 7	FON; 10			**5th**	**403**	
2006	Andretti Green Racing	HMS; 11	STP1; 12	STP2; 15	INDY; 3	WGL; 4	IMS; 13	NSH; 2	MIL; 1	KTY; 14	SNM1; 7	SNM2; 14	CHI; 16					**6th**	**298**	
2007	AGR-AFS Racing	HMS; 4	STP1; 23	STP2; 8	INDY; 3	MIL; 17	IMS1; 3	IMS2; 5	IOW; 21	WGL1; 7	WGL2; 10	NSH; 3	MOH; 8	KTY; 5	SNM1; 5	SNM2; 17	CHI; 20	**6th**	**373**	

==== IndyCar ====
Year	Team	No.	1	2	3	4	5	6	7	8	9	10	11	12	13	14	15	16	17	18	19	Rank	Points	Ref
2008	Conquest Racing	34	HMS	STP	MOT^{1}	LBH^{1}	KAN; 21	INDY; 31	MIL; 24	TXS; 24	IOW; 20	RIR; 14	WGL; 18	NSH; 21	MOH; 14	EDM; 23	KTY; 16	SNM; 24	DET; 25	CHI; 18	SRF^{2} 19	23rd	174	

^{1} Races held on same day.
^{2} Non-points-paying exhibition race.

Years	Teams	Races	Poles	Wins	Podiums (Non-win)	Top 10s (Non-podium)	Indianapolis 500 Wins	Championships
1	1	14	0	0	0	0	0	0

==== Indianapolis 500 ====
Year	Chassis	Engine	Start	Finish	Team
2008	Dallara	Honda	30	31	Conquest

=== Complete GT1 World Championship results ===
Year	Team	Car	1	2	3	4	5	6	7	8	9	10	11	12	13	14	15	16	17	18	19	20	Pos	Points	Ref
2011	DKR Engineering	Corvette	ABU; QR; Ret	ABU; CR; 13	ZOL; QR; 9	ZOL; CR; Ret	ALG; QR	ALG; CR	SAC; QR	SAC; CR	SIL; QR	SIL; CR	NAV; QR	NAV; CR	PRI; QR	PRI; CR	ORD; QR	ORD; CR	BEI; QR	BEI; CR	SAN; QR	SAN; CR	37th	0	
