= 2008 Peak Antifreeze Indy Grand Prix =

IndyCar layout of Infineon Raceway (2005-2011)

The 2008 Peak Antifreeze & Motor Oil Indy Grand Prix of Sonoma County was the fifteenth round of the 2008 IndyCar Series season. It took place on August 24, 2008 at Sonoma Raceway.

A transporter carrying the Team Penske cars of Hélio Castroneves and Ryan Briscoe caught fire on the Wednesday before the race, destroying both cars. Racing in a backup car, Castroneves won the race from pole position, snapping a 29-race winless streak after finishing runner-up seven times in the 2008 season prior to Sonoma. The gap in the standings between Castroneves and points leader Scott Dixon closed by 35 points after Dixon finished 12th in the race.

== Race ==
Pos	No	Driver	Team	Laps	Time/Retired	Grid	Laps Led	Points
1	3	(Brazil) Hélio Castroneves	Team Penske	80	1:50:15.8282	1	51	50+3
2	6	(Australia) Ryan Briscoe	Team Penske	80	+5.2926	2	19	40
3	11	(Brazil) Tony Kanaan	Andretti Green Racing	80	+16.6032	4	1	35
4	10	(United Kingdom) Dan Wheldon	Chip Ganassi Racing	80	+17.7720	16	0	32
5	7	(United States) Danica Patrick	Andretti Green Racing	80	+25.8458	9	0	30
6	33	(Venezuela) E. J. Viso (R)	HVM Racing	80	+29.3472	14	9	28
7	4	(Brazil) Vítor Meira	Panther Racing	80	+29.9895	18	0	26
8	06	(United States) Graham Rahal (R)	Newman/Haas/Lanigan Racing	80	+40.4577	15	0	24
9	02	(United Kingdom) Justin Wilson (R)	Newman/Haas/Lanigan Racing	80	+42.0357	7	0	22
10	19	(Brazil) Mario Moraes (R)	Dale Coyne Racing	80	+50.0106	12	0	20
11	15	(United States) Buddy Rice	Dreyer & Reinbold Racing	80	+55.0361	22	0	19
12	9	(New Zealand) Scott Dixon	Chip Ganassi Racing	80	+55.7145	5	0	18
13	27	(Japan) Hideki Mutoh (R)	Andretti Green Racing	80	+56.3186	20	0	17
14	26	(United States) Marco Andretti	Andretti Green Racing	80	+57.5400	10	0	16
15	5	(Spain) Oriol Servià	KV Racing Technology	80	+58.3690	6	0	15
16	96	(Mexico) Mario Domínguez (R)	Pacific Coast Motorsports	80	+1:00.7387	11	0	14
17	18	(Brazil) Bruno Junqueira	Dale Coyne Racing	80	+1:00.9454	13	0	13
18	17	(United States) Ryan Hunter-Reay	Rahal Letterman Racing	80	+1:00.9466	8	0	12
19	23	(United States) Townsend Bell	Dreyer & Reinbold Racing	79	+1 Lap	19	0	12
20	2	(United States) A. J. Foyt IV	Vision Racing	79	+1 Lap	24	0	12
21	36	(Brazil) Enrique Bernoldi (R)	Conquest Racing	79	+1 Lap	27	0	12
22	14	(United Kingdom) Darren Manning	A. J. Foyt Racing	79	+1 Lap	21	0	12
23	20	(United States) Ed Carpenter	Vision Racing	78	+2 Laps	23	0	12
24	34	(Brazil) Jaime Camara (R)	Conquest Racing	78	+2 Laps	26	0	12
25	8	(Australia) Will Power (R)	KV Racing Technology	77	+3 Laps	3	0	10
26	25	(Canada) Marty Roth	Roth Racing	76	+4 Laps	25	0	10
27	12	(South Africa) Tomas Scheckter	Luczo Dragon Racing	56	Mechanical	17	0	10

Preceded by 2008 Meijer Indy 300	IRL IndyCar Series round 15; 2008	Succeeded by 2008 Detroit Indy Grand Prix
