= P. J. Abbott =

American racing driver (born 1964)

- Nationality: (United States) American
- Born: May 28, 1964 (age 62) Bloomington, Indiana, U.S.

Previous series
- 2004–2008 2004–2006: Indy Pro Series; NASCAR K&N Pro Series West

P. J. Abbott (born May 28, 1964) is an American racing driver. In 2004, he drove in two races in the Infiniti Pro Series for Michael Crawford Motorsports. Prior to that, he competed in US SCCA Formula Mazda and SCCA Formula Atlantic. He also raced in the NASCAR West Series four times in 2004 and 2005. His best finish in the series was thirteenth place at Stockton 99 Speedway.

== Motorsports career results ==
=== NASCAR ===
(key) (Bold – Pole position awarded by qualifying time. Italics – Pole position earned by points standings or practice time. * – Most laps led.)

==== AutoZone West Series ====
NASCAR Autozone West Series results
Year	Team	No.	Make	1	2	3	4	5	6	7	8	9	10	11	12	13	NAWC	Pts
2004	David Eshleman	6	Chevy	PHO	MMR	CAL	**S99**; DNQ	EVG	**IRW**; DNQ	**S99**; 13	RMR	DCS	PHO	CNS	MMR	IRW	34th	291
2005	David Eshleman	6	Chevy	PHO	MMR	PHO	S99	**IRW**; 15	EVG	S99	PPI	CAL	DCS				32nd	239
2005	Judy Midgley	90	Chevy											**CTS**; 15			32nd	239
2006	Judy Midgley	90	Chevy	PHO	PHO	S99	IRW	**SON**; 26	DCS	IRW	EVG	S99	CAL	CTS	AMP		75th	85

=== American open–wheel racing results ===
(key) (Races in bold indicate pole position)

==== Indy Lights ====
Year	Team	1	2	3	4	5	6	7	8	9	10	11	12	13	14	15	16	Rank	Points
2004	Sam Schmidt Motorsports	HOM	PHO	INDY	KAN	NSH	MIL	MCH	KEN	PPI	CHI	CAL; 7						20th	48
2004	Keith Duesenberg Racing												TEX; 9					20th	48
2005	Sam Schmidt Motorsports	HOM	PHO	STP	INDY	TEX; 11	IGP	NSH	MIL	KEN	PPI	SON	CHI	WGI	CAL; 8			18th	43
2006	Michael Crawford Motorsports	HOM	STP	STP	INDY	WGI	IGP	NSH	MIL; 11	KEN	SON; 13	SON; 12	CHI					25th	54
2007	Michael Crawford Motorsports	HOM	STP	STP	INDY	MIL; 15	IGP	IGP	IOW	WGI	WGI	NSH; 17	MOH	KEN	SON	SON	CHI; 7	29th	54
2008	Michael Crawford Motorsports	HOM	STP	STP	KAN	INDY	MIL	IOW	WGI	WGI	NSH	MOH	MOH	KEN; 19	SON	SON	CHI	39th	11
