= Jay Drake =

American racing driver

Jay Scott Drake (born July 5, 1969 in Santa Maria, California) is an American auto racing driver. In 2022, Drake was inaugurated into the United States Auto Club Hall of Fame.

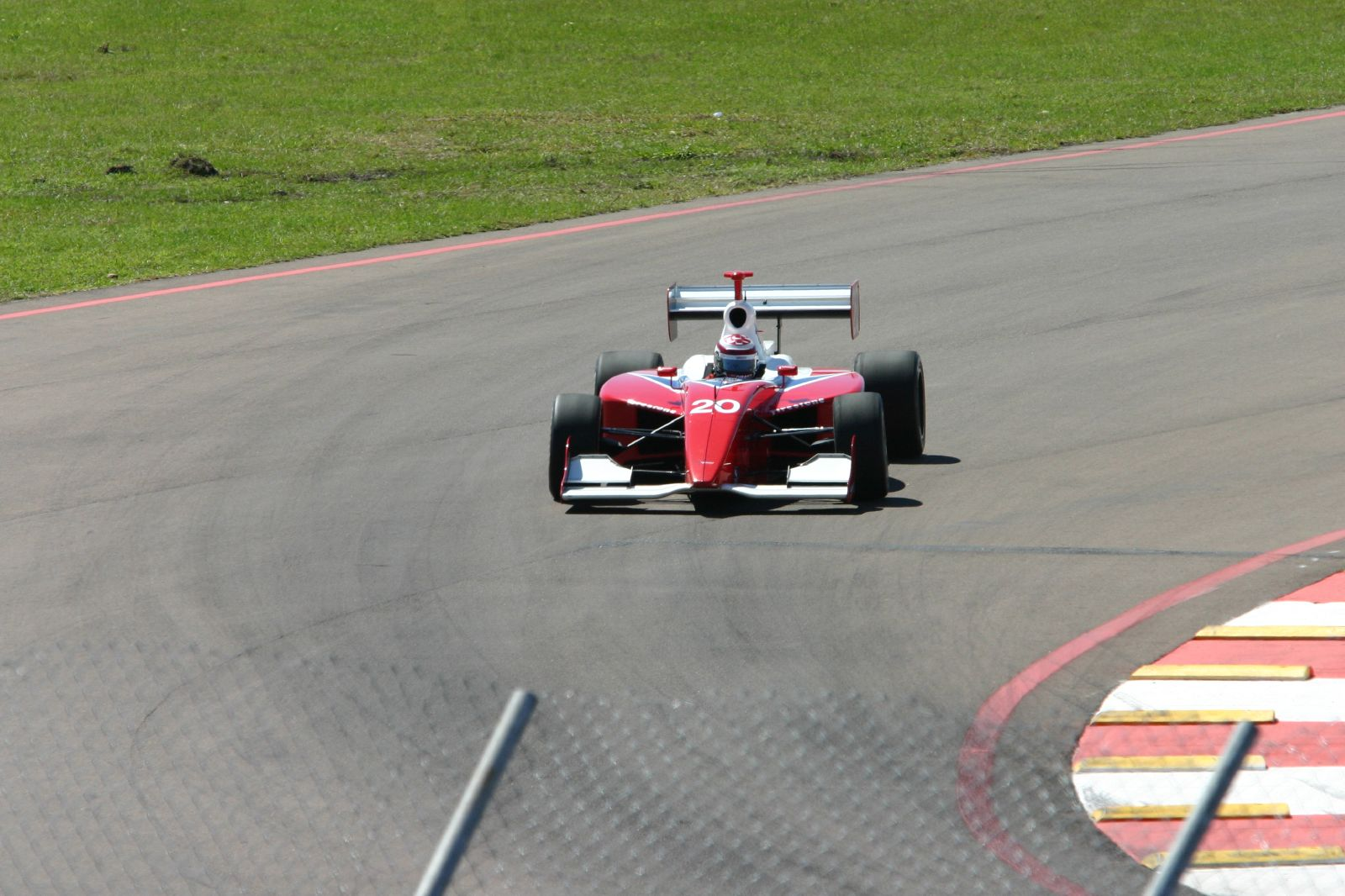
Drake driving an Infiniti Pro Series car for Vision Racing in 2005 on the Streets of St. Petersburg

== Racing career ==
Drake began driving midgets at age 23. In 1998, he won the Turkey Night Grand Prix midget car race. Drake was the USAC National Sprint Car Champion in 2004. He also competed in 14 Indy Pro Series races in 2004 and 2005 with a best finish of third and finishing ninth in the 2005 point standings. Drake is currently the team manager for Keith Kunz Motorsports USAC Midget Team.

In 2022, Drake was inducted into the United States Auto Club Hall of Fame.

== Awards ==
- 2004 USAC National Sprint Car Series Champion
- 2001 Chili Bowl winner
- 2000 Indiana Sprintweek Champion
- 1997 USAC National Midget Series "Most Improved Driver"
- 1996 Western States Midget Series Champion
- 1993 Western States Midget Series "Rookie of the Year"
- 1991 USAC TQ Midget Champion
- 1990 USAC TQ Midget Champion
- 1990 USAC TQ Midget "Rookie of the Year"

== Racing record ==
=== American open-wheel racing ===
(key) (Races in bold indicate pole position)

==== Indy Lights ====
Year	Team	1	2	3	4	5	6	7	8	9	10	11	12	13	14	Rank	Points
2004	AFS Racing	HMS	PHX	INDY; 4	KAN	NSH	MIL	MIS	KTY	PPIR	CHI	FON	TXS			**23rd**	**32**
2005	Vision Racing	HMS; 5	PHX; 13	STP; 10	INDY; 3	TXS; 4	IMS; 10	NSH; 3	MIL; 6	KTY; 4	PPIR; 8	SNM; 8	CHI; 7	WGL	FON; 12	**9th**	**341**
