= Travis Gregg =

American racing driver (born 1978)

- Nationality: American
- Born: March 28, 1978 (age 48) Camden, Ohio, U.S.

Firestone Indy Lights Series
- Years active: 2004-2008
- Teams: Sam Schmidt Motorsports; Guthrie Racing; Michael Crawford Motorsports; Team Moore Racing
- Starts: 24
- Wins: 3
- Poles: 7
- Best finish: 3rd in 2005

Previous series
- 2000-2004 1998-1999: USAC Sprint Cars; SCCA Formula Atlantic

Travis Gregg (born March 28, 1978) is an American racing driver from Camden, Ohio.

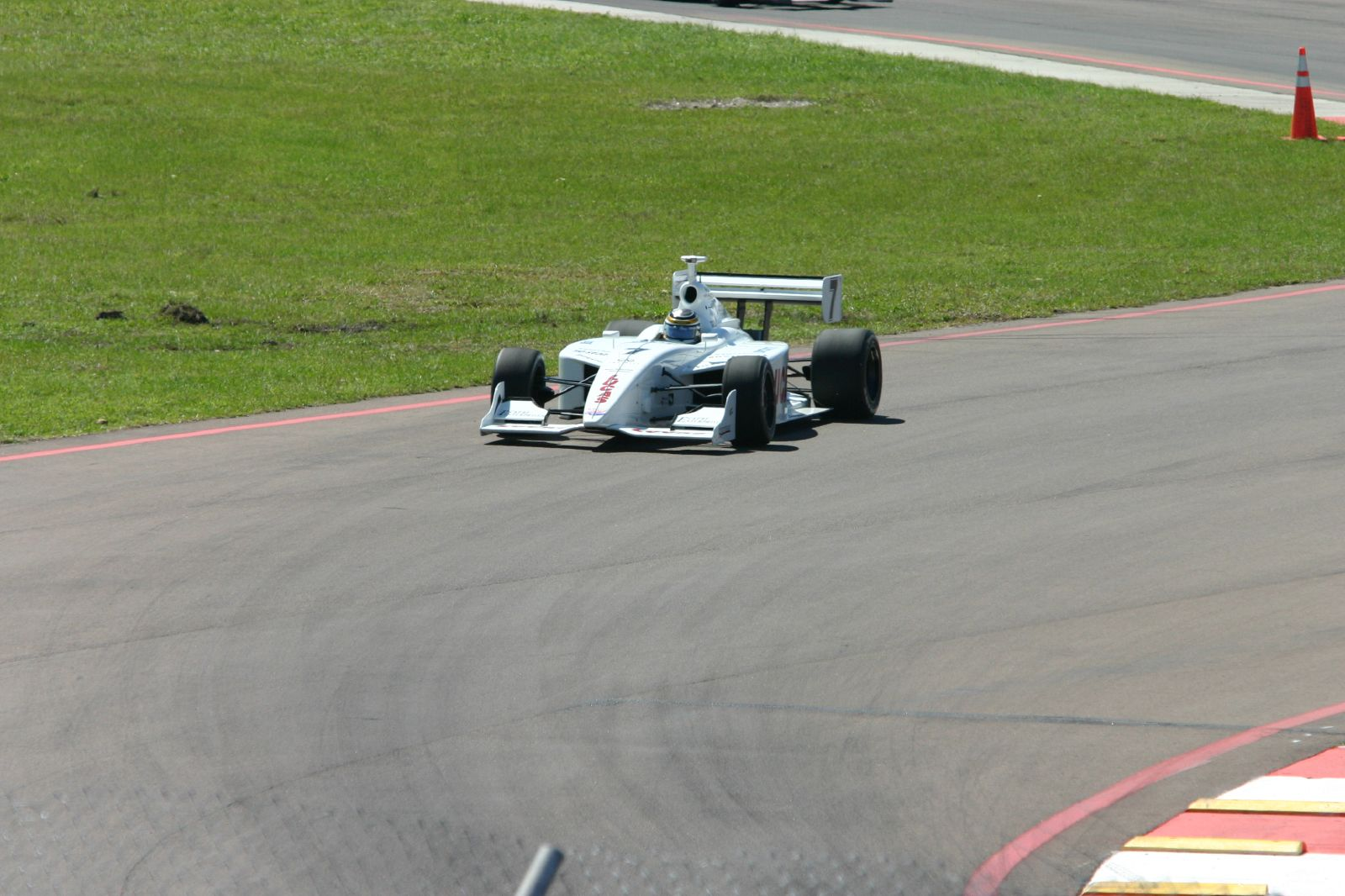
Gregg driving on the Streets of St. Petersburg in 2005

After karting, Gregg began in cars in amateur SCCA Formula Atlantic in 1998 and 1999 while attending Miami University. He graduated in 2000 and ventured into sprint car racing, competing in a number of series across the midwestern United States. In 2004, he began racing in the Infiniti Pro Series (now called Indy Lights) and sat on pole in his first series race at Kentucky Speedway. He captured his first win from the pole in the first race of the following season at Homestead Miami Speedway and finished third in series points for Sam Schmidt Motorsports, also winning at Kentucky and Texas Motor Speedway. Despite his success in 2005, Gregg did not have a full-time ride in 2006 and participated in 3 races as a substitute driver, a role which he continued to fill in 2007 and 2008, driving in two races in each of those years. After his racing career, Gregg worked as a spotter in the IndyCar Series.

== Motorsport career ==
=== American open-wheel results ===
(key) (Races in bold indicate pole position) (Races in italics indicate fastest lap)

==== Indy Lights ====
Year	Team	1	2	3	4	5	6	7	8	9	10	11	12	13	14	15	16	Rank	Points
2004	Sam Schmidt Motorsports	HMS	PHX	INDY	KAN	NSH	MIL	MIS	**KTY**; 5	PPIR	CHI; 13	FON	TXS; 2					15th	89
2005	Sam Schmidt Motorsports	**HMS**; 1	**PHX**; 6	STP; 6	INDY; 6	**TXS**; 1	IMS; 7	NSH; 10	MIL; 8	**KTY**; 1	**PPIR**; 3	SNM; 6	CHI; 5	WGL; 12	**FON**; 3			3rd	462
2006	Guthrie Racing	HMS; 12	STP1	STP2	INDY	WGL	IMS											23rd	67
2006	Michael Crawford Motorsports							NSH; 13	MIL									23rd	67
2006	Sam Schmidt Motorsports									KTY; 4	SNM1	SNM2	CHI					23rd	67
2007	Team Moore Racing	HMS	STP1	STP2	INDY	MIL	IMS1	IMS2	IOW	WGL1	WGL2	NSH	MOH	KTY; 10	SNM1	SNM2		32nd	34
2007	Sam Schmidt Motorsports																CHI; 16	32nd	34
2008	Sam Schmidt Motorsports	HMS	STP1	STP2	KAN	INDY	MIL	IOW; 21	WGL1	WGL2	NSH	MOH1	MOH2	KTY; 24	SNM1	SNM2	CHI	38th	15
