= 2008 Camping World Indy Grand Prix at the Glen =

(United States) 2008 Watkins Glen
Race details
- 10th round of the 2008 IndyCar Series season
- Date: July 6, 2008
- Official name: Camping World Watkins Glen Grand Prix
- Location: Watkins Glen International
- Course: Road Course; 3.370 mi / 5.423 km
- Distance: 60 laps 202.200 mi / 325.409 km

Pole position
- Driver: (Australia) Ryan Briscoe ( (United States) Team Penske)
- Time: 1:29.3456

Fastest lap
- Driver: (Australia) Ryan Briscoe ( (United States) Team Penske)
- Time: 1:31.2585 (on lap 19 of 60)

Podium
- First: (United States) Ryan Hunter-Reay ( (United States) Rahal Letterman Racing)
- Second: (United Kingdom) Darren Manning ( (United States) A. J. Foyt Enterprises)
- Third: (Brazil) Tony Kanaan ( (United States) Andretti Green Racing)

The 2008 Camping World Indy Grand Prix at the Glen was the tenth round of the 2008 IndyCar Series season and took place on July 6, 2008 at the 3.370-mile (5.423 km) Watkins Glen International road course in Watkins Glen, New York. The race was won by Ryan Hunter-Reay, who took the lead from Darren Manning on lap 52. The victory was Hunter-Reay's first in IndyCar competition, and the first for Rahal Letterman Racing since 2005.

== Qualifying ==
- All cars are split into two groups of thirteen, with the fastest six from each group going through to the "Top 12" session. In this session, the fastest six runners will progress to the "Firestone Fast Six". The fastest driver in this final session will claim pole, with the rest of the runners lining up in session order, regardless of qualifying times. (Fast Six from 1-6, Top 12 from 7-12 and Round 1 from 13-26) Drivers can use as many laps as they want in the timed sessions.

Pos	Nat	Name	Team	Group 1	Group 2	Top 12	Firestone Fast Six
1	(Australia)	Ryan Briscoe	Team Penske		1:29.8485	1:29.3527	1:29.3456
2	(United Kingdom)	Justin Wilson	Newman/Haas/Lanigan Racing		1:29.9808	1:29.2544	1:29.3804
3	(United States)	Ryan Hunter-Reay	Rahal Letterman Racing		1:30.1855	1:29.9757	1:29.6355
4	(New Zealand)	Scott Dixon	Chip Ganassi Racing		1:30.1494	1:29.5743	1:29.6776
5	(Spain)	Oriol Servià	KV Racing Technology	1:30.7608		1:29.9530	1:29.7068
6	(Brazil)	Tony Kanaan	Andretti Green Racing	1:30.6044		1:29.5724	1:29.9938
7	(United States)	Marco Andretti	Andretti Green Racing	1:31.0299		1:29.9968	
8	(United Kingdom)	Darren Manning	A. J. Foyt Enterprises	1:30.6445		1:30.0474	
9	(United Kingdom)	Dan Wheldon	Chip Ganassi Racing	1:30.7040		1:30.0567	
10	(Brazil)	Vítor Meira	Panther Racing		1:30.1152	1:30.1172	
11	(Brazil)	Bruno Junqueira	Dale Coyne Racing	1:30.4443		1:30.6213	
12	(Australia)	Will Power	KV Racing Technology		1:29.8548	1:32.8542	
13	(Brazil)	Mario Moraes	Dale Coyne Racing		1:30.3409		
14	(United States)	Danica Patrick	Andretti Green Racing		1:30.5647		
15	(Venezuela)	E. J. Viso	HVM Racing		1:30.6885		
16	(Brazil)	Enrique Bernoldi	Conquest Racing		1:31.0196		
17	(United States)	Buddy Rice	Dreyer & Reinbold Racing	1:31.0470			
18	(United States)	Graham Rahal	Newman/Haas/Lanigan Racing	1:31.2402			
19	(Mexico)	Mario Domínguez	Pacific Coast Motorsports	1:31.3614			
20	(Japan)	Hideki Mutoh	Andretti Green Racing	1:31.4704			
21	(United States)	Ed Carpenter	Vision Racing		1:32.2381		
22	(United States)	A. J. Foyt IV	Vision Racing	1:32.8496			
23	(Brazil)	Jaime Camara	Conquest Racing	1:34.5517			
24	(United Kingdom)	Jay Howard	Roth Racing		1:35.0154		
25	(Venezuela)	Milka Duno	Dreyer & Reinbold Racing		1:36.0330		
26	(Brazil)	Hélio Castroneves	Team Penske	No time			

== Race ==
Pos	No.	Driver	Team	Laps	Time/Retired	Grid	Laps Led	Points
1	17	(United States) Ryan Hunter-Reay	Rahal Letterman Racing	60	1:54:01.1795	3	9	50
2	14	(United Kingdom) Darren Manning	A. J. Foyt Enterprises	60	+2.4009	8	10	40
3	11	(Brazil) Tony Kanaan	Andretti Green Racing	60	+4.1054	6	0	35
4	15	(United States) Buddy Rice	Dreyer & Reinbold Racing	60	+4.8111	17	0	32
5	26	(United States) Marco Andretti	Andretti Green Racing	60	+5.3132	7	0	30
6	18	(Brazil) Bruno Junqueira	Dale Coyne Racing	60	+5.8084	11	0	28
7	19	(Brazil) Mario Moraes	Dale Coyne Racing	60	+8.6248	13	0	26
8	06	(United States) Graham Rahal	Newman/Haas/Lanigan Racing	60	+9.4563	18	0	24
9	27	(Japan) Hideki Mutoh	Andretti Green Racing	60	+10.1785	20	0	22
10	33	(Venezuela) E. J. Viso	HVM Racing	60	+10.8602	15	0	20
11	9	(New Zealand) Scott Dixon	Chip Ganassi Racing	60	+11.0455	4	0	19
12	6	(Australia) Ryan Briscoe	Penske Racing	60	+11.5953	1	37	21
13	96	(Mexico) Mario Domínguez	Pacific Coast Motorsports	60	+12.7773	19	0	17
14	7	(United States) Danica Patrick	Andretti Green Racing	60	+26.6599	14	0	16
15	8	(Australia) Will Power	KV Racing	60	+38.1033	12	0	15
16	3	(Brazil) Hélio Castroneves	Penske Racing	59	+1 Lap	26	0	14
17	20	(United States) Ed Carpenter	Vision Racing	59	+1 Lap	21	0	13
18	34	(Brazil) Jaime Camara	Conquest Racing	51	Crash	23	0	12
19	2	(United States) A. J. Foyt IV	Vision Racing	47	Crash	22	0	12
20	23	(Venezuela) Milka Duno	Dreyer & Reinbold Racing	45	Crash	25	0	12
21	36	(Brazil) Enrique Bernoldi	Conquest Racing	44	Crash	16	0	12
22	4	(Brazil) Vítor Meira	Panther Racing	38	Crash	10	4	12
23	5	(Spain) Oriol Servià	KV Racing	38	Electrical	5	0	12
24	10	(United Kingdom) Dan Wheldon	Chip Ganassi Racing	19	In Pits	9	0	12
25	02	(United Kingdom) Justin Wilson	Newman/Haas/Lanigan Racing	16	Mechanical	2	0	10
26	24	(United Kingdom) Jay Howard	Roth Racing	15	Steering	24	0	10
