= 2008 Rexall Edmonton Indy =

Coordinates: 53°34′32″N 113°31′22.5″W

(Canada) 2008 Rexall Edmonton Indy
Race details
- 13 round of the 2008 IndyCar Series season
- Date: July 26, 2008
- Official name: Rexall Edmonton Indy
- Location: Rexall Speedway, Edmonton, Alberta, Canada
- Course: Temporary Airport Course; 1.973 mi / 3.175 km
- Distance: 91 laps 179.543 mi / 288.925 km
- Weather: Mostly cloudy with temperatures reaching up to 29 °C (84 °F)

Pole position
- Driver: (Australia) Ryan Briscoe ( (United States) Team Penske)
- Time: 1:00.731

Fastest lap
- Driver: (Australia) Will Power ( (United States) KV Racing Technology)
- Time: 1:02.023 (on lap 69 of 91)

Podium
- First: (New Zealand) Scott Dixon ( (United States) Target Chip Ganassi Racing)
- Second: (Brazil) Hélio Castroneves ( (United States) Team Penske)
- Third: (United Kingdom) Justin Wilson ( (United States) Newman/Haas/Lanigan Racing)

The 2008 Rexall Edmonton Indy was the thirteenth round of the 2008 IndyCar Series season, and was held on July 26, 2008, at Rexall Speedway in Edmonton, Alberta, Canada. The race was won by Scott Dixon, followed by Hélio Castroneves and Justin Wilson. Although it was the fourth edition of the Grand Prix, it was the first race in the IndyCar Series, but also the first IndyCar Series race to be held in Canada.

== Qualifying results ==
Pos	Nat	Name	Team	Qual 1	Qual 2	Qual 3	Best
1	(Australia)	Ryan Briscoe	Team Penske	1:01.660	1:01.236	1:00.731	1:00.731
2	(Brazil)	Hélio Castroneves	Team Penske	1:01.164	1:00.946	1:00.836	1:00.836
3	(Spain)	Oriol Servià	KV Racing Technology	1:01.844	1:01.092	1:00.858	1:00.858
4	(New Zealand)	Scott Dixon	Chip Ganassi Racing	1:01.426	1:01.108	1:00.859	1:00.859
5	(Australia)	Will Power	KV Racing Technology	1:01.464	1:01.117	1:01.015	1:01.015
6	(United Kingdom)	Justin Wilson	Newman/Haas/Lanigan Racing	1:01.552	1:01.185	no time	1:01.185
7	(Brazil)	Bruno Junqueira	Dale Coyne Racing	1:02.175	1:01.299	-	1:01.299
8	(United States)	Graham Rahal	Newman/Haas/Lanigan Racing	1:01.826	1:01.457	-	1:01.457
9	(United Kingdom)	Dan Wheldon	Chip Ganassi Racing	1:01.603	1:01.666	-	1:01.603
10	(Brazil)	Mario Moraes (R)	Dale Coyne Racing	1:01.506	1:01.755	-	1:01.506
11	(Brazil)	Enrique Bernoldi (R)	Conquest Racing	1:02.044	1:02.023	-	1:02.023
12	(Brazil)	Tony Kanaan	Andretti Green Racing	1:01.701	no time	-	1:01.701
13	(United States)	Marco Andretti	Andretti Green Racing	1:02.299	-	-	1:02.299
14	(United States)	Ryan Hunter-Reay	Rahal Letterman Racing	1:02.104	-	-	1:02.104
15	(United States)	Danica Patrick	Andretti Green Racing	1:02.417	-	-	1:02.417
16	(Canada)	Paul Tracy	Vision Racing	1:02.239	-	-	1:02.239
17	(Brazil)	Vítor Meira	Panther Racing	1:02.239	-	-	1:02.491
18	(United States)	A. J. Foyt IV	Vision Racing	1:03.135	-	-	1:03.135
19	(United Kingdom)	Darren Manning	A. J. Foyt Enterprises	1:02.664	-	-	1:02.664
20	(Mexico)	Mario Domínguez	Pacific Coast Motorsports	1:03.136	-	-	1:03.136
21	(Venezuela)	E. J. Viso (R)	HVM Racing	1:02.924	-	-	1:02.924
22	(Japan)	Hideki Mutoh	Andretti Green Racing	1:03.810	-	-	1:03.810
23	(United States)	Buddy Rice	Dreyer & Reinbold Racing	1:03.428	-	-	1:03.428
24	(United States)	Ed Carpenter	Vision Racing	1:03.883	-	-	1:03.883
25	(United States)	Townsend Bell	Dreyer & Reinbold Racing	1:03.640	-	-	1:03.640
26	(Canada)	Marty Roth	Roth Racing	1:09.050	-	-	1:09.050
27	(Brazil)	Jaime Camara (R)	Conquest Racing	1:03.857	-	-	1:03.857

== Race ==
Pos	No	Driver	Team	Laps	Time/Retired	Grid	Points
1	9	(New Zealand) Scott Dixon	Chip Ganassi Racing	91	1:51:05.704	4	50
2	3	(Brazil) Hélio Castroneves	Team Penske	91	+5.9 secs	2	43
3	02	(United Kingdom) Justin Wilson	Newman/Haas/Lanigan Racing	91	+13.4 secs	6	35
4	22	(Canada) Paul Tracy	Vision Racing	91	+28.1 secs	15	32
5	5	(Spain) Oriol Servià	KV Racing Technology	91	+28.7 secs	3	30
6	6	(Australia) Ryan Briscoe	Team Penske	91	+36.9 secs	1	28
7	10	(United Kingdom) Dan Wheldon	Chip Ganassi Racing	91	+41.8 secs	9	26
8	17	(United States) Ryan Hunter-Reay	Andretti Green Racing	91	+42.1 secs	13	24
9	11	(Brazil) Tony Kanaan	Andretti Green Racing	91	+43.1 secs	27	22
10	14	(United Kingdom) Darren Manning	A. J. Foyt Enterprises	91	+43.3 secs	18	20
11	15	(United States) Buddy Rice	Dreyer & Reinbold Racing	91	+48.4 secs	22	19
12	2	(United States) A. J. Foyt IV	Vision Racing	91	+50.1 secs	17	18
13	20	(United States) Ed Carpenter	Vision Racing	91	+57.6 secs	23	17
14	18	(Brazil) Bruno Junqueira	Dale Coyne Racing	91	+61.1 secs	7	16
15	33	(Venezuela) E. J. Viso (R)	HVM Racing	90	+ 1 lap	20	15
16	36	(Brazil) Enrique Bernoldi (R)	Conquest Racing	90	+ 1 lap	11	14
17	26	(United States) Marco Andretti	Andretti Green Racing	90	+ 1 lap	12	13
18	7	(United States) Danica Patrick	Andretti Green Racing	88	+ 3 laps	14	12
19	4	(Brazil) Vítor Meira	Panther Racing	85	+ 6 laps	16	12
20	19	(Brazil) Mario Moraes (R)	Dale Coyne Racing	85	+ 6 laps	10	12
21	25	(Canada) Marty Roth	Roth Racing	84	+ 7 laps	25	12
22	8	(Australia) Will Power	KV Racing Technology	72	+ 19 laps	5	12
23	34	(Brazil) Jaime Camara (R)	Conquest Racing	68	Mechanical	26	12
24	96	(Mexico) Mario Domínguez	Pacific Coast Motorsports	51	Off Course	19	12
25	23	(United States) Townsend Bell	Dreyer & Reinbold Racing	48	Contact	24	10
26	06	(United States) Graham Rahal	Newman/Haas/Lanigan Racing	44	Contact	8	10
27	27	(Japan) Hideki Mutoh	Andretti Green Racing	27	Contact	21	10

== Caution flags ==
Laps	Cause
19-23	Meira (4) spin
29-32	Mutoh (27) contact
49-54	Bell (23) contact
61-64	Rahal (06)/Viso (33) contact

== Notes ==
Laps	Leader
1-3	Ryan Briscoe
4-21	Hélio Castroneves
22-29	Marco Andretti
30	Tony Kanaan
31-33	Marco Andretti
34-50	Hélio Castroneves
51-56	Tony Kanaan
57-59	A. J. Foyt IV
60-61	Tony Kanaan
62-91	Scott Dixon

Driver	Laps led
Hélio Castroneves	35
Scott Dixon	30
Marco Andretti	11
Tony Kanaan	9
A. J. Foyt IV	3
Ryan Briscoe	3

- Fastest Lap Will Power: 1:02.023 (Lap 68)
- Average Speed 96.967 mph

== Attendance ==
Race weekend attendance was estimated 160,000.

Previous race: 2008 The Honda 200 at Mid-Ohio	IndyCar Series; 2008 season	Next race: 2008 Meijer Indy 300
Previous race: 2007 Rexall Grand Prix of Edmonton	2008 Rexall Edmonton Indy	Next race: 2009 Rexall Edmonton Indy
