= Vision Racing =

Former IndyCar team

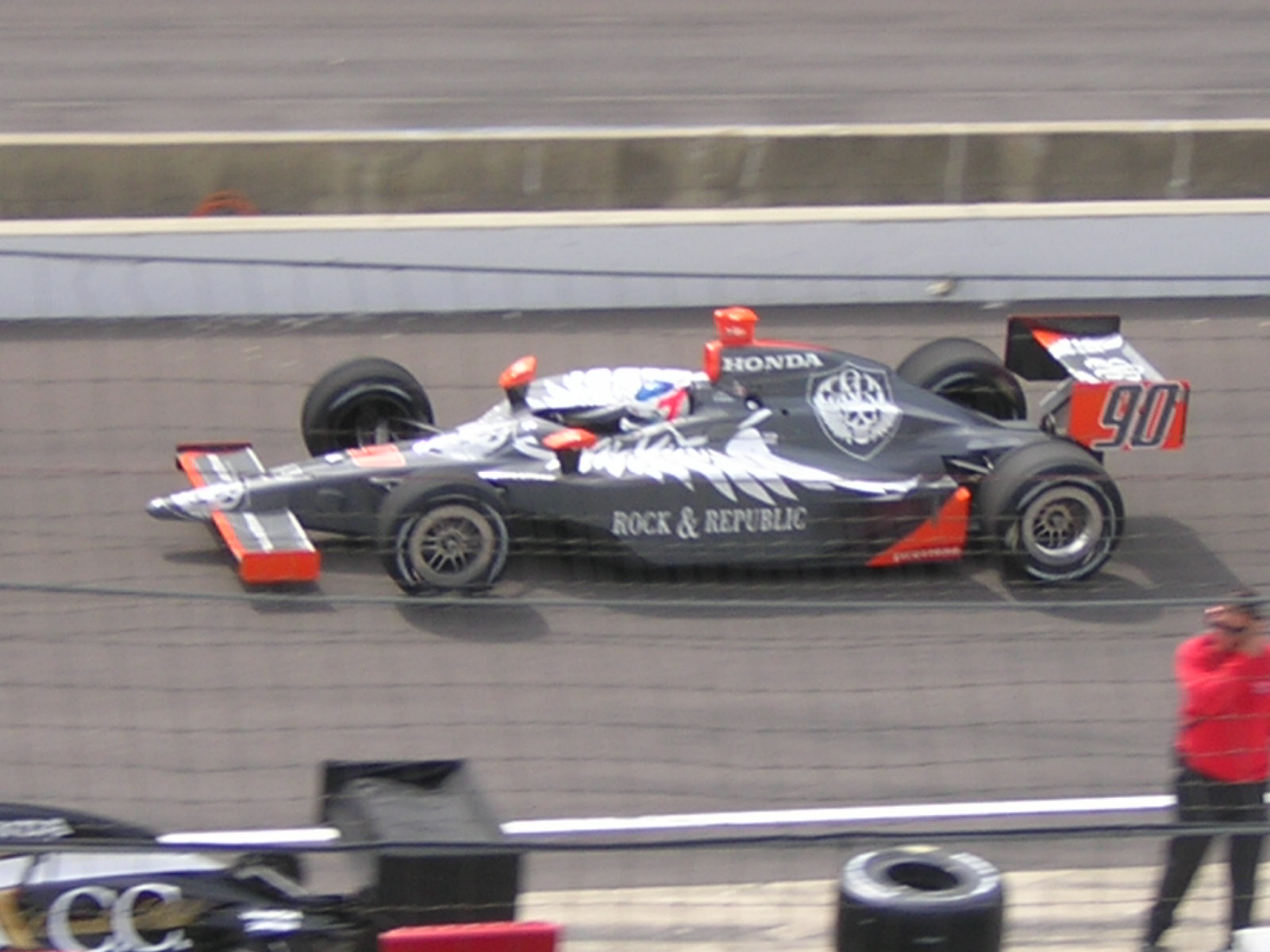
Townsend Bell driving the No. 90 Rock & Republic Vision Racing Dallara/Honda/Firestone entry during practice for the 90th running of the Indianapolis 500

Vision Racing was a racing team in the Indy Racing League founded in 2005 when Tony George purchased the assets of the defunct Kelley Racing and hired his stepson Ed Carpenter to be the driver. The team has previously raced in the Izod IndyCar Series, Firestone Indy Lights and the Grand-Am Sports Car Series. The team suspended operations in January 2010.

George and Carpenter formed a new race team in 2012, Ed Carpenter Racing.

== Season history ==
=== 2005 ===
In its first season in the IRL the team was consistently one of the slowest on the track. Although, Carpenter finished 11th in the 2005 Indianapolis 500 and added the team's first top-10 finish at Nashville Superspeedway. Carpenter ended the season eighteenth in driver points and the team finished a disappointing twentieth in entrant points. The team also fielded Nick Bussell and Jay Drake in the Indy Pro Series. Drake picked up five top five finishes and ended up ninth in points while Bussell had eleven top five finishes and finished an impressive fourth in points. Though both drivers did very well the team did not return to the Pro Series the following year.

=== 2006 ===
The team returned in 2006 hiring of a new team engineer and expansion to two cars with veteran race winner Tomas Scheckter. The team fared much better with Scheckter capturing a 3rd-place finish at the Milwaukee Mile and finishing 10th in points while Carpenter improved from 18th to 14th in points and captured his first top-five. The team also fielded the number 90 Rock & Republic car driven by Townsend Bell for the Indy 500. Bell retired early from the race as did Scheckter, but Carpenter finished in eleventh. Actor Patrick Dempsey also joined the team in 2006 as co-owner.

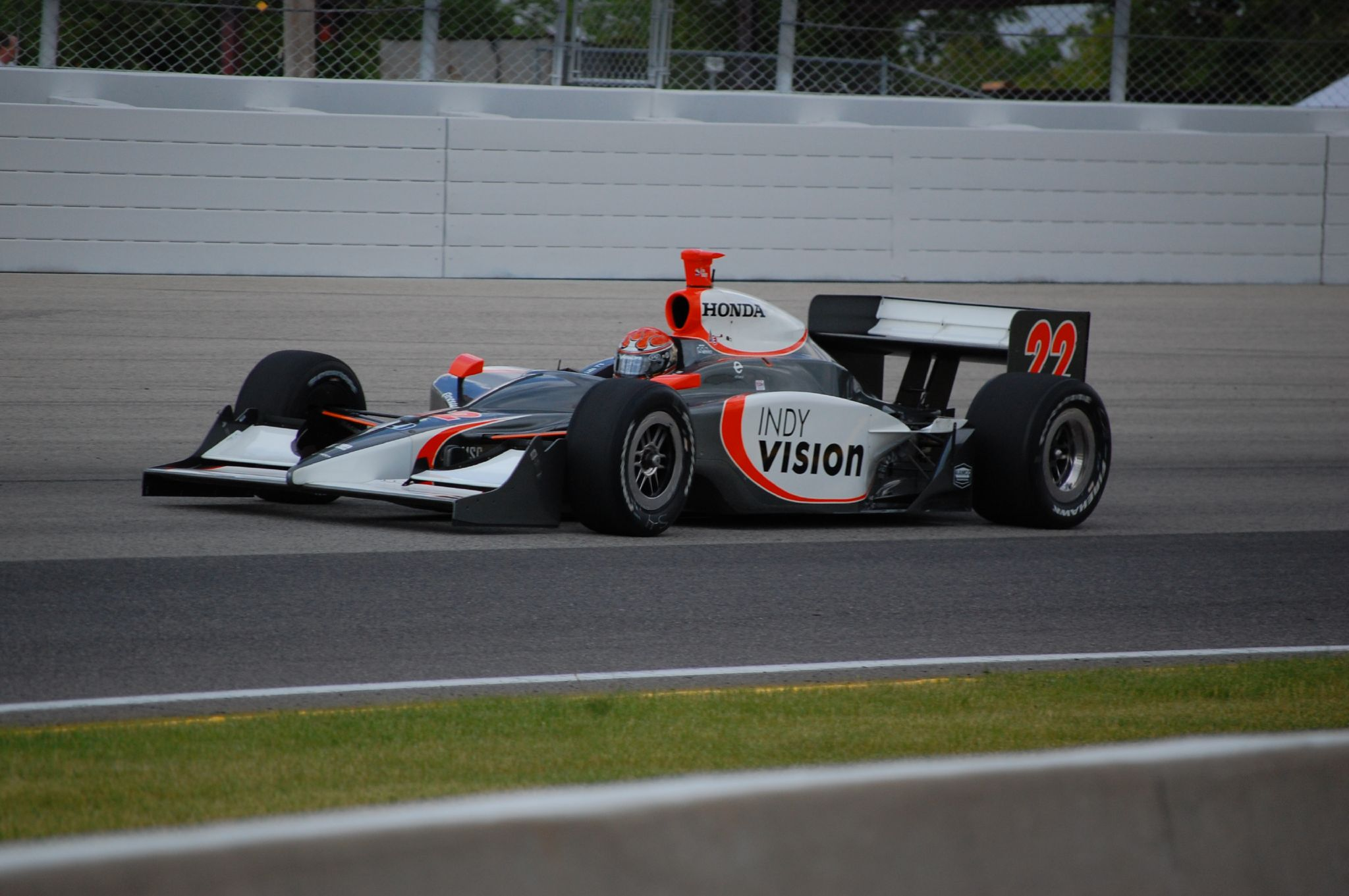
A. J. Foyt IV driving Vision's #22 car at the Milwaukee Mile in 2007

=== 2007 ===
In 2007 the team expanded to three cars with the addition of A. J. Foyt IV and picked up Hitachi, Lowe's and Joost as sponsors. Foyt matched Scheckter's team-best 3rd-place finish with a race-leading run at Kentucky Speedway. Vision fielded a fourth car driven by veteran Davey Hamilton and sponsored by HP for the Indy 500. Hamilton finished an impressive ninth just two spots behind teammate Thomas Scheckter in seventh. Scheckter finished tenth in points with Foyt finishing fourteenth and Carpenter finishing in fifteenth.

=== 2008 ===
The team returned to 2 cars in 2008 with Carpenter and Foyt IV sponsored by Menards, DirecTV, and CardioCheck. Vision looked strong at Homestead Miami Speedway posting impressive speeds during practice. Carpenter qualified second and Foyt qualified third. However, the team was penalized and had to start in the last two positions after failing technical inspection. The IRL confiscated all the team's rear wings but did not specify on the problem. The team later fired team manager Larry Curry because of the incident. Carpenter finished the season fifteenth in points and his teammate Foyt finished nineteenth. Vision Racing entered a third car for the Indy 500 and ran Davey Hamilton as the driver and HP as a sponsor. They ran a third car for Paul Tracy at the Rexall Edmonton Indy in conjunction with Walker Racing with Subway Restaurants as the sponsor.

=== 2009 ===
In 2009 Ryan Hunter-Reay joined the team alongside the returning Carpenter, and immediately posted the team's best ever finish with a 2nd place at the opening St. Petersburg race. Carpenter matched the result by taking his best career finish of 2nd at Kentucky Speedway in an exciting duel with Ryan Briscoe, with Briscoe edging him at the line.

=== 2010 ===
On January 28, George was forced to suspend operations due to lack of sponsorship. George later paired up with Panther Racing for a part-time program for his stepson, Ed Carpenter.

== Drivers who have driven for Vision Racing ==
- (United States) John Andretti (2008) (Grand-Am Sports Car Series)
- (United States) Townsend Bell (2006) (IndyCar Series)
- (United States) Nick Bussell (2005) (Indy Lights)
- (United States) Ed Carpenter (2005–2009) (IndyCar Series, Indy Lights, and Grand-Am Sports Car Series)
- (Australia) James Davison (2009) (Indy Lights)
- (United States) Jay Drake (2005) (Indy Lights)
- (United States) A. J. Foyt IV (2007–2008) (IndyCar Series and Grand-Am Sports Car Series)
- (United States) Tony George (2007–2008) (Grand-Am Sports Car Series)
- (United States) Phil Giebler (2005) (Indy Lights)
- (France) Stephan Gregoire (2007) (Grand-Am Sports Car Series)
- (United States) Davey Hamilton (2007, 2008) (IndyCar Series; Indy 500 only)
- (United States) Ryan Hunter-Reay (2009) (IndyCar Series)
- (Brazil) Vítor Meira (2008) (Grand-Am Sports Car Series)
- (South Africa) Tomas Scheckter (2006–2007) (IndyCar Series and Grand-Am Sports Car Series)
- (Canada) Paul Tracy (2008) (IndyCar Series; Rexall Edmonton Indy only)

== Racing results ==
=== Complete IRL IndyCar Series results ===
(key)

Year	Chassis	Engine	Tyres	Drivers	No.	1	2	3	4	5	6	7	8	9	10	11	12	13	14	15	16	17	18	19	Pts Pos	Pts
2005						HMS	PHX	STP	MOT	INDY	TXS	RIR	KAN	NSH	MIL	MCH	KTY	PPIR	SNM	CHI	WGL	FON				
2005	Dallara IR-05	Toyota Indy V8	F	(United States) Ed Carpenter	20	18	16	19	16	11	20	12	17	10	12	23	22	19	15	17	14	20			18th	244
2005	Dallara IR-05	Toyota Indy V8	F	(United States) Jeff Ward	22					27															35th	10
2006						HMS	STP	MOT	INDY	WGL	TXS	RIR	KAN	NSH	MIL	MCH	KTY	SNM	CHI							
2006	Dallara IR-05	Honda HI6R V8	F	(South Africa) Tomas Scheckter	2	9	12	13	27	10	10	7	7	15	3	5	7	17	10						10th	298
2006	Dallara IR-05	Honda HI6R V8	F	(United States) Ed Carpenter	20	DNS		20	11	6	9	8	16	10	16	7	11	12	5						14th	252
2006	Dallara IR-05	Honda HI6R V8	F	(Brazil) Roberto Moreno	20		18																		30th	12
2006	Dallara IR-05	Honda HI6R V8	F	(United States) Townsend Bell	90				22																34th	12
2007						HMS	STP	MOT	KAN	INDY	MIL	TXS	IOW	RIR	WGL	NSH	MDO	MCH	KTY	SNM	DET	CHI				
2007	Dallara IR-05	Honda HI7R V8	F	(South Africa) Tomas Scheckter	2	8	6	9	5	7	17	14	19	7	13	11	9	11	5	8	13	20			10th	357
2007	Dallara IR-05	Honda HI7R V8	F	(United States) Ed Carpenter	20	6	18	15	17	17	7	18	6	10	12	13	16	14	7	13	10	16			15th	309
2007	Dallara IR-05	Honda HI7R V8	F	(United States) A. J. Foyt IV	22	18	13	13	9	14	13	17	12	13	15	12	13	8	3	15	9	10			14th	315
2007	Dallara IR-05	Honda HI7R V8	F	(United States) Davey Hamilton	02					9															26th	22
2008						HMS	STP	MOT	LBH	KAN	INDY	MIL	TXS	IOW	RIR	WGL	NSH	MDO	EDM	KTY	SNM	DET	CHI	SRF^{1}		
2008	Dallara IR-05	Honda HI7R V8	F	(United States) A. J. Foyt IV	2	9	11	15		8	21	17	12	5	24	19	22	18	12	20	20	10	13	17	19th	280
2008	Dallara IR-05	Honda HI7R V8	F	(United States) Ed Carpenter	20	5	18	6		10	5	20	9	23	11	17	8	15	13	6	23	14	28	20	15th	320
2008	Dallara IR-05	Honda HI7R V8	F	(United States) Davey Hamilton	22						14														36th	16
2008	Dallara IR-05	Honda HI7R V8	F	(Canada) Paul Tracy	22														4^{2}						33rd	51
2009						STP	LBH	KAN	INDY	MIL	TXS	IOW	RIR	WGL	TOR	EDM	KTY	MDO	SNM	CHI	MOT	HMS				
2009	Dallara IR-05	Honda HI7R V8	F	(United States) Ed Carpenter	20	18	18	9	8	16	9	10	13	16	15	16	2	17	11	6	13	12			12th	321
2009	Dallara IR-05	Honda HI7R V8	F	(United States) Ryan Hunter-Reay	21	2	11	15	32	12	16														15th	298

1. Non-points-paying, exhibition race.
2. Run in conjunction with Walker Racing.
