= Gavin Ward (engineer) =

Canadian Formula One engineer (born 1984)

- Born: November 11, 1984 (age 42); Toronto
- Occupation: Engineer

Gavin Ward (born November 11, 1984) is a Canadian engineer who works for Rahal Letterman Lanigan in the IndyCar Series.

== Career ==
Ward grew up in Toronto. Whilst studying at Malvern Collegiate, he began volunteering with a local Formula Ford racing team. After finishing high school, Ward moved to England to study automotive engineering at Oxford Brookes University.

After initially getting his start with an internship in Red Bull Racing's R&D department, Ward rapidly rose through the ranks. Within 6 months RBR had moved him up to the race team where over the next 9 years he worked in various key roles including: trackside control systems engineer, tyre & vehicle dynamics engineer, and race engineer alongside David Coulthard, Mark Webber, Sebastian Vettel, and Daniel Ricciardo. In that time, he helped RBR to progress from a 7th place constructor to a 4x double championship winning and 50+ Grand Prix winning powerhouse.

After RBR finished first and second at the 2013 Abu Dhabi Grand Prix, Ward went up on the podium to collect the trophy for winning constructor on behalf of Red Bull Racing. At the end of 2014, Ward moved into aero design at RBR.

Ward moved to the IndyCar Series in 2018 as a race engineer for Team Penske. He joined Arrow McLaren SP on January 4, 2022. On November 19, 2024, he left Arrow McLaren. After serving a one-year gardening leave from Arrow McLaren, Ward moved to Rahal Letterman Lanigan on November 25, 2025, where he was tasked with helping to turn the team's fortunes around.
