= Juho Annala =

Finnish racing driver (born 1984)

Juho Annala (born February 24, 1984) is a Finnish racing driver.

Annala was born in Lapua. After starting in karting, he moved to Swedish, Finnish, and Nordic Formula Ford in 2004, winning the Nordic championship and coming second in both the Swedish and Finnish championships. In 2005, he moved to the British Formula Three Championship driving for Alan Docking Racing in the national class of the championship. He finished sixth in series points scoring three podium finishes. In 2006, he switched teams to Performance Racing Europe and captured three wins and three pole positions on his way to third in the championship. In 2007, he drove in the International Formula Master series for Jenzer Motorsport and finished eleventh in points with a runner up finish at Brno.

Annala drove in the 2008 Grand Prix of Long Beach, the final Champ Car race, for Rocketsports but was knocked out by mechanical problems after 42 laps after qualifying last. Later in the year, he made two starts in the Finnish Super Touring Championship.

== IndyCar ==
Year	Team	No.	Chassis	Engine	1	2	3	4	5	6	7	8	9	10	11	12	13	14	15	16	17	18	19	Rank	Points	Ref
2008	Rocketsports	10	Panoz DP01	Cosworth	HMS	STP	MOT^{1}	LBH^{1} 18	KAN	IND	MIL	TXS	IOW	RIR	WGL	NSH	MDO	EDM	KTY	SNM	DET	CHI	SRF^{2}	47th	0	

¹ Run on same day.
² Non-points-paying, exhibition race.
