= 2008 Iowa Corn Indy 250 =

(United States) 2008 Iowa
Race details
- 8th round of the 2008 IndyCar Series season
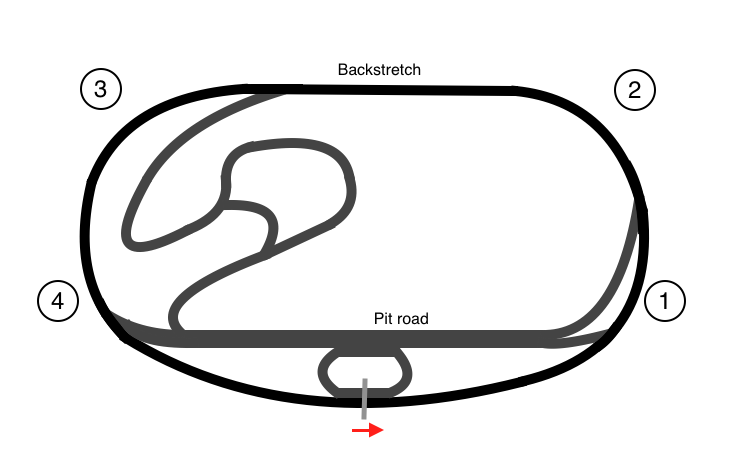
- Date: June 22, 2008
- Official name: Iowa Corn Indy 250
- Location: Iowa Speedway
- Course: Permanent racing facility 0.894 mi / 1.439 km
- Distance: 250 laps 223.500 mi / 359.688 km
- Weather: 80 °F (27 °C), Sunny

Pole position
- Driver: (New Zealand) Scott Dixon ( (United States) Chip Ganassi Racing)
- Time: set by driver points

Fastest lap
- Driver: (Australia) Ryan Briscoe ( (United States) Penske Racing)
- Time: 17.4908 (on lap 233 of 250)

Podium
- First: (United Kingdom) Dan Wheldon ( (United States) Chip Ganassi Racing)
- Second: (Japan) Hideki Mutoh ( (United States) Andretti Green Racing)
- Third: (United States) Marco Andretti ( (United States) Andretti Green Racing)

The 2008 Iowa Corn Indy 250 was the eighth round of the 2008 IndyCar Series season. The race was held on June 22, 2008 at the 0.894-mile (1.439 km) Iowa Speedway in Newton, Iowa. At the green flag, Hélio Castroneves took the lead in turn 1 from polesitter Scott Dixon. Tony Kanaan quickly moved up to second position. Over the next 10-15 laps, Castroneves and Kanaan battled back-and-forth for the lead, side-by-side on many laps. Kanaan finally muscled the lead away on lap 16, and gained a lead of roughly one second. On lap 39, Ed Carpenter brushed the outside wall in turn 2. The leaders pit, and Kanaan exited the pits as the leader. On lap 51, the green came back out, and a lap later, Castroneves got by Kanaan for the lead. Jaime Camara brought out the yellow on lap 106 when his car lost power and stopped on the course. After another sequence of pit stops, Kanaan led Dan Wheldon and Marco Andretti. On the restart, Wheldon lost control and slid up the track, falling to 8th place.

On lap 157 Mario Moraes spun into the pit apron, bringing out a caution, and the leaders pitted. John Andretti's pitcrew had trouble engaging the fuel hose, and he dropped back the end of the running order. Prior to this he had been running in 7th place, one of the highest positions ever for a Roth Racing car. Castroneves regained the lead on lap 170, and held it until another yellow came out on lap 188 for a spin by Enrique Bernoldi. Most of the leaders pitted, but Wheldon, Hideki Mutoh, and Danica Patrick stayed out to lead the field. On the restart Moraes spun for the second time of the day, and prolonged the yellow until lap 202. On lap 212, Kanaan (running third) suddenly lost control and crashed in turn 1.

On the lap 227 restart, Marco Andretti and Dixon passed Patrick to take third and fourth place respectively. Over the final 15 laps, Mutoh and Marco Andretti battled for second, with Mutoh holding off Andretti's challenge. Wheldon went on to win, and Chip Ganassi Racing donated their race winnings from both cars to Iowa flood relief. After getting by Patrick late in the race, A. J. Foyt IV finished in the top 5, while John Andretti just missed the top 10, working his way back to 11th.

== Result ==
Finish	Car No.	Driver	Team	Laps	Time/Retired	Grid	Laps Led	Points
1	10	(United Kingdom) Dan Wheldon	Chip Ganassi Racing	250	1:38:35.8923	3	61	50
2	27	(Japan) Hideki Mutoh (R)	Andretti Green Racing	250	+0.1430	7	0	40
3	26	(United States) Marco Andretti	Andretti Green Racing	250	+0.9028	8	26	35
4	9	(New Zealand) Scott Dixon	Chip Ganassi Racing	250	+1.2726	1	0	32
5	2	(United States) A. J. Foyt IV	Vision Racing	250	+1.3564	18	0	30
6	7	(United States) Danica Patrick	Andretti Green Racing	250	+1.9115	6	0	28
7	6	(Australia) Ryan Briscoe	Penske Racing	250	+3.9780	5	0	26
8	17	(United States) Ryan Hunter-Reay (R)	Rahal Letterman Racing	250	+4.4488	14	0	24
9	8	(Australia) Will Power (R)	KV Racing	250	+5.6158	11	0	22
10	06	(United States) Graham Rahal	Newman/Haas/Lanigan Racing	250	+7.7886	16	0	20
11	24	(United States) John Andretti	Roth Racing	250	+8.4639	23	0	19
12	02	(United Kingdom) Justin Wilson (R)	Newman/Haas/Lanigan Racing	250	+8.7225	20	0	18
13	33	(Venezuela) E. J. Viso (R)	HVM Racing	250	+12.5775	13	0	17
14	3	(Brazil) Hélio Castroneves	Penske Racing	248	+2 Laps	2	92	19
15	4	(Brazil) Vítor Meira	Panther Racing	248	+2 Laps	12	0	15
16	5	(Spain) Oriol Servià (R)	KV Racing	247	+3 Laps	10	0	14
17	36	(Brazil) Enrique Bernoldi	Conquest Racing	242	+ 8 Laps	17	0	13
18	11	(Brazil) Tony Kanaan	Andretti Green Racing	211	Contact	4	71	12
19	19	(Brazil) Mario Moraes (R)	Dale Coyne Racing	192	Contact	24	0	12
20	34	(Brazil) Jaime Camara (R)	Conquest Racing	133	Handling	21	0	12
21	14	(United Kingdom) Darren Manning	A. J. Foyt Enterprises	94	Handling	19	0	12
22	15	(United States) Buddy Rice	Dreyer & Reinbold Racing	78	Handling	15	0	12
23	20	(United States) Ed Carpenter	Vision Racing	38	Contact	9	0	12
24	23	(Venezuela) Milka Duno	Dreyer & Reinbold Racing	26	Handling	22	0	12
25	18	(Brazil) Bruno Junqueira	Dale Coyne Racing	0	DNS	25	0	5
26	25	(Canada) Marty Roth	Roth Racing	0	DNS	26	0	5
Race average speed: 136.007 mph (218.882 km/h)
Lead changes: 9 between 4 drivers
Cautions: 6 for 57 laps

Previous race: 2008 Bombardier Learjet 550	IndyCar Series; 2008 season	Next race: 2008 SunTrust Indy Challenge
Previous race: 2007 Iowa Corn Indy 250	2008 Iowa Corn Indy 250	Next race: 2009 Iowa Corn Indy 250
