= 2008 IndyCar Series =

American auto racing season

2008 IndyCar season
- IndyCar Series

Season
- Races: 19
- Start date: March 29
- End date: October 26

Awards
- Drivers' champion: (New Zealand) Scott Dixon
- Rookie of the Year: (Japan) Hideki Mutoh
- Indianapolis 500 winner: (New Zealand) Scott Dixon

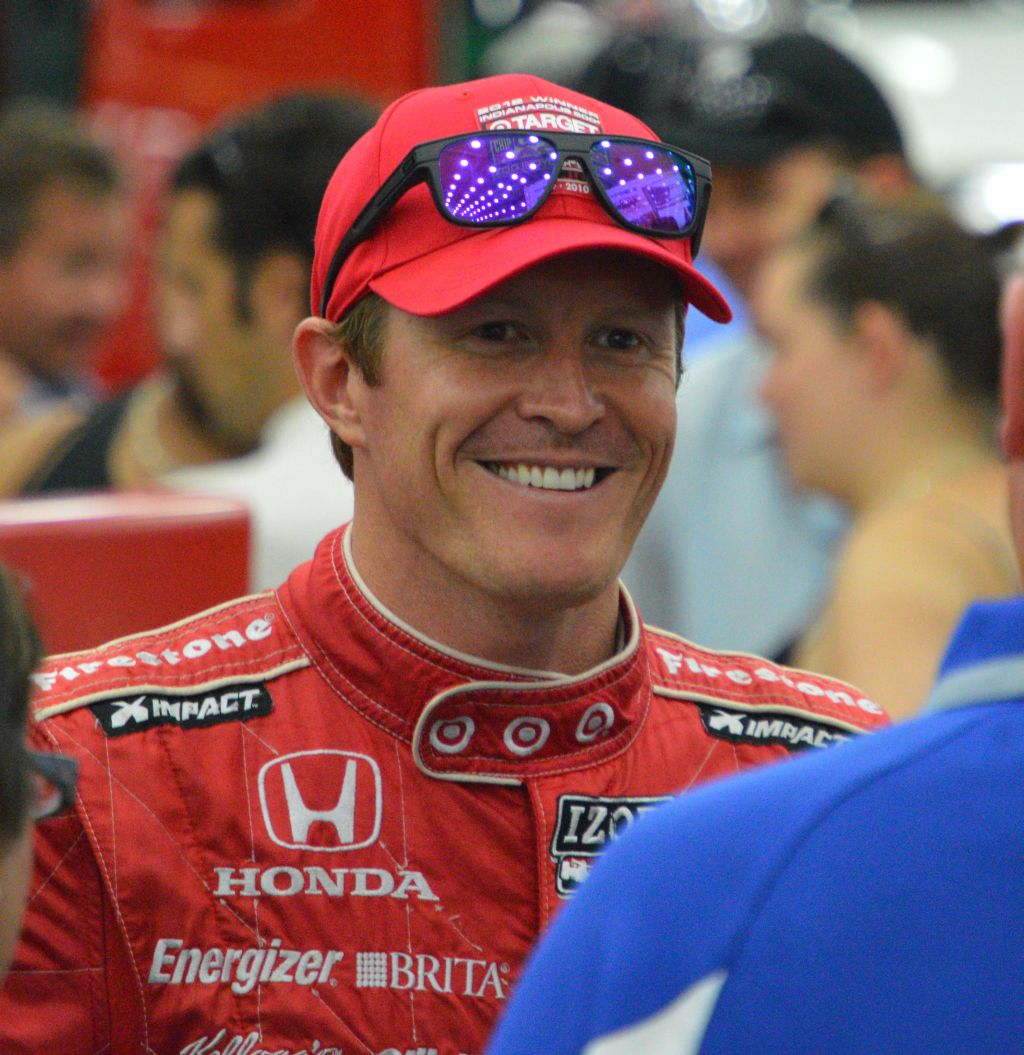
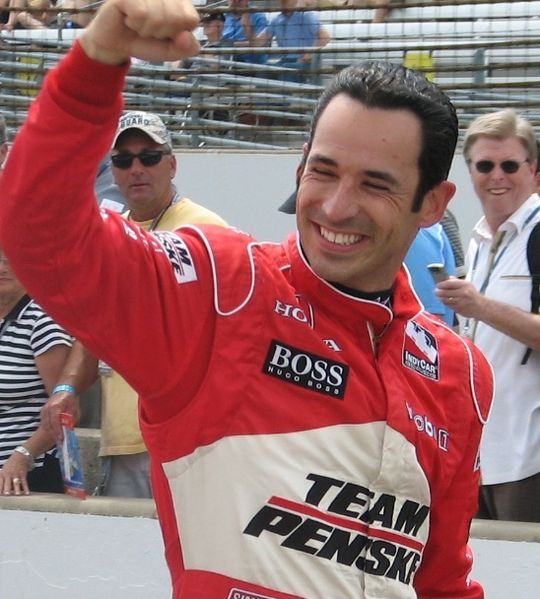
Scott Dixon (left) won his second Drivers' Championship while Hélio Castroneves (right) finished second in the championship.

The 2008 IndyCar Series was the 13th season of the IndyCar Series. It was the 97th recognized season of top-level American open wheel racing. It began on March 29, 2008, and ended on September 7 after 17 point-scoring races, plus a non-championship event on October 26.

The season was historically significant, as IndyCar became the single major open wheel racing series in the United States. After 12 years of direct competition, the managements of Indy Racing League and Champ Car announced an agreement to become a single entity in February, which led to the cancellation of the 2008 Champ Car World Series. A number of teams, drivers and race events joined the series, bolstering numbers and signaling a new era for open wheel racing in the United States after years of sporting and financial hardship.

Scott Dixon, driving for Chip Ganassi Racing, achieved his second championship and the first 'unified' title by winning six races, including his first victory at the Indianapolis 500, becoming the third driver in a row to complete the IndyCar–Indy 500 double in the same season. Hideki Mutoh, driving for Andretti Green Racing, won Rookie of the Year honors.

== Background and series news ==
=== Unification with Champ Car ===
On January 23, 2008, Robin Miller reported that Tony George had offered to Champ Car management a proposal that included free cars and engine leases to Champ Car teams willing to run the entire 2008 IndyCar Series schedule in exchange for adding Champ Car's dates at Long Beach, Toronto, Edmonton, Mexico City, and Australia to the IndyCar Series schedule, effectively uniting American open wheel racing. The offer was initially made in November 2007. On February 10, 2008, Tony George, along with IRL representatives Terry Angstadt and Brian Barnhart, plus former Honda executive Robert Clarke, traveled to Japan to discuss moving the Indy Japan 300 at Twin Ring Motegi. Moving that race, or postponing it, would be required in order to accommodate the Long Beach Grand Prix, which was scheduled for the same weekend. Optimism following the meeting was high.

On February 19, 2008, Robin Miller reported on SPEED and Curt Cavin blogged on IndyStar.com that the managements of Indy Racing League and Champ Car had come to an agreement to become one entity. The move would effectively end a 12-year split and unite American Open Wheel racing. Meanwhile, Brian Barnhart announced that Tony George was negotiating the unification, and an inventory of available IndyCar chassis and equipment for the Champ Car teams was underway. On February 22, Cavin initially reported that no deal had been reached between the IRL and CCWS in a lengthy dinner meeting between George and CCWS president Kevin Kalkhoven the previous evening. Later in the day, however, the unification agreement was finally announced by IndyCar, with final details being provided in a press conference on February 27.

The new unified series was centered around IndyCar Series' existing schedule, car and engine/tires suppliers, signifying the end of the Champ Car World Series as a stand-alone series. It was also the end for the Panoz DP01 after just one year of service, and for Cosworth as an engine supplier in Indy car racing. Under the offer of free cars and engines, plus technical assistance from existing IndyCar teams, six of the nine teams scheduled to compete in Champ Car were able to continue operations in the series. The unification agreement enjoyed massive support from both sides of the Split and other racing competitors, though some criticism was levied over the late timing for Champ Car teams, the costly and forced obsolescence of the Panoz DP01, the loss of many staple Champ Car events and the perceived masquerading of a 'takeover' by IndyCar as a 'merger' deal.

=== Other news ===
Prior to the unification, the bigger news surrounding IndyCar on the sporting side was the departure of its two most recent champions and Indianapolis 500 winners to the NASCAR Sprint Cup Series. Reigning champion Dario Franchitti and three-time champion Sam Hornish Jr. elected to race in the popular stock car circuit, following in the steps of other former open-wheel drivers such as Juan Pablo Montoya, Jacques Villeneuve, Patrick Carpentier, A. J. Allmendinger, Scott Speed and Max Papis. At the same time, four-time Champ Car champion Sébastien Bourdais had departed the rival series to join Formula 1, a year after Allmendinger went the NASCAR route that teammate Paul Tracy almost followed.

The field also lost Scott Sharp, the 1996 co-champion of the Indy Racing League, who departed the series after 12 seasons to drive in the American Le Mans Series after an acrimonious split with Rahal Letterman Racing. Franchitti, Hornish and Sharp combined for five championships, 46 wins and 36 pole positions during their open-wheel careers.

With the prospect of existing teams downsizing their full-time operations in an already thin field, IndyCar announced a revenue sharing plan entitled IndyCar TEAM (Team Enhancement and Allocation Matrix) for 2008.

- Teams would receive a minimum of US$1.2 million for each car competing in the full schedule.
- Race purses were eliminated for all events except for the Indianapolis 500.
- The top five finishers in each race were eligible for special cash bonuses.
- The total purse for the 2008 Indianapolis 500 increased with the winner receiving US$2.5 million, 33rd place paying no less than $270,000. Indy-only entries were eligible for the $270,000 minimum along with the full-season entries. The entire race purse totalled at least US$13.4 million, not including contingency awards. In 2007, race winner Dario Franchitti received $1,645,233, and last place Roberto Moreno won $224,805.
- The season champion won $1 million, as they had in earlier seasons. Second through fifth in the season championship were eligible for cash bonuses.

During the off-season, IndyCar enlisted the services of Tony Cotman as Vice President of Competition, who had worked for Champ Car the previous three seasons as Vice President of Operations and race director.

Off the track, Hélio Castroneves became a massive sensation and attained celebrity status after participating and winning the fifth season of ABC's Dancing with the Stars. An estimated audience of 24.90 million viewers saw Castroneves win the final show, with an average viewership of 21.67 million spectators over the season. Andretti Green Racing driver Danica Patrick, who already enjoyed major national recognition, further expanded her reach by prominently featuring in the Sports Illustrated Swimsuit Issue.

== Rule changes ==
- Semi-automatic paddle shifters became mandatory for full time series entrants, while remaining optional for Indianapolis 500-only entries.
- Cars were fitted with a "Zylon" synthetic-fiber intrusion barrier.
- Fuel mixture adjustment control was reinstated.
- For the oval track events, qualifying changed from a single-lap speed (over a two-lap attempt) to a four-lap speed, similar to the traditional method used at the Indianapolis 500 for most of its history.
- Due to the added cars brought by unification, the road and street course qualifying procedure was altered from a two-round format to a three-round 'knockout' qualifying format (similar to Formula One). Single-car qualifying was replaced by a pair of preliminary timed sessions, each composed of half of the field, where the six fastest drivers from each session would proceed to an additional timed session with 12 drivers. The six fastest drivers from that session would compete for the pole in the Firestone Fast Six.

== Confirmed entries ==
The following teams, entries, and drivers competed in the 2008 IndyCar Series season.

Team	Chassis	Engine	Tire	No.	Drivers	Round(s)	Ref(s)
(United States) A. J. Foyt Racing	Dallara	Honda	F	14	(United Kingdom) Darren Manning	1-2, 3A, 4-17	
(United States) A. J. Foyt Racing	Dallara	Honda	F	14	(Brazil) Vítor Meira	NC	
(United States) A. J. Foyt Racing	Dallara	Honda	F	41	(United States) Jeff Simmons	5	
(United States) A. J. Foyt Racing	Dallara	Honda	F	41	(France) Franck Perera R	17	
(United States) American Dream Motorsports	Panoz GF09C	Honda	F	88	(United States) Phil Giebler R	5	
(United States) Andretti Green Racing	Dallara	Honda	F	7	(United States) Danica Patrick	1-2, 3A, 4-17, NC	
(United States) Andretti Green Racing	Dallara	Honda	F	11	(Brazil) Tony Kanaan	1-2, 3A, 4-17, NC	
(United States) Andretti Green Racing	Dallara	Honda	F	26	(United States) Marco Andretti	1-2, 3A, 4-17, NC	
(United States) Andretti Green Racing	Dallara	Honda	F	27	(Japan) Hideki Mutoh R	1-2, 3A, 4-17, NC	
(United States) Chip Ganassi Racing	Dallara	Honda	F	9	(New Zealand) Scott Dixon	1-2, 3A, 4-17, NC	
(United States) Chip Ganassi Racing	Dallara	Honda	F	10	(United Kingdom) Dan Wheldon	1-2, 3A, 4-17	
(United States) Chip Ganassi Racing	Dallara	Honda	F	10	(United Kingdom) Dario Franchitti	NC	
(United States) Conquest Racing	Dallara; Panoz DP01^{1}	Honda; Cosworth^{1}	F B^{1}	34	(France) Franck Perera R	1–2, 3B	
(United States) Conquest Racing	Dallara; Panoz DP01^{1}	Honda; Cosworth^{1}	F B^{1}	34	(Brazil) Jaime Camara R	4–17, NC	
(United States) Conquest Racing	Dallara; Panoz DP01^{1}	Honda; Cosworth^{1}	F B^{1}	36	(Brazil) Enrique Bernoldi R	1–2, 3B, 4-16	
(United States) Conquest Racing	Dallara; Panoz DP01^{1}	Honda; Cosworth^{1}	F B^{1}	36	(Canada) Alex Tagliani	16–17, NC	
(United States) CURB/Agajanian/Beck Motorsports	Dallara	Honda	F	77	(United States) Roger Yasukawa	3A	
(United States) CURB/Agajanian/Beck Motorsports	Dallara	Honda	F	98	(United States) Roger Yasukawa	5	
(United States) Dale Coyne Racing	Dallara; Panoz DP01^{1}	Honda; Cosworth^{1}	F B^{1}	18	(Brazil) Bruno Junqueira	1-2, 3B, 4-17, NC	
(United States) Dale Coyne Racing	Dallara; Panoz DP01^{1}	Honda; Cosworth^{1}	F B^{1}	19	(Brazil) Mario Moraes R	1-2, 3B, 4-17, NC	
(United States) Dreyer & Reinbold Racing	Dallara	Honda	F	15	(United States) Buddy Rice	1-2, 3A, 4-17, NC	
(United States) Dreyer & Reinbold Racing	Dallara	Honda	F	23	(Venezuela) Milka Duno	1, 4–5, 7–8, 10–12, 14, 16–17	
(United States) Dreyer & Reinbold Racing	Dallara	Honda	F	23	(United States) Townsend Bell	2, 3A, 6, 9, 13, 15, NC	
(United States) Dreyer & Reinbold Racing	Dallara	Honda	F	99	(United States) Townsend Bell	5	
(United States) Hemelgarn Johnson Racing	Dallara	Honda	F	91	(United States) Buddy Lazier	5	
(United States) HVM Racing	Dallara; Panoz DP01^{1}	Honda; Cosworth^{1}	F B^{1}	33	(Venezuela) E. J. Viso R	1–2, 3B, 4-10, 12–17, NC	
(United States) KV Racing Technology	Dallara; Panoz DP01^{1}	Honda; Cosworth^{1}	F B^{1}	5	(Spain) Oriol Servià	1-2, 3B, 4-17, NC	
(United States) KV Racing Technology	Dallara; Panoz DP01^{1}	Honda; Cosworth^{1}	F B^{1}	8	(Australia) Will Power R	1-2, 3B, 4-17, NC	
(United States) Luczo Dragon Racing	Dallara	Honda	F	12	(South Africa) Tomas Scheckter	4–5, 7, 15–17	
(United States) Newman/Haas/Lanigan Racing	Dallara; Panoz DP01^{1}	Honda; Cosworth^{1}	F B^{1}	02	(United Kingdom) Justin Wilson R	1-2, 3B, 4-17, NC	
(United States) Newman/Haas/Lanigan Racing	Dallara; Panoz DP01^{1}	Honda; Cosworth^{1}	F B^{1}	06	(United States) Graham Rahal R	2, 3B, 4–17, NC	
(United States) Pacific Coast Motorsports	Panoz DP01^{1} Dallara	Cosworth^{1} Honda	B^{1} F	96	(Mexico) Mario Domínguez R	3B, 5–7, 10, 12–13, 15	
(United States) Panther Racing	Dallara	Honda	F	4	(Brazil) Vítor Meira	1-2, 3A, 4-17	
(United States) Panther Racing	Dallara	Honda	F	4	(United Kingdom) Dan Wheldon	NC	
(United States) Rahal Letterman Racing	Dallara	Honda	F	16	(United Kingdom) Alex Lloyd R	5	
(United States) Rahal Letterman Racing	Dallara	Honda	F	17	(United States) Ryan Hunter-Reay	1-2, 3A, 4-17, NC	
(Canada) Roth Racing	Dallara	Honda	F	24	(United Kingdom) Jay Howard R	1–2, 3A, 4-5, 10	
(Canada) Roth Racing	Dallara	Honda	F	24	(United States) John Andretti	5–9	
(Canada) Roth Racing	Dallara	Honda	F	25	(Canada) Marty Roth	1-2, 3A, 4–9, 11–17	
(Canada) Rubicon Race Team	Dallara	Honda	F	44	(Italy) Max Papis	5	
(United States) Sarah Fisher Racing	Dallara	Honda	F	67	(United States) Sarah Fisher	5, 14, 17	
(United States) Team Penske	Dallara	Honda	F	3	(Brazil) Hélio Castroneves	1-2, 3A, 4-17, NC	
(United States) Team Penske	Dallara	Honda	F	6	(Australia) Ryan Briscoe	1-2, 3A, 4-17, NC	
(United States) Vision Racing	Dallara	Honda	F	2	(United States) A. J. Foyt IV	1-2, 3A, 4-17, NC	
(United States) Vision Racing	Dallara	Honda	F	20	(United States) Ed Carpenter	1-2, 3A, 4-17, NC	
(United States) Vision Racing	Dallara	Honda	F	22	(United States) Davey Hamilton	5	
(United States) Vision Racing	Dallara	Honda	F	22	(Canada) Paul Tracy	13	
Long Beach only entries
(United States) Forsythe/Pettit Racing	Panoz DP01	Cosworth	B	3	(Canada) Paul Tracy	3B	
(United States) Forsythe/Pettit Racing	Panoz DP01	Cosworth	B	7	(France) Franck Montagny R	3B	
(United States) Forsythe/Pettit Racing	Panoz DP01	Cosworth	B	37	(Mexico) David Martínez R	3B	
(United States) KV Racing Technology	Panoz DP01	Cosworth	B	12	(United States) Jimmy Vasser	3B	
(United States) Minardi–HVM Racing	Panoz DP01	Cosworth	B	4	(France) Nelson Philippe R	3B	
(United States) Minardi–HVM Racing	Panoz DP01	Cosworth	B	14	(Brazil) Roberto Moreno	3B	
(United States) Pacific Coast Motorsports	Panoz DP01	Cosworth	B	29	(United States) Alex Figge R	3B	
(United States) Rocketsports	Panoz DP01	Cosworth	B	9	(Brazil) Antônio Pizzonia R	3B	
(United States) Rocketsports	Panoz DP01	Cosworth	B	10	(Finland) Juho Annala R	3B	
(United Kingdom) Walker Racing	Panoz DP01	Cosworth	B	15	(Canada) Alex Tagliani	3B	

R Eligible for Rookie of the Year

^{1} The former Champ Car teams that transitioned to the IndyCar Series competed at the Grand Prix of Long Beach (round 3) instead of the Indy Japan 300 at Motegi, contested under Champ Car rules with the cars, engines and tires from the series.

=== Driver changes ===
==== Preseason ====
- On October 3, 2007, reigning IndyCar champion and Indianapolis 500 winner Dario Franchitti announced he would depart Andretti Green Racing to drive in the NASCAR Sprint Cup Series with Chip Ganassi Racing. On October 31, AGR announced rookie Hideki Mutoh would take his place in the No. 27 car. Honda-backed Mutoh switched from the Indy Pro Series, where he finished second in the standings with two wins.
- On November 8, 2007, Team Penske announced that Sam Hornish Jr. would move to Penske Racing to embark on a full-time NASCAR Sprint Cup Series effort, effectively leaving the IndyCar Series after eight seasons. On November 13, Penske announced Ryan Briscoe as the new driver of the No. 6 car, returning to a full-time IndyCar seat after two seasons of part-time drives. Briscoe switched from Penske's LMP2 operation in the American Le Mans Series, where he scored two overall wins, and his Indianapolis 500 effort with Luczo Dragon Racing for 2007 was run on leased Penske equipment.
- On November 26, 2007, Roth Racing formalized its plans to expand to a full-time, two-car team. Team owner Marty Roth would return at the wheel of the No. 25 car, while the new No. 24 would be driven by rookie Jay Howard, who had competed in three Indy Pro Series starts that year after winning the championship in 2006.
- On December 18, 2007, A. J. Foyt Racing announced it had executed its option for a one-year contract extension with Darren Manning to remain as the driver of the No. 14 car.
- On January 23, 2008, Scott Sharp formally announced he would leave Rahal Letterman Racing to race in the American Le Mans Series with Highcroft Racing. The announcement was made in the midst of a legal fight between Sharp and the Rahal team, with both sides accusing each other of contract breaches since December 2007. RLR was denied a preliminary injunction to prevent Sharp from competing elsewhere, although the ruling admitted a breach of contract on Sharp's side. The dispute ended in an out-of-court settlement on March 15. Sharp was not replaced, as RLR downsized to a one-car entry due to a lack of sponsorship.
- In February 2008, Panther Racing decided to field a single car for the season, with former driver Kosuke Matsuura switching to Formula Nippon. The team had previously held talks with P. J. Chesson and Dan Clarke to drive a second car.
- On February 15, 2008, Luczo-Dragon Racing confirmed Tomas Scheckter as the new driver of the No. 12, previously occupied by Penske's Ryan Briscoe. Having switched from Vision Racing, Scheckter's initial deal was for three races, being scheduled to compete at Kansas, the Indianapolis 500 and Sonoma.
- At the time the unification of open-wheel racing was announced on February 22, 2008, seven drivers from six different teams had been named to rides for the upcoming Champ Car season. Four of them would compete as announced to that date: Justin Wilson and Graham Rahal with Newman/Haas/Lanigan Racing, Oriol Servià for KV Racing Technology, and Franck Perera for Conquest Racing. On the other hand, Paul Tracy and Enrique Bernoldi became free agents after Forsythe and Rocketsports decided against joining the unified series, and Alex Figge forfeited his deal with Pacific Coast Motorsports due to the prevalence of oval racing.
- On February 25, 2008, Rahal Letterman Racing named Ryan Hunter-Reay as the full-time driver of the No. 17 car, which he drove in the last six races of 2007.
- On February 25, 2008, Dreyer & Reinbold Racing announced a deal with Milka Duno to compete at "selected events" in the No. 23 car, being designated for the season opener at Homestead. Duno had a similar schedule in her rookie season at SAMAX Motorsport and effectively replaced Sarah Fisher in the team. On March 6, the team announced Duno would have an 11-race program in a shared drive with Townsend Bell, who would compete at the remaining six races. Bell was also confirmed for the Indianapolis 500 in a third car, and would drive the No. 23 at the non-points event in Surfers Paradise.
- On February 26, 2008, Vision Racing confirmed a two-car programme for the 2008 season with returning drivers A. J. Foyt IV and Ed Carpenter, downsizing from three entries after the departure of Tomas Scheckter.
- On February 27, 2008, Sarah Fisher announced she would take part in the Indianapolis 500 with her brand new team, Sarah Fisher Racing, and the possibility of competing in further events. Fisher's transition to driver-owner had been in the works since August 2007, before the end of her full-time drive with Dreyer & Reinbold.
- On March 4, 2008, Rubicon Race Team announced Max Papis as the driver of the one-off entry for the Indianapolis 500. This was Papis' third attempt to compete in the race, after taking part in 2002 and 2006.
- On March 7, 2008, Beck Motorsports announced it would compete at Motegi with Japanese American driver Roger Yasukawa, in his first race outside of the Indianapolis 500 since 2005.
- On March 12, 2008, KV Racing Technology announced Will Power as the new driver of the No. 8 car in partnership with Team Australia, with both the sponsorship deal and the driver switching from Walker Racing. Power teamed up with the already announced Oriol Servià. KV Racing had tested with Alex Tagliani prior to the unification.
- On March 18, 2008, Conquest Racing announced Enrique Bernoldi as the driver of the No. 36 car, partnering Franck Perera. Bernoldi had previously been announced by Rocketsports Racing for its Champ Car effort, but became a free agent after the team declined to join the unified series. Before the unification, Conquest had tested with Simon Pagenaud, who went on to compete in the American Le Mans Series and would not return to IndyCar until 2011.
- On March 19, 2008, Dale Coyne Racing announced Bruno Junqueira and rookie Mario Moraes as their drivers for the 2008 season, after both drivers tested with the team in the winter. Junqueira remained in the No. 18 after registering the best ever season in Champ Car for a Coyne driver, while Moraes took the No. 19 formerly driven by Katherine Legge, who left the series in February to race for Audi in the Deutsche Tourenwagen Masters. Moraes switched from British Formula 3, where he finished 14th with a best result of fifth.
- On March 24, 2008, HVM Racing announced E. J. Viso as the driver of the No. 33 car, its lone full-time entry in IndyCar. Viso, who had taken part in pre-season Champ Car testing with the team under the former Minardi Team USA branding, switched from a partial season in the GP2 Series, where he finished 6th in 2006.

==== Mid-season ====
- On March 25, Graham Rahal crashed during the last day of a two-day test at Homestead–Miami Speedway, just prior to the season opener. Although Rahal was uninjured, Newman/Haas/Lanigan Racing did not have a spare car, nor enough spare parts to repair the damaged chassis in time, and were forced to withdraw the No. 06 car a day before official practice.
- All nine teams that intended to participate in the 2008 Champ Car season, regardless of their transition status, competed in the Grand Prix of Long Beach, run as a special "Champ Car finale" round. Beyond the nine entries registered for the full IndyCar season, a 20-car field was assembled:
  - On April 1, KV Racing Technology announced it would field a third car for co-owner Jimmy Vasser, two years after his last start at the same track.
  - On April 1, Forsythe/Pettit Racing announced David Martínez as the first driver of a planned three-car entry, with Martínez having raced sporadically with Forsythe in 2006 and 2007. On April 7, the team entered Paul Tracy, who declared it would be his final race at Forsythe, and Franck Montagny, who had tested with the team during the winter.
  - On April 7, Pacific Coast Motorsports entered Alex Figge, who would leave the team after the race to compete in the American Le Mans Series. On April 17, a second car was added for Mario Domínguez, who was in the final stages of securing a full-time deal.
  - On April 8, Rocketsports Racing announced a two-car entry for Antônio Pizzonia, who had competed in four Champ Car races with the team in 2006, and rookie Juho Annala, who had finished 11th in the International Formula Master standings with one podium finish.
  - On April 10, HVM Racing announced Nelson Philippe and Roberto Moreno would complete their three-car team, with both cars running under the Minardi–HVM Racing branding. Philippe had driven for the team with great success in 2006, while Moreno had done so in 2003 during the Herdez Competition era.
  - On April 11, Walker Racing announced it would enter one car, instead of the expected two, for Alex Tagliani, who had previously raced with the team in 2005 and 2006 under the Team Australia banner.
- On April 8, Rahal Letterman Racing announced rookie Alex Lloyd in the No. 16 car for the Indianapolis 500, in association with Chip Ganassi Racing. Lloyd was the reigning Indy Pro Series champion with eight wins in 15 starts, and signed with Ganassi as a development driver in October 2007.
- On April 15, Davey Hamilton announced he would race at the Indianapolis 500 with funding from Kingdom Racing, a 501(c)(3) organization who was tasked with "selecting (a) race platform" for Hamilton. On May 2, a deal was announced with Vision Racing to run the No. 22 car as their third entry.
- On April 23, Pacific Coast Motorsports announced Mario Domínguez as the new full time driver of the No. 96 car for an IndyCar program, starting at the Indianapolis 500.
- On April 24, Conquest Racing announced that Franck Perera was to be replaced with rookie Jaime Camara with immediate effect from the Kansas race onwards after the collapse of Opes Prime, the main sponsor for Perera's effort. Camara stepped up after three seasons in the Indy Pro Series with three wins overall, having finished fifth in 2005 and sixth in both 2006 and 2007.
- On April 30, Hemelgarn Racing announced the return of longtime driver Buddy Lazier for the Indianapolis 500. Lazier won the 1996 Indianapolis 500 in the No. 91 car, which he drove in the race until 2004.
- On May 3, newly renamed American Dream Motorsports announced that Phil Giebler would drive the No. 88 Panoz at the Indianapolis 500, this being the only Panoz GF09C entered in the race, and the last to be entered in an IndyCar event.
- On May 10, during Pole Day for the Indianapolis 500, Roth Racing assigned John Andretti to the No. 24 car in place of Jay Howard. The team justified the move for a more experienced driver on the loss of their chief engineer and the days of practice lost to rain.
- On May 12, A. J. Foyt Racing announced Jeff Simmons as the driver of the No. 41 car for the Indianapolis 500. Previously, team director Larry Foyt had been provisionally entered in the car, but A. J. Foyt manifested he had no intention of letting his son drive due to his responsibilities in the team.
- On May 14, Beck Motorsports assigned their No. 98 entry in the Indianapolis 500 to Roger Yasukawa, in his second drive of the season for the team. Yasukawa beat fellow veterans Jaques Lazier and Alex Barron, who had been on the team's shortlist.
- On May 30, Roth Racing announced that John Andretti would remain at the wheel of the No. 24 car for the Texas and Milwaukee events, with a view on retaining him for the rest of the season. On June 17, Andretti was entered again at Iowa, and he remained in the car for the following round at Richmond. On July 1, it was announced that Jay Howard would return to the No. 24 at Watkins Glen. A lack of sponsorship forced Marty Roth to withdraw its entry from the event, and the team eventually parked the No. 24 for the rest of the season, racing as a one-car operation.
- On May 31, Luczo Dragon Racing announced an expansion of the No. 12 car programme with Tomas Scheckter to race at the upcoming Texas race and at the Chicagoland finale. On August 25, the Detroit race was added to Scheckter's schedule for a total of six races in 2008.
- On June 19, Pacific Coast Motorsports announced it would not compete at Iowa in order to re-evaluate its cash-strapped program. The team went on to skip all oval events, concentrating on the road courses. After the Sonoma race on August 27, Pacific Coast announced it would be their final appearance of the season, also skipping the Detroit Grand Prix.
- On July 9, HVM Racing announced its withdrawal from the Nashville event as a precautionary measure, after E. J. Viso was diagnosed with the mumps disease.
- On July 15, Vision Racing announced a deal with Paul Tracy to enter the No. 22 car at Edmonton, honoring a previous offer made by team owner Tony George. The car was entered in association with Walker Racing, which would provide the crew and maintenance for the car.
- On July 17, Sarah Fisher Racing and driver Sarah Fisher announced they would compete at Kentucky and at the final race of the season at Chicagoland, formalizing a three-race program overall for the first-year team.
- On August 30, Enrique Bernoldi withdrew from the Detroit Grand Prix after practice due to pain from a thumb injury sustained the week prior at Sonoma. He was replaced at Conquest Racing by veteran Champ Car driver Alex Tagliani, making his first start in the series. Slow healing on Bernoldi's thumb meant that Tagliani was kept for the Chicagoland finale, being also confirmed for the Surfers Paradise non-championship event due to his experience on the track.
- On September 3, A. J. Foyt Racing entered a second car for the Chicagoland finale, naming former Conquest driver Franck Perera at the wheel of the No. 41 Dallara.

==== Post-season - Surfers Paradise ====
- After the three-way team switch between Dario Franchitti, Dan Wheldon and Vítor Meira took place in September, all drivers were tasked with an early debut at the Surfers Paradise non-championship event. On September 19, Chip Ganassi Racing announced Franchitti would race the No. 10 in Australia, giving an early release to Wheldon, who was announced in the same capacity by Panther Racing on September 23. Two days later, A. J. Foyt Racing announced the signing of Meira and his early debut in Australia in place of Darren Manning.
- Roth Racing was put on sale after the end of the season, and did not make the trip to Australia, after Marty Roth was told by the series he would only be approved as a driver in selected events for 2009.

=== Team changes ===
==== Preseason ====
- Part-time teams SAMAX Motorsport and Racing Professionals did not compete in the 2008 IndyCar season. Their equipment was sold back to the IndyCar Series, which used it as part of the 'pool of cars' and parts for Champ Car teams.
- On January 21, 2008, experienced team manager Jim Freudenberg and actor Jason Priestley announced the formation of Rubicon Race Team to compete in the Indianapolis 500. The one-car entry would be prepared and maintained by Sam Schmidt Motorsports as their only effort for the race.
- After the unification of open-wheel racing was announced on February 22, 2008, seven of the nine Champ Car teams made announcements in regards to their status in the unified series.
  - On February 20, 2008, before the unification was announced, team owner Paul Gentilozzi stated that Rocketsports Racing would not join the IndyCar Series due to financial issues and a lack of oval racing interest from their announced driver Enrique Bernoldi. No official statement was made in the following weeks, although officials from Rocketsports attended an orientation meeting for prospective new teams. On April 8, it was announced that Rocketsports would not compete in the IndyCar Series following the Grand Prix of Long Beach.
  - On February 22, 2008, Walker Racing announced it would be part of the unified series, in a statement that did not include the Team Australia branding entered by Walker between 2005 and 2007. A separate statement from Team Australia did not mention Walker Racing as well, as their "final make-up and structure" was to be determined, but did include Will Power, who had not been yet confirmed for the 2008 season despite having a year left in his contract.
  - On February 23, 2008, Pacific Coast Motorsports announced their intention to continue in the IndyCar Series through their team director Tyler Tadevic with a two-car entry, with Alex Figge as the lone confirmed driver at the time. However, the team did not formalize their program in the coming weeks, later announcing its availability for any racing project in late March, and was missing from the first two races.
  - On February 25, 2008, Conquest Racing announced it would continue its plans for a two-car entry in the unified series. Conquest had previously competed in the Indy Racing League in 2002 before entering CART the following year. On March 12, the team signed a technical partnership with Forsythe Performance Research, a subsidiary of former rivals Forsythe Championship Racing.
  - On February 27, 2008, Newman/Haas/Lanigan Racing announced it would continue its plans for a two-car entry in the unified series. Newman/Haas had raced in the 2004 and 2005 editions of the Indianapolis 500 during the split.
  - On February 27, 2008, during the official press conference on the unification, team owner Kevin Kalkhoven announced that PKV Racing would compete in the IndyCar Series, with the team being renamed as KV Racing Technology due to the departure of Dan Pettit as co-owner.
  - On February 28, 2008, Forsythe/Pettit Racing announced the cessation of their racing operations due to a lack of sponsorship. The team committed to participate in the Champ Car finale at Long Beach with a three-car entry through Forsythe Racing, their parent outfit in the Atlantic Championship, which would continue to operate. Various media outlets pointed to team owner Jerry Forsythe's antipathy towards Tony George as the true reason behind the closure, as he had funded his own team out of pocket since 2004, as well as other teams in Champ Car as co-owner of the series. Contracted driver Paul Tracy alleged that Forsythe's decision made him a free agent and implied a termination of his multi-year deal with the team, which he would eventually sue in October for $2.3 million due to a breach of contract.
  - Minardi Team USA and Dale Coyne Racing made no statement regarding their status in the days following the unification, but their participation in the series was expected. Both teams were paired to existing IndyCar teams as part of the efforts to accommodate the new structures.
- On March 9, 2008, Walker Racing announced the withdrawal of their expected IndyCar program after the Grand Prix of Long Beach due to a lack of funding, as Team Australia decided to transfer their partnership to KV Racing Technology. On March 21, team owner Derrick Walker announced he would take legal action against Team Australia's founder Craig Gore over "a serious default of his contractual commitments and fiduciary obligations", claiming Gore owed $1,5 million and had misled the team on their 2008 plans. Gore responded with a lengthy statement denying Walker's accusations and criticizing him over "unacceptable budgets", "numerous (account) anomalies" and an attempt on a unilateral signing of Will Power without their knowledge, among other issues.
- On March 12, 2008, team owner Keith Wiggins announced that Minardi Team USA would revert to his former identity as HVM Racing and compete in the IndyCar Series with one car instead of two. He also announced a three-car entry for the Long Beach race. The announcement was made hours after Paul Stoddart formally withdrew his ownership and the Minardi-branded backing due to the expected lack of competitiveness of Champ Car teams.
- On March 19, 2008, Dale Coyne Racing formally announced their participation in the 2008 season with a two-car programme.

==== Mid-season ====
- On April 11, Playa Del Racing appeared in the entry list for the Indianapolis 500, with no driver assigned. On May 3, the team announced it had been bought by businessmen William T. Kelsey and Eric Zimmerman, the former owner of the defunct Zali Racing that competed in the Indy Racing League in 2001. As a result, the team was renamed as American Dream Motorsports. However, they were unable to secure an engine deal until May 15, severely limiting their running. After the team failed to qualify for the Indy 500 due to a crash in practice, Zimmerman announced American Dream would enter the Texas event and other races with Jaques Lazier, but the team never arrived. Shortly after, Zimmerman was imprisoned due to a warrant arrest from the state of Nevada over a money scam on high school students, and the Indy Lights team was disbanded during the weekend of the Milwaukee event.
- On April 23, Pacific Coast Motorsports announced it would compete in IndyCar with a one-car program, starting at the Indianapolis 500. The team was now owned by former director Tyler Tadevic, who mortgaged his house to raise the necessary finances. In the hours following the unification agreement, former owner Tom Figge had initially decided to close Pacific Coast Motorsports, feeling betrayed by Kevin Kalkhoven over the large expenditures made as a new team in 2007, and because of the disinterest from both him and his son Alex Figge to compete in oval racing.

== Schedule ==
The original 16-race schedule was released on September 19, 2007. After the unification with Champ Car, the schedule was eventually expanded to 18 races, plus a non-championship event.

Icon	Legend
O	Oval/Speedway
R	Road course
S	Street circuit
NC	Non-championship race

Rnd		Date	Race Name	Track	Location
1		March 29	XM Indy 300 at Homestead-Miami	O Homestead-Miami Speedway	(United States) Homestead, Florida
2		April 6	Honda IndyCar Grand Prix at St. Petersburg	S Streets of St. Petersburg	(United States) St. Petersburg, Florida
3	A	April 20^{†}	Indy Japan 300 (see below)	O Twin Ring Motegi	(Japan) Motegi, Tochigi
3	B	April 20	Toyota Grand Prix of Long Beach (see below)	S Streets of Long Beach	(United States) Long Beach, California
4		April 27	RoadRunner Turbo Indy 300	O Kansas Speedway	(United States) Kansas City, Kansas
5		May 25	92nd Indianapolis 500	O Indianapolis Motor Speedway	(United States) Speedway, Indiana
6		June 1	ABC Supply Company A. J. Foyt 225	O The Milwaukee Mile	(United States) West Allis, Wisconsin
7		June 7	Bombardier Learjet IndyCar 550k at Texas	O Texas Motor Speedway	(United States) Fort Worth, Texas
8		June 22	Ethanol IndyCar 250 at Iowa	O Iowa Speedway	(United States) Newton, Iowa
9		June 28	SunTrust Indy Challenge	O Richmond International Raceway	(United States) Richmond, Virginia
10		July 6	Camping World IndyCar Grand Prix at The Glen	R Watkins Glen International	(United States) Watkins Glen, New York
11		July 12	Firestone IndyCar 200 at Nashville	O Nashville Superspeedway	(United States) Lebanon, Tennessee
12		July 20	Honda IndyCar Grand Prix at Mid-Ohio	R Mid-Ohio Sports Car Course	(United States) Lexington, Ohio
13		July 26	Rexall Edmonton Indy	R Edmonton City Centre Airport Speedway	(Canada) Edmonton, Alberta
14		August 9	Meijer Indy 300	O Kentucky Speedway	(United States) Sparta, Kentucky
15		August 24	Peak Antifreeze & Motor Oil Indy Grand Prix of Sonoma County	R Infineon Raceway	(United States) Sonoma, California
16		August 31	Detroit Indy Grand Prix	S The Raceway on Belle Isle Park	(United States) Detroit, Michigan
17		September 7	Peak Antifreeze & Motor Oil Indy 300	O Chicagoland Speedway	(United States) Joliet, Illinois
NC		October 26	Nikon Indy 300	S Surfers Paradise Street Circuit	(Australia) Surfers Paradise, Queensland

^{†} – The Indy Japan 300 was originally scheduled for April 19, but was postponed to the next day due to multiple weepers on the track.

=== Schedule changes ===
- On May 1, 2007, the Honda Grand Prix of St. Petersburg announced a two-year extension, with the race set to run through at least 2013.
- On July 17, 2007, Michigan International Speedway announced it would not host an IndyCar race in 2008, being the first time the track did not held an open-wheel race on its schedule since its inception in 1968. A lack of a workable date after the change for 2007 and low attendance were postulated as the reasons behind the race being discontinued.
- On August 16, 2007, the race at Iowa Speedway was renewed for two years, with a contract through 2009.
- On August 28, 2007, Texas Motor Speedway signed a two-year contract extension through 2009.
- On September 2, 2007, IndyCar announced a one-year extension with Detroit to race in 2008, along with ALMS.
- On September 16, 2007, IndyCar released the 2008 schedule; 16 of the 17 races on the 2007 calendar were featured, with the exception of the discontinued Michigan race. All events would be held in the same order, with some minor date changes.
- On February 27, 2008, the Grand Prix of Long Beach was added to the schedule as part of the unification agreement with Champ Car. The race was scheduled on the same weekend as the Indy Japan 300 at Motegi, and neither event could be rescheduled. Therefore, existing IndyCar teams competed in the Indy Japan 300, while the former Champ Car teams raced at Long Beach using their 2007 Panoz DP01 chassis, with both races counted toward the 2008 title. It was also announced that discussions were proceeding to incorporate the Champ Car races at Edmonton and Surfers Paradise in the 2008 schedule.
- On March 5, 2008, officials from the Gold Coast Indy 300 announced the signing of a six-year deal to host an IndyCar race through 2013. However, the race would remain unconfirmed on IndyCar's calendar in the months that followed.
- On April 14, 2008, IndyCar announced a deal to race at the Edmonton Indy, which was moved to July 26 as its original July 20 date was taken by Mid-Ohio. The race was held on a Saturday to avoid clashing with the NASCAR Allstate 400 at the Brickyard; the Indianapolis Motor Speedway had an agreement not to hold IndyCar races directly against the NASCAR race at their circuit.
- On July 29, 2008, IndyCar announced a deal to race at Surfers Paradise on its scheduled October 26 date. The event would be held as a non-championship race due to Chicagoland being contractually entitled to host the season finale. Despite this, the race was not added to the 2009 schedule, which was published one day later.

== Testing ==
Some of the new technical changes for 2008 were tried in a post-season Open Test on October 12, 2007, at Barber Motorsports Park, which held an IndyCar test for the first time with seven drivers from Andretti Green, Ganassi, Penske and Panther. The test was led by Tony Kanaan with a best time of 1:09.743. In December 2007, six drivers took part in a Firestone tire test at Homestead–Miami Speedway, while Scott Dixon and Ryan Hunter-Reay took part in a series test the following day to evaluate potential layout changes at Infineon Raceway.

Testing resumed on February 27–28 in night conditions at Homestead, in the wake of the unification agreement. with 16 drivers in attendance from carryover IndyCar teams. Dan Wheldon set the fastest time overall in the first day at 213.312 mph, while Danica Patrick led the second day with a best speed of 213.182 mph after sitting the first day with flu-like symptoms.

On March, IndyCar conducted its first two Open Tests ever at Sebring International Raceway, a popular venue for Champ Car testing. 18 drivers from carryover IndyCar teams split test days between March 3–6, with Tony Kanaan leading the first two days and Ryan Briscoe setting the pace in the last two with a best lap time of 52.4206. Jay Howard, who missed the Homestead test due to not having the approval for oval racing at the time, took part in the first two days, while Townsend Bell made his debut with Dreyer & Reinbold on the final day, taking over from Milka Duno.

The five transitioning Champ Car teams were scheduled to test on March 19–20, but only six drivers took part as Newman/Haas/Lanigan and HVM Racing were not ready in time. KV Racing Technology set the pace on both days with Will Power and Oriol Servià, whose best time of 52.7035 was only bettered two weeks earlier by both Penske drivers, with the help of additional rubber from previous week's 12 Hours of Sebring. Newman/Haas and HVM's test time was reallocated to April 1 during an Indy Lights test, but rain restricted running to 45 laps overall between both teams.

During the week of the season opener at Homestead–Miami Speedway, a special Open Test was arranged on March 24–25, with 11 drivers from the five transitioning Champ Car teams and for Roth Racing, who led both days of testing with Marty Roth with a best lap of 212.816 mph. KV Racing Technology was again the fastest among Champ Car teams on their first oval experience in the Dallara IR05. As a result, speeds were expectedly sluggish compared to most of the IndyCar-based teams, with Oriol Servià setting a best lap of 210.176 mph among convert teams. A crash by Graham Rahal on Day 2 sidelined him from the race weekend due to a lack of parts.

== Results ==
NC Non-championship race

Rd.		Race	Pole position	Fastest lap	Most laps led	Race winner		Report
Rd.		Race	Pole position	Fastest lap	Most laps led	Driver	Team	Report
1		Homestead	(New Zealand) Scott Dixon	(Australia) Ryan Briscoe	(United States) Marco Andretti	(New Zealand) Scott Dixon	(United States) Chip Ganassi Racing	Report
2		St. Petersburg	(Brazil) Tony Kanaan	(Brazil) Tony Kanaan	(United States) Graham Rahal	(United States) Graham Rahal	(United States) Newman/Haas/Lanigan Racing	Report
3	A	Motegi	(Brazil) Hélio Castroneves	(Brazil) Hélio Castroneves	(New Zealand) Scott Dixon	(United States) Danica Patrick	(United States) Andretti Green Racing	Report
3	B	Long Beach	(United Kingdom) Justin Wilson	(Brazil) Antônio Pizzonia	(Australia) Will Power	(Australia) Will Power	(United States) KV Racing	Report
4		Kansas	(New Zealand) Scott Dixon	(New Zealand) Scott Dixon	(New Zealand) Scott Dixon	(United Kingdom) Dan Wheldon	(United States) Chip Ganassi Racing	Report
5		Indianapolis	(New Zealand) Scott Dixon	(United States) Marco Andretti	(New Zealand) Scott Dixon	(New Zealand) Scott Dixon	(United States) Chip Ganassi Racing	Report
6		Milwaukee	(United States) Marco Andretti	(New Zealand) Scott Dixon	(New Zealand) Scott Dixon	(Australia) Ryan Briscoe	(United States) Team Penske	Report
7		Texas	(New Zealand) Scott Dixon	(United Kingdom) Dan Wheldon	(Brazil) Hélio Castroneves	(New Zealand) Scott Dixon	(United States) Chip Ganassi Racing	Report
8		Iowa	(New Zealand) Scott Dixon	(Australia) Ryan Briscoe	(Brazil) Hélio Castroneves	(United Kingdom) Dan Wheldon	(United States) Chip Ganassi Racing	Report
9		Richmond	(Brazil) Tony Kanaan	(Brazil) Tony Kanaan	(Brazil) Tony Kanaan	(Brazil) Tony Kanaan	(United States) Andretti Green Racing	Report
10		Watkins Glen	(Australia) Ryan Briscoe	(Australia) Ryan Briscoe	(Australia) Ryan Briscoe	(United States) Ryan Hunter-Reay	(United States) Rahal Letterman Racing	Report
11		Nashville	(Brazil) Hélio Castroneves	(Brazil) Tony Kanaan	(Brazil) Tony Kanaan	(New Zealand) Scott Dixon	(United States) Chip Ganassi Racing	Report
12		Mid-Ohio	(Brazil) Hélio Castroneves	(Australia) Ryan Briscoe	(Australia) Ryan Briscoe	(Australia) Ryan Briscoe	(United States) Team Penske	Report
13		Edmonton	(Australia) Ryan Briscoe	(Australia) Will Power	(Brazil) Hélio Castroneves	(New Zealand) Scott Dixon	(United States) Chip Ganassi Racing	Report
14		Kentucky	(New Zealand) Scott Dixon	(United States) Ed Carpenter	(New Zealand) Scott Dixon	(New Zealand) Scott Dixon	(United States) Chip Ganassi Racing	Report
15		Sonoma	(Brazil) Hélio Castroneves	(Brazil) Hélio Castroneves	(Brazil) Hélio Castroneves	(Brazil) Hélio Castroneves	(United States) Team Penske	Report
16		Detroit	(New Zealand) Scott Dixon	(United Kingdom) Justin Wilson	(Brazil) Hélio Castroneves	(United Kingdom) Justin Wilson	(United States) Newman/Haas/Lanigan Racing	Report
17		Chicagoland	(Australia) Ryan Briscoe	(Brazil) Hélio Castroneves	(Brazil) Hélio Castroneves	(Brazil) Hélio Castroneves	(United States) Team Penske	Report
NC		Surfers Paradise	(Australia) Will Power	(United Kingdom) Dario Franchitti	(Australia) Ryan Briscoe	(Australia) Ryan Briscoe	(United States) Team Penske	Report

== Race summaries ==
=== Round 1: GAINSCO Auto Insurance Indy 300 ===
- Saturday March 29, 2008 – 8:00 p.m. EDT
- Homestead-Miami Speedway – Homestead, Florida (1.485 mile oval)
- Distance: 200 laps / 297 miles (478 km)
- Race weather: 78 °F (26 °C), Fair skies
- Television: ESPN2 (Marty Reid, Scott Goodyear, Jack Arute, Vince Welch, Brienne Pedigo)
- Nielsen ratings: 0.8 rating and 815,070 households
- Attendance: 40,000 (estimated)
- Pole position winner: No. 9 Scott Dixon, 213.341 mph (343.339 km/h)

After qualifying, the Vision Racing qualifying times of Ed Carpenter and A. J. Foyt IV (2nd and 3rd) were disallowed, and forced to move to the rear of the field. After a crash during qualifying, Dan Wheldon was forced to a back-up car at the rear of the field as well.

At the start, Scott Dixon beat Danica Patrick into the first turn. Dixon went on to lead most of the way through lap 71. After a series of pit stops, Marco Andretti moved into the lead. On lap 127, Milka Duno spun in turn two, and collected Ryan Briscoe, who was running sixth. Later, Tony Kanaan moved back into the lead until the final round of pit stops. By pitting out-of-sequence Danica Patrick unlapped herself, and moved up to second place. The position was short-lived, as she was forced to pit for fuel before the end of the race. With seven laps to go, E. J. Viso spun directly in front the leader Kanaan, and clipped his right-front suspension. Kanaan attempted to limp around and hold on to the victory if the race finished under caution. With four laps to go, the green came out, and Kanaan was forced to pull out of the way. Scott Dixon got by, and held on for the victory.

Despite starting at the rear of the field, Dan Wheldon charged to the front, managed to lead 9 laps, and came home third. In addition, both Vision cars rebounded to finish in the top 10.

2008 was the last season that the series season opener held in an oval track to date until 2020.

Top five finishers
Fin. Pos	St. Pos	Car No.	Driver	Team	Laps	Time	Laps Led
1	1	9	(New Zealand) Scott Dixon	Chip Ganassi Racing	200	1:44:03.5914	67
2	4	26	(United States) Marco Andretti	Andretti Green Racing	200	+0.5828	85
3	22	10	(United Kingdom) Dan Wheldon	Chip Ganassi Racing	200	+1.4278	9
4	5	3	(Brazil) Hélio Castroneves	Penske Racing	200	+8.0340	4
5	24	20	(United States) Ed Carpenter	Vision Racing	199	+1 lap	0
Race average speed: 171.248 mph (275.597 km/h)
Lead changes: 12 between 5 drivers
Cautions: 3 for 24 laps

=== Round 2: Honda Grand Prix of St. Petersburg ===
- Sunday April 6, 2008 – 2:30 p.m. EDT
- Streets of St. Petersburg – St. Petersburg, Florida (1.8-mile temporary street course)
- Distance: 100 laps / 180 miles (290 km) (shortened to 83 laps / 149.4 miles (240.4 km) due to 2-hour time limit)
- Race weather: 78 °F (26 °C), rain & clouds
- Television: ESPN (Marty Reid, Scott Goodyear, Jack Arute, Vince Welch, Brienne Pedigo)
- Nielsen ratings: 0.42
- Attendance: 45,000 (race day)
- Pole position winner: No. 11 Tony Kanaan – 1:02.5322 sec, 103.627 mph (166.771 km/h)

Heavy rain in the morning soaked the track, and left considerable standing water. The race was started under 10 laps of caution as the track dried. At the start, Tony Kanaan assumed the lead, but soon was passed by Justin Wilson. The early part of the race saw several spins by several cars, including Danica Patrick, Marco Andretti and Mario Moraes.

On the 37th lap after a restart, rookie Graham Rahal was hit from behind by Will Power while running 3rd. He was able to continue. Several cautions slowed the race, including a crash by Ryan Briscoe, and a multi-car incident involving Vítor Meira, Franck Perera, and Townsend Bell. On the restart that followed, Rahal-Letterman Racing driver Ryan Hunter-Reay led Graham Rahal. Rahal got the jump and took the lead into the first turn. With time running out before the two-hout time limit, the race was poised to end before the scheduled distance. On the final restart, just under 4 minutes of racing remained. Rahal held off a charging Hélio Castroneves and won his first race.

At 19 years, 93 days old, Rahal became the youngest driver ever to win an Indy-style race, as well as the youngest winner in IndyCar Series history. He broke Marco Andretti's record from 2006. He also became the fourth driver to win an IndyCar Series race in his first start, joining Buzz Calkins, Juan Pablo Montoya and Scott Dixon.

Top five finishers
Fin. Pos	St. Pos	Car No.	Driver	Team	Laps	Time	Laps Led
1	9	06	(United States) Graham Rahal	Newman/Haas/Lanigan Racing	83	2:00:43.5562	19
2	4	3	(Brazil) Hélio Castroneves	Penske Racing	83	+3.5192	0
3	1	11	(Brazil) Tony Kanaan	Andretti Green Racing	83	+5.5134	15
4	15	33	(Venezuela) E. J. Viso	HVM Racing	83	+8.8575	12
5	18	36	(Brazil) Enrique Bernoldi	Conquest Racing	83	+9.6360	3
Race average speed: 74.251 mph (119.495 km/h)
Lead changes: 7 between 8 drivers
Cautions: 6 for 29 laps

=== Round 3A: Indy Japan 300 ===
- Sunday April 20–11:00 a.m. JST / Saturday April 19, 10,:00 p.m. EDT; postponed from Saturday April 19–1:00 p.m. JST / 12:00 a.m. EDT due to weepers (water seeping up onto the track from previous heavy rains).
- Twin Ring Motegi – Motegi, Japan (1.52-mile oval)
- Distance: 200 laps / 304 miles (489 km)
- Race weather: 54 °F (12 °C), Mostly cloudy
- Television: ESPN Classic, ESPN2 (Marty Reid, Scott Goodyear, Jack Arute 1)
- Nielsen ratings: 0.27 (rainout); 0.19 (live); 0.33 (re-air)
- Attendance: TBA
- Pole position winner: No. 3 Hélio Castroneves (qualifying rained out; lineup set by IndyCar points standings)

At the start, Marco Andretti lost control in turn one due to cold tires and crashed out of the race. Meanwhile, Hélio Castroneves took the lead, and led the first 92 laps. On the 48th lap, Ed Carpenter and Danica Patrick pitted, but moments later the caution came out when Hideki Mutoh crashed. The pits became closed, and the remainder of the leaders had to wait to make their respective pit stops. After the field was shuffled, Castroneves still maintained the lead.

On the 92nd lap, Vítor Meira brushed the wall. In the pits, Vision Racing teammates Carpenter and A. J. Foyt IV made contact in their pit stalls. Scott Dixon exited the pits first, and took over the lead.

On lap 142, Roger Yasukawa stalled on the mainstretch with a brake failure. The ensuing caution period set up an exciting finish due to fuel strategy, as most teams were getting 51 laps on a single tank of fuel. The top seven leaders all pitted together, with Dixon coming out in the lead once again. On lap 148, Castroneves, Patrick, and Carpenter all returned to the pits to top off their tanks, in hopes of going the distance without one last pit stop, hoping that the race would go green to the finish.

Shortly after the restart on lap 149, Patrick dropped back to seventh place (last car on the lead lap) in a fuel conservation strategy to have enough fuel to challenge the leader at the end of the race. With the race remaining green, during the final ten laps, most of the leaders, not having enough fuel to get to the end, ducked off the track for "splash-and-go" pit stops for fuel. Despite topping off his tank earlier, Ed Carpenter, getting poorer fuel economy than the rest of the lead-lap cars, was forced to pit for fuel. Castroneves inherited the lead with less than 5 laps to go, with Patrick charging in second place. Castroneves slowed his pace to conserve fuel, and Patrick took the lead with 2 laps to go. Patrick held on to win, and became the first female to win a race in the history of top-level American open wheel racing.

Top five finishers
Fin. Pos	St. Pos	Car No.	Driver	Team	Laps	Time	Laps Led
1	6	7	(United States) Danica Patrick	Andretti Green Racing	200	1:51:02.6739	3
2	1	3	(Brazil) Hélio Castroneves	Penske Racing	200	+5.8594	94
3	2	9	(New Zealand) Scott Dixon	Chip Ganassi Racing	200	+10.0559	101
4	5	10	(United Kingdom) Dan Wheldon	Chip Ganassi Racing	200	+13.1116	2
5	3	11	(Brazil) Tony Kanaan	Andretti Green Racing	200	+16.0731	0
Race average speed: 164.258 mph (264.348 km/h)
Lead changes: 5 between 4 drivers
Cautions: 4 for 29 laps

=== Round 3B: Toyota Grand Prix of Long Beach ===
- Sunday April 20–1:00 p.m. PDT / 4:00 p.m. EDT
- Streets of Long Beach – Long Beach, California (1.968-mile temporary street course)
- Distance: 1 Hour, 45 Minutes [83 laps, 163.34 miles (262.87 km)]. Race used former Champ Car rules which called for a time limit instead of laps run.
- Race weather: Sunny, 65 °F (18 °C)
- Television: ESPN2 (Marty Reid, Scott Goodyear, Jack Arute, Jamie Little, Brienne Pedigo)
- Nielsen ratings: 0.51
- Attendance: 75,000 (race day)
- Pole Position winner: No. 02 Justin Wilson, 1:06.902 sec, 105.898 mph (170.426 km/h)

The final race of the Champ Car era took place less than a day after the checkered flag fell at the Indy Japan 300. Teams which raced in ChampCars in 2007 stayed in North America for the 34th annual Long Beach Grand Prix, while teams which planned to compete in the IndyCar Series before the merger raced at Motegi.

The contingent of former Champ Car teams produced a 20-car field, all using the turbocharged Cosworth/Panoz DP01 for the final time. From a standing start (the first such at Long Beach since 1983; Champ Car had used the start from June 2007), Will Power got the jump from fourth position to take the lead into turn one. Power led 81 of the 83 laps, relinquishing the top position only during pit stops.

All participants entering other IndyCar races earned points towards the 2008 IndyCar Series championship. All the teams raced together again a week later at Kansas Speedway, and for the remainder of the schedule together.

The race was run under Champ Car rules, which included the standing start, option tire, two-day qualifying format, ran on time (1hr 45 mins) rather than a set number of laps.

Top five finishers
Fin. Pos	St. Pos	Car No.	Driver	Team	Laps	Time	Laps Led
1	4	8	(Australia) Will Power	KV Racing	83	1:45:25.415	81
2	6	7	(France) Franck Montagny	Forsythe/Pettit Racing	83	+5.094	0
3	10	96	(Mexico) Mario Domínguez	Pacific Coast Motorsports	83	+15.516	0
4	8	36	(Brazil) Enrique Bernoldi	Conquest Racing	83	+25.677	0
5	12	5	(Spain) Oriol Servia	KV Racing	83	+26.276	0
Race average speed: 92.964 mph (149.611 km/h)
Lead changes: 3 between 3 drivers
Cautions: 3 for 9 laps

=== Round 4: RoadRunner Turbo Indy 300 ===
- Sunday April 27–4:00 p.m. CDT / 5:00 p.m. EDT
- Kansas Speedway – Kansas City, Kansas (1.52 mile oval)
- Distance: 200 laps / 304 miles (489 km)
- Race weather: Mostly Sunny, 59 °F (15 °C)
- Television: ESPN2 (Marty Reid, Scott Goodyear, Jack Arute, Vince Welch, Brienne Pedigo)
- Nielsen ratings: 0.74
- Attendance: 70,000 (estimated)
- Pole Position winner: No. 9 Scott Dixon 213.496 mph (343.589 km/h)

At the start, Scott Dixon took the lead from the pole position. Meanwhile, Enrique Bernoldi spun and headed to the pits. On lap 23, Will Power crashed in turn 2. While the field pitted under the caution, Justin Wilson stayed out and took the lead.

Dixon took the lead back on the restart, and maintained the lead through the next series of pit stops. On lap 98, the caution came out again for a crash involving E. J. Viso and Tomas Scheckter. After another long green flag segment, Buddy Rice brought out the yellow on lap 153 with a heavy crash in turn 2. In the pits, Danica Patrick retired from the race with a broken wheel hub. Meanwhile, Scott Dixon, who had dominated most of the race, was shuffled back to seventh place.

The race resumed after a long yellow with Dan Wheldon leading. Wheldon pulled away and led the final 49 laps to record his first IndyCar Series victory since April 2007.

Top five finishers
Fin. Pos	St. Pos	Car No.	Driver	Team	Laps	Time	Laps Led
1	2	10	(United Kingdom) Dan Wheldon	Chip Ganassi Racing	200	1:52:49.9806	49
2	11	11	(Brazil) Tony Kanaan	Andretti Green Racing	200	+2.1778	0
3	1	9	(New Zealand) Scott Dixon	Chip Ganassi Racing	200	+4.3922	145
4	8	3	(Brazil) Hélio Castroneves	Penske Racing	200	+9.2889	1
5	14	26	(United States) Marco Andretti	Andretti Green Racing	200	+9.2986	0
Race average speed: 161.774 mph (260.350 km/h)
Lead changes: 5 between 4 drivers
Cautions: 4 for 41 laps

=== Round 5: Indianapolis 500 ===
- Sunday May 25–1:11 p.m. EDT
- Indianapolis Motor Speedway – Speedway, Indiana (2.5 mile oval)
- Distance: 200 laps / 500 miles (800 km)
- Race weather: Partly cloudy, 72 °F (22 °C)
- Television: ABC (Marty Reid, Scott Goodyear, Eddie Cheever, Brent Musburger, Jack Arute, Vince Welch, Brienne Pedigo, Jamie Little)
- Nielsen ratings: 4.5
- Attendance: estimated 400,000
- Pole Position winner: No. 9 Scott Dixon, 2:39.0348, 226.366 mph (364.301 km/h)

Polesitter Scott Dixon led 115 laps, including the last 29, to win his first Indy 500. Several cars, including Tony Kanaan, Graham Rahal, Jeff Simmons and Justin Wilson were involved in crashes. With 29 laps to go Danica Patrick was eliminated when Ryan Briscoe clipped her car exiting the pits, damaging both. They were fined $100,000 and placed on probation for their actions.

Top five finishers
Fin. Pos	St. Pos	Car No.	Driver	Team	Laps	Time	Laps Led
1	1	9	(New Zealand) Scott Dixon	Chip Ganassi Racing	200	3:28:57.6792	115
2	8	4	(Brazil) Vítor Meira	Panther Racing	200	+1.7498	12
3	7	26	(United States) Marco Andretti	Andretti Green Racing	200	+2.3127	15
4	4	3	(Brazil) Hélio Castroneves	Penske Racing	200	+6.2619	0
5	10	20	(United States) Ed Carpenter	Vision Racing	200	+6.5505	2
Race average speed: 143.567 mph (231.049 km/h)
Lead changes: 18 between 9 drivers
Cautions: 8 for 69 laps

=== Round 6: ABC Supply Company A. J. Foyt 225 ===
- Sunday June 1–3:00 p.m. CDT / 4:00 p.m. EDT
- Milwaukee Mile – West Allis, Wisconsin (1.032 mile oval)
- Distance: 225 laps / 232.2 miles (373.7 km)
- Race weather: 73 °F (23 °C), sunny
- Television: ESPN on ABC (Marty Reid, Scott Goodyear, Jack Arute, Vince Welch, Brienne Pedigo)
- Nielsen ratings: 0.8
- Attendance: 28,000
- Pole Position winner: No. 26 Marco Andretti 1:26.9591 168.053 mph (270.455 km/h) (4 laps)

Marco Andretti took the lead from the pole position, and led the first 40 laps. He was chased early by Scott Dixon and teammate Tony Kanaan. Graham Rahal, who started on the outside of the front row, shuffled back, but remained in the top 5 for the first half of the race.

The first half was mostly green, with only a minor caution involving Oriol Servia and another for debris. Later in the first fuel segment, Andretti's handling started to suffer, and Scott Dixon took over the lead. Hélio Castroneves took over second, and Andretti fell back as deep as tenth.

On lap 130, Graham Rahal went high in turn three to pass Darren Manning. He got into the marbles, and brushed along the wall in turn four. After holding the lead for 136 laps, Dixon was finally challenged by Ryan Briscoe. Briscoe took over the lead on lap 177, and held it until a green flag pit stop on lap 194. After a sequence of pit stops, Castroneves, Andretti and Wheldon all cycled near the front. When all pit stops were complete, Briscoe held a half-second lead over Dixon. The two battled for the lead over the final 21 laps.

With less than three laps to go, Marco Andretti dove underneath Ed Carpenter in turn one. The cars touched, and both cars spun into the wall. Vítor Meira became caught up in the smoke, and rode up over Andretti, becoming airborne. He landed upright, and all drivers were uninjured. The race finished under caution with Ryan Briscoe picking up his first career IndyCar victory, and 300th overall win for the Mooresville, North Carolina–based Penske Racing in all motorsports series.

Top five finishers
Fin. Pos	St. Pos	Car No.	Driver	Team	Laps	Time	Laps Led
1	11	6	(Australia) Ryan Briscoe	Penske Racing	225	1:42:41.7387	36
2	3	9	(New Zealand) Scott Dixon	Chip Ganassi Racing	225	+0.0487	147
3	6	11	(Brazil) Tony Kanaan	Andretti Green Racing	225	+1.8413	0
4	7	10	(United Kingdom) Dan Wheldon	Chip Ganassi Racing	225	+2.9314	0
5	5	3	(Brazil) Hélio Castroneves	Penske Racing	225	4.6704	2
Race average speed: 133.428 mph (214.732 km/h)
Lead changes: 5 between 4 drivers
Cautions: 4 for 29 laps

=== Round 7: Bombardier Learjet 550 ===
- Saturday June 7–9:00 p.m. CDT / 10:00 p.m. EDT
- Texas Motor Speedway – Fort Worth, Texas (1.455 mile oval)
- Distance: 228 laps / 331.74 miles (533.88 km)
- Race weather:
- Television: ESPN2 (Marty Reid, Scott Goodyear, Jack Arute, Brienne Pedigo)
- Nielsen ratings: 1.0 (highest rated IRL race broadcast on ESPN2 and second-highest rated IRL race on any ESPN station)
- Attendance: 83,000
- Pole Position winner: No. 9 Scott Dixon 1:37.5063 214.878 mph (345.813 km/h) (4 laps)

In the first half, three single-car incidents involving Mario Domínguez, Justin Wilson, and Oriol Servia slowed the race. The lead changed hands between Hélio Castroneves, Bruno Junqueira, and Scott Dixon for the first 100 laps.

Two sequences of green flag pit stops occurred under a long stretch of green flag conditions. A caution for debris came out on lap 165, sending the leaders to the pits once more. Vítor Meira stayed out to take over the lead.

With 21 laps to go, Meira was forced to pit for fuel, giving up the lead to Marco Andretti. Moments later, Enrique Bernoldi crashed in turn four. Andretti led the field back to green on lap 219.

With six laps to go, Scott Dixon slipped by Andretti to take the lead. On the next lap, down the backstretch, third place Ryan Hunter-Reay dove below Andretti heading into turn three. Hunter-Reay pinched his left wheels onto the apron, lost control, and touched wheels with Andretti. Both cars spun and crashed hard into the wall. The race finished under caution with Dixon the winner, and Hélio Castroneves slipping by the accident to finish second.

Top five finishers
Fin. Pos	St. Pos	Car No.	Driver	Team	Laps	Time	Laps Led
1	1	9	(New Zealand) Scott Dixon	Chip Ganassi Racing	228	2:04:36.3153	58
2	2	3	(Brazil) Hélio Castroneves	Penske Racing	228	+0.0479	85
3	3	6	(Australia) Ryan Briscoe	Penske Racing	228	+0.6173	12
4	7	10	(United Kingdom) Dan Wheldon	Chip Ganassi Racing	228	+3.3000	0
5	6	11	(Brazil) Tony Kanaan	Andretti Green Racing	228	+4.3124	0
Race average speed: 159.740 mph (257.077 km/h)
Lead changes: 21 between 6 drivers
Cautions: 8 for 52 laps

=== Round 8: Iowa Corn Indy 250 ===
- Sunday June 22–12:00 p.m. CDT / 1:00 p.m. EDT
- Iowa Speedway – Newton, Iowa (0.875 mile oval)
- Distance: 250 laps / 218.75 miles (352.04 km)
- Race weather: 80 °F (27 °C), Sunny
- Television: ABC (Marty Reid, Scott Goodyear, Jack Arute, Brienne Pedigo)
- Nielsen ratings: 1.1
- Attendance: 39,271
- Pole Position winner: No. 9 Scott Dixon (qualifying rained out; lineup set by IndyCar points standings)

At the green flag, Hélio Castroneves took the lead in turn 1 from polesitter Scott Dixon. Tony Kanaan quickly moved up to second position. Over the next 10–15 laps, Castroneves and Kanaan battled back-and-forth for the lead, side-by-side on many laps. Kanaan finally muscled the lead away on lap 16, and gained a lead of roughly one second.

On lap 39, Ed Carpenter brushed the outside wall in turn 2. The leaders pit, and Kanaan exited the pits as the leader. On lap 51, the green came back out, and a lap later, Castroneves got by Kanaan for the lead. Jaime Camara brought out the yellow on lap 106 when his car lost power and stopped on the course. After another sequence of pit stops, Tony Kanaan led Dan Wheldon and Marco Andretti. On the restart, Wheldon lost control and slid up the track, falling to 8th place.

On lap 157 Mario Moraes spun into the pit apron, bringing out a caution, and the leaders pitted. John Andretti's pitcrew had trouble engaging the fuel hose, and he dropped back the end of the running order. Prior to this he had been running in 7th place, one of the highest positions ever for a Roth Racing car.

Castroneves regained the lead on lap 170, and held it until another yellow came out on lap 188 for a spin by Enrique Bernoldi. Most of the leaders pitted, but Dan Wheldon, Hideki Mutoh, and Danica Patrick stayed out to lead the field. On the restart Mario Moraes spun for the second time of the day, and prolonged the yellow until lap 202. On lap 212, Tony Kanaan (running third) suddenly lost control and crashed in turn 1.

On the lap 227 restart, Marco Andretti and Scott Dixon passed Danica Patrick to take third and fourth place respectively. Over the final 15 laps, Mutoh and Andretti battled for second, with Mutoh holding off Andretti's challenge. Dan Wheldon went on to win, and Chip Ganassi Racing donated their race winnings from both cars to Iowa flood relief. After getting by Danica Patrick late in the race, A. J. Foyt IV finished in the top 5, while John Andretti just missed the top 10, working his way back to 11th.

Top five finishers
Fin. Pos	St. Pos	Car No.	Driver	Team	Laps	Time	Laps Led
1	3	10	(United Kingdom) Dan Wheldon	Chip Ganassi Racing	250	1:30:50.3110	61
2	7	27	(Japan) Hideki Mutoh	Andretti Green Racing	250	+0.1430	0
3	8	26	(United States) Marco Andretti	Andretti Green Racing	250	+0.9028	26
4	1	9	(New Zealand) Scott Dixon	Chip Ganassi Racing	250	+1.2726	0
5	18	2	(United States) A. J. Foyt IV	Vision Racing	250	+1.3564	0
Race average speed: 136.007 mph (218.882 km/h)
Lead changes: 9 between 4 drivers
Cautions: 6 for 57 laps

=== Round 9: SunTrust Indy Challenge ===
- Saturday June 28–8:00 p.m. EDT
- Richmond International Raceway – Richmond, Virginia (0.750 mile oval)
- Distance: 300 laps / 225 miles (362 km)
- Race weather: 89 °F (32 °C), Hazy
- Television: ESPN (Marty Reid, Scott Goodyear, Jack Arute, Brienne Pedigo)
- Nielsen ratings: 0.9
- Attendance: 60,000
- Pole Position winner: No. 11 Tony Kanaan 167.876 mph (270.170 km/h)

At the start, Ryan Hunter-Reay spun just before the start/finish line, which brought the yellow out immediately. The first 7 laps were run under yellow with Tony Kanaan leading from the pole position. On lap 8, the green came out, but only one lap was completed before the next yellow. Will Power was driving below Hélio Castroneves, lost control, and crashed in turn 4. The race finally got going on lap 21, when the green came out once again.

On lap 31, A. J. Foyt IV touched wheels with John Andretti, and Foyt crashed in the wall in turn 2. His Vision Racing teammate Ed Carpenter ran over debris from the crash, and both cars were sidelined. During the caution, a handful of cars pitted, including Danica Patrick and rookie Jaime Camara, but most of the leaders stayed on the track.

Kanaan continued to lead when debris brought out the caution again on lap 67. All of the leaders pitted, while Camara and Patrick stayed out and took the first two spots. On the restart, Camara led the field, but Buddy Rice spun and tagged the wall on the frontstretch. The field checked up, and Darren Manning, Ryan Briscoe and Bruno Junqueira were involved in a separate crash.

Camara led at the next restart, while Kanaan, Patrick, and Castroneves went 3-wide for second. Behind them in turn 2, John Andretti and Vítor Meira tangled, and crashed hard in the wall. Patrick returned to the pits, and topped off with fuel. Camara continued to lead, and impressively held off Kanaan on the restart. On lap 116, Marco Andretti caught up to Camara, and took the lead for the first time.

Graham Rahal crashed on lap 133 in turn 4. Many of the leaders pitted, but Andretti stayed out to lead. Another restart saw only three green laps, as yet another crash occurred, this time involving Ryan Hunter-Reay and Mario Moraes. Around this time, some teams anticipated that rain might end the race early.

Marco Andretti gave up the lead on lap 204 when he made his final pit stop. That put Tony Kanaan back into the lead. On lap 217, after a brilliant run in the top five, Jaime Camara lost control and crashed on the frontstretch. The yellow trapped Andretti a lap down, and kept Kanaan in the lead after the final sequence of pits stops. The rain held off, and Kanaan led the rest of the way for his first victory of the season.

Top five finishers
Fin. Pos	St. Pos	Car No.	Driver	Team	Laps	Time	Laps Led
1	1	11	(Brazil) Tony Kanaan	Andretti Green Racing	300	2:04:05.5111	166
2	18	3	(Brazil) Hélio Castroneves	Penske Racing	300	+4.7691	0
3	4	9	(New Zealand) Scott Dixon	Chip Ganassi Racing	300	+6.6504	0
4	6	10	(United Kingdom) Dan Wheldon	Chip Ganassi Racing	300	+7.7270	0
5	10	5	(Spain) Oriol Servia	KV Racing	300	+10.7701	0
Race average speed: 108.790 mph (175.081 km/h)
Lead changes: 3 between 3 drivers
Cautions: 9 for 102 laps

=== Round 10: Camping World Watkins Glen Grand Prix ===
- Sunday July 6–3:30 p.m. EDT
- Watkins Glen International – Watkins Glen, New York (3.40 mile permanent road course)
- Distance: 60 laps / 204 miles (328 km)
- Race weather:
- Television: ABC (Marty Reid, Scott Goodyear, Jack Arute, Brienne Pedigo)
- Nielsen ratings: 1.1
- Attendance: 30,000
- Pole Position winner: No. 6 Ryan Briscoe 1:29.3456 135.787 mph (218.528 km/h)

Polesitter Ryan Briscoe led from the start, but Scott Dixon, who qualified fourth, quickly passed Justin Wilson and Ryan Hunter-Reay to move into second for most of the first half of the race. Dixon was unable to pass Briscoe, but posed a serious challenge and posted comparable lap times.

The start of the race was relatively attrition-free, except for incidents involving two championship contenders. Dan Wheldon made contact with Darren Manning on the first lap, leading to suspension damage for Wheldon. On lap 6 Hélio Castroneves, who had started last after being unable to post a time in qualifying due to a broken throttle, snapping his streak of three consecutive poles at Watkins Glen, had a gearbox problem and stopped just shy of pit lane. With few other drivers dropping out in the first 40 laps, Dixon was poised to massively increase his points lead.

After a brief interlude when Vítor Meira led during a pit stop cycle, Briscoe and Dixon returned to the top two positions and thoroughly dominated the race, leading third-place Hunter-Reay by over 20 seconds. However, Meira and E. J. Viso made contact in turn 8 and the ensuing caution period allowed the other lead-lap cars to catch up to Briscoe and Dixon. All drivers pitted on this caution period except Manning, who stayed out of the pits in an attempt to stretch his fuel mileage. Dixon beat Briscoe and Hunter-Reay out of the pits, but Manning took the lead.

A brief green-flag period on lap 44 ended when Enrique Bernoldi crashed in turn 1, and then the race took a rather unusual turn, with two wrecks occurring under the caution period, before the race returned to green. A restart was waved off when A. J. Foyt IV and Milka Duno crashed in turn 9. Once that was cleaned up, and the IRL officials attempted to restart the race again, Dixon, who was swerving his tires to clean them, unexpectedly spun out and collected Briscoe. Hunter-Reay, who avoided the wreck, suddenly found himself second to Manning.

On lap 51, the race returned to green, with Manning ahead of Hunter-Reay. Hunter-Reay, who had no need to conserve fuel, newer tires, and a stronger car, easily dispatched of Manning in a short green-flag period before another caution came out for Jaime Camara's crash in turn 6. This was the final caution of the race, and Hunter-Reay won easily, claiming his first win in IndyCar, his first American open wheel win since 2004, and the Rahal Letterman Racing team's first win since 2004, with Buddy Rice. Manning did not come close to running out of fuel with all the cautions and finished second, his best career finish. With Castroneves, Wheldon, and Dixon's trouble, Tony Kanaan, who finished third, was the big gainer in the points standings, but Dixon still held a lead of 48 points on Castroneves, and 51 on Wheldon.

Top five finishers
Fin. Pos	St. Pos	Car No.	Driver	Team	Laps	Time	Laps Led
1	3	17	(United States) Ryan Hunter-Reay	Rahal Letterman Racing	60	1:54:01.1795	9
2	8	14	(United Kingdom) Darren Manning	A. J. Foyt Racing	60	+2.4009	10
3	6	11	(Brazil) Tony Kanaan	Andretti Green Racing	60	+4.1054	0
4	17	15	(United States) Buddy Rice	Dreyer & Reinbold Racing	60	+4.8111	0
5	7	26	(United States) Marco Andretti	Andretti Green Racing	60	+5.3132	0
Race average speed: 106.403 mph (171.239 km/h)
Lead changes: 5 between 4 drivers
Cautions: 6 for 14 laps

=== Round 11: Firestone Indy 200 ===
- Saturday July 12–7:00 p.m. CDT
- Nashville Superspeedway – Lebanon, Tennessee (1.333 mile concrete oval)
- Distance: 200 laps / 266.7 miles (429.2 km) (shortened to 171 laps / 228 miles (367 km) due to rain)
- Race weather: 85 °F (29 °C), rain throughout the afternoon and evening
- Television: ESPN (Marty Reid, Scott Goodyear, Jack Arute, Vince Welch, Brienne Pedigo)
- Nielsen ratings: 0.5
- Attendance: 29,000
- Pole Position winner: No. 3 Hélio Castroneves 1:31.5320 204.519 mph (329.141 km/h) 4-lap average

Pole winner Hélio Castroneves led at the start, with Danica Patrick second. On lap 3, Marco Andretti's car wiggled in turn 2, made contact with Ryan Briscoe, and both cars crashed into the outside wall. After the caution, Castroneves continued to lead, and Patrick held on to second.

On lap 45, Patrick attempted to take the lead, but Castroneves was able to hold the position. The move shuffled Patrick back to fifth position. After the first sequence of pit stops, the lead changed hands between Scott Dixon and Tony Kanaan. Kanaan held the lead through the next caution, when Ryan Hunter-Reay crashed in turn 3 on lap 100. All of the leaders pitted under the yellow on lap 102.

On lap 139, Kanaan continued to lead when a light rain brought out the caution. On lap 149, Kanaan, Vítor Meira, Patrick, Castroneves, and others, pitted for tires and fuel. Scott Dixon and Dan Wheldon, however, stayed out and moved into the lead. When the rain stopped, the race went back to green on lap 152.

Scott Dixon led Dan Wheldon as the race passed the 160 lap mark (40 laps to go). With fuel running low, both cars gambled on the rain resuming. On lap 166, rain began to fall, with Dixon the leader. Heavy rain put out the red flag after lap 171. Fifteen minutes later, the race was called, and Scott Dixon was declared the winner.

Top five finishers
Fin. Pos	St. Pos	Car No.	Driver	Team	Laps	Time	Laps Led
1	5	9	(New Zealand) Scott Dixon	Chip Ganassi Racing	171	1:30:04.6499	53
2	6	10	(United Kingdom) Dan Wheldon	Chip Ganassi Racing	171	+1.0680	0
3	1	3	(Brazil) Hélio Castroneves	Penske Racing	171	+4.1054	54
4	7	11	(Brazil) Tony Kanaan	Andretti Green Racing	171	+6.4612	59
5	2	7	(United States) Danica Patrick	Andretti Green Racing	171	+7.8301	0
Race average speed: 148.072 mph (238.299 km/h)
Lead changes: 5 between 4 drivers
Cautions: 4 for 37 laps

=== Round 12: Honda 200 ===
- Sunday July 20–1:30 p.m. CDT
- Mid-Ohio Sports Car Course – Lexington, Ohio (2.4 mile permanent road course)
- Distance: 85 laps / 191.93 miles (308.88 km)
- Race weather:
- Television: ABC (Marty Reid, Scott Goodyear, Jack Arute, Vince Welch, Brienne Pedigo)
- Nielsen ratings: 1.5 (overnight), 1.3 (final)
- Attendance:
- Pole Position winner: No. 3 Hélio Castroneves 1:07.2480 120.878 mph (194.534 km/h)

Top five finishers
Fin. Pos	St. Pos	Car No.	Driver	Team	Laps	Time	Laps Led
1	2	6	(Australia) Ryan Briscoe	Penske Racing	85	2:01:22.8496	43
2	1	3	(Brazil) Hélio Castroneves	Penske Racing	85	+7.2640	5
3	6	9	(New Zealand) Scott Dixon	Chip Ganassi Racing	85	+7.6967	0
4	12	8	(Australia) Will Power	KV Racing	85	+12.7569	3
5	8	5	(Spain) Oriol Servia	KV Racing	85	+13.4713	0
Race average speed: 94.873 mph (152.683 km/h)
Lead changes: 7 between 7 drivers
Cautions: 5 for 19 laps

=== Round 13: Rexall Edmonton Indy ===
- Saturday July 26–3:00 p.m. MDT / 5:00 p.m. EDT
- Edmonton City Centre Airport – Edmonton, Alberta (1.96 mile temporary airport course)
- Distance: 95 laps / 186.2 miles (299.7 km) (shortened to 91 laps / 178.36 miles (287.04 km) due to 1-hour 50-minute time limit)
- Race weather: 83F
- Television: ESPN (Bob Jenkins, Scott Goodyear, Jon Beekhuis, Brienne Pedigo)
- Nielsen ratings: 0.8
- Attendance: 60,000
- Pole Position winner: No. 6 Ryan Briscoe 1:00.7311 116.955 mph (188.221 km/h)

Top five finishers
Fin. Pos	St. Pos	Car No.	Driver	Team	Laps	Time	Laps Led
1	4	9	(New Zealand) Scott Dixon	Chip Ganassi Racing	91	1:51:05.7039	30
2	2	3	(Brazil) Hélio Castroneves	Penske Racing	91	+5.9237	35
3	6	02	(United Kingdom) Justin Wilson	Newman/Haas/Lanigan Racing	91	+13.4009	0
4	15	22	(Canada) Paul Tracy	Vision Racing	91	+28.1462	0
5	3	5	(Spain) Oriol Servia	KV Racing	91	+28.7132	0
Race average speed: 96.967 mph (156.053 km/h)
Lead changes: 9 between 6 drivers
Cautions: 4 for 19 laps

=== Round 14: Meijer Indy 300 ===
- Saturday August 9–6:30 p.m. CDT / 5:30 p.m. EDT
- Kentucky Speedway – Sparta, Kentucky (1.5 mile oval)
- Distance: 200 laps / 300 miles (480 km)
- Race weather:
- Television: ESPN2 (Marty Reid, Scott Goodyear, Jack Arute, Vince Welch, Brienne Pedigo)
- Nielsen ratings: 0.43 (overnight)
- Attendance: 66,000+
- Pole Position winner: No. 9 Scott Dixon, 218.968 mph (352.395 km/h)

This race had a shuffling finish, with Dixon, Andretti and Meira each leading at least one lap in the dying stages before pitting for splash-and-go stops. Castroneves inherited the lead, stayed out as his team assumed he would have enough fuel to finish, and was still leading when the white flag came out. But on the final corner, Castroneves ran out of fuel and Dixon flew past to take his sixth win of the season.

Top five finishers
Fin. Pos	St. Pos	Car No.	Driver	Team	Laps	Time	Laps Led
1	1	9	(New Zealand) Scott Dixon	Chip Ganassi Racing	200	1:36:42.3467	151
2	6	3	(Brazil) Hélio Castroneves	Penske Racing	200	+0.5532	5
3	9	26	(United States) Marco Andretti	Andretti Green Racing	200	+0.5707	38
4	2	4	(Brazil) Vítor Meira	Panther Racing	200	+0.9102	5
5	3	10	(United Kingdom) Dan Wheldon	Chip Ganassi Racing	200	+2.1472	0
Race average speed: 183.650 mph (295.556 km/h)
Lead changes: 10 between 5 drivers
Cautions: 4 for 19 laps

=== Round 15: Peak Antifreeze & Motor Oil Indy Grand Prix ===
- Sunday August 24–2:30 p.m. PDT / 5:30 p.m. EDT
- Infineon Raceway – Sonoma, California (2.303 mile road course)
- Distance: 80 laps / 184.24 miles (296.51 km)
- Race weather:
- Television: ESPN2 (Marty Reid, Scott Goodyear, Jack Arute, Vince Welch, Brienne Pedigo)
- Nielsen ratings: 0.41
- Attendance:
- Pole Position winner: No. 3 Hélio Castroneves 1:16.9027 sec, 107.809 mph (173.502 km/h)

After so many second places, Castroneves claimed his long-awaited first win of the season and closed the gap on Dixon in the title race.

Top five finishers
Fin. Pos	St. Pos	Car No.	Driver	Team	Laps	Time	Laps Led
1	1	3	(Brazil) Hélio Castroneves	Penske Racing	80	1:50:15.8282	51
2	2	6	(Australia) Ryan Briscoe	Penske Racing	80	+5.2926	19
3	4	11	(Brazil) Tony Kanaan	Andretti Green Racing	80	+16.6032	1
4	16	10	(United Kingdom) Dan Wheldon	Chip Ganassi Racing	80	+17.7720	0
5	9	7	(United States) Danica Patrick	Andretti Green Racing	80	+25.8458	0
Race average speed: 100.254 mph (161.343 km/h)
Lead changes: 8 between 4 drivers
Cautions: 1 for 2 laps

=== Round 16: Detroit Indy Grand Prix ===
- Sunday August 31–2:30 p.m. CDT / 3:30 p.m. EDT
- The Raceway on Belle Isle – Detroit, Michigan (2.07 mile temporary street course)
- Distance: 90 laps / 186.3 miles (299.8 km) (shortened to 87 laps / 180.09 miles (289.83 km) due to 2-hour time limit)
- Race weather: 86F
- Television: ABC (Marty Reid, Scott Goodyear, Jack Arute, Vince Welch, Brienne Pedigo)
- Nielsen ratings: 0.9
- Attendance: 100,000 (weekend)
- Pole Position winner: No. 9 Scott Dixon 1:12.2861 sec, 103.090 mph (165.907 km/h)

The finish to this race was not without controversy. Late in the race, Castroneves led Wilson by less than a second, and Castroneves appeared to make an illegal block, causing IRL officials to penalize him, allowing Wilson to move past and take the win by more than 4 seconds.

Top five finishers
Fin. Pos	St. Pos	Car No.	Driver	Team	Laps	Time	Laps Led
1	4	02	(United Kingdom) Justin Wilson	Newman/Haas/Lanigan Racing	87	2:00:10.7618	15
2	2	3	(Brazil) Hélio Castroneves	Penske Racing	87	+4.4058	53
3	8	11	(Brazil) Tony Kanaan	Andretti Green Racing	87	+17.6815	0
4	3	5	(Spain) Oriol Servia	KV Racing	87	+26.5468	0
5	1	9	(New Zealand) Scott Dixon	Chip Ganassi Racing	87	+27.7185	18
Race average speed: 89.911 mph (144.698 km/h)
Lead changes: 4 between 4 drivers
Cautions: 4 for 11 laps

=== Round 17: Peak Antifreeze & Motor Oil Indy 300 ===
- Sunday September 7–2:30 p.m. CDT / 3:30 p.m. EDT
- Chicagoland Speedway – Joliet, Illinois (1.52 mile oval)
- Distance: 200 laps / 304 miles (489 km)
- Race weather:
- Television: ABC (Marty Reid, Scott Goodyear, Jack Arute, Vince Welch, Brienne Pedigo)
- Nielsen ratings: 0.8
- Attendance:
- Pole Position winner: No. 6 Ryan Briscoe, 215.818 mph (347.325 km/h)

The final points race saw Hélio Castroneves winning his second round of the season, having started from last position after being demoted to the rear of the grid due to him illegally moving his car below the white line during qualifications. His drive from 28th to first was the farthest back a driver has won an IndyCar Series race from. The Brazilian held off the newly crowned champion Scott Dixon by 0.0033 seconds or 12 1/8 inches (310 mm), in the second closest finish in the twelve-year history of the series. The race was originally given to Dixon by what would have been a closest winning margin of 0.0010 seconds, but the result was changed following a review. Hideki Mutoh claimed rookie of the year after he finished 22nd and Justin Wilson could finish no higher than 11th.

Top five finishers
Fin. Pos	St. Pos	Car No.	Driver	Team	Laps	Time	Laps Led
1	28	3	(Brazil) Hélio Castroneves	Penske Racing	200	2:01:04.5907	79
2	2	9	(New Zealand) Scott Dixon	Chip Ganassi Racing	200	+0.0033	15
3	1	6	(Australia) Ryan Briscoe	Penske Racing	200	+0.0811	41
4	4	11	(Brazil) Tony Kanaan	Andretti Green Racing	200	+0.6128	47
5	10	8	(Australia) Will Power	KV Racing	200	+1.3613	0
Race average speed: 150.649 mph (242.446 km/h)
Lead changes: 22 between 6 drivers
Cautions: 7 for 53 laps

=== Nikon Indy 300 ===
- Sunday October 26–12:30 p.m. AEST / Saturday October 25–10:30 p.m. EDT
- Surfers Paradise Street Circuit – Surfers Paradise, Australia (2.795 mile temporary street circuit)
- Distance: 60 laps / 167.7 miles (269.9 km)
- Race weather: 82F
- Television: ESPN Classic (Bob Jenkins, Scott Goodyear, Jon Beekhuis) / Seven Network (Matthew White, Aaron Noonan, Scott Pruett, Brienne Pedigo)
- Nielsen ratings: 0.20
- Attendance: 94,465 (race day), 297,288 (weekend)
- Pole Position winner: No. 8 Will Power 1:34.9451 sec, 105.977 mph (169.563 km/h)

Justin Wilson pitted on the warm-up lap, with the gearbox sticking in third, but joined the start from the back. Will Power immediately dominated the start, pulling a two-second lead on the first lap. Scott Dixon started second but after being forced to cut the first chicane was relegated behind Ryan Briscoe by officialdom.

Mario Moraes and Vítor Meira clashed at the second chicane with Meira spinning without hitting anyone. A few lap later Moraes caused the first safety car, clipping the turn 2 chicane, breaking the right rear corner of the car. Townsend Bell was eliminated after a clash with Hélio Castroneves which wrecked Bell's steering. Later the same lap Castroneves had a right rear puncture caused by Danica Patrick's front wing while passing the Andretti Green Racing driver.

Lap 17 saw the end of Power's dominance of the meeting as he crashed at the Bartercard chicane, which put Briscoe into the lead ahead of Dixon. Briscoe pitted for fuel immediately upon catching the tailmarker, Patrick, but Dixon waited another lap and was held up behind Patrick. At the same time Graham Rahal touched the rear of Ed Carpenter, spinning the Vision Racing car around, almost blocking the track. The emerging safety car almost hit Dixon as he completed his stop.

Behind the safety car Patrick stopped and stalled, almost hitting the stationary car of Carpenter. Dario Franchitti clipped the tyre bundle on the inside of the same chicane and spun and stalled bringing out the safety car. After the restart Tony Kanaan had the right rear suspension break without apparent reason.

After the second round of pitstops the battle for third between Alex Tagliani and Ryan Hunter-Reay was interrupted by Franchitti as a poor pitstop and a poor pit position for Conquest Racing saw Tagliani drop several position behind E. J. Viso. Viso later would twice have to give up spots for cutting chicanes, first to Tagliani, then Castroneves. Lap 48 saw Jaime Camara go straight on and stalled the car attempting to recover.

In the races closing stages Dixon closed in on Briscoe, the two remaining local drivers lapping significantly faster than the rest of the field. Carpenter hit the wall at turn 3 on the last lap but it did not affect the lead battle and Briscoe won his home race ahead of Dixon and Hunter-Reay finished third.

Top five finishers
Fin. Pos	St. Pos	Car No.	Driver	Team	Laps	Time	Laps Led
1	3	6	(Australia) Ryan Briscoe	Penske Racing	60	1:45:50.3868	39
2	2	9	(New Zealand) Scott Dixon	Chip Ganassi Racing	60	+0.5019	1
3	5	17	(United States) Ryan Hunter-Reay	Rahal Letterman Racing	60	+9.1179	9
4	7	36	(Canada) Alex Tagliani	Conquest Racing	60	+19.9844	1
5	15	5	(Spain) Oriol Servia	KV Racing	60	+20.4376	0
Race average speed: 95.068 mph (152.997 km/h)
Lead changes: 7 between 6 drivers
Cautions: 3 for 6 laps

== Points standings ==
- Ties in points broken by number of wins, followed by number of 2nds, 3rds, etc., and then by number of pole positions, followed by number of times qualified 2nd, etc.

=== Driver standings ===
Pos	Driver	HOM	STP	MOT^{1}	LBH^{1}	KAN	INDY	MIL	TMS	IOW	RIC	WGL	NSS	MOH	EDM	KEN	SON	BEL	CHI	Pts	SUR^{2}
1	(New Zealand) Scott Dixon	**1**	22	3*		**3***	**1***	2*	**1**	**4**	3	11	1	3	1	**1***	12	**5**	2	646	2
2	(Brazil) Hélio Castroneves	4	2	**2**		4	4	5	2*	14*	2	16	**3**	**2**	2*	2	**1***	2*	1*	629	7
3	(Brazil) Tony Kanaan	8	**3**	5		2	29	3	5	18	**1***	3	4*	7	9	8	3	3	4	513	21
4	(United Kingdom) Dan Wheldon	3	12	4		1	12	4	4	1	4	24	2	17	7	5	4	20	6	492	11
5	(Australia) Ryan Briscoe	19	23	9		7	23	1	3	7	15	**12***	23	1*	**6**	7	2	9	**3**	447	1*
6	(United States) Danica Patrick	6	10	1		19	22	9	10	6	6	14	5	12	18	11	5	16	10	379	18
7	(United States) Marco Andretti	2*	25	18		5	3	**21**	19	3	9	5	24	25	17	3	14	18	8	363	13
8	(United States) Ryan Hunter-Reay	7	17	7		18	6	15	20	8	16	1	19	10	8	9	18	6	9	360	3
9	(Spain) Oriol Servià	12	7		5	11	11	6	26	16	5	23	16	5	5	12	15	4	17	358	5
10	(Japan) Hideki Mutoh RY	24	6	11		6	7	12	6	2	13	9	14	9	27	18	13	11	22	346	8
11	(United Kingdom) Justin Wilson R	15	9		**19**	9	27	7	27	12	7	25	18	11	3	24	9	1	11	340	12
12	(Australia) Will Power R	25	8		1*	27	13	14	13	9	25	15	11	4	22	26	25	8	5	331	**22**
13	(Brazil) Vítor Meira	10	19	16		22	2	22	7	15	20	22	6	6	19	4	7	17	27	324	14
14	(United Kingdom) Darren Manning	13	13	8		24	9	13	28	21	12	2	9	8	10	19	22	12	7	323	
15	(United States) Ed Carpenter	5	18	6		10	5	20	9	23	11	17	8	15	13	6	23	14	28	320	20
16	(United States) Buddy Rice	11	15	12		20	8	10	8	22	22	4	7	20	11	10	11	19	25	306	10
17	(United States) Graham Rahal R		1*		13	12	33	25	11	10	18	8	12	16	26	25	8	13	19	288	9
18	(Venezuela) E. J. Viso R	17	4		9	14	26	8	14	13	10	10		22	15	13	6	24	23	286	6
19	(United States) A. J. Foyt IV	9	11	15		8	21	17	12	5	24	19	22	18	12	20	20	10	13	280	17
20	(Brazil) Bruno Junqueira	23	24		12	15	20	18	15	Wth	23	6	15	13	14	14	17	7	20	256	15
21	(Brazil) Mario Moraes R	16	16		20	17	18	23	18	19	17	7	10	24	20	17	10	15	21	244	24
22	(Brazil) Enrique Bernoldi R	18	5		4	25	15	16	23	17	26	21	20	26	16	22	21	Wth		220	
23	(Brazil) Jaime Camara R					21	31	24	24	20	14	18	21	14	23	16	24	25	18	174	19
24	(Canada) Marty Roth	21	DNS	17		26	32	Wth	22	Wth	19		13	21	21	23	26	Wth	16	166	
25	(Venezuela) Milka Duno	20				16	19		17	24		20	17	23		21		23	14	140	
26	(United States) Townsend Bell		21	10			10	11			8				25		19			117	23
27	(Mexico) Mario Domínguez R				3		DNQ	26	21			13		19	24		16			112	
28	(United Kingdom) Jay Howard R	22	14	13		13	Wth					26								72	
29	(France) Franck Perera R	14	20		6														15	71	
30	(United States) John Andretti						16	19	16	11	21									71	
31	(South Africa) Tomas Scheckter					23	24		25								27	21	26	66	
32	(Canada) Alex Tagliani				7													22	12	56	4
33	(Canada) Paul Tracy				11										4					51	
34	(United States) Sarah Fisher						30									15			24	37	
35	(United States) Roger Yasukawa			14			DNQ													16	
36	(United States) Davey Hamilton						14													16	
37	(United States) Buddy Lazier						17													13	
38	(United Kingdom) Alex Lloyd R						25													10	
39	(United States) Jeff Simmons						28													10	
40	(France) Franck Montagny ^{3} R				2															0	
41	(Mexico) David Martínez ^{3} R				8															0	
42	(United States) Jimmy Vasser ^{3}				10															0	
43	(United States) Alex Figge ^{3} R				14															0	
44	(France) Nelson Philippe ^{3} R				15															0	
45	(Brazil) Antônio Pizzonia ^{3} R				16															0	
46	(Brazil) Roberto Moreno ^{3}				17															0	
47	(Finland) Juho Annala ^{3} R				18															0	
—	(United Kingdom) Dario Franchitti																			0	16
—	(United States) Phil Giebler R						DNQ													0	
—	(Italy) Max Papis						DNQ													0	
Pos	Driver	HOM	STP	MOT^{1}	LBH^{1}	KAN	INDY	MIL	TMS	IOW	RIC	WGL	NSS	MOH	EDM	KEN	SON	BEL	CHI	Pts	SUR^{2}

Color	Result
Gold	Winner
Silver	2nd place
Bronze	3rd place
Green	4th & 5th place
Light Blue	6th–10th place
Dark Blue	Finished (Outside Top 10)
Purple	Did not finish (Ret)
Red	Did not qualify (DNQ)
Brown	Withdrawn (Wth)
Black	Disqualified (DSQ)
White	Did not start (DNS)
Blank	Did not participate (DNP)
Blank	Not competing

**In-Line Notation**
**Bold**	Pole position
Italics	Ran fastest race lap
*	Led most race laps (3 points)
DNS	Any driver who qualifies but does not start (DNS), earns half the points had they taken part.
Note ^{1}	Races run on same day (Motegi / IndyCar) (Long Beach / Champ Car)
Note ^{2}	Non-championship round (no points awarded)
Note ^{3}	no points awarded (Long Beach participants did not enter other 2008 IndyCar races)
RY Rookie of the Year
R Rookie

=== Entrant standings ===
- Based on the entrant, used for oval qualifications order, and starting grids when qualifying is cancelled
- Only full-time entrants, and at-large part-time entrants shown.

Pos	Driver	HOM	STP	MOT^{1}	LBH^{1}	KAN	INDY	MIL	TMS	IOW	RIC	WGL	NSS	MOH	EDM	KEN	SON	BEL	CHI	Pts
1	#9 Chip Ganassi Racing	**1**	22	3*		**3***	**1***	2*	**1**	**4**	3	11	1	3	1	**1***	12	**5**	2	646
2	#3 Team Penske	4	2	**2**		4	4	5	2*	14*	2	16	**3**	**2**	2*	2	**1***	2*	1*	629
3	#11 Andretti Autosport	8	**3**	5		2	29	3	5	18	**1***	3	4*	7	9	8	3	3	4	513
4	#10 Chip Ganassi Racing	3	12	4		1	12	4	4	1	4	24	2	17	7	5	4	20	6	492
5	#6 Team Penske	19	23	9		7	23	1	3	7	15	**12***	23	1*	**6**	7	2	9	**3**	447
6	#7 Andretti Autosport	6	10	1		19	22	9	10	6	6	14	5	12	18	11	5	16	10	379
7	#26 Andretti Autosport	2*	25	18		5	3	**21**	19	3	9	5	24	25	17	3	14	18	8	363
8	#17 Rahal Letterman Racing	7	17	7		18	6	15	20	8	16	1	19	10	8	9	18	6	9	360
9	#5 KV Racing Technology	12	7		5	11	11	6	26	16	5	23	16	5	5	12	15	4	17	358
10	#27 Andretti Autosport	24	6	11		6	7	12	6	2	13	9	14	9	27	18	13	11	22	346
11	#02 Newman/Haas Racing	15	9		**19**	9	27	7	27	12	7	25	18	11	3	24	9	1	11	340
12	#8 KV Racing Technology	25	8		1*	27	13	14	13	9	25	15	11	4	22	26	25	8	5	331
13	#4 Panther Racing	10	19	16		22	2	22	7	15	20	22	6	6	19	4	7	17	27	324
14	#14 A. J. Foyt Enterprises	13	13	8		24	9	13	28	21	12	2	9	8	10	19	22	12	7	323
15	#20 Vision Racing	5	18	6		10	5	20	9	23	11	17	8	15	13	6	23	14	28	320
16	#15 Dreyer & Reinbold Racing	11	15	12		20	8	10	8	22	22	4	7	20	11	10	11	19	25	306
17	#06 Newman/Haas Racing		1*		13	12	33	25	11	10	18	8	12	16	26	25	8	13	19	288
18	#33 HVM Racing	17	4		9	14	26	8	14	13	10	10		22	15	13	6	24	23	286
19	#2 Vision Racing	9	11	15		8	21	17	12	5	24	19	22	18	12	20	20	10	13	280
20	#18 Dale Coyne Racing	23	24		12	15	20	18	15	Wth	23	6	15	13	14	14	17	7	20	256
21	#36 Conquest Racing	18	5		4	25	15	16	23	17	26	21	20	26	16	22	21	22	12	250
22	#19 Dale Coyne Racing	16	16		20	17	18	23	18	19	17	7	10	24	20	17	10	15	21	244
23	#23 Dreyer & Reinbold Racing	20	21	10		16	19	11	17	24	8	20	17	23	25	21	19|	23	14	237
24	#34 Conquest Racing	14	20		6	21	31	24	24	20	14	18	21	14	23	16	24	25	18	230
25	#25 Roth Racing	21	DNS	17		26	32	Wth	22	Wth	19		13	21	21	23	26	Wth	16	166
26	#24 Roth Racing	22	14	13		13	16	19	16	11	21	26								143
27	#96 Pacific Coast Motorsports				3		DNQ	26	21			13		19	24		16			112
28	#12 Luczo Dragon Racing					23	24		25								27	21	26	66
Pos	Driver	HOM	STP	MOT^{1}	LBH^{1}	KAN	INDY	MIL	TMS	IOW	RIC	WGL	NSS	MOH	EDM	KEN	SON	BEL	CHI	Pts

== See also ==
- 2008 Indianapolis 500
- 2008 Indy Lights season
- 2008 Champ Car season (cancelled)
- 2008 Atlantic Championship season
