= 2008 Honda 200 =

The layout of Mid-Ohio Sports Car Course

The 2008 Honda Indy 200 at Mid-Ohio presented by Westfield Insurance was the twelfth round of the 2008 IndyCar Series season. It took place on 20 July 2008. Ryan Briscoe won the race.

== Race results ==
Pos	No.	Driver	Team	Laps	Time/Retired	Grid	Laps Led	Points
1	6	(Australia) Ryan Briscoe	Team Penske	85	2:01:22.8496	2	43	50+3
2	3	(Brazil) Hélio Castroneves	Team Penske	85	+7.2640	1	5	40
3	9	(New Zealand) Scott Dixon	Chip Ganassi Racing	85	+7.6967	6	0	35
4	8	(Australia) Will Power	KV Racing Technology	85	+12.7569	12	3	32
5	5	(Spain) Oriol Servià	KV Racing Technology	85	+13.4713	8	0	30
6	4	(Brazil) Vítor Meira	Panther Racing	85	+14.9934	11	21	28
7	11	(Brazil) Tony Kanaan	Andretti Green Racing	85	+15.2597	5	0	26
8	14	(United Kingdom) Darren Manning	A. J. Foyt Racing	85	+17.5053	21	1	24
9	27	(Japan) Hideki Mutoh (R)	Andretti Green Racing	85	+18.0084	10	0	22
10	17	(United States) Ryan Hunter-Reay	Rahal Letterman Racing	85	+19.2100	15	0	20
11	02	(United Kingdom) Justin Wilson	Newman/Haas/Lanigan Racing	85	+28.8880	4	11	19
12	7	(United States) Danica Patrick	Andretti Green Racing	85	+34.6822	20	0	18
13	18	(Brazil) Bruno Junqueira	Dale Coyne Racing	85	+39.7940	9	0	17
14	34	(Brazil) Jaime Camara (R)	Conquest Racing	85	+51.5572	25	0	16
15	20	(United States) Ed Carpenter	Vision Racing	85	+1:09.9192	22	0	15
16	06	(United States) Graham Rahal	Newman/Haas/Lanigan Racing	84	+1 Lap	14	0	14
17	10	(United Kingdom) Dan Wheldon	Chip Ganassi Racing	84	+1 Lap	13	0	13
18	2	(United States) A. J. Foyt IV	Vision Racing	84	+1 Lap	23	0	12
19	96	(Mexico) Mario Domínguez	Pacific Coast Motorsports	83	+2 Laps	16	0	12
20	15	(United States) Buddy Rice	Dreyer & Reinbold Racing	82	+3 Laps	7	0	12
21	25	(Canada) Marty Roth	Roth Racing	80	+5 Laps	24	0	12
22	33	(Venezuela) E. J. Viso (R)	HVM Racing	80	+5 Laps	17	0	12
23	23	(Venezuela) Milka Duno	Dreyer & Reinbold Racing	79	+6 Laps	26	0	12
24	19	(Brazil) Mario Moraes (R)	Dale Coyne Racing	61	Off Course	19	1	12
25	26	(United States) Marco Andretti	Andretti Green Racing	41	Contact	3	0	10
26	36	(Brazil) Enrique Bernoldi (R)	Conquest Racing	8	Contact	18	0	10

Previous race: 2008 Firestone Indy 200	IndyCar Series; 2008 season	Next race: 2008 Rexall Edmonton Indy
Previous race: 2007 Honda 200	2008 Honda 200	Next race: 2009 Honda 200
