= 2008 RoadRunner Turbo Indy 300 =

(United States) 2008 Kansas
Race details
- 4th round of the 2008 IndyCar Series season
- Date: April 27, 2008
- Official name: RoadRunner Turbo Indy 300
- Location: Kansas Speedway
- Course: Permanent racing facility 1.520 mi / 2.446 km
- Distance: 200 laps 304.000 mi / 489.241 km
- Weather: 59 °F (15 °C), Mostly sunny

Pole position
- Driver: (New Zealand) Scott Dixon ( (United States) Chip Ganassi Racing)
- Time: 1:42.3014 (4 laps)

Fastest lap
- Driver: (New Zealand) Scott Dixon ( (United States) Chip Ganassi Racing)
- Time: 25.5084 (on lap 175 of 200)

Podium
- First: (United Kingdom) Dan Wheldon ( (United States) Chip Ganassi Racing)
- Second: (Brazil) Tony Kanaan ( (United States) Andretti Green Racing)
- Third: (New Zealand) Scott Dixon ( (United States) Chip Ganassi Racing)

The 2008 RoadRunner Turbo Indy 300 was the fourth round of the 2008 IndyCar Series season and took place on April 27, 2008 at the 1.520-mile (2.446 km) Kansas Speedway. At the start, Scott Dixon took the lead from the pole position. Meanwhile, Enrique Bernoldi spun and headed to the pits. On lap 23, Will Power crashed in turn 2. While the field pitted under the caution, Justin Wilson stayed out and took the lead. Dixon took the lead back on the restart, and maintained the lead through the next series of pit stops. On lap 98, the caution came out again for a crash involving E. J. Viso and Tomas Scheckter. After another long green flag segment, Buddy Rice brought out the yellow on lap 153 with a heavy crash in turn 2. In the pits, Danica Patrick retired from the race with a broken wheel hub. Meanwhile, Dixon, who had dominated most of the race, was shuffled back to seventh place.

The race resumed after a long yellow with Dan Wheldon leading. Wheldon pulled away and led the final 49 laps to record his first IndyCar Series victory since April 2007.

Finish	Car No.	Driver	Team	Laps	Time/Retired	Grid	Laps Led	Points
1	10	(United Kingdom) Dan Wheldon	Chip Ganassi Racing	200	1:52:49.9806	2	49	50
2	11	(Brazil) Tony Kanaan	Andretti Green Racing	200	+2.1778	11	0	40
3	9	(New Zealand) Scott Dixon	Chip Ganassi Racing	200	+4.3922	1	145	38
4	3	(Brazil) Hélio Castroneves	Penske Racing	200	+9.2889	8	1	32
5	26	(United States) Marco Andretti	Andretti Green Racing	200	+9.2986	14	0	30
6	27	(Japan) Hideki Mutoh (R)	Andretti Green Racing	200	+9.5717	13	0	28
7	6	(Australia) Ryan Briscoe	Penske Racing	200	+9.7123	9	0	26
8	2	(United States) A. J. Foyt IV	Vision Racing	200	+14.2868	5	0	24
9	02	(United Kingdom) Justin Wilson (R)	Newman/Haas/Lanigan Racing	199	+1 Lap	22	5	22
10	20	(United States) Ed Carpenter	Vision Racing	198	+2 Laps	6	0	20
11	5	(Spain) Oriol Servià (R)	KV Racing	198	+2 Laps	23	0	19
12	06	(United States) Graham Rahal	Newman/Haas/Lanigan Racing	198	+2 Laps	20	0	18
13	24	(United Kingdom) Jay Howard	Roth Racing	197	+3 Laps	15	0	17
14	33	(Venezuela) E. J. Viso (R)	HVM Racing	197	+3 Laps	17	0	16
15	18	(Brazil) Bruno Junqueira	Dale Coyne Racing	196	+4 Laps	26	0	15
16	23	(Venezuela) Milka Duno	Dreyer & Reinbold Racing	195	+5 Laps	24	0	14
17	19	(Brazil) Mario Moraes (R)	Dale Coyne Racing	193	+7 Laps	27	0	13
18	17	(United States) Ryan Hunter-Reay (R)	Rahal Letterman Racing	169	+31 Laps	12	0	12
19	7	(United States) Danica Patrick	Andretti Green Racing	156	Wheel Hub	3	0	12
20	15	(United States) Buddy Rice	Dreyer & Reinbold Racing	150	Accident	21	0	12
21	34	(Brazil) Jaime Camara (R)	Conquest Racing	150	+50 Laps	19	0	12
22	4	(Brazil) Vítor Meira	Panther Racing	101	Mechanical	10	0	12
23	12	(South Africa) Tomas Scheckter	Luczo Dragon Racing	96	Handling	4	0	12
24	14	(United Kingdom) Darren Manning	A. J. Foyt Enterprises	76	Handling	16	0	12
25	36	(Brazil) Enrique Bernoldi (R)	Conquest Racing	54	Handling	25	0	10
26	25	(Canada) Marty Roth	Roth Racing	41	Handling	7	0	10
27	8	(Australia) Will Power (R)	KV Racing	22	Accident	18	0	10
Race average speed: 161.774 mph (260.350 km/h)
Lead changes: 5 between 4 drivers
Cautions: 4 for 41 laps

Preceded by Indy Japan 300 (IRL teams; 3A); Toyota Grand Prix of Long Beach (Transition teams; 3B)	IRL IndyCar Series round 4; 2008	Succeeded by Indianapolis 500
