= 2008 SunTrust Indy Challenge =

(United States) 2008 Richmond
Race details
- 9th round of the 2008 IndyCar Series season
- Date: June 28, 2008
- Official name: SunTrust Indy Challenge
- Location: Richmond International Raceway
- Course: Permanent racing facility 0.750 mi / 1.207 km
- Distance: 300 laps 225.000 mi / 362.102 km
- Weather: 89 °F (32 °C), Hazy

Pole position
- Driver: (Brazil) Tony Kanaan ( (United States) Andretti Green Racing)
- Time: 1:04.3333 (4 laps)

Fastest lap
- Driver: (Brazil) Tony Kanaan ( (United States) Andretti Green Racing)
- Time: 16.9369 (on lap 234 of 300)

Podium
- First: (Brazil) Tony Kanaan ( (United States) Andretti Green Racing)
- Second: (Brazil) Hélio Castroneves ( (United States) Penske Racing)
- Third: (New Zealand) Scott Dixon ( (United States) Chip Ganassi Racing)

The 2008 SunTrust Indy Challenge was the ninth round of the 2008 IndyCar Series season and took place on June 28, 2008 at the 0.750-mile (1.207 km) Richmond International Raceway, in Henrico County, Virginia. At the start, Ryan Hunter-Reay spun just before the start/finish line, which brought the yellow out immediately. The first 7 laps were run under yellow with Tony Kanaan leading from the pole position. On lap 8, the green came out, but only one lap was completed before the next yellow. Will Power was driving below Hélio Castroneves, lost control, and crashed in turn 4. The race finally got going on lap 21, when the green came out once again. On lap 31, A. J. Foyt IV touched wheels with John Andretti, and Foyt crashed in the wall in turn 2. His Vision Racing teammate Ed Carpenter ran over debris from the crash, and both cars were sidelined. During the caution, a handful of cars pitted, including Danica Patrick and rookie Jaime Camara, but most of the leaders stayed on the track.

Kanaan continued to lead when debris brought out the caution again on lap 67. All of the leaders pitted, while Camara and Patrick stayed out and took the first two spots. On the restart, Camara led the field, but Buddy Rice spun and tagged the wall on the frontstretch. The field checked up, and Darren Manning, Ryan Briscoe and Bruno Junqueira were involved in a separate crash. Camara led at the next restart, while Kanaan, Patrick, and Castroneves went 3-wide for second. Behind them in turn 2, John Andretti and Vítor Meira tangled, and crashed hard in the wall. Patrick returned to the pits, and topped off with fuel. Camara continued to lead, and impressively held off Kanaan on the restart. On lap 116, Marco Andretti caught up to Camara, and took the lead for the first time.

Graham Rahal crashed on lap 133 in turn 4. Many of the leaders pitted, but Marco Andretti stayed out to lead. Another restart saw only three green laps, as yet another crash occurred, this time involving Hunter-Reay and Mario Moraes. Around this time, some teams anticipated that rain might end the race early. Marco Andretti gave up the lead on lap 204 when he made his final pit stop. That put Kanaan back into the lead. On lap 217, after a brilliant run in the top five, Camara lost control and crashed on the frontstretch. The yellow trapped Andretti a lap down, and kept Kanaan in the lead after the final sequence of pits stops. The rain held off, and Kanaan led the rest of the way for his first victory of the season.

== Result ==
Finish	Car No.	Driver	Team	Laps	Time/Retired	Grid	Laps Led	Points
1	11	(Brazil) Tony Kanaan	Andretti Green Racing	300	2:04:05.5111	1	166	53
2	3	(Brazil) Hélio Castroneves	Penske Racing	300	+4.7691	18	0	40
3	9	(New Zealand) Scott Dixon	Chip Ganassi Racing	300	+6.6504	4	0	35
4	10	(United Kingdom) Dan Wheldon	Chip Ganassi Racing	300	+7.7270	6	0	32
5	5	(Spain) Oriol Servià (R)	KV Racing	300	+10.7701	10	0	30
6	7	(United States) Danica Patrick	Andretti Green Racing	300	+10.9198	14	0	28
7	02	(United Kingdom) Justin Wilson (R)	Newman/Haas/Lanigan Racing	300	+16.3094	23	0	26
8	23	(United States) Townsend Bell	Dreyer & Reinbold Racing	300	+17.5175	21	0	24
9	26	(United States) Marco Andretti	Andretti Green Racing	299	+1 Lap	2	90	22
10	33	(Venezuela) E. J. Viso (R)	HVM Racing	298	+2 Laps	19	0	20
11	20	(United States) Ed Carpenter	Vision Racing	238	+62 Laps	13	0	19
12	14	(United Kingdom) Darren Manning	A. J. Foyt Enterprises	235	+65 Laps	22	0	18
13	27	(Japan) Hideki Mutoh (R)	Andretti Green Racing	220	Mechanical	7	0	17
14	34	(Brazil) Jaime Camara (R)	Conquest Racing	217	Contact	24	44	16
15	6	(Australia) Ryan Briscoe	Penske Racing	158	+142 Laps	11	0	15
16	17	(United States) Ryan Hunter-Reay (R)	Rahal Letterman Racing	143	Contact	25	0	14
17	19	(Brazil) Mario Moraes (R)	Dale Coyne Racing	143	Contact	20	0	13
18	06	(United States) Graham Rahal	Newman/Haas/Lanigan Racing	131	Contact	3	0	12
19	25	(Canada) Marty Roth	Roth Racing	117	Handling	15	0	12
20	4	(Brazil) Vítor Meira	Panther Racing	91	Contact	17	0	12
21	24	(United States) John Andretti	Roth Racing	91	Contact	12	0	12
22	15	(United States) Buddy Rice	Dreyer & Reinbold Racing	80	Contact	5	0	12
23	18	(Brazil) Bruno Junqueira	Dale Coyne Racing	78	Contact	9	0	12
24	2	(United States) A. J. Foyt IV	Vision Racing	29	Contact	8	0	12
25	8	(Australia) Will Power (R)	KV Racing	8	Contact	16	0	10
26	36	(Brazil) Enrique Bernoldi	Conquest Racing	6	Handling	26	0	10
Race average speed: 108.790 mph (175.081 km/h)
Lead changes: 3 between 3 drivers
Cautions: 9 for 102 laps

Preceded by 2008 Iowa Corn Indy 250	IRL IndyCar Series round 9; 2008	Succeeded by 2008 Camping World Indy Grand Prix at the Glen
