= 2008 Peak Antifreeze Indy 300 =

The layout of Chicagoland Speedway

The 2008 Peak Antifreeze & Motor Oil Indy 300 was the seventeenth and final showdown of the 2008 IndyCar Series season. It took place on September 7, 2008. It was the last points race of the year. It was held at Chicagoland Speedway in Joliet, Illinois. Dixon held on to win his second IndyCar championship.

== Race ==
| Pos | No | Driver | Team | Laps | Time/Retired | Grid | Laps Led | Points |
|---|---|---|---|---|---|---|---|---|
| 1 | 3 | (Brazil) Hélio Castroneves | Team Penske | 200 | 2:01:04.5907 | 28 | 80 | 50+3 |
| 2 | 9 | (New Zealand) Scott Dixon | Chip Ganassi Racing | 200 | +0.0033 | 2 | 14 | 40 |
| 3 | 6 | (Australia) Ryan Briscoe | Team Penske | 200 | +0.0811 | 1 | 41 | 35 |
| 4 | 11 | (Brazil) Tony Kanaan | Andretti Green Racing | 200 | +0.6128 | 4 | 47 | 32 |
| 5 | 8 | (Australia) Will Power (R) | KV Racing Technology | 200 | +1.3613 | 10 | 0 | 30 |
| 6 | 10 | (United Kingdom) Dan Wheldon | Chip Ganassi Racing | 200 | +1.8762 | 6 | 13 | 28 |
| 7 | 14 | (United Kingdom) Darren Manning | A. J. Foyt Racing | 200 | +2.3257 | 23 | 0 | 26 |
| 8 | 26 | (United States) Marco Andretti | Andretti Green Racing | 200 | +2.4660 | 5 | 0 | 24 |
| 9 | 17 | (United States) Ryan Hunter-Reay | Rahal Letterman Racing | 200 | +2.8026 | 16 | 0 | 22 |
| 10 | 7 | (United States) Danica Patrick | Andretti Green Racing | 200 | +2.9309 | 3 | 0 | 20 |
| 11 | 02 | (United Kingdom) Justin Wilson (R) | Newman/Haas/Lanigan Racing | 200 | +3.0251 | 21 | 0 | 19 |
| 12 | 36 | (Canada) Alex Tagliani | Conquest Racing | 200 | +4.2105 | 19 | 0 | 18 |
| 13 | 2 | (United States) A. J. Foyt IV | Vision Racing | 199 | +1 Lap | 15 | 0 | 17 |
| 14 | 23 | (Venezuela) Milka Duno | Dreyer & Reinbold Racing | 199 | +1 Lap | 20 | 5 | 16 |
| 15 | 41 | (France) Franck Perera (R) | A. J. Foyt Racing | 198 | +2 Laps | 24 | 0 | 15 |
| 16 | 25 | (Canada) Marty Roth | Roth Racing | 197 | +3 Laps | 9 | 0 | 14 |
| 17 | 5 | (Spain) Oriol Servià | KV Racing Technology | 196 | +4 Laps | 12 | 0 | 13 |
| 18 | 34 | (Brazil) Jaime Camara (R) | Conquest Racing | 187 | +13 Laps | 17 | 0 | 12 |
| 19 | 06 | (United States) Graham Rahal (R) | Newman/Haas/Lanigan Racing | 186 | Contact | 14 | 0 | 12 |
| 20 | 18 | (Brazil) Bruno Junqueira | Dale Coyne Racing | 184 | +16 Laps | 25 | 0 | 12 |
| 21 | 19 | (Brazil) Mario Moraes (R) | Dale Coyne Racing | 181 | Contact | 27 | 0 | 12 |
| 22 | 27 | (Japan) Hideki Mutoh (R) | Andretti Green Racing | 177 | +23 Laps | 11 | 0 | 12 |
| 23 | 33 | (Venezuela) E. J. Viso | HVM Racing | 136 | Contact | 26 | 0 | 12 |
| 24 | 67 | (United States) Sarah Fisher | Sarah Fisher Racing | 116 | Contact | 18 | 0 | 12 |
| 25 | 15 | (United States) Buddy Rice | Dreyer & Reinbold Racing | 110 | Contact | 22 | 0 | 10 |
| 26 | 12 | (South Africa) Tomas Scheckter | Luczo Dragon Racing | 87 | Mechanical | 7 | 0 | 10 |
| 27 | 4 | (Brazil) Vítor Meira | Panther Racing | 74 | Contact | 8 | 0 | 10 |
| 28 | 20 | (United States) Ed Carpenter | Vision Racing | 36 | Contact | 13 | 0 | 10 |

| Preceded by 2008 Detroit Indy Grand Prix | IRL IndyCar Series round 17; 2008 | Succeeded by 2008 Nikon Indy 300 |
