= 2008 ABC Supply Company A.J. Foyt 225 =

(United States) 2008 Milwaukee
Race details
- 6th round of the 2008 IndyCar Series season
- Date: June 1, 2008
- Official name: ABC Supply Company A.J. Foyt 225
- Location: Milwaukee Mile
- Course: Permanent racing facility 1.000 mi / 1.609 km
- Distance: 225 laps 225 mi / 362.102 km
- Weather: Temperatures reaching up to 71.6 °F (22.0 °C); wind speeds approaching 9.9 miles per hour (15.9 km/h)

Pole position
- Driver: (United States) Marco Andretti (Andretti Green Racing)
- Time: 1:26.9591 (4 laps)

Fastest lap
- Driver: (New Zealand) Scott Dixon (Chip Ganassi Racing)
- Time: 22.2185 (on lap 76 of 225)

Podium
- First: (Australia) Ryan Briscoe (Penske Racing)
- Second: (New Zealand) Scott Dixon (Chip Ganassi Racing)
- Third: (Brazil) Tony Kanaan (Andretti Green Racing)

Chronology
Previous	Next
2007	2009

The 2008 ABC Supply Company A.J. Foyt 225 was the sixth round of the 2008 IndyCar Series season and took place on June 1, 2008 at the 1.015-mile (1.633 km) Milwaukee Mile, in West Allis, Wisconsin. Marco Andretti took the lead from the pole position, and led the first 40 laps. He was chased early by Scott Dixon and teammate Tony Kanaan. Graham Rahal, who started on the outside of the front row, shuffled back, but remained in the top 5 for the first half of the race. The first half was mostly green, with only a minor caution involving Oriol Servià and another for debris. Later in the first fuel segment, Andretti's handling started to suffer, and Dixon took over the lead. Hélio Castroneves took over second, and Andretti fell back as deep as tenth.

On lap 130, Rahal went high in turn three to pass Darren Manning. He got into the marbles, and brushed along the wall in turn four. After holding the lead for 136 laps, Dixon was finally challenged by Ryan Briscoe. Briscoe took over the lead on lap 177, and held it until a green flag pit stop on lap 194. After a sequence of pit stops, Castroneves, Andretti and Dan Wheldon all cycled near the front. When all pit stops were complete, Briscoe held a half-second lead over Dixon. The two battled for the lead over the final 21 laps.

With less than three laps to go, Andretti dove underneath Ed Carpenter in turn one. The cars touched, and both cars spun into the wall. Vítor Meira became caught up in the smoke, and rode up over Andretti, becoming airborne. He landed upright, and all drivers were uninjured. The race finished under caution with Briscoe picking up his first career IndyCar victory, and 300th overall win for the Mooresville, North Carolina–based Penske Racing in all motorsports series.

== Result ==
Finish	Car No.	Driver	Team	Laps	Time/Retired	Grid	Laps Led	Points
1	6	(Australia) Ryan Briscoe	Penske Racing	225	1:42:41.7387	11	36	50
2	9	(New Zealand) Scott Dixon	Chip Ganassi Racing	225	+0.0487	3	147	43
3	11	(Brazil) Tony Kanaan	Andretti Green Racing	225	+1.8413	6	0	35
4	10	(United Kingdom) Dan Wheldon	Chip Ganassi Racing	225	+2.9314	7	0	32
5	3	(Brazil) Hélio Castroneves	Penske Racing	225	+4.6704	5	2	30
6	5	(Spain) Oriol Servià (R)	KV Racing	225	+14.2217	9	0	28
7	02	(United Kingdom) Justin Wilson (R)	Newman/Haas/Lanigan Racing	224	+1 Lap	22	0	26
8	33	(Venezuela) E. J. Viso (R)	HVM Racing	224	+1 Lap	10	0	24
9	7	(United States) Danica Patrick	Andretti Green Racing	224	+1 Lap	13	0	22
10	15	(United States) Buddy Rice	Dreyer & Reinbold Racing	224	+1 Lap	19	0	20
11	23	(United States) Townsend Bell	Dreyer & Reinbold Racing	224	+1 Lap	21	0	19
12	27	(Japan) Hideki Mutoh (R)	Andretti Green Racing	224	+1 Lap	14	0	18
13	14	(United Kingdom) Darren Manning	A. J. Foyt Enterprises	223	+2 Laps	20	0	17
14	8	(Australia) Will Power (R)	KV Racing	223	+2 Laps	4	16	16
15	17	(United States) Ryan Hunter-Reay (R)	Rahal Letterman Racing	223	+2 Laps	12	0	15
16	36	(Brazil) Enrique Bernoldi	Conquest Racing	222	+3 Laps	8	0	14
17	2	(United States) A. J. Foyt IV	Vision Racing	222	+3 Laps	18	0	13
18	18	(Brazil) Bruno Junqueira	Dale Coyne Racing	222	+3 Laps	15	0	12
19	24	(United States) John Andretti	Roth Racing	222	+3 Laps	16	0	12
20	20	(United States) Ed Carpenter	Vision Racing	221	Contact	17	0	12
21	26	(United States) Marco Andretti	Andretti Green Racing	221	Contact	1	40	12
22	4	(Brazil) Vítor Meira	Panther Racing	220	Contact	26	0	12
23	19	(Brazil) Mario Moraes (R)	Dale Coyne Racing	218	+7 Laps	23	0	12
24	34	(Brazil) Jaime Camara (R)	Conquest Racing	218	+7 Laps	24	0	12
25	06	(United States) Graham Rahal	Newman/Haas/Lanigan Racing	129	Contact	2	0	12
26	96	(Mexico) Mario Domínguez (R)	Pacific Coast Motorsports	107	Handling	25	0	12
27	25	(Canada) Marty Roth	Roth Racing	0	DNS	-	0	5
Race average speed: 133.428 mph (214.732 km/h)
Lead changes: 5 between 4 drivers
Cautions: 4 for 29 laps
