= 2008 Firestone Indy 200 =

Track map of Nashville Superspeedway

The 2008 Firestone Indy 200 was the eleventh round of the 2008 IndyCar Series season. It took place on July 12, 2008, at the Nashville Superspeedway. It was the eighth edition of the Music City Grand Prix, and the last Nashville-area IndyCar race on the oval until 2024. Scott Dixon won the race.

== Race results ==
Pos	No.	Driver	Team	Laps	Time/Retired	Grid	Laps Led	Points
1	9	(New Zealand) Scott Dixon	Chip Ganassi Racing	171	1:30:04.6499	5	53	50
2	10	(United Kingdom) Dan Wheldon	Chip Ganassi Racing	171	+1.0680	6	0	40
3	3	(Brazil) Hélio Castroneves	Team Penske	171	+4.1054	1	54	35
4	11	(Brazil) Tony Kanaan	Andretti Green Racing	171	+6.4612	7	59	35
5	7	(United States) Danica Patrick	Andretti Green Racing	171	+7.8301	2	0	30
6	4	(Brazil) Vítor Meira	Panther Racing	171	+9.5615	15	0	28
7	15	(United States) Buddy Rice	Dreyer & Reinbold Racing	171	+13.2509	12	0	26
8	20	(United States) Ed Carpenter	Vision Racing	171	+16.0567	8	0	24
9	14	(United Kingdom) Darren Manning	A. J. Foyt Racing	171	+24.9236	18	0	22
10	19	(Brazil) Mario Moraes (R)	Dale Coyne Racing	170	+1 Lap	20	0	20
11	8	(Australia) Will Power (R)	KV Racing Technology	170	+1 Lap	14	0	19
12	06	(United States) Graham Rahal (R)	Newman/Haas/Lanigan Racing	170	+1 Lap	10	0	18
13	25	(Canada) Marty Roth	Roth Racing	170	+1 Lap	21	0	17
14	27	(Japan) Hideki Mutoh (R)	Andretti Green Racing	169	+2 Laps	3	0	16
15	18	(Brazil) Bruno Junqueira	Dale Coyne Racing	169	+2 Laps	22	0	15
16	5	(Spain) Oriol Servia	KV Racing Technology	169	+2 Laps	17	5	14
17	23	(Venezuela) Milka Duno	Dreyer & Reinbold Racing	168	+3 Laps	16	0	13
18	02	(United Kingdom) Justin Wilson (R)	Newman/Haas/Lanigan Racing	143	+28 Laps	13	0	12
19	17	(United States) Ryan Hunter-Reay (R)	Rahal Letterman Racing	99	Crash	4	0	12
20	36	(Brazil) Enrique Bernoldi (R)	Conquest Racing	66	Handling	19	0	12
21	34	(Brazil) Jaime Camara (R)	Conquest Racing	50	Handling	23	0	12
22	2	(United States) A. J. Foyt IV	Vision Racing	45	Steering	24	0	12
23	6	(Australia) Ryan Briscoe	Team Penske	3	Crash	9	0	12
24	26	(United States) Marco Andretti	Andretti Green Racing	2	Crash	11	0	12
Race average speed: 148.072 mph (238.299 km/h)
Lead changes: 5 between 4 drivers
Cautions: 4 for 37 laps
