= 2008 Bombardier Learjet 550 =

(United States) 2008 Texas
Race details
- 7th round of the 2008 IndyCar Series season
- Date: June 7, 2008
- Official name: Bombardier Learjet 550
- Location: Texas Motor Speedway
- Course: Permanent racing facility 1.455 mi / 2.342 km
- Distance: 228 laps 331.740 mi / 533.884 km

Pole position
- Driver: (New Zealand) Scott Dixon ( (United States) Chip Ganassi Racing)
- Time: 1:37.5063 (4 laps)

Fastest lap
- Driver: (United Kingdom) Dan Wheldon ( (United States) Chip Ganassi Racing)
- Time: 24.2418 (on lap 19 of 228)

Podium
- First: (New Zealand) Scott Dixon ( (United States) Chip Ganassi Racing)
- Second: (Brazil) Hélio Castroneves ( (United States) Penske Racing)
- Third: (Australia) Ryan Briscoe ( (United States) Penske Racing)

The 2008 Bombardier Learjet 550 was the seventh round of the 2008 IndyCar Series season and took place on June 7, 2008 at the 1.455-mile (2.342 km) Texas Motor Speedway, in Fort Worth, Texas. In the first half, three single-car incidents involving Mario Domínguez, Justin Wilson, and Oriol Servià slowed the race. The lead changed hands between Hélio Castroneves, Bruno Junqueira, and Scott Dixon for the first 100 laps. Two sequences of green flag pit stops occurred under a long stretch of green flag conditions. A caution for debris came out on lap 165, sending the leaders to the pits once more. Vítor Meira stayed out to take over the lead.

With 21 laps to go, Meira was forced to pit for fuel, giving up the lead to Marco Andretti. Moments later, Enrique Bernoldi crashed in turn four. Andretti led the field back to green on lap 219. With six laps to go, Dixon slipped by Andretti to take the lead. On the next lap, down the backstretch, third place Ryan Hunter-Reay dove below Andretti heading into turn three. Hunter-Reay pinched his left wheels onto the apron, lost control, and touched wheels with Andretti. Both cars spun and crashed hard into the wall. The race finished under caution with Dixon the winner, and Castroneves slipping by the accident to finish second.

== Result ==
Finish	Car No.	Driver	Team	Laps	Time/Retired	Grid	Laps Led	Points
1	9	(New Zealand) Scott Dixon	Chip Ganassi Racing	228	2:04:36.3153	1	58	50
2	3	(Brazil) Hélio Castroneves	Penske Racing	228	+0.0479	2	85	43
3	6	(Australia) Ryan Briscoe	Penske Racing	228	+0.6173	3	12	35
4	10	(United Kingdom) Dan Wheldon	Chip Ganassi Racing	228	+3.3000	11	0	32
5	11	(Brazil) Tony Kanaan	Andretti Green Racing	228	+4.3124	13	0	30
6	27	(Japan) Hideki Mutoh (R)	Andretti Green Racing	228	+5.0571	4	0	28
7	4	(Brazil) Vítor Meira	Panther Racing	227	+1 Lap	9	38	26
8	15	(United States) Buddy Rice	Dreyer & Reinbold Racing	227	+1 Lap	25	0	24
9	20	(United States) Ed Carpenter	Vision Racing	227	+1 Lap	12	0	22
10	7	(United States) Danica Patrick	Andretti Green Racing	227	+1 Lap	5	0	20
11	06	(United States) Graham Rahal	Newman/Haas/Lanigan Racing	227	+1 Lap	18	0	19
12	2	(United States) A. J. Foyt IV	Vision Racing	226	+2 Laps	15	0	18
13	8	(Australia) Will Power (R)	KV Racing	226	+2 Laps	8	0	17
14	33	(Venezuela) E. J. Viso (R)	HVM Racing	226	+2 Laps	28	0	16
15	18	(Brazil) Bruno Junqueira	Dale Coyne Racing	226	+2 Laps	26	10	15
16	24	(United States) John Andretti	Roth Racing	226	+2 Laps	7	0	14
17	23	(Venezuela) Milka Duno	Dreyer & Reinbold Racing	226	+2 Laps	27	0	13
18	19	(Brazil) Mario Moraes (R)	Dale Coyne Racing	223	+5 Laps	22	0	12
19	26	(United States) Marco Andretti	Andretti Green Racing	222	Contact	14	25	12
20	17	(United States) Ryan Hunter-Reay	Rahal Letterman Racing	222	Contact	10	0	12
21	96	(Mexico) Mario Domínguez (R)	Pacific Coast Motorsports	222	+6 Laps	24	0	12
22	25	(Canada) Marty Roth	Roth Racing	221	+7 Laps	19	0	12
23	36	(Brazil) Enrique Bernoldi	Conquest Racing	210	Contact	20	0	12
24	34	(Brazil) Jaime Camara (R)	Conquest Racing	210	+18 Laps	21	0	12
25	12	(South Africa) Tomas Scheckter	Luczo Dragon Racing	56	Contact	6	0	10
26	5	(Spain) Oriol Servià (R)	KV Racing	47	Contact	16	0	10
27	02	(United Kingdom) Justin Wilson (R)	Newman/Haas/Lanigan Racing	39	Contact	23	0	10
28	14	(United Kingdom) Darren Manning	A. J. Foyt Enterprises	19	Mechanical	17	0	10
Race average speed: 159.740 mph (257.077 km/h)
Lead changes: 21 between 6 drivers
Cautions: 8 for 52 laps
