= 2010 Indy Japan 300 =

Race details
- 16th round of the 2010 IndyCar Series season
- Date: September 19, 2010
- Official name: Indy Japan 300
- Location: Twin Ring Motegi
- Course: Permanent racing facility 1.520 mi / 2.446 km
- Distance: 200 laps 304.000 mi / 489.200 km
- Weather: 83 °F (28 °C), partly cloudy

Pole position
- Driver: (Brazil) Hélio Castroneves (Team Penske)
- Time: 54.1803 (2-lap)

Fastest lap
- Driver: (Brazil) Hélio Castroneves (Team Penske)
- Time: 27.3743 (on lap 13 of 200)

Podium
- First: (Brazil) Hélio Castroneves (Team Penske)
- Second: (United Kingdom) Dario Franchitti (Target Chip Ganassi Racing)
- Third: (Australia) Will Power (Team Penske)

The 2010 Indy Japan 300 was the 16th round of the 2010 IndyCar Series season and the eighth running of the event. It took place on Sunday September 19, 2010. The race was contested over 200 laps at the 1.520-mile (2.446 km) Twin Ring Motegi in Motegi, Tochigi, Japan. This was the last race to be contested by Indy Cars at the Twin Ring Motegi oval circuit as they switched to the road course for the last race in 2011.

== Classification ==
=== Qualifying ===
Pos	No.	Driver	Team	Lap 1	Lap 2	Total
1	3	(Brazil) Hélio Castroneves	Team Penske	27.0967	27.0836	54.1803
2	6	(Australia) Ryan Briscoe	Team Penske	27.2124	27.0749	54.2873
3	12	(Australia) Will Power	Team Penske	27.2070	27.1156	54.3226
4	10	(United Kingdom) Dario Franchitti	Chip Ganassi Racing	27.2927	27.1647	54.4574
5	26	(United States) Marco Andretti	Andretti Autosport	27.3856	27.2833	54.6689
6	11	(Brazil) Tony Kanaan	Andretti Autosport	27.4408	27.2761	54.7169
7	37	(United States) Ryan Hunter-Reay	Andretti Autosport	27.4661	27.3572	54.8233
8	8	(Venezuela) E. J. Viso	KV Racing Technology	27.4861	27.3745	54.8606
9	4	(United Kingdom) Dan Wheldon	Panther Racing	27.5240	27.4089	54.9329
10	5	(Japan) Takuma Sato (R)	KV Racing Technology	27.5113	27.4310	54.9423
11	9	(New Zealand) Scott Dixon	Chip Ganassi Racing	27.5421	27.4473	54.9894
12	7	(United States) Danica Patrick	Andretti Autosport	27.5479	27.4651	55.0130
13	34	(Belgium) Bertrand Baguette (R)	Conquest Racing	27.5855	27.4665	55.0520
14	14	(Brazil) Vítor Meira	A. J. Foyt Enterprises	27.7264	27.5603	55.2867
15	19	(United Kingdom) Alex Lloyd (R)	Dale Coyne Racing	27.7669	27.6300	55.3969
16	02	(United States) Graham Rahal	Newman/Haas Racing	27.6645	27.7758	55.4403
17	06	(Japan) Hideki Mutoh	Newman/Haas Racing	27.7581	27.6936	55.4517
18	22	(United Kingdom) Justin Wilson	Dreyer & Reinbold Racing	27.8717	27.7239	55.5956
19	2	(Brazil) Raphael Matos	de Ferran Dragon Racing	27.8230	27.7831	55.6061
20	32	(Brazil) Mario Moraes	KV Racing Technology	27.9632	27.7428	55.7060
21	36	(United States) Roger Yasukawa	Conquest Racing	28.0284	27.7240	55.7524
22	24	(Canada) Paul Tracy	Dreyer & Reinbold Racing	27.9825	27.9373	55.9198
23	77	(Canada) Alex Tagliani	FAZZT Race Team	28.0054	27.9790	55.9844
24	78	(Switzerland) Simona de Silvestro (R)	HVM Racing	28.2856	28.2527	56.5403
25	18	(Venezuela) Milka Duno	Dale Coyne Racing	28.5368	28.3071	56.8439
OFFICIAL QUALIFICATIONS REPORT

=== Race ===
Pos	No.	Driver	Team	Laps	Time/Retired	Points
1	3	(Brazil) Hélio Castroneves	Team Penske	200	2:04:04.4780	53
2	10	(United Kingdom) Dario Franchitti	Chip Ganassi Racing	200	2:04:09.0526	40
3	12	(Australia) Will Power	Team Penske	200	2:04:09.5523	35
4	6	(Australia) Ryan Briscoe	Team Penske	200	2:04:10.9605	32
5	7	(United States) Danica Patrick	Andretti Autosport	200	2:04:12.0837	30
6	9	(New Zealand) Scott Dixon	Chip Ganassi Racing	200	2:04:12.8421	28
7	11	(Brazil) Tony Kanaan	Andretti Autosport	200	2:04:13.8873	26
8	02	(United States) Graham Rahal	Newman/Haas Racing	200	2:04:16.1943	24
9	37	(United States) Ryan Hunter-Reay	Andretti Autosport	200	2:04:16.6905	22
10	4	(United Kingdom) Dan Wheldon	Panther Racing	200	2:04:16.9500	20
11	26	(United States) Marco Andretti	Andretti Autosport	200	2:04:19.9787	19
12	5	(Japan) Takuma Sato (R)	KV Racing Technology	200	2:04:20.5473	18
13	77	(Canada) Alex Tagliani	FAZZT Race Team	200	2:04:22.1554	17
14	06	(Japan) Hideki Mutoh	Newman/Haas Racing	200	2:04:22.7591	16
15	8	(Venezuela) E. J. Viso	KV Racing Technology	200	2:04:23.2129	15
16	22	(United Kingdom) Justin Wilson	Dreyer & Reinbold Racing	200	2:04:23.9073	14
17	14	(Brazil) Vítor Meira	A. J. Foyt Enterprises	200	2:04:24.5827	13
18	2	(Brazil) Raphael Matos	de Ferran Dragon Racing	200	2:04:25.7126	12
19	18	(Venezuela) Milka Duno	Dale Coyne Racing	197	+3 laps	12
20	36	(United States) Roger Yasukawa	Conquest Racing	195	+5 laps	12
21	19	(United Kingdom) Alex Lloyd (R)	Dale Coyne Racing	131	Contact	12
22	24	(Canada) Paul Tracy	Dreyer & Reinbold Racing	114	Contact	12
23	78	(Switzerland) Simona de Silvestro (R)	HVM Racing	85	Mechanical	12
24	32	(Brazil) Mario Moraes	KV Racing Technology	66	Contact	12
25	34	(Belgium) Bertrand Baguette (R)	Conquest Racing	1	Contact	10
OFFICIAL RACE REPORT

Previous race: 2010 Kentucky Indy 300	IZOD IndyCar Series; 2010 season	Next race: 2010 Cafés do Brasil Indy 300
Previous race: 2009 Indy Japan 300	2010 Indy Japan 300	Next race: 2011 Indy Japan: The Final
