= 2010 Peak Antifreeze & Motor Oil Indy 300 =

(United States) 2010 Peak Antifreeze & Motor Oil Indy 300
Race details
- 14th round of the 2010 IndyCar Series season
- Date: August 28, 2010
- Official name: Peak Antifreeze & Motor Oil Indy 300
- Location: Chicagoland Speedway
- Course: Permanent racing facility 1.520 mi / 2.446 km
- Distance: 200 laps 304.000 mi / 489.241 km
- Weather: 86 °F (30 °C), clear skies

Pole position
- Driver: (Australia) Ryan Briscoe (Team Penske)
- Time: 50.5857 (2-lap)

Fastest lap
- Driver: (New Zealand) Scott Dixon (Chip Ganassi Racing)
- Time: 25.0486 (on lap 4 of 200)

Podium
- First: (United Kingdom) Dario Franchitti (Chip Ganassi Racing)
- Second: (United Kingdom) Dan Wheldon (Panther Racing)
- Third: (United States) Marco Andretti (Andretti Autosport)

The 2010 Peak Antifreeze & Motor Oil Indy 300 was the fourteenth round of the 2010 IndyCar Series season. It took place on Saturday, August 28, 2010. The race contested over 200 laps at the 1.520-mile (2.446 km) Chicagoland Speedway in Joliet, Illinois.

This would be the final IndyCar race contested at Chicagoland.

== Classification ==
=== Qualifying ===
Pos	No.	Driver	Team	Lap 1	Lap 2	Total
1	6	(Australia) Ryan Briscoe	Team Penske	25.2945	25.2912	50.5857
2	10	(United Kingdom) Dario Franchitti	Chip Ganassi Racing	25.3997	25.3627	50.7624
3	12	(Australia) Will Power	Team Penske	25.3731	25.4061	50.7792
4	3	(Brazil) Hélio Castroneves	Team Penske	25.4085	25.3817	50.7902
5	26	(United States) Marco Andretti	Andretti Autosport	25.4063	25.4202	50.8265
6	02	(United States) Graham Rahal	Newman/Haas Racing	25.4148	25.4133	50.8281
7	4	(United Kingdom) Dan Wheldon	Panther Racing	25.4398	25.4391	50.8789
8	06	(Japan) Hideki Mutoh	Newman/Haas Racing	25.4511	25.4381	50.8892
9	37	(United States) Ryan Hunter-Reay	Andretti Autosport	25.4585	25.4489	50.9074
10	5	(Japan) Takuma Sato (R)	KV Racing Technology	25.4780	25.4374	50.9154
11	20	(United States) Ed Carpenter	Panther Racing	25.4883	25.4540	50.9423
12	7	(United States) Danica Patrick	Andretti Autosport	25.5090	25.4526	50.9616
13	11	(Brazil) Tony Kanaan	Andretti Autosport	25.5123	25.4773	50.9896
14	19	(United Kingdom) Alex Lloyd (R)	Dale Coyne Racing	25.5235	25.5050	51.0285
15	9	(New Zealand) Scott Dixon	Chip Ganassi Racing	25.5430	17.5331	51.0761
16	8	(Venezuela) E. J. Viso	KV Racing Technology	25.5454	25.5447	51.0901
17	36	(South Africa) Tomas Scheckter	Conquest Racing	25.5749	25.5430	51.1179
18	2	(Brazil) Raphael Matos	de Ferran Dragon Racing	25.5667	25.5795	51.1462
19	77	(Canada) Alex Tagliani	FAZZT Race Team	25.5983	25.5634	51.1617
20	34	(Belgium) Bertrand Baguette (R)	Conquest Racing	25.6104	25.6058	51.2162
21	32	(Brazil) Mario Moraes	KV Racing Technology	25.6085	25.6615	51.2700
22	24	(Brazil) Ana Beatriz (R)	Dreyer & Reinbold Racing	25.6389	25.6381	51.2770
23	22	(United Kingdom) Justin Wilson	Dreyer & Reinbold Racing	25.6405	25.6470	51.2875
24	14	(Brazil) Vítor Meira	A. J. Foyt Enterprises	25.6796	25.6751	51.3547
25	67	(United States) Sarah Fisher	Sarah Fisher Racing	25.6733	25.6840	51.3573
26	18	(Venezuela) Milka Duno	Dale Coyne Racing	25.7110	25.7232	51.4342
27	78	(Switzerland) Simona de Silvestro (R)	HVM Racing	25.7199	25.7426	51.4625
28	21	(United States) Davey Hamilton	de Ferran Dragon Racing	25.7617	25.7434	51.5051
29	66	(United Kingdom) Jay Howard (R)	Sarah Fisher Racing	25.8043	25.7948	51.5991
OFFICIAL QUALIFICATIONS REPORT

=== Race ===
Pos	No.	Driver	Team	Laps	Time/Retired	Points
1	10	(United Kingdom) Dario Franchitti	Chip Ganassi Racing	200	1:47:49.5783	50
2	4	(United Kingdom) Dan Wheldon	Panther Racing	200	1:47:49.6206	40
3	26	(United States) Marco Andretti	Andretti Autosport	200	1:47:49.6834	35
4	37	(United States) Ryan Hunter-Reay	Andretti Autosport	200	1:47:49.7414	32
5	11	(Brazil) Tony Kanaan	Andretti Autosport	200	1:47:49.9191	30
6	3	(Brazil) Hélio Castroneves	Team Penske	200	1:47:50.0651	28
7	22	(United Kingdom) Justin Wilson	Dreyer & Reinbold Racing	200	1:47:50.1736	26
8	9	(New Zealand) Scott Dixon	Chip Ganassi Racing	200	1:47:50.4920	24
9	14	(Brazil) Vítor Meira	A. J. Foyt Enterprises	200	1:47:50.5371	22
10	02	(United States) Graham Rahal	Newman/Haas Racing	200	1:47:50.5624	20
11	6	(Australia) Ryan Briscoe	Team Penske	200	1:47:50.5968	22
12	34	(Belgium) Bertrand Baguette (R)	Conquest Racing	200	1:47:50.6616	18
13	06	(Japan) Hideki Mutoh	Newman/Haas Racing	200	1:47:50.8825	17
14	7	(United States) Danica Patrick	Andretti Autosport	200	1:47:51.1441	16
15	67	(United States) Sarah Fisher	Sarah Fisher Racing	199	+1 lap	15
16	12	(Australia) Will Power	Team Penske	199	+1 lap	14
17	32	(Brazil) Mario Moraes	KV Racing Technology	199	+1 lap	13
18	21	(United States) Davey Hamilton	de Ferran Dragon Racing	199	+1 lap	12
19	18	(Venezuela) Milka Duno	Dale Coyne Racing	197	+3 laps	12
20	20	(United States) Ed Carpenter	Conquest Racing	179	Mechanical	12
21	19	(United Kingdom) Alex Lloyd (R)	de Ferran Dragon Racing	162	+38 laps	12
22	66	(United Kingdom) Jay Howard (R)	Sarah Fisher Racing	161	Mechanical	12
23	78	(Switzerland) Simona de Silvestro (R)	HVM Racing	150	Mechanical	12
24	24	(Brazil) Ana Beatriz (R)	Dreyer & Reinbold Racing	88	Mechanical	12
25	77	(Canada) Alex Tagliani	FAZZT Race Team	85	Contact	10
26	5	(Japan) Takuma Sato (R)	KV Racing Technology	80	Contact	10
27	8	(Venezuela) E. J. Viso	KV Racing Technology	80	Contact	10
28	36	(South Africa) Tomas Scheckter	Conquest Racing	4	Contact	10
29	2	(Brazil) Raphael Matos	de Ferran Dragon Racing	4	Contact	10
OFFICIAL RACE REPORT

Previous race: 2010 Indy Grand Prix of Sonoma	IndyCar Series; 2010 season	Next race: 2010 Kentucky Indy 300
Previous race: 2009 Peak Antifreeze & Motor Oil Indy 300	2010 Peak Antifreeze & Motor Oil Indy 300	Next race: N/A
