= 2010 Honda Indy Toronto =

(Canada) 2010 Honda Indy Toronto
Race details
- 10th round of the 2010 IndyCar Series season
- Date: July 18, 2010
- Official name: Honda Indy Toronto
- Location: Streets of Toronto
- Course: Temporary street circuit 1.755 mi / 2.824 km
- Distance: 85 laps 149.175 mi / 240.040 km
- Weather: Temperatures reaching up to 29.6 °C (85.3 °F); with temperatures dropping slightly to 22.9 °C (73.2 °F) by the end of the event

Pole position
- Driver: (United Kingdom) Justin Wilson (Dreyer & Reinbold Racing)
- Time: 1:00.2710

Fastest lap
- Driver: (Australia) Will Power (Team Penske)
- Time: 1:01.3934 (on lap 41 of 85)

Podium
- First: (Australia) Will Power (Team Penske)
- Second: (United Kingdom) Dario Franchitti (Chip Ganassi Racing)
- Third: (United States) Ryan Hunter-Reay (Andretti Autosport)

The 2010 Honda Indy Toronto was the second running of the Honda Indy Toronto (it had been conducted for 22 previous years under different sponsorship) and the tenth round of the 2010 IndyCar Series season. It took place on Sunday, July 18, 2010. The race was contested over 85 laps at the 1.755-mile (2.824 km) Exhibition Place in Toronto, Ontario.

== Classification ==
=== Qualifying ===
Pos	No.	Driver	Team	Group 1	Group 2	Top 12	Fast 6
1	22	(United Kingdom) Justin Wilson	Dreyer & Reinbold Racing	1:00.8228		1:00.5208	1:00.2710
2	12	(Australia) Will Power	Team Penske	1:00.7025		1:00.6534	1:00.4563
3	3	(Brazil) Hélio Castroneves	Team Penske	1:01.1016		1:00.5295	1:00.8159
4	37	(United States) Ryan Hunter-Reay	Andretti Autosport		1:01.2576	1:00.8496	1:00.8397
5	10	(United Kingdom) Dario Franchitti	Chip Ganassi Racing	1:00.8204		1:00.6404	1:00.9477
6	9	(New Zealand) Scott Dixon	Chip Ganassi Racing		1:01.2343	1:00.8340	1:00.9541
7	6	(Australia) Ryan Briscoe	Team Penske		1:01.2591	1:00.9141	
8	11	(Brazil) Tony Kanaan	Andretti Autosport	1:01.2795		1:00.9212	
9	77	(Canada) Alex Tagliani	FAZZT Race Team		1:01.4674	1:00.9996	
10	26	(United States) Marco Andretti	Andretti Autosport		1:01.3213	1:01.2297	
11	2	(Brazil) Raphael Matos	De Ferran Dragon Racing		1:01.5177	1:00.2820	
12	7	(United States) Danica Patrick	Andretti Autosport	1:01.1246		1:01.4580	
13	8	(Venezuela) E. J. Viso	KV Racing Technology	1:01.4087			
14	02	(United States) Graham Rahal	Newman/Haas Racing		1:01.7024		
15	4	(United Kingdom) Dan Wheldon	Panther Racing	1:01.6926			
16	36	(Belgium) Bertrand Baguette (R)	Conquest Racing		1:01.8072		
17	34	(Brazil) Mario Romancini (R)	Conquest Racing	1:01.9575			
18	5	(Japan) Takuma Sato (R)	KV Racing Technology		1:01.8130		
19	24	(South Africa) Tomas Scheckter	Dreyer & Reinbold Racing	1:02.0426			
20	32	(Brazil) Mario Moraes	KV Racing Technology		1:02.0953		
21	78	(Switzerland) Simona de Silvestro (R)	HVM Racing	1:02.0547			
22	06	(Japan) Hideki Mutoh	Newman/Haas Racing		1:02.1453		
23	19	(United Kingdom) Alex Lloyd	Dale Coyne Racing	1:02.6142			
24	15	(Canada) Paul Tracy	KV Racing Technology		1:02.5387		
25	18	(Venezuela) Milka Duno	Dale Coyne Racing	no time			
26	14	(Brazil) Vítor Meira	A. J. Foyt Enterprises		1:03.0741		

=== Race ===
Pos	No.	Driver	Team	Laps	Time/Retired	Points
1	12	(Australia) Will Power	Team Penske	85	1:47:15.2554	50
2	10	(United Kingdom) Dario Franchitti	Chip Ganassi Racing	85	1:47:16.5311	40
3	37	(United States) Ryan Hunter-Reay	Andretti Autosport	85	1:47:17.0159	35
4	11	(Brazil) Tony Kanaan	Andretti Autosport	85	1:47:18.7936	32
5	02	(United States) Graham Rahal	Newman/Haas Racing	85	1:47:24.9903	30
6	7	(United States) Danica Patrick	Andretti Autosport	85	1:47:27.1993	28
7	22	(United Kingdom) Justin Wilson	Dreyer & Reinbold Racing	85	1:47:27.6337	29
8	26	(United States) Marco Andretti	Andretti Autosport	85	1:47:31.5914	24
9	78	(Switzerland) Simona de Silvestro (R)	HVM Racing	85	1:47:36.7875	22
10	4	(United Kingdom) Dan Wheldon	Panther Racing	85	1:47:38.4091	20
11	14	(Brazil) Vítor Meira	A. J. Foyt Enterprises	85	1:47:41.1514	19
12	06	(Japan) Hideki Mutoh	Newman/Haas Racing	85	1:47:41.5432	18
13	15	(Canada) Paul Tracy	KV Racing Technology	84	+1 lap	17
14	32	(Brazil) Mario Moraes	KV Racing Technology	84	+1 lap	16
15	24	(South Africa) Tomas Scheckter	Dreyer & Reinbold Racing	84	+1 lap	15
16	36	(Belgium) Bertrand Baguette (R)	Conquest Racing	84	+1 lap	14
17	77	(Canada) Alex Tagliani	FAZZT Race Team	84	+1 lap	13
18	6	(Australia) Ryan Briscoe	Team Penske	83	+2 laps	12
19	8	(Venezuela) E. J. Viso	KV Racing Technology	82	+3 laps	12
20	9	(New Zealand) Scott Dixon	Chip Ganassi Racing	71	Contact	12
21	2	(Brazil) Raphael Matos	De Ferran Dragon Racing	64	Contact	12
22	34	(Brazil) Mario Romancini (R)	Conquest Racing	31	Contact	12
23	19	(United Kingdom) Alex Lloyd	Dale Coyne Racing	26	Contact	12
24	3	(Brazil) Hélio Castroneves	Team Penske	21	Contact	12
25	5	(Japan) Takuma Sato (R)	KV Racing Technology	15	Contact	10
26	18	(Venezuela) Milka Duno	Dale Coyne Racing	8	Handling	10
OFFICIAL RACE REPORT

Previous race: 2010 Camping World Grand Prix at The Glen	IndyCar Series; 2010 season	Next race: 2010 Honda Indy Edmonton
Previous race: 2009 Honda Indy Toronto	2010 Honda Indy Toronto	Next race: 2011 Honda Indy Toronto
