= 2010 IndyCar Series =

American auto racing season

2010 IndyCar season
- IZOD IndyCar Series

Season
- Races: 17
- Start date: March 14
- End date: October 2

Awards
- Drivers' champion: (United Kingdom) Dario Franchitti
- Rookie of the Year: (United Kingdom) Alex Lloyd
- Indianapolis 500 winner: (United Kingdom) Dario Franchitti

Discipline champions
- Oval champion: (United Kingdom) Dario Franchitti
- Road course champion: (Australia) Will Power

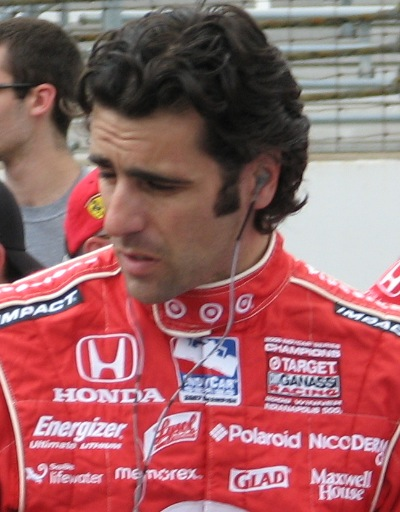
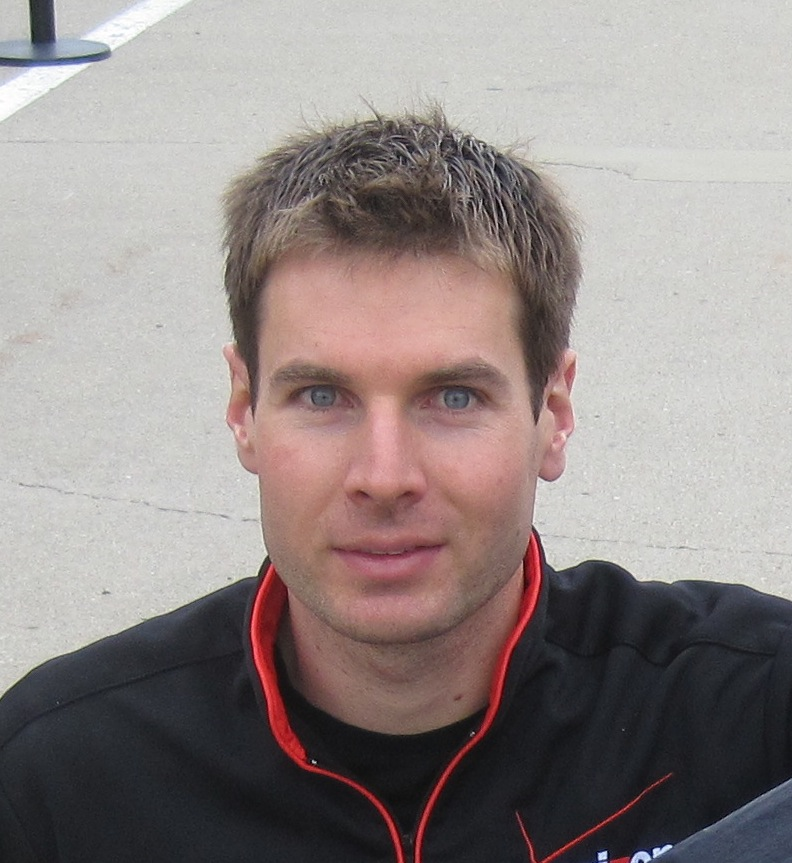
Dario Franchitti (left) won his third Drivers' Championship (second straight title) while Will Power (right) finished second in the championship.

The 2010 IZOD IndyCar Series was the 15th season of the IndyCar Series, and the 99th recognized season of top-level American open wheel racing. It was the series' first of six planned seasons under Izod title sponsorship, a multimillion-dollar deal which was announced on November 5, 2009. Its premier event was the 94th Indianapolis 500, held on Sunday, May 30.

This season is notable for having the most women to compete in a season: Ana Beatriz, Milka Duno, Sarah Fisher, Danica Patrick, and Simona de Silvestro. They all competed in the Peak Antifreeze & Motor Oil Indy 300 and the Cafés do Brasil Indy 300.

Chip Ganassi Racing's Dario Franchitti retained his title, to win his third in four seasons after defeating Team Penske driver Will Power in a championship battle that went to the final race of the season at Homestead-Miami Speedway. Power had led the championship for most of the season, and led Franchitti by twelve into Homestead, but after hitting the wall during the race and finishing in 25th place, Franchitti's eighth-place finish with maximum bonus points gave him the championship by five points. Franchitti and Power each won one of the new-for-2010 sub-championships for oval tracks, and road courses. Franchitti won the oval championship with six top-five finishes from eight races, including victories at the Indianapolis 500 and Chicagoland, and also won the road course event at Mid-Ohio. Power was even more dominant in the road course championship, finishing each of the nine races in the top three, with five wins in São Paulo, St. Petersburg, Watkins Glen, Toronto and Sonoma.

After battling Franchitti for the title in 2009, Scott Dixon and Ryan Briscoe finished third and fifth in the championship standings with the third Penske car, piloted by Hélio Castroneves finished between the pair. Dixon won on the ovals at Kansas and Homestead-Miami, as well as a victory in Edmonton after Castroneves was penalised for blocking on a late-race restart. Dixon's victory in Florida helped him overhaul Castroneves for third place in the championship standings. Castroneves also took three victories during the season, winning the inaugural race at Barber Motorsports Park as well as back-to-back victories at Kentucky and Twin Ring Motegi, as he finished sixteen points behind Dixon. Briscoe finished over 100 points behind Franchitti, with a solitary victory at Texas. Andretti Autosport drivers Tony Kanaan and Ryan Hunter-Reay were the only other drivers to win a race, as they finished sixth and seventh respectively. Rookie of the Year went to Dale Coyne Racing driver Alex Lloyd who competed in his first full season, after three races over the previous two seasons. He finished 24 points ahead of Simona de Silvestro.

This was the last season that the winner of the Indianapolis 500 went on to also win the championship in the same season until Álex Palou achieved the feat in 2025.

== Series news ==
- Announced in a press conference at Indianapolis Motor Speedway on November 5, 2009, clothier Izod signed on as the series' new title sponsor from 2010 to 2015, with an option for two additional years. According to Robin Miller, the deal was worth $10 million per year with at least $5 million toward promotions and marketing. It would additionally include a payout of $100,000 per car, per year to teams eligible for the TEAM revenue-sharing program, and possible partial funding for a full-time car for Ryan Hunter-Reay, whom received sponsorship backing from the brand in 2009. This was the third title sponsorship in the IndyCar Series' history; previous sponsorships were provided by Pep Boys (1998–1999) and Northern Light (2000–2001).
- On September 23, 2009, it was confirmed that Honda would extended their role as a series's standard single engine supplier contract for another two years that in place until the end of 2011 season.
- On November 25, 2009, a season opening race in São Paulo, Brazil was confirmed by city authorities and an Indy Racing League press release. The race, the São Paulo Indy 300, took place on a 2.3-mile (3.7 km) temporary street course. Despite the long travel distance for the teams, the event was lucrative with Terry Angstadt claiming each participating team would receive a six-figure sum from the event promoters in addition to all expenses paid.
- The possibility was left open for a race at Milwaukee, however, ongoing issues involving unpaid sanctioning fees from the management put the race, and the future of the facility, at risk. In November, Historic Mile, LLC. announced they were going out of business. It was announced on December 16 that no national racing series would race at the Milwaukee Mile in 2010 due to the inability for Wisconsin State Fair Park officials to find a replacement promoter for the season.
- The July 25 race in Edmonton went ahead, despite event organizers losing $9.2 million on the race over the previous two seasons.
- 2010 rule changes were announced on January 12, 2010. The 4-position fuel mixture switch was removed so that cars were only able to run on "full rich" or "yellow" fuel settings. The Honda Overtake assist returned with an approximate doubling of bhp increase from last year's 5–20 bhp upon pressing the button. All cars had a reverse gear on the road and street courses and thus reintroduced in 2010.
- IRL founder and IMS board member, Tony George, resigned from the IMS effective immediately on January 19, 2010.
- Former chief executive officer of the Professional Bull Riders, Randy Bernard, was announced as the new IRL CEO on February 2, 2010.
- A carriage dispute between the Comcast Corporation and its Versus channel, and DirecTV that had been in place since August was resolved on March 15, 2010. This meant that Versus was restored to nearly sixteen million customers; returning to coverage that the channel offered before the dispute.
- Indianapolis 500 qualifying in 2010 awarded points to each of the 33 qualifying drivers. The polesitter received fifteen points, with the other drivers on the front row receiving 13 and 12 respectively. Each qualifying driver earned at least three points.
- Two additional titles were awarded starting with the 2010 season, with an oval champion and a road/street course champion being crowned. A trophy and prize money was awarded to the highest points finisher on the 9 road/street courses and 7 oval races (excluding Homestead). After a fan vote, the names of the championships were announced as the A. J. Foyt Oval Championship and the Mario Andretti Road Course Championship.
- The development freeze introduced for the 2009 season remains in place for the 2010 and 2011 seasons.
- Sunoco would become the official fuel of the series starting in mid-2010 and running through 2018. Sunoco would work with APEX–Brasil and UNICA to provide ethanol for the series.

== Confirmed entries ==
All drivers competed in identical Honda HI10R V8-powered, Firestone Firehawk-shod, Dallara IR-05 chassis. (R) reflects an IZOD IndyCar Series rookie.

| Team | No. | Drivers | Rounds |
|---|---|---|---|
| A. J. Foyt Enterprises | 14 | (Brazil) Vítor Meira | All |
| A. J. Foyt Enterprises | 41 | (United States) A. J. Foyt IV | 6 |
| A. J. Foyt Enterprises | 41 | (United States) Jaques Lazier | 6 |
| Andretti Autosport | 7 | (United States) Danica Patrick | All |
| Andretti Autosport | 11 | (Brazil) Tony Kanaan | All |
| Andretti Autosport | 26 | (United States) Marco Andretti | All |
| Andretti Autosport | 27 | (United Kingdom) Adam Carroll R | 9, 12 |
| Andretti Autosport | 37 | (United States) Ryan Hunter-Reay | All |
| Andretti Autosport | 43 | (United States) John Andretti | 5–6 |
| Bryan Herta Autosport | 29 | (Colombia) Sebastián Saavedra R | 6 |
| Chip Ganassi Racing | 9 | (New Zealand) Scott Dixon | All |
| Chip Ganassi Racing | 10 | (United Kingdom) Dario Franchitti | All |
| Conquest Racing | 34 | (Brazil) Mario Romancini R | 1–11 |
| Conquest Racing | 34 | (Italy) Francesco Dracone R | 12 |
| Conquest Racing | 34 | (Belgium) Bertrand Baguette R | 13–17 |
| Conquest Racing | 36 | (Belgium) Bertrand Baguette R | 3–12 |
| Conquest Racing | 36 | (Italy) Francesco Dracone R | 13 |
| Conquest Racing | 36 | (South Africa) Tomas Scheckter | 14–15 |
| Conquest Racing | 36 | (United States) Roger Yasukawa | 16 |
| Conquest Racing | 36 | (Colombia) Sebastián Saavedra R | 17 |
| Dale Coyne Racing | 18 | (Venezuela) Milka Duno | All |
| Dale Coyne Racing | 19 | (United Kingdom) Alex Lloyd R | All |
| de Ferran Dragon Racing | 2 | (Brazil) Raphael Matos | All |
| de Ferran Dragon Racing | 21 | (United States) Davey Hamilton | 6, 14 |
| Dreyer & Reinbold Racing | 22 | (United Kingdom) Justin Wilson | All |
| Dreyer & Reinbold Racing | 23 | (Brazil) Ana Beatriz R | 1 |
| Dreyer & Reinbold Racing | 23 | (South Africa) Tomas Scheckter | 6 |
| Dreyer & Reinbold Racing | 24 | (United Kingdom) Mike Conway | 1–6 |
| Dreyer & Reinbold Racing | 24 | (United States) Graham Rahal | 8 |
| Dreyer & Reinbold Racing | 24 | (South Africa) Tomas Scheckter | 7, 10–11 |
| Dreyer & Reinbold Racing | 24 | (Canada) Paul Tracy | 9, 15–16 |
| Dreyer & Reinbold Racing | 24 | (United States) J. R. Hildebrand R | 12–13 |
| Dreyer & Reinbold Racing | 24 | (Brazil) Ana Beatriz R | 14, 17 |
| Dreyer & Reinbold Racing | 25 | (Brazil) Ana Beatriz R | 6 |
| FAZZT Race Team | 33 | (Brazil) Bruno Junqueira | 6 |
| FAZZT Race Team | 77 | (Canada) Alex Tagliani | All |
| HVM Racing | 78 | (Switzerland) Simona de Silvestro R | All |
| KV Racing Technology | 5 | (Japan) Takuma Sato R | All |
| KV Racing Technology | 8 | (Venezuela) E. J. Viso | All |
| KV Racing Technology | 15 | (Canada) Paul Tracy | 6, 10–11 |
| KV Racing Technology | 32 | (Brazil) Mario Moraes | All |
| Newman/Haas Racing; Newman/Haas/Lanigan Racing | 02 | (United States) Graham Rahal | 10, 12–14, 16–17 |
| Newman/Haas Racing; Newman/Haas/Lanigan Racing | 06 | (Japan) Hideki Mutoh | All |
| Panther Racing | 4 | (United Kingdom) Dan Wheldon | All |
| Panther Racing | 20 | (United States) Ed Carpenter | 6, 14–15, 17 |
| Rahal Letterman Racing | 30 | (United States) Graham Rahal | 6 |
| Sam Schmidt Motorsports | 99 | (United States) Townsend Bell | 6 |
| Sarah Fisher Racing | 66 | (United Kingdom) Jay Howard R | 5–7, 12, 14 |
| Sarah Fisher Racing | 66 | (United States) Graham Rahal | 15 |
| Sarah Fisher Racing | 67 | (United States) Graham Rahal | 2–4 |
| Sarah Fisher Racing | 67 | (United States) Sarah Fisher | 5–8, 14–15, 17 |
| Team Penske | 3 | (Brazil) Hélio Castroneves | All |
| Team Penske | 6 | (Australia) Ryan Briscoe | All |
| Team Penske | 12 | (Australia) Will Power | All |

=== Team and driver news ===
- Team Penske: Hélio Castroneves signed a multi-year contract extension with Penske Racing before the 2009 season. Penske ran three full-time teams in 2010, with Castroneves, Ryan Briscoe, and Will Power. Penske shut down their Grand-Am operation to make room for number #12 car. Two long-time Team Penske IndyCar Series team sponsors Philip Morris International including Marlboro brand and Hugo Boss including BOSS brand were ended their sponsorships after nineteen and twenty-three years respectively.
- Andretti Autosport: Before the 2010 season, the ownership of Andretti Green Racing split and began operating as Andretti Autosport. Co-owners Kim Green and Kevin Savoree owned the promotion side of AGR that stages the St. Pete and Toronto races, while the race team itself is fully owned by Michael Andretti. Tony Kanaan signed a multi-year deal before the 2009 season. Danica Patrick signed a three-year contract extension through 2012 with Go Daddy as primary sponsor. Venom Energy signed a multi-year deal to sponsor Marco Andretti. Ryan Hunter-Reay signed as the team's fourth driver, and drove the #37 machine, with primary sponsorship from series title sponsors, Izod. The team ran a fifth car at Kansas and the Indy 500, for John Andretti. Adam Carroll also contested a partial program with the team. beginning at Watkins Glen.
- Chip Ganassi Racing: Scott Dixon and Dario Franchitti returned for 2010. Developmental driver Alex Lloyd left the team to pursue other opportunities. E. J. Viso was working on a deal to join the team in a third car, but joined KV Racing Technology instead. Robin Miller reported Ganassi was looking to field a third car for Graham Rahal, but it did not materialize.
- Luczo Dragon Racing: Raphael Matos signed a multi-year contract before the 2009 season. On February 16, 2010, de Ferran Motorsports merged with the Luczo Dragon team to form de Ferran Luczo Dragon Racing. Davey Hamilton joined the team for Indianapolis and had been expected to run at Texas, and one other oval, in the #21 car with a partnership with Kingdom Racing. However, due to accidents suffered by both Matos and Hamilton at Indianapolis, Hamilton sat out Texas. Hamilton returned at Chicagoland.
- Panther Racing: Dan Wheldon returns for 2010. The team considered adding a second car if funding became available. 2008 GP2 Series champion Giorgio Pantano was in talks with the team.
- A. J. Foyt Enterprises: Vítor Meira returned from injury in 2009 to the #14 car for the 2010 season. The team entered a second car at Indianapolis for A. J. Foyt IV, but he was eventually replaced by Jaques Lazier.
- Conquest Racing: Conquest planned to run one car for the entire 2010 season in addition to a second car at selected events including the Indy 500. After talking with a few different potential drivers, including the team's former Champ Car driver, Jan Heylen of Belgium, Curt Cavin of The Indianapolis Star reported on December 11 that 2009 driver Nelson Philippe had split from the team since his season-ending crash last August at Infineon. Brazilian media outlets reported that Tomas Scheckter had signed for the team, as well as the possibility of running two more cars for a pair of Brazilian drivers. Brazilian journalist Victor Martins reported that Brazilian Mario Romancini had signed a full-season deal with the team, with the agreement confirmed on February 23. 2009 Formula Renault 3.5 Series champion Bertrand Baguette was confirmed by the team on March 22, 2010, beginning his season at the inaugural Indy Grand Prix of Alabama. Romancini was replaced by Francesco Dracone for Mid-Ohio and Sonoma, due to Romancini running into budgetary troubles.
- HVM Racing: Robert Doornbos had been signed for 2010 midway through the 2009 season, but Doornbos was released. E. J. Viso's contract with the team expired. Simona de Silvestro, third place in the 2009 Atlantic Championship, tested with HVM on December 8–9 at Sebring. She was later signed to be full-time driver for 2010.
- Newman/Haas Racing: 2009 driver Graham Rahal became a free agent, but had expected to re-sign with the team. Former driver Sébastien Bourdais had also been linked to rumors regarding the team. 2007 Indy Pro Series champion Alex Lloyd ran the final race of 2009 in the team's No. 40202 (usually the No. 06 but renumbered to promote a cancer research fund associated with Lloyd's sponsor) entry. He attempted to put together a sponsorship package to secure one of the team's seats for 2010. During the VERSUS television commentary on the final race of the 2009 season, it was stated that Alex Lloyd "had the seat for 2010" although there is not official announcement or citation. The Indianapolis Star reported on November 6 that Hideki Mutoh and sponsor Formula Dream was to join Rahal and Lloyd in 2010 at NHL, but neither HER Energy Drink nor McDonald's continued their sponsorships. Mutoh announced on his website that he had signed with the team on February 19, 2010, for a third year in the IndyCar Series. On March 24, 2010, Robin Miller reported that Rahal was likely to return to the team after his three-race deal with Sarah Fisher Racing, but the expected funding did not materialise until July.
- Newman Wachs Racing: Team owner Eddie Wachs said the team wanted to leave the Atlantic Championship and race in the IndyCar Series or GP2 Series in 2010. The team's driver would have been the 2009 Atlantic Championship and 2008 Star Mazda Championship winner John Edwards. The team intended to test Edwards in an IndyCar, but ultimately entered the Rolex Sports Car Series GT class with Edwards and Adam Christodoulou as drivers.
- Sarah Fisher Racing: SFR announced the addition of a second car at selected 2010 events. Fisher was scheduled for nine races (St. Pete., Barber, Kansas, Indy, Texas, Iowa, Chicagoland, Kentucky, Homestead). Jay Howard ran the #66 car at four races (Indy, Texas, Mid-Ohio, Chicagoland). On March 1, 2010, the TBC Retail Group announced they would sponsor Howard and the No. 66 Service Central car at Kansas Speedway. Graham Rahal drove Fisher's Dollar General entry at St. Pete, Barber and Long Beach while he was out of a ride.
- Vision Racing: Team owner Tony George had been hopeful of returning to a two-car team, with Ed Carpenter driving. However, it was announced on January 28, 2010, that Vision Racing had suspended operations due to a lack of sponsorship. The team appeared at Indianapolis only, in a partnership with Panther Racing with Carpenter driving.
- FAZZT Race Team: The new team owned by Montreal entrepreneur Andre Azzi, Jim Freudenberg, and Jason Priestley purchased all of the equipment of Roth Racing, including four Dallara chassis. They competed full-time in 2010 with driver Alex Tagliani, whom they signed to a four-year contract to drive the #77 car. Walker Racing veteran Rob Edwards was team manager. Tagliani was joined by Bruno Junqueira at the Indianapolis 500, who competed in the #33 car.
- Rahal Letterman Racing: Owner Bobby Rahal hoped to secure sponsorship to compete full-time in 2010. This did not occur, but the team entered Indianapolis with son Graham.
- Walker Racing: The team hoped to rejoin the IndyCar Series in 2010 if sponsorship was found, however the team lost longtime Team Manager Rob Edwards to the FAZZT Race Team.
- Dale Coyne Racing: The team was due to announce the driver for the #19 Boy Scouts of America entry by the end of January. Coyne announced during a January 11 teleconference with Versus lead announcer Bob Jenkins that he would run two cars in 2010; however, after Dreyer & Reinbold Racing signed Dale Coyne Racing's 2009 driver Justin Wilson with Wilson's Z-Line Designs driver sponsorship, it looked like Coyne would field just one entry full-time, but in an official press release, Coyne reiterated that the team's "drivers" would be announced soon and that Wilson's departure, while unfortunate, was not completely unexpected. In the same press release he mentioned Graham Rahal and J. R. Hildebrand as the team's top targets. Hildebrand revealed on his Twitter account that he would be testing with Coyne's team at Sebring on February 15. Robin Miller reported that Milka Duno was the likely teammate of Hildebrand and that Rahal had turned down Coyne's offer of a seat. Duno was confirmed by the team on March 4, 2010. On March 8, Gordon Kirby reported that Alex Lloyd would be driving the #19.
- Dreyer & Reinbold Racing: British pairing Justin Wilson and Mike Conway were presented to the media at a February 2 press conference, at the team's race shop in Carmel, Indiana. The team left the #23 entry open for a 3rd car, if the funding became available. Ana Beatriz announced on her website that she would be driving that entry in the season-opening race in São Paulo. E. J. Viso also tested with the team on December 9, 2009, at Sebring. Tomas Scheckter returned to the team for the Indianapolis 500, taking over the #23 car that Beatriz drove in Brazil. Beatriz herself moved to a fourth Dreyer & Reinbold car – the number 25 entry – for Indianapolis. After Conway's injury at the Indianapolis 500, he missed the rest of the season. Scheckter replaced him at Texas and Graham Rahal replaced him at Iowa, joining former Newman/Haas Racing teammate Wilson. Paul Tracy drove the car at Watkins Glen with Robbie Buhl working on a deal to move Rahal to the vacant #23 machine. J. R. Hildebrand replaced Conway at two events and drove the team's No. 24 Roll Coater entry for Mid-Ohio and the No. 24 TranSystems machine in Sonoma.
- KV Racing Technology: Team owners Kevin Kalkhoven and Jimmy Vasser expanded from one to three cars for 2010. According to a radio interview on "Trackside with Curt Cavin and Kevin Lee", Paul Tracy had a verbal commitment with KV Racing to drive for the team in the Indy 500, Toronto, Edmonton, and one other race airing on ABC with sponsorship from GEICO and Honda Canada. Mario Moraes was expected to return in light of Jimmy Vasser returning from Brazil recently, according to Robin Miller's mail bag. On February 13, the team announced that E. J. Viso would test for the team at Sebring International Raceway on February 15, with the intentions of securing a full-time deal. Former Formula One driver Takuma Sato was confirmed by the team on February 18. On February 22, the team confirmed that Viso would drive for the team, driving the #8 car. Former Honda Formula One test driver James Rossiter had been expected to join the team as a third full-time driver, with Tracy in a fourth car part-time, but Mario Moraes returned to the team, driving the #32 car.
- CURB/Agajanian/3G Racing: In a statement made on October 7, 2009, Stanton Barrett claimed "We CURB/Agajanian/3G Racing are all working to find the proper sponsorship for next year" and that the team is, "working to see which races Stanton can run next year." Team co-owner Steve Sudler said in an interview with blog 16th and Georgetown that Richard Antinucci would be one of the team's drivers in 2010 and the team was building its program around him. The team explored possibilities for a second car, most likely for Jaques Lazier or Stanton Barrett. However, the team made no official announcement and did not participate in the open test at Barber Motorsport Park. Team 3G planned to start in St. Pete with Antinucci, however this did not happen.
- Bryan Herta Autosport: Herta formed the team in 2009 in a partnership with Vision Racing, and planned to enter at Indianapolis. On February 23, 2010, Curt Cavin reported that Sebastián Saavedra had signed full-time with BHA in Firestone Indy Lights and would run this year's Indianapolis 500. Blog Da Indy reported that Saavedra could have also run the Indycar races at Texas, Toronto, Sonoma and Homestead.
- Sam Schmidt Motorsports: Townsend Bell competed in the Indianapolis 500 in the #99 car, run in conjunction with Chip Ganassi Racing.

== Schedule ==
The final 2010 schedule was announced on July 31, 2009, with revisions announced on August 26, 2009. New events included a season-opening street race in São Paulo, Brazil, and the new Alabama Grand Prix at Barber Motorsports Park. Richmond and Milwaukee did not return in 2010.

| Icon | Legend |
|---|---|
| O | Oval/Speedway |
| R | Road course |
| S | Street circuit |

| Rnd | Date | Race Name | Track | Location |
|---|---|---|---|---|
| 1 | March 14 | São Paulo Indy 300 | S Streets of São Paulo | (Brazil) São Paulo, São Paulo |
| 2 | March 29^{†} | Honda Grand Prix of St. Petersburg | S Streets of St. Petersburg | (United States) St. Petersburg, Florida |
| 3 | April 11 | Indy Grand Prix of Alabama | R Barber Motorsports Park | (United States) Birmingham, Alabama |
| 4 | April 18 | Toyota Grand Prix of Long Beach | S Streets of Long Beach | (United States) Long Beach, California |
| 5 | May 1 | RoadRunner Turbo Indy 300 | O Kansas Speedway | (United States) Kansas City, Kansas |
| 6 | May 30 | 94th Indianapolis 500 | O Indianapolis Motor Speedway | (United States) Speedway, Indiana |
| 7 | June 5 | Firestone 550K | O Texas Motor Speedway | (United States) Fort Worth, Texas |
| 8 | June 20 | Iowa Corn Indy 250 | O Iowa Speedway | (United States) Newton, Iowa |
| 9 | July 4 | Camping World Grand Prix at The Glen | R Watkins Glen International | (United States) Watkins Glen, New York |
| 10 | July 18 | Honda Indy Toronto | S Exhibition Place | (Canada) Toronto, Ontario |
| 11 | July 25 | Honda Indy Edmonton | R Edmonton City Centre Airport | (Canada) Edmonton, Alberta |
| 12 | August 8 | Honda Indy 200 | R Mid-Ohio Sports Car Course | (United States) Lexington, Ohio |
| 13 | August 22 | Indy Grand Prix of Sonoma | R Infineon Raceway | (United States) Sonoma, California |
| 14 | August 28 | Peak Antifreeze and Motor Oil Indy 300 | O Chicagoland Speedway | (United States) Joliet, Illinois |
| 15 | September 4 | Kentucky Indy 300 | O Kentucky Speedway | (United States) Sparta, Kentucky |
| 16 | September 19 | Indy Japan 300 | O Twin Ring Motegi | (Japan) Motegi, Tochigi |
| 17 | October 2 | Cafés do Brasil Indy 300 | O Homestead-Miami Speedway | (United States) Homestead, Florida |

^{†} – The Honda Grand Prix of St. Petersburg was originally scheduled for March 28 (3:30 PM on ABC) but was postponed to the next day due to torrential rain.

== Testing ==
Two open tests were scheduled for February 24–26 at Barber Motorsports Park in Birmingham, Alabama and May 4 at Kentucky Speedway in Sparta, Kentucky. At Barber, Team Penske's Will Power recorded the best time over the three sessions, and topped the times in two of the three held. His lap time of 1:09.8724 – set in the third session – saw him as the only driver to set a time in the 1:09s. Teammates Hélio Castroneves and Ryan Briscoe set the second-fastest and third-fastest laps of the test. The Kentucky test was washed out by weepers – water seeping up onto the track from six inches of overnight rain – and no times were set.

== Results ==
| Rd. | Race | Pole position | Fastest lap | Most laps led | Race winner | | Report |
| Rd. | Race | Pole position | Fastest lap | Most laps led | Driver | Team | Report |
|---|---|---|---|---|---|---|---|
| 1 | São Paulo | (United Kingdom) Dario Franchitti | (Australia) Will Power | (United Kingdom) Dario Franchitti | (Australia) Will Power | (United States) Team Penske | Report |
| 2 | St. Petersburg | (Australia) Will Power | (Venezuela) E. J. Viso | (Australia) Will Power | (Australia) Will Power | (United States) Team Penske | Report |
| 3 | Barber | (Australia) Will Power | (United Kingdom) Justin Wilson | (United States) Marco Andretti | (Brazil) Hélio Castroneves | (United States) Team Penske | Report |
| 4 | Long Beach | (Australia) Will Power | (United States) Ryan Hunter-Reay | (United States) Ryan Hunter-Reay | (United States) Ryan Hunter-Reay | (United States) Andretti Autosport | Report |
| 5 | Kansas | (Australia) Ryan Briscoe | (Brazil) Tony Kanaan | (New Zealand) Scott Dixon | (New Zealand) Scott Dixon | (United States) Chip Ganassi Racing | Report |
| 6 | Indianapolis | (Brazil) Hélio Castroneves | (Australia) Will Power | (United Kingdom) Dario Franchitti | (United Kingdom) Dario Franchitti | (United States) Chip Ganassi Racing | Report |
| 7 | Texas | (Australia) Ryan Briscoe | (United States) Ryan Hunter-Reay | (Australia) Ryan Briscoe | (Australia) Ryan Briscoe | (United States) Team Penske | Report |
| 8 | Iowa | (Australia) Will Power | (United Kingdom) Dario Franchitti | (United Kingdom) Dario Franchitti | (Brazil) Tony Kanaan | (United States) Andretti Autosport | Report |
| 9 | Watkins Glen | (Australia) Will Power | (Australia) Will Power | (Australia) Will Power | (Australia) Will Power | (United States) Team Penske | Report |
| 10 | Toronto | (United Kingdom) Justin Wilson | (Australia) Will Power | (United Kingdom) Justin Wilson | (Australia) Will Power | (United States) Team Penske | Report |
| 11 | Edmonton | (Australia) Will Power | (New Zealand) Scott Dixon | (Australia) Will Power | (New Zealand) Scott Dixon | (United States) Chip Ganassi Racing | Report |
| 12 | Mid-Ohio | (Australia) Will Power | (Australia) Ryan Briscoe | (Canada) Alex Tagliani | (United Kingdom) Dario Franchitti | (United States) Chip Ganassi Racing | Report |
| 13 | Sonoma | (Australia) Will Power | (United States) J. R. Hildebrand | (Australia) Will Power | (Australia) Will Power | (United States) Team Penske | Report |
| 14 | Chicagoland | (Australia) Ryan Briscoe | (New Zealand) Scott Dixon | (Australia) Ryan Briscoe | (United Kingdom) Dario Franchitti | (United States) Chip Ganassi Racing | Report |
| 15 | Kentucky | (United States) Ed Carpenter | (United States) Ryan Hunter-Reay | (United Kingdom) Dan Wheldon | (Brazil) Hélio Castroneves | (United States) Team Penske | Report |
| 16 | Motegi | (Brazil) Hélio Castroneves | (Brazil) Hélio Castroneves | (Brazil) Hélio Castroneves | (Brazil) Hélio Castroneves | (United States) Team Penske | Report |
| 17 | Homestead | (United Kingdom) Dario Franchitti | (United States) Marco Andretti | (United Kingdom) Dario Franchitti | (New Zealand) Scott Dixon | (United States) Chip Ganassi Racing | Report |

== Race summaries ==
=== Round 1: São Paulo Indy 300 ===
- Sunday March 14, 2010 – 1:07 p.m. BRT / 12:07 p.m. EDT
- Streets of São Paulo – São Paulo, Brazil; Temporary street circuit, 2.536 miles (4.081 km)
- Distance: 75 laps / 190.2 miles (306.1 km); reduced to 61 laps / 154.696 miles (248.959 km) due to rain and two-hour time limit.
- Race weather: 75 °F (24 °C), scattered clouds with intermittent rain.
- Television: Versus (Bob Jenkins, Robbie Buhl, Jon Beekhuis, Jack Arute)
- Nielsen ratings: 0.40
- Attendance: 46,000 (race day)
- Pole position winner: #10 Dario Franchitti, 1:27.7354 sec, 104.058 mph (167.465 km/h)
- Most laps led: #10 Dario Franchitti, 29
- Race Report: 2010 São Paulo Indy 300

Top Five Finishers
| Fin. Pos | St. Pos | Car No. | Driver | Team | Laps | Time | Laps Led |
|---|---|---|---|---|---|---|---|
| 1 | 5 | 12 | (Australia) Will Power | Team Penske | 61 | 2:00:57.7112 | 4 |
| 2 | 4 | 37 | (United States) Ryan Hunter-Reay | Andretti Autosport | 61 | +1.8581 | 20 |
| 3 | 16 | 14 | (Brazil) Vítor Meira | A. J. Foyt Enterprises | 61 | +9.7094 | 0 |
| 4 | 12 | 2 | (Brazil) Raphael Matos | De Ferran Luczo Dragon Racing | 61 | +10.4235 | 0 |
| 5 | 18 | 4 | (United Kingdom) Dan Wheldon | Panther Racing | 61 | +10.8883 | 0 |
Race average speed: 76.733 mph (123.490 km/h)
Lead changes: 7 between 5 drivers
Cautions: 5 for 19 laps

=== Round 2: Honda Grand Prix of St. Petersburg ===
- Monday March 29, 2010 – 10:25 a.m. EDT; postponed from Sunday March 28 due to rain.
- Streets of St. Petersburg – St. Petersburg, Florida; Temporary street circuit, 1.800 miles (2.897 km)
- Distance: 100 laps / 180.000 miles (289.682 km)
- Race weather: 62 °F (17 °C), scattered clouds
- Television: ESPN2 (Marty Reid, Scott Goodyear, Vince Welch, Jamie Little, Rick DeBruhl)
- Nielsen ratings: 0.6 (Sunday rainout)
- Attendance:
- Pole position winner: #12 Will Power, 1:01.6026 sec, 105.190 mph (169.287 km/h)
- Most laps led: #12 Will Power, 50
- Race Report: 2010 Honda Grand Prix of St. Petersburg

Top Five Finishers
| Fin. Pos | St. Pos | Car No. | Driver | Team | Laps | Time | Laps Led |
|---|---|---|---|---|---|---|---|
| 1 | 1 | 12 | (Australia) Will Power | Team Penske | 100 | 2:07:05.7968 | 50 |
| 2 | 4 | 22 | (United Kingdom) Justin Wilson | Dreyer & Reinbold Racing | 100 | +0.8244 | 0 |
| 3 | 19 | 6 | (Australia) Ryan Briscoe | Team Penske | 100 | +4.7290 | 9 |
| 4 | 5 | 3 | (Brazil) Hélio Castroneves | Team Penske | 100 | +5.1699 | 0 |
| 5 | 13 | 10 | (United Kingdom) Dario Franchitti | Chip Ganassi Racing | 100 | +22.2172 | 3 |
Race average speed: 84.975 mph (136.754 km/h)
Lead changes: 10 between 8 drivers
Cautions: 5 for 23 laps

=== Round 3: Indy Grand Prix of Alabama ===
- Sunday April 11, 2010 – 3:45 p.m. EDT / 2:45 p.m. CDT
- Barber Motorsports Park – Birmingham, Alabama; Permanent road course, 2.300 miles (3.701 km)
- Distance: 90 laps / 207.000 miles (333.134 km)
- Race weather: 77 °F (25 °C), clear skies
- Television: Versus (Bob Jenkins, Robbie Buhl, Jon Beekhuis, Jack Arute, Lindy Thackston, Robbie Floyd)
- Nielsen ratings: 0.30
- Attendance: 53,555 (race day)
- Pole position winner: #12 Will Power, 1:10.1356 sec, 118.057 mph (189.994 km/h)
- Most laps led: #26 Marco Andretti, 58
- Race Report: 2010 Indy Grand Prix of Alabama

Top Five Finishers
| Fin. Pos | St. Pos | Car No. | Driver | Team | Laps | Time | Laps Led |
|---|---|---|---|---|---|---|---|
| 1 | 3 | 3 | (Brazil) Hélio Castroneves | Team Penske | 90 | 1:56:41.3928 | 20 |
| 2 | 5 | 9 | (New Zealand) Scott Dixon | Chip Ganassi Racing | 90 | +0.5703 | 0 |
| 3 | 7 | 10 | (United Kingdom) Dario Franchitti | Chip Ganassi Racing | 90 | +8.1590 | 0 |
| 4 | 1 | 12 | (Australia) Will Power | Team Penske | 90 | +8.6639 | 12 |
| 5 | 4 | 26 | (United States) Marco Andretti | Andretti Autosport | 90 | +9.7410 | 58 |
Race average speed: 106.436 mph (171.292 km/h)
Lead changes: 7 between 3 drivers
Cautions: 2 for 5 laps

=== Round 4: Toyota Grand Prix of Long Beach ===
- Sunday April 18, 2010 – 4:15 p.m. EDT / 1:15 p.m. PDT
- Streets of Long Beach – Long Beach, California; Temporary street circuit, 1.968 miles (3.167 km)
- Distance: 85 laps / 167.280 miles (269.211 km)
- Race weather: 66 °F (19 °C), clear skies
- Television: Versus (Bob Jenkins, Robbie Buhl, Jon Beekhuis, Jack Arute, Lindy Thackston, Robbie Floyd)
- Nielsen ratings: 0.54
- Attendance: race day 65,000 – estimated/reported weekend 170,000
- Pole position winner: #12 Will Power, 1:09.3185 sec, 102.206 mph (164.485 km/h)
- Most laps led: #37 Ryan Hunter-Reay, 64
- Race Report: 2010 Toyota Grand Prix of Long Beach

Top Five Finishers
| Fin. Pos | St. Pos | Car No. | Driver | Team | Laps | Time | Laps Led |
|---|---|---|---|---|---|---|---|
| 1 | 2 | 37 | (United States) Ryan Hunter-Reay | Andretti Autosport | 85 | 1:47:12.5404 | 64 |
| 2 | 3 | 22 | (United Kingdom) Justin Wilson | Dreyer & Reinbold Racing | 85 | +5.6031 | 0 |
| 3 | 1 | 12 | (Australia) Will Power | Team Penske | 85 | +8.5864 | 19 |
| 4 | 8 | 9 | (New Zealand) Scott Dixon | Chip Ganassi Racing | 85 | +10.6287 | 2 |
| 5 | 6 | 11 | (Brazil) Tony Kanaan | Andretti Autosport | 85 | +11.7732 | 0 |
Race average speed: 93.619 mph (150.665 km/h)
Lead changes: 5 between 3 drivers
Cautions: 1 for 5 laps

=== Round 5: RoadRunner Turbo Indy 300 ===
- Saturday May 1, 2010 – 2:00 p.m. EDT / 1:00 p.m. CDT
- Kansas Speedway – Kansas City, Kansas; Permanent racing facility, 1.520 miles (2.446 km)
- Distance: 200 laps / 304.000 miles (489.241 km)
- Race weather: 63 °F (17 °C), partly cloudy
- Television: ABC (Marty Reid, Scott Goodyear, Vince Welch, Jamie Little, Rick DeBruhl)
- Nielsen ratings: 0.8
- Attendance: 15,000
- Pole position winner: #6 Ryan Briscoe, 1:43.1747 sec, 212.145 mph (341.414 km/h) (4-lap)
- Most laps led: #9 Scott Dixon, 167
- Race Report: 2010 RoadRunner Turbo Indy 300

Top Five Finishers
| Fin. Pos | St. Pos | Car No. | Driver | Team | Laps | Time | Laps Led |
|---|---|---|---|---|---|---|---|
| 1 | 2 | 9 | (New Zealand) Scott Dixon | Chip Ganassi Racing | 200 | 1:50:43.1410 | 167 |
| 2 | 3 | 10 | (United Kingdom) Dario Franchitti | Chip Ganassi Racing | 200 | +3.0528 | 2 |
| 3 | 15 | 11 | (Brazil) Tony Kanaan | Andretti Autosport | 200 | +3.2210 | 0 |
| 4 | 8 | 3 | (Brazil) Hélio Castroneves | Team Penske | 200 | +3.8300 | 0 |
| 5 | 22 | 37 | (United States) Ryan Hunter-Reay | Andretti Autosport | 200 | +6.1133 | 0 |
Race average speed: 164.741 mph (265.125 km/h)
Lead changes: 3 between 3 drivers
Cautions: 4 for 33 laps

=== Round 6: 94th Indianapolis 500 ===
- Sunday May 30, 2010 – 1:12 p.m. EDT / 12:12 p.m. CDT
- Indianapolis Motor Speedway – Speedway, Indiana; Permanent racing facility, 2.500 miles (4.023 km)
- Distance: 200 laps / 500.000 miles (804.672 km)
- Race weather: 88 °F (31 °C), partly cloudy
- Television: ABC (Marty Reid, Scott Goodyear, Eddie Cheever, Brent Musburger, Vince Welch, Jamie Little, Rick DeBruhl, Jerry Punch)
- Nielsen ratings: 3.6 (4.0 overnight)
- Attendance:
- Pole position winner: #3 Hélio Castroneves, 2:37.9154 sec, 227.790 mph (366.592 km/h) (4-lap)
- Most laps led: #10 Dario Franchitti, 155
- Race Report: 2010 Indianapolis 500

Top Five Finishers
| Fin. Pos | St. Pos | Car No. | Driver | Team | Laps | Time | Laps Led |
|---|---|---|---|---|---|---|---|
| 1 | 3 | 10 | (United Kingdom) Dario Franchitti | Chip Ganassi Racing | 200 | 3:05:37.0131 | 155 |
| 2 | 18 | 4 | (United Kingdom) Dan Wheldon | Panther Racing | 200 | +0.1536 | 0 |
| 3 | 16 | 26 | (United States) Marco Andretti | Andretti Autosport | 200 | +20.9875 | 1 |
| 4 | 26 | 19 | (United Kingdom) Alex Lloyd | Dale Coyne Racing | 200 | +20.9876 | 0 |
| 5 | 6 | 9 | (New Zealand) Scott Dixon | Chip Ganassi Racing | 200 | +21.4922 | 0 |
Race average speed: 161.623 mph (260.107 km/h)
Lead changes: 13 between 8 drivers
Cautions: 9 for 44 laps

=== Round 7: Firestone 550 ===
- Saturday June 5, 2010 – 8:50 p.m. EDT / 7:50 p.m. CDT
- Texas Motor Speedway – Fort Worth, Texas; Permanent racing facility, 1.455 miles (2.342 km)
- Distance: 228 laps / 331.740 miles (533.884 km)
- Race weather: 93 °F (34 °C), clear skies
- Television: Versus (Bob Jenkins, Robbie Buhl, Jon Beekhuis, Jack Arute, Lindy Thackston, Robbie Floyd)
- Nielsen ratings: 0.3
- Attendance: 73,000
- Pole position winner: #6 Ryan Briscoe, 1:37.3275 sec, 215.273 mph (346.448 km/h) (4-lap)
- Most laps led: #6 Ryan Briscoe, 102
- Race Report: 2010 Firestone 550

Top Five Finishers
| Fin. Pos | St. Pos | Car No. | Driver | Team | Laps | Time | Laps Led |
|---|---|---|---|---|---|---|---|
| 1 | 1 | 6 | (Australia) Ryan Briscoe | Team Penske | 228 | 2:04:47.1555 | 102 |
| 2 | 8 | 7 | (United States) Danica Patrick | Andretti Autosport | 228 | +1.4629 | 1 |
| 3 | 10 | 26 | (United States) Marco Andretti | Andretti Autosport | 228 | +2.3162 | 0 |
| 4 | 4 | 9 | (New Zealand) Scott Dixon | Chip Ganassi Racing | 228 | +3.0770 | 0 |
| 5 | 2 | 10 | (United Kingdom) Dario Franchitti | Chip Ganassi Racing | 228 | +7.5882 | 86 |
Race average speed: 159.508 mph (256.703 km/h)
Lead changes: 10 between 7 drivers
Cautions: 4 for 36 laps

=== Round 8: Iowa Corn Indy 250 ===
- Sunday June 20, 2010 – 2:15 p.m. EDT / 1:15 p.m. CDT
- Iowa Speedway – Newton, Iowa; Permanent racing facility, 0.894 miles (1.439 km)
- Distance: 250 laps / 223.500 miles (359.688 km)
- Race weather: 78 °F (26 °C), clear skies
- Television: Versus (Bob Jenkins, Robbie Buhl, Jon Beekhuis, Jack Arute, Lindy Thackston, Robbie Floyd)
- Nielsen ratings: 0.2
- Attendance: 34,248
- Pole position winner: #12 Will Power, 1:10.9925 sec, 181.337 mph (291.834 km/h) (4-lap)
- Most laps led: #10 Dario Franchitti, 69
- Race Report: 2010 Iowa Corn Indy 250

Top Five Finishers
| Fin. Pos | St. Pos | Car No. | Driver | Team | Laps | Time | Laps Led |
|---|---|---|---|---|---|---|---|
| 1 | 15 | 11 | (Brazil) Tony Kanaan | Andretti Autosport | 250 | 1:42:12.4036 | 62 |
| 2 | 4 | 3 | (Brazil) Hélio Castroneves | Team Penske | 250 | +4.2030 | 43 |
| 3 | 19 | 8 | (Venezuela) E. J. Viso | KV Racing Technology | 250 | +5.2538 | 0 |
| 4 | 8 | 6 | (Australia) Ryan Briscoe | Team Penske | 250 | +9.0536 | 0 |
| 5 | 1 | 12 | (Australia) Will Power | Team Penske | 250 | +9.5902 | 32 |
Race average speed: 131.205 mph (211.154 km/h)
Lead changes: 16 between 7 drivers
Cautions: 4 for 51 laps

=== Round 9: Camping World Grand Prix at The Glen ===
- Sunday July 4, 2010 – 3:55 p.m. EDT
- Watkins Glen International – Watkins Glen, New York; Permanent racing facility, 3.370 miles (5.423 km)
- Distance: 60 laps / 202.200 miles (325.409 km)
- Race weather: 87 °F (31 °C), clear skies
- Television: ABC (Marty Reid, Scott Goodyear, Vince Welch, Jamie Little, Rick DeBruhl)
- Nielsen ratings: 0.9
- Attendance:
- Pole position winner: #12 Will Power, 1:29.3164 sec, 135.832 mph (218.600 km/h)
- Most laps led: #12 Will Power, 45
- Race Report: 2010 Camping World Grand Prix at The Glen

Top Five Finishers
| Fin. Pos | St. Pos | Car No. | Driver | Team | Laps | Time | Laps Led |
|---|---|---|---|---|---|---|---|
| 1 | 1 | 12 | (Australia) Will Power | Team Penske | 60 | 1:40:27.4391 | 45 |
| 2 | 3 | 6 | (Australia) Ryan Briscoe | Team Penske | 60 | +1.2181 | 4 |
| 3 | 4 | 10 | (United Kingdom) Dario Franchitti | Chip Ganassi Racing | 60 | +2.6754 | 1 |
| 4 | 11 | 2 | (Brazil) Raphael Matos | De Ferran Dragon Racing | 60 | +8.0208 | 0 |
| 5 | 9 | 32 | (Brazil) Mario Moraes | KV Racing Technology | 60 | +9.3229 | 0 |
Race average speed: 120.768 mph (194.357 km/h)
Lead changes: 5 between 4 drivers
Cautions: 2 for 5 laps

=== Round 10: Honda Indy Toronto ===
- Sunday July 18, 2010 – 1:00 p.m. EDT
- Streets of Toronto – Toronto, Ontario; Temporary street circuit, 1.755 miles (2.824 km)
- Distance: 85 laps / 149.175 miles (240.074 km)
- Race weather: 79 °F (26 °C), mostly cloudy
- Television: ABC (Marty Reid, Scott Goodyear, Vince Welch, Jamie Little, Rick DeBruhl)
- Nielsen ratings: 0.9
- Attendance:
- Pole position winner: #22 Justin Wilson, 1:00.2710 sec, 104.827 mph (168.703 km/h)
- Most laps led: #22 Justin Wilson, 32
- Race Report: 2010 Honda Indy Toronto

Top Five Finishers
| Fin. Pos | St. Pos | Car No. | Driver | Team | Laps | Time | Laps Led |
|---|---|---|---|---|---|---|---|
| 1 | 2 | 12 | (Australia) Will Power | Team Penske | 85 | 1:47:15.2554 | 15 |
| 2 | 5 | 10 | (United Kingdom) Dario Franchitti | Chip Ganassi Racing | 85 | +1.2757 | 22 |
| 3 | 4 | 37 | (United States) Ryan Hunter-Reay | Andretti Autosport | 85 | +1.7605 | 0 |
| 4 | 8 | 11 | (Brazil) Tony Kanaan | Andretti Autosport | 85 | +3.5382 | 2 |
| 5 | 14 | 02 | (United States) Graham Rahal | Newman/Haas Racing | 85 | +9.7349 | 0 |
Race average speed: 83.451 mph (134.301 km/h)
Lead changes: 6 between 5 drivers
Cautions: 6 for 21 laps

=== Round 11: Honda Indy Edmonton ===
- Sunday July 25, 2010 – 5:55 p.m. EDT / 3:55 p.m. MDT
- Edmonton City Centre Airport – Edmonton, Alberta; Temporary airport course, 1.973 miles (3.175 km)
- Distance: 95 laps / 187.435 miles (301.647 km)
- Race weather: 73 °F (23 °C), clear skies
- Television: Versus (Bob Jenkins, Robbie Buhl, Jon Beekhuis, Jack Arute, Lindy Thackston, Robbie Floyd)
- Nielsen ratings: 0.31
- Attendance:
- Pole position winner: #12 Will Power, 1:00.7126 sec, 116.991 mph (188.279 km/h)
- Most laps led: #12 Will Power, 76
- Race Report: 2010 Honda Indy Edmonton

Top Five Finishers
| Fin. Pos | St. Pos | Car No. | Driver | Team | Laps | Time | Laps Led |
|---|---|---|---|---|---|---|---|
| 1 | 3 | 9 | (New Zealand) Scott Dixon | Chip Ganassi Racing | 95 | 1:50:37.0551 | 2 |
| 2 | 1 | 12 | (Australia) Will Power | Team Penske | 95 | +2.6688 | 76 |
| 3 | 4 | 10 | (United Kingdom) Dario Franchitti | Chip Ganassi Racing | 95 | +3.2831 | 0 |
| 4 | 5 | 6 | (Australia) Ryan Briscoe | Team Penske | 95 | +8.8652 | 0 |
| 5 | 8 | 37 | (United States) Ryan Hunter-Reay | Andretti Autosport | 95 | +11.1482 | 0 |
Race average speed: 101.666 mph (163.616 km/h)
Lead changes: 4 between 3 drivers
Cautions: 4 for 10 laps

=== Round 12: Honda Indy 200 ===
- Sunday August 8, 2010 – 3:00 p.m. EDT
- Mid-Ohio Sports Car Course – Lexington, Ohio; Permanent racing facility, 2.258 miles (3.634 km)
- Distance: 85 laps / 191.930 miles (308.881 km)
- Race weather: 86 °F (30 °C), clear skies
- Television: Versus (Bob Jenkins, Robbie Buhl, Jon Beekhuis, Jack Arute, Lindy Thackston, Robbie Floyd)
- Nielsen ratings: 0.33
- Attendance:
- Pole position winner: #12 Will Power, 1:07.1997 sec, 120.965 mph (194.674 km/h)
- Most laps led: #77 Alex Tagliani, 30
- Race Report: 2010 Honda Indy 200

Top Five Finishers
| Fin. Pos | St. Pos | Car No. | Driver | Team | Laps | Time | Laps Led |
|---|---|---|---|---|---|---|---|
| 1 | 2 | 10 | (United Kingdom) Dario Franchitti | Chip Ganassi Racing | 85 | 1:54:32.2568 | 29 |
| 2 | 1 | 12 | (Australia) Will Power | Team Penske | 85 | +0.5234 | 25 |
| 3 | 6 | 3 | (Brazil) Hélio Castroneves | Team Penske | 85 | +4.0883 | 0 |
| 4 | 14 | 77 | (Canada) Alex Tagliani | FAZZT Race Team | 85 | +5.6423 | 30 |
| 5 | 5 | 9 | (New Zealand) Scott Dixon | Chip Ganassi Racing | 85 | +5.9150 | 0 |
Race average speed: 100.542 mph (161.807 km/h)
Lead changes: 4 between 4 drivers
Cautions: 5 for 15 laps

=== Round 13: Indy Grand Prix of Sonoma ===
- Sunday August 22, 2010 – 5:50 p.m. EDT / 2:50 p.m. PDT
- Infineon Raceway – Sonoma, California; Permanent racing facility, 2.303 miles (3.706 km)
- Distance: 75 laps / 172.725 miles (277.974 km)
- Race weather: 78 °F (26 °C), clear skies
- Television: Versus (Bob Jenkins, Robbie Buhl, Jon Beekhuis, Jack Arute, Lindy Thackston, Robbie Floyd)
- Nielsen ratings: 0.25
- Attendance:
- Pole position winner: #12 Will Power, 1:16.5282 sec, 108.337 mph (174.352 km/h)
- Most laps led: #12 Will Power, 73
- Race Report: 2010 Indy Grand Prix of Sonoma

Top Five Finishers
| Fin. Pos | St. Pos | Car No. | Driver | Team | Laps | Time | Laps Led |
|---|---|---|---|---|---|---|---|
| 1 | 1 | 12 | (Australia) Will Power | Team Penske | 75 | 1:52:34.1915 | 73 |
| 2 | 6 | 9 | (New Zealand) Scott Dixon | Chip Ganassi Racing | 75 | +0.7432 | 2 |
| 3 | 3 | 10 | (United Kingdom) Dario Franchitti | Chip Ganassi Racing | 75 | +6.6132 | 0 |
| 4 | 5 | 6 | (Australia) Ryan Briscoe | Team Penske | 75 | +7.8607 | 0 |
| 5 | 2 | 3 | (Brazil) Hélio Castroneves | Team Penske | 75 | +10.4594 | 0 |
Race average speed: 92.063 mph (148.161 km/h)
Lead changes: 2 between 2 drivers
Cautions: 4 for 10 laps

=== Round 14: Peak Antifreeze & Motor Oil Indy 300 ===
- Saturday August 28, 2010 – 7:50 p.m. EDT / 6:50 p.m. CDT
- Chicagoland Speedway – Joliet, Illinois; Permanent racing facility, 1.520 miles (2.446 km)
- Distance: 200 laps / 304.000 miles (489.241 km)
- Race weather: 86 °F (30 °C), clear skies
- Television: Versus (Bob Jenkins, Robbie Buhl, Jon Beekhuis, Jack Arute, Lindy Thackston, Robbie Floyd)
- Nielsen ratings: 0.47
- Attendance:
- Pole position winner: #6 Ryan Briscoe, 50.5857 sec, 216.346 mph (348.175 km/h) (2-lap)
- Most laps led: #6 Ryan Briscoe, 113
- Race Report: 2010 Peak Antifreeze & Motor Oil Indy 300

Top Five Finishers
| Fin. Pos | St. Pos | Car No. | Driver | Team | Laps | Time | Laps Led |
|---|---|---|---|---|---|---|---|
| 1 | 2 | 10 | (United Kingdom) Dario Franchitti | Chip Ganassi Racing | 200 | 1:47:49.5783 | 28 |
| 2 | 7 | 4 | (United Kingdom) Dan Wheldon | Panther Racing | 200 | +0.0423 | 14 |
| 3 | 5 | 26 | (United States) Marco Andretti | Andretti Autosport | 200 | +0.1051 | 3 |
| 4 | 9 | 37 | (United States) Ryan Hunter-Reay | Andretti Autosport | 200 | +0.1631 | 2 |
| 5 | 13 | 11 | (Brazil) Tony Kanaan | Andretti Autosport | 200 | +0.3408 | 0 |
Race average speed: 169.161 mph (272.238 km/h)
Lead changes: 25 between 11 drivers
Cautions: 3 for 28 laps

=== Round 15: Kentucky Indy 300 ===
- Saturday September 4, 2010 – 8:50 p.m. EDT
- Kentucky Speedway – Sparta, Kentucky; Permanent racing facility, 1.480 miles (2.382 km)
- Distance: 200 laps / 296.000 miles (476.366 km)
- Race weather: 67 °F (19 °C), clear skies
- Television: Versus (Bob Jenkins, Robbie Buhl, Jon Beekhuis, Jack Arute, Lindy Thackston, Robbie Floyd)
- Nielsen ratings: 0.23
- Attendance:
- Pole position winner: #20 Ed Carpenter, 48.8958 sec, 217.933 mph (350.729 km/h) (2-lap)
- Most laps led: #4 Dan Wheldon, 93
- Race Report: 2010 Kentucky Indy 300

Top Five Finishers
| Fin. Pos | St. Pos | Car No. | Driver | Team | Laps | Time | Laps Led |
|---|---|---|---|---|---|---|---|
| 1 | 8 | 3 | (Brazil) Hélio Castroneves | Team Penske | 200 | 1:41:50.0059 | 7 |
| 2 | 1 | 20 | (United States) Ed Carpenter | Panther Racing | 200 | +13.1597 | 11 |
| 3 | 3 | 4 | (United Kingdom) Dan Wheldon | Panther Racing | 200 | +13.9214 | 93 |
| 4 | 26 | 11 | (Brazil) Tony Kanaan | Andretti Autosport | 200 | +13.9931 | 0 |
| 5 | 11 | 10 | (United Kingdom) Dario Franchitti | Chip Ganassi Racing | 200 | +14.1968 | 0 |
Race average speed: 174.402 mph (280.673 km/h)
Lead changes: 11 between 7 drivers
Cautions: 2 for 23 laps

=== Round 16: Indy Japan 300 ===
- Sunday September 19, 2010 – 1:00 p.m. JST / 12:00 a.m. EDT
- Twin Ring Motegi – Motegi, Tochigi; Permanent racing facility, 1.520 miles (2.446 km)
- Distance: 200 laps / 304.000 miles (489.241 km)
- Race weather: 83 °F (28 °C), partly cloudy
- Television: Versus (Bob Jenkins, Robbie Buhl, Jon Beekhuis, Jack Arute)
- Nielsen ratings: 181,000 viewers
- Attendance:
- Pole position winner: #3 Hélio Castroneves, 54.1803 sec, 201.992 mph (325.075 km/h) (2-lap)
- Most laps led: #3 Hélio Castroneves, 153
- Race Report: 2010 Indy Japan 300

Top Five Finishers
| Fin. Pos | St. Pos | Car No. | Driver | Team | Laps | Time | Laps Led |
|---|---|---|---|---|---|---|---|
| 1 | 1 | 3 | (Brazil) Hélio Castroneves | Team Penske | 200 | 2:04:04.4780 | 153 |
| 2 | 4 | 10 | (United Kingdom) Dario Franchitti | Chip Ganassi Racing | 200 | +4.5746 | 0 |
| 3 | 3 | 12 | (Australia) Will Power | Team Penske | 200 | +5.0743 | 0 |
| 4 | 2 | 6 | (Australia) Ryan Briscoe | Team Penske | 200 | +6.4825 | 32 |
| 5 | 12 | 7 | (United States) Danica Patrick | Andretti Autosport | 200 | +7.6057 | 0 |
Race average speed: 147.008 mph (236.586 km/h)
Lead changes: 3 between 3 drivers
Cautions: 5 for 50 laps

=== Round 17: Cafés do Brasil Indy 300 ===
- Saturday October 2, 2010 – 7:00 p.m. EDT
- Homestead-Miami Speedway – Homestead, Florida; Permanent racing facility, 1.485 miles (2.390 km)
- Distance: 200 laps / 297.000 miles (477.975 km)
- Race weather: 87 °F (31 °C), clear skies
- Television: Versus (Bob Jenkins, Robbie Buhl, Jon Beekhuis, Jack Arute, Lindy Thackston, Robbie Floyd)
- Nielsen ratings: 0.56
- Attendance:
- Pole position winner: #10 Dario Franchitti, 50.1532 sec, 213.187 mph (343.091 km/h) (2-lap)
- Most laps led: #10 Dario Franchitti, 128
- Race Report: 2010 Cafés do Brasil Indy 300

Top Five Finishers
| Fin. Pos | St. Pos | Car No. | Driver | Team | Laps | Time | Laps Led |
|---|---|---|---|---|---|---|---|
| 1 | 2 | 9 | (New Zealand) Scott Dixon | Chip Ganassi Racing | 200 | 1:52:08.5580 | 47 |
| 2 | 11 | 7 | (United States) Danica Patrick | Andretti Autosport | 200 | +2.7587 | 0 |
| 3 | 8 | 11 | (Brazil) Tony Kanaan | Andretti Autosport | 200 | +2.7698 | 4 |
| 4 | 4 | 6 | (Australia) Ryan Briscoe | Team Penske | 200 | +3.7827 | 7 |
| 5 | 10 | 3 | (Brazil) Hélio Castroneves | Team Penske | 200 | +5.3324 | 1 |
Race average speed: 158.905 mph (255.733 km/h)
Lead changes: 18 between 7 drivers
Cautions: 5 for 39 laps

== Points standings ==
- Ties in points broken by number of wins, followed by number of 2nds, 3rds, etc., and then by number of pole positions, followed by number of times qualified 2nd, etc.

=== Driver standings ===
- One point is awarded to any driver who leads at least one lap during a race. Two additional points are awarded to the driver who leads the most laps in a race.
- At Texas, the event is split into two half-distance races on the same day. Each one awards half points.
- Bonus points are awarded for qualifying performance:
  - At all tracks except Indianapolis, the driver who qualifies on pole earns one point.
  - At Indianapolis, drivers who advance to Q2 earn bonus points. Drivers who qualify tenth through twenty-fourth earn four qualifying points, and the remaining qualifying drivers earn three points.
  - At Texas, the grid for the second race is set by a draw, and no bonus point is awarded for the pole position.

| Pos | Driver | SAO | STP | BAR | LBH | KAN | INDY | TMS | IOW | WGL | TOR | EDM | MOH | SON | CHI | KEN | MOT | HOM | Pts |
|---|---|---|---|---|---|---|---|---|---|---|---|---|---|---|---|---|---|---|---|
| 1 | (United Kingdom) Dario Franchitti | **7*** | 5 | 3 | 12 | 2 | 1*^{3} | 5 | 18* | 3 | 2 | 3 | 1 | 3 | 1 | 5 | 2 | **8*** | 602 |
| 2 | (Australia) Will Power | 1 | **1*** | **4** | **3** | 12 | 8^{2} | 14 | **5** | **1*** | 1 | **2*** | **2** | **1*** | 16 | 8 | 3 | 25 | 597 |
| 3 | (New Zealand) Scott Dixon | 6 | 18 | 2 | 4 | 1* | 5^{6} | 4 | 6 | 8 | 20 | 1 | 5 | 2 | 8 | 7 | 6 | 1 | 547 |
| 4 | (Brazil) Hélio Castroneves | 9 | 4 | 1 | 7 | 4 | **9**^{1} | 20 | 2 | 9 | 24 | 10 | 3 | 5 | 6 | 1 | **1*** | 5 | 531 |
| 5 | (Australia) Ryan Briscoe | 14 | 3 | 6 | 8 | **6** | 24^{4} | **1*** | 4 | 2 | 18 | 4 | 6 | 4 | **11*** | 24 | 4 | 4 | 482 |
| 6 | (Brazil) Tony Kanaan | 10 | 10 | 8 | 5 | 3 | 11^{32} | 6 | 1 | 21 | 4 | 12 | 17 | 7 | 5 | 4 | 7 | 3 | 453 |
| 7 | (United States) Ryan Hunter-Reay | 2 | 11 | 12 | 1* | 5 | 18^{17} | 7 | 8 | 7 | 3 | 5 | 10 | 8 | 4 | 21 | 9 | 11 | 445 |
| 8 | (United States) Marco Andretti | 23 | 12 | 5* | 14 | 13 | 3^{16} | 3 | 15 | 13 | 8 | 11 | 9 | 12 | 3 | 6 | 11 | 7 | 392 |
| 9 | (United Kingdom) Dan Wheldon | 5 | 20 | 11 | 9 | 15 | 2^{18} | 9 | 11 | 6 | 10 | 20 | 14 | 25 | 2 | 3* | 10 | 9 | 388 |
| 10 | (United States) Danica Patrick | 15 | 7 | 19 | 16 | 11 | 6^{23} | 2 | 10 | 20 | 6 | 15 | 21 | 16 | 14 | 9 | 5 | 2 | 367 |
| 11 | (United Kingdom) Justin Wilson | 11 | 2 | 7 | 2 | 18 | 7^{11} | 19 | 24 | 10 | **7*** | 21 | 27 | 6 | 7 | 11 | 16 | 21 | 361 |
| 12 | (Brazil) Vítor Meira | 3 | 15 | 18 | 11 | 10 | 27^{30} | 10 | 7 | 19 | 11 | 16 | 15 | 15 | 9 | 23 | 17 | 6 | 310 |
| 13 | (Canada) Alex Tagliani | 19 | 6 | 10 | 21 | 8 | 10^{5} | 18 | 12 | 17 | 17 | 23 | 4* | 14 | 25 | 15 | 13 | 14 | 302 |
| 14 | (Brazil) Raphael Matos | 4 | 8 | 14 | 20 | 16 | 29^{12} | 16 | 14 | 4 | 21 | 13 | 7 | 21 | 29 | 16 | 18 | 17 | 290 |
| 15 | (Brazil) Mario Moraes | 24 | 21 | 13 | 6 | 7 | 31^{13} | 21 | 25 | 5 | 14 | 7 | 12 | 11 | 17 | 18 | 24 | 27 | 287 |
| 16 | (United Kingdom) Alex Lloyd RY | 18 | 23 | 23 | 19 | 19 | 4^{26} | 8 | 13 | 25 | 23 | 18 | 13 | 10 | 21 | 13 | 21 | 12 | 266 |
| 17 | (Venezuela) E. J. Viso | 12 | 17 | 16 | 15 | 27 | 25^{19} | 11 | 3 | 11 | 19 | 8 | 26 | 19 | 27 | 26 | 15 | 19 | 262 |
| 18 | (Japan) Hideki Mutoh | 20 | 14 | 15 | 13 | 23 | 28^{9} | 12 | 20 | 12 | 12 | 17 | 18 | 17 | 13 | 17 | 14 | 20 | 250 |
| 19 | (Switzerland) Simona de Silvestro R | 16 | 16 | 21 | 17 | 21 | 14^{22} | 24 | 21 | 24 | 9 | 22 | 8 | 13 | 23 | 25 | 23 | 23 | 242 |
| 20 | (United States) Graham Rahal | | 9 | 17 | 22 | | 12^{7} | | 9 | | 5 | | 20 | 9 | 10 | 20 | 8 | 10 | 235 |
| 21 | (Japan) Takuma Sato R | 22 | 22 | 25 | 18 | 24 | 20^{31} | 25 | 19 | 15 | 25 | 9 | 25 | 18 | 26 | 27 | 12 | 18 | 214 |
| 22 | (Belgium) Bertrand Baguette R | | | 20 | 24 | 20 | 22^{24} | 22 | 17 | 18 | 16 | 14 | 11 | 23 | 12 | 10 | 25 | 15 | 213 |
| 23 | (Venezuela) Milka Duno | 21 | 24 | 24 | 25 | 26 | DNQ | 23 | 23 | 23 | 26 | 25 | 23 | 22 | 19 | 19 | 19 | 24 | 184 |
| 24 | (Brazil) Mario Romancini R | 17 | 13 | 22 | 23 | 22 | 13^{27} | 17 | 16 | 22 | 22 | 24 | | | | | | | 149 |
| 25 | (United Kingdom) Mike Conway | 8 | 19 | 9 | 10 | 14 | 19^{15} | | | | | | | | | | | | 110 |
| 26 | (United States) Sarah Fisher | | | | | 17 | 26^{29} | 15 | 22 | | | | | | 15 | 22 | | 22 | 92 |
| 27 | (Canada) Paul Tracy | | | | | | DNQ | | | 14 | 13 | 6 | | | | 12 | 22 | | 91 |
| 28 | (United States) Ed Carpenter | | | | | | 17^{8} | | | | | | | | 20 | **2** | | 13 | 90 |
| 29 | (South Africa) Tomas Scheckter | | | | | | 15^{20} | 13 | | | 15 | 19 | | | 28 | 14 | | | 89 |
| 30 | (Brazil) Ana Beatriz R | 13 | | | | | 21^{21} | | | | | | | | 24 | | | 26 | 55 |
| 31 | (United Kingdom) Jay Howard R | | | | | 25 | DNQ | 26 | | | | | 24 | | 22 | | | | 44 |
| 32 | (United States) John Andretti | | | | | 9 | 30^{28} | | | | | | | | | | | | 35 |
| 33 | (Colombia) Sebastián Saavedra R | | | | | | 23^{33} | | | | | | | | | | | 16 | 29 |
| 34 | (United Kingdom) Adam Carroll R | | | | | | | | | 16 | | | 19 | | | | | | 26 |
| 35 | (United States) J. R. Hildebrand R | | | | | | | | | | | | 16 | 24 | | | | | 26 |
| 36 | (United States) Davey Hamilton | | | | | | 33^{14} | | | | | | | | 18 | | | | 26 |
| 37 | (Italy) Francesco Dracone R | | | | | | | | | | | | 22 | 20 | | | | | 24 |
| 38 | (United States) Townsend Bell | | | | | | 16^{10} | | | | | | | | | | | | 18 |
| 39 | (Brazil) Bruno Junqueira | | | | | | 32^{25} | | | | | | | | | | | | 13 |
| 40 | (United States) Roger Yasukawa | | | | | | | | | | | | | | | | 20 | | 12 |
| — | (United States) Jaques Lazier | | | | | | DNQ | | | | | | | | | | | | 0 |
| — | (United States) A. J. Foyt IV | | | | | | Wth | | | | | | | | | | | | 0 |
| Pos | Driver | SAO | STP | BAR | LBH | KAN | INDY | TMS | IOW | WGL | TOR | EDM | MOH | SON | CHI | KEN | MOT | HOM | Pts |

| Color | Result |
|---|---|
| Gold | Winner |
| Silver | 2nd place |
| Bronze | 3rd place |
| Green | 4th & 5th place |
| Light Blue | 6th–10th place |
| Dark Blue | Finished (Outside Top 10) |
| Purple | Did not finish |
| Red | Did not qualify (DNQ) |
| Brown | Withdrawn (Wth) |
| Black | Disqualified (DSQ) |
| White | Did Not Start (DNS) |
| White | Race abandoned (C) |
| Blank | Did not participate |

**In-line notation**
| **Bold** | Pole position (1 point; except Indy). |
| Italics | Ran fastest race lap |
| * | Led most race laps (2 points) |
| DNS | Any driver who qualifies but does not start (DNS), earns half the points had they taken part. |
| ^{1–33} | Indy 500 qualifying results, with points as follows: 15 points for 1st 13 points for 2nd and so on down to 3 points for 25th to 33rd. |
| ^{c} | Qualifying canceled no bonus point awarded |
RY Rookie of the Year
R Rookie

=== Entrant standings ===
- Based on the entrant, used for oval qualifications order, and starting grids when qualifying is cancelled
- Only full-time entrants, and at-large part-time entrants shown.

| Pos | Driver | SAO | STP | BAR | LBH | KAN | INDY | TMS | IOW | WGL | TOR | EDM | MOH | SON | CHI | KEN | MOT | HOM | Pts |
|---|---|---|---|---|---|---|---|---|---|---|---|---|---|---|---|---|---|---|---|
| 1 | #10 Chip Ganassi Racing | **7*** | 5 | 3 | 12 | 2 | 1*^{3} | 5 | 18* | 3 | 2 | 3 | 1 | 3 | 1 | 5 | 2 | **8*** | 602 |
| 2 | #12 Team Penske | 1 | **1*** | **4** | **3** | 12 | 8^{2} | 14 | **5** | **1*** | 1 | **2*** | **2** | **1*** | 16 | 8 | 3 | 25 | 597 |
| 3 | #9 Chip Ganassi Racing | 6 | 18 | 2 | 4 | 1* | 5^{6} | 4 | 6 | 8 | 20 | 1 | 5 | 2 | 8 | 7 | 6 | 1 | 547 |
| 4 | #3 Team Penske | 9 | 4 | 1 | 7 | 4 | **9**^{1} | 20 | 2 | 9 | 24 | 10 | 3 | 5 | 6 | 1 | **1*** | 5 | 531 |
| 5 | #6 Team Penske | 14 | 3 | 6 | 8 | **6** | 24^{4} | **1*** | 4 | 2 | 18 | 4 | 6 | 4 | **11*** | 24 | 4 | 4 | 482 |
| 6 | #11 Andretti Autosport | 10 | 10 | 8 | 5 | 3 | 11^{32} | 6 | 1 | 21 | 4 | 12 | 17 | 7 | 5 | 4 | 7 | 3 | 453 |
| 7 | #37 Andretti Autosport | 2 | 11 | 12 | 1* | 5 | 18^{17} | 7 | 8 | 7 | 3 | 5 | 10 | 8 | 4 | 21 | 9 | 11 | 445 |
| 8 | #26 Andretti Autosport | 23 | 12 | 5* | 14 | 13 | 3^{16} | 3 | 15 | 13 | 8 | 11 | 9 | 12 | 3 | 6 | 11 | 7 | 392 |
| 9 | #4 Panther Racing | 5 | 20 | 11 | 9 | 15 | 2^{18} | 9 | 11 | 6 | 10 | 20 | 14 | 25 | 2 | 3* | 10 | 9 | 388 |
| 10 | #7 Andretti Autosport | 15 | 7 | 19 | 16 | 11 | 6^{23} | 2 | 10 | 20 | 6 | 15 | 21 | 16 | 14 | 9 | 5 | 2 | 367 |
| 11 | #22 Dreyer & Reinbold Racing | 11 | 2 | 7 | 2 | 18 | 7^{11} | 19 | 24 | 10 | **7*** | 21 | 27 | 6 | 7 | 11 | 16 | 21 | 361 |
| 12 | #14 A. J. Foyt Enterprises | 3 | 15 | 18 | 11 | 10 | 27^{30} | 10 | 7 | 19 | 11 | 16 | 15 | 15 | 9 | 23 | 17 | 6 | 310 |
| 13 | #77 FAZZT Race Team | 19 | 6 | 10 | 21 | 8 | 10^{5} | 18 | 12 | 17 | 17 | 23 | 4* | 14 | 25 | 15 | 13 | 14 | 302 |
| 14 | #2 de Ferran Dragon Racing | 4 | 8 | 14 | 20 | 16 | 29^{12} | 16 | 14 | 4 | 21 | 13 | 7 | 21 | 29 | 16 | 18 | 17 | 290 |
| 15 | #32 KV Racing Technology | 24 | 21 | 13 | 6 | 7 | 31^{13} | 21 | 25 | 5 | 14 | 7 | 12 | 11 | 17 | 18 | 24 | 27 | 287 |
| 16 | #24 Dreyer & Reinbold Racing | 8 | 19 | 9 | 10 | 14 | 19^{15} | 13 | 9 | 14 | 15 | 19 | 16 | 24 | 24 | 12 | 22 | 26 | 270 |
| 17 | #19 Dale Coyne Racing | 18 | 23 | 23 | 19 | 19 | 4^{26} | 8 | 13 | 25 | 23 | 18 | 13 | 10 | 21 | 13 | 21 | 12 | 266 |
| 18 | #8 KV Racing Technology | 12 | 17 | 16 | 15 | 27 | 25^{19} | 11 | 3 | 11 | 19 | 8 | 26 | 19 | 27 | 26 | 15 | 19 | 262 |
| 19 | #06 Newman/Haas Racing | 20 | 14 | 15 | 13 | 23 | 28^{9} | 12 | 20 | 12 | 12 | 17 | 18 | 17 | 13 | 17 | 14 | 20 | 250 |
| 20 | #78 HVM Racing | 16 | 16 | 21 | 17 | 21 | 14^{22} | 24 | 21 | 24 | 9 | 22 | 8 | 13 | 23 | 25 | 23 | 23 | 242 |
| 21 | #34 Conquest Racing | 17 | 13 | 22 | 23 | 22 | 13^{27} | 17 | 16 | 22 | 22 | 24 | 22 | 23 | 12 | 10 | 25 | 15 | 236 |
| 22 | #5 KV Racing Technology | 22 | 22 | 25 | 18 | 24 | 20^{31} | 25 | 19 | 15 | 25 | 9 | 25 | 18 | 26 | 27 | 12 | 18 | 214 |
| 23 | #36 Conquest Racing | | | 20 | 24 | 20 | 22^{24} | 22 | 17 | 18 | 16 | 14 | 11 | 20 | 28 | 14 | 20 | 16 | 202 |
| 24 | #18 Dale Coyne Racing | 21 | 24 | 24 | 25 | 26 | DNQ | 23 | 23 | 23 | 26 | 25 | 23 | 22 | 19 | 19 | 19 | 24 | 184 |
| 25 | #67 Sarah Fisher Racing | | 9 | 17 | 22 | 17 | 26^{29} | 15 | 22 | | | | | | 15 | 22 | | 22 | 139 |
| Pos | Driver | SAO | STP | BAR | LBH | KAN | INDY | TMS | IOW | WGL | TOR | EDM | MOH | SON | CHI | KEN | MOT | HOM | Pts |

== See also ==
- 2010 Indianapolis 500
