= 2010 Honda Indy 200 =

(United States) 2010 Honda Indy 200
Race details
- 12th round of the 2010 IndyCar Series season
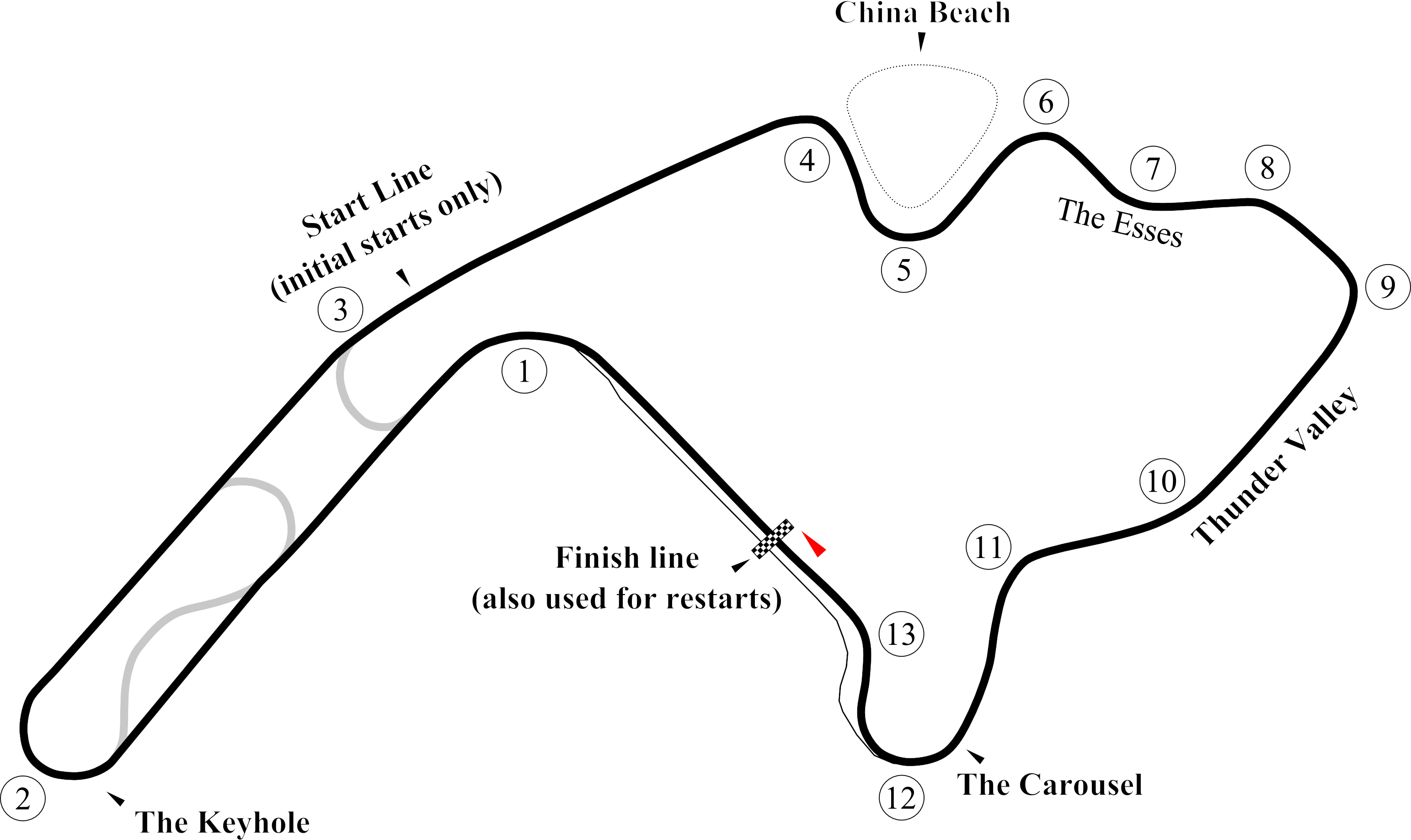
- Date: August 8, 2010
- Official name: Honda 200
- Location: Mid-Ohio Sports Car Course
- Course: Permanent racing facility 2.258 mi / 3.634 km
- Distance: 85 laps 191.930 mi / 308.890 km

Pole position
- Driver: (Australia) Will Power (Team Penske)
- Time: 1:07.1997

Fastest lap
- Driver: (Australia) Ryan Briscoe (Team Penske)
- Time: 1:08.8148 (on lap 54 of 85)

Podium
- First: (United Kingdom) Dario Franchitti (Chip Ganassi Racing)
- Second: (Australia) Will Power (Team Penske)
- Third: (Brazil) Hélio Castroneves (Team Penske)

The 2010 Honda Indy 200 presented by Westfield Insurance was the fourth running of the Honda 200 and the twelfth round of the 2010 IndyCar Series season. It took place on Sunday, August 8, 2010. The race contested over 85 laps at the 2.258-mile (3.634 km) Mid-Ohio Sports Car Course in Lexington, Ohio.

== Classification ==
=== Qualifying ===
Pos	No.	Driver	Team	Group 1	Group 2	Top 12	Fast 6
1	12	(Australia) Will Power	Team Penske	1:07.5823		1:07.1211	1:07.1997
2	10	(United Kingdom) Dario Franchitti	Chip Ganassi Racing		1:07.2318	1:07.1537	1:07.2846
3	5	(Japan) Takuma Sato (R)	KV Racing Technology	1:07.7180		1:07.2160	1:07.4337
4	37	(United States) Ryan Hunter-Reay	Andretti Autosport		1:07.4494	1:07.3573	1:07.4411
5	9	(New Zealand) Scott Dixon	Chip Ganassi Racing		1:07.5758	1:07.2988	1:07.4711
6	3	(Brazil) Hélio Castroneves	Team Penske	1:07.9822		1:07.3094	1:07.5370
7	6	(Australia) Ryan Briscoe	Team Penske	1:07.7000		1:07.4687	
8	8	(Venezuela) E. J. Viso	KV Racing Technology	1:07.9435		1:07.4713	
9	26	(United States) Marco Andretti	Andretti Autosport	1:07.8331		1:07.5436	
10	78	(Switzerland) Simona de Silvestro (R)	HVM Racing		1:07.7303	1:07.6190	
11	22	(United Kingdom) Justin Wilson	Dreyer & Reinbold Racing		1:07.6858	1:07.6230	
12	06	(Japan) Hideki Mutoh	Newman/Haas Racing		1:07.7513	1:07.7491	
13	4	(United Kingdom) Dan Wheldon	Panther Racing	1:08.2415			
14	77	(Canada) Alex Tagliani	FAZZT Race Team		1:07.7789		
15	36	(Belgium) Bertrand Baguette (R)	Conquest Racing	1:08.3069			
16	32	(Brazil) Mario Moraes	KV Racing Technology		1:07.7821		
17	27	(United Kingdom) Adam Carroll (R)	Andretti Autosport	1:08.4825			
18	24	(United States) J. R. Hildebrand (R)	Dreyer & Reinbold Racing		1:07.7943		
19	2	(Brazil) Raphael Matos	de Ferran Dragon Racing	1:08.5386			
20	11	(Brazil) Tony Kanaan	Andretti Autosport		1:07.9321		
21	19	(United Kingdom) Alex Lloyd (R)	Dale Coyne Racing	1:08.7818			
22	7	(United States) Danica Patrick	Andretti Autosport		1:07.9780		
23	34	(Italy) Francesco Dracone (R)	Conquest Racing	1:11.3968			
24	14	(Brazil) Vítor Meira	A. J. Foyt Enterprises		1:08.0414		
25	02	(United States) Graham Rahal	Newman/Haas Racing		1:08.0459		
26	66	(United Kingdom) Jay Howard (R)	Sarah Fisher Racing		1:09.5028		
27	18	(Venezuela) Milka Duno	Dale Coyne Racing	no time			

=== Race ===
Pos	No.	Driver	Team	Laps	Time/Retired	Points
1	10	(United Kingdom) Dario Franchitti	Chip Ganassi Racing	85	1:54:32.2568	50
2	12	(Australia) Will Power	Team Penske	85	1:54:32.7802	41
3	3	(Brazil) Hélio Castroneves	Team Penske	85	1:54:36.3451	35
4	77	(Canada) Alex Tagliani	FAZZT Race Team	85	1:54:37.8991	34
5	9	(New Zealand) Scott Dixon	Chip Ganassi Racing	85	1:54:38.1718	30
6	6	(Australia) Ryan Briscoe	Team Penske	85	1:54:38.7668	28
7	2	(Brazil) Raphael Matos	de Ferran Dragon Racing	85	1:54:39.0086	26
8	78	(Switzerland) Simona de Silvestro (R)	HVM Racing	85	1:54:42.4019	24
9	26	(United States) Marco Andretti	Andretti Autosport	85	1:54:43.2123	22
10	37	(United States) Ryan Hunter-Reay	Andretti Autosport	85	1:54:45.4912	20
11	36	(Belgium) Bertrand Baguette (R)	Conquest Racing	85	1:54:47.0828	19
12	32	(Brazil) Mario Moraes	KV Racing Technology	85	1:54:48.3029	18
13	19	(United Kingdom) Alex Lloyd (R)	Dale Coyne Racing	85	1:54:48.8138	17
14	4	(United Kingdom) Dan Wheldon	Panther Racing	85	1:54:51.6086	16
15	14	(Brazil) Vítor Meira	A. J. Foyt Enterprises	85	1:54:52.3350	15
16	24	(United States) J. R. Hildebrand (R)	Dreyer & Reinbold Racing	85	1:54:52.4737	14
17	11	(Brazil) Tony Kanaan	Andretti Autosport	85	1:54:57.6854	13
18	06	(Japan) Hideki Mutoh	Newman/Haas Racing	85	1:54:58.8486	12
19	27	(United Kingdom) Adam Carroll (R)	Andretti Autosport	85	1:54:59.5870	12
20	02	(United States) Graham Rahal	Newman/Haas Racing	85	1:54:59.8909	12
21	7	(United States) Danica Patrick	Andretti Autosport	85	1:55:00.4667	12
22	34	(Italy) Francesco Dracone (R)	Conquest Racing	82	+3 laps	12
23	18	(Venezuela) Milka Duno	Dale Coyne Racing	81	+4 laps	12
24	66	(United Kingdom) Jay Howard (R)	Sarah Fisher Racing	38	Contact	12
25	5	(Japan) Takuma Sato (R)	KV Racing Technology	28	Contact	10
26	8	(Venezuela) E. J. Viso	KV Racing Technology	22	Contact	10
27	22	(United Kingdom) Justin Wilson	Dreyer & Reinbold Racing	22	Contact	10
OFFICIAL RACE REPORT

Previous race: 2010 Honda Indy Edmonton	IZOD IndyCar Series; 2010 season	Next race: 2010 Indy Grand Prix of Sonoma
Previous race: 2009 Honda 200	2010 Honda 200	Next race: 2011 Honda Indy 200
