= FAZZT Race Team =

Automotive racing team

(United States) FAZZT Race Team
- Founded: August 28, 2009
- Folded: 2011
- Team principal(s): Andre Azzi; Alex Tagliani; Jim Freudenberg
- Current series: IndyCar Series
- Noted drivers: 33. Bruno Junqueira; 77. Alex Tagliani

FAZZT Race Team was an auto racing team started by Montreal entrepreneur Andre Azzi, race car driver Alex Tagliani, and former Kelley Racing co-owner Jim Freudenberg (thus Freudenberg, Azzi, Tagliani).

== Team history ==
The team's history can be traced to Freudenberg and Jason Priestley's Rubicon Race Team fielding an entry into the 2008 Indianapolis 500 with veteran driver Max Papis on March 4 of that year. The car was prepared by the Sam Schmidt Motorsports crew. However, Papis crashed the car during the morning warm up of the third day of qualifying and while the car was repaired for the final day of qualifying, the team failed to find speed and struggled with gearbox problems during Bump Day and failed to make the field.

For the 2009 season, after a failed attempt to field a car with Pacific Coast Motorsports the group was renamed Rubicon Sports Agency and partnered with Conquest Racing to field driver Alex Tagliani for a partial schedule. Both Rubicon and Tagliani left Conquest after the 2009 Rexall Edmonton Indy.

It was announced on August 28, 2009, that Azzi Race Division, ATG, and Rubicon Sports Agency would be fielding a full-time IndyCar Series team beginning in 2010. The combined group purchased all the equipment of Roth Racing including four Dallara chassis and has signed driver Alex Tagliani to a four-year contract with an option for a fifth year. Walker Racing veteran Rob Edwards was signed as team manager with Andre Azzi as CEO and Jim Freudenberg as COO. The team's race shop is in Indianapolis with a proposed additional R&D facility and offices located in Montreal. The team has started a development program for Canadian drivers. In 2010 Maryeve Dufault was announced as the first driver signed to the team's development program.

In June 2010, General Manager Rob Edwards took over the role of COO when Freudenberg left the team and ownership group to pursue another business venture.

The team completed the entire 2010 season with Tagliani in the number 77 car with sponsorship from Bowers & Wilkins. Tagliani finished 13th in points with a best finish of fourth at the Mid-Ohio Sports Car Course, where he also led the most laps. Bruno Junqueira drove a second car for the team in the 2010 Indianapolis 500 and was the fastest second-day qualifier, but he crashed early in the race and was credited with 32nd. Tagliani qualified for the 2010 Indianapolis 500 on the second row in fifth spot and finished 10th.

For 2011, Sam Schmidt Motorsports bought the assets of FAZZT and retained all of the personnel including Tagliani. The team effectively did not run for 2011.

== Racing results ==
=== Complete IndyCar Series results ===
(key)

Year	Chassis	Engine	Drivers	No.	1	2	3	4	5	6	7	8	9	10	11	12	13	14	15	16	17	Pts	Pos
2010					SAO	STP	ALA	LBH	KAN	INDY	TXS	IOW	WGL	TOR	EDM	MOH	SNM	CHI	KTY	MOT	HMS		
2010	Dallara IR5	Honda HI10R V8	(Brazil) Bruno Junqueira	33						32												39th	13
2010	Dallara IR5	Honda HI10R V8	(Canada) Alex Tagliani	77	19	6	10	21	8	10	18	12	17	17	23	4*	14	25	15	13	14	13th	302
