= 2010 Indy Grand Prix of Sonoma =

(United States) 2010 Indy Grand Prix of Sonoma
Race details
- 13th round of the 2010 IndyCar Series season
- Date: August 22, 2010
- Official name: Indy Grand Prix of Sonoma
- Location: Infineon Raceway
- Course: Permanent racing facility 2.303 mi / 3.706 km
- Distance: 75 laps 172.725 mi / 277.950 km
- Weather: 78 °F (26 °C), clear skies

Pole position
- Driver: (Australia) Will Power (Team Penske)
- Time: 1:16.5282

Fastest lap
- Driver: (United States) J. R. Hildebrand (Dreyer & Reinbold Racing)
- Time: 1:19.1564 (on lap 13 of 75)

Podium
- First: (Australia) Will Power (Team Penske)
- Second: (New Zealand) Scott Dixon (Chip Ganassi Racing)
- Third: (United Kingdom) Dario Franchitti (Chip Ganassi Racing)

The 2010 Indy Grand Prix of Sonoma was the sixth running of the Indy Grand Prix of Sonoma and the thirteenth round of the 2010 IndyCar Series season. It took place on Sunday, August 22, 2010. The race contested over 75 laps at the 2.303-mile (3.706 km) Infineon Raceway in Sonoma, California.

== Classification ==
=== Qualifying ===
Pos	No.	Driver	Team	Group 1	Group 2	Top 12	Fast 6
1	12	(Australia) Will Power	Team Penske		1:16.8947	1:16.8072	1:16.5282
2	3	(Brazil) Hélio Castroneves	Team Penske	1:16.7647		1:16.7427	1:16.5652
3	10	(United Kingdom) Dario Franchitti	Chip Ganassi Racing		1:16.9533	1:16.7956	1:16.9437
4	77	(Canada) Alex Tagliani	FAZZT Race Team		1:16.2670	1:16.7979	1:17.2068
5	6	(Australia) Ryan Briscoe	Team Penske	1:17.3501		1:16.9359	1:17.2109
6	9	(New Zealand) Scott Dixon	Chip Ganassi Racing		1:17.1801	1:16.9148	1:17.3470
7	22	(United Kingdom) Justin Wilson	Dreyer & Reinbold Racing	1:17.2911		1:16.9477	
8	37	(United States) Ryan Hunter-Reay	Andretti Autosport	1:17.0638		1:17.1317	
9	11	(Brazil) Tony Kanaan	Andretti Autosport		1:17.3419	1:17.3181	
10	2	(Brazil) Raphael Matos	de Ferran Dragon Racing	1:17.3918		1:17.3710	
11	78	(Switzerland) Simona de Silvestro (R)	HVM Racing	1:17.3030		1:17.7429	
12	4	(United Kingdom) Dan Wheldon	Panther Racing		1:17.4953	1:17.8280	
13	34	(Belgium) Bertrand Baguette (R)	Conquest Racing	1:17.5239			
14	06	(Japan) Hideki Mutoh	Newman/Haas Racing		1:17.5187		
15	8	(Venezuela) E. J. Viso	KV Racing Technology	1:17.6825			
16	02	(United States) Graham Rahal	Newman/Haas Racing		1:17.5284		
17	5	(Japan) Takuma Sato (R)	KV Racing Technology	1:17.7112			
18	26	(United States) Marco Andretti	Andretti Autosport		1:17.6216		
19	24	(United States) J. R. Hildebrand (R)	Dreyer & Reinbold Racing	1:17.7659			
20	32	(Brazil) Mario Moraes	KV Racing Technology		1:17.7533		
21	14	(Brazil) Vítor Meira	A. J. Foyt Enterprises	1:17.9149			
22	19	(United Kingdom) Alex Lloyd (R)	Dale Coyne Racing		1:18.0423		
23	7	(United States) Danica Patrick	Andretti Autosport	1:18.3995			
24	18	(Venezuela) Milka Duno	Dale Coyne Racing		1:22.2980		
25	36	(Italy) Francesco Dracone (R)	Conquest Racing	1:21.2262			

=== Race ===
Pos	No.	Driver	Team	Laps	Time/Retired	Points
1	12	(Australia) Will Power	Team Penske	75	1:52:34.1915	53
2	9	(New Zealand) Scott Dixon	Chip Ganassi Racing	75	1:52:34.9347	40
3	10	(United Kingdom) Dario Franchitti	Chip Ganassi Racing	75	1:52:40.8047	35
4	6	(Australia) Ryan Briscoe	Team Penske	75	1:52:42.0552	32
5	3	(Brazil) Hélio Castroneves	Team Penske	75	1:52:44.6509	30
6	22	(United Kingdom) Justin Wilson	Dreyer & Reinbold Racing	75	1:52:45.1010	28
7	11	(Brazil) Tony Kanaan	Andretti Autosport	75	1:52:45.7161	26
8	37	(United States) Ryan Hunter-Reay	Andretti Autosport	75	1:52:46.0853	24
9	02	(United States) Graham Rahal	Newman/Haas Racing	75	1:52:41.6934	22
10	19	(United Kingdom) Alex Lloyd (R)	Dale Coyne Racing	75	1:52:52.3984	20
11	32	(Brazil) Mario Moraes	KV Racing Technology	75	1:52:54.4326	19
12	26	(United States) Marco Andretti	Andretti Autosport	75	1:52:54.8674	18
13	78	(Switzerland) Simona de Silvestro (R)	HVM Racing	75	1:52:56.0154	17
14	77	(Canada) Alex Tagliani	FAZZT Race Team	75	1:52:56.6773	16
15	14	(Brazil) Vítor Meira	A. J. Foyt Enterprises	75	1:52:58.4794	15
16	7	(United States) Danica Patrick	Andretti Autosport	75	1:53:20.3254	14
17	06	(Japan) Hideki Mutoh	Newman/Haas Racing	74	+1 lap	13
18	5	(Japan) Takuma Sato (R)	KV Racing Technology	74	+1 lap	12
19	8	(Venezuela) E. J. Viso	KV Racing Technology	74	+1 lap	12
20	36	(Italy) Francesco Dracone (R)	Conquest Racing	71	Contact	12
21	2	(Brazil) Raphael Matos	de Ferran Dragon Racing	67	Contact	12
22	18	(Venezuela) Milka Duno	Dale Coyne Racing	67	+8 laps	12
23	34	(Belgium) Bertrand Baguette (R)	Conquest Racing	65	Contact	12
24	24	(United States) J. R. Hildebrand (R)	Dreyer & Reinbold Racing	38	Contact	12
25	4	(United Kingdom) Dan Wheldon	Panther Racing	0	Contact	10
OFFICIAL RACE REPORT

Previous race: 2010 Honda Indy 200	IZOD IndyCar Series; 2010 season	Next race: 2010 Peak Antifreeze & Motor Oil Indy 300
Previous race: 2009 Indy Grand Prix of Sonoma	2010 Indy Grand Prix of Sonoma	Next race: 2011 Indy Grand Prix of Sonoma
