= 2010 Camping World Grand Prix at The Glen =

(United States) 2010 Camping World Watkins Glen Grand Prix
Race details
- 9th round of the 2010 IndyCar Series season
- Date: July 4, 2010
- Official name: Camping World Watkins Glen Grand Prix
- Location: Watkins Glen International
- Course: Permanent racing facility 3.370 mi / 5.423 km
- Distance: 60 laps 202.200 mi / 325.409 km
- Weather: 87 °F (31 °C), clear skies

Pole position
- Driver: (Australia) Will Power (Team Penske)
- Time: 01:29.3164 seconds

Fastest lap
- Driver: (Australia) Will Power (Team Penske)
- Time: 91.0496 (on lap 35 of 60)

Podium
- First: (Australia) Will Power (Team Penske)
- Second: (Australia) Ryan Briscoe (Team Penske)
- Third: (United Kingdom) Dario Franchitti (Chip Ganassi Racing)

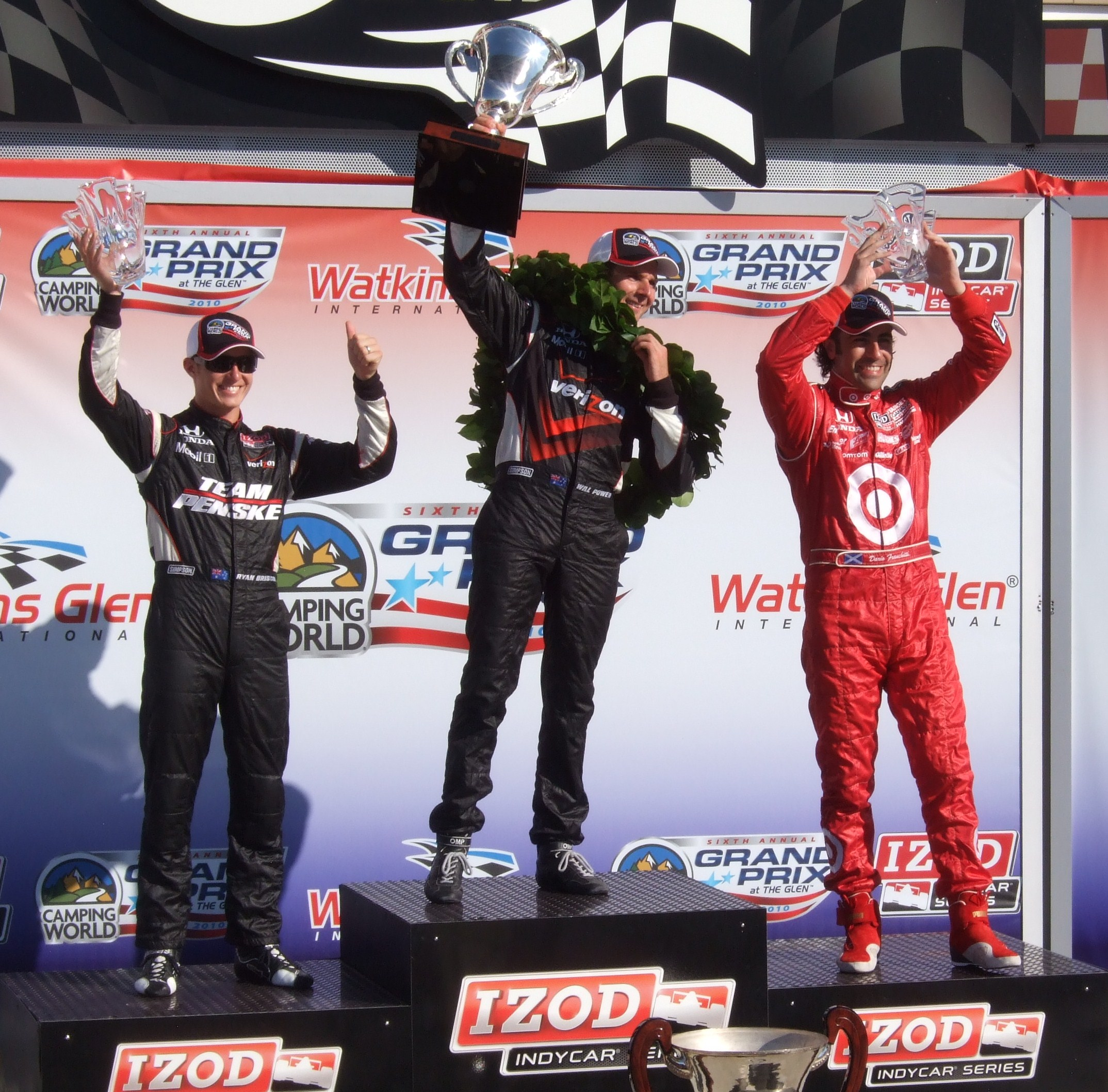
Podium of IZOD IndyCar July 4th 2010 race

The 2010 Camping World Watkins Glen Grand Prix was the eighth running of the Camping World Watkins Glen Grand Prix and the ninth round of the 2010 IndyCar Series season. It took place on Sunday, July 4, 2010. The race was contested over 60 laps at the 3.40-mile (5.47 km) Watkins Glen International in Watkins Glen, New York, and was televised by ABC in the United States. Will Power, driving for Team Penske, took the pole and the win. Ryan Briscoe was second and Dario Franchitti third.

== Classification ==
=== Qualifying ===
Pos	No.	Driver	Team	Group 1	Group 2	Top 12	Fast 6
1	12	(Australia) Will Power	Team Penske		1:30.5901	1:29.5910	1:29.3164
2	3	(Brazil) Hélio Castroneves	Team Penske	1:30.4680		1:29.6068	1:29.4609
3	6	(Australia) Ryan Briscoe	Team Penske	1:30.5957		1:29.9022	1:29.9346
4	10	(United Kingdom) Dario Franchitti	Chip Ganassi Racing		1:30.0390	1:29.7274	1:29.9601
5	5	(Japan) Takuma Sato	KV Racing Technology		1:30.7170	1:30.0428	1:30.1410
6	22	(United Kingdom) Justin Wilson	Dreyer & Reinbold Racing	1:30.7007		1:29.9652	1:30.2667
7	9	(New Zealand) Scott Dixon	Chip Ganassi Racing		1:30.4902	1:30.1389	
8	26	(United States) Marco Andretti	Andretti Autosport	1:30.5383		1:30.2042	
9	32	(Brazil) Mario Moraes	KV Racing Technology	1:30.8948		1:30.2644	
10	27	(United Kingdom) Adam Carroll	Andretti Autosport	1:30.7475		1:30.4886	
11	2	(Brazil) Raphael Matos	Luczo Dragon Racing de Ferran Motorsports		1:30.9383	1:30.5276	
12	24	(Canada) Paul Tracy	Dreyer & Reinbold Racing		1:30.9108	1:30.8414	
13	11	(Brazil) Tony Kanaan	Andretti Autosport	1:31.1934			
14	06	(Japan) Hideki Mutoh	Newman/Haas/Lanigan Racing		1:31.1723		
15	78	(Switzerland) Simona de Silvestro	HVM Racing	1:31.3268			
16	37	(United States) Ryan Hunter-Reay	Andretti Autosport		1:31.4333		
17	14	(Brazil) Vítor Meira	A. J. Foyt Enterprises	1:31.4088			
18	34	(Brazil) Mario Romancini	Conquest Racing		1:31.5797		
19	77	(Canada) Alex Tagliani	FAZZT Race Team	1:31.5218			
20	4	(United Kingdom) Dan Wheldon	Panther Racing		1:31.5988		
21	7	(United States) Danica Patrick	Andretti Autosport	1:31.5329			
22	19	(United Kingdom) Alex Lloyd (R)	Dale Coyne Racing		1:33.9832		
23	36	(Belgium) Bertrand Baguette	Conquest Racing	1:32.1888			
24	18	(Venezuela) Milka Duno	Dale Coyne Racing		1:40.4911		
25	8	(Venezuela) E. J. Viso	KV Racing Technology		No Time		

=== Race ===
Pos	No.	Driver	Team	Laps	Time/Retired	Grid	Laps Led	Points
1	12	(Australia) Will Power	Team Penske	60	1:40:27.4391	1	45	53^{1}
2	6	(Australia) Ryan Briscoe	Team Penske	60	+1.2181	3	4	40
3	10	(United Kingdom) Dario Franchitti	Chip Ganassi Racing	60	+2.6754	4	1	35
4	2	(Brazil) Raphael Matos	Luczo Dragon Racing de Ferran Motorsports	60	+8.0208	11	0	32
5	32	(Brazil) Mario Moraes	KV Racing Technology	60	+9.3229	9	0	30
6	4	(United Kingdom) Dan Wheldon	Panther Racing	60	+9.7523	20	0	28
7	37	(United States) Ryan Hunter-Reay	Andretti Autosport	60	+10.5003	16	0	26
8	9	(New Zealand) Scott Dixon	Chip Ganassi Racing	60	+12.0546	7	10	24
9	3	(Brazil) Hélio Castroneves	Team Penske	60	+12.9834	2	0	22
10	22	(United Kingdom) Justin Wilson	Dreyer & Reinbold Racing	60	+13.5635	6	0	20
11	8	(Venezuela) E. J. Viso	KV Racing Technology	60	+18.7591	25	0	19
12	06	(Japan) Hideki Mutoh	Newman/Haas/Lanigan Racing	60	+20.2279	14	0	18
13	26	(United States) Marco Andretti	Andretti Autosport	60	+26.6965	8	0	17
14	24	(Canada) Paul Tracy	Dreyer & Reinbold Racing	60	+27.7310	12	0	16
15	5	(Japan) Takuma Sato	KV Racing Technology	60	+28.8774	5	0	15
16	27	(United Kingdom) Adam Carroll	Andretti Autosport	60	+29.3624	10	0	14
17	77	(Canada) Alex Tagliani	FAZZT Race Team	60	+35.3753	19	0	13
18	36	(Belgium) Bertrand Baguette	Conquest Racing	60	+36.5350	23	0	12
19	14	(Brazil) Vítor Meira	A. J. Foyt Enterprises	60	+36.9869	17	0	12
20	7	(United States) Danica Patrick	Andretti Autosport	60	+38.2675	21	0	12
21	11	(Brazil) Tony Kanaan	Andretti Autosport	60	+38.6700	13	0	12
22	34	(Brazil) Mario Romancini	Conquest Racing	59	+1 lap	18	0	12
23	18	(Venezuela) Milka Duno	Dale Coyne Racing	57	+3 laps	24	0	12
24	78	(Switzerland) Simona de Silvestro	HVM Racing	38	Contact	15	0	12
25	19	(United Kingdom) Alex Lloyd (R)	Dale Coyne Racing	22	Mechanical	22	0	10
OFFICIAL RACE REPORT

Notes

- ^1 – Includes two points for pole position and one point for fastest lap.

== Championship standings after the race ==
Drivers' Championship standings

Pos	Driver	Points
1	(Australia) Will Power	326
2	(United Kingdom) Dario Franchitti	295
3	(New Zealand) Scott Dixon	287
4	(Australia) Ryan Briscoe	280
5	(Brazil) Hélio Castroneves	273

- Note: Only the top five positions are included.

Previous race: 2010 Iowa Corn Indy 250	IndyCar Series; 2010 season	Next race: 2010 Honda Indy Toronto
Previous race: 2009 Camping World Grand Prix at the Glen	2010 Watkins Glen Indy Grand Prix	Next race: 2016 IndyCar Grand Prix at The Glen
