= 2010 Iowa Corn Indy 250 =

(United States) 2010 Iowa Corn Indy 250
Race details
- 8th round of the 2010 IndyCar Series season
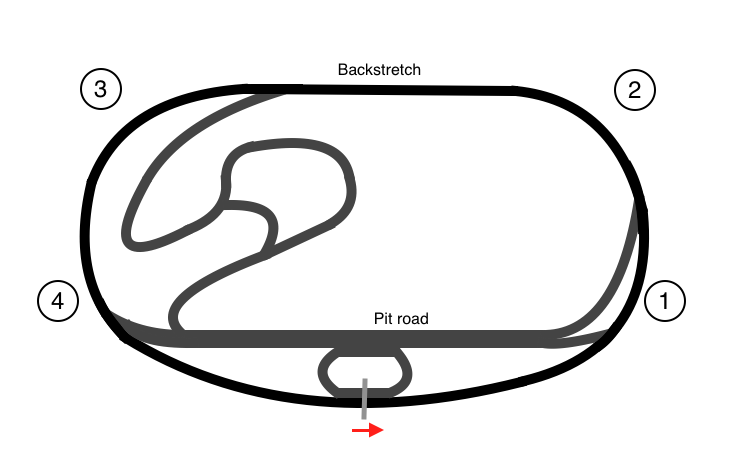
- Date: June 20, 2010
- Official name: Iowa Corn Indy 250
- Location: Iowa Speedway
- Course: Permanent racing facility 0.875 mi / 1.4 km
- Distance: 250 laps 218.75 mi / 352.044 km

Pole position
- Driver: (Australia) Will Power (Team Penske)
- Time: 1:10.9925 (4-lap)

Fastest lap
- Driver: (United Kingdom) Dario Franchitti (Chip Ganassi Racing)
- Time: 17.9696 (on lap 21 of 250)

Podium
- First: (Brazil) Tony Kanaan (Andretti Autosport)
- Second: (Brazil) Hélio Castroneves (Team Penske)
- Third: (Venezuela) E. J. Viso (KV Racing Technology)

The 2010 Iowa Corn Indy 250 was the fourth running of the Iowa Corn Indy 250 and the eighth round of the 2010 IndyCar Series season. It took place on Sunday, June 20, 2010. The race was contested over 250 laps at the 0.875-mile (1.408 km) Iowa Speedway in Newton, Iowa, and was telecasted by Versus in the United States.

The winner of the 2010 Iowa Corn Indy 250 was Tony Kanaan. Will Power held the pole position running a time of 1:10.9925 seconds, while Dario Franchitti had the fastest lap running lap 21 in 17.9696 seconds. Hélio Castroneves finished in second, while E. J. Viso came in third place.

== Classification ==
=== Qualifying ===
Pos	No.	Driver	Team	Lap 1	Lap 2	Lap 3	Lap 4	Total
1	12	(Australia) Will Power	Team Penske	17.7742	17.7316	17.7249	17.7618	1:10.9925
2	9	(New Zealand) Scott Dixon	Chip Ganassi Racing	17.7619	17.7632	17.7386	17.7308	1:10.9945
3	26	(United States) Marco Andretti	Andretti Autosport	17.7851	17.8050	17.7894	17.7435	1:11.1230
4	3	(Brazil) Hélio Castroneves	Team Penske	17.8620	17.7794	17.7589	17.7703	1:11.1706
5	10	(United Kingdom) Dario Franchitti	Chip Ganassi Racing	17.8365	17.7961	17.7839	17.7640	1:11.1805
6	77	(Canada) Alex Tagliani	FAZZT Race Team	17.8957	17.7484	17.7714	17.7680	1:11.1835
7	5	(Japan) Takuma Sato (R)	KV Racing Technology	17.8595	17.8067	17.7803	17.8076	1:11.2541
8	6	(Australia) Ryan Briscoe	Team Penske	17.8577	17.8136	17.7928	17.7900	1:11.2541
9	7	(United States) Danica Patrick	Andretti Autosport	18.0095	17.9042	17.8215	17.7511	1:11.4863
10	4	(United Kingdom) Dan Wheldon	Panther Racing	17.9445	17.8764	17.8696	17.8686	1:11.5591
11	22	(United Kingdom) Justin Wilson	Dreyer & Reinbold Racing	17.9749	17.8577	17.8596	17.8774	1:11.5696
12	37	(United States) Ryan Hunter-Reay	Andretti Autosport	17.9574	17.9304	17.9041	17.8612	1:11.6531
13	14	(Brazil) Vítor Meira	A. J. Foyt Enterprises	17.9859	17.9016	17.8925	17.8933	1:11.6733
14	19	(United Kingdom) Alex Lloyd (R)	Dale Coyne Racing	18.0464	17.9505	17.8912	17.8846	1:11.7727
15	11	(Brazil) Tony Kanaan	Andretti Autosport	18.0535	17.9584	17.9465	17.9174	1:11.8758
16	32	(Brazil) Mario Moraes	KV Racing Technology	18.0525	17.9708	17.9594	17.9473	1:11.9300
17	24	(United States) Graham Rahal	Dreyer & Reinbold Racing	18.1950	18.0722	17.9887	17.9413	1:12.1972
18	67	(United States) Sarah Fisher	Sarah Fisher Racing	18.1639	18.0141	18.0362	18.0343	1:12.2485
19	8	(Venezuela) E. J. Viso	KV Racing Technology	18.1564	18.0339	18.0692	18.0272	1:12.2867
20	78	(Switzerland) Simona de Silvestro (R)	HVM Racing	18.1887	18.0920	18.0440	18.0318	1:12.3565
21	2	(Brazil) Raphael Matos	De Ferran Dragon Racing	18.3031	18.0642	18.0223	17.9982	1:12.3878
22	36	(Belgium) Bertrand Baguette (R)	Conquest Racing	18.2643	18.1601	18.1084	18.1075	1:12.6403
23	34	(Brazil) Mario Romancini (R)	Conquest Racing	18.2839	18.3804	18.1272	18.1732	1:12.9647
24	06	(Japan) Hideki Mutoh	Newman/Haas Racing	18.6807	18.4339	18.5388	18.5595	1:14.2129
25	18	(Venezuela) Milka Duno	Dale Coyne Racing					No Time
OFFICIAL QUALIFICATIONS REPORT

=== Race ===
Pos	No.	Driver	Team	Laps	Time/Retired	Grid	Laps Led	Points
1	11	(Brazil) Tony Kanaan	Andretti Autosport	250	1:42:12.4036	15	62	50
2	3	(Brazil) Hélio Castroneves	Team Penske	250	+ 4.2030	4	43	40
3	8	(Venezuela) E. J. Viso	KV Racing Technology	250	+ 5.2538	19	0	35
4	6	(Australia) Ryan Briscoe	Team Penske	250	+ 9.0536	8	0	32
5	12	(Australia) Will Power	Team Penske	250	+ 9.5902	1	32	31
6	9	(New Zealand) Scott Dixon	Chip Ganassi Racing	250	+ 15.2683	2	21	28
7	14	(Brazil) Vítor Meira	A. J. Foyt Enterprises	250	+ 16.8703	13	0	26
8	37	(United States) Ryan Hunter-Reay	Andretti Autosport	249	+ 1 Lap	9	0	24
9	24	(United States) Graham Rahal	Dreyer & Reinbold Racing	249	+ 1 Lap	17	11	22
10	7	(United States) Danica Patrick	Andretti Autosport	249	+ 1 Lap	9	0	20
11	4	(United Kingdom) Dan Wheldon	Panther Racing	249	+ 1 Lap	10	0	19
12	77	(Canada) Alex Tagliani	FAZZT Race Team	248	+ 2 Laps	14	0	18
13	19	(United Kingdom) Alex Lloyd (R)	Dale Coyne Racing	248	+ 2 Laps	14	0	17
14	2	(Brazil) Raphael Matos	De Ferran Dragon Racing	247	+ 3 Laps	21	0	16
15	26	(United States) Marco Andretti	Andretti Autosport	244	+ 6 Laps	3	12	15
16	34	(Brazil) Mario Romancini (R)	Conquest Racing	244	+ 6 Laps	23	0	14
17	36	(Belgium) Bertrand Baguette (R)	Conquest Racing	237	+ 13 Laps	22	0	13
18	10	(United Kingdom) Dario Franchitti	Chip Ganassi Racing	212	+ 38 Laps	5	69	14
19	5	(Japan) Takuma Sato (R)	KV Racing Technology	177	Contact	7	0	12
20	06	(Japan) Hideki Mutoh	Newman/Haas Racing	131	Handling	24	0	12
21	78	(Switzerland) Simona de Silvestro (R)	HVM Racing	128	Handling	20	0	12
22	67	(United States) Sarah Fisher	Sarah Fisher Racing	92	Contact	18	0	12
23	18	(Venezuela) Milka Duno	Dale Coyne Racing	31	Handling	25	0	12
24	22	(United Kingdom) Justin Wilson	Dreyer & Reinbold Racing	0	Contact	11	0	12
25	32	(Brazil) Mario Moraes	KV Racing Technology	0	Contact	16	0	10
OFFICIAL RACE REPORT

== Championship standings after the race ==
Drivers' Championship standings

Pos	Driver	Points
1	(Australia) Will Power	274
2	(New Zealand) Scott Dixon	263
3	(United Kingdom) Dario Franchitti	260
4	(Brazil) Hélio Castroneves	251
5	(Australia) Ryan Briscoe	240

- Note: Only the top five positions are included.

Previous race: 2010 Firestone 550	IZOD IndyCar Series; 2010 season	Next race: 2010 Camping World Grand Prix at The Glen
Previous race: 2009 Iowa Corn Indy 250	2010 Iowa Corn Indy 250	Next race: 2011 Iowa Corn Indy 250
