= 2010 Indy Grand Prix of Alabama =

(United States) 2010 Alabama
Race details
- 3rd round of the 2010 IndyCar Series season
- Date: April 11, 2010
- Official name: Indy Grand Prix of Alabama
- Location: Barber Motorsports Park, Birmingham, Alabama
- Course: Road course 2.300 mi / 3.700 km
- Distance: 90 laps 207.000 mi / 333.000 km
- Weather: 77 °F (25 °C), clear skies

Pole position
- Driver: (Australia) Will Power (Team Penske)
- Time: 1:10.1356

Fastest lap
- Driver: (United Kingdom) Justin Wilson (Dreyer & Reinbold Racing)
- Time: 1:12.7853 (on lap 53 of 90)

Podium
- First: (Brazil) Hélio Castroneves (Team Penske)
- Second: (New Zealand) Scott Dixon (Chip Ganassi Racing)
- Third: (United Kingdom) Dario Franchitti (Chip Ganassi Racing)

The 2010 Indy Grand Prix of Alabama was the third race of the 2010 IZOD IndyCar Series season. The race took place on April 11, on the 2.300-mile (3.701 km) road course in Birmingham, Alabama, and was telecast by Versus in the United States.

== Report ==
=== Race ===
NBA Hall of Famer Charles Barkley waved the green flag over the inaugural Indy Grand Prix of Alabama. Points leader Will Power, looking for his third win in a row led from pole followed by Mike Conway. Scott Dixon was ordered to relinquish third and fourth places to Hélio Castroneves and Marco Andretti respectively after being judged to have jumped the start. Replays showed that he reached the start line before Castroneves, after having started behind him. The first yellow flag was displayed on lap 12 for Japanese ex-Formula One driver Takuma Sato, who stopped on-course in Turn 13 after a throttle failure.

During the yellow, many drivers decided to pit, including Power and Conway from first and second, but others decided to stay out, led by Castroneves and Andretti. Conway beat Power out of pit road but was ordered to give the position back after replays showed that Power had reached the pit lane blend line before Conway. On the restart, Andretti took the lead into Turn 5, and the leading quartet of Andretti, Castroneves, Dixon and Dario Franchitti rapidly distanced themselves from the rest of the field. Simona de Silvestro ran an impressive fifth, unable to keep pace with the top four but well ahead of sixth-placed Alex Lloyd. The drivers who had pitted under the caution, including Power, Conway, Ryan Briscoe and Justin Wilson were all stuck in the mid-pack.

Andretti was the first of the leaders to make his first pit stop and he did so on lap 29. Castroneves and Dixon went two and one laps longer, respectively, but rejoined behind Andretti after their stops. The pace of the top three was such that Andretti, Castroneves and Dixon were still first, second and third after their stops, still ahead of Tony Kanaan, Will Power and the others who had stopped before or during the yellow. Franchitti moved back to fourth after Kanaan and Power pitted, but was now 7 seconds behind the leaders. Power rejoined sixth, and set about chasing down fifth-placed Simona de Silvestro. He passed her on lap 48 to take fifth, but he was 21 seconds behind fourth-placed Franchitti and 28 behind the lead trio.

The leaders continued on in the same order as before, with Andretti making his second stop on lap 57 whereas Castroneves made his on lap 61, and Dixon on lap 60. This cycled Andretti back to the lead but, unlike Castroneves and Dixon, he did not have enough fuel on board to take him to the end. Andretti had now begun to hit traffic as the leaders began to lap the drivers at the tail of the field. This allowed both Castroneves and Dixon to close right up to Andretti, but Andretti was able to resist the pressure and keep them behind him. However, he was forced to make a quick fuel stop on Lap 82 and thus hand over the lead to Castroneves after having led for 58 laps. He rejoined fifth behind Franchitti and Power.

On lap 85, with five laps left, Simona de Silvestro spun her HVM Racing car in Turn 5, apparently stalling the engine. This brought out a full-course caution and bunched the field up. Dixon was right behind Castroneves, but third-placed Franchitti had many lapped cars in between him and the lead duo. When the green flew, it left a two-lap shootout to the finish. Castroneves finished half a second ahead of Dixon and took his 17th Indy Racing League win, and was the 23rd of his career. He broke a tie with Emerson Fittipaldi to become the winningest Brazilian driver in IndyCar history. It was also his first win as a father, as he held his daughter Mikaella in victory lane. Franchitti held Power off to take third, and Andretti had to make do with fifth. Ryan Briscoe finished sixth in the third Penske car, with Justin Wilson, Tony Kanaan, Mike Conway and Alex Tagliani rounding off the top 10. Remarkably, all 25 starters were running at the finish; 25th place runner Sato finished 22 laps behind the leaders after the KV mechanics repaired his car.

== Classification ==
=== Qualifying ===
- All cars were split into two groups of twelve, with the fastest six from each group going through to the "top 12" session. In this session, the fastest six cars progressed to the "Firestone Fast Six". The fastest driver in the final session claimed pole, with the rest of the cars lining up in session order, regardless of qualifying times. (fast six from 1–6, top 12 from 7–12 and round 1 from 13–25, with group 1 drivers occupying the odd–numbered grid positions, and group 2 drivers occupying the even–numbered grid positions.

Pos	No.	Driver	Team	Group 1	Group 2	Top 12	Fast 6
1	12	(Australia) Will Power	Team Penske		1:10.2595	1:10.1060	1:10.1356
2	24	(United Kingdom) Mike Conway	Dreyer & Reinbold Racing	1:10.7447		1:10.5581	1:10.6501
3	3	(Brazil) Hélio Castroneves	Team Penske	1:10.6187		1:10.4723	1:10.6569
4	26	(United States) Marco Andretti	Andretti Autosport	1:10.8752		1:10.4171	1:11.0701
5	9	(New Zealand) Scott Dixon	Chip Ganassi Racing		1:10.5937	1:10.6278	1:11.3557
6	5	(Japan) Takuma Sato (R)	KV Racing Technology		1:10.3985	1:10.5646	1:11.4387
7	10	(United Kingdom) Dario Franchitti	Chip Ganassi Racing	1:10.5337		1:10.6307	
8	11	(Brazil) Tony Kanaan	Andretti Autosport	1:10.9417		1:10.6903	
9	6	(Australia) Ryan Briscoe	Team Penske		1:10.7205	1:10.7602	
10	8	(Venezuela) E. J. Viso	KV Racing Technology		1:10.6449	1:10.7757	
11	22	(United Kingdom) Justin Wilson	Dreyer & Reinbold Racing		1:10.7389	1:10.7760	
12	32	(Brazil) Mario Moraes	KV Racing Technology	1:11.0035		1:11.5219	
13	78	(Switzerland) Simona de Silvestro (R)	HVM Racing	1:11.0262			
14	37	(United States) Ryan Hunter-Reay	Andretti Autosport		1:10.7449		
15	67	(United States) Graham Rahal	Sarah Fisher Racing	1:11.1495			
16	19	(United Kingdom) Alex Lloyd (R)	Dale Coyne Racing		1:10.9524		
17	06	(Japan) Hideki Mutoh	Newman/Haas/Lanigan Racing	1:11.2855			
18	2	(Brazil) Raphael Matos	Luczo Dragon Racing de Ferran Motorsports		1:11.0507		
19	7	(United States) Danica Patrick	Andretti Autosport	1:11.5340			
20	14	(Brazil) Vítor Meira	A. J. Foyt Enterprises		1:11.1348		
21	77	(Canada) Alex Tagliani	FAZZT Race Team	1:11.5669			
22	34	(Brazil) Mario Romancini (R)	Conquest Racing		1:11.6020		
23	4	(United Kingdom) Dan Wheldon	Panther Racing	1:11.6095			
24	18	(Venezuela) Milka Duno	Dale Coyne Racing		1:15.1422		
25	36	(Belgium) Bertrand Baguette (R)	Conquest Racing	1:11.9800			

=== Race ===
Pos	No.	Driver	Team	Laps	Time/Retired	Grid	Laps Led	Points
1	3	(Brazil) Hélio Castroneves	Team Penske	90	1:56:41.3928	3	20	50
2	9	(New Zealand) Scott Dixon	Chip Ganassi Racing	90	+ 0.5703	5	0	40
3	10	(United Kingdom) Dario Franchitti	Chip Ganassi Racing	90	+ 8.1590	7	0	35
4	12	(Australia) Will Power	Team Penske	90	+ 8.6639	1	12	33
5	26	(United States) Marco Andretti	Andretti Autosport	90	+ 9.7410	4	58	32
6	6	(Australia) Ryan Briscoe	Team Penske	90	+ 10.9611	9	0	28
7	22	(United Kingdom) Justin Wilson	Dreyer & Reinbold Racing	90	+ 11.5478	11	0	26
8	11	(Brazil) Tony Kanaan	Andretti Autosport	90	+ 12.8533	8	0	24
9	24	(United Kingdom) Mike Conway	Dreyer & Reinbold Racing	90	+ 13.3162	2	0	22
10	77	(Canada) Alex Tagliani	FAZZT Race Team	90	+ 14.8450	21	0	20
11	4	(United Kingdom) Dan Wheldon	Panther Racing	90	+ 15.2007	23	0	19
12	37	(United States) Ryan Hunter-Reay	Andretti Autosport	90	+ 15.6727	14	0	18
13	32	(Brazil) Mario Moraes	KV Racing Technology	90	+ 16.7242	12	0	17
14	2	(Brazil) Raphael Matos	Luczo Dragon Racing de Ferran Motorsports	89	+ 1 Lap	18	0	16
15	06	(Japan) Hideki Mutoh	Newman/Haas/Lanigan Racing	89	+ 1 Lap	17	0	15
16	8	(Venezuela) E. J. Viso	KV Racing Technology	89	+ 1 Lap	10	0	14
17	67	(United States) Graham Rahal	Sarah Fisher Racing	89	+ 1 Lap	15	0	13
18	14	(Brazil) Vítor Meira	A. J. Foyt Enterprises	89	+ 1 Lap	20	0	12
19	7	(United States) Danica Patrick	Andretti Autosport	89	+ 1 Lap	19	0	12
20	36	(Belgium) Bertrand Baguette (R)	Conquest Racing	89	+ 1 Lap	25	0	12
21	78	(Switzerland) Simona de Silvestro (R)	HVM Racing	89	+ 1 Lap	13	0	12
22	34	(Brazil) Mario Romancini (R)	Conquest Racing	89	+ 1 Lap	22	0	12
23	19	(United Kingdom) Alex Lloyd (R)	Dale Coyne Racing	89	+ 1 Lap	16	0	12
24	18	(Venezuela) Milka Duno	Dale Coyne Racing	86	+ 4 Laps	24	0	12
25	5	(Japan) Takuma Sato (R)	KV Racing Technology	68	+ 22 Laps	6	0	10
OFFICIAL RACE REPORT

== Championship standings after the race ==
Drivers' Championship standings

Pos	Driver	Points
1	(Australia) Will Power	136
2	(Brazil) Hélio Castroneves	104
3	(United Kingdom) Dario Franchitti	94
4	(United Kingdom) Justin Wilson	85
5	(New Zealand) Scott Dixon	80

- Note: Only the top five positions are included.

Previous race: 2010 Honda Grand Prix of St. Petersburg	IZOD IndyCar Series; 2010 season	Next race: 2010 Toyota Grand Prix of Long Beach
Previous race: None	Indy Grand Prix of Alabama	Next race: 2011 Indy Grand Prix of Alabama
