= 2009 IndyCar Series =

American auto racing season

2009 IndyCar season
- IndyCar Series

Season
- Races: 17 (18 planned)
- Start date: April 5
- End date: October 10

Awards
- Drivers' champion: (United Kingdom) Dario Franchitti
- Rookie of the Year: (Brazil) Raphael Matos
- Indianapolis 500 winner: (Brazil) Hélio Castroneves

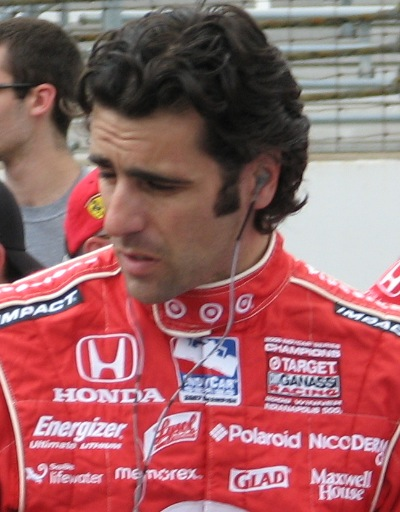
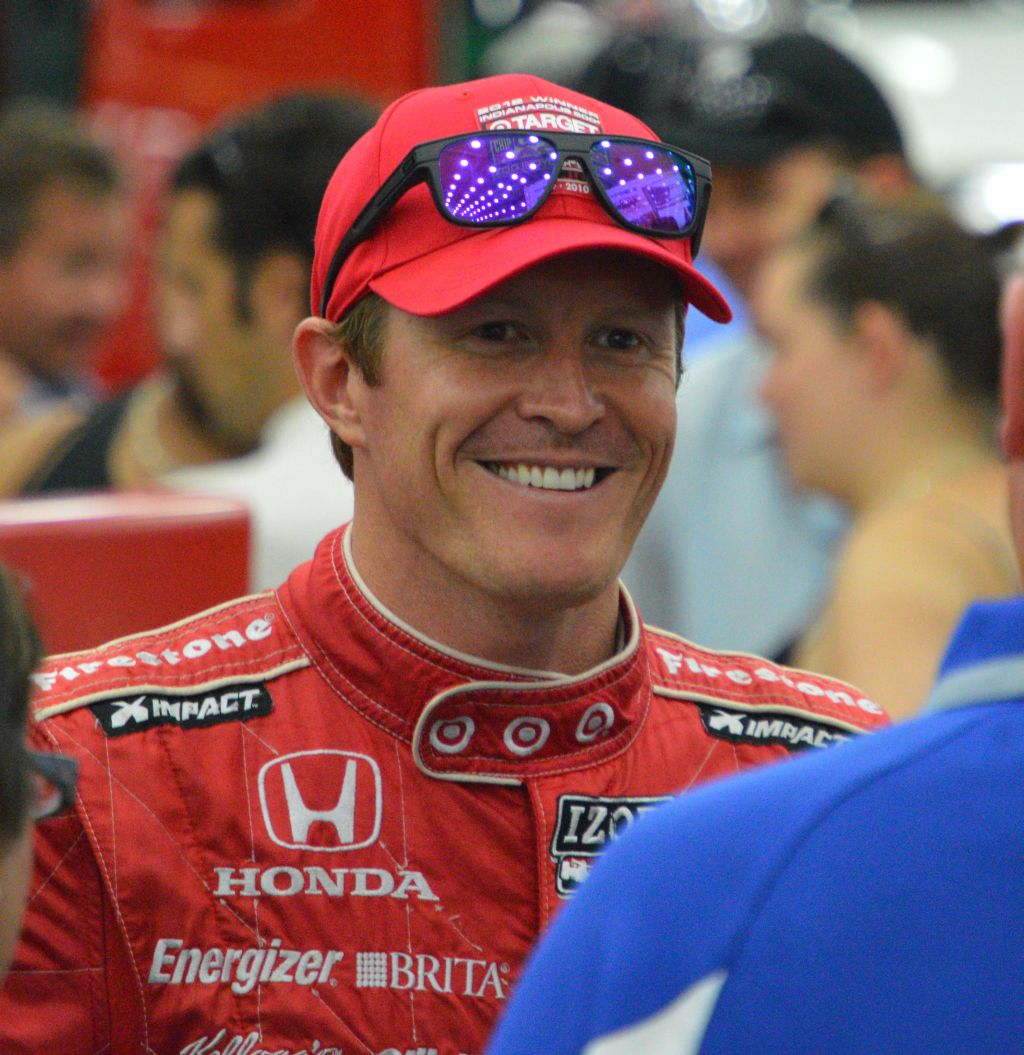
Dario Franchitti (left) won his second Drivers' Championship while Scott Dixon (right) finished second in the championship.

The 2009 IndyCar Series was the 14th season of the IndyCar Series. The 17-race season began on April 5, and its premier event, the 93rd Indianapolis 500 was held May 24. All races were broadcast on ABC or Versus in high-definition. It represented the 98th recognized season of top-level American open wheel racing.

On July 30, 2008, the 2009 schedule for the IndyCar Series was officially released. New to the schedule were Long Beach and Toronto, with Nashville having been removed to make way for the new events.

Dario Franchitti won his second IndyCar Series championship, putting a disappointing foray into NASCAR in 2008 behind him. Franchitti took his Chip Ganassi Racing Dallara-Honda to victory at Long Beach, Iowa Speedway, Toronto and Infineon Raceway in a season long battle with his Chip Ganassi teammate Scott Dixon and Team Penske driver Ryan Briscoe. Dixon led the series heading into the final round, but Franchitti's win at the series finale at Homestead pushed the British driver eleven points clear at season's end.

Dixon, who took five wins, held second place by a solitary point over Briscoe. Briscoe, with three wins, had his best ever season leading Team Penske after Hélio Castroneves's abbreviated start to the season from his tax-evasion trial. The Brazilian recovered by winning his third Indianapolis 500 before taking a win at Texas Motor Speedway a month later.

The Ganassi and Penske teams dominated the season, only two race victories were taken by drivers other than the four regulars from these two teams, and one of them, at Edmonton, was claimed by part-time Penske driver Will Power. The only other winner was Justin Wilson, scoring Dale Coyne Racing's first victory at Watkins Glen.

The Andretti Green Racing team had their first ever season without a win. Drivers Danica Patrick, Tony Kanaan and Hideki Mutoh each scored podium finishes, and Patrick finished fifth in the season points, setting a new record for highest points finish by a female driver.

Brazilian racer Raphael Matos claimed rookie of the year honors for the Luczo-Dragon Racing team, finishing thirteenth in the season point score, 29 points clear of Robert Doornbos with a season best result of sixth at Milwaukee.

Originally Honda was supposed to end their IndyCar Series single engine supplier after 2009. But on September 23, 2009, it was confirmed that Honda renewed their single engine supplier until the 2011 season.

== Series news ==
- 2009 started a 10-year TV deal with the Versus TV network. Versus agreed to broadcast at least twelve IndyCar Series events a year in HD, as well as pre-race coverage, a one-hour preview show the day before each race including qualifying highlights, qualifications for the Indianapolis 500, a Firestone Indy Lights weekly telecast, replays of all series races a week after original broadcast, and at least ten hours of ancillary programming. Bob Jenkins, Robbie Buhl, and Jon Beekhuis made up the broadcast team along with Jack Arute, Robbie Floyd, and Lindy Thackston in the pits. Emmy Award-winning auto-racing producer Terry Lingner produced the coverage. Versus will air commercials using IndyCar Non-Stop. In 2011 Versus was renamed NBC Sports Network.
- Firestone supplied two sets of tire compounds beginning in 2009 on road and street courses for the IR5 chassis. Alternate tires would be marked with red sidewalls and would be made of a softer compound. They contain more grip and allow for faster times, but do not last as long as the regular tires. Each team received six sets of the regular tires ("the blacks") and three sets of the new alternate tires ("the reds") for the race weekend. The cars were required to run at least two green flag laps with the alternate tires during a race. Oval races used the primary tire only.
- A new private testing policy was put into place for team for 2009, provided they participate in the TEAM revenue-sharing program. Teams were permitted:
  - 800 miles (1,300 km) or six days of testing, whichever comes first, along with eight sets of tires.
  - Two-car teams may conduct 1,200 miles (1,900 km) of testing with 26 sets of tires.
  - Additional team cars gained 200 miles (320 km) and four sets of tires per car.
  - No testing at any track within seven days of a race.
  - Teams could earn additional test days by providing opportunities to Firestone Indy Lights drivers.
- Bonus practice time for rookies and teams outside the Top 10 in points were added starting at Long Beach. The bonus session lasted from 30 to 45 minutes at each venue before the first practice sessions of the day for all cars. The policy was intended to promote competition, allowing teams a chance to close the gap on the Top 10 teams without paying for expensive private testing, and provided more opportunities for rookie drivers, particularly those moving up from Indy Lights.
- Slight changes were made to the points system in 2009, the number of points awarded for leading the most laps in a race was reduced from three to two. A point was awarded for winning pole for a race.
- On December 26, 2008, IndyCar Series introduced a new exhaust design to reduce noise of Honda Indy V8 engines.
- IndyCar Series officials have banned formerly optional 118 and 120 inch wheelbases, requiring teams to uniformly adopt 122 inch wheelbases. This will provide cost savings for the teams as well as greatly enhancing competition on the oval tracks.
- On July 28, 2009, the IRL approved "push to pass" buttons on all the cars. This gave a driver a 20 hp boost for 12 seconds with a 10-second recharge time. This was available for use only 20 times during a given race. This feature debuted at the event at Kentucky Speedway on August 1, 2009.
- Due to several IndyCar Series teams opting for Dallara IR-05 chassis, Panoz discontinued their IndyCar Series involvement after the 2008 season.
- With the series undergoing a development freeze until the 2011 season, IndyCar Series teams carried over chassis and engine from 2008 season but modified due to new exhaust design. The series was concentrating on 2012 new car development to save costs.

== Confirmed entries ==
All entrants competed in Dallara IR-05 chassis, powered by Honda HI9R V8 engines, and utilize Firestone Firehawk tires.

Team	No	Drivers	Rounds
(United States) Andretti Green Racing	7	(United States) Danica Patrick	All
(United States) Andretti Green Racing	11	(Brazil) Tony Kanaan	All
(United States) Andretti Green Racing	25	(France) Franck Montagny R	14
(United States) Andretti Green Racing	26	(United States) Marco Andretti	All
(United States) Andretti Green Racing	27	(Japan) Hideki Mutoh	All
(United States) A. J. Foyt Enterprises	14	(Brazil) Vítor Meira	1–4
(United States) A. J. Foyt Enterprises	14	(Canada) Paul Tracy	5
(United States) A. J. Foyt Enterprises	14	(United States) Ryan Hunter-Reay	7–17
(United States) A. J. Foyt Enterprises	14	(United States) A. J. Foyt IV	6
(United States) A. J. Foyt Enterprises	41	(United States) A. J. Foyt IV	4
(United States) Conquest Racing	34	(Canada) Alex Tagliani	1–2, 4, 6, 10–11
(United States) Conquest Racing	34	(France) Nelson Philippe R	14
(United States) Conquest Racing	34	(Japan) Kosuke Matsuura	16
(United States) Conquest Racing	36	(Canada) Alex Tagliani	4
(United States) Conquest Racing	36	(Brazil) Bruno Junqueira	4
(United States) Dale Coyne Racing	18	(United Kingdom) Justin Wilson	2–17
(United States) Dale Coyne Racing	19	(United Kingdom) Justin Wilson	1
(United States) Dale Coyne Racing	19	(South Africa) Tomas Scheckter	4
(United States) Dreyer & Reinbold Racing	23	(United Kingdom) Darren Manning	1–2
(United States) Dreyer & Reinbold Racing	23	(Venezuela) Milka Duno	3–4, 6, 9, 12–15, 17
(United States) Dreyer & Reinbold Racing	23	(South Africa) Tomas Scheckter	5, 7–8, 10–11, 16
(United States) Dreyer & Reinbold Racing	24	(United Kingdom) Mike Conway R	All
(United States) Dreyer & Reinbold Racing	43	(United States) John Andretti	4
(United States) Dreyer & Reinbold Racing	43	(South Africa) Tomas Scheckter	6, 12, 15, 17
(United States) Dreyer & Reinbold Racing	43	(United States) Roger Yasukawa	16
(United States) Dreyer & Reinbold Racing	44	(United States) Davey Hamilton	4
(United States) Hemelgarn Racing	91	(United States) Buddy Lazier	4
(United States) HVM Racing	00	(France) Nelson Philippe R	4
(United States) HVM Racing	13	(Venezuela) E. J. Viso	All
(United States) HVM Racing	33	(Netherlands) Robert Doornbos R	13–17
(United States) KV Racing Technology	5	(Brazil) Mario Moraes	1–12, 14–17
(United States) KV Racing Technology	5	(Canada) Paul Tracy	13
(United States) KV Racing Technology	15	(Canada) Paul Tracy	4, 9–11
(United States) KV Racing Technology	8	(United States) Townsend Bell	4
(United States) Luczo-Dragon Racing	2	(Brazil) Raphael Matos R	All
(United States) Newman/Haas/Lanigan Racing	02	(United States) Graham Rahal	All
(United States) Newman/Haas/Lanigan Racing	06	(Netherlands) Robert Doornbos R	1–12
(United States) Newman/Haas/Lanigan Racing	06	(Spain) Oriol Servià	13–16
(United States) Newman/Haas/Lanigan Racing	40202	(United Kingdom) Alex Lloyd R	17
(United States) Panther Racing	4	(United Kingdom) Dan Wheldon	All
(United States) Panther Racing	16	(United States) Scott Sharp	4
(United States) Penske Racing	12	(Australia) Will Power	2, 4, 10–12, 14
(United States) Penske Racing	3	(Australia) Will Power	1
(United States) Penske Racing	3	(Brazil) Hélio Castroneves	2–17
(United States) Penske Racing	6	(Australia) Ryan Briscoe	All
(United States) Rahal Letterman Racing	17	(Spain) Oriol Servià	4
(United States) Sam Schmidt Motorsports	99	(United Kingdom) Alex Lloyd R	4
(United States) Sarah Fisher Racing	67	(United States) Sarah Fisher	3–4, 6, 12, 15, 17
(United States) Target Chip Ganassi Racing	9	(New Zealand) Scott Dixon	All
(United States) Target Chip Ganassi Racing	10	(United Kingdom) Dario Franchitti	All
(United States) Team 3G	98	(United States) Stanton Barrett R	1–5, 16
(United States) Team 3G	98	(United States) Jaques Lazier	6–8, 12, 15, 17
(United States) Team 3G	98	(United States) Richard Antinucci R	9–11, 13–14
(United States) Vision Racing	20	(United States) Ed Carpenter	All
(United States) Vision Racing	21	(United States) Ryan Hunter-Reay	1–6

=== Team and driver news ===
- Chip Ganassi Racing: 2007 Champion Dario Franchitti returns from NASCAR's Sprint Cup Series and is driving the #10 entry in 2009, replacing Dan Wheldon, who was re-signed by Panther Racing. 2007 Firestone Indy Lights Champion Alex Lloyd competed in the Indianapolis 500 with Sam Schmidt Motorsports in partnership with Ganassi.
- Penske Racing: Hélio Castroneves signed a multi-year contract extension with Penske Racing. However, on October 2, 2008, Castroneves was faced with a federal indictment, and was charged with six counts of tax evasion. Castroneves went on hiatus from the team during the trial. Will Power was named as a replacement, and drove the St. Petersburg race in the #3 car. With Castroneves being acquitted on all tax evasion charges later in the month, he returned to the #3 car starting at Long Beach, with the team running a third car, the #12 Penske Championship Racing machine for Will Power at Long Beach and the Indianapolis 500. Roger Penske announced after the Indianapolis 500 that he would field a third car for Power at additional races in the 2009 season.
- Andretti Green Racing: All four drivers returned for 2009. The team will field a fifth car for Franck Montagny at Sonoma.
- HVM Racing: Driver E. J. Viso returned for 2009. The team tested Ryan Hunter-Reay at Sebring but ultimately signed Viso. The team prepared a second Indy-only entry for Nelson Philippe.
- Panther Racing: Dan Wheldon signed a multi-year contract replacing Vítor Meira in the #4 entry. Scott Sharp drove a second Indy-only entry, in a joint-effort with Patrón Highcroft Racing.
- A. J. Foyt Enterprises: Vítor Meira replaced Darren Manning in the #14 entry. Meira suffered two fractured vertebrae at Indianapolis and missed most of the remainder of the season. Paul Tracy was the replacement driver for Milwaukee. The team fielded the #41 driven by A. J. Foyt IV in the Indianapolis 500. The #48 car was entered in the race but did not appear.
- KV Racing: Oriol Servia did not re-sign with the team and Will Power left for Penske Racing. Mario Moraes signed with the team for 2009 and will be the team's sole full-season entry. In addition to Servia, Paul Tracy and GP2 driver Lucas di Grassi also have been linked with a seat with the team. Team co-owner Jimmy Vasser has stated that he is confident the team will have a deal in place to run a second car starting with the Indy 500. It was announced on April 17 that Paul Tracy will drive the #15 car for the team at the Indy 500, with additional races up to the rest of the season possible. A later release from the team confirmed Tracy would appear in the #15 at the Edmonton and Toronto races. A third car, the #8, was listed for the team on the Indianapolis 500 entry list, and was raced by Townsend Bell.
- Vision Racing: A. J. Foyt IV was replaced by Ryan Hunter-Reay. The team would have prepared an additional car for the Indianapolis 500, the #22 entered by Bryan Herta Autosport, but entry was later withdrawn.
- Newman/Haas/Lanigan Racing: Justin Wilson did not return to the team in 2009. However, Graham Rahal's option was picked up for 2009 and he returned. 2007 Champ Car Rookie of the Year Robert Doornbos' signing was confirmed on February 20, 2009. Milka Duno tested with the team at Homestead, but the deal to run a third full-season car for her apparently fell apart as she lost her backing from Citgo according to a report.
- Conquest Racing: A marketing brochure on the team's official site states that "Conquest Racing will field two cars in the 2009 IndyCar Series. With Alex Tagliani, the team will have a wily veteran with the experience and commitment to continue moving the team forward. Joining Tagliani will be a driver of equal gift and grit to round out a balanced driver package.". On February 16, the team announced that Jaime Camara will return to the #34 car for the Homestead test, but that its 2009 driver lineup had not been finalized. On a conference call on February 18, owner Eric Bachelart said the team's ambition was to remain a two-car team, but they may have to have two drivers share one car for the season. On April 1, Tagliani was confirmed as the team's sole driver at St. Pete. The team has announced a partnership with the former Rubicon Race Team to attempt to add additional sponsorship. A second car is listed for the team on the Indy 500 entry list and it will be driven by Bruno Junqueira.
- Sarah Fisher Racing: Owner/driver Sarah Fisher secured funding for six oval races with sponsorship from Dollar General and IUPUI.
- Curb/Agajanian/Team 3G: Curb/Agajanian/Team 3G is a new team owned by Beck Motorsports owner Greg Beck, NASCAR driver Stanton Barrett, Mike Curb and Cary Agajanian of Curb Agajanian Motorsports and sports marketer Steve Sudler. Barrett will drive a full-time entry for the new team in 2009. The team is working on a deal to possibly run a second car in 2009, perhaps with Tomas Scheckter or another driver.
- Luczo-Dragon Racing: Luczo-Dragon has signed 2008 Firestone Indy Lights Champion Raphael Matos to a multi-year contract. Matos will race a full-time entry for the team in 2009.
- Roth Racing: Roth Racing has closed its doors and will not return as a full-season. The equipment was put up for sale. The team's employees were used to assist Conquest Racing for the second car that was prepared for Junqueira. The team entered two cars, the #25 and #52, on the Indy 500 entry list, but neither appeared.
- Rubicon Race Team/Pacific Coast Motorsports: Curt Cavin confirmed that Pacific Coast Motorsports and Rubicon had merged on January 23, and Rubicon's website updated listing PCM owner Tyler Tadevic and Panther Racing co-founder Doug Boles as new co-owners. Buddy Rice was reported as in-line for the seat with the combined team and the team claimed to be close to funding for a full schedule. The team did not participate in any open test or race and on the team's Twitter page they announced a name change to Rubicon Sports Agency. They formally announcing a partnership with Conquest Racing.
- Dale Coyne Racing: Mario Moraes left for KV Racing. Justin Wilson tested one of the Coyne cars at Homestead. Wilson was confirmed as the driver of Coyne's single entry at St. Petersburg and has signed a full-season deal. The team is still looking at possibilities to field a second car starting with the Indy 500. The team has a second entry, the #19 listed for the Indy 500. The team's primary entry was originally #19 but was changed by sponsor Z-Line Designs to #18 to match the NASCAR Nationwide Series Toyota Camry of Joe Gibbs Racing cars they sponsor starting at Long Beach.
- Dreyer & Reinbold Racing: The team announced Mike Conway signed for the 2009 campaign. The team plans to run a second car. Driver Roger Yasukawa will race with the team at Motegi. On April 1, 2009, it was confirmed that Darren Manning would drive the #23 Dreyer & Reinbold entry at St. Petersburg; Manning continued in the seat at Long Beach. Milka Duno will return to the team run a limited schedule in the #23 starting at Kansas. Davey Hamilton and Kingdom Racing will also partner with the team to field an Indy 500 entry. A fourth D&R entry at the Indianapolis 500 was announced on April 6, co-branded with George Gillett's Richard Petty Motorsports. That entry featured John Andretti with Window World as sponsor.
- Rahal Letterman Racing: The team was unable to secure sponsorship for the full 2009 season due to ApexBrasil's partnership with Ethanol as Ethanol fuel provider, but fielded an Indy-only effort for Oriol Servia. Instead, Rahal Letterman Racing to concentrate on the American Le Mans Series with BMW M3 E92 GT2 machines.
- De Ferran Motorsports: The ALMS team owned by Gil de Ferran was contemplating adding an IndyCar program. It did not materialize in enough time for the 2009 Indy 500, but is expected full-time for 2010. According to Speed Channel's Robin Miller, it may be a two car effort for former BAR Honda F1 driver Takuma Sato of Japan, and de Ferran's ALMS teammate Simon Pagenaud, who spent one year in Champ Car after winning the 2006 Atlantic Championship. One of de Ferran's former CART Championship rivals and fellow ALMS convert Adrian Fernandez had been rumoured to join the series for 2010, but the team closed its doors at the end of October 2009.
- Forsythe Racing: Former Champ Car team Forsythe Racing announced intentions to race in the IndyCar Series in 2009, and stated that they were close (95%) to finalizing programs according to team manager Ken Siweck in July 2008. Plans were also announced for a foray into the ALMS and a return to Indy Lights. No Forsythe car has appeared in any of the three series, but a blurb on usatoday.com on April 23, 2009, mentioned the team was "mulling an IndyCar entry".
- Hemelgarn Racing: The team entered the 2009 Indy 500 with Buddy Lazier, but failed to qualify.

== Schedule ==
Icon	Legend
O	Oval/Speedway
R	Road course
S	Street circuit
C	Cancelled race

Rnd	Date	Race Name	Track	Location
1	April 5	Honda Grand Prix of St. Petersburg	S Streets of St. Petersburg	(United States) St. Petersburg, Florida
2	April 19	Toyota Grand Prix of Long Beach	S Streets of Long Beach	(United States) Long Beach, California
3	April 26	RoadRunner Turbo Indy 300	O Kansas Speedway	(United States) Kansas City, Kansas
4	May 24	93rd Indianapolis 500	O Indianapolis Motor Speedway	(United States) Speedway, Indiana
5	May 31	ABC Supply Company A. J. Foyt 225	O The Milwaukee Mile	(United States) West Allis, Wisconsin
6	June 6	Bombardier Learjet 550	O Texas Motor Speedway	(United States) Fort Worth, Texas
7	June 21	Iowa Corn Indy 250	O Iowa Speedway	(United States) Newton, Iowa
8	June 27	SunTrust Indy Challenge	O Richmond International Raceway	(United States) Richmond, Virginia
9	July 5	Camping World Grand Prix at The Glen	R Watkins Glen International	(United States) Watkins Glen, New York
10	July 12	Honda Indy Toronto	S Exhibition Place	(Canada) Toronto, Ontario
11	July 26	Rexall Edmonton Indy	R Edmonton City Centre Airport Speedway	(Canada) Edmonton, Alberta
12	August 1	Meijer Indy 300	O Kentucky Speedway	(United States) Sparta, Kentucky
13	August 9	Honda 200	R Mid-Ohio Sports Car Course	(United States) Lexington, Ohio
14	August 23	Indy Grand Prix of Sonoma	R Infineon Raceway	(United States) Sonoma, California
15	August 29	Peak Antifreeze & Motor Oil Indy 300	O Chicagoland Speedway	(United States) Joliet, Illinois
C	September 6	Detroit Indy Grand Prix	S The Raceway on Belle Isle Park	(United States) Detroit, Michigan
16	September 18	Indy Japan 300	O Twin Ring Motegi	(Japan) Motegi, Tochigi
17	October 10	Firestone Indy 300	O Homestead-Miami Speedway	(United States) Homestead, Florida

=== Schedule details ===
- The Detroit Indy Grand Prix was cancelled for the 2009 season.

== Testing ==
The following open tests were held.

- February 24–25 at Homestead (night)
- March 22–23 at Barber Motorsports Park.

== Results ==
Rd.	Race	Pole position	Fastest lap	Most laps led	Race winner		Report
Rd.	Race	Pole position	Fastest lap	Most laps led	Driver	Team	Report
1	St. Petersburg	(United States) Graham Rahal	(United Kingdom) Justin Wilson	(United Kingdom) Justin Wilson	(Australia) Ryan Briscoe	(United States) Penske Racing	Report
2	Long Beach	(Australia) Will Power	(Australia) Ryan Briscoe	(United Kingdom) Dario Franchitti	(United Kingdom) Dario Franchitti	(United States) Chip Ganassi Racing	Report
3	Kansas	(United States) Graham Rahal	(Australia) Ryan Briscoe	(New Zealand) Scott Dixon	(New Zealand) Scott Dixon	(United States) Chip Ganassi Racing	Report
4	Indianapolis	(Brazil) Hélio Castroneves	(United Kingdom) Dario Franchitti	(New Zealand) Scott Dixon	(Brazil) Hélio Castroneves	(United States) Penske Racing	Report
5	Milwaukee	(Australia) Ryan Briscoe	(New Zealand) Scott Dixon	(Australia) Ryan Briscoe	(New Zealand) Scott Dixon	(United States) Chip Ganassi Racing	Report
6	Texas	(United Kingdom) Dario Franchitti	(Australia) Ryan Briscoe	(Australia) Ryan Briscoe	(Brazil) Hélio Castroneves	(United States) Penske Racing	Report
7	Iowa	(Brazil) Hélio Castroneves	(Japan) Hideki Mutoh	(Australia) Ryan Briscoe	(United Kingdom) Dario Franchitti	(United States) Chip Ganassi Racing	Report
8	Richmond	(United Kingdom) Dario Franchitti	(New Zealand) Scott Dixon	(New Zealand) Scott Dixon	(New Zealand) Scott Dixon	(United States) Chip Ganassi Racing	Report
9	Watkins Glen	(Australia) Ryan Briscoe	(Australia) Ryan Briscoe	(United Kingdom) Justin Wilson	(United Kingdom) Justin Wilson	(United States) Dale Coyne Racing	Report
10	Toronto	(United Kingdom) Dario Franchitti	(Australia) Ryan Briscoe	(United Kingdom) Dario Franchitti	(United Kingdom) Dario Franchitti	(United States) Chip Ganassi Racing	Report
11	Edmonton	(Australia) Will Power	(United Kingdom) Mike Conway	(Australia) Will Power	(Australia) Will Power	(United States) Penske Racing	Report
12	Kentucky	(New Zealand) Scott Dixon	(United States) Ed Carpenter	(New Zealand) Scott Dixon	(Australia) Ryan Briscoe	(United States) Penske Racing	Report
13	Mid-Ohio	(Australia) Ryan Briscoe	(New Zealand) Scott Dixon	(New Zealand) Scott Dixon	(New Zealand) Scott Dixon	(United States) Chip Ganassi Racing	Report
14	Sonoma	(United Kingdom) Dario Franchitti	(Brazil) Hélio Castroneves	(United Kingdom) Dario Franchitti	(United Kingdom) Dario Franchitti	(United States) Chip Ganassi Racing	Report
15	Chicagoland	(Australia) Ryan Briscoe	(South Africa) Tomas Scheckter	(Australia) Ryan Briscoe	(Australia) Ryan Briscoe	(United States) Penske Racing	Report
16	Motegi	(New Zealand) Scott Dixon	(New Zealand) Scott Dixon	(New Zealand) Scott Dixon	(New Zealand) Scott Dixon	(United States) Chip Ganassi Racing	Report
17	Homestead	(United Kingdom) Dario Franchitti	(New Zealand) Scott Dixon	(Australia) Ryan Briscoe	(United Kingdom) Dario Franchitti	(United States) Chip Ganassi Racing	Report

== Race summaries ==
=== Round 1: Honda Grand Prix of St. Petersburg ===
- Report: 2009 Honda Grand Prix of St. Petersburg
- Sunday April 5, 2009 – 2:00 p.m. EDT
- Streets of St. Petersburg – St. Petersburg, Florida (1.8-mile temporary street course)
- Distance: 100 laps / 180 miles
- Race weather: 86 °F (30 °C), sunny
- Television: Versus (Bob Jenkins, Robbie Buhl, Jon Beekhuis, Jack Arute, Robbie Floyd, Lindy Thackston)
- Nielsen ratings: 0.30
- Attendance: 140,000+ (estimated 3-day weekend attendance)
- Pole position winner: #02 Graham Rahal, 1:02.4110 sec, 103.828 mph (167.095 km/h)
- Race Summary: On the opening lap, polesitter Graham Rahal was involved in light contact with Tony Kanaan, which damaged his nosecone, and dropped him deep in the standings. With 20 laps to go, defending IndyCar champion Scott Dixon crashed out after contact with Hideki Mutoh. With 14 laps to go, Ryan Briscoe took the lead from Justin Wilson on a restart. Briscoe held off Ryan Hunter-Reay to secure the victory.

Top Five Finishers
Fin. Pos	St. Pos	Car No.	Driver	Team	Laps	Time	Laps Led
1	4	6	(Australia) Ryan Briscoe	Penske Racing	100	2:12:26.8387	46
2	14	21	(United States) Ryan Hunter-Reay	Vision Racing	100	+0.4619	0
3	2	19	(United Kingdom) Justin Wilson	Dale Coyne Racing	100	+0.9490	52
4	5	10	(United Kingdom) Dario Franchitti	Chip Ganassi Racing	100	+1.5230	0
5	3	11	(Brazil) Tony Kanaan	Andretti Green Racing	100	+2.3214	0
Race average speed: 81.542 mph (131.229 km/h)
Lead changes: 5 between 3 drivers
Cautions: 7 for 28 laps

=== Round 2: 35th Toyota Grand Prix of Long Beach ===
- Report: 2009 Toyota Grand Prix of Long Beach
- Sunday April 19, 2009 – 12:30 p.m. PDT / 3:30 p.m. EDT
- Streets of Long Beach – Long Beach, California (1.968-mile temporary street course)
- Distance: 85 laps / 167.28 miles
- Race weather: 96 °F (36 °C), sunny
- Television: Versus (Bob Jenkins, Robbie Buhl, Jon Beekhuis, Jack Arute, Robbie Floyd, Lindy Thackston)
- Nielsen ratings: 0.52
- Attendance: 65,000+ (estimated race day), 175,000 (estimated 3-day weekend)
- Pole Position winner: #12 Will Power, 1:09.7107 sec, 101.631 mph (163.559 km/h)
- Race Summary: At the start, Will Power took the lead from the pole position and led the first 16 laps. Dario Franchitti and Danica Patrick both pitted early on lap 16, and benefitted from a full-course caution. Over the next 30 laps, the lead traded between Tony Kanaan, Marco Andretti, and Dario Franchitti. Pitting early once more, Dario Franchitti and Danica Patrick again benefitted. Moments later, Mike Conway spun into the tire barrier in turn 8, bringing out the full course caution again. Most of the leaders pit under the yellow, while Franchitti stayed out to take the lead. Franchitti pulled away and held the lead to the finish, taking the victory. It was his first IndyCar win since 2007, having spent 2008 racing in NASCAR.

Top Five Finishers
Fin. Pos	St. Pos	Car No.	Driver	Team	Laps	Time	Laps Led
1	2	10	(United Kingdom) Dario Franchitti	Chip Ganassi Racing	85	1:58:47.4658	51
2	1	12	(Australia) Will Power	Penske Racing	85	+3.3182	16
3	11	11	(Brazil) Tony Kanaan	Andretti Green Racing	85	+4.0537	7
4	22	7	(United States) Danica Patrick	Andretti Green Racing	85	+5.0742	0
5	14	4	(United Kingdom) Dan Wheldon	Panther Racing	85	+6.5655	0
Race average speed: 84.491 mph (135.975 km/h)
Lead changes: 6 between 6 drivers
Cautions: 5 for 18 laps

=== Round 3: RoadRunner Turbo Indy 300 ===
- Report: 2009 RoadRunner Turbo Indy 300
- Sunday April 26, 2009 – 3:00 p.m. CDT / 4:00 p.m. EDT
- Kansas Speedway – Kansas City, Kansas (1.52 mile oval)
- Distance: 200 laps / 304 miles
- Race weather: 78 °F (26 °C), cloudy
- Television: Versus (Bob Jenkins, Robbie Buhl, Jon Beekhuis, Jack Arute, Robbie Floyd, Lindy Thackston)
- Nielsen ratings: 0.15
- Attendance:
- Pole Position winner: #02 Graham Rahal, 1:43.5819 sec, 211.311 mph (340.072 km/h) (4-lap)
- Race Summary:

Top Five Finishers
Fin. Pos	St. Pos	Car No.	Driver	Team	Laps	Time	Laps Led
1	4	9	(New Zealand) Scott Dixon	Chip Ganassi Racing	200	1:43:21.0035	134
2	22	3	(Brazil) Hélio Castroneves	Penske Racing	200	+0.7104	3
3	8	11	(Brazil) Tony Kanaan	Andretti Green Racing	200	+1.5022	0
4	7	6	(Australia) Ryan Briscoe	Penske Racing	200	+1.8872	53
5	3	7	(United States) Danica Patrick	Andretti Green Racing	200	+2.6502	0
Race average speed: 176.488 mph (284.030 km/h)
Lead changes: 10 between 5 drivers
Cautions: 3 for 20 laps

=== Round 4: 93rd Indianapolis 500 ===
- Report: 2009 Indianapolis 500
- Sunday May 24, 2009 – 12:12 p.m. CDT / 1:12 p.m. EDT
- Indianapolis Motor Speedway – Speedway, Indiana (2.5 mile oval)
- Distance: 200 laps / 500 miles
- Race weather: 83 °F (28 °C), sunny
- Television: ABC (Marty Reid, Scott Goodyear, Eddie Cheever, Jack Arute, Jamie Little, Brienne Pedigo, Vince Welch)
- Nielsen ratings: 4.2
- Attendance: TBA
- Pole Position winner: #3 Hélio Castroneves, 2:40.0967 sec, 224.864 mph (361.884 km/h) (4-lap)
- Race Summary: Dario Franchitti made the move at the start, passing Ryan Briscoe on the first lap and polesitter Hélio Castroneves at a restart on the eighth lap. Scott Dixon and Tony Kanaan, starting fifth and sixth made short work of Graham Rahal and joined the top three. Castroneves lost out to Briscoe and Dixon in the first round of stops. Briscoe, now second took the lead from Franchitti on lap 53. Graham Rahal crashed from sixth on lap 56 which brought out the caution. Another poor stop for Castroneves got him behind Kanaan as well, while the two Ganassi cars of Dixon and Franchitti switched places. The race turned green on lap 64, and it was evident that Briscoe had a bad set of tires. He lost many places immediately, and Castroneves also lost out to Raphael Matos and Danica Patrick. Meanwhile, Briscoe had to pit again, and rejoined 24th. The top three pulled away, while Castroneves passed Patrick on lap 81. During the third round of stops (after another caution), Franchitti got ahead of Dixon, and Castroneves got in front of Matos. There was the green flag on lap 91, and Dixon used Franchitti's slipstream to take the lead. Kanaan, running third on lap 98 had a huge impact with the wall at Turn 3 after a mechanical failure. He was okay except for some bruises, and the caution was brought out again leading to the fourth round of stops. The top two retained order, while third placed Castroneves again lost out, this time to Will Power and Matos. Danica Patrick had a bad stop as well, dropping from sixth to tenth. During the next restart, Castroneves made short work of Matos, and had a go at Power, but Power kept the place. The order remained the same until lap 131, when Nelson Philippe crashed, bringing out the fifth caution. This led to another round of stops. While Dixon maintained his lead, Franchitti had a slow stop, dropping from second to eighth, and Castrineves got the jump on power. The order after the stops is Dixon from Castroneves, Power, Paul Tracy and Dan Wheldon. The green flag came out on lap 142, and it was Castroneves who immediately was on sond, taking the lead from Dixon even before they had reached the first turn. Tracy started dropping back, quickly passed by Wheldon and Townsend Bell. Franchitti, frustrated after his bad stop, further dropped down to 12th after running wide when trying to pass Ed Carpenter. On lap 159, Power passed Dixon for second. The next caution came after Justin Wilson crashed. This led to one more round of stops. Power and Dixon, running second and third had bad stops, and Danica Patrick got in front of Townsend Bell during this time. Ryan Briscoe did not stop, and was in second. There were no changes at the restart. There was one more caution, during which Briscoe pitted from second. He rejoined 16th. At the last restart with twenty laps to go, Patrick had a go at Wheldon but Wheldon defended well. Castroneves pulled away and won, with Wheldon, Patrick, Bell and Power making the top 5.

Top Five Finishers
Fin. Pos	St. Pos	Car No.	Driver	Team	Laps	Time	Laps Led
1	1	3	(Brazil) Hélio Castroneves	Penske Racing	200	3:19:34.6427	66
2	18	4	(United Kingdom) Dan Wheldon	Panther Racing	200	+1.9819	0
3	10	7	(United States) Danica Patrick	Andretti Green Racing	200	+2.3350	0
4	24	8	(United States) Townsend Bell	KV Racing Technology	200	+2.7043	0
5	9	12	(Australia) Will Power	Penske Racing	200	+3.6216	0
Race average speed: 150.318 mph (241.913 km/h)
Lead changes: 6 between 4 drivers
Cautions: 8 for 61 laps

=== Round 5: ABC Supply Company A. J. Foyt 225 ===
- Report: 2009 ABC Supply Company A.J. Foyt 225
- Sunday May 31, 2009 – 2:50 p.m. CDT / 3:50 p.m. EDT
- Milwaukee Mile – West Allis, Wisconsin (1.015 mile oval)
- Distance: 225 laps / 228.375 miles
- Race weather: 57 °F (14 °C), partially cloudy
- Television: ABC (Marty Reid, Scott Goodyear, Jack Arute, Brienne Pedigo, Vince Welch)
- Nielsen ratings: 0.72
- Attendance:
- Pole Position winner: #6 Ryan Briscoe, 1:26.7966 sec, 168.394 mph (271.004 km/h) (4-lap)
- Race Summary: Polesitter Ryan Briscoe overcame a bad start to pass Tony Kanaan and Graham Rahal to lead. He led until lap 200, when Scott Dixon took advantage of backmarker Tomas Scheckter to pass him on the inside of Turn 2. Dixon went on to win ahead of Briscoe and Dario Franchitti.

Top Five Finishers
Fin. Pos	St. Pos	Car No.	Driver	Team	Laps	Time	Laps Led
1	4	9	(New Zealand) Scott Dixon	Chip Ganassi Racing	225	1:38:43.9552	27
2	1	6	(Australia) Ryan Briscoe	Penske Racing	225	+2.1257	154
3	8	10	(United Kingdom) Dario Franchitti	Chip Ganassi Racing	225	+2.2644	19
4	2	02	(United States) Graham Rahal	Newman/Haas/Lanigan Racing	225	+2.6744	0
5	7	7	(United States) Danica Patrick	Andretti Green Racing	225	+5.9824	0
Race average speed: 138.784 mph (223.351 km/h)
Lead changes: 5 between 4 drivers
Cautions: 2 for 22 laps

=== Round 6: Bombardier Learjet 550 ===
- Report: 2009 Bombardier Learjet 550
- Saturday June 6, 2009 – 8:40 p.m. CDT / 9:40 p.m. EDT
- Texas Motor Speedway – Fort Worth, Texas (1.455 mile oval)
- Distance: 228 laps / 331.74 miles
- Race weather: 89 °F (32 °C), fair
- Television: Versus (Bob Jenkins, Robbie Buhl, Jon Beekhuis, Jack Arute, Robbie Floyd, Lindy Thackston)
- Nielsen ratings: 0.63
- Attendance: 90,000 (estimated)
- Pole Position winner: #10 Dario Franchitti, 1:37.6725 sec, 214.513 mph (345.225 km/h) (4-lap)
- Race Summary: Ryan Briscoe passed polesitter Dario Franchitti at a restart on lap 10, and as there were no cautions for the next 140 laps, Briscoe built up a 15-second lead over second placed Marco Andretti. A caution for debris on lap 151 took away the lead. Three laps after the restart, Hélio Castroneves passed Andretti for second. A crash for A. J. Foyt IV brought out the yellow flag again, and led to the final round of stops. A quicker stop for Castroneves got him ahead of Briscoe. Castroneves held off Briscoe for the win, with Scott Dixon, Andretti and Franchitti making up the top 5.

Top Five Finishers
Fin. Pos	St. Pos	Car No.	Driver	Team	Laps	Time	Laps Led
1	4	3	(Brazil) Hélio Castroneves	Penske Racing	228	1:55:16.1670	57
2	2	6	(Australia) Ryan Briscoe	Penske Racing	228	+0.3904	160
3	3	9	(New Zealand) Scott Dixon	Chip Ganassi Racing	228	+2.2461	0
4	8	26	(United States) Marco Andretti	Andretti Green Racing	228	+4.3745	0
5	1	10	(United Kingdom) Dario Franchitti	Chip Ganassi Racing	228	+4.7695	10
Race average speed: 172.677 mph (277.897 km/h)
Lead changes: 7 between 4 drivers
Cautions: 3 for 26 laps

=== Round 7: Iowa Corn Indy 250 ===
- Report: 2009 Iowa Corn Indy 250
- Sunday June 21, 2009 – 12:28 p.m. CDT / 1:28 p.m. EDT
- Iowa Speedway – Newton, Iowa (0.894 mile oval)
- Distance: 250 laps / 223.5 miles
- Race weather: 75 °F (24 °C), overcast
- Television: ABC (Marty Reid, Scott Goodyear, Jack Arute, Brienne Pedigo, Vince Welch)
- Nielsen ratings: 0.8
- Attendance: 42,000
- Pole Position winner: #3 Hélio Castroneves (qualifying cancelled; field set by owner points)
- Race Summary:

Top Five Finishers
Fin. Pos	St. Pos	Car No.	Driver	Team	Laps	Time	Laps Led
1	4	10	(United Kingdom) Dario Franchitti	Chip Ganassi Racing	250	1:39:47.9077	68
2	2	6	(Australia) Ryan Briscoe	Penske Racing	250	+5.0132	85
3	11	27	(Japan) Hideki Mutoh	Andretti Green Racing	250	+10.9769	0
4	6	4	(United Kingdom) Dan Wheldon	Panther Racing	250	+17.5807	8
5	3	9	(New Zealand) Scott Dixon	Chip Ganassi Racing	249	+1 Lap	1
Race average speed: 134.371 mph (216.249 km/h)
Lead changes: 12 between 7 drivers
Cautions: 5 for 46 laps

=== Round 8: SunTrust Indy Challenge ===
- Report: 2009 SunTrust Indy Challenge
- Saturday June 27, 2009 – 7:45 p.m. CDT / 8:45 p.m. EDT
- Richmond International Raceway – Henrico County, Virginia (0.75 mile oval)
- Distance: 300 laps / 225 miles
- Race weather: 76 °F (24 °C), partly cloudy
- Television: Versus (Bob Jenkins, Robbie Buhl, Jon Beekhuis, Jack Arute, Robbie Floyd, Lindy Thackston)
- Nielsen ratings: 0.22
- Attendance:
- Pole Position winner: #10 Dario Franchitti, 1:04.5488 sec, 167.315 mph (269.267 km/h) (4-lap)
- Race Summary:

Top Five Finishers
Fin. Pos	St. Pos	Car No.	Driver	Team	Laps	Time	Laps Led
1	2	9	(New Zealand) Scott Dixon	Chip Ganassi Racing	300	1:48:02.4703	161
2	1	10	(United Kingdom) Dario Franchitti	Chip Ganassi Racing	300	+0.3109	65
3	5	02	(United States) Graham Rahal	Newman/Haas/Lanigan Racing	300	+2.4085	0
4	8	27	(Japan) Hideki Mutoh	Andretti Green Racing	300	+13.5302	74
5	10	7	(United States) Danica Patrick	Andretti Green Racing	300	+14.1111	0
Race average speed: 124.952 mph (201.091 km/h)
Lead changes: 3 between 3 drivers
Cautions: 4 for 46 laps

=== Round 9: Camping World Grand Prix at The Glen ===
- Report: 2009 Camping World Grand Prix at the Glen
- Sunday July 5, 2009 – 1:26 p.m. EDT
- Watkins Glen International – Watkins Glen, New York (3.37 mile road course)
- Distance: 60 laps / 202.2 miles
- Race weather: 71 °F (22 °C), fair
- Television: ABC (Marty Reid, Scott Goodyear, Jack Arute, Brienne Pedigo, Vince Welch)
- Nielsen ratings: 0.9
- Attendance:
- Pole Position winner: #6 Ryan Briscoe, 1:28.5970 sec, 136.935 mph (220.376 km/h)
- Race Summary: Justin Wilson dominated most of the event, en route to victory, the first-ever Indy car win for Dale Coyne Racing. Late in the race, Wilson was carrying the optional red tires. A late-race caution bunched the field for a sprint to the finish. Wilson got the jump on the restart, and pulled out to over a 4-second lead to preserve the win. It was the first race all season, and the first since the 2008 Detroit event, which saw neither Ganassi nor Penske in victory lane.

Top Five Finishers
Fin. Pos	St. Pos	Car No.	Driver	Team	Laps	Time	Laps Led
1	2	18	(United Kingdom) Justin Wilson	Dale Coyne Racing	60	1:48:24.1947	49
2	1	6	(Australia) Ryan Briscoe	Penske Racing	60	+4.9906	7
3	3	9	(New Zealand) Scott Dixon	Chip Ganassi Racing	60	+5.1632	1
4	13	3	(Brazil) Hélio Castroneves	Penske Racing	60	+7.0755	1
5	8	26	(United States) Marco Andretti	Andretti Green Racing	60	+8.5595	2
Race average speed: 111.915 mph (180.110 km/h)
Lead changes: 8 between 5 drivers
Cautions: 4 for 10 laps

=== Round 10: Honda Indy Toronto ===
- Report: 2009 Honda Indy Toronto
- Sunday July 12, 2009 – 1:16 p.m. EDT
- Streets of Toronto – Toronto, Ontario (1.755 mile temporary street course)
- Distance: 85 laps / 149.175 miles
- Race weather: 72 °F (22 °C), partly cloudy
- Television: ABC (Marty Reid, Scott Goodyear, Jack Arute, Brienne Pedigo, Vince Welch)
- Nielsen ratings: 1.0
- Attendance:
- Pole Position winner: #10 Dario Franchitti, 1:01.0249 sec, 103.532 mph (166.619 km/h)
- Race Summary:

Top Five Finishers
Fin. Pos	St. Pos	Car No.	Driver	Team	Laps	Time	Laps Led
1	1	10	(United Kingdom) Dario Franchitti	Chip Ganassi Racing	85	1:43:47.1408	45
2	11	6	(Australia) Ryan Briscoe	Penske Racing	85	+1.6745	0
3	2	12	(Australia) Will Power	Penske Racing	85	+2.1355	0
4	8	9	(New Zealand) Scott Dixon	Chip Ganassi Racing	85	+2.4803	0
5	4	18	(United Kingdom) Justin Wilson	Dale Coyne Racing	85	+2.9230	0
Race average speed: 86.240 mph (138.790 km/h)
Lead changes: 7 between 5 drivers
Cautions: 5 for 15 laps

=== Round 11: Rexall Edmonton Indy ===
- Report: 2009 Rexall Edmonton Indy
- Sunday July 26, 2009 – 3:50 p.m. MDT / 5:50 p.m. EDT
- Rexall Speedway – Edmonton, Alberta (1.973 mile temporary airport course)
- Distance: 95 laps / 187.435 miles
- Race weather: 77 °F (25 °C), partly cloudy
- Television: Versus (Bob Jenkins, Robbie Buhl, Jon Beekhuis, Kevin Lee, Robbie Floyd, Lindy Thackston)
- Nielsen ratings: 0.24
- Attendance:
- Pole Position winner: #12 Will Power, 1:01.0133 sec, 116.414 mph (187.350 km/h)
- Race Summary: Penske Racing cars started 1–2–3 for the first time since Mid-Ohio in 1994.

Top Five Finishers
Fin. Pos	St. Pos	Car No.	Driver	Team	Laps	Time	Laps Led
1	1	12	(Australia) Will Power	Penske Racing	95	1:42:42.3773	90
2	3	3	(Brazil) Hélio Castroneves	Penske Racing	95	+1.0936*	2
3	4	9	(New Zealand) Scott Dixon	Chip Ganassi Racing	95	+1.3213	2
4	2	6	(Australia) Ryan Briscoe	Penske Racing	95	+1.8266	1
5	6	10	(United Kingdom) Dario Franchitti	Chip Ganassi Racing	95	+4.4652	0
Race average speed: 109.498 mph (176.220 km/h)
Lead changes: 5 between 4 drivers
Cautions: 1 for 2 laps

- * Race finished under caution.

=== Round 12: Meijer Indy 300 ===
- Report: 2009 Meijer Indy 300
- Saturday August 1, 2009 – 8:30 p.m. EDT
- Kentucky Speedway – Sparta, Kentucky (1.48 mile oval)
- Distance: 200 laps / 296 miles
- Race weather: 76 °F (24 °C), overcast
- Television: Versus (Bob Jenkins, Robbie Buhl, Jon Beekhuis, Kevin Lee, Robbie Floyd, Lindy Thackston)
- Nielsen ratings: 0.14
- Attendance: 48,000
- Pole Position winner: #9 Scott Dixon (qualifying cancelled; field set by owner points)
- Race Summary: Series officials implemented a mid-season rules change on oval races to encourage increased competition. A push-to-pass system was added to the cars, along with various aerodynamic enhancements. The changes were well-received, and the race became the most competitive oval race on the circuit in almost two years. In the final 50 laps, Ed Carpenter of Vision Racing led Ryan Briscoe and Tony Kanaan, with Hélio Castroneves lurking amongst the top 5. In the final ten laps, Carpenter and Briscoe raced side by side, swapping the lead several times each lap. On the final turn, Briscoe edged ahead, and denied Carpenter his first career victory by 0.0162 seconds. The race's average speed, only slowed by a single caution flag for a second straight race, was over 200 mph (320 km/h), making it the second fastest IndyCar Series race held.

Top Five Finishers
Fin. Pos	St. Pos	Car No.	Driver	Team	Laps	Time	Laps Led
1	3	6	(Australia) Ryan Briscoe	Penske Racing	200	1:28:24.3246	38
2	14	20	(United States) Ed Carpenter	Vision Racing	200	+0.0162	35
3	9	11	(Brazil) Tony Kanaan	Andretti Green Racing	200	+0.1614	1
4	4	3	(Brazil) Hélio Castroneves	Penske Racing	200	+0.2728	1
5	10	02	(United States) Graham Rahal	Newman/Haas/Lanigan Racing	200	+0.6346	0
Race average speed: 200.893 mph (323.306 km/h)
Lead changes: 22 between 7 drivers
Cautions: 1 for 6 laps

=== Round 13: Honda 200 ===
- Report: 2009 Honda 200
- Sunday August 9, 2009 – 1:56 p.m. EDT
- Mid-Ohio Sports Car Course – Lexington, Ohio (2.258 mile road course)
- Distance: 85 laps / 191.930 miles
- Race weather: 91 °F (33 °C), partly cloudy
- Television: Versus (Bob Jenkins, Robbie Buhl, Jon Beekhuis, Jack Arute, Robbie Floyd, Lindy Thackston)
- Nielsen ratings: 0.2
- Attendance:
- Pole Position winner: #6 Ryan Briscoe, 1:06.6814 sec, 121.905 mph (196.187 km/h)
- Race Summary:

Top Five Finishers
Fin. Pos	St. Pos	Car No.	Driver	Team	Laps	Time	Laps Led
1	3	9	(New Zealand) Scott Dixon	Chip Ganassi Racing	85	1:46:05.7985	51
2	1	6	(Australia) Ryan Briscoe	Penske Racing	85	+29.7803	6
3	6	10	(United Kingdom) Dario Franchitti	Chip Ganassi Racing	85	+30.0551	0
4	7	14	(United States) Ryan Hunter-Reay	A. J. Foyt Enterprises	85	+33.7307	0
5	11	27	(Japan) Hideki Mutoh	Andretti Green Racing	85	+34.1839	0
Race average speed: 108.541 mph (174.680 km/h)
Lead changes: 5 between 3 drivers
Cautions: 2 for 6 laps

=== Round 14: Indy Grand Prix of Sonoma ===
- Report: 2009 Indy Grand Prix of Sonoma
- Sunday August 23, 2009 – 2:50 p.m. PDT / 5:50 p.m. EDT
- Infineon Raceway – Sonoma, California (2.303 mile road course)
- Distance: 75 laps / 172.725 miles
- Race weather: 69 °F (21 °C), fair
- Television: Versus (Bob Jenkins, Robbie Buhl, Jon Beekhuis, Jack Arute, Robbie Floyd, Lindy Thackston)
- Nielsen ratings: 0.25
- Attendance:
- Pole Position winner: #10 Dario Franchitti, 1:16.7987 sec, 107.955 mph (173.737 km/h)
- Race Summary:

Top Five Finishers
Fin. Pos	St. Pos	Car No.	Driver	Team	Laps	Time	Laps Led
1	1	10	(United Kingdom) Dario Franchitti	Chip Ganassi Racing	75	1:49:23.0073	75
2	2	6	(Australia) Ryan Briscoe	Penske Racing	75	+0.2488	0
3	9	24	(United Kingdom) Mike Conway R	Dreyer & Reinbold Racing	75	+0.8293	0
4	14	5	(Brazil) Mario Moraes	KV Racing Technology	75	+3.6171	0
5	5	27	(Japan) Hideki Mutoh	Andretti Green Racing	75	+5.4536	0
Race average speed: 94.745 mph (152.477 km/h)
Lead changes: None
Cautions: 2 for 7 laps

=== Round 15: Peak Antifreeze & Motor Oil Indy 300 ===
- Report: 2009 Peak Antifreeze & Motor Oil Indy 300
- Saturday August 29, 2009 – 9:00 p.m. CDT / 10:00 p.m. EDT
- Chicagoland Speedway – Joliet, Illinois (1.52 mile oval)
- Distance: 200 laps / 304 miles
- Race weather: 60 °F (16 °C), fair
- Television: Versus (Bob Jenkins, Robbie Buhl, Jon Beekhuis, Jack Arute, Robbie Floyd, Lindy Thackston)
- Nielsen ratings: 0.24
- Attendance:
- Pole Position winner: #6 Ryan Briscoe, 1:41.6327 sec, 215.364 mph (346.595 km/h) (4-lap)
- Race Summary:

Top Five Finishers
Fin. Pos	St. Pos	Car No.	Driver	Team	Laps	Time	Laps Led
1	1	6	(Australia) Ryan Briscoe	Penske Racing	200	1:42:34.3051	71
2	6	9	(New Zealand) Scott Dixon	Chip Ganassi Racing	200	+0.0077	61
3	8	5	(Brazil) Mario Moraes	KV Racing Technology	200	+0.0699	0
4	3	10	(United Kingdom) Dario Franchitti	Chip Ganassi Racing	200	+0.0997	34
5	5	02	(United States) Graham Rahal	Newman/Haas/Lanigan Racing	200	+0.1295	0
Race average speed: 177.827 mph (286.185 km/h)
Lead changes: 18 between 6 drivers
Cautions: 3 for 23 laps

=== Round 16: Indy Japan 300 ===
- Report: 2009 Indy Japan 300
- Saturday September 19, 2009 – 12:00 p.m. JST / Friday September 18, 2009 – 11:00 p.m. EDT
- Twin Ring Motegi – Motegi, Tochigi (1.52 mile oval)
- Distance: 200 laps / 304 miles
- Race weather: 76 °F (24 °C), cloudy
- Television: Versus (Bob Jenkins, Robbie Buhl, Jon Beekhuis, Jack Arute)
- Nielsen ratings: 0.14, 197,000 viewers
- Attendance:
- Pole Position winner: #9 Scott Dixon, 1:48.3400 sec, 202.031 mph (325.137 km/h) (4-lap)
- Race Summary: Ryan Briscoe's solo incident with the pit road wall allowed the championship to continue to Homestead-Miami Speedway.

Top Five Finishers
Fin. Pos	St. Pos	Car No.	Driver	Team	Laps	Time	Laps Led
1	1	9	(New Zealand) Scott Dixon	Chip Ganassi Racing	200	1:51:37.6411	139
2	3	10	(United Kingdom) Dario Franchitti	Chip Ganassi Racing	200	+1.4475	53
3	5	02	(United States) Graham Rahal	Newman/Haas/Lanigan Racing	200	+3.2002	3
4	7	06	(Spain) Oriol Servià	Newman/Haas/Lanigan Racing	200	+7.3720	0
5	2	5	(Brazil) Mario Moraes	KV Racing Technology	200	+12.7643	0
Race average speed: 163.401 mph (262.968 km/h)
Lead changes: 7 between 4 drivers
Cautions: 2 for 23 laps

=== Round 17: Firestone Indy 300 ===
- Report: 2009 Firestone Indy 300
- Saturday October 10, 2009 – 5:00 p.m. EDT
- Homestead-Miami Speedway – Homestead, Florida (1.485 mile oval)
- Distance: 200 laps / 297 miles
- Race weather: 89 °F (32 °C), fair
- Television: Versus (Bob Jenkins, Robbie Buhl, Jon Beekhuis, Jack Arute, Robbie Floyd, Lindy Thackston)
- Nielsen ratings: 0.24
- Attendance:
- Pole Position winner: #10 Dario Franchitti, 1:40.5378 sec, 212.696 mph (342.301 km/h) (4-lap)
- Race Summary: The championship battle came down to a three-man race between Scott Dixon, Dario Franchitti (5 points behind), and Ryan Briscoe (8 points behind). In what became the series' first oval race to run caution-free the full distance, the three title contenders dominated and were the only cars to finish on the lead lap. In the final 50 laps, fuel strategy became key, as Dixon and Briscoe ran 1st–2nd, with Franchitti trailing some 25 seconds in third. Both Dixon and Briscoe were forced to pit for fuel in the final 8 laps, while Franchitti stayed out and stretched his fuel to the finish. Franchitti's race victory clinched his second IndyCar Series title.

Top Five Finishers
Fin. Pos	St. Pos	Car No.	Driver	Team	Laps	Time	Laps Led
1	1	10	(United Kingdom) Dario Franchitti	Chip Ganassi Racing	200	1:28:28.3117	25
2	3	6	(Australia) Ryan Briscoe	Penske Racing	200	+4.7888	103
3	2	9	(New Zealand) Scott Dixon	Chip Ganassi Racing	200	+6.0206	70
4	15	11	(Brazil) Tony Kanaan	Andretti Green Racing	199	+1 Lap	0
5	11	3	(Brazil) Hélio Castroneves	Penske Racing	199	+1 Lap	2
Race average speed: 201.420 mph (324.154 km/h)
Lead changes: 12 between 4 drivers
Cautions: None

== Points standings ==
- Ties in points broken by number of wins, followed by number of 2nds, 3rds, etc., and then by number of pole positions, followed by number of times qualified 2nd, etc.

=== Driver standings ===
Pos	Driver	STP	LBH	KAN	INDY	MIL	TMS	IOW	RIC	WGL	TOR	EDM	KEN	MOH	SON	CHI	MOT	HOM	Pts
1	(United Kingdom) Dario Franchitti	4	1*	18	7	3	**5**	1	**2**	15	**1***	5	6	3	**1***	4	2	**1**	616
2	(New Zealand) Scott Dixon	16	15	1*	6*	1	3	5	1*	3	4	3	**7***^{1}	1*	13	2	**1***	3	605
3	(Australia) Ryan Briscoe	1	13	4	15	**2***	2*	2*	19	**2**	2	4	1	**2**	2	**1***	18	2*	604
4	(Brazil) Hélio Castroneves		7	2	**1**	11	1	**7**^{1}	17	4	18	2	4	12	18	20	10	5	433
5	(United States) Danica Patrick	19	4	5	3	5	6	9	5	11	6	11	8	19	16	12	6	19	393
6	(Brazil) Tony Kanaan	5	3	3	27	19	8	14	6	8	17	21	3	10	8	13	11	4	386
7	(United States) Graham Rahal	**7**	12	**7**	31	4	22	11	3	13	20	7	5	8	21	5	3	11	385
8	(United States) Marco Andretti	13	6	6	30	7	4	12	7	5	8	10	10	6	14	11	7	22	380
9	(United Kingdom) Justin Wilson	3*	22	14	23	15	15	18	14	1*	5	8	21	13	7	10	12	10	354
10	(United Kingdom) Dan Wheldon	14	5	10	2	10	7	4	10	10	14	15	11	16	12	22	8	21	354
11	(Japan) Hideki Mutoh	15	20	8	10	8	21	3	4	18	12	14	13	5	5	23	14	6	353
12	(United States) Ed Carpenter	18	18	9	8	16	9	10	13	16	15	16	2	17	11	6	13	12	321
13	(Brazil) Raphael Matos RY	20	8	20	22	6	12	16	8	12	10	18	16	9	9	9	9	14	312
14	(Brazil) Mario Moraes	21	19	11	33	9	10	17	16	14	11	23	18		4	3	5	7	304
15	(United States) Ryan Hunter-Reay	2	11	15	32	12	16	19	15	21	7	17	14	4	19	15	21	13	298
16	(Netherlands) Robert Doornbos R	11	9	12	28	14	11	15	9	9	23	9	19	14	10	18	16	20	283
17	(United Kingdom) Mike Conway R	22	21	19	18	20	19	8	18	6	22	20	17	20	3	16	22	15	261
18	(Venezuela) E. J. Viso	17	23	21	24	18	24	20	12	7	13	12	15	15	22	17	15	16	248
19	(Australia) Will Power	6	**2**		5						3	**1***	9		Wth				215
20	(South Africa) Tomas Scheckter				12	13	13	6	11		16	19	22			8	23	9	195
21	(Spain) Oriol Servià				26									11	6	7	4		115
22	(Canada) Alex Tagliani	10	10		11		14				9	13							114
23	(Canada) Paul Tracy				9	17				20	19	6		7					113
24	(Venezuela) Milka Duno			16	20		23			17			20	21	17	21		17	113
25	(United States) Sarah Fisher			13	17		17						12			14		18	89
26	(United States) Jaques Lazier						18	13	20				23			19		23	77
27	(United States) Richard Antinucci R									19	21	22		18	15				63
28	(Brazil) Vítor Meira	9	14	22	21														62
29	(United States) Stanton Barrett R	12	17	17	DNQ	Wth											19		62
30	(United Kingdom) Alex Lloyd R				13													8	41
31	(United Kingdom) Darren Manning	8	16																38
32	(United States) Townsend Bell				4														32
33	(United States) A. J. Foyt IV				16		20												26
34	(United States) Scott Sharp				14														16
35	(France) Nelson Philippe R				25										Wth				16
36	(Japan) Kosuke Matsuura																17		13
37	(United States) John Andretti				19														12
38	(France) Franck Montagny R														20				12
39	(United States) Roger Yasukawa																20		12
40	(United States) Davey Hamilton				29														10
—	(Brazil) Bruno Junqueira				Wth														0
—	(United States) Buddy Lazier				DNQ														0
Pos	Driver	STP	LBH	KAN	INDY	MIL	TMS	IOW	RIC	WGL	TOR	EDM	KEN	MOH	SON	CHI	MOT	HOM	Pts

Color	Result
Gold	Winner
Silver	2nd place
Bronze	3rd place
Green	4th & 5th place
Light Blue	6th–10th place
Dark Blue	Finished (Outside Top 10)
Purple	Did not finish
Red	Did not qualify (DNQ)
Brown	Withdrawn (Wth)
Black	Disqualified (DSQ)
White	Did Not Start (DNS)
White	Race abandoned (C)
Blank	Did not participate

**In-line notation**
**Bold**	Pole position (1 point; except Indy).
Italics	Ran fastest race lap
*	Led most race laps (2 points)
DNS	Any driver who qualifies but does not start (DNS), earns half the points had they taken part.
^{c}	Qualifying canceled no bonus point awarded
RY Rookie of the Year
R Rookie

=== Entrant standings ===
- Based on the entrant, used for oval qualifications order, and starting grids when qualifying is cancelled
- Only full-time entrants, and at-large part-time entrants shown.

Pos	Driver	STP	LBH	KAN	INDY	MIL	TMS	IOW	RIC	WGL	TOR	EDM	KEN	MOH	SON	CHI	MOT	HOM	Pts
1	#10 Chip Ganassi Racing	4	1*	18	7	3	**5**	1	**2**	15	**1***	5	6	3	**1***	4	2	**1**	616
2	#9 Chip Ganassi Racing	16	15	1*	6*	1	3	5	1*	3	4	3	**7***^{1}	1*	13	2	**1***	3	605
3	#6 Team Penske	1	13	4	15	**2***	2*	2*	19	**2**	2	4	1	**2**	2	**1***	18	2*	604
4	#3 Team Penske	6	7	2	**1**	11	1	**7**^{1}	17	4	18	2	4	12	18	20	10	5	461
5	#7 Andretti Autosport	19	4	5	3	5	6	9	5	11	6	11	8	19	16	12	6	19	393
6	#11 Andretti Autosport	5	3	3	27	19	8	14	6	8	17	21	3	10	8	13	11	4	386
7	#02 Newman/Haas Racing	**7**	12	**7**	31	4	22	11	3	13	20	7	5	8	21	5	3	11	385
8	#26 Andretti Autosport	13	6	6	30	7	4	12	7	5	8	10	10	6	14	11	7	22	380
9	#18 Dale Coyne Racing	3*	22	14	23	15	15	18	14	1*	5	8	21	13	7	10	12	10	354
10	#4 Panther Racing	14	5	10	2	10	7	4	10	10	14	15	11	16	12	22	8	21	354
11	#27 Andretti Autosport	15	20	8	10	8	21	3	4	18	12	14	13	5	5	23	14	6	353
12	#06 Newman/Haas Racing	11	9	12	28	14	11	15	9	9	23	9	19	11	6	7	4	8	338
13	#5 KV Racing Technology	21	19	11	33	9	10	17	16	14	11	23	18	7	4	3	5	7	330
14	#20 Vision Racing	18	18	9	8	16	9	10	13	16	15	16	2	17	11	6	13	12	321
15	#2 Luczo Dragon Racing	20	8	20	22	6	12	16	8	12	10	18	16	9	9	9	9	14	312
16	#14 A. J. Foyt Enterprises	9	14	22	21	17	20	19	15	21	7	17	14	4	19	15	21	13	269
17	#24 Dreyer & Reinbold Racing	22	21	19	18	20	19	8	18	6	22	20	17	20	3	16	22	15	261
18	#23 Dreyer & Reinbold Racing	8	16	16	20	13	23	6	11	17	16	19	20	21	17	21	23	17	253
19	#13 HVM Racing	17	23	21	24	18	24	20	12	7	13	12	15	15	22	17	15	16	248
20	#98 Team 3G	12	17	17	DNQ	Wth	18	13	20	19	21	22	23	18	15	19	19	23	202
21	#12 Team Penske		**2**		5						3	**1***	9		Wth				187
22	#34 Conquest Racing	10	10		11		14				9	13			Wth		17		133
23	#21 Vision Racing	2	11	15	32	12	16												116
24	#43 Dreyer & Reinbold Racing				19		13						22			8	20	9	99
25	#67 Sarah Fisher Racing			13	17		17						12			14		18	89
26	#15 KV Racing Technology				9					20	19	6							87
27	#33 HVM Racing													14	10	18	16	20	74
Pos	Driver	STP	LBH	KAN	INDY	MIL	TMS	IOW	RIC	WGL	TOR	EDM	KEN	MOH	SON	CHI	MOT	HOM	Pts

== See also ==
- 2009 Indianapolis 500
- 2009 Indy Lights season
- 2009 Atlantic Championship season
