= 2009 Meijer Indy 300 =

(United States) 2009 Kentucky
Race details
- 12th round of the 2009 IndyCar Series season
- Date: August 1, 2009
- Official name: Meijer Indy 300
- Location: Kentucky Speedway, Sparta, Kentucky
- Course: Permanent racing facility 1.480 mi / 2.382 km
- Distance: 200 laps 296 mi / 476.366 km
- Weather: 76 °F (24 °C), overcast

Pole position
- Driver: (New Zealand) Scott Dixon (Chip Ganassi Racing)
- Time: set by owner points

Fastest lap
- Driver: (United States) Ed Carpenter (Vision Racing)
- Time: 24.3847 (on lap 8 of 200)

Podium
- First: (Australia) Ryan Briscoe (Penske Racing)
- Second: (United States) Ed Carpenter (Vision Racing)
- Third: (Brazil) Tony Kanaan (Andretti Green Racing)

The 2009 Meijer Indy 300 presented by Red Baron and Edy's was the twelfth round of the 2009 IndyCar Series season, and was held on August 1, 2009, at the 1.480-mile (2.382 km) Kentucky Speedway in Sparta, Kentucky.

== Grid ==
Row	Inside		Outside	
1	9	(New Zealand) Scott Dixon	10	(United Kingdom) Dario Franchitti
2	6	(Australia) Ryan Briscoe	3	(Brazil) Hélio Castroneves
3	7	(United States) Danica Patrick	26	(United States) Marco Andretti
4	4	(United Kingdom) Dan Wheldon	18	(United Kingdom) Justin Wilson
5	11	(Brazil) Tony Kanaan	02	(United States) Graham Rahal
6	27	(Japan) Hideki Mutoh	06	(Netherlands) Robert Doornbos (R)
7	2	(Brazil) Raphael Matos (R)	20	(United States) Ed Carpenter
8	23	(Venezuela) Milka Duno	5	(Brazil) Mario Moraes
9	14	(United States) Ryan Hunter-Reay	13	(Venezuela) E. J. Viso
10	24	(United Kingdom) Mike Conway (R)	12	(Australia) Will Power
11	98	(United States) Jaques Lazier	67	(United States) Sarah Fisher
12	43	(South Africa) Tomas Scheckter		

== Race ==
Pos	No.	Driver	Team	Laps	Time/Retired	Grid	Laps Led	Points
1	6	(Australia) Ryan Briscoe	Penske Racing	200	1:28:24:3246	3	38	50
2	20	(United States) Ed Carpenter	Vision Racing	200	+ 0.0162	14	35	40
3	11	(Brazil) Tony Kanaan	Andretti Green Racing	200	+ 0.1614	9	1	35
4	3	(Brazil) Hélio Castroneves	Penske Racing	200	+ 0.2728	4	1	32
5	02	(United States) Graham Rahal	Newman/Haas/Lanigan Racing	200	+ 0.6346	10	0	30
6	10	(United Kingdom) Dario Franchitti	Chip Ganassi Racing	200	+ 1.7670	2	0	28
7	9	(New Zealand) Scott Dixon	Chip Ganassi Racing	200	+ 3.2512	1	94	28
8	7	(United States) Danica Patrick	Andretti Green Racing	200	+ 4.7231	5	2	24
9	12	(Australia) Will Power	Penske Racing	200	+ 6.1424	20	30	22
10	26	(United States) Marco Andretti	Andretti Green Racing	200	+ 6.9963	6	0	20
11	4	(United Kingdom) Dan Wheldon	Panther Racing	200	+ 12.7597	7	0	19
12	67	(United States) Sarah Fisher	Sarah Fisher Racing	200	+ 15.9732	22	0	18
13	27	(Japan) Hideki Mutoh	Andretti Green Racing	200	+ 27.9705	11	0	17
14	14	(United States) Ryan Hunter-Reay	A. J. Foyt Enterprises	197	+ 3 Laps	17	0	16
15	13	(Venezuela) E. J. Viso	HVM Racing	197	+ 3 Laps	18	0	15
16	2	(Brazil) Raphael Matos (R)	Luczo-Dragon Racing	196	+ 4 Laps	13	0	14
17	24	(United Kingdom) Mike Conway (R)	Dreyer & Reinbold Racing	192	+ 8 Laps	19	0	13
18	5	(Brazil) Mario Moraes	KV Racing Technology	188	+ 12 Laps	16	0	12
19	06	(Netherlands) Robert Doornbos (R)	Newman/Haas/Lanigan Racing	185	+ 15 Laps	12	0	12
20	23	(Venezuela) Milka Duno	Dreyer & Reinbold Racing	165	+ 35 Laps	15	0	12
21	18	(United Kingdom) Justin Wilson	Dale Coyne Racing	120	Mechanical	8	0	12
22	43	(South Africa) Tomas Scheckter	Dreyer & Reinbold Racing	59	Mechanical	23	0	12
23	98	(United States) Jaques Lazier	Team 3G	43	Mechanical	21	0	12
OFFICIAL IRL REPORT

== Standings after the race ==
Drivers' Championship standings

Pos	Driver	Points
1	(Australia) Ryan Briscoe	416
2	(New Zealand) Scott Dixon	408
3	(United Kingdom) Dario Franchitti	405
4	(Brazil) Hélio Castroneves	341
5	(United States) Danica Patrick	309

Previous race: 2009 Rexall Edmonton Indy	IndyCar Series; 2009 season	Next race: 2009 Honda 200
Previous race: 2008 Meijer Indy 300	Meijer Indy 300	Next race: 2010 Kentucky Indy 300
