= 2009 Camping World Grand Prix at the Glen =

(United States) 2009 Watkins Glen
Race details
- 9th round of the 2009 IndyCar Series season
- Date: July 5, 2009
- Official name: Camping World Watkins Glen Grand Prix
- Location: Watkins Glen International
- Course: Road Course; 3.370 mi / 5.423 km
- Distance: 60 laps 202.200 mi / 325.409 km
- Weather: 71 °F (22 °C), fair

Pole position
- Driver: (Australia) Ryan Briscoe (Team Penske)
- Time: 1:28.5970

Fastest lap
- Driver: (Australia) Ryan Briscoe (Team Penske)
- Time: 1:31.1760 (on lap 18 of 60)

Podium
- First: (United Kingdom) Justin Wilson (Dale Coyne Racing)
- Second: (Australia) Ryan Briscoe (Team Penske)
- Third: (New Zealand) Scott Dixon (Chip Ganassi Racing)

The 2009 Camping World Indy Grand Prix at the Glen was the ninth round of the 2009 IndyCar Series season. It took place on July 5, 2009, at the 3.370-mile (5.423 km) Watkins Glen International road course in Watkins Glen, New York.

== Race ==
Pos	No.	Driver	Team	Laps	Time/Retired	Grid	Laps Led	Points
1	18	(United Kingdom) Justin Wilson	Dale Coyne Racing	60	1:48:24.1947	2	49	52
2	6	(Australia) Ryan Briscoe	Penske Racing	60	+ 4.9906	1	7	41
3	9	(New Zealand) Scott Dixon	Chip Ganassi Racing	60	+ 5.1632	3	1	35
4	3	(Brazil) Hélio Castroneves	Penske Racing	60	+ 7.0755	13	1	32
5	26	(United States) Marco Andretti	Andretti Green Racing	60	+ 8.5595	8	2	30
6	24	(United Kingdom) Mike Conway (R)	Dreyer & Reinbold Racing	60	+ 9.3646	6	0	28
7	13	(Venezuela) E. J. Viso	HVM Racing	60	+ 11.3804	10	0	26
8	11	(Brazil) Tony Kanaan	Andretti Green Racing	60	+ 13.0020	9	0	24
9	06	(Netherlands) Robert Doornbos (R)	Newman/Haas/Lanigan Racing	60	+ 13.2633	17	0	22
10	4	(United Kingdom) Dan Wheldon	Panther Racing	60	+ 18.0412	11	0	20
11	7	(United States) Danica Patrick	Andretti Green Racing	60	+ 18.5656	7	0	19
12	2	(Brazil) Raphael Matos (R)	Luczo-Dragon Racing	60	+ 18.9342	18	0	18
13	02	(United States) Graham Rahal	Newman/Haas/Lanigan Racing	60	+ 23.0413	15	0	17
14	5	(Brazil) Mario Moraes	KV Racing Technology	60	+ 23.3821	4	0	16
15	10	(United Kingdom) Dario Franchitti	Chip Ganassi Racing	59	+ 1 Lap	5	0	15
16	20	(United States) Ed Carpenter	Vision Racing	59	+ 1 Lap	21	0	14
17	23	(Venezuela) Milka Duno	Dreyer & Reinbold Racing	58	+ 2 Laps	19	0	13
18	27	(Japan) Hideki Mutoh	Andretti Green Racing	51	Contact	12	0	12
19	98	(United States) Richard Antinucci (R)	Team 3G	47	+ 13 Laps	20	0	12
20	15	(Canada) Paul Tracy	KV Racing Technology	29	Contact	14	0	12
21	14	(United States) Ryan Hunter-Reay	A. J. Foyt Enterprises	0	Contact	16	0	12
OFFICIAL IRL REPORT

== Standings after the race ==
Drivers' Championship standings

Pos	Driver	Points
1	(New Zealand) Scott Dixon	313
2	(United Kingdom) Dario Franchitti	294
3	(Australia) Ryan Briscoe	294
4	(Brazil) Hélio Castroneves	257
5	(United States) Danica Patrick	238

- Note: Only the top five positions are included for the standings.

Previous race: 2009 SunTrust Indy Challenge	IndyCar Series; 2009 season	Next race: 2009 Honda Indy Toronto
Previous race: 2008 Camping World Watkins Glen Grand Prix	2009 Camping World Watkins Glen Grand Prix	Next race: 2010 Camping World Watkins Glen Grand Prix
