= 2009 Peak Antifreeze & Motor Oil Indy 300 =

(United States) 2009 Chicagoland
Race details
- 15th round of the 2009 IndyCar Series season
- Date: August 29, 2009
- Official name: Peak Antifreeze & Motor Oil Indy 300
- Location: Chicagoland Speedway, Joliet, Illinois
- Course: Permanent racing facility 1.520 mi / 2.446 km
- Distance: 200 laps 304 mi / 489.200 km

Pole position
- Driver: (Australia) Ryan Briscoe (Penske Racing)
- Time: 1:41.6327 (4 laps)

Fastest lap
- Driver: (South Africa) Tomas Scheckter (Dreyer & Reinbold)
- Time: 25.0567 (on lap 193 of 200)

Podium
- First: (Australia) Ryan Briscoe (Penske Racing)
- Second: (New Zealand) Scott Dixon (Chip Ganassi Racing)
- Third: (Brazil) Mario Moraes (KV Racing)

The 2009 Peak Antifreeze & Motor Oil Indy 300 was the fifteenth round of the 2009 IndyCar Series season, and was held on August 29, 2009 at the 1.520-mile (2.446 km) Chicagoland Speedway in Joliet, Illinois. The race was won by Ryan Briscoe who beat Scott Dixon on the last lap to win by only 0.0077 of a second.

== Grid ==
Row	Inside		Outside	
1	6	(Australia) Ryan Briscoe	3	(Brazil) Hélio Castroneves
2	10	(United Kingdom) Dario Franchitti	11	(Brazil) Tony Kanaan
3	02	(United States) Graham Rahal	9	(New Zealand) Scott Dixon
4	26	(United States) Marco Andretti	5	(Brazil) Mario Moraes
5	06	(Spain) Oriol Servià	7	(United States) Danica Patrick
6	4	(United Kingdom) Dan Wheldon	20	(United States) Ed Carpenter
7	27	(Japan) Hideki Mutoh	43	(South Africa) Tomas Scheckter
8	18	(United Kingdom) Justin Wilson	24	(United Kingdom) Mike Conway (R)
9	2	(Brazil) Raphael Matos (R)	14	(United States) Ryan Hunter-Reay
10	67	(United States) Sarah Fisher	13	(Venezuela) E. J. Viso
11	23	(Venezuela) Milka Duno	33	(Netherlands) Robert Doornbos (R)
12	98	(United States) Jaques Lazier		

== Race ==
Pos	No.	Driver	Team	Laps	Time/Retired	Grid	Laps Led	Points
1	6	(Australia) Ryan Briscoe	Penske Racing	200	1:42:34.3051	1	71	53
2	9	(New Zealand) Scott Dixon	Chip Ganassi Racing	200	+ 0.0077	6	61	40
3	5	(Brazil) Mario Moraes	KV Racing Technology	200	+ 0.0699	8	0	35
4	10	(United Kingdom) Dario Franchitti	Chip Ganassi Racing	200	+ 0.0997	3	34	32
5	02	(United States) Graham Rahal	Newman/Haas/Lanigan Racing	200	+ 0.1295	5	0	30
6	20	(United States) Ed Carpenter	Vision Racing	200	+ 0.1668	12	0	28
7	06	(Spain) Oriol Servià	Newman/Haas/Lanigan Racing	200	+ 0.2612	9	0	26
8	43	(South Africa) Tomas Scheckter	Dreyer & Reinbold Racing	200	+ 0.2683	14	4	24
9	2	(Brazil) Raphael Matos (R)	Luczo-Dragon Racing	200	+ 0.3356	17	0	22
10	18	(United Kingdom) Justin Wilson	Dale Coyne Racing	200	+ 0.4344	15	0	20
11	26	(United States) Marco Andretti	Andretti Green Racing	200	+ 0.5224	7	0	19
12	7	(United States) Danica Patrick	Andretti Green Racing	200	+ 0.5840	10	0	18
13	11	(Brazil) Tony Kanaan	Andretti Green Racing	200	+ 0.8269	4	7	17
14	67	(United States) Sarah Fisher	Sarah Fisher Racing	199	+ 1 Lap	19	0	16
15	14	(United States) Ryan Hunter-Reay	A. J. Foyt Enterprises	199	+ 1 Lap	18	0	15
16	24	(United Kingdom) Mike Conway (R)	Dreyer & Reinbold Racing	199	+ 1 Lap	16	0	14
17	13	(Venezuela) E. J. Viso	HVM Racing	198	+ 2 Laps	20	0	13
18	33	(Netherlands) Robert Doornbos (R)	HVM Racing	197	+ 3 Laps	22	0	12
19	98	(United States) Jaques Lazier	Team 3G	195	+ 5 Laps	23	0	12
20	3	(Brazil) Hélio Castroneves	Penske Racing	184	Contact	2	23	12
21	23	(Venezuela) Milka Duno	Dreyer & Reinbold Racing	155	Mechanical	21	0	12
22	4	(United Kingdom) Dan Wheldon	Panther Racing	95	Mechanical	11	0	12
23	27	(Japan) Hideki Mutoh	Andretti Green Racing	90	Contact	13	0	12
OFFICIAL IRL REPORT

== Standings after the race ==
Drivers' Championship standings

Pos	Driver	Points
1	(Australia) Ryan Briscoe	550
2	(United Kingdom) Dario Franchitti	525
3	(New Zealand) Scott Dixon	517
4	(Brazil) Hélio Castroneves	383
5	(United States) Danica Patrick	353

Previous race: 2009 Indy Grand Prix of Sonoma	IndyCar Series; 2009 season	Next race: 2009 Indy Japan 300
Previous race: 2008 Peak Antifreeze Indy 300	Peak Antifreeze Indy 300	Next race: 2010 Peak Antifreeze Indy 300
