= 2009 Honda 200 =

(United States) 2009 Mid-Ohio
Race details
- 13th round of the 2009 IndyCar Series season
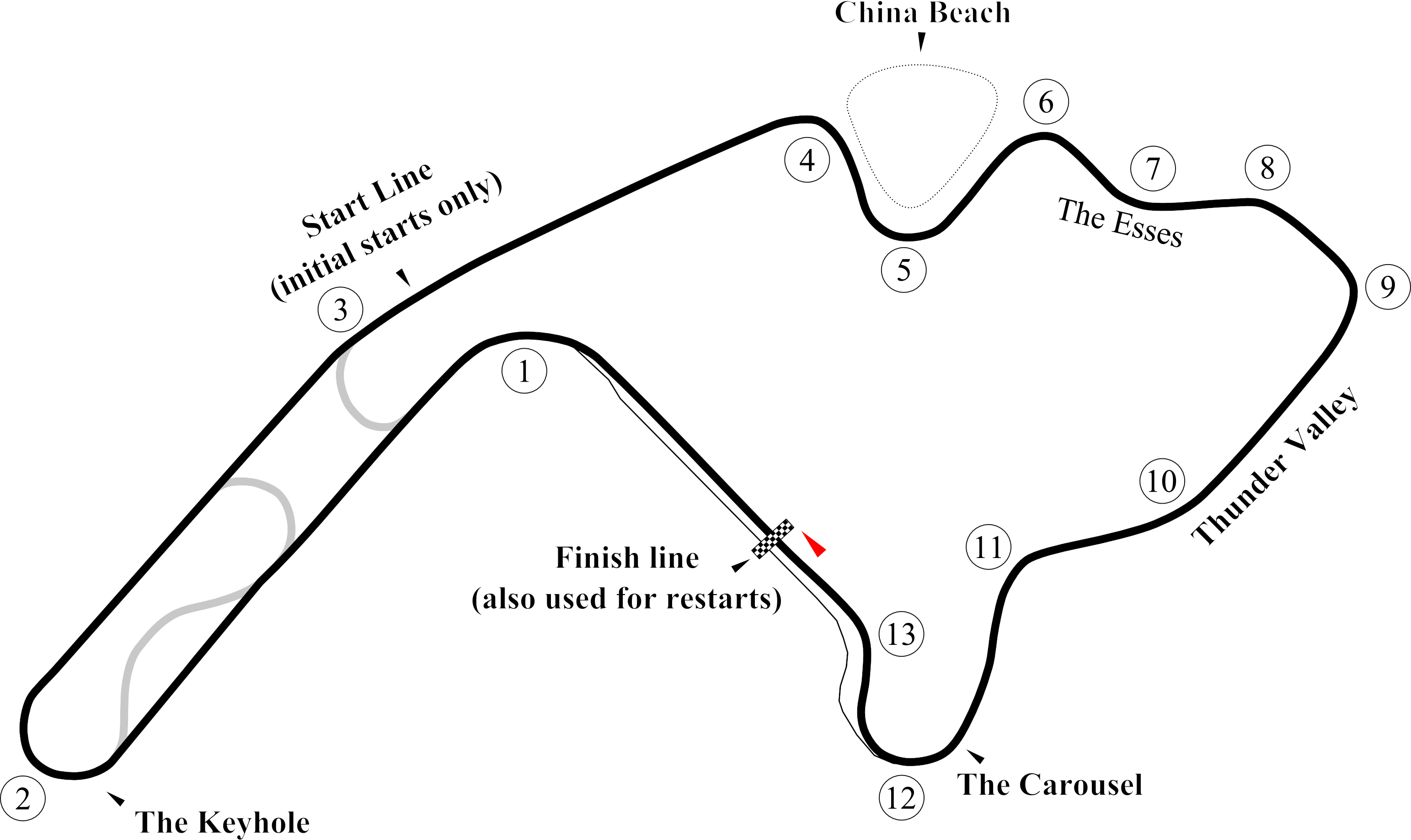
- Date: August 9, 2009
- Official name: Honda 200
- Location: Mid-Ohio Sports Car Course, Lexington, Ohio
- Course: Permanent racing facility 2.258 mi / 3.634 km
- Distance: 85 laps 191.930 mi / 308.881 km
- Weather: 91 °F (33 °C), partly cloudy

Pole position
- Driver: (Australia) Ryan Briscoe (Penske Racing)
- Time: 1:06.6814

Fastest lap
- Driver: (New Zealand) Scott Dixon (Chip Ganassi Racing)
- Time: 1:08.5600 (on lap 62 of 85)

Podium
- First: (New Zealand) Scott Dixon (Chip Ganassi Racing)
- Second: (Australia) Ryan Briscoe (Penske Racing)
- Third: (United Kingdom) Dario Franchitti (Chip Ganassi Racing)

The 2009 Honda Indy 200 presented by Westfield Insurance was the thirteenth round of the 17-race 2009 IndyCar Series season, and was held on August 9, 2009 at the 2.258-mile (3.634 km) Mid-Ohio Sports Car Course in Lexington, Ohio.

The race saw the return of Oriol Servià, who replaced Robert Doornbos in the #06 Newman/Haas/Lanigan Racing machine. Doornbos moved to the #33 car run by HVM Racing, with whom he had success in the 2007 Champ Car season. Paul Tracy replaced Mario Moraes in the #5 car for KV Racing Technology, as Moraes was in Brazil following the death of his father.

Scott Dixon won his 20th IRL-sanctioned race after dominating the race for the last 49 laps, winning by nearly half a minute from championship rivals Ryan Briscoe and Dario Franchitti. Dixon's win gave him the championship lead by three points from Briscoe and also saw him surpass Sam Hornish Jr.'s tally of 19 career IRL victories.

== Grid ==
Row	Inside		Outside	
1	6	(Australia) Ryan Briscoe	18	(United Kingdom) Justin Wilson
2	9	(New Zealand) Scott Dixon	02	(United States) Graham Rahal
3	3	(Brazil) Hélio Castroneves	10	(United Kingdom) Dario Franchitti
4	14	(United States) Ryan Hunter-Reay	11	(Brazil) Tony Kanaan
5	13	(Venezuela) E. J. Viso	5	(Canada) Paul Tracy
6	27	(Japan) Hideki Mutoh	7	(United States) Danica Patrick
7	26	(United States) Marco Andretti	06	(Spain) Oriol Servià
8	2	(Brazil) Raphael Matos (R)	24	(United Kingdom) Mike Conway (R)
9	4	(United Kingdom) Dan Wheldon	33	(Netherlands) Robert Doornbos (R)
10	98	(United States) Richard Antinucci (R)	23	(Venezuela) Milka Duno
11	20	(United States) Ed Carpenter		

== Race ==
Pos	No.	Driver	Team	Laps	Time/Retired	Grid	Laps Led	Points
1	9	(New Zealand) Scott Dixon	Chip Ganassi Racing	85	1:46:05.7985	3	51	52
2	6	(Australia) Ryan Briscoe	Penske Racing	85	+ 29.7803	1	6	41
3	10	(United Kingdom) Dario Franchitti	Chip Ganassi Racing	85	+ 30.0551	6	0	35
4	14	(United States) Ryan Hunter-Reay	A. J. Foyt Enterprises	85	+ 33.7307	7	0	32
5	27	(Japan) Hideki Mutoh	Andretti Green Racing	85	+ 34.1839	11	0	30
6	26	(United States) Marco Andretti	Andretti Green Racing	85	+ 46.7669	13	0	28
7	5	(Canada) Paul Tracy	KV Racing Technology	85	+ 49.7020	10	0	26
8	02	(United States) Graham Rahal	Newman/Haas/Lanigan Racing	85	+ 50.4517	4	0	24
9	2	(Brazil) Raphael Matos (R)	Luczo-Dragon Racing	85	+ 51.2286	15	0	22
10	11	(Brazil) Tony Kanaan	Andretti Green Racing	85	+ 52.0810	8	0	20
11	06	(Spain) Oriol Servià	Newman/Haas/Lanigan Racing	85	+ 52.6215	14	0	19
12	3	(Brazil) Hélio Castroneves	Penske Racing	85	+ 53.2362	5	0	18
13	18	(United Kingdom) Justin Wilson	Dale Coyne Racing	85	+ 53.5768	2	28	17
14	33	(Netherlands) Robert Doornbos (R)	HVM Racing	85	+ 1:10.0812	18	0	16
15	13	(Venezuela) E. J. Viso	HVM Racing	84	+ 1 Lap	9	0	15
16	4	(United Kingdom) Dan Wheldon	Panther Racing	84	+ 1 Lap	17	0	14
17	20	(United States) Ed Carpenter	Vision Racing	84	+ 1 Lap	21	0	13
18	98	(United States) Richard Antinucci	Team 3G	83	+ 2 Laps	19	0	12
19	7	(United States) Danica Patrick	Andretti Green Racing	83	+ 2 Laps	12	0	12
20	24	(United Kingdom) Mike Conway (R)	Dreyer & Reinbold Racing	69	Mechanical	16	0	12
21	23	(Venezuela) Milka Duno	Dreyer & Reinbold Racing	56	Handling	20	0	12
OFFICIAL IRL REPORT

== Standings after the race ==
Drivers' Championship standings

Pos	Driver	Points
1	(New Zealand) Scott Dixon	460
2	(Australia) Ryan Briscoe	457
3	(United Kingdom) Dario Franchitti	440
4	(Brazil) Hélio Castroneves	359
5	(United States) Danica Patrick	321

Previous race: 2009 Meijer Indy 300	IndyCar Series; 2009 season	Next race: 2009 PEAK Antifreeze & Motor Oil; Indy Grand Prix of Sonoma County
Previous race: 2008 Honda 200	Honda 200	Next race: 2010 Honda 200
