= 2009 Indy Grand Prix of Sonoma =

(United States) 2009 Sonoma
Race details
- 14th round of the 2009 IndyCar Series season
- Date: August 23, 2009
- Official name: Indy Grand Prix of Sonoma
- Location: Infineon Raceway, Sonoma, California
- Course: Permanent racing facility 2.303 mi / 3.706 km
- Distance: 75 laps 172.725 mi / 277.950 km
- Weather: 69 °F (21 °C), fair

Pole position
- Driver: (United Kingdom) Dario Franchitti (Chip Ganassi Racing)
- Time: 1:16.7987

Fastest lap
- Driver: (Brazil) Hélio Castroneves (Penske Racing)
- Time: 1:18.8427 (on lap 35 of 75)

Podium
- First: (United Kingdom) Dario Franchitti (Chip Ganassi Racing)
- Second: (Australia) Ryan Briscoe (Penske Racing)
- Third: (United Kingdom) Mike Conway (Dreyer & Reinbold)

The 2009 Indy Grand Prix of Sonoma was the fourteenth round of the 17-race 2009 IndyCar Series season, and was held on August 23, 2009 at the 2.303-mile (3.706 km) Infineon Raceway in Sonoma, California. Will Power and Nelson Philippe both missed the race, after they were hospitalized after a practice accident on Saturday. Philippe spun at the blind turn 3A, and stalled the car on-track. E. J. Viso hit the Frenchman's car, before Power t-boned it a few seconds later. Power suffered fractures to two lumbar vertebrae, Philippe fractured his left foot and Viso escaped uninjured.

== Grid ==
Row	Inside		Outside	
1	10	(United Kingdom) Dario Franchitti	6	(Australia) Ryan Briscoe
2	3	(Brazil) Hélio Castroneves	26	(United States) Marco Andretti
3	27	(Japan) Hideki Mutoh	02	(United States) Graham Rahal
4	11	(Brazil) Tony Kanaan	25	(France) Franck Montagny (R)
5	24	(United Kingdom) Mike Conway (R)	9	(New Zealand) Scott Dixon
6	7	(United States) Danica Patrick	4	(United Kingdom) Dan Wheldon
7	13	(Venezuela) E. J. Viso	5	(Brazil) Mario Moraes
8	33	(Netherlands) Robert Doornbos (R)	14	(United States) Ryan Hunter-Reay
9	06	(Spain) Oriol Servià	2	(Brazil) Raphael Matos (R)
10	18	(United Kingdom) Justin Wilson	98	(United States) Richard Antinucci (R)
11	20	(United States) Ed Carpenter	23	(Venezuela) Milka Duno

== Race ==
Pos	No.	Driver	Team	Laps	Time/Retired	Grid	Laps Led	Points
1	10	(United Kingdom) Dario Franchitti	Chip Ganassi Racing	75	1:49:23.0073	1	75	53
2	6	(Australia) Ryan Briscoe	Penske Racing	75	+ 0.2488	2	0	40
3	24	(United Kingdom) Mike Conway (R)	Dreyer & Reinbold Racing	75	+ 0.8293	9	0	35
4	5	(Brazil) Mario Moraes	KV Racing Technology	75	+ 3.6171	14	0	32
5	27	(Japan) Hideki Mutoh	Andretti Green Racing	75	+ 5.4536	5	0	30
6	06	(Spain) Oriol Servià	Newman/Haas/Lanigan Racing	75	+ 6.3801	17	0	28
7	18	(United Kingdom) Justin Wilson	Dale Coyne Racing	75	+ 6.6997	22	0	26
8	11	(Brazil) Tony Kanaan	Andretti Green Racing	75	+ 7.1808	7	0	24
9	2	(Brazil) Raphael Matos (R)	Luczo-Dragon Racing	75	+ 8.5936	18	0	22
10	33	(Netherlands) Robert Doornbos (R)	HVM Racing	75	+ 10.8175	15	0	20
11	20	(United States) Ed Carpenter	Vision Racing	75	+ 11.3688	20	0	19
12	4	(United Kingdom) Dan Wheldon	Panther Racing	75	+ 12.4000	12	0	18
13	9	(New Zealand) Scott Dixon	Chip Ganassi Racing	75	+ 13.8968	10	0	17
14	26	(United States) Marco Andretti	Andretti Green Racing	75	+ 14.8971*	4	0	16
15	98	(United States) Richard Antinucci	Team 3G	75	+ 19.0650	19	0	15
16	7	(United States) Danica Patrick	Andretti Green Racing	74	+ 1 Lap	11	0	14
17	23	(Venezuela) Milka Duno	Dreyer & Reinbold Racing	71	+ 4 Laps	21	0	13
18	3	(Brazil) Hélio Castroneves	Penske Racing	66	Contact	3	0	12
19	14	(United States) Ryan Hunter-Reay	A. J. Foyt Enterprises	65	Mechanical	16	0	12
20	25	(France) Franck Montagny (R)	Andretti Green Racing	57	Handling	8	0	12
21	02	(United States) Graham Rahal	Newman/Haas/Lanigan Racing	30	Mechanical	6	0	12
22	13	(Venezuela) E. J. Viso	HVM Racing	0	Contact	13	0	12
23	12	(Australia) Will Power	Penske Racing	DNS	-	23	-	6
24	34	(France) Nelson Philippe (R)	Conquest Racing	DNS	-	24	-	6
OFFICIAL IRL REPORT

- * Marco Andretti was originally scored in eleventh, but was demoted behind Scott Dixon after the pair collided on the final lap.

== Standings after the race ==
Drivers' Championship standings

Pos	Driver	Points
1	(Australia) Ryan Briscoe	497
2	(United Kingdom) Dario Franchitti	493
3	(New Zealand) Scott Dixon	477
4	(Brazil) Hélio Castroneves	371
5	(United States) Danica Patrick	335

Previous race: 2009 Honda Indy 200	IndyCar Series; 2009 season	Next race: 2009 Peak Antifreeze & Motor Oil Indy 300
Previous race: 2008 Peak Antifreeze Indy Grand Prix	Indy Grand Prix of Sonoma	Next race: 2010 Indy Grand Prix of Sonoma
