= 2009 ABC Supply Company A.J. Foyt 225 =

(United States) 2009 Milwaukee
Race details
- 5th round of the 2009 IndyCar Series season
- Date: May 31, 2009
- Official name: ABC Supply Company A.J. Foyt 225
- Location: The Milwaukee Mile
- Course: Permanent racing facility 1.000 mi / 1.609 km
- Distance: 225 laps 225 mi / 362.102 km
- Weather: Temperatures reaching up to 69.8 °F (21.0 °C); wind speeds approaching 13 miles per hour (21 km/h)

Pole position
- Driver: (Australia) Ryan Briscoe (Team Penske)
- Time: 1:26.7966 (4 laps)

Fastest lap
- Driver: (New Zealand) Scott Dixon (Chip Ganassi Racing)
- Time: 22.2788 (on lap 177 of 225)

Podium
- First: (New Zealand) Scott Dixon (Chip Ganassi Racing)
- Second: (Australia) Ryan Briscoe (Team Penske)
- Third: (United Kingdom) Dario Franchitti (Chip Ganassi Racing)

Chronology
Previous	Next
2008	2011

The 2009 ABC Supply Company A.J. Foyt 225 was the fifth round of the 2009 IndyCar Series season, held on May 31, 2009, at the 1.015-mile (1.633 km) Milwaukee Mile, in West Allis, Wisconsin.

== Qualifying results ==
- Note: Briscoe and Rahal broke the previous four-lap qualifying record set last year by Marco Andretti at 1:26.9591 sec (168.079 mph).
- Best lap shown in **bold**.

Pos	##	Name	Team	Lap One	Lap Two	Lap Three	Lap Four	Total Time	Avg. Speed
1	6	(Australia) Ryan Briscoe	Penske Racing	21.8041	21.6872	**21.6202**	21.6851	1:26.7966	168.394 mph
2	02	(United States) Graham Rahal	Newman/Haas/Lanigan Racing	21.7247	21.7068	**21.6090**	21.8987	1:26.9392	168.117 mph
3	11	(Brazil) Tony Kanaan	Andretti Green Racing	21.7845	21.7368	**21.7356**	21.8504	1:27.1073	167.793 mph
4	9	(New Zealand) Scott Dixon	Target Chip Ganassi Racing	21.8671	**21.8000**	21.8465	21.9610	1:27.4746	167.089 mph
5	5	(Brazil) Mario Moraes	KV Racing Technologies	21.9028	**21.8143**	21.9584	21.9551	1:27.6306	166.791 mph
6	27	(Japan) Hideki Mutoh	Andretti Green Racing	22.0494	**21.9353**	21.9793	22.0103	1:27.9743	167.139 mph
7	7	(United States) Danica Patrick	Andretti Green Racing	22.3295	22.1691	21.9981	**21.9948**	1:28.4915	166.168 mph
8	10	(United Kingdom) Dario Franchitti	Target Chip Ganassi Racing	22.6200	22.2715	21.9506	**21.8980**	1:28.7401	165.706 mph
9	2	(Brazil) Raphael Matos (R)	Luczo Dragon Racing	22.2420	**22.1679**	22.1693	22.1798	1:28.7590	165.671 mph
10	23	(South Africa) Tomas Scheckter	Dreyer & Reinbold Racing	**22.2038**	22.4601	22.3124	22.5221	1:29.4984	163.310 mph
11	24	(United Kingdom) Mike Conway (R)	Dreyer & Reinbold Racing	22.6558	**22.4316**	22.4583	22.5724	1:30.1181	162.187 mph
12	06	(Netherlands) Robert Doornbos (R)	Newman/Haas/Lanigan Racing	22.7480	22.5352	**22.5247**	22.6056	1:30.4135	161.657 mph
13	26	(United States) Marco Andretti	Andretti Green Racing	22.4908	22.6171	**22.6032**	22.7731	1:30.4842	161.531 mph
14	4	(United Kingdom) Dan Wheldon	Panther Racing	22.9546	22.6938	**22.4314**	22.4593	1:30.5391	161.433 mph
15	18	(United Kingdom) Justin Wilson	Dale Coyne Racing	22.8803	22.6073	**22.3855**	22.6781	1:30.5512	161.411 mph
16	14	(Canada) Paul Tracy	A. J. Foyt Enterprises	22.9360	22.7290	22.6500	**22.5814**	1:30.8964	160.798 mph
17	13	(Venezuela) E. J. Viso	HVM Racing	23.0394	22.6623	**22.5971**	22.6286	1:30.9274	160.744 mph
18	21	(United States) Ryan Hunter-Reay	Vision Racing	22.9088	22.6849	22.8597	**22.6794**	1:31.1328	160.381 mph
19	20	(United States) Ed Carpenter	Vision Racing	22.8512	**22.7570**	22.7921	22.9049	1:31.3052	160.079 mph
20	3	(Brazil) Hélio Castroneves	Penske Racing	No Time	No Time	No Time	No Time	No Time	Accident
WD	98	(United States) Stanton Barrett (R)	Team 3G	No Time	No Time	No Time	No Time	Withdrew	Practice Accident
OFFICIAL IRL REPORT

== Race ==
Pos	No.	Driver	Team	Laps	Time/Retired	Grid	Laps Led	Points
1	9	(New Zealand) Scott Dixon	Chip Ganassi Racing	225	1:38:43.9552	4	27	50
2	6	(Australia) Ryan Briscoe	Penske Racing	225	1:38:46.0809	1	154	43
3	10	(United Kingdom) Dario Franchitti	Chip Ganassi Racing	225	1:38:46.2196	8	19	35
4	02	(United States) Graham Rahal	Newman/Haas/Lanigan Racing	225	1:38:46.6296	2	0	32
5	7	(United States) Danica Patrick	Andretti Green Racing	225	1:38:49.9376	7	0	30
6	2	(Brazil) Raphael Matos (R)	Luczo-Dragon Racing	225	1:38:59.8429	9	0	28
7	26	(United States) Marco Andretti	Andretti Green Racing	225	1:39:01.9000	13	0	26
8	27	(Japan) Hideki Mutoh	Andretti Green Racing	224	+ 1 Lap	6	0	24
9	5	(Brazil) Mario Moraes	KV Racing Technology	224	+ 1 Lap	5	0	22
10	4	(United Kingdom) Dan Wheldon	Panther Racing	224	+ 1 Lap	14	0	20
11	3	(Brazil) Hélio Castroneves	Team Penske	222	+ 3 Laps	20	0	19
12	21	(United States) Ryan Hunter-Reay	Vision Racing	222	+ 3 Laps	18	0	18
13	23	(South Africa) Tomas Scheckter	Dreyer & Reinbold Racing	222	+ 3 Laps	10	0	17
14	06	(Netherlands) Robert Doornbos (R)	Newman/Haas/Lanigan Racing	220	+ 5 Laps	12	0	16
15	18	(United Kingdom) Justin Wilson	Dale Coyne Racing	219	+ 6 Laps	15	0	15
16	20	(United States) Ed Carpenter	Vision Racing	219	+ 6 Laps	19	0	14
17	14	(Canada) Paul Tracy	A. J. Foyt Enterprises	219	+ 6 Laps	16	0	13
18	13	(Venezuela) E. J. Viso	HVM Racing	175	Mechanical	17	0	12
19	11	(Brazil) Tony Kanaan	Andretti Green Racing	132	Mechanical	3	25	12
20	24	(United Kingdom) Mike Conway (R)	Dreyer & Reinbold Racing	55	Contact	11	0	12
21	98	(United States) Stanton Barrett (R)	Team 3G	0	DNS	NS	0	6
OFFICIAL IRL REPORT

== Standings after the race ==
Drivers' Championship standings

Pos	Driver	Points
1	(New Zealand) Scott Dixon	161
2	(Australia) Ryan Briscoe	157
	(United Kingdom) Dario Franchitti	157
4	(United States) Danica Patrick	139
5	(Brazil) Hélio Castroneves	136

- Note: Only the top five positions are included for the standings.

Previous race: 2009 Indianapolis 500	IndyCar Series; 2009 season	Next race: 2009 Bombardier Learjet 550
Previous race: 2008 ABC Supply Company A.J. Foyt 225	IndyCar Series at the Milwaukee Mile	Next race: 2011 Milwaukee 225
