= 2009 Honda Indy Toronto =

(Canada) 2009 Toronto
Race details
- 10th round of the 2009 IndyCar Series season
- Date: July 12, 2009
- Official name: Honda Indy Toronto
- Location: Streets of Toronto
- Course: Temporary street circuit 1.755 mi / 2.824 km
- Distance: 85 laps 149.175 mi / 240.074 km
- Weather: Partly cloudy with temperatures reaching up to 28.7 °C (83.7 °F)

Pole position
- Driver: (United Kingdom) Dario Franchitti (Chip Ganassi Racing)
- Time: 1:01.0249

Fastest lap
- Driver: (Australia) Ryan Briscoe (Team Penske)
- Time: 1:02.2313 (on lap 84 of 85)

Podium
- First: (United Kingdom) Dario Franchitti (Chip Ganassi Racing)
- Second: (Australia) Ryan Briscoe (Penske Racing)
- Third: (Australia) Will Power (Penske Racing)

The 2009 Honda Indy Toronto was the tenth round of the 2009 IndyCar Series season and took place on July 12, 2009 at the 1.755-mile (2.824 km) Exhibition Place temporary street circuit in Toronto, Ontario, Canada. Dario Franchitti won the race, to join Chip Ganassi Racing teammate Scott Dixon as the only three-time winners in the 2009 season. Franchitti also regained the points lead from Dixon, leading the championship by two points as the championship heads to Edmonton. Ryan Briscoe finished second for the fifth time in the last six races, with Penske Racing teammate Will Power third on his return to the series.

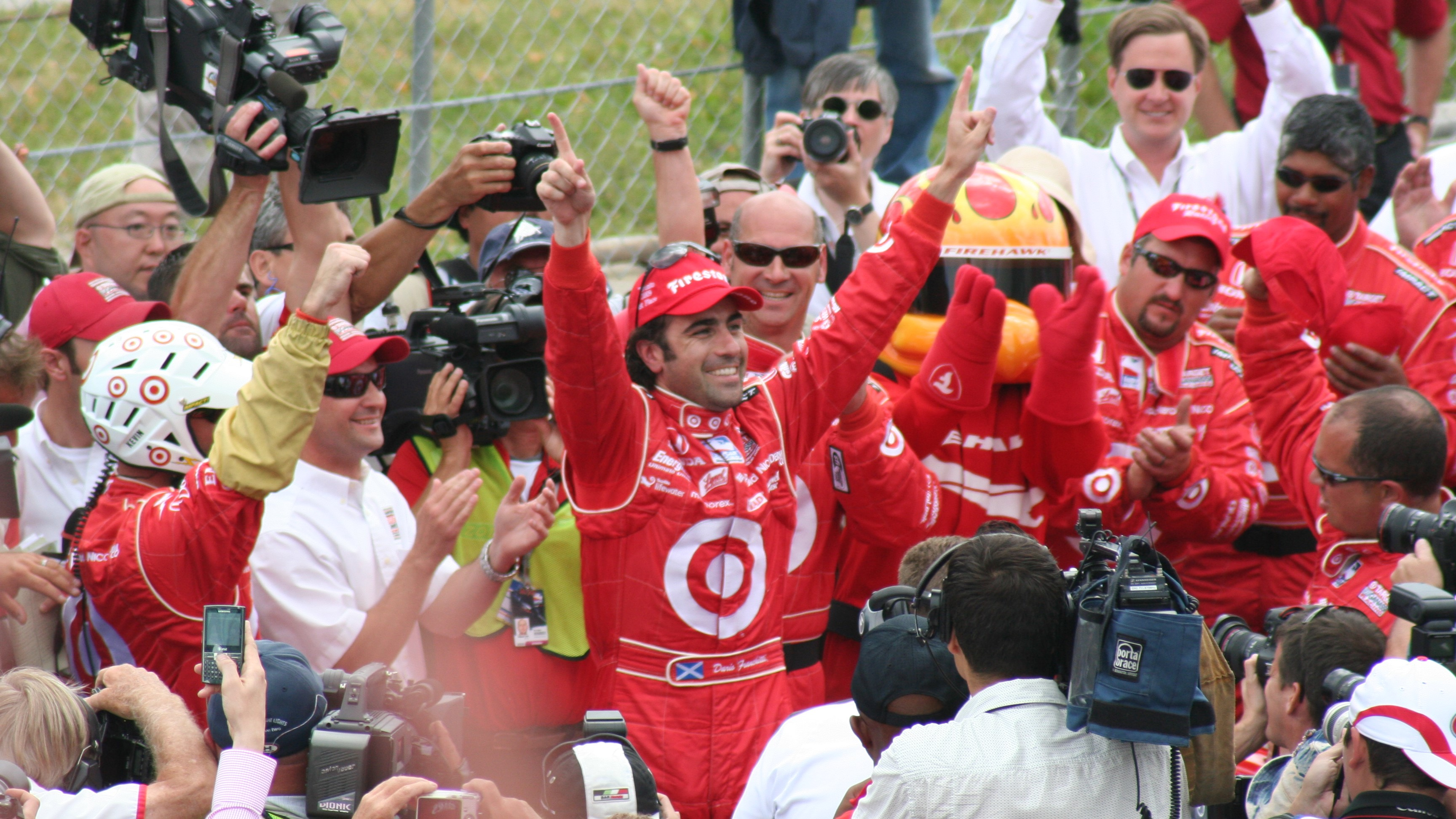
Dario Franchitti - Winner 2009 Honda Indy Toronto

The 2009 race was a resumption of the Toronto Grand Prix after a one-year hiatus due to the unification of the Champ Car World Series into IndyCar during the 2008 season, during which a Toronto Grand Prix was not held due to scheduling conflicts.

== Grid ==
Row	Inside		Outside	
1	10	(United Kingdom) Dario Franchitti	12	(Australia) Will Power
2	02	(United States) Graham Rahal	18	(United Kingdom) Justin Wilson
3	34	(Canada) Alex Tagliani	24	(United Kingdom) Mike Conway (R)
4	06	(Netherlands) Robert Doornbos (R)	9	(New Zealand) Scott Dixon
5	2	(Brazil) Raphael Matos (R)	3	(Brazil) Hélio Castroneves
6	6	(Australia) Ryan Briscoe	14	(United States) Ryan Hunter-Reay
7	5	(Brazil) Mario Moraes	23	(South Africa) Tomas Scheckter
8	15	(Canada) Paul Tracy	13	(Venezuela) E. J. Viso
9	26	(United States) Marco Andretti	7	(United States) Danica Patrick
10	20	(United States) Ed Carpenter	11	(Brazil) Tony Kanaan
11	4	(United Kingdom) Dan Wheldon	27	(Japan) Hideki Mutoh
12	98	(United States) Richard Antinucci (R)		

== Race ==
Pos	No.	Driver	Team	Laps	Time/Retired	Grid	Laps Led	Points
1	10	(United Kingdom) Dario Franchitti	Chip Ganassi Racing	85	1:43:47.1408	1	45	53
2	6	(Australia) Ryan Briscoe	Penske Racing	85	+ 1.6745	11	0	40
3	12	(Australia) Will Power	Penske Racing	85	+ 2.1355	2	0	35
4	9	(New Zealand) Scott Dixon	Chip Ganassi Racing	85	+ 2.4803	8	0	32
5	18	(United Kingdom) Justin Wilson	Dale Coyne Racing	85	+ 2.9230	4	0	30
6	7	(United States) Danica Patrick	Andretti Green Racing	85	+ 6.4095	18	0	28
7	14	(United States) Ryan Hunter-Reay	A. J. Foyt Enterprises	85	+ 7.1837	12	0	26
8	26	(United States) Marco Andretti	Andretti Green Racing	85	+ 8.2552	17	0	24
9	34	(Canada) Alex Tagliani	Conquest Racing	85	+ 13.4745	5	21	22
10	2	(Brazil) Raphael Matos (R)	Luczo-Dragon Racing	85	+ 16.0983	9	0	20
11	5	(Brazil) Mario Moraes	KV Racing Technology	85	+ 19.0141	13	1	19
12	27	(Japan) Hideki Mutoh	Andretti Green Racing	84	+ 1 Lap	22	0	18
13	13	(Venezuela) E. J. Viso	HVM Racing	84	+ 1 Lap	16	0	17
14	4	(United Kingdom) Dan Wheldon	Panther Racing	84	+ 1 Lap	21	0	16
15	20	(United States) Ed Carpenter	Vision Racing	82	+ 3 Laps	19	0	15
16	23	(South Africa) Tomas Scheckter	Dreyer & Reinbold Racing	74	Contact	14	6	14
17	11	(Brazil) Tony Kanaan	Andretti Green Racing	70	Contact	20	0	13
18	3	(Brazil) Hélio Castroneves	Penske Racing	65	Contact	10	12	12
19	15	(Canada) Paul Tracy	KV Racing Technology	65	Contact	15	0	12
20	02	(United States) Graham Rahal	Newman/Haas/Lanigan Racing	57	Contact	3	0	12
21	98	(United States) Richard Antinucci (R)	Team 3G	41	Mechanical	23	0	12
22	24	(United Kingdom) Mike Conway (R)	Dreyer & Reinbold Racing	32	Contact	6	0	12
23	06	(Netherlands) Robert Doornbos (R)	Newman/Haas/Lanigan Racing	26	Electrical	7	0	12
OFFICIAL IRL REPORT

== Standings after the race ==
Drivers' Championship standings

Pos	Driver	Points
1	(United Kingdom) Dario Franchitti	347
2	(New Zealand) Scott Dixon	345
3	(Australia) Ryan Briscoe	334
4	(Brazil) Hélio Castroneves	269
5	(United States) Danica Patrick	266

Previous race: 2009 Camping World Watkins Glen Grand Prix	IndyCar Series; 2009 season	Next race: 2009 Rexall Edmonton Indy
Previous race: 2007 Steelback Grand Prix (Champ Car World Series race)	2009 Honda Indy Toronto	Next race: 2010 Honda Indy Toronto
