= 2009 Iowa Corn Indy 250 =

(United States) 2009 Iowa
Race details
- 7th round of the 2009 IndyCar Series season
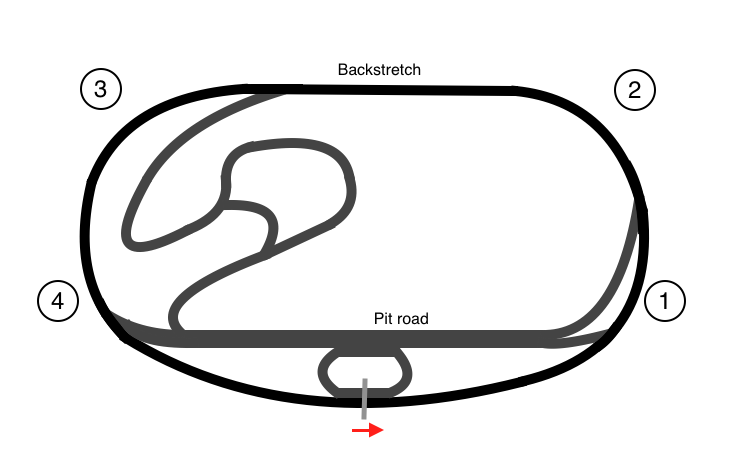
- Date: June 21, 2009
- Official name: Iowa Corn Indy 250
- Location: Iowa Speedway; Newton, Iowa, United States
- Course: Permanent racing facility 0.894 mi / 1.439 km
- Distance: 250 laps 223.500 mi / 359.688 km
- Weather: 75 °F (24 °C), overcast

Pole position
- Driver: (Brazil) Hélio Castroneves (Penske Racing)
- Time: set by owner points

Fastest lap
- Driver: (Japan) Hideki Mutoh (Andretti Green Racing)
- Time: 18.0128 (on lap 32 of 250)

Podium
- First: (United Kingdom) Dario Franchitti (Chip Ganassi Racing)
- Second: (Australia) Ryan Briscoe (Penske Racing)
- Third: (Japan) Hideki Mutoh (Andretti Green Racing)

The 2009 Iowa Corn Indy 250 was the seventh round of the 2009 IndyCar Series season. The race was held on June 21, 2009, at the 0.894-mile (1.439 km) Iowa Speedway in Newton, Iowa, United States. The race was broadcast on ABC. It received a 0.8 rating on the Nielsen ratings scale, down from a 1.1 rating from the 2008 Iowa Corn Indy 250.

== Race ==
Pos	No.	Driver	Team	Laps	Time/Retired	Grid	Laps Led	Points
1	10	(United Kingdom) Dario Franchitti	Chip Ganassi Racing	250	1:39:47.9077	4	68	50
2	6	(Australia) Ryan Briscoe	Penske Racing	250	+ 5.0132	2	85	42
3	27	(Japan) Hideki Mutoh	Andretti Green Racing	250	+ 10.9769	11	0	35
4	4	(United Kingdom) Dan Wheldon	Panther Racing	250	+ 17.5807	6	8	32
5	9	(New Zealand) Scott Dixon	Chip Ganassi Racing	249	+ 1 Lap	3	1	30
6	23	(South Africa) Tomas Scheckter	Dreyer & Reinbold Racing	249	+ 1 Lap	16	0	28
7	3	(Brazil) Hélio Castroneves	Penske Racing	249	+ 1 Lap	1	16	26
8	24	(United Kingdom) Mike Conway (R)	Dreyer & Reinbold Racing	249	+ 1 Lap	19	0	24
9	7	(United States) Danica Patrick	Andretti Green Racing	249	+ 1 Lap	5	24	22
10	20	(United States) Ed Carpenter	Vision Racing	248	+ 2 Laps	13	0	20
11	02	(United States) Graham Rahal	Newman/Haas/Lanigan Racing	245	+ 5 Laps	9	0	19
12	26	(United States) Marco Andretti	Andretti Green Racing	244	+ 6 Laps	8	0	18
13	98	(United States) Jaques Lazier	Team 3G	237	+ 13 Laps	20	0	17
14	11	(Brazil) Tony Kanaan	Andretti Green Racing	108	Contact	7	48	16
15	06	(Netherlands) Robert Doornbos (R)	Newman/Haas/Lanigan Racing	58	Handling	14	0	15
16	2	(Brazil) Raphael Matos (R)	Luczo-Dragon Racing	53	Contact	12	0	14
17	5	(Brazil) Mario Moraes	KV Racing Technology	52	Contact	15	0	13
18	18	(United Kingdom) Justin Wilson	Dale Coyne Racing	33	Contact	10	0	12
19	14	(United States) Ryan Hunter-Reay	A. J. Foyt Enterprises	2	Contact	17	0	12
20	13	(Venezuela) E. J. Viso	HVM Racing	0	Contact	18	0	12
OFFICIAL IRL REPORT

== Standings after the race ==
Drivers' Championship standings

Pos	Driver	Points
1	(Australia) Ryan Briscoe	241
2	(United Kingdom) Dario Franchitti	238
3	(New Zealand) Scott Dixon	226
4	(Brazil) Hélio Castroneves	212
5	(United States) Danica Patrick	189

- Note: Only the top five positions are included for the standings.

Previous race: 2009 Bombardier Learjet 550	IndyCar Series; 2009 season	Next race: 2009 SunTrust Indy Challenge
Previous race: 2008 Iowa Corn Indy 250	2009 Iowa Corn Indy 250	Next race: 2010 Iowa Corn Indy 250
