= 2009 Indy Japan 300 =

(Japan) 2009 Motegi
Race details
- 16th round of the 2009 IndyCar Series season
- Date: September 19, 2009
- Official name: Indy Japan 300
- Location: Twin Ring Motegi
- Course: Permanent racing facility 1.520 mi / 2.446 km
- Distance: 200 laps 304.000 mi / 489.241 km

Pole position
- Driver: (New Zealand) Scott Dixon (Chip Ganassi Racing)
- Time: 1:48.3400 (4 laps)

Fastest lap
- Driver: (New Zealand) Scott Dixon (Chip Ganassi Racing)
- Time: 27.6698 (on lap 174 of 200)

Podium
- First: (New Zealand) Scott Dixon (Chip Ganassi Racing)
- Second: (United Kingdom) Dario Franchitti (Chip Ganassi Racing)
- Third: (United States) Graham Rahal (Newman/Haas/Lanigan)

The 2009 Indy Japan 300 was the sixteenth round of the 2009 IndyCar Series season, and was held on September 19, 2009 at the 1.520-mile (2.446 km) Twin Ring Motegi, in Motegi, Japan.

== Grid ==
Row	Inside		Outside	
1	9	(New Zealand) Scott Dixon	5	(Brazil) Mario Moraes
2	10	(United Kingdom) Dario Franchitti	6	(Australia) Ryan Briscoe
3	02	(United States) Graham Rahal	7	(United States) Danica Patrick
4	06	(Spain) Oriol Servià	4	(United Kingdom) Dan Wheldon
5	18	(United Kingdom) Justin Wilson	23	(South Africa) Tomas Scheckter
6	20	(United States) Ed Carpenter	2	(Brazil) Raphael Matos (R)
7	24	(United Kingdom) Mike Conway (R)	26	(United States) Marco Andretti
8	14	(United States) Ryan Hunter-Reay	34	(Japan) Kosuke Matsuura
9	43	(United States) Roger Yasukawa	13	(Venezuela) E. J. Viso
10	33	(Netherlands) Robert Doornbos (R)	98	(United States) Stanton Barrett (R)
11	3	(Brazil) Hélio Castroneves	27	(Japan) Hideki Mutoh
12	11	(Brazil) Tony Kanaan**		

- ** Note: Kanaan originally qualified 14th, but failed post-qualifying inspection. As a result, Kanaan was forced to start from the rear of the field.

== Race ==
Pos	No.	Driver	Team	Laps	Time/Retired	Grid	Laps Led	Points
1	9	(New Zealand) Scott Dixon	Chip Ganassi Racing	200	1:51:37.6411	1	139	53
2	10	(United Kingdom) Dario Franchitti	Chip Ganassi Racing	200	+ 1.4475	3	53	40
3	02	(United States) Graham Rahal	Newman/Haas/Lanigan Racing	200	+ 3.2002	5	3	35
4	06	(Spain) Oriol Servià	Newman/Haas/Lanigan Racing	200	+ 7.3720	7	0	32
5	5	(Brazil) Mario Moraes	KV Racing Technology	200	+ 12.7643	2	0	30
6	7	(United States) Danica Patrick	Andretti Green Racing	200	+ 16.1392	6	0	28
7	26	(United States) Marco Andretti	Andretti Green Racing	200	+ 16.6513	14	0	26
8	4	(United Kingdom) Dan Wheldon	Panther Racing	200	+ 17.2646	8	0	24
9	2	(Brazil) Raphael Matos (R)	Luczo-Dragon Racing	200	+ 17.5790	12	0	22
10	3	(Brazil) Hélio Castroneves	Penske Racing	199	+ 1 Lap	21	0	20
11	11	(Brazil) Tony Kanaan	Andretti Green Racing	199	+ 1 Lap	23	0	19
12	18	(United Kingdom) Justin Wilson	Dale Coyne Racing	199	+ 1 Lap	9	0	18
13	20	(United States) Ed Carpenter	Vision Racing	198	+ 2 Laps	11	0	17
14	27	(Japan) Hideki Mutoh	Andretti Green Racing	198	+ 2 Laps	22	0	16
15	13	(Venezuela) E. J. Viso	HVM Racing	198	+ 2 Laps	18	0	15
16	33	(Netherlands) Robert Doornbos (R)	HVM Racing	198	+ 2 Laps	19	0	14
17	34	(Japan) Kosuke Matsuura	Conquest Racing	195	+ 5 Laps	16	0	13
18	6	(Australia) Ryan Briscoe	Penske Racing	185	+ 15 Laps	4	5	12
19	98	(United States) Stanton Barrett (R)	Team 3G	182	+ 18 Laps	20	0	12
20	43	(United States) Roger Yasukawa	Dreyer & Reinbold Racing	172	+ 28 Laps	17	0	12
21	14	(United States) Ryan Hunter-Reay	A. J. Foyt Enterprises	157	Contact	15	0	12
22	24	(United Kingdom) Mike Conway (R)	Dreyer & Reinbold Racing	103	Contact	13	0	12
23	23	(South Africa) Tomas Scheckter	Dreyer & Reinbold Racing	83	Mechanical	10	0	12
OFFICIAL IRL REPORT

== Standings after the race ==
Drivers' Championship standings

Pos	Driver	Points
1	(New Zealand) Scott Dixon	570
2	(United Kingdom) Dario Franchitti	565
3	(Australia) Ryan Briscoe	562
4	(Brazil) Hélio Castroneves	403
5	(United States) Danica Patrick	381

Previous race: 2009 Peak Antifreeze & Motor Oil Indy 300	IndyCar Series; 2009 season	Next race: 2009 Firestone Indy 300
Previous race: 2008 Indy Japan 300	Indy Japan 300	Next race: 2010 Indy Japan 300
