= 2009 Rexall Edmonton Indy =

(Canada) 2009 Edmonton
Race details
- 11th round of the 2009 IndyCar Series season
- Date: July 26, 2009
- Official name: Rexall Edmonton Indy
- Location: Rexall Speedway, Edmonton, Alberta, Canada
- Course: Temporary Airport Course; 1.973 mi / 3.175 km
- Distance: 95 laps 179.543 mi / 288.925 km
- Weather: Mainly sunny with temperatures reaching up to 30.7 °C (87.3 °F)

Pole position
- Driver: (Australia) Will Power (Penske Racing)
- Time: 1:01.0133

Fastest lap
- Driver: (United Kingdom) Mike Conway (Dreyer & Reinbold)
- Time: 1:02.4340 (on lap 39 of 95)

Podium
- First: (Australia) Will Power (Penske Racing)
- Second: (Brazil) Hélio Castroneves (Penske Racing)
- Third: (New Zealand) Scott Dixon (Chip Ganassi Racing)

The 2009 Rexall Edmonton Indy was the eleventh round of the 2009 IndyCar Series season, and was held on July 26, 2009 at the 1.973-mile (3.175 km) Rexall Speedway in Edmonton, Alberta, Canada.

== Qualifying results ==
- All cars are split into two groups; one of eleven and one of twelve, with the fastest six from each group going through to the "Top 12" session. In this session, the fastest six runners will progress to the "Firestone Fast Six". The fastest driver in this final session will claim pole, with the rest of the runners lining up in session order, regardless of qualifying times. (Fast Six from 1-6, Top 12 from 7-12 and Round 1 from 13-23) Drivers can use as many laps as they want in the timed sessions.

Pos	Nat	Name	Team	Group 1	Group 2	Top 12	Fast Six
1	(Australia)	Will Power	Penske Racing		1:01.4992	1:01.2063	1:01.0133
2	(Australia)	Ryan Briscoe	Penske Racing		1:01.5795	1:01.0667	1:01.1232
3	(Brazil)	Hélio Castroneves	Penske Racing		1:01.2372	1:01.2731	1:01.2033
4	(New Zealand)	Scott Dixon	Chip Ganassi Racing	1:01.7204		1:01.3809	1:01.2046
5	(United States)	Graham Rahal	Newman/Haas/Lanigan Racing	1:01.7521		1:01.5114	1:01.6952
6	(United Kingdom)	Dario Franchitti	Chip Ganassi Racing		1:01.7534	1:01.4302	1:01.8344
7	(Brazil)	Mario Moraes	KV Racing Technology		1:01.4862	1:01.5337	
8	(Brazil)	Raphael Matos (R)	Luczo-Dragon Racing	1:01.8379		1:01.5685	
9	(Canada)	Paul Tracy	KV Racing Technology	1:01.5093		1:01.6768	
10	(Netherlands)	Robert Doornbos (R)	Newman/Haas/Lanigan Racing	1:01.6582		1:01.6844	
11	(United Kingdom)	Mike Conway (R)	Dreyer & Reinbold Racing	1:01.7366		1:01.9064	
12	(Japan)	Hideki Mutoh	Andretti Green Racing		1:02.2305	1:02.1678	
13	(Brazil)	Tony Kanaan	Andretti Green Racing	1:02.2723			
14	(Venezuela)	E. J. Viso	HVM Racing		1:02.4240		
15	(United Kingdom)	Justin Wilson	Dale Coyne Racing	1:02.4009			
16	(South Africa)	Tomas Scheckter	Dreyer & Reinbold Racing		1:02.4280		
17	(Canada)	Alex Tagliani	Conquest Racing	1:02.6459			
18	(United States)	Marco Andretti	Andretti Green Racing		1:02.5059		
19	(United States)	Richard Antinucci (R)	Team 3G	1:02.8364			
20	(United States)	Danica Patrick	Andretti Green Racing		1:02.5184		
21	(United States)	Ryan Hunter-Reay	A. J. Foyt Enterprises	1:02.9996			
22	(United Kingdom)	Dan Wheldon	Panther Racing		1:02.8369		
23	(United States)	Ed Carpenter	Vision Racing		1:03.4342		

== Grid ==
Row	Inside		Outside	
1	12	(Australia) Will Power	6	(Australia) Ryan Briscoe
2	3	(Brazil) Hélio Castroneves	9	(New Zealand) Scott Dixon
3	02	(United States) Graham Rahal	10	(United Kingdom) Dario Franchitti
4	5	(Brazil) Mario Moraes	2	(Brazil) Raphael Matos (R)
5	15	(Canada) Paul Tracy	06	(Netherlands) Robert Doornbos (R)
6	24	(United Kingdom) Mike Conway (R)	27	(Japan) Hideki Mutoh
7	11	(Brazil) Tony Kanaan	13	(Venezuela) E. J. Viso
8	18	(United Kingdom) Justin Wilson	23	(South Africa) Tomas Scheckter
9	34	(Canada) Alex Tagliani	26	(United States) Marco Andretti
10	98	(United States) Richard Antinucci (R)	7	(United States) Danica Patrick
11	14	(United States) Ryan Hunter-Reay	4	(United Kingdom) Dan Wheldon
12	20	(United States) Ed Carpenter		

== Race ==
Pos	No.	Driver	Team	Laps	Time/Retired	Grid	Laps Led	Points
1	12	(Australia) Will Power	Penske Racing	95	1:42:42.3773	1	90	53
2	3	(Brazil) Hélio Castroneves	Penske Racing	95	+ 1.0936*	3	2	40
3	9	(New Zealand) Scott Dixon	Chip Ganassi Racing	95	+ 1.3213	4	2	35
4	6	(Australia) Ryan Briscoe	Penske Racing	95	+ 1.8266	2	1	32
5	10	(United Kingdom) Dario Franchitti	Chip Ganassi Racing	95	+ 4.4652	6	0	30
6	15	(Canada) Paul Tracy	KV Racing Technology	95	+ 6.3941	9	0	28
7	02	(United States) Graham Rahal	Newman/Haas/Lanigan Racing	95	+ 26.5700	5	0	26
8	18	(United Kingdom) Justin Wilson	Dale Coyne Racing	95	+ 26.9169	15	0	24
9	06	(Netherlands) Robert Doornbos (R)	Newman/Haas/Lanigan Racing	94	+ 1 Lap	10	0	22
10	26	(United States) Marco Andretti	Andretti Green Racing	94	+ 1 Lap	18	0	20
11	7	(United States) Danica Patrick	Andretti Green Racing	94	+ 1 Lap	20	0	19
12	13	(Venezuela) E. J. Viso	HVM Racing	94	+ 1 Lap	14	0	18
13	34	(Canada) Alex Tagliani	Conquest Racing	94	+ 1 Lap	17	0	17
14	27	(Japan) Hideki Mutoh	Andretti Green Racing	94	+ 1 Lap	12	0	16
15	4	(United Kingdom) Dan Wheldon	Panther Racing	94	+ 1 Lap	22	0	15
16	20	(United States) Ed Carpenter	Vision Racing	93	+ 2 Laps	23	0	14
17	14	(United States) Ryan Hunter-Reay	A. J. Foyt Enterprises	87	+ 8 Laps	21	0	13
18	2	(Brazil) Raphael Matos (R)	Luczo-Dragon Racing	85	+ 10 Laps	8	0	12
19	23	(South Africa) Tomas Scheckter	Dreyer & Reinbold Racing	73	Contact	16	0	12
20	24	(United Kingdom) Mike Conway (R)	Dreyer & Reinbold Racing	63	+ 32 Laps	11	0	12
21	11	(Brazil) Tony Kanaan	Andretti Green Racing	34	Pit Fire	13	0	12
22	98	(United States) Richard Antinucci (R)	Team 3G	20	Mechanical	19	0	12
23	5	(Brazil) Mario Moraes	KV Racing Technology	0	Contact	7	0	12
OFFICIAL IRL REPORT

- * Race finished under caution.

== Standings after the race ==
Drivers' Championship standings

Pos	Driver	Points
1	(New Zealand) Scott Dixon	380
2	(United Kingdom) Dario Franchitti	377
3	(Australia) Ryan Briscoe	366
4	(Brazil) Hélio Castroneves	309
5	(United States) Danica Patrick	285

Previous race: 2009 Honda Indy Toronto	IndyCar Series; 2009 season	Next race: 2009 Meijer Indy 300
Previous race: 2008 Rexall Edmonton Indy	2009 Rexall Edmonton Indy	Next race: 2010 Honda Indy Edmonton
