= 2009 Bombardier Learjet 550 =

(United States) 2009 Texas
Race details
- 6th round of the 2009 IndyCar Series season
- Date: June 6, 2009
- Official name: Bombardier Learjet 550
- Location: Texas Motor Speedway
- Course: Permanent racing facility 1.455 mi / 2.342 km
- Distance: 228 laps 331.740 mi / 533.884 km
- Weather: 89 °F (32 °C), fair

Pole position
- Driver: (United Kingdom) Dario Franchitti (Chip Ganassi Racing)
- Time: 1:37.6725 (4-lap)

Fastest lap
- Driver: (Australia) Ryan Briscoe (Penske Racing)
- Time: 24.4870 (on lap 60 of 228)

Podium
- First: (Brazil) Hélio Castroneves (Penske Racing)
- Second: (Australia) Ryan Briscoe (Penske Racing)
- Third: (New Zealand) Scott Dixon (Chip Ganassi Racing)

The 2009 Bombardier Learjet 550 was the sixth round of the 2009 IndyCar Series season, held on June 6, 2009 at the 1.455-mile (2.342 km) Texas Motor Speedway, in Fort Worth, Texas. The race was won by Penske Racing driver Hélio Castroneves, his third victory at Texas.

== Race ==
Pos	No.	Driver	Team	Laps	Time/Retired	Grid	Laps Led	Points
1	3	(Brazil) Hélio Castroneves	Penske Racing	228	1:55:16.1670	4	57	50
2	6	(Australia) Ryan Briscoe	Penske Racing	228	+0.3904	2	160	42
3	9	(New Zealand) Scott Dixon	Chip Ganassi Racing	228	+2.2461	3	0	35
4	26	(United States) Marco Andretti	Andretti Green Racing	228	+4.3745	8	0	32
5	10	(United Kingdom) Dario Franchitti	Chip Ganassi Racing	228	+4.7695	1	10	31
6	7	(United States) Danica Patrick	Andretti Green Racing	228	+5.2980	5	0	28
7	4	(United Kingdom) Dan Wheldon	Panther Racing	228	+7.6203	7	0	26
8	11	(Brazil) Tony Kanaan	Andretti Green Racing	228	+8.5009	16	0	24
9	20	(United States) Ed Carpenter	Vision Racing	228	+18.7088	10	1	22
10	5	(Brazil) Mario Moraes	KV Racing Technology	227	+ 1 Lap	6	0	20
11	06	(Netherlands) Robert Doornbos (R)	Newman/Haas/Lanigan Racing	227	+ 1 Lap	9	0	19
12	2	(Brazil) Raphael Matos (R)	Luczo-Dragon Racing	226	+ 2 Laps	15	0	18
13	43	(South Africa) Tomas Scheckter	Dreyer & Reinbold Racing	226	+ 2 Laps	18	0	17
14	34	(Canada) Alex Tagliani	Conquest Racing	225	+ 3 Laps	13	0	16
15	18	(United Kingdom) Justin Wilson	Dale Coyne Racing	225	+ 3 Laps	17	0	15
16	21	(United States) Ryan Hunter-Reay	Vision Racing	225	+ 3 Laps	23	0	14
17	67	(United States) Sarah Fisher	Sarah Fisher Racing	222	+ 6 Laps	14	0	13
18	98	(United States) Jaques Lazier	Team 3G	210	+ 18 Laps	24	0	12
19	24	(United Kingdom) Mike Conway (R)	Dreyer & Reinbold Racing	185	+ 43 Laps	19	0	12
20	14	(United States) A. J. Foyt IV	A. J. Foyt Enterprises	170	Contact	22	0	12
21	27	(Japan) Hideki Mutoh	Andretti Green Racing	153	Electrical	11	0	12
22	02	(United States) Graham Rahal	Newman/Haas/Lanigan Racing	1	Contact	12	0	12
23	23	(Venezuela) Milka Duno	Dreyer & Reinbold Racing	1	Contact	20	0	12
24	13	(Venezuela) E. J. Viso	HVM Racing	1	Contact	21	0	12
OFFICIAL IRL REPORT

== Standings after the race ==
Drivers' Championship standings

Pos	Driver	Points
1	(Australia) Ryan Briscoe	199
2	(New Zealand) Scott Dixon	196
3	(United Kingdom) Dario Franchitti	188
4	(Brazil) Hélio Castroneves	186
5	(United States) Danica Patrick	167

- Note: Only the top five positions are included for the standings.

Previous race: 2009 ABC Supply Company A.J. Foyt 225	IndyCar Series; 2009 season	Next race: 2009 Iowa Corn Indy 250
Previous race: 2008 Bombardier Learjet 550	2009 Bombardier Learjet 550	Next race: 2010 Firestone 550
