= 2009 Firestone Indy 300 =

(United States) 2009 Homestead-Miami Speedway
Race details
- 17th round of the 2009 IndyCar Series season
- Date: October 10, 2009
- Official name: Firestone Indy 300
- Location: Homestead-Miami Speedway
- Course: Permanent racing facility 1.485 mi / 2.390 km
- Distance: 200 laps 297.000 mi / 477.975 km
- Weather: 89 °F (32 °C), fair

Pole position
- Driver: (United Kingdom) Dario Franchitti (Chip Ganassi Racing)
- Time: 1:40.5378 (4 laps), 212.696 mph (342.301 km/h)

Fastest lap
- Driver: (New Zealand) Scott Dixon (Chip Ganassi Racing)
- Time: 25.4483 (on lap 105 of 200)

Podium
- First: (United Kingdom) Dario Franchitti (Chip Ganassi Racing)
- Second: (Australia) Ryan Briscoe (Penske Racing)
- Third: (New Zealand) Scott Dixon (Chip Ganassi Racing)

The 2009 Firestone Indy 300 was the final showdown of the 2009 IndyCar season. This 297-mile (478 km) race took place on October 10, at the 1.485-mile (2.390 km) Homestead-Miami Speedway in Homestead, Florida near Miami. The race was telecast by Versus. Scotland's Dario Franchitti benefitted from late pit-stops for rivals Scott Dixon and Ryan Briscoe to take his second IndyCar Series title by ten points. This race is also the fastest 300 mile oval race in IndyCar history owing to no caution flags.

== Grid ==
Row	Inside		Outside	
1	10	(United Kingdom) Dario Franchitti	9	(New Zealand) Scott Dixon
2	6	(Australia) Ryan Briscoe	20	(United States) Ed Carpenter
3	40202	(United Kingdom) Alex Lloyd	02	(United States) Graham Rahal
4	7	(United States) Danica Patrick	26	(United States) Marco Andretti
5	2	(Brazil) Raphael Matos	5	(Brazil) Mario Moraes
6	3	(Brazil) Hélio Castroneves	43	(South Africa) Tomas Scheckter
7	18	(United Kingdom) Justin Wilson	4	(United Kingdom) Dan Wheldon
8	11	(Brazil) Tony Kanaan	67	(United States) Sarah Fisher
9	23	(Venezuela) Milka Duno	13	(Venezuela) E. J. Viso
10	27	(Japan) Hideki Mutoh	24	(United Kingdom) Mike Conway
11	14	(United States) Ryan Hunter-Reay	33	(Netherlands) Robert Doornbos
12	98	(United States) Jaques Lazier		

== Race ==
All cars utilized Dallara chassis, Honda engines, and Firestone Firehawk tires

Pos.	No.	Driver	Team	Laps	Time/Retired	Grid	Laps Led	Points
1	10	(United Kingdom) Dario Franchitti	Chip Ganassi Racing	200	1:28:28.3117 (201.42 mph (324.15 km/h))	1	25	51
2	6	(Australia) Ryan Briscoe	Penske Racing	200	+ 4.7888	3	103	42
3	9	(New Zealand) Scott Dixon	Chip Ganassi Racing	200	+ 6.0206	2	70	35
4	11	(Brazil) Tony Kanaan	Andretti Green Racing	199	+ 1 Lap	15	0	32
5	3	(Brazil) Hélio Castroneves	Penske Racing	199	+ 1 Lap	11	2	30
6	27	(Japan) Hideki Mutoh	Andretti Green Racing	198	+ 2 Laps	19	0	28
7	5	(Brazil) Mario Moraes	KV Racing Technology	198	+ 2 Laps	10	0	26
8	40202	(United Kingdom) Alex Lloyd (R)	Newman/Haas/Lanigan Racing	198	+ 2 Laps	5	0	24
9	43	(South Africa) Tomas Scheckter	Dreyer & Reinbold Racing	197	+ 3 Laps	12	0	22
10	18	(United Kingdom) Justin Wilson	Dale Coyne Racing	197	+ 3 Laps	13	0	20
11	02	(United States) Graham Rahal	Newman/Haas/Lanigan Racing	197	+ 3 Laps	6	0	19
12	20	(United States) Ed Carpenter	Vision Racing	197	+ 3 Laps	4	0	18
13	14	(United States) Ryan Hunter-Reay	A. J. Foyt Enterprises	196	+ 4 Laps	21	0	17
14	2	(Brazil) Raphael Matos (R)	Luczo-Dragon Racing	196	+ 4 Laps	9	0	16
15	24	(United Kingdom) Mike Conway (R)	Dreyer & Reinbold Racing	195	+ 5 Laps	20	0	15
16	13	(Venezuela) E. J. Viso	HVM Racing	194	+ 6 Laps	18	0	14
17	23	(Venezuela) Milka Duno	Dreyer & Reinbold Racing	194	+ 6 Laps	17	0	13
18	67	(United States) Sarah Fisher	Sarah Fisher Racing	187	+ 13 Laps	16	0	12
19	7	(United States) Danica Patrick	Andretti Green Racing	185	+ 15 Laps	7	0	12
20	33	(Netherlands) Robert Doornbos (R)	HVM Racing	166	Lost mirror	22	0	12
21	4	(United Kingdom) Dan Wheldon	Panther Racing	150	Pit lane crash	14	0	12
22	26	(United States) Marco Andretti	Andretti Green Racing	58	Brakes	8	0	12
23	98	(United States) Jaques Lazier	Team 3G	23	Fuel Pressure	23	0	12
OFFICIAL IRL REPORT

Caution flags: none

Previous race: 2009 Indy Japan 300	IndyCar Series; 2009 season	Next race: none
Previous race: 2008 GAINSCO Auto Insurance Indy 300	Firestone Indy 300	Next race: 2010 Cafés do Brasil Indy 300
