= 2009 SunTrust Indy Challenge =

(United States) 2009 Richmond
Race details
- 8th round of the 2009 IndyCar Series season
- Date: June 27, 2009
- Official name: SunTrust Indy Challenge
- Location: Richmond International Raceway
- Course: Permanent racing facility 0.750 mi / 1.207 km
- Distance: 300 laps 225.000 mi / 362.102 km
- Weather: 76 °F (24 °C), partly cloudy

Pole position
- Driver: (United Kingdom) Dario Franchitti (Chip Ganassi Racing)
- Time: 1:04.5488 (4 laps)

Fastest lap
- Driver: (New Zealand) Scott Dixon (Chip Ganassi Racing)
- Time: 16.6070 (on lap 263 of 300)

Podium
- First: (New Zealand) Scott Dixon (Chip Ganassi Racing)
- Second: (United Kingdom) Dario Franchitti (Chip Ganassi Racing)
- Third: (United States) Graham Rahal (N/H/L Racing)

The 2009 SunTrust Indy Challenge was the eighth round of the 2009 IndyCar Series season and took place on June 27, 2009 at the 0.750-mile (1.207 km) Richmond International Raceway, in Henrico County, Virginia. Scott Dixon of Chip Ganassi Racing won the race, the 19th of his career and tied him with Sam Hornish Jr. with the record of the most IndyCar Series victories.

== Race ==
Pos	No.	Driver	Team	Laps	Time/Retired	Grid	Laps Led	Points
1	9	(New Zealand) Scott Dixon	Chip Ganassi Racing	300	1:48:02.4703	2	161	52
2	10	(United Kingdom) Dario Franchitti	Chip Ganassi Racing	300	+ 0.3109	1	65	41
3	02	(United States) Graham Rahal	Newman/Haas/Lanigan Racing	300	+ 2.4085	5	0	35
4	27	(Japan) Hideki Mutoh	Andretti Green Racing	300	+ 13.5302	8	74	32
5	7	(United States) Danica Patrick	Andretti Green Racing	300	+ 14.1111	10	0	30
6	11	(Brazil) Tony Kanaan	Andretti Green Racing	299	+ 1 Lap	17	0	28
7	26	(United States) Marco Andretti	Andretti Green Racing	299	+ 1 Lap	16	0	26
8	2	(Brazil) Raphael Matos (R)	Luczo-Dragon Racing	299	+ 1 Lap	6	0	24
9	06	(Netherlands) Robert Doornbos (R)	Newman/Haas/Lanigan Racing	299	+ 1 Lap	12	0	22
10	4	(United Kingdom) Dan Wheldon	Panther Racing	299	+ 1 Lap	13	0	20
11	23	(South Africa) Tomas Scheckter	Dreyer & Reinbold Racing	299	+ 1 Lap	9	0	19
12	13	(Venezuela) E. J. Viso	HVM Racing	299	+ 1 Lap	7	0	18
13	20	(United States) Ed Carpenter	Vision Racing	299	+ 1 Lap	14	0	17
14	18	(United Kingdom) Justin Wilson	Dale Coyne Racing	298	+ 2 Laps	15	0	16
15	14	(United States) Ryan Hunter-Reay	A. J. Foyt Enterprises	298	+ 2 Laps	18	0	15
16	5	(Brazil) Mario Moraes	KV Racing Technology	297	+ 3 Laps	19	0	14
17	3	(Brazil) Hélio Castroneves	Penske Racing	245	Contact	3	0	13
18	24	(United Kingdom) Mike Conway (R)	Dreyer & Reinbold Racing	135	Contact	11	0	12
19	6	(Australia) Ryan Briscoe	Penske Racing	26	Contact	4	0	12
20	98	(United States) Jaques Lazier	Team 3G	0	Contact	20	0	12
OFFICIAL IRL REPORT

=== Cautions ===
From Lap	To Lap	Number of laps	Reason
1	7	7	Jaques Lazier accident turn 2
27	37	11	Ryan Briscoe accident turn 2
138	153	16	Mike Conway accident turn 4
248	260	13	Hélio Castroneves accident turn 2

== Standings after the race ==
Drivers' Championship standings

Pos	Driver	Points
1	(United Kingdom) Dario Franchitti	279
2	(New Zealand) Scott Dixon	278
3	(Australia) Ryan Briscoe	253
4	(Brazil) Hélio Castroneves	225
5	(United States) Danica Patrick	219

- Note: Only the top five positions are included for the standings.

Previous race:
2009 Iowa Corn Indy 250
Previous race:
2008 SunTrust Indy Challenge
IndyCar Series
2009 season
2009 SunTrust Indy Challenge
Next race:
2009 Camping World Grand Prix at the Glen
Next race:
2020 Indy Richmond 300

(Cancelled Due to COVID-19)
