= Greg Beck =

Australian rules footballer

Personal information
- Full name: Greg Beck
- Born: 11 April 1956 (age 70)
- Original team: Parade CBC
- Height: 170 cm (5 ft 7 in)
- Weight: 66 kg (146 lb)

Playing career^{1}
Years	Club	Games (Goals)
1973, 1975	Collingwood	8 (5)
- ^{1} Playing statistics correct to the end of 1975.

Greg Beck (born 11 April 1956) is a former Australian rules footballer who played with Collingwood in the Victorian Football League (VFL).
