= 2008 Gainsco Auto Insurance Indy 300 =

(United States) 2008 Homestead-Miami Speedway
Race details
- Race 1 of 17 in the 2008 IndyCar Series season
- Date: March 29, 2008
- Official name: GAINSCO Auto Insurance Indy 300
- Location: Homestead-Miami Speedway
- Course: Permanent racing facility 1.485 mi / 2.390 km
- Distance: 200 laps 297.000 mi / 477.975 km
- Weather: 78 °F (26 °C), Fair skies

Pole position
- Driver: (New Zealand) Scott Dixon ( (United States) Chip Ganassi Racing)
- Time: 1:40.2341 (4 laps)

Fastest lap
- Driver: (Australia) Ryan Briscoe ( (United States) Penske Racing)
- Time: 25.0624 (on lap 3 of 200)

Podium
- First: (New Zealand) Scott Dixon ( (United States) Chip Ganassi Racing)
- Second: (United States) Marco Andretti ( (United States) Andretti Green Racing)
- Third: (United Kingdom) Dan Wheldon ( (United States) Chip Ganassi Racing)

The 2008 GAINSCO Auto Insurance Indy 300 was the opening round of the 2008 IndyCar Series season and took place on March 29, 2008 at the 1.485-mile (2.390 km) Homestead-Miami Speedway. For the first time in series history, the reigning champion was not on the grid to defend his title, as Dario Franchitti had moved to the No. 40 NASCAR Sprint Cup Series car for Chip Ganassi Racing. Graham Rahal was supposed to make his debut in this race, however due to a crash in testing his team could not get his car repaired in time for the race. 2003 champion Scott Dixon kicked off the season with the victory, on his way to the series championship.

== Qualifying ==
- All cars run four laps and the car which completes the laps in the quickest time, wins the pole.

Pos	No.	Driver	Team	Time	Speed (mph)
1	9	(New Zealand) Scott Dixon	Chip Ganassi Racing	1:40.2341	213.341
2	7	(United States) Danica Patrick	Andretti Green Racing	1:40.8066	212.129
3	6	(Australia) Ryan Briscoe	Penske Racing	1:40.8166	212.108
4	26	(United States) Marco Andretti	Andretti Green Racing	1:40.9452	211.838
5	3	(Brazil) Hélio Castroneves	Penske Racing	1:41.0675	211.581
6	11	(Brazil) Tony Kanaan	Andretti Green Racing	1:41.0683	211.580
7	27	(Japan) Hideki Mutoh (R)	Andretti Green Racing	1:41.1024	211.508
8	25	(Canada) Marty Roth	Roth Racing	1:41.1264	211.458
9	17	(United States) Ryan Hunter-Reay	Rahal Letterman Racing	1:41.4689	210.744
10	4	(Brazil) Vítor Meira	Panther Racing	1:41.6762	210.315
11	15	(United States) Buddy Rice	Dreyer & Reinbold Racing	1:42.0784	209.486
12	14	(United Kingdom) Darren Manning	A. J. Foyt Enterprises	1:42.1598	209.319
13	34	(France) Franck Perera (R)	Conquest Racing	1:42.2034	209.230
14	5	(Spain) Oriol Servià (R)	KV Racing	1:42.3056	209.021
15	02	(United Kingdom) Justin Wilson (R)	Newman/Haas/Lanigan Racing	1:42.4349	208.757
16	23	(Venezuela) Milka Duno	Dreyer & Reinbold Racing	1:42.6559	208.308
17	36	(Brazil) Enrique Bernoldi (R)	Conquest Racing	1:42.7433	208.130
18	33	(Venezuela) E. J. Viso (R)	HVM Racing	1:42.7577	208.101
19	8	(Australia) Will Power (R)	KV Racing	1:42.7935	208.029
20	18	(Brazil) Bruno Junqueira	Dale Coyne Racing	1:43.0882	207.434
21	19	(Brazil) Mario Moraes (R)	Dale Coyne Racing	1:43.2707	207.067
22	10	(United Kingdom) Dan Wheldon	Chip Ganassi Racing	No time	
23	24	(United Kingdom) Jay Howard (R)	Roth Racing	No time	
24	20	(United States) Ed Carpenter	Vision Racing	1:40.2482	213.311
25	2	(United States) A. J. Foyt IV	Vision Racing	1:40.7676	212.211

- The Vision Racing entries of Ed Carpenter and A. J. Foyt IV, who qualified second and third, failed technical inspection and were moved to the back of the starting grid.

== Race ==
Pos	No.	Driver	Team	Laps	Time/Retired	Grid	Laps Led	Points
1	9	(New Zealand) Scott Dixon	Chip Ganassi Racing	200	1:44:03.5914	1	67	50
2	26	(United States) Marco Andretti	Andretti Green Racing	200	+0.5828	4	85	43
3	10	(United Kingdom) Dan Wheldon	Chip Ganassi Racing	200	+1.4728	22	9	35
4	3	(Brazil) Hélio Castroneves	Penske Racing	200	+8.0340	5	4	32
5	20	(United States) Ed Carpenter	Vision Racing	199	+1 Lap	24	0	30
6	7	(United States) Danica Patrick	Andretti Green Racing	199	+1 Lap	2	0	28
7	17	(United States) Ryan Hunter-Reay	Rahal Letterman Racing	199	+1 Lap	9	0	26
8	11	(Brazil) Tony Kanaan	Andretti Green Racing	198	+2 Laps	6	35	24
9	2	(United States) A. J. Foyt IV	Vision Racing	198	+2 Laps	25	0	22
10	4	(Brazil) Vítor Meira	Panther Racing	197	+3 Laps	10	0	20
11	15	(United States) Buddy Rice	Dreyer & Reinbold Racing	196	+4 Laps	11	0	19
12	5	(Spain) Oriol Servià (R)	KV Racing	195	+5 Laps	14	0	18
13	14	(United Kingdom) Darren Manning	A. J. Foyt Enterprises	194	+6 Laps	12	0	17
14	34	(France) Franck Perera (R)	Conquest Racing	194	+6 Laps	13	0	16
15	02	(United Kingdom) Justin Wilson (R)	Newman/Haas/Lanigan Racing	193	+7 Laps	15	0	15
16	19	(Brazil) Mario Moraes (R)	Dale Coyne Racing	187	+13 laps	21	0	14
17	33	(Venezuela) E. J. Viso (R)	HVM Racing	183	Accident	18	0	13
18	36	(Brazil) Enrique Bernoldi (R)	Conquest Racing	149	Handling	17	0	12
19	6	(Australia) Ryan Briscoe	Penske Racing	126	Collision	3	0	12
20	23	(Venezuela) Milka Duno	Dreyer & Reinbold Racing	122	Collision	16	0	12
21	25	(Canada) Marty Roth	Roth Racing	53	Handling	8	0	12
22	24	(United Kingdom) Jay Howard (R)	Roth Racing	50	Handling	23	0	12
23	18	(Brazil) Bruno Junqueira	Dale Coyne Racing	40	Handling	20	0	12
24	27	(Japan) Hideki Mutoh (R)	Andretti Green Racing	32	Mechanical	7	0	12
25	8	(Australia) Will Power (R)	KV Racing	24	Mechanical	19	0	10

Average race speed: 171.248 mph
Cautions: 3 for 24 laps
Lead changes: 12

== Broadcasting ==
=== Television ===
The race was televised in high definition in the United States on ESPN 2, the telecast utilized the Side-by-Side format for commercial breaks.

ABC Television
Booth Announcers	Pit/garage reporters
Announcer: Marty Reid; Color: Scott Goodyear	Jack Arute; Vince Welch; Brienne Pedigo

=== Radio ===
The race was broadcast on radio by the IMS Radio Network. Mike King served as anchor. Davey Hamilton was the driver analyst.

Indianapolis Motor Speedway Radio Network
Booth Announcers	Turn Reporter	Pit/garage reporters
Chief Announcer: Mike King; Driver expert: Davey Hamilton	Turns 1, 2, and Backstretch: Mark Jaynes	Kevin Olson; Kevin Lee; Bob Jenkins; Dave Wilson

Preceded by none	IRL IndyCar Series; 2008	Succeeded by 2008 Honda Grand Prix of St. Petersburg
