= Keith Wiggins =

English motor racing team owner

Keith Wiggins (born 1 July 1958) is a motor racing team owner born in Great Britain and one of only three people ever to have owned a Formula One team, an IndyCar and a ChampCar team.

== Early career ==
Born in London, England on 1 July 1958, Wiggins began his racing career while at school as a kart driver in 1973. He was selected as a member of the British International Kart Team for 1975–76. He trained as a design engineer for specialist road car conversions and later joined Ron Dennis' Project Four Racing in 1977 for Formula 2, and then as an engineer in British Formula 3 in 1988. In 1979, Wiggins continued his driving career in British Formula Ford, finishing second in the Championship. The following year (1980), he focused on his management and engineering skills, joining Rushen Green Racing for British F3. In 1982, he was appointed team manager and chief engineer with Van Diemen in British and European Formula 2000. During this period, he also constructed a development Formula Ford chassis designed by David Baldwin which became the next generation Van Diemen Formula 2000 chassis.

== Pacific Racing ==
Wiggins established Pacific Racing in 1984 as owner, chairman, and chief engineer. The team went on to unrivalled success over the following 13 years. Pacific won every European single-seater championship on its way up to Formula One and is the only team ever to climb from the lowest ranks to compete at the premier level. With JJ Lehto, David Coulthard, Eddie Irvine and Christian Fittipaldi behind the wheel of his cars, he moved the operation to Formula One in 1994.

Pacific Racing Achievements:

- 1984 1st European & Benelux Formula Ford 1600 Championships
- 1985 1st British Formula Ford 1600 Championship
- 1986 1st British & World Formula Ford 2000 Championships
- 1987 1st British, European, & World Formula Ford 2000 Championships
- 1988 1st British Formula 3 Championship
- 1991 1st FIA Formula 3000 Championship
- 1993 2nd FIA European Formula 3000
- 1994–1995 FIA Formula One World Championship

The team Pacific Grand Prix ran on a shoestring budget for two seasons, designing, building and racing their own chassis, with highest finishing positions of eighth at the 1995 German and Australian Grands Prix. The inaugural year they ran struggling Ilmor engines and battled with Simtek at the rear of the grid. Just making the grid was a challenge; while Bertrand Gachot qualified for five of the first seven events, Paul Belmondo made it just twice. They qualified and ran every race in 1995 with Gachot and Andrea Montermini, Jean-Denis Délétraz, and Giovanni Lavaggi, but Wiggins returned to F3000 in 1996, plus competed at LeMans with a BRM-Nissan and then closed Pacific in 1997.

== Lola ==
In 1998, following MasterCard Lola's ill-fated decision to enter Formula One, Wiggins helped to get the newly purchased Lola out of receivership and back on its feet, then serving as Vice-President and then President of Lola Cars International Inc. in America and Sales and Marketing Director of Lola Cars International in the UK.

== Indycar ==
Wiggins left Lola in 2000 and took over as president and team owner of Tony Bettenhausen Jr.'s CART team following a tragic plane crash which killed Tony, renaming it Herdez Competition in 2001. Michel Jourdain Jr. remained in the cockpit and Mario Domínguez replaced him in 2002, winning at Surfers Paradise and claiming Rookie of the Year. Herdez remained as title sponsor until 2005, with three further wins, by Ryan Hunter-Reay and Mario Dominquez and a dominant performance of first and second in the streets of Miami in 2003. In 2005, promising youngsters Björn Wirdheim and Ronnie Bremer were signed, together with others to get through a tough season due to a lack of sponsorship.

By that point, the team had been renamed HVM (Herdez Viva Mexico) and in October 2005 Cedric the Entertainer announced he had become a partner in the team. The team's name changed in 2006 to CTE-HVM Racing. They finished fourth in the championship with Frenchman Nelson Philippe, who won at Surfers Paradise.

In 2007, ex Minardi owner Paul Stoddart bought into the team and they renamed it Minardi Team USA fielding ex-F1 Driver Robert Doornbos and Dan Clarke for a second season, Wiggins being the managing partner. In the 2007 season, the team claimed two wins and seven podiums on its way to third place in Championship standings and Rookie of the Year with Doornbos and a pole position for Clark. With Champ Car's unification with the Indy Racing League IndyCar Series in 2008, Stoddart left the team and it appeared that the team would shut down, however, Wiggins assumed full control of the team again and signed E. J. Viso to continue racing operations in the IndyCar Series, with the team's name reverting to HVM Racing. In 2010 the team brought new rookie driver Simona de Silvestro into IndyCar and she finished 14th at the Indianapolis 500 and became the 'Rookie of the Year'.

HVM Racing earned six victories, three pole positions, 22 podiums, 40 top-five finishes and 97 top-tens. The team also earned "Indianapolis 500 Rookie of the Year" honors with driver Simona de Silvestro in 2010. HVM finished fourth and third, respectively, in the Champ Car World Series in 2006 and 2007, and earned drivers Mario Dominguez and Robert Doornbos Rookie of the Year honors in 2002 and 2007, respectively.
