= 2010 Kentucky Indy 300 =

(United States) 2010 Kentucky Indy 300
Race details
- 15th round of the 2010 IndyCar Series season
- Date: September 4, 2010
- Official name: Kentucky Indy 300
- Location: Kentucky Speedway
- Course: Permanent racing facility 1.480 mi / 2.382 km
- Distance: 200 laps 296.000 mi / 476.366 km
- Weather: 67 °F (19 °C), clear skies

Pole position
- Driver: (United States) Ed Carpenter (Panther Racing)
- Time: 48.8958 (2-lap)

Fastest lap
- Driver: (United States) Ryan Hunter-Reay (Andretti Autosport)
- Time: 24.2752 (on lap 18 of 200)

Podium
- First: (Brazil) Hélio Castroneves (Team Penske)
- Second: (United States) Ed Carpenter (Panther Racing)
- Third: (United Kingdom) Dan Wheldon (Panther Racing)

The 2010 Kentucky Indy 300 was the eleventh running of the Kentucky Indy 300 and the fifteenth round of the 2010 IndyCar Series season. It took place on Saturday, September 4, 2010. The race contested over 200 laps at the 1.480-mile (2.382 km) Kentucky Speedway in Sparta, Kentucky.

== Classification ==
=== Qualifying ===
Pos	No.	Driver	Team	Lap 1	Lap 2	Total
1	20	(United States) Ed Carpenter	Panther Racing	24.4414	24.4544	48.8958
2	12	(Australia) Will Power	Team Penske	24.4469	24.4723	48.9192
3	4	(United Kingdom) Dan Wheldon	Panther Racing	24.4840	24.4640	48.9480
4	9	(New Zealand) Scott Dixon	Chip Ganassi Racing	24.5009	24.4848	48.9857
5	06	(Japan) Hideki Mutoh	Newman/Haas Racing	24.4871	24.5343	49.0214
6	34	(Belgium) Bertrand Baguette (R)	Conquest Racing	24.5291	24.5796	49.1087
7	32	(Brazil) Mario Moraes	KV Racing Technology	24.5877	24.5458	49.1335
8	3	(Brazil) Hélio Castroneves	Team Penske	24.5988	24.5395	49.1383
9	6	(Australia) Ryan Briscoe	Team Penske	24.5666	24.6301	49.1967
10	36	(South Africa) Tomas Scheckter	Conquest Racing	24.6000	24.5991	49.1991
11	10	(United Kingdom) Dario Franchitti	Chip Ganassi Racing	24.6178	24.5942	49.2120
12	14	(Brazil) Vítor Meira	A. J. Foyt Enterprises	24.6330	24.6013	49.2343
13	77	(Canada) Alex Tagliani	FAZZT Race Team	24.5926	24.6517	49.2443
14	5	(Japan) Takuma Sato (R)	KV Racing Technology	24.6401	24.6327	49.2728
15	26	(United States) Marco Andretti	Andretti Autosport	24.6797	24.6142	49.2939
16	22	(United Kingdom) Justin Wilson	Dreyer & Reinbold Racing	24.6761	24.6701	49.3462
17	7	(United States) Danica Patrick	Andretti Autosport	24.7322	24.6422	49.3744
18	19	(United Kingdom) Alex Lloyd (R)	Dale Coyne Racing	24.7734	24.7267	49.5001
19	78	(Switzerland) Simona de Silvestro (R)	HVM Racing	24.8104	24.7517	49.5621
20	2	(Brazil) Raphael Matos	de Ferran Dragon Racing	24.7809	24.7938	49.5747
21	67	(United States) Sarah Fisher	Sarah Fisher Racing	24.8375	24.7684	49.6059
22	8	(Venezuela) E. J. Viso	KV Racing Technology	24.8667	24.7897	49.6564
23	24	(Canada) Paul Tracy	Dreyer & Reinbold Racing	24.8989	24.8328	49.7317
24	18	(Venezuela) Milka Duno	Dale Coyne Racing	24.9899	24.9579	49.9478
25	66	(United States) Graham Rahal	Sarah Fisher Racing	25.2216	24.9565	50.1781
26	11	(Brazil) Tony Kanaan	Andretti Autosport	25.3817	25.1611	50.5428
27	37	(United States) Ryan Hunter-Reay	Andretti Autosport			no time
OFFICIAL QUALIFICATIONS REPORT

=== Race ===
Pos	No.	Driver	Team	Laps	Time/Retired	Points
1	3	(Brazil) Hélio Castroneves	Team Penske	200	1:41:50.0059	50
2	20	(United States) Ed Carpenter	Panther Racing	200	1:42:03.1656	41
3	4	(United Kingdom) Dan Wheldon	Panther Racing	200	1:42:03.9273	37
4	11	(Brazil) Tony Kanaan	Andretti Autosport	200	1:42:03.9990	32
5	10	(United Kingdom) Dario Franchitti	Chip Ganassi Racing	200	1:42:04.2027	30
6	26	(United States) Marco Andretti	Andretti Autosport	200	1:42:04.5728	28
7	9	(New Zealand) Scott Dixon	Chip Ganassi Racing	200	1:42:05.1084	26
8	12	(Australia) Will Power	Team Penske	200	1:42:05.6201	24
9	7	(United States) Danica Patrick	Andretti Autosport	200	1:42:05.8553	22
10	34	(Belgium) Bertrand Baguette (R)	Conquest Racing	199	+1 lap	20
11	22	(United Kingdom) Justin Wilson	Dreyer & Reinbold Racing	199	+1 lap	19
12	24	(Canada) Paul Tracy	Dreyer & Reinbold Racing	199	+1 lap	18
13	19	(United Kingdom) Alex Lloyd (R)	Dale Coyne Racing	199	+1 lap	17
14	36	(South Africa) Tomas Scheckter	Conquest Racing	199	+1 lap	16
15	77	(Canada) Alex Tagliani	FAZZT Race Team	199	+1 lap	15
16	2	(Brazil) Raphael Matos	de Ferran Dragon Racing	199	+1 lap	14
17	06	(Japan) Hideki Mutoh	Newman/Haas Racing	199	+1 lap	13
18	32	(Brazil) Mario Moraes	KV Racing Technology	198	+2 laps	12
19	18	(Venezuela) Milka Duno	Dale Coyne Racing	195	+5 laps	12
20	66	(United States) Graham Rahal	Sarah Fisher Racing	195	+5 laps	12
21	37	(United States) Ryan Hunter-Reay	Andretti Autosport	174	Mechanical	12
22	67	(United States) Sarah Fisher	Sarah Fisher Racing	134	Mechanical	12
23	14	(Brazil) Vítor Meira	A. J. Foyt Enterprises	79	Contact	12
24	6	(Australia) Ryan Briscoe	Team Penske	79	Contact	12
25	78	(Switzerland) Simona de Silvestro (R)	HVM Racing	78	Contact	10
26	8	(Venezuela) E. J. Viso	KV Racing Technology	45	Mechanical	10
27	5	(Japan) Takuma Sato (R)	KV Racing Technology	0	Contact	10
OFFICIAL RACE REPORT

Previous race: 2010 Peak Antifreeze & Motor Oil Indy 300	IZOD IndyCar Series; 2010 season	Next race: 2010 Indy Japan 300
Previous race: 2009 Meijer Indy 300	Kentucky Indy 300	Next race: 2011 Kentucky Indy 300
