= 2009 Honda Grand Prix of St. Petersburg =

(United States) 2009 St. Petersburg
Race details
- 1st round of the 2009 IndyCar Series season
- Date: April 5, 2009
- Official name: Honda Grand Prix of St. Petersburg
- Location: Streets of St. Petersburg
- Course: Temporary Street Circuit; 1.800 mi / 2.897 km
- Distance: 100 laps 180.000 mi / 289.682 km
- Weather: 86 °F (30 °C), Sunny

Pole position
- Driver: (United States) Graham Rahal (N/H/L Racing)
- Time: 1:02.4110

Fastest lap
- Driver: (United Kingdom) Justin Wilson (Dale Coyne Racing)
- Time: 1:03.2440 (on lap 54 of 100)

Podium
- First: (Australia) Ryan Briscoe (Penske Racing)
- Second: (United States) Ryan Hunter-Reay (Vision Racing)
- Third: (United Kingdom) Justin Wilson (Dale Coyne Racing)

Chronology
Previous	Next
2008	2010

The Honda Grand Prix of St. Petersburg was the opening round of the 2009 IndyCar Series on April 5, 2009. It was the first time in IndyCar Series history that the season begins on a road course and not an oval. The race saw 4 drivers make their debuts in the championship: Stanton Barrett, Mike Conway, Robert Doornbos and Raphael Matos. The race was contested over 100 laps of the 1.80 mile street course.

Graham Rahal started from the pole but a poor start meant that he dropped back and out of contention for the victory. Defending champion Scott Dixon crashed out on lap 80, a poor start to his defence of the title, which left Penske's Ryan Briscoe to take the chequered flag from Ryan Hunter-Reay who finished 2nd and Justin Wilson who came home 3rd.

== Race ==
Pos	No.	Driver	Team	Laps	Time/Retired	Grid	Laps Led	Points
1	6	(Australia) Ryan Briscoe	Team Penske	100	2:12:26.8387	4	46	50
2	21	(United States) Ryan Hunter-Reay	Vision Racing	100	+ 0.4619	14	0	40
3	19	(United Kingdom) Justin Wilson	Dale Coyne Racing	100	+ 0.9490	2	52	37
4	10	(United Kingdom) Dario Franchitti	Chip Ganassi Racing	100	+ 1.5230	5	0	32
5	11	(Brazil) Tony Kanaan	Andretti Green Racing	100	+ 2.3214	3	0	30
6	3	(Australia) Will Power	Team Penske	100	+ 3.4622	6	0	28
7	02	(United States) Graham Rahal	Newman/Haas/Lanigan Racing	100	+ 4.0672	1	0	27
8	23	(United Kingdom) Darren Manning	Dreyer & Reinbold Racing	100	+ 4.7283	10	0	24
9	14	(Brazil) Vítor Meira	A. J. Foyt Enterprises	100	+ 5.9559	17	0	22
10	34	(Canada) Alex Tagliani	Conquest Racing	99	+ 1 Lap	7	0	20
11	06	(Netherlands) Robert Doornbos (R)	Newman/Haas/Lanigan Racing	96	+ 4 Laps	13	0	19
12	98	(United States) Stanton Barrett (R)	Team 3G	96	+ 4 Laps	21	0	18
13	26	(United States) Marco Andretti	Andretti Green Racing	94	Contact	18	2	17
14	4	(United Kingdom) Dan Wheldon	Panther Racing	86	Contact	11	0	16
15	27	(Japan) Hideki Mutoh	Andretti Green Racing	86	Contact	19	0	15
16	9	(New Zealand) Scott Dixon	Chip Ganassi Racing	80	Contact	8	0	14
17	13	(Venezuela) E. J. Viso	HVM Racing	75	Mechanical	16	0	13
18	20	(United States) Ed Carpenter	Vision Racing	71	Contact	22	0	12
19	7	(United States) Danica Patrick	Andretti Green Racing	31	Contact	15	0	12
20	2	(Brazil) Raphael Matos (R)	Luczo-Dragon Racing	31	Contact	9	0	12
21	5	(Brazil) Mario Moraes	KV Racing Technology	31	Contact	20	0	12
22	24	(United Kingdom) Mike Conway (R)	Dreyer & Reinbold Racing	1	Contact	12	0	12
Sources:

- The race exceeded road racing's traditional two-hour time limit. No reason was given for this.

Previous race: 2008 Nikon Indy 300	IndyCar Series; 2009 season	Next race: 2009 Toyota Grand Prix of Long Beach
Previous race: 2008 Honda Grand Prix of St. Petersburg	2009 Honda Grand Prix of St. Petersburg	Next race: 2010 Honda Grand Prix of St. Petersburg
