= 2010 Honda Grand Prix of St. Petersburg =

(United States) 2010 St. Petersburg
Race details
- 2nd round of the 2010 IndyCar Series season
- Date: March 29, 2010
- Official name: Honda Grand Prix of St. Petersburg
- Location: Streets of St. Petersburg
- Course: Temporary street circuit 1.800 mi / 2.897 km
- Distance: 100 laps 180.000 mi / 289.682 km
- Weather: 62 °F (17 °C), scattered clouds

Pole position
- Driver: (Australia) Will Power (Team Penske)
- Time: 1:01.6026

Fastest lap
- Driver: (Venezuela) E. J. Viso (KV Racing Technology)
- Time: 1:03.8605 (on lap 80 of 100)

Podium
- First: (Australia) Will Power (Team Penske)
- Second: (United Kingdom) Justin Wilson (Dreyer & Reinbold Racing)
- Third: (Australia) Ryan Briscoe (Team Penske)

Chronology
Previous	Next
2009	2011

The 2010 Honda Grand Prix of St. Petersburg was the second race of the 2010 IZOD IndyCar Series season. The race took place on March 29, on the 1.800-mile (2.897 km) temporary street circuit in St. Petersburg, Florida, and was telecast by ESPN2 in the United States. The event was due to take place on March 28 and telecast on ABC, but was postponed by series officials due to safety concerns after torrential rain fell on the circuit.

== Report ==
=== Race ===
On the day of the race, torrential rain fell on the circuit, and the series officials decided to postpone the race to the next day as they deemed the track to be too wet.

The race started as scheduled on Monday, however due to earlier rain, there were damp patches in certain areas of the track. Will Power, the polesitter and the winner of the opening race in São Paulo led the field ahead of Marco Andretti. Further down the field, both Mike Conway and Dario Franchitti ran on to the damp patches and spun in different areas of the race track, bringing out the caution. Franchitti suffered light contact with the wall and had to be refired, but was able to stay on the lead lap with no major damage to his car.

The race went green on the fourth lap, and Andretti did not take too long to take the lead from Power, who struggled for tyre temperature and quickly dropped to fourth place. Andretti only led for one lap before surrendering the lead to Scott Dixon, who passed him into turn 1. As the stint progressed, Will Power began to find pace and was back into second by lap 19, whereas Andretti had dropped to fourth behind Power's Penske teammate, Hélio Castroneves. The second caution of the race came out at one-quarter distance when Takuma Sato, running in ninth place, outbraked himself into turn 3 and buried himself in the tyres, and negated the 7 second lead which Scott Dixon had built over his pursuers.

During this caution, the race leaders made their first pitstops of the day whereas some drivers further down the field stayed out. Vítor Meira took the lead ahead of Raphael Matos and Dario Franchitti, with Dixon in ninth place. When the track went green, Meira comfortably held on to the lead, with most of the action occurring mid-pack as the drivers who had pitted under the caution sought to make their way up the field on new tyres. Mario Moraes and Dixon came together in turn 1 while battling for 7th, which left Dixon with a damaged front wing and Moraes with a flat tire. Both drivers had to pit at the end of the lap for repairs and rejoined at the tail of the field, along with Marco Andretti who had to pit for a flat tire after collecting debris.

Meira, Matos and Franchitti all pitted within ten laps after the green flag was waved, and Ryan Briscoe took the lead on lap 41. He was followed by Hideki Mutoh, but the Japanese driver soon came under attack from Hélio Castroneves, the first of the drivers who had pitted under the second caution. On lap 47, Dan Wheldon, who was running just outside the top ten suffered a suspension failure at turn 1 which sent his car straight into that of Mario Moraesin front of him. Both drivers were unhurt but this resulted in the third caution of the race coming out. The lead trio of Briscoe, Mutoh and Castroneves were among the drivers who decided to pit, and Will Power who was running fourth stayed out and took the lead. Power comfortably led at the restart, and set about building a gap to the cars of Justin Wilson and E. J. Viso who were running second and third. The man on the move was Scott Dixon, who in two green laps had moved from eighth to fourth and was soon pressuring third-placed Viso. Dixon's Ganassi teammate Franchitti however found himself at the tail of the field again after having to pit for a flat tire.

On lap 65, Castroneves made a move on countryman Raphael Matos at turn 3. The move pushed Matos wide, and Mike Conway attempted to follow Castroneves through, however his car was not fully ahead of Matos's and they touched at turn 4, with Conway ending up in the wall and a full course caution being called. With 34 laps left, the entire field took the opportunity to come in under yellow and fill their cars with fuel to the end. The only exception was Vitor Meira, as he had yet to use the red-walled soft compound tires, and the A. J. Foyt team believed that the tyres would not last for a long stint. Meira thus led ahead of Viso (who had pitted just before the caution), Power, Wilson and Briscoe who had moved up 4 spots on pit lane.

Meira led for four laps after the green came out before being forced to make his final stop. Viso took the lead but immediately slowed with the gearbox problem and dropped way back, eventually having to pit for repairs and rejoining three laps down. Will Power thus found himself back in the lead ahead of Wilson, Briscoe and Dixon. Dixon did not last much longer, as he crashed into the outside wall after clipping the inside wall with his right rear tire at turn 5 and the caution came out again.

A five-lap period under caution eased any fuel worries anyone had, and once the track went green, Power led the field again. Unlike the previous occasion, he was unable to build a large gap to the second-placed car of Wilson. Briscoe and Castroneves kept a watching brief on the two leaders, and behind them Dario Franchitti was on the charge, passing cars one after the other. At the front, Justin Wilson was able to keep Power honest but never got close enough to make an overtaking move, and the Australian crossed the line to make it two wins out of two. Wilson was second ahead of Power's two teammates, Briscoe and Castroneves. Franchitti's late race charge took him to fifth place having passed Tagliani with three laps left. Danica Patrick, despite being on the red tires in the last stint finished seventh ahead of Matos, Graham Rahal and Tony Kanaan.

== Classification ==
=== Qualifying ===
- All cars were split into two groups of twelve, with the fastest six from each group going through to the "top 12" session. In this session, the fastest six cars progressed to the "Firestone Fast Six". The fastest driver in the final session claimed pole, with the rest of the cars lining up in session order, regardless of qualifying times. (fast six from 1–6, top 12 from 7–12 and round 1 from 13–24, with group 1 drivers occupying the odd–numbered grid positions, and group 2 drivers occupying the even–numbered grid positions.

Pos	No.	Driver	Team	Group 1	Group 2	Top 12	Fast 6
1	12	(Australia) Will Power	Team Penske		1:02.0440	1:01.4816	1:01.6026
2	11	(Brazil) Tony Kanaan	Andretti Autosport		1:01.9094	1:01.8103	1:01.8797
3	9	(New Zealand) Scott Dixon	Chip Ganassi Racing		1:01.7912	1:01.6617	1:02.0820
4	22	(United Kingdom) Justin Wilson	Dreyer & Reinbold Racing	1:02.0694		1:01.8727	1:02.1992
5	3	(Brazil) Hélio Castroneves	Team Penske	1:01.8881		1:01.8966	1:02.2118
6	26	(United States) Marco Andretti	Andretti Autosport	1:02.1774		1:01.8771	1:02.3461
7	37	(United States) Ryan Hunter-Reay	Andretti Autosport	1:02.1101		1:01.8979	
8	77	(Canada) Alex Tagliani	FAZZT Race Team	1:02.0521		1:01.9692	
9	8	(Venezuela) E. J. Viso	KV Racing Technology	1:02.1254		1:01.9807	
10	24	(United Kingdom) Mike Conway	Dreyer & Reinbold Racing		1:02.1081	1:02.0434	
11	5	(Japan) Takuma Sato (R)	KV Racing Technology		1:02.2969	1:02.4205	
12	06	(Japan) Hideki Mutoh	Newman/Haas/Lanigan Racing		1:02.4473	1:02.5113	
13	10	(United Kingdom) Dario Franchitti	Chip Ganassi Racing	1:02.1944			
14	78	(Switzerland) Simona de Silvestro (R)	HVM Racing		1:02.4493		
15	4	(United Kingdom) Dan Wheldon	Panther Racing	1:02.2557			
16	67	(United States) Graham Rahal	Sarah Fisher Racing		1:02.5044		
17	14	(Brazil) Vítor Meira	A. J. Foyt Enterprises	1:02.2688			
18	34	(Brazil) Mario Romancini (R)	Conquest Racing		1:02.7366		
19	6	(Australia) Ryan Briscoe	Team Penske	1:02.3205			
20	32	(Brazil) Mario Moraes	KV Racing Technology		1:02.8294		
21	7	(United States) Danica Patrick	Andretti Autosport	1:02.4904			
22	19	(United Kingdom) Alex Lloyd (R)	Dale Coyne Racing		1:03.4793		
23	2	(Brazil) Raphael Matos	Luczo Dragon Racing de Ferran Motorsports	1:03.0144			
24	18	(Venezuela) Milka Duno	Dale Coyne Racing		1:08.5058		

=== Race ===
Pos	No.	Driver	Team	Laps	Time/Status	Grid	Laps Led	Points
1	12	(Australia) Will Power	Team Penske	100	2:07:05.7968	1	50	53
2	22	(United Kingdom) Justin Wilson	Dreyer & Reinbold Racing	100	+ 0.8244	4	0	40
3	6	(Australia) Ryan Briscoe	Team Penske	100	+ 4.7290	19	9	35
4	3	(Brazil) Hélio Castroneves	Team Penske	100	+ 5.1699	5	0	32
5	10	(United Kingdom) Dario Franchitti	Chip Ganassi Racing	100	+ 22.2172	13	3	30
6	77	(Canada) Alex Tagliani	FAZZT Race Team	100	+ 29.3224	8	0	28
7	7	(United States) Danica Patrick	Andretti Autosport	100	+ 30.3360	21	0	26
8	2	(Brazil) Raphael Matos	Luczo Dragon Racing de Ferran Motorsports	100	+ 30.6695	23	3	24
9	67	(United States) Graham Rahal	Sarah Fisher Racing	100	+ 30.8426	16	0	22
10	11	(Brazil) Tony Kanaan	Andretti Autosport	100	+ 31.3508	2	0	20
11	37	(United States) Ryan Hunter-Reay	Andretti Autosport	100	+ 31.6286	7	0	19
12	26	(United States) Marco Andretti	Andretti Autosport	100	+ 32.1703	6	1	18
13	34	(Brazil) Mario Romancini (R)	Conquest Racing	100	+ 39.8086	18	0	17
14	06	(Japan) Hideki Mutoh	Newman/Haas/Lanigan Racing	100	+ 39.9949	12	0	16
15	14	(Brazil) Vítor Meira	A. J. Foyt Enterprises	100	+ 56.0593	17	12	15
16	78	(Switzerland) Simona de Silvestro (R)	HVM Racing	99	+ 1 Lap	14	0	14
17	8	(Venezuela) E. J. Viso	KV Racing Technology	97	+ 3 Laps	9	1	13
18	9	(New Zealand) Scott Dixon	Chip Ganassi Racing	73	Contact	3	21	12
19	24	(United Kingdom) Mike Conway	Dreyer & Reinbold Racing	64	Contact	10	0	12
20	4	(United Kingdom) Dan Wheldon	Panther Racing	46	Contact	15	0	12
21	32	(Brazil) Mario Moraes	KV Racing Technology	45	Contact	20	0	12
22	5	(Japan) Takuma Sato (R)	KV Racing Technology	24	Contact	11	0	12
23	19	(United Kingdom) Alex Lloyd (R)	Dale Coyne Racing	14	Contact	22	0	12
24	18	(Venezuela) Milka Duno	Dale Coyne Racing	7	Handling	24	0	12
OFFICIAL RACE REPORT

== Championship standings after the race ==
Drivers' Championship standings

Pos	Driver	Points
1	(Australia) Will Power	103
2	(United States) Ryan Hunter-Reay	59
	(United Kingdom) Justin Wilson	59
	(United Kingdom) Dario Franchitti	59
5	(Brazil) Raphael Matos	56

- Note: Only the top five positions are included.

Previous race: 2010 São Paulo Indy 300	IZOD IndyCar Series; 2010 season	Next race: 2010 Indy Grand Prix of Alabama
Previous race: 2009 Honda Grand Prix of St. Petersburg	Honda Grand Prix of St. Petersburg	Next race: 2011 Honda Grand Prix of St. Petersburg
