= HVM Racing =

Auto racing team

(United States) HVM Racing
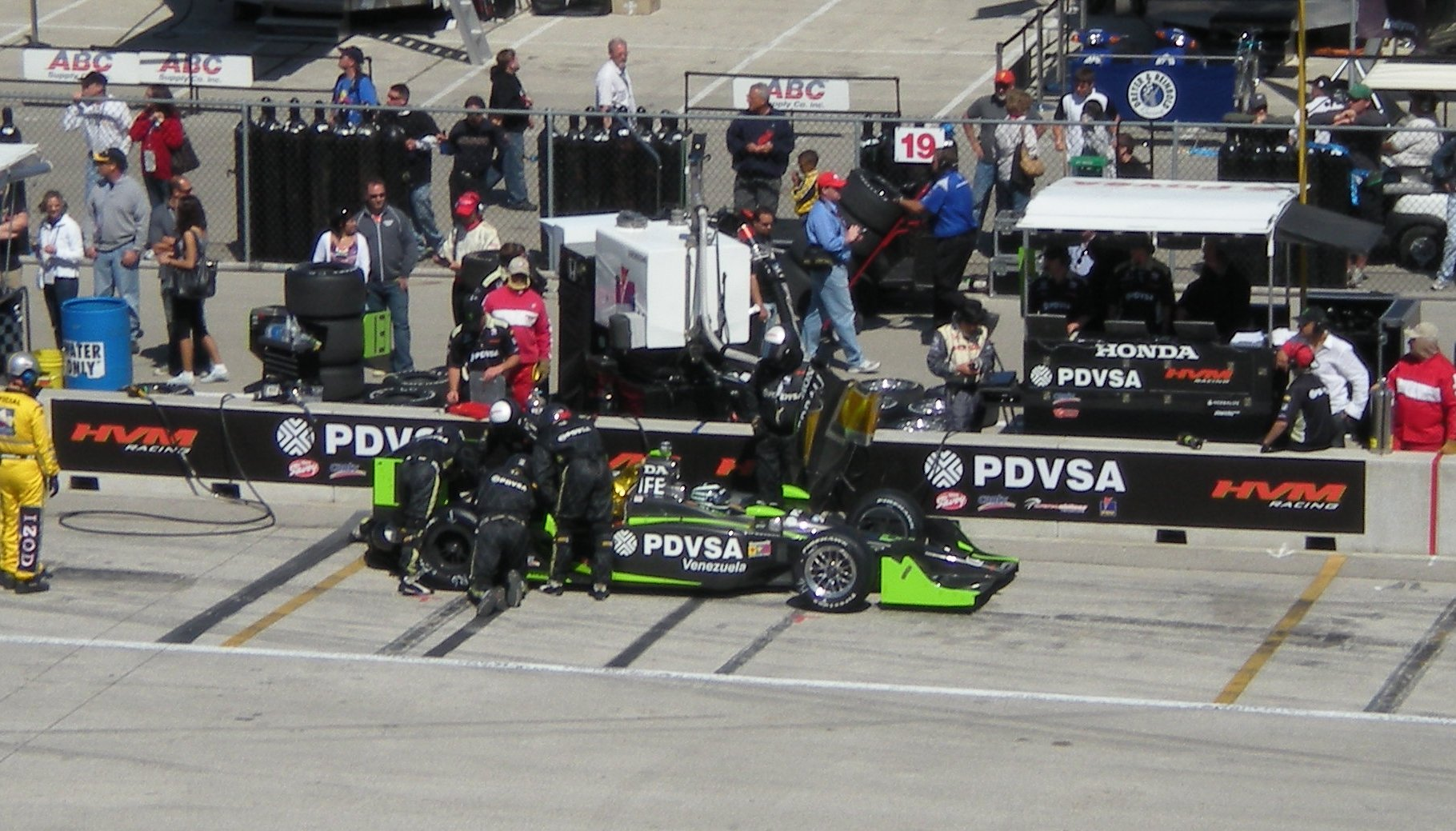
- Principal(s): Keith Wiggins; Paul Stoddart
- Base: Indianapolis, Indiana, USA

Career
- Debut: 1986 Indianapolis 500
- Latest race: 2012 MAVTV 500 IndyCar World Championships
- Races competed: 407
- Drivers' Championships: 0
- Indy 500 victories: 0
- Race victories: 6
- Pole positions: 1

HVM Racing was an auto racing team owned by Keith Wiggins that competed in the IndyCar Series. It competed in the Champ Car World Series in 2007 as Minardi Team USA when it was co-owned by Paul Stoddart. It has a long history of changes of ownership, beginning as Bettenhausen Motorsports and including a previous incarnation as CTE-HVM Racing, co-owned by actor/comedian Cedric the Entertainer.

Its 2007 driver lineup was Dan Clarke and former Formula One driver Robert Doornbos, who previously raced for Minardi F1.

In the first race of the season, the 2007 Las Vegas Grand Prix, Robert Doornbos made the most successful debut since Nigel Mansell in 1993, finishing second on the podium.

They also made the distinction of being the only team willing to run a car numbered 13 full-time, with driver E. J. Viso, when they did so for the 2009 IndyCar Series season, despite negative superstitions from the past about running it in any form of motorsport.

== History ==
=== Bettenhausen Motorsports ===
The team began in 1986 as Bettenhausen Motorsports, with Tony Bettenhausen Jr. serving as both the team owner and primary driver through 1991. Bettenhausen began to reduce his role as a driver beginning in 1992 before making his final CART appearance in the 1993 Indianapolis 500. After Bettenhausen's retirement from driving, the team hired on several notable drivers over their tenure. Formula One veteran Stefan Johansson was the team's primary driver from 1993–1996, while future stars Patrick Carpentier and Hélio Castroneves drove for the team in 1997 and 1998, respectively. During most of the 1990s, Bettenhausen Motorsports' cars were primarily dark blue, white and red with Alumax Aluminum sponsorship. The 1992 car appeared in the cover of the 1993 video game IndyCar Racing.

For 1999, the team signed Shigeaki Hattori as their primary driver, but ran only a partial schedule. Hattori, however, struggled, and ultimately had his competitor's license revoked by chief steward Wally Dallenbach Sr. before the race at Laguna Seca due to a high number of crashes and spins throughout the season.

=== Beginning of the Keith Wiggins era ===
Before the 2000 season started, Bettenhausen, his wife and two business associates were killed in a plane crash on their way home from vacation in Florida. The team was renamed Herdez Competition as Michel Jourdain Jr. came aboard with Wiggins taking over as co-owner and managing director. Two uncompetitive seasons followed and Mario Domínguez was brought into the team in 2002. A fortunate victory came at Surfers Paradise in a water-logged event, as Dominguez started last and failed to pass a single car on track but benefited from pit strategy.

The win boosted his confidence and the team recorded a 1-2 result at Miami, Dominguez leading Roberto Moreno, was the highlight of a much-improved 2003 season, finishing fifth in the championship. Ryan Hunter-Reay came into the team in 2004 and led all 250 laps at The Milwaukee Mile from the pole position. Herdez sponsorship faded at the end of the year and for 2005, with the team now called HVM, Wiggins was forced to take on pay-drivers Björn Wirdheim and Ronnie Bremer. Despite Wirdheim's impressive performances in the 2003 International Formula 3000 season, his subsequent championship title, and Jaguar F1 testing experience, he failed to regularly beat Bremer during the season. Both of their funds dried up, however, before the end of the season and several other drivers had chances in the team's two cars.

Cedric the Entertainer became a co-owner late in the season and added a celebrity presence to the field. The cars that year ran a distinctive gunmetal gray livery with Cedric's A Bird and A Bear entertainment company on the sidepods. Nelson Philippe won in Australia and the team recorded their best season with a fourth place in the championship by Philippe.

=== Minardi Team USA ===
In 2006, Paul Stoddart, former owner of the Minardi Formula One team, bought an interest in the team and renamed it Minardi Team USA. For the 2007 season, Stoddart and Wiggins lined up the services of Dan Clarke and Red Bull F1 Racing test driver Robert Doornbos. With Doornbos the team began competing for podium positions regularly. The team scored its first win under the Minardi Team USA banner at the 2007 Champ Car Grand Prix de Mont Tremblant. Doornbos went on to capture another win at San Jose, and his tally for 2007 was 2 wins and 6 podiums. Doornbos went on to finish 3rd in Championship standings, earn Rookie of the Year, and was the highest finishing Rookie in the Champ Car World Series since Juan Pablo Montoya in 1999. Doornbos also won the award for Hard Charger, improving the most positions during the race.

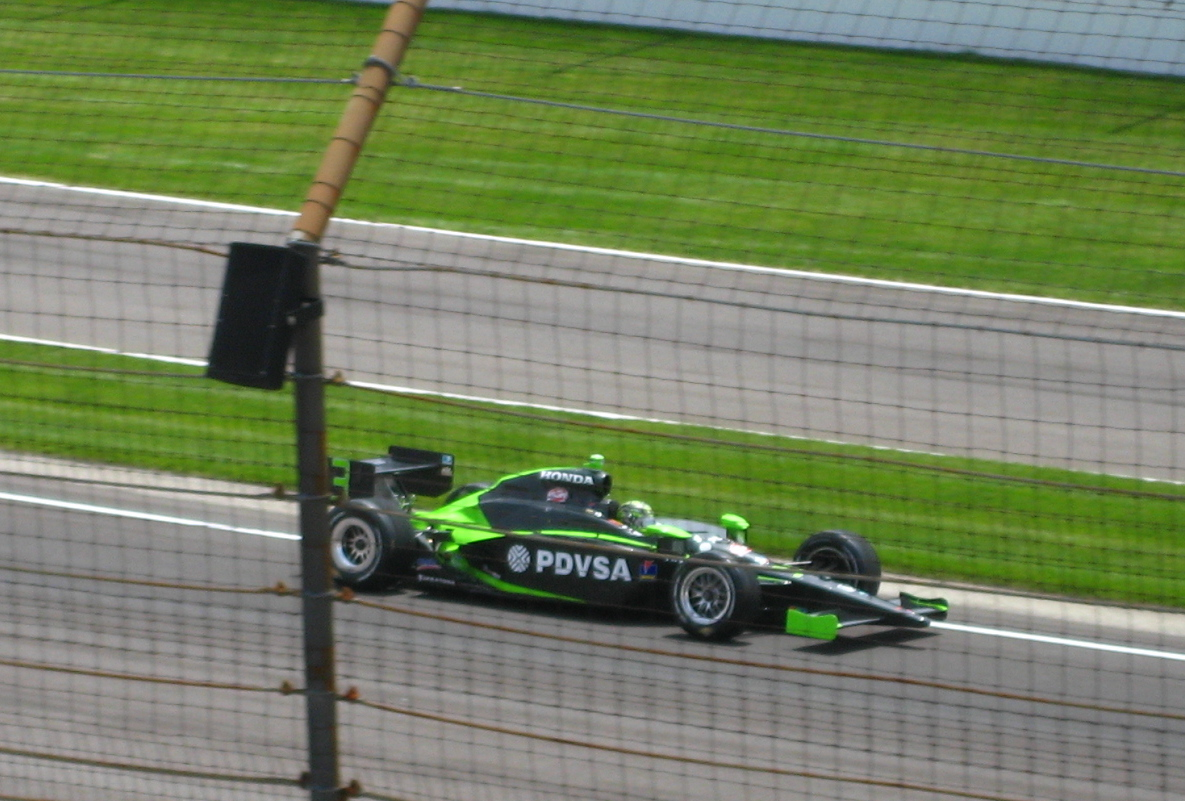
HVM's 2008 IndyCar Series entry driven by E. J. Viso

Dan Clarke had a season plagued with bad luck, but had a bright spot when he finished 2nd at Road America, though he was involved in a high-speed incident with Doornbos, which hurt the Dutchman's championship hopes. Clarke later triggered a multi-car pile-up during free practice at Zolder, and was suspended from competition for the race weekend.

=== HVM in IndyCar ===
In 2008, following American open wheel unification, the team moved to the IRL IndyCar Series with E. J. Viso as its driver. The team also participated in the Long Beach Grand Prix with two more cars under the Minardi Team USA name for Nelson Philippe and Roberto Moreno. Viso finished the 2008 season with seven top-10 finishes and a season-best fourth-place finish at St. Petersburg.

Viso stayed in the team in 2009 and the team aligned itself with the Indy Lights team Michael Crawford Motorsports, renaming it HVM Indy Lights. The Indy Lights team ran its first race at Infineon Raceway in August 2009 with driver Juan Pablo Garcia. Ryan Hunter-Reay tested the team's IndyCar at Sebring two weeks before the 2009 season opener at St. Petersburg and appeared to become the second driver for the team, but signed with Vision Racing instead. Nelson Philippe joined the team as its second driver for the Indianapolis 500. Robert Doornbos returned to HVM in August 2009, piloting the #33 for the remainder of the 2009 season.

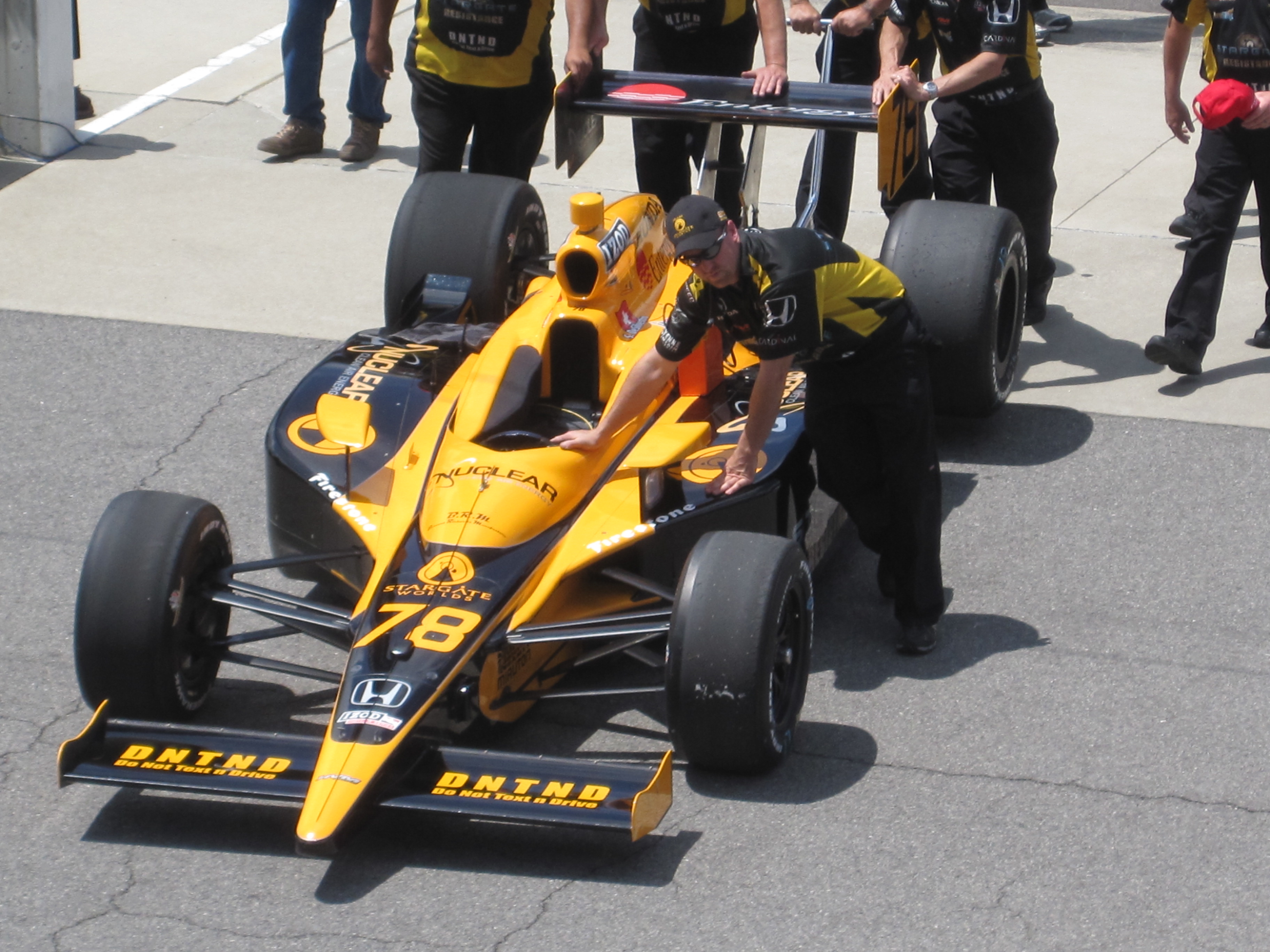
de Silvestro's car at the Indianapolis Motor Speedway in 2010.

For the 2010 season, HVM Racing signed Switzerland's Simona de Silvestro full-time to drive the #78 Team Stargate Worlds entry. de Silvestro was one of five women to compete in the IndyCar Series in 2010, along with Ana Beatriz, Milka Duno, Sarah Fisher, and Danica Patrick, and finished 19th in the overall points standings. She was the second highest-placed female in the points standings, behind Danica Patrick, who finished tenth. de Silvestro's best finish in 2010 came at Mid–Ohio Sports Car Course, where she finished in eighth place.

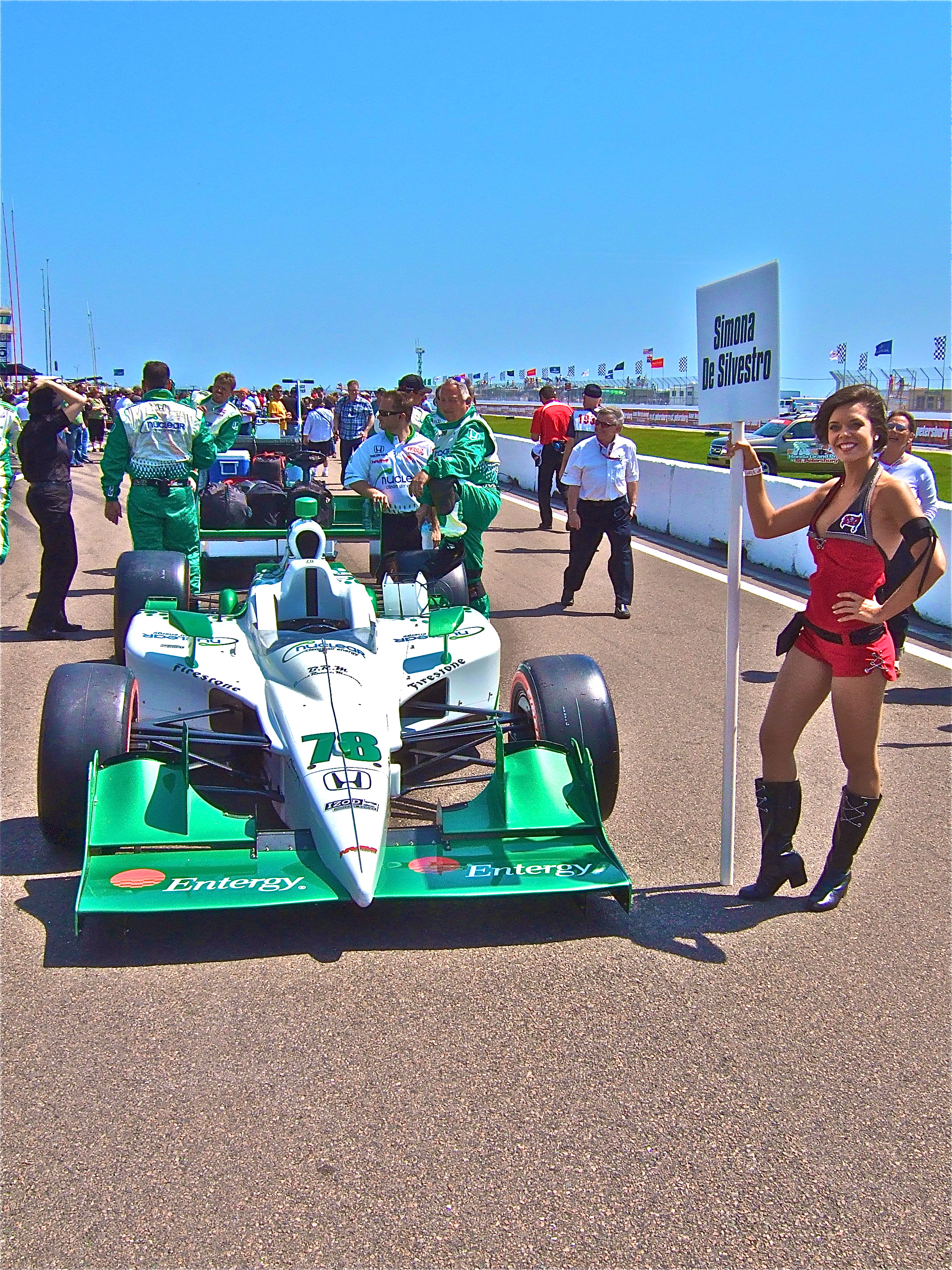
2011 HVM Entergy-sponsored entry on the starting grid for the season opener.

On October 6, 2010, just four days after the 2010 season concluded, HVM Racing announced that they would be bringing de Silvestro back to the team in 2011 in the #78 entry.

On October 30, 2012, de Silvestro signed on to KV Racing Technology for 2013, leaving HVM without a driver or a sponsor. However, former KV driver E. J. Viso had intended to run his own team for 2013, but had little luck. HVM and Viso joined forces with Andretti Autosport to run Viso as a satellite team for Andretti. On 11 November 2015 the team was listed as up for auction officially listing the team as defunct.

== Former drivers ==
- (United States) Gary Bettenhausen (1982–1983, 1996)
- (United States) Tony Bettenhausen Jr. (1986–1993)
- (Denmark) Ronnie Bremer (2005)
- (Canada) Patrick Carpentier (1997)
- (Brazil) Hélio Castroneves (1998)
- (United Kingdom) Dan Clarke (2006–2007)
- (Switzerland) Simona de Silvestro (2010–2012)
- (Italy) Fabrizio del Monte (2005)
- (Mexico) Mario Domínguez (2002–2004, 2007)
- (Netherlands) Robert Doornbos (2007, 2009)
- (Mexico) Roberto González (2003)
- (Japan) Shigeaki Hattori (1999)
- (United States) Ryan Hunter-Reay (2004)
- (Sweden) Stefan Johansson (1992–1996)
- (Mexico) Michel Jourdain Jr. (2000–2001)
- (Mexico) Rodolfo Lavin (2005)
- (Brazil) Roberto Moreno (2003, 2008)
- (France) Nelson Philippe (2006, 2008, 2009)
- (Mexico) Homero Richards (2005)
- (Brazil) Gualter Salles (1999)
- (Brazil) Alex Sperafico (2005)
- (Venezuela) E. J. Viso (2008–2009)
- (Sweden) Björn Wirdheim (2005)

== Results ==
=== CART/CCWS ===
Year	Car	Drivers	Races	Wins	Poles	Fast laps	Points	D.C.
Bettenhausen Motorsports
1986	March-Cosworth	(United States) Tony Bettenhausen Jr.	1	0	0	0	0	NC
1987	March-Cosworth	(United States) Tony Bettenhausen Jr.	9	0	0	0	7	29th
1988	March-Cosworth; Lola-Cosworth	(United States) Tony Bettenhausen Jr.	17	0	0	0	25	17th
1988	Lola-Cosworth	(United States) Dennis Vitolo	1	0	0	0	2	33rd
1989	Lola-Cosworth	(Switzerland) Jean-Pierre Frey	1	0	0	0	0	41st
1989	Lola-Cosworth	(United States) John Paul Jr.	1	0	0	0	0	44th
1989	Lola-Cosworth	(United States) Steve Chassey	2	0	0	0	0	53rd
1989	Lola-Cosworth	(Switzerland) Jon Beekhuis	3	0	0	0	0	36th
1990	Lola-Cosworth	(Italy) Guido Daccò	1	0	0	0	0	29th
1990	Lola-Cosworth; Lola-Buick	(United States) Tony Bettenhausen Jr.	11	0	0	0	4	24th
1991	Penske-Chevrolet	(United States) Tony Bettenhausen Jr.	17	0	0	0	27	14th
1991	Penske-Chevrolet	(Netherlands) Cornelius Euser	1	0	0	0	3	27th
1992	Penske-Chevrolet	(United States) Tony Bettenhausen Jr.	6	0	0	0	6	24th
1992	Penske-Chevrolet	(Sweden) Stefan Johansson	9	0	0	0	47	14th
1993	Penske-Chevrolet	(Sweden) Stefan Johansson	16	0	0	0	43	13th
1993	Penske-Chevrolet	(United States) Tony Bettenhausen Jr.	1	0	0	0	0	47th
1993	Penske-Chevrolet	(United States) Scott Sharp	1	0	0	0	0	48th
1994	Penske-Ilmor	(Sweden) Stefan Johansson	16	0	0	0	57	11th
1994	Penske-Ilmor	(Australia) Gary Brabham	1	0	0	0	0	52nd
1994	Penske-Ilmor	(United States) Robbie Groff	2	0	0	0	0	34th
1995	Penske-Mercedes; Reynard-Cosworth	(Sweden) Stefan Johansson	17	0	0	0	60	13th
1996	Reynard-Mercedes	(Sweden) Stefan Johansson	16	0	0	0	43	15th
1996	Penske-Mercedes	(United States) Gary Bettenhausen	1	0	0	0	0	33rd
1997	Reynard-Mercedes	(Canada) Patrick Carpentier	15	0	0	0	27	17th
1997	Reynard-Mercedes	(Brazil) Roberto Moreno	2	0	0	0	16	19th
1998	Reynard-Mercedes	(Brazil) Hélio Castroneves	19	0	0	0	36	17th
1999	Reynard-Mercedes	(Japan) Shigeaki Hattori	8	0	0	0	0	34th
1999	Reynard-Mercedes	(Brazil) Gualter Salles	7	0	0	0	5	26th
2000	Lola-Mercedes	(Mexico) Michel Jourdain Jr.	20	0	0	0	18	22nd
2001	Lola-Cosworth	(Mexico) Michel Jourdain Jr.	21	0	0	0	30	20th
Herdez Competition
2002	Lola-Cosworth	(Mexico) Mario Domínguez	19	1	0	1	37	18th
2003	Lola-Cosworth	(Brazil) Roberto Moreno	17	0	0	0	67	13th
2003	Lola-Cosworth	(Mexico) Mario Domínguez	18	1	0	0	118	6th
2003	Lola-Cosworth	(Mexico) Roberto González	1	0	0	0	3	24th
2004	Lola-Cosworth	(United States) Ryan Hunter-Reay	14	1	1	1	199	9th
2004	Lola-Cosworth	(Mexico) Mario Domínguez	14	0	0	1	244	5th
HVM Racing
2005	Lola-Cosworth	(Sweden) Björn Wirdheim	11	0	0	0	115	14th
2005	Lola-Cosworth	(Denmark) Ronnie Bremer	5	0	0	0	139	12th
2005	Lola-Cosworth	(Brazil) Alex Sperafico	2	0	0	0	24	20th
2005	Lola-Cosworth	(Mexico) Rodolfo Lavin	6	0	0	0	72	18th
2005	Lola-Cosworth	(Italy) Fabrizio del Monte	1	0	0	0	10	26th
2005	Lola-Cosworth	(Mexico) Homero Richards	1	0	0	0	5	28th
CTE-HVM Racing
2006	Lola-Cosworth	(France) Nelson Philippe	14	1	0	1	231	4th
2006	Lola-Cosworth	(United Kingdom) Dan Clarke	14	0	0	0	175	12th
Minardi Team USA
2007	Panoz DP01-Cosworth	(Netherlands) Robert Doornbos	14	2	0	1	268	**3rd**
2007	Panoz DP01-Cosworth	(United Kingdom) Dan Clarke	13	0	0	1	129	13th
2007	Panoz DP01-Cosworth	(Mexico) Mario Domínguez	1	0	0	0	78	18th

=== IndyCar Series ===
Year	Car	Drivers	Races	Wins	Poles	Fast laps	Points	D.C.
2008	Dallara-Honda; Panoz-Cosworth	(Venezuela) Ernesto Viso	17	0	0	0	286	18th
2009	Dallara-Honda	(Venezuela) Ernesto Viso	17	0	0	0	248	18th
2009	Dallara-Honda	(France) Nelson Philippe	1	0	0	0	16	35th
2009	Dallara-Honda	(Netherlands) Robert Doornbos	5	0	0	0	283	16th
2010	Dallara-Honda	(Switzerland) Simona de Silvestro	17	0	0	0	242	19th
2011	Dallara-Honda	(Switzerland) Simona de Silvestro	15	0	0	1	225	20th
2012	Dallara-Lotus	(Switzerland) Simona de Silvestro	14	0	0	0	182	24th

=== Complete CART / Champ Car World Series results ===
(key) (results in bold indicate pole position) (results in italics indicate fastest lap)

Year	Chassis	Engine	Tyres	Drivers	No.	1	2	3	4	5	6	7	8	9	10	11	12	13	14	15	16	17	18	19	20
Bettenhausen Motorsports
1986						PHX	LBH	INDY	MIL	POR	MEA	CLE	TOR	MCH	POC	MOH	SAN	MCH	ROA	LAG	PHX				
1986	March 86C	Cosworth DFX V8t	G	(United States) Tony Bettenhausen Jr.	16			28																	
1987						LBH	PHX	INDY	MIL	POR	MEA	CLE	TOR	MCH	POC	ROA	MOH	NAZ	LAG	MIA					
1987	March 86C	Cosworth DFX V8t	G	(United States) Tony Bettenhausen Jr.	16	11	15	10	DNQ	13		20	DNQ	11	22	15	25								
1988						PHX	LBH	INDY	MIL	POR	CLE	TOR	MEA	MCH	POC	MOH	ROA	NAZ	LAG	MIA					
1988	March 86C; Lola T87/00	Cosworth DFX V8t	G	(United States) Tony Bettenhausen Jr.	16	6	DNQ	33	19		15	17	8	4	15	16	16	13	26						
1988	Lola T87/00	Cosworth DFX V8t	G	(United States) Dennis Vitolo	16															11					
1989						PHX	LBH	INDY	MIL	DET	POR	CLE	MEA	TOR	MCH	POC	MOH	ROA	NAZ	LAG					
1989	Lola T87/00; Lola T88/00	Cosworth DFX V8t	G	(United States) Tony Bettenhausen Jr.	16			DNQ	DNQ																
1989	Lola T87/00; Lola T88/00	Cosworth DFX V8t	G	(United States) Dennis Vitolo	16					DNQ							DNQ								
1989	Lola T87/00; Lola T88/00	Cosworth DFX V8t	G	(Switzerland) Jean-Pierre Frey	16						15														
1989	Lola T87/00; Lola T88/00	Cosworth DFX V8t	G	(United States) John Paul Jr.	16							16													
1989	Lola T87/00; Lola T88/00	Cosworth DFX V8t	G	(United States) Steve Chassey	16								28		29										
1989	Lola T87/00; Lola T88/00	Cosworth DFX V8t	G	(Canada) Jon Beekhuis	16									13				24		15					
1989	Lola T87/00; Lola T88/00	Cosworth DFX V8t	G	(United States) Michael Greenfield	16											DNQ									
1990						PHX	LBH	INDY	MIL	DET	POR	CLE	MEA	TOR	MCH	DEN	VAN	MOH	ROA	NAZ	LAG				
1990	Lola T88/00	Cosworth DFX V8t	G	(Italy) Guido Daccò	16		23																		
1990	Lola T89/00	Cosworth DFX V8t	G	(United States) Tony Bettenhausen Jr.	16													20	DNS	22					
1990	Lola T89/00	Buick 3300 V6t	G	(United States) Tony Bettenhausen Jr.	16			26	13	16	17	12	10	26	22	24									
1991						SFR	LBH	PHX	INDY	MIL	DET	POR	CLE	MEA	TOR	MCH	DEN	VAN	MOH	ROA	NAZ	LAG			
1991	Penske PC-19	Chevrolet 265A V8t	G	(United States) Tony Bettenhausen Jr.	16	10	12	18	9	12	13	13	13	21	11	5	10	18	18	13	10	16			
1991	Penske PC-19	Chevrolet 265A V8t	G	(Netherlands) Cornelius Euser	90																	10			
1992						SFR	PHX	LBH	INDY	DET	POR	MIL	NHA	TOR	MCH	CLE	ROA	VAN	MOH	NAZ	LAG				
1992	Penske PC-20	Chevrolet 265A V8t	G	(United States) Tony Bettenhausen Jr.	16	13	11	15	DNQ		21	18			9										
1992	Penske PC-20	Chevrolet 265A V8t	G	(Sweden) Stefan Johansson	16					3			10	11		9	19	3	6	21	11				
1993						SFR	PHX	LBH	INDY	MIL	DET	POR	CLE	TOR	MCH	NHA	ROA	VAN	MOH	NAZ	LAG				
1993	Penske PC-22	Chevrolet 265C V8t	G	(Sweden) Stefan Johansson	16	12	21	26	11	25	20	26	4	24	23	14	21	3	26	7	6				
1993	Penske PC-22	Chevrolet 265C V8t	G	(United States) Scott Sharp	33																22				
1993	Penske PC-22	Chevrolet 265C V8t	G	(United States) Tony Bettenhausen Jr.	76				20																
1994						SFR	PHX	LBH	INDY	MIL	DET	POR	CLE	TOR	MCH	MOH	NHA	VAN	ROA	NAZ	LAG				
1994	Penske PC-22	Ilmor 265D V8t	G	(Sweden) Stefan Johansson	16	5	4	10	15	26	22	8	5	14	14	12	23	26	8	5	12				
1994	Penske PC-22	Ilmor 265C V8t	G	(United States) Gary Bettenhausen	61				DNQ																
1994	Penske PC-22	Ilmor 265D V8t; Ilmor 265C V8t	G	(Australia) Gary Brabham	76	24																			
1994	Penske PC-22	Ilmor 265D V8t; Ilmor 265C V8t	G	(United States) Robbie Groff	76			13				13													
1995						MIA	SFR	PHX	LBH	NAZ	INDY	MIL	DET	POR	ROA	TOR	CLE	MCH	MOH	NHA	VAN	LAG			
1995	Penske PC-23	Mercedes-Benz IC108B V8t	G	(Sweden) Stefan Johansson	16	22	17	24	6	3	DNQ	21	11	6	10	14	8	6	23	25	4	14			
1995	Reynard 94i	Ford XB V8t	G	(Sweden) Stefan Johansson	16						16														
1996						MIA	RIO	SFR	LBH	NAZ	500	MIL	DET	POR	CLE	TOR	MCH	MOH	ROA	VAN	LAG				
1996	Reynard 96i	Mercedes-Benz IC108C V8t	G	(Sweden) Stefan Johansson	16	19	23	6	19	19	16	27	7	9	12	17	5	11	4	17	21				
1996	Penske PC-23	Mercedes-Benz IC108B V8t	G	(United States) Gary Bettenhausen	26						21														
1997						MIA	SFR	LBH	NAZ	RIO	GAT	MIL	DET	POR	CLE	TOR	MCH	MOH	ROA	VAN	LAG	FON			
1997	Reynard 97i	Mercedes-Benz IC108D V8t	G	(Canada) Patrick Carpentier	16	9	15	15	12	28	2	8	15	16	12	16	15	15	27			DNS			
1997	Reynard 97i	Mercedes-Benz IC108D V8t	G	(Brazil) Roberto Moreno	16															15	10				
1998						MIA	MOT	LBH	NAZ	RIO	GAT	MIL	DET	POR	CLE	TOR	MCH	MOH	ROA	VAN	LAG	HOU	SFR	FON	
1998	Reynard 98i	Mercedes-Benz IC108E V8t	G	(Brazil) Hélio Castroneves	16	24	11	9	23	23	7	2	12	13	27	10	12	17	26	24	23	24	21	10	
1999						MIA	MOT	LBH	NAZ	RIO	GAT	MIL	POR	CLE	ROA	TOR	MCH	DET	MOH	CHI	VAN	LAG	HOU	SRF	FON
1999	Reynard 98i	Mercedes-Benz IC108E V8t	F	(Japan) Shigeaki Hattori	16	DNS	20	26	Wth		15	23	28			23				17		Wth			
1999	Reynard 98i	Mercedes-Benz IC108E V8t	F	(Brazil) Gualter Salles	16					17														10	
2000						MIA	LBH	RIO	MOT	NAZ	MIL	DET	POR	CLE	TOR	MCH	CHI	MOH	ROA	VAN	LAG	GAT	HOU	SRF	FON
2000	Lola B2K/00	Mercedes-Benz IC108F V8t	F	(Mexico) Michel Jourdain Jr.	16	14	11	15	12	18	18	8	23	22	19	15	11	15	18	23	24	16	18	7	11
2001						MTY	LBH	NAZ	MOT	MIL	DET	POR	CLE	TOR	MCH	CHI	MOH	ROA	VAN	LAU	ROC	HOU	LAG	SRF	FON
2001	Lola B01/00	Ford XF V8t	F	(Mexico) Michel Jourdain Jr.	16	17	13	13	11	13	25	15	25	16	3	23	17	17	6	17	19	25	23	7	16
Herdez Competition
2002						MTY	LBH	MOT	MIL	LAG	POR	CHI	TOR	CLE	VAN	MOH	ROA	MTL	DEN	ROC	MIA	SFR	FON	MXC	
2002	Lola B02/00	Ford XF V8t	B	(Mexico) Mario Domínguez	16	17	14	11	17																
2002	Lola B02/00	Ford XF V8t	B	(Mexico) Mario Domínguez	55					15	10	11	18	17	10	16	8	17	14	13	11	1	16	18	
2003						STP	MTY	LBH	BRH	LAU	MIL	LAG	POR	CLE	TOR	VAN	ROA	MOH	MTL	DEN	MIA	MXC	SFR		
2003	Lola B02/00	Ford XFE V8t	B	(Brazil) Roberto Moreno	4	5	6	17	7	10	19	15	9	18	6	17	7	19	7	16	2		16		
2003	Lola B02/00	Ford XFE V8t	B	(Mexico) Roberto González	4																	10			
2003	Lola B02/00	Ford XFE V8t	B	(Mexico) Mario Domínguez	55	14	13	5	3	2	8	10	10	5	12	10	14	16	5	7	1	3	10		
2004						LBH	MTY	MIL	POR	CLE	TOR	VAN	ROA	DEN	MTL	LAG	LSV	SFR	MXC						
2004	Lola B02/00	Ford XFE V8t	B	(United States) Ryan Hunter-Reay	4	7	8	**1***	12	11	8	8	4	16	18	5	13	5	19						
2004	Lola B02/00	Ford XFE V8t	B	(Mexico) Mario Domínguez	55	5	3	8	17	8	17	6	5	4	3	11	7	3	8						
HVM Racing
2005						LBH	MTY	MIL	POR	CLE	TOR	EDM	SJO	DEN	MTL	LSV	SRF	MXC							
2005	Lola B02/00	Ford XFE V8t	B	(Sweden) Björn Wirdheim	4	12	8	15	9	15	15	15	8	11	13	6									
2005	Lola B02/00	Ford XFE V8t	B	(Italy) Fabrizio del Monte	4												16	DNS							
2005	Lola B02/00	Ford XFE V8t	B	(Mexico) Homero Richards	50													16							
2005	Lola B02/00	Ford XFE V8t	B	(Denmark) Ronnie Bremer	55	7	19	8	8	14															
2005	Lola B02/00	Ford XFE V8t	B	(Brazil) Alex Sperafico	55						8	12													
2005	Lola B02/00	Ford XFE V8t	B	(Mexico) Rodolfo Lavín	55								13	5	14	5	13	15							
CTE-HVM Racing
2006						LBH	HOU	MTY	MIL	POR	CLE	TOR	EDM	SJO	DEN	MTL	ROA	SRF	MXC						
2006	Lola B02/00	Ford XFE V8t	B	(France) Nelson Philippe	4	13	4	17	3	8	10	13	14	4	5	3	14	1*	7						
2006	Lola B02/00	Ford XFE V8t	B	(United Kingdom) Dan Clarke	14	11	16	13	8	6	7	17	9	16	3	4	**6**	17	18						
Minardi Team USA
2007						LSV	LBH	HOU	POR	CLE	MTT	TOR	EDM	SJO	ROA	ZOL	ASN	SFR	MXC						
2007	Panoz DP01	Cosworth XFE V8t	B	(United Kingdom) Dan Clarke	4	15	12	17	6	11	14	12	8	17	2		11	17	17						
2007	Panoz DP01	Cosworth XFE V8t	B	(Mexico) Mario Domínguez	4											17									
2007	Panoz DP01	Cosworth XFE V8t	B	(Netherlands) Robert Doornbos	14	2	13	3	3	2	1	6	11	1	14	7	13	4	16						

=== Complete IndyCar Series results ===
(key)

Year	Chassis	Engine	Tyres	Drivers	No.	1	2	3	4	5	6	7	8	9	10	11	12	13	14	15	16	17	18	19
2008						HMS	STP	MOT	LBH^{1}	KAN	INDY	MIL	TXS	IOW	RIR	WGL	NSH	MOH	EDM	KTY	SNM	DET	CHI	SRF^{2}
2008	Dallara IR-05	Honda HI7R V8	F	(Venezuela) E. J. Viso	33	17	4			14	26	8	14	13	10	10		22	15	13	6	24	23	6
2008	Panoz DP01	Cosworth XFE V8t	B	(Venezuela) E. J. Viso	33				9															
2008	Panoz DP01	Cosworth XFE V8t	B	(France) Nelson Philippe	4				15															
2008	Panoz DP01	Cosworth XFE V8t	B	(Brazil) Roberto Moreno	14				17															
2009						STP	LBH	KAN	INDY	MIL	TXS	IOW	RIR	WGL	TOR	EDM	KTY	MOH	SNM	CHI	MOT	HMS		
2009	Dallara IR-05	Honda HI7R V8	F	(Venezuela) E. J. Viso	13	17	23	21	24	18	24	20	12	7	13	12	15	15	22	17	15	16		
2009	Dallara IR-05	Honda HI7R V8	F	(France) Nelson Philippe	00				25															
2009	Dallara IR-05	Honda HI7R V8	F	(Netherlands) Robert Doornbos	33													14	10	18	16	20		
2010						SAO	STP	ALA	LBH	KAN	INDY	TXS	IOW	WGL	TOR	EDM	MOH	SNM	CHI	KTY	MOT	HMS		
2010	Dallara IR-05	Honda HI7R V8	F	(Switzerland) Simona de Silvestro	78	16	16	21	17	22	14	24	21	24	9	22	8	13	23	25	23	23		
2011						STP	ALA	LBH	SAO	INDY	TXS		MIL	IOW	TOR	EDM	MOH	NHA	SNM	BAL	MOT	KTY	LSV	
2011	Dallara IR-05	Honda HI7R V8	F	(Switzerland) Simona de Silvestro	78	4	9	20	20	31	26	27	25	DNS	10	24	12	16		12	14	25	C^{3}	
2011	Dallara IR-05	Honda HI7R V8	F	(France) Simon Pagenaud	78														15					
2012						STP	ALA	LBH	SAO	INDY	DET	TEX	MIL	IOW	TOR	EDM	MOH	SNM	BAL	FON				
2012	Dallara DW12	Lotus DC00 V6t	F	(Switzerland) Simona de Silvestro	78	24	20	20	24	32	13	DNS	24	14	24	23	23	17	22	26				

1. Run to Champ Car specifications.
2. Non-points-paying, exhibition race.
3. The final race at Las Vegas was canceled due to Dan Wheldon's death.
