= KV Racing Technology =

Auto racing team

(United States) KV Racing Technology
- Principal(s): Kevin Kalkhoven; Jimmy Vasser; James Sullivan
- Base: Indianapolis, Indiana, USA

Career
- Debut: 2003 Grand Prix of St. Petersburg
- Latest race: 2016 GoPro Grand Prix of Sonoma
- Races competed: 227
- Drivers' Championships: 0
- Indy 500 victories: 1
- Race victories: 6
- Pole positions: 2

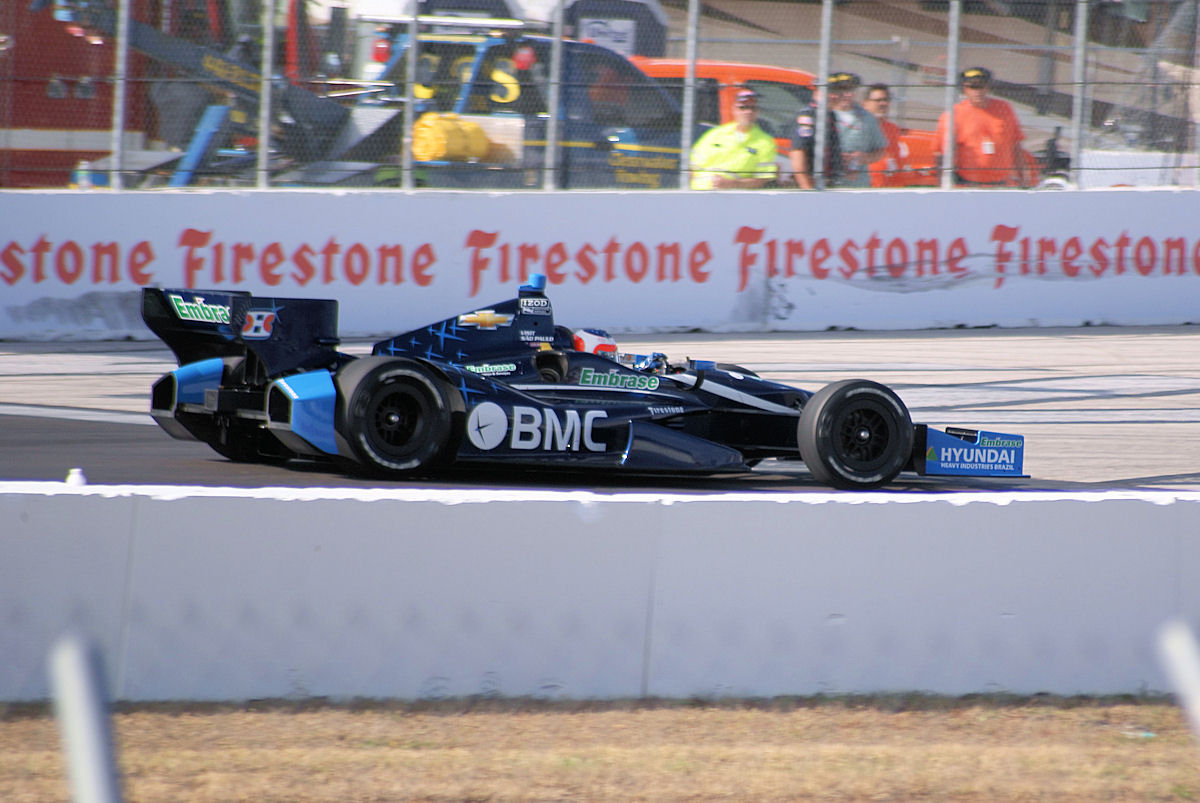
KV Racing's No. 8 car at the 2012 Honda Grand Prix of St. Petersburg

KV Racing Technology was an auto racing team that last competed in the IndyCar Series. The team was originally formed as PK Racing before the 2003 season by Australian businessman Kevin Kalkhoven and former Formula One team manager Craig Pollock from the remnants of the PacWest team.

The team has also sponsored drivers in the Atlantic Championship.

== Champ Car ==
In its first season, the team fielded one car and employed several drivers including Patrick Lemarié, Bryan Herta, Max Papis and Mika Salo, the latter of which scored the team's best result of third late in the season.

For 2004, the team was significantly revamped. It was renamed to PKV Racing, as businessman Dan Pettit and veteran driver Jimmy Vasser replaced Pollock as co-owners. The team also expanded to field two cars for Vasser and rookie Roberto González. Vasser scored the team's best finish and second podium with a second place at Toronto, but the season was otherwise lackluster. In 2005, PKV replaced Gonzalez with former series champion Cristiano da Matta, who took the team's first win at Portland. Da Matta finished 11th in the championship, while Vasser scored two third-place finishes and was sixth overall.

For 2006, the team fielded full season entries for veteran Oriol Servià and rookie Katherine Legge. Vasser retired from racing after driving a third car at Long Beach. Servià scored a third place at Cleveland and finished 11th in the championship, while Legge struggled and finished 16th overall. The team's 2007 driver lineup was Neel Jani and Tristan Gommendy. Mario Domínguez subbed for Gommendy at Edmonton, and Servià replaced Gommendy for the final two races due to sponsorship issues. The team's best results were Jani's pair of second places finishes at Toronto and San Jose.

== IndyCar ==
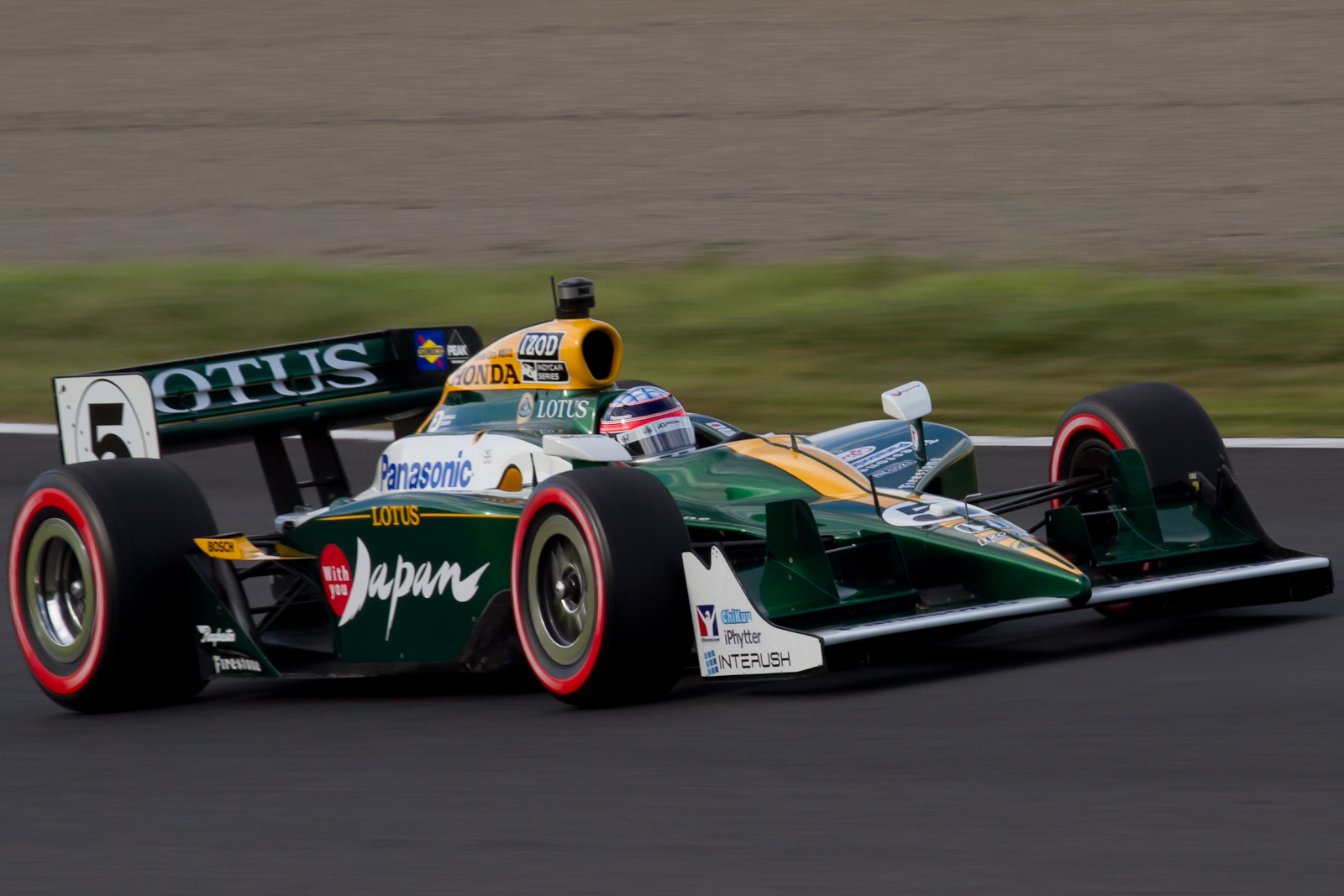
Takuma Sato at the 2011 Indy Japan: The Final.

The team switched to the IndyCar Series following the unification of American open wheel racing in 2008. Dan Pettit ceased his ownership role in the team and the team changed its name to KV Racing Technology. Australian businessmen Craig Gore and John Fish brought their Team Australia branding from Walker Racing along with driver Will Power to partner Servià.

Power won the Champ Car finale, the 2008 Toyota Grand Prix of Long Beach a race which also counted towards the IndyCar Series championship. Vasser also competed in the race in what was his true final race. In the 2008 Indianapolis 500, the first for the team and both drivers, Power qualified 23rd and finished 13th, while Servià qualified 25th and finished 11th.

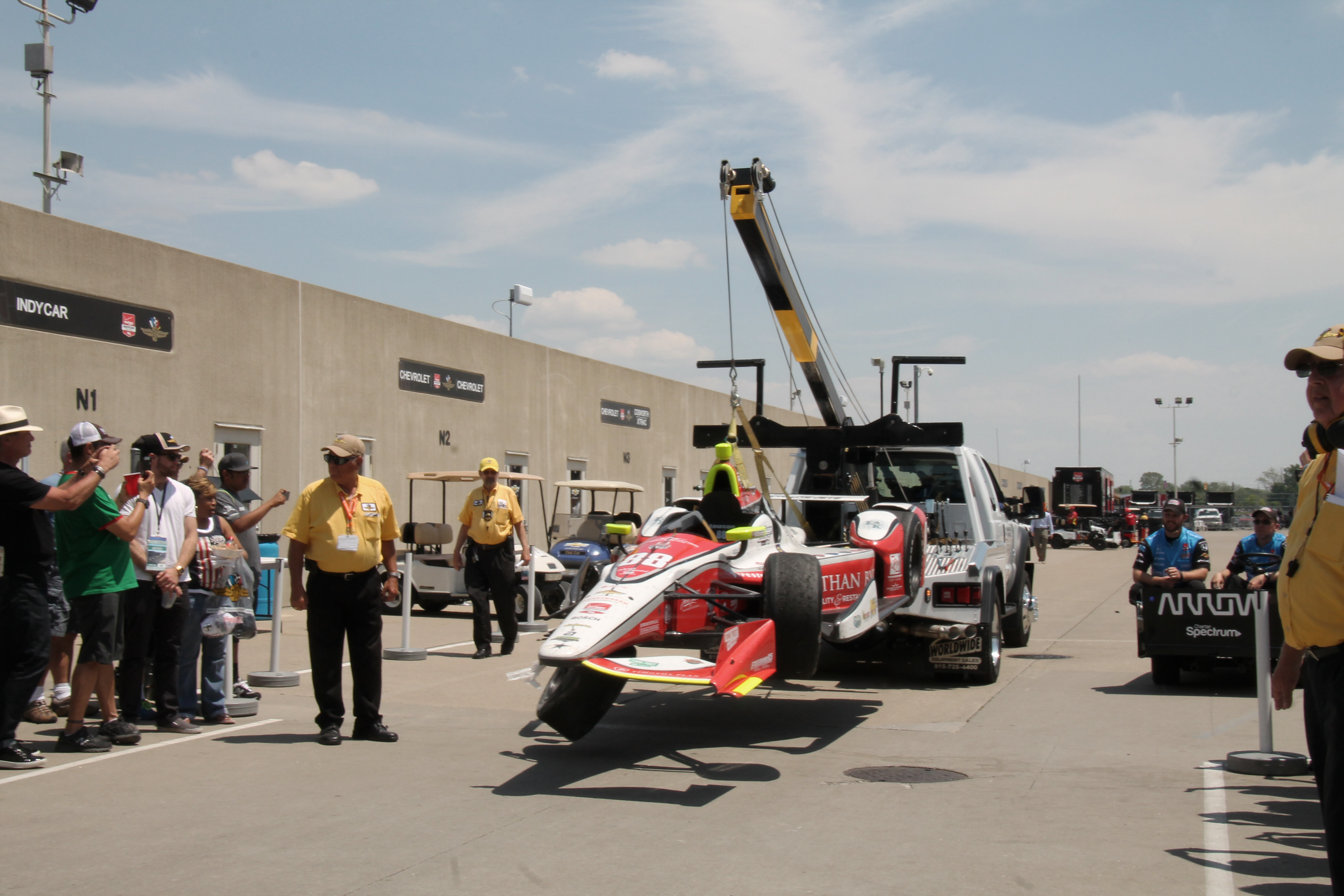
Bryan Clauson's damaged No. 88 Jonathan Byrd's Racing car, run in conjunction with KV Racing Technology. returning to the garage at the 2015 Indianapolis 500.

In 2009, the team ran a full-time program for Brazilian Mario Moraes. Paul Tracy also made five starts for the team: Indy 500, Watkins Glen, Edmonton, Toronto, and Mid-Ohio. Townsend Bell drove a third car for the team at the Indy 500. In 2010 the team ran full-time programs for Takuma Sato, E. J. Viso, and Mario Moraes, plus a part-time program for Paul Tracy. James Rossiter tested for the team at Barber. For 2011, Sato and Viso returned to the team, as well as gaining technical support from Lotus Cars, re-branding the team as KV Racing Technology – Lotus, or KVRT-Lotus. The team added Tony Kanaan in a third car, the #82, as a tribute to the late Formula One and Indy 500 champion Jim Clark.

In the 2011 Indianapolis 500, Sato and Viso were the first two cars retired from the race due to separate accidents.

For 2012, Sato would leave KV for Rahal Letterman Lanigan Racing, replaced by former Formula 1 driver Rubens Barichello. The team also announced that it would be partnering with Chevrolet. Although he was winless, Kanaan would finish 9th that season with a best finish of 2nd at Milwaukee. Both Viso and Barichello would struggle that year for results, with both drivers leaving the team at the end of the year.

On 30 October 2012, HVM Racing's Simona de Silvestro joined KV for the 2013 IndyCar Series season.

Kanaan's win in the 2013 Indianapolis 500 was the first for KV, while de Silvestro scored her first podium at Houston. Kanaan departed KV to drive for Chip Ganassi Racing for the 2014 IndyCar Series season, while de Silvestro also departed the team at season's end. They were replaced by Dragon Racing teammates Sébastien Bourdais and Sebastián Saavedra for 2014.

The team had moderate success in 2014, with Saavedra claiming his first pole at the Grand Prix of Indianapolis and Bourdais taking his first IndyCar win at Honda Indy Toronto. Though Bourdais finished 10th in standings, a lack of results saw Saavedra's release from the team. His replacement for 2015 would be former GP2 driver Stefano Coletti. Coletti would struggle heavily adapting to IndyCar, with a best finish of 8th at the 2015 Grand Prix of Indianapolis. Bourdais would take his second win at the Chevrolet Dual in Detroit. KV would release Coletti at the end of the season, reducing to only Bourdais' No. 11 for the 2016 season. The team would take its second consecutive win in Detroit.

Despite the win, funding for the team was in doubt as Kalkhoven wished to sell the team's equipment. In response, Bourdais departed KVSH for Dale Coyne Racing. Without proper funding, Kalkhoven and Vasser attempted to sell the team to Indy Lights owner Trevor Carlin, but the deal fell through. On 16 February 2017, Vasser and Kalkhoven released statements confirming the end of KV Racing Technology, and the sale of equipment and technical data to Juncos Racing.

In February 2018, former KVSH co-owners Jimmy Vasser and James "Sulli" Sullivan formed a partnership with Dale Coyne to field Sébastien Bourdais for the 2018 IndyCar Series as Dale Coyne Racing with Vasser-Sullivan.

== Drivers ==
- (France) Patrick Lemarié (2003)
- (Finland) Mika Salo (2003)
- (Italy) Max Papis (2003)
- (United States) Bryan Herta (2003)
- (United States) Jimmy Vasser (2004–2006, 2008)
- (Mexico) Roberto González (2004)
- (Brazil) Cristiano da Matta (2005)
- (Mexico) Jorge Goeters (2005)
- (United Kingdom) Katherine Legge (2006)
- (Spain) Oriol Servià (2006–2008)
- (Switzerland) Neel Jani (2007)
- (France) Tristan Gommendy (2007)
- (Australia) Will Power (2008)
- (United States) Townsend Bell (2009, 2014)
- (Brazil) Mario Moraes (2009–2010)
- (Canada) Paul Tracy (2009–2010)
- (Japan) Takuma Sato (2010–2011)
- (Venezuela) E. J. Viso (2010–2012)
- (Brazil) Tony Kanaan (2011–2013)
- (Brazil) Rubens Barrichello (2012)
- (Switzerland) Simona de Silvestro (2013)
- (Colombia) Sebastián Saavedra (2014)
- (France) Sébastien Bourdais (2014–2016)
- (Monaco) Stefano Coletti (2015)
- (United States) Bryan Clauson (2015)
- (United Kingdom) Stefan Wilson (2016)

== Racing results ==
=== Complete Champ Car World Series results ===
(key) (results in bold indicate pole position) (results in italics indicate fastest lap)

| Year | Chassis | Engine | Tyres | Drivers | No. | 1 | 2 | 3 | 4 | 5 | 6 | 7 | 8 | 9 | 10 | 11 | 12 | 13 | 14 | 15 | 16 | 17 | 18 | Pts Pos | Pts |
PK Racing
| 2003 | | | | | | STP | MTY | LBH | BRH | LAU | MIL | LAG | POR | CLE | TOR | VAN | ROA | MDO | MTL | DEN | MIA | MEX | SFR | | |
| 2003 | Lola B02/00 | Ford XFE V8t | B | (France) Patrick Lemarié | 27 | 10 | 10 | 13 | 11 | 19 | 18 | | | | | | | | | | | | | 21st | 8 |
| 2003 | Lola B02/00 | Ford XFE V8t | B | (United States) Bryan Herta | 27 | | | | | | | 11 | | | | | | | | | | | | 25th | 2 |
| 2003 | Lola B02/00 | Ford XFE V8t | B | (Italy) Max Papis | 27 | | | | | | | | 15 | 12 | 16 | 9 | 4 | 9 | 9 | | | | | 17th | 25 |
| 2003 | Lola B02/00 | Ford XFE V8t | B | (Finland) Mika Salo | 27 | | | | | | | | | | | | | | | 14 | 3 | 5 | 11 | 16th | 26 |
PKV Racing
| 2004 | | | | | | LBH | MTY | MIL | POR | CLE | TOR | VAN | ROA | DEN | MTL | LAG | LSV | SFR | MXC | | | | | | |
| 2004 | Lola B02/00 | Ford XFE V8t | B | (United States) Jimmy Vasser | 12 | 16 | 12 | 4 | 8 | 5 | 2 | 10 | 8 | 17 | 8 | 17 | 5 | 12 | 5 | | | | | 8th | 201 |
| 2004 | Lola B02/00 | Ford XFE V8t | B | (Mexico) Roberto González | 21 | 14 | 9 | 12 | 10 | 7 | 13 | 13 | 16 | 12 | 10 | 14 | 10 | 11 | 12 | | | | | 15th | 136 |
| 2005 | | | | | | LBH | MTY | MIL | POR | CLE | TOR | EDM | SJO | DEN | MTL | LSV | SRF | MXC | | | | | | | |
| 2005 | Lola B02/00 | Ford XFE V8t | B | (United States) Jimmy Vasser | 12 | 9 | 14 | **5** | 6 | 6 | 4 | 11 | 11 | 15 | 7 | 3 | 3 | 6 | | | | | | 6th | 217 |
| 2005 | Lola B02/00 | Ford XFE V8t | B | (Brazil) Cristiano da Matta | 21 | 10 | 6 | 11 | 1* | 16 | 17 | 17 | 10 | 18 | 6 | 12 | 19 | 14 | | | | | | 11th | 139 |
| 2005 | Lola B02/00 | Ford XFE V8t | B | (Mexico) Jorge Goeters | 52 | | 18 | | | | | | | | | | | | | | | | | 29th | 3 |
| 2006 | | | | | | LBH | HOU | MTY | MIL | POR | CLE | TOR | EDM | SJO | DEN | MTL | ROA | SRF | MXC | | | | | | |
| 2006 | Lola B02/00 | Ford XFE V8t | B | (Spain) Oriol Servià | 6 | 18 | 12 | 8 | 5 | 10 | 3 | 12 | 4 | 8 | 15 | 16 | 4 | 13 | 6 | | | | | 11th | 197 |
| 2006 | Lola B02/00 | Ford XFE V8t | B | (United States) Jimmy Vasser | 12 | 14 | | | | | | | | | | | | | | | | | | 24th | 7 |
| 2006 | Lola B02/00 | Ford XFE V8t | B | (United Kingdom) Katherine Legge | 20 | 8 | 14 | 14 | 6 | 13 | 8 | 14 | 13 | 12 | 9 | 13 | 16 | 15 | 16 | | | | | 16th | 133 |
| 2007 | | | | | | LSV | LBH | HOU | POR | CLE | MTT | TOR | EDM | SJO | ROA | ZOL | ASN | SFR | MXC | | | | | | |
| 2007 | Panoz DP01 | Cosworth XFE V8t | B | (Switzerland) Neel Jani | 21 | 10 | 7 | 15 | 12 | 3 | 6 | 2 | 9 | 2 | 10 | 8 | 5 | 8 | 9 | | | | | 9th | 231 |
| 2007 | Panoz DP01 | Cosworth XFE V8t | B | (France) Tristan Gommendy | 22 | 5 | 11 | 13 | 7 | 13 | **12** | 15 | | 8 | 7 | 16 | 4 | | | | | | | 12th | 140 |
| 2007 | Panoz DP01 | Cosworth XFE V8t | B | (Mexico) Mario Domínguez | 22 | | | | | | | | 17 | | | | | | | | | | | 18th | 78 |
| 2007 | Panoz DP01 | Cosworth XFE V8t | B | (Spain) Oriol Servià | 22 | | | | | | | | | | | | | 14 | 3 | | | | | 6th | 237 |

=== Complete IndyCar Series results ===
(key)

| Year | Chassis | Engine | Tyres | Drivers | No. | 1 | 2 | 3 | 4 | 5 | 6 | 7 | 8 | 9 | 10 | 11 | 12 | 13 | 14 | 15 | 16 | 17 | 18 | 19 | Pts Pos | Pts |
|---|---|---|---|---|---|---|---|---|---|---|---|---|---|---|---|---|---|---|---|---|---|---|---|---|---|---|
| 2008 | | | | | | HMS | STP | MOT | LBH^{1} | KAN | INDY | MIL | TXS | IOW | RIR | WGL | NSH | MDO | EDM | KTY | SNM | DET | CHI | SRF^{2} | | |
| 2008 | Dallara IR-05 | Honda HI7R V8 | F | (Spain) Oriol Servià | 5 | 12 | 7 | | | 11 | 11 | 6 | 26 | 16 | 5 | 23 | 16 | 5 | 5 | 12 | 15 | 4 | 17 | 5 | 9th | **358** |
| 2008 | Panoz DP01 | Cosworth XFE V8t | B | (Spain) Oriol Servià | 5 | | | | 5 | | | | | | | | | | | | | | | | 9th | **358** |
| 2008 | Dallara IR-05 | Honda HI7R V8 | F | (Australia) Will Power | 8 | 25 | 8 | | | 27 | 13 | 14 | 13 | 9 | 25 | 15 | 11 | 4 | 22 | 26 | 25 | 8 | 5 | **22** | 12th | **331** |
| 2008 | Panoz DP01 | Cosworth XFE V8t | B | (Australia) Will Power | 8 | | | | 1* | | | | | | | | | | | | | | | | 12th | **331** |
| 2008 | Panoz DP01 | Cosworth XFE V8t | B | (United States) Jimmy Vasser | 12 | | | | 10 | | | | | | | | | | | | | | | | NC | — |
| 2009 | | | | | | STP | LBH | KAN | INDY | MIL | TXS | IOW | RIR | WGL | TOR | EDM | KTY | MDO | SNM | CHI | MOT | HMS | | | | |
| 2009 | Dallara IR-05 | Honda HI7R V8 | F | (Brazil) Mario Moraes | 5 | 21 | 19 | 11 | 33 | 9 | 10 | 17 | 16 | 14 | 11 | 23 | 18 | | 4 | 3 | 5 | 7 | | | 14th | **304** |
| 2009 | Dallara IR-05 | Honda HI7R V8 | F | (Canada) Paul Tracy | 5 | | | | | | | | | | | | | 7 | | | | | | | 23rd | **113** |
| 2009 | Dallara IR-05 | Honda HI7R V8 | F | (Canada) Paul Tracy | 15 | | | | 9 | | | | | 20 | 19 | 6 | | | | | | | | | 23rd | **113** |
| 2009 | Dallara IR-05 | Honda HI7R V8 | F | (United States) Townsend Bell | 8 | | | | 4 | | | | | | | | | | | | | | | | 32nd | **32** |
| 2010 | | | | | | SAO | STP | ALA | LBH | KAN | INDY | TXS | IOW | WGL | TOR | EDM | MDO | SNM | CHI | KTY | MOT | HMS | | | | |
| 2010 | Dallara IR-05 | Honda HI7R V8 | F | (Japan) Takuma Sato | 5 | 22 | 22 | 25 | 18 | 24 | 20 | 25 | 19 | 15 | 25 | 9 | 25 | 18 | 26 | 27 | 12 | 18 | | | 21st | **214** |
| 2010 | Dallara IR-05 | Honda HI7R V8 | F | (Venezuela) E. J. Viso | 8 | 12 | 17 | 16 | 15 | 27 | 25 | 11 | 3 | 11 | 19 | 8 | 26 | 19 | 27 | 26 | 15 | 19 | | | 17th | **262** |
| 2010 | Dallara IR-05 | Honda HI7R V8 | F | (Canada) Paul Tracy | 15 | | | | | | DNQ | | | | 13 | 6 | | | | | | | | | 27th | **91** |
| 2010 | Dallara IR-05 | Honda HI7R V8 | F | (Brazil) Mario Moraes | 32 | 24 | 21 | 13 | 6 | 7 | 31 | 21 | 25 | 5 | 14 | 7 | 12 | 11 | 17 | 18 | 24 | 27 | | | 15th | **287** |
| 2011 | | | | | | STP | ALA | LBH | SAO | INDY | TXS | | MIL | IOW | TOR | EDM | MDO | NHA | SNM | BAL | MOT | KTY | LSV | | | |
| 2011 | Dallara IR-05 | Honda HI7R V8 | F | (Japan) Takuma Sato | 5 | 5 | 16 | 21 | 8 | 33 | 5 | 12 | 8 | **19** | 20 | **21** | 4 | 7 | 18 | 18 | 10 | 15 | C^{3} | | 13th | **297** |
| 2011 | Dallara IR-05 | Honda HI7R V8 | F | (Venezuela) E. J. Viso | 59 | 19 | 23 | 25 | 13 | 32 | 7 | 10 | 20 | 17 | 9 | 20 | 15 | 12 | 9 | 15 | 21 | 23 | C^{3} | | 18th | **241** |
| 2011 | Dallara IR-05 | Honda HI7R V8 | F | (Brazil) Tony Kanaan | 82 | 3 | 6 | 8 | 22 | 4 | 11 | **5** | 19 | 2 | 26 | 4 | 5 | 22 | 28 | 3 | 17 | 17 | **C**^{3} | | 5th | **366** |
| 2012 | | | F | | | STP | ALA | LBH | SAO | INDY | DET | TXS | MIL | IOW | TOR | EDM | MDO | SNM | BAL | FON | | | | | | |
| 2012 | Dallara DW12 | Chevrolet IndyCar V6t | F | (Venezuela) E. J. Viso | 5 | 8 | 18 | 12 | 9 | 18 | 18 | 19 | 5 | 24 | 20 | 16 | 20 | 16 | 9 | 25 | | | | | 20th | **244** |
| 2012 | Dallara DW12 | Chevrolet IndyCar V6t | F | (Brazil) Rubens Barrichello | 8 | 17 | 8 | 9 | 10 | 11 | 25 | DNS | 10 | 7 | 11 | 13 | 15 | 4 | 5 | 22 | | | | | 12th | **289** |
| 2012 | Dallara DW12 | Chevrolet IndyCar V6t | F | (Brazil) Tony Kanaan | 11 | 25 | 21 | 4 | 13 | 3 | 6 | 11 | 2 | 3 | 4 | 18 | 6 | 10 | 20 | 18 | | | | | 9th | **351** |
| 2013 | | | | | | STP | ALA | LBH | SAO | INDY | DET | | TXS | MIL | IOW | POC | TOR | | MDO | SNM | BAL | HOU | | FON | | |
| 2013 | Dallara DW12 | Chevrolet IndyCar V6t | F | (Brazil) Tony Kanaan | 11 | 4 | 13 | 20 | 21 | 1 | 13 | 12 | 3 | 10 | 3 | 13 | 5 | 24 | 24 | 13 | 15 | 21 | 24 | 3 | 11th | **397** |
| 2013 | Dallara DW12 | Chevrolet IndyCar V6t | F | (Switzerland) Simona de Silvestro | 78 | 6 | 18 | 9 | 8 | 17 | 16 | 24 | 16 | 24 | 21 | 11 | 10 | 14 | 11 | 9 | 5 | 2 | 10 | 8 | 13th | **362** |
| 2014 | | | | | | STP | LBH | ALA | IMS | INDY | DET | | TXS | HOU | | POC | IOW | TOR | | MDO | MIL | SNM | FON | | | |
| 2014 | Dallara DW12 | Chevrolet IndyCar V6t | F | (United States) Townsend Bell | 6 | | | | | 25 | | | | | | | | | | | | | | | 32nd | **22** |
| 2014 | Dallara DW12 | Chevrolet IndyCar V6t | F | (France) Sébastien Bourdais | 11 | 13 | 14 | 15 | 4 | 7 | 13 | 20 | 20 | 4 | 5 | 16 | 19 | **1*** | 9 | **2** | 12 | 11 | 18 | | 10th | **461** |
| 2014 | Dallara DW12 | Chevrolet IndyCar V6t | F | (Colombia) Sebastián Saavedra | 17 | 11 | 9 | 18 | **23** | 15 | 14 | 22 | 14 | 15 | 17 | 15 | 17 | 19 | 21 | 20 | 18 | 16 | 17 | | 21st | **291** |
| 2014 | Dallara DW12 | Chevrolet IndyCar V6t | F | (Australia) James Davison | 33 | | | | | 16 | | | | | | | | | | | | | | | 29th | **34** |
| 2015 | | | | | | STP | NOL | LBH | ALA | IMS | INDY | DET | | TXS | TOR | FON | MIL | IOW | MDO | POC | SNM | | | | | |
| 2015 | Dallara DW12 | Chevrolet IndyCar V6t | F | (Monaco) Stefano Coletti | 4 | 20 | 17 | 23 | 19 | 8 | 25 | 15 | 16 | 19 | 23 | 11 | 20 | 20 | 19 | 24 | 17 | | | | 19th | **203** |
| 2015 | Dallara DW12 | Chevrolet IndyCar V6t | F | (France) Sébastien Bourdais | 11 | 6 | 21 | 6 | 8 | 4 | 11 | 14 | 1 | 14 | 5 | 14 | 1* | 9 | 17 | 23 | 20 | | | | 10th | **406** |
| 2016 | | | | | | STP | PHX | LBH | ALA | IMS | INDY | DET | | ROA | IOW | TOR | MDO | POC | TXS | WGL | SNM | | | | | |
| 2016 | Dallara DW12 | Chevrolet IndyCar V6t | F | (France) Sébastien Bourdais | 11 | 21 | 8 | 9 | 16 | 24 | 9 | 1 | 8 | 18 | 8 | 7 | 20 | 5 | 10 | 5 | 10 | | | | 14th | **404** |
| 2016 | Dallara DW12 | Chevrolet IndyCar V6t | F | (United Kingdom) Stefan Wilson | 25 | | | | | | 28 | | | | | | | | | | | | | | 34th | **14** |

1. Run to Champ Car specifications.
2. Non-points-paying, exhibition race.
3. The final race at Las Vegas was cancelled due to Dan Wheldon's death.
