= 2008 Honda Grand Prix of St. Petersburg =

(United States) 2008 St. Petersburg
Race details
- 2nd round of the 2008 IndyCar Series season
- Date: April 6, 2008
- Official name: Honda Grand Prix of St. Petersburg
- Location: Streets of St. Petersburg
- Course: Temporary Street Circuit; 1.800 mi / 2.897 km
- Distance: 83 laps 149.400 mi / 240.436 km
- Weather: 78 °F (26 °C), Rain & clouds

Pole position
- Driver: (Brazil) Tony Kanaan ( (United States) Andretti Green Racing)
- Time: 1:02.5322

Fastest lap
- Driver: (Brazil) Tony Kanaan ( (United States) Andretti Green Racing)
- Time: 1:03.8874 (on lap 76 of 83)

Podium
- First: (United States) Graham Rahal ( (United States) Newman/Haas/Lanigan Racing)
- Second: (Brazil) Hélio Castroneves ( (United States) Penske Racing)
- Third: (Brazil) Tony Kanaan ( (United States) Andretti Green Racing)

Chronology
Previous	Next
2007	2009

The 2008 Honda Grand Prix of St. Petersburg was the second round of the 2008 IndyCar Series season and took place on April 6, 2008 at the 1.8-mile (2.9 km) temporary street and airport circuit on the streets of St. Petersburg, Florida. The race was a time-limited race due to rain, with the race falling some seventeen laps short of full race distance. The race was won by Graham Rahal on his IndyCar Series debut, having missed the first round at Homestead-Miami Speedway, due to a lack of spare parts for his #06 Newman/Haas/Lanigan Racing machine.

At 19 years, 93 days old, Rahal became the youngest driver ever to win an Indy-style race, as well as the youngest winner in IndyCar Series history breaking Marco Andretti's record of 19 years, 167 days from the 2006 IndyCar Series season. He also became the fourth driver to win an IndyCar Series race in his first start, joining Buzz Calkins, Juan Pablo Montoya and Scott Dixon. Rahal's record was later broken by Colton Herta in 2019.

== Qualifying ==
- All cars are split into two groups of thirteen, with the fastest six from each group going through to the "Top 12" session. In this session, the fastest six runners will progress to the "Firestone Fast Six". The fastest driver in this final session will claim pole, with the rest of the runners lining up in session order, regardless of qualifying times. (Fast Six from 1-6, Top 12 from 7-12 and Round 1 from 13-26) Drivers can use as many laps as they want in the timed sessions.

=== Round 1 ===
==== Group 1 ====
Pos	No.	Driver	Team	Time	Speed (mph)
1	8	(Australia) Will Power (R)	KV Racing	1:02.6560	103.422
2	11	(Brazil) Tony Kanaan	Andretti Green Racing	1:02.7752	103.225
3	06	(United States) Graham Rahal (R)	Newman/Haas/Lanigan Racing	1:02.9581	102.926
4	34	(France) Franck Perera (R)	Conquest Racing	1:03.1453	102.620
5	14	(United Kingdom) Darren Manning	A. J. Foyt Enterprises	1:03.1822	102.561
6	17	(United States) Ryan Hunter-Reay	Rahal Letterman Racing	1:03.1923	102.544
7	27	(Japan) Hideki Mutoh (R)	Andretti Green Racing	1:03.2757	102.409
8	36	(Brazil) Enrique Bernoldi (R)	Conquest Racing	1:03.4568	102.117
9	7	(United States) Danica Patrick	Andretti Green Racing	1:03.5766	101.924
10	20	(United States) Ed Carpenter	Vision Racing	1:03.8007	101.566
11	19	(Brazil) Mario Moraes (R)	Dale Coyne Racing	1:04.1590	100.999
12	23	(United States) Townsend Bell	Dreyer & Reinbold Racing	1:04.3880	100.640
13	25	(Canada) Marty Roth	Roth Racing	1:07.7041	95.711

==== Group 2 ====
Pos	No.	Driver	Team	Time	Speed (mph)
1	02	(United Kingdom) Justin Wilson (R)	Newman/Haas/Lanigan Racing	1:02.7341	103.293
2	6	(Australia) Ryan Briscoe	Penske Racing	1:02.8910	103.035
3	26	(United States) Marco Andretti	Andretti Green Racing	1:03.0131	102.836
4	3	(Brazil) Hélio Castroneves	Penske Racing	1:03.1560	102.603
5	5	(Spain) Oriol Servià (R)	KV Racing	1:03.1653	102.588
6	10	(United Kingdom) Dan Wheldon	Chip Ganassi Racing	1:03.2095	102.516
7	9	(New Zealand) Scott Dixon	Chip Ganassi Racing	1:03.2365	102.472
8	33	(Venezuela) E. J. Viso (R)	HVM Racing	1:03.3067	102.359
9	15	(United States) Buddy Rice	Dreyer & Reinbold Racing	1:03.3591	102.274
10	4	(Brazil) Vítor Meira	Panther Racing	1:03.4480	102.131
11	24	(United Kingdom) Jay Howard (R)	Roth Racing	1:03.7447	101.656
12	2	(United States) A. J. Foyt IV	Vision Racing	1:04.4996	100.466
13	18	(Brazil) Bruno Junqueira	Dale Coyne Racing	1:09.3851	93.392

=== Round 2 (Top 12) ===
Pos	No.	Driver	Team	Time	Speed (mph)
1	8	(Australia) Will Power (R)	KV Racing	1:02.1355	104.288
2	11	(Brazil) Tony Kanaan	Andretti Green Racing	1:02.4960	103.687
3	6	(Australia) Ryan Briscoe	Penske Racing	1:02.5031	103.675
4	02	(United Kingdom) Justin Wilson (R)	Newman/Haas/Lanigan Racing	1:02.5393	103.615
5	17	(United States) Ryan Hunter-Reay	Rahal Letterman Racing	1:02.6864	103.372
6	3	(Brazil) Hélio Castroneves	Penske Racing	1:02.6869	103.371
7	5	(Spain) Oriol Servià (R)	KV Racing	1:02.7427	103.279
8	10	(United Kingdom) Dan Wheldon	Chip Ganassi Racing	1:02.7964	103.191
9	06	(United States) Graham Rahal (R)	Newman/Haas/Lanigan Racing	1:02.8122	103.165
10	34	(France) Franck Perera (R)	Conquest Racing	1:02.8749	103.062
11	14	(United Kingdom) Darren Manning	A. J. Foyt Enterprises	1:03.0136	102.835
12	26	(United States) Marco Andretti	Andretti Green Racing	1:03.2443	102.460

=== Round 3 (Firestone Fast Six) ===
Pos	No.	Driver	Team	Time	Speed (mph)
1	11	(Brazil) Tony Kanaan	Andretti Green Racing	1:02.5322	103.627
2	8	(Australia) Will Power (R)	KV Racing	1:02.6096	103.499
3	02	(United Kingdom) Justin Wilson (R)	Newman/Haas/Lanigan Racing	1:02.6426	103.444
4	3	(Brazil) Hélio Castroneves	Penske Racing	1:02.6462	103.438
5	6	(Australia) Ryan Briscoe	Penske Racing	1:02.7071	103.338
6	17	(United States) Ryan Hunter-Reay	Rahal Letterman Racing	1:03.0077	102.845

=== Grid ===
Pos	No.	Driver	Team	Time	Speed (mph)
1	11	(Brazil) Tony Kanaan	Andretti Green Racing	1:02.5322	103.627
2	8	(Australia) Will Power (R)	KV Racing	1:02.6096	103.499
3	02	(United Kingdom) Justin Wilson (R)	Newman/Haas/Lanigan Racing	1:02.6426	103.444
4	3	(Brazil) Hélio Castroneves	Penske Racing	1:02.6462	103.438
5	6	(Australia) Ryan Briscoe	Penske Racing	1:02.7071	103.338
6	17	(United States) Ryan Hunter-Reay	Rahal Letterman Racing	1:03.0077	102.845
7	5	(Spain) Oriol Servià (R)	KV Racing	1:02.7427	103.279
8	10	(United Kingdom) Dan Wheldon	Chip Ganassi Racing	1:02.7964	103.191
9	06	(United States) Graham Rahal (R)	Newman/Haas/Lanigan Racing	1:02.8122	103.165
10	34	(France) Franck Perera (R)	Conquest Racing	1:02.8749	103.062
11	14	(United Kingdom) Darren Manning	A. J. Foyt Enterprises	1:03.0136	102.835
12	26	(United States) Marco Andretti	Andretti Green Racing	1:03.2443	102.460
13	9	(New Zealand) Scott Dixon	Chip Ganassi Racing	1:03.2365	102.472
14	27	(Japan) Hideki Mutoh (R)	Andretti Green Racing	1:03.2757	102.409
15	33	(Venezuela) E. J. Viso (R)	HVM Racing	1:03.3067	102.359
16	15	(United States) Buddy Rice	Dreyer & Reinbold Racing	1:03.3591	102.274
17	4	(Brazil) Vítor Meira	Panther Racing	1:03.4480	102.131
18	36	(Brazil) Enrique Bernoldi (R)	Conquest Racing	1:03.4568	102.117
19	7	(United States) Danica Patrick	Andretti Green Racing	1:03.5766	101.924
20	24	(United Kingdom) Jay Howard (R)	Roth Racing	1:03.7447	101.656
21	20	(United States) Ed Carpenter	Vision Racing	1:03.8007	101.566
22	19	(Brazil) Mario Moraes (R)	Dale Coyne Racing	1:04.1590	100.999
23	23	(United States) Townsend Bell	Dreyer & Reinbold Racing	1:04.3880	100.640
24	2	(United States) A. J. Foyt IV	Vision Racing	1:04.4996	100.466
25	25	(Canada) Marty Roth	Roth Racing	1:07.7041	95.711
26	18	(Brazil) Bruno Junqueira	Dale Coyne Racing	1:09.3851	93.392

- Before the race, Marty Roth had a problem with his car and did not start. Bruno Junqueira therefore moved up to 25th on the grid.

== Race ==
Pos	No.	Driver	Team	Laps	Time/Retired	Grid	Laps Led	Points
1	06	(United States) Graham Rahal (R)	Newman/Haas/Lanigan Racing	83	2:00:43.5562	9	19	53
2	3	(Brazil) Hélio Castroneves	Penske Racing	83	+3.5192	4	0	40
3	11	(Brazil) Tony Kanaan	Andretti Green Racing	83	+5.5134	1	15	35
4	33	(Venezuela) E. J. Viso (R)	HVM Racing	83	+8.8575	15	12	32
5	36	(Brazil) Enrique Bernoldi (R)	Conquest Racing	83	+9.6360	18	3	30
6	27	(Japan) Hideki Mutoh (R)	Andretti Green Racing	83	+10.0071	14	0	28
7	5	(Spain) Oriol Servià (R)	KV Racing	83	+11.2871	7	0	26
8	8	(Australia) Will Power (R)	KV Racing	83	+12.8493	2	0	24
9	02	(United Kingdom) Justin Wilson (R)	Newman/Haas/Lanigan Racing	83	+14.3598	3	18	22
10	7	(United States) Danica Patrick	Andretti Green Racing	83	+16.7298	19	0	20
11	2	(United States) A. J. Foyt IV	Vision Racing	83	+20.8319	24	0	19
12	10	(United Kingdom) Dan Wheldon	Target Chip Ganassi	83	+24.7800	8	0	18
13	14	(United Kingdom) Darren Manning	A. J. Foyt Enterprises	83	+45.8601	11	0	17
14	24	(United Kingdom) Jay Howard (R)	Roth Racing	82	+1 Lap	20	0	16
15	15	(United States) Buddy Rice	Dreyer & Reinbold Racing	82	+1 Lap	16	0	15
16	19	(Brazil) Mario Moraes (R)	Dale Coyne Racing	82	+1 Lap	22	0	14
17	17	(United States) Ryan Hunter-Reay	Rahal Letterman Racing	81	+2 Laps	6	4	13
18	20	(United States) Ed Carpenter	Vision Racing	80	Accident	21	0	12
19	4	(Brazil) Vítor Meira	Panther Racing	75	Collision	17	1	12
20	34	(France) Franck Perera (R)	Conquest Racing	75	Collision	10	0	12
21	23	(United States) Townsend Bell	Dreyer & Reinbold Racing	75	Collision	23	0	12
22	9	(New Zealand) Scott Dixon	Target Chip Ganassi	74	Mechanical	13	0	12
23	6	(Australia) Ryan Briscoe	Penske Racing	56	Accident	5	11	12
24	18	(Brazil) Bruno Junqueira	Dale Coyne Racing	44	Mechanical	25	0	12
25	26	(United States) Marco Andretti	Andretti Green Racing	41	Mechanical	12	0	10
DNS	25	(Canada) Marty Roth	Roth Racing	0		26	0	5

== Notes ==
- The race began under caution, due to the rain that was lying on the street circuit. The race would finally go green on lap 10.
- Due to a two-hour time limit, the race was curtailed after 83 of the original 100 laps.
