= E. J. Viso =

Venezuelan racing driver

E.J. Viso
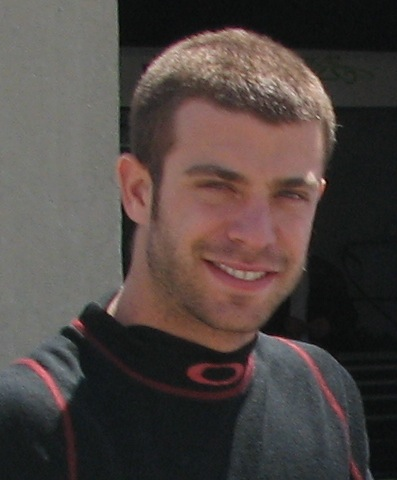
- Viso at the Indianapolis Motor Speedway, May 2009
- Nationality: (Venezuela) Venezuelan
- Born: Ernesto José Viso Lossada; March 19, 1985 (age 41) Caracas, Republic of Venezuela

Stadium Super Trucks career
- Categorisation: FIA Platinum
- Years active: 2014–2016
- Car number: 5
- Starts: 27
- Wins: 7
- Poles: 5
- Best finish: 5th in 2014

Previous series
- 2001 2002 2002 2003–04 2005–07 2008-13: Skip Barber Formula Dodge; British Formula Renault; FR 2000 Eurocup; British F3 Championship; GP2 Series; IndyCar Series

Championship titles
- 2003: National Class British F3 Champion

Ernesto José Viso Lossada (born March 19, 1985) is a Venezuelan professional racing driver. He has raced in the 2005 and 2006 GP2 Series seasons, and has also driven the third car for Spyker MF1 Racing. In 2007 he competed in the GP2 Series for Racing Engineering. In 2014 he made his season debut for the Stadium Super Trucks in the Long Beach Grand Prix. He most recently drove for Andretti Autosport in the IndyCar Series.

== Career ==
=== Early racing ===
Born in Caracas, Viso spent time in his early career in both Europe and America. He attended Rolling Hills Prep high school in California. Viso's career started in karting back in 1993, where he stayed until 2001 when he moved to US Barber Formula Dodge East, becoming champion with confidence. He also raced in the Italian Formula Renault Winter Series at the end of that year, moving to British Formula Renault for 2002. In 2002, he also drove in one race of Formula Renault 2000 Eurocup, and at the end of the year in the British Formula 3 Winter Series.

2003 saw a move to British Formula 3, where he raced in the B-Class and became champion after a controversial collision with his main rival during the final race of the season. He then moved to the main class in 2004, racing part of the season for the P1 team, his performances attracting the attention of F3000 team Durango who lured him to the series for the remainder of the season.

=== GP2 ===
In 2005, Viso raced in the inaugural season of the GP2 Series for the BCN Competicion team, alongside Hiroki Yoshimoto. In 2006, he again raced in the GP2 Series for the iSport team. He won the San Marino Sunday race and the Spain Sunday race. He also drove the third Spyker MF1 Team car in the Friday practice sessions of the Brazilian Grand Prix.

Before the 2007 French Grand Prix, it was confirmed that Viso would replace the underperforming Sérgio Jimenez at Racing Engineering. His race ended on the first lap in a spectacular collision with Michael Ammermüller and Kazuki Nakajima in which his car somersaulted over the barriers at tremendous speed, smashing through an advertising hoarding and narrowly missing a bridge (as luck would have it, hitting the board saved him from clouting the bridge and probably more severe injuries), leaving him only a severe concussion and painful arm. This crash was very similar to the one of Marco Campos that happened on the same track in 1995, leading to Campos's death. Campos died of severe head trauma after hitting his head on the concrete barrier. Viso was only inches away from the same fate. For the British round, he was replaced by Filipe Albuquerque. Viso took part in the following race meeting, but was then replaced by Marcos Martinez.

=== IndyCar Series ===
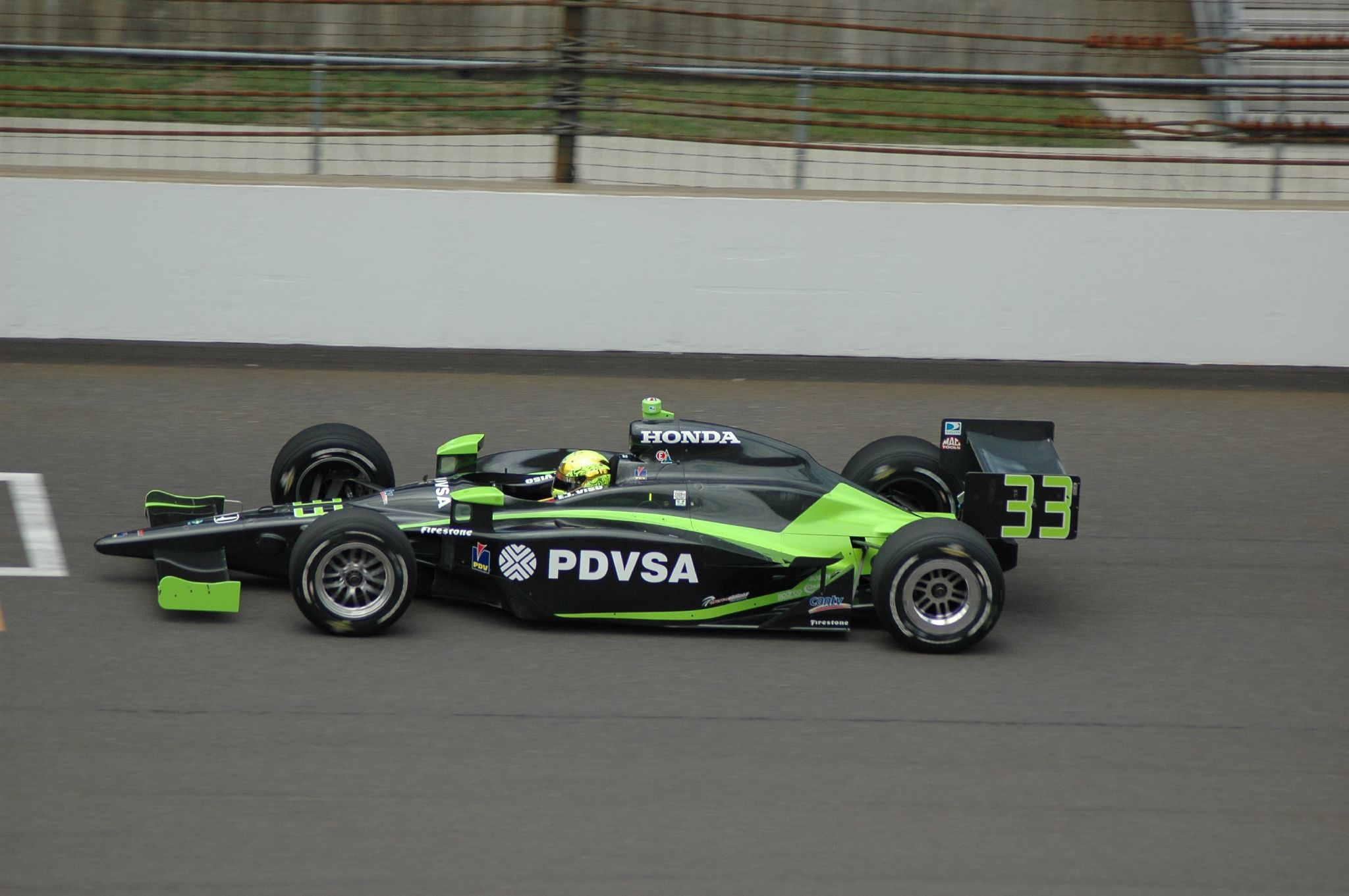
Viso in 2008

Viso competed in the newly united IndyCar Series in 2008 for HVM Racing. He made his first series start in the first oval race of his career on March 29. His next start, at St. Petersburg, was a superb performance ending with a fourth-place finish. At Milwaukee, he ended with an eighth place. Shortly after the Watkins Glen race (in which he finished tenth but forced Vítor Meira off the track, causing Meira to run back onto the track to confront Viso on the next lap) he was diagnosed with the mumps and was forced to withdraw from the next race. Viso finished eighteenth overall in the 2008 series and has signed a contract to drive for HVM in 2009. On February 21, 2010 KV Racing confirmed that Viso would drive the No. 8 car for the team for the entire 2010 season.

For the 2011 IndyCar campaign, Viso remained with KV Racing. He showed flashes of speed, particularly in Brazil where he was in contention for a win. He remained one of the more accident-prone drivers in the series, which led to questions about his seat for 2012 . Viso finished eighteenth in the IZOD IndyCar Series championship on the strength of four top-ten finishes with a season best seventh place showing in Texas Race No. 2.

For 2013, Viso remained in the IndyCar Series with Andretti Autosport, in the No. 5 with sponsorship from oil company PDVSA, recording a best finish of fourth at Milwaukee and finishing fifteenth in the final points standings.

In 2014, Viso failed to find an IndyCar drive. In May, he was called in by Andretti Autosport to take part in practice for the Indianapolis 500 while James Hinchcliffe recovered from a concussion suffered at the Grand Prix of Indianapolis. Viso drove in the first four days of practice, and led the speed charts on the third day, before Hinchcliffe was cleared to drive in time for Fast Friday practice.

=== Stadium Super Trucks ===
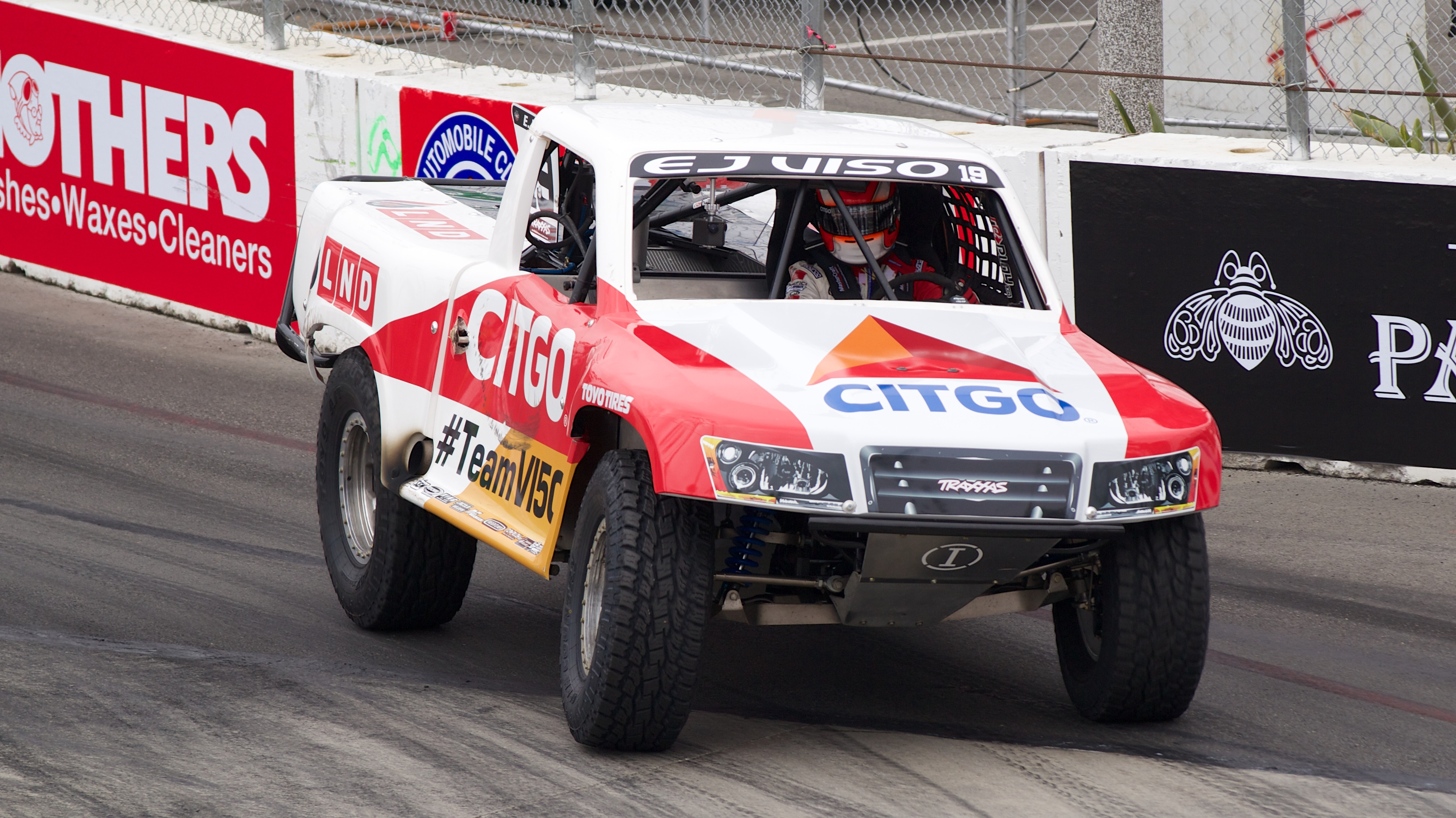
Viso in the 2014 Stadium Super Trucks race at Long Beach

In 2014, Viso made his Stadium Super Trucks series debut in Long Beach, California where he finished second after a last lap battle with series founder Robby Gordon. On May 30, Viso got his first ever win in an SST on only his second ever series appearance at the Detroit Belle Isle Grand Prix, where he finished 1st ahead of Robby Gordon in an eventful last lap finish. Viso also captured his second win a day later beating 16-year-old Scotty Steele. Viso swept all three Detroit events on June 1, and won race 1 at Coronado. He finished fifth in the season standings.

== Driving style ==
During his stay in IndyCar, Viso was known for his very aggressive driving style, which resulted in a large retirement rate due to contact, and repeated criticism from his fellow competitors.

== Personal life ==
During his racing career, Viso rode unicycles as a hobby.

== Racing record ==
=== Complete Formula Renault UK results ===
(key) (Races in bold indicate pole position) (Races in italics indicate fastest lap)

Year	Entrant	1	2	3	4	5	6	7	8	9	10	11	12	13	DC	Points
2002	Manor Motorsport	BRH; 18	OUL; 18	THR; Ret	SIL; 16	THR; Ret	BRH; Ret	CRO; 20	SNE; 17	SNE; 20	KNO; 23	BRH; 10	DON; 9	DON; Ret	20th	40

=== Complete British Formula 3 International Series results ===
(key) (Races in bold indicate pole position) (Races in italics indicate fastest lap)

Year	Entrant	Chassis	Engine	Class	1	2	3	4	5	6	7	8	9	10	11	12	13	14	15	16	17	18	19	20	21	22	23	24	25	DC	Points
2003	P1 Motorsport	Dallara F301	Mugen-Honda	Scholarship	**DON**; **1** Ret	**DON**; **2** Ret	SNE; 1; 10	SNE; 2; 12	CRO; 1; 16	CRO; 2; 14	KNO; 1; 13	KNO; 2; 9	SIL; 1; 22	SIL; 2; 26	**CAS**; **1**; 12	**CAS**; **2**; 11	OUL; 1 Ret	**OUL**; **2**; 13	ROC; 1; 13	ROC; 2; 7	**THR**; **1**; 9	**THR**; **2**; 8	SPA; 1; 20	SPA; 2; 16	**DON**; **1**; 13	**DON**; **2**; 9	**BRH**; **1**; 13	**BRH**; **2** Ret		1st	323
2004	P1 Motorsport	Dallara F304	Mugen-Honda	Championship	DON; 1; 5	DON; 2; 5	SIL; 1; 7	SIL; 2 C	CRO; 1 Ret	CRO; 2 Ret	**KNO**; **1**; 1	KNO; 2; 6	SNE; 1; 12	SNE; 2; 5	SNE; 3; 9	CAS; 1; 4	CAS; 2 Ret	DON; 1	DON; 2	OUL; 1	OUL; 2	SIL; 1	SIL; 2	THR; 1	THR; 2	SPA; 1	SPA; 2	BRH; 1	BRH; 2	11th	66

=== Complete International Formula 3000 results ===
(key) (Races in bold indicate pole position; races in italics indicate fastest lap.)

Year	Entrant	1	2	3	4	5	6	7	8	9	10	DC	Points
2004	Durango Corse	IMO	CAT	MON	NUR	MAG; 8	SIL; 11	HOC; 7	HUN; 6	SPA; 10	MNZ; 8	12th	7

=== Complete GP2 Series results ===
(key) (Races in bold indicate pole position) (Races in italics indicate fastest lap)

Year	Entrant	1	2	3	4	5	6	7	8	9	10	11	12	13	14	15	16	17	18	19	20	21	22	23	DC	Points
2005	BCN Competición	IMO; FEA; 10	IMO; SPR; DNS	CAT; FEA; Ret	CAT; SPR; Ret	MON; FEA; DSQ	NÜR; FEA; Ret	NÜR; SPR; 11	MAG; FEA; 11	MAG; SPR; 8	SIL; FEA; 15	SIL; SPR; 13	HOC; FEA; DSQ	HOC; SPR; 12	HUN; FEA; 6	HUN; SPR; Ret	IST; FEA; 14	IST; SPR; 12	MNZ; FEA; Ret	MNZ; SPR; Ret	SPA; FEA; 2	SPA; SPR; 3	BHR; FEA; 8	BHR; SPR; 2	11th	21
2006	iSport International	VAL; FEA; 8	VAL; SPR; 2	IMO; FEA; 6	IMO; SPR; 1	NÜR; FEA; 6	NÜR; SPR; 11	CAT; FEA; 8	CAT; SPR; 1	MON; FEA; Ret	SIL; FEA; Ret	SIL; SPR; 8	MAG; FEA; 10	MAG; SPR; Ret	HOC; FEA; 4	HOC; SPR; 4	HUN; FEA; 4	HUN; SPR; 4	IST; FEA; Ret	IST; SPR; 13	MNZ; FEA; Ret	MNZ; SPR; 10			6th	42
2007	Racing Engineering	BHR; FEA	BHR; SPR	CAT; FEA	CAT; SPR	MON; FEA	MAG; FEA; Ret	MAG; SPR; DNS	SIL; FEA	SIL; SPR	NÜR; FEA; 14	NÜR; SPR; 8	HUN; FEA	HUN; SPR	IST; FEA	IST; SPR	MNZ; FEA	MNZ; SPR	SPA; FEA	SPA; SPR	VAL; FEA	VAL; SPR			29th	0

=== Complete Formula One participations ===
(key)

Year	Entrant	Chassis	Engine	1	2	3	4	5	6	7	8	9	10	11	12	13	14	15	16	17	18	WDC	Points
2006	Spyker MF1 Racing	Spyker M16	Toyota V8	BHR	MAL	AUS	SMR	EUR	ESP	MON	GBR	CAN	USA	FRA	GER	HUN	TUR	ITA	CHN	JPN	BRA; TD	–	–

=== American open–wheel racing results ===
(key) (Races in bold indicate pole position)

==== IndyCar Series ====
Year	Team	No.	Chassis	Engine	1	2	3	4	5	6	7	8	9	10	11	12	13	14	15	16	17	18	19	Rank	Points	Ref
2008	HVM Racing	33	Dallara IR-05	Honda	HMS; 17	STP; 4	MOT^{1} DNP		KAN; 14	INDY; 26	MIL; 8	TXS; 14	IOW; 13	RIR; 10	WGL; 10	NSH^{3} Wth	MDO; 22	EDM; 15	KTY; 13	SNM; 6	DET; 24	CHI; 23	SRF^{2} 6	18th	286	
2008	HVM Racing	33	Panoz DP01	Cosworth XFE				LBH^{1} 9																18th	286	
2009	HVM Racing	13	Dallara IR-05	Honda	STP; 17	LBH; 23	KAN; 21	INDY; 24	MIL; 18	TXS; 24	IOW; 20	RIR; 12	WGL; 7	TOR; 13	EDM; 12	KTY; 15	MDO; 15	SNM; 22	CHI; 17	MOT; 15	HMS; 16			18th	248	
2010	KV Racing Technology	8	Dallara IR-05	Honda	SAO; 12	STP; 17	ALA; 16	LBH; 15	KAN; 27	INDY; 25	TXS; 11	IOW; 3	WGL; 11	TOR; 19	EDM; 8	MDO; 26	SNM; 19	CHI; 27	KTY; 26	MOT; 15	HMS; 19			17th	262	
2011	KV Racing Technology-Lotus	59	Dallara IR-05	Honda	STP; 19	ALA; 23	LBH; 25	SAO; 13	INDY; 32	TXS; 7	TXS; 10	MIL; 20	IOW; 17	TOR; 9	EDM; 20	MDO; 15	NHM; 12	SNM; 9	BAL; 15	MOT; 21	KTY; 23	LVS^{4} C		18th	241	
2012	KV Racing Technology	5	Dallara DW12	Chevrolet	STP; 8	ALA; 18	LBH; 12	SAO; 9	INDY; 18	DET; 18	TXS; 19	MIL; 5	IOW; 24	TOR; 20	EDM; 16	MDO; 20	SNM; 16	BAL; 9	FON; 25					20th	244	
2013	Andretti Autosport	5	Dallara DW12	Chevrolet	STP; 7	ALA; 12	LBH; 22	SAO; 6	INDY; 18	DET; 17	DET; 17	TXS; 10	MIL; 4	IOW; 10	POC; 21	TOR; 14	TOR; 5	MDO; 17	SNM; 14	BAL; 13	HOU; 9	HOU; 16	FON^{5}	15th	340	

^{1} Run on same day.
^{2} Non-points-paying, exhibition race.
^{3} Pulled out of race after contracting mumps
^{4} The Las Vegas Indy 300 was abandoned after Dan Wheldon died from injuries sustained in a 15-car crash on lap 11.
^{5} Missed race after falling ill due to eating bad oysters. Replaced by Carlos Muñoz.

Years	Teams	Races	Poles	Wins	Podiums (Non-win)	Top 10s (Non-podium)	Indianapolis 500 Wins	Championships
6	3	99	0	0	1	23	0	0

==== Indianapolis 500 ====
Year	Chassis	Engine	Start	Finish	Team
2008	Dallara	Honda	26	26	HVM Racing
2009	Dallara	Honda	29	24	HVM Racing
2010	Dallara	Honda	19	25	KV Racing Technology
2011	Dallara	Honda	18	32	KV Racing Technology
2012	Dallara	Chevrolet	9	18	KV Racing Technology
2013	Dallara	Chevrolet	4	18	Andretti Autosport/ HVM Racing

=== Complete American Le Mans Series results ===
Year	Entrant	Class	Chassis	Engine	Tyres	1	2	3	4	5	6	7	8	9	10	Rank	Points
2012	CORE Autosport	PC	Oreca FLM09	Chevrolet LS3 6.2 L V8	**M**	SEB ovr:12 cls:1	LNB	MON	LIM	MOS	MID	AME	BAL	VIR	PET	15th	24

=== Complete WeatherTech SportsCar Championship ===
Year	Entrant	Class	Chassis	Engine	1	2	3	4	5	6	7	8	9	10	11	Rank	Points
2014	Starworks Motorsport	P	Riley Mk XXVI DP	Dinan (BMW) 5.0 L V8	DAY; 17	SEB	LBH	LGA	DET	WGL	MOS	IMS	ELK	COA	PET	55th	15

=== Stadium Super Trucks ===
(key) (Bold – Pole position. Italics – Fastest qualifier. * – Most laps led.)

Stadium Super Trucks results
Year	1	2	3	4	5	6	7	8	9	10	11	12	13	14	15	16	17	18	19	20	21	22	SSTC	Pts	Ref
2014	STP	STP	LBH; 2*	IMS	IMS	DET; 1*	DET; 1*	DET; 1	AUS; 15	TOR	TOR	OCF; 3	OCF; 10	CSS; 5	**LVV**; 10*	**LVV**; 10							5th	280	
2015	**ADE**; 1*	ADE; 4	ADE; 10	STP; 4*	STP; 5	LBH; 1*	DET; 2*	DET; 1	DET; 5	AUS; 7	TOR; 8	**TOR**; 9	OCF; Rpl^{†}	OCF; Rpl^{†}	OCF; Rpl^{†}	SRF	SRF	SRF	SRF	SYD	LVV	LVV	6th	344	
2016	ADE	ADE	ADE	STP	STP	LBH	LBH	DET; 8	DET; C^{1}	DET; 2	**TOW**; 10*	TOW; 7	TOW; 1*	TOR	TOR	CLT	CLT	OCF	OCF	SRF	SRF	SRF	14th	99	
^{†} – "Mad" Mike Whiddett drove Viso's truck, with all points earned by Whiddett going to Viso

^{1} The race was abandoned after Matt Mingay suffered serious injuries in a crash on lap three.
