= 2010 Cafés do Brasil Indy 300 =

(United States) 2010 Homestead–Miami
Race details
- 17th round of the 2010 IndyCar Series season
- Date: October 2, 2010
- Official name: Cafés do Brasil Indy 300
- Location: Homestead–Miami Speedway, Homestead, Florida
- Course: Permanent racing facility 1.485 mi / 2.390 km
- Distance: 200 laps 297.000 mi / 477.975 km
- Weather: 87 °F (31 °C), clear skies

Pole position
- Driver: (United Kingdom) Dario Franchitti (Chip Ganassi Racing)
- Time: 50.1532 (2-lap)

Fastest lap
- Driver: (United States) Marco Andretti (Andretti Autosport)
- Time: 25.2248 (on lap 3 of 200)

Podium
- First: (New Zealand) Scott Dixon (Chip Ganassi Racing)
- Second: (United States) Danica Patrick (Andretti Autosport)
- Third: (Brazil) Tony Kanaan (Andretti Autosport)

The 2010 Cafés do Brasil Indy 300 was an IndyCar motor race held in front of approximately 14,000 people on October 2, 2010, at the Homestead–Miami Speedway in Homestead, Florida. It was the 17th and final showdown of the 2010 IndyCar Series, the final annual edition of the event in the IndyCar Series, and the 15th anniversary of the running of the race (including five years in the Championship Auto Racing Teams (CART) schedule). Chip Ganassi Racing driver Scott Dixon, who started from the second position, won the 200-lap race. Andretti Autosport's Danica Patrick finished second and her teammate Tony Kanaan took third.

Heading into the race, only Dixon's teammate Dario Franchitti and Team Penske driver Will Power remained in contention to win the Drivers' Championship. Franchitti won the pole position by posting the fastest two-lap effort in qualifying. He led the first 42 laps until Ryan Briscoe passed him on lap 43 but retook the position on the next lap. Franchitti led for a total of 128 laps, more than any other driver. He later opted to drive conservatively after Power crashed in an unsuccessful attempt to lap Ryan Hunter-Reay on the 135th lap. Dixon took the lead on lap 152, and led a total of 47 laps en route to his third victory of the season — the 24th of his career. Patrick, one of five women drivers competing in the event, held off her teammate Kanaan in the final five laps to finish second by 0.0011 seconds.

There were five cautions and an event record-breaking 18 lead changes among seven drivers during the race. The result of the race won Franchitti the third Drivers' Championship of his career and the fourth for Chip Ganassi Racing from finishing eighth. Power's non-finish put him five points behind Franchitti in second place, while Dixon overtook Hélio Castroneves for third, and Briscoe finished the season in fifth place.

== Background ==
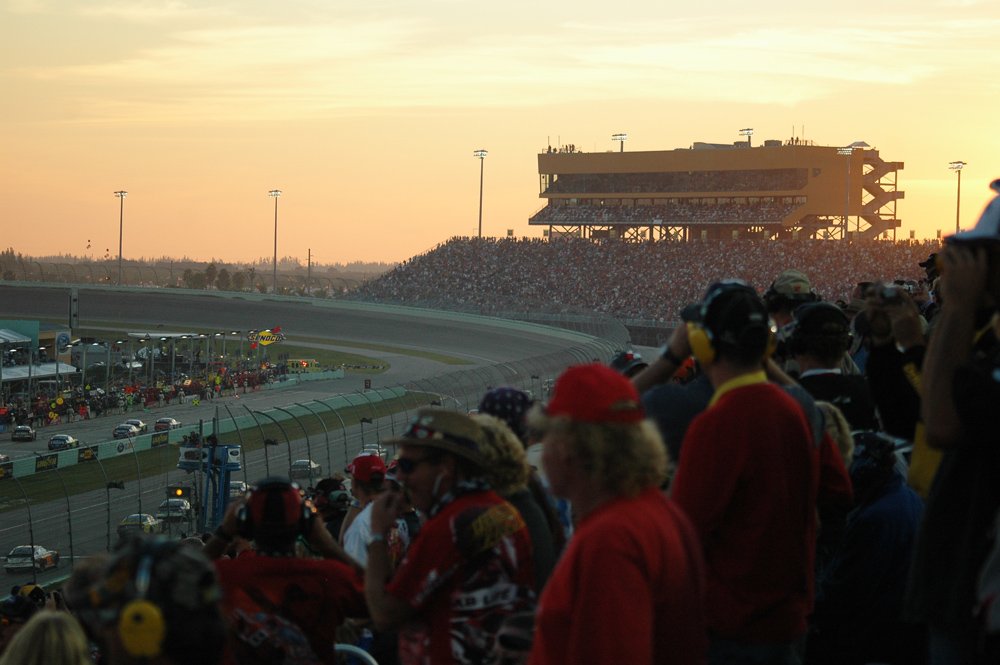
Homestead-Miami Speedway, where the race was held.

The Cafés do Brasil Indy 300 was confirmed as part of the Indy Racing League's (IRL) 2010 schedule for the IndyCar Series in July 2009. It was the tenth consecutive year the race was held in the series, and the 15th running of the Cafés do Brasil Indy 300, counting the period from 1996 to 2000 when it was a Championship Auto Racing Teams (CART) event. The Cafés do Brasil Indy 300 was the 17th (and final) race scheduled for 2010 by the IRL, and was held on October 2, 2010, in Homestead, Florida, at Homestead–Miami Speedway oval track over a distance of 300 mi (480 km) and 200 laps. It was the second round held in Florida, following the Honda Grand Prix of St. Petersburg in March. Tire supplier Firestone brought three types of tire to the race: two dry compounds (black-sidewall "Primary" and red-banded "Alternate") and grooved rain tires.

At this late stage of the season, Team Penske driver Will Power was the points leader with 587 points, with Dario Franchitti 12 points behind in second. Hélio Castroneves was third with 501 points; Scott Dixon was fourth, and Ryan Briscoe was fifth. A total of 53 points were available for the season's final round which meant Franchitti could win the championship for the third time. Franchitti would become champion if he qualified on the pole position, led the most laps and won the race and if Power finished in second. In the event the two drivers were tied on points, Power would be the champion having won five races to Franchitti's three. Franchitti needed to score 13 more points than Power to win the title. Franchitti was the race's defending champion after winning the 2009 edition.

Power and Franchitti had battled each other for the title all season. After finishing third at the previous round in Motegi, Japan, Power said he was confident he could approach the final race more aggressively and believed it was the first time in his career he had the necessary equipment to win races, and was in a position to do so on oval tracks. Power winning the championship would mean Team Penske would claim their first title since 2006. Franchitti, who was familiar with Homestead-Miami Speedway, revealed he would not alter his plan and went to the track to win the race; he acknowledged that eliminating the 12-point deficit would not be easy. He also noted the high number of entries for the race had the potential to affect the championship battle, "I think the other guys on the track, they've got their own reasons. They're trying to win the race the same as any other race. And as long as I think they race with the same respect that they have all season, then I think we'll be OK. There's a couple of cars that I think really ... certainly one that's difficult enough to run a consistent lane. So I don't think you can expect much more."

On September 8, IndyCar Chief Executive Officer Randy Bernard announced via e-mail that Homestead–Miami Speedway would not hold a race in 2011. While he praised the track, the objectives of the track's owners and the series were "not aligned", and the IRL elected to omit Homestead-Miami Speedway from its calendar. The Miami Herald reported the track appeared to suffer management-wise because it was owned and operated by International Speedway Corporation which had three other circuits expected for removal from the 2011 season. Homestead–Miami Speedway's president Matthew Becherer said that he wanted the IndyCar race to remain, but could not do so after the series raised the event's sanctioning fee by 30 percent. Bernard said while the series was receptive to returning to the track in the future, he blamed the organizers for failing to promote IndyCar.

There were two driver changes for the race. Dreyer & Reinbold Racing announced eight days beforehand that Ana Beatriz would fill in for regular driver Mike Conway in the team's No. 24 car. Conway had been able to return to full fitness following a major accident in the Indianapolis 500 in May but chose not to compete at Homestead–Miami Speedway because he wanted to regain his strength and focus on the 2011 season. It was Beatriz's fourth race of the season having previously taken part in the rounds at São Paulo, Indianapolis and Chicago. She was one of five women to compete in the event along with Danica Patrick, Sarah Fisher, Simona de Silvestro and Milka Duno. Conquest Racing employed Indy Lights driver and Formula BMW race winner Sebastián Saavedra to drive their No. 36 car, becoming the sixth person to race for the team in 2010.

== Practice and qualifying ==
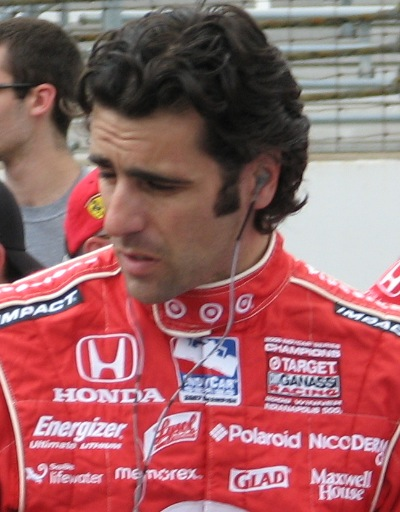
Dario Franchitti (pictured in 2009) took the thirteenth pole position of his career.

There were two practice sessions on the Saturday preceding the race; the first ran for 60 minutes and the second 30 minutes. Power was fastest in the first practice session with a lap of 25.0824 seconds; Dixon, Briscoe, Franchitti, Castroneves, Dan Wheldon, Marco Andretti, Alex Tagliani, Vítor Meira and Tony Kanaan made up positions two to ten. A caution flag was shown late in the session for a track inspection.

Two hours and 15 minutes after the first practice session ended, the 27 drivers determined the starting grid through qualifying. Each driver ran two laps, with both attempts added together to form a combined two-lap effort from each participant. The starting order was determined by the competitors' fastest lap times. The driver who won the pole position earned one point towards the drivers' standings. Franchitti clinched his second pole position of the season and the 13th of his career with a two-lap effort of 50.1532 seconds. He was joined on the grid's front row by Dixon. Power, who held the pole position for most of qualifying until Franchitti's lap, was third, his teammate Briscoe took fourth and Wheldon fifth. Justin Wilson, Ed Carpenter, Kanaan, Takuma Sato and Castroneves were in positions six to ten. Behind them, the rest of the grid lined up as: Patrick (the highest-placed female qualifier), E. J. Viso, Mario Moraes, Bertrand Baguette, Beatriz, Andretti, Fisher, Graham Rahal, Tagliani, Ryan Hunter-Reay, Vítor Meira, Alex Lloyd, Raphael Matos, Saavedra, de Silvestro, Hideki Mutoh, and Duno. There were no reports of incidents during qualifying. Franchitti, who reduced his championship disadvantage over Power to 11 points by taking the pole position, said after qualifying, "I don’t know what (crew chief) Chris Simmons did to the Target car between practice and now, but that thing was beautifully balanced. (After the first timed lap) it felt like a good lap, and I looked down and saw 213 and said: 'Oh, nice. Let’s see if we can not screw up the second lap.' I felt it; I was able to take the line I wanted. Now I can relax a little."

The second practice was held at night and Briscoe led with a lap of 25.3160 seconds. His Penske Racing teammate Castroneves was 0.0794 seconds slower in second place; Matos improved on his qualifying performance to finish third. Franchitti was fourth; Wheldon replicated his qualifying result in fifth position. The top ten was rounded out by Patrick, Power, Dixon, Tagliani, and Andretti.

=== Qualifying classification ===
Qualifying results
Pos	No.	Driver	Team	Lap 1	Lap 2	Total
1	10	Dario Franchitti (GBR)	Chip Ganassi Racing	25.0689	25.0843	50.1532
2	9	Scott Dixon (NZL)	Chip Ganassi Racing	25.0930	25.1258	50.2188
3	12	Will Power (AUS)	Team Penske	25.1577	25.1387	50.2964
4	6	Ryan Briscoe (AUS)	Team Penske	25.2009	25.1954	50.3963
5	4	Dan Wheldon (GBR)	Panther Racing	25.2505	25.1994	50.4499
6	22	Justin Wilson (GBR)	Dreyer & Reinbold Racing	25.2698	25.2523	50.5221
7	20	Ed Carpenter (USA)	Panther Racing	25.2629	25.3036	50.5665
8	11	Tony Kanaan (BRA)	Andretti Autosport	25.2815	25.2975	50.5790
9	5	Takuma Sato (JPN)	KV Racing Technology	25.3067	25.2812	50.5879
10	3	Hélio Castroneves (BRA)	Team Penske	25.2970	25.3185	50.6155
11	7	Danica Patrick (USA)	Andretti Autosport	25.3362	25.3337	50.6699
12	8	E. J. Viso (VEN)	KV Racing Technology	25.3496	25.3407	50.6903
13	32	Mario Moraes (BRA)	KV Racing Technology	25.3482	25.3870	50.7352
14	34	Bertrand Baguette (BEL)	Conquest Racing	25.3394	25.3966	50.7360
15	24	Ana Beatriz (BRA)	Dreyer & Reinbold Racing	25.3685	25.3731	50.7416
16	26	Marco Andretti (USA)	Andretti Autosport	25.3717	25.3739	50.7456
17	67	Sarah Fisher (USA)	Sarah Fisher Racing	25.3575	25.3946	50.7521
18	02	Graham Rahal (USA)	Newman/Haas Racing	25.3658	25.3965	50.7623
19	77	Alex Tagliani (CAN)	FAZZT Race Team	25.3851	25.4034	50.7885
20	37	Ryan Hunter-Reay (USA)	Andretti Autosport	25.4499	25.4572	50.9071
21	14	Vítor Meira (BRA)	A. J. Foyt Enterprises	25.4144	25.4957	50.9101
22	19	Alex Lloyd (GBR)	Dale Coyne Racing	25.5221	25.5275	51.0496
23	2	Raphael Matos (BRA)	de Ferran Dragon Racing	25.5388	25.5432	51.0820
24	36	Sebastián Saavedra (COL)	Conquest Racing	25.5367	25.5460	51.0827
25	78	Simona de Silvestro (SUI)	HVM Racing	25.5698	25.5915	51.1613
26	06	Hideki Mutoh (JPN)	Newman/Haas Racing	25.5570	25.7041	51.2611
27	18	Milka Duno (VEN)	Dale Coyne Racing	25.7039	25.7096	51.4135

== Race ==
The race began at 19:00 PM Eastern Daylight Time (UTC+04:00), and was televised live on Versus. Approximately 14,000 spectators were in attendance. The weather at the start was clear and mild. The ambient temperature ranged from 80 to 87 °F (27 to 31 °C) and the track temperature was 85 to 89 °F (29 to 32 °C). The command to start engines was given by Castroneves and Kanaan in the pit lane. When the race commenced from its rolling start, Franchitti maintained his pole position advantage going into the first turn. His teammate Dixon tucked into his teammate's slipstream; the two could not break away from the rest of the field. Castroneves moved from tenth to fifth by the start of lap ten, while his fellow Brazilian Kanaan gained three positions to run in third as Power fell back. Franchitti encountered slower traffic as Kanaan overtook Dixon for second. The first caution was necessitated on the 36th lap; Moraes stopped with a mechanical fault in an unsafe section of the track in turn two. During the caution, several drivers, elected to make their first pit stops.

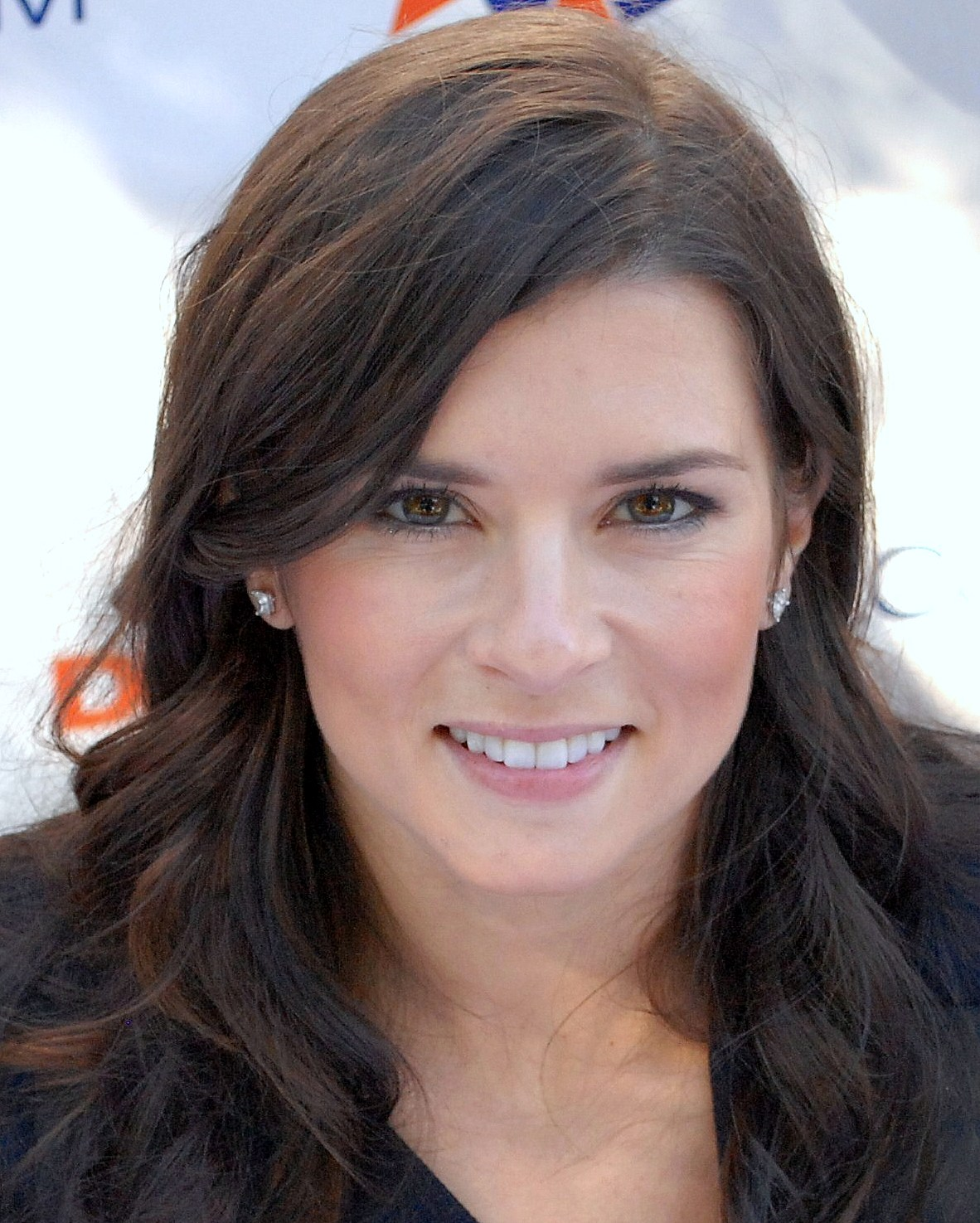
Danica Patrick equalled her best result of the season by taking second from teammate Tony Kanaan on the final lap.

Power reported steering problems, which were rectified in his pit box. Kanaan's vehicle appeared to stutter exiting his pit box; he avoided stalling as he swerved to avoid hitting a car that stopped ahead of him. The delay dropped him to fifth. Franchitti kept his lead at the restart on lap 42, followed by Briscoe in second place. On the following lap, Franchitti maintained his position on the left as Briscoe used his push-to-pass system to overtake him for the lead. Briscoe lost the position to Franchitti on lap 44; he kept it until Briscoe passed him again to reclaim first place. The event's second caution was waved on the 45th lap for an accident at turn four. Beatriz exited the pit lane late and slowed on the low part of the apron to allow the field through. Doing this prompted some drivers such as Patrick to scramble for space to avoid striking her car. As the field passed her, she accelerated up the bumpy asphalt surface, losing downforce and traction at the rear of her car. That caused Beatriz to collide with the outside wall at turn four. Her damaged car drifted down the track, and below the white line denoting the circuit's boundaries.

Most of the field, except for de Silvestro, Tagliani, Wilson, Mutoh, and Fisher, remained on the track during the caution. Franchitti again led at the restart on lap 52, with Briscoe in second. Briscoe and Franchitti clashed wheels in a battle for the lead that they exchanged all round the circuit. At this point, Kanaan was the fastest driver, overtaking Dixon and Castroneves to move to third position. He was soon in a three-way battle for first with Franchitti and Briscoe. Franchitti slowed slightly on lap 58 because his tires were possibly strained from maintaining a tight line on the right, allowing Briscoe into the lead. Two laps later, Kanaan and Dixon got ahead of Franchitti as he lost momentum and clear air from his earlier battle with Briscoe. Further down the order, Power overhauled Patrick in a battle for seventh position, and he later passed Wheldon to for sixth. Dixon passed Kanaan and Briscoe on the 62nd lap to take the lead. That same lap, Power avoided a collision with Patrick leaving turn four. Seven laps later, Kanaan passed Dixon for the lead. Franchitti returned to full speed, overtaking Briscoe and Dixon for second. He then passed Kanaan on the left to reclaim the lead on lap 73.

Franchitti increased his advantage to half a second as his car's handling seemed to come back in his favor. During this period, Power moved to fourth place. Wheldon and Briscoe made green flag pit stops for fuel and tires on lap 90. Franchitti, Kanaan and Power made their stops six laps later. In the meantime, the fuel hose on Viso's car was observed landing in the infield grass. No caution was needed since it was retrieved without trouble. After the pit stops, Franchitti returned to the lead, closely followed by Kanaan, Dixon, Power, Briscoe, and Castroneves. Franchitti held off Kanaan to earn two additional points for leading the most laps of any driver at the completion of lap 118, reducing his points deficit to nine. This meant Franchitti now had to win, and for Power to place fourth, to give him the Drivers' Championship. Lap 135 saw the third caution: Power slid into a right-hand side barrier leaving turn four after a failed attempt to lap Hunter-Reay's slower car on the outside. His rear-right suspension wishbone bent, and he spent a few laps driving slowly, before entering pit road; he had difficulty lining up correctly in his pit box.

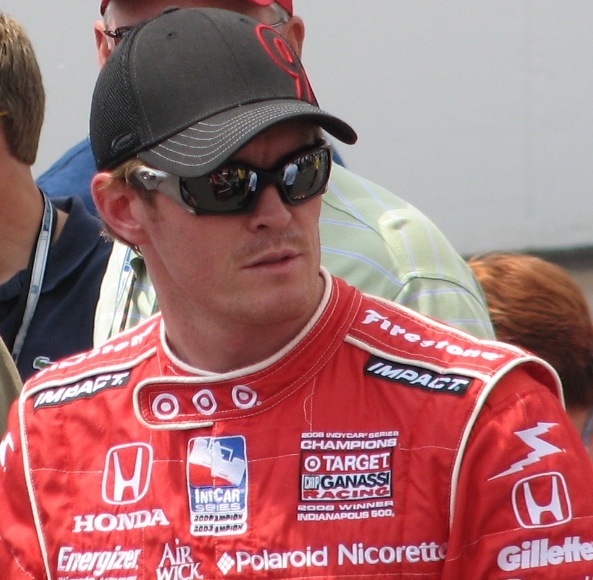
Scott Dixon (pictured in 2009) led a total of 47 laps to claim his third victory of the 2010 IndyCar Series and the 24th of his career.

Power's mechanics instructed him to switch off the engine, and he was taken behind the pit wall for his team to make repairs; they took five minutes and six seconds to complete, losing Power five laps to Franchitti. This now required Franchitti to finish at least tenth to win the Drivers' Championship as he elected to conserve fuel. Kanaan's fuel hose was still attached to his car when he left his pit stall, striking some members of his pit crew. He incurred a drive-through penalty that he took on lap 141; it dropped him to the back of the lead lap. One of the sidelights informing drivers when the pit lane was open required attention as Meira, Patrick and Kanaan made fuel stops to attempt to manage their usage over the last 50 laps. Power retired in the pit lane after completing 143 laps due to suspension damage. Racing resumed on lap 151 with Franchitti leading Dixon and Andretti. Dixon took the lead on lap 152 and was later challenged by Andretti to his right. When Andretti failed, he steered left, and passed Dixon for first on lap 158. Franchitti dropped to fourth when the fourth caution came out on lap 166 after an endplate from an unidentified car was located on the circuit. The caution provided some teams with an opportunity to make a final pit stop to allow their drivers to finish the race. On the next lap, Chip Ganassi Racing elected to alter their strategy. They asked Franchitti to enter the pit lane for fuel and tires for fuel mileage reasons, while Dixon stayed on the track.

Dixon, Castroneves, Kanaan, Patrick, Wheldon and Meira chose not to make another pit stop and Dixon led at the lap-172 restart. However, the restart was delayed twice to lap 174 because of consecutive false starts. Lap 176 saw the fifth (and final) caution: Duno spun up the track and into the concrete barrier between turns three and four. This caused Franchitti to slow to narrowly avoid ramming into her car; he fell to ninth. The green flag was waved on lap 183. Dixon pulled away, while Castroneves could not match the speed of the two Andretti Autosport cars of Kanaan and the aggressive Patrick, and fell to fourth. Dixon, unhindered, took his third victory of the season and the 24th of his career. Patrick was faster than her teammate Kanaan, and the two teammates battled for second for the remainder of the race once Kanaan realised he would not be able to catch Dixon. She used her push-to-pass system on the inside into turn one on lap 200, and despite minor contact with Kanaan, she took second by 0.0011 seconds. Briscoe, Castroneves, Meira and Andretti were fourth to seventh. Franchitti finished eighth to win his third Drivers' Championship and the fourth for Chip Ganassi Racing, becoming the first back-to-back champion since Sam Hornish Jr. in 2001 and 2002. Wheldon and Rahal rounded out the top ten. Hunter-Reay took 11th, and Lloyd won the Rookie of the Year award by finishing 12th. The final finishers were Carpenter, Tagliani, Baugette, Saavedra, Matos, Sato, Viso, Mutoh, Wilson, Fisher, and de Silvestro. There were four caution periods that slowed the race, and there was an event-record eighteen lead changes amongst seven drivers. Franchitti's 128 laps led was the most of any driver. His teammate Dixon led five times for a total of 47 laps.

=== Post-race ===
Dixon appeared in victory lane to celebrate his third win of the season in front of the crowd; the win earned him $272,500. He said of his victory, "This is exactly what we needed to end the season. We could see early on that Will [Power] was struggling and we set our strategy up after that. We were close on fuel until that last yellow, but we had the speed all night. It was a great race for the entire team, and I'm happy for Chip [Ganassi], Dario [Franchitti] and the entire organization." Patrick spoke of her feeling that finishing second was like a win to her, "This was a great way to end the season. We have had our high points and low points and the GoDaddy crew pulled it together for a strong end to the year. Hopefully we can continue to improve the car to be better for next year." Third-placed Kanaan said he did not observe Patrick in his rear-view mirrors. Nevertheless, he was happy with his performance notwithstanding a drive-through penalty. "Putting on a good show was the least we could do for the fans here tonight. I have to thank my crew. We had a moment there, but when we have a good car, it makes my life a whole lot easier. It was a good weekend as a team. I'm looking forward to next year."

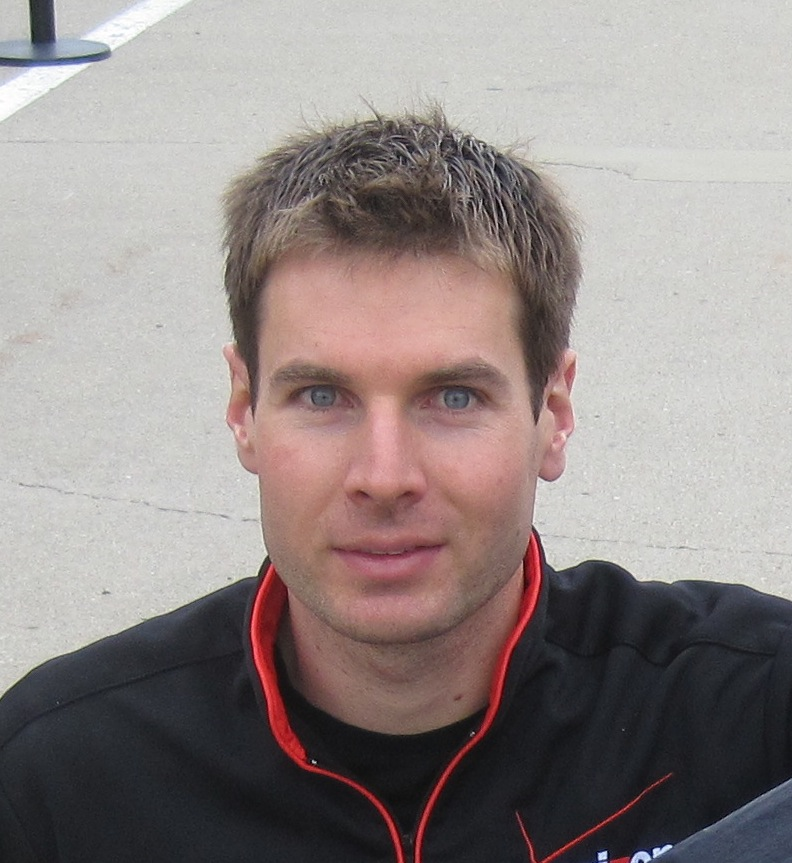
Will Power finished second to Franchitti in the points' standings.

Afterward, Franchitti began celebrating the third IndyCar Drivers' Championship of his career. During the celebrations, he said of his success: "Look back to the start of 2007, I hadn’t won a championship. Won a lot of races, not a championship or Indy 500. Now we find ourselves with two 500s and three championships. I’m just going to enjoy it. I think I’m just going to let it sink in, enjoy it. And if you ask me that question maybe starting next year I’ll give you a better answer. But I’m very proud of the achievement. And it’s an absolute honor to get to drive for the Target team. And the equipment they give me. And that feeling of success is great." Power said while he was disappointed not to win the championship, he wanted to come back stronger for the 2011 season after he had not won his first race on an oval track and lost a potential victory at Chicagoland due to a malfunctioning fuel hose. "Like I predicted at the beginning of the season, it was the guy and the team who made the least amount of mistakes that won the championship. But next year I'll come back really strong." Franchitti congratulated Power for the competition he provided and Patrick applauded the Australian.

Kanaan apologized to Patrick for the touching of wheels late in the race. Power told Patrick that Kanaan was not behaving as though he was her teammate. Patrick said she thought that team owner Michael Andretti was hoping the two drivers would not have an accident while Kanaan said it had been a close duel with Patrick. Team owner Chip Ganassi told reporters he did not consider issuing team orders on Dixon because of his awareness of the importance of claiming a championship. Meira was pleased to finish sixth: "it's good to finish the season on an up note. Now we have six months, six months of positive thinking. Hopefully that will carry over for next year." Lloyd was delighted to win the Rookie of the Year title: "There were some low points in the year, but it was a great season overall. We had to get everything to blend together, and I feel that we accomplished that." Because he finished eighth, Franchitti won the Drivers' Championship by five points over Power in second position. With 547 points, Dixon's victory secured him third while Castroneves' fifth-place result dropped him to fourth position with 531 points. Briscoe ended the year in fifth position with 482 points after finishing fourth in the event.

=== Race classification ===
Race results
Pos	No.	Driver	Team	Laps	Time/Retired	Points
1	9	Scott Dixon (NZL)	Chip Ganassi Racing	200	1:52:08.5580	50
2	7	Danica Patrick (USA)	Andretti Autosport	200	1:52:11.3167	40
3	11	Tony Kanaan (BRA)	Andretti Autosport	200	1:52:11.3278	35
4	6	Ryan Briscoe (AUS)	Team Penske	200	1:52:12.3407	32
5	3	Hélio Castroneves (BRA)	Team Penske	200	1:52:13.8904	30
6	14	Vítor Meira (BRA)	A. J. Foyt Enterprises	200	1:52:15.7706	28
7	26	Marco Andretti (USA)	Andretti Autosport	200	1:52:16.9217	26
8	10	Dario Franchitti (GBR)	Chip Ganassi Racing	200	1:52:19.6981	27
9	4	Dan Wheldon (GBR)	Panther Racing	200	1:52:30.8101	22
10	02	Graham Rahal (USA)	Newman/Haas Racing	199	+1 lap	20
11	37	Ryan Hunter-Reay (USA)	Andretti Autosport	199	+1 lap	19
12	19	Alex Lloyd (GBR)	Dale Coyne Racing	199	+1 lap	18
13	20	Ed Carpenter (USA)	Panther Racing	199	+1 lap	17
14	77	Alex Tagliani (CAN)	FAZZT Race Team	199	+1 lap	16
15	34	Bertrand Baguette (BEL)	Conquest Racing	199	+1 lap	15
16	36	Sebastián Saavedra (COL)	Conquest Racing	199	+1 lap	14
17	2	Raphael Matos (BRA)	de Ferran Dragon Racing	199	+1 lap	13
18	5	Takuma Sato (JPN)	KV Racing Technology	199	+1 lap	12
19	8	E. J. Viso (VEN)	KV Racing Technology	198	+2 laps	12
20	06	Hideki Mutoh (JPN)	Newman/Haas Racing	198	+2 laps	12
21	22	Justin Wilson (GBR)	Dreyer & Reinbold Racing	198	+2 laps	12
22	67	Sarah Fisher (USA)	Sarah Fisher Racing	197	+3 laps	12
23	78	Simona de Silvestro (SUI)	HVM Racing	197	+3 laps	12
24	18	Milka Duno (VEN)	Dale Coyne Racing	170	Contact	12
25	12	Will Power (AUS)	Team Penske	143	Contact	10
26	24	Ana Beatriz (BRA)	Dreyer & Reinbold Racing	42	Contact	10
27	32	Mario Moraes (BRA)	KV Racing Technology	25	Mechanical	10

== Standings after the race ==
Drivers' Championship standings
Pos	+/–	Driver	Points
1	1	Dario Franchitti (GBR)	602
2	1	Will Power (AUS)	597 (−5)
3	1	Scott Dixon (NZL)	547 (−55)
4	1	Hélio Castroneves (BRA)	531 (−71)
5		Ryan Briscoe (AUS)	482 (−120)
Sources:

- Note: Only the top five positions are included for the drivers' standings.

Previous race: 2010 Indy Japan 300	IndyCar Series; 2010 season	Next race: 2011 Honda Grand Prix of St. Petersburg
Previous race: 2009 Firestone Indy 300	2010 Cafés do Brasil Indy 300	Next race: N/A
