= Mario Moraes =

Brazilian racing driver

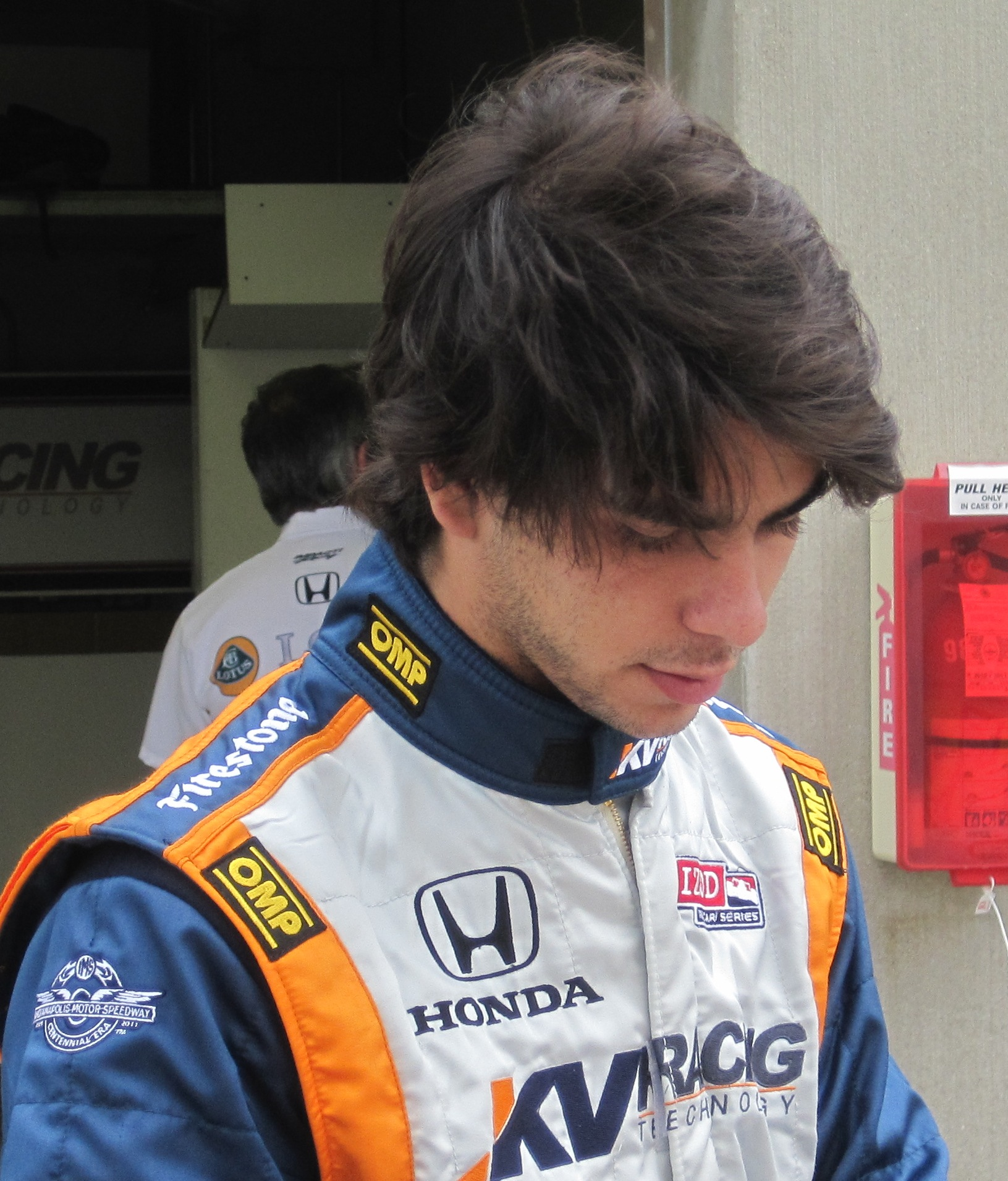
- Moraes at the Indianapolis Motor Speedway in May 2010.
- Nationality: (Brazil) Brazilian
- Born: December 20, 1988 (age 37) São Paulo, Brazil
- Relatives: Antônio Ermírio de Moraes (grandfather)

IRL IndyCar Series career
- Debut season: 2008
- Current team: inactive
- Former teams: KV Racing Technology (2009-2010); Dale Coyne Racing (2008)
- Starts: 43
- Wins: 0
- Poles: 0
- Best finish: 14th in 2009

Previous series
- 2006-2007 2005-2006 2004: British F3; F3 Sudamericana; FTR Pro Series FR1600

Mario Ermirio de Moraes Filho (born December 20, 1988) is a Brazilian professional race car driver. Moraes started his career in minor youth motorsports. In 2003, Moraes competed in American Formula Renault with World Speed Motorsports and won races against some competition such as Marco Andretti. In 2005, he drove for the Bassan Motorsport team in Formula Three Sudamericana and finished eighth.

In 2006, he finished second in F3 Sudamericana, then moved to the British Formula Three National Class driving for Carlin Motorsport and earned several good finishes while not competing for series points. He finished in fourteenth place in the 2007 British Formula Three championship's Championship Class, again competing for Carlin.

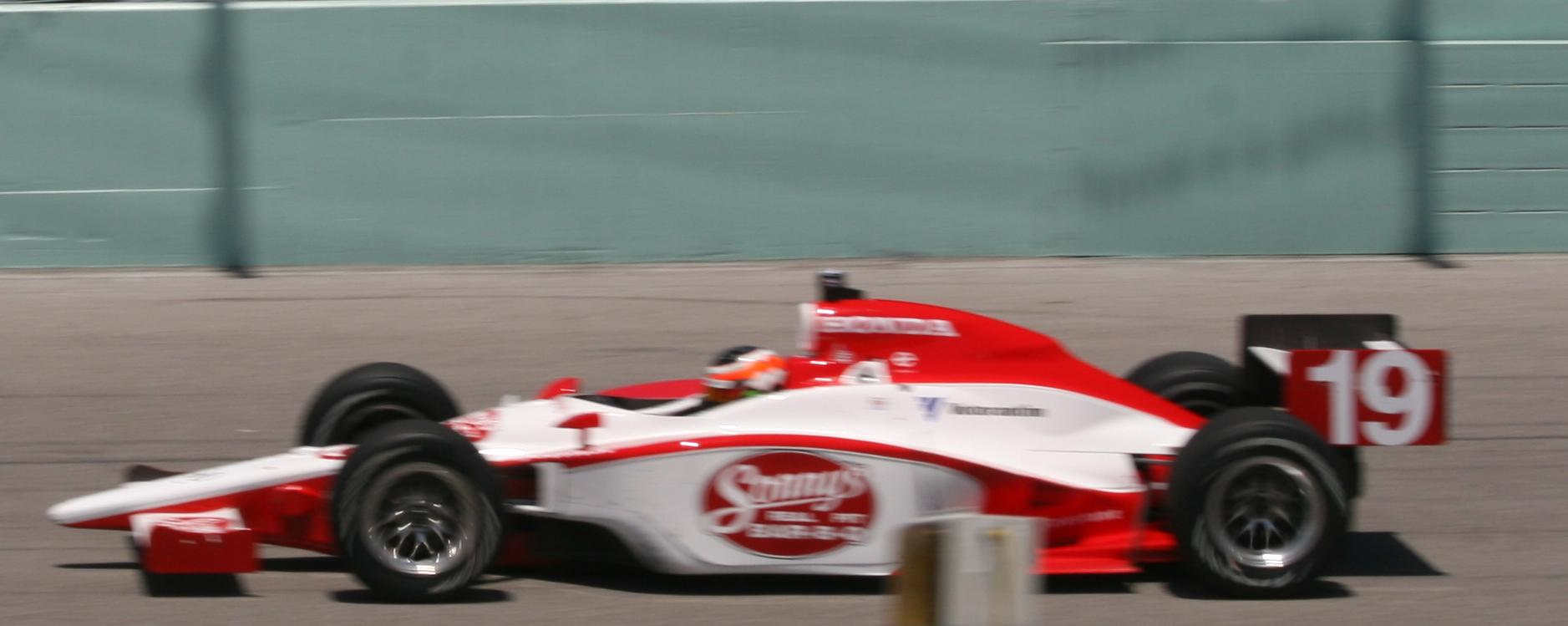
Moraes in 2008.

In 2008, Moraes drove in the IndyCar Series for Dale Coyne Racing. He finished 21st in points with a best finish of seventh at Watkins Glen International.

Moraes drove for KV Racing Technology in 2009, with a best finish as third at Chicagoland.

== Motorsports career results ==
=== American open–wheel results ===
(key) (Races in bold indicate pole position)

==== IndyCar ====
Year	Team	No.	Chassis	Engine	1	2	3	4	5	6	7	8	9	10	11	12	13	14	15	16	17	18	19	Rank	Points	Ref
2008	Dale Coyne Racing	19	Dallara IR-05	Honda HI7R V8	HMS; 16	STP; 16	MOT^{1} DNP		KAN; 17	INDY; 18	MIL; 23	TXS; 18	IOW; 19	RIR; 17	WGL; 7	NSH; 10	MDO; 24	EDM; 20	KTY; 17	SNM; 10	DET; 15	CHI; 21	SRF^{2} 24	21st	244	
2008	Dale Coyne Racing	19	Panoz DP01	Cosworth XFE V8t				LBH^{1} 20																21st	244	
2009	KV Racing Technology	5	Dallara IR-05	Honda HI7R V8	STP; 21	LBH; 19	KAN; 11	INDY; 33	MIL; 9	TXS; 10	IOW; 17	RIR; 16	WGL; 14	TOR; 11	EDM; 23	KTY; 18	MDO	SNM; 4	CHI; 3	MOT; 5	HMS; 7			14th	304	
2010	KV Racing Technology	32	Dallara IR-05	Honda HI7R V8	SAO; 24	STP; 21	ALA; 13	LBH; 6	KAN; 7	INDY; 31	TXS; 21	IOW; 25	WGL; 5	TOR; 14	EDM; 7	MDO; 12	SNM; 11	CHI; 17	KTY; 18	MOT; 24	HMS; 27			15th	287	

^{1} Run on same day.
^{2} Non-points race.

Years	Teams	Races	Poles	Wins	Podiums (non-win)	Top 10s (non-podium)	Indianapolis 500 wins	Championships
3	2	43	0	0	1	10	0	0

==== Indianapolis 500 results ====
Year	Chassis	Engine	Start	Finish	Team
2008	Dallara	Honda	28	18	Coyne
2009	Dallara	Honda	7	33	KV Racing
2010	Dallara	Honda	13	31	KV Racing
