= 2009 RoadRunner Turbo Indy 300 =

(United States) 2009 Kansas
Race details
- 3rd round of the 2009 IndyCar Series season
- Date: April 26, 2009
- Official name: RoadRunner Turbo Indy 300
- Location: Kansas Speedway
- Course: Permanent racing facility 1.520 mi / 2.446 km
- Distance: 200 laps 304.000 mi / 489.241 km
- Weather: 78 °F (26 °C), Overcast

Pole position
- Driver: (United States) Graham Rahal (N/H/L Racing)
- Time: 1:43.5819 (4 laps)

Fastest lap
- Driver: (Australia) Ryan Briscoe (Penske Racing)
- Time: 25.9367 (on lap 162 of 200)

Podium
- First: (New Zealand) Scott Dixon (Chip Ganassi Racing)
- Second: (Brazil) Hélio Castroneves (Penske Racing)
- Third: (Brazil) Tony Kanaan (Andretti Green Racing)

The 2009 RoadRunner Turbo Indy 300 was the third round of the 2009 IndyCar Series season, held on April 26, 2009 at the 1.520-mile (2.446 km) Kansas Speedway. The race was won by Scott Dixon, who led 134 of the 200 laps to move up into fourth place in the championship standings. Championship leader Dario Franchitti made contact with the wall, and was classified eighteenth, which dropped him to third overall. Tony Kanaan's third place was enough to give him the championship lead, by a point from Ryan Briscoe, who finished fourth.

== Race ==
| Pos | No. | Driver | Team | Laps | Time/Retired | Grid | Laps Led | Points |
|---|---|---|---|---|---|---|---|---|
| 1 | 9 | (New Zealand) Scott Dixon | Chip Ganassi Racing | 200 | 1:43:21.0035 | 4 | 134 | 52 |
| 2 | 3 | (Brazil) Hélio Castroneves | Penske Racing | 200 | + 0.7104 | 22 | 3 | 40 |
| 3 | 11 | (Brazil) Tony Kanaan | Andretti Green Racing | 200 | + 1.5022 | 8 | 0 | 35 |
| 4 | 6 | (Australia) Ryan Briscoe | Penske Racing | 200 | + 1.8872 | 7 | 53 | 32 |
| 5 | 7 | (United States) Danica Patrick | Andretti Green Racing | 200 | + 2.6502 | 3 | 0 | 30 |
| 6 | 26 | (United States) Marco Andretti | Andretti Green Racing | 200 | + 3.8013 | 5 | 0 | 28 |
| 7 | 02 | (United States) Graham Rahal | Newman/Haas/Lanigan Racing | 200 | + 7.8233 | 1 | 8 | 27 |
| 8 | 27 | (Japan) Hideki Mutoh | Andretti Green Racing | 200 | + 8.5430 | 13 | 0 | 24 |
| 9 | 20 | (United States) Ed Carpenter | Vision Racing | 200 | + 8.9871 | 10 | 0 | 22 |
| 10 | 4 | (United Kingdom) Dan Wheldon | Panther Racing | 200 | + 9.7681 | 9 | 0 | 20 |
| 11 | 5 | (Brazil) Mario Moraes | KV Racing Technology | 200 | + 20.9048 | 6 | 0 | 19 |
| 12 | 06 | (Netherlands) Robert Doornbos (R) | Newman/Haas/Lanigan Racing | 199 | + 1 Lap | 2 | 2 | 18 |
| 13 | 67 | (United States) Sarah Fisher | Sarah Fisher Racing | 199 | + 1 Lap | 11 | 0 | 17 |
| 14 | 18 | (United Kingdom) Justin Wilson | Dale Coyne Racing | 199 | + 1 Lap | 17 | 0 | 16 |
| 15 | 21 | (United States) Ryan Hunter-Reay | Vision Racing | 196 | + 4 Laps | 20 | 0 | 15 |
| 16 | 23 | (Venezuela) Milka Duno | Dreyer & Reinbold Racing | 195 | + 5 Laps | 12 | 0 | 14 |
| 17 | 98 | (United States) Stanton Barrett (R) | Team 3G | 181 | + 19 Laps | 19 | 0 | 13 |
| 18 | 10 | (United Kingdom) Dario Franchitti | Chip Ganassi Racing | 151 | Contact | 21 | 0 | 12 |
| 19 | 24 | (United Kingdom) Mike Conway (R) | Dreyer & Reinbold Racing | 109 | Mechanical | 16 | 0 | 12 |
| 20 | 2 | (Brazil) Raphael Matos (R) | Luczo Dragon Racing | 95 | Contact | 15 | 0 | 12 |
| 21 | 13 | (Venezuela) E. J. Viso | HVM Racing | 37 | Mechanical | 18 | 0 | 12 |
| 22 | 14 | (Brazil) Vítor Meira | A. J. Foyt Enterprises | 14 | Contact | 14 | 0 | 12 |

== Standings after the race ==
Drivers' Championship standings

| Pos | Driver | Points |
|---|---|---|
| 1 | (Brazil) Tony Kanaan | 100 |
| 2 | (Australia) Ryan Briscoe | 99 |
| 3 | (United Kingdom) Dario Franchitti | 96 |
| 4 | (New Zealand) Scott Dixon | 81 |
| 5 | (United States) Ryan Hunter-Reay | 74 |

- Note: Only the top five positions are included for the standings.

| Previous race: 2009 Toyota Grand Prix of Long Beach | IndyCar Series; 2009 season | Next race: 2009 Indianapolis 500 |
| Previous race: 2008 RoadRunner Turbo Indy 300 | 2009 RoadRunner Turbo Indy 300 | Next race: 2010 RoadRunner Turbo Indy 300 |
