= 2010 RoadRunner Turbo Indy 300 =

(United States) 2010 Kansas
Race details
- 5th round of the 2010 IndyCar Series season
- Date: May 1, 2010
- Official name: RoadRunner Turbo Indy 300
- Location: Kansas Speedway
- Course: Permanent racing facility 1.520 mi / 2.446 km
- Distance: 200 laps 304.000 mi / 489.241 km

Pole position
- Driver: (Australia) Ryan Briscoe (Team Penske)
- Time: 1:43.1747 (4 laps)

Fastest lap
- Driver: (Brazil) Tony Kanaan (Andretti Autosport)
- Time: 25.6653 (on lap 197 of 200)

Podium
- First: (New Zealand) Scott Dixon (Chip Ganassi Racing)
- Second: (United Kingdom) Dario Franchitti (Chip Ganassi Racing)
- Third: (Brazil) Tony Kanaan (Andretti Autosport)

The 2010 RoadRunner Turbo Indy 300 was the tenth running of the Kansas Indy 300 and the fifth round of the 2010 IndyCar Series season. It took place on Saturday, May 1, 2010. The race was contested over 200 laps at the 1.520-mile (2.446 km) Kansas Speedway in Kansas City, Kansas, and was telecast by ABC in the United States.

The race was won by Scott Dixon who led 167 laps on the way to his 22nd career victory. Dixon's teammate Dario Franchitti completed a Ganassi 1-2 finish, with Tony Kanaan third for Andretti Autosport.

== Classification ==
=== Qualifying ===
Pos	No.	Driver	Team	Lap 1	Lap 2	Lap 3	Lap 4	Total
1	6	(Australia) Ryan Briscoe	Team Penske	25.7715	25.8106	25.7942	25.7984	1:43.1747
2	9	(New Zealand) Scott Dixon	Chip Ganassi Racing	25.9199	25.9048	25.9004	25.8630	1:43.5881
3	10	(United Kingdom) Dario Franchitti	Chip Ganassi Racing	25.9199	25.9025	25.9070	25.8894	1:43.6188
4	06	(Japan) Hideki Mutoh	Newman/Haas Racing	25.9200	25.9084	25.9257	25.9615	1:43.7156
5	77	(Canada) Alex Tagliani	FAZZT Race Team	25.9566	25.9373	25.9527	25.9437	1:43.7903
6	14	(Brazil) Vítor Meira	A. J. Foyt Enterprises	25.9496	25.9723	25.9893	25.9834	1:43.8946
7	12	(Australia) Will Power	Team Penske	25.9457	25.9853	25.9931	25.9720	1:43.8961
8	3	(Brazil) Hélio Castroneves	Team Penske	25.9687	25.9900	26.0119	26.0267	1:43.9973
9	7	(United States) Danica Patrick	Andretti Autosport	26.0938	25.9862	25.9725	25.9638	1:44.0163
10	24	(United Kingdom) Mike Conway	Dreyer & Reinbold Racing	25.9880	26.0101	26.0193	26.0448	1:44.0622
11	5	(Japan) Takuma Sato (R)	KV Racing Technology	26.0151	26.0215	26.0079	26.0181	1:44.0626
12	32	(Brazil) Mario Moraes	KV Racing Technology	25.9846	26.0551	26.0515	26.0450	1:44.1362
13	2	(Brazil) Raphael Matos	Luczo Dragon Racing de Ferran Motorsports	26.0479	26.0788	26.0712	26.0743	1:44.2722
14	67	(United States) Sarah Fisher	Sarah Fisher Racing	26.0778	26.0867	26.0593	26.0704	1:44.2942
15	11	(Brazil) Tony Kanaan	Andretti Autosport	26.0721	26.0921	26.1016	26.0901	1:44.3559
16	8	(Venezuela) E. J. Viso	KV Racing Technology	26.0993	26.0891	26.0847	26.1045	1:44.3776
17	43	(United States) John Andretti	Andretti Autosport/Richard Petty Motorsports	26.0851	26.0988	26.0887	26.1132	1:44.3858
18	78	(Switzerland) Simona de Silvestro (R)	HVM Racing	26.1138	26.1191	26.1395	26.1565	1:44.5289
19	36	(Belgium) Bertrand Baguette (R)	Conquest Racing	26.1675	26.1493	26.1248	26.1138	1:44.5554
20	22	(United Kingdom) Justin Wilson	Dreyer & Reinbold Racing	26.1710	26.1641	26.1498	26.1581	1:44.6430
21	66	(United Kingdom) Jay Howard (R)	Sarah Fisher Racing	26.2002	26.2078	26.2158	26.2279	1:44.8517
22	37	(United States) Ryan Hunter-Reay	Andretti Autosport	26.2426	26.2583	26.2607	26.2231	1:44.9847
23	19	(United Kingdom) Alex Lloyd (R)	Dale Coyne Racing	26.2684	26.2689	26.2702	26.2589	1:45.0664
24	18	(Venezuela) Milka Duno	Dale Coyne Racing	26.2861	26.2991	26.3530	26.3867	1:45.3249
25^{1}	4	(United Kingdom) Dan Wheldon	Panther Racing	25.9105	25.9004	25.9068	25.8981	1:43.6158
26^{1}	26	(United States) Marco Andretti	Andretti Autosport	26.0124	26.0240	25.9961	25.9961	1:44.0286
27	34	(Brazil) Mario Romancini (R)	Conquest Racing					No Time
OFFICIAL QUALIFICATIONS REPORT

- 1. Both Dan Wheldon (Originally qualified 3rd) and Marco Andretti (11th) were sent to the rear of the field due to dropping below the white line on their qualifying runs. They were placed ahead of Mario Romancini who did not attempt a qualifying run.

=== Race ===
Pos	No.	Driver	Team	Laps	Time/Retired	Grid	Laps Led	Points
1	9	(New Zealand) Scott Dixon	Chip Ganassi Racing	200	1:50:43.1410	2	167	52
2	10	(United Kingdom) Dario Franchitti	Chip Ganassi Racing	200	+ 3.0528	3	2	40
3	11	(Brazil) Tony Kanaan	Andretti Autosport	200	+ 3.2210	15	0	35
4	3	(Brazil) Hélio Castroneves	Team Penske	200	+ 3.8300	8	0	32
5	37	(United States) Ryan Hunter-Reay	Andretti Autosport	200	+ 6.1133	22	0	30
6	6	(Australia) Ryan Briscoe	Team Penske	200	+ 6.7951	1	31	29
7	32	(Brazil) Mario Moraes	KV Racing Technology	199	+ 1 Lap	12	0	26
8	77	(Canada) Alex Tagliani	FAZZT Race Team	199	+ 1 Lap	5	0	24
9	43	(United States) John Andretti	Andretti Autosport/Richard Petty Motorsports	199	+ 1 Lap	17	0	22
10	14	(Brazil) Vítor Meira	A. J. Foyt Enterprises	199	+ 1 Lap	6	0	20
11	7	(United States) Danica Patrick	Andretti Autosport	198	+ 2 Laps	9	0	19
12	12	(Australia) Will Power	Team Penske	198	+ 2 Laps	7	0	18
13	26	(United States) Marco Andretti	Andretti Autosport	198	+ 2 Laps	26	0	17
14	24	(United Kingdom) Mike Conway	Dreyer & Reinbold Racing	198	+ 2 Laps	10	0	16
15	4	(United Kingdom) Dan Wheldon	Panther Racing	198	+ 2 Laps	25	0	15
16	2	(Brazil) Raphael Matos	Luczo Dragon Racing de Ferran Motorsports	198	+ 2 Laps	13	0	14
17	67	(United States) Sarah Fisher	Sarah Fisher Racing	198	+ 2 Laps	14	0	13
18	22	(United Kingdom) Justin Wilson	Dreyer & Reinbold Racing	197	+ 3 Laps	20	0	12
19	19	(United Kingdom) Alex Lloyd (R)	Dale Coyne Racing	197	+ 3 Laps	23	0	12
20	36	(Belgium) Bertrand Baguette (R)	Conquest Racing	197	+ 3 Laps	19	0	12
21	78	(Switzerland) Simona de Silvestro (R)	HVM Racing	197	+ 3 Laps	18	0	12
22	34	(Brazil) Mario Romancini (R)	Conquest Racing	187	+ 4 Laps	27	0	12
23	06	(Japan) Hideki Mutoh	Newman/Haas Racing	186	Contact	4	0	12
24	5	(Japan) Takuma Sato (R)	KV Racing Technology	186	Contact	11	0	12
25	66	(United Kingdom) Jay Howard (R)	Sarah Fisher Racing	172	Contact	21	0	10
26	18	(Venezuela) Milka Duno	Dale Coyne Racing	84	Mechanical	24	0	10
27	8	(Venezuela) E. J. Viso	KV Racing Technology	71	Contact	16	0	10
OFFICIAL RACE REPORT

== Championship standings after the race ==
Drivers' Championship standings

Pos	Driver	Points
1	(Australia) Will Power	190
2	(New Zealand) Scott Dixon	164
3	(Brazil) Hélio Castroneves	162
4	(United States) Ryan Hunter-Reay	159
5	(United Kingdom) Dario Franchitti	152

- Note: Only the top five positions are included.

Previous race: 2010 Toyota Grand Prix of Long Beach	IZOD IndyCar Series; 2010 season	Next race: 2010 Indianapolis 500
Previous race: 2009 RoadRunner Turbo Indy 300	2010 RoadRunner Turbo Indy 300	Next race: N/A
