= 2010 Toyota Grand Prix of Long Beach =

(United States) 2010 Long Beach
Race details
- 4th round of the 2010 IndyCar Series season
- Date: April 18, 2010
- Official name: Toyota Grand Prix of Long Beach
- Location: Streets of Long Beach
- Course: Temporary street circuit 1.968 mi / 3.167 km
- Distance: 85 laps 167.280 mi / 269.211 km

Pole position
- Driver: (Australia) Will Power (Team Penske)
- Time: 1:09.3185

Fastest lap
- Driver: (United States) Ryan Hunter-Reay (Andretti Autosport)
- Time: 1:10.5537 (on lap 82 of 85)

Podium
- First: (United States) Ryan Hunter-Reay (Andretti Autosport)
- Second: (United Kingdom) Justin Wilson (Dreyer & Reinbold Racing)
- Third: (Australia) Will Power (Team Penske)

Chronology
Previous	Next
2009	2011

The 2010 Toyota Grand Prix of Long Beach was the fourth round of the 2010 IndyCar Series season, and took place on April 18, 2010. The race was contested over 85 laps of the 1.968-mile (3.167 km) street course in Long Beach, California, and was telecast by Versus in the United States. The race also marked the 25th consecutive year of Toyota's sponsorship of the Grand Prix of Long Beach, one of the longest-running active sponsorships of a motor race in North America.

== Report ==
=== Race ===
The 27th edition of the Grand Prix of Long Beach got underway at 1:15 p.m. PDT. Points leader Will Power, starting on the pole for the third consecutive race led into the first turn. Justin Wilson attempted to go down the inside of Ryan Hunter-Reay, the man who started alongside Power on the front row, but he eventually settled into third spot. Tony Kanaan moved into fourth having got around both Hélio Castroneves and Ryan Briscoe at the start. The rest of the field got by the first turn without incident, usually uncommon in Long Beach. In the early laps of the race, Hunter-Reay stayed within a second of race leader Power, and Wilson kept a watching brief on the lead duo around 2 seconds behind Hunter-Reay. Fourth placed Kanaan was unable to keep up with the lead trio, but was able to keep Castroneves at arm's length.

This status quo was maintained till lap 17 when, coming off turn 11, race leader Power hit the pit lane speed limiter button by mistake. Both Hunter-Reay and Wilson took advantage of the error to go past, and Power got demoted to third by the time he had corrected it. On the next lap, Ryan Briscoe, who had spent most of the first stint holding off Scott Dixon, got around teammate Castroneves at turn 9 and left the latter to hold off the New Zealander.

The first round of pitstops took place between lap 25 and lap 30 and Hunter-Reay comfortably kept the lead ahead of Wilson and Power. Kanaan, in fourth, was now 15 seconds behind the leader, and fifth-placed Briscoe once again found himself harassed by Scott Dixon after the latter swapped places with Castroneves during the pit stops. Race leader Hunter-Reay began to catch lapped traffic at around the half-way mark, but maintained a lead of around 2–3 seconds over Wilson who in turn had Power 4–5 seconds behind him, the gaps fluctuating due to the traffic.

On lap 53, just a few corners after Hunter-Reay had got around Alex Lloyd to put him a lap down, Wilson also tried to get by him. However, he wasn't close enough and there was contact between the two, which left Wilson with a damaged front wing. He came in immediately and changed the entire nose assembly on his car, and filled his car up with fuel. However, the stop took 21 seconds and that meant that Power was able to make his second fuel stop and come out ahead of Wilson. Ryan Briscoe had a slow stop and dropped down to eighth behind Dixon, Castroneves and Mario Moraes.

The caution came out on lap 59 when Mario Romancini and Graham Rahal, both already a lap behind the leader, came together at turn 1 and ended up in the tyre barriers. This bunched the field up but importantly, Hunter-Reay had the two lapped cars of Raphael Matos and Takuma Sato between himself and second-placed Power. Thus, on the restart, Hunter-Reay had a clear run and pulled away from the field. Power struggled to get around Sato and Wilson took advantage of the situation to dive up the inside at turn 1 and take second. After his earlier incident with Lloyd, he was more cautious in dealing with the lapped cars, and by the time he had got around Matos, Hunter-Reay was over 5 seconds up the road.

Hunter-Reay managed the gap comfortably for the rest of the race and took his second career Indy Racing League win by 5.6 seconds from Wilson. Power had to make do with third ahead of Dixon and Kanaan. The top 10 was completed by Mario Moraes, Castroneves, Briscoe, Dan Wheldon and Mike Conway. Hunter-Reay's win moved him to third spot in the points standings, just 1 behind second-placed Castroneves. Points leader Power extended his lead to 42 points. Wilson moved to fourth in the points table, 4 points behind Hunter-Reay, while defending series champion Dario Franchitti dropped to sixth after his 12th-place finish.

== Classification ==
=== Qualifying ===
- All cars were split into two groups of twelve, with the fastest six from each group going through to the "top 12" session. In this session, the fastest six cars progressed to the "Firestone Fast Six". The fastest driver in the final session claimed pole, with the rest of the cars lining up in session order, regardless of qualifying times (fast six from 1–6, top 12 from 7–12 and round 1 from 13–25, with group 1 drivers occupying the odd–numbered grid positions, and group 2 drivers occupying the even–numbered grid positions).

Pos	No.	Driver	Team	Group 1	Group 2	Top 12	Fast 6
1	12	(Australia) Will Power	Team Penske		1:09.9270	1:09.5469	1:09.3185
2	37	(United States) Ryan Hunter-Reay	Andretti Autosport		1:09.9322	1:09.5815	1:09.7506
3	22	(United Kingdom) Justin Wilson	Dreyer & Reinbold Racing		1:09.9772	1:09.7909	1:09.7939
4	3	(Brazil) Hélio Castroneves	Team Penske		1:10.0055	1:09.7446	1:09.8470
5	6	(Australia) Ryan Briscoe	Team Penske	1:10.2439		1:09.8363	1:10.0255
6	11	(Brazil) Tony Kanaan	Andretti Autosport	1:10.1856		1:09.7656	1:10.1618
7	77	(Canada) Alex Tagliani	FAZZT Race Team	1:10.2228		1:09.8730	
8	9	(New Zealand) Scott Dixon	Chip Ganassi Racing	1:10.1233		1:09.9688	
9	26	(United States) Marco Andretti	Andretti Autosport	1:10.3594		1:10.1760	
10	4	(United Kingdom) Dan Wheldon	Panther Racing		1:10.1676	1:10.2574	
11	06	(Japan) Hideki Mutoh	Newman/Haas/Lanigan Racing		1:10.0433	1:10.2730	
12	10	(United Kingdom) Dario Franchitti	Chip Ganassi Racing	1:10.1816		1:10.3358	
13	78	(Switzerland) Simona de Silvestro (R)	HVM Racing	1:10.3722			
14	14	(Brazil) Vítor Meira	A. J. Foyt Enterprises		1:10.4259		
15	32	(Brazil) Mario Moraes	KV Racing Technology	1:10.5093			
16	24	(United Kingdom) Mike Conway	Dreyer & Reinbold Racing		1:10.4586		
17	8	(Venezuela) E. J. Viso	KV Racing Technology	1:10.5991			
18	2	(Brazil) Raphael Matos	Luczo Dragon Racing de Ferran Motorsports		1:10.5068		
19	5	(Japan) Takuma Sato (R)	KV Racing Technology	1:10.7000			
20	7	(United States) Danica Patrick	Andretti Autosport		1:10.5503		
21	19	(United Kingdom) Alex Lloyd (R)	Dale Coyne Racing	1:10.8003			
22	67	(United States) Graham Rahal	Sarah Fisher Racing		1:10.7722		
23	34	(Brazil) Mario Romancini (R)	Conquest Racing	1:10.9914			
24	36	(Belgium) Bertrand Baguette (R)	Conquest Racing	1:11.4345			
25	18	(Venezuela) Milka Duno	Dale Coyne Racing		No time		

=== Race ===
Pos	No.	Driver	Team	Laps	Time/Retired	Grid	Laps Led	Points
1	37	(United States) Ryan Hunter-Reay	Andretti Autosport	85	1:47:12.5404	2	64	52
2	22	(United Kingdom) Justin Wilson	Dreyer & Reinbold Racing	85	+ 5.6031	3	0	40
3	12	(Australia) Will Power	Team Penske	85	+ 8.5864	1	19	36
4	9	(New Zealand) Scott Dixon	Chip Ganassi Racing	85	+ 10.6287	8	2	32
5	11	(Brazil) Tony Kanaan	Andretti Autosport	85	+ 11.7732	6	0	30
6	32	(Brazil) Mario Moraes	KV Racing Technology	85	+ 16.5171	15	0	28
7	3	(Brazil) Hélio Castroneves	Team Penske	85	+ 16.8928	4	0	26
8	6	(Australia) Ryan Briscoe	Team Penske	85	+ 18.2214	5	0	24
9	4	(United Kingdom) Dan Wheldon	Panther Racing	85	+ 19.4575	10	0	22
10	24	(United Kingdom) Mike Conway	Dreyer & Reinbold Racing	85	+ 19.9307	16	0	20
11	14	(Brazil) Vítor Meira	A. J. Foyt Enterprises	85	+ 27.4005	14	0	19
12	10	(United Kingdom) Dario Franchitti	Chip Ganassi Racing	85	+ 28.1352	12	0	18
13	06	(Japan) Hideki Mutoh	Newman/Haas/Lanigan Racing	85	+ 28.6037	11	0	17
14	26	(United States) Marco Andretti	Andretti Autosport	85	+ 30.0120	9	0	16
15	8	(Venezuela) E. J. Viso	KV Racing Technology	85	+ 31.6182	17	0	15
16	7	(United States) Danica Patrick	Andretti Autosport	85	+ 32.1804	20	0	14
17	78	(Switzerland) Simona de Silvestro (R)	HVM Racing	85	+ 33.1652	13	0	13
18	5	(Japan) Takuma Sato (R)	KV Racing Technology	84	+ 1 Lap	19	0	12
19	19	(United Kingdom) Alex Lloyd (R)	Dale Coyne Racing	84	+ 1 Lap	21	0	12
20	2	(Brazil) Raphael Matos	Luczo Dragon Racing de Ferran Motorsports	84	+ 1 Lap	18	0	12
21	77	(Canada) Alex Tagliani	FAZZT Race Team	65	Mechanical	7	0	12
22	67	(United States) Graham Rahal	Sarah Fisher Racing	58	Contact	22	0	12
23	34	(Brazil) Mario Romancini (R)	Conquest Racing	58	Contact	23	0	12
24	36	(Belgium) Bertrand Baguette (R)	Conquest Racing	45	Mechanical	24	0	12
25	18	(Venezuela) Milka Duno	Dale Coyne Racing	10	Handling	25	0	10
OFFICIAL RACE REPORT

== Championship standings after the race ==
Drivers' Championship standings

Pos	Driver	Points
1	(Australia) Will Power	172
2	(Brazil) Hélio Castroneves	130
3	(United States) Ryan Hunter-Reay	129
4	(United Kingdom) Justin Wilson	125
5	(New Zealand) Scott Dixon	112

- Note: Only the top five positions are included.

Previous race: 2010 Indy Grand Prix of Alabama	IndyCar Series; 2010 season	Next race: 2010 RoadRunner Turbo Indy 300
Previous race: 2009 Toyota Grand Prix of Long Beach	2010 Toyota Grand Prix of Long Beach	Next race: 2011 Toyota Grand Prix of Long Beach
