= 2009 Toyota Grand Prix of Long Beach =

Second round of the 2009 IndyCar Series season

(United States) 2009 Long Beach
Race details
- 2nd round of the 2009 IndyCar Series season
- Date: April 19, 2009
- Official name: Toyota Grand Prix of Long Beach
- Location: Streets of Long Beach
- Course: Temporary Street Circuit; 1.968 mi / 3.167 km
- Distance: 85 laps 167.280 mi / 269.211 km
- Weather: 96 °F (36 °C), Sunny

Pole position
- Driver: (Australia) Will Power (Penske Racing)
- Time: 1:09.7107

Fastest lap
- Driver: (Australia) Ryan Briscoe (Penske Racing)
- Time: 1:11.2582 (on lap 82 of 85)

Podium
- First: (United Kingdom) Dario Franchitti (Chip Ganassi Racing)
- Second: (Australia) Will Power (Penske Racing)
- Third: (Brazil) Tony Kanaan (Andretti Green Racing)

Chronology
Previous	Next
2008	2010

The 2009 Toyota Grand Prix of Long Beach was the second round of the 2009 IndyCar Series season, held on April 19, 2009. The race was contested over 85 laps of the 1.968-mile (3.167 km) street course in Long Beach, California. Dario Franchitti recorded his first win since his 2007 championship win, after benefitting from an early full-course caution, having made a pitstop the lap before.

As a result of the Champ Car World Series merging with the IndyCar Series, the Toyota Grand Prix of Long Beach became an IndyCar event for the first time.

== Race ==
Pos	No.	Driver	Team	Laps	Time/Retired	Grid	Laps Led	Points
1	10	(United Kingdom) Dario Franchitti	Chip Ganassi Racing	85	1:58:47.4658	2	51	52
2	12	(Australia) Will Power	Team Penske	85	+3.3182	1	16	41
3	11	(Brazil) Tony Kanaan	Andretti Green Racing	85	+4.0537	11	7	35
4	7	(United States) Danica Patrick	Andretti Green Racing	85	+5.0742	22	0	32
5	4	(United Kingdom) Dan Wheldon	Panther Racing	85	+6.5655	14	0	30
6	26	(United States) Marco Andretti	Andretti Green Racing	85	+7.5900	19	6	28
7	3	(Brazil) Hélio Castroneves	Team Penske	85	+8.633	8	3	26
8	2	(Brazil) Raphael Matos (R)	Luczo Dragon Racing	85	+9.483	3	2	24
9	06	(Netherlands) Robert Doornbos (R)	Newman/Haas/Lanigan Racing	85	+9.958	15	0	22
10	34	(Canada) Alex Tagliani	Conquest Racing	85	+13.618	9	0	20
11	21	(United States) Ryan Hunter-Reay	Vision Racing	85	+15.209	12	0	19
12	02	(United States) Graham Rahal	Newman/Haas/Lanigan Racing	85	+15.850	7	0	18
13	6	(Australia) Ryan Briscoe	Team Penske	85	+65.101	10	0	17
14	14	(Brazil) Vítor Meira	A. J. Foyt Enterprises	84	+ 1 lap	20	0	16
15	9	(New Zealand) Scott Dixon	Chip Ganassi Racing	84	+ 1 lap	6	0	15
16	23	(United Kingdom) Darren Manning	Dreyer & Reinbold Racing	84	+ 1 lap	18	0	14
17	98	(United States) Stanton Barrett (R)	Team 3G	84	+ 1 lap	21	0	13
18	20	(United States) Ed Carpenter	Vision Racing	82	+ 3 laps	23	0	12
19	5	(Brazil) Mario Moraes	KV Racing Technology	71	Accident	13	0	12
20	27	(Japan) Hideki Mutoh	Andretti Green Racing	60	+ 25 laps (Running)	17	0	12
21	24	(United Kingdom) Mike Conway (R)	Dreyer & Reinbold Racing	51	Accident	16	0	12
22	18	(United Kingdom) Justin Wilson	Dale Coyne Racing	24	Collision	5	0	12
23	13	(Venezuela) E. J. Viso	HVM Racing	16	Collision	4	0	12

== Standings after the race ==
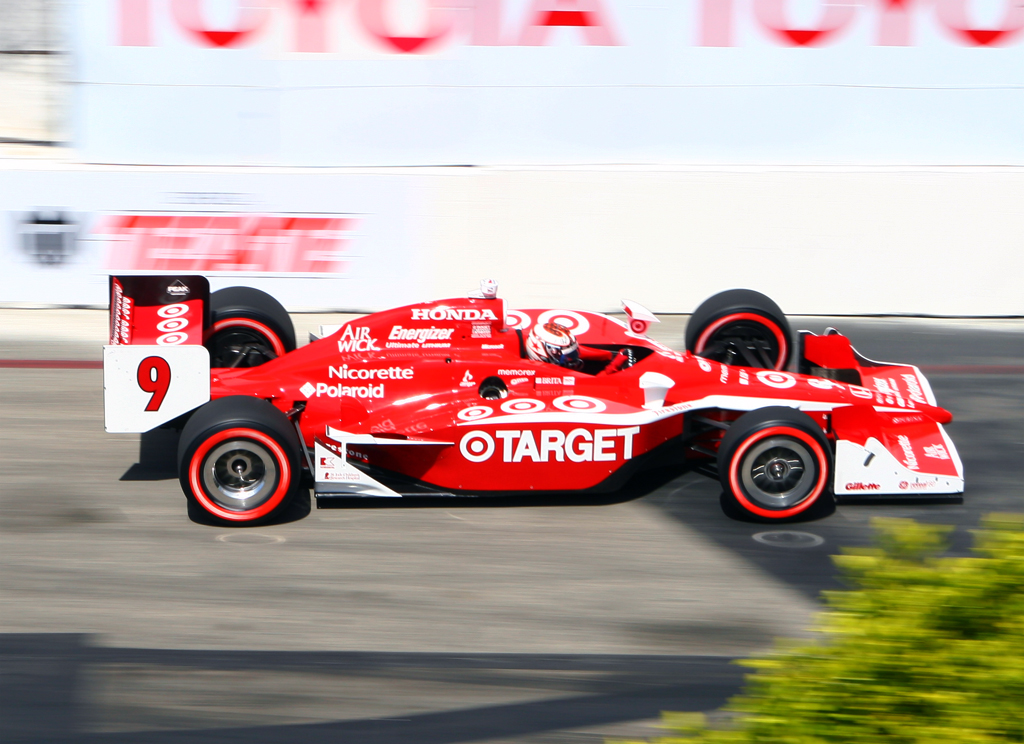
Scott Dixon

Drivers' Championship standings

Pos	Driver	Points
1	(United Kingdom) Dario Franchitti	84
2	(Australia) Will Power	69
3	(Australia) Ryan Briscoe	67
4	(Brazil) Tony Kanaan	65
5	(United States) Ryan Hunter-Reay	59

- Note: Only the top five positions are included for the standings.

Previous race: 2009 Honda Grand Prix of St. Petersburg	IndyCar Series; 2009 season	Next race: 2009 RoadRunner Turbo Indy 300
Previous race: 2008 Toyota Grand Prix of Long Beach	2009 Toyota Grand Prix of Long Beach	Next race: 2010 Toyota Grand Prix of Long Beach
