= 2008 Toyota Grand Prix of Long Beach =

(United States) 2008 Grand Prix of Long Beach
Race details
- 3rd (B) round of the 2008 IndyCar Series season
- Date: April 20, 2008
- Official name: Toyota Grand Prix of Long Beach
- Location: Streets of Long Beach
- Course: Temporary street circuit 1.968 mi / 3.167 km
- Distance: 83 laps 163.344 mi / 262.877 km
- Weather: 65 °F (18 °C), Sunny

Pole position
- Driver: (United Kingdom) Justin Wilson ( (United States) Newman/Haas/Lanigan Racing)
- Time: 1:06.902

Fastest lap
- Driver: (Brazil) Antônio Pizzonia ( (United States) Rocketsports)
- Time: 1:08.252 (on lap 68 of 83)

Podium
- First: (Australia) Will Power ( (United States) KV Racing Technology)
- Second: (France) Franck Montagny ( (United States) Forsythe/Pettit Racing)
- Third: (Mexico) Mario Domínguez ( (United States) Pacific Coast Motorsports)

Chronology
| Previous | Next |
|---|---|
| 2007 | 2009 |

The 2008 Toyota Grand Prix of Long Beach was an IndyCar Series motor race held at the streets of Long Beach in Long Beach, California, on April 20, 2008. It was the third round of the 2008 IndyCar Series for teams who competed in the Champ Car World Series in 2007. This was because the 2008 Indy Japan 300 occurred on the same weekend and there was no way of changing dates to avoid the clash. KV Racing Technology driver Will Power led all but two laps and won the race. Franck Montagny, driving for Forsythe/Pettit Racing, finished second, and Mario Domínguez finished third for Pacific Coast Motorsports.

Due to the reunification of IndyCar and Champ Car, this was the final race held under Champ Car sanctioning. The race was run under 2007 Champ Car rules, which included the standing start, option tires, two-day qualifying format, and was run based on time (1 hour, 45 minutes) rather than a set number of laps. The contingent of former Champ Car teams produced a 20-car field, all utilizing the turbocharged Panoz DP01-Cosworth for the final time. Every participant who elected to run other races in the IndyCar season was awarded championship points towards IndyCar. The option tire rule was adopted by the IRL for 2009, as well as standing starts for selected road and street course races in 2013 and 2014 only to be abandoned in 2015 due to safety concerns.

As the sole Champ Car event in 2008, the winner of this race would be the de facto champion of the 2008 Champ Car World Series season, similar to the USAC Gold Crown Series from 1984 to 1995. With Will Power winning the race, he is the last Champ Car champion. This fact is often unacknowledged.

Several IRL staff and team personnel had flown back from Japan Sunday afternoon (local time) and saw at least part of the race, including Motegi winner Danica Patrick, who had scored her historic win the previous evening.

== Results ==
| Finish | Car No. | Driver | Team | Laps | Time/Retired | Grid | Laps Led | Points |
|---|---|---|---|---|---|---|---|---|
| 1 | 8 | (Australia) Will Power | KV Racing Technology | 83 | 1:45:25.415 | 4 | 81 | 53 |
| 2 | 7 | (France) Franck Montagny (R) | Forsythe/Pettit Racing | 83 | +5.094 | 6 | 0 | 0 |
| 3 | 96 | (Mexico) Mario Domínguez | Pacific Coast Motorsports | 83 | +15.516 | 10 | 0 | 35 |
| 4 | 36 | (Brazil) Enrique Bernoldi (R) | Conquest Racing | 83 | +25.677 | 8 | 0 | 32 |
| 5 | 5 | (Spain) Oriol Servià | KV Racing Technology | 83 | +26.276 | 12 | 0 | 30 |
| 6 | 34 | (France) Franck Perera (R) | Conquest Racing | 83 | +28.067 | 3 | 0 | 28 |
| 7 | 15 | (Canada) Alex Tagliani | Walker Racing | 83 | +36.518 | 2 | 0 | 26 |
| 8 | 37 | (Mexico) David Martínez (R) | Forsythe/Pettit Racing | 83 | +37.127 | 18 | 0 | 0 |
| 9 | 33 | (Venezuela) E. J. Viso (R) | HVM Racing | 83 | +44.944 | 14 | 1 | 22 |
| 10 | 12 | (United States) Jimmy Vasser | KV Racing Technology | 83 | +48.635 | 13 | 0 | 0 |
| 11 | 3 | (Canada) Paul Tracy | Forsythe/Pettit Racing | 83 | +55.956 | 5 | 0 | 19 |
| 12 | 18 | (Brazil) Bruno Junqueira | Dale Coyne Racing | 83 | +1:07.553 | 11 | 0 | 18 |
| 13 | 06 | (United States) Graham Rahal | Newman/Haas/Lanigan Racing | 82 | Crash | 9 | 0 | 17 |
| 14 | 29 | (United States) Alex Figge | Pacific Coast Motorsports | 82 | +1 Lap | 16 | 0 | 0 |
| 15 | 4 | (France) Nelson Philippe | HVM Racing | 80 | +3 Laps | 7 | 0 | 0 |
| 16 | 9 | (Brazil) Antônio Pizzonia (R) | Rocketsports | 80 | +3 Laps | 15 | 0 | 0 |
| 17 | 14 | (Brazil) Roberto Moreno | HVM Racing | 63 | Drive train | 17 | 1 | 0 |
| 18 | 10 | (Finland) Juho Annala (R) | Rocketsports | 42 | Brakes | 20 | 0 | 0 |
| 19 | 02 | (United Kingdom) Justin Wilson | Newman/Haas/Lanigan Racing | 12 | Engine | 1 | 0 | 12 |
| 20 | 19 | (Brazil) Mario Moraes (R) | Dale Coyne Racing | 5 | Crash | 19 | 0 | 12 |
Race average speed: 92.964 mph (149.611 km/h)
Lead changes: 3 between 3 drivers
Cautions: 3 for 9 laps

== Points standings ==
=== IndyCar Series points standings (Top 10) ===
IRL Standings after Long Beach
| Pos. | Driver | Pts. | Pos. Change |
|---|---|---|---|
| 1 | (Brazil) Helio Castroneves | 112 | 0 |
| 2 | (United States) Scott Dixon | -12 | 0 |
| 3 | (United States) Danica Patrick | -14 | 0 |
| 4 | (Brazil) Tony Kanaan | -23 | 0 |
| 5 | (Australia) Will Power | -25 | +16 |
| 6 | (United Kingdom) Dan Wheldon | -27 | -1 |
| 7 | (Brazil) Enrique Bernoldi | -38 | +3 |
| 8 | (Spain) Oriol Servià | -38 | +2 |
| 9 | (United States) Ed Carpenter | -42 | -3 |
| 10 | (United States) Graham Rahal | -42 | +2 |

=== Champ Car World Series points standings ===
Final 2008 CCWS Standings
| Pos. | Driver | Result | Pts. |
|---|---|---|---|
| 1 | (Australia) Will Power | 1 | 31 |
| 2 | (France) Franck Montagny (R) | 2 | 27 |
| 3 | (Mexico) Mario Domínguez | 3 | 25 |
| 4 | (Brazil) Enrique Bernoldi (R) | 4 | 23 |
| 5 | (Spain) Oriol Servià | 5 | 21 |
| 6 | (France) Franck Perera (R) | 6 | 19 |
| 7 | (Canada) Alex Tagliani | 7 | 17 |
| 8 | (Mexico) David Martínez (R) | 8 | 16 |
| 9 | (Venezuela) E. J. Viso (R) | 9 | 13 |
| 10 | (United States) Jimmy Vasser | 10 | 11 |
| 11 | (Canada) Paul Tracy | 11 | 11 |
| 12 | (Brazil) Bruno Junqueira | 12 | 9 |
| 13 | (United States) Graham Rahal | 13 | 8 |
| 14 | (United States) Alex Figge | 14 | 7 |
| 15 | (France) Nelson Philippe | 15 | 6 |
| 16 | (Brazil) Antônio Pizzonia (R) | 16 | 6 |
| 17 | (Brazil) Roberto Moreno | 17 | 4 |
| 18 | (Finland) Juho Annala (R) | 18 | 3 |
| 19 | (United Kingdom) Justin Wilson | 19 | 3 |
| 20 | (Brazil) Mario Moraes (R) | 20 | 1 |

| Preceded by 2008 Honda Grand Prix of St. Petersburg; Indy Japan 300 (IRL teams; 3A) | IRL IndyCar Series round 3B; 2008 | Succeeded by 2008 RoadRunner Turbo Indy 300 |
| Preceded by 2007 Toyota Grand Prix of Long Beach | Grand Prix of Long Beach | Succeeded by 2009 Toyota Grand Prix of Long Beach |
