= 2010 Indianapolis 500 =

American motor race

94th Indianapolis 500

Indianapolis Motor Speedway

Indianapolis 500
- Sanctioning body: Indy Racing League
- Season: 2010 IndyCar season
- Date: May 30, 2010
- Winner: (United Kingdom) Dario Franchitti
- Winning team: Target Chip Ganassi Racing
- Winning Chief Mechanic: Kevin O'Donnell
- Time of race: 3:05:37.0131
- Average speed: 161.623 mph (260.107 km/h)
- Pole position: (Brazil) Hélio Castroneves
- Pole speed: 227.970 mph (366.882 km/h)
- Fastest qualifier: (Brazil) Hélio Castroneves
- Rookie of the Year: (Switzerland) Simona de Silvestro
- Most laps led: (United Kingdom) Dario Franchitti (155)

Pre-race ceremonies
- National anthem: Jewel
- "Back Home Again in Indiana": Jim Nabors
- Starting command: Mari Hulman George
- Pace car: Chevrolet Camaro SS
- Pace car driver: Robin Roberts
- Two-seater: Michael Andretti (driver); Mark Wahlberg (passenger)
- Starter: Paul Blevin
- Honorary starter: Jack Nicholson
- Estimated attendance: 300,000 + (est.)

Television in the United States
- Network: ABC
- Announcers: Marty Reid; Scott Goodyear; Eddie Cheever, Jr.
- Nielsen ratings: 3.6, 4.0 overnight / 10

Chronology
Previous	Next
2009	2011

The 94th Indianapolis 500 was held at the Indianapolis Motor Speedway in Speedway, Indiana on Sunday, May 30, 2010. It was the 15th Indy 500 sanctioned by the Indy Racing League, and was the premier event of the 2010 IZOD IndyCar Series season. The race was won by Dario Franchitti, ahead of Dan Wheldon and Marco Andretti. Tony Kanaan, who had started in the final position, ran as high as second during the race before finishing eleventh.

The race came down to fuel mileage strategy. A caution on laps 161–165 left at least 35 laps for the final fuel stint for most of the leaders. Four drivers (Mike Conway, Justin Wilson, Helio Castroneves, and Graham Rahal) did not pit during that yellow flag, gambling on another caution, and possibly making it to the finish without another pit stop. Their strategies failed to pay off, and each of the four had to pit for fuel. Dario Franchitti, himself desperately conserving fuel, cycled to the front on lap 192. A terrible crash involving Mike Conway, Ryan Hunter-Reay, and others, occurred in the north shortchute as the leaders were taking the white flag. Conway's car launched into the catchfence, and he suffered a broken leg and a compression fracture, but he would later recover. Franchitti took the checkered flag, with Dan Wheldon finishing second for the second year in a row.

The race was the second of the three-year-long Centennial era, celebrating the 100th anniversary of the opening of the track (1909) and the 100th anniversary of the inaugural race in 1911. It was the 53rd time the race had been held on a May 30. This year marked the first race with four female drivers (repeated in 2011), and Simona de Silvestro was awarded Rookie of the Year. The race is also remembered for a dramatic Bump Day where rookie Sebastian Saavedra made the race while laying in a hospital bed, while veteran driver Paul Tracy missed the field after a last-minute qualifying gamble gone awry.

== Event news ==
Indianapolis Motor Speedway, the race track where the race was held.

- Qualifying for the event reverted to a two-day schedule similar to the system used from 1998 to 2000. Time trials was permanently reduced from two weekends down to one weekend. Prior to 1998, and again from 2001 to 2008, time trials were held over two weekends.
- The pole position was decided under the new "Fast Nine Shootout", loosely based on the qualifying format used during IndyCar Series road course events. On the first day of time trials (Saturday), from 11:00 a.m. to 4:00 p.m., the first round of qualifying filled positions 1–24. Bumping began as soon as the field was filled to 24 cars. During the final 90 minutes, the top nine cars advanced to a special "shootout" session. The Fast Nine cars erased their earlier times, and were permitted to make up to three attempts each (time permitting) during the special session to determine starting positions 1–9 including the pole position. Cash prizes for the front row were increased from previous years: pole position ($175,000), second place ($75,000), and third place ($50,000).
- The second day of time trials (Sunday) filled positions 24–33. Once the field was filled to 33 cars, bumping began. The slowest overall car in the field, regardless of the day it qualified, was on the "bubble" and could be bumped out. Fast Nine Shootout participants, however, were locked-in and could not be bumped.
- Prior to the start of the race, Michael Andretti drove Mark Wahlberg in a custom-built, two-seat Indy car billed as the "Izod Fastest Seat in Sports". The 1969 Indianapolis 500 winner Mario Andretti coached the two by radio from the IZOD Performance Pit. Andretti and Wahlberg followed four parade cars and led the official pace car and the 33-car starting field on three parade laps. Once the parade cars exited the circuit, the two-seat race car sped around the track at nearly 200 mph (320 km/h) to catch the field from behind as the field took the green flag. This marked the first time in modern history that a driver and passenger joined the field of the Indianapolis 500. It was the first two-man race car on the track since the days of the riding mechanic ended after 1937.
- Five women attempted the Indy 500; four qualified for the event.

=== Rule changes ===
- For the first time, the Honda overtake assist system ("Push-to-pass") was utilized. Each car was permitted 15 presses (18 seconds in duration) with a 10-second recharge time.
- Championship points towards the IndyCar Series championship were awarded to all qualifiers, based on their qualifying position. The pole winner received 15 points, second place 13, third place 12, on down to 3 points for 25th–33rd place. Previously, only the pole position winner received championship bonus point(s).

== Schedule ==
The 2010 schedule was a two-week condensed schedule, but featured only one fewer day of on-track activity compared to 2009.

Race schedule — May 2010
Sun	Mon	Tue	Wed	Thu	Fri	Sat
						1 Kansas
2	3	4	5	6	7	8 Mini-Marathon
9	10	11	12	13	14	15; ROP/Practice
16; ROP/Practice	17; Practice	18; Practice	19; Practice	20; Practice	21; Practice	22; Pole Day
23; Bump Day	24	25	26; Comm. Day	27	28; Carb Day	29; Parade
30; Indy 500	31; Memorial Day					

Color	Notes
Green	Practice
Dark Blue	Time trials
Silver	Race day
Red	Rained out*
Blank	No track activity

* Includes days where track activity
was significantly limited due to rain

ROP — denotes Rookie Orientation Program

Comm. Day — denotes 500 Festival Community Day

== Entry list ==
- See Team and driver chart for further information.

== Practice ==
=== Saturday May 15 ===
- Weather: Partly cloudy, 66 °F (19 °C), intermittent rain showers
- Practice summary: Opening day practice featured veteran practice from noon to 2 p.m., and rookie orientation from 2 to 6 p.m. Hélio Castroneves became the first car out on the track for the month, and set the fastest speed of the day at 226.603 mph (364.682 km/h). Seven rookies participated in rookie orientation, and five veterans took part in refresher tests. Jay Howard (215.039 mph (346.072 km/h)) was the fastest rookie of the day.

May 15, 2010 – Top Practice Speeds
Rank	Car No.	Driver	Team	Best Speed
1	3T	(Brazil) Hélio Castroneves	Team Penske	226.603 mph (365 km/h)
2	10T	(United Kingdom) Dario Franchitti	Chip Ganassi Racing	226.535 mph (365 km/h)
3	9T	(New Zealand) Scott Dixon	Chip Ganassi Racing	226.237 mph (364 km/h)
OFFICIAL REPORT

=== Sunday May 16 ===
- Weather: Cloudy, 60 °F (16 °C), intermittent rain showers
- Practice summary: The second day of practice featured rookie orientation from 11 a.m. to 3 p.m., and veteran practice from 3 to 6 p.m. Six rookies passed their four-phase rookie tests. During veteran practice, two incidents were reported. Ryan Hunter-Reay spun in the warm up lane in turn one, but did not make contact. At 4:25 p.m. Dan Wheldon lost control in turn four and hit the outside wall at the exit of turn four. he was uninjured. Hélio Castroneves led the speed chart for the second day in a row.

May 16, 2010 – Top Practice Speeds
Rank	Car No.	Driver	Team	Best Speed
1	3	(Brazil) Hélio Castroneves	Team Penske	227.046 mph (365 km/h)
2	9	(New Zealand) Scott Dixon	Chip Ganassi Racing	226.202 mph (364 km/h)
3	10	(United Kingdom) Dario Franchitti	Chip Ganassi Racing	226.044 mph (364 km/h)
OFFICIAL REPORT

=== Monday May 17 ===
- Weather: Rain, 54 °F (12 °C)
- Practice summary: Practice was cancelled due to rain.

=== Tuesday May 18 ===
- Weather: Cloudy, 57 °F (14 °C), intermittent rain showers
- Practice summary: Five different teams comprised the top five positions on the speed chart. Late in the day E. J. Viso crashed in turn one, and was transported to the hospital with back pain.

May 18, 2010 – Top Practice Speeds
Rank	Car No.	Driver	Team	Best Speed
1	9	(New Zealand) Scott Dixon	Chip Ganassi Racing	226.549 mph (365 km/h)
2	32	(Brazil) Mario Moraes	KV Racing Technology	225.913 mph (364 km/h)
3	26	(United States) Marco Andretti	Andretti Autosport	225.751 mph (363 km/h)
OFFICIAL REPORT

=== Wednesday May 19 ===
- Weather: Cloudy, 63 °F (17 °C)
- Practice summary: Thirty-four drivers took practice laps, with many working on race set-ups. The field completed 2,282 laps with no major incidents reported.

May 19, 2010 – Top Practice Speeds
Rank	Car No.	Driver	Team	Best Speed
1	9	(New Zealand) Scott Dixon	Chip Ganassi Racing	226.971 mph (365 km/h)
2	6	(Australia) Ryan Briscoe	Team Penske	226.633 mph (365 km/h)
3	77	(Canada) Alex Tagliani	FAZZT Race Team	226.002 mph (364 km/h)
OFFICIAL REPORT

=== Thursday May 20 ===
- Weather: Partly cloudy, 68 °F (20 °C)
- Practice summary: A total of 44 cars are currently at the Speedway, and 44 have passed technical inspection. Thirty-seven drivers have been on the track to date and turned 1,445 laps today and 7,289 laps this month. Alex Lloyd turned 81 laps today, more than any other driver. There were two cautions for a total of two hours, 35 minutes.

May 20, 2010 – Top Practice Speeds
Rank	Car No.	Driver	Team	Best Speed
1	11	(Brazil) Tony Kanaan	Andretti Autosport	226.775 mph (365 km/h)
2	15	(Canada) Paul Tracy	KV Racing Technology	226.322 mph (364 km/h)
3	06	(Japan) Hideki Mutoh	Newman/Haas Racing	226.230 mph (364 km/h)
OFFICIAL REPORT

=== Friday May 21 – Fast Friday ===
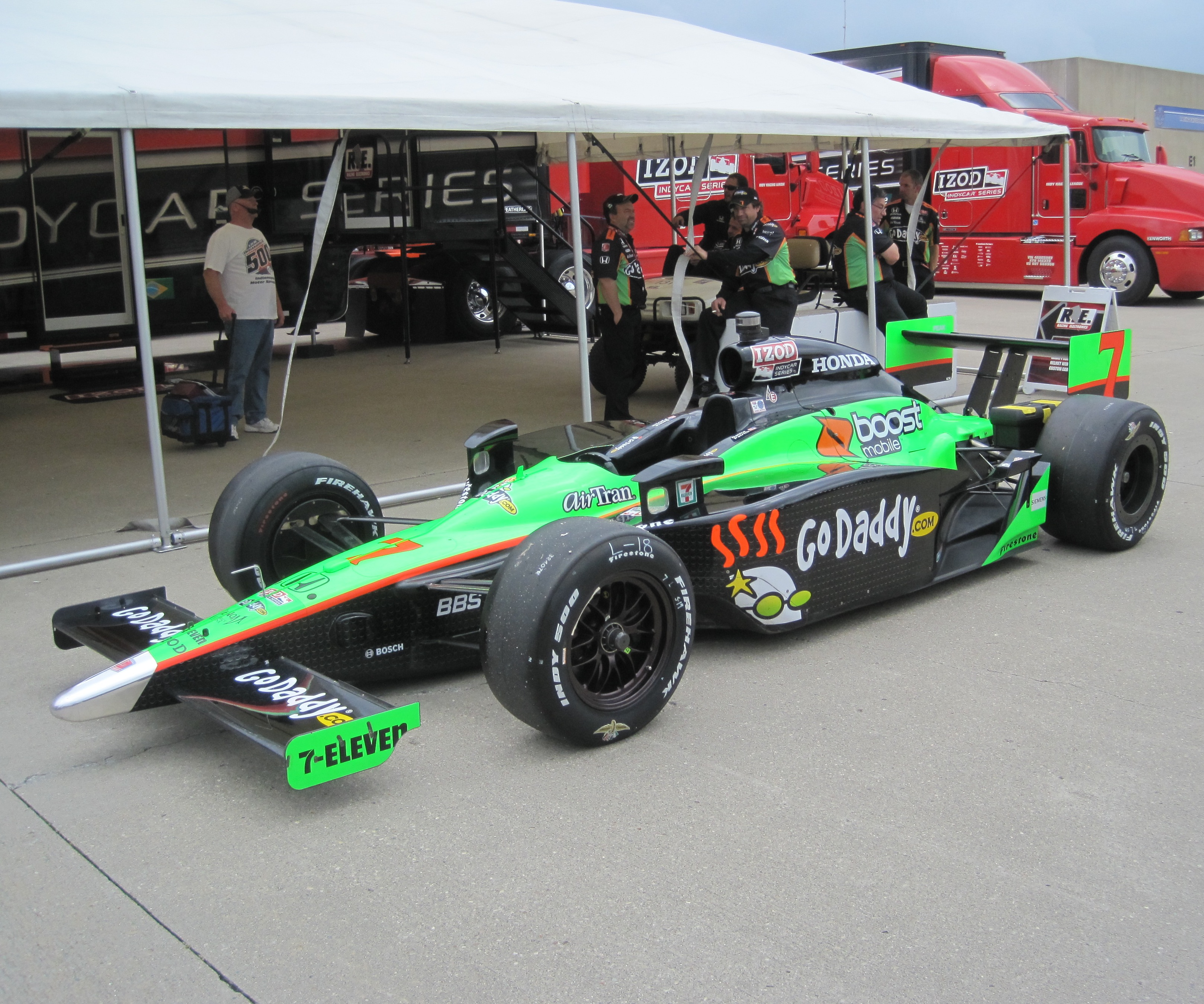
Danica Patrick's car on Fast Friday.

- Weather: Cloudy, 70 °F (21 °C)
- Practice summary: All 36 drivers today were separated by .7745 of a second. Fifteen drivers turned laps of 225 mph (362 km/h) or faster today.

May 21, 2010 – Top Practice Speeds
Rank	Car No.	Driver	Team	Best Speed
1	3	(Brazil) Hélio Castroneves	Team Penske	226.558 mph (365 km/h)
2	12	(Australia) Will Power	Team Penske	226.429 mph (364 km/h)
3	77	(Canada) Alex Tagliani	FAZZT Race Team	226.153 mph (364 km/h)
OFFICIAL REPORT

== Qualifying ==
=== Saturday May 22 – Pole Day ===
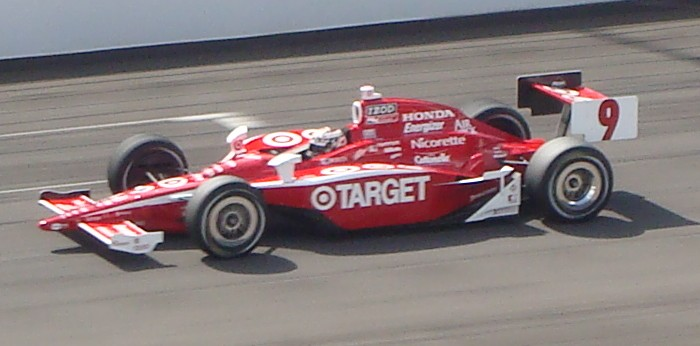
Scott Dixon qualifies during the "shootout" segment. Dixon qualified for the sixth starting position.

- Weather: Partly cloudy, 77 °F (25 °C)
- Pole Day summary: Pole Day 2010 opened up with A. J. Foyt IV and many others through the early part of the day. Andretti Autosport struggled through the most part of the day with Marco Andretti finishing in the middle part of the qualifiers and Danica Patrick who finished 23rd of all 24 drivers qualified. John Andretti failed to qualify, while Tony Kanaan crashed during his qualifying run splitting his engine in two. The new system was put into place that year with 24 drivers qualified, while still vulnerable to being bumped. The top nine drivers, in this case Hélio Castroneves, Will Power, Dario Franchitti, Ryan Briscoe, Alex Tagliani, Scott Dixon, Graham Rahal, Ed Carpenter, Hideki Mutoh, were all involved in a shootout for the pole position. The drivers' times were wiped out and each made one or more four-lap qualification attempts. The shootout lasted from 4:30 pm to 6:00 pm allowing the drivers to make as many qualification attempts as they wanted in the time available. Unlike the main portion of qualifying, during the shootout segment drivers did not have to withdraw previous qualification times to make another attempt; the fastest time for each driver during the shootout segment was used to order the drivers. Hélio Castroneves not only won the first session of qualifying, but also the shootout and the 2010 Indianapolis 500 pole position.

Pole Day – Saturday, May 22, 2010
Rank	Car No.	Driver	Team	Qualifying Speed	Points
"Shootout" competitors (positions 1–9)
1	3	(Brazil) Hélio Castroneves	Team Penske	227.970 mph (367 km/h)	15
2	12	(Australia) Will Power	Team Penske	227.578 mph (366 km/h)	13
3	10	(United Kingdom) Dario Franchitti	Chip Ganassi Racing	226.990 mph (365 km/h)	12
4	6	(Australia) Ryan Briscoe	Team Penske	226.554 mph (365 km/h)	11
5	77	(Canada) Alex Tagliani	FAZZT Race Team	226.390 mph (364 km/h)	10
6	9	(New Zealand) Scott Dixon	Chip Ganassi Racing	226.233 mph (364 km/h)	9
7	30	(United States) Graham Rahal	Rahal Letterman Racing	225.519 mph (363 km/h)	8
8	20	(United States) Ed Carpenter	Panther Racing	224.507 mph (361 km/h)	7
9	06	(Japan) Hideki Mutoh	Newman/Haas Racing	223.487 mph (360 km/h)	6
Positions 10–24
10	99	(United States) Townsend Bell	Sam Schmidt Motorsports	225.097 mph (362 km/h)	4
11	22	(United Kingdom) Justin Wilson	Dreyer & Reinbold Racing	225.050 mph (362 km/h)	4
12	2	(Brazil) Raphael Matos	De Ferran Dragon Racing	225.028 mph (362 km/h)	4
13	32	(Brazil) Mario Moraes	KV Racing Technology	224.888 mph (362 km/h)	4
14	21	(United States) Davey Hamilton	De Ferran Dragon Racing	224.852 mph (362 km/h)	4
15	24	(United Kingdom) Mike Conway	Dreyer & Reinbold Racing	224.583 mph (361 km/h)	4
16	26	(United States) Marco Andretti	Andretti Autosport	224.575 mph (361 km/h)	4
17	37	(United States) Ryan Hunter-Reay	Andretti Autosport	224.547 mph (361 km/h)	4
18	4	(United Kingdom) Dan Wheldon	Panther Racing	224.464 mph (361 km/h)	4
19	8	(Venezuela) E. J. Viso	KV Racing Technology	224.380 mph (361 km/h)	4
20	23	(South Africa) Tomas Scheckter	Dreyer & Reinbold Racing	224.261 mph (361 km/h)	4
21	25	(Brazil) Ana Beatriz R	Dreyer & Reinbold Racing	224.243 mph (361 km/h)	4
22	78	(Switzerland) Simona de Silvestro R	HVM Racing	224.228 mph (361 km/h)	4
23	7	(United States) Danica Patrick	Andretti Autosport	224.217 mph (361 km/h)	4
24	36	(Belgium) Bertrand Baguette R	Conquest Racing	224.189 mph (361 km/h)	4
OFFICIAL REPORT

=== Sunday May 23 – Bump Day ===
- Weather: Sunny, 87 °F (31 °C)
- Bump Day summary: With 24 drivers qualified the previous day, the field started the day with nine spots open. In the morning practice session, Tony Kanaan suffered his second crash in two days. He suffered a nearly identical crash as Saturday in turn one, this time wrecking his back up car. Kanaan was uninjured, and the team was forced to repair the backup car, or Kanaan could possibly miss the race.

Time trials opened at 12:00 p.m., with several cars ready in the qualifying line. In the first hour, early runs filled the field to 33 cars. Several drivers put in safe speeds, including John Andretti, Sarah Fisher, Vítor Meira, Alex Lloyd and Bruno Junqueira. Junqueira was the fastest of the day, and his speed of 225.662 mph ranked 7th-fastest overall in the field. A. J. Foyt IV parted ways with his grandfather's team and Jaques Lazier was drafted as his replacement. As of 1 p.m., the Bump Day qualifiers were as follows:

Pos.	Driver	Speed	Notes
25	Bruno Junqueira	225.662 mph	
26	Alex Lloyd	224.783 mph	
27	John Andretti	224.518 mph	
28	Sarah Fisher	224.434 mph	
29	Vítor Meira	224.388 mph	
30	Paul Tracy	223.892 mph	
31	Jay Howard	223.824 mph	
32	Mario Romancini	223.805 mph	
33	Sebastián Saavedra	223.634 mph	On the "Bubble"
Non-qualifiers
34	Takuma Sato	221.622 mph	Bumped
—	Milka Duno	No Speed	Wave off
—	Tony Kanaan	No Speed	No Attempt
—	Jaques Lazier	No Speed	No Attempt

At about 1:10 p.m., a break in the qualifying line occurred, and the track was opened up for general practice. The temperature was rising into the low 90s °F, and the track temperature was measured at about 118 °F. Most drivers stayed off of the track during the hottest period of the afternoon, awaiting better conditions. At 4:50 p.m., during a practice run, Sebastián Saavedra wrecked his already-qualified car. Saavedra was sent to the hospital, and if he were to be bumped, he would not be able to re-qualify.

At 5:23 p.m., Tony Kanaan took to the track in his repaired back-up car. Kanaan bumped his way into the field with a speed of 224.072 mph. Kanaan bumped Sebastián Saavedra of Bryan Herta Autosport from the field. Saavedra experienced trouble of his own, as he wrecked his car during a practice run about at 4:50 p.m. Sunday afternoon. Saavedra was sent to the hospital, and would be unable to re-qualify. As of 5:30 p.m., Romancini was now on the bubble. As of approximately 5:30 p.m., the Bump Day qualifiers were as follows:

Pos.	Driver	Speed	Notes
25	Bruno Junqueira	225.662 mph	
26	Alex Lloyd	224.783 mph	
27	John Andretti	224.518 mph	
28	Sarah Fisher	224.434 mph	
29	Vítor Meira	224.388 mph	
30	Tony Kanaan	224.072 mph	
31	Paul Tracy	223.892 mph	
32	Jay Howard	223.824 mph	
33	Mario Romancini	223.805 mph	On the "Bubble"
Non-qualifiers
34	Sebastián Saavedra	223.634 mph	Bumped
35	Jaques Lazier	223.360 mph	Too slow
36	Takuma Sato	221.622 mph	Bumped
—	Milka Duno	No Speed	Wave off

At 5:33 p.m. Mario Romancini's team withdrew his speed, which momentarily re-instated Sebastián Saavedra to 33rd position. Romancini's new speed of 224.641 mph was an improvement, and he was safe in the 27th position. Saavedra was bumped from the lineup once again. With 22 minutes remaining, Jay Howard was now on the bubble. Milka Duno was the next car out, but after two slow laps, she was waved off (her second wave off). Takuma Sato was the next car out. Sato's speed of 224.178 mph bumped Howard from the field. Paul Tracy was now on the bubble. At 5:45 p.m. (fifteen minutes left in the day), the Bump Day qualifiers were as follows:

Pos.	Driver	Speed	Notes
25	Bruno Junqueira	225.662 mph	
26	Alex Lloyd	224.783 mph	
27	Mario Romancini	224.641 mph	2nd attempt
28	John Andretti	224.518 mph	
29	Sarah Fisher	224.434 mph	
30	Vítor Meira	224.388 mph	
31	Takuma Sato	224.178 mph	2nd attempt
32	Tony Kanaan	224.072 mph	
33	Paul Tracy	223.892 mph	On the "Bubble"
Non-qualifiers
34	Jay Howard	223.824 mph	Bumped
35	Sebastián Saavedra	223.634 mph	Bumped
36	Jaques Lazier	223.360 mph	Too slow
—	Milka Duno	No Speed	Wave off

Jay Howard attempted to bump his way back into the field, but his speed of 223.610 mph was too slow. Since Howard had made his second attempt without formally withdrawing his original speed, he reverted to his 223.824 mph speed from the first attempt. For the moment, he was still 34th-fastest. Paul Tracy still clung to the 33rd position. Some confusion arose with online timing and scoring and on the Versus television broadcast as to who was on the bubble, and what speed Howard was being credited with. However, officials on pit lane had the situation under control. In a surprising move, Tracy's team withdrew his speed at 5:50 p.m. Tracy hoped to put in a safer speed, and at the same time, run out the clock to prevent Howard from getting another chance to qualify.

Tracy's withdraw tentatively re-instated Jay Howard (223.824 mph) to the 33rd position. Tracy, however, got very loose in the hot conditions, and his speed ended up being slower. He waved off after only two laps, and hurriedly got back into the qualifying line. After quick wave-offs by Jaques Lazier and Milka Duno, time was running out. Sensing they were finally safe, Tony Kanaan's crew pulled their car out of line. Howard was now at the front of the qualifying line with Tracy second in line. With three minutes left in the session, the last row of the field consisted of the following drivers:

Pos.	Driver	Speed	Notes
31	Takuma Sato	224.178 mph	
32	Tony Kanaan	224.072 mph	
33	Jay Howard	223.824 mph	On the "Bubble"
Non-qualifiers
34	Sebastián Saavedra	223.634 mph	Bumped
—	Paul Tracy	No Speed	Withdrew
—	Jaques Lazier	No Speed	Wave off
—	Milka Duno	No Speed	Wave off

With less than two minutes to go, Jay Howard's team formally withdrew his speed and he pulled away for his third and final attempt. Howard was trying to use up time and keep Tracy off the track, but at the same time, was now tasked with bumping his way back into the lineup. The move re-instated Sebastián Saavedra's car to 33rd position. Howard's effort, however, was too slow. The 6 o'clock gun fired with Tracy still waiting in line. Sebastián Saavedra shockingly made the field while he was lying in a hospital bed. For the shoestring budget Bryan Herta Autosport team, the day (which coincidentally was Bryan Herta's 40th birthday), was remembered as the "Bump Day Miracle".

Milka Duno made three attempts during the afternoon, and none were run to completion. Jaques Lazier, who was a last-minute replacement at the Foyt team, failed to reach the necessary speed in his three attempts. On his last attempt, Lazier's car was so loose, he nearly crashed in turn three on his warm-up lap. Howard and Tracy, however, were the heartbreak stories of the day. After qualifying closed, Andretti Autosport decided to replace Tony Kanaan's qualified back-up car with the primary machine. The decision forced Kanaan to move to the 33rd position, but since he had qualified 32nd, it was a drop of only one spot on the grid.

Bump Day – Sunday, May 23, 2010
Rank	Car No.	Driver	Team	Qualifying Speed	Points
25	33	(Brazil) Bruno Junqueira	FAZZT Race Team	225.662 mph (363 km/h)	3
26	19	(United Kingdom) Alex Lloyd	Dale Coyne Racing	224.783 mph (362 km/h)	3
27	34	(Brazil) Mario Romancini R	Conquest Racing	224.641 mph (362 km/h)	3
28	43	(United States) John Andretti	Andretti Autosport	224.518 mph (361 km/h)	3
29	67	(United States) Sarah Fisher	Sarah Fisher Racing	224.434 mph (361 km/h)	3
30	14	(Brazil) Vítor Meira	A. J. Foyt Enterprises	224.388 mph (361 km/h)	3
31	5	(Japan) Takuma Sato R	KV Racing Technology	224.178 mph (361 km/h)	3
32	11	(Brazil) Tony Kanaan	Andretti Autosport	224.072 mph (361 km/h)	3
33	29	(Colombia) Sebastián Saavedra R	Bryan Herta Autosport	223.634 mph (360 km/h)	3
OFFICIAL REPORT

== Carb Day ==
=== Indianapolis 500 Final Practice – Friday May 28 ===
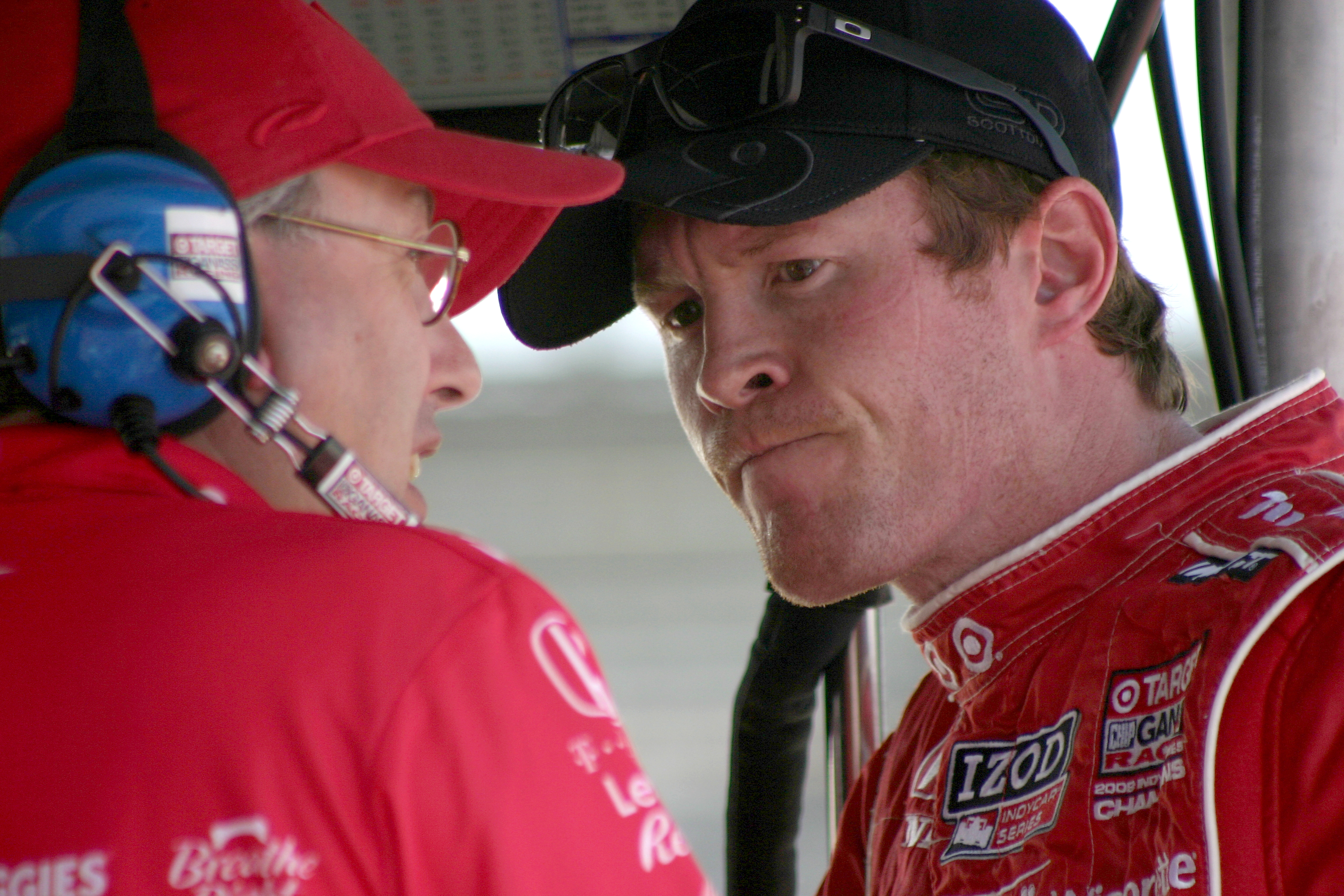
Scott Dixon at Carb Day at Indianapolis Motor Speedway in 2010

- Weather: Sunny, 82 °F (28 °C)
- Practice summary: An hour-long practice from 11:00 am to 12:00 pm. This practice was the final one until the running of the Indianapolis 500 on Sunday. All 33 cars that qualified ran in this practice session.

=== Pit Stop Challenge ===
The 33rd annual Pit Stop Challenge was held on Friday May 28. Hélio Castroneves (Team Penske) defeated Hideki Mutoh (Newman/Haas Racing) in the final round.

First Round
9	Scott Dixon (Chip Ganassi Racing)	9.462
12	Will Power (Team Penske)	7.968
37	Ryan Hunter-Reay (Andretti Autosport)	DNF
11	Tony Kanaan (Andretti Autosport)	11.833
06	Hideki Mutoh (Newman/Haas)	8.875
4	Dan Wheldon (Panther Racing)	9.622
22	Justin Wilson (Dreyer & Reinbold)	8.408
10	Dario Franchitti (Chip Ganassi Racing)	8.801

Quarterfinals
7	Danica Patrick (Andretti Autosport)	8.855
12	Will Power (Team Penske)	9.517
3	Hélio Castroneves (Team Penske)	8.558
11	Tony Kanaan (Andretti Autosport)	9.296
6	Ryan Briscoe (Team Penske)	9.628
06	Hideki Mutoh (Newman/Haas)	8.858
22	Justin Wilson (Dreyer & Reinbold)	8.097
26	Marco Andretti (Andretti Autosport)	9.210

Semifinals
7	Danica Patrick (Andretti Autosport)
3	Hélio Castroneves (Team Penske)
06	Hideki Mutoh (Newman/Haas)	8.296
22	Justin Wilson (Dreyer & Reinbold)	9.255

Finals
3	Hélio Castroneves (Team Penske)	8.001
06	Hideki Mutoh (Newman/Haas)	9.547

== Starting grid ==
Row	Inside		Middle		Outside	
1	3	(Brazil) Hélio Castroneves W	12	(Australia) Will Power	10	(United Kingdom) Dario Franchitti W
2	6	(Australia) Ryan Briscoe	77	(Canada) Alex Tagliani	9	(New Zealand) Scott Dixon W
3	30	(United States) Graham Rahal	20	(United States) Ed Carpenter	06	(Japan) Hideki Mutoh
4	99	(United States) Townsend Bell	22	(United Kingdom) Justin Wilson	2	(Brazil) Raphael Matos
5	32	(Brazil) Mario Moraes	21	(United States) Davey Hamilton	24	(United Kingdom) Mike Conway
6	26	(United States) Marco Andretti	37	(United States) Ryan Hunter-Reay	4	(United Kingdom) Dan Wheldon W
7	8	(Venezuela) E. J. Viso	23	(South Africa) Tomas Scheckter	25	(Brazil) Ana Beatriz R
8	78	(Switzerland) Simona de Silvestro R	7	(United States) Danica Patrick	36	(Belgium) Bertrand Baguette R
9	33	(Brazil) Bruno Junqueira	19	(United Kingdom) Alex Lloyd	34	(Brazil) Mario Romancini R
10	43	(United States) John Andretti	67	(United States) Sarah Fisher	14	(Brazil) Vítor Meira
11	5	(Japan) Takuma Sato R	29	(Colombia) Sebastián Saavedra R	11	(Brazil) Tony Kanaan*

- W = Former Indianapolis 500 winner
- R = Indianapolis 500 rookie
- (*) Tony Kanaan moved to the last starting position due to changes to the car

Failed to qualify

No.	Driver	Team	Reason
15	(Canada) Paul Tracy	KV Racing Technology	Withdrew speed. Too slow to bump back into the field.
18	(Venezuela) Milka Duno	Dale Coyne Racing	Three qualifying attempts. None run to completion.
41	(United States) A. J. Foyt IV (United States) Jaques Lazier	A. J. Foyt Enterprises	A. J. Foyt IV quit the team as a result of an argument with his grandfather regarding the car's setup. Immediately after, Jaques Lazier desperately attempted to re-qualify the car on bump-day, but was too slow.
66	(United Kingdom) Jay Howard R	Sarah Fisher Racing	Withdrew speed. Too slow to bump back into the field.

== Race summary ==
- Race Weather: Sunny and clear, 87 °F (31 °C)
- Race Start Time: 1:00 pm EDT

=== Start ===
After the traditional starting command by Mari Hulman George, the pace car, driven by Robin Roberts, led the cars through the pace laps, followed by a special two-seater car driven by Michael Andretti and carrying Mark Wahlberg. Once the pace car came off the field, the two-seater sped around to join the back of the field, and honorary starter Jack Nicholson waved the green flag to start the race. (Nicholson refused to leave the flagstand and waved the green flag on the first two restarts, on laps 5 and 12.)

On the first lap, Davey Hamilton spun on turn two, bringing out the yellow flag. Hamilton blamed Tomas Scheckter, who had narrowly passed Hamilton on the outside, forcing Hamilton to correct. "Tomas Scheckter's an idiot... You know, he does it every year. I mean, it's not a surprise with him, and he gets away with it," said Hamilton. In just the half-lap of green-flag racing, however, Dario Franchitti had taken the lead, while Tony Kanaan had moved from the 33rd, final starting position to 25th.

The race returned to green-flag racing on lap 5, but a spin by Bruno Junqueira brought out another caution for laps 8–11. By this time, Kanaan had moved up to 17th.

=== First half ===
Franchitti held the lead for a long period of green-flag racing, until Will Power passed him for the lead on lap 31. However, on a pit stop, Power left before the fuel hose had been completely detached, leaving a coil dangling from his car. This would lead to a pit drive-through penalty for Power, dropping Power to 25th, as well as a caution period for debris as part of the coil fell onto the track. While Power would repeatedly work his way towards the front of the field, additional pit problems later in the race would lead to only an 8th-place finish.

Franchitti would maintain his lead beyond the halfway point of the race. Meanwhile, John Andretti spun into the wall on lap 65, and on the ensuing round of yellow-flag pit stops, both Scott Dixon and Raphael Matos lost wheels while pulling out and had to return to their pits. Kanaan improved eight spots, from 12th to 4th, on the same round of pit stops. Matos's race did not last much longer, as he spun into the wall on lap 73.

=== Second half ===
Vítor Meira hit the turn two wall in lap 106, bringing out the race's next caution. Ed Carpenter, who had been running well, had to come into the pits before they were officially open to avoid running out of fuel, but the rules then required him to come in again once the pits were open, costing him several spots. While most drivers came into the pits on the yellow, Tomas Scheckter stayed out, briefly taking the lead, but Franchitti quickly took it back after the race returned to green-flag status.

A long stretch of green-flag racing followed. Kanaan passed Hélio Castroneves and Scheckter to take the second spot, but Franchitti pulled away and had a lead of 9.7 seconds over Kanaan by lap 142. A series of green-flag pits on laps 143–147 resulted in Marco Andretti and Ryan Briscoe briefly taking the lead, in turn, before they had to pit and Franchitti re-emerged as the leader, with Andretti Autosport teammates Andretti and Kanaan in second and third, respectively. On the same round of pits, Castroneves stalled his car leaving the pits, dropping him from third to sixteenth. Continuing Penske Racing's problems, Briscoe crashed into the turn four wall on lap 148. Most drivers stayed out during this caution, but Castroneves pitted, hoping that there would be enough additional laps under caution to extend his fuel mileage and allow him to finish the race without pitting again. Kanaan passed Andretti under the following green flag to retake the second position.

=== Finish ===
A spin by rookie Sebastián Saavedra on lap 161 brought out another caution, and most drivers came into the pits, but Mike Conway, Justin Wilson, Castroneves, and Graham Rahal all stayed out, taking the top four spots, respectively. In the end, none of the four had enough fuel to complete the race and all had to pit before the end of the race under a green flag, giving Franchitti the lead again on lap 192, with Kanaan again in second. Kanaan's hopes for a "worst-to-first" race came to an end on lap 196 when he had to come in for additional fuel.

Franchitti slowed in the final laps to conserve fuel, but he was still able to stay ahead of second-place Dan Wheldon, who was also trying to save fuel. A dramatic crash occurred in the final lap as Ryan Hunter-Reay ran out of fuel and slowed, and Mike Conway hit Hunter-Reay's car, flipping Conway's car and sending it airborne and into the protective fence, shattering the car. Conway's teammate Ana Beatriz spun into the inside wall while avoiding the crash ahead of her. This brought out a final caution, and Franchitti led the field to the checkered flag, winning his second Indianapolis 500.

Conway was airlifted to nearby Methodist Hospital with a broken lower left leg. Of the crash, Hunter-Reay said, "I'm sorry Mike is hurt... It was totally uncalled for. We weren't going to make it anyway. When you run out of fuel in these cars, it's like hitting the brakes. In hindsight, we should have stopped for fuel." It was the only multi-car crash of the race. Two spectators were treated for minor injuries from the crash. ESPN SportsCenter and ESPN'S NASCAR Now program reported on May 31, 2010, Conway also suffered compression to his lower back and suffered a bad fracture to one of his vertebrae in his neck.

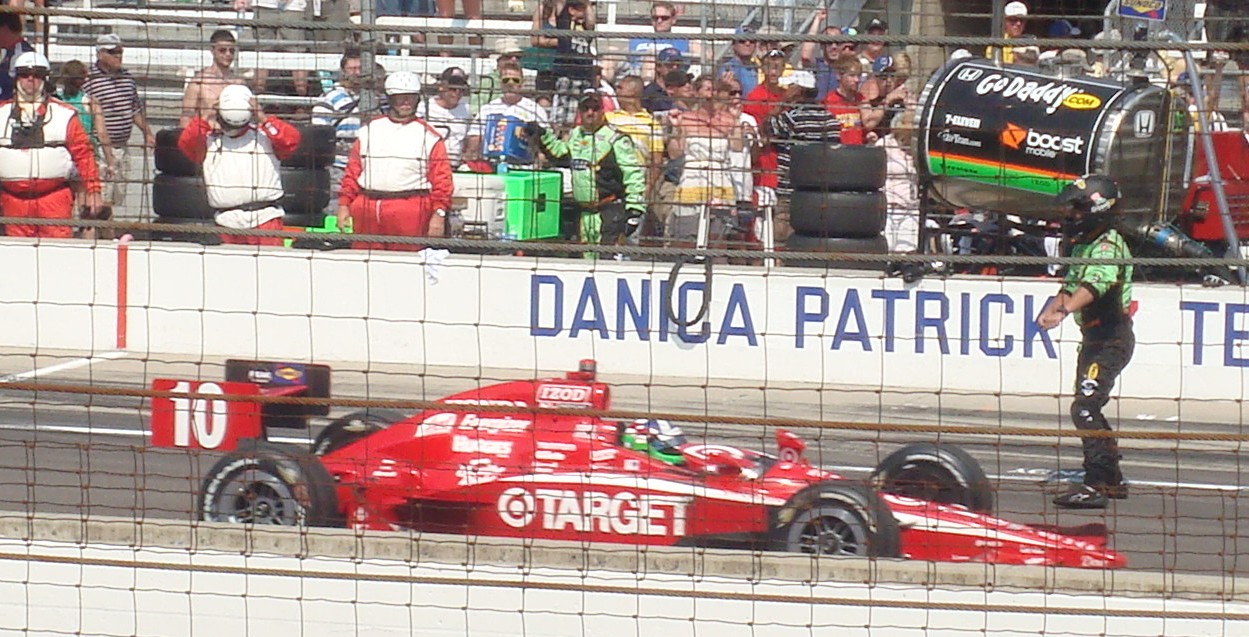
Dario Franchitti heads through the pits towards Victory Lane after winning.

After skulling the traditional bottle of milk for the winner, Franchitti stated "this tastes just as good the second time", referring to his victory in the 2007 race. Franchitti led for 155 of the race's 200 laps. He survived the final 36 laps without taking a pit stop.

=== Post-race summary ===
Franchitti's team's owner, Chip Ganassi had already won the Daytona 500 with Jamie McMurray. When McMurray won the Brickyard 400 at Indianapolis, Ganassi became the first owner to win the Daytona 500, Indy 500, and Brickyard 400 in the same season. The Harley J. Earl Trophy had been brought to the Indianapolis Motor Speedway—the first time it had ever been away from Daytona—and it stood side by side with the Borg-Warner Trophy.

Dan Wheldon finished second. In a post-race interview, he suggested that it was a mistake to be as conservative as he was on fuel: "I could see [Franchitti] at the end... unfortunately, I should have kept going 'cause I had fuel in the car when it came into the pits." However, Franchitti also had additional fuel, with 1.6 gallons remaining in his tank at the end of the race, even after taking a cool-down lap. It was the second consecutive second-place finish for Wheldon at the Indianapolis 500, and, along with Vítor Meira's finish in 2008, the third for Panther Racing.

Marco Andretti was initially reported to have finished sixth, but a post-race review revealed that three drivers had passed him during the final caution period, and he was restored to third place in the official race results, giving him his third top-three finish in five starts at the Indianapolis 500. The same review also revealed that Simona de Silvestro passed Mario Romancini after the caution came out, making Romancini, not de Silvestro, the highest finishing rookie, at 13th. Marco Andretti was one of the three Andretti Autosport drivers (out of the team's five entries) to finish in the top eleven, even though none of the Andretti drivers had qualified higher than sixteenth. As late as lap 191, four of the Andretti drivers had been in the top nine. Also among the Andretti drivers was Danica Patrick; starting twenty-third and finishing sixth, she scored the highest placement of the four female drivers in the race.

Hélio Castroneves, who started from the pole and was considered a pre-race favorite, finished ninth after his problematic pit stop, and his late-race fuel strategy failed to pan out. Castroneves praised Franchitti and took responsibility for his own finish, saying "I have to say, Dario was dominant. But this was the first time I feel like I let my guys down. We didn't have the best car, but we were better than ninth, certainly."

Tony Kanaan, who had started in last place and had run as high as second, finished eleventh after he had to pit for a final splash of fuel, but still garnered much applause from nearby fans as he exited his car after the race. Kanaan praised former teammate Franchitti: "The best car and the best driver today won the race."

== Box score ==
Rank	No.	Driver	Team	Chassis	Engine	Laps	Status	Grid	Points
1	10	(United Kingdom) Dario Franchitti W	Chip Ganassi Racing	Dallara	Honda	200	161.623 mph	3	52
2	4	(United Kingdom) Dan Wheldon W	Panther Racing	Dallara	Honda	200	+0.1536	18	40
3	26	(United States) Marco Andretti	Andretti Autosport	Dallara	Honda	200	+23.5251	16	35
4	19	(United Kingdom) Alex Lloyd	Dale Coyne Racing	Dallara	Honda	200	+20.9876*	26	32
5	9	(New Zealand) Scott Dixon W	Chip Ganassi Racing	Dallara	Honda	200	+21.4922*	6	30
6	7	(United States) Danica Patrick	Andretti Autosport	Dallara	Honda	200	+21.7560*	23	28
7	22	(United Kingdom) Justin Wilson	Dreyer & Reinbold Racing	Dallara	Honda	200	+25.9761	11	26
8	12	(Australia) Will Power	Team Penske	Dallara	Honda	200	+30.2474	2	24
9	3	(Brazil) Hélio Castroneves W	Team Penske	Dallara	Honda	200	+33.0137	1	22
10	77	(Canada) Alex Tagliani	FAZZT Race Team	Dallara	Honda	200	+34.2482	5	20
11	11	(Brazil) Tony Kanaan	Andretti Autosport	Dallara	Honda	200	+59.5957	33	19
12	30	(United States) Graham Rahal	Rahal Letterman Racing	Dallara	Honda	200	+59.9739	7	18
13	34	(Brazil) Mario Romancini R	Conquest Racing	Dallara	Honda	200	+1:05.0219	27	17
14	78	(Switzerland) Simona de Silvestro R	HVM Racing	Dallara	Honda	200	+1:01.6745*	22	16
15	23	(South Africa) Tomas Scheckter	Dreyer & Reinbold Racing	Dallara	Honda	199	-1 lap	20	15
16	99	(United States) Townsend Bell	Sam Schmidt Motorsports	Dallara	Honda	199	-1 lap	10	14
17	20	(United States) Ed Carpenter	Panther Racing	Dallara	Honda	199	-1 lap	8	13
18	37	(United States) Ryan Hunter-Reay	Andretti Autosport	Dallara	Honda	198	Contact	17	12
19	24	(United Kingdom) Mike Conway	Dreyer & Reinbold Racing	Dallara	Honda	198	Contact	15	12
20	5	(Japan) Takuma Sato R	KV Racing Technology	Dallara	Honda	198	-2 laps	31	12
21	25	(Brazil) Ana Beatriz R	Dreyer & Reinbold Racing	Dallara	Honda	196	Contact	21	12
22	36	(Belgium) Bertrand Baguette R	Conquest Racing	Dallara	Honda	183	-17 laps	24	12
23	29	(Colombia) Sebastián Saavedra R	Bryan Herta Autosport	Dallara	Honda	159	Contact	32	12
24	6	(Australia) Ryan Briscoe	Team Penske	Dallara	Honda	147	Contact	4	12
25	8	(Venezuela) E. J. Viso	KV Racing Technology	Dallara	Honda	139	Contact	19	10
26	67	(United States) Sarah Fisher	Sarah Fisher Racing	Dallara	Honda	125	Contact	29	10
27	14	(Brazil) Vítor Meira	A. J. Foyt Enterprises	Dallara	Honda	105	Contact	30	10
28	06	(Japan) Hideki Mutoh	Newman/Haas Racing	Dallara	Honda	76	Handling	9	10
29	2	(Brazil) Raphael Matos	De Ferran Dragon Racing	Dallara	Honda	72	Contact	12	10
30	43	(United States) John Andretti	Andretti Autosport	Dallara	Honda	62	Contact	28	10
31	32	(Brazil) Mario Moraes	KV Racing Technology	Dallara	Honda	17	Contact	13	10
32	33	(Brazil) Bruno Junqueira	FAZZT Race Team	Dallara	Honda	7	Contact	25	10
33	21	(United States) Davey Hamilton	De Ferran Dragon Racing	Dallara	Honda	0	Contact	14	10

W Former Indianapolis 500 winner

R Indianapolis 500 Rookie

All entrants utilized Firestone tires.

(*) Lloyd, Dixon, Patrick, and de Silvestro's finishing positions were adjusted downward after the race, for passing under yellow.

=== Race statistics ===
Lap Leaders
Laps	Leader
1–30	Dario Franchitti
31–35	Will Power
36	Dario Franchitti
37–38	Ryan Briscoe
39–108	Dario Franchitti
109–113	Tomas Scheckter
114–142	Dario Franchitti
143	Marco Andretti
144–146	Ryan Briscoe
147–162	Dario Franchitti
163–177	Mike Conway
178–188	Justin Wilson
189–191	Hélio Castroneves
192–200	Dario Franchitti

Total laps led
Driver	Laps
Dario Franchitti	155
Mike Conway	15
Justin Wilson	11
Tomas Scheckter	5
Ryan Briscoe	5
Will Power	5
Hélio Castroneves	3
Marco Andretti	1

Cautions: 9 for 44 laps
Laps	Reason
1–4	Davey Hamilton crash in turn 2
8–11	Bruno Junqueira crash in turn 2
39–42	Debris
65–70	John Andretti crash in turn 2
73–78	Raphael Matos crash in turn 1
106–111	Vítor Meira crash on backstretch
148–155	Ryan Briscoe crash in turn 4
161–165	Sebastián Saavedra crash in turn 1
200	Mike Conway, Ryan Hunter-Reay crash in northchute

== Broadcasting ==
=== Television ===
The race was televised in high definition in the United States on ABC, the 46th consecutive year on that network. Marty Reid served as anchor. The telecast utilized the Side-by-Side format for commercial breaks.

"Fast Friday" Practice, Time trials, and Carb Day were shown live in high definition on Versus. Bob Jenkins served as anchor, along with Robbie Buhl and Jon Beekhuis as analysts. Jack Arute, Robbie Floyd, and Lindy Thackston covered the pits.

The race was carried live on TSN and on RDS in Canada, and on ESPN Latin America. In Brazil, the race was carried live on Band TV/BandSports.

ABC Television
Booth Announcers	Pit/garage reporters
Host: Brent Musburger; Announcer: Marty Reid; Color: Scott Goodyear; Color: Eddie Cheever	Vince Welch; Brienne Pedigo; Jamie Little; Rick DeBruhl

=== Radio ===
The race was broadcast on radio by the IMS Radio Network. Mike King served as anchor. For the second time, Paul Page and Bob Jenkins joined the booth to offer commentary and observations. For the first time, the turn one reporting location was eliminated. Jerry Baker instead joined the booth as analyst. The turn one vantage point was eliminated due to the fact that the booth announcers had a clear view of that part of the track, and it allowed better continuity.

The driver expert was Indy Lights competitor James Hinchcliffe, who joined the crew for the first time. For the fourth year in a row, Davey Hamilton was part of the crew serving as live in-car reporter. However, he was involved in a crash at the start of the race, and was unable to give any reports. He instead visited the booth during the race.

Chris Denari, the television voice of the Indiana Fever, covered a Fever game against the Shock Saturday night before the race in Tulsa, Oklahoma. He then drove ten hours overnight back to Indianapolis to make it to the race on time.

For 2010, a special change was made for the famous out-cue "Stay tuned for the greatest spectacle in racing." Rather than just have the chief announcer recite the line, numerous drivers from the starting field were recorded introducing themselves and reciting the cue. Each commercial break attempted to feature a different driver.

Indianapolis Motor Speedway Radio Network
Booth Announcers	Turn Reporters	Pit/garage reporters
Chief Announcer: Mike King; Driver expert: James Hinchcliffe; Analyst: Jerry Baker; Analyst: Paul Page; Historian: Donald Davidson; Live in-car reports: Davey Hamilton; Commentary: Bob Jenkins	Turn 1: not used Turn 2: Jake Query; Turn 3: Mark Jaynes; Turn 4: Chris Denari	Nick Yeoman (north pits); Dave Argabright (center pits); Kevin Lee (south pits); Dave Wilson (garages)

== See also ==
- List of Indianapolis 500 winners
- Indianapolis 500 by year
- Indy Racing League
- IndyCar Series

Previous race: 2010 RoadRunner Turbo Indy 300	IndyCar Series; 2010 season	Next race: 2010 Firestone 550
Previous race: 2009 Indianapolis 500	Indianapolis 500	Next race: 2011 Indianapolis 500
