= List of Indycar races =

The following are lists of American open-wheel car races from 1905 up to and including the 2026 season. The lists include racing events sanctioned by the American Automobile Association (AAA), United States Auto Club (USAC), Championship Auto Racing Teams (CART), Champ Car World Series (CCWS), and Indy Racing League (IRL)/IndyCar.

== Current IndyCar Series races and locations ==
Races sanctioned by IndyCar, includes races to be run during the 2026 IndyCar Series season. Totals under 'Races' and 'Seasons' columns accurate as of the beginning of the 2026 season.

Oval/Speedway
Road course/Street circuit

Event	Track	AAA	USAC	CART/CCWS	IndyCar	Races	Seasons
(United States) Indianapolis 500	Indianapolis Motor Speedway	1911–1916, 1919–1941, 1946–1955	1956–1978	1979–1995	1996–present	109	109
(United States) Snap-on Makers and Fixers / Milwaukee Mile 250	Milwaukee Mile	1937–1939, 1941, 1946–1955	1956–1979	1980–2006	2004–2009, 2011–2015, 2024–present	118	76
(United States) Good Ranchers 250	Phoenix Raceway		1964–1978	1979–1995	1996–2005; 2016–2018, 2026	64	45
(United States) Indy 200 at Mid-Ohio	Mid-Ohio Sports Car Course			1980, 1983–2003	2007–present	42	41
(United States) Acura Grand Prix of Long Beach	Streets of Long Beach			1984–2008	2009–present	41	41
(Canada) Ontario Honda Dealers Indy at Markham	Streets of Markham & formerly Streets of Toronto			1986–2007	2009–2019, 2022–present	39	37
(United States) XPEL Grand Prix at Road America	Road America			1982–2004, 2006–2007	2016–present	36	35
(United States) BitNile.com Grand Prix of Portland	Portland International Raceway			1984–2007	2018–2019, 2021–present	31	31
(United States) Chevrolet Detroit Grand Prix	Streets of Detroit & formerly The Raceway at Belle Isle Park			1989–2001	2007–2008, 2012–2019, 2021–present	35	28
(United States) Grand Prix of Monterey	WeatherTech Raceway Laguna Seca			1983–2004	2019, 2021–present	28	28
(United States) Firestone Grand Prix of St. Petersburg	Streets of St. Petersburg			2003	2005–present	22	22
(United States) Bommarito Automotive Group 500	World Wide Technology Raceway at Gateway			1997–2000	2001–2003, 2017–present	17	16
(United States) Children's of Alabama Indy Grand Prix	Barber Motorsports Park				2010–2019, 2021–present	15	15
(United States) Sonsio Grand Prix	Indianapolis Motor Speedway Road Course				2014–present	11	11
(United States) Borchetta Bourbon Music City Grand Prix	Nashville Superspeedway				2001–2008, 2024–2026	10	10
(United States) Java House Grand Prix of Arlington	Streets of Arlington				2026	0	0
(United States) Freedom 250 Grand Prix of Washington, D.C.	Streets of Washington, D.C.				2026	0	0

== Former races and locations ==
Former races, includes all sanctioning bodies. Totals under 'Races' and 'Seasons' columns accurate as of the 2025 season.

Paved oval/Speedway
Dirt oval/Speedway
Road course/Street circuit

Event	Track	AAA	USAC	CART/CCWS	IndyCar	Races	Seasons
(United States) ABC Supply 500	Pocono Raceway		1971–1981	1982–1989	2013–2019	26	26
(United States) Atlanta 100	Lakewood Speedway	1946–1948	1956–1958			12	6
(United States) Atlanta 500 Classic	Atlanta Motor Speedway		1965–1966; 1978	1979; 1981–1983	1998–2001	14	11
(Netherlands) Bavaria Champ Car Grand Prix	TT Circuit Assen			2007		1	1
(Belgium) Belgian Champ Car Grand Prix	Circuit Zolder			2007		1	1
(United States) Bobby Ball Memorial	Arizona State Fairgrounds	1915; 1950–1955	1956–1963			15	15
(United States) Brainerd 200	Brainerd International Raceway		1969			2	1
(United States) Budweiser 500K	Riverside International Raceway		1967–1969	1981–1983		6	6
(United States) Caesars Palace Grand Prix	Caesars Palace, Las Vegas			1983–1984		2	2
(United States) California 200	Hanford Motor Speedway		1967–1969			4	3
(United States) California 500	Ontario Motor Speedway		1970–1978	1979–1980		11	11
(United States) CART Grand Prix of Chicago	Chicago Motor Speedway			1999–2002		4	4
(United Kingdom) Daily Express Indy Silverstone	Silverstone Circuit		1978			1	1
(United States) Dan Gurney 200	Pacific Raceways		1969			1	1
(United States) USAC Daytona 100	Daytona International Speedway		1959			1	1
(United States) Dayton 25	Dayton Speedway		1956*			1	1
(United States) Delphi Indy 200	Walt Disney World Speedway				1996–2000	5	5
(United States) Detroit 100	Michigan State Fairgrounds Speedway	1949–1953	1957			6	6
(Canada) Edmonton Indy	Edmonton City Centre Airport Speedway			2005–2007	2008–2012	8	8
(United States) Firestone Indy 225	Nazareth Speedway		1968–1969; 1982	1987–2001	2002–2004	21	21
(Japan) Fuji Race	Fuji Speedway		1966*			1	1
(United States) Gallagher Grand Prix	Indianapolis Motor Speedway Road Course	1916			2020–2023	5	5
(Germany) German 500	EuroSpeedway Lausitz			2001, 2003		2	2
(Australia) Gold Coast Indy 300	Streets of Surfers Paradise			1991–2007	2008*	18	18
(United States) Golden State 100	California State Fairgrounds Race Track	1949–1950; 1953–1955	1956–1970			20	20
(United States) GoPro Grand Prix of Sonoma	Sonoma Raceway		1970		2005–2018	15	15
(Mexico) Gran Premio Tecate	Autódromo Hermanos Rodríguez			1980–1981; 2002–2007		8	8
(United States) Grand Prix of Baltimore	Streets of Baltimore				2011–2013	3	3
(United States) Grand Prix of Cleveland	Cleveland Burke Lakefront Airport			1982–2007		26	26
(United States) Grand Prix of Denver	Civic Center & Pepsi Center			1990–1991; 2002–2006		7	7
(United States) Grand Prix of Houston	Downtown Houston & NRG Park			1998–2001; 2006–2007	2013–2014	10	8
(United States) Grand Prix of Miami	Tamiami Park; Museum Park; Bayfront Park			1985–1988; 1995; 2002–2003		7	7
(United States) Grand Prix at The Glen	Watkins Glen International			1979–1981	2005–2010; 2016–2017	11	11
(United States) Honda Indy 225	Pikes Peak International Raceway				1997–2005	9	9
(United States) Hoosier Grand Prix	Indianapolis Raceway Park		1965–1970			6	6
(United States) Hoosier Hundred	Indiana State Fairgrounds	1946; 1953–1955	1956–1970; 1981			20	20
(United States) Indianapolis Sweepstakes	Williams Grove Speedway	1949–1955	1956–1959*			11	11
(United States) Indy Grand Prix of Louisiana	NOLA Motorsports Park				2015	1	1
Indy Japan 300	Twin Ring Motegi			1998–2002	2003–2011	14	14
(United States) Indy Richmond 300	Richmond Raceway		1946		2001–2009	11	10
(United States) IndyCar Classic	Circuit of the Americas				2019	1	1
(Brazil) Itaipava São Paulo Indy 300	Streets of São Paulo				2010–2013	4	4
(United States) Kentucky Indy 300	Kentucky Speedway				2000–2011	12	12
(United States) Langhorne 100	Langhorne Speedway	1930,1935; 1940–1941; 1946–1951; 1954–1955	1956–1970			32	27
(United States) Las Vegas 300	Las Vegas Motor Speedway			2004–2005	1996–2000; **2011**	8	8
(United Kingdom) London Champ Car Trophy	Brands Hatch		1978	2003		2	2
(United States) Lubrilon Grand Prix	Texas World Speedway		1973; 1976–1979			9	5
(United States) Marlboro Challenge	All-star event (various circuits)			1987–1992		6	6
(United States) MAVTV 500	Auto Club Speedway			1997–2002	2002–2005; 2012–2015	14	13
(United States) MBNA Mid-Atlantic 200	Dover Downs International Speedway		1969		1998–1999	3	3
(United States) Meadowlands Grand Prix	Meadowlands Sports Complex			1984–1991		8	8
(United States) Miami Indy 300	Homestead-Miami Speedway			1996–2000	2001–2010	15	15
(United States) Michigan 400	Michigan International Speedway		1968; 1970–1978	1979–2001	2002–2007	54	39
(Canada) Molson Diamond Indy	Mosport Park		1967–1968; 1977–1978			4	4
(Canada) Molson Indy Montreal	Sanair Super Speedway & Circuit Gilles Villeneuve			1984–1986; 2002–2006		7	7
(Canada) Molson Indy Vancouver	Concord Pacific Place			1990–2004		15	15
(Canada) Mont-Tremblant Champ Car Grand Prix	Circuit Mont-Tremblant		1967–1968	2007		3	3
(United States) Music City Grand Prix	Streets of Nashville				2021–2023	3	3
(United States) New Hampshire Indy 225	New Hampshire Motor Speedway			1992–1995	1996–1998; 2011	8	8
(United States) Peak Antifreeze & Motor Oil Indy 300	Chicagoland Speedway				2001–2010	10	10
(United States) Pee Dee 200	Darlington Raceway		1956			1	1
(United States) PPG 375	Texas Motor Speedway				1997–2023	36	27
(Italy) Race of Two Worlds	Autodromo Nazionale Monza		1957–1958*			6	2
(Argentina) Rafaela Indy 300	Autódromo Ciudad de Rafaela		1971			1	1
(Brazil) Rio 200	Emerson Fittipaldi Speedway			1996–2000		5	5
(United States) RoadRunner Turbo Indy 300	Kansas Speedway				2001–2010	10	10
(United Kingdom) Rockingham 500	Rockingham Motor Speedway			2001–2002		2	2
(United States) Rocky Mountain 150	Continental Divide Raceways		1968–1970			3	3
(United States) San Jose Grand Prix	Streets of San Jose			2005–2007		3	3
(United States) Sedalia 100	Missouri State Fair Speedway		1970			1	1
(United States) Stardust 150	Stardust International Raceway		1968			1	1
(United States) Sukup IndyCar Race Weekend	Iowa Speedway				2007–2020, 2022–2025	23	18
(United States) Syracuse 100	Syracuse Mile	1920–1941; 1949–1955	1956–1962			36	36
(Mexico) Tecate/Telmex Grand Prix of Monterrey	Fundidora Park			2001–2006		6	6
(United States) Ted Horn Memorial	DuQuoin State Fairgrounds Racetrack	1948–1949	1956–1961; 1963–1970; 1981–1983			26	24
(United States) Thermal Club IndyCar Grand Prix	Thermal Club				2024–2025	2	2
(United States) Tony Bettenhausen 100	Illinois State Fairgrounds Racetrack	1934–1940; 1947–1955	1956–1970; 1981–1982			37	33
(United States) Trenton 150	Trenton Speedway	1946,1949	1957–1978	1979		53	25
(United States) Vegas Grand Prix	Streets of Las Vegas			2007		1	1
(United States) VisionAire 500K	Charlotte Motor Speedway				1997–1998, **1999**	3	3

Bold: Race abandoned.

*Non-championship race

== Cancelled races and locations ==
These races were cancelled for various reasons and includes all sanctioning bodies, accurate as of the 2025 season.

Year	Event	Track	Body	Cancellation Reason
1916*	(United States) 100-mile race	Recreation Park	AAA	Cancelled after first-round eleven-car pileup, which left two racers dead and eight injured. Authorities had track investigation.
1917 & 1918	(United States) Indianapolis 500	Indianapolis Motor Speedway	AAA	Cancelled due to the United States entering World War I
1942	(United States) Indianapolis 500	Indianapolis Motor Speedway	AAA	Cancelled as the United States entered World War II. Future races would remain halted for the next three years. The Indy 500 returned in 1946.
1980	(United States) (Canada) USAC Championship Car season	Texas World Speedway, Road Atlanta, Milwaukee Mile (second race), Talladega Superspeedway, Canadian Tire Motorsport Park, Charlotte Motor Speedway	USAC	Six events cancelled as USAC started to unite with CART
1981	(United States) Chicago Indy Grand Prix	Streets of Chicago	CART	Announced in 1980 for a race the following year, however it never came to fruition. CART eventually raced in Cicero.
1999	(United States) VisionAire 500K	Charlotte Motor Speedway	IRL	Abandoned after 79 laps due to spectator fatalities, not an official race (105 of 208 laps required).
1999	(United States) Hawaiian Super Prix	Kalaeloa Airport	CART	Cancelled by promoter at the last minute
2001	(United States) Firestone Firehawk 600	Texas Motor Speedway	CART	Cancelled after qualifying due to driver safety concerns
2003	(United States) King Taco 500	Auto Club Speedway	CART	Cancelled due to the Old Fire natural disaster
2004	(South Korea) Grand Prix of Seoul	Streets of Seoul	CCWS	Cancelled due to track construction behind schedule
2005 & 2006	(South Korea) Grand Prix of Ansan	Streets of Ansan	CCWS	Cancelled due to numerous delays
2007	Champ Car China Grand Prix	Zhuhai International Circuit	CCWS	Announced but were never fulfilled mostly due to financial reasons
2007	(United States) Grand Prix Arizona	Streets of Phoenix	CCWS	Announced but were never fulfilled mostly due to financial reasons
2007	(United States) Grand Prix of Denver	Streets of Denver	CCWS	Announced but were never fulfilled mostly due to financial reasons
2008	(United States) Champ Car season	All races except for three	CCWS	Champ Car / Indy Racing League (IRL) reunification – Champ Car held its final race at the Grand Prix of Long Beach and the IRL added Edmonton Indy and Surfer's Paradise to its 2008 schedule.
2011	(United States) IZOD IndyCar World Championship	Las Vegas Motor Speedway	IndyCar	Abandoned after 11 laps due to the death of Dan Wheldon. Series rules required 101 of 200 laps to be completed for race to become official.
2012	(China) Indy Qingdao 600	Streets of Qingdao	IndyCar	Cancelled by promoters due to logistical reasons. Replaced on schedule in 2013 by Pocono Raceway.
2015	(Brazil) Brasilia Indy 300	Autódromo Internacional Nelson Piquet (Brasília)	IndyCar	Cancelled by representatives of newly elected Brazilian Socialist Party
2016	(United States) Grand Prix of Boston	Boston Seaport District	IndyCar	Replaced by Watkins Glen International following issues with promoter.
2020	(United States) Honda Indy Grand Prix of Alabama	Barber Motorsports Park	IndyCar	Cancelled due to health concerns caused from the COVID-19 pandemic.
2020	(United States) Grand Prix of Long Beach	Streets of Long Beach	IndyCar	Cancelled due to health concerns caused from the COVID-19 pandemic.
2020	(United States) AutoNation IndyCar Challenge	Circuit of the Americas	IndyCar	Cancelled due to health concerns caused from the COVID-19 pandemic.
2020	(United States) Detroit Grand Prix	The Raceway at Belle Isle Park	IndyCar	Cancelled due to health concerns caused from the COVID-19 pandemic.
2020	(United States) Indy Richmond 300	Richmond Raceway	IndyCar	Cancelled due to health concerns caused from the COVID-19 pandemic.
2020	(Canada) Honda Indy Toronto	Exhibition Place	IndyCar	Cancelled due to health concerns caused from the COVID-19 pandemic.
2020	(United States) Grand Prix of Portland	Portland International Raceway	IndyCar	Cancelled due to health concerns caused from the COVID-19 pandemic.
2020	(United States) IndyCar Monterey Grand Prix	WeatherTech Raceway Laguna Seca	IndyCar	Cancelled due to health concerns caused from the COVID-19 pandemic.

*Non-championship race

== Selected records ==
=== All-time fastest races ===
==== 500 mile races ====
- Races averaging 180 mph or greater

Date	Race	Track	Sanction	Winner	Distance (miles)	Time	Speed (mph)
July 6, 2014	Pocono IndyCar 500	Pocono	IndyCar	(Colombia) Juan Pablo Montoya	500	2:28:13.1798	202.402
November 3, 2002	The 500	Fontana	CART	(United States) Jimmy Vasser	507.25	2:33:42.960	197.995
August 30, 2014	MAVTV 500	Fontana	IndyCar	(Brazil) Tony Kanaan	500	2:32:58.4659	196.111
May 30, 2021	Indianapolis 500	Indianapolis	IndyCar	(Brazil) Helio Castroneves	500	2:37:19.3846	190.690
August 5, 1990	Marlboro 500	Michigan	CART	(United States) Al Unser Jr.	500	2:38:07.219	189.727
August 1, 1993	Marlboro 500	Michigan	CART	(United Kingdom) Nigel Mansell	500	2:39:24.131	188.203
May 26, 2013	Indianapolis 500	Indianapolis	IndyCar	(Brazil) Tony Kanaan	500	2:40:03.4181	187.433
May 25, 2014	Indianapolis 500	Indianapolis	IndyCar	(United States) Ryan Hunter-Reay	500	2:40:48.2305	186.563
July 25, 1999	U.S. 500	Michigan	CART	(Brazil) Tony Kanaan	500	2:41:12.362	186.097
May 27, 1990	Indianapolis 500	Indianapolis	USAC	(Netherlands) Arie Luyendyk	500	2:41:18.414	185.981
August 7, 1988	Marlboro 500	Michigan	CART	(United States) Danny Sullivan	500	2:46:03.820	180.654
August 22, 2016	ABC Supply 500	Pocono	IndyCar	(Australia) Will Power	500	2:46:29	180.198

==== All types and all tracks ====
- Races averaging 190 mph or greater

Date	Race	Track	Sanction	Winner	Distance (miles)	Time	Speed (mph)
September 21, 2003	Toyota Indy 400	Fontana	IRL	(United States) Sam Hornish Jr.	400	1:55:51.451	207.151
June 11, 2011	Firestone Twin 275s #2	Texas	IndyCar	(Australia) Will Power	165.87	0:48:08.9739	206.693
July 6, 2014	Pocono IndyCar 500	Pocono	IndyCar	(Colombia) Juan Pablo Montoya	500	2:28:13.1798	202.402
October 10, 2009	Firestone Indy 300	Homestead	IRL	(United Kingdom) Dario Franchitti	297	1:28:28.3117	201.420
August 1, 2009	Meijer Indy 300	Kentucky	IRL	(Australia) Ryan Briscoe	296	1:28:24.3246	200.893
November 3, 2002	The 500	Fontana	CART	(United States) Jimmy Vasser	507.25	2:33:42.977	197.995
August 17, 2003	Belterra Casino Indy 300	Kentucky	IRL	(United States) Sam Hornish Jr.	296	1:29:44.6120	197.897
August 30, 2014	MAVTV 500	Fontana	IndyCar	(Brazil) Tony Kanaan	500	2:32:58.4659	196.111
September 10, 2006	Peak Antifreeze Indy 300	Chicagoland	IRL	(United Kingdom) Dan Wheldon	304	1:33:37.2662	194.828
July 30, 2006	Firestone Indy 400	Michigan	IRL	(Brazil) Hélio Castroneves	400	2:03:43.7441	193.972
July 7, 2013	Pocono IndyCar 400	Pocono	IndyCar	(New Zealand) Scott Dixon	400	2:04:26.4178	192.864
May 30, 2021	Indianapolis 500	Indianapolis	IndyCar	(Brazil) Hélio Castroneves	500	2:37:19.3846	190.690

NOTE: Some discrepancy in track calculations used by IndyCar and CART.

=== Closest finishes ===
==== All races ====
Date	Winner	Margin (seconds)	Runner-up	Sanction	Race	Track
September 8, 2002	(United States) Sam Hornish Jr.	0.0024	(United States) Al Unser Jr.	IRL	Delphi Indy 300	Chicagoland
September 7, 2008	(Brazil) Hélio Castroneves	0.0033	(New Zealand) Scott Dixon	IRL	Peak Antifreeze Indy 300	Chicagoland
July 4, 2004	(United States) Buddy Rice	0.0051	(Brazil) Vítor Meira	IRL	Argent Mortgage Indy 300	Kansas
August 29, 2009	(Australia) Ryan Briscoe	0.0077	(New Zealand) Scott Dixon	IRL	Peak Antifreeze Indy 300	Chicagoland
August 27, 2016	(United States) Graham Rahal	0.0080	(Canada) James Hinchcliffe	IndyCar	Firestone 600	Texas
September 15, 2002	(United States) Sam Hornish Jr.	0.0096	(Brazil) Hélio Castroneves	IRL	Chevy 500	Texas
October 2, 2011	(United States) Ed Carpenter	0.0098	(United Kingdom) Dario Franchitti	IndyCar	Kentucky Indy 300	Kentucky
September 7, 2003	(United States) Sam Hornish Jr.	0.0099	(New Zealand) Scott Dixon	IRL	Delphi Indy 300	Chicagoland

==== 500 mile races ====
Date	Winner	Margin (seconds)	Runner-up	Sanction	Race	Track
May 24, 2026	(Sweden) Felix Rosenqvist	0.023	(United States) David Malukas	IndyCar	Indianapolis 500	Indianapolis
July 25, 1999	(Brazil) Tony Kanaan	0.032	(Colombia) Juan Pablo Montoya	CART	U.S. 500 by Toyota	Michigan
July 23, 2000	(Colombia) Juan Pablo Montoya	0.040	(United States) Michael Andretti	CART	U.S. 500 by Toyota	Michigan
May 24, 1992	(United States) Al Unser Jr.	0.043	(Canada) Scott Goodyear	USAC	Indianapolis 500	Indianapolis
July 30, 1995	(United States) Scott Pruett	0.056	(United States) Al Unser Jr.	CART	Marlboro 500	Michigan
May 26, 2014	(United States) Ryan Hunter-Reay	0.0600	(Brazil) Hélio Castroneves	IndyCar	Indianapolis 500	Indianapolis
May 28, 2006	(United States) Sam Hornish Jr.	0.0635	(United States) Marco Andretti	IRL	Indianapolis 500	Indianapolis

==== Road courses ====
Date	Winner	Margin (seconds)	Runner-up	Sanction	Race	Track
June 27, 1997	(United Kingdom) Mark Blundell	0.027	(Brazil) Gil de Ferran	CART	Budweiser/G.I. Joe's 200	Portland
June 15, 1986	(United States) Mario Andretti	0.070	(United States) Michael Andretti	CART	Budweiser/G.I. Joe's 200	Portland
