= 2008 Champ Car World Series =

Cancelled 2008 American motorsport season

2008 Champ Car season
- Champ Car World Series

Season
- Races: ~~14~~
- Start date: ~~April 20~~
- End date: ~~November 9~~

Awards

The 2008 Champ Car World Series was the cancelled 30th season of the Champ Car World Series, a motor racing series for top-level American open-wheel cars, and the fifth season under the sanctioning of Champ Car. It would have represented the 97th official national championship season with the rivaling 2008 IndyCar Series. The championship was to have featured 14 rounds, beginning on April 20 and ending on November 9.

Entering the 13th year of the schism between the two American open-wheel car racing sanctioning bodies, Champ Car and the Indy Racing League (IRL), public interest in the sport had fallen well short of fellow American motorsport NASCAR and none of the attempts to unify the leagues materialized. As Champ Car faced impending bankruptcy, however, negotiations followed through, and the leagues finally merged on February 22, 2008, under the IndyCar Series banner. As per the leagues' agreement, Champ Car was dissolved as an entity after their final race, the 2008 Toyota Grand Prix of Long Beach, which was held on the same day as the IRL's Indy Japan 300. All participants of the Long Beach race who intended to join the IndyCar Series were awarded points towards their 2008 championship. The race was won by Will Power.

== Teams and drivers ==
The following teams and drivers were expected to compete in the 2008 Champ Car World Series prior to the Champ Car–Indy Racing League (IRL) merger. All teams would have used 2.65 L (0.70 U.S. gal) turbocharged V8 engines supplied by Cosworth, the Panoz DP01 chassis, and tires supplied by Bridgestone.

Team	No.	Driver
(United States) Newman/Haas/Lanigan Racing	1	(United Kingdom) Justin Wilson
(United States) Newman/Haas/Lanigan Racing	2	(United States) Graham Rahal
(United States) Forsythe/Pettit Racing	3	(Canada) Paul Tracy
(United States) Rocketsports Racing	8	(Brazil) Enrique Bernoldi
(United States) PKV Racing	22	(Spain) Oriol Servià
(United States) Conquest Racing	24	(France) Franck Perera
(United States) Pacific Coast Motorsports	28	(Mexico) David Martínez
(United States) Pacific Coast Motorsports	29	(United States) Alex Figge

=== Test drivers ===
The following drivers did not have a guaranteed ride for the 2008 Champ Car World Series, but competed in the final Champ Car open test at Sebring International Raceway prior to the merger.

Team	No.	Driver
(United Kingdom) Minardi Team USA	4	(Colombia) E. J. Viso
(United States) Forsythe/Pettit Racing	7	(France) Franck Montagny
(United States) Dale Coyne Racing	11	(Brazil) Bruno Junqueira
(United States) Dale Coyne Racing	19	(Brazil) Mario Moraes
(United States) PKV Racing	21	(Canada) Alex Tagliani
(United States) Conquest Racing	34	(France) Simon Pagenaud

=== Team changes ===
Days before the 2007 Lexmark Indy 300, Justin Wilson revealed to Gold Coast Publications that his team RuSPORT was shutting down at the end of the 2007 season, leaving him without a ride. The team was previously merged with Rocketsports Racing as RSPORTS at the start of the season, but the two teams separated in August 2007. Bruce Delahorne, the senior manager of national advertising and racing of the team's sponsor CDW, explained that the company was pulling their sponsorship because he had lost confidence in the team after Dan Pettit acquired it from founder Paul Russo. In November 2007, Pettit announced that RuSPORT would merge with Forsythe Championship Racing, which became Forsythe/Pettit Racing for the 2008 season.

Team Australia co-owner Derrick Walker initially expressed a desire to field cars in the Champ Car World Series and the IndyCar Series as he did in 2000 and 2001, having already owned four Panoz chassis for the former series and three Dallara chassis for the latter. However, due to his frustration over Champ Car officials' lack of communication with their teams and his presumption that their series was soon shutting down, Walker decided against participating in pre-season testing at Sebring International Raceway and planned on joining the IndyCar Series.

In June 2007, adult entertainment company AVN Media Network partnered with marketing firm Sports & Entertainment International to form AVN Racing, a team that was planned to field at least one full-time entry for the 2008 season. The team's chief executive officer (CEO) and president Russ Herriott hoped to "run a race or two [in 2007] as a test for us and for Champ Car to see if it makes sense to do a full season in 2008." The team did not issue any further statements about their involvement in the series, however, signaling that it was shut down before the 2008 season was scheduled to begin.

=== Driver changes ===
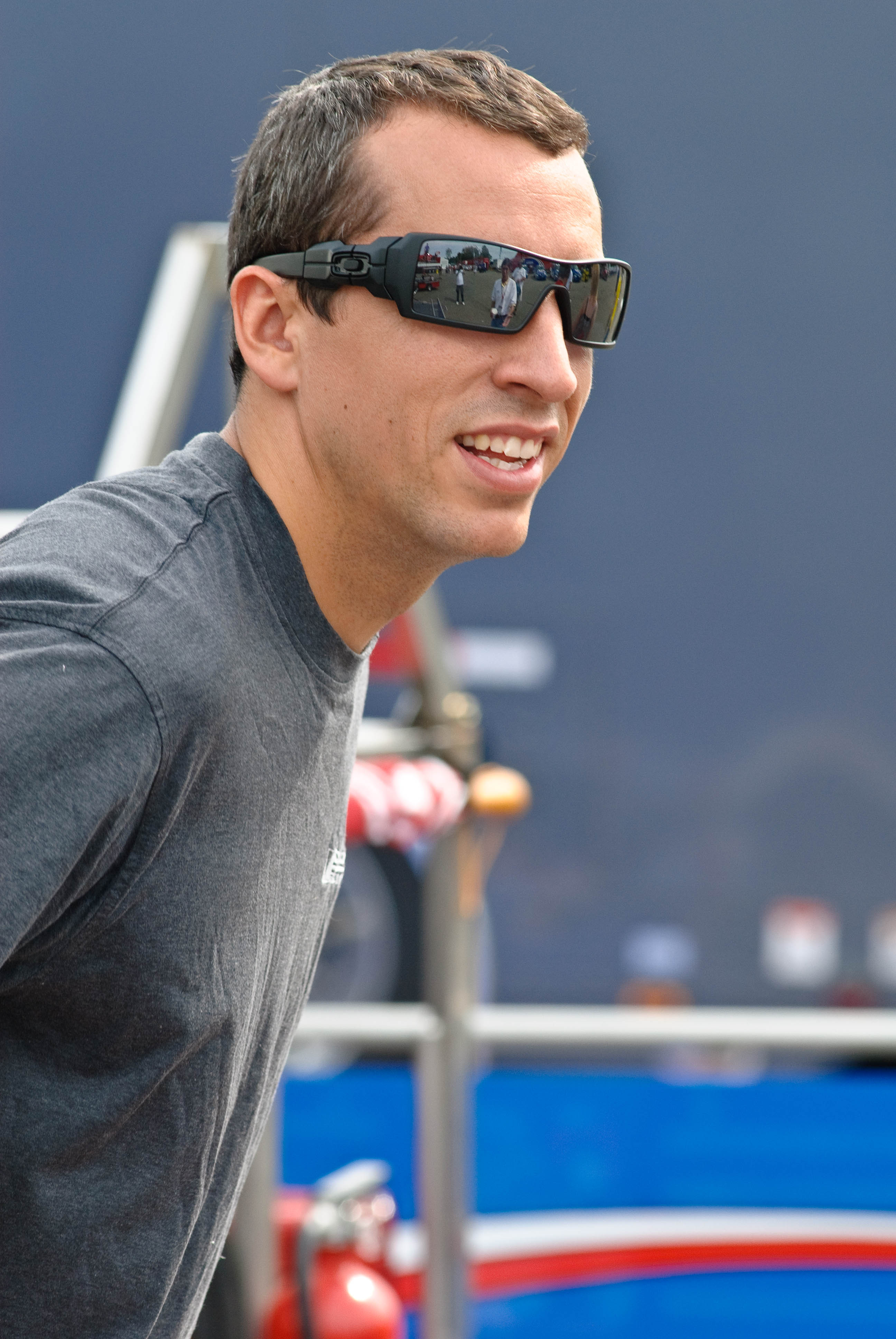
Justin Wilson (pictured in 2009) replaced Sébastien Bourdais at Newman/Haas/Lanigan Racing. He was considered the title favorite before Champ Car went bankrupt.

The series' most notable absentee was four-time and defending champion Sébastien Bourdais, who moved to Formula One for the 2008 season, joining Scuderia Toro Rosso as a replacement for Vitantonio Liuzzi. Wilson took Bourdais' seat at Newman/Haas/Lanigan Racing and was teamed with second-generation driver Graham Rahal, while Wilson's former RSPORTS teammate Alex Tagliani was replaced by former Formula One driver Enrique Bernoldi at Rocketsports Racing. 2007 Rookie of the Year Robert Doornbos valiantly fought to replace Bourdais and was confused as to why Wilson was chosen over him. He was also in a contractual disagreement with his current team Minardi Team USA, demanding that they give him a larger budget for the upcoming season in order to avoid him leaving for other teams that took an interest in hiring him, such as PKV Racing and Forsythe/Pettit Racing.

Oriol Servià drove for PKV Racing in the final two rounds of the 2007 season after being let go by Forsythe/Pettit Racing (then Forsythe Championship Racing) in favor of rookie driver David Martínez, and later signed on to rejoin the team for the first time since the 2006 season. The team planned to field a second entry with an unknown driver. Servià's past teammate and 2003 Drivers' Champion Paul Tracy was speculated to soon become an IRL driver after a report from veteran journalist Robin Miller claimed that his team owner Gerald Forsythe gave him an ultimatum to accept a large pay cut for his five-year contract with the team or lose his ride altogether. However, in January 2008, Tracy confirmed that he would remain with the team following a meeting with Forsythe after the holiday season.

Champ Car Atlantic driver Franck Perera was announced as Conquest Racing's first of two drivers for the 2008 season; the other driver was never announced prior to the merger. Perera finished second in the 2007 Atlantic Championship, but despite champion Raphael Matos' switch to the IRL Indy Pro Series for their 2008 season, Perera did not receive the $2 million advancement prize.

Pacific Coast Motorsports retained Alex Figge for the 2008 season, partnering him with Martínez in his first full season of the Champ Car World Series.

== Planned schedule ==
The 2008 Champ Car World Series schedule was announced on November 5, 2007. For the second consecutive year, no oval tracks were included.

Round	Date	Race	Track	Location
1	April 20	Toyota Grand Prix of Long Beach	S Streets of Long Beach	(United States) Long Beach, California
2	April 27	Grand Prix of Houston	S JAGFlo Speedway at Reliant Park	(United States) Houston, Texas
3	May 18	Champ Car Grand Prix at Mazda Raceway Laguna Seca	R Mazda Raceway Laguna Seca	(United States) Monterey, California
4	June 1	Champ Car Grand Prix of Belgium at Circuit Zolder	R Circuit Zolder	(Belgium) Heusden-Zolder, Limburg
5	June 8	Gran Premio Champ Car de España	R Circuito de Jerez	(Spain) Jerez de la Frontera, Cádiz
6	June 22	Champ Car Grand Prix of Cleveland	S Cleveland Burke Lakefront Airport	(United States) Cleveland, Ohio
7	June 29	Champ Car Mont-Tremblant	R Circuit Mont-Tremblant	(Canada) Mont-Tremblant, Quebec
8	July 6	Steelback Grand Prix of Toronto	S Exhibition Place	(Canada) Toronto, Ontario
9	July 20	Rexall Grand Prix of Edmonton	R Edmonton City Centre Airport	(Canada) Edmonton, Alberta
10	July 27	Champ Car Grand Prix of Portland	R Portland International Raceway	(United States) Portland, Oregon
11	August 10	Road America Grand Prix	R Road America	(United States) Elkhart Lake, Wisconsin
12	September 14	Champ Car Grand Prix of Holland at TT Circuit Assen	R TT Circuit Assen	(Netherlands) Assen, Drenthe
13	October 26	Gold Coast Indy 300	S Surfers Paradise Street Circuit	(Australia) Surfers Paradise, Queensland
14	November 9	Gran Premio Tecate	R Autódromo Hermanos Rodríguez	Mexico City

Key
Symbol	Track type
R	Road course
S	Street circuit

=== Schedule changes ===
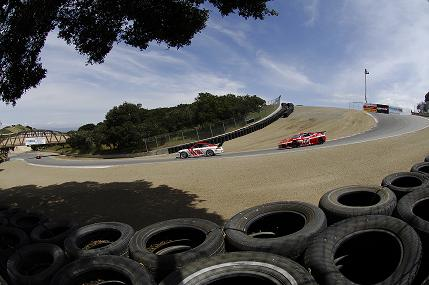
Mazda Raceway Laguna Seca (pictured in 2005) was due to return to the Champ Car World Series after a three-year absence.

The lone new addition to the Champ Car World Series calendar in 2008 was the Gran Premio Champ Car de España. Circuito de Jerez, the track on which the Grand Prix was to be held, last hosted a Formula One race in 1997, but had since undergone a resurfacing in 2005. It would have been the first Champ Car World Series race to be staged in Spain. Another track returned to the series' schedule; after being excluded in 2005 in favor of the San Jose Grand Prix, the Mazda Raceway Laguna Seca's Grand Prix returned to the Champ Car World Series in 2008 because several new construction projects in San Jose left race organizers with little room to reconfigure the San Jose Street Circuit.

Despite the popularity of the inaugural Vegas Grand Prix in 2007, the event did not return to the schedule in 2008 because its promoters failed to secure sponsorship, which resulted in a financial loss. They also cancelled the 2007 Grand Prix Arizona for the same reason. However, the event's local organizer Jim Freudenberg still hoped to bring back the event in 2009, possibly moving it from downtown Las Vegas to the Thomas & Mack Center near the Las Vegas Strip. The Grand Prix of Long Beach thus returned as the season opener and was set to celebrate its silver anniversary as a Champ Car World Series event. The China Grand Prix at Zhuhai International Circuit, which was cancelled in 2007 due to a change of race promoter, was also left off the 2008 schedule because Champ Car felt that not enough progress was made for them to continue pursuing the event.

== Champ Car–IRL merger ==
In January 2008, rumors of a potential unification between Champ Car and the IRL were reignited, as Speed Channel revealed that IRL CEO Tony George planned to offer free cars and engines to the Champ Car teams and add five Champ Car World Series events to the IndyCar Series' 2008 schedule in order to unify American open-wheel car racing. However, George claimed that the window of opportunity for 2008 had passed, while Champ Car team owners said that a formal offer was never made. Shortly after, eight of the nine Champ Car World Series teams entered fourteen drivers for the first open test of the season at Sebring International Raceway on February 2–4; Team Australia was the only team that didn't participate. Some of the teams were using the test to evaluate possible candidates for their cars in the upcoming season. Franck Montagny impressed in his outing with Forsythe/Pettit Racing by topping the speed charts in the first two days of testing, while countryman Franck Perera led the final day.

Unification of the sport was set in motion again on February 7, as Robin Miller reported that a deal had finally been reached between the two series on similar terms to George's previous offer. Shortly after, George traveled to Japan to resolve a scheduling conflict between the IRL-sanctioned Indy Japan 300 and the Champ Car-sanctioned Toyota Grand Prix of Long Beach, the latter of which couldn't be rescheduled because of the contract with Long Beach Convention Center. The officials of Twin Ring Motegi – the track that the Indy Japan 300 was held at – offered to move their race back a week, but Kansas Speedway already had an IndyCar Series race scheduled on that weekend. Meanwhile, ESPN.com writer John Oreovicz revealed that Champ Car was considering an emergency liquidation in order to allow the IRL to assume full control of American open-wheel car racing; Champ Car co-owner Kevin Kalkhoven denied the report at first, but later admitted that he and co-owner Gerald Forsythe were discussing a merger with the IRL and indicated that media leaks had "significantly hampered discussions."

"What we have done is in the best interest of the fans of North American open-wheel motorsport. It has been a long and interesting journey but I honestly believe that it's just the start of a lot of hard work on the schedule, on the car for [2012], and on promoting the personalities. We're redeveloping North American motorsport, and I'm committed to it. Please recognize that this is just the start."

— Champ Car co-owner Kevin Kalkhoven commenting on his decision to unify Indy car racing.

The Champ Car–IRL merger was finally announced by both organizations at Indianapolis on February 22, 2008, with details of the merger being revealed in a press conference at Homestead–Miami Speedway five days later. As per their deal, Champ Car's Long Beach race and the IRL's Motegi race would be held on the same day; the former event would be promoted as the send-off of the Champ Car World Series, after which Champ Car would be dissolved, and any drivers who intended on joining the IndyCar Series would receive championship points towards the series' 2008 season. The Grand Prix of Long Beach was held under Champ Car specifications, meaning that all participants of the event would use the Panoz chassis and Cosworth engines for the last time. The Edmonton and Surfers Paradise races were integrated into the 2008 IndyCar Series schedule, the latter of which was a non-championship event, while the remaining Champ Car World Series events were cancelled, though the IRL did not rule out bringing some of the races back for their 2009 IndyCar Series season. In addition, the IRL purchased various "non-tangible and tangible assets of Champ Car," including their intellectual property, historical records of American open-wheel car racing dating back to 1909, and their medical transporter. The remants of Champ Car were filed for Chapter 11 Bankruptcy in March.

All nine Champ Car teams were eligible to receive the IRL's support package, which included two Dallara chassis (one new and one used), one Honda engine lease program, and $1.2 million per team. Six of the nine teams elected to enter the IndyCar Series in 2008; Forsythe/Pettit Racing and Rocketsports Racing both disbanded because of a lack of sponsorship, while an acrimonious split between Team Australia co-owners Derrick Walker and Craig Gore led to Walker Racing shutting down and Will Power being hired by KV Racing Technology. Twenty drivers competed in the Champ Car World Series finale at Long Beach, including veterans such as Paul Tracy, Roberto Moreno, Mario Domínguez, Alex Tagliani, and Jimmy Vasser. Nine of the drivers were competing for the IndyCar Series championship. Power led 81 of 83 laps and won the race.

=== Legacy ===
For the 2009 season, the annual Surfers Paradise race was moved to the A1 Grand Prix series, while the Long Beach and Toronto events were added onto the IndyCar Series schedule. Since then, four events from the Champ Car World Series' aborted 2008 season – Houston in 2013, Road America in 2016, Portland in 2018, and Laguna Seca in 2019 – were retained by the IndyCar Series, but the Edmonton, Houston, and Toronto races were discontinued after 2012, 2014 and 2025, respectively. Of the final nine Champ Car World Series teams, Dale Coyne Racing is the only team that still operates in the IndyCar Series as of 2026.
