= Gran Premio Tecate =

Coordinates: 19°24′22″N 99°5′33″W

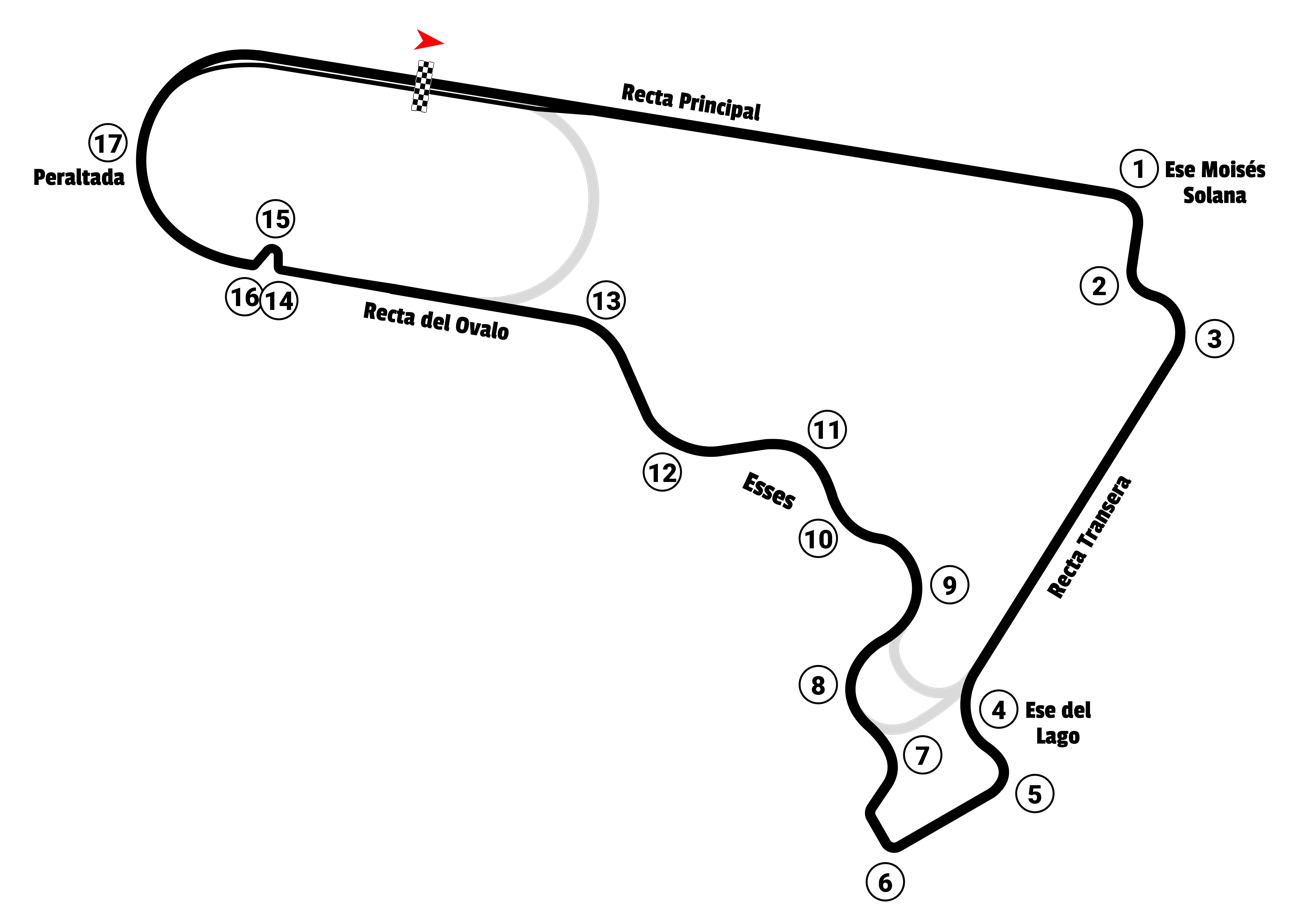

Champ Car World Series
- Venue: Autódromo Hermanos Rodríguez
- First race: 1980
- Last race: 2007
- Duration: 1 hour, 45 minutes
- Previous names: Copa México 150
- Most wins (driver): Sébastien Bourdais (3)
- Most wins (team): Newman/Haas Racing (3)
- Most wins (manufacturer): Lola (5)

The Gran Premio Tecate was a round of the Champ Car World Series held on the Autodromo Hermanos Rodriguez circuit in Mexico City, Mexico. It was first held in 1980, and in its first two years of competition was the penultimate round of the championship. After its re-inception in 2002, it was the season-ending round. It was to have been the penultimate round of the 2007 season, but became the final round when the Grand Prix Arizona was cancelled.

== 2007 race ==
During the 2007 race, three drivers failed to get going off the grid. Also, Robert Doornbos — placed 3rd in the Champ Car point standings entering the race — had car problems early and was out of the race by lap 10, although he returned later to trying and accomplish the fastest lap of the race and secure an extra bonus point toward the championship.

The top three results of the race were Sébastien Bourdais, Will Power and Oriol Servià. It concluded the final Champ Car season, as the series was absorbed by the IndyCar Series in February 2008.

== Past winners ==
| Season | Date | Driver | Team | Chassis | Engine | Race Distance | | Race Time | Average Speed (mph) | Report | Ref |
| Season | Date | Driver | Team | Chassis | Engine | Laps | Miles (km) | Race Time | Average Speed (mph) | Report | Ref |
|---|---|---|---|---|---|---|---|---|---|---|---|
| 1980 | October 26 | (United States) Rick Mears | Penske Racing | Penske | Cosworth | 60 | 148.8 (239.47) | 1:16:43 | 116.376 | Report | |
| 1981 | October 18 | (United States) Rick Mears | Penske Racing | Penske | Cosworth | 59 | 147.5 (237.378) | 1:24:48 | 104.363 | Report | |
| 1982 – 2001 | Not held | | | | | | | | | | |
| 2002 | November 17 | (Sweden) Kenny Bräck | Chip Ganassi Racing | Lola | Toyota | 73 | 203.378 (327.305) | 1:56:48 | 104.468 | Report | |
| 2003 | October 12 | (Canada) Paul Tracy | Forsythe Racing | Lola | Ford-Cosworth | 70 | 195.02 (313.854) | 1:56:51 | 100.133 | Report | |
| 2004 | November 7 | (France) Sébastien Bourdais | Newman/Haas Racing | Lola | Ford-Cosworth | 63 | 175.518 (282.468) | 1:39:02 | 106.327 | Report | |
| 2005 | November 6 | (United Kingdom) Justin Wilson | RuSPORT | Lola | Ford-Cosworth | 70 | 195.02 (313.854) | 1:58:23 | 98.835 | Report | |
| 2006 | November 12 | (France) Sébastien Bourdais | Newman/Haas Racing | Lola | Ford-Cosworth | 66 | 183.084 (294.645) | 1:51:31 | 98.504 | Report | |
| 2007 | November 11 | (France) Sébastien Bourdais | Newman/Haas/Lanigan Racing | Panoz | Cosworth | 64 | 177.536 (285.716) | 1:45:02 | 101.403 | Report | |
