= 2007 Gran Premio Tecate =

2007 Mexico City
Race details
- Race 14 of 14 in the 2007 Champ Car season
- Autódromo Hermanos Rodríguez Track Layout
- Date: November 11, 2007
- Official name: Gran Premio Tecate Presented by Banamex
- Location: Autódromo Hermanos Rodríguez; Mexico City, Mexico
- Course: Permanent Road Course; 2.774 mi / 4.470 km
- Distance: 64 laps 177.536 mi / 286.080 km
- Weather: Sunny

Pole position
- Driver: Will Power (Team Australia)
- Time: 1:23.558

Fastest lap
- Driver: (Netherlands) (Netherlands) Robert Doornbos (Minardi Team USA)
- Time: 1:24.713 (on lap 8 of 64)

Podium
- First: (France) (France) Sébastien Bourdais (N/H/L Racing)
- Second: Will Power (Team Australia)
- Third: (Spain) (Spain) Oriol Servià (PKV Racing)

The 2007 Gran Premio Tecate was the fourteenth and final race of the 2007 Champ Car World Series season. It was held on November 11, 2007 at the Autódromo Hermanos Rodríguez in Mexico City, Mexico. The race was won by Sébastien Bourdais in his last Champ Car race before joining the Scuderia Toro Rosso team in Formula One. With the merger of the Indy Racing League and Champ Car World Series in 2008 it would turn out to be the final event run under the Champ Car banner, and penultimate under the v8 turbo formula.

== Qualifying results ==
| Pos | Nat | Name | Team | Qual 1 | Qual 2 | Best |
|---|---|---|---|---|---|---|
| 1 | (Australia) | Will Power | Team Australia | 1:25.199 | 1:23.558 | 1:23.558 |
| 2 | (France) | Sébastien Bourdais | N/H/L Racing | 1:24.698 | 1:24.901 | 1:24.698 |
| 3 | (Netherlands) | Robert Doornbos | Minardi Team USA | 1:26.220 | 1:24.152 | 1:24.152 |
| 4 | (Spain) | Oriol Servià | PKV Racing | 1:25.436 | 1:24.324 | 1:24.324 |
| 5 | (United Kingdom) | Justin Wilson | RuSPORT | 1:24.825 | 1:24.365 | 1:24.365 |
| 6 | (France) | Simon Pagenaud | Team Australia | 1:25.952 | 1:24.394 | 1:24.394 |
| 7 | (United States) | Graham Rahal | N/H/L Racing | 1:25.889 | 1:24.515 | 1:24.515 |
| 8 | (Canada) | Paul Tracy | Forsythe Racing | 1:26.130 | 1:24.608 | 1:24.608 |
| 9 | (United Kingdom) | Dan Clarke | Minardi Team USA | 1:26.617 | 1:24.764 | 1:24.764 |
| 10 | (Mexico) | David Martínez | Forsythe Racing | 1:26.056 | 1:24.888 | 1:24.888 |
| 11 | (Switzerland) | Neel Jani | PKV Racing | 1:26.156 | 1:24.929 | 1:24.929 |
| 12 | (Brazil) | Bruno Junqueira | Dale Coyne Racing | 1:26.190 | 1:25.361 | 1:25.361 |
| 13 | (France) | Nelson Philippe | Conquest Racing | 1:26.952 | 1:25.405 | 1:25.405 |
| 14 | (Canada) | Alex Tagliani | Rocketsports Racing | 1:27.277 | 1:25.446 | 1:25.446 |
| 15 | (Mexico) | Mario Domínguez | Pacific Coast Motorsports | 1:26.181 | 1:25.602 | 1:25.602 |
| 16 | (United Kingdom) | Katherine Legge | Dale Coyne Racing | 1:28.069 | 1:26.277 | 1:26.277 |
| 17 | (United States) | Alex Figge | Pacific Coast Motorsports | 1:27.230 | 1:26.582 | 1:26.582 |

24 hours after Sébastien Bourdais established a new track record in Friday qualifying at the Autódromo Hermanos Rodríguez, seven drivers were able to improve on that mark during Saturday's session. But Will Power was far and away the fastest of the fast on the day, finishing .594 seconds ahead of his closest competitor, Robert Doornbos, thus clinching his fifth pole position of the year and second in succession. Power was driving with a broken wrist suffered in his home race three weeks ago in Australia. Bourdais was unable to better his Friday time, but started the race next to Will Power on the front row of the grid.

== Race ==
| Pos | No | Driver | Team | Laps | Time/Retired | Grid | Points |
|---|---|---|---|---|---|---|---|
| 1 | 1 | (France) Sébastien Bourdais | N/H/L Racing | 64 | 1:45:02.885 | 2 | 32 |
| 2 | 5 | (Australia) Will Power | Team Australia | 64 | +1.906 | 1 | 29 |
| 3 | 22 | (Spain) Oriol Servià | PKV Racing | 64 | +3.364 | 4 | 25 |
| 4 | 2 | (United States) Graham Rahal | N/H/L Racing | 64 | +7.346 | 7 | 23 |
| 5 | 3 | (Canada) Paul Tracy | Forsythe Racing | 64 | +8.593 | 8 | 21 |
| 6 | 15 | (France) Simon Pagenaud | Team Australia | 64 | +9.638 | 6 | 19 |
| 7 | 19 | (Brazil) Bruno Junqueira | Dale Coyne Racing | 64 | +15.823 | 12 | 17 |
| 8 | 28 | (Mexico) Mario Domínguez | Pacific Coast Motorsports | 64 | +16.077 | 15 | 16 |
| 9 | 21 | (Switzerland) Neel Jani | PKV Racing | 64 | +16.199 | 11 | 13 |
| 10 | 9 | (United Kingdom) Justin Wilson | RuSPORT | 64 | +16.954 | 5 | 11 |
| 11 | 29 | (United States) Alex Figge | Pacific Coast Motorsports | 63 | + 1 Lap | 17 | 10 |
| 12 | 34 | (France) Nelson Philippe | Conquest Racing | 63 | + 1 Lap | 13 | 9 |
| 13 | 8 | (Canada) Alex Tagliani | Rocketsports Racing | 62 | + 2 Laps | 14 | 8 |
| 14 | 7 | (Mexico) David Martínez | Forsythe Racing | 58 | + 6 Laps | 10 | 7 |
| 15 | 19 | (United Kingdom) Katherine Legge | Dale Coyne Racing | 56 | Mechanical | 16 | 6 |
| 16 | 14 | (Netherlands) Robert Doornbos | Minardi Team USA | 12 | Mechanical | 3 | 6 |
| 17 | 4 | (United Kingdom) Dan Clarke | Minardi Team USA | 0 | Mechanical | 9 | 4 |

The final race of the season got off to a ragged start as Oriol Servià, Nelson Philippe, and Alex Tagliani all stalled on the grid. At the front, Will Power held off Sébastien Bourdais at the start and took charge of the field behind the pace car. A potential fight for second place in the championship standings between Justin Wilson and Robert Doornbos was blunted when Doornbos' car developed a clutch problem. Doornbos' mechanics valiantly worked to fix the problem in the hopes of securing the point for fastest lap, and after 51 minutes of work, Doornbos did exactly that, securing his third place in the championship over Will Power.

At the front of the race Bourdais was working with a bit of a disadvantage for the race because he and teammate Graham Rahal were docked 22 seconds off the allotted 75 seconds of Power-to-Pass time after they laid rubber down on their grid spots making practice starts during the Sunday morning session. But Bourdais was able to get the power down coming out of the Peraltada corner before Power could. This slight handling difference gave Bourdais a critical speed advantage at the end of the long main straight. Bourdais easily passed Power on the main straight on lap 24 and then held off the Australian for the rest of the race, even after a late race yellow flag tightened up the field.

Bourdais' victory in his final Champ Car race before heading off to Formula One for the 2008 season was his 31st overall, putting him into a tie for 6th on the all-time Champ Car victory list with Paul Tracy and Al Unser Jr.

Highlighting the race behind the Bourdais and Power was the performance of Oriol Servià who recovered from the stall on the grid and fought through the entire field all the way to third place. His performance allowed him to leapfrog from ninth to sixth place in the final championship standings.

== Caution flags ==
| Laps | Cause |
|---|---|
| 1-3 | Servià (22), Philippe (34), Tagliani (8) stalled on grid; Clarke (4) off course |
| 55-59 | Debris; Legge (11) stalled |

== Notes ==
| Laps | Leader |
|---|---|
| 1-23 | Will Power |
| 24-64 | Sébastien Bourdais |

| Driver | Laps led |
|---|---|
| Sébastien Bourdais | 41 |
| Will Power | 23 |

- New Track Record: Will Power: 1:23.558 (Qualification Session #2)
- New Race Lap Record: Robert Doornbos: 1:24.713
- New Race Record: Sébastien Bourdais: 1:45:02.885
- Average Speed: 101.403 mph

== Final Championship standings ==
- **Bold** indicates the Season Champion.

Drivers' Championship standings

| Pos | Driver | Points |
|---|---|---|
| 1 | (France) **Sébastien Bourdais** | 364 |
| 2 | (United Kingdom) Justin Wilson | 281 |
| 3 | (Netherlands) Robert Doornbos | 268 |
| 4 | (Australia) Will Power | 262 |
| 5 | (United States) Graham Rahal | 243 |

- Note: Only the top five positions are included.

| Previous race: 2007 Lexmark Indy 300 | Champ Car World Series; 2007 season | Next race: 2008 Toyota Grand Prix of Long Beach; IndyCar Series event |
| Previous race: 2006 Gran Premio Telmex | 2007 Gran Premio Tecate | Next race: 2008 Gran Premio Tecate cancelled by IndyCar/Champ Car merger |
