= 2007 Champ Car World Series =

American motorsport season

2007 Champ Car season
- Champ Car World Series

Season
- Races: ~~17~~ 14
- Start date: April 8
- End date: November 11

Awards
- Drivers' champion: (France) Sébastien Bourdais
- Rookie of the Year: (Netherlands) Robert Doornbos

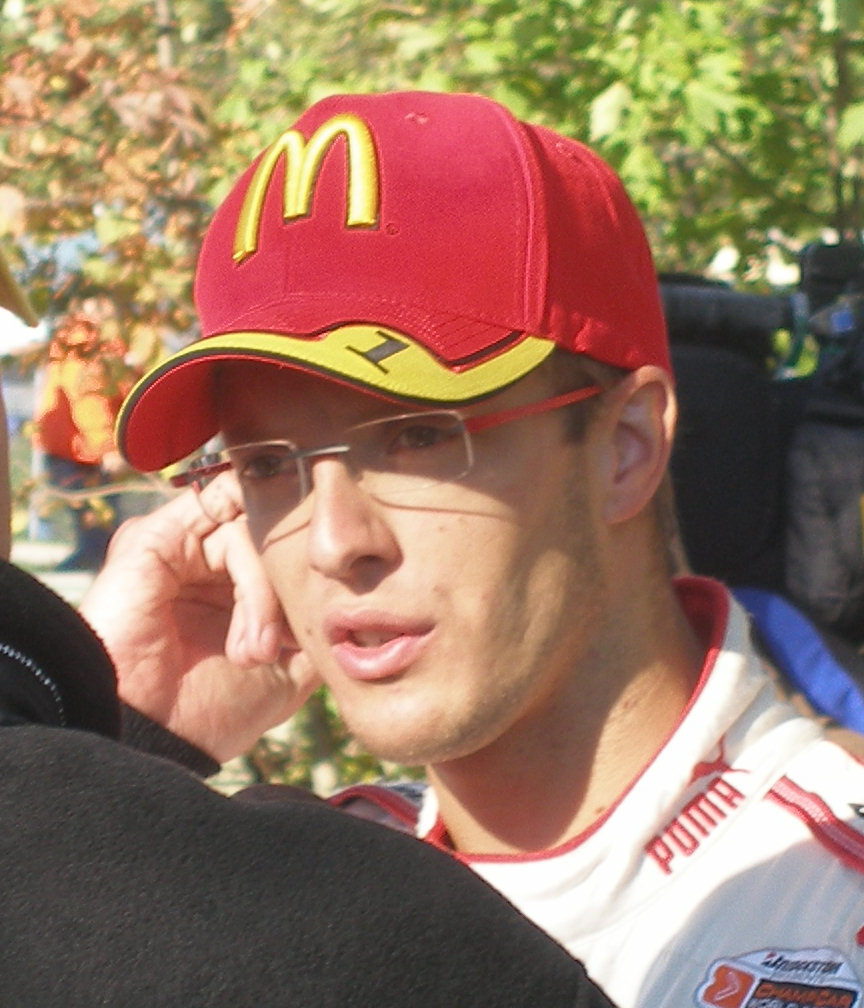
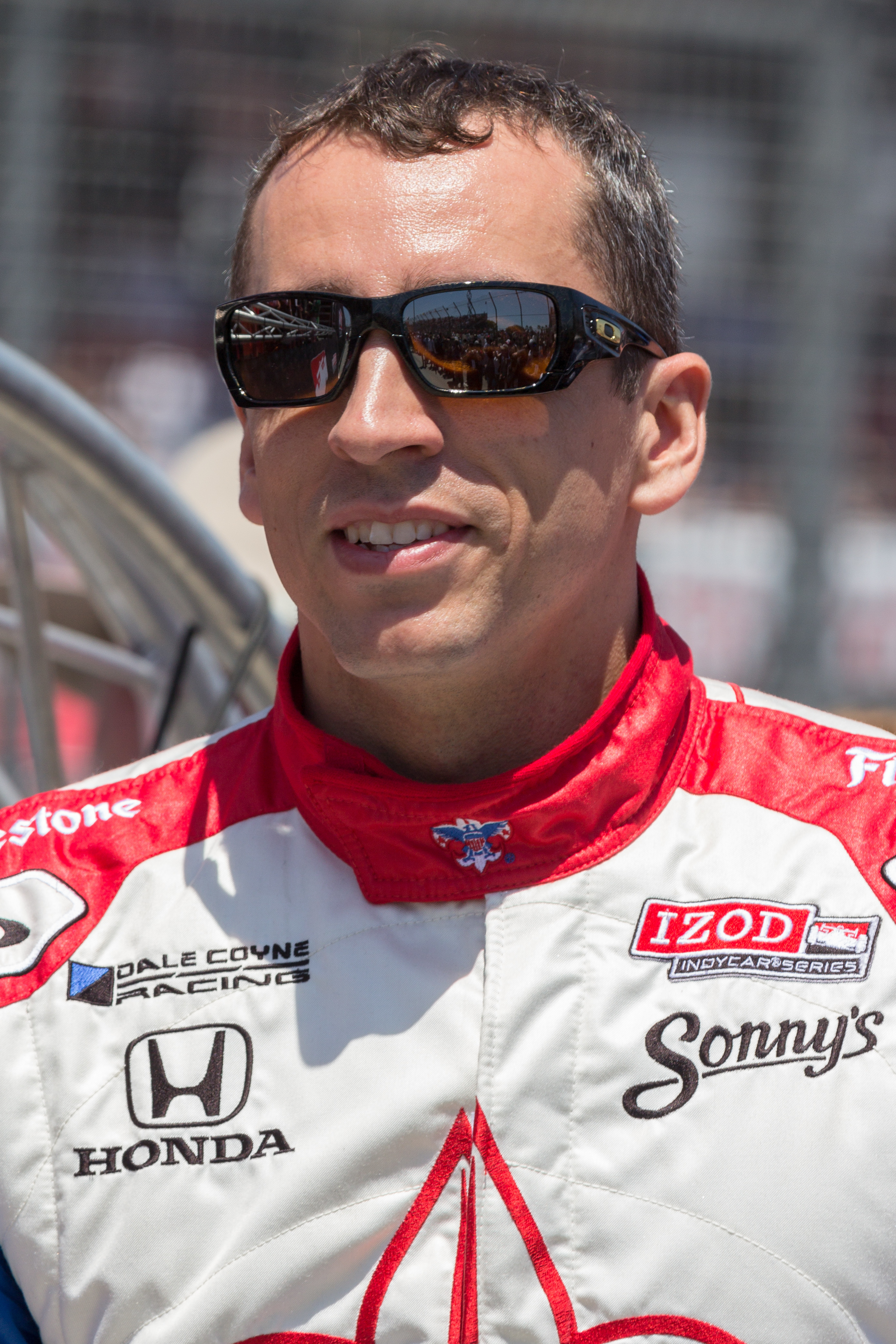
Sébastien Bourdais (left) won the Champ Car World Series driver's title for the fourth time; Justin Wilson (right) finished second in points.

The 2007 Champ Car World Series season was the fourth and final season of the Champ Car World Series, and the 29th season of the series dating back to the 1979 formation of Championship Auto Racing Teams (CART). It began on April 8, 2007 and ended on November 11 after 14 races. Unbeknownst at the time, this would end up being the final contested season of Champ Car, as the following February, the series unified with the Indy Racing League (IRL), marking the end of the Champ Car World Series for good.

French driver Sébastien Bourdais entered the season as the defending champion, and went on to score his fourth consecutive title, becoming the first driver in Champ Car and American open-wheel racing history to do so. It was his final year in the series before moving on to Formula 1, regardless of the subsequent unification of the sport. It also marked the last time that a driver of an American open-wheel championship clinched the title before the final race of the season until 2023, when Alex Palou won the IndyCar title. As of 2026, the 2007 Champ Car season remains the only major American open-wheel racing series season in history not to feature any events on oval tracks with all rounds during the season taking place on road courses and street circuits.

The season also saw the series debut a new spec chassis, the Panoz DP01, which replaced the Lola B02/00 that had been used in the CART/Champ Champ series since 2002 and which had been the spec series chassis used by all Champ Car teams during the 2005 and 2006 seasons. Due to the 2008 reunification this also turned out to be the only full season of usage for DP01, though it would be used for one final time for the "Champ Car finale" at Long Beach in 2008 before being retired. This was also the last full season of involvement in American-open wheel racing for Cosworth, whose XFE turbo-V8 had been the spec engine for the series since 2003. Cosworth had been providing engines in American open-wheel racing since 1975.

== Background and series news ==
Champ Car underwent some major changes for 2007. The opening race of the season was switched from the Grand Prix of Long Beach to Las Vegas for the first running of the Vegas Grand Prix, and the series was slated to race in Europe for the first time since 2003. Also, the entire schedule was held on road courses and street circuits for the first time in history.

The name of the series reverted to Champ Car World Series, after both Bridgestone and Ford Motor Company concluded their sponsorship deals. Bridgestone extended its deal as the official tire supplier for the series in November 2006, but Ford withdrew entirely from the series in January 2007. Mazda took over as the new pace car and courtesy vehicle supplier, but elected not to badge the engines, with Cosworth having been sold to Kevin Kalkhoven by Ford.

ESPN announced a new, multiyear agreement that marked the return of the Champ Car World Series to the network in 2007. On January 23, 2007, Champ Car unveiled its new logo for the Champ Car World Series and the Atlantic Series, with a design that included the new Panoz DP01 chassis on the right with an emphasis on a chicane-style layout, representing the street track racing that dominated Champ Car.

== Rule changes ==
Champ Car officials confirmed that Panoz would be the sole chassis supplier for the series for three years beginning in 2007. The Panoz DP01 was built by sister company Élan Motorsport Technologies and was powered by a turbo-charged Cosworth engine. The new formula was reported to significantly lower the costs of competing in the series, which was in turn expected to increase car counts for the 2007 Champ Car season. However, 2007 entries did not exceeded those of 2006.

The new rules of the 2007 season included the implementation of standing starts at venues where they could be safely implemented, being introduced in the fourth round of the season at Portland. Additionally, all events were time limited to 1 hour 45 minutes instead of running a set number of laps. As the time limit approached, the drivers were notified that they were beginning the last lap. The leader would not be shown the white flag, which was instead employed in a similar manner to its use by the FIA. Teams were also allowed unlimited access to their tires during all qualifying sessions. The requirement for each team to use at least one set of the alternate Bridgestone Potenzas during the race would remain in place.

Starting this season drivers no longer received a bonus point for leading a lap of the race.

== Confirmed entries ==
The following teams and drivers competed in the 2007 Champ Car World Series season. All teams used a Cosworth 2.65-litre turbocharged V8 engine, a Panoz DP01 chassis, and Bridgestone tires.

Team	No.	Driver(s)	Round(s)	Ref(s)
(United States) Newman/Haas/Lanigan Racing	1	(France) Sébastien Bourdais	All	
(United States) Newman/Haas/Lanigan Racing	2	(United States) Graham Rahal R	All	
(United States) Forsythe Racing	3	(Canada) Paul Tracy	1–2, 4–14 (Note: Practiced for round 2, but withdrew from the event due to a compression fracture to his back.)	
(United States) Forsythe Racing	3	(Spain) Oriol Servià	2–3	
(United States) Forsythe Racing	7	(Mexico) Mario Domínguez	1–3	
(United States) Forsythe Racing	7	(Spain) Oriol Servià	4–12	
(United States) Forsythe Racing	7	(Mexico) David Martinez R	13–14	
(United Kingdom) Minardi Team USA	4	(United Kingdom) Dan Clarke	All (Note: Practiced for round 11, but was suspended for the rest of the event for reckless driving.)	
(United Kingdom) Minardi Team USA	4	(Mexico) Mario Domínguez	11	
(United Kingdom) Minardi Team USA	14	(Netherlands) Robert Doornbos R	All	
Team Australia	5	(Australia) Will Power	All	
Team Australia	15	(France) Simon Pagenaud R	All	
(United States) RSPORTS (United States) Rocketsports Racing	8	(Canada) Alex Tagliani	1–10	
(United States) RSPORTS (United States) Rocketsports Racing	8	(Canada) Alex Tagliani	11–14	
(United States) RSPORTS (United States) RuSPORT	9	(United Kingdom) Justin Wilson	1–10	
(United States) RSPORTS (United States) RuSPORT	9	(United Kingdom) Justin Wilson	11–14	
(United States) Dale Coyne Racing	11	(United Kingdom) Katherine Legge	All	
(United States) Dale Coyne Racing	19	(Brazil) Bruno Junqueira	All	
(United States) PKV Racing	21	(Switzerland) Neel Jani R	All	
(United States) PKV Racing	22	(France) Tristan Gommendy R	1–12 (Note: Practiced for round 8, but withdrew from the event due to an edema of two thoracic vertebrae.)	
(United States) PKV Racing	22	(Mexico) Mario Domínguez	8	
(United States) PKV Racing	22	(Spain) Oriol Servià	13–14	
(United States) Pacific Coast Motorsports	28	(United Kingdom) Ryan Dalziel R	1–8, 10–12	
(United States) Pacific Coast Motorsports	28	(Mexico) Mario Domínguez	9, 13–14	
(United States) Pacific Coast Motorsports	29	(United States) Alex Figge R	All (Note: Practiced for round 3, but withdrew from the event due to a back injury sustained at the previous round.)	
(United States) Pacific Coast Motorsports	29	(Brazil) Roberto Moreno	3	
(United States) Conquest Racing	34	(New Zealand) Matt Halliday R	1–3	
(United States) Conquest Racing	34	(Belgium) Jan Heylen	4–12	
(United States) Conquest Racing	34	(France) Nelson Philippe	13–14	

=== Driver changes ===
==== Preseason ====
- On September 3, 2006, Pacific Coast Motorsports announced rookies Alex Figge and Ryan Dalziel as the drivers of their newly announced two-car programme for 2007. Both drivers had shared a car for Pacific Coast during two seasons in the American Le Mans Series and Grand-Am Sports Car Series, after being competitors in the Atlantic Championship.
- On January 22, 2007, RuSPORT announced it would retain Justin Wilson, who signed a multi-year deal after two seasons with the team. Wilson had previously been linked with vacancies at Newman/Haas and Forsythe.
- On January 22, PKV Racing announced Neel Jani as its first driver for the 2007 season, making his debut in the series. Jani switched from the A1 Grand Prix series, where he was a runner-up with Team Switzerland in 2005.
- On February 13, Team Australia completed their line-up with the addition of the reigning Champ Car Atlantic champion Simon Pagenaud, who took the place occupied by Alex Tagliani in 2006 after a successful open test appearance.
- On March 8, Rocketsports Racing announced the return of Alex Tagliani, who previously drove for the team in 2003 and 2004, and had done both Open Tests in that seat. As the team later joined forces with RuSPORT, Tagliani drove for RSPORTS during the first ten races before the alliance was reverted.
- On March 9, PKV Racing announced Tristan Gommendy for their #22 car. Gommendy had raced in 2006 in both the GP2 Series and Formula Renault 3.5, where he finished fourth in 2005.
- On March 28, Minardi Team USA announced their full line-up for 2007 with the return of Dan Clarke and the signing of Robert Doornbos, who replaced Nelson Philippe in the team. Doornbos competed for Red Bull Racing in the last three rounds of the 2006 Formula One season, and had done all preseason testing for Minardi Team USA, while Clarke's car had been tested by Philippe and Zsolt Baumgartner.
- On March 29, Newman/Haas/Lanigan formally announced 18-year old Graham Rahal for its second car, previously raced by Bruno Junqueira. Rahal, the son of three time champion Bobby Rahal, had finished second in Champ Car Atlantic, and drove the #2 car during all preseason testing.
- On March 29, Forsythe Championship Racing announced the surprise return of Mario Domínguez for a three-race deal, less than a year after being fired from the team before the fifth race of 2006. Domínguez had tested in the off-season for RuSPORT, who eventually did not field a second car. Forsythe had previously negotiated with Jos Verstappen, although the team was keen on downsizing to a one-car operation, and would only run Paul Tracy during winter testing.
- On April 3, Conquest Racing announced Matt Halliday as their lone driver for the first three races. Halliday, a former Indy Lights driver, switched from Formula V6 Asia, where he was runner-up, and was also racing in A1 Grand Prix for second-placed Team New Zealand.
- On April 6, Dale Coyne Racing formalized the participation of its preseason testing line-up, Bruno Junqueira and Katherine Legge, at the Vegas Grand Prix, with both drivers switching from Newman/Haas Racing and PKV Racing. Although no formal announcement was made, Junqueira and Legge raced the full season.

==== Mid-season ====
- On April 14, Forsythe Championship Racing confirmed that Paul Tracy would miss the Grand Prix of Long Beach due to a compression fracture in his back sustained in a practice crash on Saturday morning, which was initially slated to keep him out for as long as three months. Oriol Servià was announced as the replacement driver for the rest of the weekend. On April 18, Servia was confirmed to drive at Houston.
- On April 21, Pacific Coast Motorsports driver Alex Figge withdrew from the Grand Prix of Houston, citing back pain suffered in a crash at Long Beach. He was replaced by Champ Car veteran Roberto Moreno, making his first start in the series since 2003.
- On May 17, second-year driver Jan Heylen announced it would race at the Belgian Champ Car Grand Prix with Conquest Racing, pending sponsorship agreements, with the possibility of competing in further events. On June 1, Conquest announced Heylen was signed for the rest of the season with immediate effect, after the end of Matt Halliday's three-race deal.
- On May 22, amidst the impending return of Paul Tracy at Portland, Forsythe Championship Racing announced it would retain Oriol Servià in its second car for the rest of the season, replacing Mario Domínguez after the conclusion of his three-race deal.
- Over the summer, Mario Domínguez served as a replacement driver for three different teams, being readily available because of his role as the driver of the Champ Car 2-seater program:
  - On July 22, Domínguez replaced Tristan Gommendy for PKV Racing at Edmonton, after Gommendy suffered a couple of microscopic fractures in a Friday practice session accident on Friday.
  - On July 25, Domínguez was announced by Pacific Coast Motorsports for San Jose to replace Ryan Dalziel, who had sufferied a broken collarbone while training on his bicycle.
  - On August 24, Dan Clarke was banned from the Belgian Champ Car Grand Prix after causing a four car pile up in the first practice session at Zolder, which involved himself, Paul Tracy, Justin Wilson and hometown hero Jan Heylen. The next day, Clarke was replaced for the rest of the weekend at Minardi Team USA by Domínguez.
- On September 11, Forsythe Championship Racing announced David Martínez would replace Oriol Servià in the No. 7 car for the Surfers Paradise and Mexico City races. Martínez had remained on the sidelines for most of the season after making his debut at Mexico City the previous year.
- On September 20, Mario Domínguez replaced Ryan Dalziel again in the No. 28 Pacific Coast Motorsports car, this time for the Surfers Paradise and Mexico City races.
- On October 3, Conquest Racing announced Nelson Philippe would replace Jan Heylen in the No. 34 Conquest Racing car for the Surfers Paradise and Mexico City races, with the team being unable to provide Heylen with a second car. Philippe was thus able to attempt a defense of his race win at Surfers, after not racing for all of 2006.
- On October 16, Oriol Servià returned to the grid without missing a race after signing with PKV Racing for the Surfers Paradise race in place of Tristan Gommendy due to "an unresolved business situation". Servià remained in the car for the Mexico City finale.

=== Team changes ===
- On July 30, 2006, Champ Car Atlantic team Gelles Racing announced a new two-car Champ Car program for 2007, with the blessing of series officials. However, no further developments or announcements were made in the following months, and the team eventually cancelled their Panoz DP01 orders.
- On September 3, Pacific Coast Motorsports announced it would step up to the Champ Car World Series in 2007 with a two-car operation, after racing previously in the Atlantic Championship, the American Le Mans Series and the Grand-Am Sports Car Series.
- On December 18, former F1 team principal Paul Stoddart announced it had acquired a controlling interest in CTE-HVM Racing. The team was renamed as Minardi Team USA in the style of former Formula 1 team Minardi, which had been owned by Stoddart between 2001 and 2005.
- On February 3, 2007, team owner Éric Bachelart announced that Conquest Racing would downsize its operations to one car, after Mi-Jack decided to not self-fund the team in its co-ownership role. One day earlier, a self-imposed deadline to find sponsorship and keep the team running was met with a last-minute sponsorship deal, shortly after employees had been told Conquest would be closed.
- On March 6, Mi-Jack announced it had sold back its ownership share in Conquest Racing. On March 9, Mi-Jack owner Mike Lanigan was announced as a new partner of Newman/Haas Racing, with the team being renamed as Newman/Haas/Lanigan Racing.
- On March 29, RuSPORT and Rocketsports Racing announced a strategic and economic alliance that would see both teams merge as RSPORTS under the joint ownership of Dan Pettit and Paul Gentilozzi. Before the eleventh race of the season at Zolder, it was announced that the two teams would revert to compete separately under their original names.

== Schedule ==
The 15-race schedule was first released on September 27, 2006. It was expanded to 17 races on January 16, 2007.

Icon	Legend
R	Road course
S	Street circuit
C	Cancelled race

Rd.	Date	Race Name	Track	Location
1	April 8	(United States) Vegas Grand Prix	S Streets of Las Vegas	Las Vegas, Nevada
2	April 15	(United States) Toyota Grand Prix of Long Beach	S Streets of Long Beach	Long Beach, California
3	April 22	(United States) Grand Prix of Houston	S JAGFlo Speedway at Reliant Park	Houston, Texas
C	May 20	Champ Car China Grand Prix	R Zhuhai International Circuit	Zhuhai, China
4	June 10	(United States) Mazda Champ Car Grand Prix of Portland	R Portland International Raceway	Portland, Oregon
5	June 24	(United States) Champ Car Grand Prix of Cleveland	R Cleveland Burke Lakefront Airport	Cleveland, Ohio
6	July 1	(Canada) Champ Car Mont-Tremblant	R Circuit Mont-Tremblant	Mont-Tremblant, Quebec
7	July 8	(Canada) Steelback Grand Prix of Toronto	S Exhibition Place	Toronto, Ontario
8	July 22	(Canada) Rexall Grand Prix of Edmonton	R Edmonton City Centre Airport Speedway	Edmonton, Alberta
9	July 29	(United States) San Jose Grand Prix	S Streets of San Jose	San Jose, California
10	August 12	(United States) Generac Grand Prix	R Road America	Elkhart Lake, Wisconsin
C	August 19	(United States) Grand Prix of Denver	S Denver Civic Center	Denver, Colorado
11	August 26	(Belgium) Belgian Champ Car Grand Prix	R Circuit Zolder	Heusden-Zolder, Belgium
12	September 2	(Netherlands) Bavaria Champ Car Grand Prix	R TT Circuit Assen	Assen, Netherlands
13	October 21	(Australia) Lexmark Indy 300	S Surfers Paradise Street Circuit	Surfers Paradise, Australia
14	November 11	(Mexico) Gran Premio Tecate	R Autódromo Hermanos Rodríguez	Mexico City, Mexico
C	December 2	(United States) Grand Prix Arizona	S Streets of Phoenix	Phoenix, Arizona

=== Schedule changes ===
- On September 27, 2006, Champ Car released the 2007 schedule. Notably, the race at the Milwaukee Mile was dropped, which meant that no oval races would be held during the season for the first time in the history of major American open-wheel racing. The Grand Prix of Monterrey was also discontinued after six seasons. Both events were replaced with street races at Las Vegas and Phoenix, organized by the same promoter and intended to bookend the season, a role held by Long Beach and Mexico over the previous years. Amid interest from NASCAR, the Montreal race was switched for a return to Mont-Tremblant, which had hosted USAC Indy car races in the 1960's, and the fourth attempt on an Asian event was scheduled at Zhuhai, China, after three years of race cancellations at Korean venues.
- On January 16, 2007, the calendar was expanded to 17 races with the addition of a two-legged European trip at Circuit Zolder and TT Circuit Assen, marking the return of the series to the Old Continent after four years.
- On February 1, the Grand Prix of Denver was cancelled for both the 2007 and 2008 seasons, due to scheduling conflicts at the surrounding venues. Although the contract was still in place for a 2009 edition, it would not be fulfilled after the 2008 unification of American open-wheel racing.
- On April 7, Champ Car announced a change of date of the Zolder event from September 9 to August 26, due to its proximity with the Belgian Grand Prix. The series also confirmed the postponement of the Zhuhai race, which had been reported as early as February. A change of date from May 20 to October 28 was officially requested to and rejected by the FIA, which had the ultimate authority over the allocation of IndyCar's international dates. Its president, Max Mosley, confirmed on June 2 that Champ Car had been aware of the situation since early April, while still including the race in its schedules since.
- On August 28, the Grand Prix Arizona was cancelled by its promoters due to a lack of corporate support. This eventually led to Champ Car terminating its deal for both this race and Las Vegas for 2008. Champ Car also confirmed that the Zhuhai race wouldn't take place in 2007. While originally "postponed" to 2008, it would not feature on the following season's prospective calendar.

== Results ==
Rd.	Race	Pole position	Fastest lap	Led most laps	Race winner		
Rd.	Race	Pole position	Fastest lap	Led most laps	Driver	Team	Report
1	(United States) Las Vegas	(Australia) Will Power	(Australia) Will Power	(Australia) Will Power	(Australia) Will Power	Team Australia	Report
2	(United States) Long Beach	(France) Sébastien Bourdais	(France) Simon Pagenaud	(France) Sébastien Bourdais	(France) Sébastien Bourdais	(United States) Newman/Haas/Lanigan Racing	Report
3	(United States) Houston	(Australia) Will Power	(France) Sébastien Bourdais	(France) Sébastien Bourdais	(France) Sébastien Bourdais	(United States) Newman/Haas/Lanigan Racing	Report
4	(United States) Portland	(United Kingdom) Justin Wilson	(France) Sébastien Bourdais	(United Kingdom) Justin Wilson	(France) Sébastien Bourdais	(United States) Newman/Haas/Lanigan Racing	Report
5	(United States) Cleveland	(France) Sébastien Bourdais	(France) Sébastien Bourdais	(Australia) Will Power	(Canada) Paul Tracy	(United States) Forsythe Racing	Report
6	(Canada) Mont-Tremblant	(France) Tristan Gommendy	(France) Sébastien Bourdais	(France) Sébastien Bourdais	(Netherlands) Robert Doornbos	(United Kingdom) Minardi Team USA	Report
7	(Canada) Toronto	(France) Sébastien Bourdais	(France) Sébastien Bourdais	(Spain) Oriol Servià	(Australia) Will Power	Team Australia	Report
8	(Canada) Edmonton	(Australia) Will Power	(France) Sébastien Bourdais	(France) Sébastien Bourdais	(France) Sébastien Bourdais	(United States) Newman/Haas/Lanigan Racing	Report
9	(United States) San Jose	(United Kingdom) Justin Wilson	(United Kingdom) Justin Wilson	(Spain) Oriol Servià	(Netherlands) Robert Doornbos	(United Kingdom) Minardi Team USA	Report
10	(United States) Road America	(France) Sébastien Bourdais	(France) Sébastien Bourdais	(France) Sébastien Bourdais	(France) Sébastien Bourdais	(United States) Newman/Haas/Lanigan Racing	Report
11	(Belgium) Zolder	(France) Sébastien Bourdais	(France) Sébastien Bourdais	(France) Sébastien Bourdais	(France) Sébastien Bourdais	(United States) Newman/Haas/Lanigan Racing	Report
12	(Netherlands) Assen	(France) Sébastien Bourdais	(United Kingdom) Dan Clarke	(United Kingdom) Justin Wilson	(United Kingdom) Justin Wilson	(United States) RSPORTS	Report
13	(Australia) Surfers Paradise	(Australia) Will Power	(United States) Graham Rahal	(France) Sébastien Bourdais	(France) Sébastien Bourdais	(United States) Newman/Haas/Lanigan Racing	Report
14	Mexico City	(Australia) Will Power	(Netherlands) Robert Doornbos	(France) Sébastien Bourdais	(France) Sébastien Bourdais	(United States) Newman/Haas/Lanigan Racing	Report

== Points standings ==
=== Driver standings ===
Pos	Driver	LAS (United States)	LBH (United States)	HOU (United States)	POR (United States)	CLE (United States)	CMT (Canada)	TOR (Canada)	EDM (Canada)	SJO (United States)	ROA (United States)	ZOL (Belgium)	ASN (Netherlands)	SUR (Australia)	MXC (Mexico)	Pts
1	(France) Sébastien Bourdais	13	**1***	1*	1	**12**	2*	**9**	1*	5	**1***	**1***	**7**	1*	1*	364
2	(United Kingdom) Justin Wilson	14	4	10	**2***	4	5	3	2	**13**	8	5	1*	2	10	281
3	(Netherlands) Robert Doornbos RY	2	13	3	3	2	1	6	11	1	14	7	13	4	16	268
4	(Australia) Will Power	**1***	3	**11**	4	10*	3	1	**15**	4	16	4	14	**16**	**2**	262
5	(United States) Graham Rahal R	17	8	2	9	8	7	11	3	6	3	3	9	11	4	243
6	(Spain) Oriol Servià		2	4	11	7	9	10*	6	3*	4	6	8	14	3	237
7	(Brazil) Bruno Junqueira	7	6	7	13	16	17	5	7	7	9	2	3	3	7	233
8	(France) Simon Pagenaud R	12	14	5	8	5	4	4	4	10	11	12	6	5	6	232
9	(Switzerland) Neel Jani R	10	7	15	12	3	6	2	9	2	10	8	5	8	9	231
10	(Canada) Alex Tagliani	4	5	9	5	6	8	8	14	15	5	9	15	7	13	205
11	(Canada) Paul Tracy	3	Wth		10	1	15	14	5	11	12	10	17	9	5	171
12	(France) Tristan Gommendy R	5	11	13	7	13	**12**	15	Wth	8	7	16	4			140
13	(United Kingdom) Dan Clarke	15	12	17	6	11	14	12	8	17	2	Wth	11	17	17	129
14	(United Kingdom) Ryan Dalziel R	11	9	8	14	9	10	7	12		17	15	10			116
15	(United Kingdom) Katherine Legge	6	10	16	17	15	11	16	16	16	15	11	12	15	15	108
16	(Belgium) Jan Heylen				15	14	16	13	10	9	6	13	2			104
17	(United States) Alex Figge R	8	16	Wth	16	17	13	17	13	14	13	14	16	13	11	95
18	(Mexico) Mario Domínguez	9	17	6					17	12		17		12	8	78
19	(France) Nelson Philippe													6	12	28
20	(Mexico) David Martínez R													10	14	18
21	(New Zealand) Matt Halliday R	16	15	14												18
22	(Brazil) Roberto Moreno			12												9

Color	Result
Gold	Winner
Silver	2nd place
Bronze	3rd place
Green	4th & 5th place
Light Blue	6th–10th place
Dark Blue	Finished (Outside Top 10)
Purple	Did not finish
Red	Did not qualify (DNQ)
Brown	Withdrawn (Wth)
Black	Disqualified (DSQ)
White	Did Not Start (DNS)
White	Race abandoned (C)
Blank	Did not participate

**In-line notation**
**Bold**	Pole position
Italics	Ran fastest race lap
*	Led most race laps
RY	Rookie of the Year
R	Rookie

== See also ==
- 2007 Champ Car Atlantic season
- 2007 Indianapolis 500
- 2007 IndyCar Series
- 2007 Indy Pro Series season

== Notes ==
- Åberg, Andreas. "Champ Car World Series 2007". Driver Database. Archived from the original on November 22, 2008.
- "2007 Champ Car World Series". Champ Car Stats. Archived from the original on May 2, 2009.
- "Standings after Mexico City". Champ Car World Series. Archived from the original on April 11, 2008.
