= IndyCar races in Las Vegas =

American open-wheel races in Las Vegas, Nevada

Izod IndyCar World Championship

IndyCar Series
- Venue: Las Vegas Motor Speedway
- Corporate sponsor: Izod, Honda
- First race: 1996
- Last race: 2011
- Distance: 300.000 miles (482.803 km)
- Laps: 200
- Previous names: Silver State Century (1954); Stardust 150 (1968); Las Vegas 500K (1996-1998); Vegas.com 500 (1999); Vegas Indy 300 (2000); Bridgestone 400 Presented by Corona "Double Down in the Desert" (2004); Champ Car Hurricane Relief 400 "Double Down in the Desert" (2005); Vegas Grand Prix (2007); Izod IndyCar World Championship Presented by Honda (2011)

Premier American open-wheel car racing leagues have hosted events in Las Vegas, Nevada on an intermittent basis since 1954. The latest edition was known as the Izod IndyCar World Championships.

After several short-lived ventures at the Las Vegas Park Speedway, Stardust International Raceway, and Caesars Palace, none of which lasted longer than two years, the Indy Racing League held five races at Las Vegas Motor Speedway in 1996–2000. The Champ Car World Series ran races at the speedway in 2004 and 2005. Champ Car also hosted the one-off Vegas Grand Prix on the streets of Las Vegas in 2007. The track returned to the IndyCar Series' schedule in 2011 for the season finale, which was ultimately cancelled as a result of a 15-car crash which led to the death of Dan Wheldon.

== Race history ==
=== Las Vegas Park Speedway ===
The National Championship Trail, then sanctioned by the American Automobile Association, first raced at Las Vegas in November 1954 via the Silver State Century, a 100-lap race on the 1 mi (1.6 km) Las Vegas Park Speedway. It was the final round of the 1954 season and was to be held over the course of two days—a qualifying session on November 13 and the race on November 14—for safety concerns because the track had never hosted a motorsport event before. The National Championship Car Owners Association initially refused to allow the structuring of the event, as they felt it would be handled better within a single day, but later relented. Jimmy Bryan qualified on the pole position and led all 100 laps en route to victory and the National Championship. Maury Powell, the race's advertising director, stated the event "wasn't too successful," and it was ultimately abandoned despite plans to bring the event back for 1955.

=== Stardust International Raceway ===
Under the auspices of the United States Auto Club (USAC), the National Championship Trail returned to Las Vegas in March 1968 for the inaugural Stardust 150 at Stardust International Raceway, a 3 mi (4.8 km) road course. Mario Andretti dominated the race but was forced to make a pit stop for fuel with five laps remaining, allowing Bobby Unser to assume the lead and earn the win as his car ran out of fuel at the checkered flag. Due to the shady management behind the circuit and the flooding of the nearby Flamingo Wash River which damaged the facility in February 1969, it was permanently closed and never hosted another American open-wheel race.

=== Caesars Palace ===
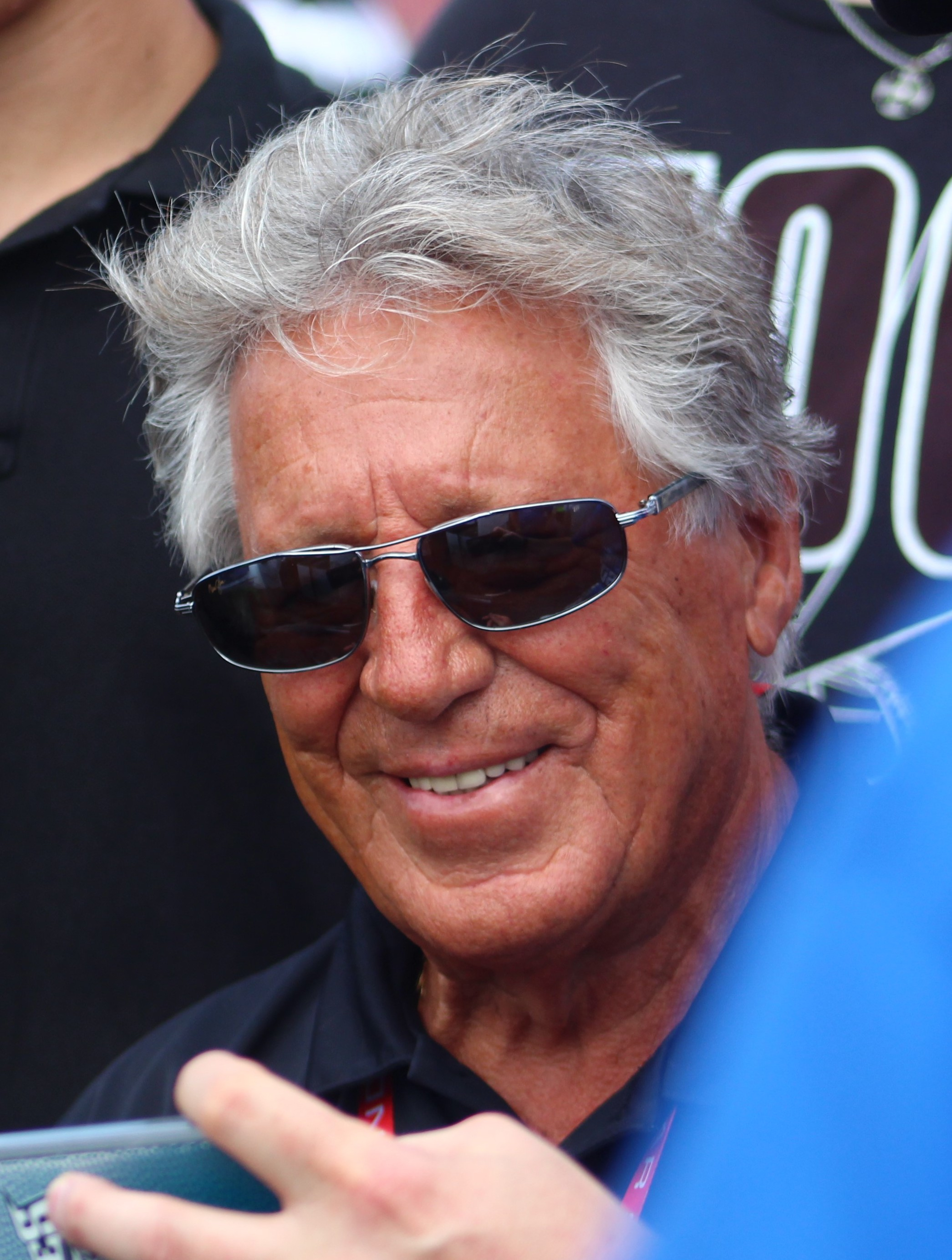
Mario Andretti (pictured in 2018) won the Caesars Palace Grand Prix in 1983.

In November 1981, Championship Auto Racing Teams (CART) announced that a 200 mi (320 km) race would be held on a modified version of the Caesars Palace circuit for the PPG Indy Car World Series in conjunction with Formula One's second annual Caesars Palace Grand Prix in 1982. These plans were halted, however, when the Caesars Palace Grand Prix was rescheduled from October 17 to September 25 and the Federation Internationale du Sport Automobile passed a rule that barred two open-wheel racing series that utilize engines with two or more liters from holding events on the same weekend at the same track.

Because of the unexpectedly low attendance rates, the Caesars Palace Grand Prix was omitted from the Formula One calendar after 1982 and moved to the PPG Indy Car World Series in 1983, in hopes that the series would appeal to the American audience. The circuit was also reconfigured from a 14-turn street course to a five-turn distorted oval course. Mario Andretti won the first CART race at Caesars Palace after out-braking pole sitter John Paul Jr. with six laps remaining. The race also marked the debut of Mario's son, future CART champion Michael Andretti, who retired from the race after completing 93 laps due to gearbox issues.

For 1984, the race was moved to November to act as the season finale and the outside wall at the exit of turn five was moved back five feet to widen the circuit. Tom Sneva trailed Mario Andretti by 18 points in the Drivers' Championship standings, meaning that they both had a chance to win the title heading into the event. Sneva qualified fifth and did not make his way into the first position until the 125th lap. He then engaged in a battle for the lead with Al Unser, which ended on lap 148 when Unser spun into a tire barrier after the two drivers collided. Sneva won the race, but Andretti's second-place finish was enough to secure him his fourth American open-wheel racing championship. The race was dropped from CART's schedule in 1985 because Caesars Palace had lost interest in hosting motorsports events.

=== Las Vegas Motor Speedway ===
Las Vegas Motor Speedway, a 1.5 mi (2.4 km) oval track, was first confirmed to be included on the 1996 calendar of the newly formed Indy Racing League (IRL) in April 1995. Prior to the inaugural running of the Las Vegas 500K in September, a testing session was conducted at the track in June; Richie Hearn set the fastest speed at over 222 mph (357 km/h), breaking a world record for 1.5-mile ovals. Hearn went on to win the IRL's first race at Las Vegas, his sole victory in Indy car racing, in a race that saw eight crashes and four drivers being sent to the hospital for minor injuries.

For the 1997 edition, the start of the race was moved to nighttime. Tony Stewart and Davey Hamilton were both vying for the championship entering the season finale, as the two drivers were a mere ten points apart in the standings. The two championship contenders qualified within the top three positions, but neither driver led a single lap as they opted to race more conservatively. Despite Stewart's faulty suspension which caused him to lose pace, he clinched the title with an 11th place finish. Eliseo Salazar took the lead on the 138th lap and led all but one of the remaining laps to earn his only Indy car racing win. Only 35,000 people reportedly attended the event, down from 67,000 the previous year.

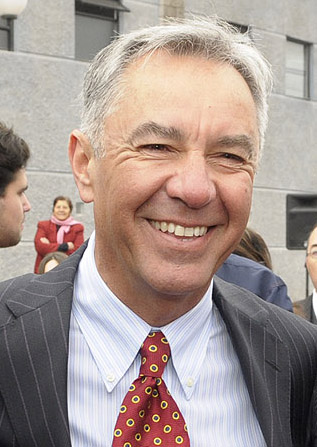
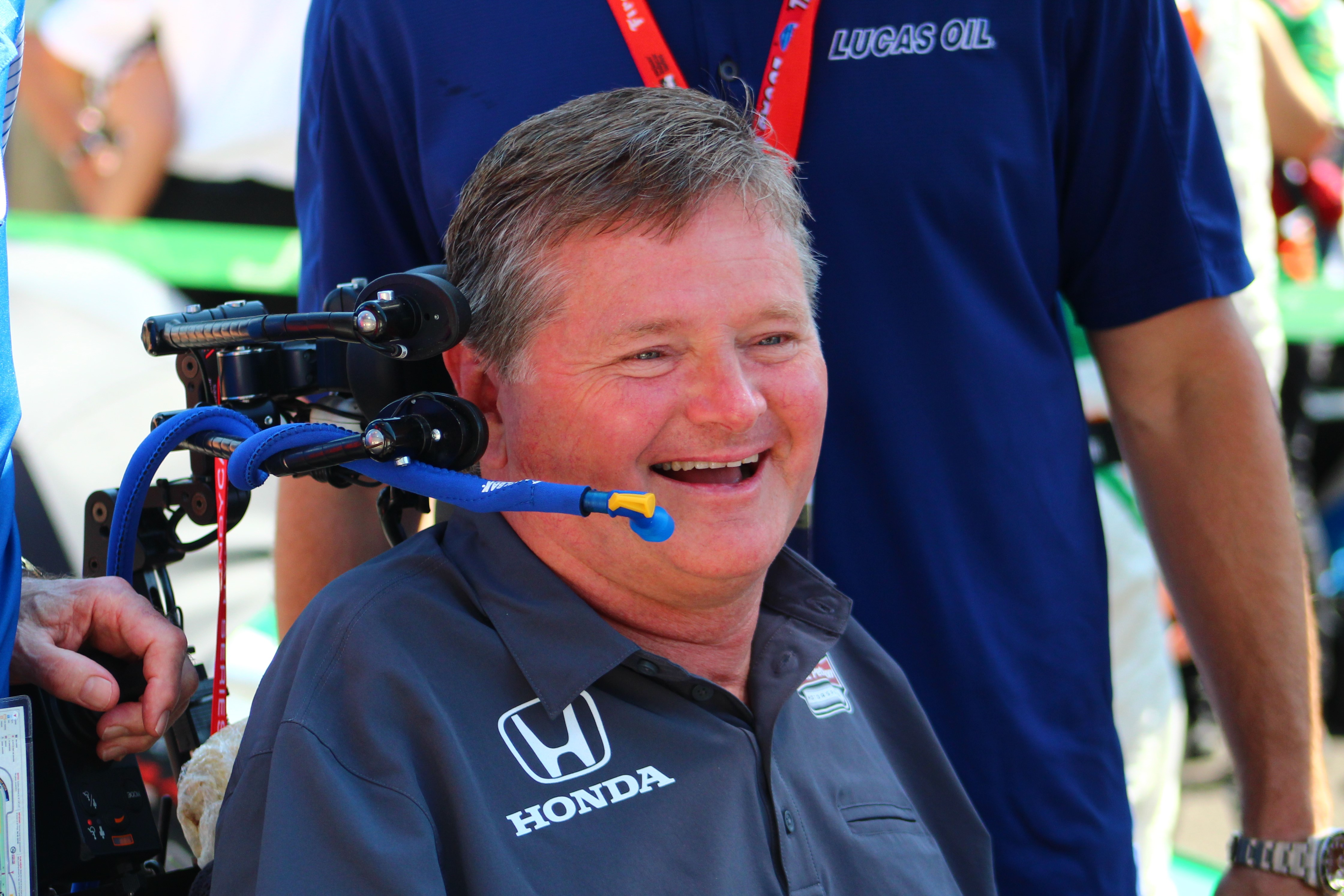
Eliseo Salazar (left) and Sam Schmidt (right) both earned their only American open-wheel car racing wins at Las Vegas Motor Speedway.

The third running of the event in 1998 reinstated the start time in the day. Stewart and Hamilton were again in contention for the title, this time against Kenny Bräck. The race's high attrition rate caught up to the former two contenders; Stewart struggled with handling issues throughout the race, while Hamilton crashed with Roberto Guerrero on lap 124, allowing Bräck to score his first IRL championship. Meanwhile, Arie Luyendyk, who had endured several underwhelming finishes in the 1998 season, overtook John Paul Jr. on lap 169 and fended off Las Vegas native Sam Schmidt to earn his seventh and final American open-wheel win.

Renamed to the Vegas.com 500 in 1999, the race was moved to September and no longer played host to the season finale. Eleven cautions slowed the pace of the race, a record high for IRL events at Las Vegas. Schmidt earned his first pole and victory after passing Bräck with three laps remaining. It wound up being Schmidt's only win in IRL competition as he was left paralyzed following a crash at Walt Disney World Speedway in January 2000.

The fifth running of the event in 2000 was again retitled to the Vegas Indy 300 and pushed back to April, the last race before the 84th Indianapolis 500. Al Unser Jr. utilized a backup car after displaying poor speed in the practice and qualifying sessions and worked his way through the field, avoiding numerous crashes in the process. He assumed the lead on the 188th lap as Scott Goodyear suffered an engine failure and earned his first American open-wheel victory since 1995. Though negotiations were made, low attendance rates forced the IRL to remove Las Vegas Motor Speedway from their schedule for 2001.

In 2004, CART's top-level series—now renamed to the Champ Car World Series and sanctioned by Open-Wheel Racing Series Inc.—returned to Las Vegas for the first time in twenty years with their Bridgestone 400 event, a 400 km (250 mi) race at Las Vegas Motor Speedway held as part of a weekend doubleheader with the NASCAR Craftsman Truck Series. The race came down to an intense battle for the win between Newman/Haas Racing teammates Sébastien Bourdais and Bruno Junqueira; Bourdais used the inside line to his advantage to take the victory.

To honor the victims of Hurricane Katrina, the 2005 event was titled the Champ Car Hurricane Relief 400 and all proceeds were donated to the American Red Cross in order to help fund their recovery efforts. Bourdais' second consecutive win at Las Vegas was not without controversy, as he hit the rear of Paul Tracy's car on lap 123, causing Tracy to slam the outside wall in turn three. Tracy and Forsythe Racing lodged a protest against Bourdais for rough driving, but no penalty was imposed because it was determined that Tracy had failed to properly signal his impending entry to pit road. In its two years at the track, the series did not draw as many fans as the Craftsman Truck Series, and the event was resultantly replaced with the Grand Prix of Road America for 2006.

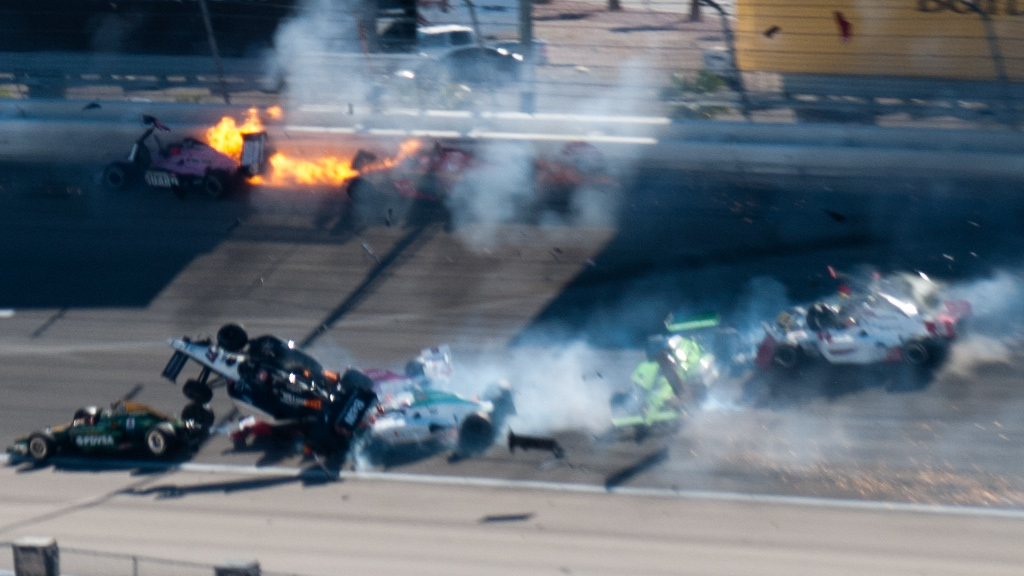
The fiery crash that killed Dan Wheldon.

On February 22, 2011, IndyCar CEO Randy Bernard announced the IndyCar Series' return to Las Vegas Motor Speedway with the 300 mi (480 km) Izod IndyCar World Championships on October 16, which would act as the 2011 season finale and the headliner of a weekend that also included the NASCAR Camping World Truck Series and Firestone Indy Lights. Five million dollars would be awarded to any non-IndyCar Series driver who would start the race at the rear of the field and win. Though the offer attracted drivers from many forms of motorsports, several factors prevented them all from entering the race, so reigning Indianapolis 500 winner Dan Wheldon was chosen to compete for the purse.

Anticipation for the race was only heightened as Dario Franchitti and Will Power both had a chance to win the IndyCar Series championship. The race was cancelled after 12 of the scheduled 200 laps were completed because of a 15-car pileup which claimed the life of Dan Wheldon. In the immediate fallout of Wheldon's death, Randy Bernard was blamed by many fans for allowing the race to be held despite the high danger of the race conditions. On December 8, Bernard revealed that the series would not return to Las Vegas Motor Speedway in 2012.

=== Streets of Las Vegas ===
In July 2006, the Las Vegas City Council approved a 2.440 mi (3.927 km) 14-turn, counterclockwise street circuit in Downtown Las Vegas, near the Fremont Street Experience, for the Champ Car World Series' inaugural Vegas Grand Prix. It was held as the opening round of the 2007 season and was won by Will Power, marking his first win in American open-wheel racing and Team Australia's first victory since 1999. The event was left off of the series' 2008 schedule because the series' leaders severed ties with the race promoters as they feared they would cancel the event, as they did to the Grand Prix Arizona. It also drew the ire of the city's locals, who complained that the circuit's layout blocked several businesses. Plans for the event to return in 2009 never materialized as the Champ Car World Series merged with the IRL IndyCar Series in 2008.

== Race winners ==
Las Vegas Park Speedway

Year	Date	Driver	Team	Chassis	Engine	Race Distance		Race Time	Average Speed (mph)	Report	Ref.
Year	Date	Driver	Team	Chassis	Engine	Laps	Miles (km)	Race Time	Average Speed (mph)	Report	Ref.
1954	November 14	(United States) Jimmy Bryan	Dean Van Lines	Kuzma	Offenhauser	100	100.000 (160.934)	1:10:44	84.818	Report	

Stardust International Raceway

Year	Date	Driver	Team	Chassis	Engine	Race Distance		Race Time	Average Speed (mph)	Report	Ref.
Year	Date	Driver	Team	Chassis	Engine	Laps	Miles (km)	Race Time	Average Speed (mph)	Report	Ref.
1968	March 31	(United States) Bobby Unser	Leader Card Racers	Eagle	Ford	50	150.000 (241.402)	1:19:27	113.269	Report	

Caesars Palace

Year	Date	Driver	Team	Chassis	Engine	Race Distance		Race Time	Average Speed (mph)	Report	Ref.
Year	Date	Driver	Team	Chassis	Engine	Laps	Miles (km)	Race Time	Average Speed (mph)	Report	Ref.
1983	October 8	(United States) Mario Andretti	Newman/Haas Racing	Lola	Cosworth	178	200.250 (322.271)	2:17:48	87.182	Report	
1984	November 11	(United States) Tom Sneva	Mayer Motor Racing	March	Cosworth	178	200.250 (322.271)	2:08:13	93.701	Report	

Las Vegas Motor Speedway

Year	Date	Driver	Team	Chassis	Engine	Race Distance		Race Time	Average Speed (mph)	Report	Ref.
Year	Date	Driver	Team	Chassis	Engine	Laps	Miles (km)	Race Time	Average Speed (mph)	Report	Ref.
IndyCar Series
1996–97	September 15, 1996	(United States) Richie Hearn	Della Penna Motorsports	Reynard	Ford-Cosworth	200	300.000 (482.803)	2:36:17	115.171	Report	
1996–97	October 11, 1997	(Chile) Eliseo Salazar	Team Scandia	Dallara	Oldsmobile	208	312.000 (502.115)	2:11:07	142.757	Report	
1998	October 11	(Netherlands) Arie Luyendyk	Treadway Racing	G-Force	Oldsmobile	208	312.000 (502.115)	2:18:19	135.338	Report	
1999	September 25	(United States) Sam Schmidt	Treadway Racing	G-Force	Oldsmobile	208	312.000 (502.115)	2:29:50	124.196	Report	
2000	March 22	(United States) Al Unser Jr.	Galles Racing	G-Force	Oldsmobile	208	312.000 (502.115)	2:16:57	136.691	Report	
2001 – 2003	Not held										
Champ Car World Series
2004	September 25	(France) Sébastien Bourdais	Newman/Haas Racing	Lola	Ford-Cosworth	166	249.000 (400.726)	1:29:01	167.832	Report	
2005	September 24	(France) Sébastien Bourdais	Newman/Haas Racing	Lola	Ford-Cosworth	166	249.000 (400.726)	1:26:22	172.962	Report	
2006 – 2010	Not held										
IndyCar Series
2011	October 16	Race abandoned after 12 laps — death of Dan Wheldon								Report	

Streets of Las Vegas

Year	Date	Driver	Team	Chassis	Engine	Race Distance		Race Time	Average Speed (mph)	Report	Ref.
Year	Date	Driver	Team	Chassis	Engine	Laps	Miles (km)	Race Time	Average Speed (mph)	Report	Ref.
2007	April 8	(Australia) Will Power	Team Australia	Panoz	Cosworth	68	165.920 (267.022)	1:45:13	93.056	Report	

=== Support race winners ===
Trans-Am Series
Season	Driver	Ref.
1983	(United States) Willy T. Ribbs	
1984	(United States) Tom Gloy	

NASCAR Winston West Series
Season	Driver	Ref.
1983	(United States) Jim Robinson	
1984 – 1998	Not held	
1999	(United States) Kevin Richards	
2000	(United States) David Starr	

SCCA Formula Super Vee Championship
Season	Driver	Ref.
1984	(Canada) Ludwig Heimrath	

USF2000 National Championship
Season	Driver	Ref.
1996	(United States) Steve Knapp	

NASCAR Craftsman Truck Series
Season	Driver	Ref.
1999	(United States) Greg Biffle	
2000 – 2003	Not held	
2004	(United States) Shane Hmiel	
2005	(United States) Todd Bodine	
2006 – 2010	Not held	
2011	(United States) Ron Hornaday Jr.	

Atlantic Championship Series
Season	Driver	Ref.
2007	(Brazil) Raphael Matos	

Indy NXT
Season	Driver	Ref.
2011	(Brazil) Victor Carbone	
