= Oriol Servià =

Spanish racing driver (born 1974)

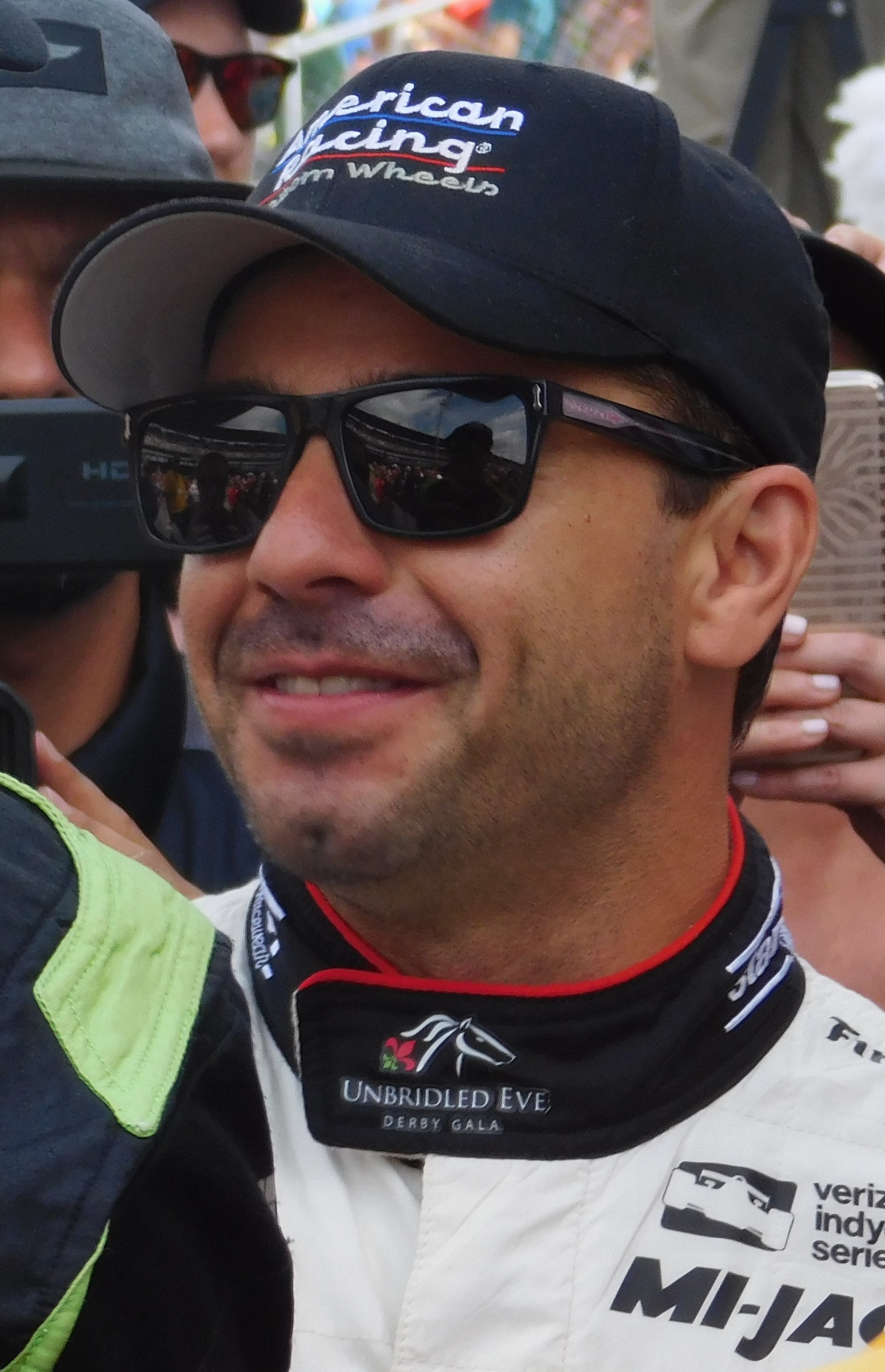
- Servià at the 2017 Indianapolis 500
- Nationality: (Spain) Spanish
- Born: Oriol Servià Imbers; 13 July 1974 (age 52); Pals, Catalonia, Spain

IndyCar Series career
- 79 races run over 9 years
- Team: No. 16 (Rahal Letterman Lanigan Racing)
- 2016 position: 24th
- Best finish: 4th (2011)
- First race: 2002 Indianapolis 500 (Indianapolis)
- Last race: 2019 Indianapolis 500 (Indianapolis)
Wins	Podiums	Poles
0	3	0

Champ Car career
- 126 races run over 8 years
- Years active: 2000–2007
- Team(s): PPI Motorsports (2000); Sigma Autosport (2001); PWR Championship Racing (2002); Patrick Racing (2002–2003); Dale Coyne Racing (2004); Newman/Haas Racing (2005); PKV Racing (2006); Forsythe Championship Racing (2007)
- Best finish: 2nd (2005)
- First race: 2000 Marlboro Grand Prix of Miami (Homestead)
- Last race: 2007 Gran Premio Tecate (Mexico City)
- First win: 2005 Molson Indy Montreal (Montreal)
- Last win: 2005 Molson Indy Montreal (Montreal)
Wins	Podiums	Poles
1	16	1

Previous series
- 2014–15 2011 2006–07 1998–99 1997 1997 1996–97 1994–95 1993 1993: Formula E American Le Mans Series; Rolex Sports Car Series; Indy Lights; British Formula Three Championship; Renault Spider Europe; French Formula Three Championship; Championnat de France Formule Renault; Formula Campus by Renault and Elf; Spanish Touring Car Championship

Championship titles
- 1999: Indy Lights

Oriol Servià Imbers (born 13 July 1974) is a Spanish former racing driver who competed most notably in the IndyCar Series. He raced for Dragon Racing in the 2014–15 Formula E season, and left the series prior to the 2015 Miami ePrix to become managing director for the technical and commercial partnerships of Dragon Racing. Servià holds a degree in mechanical engineering from the Polytechnic University of Catalonia. Since 2018 he also serves as pace car driver at IndyCar races outside the Indianapolis 500.

== Racing career ==
=== Early career ===
Born in Pals, Girona, Catalonia, Spain, Servià started his career in go-karts at a local kart track where he stayed until he was nineteen, before racing in several Formula Three championships. In 1998, he moved to the Dayton Indy Lights series in America. In 1999, Servià won the Indy Lights championship over closest rival Casey Mears. He had no wins that year but five runner-up finishes.

In 2000, Servià joined the PPI Motorsports team in the Champ Car series, as teammate to Cristiano da Matta. Servià moved on to race for the Sigma Autosport (for 2001), Patrick Racing (from the middle of 2002 to the end of 2003, finishing sixth in the championship that year), and Dale Coyne Racing (in 2004, scoring some of the underfunded team's best ever results) teams. Servià also practiced for the 2002 Indianapolis 500 for Walker Racing and Conquest Racing although he failed to get a car into the field.

=== 2005–2006 ===
After starting the 2005 season for Coyne, Servià moved to the Newman/Haas Racing team after two races to replace injured Bruno Junqueira. On 28 August 2005, Servià picked up his first-ever Champ Car victory at the Molson Indy Montreal at Circuit Gilles Villeneuve in Montreal. The win was controversial, as Timo Glock, gambling on fuel, was forced to pull over and allow Servià to take the lead on the final lap after cutting the final chicane while blocking Servià a second time. Glock had been warned about an earlier unfair attempt. Servià ultimately finished as championship runner-up behind team-mate Sébastien Bourdais. In 2006 he joined PKV Racing, alongside British rookie Katherine Legge, with team co-owner Jimmy Vasser scheduled to do a partial season (although Vasser only drove in the season opener at Long Beach). Servià ended the season 11th in the standings with one podium finish, a third at Cleveland.

=== 2007 ===
Without a ride at the beginning of the 2007 season, Servià replaced the injured Paul Tracy at Forsythe Championship Racing. Despite little time in the new Panoz DP01 chassis, Servià earned a runner-up finish in his debut with the team. He then finished fourth in his second replacement start, which earned him a seat for the rest of the season, as he replaced teammate Mario Domínguez at Forsythe. For the season, Servià scored two podiums and four top-five finishes in eleven starts with Forsythe Racing. At San Jose, Servià earned a third place finish after leading a race high 42 laps. But on 12 September 2007, it was announced that Forsythe Championship Racing had named Mexican driver David Martínez to drive the No. 7 INDECK Cosworth/DP01/Bridgestone for the final two Champ Car World Series races of the season. Luckily for Servià in October he was named the new pilot of the No. 22 Pay By Touch PKV Racing Cosworth/DP01/Bridgestone entry replacing Tristan Gommendy for these two races, because Gommendy had some unresolved business situation. The veteran driver finished in the top ten in all but one start this season, and despite missing the season opener, finished sixth in the Series standings.

=== 2008 ===
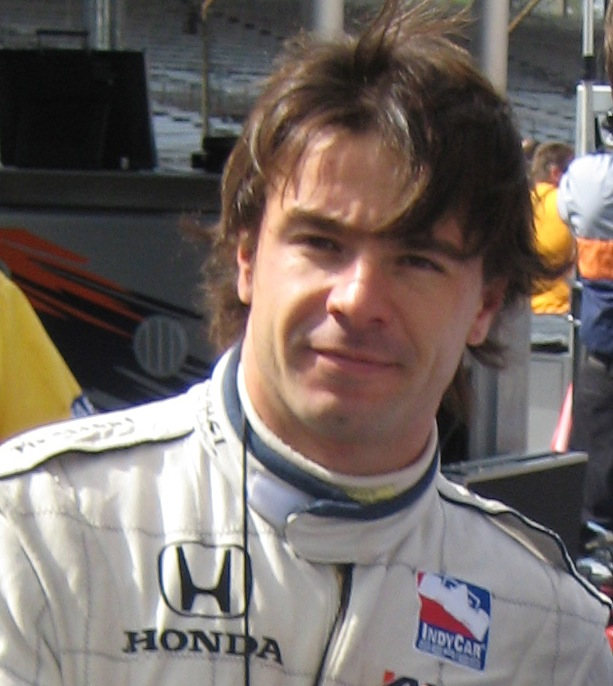
Servià at the Indianapolis Motor Speedway in May 2008.

On 3 January 2008, PKV Racing announced that popular Spanish driver Servià, who had finished sixth in the 2007 Champ Car World Series, would return to the series for 2008 with PKV Racing. However, following Champ Car's unification with the IndyCar Series, the team fields cars for Servià and Will Power in the unified IndyCar Series, under the KV Racing name following Dan Pettit's departure.

Servià finished eleventh at the Indianapolis 500, impressive due to his 25th place start. He stayed in the top-fifteen for most of the race. A week later, he had a remarkable run at Milwaukee. After falling back to 26th position and losing a lap early in the race due to contact with Enrique Bernoldi, he immediately regained his lap on the restart and steadily moved through the field to finish sixth. Following unsuccessful races in Iowa and Texas, Servià improved his best finish in an IRL-spec race by finishing fourth in the Detroit Indy Grand Prix. The final race of the season at the Chicagoland Speedway brought in CDW as a new sponsor.

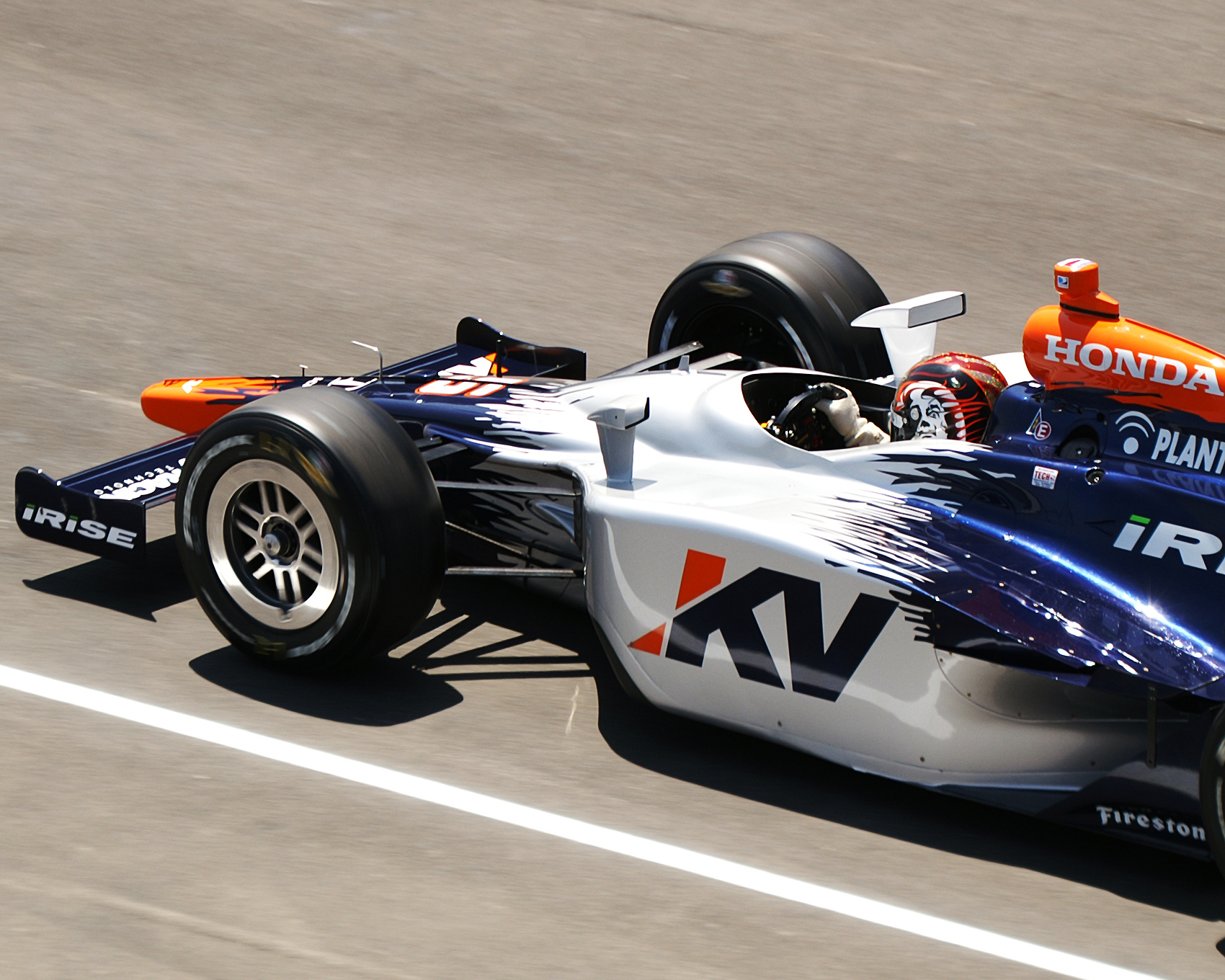
Oriol Servià in the KV Racing machine at The Indianapolis Motor Speedway

The season finished with Servià racking up seven top-ten finishes, five top-five finishes, and a fourth place best finish.

=== 2009 ===
Servià was sidelined for the first three races of the IndyCar Series leading into the Indianapolis 500. He signed a deal with Rahal Letterman Racing to compete in the Indianapolis 500. He qualified on the third day of qualifying at an average speed of 220.984, and finished 26th in the race after dropping out with mechanical problems.

Servià then signed on with Newman/Haas/Lanigan Racing for the Mid-Ohio race after serving as an advisor to Tony Kanaan at Andretti Green Racing.

=== 2011 ===
Due to sponsorship issues at Newman/Haas/Lanigan Racing, Servià sat out the 2010 IndyCar season. However, after picking up Telemundo and CDW as sponsors, Servià was able to make his return for the 2011 season. He had his best season since 2005, by finishing with three podiums, six top-fives, and eleven top-tens on his way to finishing fourth in the points.

Servià also finished runner-up in the controversial race at 2011 MoveThatBlock.com Indy 225. With just ten laps remaining, the green flag was displayed, which resulted in multiple crashes. As the race was then red flagged, with Servià in front, race control decided to reverse the order and declared Andretti Autosport deifer Ryan Hunter-Reay as the winner. Newman/Haas Racing and Chip Ganassi Racing filed protests. After a hearing on 22 August, the result was upheld and the protests denied.

Three weeks later, Servià would score his second runner-up of the season in the Baltimore Grand Prix.

=== 2012 ===
The 2012 season saw a change for Servià, as he moved to the Dreyer & Reinbold Racing team. The season started rough for Servià, due to the use of a Lotus motor that was not competitive compared to the Chevrolet and Honda motors. At the Indianapolis 500, the team switched to Chevrolet power, and Servià's scored his first top-ten of the season. He went on to score three more top-fives to finish thirteenth in points.

=== 2013 ===
Servià began the 2013 IndyCar season with the same team as last year, where he scored one top-five finish at the 2013 São Paulo Indy 300. However, his team ran into sponsorship problems following the 2013 Indianapolis 500. Servià was later signed to drive the Panther Racing National Guard car for Texas and Iowa.

=== 2015 ===
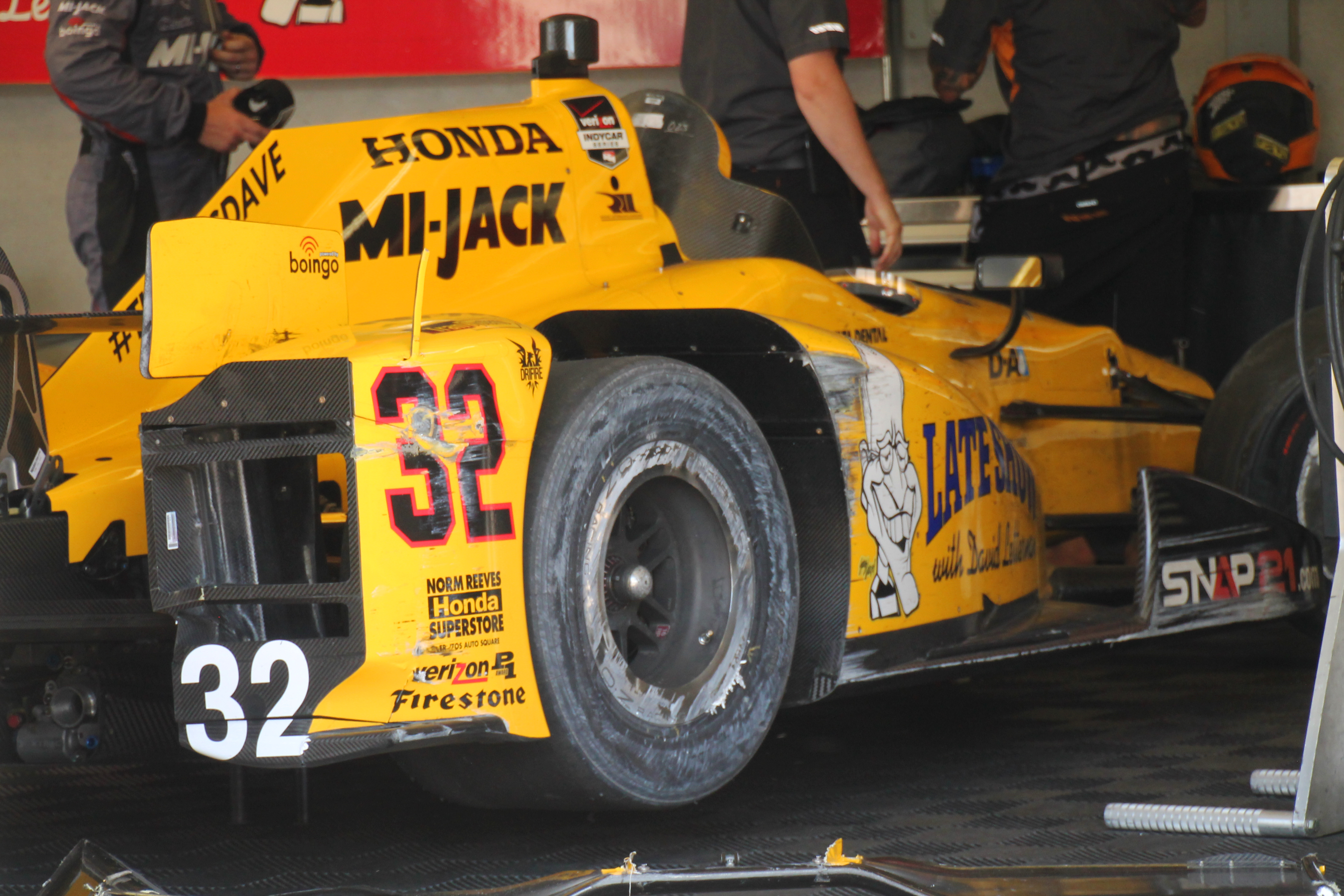
Servià's car in the garage after his collision with Ed Carpenter at the 2015 Indianapolis 500

Servià started the 2015 Indianapolis 500 in the fifth row in thirteenth place. He was unable to complete the race after a collision with Ed Carpenter and the official results had him in 29th place. After Justin Wilson's fatal crash at the ABC Supply 500, Servià took over his car at Sonoma.

=== 2017 ===
In 2017, Servià was signed to a three-race deal with Rahal Letterman Lanigan Racing. He raced at the 2017 Indianapolis 500, and the Detroit doubleheader, finishing 21st, twentieth, and nineteenth, respectively.

=== 2019 ===
Servià drove in the 103rd running of the Indy 500 race in May with Team Stange Racing who worked with Schmidt Peterson Motorsport according to their own Instagram-page as well as their website.

== Career results ==
=== American open–wheel racing results ===
(key) (Races in bold indicate pole position; races in italics indicate fastest lap)

==== Indy Lights ====
Year	Team	1	2	3	4	5	6	7	8	9	10	11	12	13	14	Rank	Points	Ref
1998	Dorricott Racing	MIA; 4	LBH; 19	NAZ; 13	STL; 16	MIL; 14	DET; 6	POR; 21	CLE; 6	TOR; 10	MIS; 5	TRO; 2	VAN; 19	LS; 2	FON; 25	**7th**	**73**	
1999	Dorricott Racing	MIA; 6	LBH; 12	**NAZ**; 2	MIL; 5	**POR**; 2	CLE; 2	TOR; 2	MIS; 5	**DET**; 2	CHI; 4	LS; 7	FON; 14			**1st**	**130**	

==== CART/Champ Car ====
Year	Team	No.	Chassis	Engine	1	2	3	4	5	6	7	8	9	10	11	12	13	14	15	16	17	18	19	20	21	Rank	Points	Ref
2000	PPI Motorsports	96	Reynard 2Ki	Toyota RV8E V8 t	MIA; 19	LBH; 6	RIO; 25	MOT; 24	NZR; 9	MIL; 19	DET; 3	POR; 8	CLE; 23	TOR; 11	MIS; 8	CHI; 15	MDO; 10	ROA; 10	VAN; 11	LS; 17	STL; 5	HOU; 9	SRF; 9	FON; 20		15th	**60**	
2001	Sigma Autosport	22	Lola B01/00	Ford XF V8 t	MTY; 14	LBH; 14	TXS; NH	NZR; 9	MOT; 14	MIL; 14	DET; 16	POR; 9	CLE; 17	TOR; 23	MIS; 11	CHI; 18	MDO; 9	ROA; 10	VAN; 5	LAU; 5	ROC; 10	HOU; 26	LS; 17	SRF; 25	FON; 11	19th	**42**	
2002	PWR Championship Racing	17	Lola B02/00	Toyota RV8F V8 t	MTY; 10	LBH; 11	MOT; 6	MIL	LS	POR	CHI	TOR	CLE													16th	**44**	
2002	Patrick Racing	20	Reynard 02i	Toyota RV8F V8 t										VAN; 14	MDO; 10	ROA; 16	MTL; 16	DEN; 11	ROC; 4	MIA; 17	SRF; 16	FON; 5	MXC; 9			16th	**44**	
2003	Patrick Racing	20	Lola B02/00	Ford XFE V8 t	STP; 12	MTY; 18	LBH; 12	BRH; 4	LAU; 5	MIL; 2	LS; 6	POR; 5	CLE; 6	TOR; 5	VAN; 16	ROA; 18	MDO; 18	MTL; 2	DEN; 3	MIA; 19	MXC; 13	SRF; 19	FON; NH			7th	**108**	
2004	Dale Coyne Racing	11	Lola B02/00	Ford XFE V8 t	LBH; 15	MTY; 14	MIL; 7	POR; 11	CLE; 4	TOR; 9	VAN; 12	ROA; 6	DEN; 6	MTL; 9	LS; 3	LVG; 12	SRF; 13	MXC; 7								10th	**199**^	
2005	Dale Coyne Racing	19	Lola B02/00	Ford XFE V8 t	LBH; 11	MTY; 9																				2nd	**288**	
2005	Newman/Haas Racing	2	Lola B02/00	Ford XFE V8 t			MIL; 3	POR; 16	CLE; 3	TOR; 2	EDM; 2	SJO; 3	DEN; 4	MTL; 1	LVG; 2	**SRF**; 5	MXC; 4									2nd	**288**	
2006	PKV Racing	6	Lola B02/00	Ford XFE V8 t	LBH; 18	HOU; 12	MTY; 8	MIL; 5	POR; 10	CLE; 3	TOR; 12	EDM; 4	SJO; 8	DEN; 15	MTL; 16	ROA; 4	SRF; 13	MXC; 6								11th	**197**	
2007	Forsythe Championship Racing	3	Panoz DP01	Cosworth XFE V8 t	LVG	LBH; 2	HOU; 4																			6th	**237**	
2007	Forsythe Championship Racing	7	Panoz DP01	Cosworth XFE V8 t				POR; 11	CLE; 7	MTT; 9	TOR; 10	EDM; 6	SJO; 3	ROA; 4	ZOL; 6	ASN; 8										6th	**237**	
2007	PKV Racing	22	Panoz DP01	Cosworth XFE V8 t													SRF; 14	MXC; 3								6th	**237**	

- ^ New points system implemented in 2004

==== IndyCar Series ====
Year	Team	No.	Chassis	Engine	1	2	3	4	5	6	7	8	9	10	11	12	13	14	15	16	17	18	19	Rank	Pts	Ref
2002	Walker Racing	15	Dallara	Chevrolet	HMS	PHX	FON	NAZ	INDY; DNQ	TXS	PPIR	RIR	KAN	NSH	MIS	KTY	GAT	CHI	TXS					NC	–	
2008	KV Racing Technology	5	Dallara	Honda	HMS; 12	STP; 7	MOT^{1}		KAN; 11	INDY; 11	MIL; 6	TXS; 26	IOW; 16	RIR; 5	WGL; 23	NSH; 16	MDO; 5	EDM; 5	KTY; 12	SNM; 15	DET; 4	CHI; 17	SRF^{2} 5	9th	358	
2008	KV Racing Technology	5	Panoz DP01	Cosworth				LBH^{1} 5																9th	358	
2009	Rahal Letterman Racing	17	Dallara	Honda	STP	LBH	KAN	INDY; 26	MIL	TXS	IOW	RIR	WGL	TOR	EDM	KTY								21st	115	
2009	Newman/Haas/Lanigan Racing	06	Dallara	Honda													MDO; 11	SNM; 6	CHI; 7	MOT; 4	HMS			21st	115	
2011	Newman/Haas Racing	02	Dallara	Honda	STP; 9																			4th	425	
2011	Newman/Haas Racing	2	Dallara	Honda		ALA; 5	LBH; 6	SAO; 5	INDY; 6	TXS; 21	TXS; 25	MIL; 3	IOW; 14	TOR; 12	EDM; 22	MDO; 8	NHM; 2	SNM; 11	BAL; 2	MOT; 5	KTY; 6	LVS^{3} C		4th	425	
2012	Dreyer & Reinbold Racing	22	Dallara DW12	Lotus	STP; 16	ALA; 13	LBH; 16	SAO; 11																13th	287	
2012	Panther/Dreyer & Reinbold Racing	22	Dallara DW12	Chevrolet					INDY; 4	DET; 5	TXS; 20	MIL; 4	IOW; 21	TOR; 5	EDM; 24	MDO; 25	SNM; 19	BAL; 7	FON; 19					13th	287	
2013	Panther/Dreyer & Reinbold Racing	22	Dallara DW12	Chevrolet	STP; 17	ALA; 15	LBH; 6	SAO; 4	INDY; 11	DET	DET													22nd	233	
2013	Panther Racing	4	Dallara DW12	Chevrolet								TXS; 19	MIL	IOW; 7	POC	TOR	TOR	MDO; 14	SNM	BAL; 12	HOU; 19	HOU; 7	FON; 19	22nd	233	
2014	Rahal Letterman Lanigan Racing	16	Dallara DW12	Honda	STP	LBH; 7	ALA; 20	IMS; 12	INDY; 11	DET	DET	TXS	HOU	HOU	POC	IOW	TOR	TOR	MDO	MIL	SNM	FON		24th	88	
2015	Rahal Letterman Lanigan Racing	32	Dallara DW12	Honda	STP	NLA	LBH	ALA	IMS	INDY; 29	DET	DET	TXS	TOR	FON	MIL	IOW	MDO	POC					32nd	46	
2015	Andretti Autosport	25	Dallara DW12	Honda																SNM; 12				32nd	46	
2016	Team Penske	12	Dallara DW12	Chevrolet	STP; 18	PHX	LBH	ALA	IMS															24th	72	
2016	Schmidt Peterson Motorsports	77	Dallara DW12	Honda						INDY; 12	DET	DET	RDA	IOW	TOR	MDO	POC	TXS	WGL	SNM				24th	72	
2017	Rahal Letterman Lanigan Racing	16	Dallara DW12	Honda	STP	LBH	ALA	PHX	IMS	INDY; 21	DET; 20	DET; 19	TXS	ROA	IOW	TOR	MDO	POC	GTW	WGL	SNM			27th	61	
2018	Scuderia Corsa with Rahal Letterman Lanigan Racing	64	Dallara DW12	Honda	STP	PHX	LBH	ALA	IMS	INDY; 17	DET	DET	TXS	RDA	IOW	TOR	MDO	POC	GTW	POR	SNM			35th	27	
2019	MotoGator Team Stange Racing with Arrow Schmidt Peterson Motorsports	77	Dallara DW12	Honda	STP	COA	ALA	LBH	IMS	INDY; 22	DET	DET	TXS	RDA	TOR	IOW	MDO	POC	GTW	POR	LAG			34th	16	

* Season still in progress.

- ^{1} Run on same day.
- ^{2} Non-points-paying, exhibition race.
- ^{3} The Las Vegas Indy 300 was abandoned after Dan Wheldon died from injuries sustained in a 15-car crash on lap 11.

Years	Teams	Races	Poles	Wins	Top 5s	Top 10s	Indianapolis 500 wins	Championships
9	9	73	0	0	16	30	0	0

==== Indianapolis 500 ====
Year	Chassis	Engine	Start	Finish	Team
2002	Dallara	Chevrolet	DNQ		Walker Racing
2002	Dallara	Infiniti	DNQ		Conquest Racing
2008	Dallara	Honda	25	11	KV Racing Technology
2009	Dallara	Honda	25	26	Rahal Letterman Racing
2011	Dallara	Honda	3	6	Newman/Haas Racing
2012	Dallara	Chevrolet	27	4	Panther/Dreyer & Reinbold Racing
2013	Dallara	Chevrolet	13	11	Panther Dreyer & Reinbold Racing
2014	Dallara	Honda	18	11	Rahal Letterman Lanigan Racing
2015	Dallara	Honda	13	29	Rahal Letterman Lanigan Racing
2016	Dallara	Honda	10	12	Schmidt Peterson Motorsports with Marotti Racing
2017	Dallara	Honda	12	21	Rahal Letterman Lanigan Racing
2018	Dallara	Honda	26	17	Scuderia Corsa with RLL
2019	Dallara	Honda	19	22	MotoGator Team Stange Racing with Arrow Schmidt Peterson

=== Complete Formula E results ===
(key) (Races in bold indicate pole position; races in italics indicate fastest lap)

Year	Team	Chassis	Powertrain	1	2	3	4	5	6	7	8	9	10	11	Pos	Points
2014–15	Dragon Racing	Spark SRT01-e	SRT01-e	BEI; 7	PUT; 7	PDE; 9	BUE; 9	MIA	LBH	MCO	BER	MSC	LDN	LDN	19th	16

Sporting positions
Preceded by Cristiano da Matta	Indy Lights champion 1999	Succeeded by Scott Dixon
