= Grand Prix Arizona =

- Venue: (United States) (Arizona) Streets of Phoenix
- Corporate sponsor: First Data Independent Sales
- First race: never run
- Duration: 1hr 45min
- Previous names: None

The Grand Prix Arizona was a planned annual round of the Champ Car World Series in Phoenix, Arizona, and was going to be an open-wheel race on a temporary street course through downtown Phoenix. The inaugural event was to have taken place from November 30 to December 1, 2007 and would have been continued annually for at least five years had the event not been called off. Financial pressures forced the event's sponsors to cancel the inaugural race.

== History ==
Grand Prix Arizona was owned and organized by local Arizona businessmen Dale Jensen and Bradley Yonover. Yonover and Jensen pitched their idea for bringing the race to downtown Phoenix and won over the support of local leaders, including the Phoenix city council, but had run into significant opposition from local businesses as well as concerns over noise brought up by Maricopa County sheriff Joe Arpaio, as part of the track passed in front of the department's downtown call center.

The operators of nearby Phoenix International Raceway argued that the event's original planned dates were too close to the Checker Auto Parts 500, a NASCAR race that is a major event for the race track. A compromise to postpone the proposed downtown race eased the fears and PIR officials withdrew their opposition, clearing the way for city council approval. A test run of the track held on March 6, 2007, featuring Team Australia drivers Will Power and Simon Pagenaud eased noise concerns and earned the approval of Arpaio, apparently clearing the final hurdle to the race.

== Cancellation ==
Race organizers experienced difficulties in securing adequate sponsorship for the event in spite of the favorable support from the Phoenix city council. The loss of primary sponsor First Data Independent Sales Fresno early in 2007 left the event with inadequate funding, and organizers were unable to line up a replacement.

Although ticket sales for the event had been underway, Grand Prix Arizona officials announced on August 28 that the inaugural event would be cancelled citing lack of economic viability due to insufficient corporate sponsorship. Event organizers were offering full refunds to those who had purchased tickets.

== The Track ==
The Downtown Phoenix circuit was going to be 2.11 miles long and was going to encompass Chase Field and US Airways Center, as well as a good portion of the Downtown Warehouse District. The circuit was set to begin on Jefferson Street, go south on 7th Street, head west on Lincoln Street (with some turns), head north on 1st Avenue across a portion of Madison Street and back to Jefferson Street. A unique aspect of the circuit was that pit road was not on the same straightaway as the start/finish line.

== See also ==
- Phoenix street circuit – the circuit used when the Formula One United States Grand Prix was held in Phoenix from 1989 to 1991
