= Champ Car World Series =

Former single-seater racing championship

- Category: Open-wheel
- Country: International (mostly in United States)
- Inaugural season: 2004
- Folded: 2008
- Fate: Assets merged with IndyCar Series
- Chassis suppliers: Lola (2004–2006); Panoz (2007)
- Engine suppliers: Ford (2004–2006); Cosworth (2007)

Champ Car World Series (CCWS) was an American open-wheel car racing series sanctioned by Open-Wheel Racing Series Inc., a sanctioning body that operated from 2004 to 2008. It was the successor to Championship Auto Racing Teams (CART), which sanctioned open-wheel racing from 1979 until dissolving after the 2003 season.

== Cars ==
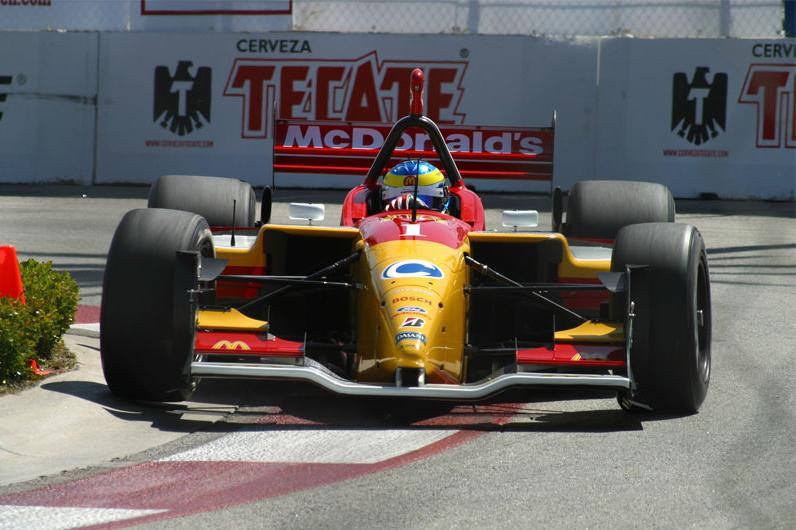
Sébastien Bourdais at the Long Beach Grand Prix in 2005

Champ Cars were single-seat, open-wheel racing cars, with mid-mounted engines. Champ cars had sculpted undersides to create ground effect and prominent wings to create downforce. The cars would use a different aerodynamic kit on the occasions they raced on an oval.

With limited funds, the series continued to use 2002 CART-spec Lola chassis while a new universal chassis was developed by Panoz. It eventually debuted in 2007 as the Panoz DP01. The chassis was well received by drivers and fans.

The series leased 750hp 2.65 L V-8 turbocharged Cosworth XFE engines to teams, which had been purchased by CART for the 2003 season.

== History ==
Following the departure of a number of top teams and engine manufacturers to the rival Indy Racing League (IRL), CART declared bankruptcy after the 2003 season. Gerald Forsythe, Kevin Kalkhoven, and Paul Gentilozzi founded Open-Wheel Racing Series LLC (OWRS) to bid on CART's assets and continue the series as its own entity. The IRL intended to bid a higher amount but had only committed to purchasing the series' Cosworth engines and the sanctioning contract for the Grand Prix of Long Beach, effectively to make the series untenable and allow a takeover on their terms. OWRS was successful, as its bid allowed the highest probability CART vendors would get paid.

Once CART's assets were secured, the series began a major push to be able to field enough cars and drivers for the April Long Beach Grand Prix, with the final drivers announced just before practice began. The series featured three longtime CART teams, Forsythe Championship Racing, Newman/Haas Racing, and Dale Coyne Racing. OWRS also became owners of the Trans-Am Series and the Atlantic Championship. Champ Car was able to maintain a full field and most of CART's street circuit sanctioning agreements for 2004.

Champ Car eventually moved into a 'de facto' all road-course format. The series would experiment with dramatic rule changes, including special compound tires that were to be used for a fixed portion of the race, standing starts, and timed races.

Both Champ Car and the IRL continued to suffer from reduced fields, sponsorship, and television ratings. Merger talks in 2006 were halted after disagreements regarding Champ Car's upcoming Panoz chassis and leaked details of a shared new series upset IMS. The 2007 season saw the withdrawal of Bridgestone and Ford as presenting sponsors and some race cancellations.

By January 2008, both the IRL and Champ Car feared they did not have enough participating cars to maintain their TV and sanctioning contract minimums. After successful merger negotiations, in mid-February 2008, Champ Car authorized bankruptcy to facilitate a February 22 agreement in principle to merge with the IRL. The IRL purchased the CCWS's sanctioning contracts, the Champ Car Mobile Medical Unit, the series history, and goodwill for $6 million, with Forsythe and Kalkhoven signing a non-compete agreement in exchange for $2 million each.

While the first "merged" event of the IndyCar Series was the GAINSCO Auto Insurance Indy 300 from Homestead-Miami Speedway on March 29, 2008, due to a scheduling conflict with the 2008 Indy Japan 300, the 2008 Toyota Grand Prix of Long Beach was held on April 20, 2008, as a Champ Car sanctioned event using CCWS-spec Panoz-Cosworth cars and the winners getting IRL points, with the event described as a final celebration of CART/CCWS.

As of 2026, Dale Coyne Racing is the only active team in the IndyCar Series who had previously competed in the Champ Car Series in their team history.

== Television ==
Spike TV aired all races in 2004, with select races aired on high definition channel HDNet.

In 2005 and 2006, coverage was split among NBC, CBS, and Speed Channel. In 2007, coverage was split among NBC, CBS, ABC, ESPN, ESPN2, and ESPN Classic.

== Champions ==
| Season | Driver | Team | Chassis/Engine Cup | Jim Trueman Rookie of the Year |
Bridgestone Presents the Champ Car World Series Powered by Ford
| 2004 | (France) Sébastien Bourdais | Newman/Haas Racing | Lola/Cosworth–Ford | (United States) A. J. Allmendinger |
| 2005 | (France) Sébastien Bourdais | Newman/Haas Racing | Lola/Cosworth–Ford | (Germany) Timo Glock |
| 2006 | (France) Sébastien Bourdais | Newman/Haas Racing | Lola/Cosworth–Ford | (Australia) Will Power |
Champ Car World Series
| 2007 | (France) Sébastien Bourdais | Newman/Haas/Lanigan Racing | Panoz/Ford | (Netherlands) Robert Doornbos |
| 2008 | cancelled | | | |
