= Rocketsports Racing =

Racing team

Rocketsports Racing was a motor racing team based in East Lansing, Michigan in the United States.

== Team history ==
Rocketsports was founded in 1985 by racing driver Paul Gentilozzi to compete in the Trans-Am series. It competed in Trans-Am until 2004, when the championship was cancelled, and achieved 57 outright wins in 20 years. It has also raced in the IMSA sports car racing championship.

Rocketsports joined Champ Car in 2003 with driver Alex Tagliani, who scored the team's only victory at Road America in 2004. In 2005 and 2006 the team fielded cars for pay drivers and frequently changed drivers. In 2007, Tagliani returned full-time and the team shared technical information with RuSPORT. This alliance was dubbed RSPORTS, and took a race win with RuSPORT's Justin Wilson. However, the alliance ended at the end of the season. In 2008, following the unification of Champ Car and the IRL, Rocketsports announced that it would not transition to the IndyCar Series. They did compete in the Champ Car finale at Long Beach Grand Prix, with drivers Antônio Pizzonia, who competed for Rocketsports at Long Beach in 2006, and Juho Annala.

Since the demise of Champ Car, Rocketsports has competed in the revived Trans-Am Series with driver Tomy Drissi, winning the 2009 championship.

Gentilozzi went on to form RSR Racing in 2009.

== Drivers that have competed for Rocketsports in Champ Car ==
- (Finland) Juho Annala (2008)
- (Mexico) Mario Domínguez (2006)
- (Mexico) Memo Gidley (2004)
- (Germany) Timo Glock (2005)
- (United States) Ryan Hunter-Reay (2005)
- (Estonia) Tõnis Kasemets (2006)
- (United States) Michael McDowell (2005)
- (Netherlands) Nicky Pastorelli (2006)
- (France) Nelson Philippe (2004)
- (Brazil) Antônio Pizzonia (2006, 2008)
- (United Kingdom) Guy Smith (2004)
- (Canada) Alex Tagliani (2003–2004, 2007)

== Racing results ==
=== Complete CART / Champ Car World Series results ===
(key) (results in bold indicate pole position) (results in italics indicate fastest lap)

Year	Chassis	Engine	Drivers	No.	1	2	3	4	5	6	7	8	9	10	11	12	13	14	15	16	17	18	Pts Pos	Pts
2003					STP	MTY	LBH	BRH	LAU	MIL	LAG	POR	CLE	TOR	VAN	ROA	MDO	MTL	DEN	MIA	MXC	SFR		
2003	Lola B02/00	Ford XFE V8t	(Canada) Alex Tagliani	33	19	3	10	8	18	5	14	3	8	17	14	3	6	**4***	9	13	16	7	10th	97
2004					LBH	MTY	MIL	POR	CLE	TOR	VAN	ROA	DEN	MTL	LAG	LSV	SFR	MXC						
2004	Lola B02/00	Ford XFE V8t	(Canada) Alex Tagliani	8	8	5	13	7	3	7	7	1*	10	7	6	16	19	11					7th	218
2004	Lola B02/00	Ford XFE V8t	(France) Nelson Philippe	17	13	10	14	15	10														16th	89
2004	Lola B02/00	Ford XFE V8t	(United States) Memo Gidley	17						16	11												21st	15
2004	Lola B02/00	Ford XFE V8t	(United Kingdom) Guy Smith	17								10	18	16	9	17	9	17					18th	53
2005					LBH	MTY	MIL	POR	CLE	TOR	EDM	SJO	DEN	MTL	LSV	SRF	MXC							
2005	Lola B02/00	Ford XFE V8t	(Germany) Timo Glock	8	6	11	9	10	10	7	13	6	13	2	8	6	5						8th	202
2005	Lola B02/00	Ford XFE V8t	(United States) Ryan Hunter-Reay	31	13	7	17	15	18	6	16	14	6	12	10								15th	110
2005	Lola B02/00	Ford XFE V8t	(United States) Michael McDowell	31												12	11						21st	19
2006					LBH	HOU	MTY	MIL	POR	CLE	TOR	EDM	SJO	DEN	MTL	ROA	SRF	MXC						
2006	Lola B02/00	Ford XFE V8t	(Netherlands) Nicky Pastorelli	8		17	15	10	17	17		17	10	12	6								17th	73
2006	Lola B02/00	Ford XFE V8t	(Mexico) Mario Domínguez	8												12	2	17					9th	202
2006	Lola B02/00	Ford XFE V8t	(Brazil) Antônio Pizzonia	8	10																		18th	43
2006	Lola B02/00	Ford XFE V8t	(Brazil) Antônio Pizzonia	18											11		10	12					18th	43
2006	Lola B02/00	Ford XFE V8t	(Estonia) Tõnis Kasemets	18					16	12	15	11				17							19th	34
2007					LSV	LBH	HOU	POR	CLE	MTT	TOR	EDM	SJO	ROA	ZOL	ASN	SFR	MXC						
2007	Panoz DP01	Cosworth XFE V8t	(Canada) Alex Tagliani^{1}	8											9	15	7	13					10th	205

1. Competed as RSPORTS at Rds. 1–10.

=== Complete IndyCar Series results ===
(key)

Year	Chassis	Engine	Drivers	No.	1	2	3	4	5	6	7	8	9	10	11	12	13	14	15	16	17	18	19
2008					HMS	STP	MOT	LBH^{1}	KAN	INDY	MIL	TXS	IOW	RIR	WGL	NSH	MDO	EDM	KTY	SNM	DET	CHI	SRF^{2}
2008	Panoz DP01	Cosworth XFE V8t	(Brazil) Antônio Pizzonia	9				16															
2008	Panoz DP01	Cosworth XFE V8t	(Finland) Juho Annala	10				18															

1. Run to Champ Car specifications.
2. Non-points-paying, exhibition race.
