= 2007 Grand Prix of Houston =

Motor race held in Houston, Texas

(United States) 2007 Grand Prix of Houston
Race details
- Race 3 of 14 in the 2007 Champ Car World Series season
- Layout of JAGFlo Speedway at Reliant Park
- Date: April 22, 2007
- Official name: Grand Prix of Houston
- Location: JAGFlo Speedway at Reliant Park; Houston, Texas, United States
- Course: Temporary street circuit 1.683 mi / 2.709 km
- Distance: 93 laps 156.519 mi / 251.893 km
- Weather: Partly cloudy

Pole position
- Driver: Will Power (Team Australia)
- Time: 57.405

Fastest lap
- Driver: (France) Sébastien Bourdais (Newman/Haas/Lanigan Racing)
- Time: 58.018 (on lap 93 of 93)

Podium
- First: (France) Sébastien Bourdais (Newman/Haas/Lanigan Racing)
- Second: (United States) Graham Rahal (Newman/Haas/Lanigan Racing)
- Third: (Netherlands) Robert Doornbos (Minardi Team USA)

The 2007 Grand Prix of Houston was a Champ Car World Series motor race held on April 22, 2007, at the JAGFlo Speedway at Reliant Park in Houston, Texas. It was the third round of the 2007 Champ Car World Series and the sixth running of the event. Held over a set duration of 1 hour and 45 minutes, the 93-lap race was won by Newman/Haas/Lanigan Racing driver Sébastien Bourdais. His teammate Graham Rahal finished second and was the youngest driver in series history to earn a podium finish, while Robert Doornbos came in third for Minardi Team USA.

Bourdais set the fastest lap time during Saturday's qualifying session, but did not win the pole position because it was ruled that he had blocked Will Power during one of his flying laps. His lap time was resultantly negated, giving Power the pole. On the first lap of the race, however, Power fell to third place, while Bourdais gave up the lead to Justin Wilson after bypassing a chicane. Bourdais then overtook Wilson at the chicane on lap 14 and remained unchallenged until lap 68, when Tristan Gommendy, whose pit stop strategy differed from that of the leaders, assumed the top position after Bourdais made his final stop. Gommendy hoped that a caution flag would be issued to allow him to save fuel, but it ultimately never materialized, and his car ran out of fuel on lap 86. Bourdais led the rest of the way to achieve his 25th career win and his second of the season.

With his victory, Bourdais claimed the lead in the Drivers' Championship standings, while Power dropped to second place because of several incidents throughout the race which hindered his performance. This was the last Champ Car World Series race at Houston because of the series' 2008 merger with the IndyCar Series, which later played host to the event beginning in 2013.

== Background ==
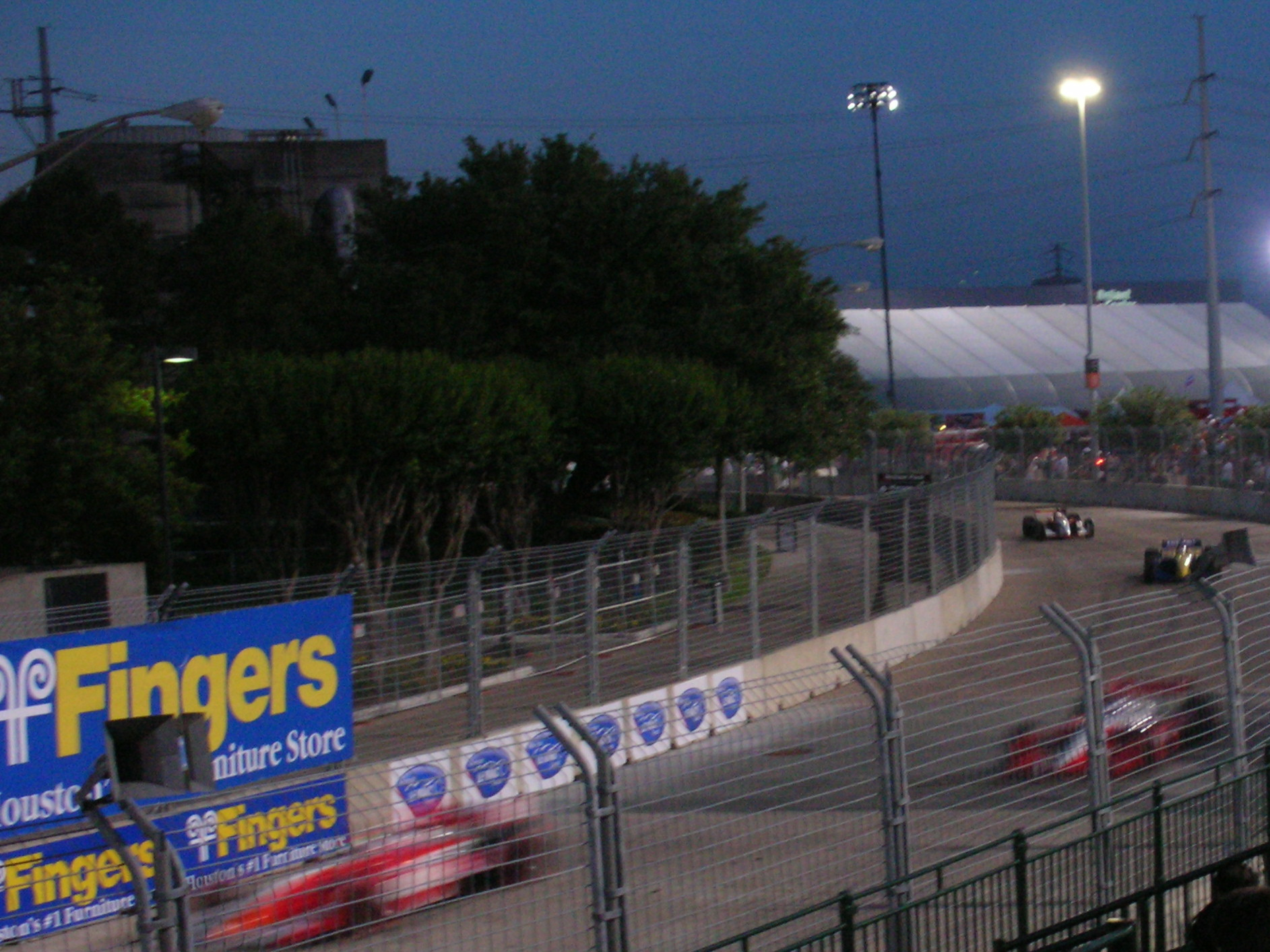
The JAGFlo Speedway at Reliant Park (pictured in 2006), where the race was held.

The 2007 Grand Prix of Houston was first confirmed to be included in the Champ Car World Series' 2007 schedule in September 2006. It was the third of 14 open-wheel races for the season, the first race outside of the Western United States, and the sixth annual edition of the event. The race was held on April 22, 2007; for the second consecutive year, it took place at the JAGFlo Speedway at Reliant Park, a 10-turn, 1.683 mi (2.709 km) street circuit, in Houston, Texas, United States. The race reverted to its original Sunday afternoon start after the 2006 event was run on Saturday night. Tire supplier Bridgestone brought two types of dry-condition tires (the more durable, black-sidewall "Primary" and the faster, red-sidewall "Alternate") and rain tires.

Heading into the race, Will Power led the Drivers' Championship with 59 points, followed by second-place Alex Tagliani with 44. Sébastien Bourdais, who was the defending race winner, trailed Power by 19 points, while Bruno Junqueira and Robert Doornbos rounded out the top-five with 36 and 35 points, respectively. After crashing out of the season-opening Vegas Grand Prix, Bourdais rebounded by winning from the pole position at the Grand Prix of Long Beach. Bourdais said that the win built momentum for the team, which he hoped to carry on to Houston. He was also unbothered by the season's first three races being held within three successive weekends: "When I was in Europe I used to race six of seven weekends in a row between the 24 Hours of Le Mans, the month of June with F3000 and the FIA GT and other races. These three races in a row are definitely bringing me back in the day."

There were 17 cars entered for the race which were fielded by 10 different teams. All cars used the Panoz DP01 chassis and Cosworth engines. One team changed drivers ahead of the race. Paul Tracy was expected to be sidelined for three months after he suffered a fractured vertebra in a practice crash at Long Beach. Though his recovery process was quicker than initially expected, Champ Car medical director Dr. Terry Trammell advised him to wait until the season's next round, the Grand Prix of Portland in June, to race again in order to avoid worsening his injury in case of another crash. In the meantime, Oriol Servià stood in for Tracy again following a second-place result at Long Beach. Tracy's teammate, Mario Domínguez, had an uncertain future with Forsythe Championship Racing, as their contract expired after the Houston race and their relationship was rumored to have soured when Domínguez crashed at Long Beach and quickly left the circuit.

A point of concern that many drivers had about the JAGFlo Speedway was its bumpy track surface. During the race weekend in 2006, numerous drivers complained that the bumps were worse than in the San Jose Street Circuit, which featured a tramway track that cars were forced to drive over during the 2005 Grand Prix of San Jose. To improve the circuit, a chicane was added in the second turn and sections of the stadium's parking lot used for the circuit were paved in concrete slabs; however, the slabs did not fit together seamlessly, causing the track to remain bumpy. Doornbos said of the JAGFlo Speedway: "I just walked a lap around the track and what also really strikes me is that there are absolutely no traces of motorsport to be seen, as if no one has ever raced here before."

== Practice and qualifying ==
=== Friday ===
Two 75-minute practice sessions were held prior to the race on Sunday, one on Friday and one on Saturday. The first session was led by Power with a 59.417-second lap; his teammate, Simon Pagenaud, came in second place, almost a tenth of a second slower. Bourdais, third-quickest, was two tenths of a second off of the Team Australia drivers' pace and was followed by RSPORTS teammates Justin Wilson and Tagliani. With 20 minutes left in the session, Servià spun on two consecutive laps at the turn-two chicane and stalled his engine the second time, which brought out the red flag. He was thus forced to sit out eight minutes of the session for causing a stoppage. The session came to an early end due to a spin by Katherine Legge.

The race's starting grid was determined by one 60-minute qualifying session on Friday and another on Saturday. As per Champ Car rules, each session was split into three segments: the first was open practice for 15 minutes, the second was a 10-minute break, and the third was open qualifications, in which drivers were allotted at least 20 minutes of track time under green-flag conditions. Each driver was required to complete no more than 15 timed laps during the session. The fastest driver(s) of each session were guaranteed to start on the grid's front row and awarded one championship point.

Tagliani was fastest in the first preliminary practice session with a time of 59.569 seconds, besting the times of Newman/Haas/Lanigan Racing drivers Bourdais and Graham Rahal, Pagenaud, and Wilson. The session was paused towards the end when a bottle of liquid was thrown onto the track, after which Legge spun and barely avoided hitting a tire barrier. Bourdais set the fastest time of Friday afternoon's qualifying session, held under sunny skies, at 58.376 seconds, beating second-place Power by over half a second. Power's best time was nullified because Champ Car officials determined that he had blocked Wilson. Rahal qualified third, ahead of Wilson and Tagliani, who both opted to save their Alternate tires for Saturday. Servià's team discovered and alleviated minor mechanical issues in his car during the morning practice session and he provisionally took sixth, with Neel Jani, Pagenaud, Junqueira, Ryan Dalziel, and Matthew Halliday occupying the next five positions.

Domínguez, in 12th, complained of a lack of grip, especially while exiting the corners. After posting laps in Primary tires, Doornbos switched to the Alternates, but struggled with oversteer and spun in the eighth turn. His best time was resultantly forfeited, dropping him to 13th. Tristan Gommendy had with a poorly-handling car, causing him to drive into a run-off area on his last lap and hindering him from qualifying higher than 14th. Dan Clarke took 15th because of the high amount of traffic ahead of him on all of his laps, starting ahead of Legge in 16th. Alex Figge was the only driver who did not qualify; his back injuries that he suffered in a crash at Long Beach had been worsened by the JAGFlo Speedway's bumpy surface, resulting in him withdrawing from the race. He was substituted by Roberto Moreno, who worked as the driver coach of Pacific Coast Motorsports since the start of the season. Andreas Wirth was also considered to replace Figge for the race, but Moreno was ultimately chosen because of his prior experience testing the DP01 chassis, despite a four-year absence from the series.

=== Saturday ===
"I think I am the kind of guy that admits when I have done something wrong and I do not think this is the case. The only reason why (Derrick) Walker (owner of Team Australia) protested is because they saw the potential that they could nail us, not because they were quicker because they were slow on that lap. It would not have changed the outcome whether I interfered on that lap, tried to or tried to get out of the way or anything. They don't care about that. It's just like a payback that goes on and on and on. If they can nail us they are just going to nail us. They protested and Champ Car ruled in their favor but the truth is the only reason they protested is because they could nail us. That lap would not have changed the outcome of qualifying."

— Sébastien Bourdais after the qualifying session on Saturday.

With a lap time of 58.224 seconds, Bourdais was the fastest driver of the final practice session on Saturday morning. Rahal, Wilson, Power, and Pagenaud were second- through fifth-quickest. Domínguez and Dalziel each caused red flags when they spun and stalled in the fourth and tenth corners, respectively. Bourdais continued showcasing a quick pace by recording the fastest time of the second preliminary practice session later that afternoon at 57.276 seconds, over six tenths of a second ahead of Power in second, followed by Rahal, Doornbos, and Gommendy. The only red flag of the session occurred because of a spin by Halliday.

During the final qualifying session, Bourdais had recorded a time of 57.242 seconds to officially take the pole position, outpacing Power by 0.163 seconds. However, Champ Car vice president of operations Tony Cotman ruled that Bourdais let by Wilson and Servià but held up Power during one of his flying laps, slowing him by 2.5 to 3 seconds. He was thus stripped of his quickest time and dropped to second place, giving Power the pole position for the third time in his career with a 57.405-second lap. Wilson started third, ahead of fourth-place Jani, who had the best qualifying result of his career, and fifth-place Servià. Rahal, sixth, felt that Power and Doornbos had ruined his last flying lap, but Cotman determined otherwise, stating that they were "well off line and out of the way."

Behind seventh-place Pagenaud and eighth-place Gommendy, Domínguez was left disappointed with his ninth-place result because he was unable to gain the grip he desired. Junqueira brought the session to an early end by spinning on-track, placing him 10th on the grid and forcing many drivers to abort their flying laps. Tagliani's quickest time was voided because he drove into a run-off area and rejoined the track directly in front of Doornbos in a manner that Cotman likened to Tracy and Tagliani's crash in the 2006 Grand Prix of San Jose. His next-best lap was still enough for him to start 11th. Minardi Team USA drivers Clarke and Doornbos, Halliday, and Pacific Coast Motorsports drivers Dalziel and Moreno started in the next five positions. Despite taking the 17th and final starting position, Legge had a positive attitude because she felt that her team fixed her car after numerous spins throughout the weekend.

=== Qualifying classification ===
Final qualifying results
Pos	No.	Driver	Team	Q1	Q2	Best	Grid
1	5	(Australia) Will Power	Team Australia	58.890	57.405	57.405	1
2	1	(France) Sébastien Bourdais	Newman/Haas/Lanigan Racing	58.376	57.653	57.653	2
3	9	(United Kingdom) Justin Wilson	RSPORTS	59.216	57.533	57.533	3
4	21	(Switzerland) Neel Jani	PKV Racing	59.354	57.753	57.753	4
5	3	(Spain) Oriol Servià	Forsythe Championship Racing	59.338	57.790	57.790	5
6	2	(United States) Graham Rahal	Newman/Haas/Lanigan Racing	58.998	57.896	57.896	6
7	15	(France) Simon Pagenaud	Team Australia	59.446	57.929	57.929	7
8	22	(France) Tristan Gommendy	PKV Racing	1:00.348	58.026	58.026	8
9	7	(Mexico) Mario Domínguez	Forsythe Championship Racing	59.788	58.079	58.079	9
10	19	(Brazil) Bruno Junqueira	Dale Coyne Racing	59.575	58.169	58.169	10
11	8	(Canada) Alex Tagliani	RSPORTS	59.269	58.198	58.198	11
12	4	(United Kingdom) Dan Clarke	Minardi Team USA	1:00.365	58.355	58.355	12
13	14	(Netherlands) Robert Doornbos	Minardi Team USA	59.940	58.569	58.569	13
14	42	(New Zealand) Matthew Halliday	Conquest Racing	59.747	58.577	58.577	14
15	28	(United Kingdom) Ryan Dalziel	Pacific Coast Motorsports	59.746	58.835	58.835	15
16	29	(Brazil) Roberto Moreno	Pacific Coast Motorsports	—	59.231	59.231	16
17	11	(United Kingdom) Katherine Legge	Dale Coyne Racing	1:00.603	59.257	59.257	17

== Warm-up ==
On Sunday, the drivers took to the track at 10:00 a.m. Central Daylight Time (UTC−05:00) for a 30-minute warm-up session to make their final preparations before the race. In spite of the controversial qualifying result on Saturday, Bourdais was again the fastest driver at 58.823 seconds; Pagenaud, Junqueira, Rahal, and Servià were in the rest of the top-five. Servià's session ended after only nine minutes because he had driven into the turn-six run-off area and his car was moved to a safe location. Legge also skidded into the area twice.

== Race ==
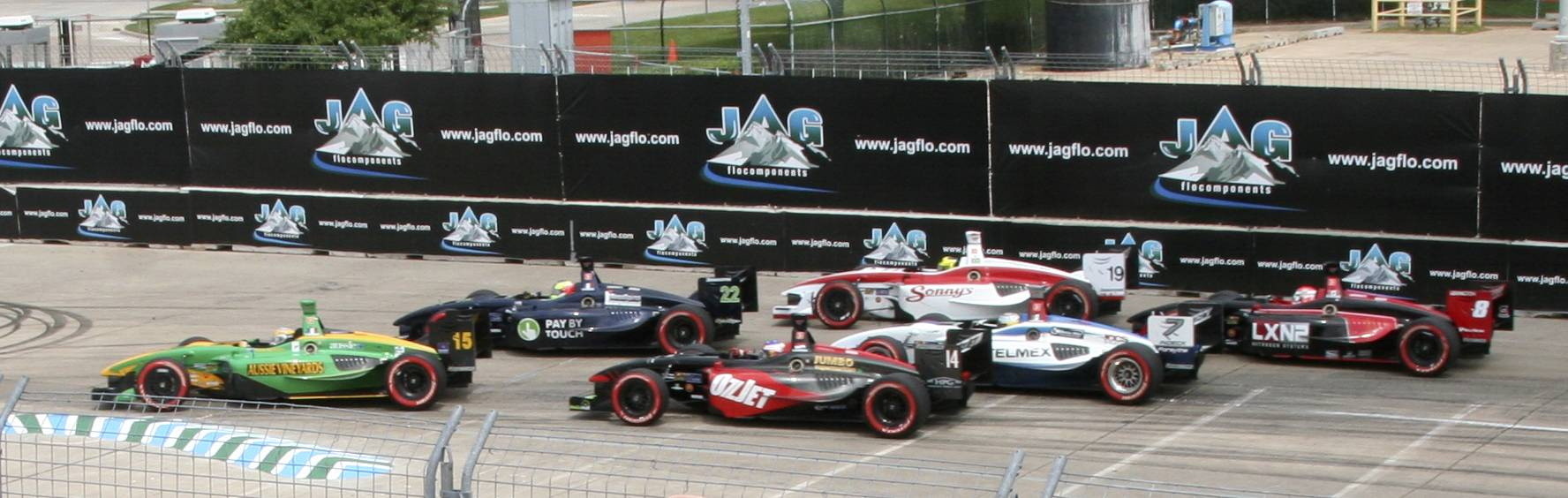
Alex Tagliani, in No. 15, leads several drivers at the start of the race.

The race began at 2:00 p.m.; as with every race in the season, it was a timed event that would end after 1 hour and 45 minutes. Weather conditions during the race were sunny, with air temperatures recorded at 79 to 81 °F (26 to 27 °C) and track temperatures at 92 to 97 °F (33 to 36 °C). The caution flag was waved on the first lap of the race because the drivers had not been aligned properly for the rolling start. On the second lap, Bourdais drove through the turn-two chicane to take the lead from Power, who then fell to third place behind Wilson. Because Bourdais had illegally cut the course, he was ordered to give up the lead to Wilson, which he eventually did on lap four. The following lap, Team Australia's issues continued as Pagenaud pulled into pit road with a punctured tire. Tagliani improved to eighth place over Junqueira on the sixth lap, and Servià out-braked Jani for fourth place in turn six five laps later.

On the 14th lap, Bourdais performed a swift out-braking overtake at the chicane to claim the lead from Wilson, while Clarke made a pit stop after hitting a wall, already his second stop of the race. Rahal moved into the top-five ahead of Jani on lap 17. Eleven laps later, the caution flag was issued for the second time when Moreno attempted to overtake Halliday at the chicane but hit his left-rear tire, causing Halliday to hit the wall. Moreno also sustained damage to his front wing and drove to pit road for repairs, but was forced to make a second stop because his team failed to remove an allen wrench from the front-right side of his nose; the blunder put Moreno a lap behind the leaders. Halliday, meanwhile, did not rejoin the race until lap 42. On lap 30, the entire field elected to pit for fuel and fresh tires, with the exception of Clarke, who pitted a lap later. Though Gommendy had attained the lead during the stops, he was given a drive-through penalty and dropped to 14th place because he previously entered pit road on the 28th lap when they were closed.

Bourdais held the lead ahead of the lap-33 restart. Servià was promoted to second because his focus on fuel-saving in the early green-flag stint allowed him to take a small batch of fuel. Rahal, Wilson, and Jani rounded out the top-five. A lap after the restart, Power got by Jani for fifth place. Legge bypassed the chicane on the 45th lap and was ordered to let Gommendy pass her as a penalty. Two laps later, Moreno stalled his engine after spinning in the eighth turn, prompting the race's third caution. Only four drivers made stops under the caution. After exiting pit road, Tagliani illegally passed Gommendy for the 12th position and fell behind him at the behest of Champ Car officials. Green-flag racing resumed on the 52nd lap, with Bourdais maintaining his lead. Power and Wilson made contact during the restart, which damaged Power's front wing and punctured one of Wilson's rear tires. As the field bunched up behind the two drivers, Legge hit Tagliani from behind and spun him around, though no caution was issued. Power and Wilson pulled into pit road the next lap.

The first cycle of green-flag pit stops began on the 61st lap when Pagenaud came in for fuel and tires, followed by Junqueira on lap 63 after spinning in the turn-six run-off area the lap prior. Second-place Servià made a stop on lap 66, but was blocked from leaving his stall by his teammate Domínguez, allowing Rahal to reel in Bourdais for the lead. On lap 69, Domínguez drove off of pit road on cold tires and collided with Power's nose in the sixth turn, while Legge, Clarke, and Jani collided into each other at the chicane; the two incidents prompted the fourth (and final) caution. Bourdais ducked into pit road moments before the caution was flown, meaning that he was not penalized. Gommendy remained on-track and inherited the lead; as per his pit strategy, his team was to keep him in the lead for the remainder of the race, hoping that another caution flag would slow the cars for at least four laps in order to conserve fuel.

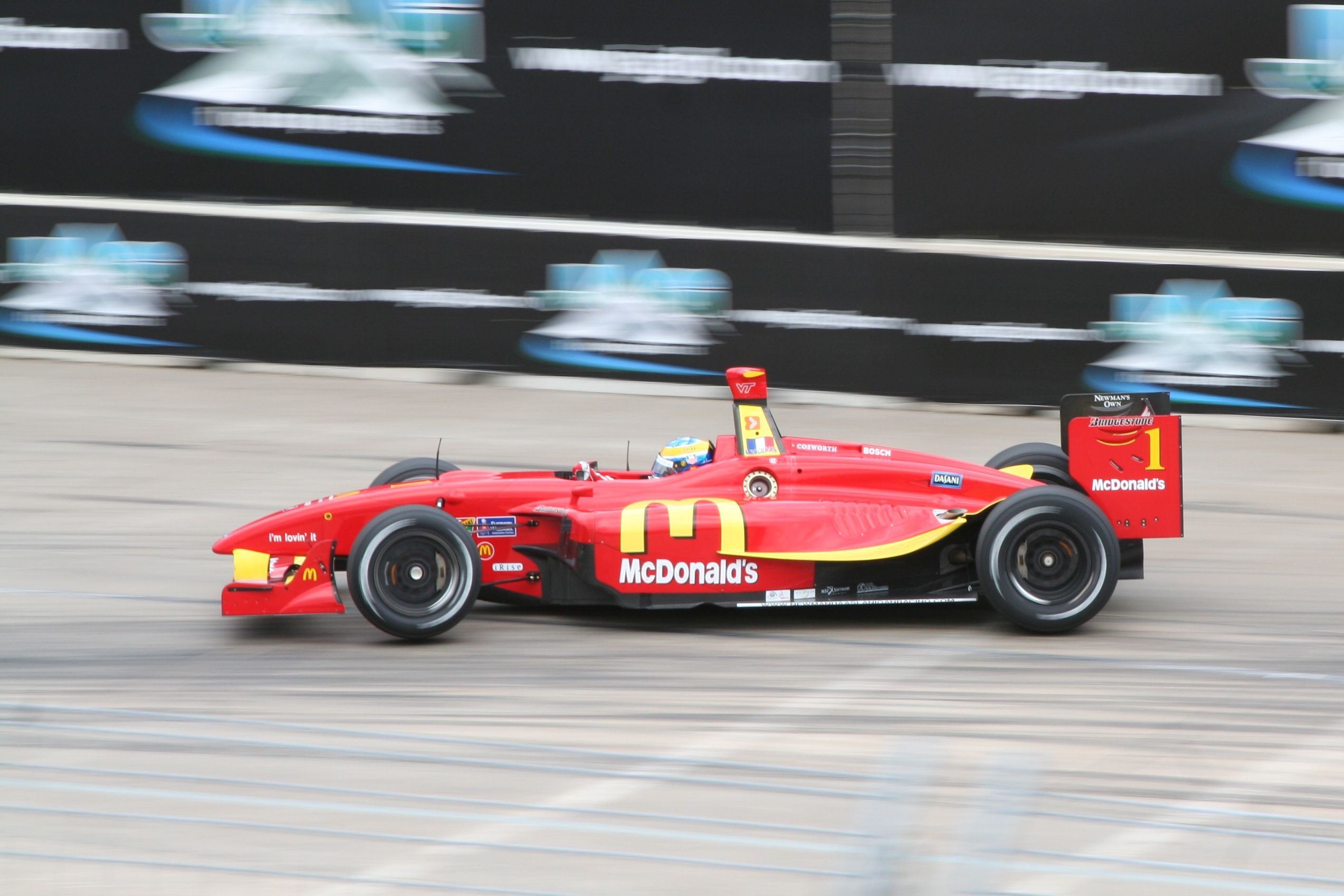
Sébastien Bourdais earned his 25th win in the Champ Car World Series and took the Drivers' Championship lead.

The top-five drivers during the restart on lap 75 were Gommendy, Bourdais, Rahal, Doornbos, and Servià. Wilson spun three laps later but continued on, so the race remained green. Bourdais, meanwhile, applied heavy pressure on Gommendy, closing to within 0.4 seconds of his lead and attempting to force him into making a mistake. On the 86th lap, eight minutes from the finish of the race, Gommendy's risky strategy finally came undone as he slowed to a halt near the entrance of pit road. Bourdais resultantly retook the lead, but not before grazing Gommendy's car with his front wing. No caution was thrown for Gommendy because officials ruled that his car was in no danger of being hit.

Bourdais held onto the lead until the time expired to take his 25th career victory. He had set the fastest lap of the race on the 93rd and final lap, timed at 58.018 seconds. His teammate Rahal finished in second place, 4.818 seconds in arrears, to become the youngest driver in series history to earn a podium finish at 18 years, three months, and 18 days old, eclipsing the previous record set by Andrew Ranger in the 2005 Grand Prix of Monterrey. It was the first one-two result for Newman/Haas/Lanigan Racing since the 2005 Hurricane Relief 400. Doornbos took third, his second podium in his first three starts, ahead of Servià in fourth and Pagenaud in fifth. Domínguez, Junqueira, Dalziel, Tagliani, and Wilson were the last drivers to finish on the lead lap. Power came in 11th, one lap behind the leaders, and Moreno was 12th, three laps down. Halliday was the final classified finisher, scored behind retiree Gommendy in 14th place, 16 laps down. The lead was traded six times between four different drivers during the course of the race. Race winner Bourdais led 62 laps, more than any other driver.

=== Post-race ===
In post-race interviews, Bourdais described the race weekend as "weird" and explained that he was saving fuel after he let Wilson take the lead: "And I kind of had the feeling that Justin (Wilson) might have been struggling a little bit to make the fuel mileage, so I just kept the pressure. And I think at some point he really, really tried to make the target, and he just, you know, couldn't keep the pace. I got a good jump out of turn 10, and got around. After that, it was a straighter shot but a pretty eventful race." He earned $75,000 for the victory. Second-place Rahal was pleased for his team and attributed his impressive performance to them after a "disappointing" qualifying session on Saturday: "We sorted out our problems, came out here today, and right away the car felt really good in the race. I was able to save a lot of fuel, keep pace with Oriol (Servià) and those guys. At the end of the day, he had to pit a lap earlier than me and that was that because I had a good in-lap and good out-lap." Doornbos was "thrilled" with his third-place result and said of his car, "I was very happy with the car, and every lap was like qualifying. I was really pushing it. My team was great, and the engineers' pit strategy played out perfectly. I'm learning about this whole 'saving fuel' strategy, and I did a better job at it today than in Vegas."

A disappointed Power said of his race: "We were on plan until our stop and were really slow on fueling and lost a few positions. After that we were saving a good amount of fuel and had the opportunity to pass a few people. Wilson was quite a bit slower than us, but I went for a move that wasn't on and that was my fault and it went downhill from there. The guys did a great job and I wish I could have brought them home a better result. Now we go back regroup and keep putting it together." Wilson agreed that Power was at fault for their collision and said that the resulting pit stop "completely messed up our strategy." Despite failing to win the race as he hoped, Gommendy still expressed pride in his team, "The car was good and it was a fantastic experience to fight with Bourdais for the lead. I did my best to hold him off. I have to thank the whole PKV Racing Team. They did a fantastic job. When we arrived here the car was not so good and we worked hard every day and we arrived at the race with a great car. It is just a shame that things didn't go our way at the end of the race."

The final race result gave Bourdais the lead in the Drivers' Championship, having amassed 73 points over the season's first three races. He held a three-point advantage over Power. Doornbos was promoted to third place and maintained the lead in the Rookie of the Year standings with 61 points, while Tagliani dropped from second to fourth with 57 points and Junqueira dropped to fifth on 53 with 11 races left in the season. Although the Grand Prix of Houston reached a total three-day attendance of 168,259 spectators, a 31% increase over the 2006 race weekend, the event was cancelled in 2008 after the Champ Car World Series was absorbed by the IndyCar Series because race officials felt that staging the event without the Champ Car World Series was economically unfeasible. The Grand Prix of Houston was eventually brought back as an IndyCar Series event in 2013.

=== Race classification ===
Final race results
Pos	No.	Driver	Team	Laps	Time/Retired	Grid	Points
1	1	(France) Sébastien Bourdais	Newman/Haas/Lanigan Racing	93	1:45:32.136	2	33^{1}^{3}
2	2	(United States) Graham Rahal	Newman/Haas/Lanigan Racing	93	+4.818	6	27
3	14	(Netherlands) Robert Doornbos	Minardi Team USA	93	+7.060	13	26^{4}
4	3	(Spain) Oriol Servià	Forsythe Championship Racing	93	+8.749	5	23
5	15	(France) Simon Pagenaud	Team Australia	93	+9.453	7	21
6	7	(Mexico) Mario Domínguez	Forsythe Championship Racing	93	+19.078	9	19
7	19	(Brazil) Bruno Junqueira	Dale Coyne Racing	93	+19.780	10	17
8	28	(United Kingdom) Ryan Dalziel	Pacific Coast Motorsports	93	+20.329	15	15
9	8	(Canada) Alex Tagliani	RSPORTS	93	+25.062	11	13
10	9	(United Kingdom) Justin Wilson	RSPORTS	93	+28.539	3	11
11	5	(Australia) Will Power	Team Australia	92	+1 Lap	1	11^{2}
12	29	(Brazil) Roberto Moreno	Pacific Coast Motorsports	90	+3 Laps	16	9
13	22	(France) Tristan Gommendy	PKV Racing	86	Mechanical	8	8
14	42	(New Zealand) Matthew Halliday	Conquest Racing	77	+16 Laps	14	7
15	21	(Switzerland) Neel Jani	PKV Racing	67	Contact	4	6
16	11	(United Kingdom) Katherine Legge	Dale Coyne Racing	67	Contact	17	5
17	4	(United Kingdom) Dan Clarke	Minardi Team USA	67	Contact	12	4

Notes

- ^1 – Includes one bonus point for being the fastest qualifier on Friday.
- ^2 – Includes one bonus point for being the fastest qualifier on Saturday.
- ^3 – Includes one bonus point for recording the fastest race lap.
- ^4 – Includes one bonus point for gaining the most positions from starting position to finishing position.

== Championship standings after the race ==
Drivers' Championship standings
+/–	Pos.	Driver	Points
2	1	(France) Sébastien Bourdais	73
1	2	(Australia) Will Power	70 (–3)
2	3	(Netherlands) Robert Doornbos	61 (–12)
2	4	(Canada) Alex Tagliani	57 (–16)
1	5	(Brazil) Bruno Junqueira	53 (–20)
Sources:

- Note: Only the top five positions are included.

Previous race: 2007 Toyota Grand Prix of Long Beach	Champ Car World Series; 2007 season	Next race: 2007 Mazda Champ Car Grand Prix of Portland
Previous race: 2006 Grand Prix of Houston	Grand Prix of Houston	Next race: 2013 Shell-Pennzoil Grand Prix of Houston (IndyCar Series event)
