= Alex Figge =

American race car driver

- Nationality: (United States) American
- Born: Alexander Figge; January 29, 1981 (age 45) Davenport, Iowa, U.S.

Pirelli World challenge career
- Debut season: 2011
- Current team: KPAX Racing
- Car number: 9
- Engine: 3.8-liter V8 twin turbo McLaren M838T
- Wins: 5
- Poles: 5
- Best finish: 1 in 2013

Previous series
- US Formula Ford; Toyota Atlantics; American Le Mans Series; Grand-Am Rolex Sports Car Series; 2007 Champ Car World Series Season; American Le Mans Series; Pirelli World Challenge

Alexander Figge (pronounced "figgy", born January 29, 1981) is an American race car driver born in Davenport, IA. He started racing professionally in the Star Mazda Championship, capturing one victory at Portland International Raceway in 2000 while driving for World Speed Motorsports.

== Career in racing ==
Figge competed in the US Formula Ford 2000 championship in 2001, running with Lightspeed Motorsports and Cape Motorsports, then moved up to the Toyota Atlantic series where he finished eighteenth (partial season), ninth, and seventh in the standings during his three year stay from 2002 to 2004.

In 2005, Figge made seven starts in the GT1 class of the American Le Mans Series where he earned one podium and six top-five finishes with teammate Ryan Dalziel. In 2005, he also made his Grand-Am Rolex Sports Car Series Daytona Prototype class debut with Dalziel, where they earned a sixth place finish in their only race of the season. In 2006, he drove a full Daytona Prototype schedule and earned three top-five finishes and finished sixteenth in driver points for Pacific Coast Motorsports, which was owned by Tyler Tedevic, Shelly Tedevic and Tom Figge.

On September 2, 2006, Pacific Coast Motorsports announced that it would enter two cars in the 2007 Champ Car World Series Season, one of which was driven by Figge with teammate Dalziel. The team struggled a bit with the new equipment and series but they were generally on race pace. Dalziel was let go from the team with two races remaining in the season. Figge's best finish was eighth place in the first race of the season at Las Vegas, which was fraught with attrition. Figge's struggles continued throughout the season, finishing towards the back of the field in most races.

=== Transition to Tafel Racing ===
With the early 2008 merger of Champ Car with the Indy Racing League, Figge left open wheel racing in the U.S and transitioned to Sports Cars by joining Tafel Racing's No. 73 Ferrari F430 team in the American Le Mans Series' GT2 class, co-driving with team owner Jim Tafel, earning two top-6 finishes.

In 2011, Figge made his Pirelli World Challenge Debut as a Volvo Factory driver, signing for a partial season with KPAX Racing alongside co driver Randy Pobst. In his three seasons with K-PAX Racing, Figge has celebrated five pole positions, five wins, and twelve top-five finishes. In February 2014, K-PAX Racing announced the return of Figge with the addition of new teammate Robert Thorne. The Pirelli World Challenge team also announced the switch from racing Volvos to McLaren MP4-12Cs in the new season.

== Motorsports Career Results ==
=== American open–wheel racing results ===
(key)

==== Star Mazda Championship ====
Year	Team	1	2	3	4	5	6	7	8	Rank	Points
1999		SEB	ATL	PPI; 14	SON; 13	POR; 34	LV; 28			N.C.	N.C.
2000	World Speed Motorsports	AMS; 23	SON; 7	MOS; 13	TEX; 7	POR; 1	ATL; 4	LAG; 32	LV; 30	7th	189

==== USF2000 National Championship ====
Year	Entrant	1	2	3	4	5	6	7	8	9	10	11	12	13	Pos	Points
2001	Lightspeed Motorsports	HMS1; 10	HMS2; 15	HMS3; 9	WGI1; 19	WGI2; 22	IRP; 10	MOH1; 23	MOH2; 27	ROA1; 12	ROA2; 11	MOH3; 11	SEB1; 6	SEB2; 15	16th	88

==== Atlantic Championship ====
Year	Team	1	2	3	4	5	6	7	8	9	10	11	12	Rank	Points
2002	World Speed Motorsports	MTY; 11	LBH; Ret	MIL; 6	LS; 13	POR; Ret	CHI; Ret	TOR; Ret	CLE; Ret	TRR; 11	ROA; 17	MTL; 10	DEN; 15	18th	30
2003	Pacific Coast Motorsports	MTY; 6	LBH; 5	MIL; 7	LS; 5	POR; 7	CLE; Ret	TOR; 8	TRR; Ret	MOH; 8	MTL; 8	DEN; Ret	MIA; 8	9th	87
2004	Pacific Coast Motorsports	LBH; Ret	MTY; 1	MIL; Ret	POR1; 6	POR2; Ret	CLE; 7	TOR; 7	VAN; 5	ROA; Ret	DEN; 8	MTL; 3	LS; 4	7th	201

==== Champ Car ====
Year	Team	No.	1	2	3	4	5	6	7	8	9	10	11	12	13	14	Rank	Points	Ref
2007	Pacific Coast Motorsports	29	LVS; 8	LBH; 16	HOU; INJ	POR; 16	CLE; 17	MTT; 13	TOR; 17	EDM; 13	SJO; 14	ROA; 13	ZOL; 14	ASN; 16	SRF; 13	MXC; 11	17th	95	

==== IndyCar Series ====
Year	Team	No.	1	2	3	4	5	6	7	8	9	10	11	12	13	14	15	16	17	18	19	Rank	Points	Ref
2008	Pacific Coast Motorsports	29	HMS	STP	MOT^{1} DNP	LBH^{1} 14	KAN	INDY	MIL	TXS	IOW	RIR	WGL	NSH	MOH	EDM	KTY	SNM	DET	CHI	SRF^{2}	43rd	0	

^{1} Run on same day.
^{2} Non-points-paying, exhibition race.
