= Pacific Coast Motorsports =

Motorsports racing team

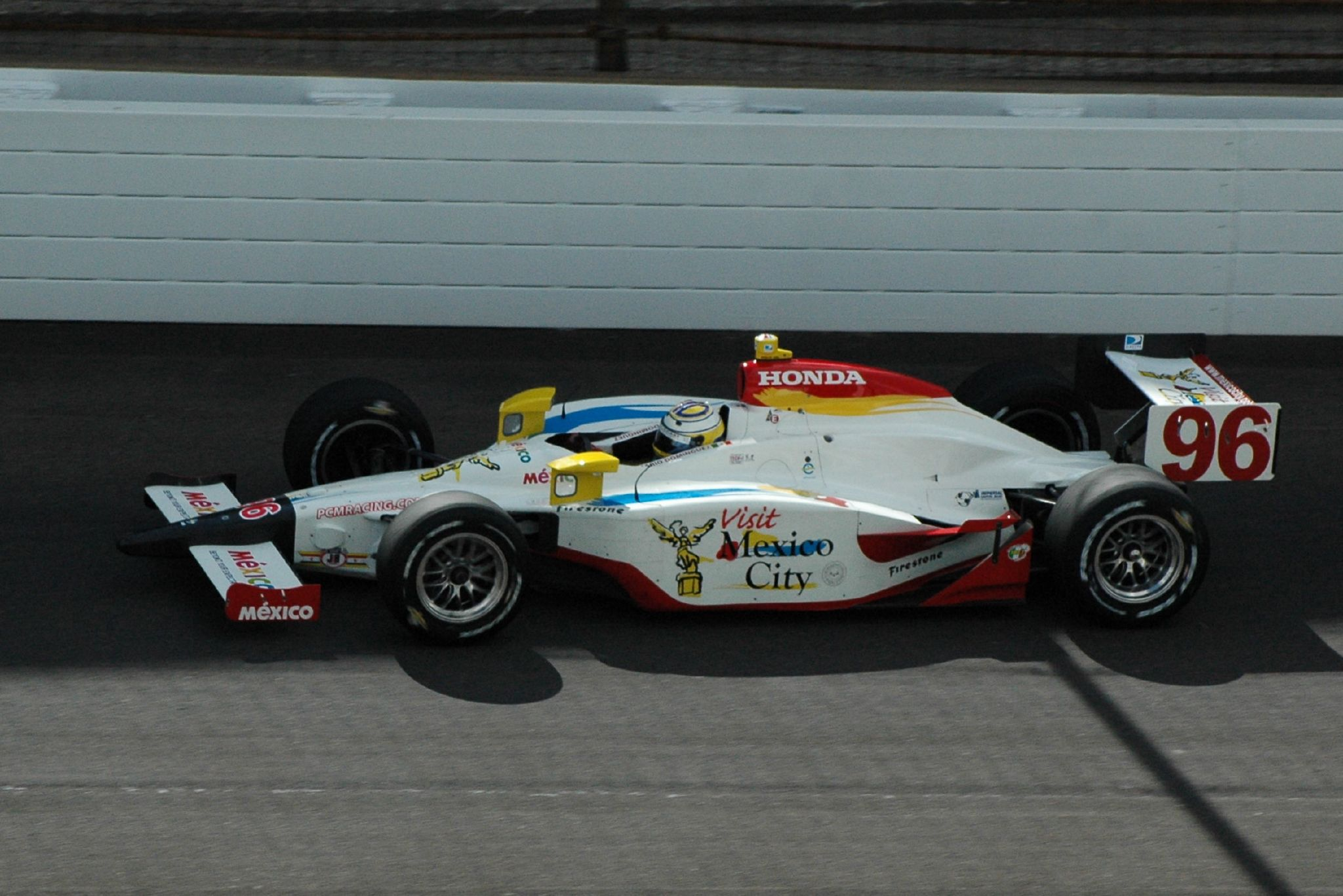
Mario Domínguez during 2008 Indianapolis 500 practice

Pacific Coast Motorsports was a racing team owned by Tyler Tadevic.

== Team history ==
It was founded by Tadevic in 2003 and has competed in the American Le Mans Series, Champ Car Atlantic Series, and Rolex Grand-Am series.

In 2007 the team moved to the Champ Car World Series, one of America's premier open-wheel racing divisions, with co-owner Tom Figge and drivers Alex Figge and Ryan Dalziel. Figge was replaced by veteran Roberto Moreno at Houston after Figge was injured at Long Beach. Dalziel was replaced by Mario Domínguez for the final two races of the season.

Due to the merging of the Champ Car series and the Indy Racing League, PCM initially announced they would not be fielding any cars in the IRL, but later rescinded the decision in another announcement, April 23, stating that an IndyCar Series team would begin competition starting with the 2008 Indianapolis 500, with Mario Domínguez as driver. It was later revealed that team manager Tyler Tadevic had purchased the team from Figge in order to complete the deal to allow the team to continue operations. Dominguez initially qualified for the 2008 Indy 500, but was "bumped" from the field by a faster car, driven by former race winner Buddy Lazier and Dominguez crashed in a last-ditch effort to requalify. The team made its IndyCar Series debut the following week at the Milwaukee Mile. After a crash at the Texas Motor Speedway race, the team elected to sit out the next two oval races to repair the car and regroup and returned to the series for the next road course race at Watkins Glen International.

In January 2009, the team confirmed a full season 2009 campaign and had reportedly merged with Rubicon Race Team, of which Tadevic was listed as a co-owner. However, the deal fell apart, Rubicon became Rubicon Sports Agency and aligned itself with Conquest Racing and Pacific Coast Motorsports filed for Chapter 7 bankruptcy on May 12. As Tadevic had taken out a second mortgage on his home to buy out Figge, the team's bankruptcy resulted in him losing his home. According to Tadevic, Dominguez's sponsors had only paid a small portion of what they had committed.

== Racing results ==
=== Complete Champ Car World Series results ===
(key)

Year	Chassis	Engine	Drivers	No.	1	2	3	4	5	6	7	8	9	10	11	12	13	14
2007					LSV	LBH	HOU	POR	CLE	MTT	TOR	EDM	SJO	ROA	ZOL	ASN	SFR	MXC
2007	Panoz DP01	Cosworth XFE V8t	(United Kingdom) Ryan Dalziel	28	11	9	8	14	9	10	7	12		17	15	10		
2007	Panoz DP01	Cosworth XFE V8t	(Mexico) Mario Domínguez	28									12				12	8
2007	Panoz DP01	Cosworth XFE V8t	(United States) Alex Figge	29	8	16		16	17	13	17	13	14	13	14	16	13	11
2007	Panoz DP01	Cosworth XFE V8t	(Brazil) Roberto Moreno	29			12											

=== Complete IRL IndyCar Series results ===
(key)

Year	Chassis	Engine	Drivers	No.	1	2	3	4	5	6	7	8	9	10	11	12	13	14	15	16	17	18	19
2008					HMS	STP	MOT	LBH^{1}	KAN	INDY	MIL	TXS	IOW	RIR	WGL	NSH	MDO	EDM	KTY	SNM	DET	CHI	SRF^{3}
2008	Panoz DP01	Cosworth XFE V8t	(United States) Alex Figge	29				14															
2008	Panoz DP01	Cosworth XFE V8t	(Mexico) Mario Domínguez	96				3															
2008	Dallara IR-05	Honda HI7R V8	(Mexico) Mario Domínguez	96						DNQ	26	21			13		19	24		16			

1. Run to Champ Car specifications.
2. Non-points-paying, exhibition race.
