= RSPORTS =

RSPORTS was an auto racing team that competed in the Champ Car World Series. It was founded officially in 2007 as a technological partnership, but started out originally as two different teams owned by former race car drivers Carl Russo, who owned RuSPORT, and Paul Gentilozzi who founded Rocketsports.

== RuSPORT ==
Carl Russo drove for the team then known as Performance Development and Racing, or PDR which was owned by Steve Wulff before Russo drove in the Toyota Atlantic Series before he gave up his seat to young driver Aaron Justus. Justus and A. J. Allmendinger were drivers in the team's 2003 Atlantic season, and Allmendinger cruised to the championship with seven victories from 11 starts.

Both RuSPORT and Allmendinger moved up to Champ Car in 2004, and added a second car at the 11th hour for Michel Jourdain Jr. to keep car count at the minimum of 18. Most of the team's resources were stretched and Jourdain and the team parted ways following the season. Justin Wilson was signed as a replacement for 2005.

The 2005 season was the team's breakout year with Wilson scoring two victories and finishing third in the championship. Allmendinger came close to victory, with four runner-up finishes during the season. For 2006 they were expected to be the top challengers to Newman/Haas Racing. Midway through the season, the team replaced Allmendinger with 2002 CART champion Cristiano da Matta who moved over to the team from Dale Coyne Racing.

Cristiano da Matta was injured in a collision with a deer during testing at Road America on August 3, 2006.

On September 17, 2006, the team announced that it would hold a "shootout" at Sebring Raceway to determine who would drive the #10 car in the final two races of the season. On October 9, it was revealed that the winner of the shootout was Australian Ryan Briscoe, who would make his first appearance for the team at his home race, the Lexmark Indy 300.

== Rocketsports ==
Rocketsports Racing is a motor racing team from the United States based in East Lansing, Michigan. It competes in the Champ Car World Series and the Grand-Am Rolex Sports Car Series Series in the Daytona Prototype class.

Rocketsports was founded in 1985 by racing driver Paul Gentilozzi to compete in the Trans-Am series. It competed in Trans-Am until 2004, when the championship was cancelled, and achieved 57 outright wins in 20 years. It has also raced in the IMSA sports car racing championship.

Rocketsports joined Champ Car in 2003 and has often fielded cars for pay drivers and frequently changes drivers.

== Merge and disassemble ==
Towards the end of the 2006 season, Russo announced that he would be bringing his company public, a move that required that he divest himself of his sometimes unprofitable motorsports interests. It was unclear what would happen to the team until it was announced on November 28 that PKV Racing co-owner Dan Pettit had purchased the team from Russo.

On January 22, 2007, RuSPORT confirmed the return of Justin Wilson and title sponsor, CDW. They reportedly signed Wilson to a multi-year contract. Along with Wilson's return, RuSport announced that they would form a technological partnership with Rocketsports, to be known as RSPORTS. This would involve the signing of Alex Tagliani to the team's #8 machine. However, success came in the form of the team's only 2007 victory with Wilson in Assen. Nearing the end of the 2007 season, Petit and Gentilozzi announced that they would be splitting their operations for 2008, but Petit would partner with Gerry Forsythe to form Forsythe/Pettit Racing.

== Past Drivers ==
- (Canada) Alex Tagliani (2007)
- (United Kingdom) Justin Wilson (2007)

== Racing results ==
=== Complete Champ Car World Series results ===
(key)

Year	Chassis	Engine	Drivers	No.	1	2	3	4	5	6	7	8	9	10	11	12	13	14
2007					LSV	LBH	HOU	POR	CLE	MTT	TOR	EDM	SJO	ROA	ZOL	ASN	SFR	MXC
2007	Panoz DP01	Cosworth XFE V8t	(Canada) Alex Tagliani	8	4	5	9	5	6	8	8	14	15	5				
2007	Panoz DP01	Cosworth XFE V8t	(United Kingdom) Justin Wilson	9	14	4	10	2*	4	5	3	2	13	8				
