= Dan Clarke =

British open-wheel racing driver

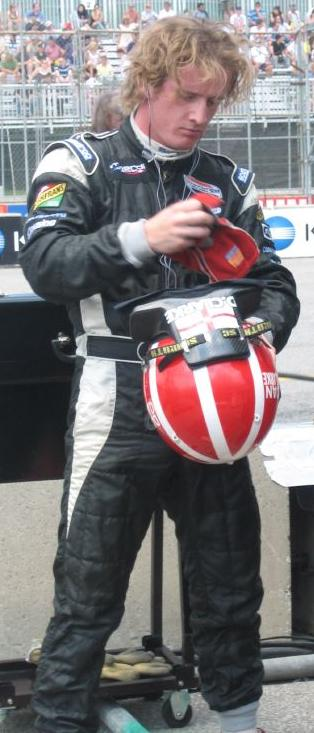
- Clarke in 2007
- Nationality: British
- Born: 4 October 1983 (age 43) Mexborough, South Yorkshire, England
- Categorisation: FIA Silver
- Achievements: 2004 Formula Ford Festival Winner

Champ Car career
- 27 races run over 2 years
- Years active: 2006–2007
- Team(s): CTE Racing-HVM (2006); Minardi Team USA (2007)
- Best finish: 12th – 2006
- First race: 2006 Grand Prix of Long Beach (Long Beach)
- Last race: 2007 Gran Premio Tecate (Mexico City)
Wins	Podiums	Poles
0	2	1

NASCAR O'Reilly Auto Parts Series career
- 1 race run over 1 year
- 2011 position: 87th
- Best finish: 87th (2011)
- First race: 2011 Zippo 200 (Watkins Glen)
Wins	Top tens	Poles
0	0	0
- Statistics up to date as of 29 May 2012.

Previous series
- 2010 2009 2007 2006 2005 2004 2003 2002 2001: Firestone Indy Lights; A1 Grand Prix; Champ Car World Series; Champ Car World Series; British F3; UK Formula Ford; UK Formula Ford; UK FFord Jnr; BRDC FFord

Daniel Clarke (born 4 October 1983) is a British auto racing driver, most recently competing in the Firestone Indy Lights series with Walker Racing, having previously competed in the A1GP World Cup of Motorsport and the Champ Car World Series.

== Early career ==
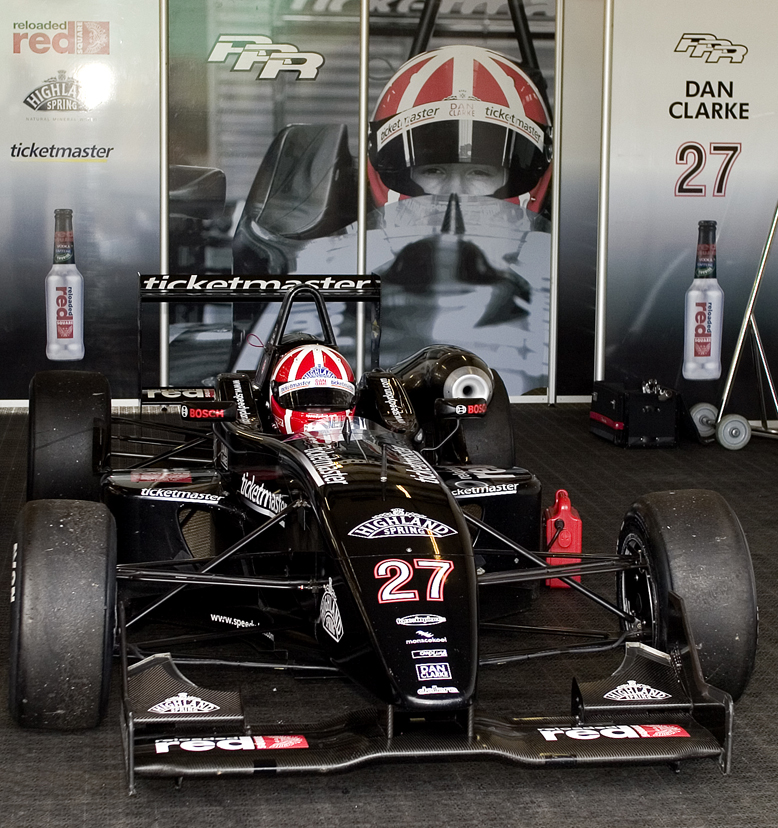
Dan Clarke in his Räikkönen Robertson Racing F3 at Silverstone, 9 October 2005

A veteran of British Formula Ford where he won the Formula Ford Festival in 2004, Clarke moved up the British Formula 3 Championship in 2005 in a team part-owned by Kimi Räikkönen of Räikkönen Robertson Racing. Clarke finished fifth overall, taking the team's first win at Castle Combe and setting the circuit outright lap record, which he still holds.

== 2006 and 2007 ==
After a series of tests, Clarke was signed to drive in the Champ Car World Series for CTE Racing-HVM, in 2006 as a teammate to Nelson Philippe. The team owned jointly by Cedric the Entertainer and Keith Wiggins.

Clarke finished sixth at Portland International Raceway and seventh at Burke Lakefront Airport, where he was battling for second with Mario Domínguez when they collided on the penultimate lap. Clarke also competed at San Jose, moving up from ninth to second before a gearbox failure put him out at mid-distance. In his next race, in Denver, Clarke moved into third-place on the final lap because of a collision of two drivers ahead of him to achieve his first podium finish as a Champ Car driver. The Denver third-place was the first podium finish for a Champ Car Rookie driver in the 2006 racing season.

Following on from Denver, Clarke continued to run at the front and narrowly missed out on another podium finish at the next race in Montreal, coming home in fourth-place. Immediately after, Clarke won the Bridgestone Pole Position award at Road America, Wisconsin. He was the first rookie to do so since 2003 and the first British Rookie since Nigel Mansell in 1993. Clarke experienced misfortune towards the end of the season, which saw him forced to settle for "Rookie runner-up" to Will Power after an intense battle between the two drivers.

Clarke returned to the team for the 2007 season, now named Minardi Team USA, joined by new teammate and former Minardi and Red Bull Racing F1 driver Robert Doornbos. Clarke had a troubled season, finishing 13th in the overall standings and missing one race. He missed the race at Zolder, having been ejected from the event for causing a multi-car crash in practice. He did, however, record a second-place at Road America.

Upon the folding of the Champ Car series into the IndyCar Series, the Minardi team became known as HVM Racing and hired E. J. Viso to drive, leaving Clarke without a team.

== 2009 ==
Clarke drove for Great Britain in the A1GP series, participating in three rounds of the fourth season of the championship.

First announced as the Team GBR driver halfway into the 2008/2009 series at Taupo, New Zealand, Clarke had little time to adapt to the new car, team and track. He went on to build experience through that weekend and then at the Portimão, Portugal, races. The next race for Clarke was Brands Hatch, UK, in front of his home fans. Despite qualifying technical issues, Clarke put on an impressive performance to drive back from fourteenth-place in the feature to seventh, scoring the fastest race laps in the process.

However, for the second time in his career, the series he was in folded in the off-season, leaving Clarke without a team.

== 2010 ==
In 2010, Clarke signed on with Walker Racing in the Firestone Indy Lights series, the top feeder series to IndyCar. He joined the team for the second race of the season at Barber Motorsports Park. Clarke finished seventh in points with a pair of second-place finishes at Toronto and Mid-Ohio. After a slow start learning the car and working with the team, Dan scored a fourth place finish in his first outing at the Indianapolis Motor Speedway Freedom 100 and then went on to a successful second half of the season with two second-place finishes at Toronto and Mid-Ohio, five top-fives and seven top-tenss. He finished up seventh in the series points.

== 2011 ==
In 2011, Clarke competed in a NASCAR Nationwide Series race at Watkins Glen International, finishing 39th following an engine failure.

== 2023 ==
Clarke returned to professional racing in 2023, taking part in the Porsche Carrera Cup North America for the Nolasport team.

== Motorsports career results ==
=== American open-wheel racing results ===
(key)

==== Champ Car ====
Year	Team	No.	1	2	3	4	5	6	7	8	9	10	11	12	13	14	Rank	Points	Ref
2006	CTE-HVM Racing	14	LBH; 11	HOU; 16	MTY; 13	MIL; 8	POR; 6	CLE; 7	TOR; 17	EDM; 9	SJO; 16	DEN; 3	MTL; 4	**ROA**; **6**	SRF; 17	MXC; 18	**12th**	**175**	
2007	Minardi Team USA	4	LVS; 15	LBH; 12	HOU; 17	POR; 6	CLE; 11	MTT; 14	TOR; 12	EDM; 8	SJO; 17	ROA; 2	ZOL; Wth	ASN; 11	SRF; 17	MXC; 17	**13th**	**129**	

==== Indy Lights ====
Year	Team	1	2	3	4	5	6	7	8	9	10	11	12	13	Rank	Points	Ref
2010	Walker Racing	STP	ALA; 7	LBH; 13	INDY; 4	IOW; 9	WGL; 13	TOR; 2	EDM; 5	MOH; 2	SNM; 13	CHI; 5	KTY; 10	HMS; 17	**7th**	**304**	

=== Complete A1 Grand Prix results ===
(key) (Races in bold indicate pole position) (Races in italics indicate fastest lap)

Year	Entrant	1	2	3	4	5	6	7	8	9	10	11	12	13	14	DC	Points	Ref
2008–09	Great Britain	NED; SPR	NED; FEA	CHN; SPR	CHN; FEA	MYS; SPR	MYS; FEA	NZL; SPR; 12	NZL; FEA; 12	RSA; SPR	RSA; FEA	POR; SPR; 11	POR; FEA; 7	GBR; SPR; 13	GBR; SPR; 7	10th	28	

=== NASCAR ===
(key) (Bold – Pole position awarded by qualifying time. Italics – Pole position earned by points standings or practice time. * – Most laps led.)

==== Nationwide Series ====
NASCAR Nationwide Series results
Year	Team	No.	Make	1	2	3	4	5	6	7	8	9	10	11	12	13	14	15	16	17	18	19	20	21	22	23	24	25	26	27	28	29	30	31	32	33	34	NNSC	Pts	Ref
2011	Means Motorsports	52	Chevy	DAY	PHO	LVS	BRI	CAL	TEX	TAL	NSH	RCH	DAR	DOV	IOW	CLT	CHI	MCH	ROA	DAY	KEN	NHA	NSH	IRP	IOW	GLN; 39	CGV	BRI	ATL	RCH	CHI	DOV	KAN	CLT	TEX	PHO	HOM	87th	5	

Sporting positions
Preceded by Joey Foster	Formula Ford Festival Winner; 2004	Succeeded by Duncan Tappy
