= 2007 Belgian Champ Car Grand Prix =

(Belgium) 2007 Belgian Champ Car Grand Prix
Race details
- Race 11 of 14 in the 2007 Champ Car season
- Zolder Track Layout
- Date: August 26, 2007
- Official name: Belgian Champ Car Grand Prix
- Location: Circuit Zolder, Heusden-Zolder, Belgium
- Course: Permanent Road Course; 2.492 mi / 4.010 km
- Distance: 71 laps 176.932 mi / 284.744 km
- Weather: Cloudy

Pole position
- Driver: (France) Sébastien Bourdais (N/H/L Racing)
- Time: 1:12.821

Fastest lap
- Driver: (France) Sébastien Bourdais (N/H/L Racing)
- Time: 1:14.089 (on lap 39 of 71)

Podium
- First: (France) Sébastien Bourdais (N/H/L Racing)
- Second: (Brazil) Bruno Junqueira (Dale Coyne Racing)
- Third: (United States) Graham Rahal (N/H/L Racing)

The 2007 Belgian Champ Car Grand Prix was the eleventh round of the 2007 season of the Champ Car World Series. It was held on August 26, 2007, at Circuit Zolder in Heusden-Zolder, Belgium. The race was won by Sébastien Bourdais, and it was his sixth victory of the season.

== Background ==
The race was part of a short tour through Europe, with the race at TT Circuit Assen in The Netherlands one week later. It was the series' first and last ever race in Belgium. On January 16, 2007, the Champ Car World Series announced a multi-year agreement that would see the return of Champ Car to Europe for the first time since 2003 with inaugural races in the Netherlands and Belgium. It was the first time that Champ Car has raced in either of the two European nations. "We are excited to bring the American equivalent of Formula 1 racing to Europe," said event promoter Bart Rietbergen. "Champ Car provides close racing that is easy for European fans to understand, and they will be very impressed with the access that they will have in the Champ Car paddock."

Conquest Racing driver Jan Heylen found himself in a home race on the circuit that lies just 30 km (19 mi) from Geel, the place where he was born. Next to Heylen, Robert Doornbos also had many fans as the track lies close to his native country, the Netherlands.

== Qualifying results ==
| Pos | Nat | Name | Team | Qual 1 | Qual 2 | Best |
|---|---|---|---|---|---|---|
| 1 | (France) | Sébastien Bourdais | N/H/L Racing | 1:14.023 | 1:12.821 | 1:12.821 |
| 2 | (Australia) | Will Power | Team Australia | 1:13.810 | 1:13.194 | 1:13.194 |
| 3 | (Netherlands) | Robert Doornbos | Minardi Team USA | no time | 1:13.067 | 1:13.067 |
| 4 | (Brazil) | Bruno Junqueira | Dale Coyne Racing | 1:14.433 | 1:13.313 | 1:13.313 |
| 5 | (United Kingdom) | Justin Wilson | RSPORTS | 1:15.041 | 1:13.327 | 1:13.327 |
| 6 | (Canada) | Alex Tagliani | RSPORTS | 1:14.960 | 1:13.384 | 1:13.384 |
| 7 | (Canada) | Paul Tracy | Forsythe Racing | 1:14.829 | 1:13.407 | 1:13.407 |
| 8 | (France) | Simon Pagenaud | Team Australia | 1:14.030 | 1:13.436 | 1:13.436 |
| 9 | (Switzerland) | Neel Jani | PKV Racing | 1:14.823 | 1:13.555 | 1:13.436 |
| 10 | (Spain) | Oriol Servià | Forsythe Racing | 1:14.812 | 1:13.720 | 1:13.720 |
| 11 | (Belgium) | Jan Heylen | Conquest Racing | no time | 1:13.768 | 1:13.768 |
| 12 | (Mexico) | Mario Domínguez | Minardi Team USA | - | 1:13.810 | 1:13.810 |
| 13 | (United States) | Graham Rahal | N/H/L Racing | 1:14.224 | 1:13.822 | 1:13.822 |
| 14 | (United Kingdom) | Katherine Legge | Dale Coyne Racing | 1:15.603 | 1:13.987 | 1:13.987 |
| 15 | (France) | Tristan Gommendy | PKV Racing | 1:14.590 | 1:13.995 | 1:13.995 |
| 16 | (United Kingdom) | Ryan Dalziel | Pacific Coast Motorsports | 1:15.498 | 1:14.002 | 1:14.002 |
| 17 | (United States) | Alex Figge | Pacific Coast Motorsports | 1:15.934 | 1:14.744 | 1:14.744 |

Team Minardi USA driver Dan Clarke was suspended by Champ Car race director Tony Cotman for reckless driving and avoidable contact at the start of Friday's first free practice session, and thus did not participate for the remainder of the weekend. Clarke had been placed on probation after an incident with Justin Wilson at the San Jose Grand Prix. Caught up in the incident were Wilson and Belgian driver Jan Heylen. Severe damage to Heylen's car prevented him from taking part in Friday's qualifying session. Mario Domínguez replaced Clarke starting on Saturday, stepping into his fourth team for the year. Clarke's suspension would be reevaluated before the next week's Grand Prix of the Netherlands. Clarke's Team Minardi teammate Robert Doornbos was also unable to take part in Friday's session after blowing an engine at the end of the practice session immediately prior to qualifying.

Sébastien Bourdais was quickest on Saturday to win his fourth pole position of the season. It was also the fourth time Bourdais and Friday's fastest driver, Will Power, shared the front row. Doornbos recovered from his engine troubles on Friday to finish second fastest in the session, but started on the second row. Next to him was Dale Coyne Racing's Bruno Junqueira, who gave the long-struggling team its highest grid position since the 1999 Grand Prix of Long Beach.

== Race ==
| Pos | Nat | Name | Team | Laps | Time/Retired | Grid | Points |
|---|---|---|---|---|---|---|---|
| 1 | (France) | Sébastien Bourdais | N/H/L Racing | 71 | 1:45:21.997 | 1 | 33 |
| 2 | (Brazil) | Bruno Junqueira | Dale Coyne Racing | 71 | +13.7 secs | 4 | 27 |
| 3 | (United States) | Graham Rahal | N/H/L Racing | 71 | +14.5 secs | 13 | 26 |
| 4 | (Australia) | Will Power | Team Australia | 71 | +15.1 secs | 2 | 24 |
| 5 | (United Kingdom) | Justin Wilson | RSPORTS | 71 | +16.0 secs | 5 | 21 |
| 6 | (Spain) | Oriol Servià | Forsythe Racing | 71 | +17.2 secs | 10 | 19 |
| 7 | (Netherlands) | Robert Doornbos | Minardi Team USA | 71 | +18.4 secs | 3 | 17 |
| 8 | (Switzerland) | Neel Jani | PKV Racing | 71 | +19.1 secs | 9 | 15 |
| 9 | (Canada) | Alex Tagliani | RSPORTS | 71 | +23.8 secs | 6 | 13 |
| 10 | (Canada) | Paul Tracy | Forsythe Racing | 71 | +24.5 secs | 7 | 11 |
| 11 | (United Kingdom) | Katherine Legge | Dale Coyne Racing | 71 | +28.8 secs | 14 | 10 |
| 12 | (France) | Simon Pagenaud | Team Australia | 71 | +33.2 secs | 8 | 9 |
| 13 | (Belgium) | Jan Heylen | Conquest Racing | 71 | +1:12.1 | 11 | 8 |
| 14 | (United States) | Alex Figge | Pacific Coast Motorsports | 70 | + 1 Lap | 17 | 7 |
| 15 | (United Kingdom) | Ryan Dalziel | Pacific Coast Motorsports | 67 | + 4 Laps | 16 | 6 |
| 16 | (France) | Tristan Gommendy | PKV Racing | 60 | Mechanical | 15 | 5 |
| 17 | (Mexico) | Mario Domínguez | Minardi Team USA | 47 | Tyre | 12 | 4 |

In the last thirty laps, Bourdais led away from the starting grid and held the lead until his second pit stop lap 40. On that lap, Bourdais lost the lead to a pack of alternate strategy cars who had pitted for the second time during a caution period on lap 27. Included in this pack were his teammate Graham Rahal who took the lead until he ducked into the pits on lap 47, relinquishing the lead to Bourdais.

On lap 50, a caution came out. Most drivers pitted a final pitstop but four drivers stayed out: Bruno Junqueira, Simon Pagenaud, local driver Jan Heylen, and Tristan Gommendy. Of the four drivers, Junqueira's gambit was the most dangerous to Bourdais, as he had stopped on lap 49. In order for the other drivers to catch up, they had to perform a number of full course caution laps.

When the green flag came out again, the order was Pagenaud, Heylen, Gommendy, Junqueira, and Bourdais. After two hard fought laps, Junqueira gave up fourth place to Bourdais. Five laps later Gommendy gave up third spot shortly before pitting and then retiring with an oil leak.

Heylen gave up his gambit on lap 59 and while Pagenaud gamely hung on to the lead until lap 63, it was unlikely that he would make the end of the race. With that stop, Bourdais re-inherited the lead, while behind him Junqueira clung to second place while saving fuel at the same time. Rahal did not have fuel concerns but was not able to find his way around the veteran driver.

The positioning stayed the same by the end, with Bourdais in front by more than 13 seconds. Junqueira's 2nd place was Dale Coyne Racing team's best ever finish. Rahal settled for the fourth podium finish of his rookie season. Bourdais leads the season championship by 53 points over Robert Doornbos. Not an insurmountable lead, but one that leaves his challengers with an insignificant chance of preventing the capture of his fourth straight Champ Car title.

== Caution flags ==
| Laps | Cause |
|---|---|
| 16-19 | Track damage repair |
| 26-28 | Figge (29) off course |
| 49-52 | Domínguez (4) lost wheel |

== Notes ==
| Laps | Leader |
|---|---|
| 1-40 | Sébastien Bourdais |
| 41-47 | Graham Rahal |
| 48-50 | Sébastien Bourdais |
| 51-63 | Simon Pagenaud |
| 64-71 | Sébastien Bourdais |

| Driver | Laps led |
|---|---|
| Sébastien Bourdais | 51 |
| Simon Pagenaud | 13 |
| Graham Rahal | 7 |

- New Race Record Sébastien Bourdais : 1:45:21.997
- Average Speed 100.752 mph / 162.144 kmh

== Championship standings after the race ==
Drivers' Championship standings

| Pos | Driver | Points |
|---|---|---|
| 1 | (France) Sébastien Bourdais | 283 |
| 2 | (Netherlands) Robert Doornbos | 230 |
| 3 | (Australia) Will Power | 221 |
| 4 | (United Kingdom) Justin Wilson | 211 |
| 5 | (United States) Graham Rahal | 196 |

Note: Only the top five positions are included.

== Attendance ==
Attendance for the weekend at Zolder was 40,000 spectators, with 25,000 attending on race day. This was in line with the organizers expectations, and was the attendance necessary to break even financially.

| Previous race: 2007 Generac Grand Prix | Champ Car World Series; 2007 season | Next race: 2007 Bavaria Champ Car Grand Prix |
| Previous race: First Event | 2007 Belgian Champ Car Grand Prix | Next race: 2008 Champ Car Grand Prix of Belgium cancelled by IndyCar/Champ Car merger |
