= 2007 Mazda Champ Car Grand Prix of Portland =

(United States) 2007 Mazda Champ Car Grand Prix of Portland
Race details
- Race 4 of 14 in the 2007 Champ Car season
- Portland International Raceway Track Layout
- Date: June 10, 2007
- Official name: Mazda Champ Car Grand Prix of Portland Presented by Joe's Sports and Outdoor
- Location: Portland International Raceway; Portland, Oregon, United States
- Course: Permanent Road Course; 1.964 mi / 3.142 km
- Distance: 103 laps 202.292 mi / 323.626 km
- Weather: Overcast with temperatures reaching up to 68 °F (20 °C); wind speeds approaching 13 miles per hour (21 km/h)

Pole position
- Driver: (United Kingdom) Justin Wilson (RSPORTS)
- Time: 58.000

Fastest lap
- Driver: (France) Sébastien Bourdais (N/H/L Racing)
- Time: 59.331 (on lap 84 of 103)

Podium
- First: (France) Sébastien Bourdais (N/H/L Racing)
- Second: (United Kingdom) Justin Wilson (RSPORTS)
- Third: (Netherlands) Robert Doornbos (Minardi Team USA)

The 2007 Mazda Champ Car Grand Prix of Portland was the fourth round of the 2007 Champ Car World Series Season. It was held on June 10 at the Portland International Raceway, in Portland, Oregon. It featured the first standing start in Champ Car history. Sébastien Bourdais claimed the victory to make it three wins in four races this season.

== Qualifying results ==
Pos	Nat	Name	Team	Qual 1	Qual 2	Best
1	(United Kingdom)	Justin Wilson	RSPORTS	58.000	1:11.670	58.000
2	(Netherlands)	Robert Doornbos	Minardi Team USA	58.214	1:11.629	58.214
3	(France)	Sébastien Bourdais	N/H/L Racing	58.308	1:12.063	58.308
4	(Canada)	Alex Tagliani	RSPORTS	58.363	1:11.941	58.363
5	(France)	Tristan Gommendy	PKV Racing	58.399	1:12.443	58.399
6	(France)	Simon Pagenaud	Team Australia	58.448	1:12.714	58.448
7	(Australia)	Will Power	Team Australia	58.469	1:11.699	58.469
8	(United States)	Graham Rahal	N/H/L Racing	58.639	1:11.647	58.639
9	(United Kingdom)	Dan Clarke	Minardi Team USA	58.692	1:12.327	58.692
10	(Switzerland)	Neel Jani	PKV Racing	58.805	1:12.414	58.805
11	(Spain)	Oriol Servia	Forsythe Racing	58.926	1:14.039	58.926
12	(Belgium)	Jan Heylen	Conquest Racing	59.181	1:13.745	59.181
13	(Canada)	Paul Tracy	Forsythe Racing	59.418	1:12.249	59.418
14	(Brazil)	Bruno Junqueira	Dale Coyne Racing	59.696	1:12.877	59.696
15	(United States)	Alex Figge	Pacific Coast Motorsports	59.708	1:14.742	59.708
16	(United Kingdom)	Katherine Legge	Dale Coyne Racing	1:00.421	1:13.591	59.257
17	(United Kingdom)	Ryan Dalziel	Pacific Coast Motorsports	1:04.275	1:15.389	1:04.275

Rain on Saturday meant that the pole was effectively decided during the Qualification 1 session on Friday. Robert Doornbos led the wet Saturday session to start second beside Justin Wilson.

== Race ==
Pos	No	Driver	Team	Laps	Time/Retired	Grid	Points
1	1	(France) Sébastien Bourdais	N/H/L Racing	103	1:45:42.774	3	32
2	9	(United Kingdom) Justin Wilson	RSPORTS	103	+13.5 secs	1	28
3	14	(Netherlands) Robert Doornbos	Minardi Team USA	103	+35.2 secs	2	26
4	5	(Australia) Will Power	Team Australia	103	+43.3 secs	7	24
5	8	(Canada) Alex Tagliani	RSPORTS	103	+61.4 secs	4	21
6	4	(United Kingdom) Dan Clarke	Minardi Team USA	103	+62.0 secs	9	19
7	22	(France) Tristan Gommendy	PKV Racing	102	+ 1 Lap	5	17
8	15	(France) Simon Pagenaud	Team Australia	102	+ 1 Lap	6	15
9	2	(United States) Graham Rahal	N/H/L Racing	102	+ 1 Lap	8	13
10	3	(Canada) Paul Tracy	Forsythe Racing	102	+ 1 Lap	13	11
11	7	(Spain) Oriol Servia	Forsythe Racing	102	+ 1 Lap	11	10
12	21	(Switzerland) Neel Jani	PKV Racing	102	+ 1 Lap	10	9
13	19	(Brazil) Bruno Junqueira	Dale Coyne Racing	102	+ 1 Lap	14	8
14	28	(United Kingdom) Ryan Dalziel	Pacific Coast Motorsports	101	+ 2 Laps	17	7
15	34	(Belgium) Jan Heylen	Conquest Racing	100	Mechanical	12	6
16	29	(United States) Alex Figge	Pacific Coast Motorsports	100	+ 3 Laps	15	5
17	11	(United Kingdom) Katherine Legge	Dale Coyne Racing	99	Mechanical	16	4

Despite worries about stalled cars and carnage, the first standing start in Champ Car history was executed perfectly as all 17 cars got away from the grid. The race was notable for its lack of caution flags. Only two cars failed to finished, with both Katherine Legge and Jan Heylen both running into problems just before the checkered flag.

Pole sitter Justin Wilson lead easily from the start. Sébastien Bourdais was in fifth place as late as lap 25 after stretching his fuel economy. By short-filling his fuel tank during his first pit stop, Sébastien Bourdais came out on track in second place and was then able to run faster than anyone else on the track, finally passing Wilson after the second pit stop. Once in first, he easily drove away to his third consecutive victory and the 100th in Newman/Haas/Lanigan team history.

== Caution flags ==
None

== Notes ==
Laps	Leader
1-26	Justin Wilson
27	Robert Doornbos
28-29	Sébastien Bourdais
30-53	Justin Wilson
54-56	Will Power
57-79	Sébastien Bourdais
80	Justin Wilson
81-103	Sébastien Bourdais

Driver	Laps led
Sébastien Bourdais	51
Justin Wilson	48
Will Power	3
Robert Doornbos	1

== Championship standings after the race ==
Drivers' Championship standings

	Pos	Driver	Points
	1	(France) Sébastien Bourdais	105
	2	(Australia) Will Power	94
	3	(Netherlands) Robert Doornbos	87
	4	(Canada) Alex Tagliani	78
3	5	(United Kingdom) Justin Wilson	69

- Note: Only the top five positions are included.

== Attendance ==
Attendance for the 3 day race weekend was 72,211 with approximately 30,000 people on hand for the Sunday Champ Car main event. This was lower than hoped for by Champ Car and the race organizers leaving the future of the Portland race in doubt as the race's contract with Champ Car expired after the 2007 race. This was the last Champ Car race held at Portland, as the 2008 race was not absorbed into the IndyCar schedule. On October 12, 2017, it was announced that the IndyCar series will return to Portland during the 2018 Labor Day holiday weekend - Aug 31-Sept. 2, 2018.

Previous race: 2007 Grand Prix of Houston	Champ Car World Series; 2007 season	Next race: 2007 Grand Prix of Cleveland
Previous race: 2006 Grand Prix of Portland	2007 Mazda Champ Car Grand Prix of Portland	Next race: 2018 Grand Prix of Portland; IndyCar Series event
