= 2007 Toyota Grand Prix of Long Beach =

(United States) 2007 Toyota Grand Prix of Long Beach
Race details
- Race 2 of 14 in the 2007 Champ Car season
- Long Beach Track Layout
- Date: April 15, 2007
- Official name: 33rd Toyota Grand Prix of Long Beach
- Location: Long Beach Street Circuit; Long Beach, California, United States
- Course: Temporary street circuit 1.968 mi / 3.167 km
- Distance: 78 laps 153.504 mi / 247.026 km
- Weather: Sunny, some clouds

Pole position
- Driver: (France) Sébastien Bourdais (N/H/L Racing)
- Time: 1:07.546

Fastest lap
- Driver: (France) Simon Pagenaud (Team Australia)
- Time: 1:08.594 (on lap 66 of 78)

Podium
- First: (France) Sébastien Bourdais (N/H/L Racing)
- Second: (Spain) Oriol Servia (Forsythe Racing)
- Third: Will Power (Team Australia)

Chronology
Previous	Next
2006	2008

The 2007 Toyota Grand Prix of Long Beach was the second round of the 2007 Champ Car World Series Season, held on April 15 on the streets of Long Beach, California.

== Qualifying results ==
Pos	Nat	Name	Team	Qual 1	Qual 2	Best
1	(France)	Sébastien Bourdais	N/H/L Racing	1:07.970	1:07.546	1:07.546
2	(Australia)	Will Power	Team Australia	1:07.920	1:07.695	1:07.695
3	(France)	Simon Pagenaud	Team Australia	1:08.200	1:07.883	1:07.883
4	(Canada)	Alex Tagliani	RSPORTS	1:08.304	1:08.047	1:08.047
5	(United States)	Graham Rahal	N/H/L Racing	1:09.063	1:08.170	1:08.170
6	(Netherlands)	Robert Doornbos	Minardi Team USA	1:09.865	1:08.183	1:08.183
7	(United Kingdom)	Justin Wilson	RSPORTS	1:09.553	1:08.200	1:08.200
8	(Brazil)	Bruno Junqueira	Dale Coyne Racing	1:09.099	1:08.430	1:08.430
9	(France)	Tristan Gommendy	PKV Racing	1:08.823	1:08.527	1:08.527
10	(Mexico)	Mario Domínguez	Forsythe Racing	1:08.708	1:08.554	1:08.554
11	(Canada)	Paul Tracy	Forsythe Racing	1:08.573	–	1:08.573
12	(Switzerland)	Neel Jani	PKV Racing	1:09.991	1:08.609	1:08.609
13	(New Zealand)	Matt Halliday	Conquest Racing	1:10.155	1:08.864	1:08.864
14	(United Kingdom)	Dan Clarke	Minardi Team USA	1:09.773	1:08.890	1:08.890
15	(Spain)	Oriol Servia	Forsythe Racing	–	1:08.922	1:08.922
16	(United Kingdom)	Ryan Dalziel	Pacific Coast Motorsports	1:09.790	1:09.070	1:09.070
17	(United States)	Alex Figge	Pacific Coast Motorsports	1:09.585	1:09.151	1:09.151
18	(United Kingdom)	Katherine Legge	Dale Coyne Racing	1:09.766	1:10.418	1:09.766

note: Paul Tracy was injured in practice between Q1 and Q2. Oriol Servia replaced him and drove his backup car in Q2 and will drive in the race.

== Grid ==
Row	Inside		Outside	
1	1	(France) Sébastien Bourdais	5	(Australia) Will Power
2	15	(France) Simon Pagenaud	8	(Canada) Alex Tagliani
3	2	(United States) Graham Rahal	14	(Netherlands) Robert Doornbos
4	9	(United Kingdom) Justin Wilson	19	(Brazil) Bruno Junqueira
5	22	(France) Tristan Gommendy	7	(Mexico) Mario Domínguez
6	21	(Switzerland) Neel Jani	42	(New Zealand) Matt Halliday
7	4	(United Kingdom) Dan Clarke	3	(Spain) Oriol Servia
8	28	(Scotland) Ryan Dalziel	29	(United States) Alex Figge
9	11	(United Kingdom) Katherine Legge		

== Race ==
Pos	No	Driver	Team	Laps	Time/Retired	Grid	Points
1	1	(France) Sébastien Bourdais	N/H/L Racing	78	1:40:43.975	1	32
2	3	(Spain) Oriol Servia	Forsythe Racing	78	+2.6 secs	14	28
3	5	(Australia) Will Power	Team Australia	78	+3.9 secs	2	26
4	9	(United Kingdom) Justin Wilson	RSPORTS	78	+5.4 secs	7	23
5	8	(Canada) Alex Tagliani	RSPORTS	78	+6.2 secs	4	21
6	19	(Brazil) Bruno Junqueira	Dale Coyne Racing	78	+6.4 secs	8	19
7	21	(Switzerland) Neel Jani	PKV Racing	78	+7.7 secs	12	17
8	2	(United States) Graham Rahal	N/H/L Racing	78	+8.3 secs	5	15
9	28	(Scotland) Ryan Dalziel	Pacific Coast Motorsports	78	+9.0 secs	16	13
10	11	(United Kingdom) Katherine Legge	Dale Coyne Racing	78	+9.9 secs	18	11
11	22	(France) Tristan Gommendy	PKV Racing	78	+10.3 secs	9	10
12	4	(United Kingdom) Dan Clarke	Minardi Team USA	77	+ 1 Lap	14	9
13	14	(Netherlands) Robert Doornbos	Minardi Team USA	74	+ 4 Laps	6	8
14	15	(France) Simon Pagenaud	Team Australia	73	+ 5 Laps	3	8
15	42	(New Zealand) Matt Halliday	Conquest Racing	72	Mechanical	13	6
16	29	(United States) Alex Figge	Pacific Coast Motorsports	69	Contact	17	5
17	7	(Mexico) Mario Domínguez	Forsythe Racing	7	Contact	10	4

== Caution flags ==
Laps	Cause
9-11	Domínguez crash
54–57	Pagenaud crash
72–76	Figge crash

== Notes ==
Laps	Leader
1–31	Sébastien Bourdais
32–38	Oriol Servia
39–54	Sébastien Bourdais
55–67	Tristan Gommendy
68–78	Sébastien Bourdais

Driver	Laps led
Sébastien Bourdais	58
Tristan Gommendy	13
Oriol Servia	7

- New Race Record: Sébastien Bourdais: 1:40:43.975 (78 Laps)

== Championship standings after the race ==
Drivers' Championship standings

	Pos	Driver	Points
	1	(Australia) Will Power	59
2	2	(Canada) Alex Tagliani	44
10	3	(France) Sébastien Bourdais	40
3	4	(Brazil) Bruno Junqueira	36
3	5	(Netherlands) Robert Doornbos	35

- Note: Only the top five positions are included.

== Attendance ==
Attendance at the 2007 Toyota Grand Prix of Long Beach was approximately 200,000 people over the race weekend with 100,000 of those fans in attendance for the Champ Car main event. This represented a 10% increase over 2006.

Previous race: 2007 Las Vegas Grand Prix	Champ Car World Series; 2007 season	Next race: 2007 Grand Prix of Houston
Previous race: 2006 Toyota Grand Prix of Long Beach	Toyota Grand Prix of Long Beach	Next race: 2008 Toyota Grand Prix of Long Beach; IndyCar Series event
