= Champ Car Mont-Tremblant 07 =

Motor car race in Quebec, Canada

(Canada) 2007 Champ Car Mont-Tremblant
Race details
- Race 6 of 14 in the 2007 Champ Car season
- Mont-Tremblant Track Layout
- Date: July 1, 2007
- Official name: Champ Car Mont-Tremblant 07
- Location: Circuit Mont-Tremblant; Saint-Jovite, Quebec, Canada
- Course: Permanent Road Course; 2.621 mi / 4.218 km
- Distance: 62 laps 162.502 mi / 261.516 km
- Weather: Partly Cloudy, Rain

Pole position
- Driver: (France) Tristan Gommendy (PKV Racing)
- Time: 1:16.776

Fastest lap
- Driver: (France) Sébastien Bourdais (N/H/L Racing)
- Time: 1:17.327 (on lap 19 of 62)

Podium
- First: (Netherlands) Robert Doornbos (Minardi Team USA)
- Second: (France) Sébastien Bourdais (N/H/L Racing)
- Third: Will Power (Team Australia)

The Champ Car Mont-Tremblant 07 was the sixth round of the 2007 Champ Car World Series Season. It was held on July 1 at the Circuit Mont-Tremblant, in Saint-Jovite, Quebec, Canada. Robert Doornbos won his first career Champ Car race, with Sébastien Bourdais and Will Power rounding out the podium.

== Qualifying results ==
Pos	Nat	Name	Team	Qual 1	Qual 2	Best
1	(France)	Tristan Gommendy	PKV Racing	1:16.776	no time	1:16.776
2	(Australia)	Will Power	Team Australia	1:16.841	1:20.943	1:16.841
3	(France)	Sébastien Bourdais	N/H/L Racing	1:16.783	1:21.380	1:16.783
4	(United Kingdom)	Justin Wilson	RSPORTS	1:16.843	1:20.981	1:16.843
5	(Netherlands)	Robert Doornbos	Minardi Team USA	1:16.850	1:22.093	1:16.850
6	(Switzerland)	Neel Jani	PKV Racing	1:16.931	1:22.604	1:16.931
7	(France)	Simon Pagenaud	Team Australia	1:16.944	1:21.671	1:16.944
8	(Canada)	Alex Tagliani	RSPORTS	1:17.256	1:21.610	1:17.256
9	(United States)	Graham Rahal	N/H/L Racing	1:17.475	1:21.350	1:17.475
10	(United Kingdom)	Dan Clarke	Minardi Team USA	1:17.481	1:23.093	1:17.481
11	(Canada)	Paul Tracy	Forsythe Racing	1:17.629	1:22.266	1:17.629
12	(Belgium)	Jan Heylen	Conquest Racing	1:17.832	1:21.611	1:17.832
13	(United Kingdom)	Ryan Dalziel	Pacific Coast Motorsports	1:17.965	1:22.804	1:17.965
14	(Spain)	Oriol Servia	Forsythe Racing	1:17.965	1:21.579	1:17.965
15	(United States)	Alex Figge	Pacific Coast Motorsports	1:18.067	no time	1:18.067
16	(Brazil)	Bruno Junqueira	Dale Coyne Racing	1:18.127	1:21.699	1:18.127
17	(United Kingdom)	Katherine Legge	Dale Coyne Racing	1:18.989	1:26.259	1:18.989

Wet conditions on Saturday secured the first career Champ Car pole position for Tristan Gommendy, who pipped his countryman Sébastien Bourdais by .007 second on Friday. The Saturday session began with a brief rain shower. The track then dried enough to allow drivers to return to slicks but the times remained well short of Friday's. Will Power led the Saturday session to earn the front row starting spot next to Gommendy.

== Race ==
Pos	No	Driver	Team	Laps	Time/Retired	Grid	Points
1	14	(Netherlands) Robert Doornbos	Minardi Team USA	62	1:45:41.899	5	31
2	1	(France) Sébastien Bourdais	N/H/L Racing	62	+2.889	3	28
3	5	(Australia) Will Power	Team Australia	62	+7.310	2	26
4	15	(France) Simon Pagenaud	Team Australia	62	+10.563	7	23
5	9	(United Kingdom) Justin Wilson	RSPORTS	62	+11.289	4	21
6	21	(Switzerland) Neel Jani	PKV Racing	62	+12.347	6	19
7	2	(United States) Graham Rahal	N/H/L Racing	62	+12.8	9	17
8	8	(Canada) Alex Tagliani	RSPORTS	62	+13.4	8	15
9	3	(Spain) Oriol Servia	Forsythe Racing	62	+26.7	13	13
10	28	(United Kingdom) Ryan Dalziel	Pacific Coast Motorsports	62	+32.9	12	11
11	11	(United Kingdom) Katherine Legge	Dale Coyne Racing	62	+46.6	16	11
12	22	(France) Tristan Gommendy	PKV Racing	60	+ 2 Laps	1	10
13	29	(United States) Alex Figge	Pacific Coast Motorsports	56	Mechanical	14	8
14	4	(United Kingdom) Dan Clarke	Minardi Team USA	34	Mechanical	10	7
15	7	(Canada) Paul Tracy	Forsythe Racing	28	Mechanical	17*	6
16	42	(Belgium) Jan Heylen	Conquest Racing	24	Off Course	11	5
17	19	(Brazil) Bruno Junqueira	Dale Coyne Racing	5	Mechanical	15	4

* Paul Tracy qualified 11th but crashed his car in Sunday practice and started from the back of the grid in his backup car.

The race got off to a ragged start as polesitter Tristan Gommendy's car failed to fire for the formation lap. As the lights for the standing start went out three cars stalled, the first time stalls marred a standing start for Champ Car in three races. Team Australia teammates Will Power and Simon Pagenaud and Jan Heylen were left stranded on the grid. Sébastien Bourdais took advantage of the misfortune in front of him to take the early lead. It appeared as if Bourdais jumped the start, but Champ Car never assessed him a penalty. It would not be the last controversial moment in the race.

The early laps of the race were run in dry but threatening conditions. Power, Pagenaud, and Heylen were all able to rejoin the race on the lead lap, while Gommendy lost two laps while his car troubles were sorted out.

Shortly after the field finished the first round of pit stops staying on slick tires, light rain began to fall. Jan Heylen spun, bringing out a caution flag. Bourdais made an uncharacteristic mistake by sliding off the track on a slippery corner under yellow, dropping him from the lead back to 11th place.

The rain was intermittent and unpredictable, so the field continued to skate around on slick tires. Robert Doornbos and then Graham Rahal held the lead following Bourdais' error. The skies finally opened up on lap 44. Slick tires were no longer an option at this point. Rahal looked to be in position to run away with the race as the field pitted for fuel and rain tires, but his car stuck in gear during the stop and he was shuffled to the rear of the field, giving the lead over to Justin Wilson.

Wilson's British wet weather driving experience didn't seem to help him much on the treacherous track and he gave up the lead to 2006 Atlantics champion Pagenaud, who took the lead for the first time in Champ Car race. He led for five laps before an off course excursion gave the lead over to Doornbos. Bourdais was in 2nd.

Sometime during this stage of the race, Bourdais claims Doornbos blocked him and began to lobby for a penalty over his radio. Champ Car did not impose a penalty. Bourdais backed off to preserve his 2nd place and Doornbos came home to his first Champ Car victory. Power was able to get around teammate Pagenaud for the final spot on the podium.

In his post-race interview broadcast on TV and on the screens at the track, Bourdais complained about Doornbos' tactics. The crowd booed the Frenchman, who would later refuse to shake Doornbos' hand on the podium. Doornbos claimed innocence, explaining that in the wet everyone was taking odd lines looking for traction, and that he also learned his lesson about blocking from the penalty he received in the previous race at Cleveland, which likely cost him a victory.

== Caution flags ==
Laps	Cause
1-2	Power, Pagenaud, Heylen stall on start
26-28	Heylen off course
28-29	Tracy spun/stalled before restart
36-39	Figge spun/stalled
46-47	Figge spun/stalled
56-57	Figge spun/stalled

== Notes ==
Laps	Leader
1-27	Sébastien Bourdais
28-37	Robert Doornbos
38-44	Graham Rahal
45-47	Justin Wilson
48-52	Simon Pagenaud
53-62	Robert Doornbos

Driver	Laps led
Sébastien Bourdais	27
Robert Doornbos	20
Graham Rahal	7
Simon Pagenaud	5
Justin Wilson	3

- New Race Record: Robert Doornbos 1:45:41.899

== Championship standings after the race ==
Drivers' Championship standings

	Pos	Driver	Points
	1	(France) Sébastien Bourdais	145
	2	(Netherlands) Robert Doornbos	145
	3	(Australia) Will Power	131
1	4	(United Kingdom) Justin Wilson	113
1	5	(Canada) Alex Tagliani	112

- Note: Only the top five positions are included.

== Attendance ==
Attendance for the 3 day race weekend was reported to be in excess of 42,000 for the first Champ/CART/USAC race in 40 years at the circuit. This was actually 7000 more than the expected 35,000 fans over the weekend by the race organizers.

Previous race: 2007 Grand Prix of Cleveland	Champ Car World Series; 2007 season	Next race: 2007 Steelback Grand Prix
Previous race: First Event replaced Grand Prix of Montreal	Mont-Tremblant Champ Car Grand Prix	Next race: Mont-Tremblant 08 canceled by IndyCar/Champ Car merger
