= 2007 San Jose Grand Prix at Redback Raceway =

(United States) 2007 San Jose Grand Prix
Race details
- Race 9 of 14 in the 2007 Champ Car season
- Redback Raceway
- Date: July 29, 2007
- Official name: San Jose Grand Prix at Redback Raceway
- Location: Streets of San Jose; San Jose, California, United States
- Course: Redback Raceway (Temporary street course); 1.443 mi / 2.322 km
- Distance: 107 laps 154.401 mi / 248.484 km
- Weather: Sunny with temperatures reaching up to 81 °F (27 °C); wind speeds approaching 12 miles per hour (19 km/h)

Pole position
- Driver: (United Kingdom) Justin Wilson (RSPORTS)
- Time: 49.039

Fastest lap
- Driver: (United Kingdom) Justin Wilson (RSPORTS)
- Time: 49.584 (on lap 35 of 107)

Podium
- First: (Netherlands) Robert Doornbos (Minardi Team USA)
- Second: (Switzerland) Neel Jani (PKV Racing)
- Third: (Spain) Oriol Servià (Forsythe Racing)

The 2007 San Jose Grand Prix at Redback Raceway is the ninth round of the 2007 Champ Car World Series Season. It was held on July 29 at the Redback Raceway temporary street circuit, in San Jose, California.

== Qualifying results ==
Pos	Nat	Name	Team	Qual 1	Qual 2	Best
1	(United Kingdom)	Justin Wilson	RSPORTS	49.747	49.039	49.039
2	(France)	Sébastien Bourdais	N/H/L Racing	49.509	49.180	49.180
3	(United Kingdom)	Dan Clarke	Minardi Team USA	50.029	49.092	49.092
4	(Spain)	Oriol Servià	Forsythe Racing	49.936	49.106	49.106
5	(Switzerland)	Neel Jani	PKV Racing	50.631	49.151	49.151
6	(United States)	Graham Rahal	N/H/L Racing	50.217	49.178	49.178
7	(Canada)	Alex Tagliani	RSPORTS	49.852	49.183	49.183
8	(France)	Tristan Gommendy	PKV Racing	49.981	49.192	49.192
9	(France)	Simon Pagenaud	Team Australia	49.944	49.255	49.255
10	(Brazil)	Bruno Junqueira	Dale Coyne Racing	49.852	49.255	49.255
11	(Canada)	Paul Tracy	Forsythe Racing	50.079	49.270	49.270
12	(Australia)	Will Power	Team Australia	49.822	49.397	49.397
13	(Belgium)	Jan Heylen	Conquest Racing	50.110	49.410	49.410
14	(Mexico)	Mario Domínguez	Pacific Coast Motorsports	50.318	49.609	49.609
15	(Netherlands)	Robert Doornbos	Minardi Team USA	49.918	49.654	49.654
16	(United Kingdom)	Katherine Legge	Dale Coyne Racing	50.531	49.808	49.808
17	(United States)	Alex Figge	Pacific Coast Motorsports	50.606	50.083	50.083

Sébastien Bourdais lead Friday's qualification session with a late fast lap near the end of qualifying. However he faded on Saturday due to some mechanical issues with his car and Justin Wilson posted the fast lap Saturday taking the pole. By virtue of his fast lap Friday Bourdais managed to maintain second position on the grid into the race.

== Race ==
The first two editions of the San Jose Grand Prix were mostly processional affairs with little to no passing. The 2007 edition, on the other hand, proved to be a very competitive affair with the winner fighting through the field from 15th position on the starting grid. The race was reminiscent of the Cleveland race where Paul Tracy rebounded from early contact and pit stops to win the race, except this race was held on a tight street circuit and not on Cleveland's wide open airport runways. The recent introduction of a painted white line in certain corners to visually enforce Champ Car's "no blocking" rule has resulted in the unintended but happy consequence of increasing the possibility of overtaking.

The standing start went off without a hitch but trouble hit at the Turn 1 hairpin, where a logjam developed in the rear of the field. Robert Doornbos lurched into the back of Jan Heylen's car knocking off his own front wing. Meanwhile, Sébastien Bourdais made a mistake in Turn 2, allowing Justin Wilson to take the lead. Doornbos and Heylen pitted under the yellow resulting from their contact.

More trouble hit as the field was preparing to take the green flag. Second place runner Dan Clarke ran into the back of Justin Wilson's car on the Balbach straight. The rear suspension on Wilson's car was damaged, sending him to the pits. The damage was eventually repaired, but Wilson finished the race 20 laps off the leader. Clarke's day was done.

Oriol Servià took advantage of the misfortune in front of him and led until lap 34 when Neel Jani was able to pass him at Turn 1. The two drivers would continue to battle at or near the front of the race the rest of the day.

Doornbos, who had set off on an alternate strategy after his early pit stop, found himself in the lead for 12 laps after the main field made their first pit stop. Making best use of the clear track and his light fuel load, Doornbos drove a series of fast laps and only dropped to third place behind Jani and Servià after his stop on lap 54.

On lap 64 Servià made a move on Jani in Turn 1, but was unable to make the pass stick. One lap later Servià tried the same move again, and this time was able keep Jani behind him as they drove out of the hairpin.

Paul Tracy running out of fuel on the Balbach straight on lap 76 provided a timely yellow flag for Doornbos who was then able to get back into the same pit sequence as the rest of the field. A very fast stop by his Team Minardi USA crew (and a bobble by Servià's) catapulted Doornbos into the lead in front of Jani.

Jani used his final Power to Pass allotment to overtake Doornbos on the restart. Unfortunately for him, Jani was driving this final stint on the soft Bridgestone "reds", and he was soon struggling for grip. With two seconds left on his own Power to Pass allotment, Doornbos slipped past Jani on lap 95 and drove away to the victory by six seconds. Despite his bad tires Jani was able to hold off Servià for second.

== Box score ==
Pos	No	Driver	Team	Laps	Time/Retired	Grid	Points
1	14	(Netherlands) Robert Doornbos	Minardi Team USA	107	1:45:07.617	15	31
2	21	(Switzerland) Neel Jani	PKV Racing	107	+6.1 secs	5	27
3	7	(Spain) Oriol Servià	Forsythe/Pettit Racing	107	+6.9 secs	4	26
4	5	(Australia) Will Power	Team Australia	107	+7.5 secs	12	23
5	1	(France) Sébastien Bourdais	N/H/L Racing	107	+8.0 secs	2	21
6	2	(United States) Graham Rahal	N/H/L Racing	107	+9.6 secs	6	19
7	19	(Brazil) Bruno Junqueira	Dale Coyne Racing	107	+14.0 secs	10	17
8	22	(France) Tristan Gommendy	PKV Racing	107	+19.2 secs	8	15
9	42	(Belgium) Jan Heylen	Conquest Racing	107	+28.5 secs	13	13
10	15	(France) Simon Pagenaud	Team Australia	107	+48.4 secs*	9	11
11	3	(Canada) Paul Tracy	Forsythe/Pettit Racing	105	+ 2 Laps	11	10
12	28	(Mexico) Mario Domínguez	Pacific Coast Motorsports	104	+ 3 Laps	14	12
13	9	(United Kingdom) Justin Wilson	RSPORTS	87	+ 20 Laps	1	8
14	29	(United States) Alex Figge	Pacific Coast Motorsports	34	Contact	17	7
15	8	(Canada) Alex Tagliani	RSPORTS	83	Gearbox	8	6
16	11	(United Kingdom) Katherine Legge	Dale Coyne Racing	13	Crash	16	5
17	4	(United Kingdom) Dan Clarke	Minardi Team USA	3	Crash	3	4

* Pagenaud assessed 25 second time penalty for blocking.

=== Caution flags ===
Laps	Cause
1-4	Doornbos/Heylen collision in Turn 1
4-5	Wilson/Clarke collision on Balbach straight
14-17	Legge solo crash into wall turn 2 exit
76-83	Tracy out of fuel back straight
90-93	Figge contact with wall

=== Lap leader breakdown ===
Laps	Leader
1-3	Justin Wilson
4-33	Oriol Servià
34-40	Neel Jani
41-42	Alex Tagliani
43-54	Robert Doornbos
55-65	Neel Jani
66-77	Oriol Servià
78-83	Robert Doornbos
84-95	Neel Jani
95-107	Robert Doornbos

=== Total laps led ===
Driver	Laps led
Oriol Servià	42
Neel Jani	30
Robert Doornbos	30
Justin Wilson	3
Alex Tagliani	2

- New Race Record Robert Doornbos : 1:45:07.617
- Average Speed 88.123 mph

== Championship standings after the race ==
Drivers' Championship standings

	Pos	Driver	Points
	1	(France) Sébastien Bourdais	216
	2	(Netherlands) Robert Doornbos	206
	3	(Australia) Will Power	192
	4	(United Kingdom) Justin Wilson	175
2	5	(Switzerland) Neel Jani	156

- Note: Only the top five positions are included.

== Attendance ==
Attendance for the 2007 San Jose Grand Prix was approximately 120,000 over the 3 day race weekend which was comparable to the 2006 edition of the race. Paid attendance was down slightly to 81,538 over the 3 day weekend from 83,248 the year before. However Champ Car race day attendance was up year over year to approximately 43,000 people.

Previous race: 2007 Rexall Grand Prix of Edmonton	Champ Car World Series; 2007 season	Next race: 2007 Generac Grand Prix
Previous race: 2006 Canary Foundation Grand Prix of San Jose	San Jose Grand Prix	Next race: Final Event; Event replaced with Monterey Grand Prix canceled by IndyCar/Champ Car merger
