= 2007 Steelback Grand Prix =

(Canada) 2007 Steelback Grand Prix of Toronto
Race details
- Race 7 of 14 in the 2007 Champ Car season
- Exhibition Place track layout
- Date: July 8, 2007
- Official name: Steelback Grand Prix of Toronto
- Location: Exhibition Place; Toronto, Ontario, Canada
- Course: Temporary Street Course; 1.755 mi / 2.824 km
- Distance: 73 laps 128.115 mi / 206.181 km
- Weather: Rain/Overcast with temperatures reaching up to 30.9 °C (87.6 °F)

Pole position
- Driver: (France) Sébastien Bourdais (N/H/L Racing)
- Time: 58.288

Fastest lap
- Driver: (France) Sébastien Bourdais (N/H/L Racing)
- Time: 1:00.083 (on lap 34 of 73)

Podium
- First: Will Power (Team Australia)
- Second: (Switzerland) Neel Jani (PKV Racing)
- Third: (United Kingdom) Justin Wilson (RSPORTS)

The 2007 Steelback Grand Prix of Toronto was the seventh round of the 2007 Champ Car World Series Season. It was held on July 8 at Exhibition Place in Toronto, Ontario, Canada. Will Power won the race, followed by Neel Jani and Justin Wilson.

== Qualifying results ==
| Pos | Nat | Name | Team | Qual 1 | Qual 2 | Best |
|---|---|---|---|---|---|---|
| 1 | (France) | Sébastien Bourdais | N/H/L Racing | 58.783 | 58.288 | 58.288 |
| 2 | (United Kingdom) | Justin Wilson | RSPORTS | 59.099 | 58.299 | 58.299 |
| 3 | (Spain) | Oriol Servia | Forsythe Racing | 58.801 | 58.661 | 58.661 |
| 4 | (France) | Simon Pagenaud | Team Australia | 59.341 | 58.664 | 58.664 |
| 5 | (Brazil) | Bruno Junqueira | Dale Coyne Racing | 59.547 | 58.675 | 58.675 |
| 6 | (Canada) | Alex Tagliani | RSPORTS | 59.737 | 58.779 | 58.779 |
| 7 | (Australia) | Will Power | Team Australia | 1:01.040 | 58.790 | 58.790 |
| 8 | (Belgium) | Jan Heylen | Conquest Racing | 59.813 | 58.816 | 58.816 |
| 9 | (Switzerland) | Neel Jani | PKV Racing | 1:00.123 | 58.834 | 58.834 |
| 10 | (Canada) | Paul Tracy | Forsythe Racing | 59.368 | 58.882 | 58.882 |
| 11 | (United Kingdom) | Ryan Dalziel | Pacific Coast Motorsports | 59.880 | 58.912 | 58.912 |
| 12 | (Netherlands) | Robert Doornbos | Minardi Team USA | 59.132 | 59.024 | 59.024 |
| 13 | (United Kingdom) | Dan Clarke | Minardi Team USA | 59.288 | 59.263 | 59.263 |
| 14 | (France) | Tristan Gommendy | PKV Racing | 59.624 | 59.265 | 59.265 |
| 15 | (United States) | Graham Rahal | N/H/L Racing | 59.456 | 59.384 | 59.384 |
| 16 | (United Kingdom) | Katherine Legge | Dale Coyne Racing | 59.520 | 59.562 | 59.520 |
| 17 | (United States) | Alex Figge | Pacific Coast Motorsports | 1:00.880 | 59.973 | 59.973 |

Sébastien Bourdais led both the Friday and Saturday qualifying sessions to win his 28th career Champ Car pole position. On Saturday Bourdais and Justin Wilson traded the fast lap three times in the final minutes, with Wilson coming up only .011 second short at the end after he brushed the wall on his last lap.

== Race ==
| Pos | No | Driver | Team | Laps | Time/Retired | Grid | Points |
|---|---|---|---|---|---|---|---|
| 1 | 5 | (Australia) Will Power | Team Australia | 73 | 1:45:58.568 | 7 | 31 |
| 2 | 21 | (Switzerland) Neel Jani | PKV Racing | 73 | +2.972 | 9 | 28 |
| 3 | 9 | (United Kingdom) Justin Wilson | RSPORTS | 73 | +3.480 | 2 | 25 |
| 4 | 15 | (France) Simon Pagenaud | Team Australia | 73 | +5.643 | 4 | 23 |
| 5 | 19 | (Brazil) Bruno Junqueira | Dale Coyne Racing | 73 | +20.738 | 5 | 21 |
| 6 | 14 | (Netherlands) Robert Doornbos | Minardi Team USA | 72 | + 1 Lap | 12 | 19 |
| 7 | 28 | (United Kingdom) Ryan Dalziel | Pacific Coast Motorsports | 72 | + 1 Lap | 11 | 17 |
| 8 | 8 | (Canada) Alex Tagliani | RSPORTS | 71 | + 2 Laps | 6 | 15 |
| 9 | 1 | (France) Sébastien Bourdais | N/H/L Racing | 67 | Crash | 1 | 16 |
| 10 | 7 | (Spain) Oriol Servia | Forsythe Racing | 56 | Crash | 3 | 11 |
| 11 | 2 | (United States) Graham Rahal | N/H/L Racing | 52 | Crash | 15 | 10 |
| 12 | 4 | (United Kingdom) Dan Clarke | Minardi Team USA | 43 | crash | 13 | 9 |
| 13 | 34 | (Belgium) Jan Heylen | Conquest Racing | 1 | Crash | 8 | 8 |
| 14 | 3 | (Canada) Paul Tracy | Forsythe Racing | 0 | Crash | 10 | 7 |
| 15 | 22 | (France) Tristan Gommendy | PKV Racing | 0 | Crash | 14 | 6 |
| 16 | 11 | (United Kingdom) Katherine Legge | Dale Coyne Racing | 0 | Crash | 16 | 5 |
| 17 | 29 | (United States) Alex Figge | Pacific Coast Motorsports | 0 | Crash | 17 | 4 |

For the second race in a row rain had a major impact on the proceedings. The race began under cloudy skies and on a track that was still partially damp after heavy rains earlier in the day. Oriol Servia got the best start from the second row and led into the first corner. Trouble began as the cars funneled through turn 3 for the first time. Alex Tagliani contacted Simon Pagenaud, knocking the front wing off Pagenaud's car. Paul Tracy collected the wing but could not see that it remained stuck under his own front wing. Coming out of the fast turn 7 the errant wing began to interfere with Tracy's steering and he hit the outside wall. This set off a chain reaction of carnage behind him as cars behind him rounded the blind turn and were not able thread through the mess. In the end, Tracy, Katherine Legge, Alex Figge, and Tristan Gommendy all ended their races immediately, with Gommendy almost flipping up the back of Jan Heylen, catching air. Heylen was able to limp back to the pits, only to retire (his fourth consecutive retirement since returning to the series), while Graham Rahal was able to return to the race with a new front wing.

Servia held the lead until he pitted for fuel and a fresh set of slick tires on lap 34. Rain began to fall soon after. On lap 38, Ryan Dalziel and Neel Jani came out of the pits on rain tires. It turned out to be the correct decision. Servia and Tagliani tangled at the slippery turn 3 on lap 39. Both cars were able to continue but a yellow flag was brought out. Except for Dan Clarke, the rest of the field pitted for rain tires during the caution.

Dan Clarke lasted only 3 green flag laps on dry weather tires before finding the wall and ending his day. Meanwhile, Ryan Dalziel led a Champ Car race for the first time in his career. They were also the first laps in the lead for the Pacific Coast Motorsports team.

After a caution period for a spin and crash by Graham Rahal, Will Power got around Dalziel on the restart on lap 56 and took the lead which he would not relinquish for the rest of the race. Dalziel was dropped to third by Jani on the next restart on lap 62. With 3 laps to go, Dalziel's hopes for a podium were dashed when Justin Wilson bounced him into the tires as he made the pass for third place.

In the end Will Power cruised to his second career Champ Car race win. Meanwhile, Sébastien Bourdais' 9th-place finish cost him the championship lead. Entering the second half of the season a close three-way battle has developed. Robert Doornbos now leads the championship with 164 points, followed closely by Power with 162 and Bourdais with 161.

== Caution flags ==
| Laps | Cause |
|---|---|
| 1-7 | Tracy (3)/Legge (11)/Figge (29)/Gommendy (22)/Rahal (2)/Heylen (34) crash |
| 14-16 | Debris on track |
| 39-42 | Servia (7)/Tagliani (8) spin/stall |
| 45-48 | Clarke (4) crash |
| 53-56 | Rahal (2) crash |
| 58-61 | Servia (7) crash |
| 68-70 | Bourdais (1)/Doornbos (14) crash |

== Notes ==
| Laps | Leader |
|---|---|
| 1-34 | Oriol Servia |
| 35-35 | Sébastien Bourdais |
| 36-36 | Will Power |
| 37-37 | Simon Pagenaud |
| 38-38 | Alex Tagliani |
| 39-40 | Robert Doornbos |
| 41-56 | Ryan Dalziel |
| 57-73 | Will Power |

| Driver | Laps led |
|---|---|
| Oriol Servia | 34 |
| Will Power | 18 |
| Ryan Dalziel | 16 |
| Robert Doornbos | 2 |
| Simon Pagenaud | 1 |
| Alex Tagliani | 1 |
| Sébastien Bourdais | 1 |

- Fastest Lap Sébastien Bourdais: 1:00.083 (Lap 34)
- New Race Record Will Power : 1:45:58.568
- Average Speed 72.534 mph

== Championship standings after the race ==
Drivers' Championship standings

| | Pos | Driver | Points |
|---|---|---|---|
| 1 | 1 | (Netherlands) Robert Doornbos | 164 |
| 1 | 2 | (Australia) Will Power | 162 |
| 2 | 3 | (France) Sébastien Bourdais | 161 |
| | 4 | (United Kingdom) Justin Wilson | 138 |
| | 5 | (Canada) Alex Tagliani | 127 |

- Note: Only the top five positions are included.

== Attendance ==
Race attendance numbers were not released for the 2007 Steelback Grand Prix. However the race reportedly had a 12% attendance increase over the 2006 race weekend. However, the number may be released at a later date as they do exist and are currently being used in sponsor negotiations for 2008.

| Previous race: 2007 Champ Car Mont-Tremblant | Champ Car World Series; 2007 season | Next race: 2007 Rexall Grand Prix of Edmonton |
| Previous race: 2006 Molson Grand Prix of Toronto | 2007 Steelback Grand Prix of Toronto | Next race: 2009 Honda Indy Toronto; IndyCar Series event |
