= 2007 Generac Grand Prix =

(United States) 2007 Generac Grand Prix of Road America
Race details
- Race 10 of 14 in the 2007 Champ Car season
- Road America Track Layout
- Date: August 12, 2007
- Official name: Champ Car Generac Grand Prix at Road America
- Location: Road America, Elkhart Lake, Wisconsin, United States
- Course: Permanent Road Course; 4.048 mi / 6.515 km
- Distance: 53 laps 214.544 mi / 345.276 km
- Weather: Sunny, 86 F / 30 C

Pole position
- Driver: (France) Sébastien Bourdais (N/H/L Racing)
- Time: 1:41.535

Fastest lap
- Driver: (France) Sebastien Bourdais (Newman Haas Lanigan Racing)
- Time: 1:44.346 (on lap 53 of 53)

Podium
- First: (France) Sebastien Bourdais (Newman Haas Lanigan Racing)
- Second: (United Kingdom) Dan Clarke (Minardi Team USA)
- Third: (United States) Graham Rahal (R) (Newman Haas Lanigan Racing)

The 2007 Champ Car Generac Grand Prix at Road America was the tenth round of the 2007 Champ Car World Series Season. It was held on August 12 at Road America in Elkhart Lake, Wisconsin.

== Qualifying results ==
Pos	Nat	Name	Team	Qual 1	Qual 2	Best
1	(France)	Sébastien Bourdais	N/H/L Racing	1:42.385	1:41.535	1:41.535
2	(Australia)	Will Power	Team Australia	1:43.116	1:43.595	1:43.116
3	(Netherlands)	Robert Doornbos	Minardi Team USA	1:43.619	1:43.134	1:43.134
4	(United States)	Graham Rahal	N/H/L Racing	1:43.732	1:43.162	1:43.162
5	(Brazil)	Bruno Junqueira	Dale Coyne Racing	1:44.326	1:43.201	1:43.201
6	(Canada)	Alex Tagliani	RSPORTS	1:43.689	1:43.374	1:43.374
7	(Switzerland)	Neel Jani	PKV Racing	1:43.417	1:44.296	1:43.417
8	(United Kingdom)	Dan Clarke	Minardi Team USA	1:43.439	1:43.853	1:43.439
9	(Belgium)	Jan Heylen	Conquest Racing	1:44.295	1:43.523	1:43.523
10	(United Kingdom)	Justin Wilson	RSPORTS	1:43.525	1:44.050	1:43.525
11	(France)	Tristan Gommendy	PKV Racing	1:44.032	1:43.565	1:43.565
12	(France)	Simon Pagenaud	Team Australia	1:43.637	1:43.581	1:43.581
13	(United Kingdom)	Ryan Dalziel	Pacific Coast Motorsports	1:43.611	1:43.795	1:43.611
14	(Spain)	Oriol Servià	Forsythe Racing	1:43.710	no time	1:43.710
15	(United States)	Alex Figge	Pacific Coast Motorsports	1:45.432	1:44.027	1:44.027
16	(Canada)	Paul Tracy	Forsythe Racing	1:44.716	1:47.132	1:44.716
17	(United Kingdom)	Katherine Legge	Dale Coyne Racing	1:46.901	1:47.271	1:46.901

Sébastien Bourdais, fresh off signing his name to a 2008 contract with Formula 1's Scuderia Toro Rosso, dominated both qualifying sessions, finishing Saturday with a best lap a second and a half clear of his closest competitor. Will Power was best of the rest to secure the other front row starting spot next to Bourdais on Sunday.

== Race ==
After dominating qualifying, Sébastien Bourdais led away from the starting grid. Will Power, the other front row starter, dropped back with bad handling while Robert Doornbos was able to provide Bourdais a certain amount of pressure after starting third on the grid, staying within two seconds of the Frenchman.

Unfortunately for Doornbos the set of tires he switched to after his first pit stop did not prove to his liking and he began losing large chunks of time as Bourdais continued in the lead.

Meanwhile, Doornbos' teammate Dan Clarke was putting on a show. Slow away from the grid thanks to a bad clutch, Clarke took advantage of the yellow flag on the opening lap by pitting and setting off an alternate strategy. When the rest of the field pitted on lap 14, Clarke found himself in the lead and made the most of the open track in front of him and came out in second place in front of Doornbos and Graham Rahal after he emerged from his pit stop on lap 16.

With Doornbos struggling on his tires, Rahal got around Doornbos in turn 3 on lap 24. Doornbos' race then went completely wrong on the next lap as Clarke cut in front of him on the approach to turn 5. Doornbos' front wing was knocked off and his suspension was damaged. He was forced to limp back to the pits, his race ruined, though he was able to return to the fight albeit four laps down. Clarke was apologetic after the race, but Doornbos accused the Englishman of brake checking him.

Clarke got around Rahal after his second pit stop, gaining further benefit from his alternate pit stop strategy while Bourdais continued to easily lead the field. The race would finish up in that order. Surprisingly, the win was the first for Bourdais in four attempts at the scenic Wisconsin circuit. With Will Power ending up in 16th place with a broken gearbox, Doornbos' accident-marred 14th-place finish and Justin Wilson, best amongst the rest of the point challengers managing only an eighth place, Bourdais took a stranglehold on the season championship.

This race marked the final race on US soil for the Champ Car Series as a separate entity from the IndyCar Series, before the merger of the two in early 2008.

=== Box Score ===
Pos	Nat	Name	Team	Laps	Time/Retired	Grid	Points
1	(France)	Sébastien Bourdais	N/H/L Racing	53	1:40:58.596	1	34
2	(United Kingdom)	Dan Clarke	Minardi Team USA	53	+9.8 secs	8	27
3	(United States)	Graham Rahal	N/H/L Racing	53	+12.2 secs	4	25
4	(Spain)	Oriol Servià	Forsythe Racing	53	+20.9 secs	14	24
5	(Canada)	Alex Tagliani	RSPORTS	53	+50.7 secs	6	21
6	(Belgium)	Jan Heylen	Conquest Racing	53	+1:00.1	9	19
7	(France)	Tristan Gommendy	PKV Racing	53	+1:02.3	11	17
8	(United Kingdom)	Justin Wilson	RSPORTS	53	+1:03.0	10	15
9	(Brazil)	Bruno Junqueira	Dale Coyne Racing	53	+1:04.5	5	13
10	(Switzerland)	Neel Jani	PKV Racing	53	+1:13.0	7	11
11	(France)	Simon Pagenaud	Team Australia	53	+1:28.9	12	10
12	(Canada)	Paul Tracy	Forsythe Racing	53	+1:35.1	16	9
13	(United States)	Alex Figge	Pacific Coast Motorsports	52	+ 1 Lap	15	8
14	(Netherlands)	Robert Doornbos	Minardi Team USA	49	+ 4 Laps	3	7
15	(United Kingdom)	Katherine Legge	Dale Coyne Racing	36	Mechanical	17	6
16	(Australia)	Will Power	Team Australia	25	Mechanical	2	5
17	(United Kingdom)	Ryan Dalziel	Pacific Coast Motorsports	15	Collision	13	4

== Caution flags ==
Laps	Cause
1-3	Tracy (3)/Pagenaud (15)/Dalziel (28) Collision

== Notes ==
Laps	Leader
1-14	Sébastien Bourdais
15-16	Dan Clarke
17-53	Sébastien Bourdais

Driver	Laps led
Sébastien Bourdais	51
Dan Clarke	2

- New Race Record Sébastien Bourdais : 1:40:58.596
- Average Speed 127.481 mph

== Championship standings after the race ==
Drivers' Championship standings

	Pos	Driver	Points
	1	(France) Sébastien Bourdais	250
	2	(Netherlands) Robert Doornbos	213
	3	(Australia) Will Power	197
	4	(United Kingdom) Justin Wilson	190
3	5	(United States) Graham Rahal	170

- Note: Only the top five positions are included.

== Attendance ==
Attendance at the 2007 Generac Grand Prix was over 100,000 people during the 4 day race weekend. Race coordinators were pleased with this result as this was the highest attendance the race had garnered since the heyday of CART racing in the late 1980s and early 1990s.

Previous race: 2007 San Jose Grand Prix at Redback Raceway	Champ Car World Series; 2007 season	Next race: 2007 Belgian Champ Car Grand Prix
Previous race: 2006 Grand Prix of Road America	2007 Champ Car Generac Grand Prix at Road America	Next race: 2016 Kohler Grand Prix; IndyCar Series event
