= 2007 Rexall Grand Prix of Edmonton =

Coordinates: 53°34′32″N 113°31′22.5″W

(Canada) 2007 Rexall Grand Prix of Edmonton
Race details
- Race 8 of 14 in the 2007 Champ Car season
- Date: July 22, 2007
- Official name: Rexall Grand Prix of Edmonton
- Location: Rexall Speedway, Edmonton, Alberta, Canada
- Course: Temporary Airport Course; 1.973 mi / 3.175 km
- Distance: 96 laps 189.408 mi / 304.800 km
- Weather: Mostly cloudy with temperatures reaching up to 27.5 °C (81.5 °F)

Pole position
- Driver: Will Power ( Team Australia)
- Time: 58.403

Fastest lap
- Driver: (France) Sébastien Bourdais ( (United States) N/H/L Racing)
- Time: 58.653 (on lap 93 of 96)

Podium
- First: (France) Sébastien Bourdais ( (United States) N/H/L Racing)
- Second: (United Kingdom) Justin Wilson ( (United States) RSPORTS)
- Third: (United States) Graham Rahal ( (United States) N/H/L Racing)

The 2007 Rexall Grand Prix of Edmonton was the eighth round of the 2007 Champ Car World Series Season, and was held on July 22, 2007 at Rexall Speedway in Edmonton, Alberta, Canada. The race was won by Sébastien Bourdais followed by Justin Wilson and Graham Rahal.

== Qualifying results ==
Pos	Nat	Name	Team	Qual 1	Qual 2	Best
1	(Australia)	Will Power	Team Australia	59.155	58.403	58.403
2	(France)	Sébastien Bourdais	N/H/L Racing	58.709	58.596	58.596
3	(United Kingdom)	Justin Wilson	RSPORTS	59.174	58.410	58.410
4	(United States)	Graham Rahal	N/H/L Racing	59.112	58.485	58.485
5	(Switzerland)	Neel Jani (R)	PKV Racing	59.465	58.762	58.762
6	(Brazil)	Bruno Junqueira	Dale Coyne Racing	59.127	58.846	58.846
7	(France)	Simon Pagenaud (R)	Team Australia	58.974	58.868	58.868
8	(United Kingdom)	Ryan Dalziel	Pacific Coast Motorsports	1:01.055	59.256	59.256
9	(Canada)	Alex Tagliani	RSPORTS	59.483	59.549	59.483
10	(United Kingdom)	Dan Clarke	Minardi Team USA	no time	59.503	59.503
11	(Netherlands)	Robert Doornbos (R)	Minardi Team USA	59.941	59.553	59.553
12	(Belgium)	Jan Heylen	Conquest Racing	1:00.470	59.561	59.561
13	(Spain)	Oriol Servia	Forsythe Racing	59.582	59.695	59.582
14	(Canada)	Paul Tracy	Forsythe Racing	1:01.840	1:00.107	1:00.107
15	(United Kingdom)	Katherine Legge	Dale Coyne Racing	1:00.222	1:00.850	1:00.222
16	(United States)	Alex Figge (R)	Pacific Coast Motorsports	1:00.937	1:01.996	1:00.937

Will Power won his fourth career pole position by nipping Justin Wilson by .007 of a second. Power knocked the front wing off his car while going off course during his final lap, but Wilson was unable to better Power's earlier best lap. Sébastien Bourdais was only fourth fastest on Saturday but his top time from Friday secured him a front row beside his championship rival Power. Tristan Gommendy will not take part in the race after suffering a back injury when he contacted the wall in Friday's qualification session. He was replaced by Mario Domínguez, who is searching for a full-time ride in the series and was in Edmonton driving the Minardi two-seater.

== Race ==
Pos	No	Driver	Team	Laps	Time/Retired	Grid	Points
1	1	(France) Sébastien Bourdais	N/H/L Racing	96	1:45:41.953	2	33
2	9	(United Kingdom) Justin Wilson	RSPORTS	96	+3.9 secs	3	27
3	2	(United States) Graham Rahal	N/H/L Racing	96	+6.6 secs	4	25
4	15	(France) Simon Pagenaud (R)	Team Australia	96	+24.8 secs	7	23
5	3	(Canada) Paul Tracy	Forsythe Racing	96	+28.1 secs	14	22
6	7	(Spain) Oriol Servia	Forsythe Racing	96	+30.0 secs	13	19
7	19	(Brazil) Bruno Junqueira	Dale Coyne Racing	96	+30.7 secs	6	17
8	4	(United Kingdom) Dan Clarke	Minardi Team USA	96	+35.3 secs	10	15
9	21	(Switzerland) Neel Jani (R)	PKV Racing	96	+37.8 secs	5	13
10	34	(Belgium) Jan Heylen	Conquest Racing	96	+58.7 secs	12	11
11	14	(Netherlands) Robert Doornbos (R)	Minardi Team USA	95	+ 1 Lap	11	10
12	28	(United Kingdom) Ryan Dalziel	Pacific Coast Motorsports	95	+ 1 Lap	8	9
13	29	(United States) Alex Figge (R)	Pacific Coast Motorsports	95	+ 1 Lap	16	8
14	8	(Canada) Alex Tagliani	RSPORTS	69	Contact	9	7
15	5	(Australia) Will Power	Team Australia	69	Mechanical	1	7
16	11	(United Kingdom) Katherine Legge	Dale Coyne Racing	36	Mechanical	15	5
17	22	(Mexico) Mario Domínguez	PKV Racing	32	Mechanical	17	4

Going into the race Sebastien Bourdais found himself in an unusual position: third place in the season points standings behind Robert Doornbos and Will Power. Starting from second on the grid next to Power, Bourdais swept around the pole-sitter on the outside through Edmonton's wide first turn. Bourdais led the race until his first pit stop on lap 21. Bourdais was forced to wait critical seconds for Katherine Legge to enter her pit stall and lost two positions.

Power now led the race in front of Justin Wilson and Bourdais. He led until his second pit stop on lap 49. Wilson stayed out an extra lap, coming in on lap 50, but Bourdais stayed out until lap 52, which proved to be the critical strategic move of the race. Bourdais came out in the lead after his stop. Bourdais now led in front of Wilson and Graham Rahal, with Power back in fourth place.

Disaster hit Power on lap 66 when the steering rack on his Panoz broke. Meanwhile, Robert Doornbos', who spent the early stages of the race stuck deep in the field unable to improve much on his 11th place grid position, tangled with the lapped car of Alex Tagliani on lap 69. Tagliani was knocked out of the race, while Doornbos was able to continue, but a lap down.

Bourdais cruised to his fourth victory of the year, followed by Justin Wilson and teammate Graham Rahal. Even more impressive was the turnaround in the season points championship. At the end of the race Bourdais led Doornbos by 20 and Will Power by 25 in his drive for an unprecedented fourth consecutive Champ Car title.

== Caution flags ==
Laps	Cause
19-21	Debris on track
69-73	Doornbos (14)/Tagliani (8) crash

== Notes ==
Laps	Leader
1-20	Sébastien Bourdais
21-48	Will Power
49	Justin Wilson
50-96	Sébastien Bourdais

Driver	Laps led
Sébastien Bourdais	67
Will Power	28
Justin Wilson	1

- Fastest Lap Sébastien Bourdais: 58.653 (Lap 93)
- New Race Record Sébastien Bourdais : 1:45:41.953
- Average Speed 107.517 mph

== Championship standings after the race ==
Drivers' Championship standings

	Pos	Driver	Points
2	1	(France) Sébastien Bourdais	194
1	2	(Netherlands) Robert Doornbos	174
1	3	(Australia) Will Power	169
	4	(United Kingdom) Justin Wilson	165
1	5	(France) Simon Pagenaud	143

- Note: Only the top five positions are included.

== Attendance ==
Race weekend attendance was 167,152. This was down slightly from the 171,391 who attended in 2006.

Previous race: 2007 Steelback Grand Prix of Toronto	Champ Car World Series; 2007 season	Next race: 2007 San Jose Grand Prix at Redback Raceway
Previous race: 2006 West Edmonton Mall Grand Prix of Edmonton	2007 Rexall Grand Prix of Edmonton	Next race: 2008 Rexall Edmonton Indy; IndyCar Series event
