= 2007 Grand Prix of Cleveland =

Coordinates: 41°31′2.3″N 81°40′58.5″W

(United States) 2007 Grand Prix of Cleveland
Race details
- Race 5 of 14 in the 2007 Champ Car season
- Burke Lakefront Airport Track Layout
- Date: June 24, 2007
- Official name: Grand Prix of Cleveland Presented by LaSalle Bank
- Location: Burke Lakefront Airport; Cleveland, Ohio, United States
- Course: Temporary Airport Course; 2.106 mi / 3.389 km
- Distance: 89 laps 187.434 mi / 301.621 km
- Weather: Sunny/Cloudy

Pole position
- Driver: (France) Sébastien Bourdais (N/H/L Racing)
- Time: 56.363

Fastest lap
- Driver: (France) Sébastien Bourdais (N/H/L Racing)
- Time: 57.601 (on lap 56 of 89)

Podium
- First: (Canada) Paul Tracy (Forsythe Racing)
- Second: (Netherlands) Robert Doornbos (Minardi Team USA)
- Third: (Switzerland) Neel Jani (PKV Racing)

The 2007 Grand Prix of Cleveland is the fifth round of the 2007 Champ Car World Series Season. It was held on June 24 at the Burke Lakefront Airport, in Cleveland, Ohio. As of 2026, this is the last race held in the city.

== Qualifying results ==
Pos	Nat	Name	Team	Qual 1	Qual 2	Best
1	(France)	Sébastien Bourdais	N/H/L Racing	56.961	56.363	56.363
2	(France)	Simon Pagenaud	Team Australia	57.338	56.388	56.388
3	(Australia)	Will Power	Team Australia	57.301	56.473	56.473
4	(United States)	Graham Rahal	N/H/L Racing	57.658	56.588	56.588
5	(Netherlands)	Robert Doornbos	Minardi Team USA	57.745	56.751	56.751
6	(United Kingdom)	Dan Clarke	Minardi Team USA	57.855	57.001	57.001
7	(Canada)	Paul Tracy	Forsythe Racing	57.782	57.065	57.065
8	(United Kingdom)	Justin Wilson	RSPORTS	57.427	57.079	57.079
9	(Canada)	Alex Tagliani	RSPORTS	57.652	57.199	57.199
10	(Spain)	Oriol Servia	Forsythe Racing	57.722	57.380	57.380
11	(Switzerland)	Neel Jani	PKV Racing	57.535	57.400	57.400
12	(France)	Tristan Gommendy	PKV Racing	57.978	57.516	57.516
13	(United States)	Alex Figge	Pacific Coast Motorsports	59.117	57.626	57.626
14	(Brazil)	Bruno Junqueira	Dale Coyne Racing	57.811	57.758	57.758
15	(United Kingdom)	Katherine Legge	Dale Coyne Racing	58.681	57.811	57.811
16	(United Kingdom)	Ryan Dalziel	Pacific Coast Motorsports	58.238	57.928	57.928
17	(Belgium)	Jan Heylen	Conquest Racing	58.259	58.116	58.116

Sébastien Bourdais lead both Friday and Saturday's qualification sessions. Rookie Simon Pagenaud missed the pole by .025 of a second to score his first Champ Car front row starting position next to Bourdais. Bourdais chose to start from the left side of the track, opposite the traditional inside position leading to Cleveland's often frantic first turn.

== Race ==
Pos	No	Driver	Team	Laps	Time/Retired	Grid	Points
1	7	(Canada) Paul Tracy	Forsythe Racing	89	1:45:10.860	7	31
2	14	(Netherlands) Robert Doornbos	Minardi Team USA	89	+0.5 secs	5	27
3	21	(Switzerland) Neel Jani	PKV Racing	89	+5.4 secs	11	26
4	9	(United Kingdom) Justin Wilson	RSPORTS	89	+5.9 secs	8	23
5	15	(France) Simon Pagenaud	Team Australia	89	+6.3 secs	2	21
6	8	(Canada) Alex Tagliani	RSPORTS	89	+17.8 secs	9	19
7	3	(Spain) Oriol Servia	Forsythe Racing	89	+23.7 secs	10	17
8	2	(United States) Graham Rahal	N/H/L Racing	89	+24.7 secs	4	15
9	28	(United Kingdom) Ryan Dalziel	Pacific Coast Motorsports	89	+27.8 secs	16	13
10	5	(Australia) Will Power	Team Australia	89	+55.2 secs	3	11
11	4	(United Kingdom) Dan Clarke	Minardi Team USA	88	+ 1 Lap	6	10
12	1	(France) Sébastien Bourdais	N/H/L Racing	67	Mechanical	1	12
13	22	(France) Tristan Gommendy	PKV Racing	34	Contact	12	8
14	42	(Belgium) Jan Heylen	Conquest Racing	34	Contact	17	7
15	11	(United Kingdom) Katherine Legge	Dale Coyne Racing	32	Mechanical	15	6
16	19	(Brazil) Bruno Junqueira	Dale Coyne Racing	6	Contact	14	5
17	29	(United States) Alex Figge	Pacific Coast Motorsports	3	Mechanical	13	4

An incident-filled race ended with a surprise winner in Paul Tracy, his first victory since the 2005 Cleveland Grand Prix and 31st overall. Despite two early crashes which forced him to pit and have his crew replace his nose cone twice, Tracy managed to stay on the lead lap. Tracy found himself in lead on lap 70 during the last yellow flag period. The extra fuel he gained by his two early pit stops allowed him to gamble on fuel strategy. Robert Doornbos, recovering from an early setback of his own after he was black-flagged for blocking, was catching up to him quickly in the final laps but was unable to pass Tracy before the checkered flag after 89 laps.

Early in the race it looked as if the race would come down to a showdown between Will Power and Sébastien Bourdais as they raced nose to tail, with Bourdais leading from the standing start. Power, following the script Bourdais ran to in the Portland race, passed Bourdais after the first round of pit stops by staying out an extra lap. But the battle was aborted when Bourdais' car broke down on lap 67. Not long later, Power was forced to pit under green on lap 75 to change a tire that failed because of a broken valve.

== Caution flags ==
Laps	Cause
4-6	Rahal/Tracy crash
7-10	Junqueira/Tracy crash
36-41	Heylen/Gommendy crash
68-72	Bourdais/Clarke off course

== Notes ==
Laps	Leader
1-27	Sébastien Bourdais
28-29	Will Power
30-33	Graham Rahal
34	Paul Tracy
35-57	Will Power
58-62	Paul Tracy
63-69	Will Power
70-89	Paul Tracy

Driver	Laps led
Will Power	32
Sébastien Bourdais	27
Paul Tracy	26
Graham Rahal	4

- New Race Record: Paul Tracy 1:45:10.860

== Championship standings after the race ==
Drivers' Championship standings

	Pos	Driver	Points
	1	(France) Sébastien Bourdais	117
1	2	(Netherlands) Robert Doornbos	114
1	3	(Australia) Will Power	105
	4	(Canada) Alex Tagliani	97
	5	(United Kingdom) Justin Wilson	92

- Note: Only the top five positions are included.

== Attendance ==
Attendance at the 3 day race weekend was 151,426 people with over 65,000 fans attending the Champ Car raceday main event. This represented a 28% increase over 2006.

Previous race: 2007 Mazda Champ Car Grand Prix of Portland	Champ Car World Series; 2007 season	Next race: Champ Car Mont-Tremblant 07
Previous race: 2006 Grand Prix of Cleveland	Grand Prix of Cleveland	Next race: 2008 Grand Prix of Cleveland canceled by IndyCar/Champ Car merger
