= 2007 Vegas Grand Prix =

(United States) 2007 Las Vegas Grand Prix
Race details
- Race 1 of 14 in the 2007 Champ Car season
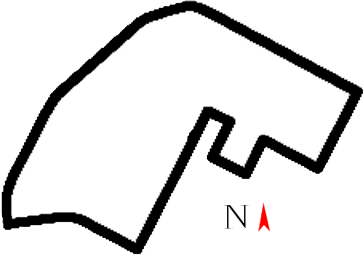
- Date: April 8, 2007
- Official name: XI Vegas Grand Prix
- Location: Vegas Grand Prix; Las Vegas, Nevada, United States
- Course: Temporary street circuit 2.440 mi / 3.927 km
- Distance: 68 laps 165.920 mi / 267.036 km
- Weather: Sunny with temperatures reaching up to 91 °F (33 °C); wind speeds approaching 17.1 miles per hour (27.5 km/h)

Pole position
- Driver: Will Power (Team Australia)
- Time: 1:17.629

Fastest lap
- Driver: Will Power (Team Australia)
- Time: 1:19.934 (on lap 44 of 68)

Podium
- First: Will Power (Team Australia)
- Second: (Netherlands) Robert Doornbos (Minardi Team USA)
- Third: (Canada) Paul Tracy (Forsythe Racing)

The 2007 Vegas Grand Prix was the first round of the 2007 Champ Car World Series Season, held on April 8 on the streets of Las Vegas, Nevada.

== Qualifying results ==
Pos	Nat	Name	Team	Qual 1	Qual 2	Best
1	(Australia)	Will Power	Team Australia	1:21.007	1:17.629	1:17.629
2	(Canada)	Paul Tracy	Forsythe Racing	1:19.784	1:19.625	1:19.625*
3	(Netherlands)	Robert Doornbos	Minardi Team USA	1:20.991	1:18.515	1:18.515
4	(Canada)	Alex Tagliani	RSPORTS	1:20.437	1:18.850	1:18.850
5	(France)	Simon Pagenaud	Team Australia	1:19.998	1:18.961	1:18.961
6	(Brazil)	Bruno Junqueira	Dale Coyne Racing	-	1:19.102	1:19.102
7	(Mexico)	Mario Domínguez	Forsythe Racing	1:22.384	1:19.156	1:19.156
8	(United Kingdom)	Justin Wilson	RSPORTS	1:20.310	1:19.269	1:19.269
9	(Switzerland)	Neel Jani	PKV Racing	1:21.618	1:19.360	1:19.360
10	(United States)	Graham Rahal	N/H/L Racing	1:23.307	1:19.710	1:19.710
11	(France)	Tristan Gommendy	PKV Racing	1:21.565	1:19.784	1:19.784
12	(United Kingdom)	Dan Clarke	Minardi Team USA	1:22.123	1:19.814	1:19.814
13	(United Kingdom)	Katherine Legge	Dale Coyne Racing	1:22.420	1:20.104	1:20.104
14	(New Zealand)	Matt Halliday	Conquest Racing	13:20.444	1:20.122	1:20.122
15	(Scotland)	Ryan Dalziel	Pacific Coast Motorsports	1:22.202	1:20.128	1:20.128
16	(France)	Sébastien Bourdais	N/H/L Racing	1:20.197	-	1:20.197
17	(United States)	Alex Figge	Pacific Coast Motorsports	1:22.788	1:20.313	1:20.313

- Tracy awarded 2nd on the starting grid for gaining provisional pole position.

== Grid ==
Row	Inside		Outside	
1	5	(Australia) Will Power	3	(Canada) Paul Tracy
2	14	(Netherlands) Robert Doornbos	8	(Canada) Alex Tagliani
3	15	(France) Simon Pagenaud	19	(Brazil) Bruno Junqueira
4	7	(Mexico) Mario Domínguez	9	(United Kingdom) Justin Wilson
5	21	(Switzerland) Neel Jani	2	(United States) Graham Rahal
6	22	(France) Tristan Gommendy	4	(United Kingdom) Dan Clarke
7	11	(United Kingdom) Katherine Legge	42	(New Zealand) Matt Halliday
8	28	(Scotland) Ryan Dalziel	1	(France) Sébastien Bourdais
9	29	(United States) Alex Figge		

== Race ==
The race was a fresh start for the Champ Car World Series. With a new car (Panoz DP01), new rules, including timed races and staggered starts, new teams like Pacific Coast Motorsports, a different season opener on a new track, and an eventual return to ABC/ESPN later in the year, all were the big stories of the day. The race would be one of survival of the fittest as many drivers were taken out by either crashes or mechanical failures. Newman/Haas/Lanigan Racing would not have a good day as 3-time champion Sébastien Bourdais was hampered by numerous tire problems and rookie Graham Rahal crashed on the frontstretch on the first lap. Will Power had the dominant car all day long, only being challenged consistently by Paul Tracy, who many saw as the man to unseat Bourdais as the face of Champ Car. In the end, the race would all come down to fuel mileage. Tracy's car struggled with taking a full load of fuel preventing him from snapping his winless streak. Will Power outlasted the field to take his first career victory, which was also the first Champ Car victory by an Australian, in a dominant fashion.

Pos	No	Driver	Team	Laps	Time/Retired	Grid	Points
1	5	(Australia) Will Power	Team Australia	68	1:45:13.637	1	34
2	14	(Netherlands) Robert Doornbos	Minardi Team USA	68	+16.789	3	27
3	3	(Canada) Paul Tracy	Forsythe Racing	68	+27.356	2	27
4	8	(Canada) Alex Tagliani	RSPORTS	68	+48.981	4	24
5	22	(France) Tristan Gommendy	PKV Racing	68	+1:10.396	11	21
6	11	(United Kingdom) Katherine Legge	Dale Coyne Racing	68	+1:21.261	13	20
7	19	(Brazil) Bruno Junqueira	Dale Coyne Racing	66	+ 1 Lap	6	18
8	29	(United States) Alex Figge	Pacific Coast Motorsports	63	+ 5 Laps	17	15
9	7	(Mexico) Mario Domínguez	Forsythe Racing	57	+ 11 Laps	7	13
10	21	(Switzerland) Neel Jani	PKV Racing	56	Mechanical	9	11
11	28	(Scotland) Ryan Dalziel	Pacific Coast Motorsports	52	+ 16 Laps	15	10
12	15	(France) Simon Pagenaud	Team Australia	47	Engine	5	9
13	1	(France) Sébastien Bourdais	N/H/L Racing	30	Accident	16	8
14	9	(United Kingdom) Justin Wilson	RSPORTS	20	Input shaft	8	7
15	4	(United Kingdom) Dan Clarke	Minardi Team USA	13	Accident	12	6
16	42	(New Zealand) Matt Halliday	Conquest Racing	3	Accident	14	5
17	2	(United States) Graham Rahal	N/H/L Racing	1	Accident	10	4

== Caution flags ==
Laps	Cause
1	Yellow Start
2-5	Rahal/Halliday crash
6-7	Figge stalled
14-17	Clarke crash

== Notes ==
Laps	Leader
1	Will Power
2-10	Paul Tracy
11-27	Will Power
28-38	Alex Tagliani
39-45	Will Power
46-48	Bruno Junqueira
49-55	Paul Tracy
56-68	Will Power

Driver	Laps led
Will Power	38
Paul Tracy	16
Alex Tagliani	11
Bruno Junqueira	3

  - New Race Lap Record: Will Power: 1:19.934
  - New Race Record: Will Power: 1:45:13.637 (68 Laps)
- This was not only Will Power's first victory, but also the first victory for an Australian in Champ Car.
- The win was also the first for Team Australia owner Derrick Walker since 1999.

== Attendance ==
Attendance at the inaugural 2007 event was estimated to be 40,000 fans on race day. This surpassed the number of seats available on the course's temporary grandstands facilitating an expansion for the 2008 season.

== Future of the race ==
This was the third race for Champ Car in Las Vegas, but the only one held on a downtown street course. Two oval Grands Prix had taken place at Las Vegas Motor Speedway: the 2004 Bridgestone 400 and the 2005 Hurricane Relief 400. The planned 2008 race was removed from the calendar due to Champ Car's merge with the Indy Racing League (IRL).

IndyCar returned to Las Vegas in 2011, however the return was at Las Vegas Motor Speedway, rather than to a downtown street course.

Previous race: 2006 Gran Premio de México; Previous Season	Champ Car World Series; 2007 season	Next race: 2007 Toyota Grand Prix of Long Beach
Previous race: 2005 Hurricane Relief 400 (Las Vegas Motor Speedway)	Champ Car in Las Vegas	Next race: 2011 IZOD IndyCar World Championship (Las Vegas Motor Speedway; IndyCar Series event)
