= Championship Auto Racing Teams =

Defunct North American open-wheel auto racing organization

- Sport: Auto racing
- Jurisdiction: United States; Canada
- Abbreviation: CART
- Founded: 1979
- Headquarters: Troy, Michigan, United States (1979–2002); Indianapolis, Indiana, United States (2002–2003)
- President: Andrew Craig (1994–2000); Bobby Rahal, interim (2000); Joe Heitzler (2001); Chris Pook (2002–2003)
- Closure date: 2003
- Fate: Rebranded to Champ Car World Series
- Other key staff: Roger Penske, Pat Patrick, Dan Gurney, Bob Fletcher, Jim Hall, Carl Haas, Wally Dallenbach

Championship Auto Racing Teams (CART) was a sanctioning body for American open-wheel car racing that operated from 1979 until dissolving after the 2003 season. CART was founded in 1979 by team owners formerly from the United States Auto Club (USAC) Championship Car division. The owners disagreed with the direction and leadership of USAC. They developed a then-novel business model of team owners sanctioning and promoting their own series collectively rather than relying on a neutral governing body to do so.

While the CART owners broke off to form their own series, the sport's biggest race and centerpiece – the Indianapolis 500 – remained under the sanctioning control of USAC. During the 1980s and 1990s, the CART Indy Car World Series became the pre-eminent open-wheel auto racing series in North America. It featured a diverse schedule of superspeedways, short ovals, road courses, and street circuits. The CART-based teams continued to compete at the Indianapolis 500, essentially as a one-off race each season. From 1983 to 1995, an arrangement was put in place in which the Indy 500 would count in the CART championship points standings. Though it was still sanctioned by USAC, the Indy 500 was effectively part of the CART season schedule.

Even as the series prospered, concerns about costs, competitiveness, and revenue sharing began to create opposition to CART's organizational structure. Attempts at reform, which saw the company rebranded as IndyCar in 1992 and a compromise board formed, failed. In 1996, an open wheel "split" saw the newly created Indy Racing League (IRL) take full control over the Indianapolis 500 and start a competing oval-based open-wheel series. CART ceased using the IndyCar name but continued its series without participating in the Indianapolis 500.

The "split" saw a dramatic drop in interest in open wheel racing in the United States, which was compounded by the growing popularity of NASCAR, creating a downward trend in sponsorship and attendance at some tracks. After a series of additional setbacks in the early 2000s, several of the major teams and manufacturers defected to the rival IRL. CART went bankrupt at the end of the 2003 season.

In 2004, a trio of team owners acquired the assets of the series from bankruptcy, rebranding it the Champ Car World Series (CCWS). Continuing financial difficulties caused Champ Car to file for bankruptcy before its planned 2008 season; CART and CCWS assets and history were merged into the IRL's IndyCar Series.

== Vehicles ==
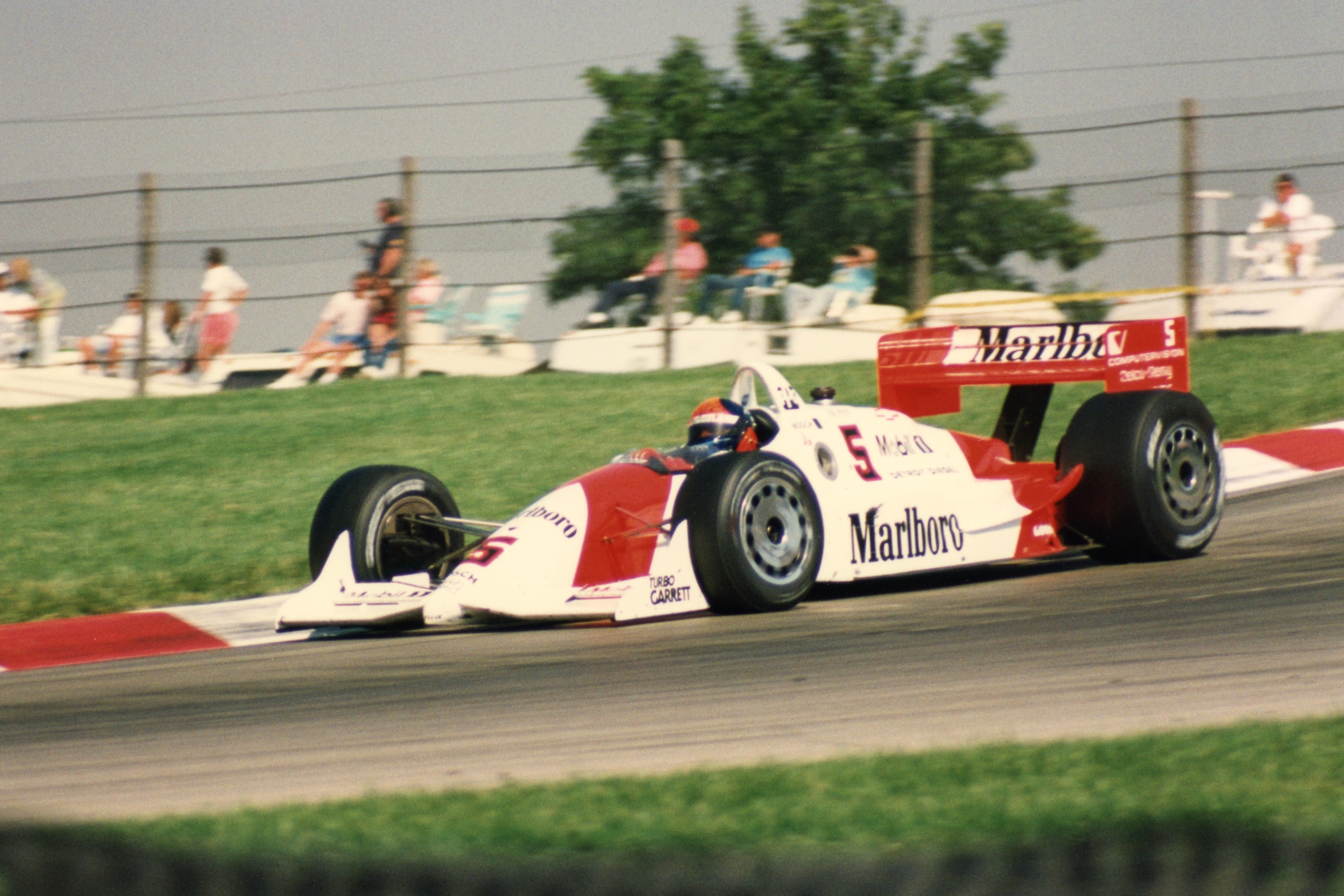
Emerson Fittipaldi in a Penske-Chevrolet at Mid-Ohio, 1992.

Champ cars (commonly referred to as "Indy cars" before 1997) were single-seat, open-wheel racing cars, with mid-mounted engines. Champ cars had sculpted undersides to create ground effects and prominent wings to create downforce. The cars would use different aerodynamic kits depending on whether they were racing on an oval or a road-course.

Teams typically purchased chassis constructed by independent suppliers such as Lola, Swift, Reynard, and March, with some owners, such as Dan Gurney and Roger Penske, constructing their own. The series exclusively used Goodyear tires until 1995, when Firestone entered, creating a spirited competition between the brands. Firestone ultimately became the exclusive supplier in 2000, with their parent company Bridgestone taking over the role in 2002.

Champ cars used turbocharged engines that ran on methanol fuel. Cosworth (later branded as the Ford-Cosworth), Ilmor (branded as Chevrolet), and Buick engines were common powerplants through the mid-1990s. Mercedes-Benz took over as Ilmor's branding, while Honda and Toyota joined as factory efforts. By the 1990s, engines were typically leased from manufacturers, who conducted research and development during the racing season; one engine could easily dominate competition in the first part of the season and then fall behind. The exclusive availability of more advanced versions of engines to certain teams in the early-1990s became a major source of contention within the organization, and manufacturers fiercely resisted proposals to have engines simply be purchased by teams. In 2003, after the withdrawal of Honda and Toyota, CART purchased a series of identical 2.65L V-8 turbocharged Cosworth engines and leased them to teams under Ford branding.

Champ cars were visually similar, and often compared to, the higher budget and more technical Formula 1 cars, which also featured wings, mid-engines, and an open-wheel design. Due to their use on ovals, Champ Cars weighed more and were more substantial in size, were slower to accelerate but were higher in top speed. Both series intentionally downplayed direct comparisons for commercial reasons, but 2002 saw a rare occurrence in both series running the same track (Circuit Gilles Villeneuve in Montreal) within a month of each other. Former Chip Ganassi Racing driver Juan Pablo Montoya won the pole position for the Formula One race with a lap time of 1'12.836, with the slowest being Alex Yoong's 1'17.34; Several weeks later, Cristiano da Matta won pole position in a Champ Car race with a lap time of 1'18.959.

== History ==
=== Foundation ===
American open-wheel car racing (IndyCar) sanctioning timeline
Sanctioning body	1905–		1910s	1920s	1930s	1940s	1950s	1960s	1970s	1980s		1990s		2000s	2010s	2020s
AAA		unofficial	WWI			WWII										
USAC										*						
CART										*	CART	IndyCar	CART	Champ Car		
IRL													IRL	IndyCar		
Golden bar indicates which body sanctioned the Indy 500 each year. White text indicates name of racing series (when applicable).

Original logo of CART, used from 1979 to 1991.

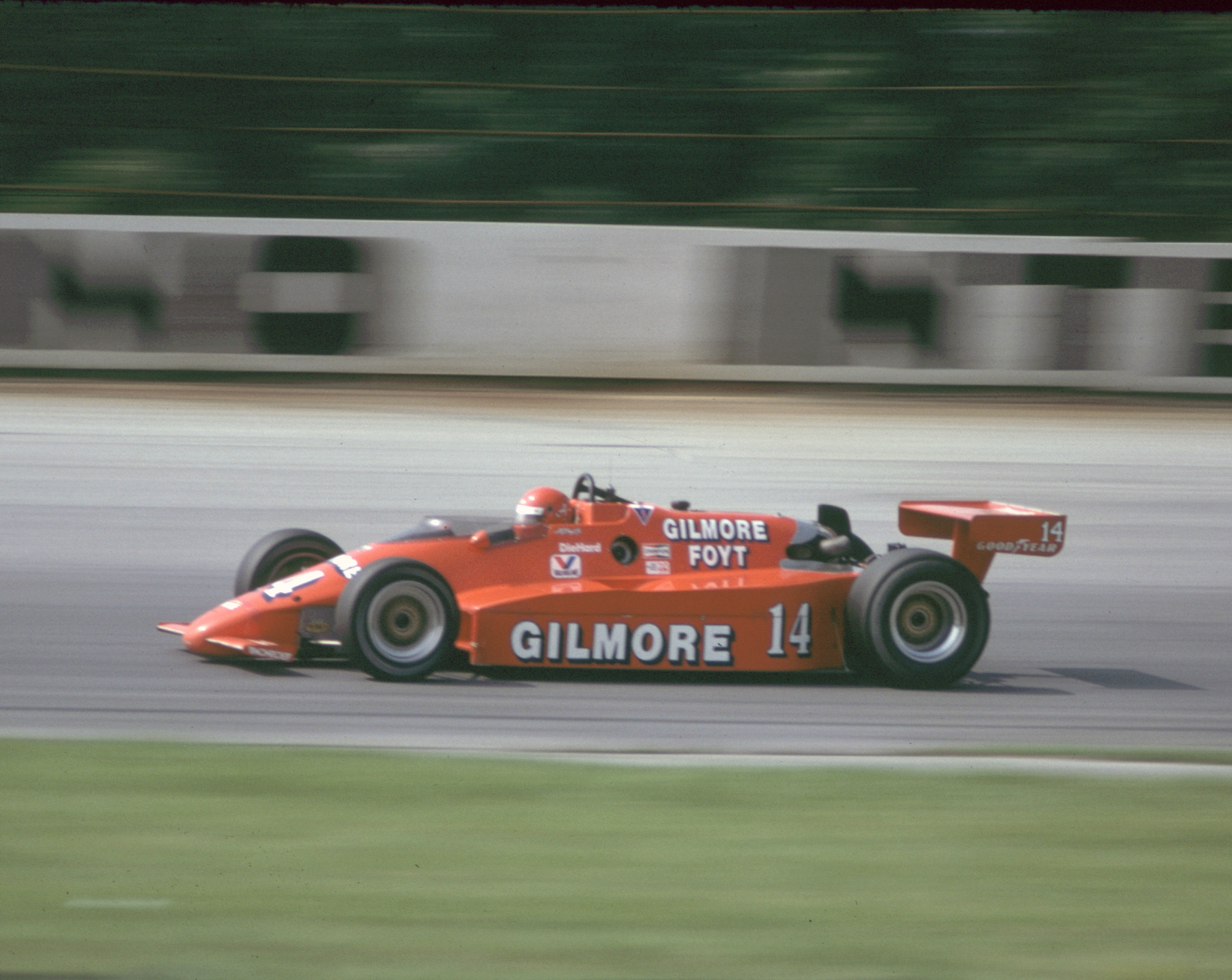
A. J. Foyt March/Cosworth at Pocono in 1984.

In 1905 the American Automobile Association (AAA) established a national driving championship and became the first sanctioning body for auto racing in the United States. The AAA ceased sanctioning auto racing in the general outrage over motor racing safety that followed the 1955 Le Mans disaster. In response, Indianapolis Motor Speedway president Tony Hulman formed the United States Auto Club (USAC) to take over the sanctioning of what was called "championship" auto racing, or open wheel racing, whose biggest event was the annual Indianapolis 500 at the Indianapolis Motor Speedway. USAC sanctioned the championship exclusively until 1978, and was the Fédération Internationale de l'Automobile's (FIA) recognized American authority with regard to open wheel racing.

Competitors in the championship circuit, coalescing around Dan Gurney, began to become critical of USAC's sanctioning though the 1970s. Notable incidents included the loss of a lucrative series sponsorship by Marlboro in 1971 after USAC failed to enforce the brand's exclusivity at events, the existence of dirt tracks, purses that teams said would result in a loss in money even if the team made the podium, and a lack of modern promotion for the non-Indianapolis events in the series.

In early 1978, Gurney wrote what came to be known as the "Gurney White Paper", the blueprint for an organization called Championship Auto Racing Teams. Gurney took his inspiration from the improvements Bernie Ecclestone had forced on Formula One with his creation of the Formula One Constructors Association. The white paper called for the owners to form CART as an advocacy group to promote their interests in USAC's national championship. The group would also work to negotiate television rights, sponsorship agreements, and race purses, and ideally hold seats on USAC's governing body. In 1978, the last season that USAC was sole sanctioning body for championship racing, their 18 race schedule had 4 road course races and 14 oval track races.

On April 23, 1978, eight top USAC officials died in an airplane crash, creating an organizational vacuum that severely hampered the 1978 season. In November 1978 Gurney, joined by other leading team owners including Roger Penske and Pat Patrick, took their requests to USAC's Board, but the proposal was rejected, leading to the creation of a new stand-alone series. The first CART race was held on 11 March 1979, with the Sports Car Club of America (SCCA) sanctioning the series.

USAC initially tried to ban all CART drivers from the 1979 Indianapolis 500, informing CART teams by telegram during their event at Atlanta Motor Speedway, until CART succeeded in obtaining an injunction to allow its cars to qualify. Of the 20 races held in 1979, 13 were part of the 1979 CART Championship. An attempt by USAC and CART to jointly sanction races in 1980 as the Championship Racing League saw USAC withdraw after 5 races, and by the end of 1981 the only USAC sanctioned asphalt championship race was the Indianapolis 500.

=== CART PPG Indy Car World Series (1982–1991) ===
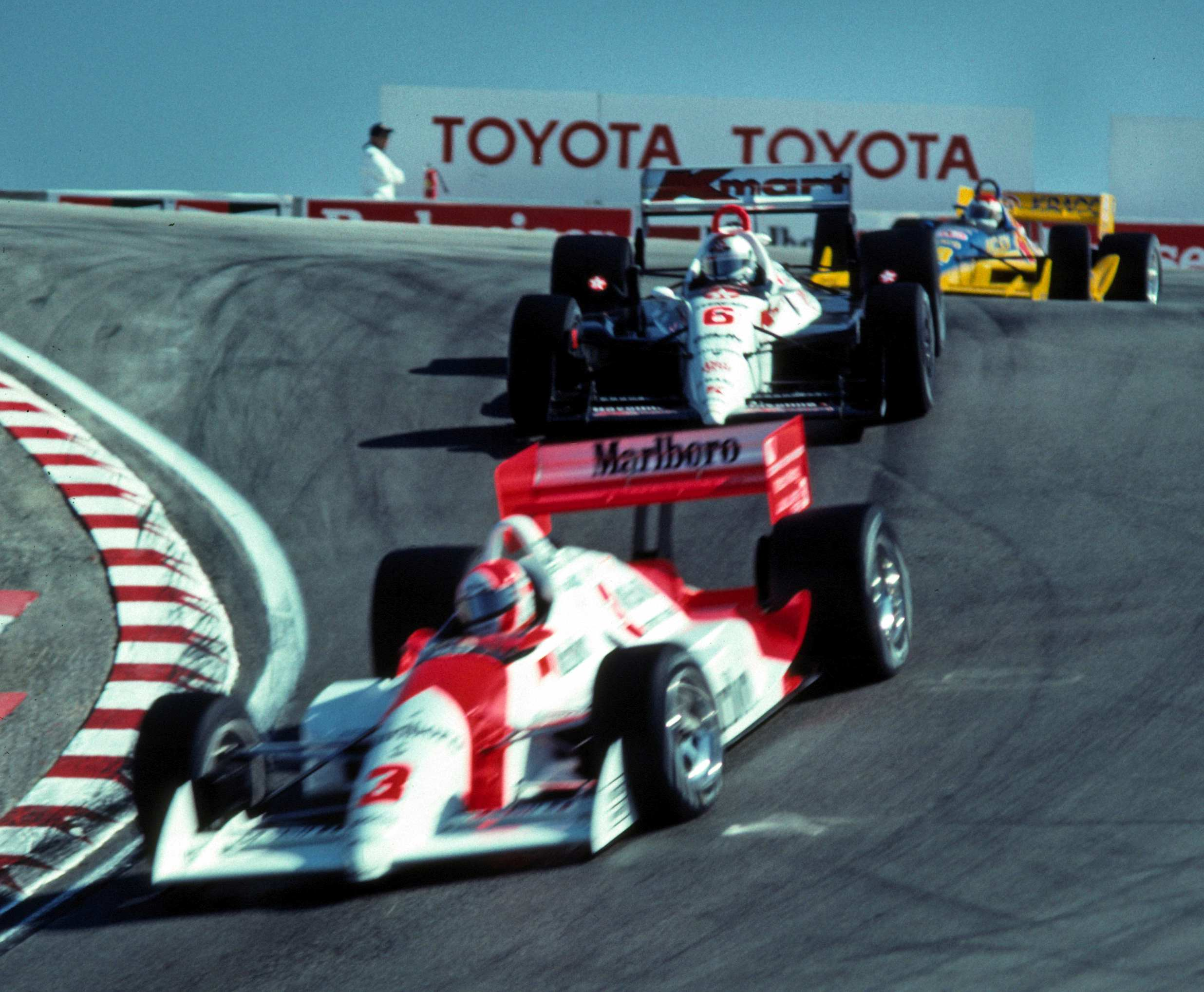
In order, Rick Mears, Mario Andretti, and Bobby Rahal at Laguna Seca, 1991.

By 1982, the CART PPG Indy Car World Series was generally recognized as the American national championship in open wheel racing. In 1983, USAC agreed to allow CART to add the Indy 500 to its schedule and have drivers be awarded points in the CART championship while retaining their authority to sanction the 500. Beginning with a schedule mainly based on oval speedways like its USAC predecessor, the series began to replace the declining Can-Am series in prominent North American road racing circuits such as Road America, Mid-Ohio, and Laguna Seca. Many racing stars, including Mario Andretti, Bobby Rahal, and Danny Sullivan found success in CART, which by the mid-1980s expanded by sanctioning street races, taking over the Detroit Grand Prix and the Grand Prix of Long Beach from Formula One, and expanding to Toronto and Cleveland. CART founded the first full-time driver safety team that traveled with the series, instead of depending on local staff provided by promoters.

For the first time, open-wheel racing outside of Indianapolis had developed a stable schedule, enabling more generous sponsorship and television opportunities for team owners. Despite the corresponding increases in attendance, TV revenue, and purses, CART's egalitarian governing structure created its own headaches. CART owners were incredibly diverse: For example, owners such as Carl Haas and Roger Penske owned speedways and had generous contracts with tire, chassis, and engine manufactures, while other teams simply purchased older cars and ran the races they could afford to attend. The diversity of interests led to annual disputes and accusations of real and apparent conflicts of interest with regard to rules, sponsorship, driver safety, track selection, and other matters.

In 1988, CART joined ACCUS, allowing foreign drivers to compete without risking their FIA Super Licences. This, combined with former F1 champion Emerson Fittipaldi's series title in 1989, attracted drivers from South America and Europe to join what had previously been a mostly American dominated series. A growing contingent of international drivers helped make the series a valuable television property for growing sports cable networks worldwide. CART would host its first race outside North America, in Surfers Paradise, Australia, in 1991.

=== IndyCar and the "Split" (1992–1996) ===
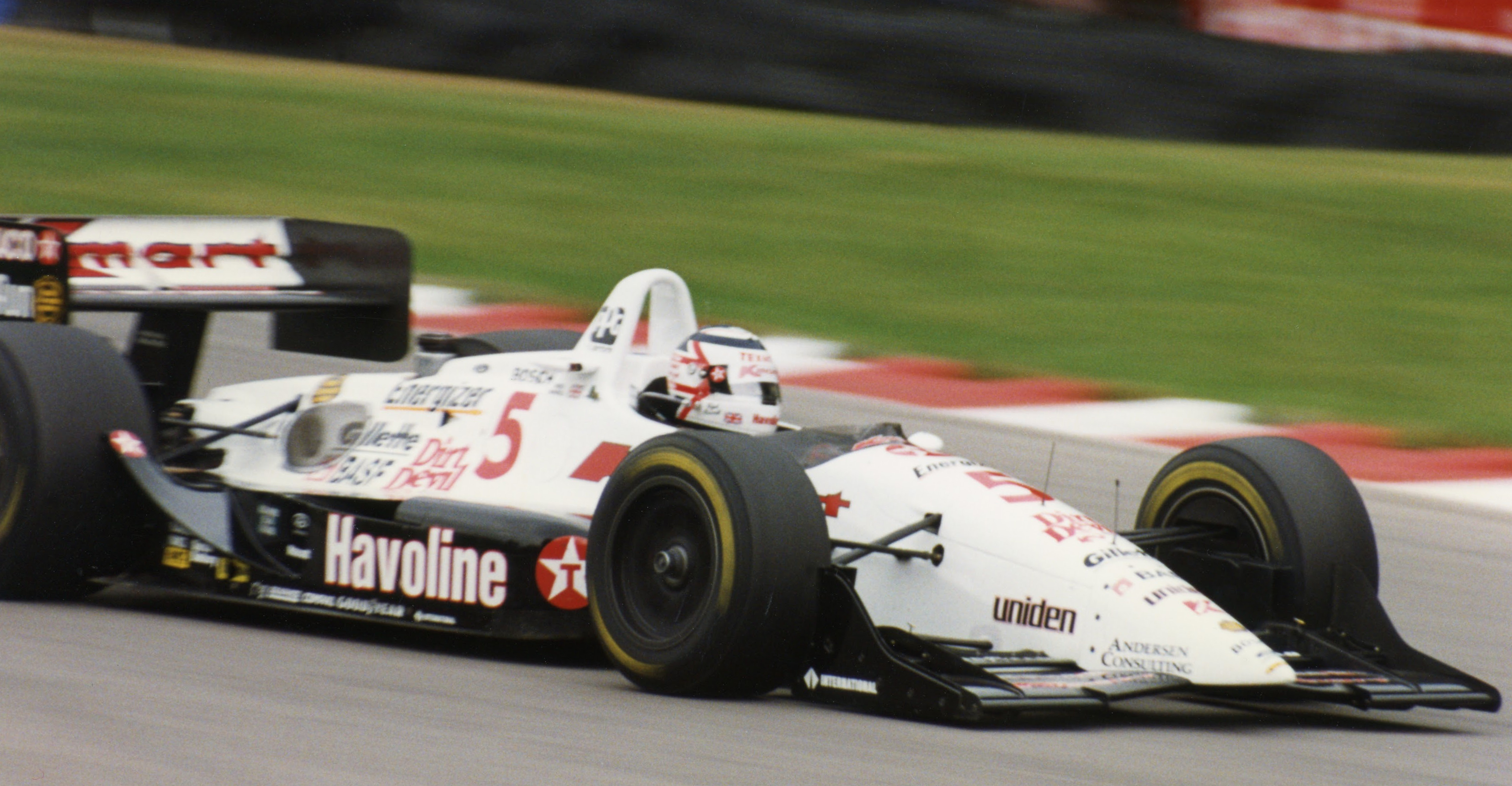
Nigel Mansell racing in a Lola-Ford in 1993.

Tony Hulman's grandson, Tony George, became president of the Indianapolis Motor Speedway (IMS) in 1989. He and others viewed foreign drivers and street circuits as discouraging predominantly American USAC sprint racing talent, such as Jeff Gordon, from competing in CART. NASCAR, which ran predominantly on ovals, was gaining in popularity in CART's traditional Midwestern US market at the time. Costs were also rapidly increasing and pricing out smaller teams, as the larger teams and engine and chassis manufacturers competed for victories.

Critics regularly accused CART of only serving the interests of team owners, especially the richest ones, and not of the sport as a whole; the owners countered that the teams – who took the most risks, paid the drivers, and expended the most cash – should control the general direction of the sport. CART owners also resented George, and felt that his close relationship with the USAC meant he could jeopardize the series' involvement in the Indianapolis 500 on a whim. Debate continued for a number of years over the proper oversight mechanism for the sport, with IMS resisting any revenue sharing or control over the Indianapolis 500 and team owners not wanting to give too much power to track promoters. In an attempt to address these concerns, CART rebranded as IndyCar in 1992, and later that year formed a compromise board. The owners would elect five members with voting rights, while the IndyCar CEO (representing the other owners) and George (representing IMS) would have non-voting seats.

In 1993, British driver Nigel Mansell, the 1992 F1 Driver's Champion, switched to IndyCar and beat out Fittipaldi for the championship. After the season, the compromise CART board collapsed following a series of controversial decisions, mainly shutting out Japanese manufacturers, canceling a planned race at Brands Hatch in the United Kingdom, and not increasing the number of races on the 1994 schedule. Team owners angry with the decisions believed they were motivated by the personal business interests of George and two powerful owners, Roger Penske and Carl Haas, rather than the good of the sport as a whole.

The conflict between George and CART owners came to a head in 1994. On January 7, the organization named Andrew Craig, a British sports marketing executive, as its new president and CEO, replacing William Stokkan. The same day, George resigned his non-voting seat on the board; IMS stated that George's resignation had nothing to do with Craig's appointment, but rather it was out of frustration with CART's decision to revert to a 16-member board after the collapse of the five-member compromise board late the previous year. That year, Team Penske introduced a Mercedes-Benz engine specifically designed for the 1994 Indianapolis 500 that exploited a rule difference between the USAC and IndyCar, dominating the race and prompting fears that costs would continue to grow out of control. In July, IMS announced the founding of the Indy Racing League, which would be cost-controlled, raced solely on American ovals, and be sanctioned by the USAC.

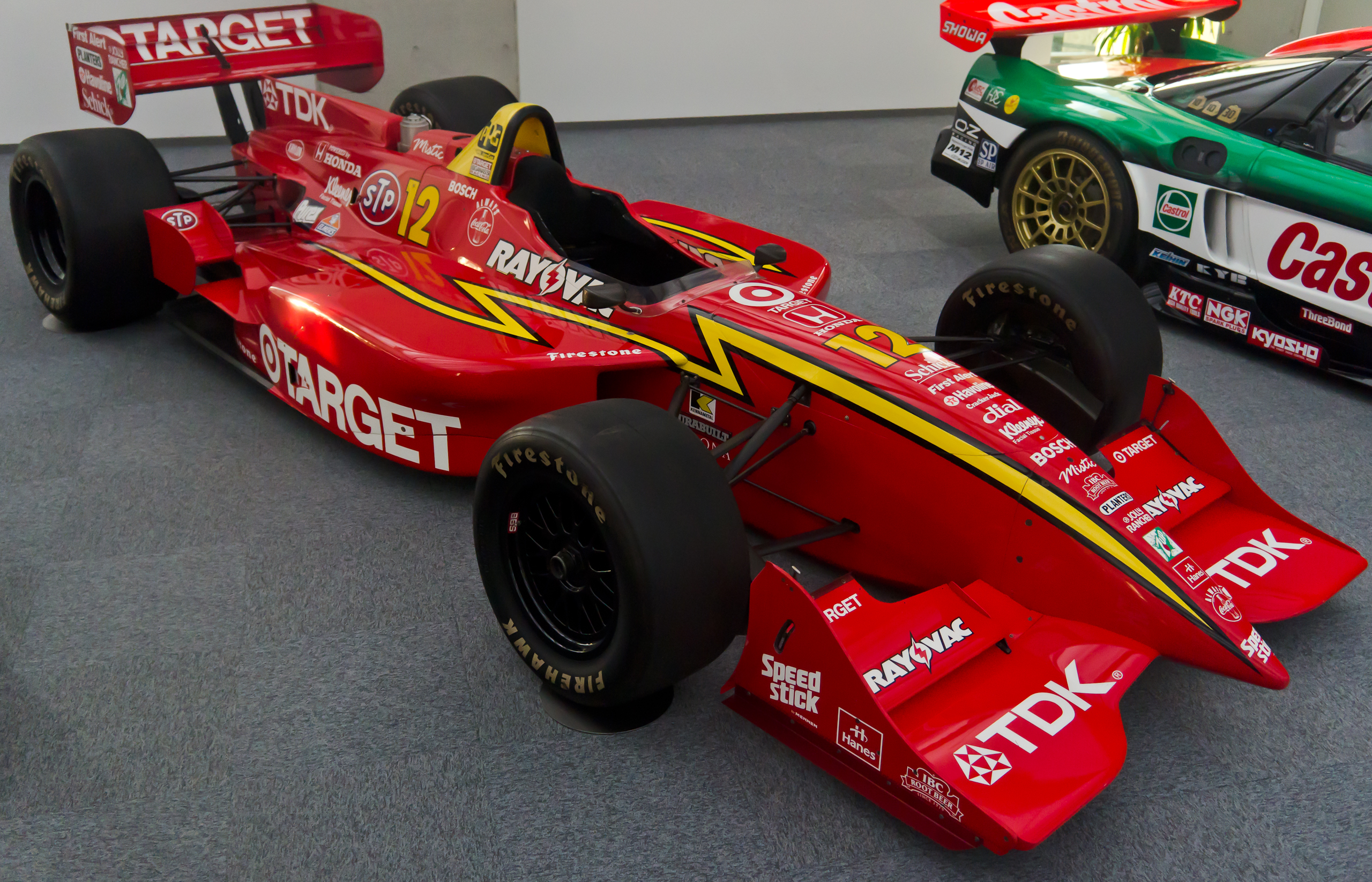
Target-Chip Ganassi Racing would win CART drivers championships with Jimmy Vasser (1996, car pictured), Alex Zanardi (1997 and 1998), and Juan Pablo Montoya (1999).

After the 1995 Indianapolis 500 George announced that for the 1996 Indianapolis 500 the top 25 drivers in IRL points would be guaranteed a spot in the race, leaving only eight of the 33 grid positions available to others. This was known as the "25/8 Rule," and was unprecedented, as the 500 had traditionally always put every spot up for open qualification. CART alleged they had been locked out of the event and would no longer race at Indianapolis, while George declared that CART was boycotting the 500. To placate sponsors who contractually required the accommodation of large contingents to attend Indianapolis, CART created a rival showcase event, the U.S. 500, at Michigan International Speedway on the same day as the Indy 500 in 1996. In March, IMS attempted to terminate CART's license to their "IndyCar" trademark in federal court.

The lead-up to Memorial Day 1996 saw a public relations war pitting the owners and drivers of CART against George and IMS, which included Indianapolis legends like the Unser and Andretti families publicly criticizing the new rules and labelling the Indy 500, with less experienced drivers, as unsafe. The 1996 Indianapolis 500 did see a series of accidents, with a quarter of the race run under caution before Buddy Lazier won his first race. The U.S. 500, starting halfway through the Indy 500, had a disastrous start with a twelve-car crash, delaying the race for an hour. Jimmy Vasser, who won by 11 seconds, quipped "Who needs milk?" while exiting his car for the podium, referring to the tradition of the Indy 500 winner drinking a bottle of milk in victory lane. Both at the time and in retrospect, the weekend was seen as a fiasco that began a serious decline in open-wheel racing, with both the Indy 500 and other IndyCar events seeing drastic decline in prominence, television viewership, and attendance.

=== CART FedEx Championship Series (1997–2000) ===
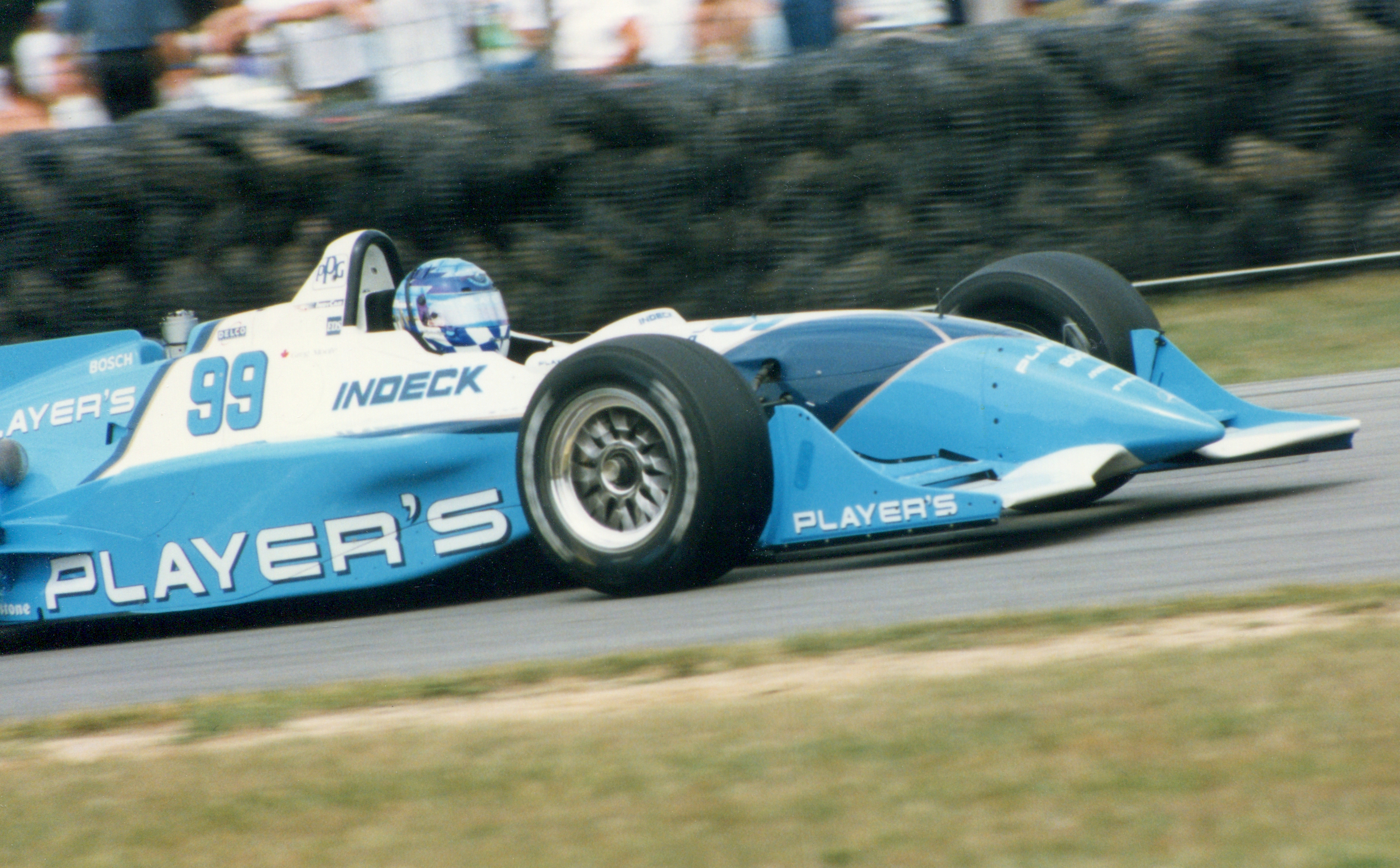
Greg Moore in a 1996 Reynard-Mercedes. Moore's death in 1999 left the series without one of its rising stars.

After a number of competing lawsuits, CART agreed to revert to their formal initialism following the 1996 season, on the condition that the IRL would not use the IndyCar name before the end of the 2002 season. CART began promoting its vehicles as "champ cars," the term that had previously been used by USAC's championship division.

In the early years after the CART–IRL split, CART was in a far stronger position. It held most of the prestigious races, sponsorship money, most of the "name" drivers and teams, and was the preferred series for manufacturers due to the IRL's ban on engine leases. The IRL's primary asset was Indianapolis Motor Speedway and its 500. 1996 and 1997 saw generally well-regarded racing with stars such as Vasser, rookie sensation Alex Zanardi, and Michael Andretti leading the points standings, while the IRL experienced growing pains, including a rain-soaked 1997 Indianapolis 500, off-putting engine sounds from their new normally-aspirated engines, and the abandonment of USAC sanctioning due to incompetence.

CART, in further contrast to IMS's sole ownership of the IRL, opted to proceed with a public stock offering, selling on the NASDAQ as stock symbol MPH. The offering raised US$100 million by selling 35% of the company. While this allowed CART to have sufficient cash reserves to expand and purchase the Indy Lights series, commentators suggested it was short-sighted to subject the notoriously secretive and fluctuating finances of the auto racing industry to public trading requirements.

Efforts, led mostly by engine manufacturers, to pressure CART and the IRL to at least adopt uniform engine standards were met with a cold refusal from the IRL, which started to carve a niche in the motorsports landscape by leveraging close relationships with the new NASCAR spec ovals being built, with the series' substantial losses being underwritten by the other revenue streams of IMS.

Despite the split, CART saw its annual revenues increase from $38,000,000 in 1995 to $68,800,000 by 1999, street races remained lucrative, and teams were able to make some gains on sponsorship revenues. The success was uneven, as the series' traditional oval races in Michigan and Nazareth began to see dramatic attendance declines, which CART blamed on substandard marketing. Television ratings and revenue were anemic, with the series receiving $5,000,000 annually for the entirety of its television package, less than the rate for some individual NASCAR races. While CART's stock was generally considered healthy, investors noted that the company's valuation tended to fluctuate with the perceived success or failure of IRL merger talks.

CART's championship battle in 1999 between young stars Juan Pablo Montoya and Dario Franchitti was overshadowed by the deaths of drivers Gonzalo Rodríguez and Greg Moore within two months of each other. Moore's death at the 1999 Marlboro 500 especially raised serious concerns about safety in the 500-mile races conducted in Fontana and Michigan that saw Champ Cars average speeds of near 240 mph (390 km/h).

In 2000, after years of frustration building behind the scenes, CART owners forced Andrew Craig to resign as CEO, and popular driver/owner Bobby Rahal stepped in as his interim replacement. Seeing the continued success of street racing and the decline of the series' oval dates, the board announced an intention of moving away from traditional venues toward overseas ovals and more street races to generate sanctioning fees, to the frustration of some of the traditional owners and United States–based sponsors.

Chip Ganassi, under pressure from his main sponsors, also persuaded the board to leave Memorial Day open on the schedule and returned to the Indy 500 with Vasser and Montoya. Montoya put on a dominating performance at Indy, leading 167 of the 200 laps to win. The Ganassi team's primary advantage was the greater engineering put into their IRL-spec car. 2000 would see Team Penske's return to prominence as Gil de Ferran won the driver's title.

=== Decline and financial woes (2001–2003) ===
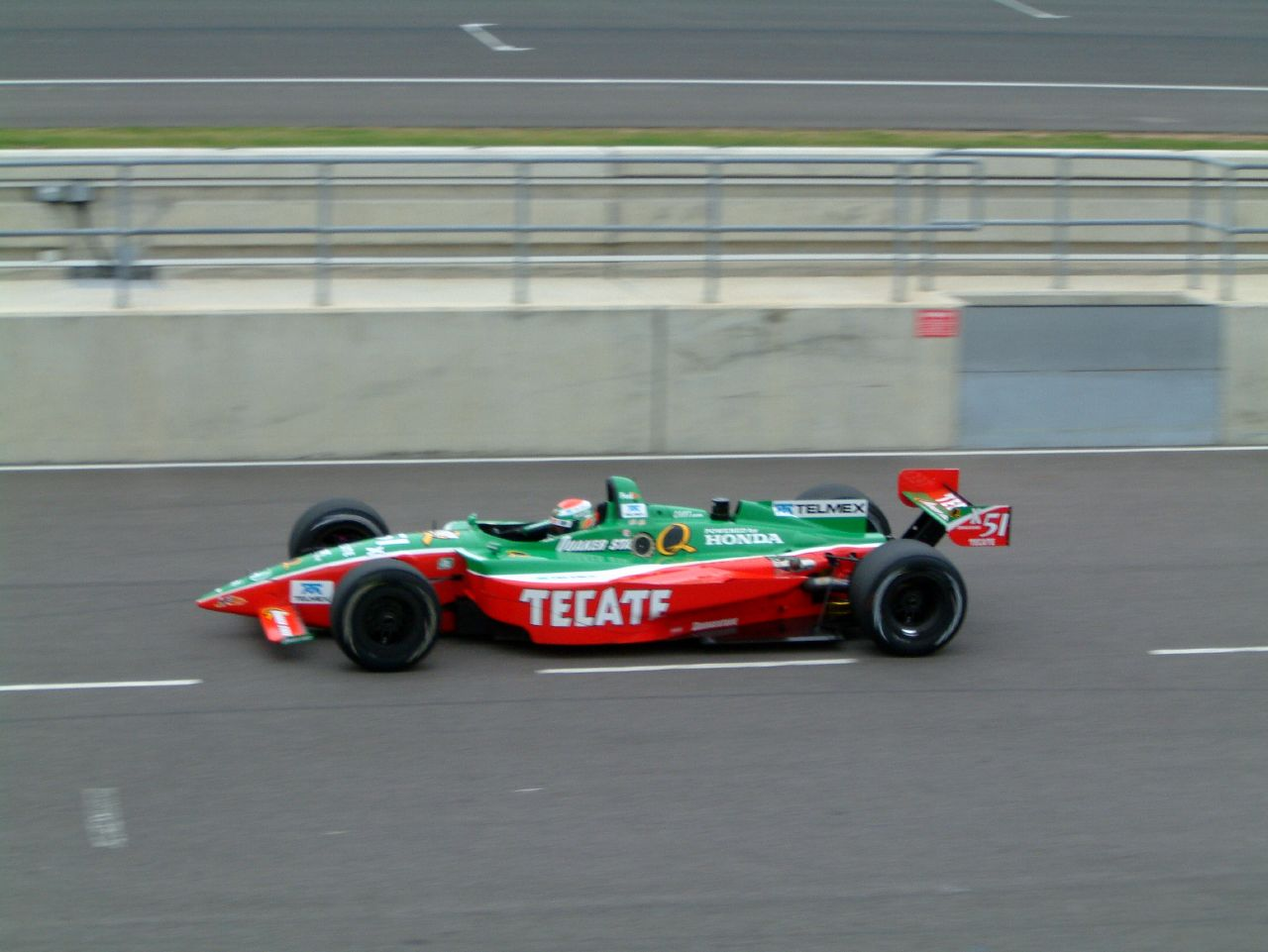
Adrian Fernandez in a 2002 Lola-Honda.

Final logo of CART before its bankruptcy, used in 2003.

For 2001, CART unveiled their most ambitious schedule yet, with 22 races in the United States, Canada, Mexico, Brazil, Japan, the United Kingdom, Germany and Australia. The loss of Homestead-Miami and Gateway to the IRL was to be offset by the addition of Texas Motor Speedway, which had seen an exciting IRL race the year prior. Rahal retired to head Jaguar Racing in Formula 1, leading to marketing expert Joseph Heitzler taking the helm.

Brazil was cancelled after track promoters defaulted. The race at Texas Motor Speedway had to be cancelled on race day, due to concerns of drivers blacking out at the high G forces created by Champ cars on the heavily banked course during qualifying. While applauded for putting driver safety first, the cancellation was a publicity disaster, and CART was criticized for not conducting enough pre-race testing on the circuit. A resulting lawsuit, while settled, produced a quarterly loss for CART's stock and forever harmed its relationship with track owner Speedway Motorsports.

Despite CART teams sweeping the top 6 positions in the 2001 Indianapolis 500 and a highly competitive four-way points battle among Gil de Ferran, Kenny Brack, Hélio Castroneves, and Michael Andretti, headlines centered on a technological controversy regarding a turbo pop off valve that Honda and Ford had developed, prompting complaints by Toyota. When CART mandated changes in the valve to help equalize the competition, Honda successfully obtained an injunction barring the change, leading to all three manufacturers being upset. Toyota would announce it would move to the IRL for 2003 at the end of the season.

The series' first foray into Europe, the German 500, was overshadowed by the 9/11 attacks that occurred the Tuesday before the Saturday race. With the teams unable to leave due to the worldwide shutdown of airspace, CART decided to run the race as scheduled after some controversy, with ESPN refusing to air the race live. The race would see popular former champion Alex Zanardi lose both legs in an accident. The series inaugural event in the United Kingdom would come close to being cancelled due to track concerns.

To keep coverage of the Indianapolis 500, ABC/ESPN signed an exclusive television deal for 2002 onwards with the IRL, forcing CART to turn to Speed Channel for cable coverage and buy time on CBS to maintain a broadcast presence. Team Penske announced after the season that they would become permanent entrants in the IRL for 2002 due to pressure from sponsor Marlboro resulting from the American tobacco settlements that prevented cigarette advertising in multiple series.

The loss of ESPN/ABC's exposure and engine manufacturer sponsoring began a downward spiral for the series, as race promoters began demanding reduced sanctioning fees for 2002 and sponsors began to review their agreements. Heitzler was fired by the CART board in the offseason, being replaced by Chris Pook, the well-regarded CEO of the Long Beach Grand Prix. Making matters worse was CART's growing ownership instability due to the public offering: Despite an initial agreement for the car owners to maintain 65% of the stock, agreements allowed owners to divest shares in the company. As car owners began to sell off their shares, the board's chronic issues grew more complicated with aggressive stockholders beginning to pressure the board alongside owners.

During the 2002 season, Honda announced that it would move to the IRL the following year, causing a drastic decline in CART's stock and leaving Cosworth/Ford as the sole engine manufacturer for 2003. Attempts to subsidize teams to have enough cars racing to avoid breaching sanctioning contracts led to a further decline in cash reserves and the stock price. Team owner Gerald Forsythe was able to purchase enough stock to control 22.5% of the voting shares in concert with the board. Star driver Michael Andretti purchased the prominent Team Green and moved them to the IRL with heavy direction from Honda, and Chip Ganassi Racing left due to pressure from its primary sponsor, Target.

Beginning in 2003, after the withdrawal of FedEx as series sponsor, CART re-branded itself as "Bridgestone Presents The Champ Car World Series Powered by Ford". The series ran a near complete schedule of road course races, featuring chassis from the year before.

=== Reformation as Champ Car ===
CART, running out of cash reserves, declared bankruptcy after the 2003 season and its assets were liquidated. The IRL made a strategic bid to keep the series dormant, while a trio of CART owners (Forsythe, Paul Gentilozzi, and Kevin Kalkhoven) along with Dan Pettit made a bid for CART's assets as Open Wheel Racing Series, LLC. The bankruptcy court ruled in favor of the OWRS bid as more beneficial to creditors than the IRL bid, despite it being smaller.

Champ Car would continue to run until declaring bankruptcy and being "reunified" with the IRL in February 2008. IndyCar recognizes the records and champions of both series in its historical records.

== Television ==
In its early years, television coverage of CART races were shared by NBC, ABC and ESPN. NBC left after the 1990 season, and returned for 1994's race in Toronto only. CBS also aired races from 1989 to 1991 and also aired the 1995 race at Nazareth. ABC, ESPN and ESPN2 continued as broadcasters until 2001.

In the 2002 and 2003 Champ Car seasons, coverage was split between CBS and Speed Channel (Fox aired the 2002 Toyota Grand Prix of Long Beach). Also from 2002 to 2004, select races aired on high definition channel HDNet such as Road America race in 2003.

Outside the United States, Screensport showed CART in the UK, Ireland, Scandinavia, France, Germany and the Benelux countries including the Indy 500 from 1984-1992.

Eurosport aired CART and Champ Car in Europe from 1993 until its demise. In the UK Sky Sports showed the races in 1992 on a tape delay and the Indy 500 live.

ITV showed races on World of Sport and later on as a bought in programme as part of the Night Time service in 1988 and later highlights between 1993 and 1994.

From 1997 to 2001, Channel 5 showed races on early Wednesday mornings though in 1998 showed them as live on the Sunday night.

In Brazil, Rede Record aired the Indy 500 in 1984. From 1985 until 1992, Rede Bandeirantes aired the race and from 1989 onwards, they aired the whole season on TV. Between 1993 and 1994, the CART season was broadcast by Rede Manchete.

Following economical difficulties by the former broadcaster and to battle Rede Globo for the lead of audience, SBT took the rights to transmission from Manchete, including its trio of narrators (Téo José, Luiz Carlos Azenha, and Dedê Gomes), and even sending one of their helicopters to get exclusive images from the races. They broadcast the entire season live between 1995 and 2000, although from 1999 onwards, following complaints by Gugu Liberato because of audience size, the races were delayed and transmitted at 11:00PM, after the Programa Silvio Santos, although a few races remained live, such as Surfers' Paradise (because of the time, which was in the middle of the night) and the Rio 200. From 1997 onwards, the series was referred to as "Fórmula Mundial" (Worldwide Formula), following the split between CART and the Indy Racing League. In the first years, the category was able to challenge Globo and its F1 transmission, but after most of the races were reallocated to VT in the night, the audience stagnated. After the contract expired in 2000, SBT opted to not renew it.

Record once again broadcast the series between 2001 and 2002, again mostly in VTs (with commentary provided by Oscar Ulisses), but the transmissions were delayed to around 7PM, rather than skipping to the end of the night. After an declining audience in 2002, the broadcaster didn't renovated the contract.

In 2003, RedeTV! broadcast the Champ Car series, bringing back commentator Téo José. However, although the races were back on being live, the audience was still rather low and following the decline of the category, they chose to not renew the contact after the end of the 2004 season.

The Globo-owned SporTV channel broadcast the 2004 season to replace the IRL, but following the contract expiring at the end of the season, they didn't renovated, marking the end of the CART/Champ Car broadcasting in Brazil.

In Australia, from 1991 season was shown on Channel 9 in either tape delayed or highlights format during the Wide World Of Sport show.

It then produced and broadcast the Indy Carnival on the Gold Coast from 1991 until 1995.

Channel 10 took over the coverage from 1996 until 2006. The event would be the only race produced and broadcast in widescreen from 2001 to 2008. Though only Australian viewers received either a letterbox or native widescreen broadcast, the rest of the world receiving only a 4:3 feed. Due to Champ Car owning the TV cameras for onboard footage from 2006, the onboard cameras were horribly zoomed in to fit the 16:9 frame.

Then Channel 7 gain the rights for season 2007 until the series collapse in 2008. The Indy 300 on the Gold Coast in 2008 (unified Indy Cars at this point, running as a one off non-championship event due to absorbing the previous Champ Car contractual requirements) was produced by Channel 7.

== Champions ==
Season	Driver	Team	Chassis/Engine	Jim Trueman Rookie of the Year
SCCA/CART Citicorp Cup
1979	(United States) Rick Mears	Penske Racing	Penske/Ford-Cosworth	(United States) Bill Alsup
CART PPG Indy Car World Series
1980	(United States) Johnny Rutherford	Chaparral Racing	Chaparral/Ford-Cosworth	(Australia) Dennis Firestone
1981	(United States) Rick Mears	Penske Racing	Penske/Ford-Cosworth	(United States) Bob Lazier
1982	(United States) Rick Mears	Penske Racing	Penske/Ford-Cosworth	(United States) Bobby Rahal
1983	(United States) Al Unser	Penske Racing	Penske/Ford-Cosworth	(Italy) Teo Fabi
1984	(United States) Mario Andretti	Newman/Haas Racing	Lola/Ford-Cosworth	(Colombia) Roberto Guerrero
1985	(United States) Al Unser	Penske Racing	March/Ford-Cosworth	(Netherlands) Arie Luyendyk
1986	(United States) Bobby Rahal	Truesports	March/Ford-Cosworth	(United States) Dominic Dobson
1987	(United States) Bobby Rahal	Truesports	Lola/Ford-Cosworth	(Italy) Fabrizio Barbazza
1988	(United States) Danny Sullivan	Penske Racing	Penske/Ilmor–Chevrolet	(Canada) John Jones
1989	(Brazil) Emerson Fittipaldi	Patrick Racing	Penske/Ilmor–Chevrolet	(Mexico) Bernard Jourdain
1990	(United States) Al Unser Jr.	Galles-Kraco Racing	Lola/Ilmor–Chevrolet	(United States) Eddie Cheever
1991	(United States) Michael Andretti	Newman/Haas Racing	Lola/Ilmor–Chevrolet	(United States) Jeff Andretti
1992	(United States) Bobby Rahal	Rahal/Hogan Racing	Lola/Ilmor–Chevrolet	(Sweden) Stefan Johansson
1993	(United Kingdom) Nigel Mansell	Newman/Haas Racing	Lola/Cosworth–Ford	(United Kingdom) Nigel Mansell
1994	(United States) Al Unser Jr.	Penske Racing	Penske/Ilmor	(Canada) Jacques Villeneuve
1995	(Canada) Jacques Villeneuve	Team Green Racing	Reynard/Cosworth–Ford	(Brazil) Gil de Ferran
1996	(United States) Jimmy Vasser	Chip Ganassi Racing	Reynard/Honda	(Italy) Alex Zanardi
PPG CART World Series
1997	(Italy) Alex Zanardi	Chip Ganassi Racing	Reynard/Honda	(Canada) Patrick Carpentier
CART FedEx Championship Series
1998	(Italy) Alex Zanardi	Chip Ganassi Racing	Reynard/Honda	(Brazil) Tony Kanaan
1999	(Colombia) Juan Pablo Montoya	Chip Ganassi Racing	Reynard/Honda	(Colombia) Juan Pablo Montoya
2000	(Brazil) Gil de Ferran	Penske Racing	Reynard/Honda	(Sweden) Kenny Bräck
2001	(Brazil) Gil de Ferran	Penske Racing	Reynard/Honda	(New Zealand) Scott Dixon
2002	(Brazil) Cristiano da Matta	Newman/Haas Racing	Lola/Toyota	(Mexico) Mario Domínguez
Bridgestone Presents the Champ Car World Series Powered by Ford
2003	(Canada) Paul Tracy	Player's/Forsythe Racing	Lola/Cosworth–Ford	(France) Sébastien Bourdais

=== By team ===
Team	Championships	Last
(United States) Penske Racing	9	2001
(United States) Newman/Haas Racing	4	2002
(United States) Chip Ganassi Racing	4	1999
(United States) Truesports	2	1987
(United States) Chaparral Racing	1	1980
(United States) Galles-Kraco Racing	1	1990
(United States) Team Green Racing	1	1995
(United States) Rahal/Hogan	1	1992
(United States) Patrick Racing	1	1989
(United States) Player's/Forsythe Racing	1	2003

== Fatalities ==
Four drivers died in CART-sanctioned events:

- Jim Hickman – (August 1, 1982), Tony Bettenhausen 200, Milwaukee Mile, practice.
- Jeff Krosnoff – (July 14, 1996), Molson Indy Toronto, Exhibition Place, 3 laps from finish.
- Gonzalo Rodríguez – (September 11, 1999), Honda Grand Prix of Monterey, Laguna Seca Raceway, practice.
- Greg Moore – (October 31, 1999), Marlboro 500, California Speedway, lap 10.

== See also ==
- IndyCar Series
- List of Champ Car circuits
- List of Champ Car drivers
- List of Champ Car fatal accidents
- List of Champ Car pole positions
- List of Champ Car teams
- List of Champ Car winners
- List of American Championship Car Rookie of the Year Winners
- List of American Championship car racing point scoring systems
