= List of Champ Car teams =

This is a list of all teams that contested the Champ Car World Series between its founding in 1979 to its demise in 2007.

== 2007 Teams ==
This is a list of teams that contested the Champ Car World Series in 2007, the series' final year of operation. All teams utilized Panoz DP01 chassis and Cosworth engines.

Team	Number	Sponsor(s)	Driver(s)	Listed Owner(s)
Conquest Racing	34	Juniper Property Development Group	(France) Nelson Philippe	(Belgium) Éric Bachelart
Dale Coyne Racing	11; 19	Sonny's	(United Kingdom) Katherine Legge (Brazil) Bruno Junqueira	(United States) Dale Coyne
Forsythe Championship Racing	3; 7	Indeck	(Canada) Paul Tracy (Mexico) David Martínez	(United States) Gerald Forsythe
Minardi Team USA	4; 14	Ticketmaster; Muermans Group/MediaMall	(United Kingdom) Dan Clarke (Netherlands) Robert Doornbos	(Australia) Paul Stoddart (United Kingdom) Keith Wiggins
Newman/Haas/Lanigan Racing	1; 2	McDonald's; MediZone	(France) Sébastien Bourdais (United States) Graham Rahal	(United States) Paul Newman (United States) Carl Haas (United States) Mike Lanigan
Pacific Coast Motorsports	28; 29	Imperial Capital Bank	(Mexico) Mario Domínguez (United States) Alex Figge	(United States) Tom Figge
PKV Racing	21; 22	Red Bull; Pay By Touch	(Switzerland) Neel Jani (France) Tristan Gommendy	(United States) Dan Pettit (Australia) Kevin Kalkhoven (United States) Jimmy Vasser
RSPORTS	8; 9	Lexington Energy Services; CDW	(Canada) Alex Tagliani (United Kingdom) Justin Wilson	(United States) Paul Gentilozzi (United States) Dan Pettit
Team Australia	5; 15	Aussie Vineyards	(Australia) Will Power (France) Simon Pagenaud	(United Kingdom) Derrick Walker (Australia) Craig Gore (Australia) John Fish

== List of Champ Car Teams ==
Key: Races Entered = Number of individual races entered; Races Started = Number of individual races started; Drivers = Number of drivers; Total Entries = Total number of race entries; Poles. = Number of pole positions; Podiums. = Number of podium finishes

Team	Seasons	RE	RS	D	TE	W	Pol	Pod	Best Result	First race	First win	Last win	Last race
A. J. Foyt Enterprises	1979-1995	161	158	27	200	0	0	44	2nd (Multiple)	1979 Indianapolis 500	n/a	n/a	1995 Laguna Seca
All American Racers	1979-1981; 1983-1986; 1996-1999	134	131	19	197	1	1	6	1st	1979 Phoenix	1981 Milwaukee		1999 Fontana
Alsup Racing	1979-1984	57	48	3	64	0	0	2	3rd (Multiple)	1979 Phoenix	n/a	n/a	1984 Sanair
AMI Racing	1979-1985	20	18	12	45	0	0	2	3rd (Multiple)	1979 Indianapolis 500	n/a	n/a	1985 Cleveland
Andale Racing	1988-1990	17	16	3	19	0	0	0	6th (1988 Miami)	1988 Laguna Seca	n/a	n/a	1990 Indianapolis 500
Arciero Racing	1982-1994; 2000-2001	213	203	26	233	0	0	2	2nd (1983 Cleveland)	1982 Riverside	n/a	n/a	2001 Fontana
Arciero-Wells Racing	1995-1999	88	87	6	143	0	1	0	4th (1999 Nazareth)	1995 Miami	n/a	n/a	1999 Fontana
Arizona Motorsports	1994-1995	2	0	4	4	0	0	0	DNQ	1994 Indianapolis 500	n/a	n/a	1995 Indianapolis 500
Team Australia	2005-2007	40	40	5	84	2	6	10	1st (Multiple)	2005 Long Beach	2007 Las Vegas	2007 Toronto	2007 Mexico City
Autosport Racing Team	1995	1	0	1	1	0	0	0	DNQ	1995 Indianapolis 500	n/a	n/a	1995 Indianapolis 500
Bayside Motorsport	1989-1991	36	36	2	36	0	0	0	7th (Multiple)	1989 Phoenix	n/a	n/a	1991 Laguna Seca
BCV Racing	1982; 1984	3	2	3	3	0	0	0	9th (1984 Long Beach)	1982 Phoenix	n/a	n/a	1984 Indianapolis 500
Bear Concrete	1984	1	0	1	1	0	0	0	DNQ	1984 Indianapolis 500	n/a	n/a	1984 Indianapolis 500
Beaudoin Racing	1979-1981	10	9	1	10	0	0	0	8th (1981 Milwaukee)	1979 Indianapolis 500	n/a	n/a	1981 Milwaukee II
Beck Motorsports	1995	1	1	1	1	0	0	0	15th (1995 Indianapolis 500)	1995 Indianapolis 500	n/a	n/a	1995 Indianapolis 500
Beith Racing	1979	2	1	1	2	0	0	0	19th (1979 Ontario)	1979 Indianapolis 500	n/a	n/a	1979 Ontario 500
Bettenhausen Racing	1986-2001	243	224	20	248	0	0	7	2nd (Multiple)	1986 Indianapolis 500	n/a	n/a	2001 Fontana
BFM Enterprises	1979-1980	6	3	6	6	0	0	0	9th (1979 Atlanta II)	1979 Indianapolis 500	n/a	n/a	1980 Pocono
Bignotti-Cotter Racing	1981-1984	50	50	5	73	6	2	11	1st (Multiple)	1981 Phoenix	1981 Milwaukee II	1983 Milwaukee	1984 Las Vegas
Bill Freeman Racing	1982	2	2	1	2	0	0	0	9th (1982 Riverside)	1982 Riverside	n/a	n/a	1982 Phoenix II
Bill Tempero	1980-1984	34	25	2	36	0	0	0	6th (1980 Milwaukee II)	1980 Ontario	n/a	n/a	1984 Long Beach
Bob Fletcher Racing	1979-1982	34	32	6	35	0	0	0	4th (Multiple)	1979 Phoenix	n/a	n/a	1982 Pocono
Bob Olmsted	1980	1	0	1	1	0	0	0	DNQ	1980 Indianapolis 500	n/a	n/a	1980 Indianapolis 500
Brayton Racing	1981-1985	46	43	4	54	0	0	0	6th (Multiple)	1981 Phoenix	n/a	n/a	1985 Michigan II
Buddy Boys Racing	1980	1	0	2	2	0	0	0	DNQ	1980 Indianapolis 500	n/a	n/a	1980 Indianapolis 500
Buick Racing	1981; 1983	7	4	1	7	0	0	0	16th (Multiple)	1981 Phoenix	n/a	n/a	1983 Michigan
Burns Racing	1989-1993	5	3	4	6	0	0	0	12th (1992 Indianapolis)	1989 Indianapolis 500	n/a	n/a	1993 Indianapolis 500
C&H Racing	1983	1	0	1	1	0	0	0	DNQ	1983 Indianapolis 500	n/a	n/a	1983 Indianapolis 500
Caliva Racing	1981-1984	13	6	3	15	0	0	0	8th (1981 Michigan)	1981 Atlanta	n/a	n/a	1984 Indianapolis 500
Canadian Tire	1984-1985	24	22	4	26	1	1	2	1st	1984 Long Beach	1985 Road America		1985 Miami
Cannon Racing	1979-1981	20	15	4	21	0	0	0	9th (Multiple)	1979 Indianapolis 500	n/a	n/a	1981 Michigan
Centerline Racing	1982	1	0	1	1	0	0	0	DNQ	1982 Phoenix	n/a	n/a	1982 Phoenix
Chianelli Racing	1985	1	0	1	1	0	0	0	DNQ	1985 Pocono	n/a	n/a	1985 Pocono
Chip Ganassi Racing	1990-2002	229	229	16	421	40	39	91	1st (Multiple)	1990 Phoenix	1994 Surfer's Paradise	2002 Mexico City	
Circle Bar Racing	1982-1985	15	10	1	15	0	0	0	10th (1985 Milwaukee)	1982 Pocono	n/a	n/a	1985 Michigan
Comptech Racing	1994-1996	29	28	1	29	0	1	1	2nd (1996 Long Beach)	1994 Portland	n/a	n/a	1996 Laguna Seca
Conquest Racing	2003-2007	73	73	8	114	0	0	2	2nd (Multiple)	2003 St. Petersburg	n/a	n/a	2007 Mexico City
Team Cotter	1985-1986	32	31	1	32	0	1	3	2nd (Multiple)	1985 Long Beach	n/a	n/a	1986 Miami
Crowers Cams	1979	1	0	1	1	0	0	0	DNQ	1979 Indianapolis 500	n/a	n/a	1979 Indianapolis 500
Curb Motorsports	1984; 1986-1988	45	43	6	63	0	0	3	2nd (Multiple)	1984 Long Beach	n/a	n/a	1988 Nazareth
Dale Coyne Racing	1984-2007	346	304	60	590	0	0	5	2nd (2007 Zolder)	1984 Phoenix	n/a	n/a	2007 Mexico City
David Rogers Racing	1979	1	0	1	1	0	0	0	DNQ	1979 Indianapolis 500	n/a	n/a	1979 Indianapolis 500
Davis Racing	1997-1998	36	36	2	36	0	0	0	7th (1997 Laguna Seca)	1997 Homstead	n/a	n/a	1998 Fontana
Dayton-Walther Racing	1979-1980; 1987-1991	18	12	5	20	0	0	0	5th (1988 Michigan)	1979 Phoenix	n/a	n/a	1991 Indianapolis 500
Della Penna Motorsports	1996-2000	79	78	5	79	0	0	0	5th (1998 Michigan)	1996 Long Beach	n/a	n/a	2000 Fontana
DeLorto-Hansen Racing	1982	2	0	1	2	0	0	0	DNQ	1982 Milwaukee II	n/a	n/a	1982 Road America
Dick Simon Racing	1983-1996	218	210	30	448	0	2	10	2nd (Multiple)	1983 Atlanta	n/a	n/a	1996 Laguna Seca
Dobson Racing	1987-1988	4	3	2	5	0	0	0	18th (Multiple)	1987 Indianapolis 500	n/a	n/a	1988 Laguna Seca
Doug Shierson Racing	1982-1990	136	136	8	153	7	1	24	1st (Multiple)	1982 Phoenix I	1984 Cleveland	1990 Indianapolis 500	1990 Laguna Seca
Douglas Schultz Racing	1983	3	2	1	3	0	0	0	6th (1983 Riverside)	1983 Road America	n/a	n/a	1983 Las Vegas
Dyson Racing	1989	4	4	2	4	0	0	0	11th (1989 Long Beach)	1989 Long Beach	n/a	n/a	1989 Meadowlands
Ed Wachs Motorsport	1984	3	2	1	3	0	0	0	4th (1984 Long Beach)	1984 Long Beach	n/a	n/a	1984 Meadowlands
Ellme Racing	1984	8	1	2	8	0	0	0	29th (1984 Michigan)	1984 Indianapolis 500	n/a	n/a	1984 Las Vegas
Enswick Racing	1989	1	0	2	2	0	0	0	DNQ	1989 Indianapolis 500	n/a	n/a	1989 Indianapolis 500
Euromotorsport	1989-1994	91	80	23	133	0	0	0	4th (1993 Detroit)	1989 Phoenix	n/a	n/a	1994 Laguna Seca
Fernández Racing	2001-2003	57	56	4	98	1	3	5	1st	2001 Monterrey	2003 Portland		2003 Surfer's Paradise
Fittipaldi-Dingman Racing	2003	18	17	1	18	0	0	0	6th (2003 Mexico City)	2003 St. Petersburg	n/a	n/a	2003 Surfer's Paradise
Forsythe Racing	1982-1985; 1995-2007	271	270	21	499	33	35	93	1st (Multiple)	1982 Atlanta	1982 Road America	2007 Cleveland	2007 Mexico City
Forsythe-Green Racing	1994	16	16	1	16	1	0	3	1st	1994 Surfer's Paradise	1994 Road America		1994 Laguna Seca
Frantz Racing	1979-1982	16	10	4	17	0	0	0	9th (1979 Trenton II)	1979 Phoenix	n/a	n/a	1982 Riverside
Galles Racing	1983-1989; 1993-1996	173	173	14	266	9	2	28	1st (Multiple)	1983 Atlanta	1984 Portland	1993 Vancouver	1996 Laguna Seca
Galles-Kraco Racing	1990-1992	52	52	3	104	11	4	44	1st (Multiple)	1990 Phoenix	1990 Long Beach	1992 Indianapolis 500	1992 Laguna Seca
Gary Trout Racing	1988-1989	5	3	3	5	0	0	0	12th (1988 Mid-Ohio)	1988 Indianapolis 500	n/a	n/a	1989 Laguna Seca
Garza Racing	1980-1982	23	22	2	24	0	0	0	4th (1982 Road America)	1980 Phoenix II	n/a	n/a	1982 Phoenix II
Gehlhausen Racing	1979	11	10	5	16	0	0	0	9th (1979 Michigan)	1979 Phoenix	n/a	n/a	1979 Ontario
Genoa Racing	1991	5	4	1	5	0	0	0	14th (1991 Long Beach)	1991 Long Beach	n/a	n/a	1991 Portland
GF Racing	1988	4	0	2	4	0	0	0	DNQ	1988 Mid-Ohio	n/a	n/a	1988 Miami
Gibson Racing	1979	1	0	1	1	0	0	0	DNQ	1979 Indianapolis 500	n/a	n/a	1979 Indianapolis 500
Gohr Racing	1981-1990	102	79	11	103	0	0	0	5th (Multiple)	1981 Milwaukee	n/a	n/a	1990 Michigan
Team Gordon	1999	20	20	1	20	0	0	0	8th (Multiple)	1999 Homestead	n/a	n/a	1999 Fontana
Granatelli Racing Team	1987-1991	76	74	10	83	4	5	12	1st (Multiple)	1987 Long Beach	1987 Phoenix	1991 Nazareth	1991 Laguna Seca
Grant King Racers	1979-1980	8	7	8	13	0	0	0	4th (1980 Mid-Ohio)	1979 Indianapolis 500	n/a	n/a	1980 Phoenix II
Team Green	1995-2002	146	146	6	246	20	17	58	1st (Multiple)	1995 Miami		2002 Rockingham	2002 Mexico City
Greenfield Racing	1990; 1994-1995	10	7	2	10	0	0	0	12th (1990 Meadowlands)	1990 Milwaukee	n/a	n/a	1995 Indianapolis 500
Group 44	1987	4	4	2	4	0	0	0	6th (1987 Long Beach)	1987 Long Beach	n/a	n/a	1987 Miami
GTS Racing	1982-1983	6	3	2	6	0	0	0	18th (1983 Pocono)	1982 Phoenix	n/a	n/a	1983 Pocono
H&H Motorsports	1989	1	0	1	1	0	0	0	DNQ	1989 Indianapolis 500	n/a	n/a	1989 Indianapolis 500
H&R Racing	1981-1984	36	30	8	41	0	0	1	2nd (1981 Michigan)	1981 Milwaukee	n/a	n/a	1984 Laguna Seca
Hall Racing	1979-1982; 1991-1996	148	146	8	150	10	8	25	1st (Multiple)	1979 Phoenix	1979 Phoenix II	1996 Cleveland	1996 Laguna Seca
Hamilton Racing	1981	2	1	1	2	0	0	0	23rd (1981 Riverside)	1981 Riverside	n/a	n/a	1981 Phoenix II
Hayhoe/Cole Racing	1992-1994	40	39	2	40	0	0	1	3rd (1993 Phoenix)	1992 Surfer's Paradise	n/a	n/a	1994 Laguna Seca
HBK Racing	1982-1984	12	7	2	12	0	0	0	5th (1982 Michigan)	1982 Milwaukee	n/a	n/a	1984 Indianapolis 500
Hemelgarn Racing	1985-1995	92	84	22	130	0	0	1	3rd (1987 Phoenix)	1985 Long Beach	n/a	n/a	1995 Indianapolis 500
Hess Racing	1984-1985	16	9	4	16	0	0	0	12th (1985 Indianapolis 500)	1984 Long Beach	n/a	n/a	1985 Miami
Hodgdon Racing	1979-1982	8	6	6	11	0	0	0	4th (1981 Riverside)	1979 Indianapolis 500	n/a	n/a	1982 Phoenix
Hoffman Racing	1979-1980; 1982-1985	29	21	11	41	0	0	0	6th (1979 Atlanta II)	1979 Phoenix	n/a	n/a	1985 Indianapolis 500
Hogan Racing	1996-1999	72	72	7	77	0	2	1	2nd (1999 Gateway)	1996 Homestead	n/a	n/a	1999 Fontana
Hubbard Enterprises	1983	4	0	1	4	0	0	0	DNQ	1983 Cleveland	n/a	n/a	1983 Laguna Seca
Hucul Racing	1979	1	1	1	1	0	0	0	29th (1979 Indianapolis 500)	1979 Indianapolis 500	n/a	n/a	1979 Indianapolis 500
Hurtubise Racing	1979	1	0	1	1	0	0	0	DNQ	1979 Indianapolis 500	n/a	n/a	1979 Indianapolis 500
HVM Racing	2002-2006	78	78	12	120	4	2	14	1st (Multiple)	2002 Monterrey	2002 Surfer's Paradise	2006 Surfer's Paradise	2006 Mexico City
Indy Regency Racing	1993-1994	29	27	3	30	0	0	1	2nd (1994 Michigan)	1993 Indianapolis 500	n/a	n/a	1994 Laguna Seca
Intercomp	1979-1981; 1983	21	15	4	25	0	0	0	11th (Multiple)	1979 Phoenix	n/a	n/a	1983 Indianapolis 500
Interscope Racing	1979-1980; 1982-1985; 1987	48	43	1	48	0	0	2	3rd (Multiple)	1979 Phoenix	n/a	n/a	1987 Miami
J.P. Racing	1986	4	3	1	4	0	0	0	7th (1986 Michigan)	1986 Indianapolis 500	n/a	n/a	1986 Michigan II
Jamieson Racing	1982-1983	11	6	4	12	0	0	0	7th (1982 Phoenix)	1982 Phoenix	n/a	n/a	1983 Phoenix II
Jensen Motorsport	2005	1	1	1	1	0	0	0	16th (2005 Long Beach)	2005 Long Beach	n/a	n/a	2005 Long Beach
Jet Engineering	1981-1984	42	25	9	42	0	0	0	5th (1981 Watkins Glen)	1981 Phoenix	n/a	n/a	1984 Las Vegas
Jerry O'Connell Racing	1979-1981	31	31	4	33	1	0	9	1st	1979 Phoenix	1980 Phoenix II		1981 Milwaukee II
Joe Archuleta Racing	1981	1	0	1	1	0	0	0	DNQ	1981 Phoenix	n/a	n/a	1981 Phoenix
Joe Hunt Racing	1981-1982	8	6	4	9	0	0	0	12th (1982 Atlanta)	1981 Phoenix	n/a	n/a	1982 Phoenix II
Team Johansson	2003	18	18	2	36	1	0	3	1st	2003 St. Petersburg	2003 Surfer's Paradise		
Karl Racing	1979-1981	20	19	1	20	0	0	0	8th (1981 Phoenix)	1979 Indianapolis 500	n/a	n/a	1981 Mexico City
Karl-Nadeau Racing	1983-1985	10	5	2	10	0	0	0	12th (1983 Riverside)	1983 Indianapolis 500	n/a	n/a	1985 Indianapolis 500
Kent Baker Racing	1988-1991	4	2	5	5	0	0	0	8th (1988 Indianapolis 500)	1988 Indianapolis 500	n/a	n/a	1991 Indianapolis 500
King Racing	1988-1989; 1991-1994	40	40	7	47	1	1	1	1st	1988 Indianapolis 500	1994 Michigan		1994 Laguna Seca
Kraco Racing	1981-1989	128	126	9	164	9	6	32	1st (Multiple)	1981 Milwaukee	1986 Long Beach	1989 Meadowlands	1989 Laguna Seca
Larry Hamm Racing	1979	8	8	1	8	0	0	1	2nd (1979 Atlanta)	1979 Phoenix	n/a	n/a	1979 Ontario
Lazier Racing	1989	1	0	1	1	0	0	0	DNQ	1989 Indianapolis 500	n/a	n/a	1989 Indianapolis 500
Leader Card Racing	1979-1994	202	171	28	218	0	0	0	4th (1980 Phoenix II)	1979 Indianapolis 500	n/a	n/a	1994 Laguna Seca
Lindsey Hopkins Racing	1979-1980	7	5	3	9	0	0	0	18th (1980 Indianapolis 500)	1979 Indianapolis 500	n/a	n/a	1980 Michigan II
Longhorn Racing	1979-1982	46	45	3	47	0	2	5	2nd (Multiple)	1979 Phoenix	n/a	n/a	1982 Michigan II
Luxury Racers	1981-1983	16	6	7	17	0	0	0	6th (1982 Road America)	1981 Riverside	n/a	n/a	1983 Las Vegas
Lydia Laughrey Racing	1987	1	1	1	1	0	0	0	25th (1987 Indianapolis 500)	1987 Indianapolis 500	n/a	n/a	1987 Indianapolis 500
M-Group Racing	1986	6	5	1	6	0	0	0	11th (1986 Cleveland)	1986 Long Beach	n/a	n/a	1986 Toronto
M.S. Racing	1988	1	0	2	2	0	0	0	DNQ	1988 Indianapolis 500	n/a	n/a	1988 Indianapolis 500
Mach 1 Racing	1980	5	4	2	5	0	0	0	9th (1980 Indianapolis 500)	1980 Indianapolis 500	n/a	n/a	1980 Milwaukee II
Machinists Union Racing	1980-1989	135	127	22	207	0	0	2	2nd (1986 Michigan)	1980 Indianapolis 500	n/a	n/a	1989 Laguna Seca
Mann Motorsports	1989-1993	8	6	4	10	0	0	0	10th (1992 Indianapolis 500)	1989 Indianapolis 500	n/a	n/a	1993 Indianapolis 500
March Engineering	1986	1	1	2	3	0	0	0	23rd (1986 Indianapolis 500)	1986 Indianapolis 500	n/a	n/a	1986 Indianapolis 500
Mayer Racing	1984	16	16	2	32	3	2	7	1st (Multiple)	1984 Long Beach	1984 Phoenix	1984 Las Vegas	
McCormack Motorsports	1993-1994	22	18	7	26	0	0	0	11th (1993 Phoenix)	1993 Surfer's Paradise	n/a	n/a	1994 Road America
McCray Racing	1982-1984	22	13	6	23	0	0	0	10th (1982 Pocono)	1982 Phoenix	n/a	n/a	1984 Laguna Seca
McElreath Racing	1979-1983	17	12	2	17	0	0	0	6th (1980 Mexico City)	1979 Indianapolis 500	n/a	n/a	1983 Pocono
McLaren	1979	14	14	2	15	2	2	5	1st (Multiple)	1979 Phoenix	1979 Atlanta I	1979 Atlanta II	1979 Phoenix II
Medlin Racing	1979-1980	4	1	3	4	0	0	0	32nd (1980 Pocono)	1979 Indianapolis 500	n/a	n/a	1980 Pocono
Team Menard	1980-1986; 1989-1995	39	33	17	54	0	1	1	3rd (1992 Indianapolis 500)	1980 Ontario	n/a	n/a	1995 Indianapolis 500
Mergard Racing	1979-1981; 1983-1985; 1988	16	10	12	23	0	0	0	7th (1979 Atlanta II)	1979 Atlanta II	n/a	n/a	1988 Indianapolis 500
Metro Racing	1981	3	3	1	3	0	0	0	22nd (1981 Michigan II)	1981 Milwaukee	n/a	n/a	1981 Michigan II
Minardi Team USA	2007	14	14	3	29	2	0	7	1st (Multiple)	2007 Las Vegas	2007 Mont-Tremblant	2007 San Jose	2007 Mexico City
Mo Nunn Racing	2000-2002	59	58	4	78	0	3	3	3rd (Multiple)	2000 Miami	n/a	n/a	2002 Mexico City
Alex Morales Motorsports	1979-1989	151	148	8	152	3	0	4	1st (Multiple)	1979 Phoenix	1981 Michigan	1986 Michigan	1989 Laguna Seca
Team Motorola	2001-2002	40	40	1	40	2	0	9	1st (Multiple)	2001 Monterrey	2001 Toronto	2002 Long Beach	2002 Mexico City
Newman/Haas Racing	1983-2007	408	408	13	726	105	108	246	1st (Multiple)	1983 Atlanta	1983 Road America	2007 Mexico City	
Newman Teamworks	1987	3	3	2	3	0	0	0	7th (1987 Long Beach)	1987 Long Beach	n/a	n/a	1986 Mid-Ohio
NFW Racing	1987	3	1	2	3	0	0	0	21st (1987 Road America)	1987 Road America	n/a	n/a	1987 Miami
Nu-Tech Racing	1990-1993	12	10	5	12	0	0	0	13th (1990 Nazareth)	1990 Detroit	n/a	n/a	1993 Cleveland
Ohio Racing Associates	1981	3	3	2	3	0	0	0	14th (1981 Phoenix II)	1981 Michigan	n/a	n/a	1981 Phoenix II
Pace Racing	1983-1988	35	21	11	40	0	0	0	9th (1985 Pocono)	1983 Indianapolis 500	n/a	n/a	1988 Indianapolis 500
Pacific Coast Motorsports	2007	14	14	4	29	0	0	0	7th (2007 Toronto)	2007 Las Vegas	n/a	n/a	2007 Mexico City
Pacific Coast Racing	1980	8	7	3	10	0	0	0	8th (1980 Ontario 500)	1980 Ontario	n/a	n/a	1980 Ontario 500
Pacific-Summit Racing	1988	2	2	1	2	0	0	0	19th (1988 Laguna Seca)	1988 Mid-Ohio	n/a	n/a	1988 Laguna Seca
PacWest Racing	1993-2002	151	150	10	297	5	4	16	1st (Multiple)	1993 Vancouver	1997 Portland	2001 Nazareth	2002 Motegi
Pagan Racing	1993-1995	5	5	3	5	0	0	0	12th (1995 Indianapolis 500)	1993 Indianapolis 500	n/a	n/a	1995 Indianapolis 500
Patrick Racing	1979-1991; 1995-2003	352	352	31	582	27	22	96	1st (Multiple)	1979 Phoenix		2001 Vancouver	2003 Surfer's Paradise
Team Penske	1979-2001	364	363	21	779	96	121	252	1st (Multiple)	1979 Phoenix	1979 Indianapolis 500	2001 Houston	2001 Fontana
P.I.G. Racing	1990-1993	48	46	4	48	0	0	0	6th (1991 Long Beach)	1990 Long Beach	n/a	n/a	1993 Laguna Seca
PKV Racing	2003-2007	73	73	13	131	1	2	11	1st	2003 St. Petersburg	2005 Portland		2007 Mexico City
Polak Racing	1979	1	1	1	1	0	0	0	24th (1979 Indianapolis 500)	1979 Indianapolis 500	n/a	n/a	1979 Indianapolis 500
Porsche	1987-1990	50	49	4	66	1	3	5	1st	1987 Laguna Seca	1989 Mid-Ohio		1990 Laguna Seca
PPI Motorsports	2000	20	20	2	40	1	0	3	1st	2000 Homestead	2000 Chicago		2000 Fontana
Primus Motor Sports	1983-1984	21	19	3	22	0	0	0	8th (Multiple)	1983 Indianapolis 500	n/a	n/a	1984 Pocono
ProFormance Motorsports	1993-1994	10	9	3	11	0	0	0	7th (Multiple)	1993 Phoenix	n/a	n/a	1994 Indianapolis 500
Project Indy	1994-1998	41	32	11	41	0	0	0	7th (1995 Miami)	1994 Long Beach	n/a	n/a	1998 Long Beach
Protofab Racing	1989	14	14	1	14	0	0	0	10th (Multiple)	1989 Phoenix	n/a	n/a	1989 Laguna Seca
Provimi Racing	1983-1986	56	54	7	69	0	0	1	3rd (1984 Las Vegas)	1983 Atlanta	n/a	n/a	1986 Miami
Purcell Racing	1983-1985	3	1	5	5	0	0	0	12th (1984 Indianapolis 500)	1983 Indianapolis 500	n/a	n/a	1985 Indianapolis 500
Rager Racing	1979-1981	16	12	2	16	0	0	0	8th (Multiple)	1979 Indianapolis 500	n/a	n/a	1981 Phoenix II
Team Rahal	1996-2003	149	149	7	283	12	16	41	1st (Multiple)	1996 Homestead	1998 Laguna Seca	2003 Montreal	2003 Surfer's Paradise
Rahal-Hogan Racing	1992-1995	65	64	3	106	4	3	20	1st (Multiple)	1992 Surfer's Paradise	1992 Phoenix	1992 Nazareth	1995 Laguna Seca
Ram Racing Enterprises	1983	1	0	1	1	0	0	0	DNQ	1983 Indianapolis 500	n/a	n/a	1983 Indianapolis 500
Rasmussen Racing	1979	1	0	1	1	0	0	0	DNQ	1979 Indianapolis 500	n/a	n/a	1979 Indianapolis 500
Rattlesnake Racing	1981-1984	16	11	6	17	0	0	0	7th (1982 Atlanta)	1981 Michigan	n/a	n/a	1984 Indianapolis 500
Raymond Reimer Racing	1979-1980	4	0	4	4	0	0	0	DNQ	1979 Indianapolis 500	n/a	n/a	1980 Mid-Ohio
Raynor Racing	1986-1990	66	65	6	69	0	0	1	3rd (1987 Milwaukee)	1986 Meadowlands	n/a	n/a	1990 Laguna Seca
Rhoades Competition	1979-1983	22	19	8	24	0	0	0	5th (Multiple)	1979 Indianapolis 500	n/a	n/a	1983 Indianapolis 500
Riley & Scott	1994	1	0	1	1	0	0	0	DNQ	1994 Indianapolis 500	n/a	n/a	1994 Indianapolis 500
Robco Racing	1992	9	9	1	9	0	0	0	10th (1992 Toronto)	1992 Long Beach	n/a	n/a	1992 Laguna Saca
Rocketsports Racing	2003-2007	63	63	11	97	1	2	7	1st	2003 St. Petersburg	2004 Road America		2007 Mexico City
Ross Davis Racing	1980-1981	13	9	3	14	0	0	0	13th (1980 Mid-Ohio)	1980 Ontario	n/a	n/a	1981 Phoenix II
Royal Motor Racing	1988	1	0	1	1	0	0	0	DNQ	1988 Indianapolis 500	n/a	n/a	1988 Indianapolis 500
RSPORTS	2007	10	10	2	20	0	2	3	2nd (Multiple)	2007 Las Vegas	n/a	n/a	2007 Road America
RuSPORT	2004-2007	45	45	5	84	4	5	23	1st (Multiple)	2004 Long Beach	2005 Toronto	2007 Assen	2007 Mexico City
S&M Racing	1979	10	9	2	10	0	0	0	8th (1979 Watkins Glen)	1979 Phoenix	n/a	n/a	1979 Phoenix II
Saleen	1989	9	7	2	10	0	0	0	12th (1989 Toronto)	1989 Phoenix	n/a	n/a	1989 Laguna Seca
Sandy Racing	1987	1	0	1	1	0	0	0	DNQ	1987 Indianapolis 500	n/a	n/a	1987 Indianapolis 500
Sanett Racing	1979-1980	3	3	1	3	0	0	0	8th (1980 Ontario)	1979 Ontario 500	n/a	n/a	1980 Indianapolis 500
Scheid Racing	1988	1	0	1	1	0	0	0	DNQ	1988 Indianapolis 500	n/a	n/a	1988 Indianapolis 500
Sigma Autosport	2001-2002	25	25	2	25	0	0	2	3rd (Multiple)	2001 Monterrey	n/a	n/a	2002 Laguna Seca
Stanton Racing	1980	2	1	2	3	0	0	0	11th (1980 Ontario)	1980 Ontario	n/a	n/a	1980 Indianapolis 500
Stoops Racing	1989-1990	6	3	4	6	0	0	0	10th (1989 Michigan)	1989 Indianapolis 500	n/a	n/a	1990 Michigan
Tasman Motorsports	1995-1998	69	69	4	105	4	2	8	1st (Multiple)	1995 Miami	1995 New Hampshire	1996 Michigan	1998 Fontana
Truesports	1982-1992	168	167	6	172	19	12	45	1st (Multiple)	1982 Phoenix	1982 Cleveland	1988 Pocono	1992 Laguna Seca
TEAMKAR	1989-1990; 1992	18	16	4	18	0	0	0	13th (1989 Phoenix)	1989 Phoenix	n/a	n/a	1992 Indianapolis 500
Theodore Racing	1984-1985	4	2	2	4	0	0	0	25th (1985 Portland)	1984 Long Beach	n/a	n/a	1985 Portland
Thunder Racing	1979	2	1	2	2	0	0	0	18th (1979 Ontario 500)	1979 Indianapolis 500	n/a	n/a	1979 Ontario 500
Timberwood Racers	1983-1984	2	0	2	2	0	0	0	DNQ	1983 Indianapolis 500	n/a	n/a	1984 Indianapolis 500
Two's Company Worldwide	1989	1	0	1	1	0	0	0	DNQ	1989 Indianapolis 500	n/a	n/a	1989 Indianapolis 500
U.S. Engineering	1989-1991	17	14	4	17	0	0	0	10th (1990 Cleveland)	1989	n/a	n/a	1991 Long Beach
UNO Racing	1991	17	17	1	17	0	0	0	7th (Multiple)	1991 Surfer's Paradise	n/a	n/a	1991 Laguna Seca
Team VDS	1983-1984	15	13	2	16	1	1	4	1st	1983 Atlanta	1983 Michigan		1984 Indianapolis 500
Vern Schuppan Racing	1981	4	4	1	4	0	0	0	15th (1981 Phoenix II)	1981 Michigan	n/a	n/a	1981 Phoenix II
Vetco Racing	1980-1981	2	0	1	2	0	0	0	DNQ	1980 Milwaukee	n/a	n/a	1981 Milwaukee
Vollstedt Enterprises	1979-1983	14	12	7	18	0	0	0	7th (1980 Milwaukee II)	1979 Indianapolis 500	n/a	n/a	1983 Indianapolis 500
Walker Racing	1991-2004	244	244	28	381	4	10	26	1st (Multiple)	1991 Indianapolis 500	1992 Michigan	1999 Portland	2004 Mexico City
Whittington Bros. Racing	1979-1983	9	9	2	11	0	0	0	12th (1979 Ontario 500)	1979 Ontario 500	n/a	n/a	1983 Pocono
WIT Racing	1984	5	5	3	5	0	0	0	5th (1984 Long Beach)	1984 Long Beach	n/a	n/a	1984 Meadowlands
Woodward Racing	1979-1980	10	8	8	12	0	0	0	7th (1980 Milwaukee)	1979 Indianapolis 500	n/a	n/a	1980 Phoenix II
Wysard Racing	1979-1985	53	45	12	56	0	0	0	4th (1985 Long Beach)	1979 Phoenix	n/a	n/a	1985 Miami
Team	Seasons	RE	RS	D	TE	W	Pol	Pod	Best Result	First race	First win	Last win	Last race

== See also ==
- List of Champ Car circuits
- List of Champ Car drivers
- List of fatal Champ Car accidents
- List of Champ Car pole positions
- List of Champ Car winners
- List of IndyCar Series teams
