= List of Champ Car circuits =

This is a list of circuits which hosted CART/Champ Car racing from 1979 to 2007. For actual Indycar series circuits see List of IndyCar Series racetracks.

Champ Car events were held on 54 different circuits. Phoenix International Raceway hosted the inaugural CART Series race, the 1979 Arizona Republic / Jimmy Bryan 150, and Autódromo Hermanos Rodríguez held the final Champ Car race, the 2007 Gran Premio Tecate. Champ Car events were run on 21 ovals, twelve permanent road courses, and 21 temporary street circuits with 38 tracks located in the United States and 16 abroad.

== Circuits ==
- The "Map" column shows a diagram of the circuit configuration.

Icon	Legend	Note
O	Oval/Speedway	An oval-shaped permanent racing facility. Tracks of one mile or less are short tracks; tracks of two miles or more are superspeedways.
R	Road course	A permanent racetrack that features both left and right turns. A combined road course is a racing facility that features a road course that incorporates part of an oval track.
S	Street circuit	A temporary circuit composed of temporarily closed-off public roads or airport runways.

Circuit	Type	Length and Layout	Direction	Location	Map	Seasons	Races^{1}
Atlanta International Raceway (ATL)	O	1.522 mi (2.449 km) paved oval	Counter-clockwise	(United States) Hampton, Georgia; 33°23′1″N 84°19′4″W	Atlanta	1979, 1981–1983	7
Autódromo Hermanos Rodríguez (AHR)	R	2.774 mi (4.464 km) paved road course	Clockwise	Mexico City; 19°24′15″N 99°5′19″W	Mexico City	1980–1981, 2002–2007	8
Brands Hatch (BRH)	R	1.200 mi (1.931 km) paved road course	Clockwise	(United Kingdom) Swanley, Kent; 51°21′25″N 0°15′47″E	Brands Hatch	2003	1
California Speedway (CAL)	O	2.029 mi (3.265 km) paved oval	Counter-clockwise	(United States) Fontana, California; 34°5′19″N 117°30′0″W	California	1997–2002	6
Chicago Motor Speedway (CHI)	O	1.029 mi (1.656 km) paved oval	Counter-clockwise	(United States) Cicero, Illinois; 41°49′50″N 87°44′55″W	Chicago	1999–2002	4
Circuit Gilles Villeneuve (CGV)	R	2.709 mi (4.360 km) paved road course	Clockwise	(Canada) Montreal, Quebec; 45°30′21″N 73°31′36″W	Montreal	2002–2006	5
Circuit Mont-Tremblant (CMT)	R	2.621 mi (4.218 km) paved road course	Clockwise	(Canada) Mont-Tremblant, Quebec; 46°11′16″N 74°36′36″W	Mont-Tremblant	2007	1
Cleveland Burke Lakefront Airport (CLE)	S	2.480 mi (3.991 km) concrete airfield circuit	Clockwise	(United States) Cleveland, Ohio; 41°31′2″N 81°40′59″W	Cleveland	1982–1989	26
Cleveland Burke Lakefront Airport (CLE)	S	2.369 mi (3.813 km) concrete airfield circuit	Clockwise	(United States) Cleveland, Ohio; 41°31′2″N 81°40′59″W	Cleveland	1990–1996	26
Cleveland Burke Lakefront Airport (CLE)	S	2.106 mi (3.389 km) concrete airfield circuit	Clockwise	(United States) Cleveland, Ohio; 41°31′2″N 81°40′59″W	Cleveland	1997–2007	26
Denver street circuit (Civic Center) (DEN)	S	1.901 mi (3.059 km) paved street circuit	Clockwise	(United States) Denver, Colorado; 39°44′21″N 104°59′22″W	Denver (Civic Center)	1990–1991	2
Denver street circuit (Pepsi Center) (DEN)	S	1.657 mi (2.667 km) paved street circuit	Counter-clockwise	(United States) Denver, Colorado; 39°44′48″N 105°0′23″W	Denver (Pepsi Center)	2002–2006	5
Detroit Raceway at Belle Isle Park (BEL)	S	2.101 mi (3.381 km) paved street circuit	Clockwise	(United States) Detroit, Michigan; 42°20′10″N 82°59′44″W	Detroit (Belle Isle Park)	1992–1997	10
Detroit Raceway at Belle Isle Park (BEL)	S	2.347 mi (3.777 km) paved street circuit	Clockwise	(United States) Detroit, Michigan; 42°20′10″N 82°59′44″W	Detroit (Belle Isle Park)	1998–2001	10
Detroit Street Circuit (Downtown) (DET)	S	2.500 mi (4.023 km) paved street circuit	Clockwise	(United States) Detroit, Michigan; 42°19′47″N 83°2′24″W	Detroit (Downtown)	1989–1991	3
Edmonton City Centre Airport (EDM)	S	1.973 mi (3.175 km) paved airfield / street circuit	Clockwise	(Canada) Edmonton, Alberta; 53°34′32″N 113°31′23″W	Edmonton	2005–2007	3
Emerson Fittipaldi Speedway (EFS)	O	1.864 mi (3.000 km) paved oval	Counter-clockwise	(Brazil) Rio de Janeiro, Rio de Janeiro; 22°58′32″S 43°23′42″W	Rio	1996–2000	5
EuroSpeedway Lausitz (LAU)	O	2.023 mi (3.256 km) paved oval	Counter-clockwise	(Germany) Klettwitz, Brandenburg; 51°32′0″N 13°55′10″E	Lausitz	2001, 2003	2
Gateway International Raceway (GTW)	O	1.250 mi (2.012 km) paved oval	Counter-clockwise	(United States) Madison, Illinois; 38°39′3″N 90°8′7″W	Gateway	1997–2000	4
Homestead–Miami Speedway (HOM)	O	1.527 mi (2.457 km) paved oval	Counter-clockwise	(United States) Homestead, Florida; 25°27′6″N 80°24′31″W	Homestead–Miami	1996	5
Homestead–Miami Speedway (HOM)	O	1.517 mi (2.441 km) paved oval	Counter-clockwise	(United States) Homestead, Florida; 25°27′6″N 80°24′31″W	Homestead–Miami	1997	5
Homestead–Miami Speedway (HOM)	O	1.502 mi (2.417 km) paved oval	Counter-clockwise	(United States) Homestead, Florida; 25°27′6″N 80°24′31″W	Homestead–Miami	1998–2000	5
Houston Street Circuit (Downtown) (HOU)	S	1.527 mi (2.457 km) paved street circuit	Counter-clockwise	(United States) Houston, Texas; 29°45′10″N 95°21′34″W	Houston Downtown	1998–2001	4
Houston Street Circuit (Reliant Park) (HOU)	S	1.700 mi (2.736 km) paved street circuit	Counter-clockwise	(United States) Houston, Texas; 29°40′56″N 95°24′31″W	Houston (Reliant Park)	2006–2007	2
Indianapolis Motor Speedway (IMS)	O	2.500 mi (4.023 km) paved oval	Counter-clockwise	(United States) Speedway, Indiana; 39°47′54″N 86°13′58″W	Indianapolis	1979–1980, 1983–1995	15
Laguna Seca Raceway^{6} (LAG)	R	1.900 mi (3.058 km) paved road course	Counter-clockwise	(United States) Monterey, California; 36°35′05″N 121°45′10″W	Laguna Seca	1983–1987	22
Laguna Seca Raceway^{6} (LAG)	R	2.238 mi (3.602 km) paved road course	Counter-clockwise	(United States) Monterey, California; 36°35′05″N 121°45′10″W	Laguna Seca	1988–2004	22
Las Vegas Motor Speedway (LVS)	O	1.500 mi (2.414 km) paved oval	Counter-clockwise	(United States) Las Vegas, Nevada; 36°16′17″N 115°0′40″W	Las Vegas	2004–2005	2
Las Vegas Street Circuit (Caesars Palace) (LAS)	S	1.125 mi (1.811 km) paved street circuit	Counter-clockwise	(United States) Las Vegas, Nevada; 36°07′1″N 115°10′30″W	Las Vegas (Caesars Palace)	1983–1984	2
Las Vegas Street Circuit (Downtown) (LAS)	S	2.440 mi (3.927 km) paved street circuit	Counter-clockwise	(United States) Las Vegas, Nevada; 36°10′11″N 115°8′55″W	Las Vegas (Downtown)	2007	1
Long Beach Street Circuit (LBH)	S	1.670 mi (2.688 km) paved street circuit: 1984–1991	Clockwise	(United States) Long Beach, California; 33°45′59″N 118°11′34″W	Long Beach	1984–2007	24
Long Beach Street Circuit (LBH)	S	1.586 mi (2.552 km) paved street circuit: 1992–1998	Clockwise	(United States) Long Beach, California; 33°45′59″N 118°11′34″W	Long Beach	1984–2007	24
Long Beach Street Circuit (LBH)	S	1.824 mi (2.935 km) paved street circuit: 1999	Clockwise	(United States) Long Beach, California; 33°45′59″N 118°11′34″W	Long Beach	1984–2007	24
Long Beach Street Circuit (LBH)	S	1.969 mi (3.169 km) paved street circuit: 2000–2007	Clockwise	(United States) Long Beach, California; 33°45′59″N 118°11′34″W	Long Beach	1984–2007	24
Meadowlands Sports Complex (MEA)	S	1.683 mi (2.709 km) paved street circuit: 1984–1987	Counter-clockwise	(United States) East Rutherford, New Jersey; 40°48′51″N 74°04′26″W	Meadowlands	1984–1991	8
Meadowlands Sports Complex (MEA)	S	1.217 mi (1.959 km) paved street circuit: 1988–1991	Counter-clockwise	(United States) East Rutherford, New Jersey; 40°48′51″N 74°04′26″W	Meadowlands	1984–1991	8
Miami Street Circuit (Bayfront Park) (BAY)	S	1.388 mi (2.234 km) paved street circuit: 2002	Counter-clockwise	(United States) Miami, Florida; 25°46′30″N 80°11′10″W	Bayfront	2002–2003	2
Miami Street Circuit (Bayfront Park) (BAY)	S	1.150 mi (1.851 km) paved street circuit: 2003	Counter-clockwise	(United States) Miami, Florida; 25°46′30″N 80°11′10″W	Bayfront	2002–2003	2
Miami Street Circuit (Bicentennial Park) (BIC)	S	1.873 mi (3.014 km) paved street circuit	Clockwise	(United States) Miami, Florida; 25°47′2″N 80°11′13″W	1995 Bicentennial Park street circuit	1995	1
Miami Street Circuit (Tamiami Park)^{6} (TAM)	S	1.784 mi (2.871 km) paved street circuit	Clockwise	(United States) University Park, Florida; 25°44′59″N 80°22′45″W	Miami (Tamiami Park)	1985–1988	4
Michigan International Speedway (MIS)	O	2.000 mi (3.219 km) paved oval	Counter-clockwise	(United States) Brooklyn, Michigan; 42°03′59″N 84°14′29″W	Michigan	1979–2001	33
Mid-Ohio Sports Car Course (MOH)	R	2.400 mi (3.862 km) paved road course	Clockwise	(United States) Lexington, Ohio; 40°41′21″N 82°38′11″W	Mid-Ohio	1980, 1983–2003	22
Milwaukee Mile (MIL)	O	1.032 mi (1.661 km) paved oval	Counter-clockwise	(United States) West Allis, Wisconsin; 43°1′7″N 88°0′37″W	Milwaukee	1980–2006	30
Monterrey Street Circuit (MTY)	S	2.105 mi (3.388 km) paved street circuit	Counter-clockwise	(Mexico) Monterrey, Nuevo León; 25°40′41″N 100°17′00″W	Monterrey	2001–2006	6
Nazareth Speedway^{6} (NAZ)	O	0.946 mi (1.522 km) paved oval	Counter-clockwise	(United States) Nazareth, Pennsylvania; 40°43′37″N 75°19′14″W	Nazareth	1987–2001	15
New Hampshire International Speedway (NHS)	O	1.058 mi (1.703 km) paved oval	Counter-clockwise	(United States) Loudon, New Hampshire; 43°21′44″N 71°27′41″W	New Hampshire	1992–1995	4
Ontario Motor Speedway (ONT)	O	2.500 mi (4.023 km) paved oval	Counter-clockwise	(United States) Ontario, California; 34°4′20″N 117°34′2″W	Ontario	1979–1980	3
Phoenix International Raceway (PHX)	O	1.000 mi (1.609 km) paved oval	Counter-clockwise	(United States) Avondale, Arizona; 33°22′29″N 112°18′40″W	Phoenix	1979–1995	22
Pocono International Raceway (POC)	O	2.500 mi (4.023 km) paved oval	Counter-clockwise	(United States) Long Pond, Pennsylvania; 41°3′19″N 75°30′41″W	Pocono	1980, 1982–1989	9
Portland International Raceway (PIR)	R	1.967 mi (3.166 km) paved road course	Clockwise	(United States) Portland, Oregon; 45°35′49″N 122°41′45″W	Portland	1984–2007	24
Riverside International Raceway (RIV)	R	3.251 mi (5.232 km) paved road course	Clockwise	(United States) Riverside, California; 33°56′13″N 117°16′21″W	Riverside	1981–1983	3
Road America (ROA)	R	4.048 mi (6.515 km) paved road course	Clockwise	(United States) Elkhart Lake, Wisconsin; 43°48′0″N 87°59′13″W	Road America	1982–2004, 2006–2007	25
Rockingham Motor Speedway (RMS)	O	1.479 mi (2.380 km) paved oval	Counter-clockwise	(United Kingdom) North Northamptonshire, Northamptonshire; 52°30′54″N 0°39′27″W	Rockingham	2001–2002	2
St. Petersburg Street Circuit (STP)	S	1.800 mi (2.897 km) paved airfield / street circuit	Clockwise	(United States) St. Petersburg, Florida; 27°45′59″N 82°37′45″W	St. Petersburg	2003	1
San Jose Street Circuit (SAJ)	S	1.448 mi (2.330 km) paved street circuit	Clockwise	(United States) San Jose, California; 37°19′41″N 121°53′26″W	San Jose	2005–2007	3
Sanair Super Speedway (SAN)	O	0.826 mi (1.329 km) paved oval	Counter-clockwise	(Canada) Saint-Pie, Quebec; 45°31′45″N 72°53′1″W	Sanair	1984–1986	3
Surfers Paradise Street Circuit (SUR)	S	2.790 mi (4.490 km) paved street circuit	Counter-clockwise	(Australia) Surfers Paradise, Queensland; 27°59′18″S 153°25′42″E	Surfers Paradise	1991–2007	17
Texas Motor Speedway (TMS)	O	1.482 mi (2.385 km) paved oval	Counter-clockwise	(United States) Fort Worth, Texas; 33°2′13″N 97°16′59″W	Texas	2001	0^{5}
Toronto Street Circuit (TOR)	S	1.780 mi (2.865 km) paved street circuit: 1986–1996	Clockwise	(Canada) Toronto, Ontario; 43°37′58″N 79°24′58″W	Toronto	1986–2007	22
Toronto Street Circuit (TOR)	S	1.721 mi (2.770 km) paved street circuit: 1997–1999	Clockwise	(Canada) Toronto, Ontario; 43°37′58″N 79°24′58″W	Toronto	1986–2007	22
Toronto Street Circuit (TOR)	S	1.755 mi (2.824 km) paved street circuit: 2000–2007	Clockwise	(Canada) Toronto, Ontario; 43°37′58″N 79°24′58″W	Toronto	1986–2007	22
Trenton International Speedway (TRE)	O	1.500 mi (2.414 km) paved oval	Counter-clockwise	(United States) Trenton, New Jersey; 40°14′21″N 74°43′16″W	Trenton	1979	3
TT Circuit Assen (ASS)	R	2.830 mi (4.554 km) paved road course	Clockwise	(Netherlands) Assen, Drenthe; 52°57′42″N 6°31′24″E	Assen	2007	1
Twin Ring Motegi (MOT)	O	1.549 mi (2.493 km) paved oval	Counter-clockwise	(Japan) Motegi, Tochigi; 36°32′1″N 140°13′39″E	Motegi	1998–2002	5
Vancouver Street Circuit (VAN)	S	1.648 mi (2.652 km) paved street circuit: 1990–1993	Clockwise	(Canada) Vancouver, British Columbia; 49°16′35″N 123°6′25″W	Vancouver	1990–2004	15
Vancouver Street Circuit (VAN)	S	1.703 mi (2.741 km) paved street circuit: 1994–1997	Clockwise	(Canada) Vancouver, British Columbia; 49°16′35″N 123°6′25″W	Vancouver	1990–2004	15
Vancouver Street Circuit (VAN)	S	1.781 mi (2.866 km) paved street circuit: 1998–2004	Clockwise	(Canada) Vancouver, British Columbia; 49°16′35″N 123°6′25″W	Vancouver	1990–2004	15
Watkins Glen (WGL)	R	3.377 mi (5.435 km) paved road course	Clockwise	(United States) Watkins Glen, New York; 42°20′13″N 76°55′38″W	Watkins Glen	1979–1981	3
Circuit Zolder (ZOL)	R	2.622 mi (4.220 km) paved road course	Clockwise	(Belgium) Heusden-Zolder, Limburg; 50°59′20″N 5°15′20″E	Zolder	2007	1

== Timeline ==
1979	1980	1981	1982	1983	1984	1985	1986	1987	1988	1989	1990	1991	1992	1993	1994	1995	1996	1997	1998	1999	2000	2001	2002	2003	2004	2005	2006	2007
Ovals
Atlanta		Atlanta																										
																		California										
																				Chicago								
																	Rio											
																						Lausitz		Lausitz				
																		Gateway										
																	Homestead–Miami											
Indianapolis				Indianapolis																								
																									Las Vegas			
Michigan																												
	Milwaukee																											
																			Motegi									
								Nazareth																				
													New Hampshire															
Ontario																												
Phoenix																												
	Pocono		Pocono																									
																						Rockingham						
					Sanair																							
																						Texas^{8}						
Trenton																												
Road Courses
																												Assen
																								Brands Hatch				
																							Montreal					
	Mexico City																						Mexico City					
				Laguna Seca																								
	Mid-Ohio			Mid-Ohio																								
																												Mont-Trem- blant
					Portland																							
		Riverside																										
			Road America																								Road America	
Watkins Glen																												
																												Zolder
Street Circuits
			Cleveland																									
											Denver (Civic Center)																	
																							Denver (Pepsi Center)					
													Detroit (Belle Isle Park)															
										Detroit (Downtown)																		
																										Edmonton		
																			Houston (Downtown)									
																											Houston (Reliant Park)	
				Las Vegas (Caesars Palace)																								
																												Las Vegas (Down- town)
					Long Beach																							
					Meadowlands																							
																							Miami (Bayfront Park)					
																Miami (Bicent- ennial Park)												
						Miami (Tamiami Park)																						
																						Monterrey						
																								St. Pete				
																										San Jose		
												Surfers Paradise																
							Toronto																					
											Vancouver																	

== Notes ==
1. Only points-paying races are included. In case of two races being part of the same event (held on one weekend), each of them is counted separately.
2. These tracks at Denver were street circuits so the same abbreviation is used.
3. These tracks at Houston were street circuits so the same abbreviation is used.
4. These tracks at Las Vegas were street circuits so the same abbreviation is used.
5. The 2001 Firestone Firehawk 600 at Texas Motor Speedway was canceled after qualifying for driver safety concerns.
6. Each of these circuits twice hosted the Marlboro Challenge, the only non-championship event staged by CART.

== See also ==
- List of Champ Car drivers
- List of fatal Champ Car accidents
- List of Champ Car pole positions
- List of Champ Car teams
- List of Champ Car winners
