= List of Champ Car drivers =

This list of Champ Car drivers covers drivers listed across four eras of American championship car racing: the AAA era (1902–1955), the USAC era (1956–1978), the CART era (1979–2003), and the Champ Car World Series (CCWS) era (2004–2007). For each driver, the tables record nationality, seasons, championship titles, races and starts, pole positions, wins, podiums and points.

== Drivers ==
=== AAA era (1902–1955) ===
Name	Nation	Seasons	Championship titles	Races (Starts)	Poles	Wins	Podiums	Points
George Abell	United States	1927	0	1	0	0	0	5
Art Adair	United States	1939	0	1	0	0	0	0
Bert Adams	United States	1911	0	1 (0)	0	0	0	0
F. L. Adams	United States	1913	0	1 (0)	0	0	0	0
George Adams	United States	1916	0	5 (3)	0	0	0	55
Joe Adas	United States	1950	0	1 (0)	0	0	0	0
Walt Adaer	United States	1946-1950	0	41 (33)	0	5	18	1230
Fred Agabashian	United States	1947-1955	0	28 (25)	2	1	1	2065.7
Frank Agan	United States	1911	0	1	0	0	0	0
Emil Agarz	United States	1916	0	2 (1)	0	0	0	0
A. C. Aiken	United States	1932	0	1 (0)	0	0	0	0
George Ainslee	United States	1912	0	1	0	0	0	0
Johnny Aitken	United States	1909-1911, 1915-1916	0	24 (23)	1	8	12	4155
Pietro Alberti	United States	1939	0	1	0	0	0	0
Bill Albertson	United States	1922, 1928-1930	0	4 (2)	0	0	0	80
Bill Aldridge	United States	1915	0	1 (0)	0	0	0	0
H. F. Alexander	United States	1919	0	1 (0)	0	0	0	0
W. Alexander	United States	1913	0	1	0	0	0	0
George Armstrong	United States	1909	0	1	0	0	0	0
Billy Arnold	United States	1928-1932	1 (1930)	17	4	3	4	1203.5
Charlie Arnold	United States	1909	0	2	0	1	0	135
Henry Banks	United States	1935-1954	1 (1950)	58 (43)	1	1	9	4019.1
Charles Basle	United States	1909-1911, 1921	0	10 (9)	0	0	0	70
Fred Belcher	United States	1909-1911	0	4	0	0	0	60
Harry Bell	United States	1909	0	1	0	0	0	0
Erwin Bergdoll	United States	1909, 1911-1915	0	11 (8)	0	1	4	980
Louis Bergdoll	United States	1909	0	1	0	0	0	0
Maurice Bernin	France	1905	0	1	0	0	1	1
Tony Bettenhausen	United States	1941-1955	1 (1951)	79 (68)	12	19	25	7286.3
Fred Betz	United States	1909, 1911	0	2	1	0	1	0
Charles Bigelow	United States	1909, 1911	0	6 (4)	2	1	1	215
David Bonney	United States	1909	0	1	0	0	0	90
William Bourque	Canada	1909	0	2	0	0	1	420
George Bradbeer	United States	1909	0	1	0	0	0	0
B. Breig	United States	1909	0	1	0	0	0	0
Harold Brinker	United States	1909, 1917	0	2 (1)	0	0	1	320
Jimmy Bryan	United States	1951-1955	1 (1954)	38 (35)	1	12	19	5171.4
Bob Burman	United States	1909-1916	0	47 (41)	0	6	15	3310
Charles Burman	United States	1905	0	1	0	1	1	4
Bob Carey	United States	1932	1 (1932)	6	1	2	3	815
Emanuel Cedrino	Italy	1905	0	2	0	0	2	4
Arthur Chevrolet	United States	1909	0	1	0	0	0	0
Gaston Chevrolet	United States	1916-1920	1 (1920)	20 (15)	0	4	7	2202
Walter Christie	United States	1905	0	1 (0)	0	0	0	0
Carl Christensen	United States	1909	0	1	0	0	0	0
Sam Christopherson	United States	1909	0	3	1	0	2	140
Jap Clemens	United States	1909-1910	0	5 (4)	0	0	2	320
Harry Cobe	United States	1909, 1911	0	4	0	0	0	40
Ralph Coburn	United States	1905	0	1 (0)	0	0	0	0
John Coffey	United States	1909	0	2	1	0	0	0
Harry Cohen	United States	1909-1910	0	3	0	0	2	95
Earl Cooper	United States	1911-1927	3 (1913, 1915, 1917)	94 (89)	5	21	39	13785
Thomas Costello	United States	1909, 1912	0	3	0	0	2	180
Howard Covey	United States	1909	0	2	0	1	1	100
J. A. Crowell	United States	1905	0	1 (0)	0	0	0	0
Bill Cummings	United States	1930-1938	1 (1934)	36 (35)	10	6	15	3397.9
George Dade	United States	1909	0	1	0	0	0	0
Harry Davis	United States	1909	0	1	0	0	0	0
H. A. De Vaux	France	1909	0	1 (0)	0	0	0	0
Tobin DeHymel	United States	1909-1910	0	3 (2)	0	0	0	25
Al Denison	United States	1909	0	2 (1)	0	0	0	0
Ralph DePalma	United States	1909-1933	2 (1912, 1914)	117 (100)	9	25	37	11875
Pete DePaolo	United States	1922-1931, 1934	2 (1925, 1927)	62 (55)	5	10	21	6480
George DeWitt	United States	1909	0	4 (2)	0	0	1	110
Bert Dingley	United States	1909-1912, 1914	0	19 (17)	1	3	10	1938
Louis Disbrow	United States	1909-1915	0	20 (19)	0	4	8	1730
Martin Dooley	United States	1909	0	1	0	0	0	0
Joe Downey	United States	1909	0	2 (1)	0	0	0	0
Robert Drach	United States	1909-1910	0	4	1	0	0	20
George Draper	United States	1905	0	1 (0)	0	0	0	0
Harmon Droge	United States	1909	0	1	0	0	1	60
Chris Dundee	United States	1909	0	1	0	0	0	0
Frank Durbin	United States	1905	0	1	0	0	1	1
Fred Ellis	United States	1909-1911	0	5 (4)	0	0	0	0
C. A. Englebeck	United States	1909	0	1	0	0	0	70
Jack Finch	United States	1909	0	1	0	0	1	60
Jack Fleming	United States	1909-1911	0	5	0	1	3	840
Harry Fletcher	United States	1905	0	1 (0)	0	0	0	0
Martin Fletcher	United States	1909	0	1	0	0	0	90
James Florida	United States	1909	0	2	0	0	0	80
Frank Free	United States	1909	0	2	0	0	1	80
Frank Gelnaw	United States	1909-1911	0	8 (6)	0	1	1	450
Elmer Gerald	United States	1909	0	1 (0)	0	0	0	0
Howard Gill	United States	1909	0	2 (1)	0	0	0	0
Harry Grant	United States	1909-1915	0	27 (23)	2	2	4	2170
Arthur Greiner	United States	1909-1911	0	7 (4)	0	0	1	290
Robert Greer	United States	1909	0	1	0	0	0	40
Joseph Grinnon	United States	1909	0	1	1	0	0	0
Al Hall	United States	1909	0	1 (0)	0	0	0	0
Elbert J. Hall	United States	1909	0	1	0	0	0	0
Howard Hall	United States	1909, 1911	0	2	0	0	0	0
Ralph Hamlin	United States	1909	0	2	0	0	0	30
Sam Hanks	United States	1939-1955	1 (1953)	59 (41)	1	3	14	4569.4
Harris Hanshue	United States	1909	0	10 (9)	2	1	3	900
Hugh Harding	United States	1909-1910	0	3	0	0	1	123
Harry Harkness	United States	1915	0	1 (0)	0	0	0	0
Charles Harris	United States	1909	0	1	0	0	0	0
H. O. Harrison	United States	1909	0	1 (0)	0	0	0	0
R. P. Harrison	United States	1909	0	1	0	0	0	0
W. Harrison	United States	1909	0	2 (1)	0	0	0	0
Ray Harroun	United States	1909-1911	1 (1910)	18 (17)	0	4	9	2510
Harry Hartz	United States	1921-1927	1 (1926)	76 (74)	3	7	39	8593
L. B. Harvey	United States	1909	0	1	0	0	0	0
Willie Haupt	United States	1909, 1911, 1913-1915, 1919-1920	0	13 (11)	0	0	1	155
E. O. Hayes	United States	1909	0	1	0	0	0	0
Eddie Hearne	United States	1909-1928	1 (1923)	113 (106)	2	11	43	8190
Victor Hémery	France	1911	0	1	0	0	0	0
William Hilliard	United States	1905	0	1 (0)	0	0	0	0
Ted Horn	United States	1934-1948	3 (1946, 1947, 1948)	78 (72)	7	24	49	10093
Charles Howard	United States	1909	0	1	0	0	0	15
Elmer Huber	United States	1909	0	1	0	0	0	0
Hughie Hughes	United Kingdom	1909, 1911-1915	0	37 (28)	1	4	12	2820
Guy Irwin	United States	1909	0	1	0	0	0	0
Webb Jay	United States	1905	0	4	0	1	3	7
Bruce Keen	United States	1909, 1911	0	2	0	1	2	440
Tom Kincade	United States	1909-1910	0	8	0	2	3	695
C. O. King	United States	1909, 1911	0	2 (1)	1	0	0	0
Earl Kiser	United States	1905	0	1 (0)	0	0	0	0
Willie Knipper	United States	1909-1915	0	10 (9)	0	1	3	575
Elmer Knox	United States	1909, 1913	0	3	1	0	0	55
Bert Latham	United States	1909	0	1	0	0	0	140
Malin Leinau	United States	1909	0	1	0	0	0	0
Frank Lescault	United States	1909	0	1	0	1	1	400
W. C. Longstreth	United States	1909	0	1 (0)	0	0	0	0
Harry Lord	United States	1909	0	1	0	0	0	0
Lee Lorimer	United States	1909	0	3	1	0	0	0
Charles Lund	United States	1909	0	1	0	0	1	210
Leigh Lynch	United States	1909-1910	0	4 (3)	0	1	3	770
Herbert Lytle	United States	1905, 1909-1911	0	9 (8)	0	1	3	312
Alvin Maisonville	United States	1909-1911	0	3	1	0	0	45
Morris Martin	United States	1909	0	1	0	0	0	0
E. Linn Mathewson	United States	1909	0	1 (0)	0	0	0	0
Joe Matson	United States	1909-1912	0	7	0	1	1	535
Rex Mays	United States	1934-1941, 1946-1949	2 (1940, 1941)	61 (57)	20	8	11	5988.7
William McCulla	United States	1909	0	1	0	0	0	0
Clarence McKeague	United States	1909, 1911	0	2	0	0	0	30
Eaton McMillan	United States	1909	0	1	0	1	1	600
L. G. Mecklem	United States	1909	0	1	0	0	0	0
Charlie Merz	United States	1909-1913, 1916	0	20 (18)	1	3	10	2390
Louis Meyer	United States	1926-1939	3 (1928, 1929, 1933)	37 (33)	0	8	11	5503.9
Harry Michener	United States	1909, 1911	0	2	0	0	1	170
Bert Miller	United States	1909	0	3 (1)	1	0	0	80
Major Miller	United States	1905	0	1 (0)	0	0	0	0
Tommy Milton	United States	1916-1927	1 (1922)	107 (102)	5	20	50	11213
Ralph Mulford	United States	1910-1922, 1924, 1926	2 (1911, 1918)	97 (87)	2	19	42	8228
Jimmy Murphy	United States	1919-1924	2 (1922, 1924)	54 (52)	7	17	32	8495
Barney Oldfield	United States	1905, 1909-1918	1 (1905)	57 (48)	5	7	16	3142
Johnnie Parsons	United States	1948-1955	1 (1949)	73 (55)	1	11	20	6266.2
Kelly Petillo	United States	1928, 1932-1941	1 (1935)	27 (21)	2	4	4	1448
Dario Resta	United Kingdom	1915-1919, 1921, 1923	1 (1916)	38 (34)	3	10	18	7583
Floyd Roberts	United States	1934-1939	1 (1938)	11 (8)	2	1	3	1656.2
Montague Roberts	United States	1905, 1909	0	4 (1)	0	0	1	2
George Robertson	United States	1909-1910	1 (1909)	6 (5)	0	2	4	1570
Mauri Rose	United States	1932-1941, 1946-1951	1 (1936)	41 (36)	1	6	14	5918
Paul Sartori	Italy	1905	0	2 (0)	0	0	0	0
Louis Schneider	United States	1927-1933	1 (1931)	22 (17)	0	1	2	712.5
Wilbur Shaw	United States	1927-1941	2 (1937, 1939)	43 (38)	1	6	12	6442
Lewis Strang	United States	1909-1911	0	13 (12)	2	1	2	580
Chuck Stevenson	United States	1949-1954	1 (1952)	47 (42)	3	4	12	4468.5
Bob Sweikert	United States	1950-1955	1 (1955)	41 (34)	6	4	13	3680
Guy Vaughan	United States	1905	0	3 (2)	0	1	2	5
Bill Vukovich	United States	1950-1955	0	30 (22)	3	4	6	2881.8
Howdy Wilcox	United States	1910-1916, 1919-1923	1 (1919)	41 (36)	3	4	10	3203
Frank Wridgeway	United States	1905	0	1	0	0	1	1
Dan Wurgis	United States	1905	0	5 (4)	0	0	3	6

=== USAC era (1956–1978) ===
Name	Nation	Seasons	Championship titles	Races (Starts)	Poles	Wins	Podiums	Points
Jay Abney	United States	1956	0	1 (0)	0	0	0	0
Carl Adams	United States	1970	0	1 (0)	0	0	0	0
Jim Adams	United States	1966	0	1 (0)	0	0	0	0
Tony Adamowicz	United States	1956	0	3 (0)	0	0	0	0
Fred Agabashian	United States	1956-1958	0	4 (3)	0	0	0	50
Gary Allbritain	United States	1976	0	3 (0)	0	0	0	0
Wally Dallenbach Sr.	United States	1965-1978	0	184 (166)	1	5	26	20921
Mark Donohue	United States	1968-1973	0	32 (29)	4	3	7	5200
A. J. Foyt	United States	1957-1978	6 (1961, 1962, 1964, 1965, 1967, 1975)	281 (262)	47	56	102	40689
Janet Guthrie	United States	1976-1978	0	12 (8)	0	0	0	0
Parnelli Jones	United States	1960-1967, 1972	0	67 (59)	12	6	17	6783
Gordon Johncock	United States	1964-1978	1 (1976)	200 (187)	15	19	60	28610
Joe Leonard	United States	1964-1975	2 (1971, 1972)	110 (98)	2	6	19	13838
Roger McCluskey	United States	1964-1975	1 (1973)	247 (223)	3	4	29	20437
Jim Rathmann	United States	1956-1963	0	33 (26)	1	3	6	4684.8
Eddie Sachs	United States	1956-1964	0	76 (61)	4	8	19	6307
Bobby Unser	United States	1956-1978	2 (1968, 1974)	230 (220)	37	24	62	38049
Rodger Ward	United States	1956-1966	2 (1959, 1962)	118 (109)	11	24	45	15600

=== CART era (1979–2003) ===
Name	Nation	Seasons	Championship titles	Races (Starts)	Poles	Wins	Podiums	Points
Kenny Acheson	United Kingdom	1984	0	3 (1)	0	0	0	0
Bobby Adkins	United States	1981	0	1 (0)	0	0	0	0
Mark Alderson	United States	1982	0	1 (0)	0	0	0	0
Bill Alsup	United States	1979-1984	0	65 (58)	0	0	3	1859
Jeff Andretti	United States	1990-1994	0	23 (21)	0	0	0	26
John Andretti	United States	1987-1994	0	73	0	1	2	26
Michael Andretti	United States	1983-2002	1 (1991)	317	32	42	99	2488
Mario Andretti	United States	1979-1994	1 (1984)	208	29	19	63	2847
Éric Bachelart	Belgium	1992-1993, 1995	0	26 (24)	0	0	0	19
Tom Bagley	United States	1979-1980	0	25 (24)	0	0	0	2002
Fabrizio Barbazza	Italy	1987, 1989, 1992	0	27 (25)	0	0	1	49
Alex Barron	United States	1998-2001	0	36 (34)	0	0	0	16
Gary Bettenhausen	United States	1979-1994, 1996	0	53 (45)	0	0	2	1255
Tony Bettenhausen Jr.	United States	1979-1993	0	128 (113)	0	0	1	280
Mark Blundell	United Kingdom	1996-2000	0	80	0	3	5	219
Raul Boesel	Brazil	1985-1999	0	172 (171)	3	0	5	730
Scott Brayton	United States	1981-1995	0	152 (147)	2	0	1	306
Kenny Bräck	Sweden	2000-2002	0	59	7	5	13	445
Phil Caliva	United States	1979-1984	0	19 (10)	0	0	0	107
Patrick Carpentier	Canada	1997-2003	0	128 (127)	4	4	17	610
Dana Carter	United States	1979-1980	0	2 (0)	0	0	0	0
Pancho Carter	United States	1979-1992, 1994	0	120 (116)	1	1	5	2697
Hélio Castroneves	Brazil	1998-2001	0	79	7	6	10	354
Eddie Cheever	United States	1986, 1990-1995	0	82	0	0	4	70
Kevin Cogan	United States	1981-1991, 1993	0	117 (116)	0	1	7	448
Dale Coyne	United States	1984-1989, 1991	0	67 (34)	0	0	0	3
Wally Dallenbach Jr.	United States	1987, 1990	0	4	0	0	0	3
Derek Daly	Ireland	1982-1989	0	67 (66)	0	0	1	147
Luis Diaz	Mexico	2002-2003	0	2	0	0	0	0
Scott Dixon	New Zealand	2001-2002	0	39	0	1	3	195
Fredrik Ekblom	Sweden	1994-1996	0	3	0	0	0	0
Teo Fabi	Italy	1983-1984, 1988-1990, 1992-1996	0	119 (118)	9	5	12	613
Juan Manuel Fangio II	Argentina	1995-1997	0	37	0	0	0	20
Adrián Fernández	Mexico	1993-2003	0	180	3	8	21	878
Gil de Ferran	Brazil	1995-2001	2 (2000, 2001)	129	16	7	34	864
Christian Fittipaldi	Brazil	1995-2002	0	129	1	2	20	671
Emerson Fittipaldi	Brazil	1984-1996	1 (1989)	196 (195)	16	22	43	1508
Stan Fox	United States	1984-1995	0	21 (13)	0	0	0	11
Dario Franchitti	United Kingdom	1997-2002	0	114	11	10	32	727
Tom Frantz	United States	1979-1982	0	15 (9)	0	0	0	236
Chip Ganassi	United States	1981-1986	0	27 (25)	0	0	3	90
Josele Garza	Mexico	1980-1987	0	91 (88)	0	0	1	274
Spike Gehlhausen	United States	1979-1988	0	39 (31)	0	0	3	1067
Memo Gidley	United States	1999-2001	0	36	0	0	3	89
Scott Goodyear	Canada	1987-1996	0	98 (97)	2	2	6	340
Robby Gordon	United States	1992-1999	0	108 (106)	4	2	9	393
Marco Greco	Brazil	1993-1996	0	46 (40)	0	0	0	7
Mike Groff	United States	1990-1996	0	60 (54)	0	0	0	69
Carlos Guerrero	Mexico	1995-1996	0	17	0	0	0	2
Roberto Guerrero	Colombia	1984-1995	0	123 (118)	6	2	8	390
Maurício Gugelmin	Brazil	1993-2001	0	148 (147)	4	1	9	453
Janet Guthrie	United States	1979-1980	0	3 (1)	0	0	0	0
Bob Harkey	United States	1979-1980, 1982-1983	0	7 (1)	0	0	0	0
Scott Harrington	United States	1989	0	3 (1)	0	0	0	0
Hurley Haywood	United States	1979-1982	0	7 (5)	0	0	0	26
Richie Hearn	United States	1996-1999	0	59	0	0	0	86
Bill Henderson	United States	1979-1982	0	1 (0)	0	0	0	0
Bryan Herta	United States	1994-2001, 2003	0	122 (121)	7	2	10	436
Cliff Hucul	Canada	1979-1981	0	6	0	0	0	90
Stefan Johansson	Sweden	1992-1996	0	74	0	0	4	250
Gordon Johncock	United States	1979-1985, 1987-1992	0	78 (73)	5	5	15	4194
Parker Johnstone	United States	1994-1997	0	47 (45)	1	0	1	75
Davy Jones	United States	1987, 1989, 1993-1995	0	17 (16)	0	0	0	11
P. J. Jones	United States	1996-1999	0	59 (58)	0	0	1	48
Michel Jourdain	Mexico	1980-1981	0	3 (2)	0	0	0	6
Michel Jourdain Jr.	Mexico	1996-2003	0	139 (138)	1	2	7	361
Tony Kanaan	Brazil	1996-2003	0	95 (93)	4	1	6	393
Sheldon Kinser	United States	1979-1980, 1982	0	14 (12)	0	0	0	697
Steve Krisiloff	United States	1979, 1981, 1983-1984	0	17 (14)	0	0	0	297
Jeff Krosnoff	United States	1996	0	11	0	0	0	0
Lee Kunzman	United States	1979-1980, 1983	0	13 (9)	0	0	1	635
Eddie Lawson	United States	1996	0	11	0	0	0	26
Buddy Lazier	United States	1989-1996	0	73 (55)	0	0	0	17
JJ Lehto	Finland	1998	0	19	0	0	0	25
Al Loquasto	United States	1979-1980, 1982-1984	0	11 (6)	0	0	1	75
Arie Luyendyk	Netherlands	1984-1995, 1997	0	146 (143)	1	3	13	625
Jan Magnussen	Denmark	1996, 1999	0	11	0	0	0	13
Nigel Mansell	United Kingdom	1993-1994	1 (1993)	32 (31)	10	5	13	279
Darren Manning	United Kingdom	2002-2003	0	19	0	0	1	107
Tarso Marques	Brazil	1999-2000	0	24 (23)	0	0	0	15
John Martin	United States	1979-1980	0	8 (6)	0	0	0	56
Hiro Matsushita	Japan	1990-1998	0	124 (117)	0	0	0	37
Jim McElreath	United States	1979-1984	0	19 (13)	0	0	0	249
Graham McRae	New Zealand	1983-1984, 1987	0	6 (2)	0	0	0	0
Casey Mears	United States	2000-2001	0	5	0	0	0	19
Rick Mears	United States	1979-1992	3 (1979, 1981, 1982)	180 (179)	39	26	68	8642
Roger Mears	United States	1979-1984	0	33 (29)	0	0	0	418
Tiago Monteiro	Portugal	2003	0	18 (17)	0	0	0	29
Juan Pablo Montoya	Colombia	1999-2000	1 (1999)	40	14	10	13	338
Greg Moore	Canada	1996-2000	0	72	5	5	18	433
Roberto Moreno	Brazil	1985-1986, 1994-2001, 2003	0	121 (119)	2	2	12	429
Shinji Nakano	Japan	2000-2002	0	57 (56)	0	0	0	66
Danny Ongais	United States	1979-1980, 1982-1987	0	59 (52)	0	0	3	2155
Max Papis	Italy	1996-2000	0	115 (113)	2	3	11	439
Johnny Parsons	United States	1979-1995	0	38 (25)	0	0	0	96
Scott Pruett	United States	1988-1993, 1995-1999	0	147 (145)	5	2	15	687
Bobby Rahal	United States	1982-1998	3 (1986, 1987, 1992)	266 (264)	17	24	88	2320
Willy T. Ribbs	United States	1984-1985, 1990-1994	0	49 (46)	0	0	0	41
André Ribeiro	Brazil	1995-1998	0	69 (68)	2	3	4	172
Larry Rice	United States	1979-1980, 1982	0	8 (5)	0	0	0	105
Tim Richmond	United States	1979-1980	0	10 (8)	0	0	0	321
Gonzalo Rodríguez	Uruguay	1999	0	2 (1)	0	0	0	1
Johnny Rutherford	United States	1979-1992, 1994	1 (1980)	117 (107)	8	10	20	7243
Eliseo Salazar	Chile	1995-1996	0	21 (20)	0	0	0	21
Mika Salo	Finland	2003	0	4	0	0	1	26
Vern Schuppan	Australia	1979-1982	0	22 (19)	0	0	0	1277
Billy Scott	United States	1979	0	2 (1)	0	0	0	20
Dick Simon	United States	1979-1988, 1995	0	90 (78)	0	0	0	295
Tom Sneva	United States	1979-1992	0	130 (127)	4	10	28	4977
George Snider	United States	1979-1983, 1985-1990, 1992	0	15 (12)	0	0	0	30
Danny Sullivan	United States	1982, 1984-1993, 1995	1 (1988)	172 (170)	19	17	40	1156
Lyn St. James	United States	1992-1995	0	12 (11)	0	0	0	2
Toranosuke Takagi	Japan	2001-2002	0	39 (38)	0	0	0	81
Paul Tracy	Canada	1991-2003	1 (2003)	212 (209)	19	26	59	1426
Al Unser	United States	1979-1994	2 (1983, 1985)	117 (113)	4	4	27	3923
Al Unser Jr.	United States	1982-2003	2 (1990, 1994)	275 (273)	7	31	80	2253
Bobby Unser	United States	1979-1981	0	37 (36)	14	10	20	7633
Jimmy Vasser	United States	1992-2003	1 (1996)	205 (204)	8	10	30	1137
Jacques Villeneuve	Canada	1994-1995	1 (1995)	33	6	5	10	266
Bill Vukovich II	United States	1979-1984	0	16 (13)	0	0	0	104
Desiré Wilson	South Africa	1983-1984, 1986	0	14 (11)	0	0	0	3
Alex Yoong	Malaysia	2003	0	4	0	0	0	4
Alessandro Zanardi	Italy	1996-1998, 2001	2 (1997, 1998)	67 (66)	10	15	28	636

=== CCWS (Champ Car World Series) era (2004–2007) ===
Name	Nation	Seasons	Championship titles	Races (Starts)	Poles	Wins	Podiums	Points
A. J. Allmendinger	United States	2004-2006	0	40	2	5	14	741
Sébastien Bourdais	France	2004-2007	4 (2004, 2005, 2006, 2007)	55	27	28	37	1468
Ronnie Bremer	Denmark	2005	0	12	0	0	0	139
Juan Cáceres	Uruguay	2006	0	1	0	0	0	6
Dan Clarke	United Kingdom	2006-2007	0	28 (27)	1	0	3	304
Cristiano da Matta	Brazil	2006-2007	0	22	0	1	2	273
Ryan Dalziel	United Kingdom	2005, 2007	0	12	0	0	0	129
Mario Domínguez	Mexico	2004-2007	0	50	1	0	7	722
Robert Doornbos	Netherlands	2007	0	14	0	2	6	268
Alex Figge	United States	2007	0	14 (13)	0	0	0	95
Timo Glock	Germany	2005	0	13	0	0	1	202
Tristan Gommendy	France	2007	0	12 (11)	1	0	0	140
Mário Haberfeld	Brazil	2004	0	14	0	0	0	157
Matt Halliday	New Zealand	2007	0	3	0	0	0	18
Jan Heylen	Belgium	2006-2007	0	23	0	0	1	244
Ryan Hunter-Reay	United States	2004-2005	0	25	1	1	1	309
Neel Jani	Switzerland	2007	0	14	0	0	3	231
Bruno Junqueira	Brazil	2004-2007	0	45	2	3	18	852
Tõnis Kasemets	Estonia	2006	0	5	0	0	0	34
Rodolfo Lavin	Mexico	2004-2005	0	20	0	0	1	228
Katherine Legge	United Kingdom	2006-2007	0	28	0	0	0	241
Marcus Marshall	Australia	2005	0	12	0	0	0	104
Gastón Mazzacane	Argentina	2004	0	10 (9)	0	0	0	73
Michael McDowell	United States	2005	0	2	0	0	0	19
Simon Pagenaud	France	2004	0	14	0	0	0	232
Nicky Pastorelli	Netherlands	2006	0	9	0	0	0	73
Nelson Philippe	France	2004-2007	0	41	0	1	3	465
Antônio Pizzonia	Brazil	2006	0	4	0	0	0	43
Will Power	Australia	2005-2007	0	30	5	3	7	492
Graham Rahal	United States	2007	0	14	0	0	4	243
Andrew Ranger	Canada	2005-2006	0	27	0	0	1	340
Buddy Rice	United States	2006	0	1	0	0	0	11
Oriol Servià	Spain	2004-2007	0	54	1	1	12	921
Guy Smith	United Kingdom	2004	0	7	0	0	0	53
Ricardo Sperafico	Brazil	2005	0	13	0	0	0	92
Alex Tagliani	Canada	2004-2007	0	56 (55)	0	1	6	835
Paul Tracy	Canada	2004-2007	0	53 (52)	6	5	16	880
Michael Valiante	Canada	2004-2005	0	2	0	0	0	17
Jimmy Vasser	United States	2004-2006	0	29	0	0	3	425
Justin Wilson	United Kingdom	2004-2006	0	54 (53)	7	4	15	1032
Björn Wirdheim	Sweden	2005	0	11	0	0	0	115
Andreas Wirth	Germany	2006	0	2	0	0	0	19
Charles Zwolsman Jr.	Netherlands	2005-2006	0	15	0	0	0	170

== See also ==
- List of Champ Car circuits
- List of fatal Champ Car accidents
- List of Champ Car pole positions
- List of Champ Car teams
- List of Champ Car winners
- List of IndyCar Series drivers
