= List of Champ Car pole positions =

Complete through 2007 Champ Car season.

No.	Driver	Years active	Poles
1	(United States) Rick Mears	1979–1992	39
2	(United States) Michael Andretti	1983–2003	32
3	(United States) Mario Andretti	1979–1994	30
4	(France) Sébastien Bourdais	2003–2007	28
5	(Canada) Paul Tracy	1991–2007	25
6	(United States) Danny Sullivan	1982–1995	19
7	(United States) Bobby Rahal	1982–1998	18
8	(Brazil) Emerson Fittipaldi	1984–1996	17
9	(Brazil) Gil de Ferran	1995–2001	16
10	(Colombia) Juan Pablo Montoya	1999–2000	14
10	(United States) Bobby Unser	1979–1981	14
12	(Scotland) Dario Franchitti	1997–2002	11
13	(Italy) Teo Fabi	1983–1996	10
13	(England) Nigel Mansell	1993–1994	10
13	(Italy) Alex Zanardi	1996–2001	10
16	(Brazil) Bruno Junqueira	2001–2007	9
16	(United States) Jimmy Vasser	1991–2006	9
18	(United States) Johnny Rutherford	1979–1989	8
19	(Sweden) Kenny Bräck	2000–2002	7
19	(Brazil) Hélio Castroneves	1998–2001	7
19	(Brazil) Cristiano da Matta	1999–2006	7
19	(United States) Bryan Herta	1994–2003	7
19	(United States) Al Unser Jr.	1982–1999	7
24	(Colombia) Roberto Guerrero	1984–1995	6
24	(Canada) Jacques Villeneuve	1994–2002	6
26	(Canada) Patrick Carpentier	1997–2004	5
26	(United States) Gordon Johncock	1979–1992	5
26	(Canada) Greg Moore	1996–1999	5
26	(United States) Scott Pruett	1988–1999	5
26	(United Kingdom) Justin Wilson	2004–2007	5
31	(Mexico) Adrián Fernández	1993–2003	4
31	(United States) Robby Gordon	1992–1999	4
31	(Brazil) Maurício Gugelmin	1993–2001	4
31	(Brazil) Tony Kanaan	1998–2002	4
31	(Australia) Will Power	2005–2007	4
31	(United States) Tom Sneva	1979–1992	4
31	(Canada) Alex Tagliani	2000–2007	4
31	(United States) Al Unser	1979–1994	4
39	(Brazil) Raul Boesel	1985–1999	3
40	(United States) A. J. Allmendinger	2004–2006	2
40	(United States) Kevin Cogan	1981–1993	2
40	(Canada) Scott Goodyear	1987–1996	2
40	(Brazil) Roberto Moreno	1985–2007	2
40	(Italy) Max Papis	1996–2003	2
40	(Brazil) Andre Ribeiro	1995–1998	2
46	(Australia) Geoff Brabham	1981–1994	1
46	(United States) Scott Brayton	1981–1995	1
46	(United States) Pancho Carter	1979–1994	1
46	(England) Dan Clarke	2006–2007	1
46	(Mexico) Mario Domínguez	2002–2007	1
46	(Brazil) Christian Fittipaldi	1995–2002	1
46	(France) Tristan Gommendy	2007	1
46	(United States) Ryan Hunter-Reay	2003–2005	1
46	(United States) Parker Johnstone	1994–1997	1
46	(Mexico) Michel Jourdain Jr.	1996–2004	1
46	(Netherlands) Arie Luyendyk	1984–1997	1
46	(United States) John Paul Jr.	1982–1994	1
46	(Spain) Oriol Servia	2002–2007	1
46	(Canada) Jacques Villeneuve Sr.	1982–1992	1

== See also ==
- List of Champ Car circuits
- List of fatal Champ Car accidents
- List of Champ Car drivers
- List of Champ Car teams
- List of Champ Car winners
- List of IndyCar pole positions
