= List of Champ Car winners =

Complete through end of 2007 Champ Car season. For a complete list of winners of all Indy car races, see List of American Championship Car winners.

No.	Driver	Years active	Wins
1	(United States) Michael Andretti	1983–2002	42
2	(United States) Al Unser Jr.	1982–1999	31
2	(Canada) Paul Tracy	1991–2007	31
2	(France) Sébastien Bourdais	2003–2007	31
5	(United States) Rick Mears	1979–1992	26
6	(United States) Bobby Rahal	1982–1998	24
7	(Brazil) Emerson Fittipaldi	1984–1996	23
8	(United States) Mario Andretti	1979–1994	19
9	(United States) Danny Sullivan	1982–1995	17
10	(Italy) Alex Zanardi	1996–2001	15
11	(Brazil) Cristiano da Matta	1999–2006	12
12	(United States) Bobby Unser	1979–1981	11
13	(United States) Johnny Rutherford	1979–1989	10
13	(United States) Tom Sneva	1979–1992	10
13	(United States) Jimmy Vasser	1991–2006	10
13	(Scotland) Dario Franchitti	1997–2002	10
13	(Colombia) Juan Pablo Montoya	1999–2000	10
18	(Brazil) Bruno Junqueira	2001–2007	8
18	(Mexico) Adrián Fernández	1993–2003	8
20	(Brazil) Gil de Ferran	1995–2001	7
21	(United States) Gordon Johncock	1979–1992	6
21	(Brazil) Hélio Castroneves	1998–2001	6
23	(Italy) Teo Fabi	1983–1996	5
23	(England) Nigel Mansell	1993–1994	5
23	(Canada) Jacques Villeneuve	1994–1995	5
23	(Canada) Greg Moore	1996–1999	5
23	(Canada) Patrick Carpentier	1997–2004	5
23	(Sweden) Kenny Bräck	2000–2002	5
23	(United States) A. J. Allmendinger	2004–2006	5
30	(United States) Al Unser	1979–1994	4
30	(United Kingdom) Justin Wilson	2004–2007	4
32	(Netherlands) Arie Luyendyk	1984–1997	3
32	(Brazil) Andre Ribeiro	1995–1998	3
32	(England) Mark Blundell	1996–2000	3
32	(Italy) Max Papis	1996–2003	3
36	(Colombia) Roberto Guerrero	1984–1995	2
36	(Canada) Scott Goodyear	1987–1996	2
36	(United States) Robby Gordon	1992–1999	2
36	(United States) Scott Pruett	1988–1999	2
36	(United States) Bryan Herta	1994–2003	2
36	(Brazil) Christian Fittipaldi	1995–2002	2
36	(Mexico) Michel Jourdain Jr.	1996–2004	2
36	(Mexico) Mario Domínguez	2002–2007	2
36	(United States) Ryan Hunter-Reay	2003–2005	2
36	(Brazil) Roberto Moreno	1985–2007	2
36	(Australia) Will Power	2005–2007	2
36	(Netherlands) Robert Doornbos	2007	2
48	(United States) Mike Mosley	1979–1983	1
48	(United States) Pancho Carter	1979–1994	1
48	(Mexico) Héctor Rebaque	1982	1
48	(United States) John Paul Jr.	1982–1994	1
48	(Canada) Jacques Villeneuve, Sr.	1982–1992	1
48	(United States) Kevin Cogan	1981–1993	1
48	(United States) John Andretti	1988–1994	1
48	(Brazil) Maurício Gugelmin	1993–2001	1
48	(Brazil) Tony Kanaan	1998–2002	1
48	(New Zealand) Scott Dixon	2001–2002	1
48	(Canada) Alex Tagliani	2000–2007	1
48	(Spain) Oriol Servià	2000–2007	1
48	(France) Nelson Philippe	2004–2007	1

== See also ==
- List of Champ Car circuits
- List of Champ Car drivers
- List of fatal Champ Car accidents
- List of Champ Car pole positions
- List of Champ Car teams
