= Justin Wilson (racing driver) =

British racing driver (1978–2015)

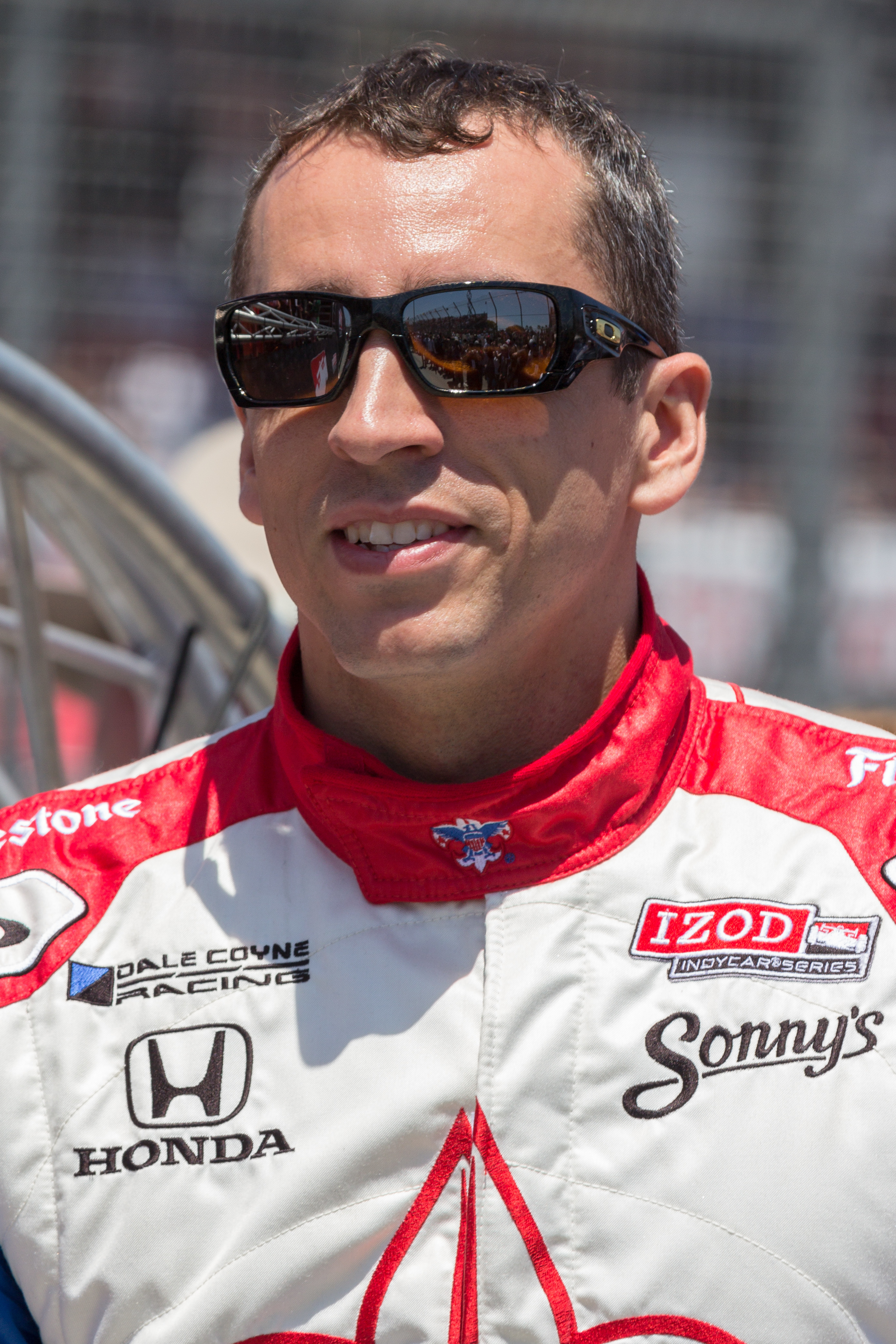
- Wilson at the 2013 Long Beach Grand Prix
- Nationality: (United Kingdom) English
- Born: Justin Boyd Wilson; 31 July 1978 Moorgate, Rotherham, South Yorkshire, England
- Died: 24 August 2015 (aged 37) Lehigh Valley Hospital–Cedar Crest, Allentown, Pennsylvania, U.S.
- Relatives: Stefan Wilson (brother)

IndyCar Series career
- Years active: 2008–2015
- Former teams: Newman/Haas/Lanigan Racing (2008); Dreyer & Reinbold Racing (2010–2011); Dale Coyne Racing (2009, 2012–2014); Andretti Autosport (2015)
- Starts: 120
- Wins: 3
- Poles: 2
- Fastest laps: 2
- Best finish: 6th in 2013

Champ Car World Series
- Years active: 2004–2007
- Teams: Conquest Racing (2004); RuSPORT (2005–2006); RSPORTS (2007)
- Starts: 54
- Wins: 4
- Poles: 6
- Best finish: 2nd in 2006, 2007

Awards
- 2006, 2007 2015: Greg Moore Legacy Award; Indycar Series Most Popular Driver

Formula One World Championship career
- Active years: 2003
- Team(s): Minardi, Jaguar
- Entries: 16
- Championships: 0
- Wins: 0
- Podiums: 0
- Career points: 1
- Pole positions: 0
- Fastest laps: 0
- First entry: 2003 Australian Grand Prix
- Last entry: 2003 Japanese Grand Prix

Justin Boyd Wilson (31 July 1978 – 24 August 2015) was a British professional open-wheel racing driver who competed in Formula One (F1) in 2003, the Champ Car World Series (CCWS) from 2004 to 2007 and the IndyCar Series from 2008 to 2015. He won the first Formula Palmer Audi (FPA) in 1998, the International Formula 3000 Championship (IF3000) with Nordic Racing in 2001, and co-won the 2012 24 Hours of Daytona for Michael Shank Racing.

Wilson began karting at the age of eight and achieved consistent results, before progressing to car racing in the Formula Vauxhall Championship. He won the FPA title and earned a fully funded seat in IF3000, becoming the first British driver to win the series championship in 2001. He moved to the 2002 World Series by Nissan for the Racing Engineering team and finished fourth. Through an investment scheme where the public could purchase shares in Wilson, he drove for the Minardi and Jaguar teams in the 2003 F1 season.

Wilson drove for the Conquest Racing and RuSPORT teams in the CCWS from 2004 to 2007, winning four races and finishing runner-up in the 2006 and 2007 drivers' championships. Wilson went to Newman/Haas/Lanigan Racing for the 2008 IndyCar Series, winning the Detroit Indy Grand Prix. A move to the low-budget Dale Coyne Racing (DCR) team for 2009 resulted in the team's first open-wheel victory at the Grand Prix at the Glen. Wilson moved to the Dreyer & Reinbold Racing squad from 2010 and 2011 but did not win a race. He returned to DCR for 2012 to 2014, winning the 2012 Firestone 550 and finishing sixth in the 2013 drivers' championship.

Late in the 2015 season, in the ABC Supply 500 at Pocono Raceway, Wilson died after debris from a crashed car struck his helmet. He was the first driver to die from injuries sustained in an IndyCar race since Dan Wheldon in 2011. As of 2026, it is also the most recent fatal accident to have occurred in IndyCar. His organs were donated to save the lives of five people. A hairpin corner at Snetterton Circuit was renamed after him and a memorial fund was established to support his children.

== Early and personal life ==
Wilson was born in Moorgate, a suburb of Rotherham, South Yorkshire, on 31 July 1978 to Keith and Lynne Wilson. His father owns a solvents company, a petrol station, and raced Formula Ford cars from the 1960s until a major accident at Oulton Park in 1975 ended his career. Wilson's younger brother, Stefan, is also a racing driver. He grew up in Woodall, South Yorkshire. From 1989 to the completion of General Certificate of Secondary Education (GCSE) examinations in July 1994, Wilson was educated at Sheffield's private Birkdale School.

At the age of eleven, Wilson was tested for dyslexia, a learning disability that affects how a person reads and writes words; the test was negative. Wilson's mother took him to a clinic for a second test two years later and he was formally diagnosed with the condition at the age of thirteen. He struggled at school with the disability and received additional tutoring; Wilson's peers perceived him as inept and unintelligent. He married his partner Julia in 2006 and they have two children, Jane and Jessica. Wilson was the official ambassador for the International Dyslexia Association, and Teen Cancer America.

== Junior career ==
Aged eight in 1987, Wilson sought a hobby and took up karting, refining his ability at the South Yorkshire Kart Club in Wombwell, Barnsley. His father was his chief mechanic, courier and mentor. In 1989, Wilson finished seventh in the Cadet National British Karting Championship, twelfth in the 1991 RACMSA Junior British Championships, improving to fourth in 1992. His father contacted karting expert Terry Fullerton in 1993 and the two met at the Worksop motorway services. Fullerton told him Wilson should cease karting in his category because of his weight, and mentored him in 1994. Wilson finished fifth in the 1994 Formula A British Championship, the United Kingdom's highest-level of kart racing. He was third at Buckmore Park Kart Circuit's Renault GP race.

Wilson progressed to car racing at the age of sixteen, competing in the Formula Vauxhall Junior Winter Series with Team JLR, as preparation for the 1995 Formula Vaxuhall Junior Championship. Wilson won on his series debut at Pembrey Circuit in South Wales' first heat aged sixteen years and two months, and became the first sixteen-year-old to win an official motor race in the United Kingdom. He remained with Team JLR in 1995. Wilson missed the season's first round after breaking both his legs when the brakes on his racing school car failed at Brands Hatch. A pre-season title favourite, he claimed four victories and tied on points in third position with driver Ben Collins. He won the Formula Vauxhall Junior Challenge Cup category limited to 16-year-olds. Wilson won the British Racing Drivers' Club (BRDC) Chris Bristow Trophy as "the most promising driver to race at Silverstone", and was a finalist for the Autosport BRDC Award.

To better his driving ability, Paul Stewart Racing (PSR) manager Andy Pycock selected Wilson to compete for the team in the 1996 championship. PSR were allowed to move his pedals back and alter its shape for better comfort to accommodate Wilson's 6 ft 4 in (1.93 m) frame. He won the season-opening round at Brands Hatch, finished in the top-five in every race and took two pole positions to finish runner-up in the championship. The following year, Wilson fell to fourth overall with three victories and seven podium finishes. For the 1997 EFDA Nations Cup at Donington Park in October, he joined fellow driver Warren Carway at the Diamond Racing-run European Union Team, finishing fourth.

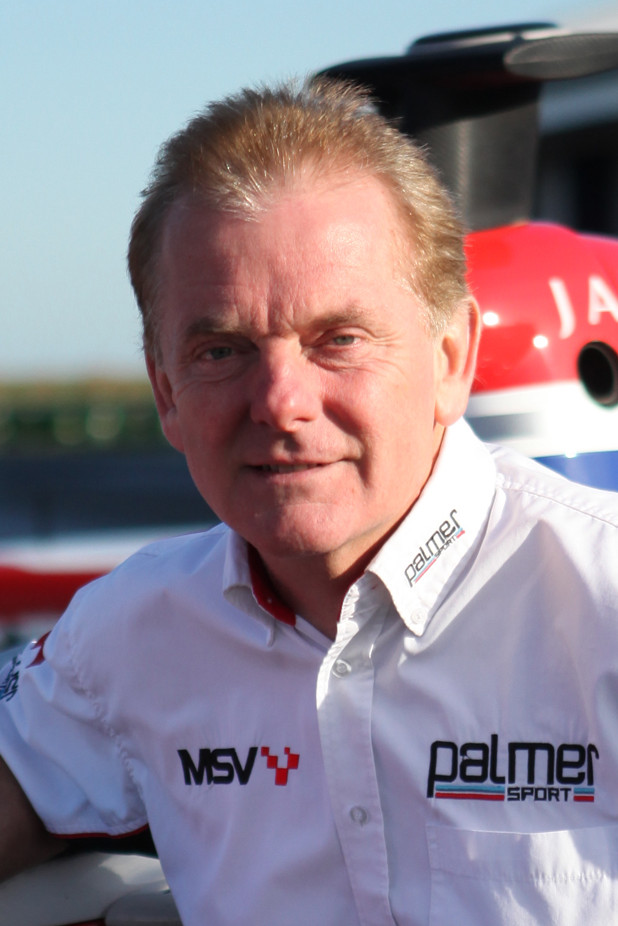
Jonathan Palmer (pictured in 2011) became Wilson's manager after the driver won the Formula Palmer Audi title in 1998.

Wilson's performances impressed the three-time world champion Jackie Stewart and his son Paul. Jackie Stewart concluded Wilson's height would hinder him in single-seaters and advised a move to either sports car or touring car racing. A lack of funding prevented a progression to Formula Three due to its high entry fee. His family wrote to the former driver and commentator Jonathan Palmer for advice. Palmer replied he had established a one-make racing series for drivers seeking a modest financial route to Formula One (F1). Wilson entered Formula Palmer Audi in 1998 and was employed as a driving instructor at Bedford Autodrome. With nine victories and four pole positions, he won the inaugural championship over Darren Turner, and was again shortlisted for the Autosport BRDC Award.

Wilson's title victory earned him a fully funded seat in the International Formula 3000 Championship (IF3000)—F1's feeder series—with Team Astromega for the 1999 season, and Palmer became his manager. He worked to better his engineering skills and relationship with the media. During the season, in which Palmer obtained sponsorship for Wilson from Benetton Formula, he qualified for every race and was several times the highest-placed rookie. He took two points and was 20th in the drivers' standings.

Wilson's driving ability attracted Nordic Racing's attention, and they signed him for the 2000 season. He established a rapport with team owners Chris and Derek Mower, and results improved from 1999, finishing fifth overall with two podiums and five points finishes. He returned to Nordic Racing for the 2001 season, after negotiations with Arden International in late 2000 fell through because of his tall height. Wilson won three times—at Autódromo José Carlos Pace, the A1-Ring and the Hungaroring— and achieving ten podium finishes and scoring 71 points, to become the first British driver to claim the championship. Wilson won by a series-record 32 points over Mark Webber, and the BRDC Gold Medal, the ERA Club Trophy and the Graham Hill Trophy for winning the title.

At first, F1 teams were not interested in Wilson, but tested for the Jordan squad at Silverstone in September 2001, and had a seat fitting at McLaren. Jordan did not employ Wilson to race in the 2002 season due to financial issues, signing the 2001 British Formula Three champion Takuma Sato. Wilson considered going to Championship Auto Racing Teams (CART), and spoke to the Minardi team before it selected Webber; he did not return to IF3000. For 2002, he drove in the inaugural World Series by Nissan. The Racing Engineering team chose Wilson, and he accepted. He won races at Autódromo José Carlos Pace and the Circuit Ricardo Tormo and achieved six more podium finishes for fourth in the points standings.

== Formula One career ==
=== Minardi (first-half of 2003) ===
When Minardi driver Alex Yoong was rested for two races due to poor performance, Wilson was the team's preferred choice to replace him. However, during a seat fitting at Minardi's headquarters in Faenza, Italy, he was unable to fit inside the PS02 car because of his long legs and so Anthony Davidson drove the car instead. Wilson and his manager Jonathan Palmer were eager to arrange a test with the Newman/Haas Racing CART team in September 2002, and Wilson had a seat fitting in a Lola-Toyota car at their Chicago workshop, becoming acquainted with staff members. Wilson made his oval track test debut at Homestead–Miami Speedway on 8 October. He declined Newman/Haas' invitation for a second test at Sebring International Raceway in December.

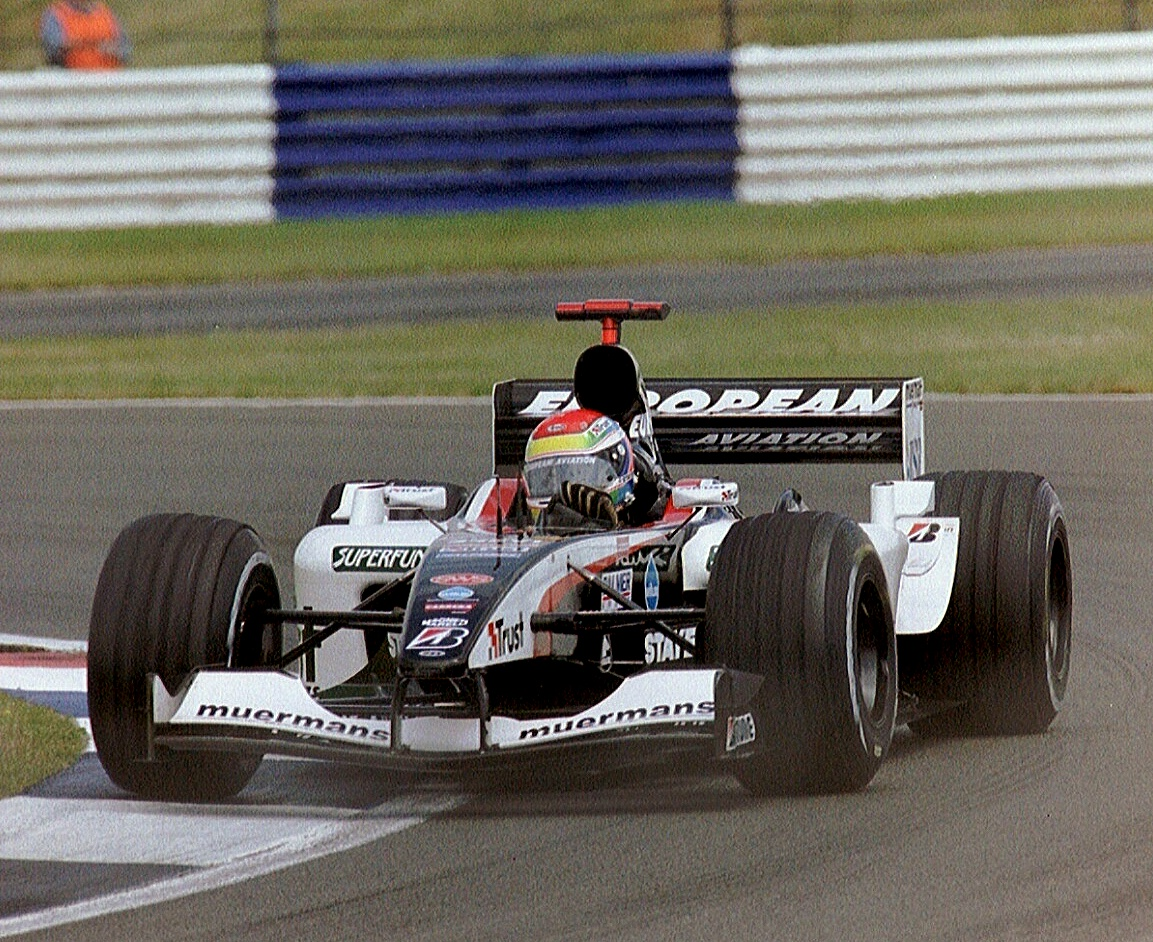
Wilson driving for Minardi at the 2003 British Grand Prix

Wilson discussed driving for Minardi in 2003 with its owner Paul Stoddart, who was keen to have him replace the outgoing Jaguar-bound Mark Webber. He was told to gather £2 million in sponsorship funding to race for Minardi. The capital was raised through Palmer searching for financial partners, whilst Wilson's father mortgaged the family home. With the provision of him bringing the agreed financial settlement, Minardi designed the PS03 car to accommodate Wilson's large frame; the seat was lowered to keep his knees away from his chin and moved its pedals forward. He visited Faenza in late November and had no difficulty entering and exiting a mocked-up version of the car. Wilson signed a three-year driving contract with Minardi a month later.

It emerged Wilson had not obtained the necessary sponsorship money to pay for his seat at Minardi and his father was close to selling his petrol station. Palmer spent most of January and February 2003 holding meetings with lawyers to develop a programme allowing investors to support Wilson's career by buying shares in him. This would allow them to raise £1.2 million required for Wilson to drive for Minardi in the season's first two rounds. The investment was floated on the London Stock Exchange from 5 March to 31 May, making Wilson the first racing driver to be listed on it. A total of 900 people invested a minimum of £500, with 10 per cent of Wilson's earnings paid to them until 31 December 2012. (Note: Murray Walker, the motor racing commentator, promoted the investment and bought shares in it.)

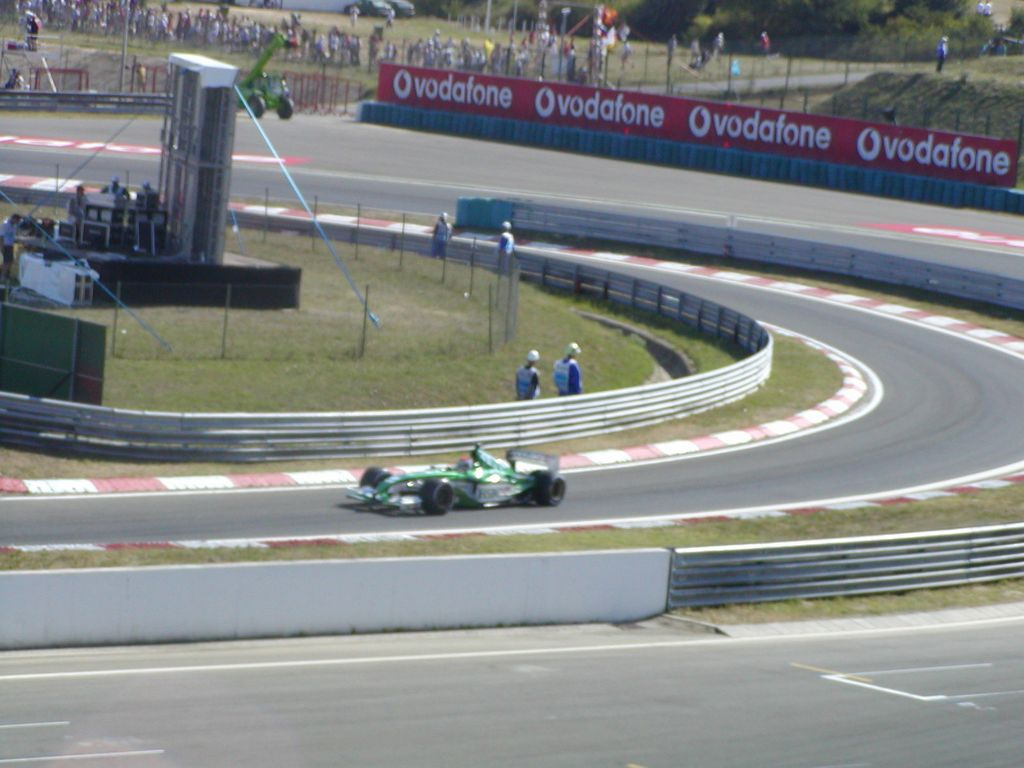
Wilson driving for Jaguar at the 2003 Hungarian Grand Prix

Wilson equalled the pace of his more experienced teammate Jos Verstappen; Wilson generally qualified in a low grid slot and made brisk starts to gain track position before a pit stop.

=== Jaguar (rest of 2003 season) ===
Before the German Grand Prix, Jaguar selected him to replace the under-performing Antônio Pizzonia for the rest of the season. (Note: Wilson's seat at Minardi was filled by the International Formula 3000 driver Nicolas Kiesa.) David Pitchforth, Jaguar's managing director, and team principal Tony Purnell were impressed with Wilson's performances and driving; they received feedback from Stoddart and Wilson's mechanics at Nordic Racing. Palmer told Wilson to visit Jaguar's headquarters in Milton Keynes for a seat fitting at midnight with a contract written up the day after the British Grand Prix. Having been granted the final five races to convince Jaguar to keep him alongside Webber for 2004, Wilson found the Jaguar different to handle than his Minardi and did not foresee the change in driving style required to use it. His teammate outperformed him by half a second on average in his first four races with the team due to his unfamiliarity with the car, but was consistently within three to four-tenths of a second per lap of Webber's pace by the end of the season. Wilson finished eighth at the United States Grand Prix and was twentieth in the drivers' standings with one point.

Wilson was linked to three teams for the 2004 season. Jaguar granted Wilson a contract extension until post-season testing ended in December to convince the team to retain him. Jaguar dropped Wilson because its owner, Ford, was not prepared to pour unlimited funds into F1 and advised the team to sign a pay driver. Christian Klien, a Formula Three driver funded by the drink company Red Bull, replaced Wilson. A return to Jaguar as a test driver on race weekends became unfeasible after F1's governing body – the Fédération Internationale de l'Automobile (FIA) – retained a regulation for 2004 prohibiting drivers who had competed in six or more F1 events from participating in Friday test sessions.

== American open-wheel racing career ==
=== Champ Car World Series (2004–2007) ===
With the loss of employment in F1, Wilson was disenchanted with his career, and sought a drive in the U.S.-based Champ Car World Series (CCWS) over the rival Indy Racing League (IRL) due to its parity, noting: "Same cars, same engines, so working with the team with a half reasonable budget you can do a half decent job." Wilson signed with the small-budget Conquest Racing team for the 2004 season. The layout of his Lola car allowed him to lie almost flat on its floor and demonstrated a decent performance in pre-season testing. Wilson had a mixed season driving the No. 34 car; he took eight top-ten finishes, with a year-best of fourth at the season-ending Gran Premio Telmex/Tecate. He generally qualified higher than he finished, taking a season-high of second at the Champ Car Grand Prix of Portland. Wilson finished eleventh in the drivers' standings with 188 points, and was second to A. J. Allmendinger in the rookie of the year standings.

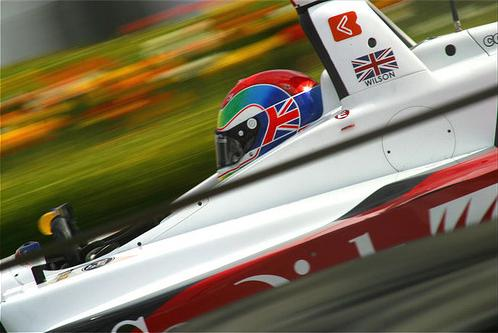
Wilson competing for RuSPORT at the 2005 Toyota Grand Prix of Long Beach

After the season, Wilson declared his wish to remain in the CCWS for the 2005 season and enquired several teams about employment. Car owner Carl Russo signed him to replace Michel Jourdain Jr. at the RuSPORT team in November 2004. Wilson worked with driver coach Barry Waddell, and cautioned his rivals he was ready to win races due to further car and driver development. In the No. 9 Lola-Ford car, Wilson took three fourth-place finishes in the first three rounds before earning his first series pole position at the Champ Car Grand Prix of Portland. He led the final ten laps of the Molson Indy Toronto to claim his first series victory. Wilson followed that victory with four more top-ten finishes, and ended the season with a second career win at the Gran Premio Telmex/Tecate from pole position. He amassed 265 points to finish third in the drivers' championship; his qualifying results improved with nine top-fives.

Wilson remained with RuSPORT for the 2006 season. Several pundits predicted he would challenge for the drivers' championship, and he said his objective was to be consistent and win two or three races. He took four-second-place finishes in the first five rounds. At the season's sixth race, the Molson Grand Prix of Toronto, Wilson won his only pole position that year. At the following West Edmonton Mall Grand Prix of Edmonton, he qualified in third place and achieved his only victory of 2006. Wilson took a further three top-eight finishes. He fractured the scaphoid bone in his right wrist in an accident in practice for the Lexmark Indy 300, requiring him to withdraw from the race; he was deemed fit by the CCWS medical delegate Chris Pinderski to enter the season-ending Gran Premio Telmex. (Note: Adam Carroll, a GP2 Series racer, was shortlisted to replace Wilson if he had been ruled unfit for participation.) He qualified on pole position, and led until Sébastien Bourdais passed him on the final lap. Wilson finished runner-up in the championship with 298 points, and won that year's Greg Moore Legacy Award.

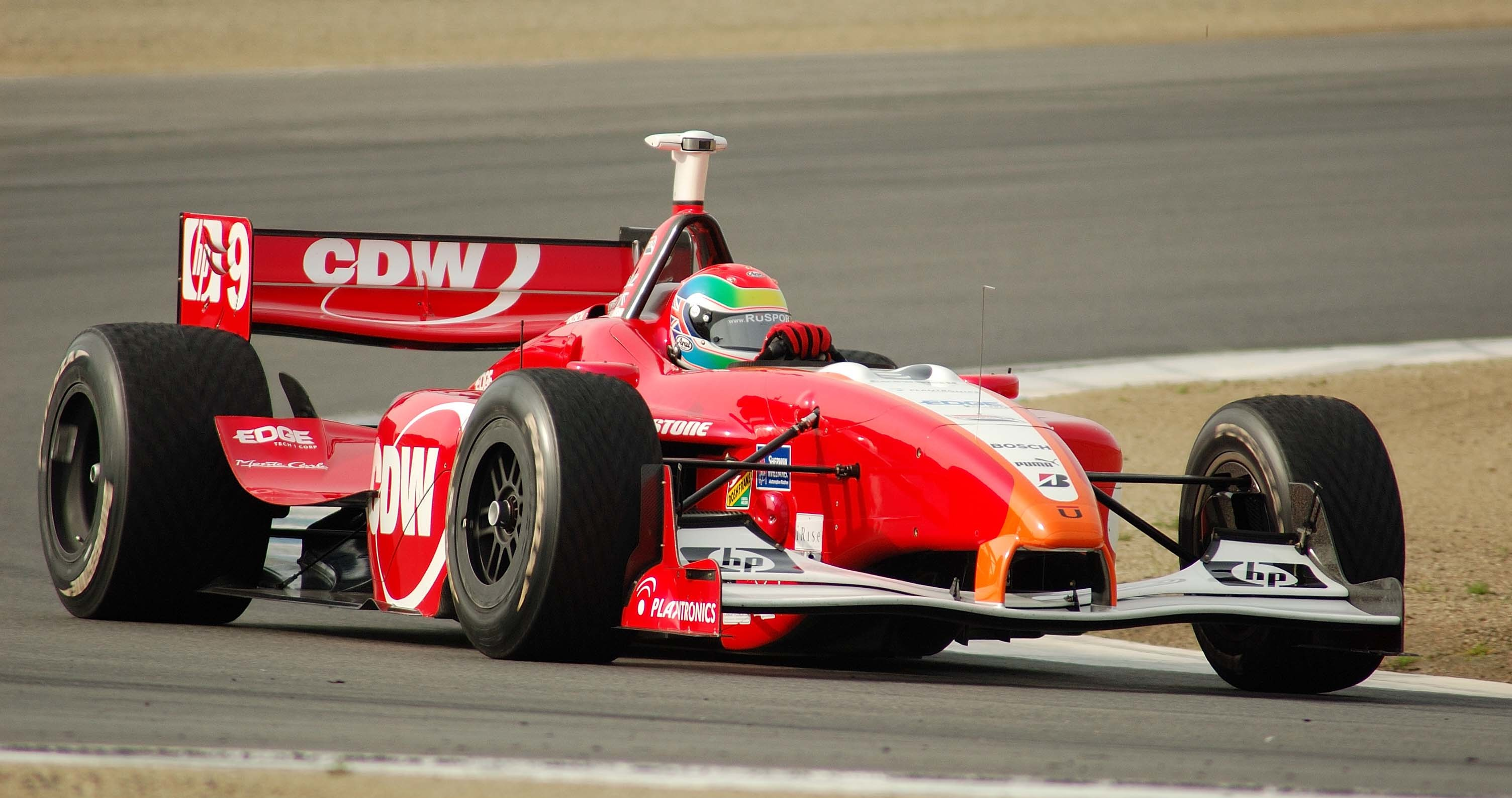
Wilson during pre-season testing for the 2007 Champ Car season

The Newman/Haas, Forsythe and RuSPORT teams were interested in Wilson for the 2007 season. He signed a "multi-year" contract with RuSPORT in January 2007. Wilson was persuaded to remain there after his race engineer Todd Malloy left and limitations in the team's budget saw his assistant Mike Talbott promoted. Driving the No. 9 Panoz DP01-Cosworth XFE he achieved eight top-ten finishes and two pole positions at the Champ Car Grand Prix of Portland and the San Jose Grand Prix at Redback Raceway after ten rounds. Wilson led most of the Bavaria Champ Car Grand Prix for his solitary victory of the season. He ended his CCWS career with consecutive top-ten finishes in the final two rounds to be runner-up in the drivers' championship with 281 points. Wilson won the Greg Moore Legacy Award for the second successive year.

=== IndyCar Series (2008–2015) ===
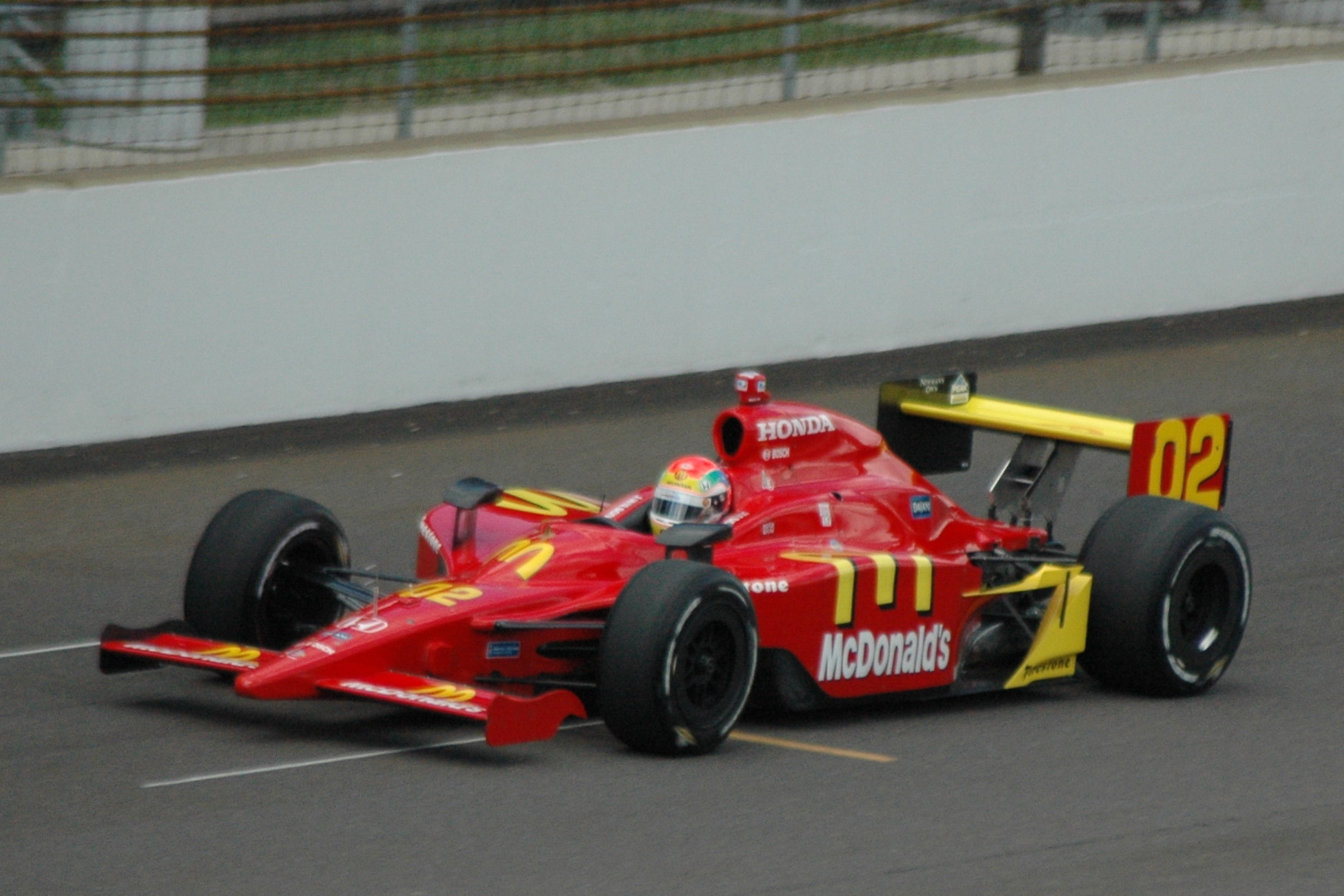
Wilson practising for the 2008 Indianapolis 500

Late in the season, RuSPORT announced it was closing and informed Wilson and his colleagues. He was put on Newman/Haas' shortlist to replace the outgoing Bourdais for the 2008 season, and was rumoured to be in contention to drive for Andretti Green Racing and did not want to move to the American Le Mans Series. Wilson and Palmer agreed terms to join Newman/Haas in the CCWS before it amalgamated with the IRL to form the IndyCar Series. Wilson said his objective for the season was to perform to the best of his ability and acknowledged Newman/Haas would be disadvantaged against the established IndyCar teams on oval tracks noting: "We can only judge the competition when we get there, but we have to be realistic. I don't want to overestimate and I don't want to underestimate."

While Wilson struggled during his rookie season driving the No. 2 Dallara-Honda car, he took pole position for the Toyota Grand Prix of Long Beach, and rapidly established himself as a road course expert. He qualified sixteenth for his first Indianapolis 500. Mid-race, Wilson had an accident due to a loss of control at the rear of his car, which left him 27th. He was third at the Indy Edmonton and achieved his first series victory at the Detroit Indy Grand Prix three races later. Wilson was eleventh in the drivers' championship with 340 points, and was second in the rookie of the year standings, behind Hideki Mutoh but ahead of Will Power.

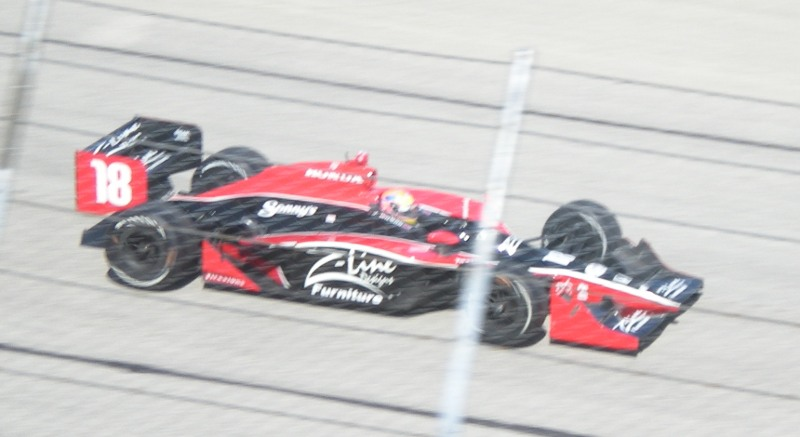
Wilson competing at the 2009 ABC Supply Company A.J. Foyt 225

Before the 2009 season, Newman/Haas co-owner and actor Paul Newman died and the Great Recession cost the team much of its funding. In January 2009 Wilson was released from the team after being informed they could not support two paid drivers without acquiring additional sponsorship. (Note: Wilson's sponsors were transferred to his teammate Graham Rahal.) The funded Robert Doornbos replaced him. He contacted Dale Coyne, the co-owner of the privately underfunded Dale Coyne Racing (DCR) team, in February, after a journalist told him DCR had employed engineer Bill Pappas. Wilson visited their workshop for a seat fitting, and became acquainted with Pappas. He signed a contract to drive for DCR one month later. At the season-opening Grand Prix of St. Petersburg, Wilson began from second and finished third. He qualified fifteenth for the Indianapolis 500; late in the race, Wilson retired following a collision with a barrier after 160 laps, placing 23rd. Wilson started second at the Grand Prix at the Glen and led for 49 out of sixty laps in DCR's first open-wheel victory and his second in the series. With five more top-ten finishes over the rest of the year, he was ninth in the points standings with 354.

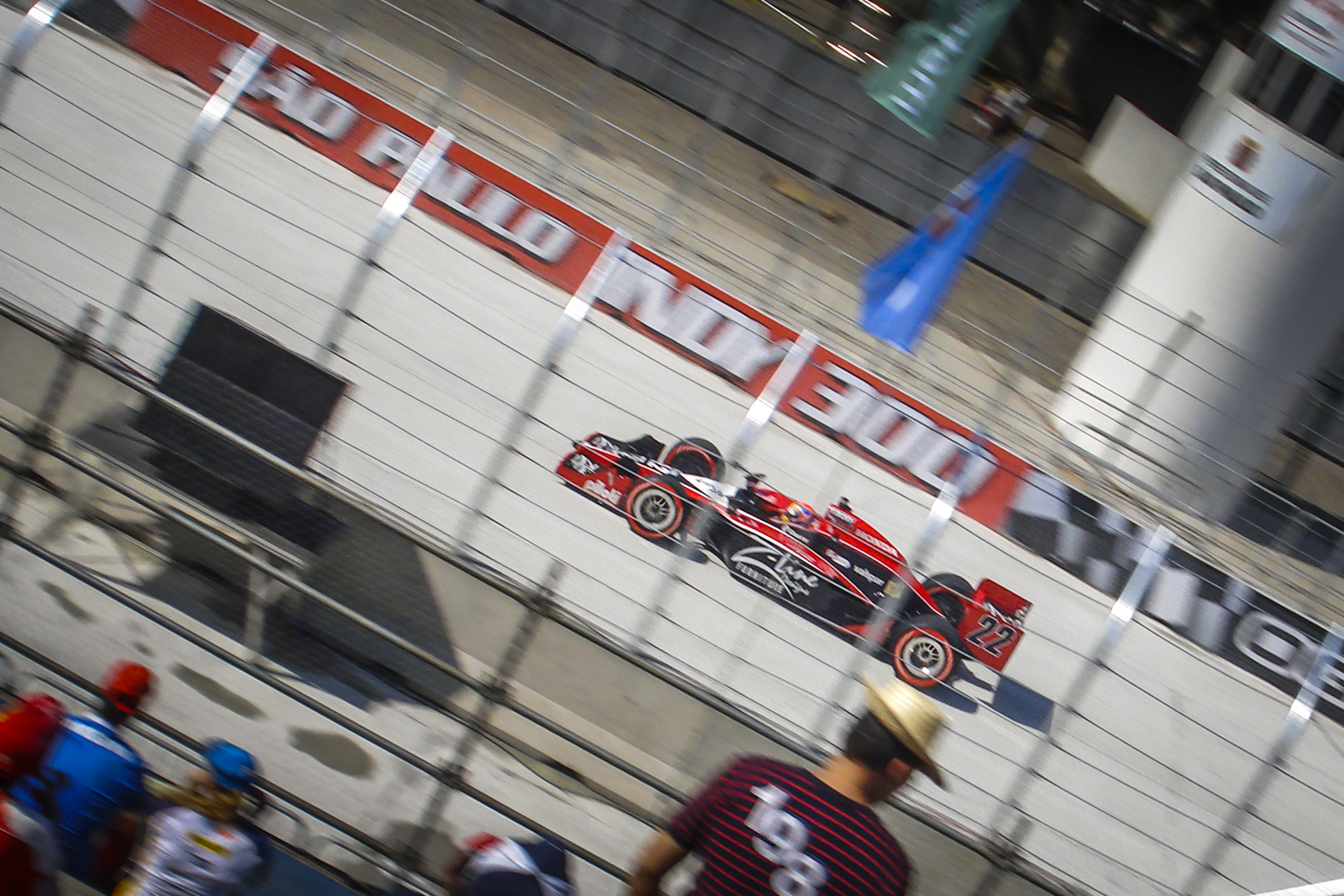
Wilson driving for Dreyer & Reinbold Racing at the 2010 São Paulo Indy 300

Wilson drove Dreyer & Reinbold Racing's (DRR) No. 22 car in the 2010 season. A disagreement over the length of his contract with DCR, the departure of key team personnel and a desire for another experience led him to assess driving elsewhere. Wilson received a telephone call from Dreyer & Reinbold co-owners Robbie Buhl and Dennis Reinbold and visited their workshop in January 2010. He was impressed by what he observed and signed to the team soon after. Wilson mentored his teammate Mike Conway on oval track racing and advised DRR on road courses. In the first four races, he finished second at the Grand Prix of St. Petersburg and the Grand Prix of Long Beach. After qualifying 11th for the Indianapolis 500, Wilson led eleven laps and took seventh. Four races later, he took his first IndyCar pole position for the Honda Indy Toronto. The rest of Wilson's season saw him achieve a best of sixth at the Indy Grand Prix of Sonoma. He was eleventh in the drivers' standings with 361 points.

Although linked with the Andretti Autosport, KV Racing Technology and Panther Racing teams for the 2011 season, Wilson stayed at DRR. An important factor in his decision was the progress he believed the team had made in 2010. Wilson sustained a minor fracture in his left wrist in an accident with Alex Tagliani at the season-opening Grand Prix of St. Petersburg and wore a carbon fibre brace. He started the Indianapolis 500 from nineteenth position. Handling and balance difficulties left Wilson in sixteenth. His best finish of 2011 was fifth at Edmonton Indy. During practice for the Honda Indy 200 an accident left him with a stable burst fracture of the T5 vertebrae in his back. Wilson was ruled unfit for three months and wore a back brace. For the rest of the season, his substitutes were Simon Pagenaud at Mid-Ohio, Tomas Scheckter at New Hampshire Motor Speedway, Giorgio Pantano on the road and street courses and Townsend Bell in Kentucky and Las Vegas. Wilson was 24th in the points standings with 183.

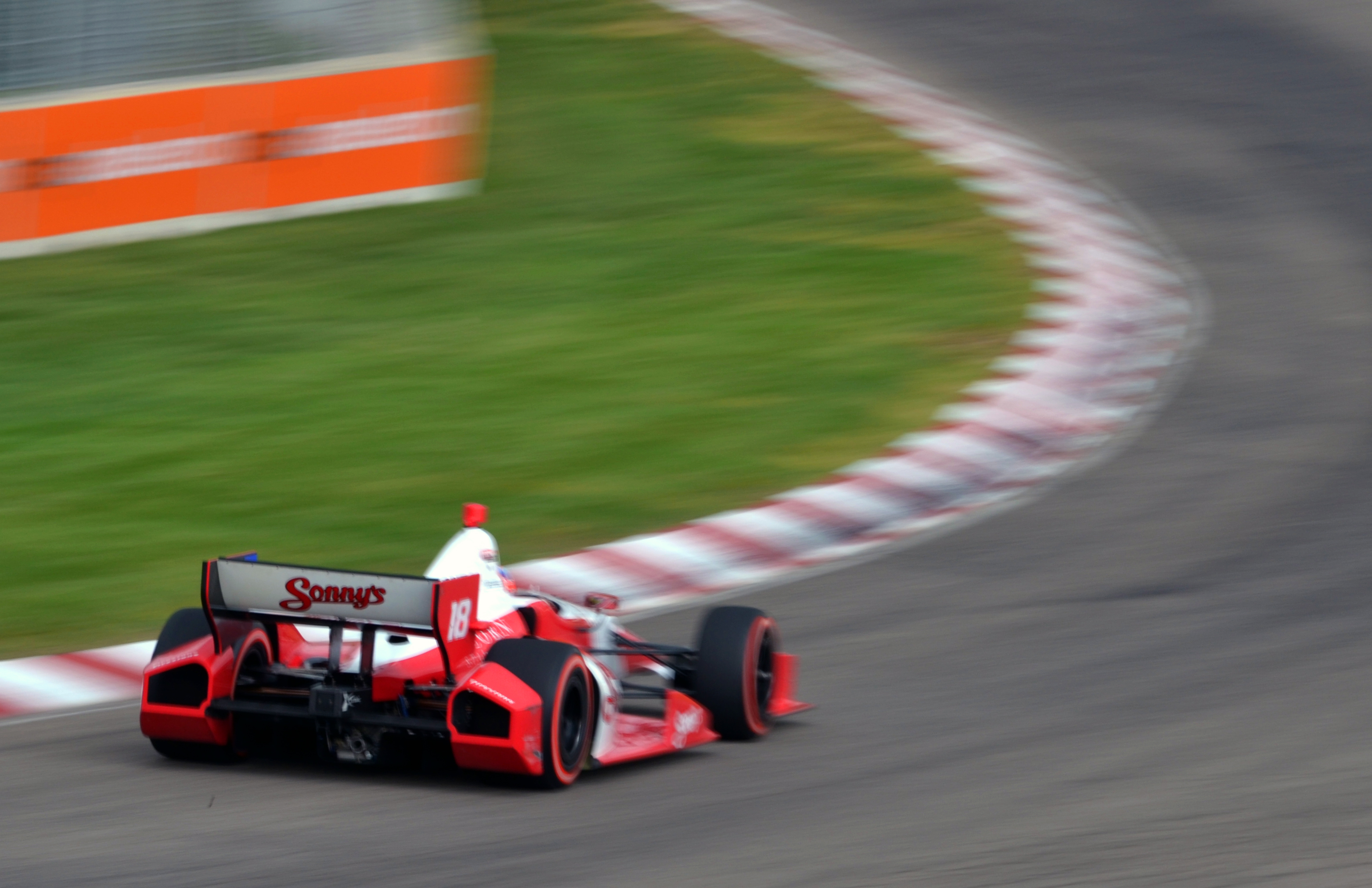
Wilson competing for Dale Coyne Racing at the 2012 Chevrolet Detroit Belle Isle Grand Prix

For the 2012 season, Wilson returned to drive for DCR in its No. 18 Dallara DW12-Honda car. Wilson had two tenth-place finishes in the first four races. At the Indianapolis 500, he qualified in 21st and finished seventh. At the Firestone 550 Wilson overtook Graham Rahal, who crashed with two laps to go, for his third career series victory and his first on an oval track. (Note: Wilson's car failed a post-race inspection because an illegal aerodynamic modification to its sidepod was discovered; he was fined $7,500 and the victory was upheld.) The rest of his season saw him claim two more top-ten results in the final eight races for fifteenth in the drivers' championship with 278 points.

Wilson remained at DCR for the 2013 season after signing a long-term contract; he changed his car number to 19. He began the year with three consecutive top-nine finishes. Wilson qualified for the Indianapolis 500 in fourteenth and finished a career-high fifth. (Note: Wilson's fifth-position finish at the 2013 Indianapolis 500 earned him the Earl Howe Trophy as "the highest placed British driver in the Indianapolis 500 race or to the British driver who has established the most meritorious performance of the year in North America.") His performance for the rest of 2013 included three podium finishes—two third places at the first Detroit Belle Isle Grand Prix and the Grand Prix of Houston, and a season-high second at the Indy Grand Prix of Sonoma. At the season-ending IndyCar World Championships at the Auto Club Speedway, Wilson was involved in a high speed lateral impact with driver Tristan Vautier, sustaining a minor pulmonary contusion and three non-operable breakages to his pelvis. He was told to avoid bearing weight on his right leg before commencing rehabilitation. Wilson finished the season a series-high sixth in the drivers' standings with 472 points.

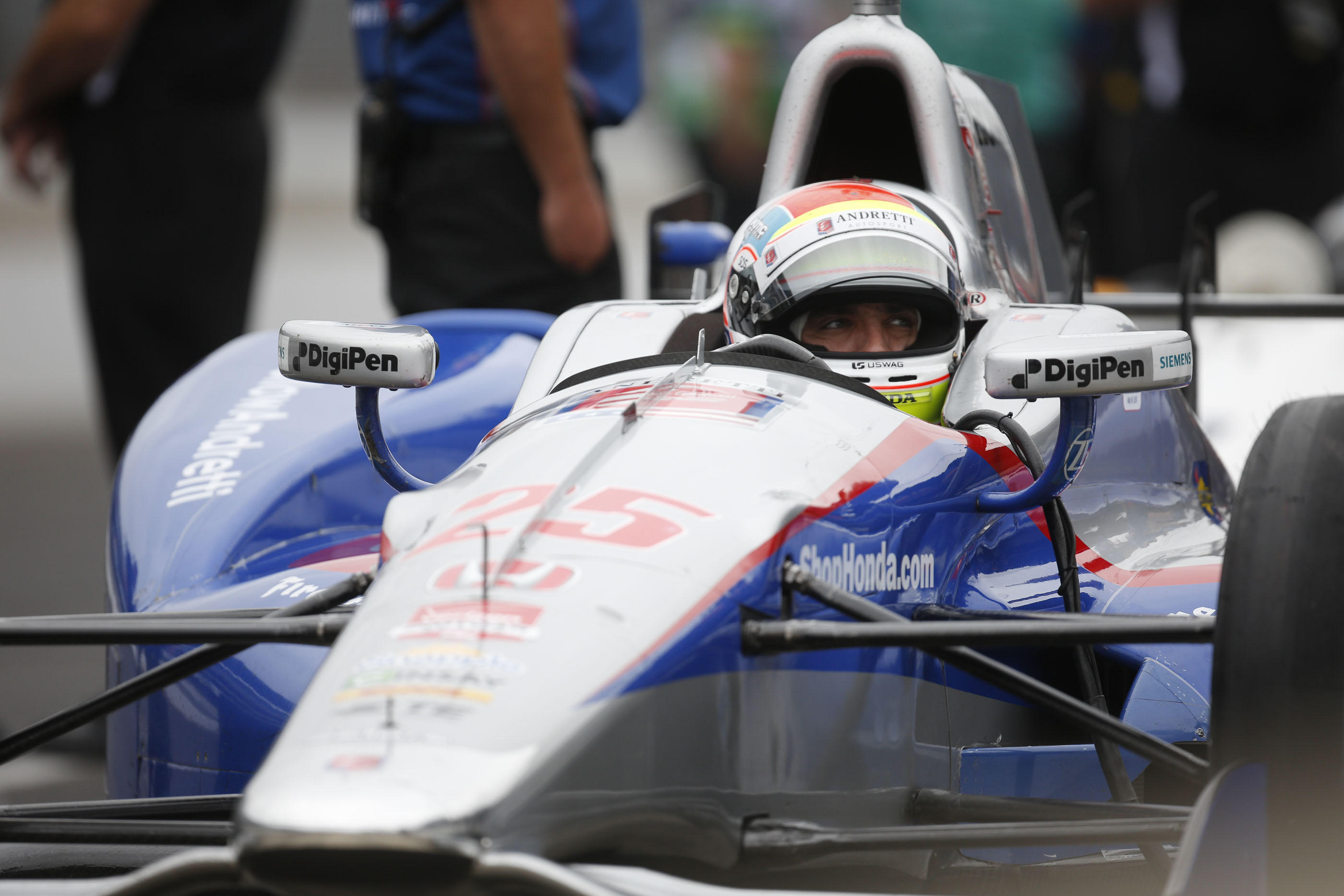
Wilson driving for Andretti Autosport during qualifying for the 2015 Indianapolis 500

DCR owner Dale Coyne took up an option to retain Wilson for the 2014 season after recovering from injury and recommenced training. Michael Cannon became his race engineer after Bill Pappas moved to Rahal Letterman Lanigan Racing. Coyne promised Wilson better resources for him to continue achieving top-ten finishes. His first top ten-finish of 2014 was a sixth at the Indy Grand Prix of Alabama. Wilson started fourteenth at the Indianapolis 500 finishing eight places lower and two laps down in 22nd after debris damaged his front wing late in the race. One race later, Wilson achieved a season-best fourth at the Detroit Belle Isle Grand Prix and four top-ten finishes in the final twelve rounds for fifteenth overall with 395 points.

Wilson left DCR after the season ended because of their limited budget for a full-time campaign, and sought employment with another team for the 2015 season, saying: "It's one of those things, where I could find out tomorrow, or it could be in another month or two months." Talks with Andretti Autosport owner Michael Andretti, who was interested in Wilson, about a full-time campaign ended in March 2015 over sponsorship issues. That same month, Wilson signed a two-race contract to drive Andretti Autosport's No. 25 car in May's Grand Prix of Indianapolis and the Indianapolis 500. He started his final Indianapolis 500 from sixth position. During the race a tyre vibration and a pit stop strategy error left him in 21st. Afterwards, Wilson obtained sponsorship to drive the season's final five races for Andretti, finishing a year-high second in the Honda Indy 200 at Mid-Ohio, in an aerodynamically inefficient car.

== Other racing ventures ==
Wilson made his sports car racing debut at the 2001 FIA GT Magny-Cours 500km, part of the FIA GT Championship. He shared the Coca-Cola Racing Team's No. 65 Porsche 911 GT3-RS with Tomáš Enge, finishing third in the N-GT category. He joined fellow British drivers Ben Collins and Christian Vann in a Team Ascari-entered Ascari KZR-1 car in the LMP900 class at the 2002 12 Hours of Sebring (part of the American Le Mans Series), finishing sixth. Two years later, he again entered the season-opening 12 Hours of Sebring, this time joined by Milka Duno and Phil Andrews. Driving a Taurus Racing-fielded Lola B2K/10 they finished 9th in class and 22nd overall. In June, Wilson competed at the 24 Hours of Le Mans, with Tom Coronel and Ralph Firman in the No. 16 Racing for Holland Dome S101-Judd car, retiring after 313 laps with ignition failure.

At the 2006 24 Hours of Daytona (part of the Rolex Sports Car Series), Wilson drove for Michael Shank Racing (MSR) alongside A. J. Allmendinger, Oswaldo Negri Jr. and Mark Patterson in the No. 60 Riley MkXI-Lexus car in the Daytona Prototype (DP) category, completing 733 laps and finishing second. He entered the season-ending round of the 2007 Rolex Sports Car Series, the Sunchaser 1000, joining Negri and Patterson at MSR and finishing tenth. He returned to MSR for the 2008 24 Hours of Daytona with Negri, Patterson and Graham Rahal, driving the Riley Mk.XX-Ford DP vehicle and finishing sixth after starting from pole position.

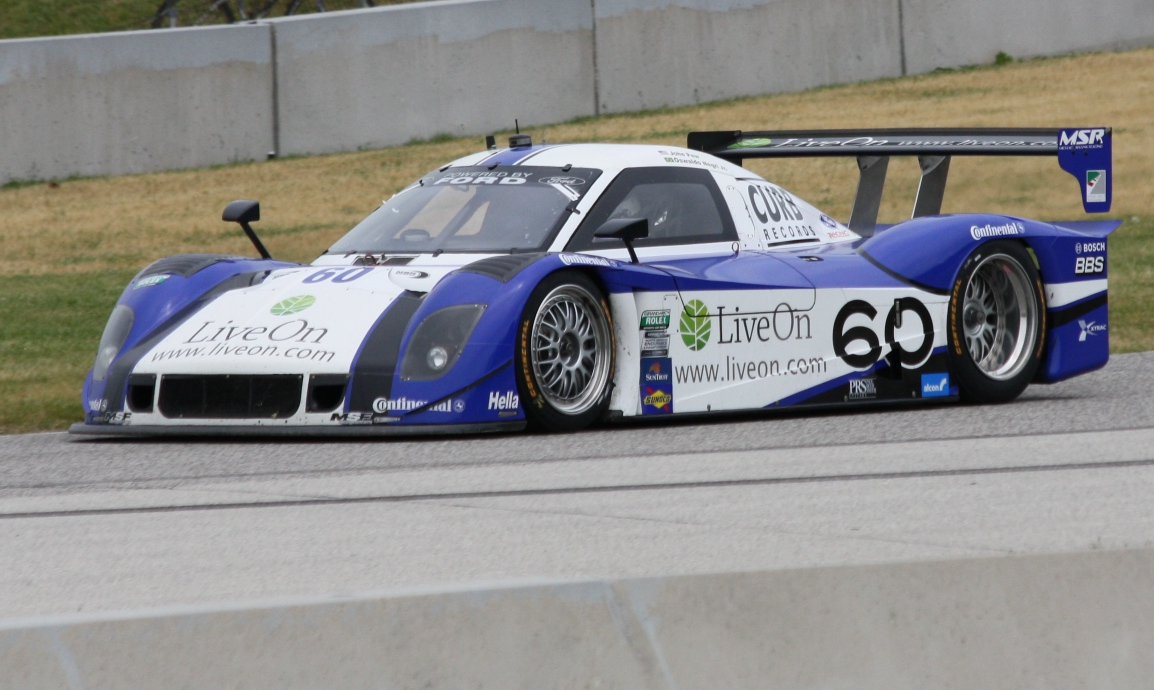
The No. 60 Michael Shank Racing Riley Mk.XXVI-Ford that Wilson shared with A. J. Allmendinger, Oswaldo Negri Jr. and John Pew to win the 2012 24 Hours of Daytona outright

In 2010, Wilson entered the 24 Hours of Daytona for the third time, this time for Chip Ganassi Racing with Felix Sabates in the DP class. The No. 01 Riley Mk.XX-BMW car he shared with Max Papis, Scott Pruett and Memo Rojas finished second after starting fifth. Wilson returned to MSR with Curb/Agajanian for the 2011 24 Hours of Daytona, partnering Allmendinger and Michael McDowell, starting eighth and finishing seventh in the No. 6 Dallara DP01-Ford car. He won the 2012 24 Hours of Daytona with Allmendinger, Negri and John Pew at MSR, completing 761 laps in the No. 60 Riley-Ford DP car. He joined Kelly Racing as Greg Murphy's international co-driver in its No. 51 Holden Commodore for the Gold Coast 600 double header round of the V8 Supercars Championship in October 2012. Wilson visited the team's workshop for a seat fitting as preparation for the round. He and Murphy finished outside of the top-ten in both races.

Wilson entered the 24 Hours of Daytona alongside Allmendinger, Marcos Ambrose, Negri and Pew at MSR in 2013, finishing third. He partnered Gustavo Yacamán in MSR's No. 6 Riley-Ford car at the Six Hours at the Glen when regular driver Antônio Pizzonia had sponsorship problems, finishing sixth. With no date conflicts between the IndyCar Series and the Rolex Sports Car Series, Wilson entered the 2013 Rolex Sports Car Series' final four rounds to partner and mentor Yacamán. The duo had a season-best second-place finish at Lime Rock. At the 2014 24 Hours of Daytona (now part of the IMSA SportsCar Championship), Wilson, Allmendinger, Negri and Pew were twelfth in the prototype class and 47th overall due to a gearbox fault in the No. 60 Riley-Ford Ecoboost car. He rejoined Negri and Pew at MSR for the following 12 Hours of Sebring, finishing ninth.

In 2015, Wilson replaced Matt McMurry as co-driver to Negri and Pew in MSR's No. 60 Ligier JS P2-Honda car at the 12 Hours of Sebring, where they came 42nd. As Wilson waited for a new IndyCar Series contract, he was entered into the all-electric Formula E round in Moscow by Andretti Autosport in June. He replaced Scott Speed, who had an X Games commitment. Wilson finished tenth and scored one championship point for a 25th drivers standing finish. A planned drive in a HPD ARX-04b at the Pikes Peak International Hill Climb in June was cancelled because turbocharger failures damaged the car's motors.

== Death ==
On the 179th lap of the 2015 ABC Supply 500 at Pocono Raceway on 23 August, race leader Sage Karam lost control of his car in the first turn after passing a bump in the tarmac surface. He crashed heavily with the front of his car against a wall to the right of the circuit. The car's nose cone was removed with enough force that it ricocheted along the racing surface as other drivers manoeuvred past it. James Jakes slowed faster than Wilson, who turned right to avoid contact with his car. At the same time, the nose cone from Karam's car struck Wilson's helmet as he drove through the accident scene. Wilson was knocked unconscious and his car almost immediately veered left out of control towards the inside wall. It left the track, hitting the left-hand side wall coupled with a SAFER barrier after the first turn and continued to slide before stopping.

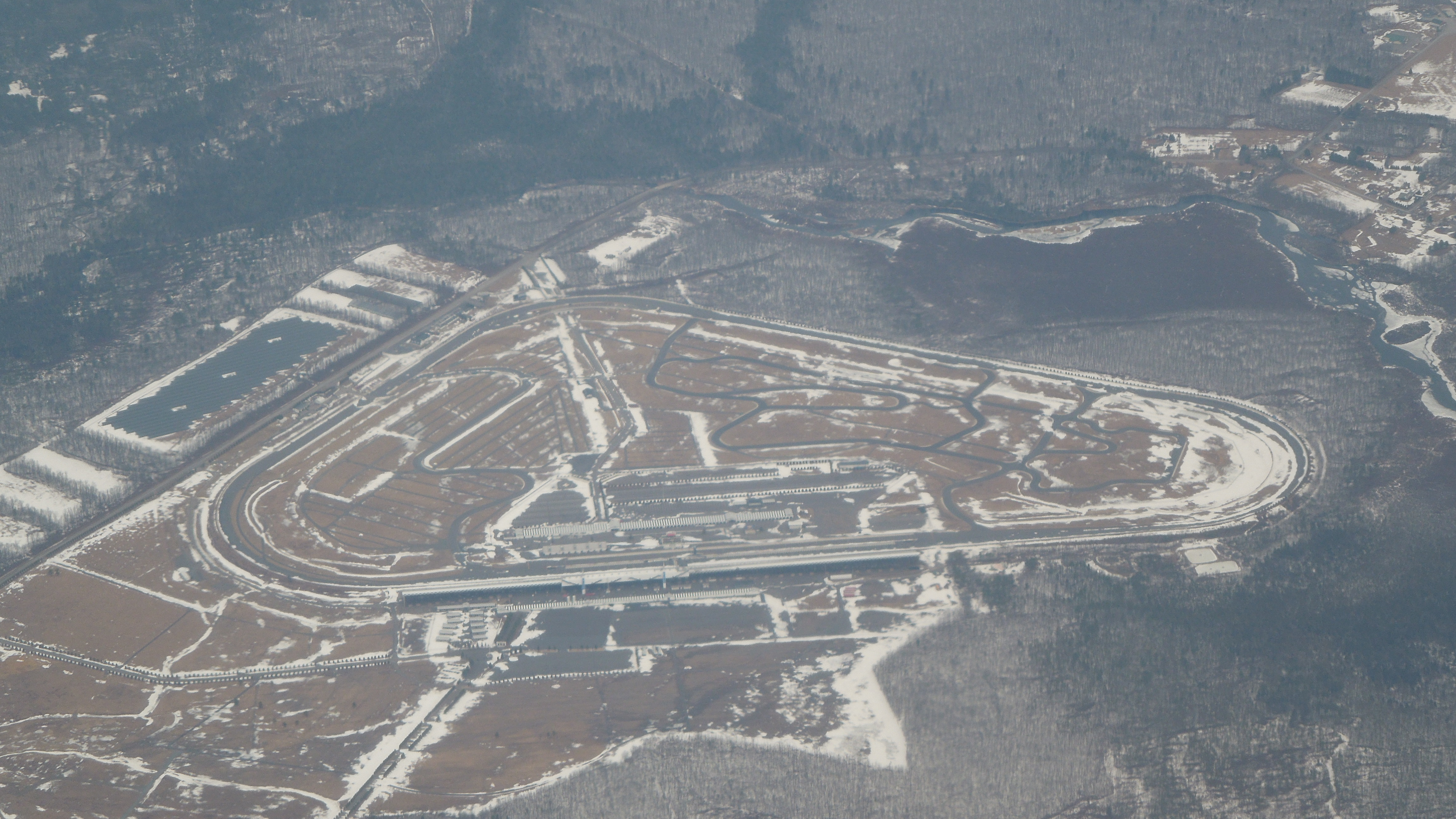
Pocono Raceway, where Wilson sustained fatal injuries from being struck by airborne debris from the car of Sage Karam

Wilson was unresponsive when the track safety crew arrived at his vehicle and he had to be extricated from it. A medivac helicopter was called for and transported Wilson to Lehigh Valley Hospital–Cedar Crest in nearby Allentown, Pennsylvania. He was reported to be in a coma with a severe head injury and listed in critical condition. Wilson was declared dead from his injuries the following day, at 17:37 local time on 24 August. The Indianapolis Motor Speedway president J. Douglas Boles and the CEO of Hulman & Company Mark Miles made the news public at 21:00 that same day. He was the first driver to die from injuries sustained in a racing accident in IndyCar since Dan Wheldon was killed during the 2011 IZOD IndyCar World Championship at Las Vegas Motor Speedway. An autopsy conducted by Andrew Kehm, the Chief Deputy Coroner of the Lehigh County Coroner's Office, on 26 August determined Wilson died of blunt force trauma to his head. On 10 September, he was given a funeral service at St. James The Great Church in Paulerspury, Northamptonshire, England attended by about 500 mourners, which included members of the motor racing community. Wilson was subsequently cremated, and a wake was held for him at Silverstone Circuit.

An inquest into his death was held at Northampton General Hospital on the morning of 9 March 2016. (Note: As of 2019, the full report into Wilson's death compiled by the IndyCar Series has not been released to the public.) The coroner concluded his death was "accidental". A statement from Wilson's father was read, which described the crash as a "freak accident" and stated:

"The car leading the race crashed and was driving at over 200 miles per hour [320 km/h]. The driver was unhurt but debris from his car flew high into the air and a large, heavy piece hit Justin on the head as he approached the scene of the accident. Justin was unconscious, he was extracted from the car and rushed to hospital. He underwent surgery and was kept on a life support machine until the following day. The decision was then taken to switch off the machine and Justin was pronounced deceased."

== Personality and legacy ==
David Tremayne of The Independent described Wilson as an "easy-going and humble" individual who was able to build a rapport with others. According to Alasdair Steven of The Herald: "his cheerful, quietly modest manner, and genuine enthusiasm" made him popular with fans of motor racing. A leader of the IndyCar safety and promotional association alongside Dario Franchitti and Tony Kanaan, Wilson increased his lobbying for improved safety after the death of Dan Wheldon in 2011. He aspired to have retention walls altered to better deal with airborne crashes, and wrote an online article arguing for the shifting of trackside grandstands to inside racing circuits as a means of shielding spectators from debris.

Nicknamed "Bad Ass" by his driving instructor colleagues at PalmerSport in 1999, for being "as fearsome a competitor you could ever find", Wilson was friendly, shy, endearing, soft-spoken and highly analytical. His technical shrewdness provided teams with extensive performance alterations to improve a race car. According to Racer's Mark Glendenning this made Wilson a driver who "commanded universal respect" from fellow competitors. For DailySportsCar editor Graham Goodwin it created an image of Wilson as "a very rare breed indeed, a man in the modern age who had competed at the highest level in multiple motorsport disciplines", and a driver who "had the cutting edge". Wilson was fast-witted and used this in his humour.

After Wilson's death, the donation of his organs helped to save the lives of five people. On 27 August IndyCar drivers Marco Andretti, James Hinchcliffe, Josef Newgarden, Will Power and Graham Rahal converted what had been a previously planned promotion for the season-ending Grand Prix of Sonoma at Sonoma Raceway by driving their cars across the Golden Gate Bridge in San Francisco into a tribute for Wilson. Andretti drove Wilson's No. 25 car. Honda and Andretti Autosport employed Wilson's close friend and fellow driver Oriol Servià to drive his car in Sonoma.

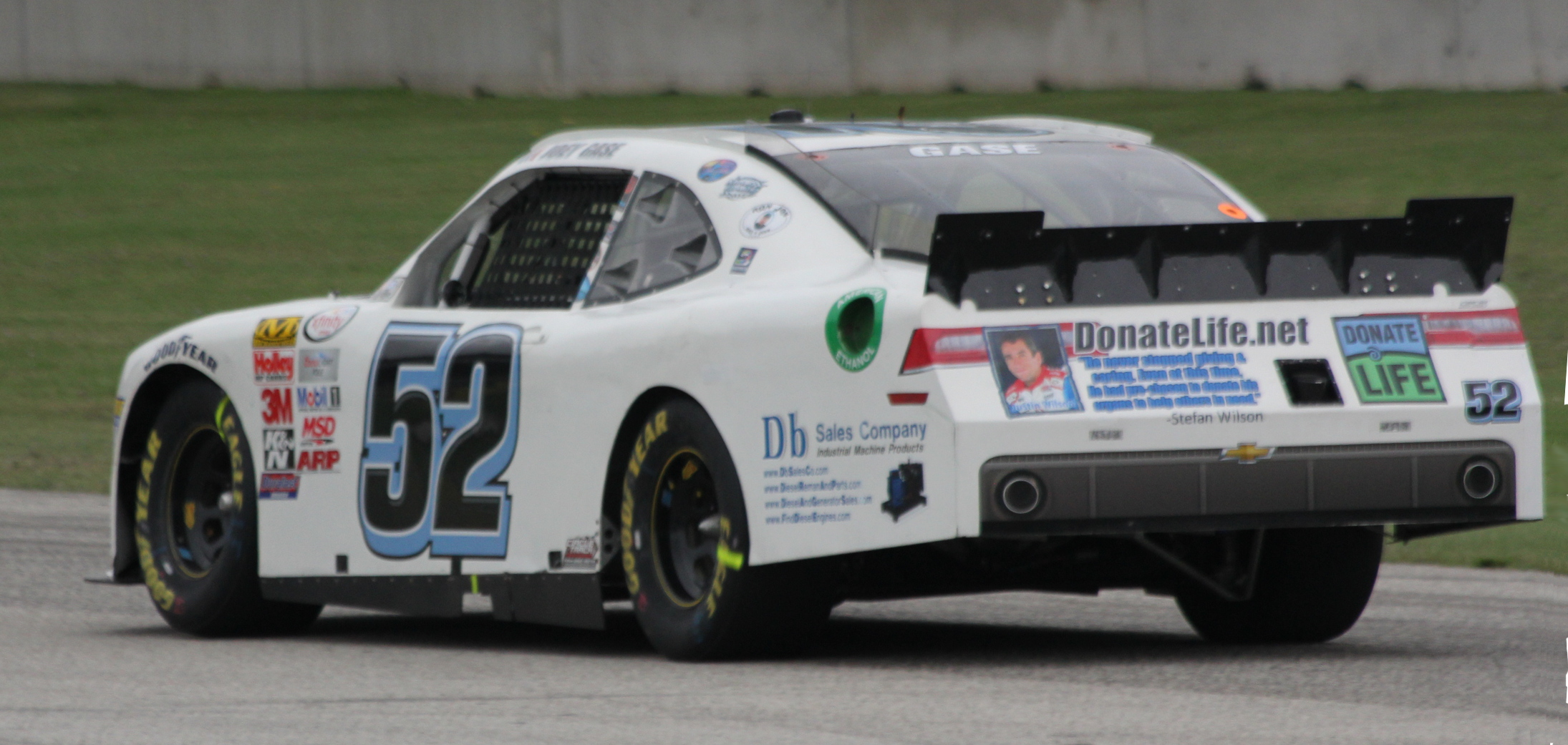
NASCAR Xfinity Series driver Joey Gase ran with Wilson's image at the rear of his car to promote awareness of eye, organ and tissue donation.

Joey Gase, a NASCAR Xfinity Series driver, carried a photograph of Wilson on the rear of his No. 52 car to promote awareness of eye, organ and tissue donation. A. J. Allmendinger had his former teammate Wilson's name above the window of his vehicle for the final 12 rounds of the 2015 NASCAR Sprint Cup Series. At the 2016 Indianapolis 500, Stefan drove the No. 25 KV Racing Technology car in honour of his elder sibling. The name of a hairpin turn on the Snetterton Circuit's 300 layout was changed from Montreal Corner to Wilson Corner by the track's owners MotorSport Vision in July 2016; a board at the corner features the design of Wilson's multi-coloured rainbow racing helmet and his surname.

The Wilson Children's Fund was launched with the support of his widow Julia to ensure their two daughters would be financially secure in the long term following his death. Contributions are raised through the auctioning of motor racing memorabilia on the internet and by public donations.

== Motorsports career results ==
=== Career summary ===
Season	Series	Team	Races	Wins	Poles	F/Laps	Podiums	Points	Position
1994	Formula A British Championship	?	?	?	?	?	?	?	5th
1995	Formula Vauxhall Junior Championship	Team JLR	?	?	?	?	?	118	3rd
1996	British Formula Vauxhall	Paul Stewart Racing	?	1	2	3	?	?	2nd
1997	British Formula Vauxhall	Paul Stewart Racing	?	3	2	4	?	?	4th
1998	Formula Palmer Audi	MotorSport Vision	16	7	?	?	?	240	1st
1999	International Formula 3000 Championship	Team Astromega	10	0	0	0	0	2	20th
2000	International Formula 3000 Championship	Nordic Racing	10	0	0	0	1	16	5th
2001	International Formula 3000 Championship	Coca-Cola Nordic Racing	12	3	2	1	10	71	1st
2002	World Series by Nissan	Racing Engineering	18	2	2	0	8	171	4th
2003	Formula One	Trust Minardi Cosworth	11	0	0	0	0	1	20th
2003	Formula One	HSBC Jaguar Racing	5	0	0	0	0	1	20th
2004	Champ Car World Series	Mi-Jack Conquest Racing	14	0	0	0	0	188	11th
2005	Champ Car World Series	RuSPORT	13	2	2	2	3	265	3rd
2006	Champ Car World Series	RuSPORT	13	1	2	1	7	298	2nd
2007	Champ Car World Series	RSPORTS; RuSPORT	14	1	2	1	5	281	2nd
2008	IndyCar Series	Newman/Haas/Lanigan Racing	18	1	0	2	2	340	11th
2009	IndyCar Series	Dale Coyne Racing	17	1	0	1	2	354	9th
2010	IndyCar Series	Dreyer & Reinbold Racing	17	0	1	1	2	361	11th
2011	IndyCar Series	Dreyer & Reinbold Racing	11	0	0	1	0	183	24th
2012	IndyCar Series	Dale Coyne Racing	15	1	0	0	1	278	16th
2013	IndyCar Series	Dale Coyne Racing	19	0	0	1	4	472	6th
2014	IndyCar Series	Dale Coyne Racing	18	0	0	0	0	0	22nd
2014–15	Formula E Championship	Andretti Autosport	1	0	0	0	0	1	25th
2015	IndyCar Series	Andretti Autosport	6	0	0	0	1	108	24th

=== Complete International Formula 3000 results ===
(key) (Races in bold indicate pole position) (Races in italics indicate fastest lap; small number denotes finishing position)

Year	Entrant	1	2	3	4	5	6	7	8	9	10	11	12	DC	Points
1999	Team Astromega	IMO; 6	MON; Ret	CAT; 6	MAG; 10	SIL; Ret	A1R; Ret	HOC; Ret	HUN; 7	SPA; Ret	NÜR; Ret			20th	2
2000	Nordic Racing	IMO; 8	SIL; 3	CAT; 5	NÜR; Ret	MON; 7	MAG; 9	A1R; 2	HOC; Ret	HUN; 5	SPA; 5			5th	16
2001	Coca-Cola Nordic Racing	INT; 1	IMO; 6	**CAT**; 3	A1R; 1	MON; 2	NÜR; Ret	MAG; 2	SIL; 2	HOC; 2	**HUN**; 1	SPA; 2	MNZ; 2	**1st**	**71**

=== Complete World Series by Nissan results ===
(key) (Races in bold indicate pole position) (Races in italics indicate fastest lap; small number denotes finishing position)

Year	Entrant	1	2	3	4	5	6	7	8	9	10	11	12	13	14	15	16	17	18	DC	Points
2002	Racing Engineering	VAL1; 1 Ret	VAL1; 2 Ret	JAR; 1; 3	JAR; 2 Ret	ALB; 1; 4	ALB; 2; 9	MNZ; 1; 3	MNZ; 2; 4	MAG; 1; 4	**MAG**; **2**; 5	**CAT**; **1**; 3	CAT; 2; 5	VAL2; 1; 3	VAL2; 2; 1	CUR; 1; 3	CUR; 2; 4	INT; 1; 2	INT; 2; 1	4th	171

=== Complete American Le Mans Series results ===
Year	Entrant	Class	Chassis	Engine	1	2	3	4	5	6	7	8	9	10	Rank	Points
2002	Team Ascari	LMP900	Ascari KZR-1	Judd GV4 4.0L V10	SEB; 6	SON	MDO	AME	WAS	TRO	MOS	MON	MIA	PET	39th	19
2004	Taurus Racing	LMP1	Lola B2K/10	Judd GV4 4.0L V10	SEB; 9	MDO	LIM	SON	POR	MOS	AME	PET	MON		27th	8

=== Complete Formula One results ===
(key)

Year	Entrant	Chassis	Engine	1	2	3	4	5	6	7	8	9	10	11	12	13	14	15	16	WDC	Points
2003	European Minardi Cosworth (Note: Minardi entered rounds 7–11 as "Trust Minardi Cosworth".)	Minardi PS03	Cosworth V10	AUS; Ret	MAL; Ret	BRA; Ret	SMR; Ret	ESP; 11	AUT; 13	MON; Ret	CAN; Ret	EUR; 13	FRA; 14	GBR; 16						20th	1
2003	Jaguar Racing	Jaguar R4	Cosworth V10												GER; Ret	HUN; Ret	ITA; Ret	USA; 8	JPN; 13	20th	1

=== Complete American open-wheel racing results ===
(key)

==== Champ Car World Series ====
Year	Team	No.	Chassis	Engine	1	2	3	4	5	6	7	8	9	10	11	12	13	14	Rank	Points	Ref
2004	Conquest Racing	34	Lola B02/00	Ford XFE V8 t	LBH; 6	MTY; 6		POR; 5	CLE; 18	TOR; 12	VAN; 14	ROA; 7	DEN; 7	MTL; 14	LS; 18	LVG; 8	SRF; 8	MXC; 4	11th	188	
2004	Conquest Racing	34	Reynard 02I	Ford XFE V8 t			MIL; 11												11th	188	
2005	RuSPORT	9	Lola B02/00	Ford XFE V8 t	LBH; 4	MTY; 4	MIL; 4	**POR**; 17	CLE; 7	TOR; 1	EDM; 4	SJO; 4	DEN; 17	MTL; 3	LVG; 11	SRF; 7	**MXC**; 1		3rd	265	
2006	RuSPORT	9	Lola B02/00	Ford XFE V8 t	LBH; 2	HOU; 5	MTY; 2	MIL; 2	POR; 2	CLE; 13	**TOR**; 4	EDM; 1	SJO; 3	DEN; 8	MTL; 14	ROA; 5	SRF; Wth	**MXC**; 2	2nd	298	
2007	RSPORTS	9	Panoz DP01	Cosworth XFE V8 t	LVG; 14	LBH; 4	HOU; 10	**POR**; 2	CLE; 4	MTT; 5	TOR; 3	EDM; 2	**SJO**; 13	ROA; 8					2nd	281	
2007	RuSPORT	9	Panoz DP01	Cosworth XFE V8 t											ZOL; 5	ASN; 1	SRF; 2	MXC; 10	2nd	281	

Years	Teams	Races	Poles	Wins	Podiums (non-win)	Top 10s (non-podium)	Championships
4	3	54	6	4	11	25	0

==== IndyCar Series ====
Year	Team	No.	Chassis	Engine	1	2	3	4	5	6	7	8	9	10	11	12	13	14	15	16	17	18	19	Rank	Points	Ref
2008	Newman/Haas/Lanigan Racing	02	Dallara	Honda	HMS; 15	STP; 9	MOT^{1}		KAN; 9	INDY; 27	MIL; 7	TXS; 27	IOW; 12	RIR; 7	WGL; 25	NSH; 18	MDO; 11	EDM; 3	KTY; 19	SNM; 9	DET; 1	CHI; 11	SRF^{2} 12	11th	340	
2008	Newman/Haas/Lanigan Racing	02	Panoz	Cosworth				**LBH**^{1} 19																11th	340	
2009	Dale Coyne Racing	19	Dallara	Honda	STP; 3																			9th	354	
2009	Dale Coyne Racing	18	Dallara	Honda		LBH; 22	KAN; 14	INDY; 23	MIL; 15	TXS; 15	IOW; 18	RIR; 14	WGL; 1	TOR; 5	EDM; 8	KTY; 21	MDO; 13	SNM; 7	CHI; 10	MOT; 12	HMS; 10			9th	354	
2010	Dreyer & Reinbold Racing	22	Dallara	Honda	SAO; 11	STP; 2	ALA; 7	LBH; 2	KAN; 18	INDY; 7	TXS; 19	IOW; 24	WGL; 10	**TOR**; 7*	EDM; 21	MDO; 27	SNM; 6	CHI; 7	KTY; 11	MOT; 16	HMS; 21			11th	361	
2011	Dreyer & Reinbold Racing	22	Dallara	Honda	STP; 10	ALA; 19	LBH; 22	SAO; 7	INDY; 16	TXS; 17	TXS; 21	MIL; 10	IOW; 12	TOR; 15	EDM; 5	MDO; Wth	NHM; Inj	SNM; Inj	BAL; Inj	MOT; Inj	KTY; Inj	LVS; C		24th	183	
2012	Dale Coyne Racing	18	Dallara DW12	Honda	STP; 10	ALA; 19	LBH; 10	SAO; 22	INDY; 7	DET; 22	TXS; 1	MIL; 23	IOW; 10	TOR; 21	EDM; 9	MDO; 18	SNM; 11	BAL; 17	FON; 23					15th	278	
2013	Dale Coyne Racing	19	Dallara DW12	Honda	STP; 9	ALA; 8	LBH; 3	SAO; 20	INDY; 5	DET; 3	DET; 22	TXS; 15	MIL; 9	IOW; 11	POC; 7	TOR; 11	TOR; 8	MDO; 8	SNM; 2	BAL; 4	HOU; 3	HOU; 4	FON; 18	6th	472	
2014	Dale Coyne Racing	19	Dallara DW12	Honda	STP; 8	LBH; 16	ALA; 6	IMS; 11	INDY; 22	DET; 4	DET; 12	TXS; 21	HOU; 10	HOU; 12	POC; 14	IOW; 13	TOR; 10	TOR; 10	MDO; 15	MIL; 17	SNM; 9	FON; 13		15th	395	
2015	Andretti Autosport	25	Dallara DW12	Honda	STP	NLA	LBH	ALA	IMS; 24	INDY; 21	DET	DET	TXS	TOR	FON	MIL; 18	IOW; 17	MDO; 2	POC; 15	SNM				24th	108	

^{1} Run on same day.
^{2} Non-points-paying, exhibition race.

Years	Teams	Races	Poles	Wins	Podiums (non-win)	Top 10s (non-podium)	Indianapolis 500 wins	Championships
8	4	120	2	3	9	41	0	0

==== Indianapolis 500 ====
Year	Chassis	Engine	Start	Finish	Team
2008	Dallara	Honda	16	27	Newman/Haas/Lanigan Racing
2009	Dallara	Honda	15	23	Dale Coyne Racing
2010	Dallara	Honda	11	7	Dreyer & Reinbold Racing
2011	Dallara	Honda	19	16	Dreyer & Reinbold Racing
2012	Dallara	Honda	21	7	Dale Coyne Racing
2013	Dallara	Honda	14	5	Dale Coyne Racing
2014	Dallara	Honda	14	22	Dale Coyne Racing
2015	Dallara	Honda	6	21	Andretti Autosport

=== Complete 24 Hours of Le Mans results ===
Year	Team	Co-drivers	Car	Class	Laps	Pos	Class pos
2004	Racing for Holland	Tom Coronel; Ralph Firman	Dome S101-Judd	LMP1	313	DNF	DNF

=== Complete IMSA SportsCar Championship ===
Year	Team	Class	Chassis	Engine	1	2	3	4	5	6	7	8	9	10	11	Rank	Points
2014	Michael Shank Racing	P	Ford EcoBoost Riley DP	Ford EcoBoost 3.5 L V6 Turbo	DAY; 12	SEB; 9	LBH	LGA	DET	WGL	MSP	IND	ELK	COA	PET	40th	43
2015	Michael Shank Racing w/ Curb/Agajanian	P	Ligier JS P2	Honda HR28TT 2.8 L V6 Turbo	DAY	SEB; 13	LBH	LGA	DET	WGL	MOS	ELK	COA	PET		33rd	19

==== Complete 24 Hours of Daytona results ====
Year	Team	Co-drivers	Car	Class	Laps	Pos	Class pos
2006	Michael Shank Racing	A. J. Allmendinger; Oswaldo Negri Jr. Mark Patterson	Riley Mk.XI-Lexus	DP	733	2	2
2008	Michael Shank Racing	Oswaldo Negri Jr. Mark Patterson; Graham Rahal	Riley Mk.XI-Ford	DP	680	6	6
2010	Chip Ganassi Racing with Felix Sabates	Max Papis; Scott Pruett; Memo Rojas	Riley Mk.XI-BMW	DP	755	2	2
2011	Michael Shank Racing with Curb/Agajanian	A. J. Allmendinger; Michael McDowell	Dallara Ford	DP	719	7	7
2012	Michael Shank Racing with Curb/Agajanian	A. J. Allmendinger; Oswaldo Negri Jr. John Pew	Riley Mk.XXVI-Ford	DP	761	1	1
2013	Michael Shank Racing	A. J. Allmendinger; Marcos Ambrose; Oswaldo Negri Jr. John Pew	Riley Mk.XXVI-Ford	DP	709	3	3
2014	Michael Shank Racing with Curb/Agajanian	A. J. Allmendinger; Oswaldo Negri Jr. John Pew	Riley Mk.XXVI-Ford EcoBoost	P	599	47	12

=== Complete Formula E results ===
Year	Team	Car	1	2	3	4	5	6	7	8	9	10	11	Pos	Points
2014–15	Andretti Autosport	Spark-Renault SRT 01E	BEI	PUT	PDE	BNA	MIA	LBH	MCO	BER	MSC; 10	LDN	LDN	25th	1

== Notes ==
Sporting positions
Preceded by Inaugural	Formula Palmer Audi; Champion; 1998	Succeeded by Richard Tarling
Preceded by Bruno Junqueira	International Formula 3000; Champion; 2001	Succeeded by Sébastien Bourdais

Preceded by Dan Wheldon	Fatalities in Champ Car/IndyCar; 2015	Succeeded by None
