= 2008 Detroit Indy Grand Prix =

(United States) 2008 Detroit Indy Grand Prix
Race details
- 16th round of the 2008 IndyCar Series season
- Date: August 31, 2008
- Official name: Detroit Indy Grand Prix presented by Firestone
- Location: Detroit Belle Isle street circuit
- Course: Temporary street circuit 2.07 mi / 3.33 km
- Distance: 87 laps 180.09 mi / 289.82 km
- Scheduled Distance: 90 laps 186.30 mi / 299.82 km
- Weather: Temperatures reaching up to 86 °F (30 °C); wind speeds up to 10.2 miles per hour (16.4 km/h)

Pole position
- Driver: (New Zealand) Scott Dixon (Chip Ganassi Racing)
- Time: 1:12.2861

Podium
- First: (United Kingdom) Justin Wilson (Newman/Haas/Lanigan Racing)
- Second: (Brazil) Hélio Castroneves (Team Penske)
- Third: (Brazil) Tony Kanaan (Andretti Green Racing)

The 2008 Detroit Indy Grand Prix presented by Firestone was an IndyCar Series race that was held on August 31, 2008, on the Raceway on Belle Isle in Detroit, Michigan. It was the sixteenth race of the 2008 IndyCar Series season. Originally scheduled to run over 90 laps, it was shortened to 87 laps due to 2-hour limit. The race was won by Justin Wilson for the Newman/Haas/Lanigan Racing team. Hélio Castroneves finished second, and Tony Kanaan clinched third. Wilson dedicated his win to actor Paul Newman, the ailing joint-owner of his team; Newman died less than a month later.

Scott Dixon claimed pole position for the race, and led through the first lap. Dixon and Castroneves, who had qualified second, pulled away from the pack, until the seventeenth lap, when a full-track caution was issued after an incident between Dan Wheldon and Jamie Camara. Dixon pitted under the yellow, but did so alone, granting the lead to Castroneves. The Brazilian led the race until lap 72, other than a single lap during which Oriol Servià was leading during pit stops. Late in the race, Wilson was challenging for the lead, and Castroneves was judged to have blocked the other driver, resulting in a penalty which allowed Wilson to take the lead. Despite a late push by Castroneves to pass Wilson, the rookie British driver maintained his position to claim victory.

There were four cautions, totalling 11 laps during the race. It was Wilson's first career IndyCar win. Of the 25 drivers that started, 18 completed the race, three retired after contact, one retired with handling problems and three retired due to mechanical issues.

== Classification ==
=== Race results ===
Pos	No.	Driver	Team	Chassis/Engine/Tires	Laps	Time/Retired	Grid	Laps Led	Points^{1}
1	02	Justin Wilson (R)	Newman/Haas/Lanigan Racing	Dallara/Honda/Firestone	87	2:00:10.7618	4	15	50
2	3	Hélio Castroneves	Team Penske	Dallara/Honda/Firestone	87	+4.4058	2	53	43
3	11	Tony Kanaan	Andretti Green Racing	Dallara/Honda/Firestone	87	+17.6815	8	0	35
4	5	Oriol Servià	KV Racing Technology	Dallara/Honda/Firestone	87	+26.5468	3	1	32
5	9	Scott Dixon	Chip Ganassi Racing	Dallara/Honda/Firestone	87	+27.7185	1	18	30
6	17	Ryan Hunter-Reay	Rahal Letterman Racing	Dallara/Honda/Firestone	87	+28.2688	7	0	28
7	18	Bruno Junqueira	Dale Coyne Racing	Dallara/Honda/Firestone	87	+28.6815	24	0	26
8	8	Will Power (R)	KV Racing Technology	Dallara/Honda/Firestone	87	+28.6815	12	0	24
9	6	Ryan Briscoe	Team Penske	Dallara/Honda/Firestone	87	+35.5244	5	0	22
10	2	A. J. Foyt IV	Vision Racing	Dallara/Honda/Firestone	87	+38.1040	17	0	20
11	27	Hideki Mutoh (R)	Andretti Green Racing	Dallara/Honda/Firestone	87	+38.3811	16	0	19
12	14	Darren Manning	A. J. Foyt Racing	Dallara/Honda/Firestone	87	+44.6662	15	0	18
13	06	Graham Rahal (R)	Newman/Haas/Lanigan Racing	Dallara/Honda/Firestone	87	+47.8028	6	0	17
14	20	Ed Carpenter	Vision Racing	Dallara/Honda/Firestone	87	+1:01.2771	20	0	16
15	19	Mario Moraes	Dale Coyne Racing	Dallara/Honda/Firestone	86	+1 Lap	19	0	15
16	7	Danica Patrick	Andretti Green Racing	Dallara/Honda/Firestone	86	+1 Lap	10	0	14
17	4	Vítor Meira	Panther Racing	Dallara/Honda/Firestone	83	+4 Laps	14	0	13
18	26	Marco Andretti	Andretti Green Racing	Dallara/Honda/Firestone	81	Mechanical	13	0	12
19	15	Buddy Rice	Dreyer & Reinbold Racing	Dallara/Honda/Firestone	76	Mechanical	18	0	12
20	10	Dan Wheldon	Chip Ganassi Racing	Dallara/Honda/Firestone	64	Contact	11	0	12
21	12	Tomas Scheckter	Luczo Dragon Racing	Dallara/Honda/Firestone	56	+31 Laps	26	0	12
22	36	Alex Tagliani	Conquest Racing	Dallara/Honda/Firestone	54	Mechanical	21	0	12
23	23	Milka Duno	Dreyer & Reinbold Racing	Dallara/Honda/Firestone	46	Mechanical	23	0	12
24	33	E. J. Viso	HVM Racing	Dallara/Honda/Firestone	32	Contact	9	0	12
25	34	Jaime Camara (R)	Conquest Racing	Dallara/Honda/Firestone	16	Contact	22	0	10
26	25	Marty Roth	Roth Racing	Dallara/Honda/Firestone	0	DNS	25	0	5
Source: Racing-Reference

== Standings after the race ==
Drivers' Championship

Pos	Driver	Points
1	Scott Dixon	606
2	Helio Castroneves	576
3	Tony Kanaan	481
4	Dan Wheldon	464
5	Ryan Briscoe	412
Source: Racing-Reference

Previous race: 2008 Peak Antifreeze Indy Grand Prix	IndyCar Series; 2008 season	Next race: 2008 Peak Antifreeze Indy 300
Previous race: 2007 Detroit Indy Grand Prix	Detroit Indy Grand Prix	Next race: 2012 Detroit Indy Grand Prix
