= 2012 Chevrolet Detroit Belle Isle Grand Prix =

(United States) 2012 Detroit Indy Grand Prix
Race details
- 6th round of the 2012 IndyCar Series season
- Date: June 3, 2012
- Official name: Chevrolet Detroit Belle Isle Grand Prix presented by ShopAutoWeek.com
- Location: Detroit Belle Isle street circuit
- Course: Temporary street circuit 2.07 mi / 3.33 km
- Distance: 60 laps 125.76 mi / 202.33 km
- Scheduled Distance: 90 laps 188.64 mi / 303.5 km
- Weather: Temperatures reaching up to 79 °F (26 °C); wind speeds up to 19 miles per hour (31 km/h)

Pole position
- Driver: (New Zealand) Scott Dixon (Chip Ganassi Racing)
- Time: 1:10.3162

Fastest lap
- Driver: (United Kingdom) Justin Wilson (Dale Coyne Racing)
- Time: 1:12.0651 (on lap 9 of 60)

Podium
- First: (New Zealand) Scott Dixon (Chip Ganassi Racing)
- Second: (United Kingdom) Dario Franchitti (Chip Ganassi Racing)
- Third: (France) Simon Pagenaud (Sam Schmidt Motorsports)

The 2012 Chevrolet Detroit Belle Isle Grand Prix presented by ShopAutoWeek.com was an IZOD IndyCar Series race that was held on June 3, 2012, on The Raceway on Belle Isle in Detroit, Michigan. It was the sixth race of the 2012 IZOD IndyCar Series season. Originally scheduled to run over 90 laps, it was shortened to 60 laps. The race was won by Scott Dixon for the Chip Ganassi Racing team. Dario Franchitti finished second, and Simon Pagenaud clinched third.

Preparations for the race were overshadowed by speculation over IndyCar CEO Randy Bernard's job, after he tweeted that some team owners were trying to get him fired. Dixon claimed pole position for the race, the first IndyCar event in Detroit since 2008, and maintained his lead throughout the race. After 38 laps, James Hinchcliffe hit a dislodged piece of the track and continued straight into the tire wall. Further investigation discovered that the track was disintegrating in various places, and the event was red flagged. After a two-hour break, in which track officials ripped out the damaged sections of track and filled the holes with concrete, the race was restarted, shortened to 60 laps. Rain also started to fall lightly, and shortly after the restart a caution was issued when Hélio Castroneves spun. Dario Franchitti gained four places after the red flag, benefiting from his softer red tires, to finish second behind his teammate.

There were four cautions, totalling 12 laps during the race. It was Dixon's first win of the season and the 28th of his career, which moved him up to second in the drivers' standings. Of the 25 drivers that started, 19 completed the race, two retired after contact and four retired due to mechanical issues. Justin Wilson recorded the fastest lap of the race, completing a circuit in 1:12.0651.

== Background ==
The IndyCar series had not visited Detroit since 2008, when Justin Wilson won the race after taking the lead in the last 20 laps when Hélio Castroneves was penalized for blocking him. The following year's scheduled race was cancelled due to lack of funding, and the failure to secure sponsorship for the event. In September 2011, the Detroit City Council approved plans for the race to be held on the weekend of June 1–3, 2012. A month later, it was confirmed that the race would be run in 2012, sponsored by the Chevrolet arm of Detroit-based manufacturer General Motors.

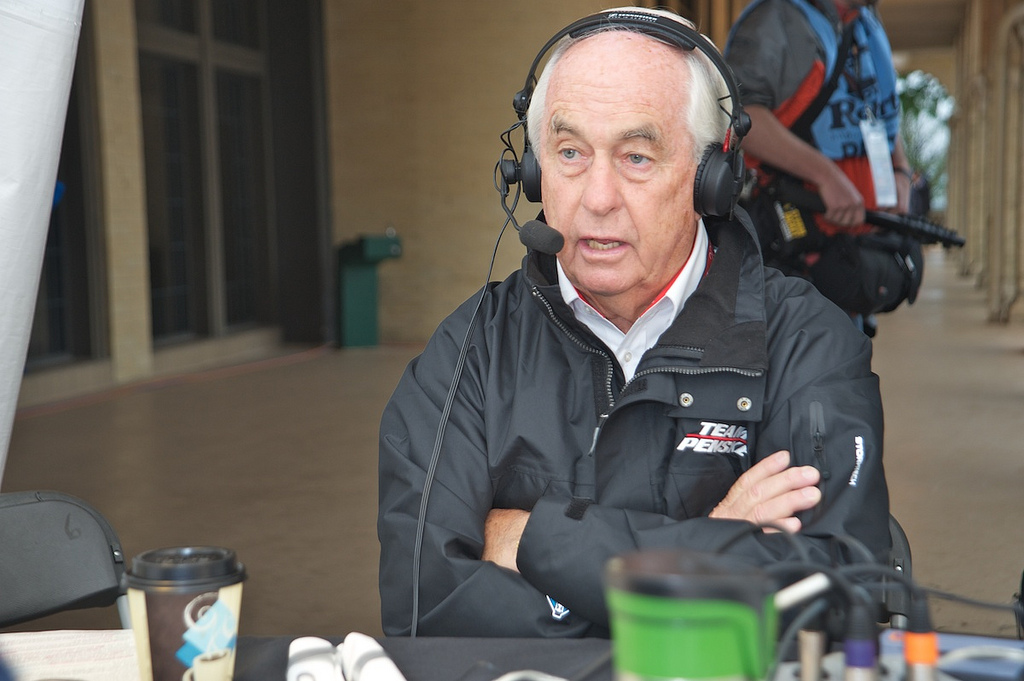
Roger Penske was instrumental in the return of IndyCar to Detroit.

Roger Penske was one of the main advocates of the series returning to Detroit, and his company provided $6 million to improve the course on Belle Isle Park. Over 600,000 square feet (56,000 m^{2}) of concrete was laid down across the paddock and the race course, and the lighting and drainage were both repaired in the lead up to the event. The race was scheduled for the weekend after the Indianapolis 500, a slot that had previously been held by the Firestone 550 at the Texas Motor Speedway. The move created tension with Eddie Gossage, the track director in Texas.

Prior to the race, Will Power was the points leader, with 200 points, while Castroneves and James Hinchcliffe each had 164 points to place second and third respectively. The configuration was the 2.07 miles (3.33 km) long track used in 2007 and 2008. It is a tight street course on which overtaking is difficult, and previewing the race, Tony DiZinno claimed it had "often been a mundane race." Four racers participating in the 2012 event were previous winners on the course: Castroneves, Dario Franchitti, Tony Kanaan and Wilson. In contrast, 11 of the 25 drivers had not previously participated in an IndyCar race at Belle Isle, and four of the drivers had only competed once: in the 2008 race.

The previous weekend's Indianapolis 500 had, according to an agency report, been "a breathtaking event, the kind that’s certain to be talked about through the years", and provided a boost to the series, with the race receiving its highest Nielsen rating since 2008. The series hoped to maintain that momentum into the Detroit race, but instead focus shifted to off-track issues when the series' CEO, Randy Bernard posted a message on Twitter claiming that some of the team owners were trying to oust him. The coup was based upon the owners' disgruntlement with the increasing cost of the Dallara DW12 chassis, and fines given out for the use of unapproved parts in races earlier in the season. Bernard spoke to the team owners on the Saturday prior to the Detroit race, and reported that the matter was settled, in an attempt to place attention back on the race, but by that stage, the media had spent Friday and Saturday investigating the coup, rather than previewing the race and the track.

== Practice and qualifying ==
Two practice sessions were held on the Friday before the race: each lasted for an hour. A third session, also an hour long, took place on the Saturday morning prior to qualifying. The first session provided limited opportunities to the drivers due to heavy rain and standing water on the course. As a result, only 11 of the 25 entrants participated in the session, of which Takuma Sato set the fastest time. Conditions improved during the second practice, and all 25 drivers set times. Will Power was quickest; marginally over a tenth of a second faster than Wilson. Ryan Briscoe, Simon Pagenaud and Tony Kanaan completed the top five, all recording times within half a second of Power. In the third practice, Scott Dixon recorded the fastest time, trailed by Power and Ryan Hunter-Reay. Briscoe and Wilson also lapped the track in under 72 seconds to finish among the five quickest drivers.

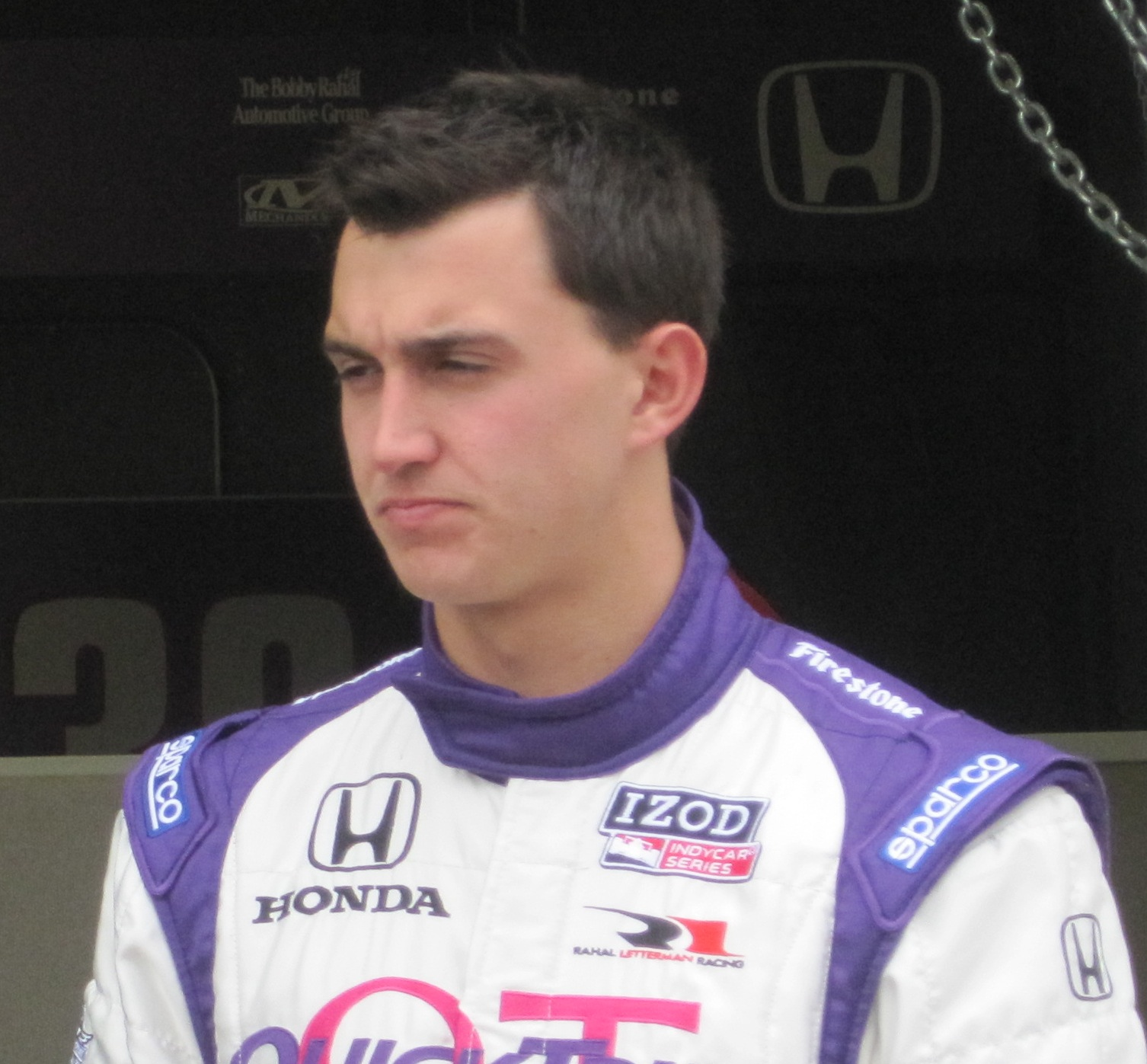
Graham Rahal missed out on reaching the Firestone Fast Six by just four thousandths of a second.

Qualifying took place over three rounds: the drivers were split into two groups for the first round, in which the top six from each group progressed to the next round. Dixon was the fastest from the first group, followed by Pagenaud and Hunter-Reay within half a second of his time. Wilson, Sébastien Bourdais and Sato were the other drivers to advance to the second round. In the second group, Power set the fastest overall time in the first round, and Alex Tagliani was close behind him, also setting a faster time than Dixon. Graham Rahal, E. J. Viso, Hélio Castroneves and Briscoe also qualified for the next stage. Power was once again the fastest driver in the second round, leading Dixon and Tagliani. The top-three drivers were separated by less than a tenth of a second. The other three drivers to continue to the third round, the "Firestone Fast Six", were Pagenaud, Viso and Hunter-Reay. Rahal, who finished in seventh was just four thousandths of a second behind Hunter-Reay.

The top six drivers were split evenly by engine; half running Honda engines, and the other half Chevrolet. It was also the first time in the 2012 season that six different teams were represented in the third qualifying round. Hunter-Reay and Power traded fastest times early in the session before Pagenaud and Viso went quicker. Power and Dixon then set times under 71 seconds, and then improved upon their own laps to finish as the top-two. Dixon set the fastest time; 1:10.3162: just four thousandths of a second quicker than Power. Tagliani was third, joined on the second row by Pagenaud, while Viso and Hunter-Reay qualified on the third row of the grid. Rahal and Simona de Silvestro were both subject to ten-place grid penalties for engine changes made in mid-May, dropping them to 17th and 25th on the grid respectively. Rubens Barrichello was also given a ten-place penalty for changing his chassis between qualifying and the race, placing him 24th.

=== Qualifying classification ===
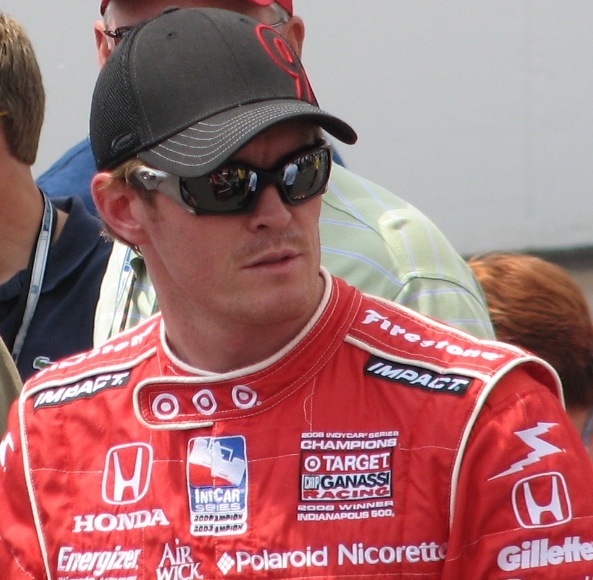
Scott Dixon qualified first, and led the race throughout to record his first win of 2012.

Final qualifying results
Grid	No.	Name	Round 1	Round 2	Round 3	Pos
1	9	Scott Dixon	1:11.0332	1:10.5117	1:10.3162	1
2	12	Will Power	1:10.7900	1:10.4977	1:10.3206	2
3	98	Alex Tagliani	1:10.8193	1:10.5765	1:10.6684	3
4	77	Simon Pagenaud	1:11.4451	1:10.7050	1:10.8426	4
5	5	E. J. Viso	1:11.2637	1:10.9312	1:11.0852	5
6	28	Ryan Hunter-Reay	1:11.4888	1:10.9398	1:11.4557	6
7	2	Ryan Briscoe	1:11.5877	1:10.9964	–	8
8	3	Hélio Castroneves	1:11.3477	1:11.0076	–	9
9	7	Sébastien Bourdais	1:11.8125	1:11.1624	–	10
10	18	Justin Wilson	1:11.5936	1:11.3376	–	11
11	15	Takuma Sato	1:12.0913	1:11.8122	–	12
12	67	Josef Newgarden	1:12.1068	–	–	13
13	27	James Hinchcliffe	1:11.6519	–	–	14
14	10	Dario Franchitti	1:12.3276	–	–	15
15	14	Mike Conway	1:11.6521	–	–	16
16	22	Oriol Servià	1:12.5754	–	–	17
17	38	Graham Rahal	1:11.0627	1:10.9434	–	7 †
18	11	Tony Kanaan	1:11.8080	–	–	18
19	4	J. R. Hildebrand	1:12.5835	–	–	19
20	83	Charlie Kimball	1:12.5844	–	–	21
21	20	Ed Carpenter	1:14.8816	–	–	23
22	26	Marco Andretti	1:12.6531	–	–	24
23	19	James Jakes	1:12.8469	–	–	25
24	8	Rubens Barrichello	1:12.4052	–	–	20 ‡
25	78	Simona de Silvestro	1:12.6014	–	–	22 †
† Rahal and de Silvestro penalised 10 places for changing engine. ‡ Barrichello penalised 10 places for changing chassis.

== Race ==
The race, the sixth of the season, began at 3:30 p.m. EST, and was televised live in the United States on ABC. Scott Dixon held his lead from pole position, with Will Power behind him. Justin Wilson made light contact with a wall during the first lap of the race, and pitted shortly after due to a flat right-rear tire. The team discovered additional damage to the suspension that required lengthy repairs, but he was able to return to the race. During the fifth lap, some teams reported that parts of the track were deteriorating, but it was not felt that any action needed to be taken. Three laps later, Rubens Barrichello, who had gained four places started suffering mechanical problems, which forced him to retire from the race after eleven laps. Wilson set the fastest lap of the race during the ninth lap, completing a circuit in 1 minute 12.0651 seconds. On lap 10, Ryan Hunter-Reay blocked Ryan Briscoe from passing him, drawing a warning from race director Beaux Barfield. Sébastien Bourdais, who, along with Alex Tagliani and Oriol Servia, was running his first street race of the season without a Lotus engine, had made it to seventh before suffering mechanical problems which curtailed his race after 24 laps. James Jakes, who was suffering from problems with his brakes throughout the early part of the race eventually retired on lap 36, having spent ten laps in the pits earlier trying to resolve the issue.

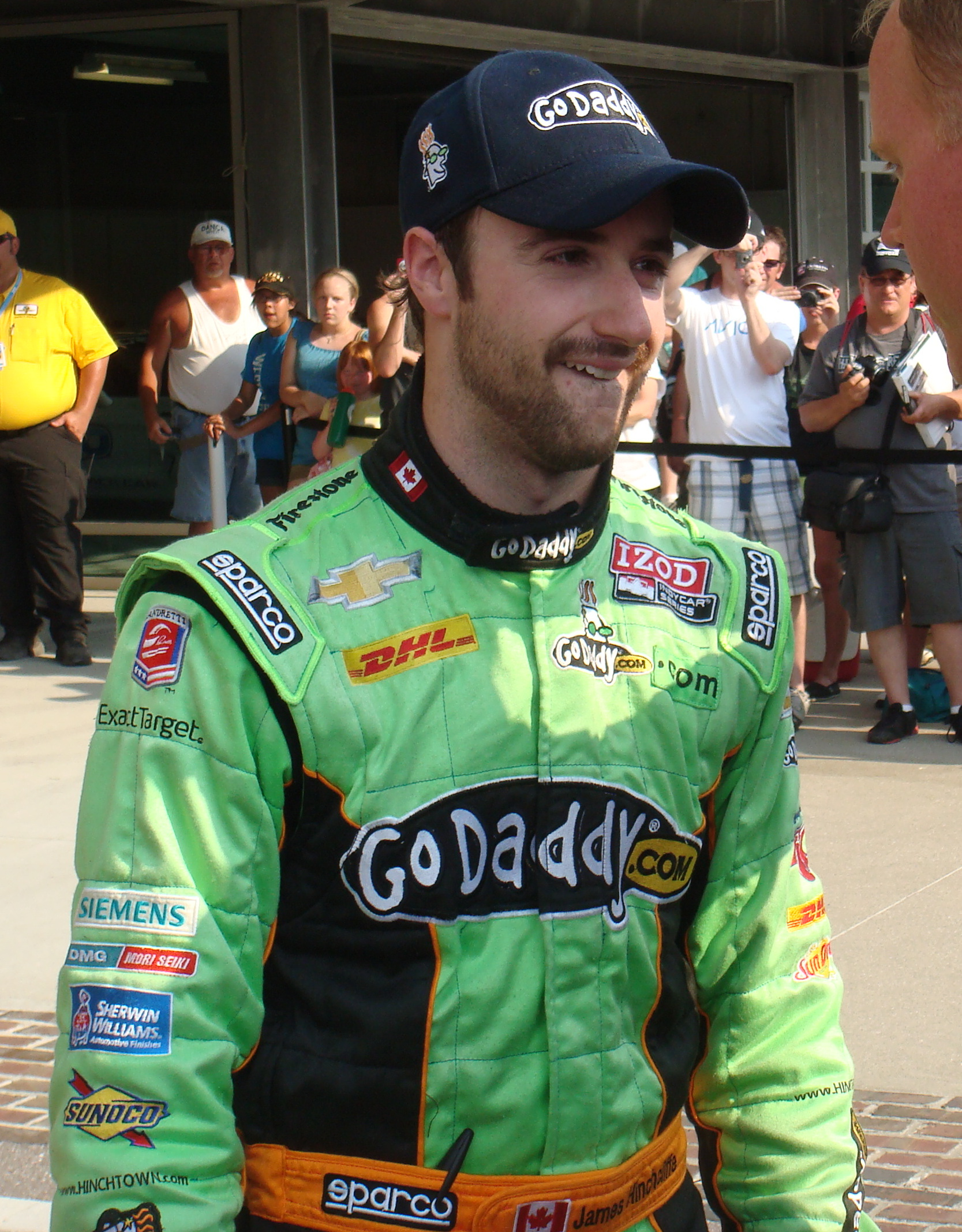
James Hinchcliffe struck track debris on lap 39, forcing his retirement and a red flag.

On lap 39, James Hinchcliffe fell victim to the deteriorating track. Going through turn six, he struck a large piece of asphalt that had lifted from the track. After hitting his front wing, it then went under the car and propelled it into the air. With no traction, Hinchcliffe was unable to control his car and was sent into the tire wall. Hinchcliffe was angry after the race, and claimed that the track should have been fixed earlier: "The fact that (race control) let it go as far as they did, essentially waiting for someone to crash as a result of it before they did something, is very unsafe." He said that the track had lifted much earlier in the race, but that the drivers had been forced to keep avoiding the debris, which was on the racing line. On the same lap, Takuma Sato clipped the curb going into turn 12 and lost control of his car before hitting the wall, forcing his retirement. The two crashes drew a full track caution, and the cars drove behind the safety car for six laps before a red flag was given on lap 45.

The track had been patched up prior to the weekend's racing using a synthetic rubber compound, and it had remained secure throughout the practice and qualifying sessions, as well as the Grand-Am and Indy Lights races. However, the Dallara DW12's aerodynamic ground force effects acted to pull the compound out. After assessing the track conditions, the decision was made to attempt to repair the track and restart the race. Marshalls and track workers started to pull the loose strips up from the track, and a quick drying concrete was used to fill the troughs. The repairs were held up for a short time when a crew was despatched to collect more of the concrete, as the on-site resources had been used up, but eventually the race director was happy the race could restart. Kanaan and Power drove around to survey the repairs, acting as driver representatives, and although Kanaan particularly did not sound confident that they would hold up, they agreed to try and continue racing. There was some confusion about the rules of the restart; no repairs were allowed, and the teams could change tires, but had to remain on the same compound. This led to J. R. Hildebrand suffering a one lap penalty as his car required repair work, and a number of drivers being angered at having to stay on the harder tires, which were the slower compound.

After a two-hour delay, the race was restarted. Rahal suffered clutch problems on the restart, which placed him two laps down, while the other drivers ran behind the safety car, during which the marshalls showed the areas in which repair work had been conducted. Just prior to the restart, there was a short rain shower which made the track slightly slippery. Power lost one position on the restart, dropping to third. Franchitti, who was the closest driver to the front to have the softer compound red tires fitted gained two positions on the restart, moving up to fourth. The restart only lasted for six corners, before Castroneves spun in the wet conditions, and was then struck by Ed Carpenter. On the next corner, Josef Newgarden had slid into the wall and stalled, and a full-track caution was again called. The race was restarted with nine laps remaining, and Franchitti once more gained a position, passing Pagenaud to gain second. However, the race was almost immediately under a yellow flag again as E. J. Viso was spun by Marco Andretti, and stalled in the middle of turn four. From the ensuing restart, Dixon managed to maintain the lead from Franchitti, and the two Chip Ganassi Racing drivers completed a second successive one-two finish.

=== Race results ===
Final race classification
Pos	No.	Driver	Team	Engine	Laps	Time/Retired	Grid	Laps Led	Points^{1}
1	9	Scott Dixon	Chip Ganassi Racing	Honda	60	1:27:39.5053	1	60	53
2	10	Dario Franchitti	Chip Ganassi Racing	Honda	60	+ 1.9628	14	0	40
3	77	Simon Pagenaud (R)	Schmidt Hamilton Motorsports	Honda	60	+ 2.4773	4	0	35
4	12	Will Power	Team Penske	Chevrolet	60	+ 3.5435	2	0	32
5	22	Oriol Servià	Panther/Dreyer & Reinbold Racing	Chevrolet	60	+ 9.6619	16	0	30
6	11	Tony Kanaan	KV Racing Technology	Chevrolet	60	+ 10.1676	18	0	28
7	28	Ryan Hunter-Reay	Andretti Autosport	Chevrolet	60	+ 10.6455	6	0	26
8	83	Charlie Kimball	Chip Ganassi Racing	Honda	60	+ 11.1048	20	0	24
9	14	Mike Conway	A. J. Foyt Enterprises	Honda	60	+ 11.5315	15	0	22
10	98	Alex Tagliani	Team Barracuda – BHA	Honda	60	+ 12.5688	3	0	20
11	26	Marco Andretti	Andretti Autosport	Chevrolet	60	+ 24.5855	22	0	19
12	20	Ed Carpenter	Ed Carpenter Racing	Chevrolet	60	+ 26.6600	21	0	18
13	78	Simona de Silvestro	HVM Racing	Lotus	60	+ 28.4369	25	0	17
14	4	J. R. Hildebrand	Panther Racing	Chevrolet	59	+ 1 lap †	19	0	16
15	67	Josef Newgarden (R)	Sarah Fisher Hartman Racing	Honda	59	+ 1 lap	12	0	15
16	2	Ryan Briscoe	Team Penske	Chevrolet	59	+ 1 lap	7	0	14
17	3	Hélio Castroneves	Team Penske	Chevrolet	59	+ 1 lap	8	0	13
18	5	E. J. Viso	KV Racing Technology	Chevrolet	59	+ 1 lap	5	0	12
19	38	Graham Rahal	Chip Ganassi Racing	Honda	58	+ 2 laps	17	0	12
20	15	Takuma Sato	Rahal Letterman Lanigan Racing	Honda	38	Contact	11	0	12
21	27	James Hinchcliffe	Andretti Autosport	Chevrolet	38	Contact	13	0	12
22	18	Justin Wilson	Dale Coyne Racing	Honda	28	Mechanical	10	0	12
23	19	James Jakes	Dale Coyne Racing	Honda	26	Mechanical	23	0	12
24	7	Sébastien Bourdais	Dragon Racing	Chevrolet	24	Mechanical	9	0	12
25	8	Rubens Barrichello	KV Racing Technology	Chevrolet	11	Mechanical	24	0	10
† Hildebrand penalised 1 lap for receiving service during the red-flag period. Source: IndyCar

Notes: ^{1} Points include 1 point for pole position and 2 points for most laps led.

== Post-race ==
The race, which was moved from ABC to ESPNEWS because of the red flag delay, averaged 843,189 viewers, earning a 0.6 Nielsen rating. The final ten laps were significantly lower, averaging just 157,137 viewers. Bud Denker, the chairman of the Detroit Grand Prix Association announced shortly after the race that the track would be improved and lengthened for 2013. He suggested that most of the track around turn ten would be removed and relaid, and significant work would be carried out in turns five, six, seven, eleven and twelve. The track would be extended between turns two and five, using a long straight which would allow cars to reach 175–180 miles per hour. The result of the alterations would be an additional 0.4 miles (0.64 km) of track, creating a 2.5 miles (4.0 km) circuit.

== Standings after the race ==
Drivers' Championship
Pos	Driver	Points
1	Will Power	232
2	Scott Dixon	206
3	Helio Castroneves	177
4	Dario Franchitti	176
5	James Hinchcliffe	176
Source: Racing-Reference

Manufacturers' Championship
Pos	Manufacturer	Points
1	Chevrolet	48
2	Honda	42
3	Lotus	24
Source: Honda

- Note: Only the top five positions are included for the driver standings.

Previous race: Indianapolis 500	IndyCar Series; 2012 season	Next race: Firestone 550
Previous race: 2008	Detroit Indy Grand Prix	Next race: 2013
