= Juan Cáceres (racing driver) =

Uruguayan racing driver (born 1984)

- Nationality: (Uruguay) Uruguayan
- Born: Juan Ignacio Cáceres Stuart; 1 May 1984 (age 42) Punta del Este, Maldonado, Uruguay
- Relatives: Maite Cáceres (sister)

TC2000 Championship career
- Debut season: 2007
- Starts: 20
- Championships: 0
- Wins: 0
- Poles: 0
- Fastest laps: 0
- Best finish: 8th in 2008

Previous series
- 2010 2005-2006 2006 2004 2003 2003 2001 2001-2002: Top Race; Euroseries 3000; Champ Car World Series; Spanish F3 Championship; Zip Formula Great Britain; Formula BMW Junior Cup Iberia; Formula Renault 2.0 Italia; Formula Super Renault Argentina

Championship titles
- 2003: Formula BMW Junior Cup Iberia

Juan Ignacio "Fufi" Cáceres Stuart (born 1 May 1984) is a Uruguayan former racing driver from Punta del Este.

Cáceres had a Formula One test with Minardi in 2005 and one-race appearance in Champ Car World Series with Dale Coyne Racing. He later raced in the TC2000 touring car series in Argentina.

== Racing career ==
Cáceres started his career in go-karting in 1995, competing in the Cadetes division of the Uruguayan Karting Championship. In 1996, he won the Copa Mercosur and Campeonato de Verano titles, and finished third in the Uruguayan Karting Championship. The following year, he moved to the 125 cc Pre-Junior category, finishing fifth in 1997 and fourth in 1998. The same year, he enrolled at José Valentin Bianchi's RAC driver academy, in Buenos Aires, Argentina. Cáceres remained in Argentina in 1999, competing in the Fórmula Honda, but did not win a single race.

=== Move to Europe and North America ===
In 2000, Cáceres competed in the United States-based Skip Barber Formula Dodge Midwestern Regional Championship, where he won one race at Road America. Cáceres began racing in Europe in 2001. He participated in Italian Formula Renault for ADM Junior Team and in the Argentine Formula Super Renault, without much success. He competed in Argentina for a second season in 2002.

In 2003, Cáceres won the Formula BMW Junior Cup, with four wins in six races. He also took part in the British Zip Formula championship. In the same year, Cáceres drove a Benetton B201 at a test session at the Circuit de Catalunya, his first experience driving a Formula One car. He was signed by Giancarlo Minardi to be part of his driver academy.

The 2004 season saw Cáceres progress to the higher-tier Spanish Formula Three. Driving a Dallara F300-Toyota car, he finished 14th in the Drivers' Championship with ten points. His best result was a sixth-place finish at Estoril.

Going into 2005, Cáceres moved to the Italian Formula 3000 Championship driving a Lola B99/50 chassis for GP Racing. He took one podium, a third-place finish at Brno, for fifth position in the championship, scoring 20 points. Giancarlo Minardi stated that the Uruguayan driver had a lot of potential and his F3000 performances were "very good."

==== Formula One testing ====
Cáceres tested for Minardi in a PS05 car at Vallelunga in November 2005. He drove a total 32 laps with the, topping the table with a lap time of 1:21.019.

For 2006, Cáceres remained in the Italian Formula 3000, now renamed Euroseries 3000. He took two second-place finishes at Spa and Silverstone for seventh in the Drivers' Championship. In September 2006, he tested for Dale Coyne Racing at Sebring. He took part in a single round of the 2006 Champ Car season, replacing Mario Domínguez in the Grand Prix of Road America, where he qualified and finished last.

== Complete Champ Car results ==
(key)

Year	Team	No.	1	2	3	4	5	6	7	8	9	10	11	12	13	14	Rank	Points	Ref
2006	Dale Coyne Racing	19	LBH	HOU	MTY	MIL	POR	CLE	TOR	EDM	SJO	DEN	MTL	ROA; 15	SRF	MXC	25th	6	
