= Andreas Wirth =

German racing driver

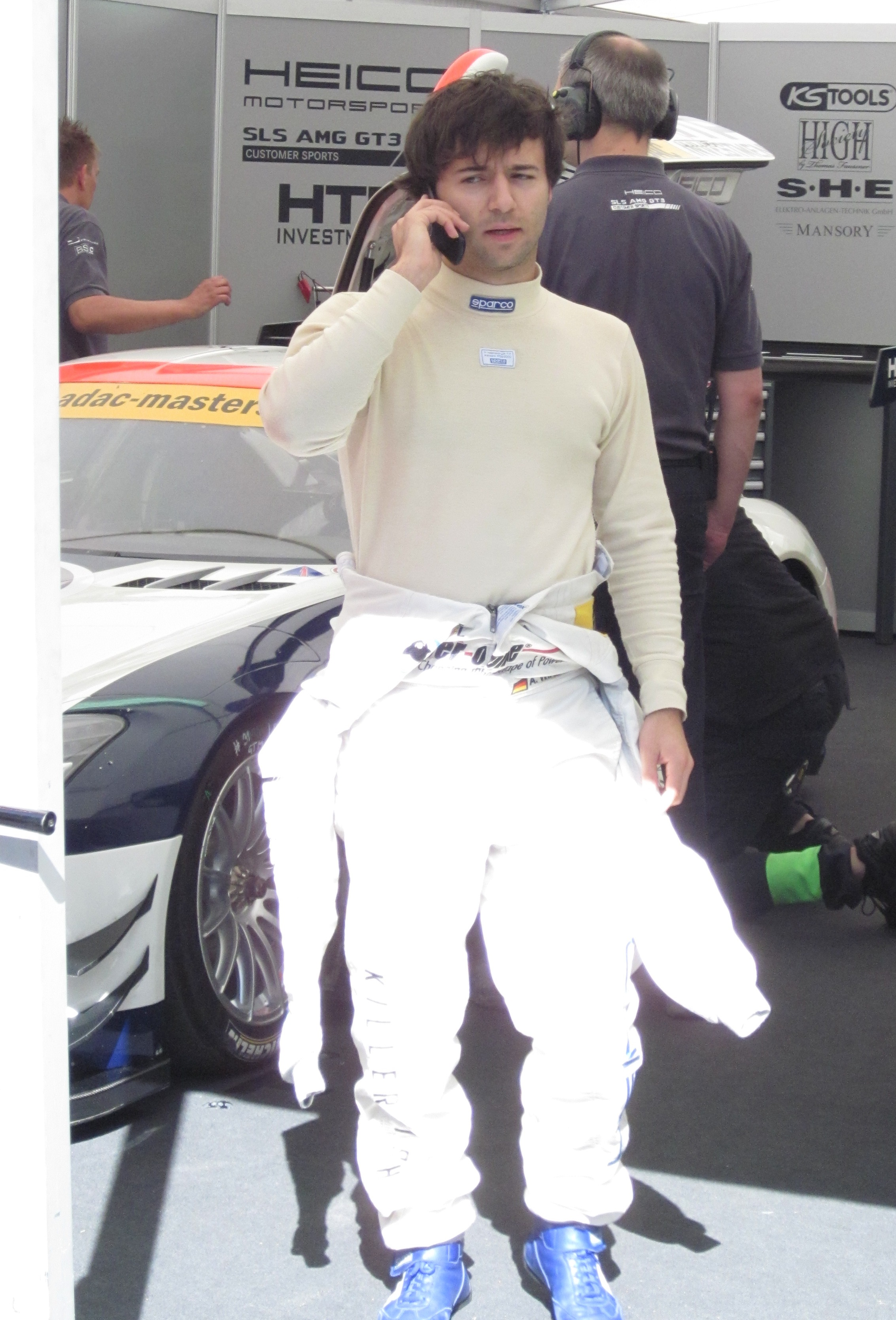
- Wirth in 2011
- Nationality: (Germany) German
- Born: November 19, 1984 (age 41) Heidelberg, West Germany
- Categorisation: FIA Silver

Previous series
- 1998–2000 2001 2002–2003 2004 2005–06, 08 2006 2009–2015 2016: Karting; German Formula Ford; Formula BMW ADAC; Formula BMW USA; Atlantic Championship; Champ Car; ADAC GT Masters; European Le Mans Series

Championship titles
- 2004: Formula BMW USA

Andreas Wirth (born 19 November 1984 in Heidelberg) is a German racing driver. In 2004 Wirth won the Formula BMW USA championship after coming state-side, and then advanced to the Champ Car Atlantics in 2005 where he raced for two years, winning three races and finishing sixth and third in the championship.

Following up a full 2006 season in Atlantics, Wirth was named to compete in his first Champ Car race in Dale Coyne Racing's entry at Surfer's Paradise, where he finished in ninth place. He then went on to race with Coyne in Mexico City. In 2008, he ran in the Petit Le Mans with PTG Panoz.

For seven seasons, Wirth competed in the ADAC GT Masters series where he tallied a total of nine victories. In 2016, Wirth moved into Prototype racing in the European Le Mans Series with SMP Racing in their LMP2-class BR01 with co-drivers Stefano Coletti and Julián Leal.

== Career ==
Wirth began his career in karting in 1998, racing in several junior and senior German Karting series and earning several championships through 2000. In 2001, he placed second in the German Formula Ford Championship, and finished 11th at the Formula Ford Festival at Brands Hatch. He then moved to the Formula BMW ADAC series, finishing ninth in the championship in 2002 and tenth in 2003.

=== American open-wheel racing ===
In 2004, Wirth moved to the United States, winning the inaugural Formula BMW USA championship with four wins and 11 podiums. He competed in the Atlantic Championship in the 2005 and 2006 seasons, winning three times (Denver 2005, Long Beach and Houston 2006) and finishing third in the championship in 2006. Late in 2006, Wirth ran two Champ Car races for Dale Coyne Racing, finishing ninth at Surfers' Paradise and 15th at Mexico City. After sitting out 2007, Wirth competed in three Atlantic races in 2008 and also drove for Panoz Team PTG at the 2008 Petit Le Mans.

=== ADAC GT ===
Wirth returned to Europe in 2009, racing for Alpina in the ADAC GT Masters, winning once with co-driver Jens Klingmann. In 2010, he finished sixth in the championship for s-Berg Racing, winning two races with Martin Matzke. Wirth joined Heico Motorsport in 2011, finishing ninth in the championship and winning one race with co-driver Christiaan Frankenhout.

For the next four seasons, Wirth raced in Callaway Competition's GT3 Chevrolet Corvette. His best season was 2014, where he won four races in a partial season alongside the defending champion Daniel Keilwitz, and placed 6th in the championship.

=== 2016 ===
In 2016, Wirth finished third in the European Le Mans Series LMP2 championship with Stefano Coletti, driving the SMP Racing BR01 prototype.

== Racing record ==
=== American Racing results ===
(key)

==== Atlantic Championship ====
Year	Team	1	2	3	4	5	6	7	8	9	10	11	12	Rank	Points
2005	Brooks Associates Racing	LBH; Ret	MTY; 8	**POR1**; 3	POR2; 2	CLE1; 3	CLE2; 3	TOR; 3	EDM; 3	SJO; 5	DEN; 1	ROA; DNS	MTL	6th	234
2006	Forsythe Racing	**LBH**; 1	HOU; 1	MTY; 6	POR; 3	**CLE1**; 3	CLE2; 18	TOR; Ret	EDM; 3	SJO; 18	DEN; 5	MTL; 12	ROA; 3	3rd	227
2008	Brooks Associates Racing	LBH; 9	LS; 8	MTT; 7	EDM1	EDM2	ROA1	ROA2	TRR	NJ	UTA	ATL		22nd	45

==== Champ Car ====
Year	Team	No.	1	2	3	4	5	6	7	8	9	10	11	12	13	14	Rank	Points	Ref
2006	Dale Coyne Racing	19	LBH	HOU	MTY	MIL	POR	CLE	TOR	EDM	SJO	DEN	MTL	ROA	SRF; 9	MXC; 15	20th	19	

=== ADAC GT Masters ===
Year	Team	Car	Co-Driver	Points	Position
2009	Alpina	Alpina B6 GT3	(Germany) Jens Klingmann	23	14th
2010	s-Berg Racing	Alpina B6 GT3	(Czech Republic) Martin Matzke	44	6th
2011	Heico Motorsport	Mercedes-Benz SLS AMG GT3	(Netherlands) Christiaan Frankenhout	90	9th
2012	Callaway Competition	Corvette Z06.R GT3	(Germany) Heinz-Harald Frentzen	42	19th
2013	Callaway Competition	Corvette Z06.R GT3	(Germany) Christian Hohenadel	19	24th
2014	Callaway Competition	Corvette Z06.R GT3	(Germany) Daniel Keilwitz	118	6th
2015	Callaway Competition	Corvette Z06.R GT3	(Germany) Daniel Keilwitz	104	7th

=== Complete European Le Mans Series results ===
Co-Drivers: Stefano Coletti, Julian Leal, Vitaly Petrov

Year	Entrant	Class	Chassis	Engine	1	2	3	4	5	6	Rank	Points
2016	SMP Racing	LMP2	BR Engineering BR01	Nissan VK45DE 4.5 L V8	SIL; 2	IMO; 4	RBR; 4	LEC; 2	SPA; 6	EST; 3	3rd	83

=== WeatherTech SportsCar Championship ===
(key)(Races in bold indicate pole position, Results are overall/class)

Year	Team	Class	Make	Engine	1	2	3	4	5	6	7	8	9	10	Rank	Points
2016	Panoz DeltaWing Racing	P	DeltaWing DWC13	Élan (Mazda) 1.9 L I4 Turbo	DAY; 12	SEB	LBH	LGA	DET	WGL	MOS	ELK	COA	PET	36th	20

Sporting positions
Preceded by None	Formula BMW USA; Champion; 2004	Succeeded by Richard Philippe
