= 2006 Champ Car World Series =

American motorsport season

2006 Champ Car season
- Bridgestone Presents the Champ Car World Series Powered by Ford

Season
- Races: 14
- Start date: April 9
- End date: November 12

Awards
- Drivers' champion: (France) Sébastien Bourdais
- Nations' Cup: France
- Rookie of the Year: (Australia) Will Power

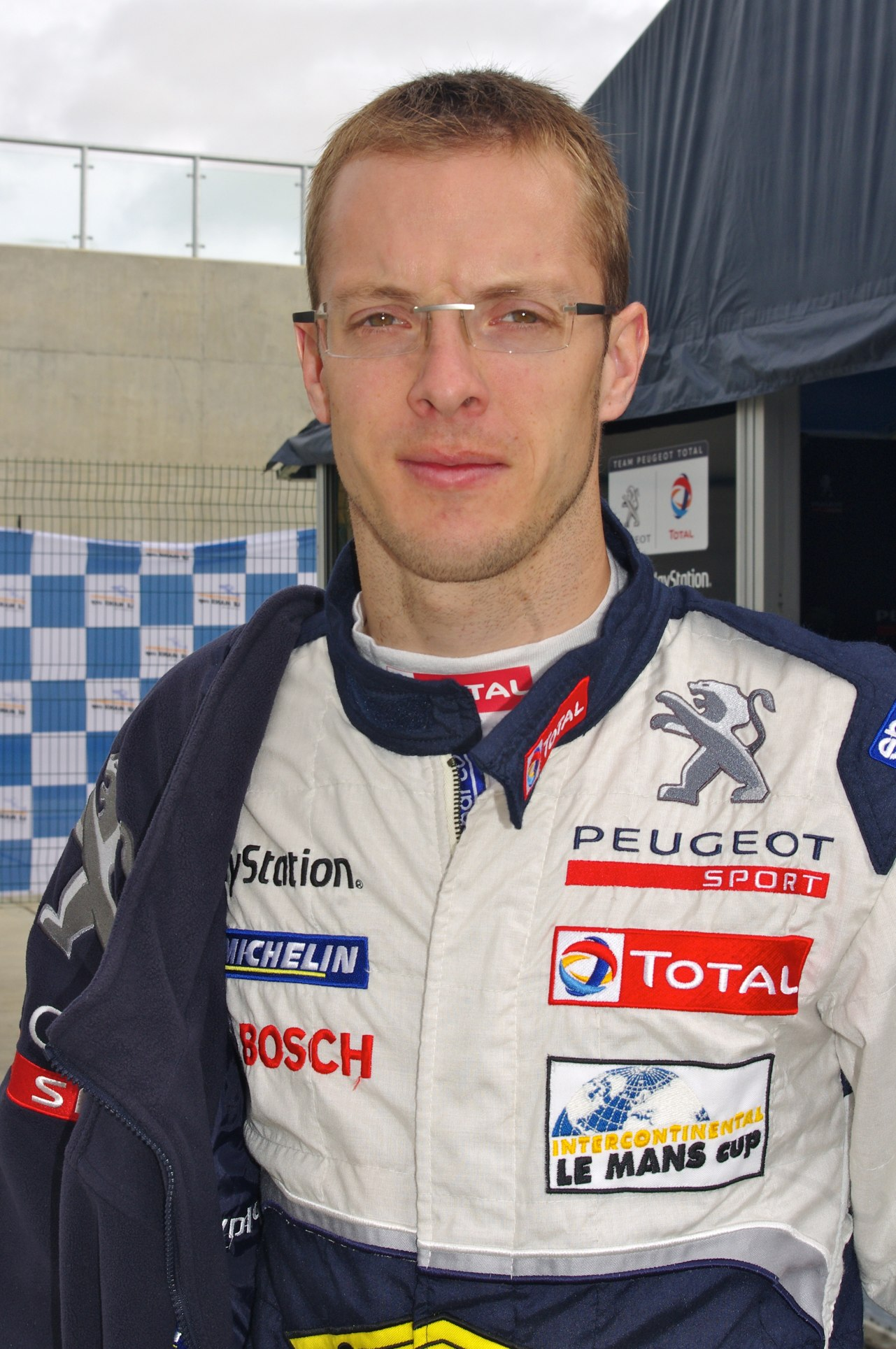
Sébastien Bourdais (pictured in 2011) earned his third consecutive Drivers' Championship.

The 2006 Bridgestone Presents the Champ Car World Series Powered by Ford was an auto racing championship for American open-wheel cars that was sanctioned by Champ Car. It was the 28th season of the Champ Car World Series and it encompassed the 95th national championship season (Note: This refers to the national championship seasons in 1905, 1916, and every year since 1920. The seasons in 1909–1915 and 1917–1919 were retrospectively assigned champions by AAA Contest Board members Arthur Means and Val Haresnape in 1927 and sportswriter Russ Caitlin in 1951, though accredited statisticians do not consider the championships to be official.) alongside the rival IRL IndyCar Series' 2006 season. The season spanned 14 races, beginning in Long Beach, California on April 9 and ending in Mexico City, Mexico on November 12. The Drivers' Championship was won by Sébastien Bourdais of Newman/Haas Racing.

Reigning two-time champion Bourdais won the series championship for the third consecutive time with Newman/Haas Racing, becoming the first driver to win three American open wheel National Championships in a row since Ted Horn in 1948, and the first non-American driver in history to win three titles. For this season the Lola B02/00 chassis (which the series had introduced under its previous CART identity in 2002) continued as the sole chassis for the series for a second consecutive season in what would prove to be the final season of usage for this particular chassis as Champ Car would replace it with a new spec chassis - the Panoz DP01 for 2007. This was also the last CART/Champ Car season prior to the 2008 re-unification of American open-wheel racing to feature a round held on an oval track as the only round on the 2006 Champ Car schedule held on oval at Milwaukee would be dropped for what would prove to be Champ Cars' final season in 2007.

== Teams and drivers ==
The following teams and drivers competed in the 2006 Champ Car World Series (CCWS). All teams competed with the Lola B02/00 chassis, the Ford-Cosworth XFE engine, and tires supplied by Bridgestone.

Team	No.	Driver	Rounds
(United States) Conquest Racing (Note: Conquest Racing was officially entered as "Mi-Jack Conquest Racing".)	27	(Canada) Andrew Ranger	All
(United States) Conquest Racing	34	(Netherlands) Charles Zwolsman Jr. R	All
(United States) CTE Racing - HVM	4	(France) Nelson Philippe	All
(United States) CTE Racing - HVM	14	(United Kingdom) Dan Clarke R	All
(United States) Dale Coyne Racing	11	(Belgium) Jan Heylen R	All
(United States) Dale Coyne Racing	19	(Brazil) Cristiano da Matta	1–4
(United States) Dale Coyne Racing	19	(Mexico) Mario Domínguez	5–11
(United States) Dale Coyne Racing	19	(Uruguay) Juan Cáceres R	12
(United States) Dale Coyne Racing	19	(Germany) Andreas Wirth R	13–14
(United States) Forsythe Championship Racing	3	(Canada) Paul Tracy	1–13
(United States) Forsythe Championship Racing	3	(Mexico) David Martínez R	14
(United States) Forsythe Championship Racing	7	(Mexico) Mario Domínguez	1–4
(United States) Forsythe Championship Racing	7	(United States) A. J. Allmendinger	5–13
(United States) Forsythe Championship Racing	7	(United States) Buddy Rice R	14
(United States) Newman/Haas Racing	1	(France) Sébastien Bourdais	All
(United States) Newman/Haas Racing	2	(Brazil) Bruno Junqueira	All
(United States) PKV Racing	6	(Spain) Oriol Servià	All
(United States) PKV Racing	12	(United States) Jimmy Vasser	1
(United States) PKV Racing	20	(United Kingdom) Katherine Legge R	All
(United States) Rocketsports Racing	8	(Brazil) Antônio Pizzonia R	1
(United States) Rocketsports Racing	8	(Netherlands) Nicky Pastorelli R	2–6, 8–11
(United States) Rocketsports Racing	8	(Mexico) Mario Domínguez	12–14
(United States) Rocketsports Racing	18	(Estonia) Tõnis Kasemets R	5–8, 12
(United States) Rocketsports Racing	18	(Brazil) Antônio Pizzonia R	11, 13–14
(United States) RuSPORT	9	(United Kingdom) Justin Wilson	All
(United States) RuSPORT	10	(United States) A. J. Allmendinger	1–4
(United States) RuSPORT	10	(Brazil) Cristiano da Matta	5–9
(United States) RuSPORT	10	(Australia) Ryan Briscoe R	13–14
Team Australia	5	(Australia) Will Power R	All
Team Australia	15	(Canada) Alex Tagliani	All

Key
Symbol	Meaning
R	Eligible for Rookie of the Year

=== Team changes ===
Every team that fielded cars on a full-time basis in 2005 returned for the new season. In early 2005, Formula One and CCWS champion Emerson Fittipaldi began reorganizing his Fittipaldi Racing team after it was temporarily shut down at the end of the 2003 season. The team was rumored to debut in 2006, but seemingly ceased operations sometime in 2005. After a twelve-year absence from the series, EuroInternational announced their intentions to enter at least ten races in 2006 before fielding two full-time entries in 2007, when the series was set to introduce their new Panoz DP01 chassis. The announcement was met with uncertainty from fans, which was only heightened by its lack of confirmation by the series. Eventually, EuroInternational revealed they would not compete in the CCWS in 2006 because of how hard it was for them to acquire a Lola chassis, though they did race in the second-tier Atlantic Championship Series. Several teams from the Indy Racing League (IRL), including Panther Racing, were reportedly planning to enter the CCWS in 2006, but ultimately never did.

=== Driver changes ===
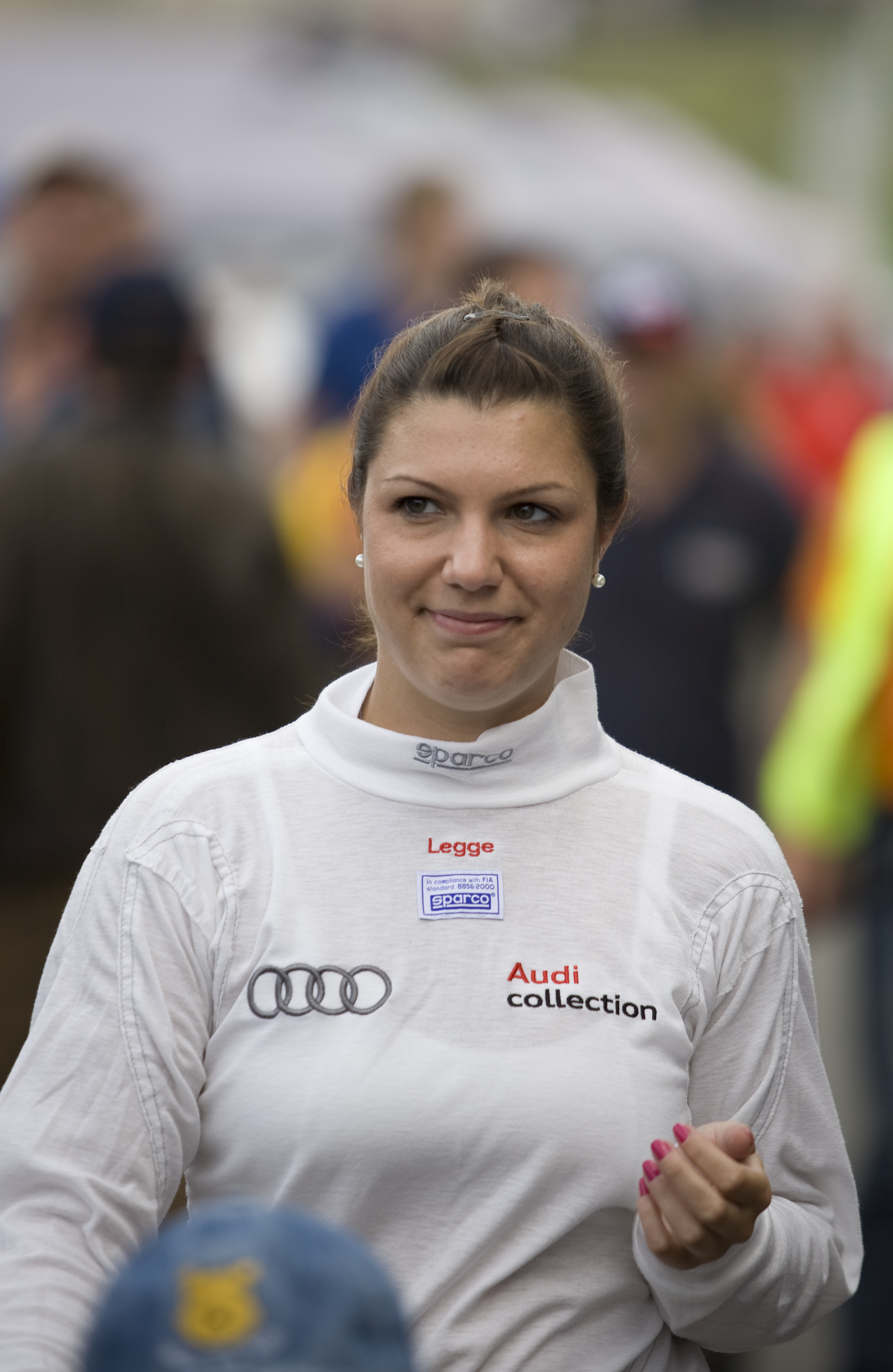
Katherine Legge (pictured in 2009) was the first female driver to race full-time in the Champ Car World Series.

After spending six months recovering from injuries sustained in a crash during the 2005 Indianapolis 500, Bruno Junqueira completed over 200 laps during a three-day testing session at Sebring International Raceway in December 2005 and announced his return to Newman/Haas Racing for 2006. Junqueira's teammate, two-time and defending series champion Sébastien Bourdais, signed a one-year contract extension with Newman/Haas Racing which included an exit clause if an opportunity arose to compete in Formula One. Bourdais admitted that he initially held off on extending his contract because he had attempted to secure a seat with BMW Sauber, though the costs of terminating Jacques Villeneuve's contract were too expensive for the team.

Newman/Haas Racing failed to gain enough funding to field a third entry for Oriol Servià, who substituted for Junqueira for the last eleven races of the 2005 season and finished second in the Drivers' Championship standings. Meanwhile, Jimmy Vasser opted to solely compete in the season-opening Toyota Grand Prix of Long Beach before retiring from American open-wheel car racing, forcing PKV Racing to find a replacement driver. The team tested with Ryan Briscoe, Franck Montagny, Giorgio Pantano, and Ryan Dalziel, but ultimately chose Servià as he had more experience in the series. Servià was teamed with Katherine Legge, a three-time winner in the Atlantic Championship who became the first female driver to race full-time in the series.

Legge and Servià's hirings at PKV Racing left Cristiano da Matta without a ride for 2006, as he had already fell out with the team's management following a string of poor results towards the latter half of the 2005 season. Da Matta later joined Dale Coyne Racing, though he was essentially forced to drive for the team without a salary. Reigning Eurocup Mégane Trophy champion Jan Heylen initially sought an opportunity to race for Conquest Racing, but the team's seats were occupied by 2005 Atlantic Championship Series champion Charles Zwolsman Jr. and Andrew Ranger, the latter of whom intended only to compete at Long Beach and the three races in Canada before obtaining enough sponsorship to complete the entire season in May. After partaking in a test session with Dale Coyne Racing along with Nicky Pastorelli at California Speedway, Heylen was selected as da Matta's teammate for 2006. Dale Coyne Racing announced Heylen's hiring only hours prior to the first practice session for the Toyota Grand Prix of Long Beach.

As his contract with Forsythe Championship Racing was set to expire at the end of the 2005 season, series veteran Paul Tracy expressed interest in competing in NASCAR. In August 2005, he tested an ARCA car owned by Richard Childress at Michigan International Speedway, and later declared his intentions to drive part-time in the second-tier Busch Series in 2006 before fully switching to NASCAR in 2007. Despite doubts that Tracy would return to the Champ Car World Series in 2006, he opted to continue racing in the series that year alongside teammate Mario Domínguez. By April 2006, Tracy spoke to the media about talks for an extension of his current contract with Forsythe Racing, and a new five-year deal with the team was announced the next month.

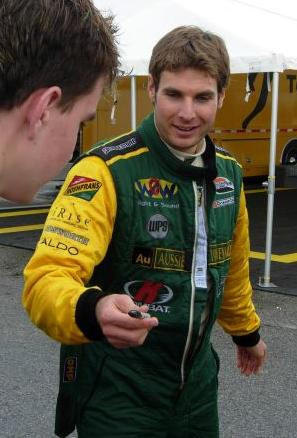
Will Power (pictured in 2007) joined Team Australia as a rookie.

Ahead of the previous season's Lexmark Indy 300, Will Power signed a three-year contract with Team Australia and subsequently replaced the outgoing Marcus Marshall, as he was let go by the team near the end of the 2005 season because of their straining relationship with him, while Alex Tagliani remained with the team. Rumors circulated that Team Australia planned on running a third car for Australian driver Ryan Briscoe; however, Briscoe only wound up competing with the team in the final three races of the 2005–06 A1 Grand Prix season.

After 2005 Rookie of the Year Timo Glock left the CCWS to race in the GP2 Series, DHL pulled their sponsorship of Rocketsports Racing and the team was left scrambling to find another driver. They planned to hire Franck Montagny before being approached with a sponsorship effort headed by four Brazilian businessmen, which called for Brazilian drivers Antônio Pizzonia and Enrique Bernoldi to race under the name of Team Brazil. The two drivers completed a testing session at Houston Motorsports Ranch in March, but a deal was not reached in time for the start of the season, forcing Rocketsports Racing to field a single entry for Pizzonia at Long Beach. Negotiations continued throughout the season, although nothing ever materialized.

Comedian and actor Cedric the Entertainer joined the CCWS as a co-owner of HVM Racing, which had been renamed to CTE Racing - HVM to commemorate his partnership with the team. Although Ronnie Bremer had signed a contract to remain with the team for 2006, a lack of sponsorship led to the deal being voided less than two weeks before the start of the season. CTE Racing - HVM's two seats were taken by Nelson Philippe, who spent the last two seasons racing for Conquest Racing, and rookie Dan Clarke, who finished fifth in the 2005 British Formula 3 International Series.

==== Mid-season changes ====
- On April 28, Nicky Pastorelli was announced as Rocketsports Racing's "full-time" driver, after two testing appearances with the team during the month. Pastorelli had won the Euro Formula 3000 series in 2004, was a Formula One test driver for Jordan Grand Prix in 2005, and was scheduled to remain as such with the renamed Midland F1 Racing, but that opportunity fell through in December when one of Pastorelli's investors backed out of the deal.
- On May 25, Rocketsports Racing announced it would field a second car for rookie Tõnis Kasemets in six unspecified races, beginning with the fifth round of the season at Portland. After four races in a row, Kasemets would only race again at Road America in September, competing in five events instead. Kasemets became the first Estonian to drive in Champ Car, after finishing second in the Atlantic Championship with three wins against the also promoted Charles Zwolsman Jr. and Katherine Legge.
- On June 9, following the race at the Milwaukee Mile, the RuSPORT team announced that they were replacing A. J. Allmendinger with Cristiano da Matta, who switched after just four races with Dale Coyne Racing. The change came as a total surprise, as Allmendinger had been the cornerstone of the team since its founding in 2002. The move was caused by profound differences between both parties over RuSPORT and Allmendinger's joint potential to overcome Bourdais' early domination.
- On June 12 Forsythe Racing announced they were parting company with Mario Domínguez over "changes in the engineering structure of the team (that) no longer suit both parties". Domínguez had clashed twice with his teammate Paul Tracy and Bruno Junqueira in the first four races. On June 14, the open seat was filled, as A. J. Allmendinger was announced as Domínguez's replacement, just five days after being fired himself.
- On June 16, Mario Domínguez took over as the driver of the No. 19 car for Dale Coyne Racing, vacated a week before by Cristiano da Matta. Domínguez claimed to have been fired from Forsythe in order to keep A. J. Allmendinger in the series, as the only American driver in the field.
- Since July, the line-up at Rocketsports Racing underwent a number of changes:
  - On July 5, it was announced that the No. 8 car driven by Nicky Pastorelli would not compete at the Toronto event, after one of Pastorelli's sponsors had defaulted. The sponsorship problem was solved in time for the next round in Edmonton, as announced on July 18.
  - On August 23, Antônio Pizzonia was announced to return in a one-race deal at Montréal, this time on the No. 18 car. After Tõnis Kasemets raced at Road America, Pizzonia finished the season in the car, being announced for the Surfers Paradise race, and then for the Mexico City finale.
  - On September 18, Mario Domínguez was signed to complete the season in the No. 8 car for the final three races, switching from Dale Coyne Racing. Nicky Pastorelli was out again due to his continuing financial issues, and while the team hoped to have him in the No. 18 for the final two races, it went with Pizzonia instead.
- On August 3, Cristiano da Matta sustained serious head injuries in a testing accident at Road America, after colliding with a deer that crossed the track between turns 5 and 6. Da Matta was transferred out of intensive care unit later that month and left the hospital on September 23, but the crash sidelined him for the rest of the season, and it eventually ended his open-wheel racing career. In response to the crash, RuSPORT withdrew the No. 10 car for the Denver event, and no replacement driver was announced for Montréal or Road America, despite rumours of Dario Franchitti finishing the season in the car.
- After Mario Domínguez's departure, Dale Coyne Racing filled the No. 19 on a race-by-race basis. On September 19, it announced rookie Juan Cáceres for the race at Road America. Cáceres, who had already tested with the team earlier that month, was fifth in points in Euroseries 3000 at the time. On October 12, Andreas Wirth was announced for Surfers Paradise on the heels of his third place finish in Champ Car Atlantic, and he remained in the No. 19 for the season finale with no formal announcement.
- On October 9, RuSPORT announced Ryan Briscoe would take over the No. 10 for the final two races of the season. Briscoe was a former Formula 3 Euro Series champion and Formula One test driver for Toyota, who looked all year for opportunities in Champ Car after a difficult 2005 season in the IndyCar Series with Chip Ganassi Racing.
- On October 24, following the race in Surfers Paradise, A. J. Allmendinger announced that he would drive for Team Red Bull in the NASCAR Sprint Cup Series in 2007. On October 27, Forsythe Racing team announced that Allmendinger would be replaced immediately by 2004 Indianapolis 500 winner Buddy Rice for the final race of the season in Mexico City. Rice was looking for a permantent switch to Champ Car after losing his IndyCar ride with Rahal Letterman Racing, but he would not compete in any other race in the series.
- On October 31, Forsythe Racing announced a deal to run a third car in Mexico City for rookie David Martínez, who finished fifth in Champ Car Atlantic. However, on November 6, it was announced that Paul Tracy would miss the Mexico race after breaking his right scapula in an alcohol-fueled accident that was alternately reported as happening on either an ATV or a golf cart. As a result, David Martínez ended up making his Champ Car debut driving Tracy's No. 3 car, instead of the No. 33 he was originally slated to drive.

== Schedule ==
The schedule was officially announced by Champ Car on August 13, 2005.

Round	Date	Race	Track	Location	TV
1	April 9	Toyota Grand Prix of Long Beach	S Streets of Long Beach	(United States) Long Beach, California	NBC
2	May 13	Grand Prix of Houston	S Reliant Park	(United States) Houston, Texas	SPEED
3	May 21	Tecate Grand Prix of Monterrey	R Fundidora Park	(Mexico) Monterrey, Nuevo León	SPEED
4	June 4	Time Warner Cable Road Runner 225	O Milwaukee Mile	(United States) West Allis, Wisconsin	SPEED
5	June 18	Grand Prix of Portland	R Portland International Raceway	(United States) Portland, Oregon	CBS
6	June 25	Champ Car Grand Prix of Cleveland	S Cleveland Burke Lakefront Airport	(United States) Cleveland, Ohio	CBS
7	July 9	Molson Grand Prix of Toronto	S Exhibition Place	(Canada) Toronto, Ontario	CBS
8	July 23	West Edmonton Mall Grand Prix	R Rexall Speedway	(Canada) Edmonton, Alberta	CBS
9	July 30	Canary Foundation Grand Prix of San José	S Streets of San Jose	(United States) San Jose, California	NBC
10	August 13	Grand Prix of Denver	S Denver Civic Center	(United States) Denver, Colorado	SPEED
11	August 27	Champ Car Grand Prix de Montréal	R Circuit Gilles Villeneuve	(Canada) Montreal, Quebec	NBC
12	September 24	Grand Prix of Road America	R Road America	(United States) Elkhart Lake, Wisconsin	SPEED
13	October 22	Lexmark Indy 300	S Surfers Paradise Street Circuit	(Australia) Surfers Paradise, Queensland	SPEED
14	November 12	Gran Premio Telmex	R Autódromo Hermanos Rodríguez	Mexico City	SPEED

Key
Symbol	Track type
O	Oval track
R	Road course
S	Street circuit

=== Schedule changes ===
Fourteen races were included on the 2006 schedule, up from 13 in 2005, marking the first time since 1999 that the number of races on the series' schedule increased. The Grand Prix of Houston, which had not been held since 2001, returned to the series' schedule on a new 1.7 mi (2.7 km) street circuit surrounding the Astrodome and Reliant Stadium, as opposed to the previous street circuit in downtown Houston. The race was notably scheduled on the same day as pole qualifications for the Indianapolis 500; no CCWS teams ended up entering the Indianapolis 500 that year. After being excluded from the schedule in 2005, the Grand Prix of Road America was brought back in 2006, replacing the race at Las Vegas Motor Speedway and leaving the Time Warner Cable Road Runner 225 at the Milwaukee Mile as the lone oval track race on the calendar. However, series president Steve Johnson emphasized his commitment to continue hosting oval races for the series. The Gran Premio Telmex was pushed back from November 5 to November 12 at the request of the promoter in order to avoid conflict with All Souls' Day, the traditional national holiday of remembrance in Mexico.

In March 2005, Champ Car co-owner Kevin Kalkhoven announced the series' debut in China, specifically at the Goldenport Park Circuit in Beijing, for the 2006 season, with Beijing State-owned Assets Management Company Chairman Li Aiqing taking the role of the event's promoter. The race was to be held either in May or September 2006, but was excluded from the provisional calendar because the event had not been finalized and eventually cancelled. Among the races included in the provisional calendar was the inaugural Ansan Champ Car Grand Prix at the streets of Ansan, South Korea, which was deferred from the 2005 season because of a lack of preparation for the event. The race was again called off in July 2006 because of troubles with the circuit's construction, and it was finally abandoned after two consecutive cancellations.

The CCWS almost lost their most prestigious event, the Grand Prix of Long Beach, to the IRL IndyCar Series once their contract with the race's owners, Dover Motorsports, came to an end in 2005. IRL president Tony George even assured the series' teams that they would be racing at Long Beach in 2006, and the Rolex Sports Car Series would host a support race. However, Champ Car co-owners Kalkhoven and Gerald Forsythe bought out the event in June 2005, guaranteeing that it would remain on their series' calendar for 2006 and beyond. George's failure to secure the race reportedly angered sponsors of the IRL.

== Season report ==
=== Pre-season ===
Preparations for the 2006 season began with a three-day test at Sebring International Raceway in December 2005. Bruno Junqueira returned to driving for the first time since his crash in the Indianapolis 500 in May and lapped the fastest time in two of the three days. The second day was celebrated as Katherine Legge's debut in an American open-wheel car. An open test was conducted on the 1.459 mi (2.348 km) road course configuration of California Speedway on March 29–30. Sébastien Bourdais and Justin Wilson set the fastest times of both days.

=== Opening rounds ===
Bourdais earned the pole position for the season-opening Toyota Grand Prix of Long Beach by recording the fastest laps of the two qualifying sessions in the weekend. His lap on Saturday set a new track record at Long Beach Street Circuit. Paul Tracy started sixth, his worst starting position on a street circuit since the 2003 Centrix Financial Grand Prix of Denver, after crashing in both qualifying sessions of the weekend. On the first lap, Tracy was hit from behind by Mario Domínguez in turn one, setting off a pileup that also involved Bruno Junqueira, A. J. Allmendinger, and Oriol Servià.

== Results and standings ==
=== Races ===
Round	Race	Pole position	Fastest lap	Race winner		Report
Round	Race	Pole position	Fastest lap	Driver	Team	Report
1	(United States) Long Beach	(France) Sébastien Bourdais	(France) Sébastien Bourdais	(France) Sébastien Bourdais	Newman/Haas Racing	Report
2	(United States) Houston	(Mexico) Mario Domínguez	(France) Sébastien Bourdais	(France) Sébastien Bourdais	Newman/Haas Racing	Report
3	(Mexico) Monterrey	(France) Sébastien Bourdais	(France) Sébastien Bourdais	(France) Sébastien Bourdais	Newman/Haas Racing	Report
4	(United States) Milwaukee	(France) Sébastien Bourdais	(France) Sébastien Bourdais	(France) Sébastien Bourdais	Newman/Haas Racing	Report
5	(United States) Portland	(Brazil) Bruno Junqueira	(Australia) Will Power	(United States) A. J. Allmendinger	Forsythe Racing	Report
6	(United States) Cleveland	(United States) A. J. Allmendinger	(France) Nelson Philippe	(United States) A. J. Allmendinger	Forsythe Racing	Report
7	(Canada) Toronto	(United Kingdom) Justin Wilson	(Canada) Alex Tagliani	(United States) A. J. Allmendinger	Forsythe Racing	Report
8	(Canada) Edmonton	(France) Sébastien Bourdais	(United Kingdom) Justin Wilson	(United Kingdom) Justin Wilson	RuSPORT	Report
9	(United States) San José	(France) Sébastien Bourdais	(France) Sébastien Bourdais	(France) Sébastien Bourdais	Newman/Haas Racing	Report
10	(United States) Denver	(France) Sébastien Bourdais	(France) Sébastien Bourdais	(United States) A. J. Allmendinger	Forsythe Racing	Report
11	(Canada) Montréal	(France) Sébastien Bourdais	(France) Sébastien Bourdais	(France) Sébastien Bourdais	Newman/Haas Racing	Report
12	(United States) Road America	(United Kingdom) Dan Clarke	(France) Sébastien Bourdais	(United States) A. J. Allmendinger	Forsythe Racing	Report
13	(Australia) Surfers Paradise	(Australia) Will Power	(Canada) Paul Tracy	(France) Nelson Philippe	CTE Racing - HVM	Report
14	Mexico City	(United Kingdom) Justin Wilson	(France) Sébastien Bourdais	(France) Sébastien Bourdais	Newman/Haas Racing	Report

=== Drivers' Championship standings ===
Pos.	Driver	LBH (United States)	HOU (United States)	FUN (Mexico)	MIL (United States)	POR (United States)	CLE (United States)	TOR (Canada)	EDM (Canada)	SJO (United States)	DEN (United States)	CGV (Canada)	ROA (United States)	SUR (Australia)	MXC (Mexico)	Points
1	(France) Sébastien Bourdais	**1***	1	**1***	**1***	3	18	3	**2***	**1***	**7**	**1***	3*	8	1	387
2	(United Kingdom) Justin Wilson	2	5	2	2	2	13	**4**	1	3	8	14	5	Wth ^{5}	**2***	298
3	(United States) A. J. Allmendinger	16	8	3	4	1*	**1***	1*	3	7	1*	17	1	16		285
4	(France) Nelson Philippe	13	4	17	3	8	10	13	14	4	5	3	14	1*	7	231
5	(Brazil) Bruno Junqueira	15	10	10	15	**4**	2	8	15	17	2	12	2	6	4	219
6	(Australia) Will Power RY	9	7	11	11	18	9	7	6	6	4	5	13	**12**	3	213
7	(Canada) Paul Tracy	17	2	4	16	7	16	2	5	15 ^{3}	6 ^{4}	2	10	4		209
8	(Canada) Alex Tagliani	3	11	5	Wth ^{1}	11	4	6	12	14	16	7	11	3	5	205
9	(Mexico) Mario Domínguez	4	**3***	6	14 ^{2}	14	6	11	8	5	13	10	12	2	17	202
10	(Canada) Andrew Ranger	6	6	7	7	9	11	10	7	13	14	15	8	5	8	200
11	(Spain) Oriol Servià	18	12	8	5	10	3	12	4	8	15	16	4	13	6	197
12	(United Kingdom) Dan Clarke R	11	16	13	8	6	7	17	9	16	3	4	**6**	17	18	175
13	(Netherlands) Charles Zwolsman Jr. R	12	15	12	9	12	15	9	10	9	10	8	7	7	11	162
14	(Belgium) Jan Heylen R	7	13	16	12	15	5	16	16	11	11	9	9	14	13	140
15	(Brazil) Cristiano da Matta	5	9	9	13	5	14	5	18	2						134
16	(United Kingdom) Katherine Legge R	8	14	14	6	13	8	14	13	12	9	13	16	15	16	133
17	(Netherlands) Nicky Pastorelli R		17	15	10	17	17		17	10	12	6				73
18	(Brazil) Antônio Pizzonia R	10										11		10	12	43
19	(Estonia) Tõnis Kasemets R					16	12	15	11				17			34
20	(Germany) Andreas Wirth R													9	15	19
21	(Australia) Ryan Briscoe R													11	14	17
22	(Mexico) David Martínez R														9	13
23	(United States) Buddy Rice R														10	11
24	(United States) Jimmy Vasser	14														7
25	(Uruguay) Juan Cáceres R												15			6
Pos.	Driver	LBH (United States)	HOU (United States)	FUN (Mexico)	MIL (United States)	POR (United States)	CLE (United States)	TOR (Canada)	EDM (Canada)	SJO (United States)	DEN (United States)	CGV (Canada)	ROA (United States)	SUR (Australia)	MXC (Mexico)	Points

Color	Result
Gold	Winner
Silver	2nd place
Bronze	3rd place
Green	4th & 5th place
Light Blue	6th-10th place
Dark Blue	Finished (Outside Top 10)
Purple	Did not finish
Red	Did not qualify (DNQ)
Brown	Withdrawn (Wth)
Black	Disqualified (DSQ)
White	Did not start (DNS)
Blank	Did not participate (DNP)
Blank	Not competing

**In-line notation**
**Bold**	Pole position
Italics	Ran fastest race lap
*	Led most race laps
RY	Rookie of the Year
R	Rookie

Notes:

- ^{1} Alex Tagliani withdrew from the race in Milwaukee after his car was heavily damaged in a crash during practice
- ^{2} Mario Domínguez was docked 7 points for causing an avoidable crash in Milwaukee
- ^{3} Paul Tracy was docked 7 points for causing an avoidable crash in San Jose
- ^{4} Paul Tracy was once again docked 3 points for causing an avoidable crash in Denver
- ^{5} Justin Wilson withdrew from the race in Surfers Paradise after breaking his wrist in a crash during practice

=== Nations' Cup standings ===
- Top result per race counts towards the Nations' Cup

Pos.	Country	LBH (United States)	HOU (United States)	FUN (Mexico)	MIL (United States)	POR (United States)	CLE (United States)	TOR (Canada)	EDM (Canada)	SJO (United States)	DEN (United States)	CGV (Canada)	ROA (United States)	SUR (Australia)	MXC (Mexico)	Points
1	France	1	1	1	1	3	10	3	2	1	5	1	3	1	1	397
2	United Kingdom	2	5	2	2	2	7	4	1	3	3	4	5	15	2	331
3	United States	14	8	3	4	1	1	1	3	7	1	17	1	16	10	292
3	Canada	3	2	4	7	7	4	2	5	13	6	2	8	3	5	292
5	Brazil	5	9	9	13	4	2	5	15	2	2	11	2	6	4	266
6	Mexico	4	3	6	14^{1}	14	6	11	8	5	13	10	12	2	9	209
7	Australia	9	7	11	11	18	9	7	6	6	4	5	13	11	3	209
8	Spain	18	12	8	5	10	3	12	4	8	15	16	4	13	6	192
9	Netherlands	12	15	12	9	12	15	9	10	9	10	6	7	7	11	163
10	Belgium	7	13	16	12	15	5	16	16	11	11	9	9	14	13	137
11	Estonia					16	12	15	11				17			34
12	Germany													9	15	19
12	Uruguay												15			6
Pos.	Country	LBH (United States)	HOU (United States)	FUN (Mexico)	MIL (United States)	POR (United States)	CLE (United States)	TOR (Canada)	EDM (Canada)	SJO (United States)	DEN (United States)	CGV (Canada)	ROA (United States)	SUR (Australia)	MXC (Mexico)	Points

Notes

^{1} Mexico was penalized 7 points as a result of a penalty applied to Mario Domínguez in Milwaukee

== Bibliography ==
- Higham, Peter (1995). "IndyCar Championship". The Guinness Guide to International Motor Racing. London, England: Motorbooks International. ISBN 978-0-7603-0152-4 – via Internet Archive.

== See also ==
- 2006 Champ Car Atlantic season
- 2006 Indianapolis 500
- 2006 IndyCar Series
- 2006 Indy Pro Series season
