= 2006 Canary Foundation Grand Prix of San Jose =

(United States) 2006 San Jose
Race details
- Race 9 of 14 in the 2006 Champ Car season
- San Jose Street Circuit Layout
- Date: July 30, 2006
- Official name: Canary Foundation Grand Prix of San Jose
- Location: Streets of San Jose, California, United States
- Course: Temporary street circuit 1.443 mi / 2.322 km
- Distance: 97 laps 139.971 mi / 225.234 km
- Weather: Sunny with temperatures reaching a high of 82.4 °F (28.0 °C); wind speeds reaching up to 14 miles per hour (23 km/h)

Pole position
- Driver: (France) Sébastien Bourdais (Newman/Haas Racing)
- Time: 48.989

Fastest lap
- Driver: (France) Sébastien Bourdais (Newman/Haas Racing)
- Time: 49.678 (on lap 94 of 97)

Podium
- First: (France) Sébastien Bourdais (Newman/Haas Racing)
- Second: (Brazil) Cristiano da Matta (RuSPORT)
- Third: (United Kingdom) Justin Wilson (RuSPORT)

The 2006 Canary Foundation Grand Prix of San Jose was the ninth round of the 2006 Bridgestone Presents the Champ Car World Series Powered by Ford season, held on July 30, 2006 on the streets of San Jose, California. Sébastien Bourdais dominated the weekend, taking the pole, fastest lap and race win. Finishing second was 2002 CART champion Cristiano da Matta in what turned out to be his final Champ Car event. On August 3 da Matta was severely injured while testing at Road America in Elkhart Lake, Wisconsin when he collided with a deer on the track. While da Matta recovered to return to racing in 2008, competing in the Rolex Sports Car Series, he has not competed in open wheel racing since. The race is also notable for a shoving match between Canadians Paul Tracy and Alex Tagliani in the pits after Tracy crashed into Tagliani while trying to return to the race course from an escape road, ending both their races.

== Qualifying results ==
Pos	Nat	Name	Team	Qual 1	Qual 2	Best
1	(France)	Sébastien Bourdais	Newman/Haas Racing	50.160	48.989	48.989
2	(Canada)	Paul Tracy	Forsythe Racing	50.156	49.810	49.810
3	(United States)	A. J. Allmendinger	Forsythe Racing	50.246	49.264	49.264
4	(Brazil)	Cristiano da Matta	RuSPORT	50.734	49.659	49.659
5	(Spain)	Oriol Servià	PKV Racing	50.388	49.813	49.813
6	(Australia)	Will Power	Team Australia	—	49.867	49.867
7	(Brazil)	Bruno Junqueira	Newman/Haas Racing	50.587	49.887	49.887
8	(Canada)	Andrew Ranger	Mi-Jack Conquest Racing	50.925	49.962	49.962
9	(United Kingdom)	Dan Clarke	CTE Racing-HVM	50.278	50.161	50.161
10	(Mexico)	Mario Domínguez	Dale Coyne Racing	50.861	50.215	50.215
11	(France)	Nelson Philippe	CTE Racing-HVM	50.440	50.312	50.312
12	(United Kingdom)	Justin Wilson	RuSPORT	50.504	50.341	50.341
13	(Canada)	Alex Tagliani	Team Australia	50.373	—	50.373
14	(Netherlands)	Charles Zwolsman Jr.	Mi-Jack Conquest Racing	51.004	50.435	50.435
15	(United Kingdom)	Katherine Legge	PKV Racing	51.329	50.473	50.473
16	(Belgium)	Jan Heylen	Dale Coyne Racing	51.591	50.838	50.838
17	(Netherlands)	Nicky Pastorelli	Rocketsports Racing	52.344	51.628	51.628

== Race ==
Pos	No	Driver	Team	Laps	Time/Retired	Grid	Points
1	1	(France) Sébastien Bourdais	Newman/Haas Racing	97	1:38:00.168	1	34
2	10	(Brazil) Cristiano da Matta	RuSPORT	97	+6.686 secs	4	27
3	9	(United Kingdom) Justin Wilson	RuSPORT	97	+8.100 secs	12	26
4	4	(France) Nelson Philippe	CTE Racing-HVM	97	+11.059 secs	11	23
5	19	(Mexico) Mario Domínguez	Dale Coyne Racing	97	+12.147 secs	10	21
6	5	(Australia) Will Power	Team Australia	97	+12.957 secs	6	19
7	7	(United States) A. J. Allmendinger	Forsythe Racing	97	+13.288 secs	3	17
8	6	(Spain) Oriol Servià	PKV Racing	97	+15.920 secs	5	16
9	34	(Netherlands) Charles Zwolsman Jr.	Mi-Jack Conquest Racing	97	+16.458 secs	14	14
10	8	(Netherlands) Nicky Pastorelli	Rocketsports Racing	97	+21.580 secs	17	11
11	11	(Belgium) Jan Heylen	Dale Coyne Racing	97	+25.360 secs	16	10
12	20	(United Kingdom) Katherine Legge	PKV Racing	90	+ 7 Laps	15	9
13	27	(Canada) Andrew Ranger	Mi-Jack Conquest Racing	80	Contact	8	8
14	15	(Canada) Alex Tagliani	Team Australia	52	Contact	13	7
15	3	(Canada) Paul Tracy	Forsythe Racing	51	Contact	2	0^{*}
16	14	(United Kingdom) Dan Clarke	CTE Racing-HVM	49	Gearbox	9	5
17	2	(Brazil) Bruno Junqueira	Newman/Haas Racing	2	Contact	7	4

^{*} Paul Tracy was penalized 7 points and fined an undisclosed amount for causing avoidable contact and bringing the sport into disrepute for his part in the accident and subsequent shoving match with Alex Tagliani. He was also placed on probation for the following 3 races (Denver, Montreal and Road America). Tagliani was also fined an undisclosed amount.

== Caution flags ==
Laps	Cause
1	Yellow start
3-5	Junqueira (2) & Servià (6) crash
36-40	Legge (20) crash
53-59	Tracy (3) & Tagliani (15) crash
81-85	Ranger (27) crash

== Notes ==
Laps	Leader
1-3^{*}	Paul Tracy
4-54	Sébastien Bourdais
55-59	Charles Zwolsman Jr.
60-79	Oriol Servià
80-97	Sébastien Bourdais

^{*} Paul Tracy was not credited with leading laps 1-3 as part of his penalty.

Driver	Laps led
Sébastien Bourdais	69
Oriol Servià	20
Charles Zwolsman Jr.	5

- New Track Record Sébastien Bourdais 48.989 (Qualification Session #2)
- New Race Lap Record Sébastien Bourdais 49.678
- New Race Record Sébastien Bourdais 1:38:00.168
- Average Speed 85.694 mph

== Championship standings after the race ==
Drivers' Championship standings

	Pos	Driver	Points
	1	(France) Sébastien Bourdais	255
	2	(United Kingdom) Justin Wilson	224
	3	(United States) A. J. Allmendinger	210
2	4	(Mexico) Mario Domínguez	141
	5	(Canada) Andrew Ranger	135

- Note: Only the top five positions are included.

Previous race: 2006 West Edmonton Mall Grand Prix of Edmonton	Champ Car World Series; 2006 season	Next race: 2006 Grand Prix of Denver
Previous race: 2005 Taylor Woodrow Grand Prix of San Jose	2006 Canary Foundation Grand Prix of San Jose	Next race: 2007 San Jose Grand Prix at Redback Raceway
