= 2006 Gran Premio Telmex =

14th race of the 2006 Champ Car season

(Mexico) 2006 Gran Premio Telmex
Race details
- Race 14 of 14 in the 2006 Champ Car season
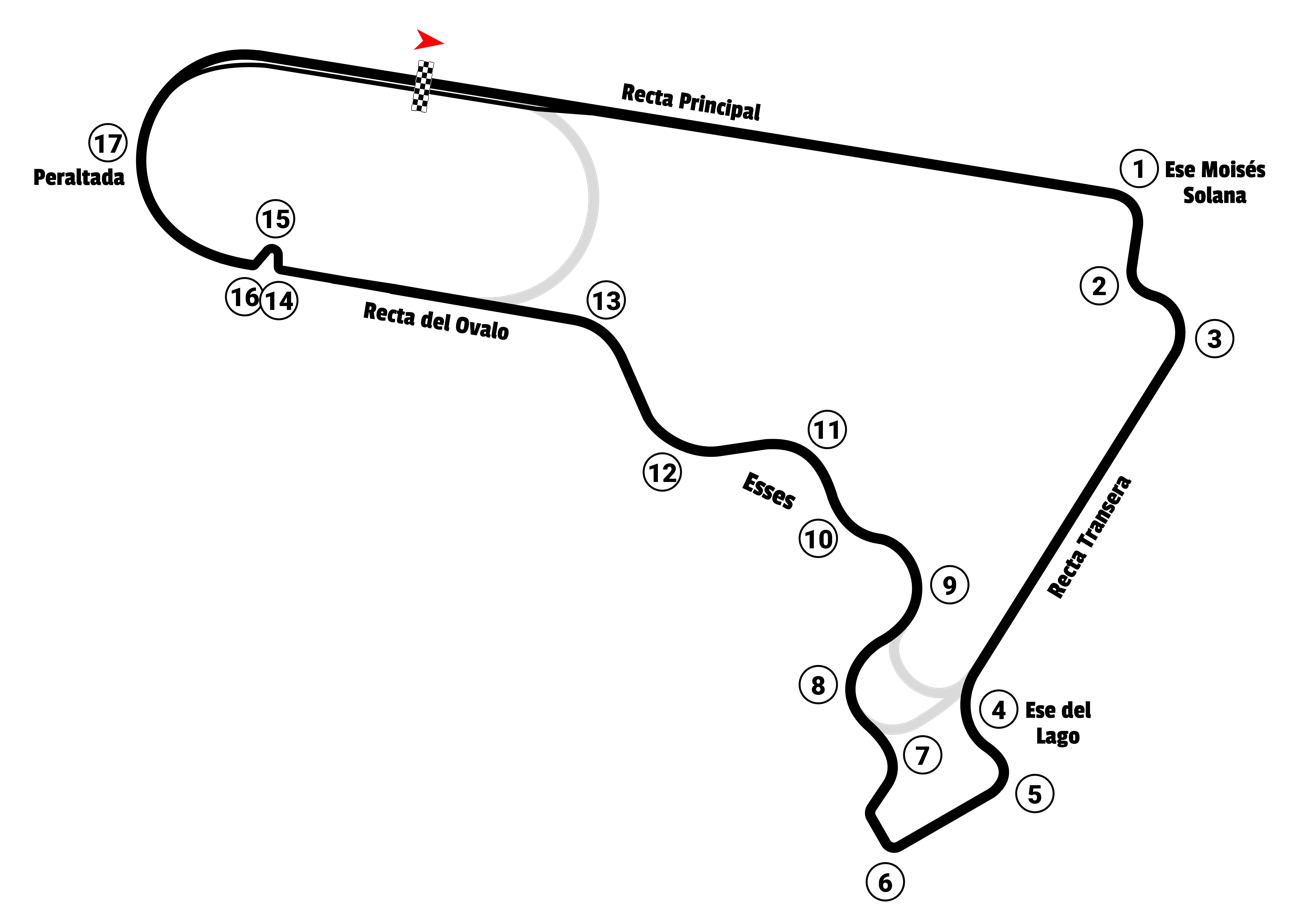
- Autódromo Hermanos Rodríguez Track Layout
- Date: November 12, 2006
- Official name: Gran Premio Telmex presented by Banamex
- Location: Autódromo Hermanos Rodríguez; Mexico City, Mexico
- Course: Permanent Road Course; 2.774 mi / 4.464 km
- Distance: 66 laps 183.084 mi / 294.624 km
- Weather: Sunny

Pole position
- Driver: (United Kingdom) Justin Wilson (RuSPORT)
- Time: 1:24.801

Fastest lap
- Driver: (France) Sébastien Bourdais (Newman/Haas Racing)
- Time: 1:27.644 (on lap 6 of 66)

Podium
- First: (France) Sébastien Bourdais (Newman/Haas Racing)
- Second: (United Kingdom) Justin Wilson (RuSPORT)
- Third: Will Power (Team Australia)

The 2006 Gran Premio Telmex was the fourteenth and final round of the 2006 Bridgestone Presents the Champ Car World Series Powered by Ford season, held on November 12, 2006, on the Autódromo Hermanos Rodríguez in Mexico City, Mexico.

This event marked the final race for the Lola B02/00 chassis, as the series transitioned to the Panoz DP01 for 2007. 2004 Indianapolis 500 champion Buddy Rice made his Champ Car debut with Forsythe Racing following A. J. Allmendinger's move to NASCAR.

The pole was won by Justin Wilson, while the race was won by season champion Sébastien Bourdais, his seventh victory of the year.

== Qualifying results ==
Pos	No.	Name	Team	Qual 1	Qual 2	Best
1	9	(United Kingdom) Justin Wilson	RuSPORT	1:25.560	1:24.801	1:24.801
2	1	(France) Sébastien Bourdais	Newman/Haas Racing	1:25.449	1:24.986	1:24.986
3	2	(Brazil) Bruno Junqueira	Newman/Haas Racing	1:26.118	1:25.491	1:25.491
4	5	(Australia) Will Power	Team Australia	1:25.624	1:25.736	1:25.624
5	10	(Australia) Ryan Briscoe	RuSPORT	1:26.494	1:25.643	1:25.643
6	14	(United Kingdom) Dan Clarke	CTE Racing - HVM	1:27.516	1:25.942	1:25.942
7	6	(Spain) Oriol Servià	PKV Racing	1:26.527	1:26.068	1:26.068
8	15	(Canada) Alex Tagliani	Team Australia	1:27.436	1:26.087	1:26.087
9	3	(Mexico) David Martínez	Forsythe Racing	1:26.819	1:26.146	1:26.146
10	4	(France) Nelson Philippe	CTE Racing - HVM	1:26.708	1:26.278	1:26.278
11	8	(Mexico) Mario Domínguez	Rocketsports Racing	1:27.151	1:26.450	1:26.450
12	34	(Netherlands) Charles Zwolsman Jr.	Mi-Jack Conquest Racing	1:27.268	1:26.480	1:26.480
13	20	(United Kingdom) Katherine Legge	PKV Racing	1:27.720	1:26.607	1:26.607
14	7	(United States) Buddy Rice	Forsythe Racing	1:27.336	1:26.736	1:26.736
15	18	(Brazil) Antônio Pizzonia	Rocketsports Racing	1:27.566	1:26.948	1:26.948
16	27	(Canada) Andrew Ranger	Mi-Jack Conquest Racing	1:27.089	1:27.089	1:27.089
17	11	(Belgium) Jan Heylen	Dale Coyne Racing	1:27.214	1:28.091	1:27.214
18	19	(Germany) Andreas Wirth	Dale Coyne Racing	1:29.148	1:27.842	1:27.842
References:,

== Race ==
Pos	No	Driver	Team	Laps	Time/Retired	Grid	Points
1	1	(France) Sébastien Bourdais	Newman/Haas Racing	66	1:51:31.146	2	34
2	9	(United Kingdom) Justin Wilson	RuSPORT	66	+3.528 secs	1	29
3	5	(Australia) Will Power	Team Australia	66	+46.536 secs	4	26
4	2	(Brazil) Bruno Junqueira	Newman/Haas Racing	66	+1:04.023	3	23
5	15	(Canada) Alex Tagliani	Team Australia	66	+1:18.033	8	22
6	6	(Spain) Oriol Servià	PKV Racing	66	+1:28.745	7	19
7	4	(France) Nelson Philippe	CTE Racing - HVM	66	+1:29.997	10	17
8	27	(Canada) Andrew Ranger	Mi-Jack Conquest Racing	65	+ 1 Lap	16	16
9	3	(Mexico) David Martínez	Forsythe Racing	65	+ 1 Lap	9	13
10	7	(United States) Buddy Rice	Forsythe Racing	65	+ 1 Lap	14	11
11	34	(Netherlands) Charles Zwolsman Jr.	Mi-Jack Conquest Racing	65	+ 1 Lap	12	10
12	18	(Brazil) Antônio Pizzonia	Rocketsports Racing	65	+ 1 Lap	15	9
13	11	(Belgium) Jan Heylen	Dale Coyne Racing	65	+ 1 Lap	17	8
14	10	(Australia) Ryan Briscoe	RuSPORT	64	+ 2 Laps	5	7
15	19	(Germany) Andreas Wirth	Dale Coyne Racing	64	+ 2 Laps	18	6
16	20	(United Kingdom) Katherine Legge	PKV Racing	63	+ 3 Laps	13	5
17	8	(Mexico) Mario Domínguez	Rocketsports Racing	59	Retired	11	4
18	14	(United Kingdom) Dan Clarke	CTE Racing - HVM	7	Differential	6	3

== Final championship standings ==
- **Bold** indicates the Season Champion.

Drivers' Championship standings

	Pos	Driver	Points
	1	(France) **Sébastien Bourdais**	387
1	2	(United Kingdom) Justin Wilson	298
1	3	(United States) A. J. Allmendinger	285
	4	(France) Nelson Philippe	231
2	5	(Brazil) Bruno Junqueira	219

- Note: Only the top five positions are included.

Previous race: 2006 Lexmark Indy 300	Champ Car World Series; 2006 season	Next race: 2007 Vegas Grand Prix; Next Season
Previous race: 2005 Gran Premio Telmex/Tecate	2006 Gran Premio Telmex	Next race: 2007 Gran Premio Tecate
