= 2006 Grand Prix of Portland =

(United States) 2006 Portland
Race details
- Race 5 of 14 in the 2006 Champ Car season
- Portland International Raceway Track Layout
- Date: June 18, 2006
- Official name: Grand Prix of Portland Presented by G.I. Joe's
- Location: Portland International Raceway; Portland, Oregon, United States
- Course: Permanent Road Course; 1.964 mi / 3.161 km
- Distance: 105 laps 206.220 mi / 331.905 km
- Weather: Temperatures reaching up to 71.1 °F (21.7 °C); wind speeds reaching up to 11.1 miles per hour (17.9 km/h)

Pole position
- Driver: (Brazil) Bruno Junqueira (Newman/Haas Racing)
- Time: 57.631

Fastest lap
- Driver: Will Power (Team Australia)
- Time: 59.259 (on lap 70 of 105)

Podium
- First: (United States) A. J. Allmendinger (Forsythe Championship Racing)
- Second: (United Kingdom) Justin Wilson (RuSPORT)
- Third: (France) Sébastien Bourdais (Newman/Haas Racing)

The 2006 Grand Prix of Portland was the fifth round of the 2006 Bridgestone Presents the Champ Car World Series Powered by Ford season, held on June 18, 2006, at the Portland International Raceway in Portland, Oregon. Bruno Junqueira won the pole. Junqueira's Pole Position was ninth and final of his career. A. J. Allmendinger won the race, his first Champ Car victory, in his first race since leaving RuSPORT, the team which brought him to Champ Car, for Forsythe Championship Racing.

== Qualifying results ==
Pos	Nat	Name	Team	Qual 1	Qual 2	Best
1	(Brazil)	Bruno Junqueira	Newman/Haas Racing	59.576	57.631	57.631
2	(United States)	A. J. Allmendinger	Forsythe Racing	58.378	57.639	57.639
3	(France)	Sébastien Bourdais	Newman/Haas Racing	58.464	57.646	57.646
4	(United Kingdom)	Justin Wilson	RuSPORT	59.283	57.818	57.818
5	(Brazil)	Cristiano da Matta	RuSPORT	59.575	58.018	58.018
6	(United Kingdom)	Dan Clarke	CTE Racing-HVM	59.416	58.214	58.214
7	(Australia)	Will Power	Team Australia	59.160	58.244	58.244
8	(France)	Nelson Philippe	CTE Racing-HVM	59.354	58.297	58.297
9	(Canada)	Alex Tagliani	Team Australia	59.275	58.328	58.328
10	(Canada)	Paul Tracy	Forsythe Racing	59.121	58.376	58.376
11	(Netherlands)	Nicky Pastorelli	Rocketsports Racing	1:00.333	58.826	58.826
12	(Spain)	Oriol Servià	PKV Racing	59.485	58.830	58.830
13	(Canada)	Andrew Ranger	Mi-Jack Conquest Racing	59.633	58.885	58.885
14	(Mexico)	Mario Domínguez	Dale Coyne Racing	1:00.035	59.233	59.233
15	(United Kingdom)	Katherine Legge	PKV Racing	59.903	59.297	59.297
16	(Netherlands)	Charles Zwolsman Jr.	Mi-Jack Conquest Racing	1:00.612	59.315	59.315
17	(Belgium)	Jan Heylen	Dale Coyne Racing	59.861	59.589	59.589
18	(Estonia)	Tõnis Kasemets	Rocketsports Racing	1:01.089	1:00.607	1:00.607

== Race ==
Pos	No	Driver	Team	Laps	Time/Retired	Grid	Points
1	7	(United States) A. J. Allmendinger	Forsythe Racing	105	1:48:32.853	2	33
2	9	(United Kingdom) Justin Wilson	RuSPORT	105	+5.420 secs	4	27
3	1	(France) Sébastien Bourdais	Newman/Haas Racing	105	+6.006 secs	3	26
4	2	(Brazil) Bruno Junqueira	Newman/Haas Racing	105	+36.368 secs	1	24
5	10	(Brazil) Cristiano da Matta	RuSPORT	105	+39.552 secs	5	21
6	14	(United Kingdom) Dan Clarke	CTE Racing-HVM	105	+50.287 secs	6	19
7	3	(Canada) Paul Tracy	Forsythe Racing	105	+52.296 secs	10	17
8	4	(France) Nelson Philippe	CTE Racing-HVM	105	+52.677 secs	8	15
9	27	(Canada) Andrew Ranger	Mi-Jack Conquest Racing	104	+ 1 Lap	13	14
10	6	(Spain) Oriol Servià	PKV Racing	104	+ 1 Lap	12	11
11	15	(Canada) Alex Tagliani	Team Australia	104	+ 1 Lap	9	10
12	34	(Netherlands) Charles Zwolsman Jr.	Mi-Jack Conquest Racing	103	+ 2 Laps	16	9
13	20	(United Kingdom) Katherine Legge	PKV Racing	103	+ 2 Laps	15	8
14	19	(Mexico) Mario Domínguez	Dale Coyne Racing	103	+ 2 Laps	14	7
15	11	(Belgium) Jan Heylen	Dale Coyne Racing	103	+ 2 Laps	17	6
16	18	(Estonia) Tõnis Kasemets	Rocketsports Racing	102	+ 3 Laps	18	5
17	8	(Netherlands) Nicky Pastorelli	Rocketsports Racing	101	+ 4 Laps	11	4
18	5	(Australia) Will Power	Team Australia	92	+ 13 Laps	7	4

== Caution flags ==
Laps	Cause
1	Yellow start

== Notes ==
Laps	Leader
1-31	A. J. Allmendinger
32	Sébastien Bourdais
33-62	A. J. Allmendinger
63-65	Sébastien Bourdais
66-84	A. J. Allmendinger
85	Sébastien Bourdais
86-105	A. J. Allmendinger

Driver	Laps led
A. J. Allmendinger	100
Sébastien Bourdais	5

- New Race Lap Record Will Power 59.259
- New Race Record A. J. Allmendinger 1:48:32.853
- Average Speed 113.989 mph

== Championship standings after the race ==
Drivers' Championship standings

	Pos	Driver	Points
	1	(France) Sébastien Bourdais	162
	2	(United Kingdom) Justin Wilson	132
2	3	(United States) A. J. Allmendinger	102
1	4	(Canada) Andrew Ranger	89
2	5	(Canada) Paul Tracy	76

- Note: Only the top five positions are included.

Previous race: 2006 Time Warner Cable Road Runner 225	Champ Car World Series; 2006 season	Next race: 2006 Grand Prix of Cleveland
Previous race: 2005 G.I. Joe's Champ Car Grand Prix of Portland	2006 Grand Prix of Portland	Next race: 2007 Mazda Champ Car Grand Prix of Portland
