= 2006 Grand Prix of Denver =

(United States) 2006 Denver
Race details
- Race 10 of 14 in the 2006 Champ Car season
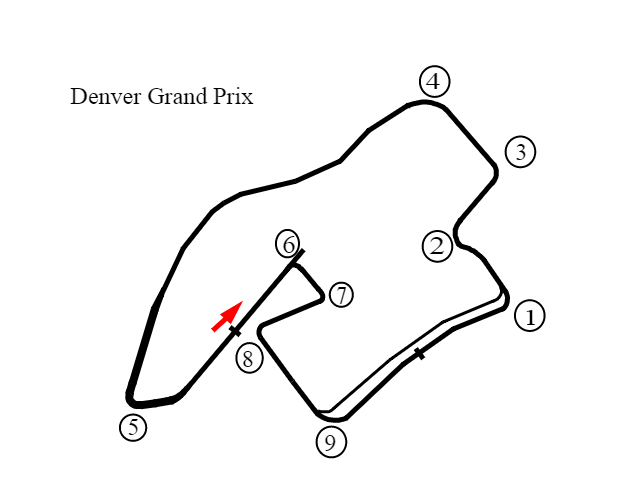
- Date: August 13, 2006
- Official name: 2006 Grand Prix of Denver
- Location: The Streets of Denver, Colorado, United States
- Course: Temporary street circuit 1.647 mi / 2.651 km
- Distance: 97 laps 159.759 mi / 257.147 km
- Weather: Sunny with temperatures reaching up to 80.1 °F (26.7 °C); wind speeds approaching 11.1 miles per hour (17.9 km/h)

Pole position
- Driver: (France) Sébastien Bourdais (Newman/Haas Racing)
- Time: 59.096

Fastest lap
- Driver: (France) Sébastien Bourdais (Newman/Haas Racing)
- Time: 1:00.314 (on lap 90 of 97)

Podium
- First: (United States) A. J. Allmendinger (Forsythe Championship Racing)
- Second: (Brazil) Bruno Junqueira (Newman/Haas Racing)
- Third: (United Kingdom) Dan Clarke (CTE Racing-HVM)

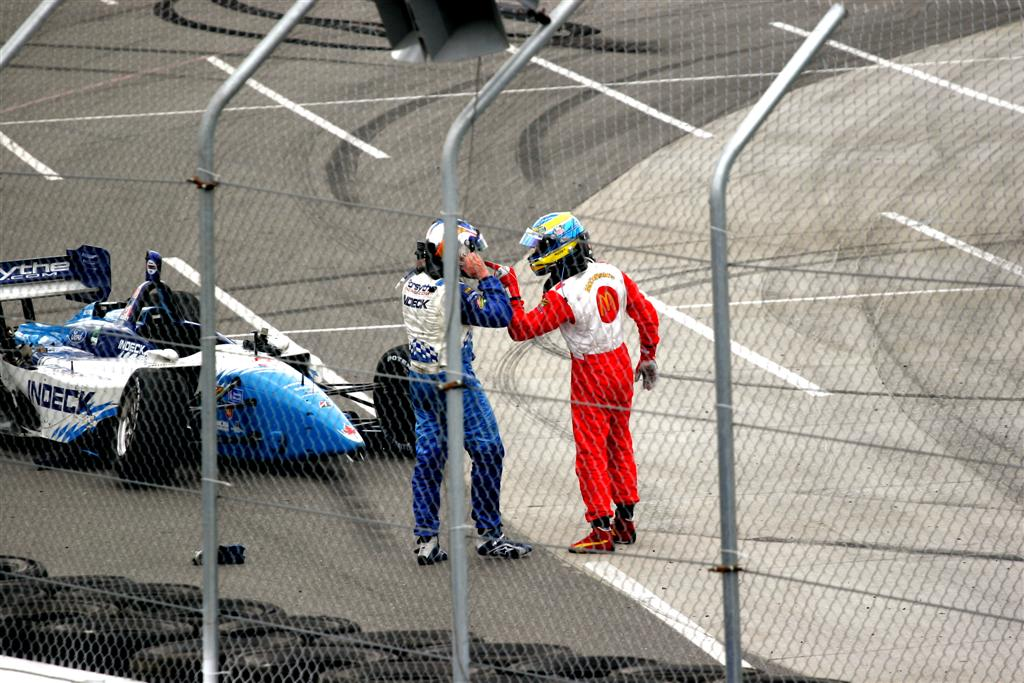
Paul Tracy and Sébastien Bourdais in a confrontation at the 2006 Denver Grand Prix.

The 2006 Grand Prix of Denver was the tenth round of the 2006 Bridgestone Presents the Champ Car World Series Powered by Ford season, held on August 13, 2006 on the streets of Denver, Colorado. Sébastien Bourdais took the pole while the race was won by A. J. Allmendinger. Bourdais' race ended when he and Paul Tracy crashed in the final turn of the final lap of the race as Tracy attempted to pass Bourdais to take second place. Tracy and Bourdais got into a confrontation outside their cars (pictured). Tracy was subsequently fined and penalized three championship points for avoidable contact for the incident.

== Qualifying results ==
| Pos | Nat | Name | Team | Qual 1 | Qual 2 | Best |
|---|---|---|---|---|---|---|
| 1 | (France) | Sébastien Bourdais | Newman/Haas Racing | 1:00.763 | 59.096 | 59.096 |
| 2 | (United States) | A. J. Allmendinger | Forsythe Racing | 1:00.714 | 59.350 | 59.350 |
| 3 | (United Kingdom) | Justin Wilson | RuSPORT | 1:00.991 | 59.878 | 59.878 |
| 4 | (Canada) | Paul Tracy | Forsythe Racing | 1:05.531 | 59.903 | 59.903 |
| 5 | (Canada) | Alex Tagliani | Team Australia | 1:00.988 | 59.919 | 59.919 |
| 6 | (Canada) | Andrew Ranger | Mi-Jack Conquest Racing | 1:01.724 | 1:00.007 | 1:00.007 |
| 7 | (Brazil) | Bruno Junqueira | Newman/Haas Racing | 1:01.141 | 1:00.029 | 1:00.029 |
| 8 | (Spain) | Oriol Servià | PKV Racing | 1:01.302 | 1:00.096 | 1:00.096 |
| 9 | (Mexico) | Mario Domínguez | Dale Coyne Racing | 1:01.304 | 1:00.147 | 1:00.147 |
| 10 | (France) | Nelson Philippe | CTE Racing-HVM | 1:01.767 | 1:00.333 | 1:00.333 |
| 11 | (Australia) | Will Power | Team Australia | 1:01.599 | 1:00.405 | 1:00.405 |
| 12 | (Netherlands) | Charles Zwolsman Jr. | Mi-Jack Conquest Racing | 1:01.644 | 1:00.453 | 1:00.453 |
| 13 | (United Kingdom) | Dan Clarke | CTE Racing-HVM | 1:02.706 | 1:00.887 | 1:00.887 |
| 14 | (Belgium) | Jan Heylen | Dale Coyne Racing | 1:02.502 | 1:01.201 | 1:01.201 |
| 15 | (United Kingdom) | Katherine Legge | PKV Racing | 1:01.777 | 1:01.370 | 1:01.370 |
| 16 | (Netherlands) | Nicky Pastorelli | Rocketsports Racing | 1:04.251 | 1:03.472 | 1:03.472 |

== Race ==
| Pos | No | Driver | Team | Laps | Time/Retired | Grid | Points |
|---|---|---|---|---|---|---|---|
| 1 | 7 | (United States) A. J. Allmendinger | Forsythe Racing | 97 | 1:44:59.557 | 2 | 33 |
| 2 | 2 | (Brazil) Bruno Junqueira | Newman/Haas Racing | 97 | +20.588 secs | 7 | 28 |
| 3 | 14 | (United Kingdom) Dan Clarke | CTE Racing-HVM | 97 | +50.261 secs | 13 | 26 |
| 4 | 5 | (Australia) Will Power | Team Australia | 97 | +55.915 secs | 11 | 23 |
| 5 | 4 | (France) Nelson Philippe | CTE Racing-HVM | 97 | +1:14.187 | 10 | 21 |
| 6 | 3 | (Canada) Paul Tracy | Forsythe Racing | 96 | Contact | 4 | 16^{*} |
| 7 | 1 | (France) Sébastien Bourdais | Newman/Haas Racing | 96 | Contact | 1 | 20 |
| 8 | 9 | (United Kingdom) Justin Wilson | RuSPORT | 96 | + 1 Lap | 3 | 16 |
| 9 | 20 | (United Kingdom) Katherine Legge | PKV Racing | 96 | + 1 Lap | 15 | 13 |
| 10 | 34 | (Netherlands) Charles Zwolsman Jr. | Mi-Jack Conquest Racing | 95 | + 2 Laps | 12 | 11 |
| 11 | 11 | (Belgium) Jan Heylen | Dale Coyne Racing | 95 | + 2 Laps | 14 | 10 |
| 12 | 8 | (Netherlands) Nicky Pastorelli | Rocketsports Racing | 27 | Brakes | 16 | 9 |
| 13 | 19 | (Mexico) Mario Domínguez | Dale Coyne Racing | 21 | Suspension | 9 | 8 |
| 14 | 27 | (Canada) Andrew Ranger | Mi-Jack Conquest Racing | 18 | Gearbox | 6 | 7 |
| 15 | 6 | (Spain) Oriol Servià | PKV Racing | 14 | Engine | 8 | 6 |
| 16 | 15 | (Canada) Alex Tagliani | Team Australia | 0 | Contact | 5 | 5 |

^{*} Paul Tracy, who was already on probation for an incident and fight with Alex Tagliani at the prior race in San Jose, was penalized 3 points and fined $25,000 for avoidable contact for his part in a final lap accident with Sébastien Bourdais. His probation was extended to include the Surfer's Paradise event. Bourdais was not assessed a penalty.

== Caution flags ==
| Laps | Cause |
|---|---|
| 1-2 | Tracy (3) spin/stall |
| 35-38 | Debris |

== Notes ==
| Laps | Leader |
|---|---|
| 1-20 | Sébastien Bourdais |
| 21-31 | Bruno Junqueira |
| 32-47 | Sébastien Bourdais |
| 48-59 | A. J. Allmendinger |
| 60-61 | Justin Wilson |
| 62-64 | Bruno Junqueira |
| 65-97 | A. J. Allmendinger |

| Driver | Laps led |
|---|---|
| A. J. Allmendinger | 45 |
| Sébastien Bourdais | 36 |
| Bruno Junqueira | 14 |
| Justin Wilson | 2 |

- New Track Record Sébastien Bourdais 59.096 (Qualification Session #2)
- New Race Lap Record Sébastien Bourdais 1:00.314
- New Race Record A. J. Allmendinger 1:44:59.557
- Average Speed 91.852 mph

== Championship standings after the race ==
Drivers' Championship standings

| | Pos | Driver | Points |
|---|---|---|---|
| | 1 | (France) Sébastien Bourdais | 275 |
| 1 | 2 | (United States) A. J. Allmendinger | 243 |
| 1 | 3 | (United Kingdom) Justin Wilson | 240 |
| 5 | 4 | (France) Nelson Philippe | 149 |
| 1 | 5 | (Mexico) Mario Domínguez | 149 |

- Note: Only the top five positions are included.

| Previous race: 2006 Canary Foundation Grand Prix of San Jose | Champ Car World Series; 2006 season | Next race: 2006 Champ Car Grand Prix de Montreal |
| Previous race: 2005 Centrix Financial Grand Prix of Denver | 2006 Grand Prix of Denver | Next race: Final Event |
