= 2006 Grand Prix of Road America =

(United States) 2006 Road America
Race details
- Race 12 of 14 in the 2006 Champ Car season
- Road America Track Layout
- Date: September 24, 2006
- Official name: Grand Prix of Road America
- Location: Road America; Elkhart Lake, Wisconsin, United States
- Course: Permanent Road Course; 4.048 mi / 6.515 km
- Distance: 51 laps 206.448 mi / 332.265 km
- Weather: Sunny with temperatures soaring up to 63 °F (17 °C); wind speeds up to 15.9 miles per hour (25.6 km/h)

Pole position
- Driver: (United Kingdom) Dan Clarke (CTE Racing-HVM)
- Time: 1:55.123

Fastest lap
- Driver: (France) Sébastien Bourdais (Newman/Haas Racing)
- Time: 1:44.133 (on lap 26 of 51)

Podium
- First: (United States) A. J. Allmendinger (Forsythe Championship Racing)
- Second: (Brazil) Bruno Junqueira (Newman/Haas Racing)
- Third: (France) Sébastien Bourdais (Newman/Haas Racing)

The 2006 Grand Prix of Road America was the twelfth round of the 2006 Bridgestone Presents the Champ Car World Series Powered by Ford season, held on September 24, 2006 at Road America in Elkhart Lake, Wisconsin. Dan Clarke took the pole, the first and only of his Champ Car career. A. J. Allmendinger won the race, his fifth and last win of the year and his Champ Car career. The event is most remembered for a horrific crash involving Katherine Legge that resulted a 42-minute red flag. The rear wing on her car failed just before the high speed Turn 11 Kink, the unexpected loss of downforce caused her to crash violently into the catch fence, demolishing the car. Legge was uninjured in the incident.

== Qualifying results ==
Pos	Nat	Name	Team	Qual 1	Qual 2	Best
1	(United Kingdom)	Dan Clarke	CTE Racing-HVM	1:55.123	—	1:55.123
2	(France)	Sébastien Bourdais	Newman/Haas Racing	1:58.945	2:06.460	1:58.945
3	(Netherlands)	Charles Zwolsman Jr.	Mi-Jack Conquest Racing	1:55.599	2:11.121	1:55.599
4	(Canada)	Alex Tagliani	Team Australia	1:57.517	2:09.891	1:57.517
5	(United States)	A. J. Allmendinger	Forsythe Racing	1:58.507	2:07.969	1:58.507
6	(United Kingdom)	Justin Wilson	RuSPORT	1:59.076	2:06.994	1:59.076
7	(Australia)	Will Power	Team Australia	1:59.286	2:07.683	1:59.286
8	(United Kingdom)	Katherine Legge	PKV Racing	1:59.388	2:12.916	1:59.388
9	(Canada)	Andrew Ranger	Mi-Jack Conquest Racing	1:59.486	4:09.032	1:59.486
10	(Brazil)	Bruno Junqueira	Newman/Haas Racing	1:59.977	—	1:59.977
11	(Canada)	Paul Tracy	Forsythe Racing	2:00.165	2:08.767	2:00.165
12	(Belgium)	Jan Heylen	Dale Coyne Racing	2:00.835	2:11.400	2:00.835
13	(Spain)	Oriol Servià	PKV Racing	2:01.082	2:10.782	2:01.082
14	(Estonia)	Tõnis Kasemets	Rocketsports Racing	2:01.381	2:10.273	2:01.381
15	(Mexico)	Mario Domínguez	Rocketsports Racing	2:01.882	2:11.076	2:01.882
16	(France)	Nelson Philippe	CTE Racing-HVM	2:02.273	2:10.028	2:02.273
17	(Uruguay)	Juan Cáceres	Dale Coyne Racing	2:03.690	2:13.169	2:03.690

== Race ==
Pos	No	Driver	Team	Laps	Time/Retired	Grid	Points
1	7	(United States) A. J. Allmendinger	Forsythe Racing	51	1:54:43.700	5	32
2	2	(Brazil) Bruno Junqueira	Newman/Haas Racing	51	+0.675 secs	10	28
3	1	(France) Sébastien Bourdais	Newman/Haas Racing	51	+0.988 secs	2	28
4	6	(Spain) Oriol Servià	PKV Racing	51	+2.637 secs	13	24
5	9	(United Kingdom) Justin Wilson	RuSPORT	51	+3.763 secs	6	21
6	14	(United Kingdom) Dan Clarke	CTE Racing-HVM	51	+4.746 secs	1	21
7	34	(Netherlands) Charles Zwolsman Jr.	Mi-Jack Conquest Racing	51	+5.537 secs	3	18
8	27	(Canada) Andrew Ranger	Mi-Jack Conquest Racing	51	+7.359 secs	9	15
9	11	(Belgium) Jan Heylen	Dale Coyne Racing	51	+8.668 secs	12	13
10	3	(Canada) Paul Tracy	Forsythe Racing	51	+9.018 secs	11	11
11	15	(Canada) Alex Tagliani	Team Australia	51	+13.172 secs	4	10
12	8	(Mexico) Mario Domínguez	Rocketsports Racing	51	+20.151 secs	15	9
13	5	(Australia) Will Power	Team Australia	50	+ 1 Lap	7	8
14	4	(France) Nelson Philippe	CTE Racing-HVM	50	+ 1 Lap	16	7
15	19	(Uruguay) Juan Cáceres	Dale Coyne Racing	50	+ 1 Lap	17	6
16	20	(United Kingdom) Katherine Legge	PKV Racing	45	Accident	8	5
17	18	(Estonia) Tõnis Kasemets	Rocketsports Racing	14	Gearbox	14	4

== Caution flags ==
Laps	Cause
1–3	Junqueira (2), Power (5) & Heylen (11) crash
18–20	Power (5) off course
27–29	Cáceres (19) off course
30–31	Junqueira (2) & Ranger (27) crash
33–34	Tracy (3) off course
46–49	Legge (20) crash (42-minute red flag)

== Notes ==
Laps	Leader
1–3	Dan Clarke
4	Charles Zwolsman Jr.
5–28	Sébastien Bourdais
29–40	Bruno Junqueira
41–44	Sébastien Bourdais
45–51	A. J. Allmendinger

Driver	Laps led
Sébastien Bourdais	28
Bruno Junqueira	12
A. J. Allmendinger	7
Dan Clarke	3
Charles Zwolsman Jr.	1

- New Race Record A. J. Allmendinger 1:54:43.700
- Average Speed 107.967 mph

== Championship standings after the race ==
Drivers' Championship standings

	Pos	Driver	Points
	1	(France) Sébastien Bourdais	338
1	2	(United States) A. J. Allmendinger	280
1	3	(United Kingdom) Justin Wilson	269
1	4	(Canada) Paul Tracy	184
1	5	(France) Nelson Philippe	182

- Note: Only the top five positions are included.

Previous race: 2006 Champ Car Grand Prix de Montreal	Champ Car World Series; 2006 season	Next race: 2006 Lexmark Indy 300
Previous race: 2004 Grand Prix of Road America	2006 Grand Prix of Road America	Next race: 2007 Generac Grand Prix
