= 2006 Time Warner Cable Road Runner 225 =

Open-wheel race held in Wisconsin, USA

(United States) 2006 Milwaukee
Race details
- Race 4 of 14 in the 2006 Champ Car season
- Milwaukee Mile Track Layout
- Date: June 4, 2006
- Official name: Time Warner Cable Road Runner 225
- Location: Milwaukee Mile; West Allis, Wisconsin, United States
- Course: 1-Mile Oval; 1.000 mi / 1.609 km
- Distance: 197 laps 197 mi / 317.04 km
- Weather: Partly cloudy with temperatures reaching a high of 75.2 °F (24.0 °C); wind speeds reaching up to 9.9 miles per hour (15.9 km/h)

Pole position
- Driver: (France) Sébastien Bourdais (Newman/Haas Racing)
- Time: 21.182

Fastest lap
- Driver: (France) Sébastien Bourdais (Newman/Haas Racing)
- Time: 22.285 (on lap 168 of 197)

Podium
- First: (France) Sébastien Bourdais (Newman/Haas Racing)
- Second: (United Kingdom) Justin Wilson (RuSPORT)
- Third: (France) Nelson Philippe (CTE Racing-HVM)

Chronology
Previous	Next
2005	2006 (IndyCar)

The 2006 Time Warner Cable Road Runner 225 was the fourth round of the 2006 Bridgestone Presents the Champ Car World Series Powered by Ford season, held on June 4, 2006, on the Milwaukee Mile oval in West Allis, Wisconsin. Sébastien Bourdais took the pole and the win, his fourth consecutive victory to open the year. It was the final CART/Champ Car event to take place on an oval prior to the reunification of American open-wheel racing in 2008.

== Qualifying results ==
Pos	Nat	Name	Team	Best Lap	Qual Time
1	(France)	Sébastien Bourdais	Newman/Haas Racing	1	21.182
2	(Brazil)	Bruno Junqueira	Newman/Haas Racing	1	21.275
3	(United States)	A. J. Allmendinger	RuSPORT	2	21.398
4	(United Kingdom)	Justin Wilson	RuSPORT	1	21.420
5	(Australia)	Will Power	Team Australia	2	21.438
6	(Mexico)	Mario Domínguez	Forsythe Racing	2	21.463
7	(Spain)	Oriol Servià	PKV Racing	1	21.479
8	(United Kingdom)	Katherine Legge	PKV Racing	2	21.578
9	(France)	Nelson Philippe	CTE Racing-HVM	2	21.594
10	(Canada)	Paul Tracy	Forsythe Racing	2	21.647
11	(United Kingdom)	Dan Clarke	CTE Racing-HVM	2	21.980
12	(Canada)	Andrew Ranger	Mi-Jack Conquest Racing	2	22.194
13	(Netherlands)	Charles Zwolsman Jr.	Mi-Jack Conquest Racing	2	22.237
14	(Belgium)	Jan Heylen	Dale Coyne Racing	2	22.417
15	(Netherlands)	Nicky Pastorelli	Rocketsports Racing	2	23.522
16	(Canada)	Alex Tagliani	Team Australia	-	No time
17	(Brazil)	Cristiano da Matta	Dale Coyne Racing	-	No time

== Race ==
Pos	No	Driver	Team	Laps	Time/Retired	Grid	Points
1	1	(France) Sébastien Bourdais	Newman/Haas Racing	197	1:45:03.946	1	34
2	9	(United Kingdom) Justin Wilson	RuSPORT	197	+3.613 secs	4	28
3	4	(France) Nelson Philippe	CTE Racing-HVM	197	+5.641 secs	9	26
4	10	(United States) A. J. Allmendinger	RuSPORT	197	+18.504 secs	3	24
5	6	(Spain) Oriol Servià	PKV Racing	196	+ 1 Lap	7	21
6	20	(United Kingdom) Katherine Legge	PKV Racing	195	+ 2 Laps	8	20
7	27	(Canada) Andrew Ranger	Mi-Jack Conquest Racing	194	+ 3 Laps	12	17
8	14	(United Kingdom) Dan Clarke	CTE Racing-HVM	191	+ 6 Laps	11	15
9	34	(Netherlands) Charles Zwolsman Jr.	Mi-Jack Conquest Racing	191	+ 6 Laps	13	13
10	8	(Netherlands) Nicky Pastorelli	Rocketsports Racing	183	+ 14 Laps	15	11
11	5	(Australia) Will Power	Team Australia	155	CV joint	5	10
12	11	(Belgium) Jan Heylen	Dale Coyne Racing	67	Electrical	14	9
13	19	(Brazil) Cristiano da Matta	Dale Coyne Racing	31	Oil leak	17	8
14	7	(Mexico) Mario Domínguez	Forsythe Racing	4	Suspension	6	0^{*}
15	2	(Brazil) Bruno Junqueira	Newman/Haas Racing	1	Contact	2	6
16	3	(Canada) Paul Tracy	Forsythe Racing	1	Contact	10	5
-	15	(Canada) Alex Tagliani	Team Australia	0	Withdrawn	16	0†

^{*} Mario Domínguez was stripped of his points for this race for avoidable contact during the first lap of the race. He was also put on probation for the next three events.
† The car of Alex Tagliani was withdrawn from the event after heavy contact with the wall damaged his car beyond repair during the first practice period.

== Caution flags ==
Laps	Cause
1	Yellow start
2-13	Domínguez (7), Tracy (3) & Junqueira (2) crash
25-29	Clarke (14) spin, stall
55-70	Philippe (4) debris; Heylen (11) stall
152-165	Debris

== Notes ==
Laps	Leader
1-20	Sébastien Bourdais
21-27	A. J. Allmendinger
28-39	Katherine Legge
40-100	Justin Wilson
101-197	Sébastien Bourdais

Driver	Laps led
Sébastien Bourdais	117
Justin Wilson	61
Katherine Legge	12
A. J. Allmendinger	7

- New Race Record Sébastien Bourdais 1:45:03.946
- Average Speed 116.101 mph
- This was the final time that powerhouse team Newman/Haas Racing locked out the front row in Champ Car competition. However, both cars would brace the front row for the IRL-sanctioned 2009 RoadRunner Turbo Indy 300.

== Championship standings after the race ==
Drivers' Championship standings

	Pos	Driver	Points
	1	(France) Sébastien Bourdais	136
	2	(United Kingdom) Justin Wilson	105
1	3	(Canada) Andrew Ranger	75
1	4	(Mexico) Mario Domínguez	69
3	5	(United States) A. J. Allmendinger	69

- Note: Only the top five positions are included.

Previous race: 2006 Tecate Grand Prix of Monterrey	Champ Car World Series; 2006 season	Next race: 2006 Grand Prix of Portland
Previous race: 2005 Time Warner Cable Road Runner 225	Milwaukee Mile	Next race: 2007 ABC Supply Company A.J. Foyt 225; IndyCar Series Event
