= 2006 Toyota Grand Prix of Long Beach =

First race of the 2006 Champ Car World Series

(United States) 2006 Toyota Grand Prix of Long Beach
Race details
- Race 1 of 14 in the 2006 Champ Car season
- Long Beach Track Layout
- Date: April 9, 2006
- Official name: Toyota Grand Prix of Long Beach
- Location: Long Beach Street Circuit; Long Beach, California, United States
- Course: Temporary street circuit 1.968 mi / 3.167 km
- Distance: 74 laps 145.632 mi / 234.358 km
- Weather: Temperatures reaching up to 68 °F (20 °C); wind speeds reaching up to 11.1 miles per hour (17.9 km/h)

Pole position
- Driver: (France) Sébastien Bourdais (Newman/Haas Racing)
- Time: 1:06.886

Fastest lap
- Driver: (France) Sébastien Bourdais (Newman/Haas Racing)
- Time: 1:07.931 (on lap 71 of 74)

Podium
- First: (France) Sébastien Bourdais (Newman/Haas Racing)
- Second: (United Kingdom) Justin Wilson (RuSPORT)
- Third: (Canada) Alex Tagliani (Team Australia)

Chronology
Previous	Next
2005	2007

The 2006 Toyota Grand Prix of Long Beach was the first round of the 2006 Bridgestone Presents the Champ Car World Series Powered by Ford season, held on April 9, 2006, on the streets of Long Beach, California. The pole and race win were both captured by the two-time running Champ Car champion, Sébastien Bourdais.

The race marked Bruno Junqueira's return to the series after his 2005 Indianapolis 500 crash, which resulted in a concussion and a fractured vertebrae, sidelined him for the 2005 season. The race was also billed at the time as Jimmy Vasser's final Champ Car race, ending a 15-year career that featured 10 wins and the series championship in 1996, though he would later make a come out of retirement to drive in the 2008 Toyota Grand Prix of Long Beach, the final race run under Champ Car sanction.

== Qualifying results ==
Pos	No.	Name	Team	Qual 1	Qual 2	Best
1	1	(France) Sébastien Bourdais	Newman/Haas Racing	1:07.675	1:06.886	1:06.886
2	9	(United Kingdom) Justin Wilson	RuSPORT	1:08.318	1:07.208	1:07.208
3	2	(Brazil) Bruno Junqueira	Newman/Haas Racing	1:07.741	1:07.225	1:07.225
4	10	(United States) A. J. Allmendinger	RuSPORT	1:08.030	1:07.249	1:07.249
5	7	(Mexico) Mario Domínguez	Forsythe Racing	1:08.871	1:07.301	1:07.301
6	3	(Canada) Paul Tracy	Forsythe Racing	1:07.947	1:07.408	1:07.408
7	15	(Canada) Alex Tagliani	Team Australia	1:08.102	1:07.717	1:07.717
8	6	(Spain) Oriol Servià	PKV Racing	1:08.753	1:07.869	1:07.869
9	5	(Australia) Will Power	Team Australia	1:08.515	1:07.965	1:07.965
10	19	(Brazil) Cristiano da Matta	Dale Coyne Racing	1:08.594	1:07.982	1:07.982
11	8	(Brazil) Antônio Pizzonia	Rocketsports Racing	1:09.476	1:08.242	1:08.242
12	12	(United States) Jimmy Vasser	PKV Racing	1:09.091	1:08.246	1:08.246
13	14	(United Kingdom) Dan Clarke	CTE Racing-HVM	1:08.766	1:08.410	1:08.410
14	11	(Belgium) Jan Heylen	Dale Coyne Racing	1:11.078	1:08.641	1:08.641
15	4	(France) Nelson Philippe	CTE Racing-HVM	1:08.905	1:08.647	1:08.647
16	27	(Canada) Andrew Ranger	Mi-Jack Conquest Racing	1:10.063	1:08.855	1:08.855
17	20	(United Kingdom) Katherine Legge	PKV Racing	1:09.747	1:09.254	1:09.254
18	34	(Netherlands) Charles Zwolsman Jr.	Mi-Jack Conquest Racing	1:10.147	1:09.554	1:09.554

== Race ==
Pos	No	Driver	Team	Laps	Time/Retired	Grid	Points
1	1	(France) Sébastien Bourdais	Newman/Haas Racing	74	1:40:07.670	1	35
2	9	(United Kingdom) Justin Wilson	RuSPORT	74	+14.096 secs	2	27
3	15	(Canada) Alex Tagliani	Team Australia	74	+20.485 secs	7	25
4	7	(Mexico) Mario Domínguez	Forsythe Racing	74	+22.612 secs	5	23
5	19	(Brazil) Cristiano da Matta	Dale Coyne Racing	74	+36.800 secs	10	21
6	27	(Canada) Andrew Ranger	Mi-Jack Conquest Racing	74	+54.924 secs	16	20
7	11	(Belgium) Jan Heylen	Dale Coyne Racing	74	+1:01.648	14	18
8	20	(United Kingdom) Katherine Legge	PKV Racing	74	+1:02.208	17	15
9	5	(Australia) Will Power	Team Australia	73	+ 1 Lap	9	13
10	8	(Brazil) Antônio Pizzonia	Rocketsports Racing	73	+ 1 Lap	11	11
11	14	(United Kingdom) Dan Clarke	CTE Racing-HVM	72	+ 2 Laps	13	10
12	34	(Netherlands) Charles Zwolsman Jr.	Mi-Jack Conquest Racing	67	Suspension	18	9
13	4	(France) Nelson Philippe	CTE Racing-HVM	46	Gearbox	15	8
14	12	(United States) Jimmy Vasser	PKV Racing	24	Engine	12	7
15	2	(Brazil) Bruno Junqueira	Newman/Haas Racing	1	Sidepod	3	6
16	10	(United States) A. J. Allmendinger	RuSPORT	0	Contact	4	5
17	3	(Canada) Paul Tracy	Forsythe Racing	0	Contact	6	4
18	6	(Spain) Oriol Servià	PKV Racing	0	Contact	8	3

Previous race: 2005 Gran Premio Telmex/Tecate; Previous Season	Champ Car World Series; 2006 season	Next race: 2006 Grand Prix of Houston
Previous race: 2005 Toyota Grand Prix of Long Beach	2006 Toyota Grand Of Prix of Long Beach	Next race: 2007 Toyota Grand Prix of Long Beach
