= 2006 Grand Prix of Houston =

Second race of the 2006 Champ Car season

(United States) 2006 Grand Prix of Houston
Race details
- Race 2 of 14 in the 2006 Champ Car season
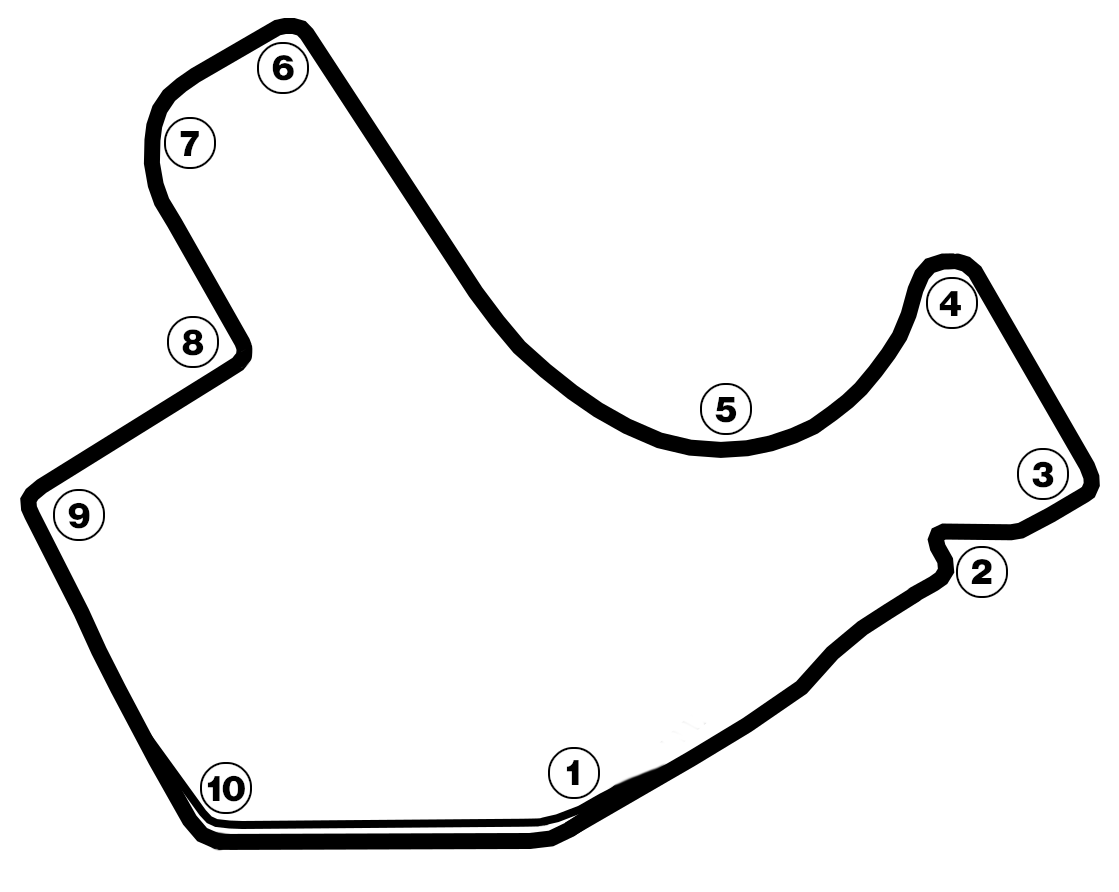
- Reliant Park track layout
- Date: May 13, 2006
- Official name: Grand Prix of Houston
- Location: Reliant Park Street Course; Houston, Texas, United States
- Course: Temporary street circuit 1.690 mi / 2.720 km
- Distance: 96 laps 162.240 mi / 261.099 km
- Weather: Partly cloudy with temperatures hovering around 72.3 °F (22.4 °C); wind speeds reaching up to 12 miles per hour (19 km/h)

Pole position
- Driver: (Mexico) Mario Domínguez (Forsythe Championship Racing)
- Time: 58.026

Fastest lap
- Driver: (France) Sébastien Bourdais (Newman/Haas Racing)
- Time: 1:00.176 (on lap 25 of 96)

Podium
- First: (France) Sébastien Bourdais (Newman/Haas Racing)
- Second: (Canada) Paul Tracy (Forsythe Championship Racing)
- Third: (Mexico) Mario Domínguez (Forsythe Championship Racing)

The 2006 Grand Prix of Houston was the second round of the 2006 Bridgestone Presents the Champ Car World Series Powered by Ford season, held on May 13, 2006, on the streets around Reliant Park in Houston, Texas. It was the first event in Houston since a race on a downtown circuit in 2001.

On Friday, a temporary chicane was added between the first two turns and the race was shortened from 115 to 100 laps. Mario Domínguez won the pole, his first and only of his career. Sébastien Bourdais started fifth but took the lead late in the race and held off Paul Tracy to win his second consecutive race of the season, the first defending champion to do so since Rick Mears in 1982. Tracy was frustrated with Champ Car officials after only warning Bourdais of blocking claiming that "when you're Sebastien Bourdais you can do what you want." Following the race, Alex Tagliani was taken to a local hospital after experiencing back pain from the bumpy circuit.

== Qualifying results ==
Pos	No.	Name	Team	Qual 1	Qual 2	Best
1	7	(Mexico) Mario Domínguez	Forsythe Racing	1:00.134	58.026	58.026
2	2	(Brazil) Bruno Junqueira	Newman/Haas Racing	59.617	58.918	58.918
3	3	(Canada) Paul Tracy	Forsythe Racing	1:00.032	58.426	58.426
4	10	(United States) A. J. Allmendinger	RuSPORT	1:00.047	58.572	58.572
5	1	(France) Sébastien Bourdais	Newman/Haas Racing	—^{*}	58.627	58.627
6	15	(Canada) Alex Tagliani	Team Australia	1:00.047	58.765	58.765
7	9	(United Kingdom) Justin Wilson	RuSPORT	1:00.149	58.829	58.829
8	6	(Spain) Oriol Servià	PKV Racing	1:00.268	59.062	59.062
9	4	(France) Nelson Philippe	CTE Racing-HVM	1:01.260	59.232	59.232
10	5	(Australia) Will Power	Team Australia	1:00.690	59.302	59.302
11	34	(Netherlands) Charles Zwolsman Jr.	Mi-Jack Conquest Racing	1:01.903	59.385	59.385
12	14	(United Kingdom) Dan Clarke	CTE Racing-HVM	—	59.550	59.550
13	27	(Canada) Andrew Ranger	Mi-Jack Conquest Racing	1:03.165	59.740	59.740
14	19	(Brazil) Cristiano da Matta	Dale Coyne Racing	1:01.612	1:00.195	1:00.195
15	20	(United Kingdom) Katherine Legge	PKV Racing	1:01.831	1:00.265	1:00.265
16	8	(Netherlands) Nicky Pastorelli	Rocketsports Racing	1:04.091	1:00.269	1:00.269
17	11	(Belgium) Jan Heylen	Dale Coyne Racing	—	1:00.839	1:00.839

^{*} The first round qualifying time for Sébastien Bourdais was disallowed after his car failed technical inspection.

== Race ==
Pos	No	Driver	Team	Laps	Time/Retired	Grid	Points
1	1	(France) Sébastien Bourdais	Newman/Haas Racing	96	1:59:57.021	5	33
2	3	(Canada) Paul Tracy	Forsythe Racing	96	+1.238 secs	3	27
3	7	(Mexico) Mario Domínguez	Forsythe Racing	96	+2.287 secs	1	27
4	4	(France) Nelson Philippe	CTE Racing-HVM	96	+3.667 secs	9	23
5	9	(United Kingdom) Justin Wilson	RuSPORT	96	+4.040 secs	2	21
6	27	(Canada) Andrew Ranger	Mi-Jack Conquest Racing	96	+5.351 secs	13	20
7	5	(Australia) Will Power	Team Australia	96	+5.986 secs	10	17
8	10	(United States) A. J. Allmendinger	RuSPORT	96	+7.689 secs	4	15
9	19	(Brazil) Cristiano da Matta	Dale Coyne Racing	95	+ 1 Lap	14	13
10	2	(Brazil) Bruno Junqueira	Newman/Haas Racing	93	+ 3 Laps	2	12
11	15	(Canada) Alex Tagliani	Team Australia	90	Contact	6	10
12	6	(Spain) Oriol Servià	PKV Racing	87	Contact	8	9
13	11	(Belgium) Jan Heylen	Dale Coyne Racing	82	+ 14 Laps	17	8
14	20	(United Kingdom) Katherine Legge	PKV Racing	81	+ 15 Laps	15	7
15	34	(Netherlands) Charles Zwolsman Jr.	Mi-Jack Conquest Racing	69	Contact	11	6
16	14	(United Kingdom) Dan Clarke	CTE Racing-HVM	33	Suspension	12	5
17	8	(Netherlands) Nicky Pastorelli	Rocketsports Racing	29	Brakes	16	4

== Championship standings after the race ==
Drivers' Championship standings

	Pos	Driver	Points
	1	(France) Sébastien Bourdais	68
2	2	(Mexico) Mario Domínguez	50
1	3	(United Kingdom) Justin Wilson	48
2	4	(Canada) Andrew Ranger	40
2	5	(Canada) Alex Tagliani	35

- Note: Only the top five positions are included.

Previous race: 2006 Toyota Grand Prix of Long Beach	Champ Car World Series; 2006 season	Next race: 2006 Tecate Grand Prix of Monterrey
Previous race: 2001 Grand Prix of Houston	2006 Grand Prix of Houston	Next race: 2007 Grand Prix of Houston
