= 2006 Tecate Grand Prix of Monterrey =

Third race of the 2006 Champ Car season

(Mexico) 2006 Tecate Grand Prix of Monterrey
Race details
- Race 3 of 14 in the 2006 Champ Car season
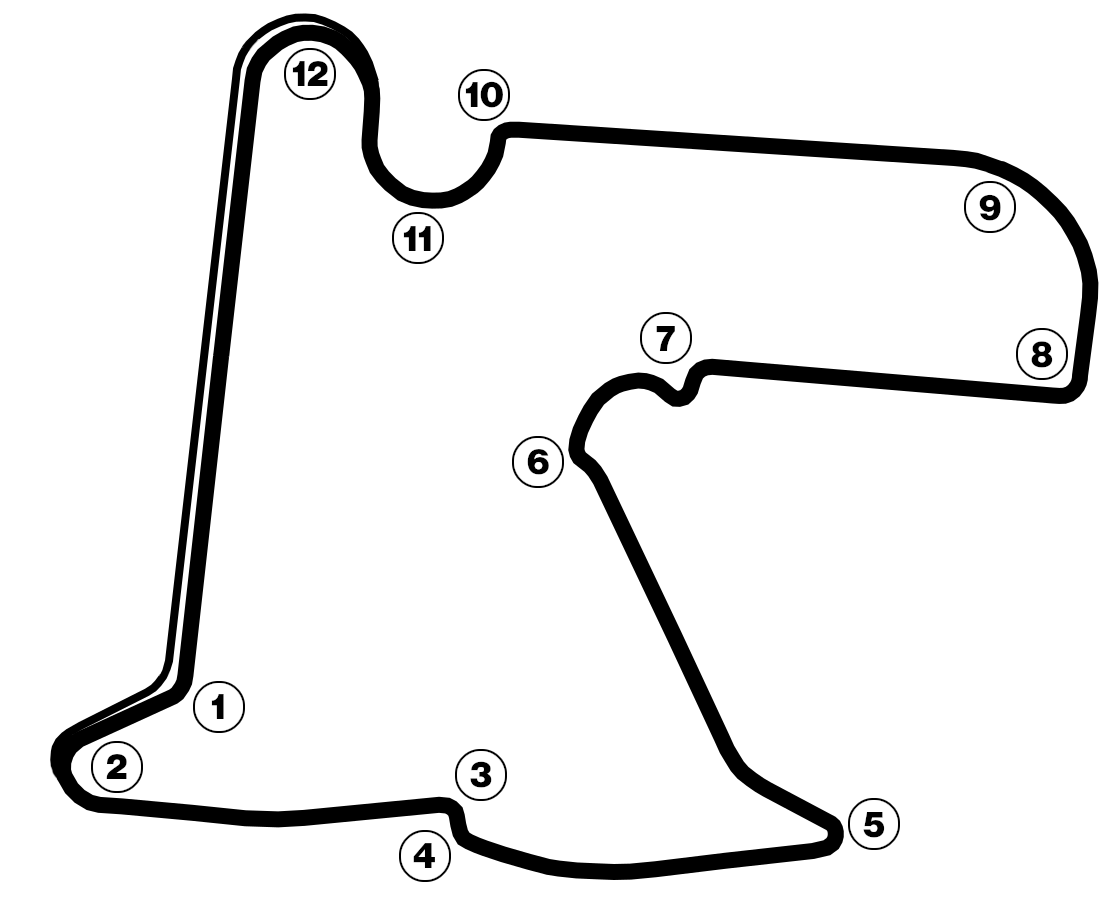
- Fundidora Park track layout
- Date: May 21, 2006
- Official name: Tecate Grand Prix of Monterrey presented by Roshfrans
- Location: Fundidora Park; Monterrey, Nuevo León, Mexico
- Course: Temporary street circuit 2.104 mi / 3.386 km
- Distance: 76 laps 159.904 mi / 257.336 km
- Weather: Hot and Sunny

Pole position
- Driver: (France) Sébastien Bourdais (Newman/Haas Racing)
- Time: 1:13.253

Fastest lap
- Driver: (France) Sébastien Bourdais (Newman/Haas Racing)
- Time: 1:14.529 (on lap 65 of 76)

Podium
- First: (France) Sébastien Bourdais (Newman/Haas Racing)
- Second: (United Kingdom) Justin Wilson (RuSPORT)
- Third: (United States) A. J. Allmendinger (RuSPORT)

The 2006 Tecate Grand Prix of Monterrey was the third round of the 2006 Bridgestone Presents the Champ Car World Series Powered by Ford season, held on May 21, 2006 on the Fundidora Park street circuit in Monterrey, Mexico. Sébastien Bourdais took the pole and the race victory, his third consecutive to open the season.

== Qualifying results ==
Pos	No.	Name	Team	Qual 1	Qual 2	Best
1	1	(France) Sébastien Bourdais	Newman/Haas Racing	1:14.658	1:13.253	1:13.253
2	9	(United Kingdom) Justin Wilson	RuSPORT	1:14.305	1:13.532	1:13.532
3	10	(United States) A. J. Allmendinger	RuSPORT	1:14.860	1:13.796	1:13.796
4	2	(Brazil) Bruno Junqueira	Newman/Haas Racing	1:15.162	1:13.911	1:13.911
5	3	(Canada) Paul Tracy	Forsythe Racing	1:15.144	1:14.009	1:14.009
6	15	(Canada) Alex Tagliani	Team Australia	1:15.571	1:14.534	1:14.534
7	6	(Spain) Oriol Servià	PKV Racing	1:15.731	1:14.553	1:14.553
8	7	(Mexico) Mario Domínguez	Forsythe Racing	1:16.424	1:14.692	1:14.692
9	5	(Australia) Will Power	Team Australia	1:17.180	1:14.884	1:14.884
10	34	(Netherlands) Charles Zwolsman Jr.	Mi-Jack Conquest Racing	1:15.842	1:15.162	1:15.162
11	11	(Belgium) Jan Heylen	Dale Coyne Racing	1:18.003	1:15.220	1:15.220
12	19	(Brazil) Cristiano da Matta	Dale Coyne Racing	1:16.359	1:15.253	1:15.253
13	27	(Canada) Andrew Ranger	Mi-Jack Conquest Racing	1:15.438	1:15.410	1:15.410
14	14	(United Kingdom) Dan Clarke	CTE Racing-HVM	1:18.520	1:15.484	1:15.484
15	4	(France) Nelson Philippe	CTE Racing-HVM	1:16.871	1:15.540	1:15.540
16	8	(Netherlands) Nicky Pastorelli	Rocketsports Racing	1:16.954	1:16.285	1:16.285
17	20	(United Kingdom) Katherine Legge	PKV Racing	1:18.159	1:16.351	1:16.351

== Race ==
Pos	No	Driver	Team	Laps	Time/Retired	Grid	Points
1	1	(France) Sébastien Bourdais	Newman/Haas Racing	76	1:39:50.252	1	34
2	9	(United Kingdom) Justin Wilson	RuSPORT	76	+3.066 secs	2	29
3	10	(United States) A. J. Allmendinger	RuSPORT	76	+14.132 secs	3	25
4	3	(Canada) Paul Tracy	Forsythe Racing	76	+47.222 secs	5	23
5	15	(Canada) Alex Tagliani	Team Australia	76	+57.778 secs	6	21
6	7	(Mexico) Mario Domínguez	Forsythe Racing	76	+58.782 secs	8	19
7	27	(Canada) Andrew Ranger	Mi-Jack Conquest Racing	76	+59.302 secs	13	18
8	6	(Spain) Oriol Servià	PKV Racing	76	+1:13.956	7	15
9	19	(Brazil) Cristiano da Matta	Dale Coyne Racing	76	+1:14.958	12	13
10	2	(Brazil) Bruno Junqueira	Newman/Haas Racing	75	+ 1 Lap	4	11
11	5	(Australia) Will Power	Team Australia	75	+ 1 Lap	9	10
12	34	(Netherlands) Charles Zwolsman Jr.	Mi-Jack Conquest Racing	75	+ 1 Lap	10	9
13	14	(United Kingdom) Dan Clarke	CTE Racing-HVM	75	+ 1 Lap	14	9
14	20	(United Kingdom) Katherine Legge	PKV Racing	75	+ 1 Lap	17	7
15	8	(Netherlands) Nicky Pastorelli	Rocketsports Racing	74	+ 2 Laps	16	6
16	11	(Belgium) Jan Heylen	Dale Coyne Racing	71	+ 5 Laps	11	5
17	4	(France) Nelson Philippe	CTE Racing-HVM	0	Contact	15	4

== Championship standings after the race ==
Drivers' Championship standings

	Pos	Driver	Points
	1	(France) Sébastien Bourdais	102
1	2	(United Kingdom) Justin Wilson	77
1	3	(Mexico) Mario Domínguez	69
	4	(Canada) Andrew Ranger	58
	5	(Canada) Alex Tagliani	56

- Note: Only the top five positions are included.

Previous race: 2006 Grand Prix of Houston	Champ Car World Series; 2006 season	Next race: 2006 Time Warner Cable Road Runner 225
Previous race: 2005 Tecate/Telmex Grand Prix of Monterrey	2006 Tecate Grand Prix of Monterrey	Next race: Final Event
