= 2006 West Edmonton Mall Grand Prix of Edmonton =

Coordinates: 53°34′32″N 113°31′22.5″W

(Canada) 2006 West Edmonton Mall Grand Prix of Edmonton
Race details
- Race 8 of 14 in the 2006 Champ Car season
- Date: July 23, 2006
- Official name: West Edmonton Mall Grand Prix Presented by The Brick
- Location: JAGFlo Speedway; Edmonton, Alberta, Canada
- Course: Temporary Airport Course; 1.973 mi / 3.175 km
- Distance: 85 laps 167.705 mi / 269.875 km
- Weather: Sunny with temperatures reaching up to 34.5 °C (94.1 °F); wind speeds remained calm throughout the event

Pole position
- Driver: (France) Sébastien Bourdais ( (United States) Newman/Haas Racing)
- Time: 58.560

Fastest lap
- Driver: (United Kingdom) Justin Wilson ( (United States) RuSPORT)
- Time: 59.200 (on lap 82 of 85)

Podium
- First: (United Kingdom) Justin Wilson ( (United Kingdom) RuSPORT)
- Second: (France) Sébastien Bourdais ( (France) Newman/Haas Racing)
- Third: (United States) A. J. Allmendinger ( (United States) Forsythe Championship Racing)

The 2006 West Edmonton Mall Grand Prix of Edmonton was the eighth round of the 2006 Bridgestone Presents the Champ Car World Series Powered by Ford season, held on July 23, 2006, at JAGFlo Speedway, a temporary track laid out at City Centre Airport in Edmonton, Alberta, Canada. Sébastien Bourdais took the pole but the race was won by Justin Wilson.

== Qualifying results ==
Pos	Nat	Name	Team	Qual 1	Qual 2	Best
1	(France)	Sébastien Bourdais	Newman/Haas Racing	59.895	58.560	58.560
2	(Canada)	Paul Tracy	Forsythe Racing	1:00.067	58.622	58.622
3	(United Kingdom)	Justin Wilson	RuSPORT	1:00.251	58.665	58.665
4	(United States)	A. J. Allmendinger	Forsythe Racing	1:03.971	58.893	58.893
5	(Spain)	Oriol Servià	PKV Racing	1:01.321	59.324	59.324
6	(France)	Nelson Philippe	CTE Racing-HVM	1:00.675	59.510	59.510
7	(Australia)	Will Power (R)	Team Australia	—	59.539	59.539
8	(Canada)	Andrew Ranger	Mi-Jack Conquest Racing	1:01.672	1:00.071	1:00.071
9	(Brazil)	Bruno Junqueira	Newman/Haas Racing	1:00.085	1:06.279	1:00.085
10	(Mexico)	Mario Domínguez	Dale Coyne Racing	1:01.647	1:00.106	1:00.106
11	(Canada)	Alex Tagliani	Team Australia	1:01.461	1:00.110	1:00.110
12	(Belgium)	Jan Heylen (R)	Dale Coyne Racing	1:01.603	1:00.199	1:00.199
13	(Netherlands)	Charles Zwolsman Jr. (R)	Mi-Jack Conquest Racing	1:01.393	1:00.291	1:00.291
14	(Brazil)	Cristiano da Matta	RuSPORT	1:00.412	1:00.305	1:00.305
15	(England)	Katherine Legge (R)	PKV Racing	1:01.417	1:00.358	1:00.358
16	(Netherlands)	Nicky Pastorelli (R)	Rocketsports Racing	1:01.760	1:00.978	1:00.978
17	(England)	Dan Clarke (R)	CTE Racing-HVM	1:01.215	—	1:01.215
18	(Estonia)	Tõnis Kasemets (R)	Rocketsports Racing	1:02.755	1:01.704	1:01.704

== Race ==
Pos	No	Driver	Team	Laps	Time/Retired	Grid	Points
1	9	(United Kingdom) Justin Wilson	RuSPORT	85	1:40:30.635	3	33
2	1	(France) Sébastien Bourdais	Newman/Haas Racing	85	+5.319 secs	1	30
3	7	(United States) A. J. Allmendinger	Forsythe Racing	85	+9.946 secs	4	25
4	6	(Spain) Oriol Servià	PKV Racing	85	+12.650 secs	5	23
5	3	(Canada) Paul Tracy	Forsythe Racing	85	+16.609 secs	2	22
6	5	(Australia) Will Power (R)	Team Australia	85	+27.803 secs	7	19
7	27	(Canada) Andrew Ranger	Mi-Jack Conquest Racing	84	+ 1 Lap	8	17
8	19	(Mexico) Mario Domínguez	Dale Coyne Racing	84	+ 1 Lap	10	15
9	14	(United Kingdom) Dan Clarke (R)	CTE Racing-HVM	84	+ 1 Lap	17	14
10	34	(Netherlands) Charles Zwolsman Jr. (R)	Mi-Jack Conquest Racing	82	+ 3 Laps	13	11
11	18	(Estonia) Tõnis Kasemets (R)	Rocketsports Racing	82	+ 3 Laps	18	10
12	15	(Canada) Alex Tagliani	Team Australia	78	Contact	11	9
13	20	(United Kingdom) Katherine Legge (R)	PKV Racing	73	+ 12 Laps	15	8
14	4	(France) Nelson Philippe	CTE Racing-HVM	69	Contact	6	7
15	2	(Brazil) Bruno Junqueira	Newman/Haas Racing	54	Gearbox	9	6
16	11	(Belgium) Jan Heylen (R)	Dale Coyne Racing	10	Contact	12	5
17	8	(Netherlands) Nicky Pastorelli (R)	Rocketsports Racing	4	Contact	16	4
18	10	(Brazil) Cristiano da Matta	RuSPORT	0	Contact	14	3

== Caution flags ==
Laps	Cause
1-3	Junqueira (2) & da Matta (10) crash
5-9	Pastorelli (8) crash; Heylen (11) crash
65-69	Tagliani (15) crash
70-72	Philippe (4) crash

== Notes ==
Laps	Leader
1-35	Sébastien Bourdais
36-37	Paul Tracy
38-53	Sébastien Bourdais
54-60	Justin Wilson
61-64	Sébastien Bourdais
65-85	Justin Wilson

Driver	Laps led
Sébastien Bourdais	55
Justin Wilson	28
Paul Tracy	2

- New Track Record Sébastien Bourdais 58.560 (Qualification Session #2)
- New Race Lap Record Justin Wilson 59.200
- New Race Record Justin Wilson 1:40:30.635
- Average Speed 100.112 mph

== Championship standings after the race ==
Drivers' Championship standings

	Pos	Driver	Points
	1	(France) Sébastien Bourdais	221
1	2	(United Kingdom) Justin Wilson	198
1	3	(United States) A. J. Allmendinger	193
2	4	(Canada) Paul Tracy	130
	5	(Canada) Andrew Ranger	127

- Note: Only the top five positions are included.

Previous race: 2006 Molson Grand Prix of Toronto	Champ Car World Series; 2006 season	Next race: 2006 Canary Foundation Grand Prix of San Jose
Previous race: 2005 West Edmonton Mall Grand Prix of Edmonton	2006 West Edmonton Mall Grand Prix of Edmonton	Next race: 2007 Rexall Grand Prix of Edmonton
