= 2006 Molson Grand Prix of Toronto =

(Canada) 2006 Toronto
Race details
- Race 7 of 14 in the 2006 Champ Car season
- Exhibition Place track layout
- Date: July 9, 2006
- Official name: Molson Grand Prix of Toronto
- Location: Exhibition Place; Toronto, Ontario, Canada
- Course: Temporary Street Course; 1.755 mi / 2.824 km
- Distance: 86 laps 150.930 mi / 242.864 km
- Weather: Temperatures reaching up to 28 °C (82 °F); dropping slightly to 22.3 °C (72.1 °F) by the end of the event

Pole position
- Driver: (United Kingdom) Justin Wilson (RuSPORT)
- Time: 58.182

Fastest lap
- Driver: (Canada) Alex Tagliani (Team Australia)
- Time: 1:00.461 (on lap 76 of 86)

Podium
- First: (United States) A. J. Allmendinger (Forsythe Championship Racing)
- Second: (Canada) Paul Tracy (Forsythe Championship Racing)
- Third: (France) Sébastien Bourdais (Newman/Haas Racing)

The 2006 Molson Grand Prix of Toronto was the seventh round of the 2006 Bridgestone Presents the Champ Car World Series Powered by Ford season, held on July 9, 2006 on the streets of Exhibition Place in Toronto, Ontario, Canada. Justin Wilson took the pole but A. J. Allmendinger took the win, his third consecutive race victory.

== Qualifying results ==
Pos	Nat	Name	Team	Qual 1	Qual 2	Best
1	(United Kingdom)	Justin Wilson	RuSPORT	58.830	58.182	58.182
2	(United States)	A. J. Allmendinger	Forsythe Racing	58.621	58.264	58.264
3	(France)	Sébastien Bourdais	Newman/Haas Racing	59.313	58.345	58.345
4	(Canada)	Paul Tracy	Forsythe Racing	59.274	58.576	58.576
5	(Spain)	Oriol Servià	PKV Racing	59.407	58.920	58.920
6	(Canada)	Andrew Ranger	Mi-Jack Conquest Racing	1:00.455	59.059	59.059
7	(France)	Nelson Philippe	CTE Racing-HVM	59.203	59.091	59.091
8	(Brazil)	Cristiano da Matta	RuSPORT	59.343	59.102	59.102
9	(Brazil)	Bruno Junqueira	Newman/Haas Racing	59.367	59.116	59.116
10	(Canada)	Alex Tagliani	Team Australia	59.626	59.120	59.120
11	(Mexico)	Mario Domínguez	Dale Coyne Racing	1:00.556	59.637	59.637
12	(Australia)	Will Power	Team Australia	1:00.588	59.687	59.687
13	(Belgium)	Jan Heylen	Dale Coyne Racing	1:00.792	1:00.132	1:00.132
14	(Netherlands)	Charles Zwolsman Jr.	Mi-Jack Conquest Racing	1:00.387	1:00.176	1:00.176
15	(United Kingdom)	Katherine Legge	PKV Racing	1:01.191	1:00.276	1:00.276
16	(United Kingdom)	Dan Clarke	CTE Racing-HVM	1:00.688	—	1:00.688
17	(Estonia)	Tõnis Kasemets	Rocketsports Racing	1:01.530	1:01.182	1:01.182

== Race ==
Pos	No	Driver	Team	Laps	Time/Retired	Grid	Points
1	7	(United States) A. J. Allmendinger	Forsythe Racing	86	1:38:01.286	2	33
2	3	(Canada) Paul Tracy	Forsythe Racing	86	+1.851 secs	4	27
3	1	(France) Sébastien Bourdais	Newman/Haas Racing	86	+2.434 secs	3	25
4	9	(United Kingdom) Justin Wilson	RuSPORT	86	+4.170 secs	1	25
5	10	(Brazil) Cristiano da Matta	RuSPORT	86	+6.761 secs	8	21
6	15	(Canada) Alex Tagliani	Team Australia	86	+8.383 secs	10	20
7	5	(Australia) Will Power	Team Australia	86	+9.663 secs	12	18
8	2	(Brazil) Bruno Junqueira	Newman/Haas Racing	86	+12.177 secs	9	15
9	34	(Netherlands) Charles Zwolsman Jr.	Mi-Jack Conquest Racing	85	+ 1 Lap	14	13
10	27	(Canada) Andrew Ranger	Mi-Jack Conquest Racing	85	+ 1 Lap	6	11
11	19	(Mexico) Mario Domínguez	Dale Coyne Racing	83	+ 3 Laps	11	10
12	6	(Spain) Oriol Servià	PKV Racing	76	Contact	5	10
13	4	(France) Nelson Philippe	CTE Racing-HVM	76	Contact	7	9
14	20	(United Kingdom) Katherine Legge	PKV Racing	65	Contact	15	7
15	18	(Estonia) Tõnis Kasemets	Rocketsports Racing	49	Half shaft	17	6
16	11	(Belgium) Jan Heylen	Dale Coyne Racing	44	Rear axle	13	5
17	14	(United Kingdom) Dan Clarke	CTE Racing-HVM	14	Contact	16	4

== Caution flags ==
Laps	Cause
9-12	Legge (20), Clarke (14), Kasemets (18) & Heylen (11) crash
16-18	Zwolsman (34) & Clarke (14) crash
77-82	Philippe (4) & Servià (6) crash

== Notes ==
Laps	Leader
1-10	Justin Wilson
11-34	Nelson Philippe
35-49	A. J. Allmendinger
50-53	Oriol Servià
54-63	Nelson Philippe
64-86	A. J. Allmendinger

Driver	Laps led
A. J. Allmendinger	38
Nelson Philippe	34
Justin Wilson	10
Oriol Servià	4

- New Race Record A. J. Allmendinger 1:38:01.286
- Average Speed 92.386 mph

== Championship standings after the race ==
Drivers' Championship standings

	Pos	Driver	Points
	1	(France) Sébastien Bourdais	191
1	2	(United States) A. J. Allmendinger	168
1	3	(United Kingdom) Justin Wilson	165
2	4	(Canada) Alex Tagliani	110
1	5	(Canada) Andrew Ranger	110

- Note: Only the top five positions are included.

Previous race: 2006 Grand Prix of Cleveland	Champ Car World Series; 2006 season	Next race: 2006 West Edmonton Mall Grand Prix of Edmonton
Previous race: 2005 Molson Indy Toronto	2006 Molson Grand Prix of Toronto	Next race: 2007 Steelback Grand Prix of Toronto
