= 2006 Grand Prix of Cleveland =

(United States) 2006 Cleveland
Race details
- Race 6 of 14 in the 2006 Champ Car season
- Date: June 25, 2006
- Official name: Grand Prix of Cleveland presented by U.S. Bank
- Location: Burke Lakefront Airport; Cleveland, Ohio, United States
- Course: Temporary Airport Course; 2.106 mi / 3.389 km
- Distance: 95 laps 200.070 mi / 321.955 km
- Weather: Temperatures reaching up to 73.9 °F (23.3 °C); wind speeds reaching up to 8.9 miles per hour (14.3 km/h)

Pole position
- Driver: (United States) A. J. Allmendinger (Forsythe Championship Racing)
- Time: 56.283

Fastest lap
- Driver: (France) Nelson Philippe (CTE Racing-HVM)
- Time: 57.508 (on lap 91 of 95)

Podium
- First: (United States) A. J. Allmendinger (Forsythe Championship Racing)
- Second: (Brazil) Bruno Junqueira (Newman/Haas Racing)
- Third: (Spain) Oriol Servià (PKV Racing)

Logo for the 2006 Grand Prix of Cleveland

The 2006 Grand Prix of Cleveland was the sixth round of the 2006 Bridgestone Presents the Champ Car World Series Powered by Ford season, held on June 25, 2006 at Burke Lakefront Airport in Cleveland, Ohio. It was the 25th anniversary edition of the event. A. J. Allmendinger took the pole and the win, his second consecutive victory.

== Qualifying results ==
Pos	Nat	Name	Team	Qual 1	Qual 2	Best
1	(United States)	A. J. Allmendinger	Forsythe Racing	56.965	56.283	56.283
2	(France)	Sébastien Bourdais	Newman/Haas Racing	56.851	56.638	56.638
3	(United Kingdom)	Justin Wilson	RuSPORT	57.312	56.651	56.651
4	(Spain)	Oriol Servià	PKV Racing	57.782	56.855	56.855
5	(Canada)	Paul Tracy	Forsythe Racing	57.011	57.604	57.011
6	(France)	Nelson Philippe	CTE Racing-HVM	57.779	57.162	57.162
7	(Brazil)	Bruno Junqueira	Newman/Haas Racing	57.564	57.178	57.178
8	(Canada)	Alex Tagliani	Team Australia	57.931	57.401	57.401
9	(Australia)	Will Power	Team Australia	58.115	57.538	57.538
10	(Brazil)	Cristiano da Matta	RuSPORT	58.499	57.570	57.570
11	(United Kingdom)	Dan Clarke	CTE Racing-HVM	59.372	57.619	57.619
12	(Canada)	Andrew Ranger	Mi-Jack Conquest Racing	58.585	57.772	57.772
13	(Netherlands)	Charles Zwolsman Jr.	Mi-Jack Conquest Racing	58.859	58.023	58.023
14	(United Kingdom)	Katherine Legge	PKV Racing	58.722	58.048	58.048
15	(Netherlands)	Nicky Pastorelli	Rocketsports Racing	59.410	58.179	58.179
16	(Belgium)	Jan Heylen	Dale Coyne Racing	58.532	58.261	58.261
17	(Mexico)	Mario Domínguez	Dale Coyne Racing	58.801	—	58.801
18	(Estonia)	Tõnis Kasemets	Rocketsports Racing	1:00.530	59.549	59.549

== Race ==
Pos	No	Driver	Team	Laps	Time/Retired	Grid	Points
1	7	(United States) A. J. Allmendinger	Forsythe Racing	95	2:00:22.619	1	33
2	2	(Brazil) Bruno Junqueira	Newman/Haas Racing	95	+3.279 secs	7	28
3	6	(Spain) Oriol Servià	PKV Racing	95	+3.505 secs	4	26
4	15	(Canada) Alex Tagliani	Team Australia	95	+6.708 secs	8	24
5	11	(Belgium) Jan Heylen	Dale Coyne Racing	95	+11.031 secs	16	22
6	19	(Mexico) Mario Domínguez	Dale Coyne Racing	94	Contact	17	19
7	14	(United Kingdom) Dan Clarke	CTE Racing-HVM	94	Contact	11	17
8	20	(United Kingdom) Katherine Legge	PKV Racing	94	+ 1 Lap	14	15
9	5	(Australia) Will Power	Team Australia	94	+ 1 Lap	9	13
10	4	(France) Nelson Philippe	CTE Racing-HVM	93	+ 2 Laps	6	13
11	27	(Canada) Andrew Ranger	Mi-Jack Conquest Racing	92	+ 3 Laps	12	10
12	18	(Estonia) Tõnis Kasemets	Rocketsports Racing	91	+ 4 Laps	18	9
13	9	(United Kingdom) Justin Wilson	RuSPORT	77	Contact	3	8
14	10	(Brazil) Cristiano da Matta	RuSPORT	75	+ 20 Laps	10	7
15	34	(Netherlands) Charles Zwolsman Jr.	Mi-Jack Conquest Racing	68	Steering	13	6
16	3	(Canada) Paul Tracy	Forsythe Racing	41	Contact	5	5
17	8	(Netherlands) Nicky Pastorelli	Rocketsports Racing	22	Contact	15	4
18	1	(France) Sébastien Bourdais	Newman/Haas Racing	0	Contact	2	4

== Caution flags ==
Laps	Cause
1-10	Bourdais (1), Tracy (3) & Ranger (27) crash
11-12	Zwolsman (34) spin, stall
23-26	Tracy (3) & Pastorelli (8) crash
38-40	Kasemets (18) spin, stall
43-47	Tracy (3) crash
48	Yellow restart
63-65	Ranger (27) spin, stall
66	Yellow restart
78-83	Wilson (9) crash; Philippe (4) off course

== Notes ==
Laps	Leader
1-23	Oriol Servià
24-26	Bruno Junqueira
27-38	A. J. Allmendinger
39-54	Alex Tagliani
55	Nelson Philippe
56-63	A. J. Allmendinger
64-71	Bruno Junqueira
72-77	Nelson Philippe
78-79	Alex Tagliani
80-95	A. J. Allmendinger

Driver	Laps led
A. J. Allmendinger	36
Oriol Servià	23
Alex Tagliani	18
Bruno Junqueira	11
Nelson Philippe	7

- New Track Record A. J. Allmendinger 56.283 (Qualification Session #2)
- New Race Lap Record Nelson Philippe 57.508
- New Race Record A. J. Allmendinger 2:00:22.619
- Average Speed 99.722 mph

== Championship standings after the race ==
Drivers' Championship standings

	Pos	Driver	Points
	1	(France) Sébastien Bourdais	166
	2	(United Kingdom) Justin Wilson	140
	3	(United States) A. J. Allmendinger	135
	4	(Canada) Andrew Ranger	99
1	5	(Mexico) Mario Domínguez	95

- Note: Only the top five positions are included.

Previous race: 2006 Grand Prix of Portland	Champ Car World Series; 2006 season	Next race: 2006 Molson Grand Prix of Toronto
Previous race: 2005 Grand Prix of Cleveland	2006 Grand Prix of Cleveland	Next race: 2007 Grand Prix of Cleveland
