= 2006 Champ Car Grand Prix de Montreal =

(Canada) 2006 Montreal
Race details
- Race 11 of 14 in the 2006 Champ Car season
- Circuit Gilles Villeneuve Track Layout
- Date: August 28, 2006
- Official name: Champ Car Grand Prix de Montreal
- Location: Circuit Gilles Villeneuve; Montreal, Quebec, Canada
- Course: Permanent Road Course; 2.709 mi / 4.360 km
- Distance: 67 laps 181.503 mi / 292.120 km
- Weather: Monsoonal Rain (Sunday)/Overcast (Monday)

Pole position
- Driver: (France) Sébastien Bourdais (Newman/Haas Racing)
- Time: 1:20.005

Fastest lap
- Driver: (France) Sébastien Bourdais (Newman/Haas Racing)
- Time: 1:22.325 (on lap 58 of 67)

Podium
- First: (France) Sébastien Bourdais (Newman/Haas Racing)
- Second: (Canada) Paul Tracy (Forsythe Championship Racing)
- Third: (France) Nelson Philippe (CTE Racing-HVM)

The 2006 Champ Car Grand Prix de Montreal was the eleventh round of the 2006 Bridgestone Presents the Champ Car World Series Powered by Ford season, held on August 27 and August 28, 2006 on the Circuit Gilles Villeneuve in Montreal, Quebec, Canada.

The race began on Sunday the 27th, but the race was red flagged due to excessive rain after only 6 laps were completed. The remainder of the race was rescheduled for 10:00am the following day, with all retired cars allowed to restart in the positions they held at the time of the red flag, albeit laps down if they were on the Sunday. The final 61 laps were completed without further weather stoppages. Sébastien Bourdais took the race win from the pole as well as a stranglehold on his third consecutive season championship with his closest competitors A. J. Allmendinger and Justin Wilson both finishing well back.

== Qualifying results ==
Pos	Nat	Name	Team	Qual 1	Qual 2	Best
1	(France)	Sébastien Bourdais	Newman/Haas Racing	1:21.193	1:20.005	1:20.005
2	(United States)	A. J. Allmendinger	Forsythe Racing	—	1:20.361	1:20.361
3	(United Kingdom)	Justin Wilson	RuSPORT	1:22.085	1:20.587	1:20.587
4	(Canada)	Paul Tracy	Forsythe Racing	1:22.222	1:20.669	1:20.669
5	(Spain)	Oriol Servià	PKV Racing	1:21.523	1:20.691	1:20.691
6	(Brazil)	Bruno Junqueira	Newman/Haas Racing	1:21.856	1:20.772	1:20.772
7	(Australia)	Will Power	Team Australia	1:22.796	1:21.156	1:21.156
8	(United Kingdom)	Dan Clarke	CTE Racing-HVM	1:22.800	1:21.555	1:21.555
9	(Canada)	Andrew Ranger	Mi-Jack Conquest Racing	1:22.655	1:21.561	1:21.561
10	(France)	Nelson Philippe	CTE Racing-HVM	1:22.513	1:21.725	1:21.725
11	(Netherlands)	Charles Zwolsman Jr.	Mi-Jack Conquest Racing	1:23.114	1:21.771	1:21.771
12	(Canada)	Alex Tagliani	Team Australia	1:22.803	1:21.916	1:21.916
13	(Brazil)	Antônio Pizzonia	Rocketsports Racing	1:22.767	1:22.050	1:22.050
14	(Belgium)	Jan Heylen	Dale Coyne Racing	1:22.999	1:22.096	1:22.096
15	(Mexico)	Mario Domínguez	Dale Coyne Racing	1:22.796	1:22.581	1:22.581
16	(United Kingdom)	Katherine Legge	PKV Racing	1:23.663	1:22.902	1:22.902
17	(Netherlands)	Nicky Pastorelli	Rocketsports Racing	1:24.204	1:25.338	1:24.204

== Race ==
The restart order on Monday was as follows:

Row	Inside		Outside	
1	7	(United States) A. J. Allmendinger	1	(France) Sébastien Bourdais
2	3	(Canada) Paul Tracy	9	(United Kingdom) Justin Wilson
3	2	(Brazil) Bruno Junqueira	6	(Spain) Oriol Servià
4	5	(Australia) Will Power	27	(Canada) Andrew Ranger
5	34	(Netherlands) Charles Zwolsman Jr.	14	(United Kingdom) Dan Clarke
6	15	(Canada) Alex Tagliani	18	(Brazil) Antônio Pizzonia
7	19	(Mexico) Mario Domínguez	4	(France) Nelson Philippe
8	8	(Netherlands) Nicky Pastorelli	11	(Belgium) Jan Heylen
9	20	(United Kingdom) Katherine Legge		

Pos	No	Driver	Team	Laps	Time/Retired	Grid	Points
1	1	(France) Sébastien Bourdais	Newman/Haas Racing	67	2:01:09.290	1	35
2	3	(Canada) Paul Tracy	Forsythe Racing	67	+1.398 secs	4	27
3	4	(France) Nelson Philippe	CTE Racing-HVM	67	+2.750 secs	10	26
4	14	(United Kingdom) Dan Clarke	CTE Racing-HVM	67	+3.120 secs	8	23
5	5	(Australia) Will Power	Team Australia	67	+6.359 secs	7	21
6	8	(Netherlands) Nicky Pastorelli	Rocketsports Racing	67	+7.432 secs	17	20
7	15	(Canada) Alex Tagliani	Team Australia	67	+8.321 secs	12	17
8	34	(Netherlands) Charles Zwolsman Jr.	Mi-Jack Conquest Racing	67	+8.410 secs	11	15
9	11	(Belgium) Jan Heylen	Dale Coyne Racing	67	+10.529 secs	14	13
10	19	(Mexico) Mario Domínguez	Dale Coyne Racing	67	+10.618 secs	15	11
11	18	(Brazil) Antônio Pizzonia	Rocketsports Racing	67	+11.266 secs	13	11
12	2	(Brazil) Bruno Junqueira	Newman/Haas Racing	66	+ 1 Lap	6	9
13	20	(United Kingdom) Katherine Legge	PKV Racing	61	+ 6 Laps	16	8
14	9	(United Kingdom) Justin Wilson	RuSPORT	48	Contact	3	8
15	27	(Canada) Andrew Ranger	Mi-Jack Conquest Racing	36	Contact	9	6
16	6	(Spain) Oriol Servià	PKV Racing	30	Contact	5	5
17	7	(United States) A. J. Allmendinger	Forsythe Racing	14	Driveshaft	2	5

== Caution flags ==
Laps	Cause
3-5	Legge (20) Crash
6	Rain (Red Flag)
7-9	Yellow Restart
11-13	Ranger (27) Spin/Stall
19-21	Legge (20) Spin/Stall
32-35	Servià (6) Crash
39-41	Ranger (27) Crash
49-53	Wilson (9) Crash
64-66	Debris

== Notes ==
Laps	Leader
1-13	A. J. Allmendinger
14-30	Sébastien Bourdais
31-33	Justin Wilson
34-49	Sébastien Bourdais
50-51	Antônio Pizzonia
52-62	Nelson Philippe
63-67	Sébastien Bourdais

Driver	Laps led
Sébastien Bourdais	38
A. J. Allmendinger	13
Nelson Philippe	11
Justin Wilson	3
Antônio Pizzonia	2

- New Race Record Sébastien Bourdais 2:01:09.290
- Average Speed 89.886 mph

== Championship standings after the race ==
Drivers' Championship standings

	Pos	Driver	Points
	1	(France) Sébastien Bourdais	310
1	2	(United Kingdom) Justin Wilson	248
1	3	(United States) A. J. Allmendinger	248
	4	(France) Nelson Philippe	175
1	5	(Canada) Paul Tracy	173

- Note: Only the top five positions are included.

Previous race: 2006 Grand Prix of Denver	Champ Car World Series; 2006 season	Next race: 2006 Grand Prix of Road America
Previous race: 2005 Molson Indy Montreal	2006 Champ Car Grand Prix de Montreal	Next race: Final Event; Event replaced with Champ Car Mont-Tremblant 07
