= Alex Sperafico =

Brazilian racing driver

Alexandre Sperafico (born January 21, 1974, in Toledo, Paraná) is a Brazilian racing driver. He is the oldest of the four racing Speraficos.

From 2000 to 2001, and for one start in 2003, Sperafico competed in the Barber Dodge Pro Series and won a race at Sebring on the weekend of the 2001 12 Hours of Sebring. In 2002, he was one of the three Speraficos in Formula 3000, joining Ricardo and Rodrigo. He raced for the Minardi Junior Team in nine events.

In 2003, Sperafico returned stateside and made his Champ Car World Series debut for Dale Coyne. In 2004, he ran half of the season for Mi-Jack Conquest Racing and a few races for CTE-HVM Racing in 2005. Unable to find a seat on the grid in 2006, Sperafico moved to the Brooks Associates Racing team in the ultra competitive Atlantic Series. After this, he retired from the competition.

== Motorsports career results ==
=== Complete International Formula 3000 results ===
(key) (Races in bold indicate pole position) (Races in italics indicate fastest lap)

Year	Entrant	1	2	3	4	5	6	7	8	9	10	11	12	DC	Points
2002	European Minardi F3000	INT; Ret	IMO; 15	CAT; 15	A1R; Ret	MON; Ret	NÜR; 11	SIL; Ret	MAG; Ret	HOC; Ret	HUN	SPA	MNZ	NC	0

=== Complete American Open-Wheel Racing results ===
(key)

==== Barber Dodge Pro Series ====
Year	1	2	3	4	5	6	7	8	9	10	11	12	Rank	Points
1999	SEB	NAZ	LRP	POR; 18	CLE; 24	ROA; 12	DET; 10	MOH; 12	GRA; 13	LS; 10	HMS; 20	WGI; 17	**20th**	**23**
2000	SEB; 5	MIA; 9	NAZ; 9	LRP; 5	DET; 23	CLE; 23	MOH; 18	ROA; 10	VAN; 7	LS; 4	RAT; 8	HMS; 3	**9th**	**85**
2001	**SEB**; 1	PIR; 13	LRP1; 11	LRP2; 3	DET; 3	CLE; 17	TOR; 15	CHI; 19	MOH; 21	ROA; 23	VAN	LS	**12th**	**58**
2003	STP; 7	MTY	MIL	LAG	POR	CLE	TOR	VAN	MOH	MTL			**24th**	**9**

==== CART/Champ Car World Series ====
Year	Team	No.	Chassis	Engine	1	2	3	4	5	6	7	8	9	10	11	12	13	14	15	16	17	18	19	Rank	Points	Ref
2003	Dale Coyne Racing	19	Lola B02/00	Ford XFE V8t	STP	MTY	LBH	BRH	LAU	MIL	LS	POR	CLE	TOR; 18	VAN	ROA	MOH	MTL	DEN	MIA; 14	MXC	SRF	FON	**26th**	**0**	
2004	Conquest Racing	14	Reynard 02i	Ford XFE V8t	LBH; 17	MTY; 16	MIL; 15	POR; 16	CLE; 13	TOR; 10	VAN; 17	ROA; 17	DEN	MTL	LS	LVS	SRF	MXC						**19th**	**47**^{^}	
2005	CTE-HVM Racing	55	Lola B02/00	Ford XFE V8t	LBH	MTY	MIL	POR	CLE	TOR; 8	EDM; 12	SJO	DEN	MTL	LVS	SRF	MXC							**20th**	**24**	

^{^} New points system implemented in 2004.

==== Atlantic Championship ====
Year	Team	1	2	3	4	5	6	7	8	9	10	11	12	Rank	Points
2006	Brooks Associates Racing	LBH	HOU	MTY	POR; 22	CLE1; 16	CLE2; 12	TOR; 11	EDM; 16	SJO; Ret	DEN; Ret	MTL; 19	ROA; 11	**22nd**	**41**
