= Rodolfo Lavín =

Mexican racing driver (born 1977)

Rodolfo Lavín Martínez (born July 30, 1977) is a Mexican racing driver from San Luis Potosí. He most notably raced in the Champ Car World Series.

In Mexico, Lavín raced in Formula Azteca and Formula 3. With funding in the form of sponsorship from Corona, with whom his father is on the board, Lavin raced in Indy Lights from 1996 to 2000 and Toyota Atlantics from 2001 to 2002. Lavín was not particularly successful in either series with no wins, but a best finish of 6th in Indy Lights and second in Toyota Atlantics. However, he did manage to start a record 58 races in Indy Lights.

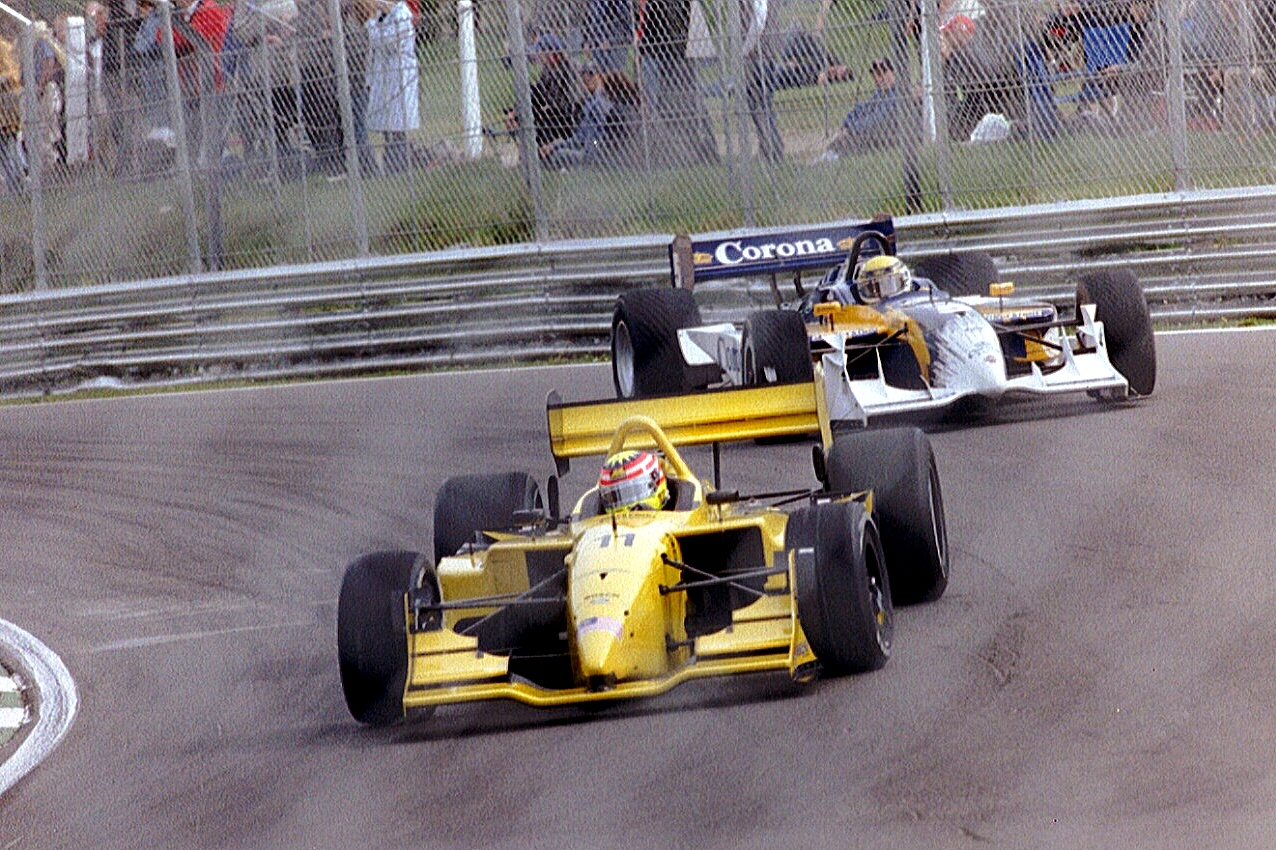
Lavín (second car, sponsored by Corona) racing at Brands Hatch at the 2003 London Champ Car Trophy.

Regardless, Lavín moved up to the Champ Car series in 2003, driving a disadvantaged Reynard chassis for Walker Racing. He had a mediocre rookie season, but managed to sign with Forsythe Championship Racing, a top Champ Car team, for the 2004 season. In 2004, Lavín notched one front row start and one podium; however, he was not a consistent front-runner, and was usually behind teammates Paul Tracy and Patrick Carpentier. Lavín found himself out of a ride at the start of the 2005 season, but he joined the HVM team halfway through the season with respectable results.

Lavín tried to get sponsorship from Corona for the 2007 Champ Car season but no deal was made.

Lavín is currently living in San Luis Potosí and he is one of the owners of the Santa Ursula Camp.

== Motorsports results ==
=== Complete American open–wheel racing results ===
(key)

==== Indy Lights ====
Year	Team	1	2	3	4	5	6	7	8	9	10	11	12	13	14	Rank	Points	Ref
1996	Leading Edge Motorsport	MIA; 16	LBH; 19	NAZ; DNQ	MIS; 14	MIL; 15	DET; 12	POR; 14	CLE; 15	TOR; 13	TRO; 18	VAN; 12	LS; 21			25th	2	
1997	Indy Regency Racing	MIA; 20	LBH; 16	NAZ; 21	SAV; 25	STL; 15	MIL; 22	DET; 19	POR; 19	TOR; 22	TRO; 22	VAN; 26	LS; 25	FON; 17		30th	0	
1998	Indy Regency Racing	MIA; 8	LBH; 18	NAZ; DNS	STL; 24	MIL; 13	DET; 18	POR; 17	CLE	TOR; 18	MIS; 17	TRO	VAN; 21	LS; 23	FON	27th	5	
1999	Brian Stewart Racing	MIA; 16	LBH; 9	NAZ; 9	MIL; 19	POR; 18	CLE; 15	TOR; 17	MIS; 8	DET; 11	CHI; 14	LS; 13	FON; 9			17th	19	
2000	Brian Stewart Racing	LBH; 7	MIL; 8	DET; 13	POR; 12	MIS; 16	CHI; 5	MDO; 17	VAN; 10	LS; 16	STL; 8	HOU; 6	FON; 5			11th	48	

==== Atlantic Championship ====
Year	Team	1	2	3	4	5	6	7	8	9	10	11	12	Rank	Points
2001	Michael Shank Racing	LBH; 7	NAZ; 3	MIL; Ret	MTL; Ret	CLE; 11	TOR; 8	CHI; 4	TRR; 7	ROA; 8	VAN; 5	HOU; Ret	LS; 6	7th	69
2002	Michael Shank Racing	MTY; 7	LBH; 11	MIL; 2	LS; 7	POR; 12	CHI; 9	TOR; 8	CLE; 11	TRR; 8	ROA; Ret	MTL; 11	DEN; Wth	9th	76

==== CART/Champ Car World Series ====
Year	Team	No.	Chassis	Engine	1	2	3	4	5	6	7	8	9	10	11	12	13	14	15	16	17	18	19	Rank	Points	Ref
2003	Walker Racing	5	Reynard 02i	Ford XFE V8 t	STP; 18	MTY; 15	LBH; 18	BRH; 15	LAU; 9	MIL; 14	LS; 19	POR; 11	CLE; 14	TOR; 15	VAN; 8	ROA; 19	MDO; 12	MTL; 15	DEN; 19	MIA; 18	MXC; 18	SRF; 8	FON; NH	18th	17	
2004	Forsythe Championship Racing	3	Lola B02/00	Ford XFE V8 t	LBH; 10	MTY; 13	MIL; 9	POR; 18	CLE; 9	TOR; 14	VAN; 15	ROA; 2	DEN; 11	MTL; 11	LS; 12	LVS; 4	SRF; 15	MXC; 13						14th	156^	
2005	CTE-HVM Racing	55	Lola B02/00	Ford XFE V8 t	LBH	MTY	MIL	POR	CLE	TOR	EDM	SJO; 13	DEN; 5	MTL; 14	LVS; 5	SRF; 13	MXC; 15							18th	72	

- ^ New points system introduced in 2004.
