= 2004 Molson Indy Toronto =

Coordinates: 43°38′14″N 79°24′56″W

(Canada) 2004 Toronto
Race details
- Race 6 of 14 in the 2004 Champ Car season
- Exhibition Place track layout
- Date: July 11, 2004
- Official name: Molson Indy Toronto
- Location: Exhibition Place; Toronto, Ontario, Canada
- Course: Temporary Street Course; 1.755 mi / 2.824 km
- Distance: 84 laps 147.420 mi / 240.576 km
- Weather: Partly cloudy with temperatures reaching up to 25 °C (77 °F); wind speeds approaching 8 kilometres per hour (5.0 mph)

Pole position
- Driver: (France) Sébastien Bourdais (Newman/Haas Racing)
- Time: 58.558

Fastest lap
- Driver: (France) Sébastien Bourdais (Newman/Haas Racing)
- Time: 1:00.304 (on lap 58 of 84)

Podium
- First: (France) Sébastien Bourdais (Newman/Haas Racing)
- Second: (United States) Jimmy Vasser (PKV Racing)
- Third: (Canada) Patrick Carpentier (Forsythe Championship Racing)

The 2004 Molson Indy Toronto was the sixth round of the 2004 Bridgestone Presents the Champ Car World Series Powered by Ford season, held on July 11, 2004 on the streets of Exhibition Place in Toronto, Ontario, Canada. Sébastien Bourdais swept the pole and the race win, his third consecutive win and fourth overall for the season. In doing so he also took over the lead in the drivers championship standings, a lead which he would not relinquish for the remainder of the season.

== Qualifying results ==
Pos	Nat	Name	Team	Qual 1	Qual 2	Best
1	(France)	Sébastien Bourdais	Newman/Haas Racing	59.410	58.558	58.558
2	(Canada)	Paul Tracy	Forsythe Racing	59.407	59.026	59.026
3	(Brazil)	Bruno Junqueira	Newman/Haas Racing	59.448	58.842	58.842
4	(Mexico)	Mario Domínguez	Herdez Competition	59.936	58.899	58.899
5	(United Kingdom)	Justin Wilson	Mi-Jack Conquest Racing	59.644	59.029	59.029
6	(Canada)	Patrick Carpentier	Forsythe Racing	1:00.069	59.200	59.200
7	(United States)	Ryan Hunter-Reay	Herdez Competition	59.759	59.260	59.260
8	(United States)	A. J. Allmendinger	RuSPORT	1:00.208	59.379	59.379
9	(Canada)	Alex Tagliani	Rocketsports Racing	59.754	59.469	59.469
10	(Spain)	Oriol Servià	Dale Coyne Racing	1:00.347	59.469	59.469
11	(United States)	Jimmy Vasser	PKV Racing	59.966	59.471	59.471
12	(Mexico)	Michel Jourdain Jr.	RuSPORT	59.701	59.584	59.584
13	(Mexico)	Rodolfo Lavín	Forsythe Racing	1:00.573	59.874	59.874
14	(Brazil)	Mario Haberfeld	Walker Racing	1:00.690	1:00.346	1:00.346
15	(Mexico)	Roberto González	PKV Racing	1:01.186	1:00.812	1:00.812
16	(Argentina)	Gastón Mazzacane	Dale Coyne Racing	1:02.391	1:01.130	1:01.130
17	(Brazil)	Alex Sperafico	Mi-Jack Conquest Racing	1:01.959	1:01.253	1:01.253
18	(United States)	Memo Gidley	Rocketsports Racing	—	1:01.497	1:01.497

== Race ==
Pos	No	Driver	Team	Laps	Time/Retired	Grid	Points
1	2	(France) Sébastien Bourdais	Newman/Haas Racing	84	1:45:36.930	1	34
2	12	(United States) Jimmy Vasser	PKV Racing	84	+1.396 secs	11	28
3	7	(Canada) Patrick Carpentier	Forsythe Racing	84	+6.731 secs	6	25
4	5	(Brazil) Mario Haberfeld	Walker Racing	84	+7.892 secs	14	24
5	1	(Canada) Paul Tracy	Forsythe Racing	84	+9.665 secs	2	23
6	19	(Argentina) Gastón Mazzacane	Dale Coyne Racing	84	+14.002 secs	16	19
7	8	(Canada) Alex Tagliani	Rocketsports Racing	84	+28.444 secs	9	17
8	4	(United States) Ryan Hunter-Reay	Herdez Competition	84	+43.175 secs	7	15
9	11	(Spain) Oriol Servià	Dale Coyne Racing	83	+ 1 Lap	10	13
10	14	(Brazil) Alex Sperafico	Mi-Jack Conquest Racing	83	+ 1 Lap	17	11
11	10	(United States) A. J. Allmendinger	RuSPORT	82	+ 2 Laps	8	10
12	34	(United Kingdom) Justin Wilson	Mi-Jack Conquest Racing	81	+ 3 Laps	5	9
13	21	(Mexico) Roberto González	PKV Racing	80	Contact	15	8
14	3	(Mexico) Rodolfo Lavín	Forsythe Racing	78	Stalled	13	7
15	9	(Mexico) Michel Jourdain Jr.	RuSPORT	73	Contact	12	6
16	17	(United States) Memo Gidley	Rocketsports Racing	36	Contact	18	5
17	55	(Mexico) Mario Domínguez	Herdez Competition	0	Contact	4	4
18	6	(Brazil) Bruno Junqueira	Newman/Haas Racing	0	Contact	3	3

== Caution flags ==
Laps	Cause
1-6	Junqueira (6), Domínguez (55) & Allmendinger (10) contact
22-24	Gidley (17) spin/stall
38-41	Gidley (17) contact
42-45	Servià (11) & Wilson (34) contact
47-48	Debris
74-79	Jourdain (9) contact
81-82	Lavín (3) stall on course

== Notes ==
Laps	Leader
1-63	Sébastien Bourdais
64-68	Jimmy Vasser
69-72	Paul Tracy
73-84	Sébastien Bourdais

Driver	Laps led
Sébastien Bourdais	75
Jimmy Vasser	5
Paul Tracy	4

- New Race Record Sébastien Bourdais 1:45:36.930
- Average Speed 83.749 mph

== Championship standings after the race ==
Drivers' Championship standings

	Pos	Driver	Points
1	1	(France) Sébastien Bourdais	164
1	2	(Brazil) Bruno Junqueira	136
	3	(Canada) Patrick Carpentier	129
1	4	(Canada) Paul Tracy	108
1	5	(Canada) Alex Tagliani	103

- Note: Only the top five positions are included.

Previous race: 2004 U.S. Bank Champ Car Grand Prix of Cleveland	Champ Car World Series; 2004 season	Next race: 2004 Molson Indy Vancouver
Previous race: 2003 Molson Indy Toronto	2004 Molson Indy Toronto	Next race: 2005 Molson Indy Toronto
