= 2004 Champ Car Grand Prix of Portland =

Coordinates: 45°35′49″N 122°41′45″W

(United States) 2004 Portland
Race details
- Race 4 of 14 in the 2004 Champ Car season
- Portland International Raceway Track Layout
- Date: June 20, 2004
- Official name: 2004 Champ Car Grand Prix of Portland
- Location: Portland International Raceway; Portland, Oregon, United States
- Course: Permanent Road Course; 1.969 mi / 3.169 km
- Distance: 94 laps 185.086 mi / 297.886 km
- Weather: Sunny with temperatures reaching up to 90 °F (32 °C); wind speeds approaching 15 miles per hour (24 km/h)

Pole position
- Driver: (France) Sébastien Bourdais (Newman/Haas Racing)
- Time: 59.229

Fastest lap
- Driver: (Brazil) Bruno Junqueira (Newman/Haas Racing)
- Time: 1:00.573 (on lap 92 of 94)

Podium
- First: (France) Sébastien Bourdais (Newman/Haas Racing)
- Second: (Brazil) Bruno Junqueira (Newman/Haas Racing)
- Third: (Canada) Paul Tracy (Forsythe Championship Racing)

The 2004 Champ Car Grand Prix of Portland was the fourth round of the 2004 Bridgestone Presents the Champ Car World Series Powered by Ford season, held on June 20, 2004 at Portland International Raceway in Portland, Oregon. Sébastien Bourdais took the pole and race win.

== Qualifying results ==
Pos	Nat	Name	Team	Qual 1	Qual 2	Best
1	(France)	Sébastien Bourdais	Newman/Haas Racing	59.718	59.229	59.229
2	(Brazil)	Bruno Junqueira	Newman/Haas Racing	59.266	1:00.067	59.266
3	(Canada)	Paul Tracy	Forsythe Racing	59.791	59.314	59.314
4	(United Kingdom)	Justin Wilson	Mi-Jack Conquest Racing	1:00.344	59.414	59.414
5	(United States)	A. J. Allmendinger	RuSPORT	59.803	59.654	59.654
6	(Mexico)	Mario Domínguez	Herdez Competition	1:00.097	59.757	59.757
7	(Canada)	Alex Tagliani	Rocketsports Racing	59.900	1:00.342	59.900
8	(Mexico)	Michel Jourdain Jr.	RuSPORT	1:00.205	59.900	59.900
9	(United States)	Jimmy Vasser	PKV Racing	1:00.439	59.922	59.922
10	(United States)	Ryan Hunter-Reay	Herdez Competition	1:00.088	59.926	59.926
11	(Mexico)	Roberto González	PKV Racing	1:00.081	59.987	59.987
12	(Mexico)	Rodolfo Lavín	Forsythe Racing	1:00.530	1:00.099	1:00.099
13	(Canada)	Patrick Carpentier	Forsythe Racing	1:00.182	−	1:00.182
14	(Spain)	Oriol Servià	Dale Coyne Racing	1:04.785	1:00.206	1:00.206
15	(Brazil)	Mario Haberfeld	Walker Racing	1:00.971	1:00.678	1:00.678
16	(Argentina)	Gastón Mazzacane	Dale Coyne Racing	1:00.833	1:01.410	1:00.833
17	(Brazil)	Alex Sperafico	Mi-Jack Conquest Racing	1:01.333	1:01.442	1:01.333
18	(France)	Nelson Philippe	Rocketsports Racing	1:01.531	1:02.060	1:01.531

== Race ==
Pos	No	Driver	Team	Laps	Time/Retired	Grid	Points
1	2	(France) Sébastien Bourdais	Newman/Haas Racing	94	1:45:50.461	1	33
2	6	(Brazil) Bruno Junqueira	Newman/Haas Racing	94	+1.247 secs	2	29
3	1	(Canada) Paul Tracy	Forsythe Racing	94	+40.066 secs	3	26
4	7	(Canada) Patrick Carpentier	Forsythe Racing	94	+52.356 secs	13	24
5	34	(United Kingdom) Justin Wilson	Mi-Jack Conquest Racing	94	+58.429 secs	4	21
6	10	(United States) A. J. Allmendinger	RuSPORT	94	+59.337 secs	5	19
7	8	(Canada) Alex Tagliani	Rocketsports Racing	93	+ 1 Lap	7	17
8	12	(United States) Jimmy Vasser	PKV Racing	93	+ 1 Lap	9	15
9	5	(Brazil) Mario Haberfeld	Walker Racing	93	+ 1 Lap	15	13
10	21	(Mexico) Roberto González	PKV Racing	93	+ 1 Lap	11	11
11	11	(Spain) Oriol Servià	Dale Coyne Racing	92	+ 2 Laps	14	10
12	4	(United States) Ryan Hunter-Reay	Herdez Competition	92	+ 2 Laps	10	9
13	19	(Argentina) Gastón Mazzacane	Dale Coyne Racing	92	+ 2 Laps	16	8
14	9	(Mexico) Michel Jourdain Jr.	RuSPORT	92	+ 2 Laps	8	7
15	17	(France) Nelson Philippe	Rocketsports Racing	91	+ 3 Laps	18	6
16	14	(Brazil) Alex Sperafico	Mi-Jack Conquest Racing	90	+ 4 Laps	17	5
17	55	(Mexico) Mario Domínguez	Herdez Competition	2	Contact	6	4
18	3	(Mexico) Rodolfo Lavín	Forsythe Racing	2	Contact	12	3

== Caution flags ==
Laps	Cause
1-3	Jourdain (9) spin/stall
4-8	Domínguez (55) & Lavín (3) contact

== Notes ==
Laps	Leader
1-29	Sébastien Bourdais
30-32	Paul Tracy
33-56	Sébastien Bourdais
57-62	Paul Tracy
63-94	Sébastien Bourdais

Driver	Laps led
Sébastien Bourdais	85
Paul Tracy	9

- New Race Record Sébastien Bourdais 1:45:50.461
- Average Speed 104.923 mph

== Championship standings after the race ==
Drivers' Championship standings

	Pos	Driver	Points
	1	(Brazil) Bruno Junqueira	105
	2	(Canada) Patrick Carpentier	99
1	3	(France) Sébastien Bourdais	98
2	4	(Canada) Paul Tracy	79
2	5	(United States) Ryan Hunter-Reay	75

- Note: Only the top five positions are included.

Previous race: 2004 Time Warner Cable Road Runner 250	Champ Car World Series; 2004 season	Next race: 2004 U.S. Bank Champ Car Grand Prix of Cleveland
Previous race: 2003 G.I. Joe's 200	2004 Champ Car Grand Prix of Portland	Next race: 2005 G.I. Joe's Champ Car Grand Prix of Portland
