= 2004 Time Warner Cable Road Runner 250 =

Coordinates: 43.02°N 88.01°W

(United States) 2004 Milwaukee
Race details
- Race 3 of 14 in the 2004 Champ Car season
- Milwaukee Mile Track Layout
- Date: June 5, 2004
- Official name: Time Warner Cable Road Runner 250
- Location: Milwaukee Mile, West Allis, Wisconsin, United States
- Course: 1 Mile Oval; 1.000 mi / 1.609 km
- Distance: 250 laps 250 mi / 402.336 km
- Weather: Cool and cloudy with temperatures dropping to 53.6 °F (12.0 °C); wind speeds up to 9.9 miles per hour (15.9 km/h)

Pole position
- Driver: (United States) Ryan Hunter-Reay (Herdez Competition)
- Time: 20.509

Fastest lap
- Driver: (United States) Ryan Hunter-Reay (Herdez Competition)
- Time: 21.765 (on lap 8 of 250)

Podium
- First: (United States) Ryan Hunter-Reay (Herdez Competition)
- Second: (Canada) Patrick Carpentier (Forsythe Championship Racing)
- Third: (Mexico) Michel Jourdain Jr. (RuSPORT)

Chronology
Previous	Next
2003	2005

The 2004 Time Warner Cable Road Runner 250 was the third round of the 2004 Bridgestone Presents the Champ Car World Series Powered by Ford season, held on June 5, 2004, at the Milwaukee Mile in West Allis, Wisconsin. The relatively cold temperatures for the night race limited passing, allowing Ryan Hunter-Reay to lead every lap of the race from the pole.

== Qualifying results ==
Pos	Nat	Name	Team	Best Lap	Time
1	(United States)	Ryan Hunter-Reay	Herdez Competition	2	20.509
2	(France)	Sébastien Bourdais	Newman/Haas Racing	2	20.667
3	(Canada)	Patrick Carpentier	Forsythe Racing	2	20.740
4	(Mexico)	Mario Domínguez	Herdez Competition	2	20.785
5	(Canada)	Paul Tracy	Forsythe Racing	2	20.800
6	(Mexico)	Rodolfo Lavín	Forsythe Racing	2	20.809
7	(Canada)	Alex Tagliani	Rocketsports Racing	2	20.815
8	(United States)	Jimmy Vasser	PKV Racing	2	20.854
9	(Mexico)	Michel Jourdain Jr.	RuSPORT	2	20.862
10	(Brazil)	Bruno Junqueira	Newman/Haas Racing	2	20.867
11	(Spain)	Oriol Servià	Dale Coyne Racing	2	20.916
12	(United Kingdom)	Justin Wilson	Mi-Jack Conquest Racing	2	21.184
13	(United States)	A. J. Allmendinger	RuSPORT	2	21.352
14	(Mexico)	Roberto González	PKV Racing	2	21.483
15	(Brazil)	Mario Haberfeld	Walker Racing	2	21.568
16	(Argentina)	Gastón Mazzacane	Dale Coyne Racing	2	21.907
17	(France)	Nelson Philippe	Rocketsports Racing	1	21.955
18	(Brazil)	Alex Sperafico	Mi-Jack Conquest Racing	2	22.388

== Race ==
Pos	No	Driver	Team	Laps	Time/Retired	Grid	Points
1	4	(United States) Ryan Hunter-Reay	Herdez Competition	250	1:59:12.397	1	34
2	7	(Canada) Patrick Carpentier	Forsythe Racing	250	+5.865 secs	3	27
3	9	(Mexico) Michel Jourdain Jr.	RuSPORT	250	+11.349 secs	9	25
4	12	(United States) Jimmy Vasser	PKV Racing	249	+ 1 Lap	8	23
5	10	(United States) A. J. Allmendinger	RuSPORT	249	+ 1 Lap	13	22
6	6	(Brazil) Bruno Junqueira	Newman/Haas Racing	248	+ 2 Laps	10	19
7	11	(Spain) Oriol Servià	Dale Coyne Racing	247	+ 3 Laps	11	17
8	55	(Mexico) Mario Domínguez	Herdez Competition	246	+ 4 Laps	4	15
9	3	(Mexico) Rodolfo Lavín	Forsythe Racing	245	Contact	6	13
10	5	(Brazil) Mario Haberfeld	Walker Racing	245	+ 5 Laps	15	11
11	34	(United Kingdom) Justin Wilson	Mi-Jack Conquest Racing	244	+ 6 Laps	12	10
12	21	(Mexico) Roberto González	PKV Racing	243	Fire	14	9
13	8	(Canada) Alex Tagliani	Rocketsports Racing	243	+ 7 Laps	7	8
14	17	(France) Nelson Philippe	Rocketsports Racing	240	+ 10 Laps	17	7
15	14	(Brazil) Alex Sperafico	Mi-Jack Conquest Racing	240	+ 10 Laps	18	6
16	19	(Argentina) Gastón Mazzacane	Dale Coyne Racing	79	Contact	16	5
17	1	(Canada) Paul Tracy	Forsythe Racing	60	Contact	5	4
18	2	(France) Sébastien Bourdais	Newman/Haas Racing	50	Contact	2	3

== Caution flags ==
Laps	Cause
1-4	Wilson (34) contact
51-59	Bourdais (2) contact
60-63	Tracy (1) contact
83-99	Mazzacane (19) contact
188-201	Debris
216-221	Debris
249-250	Lavín (3) contact

== Notes ==
Laps / Leader; 1-250 / Ryan Hunter-Reay	Driver / Laps led; Ryan Hunter-Reay / 250

- New Race Record Ryan Hunter-Reay 1:59:12.397
- Average Speed 129.859 mph

== Championship standings after the race ==
Drivers' Championship standings

	Pos	Driver	Points
1	1	(Brazil) Bruno Junqueira	76
2	2	(Canada) Patrick Carpentier	75
5	3	(United States) Ryan Hunter-Reay	66
3	4	(France) Sébastien Bourdais	65
	5	(Mexico) Mario Domínguez	62

- Note: Only the top five positions are included.

Previous race: 2004 Tecate/Telmex Grand Prix of Monterrey	Champ Car World Series; 2004 season	Next race: 2004 Champ Car Grand Prix of Portland
Previous race: 2003 Milwaukee Mile Centennial 250	Milwaukee Mile	Next race: 2005 Time Warner Cable Road Runner 225
