= 2004 Tecate/Telmex Grand Prix of Monterrey =

Coordinates: 25°40′41″N 100°17′00″W

(Mexico) 2004 Monterrey
Race details
- Race 2 of 14 in the 2004 Champ Car season
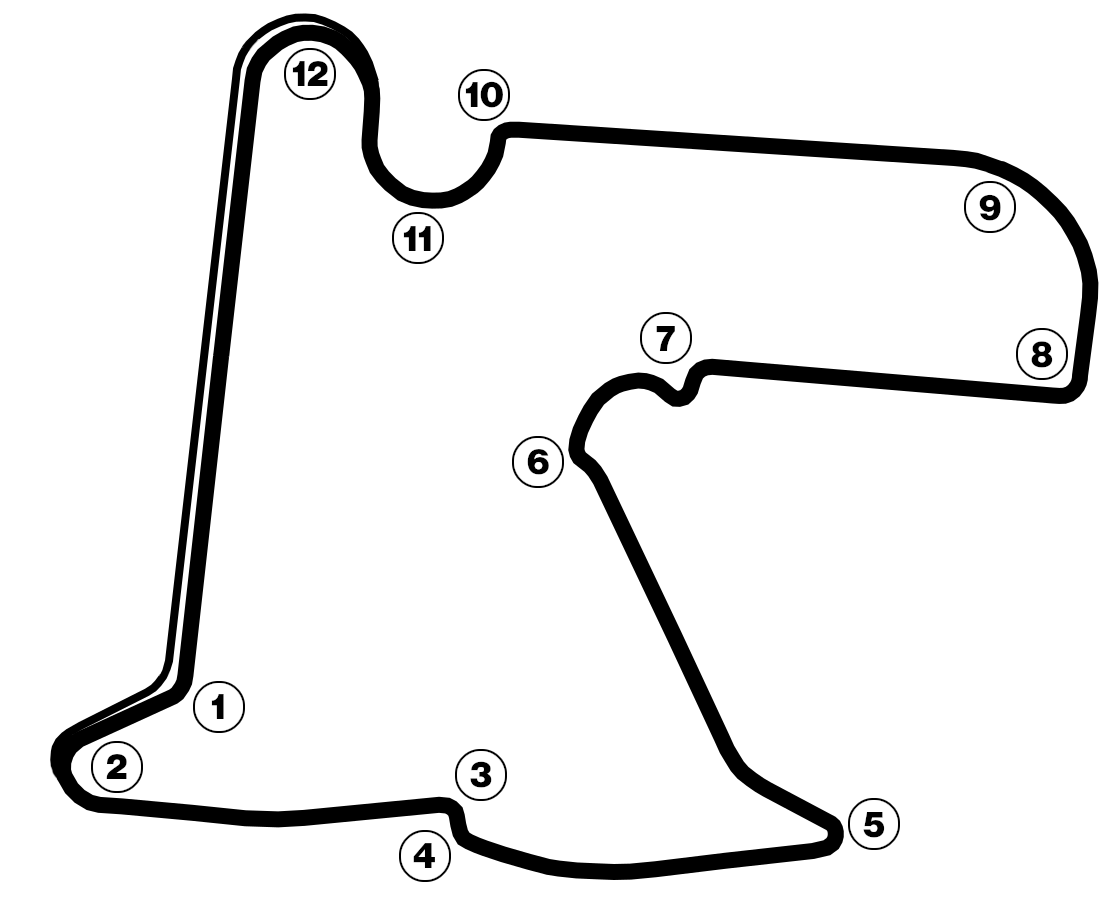
- Fundidora Park track layout
- Date: May 23, 2004
- Official name: Tecate Telmex Monterrey Grand Prix
- Location: Fundidora Park; Monterrey, Nuevo León, Mexico
- Course: Temporary street circuit 2.104 mi / 3.386 km
- Distance: 72 laps 151.488 mi / 243.792 km
- Weather: Warm and Hazy

Pole position
- Driver: (France) Sébastien Bourdais (Newman/Haas Racing)
- Time: 1:13.915

Fastest lap
- Driver: (France) Sébastien Bourdais (Newman/Haas Racing)
- Time: 1:15.021 (on lap 57 of 72)

Podium
- First: (France) Sébastien Bourdais (Newman/Haas Racing)
- Second: (Brazil) Bruno Junqueira (Newman/Haas Racing)
- Third: (Mexico) Mario Domínguez (Herdez Competition)

The 2004 Tecate/Telmex Grand Prix of Monterrey was the second round of the 2004 Bridgestone Presents the Champ Car World Series Powered by Ford season, held on May 23, 2004, on the streets of Fundidora Park in Monterrey, Mexico. Sébastien Bourdais swept pole position and the race win, his first pole and win of the season.

== Qualifying results ==
Pos	Nat	Name	Team	Qual 1	Qual 2	Best
1	(France)	Sébastien Bourdais	Newman/Haas Racing	1:15.978	1:13.915	1:13.915
2	(Mexico)	Mario Domínguez	Herdez Competition	1:16.422	1:14.343	1:14.343
3	(United Kingdom)	Justin Wilson	Mi-Jack Conquest Racing	1:16.087	1:14.354	1:14.354
4	(Brazil)	Bruno Junqueira	Newman/Haas Racing	1:15.834	1:14.405	1:14.405
5	(Canada)	Patrick Carpentier	Forsythe Racing	1:16.617	1:14.625	1:14.625
6	(Canada)	Paul Tracy	Forsythe Racing	1:16.417	1:14.723	1:14.723
7	(United States)	Jimmy Vasser	PKV Racing	1:16.620	1:15.183	1:15.183
8	(United States)	Ryan Hunter-Reay	Herdez Competition	1:17.637	1:15.265	1:15.265
9	(Spain)	Oriol Servià	Dale Coyne Racing	1:17.890	1:15.395	1:15.395
10	(Brazil)	Tarso Marques	Dale Coyne Racing	1:18.100	1:15.582	1:15.582
11	(United States)	A. J. Allmendinger	RuSPORT	1:17.644	1:15.673	1:15.673
12	(Mexico)	Roberto González	PKV Racing	1:18.154	1:15.791	1:15.791
13	(Mexico)	Michel Jourdain Jr.	RuSPORT	1:17.873	1:15.805	1:15.805
14	(Mexico)	Rodolfo Lavín	Forsythe Racing	1:18.553	1:16.096	1:16.096
15	(Canada)	Alex Tagliani	Rocketsports Racing	1:16.712	1:16.103	1:16.103
16	(Brazil)	Mario Haberfeld	Walker Racing	1:16.491	1:16.691	1:16.491
17	(France)	Nelson Philippe	Rocketsports Racing	1:18.373	1:17.191	1:17.191
18	(Brazil)	Alex Sperafico	Mi-Jack Conquest Racing	1:20.139	1:17.736	1:17.736

== Race ==
Pos	No	Driver	Team	Laps	Time/Retired	Grid	Points
1	2	(France) Sébastien Bourdais	Newman/Haas Racing	72	1:45:01.498	1	35
2	6	(Brazil) Bruno Junqueira	Newman/Haas Racing	72	+3.852 secs	4	28
3	55	(Mexico) Mario Domínguez	Herdez Competition	72	+5.209 secs	2	26
4	7	(Canada) Patrick Carpentier	Forsythe Racing	72	+6.119 secs	5	24
5	8	(Canada) Alex Tagliani	Rocketsports Racing	72	+9.900 secs	15	23
6	34	(United Kingdom) Justin Wilson	Mi-Jack Conquest Racing	72	+11.368 secs	3	20
7	1	(Canada) Paul Tracy	Forsythe Racing	72	+17.047 secs	6	17
8	4	(United States) Ryan Hunter-Reay	Herdez Competition	72	+22.251 secs	8	15
9	21	(Mexico) Roberto González	PKV Racing	72	+26.764 secs	12	13
10	17	(France) Nelson Philippe	Rocketsports Racing	72	+27.925 secs	17	11
11	9	(Mexico) Michel Jourdain Jr.	RuSPORT	72	+29.197 secs	13	10
12	12	(United States) Jimmy Vasser	PKV Racing	71	Contact	7	9
13	3	(Mexico) Rodolfo Lavín	Forsythe Racing	70	+ 2 Laps	14	8
14	11	(Spain) Oriol Servià	Dale Coyne Racing	70	+ 2 Laps	9	7
15	5	(Brazil) Mario Haberfeld	Walker Racing	62	Contact	16	6
16	14	(Brazil) Alex Sperafico	Mi-Jack Conquest Racing	46	Pit Incident	18	5
17	10	(United States) A. J. Allmendinger	RuSPORT	24	Fire	11	4
18	19	(Brazil) Tarso Marques	Dale Coyne Racing	11	Suspension	10	3

== Caution flags ==
Laps	Cause
2-3	Domínguez (55) spin/stall
6-7	Philippe (17) spin/stall
12-15	Marques (19) spin/stall
21-23	Philippe (17) & González (21) spin; Philippe (17) stall
41-44	Servià (11) contact
63-64	Haberfeld (5) & Lavín (3) contact; Lavín (3) stalled

== Notes ==
Laps	Leader
1-25	Sébastien Bourdais
26	Bruno Junqueira
27-30	Alex Tagliani
31-46	Patrick Carpentier
47	Mario Domínguez
48-51	Bruno Junqueira
52	Sébastien Bourdais
53-54	Alex Tagliani
55	Justin Wilson
56-72	Sébastien Bourdais

Driver	Laps led
Sébastien Bourdais	43
Patrick Carpentier	16
Alex Tagliani	6
Bruno Junqueira	5
Justin Wilson	1
Mario Domínguez	1

- New Track Record Sébastien Bourdais 1:13.915 (Qualification Session #2)
- New Race Lap Record Sébastien Bourdais 1:15.021
- New Race Record Sébastien Bourdais 1:45:01.498
- Average Speed 86.544 mph

== Championship standings after the race ==
Drivers' Championship standings

	Pos	Driver	Points
2	1	(France) Sébastien Bourdais	62
	2	(Brazil) Bruno Junqueira	57
2	3	(Canada) Paul Tracy	49
	4	(Canada) Patrick Carpentier	48
	5	(Mexico) Mario Domínguez	47

- Note: Only the top five positions are included.

Previous race: 2004 Toyota Grand Prix of Long Beach	Champ Car World Series; 2004 season	Next race: 2004 Time Warner Cable Road Runner 250
Previous race: 2003 Tecate Telmex Monterrey Grand Prix	2004 Tecate/Telmex Grand Prix of Monterrey	Next race: 2005 Tecate/Telmex Grand Prix of Monterrey
