= 2004 Molson Indy Vancouver =

Coordinates: 49°16′34″N 123°6′24″W

(Canada) 2004 Vancouver
Race details
- Race 7 of 14 in the 2004 Champ Car season
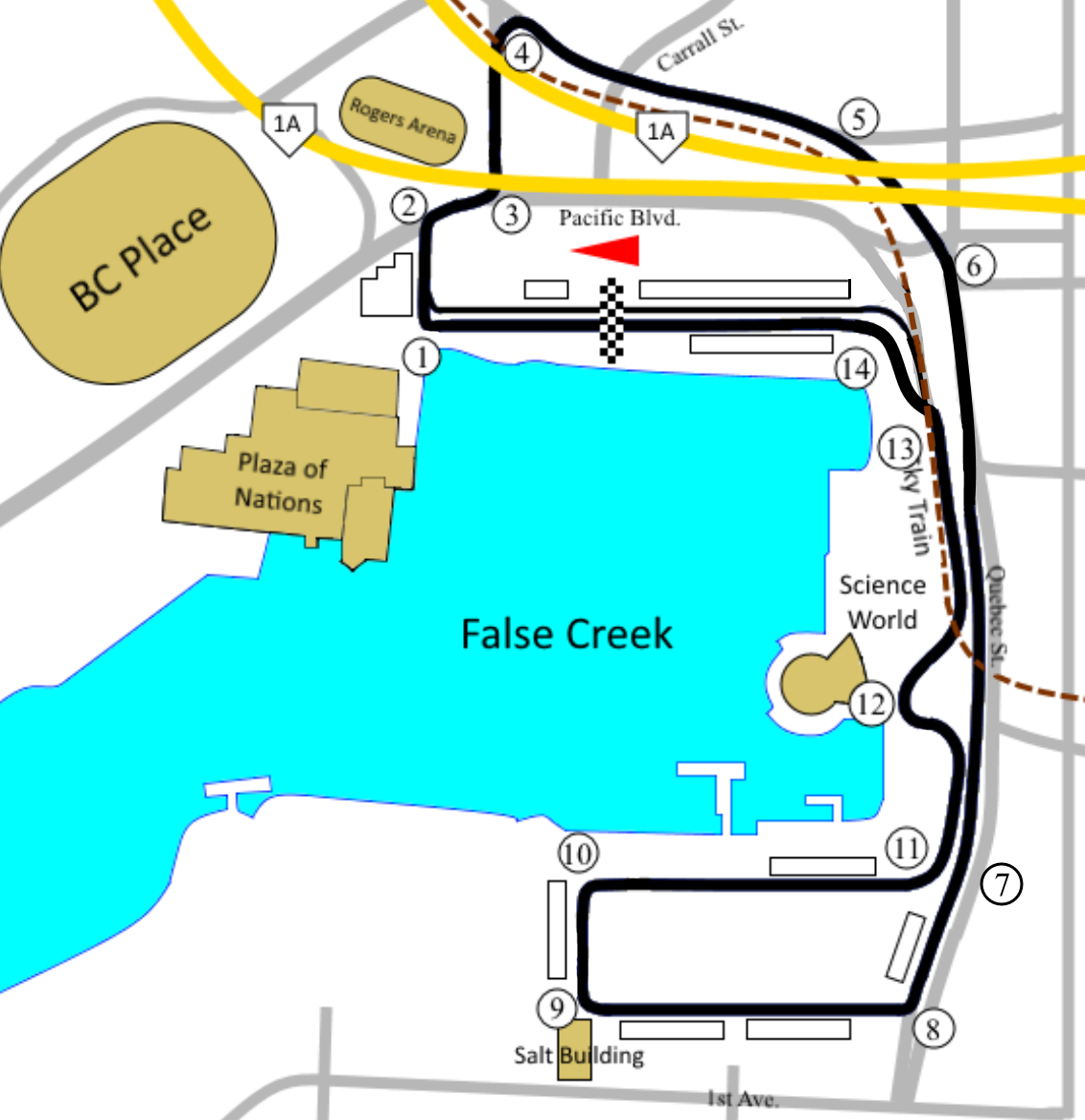
- Date: July 25, 2004
- Official name: Molson Indy Vancouver
- Location: Concord Pacific Place; Vancouver, British Columbia, Canada
- Course: Temporary Street Course; 1.781 mi / 2.866 km
- Distance: 85 laps 151.385 mi / 243.610 km
- Weather: Mostly cloudy skies with temperatures reaching up to 28.6 °C (83.5 °F); which dropped down to 21.2 °C (70.2 °F) by the end of the event

Pole position
- Driver: (Canada) Paul Tracy (Forsythe Championship Racing)
- Time: 1:00.870

Fastest lap
- Driver: (Canada) Paul Tracy (Forsythe Championship Racing)
- Time: 1:01.755 (on lap 71 of 85)

Podium
- First: (Canada) Paul Tracy (Forsythe Championship Racing)
- Second: (Mexico) Michel Jourdain Jr. (RuSPORT)
- Third: (United States) A. J. Allmendinger (RuSPORT)

The 2004 Molson Indy Vancouver was the seventh round of the 2004 Bridgestone Presents the Champ Car World Series Powered by Ford season, held on July 25, 2004 on the streets of Concord Pacific Place in Vancouver, British Columbia, Canada. Paul Tracy swept the pole and the race win. It was the last Champ Car event to take place in Vancouver.

== Qualifying results ==
Pos	Nat	Name	Team	Qual 1	Qual 2	Best
1	(Canada)	Paul Tracy	Forsythe Racing	1:00.870	1:02.889	1:00.870
2	(Mexico)	Rodolfo Lavín	Forsythe Racing	1:02.813	1:00.908	1:00.908
3	(France)	Sébastien Bourdais	Newman/Haas Racing	1:00.974	1:01.355	1:00.974
4	(Mexico)	Mario Domínguez	Herdez Competition	1:02.051	1:01.168	1:01.168
5	(United States)	Memo Gidley	Rocketsports Racing	1:02.071	1:01.365	1:01.365
6	(Canada)	Patrick Carpentier	Forsythe Racing	1:01.398	1:01.579	1:01.398
7	(United Kingdom)	Justin Wilson	Mi-Jack Conquest Racing	1:02.153	1:01.434	1:01.434
8	(Brazil)	Bruno Junqueira	Newman/Haas Racing	1:01.459	1:05.175	1:01.459
9	(Canada)	Alex Tagliani	Rocketsports Racing	1:01.539	1:03.073	1:01.539
10	(United States)	Ryan Hunter-Reay	Herdez Competition	1:01.742	1:01.566	1:01.566
11	(United States)	A. J. Allmendinger	RuSPORT	1:02.135	1:01.588	1:01.588
12	(Mexico)	Michel Jourdain Jr.	RuSPORT	1:02.463	1:01.777	1:01.777
13	(Spain)	Oriol Servià	Dale Coyne Racing	1:01.904	1:01.944	1:01.904
14	(Brazil)	Mario Haberfeld	Walker Racing	1:02.712	1:01.911	1:01.911
15	(United States)	Jimmy Vasser	PKV Racing	1:02.076	1:01.936	1:01.936
16	(Mexico)	Roberto González	PKV Racing	1:02.634	1:02.163	1:02.163
17	(Brazil)	Alex Sperafico	Mi-Jack Conquest Racing	1:03.657	1:03.347	1:03.347
18	(Argentina)	Gastón Mazzacane	Dale Coyne Racing	1:04.520	1:03.757	1:03.757

== Race ==
Pos	No	Driver	Team	Laps	Time/Retired	Grid	Points
1	1	(Canada) Paul Tracy	Forsythe Racing	85	1:34:42.849	1	34
2	9	(Mexico) Michel Jourdain Jr.	RuSPORT	85	+5.557 secs	12	29
3	10	(United States) A. J. Allmendinger	RuSPORT	85	+6.139 secs	11	25
4	6	(Brazil) Bruno Junqueira	Newman/Haas Racing	85	+6.544 secs	8	23
5	2	(France) Sébastien Bourdais	Newman/Haas Racing	85	+14.231 secs	3	22
6	55	(Mexico) Mario Domínguez	Herdez Competition	85	+15.834 secs	4	20
7	8	(Canada) Alex Tagliani	Rocketsports Racing	85	+32.168 secs	9	17
8	4	(United States) Ryan Hunter-Reay	Herdez Competition	85	+32.619 secs	10	15
9	5	(Brazil) Mario Haberfeld	Walker Racing	85	+43.671 secs	14	13
10	12	(United States) Jimmy Vasser	PKV Racing	84	+ 1 Lap	15	11
11	17	(United States) Memo Gidley	Rocketsports Racing	84	+ 1 Lap	5	10
12	11	(Spain) Oriol Servià	Dale Coyne Racing	84	+ 1 Lap	13	9
13	21	(Mexico) Roberto González	PKV Racing	83	+ 2 Laps	16	8
14	34	(United Kingdom) Justin Wilson	Mi-Jack Conquest Racing	80	+ 5 Laps	7	7
15	3	(Mexico) Rodolfo Lavín	Forsythe Racing	66	Engine	2	7
16	7	(Canada) Patrick Carpentier	Forsythe Racing	21	Contact	6	5
17	14	(Brazil) Alex Sperafico	Mi-Jack Conquest Racing	17	Contact	17	4
–	19	(Argentina) Gastón Mazzacane	Dale Coyne Racing	0	DNS	18	0*

* Gastón Mazzacane crashed on the pace lap and did not take the green flag.

== Caution flags ==
Laps	Cause
1	Yellow flag start (Mazzacane (19) contact before green flag)
22-25	Carpentier (7) & Sperafico (14) contact

== Notes ==
Laps	Leader
1-32	Paul Tracy
33	Sébastien Bourdais
34	Mario Domínguez
35-36	Michel Jourdain Jr.
37-85	Paul Tracy

Driver	Laps led
Paul Tracy	81
Michel Jourdain Jr.	2
Sébastien Bourdais	1
Mario Domínguez	1

- New Race Record Paul Tracy 1:34:42.849
- Average Speed 95.900 mph

== Championship standings after the race ==
Drivers' Championship standings

	Pos	Driver	Points
	1	(France) Sébastien Bourdais	186
	2	(Brazil) Bruno Junqueira	159
1	3	(Canada) Paul Tracy	142
1	4	(Canada) Patrick Carpentier	134
	5	(Canada) Alex Tagliani	120

- Note: Only the top five positions are included.

Previous race: 2004 Molson Indy Toronto	Champ Car World Series; 2004 season	Next race: 2004 Grand Prix of Road America
Previous race: 2003 Molson Indy Vancouver	2004 Molson Indy Vancouver	Next race: Final Event
