= 2004 Grand Prix of Road America =

Coordinates: 43°47′51″N 87°59′38″W

(United States) 2004 Road America
Race details
- Race 8 of 14 in the 2004 Champ Car season
- Road America Track Layout
- Date: August 8, 2004
- Official name: Grand Prix of Road America presented by the Chicago Tribune
- Location: Road America, Elkhart Lake, Wisconsin, United States
- Course: Permanent Road Course; 4.048 mi / 6.515 km
- Distance: 48 laps 194.304 mi / 312.720 km
- Weather: Mostly to Partly Cloudy

Pole position
- Driver: (France) Sébastien Bourdais (Newman/Haas Racing)
- Time: 1:43.046

Fastest lap
- Driver: (Brazil) Bruno Junqueira (Newman/Haas Racing)
- Time: 1:45.504 (on lap 39 of 48)

Podium
- First: (Canada) Alex Tagliani (Rocketsports Racing)
- Second: (Mexico) Rodolfo Lavín (Forsythe Championship Racing)
- Third: (France) Sébastien Bourdais (Newman/Haas Racing)

The 2004 Grand Prix of Road America was the eighth round of the 2004 Bridgestone Presented the Champ Car World Series Powered by Ford season, held on August 8, 2004 at Road America in Elkhart Lake, Wisconsin. Sébastien Bourdais won the pole and Alex Tagliani won the race, his first and only win in his Champ Car/IndyCar career.

== Qualifying results ==
Pos	Nat	Name	Team	Qual 1	Qual 2	Best
1	(France)	Sébastien Bourdais	Newman/Haas Racing	1:44.637	1:43.046	1:43.046
2	(United States)	Ryan Hunter-Reay	Herdez Competition	1:43.909	1:43.995	1:43.909
3	(United States)	Jimmy Vasser	PKV Racing	—	1:43.374	1:43.374
4	(Brazil)	Bruno Junqueira	Newman/Haas Racing	1:44.529	1:43.606	1:43.606
5	(Canada)	Patrick Carpentier	Forsythe Racing	1:44.076	1:43.753	1:43.753
6	(Canada)	Paul Tracy	Forsythe Racing	1:46.382	1:43.933	1:43.933
7	(United States)	A. J. Allmendinger	RuSPORT	1:44.972	1:44.058	1:44.058
8	(Spain)	Oriol Servià	Dale Coyne Racing	1:45.077	1:44.105	1:44.105
9	(United Kingdom)	Justin Wilson	Mi-Jack Conquest Racing	1:45.034	1:44.463	1:44.463
10	(Mexico)	Rodolfo Lavín	Forsythe Racing	1:45.269	1:44.663	1:44.663
11	(Mexico)	Michel Jourdain Jr.	RuSPORT	1:45.377	1:44.708	1:44.708
12	(Brazil)	Mario Haberfeld	Walker Racing	1:45.773	1:45.074	1:45.074
13	(Canada)	Alex Tagliani	Rocketsports Racing	—	1:45.172	1:45.172
14	(Mexico)	Roberto González	PKV Racing	1:45.674	1:45.361	1:45.361
15	(Mexico)	Mario Domínguez	Herdez Competition	1:45.496	1:47.701	1:45.496
16	(United Kingdom)	Guy Smith	Rocketsports Racing	1:47.948	1:46.025	1:46.025
17	(Brazil)	Alex Sperafico	Mi-Jack Conquest Racing	1:46.742	1:46.321	1:46.321
18	(Argentina)	Gastón Mazzacane	Dale Coyne Racing	1:46.878	1:47.042	1:46.878

== Race ==
Pos	No	Driver	Team	Laps	Time/Retired	Grid	Points
1	8	(Canada) Alex Tagliani	Rocketsports Racing	48	1:45:07.288	13	33
2	3	(Mexico) Rodolfo Lavín	Forsythe Racing	48	+1.855 secs	10	28
3	2	(France) Sébastien Bourdais	Newman/Haas Racing	48	+2.767 secs	1	27
4	4	(United States) Ryan Hunter-Reay	Herdez Competition	48	+3.814 secs	2	24
5	55	(Mexico) Mario Domínguez	Herdez Competition	48	+4.398 secs	15	21
6	11	(Spain) Oriol Servià	Dale Coyne Racing	48	+6.390 secs	8	19
7	34	(United Kingdom) Justin Wilson	Mi-Jack Conquest Racing	48	+8.500 secs	9	17
8	12	(United States) Jimmy Vasser	PKV Racing	48	+8.546 secs	3	15
9	9	(Mexico) Michel Jourdain Jr.	RuSPORT	48	+9.056 secs	11	13
10	17	(United Kingdom) Guy Smith	Rocketsports Racing	48	+9.997 secs	16	11
11	5	(Brazil) Mario Haberfeld	Walker Racing	48	+16.725 secs	12	10
12	1	(Canada) Paul Tracy	Forsythe Racing	48	+26.616 secs	6	10
13	10	(United States) A. J. Allmendinger	RuSPORT	47	+ 1 Lap	7	8
14	7	(Canada) Patrick Carpentier	Forsythe Racing	46	+ 2 Laps	5	7
15	6	(Brazil) Bruno Junqueira	Newman/Haas Racing	46	+ 2 Laps	4	7
16	21	(Mexico) Roberto González	PKV Racing	46	+ 2 Laps	14	5
17	14	(Brazil) Alex Sperafico	Mi-Jack Conquest Racing	46	+ 2 Laps	17	4
18	19	(Argentina) Gastón Mazzacane	Dale Coyne Racing	29	Off course	18	3

== Caution flags ==
Laps	Cause
1-4	Hunter-Reay (4) & Vasser (12) contact
12-13	González (21) off course
16-18	Junqueira (6) off course
31-33	Mazzacane (19) off course
45-46	Allmendinger (10) & Sperafico (14) spin/stall

== Notes ==
Laps	Leader
1-13	Sébastien Bourdais
14-22	Paul Tracy
23-29	Alex Tagliani
30-36	Paul Tracy
37-39	Alex Tagliani
40-42	Rodolfo Lavín
43-48	Alex Tagliani

Driver	Laps led
Alex Tagliani	16
Paul Tracy	16
Sébastien Bourdais	13
Rodolfo Lavín	3

- New Race Record Alex Tagliani 1:45:07.288
- Average Speed 110.903 mph

== Championship standings after the race ==
Drivers' Championship standings

	Pos	Driver	Points
	1	(France) Sébastien Bourdais	213
	2	(Brazil) Bruno Junqueira	166
2	3	(Canada) Alex Tagliani	153
1	4	(Canada) Paul Tracy	152
1	5	(Canada) Patrick Carpentier	141

- Note: Only the top five positions are included.

== Trivia ==
- As of the conclusion of the 2023 IndyCar Series season, this race remains Alex Tagliani's first and only win in his Champ Car and IndyCar career.

Previous race: 2004 Molson Indy Vancouver	Champ Car World Series; 2004 season	Next race: 2004 Centrix Financial Grand Prix of Denver
Previous race: 2003 Mario Andretti Grand Prix at Road America	2004 Grand Prix of Road America	Next race: 2006 Grand Prix of Road America
