= 2004 U.S. Bank Champ Car Grand Prix of Cleveland =

Coordinates: 41°31′2.3″N 81°40′58.5″W

(United States) 2004 Cleveland
Race details
- Race 5 of 14 in the 2004 Champ Car season
- Burke Lakefront Airport Track Layout
- Date: July 3, 2004
- Official name: U.S. Bank Presents The Champ Car Grand Prix of Cleveland
- Location: Burke Lakefront Airport; Cleveland, Ohio, United States
- Course: Temporary Airport Course; 2.106 mi / 3.389 km
- Distance: 97 laps 204.282 mi / 328.733 km
- Weather: Clear with temperatures reaching up to 80.6 °F (27.0 °C); wind speeds approaching 11.9 miles per hour (19.2 km/h)

Pole position
- Driver: (Canada) Paul Tracy (Forsythe Championship Racing)
- Time: 57.546

Fastest lap
- Driver: (Brazil) Bruno Junqueira (Newman/Haas Racing)
- Time: 58.960 (on lap 95 of 97)

Podium
- First: (France) Sébastien Bourdais (Newman/Haas Racing)
- Second: (Brazil) Bruno Junqueira (Newman/Haas Racing)
- Third: (Canada) Alex Tagliani (Rocketsports Racing)

The 2004 Champ Car Grand Prix of Cleveland was the fifth round of the 2004 Bridgestone Presents the Champ Car World Series Powered by Ford season, held on July 3, 2004 at Burke Lakefront Airport in Cleveland, Ohio. Paul Tracy took the pole while Sébastien Bourdais won the race.

== Qualifying results ==
Pos	Nat	Name	Team	Qual 1	Qual 2	Best
1	(Canada)	Paul Tracy	Forsythe Racing	58.361	57.546	57.546
2	(United Kingdom)	Justin Wilson	Mi-Jack Conquest Racing	58.842	57.954	57.954
3	(France)	Sébastien Bourdais	Newman/Haas Racing	58.731	58.034	58.034
4	(United States)	A. J. Allmendinger	RuSPORT	58.745	58.142	58.142
5	(Canada)	Alex Tagliani	Rocketsports Racing	58.948	58.156	58.156
6	(Brazil)	Bruno Junqueira	Newman/Haas Racing	58.500	58.226	58.226
7	(Canada)	Patrick Carpentier	Forsythe Racing	58.991	58.353	58.353
8	(Mexico)	Michel Jourdain Jr.	RuSPORT	59.448	58.442	58.442
9	(United States)	Ryan Hunter-Reay	Herdez Competition	58.529	58.909	58.529
10	(United States)	Jimmy Vasser	PKV Racing	58.782	58.539	58.539
11	(Mexico)	Mario Domínguez	Herdez Competition	59.258	58.771	58.771
12	(Brazil)	Mario Haberfeld	Walker Racing	59.348	58.779	58.779
13	(Spain)	Oriol Servià	Dale Coyne Racing	1:00.081	59.140	59.140
14	(Mexico)	Roberto González	PKV Racing	1:00.419	59.263	59.263
15	(Mexico)	Rodolfo Lavín	Forsythe Racing	59.384	59.360	59.360
16	(France)	Nelson Philippe	Rocketsports Racing	1:00.282	59.585	59.585
17	(Brazil)	Alex Sperafico	Mi-Jack Conquest Racing	1:00.428	1:00.186	1:00.186
18	(Argentina)	Gastón Mazzacane	Dale Coyne Racing	1:00.465	1:00.217	1:00.217

== Race ==
Pos	No	Driver	Team	Laps	Time/Retired	Grid	Points
1	2	(France) Sébastien Bourdais	Newman/Haas Racing	97	1:48:16.056	3	32
2	6	(Brazil) Bruno Junqueira	Newman/Haas Racing	97	+15.130 secs	6	28
3	8	(Canada) Alex Tagliani	Rocketsports Racing	97	+27.584 secs	5	25
4	11	(Spain) Oriol Servià	Dale Coyne Racing	97	+38.196 secs	13	25
5	12	(United States) Jimmy Vasser	PKV Racing	97	+41.901 secs	10	21
6	10	(United States) A. J. Allmendinger	RuSPORT	97	+42.358 secs	4	19
7	21	(Mexico) Roberto González	PKV Racing	97	+58.663 secs	14	17
8	55	(Mexico) Mario Domínguez	Herdez Competition	96	+ 1 Lap	11	15
9	3	(Mexico) Rodolfo Lavín	Forsythe Racing	96	+ 1 Lap	15	13
10	17	(France) Nelson Philippe	Rocketsports Racing	95	+ 2 Laps	16	11
11	4	(United States) Ryan Hunter-Reay	Herdez Competition	95	+ 2 Laps	9	10
12	19	(Argentina) Gastón Mazzacane	Dale Coyne Racing	94	+ 3 Laps	18	9
13	14	(Brazil) Alex Sperafico	Mi-Jack Conquest Racing	93	+ 4 Laps	17	8
14	5	(Brazil) Mario Haberfeld	Walker Racing	80	Gearbox	12	7
15	9	(Mexico) Michel Jourdain Jr.	RuSPORT	61	Contact	8	7
16	7	(Canada) Patrick Carpentier	Forsythe Racing	20	Engine	7	5
17	1	(Canada) Paul Tracy	Forsythe Racing	2	Contact	1	6
18	34	(United Kingdom) Justin Wilson	Mi-Jack Conquest Racing	0	Contact	2	3

== Caution flags ==
Laps	Cause
1-4	Wilson (34) & others contact
40-43	Debris
44-47	Hunter-Reay (4) spin/stall

== Notes ==
Laps	Leader
1-25	Sébastien Bourdais
26-27	Oriol Servià
28	Michel Jourdain Jr.
29-53	Sébastien Bourdais
54-59	Michel Jourdain Jr.
60-97	Sébastien Bourdais

Driver	Laps led
Sébastien Bourdais	88
Michel Jourdain Jr.	7
Oriol Servià	2

- New Race Record Sébastien Bourdais 1:48:16.056
- Average Speed 113.209 mph

== Championship standings after the race ==
Drivers' Championship standings

	Pos	Driver	Points
	1	(Brazil) Bruno Junqueira	133
1	2	(France) Sébastien Bourdais	130
1	3	(Canada) Patrick Carpentier	104
4	4	(Canada) Alex Tagliani	86
1	5	(Canada) Paul Tracy	85

- Note: Only the top five positions are included.

Previous race: 2004 Champ Car Grand Prix of Portland	Champ Car World Series; 2004 season	Next race: 2004 Molson Indy Toronto
Previous race: 2003 U.S. Bank Cleveland Grand Prix	2004 U.S. Bank Champ Car Grand Prix of Cleveland	Next race: 2005 Grand Prix of Cleveland
