= 2004 Toyota Grand Prix of Long Beach =

Coordinates: 33°45′59″N 118°11′34″W

(United States) 2004 Long Beach
Race details
- Race 1 of 14 in the 2004 Champ Car season
- Long Beach Track Layout
- Date: April 18, 2004
- Official name: Toyota Grand Prix of Long Beach
- Location: Long Beach Street Circuit; Long Beach, California, United States
- Course: Temporary street circuit 1.968 mi / 3.167 km
- Distance: 81 laps 159.408 mi / 256.527 km
- Weather: Temperatures up to 66.9 °F (19.4 °C); wind speeds up to 13 miles per hour (21 km/h)

Pole position
- Driver: (Brazil) Bruno Junqueira (Newman/Haas Racing)
- Time: 1:08.913

Fastest lap
- Driver: (France) Sébastien Bourdais (Newman/Haas Racing)
- Time: 1:09.729 (on lap 71 of 81)

Podium
- First: (Canada) Paul Tracy (Forsythe Championship Racing)
- Second: (Brazil) Bruno Junqueira (Newman/Haas Racing)
- Third: (France) Sébastien Bourdais (Newman/Haas Racing)

Chronology
Previous	Next
2003	2005

The 2004 Toyota Grand Prix of Long Beach was the first round of the 2004 Bridgestone Presents the Champ Car World Series Powered by Ford season, held on April 18, 2004 on the Long Beach Street Circuit. It was the first event for the new Champ Car World Series which was created when Gerald Forsythe, Kevin Kalkhoven, Paul Gentilozzi and Dan Petit purchased the bankrupt CART series' liquidated assets in an Indianapolis courtroom the previous January. Bruno Junqueira won the first Champ Car-era pole while Paul Tracy took the first win.

== Qualifying results ==
Pos	Nat	Name	Team	Qual 1	Qual 2	Best
1	(Brazil)	Bruno Junqueira	Newman/Haas Racing	1:08.913	1:11.237	1:08.913
2	(France)	Sébastien Bourdais	Newman/Haas Racing	1:10.033	1:09.800	1:09.800
3	(Canada)	Paul Tracy	Forsythe Racing	1:09.156	1:10.196	1:09.156
4	(Canada)	Alex Tagliani	Rocketsports Racing	1:09.450	1:10.673	1:09.450
5	(Mexico)	Mario Domínguez	Herdez Competition	1:09.458	1:09.830	1:09.458
6	(United States)	Ryan Hunter-Reay	Herdez Competition	1:09.613	1:10.219	1:09.613
7	(Canada)	Patrick Carpentier	Forsythe Racing	1:09.730	1:12.023	1:09.730
8	(United States)	A. J. Allmendinger	RuSPORT	1:09.905	1:11.039	1:09.905
9	(Mexico)	Rodolfo Lavín	Forsythe Racing	1:09.953	1:11.793	1:09.953
10	(United States)	Jimmy Vasser	PKV Racing	1:10.056	1:10.749	1:10.056
11	(United Kingdom)	Justin Wilson	Mi-Jack Conquest Racing	1:10.122	1:11.168	1:10.122
12	(Spain)	Oriol Servià	Dale Coyne Racing	-*	1:10.273	1:10.273
13	(Mexico)	Michel Jourdain Jr.	RuSPORT	1:10.912	1:10.652	1:10.652
14	(Brazil)	Mario Haberfeld	Walker Racing	1:10.988	1:11.843	1:10.988
15	(Brazil)	Alex Sperafico	Mi-Jack Conquest Racing	1:11.238	–	1:11.238
16	(France)	Nelson Philippe	Rocketsports Racing	1:11.275	1:12.022	1:11.275
17	(Mexico)	Roberto González	PKV Racing	1:11.295	1:12.021	1:11.295
18	(Brazil)	Tarso Marques	Dale Coyne Racing	1:16.809	1:16.863	1:16.809

*The time of Oriol Servià from qualification session #1 was disallowed after his car failed post-session technical inspection.

== Race ==
Pos	No	Driver	Team	Laps	Time/Retired	Grid	Points
1	1	(Canada) Paul Tracy	Forsythe Racing	81	1:44:12.348	3	32
2	6	(Brazil) Bruno Junqueira	Newman/Haas Racing	81	+5.681 secs	1	29
3	2	(France) Sébastien Bourdais	Newman/Haas Racing	81	+6.375 secs	2	27
4	7	(Canada) Patrick Carpentier	Forsythe Racing	81	+16.801 secs	7	24
5	55	(Mexico) Mario Domínguez	Herdez Competition	81	+17.527 secs	5	21
6	34	(United Kingdom) Justin Wilson	Mi-Jack Conquest Racing	81	+36.645 secs	11	20
7	4	(United States) Ryan Hunter-Reay	Herdez Competition	81	+38.926 secs	6	17
8	8	(Canada) Alex Tagliani	Rocketsports Racing	81	+1:00.578	4	15
9	5	(Brazil) Mario Haberfeld	Walker Racing	80	+ 1 Lap	14	13
10	3	(Mexico) Rodolfo Lavín	Forsythe Racing	80	+ 1 Lap	9	11
11	9	(Mexico) Michel Jourdain Jr.	RuSPORT	80	+ 1 Lap	13	10
12	10	(United States) A. J. Allmendinger	RuSPORT	79	+ 2 Laps	8	9
13	17	(France) Nelson Philippe	Rocketsports Racing	78	+ 3 Laps	16	8
14	21	(Mexico) Roberto González	PKV Racing	76	Gearbox	17	7
15	11	(Spain) Oriol Servià	Dale Coyne Racing	14	Oil Leak	12	6
16	12	(United States) Jimmy Vasser	PKV Racing	1	Contact	10	5
17	14	(Brazil) Alex Sperafico	Mi-Jack Conquest Racing	1	Contact	15	4
18	19	(Brazil) Tarso Marques	Dale Coyne Racing	1	Contact	18	3

== Caution flags ==
Laps	Cause
1–5	Yellow start; Multiple car contact

== Lap leaders ==
Laps	Leader
1	Bruno Junqueira
2–58	Paul Tracy
59–60	Patrick Carpentier
61–81	Paul Tracy

Driver	Laps led
Paul Tracy	78
Patrick Carpentier	2
Bruno Junqueira	1

- New Race Record Paul Tracy 1:44:12.348
- Average Speed 91.785 mph

Previous race: 2003 King Taco 500; Previous Season	Champ Car World Series; 2004 season	Next race: 2004 Tecate/Telmex Grand Prix of Monterrey
Previous race: 2003 Toyota Grand Prix of Long Beach	2004 Toyota Grand Prix of Long Beach	Next race: 2005 Toyota Grand Prix of Long Beach
