= 2004 Champ Car World Series =

American motorsport season

2004 Champ Car season
- Bridgestone Presents the Champ Car World Series Powered by Ford

Season
- Races: 14
- Start date: April 18
- End date: November 7

Awards
- Drivers' champion: (France) Sébastien Bourdais
- Constructors' Cup: (United Kingdom) Lola
- Nations' Cup: Canada
- Rookie of the Year: (United States) A. J. Allmendinger

The 2004 Champ Car World Series season was the 26th overall season in the CART/Champ Car genealogy, and the first under the ownership of Open-Wheel Racing Series (OWRS) as the Champ Car World Series. It began on April 18, 2004, and ended on November 7 after 14 races. For sponsorship purposes, it was branded as Bridgestone Presents the Champ Car World Series Powered by Ford. The Drivers' Champion was Sébastien Bourdais. The Rookie of the Year was A. J. Allmendinger.

The open-wheel racing organization Championship Auto Racing Teams, Inc. had operated until 2003. After that year's season, CART declared bankruptcy and was liquidated in an Indianapolis courtroom in January 2004. Three team owners who had participated in the CART series, Gerald Forsythe, Kevin Kalkhoven, and Paul Gentilozzi, purchased CART's liquidated assets and resurrected it as Open-Wheel Racing Series for the 2004 season.

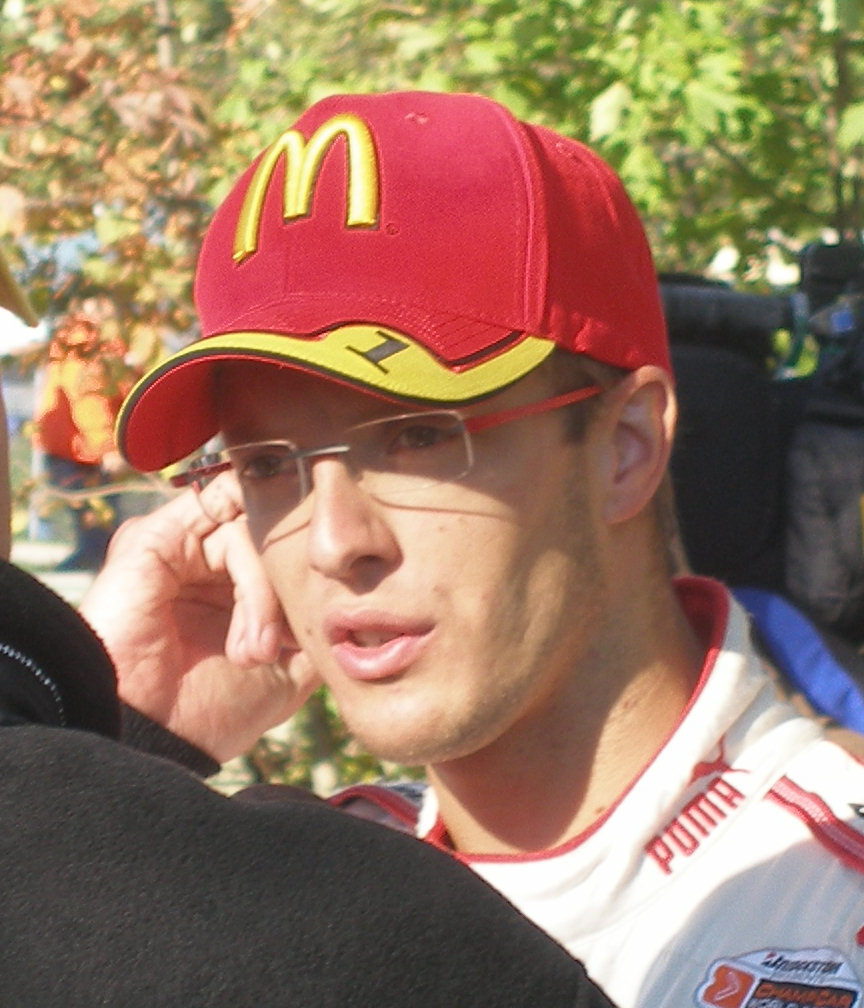
Frenchman Sébastien Bourdais would win his first of four consecutive drivers' title driving for Newman-Haas Racing

Champ Car races were broadcast on Spike TV. Also, high-definition live broadcasts were on HDNet. This was the last CART/Champ Car season which would see chassis from more than manufacturer used during the season as the Lola B02/00 chassis (introduced in 2002) would become the sole chassis for the series for the next two seasons before the Panoz DP01 took over as the sole chassis for 2007.

== Drivers and teams ==
The Ford-Cosworth XFE, a 2.65 liter turbo V8 engine remained the exclusive power plant for the reorganized Champ Car series. Bridgestone remained the exclusive tire supplier as well. They also continued the marketing agreement that branded the series Bridgestone Presents the Champ Car World Series Powered by Ford. The following teams and drivers competed in the 2004 Champ Car season. The would be the last Champ Car season in which any team would run a Reynard chassis during the season.

Team	Chassis	No	Drivers	Races	Primary Sponsors
(United States) Forsythe Championship Racing	Lola B02/00	1	(Canada) Paul Tracy	All	Indeck
(United States) Forsythe Championship Racing	Lola B02/00	3	(Mexico) Rodolfo Lavín	All	Corona
(United States) Forsythe Championship Racing	Lola B02/00	7	(Canada) Patrick Carpentier	All	Indeck
(United States) Newman/Haas Racing	Lola B02/00	2	(France) Sébastien Bourdais	All	McDonald's
(United States) Newman/Haas Racing	Lola B02/00	6	(Brazil) Bruno Junqueira	All	PacifiCare
(Mexico) Herdez Competition	Lola B02/00	4	(United States) Ryan Hunter-Reay	All	Herdez
(Mexico) Herdez Competition	Lola B02/00	55	(Mexico) Mario Domínguez	All	Herdez
(United States) Walker Racing	Reynard 02I	5	(Brazil) Mário Haberfeld	All	Cummins
(United States) Walker Racing	Reynard 02I	15	(Australia) David Besnard	13	Wright-Patton-Shakespeare
(United States) Walker Racing	Reynard 02I	15	(Canada) Michael Valiante	14	Wildlife Conservation Network
(United States) Rocketsports Racing	Lola B02/00	8	(Canada) Alex Tagliani	All	Johnson Controls
(United States) Rocketsports Racing	Lola B02/00	17	(France) Nelson Philippe	1–5	LeasePlan 6 U.S. Air Force Reserve 1 Rocketsports Racing 4 Microchip 2 Swift Leisure 1
(United States) Rocketsports Racing	Lola B02/00	17	(United States) Memo Gidley	6–7	LeasePlan 6 U.S. Air Force Reserve 1 Rocketsports Racing 4 Microchip 2 Swift Leisure 1
(United States) Rocketsports Racing	Lola B02/00	17	(United Kingdom) Guy Smith	8–14	LeasePlan 6 U.S. Air Force Reserve 1 Rocketsports Racing 4 Microchip 2 Swift Leisure 1
(United States) RuSPORT	Lola B02/00	9	(Mexico) Michel Jourdain Jr.	All	Gigante
(United States) RuSPORT	Lola B02/00	10	(United States) A. J. Allmendinger	All	BG Products 5 Western Union 8 Lance Armstrong Foundation 1
(United States) PKV Racing	Lola B02/00	12	(United States) Jimmy Vasser	All	Gulfstream
(United States) PKV Racing	Lola B02/00	21	(Mexico) Roberto González	All	NII Holdings
(United States) Mi-Jack Conquest Racing	Reynard 02I	14	(Brazil) Alex Sperafico	1–8	Mi-Jack 12; TSI 1 Scotiabank Inverlat 1
(United States) Mi-Jack Conquest Racing	Reynard 02I	14	(France) Nelson Philippe	9	Mi-Jack 12; TSI 1 Scotiabank Inverlat 1
(United States) Mi-Jack Conquest Racing	Lola B02/00	14	(France) Nelson Philippe	10–14	Mi-Jack 12; TSI 1 Scotiabank Inverlat 1
(United States) Mi-Jack Conquest Racing	Lola B02/00	34	(United Kingdom) Justin Wilson	1–2, 4–14	Mi-Jack
(United States) Mi-Jack Conquest Racing	Reynard 02I	34	(United Kingdom) Justin Wilson	3	Mi-Jack
(United States) Dale Coyne Racing	Lola B02/00	11	(Spain) Oriol Servià	All	YokeTV.com
(United States) Dale Coyne Racing	Lola B02/00	19	(Brazil) Tarso Marques	1–2, 14	American Medical Response
(United States) Dale Coyne Racing	Lola B02/00	19	(Argentina) Gastón Mazzacane	3–12	American Medical Response
(United States) Dale Coyne Racing	Lola B02/00	19	(Czech Republic) Jarek Janiš	13	American Medical Response

=== From CART to Champ Car ===
On January 28, 2004, the assets of the bankrupt Championship Auto Racing Teams, Inc. (CART) were awarded to Open-Wheel Racing Series, LLC, over a bid from Indy Racing League owner Tony George as the judge decided that OWRS's bid would allow CART's debt holders a better chance at recouping their money. Despite this victory, the OWRS partners Kevin Kalkhoven, Gerald Forsythe, and Paul Gentilozzi, would still have to work hard to ensure the 18 racecars they promised would be on track for the scheduled Grand Prix of Long Beach on April 18. Two CART teams founded in 2003, American Spirit Team Johansson and Fittipaldi-Dingman Racing, would not race in 2004, while U. E. Patrick, one of the original founders of CART, sold off his CART team assets before starting a short-lived IRL effort.

=== Long Beach Season Premiere and its aftermath ===
On March 9 a "Season Premiere" promotional event was held in Long Beach, California, announcing 12 confirmed drivers and a 16 race schedule. However, just two days later on March 11, Adrián Fernández threw the plans for the season into serious doubt by announcing the one car team he had presented at Long Beach would not compete in the Champ Car series. He instead expanded his Indy Racing League team to two cars (even though the IRL season had already seen its first race). Another blow came a week later on March 18 when Bobby Rahal, onetime CEO of CART and 3 time series champion and who also presented a one car team in Long Beach, announced he would not compete in CART and would also run a two car IRL team like Fernández.

=== Champ Car makes it to Long Beach ===
Momentum for Champ Car began to turn in the aftermath of Rahal's exit when his driver, Michel Jourdain Jr., announced that he and his sponsor, the Mexican supermarket Gigante would not follow Rahal to the IRL. Jourdain ended up driving for the new RuSPORT team, partnering with rookie A. J. Allmendinger. On March 20, Herdez Competition announced that Ryan Hunter-Reay would race a 2nd car for them. On March 24 Gerald Forsythe expanded his team from two cars to three, providing a seat for Patrick Carpentier. Conquest Racing announced a two car team featuring ex-Formula One driver Justin Wilson on March 25, with Alex Sperafico filling the second seat two days later. Walker Racing's one car team announced on April 8 proved to be the final piece of the puzzle to get to the 18 car field promised by the Champ Car partners in January. Although his participation with two cars was already known, Dale Coyne waited until just before practice began for the Grand Prix of Long Beach to announce that his drivers would be Champ Car veterans Oriol Servià and Tarso Marques.

=== Mid-season changes ===
- Ex F1 Driver Gastón Mazzacane replaced Tarso Marques at Dale Coyne Racing beginning with the race in Milwaukee.
- Rocketsports Racing swapped out rookie driver Nelson Philippe for Champ Car veteran Memo Gidley after "contractual issues" at Toronto.
- Rocketsports changed drivers again for the Road America round, bringing in Indy Lights and sports car veteran Guy Smith to replace Memo Gidley.
- Mi-Jack Conquest Racing brought in Nelson Philippe to take the place of Alex Sperafico beginning with the Denver round.
- Mi-Jack Conquest's #14 team began racing a Lola chassis beginning in Montreal.
- Walker Racing brought out a second car for the final two rounds of the season. Australian David Besnard drove the car at Surfer's Paradise. Toyota Atlantic veteran Michael Valiante took over the drive at Mexico City.
- Dale Coyne Racing replaced Gastón Mazzacane with Jarek Janiš for the race at Surfer's Paradise.
- Tarso Marques returned to Dale Coyne Racing for the final race of the season at Mexico City.

=== Rule changes ===
- The mandatory pit window rule from the previous two seasons was eliminated. At early races, teams were given a mandatory number of green flag pit stops but this was also dropped after the first two races of the season. However, the rule was re-instituted for the Las Vegas round to eliminate a possible fuel economy race with no push to pass.
- For non-oval track races, Bridgestone introduced two types of tires, both of which had to be used unless wet weather tires were used: A primary black-walled tire and a secondary red-walled option tire. The option tire was a softer, faster tire but less durable than the primary tire.
- For non-oval track races, Ford-Cosworth introduced the "push to pass" button, giving each driver an additional 50 horsepower for 60 seconds per race. The driver activated the function with a green button on the steering wheel, the boost would continue until the driver took his foot off the throttle for 1 second or time ran out.

== Schedule ==
Icon	Legend
O	Oval/Speedway
R	Road course
S	Street circuit

Rnd	Date	Race Name	Circuit	City/Location
1	April 18	(United States) Toyota Grand Prix of Long Beach	S Streets of Long Beach	Long Beach, California
2	May 23	(Mexico) Tecate/Telmex Grand Prix of Monterrey	R Fundidora Park	Monterrey, Mexico
3	June 5	(United States) The Time Warner Cable Roadrunner 250	O Milwaukee Mile	West Allis, Wisconsin
4	June 20	(United States) Champ Car Grand Prix of Portland	R Portland International Raceway	Portland, Oregon
5	July 3	(United States) Champ Car Grand Prix of Cleveland	R Cleveland Burke Lakefront Airport	Cleveland, Ohio
6	July 11	(Canada) Molson Indy Toronto	S Exhibition Place	Toronto, Canada
7	July 25	(Canada) Molson Indy Vancouver	S Concord Pacific Place	Vancouver, Canada
8	August 8	(United States) Grand Prix of Road America	R Road America	Elkhart Lake, Wisconsin
9	August 15	(United States) Centrix Financial Grand Prix of Denver	S Denver Civic Center	Denver, Colorado
10	August 29	(Canada) Molson Indy Montreal	R Circuit Gilles Villeneuve	Montreal, Canada
11	September 12	(United States) Bridgestone Grand Prix of Monterey	R Mazda Raceway Laguna Seca	Monterey, California
12	September 25	(United States) Bridgestone 400	O Las Vegas Motor Speedway	Las Vegas, Nevada
13	October 24	(Australia) Lexmark Indy 300	S Surfers Paradise Street Circuit	Surfers Paradise, Australia
14	November 7	(Mexico) Gran Premio Telmex-Tecate	R Autódromo Hermanos Rodríguez	Mexico City, Mexico

The initial schedule announced by Champ Car at the Long Beach Season Premiere event included 16 races. One event that didn't make the final schedule was a race on a street circuit in Seoul, South Korea on October 17, a week before the Surfers Paradise race, but the race was cancelled on September 24 because of "environmental issues", two months after reports that government approval for a race near Seoul World Cup Stadium could not be arranged in time. The second was a "TBA" event that was scheduled to take place somewhere in the United States after the Gran Premio Telmex/Tecate in Mexico City and never materialized. A second TBA event on the initial schedule became the Bridgestone 400 on September 25 at the Las Vegas Motor Speedway, which was announced on July 7.

== Results ==
Rnd	Race Name	Pole position	Fastest lap	Led most laps	Winning driver	Winning team	Report
1	(United States) Toyota Grand Prix of Long Beach	(Brazil) Bruno Junqueira	(France) Sébastien Bourdais	(Canada) Paul Tracy	(Canada) Paul Tracy	Forsythe Championship Racing	Report
2	(Mexico) Tecate/Telmex Grand Prix of Monterrey	(France) Sébastien Bourdais	(France) Sébastien Bourdais	(France) Sébastien Bourdais	(France) Sébastien Bourdais	Newman/Haas Racing	Report
3	(United States) The Time Warner Cable Roadrunner 250	(United States) Ryan Hunter-Reay	(United States) Ryan Hunter-Reay	(United States) Ryan Hunter-Reay	(United States) Ryan Hunter-Reay	Herdez Competition	Report
4	(United States) Champ Car Grand Prix of Portland	(France) Sébastien Bourdais	(Brazil) Bruno Junqueira	(France) Sébastien Bourdais	(France) Sébastien Bourdais	Newman/Haas Racing	Report
5	(United States) U.S. Bank Presents the Champ Car Grand Prix of Cleveland	(Canada) Paul Tracy	(Brazil) Bruno Junqueira	(France) Sébastien Bourdais	(France) Sébastien Bourdais	Newman/Haas Racing	Report
6	(Canada) Molson Indy Toronto	(France) Sébastien Bourdais	(France) Sébastien Bourdais	(France) Sébastien Bourdais	(France) Sébastien Bourdais	Newman/Haas Racing	Report
7	(Canada) Molson Indy Vancouver	(Canada) Paul Tracy	(Canada) Paul Tracy	(Canada) Paul Tracy	(Canada) Paul Tracy	Forsythe Championship Racing	Report
8	(United States) Grand Prix of Road America Presented by the Chicago Tribune	(France) Sébastien Bourdais	(Brazil) Bruno Junqueira	(Canada) Paul Tracy (Canada) Alex Tagliani	(Canada) Alex Tagliani	Rocketsports Racing	Report
9	(United States) Centrix Financial Grand Prix of Denver	(France) Sébastien Bourdais	(France) Sébastien Bourdais	(Canada) Paul Tracy	(France) Sébastien Bourdais	Newman/Haas Racing	Report
10	(Canada) Molson Indy Montreal	(France) Sébastien Bourdais	(France) Sébastien Bourdais	(France) Sébastien Bourdais	(Brazil) Bruno Junqueira	Newman/Haas Racing	Report
11	(United States) Bridgestone Grand Prix of Monterey	(France) Sébastien Bourdais	(Mexico) Mario Domínguez	(Canada) Patrick Carpentier	(Canada) Patrick Carpentier	Forsythe Championship Racing	Report
12	(United States) Bridgestone 400 Presented by Corona	(Canada) Patrick Carpentier	(Brazil) Bruno Junqueira	(France) Sébastien Bourdais	(France) Sébastien Bourdais	Newman/Haas Racing	Report
13	(Australia) Lexmark Indy 300	(Canada) Paul Tracy	(Brazil) Bruno Junqueira	(Canada) Paul Tracy	(Brazil) Bruno Junqueira	Newman/Haas Racing	Report
14	(Mexico) Gran Premio Telmex-Tecate Presented by Banamex	(France) Sébastien Bourdais	(France) Sébastien Bourdais	(France) Sébastien Bourdais	(France) Sébastien Bourdais	Newman/Haas Racing	Report

=== Final driver standings ===
Pos	Driver	LBH (United States)	FUN (Mexico)	MIL (United States)	POR (United States)	CLE (United States)	TOR (Canada)	VAN (Canada)	ROA (United States)	DEN (United States)	CGV (Canada)	LAG (United States)	LVS (United States)	SUR (Australia)	MXC (Mexico)	Pts
1	(France) Sébastien Bourdais	3	**1***	18	**1***	1*	**1***	5	**3**	**1**	**15***	**8**	1*	2	**1***	369
2	(Brazil) Bruno Junqueira	**2**	2	6	2	2	18	4	15	3	1	2	2	1	2	341
3	(Canada) Patrick Carpentier	4	4	2	4	16	3	16	14	9	2	1*	**3**	16	6	266
4	(Canada) Paul Tracy	1*	7	17	3	**17**	5	**1***	12	2*	4	10	18	**4***	10	254
5	(Mexico) Mario Domínguez	5	3	8	17	8	17	6	5	4	3	11	7	3	8	244
6	(United States) A. J. Allmendinger RY	12	17	5	6	6	11	3	13	5	5	15	6	6	3	229
7	(Canada) Alex Tagliani	8	5	13	7	3	7	7	1*	10	7	6	16	19	11	218
8	(United States) Jimmy Vasser	16	12	4	8	5	2	10	8	17	8	17	5	12	5	201
9	(United States) Ryan Hunter-Reay	7	8	**1***	12	11	8	8	4	16	18	5	13	5	19	199
10	(Spain) Oriol Servià	15	14	7	11	4	9	12	6	6	9	3	12	13	7	199
11	(United Kingdom) Justin Wilson R	6	6	11	5	18	12	14	7	7	14	18	8	8	4	188
12	(Mexico) Michel Jourdain Jr.	11	11	3	14	15	15	2	9	14	6	4	11	17	9	185
13	(Brazil) Mário Haberfeld	9	15	10	9	14	4	9	11	8	13	7	14	14	15	157
14	(Mexico) Rodolfo Lavín	10	13	9	18	9	14	15	2	11	11	12	4	15	13	156
15	(Mexico) Roberto González R	14	9	12	10	7	13	13	16	12	10	14	10	11	12	136
16	(France) Nelson Philippe R	13	10	14	15	10				13	17	16	9	10	16	89
17	(Argentina) Gastón Mazzacane R			16	13	12	6	18	18	15	12	13	15			73
18	(United Kingdom) Guy Smith R								10	18	16	9	17	9	17	53
19	(Brazil) Alex Sperafico R	17	16	15	16	13	10	17	17							47
20	(Australia) David Besnard R													7		18
21	(United States) Memo Gidley						16	11								15
22	(Brazil) Tarso Marques	18	18												18	9
23	(Canada) Michael Valiante R														14	7
24	(Czech Republic) Jarek Janiš R													18		3
Pos	Driver	LBH (United States)	FUN (Mexico)	MIL (United States)	POR (United States)	CLE (United States)	TOR (Canada)	VAN (Canada)	ROA (United States)	DEN (United States)	CGV (Canada)	LAG (United States)	LVS (United States)	SUR (Australia)	MXC (Mexico)	Pts

Color	Result
Gold	Winner
Silver	2nd place
Bronze	3rd place
Green	4th & 5th place
Light Blue	6th-10th place
Dark Blue	Finished (Outside Top 10)
Purple	Did not finish
Red	Did not qualify (DNQ)
Brown	Withdrawn (Wth)
Black	Disqualified (DSQ)
White	Did not start (DNS)
Blank	Did not participate (DNP)
Blank	Not competing

**In-line notation**
**Bold**	Pole position
Italics	Ran fastest race lap
*	Led most race laps
RY Rookie of the Year
R Rookie

=== Nations' Cup ===
- Top result per race counts towards the Nations' Cup

Pos	Country	LBH (United States)	FUN (Mexico)	MIL (United States)	POR (United States)	CLE (United States)	TOR (Canada)	VAN (Canada)	ROA (United States)	DEN (United States)	CGV (Canada)	LAG (United States)	LAS (United States)	SUR (Australia)	MXC (Mexico)	Pts
1	Canada	1	4	2	3	3	3	1	1	2	2	1	3	4	6	380
2	France	3	1	14	1	1	1	5	3	1	15	8	1	2	1	358
3	Brazil	2	2	6	2	2	4	4	11	3	1	2	2	1	2	352
4	United States	7	8	1	6	5	2	3	4	5	5	5	5	5	3	310
5	Mexico	5	3	3	10	7	13	2	2	4	3	4	4	3	8	295
6	Spain	15	14	7	11	4	9	12	6	6	9	3	12	13	7	195
7	England	6	6	11	5	18	12	14	7	7	14	9	8	8	4	195
8	Argentina			16	13	12	6	18	18	15	12	13	15			73
9	Australia													7		17
10	Czech Republic													18		3
Pos	Country	LBH (United States)	FUN (Mexico)	MIL (United States)	POR (United States)	CLE (United States)	TOR (Canada)	VAN (Canada)	ROA (United States)	DEN (United States)	CGV (Canada)	LAG (United States)	LAS (United States)	SUR (Australia)	MXC (Mexico)	Pts

=== Chassis Constructors' Cup ===
Pos	Chassis	Pts
1	(United Kingdom) Lola	462
2	(United Kingdom) Reynard	168
Pos	Chassis	Pts

=== Driver breakdown ===
Pos	Driver	Team	Entries	Wins	Podiums	Top 5	Top 10	Poles	Laps Led	Pts
1	(France) Bourdais	(United States) Newman-Haas Racing	14	7	10	11	12	8	506	369
2	(Brazil) Junqueira	(United States) Newman-Haas Racing	14	2	10	11	12	1	123	341
3	(Canada) Carpentier	(United States) Forsythe Championship Racing	14	1	5	8	10	1	66	266
4	(Canada) Tracy	(United States) Forsythe Championship Racing	14	2	4	7	10	3	286	254
5	(Mexico) Domínguez	(Mexico) Herdez Competition	14	--	3	6	11	--	10	244
6	(United States) Allmendinger	(United States) RuSPORT	14	--	2	5	9	--	16	229
7	(Canada) Tagliani	(United States) Rocketsports Racing	14	1	2	3	10	--	29	218
8	(United States) Vasser	(United States) PKV Racing	14	--	1	5	9	--	5	201
9	(United States) Hunter-Reay	(Mexico) Herdez Competition	14	1	1	4	8	1	250	199
10	(Spain) Servià	(United States) Dale Coyne Racing	14	--	1	2	8	--	6	199
11	(United Kingdom) Wilson	(United States) Mi-Jack Conquest Racing	14	--	--	2	8	--	1	188
12	(Mexico) Jourdain Jr.	(United States) RuSPORT	14	--	2	3	6	--	13	185
13	(Brazil) Haberfeld	(United States) Walker Racing	14	--	--	1	7	--	--	157
14	(Mexico) Lavín	(United States) Forsythe Championship Racing	14	--	1	2	5	--	3	156
15	(Mexico) González	(United States) PKV Racing	14	--	--	--	5	--	--	136
16	(France) Philippe	(United States) Rocketsports Racing (United States) Mi-Jack Conquest Racing	11	--	--	--	4	--	--	89
17	(Argentina) Mazzacane R	(United States) Dale Coyne Racing	10	--	--	--	1	--	--	73
18	(United Kingdom) Smith	(United States) Rocketsports Racing	7	--	--	--	3	--	--	53
19	(Brazil) Sperafico R	(United States) Mi-Jack Conquest Racing	8	--	--	--	1	--	--	47
20	(Australia) Besnard	(United States) Walker Racing	1	--	--	--	1	--	--	18
21	(Mexico) Gidley	(United States) Rocketsports Racing	2	--	--	--	--	--	--	15
22	(Brazil) Marques	(United States) Dale Coyne Racing	3	--	--	--	--	--	--	9
23	(Canada) Valiante R	(United States) Walker Racing	1	--	--	--	--	--	--	7
24	(Czech Republic) Janiš R	(United States) Dale Coyne Racing	1	--	--	--	--	--	--	3

== Bibliography ==
- Shaw, Jeremy, ed. (2005). The Autocourse Official Champ Car Yearbook 2004-2005. London: Crash Media Group. ISBN 978-1-905334-00-1.

== See also ==
- 2004 Toyota Atlantic Championship season
- 2004 Indianapolis 500
- 2004 IndyCar Series
- 2004 Infiniti Pro Series season
