= 2004 Bridgestone 400 =

Coordinates: 36.27134°N 115.01112°W

(United States) 2004 Las Vegas
Race details
- Race 12 of 14 in the 2004 Champ Car season
- Date: September 25, 2004
- Official name: Bridgestone 400 Presented by Corona
- Location: Las Vegas Motor Speedway; Las Vegas, Nevada, United States
- Course: 1.5 Mile Banked Oval; 1.500 mi / 2.414 km
- Distance: 166 laps 249.000 mi / 400.724 km
- Weather: Partly cloudy with temperatures hovering around 79.5 °F (26.4 °C) maximum wind speeds of 9.9 miles per hour (15.9 km/h) reported throughout the day

Pole position
- Driver: (Canada) Patrick Carpentier (Forsythe Championship Racing)
- Time: 26.190

Fastest lap
- Driver: (Brazil) Bruno Junqueira (Newman/Haas Racing)
- Time: 26.166 (on lap 72 of 166)

Podium
- First: (France) Sébastien Bourdais (Newman/Haas Racing)
- Second: (Brazil) Bruno Junqueira (Newman/Haas Racing)
- Third: (Canada) Patrick Carpentier (Forsythe Championship Racing)

The 2004 Bridgestone 400 was the twelfth round of the 2004 Bridgestone Presents the Champ Car World Series Powered by Ford season, held on September 25, 2004 at the Las Vegas Motor Speedway in Las Vegas, Nevada. Patrick Carpentier won the pole, the fifth and final pole of his Champ Car career. Sébastien Bourdais won the race.

== Qualifying results ==
Pos	Nat	Name	Team	Best Lap	Time
1	(Canada)	Patrick Carpentier	Forsythe Racing	2	26.190
2	(United States)	Jimmy Vasser	PKV Racing	2	26.278
3	(France)	Sébastien Bourdais	Newman/Haas Racing	1	26.300
4	(Brazil)	Bruno Junqueira	Newman/Haas Racing	2	26.310
5	(Mexico)	Michel Jourdain Jr.	RuSPORT	1	26.324
6	(Mexico)	Rodolfo Lavín	Forsythe Racing	2	26.339
7	(United States)	A. J. Allmendinger	RuSPORT	2	26.362
8	(United States)	Ryan Hunter-Reay	Herdez Competition	1	26.402
9	(Mexico)	Mario Domínguez	Herdez Competition	2	26.488
10	(Mexico)	Roberto González	PKV Racing	2	26.579
11	(Canada)	Paul Tracy	Forsythe Racing	1	26.644
12	(Canada)	Alex Tagliani	Rocketsports Racing	2	26.713
13	(France)	Nelson Philippe	Mi-Jack Conquest Racing	1	26.814
14	(United Kingdom)	Guy Smith	Rocketsports Racing	1	26.855
15	(United Kingdom)	Justin Wilson	Mi-Jack Conquest Racing	1	27.080
16	(Argentina)	Gastón Mazzacane	Dale Coyne Racing	2	27.082
17	(Brazil)	Mario Haberfeld	Walker Racing	2	27.232
18	(Spain)	Oriol Servià	Dale Coyne Racing	—	—

== Race ==
Pos	No	Driver	Team	Laps	Time/Retired	Grid	Points
1	2	(France) Sébastien Bourdais	Newman/Haas Racing	166	1:29:01.061	3	32
2	6	(Brazil) Bruno Junqueira	Newman/Haas Racing	166	+0.066 secs	4	29
3	7	(Canada) Patrick Carpentier	Forsythe Racing	166	+4.091 secs	1	27
4	3	(Mexico) Rodolfo Lavín	Forsythe Racing	166	+6.227 secs	6	23
5	12	(United States) Jimmy Vasser	PKV Racing	166	+6.302 secs	2	21
6	10	(United States) A. J. Allmendinger	RuSPORT	166	+6.938 secs	7	19
7	55	(Mexico) Mario Domínguez	Herdez Competition	166	+6.941 secs	9	17
8	34	(United Kingdom) Justin Wilson	Mi-Jack Conquest Racing	166	+7.310 secs	15	16
9	14	(France) Nelson Philippe	Mi-Jack Conquest Racing	166	+11.979 secs	13	13
10	21	(Mexico) Roberto González	PKV Racing	165	+ 1 Lap	10	11
11	9	(Mexico) Michel Jourdain Jr.	RuSPORT	165	+ 1 Lap	5	10
12	11	(Spain) Oriol Servià	Dale Coyne Racing	164	+ 2 Laps	18	10
13	4	(United States) Ryan Hunter-Reay	Herdez Competition	164	+ 2 Laps	8	8
14	5	(Brazil) Mario Haberfeld	Walker Racing	162	+ 4 Laps	17	7
15	19	(Argentina) Gastón Mazzacane	Dale Coyne Racing	160	+ 6 Laps	16	6
16	8	(Canada) Alex Tagliani	Rocketsports Racing	163	+ 3 Laps	12	5*
17	17	(United Kingdom) Guy Smith	Rocketsports Racing	123	Engine	14	4
18	1	(Canada) Paul Tracy	Forsythe Racing	0	Drive train	11	3

* Alex Tagliani was dropped from 14th to 16th in the final standings and lost his bonus point for leading a lap as a penalty for ignoring a black flag during the race.

== Caution flags ==
Laps	Cause
37-48	Hunter-Reay (4) spin/stall
49	Yellow restart
50	Yellow restart
125-133	Smith (17) stopped on course

== Notes ==
Laps	Leader
1-6	Patrick Carpentier
7-36	Bruno Junqueira
37-57	Alex Tagliani
58-74	Sébastien Bourdais
75-78	Oriol Servià
79-148	Sébastien Bourdais
149	Bruno Junqueira
150-157	Sébastien Bourdais
158-159	Bruno Junqueira
160	Sébastien Bourdais
161	Bruno Junqueira
162	Sébastien Bourdais
163	Bruno Junqueira
164-166	Sébastien Bourdais

Driver	Laps led
Sébastien Bourdais	100
Bruno Junqueira	35
Alex Tagliani	21
Patrick Carpentier	6
Oriol Servià	4

- New Race Lap Record Bruno Junqueira 26.166
- New Race Record Sébastien Bourdais 1:29:01.061
- Average Speed 167.832 mph

== Championship standings after the race ==
Drivers' Championship standings

	Pos	Driver	Points
	1	(France) Sébastien Bourdais	307
	2	(Brazil) Bruno Junqueira	280
1	3	(Canada) Patrick Carpentier	241
1	4	(Canada) Paul Tracy	218
	5	(Canada) Alex Tagliani	206

- Note: Only the top five positions are included.

Previous race: 2004 Bridgestone Grand Prix of Monterey	Champ Car World Series; 2004 season	Next race: 2004 Lexmark Indy 300
Previous race: 1984 Caesars Palace Grand Prix; Street Circuit	2004 Bridgestone 400	Next race: 2005 Hurricane Relief 400
