= 2004 Bridgestone Grand Prix of Monterey =

Champ Car auto racing event

Coordinates: 36°35′3.4″N 121°45′11.8″W

(United States) 2004 Laguna Seca
Race details
- Race 11 of 14 in the 2004 Champ Car season
- Laguna Seca Track Layout
- Date: September 12, 2004
- Official name: Bridgestone Grand Prix of Monterey
- Location: Mazda Raceway Laguna Seca, Monterey, California, United States
- Course: Permanent Road Course; 2.238 mi / 3.602 km
- Distance: 79 laps 176.802 mi / 284.558 km
- Weather: Cool and Clear

Pole position
- Driver: (France) Sébastien Bourdais (Newman/Haas Racing)
- Time: 1:09.358

Fastest lap
- Driver: (Mexico) Mario Domínguez (Herdez Competition)
- Time: 1:11.727 (on lap 78 of 79)

Podium
- First: (Canada) Patrick Carpentier (Forsythe Championship Racing)
- Second: (Brazil) Bruno Junqueira (Newman/Haas Racing)
- Third: (Spain) Oriol Servià (Dale Coyne Racing)

The 2004 Bridgestone Grand Prix of Monterey was the eleventh round of the 2004 Champ Car season, held on September 12, 2004 at Mazda Raceway Laguna Seca in Monterey, California. Sébastien Bourdais took the pole while Patrick Carpentier won the race, the fifth and final win of his Champ Car career. It was also the 22nd and final Champ Car event to take place at the Laguna Seca racetrack.

== Qualifying results ==
Pos	Nat	Name	Team	Qual 1	Qual 2	Best
1	(France)	Sébastien Bourdais	Newman/Haas Racing	1:10.130	1:09.358	1:09.358
2	(Canada)	Patrick Carpentier	Forsythe Racing	1:09.918	1:09.605	1:09.605
3	(Canada)	Paul Tracy	Forsythe Racing	1:10.214	1:09.515	1:09.515
4	(United States)	A. J. Allmendinger	RuSPORT	1:10.463	1:09.567	1:09.567
5	(Mexico)	Michel Jourdain Jr.	RuSPORT	1:10.776	1:09.714	1:09.714
6	(Canada)	Alex Tagliani	Rocketsports Racing	1:10.383	1:09.790	1:09.790
7	(United States)	Ryan Hunter-Reay	Herdez Competition	1:10.890	1:09.823	1:09.823
8	(Brazil)	Bruno Junqueira	Newman/Haas Racing	1:10.392	1:09.936	1:09.936
9	(United States)	Jimmy Vasser	PKV Racing	1:10.759	1:09.967	1:09.967
10	(Mexico)	Mario Domínguez	Herdez Competition	1:10.397	1:10.088	1:10.088
11	(Mexico)	Rodolfo Lavín	Forsythe Racing	1:10.809	1:10.606	1:10.606
12	(Spain)	Oriol Servià	Dale Coyne Racing	1:11.696	1:10.650	1:10.650
13	(Brazil)	Mario Haberfeld	Walker Racing	1:11.812	1:10.771	1:10.771
14	(United Kingdom)	Guy Smith	Rocketsports Racing	1:11.948	1:10.949	1:10.949
15	(United Kingdom)	Justin Wilson	Mi-Jack Conquest Racing	1:11.929	1:10.998	1:10.998
16	(France)	Nelson Philippe	Mi-Jack Conquest Racing	1:12.220	1:11.410	1:11.410
17	(Argentina)	Gastón Mazzacane	Dale Coyne Racing	1:12.121	1:11.740	1:11.740
18	(Mexico)	Roberto González	PKV Racing	1:11.885	—	1:11.885

== Race ==
Pos	No	Driver	Team	Laps	Time/Retired	Grid	Points
1	7	(Canada) Patrick Carpentier	Forsythe Racing	79	1:45:51.116	2	33
2	6	(Brazil) Bruno Junqueira	Newman/Haas Racing	79	+5.395 secs	8	27
3	11	(Spain) Oriol Servià	Dale Coyne Racing	79	+20.459 secs	12	26
4	9	(Mexico) Michel Jourdain Jr.	RuSPORT	79	+29.112 secs	5	24
5	4	(United States) Ryan Hunter-Reay	Herdez Competition	79	+29.715 secs	7	21
6	8	(Canada) Alex Tagliani	Rocketsports Racing	79	+30.431 secs	6	20
7	5	(Brazil) Mario Haberfeld	Walker Racing	79	+32.311 secs	13	17
8	2	(France) Sébastien Bourdais	Newman/Haas Racing	79	+34.467 secs	1	17
9	17	(United Kingdom) Guy Smith	Rocketsports Racing	79	+45.934 secs	14	13
10	1	(Canada) Paul Tracy	Forsythe Racing	79	+49.222 secs	3	12
11	55	(Mexico) Mario Domínguez	Herdez Competition	78	+ 1 Lap	10	11
12	3	(Mexico) Rodolfo Lavín	Forsythe Racing	77	+ 2 Laps	11	9
13	19	(Argentina) Gastón Mazzacane	Dale Coyne Racing	75	+ 4 Laps	17	8
14	21	(Mexico) Roberto González	PKV Racing	52	Out of fuel	18	7
15	10	(United States) A. J. Allmendinger	RuSPORT	43	Contact	4	6
16	14	(France) Nelson Philippe	Mi-Jack Conquest Racing	11	Contact	16	5
17	12	(United States) Jimmy Vasser	PKV Racing	10	Gearbox	9	4
18	34	(United Kingdom) Justin Wilson	Mi-Jack Conquest Racing	1	Contact	15	3

== Caution flags ==
Laps	Cause
8-10	Domínguez (55) contact
12-16	Mazzacane (19) spin/stall; Philippe (14) contact
55-57	González (21) stopped on course

== Notes ==
Laps	Leader
1	Sébastien Bourdais
2-28	Paul Tracy
29	Patrick Carpentier
30-36	Alex Tagliani
37-40	Michel Jourdain Jr.
41-79	Patrick Carpentier

Driver	Laps led
Patrick Carpentier	40
Paul Tracy	27
Alex Tagliani	7
Michel Jourdain Jr.	4
Sébastien Bourdais	1

- New Race Record Patrick Carpentier 1:45:51.116
- Average Speed 100.217 mph

== Championship standings after the race ==
Drivers' Championship standings

	Pos	Driver	Points
	1	(France) Sébastien Bourdais	275
	2	(Brazil) Bruno Junqueira	251
	3	(Canada) Paul Tracy	215
1	4	(Canada) Patrick Carpentier	214
1	5	(Canada) Alex Tagliani	201

- Note: Only the top five positions are included.

Previous race: 2004 Molson Indy Montreal	Champ Car World Series; 2004 season	Next race: 2004 Bridgestone 400
Previous race: 2003 Grand Prix of Monterey	2004 Bridgestone Grand Prix of Monterey	Next race: Final Event; Event replaced with 2005 San Jose Grand Prix
