= 2004 Centrix Financial Grand Prix of Denver =

Coordinates: 39°44′48″N 105°0′23″W

(United States) 2004 Denver
Race details
- Race 9 of 14 in the 2004 Champ Car season
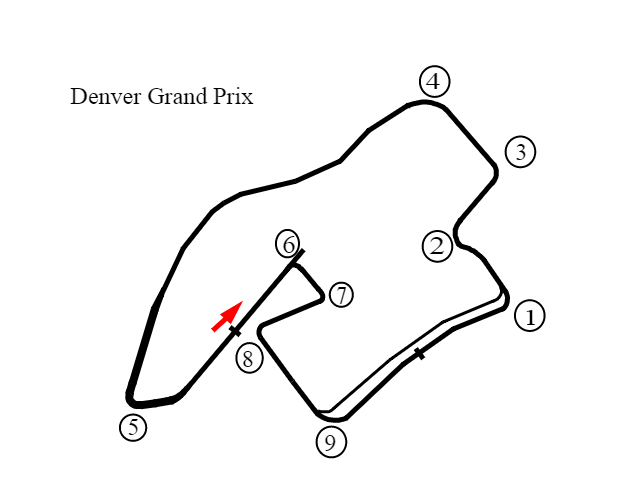
- Date: August 15, 2004
- Official name: Centrix Financial Grand Prix of Denver
- Location: Streets of Denver; Denver, Colorado, United States
- Course: Temporary Street Course; 1.647 mi / 2.651 km
- Distance: 90 laps 148.230 mi / 238.590 km
- Weather: Scattered clouds with temperatures reaching up to 84 °F (29 °C); wind speeds approaching 15.9 miles per hour (25.6 km/h)

Pole position
- Driver: (France) Sébastien Bourdais (Newman/Haas Racing)
- Time: 59.942

Fastest lap
- Driver: (France) Sébastien Bourdais (Newman/Haas Racing)
- Time: 1:01.256 (on lap 89 of 90)

Podium
- First: (France) Sébastien Bourdais (Newman/Haas Racing)
- Second: (Canada) Paul Tracy (Forsythe Championship Racing)
- Third: (Brazil) Bruno Junqueira (Newman/Haas Racing)

The 2004 Centrix Financial Grand Prix of Denver was the ninth round of the 2004 Bridgestone Presents the Champ Car World Series Powered by Ford season, held on August 15, 2004 on the streets of Denver, Colorado near the Pepsi Center. Sébastien Bourdais swept the pole and the race win.

== Qualifying results ==
Pos	Nat	Name	Team	Qual 1	Qual 2	Best
1	(France)	Sébastien Bourdais	Newman/Haas Racing	1:00.413	59.942	59.942
2	(Brazil)	Bruno Junqueira	Newman/Haas Racing	1:01.203	1:00.525	1:00.525
3	(Canada)	Paul Tracy	Forsythe Racing	1:00.885	1:00.588	1:00.588
4	(Canada)	Patrick Carpentier	Forsythe Racing	1:01.416	1:00.595	1:00.595
5	(Mexico)	Mario Domínguez	Herdez Competition	1:00.721	—	1:00.721
6	(Spain)	Oriol Servià	Dale Coyne Racing	1:02.046	1:00.813	1:00.813
7	(United States)	A. J. Allmendinger	RuSPORT	—	1:00.907	1:00.907
8	(United States)	Ryan Hunter-Reay	Herdez Competition	1:01.545	1:01.072	1:01.072
9	(Brazil)	Mario Haberfeld	Walker Racing	1:01.198	1:01.285	1:01.198
10	(United Kingdom)	Justin Wilson	Mi-Jack Conquest Racing	1:01.782	1:01.265	1:01.265
11	(Canada)	Alex Tagliani	Rocketsports Racing	1:01.757	1:01.266	1:01.266
12	(United States)	Jimmy Vasser	PKV Racing	1:01.334	1:02.090	1:01.334
13	(Mexico)	Michel Jourdain Jr.	RuSPORT	1:01.447	1:01.345	1:01.345
14	(France)	Nelson Philippe	Mi-Jack Conquest Racing	1:02.354	1:01.522	1:01.522
15	(Mexico)	Rodolfo Lavín	Forsythe Racing	1:02.130	1:01.794	1:01.794
16	(United Kingdom)	Guy Smith	Rocketsports Racing	1:02.113	1:02.137	1:02.113
17	(Argentina)	Gastón Mazzacane	Dale Coyne Racing	1:02.412	—	1:02.412
18	(Mexico)	Roberto González	PKV Racing	1:02.604	1:02.507	1:02.507

== Race ==
Pos	No	Driver	Team	Laps	Time/Retired	Grid	Points
1	2	(France) Sébastien Bourdais	Newman/Haas Racing	90	1:40:25.232	1	35
2	1	(Canada) Paul Tracy	Forsythe Racing	90	+7.446 secs	3	28
3	6	(Brazil) Bruno Junqueira	Newman/Haas Racing	90	+8.171 secs	2	26
4	55	(Mexico) Mario Domínguez	Herdez Competition	90	+8.561 secs	5	23
5	10	(United States) A. J. Allmendinger	RuSPORT	90	+15.641 secs	7	21
6	11	(Spain) Oriol Servià	Dale Coyne Racing	90	+19.256 secs	6	19
7	34	(United Kingdom) Justin Wilson	Mi-Jack Conquest Racing	90	+20.786 secs	10	17
8	5	(Brazil) Mario Haberfeld	Walker Racing	90	+24.141 secs	9	15
9	7	(Canada) Patrick Carpentier	Forsythe Racing	90	+25.371 secs	4	13
10	8	(Canada) Alex Tagliani	Rocketsports Racing	89	+ 1 Lap	11	11
11	3	(Mexico) Rodolfo Lavín	Forsythe Racing	88	+ 2 Laps	15	10
12	21	(Mexico) Roberto González	PKV Racing	88	+ 2 Laps	18	10
13	14	(France) Nelson Philippe	Mi-Jack Conquest Racing	87	+ 3 Laps	14	8
14	9	(Mexico) Michel Jourdain Jr.	RuSPORT	86	+ 4 Laps	13	7
15	19	(Argentina) Gastón Mazzacane	Dale Coyne Racing	86	+ 4 Laps	17	6
16	4	(United States) Ryan Hunter-Reay	Herdez Competition	72	Contact	8	5
17	12	(United States) Jimmy Vasser	PKV Racing	63	Engine	12	4
18	17	(United Kingdom) Guy Smith	Rocketsports Racing	56	Electrical	16	3

== Caution flags ==
Laps	Cause
1-4	Lavín (3), Bourdais (2), Tagliani (8) & Philippe (14) contact
74-78	Hunter-Reay (4) spin/stall

== Notes ==
Laps	Leader
1-39	Bruno Junqueira
40-79	Paul Tracy
80-90	Sébastien Bourdais

Driver	Laps led
Paul Tracy	40
Bruno Junqueira	39
Sébastien Bourdais	11

- New Track Record Sébastien Bourdais 59.942 (Qualification Session #2)
- New Race Lap Record Sébastien Bourdais 1:01.256
- New Race Record Sébastien Bourdais 1:40:25.232
- Average Speed 89.103 mph

== Championship standings after the race ==
Drivers' Championship standings

	Pos	Driver	Points
	1	(France) Sébastien Bourdais	248
	2	(Brazil) Bruno Junqueira	192
1	3	(Canada) Paul Tracy	180
1	4	(Canada) Alex Tagliani	164
	5	(Canada) Patrick Carpentier	154

- Note: Only the top five positions are included.

Previous race: 2004 Grand Prix of Road America	Champ Car World Series; 2004 season	Next race: 2004 Molson Indy Montreal
Previous race: 2003 Centrix Financial Grand Prix of Denver	2004 Centrix Financial Grand Prix of Denver	Next race: 2005 Centrix Financial Grand Prix of Denver
