= 2004 Molson Indy Montreal =

Coordinates: 45°30′2.08″N 73°31′20.86″W

(Canada) 2004 Montreal
Race details
- Race 10 of 14 in the 2004 Champ Car season
- Circuit Gilles Villeneuve Track Layout
- Date: August 29, 2004
- Official name: Molson Indy Montreal
- Location: Circuit Gilles Villeneuve; Montreal, Quebec, Canada
- Course: Permanent Road Course; 2.709 mi / 4.360 km
- Distance: 69 laps 186.921 mi / 300.840 km
- Weather: Cloudy with temperatures reaching up to 28.9 °C (84.0 °F); maximum wind speeds of 6 kilometres per hour (3.7 mph) reported throughout the day

Pole position
- Driver: (France) Sébastien Bourdais (Newman/Haas Racing)
- Time: 1:19.897

Fastest lap
- Driver: (France) Sébastien Bourdais (Newman/Haas Racing)
- Time: 1:20.840 (on lap 40 of 69)

Podium
- First: (Brazil) Bruno Junqueira (Newman/Haas Racing)
- Second: (Canada) Patrick Carpentier (Forsythe Championship Racing)
- Third: (Mexico) Mario Domínguez (Herdez Competition)

The 2004 Molson Indy Montreal was the tenth round of the 2004 Bridgestone Presents the Champ Car World Series Powered by Ford season, held on August 29, 2004, at Circuit Gilles Villeneuve in Montreal, Quebec. Sébastien Bourdais took the pole and his teammate Bruno Junqueira won the race.

== Qualifying results ==
Pos	Nat	Name	Team	Qual 1	Qual 2	Best
1	(France)	Sébastien Bourdais	Newman/Haas Racing	1:21.695	1:19.897	1:19.897
2	(United States)	A. J. Allmendinger	RuSPORT	1:22.229	1:20.272	1:20.272
3	(Mexico)	Mario Domínguez	Herdez Competition	1:22.056	1:20.316	1:20.316
4	(Brazil)	Bruno Junqueira	Newman/Haas Racing	1:22.169	1:20.458	1:20.458
5	(Canada)	Paul Tracy	Forsythe Racing	1:22.613	1:20.803	1:20.803
6	(Canada)	Patrick Carpentier	Forsythe Racing	—	1:20.836	1:20.836
7	(Canada)	Alex Tagliani	Rocketsports Racing	1:21.791	1:20.889	1:20.889
8	(United Kingdom)	Justin Wilson	Mi-Jack Conquest Racing	1:22.785	1:21.088	1:21.088
9	(United States)	Ryan Hunter-Reay	Herdez Competition	1:22.344	1:21.129	1:21.129
10	(Spain)	Oriol Servià	Dale Coyne Racing	1:22.888	1:21.172	1:21.172
11	(United States)	Jimmy Vasser	PKV Racing	1:22.620	1:21.283	1:21.283
12	(Mexico)	Michel Jourdain Jr.	RuSPORT	1:22.862	1:21.291	1:21.291
13	(France)	Nelson Philippe	Mi-Jack Conquest Racing	1:23.554	1:21.496	1:21.496
14	(Mexico)	Rodolfo Lavín	Forsythe Racing	1:23.890	1:21.622	1:21.622
15	(Mexico)	Roberto González	PKV Racing	—	1:22.012	1:22.012
16	(United Kingdom)	Guy Smith	Rocketsports Racing	—	1:22.093	1:22.093
17	(Brazil)	Mario Haberfeld	Walker Racing	1:23.310	1:22.508	1:22.508
18	(Argentina)	Gastón Mazzacane	Dale Coyne Racing	1:24.654	1:23.863	1:23.863

== Race ==
Pos	No	Driver	Team	Laps	Time/Retired	Grid	Points
1	6	(Brazil) Bruno Junqueira	Newman/Haas Racing	69	1:39:12.432	4	32
2	7	(Canada) Patrick Carpentier	Forsythe Racing	69	+6.382 secs	6	27
3	55	(Mexico) Mario Domínguez	Herdez Competition	69	+11.142 secs	3	26
4	1	(Canada) Paul Tracy	Forsythe Racing	69	+16.874 secs	5	23
5	10	(United States) A. J. Allmendinger	RuSPORT	69	+17.561 secs	2	22
6	9	(Mexico) Michel Jourdain Jr.	RuSPORT	69	+32.256 secs	12	20
7	8	(Canada) Alex Tagliani	Rocketsports Racing	69	+32.300 secs	7	17
8	12	(United States) Jimmy Vasser	PKV Racing	69	+34.097 secs	11	15
9	11	(Spain) Oriol Servià	Dale Coyne Racing	69	+42.654 secs	10	13
10	21	(Mexico) Roberto González	PKV Racing	69	+1:09.190	15	11
11	3	(Mexico) Rodolfo Lavín	Forsythe Racing	69	+1:18.083	14	10
12	19	(Argentina) Gastón Mazzacane	Dale Coyne Racing	67	+ 2 Laps	18	9
13	5	(Brazil) Mario Haberfeld	Walker Racing	65	+ 4 Laps	17	8
14	34	(United Kingdom) Justin Wilson	Mi-Jack Conquest Racing	55	Gearbox	8	7
15	2	(France) Sébastien Bourdais	Newman/Haas Racing	42	Contact	1	10
16	17	(United Kingdom) Guy Smith	Rocketsports Racing	27	Engine	16	5
17	14	(France) Nelson Philippe	Mi-Jack Conquest Racing	21	Lost wheel	13	4
18	4	(United States) Ryan Hunter-Reay	Herdez Competition	5	Contact	9	3

== Caution flags ==
Laps	Cause
6-9	Hunter-Reay (4) contact

== Notes ==
Laps	Leader
1-20	Sébastien Bourdais
21-27	A. J. Allmendinger
28-35	Mario Domínguez
36-41	Sébastien Bourdais
42-44	A. J. Allmendinger
45-69	Bruno Junqueira

Driver	Laps led
Sébastien Bourdais	26
Bruno Junqueira	25
A. J. Allmendinger	10
Mario Domínguez	8

- New Race Record Bruno Junqueira 1:39:12.432
- Average Speed 113.049 mph

== Championship standings after the race ==
Drivers' Championship standings

Pos	Driver	Points
1	(France) Sébastien Bourdais	258
2	(Brazil) Bruno Junqueira	224
3	(Canada) Paul Tracy	203
4	(Canada) Alex Tagliani	181
5	(Canada) Patrick Carpentier	181

- Note: Only the top five positions are included.

Previous race: 2004 Centrix Financial Grand Prix of Denver	Champ Car World Series; 2004 season	Next race: 2004 Bridgestone Grand Prix of Monterey
Previous race: 2003 Molson Indy Montreal	2004 Molson Indy Montreal	Next race: 2005 Molson Indy Montreal
