= 2004 Lexmark Indy 300 =

Coordinates: 27°59′17.9″S 153°25′42.1″E

(Australia) 2004 Surfers Paradise
Race details
- Race 13 of 14 in the 2004 Champ Car season
- Track map of the Surfers Paradise street circuit at Surfers Paradise, Australia.
- Date: October 24, 2004
- Official name: Lexmark Indy 300
- Location: Surfers Paradise Street Circuit; Queensland, Australia
- Course: Temporary Street Circuit; 2.795 mi / 4.498 km
- Distance: 57 laps 159.315 mi / 256.386 km
- Weather: Warm with temperatures reaching up to 27.7 °C (81.9 °F)

Pole position
- Driver: (Canada) Paul Tracy (Forsythe Championship Racing)
- Time: 1:33.556

Fastest lap
- Driver: (Brazil) Bruno Junqueira (Newman/Haas Racing)
- Time: 1:34.017 (on lap 49 of 57)

Podium
- First: (Brazil) Bruno Junqueira (Newman/Haas Racing)
- Second: (France) Sébastien Bourdais (Newman/Haas Racing)
- Third: (Mexico) Mario Domínguez (Herdez Competition)

The 2004 Lexmark Indy 300 was the thirteenth and penultimate round of the 2004 Bridgestone Presents the Champ Car World Series Powered by Ford season, held on October 24, 2004 on the Surfers Paradise Street Circuit, Queensland, Australia. Paul Tracy won the pole and Bruno Junqueira won the race.

== Qualifying results ==
Pos	Nat	Name	Team	Chassis	Qual 1	Qual 2	Best
1	(Canada)	Paul Tracy	Forsythe Racing	Lola B2/00 Ford-Cosworth	1:34.557	1:33.556	1:33.556
2	(France)	Sébastien Bourdais	Newman/Haas Racing	Lola B2/00 Ford-Cosworth	1:34.439	1:33.765	1:33.765
3	(Brazil)	Bruno Junqueira	Newman/Haas Racing	Lola B2/00 Ford-Cosworth	1:38.487	1:33.737	1:33.737
4	(United States)	A. J. Allmendinger	RuSPORT	Lola B2/00 Ford-Cosworth	1:35.254	1:33.867	1:33.867
5	(Mexico)	Mario Domínguez	Herdez Competition	Lola B2/00 Ford-Cosworth	1:34.601	1:34.076	1:34.076
6	(United States)	Ryan Hunter-Reay	Herdez Competition	Lola B2/00 Ford-Cosworth	1:35.224	1:34.585	1:34.585
7	(United Kingdom)	Justin Wilson	Mi-Jack Conquest Racing	Lola B2/00 Ford-Cosworth	1:35.947	1:34.611	1:34.611
8	(United States)	Jimmy Vasser	PKV Racing	Lola B2/00 Ford-Cosworth	1:34.913	1:35.549	1:34.913
9	(Mexico)	Michel Jourdain Jr.	RuSPORT	Lola B2/00 Ford-Cosworth	1:35.233	1:35.115	1:35.115
10	(Canada)	Alex Tagliani	Rocketsports Racing	Lola B2/00 Ford-Cosworth	1:35.258	1:35.452	1:35.258
11	(Canada)	Patrick Carpentier	Forsythe Racing	Lola B2/00 Ford-Cosworth	1:40.778	1:35.261	1:35.261
12	(Mexico)	Rodolfo Lavín	Forsythe Racing	Lola B2/00 Ford-Cosworth	1:37.385	1:35.267	1:35.267
13	(Brazil)	Mario Haberfeld	Walker Racing	Reynard 02i Ford-Cosworth	1:36.188	1:35.374	1:35.374
14	(France)	Nelson Philippe	Mi-Jack Conquest Racing	Lola B2/00 Ford-Cosworth	1:38.306	1:35.797	1:35.797
15	(Mexico)	Roberto González	PKV Racing	Lola B2/00 Ford-Cosworth	1:37.649	1:35.967	1:35.967
16	(Czech Republic)	Jarek Janiš	Dale Coyne Racing	Lola B2/00 Ford-Cosworth	1:38.534	1:36.642	1:36.642
17	(Australia)	David Besnard	Walker Racing	Reynard 02i Ford-Cosworth	1:37.497	1:36.854	1:36.854
18	(United Kingdom)	Guy Smith	Rocketsports Racing	Lola B2/00 Ford-Cosworth	1:38.897	1:36.943	1:36.943
19	(Spain)	Oriol Servià	Dale Coyne Racing	Lola B2/00 Ford-Cosworth	1:34.715	—	—*

* Oriol Servià's time from Qualification Session #1 was forfeited after he switched to his backup car for the race.

== Race ==
Pos	No	Driver	Team	Laps	Time/retired	Grid	Points
1	6	(Brazil) Bruno Junqueira	Newman/Haas Racing	57	1:46:45.941	3	33
2	2	(France) Sébastien Bourdais	Newman/Haas Racing	57	+1.199 secs	2	28
3	55	(Mexico) Mario Domínguez	Herdez Competition	57	+1.363 secs	5	25
4	1	(Canada) Paul Tracy	Forsythe Racing	57	+1.916 secs	1	25
5	4	(United States) Ryan Hunter-Reay	Herdez Competition	57	+2.080 secs	6	21
6	10	(United States) A. J. Allmendinger	RuSPORT	57	+2.741 secs	4	20
7	15	(Australia) David Besnard	Walker Racing	57	+16.110 secs	17	18
8	34	(United Kingdom) Justin Wilson	Mi-Jack Conquest Racing	57	+16.775 secs	7	15
9	17	(United Kingdom) Guy Smith	Rocketsports Racing	57	+17.426 secs	18	13
10	14	(France) Nelson Philippe	Mi-Jack Conquest Racing	57	+18.205 secs	14	11
11	21	(Mexico) Roberto González	PKV Racing	57	+19.368 secs	15	10
12	12	(United States) Jimmy Vasser	PKV Racing	57	+21.504 secs	8	9
13	11	(Spain) Oriol Servià	Dale Coyne Racing	57	+24.373 secs	19	8
14	5	(Brazil) Mario Haberfeld	Walker Racing	56	+ 1 Lap	13	7
15	3	(Mexico) Rodolfo Lavín	Forsythe Racing	54	+ 3 Laps	12	6
16	7	(Canada) Patrick Carpentier	Forsythe Racing	52	Crash	11	6
17	9	(Mexico) Michel Jourdain Jr.	RuSPORT	31	Crash	9	4
18	19	(Czech Republic) Jarek Janiš	Dale Coyne Racing	28	Gearbox	16	3
19	8	(Canada) Alex Tagliani	Rocketsports Racing	19	Crash	10	2

== Caution flags ==
Laps	Cause
0-1	Yellow start
15-16	Debris on course
16-18	Lavín (3) spun
31-34	Haberfeld (5) spun; Jourdain (9) contact
53-57	Carpentier (7) Huge Crash

== Notes ==
Laps	Leader
1-31	Paul Tracy
32-37	A. J. Allmendinger
38-39	Patrick Carpentier
40-57	Bruno Junqueira

Driver	Laps led
Paul Tracy	31
Bruno Junqueira	18
A. J. Allmendinger	6
Patrick Carpentier	2

- New Race Record Bruno Junqueira 1:46:45.941
- Average Speed 89.532 mph

== Championship standings after the race ==
Drivers' Championship standings

	Pos	Driver	Points
	1	(France) Sébastien Bourdais	335
	2	(Brazil) Bruno Junqueira	313
	3	(Canada) Patrick Carpentier	247
	4	(Canada) Paul Tracy	243
1	5	(Mexico) Mario Domínguez	228

- Note: Only the top five positions are included.

Previous race: 2004 Bridgestone 400	Champ Car World Series; 2004 season	Next race: 2004 Gran Premio Telmex/Tecate
Previous race: 2003 Lexmark Indy 300	2004 Lexmark Indy 300	Next race: 2005 Lexmark Indy 300
