= 2004 Gran Premio Telmex/Tecate =

Coordinates: 19°24′22″N 99°5′33″W

2004 Mexico City
Race details
- Race 14 of 14 in the 2004 Champ Car season
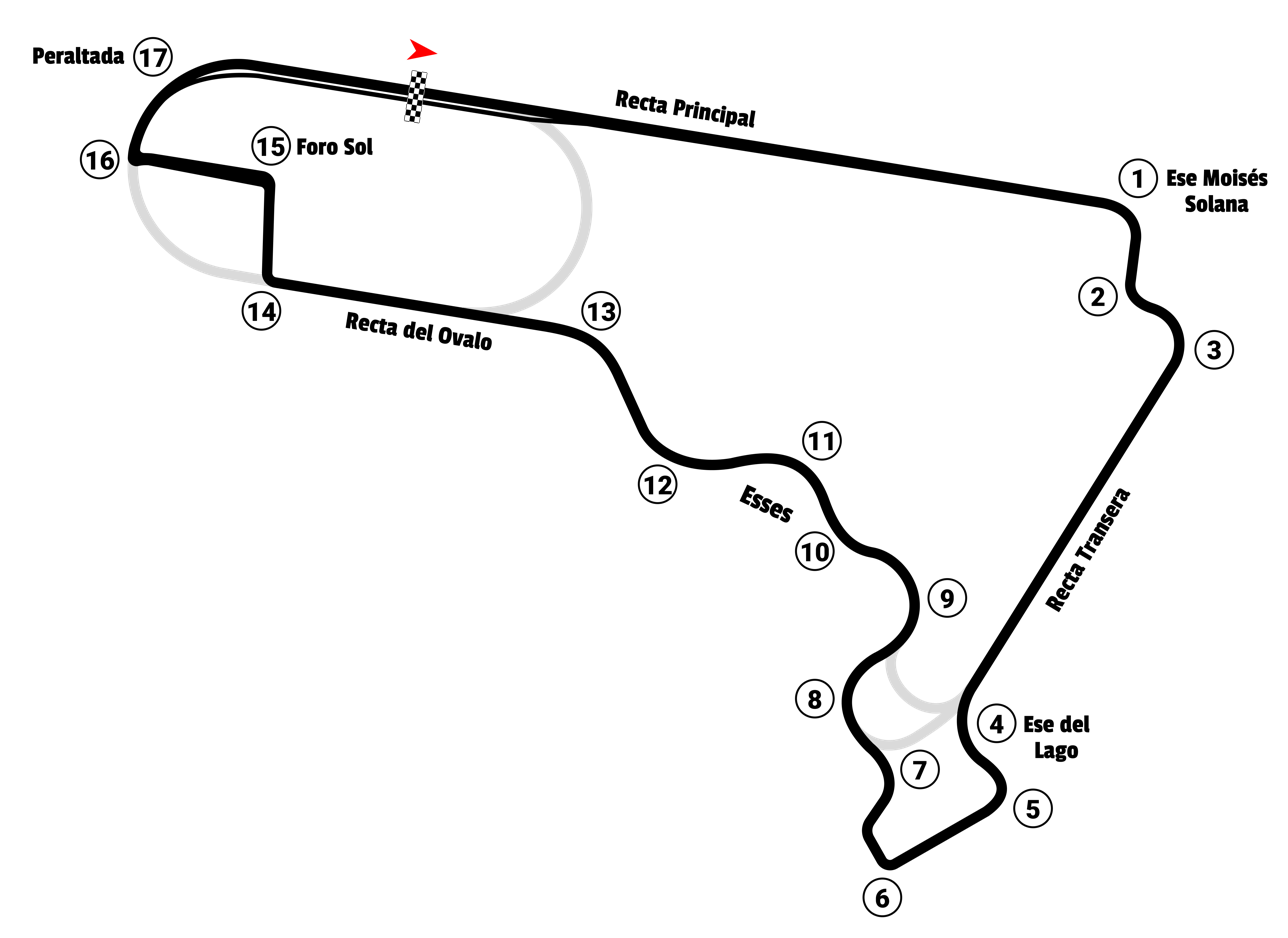
- Autódromo Hermanos Rodríguez Track Layout
- Date: November 7, 2004
- Official name: Gran Premio Telmex/Tecate presented by Banamex
- Location: Autódromo Hermanos Rodríguez; Mexico City, Mexico
- Course: Permanent Road Course; 2.786 mi / 4.484 km
- Distance: 63 laps 175.518 mi / 282.492 km

Pole position
- Driver: (France) Sébastien Bourdais (Newman/Haas Racing)
- Time: 1:25.919

Fastest lap
- Driver: (France) Sébastien Bourdais (Newman/Haas Racing)
- Time: 1:28.794 (on lap 25 of 63)

Podium
- First: (France) Sébastien Bourdais (Newman/Haas Racing)
- Second: (Brazil) Bruno Junqueira (Newman/Haas Racing)
- Third: (United States) A. J. Allmendinger (RuSPORT)

The 2004 Gran Premio Telmex/Tecate was the fourteenth and final round of the 2004 Bridgestone Presents the Champ Car World Series Powered by Ford season, held on November 7, 2004, at the Autódromo Hermanos Rodríguez in Mexico City, Mexico. Sébastien Bourdais won the pole and the race and in doing so also secured his first of four Champ Car titles.

== Qualifying results ==
Pos	Nat	Name	Team	Qual 1	Qual 2	Best
1	(France)	Sébastien Bourdais	Newman/Haas Racing	1:27.822	1:25.919	1:25.919
2	(Brazil)	Bruno Junqueira	Newman/Haas Racing	1:27.565	1:26.545	1:26.545
3	(United Kingdom)	Justin Wilson	Mi-Jack Conquest Racing	1:27.870	1:27.016	1:27.016
4	(United States)	Jimmy Vasser	PKV Racing	1:29.303	1:27.038	1:27.038
5	(Spain)	Oriol Servià	Dale Coyne Racing	1:28.460	1:27.114	1:27.114
6	(Canada)	Paul Tracy	Forsythe Racing	1:27.971	1:27.172	1:27.172
7	(United States)	A. J. Allmendinger	RuSPORT	1:27.858	1:27.205	1:27.205
8	(Canada)	Patrick Carpentier	Forsythe Racing	1:28.583	1:27.338	1:27.338
9	(United States)	Ryan Hunter-Reay	Herdez Competition	1:28.372	1:27.432	1:27.432
10	(Mexico)	Michel Jourdain Jr.	RuSPORT	1:28.401	1:27.537	1:27.537
11	(Mexico)	Roberto González	PKV Racing	1:28.106	1:27.610	1:27.610
12	(Canada)	Michael Valiante	Walker Racing	1:30.473	1:27.642	1:27.642
13	(Canada)	Alex Tagliani	Rocketsports Racing	1:28.278	1:27.841	1:27.841
14	(Mexico)	Rodolfo Lavín	Forsythe Racing	1:29.353	1:27.886	1:27.886
15	(Mexico)	Mario Domínguez	Herdez Competition	1:28.737	1:27.892	1:27.892
16	(Brazil)	Tarso Marques	Dale Coyne Racing	1:29.024	1:27.976	1:27.976
17	(Brazil)	Mario Haberfeld	Walker Racing	1:30.708	1:28.200	1:28.200
18	(United Kingdom)	Guy Smith	Rocketsports Racing	1:31.423	1:28.804	1:28.804
19	(France)	Nelson Philippe	Mi-Jack Conquest Racing	1:29.059	1:31.531	1:29.059

== Race ==
Pos	No	Driver	Team	Laps	Time/Retired	Grid	Points
1	2	(France) Sébastien Bourdais	Newman/Haas Racing	63	1:39:02.662	1	34
2	6	(Brazil) Bruno Junqueira	Newman/Haas Racing	63	+4.604 secs	2	28
3	10	(United States) A. J. Allmendinger	RuSPORT	63	+6.780 secs	7	25
4	34	(United Kingdom) Justin Wilson	Mi-Jack Conquest Racing	63	+7.902 secs	3	23
5	12	(United States) Jimmy Vasser	PKV Racing	63	+17.081 secs	4	21
6	7	(Canada) Patrick Carpentier	Forsythe Racing	63	+57.788 secs	8	19
7	11	(Spain) Oriol Servià	Dale Coyne Racing	63	+1:21.101	5	17
8	55	(Mexico) Mario Domínguez	Herdez Competition	63	+1:22.727	15	16
9	9	(Mexico) Michel Jourdain Jr.	RuSPORT	63	+1:31.899	10	13
10	1	(Canada) Paul Tracy	Forsythe Racing	62	+ 1 Lap	6	11
11	8	(Canada) Alex Tagliani	Rocketsports Racing	62	+ 1 Lap	13	10
12	21	(Mexico) Roberto González	PKV Racing	62	+ 1 Lap	11	9
13	3	(Mexico) Rodolfo Lavín	Forsythe Racing	62	+ 1 Lap	14	8
14	15	(Canada) Michael Valiante	Walker Racing	62	+ 1 Lap	12	7
15	5	(Brazil) Mario Haberfeld	Walker Racing	62	+ 1 Lap	17	6
16	14	(France) Nelson Philippe	Mi-Jack Conquest Racing	62	+ 1 Lap	19	5
17	17	(United Kingdom) Guy Smith	Rocketsports Racing	62	+ 1 Lap	18	4
18	19	(Brazil) Tarso Marques	Dale Coyne Racing	60	+ 3 Laps	16	3
19	4	(United States) Ryan Hunter-Reay	Herdez Competition	58	+ 5 Laps	9	2

== Caution flags ==
Laps	Cause
3-4	González (21) spin/stall
5	Yellow restart - Junqueira (6)

== Notes ==
Laps / Leader; 1-63 / Sébastien Bourdais	Driver / Laps led; Sébastien Bourdais / 63

- New Track Record Sébastien Bourdais 1:25.919 (Qualification Session #2)
- New Race Record Sébastien Bourdais 1:39:02.662
- Average Speed 106.327 mph

== Final championship standings ==
- **Bold** indicates the Season Champion.

Drivers' Championship standings

Pos	Driver	Points
1	(France) **Sébastien Bourdais**	369
2	(Brazil) Bruno Junqueira	341
3	(Canada) Patrick Carpentier	266
4	(Canada) Paul Tracy	254
5	(Mexico) Mario Domínguez	244

- Note: Only the top five positions are included.

Previous race: 2004 Lexmark Indy 300	Champ Car World Series; 2004 season	Next race: 2005 Toyota Grand Prix of Long Beach; Next Season
Previous race: 2003 Gran Premio Telmex-Gigante	2004 Gran Premio Telmex/Tecate	Next race: 2005 Gran Premio Telmex/Tecate
