= 2005 Toyota Grand Prix of Long Beach =

Coordinates: 33°45′59″N 118°11′34″W

(United States) 2005 Long Beach
Race details
- Race 1 of 13 in the 2005 Champ Car season
- Long Beach Track Layout
- Date: April 10, 2005
- Official name: Toyota Grand Prix of Long Beach
- Location: Long Beach Street Circuit, California, United States
- Course: Temporary street circuit 1.968 mi / 3.167 km
- Distance: 81 laps 159.408 mi / 256.527 km
- Weather: Sunny

Pole position
- Driver: (Canada) Paul Tracy (Forsythe Championship Racing)
- Time: 1:07.485

Fastest lap
- Driver: (France) Sébastien Bourdais (Newman/Haas Racing)
- Time: 1:09.171 (on lap 69 of 81)

Podium
- First: (France) Sébastien Bourdais (Newman/Haas Racing)
- Second: (Canada) Paul Tracy (Forsythe Championship Racing)
- Third: (Brazil) Bruno Junqueira (Newman/Haas Racing)

Chronology
Previous	Next
2004	2006

The 2005 Toyota Grand Prix of Long Beach was the first round of the 2005 Bridgestone Presents the Champ Car World Series Powered by Ford season, held on April 10, 2005, on the streets of Long Beach, California. Paul Tracy was the polesitter and the race winner was Sébastien Bourdais.

== Qualifying results ==
Pos	Nat	Name	Team	Qual 1	Qual 2	Best
1	(Canada)	Paul Tracy	Forsythe Racing	1:08.494	1:07.485	1:07.485
2	(Brazil)	Bruno Junqueira	Newman/Haas Racing	1:08.342	1:07.644	1:07.644
3	(Mexico)	Mario Domínguez	Forsythe Racing	1:09.058	1:07.803	1:07.803
4	(France)	Sébastien Bourdais	Newman/Haas Racing	1:08.736	1:07.821	1:07.821
5	(United Kingdom)	Justin Wilson	RuSPORT	1:08.884	1:07.919	1:07.919
6	(Germany)	Timo Glock	Rocketsports Racing	1:09.713	1:08.274	1:08.274
7	(Canada)	Alex Tagliani	Team Australia	1:09.056	1:08.466	1:08.466
8	(Brazil)	Cristiano da Matta	PKV Racing	1:09.626	1:08.493	1:08.493
9	(Denmark)	Ronnie Bremer	HVM Racing	1:09.514	1:08.613	1:08.613
10	(United States)	A. J. Allmendinger	RuSPORT	1:09.425	1:08.638	1:08.638
11	(United States)	Jimmy Vasser	PKV Racing	1:09.793	1:08.770	1:08.770
12	(United States)	Ryan Hunter-Reay	Rocketsports Racing	1:09.852	1:08.792	1:08.792
13	(Sweden)	Björn Wirdheim	HVM Racing	1:09.619	1:08.834	1:08.834
14	(Spain)	Oriol Servià	Dale Coyne Racing	1:10.067	1:08.928	1:08.928
15	(France)	Nelson Philippe	Mi-Jack Conquest Racing	1:10.193	1:09.334	1:09.334
16	(Canada)	Andrew Ranger	Mi-Jack Conquest Racing	1:09.416	1:09.416	1:09.416
17	(Australia)	Marcus Marshall	Team Australia	1:11.137	1:09.784	1:09.784
18	(Brazil)	Ricardo Sperafico	Dale Coyne Racing	1:10.844	1:09.879	1:09.879
19	(Italy)	Fabrizio del Monte	Jensen Motorsports	1:13.501	1:11.723	1:11.723

== Race ==
Pos	No	Driver	Team	Laps	Time/Retired	Grid	Points
1	1	(France) Sébastien Bourdais	Newman/Haas Racing	81	1:46:29.768	4	34
2	3	(Canada) Paul Tracy	Forsythe Racing	81	+4.138 secs	1	29
3	2	(Brazil) Bruno Junqueira	Newman/Haas Racing	81	+5.447 secs	2	27
4	9	(United Kingdom) Justin Wilson	RuSPORT	81	+6.271 secs	5	24
5	7	(Mexico) Mario Domínguez	Forsythe Racing	81	+7.917 secs	3	22
6	8	(Germany) Timo Glock	Rocketsports Racing	81	+8.501 secs	6	19
7	55	(Denmark) Ronnie Bremer	HVM Racing	81	+8.999 secs	9	18
8	10	(United States) A. J. Allmendinger	RuSPORT	81	+10.945 secs	10	15
9	12	(United States) Jimmy Vasser	PKV Racing	81	+14.806 secs	11	14
10	21	(Brazil) Cristiano da Matta	PKV Racing	81	+16.074 secs	8	11
11	19	(Spain) Oriol Servià	Dale Coyne Racing	81	+18.719 secs	14	10
12	4	(Sweden) Björn Wirdheim	HVM Racing	81	+19.651 secs	13	9
13	31	(United States) Ryan Hunter-Reay	Rocketsports Racing	81	+20.035 secs	12	8
14	5	(Australia) Marcus Marshall	Team Australia	80	+ 1 Lap	17	7
15	15	(Canada) Alex Tagliani	Team Australia	79	+ 2 Laps	7	6
16	41	(Italy) Fabrizio del Monte	Jensen Motorsports	74	+ 7 Laps	19	5
17	27	(Canada) Andrew Ranger	Mi-Jack Conquest Racing	70	Contact	16	4
18	34	(France) Nelson Philippe	Mi-Jack Conquest Racing	61	+ 20 Laps	15	3
19	11	(Brazil) Ricardo Sperafico	Dale Coyne Racing	41	Gearbox	18	2

== Caution flags ==
Laps	Cause
8–10	Philippe (34) contact
32–34	del Monte (41) spin/stall
45–46	Sperafico (11) stopped on course
72–75	Ranger (27) contact

== Lap leaders ==
Laps	Leader
1–2	Paul Tracy
3–10	Bruno Junqueira
11–28	Paul Tracy
29	Mario Domínguez
30–31	Sébastien Bourdais
32–34	Jimmy Vasser
35–37	Paul Tracy
38–60	Sébastien Bourdais
61	Justin Wilson
62–63	Ronnie Bremer
64–69	Jimmy Vasser
70–81	Sébastien Bourdais

Driver	Laps led
Sébastien Bourdais	37
Paul Tracy	23
Jimmy Vasser	9
Bruno Junqueira	8
Ronnie Bremer	2
Mario Domínguez	1
Justin Wilson	1

- Average Speed 89.811 mph

Previous race: 2004 Gran Premio Telmex/Tecate; Previous Season	Champ Car World Series; 2005 season	Next race: 2005 Tecate/Telmex Grand Prix of Monterrey
Previous race: 2004 Toyota Grand Prix of Long Beach	2005 Toyota Grand Prix of Long Beach	Next race: 2006 Toyota Grand Prix of Long Beach
