= Charles Zwolsman Jr. =

Dutch racing driver

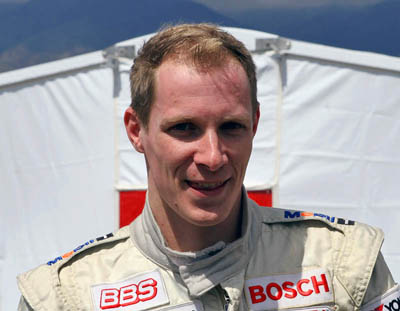
- Nationality: (Netherlands) Dutch
- Born: 15 June 1979 (age 47) Lelystad, Netherlands
- Categorisation: FIA Platinum (until 2013); FIA Gold (2014–)
- Achievements: 2005 Toyota Atlantic Champion

Champ Car career
- 15 races run over 2 years
- Years active: 2005–2006
- Team(s): Team Australia (2005); Conquest Racing (2006)
- Best finish: 13th - 2006
- First race: 2005 Gran Premio Telmex/Tecate (Mexico City)
- Last race: 2006 Gran Premio Telmex (Mexico City)
Wins	Podiums	Poles
0	0	0

24 Hours of Le Mans career
- Years: 2009
- Teams: Kolles
- Best finish: 7th
- Class wins: 0

Charles Zwolsman Jr. (born June 15, 1979, in Lelystad, Netherlands) is a race car driver who formerly competed in the Champ Car World Series. He is the son of former sports car racing driver Charles Zwolsman Sr., who competed in the late 1980s and early 1990s.

Zwolsman started racing go karts before competing in Formula Ford, Formula Renault and Formula 3 in Europe. He finished 16th and 17th during his two seasons in the Formula 3 Euro Series before moving his career to the United States.

In 2005, Zwolsman made his debut in the Toyota Atlantic series with Condor Motorsports. He made an impression quickly; he was fastest in qualifying in the first race at Long Beach. However, his car failed the technical inspection and he was forced to start last. During the race, he moved up steadily to finish third. Zwolsman went on to win three races that season and clinch the championship over rivals Tõnis Kasemets and Katherine Legge. The newly crowned Atlantic champion made his Champ Car debut in the season finale in Mexico City for Team Australia.

In 2006, Zwolsman competed in a full season of the Champ Car series with Mi-Jack Conquest Racing, finishing 13th in the season standings with two seventh-place finishes as his best results. He did not return in 2007, and has not competed in American open wheel racing since. In 2009, Zwolsman drove for the Kolles LMP1 team in the Le Mans Series. The team also ran the 2009 24 Hours of Le Mans, where they placed seventh overall despite team driver Narain Karthikeyan not being able to compete due to a non-racing related injury just prior to the start.

In 2011, Zwolsman was charged in the Netherlands with involvement in money laundering. According to the prosecutors, Zwolsman financed his racing career with the proceeds of the criminal activities of his father. The prosecution has asked for a 240-hour community service sentence, a 15-month suspended prison sentence and a 20,000 euro fine. Zwolsman Jr. has denied all charges.

Zwolsman proceeded to fight these allegations and after some major investors/sponsors where acquitted in 2013. Zwolsman himself was also cleared of all charges in 2016.

== Motorsports career results ==
=== Complete Formula 3 Euro Series results ===
(key)

Year	Entrant	Chassis	Engine	1	2	3	4	5	6	7	8	9	10	11	12	13	14	15	16	17	18	19	20	DC	Points
2003	Kolles	Dallara F303/012	HWA-Mercedes	HOC1; 1; 10	HOC1; 2; 12	ADR; 1 Ret	ADR; 2; 7	PAU; 1; 17	PAU; 2; 6	NOR; 1 Ret	NOR; 2; 9	LMS; 1; 10	LMS; 2; 14	NÜR; 1; 12	NÜR; 2; 13	A1R; 1; 7	A1R; 2; 13	ZAN; 1; 16	ZAN; 2; 18	HOC2; 1; 12	HOC2; 2; 9	MAG; 1; 11	MAG; 2 Ret	19th	7
2004	Manor Motorsport	Dallara F302/090	HWA-Mercedes	HOC1; 1 Ret	HOC1; 2; 10	EST; 1; 15	EST; 2; 12	ADR; 1; 13	ADR; 1; 17	PAU; 1; 10	PAU; 2 Ret	NOR; 1 Ret	NOR; 1 Ret	MAG; 1; 12	MAG; 2; 6	NÜR; 1; 12	NÜR; 2; 10	ZAN; 1; 17	ZAN; 2; 20	BRN; 1; 14	BRN; 2; 10	HOC2; 1; 3	HOC2; 2; 13	16th	9

=== American open–wheel racing results ===
(key)

==== Atlantic Championship ====
Year	Team	1	2	3	4	5	6	7	8	9	10	11	12	Rank	Points	Ref
2005	Condor Motorsports	LBH; 3	MTY; 1	POR1; 2	POR2; 8	CLE1; 1	CLE2; 1	TOR; 12	EDM; 2	SJO; 3	DEN; 3	ROA; 6	MTL; 6	1st	306	

==== Champ Car ====
Year	Team	No.	1	2	3	4	5	6	7	8	9	10	11	12	13	14	Rank	Points	Ref
2005	Team Australia	25	LBH	MTY	MIL	POR	CLE	TOR	EDM	SJO	DEN	MTL	LVG	SRF	MXC; 13		27th	8	
2006	Conquest Racing	34	LBH; 12	HOU; 15	MTY; 12	MIL; 9	POR; 12	CLE; 15	TOR; 9	EDM; 10	SJO; 9	DEN; 10	MTL; 8	ROA; 7	SRF; 7	MXC; 11	13th	162	

=== Complete 24 Hours of Le Mans results ===
Year	Team	Co-Drivers	Car	Class	Laps	Pos.	Class Pos.
2009	(Germany) Kolles	(India) Narain Karthikeyan (Germany) André Lotterer	Audi R10 TDI	LMP1	369	7th	7th

Sporting positions
Preceded by Jon Fogarty	Toyota Atlantic Champion; 2005	Succeeded by Simon Pagenaud
