= Fabrizio del Monte =

Italian racing driver

- Nationality: (Italy) Italian
- Born: 5 December 1980 (age 45) Latina, Lazio, Italy
- Categorisation: FIA Gold (until 2017); FIA Silver (2018–2022); FIA Bronze (2023–)

Fabrizio del Monte (born 5 December 1980 in Latina, Lazio) is an Italian racing driver.

Del Monte drove for three seasons in European Formula 3000 before driving three Champ Car events in 2005, often on the strength of sponsorship. He said he had secured Midland's third driver seat for the 2006 San Marino Grand Prix, but this fell through due to lack of sponsorship. His place was taken by Giorgio Mondini. Del Monte was also to be the team's third driver in the Hungarian Grand Prix.

== Career results ==
=== Complete Formula Renault 2.0 Italia results ===
(key) (Races in bold indicate pole position) (Races in italics indicate fastest lap)

Year	Entrant	1	2	3	4	5	6	7	8	9	10	DC	Points
2000	RC Benetton Junior Team	IMO; 30	MGI; 2	VAR; Ret	MNZ; Ret	VLL; 7	VLL; 2	PER; 13	**BIN**; 14	MIS; 2	VAL; 11	6th	82

=== Complete German Formula Three Championship results ===
(key) (Races in bold indicate pole position) (Races in italics indicate fastest lap)

Year	Entrant	Chassis	Engine	1	2	3	4	5	6	7	8	9	10	11	12	13	14	15	16	17	18	19	20	DC	Points
2001	Team Ghinzani	Dallara F301	Opel	HOC1; 1 Ret	HOC1; 2; 23†	NÜR1; 1; 15	NÜR1; 2 Ret	OSC; 1 Ret	OSC; 2; 22	SAC; 1; 19	SAC; 2 Ret	NOR; 1 DNQ	NOR; 2 Ret	HOC2; 1; 16	HOC2; 2; 18	LAU; 1; 19	LAU; 2; 23	NÜR2; 1 DNS	NÜR2; 2 Ret	A1R; 1; 19	A1R; 2; 10	HOC3; 1 DNS	HOC3; 2; 16	32nd	1

=== Complete Euro Formula 3000 results ===
(key) (Races in bold indicate pole position) (Races in italics indicate fastest lap)

Year	Entrant	1	2	3	4	5	6	7	8	9	10	DC	Points
2002	Team Ghinzani	VLL; 13	NÜR; C	PER; Ret	MNZ; 12	DON; 9	SPA; 13	BRN	DIJ; 13	JER; 8	CAG; 10	18th	0
2003	GP Racing	NÜR; Ret	MAG; 9	PER; 6	MNZ; 3	SPA; 3	DON; 4	BRN; 1	JER; 2	CAG; 4		2nd	31
2004	GP Racing	**BRN**; 1	EST; 1	JER; 1	MNZ; 3	SPA; 3	DON; Ret	DIJ; 3	ZOL; 5	NÜR1; 6	NÜR2; Ret	2nd	45
2005	GP Racing	ADR; 2	VLL; 4	BRN; 7	IMO	MUG	MGI	MNZ	MIS			8th	15

=== Complete Champ Car results ===
(key)

Year	Team	No.	1	2	3	4	5	6	7	8	9	10	11	12	13	Rank	Points	Ref
2005	Jensen MotorSport	41	LBH; 16	MTY	MIL	POR	CLE	TOR	EDM	SJO	DEN	MTL	LVG			**26th**	**10**	
2005	HVM Racing	4												SRF; 16	MXC	**26th**	**10**	
