= Ronnie Bremer =

Danish racing driver

Ronnie Bremer (born 14 October 1978) is a Danish racecar driver who has driven in the Champ Car World Series.

Bremer won three consecutive Danish Formula A karting championships from 1998 to 2000, before racing in British Formula Ford and Formula 3. In 2003, he shifted his career to America, running in the Toyota Atlantic Series, where he notched one win and finished fifth in the Championship.

In a somewhat surprising move, the HVM team signed Bremer, still a relative unknown, to a Champ Car ride for 2005. The rookie was impressive in his first five starts, but he was dropped by HVM for financial reasons. However, HVM soon announced that regardless, they had already signed Bremer for 2006. After missing one race, Bremer joined the Dale Coyne Racing team to finish the 2005 season. Ronnie claimed that he would be returning to HVM, but this proved not to be the case. The team instead signed Dan Clarke and Nelson Philippe. Bremer returned to Atlantics for the last few races of the 2006 season driving for Polestar Racing Group. He tested for RuSport in the hope of replacing the injured Cristiano da Matta for the final two races of 2006, but the drive went to Ryan Briscoe.

Bremer returned to Polestar in 2007 for a partial season of Atlantics racing. After Polestar suspended operations, he announced a move to Brooks Associates racing, where he began starting with the race at San Jose.

Bremer has the record of most winning Danish racecar driver

Bremer now drives for Team Stevenson Motorsport in the Rolex Grand Am (2011)

== Racing record ==
2011 > Present - GRAND-AM Rolex Sports Car Series(Stevenson Motorsports) Daytona Rolex 24 and Jet Black Racing — Dubai 24

2010 GRAND-AM Rolex Series (Stevenson Motorsports) Team Rhino’s Leipert ADAC GT Masters

2009 Peugeot Spider Cup, Denmark Champion Wins 14 of 14 races, Record in Danish racing history. Team Rhino’s Leipert ADAC GT Masters

Peugeot Spider International Finales (SPA Belgium) Podium FIA Copenhagen Historic Grand Prix Royal Pro/Am Champion

2008 Danish Touring Car (KP Racing Mercedes) Mini Le Mans i Peugeot 207 Spider

2007 ChampCar Atlantic Series

2006 Danish Touring Car

2005 ChampCar World Series

2004 Toyota ChampCar Atlantic Series Rookie of the year

2003 Petit Le Mans Danish Touring Car Championship Champion British Formula 3

2002 Danish Touring Car British Formula 3

2001 Danish Championship for Teams (Karting) – Champion Formula Ford Festival Vice Champion British Formula Ford

2000 Yokohama Cup – Winner Danish Formula A Championship – Champion Italian Formula A Championship Winner Nordic Championship, Vice Champion

1999 Danish Formula A Championship – Champion Formula Super A World Championship

1998 Danish Championship Formula A – Champion Formula A European Championship Formula A World Championship

1997 Danish Formula A Championship Challenge Race – Champion McDonald's Grand Final – Champion Viking Trophy — Vice Champion Nordic Championship ICA — Vice Champion

1996 (Karting) Danish Championship German Winter Cup Championship

1995 (Karting) Regional Championship – Champion Danish Championship — Vice Champion

1990 – 1994 (Karting): Danish Championship Formula Junior (1990) Champion

=== American open–wheel racing results ===
(key)

==== Atlantic Championship ====
Year	Team	1	2	3	4	5	6	7	8	9	10	11	12	Rank	Points
2004	Brooks Associates Racing	LBH; 4	MTY; 4	MIL; 2	POR1; 8	POR2; 9								5th	251
2004	Polestar Racing Group						CLE; 6	TOR; 3	VAN; 3	ROA; Ret	DEN; 1	MTL; Ret	LS; 2	5th	251
2006	Polestar Racing Group	LBH	HOU	MTY	POR	CLE1	CLE2	TOR	EDM	SJO	DEN	MTL; 14	ROA	39th	7
2007	Polestar Racing Group	LVG; 8	LBH; 8	HOU; 9	POR1; 10	POR2; 13	CLE; 7	MTT	TOR	EDM1	EDM2			15th	92
2007	Brooks Associates Racing											SJO; 9	ROA	15th	92

==== Champ Car ====
Year	Team	No.	1	2	3	4	5	6	7	8	9	10	11	12	13	Rank	Points	Ref
2005	HVM Racing	55	LBH; 7	MTY; 19	MIL; 8	POR; 8	CLE; 14	TOR								12th	139	
2005	Dale Coyne Racing	19							EDM; 6	SJO; 7	DEN; 7	MTL; 17	LVG; 18	SRF; 8	MXC; 19	12th	139	
