= Ricardo Sperafico =

Brazilian professional racing driver

- Nationality: (Brazil) Brazilian
- Born: 23 July 1979 (age 47) Toledo, Paraná (Brazil)
- Relatives: Rodrigo Sperafico (twin brother); Alexandre Sperafico (cousin); Rafael Sperafico (cousin)
- Categorisation: FIA Platinum

Ricardo Sperafico (born 23 July 1979) is a Brazilian professional racing driver.

== Career ==
Born in Toledo, Sperafico resides in a family of racers, twin brother of Rodrigo, and with two cousins, Alexandre and the late Rafael. He began his career in Europe in Formula Ford where he won the British Formula Ford Winter Series in 1996. In 1998 and 1999, he competed in South American Formula Three and won the Italian Formula 3000 series and the Bologna Motorshow F3000 Sprint in 2000, before moving to International F3000 competition the following season. In 2002, Ricardo, Rodrigo and Alexandre all raced in the series with Ricardo finishing the best, fifth, driving for Petrobras Junior Team. He finished runner-up in 2003 before taking 2004 off. In 2003 he also won the Race of Stars.

In 2005, Sperafico competed for the rookie-of-the-year title in Champ Car, driving for Dale Coyne Racing. He had a difficult time coming to grips with the series, with no less than five different team-mates over the course of the year. His best finish was 8th in Denver. Alexandre also contested occasional Champ Car events from 2003 to 2005.

Sperafico returned to Brazil and competed in the Stock Car Brasil from 2007 to 2013, with modest results. Since 2014, he has entered several editions of the Corrida de Duplas. He also drove part-time in 2018.

== Racing record ==
=== Complete Italian Formula 3000 results ===
(key) (Races in bold indicate pole position; races in italics indicate fastest lap)

Year	Entrant	1	2	3	4	5	6	7	8	DC	Points
2000	ADM Competizione	VLL; 19	**MUG**; 1	IMO; 4	**MNZ**; Ret	**VLL**; 1	**DON**; 1	PER; 4	**MIS**; 1	**1st**	**46**

=== Complete International Formula 3000 results ===
Year	Entrant	1	2	3	4	5	6	7	8	9	10	11	12	DC	Points
2001	Petrobras Junior Team	INT; Ret	IMO; 14	CAT; 19	A1R; Ret	MON; 5	NÜR; 3	MAG; 13	SIL; 11	**HOC**; 3	HUN; 7	**SPA**; 1	MNZ; 3	5th	24
2002	Petrobras Junior Team	INT; 7	IMO; 14	CAT; 9	A1R; 8	MON; 5	NÜR; 2	SIL; 3	MAG; 15	HOC; 6	HUN; 5	SPA; 3	MNZ; 4	5th	22
2003	Coloni Motorsport	IMO; 3	CAT; Ret	**A1R**; 1	MON; DSQ	NÜR; 14	MAG; 3	SIL; 4	**HOC**; 1	HUN; Ret	MNZ; 3			**2nd**	**43**

=== Complete Champ Car results ===
(key)

Yr	Team	No.	1	2	3	4	5	6	7	8	9	10	11	12	13	Rank	Points	Ref
2005	Dale Coyne Racing	11	LBH; 19	MTY; 17	MIL; 14	POR; 13	CLE; 9	TOR; 18	EDM; 10	SJO; 18	DEN; 8	MTL; 18	LVG; 15	SRF; 9	MXC; 18	**17th**	**92**	

=== Complete Stock Car Brasil results ===
Year	Team	Car	1	2	3	4	5	6	7	8	9	10	11	12	Pos	Points
2007	Vivanz-WA Matheis	Chevrolet Astra	INT; Ret	**CTB**; Ret	CGD; 30	INT; 19	LON; 17	SCZ; 13	CTB; 9	BSB; 5	**ARG**; Ret	TAR; 5	**RIO**; 2	INT; DNQ	14th	56
2008	L&M Racing	Peugeot 307	INT; 18	BSB; 20	CTB; 20	SCZ; 25	CGD; 20	INT; 28	RIO; 21	LON; 21	CTB; 17	BSB; 5	TAR; 21	INT; 2	19th	32
2009	RZ Motorsport	Peugeot 307	INT; 21	CTB; Ret	BSB; 9	SCZ; DSQ	INT; 8	SAL; 3	RIO; Ret	CGD; 5	CTB; 2	BSB; 13	TAR; 9	INT; 22	11th	74
2010	Bardahl Hot Car	Chevrolet Vectra	INT	CTB	VE	RIO	RBP	SAL; 17	INT; Ret	CGD					36th	0
2010	Crystal Racing Team	Peugeot 307									LON; Ret	SCZ; DSQ	BSB; 20	CTB; 16	36th	0
2011	AMG Motorsport	Chevrolet Vectra	CTB	INT	RBP	VEL; Ret	CGD								25th	9
2011	Amir Nasr Racing	Peugeot 408						RIO; 12	INT; 16						25th	9
2011	Scuderia 111	Peugeot 408								**SAL**; 20	SCZ; 11	LON; 19	BSB	VEL	25th	9
2012	Prati-Mico's Racing	Peugeot 408	INT; 28	CTB; 14	VEL; 18	RBP; Ret	LON; 15	RIO; 17	SAL; 8	CAS; Ret	TAR; 29	CTB; 12	BSB; 11	INT; 17	19th	64

Sporting positions
Preceded by Giorgio Vinella	Italian Formula 3000 champion 2000	Succeeded by Felipe Massa
