= 2005 Champ Car World Series =

American motorsport season

2005 Champ Car season
- Bridgestone Presents the Champ Car World Series Powered by Ford

Season
- Races: 13
- Start date: April 10
- End date: November 6

Awards
- Drivers' champion: (France) Sébastien Bourdais
- Nations' Cup: France
- Rookie of the Year: (Germany) Timo Glock

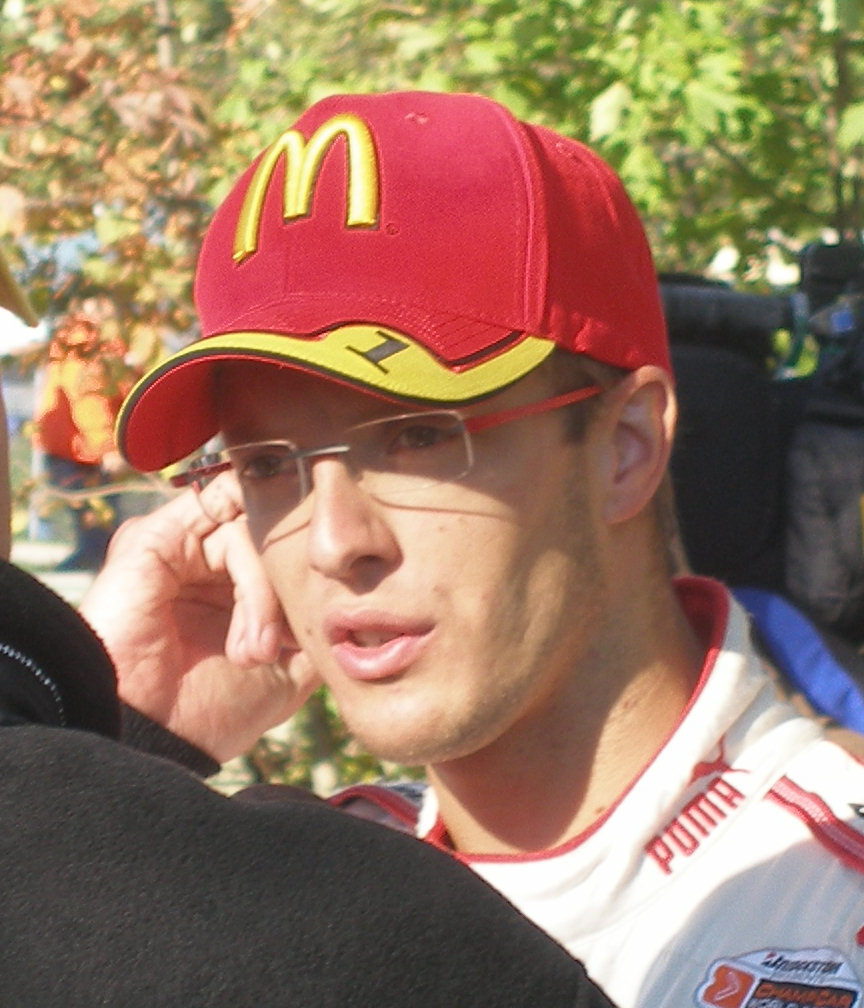
Sébastien Bourdais won back-to-back drivers' titles driving for Newman-Haas Racing

The 2005 Bridgestone Presents the Champ Car World Series Powered by Ford season was the 27th overall and the second season of the Champ Car World Series era of American open-wheel racing. It began on April 10, 2005 in Long Beach, California and ended on November 6 in Mexico City, Mexico after 13 races. The Bridgestone Presents the Champ Car World Series Powered by Ford Drivers' Champion was Sébastien Bourdais, his second consecutive championship. The Rookie of the Year was Timo Glock. The season saw the Lola B02/00 (which debuted in 2002) become the sole chassis for the series.

== Drivers and teams ==
The 2.65 liter turbo V8 Ford-Cosworth XFE engine continued to be the exclusive power plant for the series. Bridgestone continued on as the exclusive series tire supplier as well. The two companies continued the marketing agreement that branded the series Bridgestone Presents the Champ Car World Series Powered by Ford. All teams ran the Lola B02/00 chassis after the 2002 bankruptcy of Reynard Motorsport prevented further development of their Reynard 02I, causing it to become uncompetitive against the Lola.

The following teams and drivers competed in the 2005 Champ Car season.

Team	No	Drivers	Races	Primary Sponsors
(United States) Newman/Haas Racing	1	(France) Sébastien Bourdais	All	McDonald's
(United States) Newman/Haas Racing	2	(Brazil) Bruno Junqueira	1–2	PacifiCare
(United States) Newman/Haas Racing	2	(Spain) Oriol Servià	3–13	PacifiCare
(United States) Forsythe Championship Racing	3	(Canada) Paul Tracy	All	Indeck 10; Mountain Grand Lodge 3
(United States) Forsythe Championship Racing	7	(Mexico) Mario Domínguez	All	Indeck 12; Roshfrans 1
(United States) CTE Racing-HVM	4	(Sweden) Björn Wirdheim	1–11	Eurosport 7 Liqui Moly 4
(United States) CTE Racing-HVM	4	(Italy) Fabrizio del Monte	12	CTE Racing
(United States) CTE Racing-HVM	50	(Mexico) Homero Richards	13	Nextel
(United States) CTE Racing-HVM	55	(Denmark) Ronnie Bremer	1–5	Ansan, Korea 8
(United States) CTE Racing-HVM	55	(Brazil) Alex Sperafico	6–7	Ansan, Korea 8
(United States) CTE Racing-HVM	55	(Mexico) Rodolfo Lavín	8–13	Corona 5
Team Australia	5	(Australia) Marcus Marshall	1–12	Aussie Vineyards
Team Australia	5	(Australia) Will Power	13	Aussie Vineyards
Team Australia	25	(Australia) Will Power	12	Aussie Vineyards
Team Australia	25	(Netherlands) Charles Zwolsman Jr.	13	Aussie Vineyards
Team Australia	15	(Canada) Alex Tagliani	All	Aussie Vineyards
(United States) Rocketsports Racing	8	(Germany) Timo Glock	All	Deutsche Post
(United States) Rocketsports Racing	31	(United States) Ryan Hunter-Reay	1–11	Autobytel.com 1 Briggs & Stratton 3 Cytomax 4 Rocketsports Racing 1 Red Paw Systems 2 Commercial Defeasance 1 The Westin 1
(United States) Rocketsports Racing	31	(United States) Michael McDowell	12–13	Autobytel.com 1 Briggs & Stratton 3 Cytomax 4 Rocketsports Racing 1 Red Paw Systems 2 Commercial Defeasance 1 The Westin 1
(United States) RuSPORT	9	(United Kingdom) Justin Wilson	All	SanDisk 2 Champ Car 2 Intel 4 RuSPORT 1 CDW 4
(United States) RuSPORT	10	(United States) A. J. Allmendinger	All	Beijing '06 5 Western Union 5 CDW 1 Intel 2
(United States) Dale Coyne Racing	11	(Brazil) Ricardo Sperafico	All	Dale Coyne Racing 2 American Medical Response 2 Sonny's Real Pit Bar-B-Q 9
(United States) Dale Coyne Racing	19	(Spain) Oriol Servià	1–2	American Medical Response
(United States) Dale Coyne Racing	19	(Canada) Michael Valiante	4	American Medical Response
(United States) Dale Coyne Racing	19	(Brazil) Tarso Marques	5	American Medical Response
(United States) Dale Coyne Racing	19	(United Kingdom) Ryan Dalziel	6	American Medical Response
(United States) Dale Coyne Racing	19	(Denmark) Ronnie Bremer	7–13	American Medical Response
(United States) PKV Racing	12	(United States) Jimmy Vasser	All	Gulfstream
(United States) PKV Racing	21	(Brazil) Cristiano da Matta	All	Bell Micro
(United States) PKV Racing	52	(Mexico) Jorge Goeters	2	Team Mexico
(United States) Mi-Jack Conquest Racing	27	(Canada) Andrew Ranger	All	Mi-Jack 10; Tide 3
(United States) Mi-Jack Conquest Racing	34	(France) Nelson Philippe	All	Wellbox Body Optimizer
(Canada) Jensen MotorSport	41	(Italy) Fabrizio del Monte	1	Konica Minolta

=== Team and driver changes ===
Similar to the 2003 and 2004 seasons, there were once again many changes for the 2005 season.

- Last season's rookie of the year runner-up Justin Wilson teamed up with the 2004 rookie of the year A. J. Allmendinger at RuSPORT.
- PKV Racing brought 2002 CART champion Cristiano da Matta back to the Champ Car series after he spent two years driving for Toyota in Formula One.
- Rocketsports Racing began the year with Formula One driver Timo Glock and Ryan Hunter-Reay.
- Mi-Jack Conquest Racing signed 2004 Toyota Atlantic rookie of the year Andrew Ranger.
- Mario Domínguez moved to Forsythe Championship Racing after 3 seasons with HVM Racing.
- Domínguez replaced Patrick Carpentier who moved over to the IRL with Cheever Racing.
- Forsythe's third driver in 2004, Rodolfo Lavín, began the 2005 season on the sidelines.
- Walker Racing became Team Australia after a sponsor partnership was formed with Australian businessman Craig Gore. They ran Champ Car veteran Alex Tagliani and a rookie from Australia, Marcus Marshall.
- Domínguez's former team, which renamed itself HVM Racing from Herdez Competition after the salsa company ended its title sponsorship, began the season with 2003 Formula 3000 champion Björn Wirdheim and Toyota Atlantic driver Ronnie Bremer.

=== Mid-season changes ===
- The Jensen MotorSport team only appeared at the opening race of the season with Fabrizio del Monte at the wheel of the #41 car.
- PKV Racing gave Mexican driver Jorge Goeters a one-off drive at the Monterrey race.
- Bruno Junqueira was injured in the 2005 Indianapolis 500 and was replaced in the Newman/Haas team by Oriol Servià who departed Dale Coyne Racing. Servià was replaced by various drivers at Dale Coyne during the season - Michael Valiante in Portland, Tarso Marques in Cleveland, Ryan Dalziel in Toronto and Ronnie Bremer for the remainder of the season. Coyne ran one car at Milwaukee, where Ricardo Sperafico drove the #19 car instead of his usual #11 car for that race.
- Alex Sperafico replaced Ronnie Bremer at HVM Racing for the races in Toronto and Edmonton, with Rodolfo Lavín taking over for the rest of the season.
- Björn Wirdheim did not complete the season with HVM Racing. Fabrizio del Monte joined the team for the Surfers Paradise round and was slated to drive at the finale in Mexico City but suffered a concussion in a crash in practice at the Autódromo Hermanos Rodríguez and was not medically cleared to race.
- Team Australia fielded a third car in Surfers Paradise and Mexico City. Will Power made his Champ Car debut with the team at Surfers Paradise. After Marcus Marshall was released from the team after the race at Surfers Paradise, Power took over his car. In Mexico the team's third car was driven by 2005 Toyota Atlantic champion Charles Zwolsman Jr.
- 2004 Star Mazda champion Michael McDowell replaced Ryan Hunter-Reay in the Rocketsports team for the final two races of the season.
- Cedric the Entertainer entered into a partnership with HVM Racing in October 2005. The race team was rebranded CTE Racing-HVM from that point forward.
- CTE Racing-HVM gave Mexican driver Homero Richards a one-off drive at the race in Mexico City.

== Schedule ==
Icon	Legend
O	Oval/Speedway
R	Road course
S	Street circuit

Rnd	Date	Race Name	Circuit	City/Location
1	April 10	(United States) Toyota Grand Prix of Long Beach	S Streets of Long Beach	Long Beach, California
2	May 22	(Mexico) Tecate/Telmex Grand Prix of Monterrey	R Fundidora Park	Monterrey, Mexico
3	June 4	(United States) Time Warner Cable Road Runner 225	O Milwaukee Mile	West Allis, Wisconsin
4	June 19	(United States) Champ Car Grand Prix of Portland	R Portland International Raceway	Portland, Oregon
5	June 26	(United States) Champ Car Grand Prix of Cleveland	R Cleveland Burke Lakefront Airport	Cleveland, Ohio
6	July 10	(Canada) Molson Indy Toronto	S Exhibition Place	Toronto, Ontario
7	July 17	(Canada) West Edmonton Mall Grand Prix of Edmonton	R Edmonton City Centre Airport	Edmonton, Alberta
8	July 31	(United States) Taylor Woodrow Grand Prix of San Jose	S Streets of San Jose	San Jose, California
9	August 14	(United States) Centrix Financial Grand Prix of Denver	S Denver Civic Center	Denver, Colorado
10	August 28	(Canada) Molson Indy Montreal	R Circuit Gilles Villeneuve	Montreal, Quebec
11	September 24	(United States) Champ Car Hurricane Relief 400	O Las Vegas Motor Speedway	Las Vegas, Nevada
12	October 23	(Australia) Lexmark Indy 300	S Surfers Paradise Street Circuit	Surfers Paradise, Australia
13	November 6	(Mexico) Gran Premio Telmex-Tecate	R Autódromo Hermanos Rodríguez	Mexico City, Mexico

The initial 2005 schedule announced by Champ Car included 14 races, but only 13 races actually took place during the season. The 14th race was scheduled to take place at a newly constructed permanent road circuit in the city of Ansan, South Korea on October 16, the week before the race at Surfers Paradise. The race was canceled in September when it was determined that the circuit was not ready to host the race. It was the second year in a row that a race in Korea was canceled, as a street circuit race in the capital of Seoul was removed from the 2004 schedule. A date at the Ansan circuit was placed on Champ Car's initial 2006 schedule but that race would never take place either.

== Results ==
Rnd	Race Name	Pole position	Fastest lap	Led most laps	Winning driver	Winning team	Report
1	(United States) Toyota Grand Prix of Long Beach	(Canada) Paul Tracy	(France) Sébastien Bourdais	(France) Sébastien Bourdais	(France) Sébastien Bourdais	Newman/Haas Racing	Report
2	(Mexico) Tecate/Telmex Grand Prix of Monterrey	(France) Sébastien Bourdais	(Germany) Timo Glock	(France) Nelson Philippe	(Brazil) Bruno Junqueira	Newman/Haas Racing	Report
3	(United States) Time Warner Cable Road Runner 225 Presented by US Bank	(United States) Jimmy Vasser	(Canada) Paul Tracy	(Canada) Paul Tracy	(Canada) Paul Tracy	Forsythe Championship Racing	Report
4	(United States) G.I. Joe's Presents the Champ Car Grand Prix of Portland	(United Kingdom) Justin Wilson	(France) Sébastien Bourdais	(Brazil) Cristiano da Matta	(Brazil) Cristiano da Matta	PKV Racing	Report
5	(United States) Champ Car Grand Prix of Cleveland Presented by U.S. Bank	(Canada) Paul Tracy	(Spain) Oriol Servià	(Canada) Paul Tracy	(Canada) Paul Tracy	Forsythe Championship Racing	Report
6	(Canada) Molson Indy Toronto	(France) Sébastien Bourdais	(United Kingdom) Justin Wilson	(France) Sébastien Bourdais	(United Kingdom) Justin Wilson	RuSPORT	Report
7	(Canada) West Edmonton Mall Grand Prix of Edmonton	(United States) A. J. Allmendinger	(United States) A. J. Allmendinger	(United States) A. J. Allmendinger	(France) Sébastien Bourdais	Newman/Haas Racing	Report
8	(United States) Taylor Woodrow Grand Prix of San Jose	(France) Sébastien Bourdais	(France) Sébastien Bourdais	(France) Sébastien Bourdais	(France) Sébastien Bourdais	Newman/Haas Racing	Report
9	(United States) Centrix Financial Grand Prix of Denver Presented by PacifiCare	(Canada) Paul Tracy	(France) Sébastien Bourdais	(Canada) Paul Tracy	(France) Sébastien Bourdais	Newman/Haas Racing	Report
10	(Canada) Molson Indy Montreal	(France) Sébastien Bourdais	(France) Sébastien Bourdais	(France) Sébastien Bourdais	(Spain) Oriol Servià	Newman/Haas Racing	Report
11	(United States) Champ Car Hurricane Relief 400	(France) Sébastien Bourdais	(France) Sébastien Bourdais	(Canada) Paul Tracy	(France) Sébastien Bourdais	Newman/Haas Racing	Report
12	(Australia) Lexmark Indy 300	(Spain) Oriol Servià	(France) Sébastien Bourdais	(France) Sébastien Bourdais	(France) Sébastien Bourdais	Newman/Haas Racing	Report
13	(Mexico) Gran Premio Telmex-Tecate Presented by Banamex	(United Kingdom) Justin Wilson	(United Kingdom) Justin Wilson	(United Kingdom) Justin Wilson	(United Kingdom) Justin Wilson	RuSPORT	Report

=== Final driver standings ===
Pos	Driver	LBH (United States)	FUN (Mexico)	MIL (United States)	POR (United States)	CLE (United States)	TOR (Canada)	EDM (Canada)	SJO (United States)	DEN (United States)	CGV (Canada)	LVS (United States)	SRF (Australia)	MXC (Mexico)	Pts
1	(France) Sébastien Bourdais	1*	**5**	6	2	5	**5***	1	**1***	1	**4***	**1**	1*	17	348
2	(Spain) Oriol Servià	11	9	3	16	3	2	2	3	4	1	2	**5**	4	288
3	(United Kingdom) Justin Wilson	4	4	4	**17**	7	1	4	4	17	3	11	7	**1***	265
4	(Canada) Paul Tracy	**2**	15	1*	3	**1***	16	3	2	**16***	8	17*	17	3	246
5	(United States) A. J. Allmendinger	8	10	2	5	2	12	**14***	17	3	9	13	2	2	227
6	(United States) Jimmy Vasser	9	14	**5**	6	6	4	11	11	15	7	3	3	6	217
7	(Canada) Alex Tagliani	15	3	10	18	4	3	7	9	14	5	7	4	8	207
8	(Germany) Timo Glock RY	6	11	9	10	10	7	13	6	13	2	8	6	5	202
9	(Mexico) Mario Domínguez	5	13	7	4	17	13	5	5	2	10	4	18	12	198
10	(Canada) Andrew Ranger R	17	2	16	7	8	11	18	16	10	11	14	10	9	140
11	(Brazil) Cristiano da Matta	10	6	11	1*	16	17	17	10	18	6	12	19	14	139
12	(Denmark) Ronnie Bremer R	7	19	8	8	14		6	7	7	17	18	8	19	139
13	(France) Nelson Philippe	18	12*	12	12	13	10	9	15	9	15	16	14	7	117
14	(Sweden) Björn Wirdheim R	12	8	15	9	15	15	15	8	11	13	6			115
15	(United States) Ryan Hunter-Reay	13	7	17	15	18	6	16	14	6	12	10			110
16	(Australia) Marcus Marshall R	14	16	13	14	12	14	8	12	12	16	9	11		104
17	(Brazil) Ricardo Sperafico R	19	17	14	13	9	18	10	18	8	18	15	9	18	92
18	(Mexico) Rodolfo Lavín								13	5	14	5	13	15	72
19	(Brazil) Bruno Junqueira	3	1												59
20	(Brazil) Alex Sperafico						8	12							24
21	(United States) Michael McDowell R												12	11	19
22	(Australia) Will Power R												15	10	17
23	(United Kingdom) Ryan Dalziel R						9								13
24	(Brazil) Tarso Marques					11									10
25	(Canada) Michael Valiante R				11										10
26	(Italy) Fabrizio del Monte R	16											16		10
27	(Netherlands) Charles Zwolsman Jr. R													13	8
28	(Mexico) Homero Richards R													16	5
29	(Mexico) Jorge Goeters R		18												3
Pos	Driver	LBH (United States)	FUN (Mexico)	MIL (United States)	POR (United States)	CLE (United States)	TOR (Canada)	EDM (Canada)	SJO (United States)	DEN (United States)	CGV (Canada)	LVS (United States)	SRF (Australia)	MXC (Mexico)	Pts

Color	Result
Gold	Winner
Silver	2nd place
Bronze	3rd place
Green	4th & 5th place
Light Blue	6th-10th place
Dark Blue	Finished (Outside Top 10)
Purple	Did not finish
Red	Did not qualify (DNQ)
Brown	Withdrawn (Wth)
Black	Disqualified (DSQ)
White	Did not start (DNS)
Blank	Did not participate (DNP)
Blank	Not competing

**In-line notation**
**Bold**	Pole position
Italics	Ran fastest race lap
*	Led most race laps
RY Rookie of the Year
R Rookie

=== Nations' Cup ===
- Top result per race counts towards the Nations' Cup

Pos	Country	LBH (United States)	FUN (Mexico)	MIL (United States)	POR (United States)	CLE (United States)	TOR (Canada)	EDM (Canada)	SJO (United States)	DEN (United States)	CGV (Canada)	LVS (United States)	SRF (Australia)	MXC (Mexico)	Pts
1	France	1	5	6	2	5	5	1	1	1	4	1	1	7	346
2	Canada	2	2	1	3	1	3	3	2	10	5	7	4	3	322
3	Spain	11	9	3	16	3	2	2	3	4	1	2	5	4	283
4	United States	8	7	2	5	2	4	11	11	3	7	3	2	2	274
5	England	4	4	4	17	7	1	4	4	17	3	11	7	1	257
6	Brazil	3	1	11	1	9	8	10	10	8	6	12	9	14	211
7	Mexico	5	13	7	4	17	13	5	5	2	10	4	13	12	201
8	Germany	6	11	9	10	10	7	13	6	13	2	8	6	5	198
9	Denmark	7	19	8	8	14		6	7	7	17	18	8	19	133
10	Australia	14	16	13	14	12	14	8	12	12	16	9	11	10	115
11	Sweden	12	8	15	9	15	15	15	8	11	13	6			113
12	Scotland						9								13
13	Italy	16											16		10
14	Netherlands													13	8
Pos	Country	LBH (United States)	FUN (Mexico)	MIL (United States)	POR (United States)	CLE (United States)	TOR (Canada)	EDM (Canada)	SJO (United States)	DEN (United States)	CGV (Canada)	LVS (United States)	SRF (Australia)	MXC (Mexico)	Pts

=== Driver breakdown ===
Pos	Driver	Team	Entries	Wins	Podiums	Top 5	Top 10	Poles	Laps Led	Pts
1	(France) Bourdais	(United States) Newman-Haas Racing	13	6	7	11	12	5	358	348
2	(Spain) Servià	(United States) Dale Coyne Racing (United States) Newman-Haas Racing	13	1	7	10	11	1	29	288
3	(United Kingdom) Wilson	(United States) RuSPORT	13	2	3	8	10	2	123	265
4	(Canada) Tracy	(United States) Forsythe Championship Racing	13	2	7	7	8	3	512	246
5	(United States) Allmendinger	(United States) RuSPORT	13	--	5	6	9	1	59	227
6	(United States) Vasser	(United States) PKV Racing	13	--	2	4	9	1	27	217
7	(Canada) Tagliani	Team Australia	13	--	2	5	10	--	5	207
8	(Germany) Glock	(United States) Rocketsports Racing	13	--	1	2	10	--	19	202
9	(Mexico) Domínguez	(United States) Forsythe Championship Racing	13	--	1	6	8	--	2	198
10	(Canada) Ranger	(United States) Mi-Jack Conquest Racing	13	--	1	1	6	--	--	140
11	(Brazil) da Matta	(United States) PKV Racing	13	1	1	1	5	--	71	139
12	(Denmark) Bremer R	(United States) CTE Racing - HVM (United States) Dale Coyne Racing	12	--	--	--	7	--	31	139
13	(France) Philippe	(United States) Mi-Jack Conquest Racing	13	--	--	--	4	--	23	117
14	(Sweden) Wirdheim R	(United States) CTE Racing - HVM	11	--	--	--	4	--	29	115
15	(United States) Hunter-Reay	(United States) Rocketsports Racing	11	--	--	--	4	--	--	110
16	(Australia) Marshall R	Team Australia	12	--	--	--	2	--	--	104
17	(Brazil) R. Sperafico R	(United States) Dale Coyne Racing	13	--	--	--	4	--	--	92
18	(Mexico) Lavín	(United States) CTE Racing - HVM	6	--	--	2	2	--	5	72
19	(Brazil) Junqueira	(United States) Newman-Haas Racing	2	1	2	2	2	--	17	59
20	(Brazil) A. Sperafico	(United States) CTE Racing - HVM	2	--	--	--	1	--	--	24
21	(United States) McDowell R	(United States) Rocketsports Racing	2	--	--	--	--	--	--	19
22	(Australia) Power R	Team Australia	2	--	--	--	1	--	--	17
23	(United Kingdom) Dalziel R	(United States) Dale Coyne Racing	1	--	--	--	1	--	--	13
24	(Brazil) Marques	(United States) Dale Coyne Racing	1	--	--	--	--	--	--	10
25	(Canada) Valiante R	(United States) Dale Coyne Racing	1	--	--	--	--	--	--	10
26	(Italy) del Monte R	(Canada) Jensen Motorsport (United States) CTE Racing - HVM	2	--	--	--	--	--	--	10
27	(Netherlands) Zwolsman R	Team Australia	1	--	--	--	--	--	--	8
28	(Mexico) Richards R	(United States) CTE Racing - HVM	1	--	--	--	--	--	--	5
29	(Mexico) Goeters R	(United States) PKV Racing	1	--	--	--	--	--	--	3

== Bibliography ==
- Shaw, Jeremy, ed. (2005). The Official Autocourse Champ Car Yearbook 2005/06. London: Crash Media Group. ISBN 978-1-905334-08-7.

== See also ==
- 2005 Toyota Atlantic Championship season
- 2005 Indianapolis 500
- 2005 IndyCar Series
- 2005 Infiniti Pro Series season
