= Race of Stars =

Race of Stars is a karting race with celebrities on a street circuit located in the Historic Center of the city of Cartagena de Indias, Colombia. The race is organised by the Formula Smiles Foundation as a fundraising event. Drivers of worldwide racing series as Formula One, CART, IRL and Formula 3000 take part in the race.

== Races ==
The first race was held in 2003 and was won by Ricardo Sperafico. The 2005 race was won by Pedro de la Rosa.

== RCN Network race ==
A special race "Colombian Race of Stars Nuestra Tele" was held together with RCN TV featuring well-known Colombian actors and TV hosts.
