= Nelson Philippe =

French racing driver

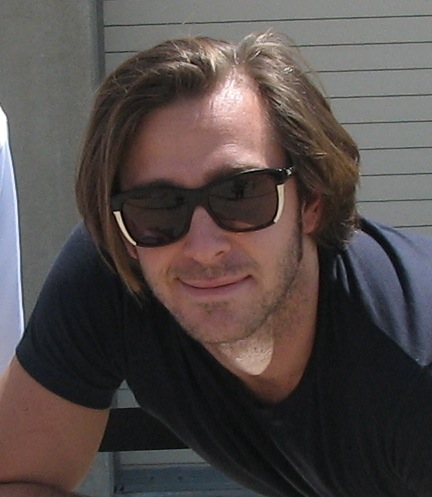
- Nelson Philippe at the Indianapolis Motor Speedway in May 2009.
- Nationality: (France) French
- Born: July 23, 1986 (age 40) Valence, Drôme
- Relatives: Richard Philippe (brother)

IRL IndyCar Series
- Categorisation: FIA Silver
- Years active: 2009
- Teams: HVM Racing; Conquest Racing
- Starts: 2
- Wins: 0
- Poles: 0
- Best finish: 35th in 2009

Nelson Philippe

Champ Car World Series
- Years active: 2004-2007
- Teams: Rocketsports Racing; Conquest Racing; CTE-HVM Racing
- Starts: 41
- Wins: 1
- Poles: 0
- Best finish: 4th in 2006

Previous series
- 2008 2003: Superleague Formula; Barber Dodge Pro Series

Awards
- 2005 & 2006: Champ Car Most Improved Driver

Nelson Philippe (born July 23, 1986 in Valence, Drôme) is a French former professional racing driver.

== Career ==
=== Early career ===
Philippe raced go-karts from 1998-2002. In 2003, he raced in the Barber Dodge Pro Series, finishing the season with one podium, and four top five finishes.

With just one year of experience in cars, Philippe tested with two Champ Car teams, before signing with Paul Gentilozzi's Rocketsports Racing team. At 17, he became the youngest driver to ever race in Champ Car.

Through the first five races of the 2004 season, Philippe generally stayed out of trouble but usually ran at the back of the pack. Philippe was abruptly dropped from the Rocketsports team before the Molson Indy Toronto. After sitting out several races, Philippe rejoined the series later in the year for Mi-Jack Conquest Racing. In 2005, he continued to race for the Conquest team alongside fellow teenager Andrew Ranger. Philippe made a total of nineteen starts for Eric Bachelart's Conquest Racing in 2004 and 2005. Although he struggled with consistency, Phillippe often qualified and ran mid-pack, outpacing the more highly regarded Ranger towards the end of the year. While driving for Conquest in 2005, Philippe was voted by his peers as the Bosch Most Improved Driver in the Series, and won the award in 2006 as well.

=== Success at CTE-HVM ===
For the 2006 season, Philippe moved to CTE-HVM Racing and earned his first podium finishes at Milwaukee and Montreal before claiming his first victory at Surfers Paradise. With his victory at Surfers Paradise, Philippe became the youngest winner in Champ Car World Series history, and again being awarded most improved driver in 2006. However, this success was not enough to find Philippe a drive in 2007, whose financial climate stipulated that most drivers had to bring money to the team to race, something Philippe refused to do after his 2006 success.

But on October 3, 2007, it was announced that Philippe would return to Champ Car and drive for his former team, Conquest Racing. Philippe would race at Surfers Paradise and Mexico City. He said at the time: "I'm thrilled to be back, and no better time than now with Surfers Paradise around the corner [October 21]. It's been a challenge to be sidelined this year, but things happen for a reason and right now it's full steam ahead for Australia and Mexico." Despite having sat out the entire season, Philippe qualified a respectable thirteenth and then recorded an even more respectable sixth place finish at Surfers Paradise. "Even though the results may not show it, it was probably one of the best races of my career," said Philippe of the race.

In the season finale at Mexico City, Philippe again qualified thirteenth, but was one of three cars that stalled at the start. He was able to get the car going and ultimately finished in twelfth position, a lap down to the leaders.

=== After Champ Car ===
Philippe returned to race with Minardi/HVM Racing in the 2008 Toyota Grand Prix of Long Beach. This was the final Champ Car World Series race after the merger with the Indy Racing League. He gave tribute to the series that made his career wearing a race suit with past and present Champ Car logos and "Thank you Champ Car staff and fans" inscribed on the back. He finished fifteenth in the race.

In 2008, Philippe drove in the inaugural Superleague Formula season for the Borussia Dortmund team. He also competed in the opening round of the 2008–09 GP2 Asia Series season for ART Grand Prix before being replaced by Pastor Maldonado.

Philippe announced on April 24, 2009 on Fox News that his new "i Drive Green" race team would be fielding the first-ever carbon neutral entry in the Indianapolis 500 in conjunction with HVM Racing. Philippe struggled in practice and qualifying but ultimately made the field. He made light contact with the wall which was enough to end his race on lap 130. He was credited with 25th.

During practice for the 2009 Indy Grand Prix of Sonoma, Philippe, who was returning to the series for a few late-season road course races with Conquest Racing, spun exiting turn 3 and stalled on the track. E. J. Viso barely avoided him but Will Power had nowhere to go and crashed into the stationary Frenchman. Power suffered two fractured vertebrae while Philippe suffered a fractured ankle. Both also suffered concussions and were subsequently hospitalized.

Philippe’s younger brother, Richard Philippe, also a racer, died in a helicopter crash in the Dominican Republic in November 2018.

== Motorsports career results ==
=== American Open-Wheel racing results ===
(key)

==== Barber Dodge Pro Series ====
Year	1	2	3	4	5	6	7	8	9	10	Rank	Pts
2003	STP; 10	MTY; 5	MIL; 15	LAG; 18	POR; 7	CLE; 15	TOR; 16	VAN; 3	MDO; 4	MTL; 4	9th	66

==== Champ Car ====
Year	Team	No.	Chassis	Engine	1	2	3	4	5	6	7	8	9	10	11	12	13	14	Rank	Pts	Ref
2004	Rocketsports Racing	17	Lola B02/00	Ford XFE V8t	LBH; 13	MTY; 10	MIL; 14	POR; 15	CLE; 10	TOR	VAN	ROA							16th	89	
2004	Conquest Racing	14	Reynard 02i	Ford XFE V8t									DEN; 13						16th	89	
2004	Conquest Racing	14	Lola B02/00	Ford XFE V8t										MTL; 17	LAG; 16	LVS; 9	SRF; 10	MXC; 16	16th	89	
2005	Conquest Racing	34	Lola B02/00	Ford XFE V8t	LBH; 18	MTY; 12*	MIL; 12	POR; 12	CLE; 13	TOR; 10	EDM; 9	SJO; 15	DEN; 9	MTL; 15	LVS; 16	SRF; 14	MXC; 7		13th	117	
2006	CTE-HVM Racing	4	Lola B02/00	Ford XFE V8t	LBH; 13	HOU; 4	MTY; 17	MIL; 3	POR; 8	CLE; 10	TOR; 13	EDM; 14	SJO; 4	DEN; 5	MTL; 3	ROA; 14	SRF; 1	MXC; 7	4th	231	
2007	Conquest Racing	34	Panoz DP01	Cosworth XFE V8t	LVS	LBH	HOU	POR	CLE	MTT	TOR	EDM	SJO	ROA	ZOL	ASN	SRF; 6	MXC; 12	19th	28	

==== IndyCar Series ====
Year	Team	No.	Chassis	Engine	1	2	3	4	5	6	7	8	9	10	11	12	13	14	15	16	17	18	19	Rank	Pts	Ref
2008	HVM Racing	4	Panoz DP01	Cosworth XFE V8t	HMS	STP	MOT^{1} DNP	LBH^{1} 15	KAN	INDY	MIL	TXS	IOW	RIR	WGL	NSH	MDO	EDM	KTY	SNM	DET	CHI	SRF^{2}	44th	0	
2009	HVM Racing	00	Dallara IR-05	Honda HI7R V8	STP	LBH	KAN	INDY; 25	MIL	TXS	IOW	RIR	WGL	TOR	EDM	KTY	MDO							35th	16	
2009	Conquest Racing	34	Dallara IR-05	Honda HI7R V8														SNM; DNS	CHI	MOT	HMS			35th	16	

^{1} Run on same day.
^{2} Non-points-paying, exhibition race.

==== Indianapolis 500 ====
Year	Chassis	Engine	Start	Finish	Team
2009	Dallara	Honda	31	25	HVM Racing

=== Complete Superleague Formula results ===
(key)

Year	Team	1	2	3	4	5	6	7	8	9	10	11	12	Rank	Pts
2008	Borussia Dortmund Zakspeed	DON; 1; 15	DON; 2; 4	NÜR; 1; 15	NÜR; 2 DNS	ZOL; 1	ZOL; 2	EST; 1	EST; 2	VLL; 1	VLL; 2	JER; 1	JER; 2	14th	218

=== Complete GP2 Asia Series results ===
(key) (Races in bold indicate pole position) (Races in italics indicate fastest lap)

Year	Entrant	1	2	3	4	5	6	7	8	9	10	11	12	DC	Pts
2008–09	ART Grand Prix	SHI; FEA; 17	SHI; SPR; 13	DUB; FEA	DUB; SPR	BHR; FEA	BHR; SPR	LSL; FEA	LSL; SPR	SEP; FEA	SEP; SPR	BHR; FEA	BHR; SPR	34th	0
