= RuSPORT =

Auto racing team

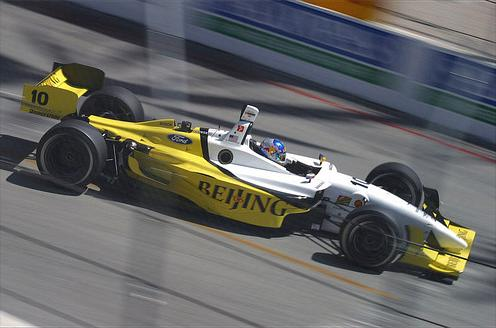
A. J. Allmendinger in the RuSPORT #10 at the 2005 Toyota Grand Prix of Long Beach

RuSPORT was an auto racing team that competed in the Champ Car World Series. It was founded in September 2002 by Carl Russo.

== Team history ==
Russo drove for the team then known as Performance Development and Racing (PDR) based in Fort Collins, Colorado (USA) which was owned by Steve Wulff. Russo competed in the Toyota Atlantic Series driving a car prepared by PDR in the 2002 season before he decided that team ownership suited him better than being a driver. Russo acquired the assets of PDR from Wulff in late 2002, which gave rise to RuSPORT. Wulff stayed on Operations Director and Gerald Tyler was appointed as Technical Director. Jeremy Dale, a longtime associate of Russo's, was brought on as President of the new operation.

RuSPORT competed in the 2003 Toyota Atlantic Championship Series with drivers Aaron Justus and A. J. Allmendinger. Allmendinger won the championship with seven victories from 11 starts.

RuSPORT and Allmendinger moved to Champ Car in 2004 along with a second car driven by Michel Jourdain Jr. The team quickly grew from a small Atlantic Series team to a two-car Champ Car team with more than 40 employees. The rookie team placed Jourdain and Allmendinger in the top-five numerous time en route to Allmendinger winning Rookie-of-the-Year honors. This was only the second time in the history of the Champ Car Series that a rookie team with a rookie driver accomplished the feat.

In 2005, Justin Wilson was signed as a replacement for 2005 for Jourdain, leading the team to their first wins. Wilson scored two victories (Toronto and Mexico City) and finished third in the championship. Allmendinger came close to victory, with four runner-up finishes during the season. For 2006 they were expected to be challengers to Newman/Haas Racing. Mid-way through the season & after 3 straight top 10 finishes, the team surprisingly replaced Allmendinger with 2002 CART champion Cristiano da Matta who moved over from Dale Coyne Racing. Allmendinger would win the next 3 races in a row for his new team. Cristiano da Matta was injured in a freak collision with a deer during testing at Road America on August 3, 2006.

On September 17, 2006, the team announced that it had selected Australian Ryan Briscoe, to fill in for the final two races of the 2006 season, Surfers Paradise, Australia and Mexico City.

At the conclusion of the 2006 season, Russo's time and energy were being increasingly directed toward his rapidly growing company, Calix, and he was forced to leave behind the team he created and the sport he loved. In November 2006 PKV Racing co-owner Dan Pettit purchased the team from Russo.

On January 22, 2007, RuSPORT confirmed the return of Justin Wilson and title sponsor, CDW. They reportedly signed Wilson to a multi-year contract. RuSPORT also formed a technical alliance with the Rocketsports team, and the team was dubbed RSPORTS. Wilson won at Assen and scored solidly enough to finish second overall, while Tagliani struggled and finished outside the series top 10. The alliance was however dissolved before the end of the 2007 season. The RuSPORT team dissolved as of December 31, 2007 and Pettit merged his team ownership with Forsythe Championship Racing. Forsythe would ultimately fold its team when ChampCar merged into the Indy Racing League for 2008.

== Past drivers ==
- (United States) A. J. Allmendinger (2003–2006)
- (Australia) Ryan Briscoe (2006)
- (Brazil) Cristiano da Matta (2006)
- (Mexico) Michel Jourdain Jr. (2004)
- (United States) Aaron Justus (2003)
- (United Kingdom) Justin Wilson (2005–2007)

== Racing results ==
=== Complete Champ Car World Series results ===
(key) (results in bold indicate pole position) (results in italics indicate fastest lap)

Year	Chassis	Engine	Drivers	No.	1	2	3	4	5	6	7	8	9	10	11	12	13	14	Pts Pos	Pts
2004					LBH	MTY	MIL	POR	CLE	TOR	VAN	ROA	DEN	MTL	LAG	LSV	SFR	MXC		
2004	Lola B02/00	Ford XFE V8t	(Mexico) Michel Jourdain Jr.	9	11	11	3	14	15	15	2	9	14	6	4	11	17	9	12th	185
2004	Lola B02/00	Ford XFE V8t	(United States) A. J. Allmendinger	10	12	17	5	6	6	11	3	13	5	5	15	6	6	3	6th	229
2005					LBH	MTY	MIL	POR	CLE	TOR	EDM	SJO	DEN	MTL	LSV	SRF	MXC			
2005	Lola B02/00	Ford XFE V8t	(United Kingdom) Justin Wilson	9	4	4	4	**17**	7	1	4	4	17	3	11	7	**1***		**3rd**	265
2005	Lola B02/00	Ford XFE V8t	(United States) A. J. Allmendinger	10	8	10	2	5	2	12	**14***	17	3	9	13	2	2		5th	227
2006					LBH	HOU	MTY	MIL	POR	CLE	TOR	EDM	SJO	DEN	MTL	ROA	SRF	MXC		
2006	Lola B02/00	Ford XFE V8t	(United Kingdom) Justin Wilson	9	2	5	2	2	2	13	**4**	1	3	8	14	5	Wth	**2***	**2nd**	298
2006	Lola B02/00	Ford XFE V8t	(United States) A. J. Allmendinger	10	16	8	3	4											**3rd**	285
2006	Lola B02/00	Ford XFE V8t	(Brazil) Cristiano da Matta	10					5	14	5	18	2						15th	134
2006	Lola B02/00	Ford XFE V8t	(Australia) Ryan Briscoe	10													11	14	21st	17
2007					LSV	LBH	HOU	POR	CLE	MTT	TOR	EDM	SJO	ROA	ZOL	ASN	SFR	MXC		
2007	Panoz DP01	Cosworth XFE V8t	(United Kingdom) Justin Wilson^{1}	9											5	1*	2	10	**2nd**	281

1. Competed as RSPORTS at Rds. 1-10.
