= 2005 Lexmark Indy 300 =

Coordinates: 27°59′17.9″S 153°25′42.1″E

(Australia) 2005 Surfers Paradise
Race details
- Race 12 of 13 in the 2005 Champ Car season
- Track map of the Surfers Paradise street circuit at Surfers Paradise, Australia.
- Date: 22 October, 2005
- Official name: 2005 Lexmark Indy 300
- Location: Surfers Paradise Street Circuit; Queensland, Australia
- Course: Temporary Street Circuit; 2.795 mi / 4.498 km
- Distance: 57 laps 159.315 mi / 256.386 km
- Weather: Warm with temperatures reaching up to 31.8 °C (89.2 °F)

Pole position
- Driver: (Spain) Oriol Servià (Newman/Haas Racing)
- Time: 1:32.616

Fastest lap
- Driver: (France) Sébastien Bourdais (Newman/Haas Racing)
- Time: 1:32.063 (on lap 39 of 57)

Podium
- First: (France) Sébastien Bourdais (Newman/Haas Racing)
- Second: (United States) A. J. Allmendinger (RuSPORT)
- Third: (United States) Jimmy Vasser (PKV Racing)

The 2005 Lexmark Indy 300 was the twelfth and penultimate round of the 2005 Bridgestone Presents the Champ Car World Series Powered by Ford season, held on 22 October 2005 on the Surfers Paradise Street Circuit, Queensland, Australia. Sébastien Bourdais won the race and also clinched his second consecutive Champ Car championship. Oriol Servià earned his first and to date only pole position in his career. The race also marked the final career podium for 1996 CART champion Jimmy Vasser, who finished third running for his co-owned team PKV Racing.

== Qualifying results ==
Pos	Nat	Name	Team	Qual 1	Qual 2	Best
1	(Spain)	Oriol Servià	Newman/Haas Racing	1:47.872	1:32.616	1:32.616
2	(France)	Sébastien Bourdais	Newman/Haas Racing	1:45.739	1:33.211	1:33.211
3	(Mexico)	Mario Domínguez	Forsythe Racing	1:48.865	1:32.667	1:32.667
4	(Brazil)	Cristiano da Matta	PKV Racing	1:48.346	1:32.753	1:32.753
5	(Canada)	Paul Tracy	Forsythe Racing	1:46.920	1:32.976	1:32.976
6	(United States)	A. J. Allmendinger	RuSPORT	1:49.257	1:33.250	1:33.250
7	(United Kingdom)	Justin Wilson	RuSPORT	1:49.922	1:33.360	1:33.360
8	(United States)	Jimmy Vasser	PKV Racing	1:48.792	1:33.703	1:33.703
9	(Canada)	Alex Tagliani	Team Australia	1:46.010	1:34.137	1:34.137
10	(Germany)	Timo Glock	Rocketsports Racing	1:51.479	1:34.554	1:34.554
11	(Australia)	Will Power	Team Australia	1:50.777	1:34.599	1:34.599
12	(Mexico)	Rodolfo Lavín	CTE Racing – HVM	1:49.623	1:34.780	1:34.780
13	(Australia)	Marcus Marshall	Team Australia	1:49.142	1:34.854	1:34.854
14	(France)	Nelson Philippe	Mi-Jack Conquest Racing	1:47.321	1:34.937	1:34.937
15	(Denmark)	Ronnie Bremer	Dale Coyne Racing	1:50.006	1:35.406	1:35.406
16	(United States)	Michael McDowell	Rocketsports Racing	1:49.870	1:35.415	1:35.415
17	(Canada)	Andrew Ranger	Mi-Jack Conquest Racing	1:51.337	1:35.645	1:35.645
18	(Brazil)	Ricardo Sperafico	Dale Coyne Racing	1:48.355	1:35.711	1:35.711
19	(Italy)	Fabrizio del Monte	CTE Racing – HVM	1:50.702	1:36.268	1:36.268

== Race ==
Pos	No	Driver	Team	Laps	Time/retired	Grid	Points
1	1	(France) Sébastien Bourdais	Newman/Haas Racing	57	1:39:26.671	2	34
2	10	(United States) A. J. Allmendinger	RuSPORT	57	+9.130 secs	6	27
3	12	(United States) Jimmy Vasser	PKV Racing	57	+31.852 secs	8	25
4	15	(Canada) Alex Tagliani	Team Australia	57	+36.420 secs	9	23
5	2	(Spain) Oriol Servià	Newman/Haas Racing	57	+43.968 secs	1	22
6	8	(Germany) Timo Glock	Rocketsports Racing	57	+45.616 secs	10	19
7	9	(United Kingdom) Justin Wilson	RuSPORT	57	+59.630 secs	7	17
8	19	(Denmark) Ronnie Bremer	Dale Coyne Racing	57	+65.852 secs	15	15
9	11	(Brazil) Ricardo Sperafico	Dale Coyne Racing	57	+76.292 secs	18	14
10	27	(Canada) Andrew Ranger	Mi-Jack Conquest Racing	57	+93.488 secs	17	11
11	5	(Australia) Marcus Marshall	Team Australia	56	+ 1 Lap	13	10
12	31	(United States) Michael McDowell	Rocketsports Racing	56	+ 1 Lap	16	9
13	55	(Mexico) Rodolfo Lavín	CTE Racing – HVM	53	+ 4 Laps	12	8
14	34	(France) Nelson Philippe	Mi-Jack Conquest Racing	47	Off course	14	7
15	25	(Australia) Will Power	Team Australia	29	Contact	11	6
16	4	(Italy) Fabrizio del Monte	CTE Racing – HVM	28	Contact	19	5
17	3	(Canada) Paul Tracy	Forsythe Racing	24	Gearbox	5	5
18	7	(Mexico) Mario Domínguez	Forsythe Racing	1	Contact	3	3
19	21	(Brazil) Cristiano da Matta	PKV Racing	0	Contact	4	2

== Caution flags ==
Laps	Cause
1–3	Servià (2), da Matta (21), Domínguez (7) contact
29–32	Power (25) contact; del Monte (4) contact

== Notes ==
Laps	Leader
1–19	Paul Tracy
20–57	Sébastien Bourdais

Driver	Laps led
Sébastien Bourdais	38
Paul Tracy	19

- New Race Lap Record Sébastien Bourdais 1:32.063
- New Race Record Sébastien Bourdais 1:39:26.671
- Average Speed 96.123 mph

== Championship standings after the race ==
- Bold indicates the Season Champion.

Drivers' Championship standings

	Pos	Driver	Points
	1	(France) **Sébastien Bourdais**	344
	2	(Spain) Oriol Servià	265
1	3	(United Kingdom) Justin Wilson	231
1	4	(Canada) Paul Tracy	221
2	5	(United States) A. J. Allmendinger	199

- Note: Only the top five positions are included.

Previous race: 2005 Hurricane Relief 400	Champ Car World Series; 2005 season	Next race: 2005 Gran Premio Telmex/Tecate
Previous race: 2004 Lexmark Indy 300	2005 Lexmark Indy 300	Next race: 2006 Lexmark Indy 300
