= 2005 Gran Premio Telmex/Tecate =

2005 Mexico City
Race details
- Race 13 of 13 in the 2005 Champ Car season
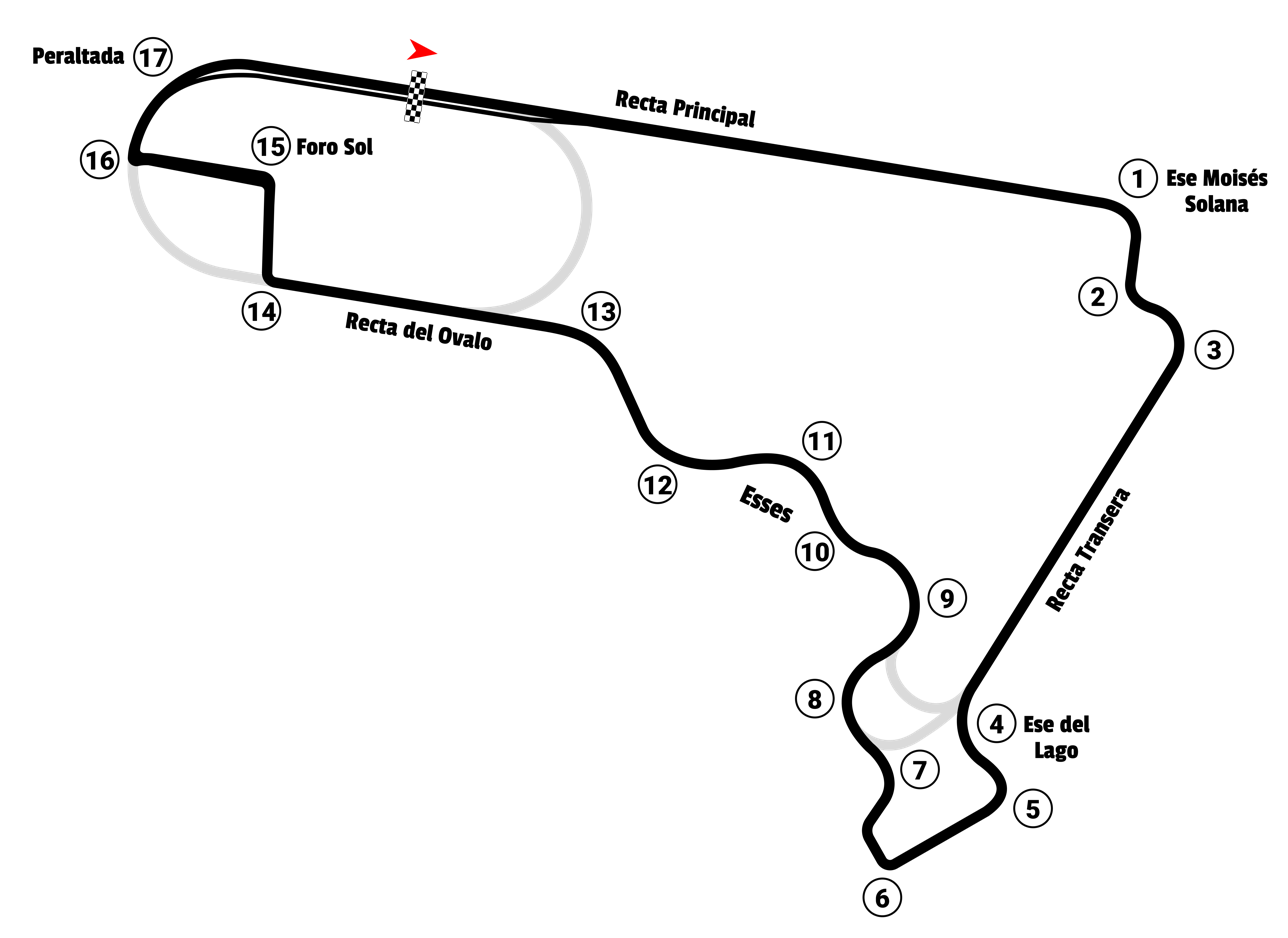
- Autódromo Hermanos Rodríguez Track Layout
- Date: November 6, 2005
- Official name: Gran Premio Telmex/Tecate presented by Banamex
- Location: Autódromo Hermanos Rodríguez; Mexico City, Mexico
- Course: Permanent Road Course; 2.786 mi / 4.484 km
- Distance: 70 laps 195.020 mi / 313.880 km
- Weather: Hazy

Pole position
- Driver: (United Kingdom) Justin Wilson (RuSPORT)
- Time: 1:26.602

Fastest lap
- Driver: (United Kingdom) Justin Wilson (RuSPORT)
- Time: 1:28.479 (on lap 68 of 70)

Podium
- First: (United Kingdom) Justin Wilson (RuSPORT)
- Second: (United States) A. J. Allmendinger (RuSPORT)
- Third: (Canada) Paul Tracy (Forsythe Championship Racing)

The 2005 Gran Premio Telmex/Tecate was the thirteenth and final round of the 2005 Bridgestone Presents the Champ Car World Series Powered by Ford season, held on November 6, 2005 at the Autódromo Hermanos Rodríguez in Mexico City, Mexico. Justin Wilson swept both the pole and the race win.

== Qualifying results ==
Pos	Nat	Name	Team	Qual 1	Qual 2	Best
1	(United Kingdom)	Justin Wilson	RuSPORT	1:28.564	1:26.602	1:26.602
2	(United States)	A. J. Allmendinger	RuSPORT	1:27.349	1:27.033	1:27.033
3	(France)	Sébastien Bourdais	Newman/Haas Racing	1:28.802	1:26.827	1:26.827
4	(Canada)	Paul Tracy	Forsythe Racing	1:27.962	1:26.978	1:26.978
5	(Brazil)	Cristiano da Matta	PKV Racing	1:29.804	1:27.287	1:27.287
6	(Mexico)	Mario Domínguez	Forsythe Racing	1:28.314	1:27.292	1:27.292
7	(Spain)	Oriol Servià	Newman/Haas Racing	1:28.804	1:27.503	1:27.503
8	(France)	Nelson Philippe	Mi-Jack Conquest Racing	1:29.639	1:27.653	1:27.653
9	(Mexico)	Rodolfo Lavín	CTE Racing - HVM	1:29.851	1:27.688	1:27.688
10	(United States)	Jimmy Vasser	PKV Racing	1:28.773	1:27.803	1:27.803
11	(Canada)	Alex Tagliani	Team Australia	1:29.562	1:28.089	1:28.089
12	(Germany)	Timo Glock	Rocketsports Racing	1:29.496	1:28.141	1:28.141
13	(Australia)	Will Power	Team Australia	1:29.445	1:28.195	1:28.195
14	(Brazil)	Ricardo Sperafico	Dale Coyne Racing	1:29.789	1:28.413	1:28.413
15	(Denmark)	Ronnie Bremer	Dale Coyne Racing	1:30.364	1:28.426	1:28.426
16	(United States)	Michael McDowell	Rocketsports Racing	1:30.349	1:28.481	1:28.481
17	(Canada)	Andrew Ranger	Mi-Jack Conquest Racing	1:29.137	1:28.566	1:28.566
18	(Netherlands)	Charles Zwolsman Jr.	Team Australia	1:30.719	1:29.503	1:29.503
19	(Mexico)	Homero Richards	CTE Racing - HVM	1:31.329	1:29.746	1:29.746

== Race ==
Pos	No	Driver	Team	Laps	Time/Retired	Grid	Points
1	9	(United Kingdom) Justin Wilson	RuSPORT	70	1:58:23.479	1	34
2	10	(United States) A. J. Allmendinger	RuSPORT	70	+3.936 secs	2	28
3	3	(Canada) Paul Tracy	Forsythe Racing	70	+6.784 secs	4	25
4	2	(Spain) Oriol Servià	Newman/Haas Racing	70	+9.634 secs	7	23
5	8	(Germany) Timo Glock	Rocketsports Racing	70	+9.923 secs	12	21
6	12	(United States) Jimmy Vasser	PKV Racing	70	+10.477 secs	10	19
7	34	(France) Nelson Philippe	Mi-Jack Conquest Racing	70	+13.348 secs	8	17
8	15	(Canada) Alex Tagliani	Team Australia	70	+14.139 secs	11	15
9	27	(Canada) Andrew Ranger	Mi-Jack Conquest Racing	70	+15.190 secs	17	14
10	5	(Australia) Will Power	Team Australia	70	+16.185 secs	13	11
11	31	(United States) Michael McDowell	Rocketsports Racing	70	+18.060 secs	16	10
12	7	(Mexico) Mario Domínguez	Forsythe Racing	70	+18.678 secs	6	9
13	25	(Netherlands) Charles Zwolsman Jr.	Team Australia	70	+19.459 secs	18	8
14	21	(Brazil) Cristiano da Matta	PKV Racing	70	+21.676 secs	5	7
15	55	(Mexico) Rodolfo Lavín	CTE Racing - HVM	69	+ 1 Lap	9	7
16	50	(Mexico) Homero Richards	CTE Racing - HVM	69	+ 1 Lap	19	5
17	1	(France) Sébastien Bourdais	Newman/Haas Racing	61	Contact	3	4
18	11	(Brazil) Ricardo Sperafico	Dale Coyne Racing	54	Suspension	14	3
19	19	(Denmark) Ronnie Bremer	Dale Coyne Racing	18	Contact	15	2

== Caution flags ==
Laps	Cause
20-26	Bremer (19) contact
58-60	Domínguez (7), Glock (8) contact
62-64	da Matta (21), Bourdais (1) contact

== Notes ==
Laps	Leader
1-21	Justin Wilson
22-26	Rodolfo Lavín
27-70	Justin Wilson

Driver	Laps led
Justin Wilson	65
Rodolfo Lavín	5

- Average Speed 98.835 mph

== Final championship standings ==
- **Bold** indicates the Season Champion.

Drivers' Championship standings

Pos	Driver	Points
1	(France) **Sébastien Bourdais**	348
2	(Spain) Oriol Servià	288
3	(United Kingdom) Justin Wilson	265
4	(Canada) Paul Tracy	246
5	(United States) A. J. Allmendinger	227

- Note: Only the top five positions are included.

Previous race: 2005 Lexmark Indy 300	Champ Car World Series; 2005 season	Next race: 2006 Toyota Grand Prix of Long Beach; Next Season
Previous race: 2004 Gran Premio Telmex/Tecate	2005 Gran Premio Telmex/Tecate	Next race: 2006 Gran Premio Telmex
