= 2005 Centrix Financial Grand Prix of Denver =

Coordinates: 39°44′48″N 105°0′23″W

(United States) 2005 Denver
Race details
- Race 9 of 13 in the 2005 Champ Car season
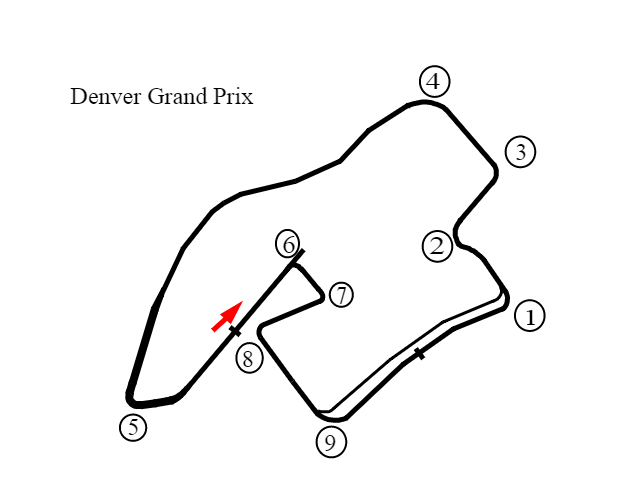
- Date: August 14, 2005
- Official name: Centrix Financial Grand Prix of Denver presented by PacifiCare
- Location: Streets of Denver; Denver, Colorado, United States
- Course: Temporary Street Course; 1.647 mi / 2.651 km
- Distance: 97 laps 159.759 mi / 257.147 km
- Weather: Mostly cloudy with temperatures reaching up to 69.1 °F (20.6 °C); wind speeds approaching 21 miles per hour (34 km/h)

Pole position
- Driver: (Canada) Paul Tracy (Forsythe Championship Racing)
- Time: 59.432

Fastest lap
- Driver: (France) Sébastien Bourdais (Newman/Haas Racing)
- Time: 1:00.574 (on lap 81 of 97)

Podium
- First: (France) Sébastien Bourdais (Newman/Haas Racing)
- Second: (Mexico) Mario Domínguez (Forsythe Championship Racing)
- Third: (United States) A. J. Allmendinger (RuSPORT)

The 2005 Centrix Financial Grand Prix of Denver was the ninth round of the 2005 Bridgestone Presents the Champ Car World Series Powered by Ford season, held on August 14, 2005 on the streets of Denver, Colorado near the Pepsi Center. Paul Tracy sat on the pole and Sébastien Bourdais won the race.

== Qualifying results ==
Pos	Nat	Name	Team	Qual 1	Qual 2	Best
1	(Canada)	Paul Tracy	Forsythe Racing	59.759	59.432	59.432
2	(France)	Sébastien Bourdais	Newman/Haas Racing	1:00.347	59.541	59.541
3	(Mexico)	Mario Domínguez	Forsythe Racing	1:00.213	59.644	59.644
4	(United States)	A. J. Allmendinger	RuSPORT	1:00.612	59.938	59.938
5	(United Kingdom)	Justin Wilson	RuSPORT	1:00.697	59.962	59.962
6	(United States)	Jimmy Vasser	PKV Racing	1:01.389	59.995	59.995
7	(Canada)	Alex Tagliani	Team Australia	1:01.257	1:00.156	1:00.156
8	(Spain)	Oriol Servià	Newman/Haas Racing	1:01.043	1:00.331	1:00.331
9	(Brazil)	Cristiano da Matta	PKV Racing	1:01.214	1:00.493	1:00.493
10	(Germany)	Timo Glock	Rocketsports Racing	1:00.957	1:00.529	1:00.529
11	(Canada)	Andrew Ranger	Mi-Jack Conquest Racing	1:02.235	1:00.704	1:00.704
12	(Brazil)	Ricardo Sperafico	Dale Coyne Racing	1:01.745	1:00.732	1:00.732
13	(Mexico)	Rodolfo Lavín	HVM Racing	1:01.029	1:00.766	1:00.766
14	(Sweden)	Björn Wirdheim	HVM Racing	1:00.980	1:00.863	1:00.863
15	(France)	Nelson Philippe	Mi-Jack Conquest Racing	1:01.434	1:00.915	1:00.915
16	(Denmark)	Ronnie Bremer	Dale Coyne Racing	1:01.630	1:01.093	1:01.093
17	(United States)	Ryan Hunter-Reay	Rocketsports Racing	1:01.342	1:01.438	1:01.342
18	(Australia)	Marcus Marshall	Team Australia	1:02.651	1:02.064	1:02.064

== Race ==
Pos	No	Driver	Team	Laps	Time/Retired	Grid	Points
1	1	(France) Sébastien Bourdais	Newman/Haas Racing	97	1:49:45.135	2	33
2	7	(Mexico) Mario Domínguez	Forsythe Racing	97	+15.269 secs	3	27
3	10	(United States) A. J. Allmendinger	RuSPORT	97	+17.207 secs	4	25
4	2	(Spain) Oriol Servià	Newman/Haas Racing	97	+35.775 secs	8	23
5	55	(Mexico) Rodolfo Lavín	HVM Racing	97	+37.629 secs	13	21
6	31	(United States) Ryan Hunter-Reay	Rocketsports Racing	97	+43.237 secs	17	20
7	19	(Denmark) Ronnie Bremer	Dale Coyne Racing	97	+47.487 secs	16	17
8	11	(Brazil) Ricardo Sperafico	Dale Coyne Racing	97	+52.470 secs	12	15
9	34	(France) Nelson Philippe	Mi-Jack Conquest Racing	97	+1:02.902	15	13
10	27	(Canada) Andrew Ranger	Mi-Jack Conquest Racing	96	+ 1 Lap	11	11
11	4	(Sweden) Björn Wirdheim	HVM Racing	96	+ 1 Lap	14	10
12	5	(Australia) Marcus Marshall	Team Australia	94	+ 3 Laps	18	9
13	8	(Germany) Timo Glock	Rocketsports Racing	88	Gearbox	10	8
14	15	(Canada) Alex Tagliani	Team Australia	82	+ 15 Laps	7	7
15	12	(United States) Jimmy Vasser	PKV Racing	65	In pits	6	6
16	3	(Canada) Paul Tracy	Forsythe Racing	62	Contact	1	8
17	9	(United Kingdom) Justin Wilson	RuSPORT	0	Contact	5	4
18	21	(Brazil) Cristiano da Matta	PKV Racing	0	Contact	9	3

== Caution flags ==
Laps	Cause
1-5	da Matta (21), Wilson (9), Tagliani (15) & Vasser (12) contact
63-69	Tracy (3) contact

== Notes ==
Laps	Leader
1-39	Paul Tracy
40-42	Sébastien Bourdais
43-62	Paul Tracy
63-97	Sébastien Bourdais

Driver	Laps led
Paul Tracy	59
Sébastien Bourdais	38

- New Track Record Paul Tracy 59.432 (Qualification Session #2)
- New Race Lap Record Sébastien Bourdais 1:00.574
- New Race Record Sébastien Bourdais 1:49:45.135
- Average Speed 87.868 mph

== Championship standings after the race ==
Drivers' Championship standings

	Pos	Driver	Points
	1	(France) Sébastien Bourdais	249
	2	(Canada) Paul Tracy	196
1	3	(Spain) Oriol Servià	183
1	4	(United Kingdom) Justin Wilson	179
1	5	(Mexico) Mario Domínguez	152

- Note: Only the top five positions are included.

Previous race: 2005 Taylor Woodrow Grand Prix of San Jose	Champ Car World Series; 2005 season	Next race: 2005 Molson Indy Montreal
Previous race: 2004 Centrix Financial Grand Prix of Denver	2005 Centrix Financial Grand Prix of Denver	Next race: 2006 Grand Prix of Denver
