= 2005 Grand Prix of Cleveland =

Coordinates: 41°31′2.3″N 81°40′58.5″W

(United States) 2005 Cleveland
Race details
- Race 5 of 13 in the 2005 Champ Car season
- Burke Lakefront Airport Track Layout
- Date: June 26, 2005
- Official name: Champ Car Grand Prix of Cleveland Presented by U.S. Bank
- Location: Burke Lakefront Airport; Cleveland, Ohio, United States
- Course: Temporary Airport Course; 2.106 mi / 3.389 km
- Distance: 91 laps 191.646 mi / 308.399 km
- Weather: Hazy with temperatures reaching up to 90 °F (32 °C); wind speeds reaching up to 8 miles per hour (13 km/h)

Pole position
- Driver: (Canada) Paul Tracy (Forsythe Championship Racing)
- Time: 57.419

Fastest lap
- Driver: (Spain) Oriol Servià (Newman/Haas Racing)
- Time: 58.616 (on lap 90 of 91)

Podium
- First: (Canada) Paul Tracy (Forsythe Championship Racing)
- Second: (United States) A. J. Allmendinger (RuSPORT)
- Third: (Spain) Oriol Servià (Newman/Haas Racing)

The 2005 Champ Car Grand Prix of Cleveland was the fifth round of the 2005 Bridgestone Presents the Champ Car World Series Powered by Ford season, held on June 26, 2005 at Burke Lakefront Airport in Cleveland, Ohio. Due to the controversy at the 2005 United States Grand Prix held at Indianapolis a week earlier, any fan who had a ticket to the 2005 United States GP was granted free admission to this race. Paul Tracy swept both the pole and the race win, his second victory of the season.

== Qualifying results ==
Pos	Nat	Name	Team	Qual 1	Qual 2	Best
1	(Canada)	Paul Tracy	Forsythe Racing	58.440	57.419	57.419
2	(Brazil)	Cristiano da Matta	PKV Racing	58.436	57.424	57.424
3	(France)	Sébastien Bourdais	Newman/Haas Racing	58.576	57.559	57.559
4	(Canada)	Andrew Ranger	Mi-Jack Conquest Racing	59.581	57.801	57.801
5	(Canada)	Alex Tagliani	Team Australia	58.705	57.836	57.836
6	(Spain)	Oriol Servià	Newman/Haas Racing	58.920	57.917	57.917
7	(Mexico)	Mario Domínguez	Forsythe Racing	58.546	57.942	57.942
8	(United States)	Jimmy Vasser	PKV Racing	58.835	58.029	58.029
9	(United States)	A. J. Allmendinger	RuSPORT	59.158	58.126	58.126
10	(Brazil)	Tarso Marques	Dale Coyne Racing	59.819	58.335	58.335
11	(Germany)	Timo Glock	Rocketsports Racing	59.346	58.385	58.385
12	(Denmark)	Ronnie Bremer	HVM Racing	59.435	58.471	58.471
13	(Sweden)	Björn Wirdheim	HVM Racing	59.970	58.493	58.493
14	(United States)	Ryan Hunter-Reay	Rocketsports Racing	59.395	58.693	58.693
15	(France)	Nelson Philippe	Mi-Jack Conquest Racing	59.789	58.844	58.844
16	(United Kingdom)	Justin Wilson	RuSPORT	58.986	1:10.166	58.986
17	(Brazil)	Ricardo Sperafico	Dale Coyne Racing	1:00.390	59.128	59.128
18	(Australia)	Marcus Marshall	Team Australia	1:01.135	59.200	59.200

== Race ==
Pos	No	Driver	Team	Laps	Time/Retired	Grid	Points
1	3	(Canada) Paul Tracy	Forsythe Racing	91	1:45:43.856	1	33
2	10	(United States) A. J. Allmendinger	RuSPORT	91	+3.113 secs	9	28
3	2	(Spain) Oriol Servià	Newman/Haas Racing	91	+3.914 secs	6	26
4	15	(Canada) Alex Tagliani	Team Australia	91	+10.185 secs	5	24
5	1	(France) Sébastien Bourdais	Newman/Haas Racing	91	+13.262 secs	3	21
6	12	(United States) Jimmy Vasser	PKV Racing	91	+20.361 secs	8	19
7	9	(United Kingdom) Justin Wilson	RuSPORT	91	+23.489 secs	16	18
8	27	(Canada) Andrew Ranger	Mi-Jack Conquest Racing	91	+25.212 secs	4	15
9	11	(Brazil) Ricardo Sperafico	Dale Coyne Racing	91	+31.736 secs	17	13
10	8	(Germany) Timo Glock	Rocketsports Racing	91	+47.725 secs	11	11
11	19	(Brazil) Tarso Marques	Dale Coyne Racing	90	+ 1 Lap	10	10
12	5	(Australia) Marcus Marshall	Team Australia	89	+ 2 Laps	18	9
13	34	(France) Nelson Philippe	Mi-Jack Conquest Racing	89	+ 2 Laps	15	8
14	55	(Denmark) Ronnie Bremer	HVM Racing	80	Engine	12	7
15	4	(Sweden) Björn Wirdheim	HVM Racing	51	Contact	13	6
16	21	(Brazil) Cristiano da Matta	PKV Racing	50	Contact	2	7
17	7	(Mexico) Mario Domínguez	Forsythe Racing	38	Contact	7	4
18	31	(United States) Ryan Hunter-Reay	Rocketsports Racing	1	Contact	14	3

== Caution flags ==
Laps	Cause
1-3	Wirdheim (4) & Hunter-Reay (31) contact
26-33	Domínguez (7) & Wilson (9) contact
36-37	Debris
54-59	Wirdheim (4) contact

== Notes ==
Laps	Leader
1-29	Paul Tracy
30-50	Cristiano da Matta
51-56	Paul Tracy
57-75	A. J. Allmendinger
76-80	Paul Tracy
81-85	Alex Tagliani
86-91	Paul Tracy

Driver	Laps led
Paul Tracy	46
Cristiano da Matta	21
A. J. Allmendinger	19
Alex Tagliani	5

- New Race Record Paul Tracy 1:45:43.856
- Average Speed 108.755 mph

== Championship standings after the race ==
Drivers' Championship standings

	Pos	Driver	Points
1	1	(Canada) Paul Tracy	128
1	2	(France) Sébastien Bourdais	127
1	3	(United States) A. J. Allmendinger	102
1	4	(United Kingdom) Justin Wilson	95
2	5	(United States) Jimmy Vasser	82

- Note: Only the top five positions are included.

Previous race: 2005 G.I. Joe's Champ Car Grand Prix of Portland	Champ Car World Series; 2005 season	Next race: 2005 Molson Indy Toronto
Previous race: 2004 U.S. Bank Champ Car Grand Prix of Cleveland	2005 Champ Car Grand Prix of Cleveland	Next race: 2006 Grand Prix of Cleveland
