= 2005 Time Warner Cable Road Runner 225 =

Coordinates: 43.02°N 88.01°W

(United States) 2005 Milwaukee
Race details
- Race 3 of 13 in the 2005 Champ Car season
- Milwaukee Mile Track Layout
- Date: June 4, 2005
- Official name: Time Warner Cable Road Runner 225 Presented by US Bank
- Location: Milwaukee Mile, West Allis, Wisconsin, United States
- Course: 1 Mile Oval; 1.000 mi / 1.609 km
- Distance: 221 laps 221 mi / 355.665 km
- Weather: Warm and Hazy

Pole position
- Driver: (United States) Jimmy Vasser (PKV Racing)
- Time: 21.081

Fastest lap
- Driver: (Canada) Paul Tracy (Forsythe Championship Racing)
- Time: 22.208 (on lap 221 of 221)

Podium
- First: (Canada) Paul Tracy (Forsythe Championship Racing)
- Second: (United States) A. J. Allmendinger (RuSPORT)
- Third: (Spain) Oriol Servià (Newman/Haas Racing)

Chronology
Previous	Next
2004	2006

The 2005 Time Warner Cable Road Runner 225 was the third round of the 2005 Bridgestone Presents the Champ Car World Series Powered by Ford season, held on June 4, 2005 at the Milwaukee Mile in West Allis, Wisconsin. Jimmy Vasser was the pole sitter while Paul Tracy won the race. Vasser's pole position was the ninth and final of his career.

== Qualifying results ==
Pos	Nat	Name	Team	Best Lap	Time
1	(United States)	Jimmy Vasser	PKV Racing	1	21.081
2	(United States)	A. J. Allmendinger	RuSPORT	2	21.109
3	(United Kingdom)	Justin Wilson	RuSPORT	1	21.125
4	(Brazil)	Cristiano da Matta	PKV Racing	1	21.261
5	(Canada)	Paul Tracy	Forsythe Racing	2	21.268
6	(France)	Sébastien Bourdais	Newman/Haas Racing	1	21.356
7	(United States)	Ryan Hunter-Reay	Rocketsports Racing	2	21.454
8	(Sweden)	Björn Wirdheim	HVM Racing	2	21.584
9	(Spain)	Oriol Servià	Newman/Haas Racing	2	21.609
10	(Mexico)	Mario Domínguez	Forsythe Racing	2	21.632
11	(Canada)	Alex Tagliani	Team Australia	2	21.722
12	(France)	Nelson Philippe	Mi-Jack Conquest Racing	1	21.883
13	(Canada)	Andrew Ranger	Mi-Jack Conquest Racing	1	21.954
14	(Germany)	Timo Glock	Rocketsports Racing	2	22.281
15	(Australia)	Marcus Marshall	Team Australia	1	22.283
16	(Denmark)	Ronnie Bremer	HVM Racing	2	22.424
17	(Brazil)	Ricardo Sperafico	Dale Coyne Racing	1	23.379

== Race ==
Pos	No	Driver	Team	Laps	Time/Retired	Grid	Points
1	3	(Canada) Paul Tracy	Forsythe Racing	221	1:45:01.259	5	33
2	10	(United States) A. J. Allmendinger	RuSPORT	221	+3.370 secs	2	27
3	2	(Spain) Oriol Servià	Newman/Haas Racing	221	+6.121 secs	9	25
4	9	(United Kingdom) Justin Wilson	RuSPORT	221	+6.859 secs	3	23
5	12	(United States) Jimmy Vasser	PKV Racing	221	+8.332 secs	1	23
6	1	(France) Sébastien Bourdais	Newman/Haas Racing	220	+ 1 Lap	6	19
7	7	(Mexico) Mario Domínguez	Forsythe Racing	220	+ 1 Lap	10	18
8	55	(Denmark) Ronnie Bremer	HVM Racing	220	+ 1 Lap	16	17
9	8	(Germany) Timo Glock	Rocketsports Racing	219	+ 2 Laps	14	13
10	15	(Canada) Alex Tagliani	Team Australia	218	+ 3 Laps	11	11
11	21	(Brazil) Cristiano da Matta	PKV Racing	217	+ 4 Laps	4	10
12	34	(France) Nelson Philippe	Mi-Jack Conquest Racing	216	+ 5 Laps	12	9
13	5	(Australia) Marcus Marshall	Team Australia	216	+ 5 Laps	15	8
14	19	(Brazil) Ricardo Sperafico	Dale Coyne Racing	211	+ 10 Laps	17	7
15	4	(Sweden) Björn Wirdheim	HVM Racing	174	Suspension	8	6
16	27	(Canada) Andrew Ranger	Mi-Jack Conquest Racing	125	Contact	13	5
17	31	(United States) Ryan Hunter-Reay	Rocketsports Racing	5	Contact	7	4

== Caution flags ==
Laps	Cause
6-18	Hunter-Reay (31) contact
128-138	Ranger (27) contact
210-215	Debris

== Notes ==
Laps	Leader
1-18	Jimmy Vasser
19-74	Paul Tracy
75	Mario Domínguez
76-84	Ronnie Bremer
85-202	Paul Tracy
203	Ronnie Bremer
204-221	Paul Tracy

Driver	Laps led
Paul Tracy	192
Jimmy Vasser	18
Ronnie Bremer	10
Mario Domínguez	1

- Average Speed 130.301 mph
- Race shortened by Champ Car rule limiting races to one hour, forty-five minutes.

== Championship standings after the race ==
Drivers' Championship standings

	Pos	Driver	Points
1	1	(France) Sébastien Bourdais	77
1	2	(United Kingdom) Justin Wilson	70
1	3	(Canada) Paul Tracy	69
3	4	(Brazil) Bruno Junqueira	59
5	5	(United States) A. J. Allmendinger	53

- Note: Only the top five positions are included.

Previous race: 2005 Tecate/Telmex Grand Prix of Monterrey	Champ Car World Series; 2005 season	Next race: 2005 G.I. Joe's Champ Car Grand Prix of Portland
Previous race: 2004 Time Warner Cable Road Runner 250	Milwaukee Mile	Next race: 2006 Time Warner Cable Road Runner 225
