= 2005 West Edmonton Mall Grand Prix of Edmonton =

Coordinates: 53°34′32″N 113°31′22.5″W

(Canada) 2005 West Edmonton Mall Grand Prix of Edmonton
Race details
- Race 7 of 13 in the 2005 Champ Car season
- Date: July 17, 2005
- Official name: West Edmonton Mall Grand Prix of Edmonton
- Location: Finning International Speedway; Edmonton, Alberta, Canada
- Course: Temporary Airport Course; 1.973 mi / 3.175 km
- Distance: 88 laps 173.624 mi / 279.400 km
- Weather: Partly cloudy with temperatures reaching up to 24 °C (75 °F)

Pole position
- Driver: (United States) A. J. Allmendinger ( (United States) RuSPORT)
- Time: 58.628

Fastest lap
- Driver: (United States) A. J. Allmendinger ( (United States) RuSPORT)
- Time: 59.900 (on lap 51 of 88)

Podium
- First: (France) Sébastien Bourdais ( (France) Newman/Haas Racing)
- Second: (Spain) Oriol Servià ( (Spain) Newman/Haas Racing)
- Third: (Canada) Paul Tracy ( (Canada) Forsythe Championship Racing)

The 2005 West Edmonton Mall Grand Prix of Edmonton was the seventh round of the 2005 Bridgestone Presents: the Champ Car World Series Powered by Ford season, held on July 17, 2005, at Finning International Speedway, a temporary course laid out at Edmonton City Centre Airport in Edmonton, Alberta, Canada. A. J. Allmendinger won the pole, the first of his career, and Sébastien Bourdais was the race winner.

== Qualifying results ==
Pos	Nat	Name	Team	Qual 1	Qual 2	Best
1	(United States)	A. J. Allmendinger	RuSPORT	58.628	1:01.070	58.628
2	(United Kingdom)	Justin Wilson	RuSPORT	58.954	—	58.954
3	(Canada)	Paul Tracy	Forsythe Racing	59.497	1:01.529	59.497
4	(Spain)	Oriol Servià	Newman/Haas Racing	59.592	1:08.689	59.592
5	(Brazil)	Cristiano da Matta	PKV Racing	59.769	9:08.142	59.769
6	(Canada)	Alex Tagliani	Team Australia	59.782	—	59.782
7	(United States)	Jimmy Vasser	PKV Racing	59.873	—	59.873
8	(Mexico)	Mario Domínguez	Forsythe Racing	59.990	1:04.774	59.990
9	(Germany)	Timo Glock (R)	Rocketsports Racing	1:00.121	8:09.776	1:00.121
10	(France)	Sébastien Bourdais	Newman/Haas Racing	1:00.462	1:02.799	1:00.462
11	(Sweden)	Björn Wirdheim (R)	HVM Racing	1:00.569	9:11.405	1:00.569
12	(France)	Nelson Philippe	Mi-Jack Conquest Racing	1:00.777	1:04.065	1:00.777
13	(Brazil)	Ricardo Sperafico (R)	Dale Coyne Racing	1:00.884	1:03.512	1:00.884
14	(United States)	Ryan Hunter-Reay	Rocketsports Racing	1:00.916	1:03.593	1:00.916
15	(Canada)	Andrew Ranger (R)	Mi-Jack Conquest Racing	1:01.271	1:03.698	1:01.271
16	(Denmark)	Ronnie Bremer (R)	Dale Coyne Racing	1:01.349	1:02.184	1:01.349
17	(Brazil)	Alex Sperafico	HVM Racing	1:01.984	1:06.247	1:01.984
18	(Australia)	Marcus Marshall (R)	Team Australia	1:03.811	1:03.823	1:03.811

== Race ==
Pos	No	Driver	Team	Laps	Time/Retired	Grid	Points
1	1	(France) Sébastien Bourdais	Newman/Haas Racing	88	1:38:55.730	10	32
2	2	(Spain) Oriol Servià	Newman/Haas Racing	88	+0.596 secs	4	28
3	3	(Canada) Paul Tracy	Forsythe Racing	88	+1.335 secs	3	26
4	9	(United Kingdom) Justin Wilson	RuSPORT	88	+1.615 secs	2	24
5	7	(Mexico) Mario Domínguez	Forsythe Racing	88	+12.042 secs	8	21
6	19	(Denmark) Ronnie Bremer (R)	Dale Coyne Racing	88	+12.397 secs	16	20
7	15	(Canada) Alex Tagliani	Team Australia	87	+ 1 Lap	6	17
8	5	(Australia) Marcus Marshall (R)	Team Australia	87	+ 1 Lap	18	15
9	34	(France) Nelson Philippe	Mi-Jack Conquest Racing	87	+ 1 Lap	12	13
10	11	(Brazil) Ricardo Sperafico (R)	Dale Coyne Racing	87	+ 1 Lap	13	11
11	12	(United States) Jimmy Vasser	PKV Racing	86	+ 2 Laps	7	10
12	55	(Brazil) Alex Sperafico	HVM Racing	86	+ 2 Laps	17	9
13	8	(Germany) Timo Glock (R)	Rocketsports Racing	83	Contact	9	8
14	10	(United States) A. J. Allmendinger	RuSPORT	80	Contact	1	11
15	4	(Sweden) Björn Wirdheim (R)	HVM Racing	74	Contact	11	6
16	31	(United States) Ryan Hunter-Reay	Rocketsports Racing	51	Out of fuel	14	5
17	21	(Brazil) Cristiano da Matta	PKV Racing	7	Suspension	5	4
18	27	(Canada) Andrew Ranger (R)	Mi-Jack Conquest Racing	3	Suspension	15	3

== Caution flags ==
Laps	Cause
26-29	Vasser (12) off course
30	Tracy (3) improper restart procedure
76-79	Wirdheim (4) contact

== Notes ==
Laps	Leader
1-18	A. J. Allmendinger
19-48	Paul Tracy
49-52	Justin Wilson
53-57	A. J. Allmendinger
58-59	Oriol Servià
60-62	Sébastien Bourdais
63-79	A. J. Allmendinger
80-88	Sébastien Bourdais

Driver	Laps led
A. J. Allmendinger	40
Paul Tracy	30
Sébastien Bourdais	12
Justin Wilson	4
Oriol Servià	2

- New Track Record A. J. Allmendinger 58.628 (Qualification Session #1)
- New Race Lap Record A. J. Allmendinger 59.900
- New Race Record Sébastien Bourdais 1:38:55.730
- Average Speed 105.302 mph

== Championship standings after the race ==
Drivers' Championship standings

	Pos	Driver	Points
	1	(France) Sébastien Bourdais	182
	2	(Canada) Paul Tracy	161
	3	(United Kingdom) Justin Wilson	152
1	4	(Spain) Oriol Servià	135
1	5	(United States) A. J. Allmendinger	122

- Note: Only the top five positions are included.

Previous race: 2005 Molson Indy Toronto	Champ Car World Series; 2005 season	Next race: 2005 Taylor Woodrow Grand Prix of San Jose
Previous race: First Event	2005 West Edmonton Mall Grand Prix of Edmonton	Next race: 2006 West Edmonton Mall Grand Prix of Edmonton
