= 2005 Taylor Woodrow Grand Prix of San Jose =

Coordinates: 37°19′41″N 121°53′26″W

(United States) 2005 San Jose
Race details
- Race 8 of 13 in the 2005 Champ Car season
- San Jose Track Layout
- Date: July 31, 2005
- Official name: Taylor Woodrow Grand Prix of San Jose
- Location: Streets of San Jose; San Jose, California, United States
- Course: Temporary Street Course; 1.448 mi / 2.330 km
- Distance: 93 laps 134.664 mi / 216.690 km
- Weather: Partly Cloudy with temperatures reaching up to 84 °F (29 °C); wind speeds reaching up to 10.1 miles per hour (16.3 km/h)

Pole position
- Driver: (France) Sébastien Bourdais (Newman/Haas Racing)
- Time: 54.243

Fastest lap
- Driver: (France) Sébastien Bourdais (Newman/Haas Racing)
- Time: 55.083 (on lap 90 of 93)

Podium
- First: (France) Sébastien Bourdais (Newman/Haas Racing)
- Second: (Canada) Paul Tracy (Forsythe Championship Racing)
- Third: (Spain) Oriol Servià (Newman/Haas Racing)

The 2005 Taylor Woodrow Grand Prix of San Jose was the eighth round of the 2005 Bridgestone Presents the Champ Car World Series Powered by Ford season, held on July 31, 2005 on the streets of San Jose, California. Sébastien Bourdais swept both the pole and the race win. The race was notable for the large bump on the main straight where a light rail track crossed the course, the bump being large enough to cause the cars to catch air.

== Qualifying results ==
Because of circuit construction issues on Friday, the Qualification 1 session was canceled. Only times from Saturday's Qualification 2 session were used to set the grid for the race.

Pos	Nat	Name	Team	Time
1	(France)	Sébastien Bourdais	Newman/Haas Racing	54.243
2	(Spain)	Oriol Servià	Newman/Haas Racing	54.305
3	(Canada)	Paul Tracy	Forsythe Racing	54.570
4	(United States)	A. J. Allmendinger	RuSPORT	54.604
5	(Mexico)	Mario Domínguez	Forsythe Racing	54.654
6	(France)	Nelson Philippe	Mi-Jack Conquest Racing	54.878
7	(Germany)	Timo Glock	Rocketsports Racing	54.895
8	(Sweden)	Björn Wirdheim	HVM Racing	55.054
9	(United Kingdom)	Justin Wilson	RuSPORT	55.093
10	(United States)	Jimmy Vasser	PKV Racing	55.414
11	(Canada)	Andrew Ranger	Mi-Jack Conquest Racing	55.434
12	(Mexico)	Rodolfo Lavín	HVM Racing	55.449
13	(Brazil)	Cristiano da Matta	PKV Racing	55.773
14	(Brazil)	Ricardo Sperafico	Dale Coyne Racing	55.972
15	(United States)	Ryan Hunter-Reay	Rocketsports Racing	56.019
16	(Denmark)	Ronnie Bremer	Dale Coyne Racing	56.452
17	(Canada)	Alex Tagliani	Team Australia	56.616
18	(Australia)	Marcus Marshall	Team Australia	57.687

== Race ==
Pos	No	Driver	Team	Laps	Time/Retired	Grid	Points
1	1	(France) Sébastien Bourdais	Newman/Haas Racing	93	1:45:42.889	1	34
2	3	(Canada) Paul Tracy	Forsythe Racing	93	+3.724 secs	3	27
3	2	(Spain) Oriol Servià	Newman/Haas Racing	93	+10.383 secs	2	25
4	9	(United Kingdom) Justin Wilson	RuSPORT	93	+11.323 secs	9	23
5	7	(Mexico) Mario Domínguez	Forsythe Racing	93	+11.917 secs	5	21
6	8	(Germany) Timo Glock	Rocketsports Racing	93	+15.260 secs	7	19
7	19	(Denmark) Ronnie Bremer	Dale Coyne Racing	93	+16.391 secs	16	19
8	4	(Sweden) Björn Wirdheim	HVM Racing	93	+19.443 secs	8	16
9	15	(Canada) Alex Tagliani	Team Australia	89	+ 4 Laps	17	13
10	21	(Brazil) Cristiano da Matta	PKV Racing	77	Contact	13	11
11	12	(United States) Jimmy Vasser	PKV Racing	60	Suspension	10	10
12	5	(Australia) Marcus Marshall	Team Australia	52	Mechanical	18	9
13	55	(Mexico) Rodolfo Lavín	HVM Racing	40	Contact	12	8
14	31	(United States) Ryan Hunter-Reay	Rocketsports Racing	36	Suspension	15	7
15	34	(France) Nelson Philippe	Mi-Jack Conquest Racing	20	Oil pressure	6	6
16	27	(Canada) Andrew Ranger	Mi-Jack Conquest Racing	13	Contact	11	5
17	10	(United States) A. J. Allmendinger	RuSPORT	12	Contact	4	4
18	11	(Brazil) Ricardo Sperafico	Dale Coyne Racing	0	Contact	14	3

== Caution flags ==
Laps	Cause
2-5	Sperafico (11) contact
26-33	Debris
58-65	Hunter-Reay (31) stopped on course
66	Yellow restart
78-83	da Matta (21) contact

== Notes ==
Laps	Leader
1-28	Sébastien Bourdais
29-47	Ronnie Bremer
48-60	Sébastien Bourdais
61-71	Björn Wirdheim
72-93	Sébastien Bourdais

Driver	Laps led
Sébastien Bourdais	63
Ronnie Bremer	19
Björn Wirdheim	11

- New Track Record Sébastien Bourdais 54.243 (Qualification Session)
- New Race Lap Record Sébastien Bourdais 55.083
- New Race Record Sébastien Bourdais 1:45:42.889
- Average Speed 76.431 mph

== Championship standings after the race ==
Drivers' Championship standings

Pos	Driver	Points
1	(France) Sébastien Bourdais	216
2	(Canada) Paul Tracy	188
3	(United Kingdom) Justin Wilson	175
4	(Spain) Oriol Servià	160
5	(United States) A. J. Allmendinger	126

- Note: Only the top five positions are included.

Previous race: 2005 West Edmonton Mall Grand Prix of Edmonton	Champ Car World Series; 2005 season	Next race: 2005 Centrix Financial Grand Prix of Denver
Previous race: First Event	2005 Taylor Woodrow Grand Prix of San Jose	Next race: 2006 Canary Foundation Grand Prix of San Jose
