= 2005 G.I. Joe's Champ Car Grand Prix of Portland =

Coordinates: 45°35′49″N 122°41′45″W

(United States) 2005 Portland
Race details
- Race 4 of 13 in the 2005 Champ Car season
- Portland International Raceway Track Layout
- Date: June 19, 2005
- Official name: G.I. Joe's Presents the Champ Car Grand Prix of Portland
- Location: Portland International Raceway; Portland, Oregon, United States
- Course: Permanent Road Course; 1.964 mi / 3.161 km
- Distance: 105 laps 206.220 mi / 331.905 km
- Weather: Sunny and Warm

Pole position
- Driver: (United Kingdom) Justin Wilson (RuSPORT)
- Time: 57.597

Fastest lap
- Driver: (France) Sébastien Bourdais (Newman/Haas Racing)
- Time: 59.923 (on lap 79 of 105)

Podium
- First: (Brazil) Cristiano da Matta (PKV Racing)
- Second: (France) Sébastien Bourdais (Newman/Haas Racing)
- Third: (Canada) Paul Tracy (Forsythe Championship Racing)

The 2005 G.I. Joe's Presents the Champ Car Grand Prix of Portland was the fourth round of the 2005 Bridgestone Presents the Champ Car World Series Powered by Ford season, held on June 19, 2005 at the Portland International Raceway in Portland, Oregon. The pole sitter was Justin Wilson and the race was won by Cristiano da Matta. It marked the 12th and final Champ Car victory for the 2002 CART champion. It was also the first career Champ Car pole for Wilson, the first of eight in his American open wheel career.

== Qualifying results ==
Pos	Nat	Name	Team	Qual 1	Qual 2	Best
1	(United Kingdom)	Justin Wilson	RuSPORT	57.597	57.808	57.597
2	(United States)	A. J. Allmendinger	RuSPORT	57.816	57.897	57.816
3	(Canada)	Paul Tracy	Forsythe Racing	57.911	58.253	57.911
4	(Canada)	Alex Tagliani	Team Australia	57.956	58.463	57.956
5	(France)	Sébastien Bourdais	Newman/Haas Racing	57.989	58.073	57.989
6	(Mexico)	Mario Domínguez	Forsythe Racing	58.093	58.329	58.093
7	(Canada)	Andrew Ranger	Mi-Jack Conquest Racing	58.097	58.423	58.097
8	(United States)	Jimmy Vasser	PKV Racing	58.134	58.497	58.134
9	(Denmark)	Ronnie Bremer	HVM Racing	58.331	59.895	58.331
10	(Brazil)	Cristiano da Matta	PKV Racing	58.344	58.343	58.343
11	(Germany)	Timo Glock	Rocketsports Racing	58.407	59.190	58.407
12	(Spain)	Oriol Servià	Newman/Haas Racing	58.828	58.669	58.669
13	(Sweden)	Björn Wirdheim	HVM Racing	58.759	58.920	58.759
14	(Brazil)	Ricardo Sperafico	Dale Coyne Racing	58.894	58.941	58.894
15	(Canada)	Michael Valiante	Dale Coyne Racing	59.055	59.318	59.055
16	(United States)	Ryan Hunter-Reay	Rocketsports Racing	59.140	59.262	59.140
17	(France)	Nelson Philippe	Mi-Jack Conquest Racing	—*	59.345	59.345
18	(Australia)	Marcus Marshall	Team Australia	59.362	59.612	59.362

* Nelson Philippe crashed in practice before the first qualifying session and was not able to set a time.

== Race ==
Pos	No	Driver	Team	Laps	Time/Retired	Grid	Points
1	21	(Brazil) Cristiano da Matta	PKV Racing	105	1:51:51.404	10	33
2	1	(France) Sébastien Bourdais	Newman/Haas Racing	105	+10.128 secs	5	29
3	3	(Canada) Paul Tracy	Forsythe Racing	105	+17.570 secs	3	26
4	7	(Mexico) Mario Domínguez	Forsythe Racing	105	+18.640 secs	6	23
5	10	(United States) A. J. Allmendinger	RuSPORT	105	+26.708 secs	2	21
6	12	(United States) Jimmy Vasser	PKV Racing	105	+33.477 secs	8	19
7	27	(Canada) Andrew Ranger	Mi-Jack Conquest Racing	105	+40.345 secs	7	17
8	55	(Denmark) Ronnie Bremer	HVM Racing	104	+ 1 Lap	9	15
9	4	(Sweden) Björn Wirdheim	HVM Racing	104	+ 1 Lap	13	13
10	8	(Germany) Timo Glock	Rocketsports Racing	104	+ 1 Lap	11	11
11	19	(Canada) Michael Valiante	Dale Coyne Racing	104	+ 1 Lap	15	10
12	34	(France) Nelson Philippe	Mi-Jack Conquest Racing	104	+ 1 Lap	17	9
13	11	(Brazil) Ricardo Sperafico	Dale Coyne Racing	104	+ 1 Lap	14	8
14	5	(Australia) Marcus Marshall	Team Australia	103	+ 2 Laps	18	7
15	31	(United States) Ryan Hunter-Reay	Rocketsports Racing	103	+ 2 Laps	16	6
16	2	(Spain) Oriol Servià	Newman/Haas Racing	79	Drive shaft	12	5
17	9	(United Kingdom) Justin Wilson	RuSPORT	45	Oil pump	1	7
18	15	(Canada) Alex Tagliani	Team Australia	8	Engine	4	3

== Caution flags ==
Laps	Cause
47-51	Wilson (9) off course

== Notes ==
Laps	Leader
1-29	Justin Wilson
30	Paul Tracy
31	Sébastien Bourdais
32-45	Justin Wilson
46-48	Paul Tracy
49-74	Cristiano da Matta
75-80	Sébastien Bourdais
81	Paul Tracy
82-105	Cristiano da Matta

Driver	Laps led
Cristiano da Matta	50
Justin Wilson	43
Sébastien Bourdais	7
Paul Tracy	5

- New Track Record Justin Wilson 57.597 (Qualification Session #1)
- New Race Lap Record Sébastien Bourdais 59.923
- New Race Record Cristiano da Matta 1:51:51.404
- Average Speed 110.616 mph

== Championship standings after the race ==
Drivers' Championship standings

	Pos	Driver	Points
	1	(France) Sébastien Bourdais	106
1	2	(Canada) Paul Tracy	95
1	3	(United Kingdom) Justin Wilson	77
1	4	(United States) A. J. Allmendinger	74
6	5	(Brazil) Cristiano da Matta	73

- Note: Only the top five positions are included.

Previous race: 2005 Time Warner Cable Road Runner 225	Champ Car World Series; 2005 season	Next race: 2005 Grand Prix of Cleveland
Previous race: 2004 Champ Car Grand Prix of Portland	2005 Champ Car Grand Prix of Portland	Next race: 2006 Grand Prix of Portland
