= 2005 Molson Indy Montreal =

10th round of 2005 Champ Car season

(Canada) 2005 Montreal
Race details
- Race 10 of 13 in the 2005 Champ Car season
- Circuit Gilles Villeneuve Track Layout
- Date: August 28, 2005
- Official name: Molson Indy Montreal
- Location: Circuit Gilles Villeneuve; Montreal, Quebec, Canada
- Course: Permanent Road Course; 2.709 mi / 4.360 km
- Distance: 79 laps 214.011 mi / 344.440 km
- Weather: Partly cloudy with temperatures reaching up to 29 °C (84 °F); negligible amounts of wind reported throughout the day

Pole position
- Driver: (France) Sébastien Bourdais (Newman/Haas Racing)
- Time: 1:20.396

Fastest lap
- Driver: (France) Sébastien Bourdais (Newman/Haas Racing)
- Time: 1:21.667 (on lap 40 of 79)

Podium
- First: (Spain) Oriol Servià (Newman/Haas Racing)
- Second: (Germany) Timo Glock (Rocketsports Racing)
- Third: (United Kingdom) Justin Wilson (RuSPORT)

The 2005 Molson Indy Montreal was the tenth round of the 2005 Champ Car season, held on August 28, 2005 at Circuit Gilles Villeneuve in Montreal, Quebec, Canada. Sébastien Bourdais was the polesitter and Oriol Servià won the race. It was Servià's only victory in major American open wheel competition.

== Qualifying results ==
Pos	Nat	Name	Team	Qual 1	Qual 2	Best
1	(France)	Sébastien Bourdais	Newman/Haas Racing	1:21.924	1:20.396	1:20.396
2	(Spain)	Oriol Servià	Newman/Haas Racing	1:22.010	1:20.698	1:20.698
3	(United Kingdom)	Justin Wilson	RuSPORT	1:22.851	1:20.932	1:20.932
4	(United States)	A. J. Allmendinger	RuSPORT	1:26.100	1:20.954	1:20.954
5	(Canada)	Paul Tracy	Forsythe Racing	1:22.400	1:21.009	1:21.009
6	(Canada)	Alex Tagliani	Team Australia	1:23.681	1:21.160	1:21.160
7	(Mexico)	Mario Domínguez	Forsythe Racing	1:22.407	1:21.600	1:21.600
8	(Brazil)	Cristiano da Matta	PKV Racing	1:22.492	1:21.623	1:21.623
9	(United States)	Jimmy Vasser	PKV Racing	1:22.559	1:21.794	1:21.794
10	(France)	Nelson Philippe	Mi-Jack Conquest Racing	1:23.268	1:21.893	1:21.893
11	(Germany)	Timo Glock	Rocketsports Racing	1:23.434	1:22.066	1:22.066
12	(Mexico)	Rodolfo Lavín	HVM Racing	1:25.049	1:22.262	1:22.262
13	(United States)	Ryan Hunter-Reay	Rocketsports Racing	—	1:22.285	1:22.285
14	(Canada)	Andrew Ranger	Mi-Jack Conquest Racing	1:25.680	1:22.315	1:22.315
15	(Sweden)	Björn Wirdheim	HVM Racing	1:23.720	1:22.651	1:22.651
16	(Brazil)	Ricardo Sperafico	Dale Coyne Racing	—	1:22.917	1:22.917
17	(Denmark)	Ronnie Bremer	Dale Coyne Racing	1:24.515	1:23.214	1:23.214
18	(Australia)	Marcus Marshall	Team Australia	1:24.723	1:23.266	1:23.266

== Race ==
Pos	No	Driver	Team	Laps	Time/Retired	Grid	Points
1	2	(Spain) Oriol Servià	Newman/Haas Racing	79	1:59:10.516	2	32
2	8	(Germany) Timo Glock	Rocketsports Racing	79	+1.000 secs	11	29
3	9	(United Kingdom) Justin Wilson	RuSPORT	79	+1.416 secs	3	25
4	1	(France) Sébastien Bourdais	Newman/Haas Racing	79	+1.637 secs	1	27
5	15	(Canada) Alex Tagliani	Team Australia	79	+3.221 secs	6	21
6	21	(Brazil) Cristiano da Matta	PKV Racing	79	+4.452 secs	8	19
7	12	(United States) Jimmy Vasser	PKV Racing	79	+5.311 secs	9	17
8	3	(Canada) Paul Tracy	Forsythe Racing	79	+6.672 secs	5	15
9	10	(United States) A. J. Allmendinger	RuSPORT	79	+7.213 secs	4	13
10	7	(Mexico) Mario Domínguez	Forsythe Racing	79	+7.678 secs	7	11
11	27	(Canada) Andrew Ranger	Mi-Jack Conquest Racing	79	+12.614 secs	14	10
12	31	(United States) Ryan Hunter-Reay	Rocketsports Racing	79	+14.154 secs	13	9
13	4	(Sweden) Björn Wirdheim	HVM Racing	79	+16.104 secs	15	8
14	55	(Mexico) Rodolfo Lavín	HVM Racing	79	+16.975 secs	12	7
15	34	(France) Nelson Philippe	Mi-Jack Conquest Racing	79	+45.359 secs	10	6
16	5	(Australia) Marcus Marshall	Team Australia	78	+ 1 Lap	18	5
17	19	(Denmark) Ronnie Bremer	Dale Coyne Racing	78	+ 1 Lap	17	4
18	11	(Brazil) Ricardo Sperafico	Dale Coyne Racing	55	Contact	16	3

== Caution flags ==
Laps	Cause
58-63	Sperafico (11) contact
66-67	Debris

== Notes ==
Laps	Leader
1-59	Sébastien Bourdais
60-78	Timo Glock
79	Oriol Servià

Driver	Laps led
Sébastien Bourdais	59
Timo Glock	19
Oriol Servià	1

- New Race Record Oriol Servià 1:59:10.516
- Average Speed 107.746 mph

== Championship standings after the race ==
Drivers' Championship standings

	Pos	Driver	Points
	1	(France) Sébastien Bourdais	276
1	2	(Spain) Oriol Servià	215
1	3	(Canada) Paul Tracy	211
	4	(United Kingdom) Justin Wilson	204
1	5	(United States) A. J. Allmendinger	164

- Note: Only the top five positions are included.

Previous race: 2005 Centrix Financial Grand Prix of Denver	Champ Car World Series; 2005 season	Next race: 2005 Hurricane Relief 400
Previous race: 2004 Molson Indy Montreal	2005 Molson Indy Montreal	Next race: 2006 Champ Car Grand Prix de Montreal
