= 2005 Tecate/Telmex Grand Prix of Monterrey =

Motor race

Coordinates: 25°40′41″N 100°17′00″W

(Mexico) 2005 Monterrey
Race details
- Race 2 of 13 in the 2005 Champ Car season
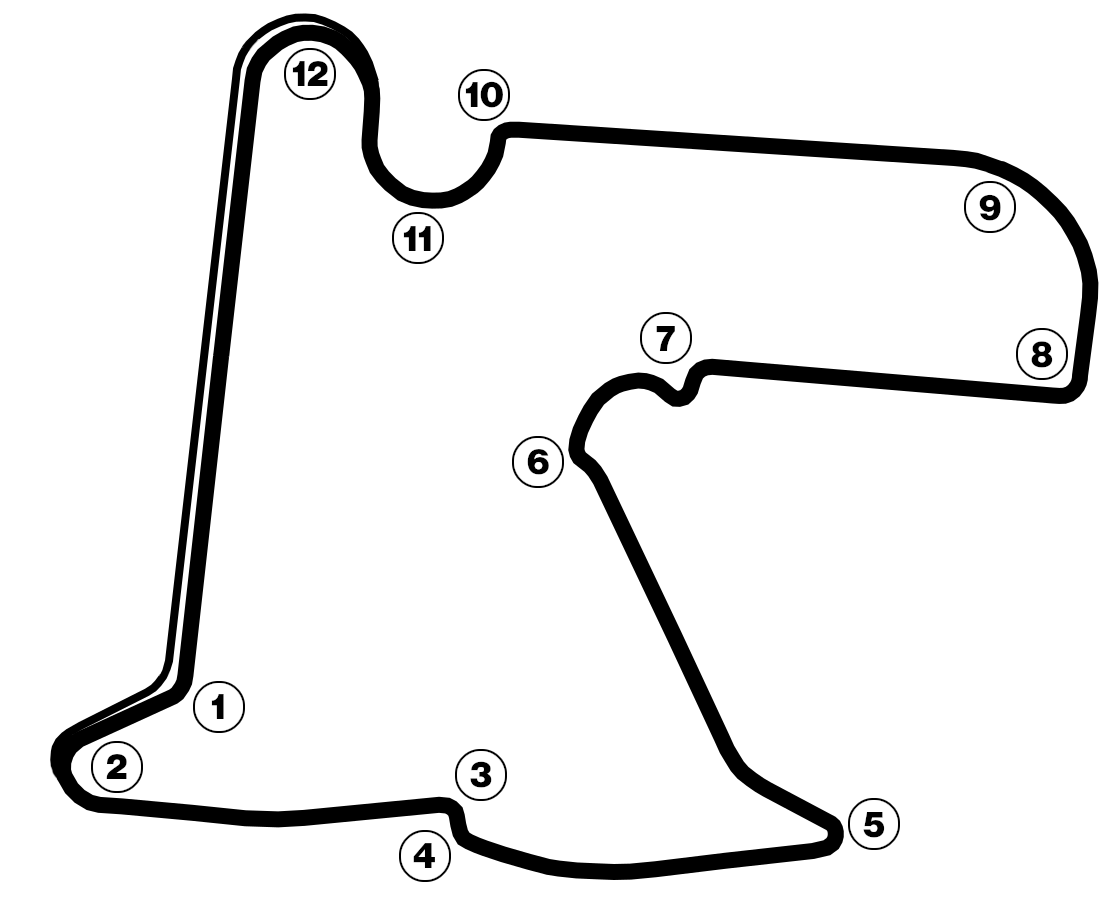
- Fundidora Park track layout
- Date: May 22, 2005
- Official name: Tecate Telmex Monterrey Grand Prix Presented by Roshfrans
- Location: Fundidora Park; Monterrey, Nuevo León, Mexico
- Course: Temporary street circuit 2.104 mi / 3.386 km
- Distance: 76 laps 159.904 mi / 257.336 km
- Weather: Hot and Hazy

Pole position
- Driver: (France) Sébastien Bourdais (Newman/Haas Racing)
- Time: 1:13.627

Fastest lap
- Driver: (Germany) Timo Glock (Rocketsports Racing)
- Time: 1:15.307 (on lap 31 of 76)

Podium
- First: (Brazil) Bruno Junqueira (Newman/Haas Racing)
- Second: (Canada) Andrew Ranger (Mi-Jack Conquest Racing)
- Third: (Canada) Alex Tagliani (Team Australia)

The 2005 Tecate/Telmex Monterrey Grand Prix was the second round of the 2005 Bridgestone Presents the Champ Car World Series Powered by Ford season, held on May 22, 2005 on the streets of Fundidora Park in Monterrey, Mexico. Sébastien Bourdais was the polesitter and the race winner was Bruno Junqueira. The race was Junqueria's eighth and last victory in an American open wheel racing event. Junqueria was seriously injured in a crash at the 2005 Indianapolis 500 the following weekend and missed the rest of the Champ Car season.

== Qualifying results ==
Pos	Nat	Name	Team	Qual 1	Qual 2	Best
1	(France)	Sébastien Bourdais	Newman/Haas Racing	1:14.967	1:13.627	1:13.627
2	(United Kingdom)	Justin Wilson	RuSPORT	1:15.836	1:14.204	1:14.204
3	(Canada)	Paul Tracy	Forsythe Racing	1:22.302	1:14.321	1:14.321
4	(Canada)	Alex Tagliani	Team Australia	1:16.217	1:14.342	1:14.342
5	(Brazil)	Bruno Junqueira	Newman/Haas Racing	1:15.248	1:14.649	1:14.649
6	(Mexico)	Mario Domínguez	Forsythe Racing	1:16.306	1:14.817	1:14.817
7	(Spain)	Oriol Servià	Dale Coyne Racing	1:17.481	1:14.922	1:14.922
8	(United States)	Jimmy Vasser	PKV Racing	1:16.519	1:15.032	1:15.032
9	(Brazil)	Cristiano da Matta	PKV Racing	1:16.537	1:15.118	1:15.118
10	(Denmark)	Ronnie Bremer	HVM Racing	1:16.853	1:15.258	1:15.258
11	(United States)	A. J. Allmendinger	RuSPORT	1:16.345	1:15.261	1:15.261
12	(Germany)	Timo Glock	Rocketsports Racing	1:16.454	1:15.288	1:15.288
13	(France)	Nelson Philippe	Mi-Jack Conquest Racing	1:18.067	1:15.487	1:15.487
14	(Canada)	Andrew Ranger	Mi-Jack Conquest Racing	1:16.332	1:15.610	1:15.610
15	(Sweden)	Björn Wirdheim	HVM Racing	1:17.671	1:15.692	1:15.692
16	(Brazil)	Ricardo Sperafico	Dale Coyne Racing	1:17.794	1:16.140	1:16.140
17	(United States)	Ryan Hunter-Reay	Rocketsports Racing	1:17.864	1:16.252	1:16.252
18	(Mexico)	Jorge Goeters	PKV Racing	1:19.225	1:16.412	1:16.412
19	(Australia)	Marcus Marshall	Team Australia	1:18.421	1:17.842	1:17.842

== Race ==
Pos	No	Driver	Team	Laps	Time/Retired	Grid	Points
1	2	(Brazil) Bruno Junqueira	Newman/Haas Racing	76	2:03:38.021	5	32
2	27	(Canada) Andrew Ranger	Mi-Jack Conquest Racing	76	+1.376 secs	14	28
3	15	(Canada) Alex Tagliani	Team Australia	76	+2.847 secs	4	25
4	9	(United Kingdom) Justin Wilson	RuSPORT	76	+8.234 secs	2	23
5	1	(France) Sébastien Bourdais	Newman/Haas Racing	76	+9.162 secs	1	24
6	21	(Brazil) Cristiano da Matta	PKV Racing	76	+9.818 secs	9	19
7	31	(United States) Ryan Hunter-Reay	Rocketsports Racing	76	+11.558 secs	17	17
8	4	(Sweden) Björn Wirdheim	HVM Racing	76	+19.074 secs	15	16
9	19	(Spain) Oriol Servià	Dale Coyne Racing	76	+20.967 secs	7	13
10	10	(United States) A. J. Allmendinger	RuSPORT	75	+ 1 Lap	11	11
11	8	(Germany) Timo Glock	Rocketsports Racing	69	Contact	12	11
12	34	(France) Nelson Philippe	Mi-Jack Conquest Racing	68	Contact	13	10
13	7	(Mexico) Mario Domínguez	Forsythe Racing	56	Contact	6	8
14	12	(United States) Jimmy Vasser	PKV Racing	54	Contact	8	7
15	3	(Canada) Paul Tracy	Forsythe Racing	49	Contact	3	7
16	5	(Australia) Marcus Marshall	Team Australia	39	Contact	19	5
17	11	(Brazil) Ricardo Sperafico	Dale Coyne Racing	28	Lost wheel	16	4
18	52	(Mexico) Jorge Goeters	PKV Racing	23	Gearbox	18	3
19	55	(Denmark) Ronnie Bremer	HVM Racing	13	Drive shaft	10	2

== Caution flags ==
Laps	Cause
9-12	Glock (8) spin/stall
16-18	Bremer (55) stopped on course
21-23	Sperafico (11) spin/stall
33-36	Sperafico (11) contact
38-40	Vasser (12) spin/stall
45-48	Glock (8) & Vasser (12) contact
57-60	Domínguez (7) & Vasser (12) contact
64-66	Allmendinger (10) spin/stall
69-72	Glock (8) & Philippe (34) contact

== Notes ==
Laps	Leader
1-17	Sébastien Bourdais
18-28	Nelson Philippe
29-36	Björn Wirdheim
37-45	Paul Tracy
46-57	Nelson Philippe
58-67	Björn Wirdheim
68-76	Bruno Junqueira

Driver	Laps led
Nelson Philippe	23
Björn Wirdheim	18
Sébastien Bourdais	17
Bruno Junqueira	9
Paul Tracy	9

- New Track Record Sébastien Bourdais 1:13.627 (Qualification Session #2)
- New Race Record Bruno Junqueira 2:03:38.021
- Average Speed 77.602 mph

== Championship standings after the race ==
Drivers' Championship standings

	Pos	Driver	Points
2	1	(Brazil) Bruno Junqueira	59
1	2	(France) Sébastien Bourdais	58
1	3	(United Kingdom) Justin Wilson	47
2	4	(Canada) Paul Tracy	36
12	5	(Canada) Andrew Ranger	32

- Note: Only the top five positions are included.

Previous race: 2005 Toyota Grand Prix of Long Beach	Champ Car World Series; 2005 season	Next race: 2005 Time Warner Cable Road Runner 225
Previous race: 2004 Tecate/Telmex Grand Prix of Monterrey	2005 Tecate Telmex Monterrey Grand Prix	Next race: 2006 Tecate Grand Prix of Monterrey
