= 2005 Hurricane Relief 400 =

Auto race held in 2005 at Las Vegas

(United States) 2005 Las Vegas
Race details
- Race 11 of 13 in the 2005 Champ Car season
- Date: September 24, 2005
- Official name: Champ Car Hurricane Relief 400
- Location: Las Vegas Motor Speedway; Las Vegas, Nevada, United States
- Course: 1.5 Mile Banked Oval; 1.500 mi / 2.414 km
- Distance: 166 laps 249.000 mi / 400.724 km
- Weather: Mostly Cloudy (night race)

Pole position
- Driver: (France) Sébastien Bourdais (Newman/Haas Racing)
- Time: 26.381

Fastest lap
- Driver: (France) Sébastien Bourdais (Newman/Haas Racing)
- Time: 26.336 (on lap 166 of 166)

Podium
- First: (France) Sébastien Bourdais (Newman/Haas Racing)
- Second: (Spain) Oriol Servià (Newman/Haas Racing)
- Third: (United States) Jimmy Vasser (PKV Racing)

The 2005 Hurricane Relief 400 was the eleventh round of the 2005 Bridgestone Presents the Champ Car World Series Powered by Ford season, held on September 24, 2005, at the Las Vegas Motor Speedway in Las Vegas, Nevada. Sébastien Bourdais swept the pole and the race victory. With the dissolution of the Champ Car World Series in 2008, this was the final Champ Car race to take place on a high-banked oval of more than a mile in length. Proceeds for the event were donated to Hurricane Katrina and Hurricane Rita relief efforts.

== Qualifying results ==
Pos	Nat	Name	Team	Best Lap	Time
1	(France)	Sébastien Bourdais	Newman/Haas Racing	1	26.381
2	(Spain)	Oriol Servià	Newman/Haas Racing	2	26.388
3	(United States)	Jimmy Vasser	PKV Racing	1	26.477
4	(Brazil)	Cristiano da Matta	PKV Racing	1	26.632
5	(Sweden)	Björn Wirdheim	HVM Racing	2	26.635
6	(Mexico)	Mario Domínguez	Forsythe Racing	2	26.638
7	(Mexico)	Rodolfo Lavín	HVM Racing	1	26.732
8	(United States)	A. J. Allmendinger	RuSPORT	1	26.800
9	(United Kingdom)	Justin Wilson	RuSPORT	1	26.860
10	(Australia)	Marcus Marshall	Team Australia	1	26.974
11	(France)	Nelson Philippe	Mi-Jack Conquest Racing	2	26.985
12	(Denmark)	Ronnie Bremer	Dale Coyne Racing	1	26.995
13	(Canada)	Alex Tagliani	Team Australia	1	27.026
14	(Canada)	Paul Tracy	Forsythe Racing	1	27.037
15	(Germany)	Timo Glock	Rocketsports Racing	2	27.110
16	(United States)	Ryan Hunter-Reay	Rocketsports Racing	2	27.175
17	(Canada)	Andrew Ranger	Mi-Jack Conquest Racing	1	27.250
18	(Brazil)	Ricardo Sperafico	Dale Coyne Racing	1	27.423

== Race ==
Pos	No	Driver	Team	Laps	Time/Retired	Grid	Points
1	1	(France) Sébastien Bourdais	Newman/Haas Racing	166	1:26:22.636	1	34
2	2	(Spain) Oriol Servià	Newman/Haas Racing	166	+0.312 secs	2	28
3	12	(United States) Jimmy Vasser	PKV Racing	166	+3.604 secs	3	25
4	7	(Mexico) Mario Domínguez	Forsythe Racing	166	+7.169 secs	6	23
5	55	(Mexico) Rodolfo Lavín	HVM Racing	166	+7.538 secs	7	21
6	4	(Sweden) Björn Wirdheim	HVM Racing	166	+7.555 secs	5	19
7	15	(Canada) Alex Tagliani	Team Australia	166	+8.162 secs	13	17
8	8	(Germany) Timo Glock	Rocketsports Racing	165	+ 1 Lap	15	16
9	5	(Australia) Marcus Marshall	Team Australia	165	+ 1 Lap	10	13
10	31	(United States) Ryan Hunter-Reay	Rocketsports Racing	165	+ 1 Lap	16	11
11	9	(United Kingdom) Justin Wilson	RuSPORT	164	+ 2 Laps	9	10
12	21	(Brazil) Cristiano da Matta	PKV Racing	164	+ 2 Laps	4	9
13	10	(United States) A. J. Allmendinger	RuSPORT	163	+ 3 Laps	8	8
14	27	(Canada) Andrew Ranger	Mi-Jack Conquest Racing	162	+ 4 Laps	17	7
15	11	(Brazil) Ricardo Sperafico	Dale Coyne Racing	161	+ 5 Laps	18	6
16	34	(France) Nelson Philippe	Mi-Jack Conquest Racing	127	Contact	11	5
17	3	(Canada) Paul Tracy	Forsythe Racing	123	Contact	14	5
18	19	(Denmark) Ronnie Bremer	Dale Coyne Racing	41	Pit Incident	12	3

== Caution flags ==
Laps	Cause
124-139	Tracy (3) contact; Yellow Restart

== Notes ==
Laps	Leader
1-6	Sébastien Bourdais
7-39	Paul Tracy
40-42	Oriol Servià
43-48	Paul Tracy
49	Sébastien Bourdais
50-81	Paul Tracy
82-83	Sébastien Bourdais
84-86	Oriol Servià
87-96	Paul Tracy
97	Sébastien Bourdais
98-123	Paul Tracy
124-166	Sébastien Bourdais

Driver	Laps led
Paul Tracy	107
Sébastien Bourdais	53
Oriol Servià	6

- New Race Record Sébastien Bourdais 1:26:22.636
- Average Speed 172.962 mph

== Championship standings after the race ==
Drivers' Championship standings

	Pos	Driver	Points
	1	(France) Sébastien Bourdais	310
	2	(Spain) Oriol Servià	243
	3	(Canada) Paul Tracy	216
	4	(United Kingdom) Justin Wilson	214
1	5	(Mexico) Mario Domínguez	186

- Note: Only the top five positions are included.

Previous race: 2005 Molson Indy Montreal	Champ Car World Series; 2005 season	Next race: 2005 Lexmark Indy 300
Previous race: 2004 Bridgestone 400	2005 Hurricane Relief 400	Next race: 2007 Vegas Grand Prix; Street Circuit
