= 2005 Molson Indy Toronto =

Coordinates: 43°38′14″N 79°24′56″W

(Canada) 2005 Toronto
Race details
- Race 6 of 13 in the 2005 Champ Car season
- Exhibition Place track layout
- Date: July 10, 2005
- Official name: Molson Indy Toronto
- Location: Exhibition Place; Toronto, Ontario, Canada
- Course: Temporary Street Course; 1.755 mi / 2.824 km
- Distance: 86 laps 150.930 mi / 242.864 km
- Weather: Sunny with temperatures reaching up to 32 °C (90 °F); with temperatures dropping slightly to 25.7 °C (78.3 °F) by the end of the event

Pole position
- Driver: (France) Sébastien Bourdais (Newman/Haas Racing)
- Time: 58.552

Fastest lap
- Driver: (United Kingdom) Justin Wilson (RuSPORT)
- Time: 59.940 (on lap 79 of 86)

Podium
- First: (United Kingdom) Justin Wilson (RuSPORT)
- Second: (Spain) Oriol Servià (Newman/Haas Racing)
- Third: (Canada) Alex Tagliani (Team Australia)

The 2005 Molson Indy Toronto was the sixth round of the 2005 Bridgestone Presents the Champ Car World Series Powered by Ford season, held on July 10, 2005 on the streets of Exhibition Place in Toronto, Ontario, Canada. Sébastien Bourdais was the pole sitter and Justin Wilson won the race. It was the first American open wheel victory for the British driver. Sébastien Bourdais took the season points lead by finishing fifth and would end up keeping the points lead for the remainder of the season.

== Qualifying results ==
| Pos | Nat | Name | Team | Qual 1 | Qual 2 | Best |
|---|---|---|---|---|---|---|
| 1 | (France) | Sébastien Bourdais | Newman/Haas Racing | 59.010 | 58.552 | 58.552 |
| 2 | (Canada) | Paul Tracy | Forsythe Racing | 58.887 | 58.594 | 58.594 |
| 3 | (United Kingdom) | Justin Wilson | RuSPORT | 59.519 | 58.554 | 58.554 |
| 4 | (Spain) | Oriol Servià | Newman/Haas Racing | 1:00.013 | 58.795 | 58.795 |
| 5 | (Canada) | Alex Tagliani | Team Australia | 59.248 | 58.821 | 58.821 |
| 6 | (Mexico) | Mario Domínguez | Forsythe Racing | 59.380 | 59.089 | 59.089 |
| 7 | (United States) | Jimmy Vasser | PKV Racing | 59.507 | 59.256 | 59.256 |
| 8 | (Brazil) | Cristiano da Matta | PKV Racing | 59.372 | 59.451 | 59.372 |
| 9 | (United States) | A. J. Allmendinger | RuSPORT | 59.578 | 59.416 | 59.416 |
| 10 | (France) | Nelson Philippe | Mi-Jack Conquest Racing | 1:00.477 | 59.448 | 59.448 |
| 11 | (Canada) | Andrew Ranger | Mi-Jack Conquest Racing | 1:00.478 | 59.486 | 59.486 |
| 12 | (Sweden) | Björn Wirdheim | HVM Racing | 1:00.402 | 59.705 | 59.705 |
| 13 | (Brazil) | Ricardo Sperafico | Dale Coyne Racing | 1:00.687 | 59.961 | 59.961 |
| 14 | (Germany) | Timo Glock | Rocketsports Racing | 1:01.992 | 1:00.189 | 1:00.189 |
| 15 | (Brazil) | Alex Sperafico | HVM Racing | 1:00.686 | 1:00.336 | 1:00.336 |
| 16 | (United Kingdom) | Ryan Dalziel | Dale Coyne Racing | 1:00.877 | 1:00.436 | 1:00.436 |
| 17 | (United States) | Ryan Hunter-Reay | Rocketsports Racing | 1:00.783 | 1:00.591 | 1:00.591 |
| 18 | (Australia) | Marcus Marshall | Team Australia | 1:01.015 | 1:00.613 | 1:00.613 |

== Race ==
| Pos | No | Driver | Team | Laps | Time/Retired | Grid | Points |
|---|---|---|---|---|---|---|---|
| 1 | 9 | (United Kingdom) Justin Wilson | RuSPORT | 86 | 1:46:10.177 | 3 | 33 |
| 2 | 2 | (Spain) Oriol Servià | Newman/Haas Racing | 86 | +0.730 secs* | 4 | 28 |
| 3 | 15 | (Canada) Alex Tagliani | Team Australia | 86 | +1.695 secs | 5 | 25 |
| 4 | 12 | (United States) Jimmy Vasser | PKV Racing | 86 | +1.868 secs | 7 | 23 |
| 5 | 1 | (France) Sébastien Bourdais | Newman/Haas Racing | 86 | +2.558 secs | 1 | 23 |
| 6 | 31 | (United States) Ryan Hunter-Reay | Rocketsports Racing | 86 | +3.234 secs | 17 | 20 |
| 7 | 8 | (Germany) Timo Glock | Rocketsports Racing | 86 | +4.698 secs | 14 | 17 |
| 8 | 55 | (Brazil) Alex Sperafico | HVM Racing | 86 | +5.377 secs | 15 | 15 |
| 9 | 19 | (United Kingdom) Ryan Dalziel | Dale Coyne Racing | 85 | + 1 Lap | 16 | 13 |
| 10 | 34 | (France) Nelson Philippe | Mi-Jack Conquest Racing | 85 | + 1 Lap | 10 | 11 |
| 11 | 27 | (Canada) Andrew Ranger | Mi-Jack Conquest Racing | 83 | Shut off | 11 | 10 |
| 12 | 10 | (United States) A. J. Allmendinger | RuSPORT | 80 | Contact | 9 | 9 |
| 13 | 7 | (Mexico) Mario Domínguez | Forsythe Racing | 80 | Contact | 6 | 8 |
| 14 | 5 | (Australia) Marcus Marshall | Team Australia | 65 | Contact | 18 | 7 |
| 15 | 4 | (Sweden) Björn Wirdheim | HVM Racing | 60 | Contact | 12 | 6 |
| 16 | 3 | (Canada) Paul Tracy | Forsythe Racing | 57 | Out of fuel | 2 | 7 |
| 17 | 21 | (Brazil) Cristiano da Matta | PKV Racing | 56 | Contact | 8 | 4 |
| 18 | 11 | (Brazil) Ricardo Sperafico | Dale Coyne Racing | 55 | Contact | 13 | 3 |

* Race finished under caution.

== Caution flags ==
| Laps | Cause |
|---|---|
| 57-61 | da Matta (21) & R. Sperafico (11) contact |
| 62-65 | Wirdheim (4) contact |
| 66-71 | Marshall (5), Philippe (34) & Glock (8) contact |
| 81-86 | Allmendinger (10) & Domínguez (7) contact; Ranger (27) stall |

== Notes ==
| Laps | Leader |
|---|---|
| 1-34 | Sébastien Bourdais |
| 35-56 | Paul Tracy |
| 57-76 | Oriol Servià |
| 77-86 | Justin Wilson |

| Driver | Laps led |
|---|---|
| Sébastien Bourdais | 34 |
| Paul Tracy | 22 |
| Oriol Servià | 20 |
| Justin Wilson | 10 |

- New Race Record Justin Wilson 1:46:10.177
- Average Speed 85.296 mph

== Championship standings after the race ==
Drivers' Championship standings

| | Pos | Driver | Points |
|---|---|---|---|
| 1 | 1 | (France) Sébastien Bourdais | 150 |
| 1 | 2 | (Canada) Paul Tracy | 135 |
| 1 | 3 | (United Kingdom) Justin Wilson | 128 |
| 1 | 4 | (United States) A. J. Allmendinger | 111 |
| 2 | 5 | (Spain) Oriol Servià | 107 |

- Note: Only the top five positions are included.

| Previous race: 2005 Grand Prix of Cleveland | Champ Car World Series; 2005 season | Next race: 2005 West Edmonton Mall Grand Prix of Edmonton |
| Previous race: 2004 Molson Indy Toronto | 2005 Molson Indy Toronto | Next race: 2006 Molson Grand Prix of Toronto |
