= 1990 Michigan 500 =

Coordinates: 42°03′58.68″N 84°14′29.18″W

(United States) 1990 Michigan 500
Race details
- Race 10 of 16 in the 1990 CART season
- Date: August 5, 1990
- Official name: 1990 Marlboro 500
- Location: Michigan International Speedway, Brooklyn, Michigan, United States
- Course: Permanent racing facility 2.000 mi / 3.219 km
- Distance: 250 laps 500.000 mi / 804.672 km
- Weather: Mostly Cloudy with temperatures up to 81 °F (27 °C); wind speeds reaching up to 14 miles per hour (23 km/h)

Pole position
- Driver: (Brazil) Emerson Fittipaldi (Team Penske)
- Time: 222.593 mph (358.229 km/h)

Podium
- First: (United States) Al Unser Jr. (Galles Racing)
- Second: (United States) Bobby Rahal (Galles Racing)
- Third: (United States) Mario Andretti (Newman-Haas Racing)

The 1990 Michigan 500, the tenth running of the event, was held at the Michigan International Speedway in Brooklyn, Michigan, on Sunday, August 5, 1990. Branded as the 1990 Marlboro 500 for sponsorship reasons, the event was race number 10 of 16 in the 1990 CART PPG Indy Car World Series. The race was won by Al Unser Jr., his first 500-mile Indy Car victory. With an average speed of 189.727 mph, it remained the fastest 500 mile Indy car race until the 2002 The 500 at California Speedway.

== Background ==
Between 1981 and 1989, the Michigan 500 was part of IndyCar racing's Triple Crown of 500 mile races. It existed as the "middle jewel" of IndyCar's three "crown jewel" races: the Indianapolis 500, Michigan 500, and Pocono 500. However, following the 1989 season, Pocono Raceway chose to cancel their IndyCar race moving forward, citing decreased interest from fans in Indycar racing. This ultimately ended IndyCar's Triple Crown aspect of their schedule and left Indianapolis and Michigan as the only two 500 mile races.

Like at Pocono, the crowd for the Michigan 500 had shrunk in recent years as well, from the peak in 1986 at 80,000 spectators, to only 55,000 in 1989. By comparison, the August NASCAR race at the track two weeks after the Michigan 500 attracted 80,000 spectators.

Arie Luyendyk won the 1990 Indianapolis 500.

For the third straight year, Marlboro offered the Marlboro Million, offering a one million dollar prize should a driver win the Marlboro Grand Prix at the Meadowlands, the Marlboro 500 at Michigan, and the Marlboro Challenge. Three weeks before the Marlboro 500, Michael Andretti won the Marlboro Grand Prix and entered Michigan still eligible for the Marlboro Million.

== Practice and Time Trials ==
Thursday's opening practice session was marked by high speeds and two crashes. Rick Mears posted the fastest speed at 221.682 mph. Al Unser Jr. was second fastest at 221.511 mph, followed by Emerson Fittipaldi at 221.426 mph.

Driving for Patrick Racing, 51 year-old Al Unser experienced a mechanical failure and crashed straight into the third turn wall with the right side of the car. Unser suffered a broken right femur, right collarbone, and three upper right ribs. The accident occurred after only six practice laps. Later that afternoon, Unser was flown to Methodist Hospital in Indianapolis for surgery. After investigating the car, Unser's crew discovered a broken right-front push rod was the cause of the accident.

Tero Palmroth hit the turn four wall. Unable to repair the car, his team withdrew from the race. Salt Walther crashed in turn two after blowing an engine and Arie Luyendyk crashed after running over debris from Walther's accident. Luyendyk went to a backup car while Walther was forced to withdraw from the race.

On Friday, Emerson Fittipaldi won the pole with a speed of 222.593 mph. Bobby Rahal qualified second at 221.859 mph. Danny Sullivan completed the front row with a speed of 221.764 mph.

In a practice session on Friday afternoon following qualifying, Emerson Fittipaldi experienced a fire while refueling on pit road. Three crewmen suffered burns and were treated at the track infield hospital.

22 cars had qualified for the race on Friday. Saturday's second round of qualifying was cancelled due to rain. Six additional cars were added to the field, with the order set by random draw. Of those, Walther and Palmroth withdrew due to a lack of backup cars.

On Sunday morning, the International Race of Champions competed at Michigan. Dale Earnhardt won the 100 mile event. Al Unser Jr., Bobby Rahal, Emerson Fittipaldi, and Danny Sullivan competed in the IROC race and then in the Michigan 500.

== Race ==
An estimated 55,000 spectators filled the stands to watch the Michigan 500.

At the start of the race, Emerson Fittipaldi drove off to a commanding lead. Arie Luyendyk was the only challenge for Fittipaldi, with Luyendyk leading for 15 laps. On lap 140, Luyendyk blew an engine and brought out the caution.

Fittipaldi led 134 of the first 150 laps. Shortly after the restart for Luyendyk's engine failure, Al Unser Jr. passed Fittipaldi for the lead on lap 151. Four laps later, Fittipaldi's engine blew and brought out another caution.

Fittipaldi's retirement left Unser Jr. and his teammate Bobby Rahal in control of the event. Rahal took the lead on lap 170 and led for the next 42 circuits. Michael Andretti, the only other car remaining on the lead lap, blew an engine on lap 200 and brought out a caution. After a brief restart, Rick Mears blew an engine in turn two.

After the caution for Mears' engine, Rahal and Unser Jr. staged a classic duel. Unser took the lead on the restart and Rahal took it back. Unser retook the lead and Rahal regained the lead a lap later. Rahal extended his lead to nearly two seconds before he made his final pit stop under green flag conditions on lap 235.

Unser remained on track after Rahal made his final pit stop and put Rahal a lap down. On lap 240, Jon Beekhuis blew an engine and brought out the caution. This allowed Unser to pit under caution and maintain his large lead over Rahal. The race restarted with seven laps remaining, with Rahal at the tail end of the lead lap and Unser behind him.

Unser won the Marlboro 500 by 25.459 seconds over Rahal. He earned $172,684. There were eight cautions for 39 laps. With an average speed of 189.727 mph, the race was the fastest 500-mile race in history at the time. The previous fastest 500-mile Indy car race was in that year's Indianapolis 500 when Arie Luyendyk won with an average speed of 185.981 mph.

== Box score ==
Finish	Grid	No	Name	Team	Chassis	Engine	Laps	Time/Status	Led	Points
1	5	5	(United States) Al Unser Jr.	Galles-Kraco Racing	Lola T90/00	Ilmor-Chevrolet	250	2:38:07.291	40	20
2	2	18	(United States) Bobby Rahal	Galles-Kraco Racing	Lola T90/00	Ilmor-Chevrolet	250	+25.459	61	16
3	11	6	(United States) Mario Andretti	Newman/Haas Racing	Lola T90/00	Ilmor-Chevrolet	249	+1 Lap	0	14
4	10	15	(United States) Eddie Cheever	Chip Ganassi Racing	Penske PC-18	Ilmor-Chevrolet	242	+8 Laps	0	12
5	25	20	(Colombia) Roberto Guerrero	Patrick Racing	Lola T90/00	Alfa Romeo	240	+10 Laps	0	10
6	12	14	(United States) A. J. Foyt	A. J. Foyt Enterprises	Lola T90/00	Ilmor-Chevrolet	240	+10 Laps	0	8
7	8	41	(United States) John Andretti	Porsche Motorsports	March 90P	Porsche	234	+16 Laps	0	6
8	16	56	(United States) Jon Beekhuis	Gohr Racing	Lola T89/00	Judd	221	Engine	0	5
9	24	8	(Brazil) Raul Boesel	Truesports	Lola T89/00	Judd	217	+33 Laps	0	4
10	14	11	(Canada) Scott Goodyear	Doug Shierson Racing	Lola T89/00	Judd	216	+34 Laps	0	3
11	19	50	(United States) Mike Groff	Euromotorsport	Lola T89/00	Cosworth	214	+36 Laps	0	2
12	21	12	(United States) Randy Lewis	Arciero Racing	Penske PC-17	Buick	212	+38 Laps	0	1
13	20	71	(United States) Billy Vukovich III	Hemelgarn Racing	Lola T90/00	Buick	210	+40 Laps	0	0
14	4	2	(United States) Rick Mears	Marlboro Team Penske	Penske PC-19	Ilmor-Chevrolet	201	Engine	0	0
15	9	3	(United States) Michael Andretti	Newman/Haas Racing	Lola T90/00	Ilmor-Chevrolet	200	Engine	0	0
16	15	22	(United States) Scott Brayton	Dick Simon Racing	Lola T90/00	Cosworth	166	Electrical	0	0
17	1	1	(Brazil) Emerson Fittipaldi	Marlboro Team Penske	Penske PC-19	Ilmor-Chevrolet	155	Engine	134	2
18	17	29	(United States) Pancho Carter	Leader Card Racers	Lola T90/00	Cosworth	143	Engine	0	0
19	6	30	(Netherlands) Arie Luyendyk	Doug Shierson Racing	Lola T90/00	Ilmor-Chevrolet	140	Engine	15	0
20	13	17	(United States) Kevin Cogan	Stoops Racing	Lola T90/00	Cosworth	130	Wheel bearing	0	0
21	3	7	(United States) Danny Sullivan	Marlboro Team Penske	Penske PC-19	Ilmor-Chevrolet	64	Vibration	0	0
22	23	16	(United States) Tony Bettenhausen Jr.	Bettenhausen Motorsports	Lola T89/00	Buick	63	Gearbox	0	0
23	18	19	(United States) Dean Hall	Dale Coyne Racing	Lola T90/00	Cosworth	62	Wheel bearing	0	0
24	7	4	(Italy) Teo Fabi	Porsche Motorsports	March 90P	Porsche	58	Handling	0	0
25	22	44	(United States) Jeff Wood	US Engineering	Lola T89/00	Cosworth	26	Electrical	0	0
26	26	24	(United States) Buddy Lazier	Arciero Racing	Penske PC-17	Cosworth	3	Gearbox	0	0

=== Failed to qualify ===
- (Finland) Tero Palmroth (#10) – Withdrawn
- (United States) Al Unser (#40) – Withdrawn, driver injury
- (United States) Salt Walther (#77) – Withdrawn

=== Race statistics ===
Lap Leaders
Laps	Leader
1–41	Emerson Fittipaldi
42–50	Arie Luyendyk
51–68	Emerson Fittipaldi
69–70	Arie Luyendyk
71–106	Emerson Fittipaldi
107	Bobby Rahal
108–111	Arie Luyendyk
112–150	Emerson Fittipaldi
151–169	Al Unser Jr.
170–211	Bobby Rahal
212–215	Al Unser Jr.
216–217	Bobby Rahal
218	Al Unser Jr.
219–234	Bobby Rahal
235–250	Al Unser Jr.

Cautions: 8 for 39 laps
Laps	Reason
29–34	Jeff Wood tow-in
81–85	Tony Bettenhausen Jr. tow-in
141–146	Arie Luyendyk engine
155–160	Emerson Fittipaldi engine
180–183	Randy Lewis slow on track
201–204	Michael Andretti engine
208–211	Rick Mears spin turn 2
240–243	Jon Beekhuis engine

== Broadcasting ==
The Michigan 500 was broadcast live on television by ABC. Paul Page was the lead announcer and was joined by Bobby Unser and Sam Posey as color commentators.
