= Newman/Haas Racing =

CART and IndyCar race team

Newman / Haas Racing
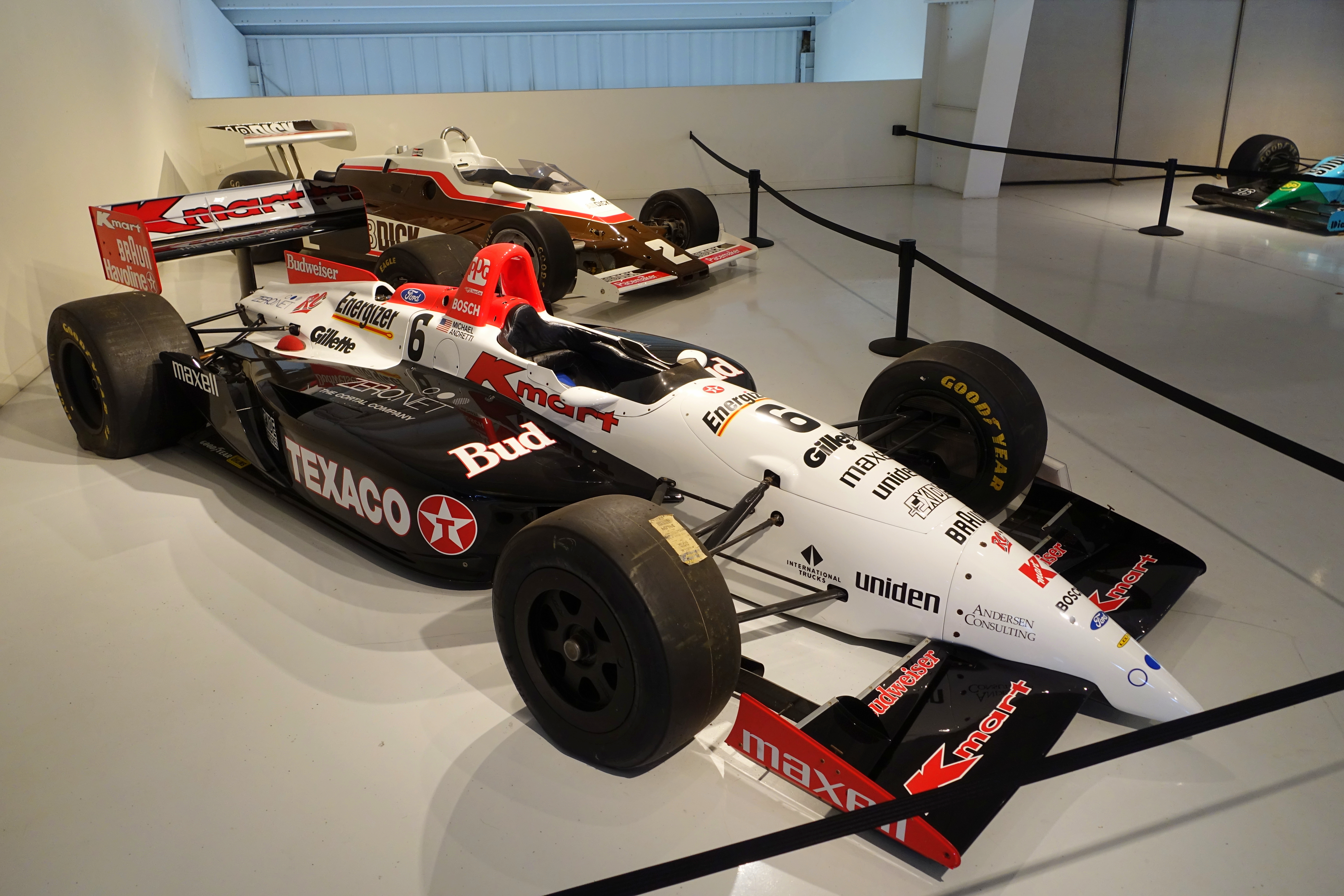
- Owner(s): Paul Newman; Carl Haas; Mike Lanigan
- Base: Lincolnshire, Illinois, United States
- Series: CART, IndyCar

Career
- Debut: 1983 Kraco Dixie 200
- Latest race: 2011 IZOD IndyCar World Championships
- Drivers' Championships: 8
- Race victories: 107
- Pole positions: 109

Newman/Haas Racing was an auto racing team that competed in CART, Champ Car, and the IndyCar Series from 1983 to 2011. The team operations were based in Lincolnshire, Illinois. Newman/Haas Racing was formed as a partnership between actor, automotive enthusiast and semi-professional racer Paul Newman and long-time auto racing owner/driver Carl Haas. The duo were competitors in sports car racing during the 1970s and early 1980s. In 1983, they joined forces to enter the ranks of Indy car racing. Newman/Haas was one of the most successful teams in Indy car racing during the 1980s, 1990s, and 2000s. The team won 105 CART/Champ Car races and eight season championships, followed by two race wins in the IRL/IndyCar Series.

During the 1980s and for the better part of the 1990s, the team was closely aligned with the Andretti family. In 1983, Mario Andretti signed as the primary driver, an arrangement that would carry him through the remainder of his career, until his retirement in 1994. Michael Andretti drove for the team in 1989–1992 and again in 1995–2000. Both Mario and Michael won a CART championship driving for the team. Newman/Haas was also the team for which Nigel Mansell competed in CART, winning the 1993 title.

Despite their many years of success in Indy car racing, and their status as an elite team in the sport, the team never achieved a victory of any sort at the Indianapolis 500. Their best finishes were second places by Mario Andretti (1985) and by Michael Andretti in (1991). Mansell managed a third in his rookie year (1993).

From 2007 to 2010, Mike Lanigan became a partner in the company and the team became known during that time as Newman/Haas/Lanigan Racing. After the 2011 season, Carl Haas announced that the team would not run in the IndyCar Series in 2012 due to the economic climate. Lanigan became a part-owner of Rahal Letterman Lanigan Racing. The team closed its doors and sold off its equipment. Both of the team's original owners have since died; Newman in 2008 and Haas in 2016.

== CART / Champ Car ==
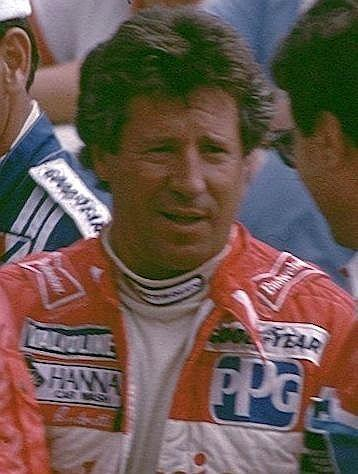
Mario Andretti in 1984

Newman/Haas was one of the most successful teams in the history of CART, its drivers winning eight championships and over 100 individual races. The team's drivers over the years included Mario Andretti, Michael Andretti, Nigel Mansell, Paul Tracy, Cristiano da Matta, Sébastien Bourdais, Justin Wilson, and Graham Rahal.

=== 1983–1988 ===
At its inception, the team was a single-car outfit with championship veteran Mario Andretti, the 1978 Formula One World Champion, hired as lead driver. Team co-owner Carl Haas brought in Lola as chassis manufacturer for the team, re-introducing the constructor to the sport. Haas spearheaded Lola's first full-time, full-scale assault on the Indy car market and the car was quickly picked up by other teams. By the end of the decade, Lola would be one of the dominating chassis manufacturers in the paddock displacing March.

Andretti won two races in 1983 and finished a strong third in points for the first-year team. In 1984, Andretti won six races, nine poles and scored a total of 10 top-ten finishes to win Newman/Haas's first CART season championship.

In 1985, Andretti started off with three wins and a second place in the first four races of the season. He became mired in a mid-season slump and later suffered a broken collarbone, dropping him to fifth in points at the end of the season. While Andretti recovered from injury, 1980 F1 World Champion Alan Jones (who would be the lead driver for the Carl Haas owned Haas Lola Formula One team starting later in 1985) drove one race in substitution finishing 3rd at Road America in what would be his only CART start. Andretti's second place at the 1985 Indianapolis 500 would tie for the team's best result in that event but was widely overshadowed as a highly disappointing defeat. Andretti lost the race to Danny Sullivan.

In 1986, Andretti suffered a crash during practice at Indianapolis, forcing him to start in a back-up car. He dropped out and finished 32nd. Andretti went on to win two races and finished 5th in points. For 1987, the team switched to the Ilmor Chevy Indy V-8 powerplant. Andretti won the season opener at Long Beach, the powerplant's first Indy car victory. Andretti won one other race but suffered more disappointment than success, including another loss at Indy.

=== 1989–1992 ===
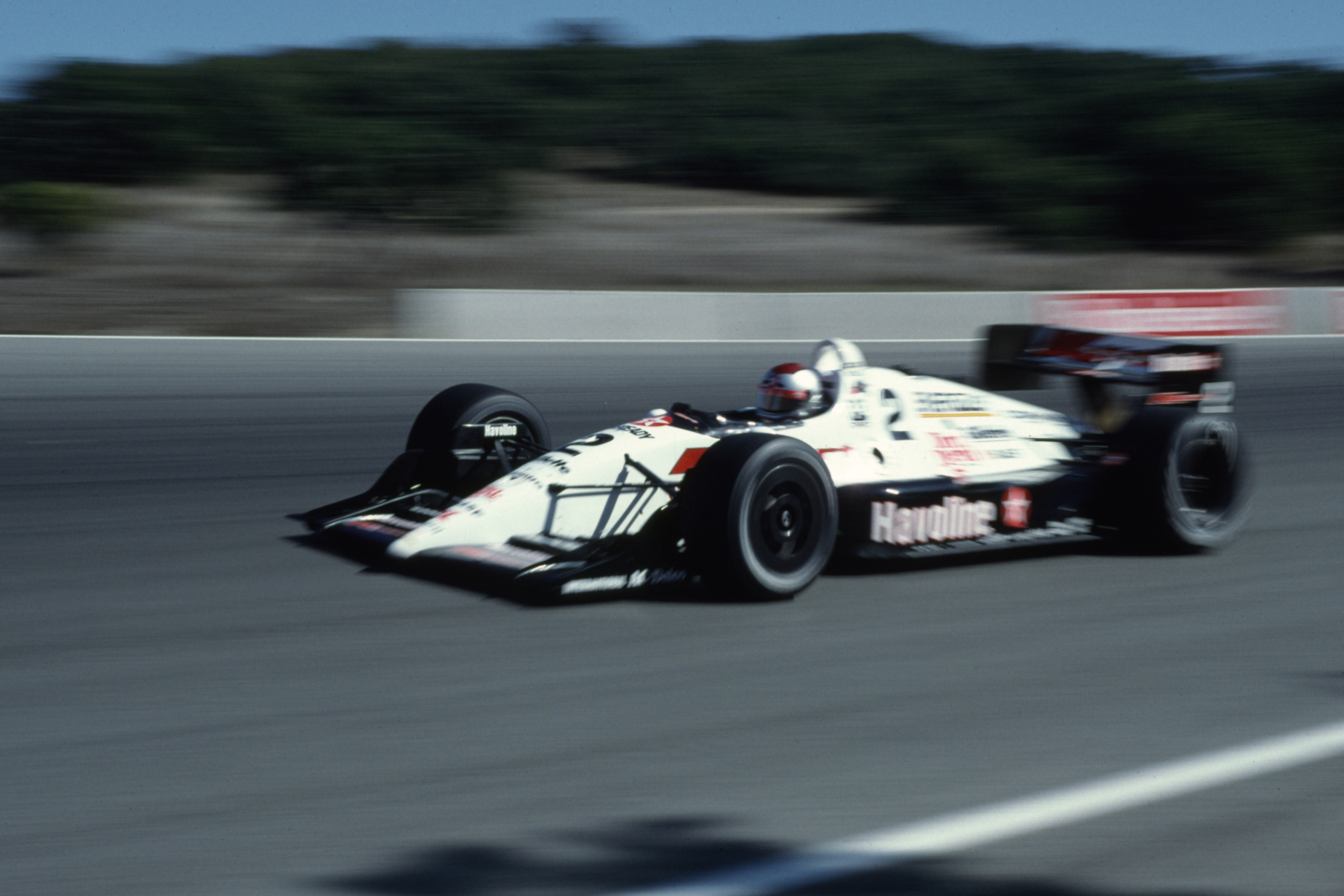
Michael Andretti in 1991

Newman/Haas expanded to a two-car team starting in 1989, adding Michael Andretti. The father and son duo of Mario and Michael Andretti excelled as one of the top teams on the Indy car circuit over the next few years. In their first season as teammates, father and son finished 6th and 3rd in points, respectively. Michael Andretti won the 1991 CART championship and finished second in points in 1990 and 1992.

Starting in 1992, the team switched to the new Ford Cosworth XB engine.

Despite consistent success on the CART circuit, both Mario and Michael still failed to achieve victory for Newman/Haas at the Indy 500. Michael finished second in 1991, and dropped out while leading with 11 laps to go in 1992.

=== 1993–1994 ===
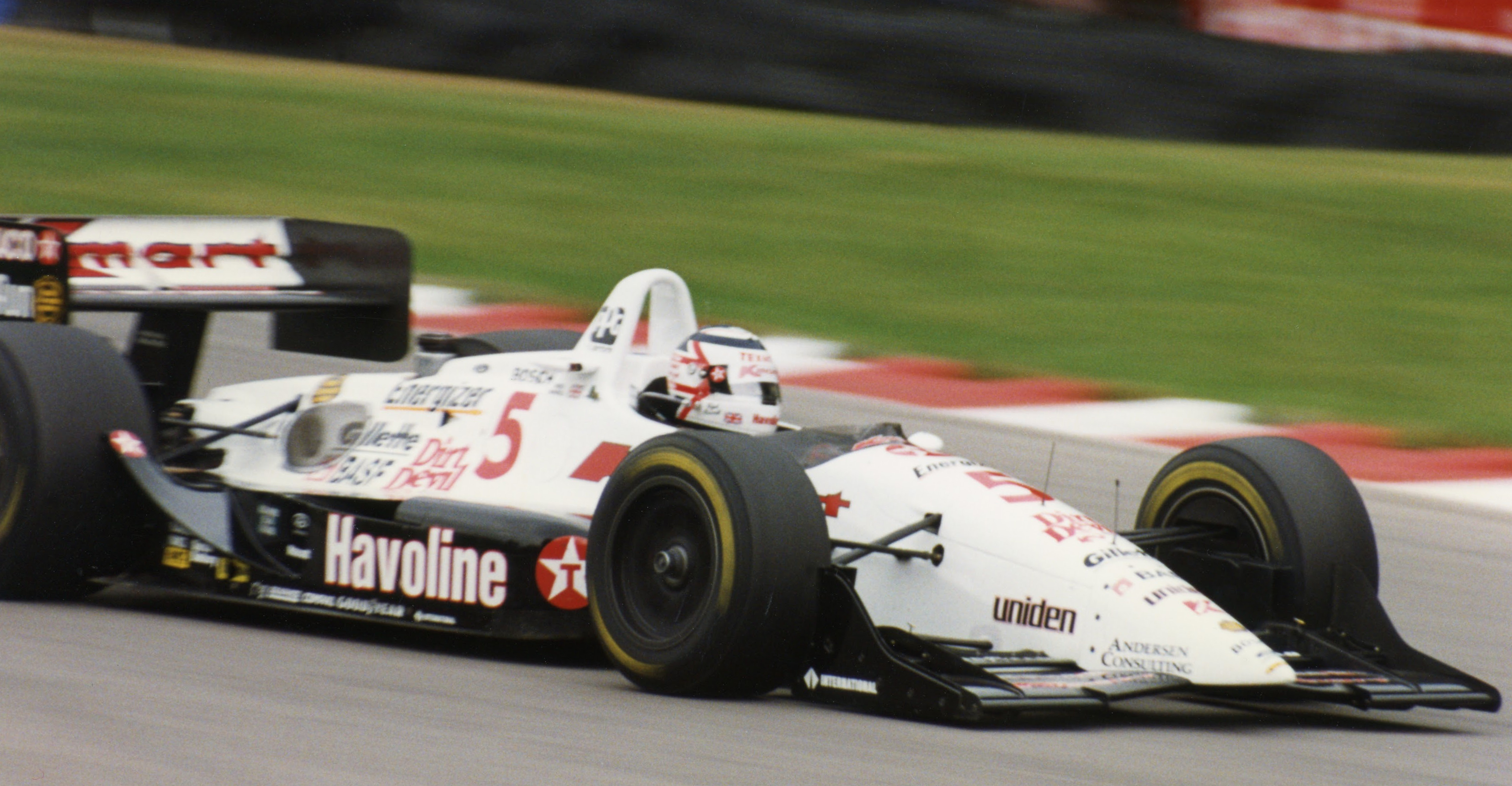
Nigel Mansell driving for the team in 1993.

Michael Andretti left the team to drive for McLaren in Formula One for 1993 and was replaced by English driver Nigel Mansell who arrived on the CART circuit with much fanfare. In his rookie season, Mansell, the reigning Formula One World Champion, won five races and had ten top-3 finishes, clinching the 1993 CART title to become the only driver in history to hold both the Formula One and Champ Car titles at the same time. Mario Andretti also returned to victory lane, winning what would be his final Indy car victory at Phoenix. Both Mansell and Andretti were strong contenders at Indianapolis. Andretti led the most laps, but slipped to 5th due to a penalty and handling problems. Mansell, still largely unfamiliar with rolling re-starts after a safety car period (safety cars would not be introduced into F1 until 1993), was passed for the lead on a restart with 16 laps. He later brushed the wall, and finished 3rd behind winner Emerson Fittipaldi and second-placed Arie Luyendyk.

In 1994, the attention focused on Mario Andretti who announced he would retire at the end of the season. He embarked on a year-long "Arrivederci Mario" tour which celebrated his career. The 1994 season, however, was more maligned for the team. Andretti scored no wins and only three top-five finishes. Mansell slumped as well, scoring no wins and with his contract till the end of 1995, eventually left Indy cars at season's end to return to Formula One after Bernie Ecclestone bought Mansell's contract out. Both Andretti and Mansell had miserable results at Indianapolis in 1994. Mario dropped out and finished 32nd in his final Indy 500 after only 23 laps due to a fuel system failure. Mansell was later knocked out of the race in a bizarre crash with Dennis Vitolo.

=== 1995 ===
Michael Andretti returned to the team in 1995. He experienced an unsuccessful season in Formula One (1993) and drove the 1994 season in CART for Ganassi. Paul Tracy took over the second team car for one season. Andretti scored one win and a 4th place finish in points. Tracy scored two wins and finished 6th in points. At the end of the season, the burgeoning open-wheel "split" saw Newman/Haas firmly taking the side of the CART contingent. Tracy departed to go back to Penske

=== 1996–2002 ===
Michael Andretti and Christian Fittipaldi represented the team together for five seasons with Roberto Moreno driving as an occasional substitute. Andretti won ten races during this period, finishing second in points in 1996 and continued to remain a top driver on the circuit. Fittipaldi scored two wins and the best finish of 5th in points in 1996.

In 1997–1999, the team utilized the Swift chassis but it did not prove to be very successful. The team went back to Lola in 2000.

Andretti parted ways with Newman/Haas after the 2000 season, in part due to the team's refusal to enter a car at Indianapolis of the rival Indy Racing League. He instead formed a team with Kim Green as a satellite to his brother Barry's Team Green.

The 2001 season saw another major change for Newman/Haas as they switched engine suppliers from Ford-Cosworth to Toyota. Cristiano da Matta was brought over from PPI Motorsports to take over for Andretti and in his very first race for the team, he recorded a victory at Monterrey. Fittipaldi, meanwhile, struggled and finished fifteenth in the points with no victories. Da Matta recorded two additional wins for a total of three on the year and would finish fifth.

2002 was a highly successful year for Newman/Haas. Fittipaldi managed to finish fifth in series points for new sponsor Eli Lilly (longtime sponsor Kmart had pulled out of all of its racing sponsorships, including Haas' NASCAR team, following its 2002 bankruptcy) but the season belonged to da Matta. After repeating his feat in Mexico in the season opener, he would later score four consecutive wins by taking the events at Laguna Seca, Portland, Chicago, and Toronto to take a commanding lead in the points. His later wins at Road America and Bayfront Park gave him seven for the year and he finished seventy-three points ahead of second-place Bruno Junqueira in the final points standings.

When the 2002 season ended, both drivers departed the team. Fittipaldi became a full-time NASCAR driver following the season while da Matta was offered a lucrative contract to drive one of two cars for Toyota's factory-backed effort in Formula 1.

=== Champ Car World Series (2003-2007) ===
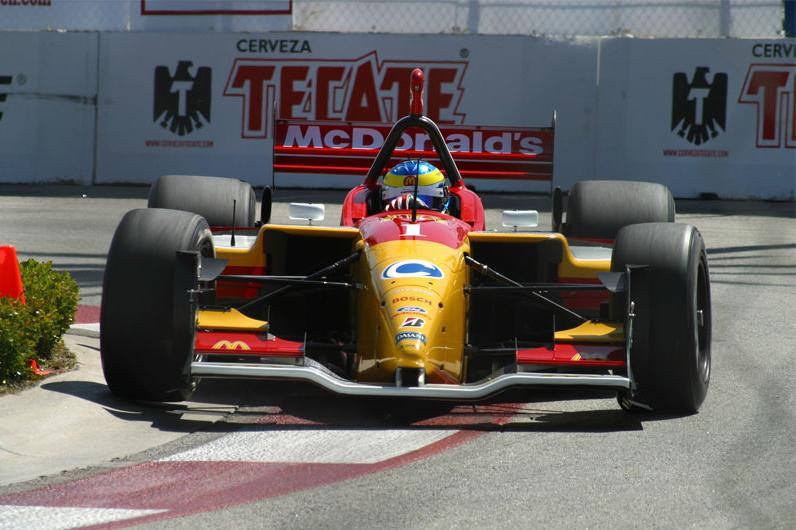
Bourdais won four Champ Car titles with the team.

2003 was a season of upheaval for CART as a whole. Following the lead of Team Penske the year before, several of the top teams in CART defected to the Indy Racing League. Newman/Haas did not and remained loyal to what was now called the Champ Car World Series.

Not only was there a significant amount of team turnover but both Honda and Toyota also departed for the IRL leaving Ford as the only manufacturer. Newman/Haas also needed a new sponsor as ChevronTexaco, the parent company of Havoline, chose not to continue sponsoring the team. They signed PacifiCare as a new sponsor and also brought in McDonald's as initially a secondary sponsor for their second car; the restaurant would eventually take over as primary sponsor the following year.

Needing to round out its driver lineup, Newman/Haas signed Bruno Junqueira and Sébastien Bourdais. Junqueira had driven for Chip Ganassi Racing in 2001 and 2002 but was not retained when the team elected to move over to the IRL, while Bourdais won the 2002 Formula 3000 championship driving for Super Nova Racing. Junqueira won twice at Road America and Denver on route to a second-place finish in the points while series Rookie of the Year Bourdais won at Brands Hatch, Lausitzring and Cleveland while finishing sixth.

2004 saw Bourdais have a breakout season and the team scored a 1-2 finish in the series standings. The Frenchman won seven times in the season, including three consecutive at Portland, Cleveland and Toronto, and won his first championship. Junqueira, meanwhile, scored wins at Montreal and Surfers' Paradise. He also was given a chance to run for Newman/Haas at Indianapolis in the team's return to the 500; Junqueira went on to finish fifth and lead 16 laps in the rain-shortened event.

2005 started out great for Newman/Haas as the team won the first two races. Bourdais took victory at Long Beach while Junqueira won at Monterrey. However, things took a bad turn as the team raced at Indianapolis. Junqueira crashed and suffered a fractured vertebra, forcing him to miss the remainder of the season. He would finish 30th while Bourdais finished 12th.

However, the team once again dominated the series as it had the year before. Bourdais again emerged as the champion, recording five additional victories. He won at Edmonton and San Jose, repeated his victories at Denver and Las Vegas and won at Surfers' Paradise. Oriol Servia ran the remaining events in place of Junqueira and won at Montreal, bringing his team home in second place.

2006 saw more of the same from Bourdais, as he recorded seven more wins. He won all of the first four races, then added victories at San Jose, Montreal and Mexico City on his way to a third consecutive series championship. Junqueira returned from his injury but failed to win a race, finishing fifth overall in the points.

The 2007 season would prove to be the final season for Champ Car and once again, Bourdais emerged as the champion. He recorded a career-high eight victories, including in five of the last seven events and easily took his fourth straight championship. Graham Rahal joined the team replacing Junqueira and finished fifth in the points, with the best finish of second behind his teammate at Houston. The Houston win was Newman/Haas' 100th in the series.

Before the season ended, Scuderia Toro Rosso of Formula 1 announced that Bourdais had signed to drive as teammate to Sebastian Vettel for the team beginning in 2008. Justin Wilson was tabbed to replace him, but he would do so in the IndyCar Series as the two organizations unified during the offseason.

== Indy Racing League / IndyCar Series ==
=== 2004 ===
Though several CART-based teams had returned to the Indianapolis 500 beginning in 2000, Newman/Haas resisted a return to the race until 2004. While maintaining a full-time effort in Champ Car, the team entered singly at Indy with driver Bruno Junqueira. He was leading the race on lap 150, hoping to stretch his fuel and be leading the race when impending rain arrived – which could have given him the race victory. He was forced to pit, and finished 5th when the race was called on lap 180.

=== 2005 ===
In the team's second post-"split" attempt at the Indy 500, both team drivers Bruno Junqueira and Sébastien Bourdais were factors early on but both drivers crashed out. The team would skip the 2006 and 2007 Indy 500 races.

=== 2008 ===
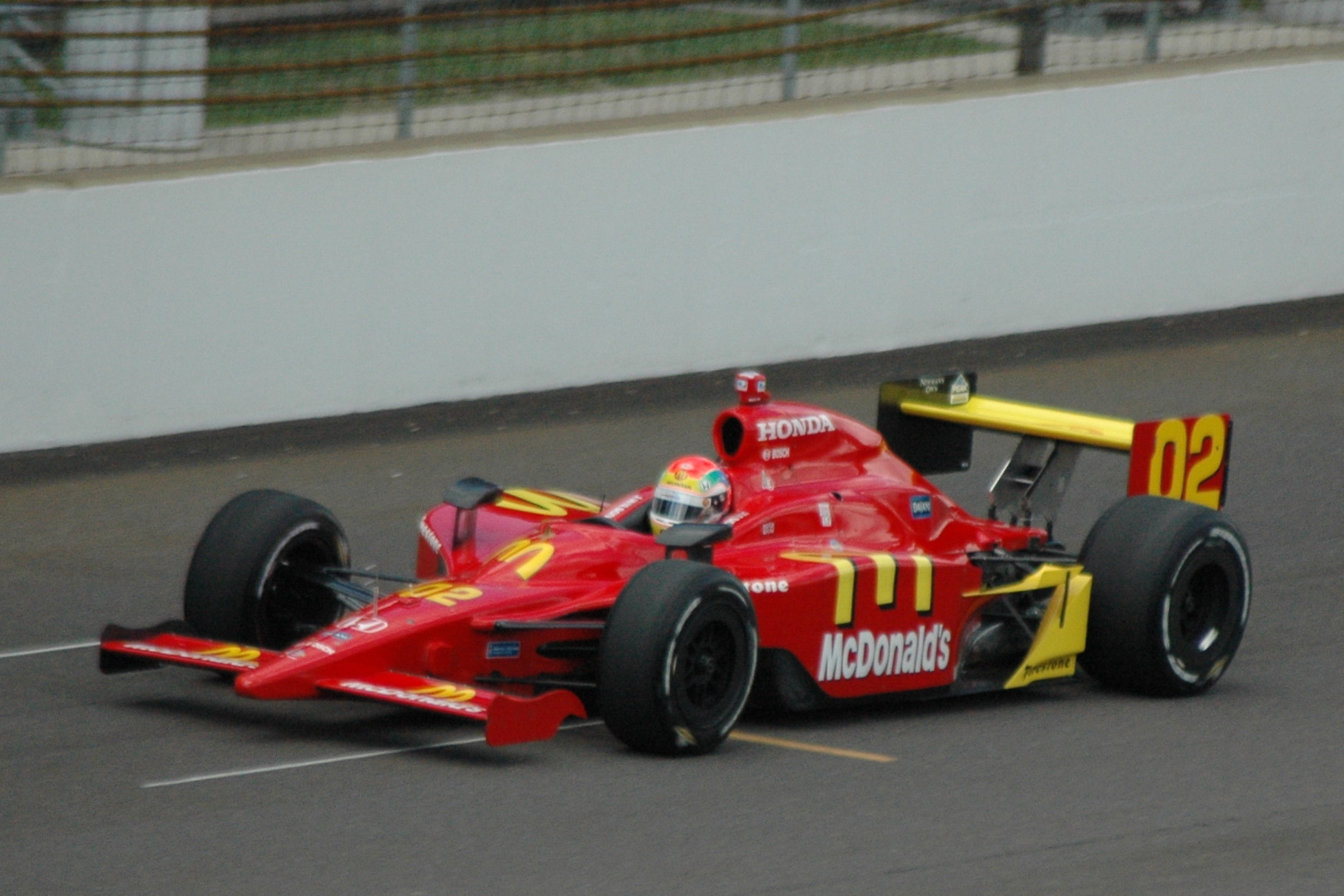
Justin Wilson in 2008

In the wake of the 2008 open-wheel unification, the team transitioned from the Champ Car World Series to the IndyCar Series full-time. The team retained the services of drivers Justin Wilson and Graham Rahal. Like many of the transitional teams, Newman/Haas experienced mixed results getting up to speed compared to some of the established IndyCar counterparts but did achieve two victories during the course of the season.

Justin Wilson led much of the race at St. Petersburg and Graham Rahal ended up winning the race. At the final Champ Car race at Long Beach, both cars dropped out. A month later, both cars crashed out at the Indianapolis 500.

Late in the season, Wilson won the race at Detroit, just weeks before the death of team co-owner Paul Newman. It was the team's 107th and final win in Indy car racing.

=== 2009 ===
Graham Rahal returned but Justin Wilson was replaced by former Champ Car driver Robert Doornbos. Milka Duno tested a third car during the offseason but a ride never materialized. Doornbos left the team in early August and Oriol Servià finished out the season in the car.

=== 2010 ===
Unable to find sponsorship at the beginning of the season, Graham Rahal was released and the team began the season with only one entry for Hideki Mutoh. Rahal rejoined the team later in the season at Toronto, finishing 5th. Rahal found sponsorship for five additional races.

=== 2011 ===
The team began the season with one car, driven by Oriol Servià. Prior to the second race of the season, James Hinchcliffe was added as a second driver for selected events, including Indianapolis.

=== 2012-2013 ===
The team initially planned to run the full 2012 season, going as far as purchasing two Dallara DW12 chassis. However, before the season started, the team announced that they would not compete due to a lack of sponsorship. After briefly entertaining a one-off entry for Jean Alesi at Indianapolis, they withdrew and sold off their cars to Fan Force United. A return in 2013 failed to materialize, and the team formally disbanded.

== Drivers ==
=== CART series ===
- (United States) Mario Andretti (1983–1994)
- (United States) Michael Andretti (1989–1992, 1995–2000)
- (Australia) Alan Jones (1985, substitute for Mario Andretti)
- (Italy) Teo Fabi (1992, substitute for Mario Andretti)
- (United Kingdom) Nigel Mansell (1993–1994)
- (Canada) Paul Tracy (1995)
- (Brazil) Christian Fittipaldi (1996–2002)
- (Brazil) Roberto Moreno (1997–1999, sub for Fittipaldi)
- (Brazil) Cristiano da Matta (2001–2002)

=== Champ Car World Series ===
- (France) Sébastien Bourdais (2003–2007)
- (Brazil) Bruno Junqueira (2003–2006)
- (United States) Graham Rahal (2007)
- (Spain) Oriol Servià (2005, substitute for Junqueira)

=== IndyCar Series ===
- (United Kingdom) Justin Wilson (2008)
- (United Kingdom) Alex Lloyd (2009)
- (Netherlands) Robert Doornbos (2009)
- (Japan) Hideki Mutoh (2010)
- (Canada) James Hinchcliffe (2011)
- (United States) Graham Rahal (2007–2010)
- (Spain) Oriol Servià (2009, replacement for Doornbos; 2011)

=== CART/Champ Car driver championships ===
| Year | Champion | Wins | Chassis | Engine | Tyres |
|---|---|---|---|---|---|
| 1984 | (United States) Mario Andretti | 6 | Lola T800 | Cosworth DFX | Goodyear |
| 1991 | (United States) Michael Andretti | 8 | Lola T91/00 | Chevrolet 265A | Goodyear |
| 1993 | (United Kingdom) Nigel Mansell | 5 | Lola T93/00 | Ford XB V8t | Goodyear |
| 2002 | (Brazil) Cristiano da Matta | 7 | Lola B02/00 | Toyota RV8F | Bridgestone |
| 2004 | (France) Sébastien Bourdais | 7 | Lola B02/00 | Ford XFE | Bridgestone |
| 2005 | (France) Sébastien Bourdais (2) | 6 | Lola B02/00 | Ford XFE | Bridgestone |
| 2006 | (France) Sébastien Bourdais (3) | 7 | Lola B02/00 | Ford XFE | Bridgestone |
| 2007 | (France) Sébastien Bourdais (4) | 8 | Panoz DP01 | Cosworth XFE | Bridgestone |

== Racing results ==
=== Complete CART / Champ Car World Series results ===
(key) (results in bold indicate pole position) (results in italics indicate fastest lap)

| Year | Chassis | Engine | Tyres | Drivers | No. | 1 | 2 | 3 | 4 | 5 | 6 | 7 | 8 | 9 | 10 | 11 | 12 | 13 | 14 | 15 | 16 | 17 | 18 | 19 | 20 | 21 | Pts Pos | Pts |
|---|---|---|---|---|---|---|---|---|---|---|---|---|---|---|---|---|---|---|---|---|---|---|---|---|---|---|---|---|
| 1983 | | | | | | ATL | INDY | MIL | CLE | MCH | ROA | POC | RIV | MDO | MCH | CPL | LAG | PHX | | | | | | | | | | |
| 1983 | Lola T700 | Cosworth DFX V8t | G | (United States) Mario Andretti | 3 | 5 | 23 | 18 | **15** | 3 | **1** | 7 | 16 | 2 | 4 | 1* | 2 | 2 | | | | | | | | | **3rd** | 133 |
| 1984 | | | | | | LBH | PHX | INDY | MIL | POR | MEA | CLE | MCH | ROA | POC | MDO | SAN | MCH | PHX | LAG | CPL | | | | | | | |
| 1984 | Lola T800 | Cosworth DFX V8t | G | (United States) Mario Andretti | 3 | **1*** | 20 | 17 | 8 | **26** | **1*** | **21** | **1** | **1*** | 19 | **1*** | 7 | 1 | 12 | **2** | 2 | | | | | | **1st** | 176 |
| 1985 | | | | | | LBH | INDY | MIL | POR | MEA | CLE | MCH | ROA | POC | MDO | SAN | MCH | LAG | PHX | MIA | | | | | | | | |
| 1985 | Lola T900 | Cosworth DFX V8t | G | (Australia) Alan Jones | 1 | | | | | | | | 3 | | | | | | | | | | | | | | 23rd | 14 |
| 1985 | Lola T900 | Cosworth DFX V8t | G | (United States) Mario Andretti | 1 | **1*** | | **1*** | 1 | **26** | 14* | 10 | | 7 | 7 | 15 | 21 | 11 | 3 | 27 | | | | | | | 5th | 114 |
| 1985 | Lola T900 | Cosworth DFX V8t | G | (United States) Mario Andretti | 3 | | 2* | | | | | | | | | | | | | | | | | | | | 5th | 114 |
| 1986 | | | | | | PHX | LBH | INDY | MIL | POR | MEA | CLE | TOR | MCH | POC | MDO | SAN | MCH | ROA | LAG | PHX | MIA | | | | | | |
| 1986 | Lola T86/00 | Cosworth DFX V8t | G | (United States) Mario Andretti | 2 | | | 32 | | | | | | | | | | | | | | | | | | | 5th | 136 |
| 1986 | Lola T86/00 | Cosworth DFX V8t | G | (United States) Mario Andretti | 5 | **7** | 5 | | 5 | 1 | 24 | 3 | 3 | 21 | 1 | **24** | 8 | 10 | 9 | **4** | 4 | 11 | | | | | 5th | 136 |
| 1987 | | | | | | LBH | PHX | INDY | MIL | POR | MEA | CLE | TOR | MCH | POC | ROA | MDO | NAZ | LAG | MIA | | | | | | | | |
| 1987 | Lola T87/00 | Chevrolet 265A V8t | G | (United States) Mario Andretti | 5 | **1*** | **5** | **9*** | 17 | 10 | **2** | 10 | 15 | 19 | **19** | **1*** | 17 | 19 | **17*** | **4** | | | | | | | 6th | 100 |
| 1988 | | | | | | LBH | PHX | INDY | MIL | POR | MEA | CLE | TOR | MCH | POC | ROA | MDO | NAZ | LAG | MIA | | | | | | | | |
| 1988 | Lola T88/00 | Chevrolet 265A V8t | G | (United States) Mario Andretti | 6 | 1* | 15 | 20 | 17 | 5 | 1 | 25 | 2 | 12 | 17 | 2 | 3 | 3 | 3 | 15 | | | | | | | 5th | 126 |
| 1989 | | | | | | PHX | LBH | INDY | MIL | DET | POR | CLE | MEA | TOR | MCH | POC | MDO | ROA | NAZ | LAG | | | | | | | | |
| 1989 | Lola T89/00 | Chevrolet 265A V8t | G | (United States) Mario Andretti | 5 | 8 | 18 | 4 | 7 | 3 | 25 | 2 | 20 | 26 | 3 | 5 | 7 | 7 | 8 | 2 | | | | | | | 6th | 110 |
| 1989 | Lola T89/00 | Chevrolet 265A V8t | G | (United States) Michael Andretti | 6 | 4 | 2 | 17 | 2 | **13*** | 6 | **18** | 18* | 1 | 1* | 3 | 3 | 6* | 5 | 7 | | | | | | | **3rd** | 150 |
| 1990 | | | | | | PHX | LBH | INDY | MIL | DET | POR | CLE | MEA | TOR | MCH | DEN | VAN | MDO | ROA | NAZ | LAG | | | | | | | |
| 1990 | Lola T90/00 | Chevrolet 265A V8t | G | (United States) Michael Andretti | 3 | 20 | 4 | 20 | 5* | **1*** | 1* | 25 | **1*** | 2 | 15 | 5 | **20** | **1*** | 1 | 5 | 3 | | | | | | **2nd** | 181 |
| 1990 | Lola T90/00 | Chevrolet 265A V8t | G | (United States) Mario Andretti | 6 | 4 | 5 | 27 | 21 | 25 | 2 | 4 | 24 | 6 | 3 | 4 | 3 | 2 | 5 | 4 | 26 | | | | | | 7th | 136 |
| 1991 | | | | | | SFR | LBH | PHX | INDY | MIL | DET | POR | CLE | MEA | TOR | MCH | DEN | VAN | MDO | ROA | NAZ | LAG | | | | | | |
| 1991 | Lola T91/00 | Chevrolet 265A V8t | G | (United States) Michael Andretti | 2 | **14** | **16** | 4 | | 1* | **19** | 1* | 1 | 16 | **1*** | 14* | **3** | **1*** | **1*** | 1* | 3* | **1*** | | | | | **1st** | 234 |
| 1991 | Lola T91/00 | Chevrolet 265A V8t | G | (United States) Michael Andretti | 10 | | | | 2* | | | | | | | | | | | | | | | | | | **1st** | 234 |
| 1991 | Lola T91/00 | Chevrolet 265A V8t | G | (United States) Mario Andretti | 6 | 17 | 19 | 9 | 7 | 3 | 7 | 5 | 6 | 15 | 2 | 4 | 15 | 4 | 7 | 3 | 5 | 3 | | | | | 7th | 132 |
| 1992 | | | | | | SFR | PHX | LBH | INDY | DET | POR | MIL | NHA | TOR | MCH | CLE | ROA | VAN | MDO | NAZ | LAG | | | | | | | |
| 1992 | Lola T91/00; Lola T92/00 | Ford-Cosworth XB V8t | G | (United States) Michael Andretti | 1 | 17* | **10** | **16** | 13* | **4*** | 1* | 1* | 2 | 1* | 18 | 2 | 4 | **1*** | **21*** | **2*** | **1*** | | | | | | **2nd** | 192 |
| 1992 | Lola T91/00; Lola T92/00 | Ford-Cosworth XB V8t | G | (United States) Mario Andretti | 2 | 7 | 17 | 23 | 23 | | 6 | 6 | 7 | 4 | **15** | 5 | 5 | 6 | 5 | 5 | 2 | | | | | | 6th | 105 |
| 1992 | Lola T91/00; Lola T92/00 | Ford-Cosworth XB V8t | G | (Italy) Teo Fabi | 2 | | | | | 6 | | | | | | | | | | | | | | | | | 21st | 8 |
| 1993 | | | | | | SFR | PHX | LBH | INDY | MIL | DET | POR | CLE | TOR | MCH | NHA | ROA | VAN | MDO | NAZ | LAG | | | | | | | |
| 1993 | Lola T93/00 | Ford-Cosworth XB V8t | G | (United Kingdom) Nigel Mansell | 5 | **1** | Wth | **3** | 3 | 1 | **15** | **2** | 3 | 20 | 1* | **1** | 2 | 6 | **12** | **1*** | 23 | | | | | | **1st** | 191 |
| 1993 | Lola T93/00 | Ford-Cosworth XB V8t | G | (United States) Mario Andretti | 6 | 4 | 1 | 18 | 5* | 18 | 3 | 6 | 5 | 8 | **2** | 20 | 15 | 5 | 7 | 13 | 9 | | | | | | 6th | 117 |
| 1994 | | | | | | SFR | PHX | LBH | INDY | MIL | DET | POR | CLE | TOR | MCH | MDO | NHA | VAN | ROA | NAZ | LAG | | | | | | | |
| 1994 | Lola T94/00 | Ford-Cosworth XB V8t | G | (United Kingdom) Nigel Mansell | 1 | **9** | 3 | 2 | 22 | 5 | **21** | 5 | 2 | 23 | **26** | 7 | 18 | 10* | 13 | 22 | 8 | | | | | | 8th | 88 |
| 1994 | Lola T94/00 | Ford-Cosworth XB V8t | G | (United States) Mario Andretti | 6 | 3 | 21 | 5 | 32 | 14 | 18 | 9 | 27 | 4 | 18 | 10 | 19 | 11 | 16 | 25 | 19 | | | | | | 14th | 45 |
| 1995 | | | | | | MIA | SFR | PHX | LBH | NAZ | INDY | MIL | DET | POR | ROA | TOR | CLE | MCH | MDO | NHA | VAN | LAG | | | | | | |
| 1995 | Lola T95/00 | Ford-Cosworth XB V8t | G | (Canada) Paul Tracy | 3 | 27 | 1 | 4 | 28 | 26 | 24 | 1 | 8 | 18 | 2 | 8 | 26 | 23 | 2 | 23 | 8 | 2 | | | | | 6th | 115 |
| 1995 | Lola T95/00 | Ford-Cosworth XB V8t | G | (United States) Michael Andretti | 6 | **20*** | **9*** | 2 | **9** | 22 | 25 | 3 | 4 | 4 | 27 | 1* | 7 | 25 | 19* | 2 | 21 | 4 | | | | | 4th | 123 |
| 1996 | | | | | | MIA | RIO | SFR | LBH | NAZ | 500 | MIL | DET | POR | CLE | TOR | MCH | MDO | ROA | VAN | LAG | | | | | | | |
| 1996 | Lola T96/00 | Ford-Cosworth XB V8t | G | (United States) Michael Andretti | 6 | 9 | 22 | 19 | 7 | 1* | 23 | 1 | 1 | 11 | 19 | 22 | 22 | 3 | 1 | 1* | 9 | | | | | | **2nd** | 132 |
| 1996 | Lola T96/00 | Ford-Cosworth XB V8t | G | (Brazil) Christian Fittipaldi | 11 | 6 | 5 | 5 | 21 | 9 | 12 | 6 | 2* | 3 | 7 | 7 | 10 | 7 | 16 | 3 | 10 | | | | | | 5th | 110 |
| 1997 | | | | | | MIA | SFR | LBH | NAZ | RIO | GAT | MIL | DET | POR | CLE | TOR | MCH | MDO | ROA | VAN | LAG | FON | | | | | | |
| 1997 | Swift 007.i | Ford XD V8t | G | (United States) Michael Andretti | 6 | 1* | 3 | 22 | 2 | 21 | 11* | 2 | 2 | 8 | 23 | 4 | 21 | 8 | 26 | 16 | 27 | 19 | | | | | 8th | 108 |
| 1997 | Swift 007.i | Ford XD V8t | G | (Brazil) Christian Fittipaldi | 11 | 26 | 28 | | | | | | | 4 | 6 | 11 | 16 | 21 | 4 | 9 | 21 | 9 | | | | | 15th | 42 |
| 1997 | Swift 007.i | Ford XD V8t | G | (Brazil) Roberto Moreno | 11 | | | 24 | 14 | 18 | 25 | 10 | 5 | | | | | | | | | | | | | | 19th | 16 |
| 1998 | | | | | | MIA | MOT | LBH | NAZ | RIO | GAT | MIL | DET | POR | CLE | TOR | MCH | MDO | ROA | VAN | LAG | HOU | SFR | FON | | | | |
| 1998 | Swift 009.c | Ford XD V8t | G | (United States) Michael Andretti | 6 | 1* | 14 | 21 | 18* | 5 | 2* | 26 | 10 | 17 | 2 | 2 | 6 | 21 | **15** | 2 | 10 | 28 | 20 | 18 | | | 8th | 108 |
| 1998 | Swift 009.c | Ford XD V8t | G | (Brazil) Christian Fittipaldi | 11 | 4 | 25 | 26 | 11 | 21 | 11 | DNS | 17 | 26 | 11 | 16 | 25 | 13 | 3 | 14 | 9 | 27 | 3 | 7 | | | 14th | 56 |
| 1998 | Swift 009.c | Ford XD V8t | G | (Brazil) Roberto Moreno | 11 | | | | | | | 24 | | | | | | | | | | | | | | | 31st | 0 |
| 1999 | | | | | | MIA | MOT | LBH | NAZ | RIO | GAT | MIL | POR | CLE | ROA | TOR | MCH | DET | MDO | CHI | VAN | LAG | HOU | SRF | FON | | | |
| 1999 | Swift 010.c | Ford XD V8t | F | (United States) Michael Andretti | 6 | 2 | 5 | 7 | 6 | 26 | 1* | 15 | 10 | 3 | **2** | 26 | 4 | 4 | 8 | 22 | 14 | 10 | 3 | 5 | 21 | | 4th | 151 |
| 1999 | Swift 010.c | Ford XD V8t | F | (Brazil) Christian Fittipaldi | 11 | 9 | 3 | 5 | 7 | **3** | 9 | 6 | 14 | 12 | 1 | 3 | 8 | | | | | | 7 | 25 | 3 | | 7th | 121 |
| 1999 | Swift 010.c | Ford XD V8t | F | (Brazil) Roberto Moreno | 11 | | | | | | | | | | | | | 14 | 16 | 9 | 15 | 2 | | | | | 14th | 58 |
| 2000 | | | | | | MIA | LBH | RIO | MOT | NAZ | MIL | DET | POR | CLE | TOR | MCH | CHI | MDO | ROA | VAN | LAG | GAT | HOU | SRF | FON | | | |
| 2000 | Lola B2K/00 | Ford XF V8t | F | (United States) Michael Andretti | 6 | 22 | 14 | 9 | 1 | 6 | 2 | 13 | 4 | 4 | 1 | 2 | 2 | 8 | 19 | 12 | 14 | 20* | 13 | 20 | 19 | | 8th | 127 |
| 2000 | Lola B2K/00 | Ford XF V8t | F | (Brazil) Christian Fittipaldi | 11 | 7 | 18 | 5 | 11 | 11 | 9 | 19 | 3 | 17 | 17 | 14 | DNS | 3 | 15 | 4 | 10 | 12 | 6 | 15 | 1 | | 12th | 96 |
| 2001 | | | | | | MTY | LBH | NAZ | TEX | MOT | MIL | DET | POR | CLE | TOR | MCH | CHI | MDO | ROA | VAN | LAU | ROC | HOU | LAG | SRF | FON | | |
| 2001 | Lola B01/00 | Toyota RV8F V8t | F | (Brazil) Cristiano da Matta | 6 | 1* | 2 | C^{1} | 10 | 25 | 25 | 7 | 10 | 7 | 15 | 4 | 19 | 10 | 6 | 20 | 26 | 3 | 6 | 20 | 1 | 1 | 5th | 140 |
| 2001 | Lola B01/00 | Toyota RV8F V8t | F | (Brazil) Christian Fittipaldi | 11 | 20 | 24 | C^{1} | 5 | 4 | 18 | 5 | 3 | 11 | 12 | 18 | 25 | 8 | 18 | 11 | 19 | 24 | 8 | 9 | 8 | 13 | 15th | 70 |
| 2002 | | | | | | MTY | LBH | MOT | MIL | LAG | POR | CHI | TOR | CLE | VAN | MDO | ROA | MTL | DEN | ROC | MIA | SFR | FON | MXC | | | | |
| 2002 | Lola B02/00 | Toyota RV8F V8t | B | (Brazil) Cristiano da Matta | 1 | | | | | | | | | | | | | | | | | **8*** | 11 | 2 | | | **1st** | 237 |
| 2002 | Lola B02/00 | Toyota RV8F V8t | B | (Brazil) Cristiano da Matta | 6 | 1* | 8 | 13 | 11 | **1*** | **1*** | 1* | **1*** | **16** | **12** | 13 | 1 | **2** | 3 | 2 | 1* | | | | | | **1st** | 237 |
| 2002 | Lola B02/00 | Toyota RV8F V8t | B | (Brazil) Christian Fittipaldi | 11 | 3 | 13 | 12 | 4 | 2 | 13 | 14 | 3 | 12 | 13 | 2 | 6 | 7 | 5 | 17 | 2 | 11 | 7 | 15 | | | 5th | 122 |
| 2003 | | | | | | STP | MTY | LBH | BRH | LAU | MIL | LAG | POR | CLE | TOR | VAN | ROA | MDO | MTL | DEN | MIA | MXC | SFR | | | | | |
| 2003 | Lola B02/00 | Ford XFE V8t | B | (Brazil) Bruno Junqueira | 1 | 3 | 5 | 3 | 2 | 4 | 17 | 2 | 4 | 3 | 3 | 2 | **1*** | 13 | 13 | **1*** | 9 | 7 | 15* | | | | **2nd** | 199 |
| 2003 | Lola B02/00 | Ford XFE V8t | B | (France) Sébastien Bourdais | 2 | **11** | **17** | 16 | 1* | **1*** | 9 | 17 | 14 | **1** | 4 | 3 | 2 | 5 | 19 | 2 | 17 | 2 | **17** | | | | 4th | 159 |
| 2004 | | | | | | LBH | MTY | MIL | POR | CLE | TOR | VAN | ROA | DEN | MTL | LAG | LSV | SFR | MXC | | | | | | | | | |
| 2004 | Lola B02/00 | Ford XFE V8t | B | (France) Sébastien Bourdais | 2 | 3 | **1*** | 18 | **1*** | 1* | **1*** | 5 | **3** | **1** | **15*** | **8** | 1* | 2 | **1*** | | | | | | | | **1st** | 369 |
| 2004 | Lola B02/00 | Ford XFE V8t | B | (Brazil) Bruno Junqueira | 6 | **2** | 2 | 6 | 2 | 2 | 18 | 4 | 15 | 3 | 1 | 2 | 2 | 1 | 2 | | | | | | | | **2nd** | 341 |
| 2005 | | | | | | LBH | MTY | MIL | POR | CLE | TOR | EDM | SJO | DEN | MTL | LSV | SRF | MXC | | | | | | | | | | |
| 2005 | Lola B02/00 | Ford XFE V8t | B | (France) Sébastien Bourdais | 1 | 1* | **5** | 6 | 2 | 5 | **5*** | 1 | **1*** | 1 | **4*** | **1** | 1* | 17 | | | | | | | | | **1st** | 348 |
| 2005 | Lola B02/00 | Ford XFE V8t | B | (Brazil) Bruno Junqueira | 2 | 3 | 1 | | | | | | | | | | | | | | | | | | | | 19th | 59 |
| 2005 | Lola B02/00 | Ford XFE V8t | B | (Spain) Oriol Servià | 2 | | | 3 | 16 | 3 | 2 | 2 | 3 | 4 | 1 | 2 | **5** | 4 | | | | | | | | | **2nd** | 288 |
| 2006 | | | | | | LBH | HOU | MTY | MIL | POR | CLE | TOR | EDM | SJO | DEN | MTL | ROA | SRF | MXC | | | | | | | | | |
| 2006 | Lola B02/00 | Ford XFE V8t | B | (France) Sébastien Bourdais | 1 | **1*** | 1 | **1*** | **1*** | 3 | 18 | 3 | **2*** | **1*** | **7** | **1*** | 3* | 8 | 1 | | | | | | | | **1st** | 387 |
| 2006 | Lola B02/00 | Ford XFE V8t | B | (Brazil) Bruno Junqueira | 2 | 15 | 10 | 10 | 15 | **4** | 2 | 8 | 15 | 17 | 2 | 12 | 2 | 6 | 4 | | | | | | | | 5th | 219 |
| 2007 | | | | | | LSV | LBH | HOU | POR | CLE | MTT | TOR | EDM | SJO | ROA | ZOL | ASN | SFR | MXC | | | | | | | | | |
| 2007 | Panoz DP01 | Cosworth XFE V8t | B | (France) Sébastien Bourdais | 1 | 13 | **1*** | 1* | 1 | **12** | 2* | **9** | 1* | 5 | **1*** | **1*** | **7** | 1* | 1* | | | | | | | | **1st** | 364 |
| 2007 | Panoz DP01 | Cosworth XFE V8t | B | (United States) Graham Rahal | 2 | 17 | 8 | 2 | 9 | 8 | 7 | 11 | 3 | 6 | 3 | 3 | 9 | 11 | 4 | | | | | | | | 5th | 243 |

^{1} The Firestone Firehawk 600 was canceled after qualifying due to excessive g-forces on the drivers.

=== Complete IndyCar Series results ===
(key)

| Year | Chassis | Engine | Tyres | Drivers | No. | 1 | 2 | 3 | 4 | 5 | 6 | 7 | 8 | 9 | 10 | 11 | 12 | 13 | 14 | 15 | 16 | 17 | 18 | 19 | Pts Pos | Pos |
|---|---|---|---|---|---|---|---|---|---|---|---|---|---|---|---|---|---|---|---|---|---|---|---|---|---|---|
| 2004 | | | | | | HMS | PHX | MOT | INDY | TXS | RIR | KAN | NSH | MIL | MCH | KTY | PPIR | NAZ | CHI | FON | TXS | | | | | |
| 2004 | G-Force GF09B | Honda HI4R V8 | F | (Brazil) Bruno Junqueira | 36 | | | | 5 | | | | | | | | | | | | | | | | 28th | 30 |
| 2005 | | | | | | HMS | PHX | STP | MOT | INDY | TXS | RIR | KAN | NSH | MIL | MCH | KTY | PPIR | SNM | CHI | WGL | FON | | | | |
| 2005 | Panoz GF09C | Honda HI5R V8 | F | (Brazil) Bruno Junqueira | 36 | | | | | 30 | | | | | | | | | | | | | | | 36th | 10 |
| 2005 | Panoz GF09C | Honda HI5R V8 | F | (France) Sébastien Bourdais | 37 | | | | | 12 | | | | | | | | | | | | | | | 28th | 18 |
| 2008 | | | | | | HMS | STP | MOT | LBH^{1} | KAN | INDY | MIL | TXS | IOW | RIR | WGL | NSH | MDO | EDM | KTY | SNM | DET | CHI | SRF^{2} | | |
| 2008 | Dallara IR-05 | Honda HI7R V8 | F | (United Kingdom) Justin Wilson | 02 | 15 | 9 | | | 9 | 27 | 7 | 27 | 12 | 7 | 25 | 18 | 11 | 3 | 24 | 9 | 1 | 11 | 12 | 11th | 340 |
| 2008 | Panoz DP01 | Cosworth XFE V8t | B | (United Kingdom) Justin Wilson | 02 | | | | **19** | | | | | | | | | | | | | | | | 11th | 340 |
| 2008 | Dallara IR-05 | Honda HI7R V8 | F | (United States) Graham Rahal | 06 | | 1* | | | 12 | 33 | 25 | 11 | 10 | 18 | 8 | 12 | 16 | 26 | 25 | 8 | 13 | 19 | 9 | 17th | 288 |
| 2008 | Panoz DP01 | Cosworth XFE V8t | B | (United States) Graham Rahal | 06 | | | | 13 | | | | | | | | | | | | | | | | 17th | 288 |
| 2009 | | | | | | STP | LBH | KAN | INDY | MIL | TXS | IOW | RIR | WGL | TOR | EDM | KTY | MDO | SNM | CHI | MOT | HMS | | | | |
| 2009 | Dallara IR-05 | Honda HI7R V8 | F | (United States) Graham Rahal | 02 | **7** | 12 | **7** | 31 | 4 | 22 | 11 | 3 | 13 | 20 | 7 | 5 | 8 | 21 | 5 | 3 | 11 | | | 7th | 385 |
| 2009 | Dallara IR-05 | Honda HI7R V8 | F | (Netherlands) Robert Doornbos | 06 | 11 | 9 | 12 | 28 | 14 | 11 | 15 | 9 | 9 | 23 | 9 | 19 | | | | | | | | 16th | 283 |
| 2009 | Dallara IR-05 | Honda HI7R V8 | F | (Spain) Oriol Servià | 06 | | | | | | | | | | | | | 11 | 6 | 7 | 4 | | | | 21st | 115 |
| 2009 | Dallara IR-05 | Honda HI7R V8 | F | (United Kingdom) Alex Lloyd | 40202 | | | | | | | | | | | | | | | | | 8 | | | 30th | 41 |
| 2010 | | | | | | SAO | STP | ALA | LBH | KAN | INDY | TXS | IOW | WGL | TOR | EDM | MDO | SNM | CHI | KTY | MOT | HMS | | | | |
| 2010 | Dallara IR-05 | Honda HI7R V8 | F | (United States) Graham Rahal | 02 | | | | | | | | | | 5 | | 20 | 9 | 10 | | 8 | 10 | | | 20th | 235 |
| 2010 | Dallara IR-05 | Honda HI7R V8 | F | (Japan) Hideki Mutoh | 06 | 20 | 14 | 15 | 13 | 23 | 28 | 12 | 20 | 12 | 12 | 17 | 18 | 17 | 13 | 17 | 14 | 20 | | | 18th | 250 |
| 2011 | | | | | | STP | ALA | LBH | SAO | INDY | TXS | | MIL | IOW | TOR | EDM | MDO | NHA | SNM | BAL | MOT | KTY | LSV | | | |
| 2011 | Dallara IR-05 | Honda HI7R V8 | F | (Spain) Oriol Servià | 2 | 9 | 5 | 6 | 5 | 6 | 21 | 15 | 3 | 14 | 12 | 22 | 8 | 2 | 11 | 2 | 5 | 6 | C^{3} | | 4th | 425 |
| 2011 | Dallara IR-05 | Honda HI7R V8 | F | (Canada) James Hinchcliffe | 06 | | 24 | 4 | 9 | 29 | 20 | 19 | 6 | 9 | 14 | 15 | 20 | 4 | 7 | 24 | 15 | 4 | C^{3} | | 12th | 302 |

1. Race run to Champ Car specifications.
2. Non-points-paying, exhibition race.
3. The final race at Las Vegas was canceled due to Dan Wheldon's death.

== See also ==
- Haas Lola
- Carl A. Haas Motorsports
- Newman/Haas IndyCar featuring Nigel Mansell (1994 video game)
- Newman/Haas Racing (video game) (1998 video game)
