= 2003 King Taco 500 =

The 2003 King Taco 500 was to have been the nineteenth and final race of the 2003 CART World Series season on November 9, 2003 at the California Speedway in Fontana, California. However, the event was canceled because of a series of large wildfires in the San Bernardino Mountains north of the speedway.

== Background ==
CART renewed the 500-mile oval race in 1997 at the newly built California Speedway in Fontana, California. The new track was built just 4 miles (6.4 km) from the previous Ontario Motor Speedway where the California 500 was held between 1970 and 1980.

The Fontana race served as the CART season finale. The race became known for closed-course record speeds, and fast and competitive racing, owing much to the track's width.

Questions over CART's future at California Speedway were first raised in June 2003 when the CART race was left out of the track's 2004 season ticket package. Tickets for any 2004 CART race, the final year of the track's contract with CART, would be sold individually. Speedway President Bill Miller said, "the landscape has changed. We need to see where that is beyond 2004... We're an important market for them. But it needs to make sense. They have a lot on the horizon. They need to determine the direction they're going. Are they going road racing? Are they going international? Are they committed to the superspeedway ovals? There have been comments made (by CART officials) that 'sometimes we don't know that it makes sense to run them on these superspeedways.'"

A major wildfire, which was dubbed the Old Fire, started on October 25, was just one of many in the Southern California region at the time. Because of concerns about the air quality, spectator and driver safety and worries that safety equipment and volunteers needed for the race would be occupied in fighting the fires, the race was initially postponed by the track on October 28, a decision CART executives disagreed with.

"Apparently, back in Indianapolis, they don't realize the impact the fires have had, fires that came within five miles of the track at one point, but after talking with the CART people most of the day, we made the decision to call it off this weekend," said Bill Miller, California Speedway president. "We struggled with the decision all day long and finally made it on our own. Our dialogue with the CART management team was very disappointing, but all we had to do was look up in the sky and see ashes falling down and the decision was made easy."

When attempts to find a date to reschedule the event failed, the race was officially cancelled by CART on October 29. CART officials looked into holding the race a week later, or at fellow International Speedway Corporation track, Phoenix Raceway, on Monday or Tuesday after the NASCAR Winston Cup race on November 9. Ticket holders were given four options: apply the credits towards 2004 tickets, donate the money to the Red Cross wildfire relief fund, trade the tickets for Winston Cup tickets at Phoenix, or get a refund. A scheduled NASCAR Winston West Series support race was also cancelled. Points leader Paul Tracy had already clinched the season championship following the previous race at Surfers Paradise.

When the 2004 CART schedule was released in early November, California Speedway was tentatively on the schedule. However, the speedway filed suit against CART seeking a refund of the $2.5 million sanctioning fee the track had paid the series, minus an agreed amount for expenses CART incurred for the cancelled race. The financially insolvent CART was sold at the end of 2003 and the re-organized Champ Car never returned to California Speedway.

Previous race: 2003 Lexmark Indy 300	Champ Car World Series; 2003 season	Next race: 2004 Toyota Grand Prix of Long Beach; Next Season (as Champ Car World Series)
Previous race: 2002 The 500	2003 King Taco 500	Next race: 2004 Toyota Indy 400; IndyCar Series event 2012 MAVTV 500; 500-mile race at Fontana
