= 2002 The 500 =

Motor race held in Fontana, California

(United States) 2002 The 500
Race details
Race 18 of 19 in the 2002 CART season
← Previous race	Next race →
- Layout of the California Speedway
- Date: November 3, 2002
- Official name: The 500 Presented by Toyota
- Location: California Speedway; Fontana, California, United States
- Course: Permanent racing facility 2.029 mi / 3.265 km
- Distance: 250 laps 507.250 mi / 816.250 km
- Weather: Mostly cloudy

Pole position
- Driver: (Brazil) Tony Kanaan (Mo Nunn Racing)
- Time: 31.483

Fastest lap
- Driver: (Spain) Oriol Servià (Patrick Racing)
- Time: 31.469 (on lap 234 of 250)

Podium
- First: (United States) Jimmy Vasser (Team Rahal)
- Second: (United States) Michael Andretti (Team Motorola)
- Third: (Canada) Patrick Carpentier (Forsythe Racing)

The 2002 The 500 Presented by Toyota was a Championship Auto Racing Teams (CART) open-wheel race that was held on November 3, 2002, at California Speedway in Fontana, California before 50,000 spectators. Contested over 250 laps, it was the 18th and penultimate round of the 2002 CART FedEx Championship Series and the sixth running of the event. Team Rahal driver Jimmy Vasser won the race from the sixth position. Michael Andretti, driving for Team Motorola, finished second, and Patrick Carpentier finished third for Forsythe Racing.

Tony Kanaan won his fourth career pole position by posting the fastest lap of qualifications. The early portions of the race were dominated by Andretti and Team Green teammate Paul Tracy, though the latter driver eventually fell out with engine issues. Vasser overtook Kanaan for the lead following a cycle of pit stops on lap 76 and dominated a majority of the race, only conceding the lead to Michel Jourdain Jr. and Dario Franchitti during pit stop sequences. With each cycle of stops, series champion Cristiano da Matta inched closer to Vasser until he finally assumed the lead on lap 203. After Vasser's team made a slight mistake during his final pit stop, da Matta seemed poised to take the win until his engine expired on lap 236. Andretti overtook Vasser for the lead on the ensuing restart, but after Franchitti suffered an engine failure, CART officials issued the red flag to ensure a green-flag finish. Vasser took the lead from Andretti shortly after the last restart to earn his 10th and final career victory and second at California Speedway.

The result moved Carpentier up to third in the Drivers' Championship standings, three points behind second-place Bruno Junqueira. Constructors' Cup champion Lola continued lengthening their lead over Reynard, as did Manufacturers' Cup titlist Toyota over Honda with one race left in the season. The race had an average speed of 197.995 mph (318.642 km/h), which was the fastest for a 500-mile American open-wheel car race until 2014. The race wound up being CART's last at California Speedway as the 2003 running of the event was cancelled because of the Old Fire.

== Background ==
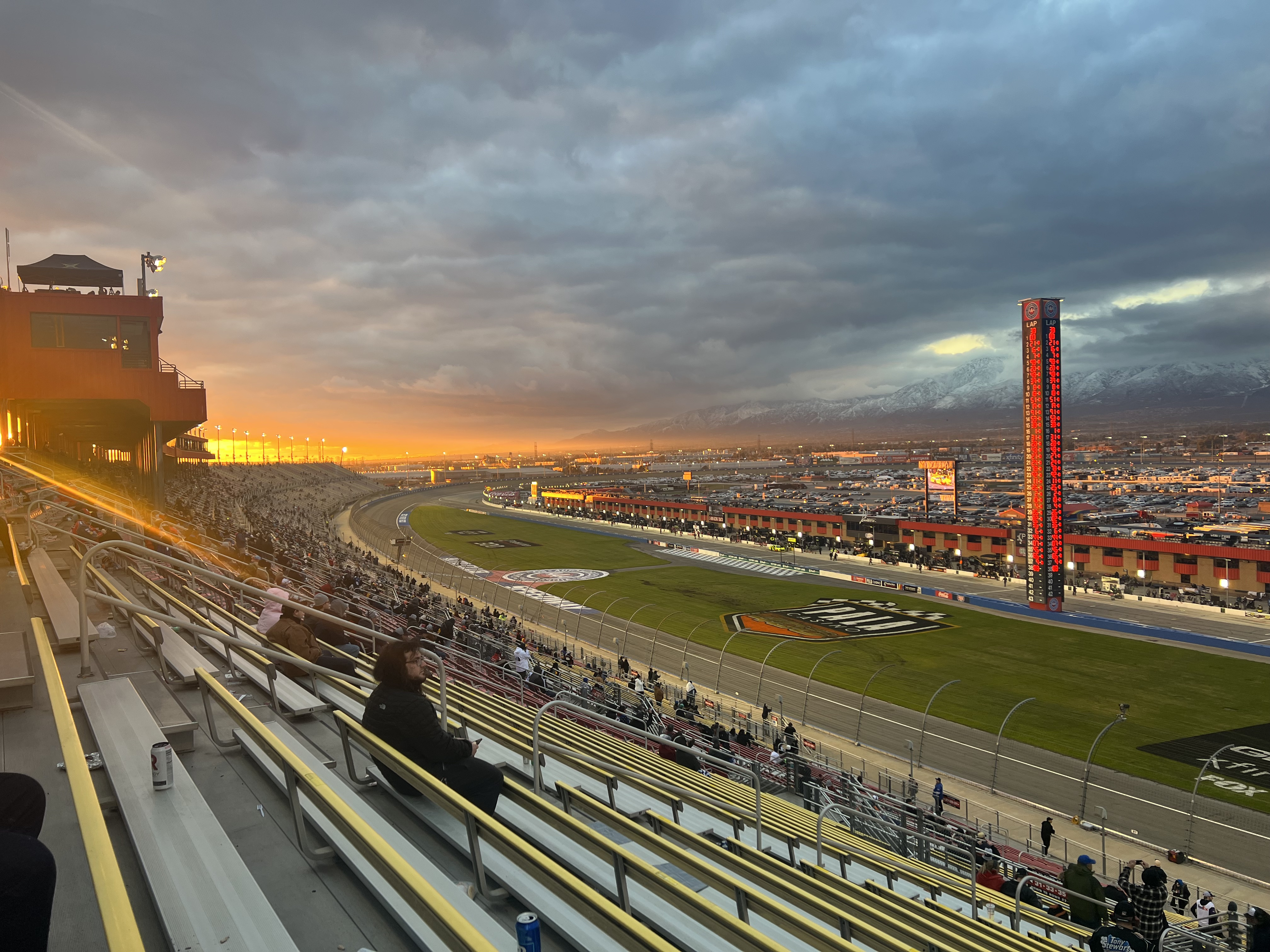
California Speedway (pictured in 2023), where the race was held.

The 500 was confirmed to be included on Championship Auto Racing Teams (CART)'s 2002 schedule in November 2001. It was the 18th of 19 races scheduled by CART, the sixth annual edition of the event, and was held on November 3, 2002 at the California Speedway, a 2.029 mi (3.265 km) four-turn oval circuit, in Fontana, California, United States. It was to be contested for 250 laps over a distance of 507.250 miles (816.340 km). Each team was allotted 250 U.S. gal (950 L) of fuel and allowed to start the race with up to 35 U.S. gal (130 L); in addition, drivers were mandated to enter pit road at a 33-lap interval.

Heading into the race, Newman/Haas Racing driver Cristiano da Matta, the defending champion of The 500, garnered 219 points and led the Drivers' Championship, which he had already clinched following his victory in the Grand Prix Americas on October 6. Bruno Junqueira held second with 144 points, and Dario Franchitti was third with 135 points. Patrick Carpentier and Christian Fittipaldi occupied the fourth and fifth positions with 131 and 116 points, respectively. In the Constructors' Cup standings, Lola, which had secured the championship with Junqueira's win in the Grand Prix of Denver, held first with 357 points, 148 more than Reynard. As for the Manufacturers' Cup, Toyota accumulated 301 points and obtained the championship on account of Kenny Bräck's fourth-place finish at Surfers Paradise. They were followed by Honda (255 points) and Ford-Cosworth (226 points).

The Handford device was trimmed three inches by CART, allowing an influx of speed and a significant reduction of aerodynamic drag in the race. Jimmy Vasser, who won the 1998 edition of the event and finished ninth in the Indy Racing League race at the circuit earlier that year, predicted that The 500 would be "a wild one" due to the Handford device's new configuration. After a disappointing finish in the preceding Honda Indy 300, da Matta felt confident in his ability to win at California for the second consecutive year. Da Matta's teammate Fittipaldi spoke on the many physical and mental adversities that drivers have to face for The 500. Paul Tracy expressed enthusiasm for the forthcoming event after testing a Honda engine at the track several weeks prior. Michael Andretti reflected on his team's recent misfortunes, including a controversial loss at Surfers Paradise, and hoped to have a "perfectly trouble-free weekend" at California.

Between the eighteen entries for the race, the lone driver change was of the No. 51 Fernández Racing entry. Adrián Fernández, who normally drove the car, suffered two thoracic fractures in a major opening-lap pileup at Surfers Paradise and was prohibited from competing at California. In the meantime, Max Papis was chosen to substitute for the injured Fernández. Tora Takagi also endured minor pelvic fractures in the accident, but he was allowed to race at California so long as he felt comfortable enough to do so.

== Practice and qualifying ==
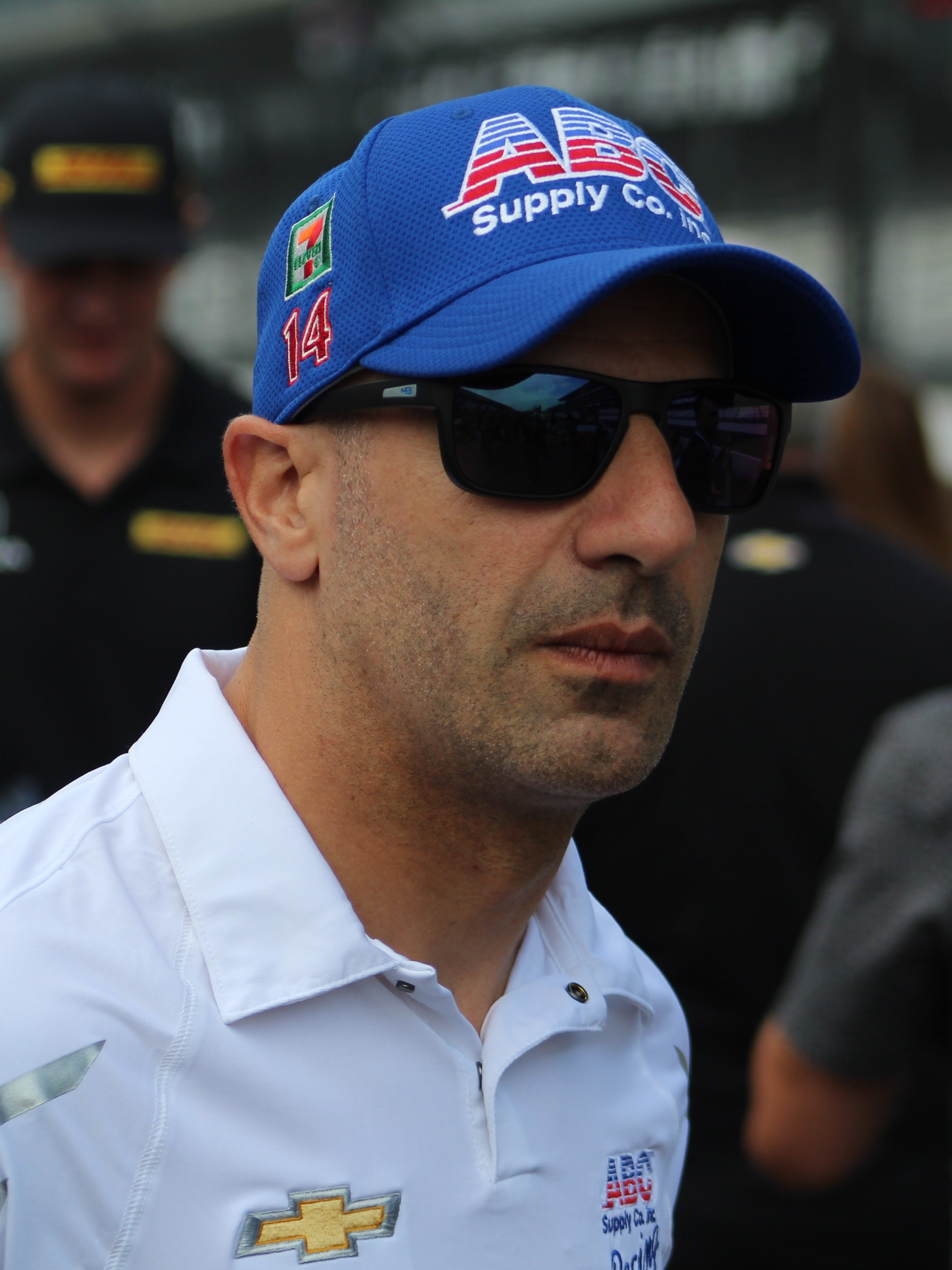
Tony Kanaan (pictured in 2018) won his fourth career pole position.

Three practice sessions were held prior to the race on Sunday—two on Friday and one on Saturday. The first session lasted 90 minutes, the second 75 minutes, and the third 60 minutes. In the first practice session on Friday morning, Tony Kanaan was fastest with a timed lap of 31.364 seconds, besting Franchitti, Carpentier, Alex Tagliani, and Andretti. Later that afternoon, Tagliani paced the second practice session with a time of 31.252 seconds, followed by Vasser, Michel Jourdain Jr., Kanaan, and Franchitti. Kanaan improved on his quickest time during the final practice session on Saturday morning, with a lap of 31.006 seconds; he outpaced Franchitti, Tagliani, Carpentier, and Jourdain Jr. Kenny Bräck, fifteenth-quickest in the session, spun without contact while exiting the second turn.

During qualifying, which was held on Saturday afternoon and lasted 120 minutes, drivers were allowed to complete up to five warm-up laps prior to their two timed laps, the fastest of which would determine their starting position. Kanaan earned the fourth pole position of his CART career with a quickest time of 31.483 seconds. He was joined on the grid's front row by Junqueira, who was 0.118 seconds slower and held the pole position until Kanaan's lap. Da Matta qualified third, Andretti fourth, and Tracy fifth. Vasser, Tagliani, Carpentier, Franchitti, and Papis took positions sixth through tenth, and Jourdain Jr., Shinji Nakano, Fittipaldi, Scott Dixon, Bräck, Takagi, Mario Domínguez, and Oriol Servià completed the starting grid. After the qualifier, Kanaan jokingly ribbed on Junqueira and believed that the race would produce many passes and lead changes.

=== Qualifying classification ===
Final qualifying results
Pos	No.	Driver	Team	Time	Speed	Grid
1	10	(Brazil) Tony Kanaan	Mo Nunn Racing	31.483	232.011	1
2	4	(Brazil) Bruno Junqueira	Chip Ganassi Racing	31.601	231.145	2
3	1	(Brazil) Cristiano da Matta	Newman/Haas Racing	31.679	230.575	3
4	39	(United States) Michael Andretti	Team Motorola	31.685	230.532	4
5	26	(Canada) Paul Tracy	Team Green	31.734	230.176	5
6	8	(United States) Jimmy Vasser	Team Rahal	31.736	230.161	6
7	33	(Canada) Alex Tagliani	Forsythe Racing	31.737	230.154	7
8	32	(Canada) Patrick Carpentier	Forsythe Racing	31.740	230.132	8
9	27	(United Kingdom) Dario Franchitti	Team Green	31.759	229.995	9
10	51	(Italy) Max Papis	Fernández Racing	31.798	229.713	10
11	9	(Mexico) Michel Jourdain Jr.	Team Rahal	31.804	229.669	11
12	52	(Japan) Shinji Nakano	Fernández Racing	31.836	229.438	12
13	11	(Brazil) Christian Fittipaldi	Newman/Haas Racing	31.877	229.143	13
14	44	(New Zealand) Scott Dixon	Chip Ganassi Racing	31.923	228.813	14
15	12	(Sweden) Kenny Bräck	Chip Ganassi Racing	31.981	228.398	15
16	5	(Japan) Toranosuke Takagi	Walker Racing	32.050	227.906	16
17	55	(Mexico) Mario Domínguez	Herdez Competition	32.087	227.644	17
18	20	(Spain) Oriol Servià	Patrick Racing	32.277	226.304	18

== Warm-up ==
All eighteen drivers took to the track on Sunday morning for a thirty-minute warm-up session under sunny weather. Kanaan showed even more speed during the session, setting the fastest time at 32.180 seconds. His lap was 0.041 seconds quicker than Jourdain Jr.'s fastest time; Takagi, Franchitti, and Tracy completed the top five.

== Race ==
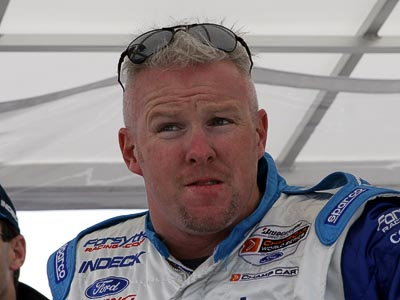
Paul Tracy (pictured in 2006) led 15 laps, but suffered an engine failure early in the race.

Live television coverage of the event aired on the Speed Channel and began at 12:30 p.m. Pacific Standard Time (UTC−08:00). Play-by-play commentary was provided by Bob Varsha, while Scott Pruett and Tommy Kendall took the roles of race analysts. Ambient air temperatures towards the start of the race were recorded at 77 °F (25 °C) with partly sunny skies. Approximately 50,000 people attended the event. The green flag was waved at 12:38 p.m. to signify the beginning of the race, and Andretti immediately fired past Kanaan on the outside line to take the lead. As Andretti quickly amassed a two-second lead, Kanaan lost second place to Tracy on the second lap, but regained the position four laps later. By utilizing the slipstream from the rear of Andretti's car, Kanaan got by Andretti for the lead in the first turn on lap 9. Andretti remained in hot pursuit of Kanaan and eventually overtook him again on lap 12, while Vasser simultaneously passed Tracy for third place; Vasser was eventually relegated to fifth place, behind Tracy and Carpentier, by the 15th lap. In the next two laps, Tracy made his way up from third to first, passing Andretti for the lead while entering turn one on lap 17. Andretti reclaimed the lead two laps later, but was quickly passed by Tracy again on the 20th lap. Vasser moved into the lead for the first time three laps later, and gained a 1.6-second lead ahead of Tracy and Andretti by lap 32 as both drivers engaged in a wheel-to-wheel duel for second place.

Vasser led all the drivers into pit road for the first round of green-flag pit stops on the 33rd lap; Andretti was credited with leading the lap, though Vasser regained the lead while exiting pit road. The first caution flag of the race was issued on lap 34 after a lug nut in Junqueira's left-rear tire loosened as he drove off of pit road, causing his tire to fall off. Junqueira later rejoined the race, albeit several laps down. The caution period allowed Franchitti to pit again. On the lap-39 restart, Andretti charged by Vasser to take the lead once again. Vasser then fell to third place a lap later as Tracy overtook him in the first corner. With each passing lap, Andretti, Tracy, Vasser, and Kanaan remained close together in the top four positions, as Papis challenged Carpentier for seventh place. Tracy slowly inched closer to Andretti before finally pulling to his outside at the fourth turn of lap 44, though he was unable to complete the pass for the lead. On the 46th lap, Tracy finally reclaimed the lead as Andretti fended off Vasser. Andretti got by Tracy two laps later, and from laps 48–64, Tracy and Andretti exchanged the lead nine times. Kanaan gradually climbed up the running order in the meantime and passed Tracy to retake the lead on the 65th lap.

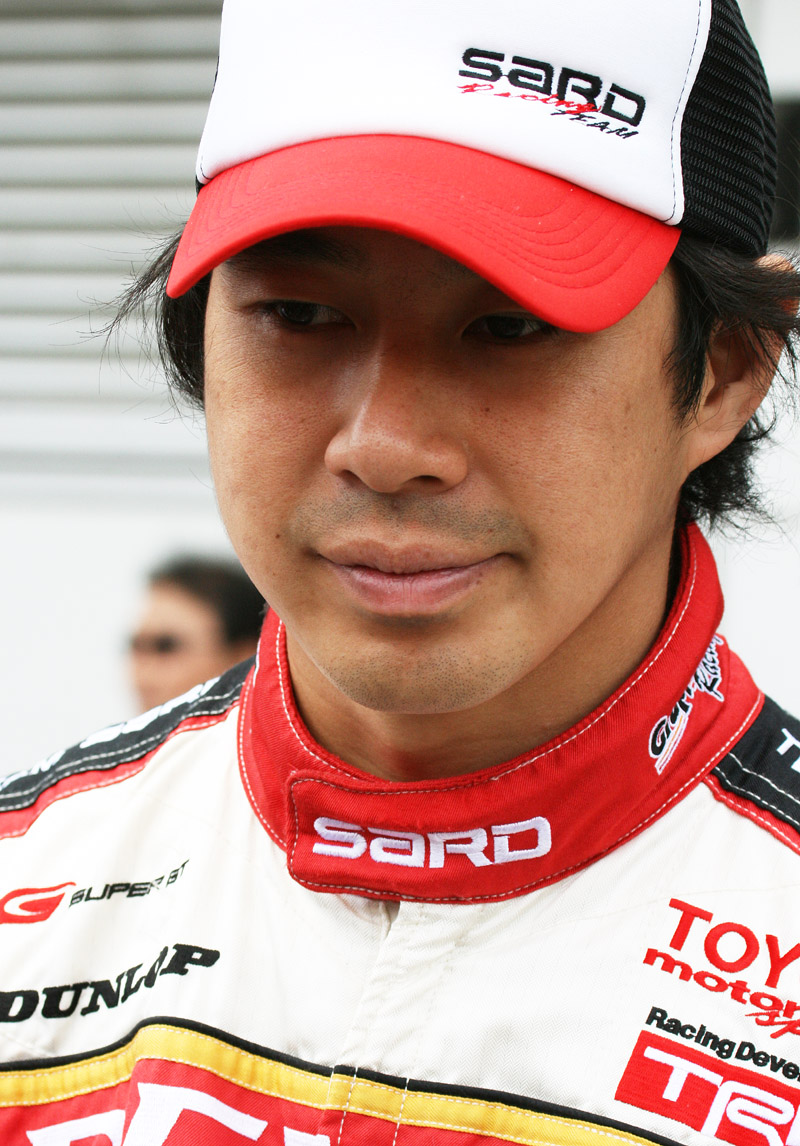
Toranosuke Takagi (pictured in 2008) crashed on lap 91.

The second cycle of pit stops commenced on lap 66, with Franchitti staying out on the track and assuming the first position. Franchitti eventually made his stop five laps later and handed the lead back to Kanaan. On lap 76, Vasser got by Kanaan to take the race lead. Fittipaldi overtook Newman/Haas Racing teammate da Matta for fifth place on the 80th lap, only for da Matta to reclaim the position four laps later. Meanwhile, Tracy was a lap behind race leader Vasser when he drove into pit road on lap 85 in order for his crew to alleviate an electrical issue; he rejoined the race on lap 89, four laps in arrears. On the 91st lap, Takagi overapplied the brakes while entering pit road and impacted the pit wall with the right side of his car, effectively ending his race. No caution flag was issued for the incident. Tracy, enduring more issues with his engine, came into pit road a lap later and became the race's second retiree. During the third round of pit stops on lap 99, Jourdain Jr. spun as he drove off of pit road on cold tires, while Tagliani lost control of his car and nearly made contact with the inside wall, necessitating the third caution.

Although Kanaan led the 99th lap, Vasser exited pit road first and led the field back up to speed for the restart on lap 105. Andretti quickly moved into second place by lap 108, passing Kanaan and da Matta, while Domínguez pulled off the track after suffering an engine failure. Da Matta battled for the second position with Andretti until he finally pulled ahead on the 124th lap, by which point Vasser gained a 0.7-second advantage over him. Two laps later, Kanaan passed Carpentier for fourth, and by lap 130, Vasser's lead over da Matta shrunk to less than four tenths of a second. Vasser led a majority of the leaders into pit road for the fourth round of stops on lap 132. As Jourdain Jr. stayed on the track for an additional three laps, da Matta exited pit road ahead of Vasser, only for Vasser to overtake da Matta for second place. Franchitti again assumed the lead until he made his stop on the 138th lap, conceding the lead back to Vasser.

By lap 158, Vasser opened up a 1.2-second lead ahead of da Matta when he was forced to drive on the apron of the front stretch while maneuvering around Nakano, who was three laps behind Vasser at this point. Vasser continued lengthening his gap over da Matta before he and most other drivers made their fifth scheduled pit stops of the race. Once again, Jourdain Jr. and Franchitti each led three laps before making their stops, and Vasser reclaimed the lead on the 171st lap. Vasser's advantage over da Matta was trimmed from 1.2 seconds to 0.4 seconds as he drove alongside 11th-placed Franchitti on lap 179. Carpentier moved into the third position ahead of Andretti four laps later. Andretti retook third place from Carpentier on the 189th lap, and on lap 194, he passed da Matta to move into second place. Andretti began reeling in Vasser before green-flag pit stops began for the sixth time on the 198th lap. Da Matta was again ahead of Vasser when they rejoined the track, though unlike the previous sequence of stops, da Matta continued to maintain the lead after Jourdain Jr. and Franchitti pitted by lap 203.

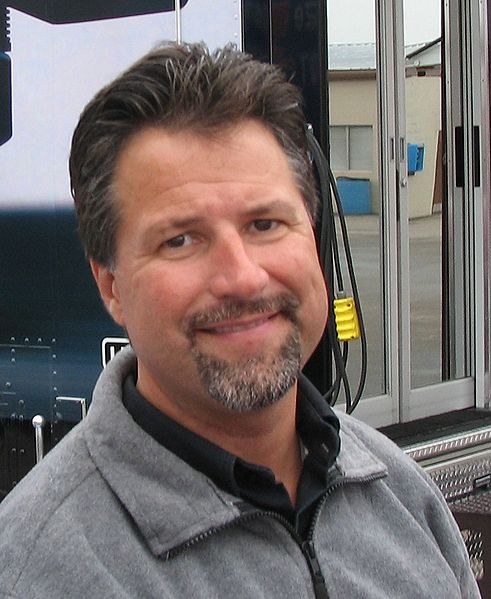
Michael Andretti (pictured in 2007) finished second after Jimmy Vasser passed him on lap 248.

Despite da Matta's 1.1-second lead, Vasser quickly gained a draft behind da Matta and narrowed his gap until lap 214, when he steered to da Matta's left-hand side in turn three to retake the first position. On lap 218, Carpentier and Andretti drove alongside each other in a duel for fourth place, and Jourdain Jr. fell out of the race from the third position a lap later after his engine dramatically poured smoke. Meanwhile, da Matta stayed close behind Vasser and attempted to pass him on the outside line on lap 222, to no avail. A lap later, da Matta successfully pulled ahead of Vasser to take the lead in the third corner, though Vasser drove up the track to engage a slingshot pass for the lead on the 224th lap. Vasser only gained a 0.1-second advantage before da Matta swerved to Vasser's right side to reclaim the lead on lap 230. On lap 232, the leaders made pit stops for the seventh time, with Franchitti assuming the lead yet again. Vasser's pit stop was slightly elongated as one of his crew members struggled to secure a tire, enabling da Matta to pull ahead of Vasser while driving off of pit road. Da Matta was in position to take the lead as Franchitti made his stop when his engine suddenly expired on the 236th lap, giving the lead back to Vasser. Because da Matta's car had been parked in an unsafe part of the track, the third caution was triggered two laps later.

Green-flag racing resumed on lap 242, with Vasser leading ahead of Andretti and Carpentier. Andretti immediately charged by Vasser in the first turn to take the lead. He amassed a 0.3-second advantage before Franchitti's car caught ablaze and came to a stop at the front stretch on the 245th lap, bringing out the fourth (and final) caution. The red flag was issued shortly thereafter to increase the chances of a green-flag finish. After two laps were completed under caution, the race was restarted on lap 248, and Vasser quickly used Andretti's draft to overtake him in the first corner. Vasser held onto the lead for the remaining two laps to earn his 10th career CART win and his first since the 2000 Texaco Grand Prix of Houston. In addition, he became the first driver to win The 500 twice. Andretti finished 0.400 seconds behind Vasser in second, with Carpentier taking third, Kanaan fourth, and Servià fifth. The final classified finishers were Dixon, Fittipaldi, Tagliani, and Junqueira. There were four cautions and 44 lead changes among seven drivers during the course of the race. With an average speed of 197.995 mph (318.642 km/h), it was the fastest 500-mile race in American open-wheel car racing history. (Note: The record was previously held by the 1990 Marlboro 500 at Michigan International Speedway, which had an average speed of 189.727 mph (305.336 km/h). It was later broken by the 2014 Pocono IndyCar 500 at Pocono Raceway with an average speed of 202.402 mph (325.734 km/h).)

=== Post-race ===
The top-three drivers appeared on the podium to collect their trophies and spoke to the media in a press conference. Vasser, who earned $100,000 from his victory, was happy to have earned his first win of the season: "First of all, it's a great win for me and the Shell team. You don't want to go the entire season without a win. All the credit goes to the guys on the team. They busted their butts to get the car put back together after Australia." He also praised Andretti for his driving prowess, saying: "Had it not been for Dario (Franchitti) causing the red flag, it would have been difficult to catch Michael (Andretti) under race conditions. Michael drove a great race. He expertly knew how to take away my air and just drove a great race." Second-place finisher Andretti described how the racing style changed from previous years: "This year was different than past years. You couldn't slingshot past the other cars because you'd lose grip on the front end when you got behind someone. After the restart the guy leading definitely has the advantage. Running 500 miles is mentally draining, I'm really tired mentally, but I have to say that everyone drove a good clean race which is nice to see.” Carpentier, who finished third, revealed that he experienced major oversteer during the final restart, but was nonetheless pleased with the result.

The race was received well by drivers and the media. Veteran journalist Robin Miller felt that CART's decision to stop the race after Franchitti's incident gave them "some much-needed credibility with its fans and teams" in the wake of the controversial Honda Indy 300, which ended with "total anger and confusion." Vasser also agreed with CART's decision, stating: "I thought it was the right call. We’ve seen it happen with NASCAR. It’s about the fans, giving them a proper green-flag finish. I thought it was the right thing.” Andretti admitted he wasn't pleased with the stoppage but resigned to the result: "Well, it's the new rule. If it's in the rule book, it's not supposed to end on a yellow, then that's the right thing. [...] Rules are rules, that's the way it works out. I can accept it." The aero package of the Handford device also proved popular with the drivers, with da Matta saying: "Usually I hate this race but today I had fun and this was a proper oval race because whoever was fastest was going to win." Andretti and Vasser praised the aero package for preventing drivers from bunching up with each other, and Carpentier noted the abundance of overtakes throughout the race.

With one race remaining in the season, da Matta earned 221 points in the Drivers' Championship, 73 more than Junqueira in second. Carpentier's third-place finish moved him into third in the standings on 145 points, while Franchitti fell to fourth with 138 and Fittipaldi remained fifth with 122. For the Constructors' Cup, Lola amassed 379 points as Reynard trailed on 223 points. Toyota gained 312 points for the Manufacturers' Cup; Honda was second with 271 and Ford-Cosworth stayed third on 247. This ended up being CART's last race at California Speedway as their 2003 event was cancelled due to the nearby Old Fire. Excluding the Indianapolis 500, this was also the final 500-mile race in American open-wheel car racing until the 2012 MAVTV 500 IndyCar World Championships, which was also held at California Speedway.

=== Race classification ===
Drivers who scored championship points are denoted in bold.

Final race results
Pos	No.	Driver	Team	Laps	Time/Retired	Grid	Points
1	8	(United States) **Jimmy Vasser**	**Team Rahal**	250	2:33:42.977	6	**21**^{1}
2	39	(United States) **Michael Andretti**	**Team Motorola**	250	+0.400	4	**16**
3	32	(Canada) **Patrick Carpentier**	**Forsythe Racing**	250	+1.794	8	**14**
4	10	(Brazil) **Tony Kanaan**	**Mo Nunn Racing**	250	+2.502	1	**13**^{2}
5	20	(Spain) **Oriol Servià**	**Patrick Racing**	249	+1 lap	18	**10**
6	44	(New Zealand) **Scott Dixon**	**Chip Ganassi Racing**	249	+1 lap	14	**8**
7	11	(Brazil) **Christian Fittipaldi**	**Newman/Haas Racing**	249	+1 lap	13	**6**
8	33	(Canada) **Alex Tagliani**	**Forsythe Racing**	248	+2 laps	7	**5**
9	4	(Brazil) **Bruno Junqueira**	**Chip Ganassi Racing**	247	+3 laps	2	**4**
10	27	(United Kingdom) **Dario Franchitti**	**Team Green**	242	Engine	9	**3**
11	1	(Brazil) **Cristiano da Matta**	**Newman/Haas Racing**	236	Engine	3	**2**
12	12	(Sweden) **Kenny Bräck**	**Chip Ganassi Racing**	235	Drive shaft	15	**1**
13	9	(Mexico) Michel Jourdain Jr.	Team Rahal	218	Engine	11	
14	51	(Italy) Max Papis	Fernández Racing	214	Engine	10	
15	52	(Japan) Shinji Nakano	Fernández Racing	202	Upright	12	
16	55	(Mexico) Mario Domínguez	Herdez Competition	107	Engine	17	
17	26	(Canada) Paul Tracy	Team Green	86	Throttle	5	
18	5	(Japan) Toranosuke Takagi	Walker Racing	85	Contact	16	

Notes

- **^1** – Includes one bonus point for leading the most laps.
- **^2** – Includes one bonus point for being the fastest qualifier.

== Standings after the race ==
Drivers' Championship standings
+/–	Pos.	Driver	Points
	1	(Brazil) **Cristiano da Matta**	221
	2	(Brazil) Bruno Junqueira	148 (–73)
**1**	3	(Canada) Patrick Carpentier	145 (–76)
**1**	4	(United Kingdom) Dario Franchitti	138 (–83)
	5	(Brazil) Christian Fittipaldi	122 (–99)

Constructors' Cup standings
+/–	Pos.	Constructor	Points
	1	(United Kingdom) **Lola**	379
	2	(United Kingdom) Reynard	223 (–156)

Manufacturers' Cup standings
+/–	Pos.	Manufacturer	Points
	1	(Japan) **Toyota**	312
	2	(Japan) Honda	271 (–41)
	3	(United Kingdom) Ford-Cosworth	247 (–65)

- Note: Only the top five positions are included for the Drivers' Championship standings.
- **Bold text** indicates the national champions.

== Notes and references ==
=== References ===
Previous race: 2002 Honda Indy 300	CART FedEx Championship Series; 2002 season	Next race: 2002 Gran Premio Telmex-Gigante
Previous race: 2001 Marlboro 500	The 500	Next race: 2003 King Taco 500
