= March 90P =

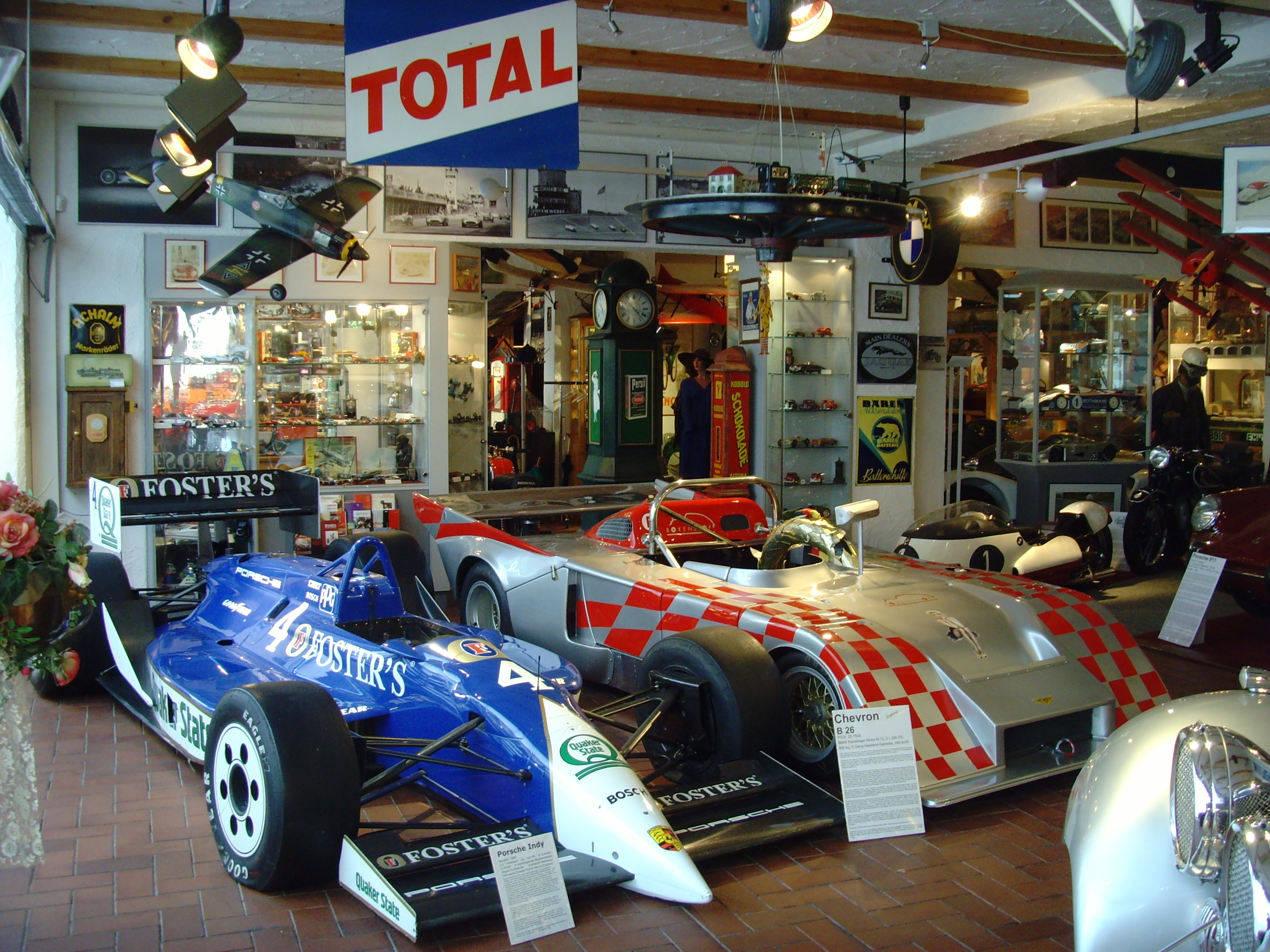
1990 March-Porsche 90P IndyCar on display in Tübingen, Germany, in 2008.

The March 90P is a bespoke open-wheel race car chassis, designed and built by March Engineering, to compete in the 1990 IndyCar season. The 90P chassis was unsuccessful, only managing to clinch one pole position, with Teo Fabi in Denver. It was powered by the Porsche Indy V8 engine.
