= Lola T90/00 =

Racing car designed and built by Lola Cars

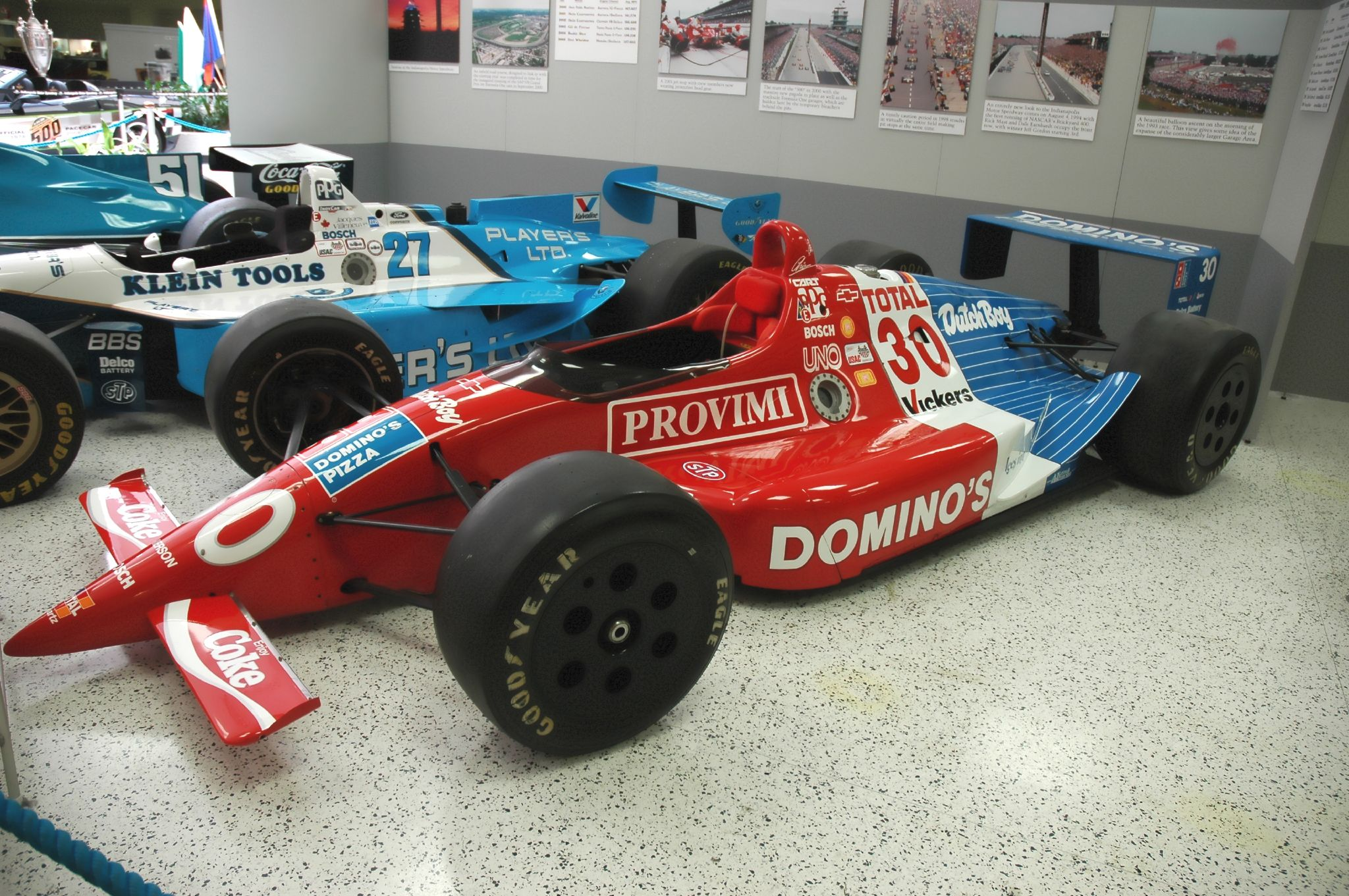
- Category: CART IndyCar
- Constructor: Lola
- Predecessor: Lola T89/00
- Successor: Lola T91/00

Technical specifications
- Length: 4,978 mm (196 in)
- Width: 2,032 mm (80 in)
- Height: 940 mm (37 in)
- Axle track: 1,753 mm (69 in) (Front); 1,638 mm (64 in) (Rear)
- Wheelbase: 3,048 mm (120 in)
- Engine: Chevrolet 2.65 L (2,650 cc; 162 cu in) V8 mid-engined
- Transmission: 6-speed manual
- Weight: 1,550 lb (700 kg)
- Fuel: Methanol
- Tyres: Goodyear

Competition history
- Debut: 1990 Autoworks 200

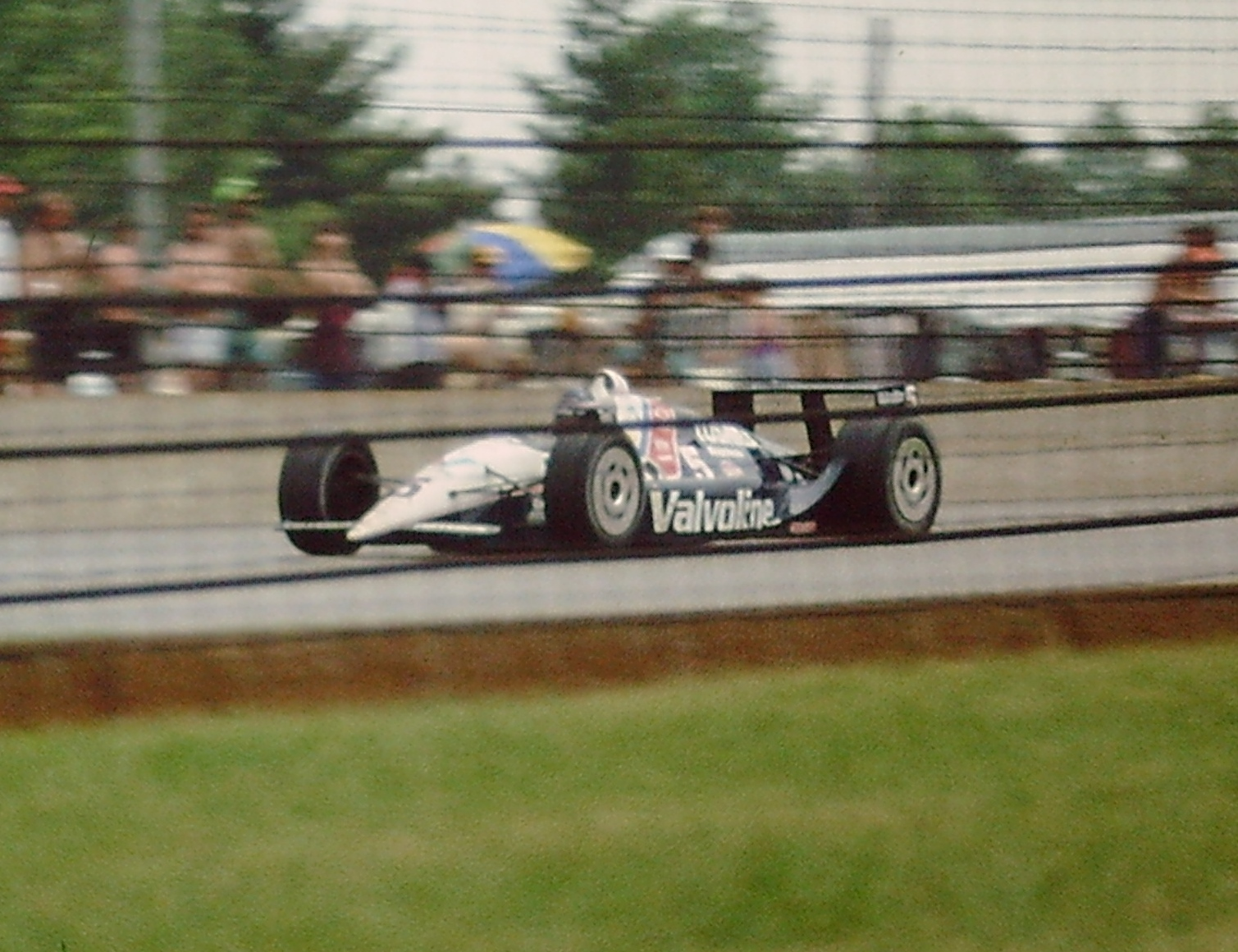
Al Unser Jr. in his Lola T90/00 IndyCar chassis at the 1990 Indianapolis 500

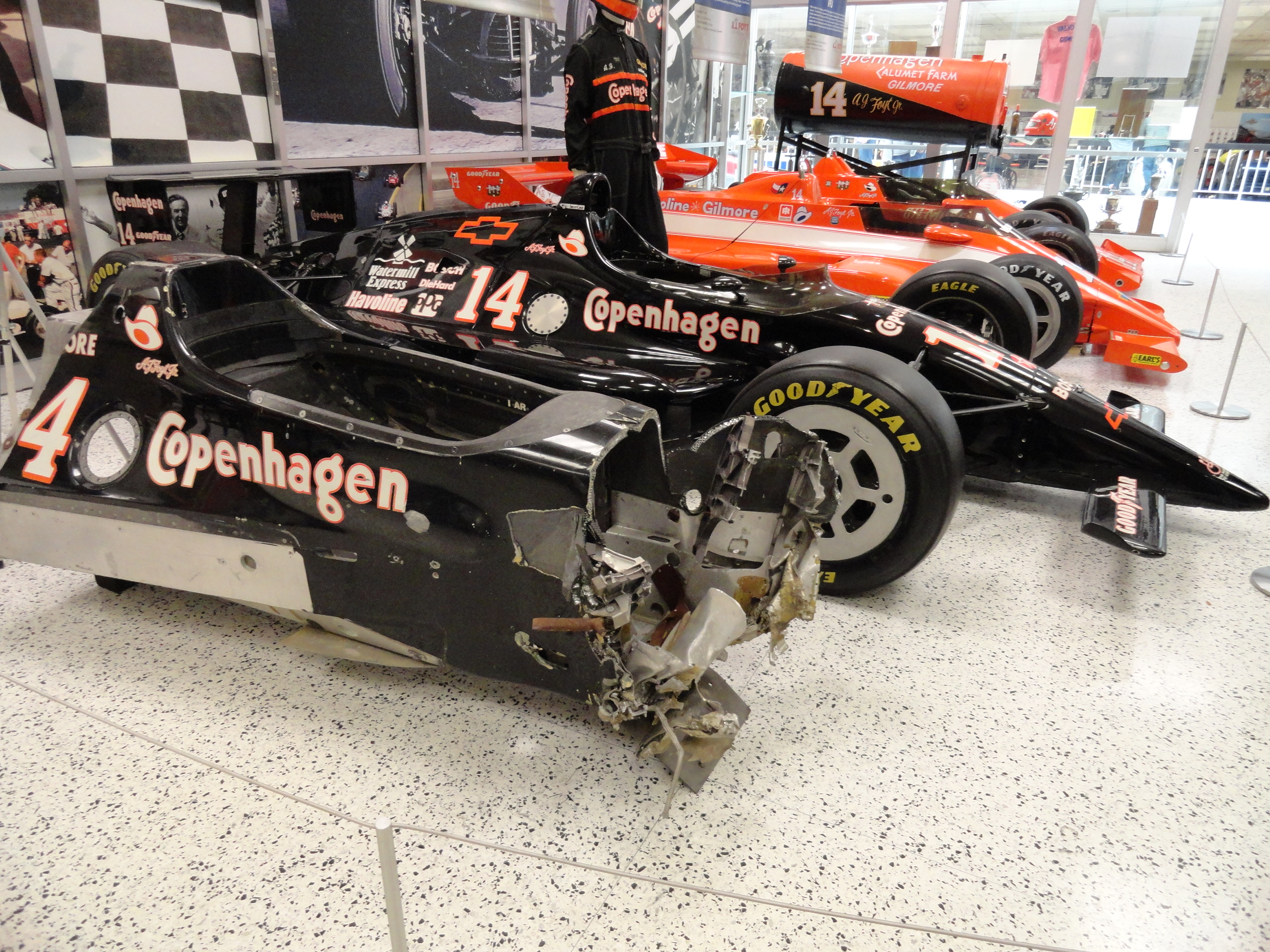
The Lola-Chevrolet that A. J. Foyt crashed in 1990

The Lola T90/00 is a highly successful open-wheel racing car chassis, designed and built by Lola Cars that competed in the CART open-wheel racing series, for competition in the 1990 season. It was extremely competitive, winning a total of 12 races that season, including a win for Dutchman Arie Luyendyk at the prestigious Indianapolis 500. It also gave American Al Unser Jr. his first of two IndyCar World Championships, with Galles-Kraco Racing. It was powered by the 735–800 hp (548–597 kW) Ilmor-Chevrolet 265-A turbo engine.

== See also ==
Media related to Lola T90/00 at Wikimedia Commons
